= 2012–13 Southern Football League =

The 2012–13 season was the 110th in the history of the Southern League, which is an English football competition featuring semi-professional and amateur clubs from the South West, South Central and Midlands of England and South Wales. From the previous season onwards, the Southern League was known as The Evo-Stik League Southern, following a sponsorship deal with Evo-Stik.

Due to step three leagues increasing their number of clubs from 22 to 24 from the 2013–14 season onwards, only two clubs were relegated from the Premier Division, and only one club was relegated from each of Division One Central and South & West this season.

== Premier Division ==
The Premier Division consisted of 22 clubs, including 17 clubs from the previous season and seven new clubs:

- Two clubs promoted from Division One Central:
  - Bedworth United
  - St Neots Town
- Two clubs promoted from Division One South & West:
  - Bideford
  - Gosport Borough
- Plus:
  - Kettering Town, demoted from the Conference National for financial reasons

Hinckley United and Maidenhead United were originally relegated to this division from the Conference North/South, but were reprieved after the liquidation of Darlington and the resignation of Kettering Town from the Conference National. Darlington were relegated to the Northern League, and Kettering applied to join the Southern League, allowing for a further reprieve for Hemel Hempstead Town.

Leamington won the division and were promoted to the Conference North, while play-off winners Gosport Borough were promoted to the Conference South. Hemel Hempstead Town reached the play-off final after two relegation reprieves in the previous three seasons. Only two clubs were relegated this season due to the expansion of the Premier Division to 24 clubs for the next season. Bedworth United were relegated straight back to step 4, while Kettering Town continued their fall to Division One Central.

=== League table ===
Southern Football League Premier Division
- Season: 2012–13
- Champions: Leamington
- Promoted: Leamington; Gosport Borough
- Relegated: Bedworth United; Kettering Town
- Matches: 462
- Goals: 1,409 (3.05 per match)
- Top goalscorer: John Frendo (Hitchin Town) - 31
- Biggest home win: Gosport Borough 7–0 Kettering Town, 15 December 2012; Stourbridge 8–1 Banbury United, 18 September 2012
- Biggest away win: Kettering Town 0–7 Bashley, 6 October 2012
- Highest scoring: Hemel Hempstead Town 8–2 Hitchin Town, 15 December 2012
- Highest attendance: 1027 (Leamington 2–1 St. Albans City, 27 April 2013)
- Lowest attendance: 80 (Arlesey Town 3–0 Redditch United, 26 March 2013)
- Average attendance: 312

Pos	Team	Pld	W	D	L	GF	GA	GD	Pts	Promotion or relegation
1	Leamington	42	30	5	7	85	46	+39	95	Promoted to the Conference North
2	Stourbridge	42	25	8	9	94	42	+52	83	Qualified for the play-offs
3	Chesham United	42	21	12	9	69	48	+21	75	Qualified for the play-offs
4	Hemel Hempstead Town	42	22	6	14	95	72	+23	72	Qualified for the play-offs
5	Gosport Borough	42	19	13	10	78	43	+35	70	Qualified for the play-offs, then promoted to the Conference South
6	Arlesey Town	42	21	6	15	70	51	+19	69	
7	Barwell	42	19	12	11	67	50	+17	69	Transferred to the Northern Premier League Premier Division
8	Cambridge City	42	20	6	16	63	57	+6	66	
9	Weymouth	42	18	8	16	59	71	−12	62	
10	Bedford Town	42	18	7	17	61	56	+5	61	
11	St Albans City	42	18	6	18	81	71	+10	60	
12	St Neots Town	42	15	7	20	77	77	0	52	
13	Hitchin Town	42	15	7	20	62	68	−6	52	
14	AFC Totton	42	15	7	20	62	84	−22	52	
15	Chippenham Town	42	13	12	17	63	67	−4	51	
16	Banbury United	42	14	9	19	60	75	−15	51	
17	Bashley	42	13	10	19	47	63	−16	49	
18	Frome Town	42	11	12	19	40	55	−15	45	
19	Redditch United	42	12	7	23	32	65	−33	43	
20	Bideford	42	11	9	22	58	73	−15	42	
21	Bedworth United	42	11	9	22	39	73	−34	42	Relegated to NPL Division One South
22	Kettering Town	42	8	8	26	47	102	−55	22 (Note: Kettering Town deducted 10 points for financial irregularities.)	Relegated to Division One Central

Source: fchd.com
Rules for classification: 1) points; 2) goal difference; 3) number of goals scored.

=== Play-offs ===
Semifinals
2	Stourbridge	1
5	Gosport Borough	2
3	Chesham United	0
4	Hemel Hempstead Town	2

Final
4	Hemel Hempstead Town	2(4)
5	Gosport Borough	2(5)

Semi-finals

30 April 2013	Stourbridge	1–2	Gosport Borough	War Memorial Athletic Ground, Stourbridge
19:45	Bennett 27'		Williams 57'; Wooden 61'	Attendance: 993

30 April 2013	Chesham United	0–2	Hemel Hempstead Town	The Meadow, Chesham
19:45			Charles 24', 53'	Attendance: 1,136

Final

6 May 2013	Hemel Hempstead Town	2–2 (4–5 p)	Gosport Borough	Vauxhall Road, Hemel Hempstead
15:00	Hutton 85'; Osubu 90+3'		King 2'; Wilde 35'	Attendance: 1,000

=== Results ===
Home \ Away	TOT	ARL	BAN	BAR	BAS	BED	BWU	BID	CAM	CHE	CHI	FRO	GOS	HEM	HIT	KET	LEA	RED	SAC	STN	STB	WEY
AFC Totton		3–3	2–3	2–1	2–0	2–0	3–2	2–0	1–5	1–1	0–5	2–0	3–2	2–0	2–2	4–0	0–2	2–0	3–0	2–1	2–4	5–2
Arlesey Town	5–0		2–1	0–1	1–2	2–1	1–0	2–2	1–2	2–0	4–0	0–1	1–1	3–1	3–1	3–0	0–2	3–0	1–3	4–3	2–4	3–0
Banbury United	2–1	1–3		1–2	3–1	1–1	1–1	1–1	2–2	1–2	1–0	1–1	2–4	4–0	0–4	2–0	3–0	0–0	2–2	3–1	0–2	1–3
Barwell	1–0	2–0	4–1		0–0	2–1	2–0	1–1	1–0	1–3	0–0	1–1	1–2	2–2	1–0	1–2	1–3	0–0	1–3	2–3	2–1	0–1
Bashley	0–3	1–0	2–0	0–5		0–1	1–0	4–1	0–0	1–3	2–1	2–1	1–1	0–6	0–1	3–1	0–2	0–1	2–0	2–2	0–1	1–0
Bedford Town	4–1	0–0	3–1	3–0	0–1		0–1	3–1	2–1	0–1	1–1	0–1	1–0	0–3	1–4	1–1	2–2	2–1	2–0	3–0	2–0	0–2
Bedworth United	2–0	2–1	0–4	1–1	0–3	2–0		2–1	0–2	1–1	2–2	1–0	1–1	1–2	1–0	0–1	0–3	0–0	1–3	1–3	0–3	2–0
Bideford	1–1	1–1	1–2	1–2	0–0	0–3	3–0		2–1	2–1	1–2	0–0	0–2	3–2	3–2	4–0	0–1	3–2	1–0	0–0	2–2	2–1
Cambridge City	0–0	1–2	1–0	2–1	3–1	2–1	3–0	1–0		1–0	2–3	1–2	0–4	0–1	0–0	1–1	1–4	1–0	2–1	0–5	2–2	2–0
Chesham United	6–0	1–0	3–1	2–2	3–0	2–2	3–0	1–0	1–0		1–1	1–1	0–3	0–0	1–1	0–0	1–1	2–1	2–1	2–1	1–1	1–2
Chippenham Town	3–0	0–0	0–2	1–1	1–0	0–2	1–1	1–7	4–3	2–3		2–2	0–0	1–2	2–4	3–0	0–2	2–3	4–3	2–2	4–0	2–2
Frome Town	3–1	0–1	0–0	2–3	1–1	2–3	1–3	0–1	0–3	0–0	2–0		1–1	1–3	2–1	3–1	0–2	1–0	0–3	1–2	0–1	2–0
Gosport Borough	1–0	0–1	3–2	1–2	0–0	4–0	1–0	2–0	1–2	3–1	2–3	0–0		3–3	0–0	7–0	3–0	2–3	0–1	1–0	1–3	0–0
Hemel Hempstead Town	4–1	1–2	1–2	1–1	4–2	4–3	6–1	4–1	1–0	1–2	2–1	0–3	1–1		8–2	5–2	1–3	4–0	1–1	2–4	2–1	1–3
Hitchin Town	4–0	0–1	1–2	0–1	3–2	2–0	1–1	1–0	0–3	1–3	2–1	2–0	1–0	3–2		3–4	0–1	3–0	0–2	2–2	0–1	1–2
Kettering Town	1–1	1–3	1–1	1–2	0–7	3–0	1–4	3–1	1–2	3–1	2–4	1–1	1–3	1–2	3–1		1–3	0–1	2–6	1–0	0–1	1–6
Leamington	2–1	4–3	4–1	0–6	4–1	3–0	6–1	2–1	1–0	0–1	1–0	2–0	1–3	3–2	3–0	2–1		2–0	2–1	3–0	1–1	1–1
Redditch United	2–1	0–2	0–2	0–1	0–0	0–3	0–0	2–1	2–4	0–2	1–0	2–1	0–2	1–4	0–2	4–1	1–1		0–2	1–0	0–4	0–0
St Albans City	3–0	1–0	4–0	4–4	2–2	2–2	3–0	4–3	3–2	2–6	0–2	4–0	1–6	0–1	1–1	2–1	3–0	3–0		0–1	2–4	2–3
St Neots Town	1–3	1–2	3–2	2–2	2–2	1–3	3–2	5–3	2–3	3–1	0–1	0–1	2–3	6–1	2–3	4–3	0–1	1–2	3–2		0–0	4–2
Stourbridge	3–0	4–1	8–1	0–2	3–0	0–1	0–1	3–1	4–1	5–0	2–1	1–1	1–1	2–3	4–1	0–0	5–1	1–0	2–1	0–1		5–0
Weymouth	3–3	2–1	1–0	2–1	1–0	0–4	2–1	4–2	0–1	0–3	0–0	2–1	3–3	0–1	3–2	0–0	0–4	0–2	2–0	3–1	1–5	

Updated to match(es) played on 27 April 2013. Source: Southern Football League
Legend: Blue = home team win; Yellow = draw; Red = away team win.

=== Stadia and locations ===
Locations of the Premier Division clubs

Club	Stadium	Capacity
AFC Totton	Testwood Stadium	3,000
Arlesey Town	Hitchin Road	2,920
Banbury United	Spencer Stadium	2,000
Barwell	Kirkby Road	2,500
Bashley	Bashley Road	2,000
Bedford Town	The Eyrie	3,000
Bedworth United	The Oval	3,000
Bideford	The Sports Ground	2,000
Cambridge City	City Ground	2,300
Chesham United	The Meadow	5,000
Chippenham Town	Hardenhuish Park	2,815
Frome Town	Badgers Hill	2,000
Gosport Borough	Privett Park	4,500
Hemel Hempstead Town	Vauxhall Road	3,152
Hitchin Town	Top Field	4,000
Kettering Town	Nene Park, then Steel Park (groundshare with Corby Town)	6,441; 3,893
Leamington	New Windmill Ground	3,000
Redditch United	The Valley	5,000
St Albans City	Clarence Park	5,007
St Neots Town	New Rowley Park	3,500
Stourbridge	War Memorial Athletic Ground	2,626
Weymouth	Bob Lucas Stadium	6,600

== Division One Central ==
Division One Central consisted of 22 clubs, including 18 clubs from previous season and four new clubs:

- Godalming Town, transferred from Isthmian League Division One South
- Guildford City, promoted from the Combined Counties League
- Royston Town, promoted from the Spartan South Midlands League
- Thatcham Town, transferred from Division One South & West

Burnham won the division on the final day of the season and were promoted to the Premier Division along with play-off winners Biggleswade Town. Woodford United lost all their matches and were the only club relegated from division this season.

=== League table ===
Southern Football League Division One Central
- Season: 2012–13
- Champions: Burnham
- Promoted: Burnham; Biggleswade Town
- Relegated: Woodford United
- Matches: 462
- Goals: 1,645 (3.56 per match)
- Top goalscorer: Ryan Bird (Burnham) - 42
- Biggest home win: Ashford Town 10 – 0 Woodford United, 30 March 2013
- Biggest away win: Woodford United 0 – 10 Biggleswade Town, 19 March 2013
- Highest scoring: Woodford United 3 – 7 Chertsey Town, 1 December 2012
- Highest attendance: 448 (Burnham 1 – 0 Slough Town, 1 April 2013)
- Lowest attendance: 32 (Woodford United 0 – 5 Northwood, 2 February 2013)
- Average attendance: 113

Pos	Team	Pld	W	D	L	GF	GA	GD	Pts	Promotion or relegation
1	Burnham	42	31	6	5	108	39	+69	99	Promoted to the Premier Division
2	Rugby Town	42	31	3	8	103	45	+58	96	Qualified for the play-offs
3	Godalming Town	42	28	8	6	94	39	+55	92	Qualified for the play-offs, then transferred to Division One South & West
4	Biggleswade Town	42	26	7	9	97	50	+47	85	Qualified for the play-offs, then promoted to the Premier Division
5	Beaconsfield SYCOB	42	26	6	10	81	47	+34	84	Qualified for the play-offs
6	Slough Town	42	26	5	11	103	50	+53	83	
7	Royston Town	42	24	10	8	86	49	+37	82	
8	Daventry Town	42	22	10	10	81	47	+34	76	
9	Guildford City	42	20	6	16	86	75	+11	66	Transferred to Division One South & West
10	Ashford Town	42	17	10	15	85	79	+6	61	
11	Uxbridge	42	19	4	19	78	85	−7	61	
12	Aylesbury	42	16	10	16	76	73	+3	58	
13	Northwood	42	17	6	19	80	73	+7	57	
14	Barton Rovers	42	16	5	21	62	78	−16	53	
15	A.F.C. Hayes	42	13	8	21	73	81	−8	47	
16	Chalfont St Peter	42	18	7	17	76	74	+2	46 (Note: Chalfont St Peter deducted 15 points for fielding an ineligible player.)	
17	Thatcham Town	42	10	5	27	59	86	−27	35	Transferred to Division One South & West
18	Fleet Town	42	10	5	27	47	76	−29	35	Transferred to Division One South & West
19	North Greenford United	42	9	6	27	56	95	−39	33	
20	Chertsey Town	42	9	4	29	50	98	−48	31	
21	Leighton Town	42	6	5	31	43	121	−78	23	
22	Woodford United	42	0	0	42	21	185	−164	0	Relegated to the United Counties League

Source: fchd.com
Rules for classification: 1) points; 2) goal difference; 3) number of goals scored.

=== Play-offs ===
Semifinals
2	Rugby Town	1
5	Beaconsfield SYCOB	0
3	Godalming Town	1
4	Biggleswade Town	2

Final
2	Rugby Town	1
4	Biggleswade Town	3

Semi-finals

30 April 2013	Rugby Town	1–0 (a.e.t.)	Beaconsfield SYCOB	Butlin Road, Rugby
19:45	Youngs 98'			Attendance: 342

30 April 2013	Godalming Town	1–2	Biggleswade Town	Weycourt, Godalming
19:45	Dyer 56'		Woolf 6'; Daniel 80'	Attendance: 416

Final

6 May 2013	Rugby Town	1–3	Biggleswade Town	Butlin Road, Rugby
15:00	Kolodynski 58'		Allinson 64'; Barnes 86', 88'	Attendance: 1,126

=== Results ===
Home \ Away	HAY	ASH	AYB	BAR	BEA	BIG	BUR	CHA	CHE	DAV	FLE	GOD	GUI	LEI	NGU	NOR	ROY	RUG	SLO	THA	UXB	WOO
A.F.C. Hayes		3–1	3–4	3–1	6–0	1–1	0–3	1–3	3–0	1–1	3–1	2–2	3–4	1–3	1–2	0–6	2–2	1–3	0–3	1–1	1–2	3–0
Ashford Town	2–1		1–1	2–2	2–1	4–0	2–3	1–1	2–1	3–2	5–0	1–5	1–3	3–1	3–2	4–0	1–1	1–4	0–1	1–1	3–5	10–0
Aylesbury	6–2	2–2		2–1	2–1	3–2	2–2	2–2	3–1	0–2	1–4	0–5	1–2	1–1	1–1	3–0	1–1	0–2	1–4	3–0	5–2	7–0
Barton Rovers	0–0	1–2	3–2		1–4	1–2	1–6	1–1	3–0	1–2	2–0	0–2	3–1	3–0	2–1	2–1	1–3	0–1	2–2	2–0	1–3	2–1
Beaconsfield SYCOB	2–2	0–2	1–1	3–1		4–0	2–1	2–0	4–0	3–1	4–2	0–2	3–2	1–0	3–0	0–2	1–0	1–2	1–1	2–1	1–1	3–0
Biggleswade Town	3–1	4–2	1–1	5–2	1–0		0–3	5–2	5–1	0–1	1–0	3–2	2–1	2–2	5–0	2–0	2–1	1–0	2–1	2–1	3–1	2–1
Burnham	2–1	3–0	2–0	3–2	0–0	0–3		1–0	2–0	2–2	1–0	1–0	3–2	6–0	5–1	2–0	1–1	2–3	1–0	5–1	2–1	7–0
Chalfont St Peter	5–1	2–2	3–1	2–3	1–3	0–5	1–1		2–1	1–4	2–1	2–2	2–1	1–0	1–1	0–4	1–2	0–3	1–2	2–0	3–0	7–1
Chertsey Town	0–1	1–1	1–2	0–3	1–4	0–4	0–4	1–2		1–5	1–0	1–0	1–3	2–2	2–1	3–2	1–2	1–1	1–3	2–4	3–2	4–1
Daventry Town	0–2	2–1	0–0	3–0	0–1	1–1	3–4	2–1	2–0		2–1	1–2	1–1	4–0	1–1	1–0	4–2	4–1	3–1	1–1	4–1	3–0
Fleet Town	0–3	2–0	1–0	0–2	0–1	0–2	0–3	1–3	3–1	0–1		0–3	2–2	0–1	4–0	1–2	0–0	2–1	2–5	0–2	2–4	5–0
Godalming Town	1–3	3–3	1–0	1–0	0–2	1–0	1–0	4–0	1–1	1–0	2–0		2–0	5–0	1–1	1–1	3–0	2–2	1–2	2–1	4–1	4–0
Guildford City	0–2	2–3	0–1	4–2	0–1	1–3	0–3	3–2	2–1	2–0	4–1	1–1		1–0	3–2	3–1	2–2	2–1	1–1	2–2	2–1	4–1
Leighton Town	0–5	0–1	3–5	0–2	2–4	0–4	2–3	0–3	1–4	2–3	0–0	1–4	0–6		0–2	2–3	1–1	1–2	0–3	3–1	0–1	4–0
North Greenford United	3–2	1–3	0–1	1–2	0–2	0–0	0–3	3–2	4–1	1–2	1–3	2–4	5–4	3–4		1–3	1–2	1–2	1–3	0–3	3–4	1–0
Northwood	5–3	1–3	3–2	2–2	2–3	1–1	1–2	1–3	2–3	1–1	3–1	1–2	1–2	3–0	1–1		2–3	0–3	2–1	2–1	3–0	5–1
Royston Town	2–0	2–0	3–2	3–0	3–2	3–1	1–1	4–2	1–0	2–1	0–0	1–3	3–2	8–0	2–0	2–2		0–1	2–0	2–0	4–2	5–0
Rugby Town	2–1	4–0	3–0	5–0	3–0	2–2	2–3	2–1	2–1	2–0	2–0	0–3	6–1	5–0	3–0	1–2	2–1		0–4	4–2	6–2	2–0
Slough Town	2–1	6–1	4–3	3–1	1–1	3–1	2–0	0–1	3–0	1–1	3–1	2–3	1–2	5–1	3–0	5–0	3–1	2–3		4–1	1–3	4–0
Thatcham Town	1–1	3–2	1–2	2–1	1–2	1–4	0–2	0–1	2–0	0–4	2–4	1–2	1–3	1–0	0–2	1–4	0–2	0–1	0–2		2–1	5–0
Uxbridge	1–0	2–2	2–1	0–1	0–2	1–0	2–3	1–2	2–0	2–2	1–1	1–4	3–2	5–1	2–1	1–0	0–2	1–2	3–2	5–4		4–0
Woodford United	1–3	0–2	0–1	0–2	0–6	0–10	0–7	1–5	3–7	0–4	0–2	1–2	0–3	4–5	2–5	0–5	1–4	0–7	1–4	1–8	0–2	

Updated to match(es) played on unknown. Source: Southern Football League
Legend: Blue = home team win; Yellow = draw; Red = away team win.

=== Stadia and locations ===
Locations of Division One Central clubs
Greater London Division One Central Clubs

Club	Stadium	Capacity
A.F.C. Hayes	Farm Park	1,500
Ashford Town	The Robert Parker Stadium	2,550
Aylesbury	Haywood Way	1,300
Barton Rovers	Sharpenhoe Road	4,000
Beaconsfield SYCOB	Holloways Park	3,500
Biggleswade Town	The Carlsberg Stadium	3,000
Burnham	The Gore	2,500
Chalfont St Peter	Mill Meadow	1,500
Chertsey Town	Alwyns Lane	2,500
Daventry Town	Communications Park	5,000
Fleet Town	Calthorpe Park	2,000
Godalming Town	Weycourt	3,000
Guildford City	Guildford Spectrum	2,000
Leighton Town	Bell Close	2,800
North Greenford United	Berkeley Fields	2,000
Northwood	Northwood Park	3,075
Royston Town	Garden Walk	5,000
Rugby Town	Butlin Road	6,000
Slough Town	Holloways Park (groundshare with Beaconsfield SYCOB)	3,500
Thatcham Town	Waterside Park	1,500
Uxbridge	Honeycroft	3,770
Woodford United	Byfield Road	3,000

== Division One South & West ==
Division One South & West consisted of 22 clubs, including 16 clubs from previous season and four new clubs:

- Three clubs relegated from the Premier Division:
  - Cirencester Town
  - Evesham United
  - Swindon Supermarine
- Plus:
  - Merthyr Town, promoted from the Western League
  - Shortwood United, promoted from the Hellenic League
  - Winchester City, promoted from the Wessex League

Poole Town won the division in their second season in the league, and were promoted to the Premier Division along with play-off winners Hungerford Town. Winchester City finished bottom and left the Southern League for the Wessex League for the second time in four seasons.

Sholing resigned at the end of the season for financial reasons, and dropped down to the Wessex League.

On 12 May 2013, Abingdon United also resigned from the league for financial reasons, and dropped down to the Hellenic League.

=== League table ===
Southern Football League Division One South & West
- Season: 2012–13
- Champions: Poole Town
- Promoted: Poole Town; Hungerford Town
- Relegated: Winchester City; Sholing (resigned); Abingdon United (resigned)
- Matches: 462
- Goals: 1,359 (2.94 per match)
- Top goalscorer: Lee Wort (Sholing) - 33
- Biggest home win: Merthyr Town 10–0 Winchester City, 6 April 2013
- Biggest away win: Cirencester Town 1–6 Bridgwater Town, 15 December 2012; Bridgwater Town 0–5 Shortwood United, 7 March 2013
- Highest attendance: 726 (Wimborne Town 0–2 Poole Town, 1 January 2013)
- Lowest attendance: 33 (Winchester City 0–4 Cirencester Town, 30 March 2013)
- Average attendance: 148

Pos	Team	Pld	W	D	L	GF	GA	GD	Pts	Promotion or relegation
1	Poole Town	42	30	8	4	82	36	+46	98	Promoted to the Premier Division
2	Hungerford Town	42	26	6	10	71	44	+27	84	Qualified for the play-offs, then promoted to the Premier Division
3	Merthyr Town	42	24	11	7	84	38	+46	83	Qualified for the play-offs
4	Swindon Supermarine	42	25	6	11	79	51	+28	81	Qualified for the play-offs
5	Paulton Rovers	42	23	6	13	64	54	+10	75	Qualified for the play-offs
6	Yate Town	42	21	6	15	69	63	+6	69	
7	Sholing	42	20	8	14	87	56	+31	68	Resigned to the Wessex League
8	Shortwood United	42	20	7	15	62	45	+17	67	
9	North Leigh	42	19	4	19	70	69	+1	61	
10	Cinderford Town	42	17	8	17	61	66	−5	59	
11	Cirencester Town	42	15	13	14	54	57	−3	57 (Note: Cirencester Town deducted one point for fielding an ineligible player.)	
12	Wimborne Town	42	15	10	17	59	60	−1	55	
13	Mangotsfield United	42	15	10	17	53	61	−8	55	
14	Evesham United	42	14	9	19	49	58	−9	51	
15	Clevedon Town	42	12	13	17	61	67	−6	49	
16	Tiverton Town	42	11	14	17	51	58	−7	47	
17	Didcot Town	42	12	10	20	59	76	−17	46	
18	Taunton Town	42	12	8	22	59	85	−26	44	
19	Bridgwater Town	42	10	10	22	52	78	−26	40	
20	Abingdon United	42	10	8	24	42	66	−24	38	Resigned to the Hellenic League
21	Bishop's Cleeve	42	10	7	25	49	66	−17	37	
22	Winchester City	42	9	2	31	42	105	−63	26 (Note: Winchester City deducted three points for fielding an ineligible player against Taunton Town on the first day of the season.)	Relegated to the Wessex League

Source: fchd.com
Rules for classification: 1) points; 2) goal difference; 3) number of goals scored.

=== Play-offs ===
Semifinals
2	Hungerford Town	4
5	Paulton Rovers	2
3	Merthyr Town	2(3)
4	Swindon Supermarine	2(2)

Final
2	Hungerford Town	3
3	Merthyr Town	1

Semi-finals

29 April 2013	Hungerford Town	4–2 (a.e.t.)	Paulton Rovers	Bulpit Lane, Hungerford
19:45	Draycott 10', 96' (pen.); Clark 45'; Brewer 107'		Billing 79'; Brice 90+1'	Attendance: 219

30 April 2013	Merthyr Town	2–2 (a.e.t.) (3–2 p)	Swindon Supermarine	Penydarren Park, Merthyr Tydfil
19:45	Traylor 15'; Prosser 90+4' (pen.)		Parsons 45' (pen.); Edenborough 64'	Attendance: 761

Final

6 May 2013	Hungerford Town	3–1 (a.e.t.)	Merthyr Town	Bulpit Lane, Hungerford
	Draycott 46'; Herring 104'; Goodyer 107'		Newman 50'	Attendance: 813

=== Results ===
Home \ Away	ABI	BIS	BRI	CIN	CIR	CLE	DID	EVE	HUN	MAN	MER	NRL	PAU	POO	SHO	SHR	SWI	TAU	TIV	WIM	WIN	YAT
Abingdon United		2–0	3–1	3–0	0–2	3–1	0–1	1–0	0–0	1–2	0–0	0–2	0–0	0–4	1–3	0–2	1–3	3–0	2–0	1–3	1–2	1–2
Bishops Cleeve	2–0		1–1	1–4	0–3	1–0	4–1	3–0	1–2	2–2	2–3	1–2	0–1	1–1	0–1	0–2	1–2	3–0	2–3	1–3	5–1	0–2
Bridgwater Town	3–0	3–0		1–0	1–1	0–2	1–1	1–1	1–2	1–1	0–1	1–4	1–3	1–4	2–2	0–5	0–4	0–3	0–0	0–0	3–0	1–2
Cinderford Town	1–0	2–1	2–1		1–2	2–1	3–3	3–2	1–0	1–1	0–0	4–3	3–1	1–2	3–2	1–2	0–1	2–1	1–3	0–1	2–0	2–2
Cirencester Town	2–1	2–4	1–6	2–2		3–1	2–0	1–3	0–3	1–0	0–0	1–3	1–3	0–1	3–2	0–1	0–0	2–1	1–1	1–1	3–1	1–2
Clevedon Town	2–3	1–1	1–1	1–1	3–2		1–1	1–1	2–5	2–2	1–2	2–1	0–1	0–0	3–1	0–0	1–2	1–1	3–1	3–1	1–4	1–1
Didcot Town	1–0	0–1	0–2	1–1	2–2	2–1		0–1	1–2	2–3	0–1	1–0	3–4	0–4	1–0	1–0	1–2	3–0	4–1	2–2	5–2	2–0
Evesham United	1–1	1–0	0–1	1–2	0–0	3–2	2–4		0–1	0–2	1–1	1–0	0–2	2–3	1–0	1–2	0–2	2–4	2–0	3–0	0–2	3–0
Hungerford Town	2–0	1–0	2–0	3–2	0–1	1–3	6–1	2–1		2–1	0–4	4–2	2–1	0–0	3–0	3–1	1–0	3–2	1–0	0–0	1–1	1–1
Mangotsfield United	2–1	3–0	1–0	1–3	0–1	4–3	1–0	0–0	1–0		0–2	2–0	3–3	0–3	0–0	0–3	2–3	1–2	2–2	3–1	1–0	1–2
Merthyr Town	3–2	2–1	4–0	1–2	0–0	2–3	3–0	1–0	3–0	3–0		1–1	0–1	2–2	2–2	1–0	3–2	2–0	0–3	3–1	10–0	1–2
North Leigh	5–3	1–3	3–1	2–1	1–0	1–3	4–2	1–3	1–4	1–1	1–3		0–0	4–0	3–1	1–1	2–1	0–2	1–3	2–0	2–0	1–2
Paulton Rovers	1–0	1–0	1–4	2–0	1–0	0–1	0–0	1–1	0–2	2–0	2–1	3–1		1–2	2–0	4–1	3–1	3–3	2–1	0–3	2–1	3–2
Poole Town	1–1	1–0	2–1	4–0	3–0	2–0	4–1	1–0	1–1	1–0	3–2	1–0	1–0		2–1	3–0	2–0	4–1	2–0	1–0	2–0	2–3
Sholing	3–0	3–0	8–1	2–0	2–3	4–2	2–2	7–1	1–2	2–1	2–2	5–0	1–0	1–1		2–0	5–1	4–0	2–2	1–0	4–1	3–1
Shortwood United	3–0	1–0	0–2	1–2	0–0	1–1	1–0	2–1	1–0	0–1	0–1	1–2	5–1	3–0	2–3		3–0	2–1	2–2	2–2	4–0	1–0
Swindon Supermarine	2–1	2–0	2–1	2–1	1–1	1–2	2–0	0–0	1–0	3–1	2–2	4–3	2–1	5–1	3–1	2–2		3–0	2–1	1–2	4–0	3–0
Taunton Town	1–1	3–2	3–0	4–1	0–0	3–2	1–5	0–2	2–0	2–2	1–2	0–2	0–2	1–1	2–2	0–1	3–2		0–0	1–0	4–3	2–5
Tiverton Town	0–0	1–1	1–1	0–0	1–2	1–0	2–2	2–2	1–3	0–1	1–1	1–2	3–4	1–2	1–0	2–1	0–2	2–1		2–0	3–0	2–0
Wimborne Town	2–2	1–1	4–3	1–3	2–2	0–0	2–2	0–1	1–3	3–1	0–3	2–1	0–1	0–2	0–1	1–0	2–1	5–1	2–0		1–0	5–1
Winchester City	0–1	0–2	1–3	1–0	0–4	0–2	4–0	1–3	0–1	3–4	0–3	0–2	2–1	1–3	2–0	1–2	1–3	3–2	0–0	1–4		2–1
Yate Town	1–2	1–1	2–1	3–1	3–1	1–1	2–1	1–2	4–2	1–0	0–3	0–2	3–0	1–3	0–1	3–1	0–0	2–1	2–1	3–1	6–1	

Updated to match(es) played on unknown. Source: Southern Football League
Legend: Blue = home team win; Yellow = draw; Red = away team win.

=== Stadia and locations ===
Locations of Division One South & West clubs

Club	Stadium	Capacity
Abingdon United	Northcourt Road	2,000
Bishops Cleeve	Kayte Lane	1,500
Bridgwater Town	Fairfax Park	2,500
Cinderford Town	Causeway Ground	3,500
Cirencester Town	Corinium Stadium	4,500
Clevedon Town	Hand Stadium	3,500
Didcot Town	Draycott Engineering Loop Meadow Stadium	3,000
Evesham United	Spiers and Hartwell Jubilee Stadium	3,000
Hungerford Town	Bulpit Lane	2,500
Mangotsfield United	Cossham Street	2,500
Merthyr Town	Penydarren Park	10,000
North Leigh	Eynsham Hall Park Sports Ground	2,000
Paulton Rovers	Athletic Field	2,500
Poole Town	Tatnam Ground	2,500
Sholing	Universal Stadium	1,000
Shortwood United	Meadowbank Ground	2,000
Swindon Supermarine	Hunts Copse Ground	3,000
Taunton Town	Wordsworth Drive	2,500
Tiverton Town	Ladysmead	3,500
Wimborne Town	The Cuthbury	3,250
Winchester City	The City Ground	4,500
Yate Town	Lodge Road	2,000

== League Cup ==
2012–13 Southern League Cup
Tournament details
- Country: England
- Teams: 66

Final positions
- Champions: Arlesey Town
- Runners-up: Frome Town

The Southern League Cup 2012–13 (billed as the RedInsure Cup 2012–13 for sponsorship reasons) is the 75th season of the Southern League Cup, the cup competition of the Southern Football League.

=== Preliminary round ===
25 September 2012	Aylesbury	2 – 1	Barton Rovers
	French 26'; Vincente 80'		Case 19'	Attendance: 36

4 October 2012	Bishops Cleeve	3 – 3 (a.e.t.) (5 – 4 p)	Evesham United
	Davis 27'; Gatton 105', 109'		Downing 29'; Palmer 100'; Osborne 104'	Attendance: 55

=== First round ===
22 September 2012	Bedford Town	5 – 0	Leighton Town
	Fuller 42 42'; Ivy 55', 56', 71'; Peacock 89'			Attendance: 155

29 September 2012	Fleet Town	0 – 4	Northwood
			Bellotti 22', 25', 75'; Hawkins 38'	Attendance: 60

6 October 2012	Tiverton Town	3 – 2	Taunton Town
	Howe 50'; Bushin 74'; Hill 90'		Irish 8'; Herrod 58'	Attendance: 187

15 October 2012	Beaconsfield SYCOB	2 – 0	Chesham United
	Montgomery 54', 90'			Attendance: 87

15 October 2012	Hitchin Town	2 – 0	St Neots Town
	Delderfield 20'; Frendo 57'			Attendance: 132

16 October 2012	Abingdon United	3 – 5	Daventry Town
	Nowell 2'; Tucker 21'; Self 23'		McCready 3', 47', 65'; Olton 15'; Cross 82'	Attendance: 32

16 October 2012	Hayes	3 – 1	Uxbridge
	Mendhi 28'; Shennan 50'; Williams 89'		Kabamba 13'	Attendance: 48

16 October 2012	Aylesbury	3 – 2	Cambridge City
	Constant 54'; Morlese 56'; Connor 89'		Hammond 25'; Brighton 35'	Attendance: 63

16 October 2012	Banbury United	1 – 2	North Leigh
	Polk 52'; Cole 69' (pen.); Mills 74'		Kabamba 13'	Attendance: 46

16 October 2012	Bedworth United	1 – 2 (a.e.t.)	Barwell
	Spencer 24'		Weale 15'; Lavery 116'	Attendance: 101

16 October 2012	Bedworth United	1 – 0	Royston Town
	Daniel 29'			Attendance: 107

16 October 2012	Bridgwater Town	1 – 1 (a.e.t.)	Bideford
	Thomas 60'		Andrew 6'	Attendance: 90

16 October 2012	Burnham	1 – 2	Ashford Town
	Wilment 41'		Kazi 71'; Lockhart-Adams 90'	Attendance: 42

16 October 2012	Chalfont St Peter	0 – 1	Slough Town
			Logie 10'	Attendance: 70

16 October 2012	Chippenham Town	0 – 3	Paulton Rovers
			Billing 20'; Osman 33'; Cleverley 82'	Attendance: 145

16 October 2012	Cinderford Town	5 – 1	Bishops Cleeve
	Norris 28', 48', 49'; Smith 51'; Lee 57'		Tamplin 75'	Attendance: 47

16 October 2012	Merthyr Town	0 – 2	Yate Town
			Bryant 13'; Hiroli 81'	Attendance: 142

16 October 2012	North Greenford United	4 – 2	Godalming Town
	Jackson 41'; Hind 44' (pen.), 77' (pen.); Silcott 51'		Palmer 39'; Harris 90'	Attendance: 35

16 October 2012	Poole Town	3 – 0	Weymouth
	Wilson 30', 89'; Kelly 58'			Attendance: 228

16 October 2012	St Albans City	2 – 3	Hemel Hempstead Town
	Hayles 16'; Graham 53'		Campana 38'; Judge 69'; Osubu 80'	Attendance: 117

16 October 2012	Stourbridge	4 – 1	Redditch United
	Oliver 15'; Canavan 47', 74'; Night 76'		Deards 90+2'	Attendance: 171

16 October 2012	Thatcham Town	0 – 6	Hungerford Town
			Draycott 18', 42', 58', 90'; Wood 28'; Hopper 50'	Attendance: 110

16 October 2012	Woodford United	1 – 5	Didcot Town
	Hines 89'		Ricketts 24' (pen.); Hasham 71', 80'; Novell 77'; Concanon 88'	Attendance: 34

17 October 2012	Frome Town	1 – 0	Cirencester Town
	Gilroy 35'			Attendance: 82

17 October 2012	Guildford City	3 – 5 (a.e.t.)	Chertsey Town
	Moody 11'; Guildford 25'; Gacheru 65'		Pomroy 16'; Carr 78', 92'; Frostic 81'; Briggs 93'	Attendance: 62

17 October 2012	Swindon Supermarine	0 – 1	Shortwood United
			Martin 72'	Attendance: 63

23 October 2012	Wimborne Town	3 – 0	Bashley
	Jeffes 16', 68'; Blake 20'			Attendance: 111

24 October 2012	Sholing	2 – 1	AFC Totton
	Wort 13', 50'		Gillespie 45'	Attendance: 74

29 October 2012	Mangotsfield United	2 – 1	Clevedon Town
	Marshall 71'; Klein-Davies 87'		Best 52'	Attendance: 139

30 October 2012	Rugby Town	1 – 2	Leamington
	Kolodynski 90+1'		Berwick 16', 54'	Attendance: 198

6 November 2012	Winchester City	3 – 3 (a.e.t.) (1–4 p)	Gosport Borough
	Penfold 8'; Cook o.g.' (53); Taylor 55'		Bennett 3'; Igoe 20'; Cook 83'	Attendance: 33

=== Second round ===
19 November 2012	Hungerford Town	0 – 1	North Leigh
			Else 45'	Attendance: 64

19 November 2012	Mangotsfield United	1 – 3	Shortwood United
	Winter 80'		Langworthy 6'; Coates 14'; Bennett 61'	Attendance: 70

20 November 2012	Arlesey Town	2 – 2 (a.e.t.) (4-3 p)	Biggleswade Town
	Draycott 64'; Gatty 70' (o.g.)		Mason 45+1'; Daniel 90+4'	Attendance: 84

20 November 2012	Bedford Town	3 – 2 (a.e.t.)	Hitchin Town
	Green 68'; Fuller 76', 115' (pen.)		Taylor 40', 75'	Attendance: 125

20 November 2012	Chertsey Town	1 – 5	Hemel Hempstead Town
	Quintyne 42'		Nolan 51', 62'; Mpi 60'; Parkes 72'; O'Toole 82'	Attendance: 53

20 November 2012	Daventry Town	2 – 3	Barwell
	Cross 67'; Liburd 81'		West 27'; Edwards 65', 88'	Attendance: 62

20 November 2012	Didcot Town	1 – 0	Beaconsfield SYCOB
	Stanley 47'			Attendance: 59

20 November 2012	North Greenford United	2 – 6	AFC Hayes
	O'Connor 10'; Balal 72'		Harewood 6', 66'; Mugisha 16', 17', 42'; Dyett 52'	Attendance: 45

20 November 2012	Northwood	1 – 0	Ashford Town
	Bellotti 60'			Attendance: 45

20 November 2012	Stourbridge	1 – 2	Leamington
	Fitzpatrick 58'		Adkins 50'; Batchelor 79'	Attendance: 202

21 November 2012	Wimborne Town	3 – 0	Poole Town
	Hubbard 17' (pen.), 89'; Smith 90+1'			Attendance: 332

27 November 2012	Yate Town	1 – 2	Cinderford Town
	Sarr 66'		O'Sullivan 14'; Malcolm 85'	Attendance: 75

28 November 2012	Frome Town	5 – 2	Bridgwater Town
	Gilroy 4', 49'; Smith 15'; Lapham 37'; Middleton 52' (o.g.)		Fitzpatrick 64'; Legg 83'	Attendance: 73

28 November 2012	Sholing	1 – 0	Gosport Borough
	Musselwhite 63'			Attendance: 58

4 December 2012	Aylesbury	0 – 1 (a.e.t.)	Slough Town
			Marsh-Brown 112' (o.g.)	Attendance: 78

4 December 2012	Tiverton Town	1 – 4	Paulton Rovers
	Emati-Emati 90'		Barnes 14', 88'; Vyner 27'; Osman 38' (pen.)	Attendance: 87

=== Third Round ===
8 January 2013	Barwell	0 – 1	Leamington	Kirkby Road, Barwell
			Chilton 88'	Attendance: 142

8 January 2013	Bedford Town	1 – 2	Arlesey Town	The New Eyrie, Cardington
	Grimes 71'		Mawer 19'; Dillon 31'	Attendance: 136

8 January 2013	North Leigh	2 – 4	Cinderford Town	Eynsham Hall Park Sports Ground, North Leigh
	Mills 19'; Hopkins 80'		D. Evans 7', 44', 67', 81'	Attendance: 51

8 January 2013	Northwood	2 – 1	Hemel Hempstead Town	Northwood Park, Northwood
	Hawkins 1'; Hewitt 44'		Hewitt 29' (o.g.)	Attendance: 76

8 January 2013	Shortwood United	2 – 3	Didcot Town	The Meadowbank Ground, Nailsworth
	Haddock 27'; Tustain 81'		Osborne-Ricketts 12'; Williams 57'; Rutter 88' (o.g.)	Attendance: 56

8 January 2013	Slough Town	3 – 1 (a.e.t.)	AFC Hayes	Holloways Park, Beaconsfield
	Rhone 29'; Parsons 93'; Burnell 119' (pen.)		Brown 10' (o.g.)	Attendance: 77

9 January 2013	Frome Town	3 – 2 (a.e.t.)	Paulton Rovers	Aldersmith Stadium, Frome
	Johnson 90+3'; Brigham 103', 113' (pen.)		Billing 35'; Stone 101'	Attendance: 162

9 January 2013	Sholing	4 – 3	Wimborne Town	The Silverlake Arena, Sholing
	Musselwhite 29', 66'; Ba. Mason 31'; Fennemore 90+3'		Kimble 37', 78'; Hubbard 83'	Attendance: 75

=== Quarter-finals ===
5 February 2013	Arlesey Town	6 – 0	Didcot Town	aRMadillo Stadium, Arlesey
	Dillon 42', 48'; Hibbert 53'; Miller 59'; Thorne 76'; Mawer 79'			Attendance: 61

6 February 2013	Frome Town	3 – 2	Sholing	Aldersmith Stadium, Frome
	Perrott 53'; Gilroy 66'; Cooper 90'		Castle 38'; Ba. Mason 62'	Attendance: 163

6 February 2013	Leamington	3 – 1	Cinderford Town	New Windmill Ground, Whitnash
	S. Moore 51'; Batchelor 60' (pen.), 90+2'		Malcolm 26'	Attendance: 163

21 February 2013	Slough Town	2 – 1	Northwood	Holloways Park, Beaconsfield
	Smith 34', 68' (pen.)		Walker 88'	Attendance: 61

=== Semi-final ===
26 February 2013	Leamington	1 – 2	Arlesey Town	New Windmill Ground, Whitnash
	Story 1'		Roberts 14' (pen.); Thorne 77'	Attendance: 170

6 March 2013	Frome Town	2 – 1	Slough Town	Aldersmith Stadium, Frome
	Clarke 28'; Bryant 33'		O'Toole 17'	Attendance: 149

=== Final ===
First leg

19 March 2013	Arlesey Town	1 – 0	Frome Town	aRMadillo Stadium, Arlesey
	Dillon 48'			Attendance: 105

Second leg

9 April 2013	Frome Town	1 – 1 (a.e.t.) (1 – 2 agg.)	Arlesey Town	Aldersmith Stadium, Frome
	Evans 45+1'		Dillon 102'	Attendance: 281

== See also ==
- Southern Football League
- 2012–13 Isthmian League
- 2012–13 Northern Premier League
