= Southern Football League Cup (England) =

Football tournament

- Founded: 1932
- Region: England
- Most championships: Yeovil Town (4)
- Website: Southern League Website

The Southern League Cup was a knock-out cup competition organised by the Southern Football League. The winning team were presented with the Southern League Challenge Trophy (trophy photograph). It was inaugurated in 1932 after receiving sanction from the Football Association, with the first competition taking place in the 1932–33 season.

Apart from two breaks, 1940–1945 owing to World War 2, and 2020–2021 owing to the COVID-19 pandemic, the tournament took place each year until 2022, after which it was discontinued.

== Names and Sponsors ==
- 1984– : Bill Dellow Cup
- 1987–1990: Westgate Insurance Cup
- 1990–1991: Larchimage Windows Cup
- 1991–1993: Barclays Commercial Services Cup
- 1993–2004: Doc Martens Cup
- 2005–2007: Errea Cup
- 2008–2009: GX Cup
- 2009–2011: Red Insure Cup
- 2017–2018: BigFreeBet.com Challenge Cup (it was announced that proceeds from the deal would contribute to developing the league and the growth in grassroots English football).
- 2018–19: City Security Services Ltd League Challenge Cup

== Finals: Winners and runners-up ==
Season	Winners †	Result ‡	Runners-up †	Ref.
1932–33	Plymouth Argyle Reserves (WD)	6–3 (0–0; 6–3)	Folkestone (ED)	
1933–34	Plymouth Argyle Reserves (WD)	4–1 (3–0; 1–1)	Tunbridge Wells Rangers (ED)	
1934–35	Folkestone (ED)	5–4 (4–1; 1–3)	Yeovil & Petters United (WD)	
1935–36	Plymouth Argyle Reserves (WD)	12–2 (7–0; 5–2)	Tunbridge Wells Rangers (ED)	
1936–37	Newport County Reserves	6–5 (4–1; 2–4)	Norwich City Reserves	
1937–38	Colchester United	4–3 (1–2; 3–1)	Yeovil & Petters United	
1938–39	Competition not completed: Plymouth Argyle Reserves qualified for the final; the Colchester United versus Norwich City Reserves semi-final, carried over to the following season, was not completed as Colchester United ceased playing owing to World War 2.			
1939–40	Worcester City (WS)	7–3 (3–1; 4–2) (war-time comp.)	Chelmsford City (ES)	
1940 to 1945	Competition cancelled owing to World War 2			
1945–46	Chelmsford City	9–4 (3–3; 6–1)	Worcester City	
1946–47	Gillingham	4–2 (4–1; 0–1)	Yeovil Town	
1947–48	Merthyr Tydfil	5–0 (single match)	Colchester United	
1948–49	Yeovil Town	3–0 (single match)	Colchester United	
1949–50	Colchester United	6–4 (3–0; 3–4 (aet))	Bath City	
1950–51	Merthyr Tydfil	6–5 (3–1; 3–4)	Guildford City	
1951–52	Hereford United	5–1 (2–1; 3–0)	Guildford City	
1952–53	Headington United	4–3 (1–2; 3–1(aet))	Weymouth	
1953–54	Headington United	2–0 (2–0; 0–0)	Lovell's Athletic	
1954–55	Yeovil Town	3–1 (0–0, 3–1)	Tonbridge	
1955–56	Gloucester City	6–5 (1–4, 5–1(aet))	Yeovil Town	
1956–57	Hereford United	5–2 (2–1; 3–1)	Tonbridge	
1957–58	Cheltenham Town	4–1 (2–0; 2–1)	Gravesend & Northfleet	
1958–59	Hereford United (NW-D)	6–3 (1–2; 5–1(aet))	Bath City (NW-D)	
1959–60	Chelmsford City (PD)	4–2 (2–1; 2–1)	Worcester City (PD)	
1960–61	Yeovil Town (PD)	5–3 (3–0; 0–3(aet); 2–0(r))	Chelmsford City (PD)	
1961–62	Cambridge United (PD)	4–3 (2–2; 2–1)	Margate (D1)	
1962–63	Guildford City (PD)	2–1 (0–0; 2–1)	Nuneaton Borough (D1)	
1963–64	Burton Albion (D1)	5–2 (1–2; 4–0)	Weymouth (PD)	
1964–65	Cambridge United (PD)	3–1 (0–1; 3–0)	Weymouth (PD)	
1965–66	Yeovil Town (PD)	2–1 (2–1; 0–0)	Guildford City (PD)	
1966–67	Guildford City (PD)	2–1 (2–1; 0–0)	Barnet (PD)	
1967–68	Margate (PD)	4–2 (1–1; 0–0(aet); 3–1)	Ramsgate Athletic (D1)	
1968–69	Cambridge United (PD)	1–0 (1–0; 0–0)	Cheltenham Town (PD)	
1969–70	Wimbledon (PD)	4–1 (3–0; 1–1)	Romford (PD)	
1970–71	Telford United (PD)	3–2 (2–1; 1–1)	Weymouth (PD)	
1971–72	Barnet (PD)	4–4 (pens: 7–6) (2–0; 0–2(aet); 2–2(r)(aet)(p:7–6))	Hereford United (PD)	
1972–73	Weymouth (PD)	3–0 (2–0; 1–0)	Hillingdon Borough (PD)	
1973–74	AP Leamington (D1N)	3–1 (0–1; 3–0)	Bromsgrove Rovers (D1N)	
1974–75	Kettering Town (PD)	3–1 (2–0; 1–1)	Margate (PD)	
1975–76	Wimbledon (PD)	3–2 (1–1; 2–1)	Yeovil Town (PD)	
1976–77	Dartford (PD)	3–1 (1–1; 2–0)	Yeovil Town (PD)	
1977–78	Gravesend & Northfleet (PD)	2–0 (0–0; 2–0(aet))	Weymouth (PD)	
1978–79	Bath City (PD)	1–0 (1–0; 0–0)	Yeovil Town (PD)	
1979–80	Kidderminster Harriers (MD)	4–1 (0–0; 4–1)	Dartford (SD)	
1980–81	Bedford Town (MD)	3–1 (2–1; 1–0)	Bognor Regis Town (SD)	
1981–82	Wealdstone (SD)	2–0 (1–0; 1–0)	Gloucester City (MD)	
1982–83	Alvechurch (PD)	7–2 (6–1; 1–1)	Waterlooville (PD)	
1983–84	AP Leamington (PD)	3–0 (0–0; 3–0(aet))	Dartford (PD)	
1984–85	Fisher Athletic (PD)	6–2 (2–1; 4–1)	Cheltenham Town (PD)	
1985–86	Bromsgrove Rovers (MD)	4–3 (2–1; 2–2)	Trowbridge Town (SD)	
1986–87	Waterlooville (SD)	3–1 (2–1; 1–0)	Hednesford Town (MD)	
1987–88	Dartford (PD)	4–3 (1–3; 3–0)	Bromsgrove Rovers (PD)	
1988–89	Dartford (PD)	3–1 (1–1; 2–0)	Burton Albion (PD)	
1989–90	VS Rugby (PD)	2–1 (2–0; 0–1)	Dartford (PD)	
1990–91	Chelmsford City (PD)	5–3 (2–1; 3–2)	Hythe Town (SD)	
1991–92	Dover Athletic (PD)	4–0 (1–0; 3–0)	Dorchester Town (PD)	
1992–93	Stourbridge (MD)	3–2 (2–0; 1–2)	Dover Athletic (PD)	
1993–94	Sudbury Town (SD)	5–1 (2–0; 3–1)	Gresley Rovers (PD)	
1994–95	Hastings Town (PD)	3–1 (1–0; 2–1)	Leek Town (PD)	
1995–96	Nuneaton Borough (MD)	5–2 (3–1; 2–1)	Baldock Town (PD)	
1996–97	Burton Albion (PD)	3–1 (2–1; 1–0)	Sudbury Town (PD)	
1997–98	Margate (SD)	3–1 (2–0; 0–1)	Redditch United (MD)	
1998–99	Sutton Coldfield Town (PD)	2–1 (0–0; 2–1)	Cambridge City (PD)	
1999–00	Burton Albion (PD)	6–1 (2–0; 4–1)	Hastings Town (ED)	
2000–01	Worcester City (PD)	4–1 (4–0; 0–1)	Crawley Town (PD)	
2001–02	Dorchester Town (ED)	4–0 (1–0; 3–0)	King's Lynn (PD)	
2002–03	Crawley Town (PD)	3–2 (1–2; 2–0)	Halesowen Town (PD)	
2003–04	Crawley Town (PD)	4–1 (2–1; 2–0)	Moor Green (PD)	
2004–05	King's Lynn (PD)	3–2 (2–2; 1–0)	Bedford Town (PD)	
2005–06	Hitchin Town (PD)	3–1 (1–0; 2–1)	Bromsgrove Rovers (WD)	
2006–07	Tiverton Town (PD)	3–2 (1–0; 2–2)	Hemel Hempstead Town (PD)	
2007–08	Hillingdon Borough (PD)	4–1 (1–1; 3–0)	Clevedon Town (D1SW)	
2008–09	Atherstone Town (D1M)	5–2 (2–1; 3–1)	Bridgwater Town (D1SW)	
2009–10	Cambridge City (PD)	1–1 (pens: 4–2) (1–0; 0–1(p:4-2))	VT (D1SW)	
2010–11	Hednesford Town (PD)	5–1 (2–1; 3–0)	Hemel Hempstead Town (PD)	
2011–12	Clevedon Town (D1SW)	2–1 (0–0; 2–1)	Banbury United (PD)	
2012–13	Arlesey Town (PD)	2–1 (1–0; 1–1(aet))	Frome Town (PD)	
2013–14	St Neots Town (PD)	1–0 (0–0; 1–0)	Tiverton Town (D1SW)	
2014–15	Poole Town (PD)	1–1 (away goals) (1–1; 0–0)	Corby Town (PD)	
2015–16	Merthyr Town (PD)	7–1 (5–1; 2–0)	Cambridge City (PD)	
2016–17	Hayes & Yeading United (PD)	1–1 (pens: 4–2) (single match)	St Ives Town (PD)	
2017–18	Hitchin Town (PD)	1–0 (single match)	Didcot Town (D1W)	
2018–19	Stratford Town (PDC)	1–0 (single match)	Cinderford Town (D1S)	
2019–20	Competition abandoned owing to COVID-19 pandemic			
2020–21	Competition abandoned owing to continuing COVID-19 pandemic			
2021–22	Royston Town (PDC)	7–0 (2–0; 5–0)	Taunton Town (PDS)	
2022 onwards	Competition discontinued			
Key to contents and abbreviations † Winners / runners-up: Club’s division indicated: D1 – Division One; D1M – Division One Midlands; D1N – Division One North; D1S – Division One South; D1SW – Division One South & West; D1W – Division One West; ED – Eastern Division; ES – Eastern Section; MD – Midland Division; NW-D – North West Division; PD – Premier Division; PDC – Premier Division Central; PDS – Premier Division South; SD – Southern Division; WD – Western Division; WS – Western Section; (where none indicated, the league operated a single division) ‡ Result: Bold Type – Final or Aggregate score: pens – Penalty shots result; Scores in bracket – Leg results (for aggregate score); aet – Result after extra time; r – Replay; p – Penalty shots result
