= 2011–12 Southern Football League =

The 2011–12 season was the 109th in the history of the Southern League, which is an English football competition featuring semi-professional and amateur clubs from the South West, South Central and Midlands of England and South Wales.

The league allocations were released on 20 May 2011. From this season onwards, the Southern League was known as The Evo-Stik League Southern, following a sponsorship deal with Evo-Stik.

== Premier Division ==
The Premier Division consisted of 22 clubs, including 15 clubs from the previous season and seven new clubs:

- Two clubs promoted from Division One Central:
  - Arlesey Town
  - Hitchin Town
- Two clubs promoted from Division One South & West:
  - A.F.C. Totton
  - Frome Town
- Plus:
  - Barwell, promoted from Northern Premier League Division One South
  - Redditch United, relegated from the Conference North
  - St Albans City, relegated from the Conference South

Brackley Town won the Southern League Premier Division and were promoted to the Conference North along with play-off winners Oxford City.

Evesham United, Swindon Supermarine and Cirencester Town finished in the relegation zone and, as in the previous season, all three relegating clubs were placed to the Division One South & West, while Hemel Hempstead Town were reprieved from relegation for the second time in three seasons due to Conference Premier clubs demotion.

=== League table ===
Southern Football League Premier Division
- Season: 2011–12
- Champions: Brackley Town
- Promoted: Brackley Town; Oxford City
- Relegated: Cirencester Town; Evesham United; Swindon Supermarine
- Matches: 462
- Goals: 1,316 (2.85 per match)
- Top goalscorer: Drew Roberts (Bedford Town) – 31
- Biggest home win: Brackley Town 7–1 Bedford Town, 20 August 2011; Oxford City 7–1 Swindon Supermarine, 8 October 2011
- Biggest away win: St Albans City 1–6 Barwell, 3 December 2011
- Highest scoring: Barwell 5–4 Brackley Town, 13 September 2011
- Highest attendance: 901 (Weymouth 3–1 A.F.C. Totton, 2 January 2012)
- Lowest attendance: 59 (Evesham United 1–3 Arlesey Town, 6 December 2011)
- Average attendance: 372

Pos	Team	Pld	W	D	L	GF	GA	GD	Pts	Promotion or relegation
1	Brackley Town	42	25	10	7	92	48	+44	85	Promoted to the Conference North
2	Oxford City	42	22	11	9	68	41	+27	77	Qualified for the play-offs, then promoted to the Conference North
3	AFC Totton	42	21	11	10	81	43	+38	74	Qualified for the play-offs
4	Chesham United	42	21	10	11	76	53	+23	73	Qualified for the play-offs
5	Cambridge City	42	21	9	12	78	52	+26	72	Qualified for the play-offs
6	Stourbridge	42	20	12	10	67	45	+22	72	
7	Leamington	42	18	15	9	60	47	+13	69	
8	St Albans City	42	17	11	14	72	77	−5	62	
9	Barwell	42	17	10	15	70	61	+9	61	
10	Bedford Town	42	15	10	17	60	69	−9	55	
11	Chippenham Town	42	14	11	17	55	53	+2	53	
12	Frome Town	42	12	16	14	44	49	−5	52	
13	Bashley	42	13	13	16	58	74	−16	52	
14	Hitchin Town	42	13	12	17	54	57	−3	51	
15	Redditch United	42	14	9	19	45	50	−5	51	
16	Banbury United	42	13	10	19	54	61	−7	49	
17	Weymouth	42	13	9	20	54	75	−21	48	
18	Arlesey Town	42	12	11	19	43	60	−17	47	
19	Hemel Hempstead Town	42	10	14	18	46	66	−20	44	Reprieved from relegation
20	Evesham United	42	12	8	22	49	71	−22	44	Relegated to Division One South & West
21	Swindon Supermarine	42	11	11	20	50	86	−36	44	Relegated to Division One South & West
22	Cirencester Town	42	7	9	26	40	78	−38	30	Relegated to Division One South & West

Source: fchd.com
Rules for classification: 1) points; 2) goal difference; 3) number of goals scored.

=== Play-offs ===
Semi-finals
2	Oxford City	1
5	Cambridge City	0
3	A.F.C. Totton	3
4	Chesham United	2

Final
2	Oxford City	4
3	A.F.C. Totton	2

Semi-finals

3 May 2012	Oxford City	1 – 0	Cambridge City	Court Place Farm, Marston
19:45	Willmott 72'			Attendance: 564

3 May 2012	AFC Totton	3 – 2	Chesham United	Testwood Stadium, Totton
19:45	Davies 13'; Charles 44'; Moss 60'		Watters 53'; Simon Thomas 56'	Attendance: 521

Final

7 May 2012	Oxford City	4 – 2	AFC Totton	Court Place Farm, Marston
15:00	Barcelos 39'; Basham 59' (pen.); Kynan 73'; Skendi 84'		Brown 50'; Osman 84'	Attendance: 1,280

=== Results ===
Home \ Away	TOT	ARL	BAN	BAR	BAS	BED	BRK	CAM	CHE	CHI	CIR	EVE	FRO	HEM	HIT	LEA	OXC	RED	SAC	STB	SWI	WEY
AFC Totton		6–0	2–1	2–1	2–0	2–0	2–2	2–3	3–0	1–1	3–0	3–1	1–1	2–0	0–1	1–1	6–0	0–0	1–1	1–0	4–0	2–0
Arlesey Town	0–2		2–1	1–2	0–2	1–0	2–0	0–1	2–4	1–1	0–1	1–0	0–1	3–0	0–0	0–2	1–4	0–3	1–1	1–1	1–1	3–1
Banbury United	0–1	1–2		3–0	4–0	1–2	0–2	2–0	1–2	1–1	2–1	1–2	2–2	0–0	1–1	1–1	1–1	1–0	2–0	4–1	1–1	1–5
Barwell	3–2	1–1	3–1		2–3	1–1	5–4	0–2	2–0	5–3	1–1	1–1	3–1	2–3	2–1	3–1	0–2	1–1	0–1	2–2	2–0	1–0
Bashley	4–4	0–0	0–3	0–2		3–3	1–1	0–1	3–1	0–0	2–3	0–0	1–1	2–0	1–3	2–1	0–2	2–1	4–1	1–0	3–3	3–3
Bedford Town	1–2	0–2	1–0	3–2	2–2		5–2	1–2	0–4	1–0	1–1	3–1	0–1	0–1	1–3	1–2	1–2	0–1	2–2	2–2	3–0	2–1
Brackley Town	0–3	2–1	1–1	2–1	3–2	7–1		4–2	3–2	5–1	0–0	2–0	1–1	3–0	3–0	3–0	5–2	2–0	6–0	0–2	4–0	3–1
Cambridge City	1–0	3–1	3–0	2–1	4–0	6–1	2–3		2–2	3–0	3–1	1–2	2–3	3–0	3–1	2–2	2–0	1–1	4–0	0–0	1–1	3–0
Chesham United	2–1	2–0	3–0	1–0	2–1	3–4	2–3	1–0		1–2	2–1	2–1	2–0	2–1	2–0	1–1	1–1	1–0	2–2	4–2	2–1	4–1
Chippenham Town	2–1	1–1	1–1	0–3	1–3	3–0	0–1	2–2	1–0		0–1	1–0	1–1	4–1	0–1	1–2	0–1	2–0	4–0	1–2	0–2	3–0
Cirencester Town	1–2	0–3	1–3	2–2	0–1	2–4	0–2	0–2	1–1	0–1		1–2	0–1	0–0	2–2	2–1	0–1	1–0	0–2	1–2	1–3	0–1
Evesham United	1–0	1–3	2–5	1–3	0–1	0–0	0–2	2–1	0–2	2–4	2–3		1–0	2–2	1–0	1–2	0–1	1–0	1–1	0–1	3–4	4–0
Frome Town	1–3	2–2	0–1	1–0	1–1	0–0	1–1	1–1	0–1	0–2	1–0	1–2		1–1	0–0	0–0	0–3	3–2	0–1	1–1	2–0	0–0
Hemel Hempstead Town	0–3	1–1	2–1	2–3	2–2	1–1	1–1	1–2	1–1	1–1	4–1	2–3	3–1		2–0	1–1	2–0	0–2	0–4	2–0	0–0	1–2
Hitchin Town	2–2	2–0	1–2	0–0	2–3	1–3	2–1	3–2	1–1	0–0	6–2	0–1	1–3	3–0		0–0	0–3	2–1	0–3	2–0	0–1	3–1
Leamington	2–1	1–0	3–1	3–0	1–0	0–4	0–0	4–2	3–2	0–0	2–0	1–1	1–1	3–1	1–0		1–1	1–2	1–0	4–2	2–2	4–1
Oxford City	2–2	3–0	0–1	2–0	3–0	1–0	1–1	0–0	2–0	2–1	0–0	2–0	2–0	1–1	0–0	2–1		1–1	3–1	1–2	7–1	2–0
Redditch United	0–0	0–1	1–0	2–0	2–2	2–0	2–3	2–0	1–1	1–0	0–2	3–1	0–4	1–0	1–4	1–1	1–1		3–4	0–1	0–1	2–0
St Albans City	3–4	2–2	1–1	1–6	2–0	1–2	1–1	3–0	1–1	1–4	4–1	4–1	2–1	2–1	4–4	2–1	3–2	2–0		2–1	2–1	2–2
Stourbridge	2–1	2–0	5–0	1–1	5–0	1–1	1–0	1–1	2–1	3–1	2–1	3–1	4–0	1–1	0–0	0–0	2–0	1–0	2–1		4–1	1–2
Swindon Supermarine	0–0	2–1	2–0	0–2	1–2	0–1	0–2	3–1	0–6	0–4	4–4	2–2	0–2	1–3	2–1	0–1	2–4	0–2	2–1	2–1		2–2
Weymouth	3–1	0–2	2–1	1–1	2–1	0–2	0–1	1–2	2–2	2–0	3–1	2–2	0–3	0–1	2–1	2–1	1–0	2–3	3–1	1–1	2–2	

Updated to match(es) played on 1 May 2012. Source: Southern Football League
Legend: Blue = home team win; Yellow = draw; Red = away team win.

=== Stadia and locations ===
Locations of the Premier Division clubs

Club	Stadium	Capacity
AFC Totton	Testwood Stadium	3,000
Arlesey Town	Hitchin Road	2,920
Banbury United	Spencer Stadium	2,000
Barwell	Kirkby Road	2,500
Bashley	Bashley Road	2,000
Bedford Town	The Eyrie	3,000
Brackley Town	St. James Park	3,500
Cambridge City	City Ground	2,300
Chesham United	The Meadow	5,000
Chippenham Town	Hardenhuish Park	2,815
Cirencester Town	Corinium Stadium	4,500
Evesham United	St George's Lane (groundshare with Worcester City)	3,000
Frome Town	Badgers Hill	2,000
Hemel Hempstead Town	Vauxhall Road	3,152
Hitchin Town	Top Field	4,000
Leamington	New Windmill Ground	3,000
Oxford City	Court Place Farm	2,000
Redditch United	The Valley	5,000
St Albans City	Clarence Park	5,007
Stourbridge	War Memorial Athletic Ground	2,626
Swindon Supermarine	Hunts Copse Ground	3,000
Weymouth	Bob Lucas Stadium	6,600

== Division One Central ==
Division One Central consisted of 22 clubs, including 18 clubs from previous season and four new clubs:

- Chalfont St Peter, promoted from the Spartan South Midlands League
- Chertsey Town, promoted from the Combined Counties League
- Fleet Town, transferred from Isthmian League Division One South
- St Neots Town, promoted from the United Counties League

St Neots Town won the division in their inaugural season in the Southern League and were promoted to Premier Division along with play-off winners Bedworth United. Marlow finished bottom of the table and were relegated to the Hellenic League, while second bottom Fleet Town were reprieved from relegation due to Bedfont Town's resignation.

=== League table ===
Southern Football League Division One Central
- Season: 2011–12
- Champions: St Neots Town
- Promoted: St Neots Town; Bedworth United
- Relegated: Marlow
- Matches: 462
- Goals: 1,433 (3.1 per match)
- Top goalscorer: Stefan Moore (St Neots Town) – 31
- Biggest home win: St Neots Town 8–0 North Greenford United, 21 April 2012
- Biggest away win: Northwood 1–5 Chalfont St Peter, 16 August 2011 Rugby Town 0–4 Ashford Town, 12 November 2011; Chertsey Town 1–5 Barton Rovers, 13 December 2011 Chalfont St Peter 1–5 St Neots Town, 31 December 2011
- Highest scoring: Ashford Town 5–4 Chertsey Town, 23 August 2011; Chertsey Town 5–4 Uxbridge, 27 August 2011
- Highest attendance: 1060 (St Neots Town 0–1 Slough Town, 10 March 2012)
- Lowest attendance: 36 (Bedfont Town 3–0 Daventry Town, 14 April 2012)
- Average attendance: 141

Pos	Team	Pld	W	D	L	GF	GA	GD	Pts	Promotion or relegation
1	St Neots Town	42	29	6	7	115	36	+79	93	Promoted to the Premier Division
2	Slough Town	42	26	9	7	74	42	+32	87	Qualified for the play-offs
3	Bedworth United	42	23	9	10	90	57	+33	78	Qualified for the play-offs, then promoted to the Premier Division
4	Uxbridge	42	22	8	12	79	59	+20	74	Qualified for the play-offs
5	Beaconsfield SYCOB	42	20	9	13	65	55	+10	69	Qualified for the play-offs
6	Rugby Town	42	19	10	13	67	65	+2	67	
7	Northwood	42	19	9	14	74	62	+12	66	
8	Biggleswade Town	42	19	7	16	75	54	+21	64	
9	Ashford Town	42	16	11	15	62	61	+1	59	
10	A.F.C. Hayes	42	14	16	12	58	59	−1	58	
11	Barton Rovers	42	16	8	18	64	63	+1	56	
12	Chalfont St Peter	42	14	14	14	65	68	−3	56	
13	Leighton Town	42	15	10	17	60	67	−7	55	
14	Bedfont Town	42	15	9	18	53	64	−11	54	Resigned at the end of the season
15	Burnham	42	13	13	16	64	67	−3	52	
16	Daventry Town	42	15	5	22	52	72	−20	50	
17	Chertsey Town	42	15	5	22	65	93	−28	50	
18	North Greenford United	42	13	10	19	56	72	−16	49	
19	Woodford United	42	12	8	22	56	70	−14	44	
20	Aylesbury	42	12	8	22	50	82	−32	44	
21	Fleet Town	42	8	8	26	43	83	−40	32	Reprieved from relegation
22	Marlow	42	6	10	26	50	86	−36	28	Relegated to the Hellenic League

Source: fchd.com
Rules for classification: 1) points; 2) goal difference; 3) number of goals scored.

=== Play-offs ===
Semi-finals
2	Slough Town	1
5	Beaconsfield SYCOB	2
3	Bedworth United	2
4	Uxbridge	1

Final
3	Bedworth United	3
5	Beaconsfield SYCOB	1

Semi-finals

3 May 2012	Slough Town	1 – 2 a.e.t.	Beaconsfield SYCOB	Holloways Park, Beaconsfield
19:45	Edgeworth 103'		Saroya 110' (pen.); Barney 114'	Attendance: 370

1 May 2012	Bedworth United	2 – 1	Uxbridge	The Oval, Bedworth
19:45	Bellingham 75', 85'		Murray 13' (pen.)	Attendance: 451

Final

7 May 2012	Bedworth United	3 – 1	Beaconsfield SYCOB	The Oval, Bedworth
15:00	Robinson 19'; Piggon 58'; Spencer 89'		Osubu 23'	Attendance: 830

=== Results ===
Home \ Away	HAY	ASH	AYB	BAR	BEA	BFT	BWU	BIG	BUR	CHA	CHE	DAV	FLE	LEI	MAR	NGU	NOR	RUG	SLO	STN	UXB	WFU
A.F.C. Hayes		1–2	3–3	1–1	1–2	0–1	2–4	1–1	2–2	2–2	0–3	1–1	2–1	0–1	2–1	2–1	1–4	2–2	1–1	0–3	2–1	1–2
Ashford Town	0–0		4–1	0–2	1–1	1–2	2–2	0–2	1–1	0–0	5–4	1–2	3–1	1–0	0–0	0–0	3–2	1–0	1–2	0–2	0–0	0–2
Aylesbury	2–0	2–1		0–3	1–3	2–1	2–4	0–1	3–4	2–2	1–1	2–1	2–1	2–2	0–3	0–1	1–0	0–3	2–0	0–2	0–1	1–0
Barton Rovers	0–2	2–4	1–1		1–1	0–1	1–0	0–2	4–2	4–0	0–1	1–0	4–1	2–2	2–1	2–1	1–0	1–1	0–3	0–1	1–2	2–1
Beaconsfield Town	0–1	0–1	4–2	3–1		1–0	1–1	0–0	3–2	3–0	4–2	1–2	2–1	3–0	0–1	1–2	1–3	0–0	0–2	0–2	1–1	1–0
Bedfont Town	1–3	1–0	1–0	0–1	0–2		0–4	1–3	0–0	2–3	2–2	3–0	0–1	2–1	2–2	1–1	1–0	3–1	1–2	1–0	1–4	1–1
Bedworth United	2–1	4–2	3–1	4–1	4–0	2–2		3–1	1–1	0–2	1–1	3–1	3–1	4–1	3–2	2–0	1–3	4–1	5–3	0–3	1–4	2–1
Biggleswade Town	3–0	4–1	4–1	1–1	4–0	1–2	2–4		1–1	2–1	2–3	4–0	0–0	3–2	2–0	4–0	1–3	0–1	1–1	1–3	2–4	3–1
Burnham	1–1	1–1	1–0	3–4	1–2	0–0	0–0	2–4		1–3	4–2	3–0	3–1	5–1	0–0	2–0	1–2	0–2	1–1	0–3	1–3	2–1
Chalfont St Peter	0–1	2–1	1–1	1–0	3–0	2–3	0–3	1–1	0–1		1–2	2–2	2–2	1–1	4–3	1–2	3–3	0–2	2–1	1–5	0–1	1–1
Chertsey Town	1–1	1–2	3–2	1–5	0–3	0–2	1–0	3–2	0–2	0–0		1–4	0–2	5–1	2–1	2–0	2–1	0–1	3–5	0–2	5–4	0–3
Daventry Town	0–2	4–3	3–0	3–4	1–3	0–2	0–2	1–0	2–1	1–1	2–4		2–1	3–1	3–1	1–0	0–1	1–0	1–1	0–3	0–2	2–1
Fleet Town	3–3	0–1	3–1	1–0	1–4	0–3	2–1	1–0	1–0	1–2	0–3	1–3		1–2	1–1	1–0	1–4	1–1	0–1	0–1	2–4	0–3
Leighton Town	1–1	2–3	0–1	1–0	0–0	2–1	0–0	1–0	3–1	1–3	3–1	1–0	3–1		2–0	1–1	5–2	1–2	0–1	1–1	4–0	4–4
Marlow	2–2	0–1	0–1	2–1	1–2	4–3	1–3	1–3	0–2	1–4	2–1	0–0	3–3	0–1		2–4	4–2	3–5	0–3	0–0	2–2	1–2
North Greenford United	1–1	1–1	3–2	0–3	1–3	5–2	2–1	0–3	2–1	2–3	1–2	1–2	2–1	2–0	1–1		2–3	4–0	0–0	2–2	0–1	2–3
Northwood	1–2	2–1	1–1	2–1	1–1	1–0	3–3	3–0	2–1	1–5	4–0	1–0	0–0	2–1	3–2	1–1		3–3	2–4	4–1	1–2	0–1
Rugby Town	1–4	0–4	0–2	1–1	1–2	1–1	1–0	3–2	4–1	2–1	1–0	2–0	3–3	3–0	1–0	4–2	0–0		2–0	2–4	4–0	3–3
Slough Town	1–1	4–3	0–0	2–1	1–1	2–1	2–1	2–1	1–2	1–1	3–0	2–1	3–0	0–3	3–0	0–2	1–0	4–0		2–0	2–0	2–1
St Neots Town	0–1	1–1	9–2	5–3	4–2	3–0	1–2	1–2	3–3	4–1	7–0	2–0	4–1	4–0	6–0	8–0	3–0	5–1	0–1		0–0	3–0
Uxbridge	0–1	1–2	3–0	4–1	2–3	5–1	1–1	1–0	1–1	0–0	5–2	5–2	3–0	1–1	2–1	1–3	0–3	2–1	0–2	1–2		2–1
Woodford United	0–3	2–3	1–3	1–1	2–1	1–1	1–2	0–2	2–3	2–3	2–1	2–1	1–0	0–3	2–1	1–1	0–0	0–1	1–2	1–2	2–3	

Updated to match(es) played on 5 May 2012. Source: Southern Football League
Legend: Blue = home team win; Yellow = draw; Red = away team win.

=== Stadia and locations ===
Locations of Division One Central clubs
Greater London Division One Central Clubs

Club	Stadium	Capacity
A.F.C. Hayes	Farm Park	1,500
Ashford Town	The Robert Parker Stadium	2,550
Aylesbury	Haywood Way	1,300
Barton Rovers	Sharpenhoe Road	4,000
Beaconsfield SYCOB	Holloways Park	3,500
Bedfont Town	The Orchard	2,100
Bedworth United	The Oval	3,000
Biggleswade Town	The Carlsberg Stadium	3,000
Burnham	The Gore	2,500
Chalfont St Peter	Mill Meadow	1,500
Chertsey Town	Alwyns Lane	2,500
Daventry Town	Communications Park	5,000
Fleet Town	Calthorpe Park	2,000
Leighton Town	Bell Close	2,800
Marlow	Alfred Davis Memorial Ground	3,000
North Greenford United	Berkeley Fields	2,000
Northwood	Northwood Park	3,075
Rugby Town	Butlin Road	6,000
Slough Town	Holloways Park (groundshare with Beaconsfield SYCOB)	3,500
St Neots Town	New Rowley Park	3,500
Uxbridge	Honeycroft	3,770
Woodford United	Byfield Road	3,000

== Division One South & West ==
Shortly before the start of the season Andover resigned from the league and folded. No replacement club was admitted and the season was played with 21 clubs. Therefore, relegation zone was reduced to one place in order to make up the numbers for the 2012–13 season.

Division One South & West consisted of 21 clubs, including 17 clubs from previous season and four new clubs:

- Three clubs relegated from the Premier Division:
  - Didcot Town
  - Halesowen Town
  - Tiverton Town
- Plus:
  - Poole Town, promoted as champions of the Wessex League

Bideford won the division and were promoted to the Premier Division along with play-off winners Gosport Borough. Stourport Swifts finished bottom of the table and were relegated.

=== League table ===
Southern Football League Division One South & West
- Season: 2011–12
- Champions: Bideford
- Promoted: Bideford; Gosport Borough
- Relegated: Stourport Swifts
- Matches: 420
- Goals: 1,189 (2.83 per match)
- Top goalscorer: Justin Bennett (Gosport Borough) – 31
- Biggest home win: Paulton Rovers 7–0 Wimborne Town, 10 September 2011
- Biggest away win: Didcot Town 0–5 North Leigh, 13 September 2011
- Highest scoring: Wimborne Town 5–4 Halesowen Town, 24 September 2011; Hungerford Town 3–6 North Leigh, 28 April 2012
- Highest attendance: 792 (Poole Town 3–1 Wimborne Town, 9 April 2012)
- Lowest attendance: 47 (North Leigh 1–2 Bishop's Cleeve, 17 December 2011)
- Average attendance: 164

Pos	Team	Pld	W	D	L	GF	GA	GD	Pts	Promotion or relegation
1	Bideford	40	28	8	4	77	41	+36	92	Promoted to the Premier Division
2	Poole Town	40	25	6	9	78	39	+39	81	Qualified for the play-offs
3	Gosport Borough	40	22	14	4	73	44	+29	80	Qualified for the play-offs, then promoted to the Premier Division
4	Sholing	40	22	8	10	71	43	+28	74	Qualified for the play-offs
5	Hungerford Town	40	21	8	11	65	44	+21	71	Qualified for the play-offs
6	North Leigh	40	21	5	14	90	63	+27	68	
7	Paulton Rovers	40	18	10	12	60	39	+21	64	
8	Thatcham Town	40	16	14	10	51	42	+9	62	Transferred to the Division One Central
9	Tiverton Town	40	16	11	13	52	42	+10	59	
10	Cinderford Town	40	17	8	15	49	39	+10	59	
11	Bishop's Cleeve	40	16	11	13	40	42	−2	59	
12	Halesowen Town	40	15	6	19	55	56	−1	51	Transferred to NPL Division One South
13	Yate Town	40	13	11	16	58	59	−1	50	
14	Mangotsfield United	40	14	7	19	62	66	−4	49	
15	Bridgwater Town	40	13	4	23	47	77	−30	43	
16	Didcot Town	40	11	9	20	39	68	−29	42	
17	Taunton Town	40	10	10	20	47	76	−29	40	
18	Abingdon United	40	9	10	21	35	69	−34	37	
19	Wimborne Town	40	8	11	21	50	77	−27	35	
20	Clevedon Town	40	9	6	25	51	75	−24	33	
21	Stourport Swifts	40	5	5	30	39	88	−49	20	Relegated to the Midland Football Alliance
22	Andover	0	0	0	0	0	0	0	0	Resigned from the league and folded (Note: Andover resigned from the league and were wound up in July 2011.)

Source: fchd.com
Rules for classification: 1) points; 2) goal difference; 3) number of goals scored.

=== Play-offs ===
Semi-finals
2	Poole Town	2
5	Hungerford Town	1
3	Gosport Borough	1
4	Sholing	0

Final
2	Poole Town	1
3	Gosport Borough	3^{*}

^{*}AET

Semi-finals

1 May 2012	Poole Town	2 – 1	Hungerford Town	Tatnam, Poole
19:45	Preston 24'; Devlin 41' (pen.)		Hopper 47'	Attendance: 759

30 April 2012	Gosport Borough	1 – 0	Sholing	Privett Park, Gosport
19:45	Bennett 62'			Attendance: 332

Final

7 May 2012	Poole Town	1 – 3 a.e.t.	Gosport Borough	Tatnam, Poole
15:00	Brookes 35'		Claridge 90+1', 98'; Bennett 93'	Attendance: 1,716

=== Results ===
Home \ Away	ABI	BID	BIS	BRI	CIN	CLE	DID	GOS	HAL	HUN	MAN	NOR	PAU	POO	SHO	SPS	TAU	THA	TIV	WIM	YAT
Abingdon United		0–0	0–0	2–0	0–0	0–4	3–0	0–2	1–3	0–2	1–0	1–3	1–1	1–3	2–1	3–2	2–0	0–2	0–2	0–1	0–2
Bideford	1–0		2–1	4–0	4–0	3–1	2–1	2–2	2–0	1–0	2–1	3–2	0–0	2–2	3–2	1–0	1–0	1–0	1–1	3–1	2–2
Bishop's Cleeve	0–0	0–1		0–0	0–0	2–0	0–1	1–1	0–1	1–0	2–1	2–1	1–0	0–1	0–3	0–1	2–1	0–0	1–1	1–0	1–0
Bridgwater Town	1–1	2–4	1–2		0–0	2–1	3–2	0–1	0–1	0–1	1–3	1–3	3–1	1–2	0–3	2–1	1–2	1–3	2–0	4–3	2–1
Cinderford Town	1–2	0–1	1–2	1–1		2–1	1–0	2–2	1–0	0–1	3–0	1–2	1–2	1–2	0–1	6–0	2–0	0–1	2–3	0–3	0–0
Clevedon Town	3–0	1–2	0–3	1–3	0–2		0–2	1–5	3–2	0–1	3–2	0–3	0–2	1–0	0–1	3–2	4–0	1–2	0–0	1–1	4–2
Didcot Town	2–3	1–1	0–1	1–0	0–0	1–0		0–4	0–2	0–1	1–0	0–5	1–0	2–5	0–4	1–0	5–1	0–3	0–2	2–2	1–1
Gosport Borough	3–0	2–1	2–1	2–1	0–2	1–1	1–1		2–1	0–0	2–1	3–3	2–0	2–1	1–0	4–3	2–0	1–0	1–1	5–3	4–1
Halesowen Town	2–0	3–1	1–1	3–1	0–1	2–1	1–0	1–3		1–3	0–1	1–0	1–2	0–0	1–2	4–1	0–1	3–0	1–2	3–0	0–2
Hungerford Town	4–0	1–2	4–0	3–0	2–1	1–1	2–1	1–2	2–0		1–3	3–6	1–0	0–2	4–1	0–0	1–1	2–1	1–0	3–0	3–1
Mangotsfield United	3–2	1–3	0–0	4–1	1–3	3–2	1–1	1–1	2–3	1–0		2–3	3–2	2–1	0–0	6–2	4–0	1–2	2–2	2–1	0–2
North Leigh	5–0	1–2	1–2	2–3	1–2	3–0	3–3	2–1	4–2	3–1	1–3		1–3	1–2	2–3	1–0	4–2	4–0	2–0	2–1	1–4
Paulton Rovers	1–1	1–2	0–2	3–1	0–1	2–0	3–1	0–0	1–1	3–3	3–2	2–1		1–2	0–0	2–0	2–0	4–0	2–1	7–0	3–2
Poole Town	2–1	3–1	4–1	0–1	3–1	5–3	3–0	3–0	1–0	0–1	4–1	3–1	0–1		0–0	3–1	6–0	2–3	0–0	3–1	1–1
Sholing	6–1	3–1	3–2	1–2	1–1	3–1	4–0	1–2	2–3	3–3	2–1	0–1	0–2	3–2		2–0	2–1	2–2	3–1	1–0	1–2
Stourport Swifts	4–3	0–3	0–1	2–0	1–3	0–2	0–1	0–1	1–1	3–4	2–1	2–2	0–2	0–2	0–1		0–1	1–2	1–2	2–1	0–3
Taunton Town	1–1	2–3	3–3	6–2	0–1	1–1	1–0	2–2	3–1	1–0	1–1	3–3	1–0	1–2	0–1	4–4		1–1	0–2	2–0	2–3
Thatcham Town	1–0	1–2	3–1	4–0	1–2	3–2	1–1	0–0	0–0	1–1	0–0	0–1	0–0	0–0	1–1	3–0	2–0		1–1	3–2	1–0
Tiverton Town	0–0	0–1	2–0	2–1	1–0	2–1	0–1	3–1	4–2	1–2	5–0	1–4	1–1	0–1	0–1	1–0	0–1	1–1		1–1	3–0
Wimborne Town	1–3	0–3	1–1	0–1	0–2	3–3	1–1	2–2	5–4	2–1	1–0	1–1	1–1	0–1	0–2	4–1	1–1	0–0	2–1		0–2
Yate Town	0–0	3–3	1–2	1–2	0–2	1–0	3–4	1–1	0–0	1–1	0–2	0–1	1–0	3–1	1–1	2–2	4–0	3–2	1–2	1–4	

Updated to match(es) played on 28 April 2012. Source: Southern Football League
Legend: Blue = home team win; Yellow = draw; Red = away team win.

=== Stadia and locations ===
Locations of Division One South & West clubs

Club	Stadium	Capacity
Abingdon United	Northcourt Road	2,000
Bideford	The Sports Ground	2,000
Bishops Cleeve	Kayte Lane	1,500
Bridgwater Town	Fairfax Park	2,500
Cinderford Town	Causeway Ground	3,500
Clevedon Town	Hand Stadium	3,500
Didcot Town	Draycott Engineering Loop Meadow Stadium	3,000
Gosport Borough	Privett Park	4,500
Halesowen Town	The Grove	5,000
Hungerford Town	Bulpit Lane	2,500
Mangotsfield United	Cossham Street	2,500
North Leigh	Eynsham Hall Park Sports Ground	2,000
Paulton Rovers	Athletic Field	2,500
Poole Town	Tatnam Ground	2,500
Sholing	Universal Stadium	1,000
Stourport Swifts	Walshes Meadow	2,000
Taunton Town	Wordsworth Drive	2,500
Thatcham Town	Waterside Park	1,500
Tiverton Town	Ladysmead	3,500
Wimborne Town	The Cuthbury	3,250
Yate Town	Lodge Road	2,000

== League Cup ==
2011–12 Southern League Cup
Tournament details
- Country: England
- Teams: 65

Final positions
- Champions: Clevedon Town
- Runners-up: Banbury United

The Southern League Cup 2011–12 (billed as the RedInsure Cup 2011–12 for sponsorship reasons) is the 74th season of the Southern League Cup, the cup competition of the Southern Football League.

=== Preliminary round ===
27 September 2011	Stourbridge	2–1	Evesham United
	Drake 69'; Griffin 75'	Report	Jones 57'	Attendance: 208

27 September 2011	Weymouth	0–1	Sholing
		Report	Byron Mason 36'	Attendance: 127

=== First round ===
17 September 2011	Bishop's Cleeve	0–2	Paulton Rovers
		Report	Stone 48'; Price 66'	Attendance: 67

1 October 2011	Bedford Town	3–1	St Neots Town
	Roberts 22'; Faulkner 62'; Cole 90'	Report	Moore 13'	Attendance: 310

22 October 2011	Cinderford Town	1–2	Clevedon Town
	Egan 87'	Report	Mills 45', 90+1'	Attendance: 52

1 November 2011	Abingdon United	0–1	Oxford City
		Report	Banjamin 70'	Attendance: 149

1 November 2011	A.F.C. Hayes	1–6	Chertsey Town
	Smith 26'	Report	Smith 17', 45', 48', 83'; Page 38'; Bennett 83'	Attendance: 48

1 November 2011	A.F.C. Totton	3–2 (a.e.t.)	Gosport Borough
	Jack 50'; Brown 90+2'; McKie 98'		Molyneaux 17'; Wooden 75'	Attendance: 186

1 November 2011	Aylesbury	1–2	North Leigh
	Welch 59'		Hole 3'; Mills 21'	Attendance: 69

1 November 2011	Banbury United	4–0	Bedworth United
	Cole 8'; Woodley 39', 64'; Walker 90+1'			Attendance: 90

1 November 2011	Barton Rovers	1–1 (a.e.t.) (7–6 p)	Arlesey Town
	Bully 101'		Allinson 117'	Attendance: 100

1 November 2011	Bideford	2–1	Tiverton Town
	Hockley 40' (pen.); Wood 89'		Emati-Emati 35'	Attendance: 169

1 November 2011	Bridgwater Town	3–4	Taunton Town
	Cornwall 41' (pen.); Merceica 48'; Barnes 86'		Blake 17'; Rice 32'; Redrup 80'; Ellis 90+1'	Attendance: 179

1 November 2011	Daventry Town	3–1 (a.e.t.)	Barwell
	Hicks 36'; Hoban 103'; O'Grady 110'	Report	Charley 17'	Attendance: 93

1 November 2011	Fleet Town	1–5	Uxbridge
	Wynter 37'		Farrell 39'; Tomkins 53' (pen.), 89'; Yarney 67'; Capewell 71'	Attendance: 52

1 November 2011	Leighton Town	4–1	Cambridge City
	Maltay 48'; McBride 73'; Ojuroye 74'; Hatch 75'		Clift 5'	Attendance: 95

1 November 2011	Marlow	0–2	Bedfont Town
			Stanislaus 57'; Pinnock 73'	Attendance: 58

1 November 2011	North Greenford United	3–0	Burnham
	Joseph 25', 88'; Paine 30'			Attendance: 34

1 November 2011	Northwood	3–0	Ashford Town
	Hawkins 40'; Senior 62'; Burrell 79'			Attendance: 61

1 November 2011	Redditch United	1–0	Halesowen Town
	Halsall 72'			Attendance: 132

1 November 2011	Slough Town	1–2	Chesham United
	Woosley 54'		Woosley 6' (o.g.); Thomas 57' (pen.)	Attendance: 137

1 November 2011	Stourbridge	5–2	Stourport Swifts
	Griffin 8', 21', 31', 76'; Evans 60'		Emery 11' (pen.); Pitt 79'	Attendance: 198

1 November 2011	Woodford United	1–2	Rugby Town
	Taylor 21'		Steane 59'; Fagan 75'	Attendance: 35

1 November 2011	Yate Town	6–1	Mangotsfield United
	Vahid 6'; Groves 9'; Church 20'; Fergusson 44'; Stone 68' (pen.); Plummer 88'		Rendell 64'	Attendance: 156

2 November 2011	Frome Town	4–1	Cirencester Town
	Hulbert 13', 30', 87'; Davidson 70'		Tambling 90'	Attendance: 72

2 November 2011	Swindon Supermarine	2–0	Chippenham Town
	Edenborough 2', 74'			Attendance: 96

2 November 2011	Thatcham Town	1–0	Didcot Town
	Johnson 15'			Attendance: 63

7 November 2011	Hitchin Town	5–4 (a.e.t.)	Biggleswade Town
	Lewis 37'; Lee 47'; Arlick 105'; Cole 112'; Frendo 119'		Fuller 56', 78'; Lockhead 109'; Gentle 115'	Attendance: 103

8 November 2011	Bashley	2–5	Poole Town
	Rowley 50'; Stokoe 72'	Report	Richardson 25'; Spetch 31'; Cook 45'; Herbert 78'; Smith 85'	Attendance: 165

8 November 2011	Chalfont St Peter	1–1 (a.e.t.) (3–4 p)	Beaconsfield SYCOB
	Sheehan 25'		Barney 45'	Attendance: 47
Note: Match was originally due to be played on 1 November, but was abandoned after 40 minutes due to a floodlight failure.

8 November 2011	Leamington	2–2 (a.e.t.) (3–5 p)	Brackley Town
	Blyth 75'; Charlton 90+1'		Louis 57'; Kemp 82'	Attendance: 204

8 November 2011	St Albans City	0–3	Hemel Hempstead Town
			Williams 8'; Pearce 82'; Blake 88'	Attendance: 106

9 November 2011	Sholing	2–3	Wimborne Town
	Wort 39', 53'		Kemble 17'; Cream 58'; Wignell 88'	Attendance: 94

=== Second round ===
21 November 2011	Beaconsfield SYCOB	1–0	Bedfont Town
	Oshitola 30'			Attendance: 40

21 November 2011	Hitchin Town	1–2	Hemel Hempstead Town
	Burke 4'		Wright 32'; Beale 72'	Attendance: 100

22 November 2011	A.F.C. Totton	1–0	Poole Town
	Coutts 73'			Attendance: 809

22 November 2011	Bideford	4–3 (a.e.t.)	Taunton Town
	Sawyer 15'; Spear 55'; Herrod 70'; Mudge 100'		Plant 50'; Rice 60'; McNab 75' (pen.)	Attendance: 115

22 November 2011	Clevedon Town	2–1	Paulton Rovers
	Kington 10'; Hemmings 47'		Taylor 30'	Attendance: 75

22 November 2011	Hungerford Town	1–2	Daventry Town
	Day 5'		Bellingham 6'; O'Grady 74'	Attendance: 40

22 November 2011	North Greenford United	1–1 (a.e.t.) (4–2 p)	Chertsey Town
	Joseph 78'		Powell 12'	Attendance: 52

22 November 2011	Northwood	3–1	Uxbridge
	Alexander 21'; Senior 88'; Morlese 90+2'		Warsame 68'	Attendance: 65

22 November 2011	Wimborne Town	2–3 (a.e.t.)	Thatcham Town
	Kemble 5'; Cole 83'		Self 25'; Clark 45', 114'	Attendance: 112

22 November 2011	Yate Town	2–6	Frome Town
	Reaney 22' (o.g.); Plummer 78'		Evans 10', 41'; Balinger 44', 55'; Bennett 86'; Hulbert 89'	Attendance: 80

23 November 2011	Swindon Supermarine	3–2	Brackley Town
	Wood 67'; Edenborough 74'; Etheridge 90'		Magunba 34'; Diggin 77'	Attendance: 58

29 November 2011	Chesham United	3–1	Barton Rovers
	Archer 28', 80'; Lambert 63' (pen.)		Case 27'	Attendance: 91

29 November 2011	Leighton Town	0–1 (a.e.t.)	Bedford Town
			Hatch 91'	Attendance: 88

29 November 2011	Oxford City	1–0	North Leigh
	Ballard 30'			Attendance: 103

29 November 2011	Rugby Town	4–3	Stourbridge
	Gaskin 41'; Keen 67', 90'; Preston 89'		Ward 16'; Griffin 31', 57'	Attendance: 131

6 December 2011	Redditch United	0–2	Banbury United
			Polk 29'; Johnson 75'	Attendance: 81

=== Third round ===
9 January 2012	Beaconsfield SYCOB	1–3	Hemel Hempstead Town
19:45	Osubu 64'		Gorman 5'; Pearce 83'; Gambin 86'	Attendance: 62

10 January 2012	A.F.C. Totton	3–0	Swindon Supermarine
19:45	Brown 38', 48'; Osman 51'			Attendance: 237

10 January 2012	Bedford Town	2–3 (a.e.t.)	North Greenford United
19:45	Roberts 41', 50' (pen.)		Yorke 61' (o.g.); Joseph 90+2', 120+2'	Attendance: 127

10 January 2012	Bideford	2–3	Clevedon Town
19:45	Cayford 35'; Downing 65'		Edwards-Samuels 25'; Muggeridge 37', 76'	Attendance: 121

10 January 2012	Chesham United	6–0	Northwood
19:45	Wales 17', 24'; Archer 50', 59'; Potton 66'; Wadkins 76'			Attendance: 120

10 January 2012	Oxford City	2–3 (a.e.t.)	Banbury United
19:45	Bell 15'; Barcellos 83'		Williams 42' (pen.); Edmonds 44'; Johnson 109' (pen.)	Attendance: 112

11 January 2012	Thatcham Town	2–1	Frome Town
19:45	Clarke 70'; Flegg 81'		Ballinger 50'	Attendance: 61

24 January 2012	Rugby Town	2–1	Daventry Town
19:45	Palmer 34'; Booth 37'		Hendry 26'	Attendance: 147
Note: Match was due to be played on 10 January, but was abandoned after 68 minutes because of a floodlight failure. The rearranged fixture on 17 January was postponed.

=== Quarter-finals ===
14 February 2012	A.F.C. Totton	6–1	North Greenford United
19:45	Moss 15', 59', 72'; Sherborne 27'; Gosney 78', 90' (pen.)		Pither 25'	Attendance: 198
Note: Match was due to be played on 7 February, but was postponed.

15 February 2012	Thatcham Town	1–4 (a.e.t.)	Clevedon Town
19:45	Davis 22'		Moss 28', 100'; Fisher 119'; Best 120'	Attendance: 65
Note: Match was due to be played on 8 February, but was postponed.

21 February 2012	Chesham United	2–1	Rugby Town
19:45	Watters 5'; Archer 65'		Keen 11'	Attendance: 126
Note: Match was due to be played on 7 February, but was postponed. It was postponed again on 14 February.

21 February 2012	Hemel Hempstead Town	0–2	Banbury United
19:45			Williams 50'; Angus 53'	Attendance: 95

=== Semi-finals ===
6 March 2012	A.F.C. Totton	2–3	Clevedon Town
19:45	Gosney 84' (pen.); Sherborne 90+1'		Hemmings 8', 79'; Best 38'	Attendance: 211

21 February 2012	Banbury United	0–0 (a.e.t.) (5–4 p)	Chesham United
19:45				Attendance: 131

=== Final ===
27 March 2012	Clevedon Town	0–0	Banbury United
19:45				Attendance: 186

17 April 2012	Banbury United	1–2	Clevedon Town
19:45	Cole 23'		Muggeridge 11'; Hemmings 75'	Attendance: 405

== See also ==
- Southern Football League
- 2011–12 Isthmian League
- 2011–12 Northern Premier League
