= Bedworth United F.C. =

Association football club in Bedworth, England

Coordinates: 52°28′35.602″N 1°28′16.838″W

Bedworth United
- Full name: Bedworth United Football Club
- Nickname: The Greenbacks
- Founded: 1895
- Ground: The Oval, Bedworth
- Capacity: 2,900
- Manager: Andrew Penny & Jamie Lenton
- League: Northern Premier League Division One Midlands
- 2025–26: Northern Premier League Division One Midlands, 18th of 22
- Website: bedworthunitedfc.co.uk
Home colours	Away colours

Bedworth United Football Club is a football club based in Bedworth, Warwickshire, England. They are currently members of the Northern Premier League Division One Midlands and play at the Oval.

== History ==
The first club from which the modern Bedworth United traces its lineage was Bedworth Town, established in 1895. In 1898 they were founder members of the Nuneaton & District League, but had folded by 1900. The name Bedworth Town was resurrected in 1905 when Bedworth Evening Combination School of the Coventry & North Warwickshire League changed their name. However, they folded in the early 1920s. The name was restored to use again in 1925 when Collycroft United (founded 1916 and also members of the Coventry & North Warwickshire League, were renamed. In 1936 they joined the Central Amateur League, but played in the league for only one season.

Following World War II, a new Bedworth Town club was established in 1947. They joined the Birmingham Combination, finishing third in their first season, before winning back-to-back titles in 1948–49 and 1949–50. In 1954 the club moved up to the Northern Division of the Birmingham & District League, and were placed in Division One the following season after league reorganisation. In 1962 the league was renamed the West Midlands (Regional) League. After several seasons struggling in the league, finishing bottom in 1959–60 and then finishing in the bottom five every season between 1962–63 and 1967–68, the club folded in 1968. However, a replacement club was formed under the name Bedworth United, which took over from Town in the West Midlands (Regional) League.

In 1972 Bedworth moved up to Division One North of the Southern League, where they remained until league restructuring in 1979 saw them placed in the Midland Division. A sixth-place finish in 1981–82 was enough to earn a place in the new Premier Division in 1982. In 1988–89 they finished bottom of the division and were relegated to Division One Midlands, which became the Western Division in 1999. In 2006 they were transferred to Division One Midlands, which became Division One Central in 2010.

A third-place finish in 2011–12 saw Bedworth qualify for the promotion play-offs. After beating Uxbridge 2–1 in the semi-final, they defeated Beaconsfield SYCOB 3–1 in the final to earn promotion to the Premier Division. However, the following season saw them finish second-bottom of the table, resulting in relegation, this time to Division One South of the Northern Premier League. They were transferred back to Division One Central of the Southern League in 2014, and qualified for the play-offs again in 2014–15 after finishing fourth. A 2–1 win over Aylesbury in the semi-finals and then a 2–0 victory against Barton Rovers in the final saw them promoted back to the Southern League's Premier Division. However, the following season saw them relegated again, again to Division One South of the Northern Premier League.

Bedworth finished fourth in Division One South in 2017–18, qualifying for the play-offs. After beating Chasetown 2–1 in the semi-finals, they defeated Stamford 2–1 after extra time in the final to earn promotion to the Southern League Premier South Division. However, the club finished bottom of the Premier South Division the following season and were relegated to Division One Central. At the end of the 2020–21 season they were transferred to Division One Midlands of the Northern Premier League.

== Ground ==
Between 1911 and 1939 the club played at the British Queen Ground, after which they moved to the Oval on Coventry Road. It has a capacity of 2,900,

== Honours ==
- Birmingham Combination
  - Champions 1948–49, 1949–50
- Birmingham Senior Cup
  - Winners 1978–79, 1980–81, 1981–82
- Midland Floodlit Cup
  - Winners 1981–82, 1992–93

== Records ==
- Best FA Cup performance: Fourth qualifying round, 1951–52, 1952–53, 1989–90, 1996–97, 2009–10
- Best FA Trophy performance: Second round, 1980–81, 1998–99, 1999–2000, 2001–02, 2004–05
- Record attendance: 5,147 vs Nuneaton Borough, Southern League Midland Division, 23 February 1982
- Most appearances: Peter Spacey (1949–1969)
- Most goals: Peter Spacey
- Record transfer fee received: £30,000 from Plymouth Argyle for Richard Landon, 1994
- Record transfer fee paid: £1,750 to Hinckley Town for Colin Taylor, 1991–92

== See also ==
- Bedworth United F.C. players
- Bedworth United F.C. managers
