= Beaconsfield Town F.C. =

English football club

Coordinates: 51°35′36″N 0°37′47″W

Beaconsfield Town
- Full name: Beaconsfield Town Football Club
- Nickname: The Rams
- Founded: 1994 (as Beaconsfield SYCOB)
- Ground: Holloways Park, Beaconsfield
- Chairman: Chris Coyle
- Manager: Sam Togwell
- League: Southern League Division One Central
- 2025–26: Southern League Division One Central, 11th of 22
- Website: beaconsfieldtownfc.co.uk
Home colours	Away colours

Beaconsfield Town Football Club is a football club based in Beaconsfield, Buckinghamshire, England. They are currently members of the Southern League Division One Central and play at Holloways Park.

== History ==
The club was established as Beaconsfield SYCOB in 1994 by a merger of Beaconsfield United of the Spartan League and Slough Youth Club Old Boys of the Chiltonian League, with the new club taking Beaconsfield United's place in the Premier Division of the Spartan League; Beaconsfield United had played in the Spartan League since 1979 and won the Senior Division in 1982–83, earning promotion to the Premier Division, whilst Slough Youth Club Old Boys had been members of the Chiltonian League since 1990. When the league merged with the South Midlands League to form the Spartan South Midlands League in 1997, Beaconsfield were placed in the Premier South Division, finishing as runners-up in the league's first season and earning a place in the Premier Division for the following season.

In 2000–01 Beaconsfield won the Premier Division. After repeating this in 2003–04 they were promoted to Division One East of the Southern League. They were transferred to Division One West for the following season, which became Division One South & West for the 2006–07 season. However, after finishing bottom of the division that season, they were relegated back to the Spartan South Midlands League. The club won the league at the first attempt, and were promoted back to Division One South & West of the Southern League. The following season, 2008–09, saw them finish fourth, qualifying for the promotion play-offs. However, they lost 2–1 to AFC Totton in the semi-finals.

In 2009 Beaconsfield were transferred to Division One Midlands, which became Division One Central the following season. A fifth-place finish in 2011–12 saw them qualify for the play-offs again, this time losing 3–1 in the final to Bedworth United after beating local rivals Slough Town 2–1 in the semi-finals. Another fifth-place finish the following season led to another play-off campaign, but they were beaten 1–0 by Rugby Town in the semi-finals. In 2017 the club changed its name to Beaconsfield Town, two years after the move was first announced. The 2017–18 season saw them win the renamed East Division, earning promotion to the Premier Division South.

In 2023–24 Beaconsfield finished fourth-from-bottom of the Premier Division South and were relegated to Division One South.

== Club staff ==
Position	Name
Director of Football	Tristan Lewis
Manager	Sam Togwell
Assistant Manager	Tom Donati
Goalkeeping Coach	Aaron Dillon
Physio	Phil Gray
Sources: Bucks Free Press

== Ground ==
The club play at Holloways Park on Windsor Road in Beaconsfield, which was used by Beaconsfield United from 1971 after moving from their previous ground due to the land being needed for the M40. Floodlights were installed in 1991 and a large clubhouse incorporating a 200-capacity covered terrace built behind one goal.

== Honours ==
- Southern League
  - East Division champions 2017–18
- Spartan South Midlands League
  - Premier Division champions 2000–01, 2003–04, 2007–08
  - Challenge Trophy winners 2001–02
  - Premier Division Cup winners 2007–08
- Berks & Bucks Senior Cup
  - Winners 2012–13
- Berks & Bucks Senior Trophy
  - Winners 2003–04, 2007–08

== Records ==
- Best FA Cup performance: Fourth qualifying round, 2016–17
- Best FA Trophy performance: Second round, 2022–23, 2023–24
- Best FA Vase performance: Second round, 2003–04
- Most goals: Allan Arthur

== See also ==
- Beaconsfield Town F.C. players
- Beaconsfield Town F.C. managers
