= Dale Evans (footballer) =

Australian rules footballer

Personal information
- Full name: Dale Evans
- Born: 13 June 1960 (age 66)
- Original team: East Sandringham
- Height: 191 cm (6 ft 3 in)
- Weight: 83 kg (183 lb)

Playing career^{1}
Years	Club	Games (Goals)
1977–79	St Kilda	19 (4)
- ^{1} Playing statistics correct to the end of 1979.

Dale Evans (born 13 June 1960) is a former Australian rules footballer who played with St Kilda in the Victorian Football League (VFL).
