= 2013–14 Southern Football League =

The 2013–14 season was the 111th in the history of the Southern League, which is an English football competition featuring semi-professional and amateur clubs from the South West, South Central and Midlands of England and South Wales. From the 2013–14 season onwards, the Southern League is known as The Calor Gas League Southern, following a sponsorship deal with Calor Gas.

Following the liquidation of Premier Division club Hinckley United and the resignation of Thatcham Town from Division One South & West at the end of the season, plus the resignation of Vauxhall Motors from the Conference North, Fleet Town were reprieved from relegation in Division One South & West.

== Premier Division ==
The Premier Division expanded up to 24 clubs and consisted of 17 clubs from the previous season and seven new clubs:

- Two clubs promoted from Division One Central:
  - Biggleswade Town
  - Burnham
- Two clubs promoted from Division One South & West:
  - Hungerford Town
  - Poole Town
- Two clubs relegated from the Conference North
  - Corby Town
  - Hinckley United
- Plus:
  - Truro City, relegated from the Conference South

=== League table ===
Southern Football League Premier Division
- Season: 2013–14
- Champions: Hemel Hempstead Town
- Promoted: Hemel Hempstead Town; St Albans City
- Relegated: AFC Totton; Bedford Town; Bashley
- Matches: 506
- Goals: 1,711 (3.38 per match)
- Top goalscorer: Adam Marriott (Cambridge City) – 35 goals
- Biggest home win: Hemel Hempstead Town 10 – 0 Bashley, 5 November 2013
- Biggest away win: Chippenham Town 0 – 9 Stourbridge, 29 October 2013
- Highest scoring: Truro City 3 – 7 St Albans City, 5 October 2013; Hemel Hempstead Town 10 – 0 Bashley, 5 November 2013
- Highest attendance: 1943 – Hemel Hempstead Town 0 – 0 Chesham United, 21 April 2014
- Lowest attendance: 62 – Hungerford Town 1 – 1 Biggleswade Town, 19 November 2013
- Total attendance: 150,771
- Average attendance: 298

Pos	Team	Pld	W	D	L	GF	GA	GD	Pts	Promotion or relegation
1	Hemel Hempstead Town	44	32	6	6	128	38	+90	102	Promoted to the Conference South
2	Chesham United	44	29	5	10	102	47	+55	92	Qualified for the play-offs
3	Cambridge City	44	27	7	10	95	49	+46	88	Qualified for the play-offs
4	St Albans City	44	25	10	9	89	49	+40	85	Qualified for the play-offs, then promoted to the Conference South
5	Stourbridge	44	26	6	12	114	54	+60	84	Qualified for the play-offs, then transferred to the Northern Premier League Premier Division
6	Hungerford Town	44	26	6	12	83	45	+38	84	
7	Poole Town	44	25	10	9	82	48	+34	82 (Note: Poole Town were deducted three points for fielding an ineligible player against Redditch United on 14 December 2013.)	
8	Bideford	44	18	13	13	75	64	+11	67	
9	Biggleswade Town	44	16	16	12	85	61	+24	64	
10	Redditch United	44	20	3	21	68	85	−17	63	
11	Corby Town	44	18	6	20	65	68	−3	60	
12	Weymouth	44	18	6	20	69	80	−11	60	
13	Hitchin Town	44	16	11	17	63	52	+11	59	
14	Frome Town	44	16	9	19	63	74	−11	57	
15	Arlesey Town	44	15	10	19	68	79	−11	55	
16	St Neots Town	44	15	9	20	74	76	−2	54	
17	Truro City	44	15	9	20	68	84	−16	54	
18	Chippenham Town	44	14	6	24	59	87	−28	48	
19	Banbury United	44	14	5	25	64	116	−52	47	
20	Burnham	44	12	8	24	60	91	−31	44	
21	AFC Totton	44	10	7	27	58	119	−61	37	Relegated to Division One South & West
22	Bedford Town	44	6	6	32	46	114	−68	24	Relegated to Division One Central
23	Bashley	44	4	4	36	33	131	−98	16	Relegated to Division One South & West
24	Hinckley United	0	0	0	0	0	0	0	0 (Note: Hinckley United folded on 7 October 2013, and their record of P10 W1 D3 L6 GF9 GA20 Pts6 was officially expunged from the league table on 21 October.)	Club folded, record expunged

Source: fchd.com
Rules for classification: 1) points; 2) goal difference; 3) number of goals scored.

=== Play-offs ===
Semifinals
2	Chesham United	2
5	Stourbridge	1
3	Cambridge City	2
4	St Albans City	4

Final
2	Chesham United	1
4	St Albans City	3

Semi-finals

29 April 2014	Chesham United	2–1	Stourbridge	The Meadow, Chesham
19:45	Roberts 31'; Dillon 64'		Brown 21'	Attendance: 728

30 April 2014	Cambridge City	2–4	St Albans City	Bridge Road, Impington
19:45	Kelly 45'; Marriott 62'		Frendo 5'; Wales 23'; Martin 48'; Comley 82'	Attendance: 768

Final

5 May 2014	Chesham United	1–3	St Albans City	The Meadow, Chesham
15:00	Potton 6'		Frendo 36', 59'; Wales 45+2'	Attendance: 2,960

=== Results ===
Home \ Away	TOT	ARL	BAN	BAS	BED	BID	BIG	BUR	CAM	CHE	CHI	COR	FRO	HEM	HIT	HUN	POO	RED	SAC	STN	STB	TRU	WEY
AFC Totton		2–2	1–3	3–1	1–1	2–2	1–5	2–1	3–2	0–2	3–1	2–1	0–5	1–4	0–5	1–3	3–1	0–3	2–5	2–2	1–4	2–3	0–1
Arlesey Town	2–2		2–1	0–1	3–0	1–1	3–2	2–2	0–2	3–2	1–0	1–1	1–2	2–3	0–0	5–2	2–2	0–3	2–3	1–1	1–5	1–1	2–3
Banbury United	3–4	3–2		3–3	3–0	1–0	6–4	2–2	1–5	0–4	2–0	3–1	1–2	0–3	2–1	0–7	0–0	2–0	1–5	0–1	0–4	1–2	0–0
Bashley	0–2	1–4	2–3		0–2	0–1	0–7	1–2	0–6	0–1	3–1	1–3	0–4	1–4	0–2	0–2	0–3	2–3	1–2	1–3	1–4	2–2	0–3
Bedford Town	3–2	0–2	2–0	0–1		2–4	1–5	3–3	0–4	0–3	0–3	2–4	0–2	0–3	0–1	1–4	1–5	1–2	2–2	1–2	2–0	0–1	0–3
Bideford	4–0	0–1	2–2	4–2	4–0		1–1	4–0	1–4	1–4	4–1	1–1	2–2	1–0	3–1	0–0	0–0	4–3	1–0	3–2	0–1	0–0	2–1
Biggleswade Town	1–1	2–1	1–2	0–0	4–1	3–0		1–1	1–2	3–2	3–3	0–1	2–0	5–2	3–2	0–1	2–2	0–0	0–0	2–2	2–2	2–1	2–1
Burnham	2–3	1–2	1–2	1–1	3–1	1–3	0–3		0–3	1–3	4–1	2–1	1–1	0–3	1–0	1–0	2–0	2–4	2–3	1–0	2–0	1–2	1–3
Cambridge City	3–0	2–1	3–1	7–1	1–0	1–1	1–1	7–2		1–2	2–1	1–0	2–0	1–1	3–2	0–0	1–2	4–1	0–3	3–2	2–1	4–1	4–2
Chesham United	4–1	3–3	8–0	4–1	3–0	2–2	2–1	1–2	3–0		2–0	2–1	2–1	1–3	1–2	1–0	0–2	3–1	1–0	3–0	0–1	4–2	0–0
Chippenham Town	1–2	0–1	2–0	2–0	1–4	2–4	1–3	2–1	1–0	0–3		0–0	3–3	0–3	2–0	2–3	1–2	3–0	1–1	2–1	0–9	3–1	2–1
Corby Town	3–1	1–3	4–2	3–1	2–0	3–0	1–1	0–3	0–2	2–1	2–2		0–1	0–2	1–2	0–2	0–3	2–3	2–0	1–0	3–4	3–2	3–1
Frome Town	1–0	0–1	3–2	1–2	4–4	2–0	0–0	4–1	0–0	1–4	0–5	1–3		1–1	2–0	0–2	1–3	4–0	0–0	5–4	0–2	1–2	1–2
Hemel Hempstead Town	8–1	3–0	5–3	10–0	6–1	4–1	3–0	3–0	1–1	2–1	2–0	6–0	0–1		0–0	2–1	1–0	5–0	0–0	2–0	4–3	3–0	4–1
Hitchin Town	1–1	1–0	5–0	1–0	6–1	0–1	1–0	1–1	1–0	1–2	3–1	0–2	1–2	2–0		0–2	2–2	0–2	1–1	4–0	1–1	2–3	3–2
Hungerford Town	4–0	3–0	3–1	3–1	2–0	2–1	1–1	2–3	3–2	0–1	1–1	1–2	0–0	0–4	2–3		2–0	0–2	3–1	1–0	1–0	6–0	2–1
Poole Town	2–0	5–3	4–1	5–0	1–3	3–3	2–1	0–0	0–1	1–0	3–1	3–1	4–2	0–2	1–0	0–0		2–1	2–1	2–0	1–2	1–0	2–2
Redditch United	2–1	1–3	2–3	4–0	2–0	3–1	2–2	2–1	4–1	1–2	3–0	1–3	1–0	1–0	1–0	0–5	0–2		1–3	0–0	1–6	3–1	0–4
St Albans City	4–2	5–0	3–2	2–0	2–1	1–1	1–0	5–2	0–1	2–2	1–0	1–0	4–0	2–2	2–1	2–0	0–1	2–1		1–1	1–2	1–3	3–0
St Neots Town	6–0	3–1	3–1	3–1	2–2	2–0	3–4	4–2	1–2	0–5	1–2	0–3	3–1	4–1	1–1	3–0	1–1	2–3	2–3		1–1	2–0	0–2
Stourbridge	3–0	0–2	5–0	4–1	2–1	0–3	2–1	1–0	3–2	2–3	0–1	3–1	7–0	1–4	1–1	1–2	5–2	5–1	0–1	2–1		2–2	7–0
Truro City	3–2	2–0	5–0	5–0	2–2	0–2	0–2	3–0	0–1	1–1	1–3	0–0	0–2	1–6	1–1	1–2	0–2	1–0	3–7	2–3	1–1		2–1
Weymouth	2–1	2–1	0–1	2–0	4–1	3–2	2–2	2–1	1–1	2–4	4–1	1–0	2–0	0–3	1–1	1–3	0–3	3–0	0–3	1–2	0–5	2–5	

Updated to match(es) played on unknown. Source: Southern Football League
Legend: Blue = home team win; Yellow = draw; Red = away team win.

=== Stadia and locations ===
Locations of the Premier Division clubs

Club	Stadium	Capacity
AFC Totton	Testwood Stadium	3,000
Arlesey Town	Hitchin Road	2,920
Banbury United	Spencer Stadium	2,000
Bashley	Bashley Road	2,000
Bedford Town	The Eyrie	3,000
Bideford	The Sports Ground	2,000
Biggleswade Town	The Carlsberg Stadium	3,000
Burnham	The Gore	2,500
Cambridge City	Bridge Road (groundshare with Histon)	4,300
Chesham United	The Meadow	5,000
Chippenham Town	Hardenhuish Park	2,815
Corby Town	Steel Park	3,893
Frome Town	Badgers Hill	2,000
Hemel Hempstead Town	Vauxhall Road	3,152
Hinckley United	De Montfort Park	4,329
Hitchin Town	Top Field	4,000
Hungerford Town	Bulpit Lane	2,500
Poole Town	Tatnam Ground	2,500
Redditch United	The Valley	5,000
St Albans City	Clarence Park	5,007
St Neots Town	New Rowley Park	3,500
Stourbridge	War Memorial Athletic Ground	2,626
Truro City	Treyew Road	3,200
Weymouth	Bob Lucas Stadium	6,600

== Division One Central ==
Division One Central consisted of 22 clubs, including 15 clubs from previous season and seven new clubs:

- Aylesbury United, promoted from the Spartan South Midlands League
- Dunstable Town, promoted from the Spartan South Midlands League
- Egham Town, promoted from the Combined Counties League
- Kettering Town, relegated from the Premier Division
- Marlow, promoted from the Hellenic League
- Potters Bar Town, transferred from Isthmian League Division One North
- St Ives Town, promoted from the United Counties League

=== League table ===
Southern Football League Division One Central
- Season: 2013–14
- Champions: Dunstable Town
- Promoted: Dunstable Town; Slough Town
- Relegated: Chertsey Town; Ashford Town
- Matches: 462
- Goals: 1,526 (3.3 per match)
- Top goalscorer: David Kolodynski (Rugby Town) – 35 goals
- Biggest home win: Rugby Town 8 – 1 Chertsey Town, 21 September 2013; Potters Bar Town 7 – 0 Chertsey Town, 29 March 2014
- Biggest away win: North Greenford United 1 – 7 Slough Town, 25 March 2014; A.F.C. Hayes 0 – 6 Rugby Town, 26 April 2014
- Highest scoring: Northwood 8 – 3 Chertsey Town, 8 October 2013
- Highest attendance: 1228 – Kettering Town 2 – 0 Daventry Town, 21 August 2013
- Lowest attendance: 36 – Chalfont St Peter 2 – 1 Chertsey Town, 26 April 2014
- Total attendance: 73,575
- Average attendance: 159

Pos	Team	Pld	W	D	L	GF	GA	GD	Pts	Promotion or relegation
1	Dunstable Town	42	28	6	8	94	44	+50	90	Promoted to the Premier Division
2	Rugby Town	42	27	8	7	100	45	+55	89	Qualified for the play-offs
3	Kettering Town	42	27	7	8	86	41	+45	88	Qualified for the play-offs
4	Daventry Town	42	27	5	10	82	40	+42	86	Qualified for the play-offs
5	Slough Town	42	26	5	11	101	51	+50	83	Qualified for the play-offs, then promoted to the Premier Division
6	Barton Rovers	42	24	8	10	79	48	+31	80	
7	Royston Town	42	21	10	11	80	58	+22	73	
8	Beaconsfield SYCOB	42	22	7	13	79	60	+19	73	
9	Northwood	42	21	6	15	72	62	+10	69	
10	Uxbridge	42	18	7	17	84	70	+14	61	
11	Egham Town	42	17	9	16	80	58	+22	60	
12	Aylesbury United	42	16	9	17	64	72	−8	57	
13	St Ives Town	42	16	8	18	68	77	−9	56	
14	Chalfont St Peter	42	14	8	20	49	60	−11	50	
15	Potters Bar Town	42	13	10	19	61	86	−25	49	
16	Aylesbury	42	14	6	22	56	73	−17	48	
17	Marlow	42	12	11	19	73	84	−11	47	
18	A.F.C. Hayes	42	12	8	22	51	74	−23	44	
19	Leighton Town	42	6	13	23	45	85	−40	31	
20	North Greenford United	42	7	5	30	52	114	−62	26	
21	Chertsey Town	42	6	4	32	38	117	−79	22	Relegated to the Combined Counties League
22	Ashford Town	42	5	6	31	32	107	−75	21	Relegated to the Combined Counties League

Source: fchd.com
Rules for classification: 1) points; 2) goal difference; 3) number of goals scored.

=== Play-offs ===
Semifinals
2	Rugby Town	0
5	Slough Town	3
3	Kettering Town	1
4	Daventry Town	0

Final
3	Kettering Town	2
5	Slough Town	3

Semi-finals

29 April 2014	Rugby Town	0–3	Slough Town	Butlin Road, Rugby
19:45			Smith 65'; Dyer 70'; W. Harris 75'	Attendance: 522

29 April 2014	Kettering Town	1–0	Daventry Town	Latimer Park, Burton Latimer
19:45	Eze 2'			Attendance: 1,446

Final

5 May 2014	Kettering Town	2–3	Slough Town	Latimer Park, Burton Latimer
15:00	Logan 12'; Eze 22'		Dyer 55', 65'; McClurg 77'	Attendance: 2,331

=== Results ===
Home \ Away	HAY	ASH	AYB	AYL	BAR	BEA	CHA	CHE	DAV	DUN	EGH	KET	LEI	MAR	NGU	NOR	POT	ROY	RUG	SLO	STI	UXB
A.F.C. Hayes		1–2	3–1	2–5	0–2	0–1	0–1	0–2	1–2	0–2	0–4	2–1	2–2	0–0	3–1	1–0	1–1	2–1	0–6	0–1	1–1	0–4
Ashford Town	2–1		0–0	1–2	0–1	1–4	0–1	0–2	2–1	0–1	2–2	0–2	3–1	0–4	1–2	0–3	0–2	0–2	1–1	0–5	0–1	0–4
Aylesbury	1–1	5–0		3–1	2–0	3–3	1–3	1–2	1–2	0–4	0–3	1–3	3–0	2–0	3–1	0–2	1–0	0–3	0–0	3–1	5–1	0–3
Aylesbury United	3–2	1–0	1–3		1–1	2–0	1–0	1–0	0–2	1–3	0–0	0–3	1–1	0–1	3–1	0–0	0–0	0–1	0–2	3–3	3–3	1–2
Barton Rovers	1–0	2–0	3–2	4–0		1–1	2–1	7–2	1–2	2–0	3–1	3–1	2–0	4–1	5–1	0–3	1–3	4–0	1–4	1–2	2–2	1–1
Beaconsfield SYCOB	4–1	2–0	3–1	4–1	0–4		1–1	0–1	1–0	2–3	3–2	0–2	1–1	1–1	3–2	0–2	6–2	2–2	1–4	3–1	0–2	3–1
Chalfont St Peter	2–2	3–1	0–1	1–3	1–2	2–1		2–1	1–1	0–1	1–2	1–3	2–3	2–3	2–1	0–1	1–0	0–1	0–2	0–1	0–1	1–1
Chertsey Town	1–4	3–4	4–3	1–3	0–1	1–2	0–1		0–2	0–5	1–4	0–3	0–0	1–1	1–3	0–2	1–2	0–2	2–6	0–4	0–4	0–5
Daventry Town	3–0	5–2	4–0	2–0	3–1	1–0	0–1	2–0		0–3	2–0	0–3	5–0	1–1	4–1	2–0	5–0	0–0	5–0	2–2	5–1	2–1
Dunstable Town	1–0	8–2	3–1	3–0	0–1	2–3	2–1	2–1	3–1		0–1	4–1	2–2	2–0	4–1	3–2	1–1	2–2	3–0	3–2	2–1	1–0
Egham Town	1–1	4–0	0–1	1–2	1–1	0–3	2–0	4–1	4–1	1–2		0–3	0–2	4–1	1–0	2–4	6–0	1–2	1–1	2–2	1–2	1–4
Kettering Town	3–1	4–0	3–0	4–3	0–3	1–1	1–1	2–0	2–0	2–0	1–0		5–1	1–1	1–0	3–0	4–0	5–0	0–2	1–5	4–1	2–1
Leighton Town	2–3	4–0	0–2	0–1	0–1	2–3	1–1	0–0	1–2	1–6	0–0	0–0		4–2	1–1	1–3	1–2	1–2	0–1	1–0	1–1	2–2
Marlow	0–3	2–1	4–1	3–2	1–1	2–0	1–4	1–2	1–2	2–1	2–4	1–3	0–0		4–2	2–0	6–0	2–4	2–6	2–2	3–3	1–1
North Greenford United	0–3	3–0	0–0	3–4	1–3	0–4	0–2	3–2	0–1	3–1	0–5	2–3	2–3	3–1		0–1	2–3	0–5	1–5	1–7	0–3	3–6
Northwood	2–1	1–1	0–1	1–1	2–1	0–1	2–0	8–3	0–3	1–3	0–1	0–0	4–2	2–7	3–0		1–2	3–1	2–1	0–2	3–0	2–1
Potters Bar Town	2–1	1–1	2–1	0–3	1–2	2–0	1–1	7–0	0–1	1–1	1–1	2–0	4–1	3–3	1–1	1–1		1–4	0–1	0–3	1–2	3–2
Royston Town	1–3	2–2	2–0	1–2	2–2	3–1	3–0	4–0	0–1	0–0	2–2	0–0	2–1	4–0	3–3	2–2	4–2		1–0	0–1	1–4	1–0
Rugby Town	2–0	1–0	3–2	1–1	2–0	0–1	0–0	8–1	2–1	0–0	3–1	1–1	4–0	3–2	2–2	4–2	6–1	6–1		0–4	1–0	3–1
Slough Town	1–2	4–2	2–0	5–3	4–0	1–3	5–1	1–0	3–1	4–0	1–3	0–2	4–1	2–1	3–0	0–1	4–3	2–1	1–2		1–0	1–2
St Ives Town	1–1	4–0	2–0	2–4	0–0	1–4	3–4	2–1	1–1	1–4	3–2	0–1	3–0	1–0	0–1	4–5	2–1	0–5	0–3	0–3		0–1
Uxbridge	1–2	5–1	1–1	2–1	0–2	1–3	2–3	1–1	0–2	0–3	0–5	4–2	3–1	2–1	4–1	5–1	3–2	1–3	3–1	1–1	2–5	

Updated to match(es) played on unknown. Source: Southern Football League
Legend: Blue = home team win; Yellow = draw; Red = away team win.

=== Stadia and locations ===
Locations of Division One Central clubs
Greater London Division One Central Clubs

Club	Stadium	Capacity
A.F.C. Hayes	Farm Park	1,500
Ashford Town	The Robert Parker Stadium	2,550
Aylesbury	Haywood Way	1,300
Aylesbury United	Bell Close (groundshare with Leighton Town)	2,800
Barton Rovers	Sharpenhoe Road	4,000
Beaconsfield SYCOB	Holloways Park	3,500
Chalfont St Peter	Mill Meadow	1,500
Chertsey Town	Alwyns Lane	2,500
Daventry Town	Communications Park	5,000
Dunstable Town	Creasey Park	3,200
Egham Town	The Runnymede Stadium	5,565
Kettering Town	Latimer Park (groundshare with Burton Park Wanderers)	2,400
Leighton Town	Bell Close	2,800
Marlow	Alfred Davis Memorial Ground	3,000
North Greenford United	Berkeley Fields	2,000
Northwood	Northwood Park	3,075
Potters Bar Town	Parkfield	2,000
Royston Town	Garden Walk	5,000
Rugby Town	Butlin Road	6,000
Slough Town	Holloways Park (groundshare with Beaconsfield SYCOB)	3,500
St Ives Town	Westwood Road	2,000
Uxbridge	Honeycroft	3,770

== Division One South & West ==
Division One South & West consisted of 22 clubs, including 17 clubs from previous season and five new clubs:

- Four clubs transferred from Division One Central:
  - Fleet Town
  - Godalming Town
  - Guildford City
  - Thatcham Town
- Plus:
  - Stratford Town, promoted from the Midland Alliance

=== League table ===
Southern Football League Division One South & West
- Season: 2013–14
- Champions: Cirencester Town
- Promoted: Cirencester Town; Paulton Rovers
- Relegated: Guildford City
- Matches: 462
- Goals: 1,595 (3.45 per match)
- Top goalscorer: Richard Gregory (Stratford Town) – 36
- Biggest home win: Merthyr Town 12 – 0 Guildford City, 8 February 2014
- Biggest away win: Guildford City 0 – 7 North Leigh, 12 April 2014
- Highest scoring: Merthyr Town 12 – 0 Guildford City, 8 February 2014
- Highest attendance: 712 – Merthyr Town 1 – 0 Evesham United, 21 April 2014
- Lowest attendance: 40 – North Leigh 1 – 0 Thatcham Town, 18 February 2014
- Total attendance: 69,780
- Average attendance: 151

Pos	Team	Pld	W	D	L	GF	GA	GD	Pts	Promotion or relegation
1	Cirencester Town	42	29	5	8	95	45	+50	92	Promoted to the Premier Division
2	Merthyr Town	42	28	5	9	111	58	+53	89	Qualified for the play-offs
3	Tiverton Town	42	26	8	8	80	51	+29	86	Qualified for the play-offs
4	Paulton Rovers	42	24	9	9	102	54	+48	81	Qualified for the play-offs, then promoted to the Premier Division
5	Swindon Supermarine	42	24	7	11	91	52	+39	79	Qualified for the play-offs
6	Shortwood United	42	23	9	10	91	44	+47	78	
7	North Leigh	42	22	6	14	84	46	+38	72	
8	Taunton Town	42	21	7	14	71	58	+13	69 (Note: Taunton Town were deducted one point for fielding an ineligible player in two games during August 2013.)	
9	Yate Town	42	20	8	14	81	69	+12	68	
10	Stratford Town	42	19	5	18	103	86	+17	62	
11	Mangotsfield United	42	18	7	17	65	62	+3	61	
12	Didcot Town	42	17	6	19	70	85	−15	57	
13	Wimborne Town	42	16	7	19	78	70	+8	55	
14	Bridgwater Town	42	14	11	17	62	64	−2	53	
15	Cinderford Town	42	13	10	19	69	79	−10	49	
16	Evesham United	42	12	11	19	66	80	−14	47	
17	Clevedon Town	42	12	5	25	48	96	−48	41	
18	Godalming Town	42	10	9	23	47	79	−32	39	Transferred to Division One Central
19	Thatcham Town	42	11	6	25	41	99	−58	39	Resigned to the Hellenic League
20	Bishop's Cleeve	42	11	1	30	52	94	−42	34	
21	Fleet Town	42	7	8	27	43	90	−47	29 (Note: Fleet Town were reprieved from relegation.)	
22	Guildford City	42	7	6	29	45	134	−89	27	Relegated to the Combined Counties League

Source: fchd.com
Rules for classification: 1) points; 2) goal difference; 3) number of goals scored.

=== Play-offs ===
Semifinals
2	Merthyr Town	5
5	Swindon Supermarine	2
3	Tiverton Town	1
4	Paulton Rovers	3

Final
2	Merthyr Town	0
4	Paulton Rovers	2

Semi-finals

29 April 2014	Merthyr Town	5–2	Swindon Supermarine	Penydarren Park, Merthyr Tydfil
19:45	Colborne 14', 49'; McLaggon 40', 75'; Traylor 84'		Edenborough 37', 44'	Attendance: 920

29 April 2014	Tiverton Town	1–3	Paulton Rovers	Ladysmead, Tiverton
19:30	Nardiello 33'		McCootie 43', 63'; Mapstone 54'	Attendance: 354

Final

5 May 2014	Merthyr Town	0–2	Paulton Rovers	Penydarren Park, Merthyr Tydfil
15:00			McCootie 50', 66' (pen.)	Attendance: 2,201

=== Results ===
Home \ Away	BIS	BRI	CIN	CIR	CLE	DID	EVE	FLE	GOD	GUI	MAN	MER	NRL	PAU	SHO	STR	SWI	TAU	THA	TIV	WIM	YAT
Bishop's Cleeve		2–0	0–3	0–4	0–5	1–3	1–2	0–2	5–0	0–2	3–0	1–0	0–5	0–2	2–1	2–4	0–3	1–3	3–4	3–0	1–3	0–2
Bridgwater Town	5–1		1–1	1–3	1–0	0–0	1–1	0–0	2–2	4–2	0–3	0–2	1–1	2–0	1–3	4–3	1–1	3–1	6–3	1–2	1–1	1–1
Cinderford Town	4–1	2–0		1–3	0–1	2–3	1–3	5–0	1–0	4–2	1–3	0–3	0–4	2–3	1–1	1–3	1–3	1–3	1–1	0–2	1–1	1–2
Cirencester Town	2–0	1–4	2–0		7–0	3–1	2–1	2–2	2–2	6–1	2–1	4–1	0–0	2–2	2–1	2–0	0–1	3–1	7–0	0–0	4–3	0–1
Clevedon Town	2–3	1–2	1–2	3–0		0–2	1–1	3–2	1–0	2–1	2–3	0–2	0–2	1–7	0–5	1–5	1–2	1–1	1–1	0–4	3–1	3–1
Didcot Town	0–4	2–2	1–1	3–2	6–2		1–3	1–0	2–0	3–2	2–2	3–4	2–1	1–3	2–3	1–4	2–3	0–3	4–0	0–1	1–0	2–0
Evesham United	2–3	3–2	0–3	2–3	3–1	1–2		2–1	1–1	1–1	0–3	1–4	4–0	2–3	2–1	1–1	2–2	4–4	5–0	1–1	2–6	3–0
Fleet Town	0–2	0–2	1–3	0–1	2–0	1–2	0–0		2–1	2–3	1–1	1–2	2–1	2–2	1–2	2–7	3–0	0–1	2–3	0–3	2–1	0–6
Godalming Town	1–0	1–3	2–2	1–2	0–2	3–0	2–3	1–0		1–0	0–3	2–2	2–2	0–5	4–3	1–2	1–1	0–1	1–2	0–2	0–1	3–1
Guildford City	1–0	0–3	1–3	0–5	3–2	1–2	2–2	3–2	0–0		1–2	2–3	0–7	1–3	0–0	0–1	1–1	2–1	0–3	1–4	0–3	3–3
Mangotsfield United	4–2	0–0	1–0	2–3	1–1	0–2	3–2	2–0	1–1	5–3		4–0	1–2	1–1	1–0	2–0	1–0	1–2	1–2	0–1	1–0	1–2
Merthyr Town	1–0	3–0	4–4	3–1	6–0	5–1	1–0	3–1	5–0	12–0	3–0		3–2	3–2	2–1	5–1	3–1	1–0	4–0	3–3	3–2	3–3
North Leigh	2–1	2–1	4–1	0–1	0–1	2–1	2–0	3–1	5–0	8–0	4–2	2–1		1–1	2–2	0–4	1–0	0–1	1–0	3–2	0–1	3–0
Paulton Rovers	4–1	1–0	3–1	0–1	0–0	3–3	3–1	1–2	2–1	4–0	2–0	5–2	1–0		0–3	3–4	1–1	2–3	4–0	4–0	7–0	1–2
Shortwood United	1–0	2–0	6–1	1–2	0–1	4–1	2–0	1–1	2–0	4–0	4–0	0–0	2–1	3–6		2–1	1–1	3–1	3–0	3–3	3–0	0–0
Stratford Town	5–2	1–2	1–3	0–2	3–1	1–1	0–1	2–2	1–3	4–0	3–2	0–1	2–1	1–2	0–4		4–3	5–3	7–1	2–4	4–2	3–3
Swindon Supermarine	5–3	2–0	2–2	3–2	2–0	2–4	3–0	4–1	4–1	5–0	4–1	1–0	2–0	3–0	2–3	3–1		4–1	5–0	1–2	2–0	1–2
Taunton Town	3–1	1–0	0–0	1–0	2–0	4–0	2–1	3–0	1–2	2–3	2–1	2–1	1–3	1–1	1–1	2–1	1–3		3–0	1–2	0–0	2–2
Thatcham Town	0–0	3–1	1–3	0–1	1–2	2–0	1–1	0–0	0–2	3–1	1–1	0–2	0–1	0–3	0–6	1–5	0–2	0–3		3–1	1–0	3–1
Tiverton Town	1–0	3–1	2–1	1–2	2–0	4–1	2–1	2–1	2–1	2–0	2–3	4–1	0–0	0–0	0–2	4–3	3–0	2–1	1–0		4–4	1–0
Wimborne Town	1–2	1–2	2–2	0–1	4–1	5–2	6–0	2–1	2–1	8–1	0–1	2–1	2–1	1–2	0–2	3–3	1–0	1–2	2–0	2–0		3–3
Yate Town	2–1	2–1	2–3	1–3	6–1	1–0	2–1	7–0	1–3	4–1	1–0	2–3	0–5	2–3	2–0	3–1	1–3	2–0	2–1	1–1	2–1	

Updated to match(es) played on unknown. Source: Southern Football League
Legend: Blue = home team win; Yellow = draw; Red = away team win.

=== Stadia and locations ===
Locations of Division One South & West clubs

Club	Stadium	Capacity
Bishops Cleeve	Kayte Lane	1,500
Bridgwater Town	Fairfax Park	2,500
Cinderford Town	Causeway Ground	3,500
Cirencester Town	Corinium Stadium	4,500
Clevedon Town	Hand Stadium	3,500
Didcot Town	Draycott Engineering Loop Meadow Stadium	3,000
Evesham United	Spiers and Hartwell Jubilee Stadium	3,000
Fleet Town	Calthorpe Park	2,000
Godalming Town	Weycourt	3,000
Guildford City	Guildford Spectrum	2,000
Mangotsfield United	Cossham Street	2,500
Merthyr Town	Penydarren Park	10,000
North Leigh	Eynsham Hall Park Sports Ground	2,000
Paulton Rovers	Athletic Field	2,500
Shortwood United	Meadowbank Ground	2,000
Stratford Town	DCS Stadium	1,400
Swindon Supermarine	Hunts Copse Ground	3,000
Taunton Town	Wordsworth Drive	2,500
Thatcham Town	Waterside Park	1,500
Tiverton Town	Ladysmead	3,500
Wimborne Town	The Cuthbury	3,250
Yate Town	Lodge Road	2,000

== League Cup ==
2013–14 Southern League Cup
Tournament details
- Country: England
- Teams: 68

Final positions
- Champions: St Neots Town
- Runners-up: Tiverton Town

The Southern League Cup 2013–14 (billed as the RedInsure Cup 2013–14 for sponsorship reasons) is the 76th season of the Southern League Cup, the cup competition of the Southern Football League.

=== Preliminary round ===
24 September 2013	AFC Totton	1–3	Wimborne Town	Testwood Stadium, Totton
19:45 BST (UTC+01)	Roberts 23'		Davidson 8'; Kemble 23'; Gamble 90+2'	Attendance: 196

=== First round ===
14 October 2013	Hemel Hempstead Town	2–4	Aylesbury United
19:45 BST (UTC+01)	Diarra 80'; Toomey 89'		Field 22', 32', 90+1'; Armstrong 85'	Attendance: 211

14 October 2013	Hinckley United	w/o	Corby Town
19:45 BST (UTC+01)
Note: Hinckley United were disbanded on 7 October 2013, and Corby Town were awarded a walkover.

14 October 2013	Hungerford Town	3–1	Didcot Town
19:45 BST (UTC+01)	Hopkins 22'; Stanley 89'; O'Brien 90 +2'		Mills 40'	Attendance: 70

14 October 2013	Stratford Town	4–6	Redditch United
19:45 BST (UTC+01)	Sterling 4'; Halsall 19'; Adkins 45'; Fagan 55'		Sterling-James 1'; Parker 7', og' Molyneux 37'; Hands 51'; Headley 74', 81'	Attendance: 140

15 October 2013	Arlesey Town	4–3	Biggleswade Town
19:45 BST (UTC+01)	Forsythe 28', 45'; Frater 53'; Farrell 83'		York 3'; Peacock 24'; Donnelly 90'	Attendance: 96

15 October 2013	Ashford Town	1–3	Northwood
19:45 BST (UTC+01)	Lynch 78'		Muir 46', 66', 88'	Attendance: 34

15 October 2013	Barton Rovers	0–1	Royston Town
19:45 BST (UTC+01)			Hammond 68'	Attendance: 39

15 October 2013	Bideford	3–2	Taunton Town
19:45 BST (UTC+01)	Howe 20'; Downing 30'; Parkins 68'		Pepperell 15'; Murray 65'	Attendance: 86

15 October 2013	Chertsey Town	0–3	Slough Town
19:45 BST (UTC+01)			Smith 67 pen' S Harris 76', 88'	Attendance: 81

15 October 2013	Dunstable Town	1–0	Aylesbury
19:45 BST (UTC+01)	Hutchins 27'			Attendance: 40

15 October 2013	Egham Town	6–1	Guildford City
19:45 BST (UTC+01)	O'Toole 27 pen', 37 pen' Houghton 33'; Graham 54'; Andrews 66'; Joseph 88'		Cox 51 pen'	Attendance: 42

15 October 2013	Evesham United	1–3	Bishop's Cleeve
19:45 BST (UTC+01)	Dovey 73'		Lee 42', 76'; Williams 58'	Attendance: 67

15 October 2013	Marlow	4–0	Fleet Town
19:45 BST (UTC+01)	Gladwin 3'; Bennett 6', 10', 27'			Attendance: 63

15 October 2013	Merthyr Town	4–1	Shortwood United
19:45 BST (UTC+01)	Traylor 11'; Keddle 41'; Morgan 76'; Misbah 78'		Slack 81'	Attendance: 112

15 October 2013	North Greenford United	2–4	Uxbridge
19:45 BST (UTC+01)	Walker 21', 66'		Madigan 11'; Todd 19', 33'; Thomas 50'	Attendance: 51

15 October 2013	St Neots Town	5–0	Hitchin Town
19:45 BST (UTC+01)	Woolley 17', 36'; Deeney 54'; Hilliard 78'; N'Guessan 90'			Attendance: 96

15 October 2013	Thatcham Town	0–3	Beaconsfield Town
19:45 BST (UTC+01)			O'Sullivan 24 pen' Lansiquot 32'; Webb 71'	Attendance: 35

16 October 2013	A.F.C. Hayes	0–4	Burnham
19:45 BST (UTC+01)			Blake 22'; Yorke 49'; Dobson 52'; Grey 75'	Attendance: 48

16 October 2013	Bedford Town	2–3	St Ives Town
19:45 BST (UTC+01)	Ferrari 25'; Phillips 35'		Cunniff 42'; Vieria 55'; Fordham 80'	Attendance: 133

16 October 2013	Chalfont St Peter	1–1 (3–4 p)	Godalming Town
19:45 BST (UTC+01)	Clarke 59'		Mazzone 72'	Attendance: 45

16 October 2013	Chesham United	5–0	Potters Bar Town
19:45 BST (UTC+01)	Potton 53'; Roberts 59', 64 pen' Dillon 81'; Harris 89'			Attendance: 106

16 October 2013	Cinderford Town	0–1	Cirencester Town
19:45 BST (UTC+01)			Bumfrey 85'	Attendance: 61

16 October 2013	Frome Town	1–2	Chippenham Town
19:45 BST (UTC+01)	Wood 18'		Phillips 45'; Knighton 60'	Attendance: 127

16 October 2013	Leighton Town	2–2 (1–4 p)	St Albans City
19:45 BST (UTC+01)	McKee 22'; Gallant 63'		Keemleyside 62'; Henry 76'	Attendance: 109

16 October 2013	Poole Town	1–1 (5–4 p)	Wimborne Town
19:45 BST (UTC+01)	Byerley 62'		Davidson 14'	Attendance: 206

16 October 2013	Swindon Supermarine	3–0	North Leigh
19:45 BST (UTC+01)	Jackson 20', 62', 74'			Attendance: 84

21 October 2013	Kettering Town	5–0	Daventry Town
19:45 BST (UTC+01)	Newman 45'; Fuller 51', 73'; Bukasa 54'; Hamilton 56'			Attendance: 153

22 October 2013	Bashley	0–5	Weymouth
19:45 BST (UTC+01)			Symes 9'; Allen 12', 76'; Ford 15', 40'	Attendance: 112
Note: Match was due to be played on 16 October, but was postponed due to a floodlight failure.

22 October 2013	Bridgwater Town	3–3 (6–5 p)	Truro City
19:45 BST (UTC+01)	Faux 30'; Robbins 74', 89'		Eddy 14', 79'; Brokenshire 36'	Attendance: 117

22 October 2013	Paulton Rovers	1–2	Yate Town
19:45 BST (UTC+01)	Chandler 62', og'		Jackson 26', 51'	Attendance: 81

22 October 2013	Rugby Town	5–2	Banbury United
19:45 BST (UTC+01)	Marsden 27', 62'; Kolodynski 53'; McBride 66', 80'		Lawless 85', 86'	Attendance: 140

29 October 2013	Tiverton Town	4–1	Clevedon Town
19:45 BST (UTC+01)	Emati-Emati 1', 22'; Palmer 11'; Baily 60'		Reid 50'	Attendance: 105

=== Second round ===
18 November 2013	Redditch United	3–2	Rugby Town
19:45 GMT (UTC)	Sterling-James 8'; Ahenkorah 32'; Headley 33'		Youngs 36', 48'	Attendance: 96

25 November 2013	St Albans City	2–4	Beaconsfield Town
19:45 GMT (UTC)	Georgiou 52'; Ngoyi 81'		Lockhart-Adams 29', 63'; McCluskey 25'; Hutchinson 57'	Attendance: 90

12 November 2013	Godalming Town	3–0	Egham Town
19:45 GMT (UTC)	Mazzone 6'; Palmer 84'; Musgrove 90 +2'			Attendance: 86

12 November 2013	Hungerford Town	4–0	Bishop's Cleeve
19:45 GMT (UTC)	O'Brien 30'; Brown 39'; Draycott 47', 89'			Attendance: 63

12 November 2013	Merthyr Town	2–2 (6–5 p)	Chippenham Town
19:45 GMT (UTC)	Griffiths 43' (pen.); Rubery 84'		Knighton 32' (pen.); Tovey 89'	Attendance: 141

12 November 2013	Slough Town	5–1	Uxbridge
19:45 GMT (UTC)	Dyer 7'; Fousler 39'; S Harris 32', 86'; Wheeler 90'		Julienne 57'	Attendance: 127

26 November 2013	St Ives Town	2–3	Royston Town
19:45 GMT (UTC)	Newman 4'; Ogbonna 61'		Fehmi 19'; Edwards 82'; Lockett 85'	Attendance: 124

12 November 2013	Tiverton Town	4–2	Bridgwater Town
19:45 GMT (UTC)	Kelly 36'; Wright 59', 69'; Searle 90 +6'		O'Connor 57'; Mawford 90'	Attendance: 145

13 November 2013	Swindon Supermarine	0–3	Cirencester Town
19:45 GMT (UTC)			Bumphrey 9'; Davidge 30'; J Smith 80'	Attendance: 89

19 November 2013	Arlesey Town	0–3	Kettering Town
19:45 GMT (UTC)			Thorpe 46', 47'; Joseph 77'	Attendance: 84

19 November 2013	Bideford	0–1	Yate Town
19:45 GMT (UTC)			Rogers 88'	Attendance: 87

19 November 2013	Burnham	6–2	Northwood
19:45 GMT (UTC)	Couch 19', 47', 68', 85'; Blake 45+3'; Malloy 82'		Muir 57', 75'	Attendance: 27

19 November 2013	St Neots Town	3–0	Corby Town
19:45 GMT (UTC)	Davies 50'; Hilliard 71'; Wilson 74'			Attendance: 93

20 November 2013	Weymouth	4–0	Poole Town
19:45 GMT (UTC)	Ford 11', 55', 71', 90'			Attendance: 205

20 November 2013	Aylesbury United	2–2 (a.e.t.) (4–3 p)	Chesham United
19:45 GMT (UTC)	Reynolds 13'; Baines 78'		Williams 45' (o.g.); Wales 90'	Attendance: 123

26 November 2013	Dunstable Town	4–3	Marlow
19:45 GMT (UTC)	Cashman 15'; Roache 55'; Marsh 77' (pen.), 84'		Davies 20', 36'; Devontae 58'	Attendance: 33

=== Third round ===
6 January 2014	Beaconsfield Town	2–0	Godalming Town
19:45 GMT (UTC)	O'Reagan 29'; Lockhart-Adams 65'			Attendance: 64

7 January 2014	Burnham	3–3 (4–2 p)	Slough Town
19:45 GMT (UTC)	Blake 6'; Couch 20'; Charles-Smith 75'		S Harris 50'; Rumbold 52'; Hollis 80'	Attendance: 130

7 January 2014	Dunstable Town	0–3	St Neots Town
19:45 GMT (UTC)			Hilliard 3'; Ford 18'; Davies 22'	Attendance: 71

7 January 2014	Merthyr Town	1–1 (4–2 p)	Yate Town
19:45 GMT (UTC)	Thomas 15'		Cox 24'	Attendance: 116

14 January 2014	Weymouth	1–2	Tiverton Town
19:45 GMT (UTC)	Walker 3'		Smith 39'; Richards 45+1'	Attendance: 203

21 January 2014	Cirencester Town	1–4	Hungerford Town
19:45 GMT (UTC)	Shepherd 9'		Brown 53', 80'; Stow 60'; Day 67'	Attendance: 27

21 January 2014	Kettering Town	4–5	Redditch United
19:45 GMT (UTC)	Gooding 15'; Jepson 27'; Moreman 57', 59'		Hylton 18', 34', 69'; Sterling-James 56'; Sammons 77'	Attendance: 216

4 February 2014	Royston Town	6–0	Aylesbury United
19:45 GMT (UTC)	Fehmi 8', 19', 45'; Hammond 15'; Dobson 62'; Mason 75'			Attendance: 94

=== Quarter finals ===
3 February 2014	Redditch United	3–1	Beaconsfield Town
19:45 GMT (UTC)	Hylton 25'; McGarry 35' (o.g.); Sammons 45'		Haule 76'	Attendance: 84

4 February 2014	Hungerford Town	7–3	Burnham
19:45 GMT (UTC)	Clark 6'; Brown 13', 44', 80'; Draycott 22', 51', 76'		Kabamba 35'; Webb 39' (pen.); Wilman 58'	Attendance: 43

4 February 2014	Merthyr Town	0–2	Tiverton Town
19:45 GMT (UTC)			Rewbury 1' (o.g.); Palmer 39'	Attendance: 118

11 February 2014	St Neots Town	3–2	Royston Town
19:45 GMT (UTC)	Nolan 30'; Hilliard 61'; Davies 80'		Fehmi 51' (pen.); Dobson 90'	Attendance: 137

=== Semi-finals ===
24 February 2014	Redditch United	1–3	St Neots Town
19:45 GMT (UTC)	Hylton 23'		Hilliard 50', 52', 85'	Attendance: 153

25 February 2014	Tiverton Town	3–1	Hungerford Town
19:45 GMT (UTC)	Kowal 16'; Smith 21', 37'		Draycott 9'	Attendance: 156

=== Final ===
==== First leg ====
18 March 2014	Tiverton Town	0–0	St Neots Town
19:30 GMT (UTC)				Attendance: 237

==== Second leg ====
8 April 2014	St Neots Town	1–0 (1–0 agg.)	Tiverton Town
19:45 GMT (UTC)	Hilliard 43'			Attendance: 522

== See also ==
- Southern Football League
- 2013–14 Isthmian League
- 2013–14 Northern Premier League
