= Charles Hempel =

Charles Hempel may refer to:

- Charles Frederick Hempel (1811–1867), organist and composer
- Charles Julius Hempel (1811–1879), German-born translator and homeopathic physician
- Charles William Hempel (1777–1855), English organist
