= Idless =

Hamlet in Cornwall, England

Coordinates: 50°17′13″N 5°03′38″W

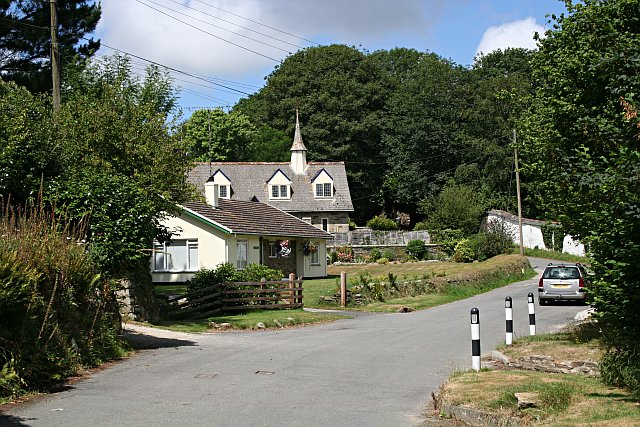
Idless showing the Sanctuary of the Good Shepherd

Idless (Cornish: Edhelys, meaning place of aspen trees) is a hamlet north of Truro in Cornwall, England. The River Allen rises north of St Allen and flows southwards through the Idless Valley into Truro. It is in the civil parish of Kenwyn.

The manor of Idless was recorded in the Domesday Book (1086) when it was held by Algar from Robert, Count of Mortain. There was one hide of land and land for 6 ploughs. Algar had one third of a virgate with 3 ploughs and 4 serfs. 4 villeins and 7 smallholders had the rest of the land. There were 40 acres of woodland, 2 square leagues of pasture, 23 sheep and 7 goats. The value of the manor was 15 shillings though it had formerly been £2 sterling.

There was a military firing-range beside nearby St Clement's Wood, known as "Idless Range", just north of the present-day Penmount Crematorium, which was still in use by at least the local army cadets for Lee-Enfield live-firing in the late 1950s.

== Idless Woods ==
Idless Woods is a nearby mixed woodland managed by Forestry England consisting of Bishop’s wood, Lady’s woods, St Clement’s Wood, and part of Lord’s Wood. Manmade features include an Iron Age hill fort at the top of the woodland, and the ruins of an old gunpowder works beside a tributary of the River Allen on the eastern boundary. At the entrance to the woods, there is a café called The Woodman's Cabin and a car park. The woods contain seven routes that are affiliated to Cornwall Orienteering Club and British Orienteering. Being so close to Truro, Idless Woods is a popular location for walking, running, riding and cycling.

Plant species include alder, ash, aspen, beech, blackthorn, crab apple, downy birch, elder, elm, goat willow, gorse, guelder-rose, hawthorn, hazel, holly, rowan, scot's pine, sessile oak, silver birch, spindle and sycamore. Eucalyptus have been planted by Forestry England as an experiment.

Idless woods has a diverse range of wildlife, including red deer, roe deer, otter, badger, and water shrew.

The woods are listed in the Domesday Book (1086) as consisting of 40 acres of woodland owned by Alfred of Helstone.

== Cornish wrestling ==
Cornish wrestling tournaments for prizes were held in Idless in the 1800s and 1900s. Venues included the field adjoining the Woodman's Arms.
