= Lake's Pottery =

Lake's Pottery was established in 1872 by William Henry Lake on Chapel Hill Truro Cornwall, though there had been potteries on the site going back to medieval times. The business was acquired by The Dartington Trust in 1973 and after a serious fire in 1975 it closed in 1980. The pottery produced hand-thrown domestic pottery for the local Cornish market including salters, pans, pitchers, ridge tiles, and cloam ovens.

Local clay was used from beneath the meadow next to the pottery, where Bosvigo School now stands.

In the 1920s potter Bernard Leach, sent apprentices to the pottery and it was considered influential in the development of his own style. According to Emmanuel Cooper, Leach initially learnt how to make handles there.

The Wheal Martyn museum holds a collection of their work and Burton at Bideford holds the Reg Lloyd pottery collection which includes Lake's work.
