= Daubuz Moors =

Nature reserve in Cornwall, England

- Interactive map of Daubuz Moors
- Type: Nature reserve
- Location: Moresk Road
- Nearest city: Truro
- Area: 18 acres (7.3 ha)
- Created: 1977
- Operator: Truro City Council

Daubuz Moors is a nature reserve near the centre of Truro, in Cornwall, England.

The land was given to the citizens of Truro in 1977 by the Rev. C. Enys of the Enys Estate to celebrate the Queen's Silver Jubilee and the centenary of the city of Truro. Its 18 acres of former water-meadows are managed by Truro City Council and a team of volunteers to maintain a diversity of habitats including a stream, flower-rich wetlands, wildflower meadows and Cornish hedges.

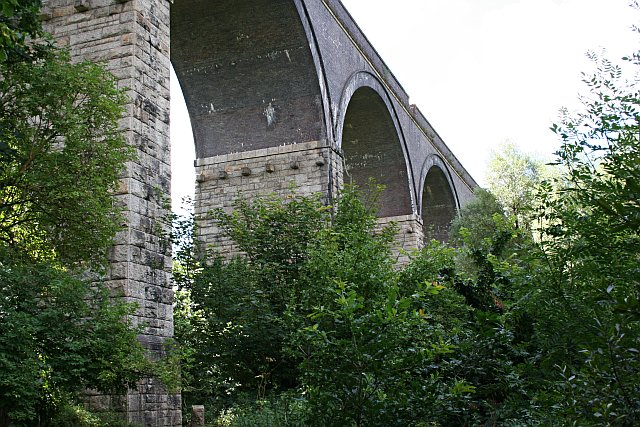
Moresk Viaduct from Daubuz Moors

Daubuz Moors commemorates Lewis Charles Daubuz, a local resident of French Huguenot extraction whose family owned the tin smelters at Carvedras. For many years, the area was grazed by cattle and sheep, but successive generations have also used it for recreation. At its southern end once stood Moresk Mill, which produced flour throughout most of the 19th century. Powered by water, the remains of its leat, millpool and sluices are still evident.

Daubuz Moors western boundary is formed by the River Allen, a tributary of the Truro River. It flows under Moresk railway viaduct at the southern end of the reserve where 14 stone pillars of the original wooden structure stand alongside the replacement stone viaduct.

The name Daubuz is pronounced [dɔbz] and comes from French "D'Aubus".
