= Truro River =

River in Cornwall, England

Coordinates: 50.257°N 5.045°W

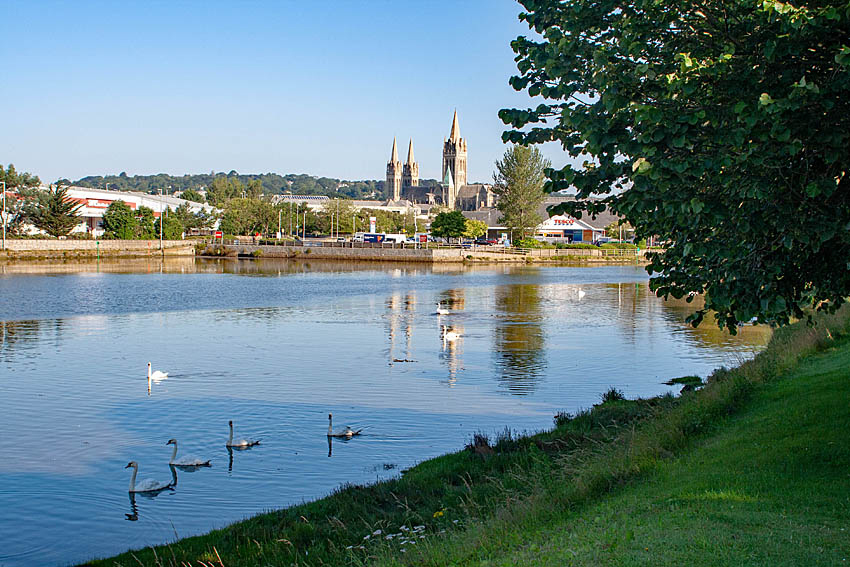
River and cathedral at Truro

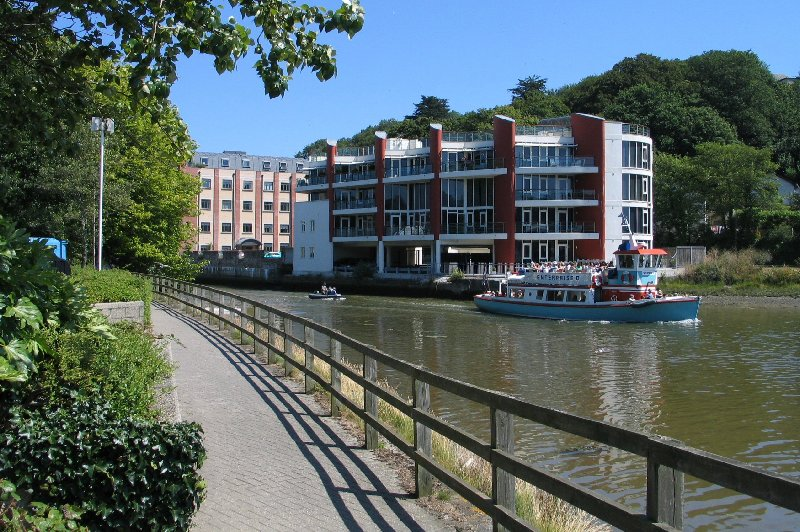
The Truro River with a riverboat

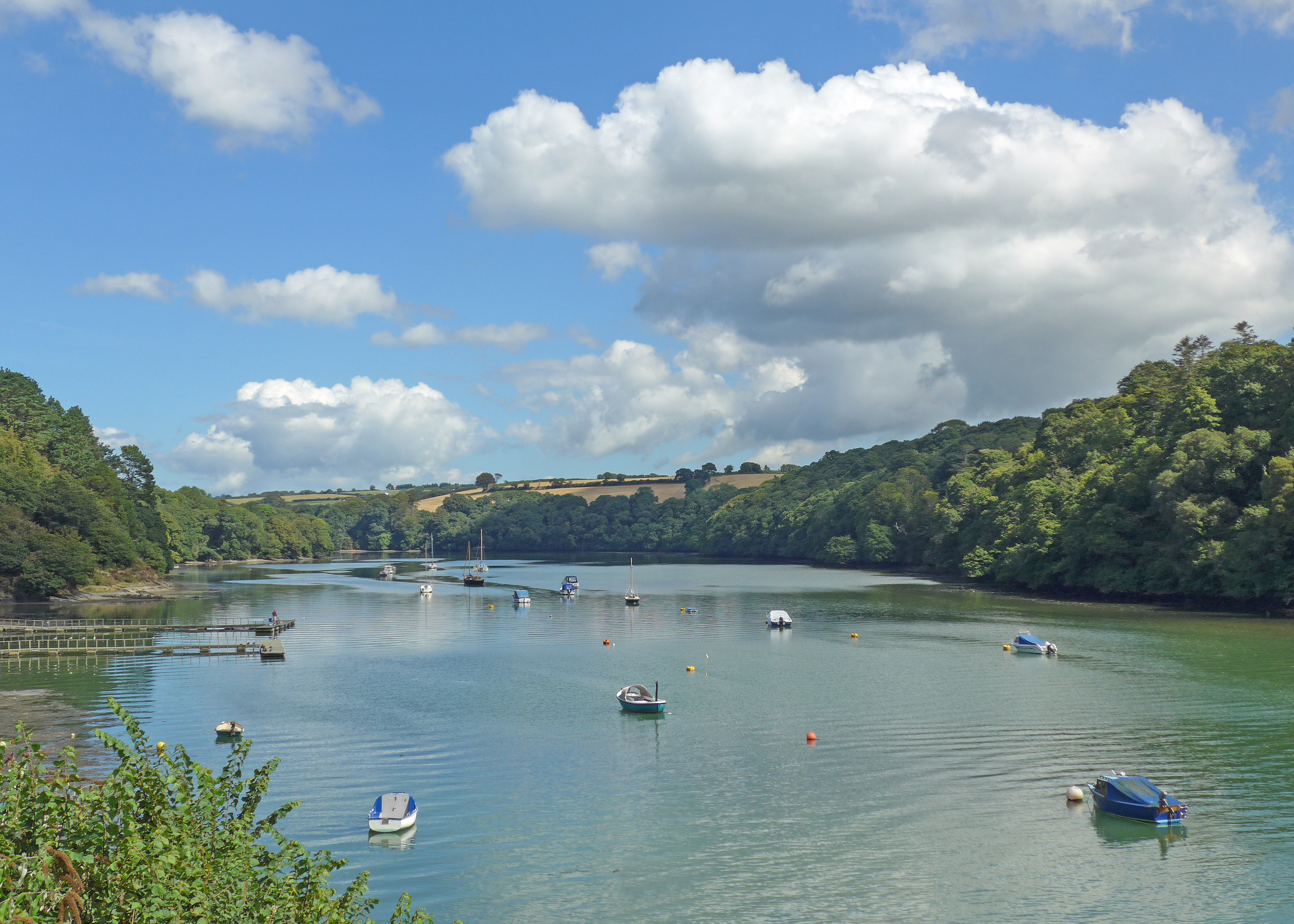
The Tresillian River at Malpas

The Truro River (Cornish: Hyldreth) is a river in the city of Truro in Cornwall, England, UK. It is the product of the convergence of the two rivers named Kenwyn and Allen which run under the city: the Truro River (named after the city) flows into the River Fal, estuarial waters where wildlife is abundant, and then out into the Carrick Roads. The river is navigable up to Truro.

The river valleys form a bowl surrounding the city on the north, east and west and open to the Truro River in the south. The fairly steep-sided bowl in which Truro is located, along with high precipitation swelling the rivers and a spring tide in the River Fal, were major causes of flooding in 1988 which caused large amounts of damage to the city centre. Since then, flood defences have been constructed around the city, including an emergency dam at New Mill on the River Kenwyn and a tidal barrier on the Truro River, to prevent future problems. The valley of the Tresillian River is between the valleys of the Truro River and the Fal; the Tresillian River flows into the Truro River just upstream of where the latter joins the Fal. Early records give the Tresillian River the name "Seugar" (1297) or "Sowgar" (1530); the meaning of this name is unknown.

The river is mentioned in the medieval Cornish language play Bewnans Ke (c. 1550), as the place from which the eponymous Saint Kea embarks for Rosené. It uses the river's Cornish name Hildrech, which in modern spelling is Hyldreth.

== Malpas Estuary ==
The river from the city to the village of Malpas, including Lambe Creek and Calenick Creek, form Malpas Estuary SSSI (Site of Special Scientific Interest). It is an important habitat of tidal mudflats, which are feeding grounds for wildfowl and wading birds as well as fish species including European seabass, thicklip grey mullet, European flounder and European eel. There is also a small run of migratory brown trout (Sea Trout, known in Cornwall as Peel) into the River Allen. The banks of the estuary are also noted for their flora.
