= Joseph Antonio Emidy =

Guinean-born British musician

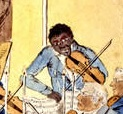
- Born: Guinea
- Died: Truro, Cornwall
- Occupations: Composer, Violinist

Joseph Antonio Emidy (c. 1775 – 23 April 1835) was a Guinean-born British musician who was enslaved by Portuguese traders in his early life. He was later freed and resided in Portugal before being impressed into the Royal Navy. He was eventually discharged near Cornwall and later became a notable and celebrated violinist and composer in the region, dying in 1835.

== Life ==
Born in Guinea, Emidy was sold into slavery as a child to Portuguese traders who took him to Brazil and later to Portugal. In Portugal, he became a virtuoso violinist in the Lisbon Opera. He was press-ganged by sailors under Captain Sir Edward Pellew during the Napoleonic Wars and spent the next four years serving as a ship's fiddler.

== Music ==
Early 19th-century sketch of the Truro Philharmonic Orchestra with Joseph Antonio Emidy

In 1799, Emidy was discharged in Falmouth, Cornwall. In Falmouth, he earned his living as a violinist and a teacher. He became the leader of the Truro Philharmonic Orchestra, and went on to become one of the most celebrated and influential musical figures in early 19th-century Cornwall. He composed many works, including concertos and a symphony, but no known copies survive.

== Personal life ==
In 1802, he married Jane Hutchins, a local tradesman's daughter, and they had eight children. They moved to Truro around 1815.

== Death ==
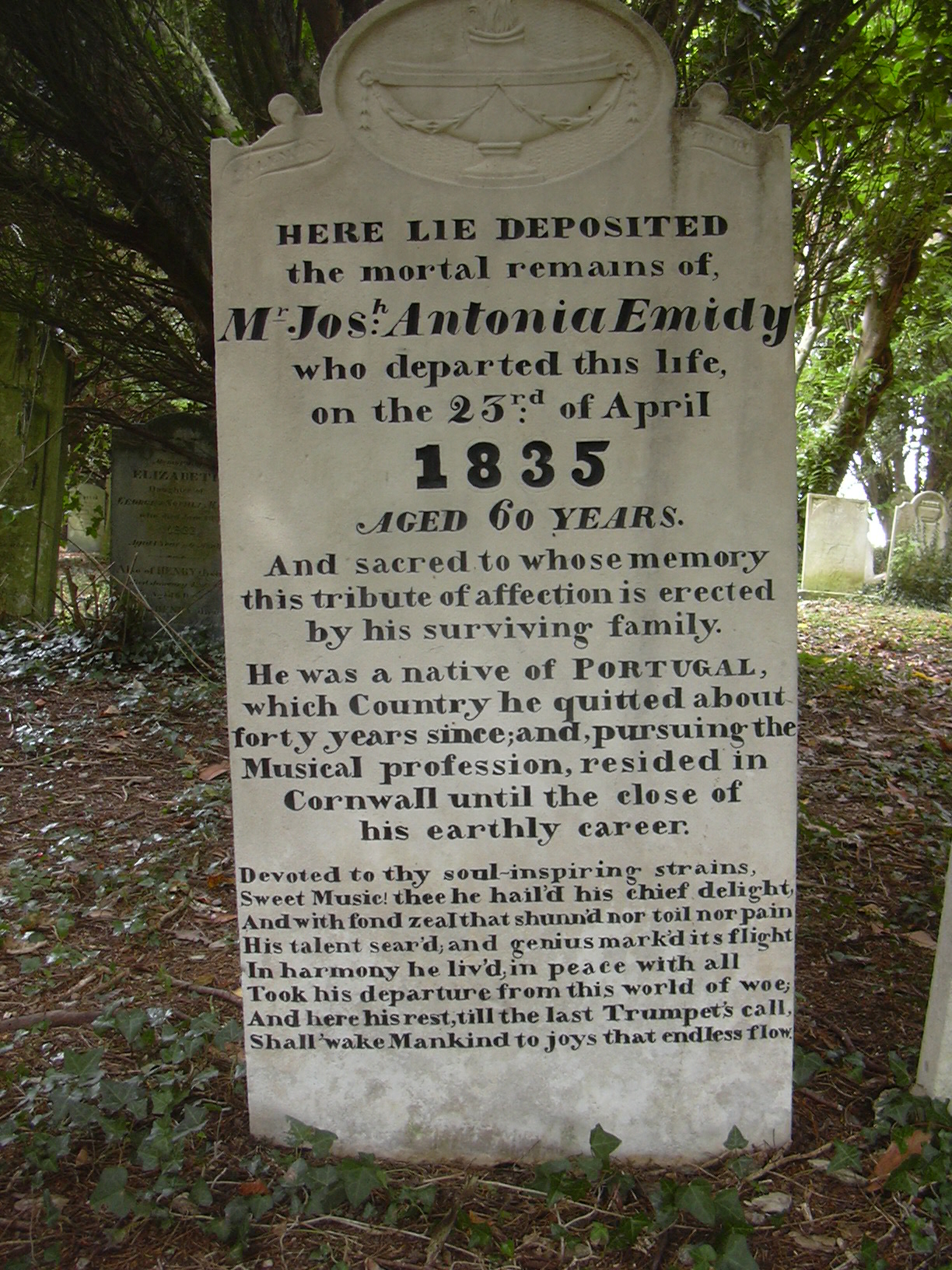
The Gravestone of Joseph Antonio Emidy in Kenwyn Churchyard is Grade II listed

He died in Truro, Cornwall, and his grave is in Kenwyn churchyard.

Transcript of his gravestone reads:

HERE LIE DEPOSITED The mortal remains of Mr Jos:h Antonia Emidy Who departed this life, On the 23:rd of April 1835 AGED 60 YEARS

And sacred to whose memory This tribute of affection is erected By his surviving family.

He was native of PORTUGAL Which country he quit about forty years since and pursuing the Musical Profession, resided in Cornwall until the close of his earthly career.

Devoted to thy soul-inspiring strains, Sweet Music! Thee he hail'd his chief delight And with fond zeal that shunn'd nor toil nor pain His talent sear'd, and genius mark'd its flight In harmony he liv'd, in peace with all Took his departure from this world of woe, And here his rest, till the last Trumpet's call, Shall 'wake mankind to joys that endless flow.

== Tributes ==
On 24 March 2007, during a service at Kenwyn Church to mark the 200th anniversary of the parliamentary abolition of the slave trade throughout the British Empire, the life of Emidy was featured and some typical pieces of music from his time were played in tribute.

Emidy is the subject of a play by Dr Alan M. Kent, The Tin Violin.

In 2015 a carved wooden boss was erected in Truro Cathedral in his memory.

In 2022, the University of Exeter Department of Humanities and Social Sciences, Cornwall at Penryn Campus named the Postgraduate researchers room after him in Peter Lanyon Building.

== See also ==
- Ignatius Sancho a black English composer (1729 - 1780)
- George Bridgetower (1778 - 1860) a black Polish born composer who died in London in 1860
- Samuel Coleridge-Taylor another black English composer (1875-1912)

== Sources ==
- He is mentioned at length (pp. 163–172) in the autobiography of James Silk Buckingham (MP for Sheffield), which was published in 1855.
- [-?-] "My Hero Joseph Emidy", BBC History magazine, October 2001
- Richard McGrady, Music and Musicians in Early Nineteenth Century Cornwall: the world of Joseph Emidy - slave, violinist and composer. Exeter: Exeter University Press, 1991, ISBN 0-85989-359-6
- Richard McGrady, "Emidy, Joseph Antonio (c.1770–1835)", Oxford Dictionary of National Biography, Oxford University Press, 2004; accessed 11 October 2007.
