= River Allen (Truro) =

River in Cornwall, England

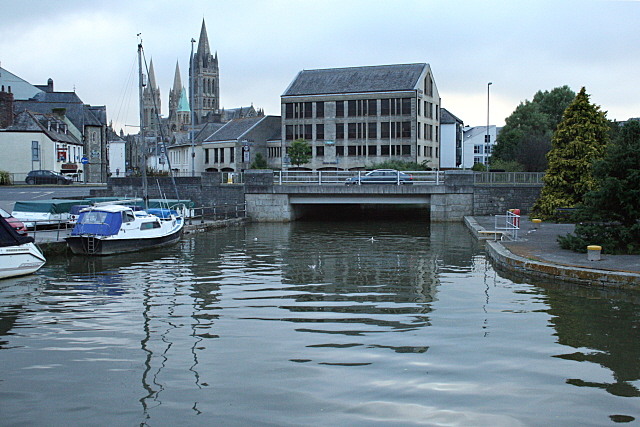
River Allen just before it joins the River Kenwyn

The River Allen (Cornish: Dowr Alyn, meaning shining river), or St Allen River, to the north of Truro is one of two watercourses in Cornwall which share this name.

The River Allen rises at Ventoneage (Cornish: Fentenyk, meaning little spring) north of St Allen and flows southwards through the Idless Valley and Daubuz Moors into Truro. Here it joins the River Kenwyn to form the Truro River.

The river is home to healthy populations of Brown Trout (Salmo trutta), European Eel (Anguilla anguilla), Minnow (Phoxinus phoxinus) and Bullhead (Cottus gobio) also known as the ‘Miller’s Thumb. The lower tidal reaches also hold Bass (Dicentrarchus labrax), Grey Mullet (Chelon labrosus), and Flounder (Platichthys flesus). There is also a small run of Sea Trout (migratory Salmo trutta) into the river.
