= Albert Sherman =

Australian flower painter

Albert Sherman (1882–1971) was a prolific Australian flower painter.

Albert John Sherman was born in Truro, Cornwall, England in 1882, his father Thomas Sherman was a carriage painter.

He lived in Carclew Street Truro and studied at the Central Technical School and the Truro School of Art. Sherman enlisted with the navy and emigrated to Australia, with his wife Ethel in 1922. Sherman was a fellow of the Royal Art Society of New South Wales from 1928.

He had a solo exhibition in Sydney in 1938 and Melbourne in 1939. His work is represented in the collections of the Art Gallery of NSW and the National Art Gallery, regional galleries as well as private collections.

A painting by Sherman titled Still Life with Roses and Mixed Blooms was sold by Sotheby's in 1989 for $30,800.

A book about Sherman’s work, The Flower Paintings of Albert Sherman, in a limited edition of 1,000 copies was published by Angus & Robertson in 1955.

Sherman died on 11 January 1971.
