= Bosvigo School =

- Skol Bosveygow

Location
- Truro, Cornwall, TR1 3BJ; England; 50.2623°N 5.0596°W

Information
- Established: 1898
- Ofsted: Reports
- Headteacher: Chris Wallis
- Gender: mixed
- Website: https://www.bosvigo.cornwall.sch.uk/

Bosvigo School (Cornish: Skol Bosveygow) is a primary, coeducational English-language school for boys and girls aged from 4 to 11 in Chapel Hill, Truro Cornwall, UK rated “good”, by Ofsted in 2007, 2018 and 2022. 315 children attend the school and are arranged into 11 classes. It falls under the local authority of Cornwall and the head is Chris Wallis. In 2020 it was listed as one of 48 primary schools in Cornwall that were over-subscribed.

Log books, minutes and paper records from 1863 to 1940 are held by Kresen Kernow.

== Notable pupils ==
- Roger Taylor, English musician, singer, songwriter, multi-instrumentalist and the drummer for the rock band Queen.
- David Penhaligon, Liberal Member of Parliament for the constituency of Truro from 1974 to 1986.
