= Charles William Hempel =

English organist

Charles William Hempel (1777–1855) was an English organist.

== Life ==
Hempel was born at Chelsea, Middlesex, on 28 August 1777, and showing very early indications of musical talent was placed under the tuition of his relative, Augustus F. C. Kollmann, organist and composer. He made rapid progress, and at the age of eight performed during the service at the king's German chapel, St. James's. He was placed later at a boarding-school in Surrey, where all his leisure time was devoted to music and drawing. In 1793–4 he was on the continent, chiefly at Leipzig and Dresden, where he cultivated his taste for music.

Not finding employment in London, he removed to Truro in Cornwall, where in May 1804 he was elected organist of St. Mary's Church (which later became Truro Cathedral). He held this post for forty years, supplementing his income by teaching music. In 1805 he composed and printed Psalms from the New Version for the use of the Congregation of St. Mary's, and in 1812 Sacred Melodies for the same congregation. These melodies became very popular, and some of them are still found in musical collections. A Morning and Evening Service, twenty Original Melodies, and two Anthems, dedicated to the Hon. George Pelham, bishop of Lincoln, was published in 1820. For the use of his pupils in 1822 he printed an Introduction to the Pianoforte, comprising Elementary Instruction, with a series of Practical Lessons.

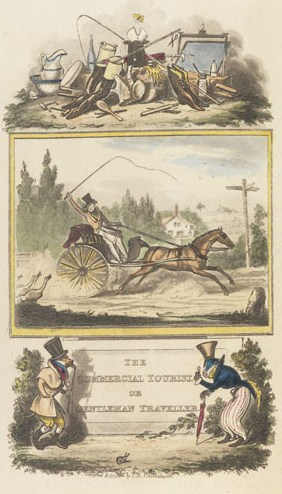
Illustration for The Commercial Tourist, or Gentleman Traveller by Hempel, engraver Isaac Robert Cruikshank

Hempel also became known as a poet in 1822 by his work entitled The Commercial Tourist, or Gentleman Traveller, a satirical poem in four cantos. This book was embellished with coloured engravings designed and etched by J. R. Cruikshank, and in 1832 went to a third edition.

In his later life he moved to Exeter, where he made an improvident second marriage. His death is involved in some obscurity. The West Briton states that he died at his son's residence, Wolsingham Place, Kennington Road, London, on 14 March 1855; but a more trustworthy source, the registrar-general's return, says that after acting as a banker's clerk he died in the workhouse, Prince's Road, Lambeth, London, on 14 March 1855. His eldest son was Charles or Carl Frederick Hempel.
