= Kenwyn =

Suburb of Truro, Cornwall, England

Coordinates: 50°16′N 5°04′W

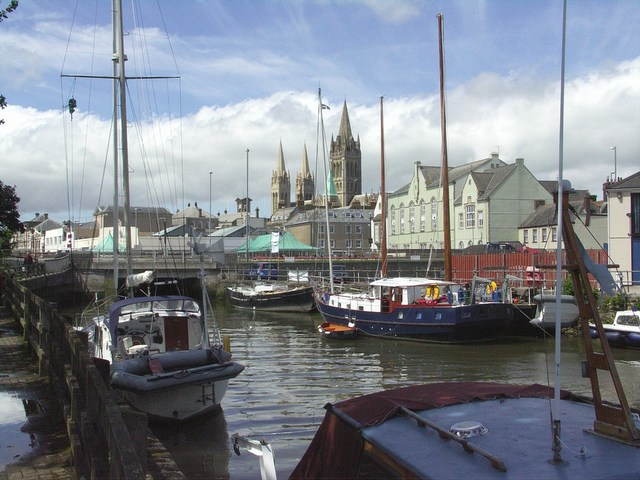
The River Kenwyn, which converges with the Allen and becomes the River Truro

Kenwyn (Cornish: Keynwynn) is a settlement and civil parish in Cornwall, England, United Kingdom. Kenwyn was an ancient parish based on the settlement of Kenwyn, which lies just north of Truro, between the rivers River Allen and Kenwyn. But the parish also covered extensive rural areas, particularly to the west and north-west of Truro. The parish of Kenwyn was split in 1894 into separate civil parishes for the part within the borough boundaries of Truro, which included the settlement of Kenwyn, and the part of the old parish outside the borough. That split continues to this day; the settlement of Kenwyn is now a suburb of Truro and forms part of the civil parish of Truro, whereas Kenwyn civil parish excludes the settlement of Kenwyn it is named after and instead covers the rural areas to the west and north-west of the city. Kenwyn gives its name to one of three rivers that flow through the city.

The main settlements in the civil parish are the villages of Threemilestone and Shortlanesend, along with several hamlets including Allet, Greenbottom and Idless. The population of the parish at the 2021 census was 7,198.

== History and toponymy ==
Kenwyn River is mentioned in Ptolemy's Geography as Κενίωνος ποταμóς (Kenionos potamos, Latin Cenionus fluvius). It is likely that the church of Kenwyn was the mother church of Truro. Some people think that the original dedication was St Keyne, but the earliest form of the name, for the homonymous river, had been mentioned some centuries before the life of the holy women. By the 15th century, it was assumed to be St. Kenwyn, though no medieval records record it with the prefix 'Saint'. Subsequently, the dedication was attributed to St. Cuby.

The manor of Kenwyn was held in the 12th century by Richard de Luci, after it had been confiscated by the King. Apparently, the borough of Truro was established by the lord in part of the manor and this was the beginning of Truro as a town, then called Triuereu. In the Domesday Book the manor of Kenwyn appears as Tregavran (in later usage Trehaverne). It was in the possession of the families of Lantyan, Beville, Grenville, and Enys, for many centuries.

The earliest form of the name is Keynwen (1259), which comes from the Cornish words keyn "ridge" and gwynn "white". The modern Cornish form is spelled Keynwynn.

Arthur Langdon (1896) describes a Cornish cross in the manor house grounds at Eastbourne, Sussex, which was originally at Kenwyn. Davies Gilbert, a former resident of the manor house, removed it from a roadside gate west of Truro where it was in use as a gatepost and had it transported to Eastbourne in 1817. The shaft is ornamented on all four sides.

=== Administrative history ===
Kenwyn was an ancient parish in the Powder Hundred of Cornwall. The south-eastern part of the parish, including the settlement of Kenwyn itself and the parish church, was included within the ancient borough boundaries of Truro. Further parts of Kenwyn parish to the south-west of Truro were brought within the Truro parliamentary borough (constituency) in 1832, and the municipal borough boundaries were adjusted to match the constituency in 1836.

The Local Government Act 1894 directed that civil parishes were no longer allowed to straddle borough boundaries. The old parish of Kenwyn was therefore split into a Kenwyn Urban parish covering the areas within the borough of Truro, and a Kenwyn Rural parish covering the parts of the old parish outside the borough. In 1934, Kenwyn Urban parish was abolished, when the parishes within the borough were united into a single Truro parish matching the borough. As part of the same reforms in 1934, Kenwyn Rural parish absorbed the small neighbouring parish of Tregavethan, and was renamed Kenwyn (despite excluding the namesake settlement).

== Notable buildings ==
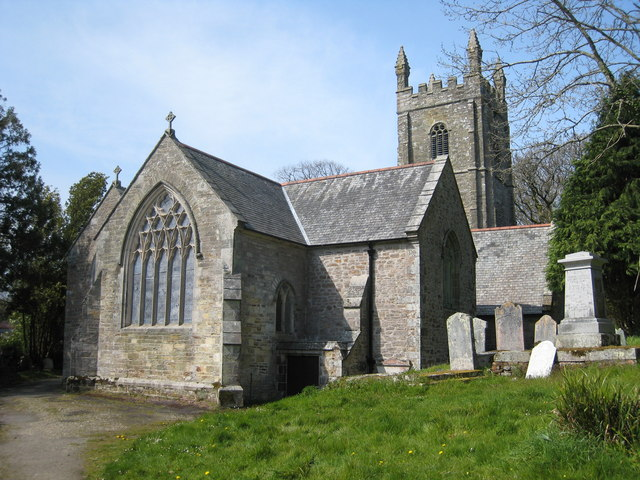
Kenwyn Parish Church

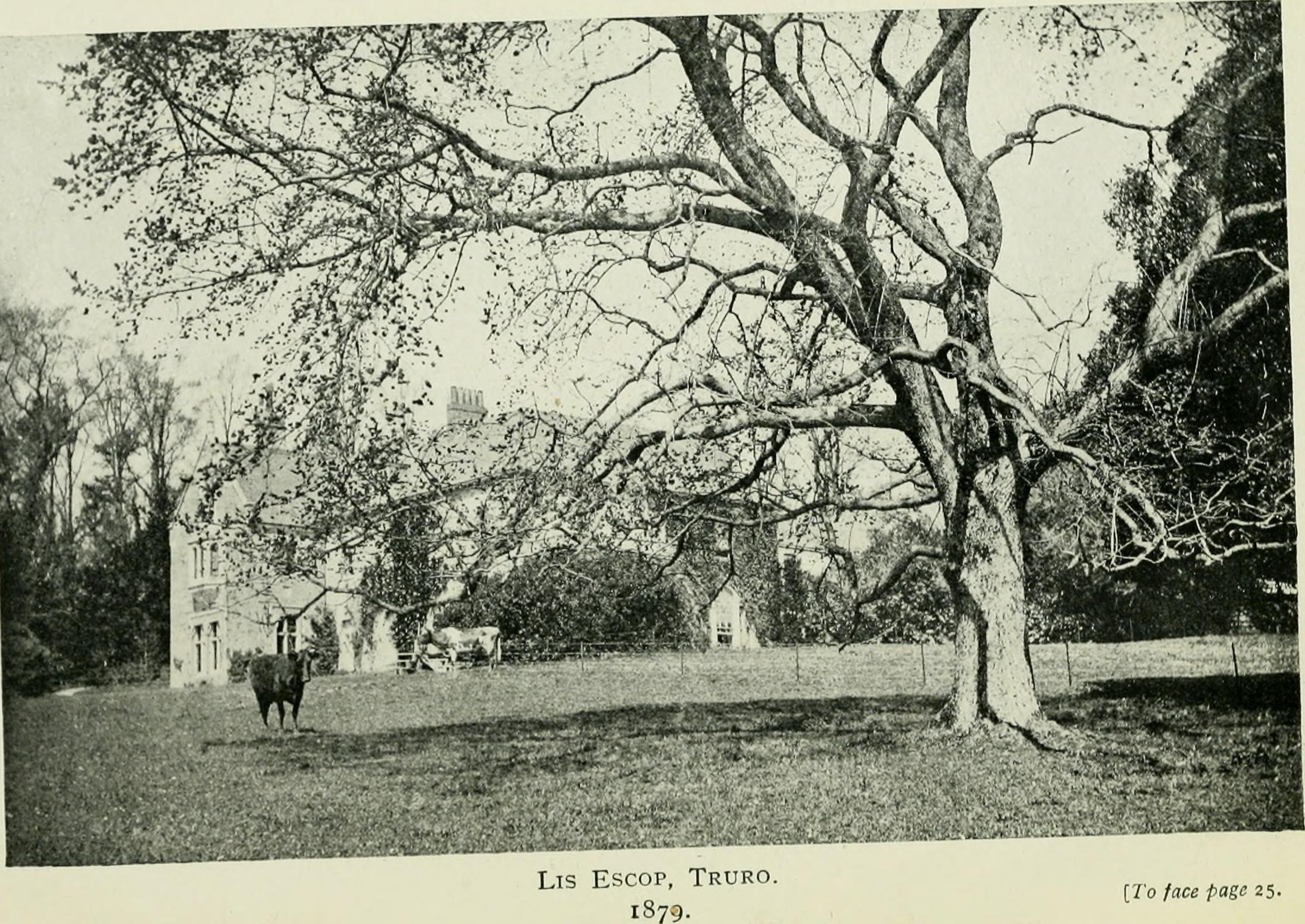
Lis Escop, 1879

Kenwyn parish church dates to the 14th or 15th century, with the south aisle and tower dating to the 15th century. Restorations from 1820 to 1862 have reduced the interior to its present state. There is a peal of eight bells. The churchyard provides a fine view over the city of Truro and above the lychgate is an upper chamber (probably a schoolroom). On 24 March 2007, during a service at the church to mark the 200th anniversary of the parliamentary abolition of the slave trade throughout the British Empire, the life of Joseph Antonio Emidy was featured and some typical pieces of music from his time were played in tribute.

Lis Escop (the Kenwyn vicarage of 1780) became after the establishment of the Diocese of Truro the bishop's palace. For some years it housed part of Truro Cathedral School, which closed in 1981. It then housed the Community of the Epiphany (Anglican nuns) and is now, as Epiphany House, a Christian retreat and conference centre.

The Kenwyn building at Truro College is named after the River Kenwyn.

== Cornish wrestling ==
Cornish wrestling tournaments, for prizes including gold laced hats, were held in Kenwyn in the 1800s.

== Notable residents ==
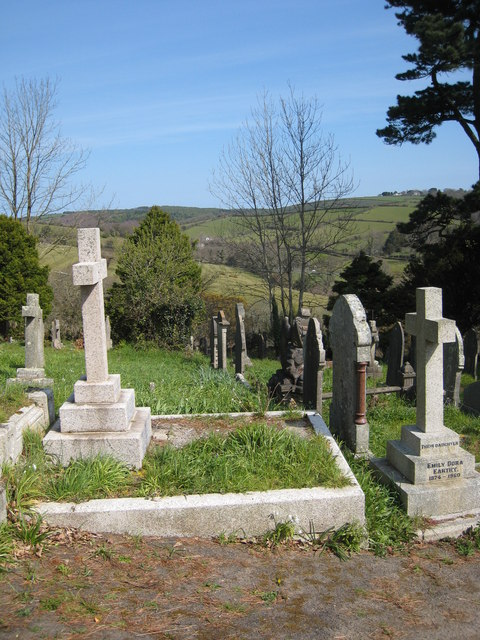
Looking up the Allen valley from Kenwyn cemetery

- Paul Robins (1804–1890), a Bible Christian pioneer in Canada
- Joseph Antonio Emidy (1775–1835), composer and former slave, is buried here
- Charles Foster Barham (1804–1884), physician and antiquarian, is buried here
- Edward Harold Browne (1811–1891), Bishop of Winchester, was Vicar of Kenwyn from 1849 to 1857
- John Rundle Cornish (1837–1918), Bishop of St Germans, was Vicar of Kenwyn
- Conrad Meyer (1922–2011), Bishop of Dorchester, was Vicar of Kenwyn
