= Charles Frederick Hempel =

English organist and composer

Charles Frederick Hempel (1811–1867) was an organist and composer.

Hempel, eldest son of Charles William Hempel, was born at Truro, Cornwall, in September 1811. Having under his father's care received a sound musical education, he became a teacher of music at Truro. In 1847 he began writing and publishing songs, the first being dedicated to the Countess of Falmouth and entitled "Heave one sigh for me at parting". He also composed and printed pianoforte and dance music. About 1844 he succeeded his father as organist of St. Mary's Church, Truro (which later became Truro Cathedral). He was one of the first to introduce into Cornwall choral performances on a large scale.

On 11 February 1855 he matriculated from Magdalen Hall, Oxford, and on the 15th of the same month took the degree of bachelor in music. On 19 March 1862 "The Seventh Seal", his oratorio for the degree of doctor of music, was performed in the Sheldonian Theatre, and he received his degree the next day. Four pieces from this oratorio were printed 1864–6, and the author was busy preparing the complete work for the press at the time of his death.

He was an unwearied student of music, but devoted himself more to the theory than to the practice of his art. In 1857 he became organist and choir-master to St. John's Episcopal Church at Perth. He was conductor of the Perth Choral Union and of the Euterpean Society. He also continued his teaching and composed many pieces of light music.

He died at Perth of congestion of the lungs, on 25 April 1867.
