= Truro =

Cathedral city in Cornwall, England

Coordinates: 50.260°N 5.051°W

Truro: Cornish: Truru
- City
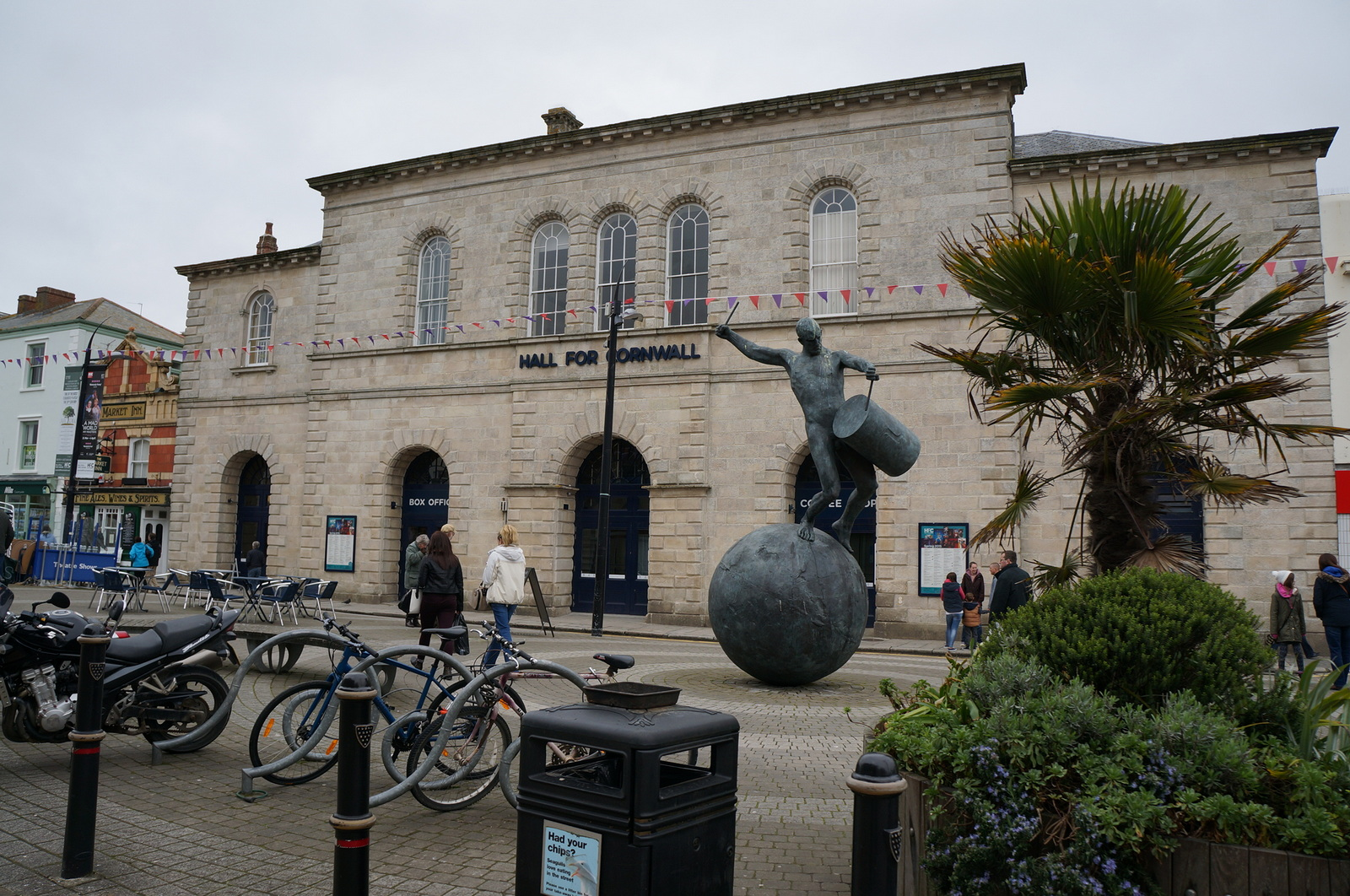
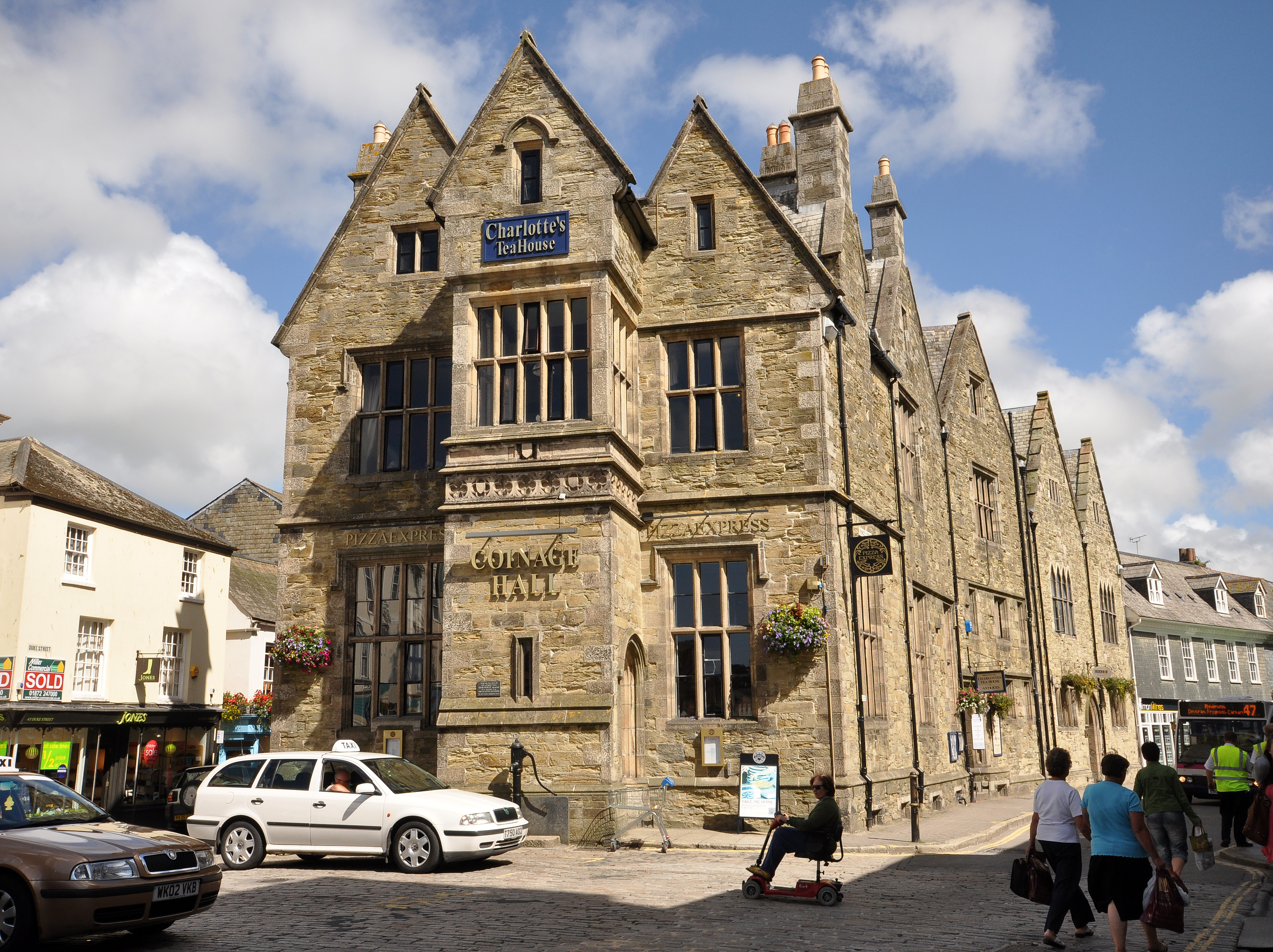
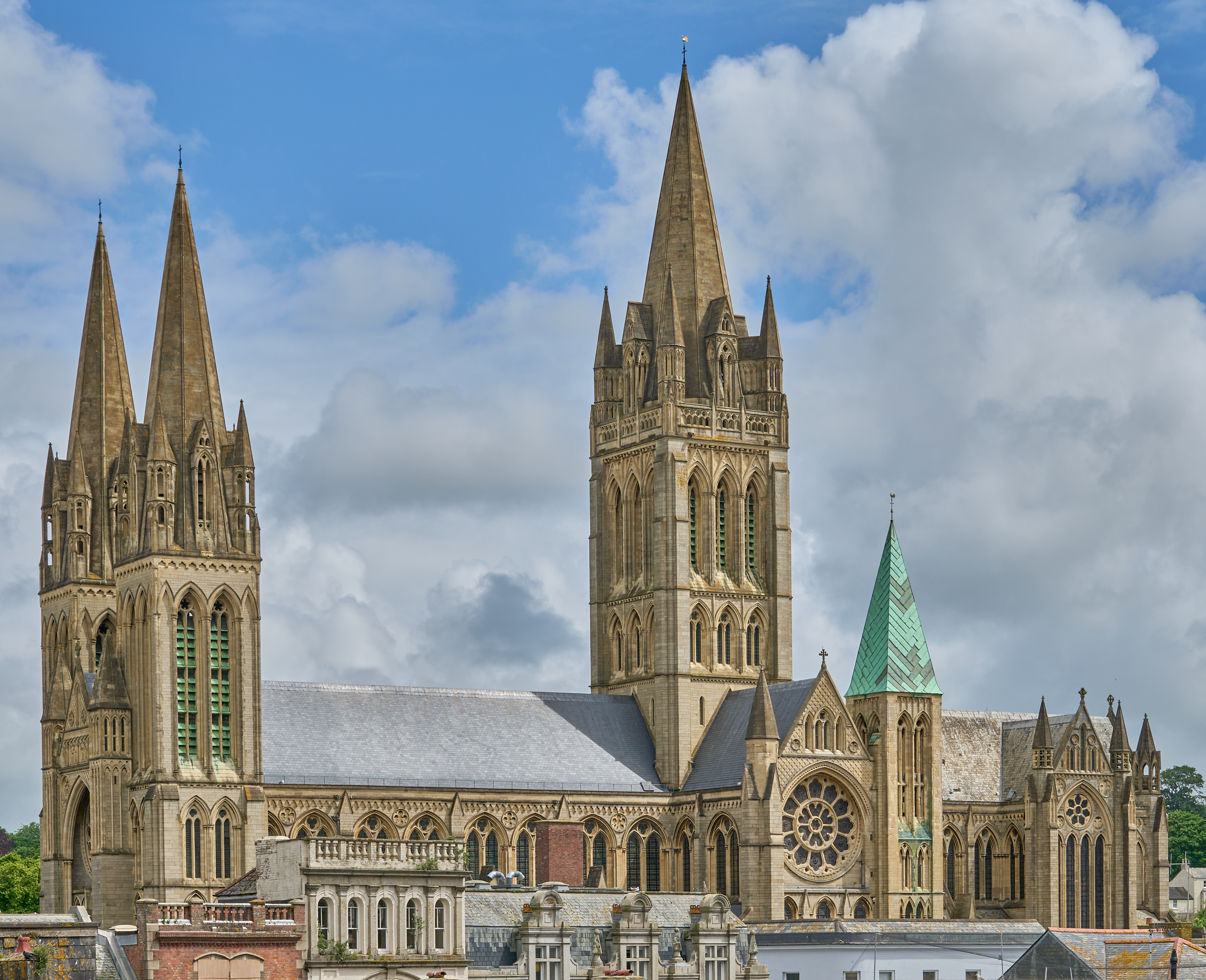
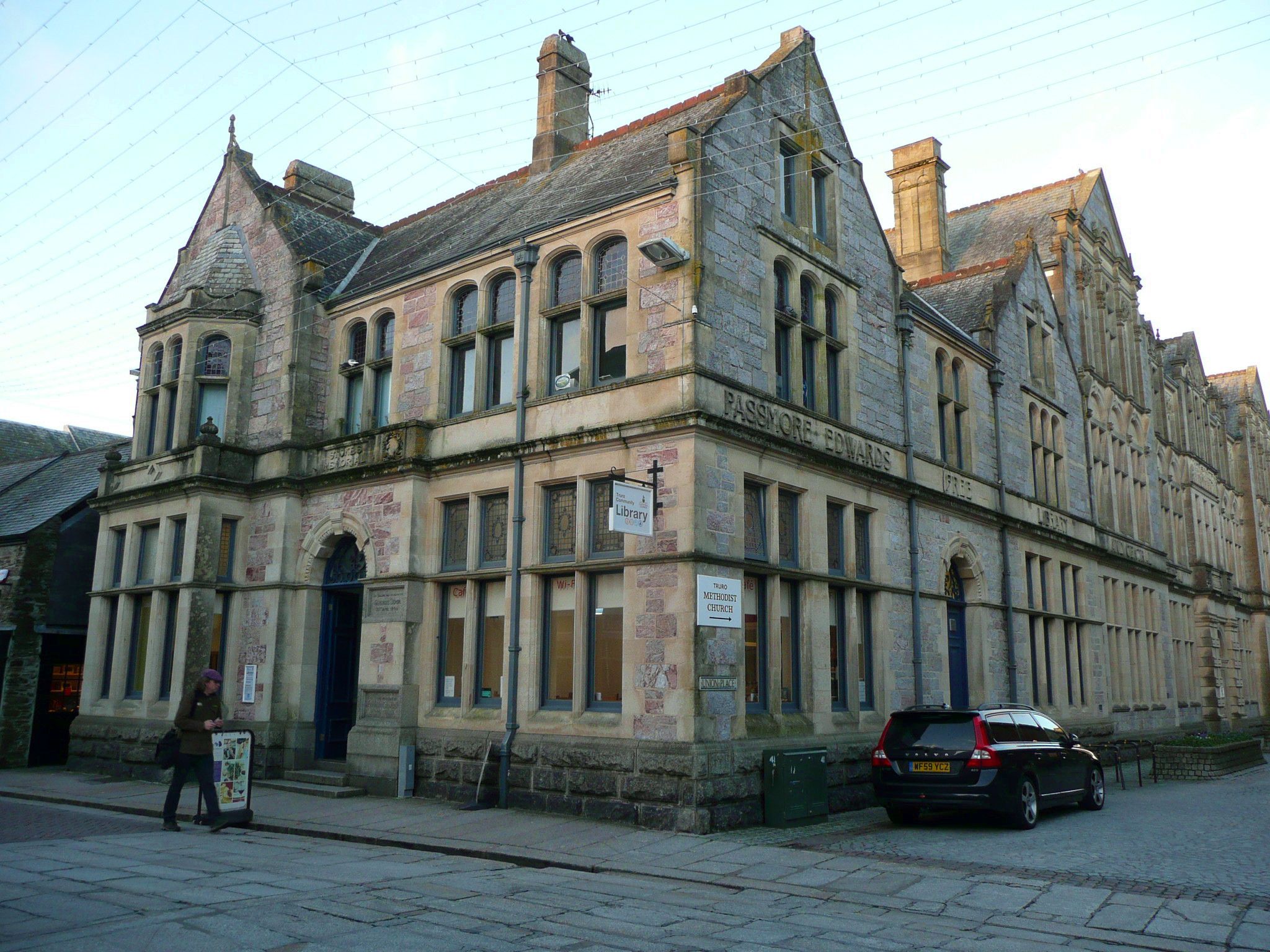
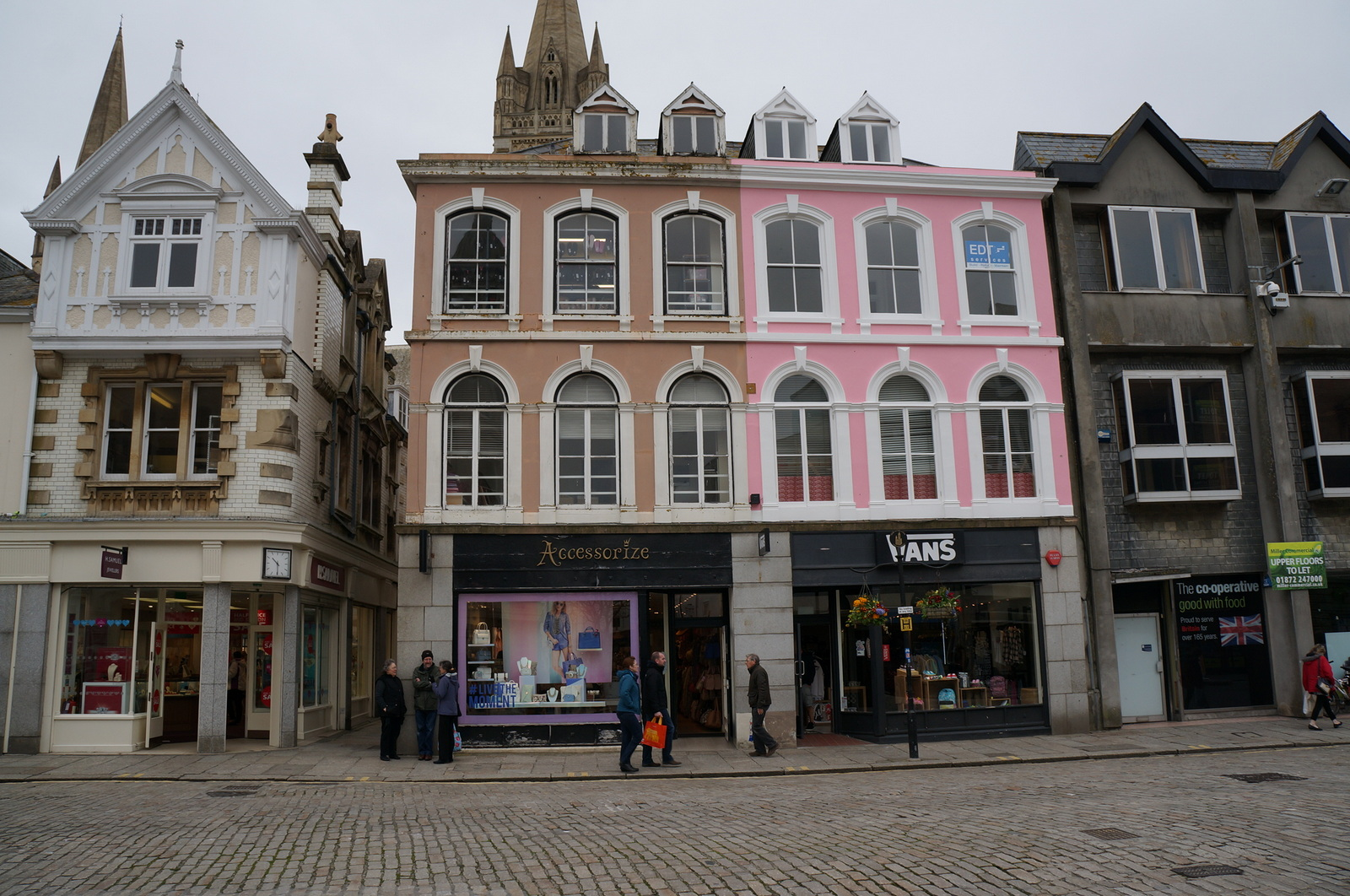
- Hall for Cornwall Coinage Hall Truro Cathedral Truro Library Boscawen Street

- Location within Cornwall
- Interactive map of Truro
- Population: 21,046 (Parish, 2021) (Note: To get individual parish data, use the query function on table PP002.); 23,060 (Built up area, 2021)
- Demonym: Truronians
- OS grid reference: SW825448
  - London: 232 miles (373 km) ENE
- Civil parish: Truro
- Unitary authority: Cornwall
- Ceremonial county: Cornwall
- Region: South West
- Country: England
- Sovereign state: United Kingdom
- Post town: TRURO
- Postcode district: TR1-4
- Dialling code: 01872
- Police: Devon and Cornwall
- Fire: Cornwall
- Ambulance: South Western
- UK Parliament: Truro and Falmouth
- Website: truro.gov.uk

Truro (/ˈtrʊəroʊ/; Cornish: Truru [ˈtrʏryː]) is a cathedral city and civil parish in Cornwall, England. It is the southernmost city in the United Kingdom and lies 232 miles (373 km) west-south-west of London. It is Cornwall's county town, only city and a centre for administration, leisure and shopping. At the 2021 census the population of the parish was 21,046 and that of the built-up area was 23,060, as defined by the Office for National Statistics, which included the Gloweth and Treliske areas in the neighbouring parish of Kenwyn.

Truro grew as a trade centre through its port and as a stannary town for tin mining. It was awarded city status in 1877, following the creation of the Diocese of Truro in the previous year. Truro Cathedral was built between 1880 and 1910. The city is home to Cornwall Council, the Cornwall Museum and Art Gallery, the Hall for Cornwall and the county's Courts of Justice.

== Toponymy ==
Truro's name may derive from the Cornish tri-veru meaning "three rivers", but authorities such as the Oxford Dictionary of English Place Names have doubts about the "tru" meaning "three". An expert on Cornish place-names, Oliver Padel, in A Popular Dictionary of Cornish Place-names, called the "three rivers" meaning "possible". Alternatively the name may come from tre-rhwïereu "the town on the rivers", tre-vur "the town on the (Roman) road", tri-ru "three streets", or tre-uro or similar, i.e. settlement on the river Uro.

== History ==
A castle was built in the 12th century by Richard de Luci, Chief Justice of England in the reign of Henry II who, for court services, was granted land in Cornwall, including the area round the confluence of the two rivers. The town grew below the castle and gained borough status from further economic activity. The castle has long disappeared.

Richard de Lucy fought in Cornwall under Count Alan of Brittany, after leaving Falaise late in 1138. The small adulterine castle at Truro, Cornwall, originally the parish of Kenwyn, later known as "Castellum de Guelon", was probably built by him in 1139–1140. He styled himself "Richard de Lucy, de Trivereu". The castle passed to Reginald FitzRoy, an illegitimate son of Henry I, when he was invested by King Stephen as the first Earl of Cornwall. Reginald married Mabel FitzRichard, daughter of William FitzRichard, a major landholder in Cornwall. The 75-foot (23 m)-diameter castle was in ruins by 1270 and the motte was levelled in 1840. Today Truro Crown Court stands on the site. In a charter of about 1170, Reginald FitzRoy confirmed to Truro's burgesses the privileges granted by Richard de Lucy. Richard held ten knights' fees in Cornwall before 1135. At his death, the county still accounted for a third of his considerable total holding.

By the early 14th century, Truro was a major port, due to an inland location away from invaders, to prosperity from the fishing industry, and to a role as a stannary town for assaying and stamping tin and copper from Cornish mines. The Black Death brought a trade recession and an exodus that left the town in a very neglected state. Trade and prosperity gradually returned in the Tudor period. Local government came in 1589, with a new charter of Elizabeth I giving it an elected mayor and control over the port of Falmouth.

During the Civil War in the 17th century, Truro raised a sizeable force to fight for the king and a royalist mint was set up. Defeat by Parliamentary troops came after the Battle of Naseby in 1646, when the victorious General Fairfax led his army south-west to relieve Taunton and capture the Royalist-held West Country. The Royalist forces surrendered at Truro while leading Royalist commanders, including Lord Hopton, the Prince of Wales, Sir Edward Hyde, and Lord Capell, fled to Jersey from Falmouth.

Later in the century, Falmouth gained its own charter, giving rights to its harbour and starting a long rivalry with Truro. The dispute was settled in 1709 with control of the River Fal divided between them. The arms of Truro city are "Gules the base wavy of six Argent and Azure, thereon an ancient ship of three masts under sail, on each topmast a banner of St George, on the waves in base two fishes of the second."

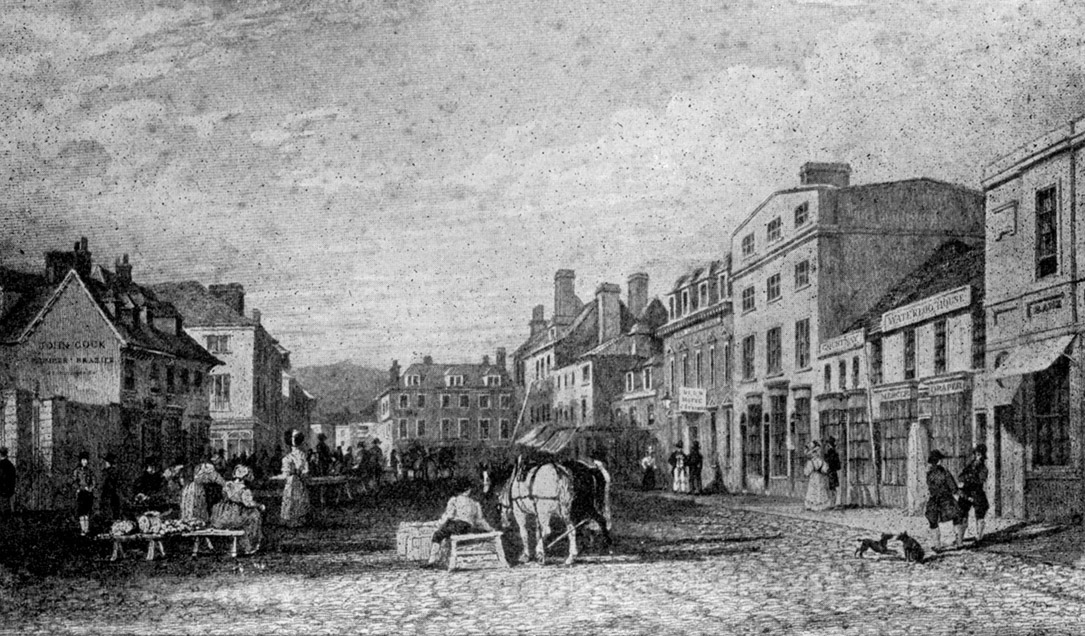
Boscawen Street in 1810

Truro prospered in the 18th and 19th centuries through improved mining methods and higher prices for tin, and its consequent attraction to wealthy mine-owners. Elegant Georgian and Victorian townhouses of the period can be seen today in Lemon Street, named after the mining magnate and local Member of Parliament Sir William Lemon. Truro became the centre for county society, even dubbed "the London of Cornwall".

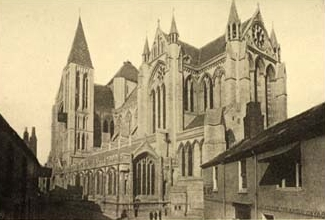
The cathedral in 1905, before completion of the spires

Through those prosperous times, Truro remained a social centre. Among the many notables were Richard Lander, the first European explorer to reach the mouth of the River Niger in Africa and was awarded the first gold medal of the Royal Geographical Society; Henry Martyn, who read mathematics at Cambridge, was ordained and became a missionary, translating the New Testament into Urdu and Persian. Others include Humphry Davy, educated in Truro and the inventor of the miner's safety lamp, and Samuel Foote, an actor and playwright from Boscawen Street.

Truro's importance increased later in the 19th century with an iron-smelting works, potteries and tanneries. From the 1860s, the Great Western Railway provided a direct link to London Paddington. The Bishopric of Truro Act 1876 gave the town a bishop and later a cathedral. In 1877 it gained city status. The New Bridge Street drill hall was completed in the late 19th century.

Truro was connected to the electric telegraph network in 1863, when the Electric and International Telegraph Company opened stations at Truro, Redruth, Penzance, Camborne, Liskard and St Austell.

== Geography ==
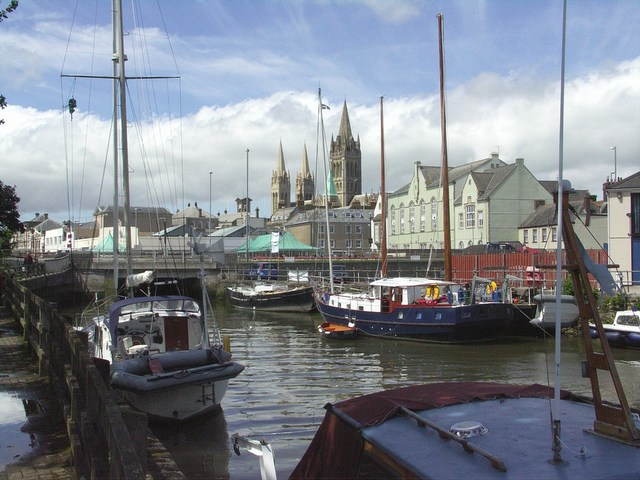
River Kenwyn which converges with the Allen to become the river Truro

Truro lies in the centre of western Cornwall, about 9 miles (14 kilometres) from the south coast, at the confluence of the rivers Kenwyn and Allen, which combine as the Truro River – one of a series of waterways and drowned valleys leading into the river Fal and then the large natural harbour of Carrick Roads. The valleys form a steep bowl surrounding the city on the north, east and west, open to the Truro river in the south. This shape, along with high precipitation that swells the rivers and a spring tide in the River Fal, were major factors in the 1988 floods that seriously damaged the city centre. Since then, flood defences have been constructed, including an emergency dam at New Mill on the river Kenwyn and a tidal barrier on the Truro river.

The city is amidst several protected natural areas, such as the historic parklands at Pencalenick and areas of ornamental landscape such as Trelissick Garden and Tregothnan down the Truro river. An area south-east of the city, including Calenick Creek, has been included in the Cornwall National Landscape. Other protected zones include an Area of Great Landscape Value comprising farmland and wooded valleys to the north east, and Daubuz Moors, a local nature reserve by the river Allen, close to the city centre.

Truro has mainly grown and developed round the historic city centre in a nuclear fashion along the slopes of the bowl valley, except for fast linear development along the A390 to the west, towards Threemilestone. As Truro grew, it encompassed other settlements as suburbs or districts, including Kenwyn and Moresk to the north, Trelander to the east, Newham to the south, and Highertown, Treliske and Gloweth to the west.

=== Climate ===
The Truro area, like the rest of Cornwall, has an oceanic climate. This means fewer extremes in temperature than elsewhere in England, marked by high rainfall, cool summers and mild winters with infrequent frosts.

== Demography and economy ==
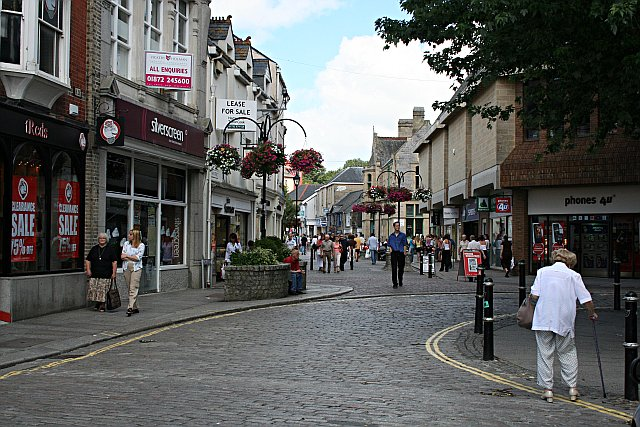
Sunday morning on Pydar Street

The Truro urban area, including parts of surrounding parishes, had a 2001 census population of 18,051. By 2011 the population, including Threemilestone, was 20,044. As of 2021, there are 23,047 residents. Its status as the county's prime destination for retail and leisure and administration is unusual in that it is only its fourth most populous settlement. Indeed, population growth at 10.5% between 1971 and 1998 was slow compared with other Cornish towns and Cornwall. This trend changed significantly in the 21st century, as Truro became one of the fastest growing connurbations in Cornwall, Truro experienced a year-on-year growth rate of 1.31%, compared to 0.68% for Cornwall.

Truro is notable for having one of the youngest average residents in Cornwall, with 77.7% aged under 65. 2,773 people (13.4% of the residents) specified a Cornish only identity and 335 (1.6%) Cornish in combination with British - which is consistent the rest of Cornwall (14% and 1.6% respectively). 3,168 households (33.6% of residents) are experiencing deprivation, and 4,744 (20.5%) are retirees.

Major employers include the Royal Cornwall Hospital, Cornwall Council and Truro College. There are about 22,000 jobs available in Truro, but only 9,500 economically active people living there, which make commuting a major factor in its traffic congestion. Average earnings are higher than elsewhere in Cornwall.

== Governance ==
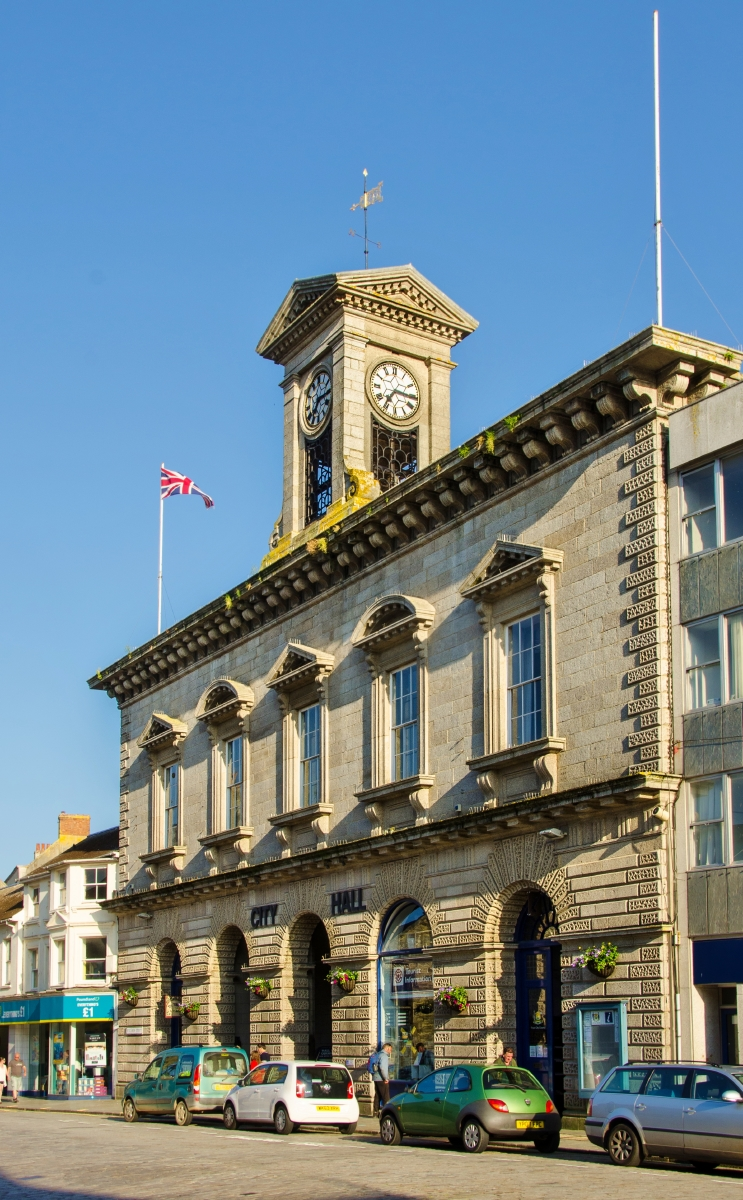
The Hall for Cornwall, which houses a theatre and the headquarters of Truro City Council

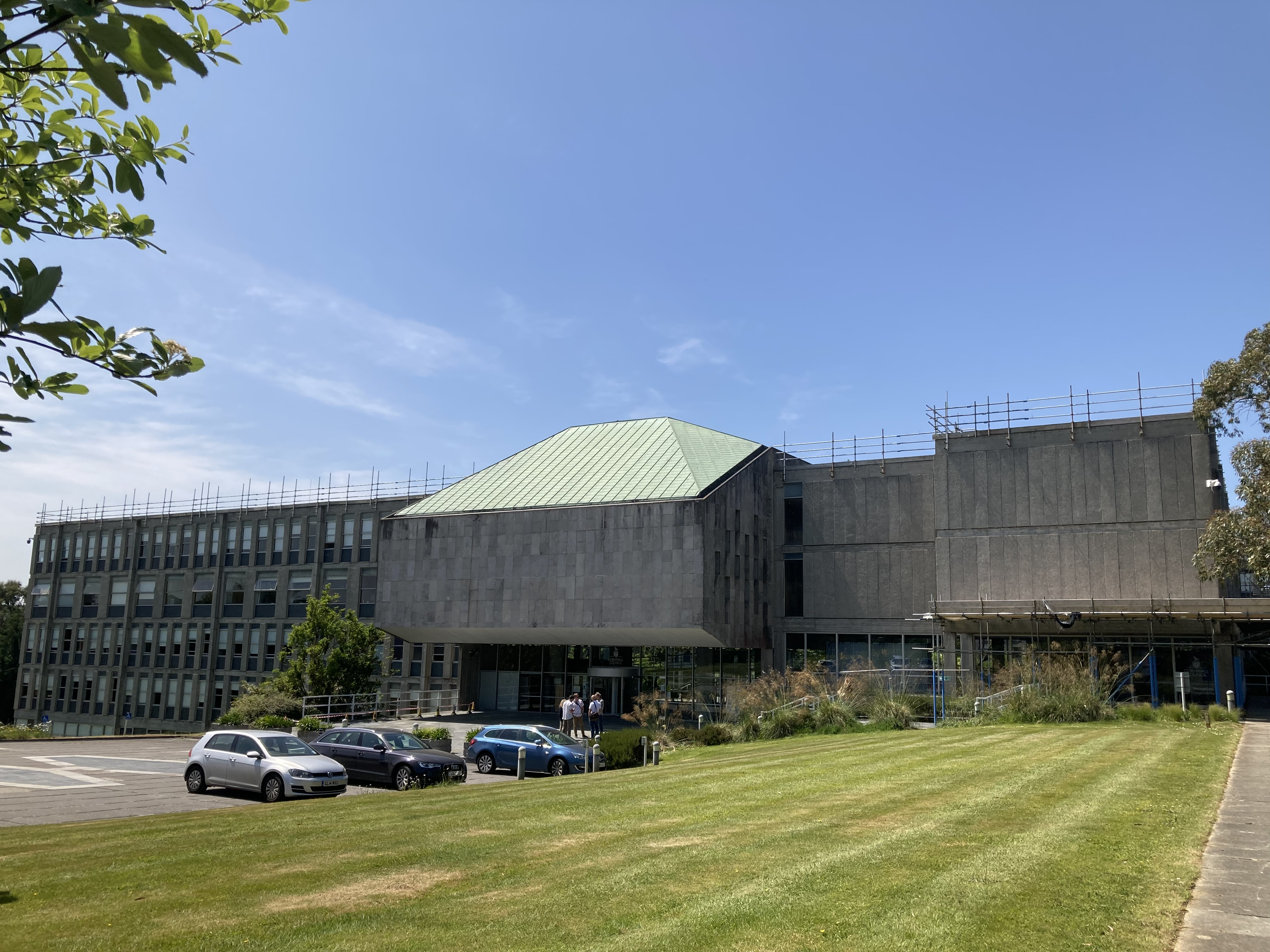
Lys Kernow: Headquarters of Cornwall Council

There are two tiers of local government covering Truro, at parish (city) and unitary authority level: Truro City Council and Cornwall Council. The city council is based at the Municipal Buildings on Boscawen Street, also known as City Hall. The Municipal Buildings form part of the Hall for Cornwall building (built 1846), which also houses a theatre. Cornwall Council is also based in Truro, having its headquarters at Lys Kernow on Treyew Road.

=== Administrative history ===
Truro was an ancient borough. It is unclear when it first became a borough; its earliest known charter was issued around 1166 by Reginald de Dunstanville, Earl of Cornwall. (Note: The charter from Reginald is not dated, but later authorities have deduced from the names of the charter's witnesses that it must have been issued around 1166.) From 1295, the town also formed the Truro parliamentary borough. (Note: Now known as a parliamentary constituency.) The borough was formally incorporated under a subsequent charter from Elizabeth I in 1589, establishing a governing body led by a mayor.

The borough boundary initially covered the parish of Truro St Mary and parts of the neighbouring parishes of St Clement and Kenwyn, including Kenwyn village. In 1832, the constituency was enlarged to take in additional areas from both St Clement and Kenwyn parishes. The borough was reformed to become a municipal borough in 1836, under the Municipal Corporations Act 1835, which standardised how most boroughs operated across the country. The municipal boundaries were enlarged to match the constituency as part of the same reforms. The 1836 reforms also gave Truro responsibility for policing in the borough, leading to the creation of the Truro Borough Police, renamed Truro City Police in 1877. The force was merged into Cornwall County Constabulary in 1921.

The Diocese of Truro was established in 1876. The borough council then petitioned Queen Victoria to grant city status to Truro, which was granted by letters patent dated 28 August 1877. The borough boundaries were enlarged again in 1934, taking in areas east and west of the city.

The borough of Truro was abolished in 1974 under the Local Government Act 1972, when the area became part of the Carrick district. A successor parish called Truro was created at the same time, covering the area of the abolished borough. The city status previously held by the borough was transferred to the new parish of Truro, allowing the parish council to take the name Truro City Council.

Carrick district was abolished in 2009. Cornwall County Council then took on district-level functions, making it a unitary authority, and was renamed Cornwall Council.

=== County town ===
The primary function of counties until the 19th century was the administration of justice. Cornwall's senior courts, the assizes, were generally held at Launceston until 1838. A new courthouse, Shire Hall, opened in Bodmin in 1838 for hosting the assizes and other courts. Bodmin was thereafter described as the county town rather than Launceston.

When county councils were established in 1889, Cornwall County Council chose to base itself in Truro rather than Bodmin. Since the separation of administrative and judicial functions in 1889, there has been no single official definition of 'county town'. Truro has been the seat of local government since 1889, but the county's assizes continued to be held at Shire Hall in Bodmin until assizes were abolished in 1972; since 1972 courts have not been organised on a county basis. Shire Hall in Bodmin closed as a courthouse in 1988, when its remaining courts transferred to the new Truro Crown Court on Edward Street.

Truro therefore now serves as the administrative centre of Cornwall, has the county's main courthouse, and is also the seat of the Anglican diocese which covers the county. It is commonly described as Cornwall's county town, although some sources maintain that Bodmin remains the county town, despite having lost the functions traditionally associated with the role.

== Transport ==
=== Roads ===
Truro is 6 miles (9.7 km) from the A30 trunk road, to which it is linked by the A39 from Falmouth and Penryn. Also passing through is the A390 between Redruth to the west and Liskeard to the east, where it joins the A38 for Plymouth, Exeter and the M5 motorway.

=== Buses ===
The city and surroundings have extensive bus services, provided mainly by Go Cornwall Bus. Most routes terminate at Truro bus station, near Lemon Quay. A permanent Park and Ride scheme, known as Park for Truro, opened in August 2008. Buses based at Langarth Park in Threemilestone carry commuters into the city via Truro College, the Royal Cornwall Hospital Treliske, County Hall, the railway station, the Cornwall Museum and Art Gallery and Victoria Square, through to a second car park on the east side of the city, operated by Dartline Coaches, which is a sister company of Go Cornwall Bus.

Truro is served by long-distance coach services, operated by National Express; there are daily departures to London, Birmingham and Penzance.

=== Railway ===
Truro railway station is located about 1 mi (1.6 km) from the city centre. It is a stop on the Cornish Main Line between Penzance and Plymouth. The station is served by two train operating companies:

- Great Western Railway provides services to Penzance, Plymouth, Reading, London Paddington, Bristol Temple Meads and Cardiff Central.
- CrossCountry operates services between Penzance, Bristol Temple Meads, Birmingham New Street, York, Newcastle and Edinburgh Waverley.

==== History ====
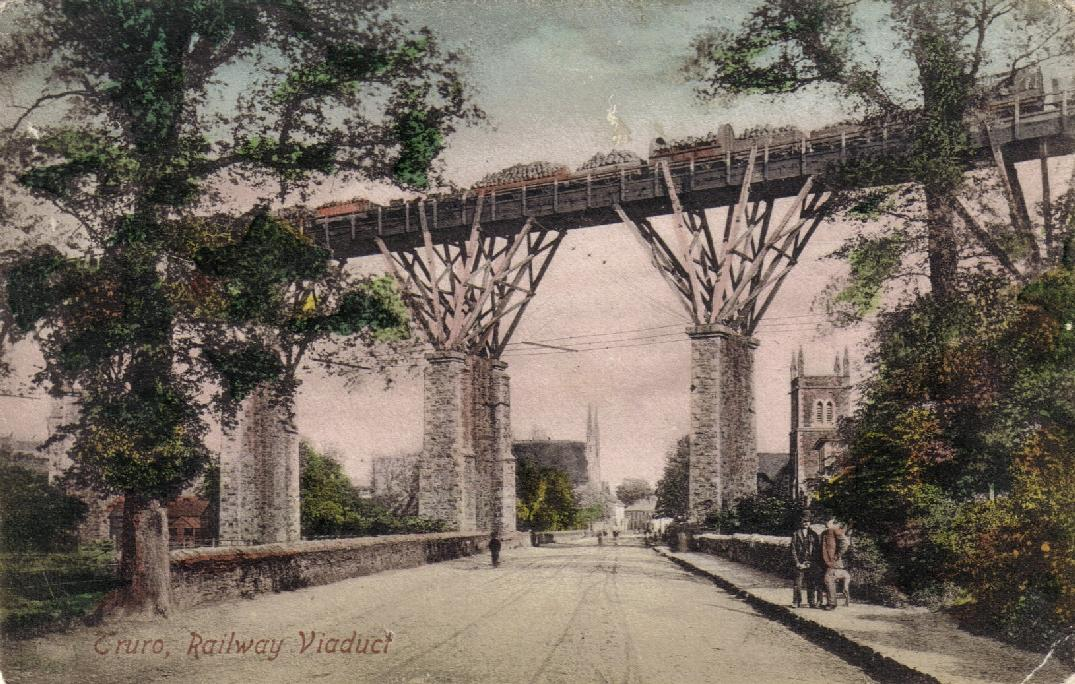
The former Carvedras Viaduct, built in 1859 by Isambard Kingdom Brunel

To the north-east of the station is a 28-metre-high (92-foot) stone viaduct with views over the city, cathedral and Truro river in the distance. The longest viaduct on the line, it replaced Isambard Kingdom Brunel's wooden Carvedras Viaduct in 1904. Connecting to the main line at Truro is the Maritime Line to Falmouth in the south.

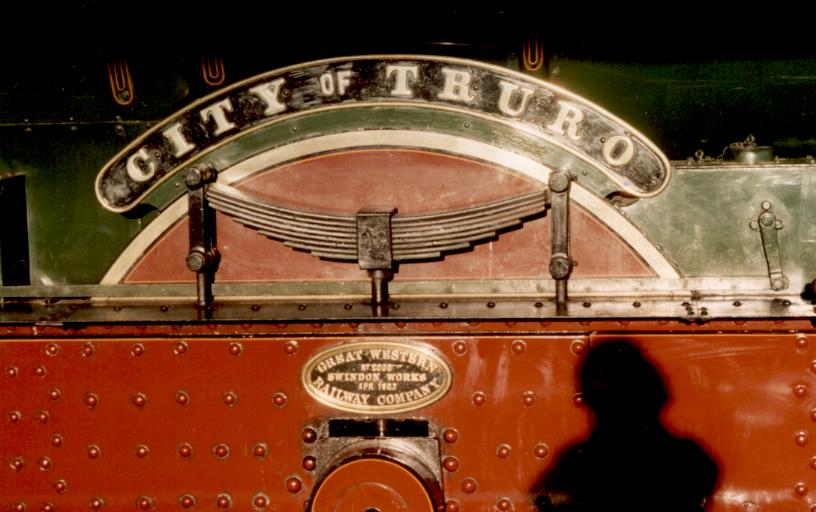
The nameplate of preserved Great Western Railway locomotive City of Truro, built in 1903

Truro's first railway station, at Highertown, was opened in 1852 by the West Cornwall Railway (WCR) for trains to Redruth and Penzance; it was known as Truro Road station. It was extended to the Truro river at Newham in 1855, but closed so that Newham served as the terminus. When the Cornwall Railway connected the line to Plymouth, its trains ran to the present station above the city centre. The WCR diverted most passenger trains to the new station, leaving Newham mainly as a goods station until it closed in 1971; it became part of the Great Western Railway. The route from Highertown to Newham is now the Newham Trail, which is a shared-use path on a countryside loop around the south side of the city.

=== Air ===
Newquay, Cornwall's main airport, is 12 mi (19 km) north of Truro. In 2017, it was thought to be the "fastest growing airport" in the UK. It has regular flights to London Heathrow and other airports including Isles of Scilly, Dublin and Düsseldorf, Germany.

=== River ===
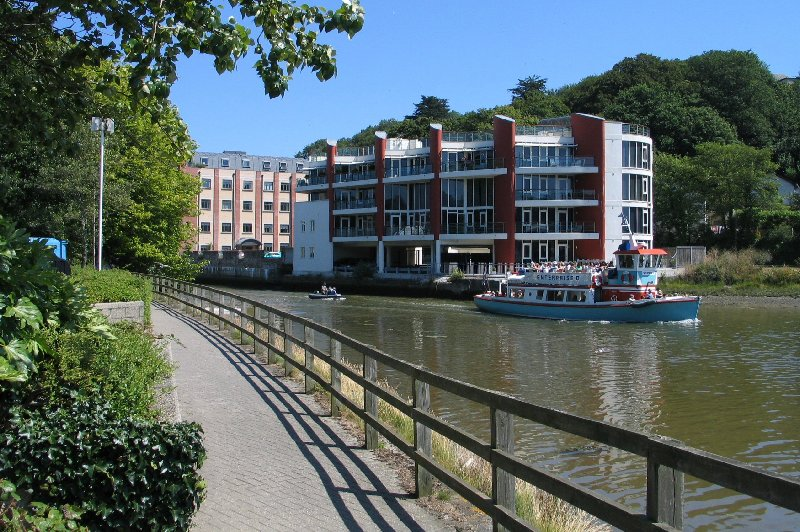
The Truro river and a ferry transporting passengers to Falmouth

There is a boat link to Falmouth along the Truro and Fal four times a day, tide permitting. The fleet run by Enterprise Boats, as part of the Fal River Links; it calls on the way at Malpas, Trelissick, Tolverne and St Mawes.

== Churches ==
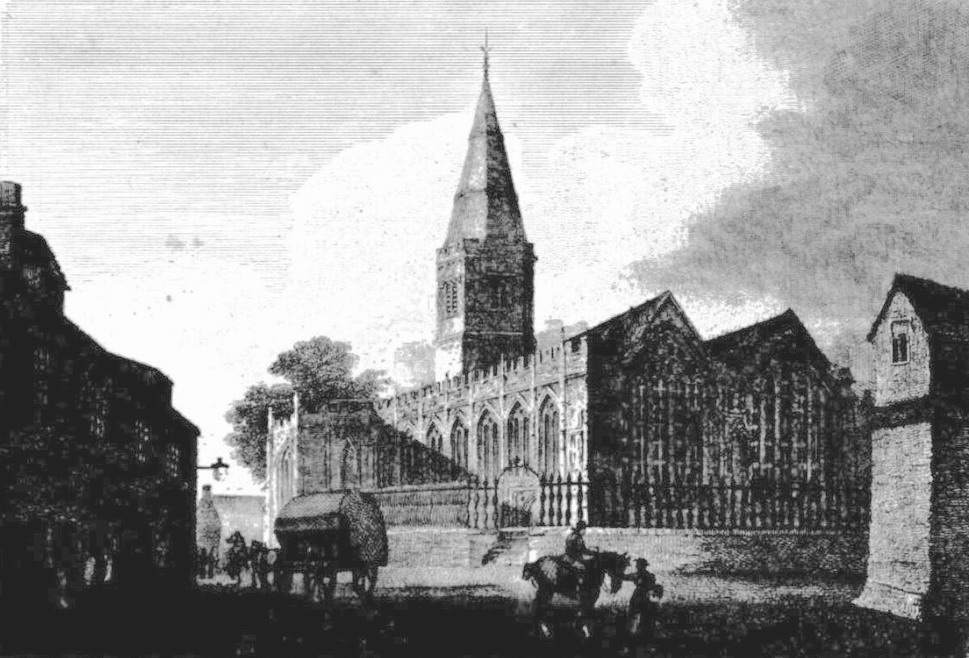
St Mary's (early 19th-century engraving)

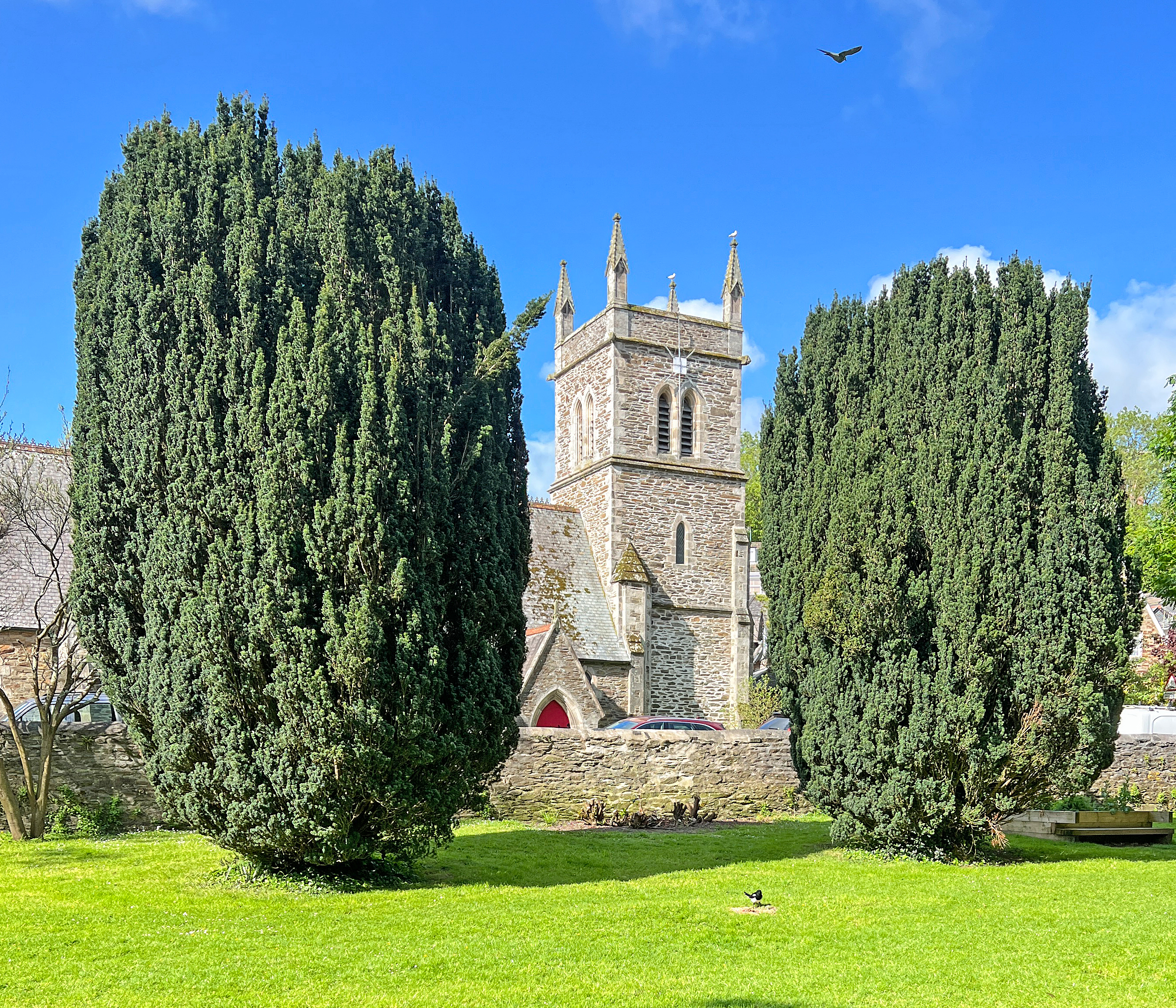
St George's

The old parish church of Truro was St Mary's, which was incorporated into the cathedral in the later 19th century. The building dates from 1518, with a later tower and spire dating from 1769.

Parts of the town were in the parishes of Kenwyn and St Clement (Moresk) until the mid-19th century, when other parishes were created. The lofty St George's church, designed by Rev. William Haslam, vicar of Baldhu, was built of Cornish granite in 1855. The parish of St George's was formed from part of Kenwyn in 1846. In 1865, two more parishes were created: St John's from part of Kenwyn and St Paul's from part of St Clement. St George's contains a large wall painting behind the high altar, the work of Stephany Cooper in the 1920s. Her father, Canon Cooper, had been a missionary in Zanzibar and elsewhere. The theme of the mural is "Three Heavens": the first heaven has views of Zanzibar and its cathedral (a happy period in the life of the artist), the second views of the city of Truro including the cathedral, the railway viaduct and St George's Church (another happy period), and the third, above the others, separated from them by the River of Life (Christ is seen bridging the river and 17 saints including St Piran and St Kenwyn are depicted).

Charles William Hempel was organist of St Mary's Church for 40 years from 1804 and also taught music. In 1805 he composed and printed Psalms from the New Version for the use of the Congregation of St. Mary's, and in 1812 Sacred Melodies for the same congregation. These melodies gained popularity.

The oldest church in Truro is at Kenwyn, on the northern side. It dates from the 14th and 15th centuries, but was almost wholly rebuilt in 1820, having deteriorated to the point where it was deemed unsafe.

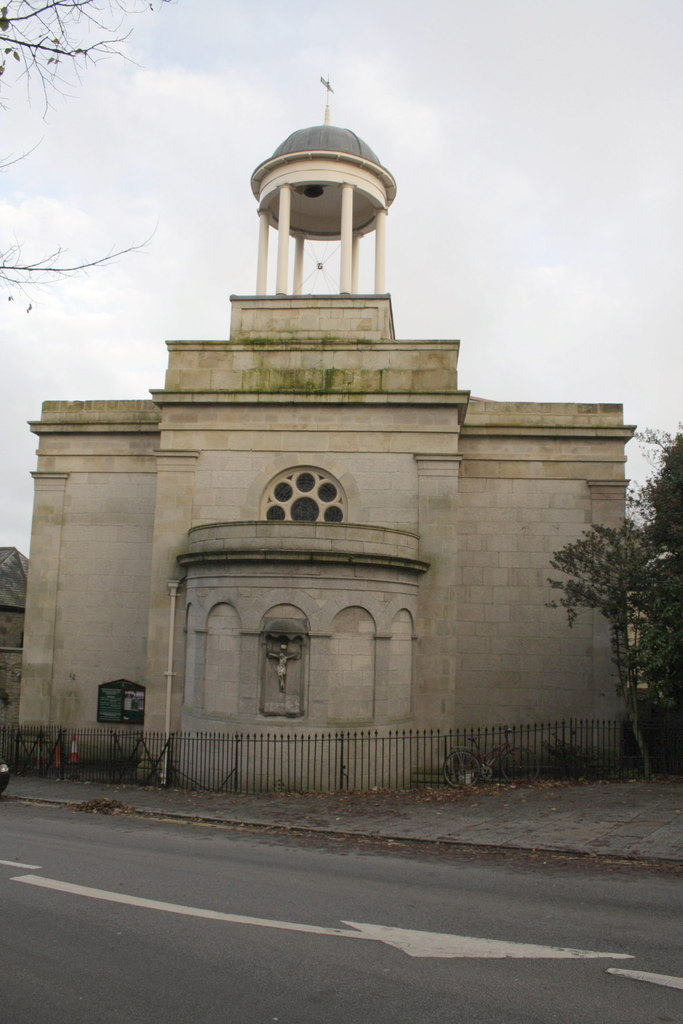
St John's Church

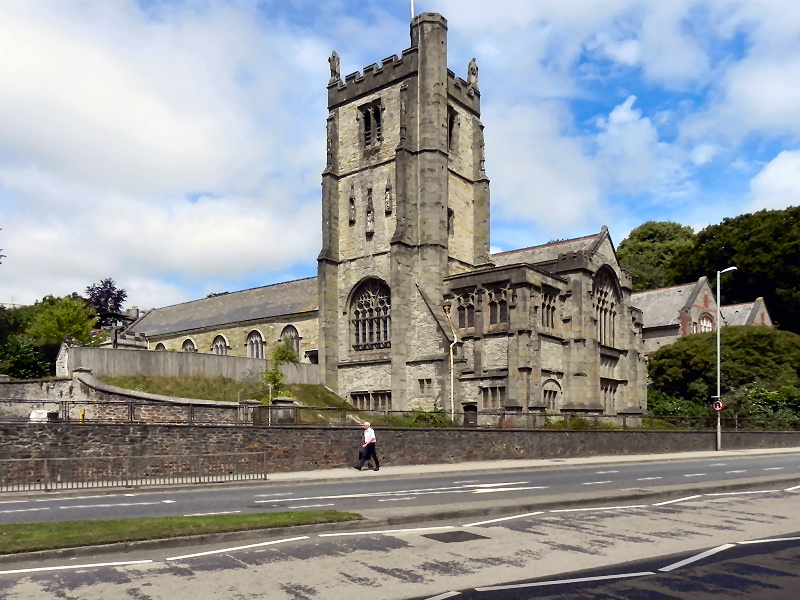
St Paul's Church

St John's Church, dedicated to St John the Evangelist, was built in 1828 (architect P. Sambell) in the Classical style on a rectangular plan and with a gallery. Alterations were carried out in the 1890s.

St Paul's Church was built in 1848. The chancel was replaced in 1882–1884, the new chancel being the work of J. D. Sedding. The tower is "broad and strong" (Pevsner) and the exterior of the aisles are ornamented in Sedding's version of the Perpendicular style. In the parish of St Paul is the former Convent of the Epiphany (Anglican) at Alverton House, Tregolls Road, an early 19th-century house extended for the convent of the Community of the Epiphany and the chapel was built in 1910 by Edmund H. Sedding. The sisterhood was founded by the Bishop of Truro, George Howard Wilkinson in 1883 and closed in 2001 when two surviving nuns moved into care homes. The sisters had been involved in pastoral and educational work and care of the cathedral and St Paul's Church. St Paul's Church, built with a tower on a river bed with poor foundations, has fallen into disrepair and is no longer used. Services are now held at the churches of St Clement, St George, and St John. St Paul and St Clement form a united benefice, as do St George and St John.

=== Other denominations ===
One Methodist place of worship remains in use, in Union Place – Truro Methodist Church – which has a broad granite front (1830, but since enlarged). There is a Quaker Meeting House in granite (c. 1830) and numerous other churches, some meeting in their own modern buildings, e.g. St Piran's Roman Catholic church and All Saints, Highertown, and some in schools or halls. St Piran's, dedicated to Our Lady of the Portal and St Piran, was built on the site of a medieval chapel by Margaret Steuart Pollard in 1973, for which she received the Benemerenti Medal from the Pope. The Baptist church building occupies the site of the former Lake's Pottery, one of the oldest in Cornwall.

== Education ==
A free grammar school associated with St Mary's Church was endowed in the 16th century. Its distinguished pupils have included the scientist Sir Humphry Davy, General Sir Hussey Vivian and the clergyman Henry Martyn.

The former Truro Girls Grammar School was converted into a Sainsbury's supermarket.

Educational institutions in Truro today include:

- Archbishop Benson – A Church of England voluntary aided primary school
- Bosvigo School
- Polwhele House Preparatory School — since the closure of Truro Cathedral School educating also the 18 boy choristers of Truro Cathedral
- Truro School — a public school founded in 1880
- Truro High School for Girls — a public school for ages 13–18
- Penair School — a state co-educational science college for ages 11–16
- Richard Lander School — a state co-educational technology college for ages 11–16
- Truro and Penwith College — A further and higher education college attached to the Combined Universities in Cornwall
- University of Exeter Medical School.

== Development ==
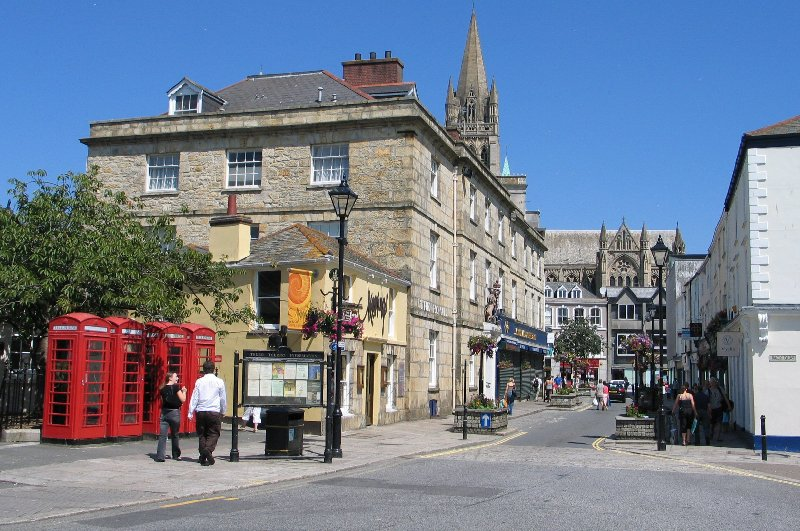
Lower Lemon Street

Truro has many proposed urban development schemes, most of which are intended to counter the main problems, notably traffic congestion and lack of housing.

Major proposals include construction of a distributor road to carry traffic away from the busy Threemilestone-Treliske corridor, reconnecting at Penventinnie Lane. This will serve the new housing planned for that area.

Changes proposed for the city centre include traffic restrictions in some of the main shopping streets and the encouragement of conversion of appropriate commercial properties back to residential use.

Redevelopment of the former Carrick District Council site at the top of Pydar Street will provide much needed homes, and facilitate the relocation to Truro of a faculty of the University of Falmouth, as well as creating space for a hotel, restaurants, leisure facilities, open spaces and public amenities. Langarth Garden Village, a major development aiming to provide homes for 8-10,000 residents, has begun construction. This includes a new access road for the development, which is being delivered alongside the A30 improvements scheme.

Along with redevelopment of the waterfront, a tidal barrier is planned to dam water into the Truro river, which is currently blighted by mud banks that appear at low tide.

More controversial plans include the construction of an urban extension at Langarth, to the west of the city, including a new stadium for Truro City F.C. and the Cornish Pirates, and perhaps eventually the relocation of the city's golf course to make way for more housing. A smaller project is the addition of two large sculptures in the Piazza.

== Culture ==
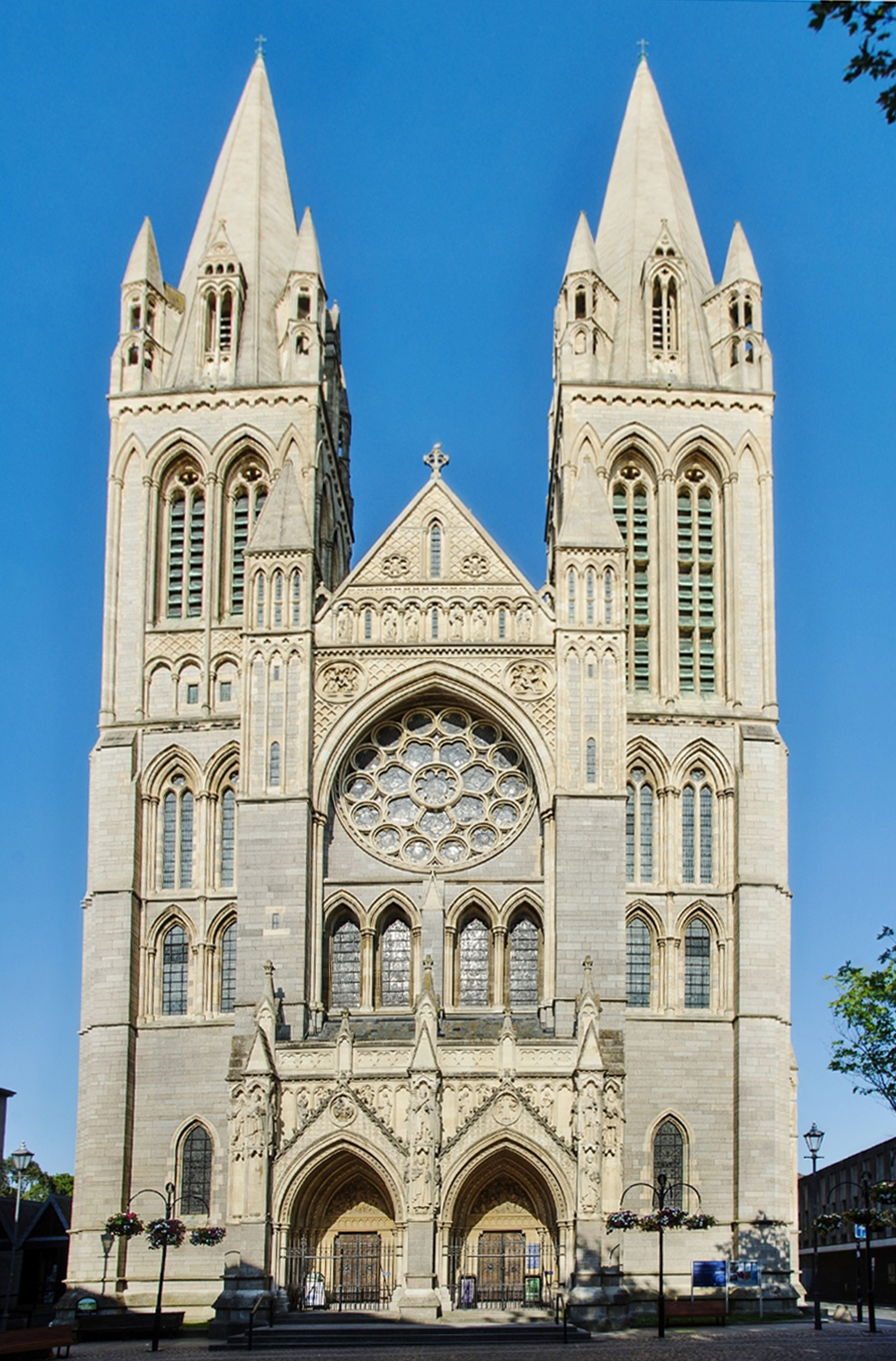
The west front of Truro Cathedral

=== Attractions ===
Truro's dominant feature is its Gothic-revival cathedral, designed by architect John Loughborough Pearson, rising 249 ft (76 m) above the city at its highest spire. It was built in 1880–1910 on the site of St Mary's Church, consecrated over 600 years earlier. Georgian architecture is well represented, with terraces and townhouses along Walsingham Place and Lemon Street often said to be "the finest examples of Georgian architecture west of the city of Bath."

The main attraction to the region is a wide variety of shopping facilities. Truro has various chain stores, speciality shops and markets that reflect its history as a market town. The indoor Pannier Market is open all year, with many stalls and small businesses. The city is also popular for catering and night life, with bars, clubs and restaurants. It houses the Hall for Cornwall, a performing arts and entertainment venue.

The Cornwall Museum and Art Gallery is the oldest and premier museum of Cornish history and culture. Its collections cover fields such as archaeology, art and geology. Among the exhibits is the so-called Arthur's inscribed stone. Its parks and open spaces include Victoria Gardens, Boscawen Park and Daubuz Moors.

=== Events ===
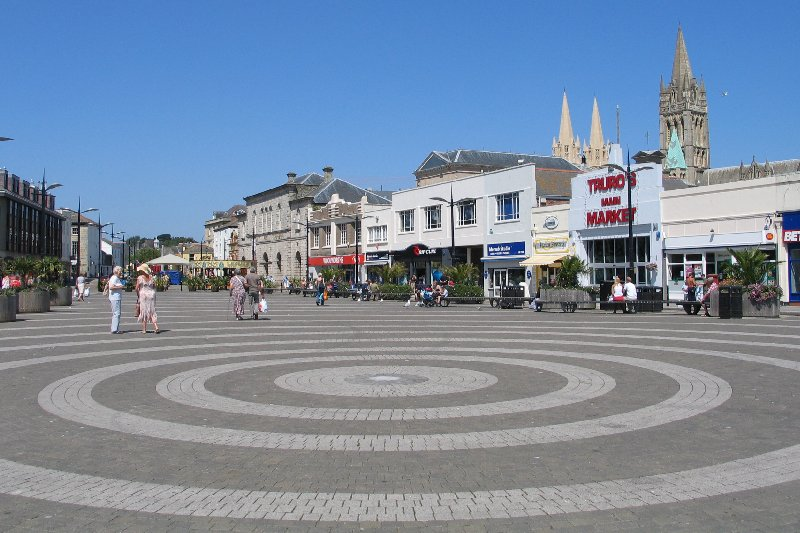
Lemon Quay

Lemon Quay is the year-round centre of most festivities in Truro.

In April, Truro prepares to take part in the Britain in Bloom competition, with floral displays and hanging baskets dotted around the city throughout the summer. A continental market comes to Truro in the holiday-making season, featuring food and craft stalls from France, Spain, Italy, Germany, Belgium, the Netherlands, Greece and elsewhere.

The Truro City Carnival, held every September over a weekend, includes various arts and music performances, children's activities, a fireworks display, food and drinks fairs, a circus and a parade. A half-marathon, organised by Truro Running Club, also occurs in September; it runs from the city centre into the countryside towards Kea, returning to finish at Lemon Quay.

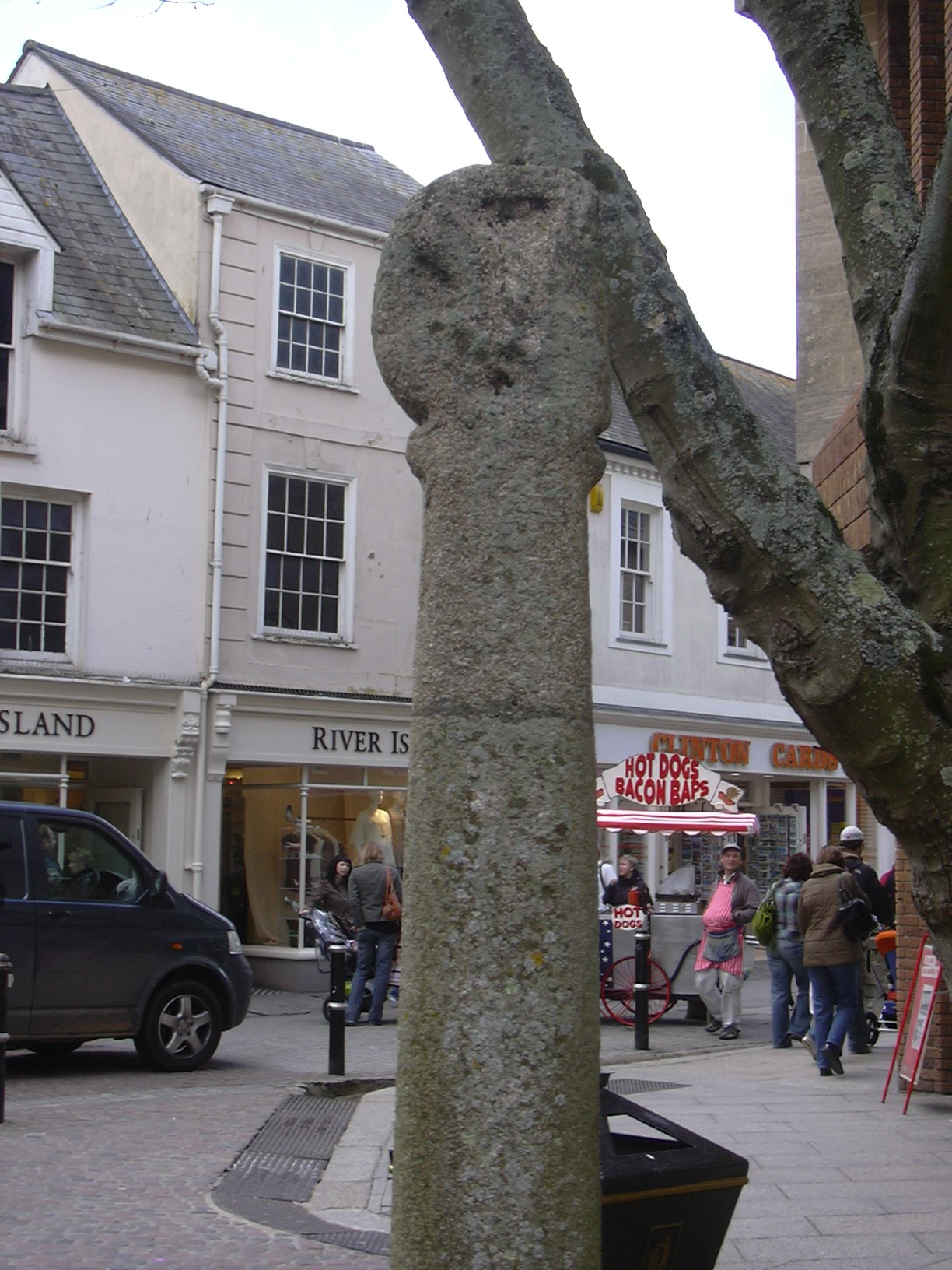
A Celtic cross at High Cross near the cathedral

Truro's Christmas includes a winter festival with a City of Lights paper lantern parade. Local schools, colleges, and community and youth groups join in.

=== Media ===
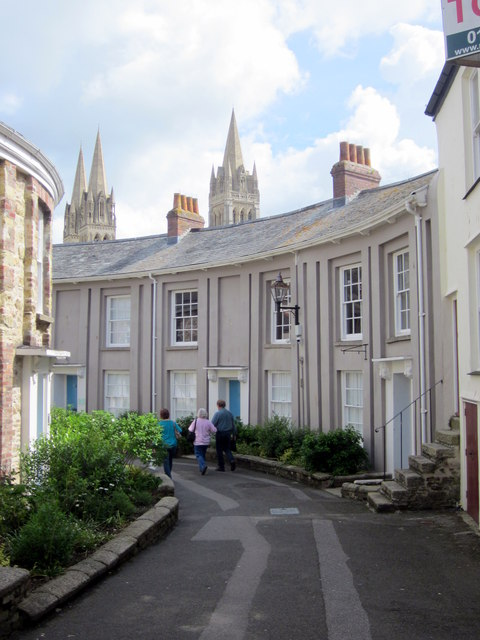
Georgian architecture at Walsingham Place

Truro is the centre of Cornwall's local media. The county weeklies, the Cornish Guardian and The West Briton, are based there; the latter provides a Truro and Mid-Cornwall edition. The city also holds the studios of BBC Radio Cornwall. Regional television is provided by BBC South West and ITV West Country.

=== Customs ===
A mummers play text ascribed until recently to Mylor, Cornwall (Note: Quoted in studies of folk plays such as The Mummers Play by R.J.E. Tiddy – published posthumously in 1923 – and The English Folk-Play (1933) by E. K. Chambers).) has now been shown by genealogical and other research to have originated in Truro about 1780.

The traditional Nine Lessons and Carols at Christmas originated in Truro in 1880, when its bishop, Edward White Benson, began to provide chances for evening singing of carols before Christmas Day, often on Christmas Eve.

== Sport ==
Truro temporarily hosted the Cornish Pirates rugby union club in the 2005–2006 season, but it moved again for 2006–2007 to share the ground of Camborne RFC. In April 2018, the construction of a Stadium for Cornwall was discussed with Cornwall Council, which had pledged £3 million towards the £14.3 million project. It is planned for a site in Threemilestone. The town's remaining rugby union side, Truro RFC, founded in 1885. It belongs to Tribute Western Counties West and plays home games at St Clements Hill. It has hosted the CRFU Cornwall Cup several times.

Truro City F.C., a football team in the National League South, is the only Cornish club ever to reach the Fifth tier of the English football league system. It achieved national recognition by winning the FA Vase in 2007 against A.F.C. Totton, in only the second final at the new Wembley Stadium; it became the first Cornish side ever to win the trophy. Its home ground is the Truro City Stadium in Threemilestone.

Cornwall County Cricket Club plays some home fixtures at Boscawen Park, which is also the home ground of Truro Cricket Club.

Truro Fencing Club is a national flagship, having won numerous national championships and supplied three fencers for Team GB at the London 2012 Olympics.

Truro has been a centre for Cornish wrestling for centuries. Before the formation of the Cornish Wrestling Association, the tournaments in Truro were often described as the Great County Wrestling Matches, with winners getting money prizes or silver medals, silver cups and silver belts. A large number of venues have been used throughout Truro, including various inns which put on tournaments such as the White Hart Inn, Western Inn, Ship Inn and Victoria Inn. In the 1970s, Truro Cathedral School taught Cornish wrestling as part of its physical education programme and was the only school in Cornwall to do so. John Lander was a noted wrestler during the late 1700s and early 1800s; he was landlord of the Fighting Cocks Inn in Truro and was the father of the famous explorers John and Richard Lander.

Other sports amenities include a leisure centre, golf course and tennis courts.

== Notable residents ==
=== Public service ===
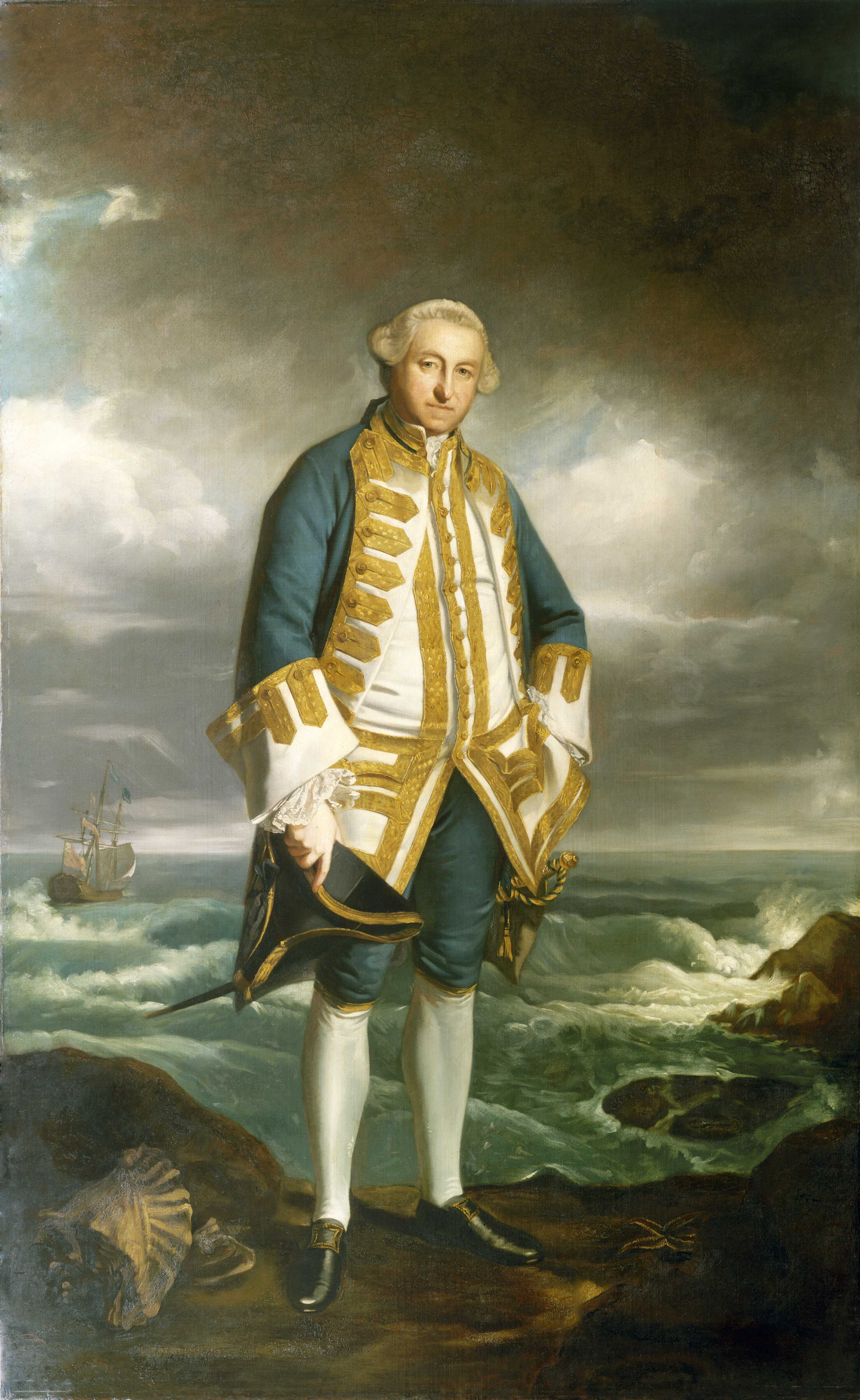
Admiral Edward Boscawen, ca. 1824-25

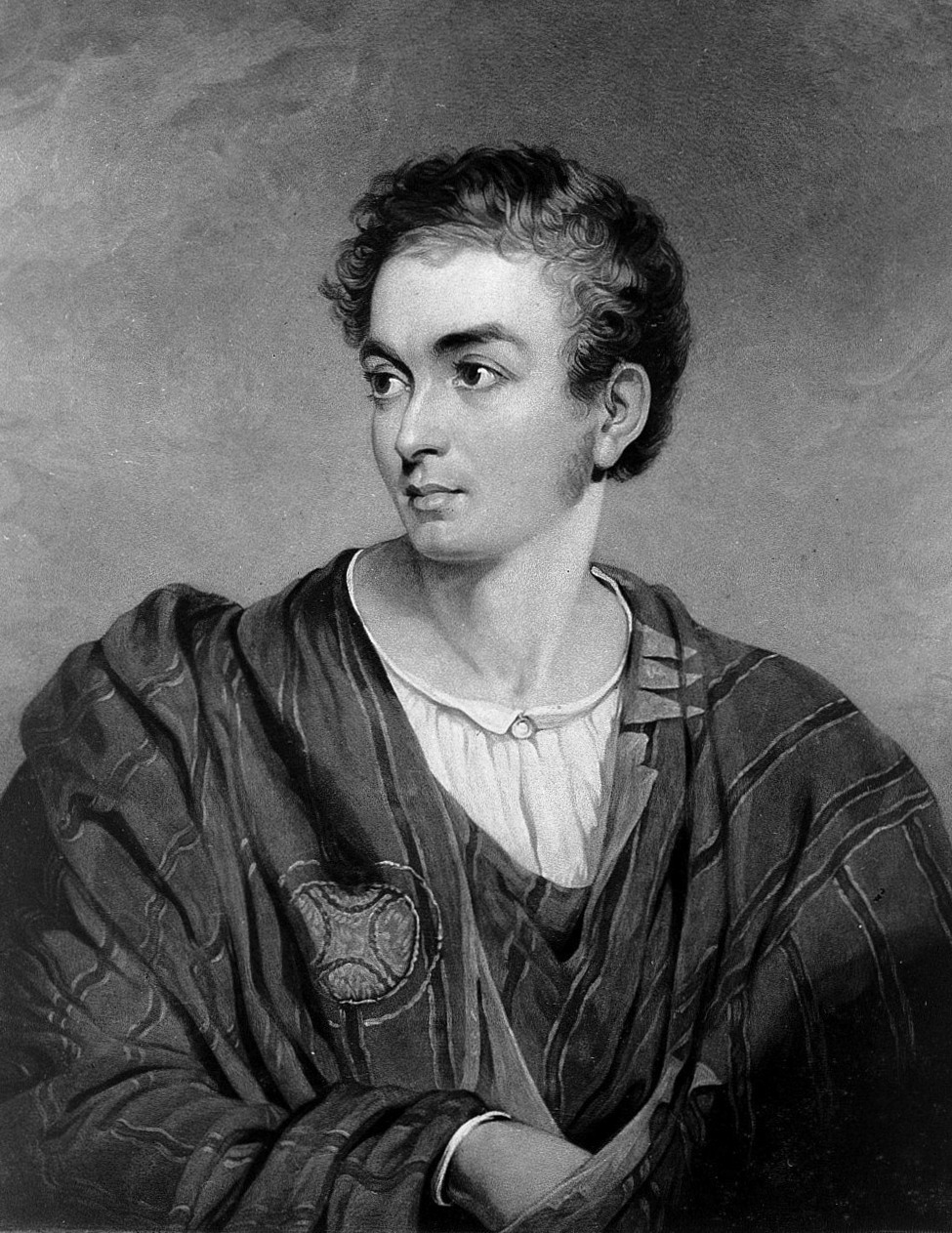
Richard Lemon Lander, 1835

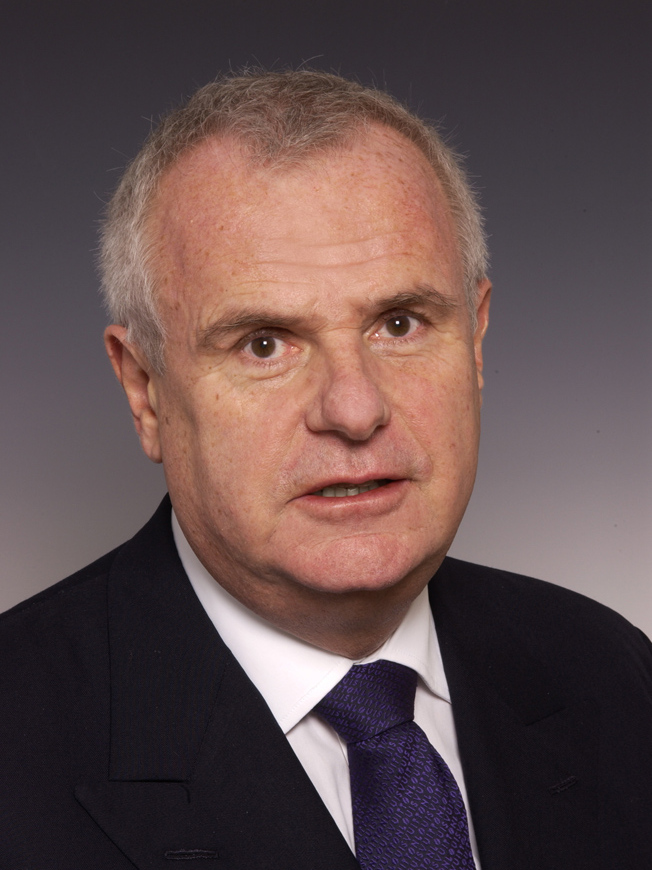
Paul Myners, 2006

- Sir Henry Killigrew (c. 1528–1603), Cornish diplomat and an ambassador
- Owen Fitzpen (1552–1636), philanthropist and merchant seaman, led a successful slave revolt in 1627 to free captives of Barbary pirates, memorialised on a plaque in St Mary's Church.
- John Robartes, 1st Earl of Radnor (1606–1685), a politician who fought for the Parliamentary cause
- William Gwavas (1676–1741), barrister and writer in the Cornish language
- Edward Boscawen (1711–1761), Royal Navy admiral, eponym of a cobbled street at the centre of Truro and a park
- Samuel Walker (1714–1761), evangelical clergyman, curate of Truro from 1746
- Richard Polwhele (1760–1838), a clergyman, poet and historian of Cornwall and Devon
- Charles Sandoe Gilbert (1760–1831), druggist and historian of Cornwall
- Hussey Vivian, 1st Baron Vivian (1775–1842), a senior British cavalry officer
- Henry Martyn (1781–1812), Cambridge mathematician and missionary in India and Persia, who translated the Bible into local languages
- Thomas Wilde, 1st Baron Truro (1782–1855), Lord High Chancellor, 1850 to 1852.
- Admiral Sir Barrington Reynolds (1786–1861), senior Royal Navy officer
- FitzRoy Somerset, 1st Baron Raglan (1788–1855), a senior Army officer and MP for Truro in 1818 & 1826.
- Richard Spurr (1800–1855), cabinet maker and lay preacher imprisoned for Chartism. A large allotment in the town was dedicated to him in 2011.
- Major-General Sir Henry James (1803–1877), a Royal Engineers officer and DG of the Ordnance Survey 1854–1875
- Richard Lemon Lander (1804–1834), explorer in West Africa. A local secondary school is named in his honour and a monument to his memory stands at the top of Lemon Street.
- John Lander (1806–1839), printer and explorer with his brother Richard Lemon Lander
- Charles Chorley (c. 1810–1874), journalist and man of letters
- William Bennett Bond (1815–1906), Canadian priest and second primate of the Anglican Church of Canada
- Alexander Mackennal (1835–1904), nonconformist minister
- Silvanus Trevail (1851–1903), local architect and mayor of Truro
- Joseph Hunkin (1887–1950), Bishop of Truro from 1935 to 1950
- James Henry Fynn (Finn, 1893–1917), recipient of the Victoria Cross
- Barbara Joyce West (1911–2007), second-to-last survivor of the RMS Titanic
- Alison Adburgham (1912–1997), social historian and fashion journalist, died in the town.
- Hugh Clegg (1920–1995), academic, founded the National Board for Prices and Incomes (1965–1971)
- David Penhaligon (1944–1986), politician, Liberal MP for Truro 1974–1986
- Paul Myners, Baron Myners, (1948–2022), businessman and politician
- Mark Laity (born c. 1962), NATO spokesman and former BBC correspondent
- NneNne Iwuji-Eme (born c.1978), British diplomat, UK High Commissioner to Mozambique
- Staff Sergeant Olaf Schmid, (1979–2009), a British Army bomb-disposal expert.

=== Arts ===
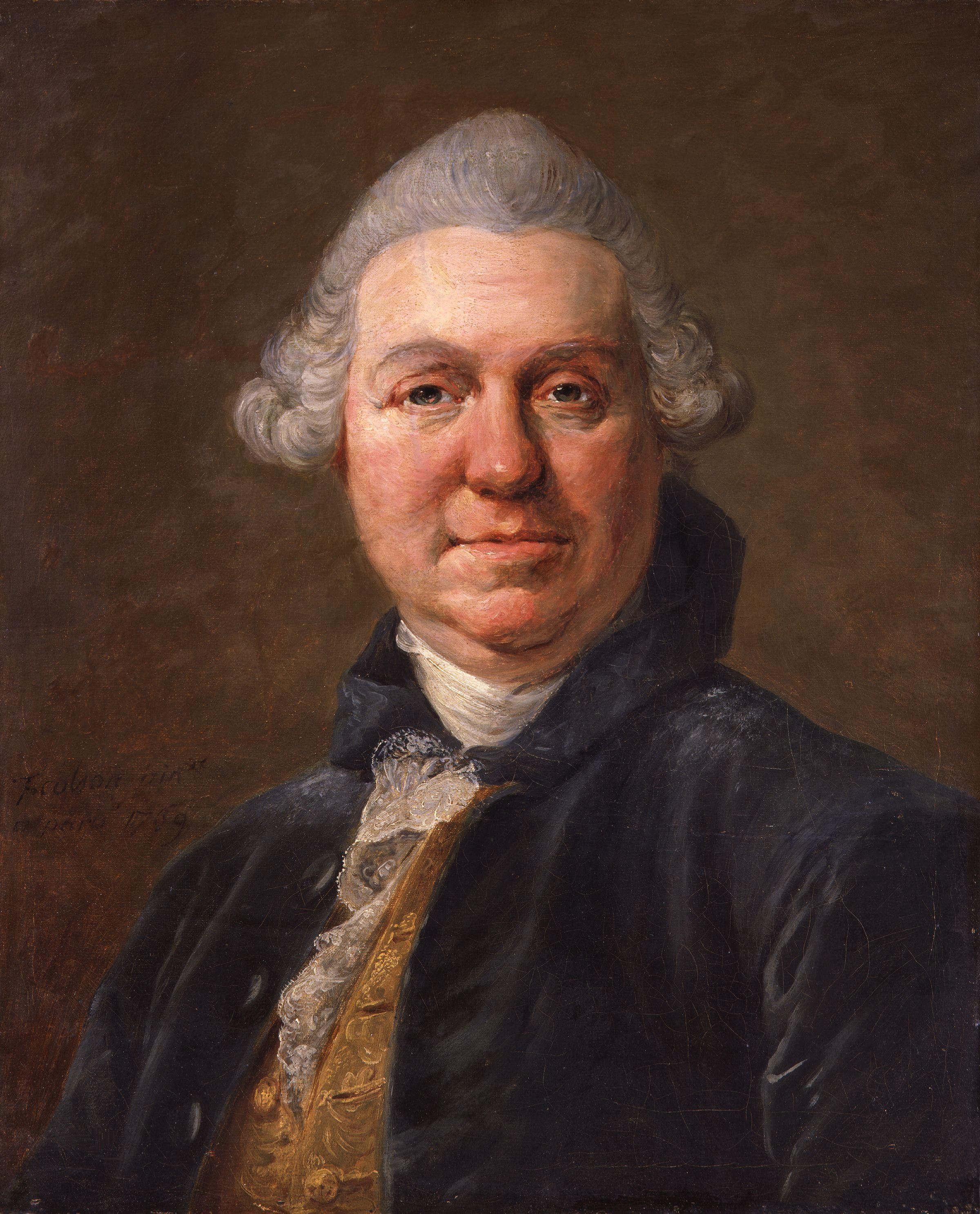
Samuel Foote, 1769

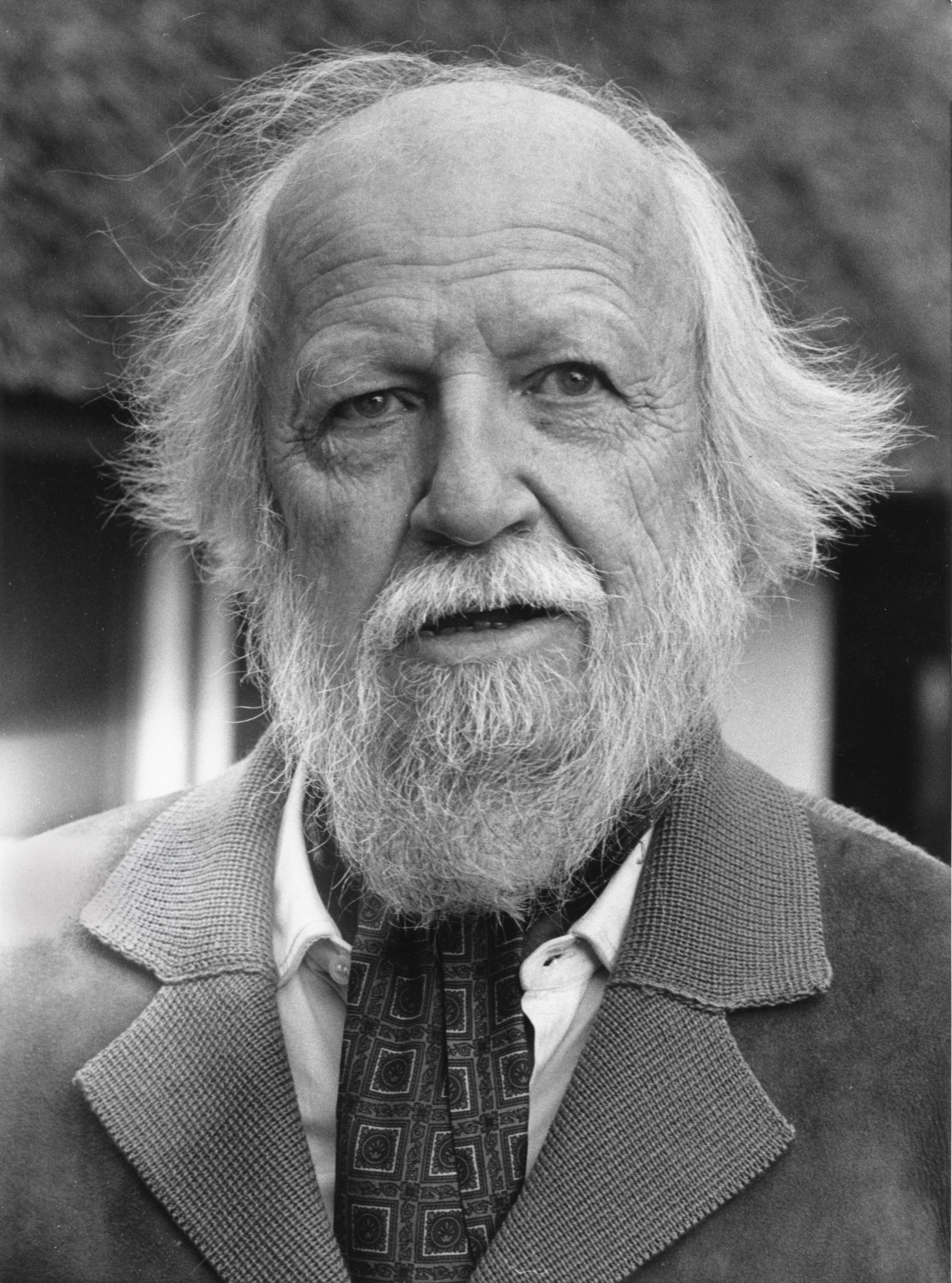
William Golding, 1983

- Giles Farnaby (c. 1563–1640), composer and virginalist
- Samuel Foote (1720–1777), actor and playwright
- Henry Bone (1755–1834), porcelain, jewellery and enamel painter
- Joseph Antonio Emidy (1775–1835), former slave from Guinea turned violinist
- Charles William Hempel (1777–1855), organist of St Mary's Church, Truro, and poet
- Nicholas Michell (1807–1880) a Cornish writer, best known for his poetry
- Charles Frederick Hempel (1811–1867), organist and composer
- Walter Hawken Tregellas (1831–1894), professional draughtsman and historical and biographical writer
- Francis Charles Hingeston-Randolph (1833–1910), cleric, antiquary and author
- Henry Dawson Lowry (1869–1906), journalist, short story writer, novelist and poet
- Albert Sherman (1882–1971), a prolific Australian flower painter born in Truro.
- Hugh Walpole (1884–1941) novelist, who attended a preparatory school in Truro
- Maria Kuncewiczowa (1895–1989), Polish writer lived here after WWII, where her novel Tristan 1946 was set.
- Margaret Steuart Pollard (1904–1996), poet and translator lived in Truro from 1930s
- William Golding (1911–1993), novelist, playwright and poet, gained the Nobel Prize in Literature in 1983. Born in St Columb Minor, he returned to live near Truro in 1985.
- Alison Adburgham (1912–1997), author, social historian and fashion editor of The Guardian
- Irene Newton (1915–1992), artist
- Catherine Grubb, artist (born 1945), lives in Truro.
- Roger Taylor (born 1949), drummer from the rock band Queen
- Robert Goddard (born 1954), novelist, lives in Truro.
- James Marsh (born 1963), film director and Academy Award winner
- Ben Salfield (born 1971), guitarist, lutenist, composer and teacher, has lived in Truro since age of nine.
- Paul Kerensa (born 1979), comedy writer and stand-up comedian
- Brett Harvey (born c. 1980), film writer and director based in Cornwall
- Calvin Dean (born 1985), award-winning actor
- Kerensa Briggs (born 1991), composer.

=== Science and business ===
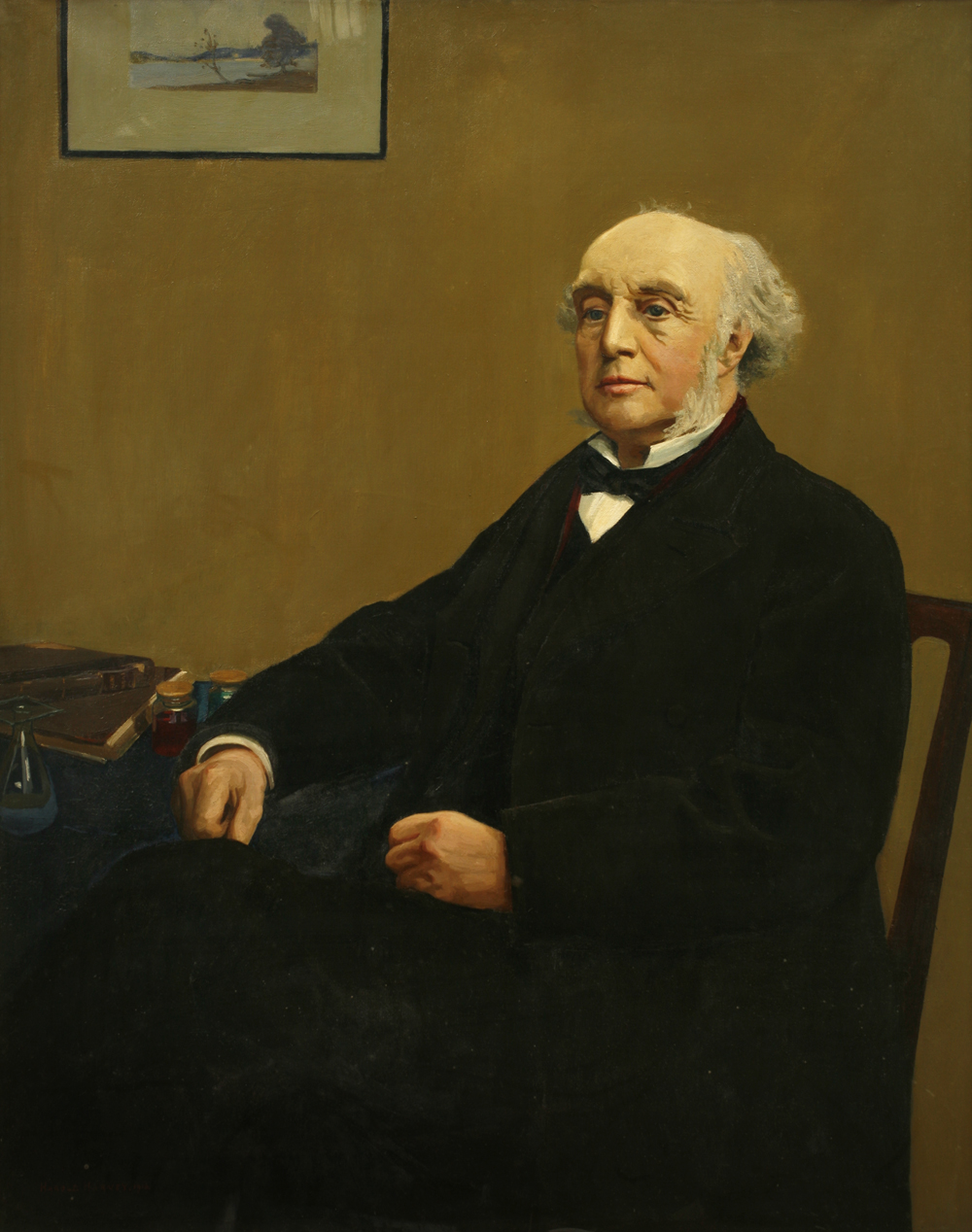
Charles Foster Barham, 1916

- John Vivian (1750–1826), industrialist in Swansea, descendant of the Vivian family
- Elizabeth Andrew Warren (1786–1864), a Cornish botanist and marine algologist
- Charles Foster Barham (1804–1884), physician and writer on public health
- Edwin Dunkin (1821–1898), an astronomer and the president of the Royal Astronomical Society
- Henry Charlton Bastian (1837–1915), physiologist and neurologist
- Edward Arnold (1857–1942), a publisher, founded Edward Arnold Publishers Ltd in 1890.
- Elsie Wilkins Sexton (1868–1959), a zoologist and biological illustrator
- H. Lou Gibson (1906–1992), expert in medical uses of infrared to detect breast cancer.

=== Sport ===
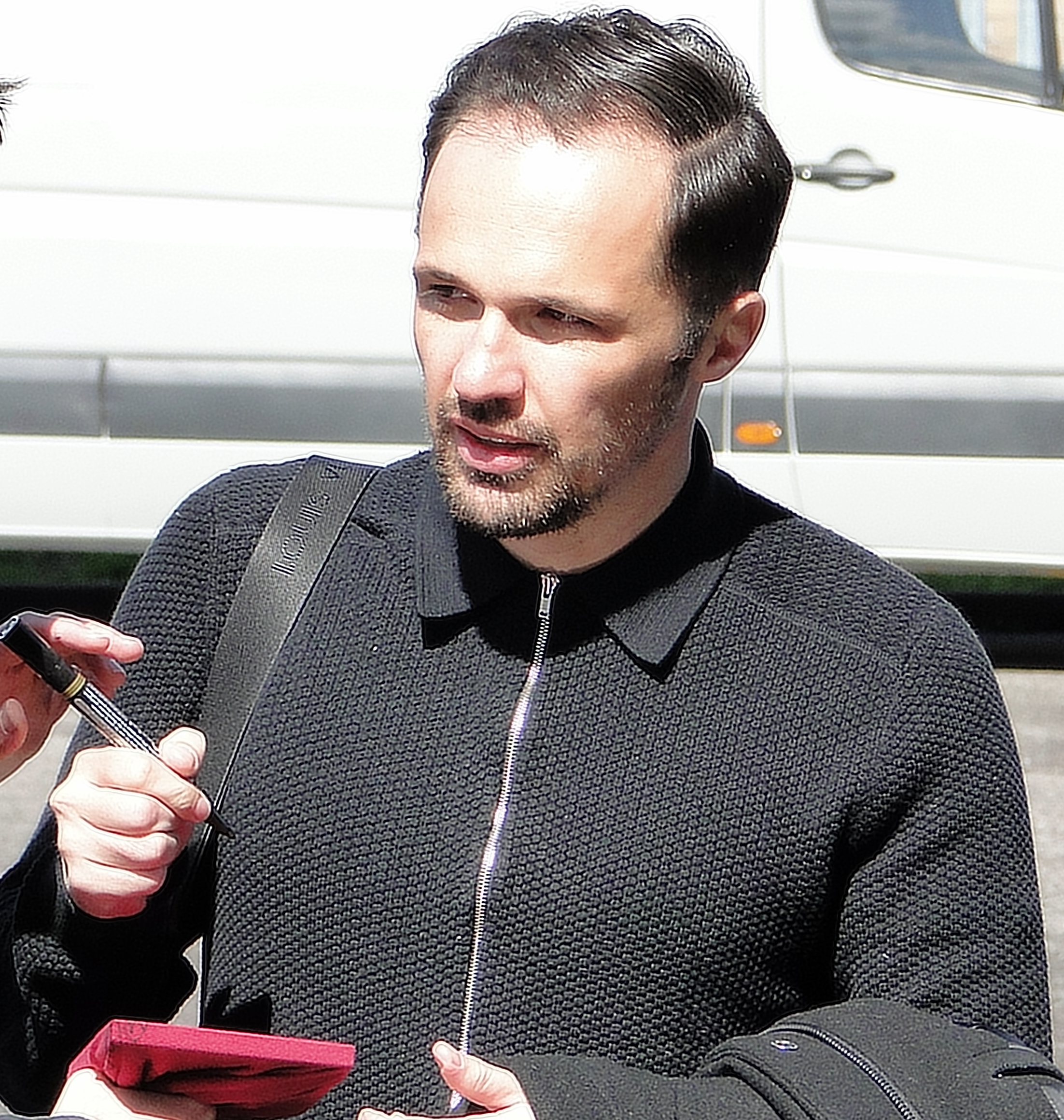
Matthew Etherington, 2015

- Nick Nieland (born 1972), javelin gold medallist at the 2006 Commonwealth Games
- Matthew Etherington (born 1981), former professional footballer with 426 club caps, he played for West Ham and Stoke City.
- David Paynter (born 1981), former first-class cricketer
- Tom Voyce (1981–2024), former rugby union footballer with London Wasps and England
- Annabel Vernon (born 1982), retired rower, team silver medallist at the 2008 Summer Olympics
- Chris Harris (born 1982), international speedway rider
- Gemma Prescott (born 1983), Paralympic track and field athlete
- Darren Dawidiuk (born 1987), rugby union footballer
- Craig Alcock (born 1987), professional footballer
- Matthew Whorwood (born 1989), Paralympic swimmer, bronze medallist in two Paralympic Games
- Matthew Shepherd (born 1990), rugby union player
- Luke Cowan-Dickie (born 1993), rugby union player
- Jack Nowell (born 1993), rugby union player
- Molly Caudery (born 2000), British pole vaulter
- Alex Quinn (born 2000), racing driver.

== Twinning ==
Truro is twinned with

- Boppard, Rhineland-Palatinate, Germany
- Morlaix, Brittany, France

=== Namesakes ===
Several towns outside Britain have taken Truro as their name:

- Truro, Nova Scotia, Canada
- Truro, Massachusetts, United States
- Truro, Iowa, United States
- Truro, South Australia, Australia.

== See also ==
- Diocese of Truro
- Outline of Cornwall.
