= Stewart Yetton =

English footballer (born 1985)

Personal information
- Full name: Stewart David Yetton
- Date of birth: 27 July 1985 (age 41)
- Place of birth: Plymouth, England
- Position: Forward

Team information
- Current team: Truro City

Senior career*
Years	Team	Apps	(Gls)
2003–2005	Plymouth Argyle	3	(0)
2004	→ Weymouth (loan)	1	(0)
2005	Tiverton Town	23	(7)
2005–2013	Truro City	309	(219)
2009	→ Ivybridge Town (loan)	3	(4)
2013–2017	Weymouth	131	(65)
2017	→ Truro City (loan)	11	(1)
2017–2018	Truro City	15	(1)
2018	Plymouth Parkway	15	(5)
2018–2019	Tiverton Town	21	(6)
2019–	Truro City	10	(1)
- * Club domestic league appearances and goals as of 21:36, 26 April 2025 (UTC)

Stewart David Yetton (born 27 July 1985) is an English footballer who plays as a striker for, and is assistant-manager at, National League side Truro City.

== Career ==
=== Early career ===
Born in Plymouth, Devon, Yetton began his career at Plymouth Argyle in 2003, but found his chances in the first team were limited. After a trial with St Mirren and a month-long loan spell at Weymouth, in which his only appearance was as a substitute in the 3–0 win over St Albans City on 13 November 2004, he moved to Tiverton Town on 11 February 2005. He scored twice on his debut in a 2–0 win at Cirencester Town the following day, and scored ten goals in league and cup during his time at the Devon club.

=== Truro City ===
Yetton moved to Truro City late in 2005, with the club then in the South Western League. He proved to be a prolific goalscorer with 200 goals in all competitions by February 2010 as City progressed through the Western League and the Southern League. These included 72 goals during the 2006–07 season (a club record), and six goals in the 8–5 victory over Radstock Town in 2007–08.

Stewart Yetton went on a month's loan at Ivybridge Town at the start of the 2009–10 season for one month to regain fitness from his shoulder injury, scoring four goals in three games. On his first match back from his loan, in the FA Cup Third Qualifying Round, Yetton scored the equaliser for Truro against Mangotsfield United in the 90th minute to earn a replay.

On 20 February 2010, Yetton scored his 200th league goal for Truro City, a late goal against Bedford Town. His total number of goals at that point was greater than the number of games he had played in the league, and he is the record goalscorer at the club.

After five months on the sidelines with a knee injury during the 2012–13 season, Yetton returned to the Truro squad and scored three goals in three games, although the club were relegated from the Conference South. However, his career at Truro was ended after a training ground incident on 18 April 2013, in which City defender Ben Gerring suffered a broken jaw. Yetton was initially suspended until the end of the season, and was linked with a return to Weymouth. In nearly eight years at Truro, he scored 226 goals in 315 league and cup appearances, also scoring in his last game, a 2–1 win at A.F.C. Hornchurch on 13 April. He became a free agent on 2 May and signed for the Terras on 4 May.

=== Later career ===
In 2013 Yetton joined Weymouth and scored 27 league goals in 44 league games in his first season with the Terras. In May 2014, Yetton signed a contract to keep him at Weymouth until the end of the 2015–16 season.

Short spells back at Truro City followed, as well as a stint as a player-coach at Plymouth Parkway in 2018. In December 2018, Yetton rejoined Southern League side Tiverton Town.

For the start of the 2019–20 season, Yetton once again rejoined Truro City, as a player and as assistant-manager to Paul Wotton.

== Outside football ==
In August 2011, Yetton took a five-wicket haul on debut for Old Suttonians Cricket Club, helping them to a nine-wicket win.

== Honours ==
Truro City

- FA Vase: 2007
- Southern League Premier Division: 2010–11
- Southern League Division One South & West: 2008–09
- Western League Premier Division: 2007–08
- Western League Division One: 2006–07
- South Western League runner-up: 2005–06
- Cornwall Senior Cup: 2005–06, 2006–07, 2007–08
