= 2008–09 Southern Football League =

The 2008–09 season was the 106th in the history of the Southern League, which is an English football competition featuring semi-professional and amateur clubs from the South West, South Central and Midlands of England and South Wales.

At the end of the season Division One Midlands was renamed Division One Central.

== Premier Division ==
The Premier Division consisted of 22 clubs, including 17 clubs from the previous season and five new clubs:

- Two clubs promoted from Division One Midlands:
  - Evesham United
  - Stourbridge
- Two clubs promoted from Division One South & West:
  - Farnborough
  - Oxford City
- Plus:
  - Cambridge City, relegated from the Conference South

Corby Town won the Premier Division and along with play-off winners Gloucester City got a place in the Conference North next year.

Mangotsfield United, Yate Town and Hitchin Town relegated to the divisions One, while Banbury United were reprieved from relegation after two Conference South clubs folded.

=== League table ===
Southern Football League Premier Division
- Season: 2008–09
- Champions: Corby Town
- Promoted: Corby Town; Gloucester City
- Relegated: Hitchin Town; Yate Town; Mangotsfield United
- Matches: 462
- Goals: 1,328 (2.87 per match)
- Top goalscorer: David Kolodynski (Rugby Town) - 24
- Biggest home win: Stourbridge 6 – 1 Clevedon Town, 30 August 2008 Cambridge City 5 – 0 Bashley, 20 September 2008; Brackley Town 5 – 0 Corby Town, 27 December 2008; Bedford Town 5 – 0 Hitchin Town, 20 January 2009 Corby Town 5 – 0 Banbury United, 25 April 2009
- Biggest away win: Banbury United 0 – 6 Evesham United, 14 February 2009
- Highest scoring: Stourbridge 8–4 Yate Town, 20 December 2008
- Highest attendance: 2230 (Farnborough 3 – 3 Corby Town, 21 March 2009)
- Lowest attendance: 71 (Evesham United 3 – 1 Mangotsfield United, 27 January 2009)
- Average attendance: 310

Pos	Team	Pld	W	D	L	GF	GA	GD	Pts	Promotion or relegation
1	Corby Town	42	25	9	8	85	38	+47	84	Promoted to the Conference North
2	Farnborough	42	23	14	5	67	36	+31	83	Qualified for the play-offs
3	Gloucester City	42	21	12	9	80	45	+35	75	Qualified for the play-offs, then promoted to the Conference North
4	Cambridge City	42	21	10	11	62	40	+22	73	Qualified for the play-offs
5	Hemel Hempstead Town	42	21	7	14	71	48	+23	70	Qualified for the play-offs
6	Oxford City	42	19	10	13	76	55	+21	67	
7	Merthyr Tydfil	42	19	10	13	66	55	+11	67	
8	Chippenham Town	42	20	8	14	64	51	+13	65 (Note: Chippenham were docked 3 points for fielding an ineligible player.)	
9	Evesham United	42	16	13	13	48	39	+9	61	
10	Halesowen Town	42	19	6	17	65	73	−8	60 (Note: Halesowen were docked 3 points for fielding an ineligible player.)	
11	Brackley Town	42	15	12	15	69	62	+7	57	
12	Tiverton Town	42	16	9	17	51	50	+1	57	
13	Swindon Supermarine	42	15	12	15	59	61	−2	57	
14	Bashley	42	15	12	15	52	58	−6	57	
15	Bedford Town	42	14	8	20	44	55	−11	50	
16	Stourbridge	42	13	11	18	62	78	−16	50	
17	Rugby Town	42	11	10	21	63	71	−8	43	
18	Clevedon Town	42	11	10	21	51	80	−29	43	
19	Banbury United	42	11	8	23	43	83	−40	41	Reprieved from relegation
20	Hitchin Town	42	10	10	22	57	79	−22	40	Relegated to Division One Central
21	Yate Town	42	9	9	24	54	91	−37	36	Relegated to Division One South & West
22	Mangotsfield United	42	10	6	26	39	80	−41	36	Relegated to Division One South & West

Source: fchd.com
Rules for classification: 1) points; 2) goal difference; 3) number of goals scored.

=== Play-offs ===
Semifinals
2	Farnborough	0(4)
5	Hemel Hempstead Town	0(3)
3	Gloucester City	3
4	Cambridge City	1

Final
2	Farnborough	0
3	Gloucester City	1

=== Results ===
Home \ Away	BAN	BAS	BED	BRK	CAM	CHI	CLE	COR	EVE	FAR	GLO	HAL	HEM	HIT	MAN	MER	OXC	RUG	STB	SWI	TIV	YAT
Banbury United		1–0	4–0	3–1	2–2	0–5	3–1	0–4	0–6	0–2	1–5	2–1	3–0	1–4	1–1	1–1	1–0	2–1	2–0	1–5	0–3	3–0
Bashley	1–0		1–0	1–1	0–0	2–1	1–0	0–3	0–0	1–0	1–1	1–3	2–1	4–0	0–1	1–3	3–2	3–1	4–1	2–2	0–3	1–1
Bedford Town	3–0	0–2		0–0	1–1	2–0	0–0	1–5	1–1	0–2	1–1	1–0	1–2	5–0	3–1	1–0	3–1	2–0	2–1	1–0	1–1	1–1
Brackley Town	1–2	2–4	2–0		2–0	1–0	1–1	5–0	2–1	1–1	2–3	4–1	3–2	1–2	3–1	2–2	2–1	2–2	3–0	0–3	1–2	0–1
Cambridge City	3–1	5–0	1–0	1–0		0–1	0–1	3–2	2–3	0–2	2–1	3–0	1–0	3–1	0–2	3–0	1–0	3–2	2–0	0–1	1–0	2–2
Chippenham Town	1–0	2–3	1–0	3–1	3–1		2–1	3–1	1–0	1–1	2–2	2–1	1–2	1–1	1–1	1–0	0–2	1–1	1–2	3–1	1–0	3–0
Clevedon Town	1–1	0–0	2–1	2–2	1–0	3–2		1–3	2–0	1–1	1–4	1–2	0–3	1–2	2–3	1–5	0–1	1–0	2–0	1–2	1–2	4–3
Corby Town	5–0	3–1	1–2	2–0	0–0	3–0	4–0		0–0	3–1	1–2	1–2	0–0	2–0	1–1	2–1	0–1	2–0	0–0	2–1	1–4	1–1
Evesham United	2–0	2–2	0–1	1–1	0–1	2–0	0–0	1–1		0–0	2–2	0–0	4–1	2–1	3–1	0–2	0–1	1–0	0–1	1–0	1–1	4–1
Farnborough	1–0	1–1	3–1	2–2	1–1	2–0	3–1	3–3	2–1		2–1	1–1	1–0	1–0	3–1	0–1	0–2	2–1	4–0	1–0	1–0	2–0
Gloucester City	1–1	3–0	0–1	0–1	2–1	2–0	0–1	1–3	2–0	0–0		1–2	2–1	4–1	5–2	1–1	2–2	3–0	4–0	3–1	2–1	4–0
Halesowen Town	2–1	2–0	2–1	3–2	2–2	2–2	3–5	0–5	3–1	0–1	1–2		2–1	3–2	2–0	2–0	5–2	0–4	1–3	2–4	0–1	5–3
Hemel Hempstead Town	1–0	0–0	1–0	2–1	0–1	1–1	0–0	0–1	4–0	3–1	2–1	1–1		4–2	3–0	1–0	0–1	3–1	4–3	1–1	0–1	1–0
Hitchin Town	2–0	1–1	0–0	0–1	1–1	2–1	2–2	2–2	1–2	1–3	1–1	0–1	2–1		3–2	2–2	0–4	1–1	2–2	0–1	0–1	3–1
Mangotsfield United	1–0	1–0	3–2	0–3	0–3	0–4	2–0	0–3	0–0	0–2	0–1	0–1	0–1	2–1		0–3	2–2	0–2	1–2	2–1	3–2	1–2
Merthyr Tydfil	3–0	0–2	3–0	1–4	1–1	2–0	2–2	0–2	1–0	1–1	2–1	2–0	3–2	3–2	1–0		2–2	3–3	4–1	1–2	1–2	2–1
Oxford City	3–0	2–0	1–0	3–0	1–0	2–2	5–3	0–1	0–1	2–2	1–1	4–1	2–3	2–3	4–0	1–4		3–2	1–1	1–2	3–0	4–0
Rugby Town	0–0	2–3	3–0	3–3	2–3	0–1	4–0	0–2	0–1	2–3	1–3	0–2	0–5	4–3	2–1	3–0	1–1		4–0	0–0	2–0	2–2
Stourbridge	1–1	1–1	3–1	0–1	1–1	1–2	6–1	0–2	0–2	0–3	1–1	2–2	1–6	1–0	4–1	1–2	2–0	1–1		2–1	3–0	8–4
Swindon Supermarine	4–4	3–2	2–1	4–4	0–2	1–3	0–1	1–4	1–1	1–1	0–1	1–0	1–4	0–4	2–1	0–0	1–1	3–1	1–1		1–0	3–0
Tiverton Town	2–0	2–1	0–2	2–1	1–2	1–2	3–2	0–2	0–1	0–2	2–2	3–0	1–1	3–1	0–0	0–1	2–2	0–1	1–1	1–1		3–2
Yate Town	3–1	1–0	3–1	0–0	0–3	1–3	2–1	0–2	0–1	2–2	0–2	1–2	2–3	2–1	2–1	4–0	2–3	2–4	2–4	0–0	0–0	

Source: Southern Football League
Legend: Blue = home team win; Yellow = draw; Red = away team win.

=== Stadia and locations ===
Locations of the Premier Division clubs

Club	Stadium	Capacity
Banbury United	Spencer Stadium	2,000
Bashley	Bashley Road	2,000
Bedford Town	The Eyrie	3,000
Brackley Town	St. James Park	3,500
Cambridge City	City Ground	2,300
Chippenham Town	Hardenhuish Park	2,815
Clevedon Town	Hand Stadium	3,500
Corby Town	Steel Park	3,893
Evesham United	St George's Lane (groundshare with Worcester City)	3,000
Farnborough	Cherrywood Road	7,000
Gloucester City	The Corinium Stadium (groundshare with Cirencester Town)	4,500
Halesowen Town	The Grove	5,000
Hemel Hempstead Town	Vauxhall Road	3,152
Hitchin Town	Top Field	4,000
Mangotsfield United	Cossham Street	2,500
Merthyr Tydfil	Penydarren Park	4,500
Oxford City	Court Place Farm	2,000
Rugby Town	Butlin Road	6,000
Stourbridge	War Memorial Athletic Ground	2,626
Swindon Supermarine	Hunts Copse Ground	3,000
Tiverton Town	Ladysmead	3,500
Yate Town	Lodge Road	2,000

== Division One Midlands ==
Division One Midlands consisted of 22 clubs, including 14 clubs from previous season and eight new clubs:

- Three clubs transferred from Isthmian League Division North:
  - AFC Sudbury
  - Arlesey Town
  - Bury Town
- Plus:
  - Atherstone Town, promoted from the Midland Alliance
  - Bromsgrove Rovers, relegated from the Premier Division
  - Marlow, transferred from Division South & West
  - Nuneaton Town, demoted from the Conference South
  - Soham Town Rangers, promoted from the Eastern Counties League

Nuneaton Borough, finished 7th in the Conference North went into liquidation due to financial difficulties, were immediately reformed under the name Nuneaton Town and placed two divisions below in Midlands division.

Leamington won the division in the second attempt and got a place in Premier Division along with play-off winners Nuneaton Town. Dunstable and Malvern finished bottom of the table and were relegated to the lower leagues. At the end of the season Division One Midlands was renamed Division One Central.

=== League table ===
Southern Football League Division One Midlands
- Season: 2008–09
- Champions: Leamington
- Promoted: Leamington; Nuneaton Town
- Relegated: Dunstable Town; Malvern Town
- Matches: 462
- Goals: 1,344 (2.91 per match)
- Top goalscorer: Mark Bellingham (Leamington) - 45
- Biggest home win: Marlow 9 – 1 Malvern Town, 27 September 2008 Bury Town 8 – 0 Rothwell Town, 10 March 2009 Leamington 8 – 0 Malvern Town, 18 April 2009
- Biggest away win: Woodford United 0 – 8 Sutton Coldfield Town, 11 October 2008
- Highest scoring: Marlow 9 – 1 Malvern Town, 27 September 2008; Dunstable Town 3 – 7 Bury Town, 20 January 2009
- Highest attendance: 2302 (Bedworth United 1 – 2 Nuneaton Town, 27 December 2008)
- Lowest attendance: 30 (Malvern Town 2 – 2 Barton Rovers, 17 March 2009)
- Average attendance: 234

Pos	Team	Pld	W	D	L	GF	GA	GD	Pts	Promotion or relegation
1	Leamington	42	32	5	5	114	44	+70	101	Promoted to the Premier Division
2	Nuneaton Town	42	28	8	6	85	31	+54	92	Qualified for the play-offs, then promoted to the Premier Division
3	Atherstone Town	42	24	13	5	82	45	+37	85	Qualified for the play-offs
4	Chasetown	42	25	9	8	67	31	+36	84	Qualified for the play-offs, then transferred to NPL Division One South
5	Chesham United	42	22	10	10	70	38	+32	76	Qualified for the play-offs
6	Sutton Coldfield Town	42	24	4	14	79	62	+17	76	
7	Bury Town	42	22	9	11	88	41	+47	75	
8	Leighton Town	42	18	13	11	57	46	+11	67	
9	Marlow	42	19	9	14	65	53	+12	66	
10	Aylesbury United	42	19	7	16	65	58	+7	64	
11	Romulus	42	17	10	15	60	42	+18	61	
12	AFC Sudbury	42	17	10	15	66	65	+1	61	
13	Bromsgrove Rovers	42	15	8	19	58	53	+5	53	
14	Bedworth United	42	14	7	21	50	66	−16	49	
15	Soham Town Rangers	42	13	7	22	48	79	−31	46	
16	Stourport Swifts	42	10	10	22	46	74	−28	40	
17	Barton Rovers	42	12	4	26	50	79	−29	40	
18	Arlesey Town	42	11	5	26	40	70	−30	38	
19	Rothwell Town	42	8	12	22	35	79	−44	36	
20	Woodford United	42	9	7	26	38	80	−42	34	
21	Dunstable Town	42	11	3	28	54	89	−35	23 (Note: Dunstable Town deducted 13 points deducted for fielding an ineligible player and other irregularities (Subject to Right of Appeal))	Relegated to the Spartan South Midlands League
22	Malvern Town	42	2	10	30	27	119	−92	16	Relegated to the Midland Alliance

Source: fchd.com
Rules for classification: 1) points; 2) goal difference; 3) number of goals scored.

=== Play-offs ===
Semifinals
2	Nuneaton Town	2
5	Chesham United	1
3	Atherstone Town	0
4	Chasetown	5

Final
2	Nuneaton Town	1
4	Chasetown	0

=== Results ===
Home \ Away	SUD	ARL	ATH	AYL	BAR	BWU	BRO	BUR	CHA	CHE	DUN	LEA	LEI	MAL	MAR	NUN	ROM	RTH	SOH	SPS	SUT	WFU
AFC Sudbury		0–0	0–3	2–2	4–2	2–1	2–1	1–1	2–0	1–0	4–2	0–4	1–1	0–0	1–2	1–1	1–1	1–2	3–1	1–1	2–0	0–1
Arlesey Town	2–3		0–1	2–0	1–3	1–2	1–2	3–2	0–0	0–2	3–2	1–4	0–2	1–2	0–1	1–3	1–0	3–0	0–1	0–1	0–2	2–0
Atherstone Town	2–0	3–3		3–5	5–0	1–0	2–0	2–0	2–1	3–3	2–1	0–0	1–1	7–1	1–1	0–2	2–2	5–0	2–0	1–1	3–2	2–2
Aylesbury United	0–3	1–0	1–1		0–1	1–3	1–2	1–2	3–0	2–1	4–0	1–2	0–0	5–1	0–3	0–4	2–1	2–0	4–1	1–0	3–0	1–0
Barton Rovers	3–2	1–2	0–1	1–2		1–3	1–1	1–2	1–1	0–1	3–0	0–2	1–2	0–0	3–1	2–1	3–2	0–1	1–2	2–5	2–3	0–1
Bedworth United	3–4	1–0	1–4	1–1	0–2		0–1	0–4	1–0	1–3	3–0	1–1	0–1	3–0	0–3	1–2	0–2	1–0	1–0	1–1	2–3	3–3
Bromsgrove Rovers	2–0	5–0	0–1	3–1	1–0	4–1		0–1	1–2	1–2	2–0	1–3	0–1	2–1	0–2	0–4	0–0	2–1	0–2	7–0	2–0	1–2
Bury Town	2–0	1–0	1–1	1–0	0–2	0–1	0–0		2–0	0–1	3–1	2–2	4–0	7–0	1–0	0–1	1–1	8–0	5–0	7–2	0–2	2–0
Chasetown	3–1	0–0	0–2	2–1	2–1	2–0	2–1	3–0		0–0	1–3	2–0	0–0	4–0	4–1	1–1	3–0	2–0	0–0	4–1	1–2	1–0
Chesham United	3–2	3–1	0–1	2–3	8–1	0–0	1–1	2–2	0–2		2–1	1–2	2–1	3–0	3–3	0–0	0–1	0–0	1–0	2–1	0–1	4–0
Dunstable Town	1–3	4–0	1–2	2–1	4–2	2–0	3–1	3–7	0–1	0–1		0–4	2–4	4–0	1–1	0–1	3–2	3–2	2–3	0–0	0–1	2–0
Leamington	3–5	3–1	3–0	1–2	4–1	4–1	2–0	2–1	1–3	2–0	2–0		3–3	8–0	7–2	2–1	2–1	1–0	3–1	1–0	0–3	7–1
Leighton Town	3–0	2–0	0–0	1–0	1–0	2–1	1–1	0–1	1–1	0–1	1–1	2–5		3–0	2–0	0–1	1–1	3–0	2–0	1–3	0–0	1–0
Malvern Town	1–2	0–1	1–3	1–1	2–2	2–0	0–4	1–1	0–3	1–4	0–1	0–3	2–2		1–1	0–3	0–2	0–0	1–2	1–2	0–2	1–1
Marlow	1–0	1–0	3–1	0–4	2–1	1–0	2–1	0–0	1–2	1–0	2–0	0–1	0–1	9–1		1–1	1–1	2–0	2–0	0–0	1–0	0–2
Nuneaton Town	3–1	4–1	2–2	3–0	2–0	0–0	2–1	4–1	1–1	0–1	6–1	0–2	2–1	3–1	2–4		2–0	0–1	2–0	3–1	3–0	2–0
Romulus	2–0	3–2	1–1	0–1	0–1	3–0	2–0	1–2	0–1	0–0	3–0	1–2	2–0	7–0	2–1	0–2		1–0	2–2	1–1	3–0	1–2
Rothwell Town	1–1	2–2	1–2	1–1	1–0	1–3	2–2	0–7	1–2	0–1	3–2	0–6	3–1	0–0	2–0	2–2	0–2		1–2	3–1	1–1	1–1
Soham Town Rangers	3–3	0–1	2–1	1–1	2–0	3–3	1–0	0–2	0–3	1–3	3–2	2–3	3–4	4–2	1–1	0–2	0–3	1–0		1–3	0–1	0–3
Stourport Swifts	0–1	2–0	1–2	1–2	2–3	0–2	0–0	1–1	0–2	1–1	1–0	1–2	0–2	2–1	2–1	0–4	0–1	1–1	1–2		1–2	2–3
Sutton Coldfield Town	1–4	1–2	1–2	4–2	2–0	0–3	3–3	2–1	0–3	0–5	2–0	3–3	2–1	5–2	4–1	1–2	2–1	4–1	4–0	3–1		2–1
Woodford United	0–2	0–2	1–2	1–2	1–2	1–2	1–2	0–3	0–2	1–3	3–0	0–2	2–2	2–0	0–6	0–1	0–1	0–0	1–1	1–2	0–8	

Source: Southern Football League
Legend: Blue = home team win; Yellow = draw; Red = away team win.

=== Stadia and locations ===
Locations of Division One Midlands clubs

Club	Stadium	Capacity
AFC Sudbury	King's Marsh	3,800
Arlesey Town	Hitchin Road	2,920
Atherstone Town	Sheepy Road	3,500
Aylesbury United	The Meadow (groundshare with Chesham United)	5,000
Barton Rovers	Sharpenhoe Road	4,000
Bedworth United	The Oval	3,000
Bromsgrove Rovers	Victoria Ground	4,893
Bury Town	Ram Meadow	3,500
Chasetown	The Scholars Ground	2,000
Chesham United	The Meadow	5,000
Dunstable Town	Creasey Park	3,200
Leamington	New Windmill Ground	3,000
Leighton Town	Bell Close	2,800
Malvern Town	Langland Stadium	2,500
Marlow	Alfred Davis Memorial Ground	3,000
Nuneaton Borough	Liberty Way	4,614
Romulus	The Central Ground (groundshare with Sutton Coldfield Town)	2,000
Rothwell Town	Cecil Street	3,500
Soham Town Rangers	Julius Martin Lane	2,000
Stourport Swifts	Walshes Meadow	2,000
Sutton Coldfield Town	The Central Ground	2,000
Woodford United	Byfield Road	3,000

== Division One South & West ==
Division One South & West consisted of 22 clubs, including 15 clubs from previous season and seven new clubs:

- AFC Totton, promoted from the Wessex League
- Beaconsfield SYCOB, promoted from the Spartan South Midlands League
- Bishops Cleeve, transferred from Midlands Division
- Cinderford Town, transferred from Midlands Division
- Cirencester Town, relegated from Premier Division
- North Leigh, promoted from the Hellenic League
- Truro City, promoted from the Western League

Truro City won the division in an inaugural season and got a place in Premier Division along with play-off winners Didcot Town. Bracknell Town finished second bottom but were reprieved from relegation due to higher league clubs' problems. Winchester City finished bottom of the table and were relegated to the lower league.

=== League table ===
Southern Football League Division One South & West
- Season: 2008–09
- Champions: Truro City
- Promoted: Truro City; Didcot Town
- Relegated: Winchester City
- Matches: 462
- Goals: 1,521 (3.29 per match)
- Top goalscorer: Stewart Yetton (Truro City) - 31
- Biggest home win: AFC Totton 6 – 0 AFC Hayes, 18 August 2008 Didcot Town 6 – 0 Bishops Cleeve, 27 September 2008 Bridgwater Town 6 – 0 Slough Town, 26 March 2009
- Biggest away win: Andover 1 – 9 Truro City, 4 November 2008
- Highest scoring: Andover 1 – 9 Truro City, 4 November 2008
- Highest attendance: 1119 (Truro City 4 – 2 Windsor & Eton, 24 March 2009)
- Lowest attendance: 27 (AFC Hayes 4 – 3 Gosport Borough, 27 January 2009)
- Average attendance: 171

Pos	Team	Pld	W	D	L	GF	GA	GD	Pts	Promotion or relegation
1	Truro City	42	29	8	5	120	49	+71	95	Promoted to the Premier Division
2	Windsor & Eton	42	26	7	9	77	44	+33	85	Qualified for the play-offs
3	AFC Totton	42	23	13	6	89	39	+50	82	Qualified for the play-offs
4	Beaconsfield SYCOB	42	24	9	9	77	44	+33	81	Qualified for the play-offs, then transferred to Division One Central
5	Didcot Town	42	21	10	11	91	52	+39	73	Qualified for the play-offs, then promoted to the Premier Division
6	Thatcham Town	42	20	8	14	74	58	+16	68	
7	Bridgwater Town	42	19	8	15	69	56	+13	65	
8	North Leigh	42	17	10	15	68	64	+4	61	
9	A.F.C. Hayes	42	18	7	17	80	92	−12	61	
10	Paulton Rovers	42	16	10	16	65	62	+3	58	
11	Cinderford Town	42	15	11	16	71	75	−4	56	
12	Gosport Borough	42	15	10	17	64	67	−3	55	
13	Uxbridge	42	15	9	18	76	72	+4	54	
14	Cirencester Town	42	14	10	18	78	79	−1	52	
15	Abingdon United	42	15	7	20	63	77	−14	52	
16	Slough Town	42	11	12	19	62	91	−29	45	Transferred to the Division One Central
17	Burnham	42	12	9	21	52	83	−31	45	Transferred to the Division One Central
18	Bishop's Cleeve	42	10	13	19	51	71	−20	43	
19	Andover	42	10	12	20	58	102	−44	42	
20	Taunton Town	42	9	9	24	50	85	−35	36	
21	Bracknell Town	42	9	8	25	39	75	−36	35	Reprieved from relegation
22	Winchester City	42	10	8	24	47	84	−37	35 (Note: Winchester were docked 3 points for fielding an ineligible player.)	Relegated to the Wessex League

Source: fchd.com
Rules for classification: 1) points; 2) goal difference; 3) number of goals scored.

=== Play-offs ===
Semifinals
2	Windsor & Eton	0
5	Didcot Town	2
3	A.F.C. Totton	2
4	Beaconsfield SYCOB	1

Final
3	A.F.C. Totton	1
5	Didcot Town	2

=== Results ===
Home \ Away	ABI	HAY	TOT	AND	BEA	BIS	BNT	BRI	BUR	CIN	CIR	DID	GOS	NOR	PAU	SLO	TAU	THA	TRU	UXB	WCC	W&E
Abingdon United		3–1	2–1	0–2	1–2	1–0	2–0	2–1	1–2	0–2	3–2	2–2	4–1	1–1	2–0	1–1	2–1	1–3	1–4	1–2	0–2	2–0
A.F.C. Hayes	4–4		1–1	4–1	3–1	2–1	1–2	1–4	3–2	0–0	4–3	0–3	4–3	0–4	2–2	2–1	5–2	4–2	1–7	1–3	5–1	0–1
AFC Totton	4–1	6–0		3–1	0–0	5–0	3–1	3–0	1–1	3–3	2–0	3–1	3–3	4–0	2–3	4–2	3–0	3–2	0–2	3–2	4–1	1–1
Andover	1–2	2–2	0–0		2–1	1–1	2–2	2–1	2–2	0–2	2–0	0–5	1–2	0–3	3–5	1–2	4–3	1–6	1–9	0–3	3–1	0–3
Beaconsfield Town	4–0	3–2	2–0	4–0		3–1	4–0	1–0	3–0	3–1	2–3	1–1	0–0	4–3	2–1	0–0	4–0	2–3	2–0	1–0	1–0	1–1
Bishop's Cleeve	0–3	2–2	1–1	0–2	1–2		1–2	2–0	2–0	1–2	1–2	2–2	1–0	0–0	4–3	0–4	2–0	1–0	0–1	3–1	4–0	0–1
Bracknell Town	1–0	2–0	0–1	1–1	1–2	3–1		2–1	1–2	1–2	0–2	0–1	0–0	0–1	0–3	0–0	0–1	0–4	1–3	5–1	1–1	3–2
Bridgwater Town	2–0	3–1	1–2	2–1	3–2	0–0	3–0		3–0	2–2	2–2	1–1	1–2	1–0	1–1	6–0	1–2	2–1	1–1	3–2	3–0	0–2
Burnham	4–1	1–1	0–5	1–1	0–1	0–0	1–0	0–1		2–0	4–0	0–3	1–1	0–6	1–0	3–0	3–3	1–3	2–6	1–1	1–0	0–2
Cinderford Town	1–3	2–3	0–2	5–0	1–1	3–3	3–2	0–4	1–2		2–1	2–1	2–3	1–3	0–0	4–1	1–1	2–2	1–4	1–4	4–0	1–5
Cirencester Town	2–2	1–2	2–4	3–3	0–1	5–2	0–0	2–2	2–3	1–2		2–1	1–1	4–1	1–2	4–1	2–0	4–3	2–5	3–2	3–0	3–1
Didcot Town	5–4	4–0	0–1	3–1	3–3	6–0	3–0	1–2	6–2	0–2	0–0		1–0	2–1	3–0	2–0	5–0	0–0	3–4	1–1	2–2	0–1
Gosport Borough	2–2	0–3	2–0	1–1	1–2	1–4	1–2	5–0	2–1	2–1	0–3	1–3		3–1	1–0	2–1	4–1	1–0	2–4	0–1	1–2	1–2
North Leigh	2–0	2–1	0–2	3–1	1–0	1–1	2–0	2–4	3–0	1–1	2–1	0–3	2–1		1–2	6–1	1–1	0–4	0–1	1–0	1–0	0–1
Paulton Rovers	2–0	2–1	0–0	2–2	2–1	3–2	3–2	0–1	2–4	2–3	3–1	1–2	1–3	4–1		1–2	3–2	0–1	0–1	2–1	2–1	0–1
Slough Town	0–3	2–3	0–0	4–3	2–2	1–1	0–0	2–1	2–2	2–3	3–2	2–3	2–1	1–1	1–0		2–2	1–1	3–3	1–2	4–0	3–2
Taunton Town	2–2	1–4	0–1	1–2	0–2	1–0	2–1	1–2	3–0	0–2	1–1	1–0	1–1	2–2	2–2	2–3		1–2	1–3	1–0	3–0	1–3
Thatcham Town	1–3	2–0	0–5	1–1	4–2	1–1	3–2	1–0	1–0	2–0	3–1	1–1	4–2	1–2	0–2	3–1	3–1		0–5	1–0	3–0	1–2
Truro City	4–0	3–1	0–0	4–0	1–2	0–0	4–0	3–1	3–0	3–2	1–1	2–4	1–3	2–2	1–1	2–1	3–0	0–0		3–2	5–0	4–2
Uxbridge	2–0	2–3	2–2	2–3	1–3	3–3	5–0	1–2	3–2	1–1	2–2	3–2	1–1	3–3	1–1	4–0	1–0	1–0	5–2		1–4	0–2
Winchester City	3–1	1–2	0–0	1–2	1–0	0–2	1–1	1–1	2–1	3–2	1–3	1–2	0–1	2–2	1–1	3–1	1–2	1–1	1–2	3–2		1–2
Windsor & Eton	1–0	0–1	2–1	2–2	0–0	3–0	2–0	2–0	2–0	1–1	3–1	3–0	2–2	4–0	1–1	6–2	2–1	1–0	0–4	1–2	2–4	

Source: Southern Football League
Legend: Blue = home team win; Yellow = draw; Red = away team win.

=== Stadia and locations ===
Locations of Division One South & West clubs

Club	Stadium	Capacity
A.F.C. Hayes	Farm Park	1,500
AFC Totton	Testwood Stadium	3,000
Abingdon United	Northcourt Road	2,000
Andover	Portway Stadium	3,000
Beaconsfield SYCOB	Holloways Park	3,500
Bishops Cleeve	Kayte Lane	1,500
Bracknell Town	Larges Lane	2,500
Bridgwater Town	Fairfax Park	2,500
Burnham	The Gore	2,500
Cinderford Town	Causeway Ground	3,500
Cirencester Town	Corinium Stadium	4,500
Didcot Town	Draycott Engineering Loop Meadow Stadium	3,000
Gosport Borough	Privett Park	4,500
North Leigh	Eynsham Hall Park Sports Ground	2,000
Paulton Rovers	Athletic Field	2,500
Slough Town	Holloways Park (groundshare with Beaconsfield SYCOB)	3,500
Taunton Town	Wordsworth Drive	2,500
Thatcham Town	Waterside Park	1,500
Truro City	Treyew Road	3,200
Uxbridge	Honeycroft	3,770
Winchester City	The City Ground	4,500
Windsor & Eton	Stag Meadow	4,500

== League Cup ==
2008–09 Southern League Cup
Tournament details
- Country: England
- Teams: 66

Final positions
- Champions: Atherstone Town
- Runners-up: Bridgwater Town

=== Preliminary round ===
Tie	Home team (tier)	Score	Away team (tier)	Att.
1	Chippenham Town (P)	2–2	Oxford City (P)	
Chippenham Town won 5–4 on penalties
2	Sutton Coldfield Town (M)	1–1	Halesowen Town (P)	
Halesowen Town won 6–5 on penalties

=== First round ===
Tie	Home team (tier)	Score	Away team (tier)	Att.
3	Abingdon United (SW)	1–1	Banbury United (P)	
Abingdon United won 5–3 on penalties
4	Andover (SW)	2–2	Farnborough (P)	
Andover won 3–0 on penalties
5	Atherstone Town (M)	2–2	Nuneaton Town (M)	
Atherstone Town won 4–3 on penalties
6	Aylesbury United (M)	3–0	Burnham (SW)	
7	Barton Rovers (M)	0–3	Dunstable Town (M)	
8	Beaconsfield SYCOB (SW)	4–1	Marlow (M)	
9	Bracknell Town (SW)	0-1	Windsor & Eton (SW)	
10	Bridgwater Town (SW)	4–3	Taunton Town (SW)	
11	Bromsgrove Rovers (M)	0-1	Romulus (M)	
12	Bury Town (M)	2–0	A.F.C. Sudbury (M)	
13	Chasetown (M)	1–3	Leamington (M)	
14	Chippenham Town (P)	1–3	Brackley Town (P)	
15	Corby Town (P)	0–1	Rothwell Town (M)	
16	Didcot Town (SW)	1–2	Swindon Supermarine (P)	
17	Evesham United (P)	0–3	Gloucester City (P)	

Tie	Home team (tier)	Score	Away team (tier)	Att.
18	Gosport Borough (SW)	1–0	A.F.C. Totton (SW)	
19	Halesowen Town (P)	1–0	Stourbridge (P)	
20	Hemel Hempstead Town (P)	3–0	Bedford Town (P)	
21	Hitchin Town (P)	4–0	Arlesey Town (M)	
22	Leighton Town (M)	3–0	Slough Town (SW)	
23	Malvern Town (M)	1–2	Cirencester Town (SW)	
24	Mangotsfield United (P)	3–1	Clevedon Town (P)	
25	Merthyr Tydfil (P)	4–2	Bishops Cleeve (SW)	
26	Paulton Rovers (SW)	0–1	Yate Town (P)	
27	Rugby Town (P)	1–2	Bedworth United (M)	
28	Soham Town Rangers (M)	3–4	Cambridge City (P)	
29	Stourport Swifts (M)	3–4	Cinderford Town (SW)	
30	Thatcham Town (SW)	2-4	Chesham United (M)	
31	Tiverton Town (P)	3–4	Truro City (SW)	
32	Uxbridge (SW)	3–4	A.F.C. Hayes (SW)	
33	Winchester City (SW)	3–4	Bashley (P)	
34	Woodford United (M)	0–1	North Leigh (SW)	

=== Second round ===
Tie	Home team (tier)	Score	Away team (tier)	Att.
35	A.F.C. Hayes (SW)	2–4	Chesham United (M)	
36	Andover (SW)	2–1	Bashley (P)	
37	Atherstone Town (M)	2–1	Leamington (M)	
38	Brackley Town (P)	3–2	Romulus (M)	
39	Cinderford Town (SW)	4–3	Merthyr Tydfil (P)	
40	Gloucester City (P)	3–0	Abingdon United (SW)	
41	Hitchin Town (P)	1–0	Cambridge City (P)	
42	Gosport Borough (SW)	1–2	Beaconsfield SYCOB (SW)	

Tie	Home team (tier)	Score	Away team (tier)	Att.
43	Hemel Hempstead Town (P)	4–4	Dunstable Town (M)	
Dunstable Town won 5–4 on penalties
44	Leighton Town (M)	1–3	Bury Town (M)	
45	Mangotsfield United (P)	1–2	Yate Town (P)	
46	North Leigh (SW)	4–0	Rothwell Town (M)	
47	Bedworth United (M)	0–2	Halesowen Town (P)	
48	Aylesbury United (M)	1–2	Windsor & Eton (SW)	
49	Swindon Supermarine (P)	1–0	Cirencester Town (SW)	
50	Truro City (SW)	0–3	Bridgwater Town (SW)	

=== Third round ===
Tie	Home team (tier)	Score	Away team (tier)	Att.
51	Brackley Town (P)	3–0	North Leigh (SW)	
52	Bury Town (M)	2–0	Hitchin Town (P)	
53	Chesham United (M)	4–1	Beaconsfield SYCOB (SW)	
54	Cinderford Town (SW)	2–2	Bridgwater Town (SW)	
Bridgwater Town won 5–3 on penalties

Tie	Home team (tier)	Score	Away team (tier)	Att.
55	Dunstable Town (M)	1–2	Windsor & Eton (SW)	
56	Gloucester City (P)	3–0	Yate Town (P)	
57	Halesowen Town (P)	0–2	Atherstone Town (SW)	
58	Andover (SW)	2–6	Swindon Supermarine (P)	

=== Quarterfinals ===
Tie	Home team (tier)	Score	Away team (tier)	Att.
59	Atherstone Town (M)	2–0	Brackley Town (P)	
60	Bridgwater Town (SW)	2–1	Gloucester City (P)	

Tie	Home team (tier)	Score	Away team (tier)	Att.
61	Bury Town (M)	3–1	Chesham United (M)	
62	Swindon Supermarine (P)	3–0	Windsor & Eton (SW)	

=== Semifinals ===
Tie	Home team (tier)	Score	Away team (tier)	Att.
63	Atherstone Town (M)	2–2	Bury Town (M)	
Atherstone Town won 3–1 on penalties
64	Bridgwater Town (SW)	3–0	Swindon Supermarine (P)	

=== Final ===
Tie	Home team (tier)	Score	Away team (tier)	Att.
First Leg
65	Atherstone Town (M)	2–1	Bridgwater Town (SW)	
Second Leg
66	Bridgwater Town (SW)	1–3	Atherstone Town (M)	
Atherstone Town won 5–2 on aggregate

== See also ==
- Southern Football League
- 2008–09 Isthmian League
- 2008–09 Northern Premier League
