= Truro City F.C. =

Association football club in Cornwall, United Kingdom

Coordinates: 50°16′03.19″N 5°07′24.57″W

Truro City
- Full name: Truro City Football Club
- Nickname: The Tinners
- Founded: 1889; 137 years ago
- Ground: Truro City Stadium, Threemilestone
- Capacity: 3,000
- Chairman: Robin Karkeek
- Manager: John Askey
- League: National League South
- 2025–26: National League, 24th of 24 (relegated)
- Website: trurocity.co.uk
Home colours	Away colours	Third colours

Truro City Football Club (Cornish: Klub Pel Droos Cita Truru) is an English professional football club based in Truro, Cornwall. They currently play in the National League South, the sixth tier of the English football league system.

They were founding members of the South Western League in 1951 and won the title five times in their history. Apart from a three-season spell in the 1970s, when they played in the Cornwall Combination after losing their ground as part of a by-pass development, they remained in the South Western League until 2006, when they joined the Western Football League, achieving promotion from Division One to the Premier Division in their first season. The club had previously played in what was known as the Conference South in 2011, following five promotions in six seasons. They were relegated at the end of the 2012–13 season after going into administration, but returned to that level, now known as the National League South, in 2015, before being relegated back to the Southern League in 2019. They are the highest ranked club from Cornwall, and as such Truro City are the first ever Cornish team to achieve the feat of reaching the fifth tier.

Truro were FA Cup regulars throughout the 1950s, but subsequently they were sporadic entrants until a permanent return to the competition in the 2006–07 season, their first appearance in 13 years, then in 2017 they reached the first round for the first time in their history losing away to Charlton Athletic. They also won the FA Vase that season.

== History ==
=== Early years ===
In 1889 Truro City became one of the founding members of the Cornwall County Football Association (CCFA). Later in 1889, they played their first game at Truro School against Penzance, winning 7–1. They then switched to Tolgarrick for their future games. Six years later in 1895, they won their first silverware, the Cornwall Senior Cup, beating Launceston 5–0.

In the 1930s Truro left Cornish football for a time, joining the Plymouth and District League, which they went on to win in 1936–37. However, as a result of this switch, they were barred from competing the Cornwall Senior Cup, although were later re-admitted in 1938.

Truro were founding members of the South Western League in 1951, but stumbled in the initial years, requiring re-election in both of their first two seasons to remain in the league and were also forced to drop down to the Cornwall Combination league between 1975 and 1978 after losing their home ground due to road widening. After returning to the South Western League in 1978, the club required a further two re-elections in 1982 and 1983 to remain in the league. However they did enjoy some success during their time in the South Western League, going on to win five championships, including a notable successful period throughout the 1990s, winning titles in 1992–93, 1995–96 and most recently in 1997–98.

=== The 2000s ===
At the start of the new millennium, the club entered a period of decline, both on and off the pitch, with mounting financial issues and stagnating performances which saw them finish amongst the bottom clubs of the South Western League for several consecutive seasons. City's fortunes changed in 2004 when the club was purchased by a local property developer, Kevin Heaney. The new ownership immediately cleared all debts and set their sights on propelling Truro up the non-league pyramid and establishing them as the first professional Cornish-based football team in the National Football Conference.

In the 2005–06 season, they finished runners-up in the South Western League and were promoted to the Western League Division One for the first time in their history, and went on to become champions at the first attempt with an impressive season record of 37 wins, 4 draws and only 1 loss. City also enjoyed a successful run in the 2006–07 FA Vase competition, beating AFC Totton 3–1 in the final and becoming the first Cornish football club to win a national trophy. The final was notable as only the second match to be held at the newly constructed Wembley Stadium and took place in front of an FA Vase record crowd of 36,232 fans.

In their first season in the Western League Premier Division, Truro gained promotion to the Southern League at the first attempt, and became the first Cornish side ever to play in the Southern League, only three promotions from the Football League. They were faced with the longest travelling mileage of any club at their level due to the prevalence of Wiltshire-based clubs in the Western League.

Towards the end of the 2007–08 season, chairman Kevin Heaney issued a statement reversing an earlier decision to turn the club fully professional for the following season, which led to the resignation of boss Dave Leonard. For the remainder of the season, Director of Football Chris Webb took charge, assisted by former boss Dave Newton.

Heaney owned a housing company and despite a slump in the housing market, the club were able to attract many players on higher wages from higher leagues. Heaney had stated he believed that long term, due to the large population catchment area, that Truro City could support a Football League Two club, but he also stated that he was looking to sell the club before they achieve this level. Despite his housing company having gone into liquidation owing £4.5m, he categorically denied claims that his money was drying up and said that he would continue to fund the club's success.

In May 2008 former Plymouth Argyle and Exeter City striker Sean McCarthy was appointed the new Truro manager and the club appointed Dave Newton as his assistant. On 7 December 2009, McCarthy left the club by mutual consent following a 7–2 away defeat to Stourbridge. On 22 December 2009 Truro signed Mangotsfield United midfielder Kyle Tooze, for an undisclosed fee, thought to be in the region of £5,000. On 29 December 2009 Steven Thompson was announced as the new manager with immediate effect, but on 29 March 2010 he left the club by mutual consent after only winning five out of his 18 games in charge, with the chance of reaching the play-offs unrealistic.

=== The 2010s ===
==== Promotion to the sixth tier ====
Lee Hodges was appointed as Thompson's replacement, and had a successful first season in charge as on 23 April 2011, Truro were promoted as champions of the Southern League to the Conference South for the 2011–12 season with one league game remaining after a 3–0 win at Banbury United.

In 2011–12, Truro finished in a respectable 14th place in their first ever season in the Conference South, but financial troubles were to follow.

==== Financial trouble ====
On 25 August 2011, HM Revenue and Customs presented a winding-up petition to the club due to unpaid taxes of over £100,000. Prior to this, chairman Kevin Heaney had to quell rumours of the club being sold. A meeting on 31 October 2011 between the club and HMRC resulted in a postponement of the winding-up process to allow the club until 16 January 2012 to pay their taxes. When the case was called, the Registrar was told that two hours before the hearing the tax debt had been "paid in full." A further winding-up petition was lodged by HMRC in the High Court of Justice (Chancery Division) on 30 March 2012, with a hearing on 30 April 2012 when the club was expected to pay £51,000 to HM Revenue and Customs. When this was not paid, a further extension to 25 June 2012 was granted, but the petition was dismissed when the bill was ultimately settled. Four other parties were also claiming monies amounting to around £700,000, but the club disputed these claims.

Chairman Kevin Heaney stepped down on 24 August 2012 after being declared bankrupt, and he was replaced by vice-chairman Chris Webb. On 31 August, Truro City F.C. filed for administration after the first-team players, who had not been paid during August, informed the club that they would not play against Boreham Wood on 1 September unless this course of action was taken. On 3 September, a further HMRC winding-up order over a tax bill of £15,000 was postponed until 17 September, but this order would be dismissed if the club went into administration, which it did the following day. Ten points were deducted from Truro's total, leaving them bottom of the Conference South table.

On 11 October 2012, Truro City's administrators failed to meet the deadline for the Football Conference's requirement of a £50,000 bond that would enable the club to continue in the Conference South. This bond was to cover the costs of visiting clubs should Truro be liquidated during the season and their results be expunged from the record. A reduced amount was offered by the club, and was refused by the conference. The match at home to Dover Athletic on 13 October was called off, and the club was expected to be expelled from the league with liquidation probably following such an expulsion.

However, on 12 October the conference gave the club another week to pay the bond, in the light of "encouraging" information from the administrator. After a preferred bidder pulled out on the morning of 19 October, the bond remained unpaid and the club was set to be expelled from the Football Conference, but discussions continued and City were reprieved later the same day when two businessmen, Pete Masters and Philip Perryman, paid the £50,000 bond. The pair completed a deal to purchase the club on 14 December 2012.

The new ownership were unable to prevent relegation from the Conference South, and Lee Hodges was not offered a new contract at the end of the season as the club were still unable to afford his wages. On 5 June 2013, a CVA was agreed with the club's creditors, reducing the debt to £80,000 to be paid over three years. This agreement allowed City to begin the 2013–14 season in the Premier Division of the Southern League.

==== Post-administration ====
Hodges was replaced in June 2013 by Steve Massey, returning for his third spell as manager, having been in the post previously between 1992–94 and 2005–06. Massey was sacked on 12 March 2014 with City struggling in 19th place in the Southern League. The following day, Steve Tully was appointed player-manager until the end of the season.

Tully earned the job on a permanent basis, and under his guidance Truro were promoted back to the Conference South, renamed the National League South, after winning the 2014–15 Southern Football League play-off final 1–0 at home to St Neots Town on 4 May 2015.

The 2015–16 season in the National League South would be just the second time Truro had played at that level, where they finished 4th and reached the playoffs, losing to Maidstone United in the semi-finals. The 2016–17 season saw the club do less well, finishing 19th, just one place above the relegation zone. Tully was relieved of his managerial duties and replaced by Lee Hodges, who had only left the club three years prior.

In 2017–18, the club bounced back and finished 7th, which again qualified them for the play-offs, in which they lost 3–1 to Hampton & Richmond Borough in the qualifying-round. That season also saw the club go on an FA Cup run, making the first round proper, where they were beaten 3–1 by Charlton Athletic at The Valley, Tyler Harvey being the Truro goalscorer.

The club's lack of consistency was prominent again in the 2018–19 season, where after just two games long-serving manager Lee Hodges resigned. The club poached Taunton Town manager Leigh Robinson and his assistant Michael Meaker, but they were both dismissed in March 2019, with the club 19th in the league. Paul Wilkinson was named caretaker-manager but the club eventually finished 20th and were relegated to the Southern League. Wilkinson left the club to become manager of EFL League One side Bury.

=== The 2020s ===
==== End of an era ====
The club appointed former Plymouth Argyle player Paul Wotton ahead of the 2019–20 season in what would be his first managerial appointment. Wotton would oversee five seasons of stability and progress at Truro City culminating in a return to the National League South in the 2022–23 season, with a last minute goal securing a 3–2 win in the play-off final against Bracknell Town. Wotton, in his final season at Truro would lead the club to a respectable 16th-place finish in the National League South having dealt with numerous ground-sharing changes, fixture pile-ups and a continued absence of home fixtures in the county.

==== New beginnings ====
Early on in the 2022–23 season (30 November 2023) Truro City saw a change of ownership as the club was purchased by Canadian Consortium "Ontario Inc", with former Cornwall RLFC owner Eric Perez taking the reins as the club's chairman & CEO. On the same day manager Paul Wotton signed a multi-year contract renewal with the club, before seeing out the season, but, on 14 May 2024 he left Truro to become Torquay United's new manager.

Truro City would subsequently appoint John Askey who had enjoyed prior promotion successes at National League and National League North with both Macclesfield and York City respectively. Askey would be tasked with leading the club upon their return to Truro, relocation to their new stadium, and under Ontario's first full season of ownership, all of which signposting significant change at Truro.

The 2024–25 season saw Truro make history by becoming the first club from Cornwall to be promoted to the National League, the fifth tier of English football, following a 5–2 home victory over St Albans City securing to the National League South title on the final day of the season. The season finale saw no less than six teams vying for the title and, although each team in contention won their games, it was Truro City who prevailed, securing the title on goal difference from Torquay United.

The 2025–26 season saw Truro City compete at Step 1 for the first time in their history having turned professional in pre-season 2025–26 season becoming the first Cornish side to achieve professional status. The step up to the National League level ultimately proved too much for Truro who finished bottom of the league suffering relegation back the National League South. The club twice broke the longest distance travelled for any football match in the UK with a 880 mile round trip to Carlisle on 06 September 2025 before breaking the record again with a 920 mile round trip to Gateshead on 25 October 2025.

== Crest and colours ==
=== Crest evolution ===
2005–2013

2013–2019

2019–2024

2024–

=== Kit evolution ===
1956	1964–1965	1965	1969–1970	1988–1989	1995–1996

2002–2003	2005–2006	2010–2011	2023–2024	2024–2025	2025–2027

== Stadium ==
Truro City play at the Truro City Stadium (TCS) located within Truro Sports Hub development in Threemilestone, on the western outskirts of Truro. The club moved into their new stadium for the 2024–25 season coinciding with their return to Truro.

=== History ===
For most of its history, Truro City played its home matches at Treyew Road. The ground had been associated with the club since the early 20th century. Newspaper reports from 1905 indicate that Truro City and Truro Cricket Club explored a joint arrangement to secure the playing fields from Lord Falmouth at a cost of £60 per annum, although no formal agreement is explicitly recorded. Subsequent reports in later years suggest that the ground was ultimately brought into use by the clubs. A covered terrace was in place behind one of the goals until the mid-1970s when a road widening scheme resulted in it being removed. Only in the decades prior to its closure had Truro added to their old stand and erected two new stands on opposite sides of the ground, lifting the capacity to approximately 3,000.

==== Redevelopment plans ====
In 2005 the club announced plans to build a new 16,000-seater stadium in Truro as a new home for the city's football club. However, the £12m plans were opposed by some residents who live near the proposed site at Treyew Road. In 2006, the club revealed plans for a £7m football training complex. The club wanted to build two new pitches and a club house on land in Kenwyn, Truro with a 60-bed hotel and offices at its present Treyew Road base. However, in 2007, Carrick District Council rejected the plans for the new 16,000-seater stadium, a decision which club chairman Kevin Heaney described as a 'major blow'.

In 2011 Cornwall Council started developing a business plan for the proposed Stadium for Cornwall, which would host both Truro City and the Cornish Pirates rugby union team. In 2014, the club sold Treyew Road for redevelopment, with the intention of using the money as their share of the development costs for the planned Stadium for Cornwall. However, in June 2022, Cornwall Council announced that they were withdrawing support for Stadium for Cornwall from the "Levelling Up" programme, and the plans were dropped.

==== Leaving Treyew Road ====
In 2014, the club sold Treyew Road. The club received three extensions allowing them to stay at the ground following its sale, but in the summer of 2018, the development company announced its plans to begin work on the project immediately, forcing Truro City to find a temporary location. Eventually, the club came to an agreement with divisional rivals Torquay United to undertake a groundshare of their Plainmoor stadium, a ground that was 2 hours away from Truro. This agreement created the quirk of away fans outnumbering home fans by more than 50 to 1 when Truro hosted Torquay that season.

In October 2018 it was revealed that the deal with Helical Retail, who were going to redevelop the Treyew Road site into a supermarket, was off. In January 2019, Truro temporarily returned to Treyew Road. with rugby union club Cornish Pirates in future. The Pirates bought Truro in March 2019.

In January 2021 it was announced that the club would finally leave their Treyew Road ground, which was not-long after redeveloped into a supermarket, and groundshare with Plymouth Parkway F.C. at Bolitho Park, Plymouth, until 2022 when the planned Stadium for Cornwall was scheduled to be finished.

In March 2023, following the scrapping of the Stadium for Cornwall, Truro City confirmed the extension of their ground share deal at Plymouth Parkway for the 2023–24 season. In February 2024, that deal was cut short, with regular postponements at Bolitho Park leading Truro to arrange a ground-share until the end of the season with Taunton Town, at their Wordsworth Drive stadium. On 22 March 2024, due to pitch issues at Wordsworth Drive, Truro announced the club would play the remainder of the 2023–24 season at Gloucester City's Meadow Park.

==== Returning to Truro ====
The start of the 2024–25 season saw the club finally return home to Truro, following several seasons ground-sharing predominately outside of Cornwall, by moving into a new purpose-built facility Truro City Stadium (TCS). The new stadium forms part of a wider development within the Truro Sports Hub comprising the TCS and training facilities including an all-weather pitch for the use of the club, other local sports clubs and wider community.

Truro City played their first game at the Truro City Stadium against Dorking Wanderers in a season opener on 10 August 2024 – the club's first game in Cornwall since October 2020. Truro City were defeated 2–1 in a game notable for the visitors playing with their shirts inside-out to overcome a clash of shirts.

Ground improvements were undertaken ahead of the 2025–26 season including widening of the north stand to approximately 3 times its original size and the relocation of 2 No. uncovered terracing stands from either side of the north stand to behind the west goal with the addition of new roof coverings.

== Players ==
=== Current squad ===
As of 1 October 2026

Note: Flags indicate national team as defined under FIFA eligibility rules; some limited exceptions apply. Players may hold more than one non-FIFA nationality.

No.	Pos.	Nation	Player
1	GK	ENG	Dan Lavercombe
2	DF	WAL	Zac Bell
3	DF	ENG	Connor Riley-Lowe (captain)
4	MF	ENG	Will Dean
5	DF	ENG	Tom Harrison
6	DF	IRL	Shaun Donnellan
7	MF	IRL	Yassine En-Neyah
8	MF	ENG	Dan Rooney
9	FW	ENG	Tyler Harvey (vice-captain)
10	FW	ENG	Omar Bogle
11	FW	ENG	Zyan Blake (on loan from Nottingham Forest)
12	DF	ENG	Christian Oxlade-Chamberlain
14	MF	ENG	Lirak Hasani
15	FW	WAL	Luke Jephcott

No.	Pos.	Nation	Player
16	DF	ENG	Tylor Love-Holmes
17	DF	ENG	Lewis Colwell
18	DF	ENG	Jack Matthews
19	MF	ENG	Jack Nunn
20	DF	ENG	Ryan Law
21	FW	ENG	Harvey Greenslade
22	FW	ENG	Jack Stretton
23	MF	TAN	Ben Starkie
24	GK	ENG	Aidan Stone
26	DF	ENG	Max Kinsey
33	MF	ENG	Tom Dean (on loan from Exeter City)
37	FW	WAL	Tom Tweedy
—	MF	ENG	Billy Palfrey
—	FW	ENG	Louis Dennis

=== Out on loan ===
Note: Flags indicate national team as defined under FIFA eligibility rules; some limited exceptions apply. Players may hold more than one non-FIFA nationality.

No.	Pos.	Nation	Player

== Club officials ==
Position	Name
Chairman & CEO:	Robin Karkeek
Director:	Andrew Unger
Director of Football:	Alex Black
Head of Commercial & Club Secretary:	Rob Butland
Club Administrator & Matchday Operations Lead:	Amy Horton
Safeguarding Lead:	Jenny Blazon
Matchday Secretary:	Deba Sidhu
Head of Media & Communications:	Gareth Davies

=== First-team coaches ===
Position	Name
Manager:	John Askey
Assistant Manager:	Stewart Yetton
Goalkeeping Coach & Kitman:	Phil Osborn
Sports Therapist:	Joe Whittaker
Assistant Therapist:	Issey Aspen
Kit Assistant:	Adam Carpenter

== Honours ==
League

- National League South (level 6)
  - Champions: 2024–25
- Southern League Premier (level 7)
  - Champions: 2010–11
  - Play-off winners: 2015, 2023
- Southern League Division One (level 8)
  - Champions: 2008–09
- Western League Premier (level 9)
  - Champions: 2007–08
- Western League Division One (level 10)
  - Champions: 2006–07
- South Western League
  - Champions (5): 1960–61, 1969–70, 1992–93, 1995–96, 1997–98

Cup

- FA Vase
  - Winners: 2006–07
- South Western League Cup
  - Winners: 1959–60, 1966–67 (joint), 1992–93
- Cornwall Senior Cup
  - Winners (17): 1894–95, 1901–02, 1902–03, 1910–11, 1923–24, 1926–27, 1927–28, 1929-30 (shared), 1937–38, 1958–59, 1966–67, 1969–70, 1994–95, 1997–98, 2005–06, 2006–07, 2007–08
- Durning Lawrence Cornwall Charity Cup
  - Winners (11): 1911–12, 1912–13, 1919–20, 1925–26, 1928–29, 1929–30, 1930–31, 1932–33, 1949–50, 1964–65, 1980–81

== Records ==
- Highest league position: 1st, National League South, 2024–25
- Best FA Cup performance: First round, 2017–18
- Best FA Trophy performance: Third round, 2020–21, 2021–22, 2025-26
- Best FA Vase performance: Winners, 2006–07
- Most League goals in a season (by team): 185 (2006–07, Western Football League Division One, 42 games)
- Most League points in a season: 115 (2006–07, Western Football League Division One, 42 games)
