= 2008–09 Western Football League =

Western Football League
- Season: 2008–09

The 2008–09 Western Football League season (known as the 2008–09 Toolstation Western Football League for sponsorship reasons) was the 107th in the history of the Western Football League, a football competition in England. Teams were divided into two divisions; the Premier and the First.

The league champions for the first time in their history were Bitton, although it was runners-up Frome Town who took promotion to the Southern League. The champions of Division One were Larkhall Athletic.

== Premier Division ==
The Premier Division featured two new clubs in a league of 21 after Truro City were promoted to the Southern League, and Odd Down were relegated to the First Division:

- Sherborne Town, runners up in the First Division.
- Wellington, champions of the First Division.

=== Final table ===
Pos	Team	Pld	W	D	L	GF	GA	GD	Pts	Promotion or relegation
1	Bitton (C)	40	26	6	8	85	32	+53	84	
2	Frome Town (P)	40	23	7	10	74	44	+30	76	Promotion to Southern League Division One S&W (Note: Bitton did not apply for promotion as their ground would not have reached the required standard for the Southern League. Frome applied for promotion instead, and were accepted.)
3	Willand Rovers	40	20	13	7	72	49	+23	73	
4	Dawlish Town	40	23	3	14	93	52	+41	72	
5	Bristol Manor Farm	40	22	6	12	75	53	+22	72	
6	Bideford	40	20	9	11	68	43	+25	69	
7	Wellington	40	20	7	13	87	53	+34	67	
8	Welton Rovers	40	19	9	12	64	52	+12	66	
9	Hallen	40	19	8	13	57	40	+17	65	
10	Brislington	40	18	6	16	62	54	+8	60	
11	Melksham Town	40	15	14	11	59	53	+6	59	
12	Sherborne Town	40	17	8	15	55	59	−4	59	
13	Street	40	13	7	20	55	65	−10	46	
14	Ilfracombe Town	40	11	11	18	48	70	−22	44	
15	Bishop Sutton	40	9	16	15	48	48	0	43	
16	Calne Town	40	11	10	19	70	78	−8	43	
17	Radstock Town	40	12	6	22	56	95	−39	42	
18	Barnstaple Town	40	10	9	21	49	82	−33	39	
19	Corsham Town	40	10	8	22	37	80	−43	38	
20	Chard Town (R)	40	9	5	26	30	77	−47	32	Relegation to the First Division
21	Devizes Town (R)	40	5	8	27	41	106	−65	23	Relegation to the First Division

Updated to match(es) played on 5 May 2009. Source:
Rules for classification: 1) points; 2) goal difference; 3) number of goals scored.
(C) Champions; (P) Promoted; (R) Relegated

== First Division ==
The First Division featured three new clubs in a league of 20, reduced from 21 the previous season after Wellington and Sherborne Town were promoted to the Premier Division, Backwell United resigned and Weston St Johns were relegated. Both the latter two clubs joined the Somerset County League.

- Odd Down, relegated from the Premier Division.
- Gillingham Town, promoted as runners-up in the Dorset Premier Football League.
- Wells City, promoted as runners-up in the Somerset County League.
- Portishead F.C. changed their name to Portishead Town F.C.

=== Final table ===
Pos	Team	Pld	W	D	L	GF	GA	GD	Pts	Promotion
1	Larkhall Athletic (C, P)	38	30	5	3	127	27	+100	95	Promotion to the Premier Division
2	Longwell Green Sports (P)	38	27	4	7	78	40	+38	85	Promotion to the Premier Division
3	Bradford Town	38	22	6	10	106	55	+51	72	
4	Cadbury Heath	38	21	8	9	84	54	+30	68 (Note: Cadbury Heath had three points deducted)	
5	Keynsham Town	38	19	9	10	62	46	+16	66	
6	Hengrove Athletic	38	19	4	15	57	52	+5	61	
7	Oldland Abbotonians	38	17	8	13	65	60	+5	59	
8	Shrewton United	38	18	4	16	73	66	+7	57 (Note: Shrewton United and Westbury United each had one point deducted.)	
9	Westbury United	38	16	8	14	71	50	+21	55	
10	Wells City	38	14	10	14	54	70	−16	52	
11	Portishead Town	38	14	9	15	56	59	−3	51	
12	Gillingham Town	38	14	8	16	71	72	−1	50	
13	Bridport	38	14	7	17	51	65	−14	49	
14	Elmore	38	12	7	19	72	104	−32	43	
15	Clevedon United	38	11	7	20	60	78	−18	40	
16	Roman Glass St George	38	8	15	15	58	77	−19	39	
17	Shepton Mallet	38	10	6	22	51	88	−37	36	
18	Almondsbury	38	8	11	19	70	91	−21	35	
19	Odd Down	38	7	9	22	51	80	−29	30	
20	Minehead Town	38	5	3	30	33	116	−83	18	

Updated to match(es) played on 5 May 2009. Source:
Rules for classification: 1) points; 2) goal difference; 3) number of goals scored.
(C) Champions; (P) Promoted
