= 2007–08 Southern Football League =

The 2007–08 season was the 105th in the history of the Southern League, which is an English football competition featuring semi-professional and amateur clubs from the South West, South Central and Midlands of England and South Wales.

== Premier Division ==
The Premier Division consisted of 22 clubs, including 17 clubs from the previous season and five new clubs:

- Two clubs promoted from Division One Midlands:
  - Brackley Town
  - Bromsgrove Rovers
- Two clubs promoted from Division One South & West:
  - Bashley
  - Swindon Supermarine
- Plus:
  - Bedford Town, relegated from the Conference South

King's Lynn won the Southern League Premier and were promoted to the Conference North, while play-off winners Team Bath were promoted to the Conference South. Bromsgrove Rovers, Cirencester Town and Cheshunt were relegated to Division One. Bedford Town also ended the season in the relegation zone but were reprieved from the second relegation in a row after Football Conference clubs Halifax Town folded and Nuneaton Borough were demoted to Division One Midlands.

=== League table ===
Southern Football League Premier Division
- Season: 2007–08
- Champions: King's Lynn
- Promoted: King's Lynn; Team Bath
- Relegated: Bromsgrove Rovers; Cirencester Town; Cheshunt
- Matches: 462
- Goals: 1,301 (2.82 per match)
- Top goalscorer: Sean Canham (Team Bath) - 31
- Biggest home win: Brackley Town 6 – 0 Cheshunt, 5 January 2008; Yate Town 7 – 1 Cheshunt, 26 February 2008
- Biggest away win: Rugby Town 0 – 5 Gloucester City, 26 February 2008
- Highest scoring: Merthyr Tydfil 5 – 4 Corby Town, 5 April 2008
- Highest attendance: 2336 (King's Lynn 0 – 0 Team Bath, 5 April 2008)
- Lowest attendance: 72 (Team Bath 3 – 1 Cirencester Town, 11 March 2008)
- Average attendance: 325

Pos	Team	Pld	W	D	L	GF	GA	GD	Pts	Promotion or relegation
1	King's Lynn	42	24	13	5	91	36	+55	85	Promoted to the Conference North
2	Team Bath	42	25	8	9	71	41	+30	83	Qualified for the play-offs, then promoted to the Conference South
3	Halesowen Town	42	22	13	7	80	46	+34	79	Qualified for the play-offs
4	Chippenham Town	42	20	13	9	73	44	+29	73	Qualified for the play-offs
5	Bashley	42	19	12	11	60	46	+14	69	Qualified for the play-offs
6	Gloucester City	42	19	11	12	81	50	+31	68	
7	Hemel Hempstead Town	42	19	11	12	67	50	+17	68	
8	Brackley Town	42	16	12	14	57	53	+4	60	
9	Banbury United	42	14	16	12	55	57	−2	58	
10	Yate Town	42	16	10	16	71	76	−5	58	
11	Clevedon Town	42	13	18	11	49	46	+3	57	
12	Swindon Supermarine	42	14	12	16	51	67	−16	54	
13	Merthyr Tydfil	42	13	14	15	65	70	−5	53	
14	Mangotsfield United	42	12	16	14	38	42	−4	52	
15	Rugby Town	42	13	12	17	55	66	−11	51	
16	Corby Town	42	14	8	20	60	67	−7	50	
17	Tiverton Town	42	13	11	18	45	60	−15	50	
18	Hitchin Town	42	12	11	19	46	61	−15	47	
19	Bedford Town	42	12	9	21	54	73	−19	45	Reprieved from relegation
20	Bromsgrove Rovers	42	10	12	20	46	67	−21	42	Relegated to Division One Midlands
21	Cirencester Town	42	8	8	26	44	80	−36	32	Relegated to Division One South & West
22	Cheshunt	42	5	8	29	42	103	−61	23	Relegated to IL Division One North

Source: fchd.com
Rules for classification: 1) points; 2) goal difference; 3) number of goals scored.

=== Play-offs ===
Semifinals
2	Team Bath	4
5	Bashley	1
3	Halesowen Town	2
4	Chippenham Town	1

Final
2	Team Bath	2
3	Halesowen Town	1

=== Results ===
Home \ Away	BAN	BAS	BED	BRK	BRO	CHE	CHI	CIR	CLE	COR	GLO	HAL	HEM	HIT	KLY	MAN	MER	RUG	SWI	TBA	TIV	YAT
Banbury United		0–2	1–2	1–0	2–1	2–1	1–3	1–0	0–0	2–1	1–1	0–0	1–1	1–1	0–2	1–1	1–1	2–3	2–1	0–0	2–1	2–4
Bashley	2–1		1–1	0–0	4–0	2–1	2–0	3–1	0–0	0–0	0–0	2–1	2–3	2–3	1–1	1–0	3–0	1–1	1–0	4–3	2–1	3–1
Bedford Town	0–0	2–1		3–4	0–4	5–3	0–1	2–0	1–1	1–2	2–0	0–3	1–1	3–2	0–3	0–1	3–3	1–1	4–0	1–2	1–0	2–2
Brackley Town	2–1	1–0	2–1		3–0	6–0	2–4	2–1	1–1	2–2	1–3	1–2	0–3	3–1	1–1	1–2	1–0	1–1	2–0	0–1	0–2	2–2
Bromsgrove Rovers	0–2	0–0	0–2	1–1		3–3	0–0	1–1	1–0	0–2	1–4	1–0	0–3	3–1	1–1	3–1	1–1	4–0	0–0	2–3	1–1	1–2
Cheshunt	1–1	1–3	1–2	2–2	1–0		1–4	2–0	1–2	1–5	0–3	0–2	0–4	1–2	1–3	0–0	0–0	1–2	3–0	1–2	0–0	0–3
Chippenham Town	2–2	2–2	5–0	1–2	2–2	5–1		2–0	1–0	1–1	4–1	0–0	1–2	1–0	2–2	1–0	3–1	1–1	3–1	1–1	5–1	3–2
Cirencester Town	0–1	0–3	2–1	1–0	2–1	4–3	1–2		1–2	0–0	1–4	2–3	1–0	2–3	0–4	0–0	1–1	1–2	1–2	0–1	3–2	1–2
Clevedon Town	0–1	0–0	2–1	0–0	0–2	2–1	0–0	2–2		3–0	1–1	0–1	1–0	1–1	2–2	2–1	3–3	3–2	1–2	0–2	4–0	1–1
Corby Town	2–1	4–2	1–0	2–0	4–2	2–0	0–0	2–4	1–1		2–5	1–2	0–2	3–0	0–2	1–2	0–1	3–4	0–2	1–2	1–0	2–2
Gloucester City	0–0	0–2	1–2	1–3	5–0	4–0	3–0	0–0	2–1	2–1		1–1	0–0	2–0	1–1	0–1	3–1	2–3	5–0	2–1	4–1	2–3
Halesowen Town	1–2	4–1	0–2	2–0	2–1	1–1	1–1	3–2	1–1	1–2	2–1		0–2	2–1	4–1	2–0	3–0	4–1	4–4	3–1	5–1	1–0
Hemel Hempstead Town	2–3	1–1	2–0	1–1	0–2	4–1	0–2	2–1	0–1	3–2	1–1	3–3		1–1	4–2	2–0	0–0	3–1	0–1	1–3	2–1	1–2
Hitchin Town	3–3	2–0	2–2	0–1	0–1	3–1	1–0	1–1	3–0	0–2	1–2	1–2	1–2		2–2	1–0	1–3	0–0	0–1	2–1	2–0	2–1
King's Lynn	3–1	5–0	2–1	2–1	1–0	4–0	2–0	6–2	2–0	0–1	2–1	1–1	2–2	0–0		1–1	5–1	2–0	6–1	0–0	1–1	5–0
Mangotsfield United	2–2	2–0	1–0	1–0	1–1	2–0	4–2	1–0	2–2	2–0	0–2	2–2	1–2	0–0	1–0		0–2	0–0	2–2	0–2	1–1	0–0
Merthyr Tydfil	1–1	0–2	3–2	4–1	2–0	1–2	2–0	3–0	1–2	5–4	1–3	2–2	0–0	3–0	0–2	1–1		2–1	3–1	1–1	2–0	3–5
Rugby Town	2–2	1–1	5–1	1–2	2–1	1–1	0–1	0–1	1–2	2–0	0–5	2–1	1–2	0–2	1–0	1–0	3–3		1–2	0–2	2–2	4–0
Swindon Supermarine	4–3	0–2	1–1	1–1	4–0	2–1	0–2	1–1	1–1	2–0	4–1	1–1	1–0	0–0	0–3	0–0	0–0	0–1		0–1	1–2	5–1
Team Bath	3–1	1–0	2–0	0–1	1–2	2–0	1–1	3–0	1–1	2–1	4–2	0–3	3–2	4–0	0–4	2–1	3–1	0–0	5–0		0–1	1–1
Tiverton Town	0–2	1–0	3–0	1–1	1–0	1–3	1–0	2–1	1–0	2–2	0–0	1–1	5–1	1–0	0–1	1–1	3–2	1–0	0–1	0–2		1–1
Yate Town	1–2	1–2	2–1	0–2	2–2	7–1	0–4	4–2	1–3	2–0	1–1	0–3	0–2	3–0	1–2	1–0	3–1	3–1	2–2	0–2	2–1	

Updated to match(es) played on unknown. Source: Statto.com
Legend: Blue = home team win; Yellow = draw; Red = away team win.

=== Stadia and locations ===
Locations of the Premier Division clubs

Club	Stadium	Capacity
Banbury United	Spencer Stadium	2,000
Bashley	Bashley Road	2,000
Bedford Town	The Eyrie	3,000
Brackley Town	St. James Park	3,500
Bromsgrove Rovers	Victoria Ground	4,893
Cheshunt	Cheshunt Stadium	3,500
Chippenham Town	Hardenhuish Park	2,815
Cirencester Town	Corinium Stadium	4,500
Clevedon Town	Hand Stadium	3,500
Corby Town	Steel Park	3,893
Gloucester City	The New Lawn (groundshare with Forest Green Rovers)	5,032
Halesowen Town	The Grove	5,000
Hemel Hempstead Town	Vauxhall Road	3,152
Hitchin Town	Top Field	4,000
King's Lynn	The Walks	5,733
Mangotsfield United	Cossham Street	2,500
Merthyr Tydfil	Penydarren Park	4,500
Rugby Town	Butlin Road	6,000
Swindon Supermarine	Hunts Copse Ground	3,000
Team Bath	Twerton Park (groundshare with Bath City)	4,500
Tiverton Town	Ladysmead	3,500
Yate Town	Lodge Road	2,000

== Division One Midlands ==
Division One Midlands consisted of 21 clubs, including 18 clubs from previous season and three new clubs:

- Two clubs promoted from the Midland Alliance:
  - Leamington
  - Romulus
- Plus:
  - Chesham United, transferred from Division One South & West
  - Slimbridge, promoted from the Hellenic League

Also, shortly before the start of the season Slimbridge withdrew and were not replaced. Therefore, the relegation zone was reduced to one place in order to make up the numbers for the next season.

Evesham United won the division and were promoted to the Premier Division along with play-off winners Stourbridge, who returned to the top Southern League division after the relegation in 1984. Berkhamsted finished bottom of the table and were the only club relegated this season.

=== League table ===
Southern Football League Division One Midlands
- Season: 2007–08
- Champions: Evesham United
- Promoted: Evesham United; Stourbridge
- Relegated: Berkhamsted Town
- Matches: 420
- Goals: 1,217 (2.9 per match)
- Top goalscorer: Mark Bellingham (Leamington) - 45
- Biggest home win: Chesham United 11 – 0 Malvern Town, 24 November 2007
- Biggest away win: Rothwell Town 0 – 6 Rushall Olympic, 8 January 2008
- Highest scoring: Chesham United 11 – 0 Malvern Town, 24 November 2007
- Highest attendance: 860 (Leamington 2 – 4 Chasetown, 8 March 2008)
- Lowest attendance: 38 (Stourport Swifts 0 – 1 Rothwell Town, 4 December 2007)
- Average attendance: 166

Pos	Team	Pld	W	D	L	GF	GA	GD	Pts	Promotion or relegation
1	Evesham United	40	28	7	5	68	24	+44	91	Promoted to the Premier Division
2	Leamington	40	27	8	5	74	27	+47	89	Qualified for the play-offs
3	Stourbridge	40	25	3	12	97	48	+49	78	Qualified for the play-offs, then promoted to the Premier Division
4	Sutton Coldfield Town	40	23	8	9	93	52	+41	77	Qualified for the play-offs
5	Rushall Olympic	40	23	7	10	68	23	+45	76	Qualified for play-offs, then transferred to NPL Division One South
6	Chesham United	40	23	7	10	78	40	+38	76	
7	Chasetown	40	23	6	11	71	38	+33	75	
8	Aylesbury United	40	19	9	12	64	49	+15	66	
9	Leighton Town	40	17	12	11	59	42	+17	63	
10	Romulus	40	18	8	14	60	53	+7	62	
11	Barton Rovers	40	14	16	10	54	45	+9	58	
12	Bishop's Cleeve	40	17	7	16	63	61	+2	58	Transferred to Division One South & West
13	Dunstable Town	40	14	5	21	63	65	−2	47	
14	Willenhall Town	40	12	13	15	53	58	−5	46 (Note: Willenhall Town deducted 3 points for fielding an ineligible player)	Transferred to NPL Division One South
15	Bedworth United	40	12	10	18	40	51	−11	46	
16	Cinderford Town	40	12	6	22	47	82	−35	42	Transferred to Division One South & West
17	Stourport Swifts	40	10	8	22	40	81	−41	38	
18	Rothwell Town	40	9	5	26	34	69	−35	32	
19	Woodford United	40	7	6	27	30	88	−58	27	
20	Malvern Town	40	3	9	28	34	95	−61	18	
21	Berkhamsted Town	40	2	4	34	27	126	−99	10	Relegated to the Spartan South Midlands League
22	Slimbridge	0	0	0	0	0	0	0	0	Before the start of the season Slimbridge withdrew and were not replaced

Source: fchd.com
Rules for classification: 1) points; 2) goal difference; 3) number of goals scored.

=== Play-offs ===
Semifinals
2	Leamington	1
5	Rushall Olympic	0
3	Stourbridge	1
4	Sutton Coldfield Town	0

Final
2	Leamington	1
3	Stourbridge	2

=== Stadia and locations ===
Locations of Division One Midlands clubs

Club	Stadium	Capacity
Aylesbury United	The Meadow (groundshare with Chesham United)	5,000
Barton Rovers	Sharpenhoe Road	4,000
Bedworth United	The Oval	3,000
Berkhamsted	Broadwater	2,500
Bishops Cleeve	Kayte Lane	1,500
Chasetown	The Scholars Ground	2,000
Chesham United	The Meadow	5,000
Cinderford Town	Causeway Ground	3,500
Dunstable Town	Creasey Park	3,200
Evesham United	St George's Lane (groundshare with Worcester City)	3,000
Leamington	New Windmill Ground	3,000
Leighton Town	Bell Close	2,800
Malvern Town	Langland Stadium	2,500
Romulus	The Central Ground (groundshare with Sutton Coldfield Town)	2,000
Rothwell Town	Cecil Street	3,500
Rushall Olympic	Dales Lane	1,400
Stourbridge	War Memorial Athletic Ground	2,626
Stourport Swifts	Walshes Meadow	2,000
Sutton Coldfield Town	The Central Ground	2,000
Willenhall Town	Noose Lane	2,500
Woodford United	Byfield Road	3,000

== Division One South & West ==
Division One South & West consisted of 22 clubs, including 16 clubs from previous season and six new clubs:

- Bridgwater Town, promoted from the Western League
- Farnborough, a newly formed phoenix club
- Fleet Town, transferred from Isthmian League Division One South
- Godalming Town, transferred from Isthmian League Division One South
- Gosport Borough, promoted from the Wessex League
- Slough Town, relegated from Isthmian League Premier Division

Also, Brook House were renamed A.F.C. Hayes prior to the start of the season.

Farnborough, who replaced Farnborough Town that folded at the end of the previous season, won the division and were promoted to the Premier Division along with play-off winners Oxford City. Slough Town finished in the relegation zone for the second season in a row, but this time were reprieved due to the expulsion of Halifax Town from the Football Conference, so only Newport (Isle of Wight) were relegated this season.

=== League table ===
Southern Football League Division One South & West
- Season: 2007–08
- Champions: Farnborough
- Promoted: Farnborough; Oxford City
- Relegated: Newport (Isle of Wight)
- Matches: 462
- Goals: 1,523 (3.3 per match)
- Top goalscorer: Justin Bennett (Gosport Borough) - 28
- Biggest home win: Thatcham Town 8 – 0 Newport IOW, 10 November 2007
- Biggest away win: Newport IOW 0 – 7 Farnborough, 1 December 2007
- Highest scoring: Newport IOW 3 – 6 Abingdon United, 2 October 2007 Slough Town 3 – 6 Didcot Town, 3 November 2007; Andover 6 – 3 Taunton Town, 3 November 2007; AFC Hayes 2 – 7 Farnborough, 22 December 2007 Godalming Town 8 – 1 Newport IOW, 22 March 2008
- Highest attendance: 951 (Farnborough 5 – 1 Fleet Town, 26 December 2007)
- Lowest attendance: 42 (AFC Hayes 1 – 2 Newport IOW, 24 November 2007)
- Average attendance: 186

Pos	Team	Pld	W	D	L	GF	GA	GD	Pts	Promotion or relegation
1	Farnborough	42	27	8	7	120	48	+72	89	Promoted to the Premier Division
2	Fleet Town	42	26	7	9	78	48	+30	85	Qualified for play-offs, then transferred to IL Division One South
3	Didcot Town	42	24	11	7	99	42	+57	83	Qualified for play-offs
4	Oxford City	42	24	9	9	82	41	+41	81	Qualified for play-offs, then promoted to the Premier Division
5	Uxbridge	42	22	9	11	72	50	+22	75	Qualified for play-offs
6	Bridgwater Town	42	19	13	10	74	45	+29	70	
7	Paulton Rovers	42	20	10	12	77	57	+20	70	
8	Windsor & Eton	42	20	9	13	75	66	+9	69	
9	Marlow	42	20	6	16	74	54	+20	66	Transferred to Division One Midlands
10	Burnham	42	18	9	15	67	55	+12	63	
11	Gosport Borough	42	18	8	16	69	67	+2	62	
12	Godalming Town	42	17	9	16	70	70	0	60	Transferred to IL Division One South
13	Hillingdon Borough	42	16	8	18	68	70	−2	56	Transferred to IL Division One North
14	AFC Hayes	42	17	4	21	75	99	−24	55	
15	Thatcham Town	42	13	10	19	59	62	−3	49	
16	Abingdon United	42	13	9	20	64	75	−11	48	
17	Winchester City	42	13	9	20	58	71	−13	48	
18	Taunton Town	42	12	11	19	66	79	−13	47	
19	Andover	42	11	7	24	62	101	−39	40	
20	Bracknell Town	42	8	10	24	45	93	−48	34	
21	Slough Town	42	9	5	28	44	87	−43	32	Reprieved from relegation
22	Newport (Isle of Wight)	42	2	5	35	25	143	−118	11	Relegated to Wessex League

Source: fchd.com
Rules for classification: 1) points; 2) goal difference; 3) number of goals scored.

=== Play-offs ===
Semifinals
2	Fleet Town	1
5	Uxbridge	2
3	Didcot Town	2(4)
4	Oxford City	2(5)

Final
5	Uxbridge	0
4	Oxford City	1

=== Stadia and locations ===
Locations of Division One South & West clubs
Greater London Division One South & West clubs

Club	Stadium	Capacity
A.F.C. Hayes	Farm Park	1,500
Abingdon United	Northcourt Road	2,000
Andover	Portway Stadium	3,000
Bracknell Town	Larges Lane	2,500
Bridgwater Town	Fairfax Park	2,500
Burnham	The Gore	2,500
Didcot Town	Draycott Engineering Loop Meadow Stadium	3,000
Farnborough	Cherrywood Road	7,000
Fleet Town	Calthorpe Park	2,000
Godalming Town	Weycourt	3,000
Gosport Borough	Privett Park	4,500
Hillingdon Borough	Middlesex Stadium	3,587
Marlow	Alfred Davis Memorial Ground	3,000
Newport (Isle of Wight)	St Georges Park	3,200
Oxford City	Court Place Farm	2,000
Paulton Rovers	Athletic Field	2,500
Slough Town	Holloways Park (groundshare with Beaconsfield SYCOB)	3,500
Taunton Town	Wordsworth Drive	2,500
Thatcham Town	Waterside Park	1,500
Uxbridge	Honeycroft	3,770
Winchester City	The City Ground	4,500
Windsor & Eton	Stag Meadow	4,500

== League Cup ==
2007–08 Southern League Cup
Tournament details
- Country: England
- Teams: 66

Final positions
- Champions: Hillingdon Borough
- Runners-up: Clevedon Town

=== First round ===
42 clubs, (all of the Division One Midlands and all but one of the Division One South & West clubs), entered at the first round. Bridgwater Town did not enter at this stage because there were only 21 clubs in Division One Midlands.

Tie	Home team (tier)	Score	Away team (tier)	Att.
1	Aylesbury United (M)	2–1	Chesham United (M)	
2	Paulton Rovers (SW)	2–2	Gosport Borough (SW)	
Gosport Borough won 7–6 on penalties
3	A.F.C. Hayes (SW)	6–1	Slough Town (SW)	
4	Barton Rovers (M)	0–1	Uxbridge (SW)	
5	Berkhamsted Town (M)	4–2	Woodford United (M)	
6	Chasetown (M)	1–2	Bedworth United (M)	
7	Didcot Town (SW)	4–2	Andover (SW)	
8	Dunstable Town (M)	1–0	Leighton Town (M)	
9	Farnborough (SW)	2–2	Abingdon United (SW)	
Farnborough won 3–2 on penalties
10	Godalming Town (SW)	3–2	Thatcham Town (SW)	
11	Hillingdon Borough (SW)	3–0	Bracknell Town (SW)	

Tie	Home team (tier)	Score	Away team (tier)	Att.
12	Marlow (SW)	4–3	Burnham (SW)	
13	Oxford City (SW)	4–2	Fleet Town (SW)	
14	Romulus (M)	2–1	Rushall Olympic (M)	
15	Stourbridge (M)	0–1	Malvern Town (M)	
16	Stourport Swifts (M)	1–2	Evesham United (M)	
17	Willenhall Town (M)	0–3	Winchester City (M)	
18	Windsor & Eton (SW)	1–0	Winchester City (SW)	
19	Bishops Cleeve (M)	1–2	Cinderford Town (M)	
20	Rothwell Town (M)	1–3	Leamington (M)	
21	Taunton Town (SW)	2–1	Newport (Isle of Wight) (SW)	

=== Second round ===
The 12 fixtures of the Second Round were played on the weekend of 30 October 2007. Joining the winners of the previous round were Bridgwater Town, plus Chippenham Town and Gloucester City from the Premier Division.

Tie	Home team (tier)	Score	Away team (tier)	Att.
22	Berkhamsted Town (M)	1–1	Aylesbury United (M)	
Berkhamsted Town won 5–4 on penalties
23	Bridgwater Town (SW)	2–3	Chippenham Town (P)	
24	Evesham United (M)	2–4	Gloucester City (P)	
25	Godalming Town (SW)	1–1	Farnborough (SW)	
Godalming Town won 3–1 on penalties
26	Hillingdon Borough (SW)	2–0	Windsor & Eton (SW)	
27	Leamington (M)	1–0	Bedworth United (M)	

Tie	Home team (tier)	Score	Away team (tier)	Att.
28	Marlow (SW)	3–2	A.F.C. Hayes (SW)	
29	Oxford City (SW)	3–4	Didcot Town (SW)	
30	Romulus (M)	0–2	Sutton Coldfield Town (M)	
31	Uxbridge (SW)	1–0	Dunstable Town (M)	
32	Cinderford Town (M)	2–0	Malvern Town (M)	
33	Taunton Town (SW)	0–2	Gosport Borough (SW)	

=== Third round ===
Tie	Home team (tier)	Score	Away team (tier)	Att.
34	Banbury United (P)	2–0	Brackley Town (P)	
35	Bedford Town (P)	3–1	Corby Town (P)	
36	Clevedon Town (P)	2–1	Tiverton Town (P)	
37	Gosport Borough (SW)	0–2	Didcot Town (SW)	
38	Hillingdon Borough (SW)	3–0	Berkhamsted Town (M)	
39	King's Lynn (P)	3–1	Hitchin Town (P)	
40	Mangotsfield United (P)	4–1	Yate Town (P)	
41	Marlow (SW)	1–3	Cheshunt (P)	
42	Rugby Town (P)	2–0	Halesowen Town (P)	

Tie	Home team (tier)	Score	Away team (tier)	Att.
43	Swindon Supermarine (P)	5–1	Merthyr Tydfil (P)	
44	Team Bath (P)	2–1	Chippenham Town (P)	
45	Uxbridge (SW)	2–2	Hemel Hempstead Town (P)	
Hemel Hempstead won 4–3 on penalties
46	Cirencester Town (P)	2–1	Cinderford Town (M)	
47	Sutton Coldfield Town (M)	3–1	Gloucester City (P)	
48	Bromsgrove Rovers (P)	2–2	Leamington (M)	
Bromsgrove Rovers won 4–2 on penalties
49	Bashley (P)	1–0	Godalming Town (SW)	

=== Fourth round ===
Tie	Home team (tier)	Score	Away team (tier)	Att.
50	Cirencester Town (P)	3–2	Sutton Coldfield Town (P)	
51	Bashley (P)	3–3	Hillingdon Borough (SW)	
Hillingdon Borough won 4–3 on penalties
52	Bromsgrove Rovers (P)	2–4	Banbury United (P)	
53	Didcot Town (SW)	4–0	Cheshunt (P)	

Tie	Home team (tier)	Score	Away team (tier)	Att.
54	Mangotsfield United (P)	0–2	Swindon Supermarine (P)	
55	Rugby Town (P)	1–0	Bedford Town (P)	
56	Team Bath (P)	0–1	Clevedon Town (P)	
57	King's Lynn (P)	1–1	Hemel Hempstead Town (P)	
King's Lynn won 5–3 on penalties

=== Quarter-finals ===
The quarter-finals were played on 12 February 2008.

Tie	Home team (tier)	Score	Away team (tier)	Att.
58	Banbury United (P)	0–1	Hillingdon Borough (SW)	
59	Didcot Town (SW)	2–2	Cirencester Town (P)	
Didcot Town won 4–3 on penalties

Tie	Home team (tier)	Score	Away team (tier)	Att.
60	King's Lynn (P)	4–1	Rugby Town (P)	
61	Swindon Supermarine (P)	0–6	Clevedon Town (P)	

=== Semi-finals ===
The semi-finals were played on 4 March 2008.

Tie	Home team (tier)	Score	Away team (tier)	Att.
62	Didcot Town (SW)	1–2	Clevedon Town (P)	
After Extra Time
63	King's Lynn (P)	0–1	Hillingdon Borough (SW)	

=== Final ===
The first leg was played on 8 April 2008, with the second leg on 22 April 2008.

Tie	Home team (tier)	Score	Away team (tier)	Att.
First Leg
64	Hillingdon Borough (SW)	1–1	Clevedon Town (P)	
Second Leg
65	Clevedon Town (P)	0–3	Hillingdon Borough (SW)	

== See also ==
- Southern Football League
- 2007–08 Isthmian League
- 2007–08 Northern Premier League
