= 2006–07 Western Football League =

Western Football League
- Season: 2006–07

The 2006–07 Western Football League season (known as the 2006–07 Toolstation Western Football League for sponsorship reasons) was the 105th in the history of the Western Football League, a football competition in England. Teams were divided into two divisions; the Premier and the First.

The league champions for the first time in their history were Corsham Town, although it was runners-up Bridgwater Town who took promotion to the Southern League. The champions of Division One were newcomers Truro City.

== Premier Division ==
The Premier Division featured three new clubs in a league of 22, increased from 21 the previous season after Exmouth Town resigned and Backwell United were relegated to the First Division.

- Chard Town, runners-up in the First Division.
- Dawlish Town, champions of the First Division.
- Street, third-placed in the First Division.

=== Final table ===
| Pos | Team | Pld | W | D | L | GF | GA | GD | Pts | Promotion or relegation |
|---|---|---|---|---|---|---|---|---|---|---|
| 1 | Corsham Town (C) | 42 | 29 | 9 | 4 | 81 | 30 | +51 | 96 | |
| 2 | Bridgwater Town (P) | 42 | 29 | 7 | 6 | 91 | 34 | +57 | 94 | Promotion to Southern League Division One S&W |
| 3 | Frome Town | 42 | 28 | 7 | 7 | 86 | 41 | +45 | 91 | |
| 4 | Bideford | 42 | 23 | 8 | 11 | 88 | 48 | +40 | 77 | |
| 5 | Melksham Town | 42 | 21 | 10 | 11 | 84 | 48 | +36 | 73 | |
| 6 | Willand Rovers | 42 | 21 | 10 | 11 | 69 | 46 | +23 | 73 | |
| 7 | Barnstaple Town | 42 | 21 | 9 | 12 | 72 | 71 | +1 | 72 | |
| 8 | Bitton | 42 | 19 | 10 | 13 | 66 | 49 | +17 | 67 | |
| 9 | Hallen | 42 | 20 | 7 | 15 | 72 | 60 | +12 | 67 | |
| 10 | Dawlish Town | 42 | 17 | 8 | 17 | 73 | 66 | +7 | 59 | |
| 11 | Odd Down | 42 | 17 | 7 | 18 | 50 | 53 | −3 | 58 | |
| 12 | Bristol Manor Farm | 42 | 14 | 12 | 16 | 50 | 51 | −1 | 54 | |
| 13 | Calne Town | 42 | 15 | 7 | 20 | 57 | 58 | −1 | 52 | |
| 14 | Devizes Town | 42 | 14 | 10 | 18 | 58 | 70 | −12 | 52 | |
| 15 | Welton Rovers | 42 | 12 | 15 | 15 | 54 | 47 | +7 | 51 | |
| 16 | Radstock Town | 42 | 14 | 5 | 23 | 58 | 78 | −20 | 47 | |
| 17 | Brislington | 42 | 11 | 13 | 18 | 44 | 61 | −17 | 46 | |
| 18 | Chard Town | 42 | 9 | 11 | 22 | 51 | 78 | −27 | 38 | |
| 19 | Street | 42 | 9 | 11 | 22 | 50 | 83 | −33 | 38 | |
| 20 | Torrington | 42 | 9 | 6 | 27 | 46 | 105 | −59 | 33 | Resigned at the end of the season |
| 21 | Bishop Sutton | 42 | 9 | 4 | 29 | 38 | 89 | −51 | 31 | |
| 22 | Keynsham Town (R) | 42 | 4 | 8 | 30 | 35 | 107 | −72 | 20 | Relegation to the First Division |

Updated to match(es) played on 14 May 2007. Source:
Rules for classification: 1) points; 2) goal difference; 3) number of goals scored.
(C) Champions; (P) Promoted; (R) Relegated

== First Division ==
The First Division remained at 22 clubs after Chard Town, Dawlish Town and Street were promoted to the Premier Division, and Saltash United left to join the South Western League. Four clubs joined:

- Backwell United, relegated from the Premier Division.
- Hengrove Athletic, promoted as champions of the Somerset County League.
- Sherborne Town, promoted as runners-up in the Dorset Premier League.
- Truro City, transferred as runners-up in the South Western League.

=== Final table ===
| Pos | Team | Pld | W | D | L | GF | GA | GD | Pts | Promotion or relegation |
|---|---|---|---|---|---|---|---|---|---|---|
| 1 | Truro City (C, P) | 42 | 37 | 4 | 1 | 185 | 23 | +162 | 115 | Promotion to the Premier Division |
| 2 | Portishead | 42 | 29 | 6 | 7 | 88 | 33 | +55 | 93 | |
| 3 | Ilfracombe Town (P) | 42 | 29 | 5 | 8 | 98 | 51 | +47 | 92 | Promotion to the Premier Division |
| 4 | Sherborne Town | 42 | 25 | 8 | 9 | 87 | 44 | +43 | 83 | |
| 5 | Larkhall Athletic | 42 | 24 | 8 | 10 | 88 | 41 | +47 | 80 | |
| 6 | Westbury United | 42 | 19 | 10 | 13 | 71 | 57 | +14 | 67 | |
| 7 | Wellington | 42 | 18 | 9 | 15 | 63 | 60 | +3 | 63 | |
| 8 | Longwell Green Sports | 42 | 17 | 11 | 14 | 51 | 44 | +7 | 62 | |
| 9 | Cadbury Heath | 42 | 17 | 9 | 16 | 78 | 69 | +9 | 60 | |
| 10 | Hengrove Athletic | 42 | 17 | 7 | 18 | 58 | 64 | −6 | 58 | |
| 11 | Bridport | 42 | 17 | 6 | 19 | 84 | 81 | +3 | 57 | |
| 12 | Shrewton United | 42 | 15 | 11 | 16 | 65 | 71 | −6 | 56 | |
| 13 | Biddestone | 42 | 15 | 9 | 18 | 69 | 73 | −4 | 54 | Resigned at the end of the season |
| 14 | Clevedon United | 42 | 14 | 12 | 16 | 54 | 69 | −15 | 54 | |
| 15 | Almondsbury | 42 | 11 | 11 | 20 | 47 | 73 | −26 | 44 | |
| 16 | Elmore | 42 | 10 | 14 | 18 | 62 | 94 | −32 | 44 | |
| 17 | Bradford Town | 42 | 12 | 4 | 26 | 42 | 86 | −44 | 40 | |
| 18 | Backwell United | 42 | 10 | 8 | 24 | 48 | 105 | −57 | 38 | |
| 19 | Weston St Johns | 42 | 8 | 10 | 24 | 47 | 93 | −46 | 34 | |
| 20 | Shepton Mallet | 42 | 8 | 10 | 24 | 34 | 83 | −49 | 34 | |
| 21 | Clyst Rovers | 42 | 8 | 9 | 25 | 61 | 108 | −47 | 33 | Transferred to the South West Peninsula League |
| 22 | Minehead Town | 42 | 7 | 9 | 26 | 42 | 100 | −58 | 30 | |

Updated to match(es) played on 19 May 2007. Source:
Rules for classification: 1) points; 2) goal difference; 3) number of goals scored.
(C) Champions; (P) Promoted
