= 2007–08 Western Football League =

Western Football League
- Season: 2007–08

The 2007–08 Western Football League season (known as the 2007–08 Toolstation Western Football League for sponsorship reasons) was the 106th in the history of the Western Football League, a football competition in England. Teams were divided into two divisions; the Premier and the First.

The league champions for the first time in their history were Truro City, who were promoted to the Southern League. The champions of Division One were Wellington.

== Premier Division ==
The Premier Division featured two new clubs in a league of 21, reduced from 22 the previous season after the promotion of Bridgwater Town to the Southern League, the relegation of Keynsham Town to the First Division, and the resignation of Torrington, who joined the North Devon League.

- Ilfracombe Town, third in the First Division.
- Truro City, champions of the First Division.

=== Final table ===
Pos	Team	Pld	W	D	L	GF	GA	GD	Pts	Promotion or relegation
1	Truro City (C, P)	40	33	4	3	132	39	+93	103	Promotion to Southern League Division One S&W
2	Dawlish Town	40	25	11	4	103	45	+58	86	
3	Willand Rovers	40	22	10	8	78	48	+30	76	
4	Frome Town	40	21	11	8	86	41	+45	74	
5	Corsham Town	40	20	11	9	71	63	+8	71	
6	Bideford	40	17	17	6	85	46	+39	68	
7	Bitton	40	19	7	14	71	46	+25	64	
8	Ilfracombe Town	40	19	7	14	76	69	+7	64	
9	Welton Rovers	40	17	10	13	44	35	+9	61	
10	Devizes Town	40	16	12	12	68	70	−2	60	
11	Melksham Town	40	13	12	15	51	57	−6	51	
12	Barnstaple Town	40	14	8	18	71	67	+4	50	
13	Brislington	40	12	13	15	55	61	−6	49	
14	Calne Town	40	15	4	21	57	70	−13	49	
15	Hallen	40	13	10	17	64	81	−17	49	
16	Bristol Manor Farm	40	10	9	21	64	84	−20	39	
17	Radstock Town	40	10	8	22	60	83	−23	38	
18	Street	40	8	9	23	36	80	−44	33	
19	Bishop Sutton	40	7	8	25	41	99	−58	29	
20	Chard Town	40	8	4	28	53	104	−51	28	
21	Odd Down (R)	40	5	7	28	30	108	−78	22	Relegation to the First Division

Updated to match(es) played on 4 May 2008. Source:
Rules for classification: 1) points; 2) goal difference; 3) number of goals scored.
(C) Champions; (P) Promoted; (R) Relegated

== First Division ==
The First Division featured three new clubs in a league of 21, reduced from 22 the previous season after Truro City and Ilfracombe Town were promoted to the Premier Division, Biddestone resigned and Clyst Rovers transferred to the South West Peninsula League.

- Keynsham Town, relegated from the Premier Division.
- Oldland Abbotonians, promoted as third-place finishers in the Somerset County League.
- Roman Glass St George, promoted as champions of the Gloucestershire County League.

=== Final table ===
Pos	Team	Pld	W	D	L	GF	GA	GD	Pts	Promotion or relegation
1	Wellington (C, P)	40	27	8	5	124	45	+79	89	Promotion to the Premier Division
2	Sherborne Town (P)	40	26	7	7	111	41	+70	85	Promotion to the Premier Division
3	Larkhall Athletic	40	26	7	7	87	43	+44	85	
4	Shrewton United	40	23	5	12	82	71	+11	74	
5	Cadbury Heath	40	22	7	11	82	59	+23	73	
6	Hengrove Athletic	40	20	9	11	83	61	+22	69	
7	Westbury United	40	20	8	12	92	62	+30	68	
8	Longwell Green Sports	40	19	11	10	71	47	+24	68	
9	Portishead	40	17	12	11	81	59	+22	63	
10	Roman Glass St George	40	15	10	15	70	55	+15	55	
11	Shepton Mallet	40	16	5	19	71	79	−8	53	
12	Oldland Abbotonians	40	13	11	16	80	77	+3	50	
13	Bradford Town	40	14	8	18	62	84	−22	50	
14	Keynsham Town	40	14	7	19	51	67	−16	49	
15	Clevedon United	40	12	8	20	50	75	−25	44	
16	Elmore	40	11	7	22	73	106	−33	40	
17	Minehead Town	40	10	10	20	55	96	−41	40	
18	Bridport	40	10	6	24	64	77	−13	36	
19	Backwell United	40	7	10	23	48	101	−53	31	Resigned at the end of the season
20	Almondsbury	40	6	12	22	44	82	−38	30	
21	Weston St Johns (R)	40	5	6	29	54	148	−94	21	Relegation to the Somerset County League

Updated to match(es) played on 3 May 2008. Source:
Rules for classification: 1) points; 2) goal difference; 3) number of goals scored.
(C) Champions; (P) Promoted; (R) Relegated
