= Treyew Road =

Former football stadium in Truro, England

- Interactive map of Treyew Road
- Address: Treyew Road; Truro; TR1 2TH
- Coordinates: 50°15′33″N 5°03′57″W
- Capacity: 3,200 (1,675 seats)
- Surface: Grass

Construction
- Demolished: 2021

Tenant
- Truro City (1905–2018, 2019–2021)

Treyew Road in Truro, Cornwall, was a football stadium which was the home ground of Truro City until 2021.

Prior to its closure, it had a capacity of 3,200, 1,675 seated.

== History ==
For most of its history, Truro City played its home matches at Treyew Road. The ground had been associated with the club since the early 20th century. Newspaper reports from 1905 indicate that Truro City and Truro Cricket Club explored a joint arrangement to secure the playing fields from Lord Falmouth at a cost of £60 per annum, although no formal agreement is explicitly recorded. Subsequent reports in later years suggest that the ground was ultimately brought into use by the clubs. A covered terrace was in place behind one of the goals until the mid-1970s when a road widening scheme resulted in it being removed. In later years, the ground was renovated, with two new stands on opposite sides of the ground lifting the capacity to approximately 3,000.

In 2014, Truro City sold the stadium, and were given four years to relocate. The club were forced to move nearly 90 miles when they ground shared at Torquay United's Plainmoor for the first half of the 2018–19 National League South season, before striking an agreement to return to Treyew Road in January 2019.

Truro City were bought by rugby union club Cornish Pirates in March 2019, and were set to ground share at the proposed purpose-built Stadium for Cornwall at a future date, but in June 2022, Cornwall Council dropped the scheme due to a lack of funding.

== Closure ==
Truro City vacated the ground at the end of the COVID-curtailed 2020–21 Southern League Premier South season. The White Tigers' final game at the ground was on 27 October 2020, a 4–1 victory against Wimborne Town.

With the Stadium for Cornwall plan stalling, and later in 2022 being dropped, the club again moved, nearly 60 miles this time, to groundshare at Plymouth Parkway's Bolitho Park, with the groundshare beginning for the 2021–22 season.

Treyew Road was demolished in 2021, and a Lidl supermarket was built in its place, opening in July 2022.
