= Threemilestone =

Village in Cornwall, England

Coordinates: 50.2634°N 5.1145°W

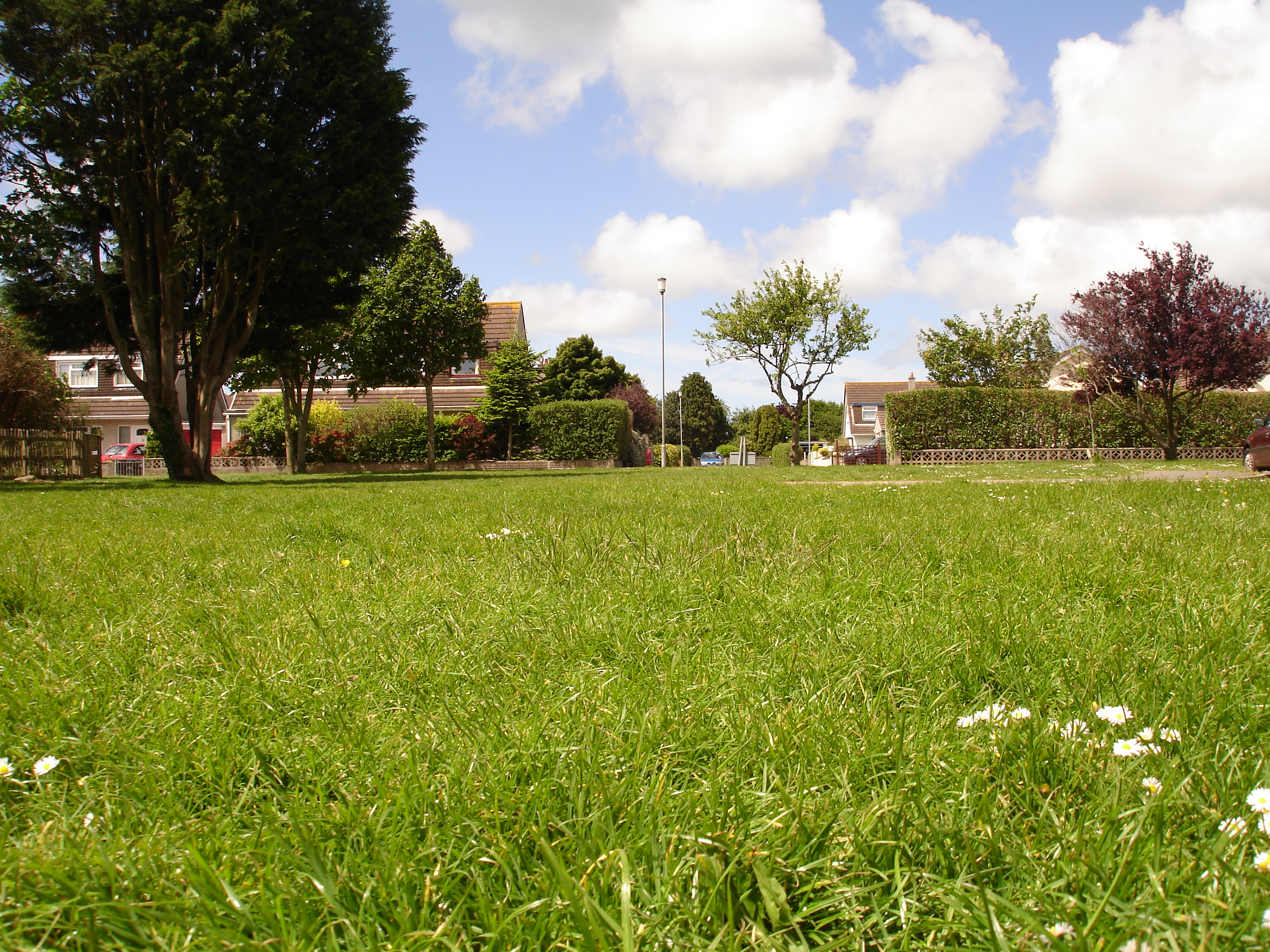
Threemilestone Green

Threemilestone (Cornish: Mentrimildir) is a small village in the civil parish of Kenwyn, located precisely three miles west of Truro, the only city in Cornwall, England, United Kingdom. Threemilestone has grown in recent years, as housing estates to the west have been developed. Between Truro and Threemilestone there is a continuous line of schools, colleges and industrial estates, including Truro College and Richard Lander School. Furthermore the village also houses a primary school (known locally: Threemilestone Primary School).

== Amenities ==
In Threemilestone itself, there is a central area of shops and facilities, which includes a Spar shop, a Co-Op Supermarket, a baker (Warrens), fish & chip shop (Kellaway´s Fish and Chips), butchers, chemist, doctor's surgery (Lander Medical Practice), launderette, hair salon (Lowenek Hair and Beauty), barbers (Threemilestone Barber Shop), post office, community centre, Victoria Inn (Public House), and social club, Methodist church, a dental practice, and a Chinese takeaway.

Threemilestone is also the location for a park-and-ride scheme that serves the A390. The park-and-ride resulted in an estimated removal of 118,000 cars from the road during its first 9 months of operation. The park and ride is, therefore, an important piece of infrastructure, for the residents of Threemilestone and people travelling into Truro.

It is also home to the West Truro Retail Park, including: a British Heart Foundation home store, Home Bargains, Oak furnitureland, DFS, Subway, a Costa Coffee drive-thru, Wickes and Matalan.

== Leisure ==
The village also has a football club called Threemilestone A.F.C. which currently runs four sides, a first team, reserve team, veterans side and a youth team. The club currently play their home games at Boscawen Park in Truro, however the hope is to return to the Polstain Road pitch in the future. There are a few parks in the area including Leap Park and Swing Park in the west side of Threemilestone.

== Cornish wrestling ==
There have been Cornish wrestling tournaments held in Threemilestone throughout the last 200 years. Tournaments have been held in the field adjoining the Welcome Inn at Sticklers' Corner (note that a Stickler is a referee in a Cornish wrestling match) and at the Victoria Arms.

== Gallery ==
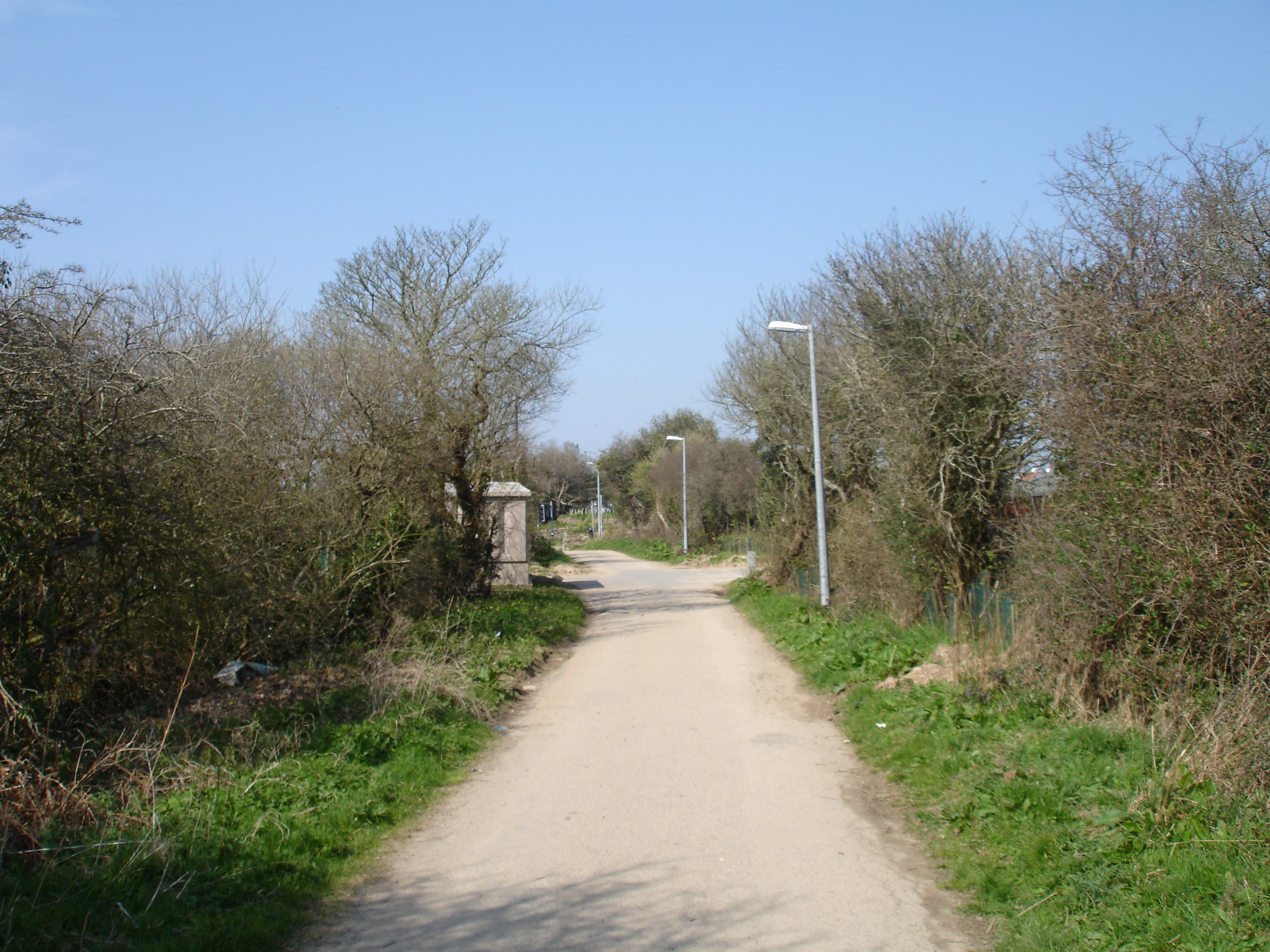
Threemilestone Backlanes

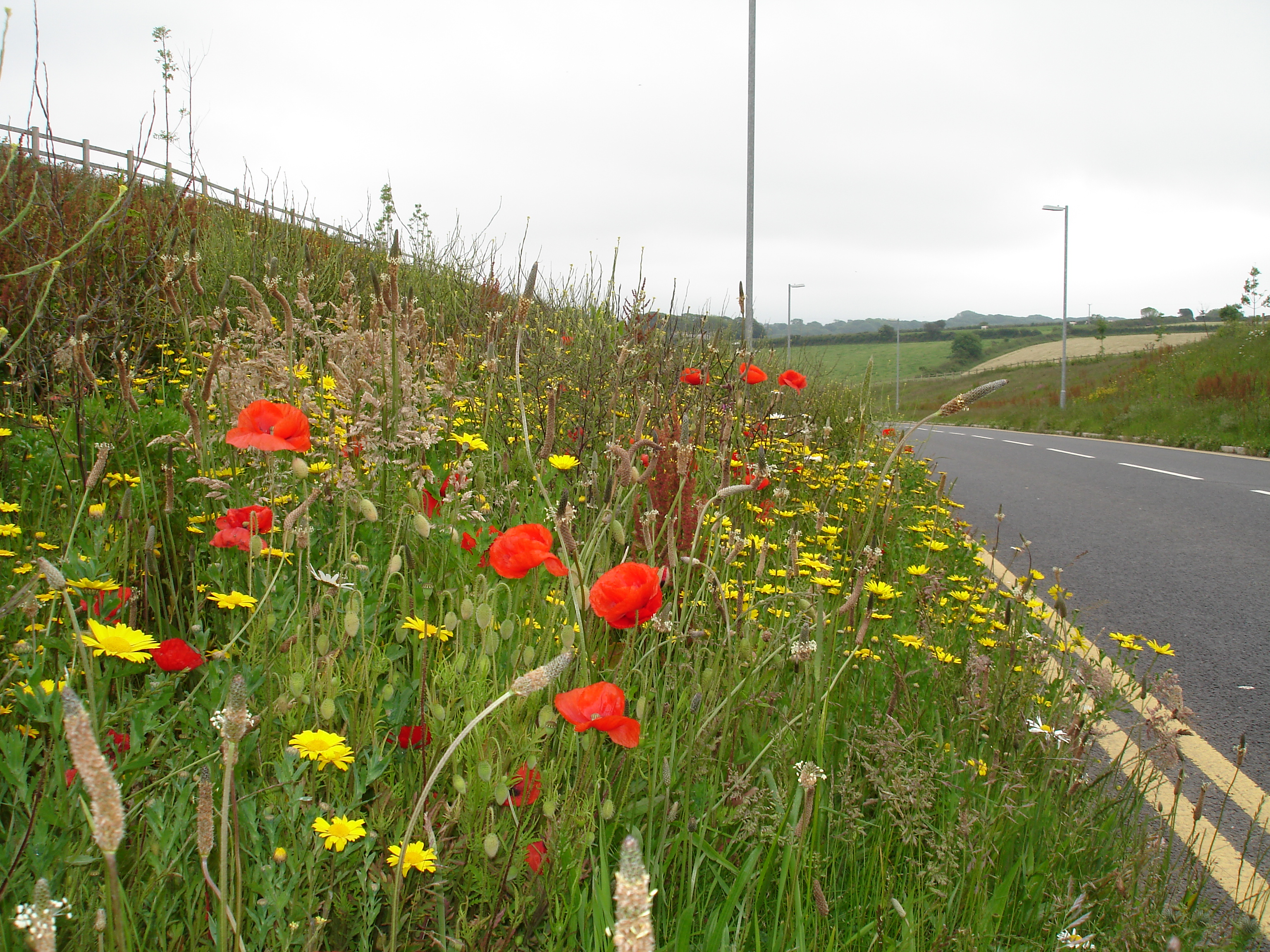
Richard Lander Road

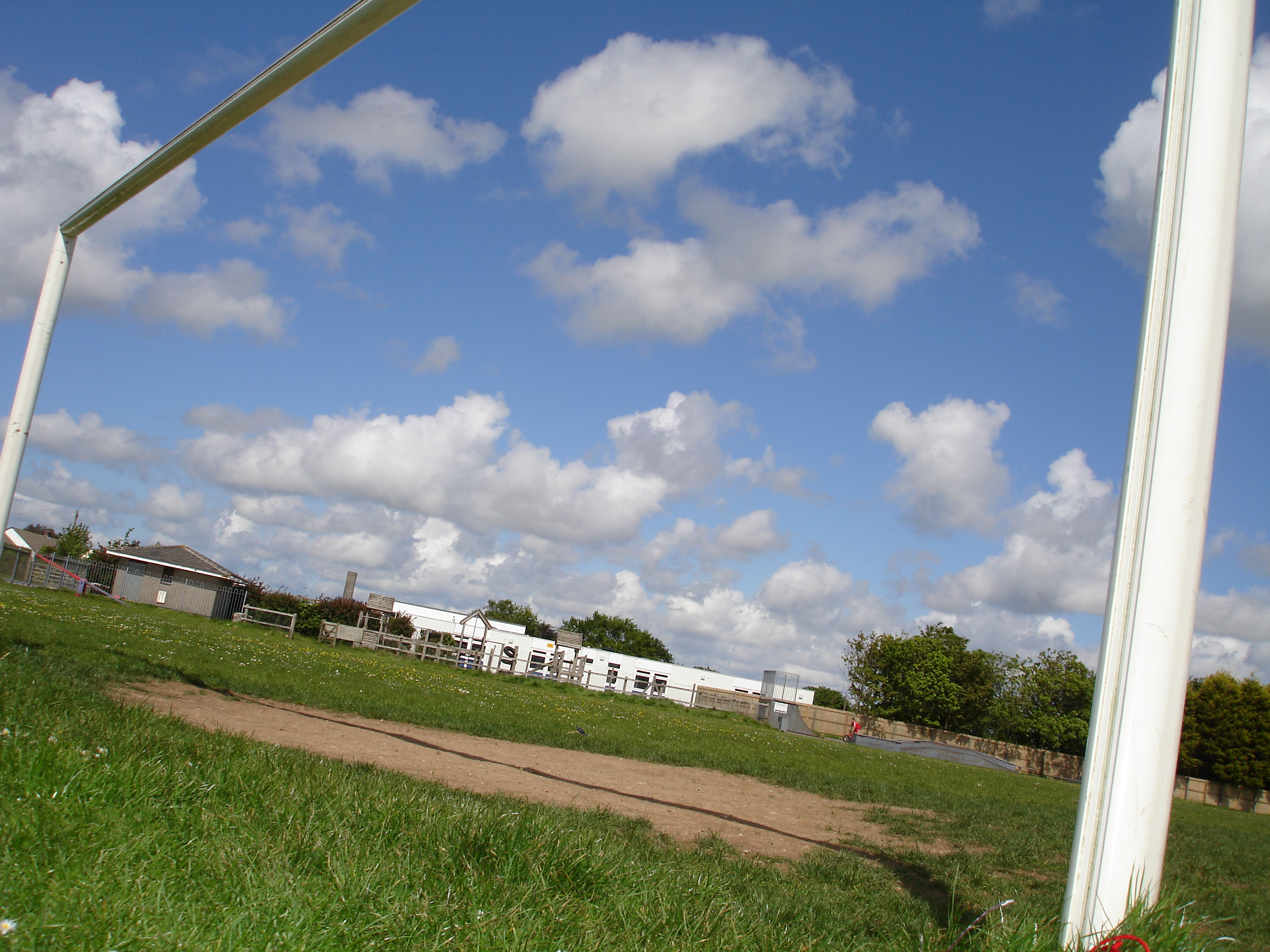
Threemilestone Playing Field
