= Wiltshire County FA Senior Cup =

Wiltshire FA Senior Cup
- Founded: 1886; 140 years ago
- Region: Wiltshire
- Teams: 17 (2023–24)
- Current champions: Warminster Town (4th title)
- Most championships: Devizes Town (15 titles)
- Website: Whiltshire FA

The Wiltshire FA Senior Cup is the county cup in Wiltshire and has seniority over the Wiltshire Premier Shield according to the Wiltshire County FA Handbook. It is administered by the Wiltshire Football Association.

According to the current rules of the competition, it is open to all clubs whose first affiliation is with the Wiltshire County FA and who play at levels 5, 6 or 7 below the top four tiers of the English football league system. Clubs can be exempt upon payment of a fee. The most successful side is Devizes Town with 14 titles.

== List of Finals ==
This section lists every final of the competition played since 1885, the winners, the runners-up, and the result.

=== Key ===
Match went to a replay
Match went to extra time
Match decided by a penalty shootout after extra time
Shared trophy

Season	Winners	Result	Runner-up	Notes
1886–87	Swindon Town	3–1	Trowbridge Town	
1887–88	Swindon Town	5–0	Swindon Temperance	
1888–89	Swindon Town	7–0	Swindon Temperance	
1889–90	Swindon Town	7–1	Trowbridge	
1890–91	Swindon Town	2–0	Swindon Town reserves	
1891–92	Swindon Town	13–0	Swindon Town reserves	
1892–93	Swindon Athletic	3–1	Trowbridge	
1893–94	Swindon Wanderers	3–2	Calne	
1894–95	Trowbridge	2–0	Calne	
1895–96	Swindon Town reserves Trowbridge			Trophy shared.
1896–97	Swindon Town	3–0	Trowbridge	
1897–98	Trowbridge	6–1	Swindon Victoria	
1898–99	Swindon Victoria		Devizes Town	
1899–1900	Chippenham Town		Devizes Town	
1900–01	Warminster Town	1–0	Even Swindon United	
1901–02	Chippenham Town		Swindon Town reserves	
1902–03	Warminster Town	3–1	Wootton Bassett Town	Replay. First match ended 0–0.
1903–04	Swindon Town	3–0	Wootton Bassett Town	
1904–05	Melksham Town		Swindon Haydon St. Workmen	
1905–06	Salisbury City (1905)		Swindon Haydon St. Workmen	
1906–07	Swindon Town	2–0	Trowbridge	Replay. First match ended 2–2.
1907–08	Devizes Town	3–1	Trowbridge	
1908–09	Swindon Town reserves		Trowbridge	
1909–10	Salisbury City (1905)		Warminster Town	
1910–11	Warminster Town		Salisbury City (1905)	
1911–12	38th Brigade Field Artillery		Calne	
1912–13	Calne	1–0	Trowbridge	Replay. First match ended 1–1.
1913–14	3rd Bn Wiltshire Regiment		Chippenham Town	
1914–19	No competition due to World War I.			
1919–20	Swindon Town		Salisbury City (1905)	
1920–21	Swindon Victoria		Stratton Reform	
1921–22	Trowbridge		Chippenham Town	
1922–23	Salisbury City (1905)		Devizes	
1923–24	Spencers		Swindon Victoria	
1924–25	Chippenham Town		Swindon Victoria	
1925–26	Trowbridge		1st Bn Wiltshire Regiment	
1926–27	Chippenham Town		Warminster Town	
1927–28	Swindon Corinthians		Chippenham Town	
1928–29	Chippenham Town		Swindon Corinthians	
1929–30	Garrad Athletics		Trowbridge	
1930–31	Chippenham Town		Swindon Corinthians	
1931–32	Westbury United		Swindon Victoria	
1932–33	Westbury United		Warminster Town	
1933–34	Trowbridge	3–1	Westbury United	Replay. First match ended 0–0.
1934–35	Swindon Corinthians		Swindon Victoria	
1935–36	Salisbury Corinthians	3–2	Swindon Corinthians	Replay. First match ended 2–2.
1936–37	Swindon Victoria		Salisbury Corinthians	
1937–38	Trowbridge Town		1st Survey Co. Royal Artillery	
1938–39	Purton		Swindon Corinthians	
1939–45	No competition due to World War II.			
1945–46	Salisbury Corinthians	2–0	Chippenham Town	
1946–47	Swindon G.W.R. Corinthians		Pewsey Vale	
1947–48	Westbury United		Swindon B.R. Corinthians	
1948–49	Purton		Swindon B.R. Corinthians	
1949–50	Devizes Town		Calne & Harris United	
1950–51	Purton		Salisbury City (1905)	
1951–52	Westbury United		Bulford United	
1952–53	Pinehurst Youth Centre		Swindon Victoria	
1953–54	Pinehurst Youth Centre		Warminster Town	
1954–55	Purton		Bulford United	
1955–56	Swindon		Victoria Downton	
1956–57	Devizes Town		Swindon B.R.	
1957–58	Devizes Town		Melksham	
1958–59	Devizes Town		Swindon B.R.	
1959–60	Pinehurst		Devizes Town	
1960–61	Devizes Town		Pinehurst	
1961–62	Devizes Town		Malmesbury	
1962–63	Devizes Town	4–1	Highworth Town	
1963–64	Highworth Town		Westbury United	
1964–65	Pinehurst		Chippenham Town	
1965–66	Devizes Town		Aldbourne	
1966–67	Pinehurst		Devizes Town	
1967–68	Devizes Town		Melksham Town	
1968–69	Chippenham Town		Melksham Town	
1969–70	Melksham Town		Devizes Town	
1970–71	Devizes Town		Pinehurst	
1971–72	Devizes Town		Sanford Youth Centre	
1972–73	Highworth Town	2–1	Devizes Town	
1973–74	Devizes Town		Park	
1974–75	Chippenham Town		Vickers	
1975–76	Pinehurst		Devizes Town	
1976–77	Corsham Town	3–2	Park	(Note: Score found in Witlshire Gazette & Herlad article 12 Apr 2002)
1977–78	Melksham Town		Avon Bradford	
1978–79	Devizes Town		Ferndale Athletic	
1979–80	Downton	4–1	Park	(Note: Played at melksham)
1980–81	Downton		Tisbury United	
1981–82	Avebury		Melksham Town reserves	
1982–83	Penhill		Chippenham Town reserves	
1983–84	Amesbury Town	2–1	Penhill	
1984–85	Calne Town		Supermarine	
1985–86	Supermarine	2–0	Penhill	
1986–87	Penhill	2–0	Bemerton Athletic	
1987–88	Purton	1–0	Wootton Bassett Town	
1988–89	Purton	3–2	Highworth Town	After extra-time.
1989–90	Swindon Athletic		Pewsey Vale	
1990–91	Pewsey Vale	2–1	Swindon Athletic	
1991–92	Wollen Sports	3–1	Downton	
1992–93	Bemerton Heath Harlequins	3–1	Wollen Sports	
1993–94	Amesbury Town	2–1	Swindon Supermarine	
1994–95	Purton	1–0	Downton	
1995–96	Highworth Town	3–0	Amesbury Town	
1996–97	Corsham Town	4–1	Marlborough Town	
1997–98	Highworth Town	2–1	Purton	After extra-time.
1998–99	Wootton Bassett Town	3–2	Pewsey Vale	After extra-time.
1999–2000	Pewsey Vale	0–0	Purton	Pewsey Vale won 3–2 on penalties. After extra-time.
2000–01	Wootton Bassett Town	2–0	Shrewton Town	
2001–02	Malmesbury Victoria	1–0	Pewsey Vale	
2002–03	Melksham Town	2–1	Trowbridge Town	
2003–04	Trowbridge Town	2–2	Corsham Town	Trowbridge Town won 5–3 on penalties. After extra-time.
2004–05	Corsham Town	3–1	Bemerton Heath Harlequins	
2005–06	Corsham Town	2–2	Melksham Town	Corsham Town won 5–4 on penalties. After extra-time.
2006–07	Corsham Town	1–0	Melksham Town	
2007–08	Melksham Town	5–2	Laverstock & Ford	
2008–09	Highworth Town	2–1	Warminster Town	After extra-time.
2009–10	Calne Town	4–3	Laverstock & Ford	
2010–11	Bemerton Heath Harlequins	2–0	Bradford Town	
2011–12	Calne Town	2–1	Bemerton Heath Harlequins	
2012–13	Melksham Town	2–0	Downton	After extra-time.
2013–14	Melksham Town	3–3	Bradford Town	Melksham Town won 3–2 on penalties. After extra-time.
2014–15	Highworth Town	2–1	Bradford Town	
2015–16	Melksham Town	2–0	Salisbury City	
2016–17	Swindon Supermarine	2–1	Highworth Town	
2017–18	Chippenham Town	3–0	Highworth Town	
2018–19	Swindon Supermarine	3–1	Salisbury	
2019–20	Competition suspended due to COVID-19 pandemic.			
2020–21	Competition not held due to COVID-19 pandemic.			
2021–22	Downton	2–0	Bemerton Heath Harlequins	
2022–23	Downton	6–2	Wroughton	
2023–24	Downton	1–1	Amesbury Town	Downton won 4–1 on penalties. After extra-time.
2024-25	Devizes Town	3–0	Wroughton	
2025-26	Warminster Town	2–1	Devizes Town	

=== Wins by teams ===
Club	Wins	First final won	Last final won	Runner-up	Last final lost	Total final apps.	Notes
Devizes Town	15	1907–08	2024-25	8	1975–76	23	
Swindon Town	12	1886–87	1919–20	3	1901–02	15	(Note: Won 2 titles as Swindon Town reserves. Played two finals against their reserves team.)
Chippenham Town	9	1899–1900	2017–18	6	1982–83	15	
Trowbridge Town	8	1894–95	2003–04	10	2002–03	18	(Note: Won 6 titles as Trowbridge.)
Melksham Town	8	1904–05	2015–16	6	2006–07	14	
Purton	7	1938–39	1994–95	2	1999–2000	9	
Highworth Town	6	1963–64	2014–15	4	2017–18	10	
Downton	5	1979–80	2023–24	3	2012–13	8	
Corsham Town	5	1976–77	2006–07	1	2003–04	6	
Calne Town	4	1912–13	2011–12	4	1949–50	8	(Note: Won 1 title as Calne.)
Pinehurst †	4	1959–60	1975–76	2	1970–71	6	(Note: Dissolved in 2004.)
Westbury United	4	1931–32	1951–52	2	1963–64	6	
Warminster Town	4	1900–01	1910–11	5	2025-26	9	
Swindon Victoria †	3	1898–99	1936–37	6	1952–53	9	(Note: Dissolved in 1975.)
Penhill †	3	1982–83	1989–90	3	1990–91	4	(Note: Dissolved in 1992. Won 1 title as Swindon Athletic. Different from Swindon Athletic that won in 1892–93.)
Salisbury City (1905) †	3	1905–06	1922–23	3	1950–51	6	(Note: Dissolved in 1940s.)
Pewsey Vale	2	1990–91	1999–2000	4	2001–02	6	
Swindon Corinthians †	2	1927–28	1934–35	4	1938–39	6	(Note: Dissolved in mid-20th century.)
Bemerton Heath Harlequins	2	1992–93	2010–11	3	2021–22	5	
Wootton Bassett Town	2	1998–99	2000–01	3	1987–88	5	
Amesbury Town	2	1983–84	1993–94	2	2023–24	4	
Salisbury Corinthians †	2	1935–36	1945–46	1	1936–37	3	(Note: Dissolved in 1950s.)
Swindon Supermarine	2	2016–17	2018–19	1	1993–94	3	
Pinehurst Youth Centre †	2	1952–53	1953–54	0	–	2	(Note: Dissolved in 1960s.)
Supermarine †	1	1985–86	1985–86	1	1984–85	2	(Note: Dissolved in 1992.)
Wollen Sports	1	1991–92	1991–92	1	1992–93	2	
38th Brigade Field Artillery	1	1911–12	1911–12	0	–	1	
3rd Bn Wiltshire Regiment	1	1913–14	1913–14	0	–	1	
Avebury	1	1981–82	1981–82	0	–	1	
Garrad Athletics †	1	1929–30	1929–30	0	–	1	(Note: Dissolved.)
Malmesbury Victoria	1	2001–02	2001–02	0	–	1	
Spencers †	1	1923–24	1923–24	0	–	1	(Note: Dissolved.)
Swindon †	1	1955–56	1955–56	0	–	1	(Note: Dissolved.)
Swindon G.W.R. Corinthians †	1	1946–47	1946–47	0	–	1	(Note: Dissolved.)
Swindon Wanderers †	1	1893–94	1893–94	0	–	1	(Note: Dissolved in 1910.)

== Recent Competitions ==
=== 2008–09 ===
First round

11 Nov 08
15:00 GMT

Marlborough Town	0–1	Wootton Bassett Town

Elcot Lane Playing Field
Referee: Nathan Strong
11 Nov 08
15:00 GMT

Pewsey Vale	2–3	Shrewton United

Recreation Ground
Referee: Stacey Woodley
11 Nov 08
15:00 GMT

Trowbridge Town	1–2	Bromham

Woodmarsh
Referee: Roger Smith
11 Nov 08
15:00 GMT

Southbrook	0–8	New College Swindon

Southbrook Recreation
Referee: Gordon Ashworth
11 Nov 08
15:00 GMT

FC Chippenham Youth	3–5	Downton

Stanley Park
Referee: Kevin Barnett
11 Nov 08
15:00 GMT

Amesbury Town	3–0	Malmesbury Victoria

Amesbury Recreation Ground
Referee: Paul Collyer
11 Nov 08
15:00 GMT

Bradford Town	5–1	Wroughton

Bradford Sports and social Club
Referee: Paul Humphrey
11 Nov 08
15:00 GMT

Purton	2–3	Warminster Town

The Red House
Referee: Adrian Cripps
11 Nov 08
15:00 GMT

Westbury United	6–0	Cricklade Town

Meadow Lane
Referee: Adrian Hunt

Second Round

15 Nov 08
15:00 GMT

Westbury United	2–4	Highworth Town

Meadow Lane
Referee: Mark Niemerski
15 Nov 08
15:00 GMT

Downton	4–4 (a.e.t.)	Corsham Town
Penalties
	4–5

Brian Whitehead Sports centre
Referee: Nicholas Norris
15 Nov 08
15:00 GMT

Melksham Town	5–0	Amesbury Town

The Conigre
Referee: Adrian Cripps
18 Nov 08
15:00 GMT

Laverstock & Ford	2–1	New College Swindon

Church Road, Laverstock
Referee: Shaun Tobin
15 Nov 08
15:00 GMT

Warminster Town	3–2	Devizes Town

Weymouth Street
Referee: Daniel Jacecko
22 Nov 08
15:00 GMT

Wootton Bassett Town	6–0	Bromham

Corinium Stadium, Cirencester
Referee: Tony Sharkey
15 Nov 08
15:00 GMT

Calne Town	3–2	Shrewton United

Bremhill View
Referee: Adrian Matthews
11 Nov 08
15:00 GMT

Bremerton Heath Harlequins	1–0	Bradford Town

The Clubhouse, Salisbury
Referee: James (Rick) Whitehead

Quarter Finals

17 Jan 09
15:00 GMT

Wootton Bassett Town	2 -1	Corsham Town

Corinium Stadium, Cirencester
Referee: Matthew Rushton
24 Jan 09
15:00 GMT

Laverstock & Ford	2–3	Melksham Town

Church Road, Laverstock
Referee: Alan Bird
17 Jan 09
15:00 GMT

Warminster Town	3–2	Calne Town

Weymouth Street
Referee: Adam Nunn
17 Nov 09
15:00 GMT

Bemerton Heath Harlequins	0–3	Highworth Town

The Clubhouse, Salisbury
Referee: Simon Pritchard

Semi-Finals

1 Mar 09
15:00 GMT

Warminster Town	2–1	Wootton Bassett Town
	Report

Weymouth Street
Referee: Michael Hunter
25 Mar 09
15:00 GMT

Highworth Town	2–1	Melksham Town
	Report

Hardenhuish Park, Chippenham
Referee: Iain Parsons

Final

22 Apr 09
15:00 GMT

Warminster Town	1–2 (a.e.t.)	Highworth Town
Welch 39'	Report	Rudd 51'; Bennett 115'

Hardenhuish Park, Chippenham

=== 2009–10 ===
First round

10 Oct 09
15:00 GMT

Pewsey Vale	2–7	Shrewton United

Recreation Ground
Referee: William Hawkins
10 Oct 09
15:00 GMT

Purton	3–0	New College Swindon

The Red House
Referee: Roger Smith
10 Oct 09
15:00 GMT

Devizes Town	4–3	Cricklade Town

Nurstead Road
Referee: Nicholas Norris
10 Oct 09
15:00 GMT

Corsham Town	10–1	Southbrook

Referee: Paul Collyer
10 Oct 09
15:00 GMT

Malmesbury Victoria	3–1	Wroughton

Flying Monk Playing Fields
Referee: Ian Trueman
10 Oct 09
15:00 GMT

Trowbridge Town	1–0	Amesbury Town

Woodmarsh
Referee: Nigel Sykes
10 Oct 09
15:00 GMT

Downton	2–0	KC's F.C.

Brian Whitehead Sports Centre
Referee: John Bishop
10 Oct 09
15:00 GMT

Calne Town	3–2	FC Chippenham Youth

North End
Referee: Kevin Barnett
10 Oct 09
15:00 GMT

Marlborough Town	2–1	Westbury United

Elcot Lane
Referee: James (Rick) Whitehead

Second Round

14 Nov 09
15:00 GMT

Marlborough Town	0–4	Highworth Town

Elcot Lane
Referee: Adrian Hunt
14 Nov 09
15:00 GMT

Malmesbury Victoria	2–1	Devizes Town

Flying Monk Playing Fields
Referee: Mark Niemirski
14 Nov 09
15:00 GMT

Shrewton United	4–3	Wootton Bassett Town

Recreation Ground
Referee: Philip Miles
25 Nov 09
15:00 GMT

Warminster Town	1–2 (a.e.t.)	Corsham Town

Weymouth Street
Referee: Michael Hunter
14 Nov 09
15:00 GMT

Melksham Town	2–1	Trwobridge Town

The Conigre
Referee: Shaun Tobin
21 Nov 09
15:00 GMT

Purton	3–4	Laverstock & Ford

The Red House
Referee: James (Rick) Whitehead
07 Nov 09
15:00 GMT

Calne Town	2–2 (a.e.t.)	Bradford Town
Penalties
	4–3

Bremhill View
Referee: Paul Humphrey
07 Nov 09
15:00 GMT

Bremerton Heath Harlequins	4–1 (a.e.t.)	Downton

The Clubhouse, Salisbury
Referee: Nicholas Norris

Quarter Finals

26 Jan 10
19:45 GMT

Shrewton United	0 -3	Calne Town

Recreation Ground
Referee: Iain Parsons
09 Feb 10
15:00 GMT

Malmesbury Victoria	1–3	Melksham Town

Flying Monk Playing Fields
Referee: Ian Restell
19 Jan 10
19:450 GMT

Corsham Town	2–3	Bemerton Heath Harlequins

Referee: Alan Bird
23 Jan 10
15:00 GMT

Laverstock & Ford	3–2	Highworth Town

Church Road
Referee: Michael Hunter

Semi-Finals

26 Apr 10
19:45 GMT

Bemerton Heath Harlequins	1–2 (a.e.t.)	Calne Town

Weymouth Street
Referee: Matthew Rushton
16 Mar 10
19:30 GMT

Melksham Town	1–5	Laverstock & Ford

Weymouth Street
Referee: Alan Bird

Final

04 May 10
19:45 GMT

Laverstock & Ford	3–4	Calne Town
Gallagher 60'; 64'; 65'	Report	Dolman 6', 25'; King 53', 68'

Raymond McEnhill Stadium, Salisbury

=== 2010–11 ===
First round

09 Oct 10
15:00 GMT

New College Swindon	0–3	Warminster Town

Supermarine Sports and Social Club
26 Oct 10
19:30 GMT

Bradford Town	7–1	Chalke Valley

Supermarine Sports and Social Club
09 Oct 10
15:00 GMT

Pewsey Vale	0–2	Corsham Town

Recreation Ground
10 Oct 09
15:00 GMT

Wroughton	0–4	Purton

WeirField
09 Oct 10
15:00 GMT

Westbury United	4–3	Wootton Bassett Town

Meadow Lane
19 Oct 10
19:30 GMT

Amesbury Town	2–0	Shrewton United

Amesbury Recreation Ground
10 Oct 09
15:00 GMT

Devizes Town	0–1	FC Chippenham Youth

Nurstead Road

Second Round

13 Nov 10
15:00 GMT

Highworth Town	3–0	Amesbury Town

Highworth Town, Chippenham
Referee: Paul Collyer
13 Nov 10
15:00 GMT

Corsham Town	1–1 (a.e.t.)	Laverstock & Ford
Penalties
	4–5

Referee: Daniel Jacecko
17 Nov 10
19:30 GMT

Melksham Town	3–0	Westbury United

The Conigre
27 Oct 10
19:30 GMT

Calne Town	1–4	Downton

North End
01 Nov 10
19:30 GMT

Bemerton Heath Harlequins	2–0	Warminster Town

The Clubhouse
11 Jan 11
19:45 GMT

Malmesbury Victoria	0–7	Bradford Town

Flying Monk Playing Field
Referee: Oliver Ballinger
13 Nov 10
14:00 GMT

Trowbridge Town	2–1 (a.e.t.)	FC Chippenham Youth

Woodmarsh
Referee: Paul Humphrey
13 Nov 10
14:00 GMT

Cricklade Town	1–4	Purton

Cricklade Leisure Centre
Referee: Piers Mountgarret

Quarter Finals

15 Jan 11
15:00 GMT

Highworth Town	4 -1	Laverstock & Ford

Hardenhuish Park, Chippenham
Referee: Kevin Barnett
15 Jan 11
15:00 GMT

Downton	4–1	Melksham Town

Brian Whitehead Sports Centre
Referee: Michael Hunter
15 Jan 11
15:00 GMT

Bemerton Heath Harlequins	5–3 (a.e.t.)	Purton

The Clubhouse
Referee: John Bishop
15 Feb 11
19:30 GMT

Bradford Town	3–1	Trowbridge Town

Bradford Sports and Social Club
Referee: Shaun Tobin

Semi-Finals

22 Mar 11
19:45 GMT

Bemerton Heath Harlequins	3–0	Highworth Town

The Clubhouse
15 Mar 11
19:45 GMT

Bradford Town	3–2	Downton

Bradford Sports and Social Club

Final

03 May 11
19:45 GMT

Bemerton Heath Harlequins	2–0	Bradford Town
Mankin	Report

Supermarine Sports Club, Swindon
Referee: Daniel Jacecko

=== 2011–12 ===
First round

26 Nov 11

FC Sandford	4–2	Trowbridge Town

Woodmarsh, Trowbridge
Referee: Adrian Hunt
08 Oct 11
15:00 GMT

Pewsey Vale	4–2	Wootton Bassett Town

Recreation Ground, Pewsey
Referee: Ben Williamson
08 Oct 11
15:00 GMT

Warminster Town	4–2 (a.e.t.)	Purton

Weymouth Street, Warminster
Referee: Anthony Welsh
08 Oct 11
15:00 GMT

Calne Town	3–0	Malmesbury Victoria

North End, Calne
Referee: Piers Mountgarret
08 Oct 11
15:00 GMT

Corsham Town	4–2	Laverstock & Ford

Referee: Roger Smith
08 Oct 11
15:00 GMT

New College Swindon	1–4 (a.e.t.)	Shrewton United

Supermarine Sports and Social Club, Swindon
Referee: Oliver Ballinger
08 Oct 11
15:00 GMT

Melksham Town	4–0	Devizes Town

The Cigre
Referee: Philip Staynings
08 Oct 11
15:00 GMT

FC Chippenham Youth	3–1	Sks Blyskawica F.C.

Stanley Park, Chippenham
Referee: Malcolm Carter
08 Oct 11
15:00 GMT

Southbrook	0–1	Wroughton

Southbrook Recreation
Referee: Nigel Fisher
08 Oct 11
15:00 GMT

Amesbury Town	0–0 (a.e.t.)	Westbury United
Penalties
	4–5

Amesbury Recreation Ground
Referee: John Bishop
08 Oct 11
15:00 GMT

Cricklade Town	0–1	Marlborough Town

Cricklade Leisure Centre
Referee: Alan Baldwin
15 Oct 11
15:00 GMT

Beversbrook	2–4	Ludgershall Sports

Beversbrook Site, Calne
Referee: Stuart Wootton

Second Round

12 Nov 11
15:00 GMT

Melksham Town	5–3	Marlborough Town

The Conigre
Referee: Shaun Tobin
12 Nov 11
15:00 GMT

Downton	2–1	Westbury United

Brian Whitehead Sports Centre
Referee: Mark Yeats
12 Nov 11
15:00 GMT

Calne Town	4–0	FC Sandford

North End
Referee: Mark Niemirski
12 Nov 11
14:30 GMT

FC Chippenham Youth	0–8	Shrewton United

Stanley Park, Chippenham
Referee: Robert Sayers
12 Nov 11
15:00 GMT

Bradford Town	0–2	Bemerton Heath Harlequins

Bradford Sports and Social Club
Referee: Nigel Sykes
12 Jan 11
15:00 GMT

Highworth Town	5–0	Ludgershall Sports

Hardenhuish Park, Chippenham
Referee: Kevin Barnett
12 Nov 11
15:00 GMT

Warminster Town	6–1	Wroughton

Weymouth Street
Referee: Paul Collyer
12 Nov 11
15:00 GMT

Corsham Town	2–1	Pewsey Vale

Referee: Adrian Matthews

Quarter Finals

24 Jan 12
19:30 GMT

Shrewton United	4 -3	Melksham Town

Shrewton Rec
Referee: Anthony Welsh
14 Jan 12
15:00 GMT

Highworth Town	4–3 (a.e.t.)	Warminster Town

Hardenhuish Park, Chippenham
Referee: Philip Staynings
14 Jan 12
15:00 GMT

Bemerton Heath Harlequins	6–1	Corsham Town

The Clubhouse
Referee: Paul Humphrey
21 Jan 12
19:45 GMT

Downton	1–3	Calne Town

Brian Whitehead Sports Centre
Referee: John Bishop

Semi-Finals

20 Mar 12
19:30 GMT

Highworth Town	2–4	Calne Town

Nursted Road, Devizes
Referee: Daniel Jacecko
13 Mar 12

Shrewton United	3–5	Bemerton Heath Harlequins

Weymouth Street, Warminster
Referee: Mark Niemirski

Final

21 Apr 12
15:00 GMT

Bemerton Heath Harlequins	1–2	Calne Town
Young 39'	Report	Sibbick 1' (pen.); Cox 20'

Hardenhuish Park, Chippenham

=== 2012–13 ===
First round

13 Oct 12

Corsham Town	6–0	Sks Blyskawica

Referee: Nigel Sykes
13 Oct 12

Devizes Town	3–1	Marlborough Town

Elcot Lane Playing Field
Referee: Joshua Ainscow
13 Oct 12

Malmesbury Victoria	1–3	Cricklade Town

Flying Monk Playing Field
Referee: Oliver Ballinger
13 Oct 12

Bradford Town	4–2	Southbrook

Bradford Sports and Social Club
Referee: John Graham
03 Nov 12

Downton	1–0	Purton

Brian Whitehead Sports & Social Club
Referee: Michael Hunter
13 Oct 12

Warminster Town	2–4 (a.e.t.)	Trowbridge Town

Weymouth Street
13 Oct 12

Pewsey Vale	4–0	Ludgershall Sports

Recreation Ground, Pewsey
Referee: Ben Williamson
13 Oct 12

Wroughton	0–1	Amesbury Town

Weirfield
13 Oct 11

Wootton Bassett Town	7–2	New College Swindon

Corinium Stadium, Cirencester
Referee: Paul Humphrey

Second Round

17 Nov 12
15:00 GMT

Corsham Town	12–0	Amesbury Town

Referee: Mark Niemirski
17 Nov 12
15:00 GMT

Bradford Town	1–0	Trowbridge Town

Bradford Sports and Social Club
Referee: Joshua Ainscow
17 Nov 12
15:00 GMT

Pewsey Vale	0–2	Shrewton United

Recreation Ground, Pewsey
Referee: James Welsh
04 Dec 12
15:00 GMT

Devizes Town	1–1 (a.e.t.)	Downton
Penalties
	1–2

Nurstead Road
Referee: Adrian Hunt
17 Nov 12
15:00 GMT

Laverstock & Ford	1–3	Cricklade Town

Church Road
Referee: Nigel Fisher
17 Jan 12
15:00 GMT

Melksham Town	2–1	Highworth Town

The Elms Recreation Griound
Referee: Daniel Jacecko
01 Dec 12
15:00 GMT

Bemerton Heath Harlequins	3–1	Calne Town

Bremhill View, Calne
Referee: Philip Staynings
17 Nov 12
15:00 GMT

Westbury United	3–0	Wootton Bassett Town

Meadow Lane
Referee: Shaun Tobin

Quarter Finals

19 Feb 13
15:00 GMT

Corsham Town	0–2	Downton

Brian Whitehead Sports & Social Club
Referee: Adrian Matthews
26 Feb 13
19:30 GMT

Westbury United	0–3	Bemerton Heath Harlequins

Meadow Lane
Referee: John Bishop
18 Feb 13
19:30 GMT

Melksham Town	Cup Committee Decision Home Win Ineligible Player Fielded	Bradford Town
	Report

The Conigre
Referee: Paul Humphrey
02 Feb 13
15:00 GMT

Shrewton United	2–3 (a.e.t.)	Cricklade Town

Shrewton Rec
Referee: Anthony Welsh

Semi-Finals

12 Mar 13
19:30 GMT

Cricklade Town	2–5	Downton

Nursted Road, Devizes
Referee: James Welsh
13 Mar 12

Bemerton Heath Harlequins	2–2	Melksham Town
	Report
Penalties
	3–4

Weymouth Street, Warminster
Referee: Philip Staynings

Final

20 Apr 13

Melksham Town	2–0 (a.e.t.)	Downton
Griffiths 100'; Barnett 118'	Report

Hardenhuish Park, Chippenham

=== 2013–14 ===
First round

12 Oct 13
15:00 GMT

Warminster Town	1–2	Southbrook
	Report

Referee: Martin Batchelor
12 Oct 13
15:00 GMT

Cricklade Town	w/o away team	Wooton Bassett Town

26 Oct 13
15:00 GMT

Wilts Calne Town	1–5	Pewsey Vale

Referee: Vincent Thomas
12 Oct 13
15:00 GMT

Marlborough Town	0–3	Chippenham Park
	Report

Referee: Simon Campbell
12 Oct 13

Sks Blyskawica	0–3	Trowbridge Town

Referee: Alen Evans
12 Oct 13
15:00 GMT

FC Chippenham Youth	1–5	Mere Town

Referee: David King
12 Oct 13
15:00GMT

Shrewton United	4–3	Laverstock & Ford

Referee: Adrian Hunt
12 Oct 13
15:00 GMT

Highworth Town	8–0	Malmesbury Victoria
Clark; Saunders; Bohane; Horsell; Sproule	Report

12 Oct 13
15:00 GMT

Devizes Town	7–1	Amesbury Town
	Report

Referee: John Bishop
12 Oct 13
15:00 GMT

Calne Town	1–2	Purton

Referee: Samuel Allison
12 Oct 13
15:00 GMT

Bradford Town	8–1	Supermarine Sports Club

Referee: Nigel Fisher
12 Oct 13
15:00 GMT

Wroughton	1–8	Bemerton Heath Harlequins

Referee: Graeme Little
12 Oct 13
15:00 GMT

Downton	w/o home team	Vale of Pewsey

12 Oct 13
15:00 GMT

Westbury United	0–1	Melksham Town
	Report

Referee: Ben Williamson
12 Oct 13
15:00 GMT

Ludgershall Sports	1–2	New College Swindon

Referee: Brian White

Second Round

16 Nov 13
15:00 GMT

Chippenham Park	0–2	Purton
	Report	Fitzgerald 77'; McCrae

16 Nov 13
14:00 GMT

Highworth Town	2–0	Devizes Town
Bennett 40', 47'	Report

Referee: Graham Pearce
16 Nov 13
15:00 GMT

Mere Town	0–2	Corsham Town

Referee: Michael Hunter
16 Nov 13
15:00 GMT

Shrewton United	0–4	Melksham Town
	Report	Kovacs; Stead; Bennett

Referee: Philip Staynings
16 Nov 13
14:00 GMT

Southbrook	0–2	Downton
	Report

Referee: John Bishop
16 Nov 13
14:00 GMT

Trowbridge Town	0–5	Bradford Town
	Report	Evans; Greenland; Hulbert; Jordan; Toogood (o.g.)

Referee: Adrian Hunter
27 Nov 13
19:30 GMT

New College Swindon	1–8	Pewsey Vale
Millar	Report	Hopper; Martin; Bragg; Ritchie

Referee: Roger Smith
7 Dec 13
15:00 GMT

Wootton Bassett Town	2–3	Bemerton Heath Harlequins
	Report

Quarter Finals

18 Jan 14
15:00 GMT

Bradford Town	1 – 0	Pewsey Vale

Referee: Anthony Welsh
18 Jan 14
15:00 GMT

Melksham Town	3 – 2	Highworth Town

Referee: Mark Niemirski
18 Jan 14
15:00 GMT

Downton	1 – 3	Bemerton Heath Harlequins

Referee: John Bishop
18 Jan 14
15:00 GMT

Corsham Town	1 – 2	Purton

Referee: Daniel Lamport

Semi-final

18 Mar 14
19:30 GMT

Purton	0 – 4	Melksham Town
		Higdon 42' (pen.) 70' 86'; Benison 50'

Calne Town F.C.
Referee: Oliver Ballinger
11 Mar 14
19:30 GMT

Bemerton Heath Harlequins	0 – 3	Bradford Town
Jordan; Welch

Referee: Joshua Ainscow

Final

23 Apr 2014
19:30 BST

Melksham Town	3 - 3 (a.e.t.)	Bradford Town
Thomson 47'; Bennett 69'; Kovacs	Report	King 10' 61'; Gilbert 120+'
Penalties
(penalty scored) Kovacs; (penalty scored) Perrott; (penalty scored) Jeffrey	3 - 2	(penalty scored) Fowler; (penalty scored) Jordan; (penalty missed) Evans

Hardenhuish Park, Chippenham
Attendance: 526
Referee: Simon Hooper

=== 2014-15 ===
First round

11 Oct 14
15:00 GMT

Sarum Youth	0 - 2	Mere Town FC

11 Oct 14
15:00 GMT

Bradford Town	w/o	Vale of Pewsey

11 Oct 14
15:00 GMT

Trowbridge Town	3 - 1	Wilts Calne Town

11 Oct 14
15:00 GMT

Ludgershall Sports FC	1 - 2	Chippenham Park

11 Oct 14
15:00 GMT

Laverstock & Ford	4 - 0	Pewsey Vale

11 Oct 14
15:00 GMT

Shrewton United	3 - 2	Devizes Town

11 Oct 14
15:00 GMT

Calne Town	1 - 2	Warminster Town

11 Oct 14
15:00 GMT

Wroughton	2 - 1	Bemerton Heath Harlequins

11 Oct 14
15:00 GMT

Malmesbury Victoria	2 - 3 (a.e.t.)	Royal Wootton Bassett Town

11 Oct 14
15:00 GMT

Southbrook	2 - 0	Trowbridge Wanderers

11 Oct 14
15:00 GMT

Downton	2 - 0	Westbury United

11 Oct 14
15:00 GMT

Marlborough Town	0 - 1	Purton FC

11 Oct 14
15:00 GMT

Corsham Town	2 - 0	Supermarine Sports FC

11 Oct 14
15:00 GMT

Highworth Town	5 - 0	New College Swindon

11 Oct 14
15:00 GMT

Amesbury Town	4 - 1	FC Chippenham Youth

Second Round

8 Nov 14
15:00 GMT

Bradford Town	5 - 1	Mere Town FC

Nov 14
14:00 GMT

Wroughton	0 - 1 (a.e.t.)	Royal Wootton Bassett Town

8 Nov 14
15:00 GMT

Southbrook FC	1 - 5	Warminster Town

15 Nov 14
15:00 GMT

Laverstock & Ford	2 - 0	Marlborough Town

8 Nov 14
15:00 GMT

Corsham Town	2 - 1	Chippenham Park FC

15 Nov 14
15:00 GMT

Amesbury Town	3 - 2	Shrewton United

8 Nov 14
15:00 GMT

Melksham Town	4 - 1	Trowbridge Town

15 Nov 14
15:00 GMT

Downton	0 - 5	Highworth Town

Quarter Finals

20 Dec 14
15:00 GMT

Warminster Town	1 - 2	Amesbury Town FC

13 Dec 14
15:00 GMT

Highworth Town	3 - 2 (a.e.t.)	Melksham Town

13 Dec 14
15:00 GMT

Royal Wootton Bassett Town	0 - 2	Bradford Town

13 Dec 14
15:00 GMT

Laverstock & Ford	2 - 0 (a.e.t.)	Corsham Town

Semi-Finals

18 Feb 15
19:30 GMT

Bradford Town	4 - 2	Laverstock & Ford

Nursted Road, Devizes
Referee: Sam Allison
18 Feb 15
19:30 GMT

Amesbury Town	0 - 4	Highworth Town

Bremhill View, Calne
Referee: Shaun Tobin

Final

29 Apr 15
19:30 GMT

Bradford Town	1 - 2	Highworth Town
Plummer 59'		King 48'; Drewett

Hardenhuish Park, Chippenham
Referee: Lee Probert

=== 2015-16 ===
First round

10 Oct 15
15:00 GMT

Laverstock & Ford	9 - 0	Shrewton United

The Dell, Salisbury, Wiltshire
Referee: Nigel Fisher
10 Oct 15
15:00 GMT

Westbury United	0 - 3	Melksham Town

Meadow Lane, Westbury, Wiltshire
Referee: James Welsh
10 Oct 15
15:00 GMT

Trowbridge Wanderers	1 - 3	Downton

Referee: Sam Read
10 Oct 15
15:00 GMT

Devizes Town	1 - 2 (a.e.t.)	Bemerton Heath Harlequins

Nursted Road, Devizes
Referee: Shaun Tobin
10 Oct 15
15:00 GMT

Sarum Youth	2 - 4	Mere Town

Referee: Sam Gooding
10 Oct 15
15:00 GMT

Marlborough Town	0 - 4	Trowbridge Town

Referee: Sean Rudd
10 Oct 15
15:00 GMT

Royal Wootton Bassett	3 - 1	Ludgershall Sports

Gerard Buxton Sports Ground, Royal Wootton Bassett
Referee: John Graham
10 Oct 15
15:00 GMT

Warminster Town	2 - 3	Amesbury Town

Weymouth St, Warminster
Referee: Benjamin Williamson
10 Oct 15
15:00 GMT

Calne Town	0 - 2	Pewsey Vale

Bremhill View, Calne
Referee: Brian White
10 Oct 15
15:00 GMT

Calne Town	1 - 0	Purton

Southbank, Corsham
Referee: Andrew Evans
17 Oct 15
15:00 GMT

Chippenham Park	w/o	Malmesbury Victoria

10 Oct 15
15:00 GMT

Wroughton	1 - 6	Salisbury

The Elms Recreation Ground, Highworth
Referee: Roger Smith
14 Sep 15
15:00 GMT

New College Swindon	2 - 1	Wilts Calne Town

Supermarine RFC Sports & Social, Swindon

Second Round

7 Nov 15
15:00 GMT

Downton	0 - 2	Trowbridge Town

The Brian Whitehead Sports Ground, Downton
Referee: Brian White
7 Nov 15
14:00 GMT

Melksham Town	3 - 1	Bradford Town

The Conigre, Melksham
Referee: Philip Staynings
21 Nov 15
15:00 GMT

Chippenham Park	2 - 3 (a.e.t.)	Bemerton Heath Harlequins

Hardenhuish Park, Chippenham

BYE	v	Highworth Town

7 Nov 15
15:00 GMT

Royal Woottton Bassett	4 - 0	New College Swindon

Gerard Buxton Sports Ground, Royal Wootton Bassett
Referee: Andrew Evans
7 Nov 15
15:00 GMT

Laverstock & Ford	4 - 0	Amesbury Town

The Dell, Salisbury
Referee: Nigel Sykes
7 Nov 15
15:00 GMT

Salisbury	7 - 0	Mere Town

The Raymond McEnhill Stadium, Salisbury
Referee: Shaun Tobin
14 Nov 15
15:00 GMT

Pewsey Vale	0 - 4	Corsham Town

Referee: Benjamin Williamson

Quarter Finals

19 Dec 15
15:00 GMT

Salisbury FC	6 - 1	Laverstock & Ford

Attendance: The Raymond McEnhill Stadium, Salisbury
Referee: Oliver Ballinger
19 Dec 15
15:00 GMT

Trowbridge Town	1 - 2	Bemerton Heath Harlequins

Attendance: Woodmarsh, Trowbridge
Referee: Adrian Matthews
19 Dec 15
15:00 GMT

Royal Wootton Bassett Town	0 - 1	Melksham Town
		Higdon 80'

Gerard Buxton Sports Ground, Royal Wootton Bassett
Referee: James Welsh
19 Dec 15
15:00 GMT

Highworth Town	1 - 2	Corsham Town
Clark 87'		Gleed 35'; Cox 85'

The Elms Recreation Ground, Highworth
Referee: Roger Smith

Semi-finals

17 Feb 16
19:30 GMT

Salisbury FC	6 - 2	Corsham Town
(Matthews) (White) (White) (White) (Walker)		(Bryan) (Gleed)

The Raymond McEnhill Stadium, Salisbury
Attendance: 350
Referee: Daniel Lamport
2 Mar 16
19:30 GMT

Bemerton Heath Harlequins	1 - 5	Melksham Town
		(Stradling) (Hulbert) (Hulbert) (Thomson) (Thomson)

Westwood Recreation Ground/Moon Park, Salisbury
Referee: Phil Staynings

Final

27 Apr 2016
19:45 BST

Salisbury City	0-2	Melksham Town
		Stradling 68'; Higdon 73'

Hardenhuish Park, Chippenham
Attendance: 736
Referee: S.Allison

=== 2016-17 ===
First round

11 Oct 16
19:45 GMT

Chippenham Town	5 - 0	Wroughton
While 2' (o.g.); Pratt 5'; Griffin 24'; Sandell 79'; Guthrie 87'

Hardenhuish Park, Chippenham, Wiltshire
Attendance: 124
Referee: Graham Pearce
11 Oct 16
19:45 GMT

Westbury United	1 - 0	Wilts Calne Town
Scammell 53'

Meadow Lane, Westbury, Wiltshire
Referee: Roger Smith
11 Oct 16
19:45 GMT

Pewsey Vale	0 - 8	Salisbury

Referee: Benjamin Williamson
8 Oct 16
15:00 GMT

Ludgershall Sports	3 - 2	Warminster Town

Referee: Shane Mansfield
11 Oct 16
19:45 GMT

Amesbury Town	3 - 1	Chippenham Park

Referee: Andrew Evans
11 Oct 16
19:45 GMT

Laverstock & Ford	3 - 0	Marlborough Town

Referee: Sam Gooding
12 Oct 16
19:45 GMT

Highworth Town	walkover	Shrewton United

Referee: Nigel Fisher
11 Oct 16
19:45 GMT

Downton	6 - 0	New College Swindon

Referee: Oliver Ballinger
12 Oct 16
19:30 GMT

Bradford Town	2 - 1	Mere Town
Lenihan 36'; Cottle 80'		Goal

Referee: Adrian Matthews
12 Oct 16
19:45 GMT

Royal Wootton Bassett Town	3 - 2	Purton

Referee: James Welsh
12 Oct 16
19:45 GMT

Calne Town	1 - 0	Bromham

8 Oct 16
15:00 GMT

Trowbridge Town	3 - 5	Beversbrook

Referee: Kristian Guyatt
11 Sep 16
19:45 GMT

Swindon Supermarine	8 - 0	Malmesbury Victoria

Supermarine RFC Sports & Social, Swindon
Referee: Matthew Rushton
8 Oct 16
15:00 GMT

Cricklade Town	1 - 4	Bemerton Heath Harlequins

Referee: Brian White
12 Oct 16
19:45 GMT

Corsham Town	1 - 2	Devizes Town

Referee: Shaun Tobin

Second Round

15 Nov 16
19:45 GMT

Downton	3 - 1	Devizes Town

Referee: Nigel Fisher
15 Nov 16
19:30 GMT

Westbury United	0 - 2	Highworth Town
		Gleed 57'; Stanners 68'

Referee: Connor Malone
29 Nov 16
19:45 GMT

Laverstock & Ford	4 - 1	Melksham Town

Referee: James Welsh
22 Nov 16
19:45 GMT

Salisbury	3 - 2	Bemerton Heath Harlequins
Walker 20'; Bennett 30'; Mundy 82'		Joyce 50'; Slade 81'

Attendance: 352
Referee: Philip Staynings
16 Nov 16
19:30 GMT

Calne Town	2 - 0	Beversbrook Town

Referee: Sam Read
15 Nov 16
19:45 GMT

Swindon Supermarine	2 - 1	Chippenham Town

Referee: Daniel Lamport
12 Nov 16
14:00 GMT

Ludgershall Sports	0 - 3	Amesbury Town

Referee: Paul March
7 Dec 16
19:30 GMT

Bradford Town	2 - 0	Royal Wootton Bassett Town
Cottle 21'; Wall 65'

Bradford on Avon Sports and Social Club, Bradford on Avon
Attendance: 49
Referee: Adrian Matthews

Quarter-finals

13 Dec 2016
19:45 GMT

Swindon Supermarine	6 - 1	Downton
Hooper 13' (pen.), 65'; Parsons 34', 50', 55'; Waldon 51'		(Bentall), 45'

Attendance: 76
Referee: Graham Pearce
13 Dec 2016
19:45 GMT

Salisbury FC	2 - 1	Amesbury Town
Whelan 34'; Bennett		Brockway 6'

Attendance: 306
Referee: Daniel Lamport
14 Dec 2016
19:30 GMT

Calne Town	1 - 0	Laverstock & Ford
Windsor 1'

Referee: Oliver Ballinger
14 Dec 2016
19:45 GMT

Highworth Town	2 - 0	Bradford Town
McCarthy 21'; Gleed 35'

Attendance: 64
Referee: Andrew Evans

Semi-finals

8 Mar 2017
19:45 GMT

Calne Town	0 - 4	Swindon Supermarine
		Waldon; Parsons J 22'; Parsons C 87'

Hardenhuish Park, Chippenham
Referee: Iain Parsons
21 Mar 2017
19:45 GMT

Highworth Town	4 - 3	Salisbury FC
Gleed 59'; Davoile 65'; Edenborough 84'; Hall-Cousins 86'		Brown 75' (o.g.); Wright 44', 35'

Oakfield Stadium, Melksham
Attendance: 262
Referee: Matthew Rushton

Final

27 April 2017

Highworth Town	1 - 2	Swindon Supermarine
Edenborough 16'		Parsons 22'; Taylor 50'

County Ground, Swindon
Attendance: 518
Referee: Phil Staynings

=== 2017-18 ===
First round

14 Oct 17
15:00 BST

Purton	1 - 2	Amesbury Town
Avery 35'		Greenway 65'; Sherfield 90'

The Red House, Purton
Referee: Paul March
16 Oct 17
19:45 BST

Melksham Town	5 - 0	Mere Town

The Oakfield Stadium, Melksham
Referee: Shaun Tobin
23 Oct 17
19:45 BST

New College Swindon	0 - 5	Chippenham Park

New College Drive, Swindon
Referee: Sam Gooding
17 Oct 17
19:45 BST

Bemerton Heath Harlequins	8 - 2	Warminster Town

Western Way, Salisbury
Referee: Shane Mansfield
17 Oct 17
19:45 BST

Calne Town	2 - 0	Malmesbury Victoria
Chevolleau 11'; Winsdor 72'

Bremhill View, Calne
Referee: Brian White
17 Oct 17
19:45 BST

Devizes Town	1 - 3 (a.e.t.)	Bremhill

Nursted Road, Devizes
Referee: Adam Gregory
17 Oct 17
19:45 BST

Downton	1 - 2	Highworth Town
Four 47'		McGhee-Parsons 79', 86' (pen.)

The Brian Whitehead Sports Ground, Downton
Attendance: 27
Referee: Adam Osborne
17 Oct 17
19:45 BST

Laverstock & Ford	4 - 3	Wroughton

The Dell, Salisbury
Referee: Connor Malone
17 Oct 17
19:45 BST

Bassett Bulldogs	0 - 13	Salisbury FC
		Green (4); Herbert(3); Perrett(3); Brockway; Benson (o.g.)

The Raymond McEnhill Stadium, Salisbury
Attendance: 204
Referee: Roger Smith
17 Oct 17
19:45 BST

Swindon Supermarine	Home Walkover	Ludgershall Sports

Webb's Wood Stadium, South Marston, Swindon
Referee: James Welsh
18 Oct 17
19:45 BST

Pewsey Vale	5 - 0	Corsham Town

The Recreation Ground, Pewsey
Referee: Mitchell Terry
18 Oct 17
19:45 BST

Royal Wootton Bassett Town	4 - 1	Cricklade Town
Collier 8'; Corcoran; Wrona; Maximen 82'		Bryan

New Gerard Buxton Sports Ground, Brinkworth Road, Royal Wootton Bassett,
Referee: Samuel Read
18 Oct 17
19:45 BST

Shrewton United	0 - 7	Chippenham Town
		Ricketts 14', 80'; Richards 27', 48'; Smile 46', 52', 85'

The Recreation Ground, Shrewton
Attendance: 150
Referee: Graham Pearce
18 Oct 17
19:45 BST

Westbury United	4 - 0	Marlborough Town
Hulbert 11'; Ferguson 45'; Robinson 68'; Hiscocks 86'

Meadow Lane, Westbury
Referee: Steven Benchley

Second Round

14 Nov 17
19:45 GMT

Chippenham Town	2 - 1	Melksham Town
Sandell 22'; Twine 50'		Stradling 90'

Hardenhuish Park. Chippenham
Attendance: 253
Referee: Daniel Lamport
15 Nov 17
19:30 GMT

Westbury United	3 - 2 (a.e.t.)	Bradford Town

Meadow Lane, Westbury
Referee: Benjamin Williamson
21 Nov 17
19:45 GMT

Bremhill	2 - 1	Amesbury Town
Whitmore 64'; Rutty 90+3'		Stephens 3'

Referee: James Welsh
14 Nov 17
19:45 GMT

Calne Town	0 - 3	Bemerton Heath Harlequins
		Rawkins 7' (pen.); Davis 13'

Bremhill View, Calne
Referee: Shaun Tobin
15 Nov 17
19:45 GMT

Highworth Town	Home w/o	Laverstock & Ford

The Elms Recreation Ground, Highworth
Referee: Graham Pearce
22 Nov 17
19:45 GMT

Royal Wootton Bassett Town	4 - 0	Trowbridge Town
Waldon 12'; Yeardley (pen.); Sproule 75'

New Gerard Buxton Sports Ground, Brinkworth Road, Royal Wootton Bassett,
Referee: Martin Batchelor
21 Nov 17
19:45 GMT

Chippenham Park	4 - 1	Pewsey Vale

Hardenhuish Park, Bristol Road, Chippenham
Referee: Kristian Guyatt
14 Nov 17
19:45 GMT

Salisbury FC	3 - 1	Swindon Supermarine
Kotwicka 13', 32', 62'		Parsons 7'

The Raymond McEnhill Stadium, Salisbury
Attendance: 292
Referee: Matthew Rushton

Quarter-finals

13 Dec 2017
19:45 GMT

Royal Wootton Bassett Town	2 - 5	Highworth Town
Wrona 5'; Waldon 18'		McGhee-Parsons 7', 28', 51', 81', 84'

New Gerard Buxton Sports Ground, Brinkworth Road, Royal Wootton Bassett
Referee: Graham Pearce
13 Dec 2017
19:45 GMT

Chippenham Town	3 - 1	Chippenham Park
Ferguson 45' 81'; Sandell 62'		Norman 20'

Hardenhuish Park, Bristol Road, Chippenham
Attendance: 205
Referee: Andrew Evans
19 Dec 2017
19:45 GMT

Bremhill	0 - 3	Bemerton Heath Harlequins
		Rawkins

Referee: Samuel Read
20 Dec 2017
19:45 GMT

Westbury United	0 - 1	Salisbury FC
		Jordan 22' (o.g.)

Meadow Lane, Westbury
Attendance: 216
Referee: Philip Staynings

Semi-finals

13 March 2018
19:45 GMT

Chippenham Town	8 - 0	Bemerton Heath Harlequins
Beeden 7', 60'; Jones 30'; Smile 56', 76'; Patten 82'; McCootie 83'

The Oakfield Stadium, Melksham
Attendance: 169
Referee: Andrew Evans
20 March 2018
19:45 GMT

Salisbury FC	1 - 2	Highworth Town
O'Keefe 1'		Edenborough 11' (pen.); Waldon 20'

The Raymond McEnhill (Ray Mac) Stadium, Salisbury
Attendance: 164
Referee: Philip Staynings

Final

9 May 18
19:45 BST

Chippenham Town	3 - 0	Highworth Town
Richards 35'; Guthrie 55'; Ferguson 58'

The County Ground, Swindon
Attendance: 440
Referee: Daniel Lamport

=== 2018-19 ===
First Round

13 Oct 2018
15:00 BST

Football ID	w/o(away)	Marlbororugh Town

Referee: Steve Brenchley
16 Oct 2018
19:45 BST

Royal Wootton Bassett Town	2 - 3	Westbury United
James; Stanley		Demkiv; Jordan; Stradling

Referee: Graham Pearce
16 Oct 2018
19:45 BST

Downton	1 - 2	Laverstock & Ford

Referee: Brain White
13 Oct 2018
15:00 BST

Ludgershall Sports	0 - 6	Cricklade Town
		Bryan; Coleman; Corp; Reece

Referee: Rory Peacey
16 Oct 2018
19:45 BST

Chippenham Park	0 - 2	Highworth Town
		Grabe 30'; Toumani 89'

Attendance: 47
Referee: Shane Mansfield
15 Oct 2018
19:45 BST

New College Swindon	0 - 10	Melksham Town

Referee: Samuel Read
16 Oct 2018
19:45 BST

Calne Town	1 - 0	Pewsey Vale

Referee: Martin Ealey
23 Oct 2018
19:45 BST

Malmesbury Victoria	3 - 2	Amesbury Town

Referee: Said Ouchene
13 Oct 2018
15:00 BST

Purton	1 - 0	Bemerton Heath Harlequins
Regis

Referee: Samuel Hunt
17 Oct 2018
19:30 BST

Wroughton	1 - 4	Devizes Town

Referee: Adam Gregory
17 Oct 2018
19:45 BST

Corsham Town	1 - 3	Bradford Town

Referee: James Welsh
17 Oct 2018
19:45 BST

Warminster Town	0 - 3	Shrewton United

Referee: Shaun Tobin

Second Round

14 Nov 2018
19:30 GMT

Bradford Town	1 - 1	Salisbury FC
Penalties
	1 - 3

Referee: Roger Smith
20 Nov 2018
19:45 GMT

Laverstock & Ford	5 - 1	Malmesbury Victoria

Referee: Daniel Spyer
09 Nov 2018
19:45 GMT

Westbury United	4 - 2	Shrewton United
Kovacs 22' (pen.); Demkiv 23'; Jordan 69'		Jackson 57'; Baldy (o.g.)

Referee: Mitchell Terry
14 Nov 2018
19:45 GMT

Highworth Town	1 - 2	Swindon Supermarine
Sidibi 48'		McDonagh 78'; Fleetwood 79'

Referee: Daniel Lamport
10 Nov 2018
14:00 GMT

Purton FC	4 - 2	Marlborough Town

Referee: Nigel Fisher
10 Nov 2018
13:45 GMT

Trowbridge Town	0 - 1	Cricklade Town

Referee: Timothy Eagles
13 Nov 2018
19:45 GMT

Calne Town	0 - 2	Chippenham Town
		Ferguson 50'; Felix 51'

Referee: James Welsh
13 Nov 2018
19:45 GMT

Devizes Town	0 - 1	Melksham Town

Referee: Iain Parsons

Quarter-finals

11 Dec 2018
19:45 GMT

Salisbury FC	1 - 0	Chippenham Town
Young 52'

Attendance: 193
Referee: Philip Staynings
12 Dec 2018
19:45 GMT

Westbury United	7 - 0	Purton FC
Kovacs 11' (pen.), 39', 77'; Stradling 74', 81'; Hulber 65', 87'

Referee: Samuel Read
8 Dec 2018
12:00 GMT

Cricklade Town	1 - 2	Laverstock & Ford
		Lovegrove; Sykes

Referee: Adam Gregory
11 Dec 2018
19:45 GMT

Swindon Supermarine	4 - 1	Melksahm Town
Hopkins 3', 36'; Fleetwood 60'; McDonagh 70'		Plummer 11'

Attendance: 101
Referee: Andrew Evans

Semi-finals

12 Feb 2019
19:45 GMT

Salisbury FC	6 - 0	Laverstock & Ford
Hopper 6', 33'; Benson 50'; Fitchett 57', 76'; Herbert 60'

Referee: Daniel Lamport
13 Feb 2019
19:45 GMT

Westbury United	1 - 4 (a.e.t.)	Swindon Supermarine
Ferguson 1'		Hooper 89' (pen.); Parsons 92', 119'; McDonagh 108'

Attendance: 164
Referee: Shane Manasfield

Final

17 Apr 2019
19:45 BST

Swindon Supermarine	3 - 1	Salisbury FC
Spalding 36'; Williams 48'; Fleetwood 90'		Shepherd 85' (o.g.)

Oakfield Stadium, Melksham
Attendance: 350
Referee: Andrew Evans

=== 2019-20 ===
The following teams received a first round bye.

Bemerton Heath Harlequins
Calne Town
Corsham Town
Cricklade Town

Downton
Laverstock & Ford
Ludgershall Sports FC
Malmesbury Victoria

New College Swindon
Stratton Juniors
Trowbridge Town
Warminster Town
Wroughton

First round

8 Oct 2019
19:30 BST

Shrewton United	4 - 2 (a.e.t.)	Pewsey Vale
Croggy; Smith D Watson; Mcnally

Shrewton Recreation Ground, Shrewton
Referee: Matthew Sell
15 Oct 2109
19:45 BST

Holt FC	3 - 2	Marlborough Town
Edwards; Robinson; Gunning

Meadow Lane, Westbury
Referee: George Lynch
22 Oct 2019
19:30 BST

Devizes Town	1 - 0	Purton FC
Bradley 12'

Nursteed Road, Devizes
Referee: Adrian Berry

Second round

16 Nov 2019
13:30 GMT

Stratton Juniors	0 - 2	Wroughton

Referee: William Hawkins
12 Nov 2019
19:45 GMT

Laverstock & Ford	6 - 0	New College Swindon
Jones; McSorley; Dawes (o.g.); Lovegrove (o.g.)

Referee: Nigel Sykes
16 Nov 2019
13:30 GMT

Cricklade Town	4 - 0	Calne Town

Referee: Christopher Harris
16 Nov 2019
13:30 GMT

Shrewton United	0 - 3	Corsham Town
		Rogers 6' ? (o.g.); Rogers 81'

Referee: Steven Annetts
12 Nov 2019
19:45 GMT

Holt FC	1 - 3	Malmesbury Victoria
Bole

Referee: George Lynch
16 Nov 2019
13:30 GMT

Trowbridge Town	2- 1	Devizes Town
Dixon; Sainsbury		Russell

Referee: George Lynch
12 Nov 2019
19:45 GMT

Bemerton Heath Harlequins	19 - 0	Ludgershall Sports FC

Referee: Kevan Dean
12 Nov 2019
19:45 GMT

Downton	3 - 2	Warminster Town
Dance; Razak; Savage		Allan; Graham

Referee: Andrew Lincoln

Quarter-finals

4 Jan 2020
13:30 GMT

Trowbridge Town	1 - 1 (a.e.t.)	Calne Town
Taylor 67'		Chevelleau 32' (pen.)
Penalties
Penalty missed Penalty scored	3 - 4	Windsor (penalty scored); Witchell (penalty scored); Hudson (penalty scored); Talmash (penalty scored)

Referee: Bruce Harris
11 Dec 2019
19:45 GMT

Corsham Town	3 - 1	Downton
McCarron 5'; Alchin 26'; Curtis 80'		Owen 23'

Referee: Adrian Berry
7 Jan 2020
19:45 GMT

Wroughton	3 - 1	Laverstock & Ford
Hibbert; Maximen		Campbell-Smith

Referee: Patrick Butler
17 Dec 2019
19:45 GMT

Bemerton Heath Harlequins	5 - 2 (a.e.t.)	Malmesbury Victoria
Hallahan 55' (pen.); Hoey; Perrett (o.g.)		90' (pen.)

Referee: Gary Ridley

Semi-finals

3 Mar 2020
19:45 GMT

Corsham Town	2 - 3	Bemerton Heath Harlequins
Chandler; Pring 18'		Bennett 65', 85'; Matthews 77'

Referee: Mitchell Terry
11 Mar 2020
19:45 GMT

Calne Town	5 - 1 (a.e.t.)	Wroughton
Jamal; Windsor (pen.); McGrory; McStravick (pen.)

Referee: Adam Gregory

Final

TBC
TBC

Bemerton Heath Harlequins	-	Calne Town

Referee: Adam Gregory

COMPETITION SUSPENDED due to the COVID-19 pandemic. The final was never played even when restrictions were partially lifted.

=== 2020-21 ===
First round

4 Nov 20
19:45 GMT

Warminster Town	-	Ludgershall Sports

Referee: John Reed

Second round

16 Jan 21
13:30 GMT

Purton	-	Pewsey Vale

16 Jan 21
13:30 GMT

Corsham Town	–	Bemerton Heath Harlequins

16 Jan 21
13:30 GMT

Cricklade Town	-	Marlborough Town

16 Jan 21
13:30 GMT

Malmesbury Victoria	-	Stratton Juniors

16 Jan 21
13:30 GMT

Shrewton United	-	Warminster Town

16 Jan 21
13:30 GMT

Devizes Town	-	Laverstock & Ford

16 Jan 21
13:30 GMT

Downton	-	Trowbridge Town

16 Jan 21
13:30 GMT

Wroughton	-	Calne Town

The first and second round draw was made as above, but the competition was suspended and then cancelled due to imposition of restrictions due to the ongoing COVID-19 pandemic.

=== 2021-22 ===
First round

11 Sep 21
15:00 BST

Marlborough Town	10–0	Purton FC

Referee: Jordan Cuthbertson
14 Sep 21
19:45 BST

Pewsey Vale	1–3	Malmesbury Victoria
Guthrie

Referee: Ella Broad
14 Sep 21
19:45 BST

Bemerton Heath Harlequins	4–0	Shrewton United
Clancy 5'; Sweeney 15'; Moore 35', 70'

Referee: John Reed
14 Sep 21
19:45 BST

Devizes Town	w/o Home win	Ludgershall Sports

14 Sep 21
19:45 BST

Calne Town	Tie not played	Corsham Town

18 Sep 21
15:00 BST

Trowbridge Town	2–0	Warminster Town
Baggs 23' (pen.); Gullis 34'

Referee: Nigel Sykes
18 Sep 21
15:00 BST

Stratton Juniors	1–4	Wroughton

Referee: Jordan Cuthbertson
21 Sep 21
19:45 BST

Downton	2–2	Laverstock & Ford
Moseley (pen.)		Jones; Jackson
Penalties
Ovingtom; Moseley; Dible; Wilkins	4–3	Bourner; Ward; Fletcher

Referee: Adrian Berry

Quarter finals

N/A
N/A

Marlborough Town	Bye

9 Nov 21
19:45 GMT

Bemerton Heath Harlequins	4–2	Trowbridge Town
Bennett 15', 55', 75'; Burden 30'		Robinson 40'; Baker 60'

Referee: Lloyd Kettlety
9 Nov 21
19:45 GMT

Malmesbury Victoria	1–0	Wroughton

Referee: Luke Hinchcliffe
16 Nov 21
19:45 GMT

Downton	6–0	Devizes Town
Smith. J 20', 63'; Howe 38', 64', 70'; Clarke 45+2'

Attendance: 117
Referee: John Reed

Semi finals

1 Mar 22
19:45 GMT

Bemerton Heath Harlequins	8-0	Marlborough Town
Bennett 8', 34'; Beckley 15', 40', 69'; Roach 38'; Trigwell 85'; Clancy 89'

Gerard Buxton Sports Ground, Royal Wootton Bassett
Referee: Jordan Cutherbertson
8 Mar 22
19:45 GMT

Malmesbury Victoria	0–1	Downton
		Howe 70' (pen.)

Oakfield Stadium, Melksham
Attendance: 50
Referee: Steven Brenchley

Final

15 Mar 22 GMT
19:45

Downton	2–0	Bemerton Heath Harlequins
Davies 24'; Howe 65'

Oakfield Stadium, Melksham
Referee: Luke Hinchcliffe

=== 2022-23 ===
First Round

Amesbury Town received a first round bye

1 Oct 22
1500 BST

Devizes Town	Home win – walkover	Stratton Juniors

Referee: Adam Bewley
8 Oct 22
13:30 BST

Wroughton	4–0	Blunsdon FC

Weir Field, Wroughton
Referee: Mark Niemirski
11 Oct 22
19:30 BST

Calne Town	2–0	Trowbridge Town
Norman 25'; Bright 88'

Referee: Roger Smith
11 Oct 22
19:30 BST

Warminster Town	Home win – walkover

11 Oct 22
19:45 BST

Malmesbury Victoria	5–2	Marlborough Town

Referee: Shaun Mccombie
11 Oct 22
19:30 BST

Downton	Home win – walkover	Bemerton Heath Harlequins

29 Oct 22
14:00 BST

Pewsey Vale	Home win – walkover	Shrewton United

Quarter-finals

5 Nov 22
14:00 UTC

Wroughton	3–0	Pewsey Vale

Weir Field, Wroughton
Referee: Adam Bewley
8 Nov 22
19:45 UTC

Downton	5–1	Devizes Town

Brian Whithead Sports & Social Club, Downton
Referee: Robert Herret
9 Nov 22
19:45 UTC

Warminster Town	3–1	Malmesbury Victoria

Referee: John Reed
15 Nov 22
19:45 UTC

Amesbury Town	1–0	Calne Town

Bonnymead Park, Amesbury
Referee: Timothy Bunt

Semi-finals

14 Mar 23
19:45 UTC

Warminster Town	0–0	Wroughton
Penalties
	2–4

Referee: Jordan Cuthbertson
14 Mar 23
19:45 UTC

Amesbury Town	0–3	Downton
		Howe; Davies

Attendance: 120
Referee: Lloyd Kettlety

Final

28 Mar 23
19:45 BST

Wroughton	2–6	Downton
Peachy-Score 28'; Harman 76'		Howe 40'; Krysztofowicz 45', 60'; Laptas 63'; Butler 82'; Davies 89'

Meadow Lane, Westbury, Wiltshire
Referee: Luke Hinchcliffe

=== 2023-24 ===
First Round

12 Sep 23
19:45 BST

Royal Wootton Bassett Town Development	1–2	Blunsdon
Larty		Young

Gerard Buxton Sports Ground, Royal Wootton Bassett
Referee: Brian Bennett-Murdoch

Second Round

10 Oct 23
19:45 BST

Downnton	2–0	Shrewton United
Smith, Joe 7', 20'

Brian Whitehead Sports & Social Club, Wick Lane, Downton
Attendance: 100
Referee: Lloyd Kettlety
10 Oct 23
19:45 BST

Malmesbury Victoria	5–1	Warminster Town
Gudge 35'; Evatt 40'; Baker 61'; Smith 65'; Sinclair 86'		36'

Referee: Robert Herrett
10 Oct 23
19:45 BST

Melksham Town	1–1	Blunsdon
Penalties
	4−1

Referee: Alex Matthews
10 Oct 23
19:30 BST

Bradford Town	3–1	Kingsdown
Jordan (6}), 45'; Witcombe 88'		Fenton 86'

Attendance: 71
Referee: Roger Smith
10 Oct 23
19:45 BST

Pewsey Vale	1–4	Calne Town

Referee: Jamie Rhodes
10 Oct 23
19:45 BST

Salisbury Development	0–5	Devizes Town
		Gleed; Moffatt; Walters; Swain

Referee: Stephen Southam
10 Oct 23
19:45 BST

Amesbury Town	5–1	Ludgershall Sports
Jackson; Vallis; Morris (o.g.)		Holden

Referee: Jordan Cutherbertson
14 Oct 23
14:00 BST

Trowbridge Town	3–2	Wroughton
Millard 9'; Samuel 17'; Shipman 80'		22'; 71'

Referee: Dominic Mortimer

Quarter Finals

21 Nov 23
19:30 BST

Bradford Town	1–1	Malmesbury Victoria
Jordan		Goal
Penalties
	3–2

Referee: Ella Broad
21 Nov 23
19:45 BST

Calne Town	2–6	Amesbury Town
Smith; Bright		Vallis; Morris; Moore; McCracken; Owen

Referee: Luke Hinchliffe
14 Nov 23
19:45 BST

Donwton	6–1	Devizes Town
Davies 28'; Smith 30', 43', 60'; Mason 86'; Clark 90'		Goal

Brian Whitehead Sports & Social Club, Downton
Attendance: 149
Referee: Robert Herrett
22 Nov 23
19:45 BST

Melksham Town	4–2	Trowbridge Town
Woods; Pearce; Dodge		14' (o.g.); Bendle 84'

Oakfield Stadium, Melksham
Referee: Alex Matthews

Semi-finals

19 Mar 24
19:45 UTC

Downton	1–2	Bradford Town
Griffiths 54'		Jordan S. 20'; Witcombe 30'

Attendance: 88
Referee: Jordan Cuthbertson
12 Mar 24
19:45 UTC

Amesbury Town	5–1	Melksham Rovers
Moore J 37' 72'; Moore A McCracken 47'		79'

Bonnymead Park
Referee: Shaun Smith

Final

10 Apr 24
19:45 BST

Downton FC	1–1	Amesbury Town
Prentice 68'		McCracken 70'
Penalties
	4–1

The Clubhouse, Bemerton Heath, Salisbury
Referee: Robert Herrett

=== 2024-25 ===
First Round

10 Sep 24
19:45 BST

Devizes Town	3–1	Salisbury FC Development
Baker 43'; Bowyer 59'		Naman Gurung

Referee: Duncan Clarke

All other entrants received a bye

Second Round

15 Oct 24
19:45 BST

Melksham Town	3–1	Pewsey Vale
Ballinger (pen.); Rendell

Referee: Thomas Evans
8 Oct 24
19:45 NST

Devizes Town	1–0	Bradford Town
Gleed

Referee: TBD
9 Oct 24
19:45 BST

Shrewton United	0–4	Warminster Town
		Corey 45', 80'; Ryan 56'; Jack 78'

Referee: Zach Muslin
8 Oct 24
19:45 BST

Royal Wootton Bassettt Twon Dev	4–0	Bemerton Heath Harlequins Res
Mesa; Head; Walters; Warren

Referee: Andrew Desroches
8 Oct 24
19:45 BST

Calne Town	9–1	Blunsdon
Pike-Bright; Brand; Costello; McGrory; Stewart

Referee: Rhiannon Stevens
12 Oct 24
14:00 BST

Trowbridge Town	2–0	Kingsdown
Maddison 15'; Cox 18'

Referee: Anthony Brewerton
16 Oct 24
19:45 BST

Park United	5–0	Malmesbury Victoria Dev
Adam; McCarron; Moss; Pring; Selman

Staney Park Sports Ground, Chippenham
Referee: Alex Matthews
19 Oct 24
19:45 BST

Amesbury Town	3–3	Wroughton
Langdown; Harvey; Morris		Peachy-Score; Teshome
Penalties
	4–5

Referee: James Biddlecombe

Quarter-finals

13 Nov 24
19:45 UTC

Warminster Town	5 – 3	Park United

Referee: Andrew Desroches
12 Nov 24
19:45 UTC

Devizes Town	4–2	Melksham Town
Rogers; Sminner; Talmash; Parsons

Referee: Zach Muslin
16 Nov 24
13:30 UTC

Wroughton	3 –1	Trowbridge Town

Referee: Graham Colwill
12 Nov 24
19:45 UTC

Royal Wootton Basset Town Dev	2–1	Calne Town
Withers; Walters		Francis

Referee: Andrew Lewis

Semi-finals

11 Mar 25
19:45 UTC

Warminster Town	1–3	Devizes Town
MacFarlane		Hopper; Thomson; Walters
Penalties
	–

Hardenhuish Park, Chippenham
Referee: Lloyd Kettlety
18 Mar 25
19:45 UTC

Wroughton	0–0	Royal Wootton Bassett Town Dev
Penalties
	3–0

Swindon Supermarine FC
Referee: Anthony Brewerton

Final

2 Apr 25
19:45 BST

Wroughton	0–3	Devizes Town
		Hopper 32', 60'; Bazley 67'

Hardenhuish Park, Chippenahm

=== 2025/26 ===
First Round

25 Aug 25
19:45 BST

Warminster Town	w/o	Calne Town Res

Second Round

4 Oct 25
14:00 BST

Wroughton	2–2	Trowbridge Town
Penalties
	5–3

Referee: Graham Hill
4 Oct 25
14:00 BST

Shrewton united	1–1	Pewsey Vale
Cross 73'		16'
Penalties
	3–4

7 Oct 25
19:45 BST

Calne Town	5–2	Cricklade Town
Culley (o.g.); Collis (o.g.); Patey		Goal

Referee: Teoni Dark
7 Oct 25
19:45 BST

Malmesbury Victoria	5–2	Purton Kingssdown
Muhid 11'; Shaw 14'; Jackson 29'; Parsons 56', 62'		4'; 39'

7 Oct 25
19:45 BST

Bemerton Heath Harlequins	0–2	Warminster Town
		Pinder 15'; Duck 84'

Referee: Zachary Muslin
7 Oct 25
19:45 BST

Devizes Town	3–3	Amesbury Town
Penalties
	5–4

Referee: Adam Bewley
7 Oct 25
19:45 BST

Park United	3–1	Swindon Supermarine

Referee: Jason Cuthbert
8 Oct 25
19:45 BST

Melksham Town	1–3	Royal Wootton Basset Dev
Farrell		Nyongolo; Pettifer; King (pen.)

Referee: Joshua Ainscow

Quarter finals

6 Dec 25
14:00 UTC

Pewsey Vale	w/o Home win	Wroughton

15 Dec 25
19:45 UTC

Park United	0–3	Malmesbury Victoria
		Evatt 25'; Chilcott 36'; Goodey 83'

Referee: Teoni Dark
9 Dec 25
18:45 UTC

Royal Wootton Bassett Dev	1–3	Warminster Town

16 Dec 25
19:45 UTC

Calne Town	1–2	Devizes Town

Referee: Joshua Ainscow

Semi finals

17 Feb 26
19:45 UTC

Warminster Town	1–0	Pewsey Vale
Tyson 42'

Referee: Graham Hall
24 Feb 26
19:45 UTC

Devizes town	3–0	Malmesbury Victoria
Buck; Reader

Final

14 Apr 26
19:45 BST

Warminster Town	2–1	Devizes Town
Gardner 34'; Vincent 60'		Henshall 78'

Hardenhuish Park, Chippenham
Attendance: 412
Referee: Phil Staynings

=== 2026/27 ===
Source:Wiltshire FA Official website – Senior Cup 2026/27

First Round

6 Oct 26
19:45 BST

Shrewton United	5–0	Trowbridge Town
Utterson 36', 83'; Bennett 45', 78'; Moore 55'

Recreation Ground, Shrewton
Referee: Peter Darby

Second Round

3 Nov 26
19:45 UTC

Park United	3–3	Devizes Town Res
Penalties
	3–4

The SECURE Stadium, Corsham
Referee: Andrew lewis
2 Nov 26
19:45 UTC

Mere Town	w/o Home win	Purton Kingsdown

Mere Peace Memorial Sports and Recreation Ground, Mere
Referee: Kieran Bowden
3 Nov 26
19:45 UTC

Royal Wootton Bassettt Town Dev	5–1	Wroughton
Lyall; Greenouff; Moss; Dogbatse

Gerard Buxton Sports Ground, Royal Wootton Bassett
Referee: Andrew Lacey
3 Nov 26
19:45 UTC

Warminster Town	3–4	Shrewton United
Johnson 17', 26' (pen.); Walton 72'		Utterson 20', 38'; Glasson 24'; Samuda 77'

Weymouth Street, Warminster
Referee: Matthew Griffith
3 Nov 26
19:45 UTC

Calne Town	4–1	Pewsey Vale
Byrne; Jones; Stiles

Bremhill View, Calne
Referee: Stephehn Southam
17 Nov 26
19:30 UTC

Bradford Town Res	–	Bishops Cannings

Trowbridge Road, Bradford-on-Avon
Referee: Benjamin Avery
3 Nov 26
19:45 UTC

Melksham Town	3–1	Swindon Supermarine

Oakfield Stadium, Melksham
Referee: Anthony Brewerton
3 Nov 26
19:45 UTC

Amesbury Town	3–4	Bemerton Heath Harlequins Res

Bonnymead Park, Amesbury
Referee: Lacey Chivers-Hickton
