= Ray Baverstock =

English footballer and manager

Personal information
- Date of birth: 3 December 1963 (age 62)
- Place of birth: Southall, England
- Position: Right-back

Youth career
- Swindon Town

Senior career*
Years	Team	Apps	(Gls)
1981–1983	Swindon Town	17	(0)
1983–1990	Cheltenham Town		
1990–1991	Gloucester City		
1991–1992	Worcester City		
1992	Bath City	2	(0)
1992	Moreton Town		
1992–1993	Gloucester City		
1993–????	Trowbridge Town		
- Forest Green Rovers
2002–2003	Cirencester Town		
- Swindon Supermarine

Managerial career
- ????–2002: Cirencester Town
- 2002: Devizes Town
- 2002–2003: Swindon Supermarine
- 2003–2004: Swindon Supermarine
- * Club domestic league appearances and goals

Ray Baverstock (born 3 December 1963) is an English former professional football midfielder.

Baverstock began his career as an apprentice with Swindon Town, turning professional in December 1981. He made his debut on 4 September 1982 as Swindon lost 2–1 away to Blackpool. He played seventeen times that season, but was released in May 1983 and joined Cheltenham Town.

He played over 250 games for Cheltenham and had spells with Gloucester City and Worcester City before joining Bath City in July 1992. He played the first two games of the following season, but left in August 1992 to join Moreton Town after disagreements over his wages with Bath.

He went on to play for Gloucester City, Trowbridge Town, Forest Green Rovers and Cirencester Town, before becoming manager of Cirencester Town and then Devizes Town from August 2002. He left Devizes to take over as manager of Swindon Supermarine in November 2002, and guided them to safety from relegation at the end of the season, albeit on the final day. He resigned as manager in October 2003 due his increased business commitments, but was reappointed just twelve days later. He resigned again in January 2004.
