= Supermarine F.C. =

Former association football club in England

- Full name: Supermarine Football Club
- Nickname(s): The Marine
- Founded: 1946
- Dissolved: 1992
- Ground: Webbswood Stadium, South Marston
- Capacity: 2,900 (350 seats)
- League: Hellenic Football League

Supermarine Football Club was a semi-professional football club based in South Marston, near Swindon, England.

The club, named after the Supermarine aircraft company, played in the Hellenic Football League. In 1992 they merged with fellow Wiltshire Football League founder members, league, and local rivals Swindon Athletic F.C., to create Swindon Supermarine F.C.

== History ==
The club was originally set up in 1946 from the social club associated with the Supermarine aircraft company. The club was originally called Vickers Armstrong and later shortened to Vickers FC. The club originally played in the Swindon & District league and become founder members of the Wiltshire Football League in 1976, starting in Senior Division 1. The club joined the Hellenic League in Division One for the 1982–83 season, under the name of Supermarine, and obtained promotion to the Premier Division following their first campaign, where the club spent the next seven seasons. During their time in the Premier Division, the club also won the Wiltshire Senior Cup in the 1985–86 season.

After being relegated from the Premier Division in season 1989–90, the club struggled in Division One and at the end of the 1991–92 season, their last before they merged, finished in last place.

In 1992 a merger with fellow local club in the Hellenic Football League, Swindon Athletic F.C. formed a new club Swindon Supermarine F.C.

Both clubs had problems with Supermarine finishing bottom of Division One in the 1991–92 season and Swindon Athletic having difficulties meeting the new ground grading requirements, required by the league, at their Swindon Borough Council owned Southbrook Recreation ground, so the two clubs decided to merge and took Swindon Athletic's place in the Hellenic League Premier Division.

== Honours ==
=== League honours ===
- Hellenic Football League Division One:
  - Runners up (1): 1982–83

=== Cup honours ===
- Wiltshire Senior Cup
  - Winners (1): 1985–86
  - Runners Up (1): 1984–85
