= Kyle Lapham =

English footballer

Personal information
- Full name: Kyle Jonathan Lapham
- Date of birth: 5 January 1986 (age 40)
- Place of birth: England
- Position: Defender

Team information
- Current team: Swindon Supermarine

Youth career
- 2001–2005: Swindon Town

Senior career*
Years	Team	Apps	(Gls)
2005–2006	Swindon Town	2	(0)
2006	→Cirencester Town (loan)		
2006	Cirencester Town		
2006–2011	Swindon Supermarine	143	(5)
2011	Dandenong Thunder		
2011–2016	Swindon Supermarine		
- * Club domestic league appearances and goals

Kyle Jonathan Lapham (born 5 January 1986) is an English former professional footballer, who played as a right back for Swindon Supermarine. He is one of Swindon Supermarine's most capped players of all time.

== Career ==
=== Swindon Town ===
In 2001, Lapham signed on for Swindon Town's youth. The player received praise by youth coaches Iffy Onuora and Ian Woan. In December 2004, Lapham was all set to leave his football career for plumbing after being told a professional contract with the club was unlikely. However, due to injuries to Sean O'Hanlon and Steve Jenkins in April 2005, Lapham was in contention to make his first team debut. Despite Jenkins recovering enough to be named in the starting lineup against Huddersfield, Lapham was given a debut. Lapham was one of 1/4 youth teamers to make their debuts due to Rory Fallon and David Duke being sent off. The match finished 4–0 to Huddersfield.

Lapham once again received praise for his ability from Swindon Town manager Andy King, who said he "defended magnificently" when helping the youth team win the Youth Alliance cup. He was given another chance to shine for the first team at the end of the campaign against Chesterfield in a 1–1 tie. Due to Lapham's impressive performance he was rewarded with a professional contract on 6 June 2005 as well as winning the club's Young Player of the Year award.

The following season Lapham had gained a knee injury preventing him from making and impression for the start of the season. After not making an appearance in the first half of the season, former youth coach and new Swindon Town manager, Iffy Onuora, sent him on loan to Cirencester Town for 3 months. Upon his return to Swindon Town at the beginning of May, he was informed he was surplus to requirements at the County Ground. He went on to sign a contract with Cirencester Town.
