= Chris Taylor (footballer, born 1985) =

English footballer

Personal information
- Full name: Christopher James Taylor
- Date of birth: 30 October 1985 (age 40)
- Place of birth: Swindon
- Position: Midfielder

Team information
- Current team: Swindon Supermarine

Youth career
- 2002–2005: Swindon Town

Senior career*
Years	Team	Apps	(Gls)
2005–2006	Swindon Town	4	(0)
2005	→Newport County (loan)	?	(?)
2005	→Newport County (loan)	?	(?)
2006–2011	Swindon Supermarine	?	(?)
2011	Dandenong Thunder	?	(?)
2011	Maidstone United	?	(?)
2011	Cirencester Town	?	(?)
2011	Swindon Supermarine	?	(15)

International career
	England U15	-	(-)
- * Club domestic league appearances and goals

Christopher James Taylor (born 30 October 1985) was a professional association football player for Swindon Town. He currently plays for Swindon Supermarine after a spell in Australia and two other English teams.
