= Tom Jones (footballer, born 1964) =

English footballer (born 1964)

Tommy Jones
Personal information
- Full name: Thomas Jones
- Date of birth: 7 October 1964 (age 62)
- Place of birth: Aldershot, England
- Position: Midfielder

Youth career
- Chelsea
- Farnborough Town

Senior career*
Years	Team	Apps	(Gls)
19??–1987	Weymouth		
1987–1988	Aberdeen	28	(3)
1988–1992	Swindon Town	207	(12)
1992–1996	Reading	79	(2)
1996–1997	Woking	40	(2)
1997–1998	Forest Green Rovers		
1998–2002	Swindon Supermarine	82	(14)
2003–2004	Shrivenham		

Managerial career
- 1999–2000: Swindon Town (youth)
- 2004: Swindon Supermarine
- 2004–2006: Busan I'Park (assistant)
- 2006–2007: Armenia (assistant)
- 2007: Armenia (caretaker)
- 2010–2011: Swindon Supermarine (assistant)
- 2013–2018: Chippenham Town (assistant)
- 2018–2020: Highworth Town (assistant)
- 2020–2022: Royal Wootton Bassett Town (assistant)
- * Club domestic league appearances and goals

Tom Jones (born 7 October 1964) is an English football coach and former player who played as a midfielder.

== Career ==
After starting his career with Weymouth he was signed by Aberdeen, and played 28 league games for them in 1987–88.

Jones then moved to Swindon Town, playing his first Football League game for them in 1988–89. He went on to make 168 league appearances for Swindon, before moving to Reading.

After 79 league matches for Reading he moved to Woking. He then played a season for Forest Green Rovers, before playing four years at Swindon Supermarine and ending his active career at Shrivenham.

In 1999 during his time at Swindon Supermarine Jones was persuaded by Swindon Town manager Jimmy Quinn to become youth coach at the club. Jones left the position in 2000 when Quinn was sacked.

He later had a brief stint as manager of Swindon Supermarine before traveling to South Korea in 2004 to join Busan I'Park manager Ian Porterfield as his assistant manager.

When Porterfield became manager of the Armenia national team in 2006, Jones followed him as assistant. When Porterfield died from cancer of the colon on 11 September 2007, Jones and Vardan Minasyan were placed temporarily in charge of the national team.

Jones later became assistant manager at Swindon Supermarine, before stepping down from his role in February 2011, at the same time as the manager Mark Collier.

In November 2013 Mark Collier was named new manager of Chippenham Town with Jones once again as his assistant. Jones left his position as assistant manager in January 2018.

In June 2018 he was made assistant manager of Highworth Town. In 2020 he joined Royal Wootton Bassett Town as an assistant to Mark Collier's son Sam Collier. He left the club in 2022 and retired from coaching.

== Honours ==
Reading

- Football League Second Division: 1993–94

Woking

- FA Trophy: 1996–97
