= Chris Allen (footballer, born 1989) =

English footballer

Personal information
- Full name: Christopher Martin Allen
- Date of birth: 3 January 1989 (age 37)
- Place of birth: Devizes, England
- Height: 5 ft 11 in (1.80 m)
- Position: Midfielder

Team information
- Current team: Chippenham Town

Youth career
- 2005–2007: Swindon Town

Senior career*
Years	Team	Apps	(Gls)
2007–2009	Swindon Town	12	(0)
2009–2010	Weymouth	19	(0)
2010	Swindon Supermarine	16	(0)
2010–2012	Forest Green Rovers	21	(0)
2011–2012	→ Staines Town (loan)	4	(1)
2012	→ Frome Town (loan)	9	(0)
2012–2015	Bath City	98	(7)
2015	→ Chippenham Town (loan)	4	(0)
2015–	Chippenham Town	12	(1)
- * Club domestic league appearances and goals as of 12:16, 9 December 2015 (UTC)

Christopher Martin Allen (born 3 January 1989) is an English footballer who played in the Football League for Swindon Town. A midfielder, he currently plays for Chippenham Town.

== Career ==
Allen was born in Devizes, Wiltshire, and began his junior career with his local Devizes under-9s team before joining the youth set-up at Swindon Town. Allen captained Swindon's youth team to the quarter-final stages of the 2007 FA Youth Cup, in which they were eliminated by Newcastle United after Allen was sent off near the beginning of extra time. Manager Paul Sturrock offered Allen a two-year professional deal which was signed in May 2007. He made his Swindon Town debut in the 4–1 win against Brentford in the Football League Trophy in September 2007, and made his Football League debut three months later, on 8 December in the starting eleven for an away game against Southend United which Swindon won 2–1. He made 16 appearances in first-team competitions before being released in May 2009.

He trained with Exeter City before the 2009–10 season, but no deal was forthcoming, and he signed for Conference South club Weymouth on non-contract terms in August 2009.

After leaving Weymouth, Allen signed for Southern Football League Premier Division side Swindon Supermarine. He played a key role in their FA Cup run when they were eventually knocked out in the second round by Football League outfit, Colchester United.

In December 2010, he signed for Conference National outfit Forest Green Rovers. An agreement was struck between Forest Green and Swindon Supermarine that the player would be registered with both clubs. Allen made his full debut on 3 January 2011 in a 3–0 home loss against Crawley Town. Allen was offered an extension to his stay at Forest Green at the end of the season with the offer of a new contract from Dave Hockaday to stay with the club for the 2011–12 season.

Allen agreed to stay with Forest Green by signing a new one-year contract at The New Lawn in June 2011. On 2 December 2011, Allen joined Conference South side Staines Town on a one-month loan deal. On 6 March 2012, Allen again left Forest Green temporarily to join Frome Town on a one-month loan deal. Allen made his Frome debut in a 1–0 home win on 10 March 2012, against Barwell. At the end of the season Allen was released by Forest Green.

In August 2012, Allen joined Conference South outfit Bath City. A successful first season at Twerton Park saw him retained in the summer of 2013 for another year with the club. He agreed an extension to remain a Bath player for the 2014–15 season in July 2014.

In October 2015, after an initial loan spell, Allen signed for Chippenham Town on a permanent deal.
