= Swindon Supermarine F.C. =

Association football club in England

Coordinates: 51°36′18″N 1°43′48″W

Swindon Supermarine
- Full name: Swindon Supermarine Football Club
- Nickname: The Marine
- Founded: 1992
- Ground: Imagine Cruising Stadium, South Marston, Swindon
- Capacity: 2,000 (350 seats)
- Chairman: Jez Webb
- Manager: Bobby Wilkinson
- League: Southern League Division One South
- 2025–26: Southern League Division One South, 12th of 22
- Website: ssfc.org.uk
Home colours	Away colours

Swindon Supermarine Football Club is a semi-professional football club based in South Marston, Swindon, England. The club plays in the Southern League Division One South and is affiliated to the Wiltshire Football Association. The club plays at the Imagine Cruising Stadium on the northern edge of South Marston, north-east of Swindon.

== History ==
The club was established in 1992 as a merger between two local clubs in the Hellenic Football League, Supermarine F.C. and Swindon Athletic F.C. Both clubs had problems with Supermarine finishing bottom of Division One in the 1991–92 season and Swindon Athletic having difficulties meeting the new ground grading requirements, required by the league, at their Swindon Borough Council owned Southbrook Recreation ground, so the two clubs decided to merge and took Swindon Athletic's place in the Hellenic League Premier Division.

In 1997–98, the new club won the Hellenic League championship but were not promoted due to ground requirements. The championship was won for the second time in 2000–01 and this time they were accepted into the Southern League. After four years of struggle at the foot of the Southern League Western Division table, not helped by a rapid succession of managerial changes, they qualified for the play-offs in 2005–06 but lost to Hemel Hempstead Town in the semi-finals. In 2006–07, they again reached the promotion play-offs, where this time they were successful after beating Burnham in the semi-final and Taunton Town in the final. This earned them a place in the Southern League Premier Division. That season also saw the club secure the Wiltshire Premier Shield, a decade after their first win in the competition.

Their inaugural season in the Southern League Premier Division saw them finish in 12th place. They also earned a mid-table finish in the following 2008–09 season and had an excellent run in the FA Trophy, reaching the Third Round (last sixteen) where they lost to the holders Ebbsfleet United.

At the end of the 2009–10 season, the club announced that it was facing a financial shortfall of £50,000, which would affect its immediate position in the Southern League. A supporters consortium then took over the club and saved it through various commitments and a sponsorship drive which allowed it to continue in the Southern League Premier Division in the 2010–11 season. Part of the sponsorship drive included the ground sponsorship which was taken up by local company H J Webb & Son and the ground became known as the Webbswood Stadium, for sponsorship reasons, from August 2010. Before the start of the season, former player manager Tom Jones returned to the club as assistant manager.

The 2010–11 season saw them narrowly miss a lucrative FA Cup Third Round tie after a 1–0 defeat at League One side Colchester United in the club's best ever FA Cup run. In February 2011, Mark Collier, who had been appointed as the club's manager in March 2004, and assistant Tom Jones both resigned due to proposed budget cuts with player-managers Gary Horgan and Matt Robinson taking over as temporary managers until the end of the season. The duo guided Marine to a final placing of 10th in the Southern League Premier Division, which remains their best league finish to date. Season 2011–12 kicked off with Horgan and Robinson now as permanent managers but the season did not go well with relegation to Division One South & West confirmed on the last day of the season.

In May 2012, the management team stepped down and Highworth Town manager Dave Webb was offered and accepted the manager's position. In his first season in charge, Webb led the team to a 4th-place finish and a place in the play-offs where they lost in the semi-final on penalties at Merthyr Town. The following campaign also ended with defeat in the play-offs, once more losing at Merthyr Town at the semi-final stage. After a mid-table finish in the next season, the club reached the play-offs again in 2015–16 only to be beaten in the semi-final one more time, on this occasion losing at Taunton Town.

In mid-January 2018, manager Dave Webb departed the club and his assistant, Lee Spalding, took on the role of caretaker manager until the end of the season. The team finished in fifth place and a playoff position with a semi-final at Evesham United. After drawing 1–1 after extra time Marine went through 5–4 on penalties and a playoff final at third-placed Wimborne Town. In another tight game, which ended 0–0 after extra time, Marine won 4–3 on penalties and won promotion back to step 3 and what will be the Southern League Premier South Division for season 2018–19. After the playoff win and promotion, Lee Spalding was appointed manager.

== Crest ==
The club's former crest until the start of the 2015–16 season

The club's former crest 2016-2022

From the start of the 2002–03 season, the club no longer wore the traditional blue and white hooped kit. Moreover, a new club crest was added to the team's shirt in place of the wording "Swindon Supermarine FC". A redesigned crest was adopted from the start of the 2015–16 season before an update was made in 2017/18 season.

== Colours and kits ==
The merger between the two Hellenic League clubs saw the new club soon adopt a new hooped blue and white Umbro kit. After four years of the club's existence Wemyss Lodge took over as sponsor, and remained a part of the blue and white hooped shirts until the end of season 2001–02. From then on, the team's shirts have been predominantly blue. Initially the new plain blue kits were sponsored by Fuelforce, who also secured the away kit sponsorship. Later, the club announced a major sponsorship deal that saw Wonga.com appear as the club's exclusive home and away shirt sponsor for the 2011–12 season. Despite there not being much photographic evidence of Marine's away colours, the colours are traditionally red. Unlike the home kit, the away kit has not changed to any extent.

=== Sponsors ===
Period	Home kit supplier	Home kit sponsor
1992–1993	Hummel	High Class Windows
1993–1996	Umbro	E.F.P.
1996–1999	Umbro	Wemyss Lodge
1999–2000	Prostar	Wemyss Lodge
2000–2002	Unknown	Wemyss Lodge
2002–2003	Unknown	FuelForce
2003–2005	Nike	FuelForce
2005–2006	Adidas	FuelForce
2006–2007	Adidas	NINE
2007–2008	Adidas	Lawson Group Ltd
2008–2009	Adidas	GWR Kids, Bang & Olufsen, Select Recruitment
2009–2010	Adidas	D.J. Rideout General Builders
2010–2011	Adidas	Smith Roofing Contractors Ltd
2011–2015	Adidas	Wonga.com
2015–2017	Adidas	Orbital Shopping Park
2017–2022	Macron	Unividual

== Ground ==
Swindon Supermarine play their home games at Hunts Copse in South Marston, currently also known as the Imagine Cruising Stadium for sponsorship purposes. The ground possesses two adjacent seated stands with a combined total of 300 seats, a floodlit pitch, a shop and clubhouse, and a 6 ft perimeter fence. It is 4½ miles from Swindon station.

The improvements necessary for the club to step up to the Southern League in 2001 saw the building of a new 225-seater stand, taking the total covered seating capacity to 300, as well as new perimeter fencing and toilets. Although not required to meet the league's guidelines, new floodlights were put in place at the same time. At the close of the 2016–17 season, a new community facility was formally opened at the ground that included a recently built changing rooms block.

=== Training ground ===
In 2016, Swindon Supermarine officially opened the new indoor training facility, the Swindome, behind the east goal. The facility also has an upstairs gym and changing rooms. The all-weather 3G facility was quoted as "state of the art" and Swindon Supermarine chairman, Jez Webb, stated that he felt the facility would attract more people to the club and help attract a better quality of player to the first team.

== Rivalries ==
Marine's rivals are considered to be Cirencester Town and Chippenham Town.

== Honours ==
=== League honours ===
- Hellenic Football League Premier Division:
  - Winners (2): 1997–98, 2000–01
- Southern Football League West Division
  - Play-off winners: 2017–18

=== Cup honours ===
- Wiltshire Premier Shield
  - Winners (2) 1996–97, 2006–07, 2018–19, 2021–22
  - Runners Up (3) 1994–95, 1998–99, 2002–03
- Wiltshire Senior Cup
  - Winners (1): 2016–17
  - Runners Up (1): 1993–94
- Hellenic Football League Challenge Cup:.
  - Winners (2): 1996–97, 1999–00
  - Runners up (2): 1994–95, 2000–01
- Hellenic Football League Floodlit Cup:
  - Winners (3): 1997–98, 1999–00, 2000–01
  - Runners up (1): 1995–96

== Statistics ==
=== Player records ===
==== Appearances ====
	Name	Games	Goals
1	Chris Taylor	378	29
2	Danny Allen	347	24
3	Kyle Lapham	340	9
4	Sam Morris	333	20
5	Damon York	314	136
6	Lee Hartshorn	287	13
6	Steve Bennett	287	14
7	Steve Davies	271	13
8	Peter Farrow	265	20
9	Ashley Edenborough	259	104
10	Gary Horgan	257	5
11	Alan Clark	245	6
12	Tom King	244	0
13	Mark Ayres	234	0
14	Neil Matthews	223	69
15	Nick Stanley	200	49
16	Leigh Henry	185	4
17	Giles Harris	181	30
18	Luke Hopper	175	61
19	Dave Bampton	175	9
20	Keith Walker	173	54
21	Tate Hulbert	168	60
22	Josh Parsons	162	105

==== Top scorers ====
	Name	Goals	Games	Average
1	Damon York	136	314	0.43
2	Josh Parsons	105	162	0.65
3	Ashley Edenborough	104	239	0.44
4	Neil Matthews	69	223	0.31
5	Pete Lango	69	113	0.61
6	Dave Porter	68	86	0.79
8	Luke Hopper	61	178	0.34
7	Tate Hulbert	60	168	0.36
9	Nick Stanley	49	200	0.25

=== Club records ===
- Best league performance: 10th in Southern League Premier Division, 2010–11
- Best FA Cup performance: Second round, 2010–11
- Best FA Trophy performance: Third round, 2008–09
- Best FA Vase performance: Second round, 1998–99, 1999–2000

== Notable former players ==
1. Players that have played/managed in the football league or any foreign equivalent to this level (i.e. fully professional league).
2. Players with full international caps.
- (England) Chris Allen
- (England) Ray Baverstock
- (England) Andrew Caton
- (England) Mark Draycott
- (England) Jacob Erskine
- (England) Wayne Hatswell
- (England) Ashan Holgate
- (England) Tom Jones
- (England) Matthew Robinson
- (England) Kayden Jackson
- (Republic of Ireland) Carl McHugh
- (England) Denny Mundee
- (England) Will Puddy
- (Guadeloupe) Ludovic Quistin
- (England) Chris Smith
- (England) David Stroud
- (Wales) Ady Williams

== Former coaches ==
1. Managers/Coaches that have played/managed in the football league or any foreign equivalent to this level (i.e. fully professional league).
2. Managers/Coaches with full international caps.
- (England) Ray Baverstock
- (England) Tom Jones
- (England) Don Rogers
