= Penhill F.C. =

Former association football club in England

- Full name: Penhill Football Club
- Founded: 1968
- Dissolved: 1992
- Ground: Southbrook Recreation Ground
- League: Hellenic Football League

Penhill F.C., known for its final three years as Swindon Athletic F.C., was a semi-professional football club based in the Penhill area of Swindon, England.

They played in the Hellenic Football League. In 1992 they merged with fellow Wiltshire Football League founder members, league, and local rivals Supermarine F.C., to create Swindon Supermarine F.C.

== History ==
The club was established in 1968 and known as Penhill F.C. until the end of the 1988–89 season when it took the name Swindon Athletic F.C..

They were founder members of the Wiltshire Football League in 1976, but started two divisions lower in Section A of the Junior Division. That season saw the club promoted and become Wiltshire Junior Cup winners. The next season saw them become Senior Division 2 champions and they went on to become Senior Division 1 champions in the 1982–83 and 1983–84 campaigns. At the end of the 1984–85 competition they were promoted to the Hellenic Football League Division One and gained promotion at the first attempt when they finished as runners-up. Between the 1982–83 and 1990–91 seasons the club also had some cup success, winning the Wiltshire Senior Cup three times and also finishing runners-up on three occasions.

They then remained in the Premier Division of the Hellenic league until their merger at the end of season 1991–92 with fellow local club in the Hellenic Football League Supermarine F.C., forming a new club Swindon Supermarine F.C.

Prior to the merger, both clubs had problems, with Supermarine finishing bottom of Division One in the 1991–92 season and Swindon Athletic having difficulties meeting the new ground grading requirements, required by the league, at their Swindon Borough Council owned Southbrook recreation ground. The merged club took Swindon Athletic's place in the Hellenic League Premier Division.

== Honours ==
=== League ===
- Hellenic Football League Division One
  - Runners up (2): 1982–83, 1985–86
- Wiltshire Football League Senior Division One
  - Winners (2): 1982–83, 1983–84
- Wiltshire Football League Senior Division Two
  - Winners (1): 1977–78

=== Cup ===
- Wiltshire Senior Cup
  - Winners (3) 1982–83, 1986–87, 1989–90
  - Runners Up (3) 1983–84, 1985–86, 1990–91
- Wiltshire Junior Cup
  - Winners (1) 1976–77
- Wiltshire Football League Ghia Senior KO Cup
  - Winners (1): 1984–85
- Wiltshire Football League Subsidiary Cup
  - Winners (1): 1980–81
