= Swindon Victoria F.C. =

Former association football club in England

Swindon Victoria
- Full name: Swindon Victoria Football Club
- Nickname: The Vics
- Founded: 1884
- Dissolved: 1975
- Ground: Duke of Edinburgh Ground
Home colours

Swindon Victoria Football Club was a football club based in Swindon, Wiltshire, England.

== History ==
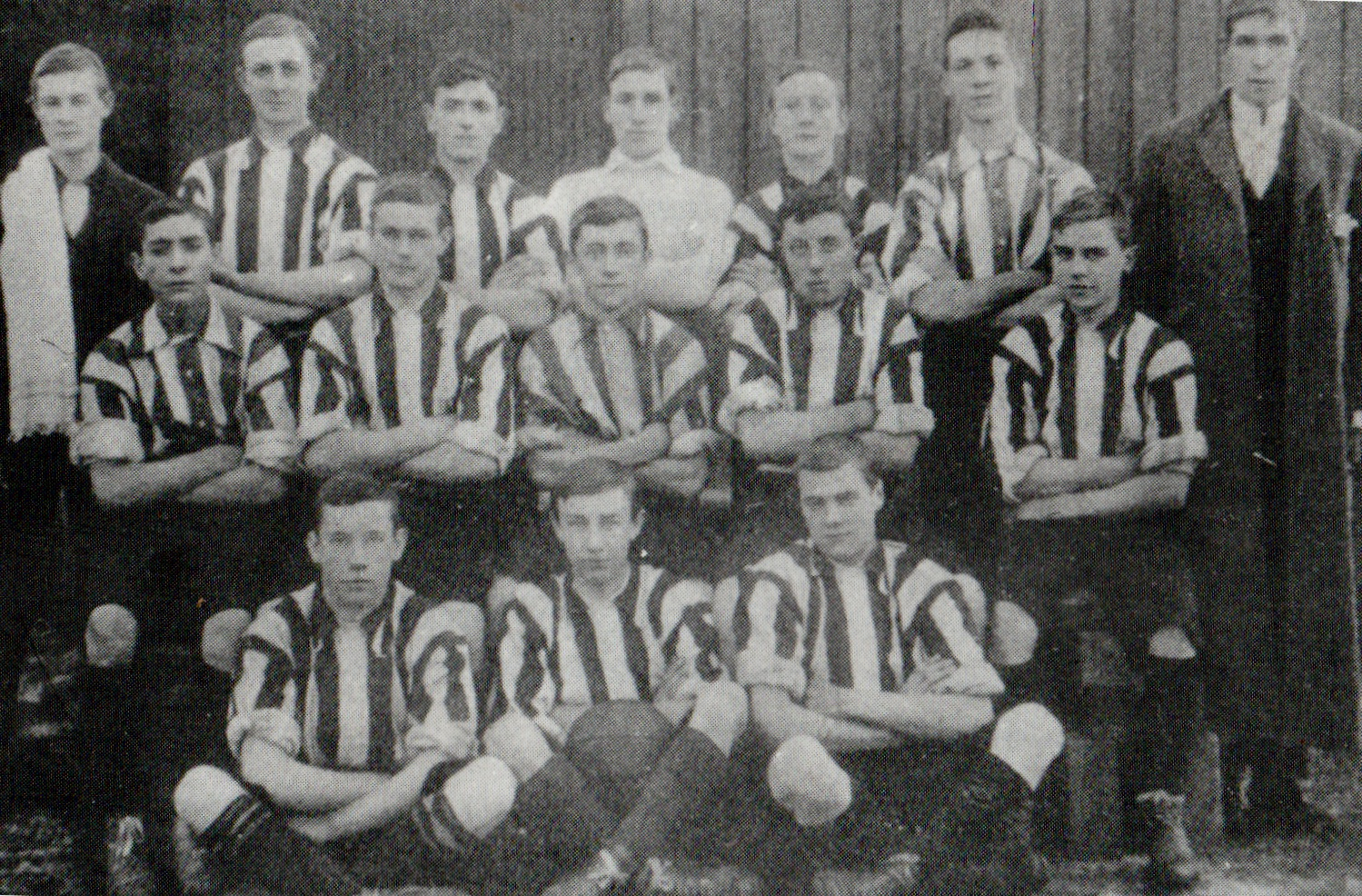
Swindon Victoria F.C. 1898–99

Swindon Victoria, formed out of the Swindon Victoria Cricket Club, is recorded as both an association football and rugby football in 1884, but by November 1889 was exclusively playing association.

It was a founder member of the Swindon and District League in 1894, and was the first winner of the Swindon & District Knockout Cup. The club briefly resigned from the Wiltshire League in 1900 in protest at a censure for refusing to finish a Wiltshire Cup tie against Chippenham.

The club's finest season was 1920–21, in which it won the Wiltshire Senior Cup and Wiltshire League, and also reached the final of the FA Amateur Cup for the only time, having played through the tournament from the qualifying rounds. The club was unlucky in that opponents Bishop Auckland not only had significant final experience, being the Cup holders, but also had a short journey to Ayresome Park for the final, while Swindon had a 500-mile round trip. Although the club lost 4–2 (having conceded four in the first half), it had the benefit of sharing in the receipts from a 20,000 gate; the club's average match takings beforehand had been £6.

The most prominent league in which the club played was the Western League from 1924 to 1926. The Vics' best FA Cup run was to the fourth and final qualifying round in 1930–31, but it lost 3–0 at Trowbridge Town.

In 1975, because the club's ground no longer met the level of facilities required by the Wiltshire Football Association, the club merged with Malmesbury United, to form a new club, Malmesbury Victoria, playing in Malmesbury. The new club took Swindon Victoria's place in Division One of the Wiltshire Combination.

== Colours ==
The club wore red and white striped shirts, black or white shorts, and black socks, with a white change kit.

== Ground ==
The club played at the Duke of Edinburgh Ground at Gorse Hill.
