= AFOL =

AFOL may refer to:

- Africa Online, an African Internet service provider
- Adult Fan of Lego

== See also ==
- Afful
