= 2014–15 Southern Football League =

The 2014–15 season was the 112th in the history of the Southern League, which is an English football competition featuring semi-professional and amateur clubs from the South West, South Central and Midlands of England and South Wales. From the current season onwards, the Southern League is known as Evo-Stik Southern Premier, following a sponsorship deal with Evo-Stik.

Following the liquidation of Premier Division club Hinckley United and the resignation of Thatcham Town from Division One South & West at the end of the season, plus the resignation of Vauxhall Motors from the Conference North, Fleet Town were reprieved from relegation in Division One South & West.

There were subsequently further movements after Worksop Town resigned from the Northern Premier League. Wingate & Finchley had initially been relegated to Isthmian League Division One North, but were readmitted to the Premier Division. Knock-on effects included Ware moving back to the Isthmian after first being placed in the Southern League Division One Central, and Hayes & Yeading United moving to the Southern Premier after initially being placed in the Isthmian Premier. Hayes & Yeading replaced Halesowen Town who had been moved from the Northern to the Southern, and were moved back. Corby Town returned to the Southern after first being placed in the Northern, and Stourbridge moved the other way. Ware were replaced in Division One Central by Bedworth United, who were transferred from the Northern Premier League Division One South.

However, Hayes & Yeading United were once again moved, this time back to the Conference South, when Hereford United were expelled from the Football Conference, and demoted to the Southern Premier.

== Premier Division ==
The Premier Division consisted of 24 clubs, including 17 clubs from the previous season and seven new clubs:

- Two clubs promoted from Division One Central:
  - Dunstable Town
  - Slough Town
- Two clubs promoted from Division One South & West:
  - Cirencester Town
  - Paulton Rovers
- Plus:
  - Dorchester Town, relegated from the Conference South
  - Hereford United, expelled from the Conference Premier and accepted into the Southern League subject to conditions
  - Histon, relegated from the Conference North

Hereford United F.C. was wound up in the high court in London on 19 December 2014, after it could not be satisfactorily proven that the club's owner had sufficient funding to pay the club's creditors. The main creditor was HM Revenue and Customs. The club's record in the Southern League was officially expunged on 5 January 2015.

=== League table ===
Southern Football League Premier Division
- Season: 2014–15
- Champions: Corby Town
- Promoted: Corby Town; Truro City
- Relegated: Arlesey Town; Banbury United; Burnham
- Matches: 506
- Goals: 1,529 (3.02 per match)
- Top goalscorer: 25 – Stewart Yetton (Weymouth)
- Biggest home win: Poole Town 7 – 0 Frome Town, 25 August 2014
- Biggest away win: Slough Town 1 – 7 Redditch United, 11 October 2014
- Highest scoring: St Neots Town 6 – 5 Dorchester Town, 6 December 2014
- Highest attendance: 2203 – Poole Town 2 – 3 Corby Town, 25 April 2015
- Lowest attendance: 75 – Cirencester Town 6 – 1 Dorchester Town, 30 September 2014
- Total attendance: 146,586
- Average attendance: 290

| Pos | Team | Pld | W | D | L | GF | GA | GD | Pts | Promotion or relegation |
|---|---|---|---|---|---|---|---|---|---|---|
| 1 | Corby Town | 44 | 29 | 7 | 8 | 86 | 47 | +39 | 94 | Promoted to the National League North |
| 2 | Poole Town | 44 | 28 | 7 | 9 | 84 | 35 | +49 | 91 | Qualified for the play-offs |
| 3 | Truro City | 44 | 27 | 5 | 12 | 83 | 58 | +25 | 86 | Qualified for the play-offs, then promoted to the National League South |
| 4 | Hungerford Town | 44 | 22 | 13 | 9 | 64 | 36 | +28 | 79 | Qualified for the play-offs |
| 5 | St Neots Town | 44 | 20 | 16 | 8 | 82 | 58 | +24 | 76 | Qualified for the play-offs |
| 6 | Redditch United | 44 | 21 | 12 | 11 | 73 | 44 | +29 | 75 | |
| 7 | Weymouth | 44 | 22 | 7 | 15 | 71 | 71 | 0 | 73 | |
| 8 | Cirencester Town | 44 | 20 | 12 | 12 | 77 | 54 | +23 | 72 | |
| 9 | Hitchin Town | 44 | 20 | 10 | 14 | 78 | 63 | +15 | 70 | |
| 10 | Paulton Rovers | 44 | 18 | 10 | 16 | 65 | 62 | +3 | 64 | |
| 11 | Chippenham Town | 44 | 16 | 13 | 15 | 54 | 54 | 0 | 61 | |
| 12 | Chesham United | 44 | 16 | 12 | 16 | 79 | 72 | +7 | 60 | |
| 13 | Cambridge City | 44 | 14 | 15 | 15 | 71 | 62 | +9 | 57 | |
| 14 | Dunstable Town | 44 | 16 | 9 | 19 | 71 | 78 | −7 | 57 | |
| 15 | Bideford | 44 | 16 | 7 | 21 | 66 | 85 | −19 | 55 | |
| 16 | Slough Town | 44 | 13 | 12 | 19 | 66 | 88 | −22 | 51 | |
| 17 | Dorchester Town | 44 | 14 | 8 | 22 | 63 | 74 | −11 | 50 | |
| 18 | Histon | 44 | 13 | 10 | 21 | 53 | 74 | −21 | 49 | |
| 19 | Biggleswade Town | 44 | 11 | 12 | 21 | 57 | 75 | −18 | 45 | |
| 20 | Frome Town | 44 | 10 | 11 | 23 | 49 | 80 | −31 | 41 | |
| 21 | Banbury United | 44 | 9 | 10 | 25 | 53 | 86 | −33 | 37 | Relegated to Division One South & West |
| 22 | Arlesey Town | 44 | 10 | 6 | 28 | 43 | 84 | −41 | 36 | Relegated to Division One Central |
| 23 | Burnham | 44 | 5 | 8 | 31 | 41 | 89 | −48 | 20 (Note: Burnham were deducted three points for fielding an ineligible player.) | Relegated to Division One South & West |
| 24 | Hereford United | 0 | 0 | 0 | 0 | 0 | 0 | 0 | 0 (Note: Hereford United F.C. was liquidated on 19 December 2014; the club's playing record of Pl25 W8 D6 L11 GF35 GA42 ₧30 was expunged on 5 January 2015.) | Club folded |

Source: fchd.com
Rules for classification: 1) points; 2) goal difference; 3) number of goals scored.

=== Play-offs ===
Semifinals
2 | Poole Town | 0
5 | St Neots Town | 1
3 | Truro City | 1
4 | Hungerford Town | 0

Final
3 | Truro City | 1
5 | St Neots Town | 0

Semi-finals

| 28 April 2015 | Poole Town | 0–1 | St Neots Town | Tatnam, Poole |
| 19:45 | | | Clarke 76' | Attendance: 841 |

| 28 April 2015 | Truro City | 1–0 | Hungerford Town | Treyew Road, Truro |
| 19:45 | Vassell 85' | | | Attendance: 820 |

Final

| 4 May 2015 | Truro City | 1–0 | St Neots Town | Treyew Road, Truro |
| 15:00 | White 67' (pen.) | | | Attendance: 1,450 |

=== Results ===
| Home \ Away | ARL | BAN | BID | BIG | BUR | CAM | CHE | CHI | CIR | COR | DOR | DUN | FRO | HIS | HIT | HUN | PAU | POO | RED | SLO | STN | TRU | WEY |
|---|---|---|---|---|---|---|---|---|---|---|---|---|---|---|---|---|---|---|---|---|---|---|---|
| Arlesey Town | | 2–2 | 0–1 | 2–1 | 2–1 | 0–2 | 0–3 | 0–0 | 1–2 | 1–2 | 1–0 | 0–2 | 2–2 | 2–1 | 0–2 | 2–3 | 0–0 | 0–2 | 1–3 | 1–0 | 1–3 | 2–3 | 0–1 |
| Banbury United | 0–2 | | 2–3 | 2–2 | 0–2 | 2–0 | 1–1 | 2–4 | 0–5 | 0–5 | 2–1 | 2–1 | 1–1 | 4–0 | 0–3 | 1–2 | 0–1 | 0–1 | 0–0 | 3–0 | 1–1 | 1–2 | 3–0 |
| Bideford | 3–0 | 2–2 | | 0–1 | 4–2 | 1–1 | 1–3 | 5–0 | 0–2 | 1–3 | 1–0 | 1–2 | 4–0 | 2–0 | 2–1 | 1–0 | 3–0 | 0–6 | 1–1 | 2–0 | 1–1 | 1–3 | 1–2 |
| Biggleswade Town | 0–1 | 0–0 | 3–0 | | 1–0 | 1–4 | 1–3 | 0–2 | 1–0 | 3–2 | 4–1 | 0–2 | 1–2 | 1–1 | 3–7 | 1–1 | 1–0 | 1–2 | 2–5 | 3–3 | 2–2 | 3–2 | 4–2 |
| Burnham | 0–4 | 0–3 | 5–1 | 1–1 | | 1–2 | 0–2 | 0–0 | 0–1 | 0–3 | 1–5 | 2–0 | 3–1 | 1–3 | 0–0 | 2–2 | 2–3 | 1–3 | 0–2 | 0–2 | 0–1 | 2–2 | 1–2 |
| Cambridge City | 1–1 | 6–1 | 1–0 | 1–1 | 3–0 | | 1–0 | 1–1 | 1–3 | 2–2 | 3–0 | 1–2 | 2–2 | 6–0 | 2–4 | 2–1 | 1–0 | 0–2 | 0–2 | 3–3 | 0–0 | 1–1 | 0–1 |
| Chesham United | 1–3 | 1–0 | 4–2 | 3–2 | 2–0 | 4–4 | | 0–3 | 0–3 | 0–1 | 3–2 | 1–3 | 3–0 | 2–1 | 0–1 | 1–2 | 2–2 | 1–3 | 0–1 | 0–0 | 3–3 | 3–0 | 7–2 |
| Chippenham Town | 3–0 | 3–0 | 1–1 | 1–1 | 3–1 | 1–1 | 1–1 | | 2–1 | 0–2 | 2–1 | 1–0 | 1–0 | 1–0 | 2–3 | 0–1 | 1–1 | 1–0 | 1–2 | 2–0 | 0–1 | 1–2 | 2–3 |
| Cirencester Town | 1–1 | 1–5 | 6–2 | 1–1 | 1–0 | 4–0 | 2–2 | 1–1 | | 0–0 | 6–1 | 1–1 | 3–1 | 2–0 | 2–3 | 1–1 | 0–1 | 3–2 | 3–2 | 3–5 | 1–1 | 2–0 | 0–3 |
| Corby Town | 3–2 | 2–1 | 1–2 | 2–0 | 3–1 | 3–1 | 1–1 | 2–1 | 2–1 | | 2–2 | 2–2 | 3–0 | 1–0 | 2–0 | 1–1 | 4–1 | 1–0 | 0–0 | 1–2 | 1–3 | 1–0 | 5–1 |
| Dorchester Town | 3–1 | 3–1 | 3–3 | 0–1 | 1–0 | 2–2 | 0–0 | 0–1 | 0–1 | 2–1 | | 1–2 | 1–1 | 2–0 | 2–1 | 1–0 | 3–4 | 2–1 | 0–1 | 3–1 | 1–1 | 1–2 | 0–3 |
| Dunstable Town | 5–1 | 2–3 | 1–1 | 1–0 | 4–2 | 1–1 | 3–2 | 5–1 | 0–3 | 1–2 | 3–5 | | 0–4 | 1–3 | 2–1 | 2–6 | 0–2 | 0–2 | 2–1 | 2–4 | 1–3 | 1–2 | 1–3 |
| Frome Town | 2–3 | 4–2 | 0–2 | 1–2 | 1–2 | 2–1 | 1–1 | 0–0 | 0–1 | 1–2 | 1–3 | 0–1 | | 4–2 | 0–3 | 1–0 | 2–0 | 0–1 | 0–4 | 1–1 | 1–1 | 1–0 | 3–1 |
| Histon | 1–0 | 3–0 | 1–2 | 3–0 | 2–1 | 1–1 | 6–5 | 1–3 | 1–1 | 1–2 | 1–0 | 1–0 | 1–2 | | 1–1 | 2–1 | 2–1 | 1–1 | 1–1 | 0–0 | 0–0 | 3–1 | 3–0 |
| Hitchin Town | 2–0 | 2–0 | 3–2 | 1–0 | 4–0 | 2–1 | 4–1 | 1–1 | 0–0 | 2–4 | 0–0 | 3–2 | 1–1 | 0–0 | | 0–2 | 1–0 | 1–0 | 4–0 | 5–2 | 3–4 | 1–2 | 0–3 |
| Hungerford Town | 2–0 | 4–0 | 2–0 | 1–1 | 1–0 | 2–0 | 2–0 | 0–0 | 1–1 | 3–0 | 0–2 | 0–0 | 1–1 | 1–0 | 2–1 | | 2–1 | 0–0 | 1–1 | 2–0 | 0–0 | 2–0 | 2–0 |
| Paulton Rovers | 6–2 | 0–0 | 2–1 | 3–2 | 3–0 | 1–1 | 1–1 | 2–1 | 2–1 | 1–0 | 1–2 | 2–2 | 1–0 | 0–3 | 3–0 | 2–3 | | 4–5 | 1–0 | 2–2 | 0–0 | 1–2 | 1–0 |
| Poole Town | 3–1 | 2–0 | 1–2 | 1–0 | 1–0 | 3–2 | 3–0 | 3–1 | 2–1 | 2–3 | 0–0 | 1–0 | 7–0 | 2–0 | 2–2 | 1–0 | 1–0 | | 0–1 | 2–1 | 0–0 | 3–0 | 4–0 |
| Redditch United | 2–0 | 1–1 | 7–2 | 1–0 | 0–0 | 2–4 | 2–2 | 2–1 | 0–0 | 0–1 | 3–0 | 2–1 | 2–0 | 2–0 | 0–0 | 0–2 | 0–2 | 0–1 | | 4–0 | 2–0 | 0–4 | 1–1 |
| Slough Town | 1–0 | 2–1 | 4–1 | 1–1 | 2–2 | 0–4 | 0–3 | 2–2 | 1–2 | 1–2 | 2–1 | 0–3 | 1–1 | 1–1 | 2–1 | 1–2 | 4–2 | 0–4 | 1–7 | | 3–3 | 1–2 | 3–0 |
| St Neots Town | 3–0 | 2–1 | 1–0 | 2–1 | 3–1 | 0–1 | 2–3 | 3–0 | 4–0 | 2–4 | 6–5 | 3–3 | 3–1 | 4–0 | 6–2 | 1–1 | 1–1 | 3–2 | 0–3 | 0–3 | | 0–2 | 2–0 |
| Truro City | 3–1 | 4–1 | 5–0 | 2–1 | 2–1 | 1–0 | 0–3 | 2–0 | 1–4 | 2–1 | 2–1 | 0–0 | 2–1 | 7–2 | 3–0 | 2–1 | 2–0 | 2–2 | 3–2 | 1–2 | 2–2 | | 2–0 |
| Weymouth | 3–0 | 3–2 | 2–1 | 3–2 | 3–3 | 1–0 | 2–1 | 0–1 | 2–0 | 0–1 | 2–0 | 2–2 | 4–2 | 3–0 | 2–2 | 3–1 | 2–4 | 0–0 | 1–1 | 3–2 | 1–0 | 1–1 | |

Updated to match(es) played on 25 April 2015. Source: SFL Premier Division results grid
Legend: Blue = home team win; Yellow = draw; Red = away team win.

=== Stadia and locations ===
Locations of the Premier Division clubs

| Club | Stadium | Capacity |
|---|---|---|
| Arlesey Town | Hitchin Road | 2,920 |
| Banbury United | Spencer Stadium | 2,000 |
| Bideford | The Sports Ground | 2,000 |
| Biggleswade Town | The Carlsberg Stadium | 3,000 |
| Burnham | The Gore | 2,500 |
| Cambridge City | Bridge Road (groundshare with Histon) | 4,300 |
| Chesham United | The Meadow | 5,000 |
| Chippenham Town | Hardenhuish Park | 2,815 |
| Cirencester Town | Corinium Stadium | 4,500 |
| Corby Town | Steel Park | 3,893 |
| Dorchester Town | The Avenue Stadium | 5,009 |
| Dunstable Town | Creasey Park | 3,200 |
| Frome Town | Badgers Hill | 2,000 |
| Hereford United | Edgar Street | 4,913 |
| Histon | Bridge Road | 4,300 |
| Hitchin Town | Top Field | 4,000 |
| Hungerford Town | Bulpit Lane | 2,500 |
| Paulton Rovers | Athletic Field | 2,500 |
| Poole Town | Tatnam Ground | 2,500 |
| Redditch United | The Valley | 5,000 |
| Slough Town | Holloways Park (groundshare with Beaconsfield SYCOB) | 3,500 |
| St Neots Town | New Rowley Park | 3,500 |
| Truro City | Treyew Road | 3,200 |
| Weymouth | Bob Lucas Stadium | 6,600 |

== Division One Central ==
Division One Central consisted of 22 clubs, including 18 clubs from previous season and four new clubs:

- Bedford Town, relegated from the Premier Division
- Bedworth United, transferred from Northern Premier League Division One South
- Godalming Town, transferred from Division One South & West
- Hanwell Town, promoted from the Spartan South Midlands League

=== League table ===
Southern Football League Division One Central
- Season: 2014–15
- Champions: Kettering Town
- Promoted: Kettering Town; Bedworth United
- Relegated: A.F.C. Hayes
- Matches: 226
- Goals: 759 (3.36 per match)
- Top goalscorer: 17 – Lewis Putman (Aylesbury United)
- Biggest home win: Aylesbury 8 – 1 St Ives Town, 27 September 2014; Aylesbury 8 – 1 Leighton Town, 8 September 2014
- Highest scoring: Chalfont St Peter 5 – 6 Potters Bar Town, 7 October 2014
- Highest attendance: 689 – Kettering Town 2 – 1 Aylesbury United, 9 August 2014
- Lowest attendance: 42 – North Greenford United 1 – 5 Royston Town, 8 November 2014
- Total attendance: 75,406
- Average attendance: 163

| Pos | Team | Pld | W | D | L | GF | GA | GD | Pts | Promotion or relegation |
|---|---|---|---|---|---|---|---|---|---|---|
| 1 | Kettering Town | 42 | 30 | 5 | 7 | 90 | 36 | +54 | 95 | Promoted to the Premier Division |
| 2 | Royston Town | 42 | 27 | 3 | 12 | 74 | 50 | +24 | 84 | Qualified for the play-offs |
| 3 | Aylesbury | 42 | 25 | 7 | 10 | 81 | 46 | +35 | 82 | Qualified for the play-offs |
| 4 | Bedworth United | 42 | 25 | 4 | 13 | 85 | 55 | +30 | 79 | Qualified for the play-offs, then promoted to the Premier Division |
| 5 | Barton Rovers | 42 | 23 | 9 | 10 | 83 | 53 | +30 | 78 | Qualified for the play-offs |
| 6 | Rugby Town | 42 | 22 | 7 | 13 | 78 | 51 | +27 | 73 | Transferred to Northern Premier League Division One South |
| 7 | Hanwell Town | 42 | 21 | 5 | 16 | 71 | 60 | +11 | 68 | |
| 8 | Godalming Town | 42 | 18 | 10 | 14 | 67 | 62 | +5 | 64 | |
| 9 | St Ives Town | 42 | 16 | 12 | 14 | 70 | 77 | −7 | 60 | |
| 10 | Northwood | 42 | 15 | 12 | 15 | 60 | 61 | −1 | 57 | |
| 11 | Marlow | 42 | 15 | 12 | 15 | 58 | 59 | −1 | 57 | Transferred to Division One South & West |
| 12 | Uxbridge | 42 | 15 | 10 | 17 | 71 | 69 | +2 | 55 | |
| 13 | Aylesbury United | 42 | 15 | 8 | 19 | 66 | 80 | −14 | 53 | |
| 14 | Potters Bar Town | 42 | 16 | 2 | 24 | 68 | 77 | −9 | 50 | |
| 15 | Egham Town | 42 | 14 | 8 | 20 | 64 | 81 | −17 | 50 | |
| 16 | Chalfont St Peter | 42 | 11 | 15 | 16 | 60 | 66 | −6 | 48 | |
| 17 | Bedford Town | 42 | 13 | 8 | 21 | 62 | 72 | −10 | 47 | |
| 18 | Leighton Town | 42 | 10 | 13 | 19 | 52 | 71 | −19 | 43 | |
| 19 | Daventry Town | 42 | 12 | 6 | 24 | 47 | 77 | −30 | 42 | Transferred to Northern Premier League Division One South |
| 20 | Beaconsfield SYCOB | 42 | 8 | 16 | 18 | 62 | 75 | −13 | 40 | |
| 21 | North Greenford United | 42 | 8 | 11 | 23 | 55 | 97 | −42 | 35 | Reprieved from relegation |
| 22 | A.F.C. Hayes | 42 | 8 | 7 | 27 | 39 | 88 | −49 | 31 | Relegated to the Combined Counties League |

Source: fchd.com
Rules for classification: 1) points; 2) goal difference; 3) number of goals scored.

=== Play-offs ===
Semifinals
2 | Royston Town | 0 (4)
5 | Barton Rovers | 0 (5)
3 | Aylesbury | 1
4 | Bedworth United | 2

Final
4 | Bedworth United | 2
5 | Barton Rovers | 0

=== Results ===
| Home \ Away | HAY | AYB | AYL | BAR | BEA | BED | BWU | CHA | DAV | EGH | GOD | HAN | KET | LEI | MAR | NGU | NOR | POT | ROY | RUG | STI | UXB |
|---|---|---|---|---|---|---|---|---|---|---|---|---|---|---|---|---|---|---|---|---|---|---|
| A.F.C. Hayes | | 0–1 | 0–2 | 0–4 | 0–1 | 0–4 | 0–2 | 1–1 | 2–0 | 4–1 | 3–1 | 2–2 | 0–5 | 1–3 | 0–1 | 2–2 | 2–2 | 0–3 | 2–0 | 1–0 | 3–1 | 0–2 |
| Aylesbury | 3–1 | | 0–0 | 1–0 | 4–2 | 1–5 | 3–0 | 3–2 | 1–0 | 3–1 | 1–3 | 1–0 | 1–2 | 8–1 | 3–1 | 3–1 | 3–1 | 1–1 | 1–0 | 2–0 | 8–1 | 2–1 |
| Aylesbury United | 0–1 | 3–4 | | 0–1 | 1–1 | 3–2 | 1–4 | 1–1 | 2–0 | 4–2 | 2–3 | 0–4 | 2–2 | 0–0 | 5–1 | 1–1 | 5–3 | 2–1 | 0–2 | 2–3 | 0–3 | 3–1 |
| Barton Rovers | 3–1 | 1–0 | 2–2 | | 3–0 | 1–1 | 0–3 | 1–1 | 1–0 | 4–5 | 4–3 | 3–1 | 0–2 | 2–0 | 0–0 | 2–0 | 3–1 | 4–2 | 0–2 | 2–0 | 2–0 | 2–1 |
| Beaconsfield Town | 1–1 | 1–1 | 4–0 | 4–2 | | 3–5 | 2–5 | 1–1 | 1–2 | 1–2 | 1–1 | 1–0 | 1–2 | 2–2 | 3–1 | 1–0 | 0–0 | 0–1 | 1–3 | 1–2 | 0–1 | 1–1 |
| Bedford Town | 1–1 | 0–2 | 0–1 | 2–4 | 1–1 | | 0–1 | 1–0 | 4–2 | 1–0 | 0–1 | 0–1 | 0–4 | 0–2 | 0–4 | 7–0 | 2–2 | 0–4 | 3–1 | 0–3 | 2–0 | 0–0 |
| Bedworth United | 1–0 | 0–1 | 4–0 | 1–1 | 2–2 | 4–1 | | 3–2 | 2–4 | 1–0 | 0–1 | 2–3 | 1–0 | 2–1 | 1–0 | 3–1 | 1–2 | 3–0 | 4–0 | 1–1 | 4–1 | 2–3 |
| Chalfont St Peter | 0–1 | 2–2 | 3–0 | 1–3 | 1–1 | 1–0 | 0–2 | | 4–1 | 4–1 | 2–1 | 0–3 | 0–0 | 1–0 | 0–3 | 2–2 | 0–0 | 5–6 | 2–1 | 2–2 | 3–1 | 1–3 |
| Daventry Town | 2–0 | 2–1 | 1–3 | 1–7 | 2–2 | 2–2 | 1–2 | 3–1 | | 0–4 | 1–3 | 1–2 | 0–1 | 2–0 | 1–0 | 2–1 | 0–0 | 1–3 | 0–4 | 2–0 | 2–2 | 1–0 |
| Egham Town | 4–0 | 0–2 | 1–2 | 1–3 | 4–3 | 0–2 | 4–4 | 1–1 | 3–0 | | 0–1 | 0–0 | 0–3 | 2–2 | 1–1 | 2–1 | 4–1 | 2–2 | 2–1 | 1–4 | 0–0 | 1–0 |
| Godalming Town | 3–1 | 1–3 | 4–1 | 0–2 | 1–1 | 3–3 | 2–1 | 2–1 | 2–0 | 1–1 | | 2–3 | 0–1 | 0–3 | 1–0 | 3–3 | 0–0 | 3–2 | 2–0 | 2–1 | 2–2 | 0–1 |
| Hanwell Town | 5–2 | 2–1 | 2–1 | 2–3 | 1–3 | 2–1 | 5–0 | 2–0 | 0–2 | 4–1 | 2–0 | | 0–1 | 0–1 | 1–1 | 0–3 | 0–2 | 1–0 | 4–1 | 1–6 | 1–2 | 3–2 |
| Kettering Town | 2–1 | 1–0 | 2–1 | 3–2 | 2–1 | 2–0 | 2–1 | 2–0 | 1–0 | 5–0 | 2–1 | 4–1 | | 3–2 | 0–0 | 3–1 | 5–0 | 3–2 | 5–0 | 0–1 | 5–0 | 0–1 |
| Leighton Town | 4–1 | 1–1 | 2–2 | 1–1 | 1–1 | 1–2 | 0–2 | 1–1 | 2–1 | 0–3 | 0–4 | 0–1 | 3–1 | | 0–1 | 1–1 | 1–1 | 2–0 | 1–4 | 1–3 | 3–5 | 0–2 |
| Marlow | 3–0 | 2–0 | 1–2 | 2–2 | 2–2 | 1–1 | 3–1 | 2–2 | 1–1 | 0–3 | 2–0 | 1–2 | 3–2 | 0–0 | | 2–1 | 0–2 | 2–1 | 0–2 | 2–3 | 2–1 | 0–2 |
| North Greenford United | 3–1 | 1–2 | 1–5 | 0–3 | 0–3 | 2–0 | 3–1 | 1–4 | 4–2 | 1–3 | 3–3 | 3–1 | 0–4 | 1–1 | 2–2 | | 1–0 | 4–3 | 1–5 | 1–1 | 1–2 | 1–1 |
| Northwood | 2–1 | 0–0 | 3–2 | 1–1 | 3–0 | 2–1 | 0–2 | 0–2 | 2–1 | 5–1 | 1–1 | 1–3 | 3–1 | 0–4 | 3–0 | 1–1 | | 1–0 | 1–2 | 2–0 | 4–0 | 0–0 |
| Potters Bar Town | 6–1 | 0–2 | 0–1 | 2–0 | 4–2 | 1–2 | 1–4 | 2–0 | 2–1 | 1–0 | 1–3 | 2–1 | 1–3 | 0–3 | 1–4 | 2–1 | 1–3 | | 0–1 | 2–1 | 1–3 | 4–2 |
| Royston Town | 2–1 | 1–0 | 3–0 | 1–0 | 3–1 | 3–0 | 1–3 | 0–0 | 3–1 | 1–0 | 2–2 | 2–1 | 1–2 | 2–0 | 3–1 | 2–1 | 1–0 | 1–0 | | 2–1 | 2–2 | 0–1 |
| Rugby Town | 1–0 | 1–3 | 0–1 | 0–0 | 2–1 | 3–2 | 1–0 | 2–1 | 0–1 | 6–0 | 3–0 | 1–1 | 3–0 | 2–1 | 1–2 | 4–0 | 2–1 | 2–0 | 1–3 | | 2–2 | 3–2 |
| St Ives Town | 3–0 | 1–1 | 3–1 | 3–1 | 2–2 | 2–1 | 1–3 | 1–1 | 1–0 | 1–0 | 0–1 | 0–0 | 0–0 | 4–0 | 1–1 | 4–0 | 4–2 | 1–3 | 2–4 | 0–3 | | 4–3 |
| Uxbridge | 1–1 | 3–1 | 4–2 | 2–3 | 3–2 | 1–3 | 1–2 | 3–4 | 1–1 | 1–3 | 2–0 | 1–3 | 2–2 | 1–1 | 2–3 | 3–0 | 3–2 | 1–0 | 1–2 | 3–3 | 3–3 | |

Updated to match(es) played on 25 April 2015. Source: SFL Division One Central results grid
Legend: Blue = home team win; Yellow = draw; Red = away team win.

=== Stadia and locations ===
Locations of Division One Central clubs
Greater London Division One Central Clubs
Division One Central Buckinghamshire teams

| Club | Stadium | Capacity |
|---|---|---|
| A.F.C. Hayes | Farm Park | 1,500 |
| Aylesbury | Haywood Way | 1,300 |
| Aylesbury United | Bell Close (groundshare with Leighton Town) | 2,800 |
| Barton Rovers | Sharpenhoe Road | 4,000 |
| Beaconsfield SYCOB | Holloways Park | 3,500 |
| Bedford Town | The Eyrie | 3,000 |
| Bedworth United | The Oval Ground | 3,000 |
| Chalfont St Peter | Mill Meadow | 1,500 |
| Daventry Town | Communications Park | 5,000 |
| Egham Town | The Runnymede Stadium | 5,565 |
| Godalming Town | Weycourt | 3,000 |
| Hanwell Town | Reynolds Field | 3,000 |
| Kettering Town | Latimer Park (groundshare with Burton Park Wanderers) | 2,400 |
| Leighton Town | Bell Close | 2,800 |
| Marlow | Alfred Davis Memorial Ground | 3,000 |
| North Greenford United | Berkeley Fields | 2,000 |
| Northwood | Northwood Park | 3,075 |
| Potters Bar Town | Parkfield | 2,000 |
| Royston Town | Garden Walk | 5,000 |
| Rugby Town | Butlin Road | 6,000 |
| St Ives Town | Westwood Road | 2,000 |
| Uxbridge | Honeycroft | 3,770 |

== Division One South & West ==
Division One South & West consisted of 22 clubs, including 17 clubs from previous season and five new clubs:

- Two clubs relegated from the Premier Division
  - A.F.C. Totton
  - Bashley
- Plus:
  - Larkhall Athletic, promoted from the Western League
  - Sholing, promoted from the Wessex League
  - Wantage Town, promoted from the Hellenic League

Sholing resigned from the league for ground grading reasons. Clevedon Town were later demoted as their floodlights were not to the required standard. Thus, Bishops Cleeve and Bashley were subsequently reprieved from relegation.

=== League table ===
Southern Football League Division One South & West
- Season: 2014–15
- Champions: Merthyr Town
- Promoted: Merthyr Town; Stratford Town
- Matches: 222
- Goals: 750 (3.38 per match)
- Top goalscorer: 27 – John Mills (Didcot Town
- Biggest home win: North Leigh 11 – 0 Bashley, 22 November 2014
- Biggest away win: Bishop's Cleeve 0 – 7 Cinderford Town, 9 September 2014
- Highest scoring: North Leigh 11 – 0 Bashley, 22 November 2014
- Highest attendance: 1534 – Merthyr Town 9 – 0 Bishop's Cleeve, 6 April 2015
- Lowest attendance: 44 – Bishop's Cleeve 5 – 3 Clevedon Town, 16 December 2014
- Total attendance: 82,444
- Average attendance: 178

| Pos | Team | Pld | W | D | L | GF | GA | GD | Pts | Promotion or relegation |
|---|---|---|---|---|---|---|---|---|---|---|
| 1 | Merthyr Town | 42 | 32 | 6 | 4 | 122 | 34 | +88 | 102 | Promoted to the Premier Division |
| 2 | Evesham United | 42 | 27 | 10 | 5 | 94 | 36 | +58 | 91 | Qualified for the play-offs |
| 3 | Stratford Town | 42 | 28 | 5 | 9 | 82 | 40 | +42 | 89 | Qualified for the play-offs, then promoted to the Premier Division |
| 4 | Taunton Town | 42 | 24 | 8 | 10 | 71 | 42 | +29 | 80 | Qualified for the play-offs |
| 5 | Larkhall Athletic | 42 | 23 | 8 | 11 | 82 | 50 | +32 | 77 | Qualified for the play-offs |
| 6 | Yate Town | 42 | 21 | 9 | 12 | 79 | 52 | +27 | 72 | |
| 7 | Didcot Town | 42 | 20 | 11 | 11 | 95 | 66 | +29 | 71 | |
| 8 | North Leigh | 42 | 18 | 13 | 11 | 99 | 58 | +41 | 67 | |
| 9 | Cinderford Town | 42 | 19 | 10 | 13 | 79 | 48 | +31 | 67 | |
| 10 | Mangotsfield United | 42 | 20 | 7 | 15 | 73 | 58 | +15 | 67 | |
| 11 | Shortwood United | 42 | 17 | 14 | 11 | 77 | 55 | +22 | 65 | |
| 12 | Bridgwater Town | 42 | 17 | 11 | 14 | 67 | 59 | +8 | 62 | |
| 13 | Wimborne Town | 42 | 18 | 7 | 17 | 71 | 68 | +3 | 61 | |
| 14 | Swindon Supermarine | 42 | 17 | 5 | 20 | 81 | 79 | +2 | 56 | |
| 15 | AFC Totton | 42 | 16 | 5 | 21 | 65 | 75 | −10 | 53 | |
| 16 | Tiverton Town | 42 | 13 | 10 | 19 | 60 | 69 | −9 | 49 | |
| 17 | Sholing | 42 | 11 | 10 | 21 | 48 | 75 | −27 | 43 | Resigned to the Wessex League |
| 18 | Clevedon Town | 42 | 10 | 6 | 26 | 54 | 111 | −57 | 36 | Demoted to the Western League |
| 19 | Fleet Town | 42 | 8 | 8 | 26 | 49 | 97 | −48 | 32 | Transferred to Division One Central |
| 20 | Wantage Town | 42 | 8 | 4 | 30 | 43 | 100 | −57 | 28 | |
| 21 | Bishop's Cleeve | 42 | 6 | 4 | 32 | 52 | 143 | −91 | 22 | Reprieved from relegation |
| 22 | Bashley | 42 | 1 | 5 | 36 | 20 | 148 | −128 | 8 | Reprieved from relegation |

Source: fchd.com
Rules for classification: 1) points; 2) goal difference; 3) number of goals scored.

=== Play-offs ===
Semifinals
2 | Evesham United | 0
5 | Larkhall Athletic | 3
3 | Stratford Town | 2
4 | Taunton Town | 1

Final
3 | Stratford Town | 3
5 | Larkhall Athletic | 2

=== Results ===
| Home \ Away | TOT | BAS | BIS | BRI | CIN | CLE | DID | EVE | FLE | LAR | MAN | MER | NOR | SHO | SHT | STR | SWI | TAU | TIV | WAN | WIM | YAT |
|---|---|---|---|---|---|---|---|---|---|---|---|---|---|---|---|---|---|---|---|---|---|---|
| AFC Totton | | 4–0 | 5–2 | 1–1 | 1–1 | 3–0 | 5–3 | 1–4 | 4–2 | 1–1 | 0–2 | 1–5 | 1–1 | 2–1 | 0–2 | 0–1 | 6–1 | 1–2 | 1–0 | 3–1 | 0–1 | 1–3 |
| Bashley | 0–4 | | 1–1 | 0–1 | 1–1 | 0–1 | 0–5 | 0–7 | 1–4 | 0–2 | 0–1 | 1–4 | 1–6 | 1–1 | 0–0 | 0–1 | 0–4 | 2–4 | 1–2 | 1–6 | 1–3 | 0–4 |
| Bishop's Cleeve | 1–2 | 4–0 | | 0–4 | 0–7 | 5–3 | 0–5 | 0–5 | 4–2 | 1–4 | 1–2 | 1–3 | 3–3 | 0–0 | 2–4 | 0–1 | 0–4 | 0–4 | 2–1 | 0–4 | 3–4 | 0–3 |
| Bridgwater Town | 3–1 | 4–0 | 5–2 | | 0–4 | 3–0 | 1–2 | 3–5 | 1–1 | 2–3 | 0–0 | 1–2 | 1–1 | 3–0 | 0–3 | 0–0 | 4–3 | 1–2 | 0–0 | 2–0 | 1–1 | 0–2 |
| Cinderford Town | 4–0 | 7–0 | 1–0 | 0–0 | | 1–1 | 2–2 | 2–2 | 3–0 | 3–1 | 2–3 | 0–2 | 2–1 | 1–1 | 2–0 | 2–1 | 2–1 | 1–4 | 1–1 | 5–1 | 2–1 | 1–0 |
| Clevedon Town | 0–2 | 3–1 | 2–2 | 0–1 | 0–6 | | 2–4 | 0–3 | 3–1 | 2–6 | 2–1 | 1–2 | 2–3 | 0–1 | 2–4 | 2–6 | 1–1 | 1–1 | 3–1 | 3–0 | 1–4 | 1–2 |
| Didcot Town | 2–2 | 7–0 | 8–2 | 2–2 | 1–0 | 2–0 | | 1–5 | 3–0 | 0–3 | 2–2 | 2–0 | 1–1 | 3–1 | 2–2 | 1–2 | 2–0 | 0–3 | 2–2 | 1–0 | 5–1 | 2–1 |
| Evesham United | 1–2 | 5–0 | 5–0 | 0–0 | 2–1 | 5–0 | 1–3 | | 2–0 | 0–0 | 1–0 | 0–1 | 2–2 | 1–0 | 1–0 | 2–1 | 5–0 | 2–1 | 2–1 | 5–2 | 2–2 | 0–0 |
| Fleet Town | 2–1 | 1–0 | 3–2 | 0–1 | 1–3 | 1–1 | 2–2 | 1–1 | | 1–6 | 1–0 | 1–2 | 2–2 | 1–0 | 1–1 | 0–1 | 0–2 | 0–6 | 2–0 | 1–2 | 4–2 | 1–2 |
| Larkhall Athletic | 2–0 | 3–0 | 3–2 | 2–1 | 0–0 | 3–2 | 3–2 | 1–2 | 3–0 | | 1–1 | 2–5 | 2–0 | 0–0 | 2–0 | 0–0 | 2–1 | 3–0 | 5–0 | 1–1 | 1–2 | 3–3 |
| Mangotsfield United | 6–0 | 4–1 | 3–1 | 2–1 | 3–1 | 1–0 | 2–1 | 3–0 | 4–0 | 0–1 | | 0–0 | 2–3 | 1–1 | 1–1 | 2–4 | 2–3 | 1–0 | 2–0 | 5–0 | 2–0 | 2–2 |
| Merthyr Town | 4–0 | 6–0 | 9–0 | 1–2 | 4–0 | 7–0 | 3–1 | 0–1 | 2–1 | 4–2 | 4–0 | | 3–1 | 7–1 | 2–2 | 3–1 | 5–2 | 2–1 | 4–1 | 7–0 | 1–1 | 2–1 |
| North Leigh | 2–1 | 11–0 | 6–0 | 2–4 | 0–2 | 6–1 | 2–2 | 0–1 | 2–2 | 0–1 | 6–2 | 1–1 | | 1–0 | 3–3 | 0–1 | 0–0 | 2–0 | 4–0 | 4–2 | 1–0 | 2–1 |
| Sholing | 2–1 | 4–2 | 6–3 | 1–0 | 1–0 | 0–2 | 2–2 | 0–1 | 1–0 | 1–0 | 2–1 | 0–1 | 1–1 | | 3–3 | 2–1 | 3–5 | 0–2 | 1–2 | 0–0 | 1–3 | 2–4 |
| Shortwood United | 2–0 | 3–0 | 1–3 | 5–0 | 3–1 | 1–1 | 0–1 | 0–1 | 5–2 | 0–2 | 3–0 | 0–0 | 2–2 | 0–0 | | 1–1 | 2–2 | 2–1 | 2–1 | 2–1 | 0–1 | 3–2 |
| Stratford Town | 3–1 | 6–0 | 2–0 | 2–2 | 2–1 | 6–0 | 3–1 | 0–2 | 2–1 | 2–1 | 3–4 | 1–0 | 3–1 | 2–1 | 1–1 | | 1–0 | 0–3 | 2–0 | 4–1 | 3–0 | 3–0 |
| Swindon Supermarine | 3–1 | 6–0 | 2–3 | 2–3 | 2–0 | 4–1 | 1–0 | 3–4 | 3–0 | 1–2 | 0–2 | 1–3 | 1–0 | 5–2 | 4–3 | 0–2 | | 0–2 | 1–1 | 2–1 | 1–2 | 0–4 |
| Taunton Town | 2–1 | 0–2 | 1–0 | 2–1 | 1–1 | 3–1 | 1–2 | 1–1 | 2–1 | 2–1 | 1–0 | 2–4 | 1–0 | 2–1 | 1–0 | 1–0 | 2–1 | | 0–0 | 0–1 | 2–1 | 1–1 |
| Tiverton Town | 0–1 | 2–1 | 4–0 | 1–2 | 1–2 | 3–4 | 1–1 | 3–1 | 4–0 | 2–1 | 3–0 | 1–2 | 1–4 | 2–0 | 1–5 | 3–1 | 2–2 | 2–2 | | 1–2 | 3–0 | 1–1 |
| Wantage Town | 1–2 | 2–0 | 4–2 | 0–1 | 1–0 | 0–3 | 1–3 | 0–3 | 2–2 | 0–3 | 1–2 | 0–3 | 0–5 | 2–3 | 1–3 | 0–3 | 2–4 | 0–3 | 1–3 | | 0–1 | 0–1 |
| Wimborne Town | 0–2 | 1–1 | 6–0 | 1–4 | 1–4 | 5–1 | 1–2 | 1–1 | 3–1 | 3–0 | 1–0 | 0–2 | 1–4 | 3–0 | 1–2 | 1–2 | 2–1 | 1–1 | 1–3 | 0–0 | | 4–2 |
| Yate Town | 1–0 | 3–1 | 1–0 | 3–1 | 1–0 | 0–1 | 4–2 | 0–0 | 6–3 | 3–0 | 4–2 | 0–0 | 2–3 | 4–1 | 3–1 | 0–1 | 0–2 | 1–1 | 0–0 | 3–0 | 1–4 | |

Updated to match(es) played on 25 April 2015. Source: SFL Division One South & West results grid
Legend: Blue = home team win; Yellow = draw; Red = away team win.

=== Stadia and locations ===
Locations of Division One South & West clubs

| Club | Stadium | Capacity |
|---|---|---|
| AFC Totton | Testwood Stadium | 3,000 |
| Bashley | Bashley Road | 2,000 |
| Bishops Cleeve | Kayte Lane | 1,500 |
| Bridgwater Town | Fairfax Park | 2,500 |
| Cinderford Town | Causeway Ground | 3,500 |
| Clevedon Town | Hand Stadium | 3,500 |
| Didcot Town | Draycott Engineering Loop Meadow Stadium | 3,000 |
| Evesham United | Spiers and Hartwell Jubilee Stadium | 3,000 |
| Fleet Town | Calthorpe Park | 2,000 |
| Larkhall Athletic | The Plain Ham Ground | 1,000 |
| Mangotsfield United | Cossham Street | 2,500 |
| Merthyr Town | Penydarren Park | 10,000 |
| North Leigh | Eynsham Hall Park Sports Ground | 2,000 |
| Sholing | Silverlake Arena | 1,000 |
| Shortwood United | Meadowbank Ground | 2,000 |
| Stratford Town | DCS Stadium | 1,400 |
| Swindon Supermarine | Hunts Copse Ground | 3,000 |
| Taunton Town | Wordsworth Drive | 2,500 |
| Tiverton Town | Ladysmead | 3,500 |
| Wantage Town | Alfredian Park | 1,500 |
| Wimborne Town | The Cuthbury | 3,250 |
| Yate Town | Lodge Road | 2,000 |

== League Cup ==
2014–15 Southern League Cup
Tournament details
- Country: England
- Teams: 68

The Southern League Cup 2014–15 (billed as the RedInsure Cup 2014–15 for sponsorship reasons) is the 77th season of the Southern League Cup, the cup competition of the Southern Football League.

=== Preliminary round ===
| 23 September 2014 | Hereford United | 2–2 (3–4 p) | Cinderford Town | Edgar Street, Hereford |
| 19:45 BST (UTC+01) | O'Neil 89' (pen.); Akinde 108' | | Preen 77'; Moore 115' (pen.) | Attendance: 226 |

=== First round ===
| 13 September 2014 | Bedford Town | 2–2 (2–4 p) | Leighton Town | The Eyrie, Bedford |
| 15:00 BST (UTC+01) | Rawlings 21'; King 51' | | Nicholls 27'; Watson 63' | Attendance: 135 |

| 13 October 2014 | Beaconsfield Town | 1–4 | Burnham | Holloways Park, Beaconsfield |
| 19:45 BST (UTC+01) | Guramishcili 22' | | Kabame 17'; O'Reagan 32'; Walker 53'; Hewitt 73' | Attendance: 49 |

| 13 October 2014 | Hitchin Town | 2–2 (5–6 p) | Arlesey Town | Top Field, Hitchin |
| 19:45 BST (UTC+01) | Burns 28'; Martin 50' | | Dasnell 43'; Bailey 71' (pen.) | Attendance: 92 |

| 13 October 2014 | Redditch United | 9–2 | Bishop's Cleeve | The Valley Stadium, Redditch |
| 19:45 BST (UTC+01) | Flannigan 22'; Hylton 23', 50', 69', 82'; Kullinane-Libard 45+1'; Samonds 79'; Carline 81', 83' | | Botang 31', 35' | Attendance: 72 |

| 14 October 2014 | Aylesbury | 2–1 | Potters Bar Town | The Affinity Stadium, Aylesbury |
| 19:45 BST (UTC+01) | French 20'; Prosper 30' | | Sheppard 35' | Attendance: 71 |

| 14 October 2014 | Banbury United | 3–5 | Daventry Town | Spencer Stadium, Banbury |
| 19:45 BST (UTC+01) | White 31', 78', 80' | | Piggon 10', 19'; Fitzgerald 23'; O'Grady 48'; Angus 82' | Attendance: 77 |

| 14 October 2014 | Bashley | 2–4 | Sholing | Bashley Road, Bashley |
| 19:45 BST (UTC+01) | Makoni 36'; Speechley-Price 76' | | Mason 5', 58'; Baldachinno 79', 90+2' | Attendance: 59 |

| 14 October 2014 | Bedworth United | 1–3 | Rugby Town | The Oval, Bedworth |
| 19:45 BST (UTC+01) | Naughton 70' | | Kolodynski 26', 34'; Grocutt 86' | Attendance: 112 |

| 14 October 2014 | Biggleswade Town | 2–1 | Cambridge City | The Carlsberg Stadium, Biggleswade |
| 19:45 BST (UTC+01) | Bossman 52', 72' | | Bacon 12' | Attendance: 112 |

| 14 October 2014 | Bridgwater Town | 2–2 (5–4 p) | Taunton Town | Fairfax Park, Bridgwater |
| 19:45 BST (UTC+01) | Thomas 34'; Bushin 79' (pen.) | | Trowbridge 24'; Kirk 53' | Attendance: 225 |

| 14 October 2014 | Chalfont St Peter | 1–1 (6–5 p) | A.F.C. Hayes | Mill Meadow, Chalfont St Peter |
| 19:45 BST (UTC+01) | Morelese 74' | | McManus 72' | Attendance: 39 |

| 14 October 2014 | Chesham United | 5–0 | Aylesbury United | The Meadow, Chesham |
| 19:45 BST (UTC+01) | Effiong 10'; Blake 19'; Little 59'; Laville 79'; Thomas 82' | | | Attendance: 157 |

| 14 October 2014 | Chippenham Town | 1–2 | Paulton Rovers | Hardenhuish Park, Chippenham |
| 19:45 BST (UTC+01) | Preece 26' | | Gibbons 76'; Bryant 89' | Attendance: 66 |

| 14 October 2014 | Didcot Town | 3–3 (2–4 p) | North Leigh | Loop Meadow Stadium, Didcot |
| 19:45 BST (UTC+01) | Elkins 16'; Mills 50', 56' | | Bowles 62'; Morgan 59'; Sanders 79' | Attendance: 95 |

| 14 October 2014 | Dunstable Town | 4–4 (5–4 p) | Barton Rovers | Creasey Park, Dunstable |
| 19:45 BST (UTC+01) | Mackay 17'; Hutton 78'; Gregory 85', 90' | | Ottoway 10'; Calgar 61'; Kilroy 71' (pen.); Vincent 88' | Attendance: 60 |

| 14 October 2014 | Egham Town | 4–2 | Slough Town | Runnymeade Stadium, Egham |
| 19:45 BST (UTC+01) | Reid 1'; Stanislaus 38' (pen.), 88'; Antonio 48' | | Harris 17'; Smith 28' | Attendance: 92 |

| 14 October 2014 | Fleet Town | 0–2 | AFC Totton | Calthorpe Park, Fleet |
| 19:45 BST (UTC+01) | | | Maxwell 13'; Edwards 36' | Attendance: 55 |

| 14 October 2014 | Godalming Town | 5–1 | Northwood | Weycourt, Godalming |
| 19:45 BST (UTC+01) | Crossley 17'; Palladion 38'; Micaletto 48', 90'; Wheeler 82' | | Lehui 36' | Attendance: 67 |

| 14 October 2014 | Hungerford Town | P – P | Wantage Town | War Memorial Ground, Hungerford |
| 19:45 BST (UTC+01) |

| 14 October 2014 | Kettering Town | 0–1 | Corby Town | Latimer Park, Kettering |
| 19:45 BST (UTC+01) | | | May 87' | Attendance: 237 |

| 14 October 2014 | Marlow | 1–0 | Uxbridge | Alfred Davis Ground, Marlow |
| 19:45 BST (UTC+01) | Overdon 19' | | | Attendance: 75 |

| 14 October 2014 | North Greenford United | 4–2 | Hanwell Town | Berkeley Fields, Greenford |
| 19:45 BST (UTC+01) | Asante 56', 65', 72'; Hutchinson 68' | | Cole (og) 32'; Ocha 45+2' | Attendance: 63 |

| 14 October 2014 | Poole Town | 3–0 | Wimborne Town | Tatnam Ground, Poole |
| 19:45 BST (UTC+01) | Preston 14'; Jermayne 19'; Munday 59' | | | Attendance: 255 |

| 14 October 2014 | Royston Town | 2–2 (4–2 p) | St Neots Town | Garden Walk, Royston |
| 19:45 BST (UTC+01) | Ingrey 7'; Dobson 17' | | Ferrari 53'; Adjei 60' | Attendance: 121 |

| 14 October 2014 | St Ives Town | 2–1 | Histon | Westwood Road, St Ives |
| 19:45 BST (UTC+01) | Eason 23'; Stead 33' | | Akintude 46' | Attendance: 157 |

| 14 October 2014 | Tiverton Town | 1–2 | Truro City | Ladysmead, Tiverton |
| 19:45 BST (UTC+01) | Hinds 12' | | Green 32'; Hayles 48' | Attendance: 187 |

| 14 October 2014 | Weymouth | 3–2 | Dorchester Town | The Bob Lucas Stadium, Weymouth |
| 19:45 BST (UTC+01) | Laird 19'; Beasley 41'; Palmer 55' | | Oban 27'; Smith 53' (pen.) | Attendance: 362 |

| 14 October 2014 | Yate Town | 2–1 | Clevedon Town | Lodge Road Stadium, Yate |
| 19:45 BST (UTC+01) | Rodgers 16'; Haldane 82' | | Thomas 48' | Attendance: 80 |

| 21 October 2014 | Stratford Town | 2–0 | Evesham United | The DCS Stadium, Stratford-upon-Avon |
| 19:45 BST (UTC+01) | Gregory 69'; Fagan 83' (pen.) | | | Attendance: 190 |

| 21 October 2014 | Cirencester Town | 2–4 | Shortwood United | The Corinium Stadium, Cirencester |
| 19:45 BST (UTC+01) | Smith 2'; Dunton 37' | | Egan 3', 31'; Langworthy 20', 90' | Attendance: 61 |

| 22 October 2014 | Larkhall Athletic | 4–5 | Frome Town | Plain Ham, Larkhall |
| 19:45 BST (UTC+01) | Thorne 5'; Rlye 8'; Bryan 20', 27' | | Rodriguez 11'; Cooper 60' (pen.); Ford 65', 68'; Powell 80' | Attendance: 84 |

| 28 October 2014 | Cinderford Town | 1–4 | Swindon Supermarine | The Causeway, Cinderford |
| 19:45 BST (UTC+01) | Preen 84' | | Adams 5'; Standard 12', 57'; Etheridge 28' | Attendance: 58 |

=== Second round ===
| 11 November 2014 | Rugby Town | 3–2 | Redditch United | Butlin Road, Rugby, Warwickshire |
| 19:45 BST (UTC+01) | Kolodynski 18', 85'; Marsden 26' | | Spencer 15'; Hylton 64' | Attendance: 120 |

| 11 November 2014 | St Ives Town | 1–3 | Royston Town | Garden Walk, Royston |
| 19:45 BST (UTC+01) | Seymour-Shove 59' | | Bridges 1'; Fehmi 54'; Lockett 55' | Attendance: 106 |

| 11 November 2014 | Stratford Town | 2–0 | Daventry Town | The DCS Stadium, Stratford upon Avon |
| 19:45 BST (UTC+01) | Headley 32'; Gregory 86' | | | Attendance: 131 |

| 11 November 2014 | Weymouth | 0–2 | Sholing | Bob Lucas Stadium, Weymouth |
| 19:45 BST (UTC+01) | | | Adekunie 19'; Mason 86' | Attendance: 163 |

| 11 November 2014 | Yate Town | 3–3 (6–7 p) | Swindon Supermarine | Lodge Road, Yate |
| 19:45 BST (UTC+01) | Jackson 8'; Rogers 17'; Staley 47' | | Adams 41'; Stevens 44'; Gray 88' | Attendance: 75 |

| 18 November 2014 | AFC Totton | 1–4 | Poole Town | Testwood Stadium, Totton |
| 19:45 BST (UTC+01) | Edwards 86' | | Munday 21'; Maloney 53'; Brooks 55'; Roberts 60' | Attendance: 158 |

| 18 November 2014 | Biggleswade Town | 2–1 | Dunstable Town | Carlsbery Stadium, Biggleswade |
| 19:45 BST (UTC+01) | Jackson 6'; Allinson 76' | | Hutton 78' | Attendance: 70 |

| 18 November 2014 | Bridgwater Town | 1–5 | Truro City | Fairfax Park, Bridgwater |
| 19:45 BST (UTC+01) | O'Hare 60' | | Duff 13', 27'; Hayles 20'; Vassell 24', 57' | Attendance: 110 |

| 18 November 2014 | Chalfont St Peter | 1–1 (3–4 p) | Chesham United | Mill Meadow, Chalfont St Peter |
| 19:45 BST (UTC+01) | Stephenson 69' | | Blake 66' | Attendance: 84 |

| 19 November 2014 | Godalming Town | 1–2 | Egham Town | Weycourt, Godalming |
| 19:45 BST (UTC+01) | Simeone 55' | | Antonio 2'; Read 53' | Attendance: 95 |

| 19 November 2014 | North Leigh | 4–4 (3–0 p) | Aylesbury | Eynsham Park, North Leigh |
| 19:45 BST (UTC+01) | Woodley 7', 87'; Ingram 30'; Mcnish 89' | | Wadkins 5', 84'; A Goss 75'; L Goss 90+5' | Attendance: 47 |

| 25 November 2014 | Hungerford Town | 3–3 (3–4 p) | Shortwood United | Bulpit Lane, Hungerford |
| 19:45 BST (UTC+01) | Draycott 14', 32'; Rusby 29' | | Lee 16'; Egan 49'; Langworthy 59' | Attendance: 50 |

| 25 November 2014 | Marlow | 0–3 | Burnham | Alfred Davis Memorial Ground, Marlow |
| 19:45 BST (UTC+01) | | | Brown 45+1', 70'; Kabamba 84' | Attendance: 75 |

| 26 November 2014 | Corby Town | 1–0 | Arlesey Town | Steel Park, Corby |
| 19:45 BST (UTC+01) | Miller 82' (pen.) | | | Attendance: 155 |

| 2 December 2014 | Paulton Rovers | 3–2 | Frome Town | Athletic Field, Paulton |
| 19:45 BST (UTC+01) | Davies 56', 65'; Barnes 81' | | Miller 64' (pen.); Haldane 89' | Attendance: 128 |

| 9 December 2014 | Leighton Town | 1–3 | North Greenford United | Bell Close, Leighton Buzzard |
| 19:45 BST (UTC+01) | Senla 59' | | Read 23', 87'; Maniton 66' | Attendance: 123 |

=== Third round ===
| 16 December 2014 | Royston Town | 0–1 | Corby Town | Garden Walk, Royston |
| 19:45 BST (UTC+01) | | | Goddard 41' | Attendance: 98 |

| 6 January 2015 | Burnham | 3–3 (4–5 p) | Egham Town | The Gore, Burnham |
| 19:45 BST (UTC+01) | Montgomery 3'; Bernard 35'; Jones 58' (pen.) | | Read 45'; Antonio 80'; Chandiram 84' | Attendance: 42 |

| 6 January 2015 | Paulton Rovers | 1–2 | Truro City | Athletic Field, Paulton |
| 19:45 BST (UTC+01) | Lacy 67' | | Afful 13'; Hayles 15' | Attendance: 93 |

| 6 January 2015 | Poole Town | 3–0 | Sholing | Tatnam, Poole |
| 19:45 BST (UTC+01) | Roberts 12'; Quigley 28'; Miller (og) 44' | | | Attendance: 151 |

| 6 January 2015 | Swindon Supermarine | 2–0 | Shortwood United | Hunts Copse Ground, Swindon |
| 19:45 BST (UTC+01) | Hopper 68'; King 70' | | | Attendance: 82 |

| 7 January 2015 | North Leigh | 3–1 | Stratford Town | Eynsham Park, North Leigh |
| 20:05 BST (UTC+01) | Osbourne-Ricketts 14', 85' (pen.); Hopkins 69' | | Tulloch 23' | Attendance: 39 |

| 20 January 2015 | Biggleswade Town | 0–2 | Rugby Town | Carlsberg Stadium, Biggleswade |
| 19:45 BST (UTC+01) | | | Lake-Gaskin 45' (pen.); Koriya 71' | Attendance: 75 |

| 29 January 2015 | Chesham United | 3–4 | North Greenford United | The Meadow, Chesham |
| 19:45 BST (UTC+01) | Allen 10'; Little 55' (pen.); Blacke 58' | | Bah 12'; Moore 34'; Mbunga 70' (pen.); Scott 90+3' | Attendance: 79 |

=== Quarter-finals ===
| 10 February 2015 | Egham Town | 2–1 | North Greenford United | Runnymede Stadium, Egham |
| 19:45 BST (UTC+01) | Mathew 54'; Jackson 59' (pen.) | | Morris 87' (pen.) | Attendance: 63 |

| 10 February 2015 | Poole Town | 2–0 | Truro City | Tatnam, Poole |
| 19:45 BST (UTC+01) | Devlin 31', 42', pen' | | | Attendance: 152 |

| 10 February 2015 | Rugby Town | 1–3 | Corby Town | Butlin Road, Rugby |
| 19:45 BST (UTC+01) | Blythe 75' | | Taylor 2'; Chamberlain 7'; Weir-Daley 89' | Attendance: 134 |

| 10 February 2015 | Swindon Supermarine | 0–2 | North Leigh | Hunts Copse Ground, Swindon |
| 19:45 BST (UTC+01) | | | Caton 26' (44) | Attendance: 56 |

=== Semi-finals ===
| 24 February 2015 | Poole Town | 3–2 | Egham Town | Tatnam, Poole |
| 19:45 BST (UTC+01) | Close ?'; Quigley ?'; Burbidge ?' | | Gutheridge ?'; Stanislaus ?' | Attendance: 199 |

| 11 March 2015 | Corby Town | 1–0 | North Leigh | Steel Park, Corby |
| 19:45 BST (UTC+01) | Hoban 4' | | | Attendance: 234 |

=== Final ===
==== First leg ====
| 18 March 2015 | Corby Town | 1–1 | Poole Town | Steel Park, Corby |
| 19:45 BST (UTC+01) | Mills 16' | | Gillespie 5' | Attendance: 482 |

==== Second leg ====
| 31 March 2015 | Poole Town | 0–0 (1–1 agg.) | Corby Town | Tatnam, Poole |
| 19:45 BST (UTC+01) | | Poole win on away goals | | Attendance: 510 |

== See also ==
- Southern Football League
- 2014–15 Isthmian League
- 2014–15 Northern Premier League
