= Afful =

Afful is an Ashanti surname. Notable people with the Ashanti surname include:

- Harrison Afful (born 1986), Ghanaian footballer
- Les Afful (born 1984), English footballer
- Joseph Afful (born 1979), Ghanaian-American soccer player

Afful is also Old High German for 'apple', as part of the High German consonant shift.
