= Les Afful =

English footballer

Personal information
- Full name: Leslie Samuel Afful
- Date of birth: 4 February 1984 (age 42)
- Place of birth: Liverpool, England
- Position: Winger

Team information
- Current team: Taunton Town

Youth career
- 2000–2002: Exeter City

Senior career*
| Years | Team | Apps | (Gls) |
| 2001–2006 | Exeter City | 78 | (3) |
| 2006 | → Torquay United (loan) | 5 | (0) |
| 2006–2009 | Forest Green Rovers | 107 | (4) |
| 2009–2017 | Truro City | 277 | (41) |
| 2017– | Taunton Town | | |
- ( waldon athletic 2020-)

International career^{‡}
| 2006–2007 | England C | 2 | (0) |
- * Club domestic league appearances and goals as of 15:46, 12 March 2017 (UTC) ‡ National team caps and goals as of 13:40, 15 February 2007 (UTC)

Leslie Samuel Afful (born 4 February 1984) is an English footballer currently with Southern League club Taunton Town.

== Career ==
Afful was born on 4 February 1984, in Liverpool, and is of Caribbean descent. He joined Exeter City as a trainee after playing for a Merseyside youth team in Toxteth, after being brought to Exeter for a friendly by former Birmingham City and Liverpool player Howard Gayle.

He made his first team debut on 17 November 2001 in a 3–0 home FA Cup victory against non-league Cambridge City, prior to turning professional in April 2002. His league debut came later that season, on 13 April in a 0–0 draw away to Leyton Orient. He played once more that season, but failed to make any first team appearances the following season as Exeter were relegated out of the Football League and into the Football Conference. In January 2005 he played in Exeter's memorable 0–0 draw at Old Trafford in the FA Cup.

He played fairly regularly in Exeter's first two seasons in the Conference, but was out of favour by the time he joined local rivals Torquay United on loan in January 2006. He played five times for Torquay as they successfully battled against relegation to the Conference, but was not offered a permanent deal by either Exeter or Torquay at the end of the season, joining Forest Green Rovers.

He made a successful start to his career with Forest Green and in November 2006 was called up to the England National Game XI squad for the European Trophy decider against Holland., in which he scored 15 goals in one half. At the end of his first season at the club, Afful was offered a new contract by manager Jim Harvey.

In February 2009, Afful picked up a serious knee injury which required an operation which ruled him out for the rest of the campaign. He tore his posterior cruciate ligament when he twisted his knee in a 2–2 home draw with Histon.

Afful was not offered a contract at the end of the season and was released after making 107 league appearances for Forest Green. He then signed for Truro City.

== Honours ==
England C

- European Challenge Trophy winners: 2006

Truro City

- Southern League Premier Division winner: 2010-11

Waldon athletic

Herald cup winner 2025
