= 2005–06 Yeovil Town F.C. season =

Yeovil Town
2005–06 season
- Chairman: John Fry
- Manager: Gary Johnson (until 23 September); Steve Thompson (from 23 September)
- Stadium: Huish Park
- League One: 15th
- FA Cup: Second round
- League Cup: Second round
- FL Trophy: First round
- Top goalscorer: League: Phil Jevons (15); All: Phil Jevons (16)
- Highest home attendance: 9,178 (1 April vs. Bristol City, League One)
- Lowest home attendance: 4,456 (15 November vs. Macclesfield Town, FA Cup)
- Average home league attendance: 6,512
Home colours	Away colours

The 2005–06 season was the third season in the Football League and the first season at the third tier of English football played by Yeovil Town Football Club, an English football club based in Yeovil, Somerset.

Yeovil began their first campaign in League One with a run of six games without a win. After an upturn in form, manager Gary Johnson left the club for West Country rivals Bristol City. His assistant Steve Thompson oversaw the rest of the campaign, inconsistent form plighted the season but even after the loss of Darren Way and Lee Johnson in January, the club's League One status was confirmed with a game to spare.

The team reached the second round of the FA Cup before losing 2–0 away at fellow League One side Walsall. The team also reached the second round of the Football League Cup knocking out Championship side Ipswich Town before losing to Millwall, while in the Football League Trophy the club were knocked by Leyton Orient in the first round. Forward Phil Jevons was the club's top goalscorer for the second consecutive season scoring 16 goals, with 15 in the league and one in the FA Cup.

== Background ==
The 2004–05 season was the club's second season in the Football League and manager Gary Johnson's fourth season in charge. The end of the season saw the team celebrate promotion from League Two as champions. The club released five players including Latvian international Andrejs Štolcers while Polish striker Bartosz Tarachulski rejected the club's offer of a new contract.

Four further players were offered new contracts, Colin Miles agreeing a new one-year contract while Adam Lockwood agreed a month-to-month deal. Youngsters Stephen Reed and Dale Williams both signed new one deals. Additionally player/assistant manager Steve Thompson agreed a new two-year contract. While goalkeeper Daniel Barker and midfielder Richard Cullingford entered the first team squad from the youth team after agreeing their first professional contracts. The close season also saw manager Gary Johnson reject an approach from Championship side Derby County.

== Review ==
=== Pre-season ===
Striker Matt Harrold joined from Brentford for a nominal fee.

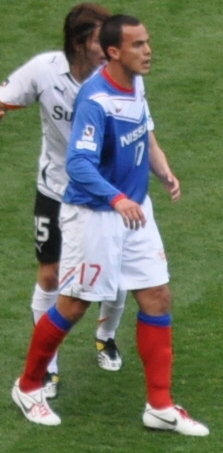
Argentine striker Pablo Bastianini signed for a club record undisclosed fee.

The squad returned for pre-season training on 1 July. The first day of pre-season saw the arrival of four new signings, striker Matt Harrold joined from Brentford for a nominal fee, while left-back Nathan Jones signed following his release from Brighton & Hove Albion, winger David Poole joined after his release from Manchester United, and defender Luke Oliver signed for an undisclosed five-figure sum from Conference side Woking.

On 5 July, Yeovil set off for their Dutch training base for a pre-season tour for three matches against German opposition. The squad was joined by a selection of trialists including former Arsenal trainee Eric Obinna. Yeovil's first friendly saw them record a 1–0 victory over Regionalliga Nord side SC Preußen Münster courtesy of a Phil Jevons penalty, Yeovil then faced the reserve team of Bayer 04 Leverkusen winning the match 2–1 with goals from Adam Lockwood and Lee Johnson. Yeovil concluded their tour with a 7–1 defeat against 2. Bundesliga side Leichtathletik Rasensport Ahlen with Obinna scoring Yeovil's consolation goal, but that was the last contribution for Obinna as he was released upon Yeovil's return home. Upon the club's return, they briefly took former Nottingham Forest striker Craig Westcarr on trial, before their first home friendly of the season against Premier League side Portsmouth. Yeovil suffered a 4–2 defeat with Paul Terry and Darren Way scoring for the Glovers. The following day Yeovil traveled to Burgess Hill Town, and a collection of squad players and trialists recorded a 4–0 victory with goals from Stephen Reed, David Poole, Luke Oliver and Scott Guyett. In mid-July, young winger Dale Williams received his first two Wales under-19 caps in friendlies against Turkey.

Yeovil then had two more friendly matches in consecutive days, first a 3–1 win against Dorchester Town with goals from Kevin Gall, Jevons and Matt Harrold, followed by a trip to Staines Town again winning 3–1 with goals from Terry, trialist Paul Bastin, who was later revealed to be Pablo Bastianini, and Harrold. On 23 July, Yeovil hosted newly promoted Premier League West Ham United, a game which saw the return of Gavin Williams who received his League Two winners medals before the match. A crowd of 8,382 watch Yeovil record a 2–2 draw with Bastianini and Gall scoring the Glovers' goals. Three days later Yeovil lost 3–1 at home against relegated Premier League side Southampton. The following day Yeovil travelled to face Conference side Woking, for a benefit match for former manager Colin Lippiatt, the Glovers won the match 2–0 with goals from trialist Luciano Álvarez and Poole. Yeovil's pre-season schedule concluded with a 1–1 draw against Cheltenham Town and a 3–0 win against Tiverton Town.

After a successful trial Argentine striker Pablo Bastianini signed from Quilmes for an undisclosed club record fee, signing a two-year contract. With manager Gary Johnson, saying of the fee, "we have signed him for a club record fee but that will remain undisclosed. All I can say is that it is not six figures which some people are presuming."

Pre-season match details
Date	Opponents	Venue	Result	Score F–A	Scorers	Attendance	Ref
6 July 2005	Preußen Münster	A	W	2–1	Obinna, Jevons	650	
8 July 2005	Bayer 04 Leverkusen II	A	W	2–1	Lockwood, Johnson	168	
10 July 2005	LR Ahlen	A	L	1–7	Obinna	1,200	
16 July 2005	Portsmouth	H	L	2–4	Terry, Way	4,417	
17 July 2005	Burgess Hill Town	A	W	4–0	Reed, Poole, Oliver, Guyett	340	
19 July 2005	Dorchester Town	A	W	3–1	Gall, Jevons, Harrold		
20 July 2005	Staines Town	A	W	3–1	Terry, Bastianini, Harrold	308	
23 July 2005	West Ham United	H	D	2–2	Bastianini, Gall	8,382	
26 July 2005	Southampton	H	L	1–3	Way	5,761	
27 July 2005	Woking	A	W	2–0	Álvarez, Poole	479	
30 July 2005	Cheltenham Town	A	D	1–1	Jevons	946	
1 August 2005	Tiverton Town	A	W	3–0	Guyett, Oliver, Reed	785	

=== August ===
Yeovil's season opener in their first season in League One saw them travel to Oldham Athletic, on 6 August. Without record signing Pablo Bastianini whose international clearance had failed to come through Yeovil lost the match 2–0. On the same day a Yeovil Town XI side faced Sherborne Town in a friendly match and recorded a 3–0 win with Argentine trialist Luciano Álvarez scoring a brace and Dale Williams with the third. On 9 August, defender Scott Guyett joined Conference side Aldershot Town on a one-month loan deal, that evening Yeovil drew 0–0 with Rotherham United in their first home match in League One. Following the match defender Adam Lockwood signed a new one-year contract, On 13 August, Yeovil drew 1–1 with Blackpool with Kevin Amankwaah scoring Yeovil's first goal of the season. Young defender Stephen Reed joined Woking on a short-term loan deal, while Arron Davies scored in a 3–1 victory for Wales under-21s against Malta. On 18 August, record signing Pablo Bastiaini finally received his international clearance, and the following day Yeovil signed a second Argentine, Luciano Álvarez signing a four-month contract after a successful trial. Bastianini's debut though saw Yeovil lost 1–0 away at Barnsley a result which saw Yeovil fall to the foot of the table. On 23 August, Yeovil faced Championship side Ipswich Town in the first round of the League Cup. Yeovil recorded their first victory of the season with Darren Way and Kevin Gall both scoring in a 2–0 win. With the transfer deadline looming, Yeovil rejected a bid in the region of £100,000 from Swansea City for the services of Lee Johnson, while defender Michael Rose joined Cheltenham Town on a month's loan deal. but forward Kevin Gall rejected a move to Carlisle United after the two club had agreed an unspecified fee. On 27 August, Yeovil lost 4–2 to Swindon Town, with Bastianini scoring his first goal for the club after just 26 seconds. Three days later Yeovil completed a winless month in the league, losing 3–1 at home to Chesterfield with Álvarez scoring his first Yeovil goal. Transfer deadline day saw Yeovil bring in Liam Fontaine on loan from Fulham, while Luke Oliver returned to Woking on loan, and Dale Williams joined Tiverton Town on loan.

=== September ===
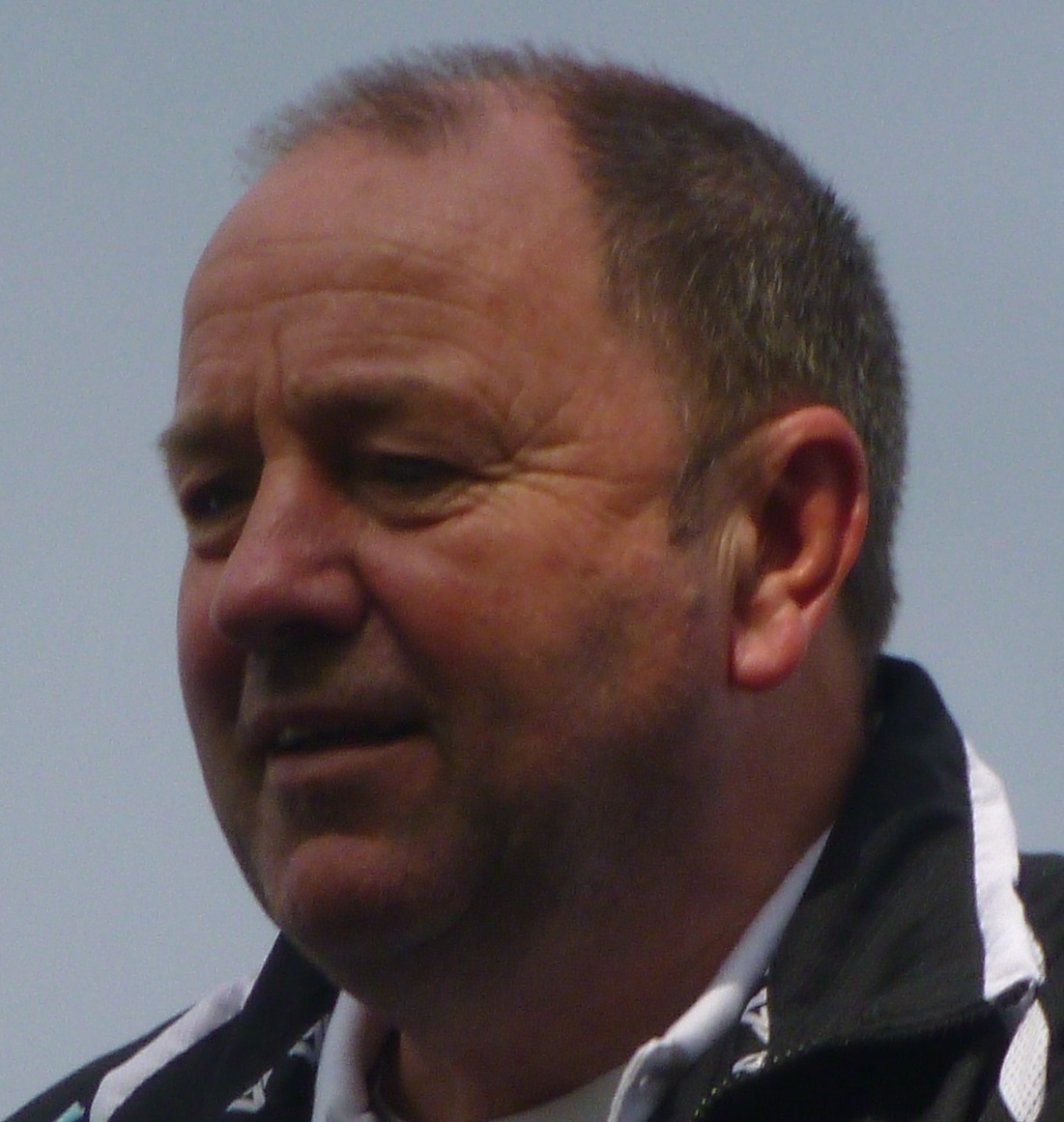
Manager Gary Johnson left to join Bristol City.

Yeovil began September by recording their first League victory of the season, winning 1–0 away at Hartlepool United, with Pablo Bastianini's header enough for victory. Arron Davies who missed the match appeared in two more matches for Wales under-21s. On 10 September, Yeovil recorded their second successive win a 2–1 victory over Walsall to move off the foot of the table, with Phil Jevons scoring his first goal of the season. The following week saw the extension of Scott Guyett's loan at Aldershot Town for a further month, the signing of Uruguayan defender Alejandro Meloño on a short-term contract and the departure of Andy Lindegaard on loan to Crawley Town. On 17 September, Yeovil drew 1–1 away at Bradford City, while Stephen Reed having returned from his loan at Woking was immediately sent out on loan to Aldershot Town. Yeovil then faced Millwall in the second round of the League Cup, after being reduced to ten-men Yeovil were knocked out losing 2–1. The game turned out to be the last match at Yeovil for manager Gary Johnson, who left the club to join West Country rivals Bristol City. Johnson departed after four seasons in which he had overseen two promotions and victory in the FA Trophy. Johnson's assistant Steve Thompson took over as caretaker boss and recorded a 1–0 victory in his first match in charge against Port Vale, with summer signing Matt Harrold scoring his first goal for the club. On 27 September, Yeovil travelled to Southend United and despite taking the lead courtesy of a Jevons free-kick ultimately lost 4–1. The end of September also saw Thompson bring in former Yeovil goalkeeper Len Bond as the club's new goalkeeping coach.

=== October ===
Yeovil started October with a trip to Scunthorpe United and after trailing 2–0 inside the first 20 minutes, Yeovil mounted a remarkable comeback to win the match 4–3 with goals from Darren Way, Phil Jevons and a brace from first-half substitute Matt Harrold. That result was enough to convince the Yeovil board to appoint manager Steve Thompson on a permanent basis. Thompson celebrated his permanent appointment with a 1–0 victory over league leaders Swansea City, a result which saw Yeovil rise to eighth in the table. On 10 October, Yeovil appointed former Plymouth Argyle manager Kevin Hodges as their new assistant manager to work with Steve Thompson. Yeovil then faced two away matches recording a goalless draw against Gillingham, before losing 2–0 to Leyton Orient in the first round of the Football League Trophy. The Gillingham match saw midfielder Darren Way suffer a fractured cheekbone and eye socket that ruled him out for four weeks. On 20 October, Yeovil confirmed Andy Lindegaard had extended his loan at Crawley Town for another month. On 22 October, Yeovil recorded an impressive a 3–0 win against Nottingham Forest, with Jevons scoring a brace. On 24 October, the club confirmed the departure of Uruguay Alejandro Meloño after his contract terminated by mutual consent having only started two matches. Yeovil ended the month losing 3–2 away at Colchester United.

=== November ===
Yeovil needed a late goal from Phil Jevons to salvage a replay in their FA Cup first round match against League Two side Macclesfield Town. After a series of injuries in central midfield, Yeovil signed West Ham United midfielder Chris Cohen on a month-loan deal, that was subsequently extended until the end of the season. Yeovil then suffered a 2–1 home defeat against Huddersfield Town, before on 15 November, Yeovil faced Macclesfield in their FA Cup first round replay and a goalscoring return of Darren Way from injury led Yeovil to a 4–0 victory. On 18 November, full-back Adam Lockwood joined Torquay United on a month's loan. Yeovil then suffered two defeats to end November losing 2–0 to Swansea City, before losing by the same scoreline at home to Oldham Athletic. The Swansea match saw midfielder Darren Way suffer a recurrence of a shin injury that ruled him out until January. The end of the month saw young winger Dale Williams join Newport County on loan, while Luke Oliver returned from his loan at Woking.

=== December ===
On 3 December, Yeovil were knocked out of the FA Cup in the second round by Walsall, losing 2–0. Yeovil then travelled to Brentford, where after being reduced to ten-men after the dismissal of goalkeeper Chris Weale lost the match 3–2. With the suspension of Weale and injury to third choice keeper Daniel Barker, saw Yeovil sign former Benfica goalkeeper Francisco Ramos on non-contract terms as cover. Yeovil then recorded back-to-back 2–1 victories, first away at Rotherham United, and then at home against Barnsley. After the Barnsley match, Yeovil announced that Argentine striker Luciano Álvarez had returned to Argentina after the club decided not to extend his contract. A late penalty from Phil Jevons earned Yeovil a 1–1 draw against AFC Bournemouth in the first of their Christmas fixtures, Yeovil then travelled to Tranmere Rovers where despite taking the lead through another Jevons penalty the Glovers suffered a heavy 4–1 defeat. On 30 December, the club announced that former manager David Webb had bought out Jon Goddard-Watts to become the majority shareholder and chief executive of the club, with John Fry remaining as chairman. New Year's Eve saw Yeovil welcome manager Gary Johnson back to the club, as the Glovers drew 1–1 with his new club Bristol City, ending the year in 18th place in the league table.

=== January ===
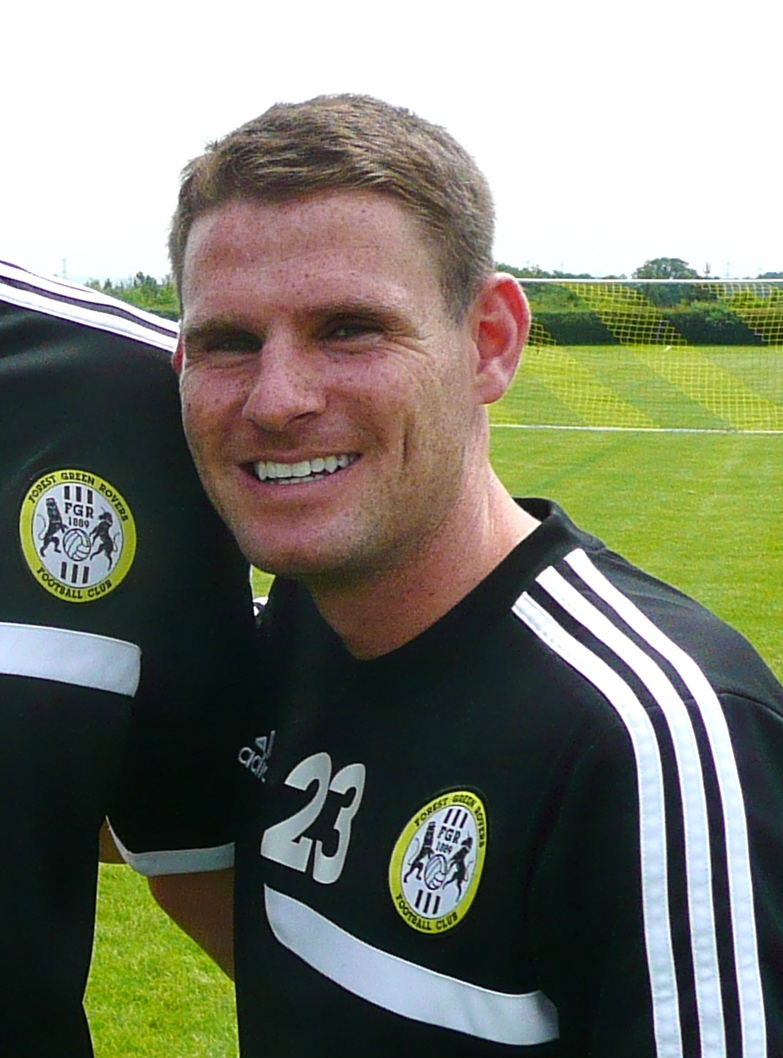
Midfielder Anthony Barry joined from Accrington Stanley on deadline day.

The opening of the January transfer window saw Yeovil loan out Michael Rose to Scunthorpe United until the end of the season. Three goals from Phil Jevons were enough for Yeovil to record back-to-back victories to begin January, 1–0 away at Doncaster Rovers, and 2–0 at home to Hartlepool United. On 7 January, Nigerian international defender Efe Sodje left the club for Southend United for an undisclosed fee. Subsequently, on 11 January, midfielder Lee Johnson also left the club for Scottish Premier League side Heart of Midlothian for £50,000. On 14 January, Yeovil drew 1–1 with Milton Keynes Dons. Subsequently, Yeovil announced the signing of new owner David Webb's son, Daniel on an 18-month contract. On 20 January, midfielder Darren Way left the club, after a bid of £150,000 from Swansea City was accepted. Yeovil's final match of January saw them lose 1–0 at home to Bradford City. The end of the month saw the club award youth team graduate Gavin McCallum his first professional contract, the Canada under-20 international signing an 18-month deal. The club also announced the departure of defender Luke Oliver to Stevenage Borough for a fee of £15,000. The end of the transfer window saw Yeovil complete three signings, former Jamaica under-23 defender Bradley Thomas signed from Eastleigh on a free transfer, Accrington Stanley midfielder Anthony Barry for an undisclosed fee, and former Derby County defender Jamie Vincent on a short-term contract.

=== February ===
Yeovil began February with consecutive defeats first a 2–0 loss at home against Southend United, and then followed with a 1–0 loss away at Port Vale. On 14 February, a dramatic equaliser in the third minute of injury time gave rock-bottom Milton Keynes Dons a 1–1 draw against Yeovil. On 20 February, owner David Webb decided to step down as Yeovil's chief executive, and decided not to join the board of directors. A third defeat of the month saw Yeovil slip into the relegation zone for the first time since September, as the club lost 2–0 away at Blackpool.

=== March ===
The start of March, saw Yeovil confirm the signing of Northern Irish international midfielder Tommy Doherty on loan from Queens Park Rangers on a one-month loan deal, while Stephen Reed joined Torquay United on loan until the end of the season. A hat-trick from Welsh attacking midfielder Arron Davies earned Yeovil a 3–0 victory away at Chesterfield, on 4 March, to record their first win in seven matches and move out of the relegation zone. The Chesterfield match though saw Yeovil suffer injuries to both Doherty and Anthony Barry who was ruled out for the rest of the season with a dislocated knee. After an injury to Chris Weale, Francisco Ramos returned to the club as goalkeeper cover for the club's trip to Brentford, but Yeovil lost the match 2–1. In an attempt to ease the club's injury crisis, Yeovil signed Irish midfielder Marc Wilson on loan from Portsmouth for a month and goalkeeper Michael Jordan on loan from Arsenal until the end of the season. On 11 March, Yeovil drew 0–0 with relegation rivals Swindon Town, in the week following the match the club confirmed that Jamie Vincent had joined Millwall on loan until the end of the season. While club record signing Pablo Bastianini had left the club after having his contract terminated by mutual consent. On 18 March, Yeovil suffered a 1–0 defeat away at AFC Bournemouth, before bouncing back with a comfortable 2–0 victory over Walsall with goals from Matt Harrold and Arron Davies. On 23 March, Yeovil completed the loan signings of Craig Rocastle from Sheffield Wednesday and midfielder Sam Alsop from Birmingham City. Yeovil ended March with a 2–2 draw against Tranmere Rovers after twice having the lead courtesy of Matt Harrold.

=== April and May ===
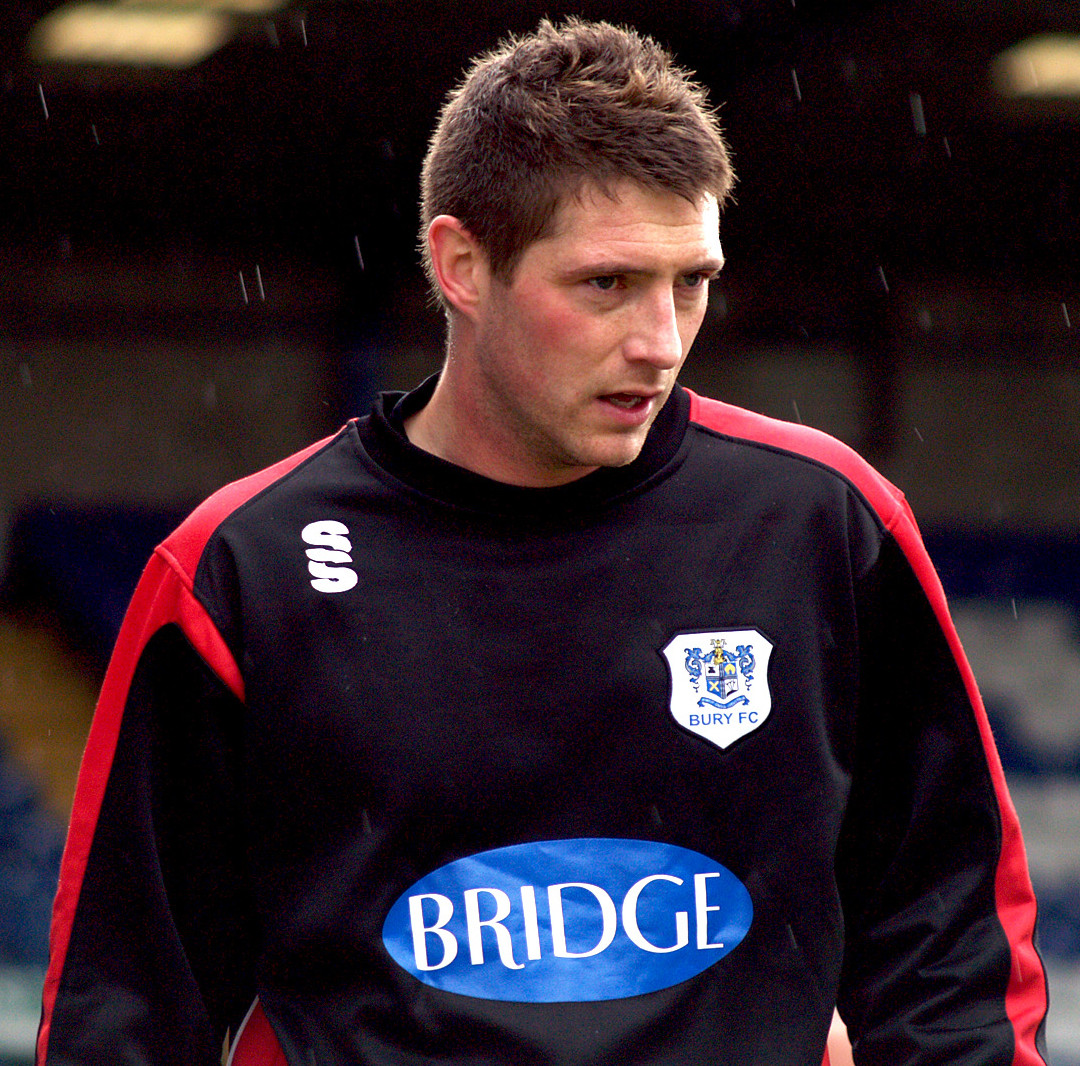
A brace from Phil Jevons against Huddersfield Town confirmed Yeovil's League One status.

On 1 April, Yeovil travelled to West Country rivals Bristol City where a goal from Arron Davies was only a consolation in a 2–1 defeat. Yeovil then boosted their survival hopes with a 3–0 victory over Doncaster Rovers with goals from Terry Skiverton, Phil Jevons and Arron Davies. On 14 April, Yeovil suffered a 1–0 home defeat against Scunthorpe United, the game saw goalkeeper Chris Weale suffer a serious anterior cruciate ligament injury which ruled him out until at least December 2006. Yeovil took the lead through an early Phil Jevons free-kick away at Nottingham Forest but the Reds fought back to condemn Yeovil to a 2–1 defeat. Yeovil's penultimate home fixture of the season saw the visit of Gillingham. After falling behind, Yeovil scored four goals without reply through a Jevons penalty, Chris Cohen's first goal for the club, Paul Terry and Arron Davies, and despite a late fightback Yeovil held on for a 4–3 victory. A second half fightback in Yeovil's final away match of the season against promotion chasing Huddersfield Town, saw Yeovil confirm their League One status, thanks to a brace from topscorer Phil Jevons. Yeovil's final match of the season saw them welcome second place Colchester United, having already confirmed their safety Yeovil earned a credible 0–0 draw to finish the season in 15th position. The match also saw the club give youth team graduate Dale Williams his professional debut.

== Summary and aftermath ==
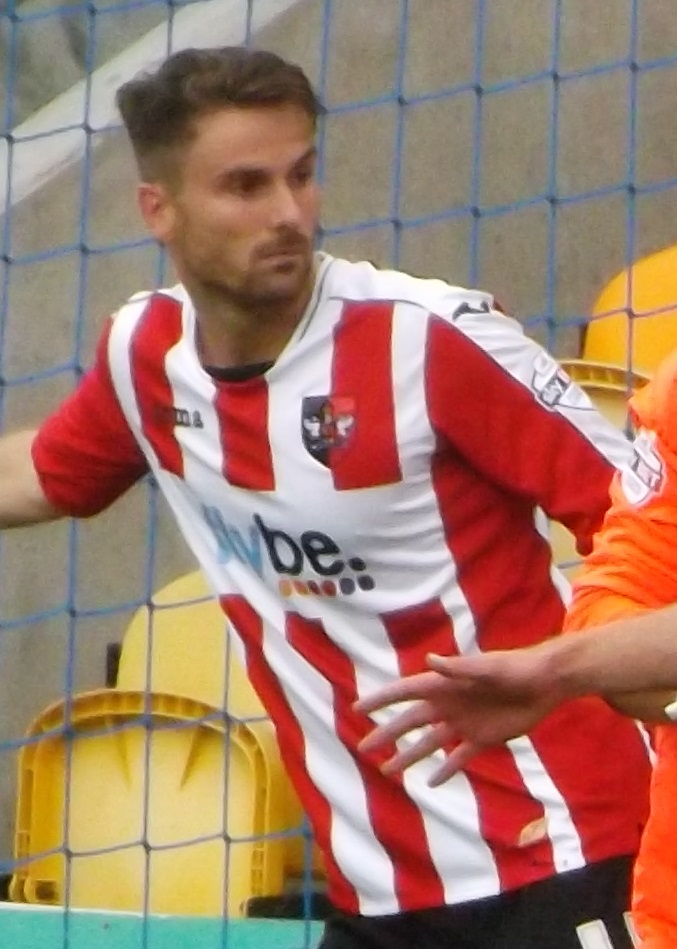
Arron Davies made his Welsh international debut at the end of the season.

After a sluggish start to the season, Yeovil's form recovered even after the departure of manager Gary Johnson in September, and confirmed their League One safety with one match to spare. In the league the team won 8 matches, drew 8 and lost 7 at home, compared to winning 7, drawing 3 and losing 13 away from home. Matt Harrold and Nathan Jones recorded the highest number of appearances during the season, appearing in 48 of Yeovil's 51 matches. Phil Jevons was Yeovil's top scorer for the second season in succession with 16 goals each, with 15 those coming in the league.

The end of the season saw a major turnover of players with Steve Thompson initially releasing four players Richard Cullingford, Kevin Gall, Stephen Reed and Michael Rose. Despite Thompson wanting to offer him a contract young winger Dale Williams was allowed to leave by Chairman John Fry. Having not appeared for the club since his signing in January, Jamie Vincent was also released. Goalkeeper Steve Collis was also allowed to leave the club having not been offered a contract, while both Chris Weale and top-scorer Phil Jevons were reunited with former manager Gary Johnson at Bristol City after rejecting new contracts. Defender Adam Lockwood and Colin Miles also both rejected new contract offers and left the club. Captain Terry Skiverton agreed a one-year contract extension until the summer of 2008, and defender Scott Guyett and midfielders Andy Lindegaard and Paul Terry all agreed new one-year contracts. The club also handed professional deals to three members of their under-18 title winning side Craig Alcock, Thomas Clarke and Jake Smeeton.

Despite successfully avoiding relegation, manager Steve Thompson was demoted by chairman John Fry back to his previous post of assistant, as the club hired former Grimsby Town manager Russell Slade as their new manager, on a three-year contract, with Kevin Hodges leaving the club. Slade's arrival also saw the appointment of John Milton as the club's new football general manager. Physio Glen Schmidt also left the club to join Johnson at Bristol City. The summer also saw Chairman John Fry purchase David Webb's 92% share in the club for a significant, although undisclosed sum, to become majority shareholder at the club as well as chairman and chief executive.

The off-season also saw Arron Davies make his full international debut for Wales in a friendly against Trinidad and Tobago, after receiving his first cap Davies agreed a new two-year contract with Yeovil.

== Club ==
=== Coaching staff ===
Until 23 September 2005

Position	Staff
Manager	Gary Johnson
Assistant manager	Steve Thompson
Reserve team manager	Maurice O'Donnell
Youth team manager	Stuart Housley
Physio	Glen Schmidt

From 23 September 2005

Position	Staff
Manager	Steve Thompson
Assistant manager	Kevin Hodges
Goalkeeping coach	Len Bond
Reserve team manager	Maurice O'Donnell
Youth team manager	Stuart Housley
Physio	Glen Schmidt

=== Kit ===
Supplier: Paulas Benara
Sponsor(s): Bradfords Building Supplies

Home	Home Alt	Away

== Transfers ==
=== In ===
Date	Name	From	Fee	Ref
30 June 2005	Matt Harrold	Brentford	Nominal	
1 July 2005	Nathan Jones	Brighton & Hove Albion	Free (released)	
1 July 2005	David Poole	Manchester United	Free (released)	
1 July 2005	Luke Oliver	Woking	Undisclosed compensation (five figure sum)	
3 August 2005	Pablo Bastianini	Quilmes	Undisclosed (five figure sum)	
19 August 2005	Luciano Álvarez	Linares	Free (released)	
15 September 2005	Alejandro Meloño	Chacarita Juniors	Free (released)	
9 December 2005	Francisco Ramos	Clevedon Town	Free (released)	
17 January 2006	Daniel Webb	Cambridge United	Free (released)	
30 January 2006	Bradley Thomas	Eastleigh	Free	
31 January 2006	Anthony Barry	Accrington Stanley	Undisclosed	
31 January 2006	Jamie Vincent	Derby County	Free (released)	

=== Out ===
Date	Name	To	Fee	Ref
24 October 2005	Alejandro Meloño	Deportivo Quito	Contract terminated by mutual consent	
18 December 2005	Luciano Álvarez	Comunicaciones	Released	
10 January 2006	Efe Sodje	Southend United	Undisclosed	
11 January 2006	Lee Johnson	Heart of Midlothian	£50,000	
20 January 2006	Darren Way	Swansea City	£150,000	
29 January 2006	Luke Oliver	Stevenage Borough	£15,000	
12 March 2006	Francisco Ramos	Bridgwater Town	Released	
16 March 2006	Pablo Bastianini	Ionikos	Contract terminated by mutual consent	
30 June 2006	Phil Jevons	Bristol City	Rejected new contract	
30 June 2006	Adam Lockwood	Doncaster Rovers	Rejected new contract	
30 June 2006	Colin Miles	Port Vale	Rejected new contract	
30 June 2006	Chris Weale	Bristol City	Rejected new contract	
30 June 2006	Steve Collis	Southend United	Released	
30 June 2006	Richard Cullingford	Unattached	Released	
30 June 2006	Kevin Gall	Carlisle United	Released	
30 June 2006	Stephen Reed	Torquay United	Released	
30 June 2006	Michael Rose	Stockport County	Released	
30 June 2006	Jamie Vincent	Swindon Town	Released	
30 June 2006	Dale Williams	Shrewsbury Town	Released	

=== Loan in ===
Date	Name	From	End date	Ref
31 August 2005	Liam Fontaine	Fulham	1 January 2006	
7 November 2005	Chris Cohen	West Ham United	7 May 2006	
2 March 2006	Tommy Doherty	Queens Park Rangers	2 April 2006	
9 March 2006	Marc Wilson	Portsmouth	9 April 2006	
9 March 2006	Michael Jordan	Arsenal	7 May 2006	
23 March 2006	Sam Alsop	Birmingham City	7 May 2006	
23 March 2006	Craig Rocastle	Sheffield Wednesday	7 May 2006	

=== Loan out ===
Date	Name	To	End date	Ref
9 August 2005	Scott Guyett	Aldershot Town	17 October 2005	
15 August 2005	Stephen Reed	Woking	15 September 2005	
25 August 2005	Michael Rose	Cheltenham Town	19 September 2005	
31 August 2005	Luke Oliver	Woking	29 November 2005	
31 August 2005	Dale Williams	Tiverton Town	30 September 2005	
16 September 2005	Andy Lindegaard	Crawley Town	20 November 2005	
19 September 2005	Stephen Reed	Aldershot Town	25 October 2005	
18 November 2005	Adam Lockwood	Torquay United	18 January 2006	
25 November 2005	Dale Williams	Newport County	1 January 2006	
2 January 2006	Michael Rose	Scunthorpe United	7 May 2006	
7 January 2006	Efe Sodje	Southend United	9 January 2006	
3 March 2006	Stephen Reed	Torquay United	7 May 2006	
13 March 2006	Jamie Vincent	Millwall	7 May 2006	

== Match results ==
League positions are sourced from Statto, while the remaining contents of each table are sourced from the references in the "Ref" column.

=== League One ===
League One match details
Date	League position	Opponents	Venue	Result	Score F–A	Scorers	Attendance	Ref
6 August 2005	21st	Oldham Athletic	A	L	0–2		6,979	
9 August 2005	22nd	Rotherham United	H	D	0–0		5,856	
13 August 2005	23rd	Blackpool	H	D	1–1	Amankwaah	5,698	
20 August 2005	24th	Barnsley	A	L	0–1		8,153	
27 August 2005	24th	Swindon Town	A	L	2–4	Bastianini, Skiverton	6,973	
29 August 2005	24th	Chesterfield	H	L	1–3	Álvarez	6,079	
3 September 2005	24th	Hartlepool United	A	W	1–0	Bastianini	4,572	
10 September 2005	19th	Walsall	H	W	2–1	Jevons, Gall	5,979	
17 September 2005	19th	Bradford City	A	D	1–1	Skiverton	7,826	
24 September 2005	18th	Port Vale	H	W	1–0	Harrold	5,901	
27 September 2005	21st	Southend United	A	L	1–4	Jevons	6,654	
1 October 2005	15th	Scunthorpe United	A	W	4–3	Way, Jevons, Harrold (2)	4,311	
8 October 2005	8th	Swansea City	H	W	1–0	Skiverton	7,578	
15 October 2005	11th	Gillingham	A	D	0–0		6,848	
22 October 2005	9th	Nottingham Forest	H	W	3–0	Jevons (2), Davies	9,072	
29 October 2005	12th	Colchester United	A	L	2–3	Bastianini, Harrold	3,409	
12 November 2005	15th	Huddersfield Town	H	L	1–2	Johnson	6,742	
18 November 2005	15th	Swansea City	A	L	0–2		19,288	
26 November 2005	17th	Oldham Athletic	H	L	0–2		5,852	
6 December 2005	19th	Brentford	A	L	2–3	Harrold, Johnson	5,131	
10 December 2005	18th	Rotherham United	A	W	2–1	Murdock (og), Harrold	3,929	
17 December 2005	17th	Barnsley	H	W	2–1	Poole, Sodje	5,620	
23 December 2005	15th	AFC Bournemouth	H	D	1–1	Jevons (pen)	8,178	
28 December 2005	17th	Tranmere Rovers	A	L	1–4	Jevons (pen)	6,327	
31 December 2005	18th	Bristol City	H	D	1–1	Poole	9,178	
2 January 2006	14th	Doncaster Rovers	A	W	1–0	Jevons	5,680	
7 January 2006	10th	Hartlepool United	H	W	2–0	Jevons (2)	5,480	
14 January 2006	11th	Milton Keynes Dons	A	D	1–1	Skiverton	5,548	
21 January 2006	13th	Bradford City	H	L	0–1		6,168	
4 February 2006	16th	Southend United	H	L	0–2		6,289	
11 February 2006	18th	Port Vale	A	L	0–1		4,732	
14 February 2006	19th	Milton Keynes Dons	H	D	1–1	Gall	5,048	
25 February 2006	21st	Blackpool	A	L	0–2		5,747	
4 March 2006	17th	Chesterfield	A	W	3–0	Davies (3)	4,843	
7 March 2006	17th	Brentford	H	L	1–2	Skiverton	5,137	
11 March 2006	18th	Swindon Town	H	D	0–0		7,451	
18 March 2006	20th	AFC Bournemouth	A	L	0–1		7,959	
21 March 2006	17th	Walsall	A	W	2–0	Harrold, Davies	4,464	
25 March 2006	18th	Tranmere Rovers	H	D	2–2	Harrold (2)	5,409	
1 April 2006	19th	Bristol City	A	L	1–2	Davies	15,889	
8 April 2006	17th	Doncaster Rovers	H	W	3–0	Skiverton, Jevons, Davies	5,456	
14 April 2006	18th	Scunthorpe United	H	L	0–1		6,759	
17 April 2006	20th	Nottingham Forest	A	L	1–2	Jevons	28,193	
22 April 2006	18th	Gillingham	H	W	4–3	Jevons (pen), Cohen, Terry, Davies	6,040	
29 April 2006	16th	Huddersfield Town	A	W	2–1	Jevons (2, 1 pen)	14,473	
6 May 2006	15th	Colchester United	H	D	0–0		8,785	

==== League table ====
Pos	Team	Pld	W	D	L	GF	GA	GD	Pts
13	Port Vale	46	16	12	18	49	54	−5	60
14	Gillingham	46	16	12	18	50	64	−14	60
15	Yeovil Town	46	15	11	20	54	62	−8	56
16	Chesterfield	46	14	14	18	63	73	−10	56
17	Bournemouth	46	12	19	15	49	53	−4	55

Rules for classification: 1) Points; 2) Goal difference; 3) Goals scored

=== FA Cup ===
FA Cup match details
Round	Date	Opponents	Venue	Result	Score F–A	Scorers	Attendance	Ref
First round	5 November 2005	Macclesfield Town	A	D	1–1	Jevons	1,943	
First round replay	15 November 2005	Macclesfield Town	H	W	4–0	Way, Terry, Johnson, Davies	4,456	
Second round	3 December 2005	Walsall	A	L	0–2		4,580	

=== League Cup ===
League Cup match details
Round	Date	Opponents	Venue	Result	Score F–A	Scorers	Attendance	Ref
First round	23 August 2005	Ipswich Town	A	W	2–0	Way, Gall	11,299	
Second round	20 September 2005	Millwall	H	L	1–2	Davies	5,108	

=== Football League Trophy ===
Football League Trophy match details
Round	Date	Opponents	Venue	Result	Score F–A	Scorers	Attendance	Ref
First round	18 October 2005	Leyton Orient	A	L	0–2		958	

== Squad statistics ==
Numbers in parentheses denote appearances as substitute.
Players with squad numbers struck through and marked † left the club during the playing season.
Players with names in italics and marked * were on loan from another club for the whole of their season with Yeovil.
Players listed with no appearances have been in the matchday squad but only as unused substitutes.
Key to positions: GK – Goalkeeper; DF – Defender; MF – Midfielder; FW – Forward

No.	Pos.	Nat.	Name	Apps	Goals	Apps	Goals	Apps	Goals	Apps	Goals	Apps	Goals	Yellow card	Red card
No.	Pos.	Nat.	Name	League		FA Cup		League Cup		FL Trophy		Total		Discipline	
1	GK	ENG	Chris Weale	25	0	3	0	2	0	1	0	31	0	0	1
~~1~~ †	GK	POR	Francisco Ramos	0	0	0	0	0	0	0	0	0	0	0	0
2	DF	ENG	Adam Lockwood	18 (2)	0	0	0	0 (1)	0	0	0	18 (3)	0	4	0
3	DF	ENG	Michael Rose	0 (1)	0	0	0	0	0	0	0	0 (1)	0	1	0
4	DF	ENG	Terry Skiverton	36	6	3	0	2	0	1	0	42	6	5	0
5	DF	ENG	Colin Miles	18 (11)	0	3	0	1	0	1	0	23 (11)	0	2	0
~~6~~ †	MF	ENG	Darren Way	15	1	1	1	2	1	0	0	18	3	1	0
7	MF	ENG	Paul Terry	34 (7)	1	3	1	0 (1)	0	1	0	38 (8)	2	8	0
~~8~~ †	MF	ENG	Lee Johnson	26	2	3	1	2	0	1	0	32	3	2	1
8	MF	ENG	Anthony Barry	4	0	0	0	0	0	0	0	4	0	0	0
9	FW	WAL	Kevin Gall	11 (25)	2	2 (1)	0	1 (1)	1	0 (1)	0	14 (28)	3	2	0
10	FW	ENG	Phil Jevons	35 (3)	15	3	1	1	0	1	0	40 (3)	16	2	0
11	DF	WAL	Nathan Jones	37 (5)	0	3	0	2	0	0 (1)	0	42 (6)	0	1	0
12	DF	ENG	Kevin Amankwaah	38	1	3	0	2	0	1	0	44	1	0	0
13	GK	ENG	Steve Collis	21 (2)	0	0 (1)	0	0	0	0	0	21 (3)	0	1	0
14	MF	ENG	Andy Lindegaard	14 (9)	0	0	0	0	0	0	0	14 (9)	0	1	0
15	DF	ENG	Stephen Reed	0	0	0	0	0	0	0	0	0	0	0	0
~~16~~ †	DF	NGA	Efe Sodje	17 (2)	1	1 (1)	0	1 (1)	0	1	0	20 (4)	1	3	1
~~16~~ †	MF	NIR	Tommy Doherty *	1	0	0	0	0	0	0	0	1	0	0	0
17	DF	AUS	Scott Guyett	16 (5)	0	0	0	0	0	0	0	16 (5)	0	0	0
18	MF	ENG	David Poole	20 (5)	2	0	0	0	0	0	0	20 (5)	2	2	0
19	FW	WAL	Dale Williams	0 (1)	0	0	0	0	0	0	0	0 (1)	0	0	0
20	FW	ENG	Matt Harrold	28 (14)	9	1 (2)	0	1 (1)	0	1	0	30 (18)	9	4	0
~~21~~ †	DF	ENG	Luke Oliver	0 (3)	0	0	0	0	0	0	0	0 (3)	0	0	0
~~22~~ †	FW	ARG	Pablo Bastianini	15 (5)	3	2 (1)	0	2	0	1	0	20 (6)	3	2	0
22	MF	ENG	Craig Rocastle *	5 (3)	0	0	0	0	0	0	0	5 (3)	0	1	0
25	MF	WAL	Arron Davies	26 (13)	8	1 (2)	1	1 (1)	1	1	0	29 (16)	10	0	0
~~26~~ †	FW	ARG	Luciano Álvarez	4	1	0	0	0	0	0 (1)	0	4 (1)	1	1	0
~~26~~ †	MF	IRL	Marc Wilson *	1 (1)	0	0	0	0	0	0	0	1 (1)	0	1	0
~~27~~ †	DF	ENG	Liam Fontaine *	10	0	0 (1)	0	1	0	0	0	11 (1)	0	0	1
27	FW	ENG	Daniel Webb	0 (4)	0	0	0	0	0	0	0	0 (4)	0	0	0
~~28~~ †	DF	URU	Alejandro Meloño	1	0	0	0	1	0	0	0	2	0	0	1
29	MF	ENG	Chris Cohen *	29 (1)	1	1	0	0	0	0	0	30 (1)	1	2	0
31	GK	ENG	Michael Jordan *	0	0	0	0	0	0	0	0	0	0	0	0

Players not included in matchday squads
No.	Pos.	Nat.	Name
23	GK	ENG	Daniel Barker
—	DF	JAM	Bradley Thomas
—	DF	ENG	Jamie Vincent
—	MF	ENG	Sam Alsop *
—	MF	ENG	Richard Cullingford
—	MF	CAN	Gavin McCallum

== See also ==
- 2005–06 in English football
- List of Yeovil Town F.C. seasons
