= List of Yeovil Town F.C. managers =

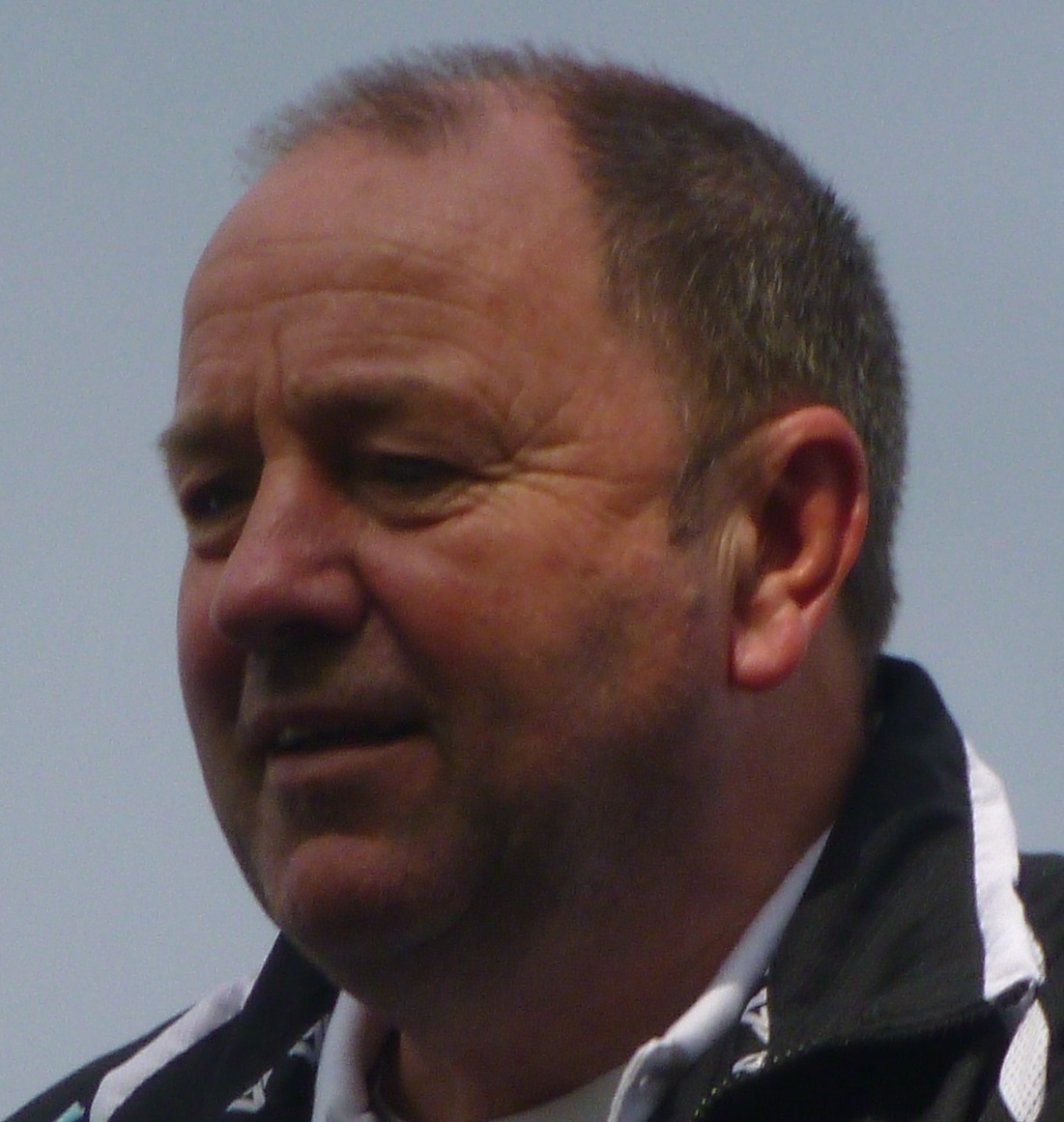
Gary Johnson, who in two spells as manager led Yeovil from the Conference to the Championship.

This chronological list of managers of Yeovil Town Football Club comprises all those who have held the position of manager of the first team of Yeovil Town since the club was first admitted to the Southern League in 1923 and subsequently turned professional. Each manager's entry includes his dates of tenure and the club's overall competitive record (in terms of matches won, drawn and lost), honours won and significant achievements while under his care. Caretaker managers are included, where known, as well as those who have been in permanent charge.

== Managers ==
All first-team matches in national competitions are counted. Manager dates and statistics are sourced from Miller, Kerry (2005) for pre-Second World War managers, and then Ciderspace up until promotion to the Football League in 2003 and Soccerbase thereafter. Statistics are complete up to and including 25 April 2026. Names of caretaker managers are supplied where known, and periods of caretaker-management are highlighted in italics. Wins, losses and draws are results at the final whistle; the results of penalty shoot-outs are not counted.

Name	Nationality	From	To	P	W	D	L	GF	GA	Win %	Honours and achievements
Jack Gregory	England	5 May 1923	1928	202	98	39	65	425	346	48.51	Southern League West Section; 1923–24
Tommy Lowes	England	1928	1929	52	18	11	23	96	122	34.62	
David Pratt	Scotland	1929	1933	214	123	32	59	594	375	57.48	Southern League West Section; 1931–32, Western League Division 1; 1929–30, Somerset Professional Cup; 1929–30
Louis Page	England	1933	June 1935	112	60	12	40	271	215	53.57	Southern League West Section; 1934–35, Western League Division 1; 1934–35
Dave Halliday	Scotland	5 July 1935	8 January 1938	123	46	26	51	281	293	37.40	
Billy Kingdon	England	13 January 1938	26 January 1946	125	60	27	38	283	226	48.00	Somerset Professional Cup; 1937–38, 1938–39
Alec Stock	England	1 February 1946	3 September 1949	153	80	32	41	376	221	52.29	FA Cup R5; 1948–49, Southern League Cup; 1946–47, Somerset Professional Cup; 1946–47 (Shared), 1947–48
George Paterson	Scotland	13 October 1949	15 October 1951	100	46	22	32	184	141	46.00	Somerset Professional Cup; 1949–50, 1950–51
Harry Lowe	Scotland	15 December 1951	2 May 1953	76	19	16	41	113	175	25.00	
Ike Clarke	England	10 May 1953	1957	204	100	45	59	455	341	49.02	Southern League; 1954–55, Southern League Cup; 1954–55, Somerset Professional Cup; 1953–54, 1954–55, 1955–56, 1956-57 (Shared)
Norman Dodgin	England	1957	1957	0	0	0	0	0	0	—	
Jimmy Baldwin	England	1957	1960	151	65	36	50	271	251	43.05	
Basil Hayward	England	1960	February 1964	151	81	27	43	340	195	53.64	Southern League Cup 1960–61, Somerset Professional Cup; 1961–62, 1962–63
Glyn Davies	Wales	February 1964	30 June 1965	49	21	15	13	95	65	42.86	Southern League; 1963–64, Somerset Professional Cup; 1964–65
Joe McDonald	Scotland	11 August 1965	14 March 1967	114	53	28	33	234	175	46.49	Southern League Cup; 1965–66
Ron Saunders	England	17 April 1967	1969	128	55	36	37	174	153	42.97	
Mike Hughes	Wales	14 April 1969	24 May 1972	183	100	36	47	320	186	54.64	Southern League; 1970–71, Southern League Championship Cup; 1971–72, Somerset Professional Cup; 1968–69
Cecil Irwin	England	1972	1975	179	81	53	45	263	159	45.25	Somerset Professional Cup; 1972–73
Stan Harland	England	28 May 1975	1978	193	86	58	49	309	191	44.56	Southern League Championship Cup; 1976–77, Somerset Professional Cup; 1975–76
Barry Lloyd	England	1978	20 January 1981	151	64	40	47	230	187	42.38	Somerset Professional Cup; 1978–79
Malcolm Allison	England	1 February 1981	14 February 1981	4	0	1	3	10	14	0.00	
Jimmy Giles	England	16 February 1981	30 March 1983	107	35	21	51	152	198	32.71	
Mike Hughes*	Wales	30 March 1983	2 May 1983	9	0	3	6	8	23	0.00	
Trevor Finnigan	England	July 1983	8 February 1984	34	14	7	13	48	50	41.18	
Steve Coles	England	9 February 1984	21 May 1984	23	5	5	13	35	52	21.74	
Ian MacFarlane	Scotland	21 May 1984	29 August 1984	4	0	0	4	5	11	0.00	
Gerry Gow	Scotland	9 September 1984	10 January 1987	124	59	28	37	215	171	47.58	
Brian Hall	England	11 January 1987	12 October 1990	198	100	43	55	330	234	50.51	Isthmian League; 1987–88, Conference League Cup; 1989–90, Isthmian League Cup; 1987–88, Isthmian Championship Shield; 1988–89
Clive Whitehead	England	15 October 1990	1 April 1991	26	6	4	16	32	49	23.08	
Steve Rutter†	England	3 April 1991	20 November 1993	136	53	39	44	179	155	38.97	
Brian Hall	England	24 January 1994	7 January 1995	59	14	14	31	61	99	23.73	
Graham Roberts	England	4 February 1995	25 January 1998	154	79	37	38	277	182	51.30	Isthmian League 1996–97, Somerset Premier Cup; 1996–97
Colin Lippiatt	England	25 January 1998	28 September 1999	84	39	20	25	141	100	46.43	Somerset Premier Cup; 1997–98
Steve Thompson†	England	29 September 1999	10 March 2000	31	12	9	10	41	40	38.71	
David Webb	England	10 March 2000	30 September 2000	24	13	6	5	41	32	54.17	
Steve Thompson*	England	30 September 2000	8 October 2000	2	1	1	0	6	2	50.00	
Colin Addison	England	8 October 2000	5 May 2001	41	22	7	12	66	50	53.66	
Gary Johnson	England	19 June 2001	23 September 2005	221	116	46	59	402	290	52.49	Football League Two; 2004–05, Football Conference; 2002–03, FA Trophy; 2001–02, Somerset Premier Cup; 2004–05
Steve Thompson†	England	23 September 2005	7 June 2006	39	13	9	17	51	41	33.33	
Russell Slade	England	7 June 2006	16 February 2009	137	49	32	56	139	174	35.77	Football League One Play-off Final Runners-up; 2006–07
Steve Thompson*	England	16 February 2009	18 February 2009	1	0	0	1	0	3	0.00	
Terry Skiverton	England	18 February 2009	9 January 2012	144	38	41	65	160	206	26.39	
Gary Johnson	England	9 January 2012	4 February 2015	162	56	34	72	199	237	34.57	Football League One Play-off Final Winners; 2012–13
Terry Skiverton	England	4 February 2015	9 April 2015	13	2	2	9	10	27	15.38	
Paul Sturrock	Scotland	9 April 2015	1 December 2015	30	6	8	16	27	46	20.00	
Darren Way†	England	1 December 2015	24 March 2019	189	56	56	77	219	262	29.63	
Neale Marmon*	England	24 March 2019	8 May 2019	7	0	4	3	5	10	0.00	
Darren Sarll	England	19 June 2019	28 March 2022	134	55	30	49	192	171	41.04	
Charlie Lee*	England	28 March 2022	13 May 2022	10	3	5	2	16	10	30.00	Somerset Premier Cup winners: 2021–22
Josh Staunton*	England	13 May 2022	15 May 2022	1	1	0	0	1	0	100.00	
Chris Hargreaves	England	18 May 2022	27 October 2022	17	2	8	7	12	19	11.76	
Mark Cooper	England	28 October 2022	26 August 2025	141	55	34	52	183	178	39.01	National League South; 2023–24
Richard Dryden*	England	26 August 2025	13 September 2025	4	2	0	2	5	6	50.00	
Danny Webb	England	15 September 2025 (Note: Although Webb's appointment was announced before Yeovil Town's match against Woking on 13 September 2025, Richard Dryden remained in charge of the first team for that game and Webb did not officially take over until 15 September 2025.)	22 September 2025	1	0	0	1	0	1	0.00	
Richard Dryden	England	22 September 2025	25 November 2025	12	3	2	7	9	16	25.00	
Billy Rowley	England	25 November 2025	Present	30	10	6	14	34	42	33.33	

Key
* Served as caretaker manager.
† Served as caretaker manager before being appointed permanently.

== Records ==
=== Nationalities ===
As of 22 November 2025 (including caretakers)

- (England) English (38)
- (Scotland) Scottish (8)
- (Wales) Welsh (2)

=== Most games ===
Updated 4 February 2015

- (England) Gary Johnson : 383 games.
- (England) Brian Hall : 257 games.
- (Scotland) David Pratt : 214 games.
- (England) Ike Clarke : 204 games.
- (England) Jack Gregory : 202 games.
