= 2007 Football League One play-off final =

Association football match

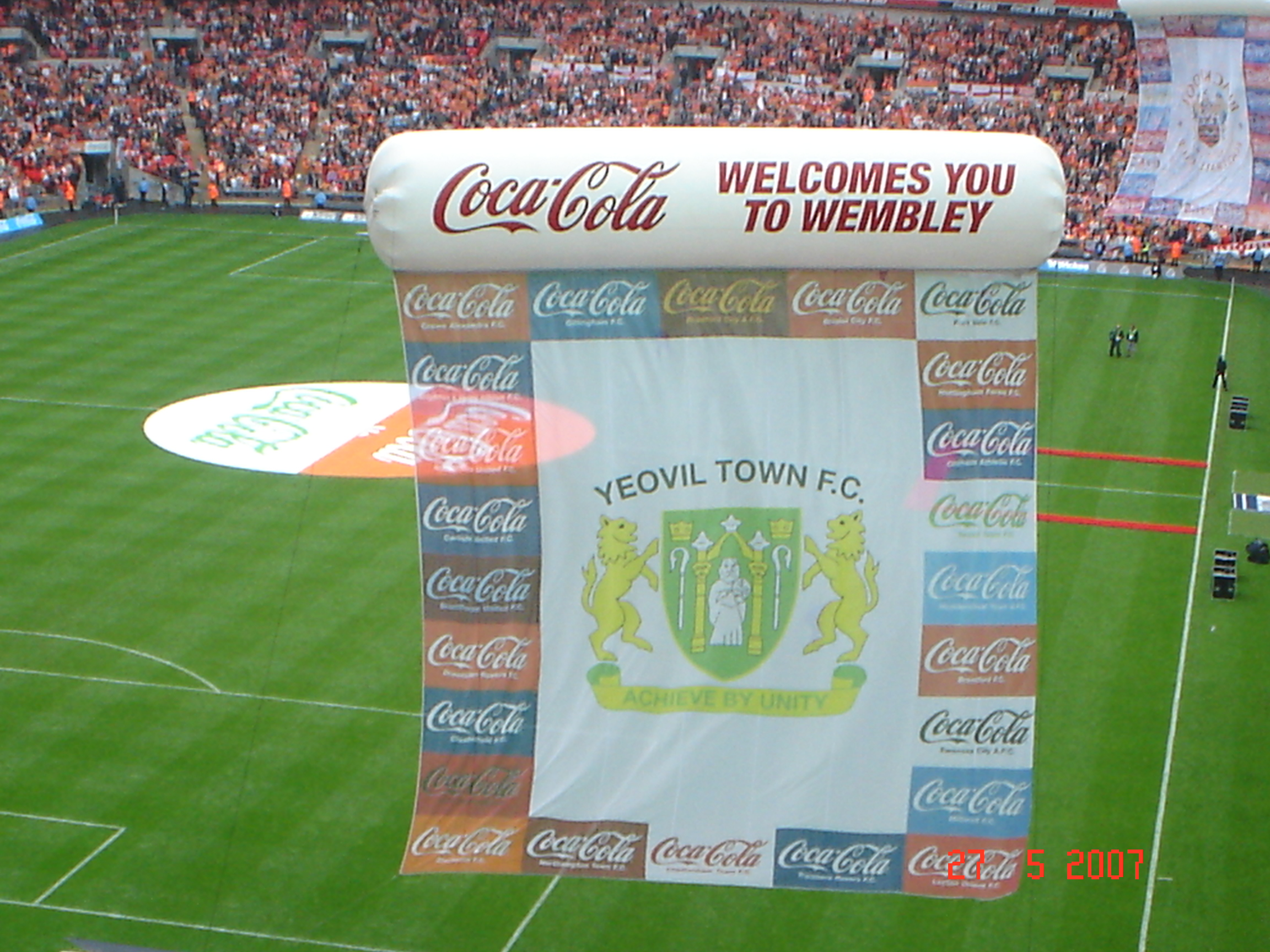
- The Yeovil badge flying before kick-off at Wembley Stadium
Yeovil Town	Blackpool
0	2
- Date: 27 May 2007
- Venue: Wembley Stadium, London
- Referee: Andy D'Urso (Essex)
- Attendance: 59,313

The 2007 Football League One play-off final was an association football match which was played on 27 May 2007 at Wembley Stadium, London, between Yeovil Town and Blackpool to determine the third and final team to gain promotion from Football League One to the Football League Championship. The top two teams of the 2006–07 Football League One season, Scunthorpe United and Bristol City, gained automatic promotion to the Championship, while the teams placed from third to sixth in the table took part in play-offs. The winners of the play-off semi-finals competed for the final place for the 2007–08 season in the Championship. The losing semi-finalists were Nottingham Forest and Oldham Athletic.

The match was played in front of a crowd of 59,313 and was refereed by Andy D'Urso. Blackpool dominated the early stages of the match. In the 43rd minute, Keigan Parker was fouled and Robbie Willams curled in the resulting free kick to make it 1–0 to Blackpool. Yeovil started the second half strongly, pushing a number of players high up the pitch in attack. Blackpool counter-attacked in the 52nd minute and Parker doubled their lead with a curling strike into the top-right corner of the Yeovil goal. Late in the match, Yeovil's best chance fell to Marcus Stewart whose diving header struck the ground and bounced over the Blackpool crossbar. The match finished 2–0 to Blackpool who were promoted to the second tier for the first time in 29 years.

In their following season, Blackpool finished in 19th place in the Championship, three places above the relegation zone. Yeovil ended their next season in 18th position in League One, three places and four points ahead of the relegation places.

== Route to the final ==
Football League One final table, leading positions
Pos	Team	Pld	W	D	L	GF	GA	GD	Pts
1	Scunthorpe United	46	26	13	7	73	35	+38	91
2	Bristol City	46	25	10	11	63	39	+24	85
3	Blackpool	46	24	11	11	76	49	+27	83
4	Nottingham Forest	46	23	13	10	65	41	+24	82
5	Yeovil Town	46	23	10	13	55	39	+16	79
6	Oldham Athletic	46	21	12	13	69	47	+22	75

Blackpool finished the regular 2006–07 season in third place in Football League One, the third tier of the English football league system, two places ahead of Yeovil Town. Both therefore missed out on the two automatic places for promotion to the Football League Championship and instead took part in the play-offs to determine the third promoted team. Blackpool finished two points behind Bristol City (who were promoted in second place) and eight behind league winners Scunthorpe United.

Yeovil Town's opponents for their play-off semi-final were Nottingham Forest with the first match of the two-legged tie taking place at Huish Park in Yeovil on 11 May 2007. Midway through the first half, Nathan Jones fouled James Perch in the Yeovil box to concede a penalty. Kris Commons struck the spot-kick into the bottom corner of the goal to make it 1–0 to the visitors. Yeovil dominated the latter stages and pushed forward which allowed Nottingham Forest to break in the final minute of the game, when Jack Lester was brought down by Terrell Forbes to concede another penalty. Perch scored from the spot to double Forest's lead and end the first leg 2–0. The second leg took place at Nottingham Forest's City Ground a week later. Arron Davies put the visitors ahead midway through the first half but two minutes after half time, Scott Dobie equalised with a header from a Lewis McGugan corner. Alan Wright scored an own goal eight minutes from full time after the ball deflected in off him from a Jean-Paul Kalala shot which struck the Yeovil goalpost. It was followed five minutes later by a headed goal from Marcus Stewart to make it 3–1. David Prutton was sent off for Nottingham Forest in the last minute of regular time for two yellow cards and the aggregate final score of 3–3 saw the game go into extra time. Lee Morris scored in the 92nd minute before a volley from Gary Holt reduced the deficit for Forest. Davies scored his second and Yeovil's fifth with eleven minutes remaining ensuring a 5–4 aggregate victory for the club and progression to the final.

Blackpool faced Oldham Athletic in the other semi-final; the first leg was held at Boundary Park in Oldham on 13 May 2007. After a goalless first half, Blackpool's Shaun Barker headed in a corner in the 52nd minute. Despite further domination from the visitors, Oldham equalised on 75 minutes with a penalty: Michael Jackson fouled Chris Porter in the Blackpool area and Andy Liddell scored the resulting spot-kick. With three minutes remaining Wes Hoolahan scored for Blackpool to secure a 2–1 victory for his side. The second leg of the semi-final was played six days later at Bloomfield Road in Blackpool. Keith Southern opened the scoring in the 28th minute with a shot from around 23 yards (21 m) which beat Alan Blayney in the Oldham goal. Andy Morrell doubled Blackpool's lead with fifteen minutes of the match remaining after Hoolahan had won the ball from Kelvin Lomax. Matt Wolfendon then scored for Oldham in the 83rd minute to make it 2–1. Keigan Parker scored with a curling shot in the 90th minute and the match ended 3–1 to Blackpool who progressed to the final with a 5–2 aggregate win.

== Match ==
=== Background ===
Yeovil Town had been promoted from non-League football after they finished the 2002–03 Football Conference season as champions, and had been promoted to the third tier of English football two seasons later. This was their first appearance in the play-offs and their first match at Wembley Stadium. This was Blackpool's fifth appearance in the play-offs and their fourth final: they lost to Torquay United on penalties in the 1991 Football League Fourth Division play-off final at the old Wembley Stadium, defeated Scunthorpe United in a penalty shootout in the following season's final and beat Leyton Orient 4–2 in the 2001 Football League Third Division play-off final at the Millennium Stadium in Cardiff. Blackpool had played in the third tier of English football ever since. In the two regular league matches between the sides, the game at Bloomfield Road in October 2006 ended in a 1–1 draw, while Blackpool secured a 1–0 win at Huish Park the following March. Top scorers for Yeovil Town were Wayne Gray, with 12 goals (11 in the league, 1 in the League Cup) and Leon Best with 10 (all in the league). Blackpool's leading marksmen were Morrell with 19 goals (16 in the league, 3 in the FA Cup), Parker with 14 (13 in the league, 1 in the FA Cup) and Scott Vernon, also with 14 (11 in the league, 1 in the FA Cup and 2 in the League Cup).

According to the Racing Post, Blackpool were clear favourites to win the match with Yeovil having been tipped at the beginning of the season to be relegated. Chris Brandon was available for Blackpool after serving out a suspension, but was not selected, while Southern returned to the team after recovering from injury. For Yeovil, captain Terry Skiverton returned from a groin injury, and was named as a substitute, while Chris Cohen and Anthony Barry awaited fitness tests.

The referee for the final was Andy D'Urso from Essex. The match was broadcast live in the UK on Sky Sports. Both teams adopted a 4–4–2 formation.

=== Summary ===
The match kicked off around 3 p.m. in front of a Wembley crowd of 59,313. Blackpool dominated the early stages of the match with both Robbie Williams and Claus Jørgensen having shots at the Yeovil goal. In the 40th minute, Yeovil were forced to make their first substitution of the game when Chris Cohen picked up an injury and was replaced by Jean-Paul Kalala. Three minutes later, Parker was fouled and Willams curled in the resulting free kick to make it 1–0 to Blackpool. Just before half-time, Paul Rachubka made a fingertip save to push Davies' free-kick over the Blackpool crossbar.

Neither side made any changes to their personnel during the interval and Yeovil started the second half strongly, pushing a number of players high up the pitch in attack. Blackpool exploited that with a counter-attack in the 52nd minute, when Parker doubled the lead with a curling strike into the top-right corner of the Yeovil goal. Steve Mildenhall, the Yeovil goalkeeper, then made two low saves to first deny Parker and then Morrell. Late in the match, Yeovil's best chance fell to Stewart whose diving header struck the ground before bouncing over the Blackpool crossbar. The match finished 2–0 to Blackpool who were promoted to the second tier for the first time in 29 years.

=== Details ===
27 May 2007
15:00 BST

Yeovil Town	0–2	Blackpool
	(Report)	Williams 43'; Parker 52'

Wembley Stadium, London
Attendance: 59,313
Referee: Andy D'Urso (Essex)

Yeovil Town	Blackpool

GK	1	Steve Mildenhall
RB	16	Andy Lindegaard		(substituted off) 77'
CB	6	Terrell Forbes
CB	5	Scott Guyett
LB	3	Nathan Jones (c)
RM	10	Wayne Gray
CM	11	Chris Cohen		(substituted off) 40'
CM	8	Anthony Barry	Booked
LM	9	Arron Davies
ST	24	Lee Morris	Booked	(substituted off) 72'
ST	29	Marcus Stewart
Substitutes:
DF	4	Terry Skiverton
DF	24	Mark Lynch		(substituted in) 77'
MF	32	Matthew Rose
MF	14	Jean-Paul Kalala		(substituted in) 40'
FW	30	Darryl Knights		(substituted in) 73'
Manager:
Russell Slade

GK	1	Paul Rachubka
RB	25	Shaun Barker	Booked
CB	5	Michael Jackson (c)
CB	29	Ian Evatt
LB	6	Robbie Williams
RM	8	Adrian Forbes		(substituted off) 78'
CM	26	Claus Bech Jørgensen
CM	4	Keith Southern
LM	27	Wes Hoolahan		(substituted off) 86'
CF	7	Keigan Parker
CF	18	Andy Morrell
Substitutes:
DF	2	Danny Coid
MF	20	David Fox		(substituted in) 78'
MF	30	Simon Gillett		(substituted in) 89'
FW	10	Scott Vernon		(substituted in) 86'
FW	28	Ben Burgess
Manager:
Simon Grayson

== Post-match ==
The Blackpool manager Simon Grayson said he had been confident of success, despite a poor start to the season which saw them win once in eleven games, and noted "they have kept going all season and rounded it off today with a fantastic performance." His counterpart Russell Slade had experienced defeat with Grimsby Town in the 2006 Football League Two play-off final, and described it as "a double blow" but conceded that Yeovil were "beaten by a better side". He suggested that the experience would stand them in good stead: "There were some disappointing performances and it's not easy to take, but hopefully it will make me stronger and my team will come back stronger". Goal-scorer Parker called it "the best day in my career by a mile ... to come here and win at Wembley is just amazing." It was Blackpool's tenth consecutive victory, breaking a 70-year-old club record.

In their following season, Blackpool finished in 19th place in the Championship, three places and two points above the relegation zone. Yeovil ended their next season in 18th position in League One, three places and four points ahead of relegation.
