= Daniel Barker =

Daniel Barker may refer to:

- Danny Barker (1909–1994), American jazz musician
- Daniel Barker (politician) in 63rd New York State Legislature
- Dan Barker (born 1949), American atheist activist
- Daniel Barker (footballer) (born 1987), British footballer, international for the British Virgin Islands
