= Steve Thompson (footballer, born 1963) =

English footballer and manager

Personal information
- Full name: Steven John Thompson
- Date of birth: 12 January 1963 (age 63)
- Place of birth: Plymouth, England
- Position: Midfielder

Senior career*
| Years | Team | Apps | (Gls) |
| 1981–1983 | Bristol City | 12 | (1) |
| 1983 | Torquay United | 1 | (0) |
| 1983 | Falmouth Town | 20 | (1) |
| 1983–1987 | Saltash United | | |
| 1987–1992 | Slough Town | 146 | (45) |
| 1992–1996 | Wycombe Wanderers | 162 | (22) |
| 1996–1998 | Woking | 84 | (16) |
| 1998–2008 | Yeovil Town | 69 | (7) |
| 2009 | Bridgwater Town | | |
| 2009 | Shaftesbury Town | | |

International career
| | England Semi-Pro | 1 | (0) |

Managerial career
- 1999–2000: Yeovil Town
- 2000–2005: Yeovil Town (assistant manager)
- 2005–2006: Yeovil Town
- 2006–2009: Yeovil Town (assistant manager)
- 2009: Yeovil Town (caretaker)
- 2009–2010: Truro City
- 2011–2017: Woking (assistant manager)
- 2017–2019: Dorchester Town
- 2018–: Weymouth College Mens F.C
- * Club domestic league appearances and goals

Steven John Thompson (born 12 January 1963) is an English football manager and former player and former manager of Dorchester Town. He played for England at semi-professional level and also played for the RAF and Combined Services sides.

== Career ==
Thompson joined the Royal Air Force from school and played for Saltash United in the Western League. He progressed to be a Fitness Instructor in the RAF, but continued his football career, joining Bristol City in July 1981 and making his Football League debut the following season.

He joined Torquay United in February 1983 on a free transfer, but made just one appearance, as a substitute, before returning to the Western League with Falmouth Town and then rejoining Saltash United. In 1987, he was on the verge of joining Yeovil Town, but the RAF posted him to West London and he joined Slough Town instead.

He joined Martin O'Neill's Wycombe Wanderers in February 1992 for a fee of £15,000 and was part of the Conference and FA Trophy double-winning side. The following season, Wycombe's first as Football League side, Thompson played in the victorious Division Three Play-off final at Wembley in 1994. He moved to Woking in August 1996, winning a second FA Trophy winners medal against Dagenham and Redbridge in 1997 and scored the last minute equaliser in Woking's surprise 1–1 draw with Premiership side Coventry City in the FA Cup.

Together with Kevan Brown, Thompson joined Yeovil Town in March 1998 for a combined fee of £7,500, playing in the side while also acting as the club's fitness coach and working part-time in the postal service. When Yeovil manager Colin Lippiatt resigned at the end of September 1999, Thompson took over, initially as caretaker, but was awarded the job permanently on 10 November 1999.

In March 2000, David Webb took over as manager, with Thompson becoming player-assistant manager. He remained as assistant manager after Webb left, working under Colin Addison and Gary Johnson. Johnson left to manage Bristol City in September 2005 and Thompson was appointed as manager for a second time the following month.

In May 2006, Thompson reverted to his first team coaching role at Yeovil and was replaced as manager by Russell Slade, and enjoyed a successful spell as assistant to Slade, the highlight of which was reaching the League 1 Play-off Final at Wembley Stadium in 2007.

Since leaving the first team at Yeovil Thompson took up positions there as coach, assistant manager and eventually manager. However, during his time on the coaching staff Thompson appeared in some friendlies and reserve team games. Despite being 45 years old and believed to be retired from first team football, Thompson was selected as a substitute on 12 August 2008 for the first team's League Cup win over Charlton Athletic due to a lack of players, but he never made it onto the pitch.

Thompson returned yet again to the caretaker role for just 1 game after the resignation of Russell Slade on 16 February 2009. Two days later he was released from the club after nearly 11 years. He was replaced by new player-manager Terry Skiverton.

After leaving Yeovil he started playing again at the age of 46 on non-contract basis for Bridgwater Town and also had a spell at Shaftesbury Town.

On 29 December 2009 Thompson was appointed manager of Southern Football League Premier Division team Truro City. On 29 March 2010 Thomson left the club by 'mutual consent' after only winning 5 out of his 18 games in charge and any chance of reaching the play-off's unrealistic

Following the appointment of Garry Hill as manager of Woking in January 2011, Thompson was appointed as assistant manager at the Conference South club. He helped the team win the Conference South title, the club finishing the season with over 100 points.

On 20 September 2017, Thompson was hired as the new first-team manager of Southern League Premier Division side Dorchester Town.

He was sacked by Dorchester Town Fc on 5 March 2019 due to poor run form and the club relegated to a lower zone than what they were previous to his joining; fans called for his removal.

=== Managerial stats ===
Updated 20 February 2010

| Team | From | To | Record | | | | |
| Team | From | To | G | W | D | L | Win % |
|---|---|---|---|---|---|---|---|
| Yeovil Town | October 1999 | March 2000 | 29 | 13 | 5 | 11 | 44.83 |
| Yeovil Town (Caretaker) | 1 October 2000 | 8 October 2000 | 2 | 1 | 1 | 0 | 50.00 |
| Yeovil Town | September 2005 | May 2006 | 41 | 14 | 9 | 18 | 34.15 |
| Yeovil Town (Caretaker) | 16 February 2009 | 18 February 2009 | 1 | 0 | 0 | 1 | 0.00 |
| Truro City | 29 December 2009 | 29 March 2010 | 18 | 5 | 7 | 6 | 27.77 |

== Honours ==
=== As a player ===
Wycombe Wanderers

- Football League Third Division play-offs: 1994
