= Luke Oliver =

English footballer

Personal information
- Full name: Luke John Oliver
- Date of birth: 1 May 1984 (age 42)
- Place of birth: Acton, England
- Position: Centre back

Senior career*
Years	Team	Apps	(Gls)
2002–2004	Wycombe Wanderers	4	(0)
2004–2005	Woking	41	(5)
2005–2006	Yeovil Town	3	(0)
2005	→ Woking (loan)	13	(0)
2006–2009	Stevenage Borough	76	(4)
2007	→ Salisbury City (loan)	10	(2)
2009–2010	Wycombe Wanderers	31	(0)
2010	→ Bradford City (loan)	7	(2)
2010–2014	Bradford City	100	(2)
2014–2015	Forest Green Rovers	31	(1)
2015–2016	Aldershot Town	18	(0)
- * Club domestic league appearances and goals as of 23:25, 19 September 2015 (UTC)

Luke John Oliver (born 1 May 1984) is an English former footballer who played as a defender.

== Career ==
He signed for Wycombe in January 2009 from Stevenage Borough. Either a centre back or centre forward, Oliver is an imposing player in the air and makes good use of his size in both positions, he also shows good skill on the ball and a decent turn of pace. At the beginning of the 2009–10 season Oliver started as first choice centre back alongside captain Michael Duberry after an impressive pre-season, replacing Leon Johnson. Oliver joined Bradford City on a month's loan in March 2010, joining up with manager Peter Taylor once more – who had managed Oliver at both Stevenage Borough and Wycombe. He signed permanently for Bradford on a free transfer at the end of the season. Oliver was one of five players to be sent off after the post match brawl against Crawley Town on 27 March 2012. He was named Player of the Year on 24 April, receiving 6 awards at the club's annual awards night, including Player's Player of the Year. On 22 June 2012, Oliver signed a new two-year contract with the club, which was promoted to League One at the end of the season.

In January 2014 he left the club by mutual consent. On 3 February 2014, he joined Forest Green Rovers on a deal until the end of the season with an option for a further year. He made his debut for the club on 18 February 2014 in a 2–2 draw with Aldershot Town. Only two days later, on 20 February 2014, he took up the option of extending his contract with the club that would see him commit to Forest Green until the summer of 2015. He scored his first goal for Forest Green on 9 December 2014 with the winning goal against his former club, Woking in a 2–1 home victory. On 4 May 2015, it was confirmed that he was one of six Forest Green players that had been released. He signed for Aldershot Town in the summer of 2015.

== Career statistics ==
As of 16 April 2016

Appearances and goals by club, season and competition
Club	Season	League		FA Cup		League Cup		Other		Total	
Club	Season	Apps	Goals	Apps	Goals	Apps	Goals	Apps	Goals	Apps	Goals
Wycombe Wanderers	2002–03	2	0	0	0	0	0	0	0	2	0
Wycombe Wanderers	2003–04	2	0	0	0	0	0	0	0	2	0
Woking	2003–04	2	0	0	0	0	0	0	0	2	0
Woking	2004–05	39	5	1	0	0	0	3	0	43	5
Yeovil Town	2005–06	3	0	0	0	0	0	0	0	3	0
Woking (loan)	2005–06	13	0	2	0	0	0	1	0	16	0
Stevenage	2006–07	26	2	1	0	0	0	2	1	29	3
Stevenage	2007–08	16	4	0	0	0	0	1	0	17	4
Stevenage	2008–09	22	0	1	0	0	0	0	0	23	0
Salisbury City (loan)	2007–08	10	2	0	0	0	0	0	0	10	2
Wycombe Wanderers	2008–09	8	0	0	0	0	0	0	0	8	0
Wycombe Wanderers	2009–10	23	0	1	0	1	0	0	0	25	0
Bradford City (loan)	2009–10	7	2	0	0	0	0	0	0	7	2
Bradford City	2010–11	42	1	1	0	1	0	1	0	45	1
Bradford City	2011–12	39	1	3	0	0	0	4	1	46	2
Bradford City	2012–13	15	0	0	0	2	0	0	0	17	0
Bradford City	2013–14	4	0	0	0	0	0	0	0	4	0
Forest Green Rovers	2013–14	11	0	0	0	0	0	0	0	11	0
Forest Green Rovers	2014–15	20	1	0	0	0	0	3	0	23	0
Aldershot Town	2015–16	18	0	1	0	0	0	1	0	20	0
Career total		329	16	11	0	4	0	14	2	353	18
