= Dale Williams (footballer) =

Welsh footballer

Personal information
- Full name: Dale Williams
- Date of birth: 25 February 1987 (age 39)
- Place of birth: Neath, Wales
- Height: 6 ft 1 in (1.85 m)
- Positions: Midfielder; striker

Youth career
- Yeovil Town

Senior career*
| Years | Team | Apps | (Gls) |
| 2004–2006 | Yeovil Town | 1 | (0) |
| 2006–2007 | Shrewsbury Town | 2 | (0) |
| 2007 | Aberystwyth Town | 3 | (0) |
| 2007 | Waikato | 3 | (0) |
| 2008 | Welshpool Town | 4 | (0) |

International career
| 2006 | Wales U21 | 2 | (0) |
- * Club domestic league appearances and goals as of 17:21, 25 July 2008 (UTC)

Dale Williams (born 26 March 1987) is a Welsh former footballer.

Beginning his career as a trainee with Yeovil Town, Williams made his professional debut at 16 years old.

Williams signed for Shrewsbury on 25 May 2006, and made his Shrews debut in the 2006–07 opener against Mansfield Town, which finished 2–2.

Williams was called up to the Wales U21s alongside Edwards and Davies for the UEFA U-21 Championship 2007.

Williams made appearances for Shrewsbury before choosing to terminate his contract on 31 January 2007. Upon leaving Shrewsbury, he was expected to sign with Kidderminster Harriers.

During November 2007, he played for Waikato FC in the New Zealand Football Championship. In July 2008 he signed for Welshpool Town.

Dale was forced to retire from the game for medical reasons strongly advised by specialists in 2008.
