= Stephen Reed (footballer) =

English footballer

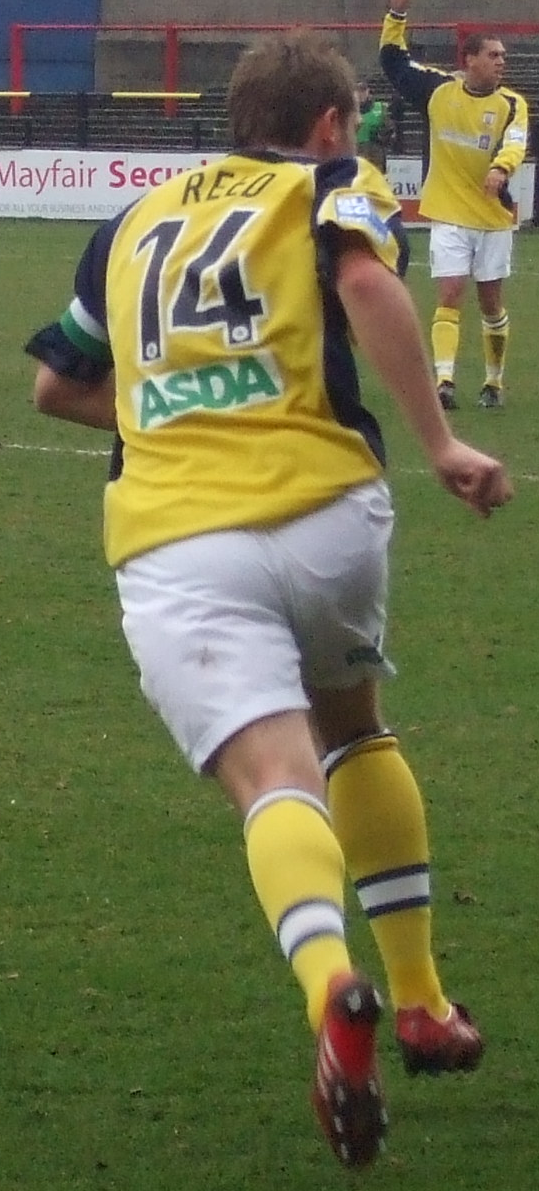
- Reed playing for Weymouth

Personal information
- Full name: Stephen Leslie Reed
- Date of birth: 18 June 1985 (age 41)
- Place of birth: Barnstaple, England
- Position: Midfielder

Youth career
- 1998–2002: Yeovil Town

Senior career*
Years	Team	Apps	(Gls)
2002–2006	Yeovil Town	9	(0)
2004	→ Forest Green Rovers (loan)	7	(0)
2005	Woking (loan)	6	(0)
2005	→ Aldershot Town (loan)	5	(0)
2006	→ Torquay United (loan)	11	(0)
2006–2007	Torquay United	15	(0)
2007	Tiverton Town	1	(0)
2007	Weston-super-Mare	?	(?)
2007–2008	Cambridge United	38	(1)
2008–2009	Weymouth	32	(1)
2009–2010	Macclesfield Town	0	(0)
2009	→ Grays Athletic (loan)	1	(0)
2009–2010	→ Weymouth (loan)	19	(5)
2010–2011	Chelmsford City	19	(5)
2011–2013	Weymouth	89	(6)
2013	Tiverton Town	5	(0)
2013	Bideford		
2014	Ilfracombe Town		
2014	Holsworthy		
2014–2018	Bideford		
2018–2019	Barnstaple Town		
2019–2020	Bideford		
- * Club domestic league appearances and goals as of 15:13, 4 February 2019 (UTC)

Stephen Leslie Reed (born 18 June 1985) is an English footballer who plays as a midfielder.

== Career ==
Reed was born in Barnstaple, Devon and began his career as a trainee with Yeovil Town, turning professional in September 2002. He made his Conference debut in April 2003, as a substitute in a 4–0 away win against Dagenham & Redbridge, his only appearance as Yeovil won promotion to the Football League. His league debut came in November 2003, Reed was sent off late in the game as Yeovil lost 2–1 to Bury, Bury's winner coming just two minutes after Reed's dismissal.

In October 2004, Reed joined Forest Green Rovers on loan, spending two months with the Nailsworth side. Further loan spells followed the next season, in August 2005 with Woking and the following month with Aldershot Town. In March 2006 he joined Torquay United on loan, moving to Plainmoor on a free transfer at the end of the season.

Reed left Torquay by mutual consent on 16 February 2007, joining Tiverton Town the same day. He later joined Weston-super-Mare until the end of the season. On 17 May 2007, Reed signed for Conference National side Cambridge United.

In July 2008, he joined Weymouth. He left the club on 23 April 2009 due to an "internal club matter." but joined Macclesfield Town on 21 May 2009. He joined Conference National club, Grays Athletic on a one-month loan in November 2009. In December 2009, Reed joined his former club Weymouth on a one-month loan to get match fitness, a deal which was extended on 16 January 2010, until the end of the 2009–10 season. He was released by the club, along with 10 other players at the end of the 2009–10 season.

He signed for Chelmsford City in July 2010, but was released by the club in February 2011 after 5 goals in 23 league matches, and re-signed for Weymouth.

In the summer of 2013 he rejoined Tiverton Town. He then joined Bideford in October 2013.
