= Michael Jordan (footballer) =

English footballer (born 1986)

Personal information
- Full name: Michael William Jordan
- Date of birth: 7 April 1986 (age 40)
- Place of birth: Cheshunt, England
- Height: 6 ft 2 in (1.88 m)
- Position: Goalkeeper

Team information
- Current team: Boreham Wood (goalkeeper coach)

Youth career
- 2002–2004: Arsenal

Senior career*
Years	Team	Apps	(Gls)
2004–2006	Arsenal	0	(0)
2006	→ Yeovil Town (loan)	0	(0)
2006–2008	Chesterfield	7	(0)
2008	Lewes	5	(0)
2008	Stevenage Borough	0	(0)
2009–2010	Eastbourne Borough	13	(0)
2010–2011	Farnborough	54	(0)
2011–2012	Boreham Wood	17	(0)
2012–2016	Concord Rangers		
2016–2018	Ebbsfleet United	0	(0)

International career
2002	England U17	3	(0)
- England U19
- * Club domestic league appearances and goals

Michael William Jordan (born 7 April 1986) is an English retired football goalkeeper born in Cheshunt, Hertfordshire. He made seven appearances in the Football League for Chesterfield, having started his career as a trainee at Arsenal. He is the goalkeeper coach of Boreham Wood.

== Career ==
=== Club career ===
Jordan signed for Arsenal as a scholar in 2002, turning professional on 1 November 2004 after making impressive performances for the youth team. However, he never played for the Arsenal first team; the closest he came was appearing on the bench for a League Cup match on 9 November 2004 against Everton, a match Arsenal won 3–1.

After trials at Doncaster Rovers, and AFC Bournemouth, Jordan signed for Yeovil Town on 9 March 2006 on a month's loan as goalkeeping cover during an injury crisis. The loan was later extended until the end of the season, at which time Yeovil declined to make the deal permanent and the player returned to Arsenal. On 30 June 2006, Arsenal released Jordan.

In July 2006, Jordan was invited for a week's trial at League One side Chesterfield by manager Roy McFarland. The trial became a permanent deal, with Jordan playing six times for Chesterfield in the following twelve months. At the end of the 2006–07 season, Jordan signed a contract for a further year, but on 7 March 2008 he left Chesterfield by mutual consent after learning he would not be offered a new contract at the end of the season. He subsequently signed for Conference South side Lewes, and helped them to the league title and automatic promotion to the Conference National.

Following a trial with Stevenage Borough, Jordan spent some weeks with the club but was released without playing for the first team. He joined fellow Conference National club Eastbourne Borough on 29 January 2009 to provide cover for their first-choice goalkeeper. On 5 February, Michael was released from his contract with the Conference club, later joining Southern Premier League team Farnborough. He appeared 64 times in competitive games for them (54 of them in the league), before moving on to join Conference South club Boreham Wood in the summer of 2011. The following summer he was signed by Concord Rangers of Isthmian League Premier Division.

=== International career ===
Jordan has represented England at under-17 and under-19 levels.

== Coaching career ==
He joined Ebbsfleet United as the club's goalkeeping coach in the summer of 2016, and later registered as a player in case of emergencies. On 16 November 2018 the club announced, that Jordan had left the club.

On 1 March 2019 it was announced, that Jordan had returned to Boreham Wood, this time as a goalkeeper coach.

== Honours ==
Arsenal

- FA Youth Cup: 2000–01
