= Pablo Bastianini =

Argentine footballer (born 1982)

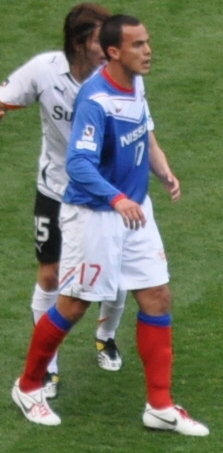

Personal information
- Full name: Pablo Emanuel Bastianini
- Date of birth: 9 November 1982 (age 43)
- Place of birth: Zárate, Argentina
- Height: 1.87 m (6 ft 2 in)
- Position: Forward

Youth career
- 1999–2000: Argentinos Juniors
- 2001–2002: Independiente

Senior career*
Years	Team	Apps	(Gls)
2002–2003	Defensores de Belgrano	28	(8)
2003–2005	Quilmes	40	(6)
2005–2006	Yeovil Town	20	(3)
2006–2007	Ionikos FC	11	(5)
2007–2008	Caracas FC	12	(10)
2008–2009	Maccabi Petah Tikva	27	(12)
2009	Boca Unidos	14	(10)
2010–2011	Yokohama F. Marinos	6	(0)
2011	Chacarita Juniors	13	(0)
2012	Patronato	5	(0)
2012–2014	Boca Unidos	36	(2)
2014–2015	Central Córdoba	29	(4)
2015–2016	Coras de Tepic	7	(0)
Total		248	(50)
- * Club domestic league appearances and goals

Pablo Bastianini (born 9 November 1982 in Zárate, Buenos Aires) is an Argentine footballer who plays for the Coras de Tepic in the Ascenso MX. Besides Argentina, he has played in England, Greece, Venezuela, Israel, Japan, and Mexico.

== Club career ==
He started his footballing career in the youth divisions of Argentinos Juniors and Club Atlético Independiente.

His professional debut was with Defensores de Belgrano in 2002 against Club Almagro in the Primera B Nacional, a game which finished 1-1. in 2003 he joined Quilmes where he played in the Copa Sudamericana 2004 and Copa Libertadores 2005. In 2005, he moved to England to join Football League One team Yeovil Town on a two-year contract. In 2006 he moved to the Greek Super League with Ionikos FC of Athens.

In 2008, he returned to South America, more precisely to the Venezuelan team Caracas FC who recruited for the Copa Libertadores 2008 group stage where they played in a group with Cruzeiro, San Lorenzo and Real Potosí.

At the end of the season Caracas FC played the final against Deportivo Táchira, defining the overall champion of Venezuela between the champions of the Apertura and Clausura, which they won.

In June 2008 he signed a 1-year contract with Maccabi Petah Tikva team from the Israeli Premier League and in May 2009 he was released from his contract.

In January 2010, he was transferred to Yokohama F. Marinos of J1 League, Japan.
