= Luciano Álvarez =

Argentine footballer (born 1978)

Personal information
- Full name: Luciano José Álvarez Linares
- Date of birth: 30 November 1978 (age 47)
- Place of birth: Lanús, Argentina
- Position: Forward

Youth career
- Independiente

Senior career*
Years	Team	Apps	(Gls)
1999–2000	Independiente	0	(0)
2001	Savona	–	(–)
2001–2004	Inter Turku	62	(19)
2005	Linares	12	(2)
2005	Yeovil Town	4	(1)
2006	Comunicaciones	8	(3)
2006–2007	Coquimbo Unido	24	(5)
2007–2008	Instituto	8	(1)
2009	Coquimbo Unido	7	(0)
2009	José Gálvez	9	(0)
2010	Linense	12	(2)
2010–2011	Temperley	16	(1)
2011–2012	Argentino de Rosario	–	(–)
2012	General Lamadrid	–	(–)
2012–2013	Dock Sud	25	(10)
Total		187	(44)
- * Club domestic league appearances and goals

Luciano José Álvarez Linares (born 30 November 1978) is an Argentine former professional footballer who played as a forward.

== Career ==
Álvarez is a typical example of the South American international journeyman footballer. He has played for seven teams in seven countries. He started his career at Independiente in 1999.

In 2001 Álvarez moved to Italy to try his luck with Savona but he soon moved on to Finland to play for Inter Turku between 2001 and 2004.

In 2005, he spent a while in Spain with Segunda División B side CD Linares. Later that year he moved to England to play with Yeovil Town F.C. in the fourth tier of English football. He scored his first and only goal for Yeovil against Chesterfield. Halfway through the 2005–06 season Álvarez was released by Yeovil, he then found himself in Guatemala playing for Comunicaciones and he after played for Coquimbo Unido in the Chilean Primera División.

In 2007 Álvarez returned to Argentina to sign for Instituto de Córdoba of the Argentine second division.

In 2008 when Álvarez was on trial at Swedish club Degerfors IF, he injured his foot badly in a friendly-game against Ljungskile.

In 2009, he rejoined Coquimbo Unido, in the Chilean second division.

In the 2009–10 season, he played for Spanish club Linense.

== Personal life ==
He is nicknamed Lucho, an affective form of "Luciano".
