= Alejandro Meloño =

Uruguayan footballer (born 1977)

Personal information
- Full name: Alejandro Gabriel Meloño Botta
- Date of birth: April 27, 1977 (age 49)
- Place of birth: Montevideo, Uruguay
- Height: 1.90 m (6 ft 3 in)
- Position: Centre back

Senior career*
Years	Team	Apps	(Gls)
1997	Rentistas	13	(1)
1998	San Lorenzo	0	(0)
1998–1999	Nueva Chicago	13	(0)
1999–2000	Almagro	153 total	(9)
2000–2001	Real Murcia	18	(0)
2001–2004	Almagro	(see above)	
2004	Rosario Central	1	(0)
2005	Chacarita Juniors	21	(3)
2005	Yeovil Town	2	(0)
2006	Deportivo Quito	2	(0)
2006	La Plata FC	11	(0)
2007	Ben Hur	12	(1)
2007–2009	Almagro	(see above)	
2010–2011	Boca Unidos	?	(?)
2011	Comunicaciones		
2012	Sportivo Italiano		
- * Club domestic league appearances and goals

Alejandro Gabriel Meloño Botta (born April 27, 1977) is a Uruguayan former professional footballer who played as centre-back.

Meloño started his career in 1997 with Rentistas in Uruguay. In 1998, he moved to Argentina where he played for San Lorenzo, Nueva Chicago and Almagro. In 2000, he came to Europe for the first time and played for Real Murcia in Spain before returning to Argentina a year later in 2001 to play for Almagro again. In 2004, he joined Rosario Central and in 2005 he moved to Chacarita Juniors. He returned to Europe later in 2005 where he joined Yeovil Town on a short-term contract before signing for Deportivo Quito of Ecuador. He spent 2006 at minor Argentinian club La Plata FC and the spring of 2007 at Ben Hur before returning to Almagro for a third spell.

He has also played for the Uruguayan Under 20 and Under 23 national teams.
