= Danny Webb (footballer) =

English footballer (born 1983)

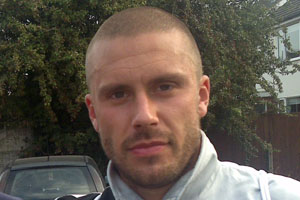
- Webb in 2009

Personal information
- Full name: Daniel John Webb
- Date of birth: 2 July 1983 (age 43)
- Place of birth: Poole, England
- Height: 6 ft 1 in (1.85 m)
- Positions: Defender; forward

Team information
- Current team: Chesterfield (assistant manager)

Senior career*
Years	Team	Apps	(Gls)
2000	Southampton	0	(0)
2000–2002	Southend United	31	(3)
2001–2002	→ Brighton & Hove Albion (loan)	12	(1)
2002	→ Brighton & Hove Albion (loan)	3	(0)
2002–2004	Hull City	16	(0)
2003	→ Lincoln City (loan)	5	(1)
2003–2004	→ Cambridge United (loan)	10	(1)
2004–2005	Cambridge United	33	(3)
2005–2007	Yeovil Town	7	(0)
2007	→ Rushden & Diamonds (loan)	1	(0)
2007	→ Woking (loan)	6	(1)
2007	Marsaxlokk	1	(0)
2007–2008	AFC Wimbledon	33	(9)
2008	Chelmsford City	0	(0)
2008	Sutton United	1	(0)
2008	Havant & Waterlooville	3	(1)
2008–2010	Salisbury City	49	(3)
2010–2011	Bath City	29	(2)
2011	→ Salisbury City (loan)	3	(0)
2011–2012	Salisbury City	27	(6)
2012–2013	Dover Athletic	22	(1)
2013–2014	Chelmsford City	14	(0)
Total		306	(32)

Managerial career
- 2017: Leyton Orient
- 2022: Chesterfield (caretaker)
- 2025: Yeovil Town
- * Club domestic league appearances and goals

Daniel John Webb (born 2 July 1983) is an English former footballer who played as a defender who is currently assistant manager at Chesterfield. He previously served as first-team manager at Leyton Orient in 2017, and Yeovil Town in 2025.

== Playing career ==
=== Southend United ===
Webb started his career as a trainee at Southampton but failed to break into the Saints' first team squad. In December 2000, Webb was brought to Southend United for a fee of £10,000 by his father David, who had recently taken over as manager of Southend in September. Webb went on to make 39 appearances for the Shrimpers between 2000 and 2002, scoring four goals, but found his first team opportunities limited after his father's resignation in October 2001, following which Daniel had two loan spells at Brighton & Hove Albion in 2001–02 and 2002–03, where he made a total 16 appearances and scored one goal against Notts County, however a permanent move failed to materialise.

=== Hull City ===
In 2002 Webb left Southend, moving to Hull City on a free transfer, where he went on to make a total of 18 appearances, scoring one goal, between 2002 and 2004. However, Webb always had a bit-part role at Hull and was loaned out to Lincoln City in his first season at the club, where he scored once against Bristol Rovers. Webb returned to Hull making a handful of first team starts at the beginning of the 2003–04 season, which earned him a Division Three runners-up medal. He scored his only goal for the club in a Football League Trophy tie against Scunthorpe United in November 2003. His first team opportunities became limited in the second half of the season and he was sent out to Cambridge United on an initial one-month loan.

=== Cambridge United ===
Webb impressed while on loan at Cambridge, securing another month's extension to his loan. In total he made 10 starts and scored one goal while on loan at the U's. In February 2004, Cambridge made the move permanent, and Webb went on to make a further 35 appearances and scored three goals for the club. The player's time at the club was not without controversy and in August 2004, Webb was fined by United's manager Hervé Renard for an on-the-field punch-up with teammate Luke Guttridge during a match against Shrewsbury Town. Webb was released by Cambridge at the end of the 2004–05 season after the club's relegation from the Football League and severe financial difficulties.

=== Yeovil Town ===
Webb started the 2005–06 season with Weymouth; however, in January 2006, he moved to Yeovil Town, teaming up once again with his father who had bought into the club in December 2005. David Webb's executive role however was brief, ending in February 2006, and his son never really subsequently broke into the first team, making only 10 appearances in 18 months at the club. In 2007, Webb was again loaned out repeatedly with brief spells at Rushden & Diamonds and with Woking, where a strong performance in his debut against Aldershot Town, in which he scored with his first touch, brought him to the attention of Terry Brown, the then Aldershot manager, who was later to sign him for AFC Wimbledon.

=== Marsaxlokk ===
Having been released by Yeovil at the end of the 2006–07 season, Webb moved to Malta to sign for champions Marsaxlokk under the guidance of English manager Brian Talbot.

Webb only played once for Marsaxlokk in an appearance in a Champions League qualifier against FK Sarajevo.

=== AFC Wimbledon ===
Following his stint with Marsaxlokk, Webb returned to England to sign for AFC Wimbledon on 23 July 2007, ending the club's long search for a "target man". However, Webb failed to score regularly for the Dons and after losing his place in the starting team played only a bit-part role for much of the second half of the 2007–08 season. He was one of eight players released at the end of the campaign after being deemed surplus to requirements by Dons boss Terry Brown.

=== Chelmsford City ===
On 1 July 2008, he signed a contract with Chelmsford City becoming the Claret's second pre-season signing. However was later released by Chelmsford City for not being in Jeff King's plans.

=== Havant & Waterlooville ===
After being released by Chelmsford City, he signed a contract with Havant & Waterlooville in October 2008. He made three league appearances for Havant before going on trial at Salisbury City.

=== Salisbury City ===
Whilst on trial, Webb played one game and impressed manager Nick Holmes which resulted in him being signed by the club after they lost some of their first choice strikers due to financial problems. In 2009–10, Webb was a utility player for Salisbury, playing in defence, and once filling in for James Bittner in goal, against former club Wimbledon, after Bittner saw red early in the second half. For a period of time, he also partnered Tubbs up front when other forwards in the squad were sidelined by injury.

=== Bath City ===
Webb left Salisbury City for Bath City during the summer of 2010. This was as a result of the club's two league demotion. He scored his first goal for Bath in their 2–1 defeat of Crawley Town and was soon a regular in the Bath side. However, after the summer break, Webb had trouble in breaking back into the side for the 2011–12 season and so joined his former club Salisbury City on loan on 2 November 2011. The loan move was later made permanent.

== Coaching career ==
=== Leyton Orient ===
Webb joined Leyton Orient in 2011 as Under 14's coach. Since then he has progressed through the age groups and led the under-16s to National Category Three Cup final victory in 2014. Webb stepped up to assist Academy Director Andy Edwards at the start of 2015–16 season with the under-18s. After Edwards was promoted to assist manager Kevin Nolan on a more regular basis, Webb led Orient's youngsters to the Merit League Two title — finishing unbeaten from their 10 games.

On 1 July 2016, Webb was promoted to First Team Coach. On 29 January 2017, he was appointed manager at Orient after Andy Edwards resigned to take a role on the FA's coaching staff. On 30 March 2017, after 12 games in charge Webb resigned as manager of Leyton Orient. On 1 July 2017, Webb returned to Leyton Orient as Youth Team Coach. Webb later became a First Team Coach under Justin Edinburgh and became assistant to Ross Embleton after Edinburgh's death. Webb left the club by mutual consent on 12 February 2020.

=== Chesterfield ===
Webb became First Team Coach at Chesterfield on 24 April 2021. He became assistant manager in the summer, and had a spell as caretaker manager when manager James Rowe was suspended after allegations of misconduct. After Rowe left the club, Webb remained at the club under new manager Paul Cook.

=== Yeovil Town ===
On 12 September 2025, Webb was appointed first-team manager at his National League side Yeovil Town signing a contract until the end of the 2026–27 season. On 22 September 2025, Webb resigned as manager of Yeovil Town after only one match in charge due to "personal and family reasons".

=== Return to Chesterfield ===
On 2 October 2025, Webb returned to Chesterfield as assistant manager, under Paul Cook.

== Personal life ==
Webb is the son of former Chelsea player David Webb, with whom he has had a number of links throughout his playing career.

== Career statistics ==
Appearances and goals by club, season and competition
Club	Season	League			FA Cup		League Cup		Other		Total	
Club	Season	Division	Apps	Goals	Apps	Goals	Apps	Goals	Apps	Goals	Apps	Goals
Southend United	2000–01	Third Division	15	1	2	0	0	0	3 (Note: Appearances in EFL Trophy)	0	20	1
Southend United	2001–02	Third Division	16	2	0	0	1	0	2	1	19	3
Southend United	Total		31	3	2	0	1	0	5	1	39	4
Brighton & Hove Albion (loan)	2001–02	Second Division	12	1	1	0	0	0	0	0	13	1
Brighton & Hove Albion (loan)	2002–03	First Division	3	0	0	0	0	0	—		3	0
Brighton & Hove Albion (loan)	Total		15	1	1	0	0	0	0	0	16	1
Hull City	2002–03	Third Division	12	0	0	0	0	0	0	0	12	0
Hull City	2003–04	Third Division	4	0	0	0	0	0	2	1	6	1
Hull City	Total		16	0	0	0	0	0	2	1	18	1
Lincoln City (loan)	2002–03	Third Division	5	1	0	0	0	0	0	0	5	1
Cambridge United (loan)	2003–04	Third Division	10	1	0	0	0	0	0	0	10	1
Cambridge United	2003–04	Third Division	11	2	0	0	0	0	0	0	11	2
Cambridge United	2004–05	League Two	22	1	1	0	0	0	1	0	24	1
Cambridge United	Total		43	4	1	0	0	0	1	0	45	4
Yeovil Town	2005–06	League One	4	0	0	0	0	0	0	0	4	0
Yeovil Town	2006–07	League One	4	0	1	0	0	0	1	0	6	0
Yeovil Town	Total		8	0	1	0	0	0	1	0	10	0
Rushden & Diamonds (loan)	2006–07	Conference Premier	1	0	0	0	—		—		1	0
Woking (loan)	2006–07	Conference Premier	7	1	0	0	—		—		7	1
Marsaxlokk	2007–08	Maltese Premier League	0	0	0	0	0	0	1 (Note: Appearances in UEFA Champions League)	0	1	0
AFC Wimbledon	2007–08	Isthmian Premier	33	9	0	0	0	0	0	0	33	9
Salisbury City	2008–09	Conference Premier	20	1	0	0	—		1 (Note: Appearances in FA Trophy)	0	21	1
Salisbury City	2009–10	Conference Premier	29	2	1	0	—		—		30	2
Salisbury City	Total		49	3	1	0	0	0	1	0	51	3
Bath City	2010–11	Conference Premier	29	2	0	0	—		2	0	31	2
Salisbury City (loan)	2011–12	Conference South	6	0	3	0	—		1	0	10	0
Salisbury City	2011–12	Conference South	21	1	1	0	—		1	0	23	1
Salisbury City	Total		27	1	4	0	0	0	2	0	33	1
Dover Athletic	2012–13	Conference South	22	1	0	0	—		—		22	1
Chelmsford City	2013–14	Conference South	14	0	0	0	—		—		14	0
Career total			300	26	10	0	1	0	15	2	326	28

== Managerial statistics ==
Managerial record by team and tenure
Team	From	To	Record					Ref
Team	From	To	P	W	D	L	Win %	Ref
Leyton Orient	29 January 2017	30 March 2017	12	2	1	9	16.7	
Chesterfield (caretaker)	4 February 2022	10 February 2022	2	1	1	0	50.0	
Yeovil Town	15 September 2025	22 September 2025	1	0	0	1	0.0	(Note: Although Webb's appointment was announced before Yeovil Town's match against Woking on 13 September 2025, Richard Dryden remained in charge of the first team for that game and Webb did not officially take over until 15 September 2025.)
Total			16	4	2	10	25.0	—

== Honours ==
Brighton & Hove Albion

- Football League Second Division: 2001–02
