= Anthony Barry (footballer) =

English football coach (born 1986)

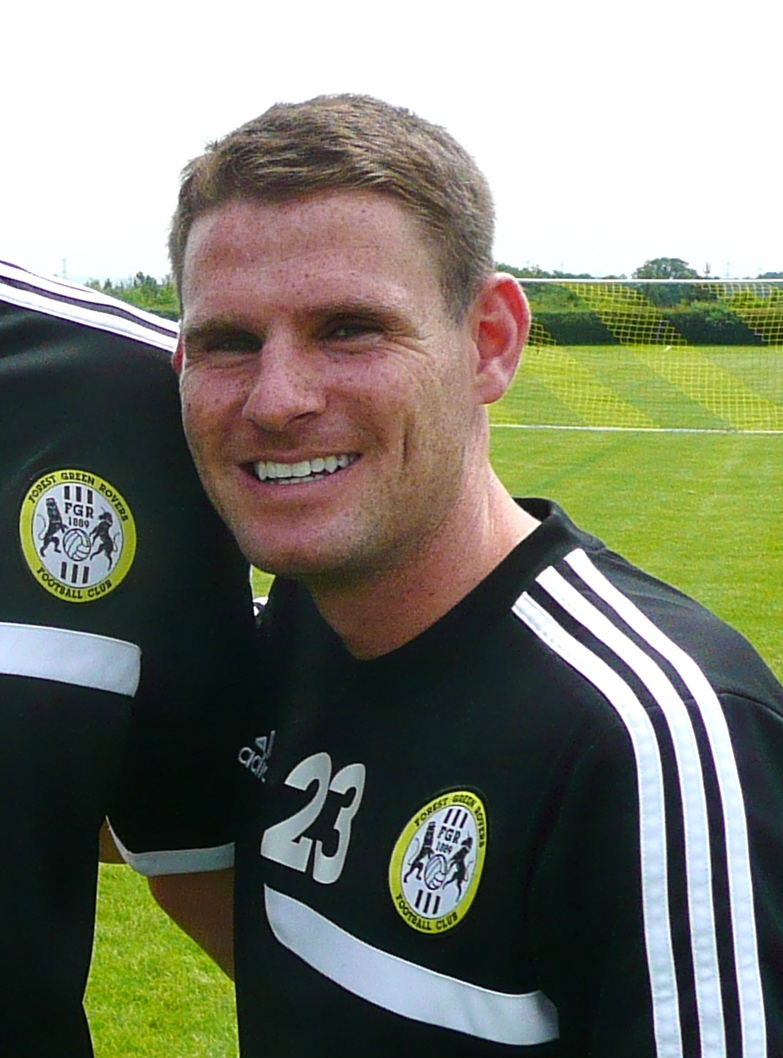

Personal information
- Full name: Anthony Jon Barry
- Date of birth: 29 May 1986 (age 40)
- Place of birth: Liverpool, England
- Height: 5 ft 7 in (1.70 m)
- Position: Midfielder

Team information
- Current team: England (assistant)

Youth career
- –2004: Everton

Senior career*
| Years | Team | Apps | (Gls) |
| 2004–2005 | Coventry City | 0 | (0) |
| 2005–2006 | Accrington Stanley | 26 | (0) |
| 2006–2008 | Yeovil Town | 64 | (0) |
| 2008–2010 | Chester City (Note: All Chester City players' statistics for the 2009/10 season were expunged after Chester were expelled from the Conference National for breaking league regulations) | 43 | (1) |
| 2010 | Wrexham | 0 | (0) |
| 2010–2013 | Fleetwood Town | 58 | (2) |
| 2013–2015 | Forest Green Rovers | 36 | (3) |
| 2014–2015 | → Accrington Stanley (loan) | 13 | (0) |
| 2015–2016 | Accrington Stanley | 8 | (0) |
| 2016–2017 | Wrexham | 31 | (2) |
| Total | | 279 | (8) |
- * Club domestic league appearances and goals

Anthony Jon Barry (born 29 May 1986) is an English professional football coach and former player who is an assistant manager for the England national team.

== Playing career ==
Barry signed for Everton as a trainee and when released signed for Coventry City where he was a regular in the reserves. He joined Accrington Stanley in 2005, and was an ever-present for the first half of the 2005–06 season, making 26 Conference appearances as the side headed for promotion back to The Football League. In January 2006, he joined Yeovil Town.

Barry made 64 league appearances for Yeovil Town, before being released in May 2008. This stint included an appearance at Wembley Stadium in the Football League One play–off final against Blackpool in 2006–07. He scored his only goal for Yeovil in a 2–1 defeat at Shrewsbury Town in the Football League Trophy on 31 October 2006.

On 19 June 2008, Barry signed a two-year contract with Chester City. He went on to feature in 43 of Chester's 46 league games during their relegation season from Football League Two, with his only goal being a spectacular long-range effort against Lincoln City in January 2009. His contract with Chester was terminated on 11 January 2010 with immediate notice. He signed for Wrexham on an 18-month deal on 16 January, but left the club less than one week later after asking to be released from his contract. On 24 January 2010 he signed for Conference North side Fleetwood Town, after being offered three times the amount he was paid with Wrexham. This move angered Wrexham's manager, Dean Saunders. Barry was named in the Conference Team of the Year for the 2010–11 season after Fleetwood reached the play-off semi-finals. It was announced on 7 May 2013, that Fleetwood would not be offering the midfielder a new contract, and would therefore be released.

In May 2013, he joined Forest Green Rovers on a three-year deal. He made his debut for the club on 10 August 2013 in an 8–0 win against Hyde at The New Lawn. He scored his first goal for the club on 17 August 2013 in an away defeat against Lincoln City. On 8 October 2014, having failed to make an appearance in the 2014–15 season for Forest Green, he re-joined League Two club Accrington Stanley on a 93-day loan. In January 2015, the loan deal was extended until the end of the season.

On 7 June 2016, Barry signed for National League side Wrexham. Barry was released by Wrexham at the end of the 2016–17 season.

== Coaching career ==
Barry began his coaching career in 2015 while still playing for Accrington Stanley, where he managed the under-16 team. After retiring as a player, he became the assistant coach to Paul Cook at Wigan Athletic in 2017. In the summer of 2020, Barry joined Chelsea as first-team coach under Frank Lampard and remained in his position under Thomas Tuchel. In February 2021, Barry replaced the departed Damien Duff in Stephen Kenny's Republic of Ireland coaching team. Barry combined the role at Chelsea with the part-time role with the Republic of Ireland.

In February 2022, Barry left the Irish set-up to join Roberto Martinez at Belgium's coaching team. Barry cited coaching the world's no. 1 ranked team and the opportunity to compete at the World Cup as his motivation for leaving Ireland and joining the Belgians. In March 2023, he had another dual role by joining Roberto Martinez’s staff for the Portugal national team. When Thomas Tuchel took over as Bayern Munich manager, Barry joined his coaching staff in April 2023.

In October 2024, it was announced that Barry would be joining the England coaching staff as assistant manager to Thomas Tuchel starting on 1 January 2025.

== Career statistics ==
Appearances and goals by club, season and competition
| Club | Season | League | | | FA Cup | | League Cup | | Other | | Total | |
| Club | Season | Division | Apps | Goals | Apps | Goals | Apps | Goals | Apps | Goals | Apps | Goals |
|---|---|---|---|---|---|---|---|---|---|---|---|---|
| Accrington Stanley | 2005–06 | Conference National | 26 | 0 | 1 | 0 | — | | 4 (Note: One appearance in Football League Trophy, three in FA Trophy) | 0 | 31 | 0 |
| Yeovil Town | 2005–06 | League One | 4 | 0 | — | | — | | — | | 4 | 0 |
| Yeovil Town | 2006–07 | League One | 24 | 0 | 1 | 0 | 0 | 0 | 4 (Note: Three appearances in League One play-offs, one appearance and one goal in Football League Trophy) | 1 | 29 | 1 |
| Yeovil Town | 2007–08 | League One | 36 | 0 | 1 | 0 | 1 | 0 | 3 (Note: Appearances in Football League Trophy) | 0 | 41 | 0 |
| Yeovil Town | Total | | 64 | 0 | 2 | 0 | 1 | 0 | 7 | 1 | 74 | 1 |
| Chester City | 2008–09 | League Two | 43 | 1 | 1 | 0 | 1 | 0 | 1 | 0 | 46 | 1 |
| Chester City | 2009–10 | Conference Premier | — | | — | | — | | — | | — | |
| Wrexham | 2009–10 | Conference Premier | 0 | 0 | — | | — | | — | | 0 | 0 |
| Fleetwood Town | 2009–10 | Conference North | ~ | ~ | — | | — | | ~ | ~ | ~ | ~ |
| Fleetwood Town | 2010–11 | Conference Premier | 44 | 2 | 3 | 0 | — | | 3 (Note: Two appearances Conference Premier play-offs, one in FA Trophy) | 0 | 50 | 2 |
| Fleetwood Town | 2011–12 | Conference Premier | 2 | 0 | 0 | 0 | — | | 0 | 0 | 2 | 0 |
| Fleetwood Town | 2012–13 | League Two | 12 | 0 | 0 | 0 | 0 | 0 | 0 | 0 | 12 | 0 |
| Fleetwood Town | Total | | 58 | 2 | 3 | 0 | 0 | 0 | 3 | 0 | 64 | 2 |
| Forest Green Rovers | 2013–14 | Conference Premier | 36 | 3 | 1 | 0 | — | | 4 (Note: Appearances in FA Trophy) | 0 | 41 | 3 |
| Accrington Stanley (loan) | 2014–15 | League Two | 13 | 0 | 0 | 0 | — | | — | | 13 | 0 |
| Accrington Stanley | 2015–16 | League Two | 8 | 0 | 1 | 0 | 1 | 0 | 1 | 0 | 11 | 0 |
| Accrington Stanley | Total | | 21 | 0 | 1 | 0 | 1 | 0 | 1 | 0 | 24 | 0 |
| Wrexham | 2016–17 | National League | 31 | 2 | 2 | 0 | — | | 1 | 0 | 34 | 2 |
| Career total | | | 279 | 8 | 11 | 0 | 3 | 0 | 21 | 1 | 314 | 9 |

== Honours ==
=== As a player ===
Accrington Stanley

- Conference National: 2005–06

Fleetwood Town

- Football Conference: 2011–12
- Conference North play-offs: 2010

=== As an assistant manager ===
Chelsea

- UEFA Champions League: 2020–21

England

- FIFA World Cup third place: 2026
