= Daniel Barker (footballer) =

British Virgin Islands footballer

Personal information
- Date of birth: 30 January 1987 (age 39)
- Position: Goalkeeper

Youth career
- 2003–2006: Yeovil Town

Senior career*
Years	Team	Apps	(Gls)
2006–2007	Yeovil Town	0	(0)
2007	→ Tiverton Town (loan)		
2011–2014	Wincanton Town		

International career
2014–2016	British Virgin Islands	5	(0)
- * Club domestic league appearances and goals

Daniel Barker (born 30 January 1987) is a former footballer who played as a goalkeeper. Born in England, he represented the British Virgin Islands at international level.

== Club career ==
Born in Oxford, Barker was a Yeovil Town youth graduate before being promoted to the main squad in 2006, being assigned the no. 23 shirt. He was released in 2007, after a spell on loan at Tiverton Town.

Barker also represented Wincanton Town for a period between 2011 and 2014.

== International career ==
Barker made his first appearance for the British Virgin Islands national football team on 21 September 2014, starting in a 0–6 friendly loss against St. Vincent and the Grenadines.
