= Scott Guyett =

Footballer (born 1976)

Personal information
- Full name: Scott Barry Guyett
- Date of birth: 20 January 1976 (age 50)
- Place of birth: Ascot, England
- Height: 6 ft 2 in (1.88 m)
- Position: Defender

Senior career*
Years	Team	Apps	(Gls)
1996–1997	Gresley Rovers	73	(3)
1997–2001	Southport	74	(11)
2001–2002	Oxford United	22	(0)
2002–2004	Chester City	59	(4)
2004–2008	Yeovil Town	89	(2)
2005	→ Aldershot Town (loan)	13	(1)
2008–2010	AFC Bournemouth	34	(0)
2010	Dorchester Town	6	(0)
Total		370	(21)

Managerial career
- 2021–: Brisbane Roar (assistant)
- * Club domestic league appearances and goals

Scott Barry Guyett (born 20 January 1976) is a former professional footballer who played as a defender. He has been on the books of the Brisbane City Soccer Club in Newmarket, Queensland.

== Career ==
Guyett was born in Ascot, Berkshire, England. He is of Australian nationality, having spent most of his childhood in Australia. His career in England started at Gresley Rovers, where he won a Southern League title in 1996–97 before making an impact with Southport, who were enjoying a period of relative success in the Football Conference. He helped them to a top-four finish in 2000–01 and then followed manager Mark Wright to Football League side Oxford United along with central defensive partner Phil Bolland.

A year later, Guyett was on the move again as he teamed up with Wright at Chester City, where he was named player of the season in 2002–03 and then won a Conference championship medal a year later. But he opted to join Yeovil Town in the summer of 2004 and remained there until 2008, bar a loan spell with Aldershot Town in 2005. In May 2007, Guyett played at Wembley Stadium in the Football League One play-off final against Blackpool (making him the first Australian to play at the new Wembley).

He moved to AFC Bournemouth in the summer of 2008, at the age of 32, after being allowed to leave Yeovil Town by mutual consent. He was released two years later, and after a short spell with Dorchester Town, moved to Crystal Palace to work as the club's Fitness Coach.

== Honours ==
Gresley Rovers

- Southern League: 1996–97

Chester City

- Football Conference: 2003–04

Yeovil Town

- Football League Two: 2004–05

Individual

- Chester City Player of the season: 2002–03
- Football Conference Team of the Year: 2002–03
