= Gary Johnson (football manager) =

English footballer and manager

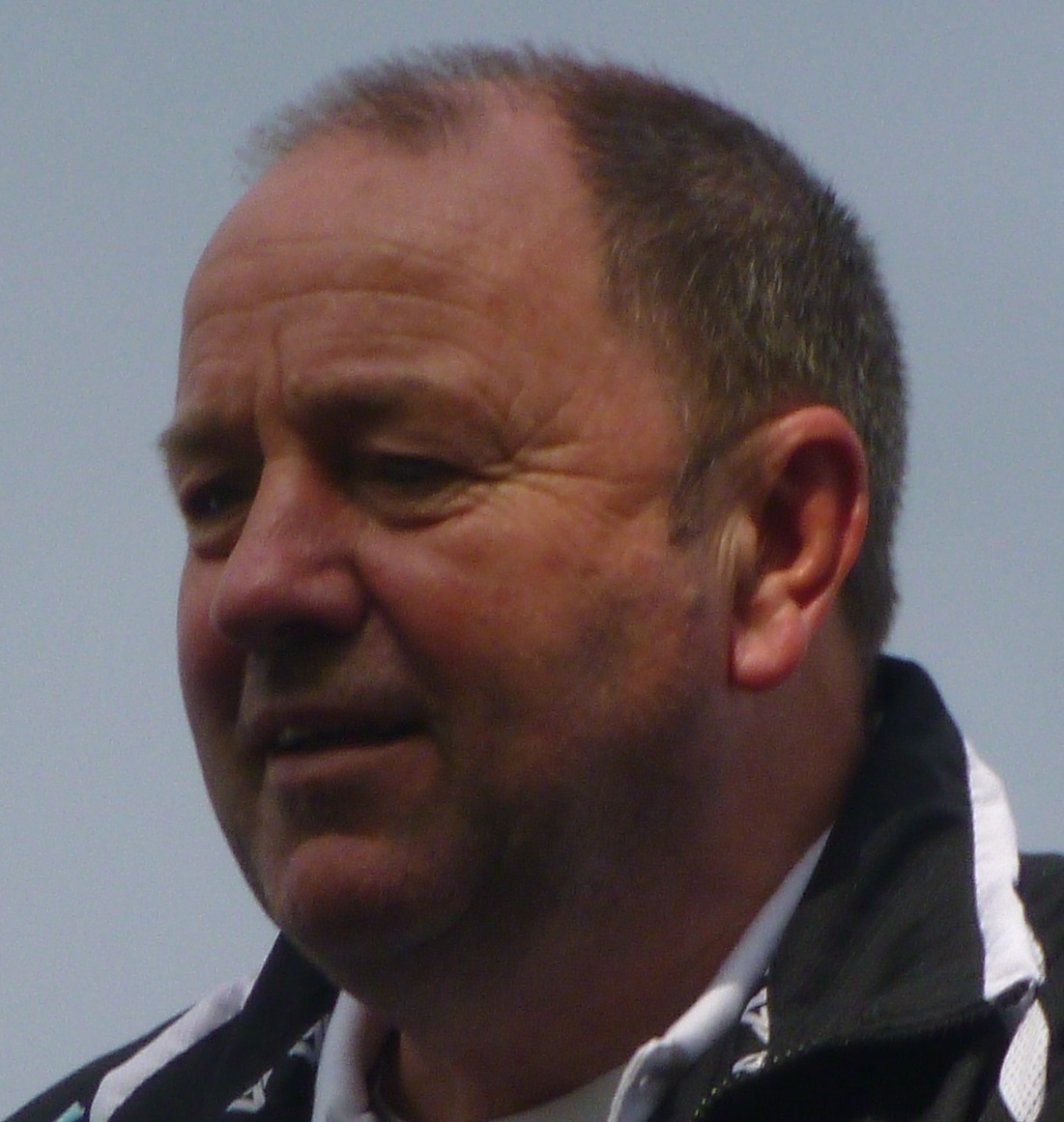
- Johnson in 2013

Personal information
- Full name: Gary Stephen Johnson
- Date of birth: 28 September 1955 (age 71)
- Place of birth: Hammersmith, London, England
- Position: Midfielder

Team information
- Current team: Taunton Town (manager)

Youth career
- Watford

Senior career*
Years	Team	Apps	(Gls)
- Malmö FF
- Soham Town Rangers
- Newmarket Town
- Cambridge United

Managerial career
- 1986–1988: Newmarket Town
- 1992: Cambridge United (caretaker)
- 1993–1995: Cambridge United
- 1995–1997: Kettering Town
- 1999–2001: Latvia
- 2001–2005: Yeovil Town
- 2005–2010: Bristol City
- 2010–2011: Peterborough United
- 2011: Northampton Town
- 2012–2015: Yeovil Town
- 2015–2018: Cheltenham Town
- 2018–2024: Torquay United
- 2025–: Taunton Town
- * Club domestic league appearances and goals

Gary Stephen Johnson (born 28 September 1955) is a former football player who is currently the manager of Southern League Premier Division South side Taunton Town.

Johnson signed for Watford as an apprentice at sixteen and turned professional at the age of eighteen. After a spell with Malmö FF, he set up a football holiday business and played part-time football. He took his first managerial job at Newmarket Town in 1986. Johnson moved to Cambridge United in 1988 initially as a reserve team manager before working his way up to manager by 1993. He spent two years as Cambridge's manager before moving to Kettering Town. He became the manager of the Latvia national team in 1999. In 2001, Johnson signed with non-League side Yeovil Town. In his first season he won the FA Trophy before guiding the club to the Conference title in the following season. Johnson won another promotion two years later, leading the club to the League Two title. This earned him a move to Bristol City in 2005. In his first full season, Johnson led his team to an automatic promotion to the Championship which earned him the division's Manager of the Year award. The club finished in the play-off positions the following season, losing the 2008 Football League Championship play-off final to Hull City.

He departed the club in March 2010 and would have spells at Peterborough United and Northampton Town. In January 2012, Johnson returned to former club Yeovil Town. After saving the club from relegation, Johnson led the club to the Championship for the first time in its history, beating Brentford in the 2013 League One play-off final. In February 2015, he was relieved of his duties at Yeovil. The following month, he joined Cheltenham Town. He was unable to keep the club in the Football League, but the club returned the following year, winning the National League title. He left Cheltenham in August 2018. The following month, he signed with Torquay United and won the National League South title in 2018–19. The club were relegated in 2022–23, and he left the club by mutual consent in February 2024.

== Playing career ==
Johnson signed for Watford as an apprentice at sixteen and turned professional at the age of eighteen. He then left Vicarage Road and moved to play football in Sweden for Malmö FF. After building up a successful football holiday business, Johnson then returned to England and played part-time football for Soham Town Rangers, Newmarket Town and Cambridge United.

After his playing career ended, Johnson spent the next six years training to earn his coaching badges and took his first managerial job at Newmarket Town in 1986.

== Management career ==
=== Cambridge United ===
Johnson was the manager at Newmarket Town, when he was persuaded to join Cambridge United as reserve team manager in 1988. Appointed as assistant manager in 1990, Johnson helped John Beck organise the U's remarkable rise in the early 1990s, in which they came within two matches of becoming the first club to rise from the old Fourth Division to the top flight in successive seasons (Northampton Town having spent two seasons in both the third and second divisions before promotion to the first division in 1966). Johnson was briefly caretaker manager in late 1992 and then took charge from 1993 until 1995. Under Johnson's stewardship, the U's were contenders for a play-off place in Division Two in 1993–94, before eventually finishing tenth. The following season, many players were sold to balance the books and Johnson moved to take over at Kettering Town.

=== Kettering Town ===
After leaving Cambridge, Johnson took over as manager of Kettering Town as the club introduced full-time football for the first time in the club's history. However, once the decision was made to revert to being a part-time club, Johnson moved to Watford as director of their youth academy by request of former England manager Graham Taylor.

=== Latvia ===
He was approached by the Latvian football authorities for help, and became coach of their national team for two years from 1999 to 2001.

Whilst coaching Latvia, he spotted the potential of Marians Pahars and recommended him to Southampton's manager Dave Jones, who invited Pahars for a trial before signing him in March 1999. He also recommended Igors Stepanovs to Arsenal manager Arsène Wenger.

Johnson left the job after Latvia drew 1–1 with San Marino. He then returned to England and eventually took over as manager of non-League side Yeovil Town.

=== Yeovil Town ===
In his first year in charge at Huish Park, the Glovers won the FA Trophy by beating Stevenage 2–0 in the final at Villa Park as well as finishing third in the Football Conference; the following year they won the greater prize of the Conference championship by a record margin of seventeen points and topping the hundred goals mark too, winning promotion to the Football League. Yeovil were immediately contenders in the League and after their debut season ended by missing out on the playoffs by goal difference, they were Division Three champions at the second attempt, scoring ninety goals in the process.

During a League Cup game against Plymouth Argyle, Johnson's son (Lee Johnson) accidentally scored a goal after attempting to play the ball back to Argyle's keeper (who had kicked the ball out because of an injury to a Plymouth player). In a show of good sportsmanship Gary Johnson told his players to allow Argyle to walk the ball into the net to level the score at 1–1, avoiding controversy. Yeovil went on to win the game 3–2, with Lee Johnson scoring a hat-trick.

=== Bristol City ===
Despite turning down an approach from Derby County in the summer of 2005, Johnson became Bristol City's target when their manager Brian Tinnion resigned that September. Yeovil agreed compensation terms and he became City's manager on 26 September 2005. Despite their lowly position of 22nd in the table, City's fortunes turned around under Johnson and a great run of form in the second half of the season saw them in play-off contention, eventually finishing ninth after a run of 55 points from 36 games.

Johnson won the League One Manager of the Month award for April 2006. After a 2006–07 season (including an 18 match unbeaten run), Johnson won the award again in March 2007 after successfully guiding his side to 16 points from seven games the previous month. This had set Bristol City in a good spot to contend for automatic promotion, which they sealed on 5 May 2007 with a 3–1 home win over Rotherham on the last day of the season.

On 6 September 2007, Gary Johnson and assistant Keith Millen both signed 2 1/2-year contract extensions keeping them at the club until 2010. In the 2007–08 season, he kept Bristol City in the top six of the Championship for almost the entire season and in the top two for a long time. Bristol City eventually lost the play-off final to Hull City at Wembley and were not promoted to the Premiership. Johnson made his players stay on the pitch after the match and watch the Hull City players celebrate as a motivational experience for the next campaign.

In the summer before the 2008–09 season, he broke the club record for a transfer fee in signing 21-year-old Nicky Maynard from Crewe Alexandra for £2.25 million. Bristol City's once-famous chant of 'Johnson says bounce around the ground' was inspired by Gary Johnson who was quoted to saying in an interview before a league game that he wanted the fans bouncing around. In September 2008, Johnson signed a new five-year contract with Bristol City, to keep him at the club until 2013. The club ended the season with another top ten finish and on 18 March 2010, with the club comfortably in mid table, the club issued a statement that Johnson had "left his post as manager of Bristol City by mutual consent".

=== Peterborough United ===
He was appointed manager of Peterborough United on a two-year contract on 6 April 2010. With the club lying outside the playoff positions, Johnson left Peterborough on 10 January 2011. The reasons are that the manager and the chairman could not agree future policy.

=== Northampton Town ===
On 4 March 2011, Johnson was announced as the new manager of Northampton Town signing on a 2 1/2-year deal. His first season in charge almost saw the club relegated from the Football League. At the time of Johnson's appointment Northampton had only lost one of their previous seven games, but a disastrous run, in which the club went eleven games without a win, saw them slip down the table. Under Johnson they had only managed to pick up six points, and it was only by beating Stevenage in the penultimate game of the season that they secured their survival. Northampton Town and Johnson parted company by mutual consent on 14 November, the team having secured just four wins in the new campaign.

=== Yeovil Town ===
On 9 January 2012, Johnson returned to former club Yeovil Town, replacing Terry Skiverton who became Johnson's assistant. The Glovers, with Johnson at the helm, produced an impressive run of form with thirty points in nineteen games to reach safety with two games still left to play.

The 2012–13 season started well for Johnson at Yeovil where in early September, his side remained unbeaten in League One after four games and were top of the table as well as progressing in the Football League Trophy and narrowly losing 4–2 to West Bromwich Albion in the Football League Cup in the second round. There then followed six successive league defeats before results improved.

On 29 December 2012, Yeovil Town beat Portsmouth 2–1 at Fratton Park which was the start of a run of eight consecutive League One wins, a club Football League record. Johnson was nominated for the January Manager of the Month award but missed out with Dean Smith of Walsall the eventual winner.

On 6 May 2013, Yeovil defeated Sheffield United 2–1 on aggregate to reach the League One play-off final. On 19 May 2013, Johnson led Yeovil to a 2–1 victory over Brentford in the League One play-off final at Wembley Stadium which resulted in them being promoted to the Football League Championship for the first time in the club's history.

On 4 February 2015, with Yeovil bottom of the League One table Johnson was relieved of his duties.

=== Cheltenham Town ===
On 30 March 2015, Johnson was appointed as manager of League Two side Cheltenham Town, with the club bottom of the table two points from a position of safety. Despite Cheltenham's failure to avoid relegation, Johnson's contract was extended until the end of the 2016–17 season. The next season was a great success as the Robins won the National League championship title and an instant return to the Football League, the first time a relegated team had won the National League title since 1989, and Johnson became only the second manager to win multiple National League titles.

On 21 August 2018, Cheltenham Town announced they had 'parted company' with Johnson four games into the new season.

=== Torquay United ===
On 13 September 2018, Johnson was appointed as manager of Torquay United. He went on to guide them to the National League South title with three games remaining. On 4 July 2019, Johnson signed a new contract at Torquay United. Torquay finished 14th in their first season back in the National League. In the 2020–21 season, Torquay finished as runners-up in the league. In the play-offs, Torquay lost the final to Hartlepool United on penalties.

After an 11th place finish in the 2021–22 season, Johnson oversaw Torquay United's relegation from the National League at the end of the 2022–23 season. On 22 February 2024, Johnson left the club by mutual consent with them sitting 11th in the National League South. His departure came on the same day as Torquay United owner Clark Osborne announced plans to appoint administrators.

=== Return to Cheltenham Town ===
Johnson returned to Cheltenham Town as Director of Football on May 24, 2024.

He resigned from his role in September 2025.

=== Taunton Town ===
On 22 December 2025, Johnson was appointed manager of Southern League Premier Division South club Taunton Town.

== Managerial statistics ==
As of match played 29 March 2026

Managerial record by team and tenure
Team	From	To	Record				
Team	From	To	P	W	D	L	Win %
Cambridge United	22 October 1992	1 April 1995	136	41	38	57	30.1
Kettering Town	1 June 1995	10 June 1996	49	15	12	22	30.6
Latvia	5 September 1999	26 April 2001	14	3	3	8	21.4
Yeovil Town	19 June 2001	23 September 2005	221	116	46	59	52.5
Bristol City	26 September 2005	18 March 2010	239	96	69	74	40.2
Peterborough United	6 April 2010	10 January 2011	33	15	4	14	45.5
Northampton Town	4 March 2011	14 November 2011	34	7	10	17	20.6
Yeovil Town	9 January 2012	4 February 2015	162	56	34	72	34.6
Cheltenham Town	30 March 2015	21 August 2018	172	65	43	64	37.8
Torquay United	13 September 2018	22 February 2024	267	121	54	92	45.3
Taunton Town	22 December 2025	present	15	3	4	8	20.0
Total			1,341	538	316	487	40.1

== Honours ==
=== Manager ===
Yeovil Town

- Football League One play-offs: 2013
- Football League Two: 2004–05
- Football Conference: 2002–03
- FA Trophy: 2001–02

Bristol City

- Football League One second-place promotion: 2006–07

Cheltenham Town

- National League: 2015–16

Torquay United

- National League South: 2018–19

Individual

- Football Conference Manager of the Month: September 2002, March 2003, April 2003
- Football Conference Manager of the Year: 2002–03
- Football League One Manager of the Month: April 2006, March 2007
