= Terry Skiverton =

English footballer (born 1975)

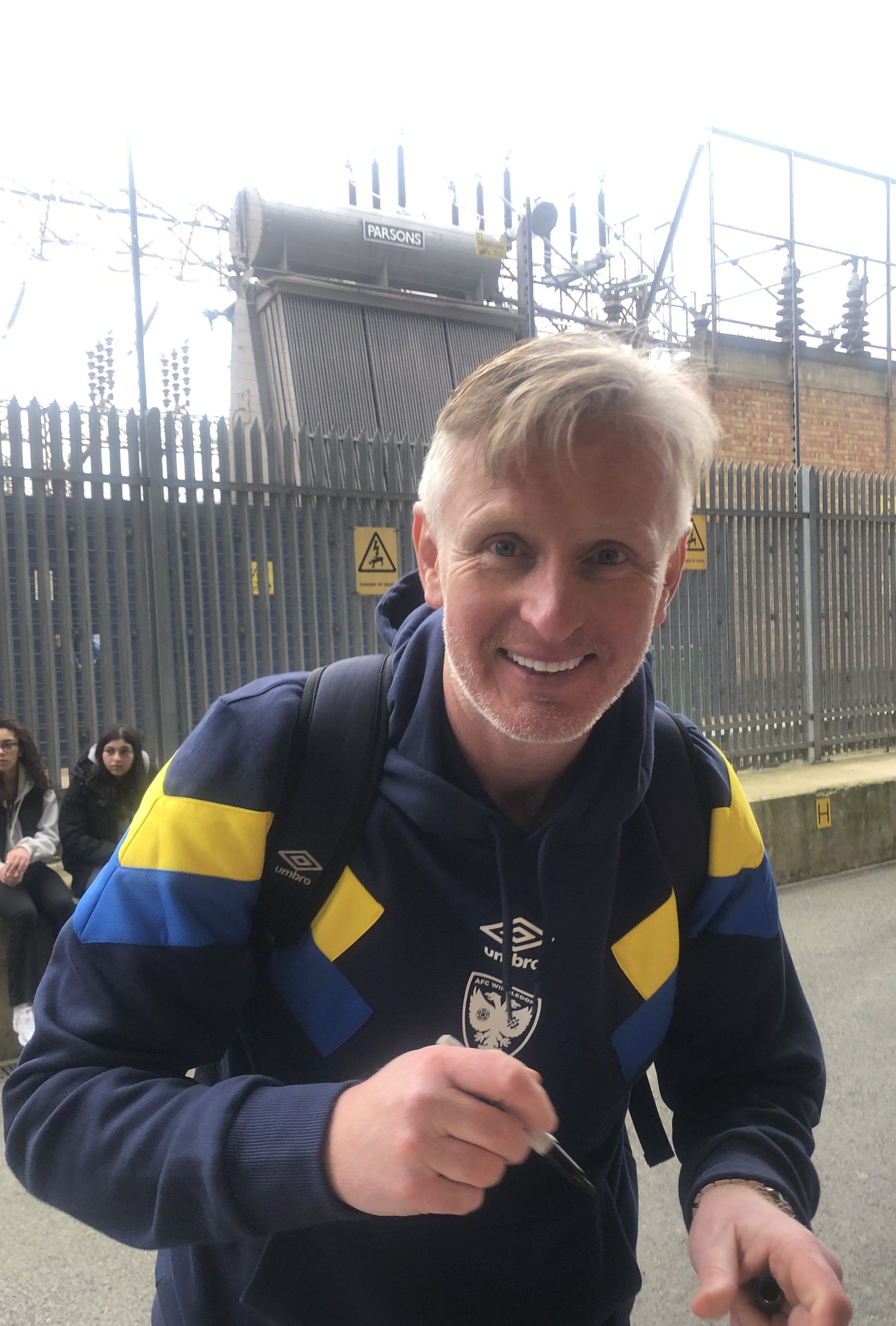
- Skiverton in 2025.

Personal information
- Full name: Terence John Skiverton
- Date of birth: 26 June 1975 (age 51)
- Place of birth: Mile End, England
- Height: 6 ft 0 in (1.83 m)
- Position: Centre back

Team information
- Current team: AFC Wimbledon (assistant manager)

Youth career
- 1991–1993: Chelsea

Senior career*
Years	Team	Apps	(Gls)
1993–1996	Chelsea	0	(0)
1995	→ Sandefjord BK (loan)	3	(0)
1995–1996	→ Wycombe Wanderers (loan)	10	(1)
1996–1997	Wycombe Wanderers	10	(1)
1997–1999	Welling United	73	(4)
1999–2010	Yeovil Town	328	(38)
Total		424	(44)

International career
2001–2003	England semi-pro	4	(0)

Managerial career
- 2009–2012: Yeovil Town
- 2015: Yeovil Town (caretaker)
- * Club domestic league appearances and goals

Terence John Skiverton (born 26 June 1975) is an English former footballer who enjoyed a long playing career at Yeovil Town for 11 years that led him to appear 382 times in all competitions. He then became their manager and subsequently, assistant manager, manager and then assistant manager again. He is currently assistant manager at EFL League One club AFC Wimbledon.

As a player, Skiverton played as a centre back. He started his career at Chelsea, failing to make a first-team appearance but made many reserve appearances, making Captain of the reserve team before moving to Wycombe Wanderers – initially on loan – and then dropping out of the football league by moving to Welling United. He finally retired with Yeovil in 2010. As captain, Skiverton took Yeovil into the Football League for the first time in their history. While playing for Yeovil in the Football Conference, he was called up several times for the England national semi-pro team and made four appearances.

== Early life and playing career ==
Terence John Skiverton was born on 26 June 1975 in Mile End, Greater London. He began his career as a trainee at Chelsea, but never made the first team. After a loan spell, he made the permanent move to Wycombe Wanderers in 1996, and a year later dropped out of league football to join Welling United. He also had a short spell in Norway in 1995, playing for Sandefjord BK in the Norwegian First Division.

He joined Yeovil from Welling in 1999, and was a key part of the club, playing at centre back as they gained promotions from the Football Conference to League One.

After joining, Yeovil he gained cult status with the fans and is a hero at the club, playing over 300 league games before becoming player-manager of the club. Skiverton announced his retirement from playing on 9 May 2010 after appearing 382 times and scoring 42 goals in all competitions making him Yeovil's tenth most-capped post-war player. He even played in goal to cover for the injured Steve Mildenhall in a game against Leyton Orient in September 2007. He conceded no goals after coming on to the pitch.

Skiverton made four appearances for the England national semi-pro team between 2001 and 2003.

== Coaching and managerial career ==
=== Yeovil Town ===
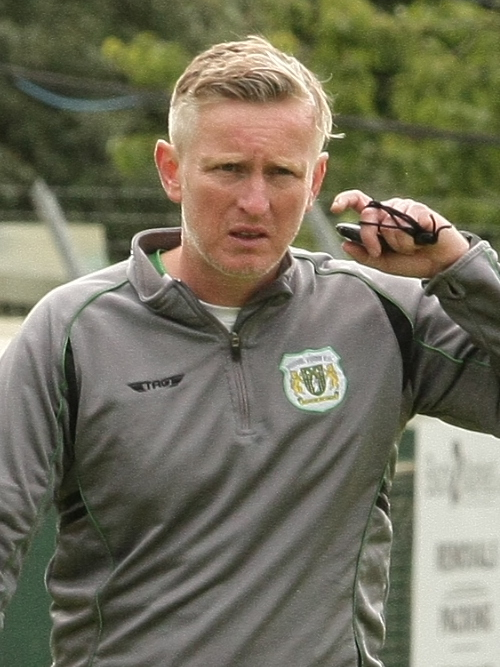
Skiverton at Yeovil Town training in 2020.

On 18 February 2009, Skiverton was named as Yeovil's player-manager after the club had parted company with Russell Slade earlier in the week. He succeeded in keeping Yeovil in League One with a series of good home results finishing in 17th place with 51 points.

On 9 May 2010, after only appearing as a player twice since his appointment he relinquished his playing duties and became just a manager.

In January 2011, Skiverton was nominated for the Football League's Manager of the Month award but he subsequently lost out to Rochdale manager Keith Hill, and on 26 February 2011, Skiverton took charge of his 100th match as Yeovil manager in a 1 – 0 win away to Tranmere Rovers.

On 9 January 2012, Skiverton stood down as manager, with former Yeovil boss Gary Johnson returning for his second spell in charge. Skiverton took on the role of assistant manager.

On 4 February 2015, after Johnson was relieved of his role as manager Skiverton was once again promoted back to acting first team manager. After only winning two of his thirteen matches in charge Skiverton was demoted back to assistant manager with the club appointing Paul Sturrock as the club's new first team manager.

On 15 January 2022, Skiverton left his position assistant manager at Yeovil Town.

=== Charlton Athletic ===
On 18 January 2022, Skiverton was appointed as First-Team Coach at Charlton Athletic. On 3 May, Skiverton left his role at Charlton following the departure of manager Johnnie Jackson on the same day.

=== AFC Wimbledon ===
On 16 May 2022, Skiverton was appointed as assistant manager at AFC Wimbledon, joining his former Charlton manager Johnnie Jackson at the club.

== Personal life ==
While at Welling, and at Yeovil until the club turned professional, Skiverton appeared on Dream Team on the staff of Harchester United.

== Managerial statistics ==
As of 9 April 2015

Team	From	To	Record				
Team	From	To	G	W	D	L	Win %^{[A]}
Yeovil Town	18 February 2009	9 January 2012	144	38	41	65	26.39
Yeovil Town	4 February 2015	9 April 2015	13	2	2	9	15.38
Total			157	40	43	74	25.48

== Honours ==
Yeovil Town

- Football League Two: 2004–05
- Football Conference: 2002–03
- FA Trophy: 2001–02

Individual

- Football Conference Team of the Year: 2002–03
- PFA Team of the Year: 2006–07 League One
