= 2007–08 Bristol City F.C. season =

Bristol City
2007–08 season
- Chairman: Steve Lansdown
- Manager: Gary Johnson
- Stadium: Ashton Gate
- Championship: 4th (qualified for playoffs)
- Play-offs: Runners-up
- FA Cup: Third round
- League Cup: Second round
- Top goalscorer: Byfield (8)
- Average home league attendance: 16,275
Home colours	Away colours

During the 2007–08 English football season, Bristol City F.C. competed in the Football League Championship, following promotion from League One the previous season.

== Season summary ==
In the summer between City's promotion and the start of the Championship season, Gary Johnson made a number of signings. However their pre-season form did not start well, losing 4–2 to Forest Green Rovers and 3–1 to Motherwell F.C. as the club trialed various players. However City got off to a good start going unbeaten for a number of matches and briefly topping the Championship after beating Coventry City 3–0. City then suffered a slight blip after losing 3–0 to Barnsley before beating several big teams, including Sheffield United (live on Sky Sports) and Southampton. In November, City's form dipped and they endured a run of 4 games without a win, including a 6–0 thrashing at the hands of Ipswich Town. In December, City's form picked up again and went unbeaten all the way to Boxing Day, when they lost to West Bromwich Albion 4–1.

After a stop-start run of form, including victories over Blackpool and Coventry City and losses to Queens Park Rangers and Crystal Palace, City went top of the Championship on 1 March, after a 2–1 home victory over Hull City. After some indifferent results, City went back to the top after a last-gasp winner from Steve Brooker, who was just returning from injury, in a 2–1 win over Norwich City. However a poor run ended City's chances of an automatic promotion place. On 4 May 2008, a 3–0 home win against Preston North End on the final day of the league season ensured a playoff place and a semi-final fixture against Crystal Palace. On 13 May 2008, a 4–2 aggregate win over Crystal Palace with goals from Lee Trundle and Michael McIndoe confirmed City's trip to Wembley, where they were beaten 1–0 by Hull City. At the end of the season, defender Bradley Orr and midfielder Marvin Elliott were both included in the PFA Team of the Year, while goalkeeper Adriano Basso was named the club's player of the season. Elliott was named the club's young player of the season.

== Kit ==
Bristol City's kit was manufactured by German company Puma and sponsored by Bristol Trade Centre. The club's away kit was all black with white trimmings and rendered in the same template as the home kit; the third kit featured black shorts, white shirts and black and white socks.

== Final league table ==
Pos	Team	Pld	W	D	L	GF	GA	GD	Pts	Promotion, qualification or relegation
2	Stoke City (P)	46	21	16	9	69	55	+14	79	Promotion to the Premier League
3	Hull City (O, P)	46	21	12	13	65	47	+18	75	Qualification for Championship play-offs
4	Bristol City	46	20	14	12	54	53	+1	74	Qualification for Championship play-offs
5	Crystal Palace	46	18	17	11	58	42	+16	71	Qualification for Championship play-offs
6	Watford	46	18	16	12	62	56	+6	70	Qualification for Championship play-offs

Updated to match(es) played on 4 May 2008. Source: The Football League
Rules for classification: 1) points; 2) goal difference; 3) number of goals scored.
(O) Play-off winners; (P) Promoted

== Results ==
Bristol City's score comes first

=== Legend ===
Win	Draw	Loss

=== Football League Championship ===
Date	Opponent	Venue	Result	Attendance	Scorers
11 August 2007	Queens Park Rangers	H	2–2	18,228	Johnson, Murray
18 August 2007	Blackpool	A	1–1	8,983	Murray
25 August 2007	Scunthorpe United	H	2–1	12,474	Trundle
1 September 2007	Sheffield Wednesday	A	1–0	17,559	B Wilson
15 September 2007	Coventry City	A	3–0	21,538	McIndoe, Konstantopoulos (own goal), Byfield
18 September 2007	West Bromwich Albion	H	1–1	16,571	Orr
22 September 2007	Burnley	H	2–2	14,079	Byfield (2)
29 September 2007	Preston North End	A	0–0	12,098	
2 October 2007	Barnsley	A	0–3	9,679	
6 October 2007	Sheffield United	H	2–0	13,071	Noble, McIndoe
20 October 2007	Norwich City	A	3–1	24,125	McIndoe, Murray, Trundle
24 October 2007	Southampton	H	2–1	18,326	Byfield, Sproule
27 October 2007	Stoke City	H	1–0	15,012	Elliott
3 November 2007	Wolverhampton Wanderers	A	1–1	26,094	Fontaine
6 November 2007	Charlton Athletic	H	0–1	15,420	
10 November 2007	Ipswich Town	A	0–6	22,020	
24 November 2007	Leicester City	H	0–2	15,040	
27 November 2007	Hull City	A	0–0	15,768	
1 December 2007	Watford	A	2–1	16,689	Showunmi, Byfield
4 December 2007	Ipswich Town	H	2–0	14,062	Elliott, Orr (pen)
8 December 2007	Plymouth Argyle	A	1–1	16,530	Timár (own goal)
15 December 2007	Cardiff City	H	1–0	15,753	Elliott
22 December 2007	Barnsley	H	3–2	16,588	Showunmi (2), Byfield
26 December 2007	West Bromwich Albion	A	1–4	27,314	Byfield
29 December 2007	Burnley	A	1–0	12,109	Vaskó
1 January 2008	Coventry City	H	2–1	15,899	Byfield, Elliott
12 January 2008	Colchester United	H	1–1	16,484	Sproule
19 January 2008	Crystal Palace	A	0–2	19,010	
26 January 2008	Blackpool	H	1–0	15,465	Elliott
2 February 2008	Queens Park Rangers	A	0–3	16,502	
9 February 2008	Sheffield Wednesday	H	2–1	15,520	Adebola, Orr
12 February 2008	Scunthorpe United	A	1–0	5,423	Orr
18 February 2008	Crystal Palace	H	1–1	16,446	McCombe
23 February 2008	Colchester United	A	2–1	5,609	Adebola, McIndoe
1 March 2008	Hull City	H	2–1	15,859	Adebola, McCombe
4 March 2008	Charlton Athletic	A	1–1	24,075	McCombe
8 March 2008	Leicester City	A	0–0	22,616	
11 March 2008	Watford	H	0–0	19,026	
15 March 2008	Plymouth Argyle	H	1–2	19,011	Trundle (pen)
22 March 2008	Cardiff City	A	1–2	16,458	Adebola
29 March 2008	Norwich City	H	2–1	17,511	Adebola, Brooker
5 April 2008	Southampton	A	0–2	22,890	
12 April 2008	Wolverhampton Wanderers	H	0–0	19,332	
19 April 2008	Stoke City	A	1–2	24,475	Adebola
26 April 2008	Sheffield United	A	1–2	29,787	McIndoe (pen)
4 May 2008	Preston North End	H	3–0	19,169	Trundle, McIndoe, Noble

=== Championship play-offs ===
Round	Date	Opponent	Venue	Result	Attendance	Goalscorers
SF 1st Leg	10 May 2008	Crystal Palace	A	2–1	22,869	Carey, Noble
SF 2nd Leg	13 May 2008	Crystal Palace	H	2–1 (a.e.t.)	18,842	Trundle, McIndoe
F	24 May 2008	Hull City	N	0–1	86,703	

=== FA Cup ===
Round	Date	Opponent	Venue	Result	Attendance	Goalscorers
R3	5 January 2008	Middlesbrough	H	1–2	15,895	Fontaine

=== League Cup ===
Round	Date	Opponent	Venue	Result	Attendance	Goalscorers
R1	14 August 2007	Brentford	A	3–0	2,213	Elliott, Jevons (2)
R2	29 August 2007	Manchester City	H	1–2	14,541	Orr

== Squad statistics ==
Numbers in parentheses denote appearances as substitute.
Players with squad numbers struck through and marked † left the club during the playing season.
Players with names in italics and marked * were on loan from another club for the whole of their season with Bristol City.
Players listed with no appearances have been in the matchday squad but only as unused substitutes.
Key to positions: GK – Goalkeeper; DF – Defender; MF – Midfielder; FW – Forward

No.	Pos.	Nat.	Name	Apps	Goals	Apps	Goals	Apps	Goals	Apps	Goals	Apps	Goals	Yellow card	Red card
No.	Pos.	Nat.	Name	League		FA Cup		League Cup		Play-offs		Total		Discipline	
1	GK	BRA	Adriano Basso	44	0	1	0	0	0	3	0	48	0	0	0
2	MF	ENG	Bradley Orr	42	4	1	0	1 (1)	1	3	0	47 (1)	5	5	2
3	DF	SCO	Jamie McAllister	40 (1)	0	1	0	2	0	3	0	46 (1)	0	9	1
4	DF	ENG	Liam Fontaine	32 (6)	1	1	1	2	0	1 (2)	0	36 (8)	2	7	0
5	DF	ENG	Jamie McCombe	25 (9)	3	0	0	0	0	2	0	27 (9)	3	3	0
6	DF	SCO	Louis Carey	33	0	0	0	1	0	3	1	37	1	5	0
7	MF	SCO	Scott Murray	4 (10)	3	0 (1)	0	2	0	0	0	6 (11)	3	0	0
8	MF	ENG	David Noble	10 (16)	2	1	0	0	0	3	1	14 (16)	3	3	0
9	FW	ENG	Steve Brooker	1 (3)	1	0	0	0	0	0	0	1 (3)	1	0	0
~~10~~ †	FW	ENG	Phil Jevons	0 (2)	0	0	0	1 (1)	2	0	0	1 (3)	2	0	0
10	MF	AUS	Nick Carle	14 (3)	0	0	0	0	0	3	0	17 (3)	0	2	0
11	MF	SCO	Michael McIndoe	45	6	0	0	1	0	3	1	49	7	3	0
14	MF	ENG	Cole Skuse	5 (20)	0	0	0	0 (1)	0	0	0	5 (21)	0	1	0
15	FW	NGA	Enoch Showunmi	10 (7)	3	0 (1)	0	1	0	0	0	11 (8)	3	1	0
16	DF	IRL	Richard Keogh	0	0	0	0	1	0	0	0	1	0	0	0
17	MF	ENG	Alex Russell	1	0	0	0	1	0	0	0	2	0	0	0
18	DF	ENG	Brian Wilson	16 (2)	1	1	0	1	0	0	0	18 (2)	1	1	0
19	DF	HUN	Tamás Vaskó *	8 (11)	1	1	0	1	0	0	0	10 (11)	1	3	0
20	MF	ENG	Kevin Betsy	0 (1)	0	0	0	1	0	0	0	1 (1)	0	1	0
22	GK	ENG	Chris Weale	2 (1)	0	0	0	2	0	0	0	4 (1)	0	0	0
23	FW	ENG	Lee Trundle	21 (14)	5	0 (1)	0	1 (1)	0	3	1	25 (16)	6	2	0
24	DF	WAL	Christian Ribeiro	0	0	0	0	0	0	0	0	0	0	0	0
25	MF	ENG	Marvin Elliott	44 (1)	5	1	0	2	1	3	0	50 (1)	6	3	0
29	MF	NIR	Ivan Sproule	31 (9)	2	1	0	0 (1)	0	0 (2)	0	32 (12)	2	6	0
32	GK	IRL	Stephen Henderson	0 (1)	0	0	0	0	0	0	0	0 (1)	0	0	0
33	MF	ENG	Lee Johnson	39 (1)	1	1	0	1	0	0 (3)	0	41 (4)	1	4	0
34	FW	JAM	Darren Byfield	17 (16)	8	1	0	0	0	0 (1)	0	18 (17)	8	5	0
35	FW	NGA	Dele Adebola	16 (1)	6	0	0	0	0	3	0	19 (1)	6	2	0

Players not included in matchday squads
No.	Pos.	Nat.	Name
12	MF	ENG	Jennison Myrie-Williams
21	MF	ENG	Frankie Artus
26	DF	WAL	James Wilson
27	DF	ENG	Jordan Walker
39	DF	ENG	Christopher Venn
30	MF	ENG	Tristan Plummer
~~34~~ †	DF	WAL	David Partridge
