= 2010–11 Bristol City F.C. season =

Bristol City
2010–11 season
- Chairman: Steve Lansdown
- Manager: Gary Johnson (until 18 March 2010), Steve Coppell (until 12 August 2010), Keith Millen (from 12 August 2010)
- Football League Championship: 15th
- FA Cup: Third round vs Sheffield Wednesday
- Football League Cup: First round vs Southend United
- Top goalscorer: League: Brett Pitman (11); All: Brett Pitman (11)
- Highest home attendance: 18,308 vs Millwall, 7 August 2010
- Lowest home attendance: 13,376 vs Sheffield United, 27 November 2010
- Average home league attendance: 14,693
Home colours	Away colours	Third colours

The 2010–11 football season was Bristol City's 113th season as a professional football club and fourth consecutive season in the second division. They competed in the Football League Championship having finished in tenth position the previous season. It was Steve Coppell's first season in charge of the club, though he resigned as manager on 12 August 2010 after just one league game in charge. Assistant Keith Millen became the club's new manager on a three-year deal, and it was his first job as a manager.

== Season review ==
1 July – Defender Jamie McCombe joined Huddersfield Town for an undisclosed fee on a three-year contract.

1 July – Barnet winger Albert Adomah joined on a three-year contract.

9 July – Reading midfielder Kalifa Cissé joined for an undisclosed fee on a three-year deal.

17 July – City set a new club record by beating Swedish team Vallens IF, 11–1 in a pre-season friendly.

20 July – Trialist, John O'Flynn left Ashton Gate after not being offered a contract.

21 July – Ex-Peterborough United defender, Tom Williams had a trial at Ashton Gate.

23 July – City took on former City youth player and ex-Reading, Liam Rosenior on a trial.

24 July – Trialist Liam Rosenior left Ashton Gate less than 24 hours after re-joining them.

24 July – Manager, Steve Coppell, confirmed that defender Bradley Orr and midfielder Paul Hartley were to leave the club. Orr had spent more than 6 years with City and Hartley only 1.

26 July – Former Grays Athletic striker, Charlie Taylor was handed a trial with City.

28 July – Aberdeen confirmed the signing of Paul Hartley on a two-year contract making him their new club captain.

30 July – City signed Bolton Wanderers defender Nicky Hunt on a two-year deal and QPR defender Damion Stewart on a three-year deal.

30 July – Defender, Bradley Orr left on an undisclosed fee for fellow Championship side QPR.

30 July – England International goalkeeper, David James signed a one-year deal with a view to a further year.

7 August – Trialist Tom Williams signed a 6-month contract and Welsh international Sam Vokes signed a 6-month loan deal from Premier League side Wolverhampton Wanderers.

10 August – Bristol City confirmed that striker Nicky Maynard would undergo surgery on his injured knee and that his return date was unknown. On 12 August, he was ruled out for 3–4 months after having surgery on his injured knee.

12 August – Manager Steve Coppell resigned from his position with immediate effect and assistant Keith Millen is placed in charge on a three-year deal.

12 August – City signed Irish 19-year-old pair, Jimmy Keohane and Patrick Hoban on one-year deals.

18 August – City appointed former Southampton manager, Steve Wigley as assistant manager on a one-year-rolling contract.

23 August – City complete the signings of Ipswich Town forward Jon Stead and AFC Bournemouth striker Brett Pitman both on a three-year contracts.

27 August – Striker John Akinde joined City's rivals Bristol Rovers on a loan deal until 31 December 2010.

9 September – City signed Tottenham Hotspur winger Danny Rose on a youth loan deal until the end of the season. City also let defender Joe Edwards join Bath City on a youth loan deal until the end of the season and let midfielder Gavin Williams join former club Yeovil Town on a 93-day loan deal. Striker, Peter Styvar also had his contract terminated with immediate effect.

16 September – Striker Marlon Jackson joins Aldershot Town on a month loan.

17 September – Goalkeeper Stephen Henderson joins Yeovil Town on a month loan deal.

26 September – Tottenham Hotspur defender Steven Caulker signed on a youth loan deal until the end of the season.

30 September – Summer signing Tom Williams joins Colchester United on a loan deal until January and is told he will not be offered a contract beyond January.

1 October – 31 January – City had a torrid start to the season losing manager Steve Coppell after two games and hitting bottom of the Championship, things were looking bad for City. But from November until the end of December, City had a good run hitting 16th in the table and beating archrivals Cardiff City 3–0 at home. Keith Millen won manager of the month for November and defender Steven Caulker won young player of the month. City had a poor start to 2011 losing in the FA Cup 0–3 to Sheffield Wednesday and losing 0–4 also at home to Middlesbrough.

=== League ===
Bristol City opened their Championship campaign at home to newly promoted Millwall. The game saw goalkeeper David James make his home debut for the Robins. At half time, City were 1–0 down and by the end of the 90 minutes, City lost 3–0. The game saw Darren Carter sent off for Millwall, Damion Stewart sent off for City and Sam Vokes was stretchered off 13 minutes after coming on, to make his debut for City in the 2nd half. Then manager, Steve Coppell said that he may be out of action for a long period of time.
In August City went on to record 2 draws and 2 losses. However City recorded their first win of the season away on 11 September 2010, to Scunthorpe United in a 0–2 result with Albert Adomah and David Clarkson scoring the goals. City hit bottom of the Championship table on 2 October 2010 after losing 0–3 at home to Norwich. This was the first time they had been bottom since joining the Championship. City won their first game at home to Reading on 19 October 2010. This sparked an unbeaten run of five games, drawing against QPR and Preston and beating Swansea and Middelsbrough. Up to 3 December 2010, City lost one game in 8, losing to Leeds United at Elland Road 3–2 on 13 November 2010.

=== League Cup ===
City were drawn against League Two side Southend United away at Roots Hall. City began the game well with a goal inside the 2nd minutes, from left back Jamie McAllister. Southend drew level with a soft penalty from striker Matt Paterson on the 31st minute. City took the lead again in the second half 8 minutes from time with a well taken goal from Irish international Ivan Sproule. City again could not hold the lead and with 2 minutes left, Barry Corr sent the game into extra-time. Southend took the lead on the 104th minute. This was manager Steve Coppell's second defeat as City manager and also his last game in charge of the club

=== F.A Cup ===
City played League 1 side Sheffield Wednesday, on 8 January 2011 at Ashton Gate losing 0–3.

=== Kits ===
City signed a four-year deal with Adidas. City used a simple template for the home kit. It consisted of the traditional red top, white shorts and red socks. The away kit used the same template as the home kit, but with shirt and short colours reversed. The top was white with red shorts and white socks. This could be mixed with the home kit if any changes are needed. The third kit was all black.

=== Events ===
On 17 July, City set a brand new club record beating Swedish fourth division side, Vallens IF 11–1 in a pre-season friendly. The game saw a hat-trick by John Akinde, braces from Ivan Sproule and David Clarkson and other goals from Marlon Jackson, Albert Adomah, Jamal Campbell-Ryce and trialist John O'Flynn. England goalkeeper, David James signed a one-year contract deal on 30 July 2010, surprising the footballing world.

On 12 August 2010, Steve Coppell resigned as manager with immediate effect. Assistant manager, Keith Millen, was placed in charge on a three-year deal. Coppell said he didn't feel committed to doing the job.

On 9 March 2011 chairman Steve Lansdown announced he would be stepping down as chairman at the start of the 2011–12 season allowing CEO, Colin Sexstone to take over as chairman.

== Football League Championship ==
=== Standings ===
Pos	Team	Pld	W	D	L	GF	GA	GD	Pts
13	Ipswich Town	46	18	8	20	62	68	−6	62
14	Watford	46	16	13	17	77	71	+6	61
15	Bristol City	46	17	9	20	62	65	−3	60
16	Portsmouth	46	15	13	18	53	60	−7	58
17	Barnsley	46	14	14	18	55	66	−11	56

Updated to match(es) played on 7 May 2011. Source: The Football League
Rules for classification: 1) points; 2) goal difference; 3) number of goals scored.

== Squad ==
As of 31 January 2011

Note: Flags indicate national team as defined under FIFA eligibility rules; some limited exceptions apply. Players may hold more than one non-FIFA nationality.

No.	Pos.	Nation	Player
1	GK	ENG	David James
2	DF	ENG	Nicky Hunt
3	DF	SCO	Jamie McAllister
4	DF	ENG	Liam Fontaine
5	MF	MLI	Damion Stewart
6	DF	SCO	Louis Carey (captain)
7	MF	ENG	Marvin Elliott
8	MF	ENG	Lee Johnson
9	FW	SCO	David Clarkson
10	FW	ENG	Nicky Maynard
11	MF	ENG	Martyn Woolford
12	GK	ENG	Dean Gerken
13	GK	IRL	Stephen Henderson (on loan to Yeovil Town F.C.)
14	MF	ENG	Cole Skuse (Vice Captain)
15	FW	IRL	Andy Keogh (on loan from Wolverhampton Wanderers F.C.)
16	FW	ENG	John Akinde

No.	Pos.	Nation	Player
17	MF	NIR	Ivan Sproule (on loan to Notts County F.C.)
18	DF	WAL	James Wilson
19	DF	WAL	Christian Ribeiro
20	MF	JAM	Jamal Campbell-Ryce
21	FW	ENG	Kalifa Cissé
22	DF	WAL	Lewin Nyatanga
23	DF	ENG	Joe Edwards
24	FW	ENG	Marlon Jackson
25	DF	ENG	Danny Ball
26	FW	ENG	Joe Lennox
27	MF	ENG	Albert Adomah
28	DF	ENG	Jordan Spence (on loan from West Ham United F.C.)
29	MF	IRL	Patrick Hoban
30	FW	ENG	Jon Stead
31	MF	IRL	Jimmy Keohane
34	FW	Jersey	Brett Pitman
36	DF	ENG	Steven Caulker (on loan from Tottenham Hotspur)

Players were either sold in January, had their loan spells ended or had their contracts terminated.

Note: Flags indicate national team as defined under FIFA eligibility rules; some limited exceptions apply. Players may hold more than one non-FIFA nationality.

No.	Pos.	Nation	Player
11	FW	ENG	Danny Haynes (sold to Barnsley F.C.)
15	MF	WAL	Gavin Williams (contract terminated)
28	DF	CYP	Tom Williams (contract terminated)
30	FW	SLO	Peter Styvar (contract terminated)
33	FW	WAL	Sam Vokes (loan from Wolverhampton Wanderers F.C. ended)
35	MF	ENG	Danny Rose (loan from Tottenham Hotspur ended)

=== Statistics ===
As of 1 June 2011

No.	Pos	Nat	Player	Total		Championship		FA Cup		League Cup	
No.	Pos	Nat	Player	Apps	Goals	Apps	Goals	Apps	Goals	Apps	Goals
1	GK	(England) ENG	David James	46	0	45	0	1	0	0	0
2	DF	(England) ENG	Nicky Hunt	8	0	6+1	0	0	0	1	0
3	DF	(Scotland) SCO	Jamie McAllister	35	2	33+1	1	0	0	1	1
4	DF	(England) ENG	Liam Fontaine	33	0	30+1	0	0+1	0	1	0
5	MF	(Jamaica) JAM	Damion Stewart	21	1	18+3	1	0	0	0	0
6	DF	(Scotland) SCO	Louis Carey	21	0	20+1	0	0	0	0	0
7	MF	(England) ENG	Marvin Elliott	48	8	46	8	1	0	0+1	0
8	MF	(England) ENG	Lee Johnson	22	1	14+6	1	1	0	1	0
9	FW	(Scotland) SCO	David Clarkson	36	7	17+17	7	0+1	0	1	0
10	FW	(England) ENG	Nicky Maynard	13	6	11+2	6	0	0	0	0
11	MF	(England) ENG	Martyn Woolford	15	0	10+5	0	0	0	0	0
12	GK	(England) ENG	Dean Gerken	2	0	1	0	0	0	1	0
14	MF	(England) ENG	Cole Skuse	32	1	25+5	1	1	0	1	0
15	FW	(Republic of Ireland) IRL	Andy Keogh	9	1	4+5	1	0	0	0	0
16	FW	(England) ENG	John Akinde	3	0	0+2	0	0	0	0+1	0
18	DF	(Wales) WAL	James Wilson	2	0	2	0	0	0	0	0
19	DF	(Wales) WAL	Christian Ribeiro	10	0	8+1	0	0+1	0	0	0
20	MF	(Jamaica) JAM	Jamal Campbell-Ryce	33	2	21+10	2	1	0	1	0
21	FW	(Mali) MLI	Kalifa Cissé	30	0	19+10	0	1	0	0	0
22	DF	(Wales) WAL	Lewin Nyatanga	21	1	18+2	1	1	0	0	0
23	DF	(England) ENG	Joe Edwards	3	0	1+1	0	1	0	0	0
24	FW	(England) ENG	Marlon Jackson	5	0	0+4	0	0	0	0+1	0
25	DF	(England) ENG	Danny Ball	0	0	0	0	0	0	0	0
26	FW	(England) ENG	Joe Lennox	0	0	0	0	0	0	0	0
27	MF	(England) ENG	Albert Adomah	48	5	45+1	5	1	0	1	0
28	DF	(England) ENG	Jordan Spence	11	0	11	0	0	0	0	0
29	FW	(Republic of Ireland) IRL	Patrick Hoban	0	0	0	0	0	0	0	0
30	FW	(England) ENG	Jon Stead	28	9	24+3	9	1	0	0	0
31	MF	(Republic of Ireland) IRL	Jimmy Keohane	0	0	0	0	0	0	0	0
33	MF	(England) ENG	Bobby Reid	1	0	0+1	0	0	0	0	0
34	FW	Jersey	Brett Pitman	40	13	21+18	13	1	0	0	0
36	DF	(England) ENG	Steven Caulker	30	2	29	2	1	0	0	0
Players sold, loaned out/loan ended or had their contract terminated after the start of the season:
11	FW	(England) ENG	Danny Haynes	13	1	10+3	1	0	0	0	0
13	GK	(Republic of Ireland) IRL	Stephen Henderson	0	0	0	0	0	0	0	0
15	MF	(Wales) WAL	Gavin Williams	1	0	0	0	0	0	1	0
17	MF	(Northern Ireland) NIR	Ivan Sproule	12	1	4+7	0	0	0	1	1
28	DF	(Cyprus) CYP	Tom Williams	1	0	0+1	0	0	0	0	0
30	FW	(Slovakia) SVK	Peter Styvar	0	0	0	0	0	0	0	0
33	FW	(Wales) WAL	Sam Vokes	1	0	0+1	0	0	0	0	0
35	MF	(England) ENG	Danny Rose	17	0	13+4	0	0	0	0	0

==== Disciplinary record ====
Number	Pos	Player	Championship		FA Cup		League Cup	
Number	Pos	Player	Yellow card	Red card	Yellow card	Red card	Yellow card	Red card
3	DF	Jamie McAllister	5	0	0	0	0	0
7	DF	Marvin Elliott	5	0	0	0	0	0
35	MF	Danny Rose	4	0	0	0	0	0
36	DF	Steven Caulker	4	0	0	0	0	0
1	GK	David James	2	1	0	0	0	0
5	DF	Damion Stewart	2	1	0	0	0	0
9	DF	David Clarkson	2	0	0	0	0	0
14	MF	Cole Skuse	2	0	0	0	0	0
17	MF	Ivan Sproule	2	0	0	0	1	0
20	MF	Jamal Campbell Ryce	2	0	0	0	0	0
21	MF	Kalife Cisse	2	0	0	0	0	0
31	ST	Brett Pitman	2	0	0	0	0	0
2	DF	Nicky Hunt	1	0	0	0	1	0
4	DF	Liam Fontaine	1	0	0	0	0	0
6	DF	Louis Carey	1	0	0	0	0	0
8	MF	Lee Johnson	1	0	0	0	1	0
19	DF	Christian Ribeiro	1	0	0	0	0	0
27	MF	Albert Adomah	1	0	0	0	0	0

==== Scorers ====
Number	Pos	Player	Total Goals
Number	Pos	Player	Goal
34	FW	Brett Pitman	10
9	FW	David Clarkson	7
7	MF	Marvin Elliott	6
30	FW	John Stead	6
27	MF	Albert Adomah	4
10	FW	Nicky Maynard	3
3	DF	Jamie McAllister	2
36	DF	Steven Caulker	2
5	DF	Damion Stewart	1
8	MF	Lee Johnson	1
11	FW	Danny Haynes	1
15	FW	Andy Keogh	1
17	FW	Ivan Sproule	1
20	MF	Jamal Campbell Ryce	1
22	DF	Lewin Nyatanga	1
2	DF	Greg Halford scored own goal for City v Portsmouth F.C.	1

== Current management ==
Position	Name	Nationality
Manager:	Keith Millen	(England) English
Assistant manager:	Steve Wigley	(England) English
Development coach:	Alan Walsh	(England) English
Chief scout:	Dave Lee	(England) English
Goalkeeping coach:	Stuart Naylor	(England) English
Fitness/conditioning coach:	Glen Schmidt	(England) English
Head physiotherapist:	Nick Dawes	(England) English
Academy director:	John Clayton	(Scotland) Scottish

== Transfers ==
=== Transfers in ===
Date	Player	Club	Fee	Ref.
1 July 2010	Albert Adomah	Barnet	£350,000 (Note: Fee was structured as £150,000+£200,000 on 75appearances, £100,000 if City win promotion and a 20per cent sell-on clause)	
9 July 2010	Kalifa Cissé	Reading	Undisclosed	
30 July 2010	Nicky Hunt	Bolton Wanderers	Free	
30 July 2010	Damion Stewart	QPR	Undisclosed	
30 July 2010	David James	Free agent	Free	
5 August 2010	Tom Williams	Free agent	Free	
12 August 2010	Jimmy Keohane	Wexford Youths	Free	
12 August 2010	Patrick Hoban	Mervue United	Free	
23 August 2010	Jon Stead	Ipswich Town	Undisclosed	
23 August 2010	Brett Pitman	AFC Bournemouth	Undisclosed	
31 January 2011	Martyn Woolford	Scunthorpe	Undisclosed	

=== Loaned in ===
Date from	Player	Club	Duration	Ref.
5 August 2010	Sam Vokes	Wolverhampton Wanderers	6-month loan	
9 September 2010	Danny Rose	Tottenham Hotspur	Until 22 February 2011	
26 September 2010	Steven Caulker	Tottenham Hotspur	Season long loan	
31 January 2011	Andy Keogh	Wolverhampton Wanderers	93 Day Loan	
3 March 2011	Jordan Spence	West Ham United	28 Day Loan	

=== Loaned out ===
Date	Player	Club	Duration	Ref.
27 August 2010	John Akinde	Bristol Rovers	6-month loan	
9 September 2010	Joe Edwards	Bath City	Season long loan	
9 September 2010	Gavin Williams	Yeovil Town	93 day loan	
16 September 2010	Marlon Jackson	Aldershot Town	1-month loan	
17 September 2010	Stephen Henderson	Yeovil Town	1-month loan	
30 September 2010	Tom Williams	Colchester United	3-month loan	
1 November 2010	Lewin Nyatanga	Peterborough United	1-month loan	
22 November 2010	Ivan Sproule	Yeovil Town	1-month loan	
4 January 2011	Stephen Henderson	Yeovil Town	6-month loan	
17 January 2011	John Akinde	Dagenham & Redbridge	6-month loan	
4 March 2011	Ivan Sproule	Notts County	1-month loan	

=== Transfers out ===
- * Indicates the player joined the club after being released.

Date	Player	Club	Fee	Ref.
30 June 2010	Frankie Artus	Cheltenham Town*	Free	
30 June 2010	Steve Collis	Peterborough United*	Free	
30 June 2010	Ashley Kington		Released	
30 June 2010	Tristan Plummer		Released	
30 June 2010	Lee Trundle	Neath*	Free	
30 June 2010	Brian Wilson	Colchester United*	Free	
1 July 2010	Jamie McCombe	Huddersfield Town	Undisclosed	
28 July 2010	Paul Hartley	Aberdeen	Free	
30 July 2010	Bradley Orr	QPR	Undisclosed	
9 September 2010	Peter Štyvar		Contract terminated	
5 January 2011	Tom Williams		Contract terminated	
20 January 2011	Danny Haynes	Barnsley	Undisclosed	
2 February 2011	Gavin Williams	Bristol Rovers*	Contract terminated	

== Fixtures and results ==
=== Pre-season ===
13 July 2010	IFK Göteborg	1–1	Bristol City	Gamla Ullevi
19:00	Hysén		Adomah	Attendance: 1,318

15 July 2010	Helsingborgs IF	4–0	Bristol City	Olympia
18:00	Andersson; Gashi; Lindström; Makondele			Attendance: 600

17 July 2010	Vallens IF	1–11	Bristol City	N/A
16:00	Nilsson 74'		O'Flynn 11'; Campbell-Ryce 17'; Clarkson 40', 45'; Jackson 50'; Akinde 62', 70', 85'; Adomah 64'; Sproule 78', 89'	Attendance: 422

21 July 2010	Torquay United	2–1	Bristol City	Plainmoor
19:45	Mansell 64'; Ellis 75'		Clarkson 55'	Attendance: 1,081

24 July 2010	Aldershot Town	3–0	Bristol City	Recreation Ground
15:00	Morgan; Small			Attendance: 1,048

26 July 2010	Exeter City	3–1	Bristol City	St James Park
19:45	Nardiello; Harley 44'		Akinde 61'	Attendance: 2,791

28 July 2010	Yeovil Town	1–3	Bristol City	Huish Park
19:45	S. Williams 6' (pen.)		Sproule 15'; Clarkson 59' (pen.); Jackson 88'	Attendance: 1,744

31 July 2010	Bristol City	2–0	Blackpool	Ashton Gate Stadium
15:00	Sproule 21'; Clarkson 24'			Attendance: 4,629

3 August 2010	Clevedon Town	5–2	Bristol City	Hand Stadium
19:45	N/A		Bryon; S.Wilson	Attendance: 480

=== League ===
7 August 2010	Bristol City	0–3	Millwall	Ashton Gate
15:00	Stewart (yellow card) 68' (yellow-red card) 90+2'	Report	Ward 42'; Schofield 48'; Robinson 60'; Carter (yellow card) 41' (yellow-red card) 62'	Attendance: 18,308

14 August 2010	Doncaster Rovers	1–1	Bristol City	Keepmoat Stadium
15:00	Sharp 90' (pen.); Sharp (yellow card) 90'	Report	Stewart 49'; Sproule (yellow card) 60'; G. Williams (yellow card) 80'	Attendance: 9,291

21 August 2010	Bristol City	3–3	Barnsley	Ashton Gate
15:00	Elliott 19'; Adomah 21'; Clarkson 62' (pen.)	Report	Gray 4' (pen.), 12'; Hammill 51'; Diego Arismendi (yellow card) 45+1'	Attendance: 13,585

28 August 2010	Ipswich Town	2–0	Bristol City	Portman Road
15:00	Priskin 59'; Scotland 74'	Report	Sproule (yellow card) 52'	Attendance: 19,011

11 September 2010	Scunthorpe United	0–2	Bristol City	Glanford Park
15:00	Canavan (yellow card) 43'; O'Connor (yellow card) 82'	Report	Adomah 16'; Clarkson (yellow card) 77'; Elliott (yellow card) 82'; Clarkson 90+5'	Attendance: 5,187

14 September 2010	Bristol City	0–2	Watford	Ashton Gate
19:45	Hunt (yellow card) 26'		Sordell 3'; Cowie (yellow card) 31'; Mutch (yellow card) 45+1'; Graham 47'	Attendance: 13,998

17 September 2010	Bristol City	1–2	Coventry City	Ashton Gate
15:00	Elliott 42'; Skuse (yellow card) 55'		Platt 22'; Jutkiewicz (yellow card) 43'; Turner 45'; Turner (yellow card) 68'; Gunnarsson (yellow card) 77'	Attendance: 13,428

25 September 2010	Burnley	0–0	Bristol City	Turf Moor
15:00	McAllister (yellow card) 37'; Rose (yellow card) 79'		Rodriguez (yellow card) 1'; Bikey (yellow card) 13'; Thompson (yellow card) 76'	Attendance: 14,540

28 September 2010	Portsmouth	3–1	Bristol City	Fratton Park
17:45	Stead 53' Rose (yellow card) 73'	Report	Mokoena (yellow card) 25'; Utaka 51'; Mokoena 58'; Brown (yellow card) 74'; Mullins 90+4'	Attendance: 14,417; Referee: Hoorwood

2 October 2010	Bristol City	0–3	Norwich City	Ashton Gate
15:00	Skuse (yellow card) 34'		Jackson 23', 64'; Hoolahan 35' (pen.); Crofts (yellow card) 82'	Attendance: 14,124

16 October 2010	Cardiff City	3–2	Bristol City	Cardiff City Stadium
12:00	Bothroyd 12' (yellow card) 84'; Whittingham 46', 78'; McNaughton (yellow card) 61'; Chopra (yellow card) 81'		Caulker 6'; Stead 8'	Attendance: 22,444

19 October 2010	Bristol City	1–0	Reading	Ashton Gate
19:45	Haynes 28'; Carey (yellow card) 88'		Hunt (yellow card) 88'; Armstrong (yellow card) 90'	Attendance: 13,519

22 October 2010	Bristol City	1–1	Queens Park Rangers	Ashton Gate
19:45	Stead 16'; Rose (yellow card) 45'; Elliott (yellow card) 77'		Agyemang 84'; Walker (yellow card) 31'; Derry (yellow card) 36'; Gorkšs (yellow card) 66'; Faurlín (yellow card) 72'	Attendance: 14,552

30 October 2010	Middlesbrough	1–2	Bristol City	Riverside Stadium
15:00	Boyd 30'		Adomah 35'; Elliott 49'	Attendance: 19,039

6 November 2010	Bristol City	1–1	Preston North End	Ashton Gate
15:00	Jones 71' (o.g.); Elliott (yellow card) 34'		Hume 2'; Parkin (yellow card) 55'; Treacy (yellow card) 61'; St Ledger (yellow card) 73'; Davidson (yellow card) 90'	Attendance: 14,429

10 November 2010	Swansea City	0–1	Bristol City	Liberty Stadium
19:45	Tate (yellow card) 72'		Stead 6'; McAllister (yellow card) 14'; Campbell-Ryce (yellow card) 42'	Attendance: 14,741

13 November 2010	Leeds United	3–1	Bristol City	Elland Road
15:00	Becchio 66', 70', 83'		Stead 68'; James (yellow card) 85'	Attendance: 27,567

20 November 2010	Bristol City	2–0	Leicester City	Ashton Gate
15:00	Pitman 57'; Clarkson 90'		Cunningham (yellow card) 56'	Attendance: 14,517

27 November 2010	Bristol City	3–0	Sheffield United	Ashton Gate
15:00	Pitman 6' (pen.), 34' (pen.); McAllister 62'; Rose (yellow card) 45'		Simonsen (yellow card) 34'; Taylor (yellow card) 74'; Cresswell (red card) 45'	Attendance: 13,376

11 December 2010	Bristol City	2–0	Derby County	Ashton Gate
15:00	Pitman 48', 68'; James (yellow card) 39'; McAllister (yellow card) 56'; Caulker (yellow card) 90'		Bueno (yellow card) 42'; Leacock (yellow card) 84'	Attendance: 14,029

18 December 2010	Hull City	2–0	Bristol City	KC Stadium
15:00	Simpson 13', 62'; Rosenior (yellow card) 30'; Ashbee (yellow card) 35'; Dawson (yellow card) 59'		Ribeiro (yellow card) 22'; Clarkson (yellow card) 23'	Attendance: 20,299

26 December 2010	Reading	4–1	Bristol City	Madejski Stadium
15:00	McAnuff 31'; Hunt 43'; Long 66', 89'; Armstrong (yellow card) 19'		Stead 15'; Elliott (yellow card) 22'; Skuse (yellow card) 35'; Stewart (yellow card) 43'; Caulker (yellow card) 55'; Rose (yellow card) 80'	Attendance: 19,293

28 December 2010	Bristol City	1–1	Crystal Palace	Ashton Gate
15:00	Pitman 90' (pen.); Cissé (yellow card) 66'; Caulker (yellow card) 67'		Danns 2'; Davis (yellow card) 16'; Wright (yellow card) 38'; Andrew (yellow card) 68'; Bennett (yellow card) 86'	Attendance: 15,760

1 January 2011	Bristol City	3–0	Cardiff City	Ashton Gate
15:00	Pitman 3'; Johnson (yellow card) 9' (goal) 39'; Campbell-Ryce 55' (yellow card) 56'; Cissé (yellow card) 59'; Adomah (yellow card) 60'		Chopra (yellow card) 71'	Attendance: 15,683

3 January 2011	Queens Park Rangers	2–2	Bristol City	Loftus Road
15:00	Faurlín 53'; Taarabt 85' (pen.); Orr (yellow card) 26'		Pitman 50' (yellow card) 76'; Caulker 90' (yellow card) 90'; Elliott (yellow card) 84'	Attendance: 15,618

15 January 2011	Bristol City	0–4	Middlesbrough	Ashton Gate
15:00	James (red card) 89'		Cissé 43' (o.g.); Lita 58', 90' (pen.); Robson 77'	Attendance: 13,699

22 January 2011	Crystal Palace	0–0	Bristol City	Selhurst Park
15:00				Attendance: 14,128

25 January 2011	Nottingham Forest	1–0	Bristol City	City Ground
19:45	Chambers 47'			Attendance: 19,694

1 February 2011	Bristol City	0–2	Swansea City	Ashton Gate
19:45			Pratley 10', 67'	Attendance: 14,366

5 February 2011	Preston North End	0–4	Bristol City	Deepdale
15:00			Keogh 5'; Clarkson 56', 65'; Pitman 85'	Attendance: 11,784

12 February 2011	Bristol City	0–2	Leeds United	Ashton Gate
15:00			Snodgrass 17'; Gradel 50'	Attendance: 18,000

18 February 2011	Leicester City	2–1	Bristol City	Walkers Stadium
19:45	Yakubu 21'; Waghorn 90'		Elliott 57'	Attendance: 28,768

22 February 2011	Watford	1–3	Bristol City	Vicarage Road
19:45	Cowie 19'		Maynard 32'; Elliott 69'; Pitman 90'

26 February 2011	Bristol City	2–0	Scunthorpe United	Ashton Gate
15:00	Clarkson 13'; Maynard 49'			Attendance: 14,423

5 March 2011	Coventry City	1–4	Bristol City	Ricoh Arena
15:00	Jutkiewicz 53'		Maynard 15'; Nyatanga 24'; Clarkson 44'; Elliott 82'	Attendance: 15,157

8 March 2011	Bristol City	2–1	Portsmouth	Ashton Gate
15:00	Adomah 40'; Halford 66' (o.g.)		Kitson 90+3'	Attendance: 13,886

14 March 2011	Norwich City	3–1	Bristol City	Carrow Road
19:45	Holt 2'; Lansbury 89'; Surman 90+1'		Adomah 65'	Attendance: 24,428

19 March 2011	Bristol City	2–0	Burnley	Ashton Gate
15:00	Pitman 43'; Maynard 70'			Attendance: 14,360

2 April 2011	Bristol City	1–0	Doncaster Rovers	Ashton Gate
15:00	Maynard 76'	Report		Attendance: 13,726

=== League Cup ===
10 August 2010 First round	Southend United	3–2 (a.e.t.)	Bristol City	Roots Hall
19:45	Paterson 31' (pen.), 104'; Grant (yellow card) 72'; Corr 88'; Spencer (yellow card) 90+1'; Simpson (yellow card) 120+1'		McAllister 2'; Hunt (yellow card) 74'; Sproule 82'; Johnson (yellow card) 90+3'; Sproule (yellow card) 120+2'	Attendance: 2,940; Referee: David Phillips

=== FA Cup ===
8 January 2011 Third round	Bristol City	0–3	Sheffield Wednesday	Ashton Gate
15:00			Teale 49'; Mellor 55'; Clinton Morrison 65'; O'Connor (yellow card) 21'	Attendance: 11,378; Referee: Darren Sheldrake

=== Reserve team friendlies ===
17 August 2010	Bristol City Reserves	1–1	Cheltenham Town	Bristol City Training Ground, Failand, Bristol
15:00	Jackson 77'		Shroot 62'	Attendance: Closed Doors

24 August 2010	Bristol City Reserves	4–1	Aldershot Town	Bristol City Training Ground, Failand, Bristol
15:00	Jackson 16'; Medjedoub 21'; Akinde 55'; Andrews		Spencer 20'	Attendance: Closed Doors

7 September 2010 Rob Cousins Testimonial	Paulton Rovers	0–6	Bristol City Reserves	Winterfield Road
19:30			Haynes; Keohane; Jackson x2 Carey; Clarkson	Attendance: 540

15 September 2010	Bristol City Reserves	2–1	Hereford United	Bristol City Training Ground, Failand, Bristol
15:00	Ribeiro; Haynes	Report	McQuilkin	Attendance: Closed Doors

== Season statistics ==
Overall

- Games played: 10
- Goals scored: 9
- Goals conceded: 19
- Clean sheets: 2
- Yellow cards: 15
- Red cards: 1
- Total home attendance: 59,319
- Total subs used: 24
- Fouls given: 102
- Fouls conceded: 123
- Youngest player: 18 years – Steven Caulker (against Portsmouth, 28 September 2010)
- Oldest player: 40 years – David James (against Millwall, 7 August 2010)

Football League Championship

- Games played: 9
- Goals scored: 7
- Goals conceded: 16
- Clean sheets: 2
- Yellow cards: 12
- Red cards: 1
- Subs used: 21
- Total home attendance: 59,319
- Fouls given: 85
- Fouls conceded: 99

FA Cup

- Games played: 0
- Goals scored: 0
- Goals conceded: 0
- Clean sheets: 0
- Yellow cards: 0
- Red cards: 0
- Subs used: 0
- Total home attendance: 0
- Fouls given: 0
- Fouls conceded: 0

Football League Cup

- Games played: 1
- Goals scored: 2
- Goals conceded: 3
- Clean sheets: 0
- Yellow cards: 3
- Red cards: 0
- Subs used: 3
- Total home attendance: n/a
- Fouls given: 17
- Fouls conceded: 24
