= 2008 Football League Championship play-off final =

Association football match in London

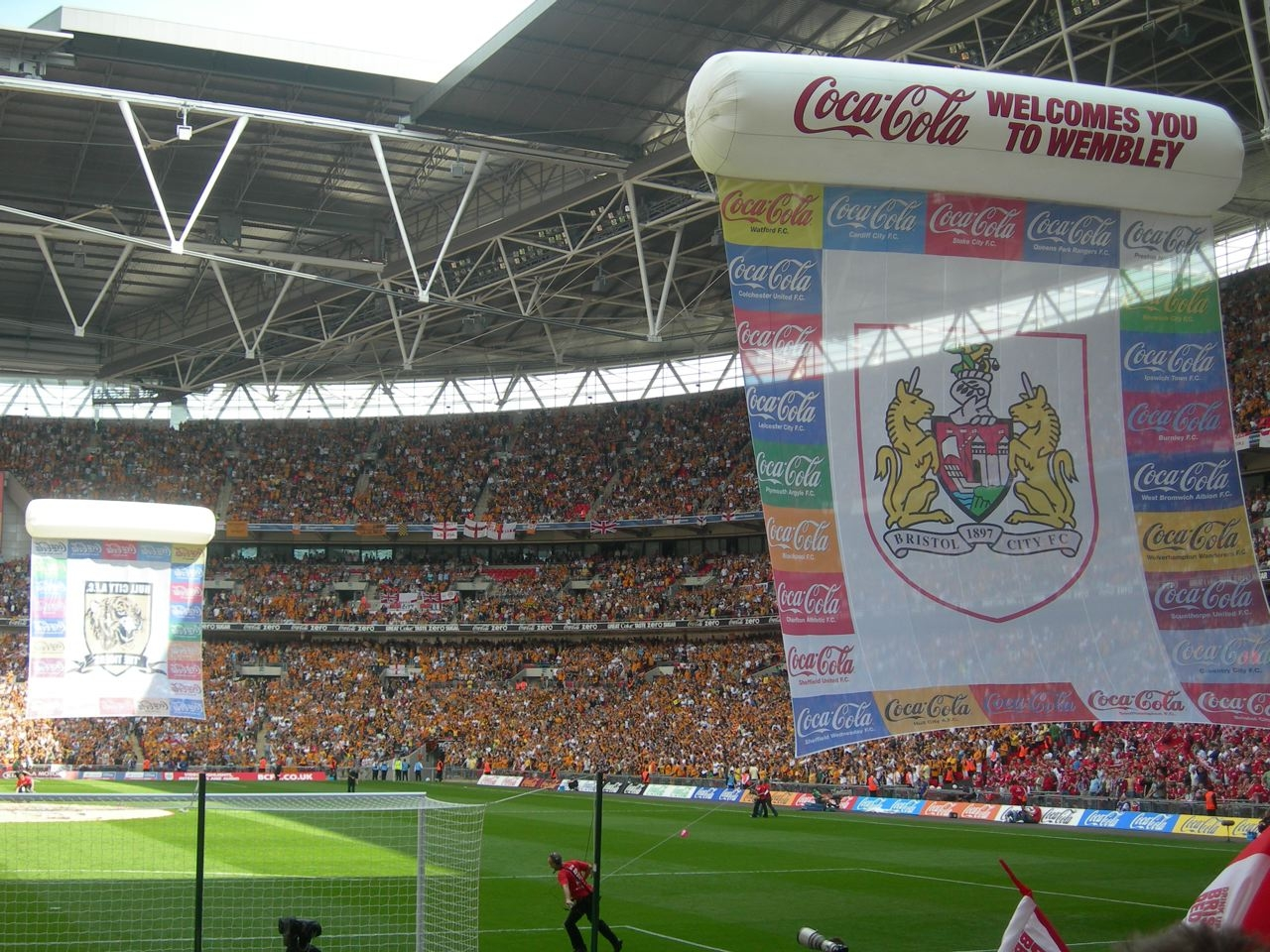
- The crests of Bristol City and Hull City, prior to the match
Bristol City	Hull City
0	1
- Date: 24 May 2008
- Venue: Wembley Stadium, London
- Man of the Match: Dean Windass
- Referee: Alan Wiley
- Attendance: 86,703
- Weather: Sunny

The 2008 Football League Championship play-off final was an association football match which was played on 24 May 2008 at Wembley Stadium, London, between Hull City and Bristol City. The match was to determine the third and final team to gain promotion from the Football League Championship, the second tier of English football, to the Premier League. The top two teams of the 2007–08 Football League Championship season gained automatic promotion to the Premier League, while the clubs placed from third to sixth place in the table partook in play-off semi-finals; Hull City ended the season in third position while Bristol City finished fourth. The winners of these semi-finals competed for the final place for the 2008–09 season in the Premier League. Winning the game was estimated to be worth up to £60 million to the successful team.

The 2008 final, refereed by Alan Wiley, was watched by a crowd of more than 86,000 people, in sunny and bright conditions. The match was won by Hull City 1–0, with the only goal of the game coming from Dean Windass in the first half. It was the first time that Hull City would play in the top tier of English football in their club's 104-year history.

Hull City ended the next season in 17th place in the Premier League, one point above relegation. Bristol City finished the following season in 10th place, thirteen points outside the play-offs.

== Route to the final ==
Football League Championship final table, leading positions
Pos	Team	Pld	W	D	L	GF	GA	GD	Pts
1	West Bromwich Albion	46	23	12	11	88	55	+33	81
2	Stoke City	46	21	16	9	69	55	+14	79
3	Hull City	46	21	12	13	65	47	+18	75
4	Bristol City	46	20	14	12	54	53	+1	74
5	Crystal Palace	46	18	17	11	58	42	+16	71
6	Watford	46	18	16	12	62	56	+6	70

Hull City finished the regular 2007–08 season in third place in the Football League Championship, the second tier of the English football league system, one point and one place ahead of Bristol City. Both therefore missed out on the two automatic places for promotion to the Premier League and instead took part in the play-offs to determine the third promoted team. Hull City finished four points behind Stoke City (who were promoted in second place) and six behind league winners West Bromwich Albion.

Bristol City faced Crystal Palace in their play-off semi-final, the first leg of which took place at Selhurst Park on 10 May 2008. After a goalless first half, Louis Carey put City into the lead before he fouled José Fonte to concede a late penalty which was converted by Ben Watson. In injury time, David Noble's strike from 30 yards (27 m) beat Julián Speroni in the Palace goal, and the match ended 2–1 to City. The second leg, played at Ashton Gate, took place three days later. Palace took the lead and levelled the tie on aggregate through a Watson goal midway through the first half. His second-half penalty struck the post and no further goals were scored in regular time, taking the match into extra time. Lee Trundle scored towards the end of the first half and Michael McIndoe doubled City's advantage in the second half. The match finished 2–1 to City and they progressed to the final with a 4–2 aggregate victory.

In the other play-off semi-final, Hull City's opponents were Watford, with the first leg being played at Vicarage Road on 11 May 2008. Watford's Danny Shittu had an early goal disallowed and shortly after, Nick Barmby put Hull City ahead, with a sidefooted shot from a Fraizer Campbell pass. Campbell then hit the post from an Andy Dawson cross, but the rebound was picked up and guided into an empty net by Dean Windass, doubling Hull's lead. With thirty minutes of the match remaining, the referee Kevin Friend showed John Eustace a straight red card for an infraction after a tackle. Shittu was then substituted with an unspecified injury and the match ended 2–0. The second leg was played at the KC Stadium three days later. Darius Henderson opened the scoring on 12 minutes to halve Watford's deficit across the legs, but Barmby equalised before half time. Second-half goals from Caleb Folan, Richard Garcia and Nathan Doyle ensured a dominant win for Hull, 4–1 on the day and 6–1 on aggregate.

Hull City			Round	Bristol City
Opponent	Result	Legs	Semi-finals	Opponent	Result	Legs
Watford	6–1	2–0 away; 4–1 home		Crystal Palace	4–2	2–1 away; 2–1 (a.e.t.) home

== Match ==
=== Background ===
This was Bristol City's first Championship play-off final, but they had been losing finalists in the 1988 Football League Third Division play-off final, contested over two legs, and the 2004 Football League Second Division play-off final at the Millennium Stadium. Hull's only play-off experience came in the 2001 Third Division playoffs where they were eliminated in the semi-finals by Leyton Orient. During the regular season, the two sides played out a goalless draw at the KC Stadium in November 2007, while Bristol City won their home game 2–1. Bristol City had not lost a competitive match against Hull since 1985. Hull City had never played in the highest tier of English football, while Bristol City last featured in the top division during the 1979–80 Football League First Division season. Campbell was Hull's highest scorer with fifteen goals during the regular season, followed by Windass on eleven, while Dele Adebola was Bristol City's top marksman with ten. The match was reported to be worth around £60 million to the winning team.

The referee for the game was Alan Wiley of the Staffordshire Football Association. Before kick-off, both teams were presented to former Conservative Member of Parliament and Football League chairman Brian Mawhinney. Hull City's starting line-up remained unchanged from their semi-final second leg, while Bristol City's Jamie McCombe was ill and had to be replaced by Liam Fontaine.

=== First half ===
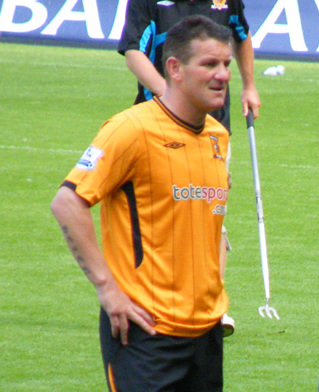
Dean Windass (pictured in 2009) scored the only goal of the game.

Hull City kicked the game off around 3 p.m. in front of a Wembley crowd of 86,703, in bright, sunny conditions. Their first attack saw Richard Garcia's shot fly high and wide of the Bristol City goal. At the other end, Adebola's shot was saved by Hull's goalkeeper Boaz Myhill. Bristol City were more dominant in the early stages and in the 17th minute, Adebola's pass found Nick Carle on the edge of the penalty area but his shot went narrowly wide. Garcia then headed a Sam Ricketts cross over Adriano Basso's goal. Midway through the half, Windass' chip from a Dawson cross landed on the roof of the net. In the 38th minute, Hull City took the lead. Adebola lost possession allowing Hull to counter attack, with Campbell's accurate cross being volleyed into the Bristol City goal from the edge of the area. A clash of head between Barmby and Bradley Orr resulted in a prolonged stop in play while the latter received treatment, including oxygen, for a suspected fractured cheekbone. Unable to continue, Orr was stretchered off with a neck brace in place, and substituted by Lee Johnson. After ten minutes of additional time, the referee Alan Wiley blew his whistle to signify the end of the first half, with Hull holding a 1–0 lead.

=== Second half ===
Bristol City got the second half underway and almost immediately, Carle's shot went wide. Soon after, Ricketts was adjudged to have handled the ball, allowing Noble a chance with a direct free kick but it was saved by Myhill. At the other end, a Garcia free kick was gathered by Bosso. McIndoe's free kick was deflected wide and the resulting corner was headed past the post by Trundle. In the 63rd minute, Bristol City made their second substitution of the afternoon, with Ivan Sproule coming on for Noble. Four minutes later, Hull made their first change of the match as Barmby was replaced by Craig Fagan and soon after Windass was substituted for Caleb Folan. In the 74th minute, Trundle's shot was saved by Myhill before a long-range strike from McIndoe was also stopped by the Hull goalkeeper. With 14 minutes of regular time remaining, Bristol City made their final change, with Darren Byfield replacing Carle. Sproule's foul on Fagan drew the first yellow card of the game in the 78th minute. Garcia's half-volley was struck straight at Bosso before Folan's shot was deflected. On 85 minutes, Myhill's weak punch allowed Trundle an opportunity to level the match but his shot was blocked by Michael Turner. Byfield then went close twice, but his header was over the Hull bar and his shot wide of the post. There were four minutes of additional time indicated, and with a minute remaining, Campbell received a booking for a foul on Fontain, before being replaced by Dean Marney. The game ended 1–0 to Hull who were promoted the top tier of English football for the first time in the club's 104-year history.

=== Details ===
24 May 2008
15:00 (BST)

Bristol City	0–1	Hull City
	(Report)	Windass 38'

Wembley Stadium, London
Attendance: 86,703
Referee: Alan Wiley (Staffordshire)

Bristol City	Hull City

GK	1	(Brazil) Adriano Basso
RB	2	(England) Bradley Orr		(substituted off) 45+3'
CB	6	(Scotland) Louis Carey (c)
CB	4	(England) Liam Fontaine
LB	3	(Scotland) Jamie McAllister
RM	8	(Scotland) David Noble		(substituted off) 63'
CM	25	(England) Marvin Elliott
CM	10	(Australia) Nick Carle		(substituted off) 76'
LM	11	(Scotland) Michael McIndoe
CF	35	(Nigeria) Dele Adebola
CF	23	(England) Lee Trundle
Substitutes:
GK	13	(England) Chris Weale
DF	19	(Hungary) Tamás Vaskó
MF	33	(England) Lee Johnson		(substituted on) 45+3'
MF	29	(Northern Ireland) Ivan Sproule	(yellow card) 77'	(substituted on) 63'
FW	34	(Jamaica) Darren Byfield		(substituted on) 76'
Manager:
(England) Gary Johnson

GK	1	(Wales) Boaz Myhill
RB	21	(Wales) Sam Ricketts
CB	15	(England) Wayne Brown
CB	6	(England) Michael Turner
LB	3	(England) Andy Dawson
RM	14	(Australia) Richard Garcia
CM	4	(England) Ian Ashbee (c)
CM	11	(England) Bryan Hughes
LM	8	(England) Nick Barmby		(substituted off) 67'
CF	25	(England) Fraizer Campbell	(yellow card) 90+3'	(substituted off) 90+3'
CF	9	(England) Dean Windass		(substituted off) 71'
Substitutes:
GK	12	(England) Matt Duke
DF	2	(England) Nathan Doyle
MF	22	(England) Dean Marney		(substituted on) 90+3'
FW	18	(Republic of Ireland) Caleb Folan		(substituted on) 71'
FW	23	(England) Craig Fagan		(substituted on) 67'
Manager:
(England) Phil Brown

Match rules:

- 90 minutes.
- 30 minutes of extra time if necessary.
- Penalty shoot-out if scores still level.
- Five named substitutes.
- Maximum of three substitutions.

=== Statistics ===
Statistics
	Bristol City	Hull City
Total shots	21	11
Shots on target	13	4
Ball possession	49%	51%
Corner kicks	2	1
Fouls committed	17	11
Offsides	3	1
Yellow cards	1	1
Red cards	0	0

== Post-match ==
Hull City manager Phil Brown said "It is very fitting that Dean Windass got the winning goal, I think it was written in the Gods that it would be Dean Windass or Nicky Barmby who would get the winner today.". Goalscorer Windass said that "It feels unbelievable. I don't think there is anyone left in Hull today looking at how many supporters we've got here." Hull City chairman Paul Duffen said "This is fantastic, I think it's amazing. It is something which means a lot to the city of Hull." Bristol City manager Gary Johnson congratulated Hull, and said that Bristol City would "bounce back" in the following years. Bristol City chairman Stephen Lansdown said that "It's been a great day out for Bristol City football club – it doesn't feel like it at the moment but the future's there and I think we've shown over the last few weeks what this football club can achieve."

Hull City ended the next season in 17th place in the Premier League, one point above the relegation zone. Bristol City finished the following season in 10th place, thirteen points outside the play-offs.
