= Darren Byfield =

English footballer (born 1976)

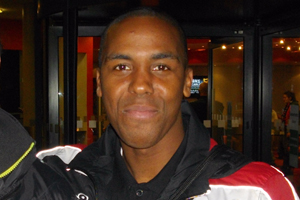
- Byfield in 2011

Personal information
- Full name: Darren Asherton Byfield
- Date of birth: 29 September 1976 (age 50)
- Place of birth: Sutton Coldfield, England
- Height: 5 ft 11 in (1.80 m)
- Position: Forward

Youth career
- Aston Villa

Senior career*
| Years | Team | Apps | (Gls) |
| 1997–2000 | Aston Villa | 7 | (0) |
| 1998–1999 | → Preston North End (loan) | 5 | (1) |
| 1999 | → Northampton Town (loan) | 6 | (1) |
| 1999 | → Cambridge United (loan) | 4 | (0) |
| 2000 | → Blackpool (loan) | 3 | (0) |
| 2000–2002 | Walsall | 77 | (13) |
| 2001 | → Rotherham United (loan) | 3 | (2) |
| 2002–2004 | Rotherham United | 65 | (20) |
| 2004 | Sunderland | 17 | (5) |
| 2004–2006 | Gillingham | 67 | (19) |
| 2006–2007 | Millwall | 31 | (16) |
| 2007–2008 | Bristol City | 33 | (8) |
| 2008–2009 | Doncaster Rovers | 15 | (0) |
| 2008–2009 | → Oldham Athletic (loan) | 8 | (1) |
| 2009 | Oldham Athletic | 3 | (0) |
| 2009–2011 | Walsall | 55 | (12) |
| 2012 | Solihull Moors | 2 | (0) |
| 2012 | AFC Telford United | 7 | (1) |
| 2013–2014 | Tamworth | 31 | (4) |
| 2014–2016 | Solihull Moors | 31 | (4) |
| 2016–2017 | Redditch United | 6 | (0) |
| Total | | 476 | (107) |

International career
| 2003 | Jamaica | 6 | (1) |

Managerial career
- 2016–2017: Redditch United
- 2018: Stratford Town
- 2018–2019: Walsall Wood
- 2019: Alvechurch
- 2020: Walsall Wood
- 2022–2023: Crawley Town (caretaker)
- 2026: Walsall (caretaker)
- * Club domestic league appearances and goals

Darren Asherton Byfield (born 29 September 1976) is a professional football manager and former player who was most recently the caretaker manager of EFL League Two club Walsall. A forward, Byfield scored 110 goals in 484 appearances across all domestic competitions in his playing career. Born in England, he won six caps for Jamaica in 2003.

He began his career with Aston Villa in 1997, and enjoyed loan spells with Preston North End, Northampton Town, Cambridge United, and Blackpool, before winning a move to Walsall in June 2000. He scored the winning goal in the 2001 Second Division play-off final, and then made a £50,000 move to Rotherham United in March 2002. He was traded to Sunderland in February 2004, and then moved on to Gillingham five months later. He transferred to Millwall in June 2006, before joining Bristol City in August 2007. He moved on to Doncaster Rovers in July 2008, before linking up with Oldham Athletic in August 2009, having played on loan at the club during the previous season. His stay at Oldham lasted only a handful of games, after which he returned to Walsall. He left the Football League in June 2011 following an injury-hit 2010–11 campaign. He joined non-league Solihull Moors for a brief spell in March 2012, before moving on to AFC Telford United six months later. He joined Tamworth in January 2013.

== Club career ==
Byfield started his career at Aston Villa, and graduated through the club's Academy to make his Premier League debut on 28 December 1997, in a 1–1 draw with Leeds United at Elland Road. Given his debut by outgoing boss Brian Little, he rarely featured under new "Villans" manager John Gregory. He made six further substitute appearances in 1997–98.

He appeared in the UEFA Cup in a 3–2 win over Norwegian outfit Strømsgodset IF at Villa Park on 15 September 1998. Byfield was loaned out to Preston North End in November 1998, and scored on his debut at Deepdale on 7 November, in a 4–1 win over Burnley. He played four further Second Division games for David Moyes's "Lilywhites", and did not feature in the latter half of the 1998–99 season.

He joined Northampton Town on a six-week loan in August 1999, and scored twice in seven games for the "Cobblers". After the departure of manager Ian Atkins, Kevin Wilson led the Sixfields outfit to promotion out of the Third Division. Byfield meanwhile joined Cambridge United on loan immediately after leaving Northampton, and featured four times at the Abbey Stadium under manager Roy McFarland. In March 2000 he joined Blackpool on loan, in his third such move of the 1999–2000 campaign. He played three Second Division games for Steve McMahon's "Seasiders", in a brief stay at Bloomfield Road.

In June 2000, Byfield signed with Ray Graydon's Second Division side Walsall. He hit 11 goals in 51 games in 2000–01, and scored the winning goal in the 109th minute of the play-off final, giving the "Saddlers" a 3–2 victory over Reading. He scored four goals in 37 First Division games in 2001–02, and left the Bescot Stadium soon after Colin Lee was appointed as manager.

In March 2002, he joined Rotherham United in a £50,000 deal. He got off to a flying start to his Millmoor career, hitting two goals in three games at the back end of the 2001–02 campaign. He scored 13 goals in 38 games in 2002–03, and told the media that "Even if the manager (Ronnie Moore) brought in Ruud van Nistelrooy and Alan Shearer it wouldn't bother me, I am very confident in my own abilities." His tally included four goals against Millwall on 10 August in a "stunning display" on the opening day of the season when the Millers ran out 6-0 victors at The Den, for which Byfiel was awarded Man of the Match by the home team's fans. He went on to bag eight goals in 33 appearances for the "Millers" in 2003–04.

After Rotherham rejected a bid from Derby County, he signed with Sunderland in February 2004, after the two clubs agreed to a trade for Michael Proctor. Byfield scored five goals in 17 games for Mick McCarthy's "Black Cats" in the latter half of the 2003–04 campaign, before departing the Stadium of Light at the end of the season.

Byfield signed a two-year contract with Championship club Gillingham in July 2004, after rejecting offers from former clubs Preston and Walsall. He hit just six goals in 39 appearances in 2004–05, despite maintaining an excellent work rate. The club suffered relegation into League One, as well as a merry-go-round of managers, with Andy Hessenthaler making way for Stan Ternent, who was in turn replaced by Neale Cooper and then Ronnie Jepson. Byfield told the press that his teammates should take the blame for Neale Cooper's departure in November 2005, and should be "ashamed" of their performances. Byfield scored 14 goals during the 2005–06 campaign, becoming the club's top-scorer, despite spending two months on the sidelines nursing a knee injury.

He joined Millwall in June 2006, despite manager Ronnie Jepson's best efforts to keep him at Priestfield. Byfield later claimed he was not offered a new contract by the "Gills", something which chairman Paul Scally denied. Scally had previously accused Southend United manager Steve Tilson of making an illegal approach for Byfield. Having scored a hat-trick at the start of the month, he was nominated for the League One player of the month award for January, but lost out to Bristol City's Enoch Showunmi. Despite missing the end of the campaign due to an ankle injury, he scored 16 goals in 31 League One games in 2006–07 to become the club's top-scorer. However, he seemed keen to move away from The Den, and did not appear in pre-season friendlies or photo opportunities. "Lions" boss Willie Donachie had previously rejected an offer of £165,000 from Brighton & Hove Albion chairman Dick Knight.

Byfield was signed by Bristol City for an undisclosed fee (in the region of £250,000) in August 2007. The Ashton Gate club exceeded all expectations in 2007–08, and top-scorer Byfield's eight goals helped them to secure a place in the Championship play-offs. However, the play-off final ended in defeat to Hull City at Wembley; Byfield was a late substitute for Nick Carle. In May 2008, Byfield was released by the "Robins", having struggled to secure a place in Gary Johnson's starting eleven after proving himself to be something of a "super-sub".

In July 2008, he joined Doncaster Rovers on a two-year deal. On 14 November, he joined Oldham Athletic on a one-month loan, which was later extended until January 2009. His "Latics" debut came in a 1–0 win over Northampton Town. Manager John Sheridan described Byfield's performance as "excellent", and stated that "he caused them a lot of problems with his pace and his touch". The only goal of his eight-game spell came on Boxing Day against Crewe Alexandra; he scored the opening goal in a 3–0 victory at the Alexandra Stadium. He returned to the Keepmoat Stadium at the end of the 2008–09 season, though sat out the end of the campaign after undergoing a hernia operation. He was released from his contract by manager Sean O'Driscoll on 7 May, having failed to find the net in 16 appearances for "Donny".

On 6 August 2009, Byfield joined Oldham Athletic on a short-term deal. However, after four appearances with no goals, he left Boundary Park on 25 August. Byfield re-signed with Walsall three days after leaving Oldham – to the delight of manager Chris Hutchings. He was given a contract lasting until January 2010, with an option to extend it until the end of the 2009–10 season. He formed an effective partnership with Troy Deeney, and won praise from coach Mick Kearns. Appointed club captain, he missed much of the 2010–11 season due to a knee injury, and was released by new manager Dean Smith in May 2011.

In March 2012 he signed for Solihull Moors. He featured in two Conference North games before the end of the 2011–12 season, in what was a brief stay at Damson Park. He joined League Two side Port Vale on trial in August 2012, and "proved he could still have something to offer with a busy performance" during a pre-season friendly with Nantwich Town. The "Valiants" were unable to offer him a contract due to financial problems, and Byfield instead signed a six-month deal with Conference club AFC Telford United in September, after manager Andy Sinton needed cover to deal with injuries. He moved on to Conference rivals Tamworth in January 2013, joining on non-contract terms. He scored two goals in 18 games for Dale Belford's "Lambs" in the 2012–13 season and two goals in 14 games in the 2013–14 season, before departing in May 2014 after the club were relegated out of the Conference Premier. In 2017 he signed for Monica Star, one of the oldest Sunday league clubs teaming up with three more ex-Premier League players, Lee Hendrie, Paul Devlin and Lee Carsley.

== International career ==
Though born in Birmingham, his Jamaican heritage allowed him to win six caps for Jamaica in 2003. He was a squad member for the 2003 CONCACAF Gold Cup. The "Reggaeboyz" exited the tournament at the quarter-finals with a 5–0 defeat to hosts Mexico.

== Management career ==
In May 2016, Byfield took up his first management position after taking over at Southern Premier Division side Redditch United. He remained registered as a player, making six league appearances during the 2016–17 season.

Byfield joined Stratford Town as manager in May 2018. However, he left the club in September and was subsequently appointed manager of Walsall Wood in October. In May 2019 he left Walsall Wood to become manager of Alvechurch in May 2019. Byfield returned to Walsall Wood in Jan 2020.

Byfield joined Crawley in the summer of 2022. In December 2022, Byfield took over as caretaker-manager at Crawley Town. He was in charge for two games, resulting in a 3-1 defeat against Stevenage on December 30th 2022 and a 2-2 draw against Newport County on 2nd January 2023. He then became first team coach under the new manager Scott Lindsey in January 2023.

In July 2023, Byfield returned to former club Walsall as a first-team coach. He was appointed caretaker manager in March 2026 following the sacking of Mat Sadler. On 18 March 2026 he was given the interim head coach job until the end of the season after two games as caretaker

== Personal life ==
He married pop singer Jamelia in June 2008, before the pair filed for divorce in November 2009. Together they had a daughter, Tiani, on 21 October 2005. During their relationship he was also step-father to Teja, was born in 2001. In contrast to the WAGs stereotype, Jamelia was considered to be a more famous celebrity than Byfield. This led to embarrassment for Byfield when Jamelia became engaged in a public spat with Alex Curran, wife of Steven Gerrard; Curran told OK! magazine that "[Jamelia will] be glad to know I don't know her boyfriend's name but Steven thinks he's lower than a non-league footballer." At the time of the quote Byfield was playing for Millwall F.C. of League One, the third highest tier of English football.

The couple divorced in November 2009, after 17 months of marriage.

== Career statistics ==
Appearances and goals by club, season and competition
| Club | Season | League | | | FA Cup | | League Cup | | Other | | Total | |
| Club | Season | Division | Apps | Goals | Apps | Goals | Apps | Goals | Apps | Goals | Apps | Goals |
|---|---|---|---|---|---|---|---|---|---|---|---|---|
| Aston Villa | 1997–98 | Premier League | 7 | 0 | 1 | 0 | 1 | 0 | 0 | 0 | 8 | 0 |
| Aston Villa | 1998–99 | Premier League | 0 | 0 | 0 | 0 | 0 | 0 | 1 | 0 | 2 | 0 |
| Aston Villa | 1999–2000 | Premier League | 0 | 0 | 0 | 0 | 0 | 0 | 0 | 0 | 0 | 0 |
| Aston Villa | Total | | 7 | 0 | 1 | 0 | 0 | 0 | 2 | 0 | 10 | 0 |
| Preston North End (loan) | 1998–99 | Second Division | 5 | 1 | 0 | 0 | 0 | 0 | 1 | 0 | 6 | 1 |
| Northampton Town (loan) | 1999–2000 | Third Division | 6 | 1 | 0 | 0 | 1 | 1 | 0 | 0 | 7 | 2 |
| Cambridge United (loan) | 1999–2000 | Second Division | 4 | 0 | 0 | 0 | 0 | 0 | 0 | 0 | 4 | 0 |
| Blackpool (loan) | 1999–2000 | Second Division | 3 | 0 | 0 | 0 | 0 | 0 | 0 | 0 | 3 | 0 |
| Walsall | 2000–01 | Second Division | 40 | 9 | 3 | 0 | 4 | 1 | 4 | 1 | 51 | 11 |
| Walsall | 2001–02 | First Division | 37 | 4 | 3 | 1 | 1 | 1 | 0 | 0 | 41 | 6 |
| Walsall | Total | | 77 | 13 | 6 | 1 | 5 | 2 | 4 | 1 | 92 | 17 |
| Rotherham United (loan) | 2001–02 | First Division | 3 | 2 | 0 | 0 | 0 | 0 | 0 | 0 | 3 | 2 |
| Rotherham United | 2002–03 | First Division | 37 | 13 | 0 | 0 | 1 | 0 | 0 | 0 | 38 | 13 |
| Rotherham United | 2003–04 | First Division | 28 | 7 | 2 | 0 | 3 | 1 | 0 | 0 | 33 | 8 |
| Rotherham United | Total | | 68 | 22 | 2 | 0 | 4 | 1 | 0 | 0 | 74 | 23 |
| Sunderland | 2003–04 | First Division | 17 | 5 | 0 | 0 | 0 | 0 | 0 | 0 | 17 | 5 |
| Gillingham | 2004–05 | Championship | 38 | 6 | 1 | 0 | 0 | 0 | 0 | 0 | 39 | 6 |
| Gillingham | 2005–06 | League One | 29 | 13 | 0 | 0 | 2 | 1 | 1 | 0 | 32 | 14 |
| Gillingham | Total | | 67 | 19 | 1 | 0 | 2 | 1 | 1 | 0 | 71 | 20 |
| Millwall | 2006–07 | League One | 31 | 16 | 4 | 0 | 0 | 0 | 1 | 0 | 36 | 16 |
| Bristol City | 2007–08 | Championship | 33 | 8 | 1 | 0 | 0 | 0 | 1 | 0 | 35 | 8 |
| Doncaster Rovers | 2008–09 | Championship | 15 | 0 | 1 | 0 | 0 | 0 | 0 | 0 | 16 | 0 |
| Oldham Athletic | 2008–09 | League One | 8 | 1 | 0 | 0 | 0 | 0 | 0 | 0 | 8 | 1 |
| Oldham Athletic | 2009–10 | League One | 3 | 0 | 0 | 0 | 0 | 0 | 1 | 0 | 4 | 0 |
| Oldham Athletic | Total | | 11 | 1 | 0 | 0 | 0 | 0 | 1 | 0 | 12 | 1 |
| Walsall (loan) | 2009–10 | League One | 36 | 10 | 2 | 0 | 1 | 0 | 1 | 0 | 40 | 10 |
| Walsall | 2010–11 | League One | 19 | 2 | 0 | 0 | 1 | 0 | 0 | 0 | 20 | 2 |
| Walsall | Total | | 55 | 12 | 2 | 0 | 2 | 0 | 1 | 0 | 60 | 12 |
| Solihull Moors | 2011–12 | Conference North | 2 | 0 | 0 | 0 | 0 | 0 | 0 | 0 | 2 | 0 |
| Telford United | 2012–13 | Conference National | 7 | 1 | 0 | 0 | 0 | 0 | 0 | 0 | 7 | 1 |
| Tamworth | 2012–13 | Conference Premier | 18 | 2 | 0 | 0 | 0 | 0 | 0 | 0 | 18 | 2 |
| Tamworth | 2013–14 | Conference Premier | 13 | 2 | 1 | 0 | 0 | 0 | 0 | 0 | 14 | 2 |
| Tamworth | Total | | 31 | 4 | 0 | 0 | 0 | 0 | 0 | 0 | 32 | 4 |
| Career total | | | 439 | 103 | 18 | 1 | 14 | 5 | 11 | 1 | 484 | 110 |

== Honours ==
Northampton Town

- Football League Third Division third-place promotion: 1999–2000

Walsall

- Football League Second Division play-offs: 2001
