= Adriano Basso =

Brazilian footballer (born 1975)

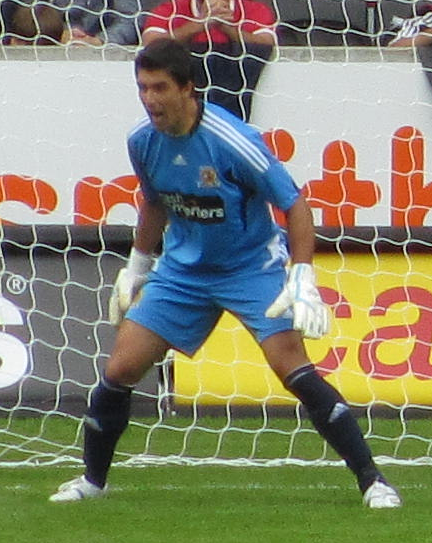
- Basso playing for Hull City in 2011

Personal information
- Full name: Adriano Basso
- Date of birth: 18 April 1975 (age 51)
- Place of birth: Jundiaí, Brazil
- Height: 6 ft 1 in (1.85 m)
- Position: Goalkeeper

Senior career*
Years	Team	Apps	(Gls)
1998–2002	Ponte Preta	63	(0)
2002–2003	Atlético Paranaense	13	(0)
2004–2005	Woking	25	(0)
2005–2010	Bristol City	165	(0)
2011	Wolverhampton Wanderers	0	(0)
2011–2012	Hull City	13	(0)
- Corinthians USA
2016	Truro City	8	(0)
2016–2017	FC United of Manchester	8	(0)
2017	FC United of Manchester	0	(0)
2017	Radcliffe Borough	2	(0)
2018–2019	Nuneaton Borough	0	(0)
Total		297	(0)
- * Club domestic league appearances and goals

Adriano Basso (born 18 April 1975) is a Brazilian former professional footballer who played as a goalkeeper and goalkeeper coach.

Basso began his playing career in his native Brazil before entering English league football with Bristol City for whom he remained for five years. After being released in 2010, he signed a short-term deal with Wolverhampton Wanderers the following year and then spent his last season at Hull City.

== Playing career ==
Basso previously played for Ponte Preta and Atlético Paranaense in his homeland before moving to England. He had an unsuccessful three-month trial with Arsenal before joining non-league sides St Albans City and Woking.

He eventually signed for League One side Bristol City shortly after the 2005–06 campaign had begun, making his first team debut against Swindon Town on 11 November 2005. He quickly established himself as the club's first choice goalkeeper and was part of the team that won promotion to the Championship in the following season, also being crowned BBC West's Footballer of the Year.

The 2007–08 season saw Basso come within one game of reaching the Premier League, but the Robins lost the Championship Play-off Final to Hull City.

He remained the club's number one for the following campaign that saw a mid-table finish, but in July 2009, it was reported that he had rejected a new contract and subsequently handed in a transfer request. Despite rumours of moves to other clubs in the close season, Basso remained at the club for the majority of the 2009–10 season, but made only four appearances, as relations soured between him and the club. On 5 March 2010, his contract was terminated, ending his five-year stay at the club.

Basso remained a free agent until 31 January 2011, when he joined Premier League side Wolverhampton Wanderers on a short-term contract until the end of the season, after having trained with the club for two weeks. Following the end of his contract at Wolves, Basso was a free agent for a short while before moving to Hull City on a one-year contract, with the option of a second in the club's favour, after a successful trial. He made his debut on 9 August 2011 at the KC Stadium in a 2–0 defeat by Macclesfield Town in the League Cup. He made his league debut on 20 August 2011 at the KC Stadium in a 1–0 defeat by Crystal Palace. He played for F.C. United of Manchester in the second half of their pre-season friendly versus Hereford F.C. at Broadhurst Park on Saturday 23 July 2016, but eventually he went on to sign for Truro City in August.

In December 2016, having been released by Truro City, Basso joined F.C. United of Manchester. He left the club in March 2017 to join Hartlepool United as a goalkeeper coach.

In August 2017, he rejoined FC United as goalkeeping cover. and also played for Radcliffe Borough.

== Coaching career ==
On 21 March 2017, Basso joined Hartlepool United as a goalkeeper coach. At the end of the season, Basso left the club.

Basso then joined Nuneaton Borough on 2 August 2018 as goalkeeper coach, but was also registered as a player. He was at the club until 6 February 2019, when he joined Grantham Town, also as a goalkeeper coach.

On 25 June 2021, he was appointed the new first team goalkeeper coach at Sheffield Wednesday. He left Sheffield Wednesday on 19 June 2023, with manager Darren Moore and the rest of his backroom staff.

On 21 September 2023, he re-united with Moore once again as part of the new coaching staff at Championship side Huddersfield Town.

== Personal life ==
Basso is a devout Christian.
