= Michael McIndoe =

Scottish footballer (born 1979)

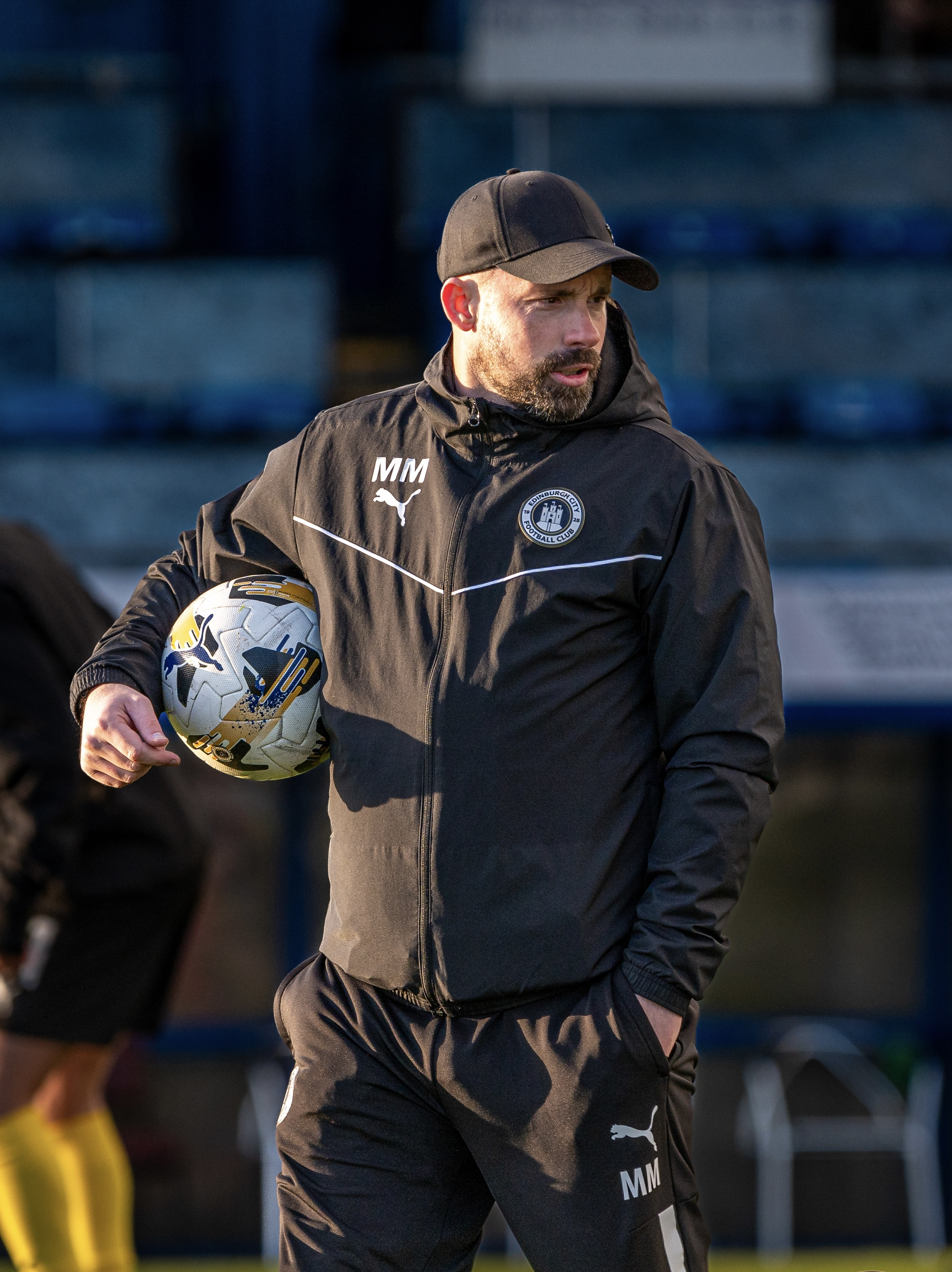
- McIndoe pre-match for Edinburgh City 2024/25

Personal information
- Full name: Michael McIndoe
- Date of birth: 2 December 1979 (age 46)
- Place of birth: Edinburgh, Scotland
- Position: Left winger

Team information
- Current team: Edinburgh City (manager)

Youth career
- 1996–1998: Luton Town

Senior career*
Years	Team	Apps	(Gls)
1998–2000	Luton Town	39	(0)
2000–2001	Hereford United	27	(2)
2001–2003	Yeovil Town	92	(22)
2003–2006	Doncaster Rovers	122	(28)
2006	→ Derby County (loan)	8	(0)
2006–2007	Barnsley	18	(4)
2006	→ Wolverhampton Wanderers (loan)	7	(0)
2007	Wolverhampton Wanderers	20	(3)
2007–2009	Bristol City	90	(12)
2009–2011	Coventry City	46	(1)
2010	→ Milton Keynes Dons (loan)	8	(0)
2013–2014	London Elite	8	(8)
2018	Clydebank	8	(0)
2018	Stirling Albion	3	(0)
Total		496	(80)

International career
2004	Scotland B	2	(0)

Managerial career
- 2022–2023: Gretna 2008
- 2023–: Edinburgh City
- * Club domestic league appearances and goals

Michael McIndoe (born 2 December 1979) is a Scottish football coach and former player, who is the manager of Edinburgh City.

McIndoe began his career at Luton Town, where he made his home league professional debut at 18 years old against Burnley on 5 September 1998. He moved onto Hereford United in 2000 before signing for Yeovil Town in 2001. At Yeovil, McIndoe won the FA Trophy and later the Football Conference title and won the division's Player of the Year award for his contributions in the title-winning season. His impressive form earned him a move to Doncaster Rovers in 2003. In his first season with Doncaster, they won the Third Division title and he was named as the PFA Player of the Year. In the 2005–06 season, he scored against Premier League clubs Aston Villa, Manchester City and Arsenal in their run to the League Cup quarter-finals. He was again named in the PFA Team of the Year.

He moved on loan to Derby County in 2006 and later had spells with Barnsley, Wolverhampton Wanders. McIndoe re-joined former Yeovil manager Gary Johnson at Bristol City where they narrowly missed out to promotion to the Premier League via the play-offs. He spent two seasons in total with Bristol City but moved to Coventry City. He spent two seasons with Coventry, including a loan spell with Milton Keynes Dons. McIndoe retired in 2011 to focus on his business career. He briefly returned to playing with spells at Clydebank and Stirling Albion. McIndoe also played twice for the Scotland B team, making his first appearance on 10 December 2003.

He started his coaching career at Gretna 2008, being appointed as manager in 2022 after a caretaker spell. He helped Gretna to avoid relegation but departed in 2023. He was appointed as manager of Scottish League One side Edinburgh City in 2023. Amidst financial difficulties and a player exodus, Edinburgh were relegated to Scottish League Two. In his first full season in charge, McIndoe led the club to the play-offs but were defeated by East Fife. However, he led the club to promotion through the League Two play-offs the following season.

== Club career ==
=== Luton Town ===
McIndoe joined Luton Town as a youth in 1996 and was an integral part of an FA Youth Cup run, losing to eventual winners Leeds United in the semi-finals. Managed by coach John Moore, the team also won the youth league as well as the South East Counties League Cup final beating West Ham United on 8 May 1998.

He made his professional home debut aged 18 against Burnley in 1998, winning 1–0. Over the course of the next two seasons McIndoe made 47 appearances. His talent was never in question but his off-field problems with alcohol addiction meant in December 1999, he was entered into the Priory. After discussions with manager Lennie Lawrence it was decided a new club would be the best for his career. Arsenal legend Paul Merson became McIndoe's sponsor helping him on his road to recovery. Former teammate Matthew Upson also played a role in advising McIndoe. He has been teetotal ever since.

=== Hereford United ===
In July 2000 Hereford United manager Graham Turner signed McIndoe on a two-year contract. He made 30 appearances for the Bulls scoring 2 goals. His performances quickly put him on the radar of other Conference teams where a bidding war began between Boston United and Yeovil Town for McIndoe's signature. Hereford United eventually sold him to Yeovil Town for £25,000 retaining a 25% sell-on clause.

=== Yeovil Town ===
Yeovil Town manager Colin Addison signed McIndoe on a three-year contract. He made a scoring debut for the Glovers on 17 February 2001, in a 2–1 win against Boston United. At the end of the 2000–01 season, the team just missed out on automatic promotion as they finished second.

Yeovil appointed Gary Johnson as the new manager for the 2001–02 season. They went on to have a successful campaign, winning the FA Trophy at Villa Park against Stevenage and finishing third in the Conference. At the age of 22, McIndoe captained the team on numerous occasions and picked up the club Player's Player of the Year award.

In the following 2002–03 season McIndoe made more appearances than any other player and was a key component in making club history, when Yeovil were crowned champions of the Nationwide Conference for the first time in 107 years. Yeovil remained unbeaten at home in the league all season. McIndoe was named in the Nationwide Conference Team of the Year and won the club's "Internet Player of the Season". He also became the first player to have all 24 managers vote unanimously for the same player as Conference Player of the Year. In two and a half years with Yeovil, McIndoe made 110 appearances and scored 25 goals.

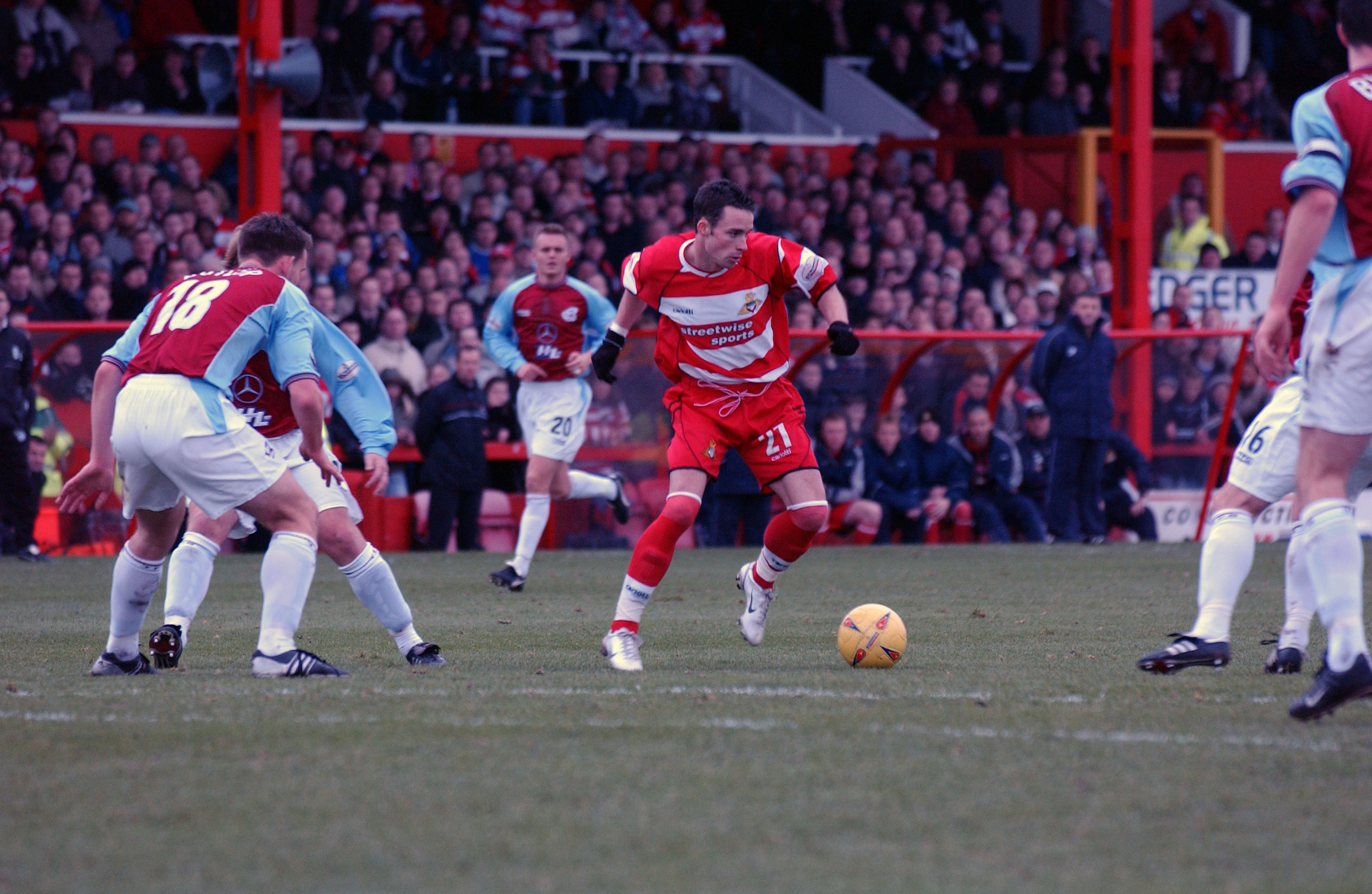
Michael McIndoe playing for Doncaster Rovers against Scunthorpe United December 2003

=== Doncaster Rovers ===
Doncaster Rovers signed McIndoe for £50,000 during the summer of 2003. He made his Rovers debut on 9 August 2003, in a 3–1 win against Leyton Orient. McIndoe scored his first hat-trick in a Football League match, scoring three times against Bristol Rovers in a 5–1 win on 4 October 2003. He also won the October Division Three Player of the Month award. His performances earned him selection for the Scotland B team in December 2003. McIndoe's first season at Doncaster was very successful with the Rovers winning the Third Division title. He was named Doncaster Rovers Player of the Year and was the only player in the championship winning side to be named in the PFA Team of the Year. To top off his season McIndoe was voted the PFA Player of the Year for the division.

In his second season with Rovers, in League One, McIndoe was the club's top scorer with 12 goals. He was voted in the top five footballers of the year in The Times Football Yearbook 2004–05 alongside Thierry Henry, Wayne Rooney and Steven Gerrard.

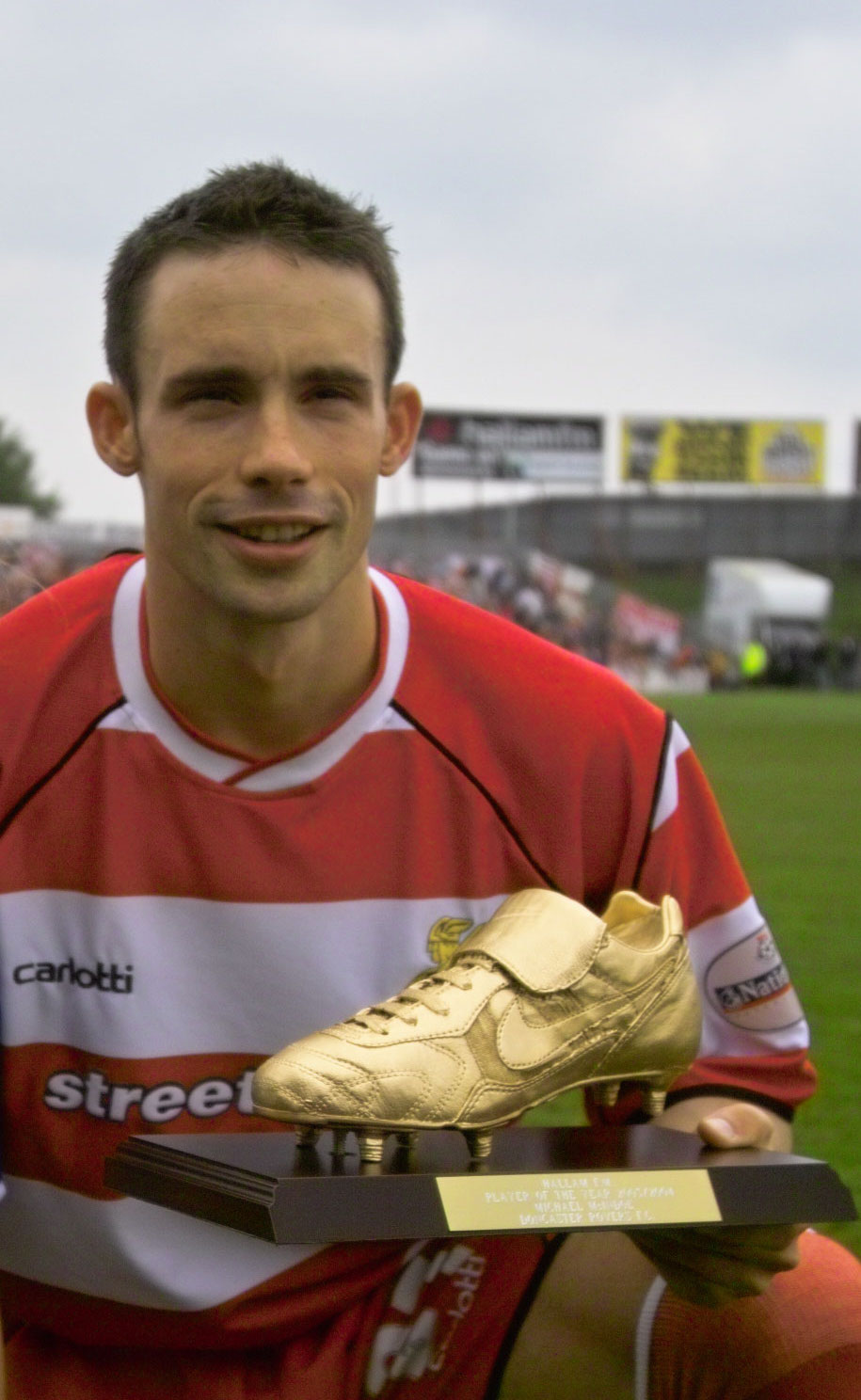
Receiving the Golden Boot for Doncaster Rovers in May 2005

Doncaster Rovers' League Cup run was the highlight of the 2005–06 season, beating Premier League sides Aston Villa and Manchester City with McIndoe scoring in both games. Rovers went on to face Arsenal on 21 December 2005 in the quarter-finals at Belle Vue. McIndoe opened the scoring in the fourth minute, beating goalkeeper Manuel Almunia from a tight angle. The game finished 2–2 after extra time, but Rovers missed three penalties as Arsenal moved on to the semi-finals. McIndoe went on to win December's League One Player of the Month award. In March 2006, Championship side Derby County moved in to sign McIndoe on a loan deal until the end of the season. For the second season running he finished as Rovers' top scorer with 13 goals (10 from penalty kicks), and was voted into the PFA Team of the Year for League One. McIndoe made 142 appearances for Doncaster Rovers, scoring 35 goals.

==== Derby County (loan) ====
Derby County manager Terry Westley brought McIndoe in on loan in March 2006, as he tried to try to help keep the club in the Championship. McIndoe made his Derby debut on 11 March 2006, in a 3–0 win against Burnley. Within days of signing for Derby, McIndoe received his second call-up for the Scotland B team. McIndoe went on to play in all of Derby's remaining fixtures in the 2005–06 season, helping them to finish 20th and avoid relegation.

=== Barnsley ===
In the 2006–07 pre-season, McIndoe signed for newly promoted Championship club Barnsley for £125,000. On 8 August 2006 he scored in his second match in a 3–2 win against Hull City. On 4 November 2006 McIndoe also scored in the Yorkshire derby against Leeds United, from outside the box with a low-driven shot. He scored 5 goals in 20 matches before Wolverhampton Wanderers made a £250,000 offer to Barnsley which was accepted in December 2006.

=== Wolverhampton Wanderers ===
McIndoe signed a three-year contract under manager Mick McCarthy. He scored his first goal for Wolves against Sheffield Wednesday away in a 2–2 draw. On a 22 April 2007 Wolves played Birmingham City in the West Midlands derby, McIndoe scored two headers but then missed a penalty in the last minute for a hat-trick, losing 3–2. Wolves finished 5th which saw them face rivals West Bromwich Albion in the play-off semi-finals. Albion beat Wolves 4–2 on aggregate over the two matches. Since joining Wolves he played in every match making 32 appearances, scoring 3 goals and numerous assists.

=== Bristol City ===
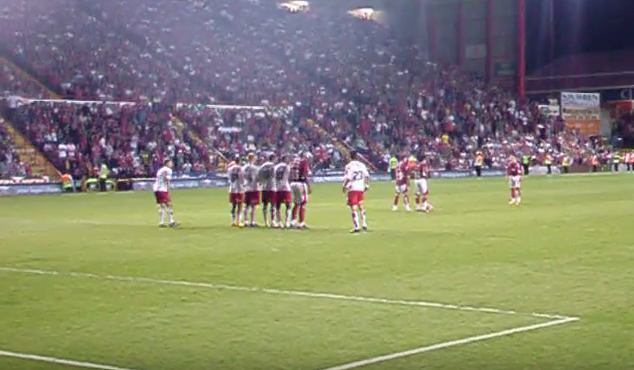
Michael McIndoe scores from a free-kick during 2nd leg of the play-off semi-final against Crystal Palace. May 2008

In July 2007, McIndoe signed a three-year contract with Championship club Bristol City reuniting with manager Gary Johnson for an undisclosed fee believed to be in the region of £500,000. On 15 September 2007 he scored his first goal for the Robins in an away match against Coventry City winning 3–0. McIndoe helped Bristol City have a successful season finishing 4th. In the play-off semi-final against Crystal Palace, he scored a 30-yard free kick in extra-time taking Bristol City to their first Championship play-off final at Wembley Stadium against Hull City in front of almost 90,000. Dean Windass scored the winning goal for Hull City taking them into the Premier League. In his first season with the Robins, McIndoe made 49 appearances scoring 7 goals from midfield. Gary Johnson rewarded McIndoe with a new 3-year contract.

In the 2008–09 season McIndoe made 48 appearances scoring 6 goals finishing 10th in the Championship.

=== Coventry City ===
On 4 August 2009, Championship club Coventry City signed McIndoe on a 2-year contract under manager Chris Coleman for an undisclosed fee believed to be around £325,000. He received his third international call up against Japan in Yokohama, but the winger pulled out of the squad due to a minor knee injury. McIndoe played in numerous positions throughout the season, scoring 1 goal and making 43 appearances for the Sky Blues.

Aidy Boothroyd was appointed as the new Coventry City manager in May 2010. In his first match Boothroyd made McIndoe captain against Austrian side VF Gaflenz winning 2–0. Surprisingly under Boothroyd, McIndoe did not feature in many matches.

In 2010–11 McIndoe signed a short-term loan deal with the League One side Milton Keynes Dons to maintain his match fitness before returning to Coventry City in the Championship.

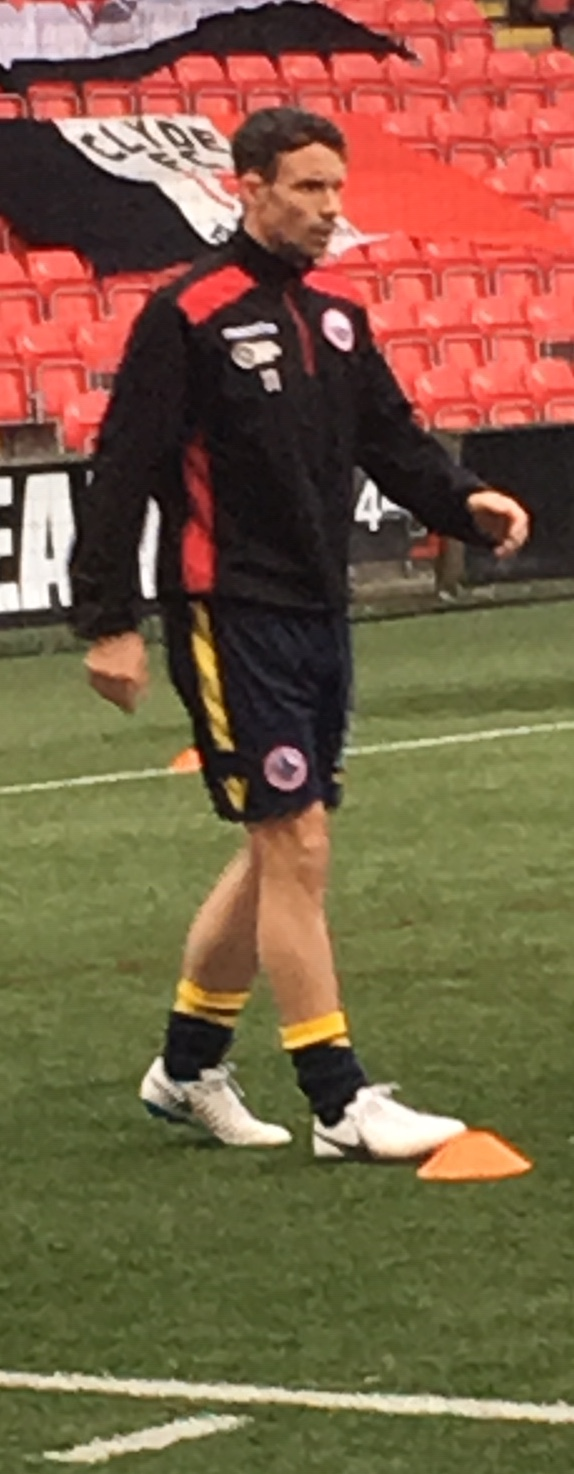
Michael McIndoe warming up for Stirling Albion against Clyde. November 2018

Newly appointed caretaker manager Andy Thorn put McIndoe straight back into the squad for the majority of the remaining matches in the 2010–11 season, where he played a part in helping Coventry City retain their Championship status. McIndoe's last professional appearance was against Middlesbrough on 25 April 2011. In July 2011 McIndoe left football to solely concentrate on his business career.

=== London Elite ===
In the 2013–14 season McIndoe along with old Luton Town and MK Dons teammate Jude Stirling helped to coach young players at London Elite while playing alongside them. McIndoe secured pre-season friendlies against Oldham Athletic, AFC Telford United and Hertford Town. The team played in the Middlesex County League Central and East Division One and McIndoe played 12 games scoring 8 goals.

=== Clydebank ===
On 2 August 2018, McIndoe signed for Scottish Junior club Clydebank. He signed a short-term deal as a favour to manager Kieran McAnespie and coach Marc McCulloch, in return gaining match fitness preparing him to go back into the professional game. McIndoe made 9 appearances for the Bankies. On 3 October 2018, McIndoe was released by Clydebank.

=== Stirling Albion ===
On 3 November 2018, McIndoe played for Stirling Albion under manager Kevin Rutkiewicz in a 3–0 win against Berwick Rangers. He played his last game for Stirling Albion against Annan Athletic in a 2–2 draw on 17 November 2018.

== Coaching career ==
=== Gretna 2008 ===
On 24 May 2022 McIndoe was appointed as sporting director and assistant manager of Gretna 2008. After being given the caretaker manager role, in his first match, he led Gretna 2008 in a 3–1 win against Edinburgh University in the first round of the Scottish Cup. He was appointed as manager on 20 September 2022.

McIndoe went on to win more games than the club's three previous seasons combined, which, in turn, steered Gretna 2008 away from relegation. He and his coaching staff left Gretna 2008 on 24 April 2023 to manage in the higher divisions of Scottish football.

=== Edinburgh City ===
McIndoe was appointed manager of Scottish League One club Edinburgh City on 9 October 2023. In his first five games in charge, McIndoe won two, lost two and drew one taking 7 points out of a possible 15; including a 3–0 win against Alloa F.C. Previously to McIndoe's appointment, the Citizens hadn't won a match in over 190 days.

Eight weeks into his tenure, Edinburgh City's directors announced the club had run out of money and that any player wishing to leave the club could do so immediately. This saw 20 senior players depart mid-season in December 2023.

Following a disciplinary tribunal, Edinburgh City received a six-point deduction by the SPFL for failing to pay their players and breaching SPFL Rules and Regulations. The chairman John Dickson publicly apologised to McIndoe and his coaching staff for putting them in this position, commending his character and commitment to the club. On 16 March 2024, Edinburgh City were relegated back to League Two.

In December 2024, McIndoe was named SPFL League Two Manager of the Month for November after leading Edinburgh City through an unbeaten month.

For the second time in the 2024–25 season, McIndoe was awarded SPFL League Two Manager of the Month for December 2024 after some impressive performances and results. McIndoe, and his coaching staff, signed a three and half year contract extension on 1 February 2025.

For a third time, McIndoe was awarded SPFL League Two Manager of the Month for February 2025, after an undefeated month, which included a 5–0 win against Edinburgh derby rivals The Spartans.

In his first full season in charge, McIndoe guided the club to a 3rd place finish in Scottish League Two, earning a spot in the play-offs. Despite operating with the smallest budget in the SPFL, his side were defeated by East Fife whole secured promotion.

At the start of the 2025–26 campaign, Edinburgh City began the season with a 15-point deduction following an SPFL insolvency ruling. Despite significant off-field uncertainty McIndoe guided the club through a difficult campaign and successfully retained their SPFL status. Under his management, Edinburgh City won their League Two play-off final fixture.His work during the season was widely praised given the club's financial difficulties and limited resources. In recognition of his efforts, McIndoe signed a new three-year contract with the club in 2026.

== Business career ==
In 2011 McIndoe became the owner of Stamp private members club on 79 Oxford Street, London. He was also director of Huxley of London, a concierge service based in Mayfair. McIndoe was also involved in London Elite F.C. which was aimed at developing young talented footballers.

In October 2014, McIndoe was declared bankrupt with debts of £3 million .

Several national newspapers have allegedly linked McIndoe to an 'investment scheme' but McIndoe has always strongly denied any allegation of wrongdoing. In December 2017, Scotland Yard completely cleared McIndoe in relation to the allegation in the national newspapers.

== Personal life ==
In September 2017 McIndoe released his first autobiography titled Wildling. It is a detailed account of his upbringing on the Calders Estate in Edinburgh, his professional football career and his nightclub on Oxford Street in London.

== Career statistics ==
=== Club ===
As of match played 17 November 2018

Appearances and goals by club, season and competition
Club	Season	League			National Cup		League Cup		Other		Total	
Club	Season	Division	Apps	Goals	Apps	Goals	Apps	Goals	Apps	Goals	Apps	Goals
Luton Town	1998–99	Second Division	22	0	2	0	2	0	1 (Note: Appearance(s) in Football League Trophy)	0	27	0
Luton Town	1999–2000	Second Division	17	0	1	0	2	0	0	0	20	0
Luton Town	Total		39	0	3	0	4	0	1	0	47	0
Hereford United	2000–01	Football Conference	27	2	0	0	—		3 (Note: One appearance in Conference League Cup, two in Football League Trophy)	0	30	2
Yeovil Town	2000–01	Football Conference	16	3	—		—		—		16	3
Yeovil Town	2001–02	Football Conference	35	7	1	0	—		8 (Note: Two appearances and one goal in Football League Trophy, six appearances and one goal in FA Trophy)	2	44	9
Yeovil Town	2002–03	Football Conference	41	12	3	1	—		6 (Note: One appearance in Football League Trophy, one in Somerset Premier Cup, four in FA Trophy)	0	50	13
Yeovil Town	Total		92	22	4	1	—		14	2	110	25
Doncaster Rovers	2003–04	Third Division	45	10	1	0	2	0	2	0	50	10
Doncaster Rovers	2004–05	League One	44	10	2	1	3	1	2	0	51	12
Doncaster Rovers	2005–06	League One	33	8	3	2	5	3	0	0	41	13
Doncaster Rovers	Total		122	28	6	3	10	4	4	0	142	35
Derby County (loan)	2005–06	Championship	8	0	—		—		—		8	0
Barnsley	2006–07	Championship	18	4	—		2	1	—		20	5
Wolverhampton Wanderers	2006–07	Championship	27	3	3	0	—		2 (Note: Appearances in Championship play-offs)	0	32	3
Bristol City	2007–08	Championship	45	6	0	0	1	0	3	1	49	7
Bristol City	2008–09	Championship	45	6	1	0	2	0	—		48	6
Bristol City	Total		90	12	1	0	3	0	3	1	97	13
Coventry City	2009–10	Championship	40	1	2	0	1	0	—		43	1
Coventry City	2010–11	Championship	6	0	0	0	1	0	—		7	0
Coventry City	Total		46	1	2	0	2	0	—		50	1
Milton Keynes Dons (loan)	2010–11	League One	8	0	—		—		—		8	0
London Elite	2013–14	MCFL Division One Central and East	8	8	0	0	—		4 (Note: Two appearances in MCFL Senior Open Cup, two in Jim Rogers President's Division One Cup)	0	12	8
Clydebank	2018–19	SJFA West Region Premiership	8	0	1	0	—		0	0	9	0
Stirling Albion	2018–19	Scottish League Two	3	0	—		—		—		3	0
Career total			496	80	20	4	21	5	31	3	568	92

=== International ===
McIndoe was selected twice by the Scotland B team.

No	Date	Venue	Opponent	Result	Competition	Ref
1	10 December 2003	Tannadice Park, Dundee	Turkey	1–1	International Friendly	
2	15 March 2006	Caledonian Stadium, Inverness	Turkey	2–3	International Friendly	

=== Managerial statistics ===
As of match played 14 November 2026

Team	From	To	Record				
Team	From	To	G	W	D	L	Win %
Edinburgh City	9 October 2023	present	152	48	28	76	31.58
Total			152	48	28	76	31.58

== Honours ==
=== Player ===
Yeovil Town

- Football Conference: 2002–03
- FA Trophy: 2001–02

Doncaster Rovers

- Football League Third Division: 2003–04

Individual

- Yeovil Town Players' Player of the Year: 2001–02
- Yeovil Town Player of the Year: 2002–03
- Football Conference Team of the Year: 2002–03
- Football Conference Player of the Year: 2002–03
- Doncaster Rovers Player of the Year: 2003–04
- PFA Team of the Year: 2003–04 Third Division, 2005–06 League One
- PFA Player of the Year: 2003–04 Third Division
- Five Footballers of the Year, The Times Football Yearbook: 2004–05
- Football League One Player of the Month: Dec 2005

=== Manager ===
Edinburgh City

- Scottish League Two play-offs: 2026

Individual

- SPFL League Two Manager of the Month: November 2024, December 2024, February 2025
