= Marlon Jackson (footballer) =

English footballer (born 1990)

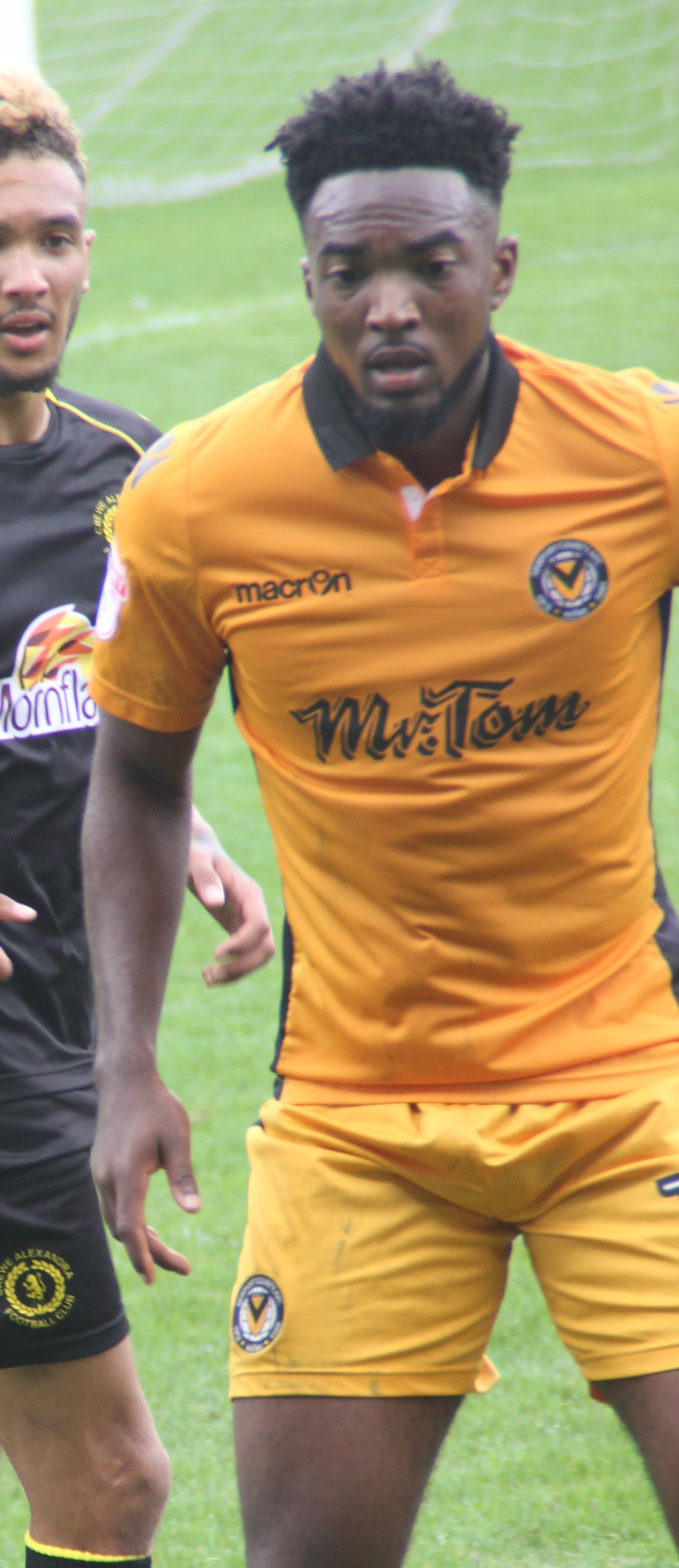
- Jackson playing for Newport County in 2016

Personal information
- Full name: Marlon Michael Jackson
- Date of birth: 6 December 1990 (age 35)
- Place of birth: Bristol, England
- Height: 6 ft 2 in (1.88 m)
- Positions: Striker; winger

Team information
- Current team: Yate Town

Youth career
- 1996–2009: Bristol City

Senior career*
| Years | Team | Apps | (Gls) |
| 2009–2012 | Bristol City | 5 | (0) |
| 2009 | → Hereford United (loan) | 5 | (0) |
| 2009–2010 | → Aldershot Town (loan) | 24 | (1) |
| 2010 | → Aldershot Town (loan) | 9 | (0) |
| 2011 | → Northampton Town (loan) | 6 | (1) |
| 2011 | → Cheltenham Town (loan) | 1 | (0) |
| 2012 | → AFC Telford United (loan) | 8 | (1) |
| 2012–2013 | Hereford United | 25 | (13) |
| 2013–2014 | Bury | 8 | (1) |
| 2013 | → Lincoln City (loan) | 4 | (1) |
| 2014 | FC Halifax Town | 14 | (0) |
| 2014–2015 | Oxford City | 24 | (5) |
| 2015 | Tranmere Rovers | 11 | (0) |
| 2015–2016 | Oxford City | 8 | (11) |
| 2016–2018 | Newport County | 28 | (1) |
| 2018 | Hereford | 3 | (1) |
| 2018–2019 | Weston-super-Mare | 24 | (13) |
| 2019–2020 | Gloucester City | 24 | (9) |
| 2020–2021 | Chippenham Town | 15 | (3) |
| 2021–2024 | Weston-super-Mare | 85 | (39) |
| 2024– | Yate Town | 65 | (23) |

International career
| 2013 | England C | 1 | (1) |
- * Club domestic league appearances and goals as of 19:13, 19 June 2024 (UTC)

Marlon Michael Jackson (born 6 December 1990) is an English professional footballer for Southern League Premier Division South club Yate Town.

== Career ==
Born in Bristol, Jackson joined League Two club Hereford United on an initial one-month loan on 21 August 2009, alongside his clubmate and fellow young striker Tristan Plummer. Jackson joined League Two club Aldershot Town on an initial one-month loan on 25 November 2009.

Jackson joined AFC Telford United on loan in January 2012, and scored on his debut against Kettering Town at the New Bucks Head Stadium. He rejoined the club on loan for a second period in March 2012. At the end of the 2011–12 season, he was released from Bristol City.

=== Hereford United ===
After his release from Bristol City, Jackson joined newly relegated club Hereford United on a one-year deal. He scored on his début and Hereford's first game of the season in a 2–1 win over Macclesfield Town. Following this, in his second game for the Bulls, Jackson was sent off in the first half for violent conduct, in a match which saw Hereford draw 2–2 with Tamworth F.C.

=== Bury ===
On 31 July 2013 Jackson completed a move back to the Football League by signing for League Two club Bury on a one-year deal. Jackson scored his first goal for the club, coming on as a substitute, to score the third goal in a 3–0 victory against Accrington Stanley.

On 16 January 2014, Jackson's contract was cancelled.

=== Lincoln City ===
On 25 October 2013 Jackson signed for Conference Premier club Lincoln City on a two-month loan from Bury.

=== FC Halifax Town ===
On 16 January 2014 Jackson signed for the Conference Premier club FC Halifax Town from Bury. He was released by Halifax in June 2014 and joined Oxford City.

=== Tranmere Rovers ===
On 29 August 2015 Jackson signed for National League newcomers Tranmere Rovers on a non contract basis. He was released by Tranmere in December 2014 and rejoined Oxford City.

=== Newport County ===
On 27 July 2016 Jackson signed for League Two club Newport County on a one-year contract after a successful trial period. He made his debut for Newport on 6 August 2016 versus Mansfield Town. He scored his first goal for Newport in a 3–2 EFL Cup loss against Milton Keynes Dons on 9 August 2016. On 18 May 2017 Jackson signed a one-year contract to remain with Newport County. He was released by Newport at the end of the 2017–18 season.

=== Hereford F.C. ===
On 27 September 2018 it was announced his much rumoured signing at Hereford was completed and International clearance received. He made his debut the same day in an FA Cup draw against Truro City F.C. and scored his first goal for the club 3 days later in the replay.

=== Chippenham Town ===
In July 2020, he signed for Chippenham Town

=== Return to Weston ===
In November 2021, he returned to Southern Football League Premier Division South side Weston-super-Mare for a second spell following his departure from Chippenham Town, having been the club's top scorer during 2018–19 with nine goals.

=== Yate Town ===
On 19 June 2024, Jackson joined Southern Premier Division South club Yate Town.
