= Bradley Orr =

English footballer

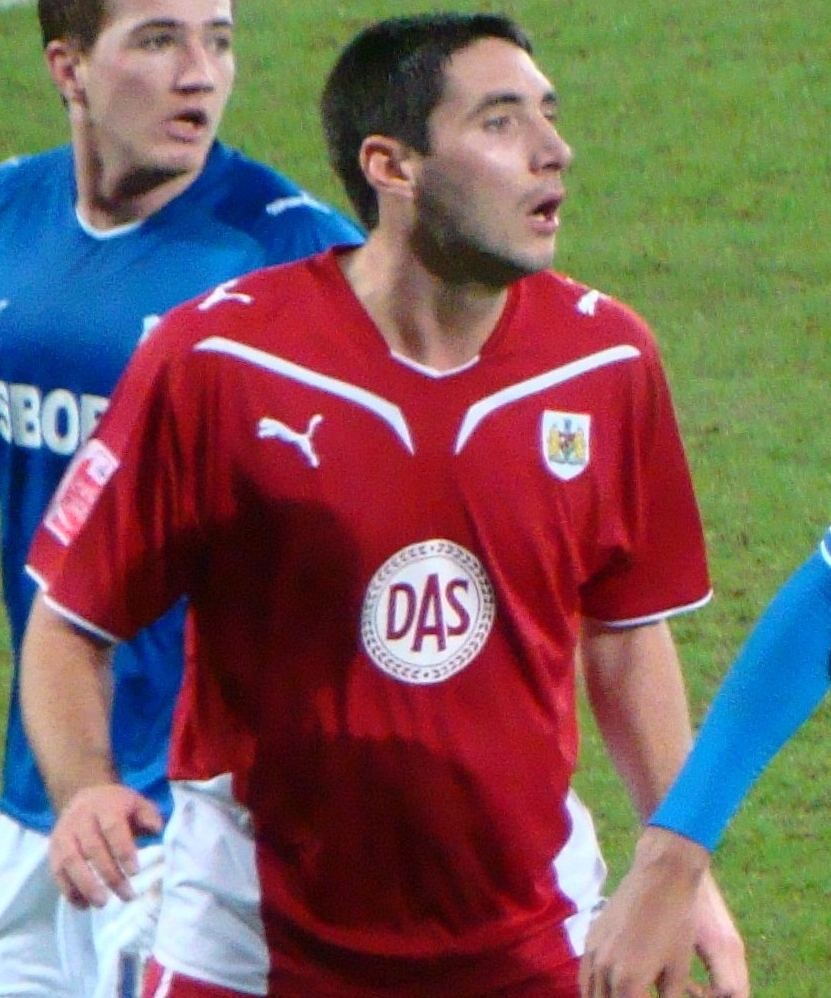
- Orr playing for Bristol City in 2010

Personal information
- Full name: Bradley James Orr
- Date of birth: 1 November 1982 (age 44)
- Place of birth: Liverpool, England
- Position: Right-back

Youth career
- –1998: Everton
- 1998–2002: Newcastle United

Senior career*
| Years | Team | Apps | (Gls) |
| 2002–2004 | Newcastle United | 0 | (0) |
| 2004 | → Burnley (loan) | 4 | (0) |
| 2004–2010 | Bristol City | 229 | (12) |
| 2010–2012 | Queens Park Rangers | 39 | (1) |
| 2012–2015 | Blackburn Rovers | 31 | (0) |
| 2012–2013 | → Ipswich Town (loan) | 13 | (0) |
| 2013–2014 | → Blackpool (loan) | 4 | (0) |
| 2014 | → Toronto FC (loan) | 19 | (1) |
| Total | | 339 | (14) |
- * Club domestic league appearances and goals

Bradley James Orr (born 1 November 1982) is an English former professional footballer who played as a right-back.

== Career ==
=== Newcastle United & loans ===
Born in Liverpool, Merseyside, Orr started his senior career with Newcastle United when Kenny Dalglish was manager, having started out at Everton and progressed through the club's ranks.

On 8 January 2003, Orr signed a contract with Newcastle United, keeping him until the end of the 2003–04 season. Throughout the 2003–04 season, Orr appeared as an unused substitute bench as Newcastle United's cover without making an appearance for the Magpies.

Due to a lack of opportunities in the first team, Orr was loaned out to Burnley for an initial month's loan. He made his professional league debut, coming on as a late substitute, in a 0–0 draw against Wigan Athletic on 30 January 2004. In his fourth appearance for the club, Orr made his first start professionally, starting the whole game, in a 2–0 defeat against Millwall on 28 February 2004, in what turned out to be his last appearance for Burnley. Shortly after, he was recalled by his parent club.

=== Bristol City ===
Shortly after this loan period in July 2004, Orr signed for Bristol City. He scored his first goal for his new team against Yeovil Town.

Although he was signed as a central midfielder, he was converted to right-back in 2005–06 and played most of his games in that position.

On 29 August 2006, Orr was sent off for attempting to head-butt his own teammate, Louis Carey, during a game against Northampton Town. On 1 September 2006, Orr was sentenced to 28 days in jail relating to an incident outside a Bristol nightclub the previous October. Also jailed in relation to the same incident were teammates Steve Brooker for 28 days, and David Partridge for two months. Orr and Brooker were released on 14 September 2006, serving only half of their original sentence. He scored against Manchester City in the League Cup second round.

He was named in the PFA's Championship team of the season 2007–08.

According to media sources, he broke his cheekbone in the play-off final against Hull City.

On 27 November 2008, Bristol City decided to place Orr on the transfer list, due to rejecting several contract offers. On 1 January 2009, Bristol City announced that Orr had signed a two-and-a-half-year contract at the club.

=== Queens Park Rangers ===
On 26 July 2010, Orr signed for Queens Park Rangers. He scored his first goal for the club in a 2–0 win over Scunthorpe United on 21 August 2010. He became a regular in Rangers Championship winning season with a number of impressive performances at right back helping Rangers to a high number of clean sheets. Once promoted to the Premier League his first team opportunities at Loftus Road became increasingly limited following the signing of right back Luke Young.

=== Blackburn Rovers ===
His time at QPR was short-lived however, due to a lack of first team games. He made a move in the January 2012 transfer window to Blackburn Rovers on a three-and-a-half-year deal for an undisclosed fee a move he said he badly needed.

Orr made his debut for Blackburn when he replaced Jason Lowe in the 36th minute of the game in the 7–1 loss against Arsenal at the Emirates Stadium on 4 February 2012. He made his full home debut against his former employers QPR at Ewood Park, exactly a week later on 11 February 2012, in a game Rovers went on to win 3–2 and he also completed the full 90 minutes in his right-back slot. On 2 April 2012, Orr started and played the full 90 minutes in the right-back berth against Manchester United at Ewood Park which ended in a 2–0 defeat on the night of his sixth appearance for Rovers in the Barclays Premier League. On 21 April 2012, he started and played the full 90 minutes in the right-back spot with Jason Lowe playing further forward in a 2–0 victory over Norwich City at Ewood Park, thanks to strikes from Mauro Formica and Junior Hoilett. On 7 May 2012, Orr started the 1–0 defeat against Lancashire rivals Wigan Athletic at Ewood Park, but was replaced on 80 minutes for David Goodwillie, this loss meant that Rovers were relegated from the top flight.

=== Ipswich Town (loan) ===
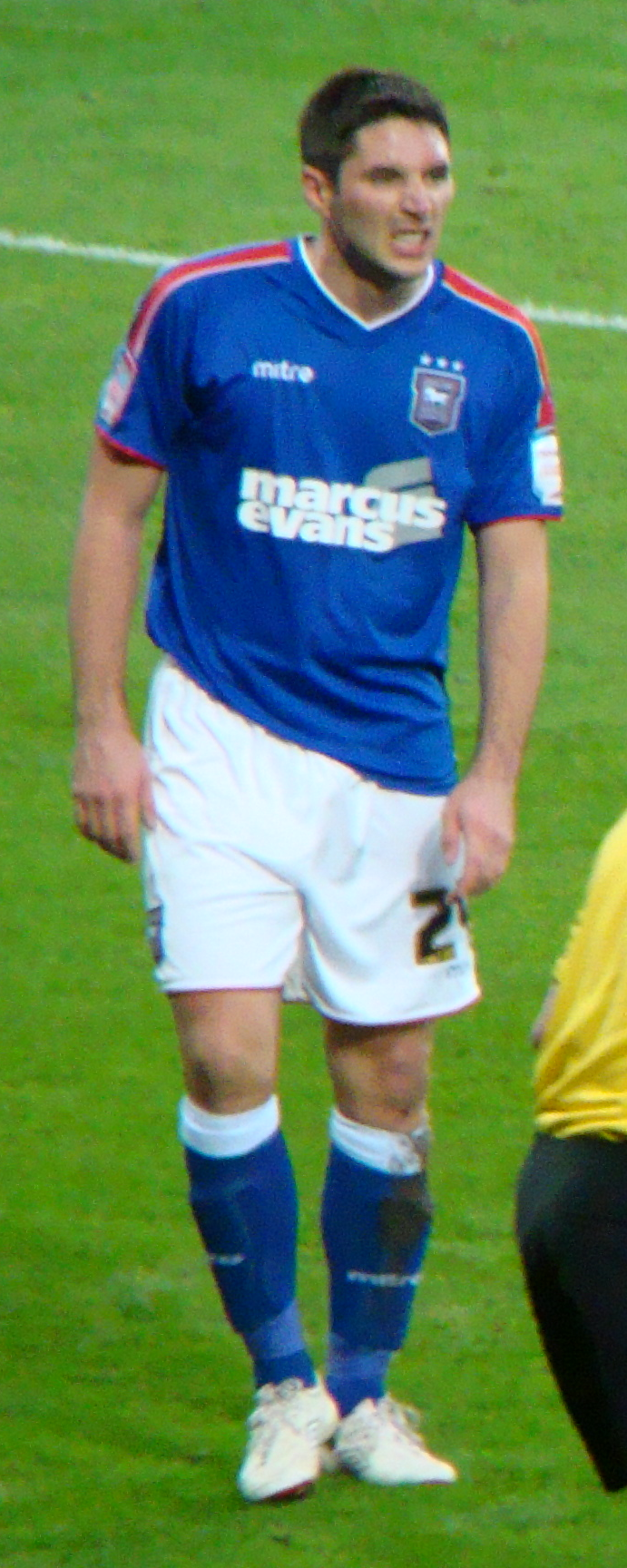
Orr playing for Ipswich Town in 2013

On 14 November 2012, Orr signed for Ipswich Town on loan until 26 January 2013. His loan was extended to the end of the season in January 2013.

=== Blackpool (loan) ===
On 2 September 2013, Orr signed for Blackpool on loan until 2 January 2014.

=== Toronto FC (loan) ===
On 25 January 2014, it was announced that Orr would be placed out on loan to MLS side Toronto FC. The loan is set to run to December 2014 and would see Orr reunited with his former teammate at Blackburn, Ryan Nelsen. Nelsen was the head coach of Toronto FC having been sacked, along with his assistants, on 31 August 2014. Orr made his debut with Toronto in their season opener at Seattle Sounders FC on 15 March, the game ended in a 2–1 away victory with both goals coming from newly acquired Jermain Defoe. He scored his first goal for Toronto on 23 May against Sporting Kansas City.

== Personal life ==
Orr is the uncle of former footballer Jon Flanagan.

== Career statistics ==
Appearances and goals by club, season and competition
| Club | Season | League | | | National cup | | League cup | | Continental | | Other | | Total | |
| Club | Season | Division | Apps | Goals | Apps | Goals | Apps | Goals | Apps | Goals | Apps | Goals | Apps | Goals |
|---|---|---|---|---|---|---|---|---|---|---|---|---|---|---|
| Newcastle United | 2003–04 | Premier League | 0 | 0 | 0 | 0 | 0 | 0 | 0 | 0 | – | | 0 | 0 |
| Burnley (loan) | 2003–04 | Championship | 4 | 0 | 0 | 0 | 0 | 0 | – | | – | | 4 | 0 |
| Bristol City | 2004–05 | League One | 37 | 0 | 2 | 0 | 2 | 0 | – | | 1 | 0 | 42 | 0 |
| Bristol City | 2005–06 | League One | 38 | 1 | 1 | 0 | 0 | 0 | – | | – | | 39 | 1 |
| Bristol City | 2006–07 | League One | 35 | 4 | 4 | 0 | 0 | 0 | – | | 4 | 0 | 43 | 4 |
| Bristol City | 2007–08 | Championship | 42 | 4 | 1 | 0 | 2 | 1 | – | | 3 | 0 | 48 | 5 |
| Bristol City | 2008–09 | Championship | 38 | 1 | 2 | 0 | 1 | 0 | – | | – | | 41 | 1 |
| Bristol City | 2009–10 | Championship | 39 | 2 | 2 | 0 | 1 | 0 | – | | – | | 42 | 2 |
| Bristol City | Total | | 229 | 12 | 12 | 0 | 6 | 1 | 0 | 0 | 8 | 0 | 255 | 13 |
| Queens Park Rangers | 2010–11 | Championship | 33 | 1 | 1 | 0 | 1 | 0 | – | | – | | 35 | 1 |
| Queens Park Rangers | 2011–12 | Premier League | 6 | 0 | 1 | 0 | 1 | 0 | – | | – | | 8 | 0 |
| Queens Park Rangers | Total | | 39 | 1 | 2 | 0 | 2 | 0 | 0 | 0 | 0 | 0 | 43 | 1 |
| Blackburn Rovers | 2011–12 | Premier League | 12 | 0 | 0 | 0 | 0 | 0 | – | | – | | 12 | 0 |
| Blackburn Rovers | 2012–13 | Championship | 19 | 0 | 2 | 0 | 1 | 0 | – | | – | | 22 | 0 |
| Blackburn Rovers | 2013–14 | Championship | 0 | 0 | 0 | 0 | 0 | 0 | – | | – | | 0 | 0 |
| Blackburn Rovers | Total | | 31 | 0 | 2 | 0 | 1 | 0 | 0 | 0 | 0 | 0 | 34 | 0 |
| Ipswich Town (loan) | 2012–13 | Championship | 13 | 0 | 0 | 0 | 0 | 0 | – | | – | | 13 | 0 |
| Blackpool (loan) | 2013–14 | Championship | 4 | 0 | 0 | 0 | 0 | 0 | – | | – | | 4 | 0 |
| Toronto FC (loan) | 2014 | MLS | 19 | 1 | 2 | 0 | – | | – | | – | | 21 | 1 |
| Career total | | | 339 | 14 | 18 | 0 | 9 | 1 | 0 | 0 | 8 | 0 | 374 | 15 |

== Honours ==
Queens Park Rangers

- Football League Championship: 2010–11

Individual

- PFA Team of the Year: 2007–08 Championship
