= Ivan Sproule =

Northern Irish footballer (born 1981)

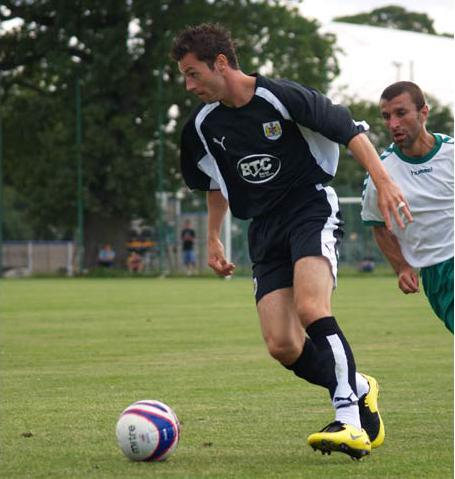
- Sproule playing for Bristol City.

Personal information
- Full name: Ivan Sproule
- Date of birth: 18 February 1981 (age 45)
- Place of birth: Castlederg, Northern Ireland
- Position: Winger

Senior career*
Years	Team	Apps	(Gls)
2000–2001	Moyola Park		
2001–2004	Omagh Town	95	(19)
2004–2005	Institute	11	(2)
2005–2007	Hibernian	71	(12)
2007–2011	Bristol City	119	(6)
2010	→ Yeovil Town (loan)	2	(0)
2011	→ Notts County (loan)	5	(0)
2011–2013	Hibernian	44	(3)
2013	Ross County	24	(8)
2014–2016	Linfield	31	(5)
2016	→ Ballinamallard United (loan)	7	(4)
2016–2024	Dergview	18	(2)
Total		427	(61)

International career
2005–2007	Northern Ireland	11	(1)

Managerial career
- 2018–2021: Dergview
- 2024–2025: Dergview
- * Club domestic league appearances and goals

Ivan Sproule (born 18 February 1981) is a Northern Irish retired professional footballer who was most recently manager of NIFL Premier Intermediate side Dergview. Early in his career, Sproule played in Northern Ireland for Omagh Town and Institute. He became a full-time professional in January 2005, after he signed for Scottish Premier League side Hibernian, just a month before his 24th birthday. He made a significant impact at Hibernian, scoring a hat-trick against Rangers and earning selection by the Northern Ireland national team.

Sproule moved to Football League Championship club Bristol City in 2007. After four years with the club, including loan spells at Yeovil Town and Notts County in his final season, Sproule agreed to return to Hibernian in May 2011, where he spent two more seasons. After a year with Ross County, Sproule returned to Northern Ireland.

== Club career ==
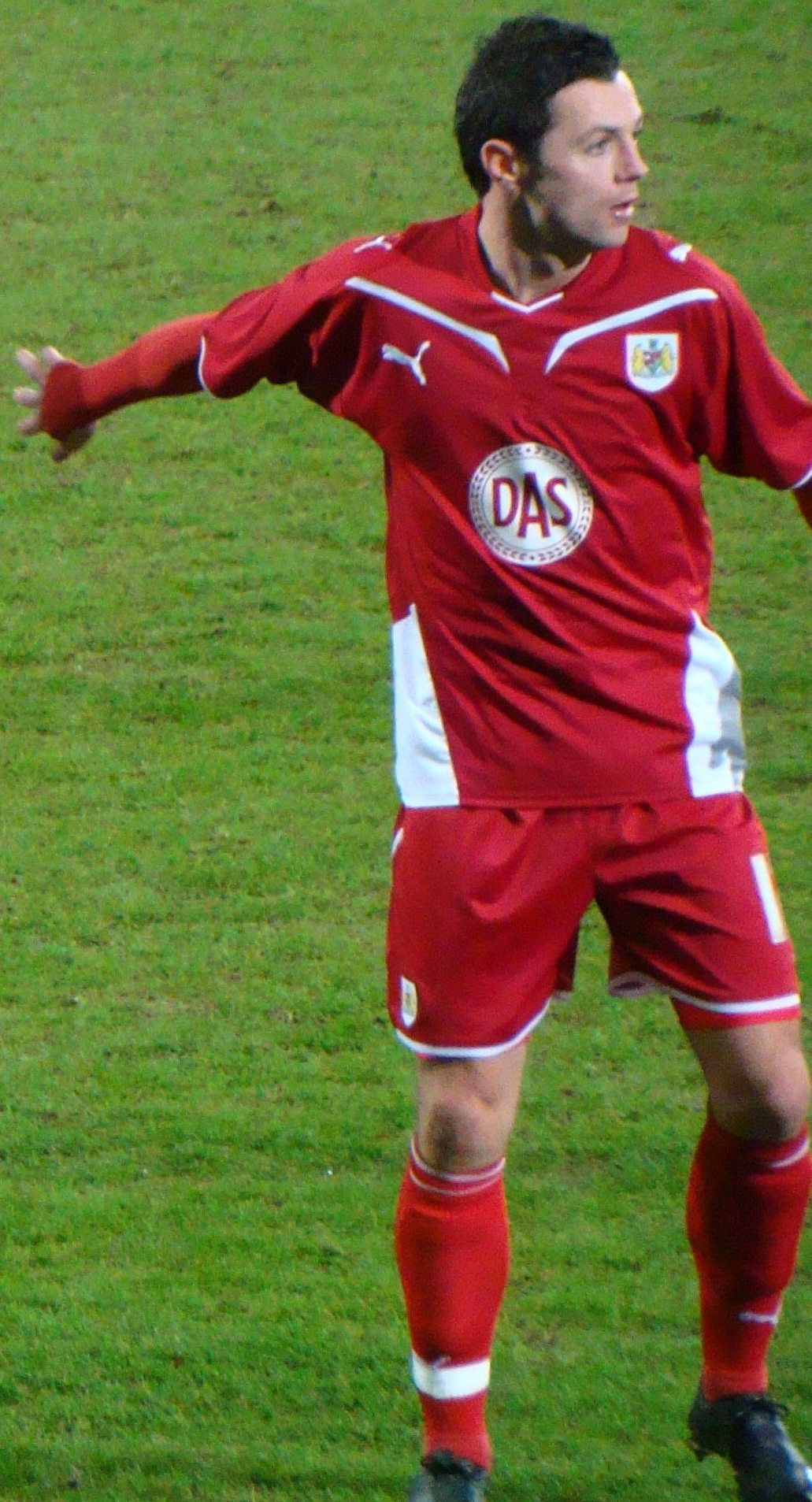
Sproule playing for Bristol City in January 2010 in a FA Cup match against Cardiff City

Sproule, a winger who was known for his explosive pace, played in the Irish Football League for semi-professional clubs Omagh Town and Institute. He combined playing football with his full-time career as an engineer. Scottish Premier League club Hibernian invited him for a trial in January 2005, after he had been transfer listed by Institute. He impressed manager Tony Mowbray and signed as a full-time professional until the end of the season, which meant that he had to give up his day job as a fabrication engineer. Hibs paid Institute a transfer fee of £5,000.

The gamble of signing a player from outside professional football paid off for both Sproule and Hibs. Although he had a slow start with Hibs and it was rumoured that he would return to Northern Ireland, he scored one of the goals in a 3–1 win over Celtic at Celtic Park. Sproule was offered an extended contract which he accepted. Sproule hit the headlines in August 2005 by scoring a hat-trick in a 3–0 defeat of champions Rangers at Ibrox Stadium. His performances caused Sproule to be linked with a £1 million move to Ukrainian club FC Dnipro Dnipropetrovsk, who had played against Hibs in the 2005–06 UEFA Cup.

Sproule caused further damage to Rangers by helping Hibs eliminate them from the 2005–06 Scottish Cup. Sproule scored one goal and assisted with another, as Hibs again won 3–0 at Ibrox. He was part of the team that won the 2007 Scottish League Cup Final. In total, Sproule made 94 appearances in his first spell with Hibs, scoring 18 goals.

Sproule joined Bristol City on a three-year contract on 27 June 2007 for an undisclosed fee, believed to be about £500,000. He made his debut for the West Country club on 29 August 2007 against Manchester City in the League Cup. He was made to sit out the first four games of the season due to a suspension which he received while playing for Hibernian. He scored his first goal for Bristol City on 24 October 2007 in their 2–1 victory over Southampton. Sproule was part of the Bristol City squad who were beaten in the Championship 2008 play-off final against Hull City.

Sproule fell out of favour at Bristol City in 2010, making his last start for the first team in August. He was loaned to Yeovil Town in November. He was then loaned to Notts County in March 2011.

In April 2011, Sproule held discussions with Colin Calderwood about a proposed return to Hibernian. Sproule signed a pre-contract agreement with the club a month later. On the opening game of the season, he played his first Hibs match in a 2–0 loss against Celtic; scored on his first match two months later, in a 3–2 win over St Johnstone. Sproule fell out of favour at Hibs during the 2012–13 season, making only one starting appearance.

Sproule moved to Ross County on a free transfer in January 2013. He scored two goals in his first appearance for the club, in a 4–1 victory at St Mirren on 19 January. After the match, Manager Derek Adams praised Sproule's performance, while Sproule, himself, say his debut was a 'dream' A week later, Sproule scored again but this time was against his former club Hibs in a 1–0 win. Sproule scored 8 goals in 24 appearances for Ross County, but decided to leave the club in November 2013 for personal reasons.

Sproule agreed in December 2013 to sign for Linfield.

== International career ==
Sproule was called into the Northern Ireland squad for the first time in September 2005, immediately after his hat-trick for Hibernian against Rangers. He came on as a substitute in the 1–0 win against England at Windsor Park to win his first cap. Sproule scored a goal on his first start for Northern Ireland, against Estonia on 1 March 2006. Sproule made a total of 11 appearances for Northern Ireland between 2005 and 2007.

== Scottish and English career statistics ==
As of 29 November 2013

Club	Season	League		Cup		League Cup		Other		Total	
Club	Season	App	Goals	App	Goals	App	Goals	App	Goals	App	Goals
Hibernian	2004–05	7	1	1	0	0	0	0	0	8	1
Hibernian	2005–06	32	4	4	3	2	0	2	0	40	7
Hibernian	2006–07	32	7	6	1	4	0	4	2	46	10
Hibernian	Total	71	12	11	4	6	0	6	2	94	18
Bristol City	2007–08	40	2	1	0	1	0	2	0	44	2
Bristol City	2008–09	38	3	2	0	1	0	0	0	41	3
Bristol City	2009–10	30	1	1	0	2	0	0	0	33	1
Bristol City	2010–11	11	0	0	0	1	1	0	0	12	1
Bristol City	Total	119	6	4	0	5	1	2	0	130	7
Yeovil Town (loan)	2010–11	2	0	0	0	0	0	0	0	2	0
Notts County (loan)	2010–11	5	0	0	0	0	0	0	0	5	0
Hibernian	2011–12	34	3	5	0	3	1	0	0	42	4
Hibernian	2012–13	10	0	1	0	0	0	0	0	11	0
Hibernian	Total	44	3	6	0	3	1	0	0	53	4
Ross County	2012–13	14	6	0	0	0	0	0	0	14	6
Ross County	2013–14	10	2	0	0	1	0	0	0	11	2
Ross County	Total	24	8	0	0	1	0	0	0	25	8
Career total		265	29	21	4	15	2	8	2	308	37

=== International caps ===
Scores and results list Northern Ireland's goal tally first.

International appearances and goals
App	Date	Venue	Opponent	Result	Goal	Competition
1.	7 September 2005	Windsor Park, Belfast	England	1–0	0	2006 World Cup qualifier
2.	15 November 2005	Windsor Park, Belfast	Portugal	1–1	0	Friendly
3.	1 March 2006	Windsor Park, Belfast	Estonia	1–0	1	Friendly
4.	21 May 2006	Giants Stadium, New Jersey	Uruguay	0–1	0	Friendly
5.	26 May 2006	Soldier Field, Chicago	Romania	0–2	0	Friendly
6.	16 August 2006	Olympiastadion, Helsinki	Finland	2–1	0	Friendly
7.	6 February 2007	Windsor Park, Belfast	Wales	0–0	0	Friendly
8.	28 March 2007	Windsor Park, Belfast	Sweden	2–1	0	Euro 2008 qualifier
9.	17 October 2007	Råsunda Stadium, Solna	Sweden	1–1	0	Euro 2008 qualifier
10.	17 November 2007	Windsor Park, Belfast	Denmark	2–1	0	Euro 2008 qualifier
11.	21 November 2007	Estadio Gran Canaria, Las Palmas	Spain	0–1	0	Euro 2008 qualifier

== Personal life ==
Sproule is married and has three sons. A second child was stillborn in November 2009, causing him to miss Bristol City's match against Nottingham Forest. City manager Gary Johnson dedicated their equalising goal in the match to Sproule, who had sent a message of support to his teammates. Johnson commented:

We respect him for thinking of us at a time when we're thinking about him. It was a major shock to all of us and we're all very close to Ivan.
