= 2003–04 Yeovil Town F.C. season =

Yeovil Town
2003–04 season
- Chairman: John Fry
- Manager: Gary Johnson
- Stadium: Huish Park
- Third Division: 8th
- FA Cup: Third round
- League Cup: First round
- FL Trophy: Second round
- Top goalscorer: League: Gavin Williams (9); All: Gavin Williams (13)
- Highest home attendance: 9,348 (4 January vs. Liverpool, FA Cup)
- Lowest home attendance: 3,052 (4 November vs. Colchester United, FL Trophy)
- Average home league attendance: 6,197
Home colours	Away colours

The 2003–04 season was the 108th season of Yeovil Town Football Club, an English football club based in Yeovil, Somerset, and their first season in the Football League.

The team reached the third round of the FA Cup before losing 2–0 at home to Premier League side Liverpool. The team played their first ever Football League Cup campaign being knocked out in the first round losing 4–1 away at Luton Town, while in the Football League Trophy the club were knocked out on penalties by Colchester United in the second round. Welsh attacking midfielder Gavin Williams was the club's top goalscorer scoring 13 goals, with 9 in the league, three in the FA Cup and one in the Football League Trophy.

== Club ==
=== Coaching staff ===
Position	Staff
Manager	(England) Gary Johnson
Assistant manager	(England) Steve Thompson
Goalkeeping coach	(England) Jon Sheffield
Reserve team manager	(Scotland) Maurice O'Donnell
Youth team manager	(England) Stuart Housley
Physiotherapist	(England) Tony Farmer

=== Kit ===
Supplier: Paulas Benara
Sponsor(s): Bradfords Building Supplies

Home	Home Alt	Away

== Transfers ==
=== In ===
Date	Name	From	Fee	Ref
22 July 2003	Jamie Gosling	Bath City	Free	
25 July 2003	Hugo Rodrigues	Pedras Rubras	Free (released)	
6 August 2003	Jake Edwards	Charleston Battery	Free (released)	
21 August 2003	Paul Terry	Dagenham & Redbridge	Undisclosed (~ £20,000)	
17 November 2003	Jon Sheffield	Yeovil Town	Free (released)	
3 December 2003	Lee Elam	Halifax Town	Undisclosed	
23 January 2004	Simon Weatherstone	Boston United	£15,000	
24 March 2004	Dani Rodrigues	Ionikos	Free (released)	
25 March 2004	Nathan Talbott	Wolverhampton Wanderers	Free (released)	

=== Out ===
Date	Name	To	Fee	Ref
4 August 2003	Michael McIndoe	Doncaster Rovers	£50,000	
19 March 2004	Chris Giles	Aldershot Town	Free	
19 May 2004	Lee Elam	Hornchurch	Free	
14 June 2004	Adam Stansfield	Hereford United	Free	
30 June 2004	Nick Crittenden	Aldershot Town	Released	
30 June 2004	Jake Edwards	Exeter City	Released	
30 June 2004	Abdou El-Kholti	Cambridge United	Released	
30 June 2004	Jamie Gosling	Team Bath	Released	
30 June 2004	Kirk Jackson	Hornchurch	Released	
30 June 2004	Nathan Talbott	Stafford Rangers	Released	
30 June 2004	Dani Rodrigues	AFC Bournemouth	Rejected new contract	
30 June 2004	Hugo Rodrigues	Retired	Rejected new contract	

=== Loan in ===
Date	Name	From	End date	Ref
15 August 2003	Jermaine Johnson	Bolton Wanderers	23 August 2003	
3 September 2003	Ronnie Bull	Millwall	3 November 2003	
30 October 2003	Lee Elam	Halifax Town	3 December 2003	
4 February 2004	Andy Bishop	Walsall	3 March 2004	
18 March 2004	Lee Matthews	Bristol City	8 May 2004	
19 March 2004	Ryan Northmore	Woking	8 May 2004	

=== Loan out ===
Date	Name	To	End date	Ref
14 November 2003	Andy Lindegaard	Weymouth	14 December 2003	
21 January 2004	Kirk Jackson	Dagenham & Redbridge	29 February 2004	
13 February 2004	Chris Giles	Woking	12 March 2004	
24 March 2004	Lee Elam	Chester City	24 April 2004	

== Match results ==
League positions are sourced from Statto, while the remaining contents of each table are sourced from the references in the "Ref" column.

=== Third Division ===
Third Division match details
Date	League position	Opponents	Venue	Result	Score F–A	Scorers	Attendance	Ref
9 August 2003	3rd	Rochdale	A	W	3–1	Gall (2), Johnson	4,611	
16 August 2003	1st	Carlisle United	H	W	3–0	Gall (2), Jackson	6,347	
23 August 2003	7th	Leyton Orient	A	L	0–2		4,431	
25 August 2003	8th	Northampton Town	H	L	0–2		6,105	
30 August 2003	18th	Macclesfield Town	A	L	1–4	Lockwood	2,221	
6 September 2003	12th	Swansea City	H	W	2–0	Stansfield, Jackson	6,655	
13 September 2003	5th	York City	H	W	3–0	Jackson, Pluck, Stansfield	5,653	
16 September 2003	4th	Doncaster Rovers	A	W	1–0	Williams	4,716	
20 September 2003	3rd	Mansfield Town	A	W	1–0	Jackson	5,270	
27 September 2003	4th	Torquay United	H	L	0–2		7,718	
30 September 2003	3rd	Boston United	H	W	2–0	Williams, Lockwood	5,093	
4 October 2003	6th	Cheltenham Town	A	L	1–3	Gall	4,960	
11 October 2003	8th	Oxford United	A	L	0–1		6,301	
18 October 2003	6th	Darlington	H	W	1–0	Williams	4,892	
21 October 2003	5th	Huddersfield Town	H	W	2–1	Skiverton, Johnson	5,274	
25 October 2003	5th	Cambridge United	A	W	4–1	Edwards (2), Gall, Way	4,072	
1 November 2003	6th	Bury	A	L	1–2	Edwards	3,086	
15 November 2003	5th	Southend United	H	W	4–0	Elam, Way, Johnson (2)	5,248	
22 November 2003	5th	Hull City	A	D	0–0		14,367	
29 November 2003	5th	Lincoln City	H	W	3–1	Pluck, Stansfield, Gosling	4,867	
13 December 2003	4th	Bristol Rovers	A	W	1–0	Crittenden	9,812	
20 December 2003	3rd	Scunthorpe United	H	W	2–1	Lindegaard, Jackson	5,714	
26 December 2003	5th	Kidderminster Harriers	H	L	1–2	Gall	5,640	
28 December 2003	5th	Swansea City	A	L	2–3	Williams, Gall	9,800	
10 January 2004	5th	Rochdale	H	W	1–0	Williams	5,806	
17 January 2004	5th	Carlisle United	A	L	0–2		5,455	
24 January 2004	5th	Leyton Orient	H	L	1–2	Crittenden	6,299	
31 January 2004	6th	Macclesfield Town	H	D	2–2	Edwards, Way	5,257	
3 February 2004	6th	Northampton Town	A	L	0–2		4,363	
7 February 2004	5th	Kidderminster Harriers	A	W	1–0	Williams	3,255	
14 February 2004	5th	Oxford United	H	W	1–0	Bishop	7,404	
21 February 2004	6th	Darlington	A	L	2–3	Johnson, Lockwood	4,500	
28 February 2004	6th	Cambridge United	H	W	4–1	Williams, Bishop, Stansfield, Pluck	5,694	
2 March 2004	7th	Huddersfield Town	A	L	1–3	Way	9,395	
6 March 2004	7th	Scunthorpe United	A	L	0–3		3,355	
13 March 2004	7th	Bristol Rovers	H	W	4–0	Lockwood, El-Kholti, Williams, Pluck	8,726	
16 March 2004	7th	Doncaster Rovers	H	L	0–1		7,587	
27 March 2004	8th	Mansfield Town	H	D	1–1	Skiverton	6,002	
3 April 2004	8th	Torquay United	A	D	2–2	Way, Edwards	6,156	
10 April 2004	9th	Cheltenham Town	H	D	0–0		6,613	
12 April 2004	9th	Boston United	A	L	2–3	Weatherstone, Stansfield	2,848	
17 April 2004	9th	Bury	H	W	2–1	D. Rodrigues (2)	5,172	
20 April 2004	7th	York City	A	W	2–1	Terry, Lindegaard	2,802	
24 April 2004	7th	Southend United	A	W	2–0	D. Rodrigues (2)	5,676	
1 May 2004	8th	Hull City	H	L	1–2	H. Rodrigues	8,760	
8 May 2004	8th	Lincoln City	A	W	3–2	Stansfield, Edwards, Williams	8,154	

==== League table ====
Pos	Team	Pld	W	D	L	GF	GA	GD	Pts	Promotion or relegation
6	Northampton Town	46	22	9	15	58	51	+7	75	Qualification for the Third Division play-offs
7	Lincoln City	46	19	17	10	68	47	+21	74	Qualification for the Third Division play-offs
8	Yeovil Town	46	23	5	18	70	57	+13	74	
9	Oxford United	46	18	17	11	55	44	+11	71	
10	Swansea City	46	15	14	17	58	61	−3	59	

Rules for classification: In the Football League goals scored (GF) takes precedence over goal difference (GD).

=== FA Cup ===
FA Cup match details
Round	Date	Opponents	Venue	Result	Score F–A	Scorers	Attendance	Ref
First round	8 November 2003	Wrexham	H	W	4–1	Gall, Williams, Pluck, Edwards	5,049	
Second round	6 December 2003	Barnet	H	W	5–1	Pluck, Williams (2), Crittenden, Edwards	5,973	
Third round	4 January 2004	Liverpool	H	L	0–2		9,348	

=== League Cup ===
League Cup match details
Round	Date	Opponents	Venue	Result	Score F–A	Scorers	Attendance	Ref
First round	12 August 2003	Luton Town	A	L	1–4	Boyce (og)	4,337	

=== Football League Trophy ===
Football League Trophy match details
Round	Date	Opponents	Venue	Result	Score F–A	Scorers	Attendance	Ref
First round	14 October 2003	AFC Bournemouth	H	W	2–0	Edwards, Williams	5,035	
Second round	4 November 2003	Colchester United	H	D	2–2 (Note: Colchester United won 4–2 in a penalty shootout following a 2–2 draw after silver goal extra time.)	Edwards, Gall	3,052	

== Squad statistics ==
Numbers in parentheses denote appearances as substitute.
Players with squad numbers struck through and marked † left the club during the playing season.
Players with names in italics and marked * were on loan from another club for the whole of their season with Yeovil.
Players listed with no appearances have been in the matchday squad but only as unused substitutes.

No.	Position	Nationality	Name	Apps	Goals	Apps	Goals	Apps	Goals	Apps	Goals	Apps	Goals	Yellow card	Red card
No.	Position	Nationality	Name	League		FA Cup		League Cup		FL Trophy		Total		Discipline	
1	Goalkeeper	England	Chris Weale	35	0	3	0	1	0	1	0	40	0	0	0
2	Defender	England	Adam Lockwood	43	4	3	0	1	0	2	0	49	4	6	0
3	Defender	Morocco	Abdou El-Kholti	19 (4)	1	0 (1)	0	0 (1)	0	1	0	20 (6)	1	3	0
4	Defender	England	Terry Skiverton	25 (1)	2	3	0	0	0	2	0	30 (1)	2	7	0
5	Defender	England	Colin Pluck	36	4	3	2	0	0	2	0	41	6	8	0
6	Midfielder	England	Darren Way	38 (1)	5	2	0	1	0	2	0	43 (1)	5	6	0
7	Forward	England	Adam Stansfield	7 (24)	6	0 (2)	0	0	0	0 (2)	0	7 (28)	6	0	0
8	Midfielder	England	Lee Johnson	45	5	3	0	1	0	2	0	51	5	9	0
9	Forward	Wales	Kevin Gall	39 (4)	8	3	1	1	0	2	1	45 (4)	10	4	0
10	Midfielder	England	Nick Crittenden	20 (9)	2	3	1	1	0	1	0	25 (9)	3	0	0
~~11~~ †	Defender	England	Ronnie Bull *	7	0	0	0	0	0	0	0	7	0	3	0
~~11~~ †	Forward	England	Lee Matthews *	2 (2)	0	0	0	0	0	0	0	2 (2)	0	0	0
12	Defender	Portugal	Hugo Rodrigues	23 (11)	1	2	0	1	0	1	0	27 (11)	1	8	0
13	Goalkeeper	England	Steve Collis	11	0	0	0	0	0	1	0	12	0	0	0
14	Defender	Ireland	Roy O'Brien	13	0	0	0	1	0	0	0	14	0	0	0
15	Defender	England	Stephen Reed	3 (2)	0	0	0	0 (1)	0	0 (1)	0	3 (4)	0	1	1
16	Midfielder	England	Andy Lindegaard	12 (11)	2	0 (1)	0	0 (1)	0	0	0	12 (13)	2	2	0
17	Forward	England	Jake Edwards	17 (10)	6	1 (1)	2	0	0	2	2	20 (11)	10	0	1
18	Forward	England	Kirk Jackson	19 (11)	5	1 (2)	0	1	0	0	0	21 (13)	5	2	0
~~19~~ †	Forward	England	Chris Giles	0 (1)	0	0	0	0	0	0	0	0 (1)	0	0	0
19	Defender	England	Nathan Talbott	0 (1)	0	0	0	0	0	0	0	0 (1)	0	0	0
20	Midfielder	Wales	Gavin Williams	42	9	3	3	1	0	2	1	48	13	9	1
22	Midfielder	England	Lee Elam	6 (6)	1	0	0	0	0	0	0	6 (6)	1	2	0
23	Midfielder	England	Jamie Gosling	4 (8)	1	0 (2)	0	1	0	0 (2)	0	5 (12)	1	1	0
24	Midfielder	England	Paul Terry	22 (12)	1	3	0	0	0	1 (1)	0	26 (13)	1	2	1
25	Midfielder	England	Simon Weatherstone	11 (4)	1	0	0	0	0	0	0	11 (4)	1	1	0
~~26~~ †	Forward	England	Andy Bishop *	4 (1)	2	0	0	0	0	0	0	4 (1)	2	0	0
27	Forward	Portugal	Dani Rodrigues	3 (1)	4	0	0	0	0	0	0	3 (1)	4	0	0
30	Goalkeeper	England	Jon Sheffield	0	0	0	0	0	0	0	0	0	0	0	0
32	Goalkeeper	England	Ryan Northmore *	0	0	0	0	0	0	0	0	0	0	0	0

Players not included in matchday squads
No.	Position	Nationality	Name
21	Midfielder	England	Steve Thompson
~~–~~ †	Midfielder	Jamaica	Jermaine Johnson *

== See also ==
- 2003–04 in English football
- List of Yeovil Town F.C. seasons
