= 2003–04 Wolverhampton Wanderers F.C. season =

English football club season

Wolverhampton Wanderers
2003–04 season
- Chairman: Sir Jack Hayward OBE (until 19 December); Rick Hayward (from 19 December)
- Manager: Dave Jones
- Stadium: Molineux
- FA Premier League: 20th (relegated)
- FA Cup: Fourth round
- League Cup: Fourth round
- Top goalscorer: League: Henri Camara (7); All: Alex Rae (8)
- Highest home attendance: 29,396 (vs Manchester United, 17 January 2004)
- Lowest home attendance: 10,232 (vs Darlington, 23 September 2003)
- Average home league attendance: 28,864 (league only)

The 2003–04 season was the 105th full season of competitive league football in the history of English football club Wolverhampton Wanderers. They played the season in the Premiership, the highest level of English football. This marked their first ever appearance in the modern Premier League, and their first season in the top flight since 1983–84. The club had been promoted after having won the play-off final at the end of the previous season to earn the final promotion spot.

Their return to the top level proved short-lived as the team struggled throughout the campaign and were eventually relegated in 20th place, finishing bottom of the division on goal difference, seven points short of safety. They were officially relegated after failing to win their penultimate game, although their vastly inferior goal difference meant that survival was effectively ruled out on 1 May 2004, despite victory, owing to relegation rivals Manchester City also winning.

Wolves became the third team in Premier League history to fail to win an away game during a season. Contributing to this outcome was a series of serious injuries to key players, with Matt Murray and Joleon Lescott missing almost the entire season and Mark Kennedy and Kenny Miller kept out for long periods.

== Pre-season ==
Wolves split their squad into two groups, one led by manager Dave Jones, another by coach Terry Connor after assistant manager John Ward left the club. Preparations also included a week's warm weather training in Jerez, Spain. A planned friendly against Dutch side ADO Den Haag was cancelled on the day of the game after a water leak hit the venue, Telford United's Bucks Head stadium. Only the final friendly was held at Wolves' Molineux home.

14 July 2003	Bristol Rovers	0–1	Wolverhampton Wanderers	Bristol
19:45 BST		Report	Melligan 15'	Stadium: Memorial Stadium; Attendance: 4,464; Referee: Mick Fletcher

14 July 2003	Hereford United	1–1	Wolverhampton Wanderers	Hereford
19:45 BST	Purdie 16'	Report	Proudlock 57'	Stadium: Edgar Street; Attendance: 1,895; Referee: S. Davis

16 July 2003	Swindon Town	0–0	Wolverhampton Wanderers	Swindon
19:30 BST		Report		Stadium: County Ground; Attendance: 3,916; Referee: Steve Tanner

26 July 2003	Morecambe	6–1	Wolverhampton Wanderers	Morecambe
15:00 BST	Curtis 4', 40'; Rigoglioso 13'; Howell 17'; Dodgeson 79'; Carleton 83'	Report	Andrews 68'	Stadium: Christie Park; Attendance: 1,521; Referee: Lee Mason

29 July 2003	Yeovil Town	2–1	Wolverhampton Wanderers	Yeovil
19:30 BST	Butler 42' (o.g.); Gall 62'	Report	Rae 88'	Stadium: Huish Park; Attendance: 5,884; Referee: Paul Armstrong

2 August 2003	Coventry City	2–1	Wolverhampton Wanderers	Coventry
15:00 BST	Adebola 52'; Davenport 72'	Report	Cooper 79'	Stadium: Highfield Road; Referee: Andrew Penn

4 August 2003	Worcester City	2–3	Wolverhampton Wanderers	Worcester
19:45 BST	Kelly 31'; Middleton 88'	Report	Jones 7', 10', 15'	Stadium: St George's Lane; Attendance: 2,511; Referee: Andre Marriner

8 August 2003	Wolverhampton Wanderers	2–0	Boavista	Wolverhampton
19:45 BST	Iversen 52'; Verpakovskis 84'	Report		Stadium: Molineux; Attendance: 10,318; Referee: Graham Poll

== FA Premier League ==
A total of 20 teams competed in the FA Premiership in the 2003–04 season. Each team would play every other team twice, once at their stadium, and once at the opposition's. Three points were awarded to teams for each win, one point per draw, and none for defeats. The provisional fixture list was released on 19 June 2003, but was subject to change in the event of matches being selected for television coverage or police concerns.

16 August 2003 1	Blackburn Rovers	5–1	Wolverhampton Wanderers	Blackburn
15:00 BST	Amoruso 17'; Thompson 29'; Emerton 52'; Cole 79', 87'	Report	Iversen 71'	Stadium: Ewood Park; Attendance: 26,270; Referee: Jeff Winter

23 August 2003 2	Wolverhampton Wanderers	0–4	Charlton Athletic	Wolverhampton
15:00 BST		Report	Euell 5'; Jensen 15'; Bartlett 25', 33'	Stadium: Molineux; Attendance: 27,327; Referee: Phil Dowd

27 August 2003 3	Manchester United	1–0	Wolverhampton Wanderers	Manchester
20:00 BST	O'Shea 10'	Report		Stadium: Old Trafford; Attendance: 67,648; Referee: Graham Poll

30 August 2003 4	Wolverhampton Wanderers	0–0	Portsmouth	Wolverhampton
15:00 BST		Report		Stadium: Molineux; Attendance: 28,860; Referee: Andy D'Urso

13 September 2003 5	Southampton	2–0	Wolverhampton Wanderers	Southampton
15:00 BST	Beattie 37' (pen.), 52'	Report		Stadium: St Mary's Stadium; Attendance: 31,711; Referee: Uriah Rennie

20 September 2003 6	Wolverhampton Wanderers	0–5	Chelsea	Wolverhampton
12:30 BST		Report	Lampard 17'; Hasselbaink 36'; Duff 52'; Crespo 67', 90+1'	Stadium: Molineux; Attendance: 29,208; Referee: Matt Messias

27 September 2003 7	Bolton Wanderers	1–1	Wolverhampton Wanderers	Bolton
15:00 BST	Davies 85'	Report	Rae 30'	Stadium: Reebok Stadium; Attendance: 27,043; Referee: Mike Dean

4 October 2003 8	Wolverhampton Wanderers	1–0	Manchester City	Wolverhampton
15:00 BST	Cameron 75'	Report		Stadium: Molineux; Attendance: 29,386; Referee: Jeff Winter

18 October 2003 9	Fulham	0–0	Wolverhampton Wanderers	London
15:00 BST		Report		Stadium: Loftus Road; Attendance: 17,031; Referee: Howard Webb

25 October 2003 10	Wolverhampton Wanderers	4–3	Leicester City	Wolverhampton
15:00 BST	Cameron 52', 60' (pen.); Rae 68'; Camara 86'	Report	Ferdinand 12', 15'; Scimeca 35'	Stadium: Molineux; Attendance: 28,578; Referee: Peter Walton

1 November 2003 11	Middlesbrough	2–0	Wolverhampton Wanderers	Middlesbrough
15:00 GMT	Mendieta 73'; Juninho 83'	Report		Stadium: Riverside Stadium; Attendance: 30,305; Referee: Steve Dunn

8 November 2003 12	Wolverhampton Wanderers	1–1	Birmingham City	Wolverhampton
12:30 GMT	Iversen 66'	Report	Forssell 49'	Stadium: Molineux; Attendance: 28,831; Referee: Graham Barber

22 November 2003 13	Everton	2–0	Wolverhampton Wanderers	Liverpool
15:00 GMT	Radzinski 16'; Kilbane 19'	Report		Stadium: Goodison Park; Attendance: 40,190; Referee: Mike Riley

29 November 2003 14	Wolverhampton Wanderers	1–1	Newcastle United	Wolverhampton
12:30 GMT	Blake 27'	Report	Shearer 31'	Stadium: Molineux; Attendance: 29,344; Referee: Steve Bennett

6 December 2003 15	Tottenham Hotspur	5–2	Wolverhampton Wanderers	London
15:00 GMT	Keane 29', 75', 83'; Kanouté 50'; Dalmat 90'	Report	Ince 30'; Rae 84'	Stadium: White Hart Lane; Attendance: 34,825; Referee: Uriah Rennie

14 December 2003 16	Aston Villa	3–2	Wolverhampton Wanderers	Birmingham
12:00 GMT	Ángel 21', 24'; Barry 48'	Report	Rae 36'; Kennedy 80'	Stadium: Villa Park; Attendance: 36,964; Referee: Graham Poll

26 December 2003 17	Arsenal	3–0	Wolverhampton Wanderers	London
12:00 GMT	Craddock 13' (o.g.); Henry 20', 89'	Report		Stadium: Highbury; Attendance: 38,003; Referee: Phil Dowd

28 December 2003 18	Wolverhampton Wanderers	3–1	Leeds United	Wolverhampton
15:00 GMT	Smith 18' (o.g.); Iversen 48', 90+1'	Report	Duberry 3'	Stadium: Molineux; Attendance: 29,139; Referee: Andy D'Urso

7 January 2004 19	Wolverhampton Wanderers	2–2	Blackburn Rovers	Wolverhampton
19:45 GMT	Butler 63'; Rae 72'	Report	Cole 14'; Yorke 78'	Stadium: Molineux; Attendance: 27,393; Referee: Neale Barry

10 January 2004 20	Charlton Athletic	2–0	Wolverhampton Wanderers	London
15:00 GMT	Euell 38', 79'	Report		Stadium: The Valley; Attendance: 26,148; Referee: Rob Styles

17 January 2004 21	Wolverhampton Wanderers	1–0	Manchester United	Wolverhampton
12:30 GMT	Miller 67'	Report		Stadium: Molineux; Attendance: 29,396; Referee: Andy D'Urso

21 January 2004 22	Wolverhampton Wanderers	1–1	Liverpool	Wolverhampton
19:45 GMT	Miller 90'	Report	Cheyrou 42'	Stadium: Molineux; Attendance: 29,380; Referee: Barry Knight

31 January 2004 23	Portsmouth	0–0	Wolverhampton Wanderers	Portsmouth
15:00 GMT		Report		Stadium: Fratton Park; Attendance: 20,112; Referee: Howard Webb

7 February 2004 24	Wolverhampton Wanderers	1–3	Arsenal	Wolverhampton
15:00 GMT	Ganea 26'	Report	Bergkamp 9'; Henry 58'; Toure 63'	Stadium: Molineux; Attendance: 29,392; Referee: Phil Dowd

10 February 2004 25	Leeds United	4–1	Wolverhampton Wanderers	Leeds
19:45 GMT	Smith 14'; Matteo 41'; Milner 62'; Viduka 90+1'	Report	Ganea 21'	Stadium: Elland Road; Attendance: 36,867; Referee: Mike Dean

21 February 2004 26	Wolverhampton Wanderers	2–1	Fulham	Wolverhampton
15:00 GMT	Ince 20'; Cort 51'	Report	Malbranque 84'	Stadium: Molineux; Attendance: 28,424; Referee: Howard Webb

28 February 2004 27	Leicester City	0–0	Wolverhampton Wanderers	Leicester
15:00 GMT		Report		Stadium: Walkers Stadium; Attendance: 31,768; Referee: Jeff Winter

14 March 2004 28	Wolverhampton Wanderers	0–4	Aston Villa	Wolverhampton
12:30 GMT	Ganea (penalty missed) 45'	Report	Hitzlsperger 7'; Mellberg 18'; Ángel 24', 59'	Stadium: Molineux; Attendance: 29,386; Referee: Paul Durkin

20 March 2004 29	Liverpool	1–0	Wolverhampton Wanderers	Liverpool
15:00 GMT	Hyypiä 90+2'	Report		Stadium: Anfield; Attendance: 43,795; Referee: Rob Styles

27 March 2004 30	Chelsea	5–2	Wolverhampton Wanderers	London
15:00 GMT	Melchiot 4'; Lampard 70'; Hasselbaink 77', 87', 90+3'	Report	Camara 23'; Craddock 57'	Stadium: Stamford Bridge; Attendance: 41,215; Referee: Graham Barber

3 April 2004 31	Wolverhampton Wanderers	1–4	Southampton	Wolverhampton
15:00 BST	Camara 72'	Report	Beattie 25'; Lundekvam 58'; Phillips 89', 90+3'	Stadium: Molineux; Attendance: 29,106; Referee: Mark Halsey

10 April 2004 32	Manchester City	3–3	Wolverhampton Wanderers	Manchester
15:00 BST	Anelka 25'; Sibierski 39'; Wright-Phillips 90+3'	Report	Kennedy 13'; Cort 23'; Cameron (penalty missed) 65'; Camara 78'	Stadium: City of Manchester Stadium; Attendance: 47,248; Referee: Jeff Winter

12 April 2004 33	Wolverhampton Wanderers	1–2	Bolton Wanderers	Wolverhampton
15:00 BST	Camara 44'	Report	Pedersen 43'; Davies 90+2'	Stadium: Molineux; Attendance: 28,695; Referee: Uriah Rennie

17 April 2004 34	Wolverhampton Wanderers	2–0	Middlesbrough	Wolverhampton
15:00 BST	Cort 28'; Camara 62' (penalty missed) 90'	Report		Stadium: Molineux; Attendance: 27,975; Referee: Andy D'Urso

25 April 2004 35	Birmingham City	2–2	Wolverhampton Wanderers	Birmingham
12:00 BST	Forssell 34'; Morrison 41'	Report	Cameron 6'; Cort 75'	Stadium: St Andrew's; Attendance: 29,494; Referee: Mike Dean

1 May 2004 36	Wolverhampton Wanderers	2–1	Everton	Wolverhampton
15:00 BST	Camara 55'; Cort 84'	Report	Osman 3'	Stadium: Molineux; Attendance: 29,395; Referee: Mike Riley

9 May 2004 37	Newcastle United	1–1	Wolverhampton Wanderers	Newcastle upon Tyne
15:00 BST	Bowyer 38'; Shearer (penalty missed) 83'	Report	Ganea 70'	Stadium: St James' Park; Attendance: 52,139; Referee: Matt Messias

15 May 2004 38	Wolverhampton Wanderers	0–2	Tottenham Hotspur	Wolverhampton
15:00 BST		Report	Keane 34'; Defoe 57'	Stadium: Molineux; Attendance: 29,389; Referee: Steve Bennett

Final table

Pos	Team	Pld	W	D	L	GF	GA	GD	Pts	Qualification or relegation
16	Manchester City	38	9	14	15	55	54	+1	41	
17	Everton	38	9	12	17	45	57	−12	39	
18	Leicester City (R)	38	6	15	17	48	65	−17	33	Relegation to the Football League Championship
19	Leeds United (R)	38	8	9	21	40	79	−39	33	Relegation to the Football League Championship
20	Wolverhampton Wanderers (R)	38	7	12	19	38	77	−39	33	Relegation to the Football League Championship

Source: Premier League
Rules for classification: 1) points; 2) goal difference; 3) number of goals scored.
(R) Relegated

Results summary

Overall								Home						Away					
Pld	W	D	L	GF	GA	GD	Pts	W	D	L	GF	GA	GD	W	D	L	GF	GA	GD
38	7	12	19	38	77	−39	33	7	5	7	23	35	−12	0	7	12	15	42	−27

Source: Statto.com

== FA Cup ==
3 January 2004 R3	Kidderminster Harriers	1–1	Wolverhampton Wanderers	Kidderminster
15:00 GMT	Williams 77'	Report	Rae 89'	Stadium: Aggborough; Attendance: 6,005; Referee: Chris Foy

13 January 2004 R3 rep.	Wolverhampton Wanderers	2–0	Kidderminster Harriers	Wolverhampton
19:45 GMT	Miller 36', 65'	Report		Stadium: Molineux; Attendance: 25,808; Referee: Matt Messias

25 January 2004 R4	Wolverhampton Wanderers	1–3	West Ham United	Wolverhampton
14:00 GMT	Ganea 23'	Report	Deane 4'; Harewood 21'; Connolly 32'	Stadium: Molineux; Attendance: 24,413; Referee: Mark Halsey

== League Cup ==
23 September 2003 R2	Wolverhampton Wanderers	2–0	Darlington	Wolverhampton
19:45 BST	Rae 37'; Guðjónsson 53'	Report		Stadium: Molineux; Attendance: 10,232; Referee: Keith Hill

28 October 2003 R3	Wolverhampton Wanderers	2–0	Burnley	Wolverhampton
19:45 GMT	Miller 48'; Craddock 81'	Report		Stadium: Molineux; Attendance: 18,548; Referee: Chris Foy

2 December 2003 R4	Arsenal	5–1	Wolverhampton Wanderers	London
19:45 GMT	Aliadière 24', 71'; Kanu 68'; Wiltord 79'; Fàbregas 88'	Report	Rae 81'	Stadium: Highbury; Attendance: 28,161; Referee: Dermot Gallagher

== Statistics ==
Key:
‡ On loan from another club * First appearance(s) for the club

- # = Squad number
- Pos = Playing position
- P = Number of games played
- G = Number of goals scored
- GK = Goalkeeper
- DF = Defender
- MF = Midfielder
- FW = Forward
- = Yellow cards
- = Red cards
- † Permanent player left club during the season
- ¤ Loaned to another club for part or all of season

Correct as of end of season. Starting appearances are listed first, followed by substitute appearances in parentheses where applicable.

No.	Pos	Name	P	G	P	G	P	G	P	G	A yellow card	A red card	Notes
No.	Pos	Name	League		FA Cup		League Cup		Total		Discipline		Notes
1	GK	(England) Michael Oakes	21	0	3	0	1(1)	0	25(1)	0	0	0	
2	DF	(Republic of Ireland) Denis Irwin	30(2)	0	1	0	0	0	31(2)	0	5	0	
3	DF	(England) Lee Naylor	37(1)	0	2	0	3	0	42(1)	0	7	0	
4	MF	(Scotland) Alex Rae	27(6)	5	1	1	2(1)	2	30(7)	8	10	1	
5	DF	(England) Joleon Lescott	0	0	0	0	0	0	0	0	0	0	
6	DF	(Republic of Ireland) Paul Butler	37	1	2	0	2	0	41	1	8	0	
7	MF	(England) Shaun Newton	20(8)	0	2	0	0(2)	0	22(10)	0	1	0	
8	MF	(England) Paul Ince (c)	32	2	1	0	2	0	35	2	14	1	
9	FW	(Wales) Nathan Blake	10(3)	1	0	0	1	0	11(3)	1	3	0	
10	MF	(Scotland) Colin Cameron	25(5)	4	2	0	1	0	28(5)	4	6	0	
11	MF	(Republic of Ireland) Mark Kennedy	28(3)	2	3	0	1(1)	0	32(4)	2	1	0	
12	DF	(England) Jody Craddock	31(1)	1	2(1)	0	3	1	36(2)	2	3	0	
13	GK	(England) Matt Murray	1	0	0	0	1	0	2	0	0	0	
14	MF	(Portugal) Silas	2(7)	0	1(2)	0	2	0	5(9)	0	0	0	
15	MF	(England) Kevin Cooper ¤	0(1)	0	0	0	0	0	0(1)	0	0	0	
16	FW	(Scotland) Kenny Miller	17(8)	2	3	2	2	1	22(8)	5	2	0	
17	FW	(Senegal) Henri Camara	29(1)	7	0	0	2	0	31(1)	7	3	0	
18	FW	(Nigeria) George Ndah	0	0	0	0	0	0	0	0	0	0	
19	FW	(Norway) Steffen Iversen	11(5)	4	1(1)	0	2	0	14(6)	4	1	0	
20	FW	(England) Adam Proudlock †	0	0	0	0	0	0	0	0	0	0	
20	FW	(Romania) Vio Ganea	6(10)	3	2(1)	1	0	0	8(11)	4	4	0	
21	DF	(Iceland) Ívar Ingimarsson †	0	0	0	0	0	0	0	0	0	0	
21	GK	(Wales) Paul Jones	16	0	0	0	0	0	16	0	0	0	
22	DF	(Ukraine) Oleh Luzhnyi	4(2)	0	2	0	2	0	8(2)	0	0	0	
23	DF	(Northern Ireland) Mark Clyde	6(3)	0	3	0	0	0	9(3)	0	1	0	
24	MF	(Republic of Ireland) Keith Andrews ¤	1	0	1	0	1	0	3	0	1	0	
25	DF	(Nigeria) Isaac Okoronkwo	7	0	0	0	1	0	8	0	2	0	
26	MF	(Iceland) Joey Guðjónsson ‡	5(6)	0	1(1)	0	3	1	9(7)	0	3	0	
27	FW	(England) Carl Cort	13(3)	5	0	0	0	0	13(3)	5	0	0	
28	GK	(England) Andy Marshall ‡	0	0	0	0	1	0	1	0	0	0	
29	FW	(England) Dean Sturridge ¤	2(3)	0	0	0	0(1)	0	2(4)	0	0	0	
30	MF	(Morocco) Hassan Kachloul ‡	0(4)	0	0	0	0	0	0(4)	0	0	0	
31	MF	(Republic of Ireland) John Melligan ¤	0	0	0	0	0	0	0	0	0	0	
32	MF	(Northern Ireland) Sammy Clingan	0	0	0	0	0	0	0	0	0	0	
33	FW	(England) Jimmi Lee Jones †	0	0	0	0	0	0	0	0	0	0	
34	MF	(Republic of Ireland) Ian McGrane †	0	0	0	0	0	0	0	0	0	0	
35	MF	(England) Marlon Walters	0	0	0	0	0	0	0	0	0	0	
36	GK	(Nigeria) Carl Ikeme	0	0	0	0	0	0	0	0	0	0	
37	FW	(England) Leon Clarke ¤	0	0	0(1)	0	0(2)	0	0(3)	0	0	0	
38	DF	(England) Keith Lowe	0	0	0	0	0	0	0	0	0	0	

== Awards ==
Award	Winner
Fans' Player of the Season	Henri Camara
Young Player of the Season	Mark Clyde
Academy Player of the Season	Kevin O'Connor

== Transfers ==
=== In ===
Date	Player	From	Fee
7 July 2003	(Ukraine) Oleh Luzhnyi	Unattached	Free
8 July 2003	(Nigeria) Isaac Okoronkwo	(Ukraine) Shakhtar Donetsk	Free
9 July 2003	(Portugal) Silas	(Portugal) União de Leiria	£1 million
31 July 2003	(England) Jody Craddock	Sunderland	£1.75 million
1 August 2003	(Senegal) Henri Camara	(France) Sedan	£1.5 million
1 August 2003	(Norway) Steffen Iversen	Tottenham Hotspur	Free
31 December 2003	(Romania) Ionel Ganea	(Turkey) Bursaspor	Free
25 January 2004	(England) Carl Cort	Newcastle United	£2 million
29 January 2004	(Wales) Paul Jones	Southampton	£250,000

=== Out ===
Date	Player	To	Fee
June 2003	(England) Michael Branch	Released	Free
June 2003	(Republic of Ireland) Kenny Coleman	Released	Free
June 2003	(England) Marc Edworthy	Released	Free
June 2003	(France) Ludovic Pollet	Released	Free
June 2003	(Republic of Ireland) Graham Ward	Released	Free
25 June 2003	(Guinea) Mo Camara	Burnley	Free
22 July 2003	(Belgium) Cédric Roussel	(Belgium) Racing Genk	Undisclosed
5 September 2003	(England) Adam Proudlock	Sheffield Wednesday	£150,000
10 October 2003	(Republic of Ireland) Ian McGrane	Released	Free
23 October 2003	(Iceland) Ívar Ingimarsson	Reading	£100,000
17 March 2004	(England) Jimmi-Lee Jones	Released	Free
25 March 2004	(England) Nathan Talbott	Yeovil Town	Free

=== Loans in ===
Start date	Player	From	End date
29 August 2003	(Iceland) Joey Guðjónsson	(Spain) Real Betis	End of season
1 September 2003	(Morocco) Hassan Kachloul	Aston Villa	16 January 2004
12 November 2003	(England) Andy Marshall	Ipswich Town	12 January 2004

=== Loans out ===
Start date	Player	To	End date
8 August 2003	(Republic of Ireland) Keith Andrews	Stoke City	9 November 2003
15 August 2003	(England) Jimmi-Lee Jones	Forest Green Rovers	15 September 2003
3 October 2003	(Republic of Ireland) John Melligan	Kidderminster Harriers	6 November 2003
18 November 2003	(Republic of Ireland) John Melligan	Doncaster Rovers	End of season
30 December 2003	(England) Dean Sturridge	Sheffield United	8 February 2004
7 January 2004	(England) Kevin Cooper	Sunderland	18 March 2004
12 March 2004	(Republic of Ireland) Keith Andrews	Walsall	End of season
19 March 2004	(England) Kevin Cooper	Norwich City	End of season
25 March 2004	(England) Leon Clarke	Kidderminster Harriers	End of season

== Kit ==
The season saw a new away kit, manufactured by Admiral, that was all black with minor gold trim. The home kit was the same as the previous season. Doritos sponsored the club for a second and final season.
