= Hugo Rodrigues =

Portuguese footballer

Personal information
- Full name: Hugo Rodrigues
- Date of birth: 22 November 1979 (age 46)
- Place of birth: Santa Maria da Feira, Portugal
- Height: 2.03 m (6 ft 8 in)
- Position: Centre-back

Youth career
- Feirense

Senior career*
Years	Team	Apps	(Gls)
- Paços de Brandão
- Perosinho
- Pedras Rubras
2003–2004	Yeovil Town	34	(1)
- * Club domestic league appearances and goals

Hugo Rodrigues (born 22 November 1979) is a Portuguese former footballer who played as a centre-back.

Noted as one of the tallest footballers to play in the Football League, Rodrigues started his career with local club C.D. Feirense before playing in the Portuguese lower division sides Paços de Brandão and Perosinho and then Portuguese Second Division side Pedras Rubras. After a local agent suggested he should try English football he signed for Third Division side Yeovil Town in 2003. Despite being offered a new contract he retired from professional football at the age of 24 and returned to Portugal to complete his university studies.

== Career ==
Rodrigues started his career as a youth player at Feirense, and as a 15-year-old he attracted interest from FC Porto but was denied the move after Feirense demanded £30,000 for his services, something unheard of in Portuguese football at the time. Having left Fierense, Rodrigues played lower league football in Portugal with Paços de Brandão and Perosinho, before joining Portuguese Second Division side Pedras Rubras, a club which allowed him to play whilst simultaneously completing his economics degree.

With Rodrigues wanting to play in England to help improve his English for his family's business, local agent Raul Sanha organised him a trial with newly promoted Football League Third Division side Yeovil Town. Rodrigues signed for Yeovil, on 24 July 2003 following a successful trial on a one-year contract. Rodrigues made his debut for Yeovil as the club's first substitute in the Football League on the opening day of the 2003–04 season against Rochdale, on 9 August 2003. Rodrigues also received the club's first Football League yellow card in that same match. Even prior to his Football League debut, Rodrigues had gained national media attention due to his height, and at 6 ft 8 in (2.03 m) was acclaimed as the tallest player in the Football League. On 4 January 2004, Yeovil faced Liverpool in the FA Cup third round, with Liverpool leading 1–0 Rodrigues conceded a penalty after he was adjudged to have fouled winger Harry Kewell. After the match Rodrigues claimed that Kewell admitted to "diving" to win the penalty, a claim that was later denied by Kewell. On 1 May 2004, Rodrigues scored his first, and only, goal for Yeovil with a powerful header from a free-kick in a 2–1 defeat against Hull City. Rodrigues ended the season with 38 appearances in all competitions for Yeovil, as he helped the club finish eighth in their first season in the Football League, just missing out on the play-offs on goal difference

Rodrigues was offered a new contract at the end of the season by Yeovil manager Gary Johnson, but after the departure of fellow Portuguese footballer Dani Rodrigues, and a teammate of his at Feirense, Johnson revealed that Rodrigues had rejected the offer of a new contract to return to his native Portugal.

After leaving Yeovil, Rodrigues explained the reasons behind his departure that he "was missing my family so much" and that he "might have remained had Dani (Rodrigues) stayed on but went home and settled for playing part-time with [his] friends."

== Career statistics ==
Appearances and goals by club, season and competition
Club	Season	League			FA Cup		League Cup		Other		Total	
Club	Season	Division	Apps	Goals	Apps	Goals	Apps	Goals	Apps	Goals	Apps	Goals
Yeovil Town	2003–04	Third Division	34	1	2	0	1	0	1 (Note: Appearance in Football League Trophy)	0	38	1
Career total			34	1	2	0	1	0	1	0	38	1

== Personal life ==
Born in Santa Maria da Feira he grew up in the village of Paços de Brandão, near Porto, where his parents ran their own business making and exporting wine corks. Prior to joining Yeovil, Rodrigues had completed five years of a six-year economics degree course at the Lusíada University of Porto. Having retired from professional football after leaving Yeovil and completing his degree, Rodrigues worked in a bank dealing with cork companies who found themselves in financial difficulties.
