= Leon Kelly (disambiguation) =

Leon Kelly was an artist.

Leon Kelly may also refer to:

- Leon Kelly (footballer)
- Leon Kelly, N-Trance
