= Darren Way =

English footballer (born 1979)

Personal information
- Full name: Darren Way
- Date of birth: 21 November 1979 (age 46)
- Place of birth: Plymouth, England
- Position: Midfielder

Team information
- Current team: Torquay United (first-team coach)

Youth career
- 1994–1998: Norwich City

Senior career*
Years	Team	Apps	(Gls)
1998–2000	Norwich City	0	(0)
2000–2006	Yeovil Town	207	(26)
2006–2008	Swansea City	16	(0)
2007–2008	→ Yeovil Town (loan)	8	(1)
2008–2010	Yeovil Town	15	(2)
Total		246	(29)

International career
1995–1996	England U16	6	(0)
2002–2003	England National Game XI	3	(1)

Managerial career
- 2015–2019: Yeovil Town (Note: Way first served as interim manager for six matches in December 2015. Way was officially appointed as Yeovil's manager on 31 December 2015.)
- 2024–2026: Bath City
- * Club domestic league appearances and goals

Darren Way (born 21 November 1979) is an English professional football manager and former player.

A hard tackling centre-midfielder as a player, Way started his career at Norwich City as an associate schoolboy in 1994, and while there was selected for the England U16 side making six appearances. He progressed through the youth ranks to captain the reserve side and earn a professional contract at Carrow Road but was released in the summer of 2000 after failing to make a first team appearance. Following his release Way returned to the South West and signed for Football Conference side Yeovil Town. While playing for Yeovil in the Conference he was called up several times to the England National Game XI side making three appearances, scoring once.

A firm fans favourite during his time at Yeovil as a player, affectionately nicknamed "Weasel" by the fans, he scored twelve goals in his first season as the club narrowly missed out on promotion to the Football League before forming a strong partnership with fellow central midfielder Lee Johnson he was part of the side that won the FA Trophy, earned promotion to the Football League for the first time in the club's history and promotion to League One in 2005. Way's performances in the 2004–05 season saw him recognised by his fellow professionals and awarded a place in the League Two team of the year. Way left the Glovers, in January 2006, after five and a half years to sign for Swansea City for a fee of £150,000. His time in South Wales though was plagued with injuries, during one of his recoveries from injury he returned to Yeovil on loan for six weeks. In the summer of 2008, Way left Swansea having made only 21 appearances and returned to Yeovil. In December 2008, Way was involved in a serious car accident whilst a passenger in a car, leaving him with injuries which included a broken femur and broken hip. The accident ended his playing career, having made 274 appearances across three spells for Yeovil, and in February 2010 he announced his retirement and became the club's new first team coach.

After five years as the club's first team coach, and briefly acting assistant manager, Way was appointed interim manager following the sacking of Paul Sturrock, on 1 December 2015. After six games in an interim role, Way was officially appointed as Yeovil's manager on 31 December 2015. Way spent three years in charge of The Glovers guiding the club to 19th, 20th and 19th-place finishes respectively but with the club facing the threat of relegation out of the Football League he was sacked in March 2019.

== Playing career ==
=== Norwich City ===
Born in Plymouth, Devon, he was part of the Plymouth Argyle centre of excellence, before at the age of fourteen he chose to sign for Norwich City as an associate schoolboy, having been scouted by Gordon Bennett, whilst rejecting offers from Everton and Bristol City. Way spent the next two years travelling from Plymouth to Norwich, spending seven hours there and seven hours back on the train each weekend, along with future Wales international and Liverpool striker Craig Bellamy who he used to meet in Bristol. While progressing through the youth ranks at Norwich, Way played for the England schoolboys side on six occasions, alongside Steven Gerrard and Michael Owen. In May 1999, Way signed a one-year professional contract and sat on the bench for a number of first team matches. Having only made six appearances for the reserve side in the 1999–2000 season, in March 2000, Way was informed by Norwich manager Bryan Hamilton that he would be released at the end of the season. Following this Way had a trial with Second Division side Bristol Rovers playing a game for their reserve side. On 26 April 2000, he was released from his contract having not made an appearance for the Norwich first team.

=== Yeovil Town ===
In May 2000, following his release by Norwich, Way played in a trial match for Plymouth Argyle, before returning to link up with Bristol Rovers for pre-season training including going on a team-building trip to Dublin, but despite manager Ian Holloway wanting to sign Way, no contract was forthcoming. Having failed to win a contract with Rovers he also had a brief trial at Stevenage. His father then organised him a trial with Football Conference side Yeovil Town after talking to assistant Steve Thompson and reserve team manager Maurice O'Donnell, Way featured in a reserve team friendly 9–1 victory against Minehead in early August 2000. On 18 August 2000, Yeovil manager David Webb signed Way on a two-year contract, linking up with former Norwich youth teammate Barrington Belgrave. With manager Webb describing Way as "a talented midfield schemer". Way made his Yeovil debut the following day, on 19 August 2000, in a 2–0 victory over Kettering Town as a substitute for captain Terry Skiverton. Way scored his first goal for Yeovil with a penalty kick against Nuneaton Borough in a 2–0 victory, on 2 September 2000. Way immediately became a fans favourite at Yeovil earning the moniker "Weasel" to describe his hard working attitude. Way was part of the Yeovil side who progressed to the third round of the FA Cup, defeating Football League sides Colchester United 5–1 at home with Way scoring a penalty, and Blackpool 1–0 away with Way providing the assist for Nick Crittenden's winning goal. In the third round Yeovil travelled to Premier League side Bolton Wanderers and took the lead before succumbing to an injury time defeat. Way ended his first season with the club having made 51 appearances in all competitions, scoring twelve times, as Yeovil narrowly missed out on the Conference title. His performances in the Yeovil midfield led to his inclusion, alongside teammates Terry Skiverton and Nick Crittenden, in the 2000–01 Conference team of the year.

The end of the season saw manager Colin Addison forced out by chairman John Fry, with the club hiring Gary Johnson as his replacement, this heralded the arrival of his son Lee Johnson with whom Way would form a formidable midfield partnership. In November 2001, Way was called up for an England National Game XI trial match against a Southern Football League XI, but had to withdraw through injury. Way's season was interrupted by injuries as he made 34 appearances as Yeovil finished third in the Conference. Yeovil's season ended on a high when on 12 May 2002, they lifted the FA Trophy for the first time in the club's history defeating Stevenage Borough 2–0 in the final, with Way playing the full 90 minutes.

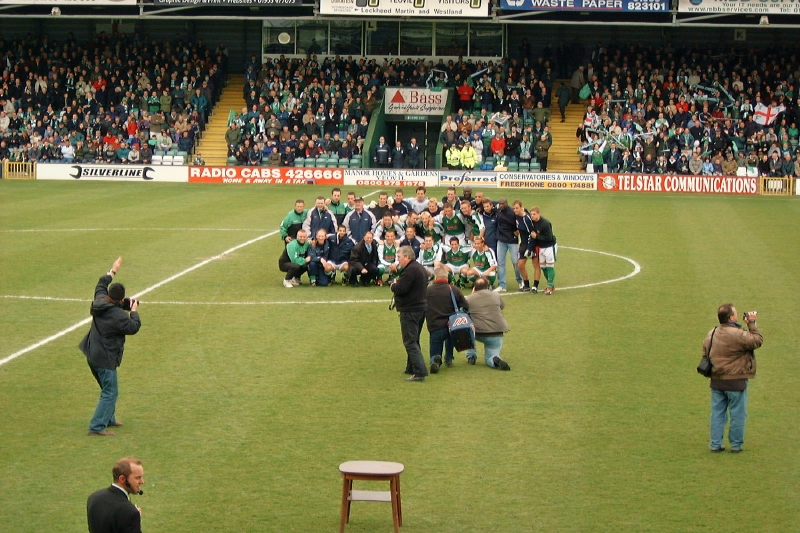
Yeovil Town celebrating their promotion to The Football League at Huish Park, 19 April 2003

The new season saw Yeovil allocate squad numbers for the first time in the club's history with Way wearing the number six shirt. After a strong start to the season, in November 2002, Way received his first call-up to the England National Game XI for an under-23 friendly against their Italian counterparts, with Way making his debut as a second-half substitute. The 2002–03 season saw Yeovil crowned Conference champions and secure promotion to the Football League for the first time in the club's history, Way made 48 appearances, but had to wait until 12 April 2003 for his first and only goal of the season. Scoring the opener in a 4–0 win away at Doncaster Rovers, on the day Yeovil celebrated promotion. The end of the season saw Way called up to the England National Game XI for the Four Nations Tournament, Way appeared in the first two matches, scoring the winner against holders Wales, as England won the title. Way was one of four Yeovil players chosen in the Conference team of the year at the end of season Conference AGM.

On 9 August 2003, with club captain Terry Skiverton out injured Way captained Yeovil in their first ever match in the Football League, a 3–1 victory away at Rochdale. In November 2003, Way suffered a stress fracture in his shin bone, the first occurrence of an injury which would plague him later in his career. Yeovil ended their first season in the Football League finishing in eighth place, missing out on a play-off place on goal difference, with Way scoring five times in 44 appearances in all competitions.

Way missed only one league match the following season as Yeovil won the League Two title and promotion, at the end of the season Way was one of five Yeovil players in PFA League Two Team of the Year. Way was also part of the Yeovil's historic run to the FA Cup fourth round that season, for only the second time in the club's history, scoring in the 3–0 third round victory away at Championship side Rotherham United. With the run coming to an end losing 3–2 away at Premier League side Charlton Athletic.

His first season in League One saw Way make sixteen appearances for Yeovil, before he suffered a fractured cheekbone and eye socket in a match against Gillingham in October 2005. The injury kept him out for a month but Way would only make two more appearances for Yeovil, scoring on his return in the FA Cup victory over Macclesfield Town on 15 November 2005, "with a spectacular shot from distance". In what turned out to be his final match for Yeovil ironically against Swansea City, Way suffered a recurrence of his shin injury which ruled him out until January. In January 2006, Way left Yeovil just a week after his midfield partner Lee Johnson to Hearts, as the Conference winning side began to be broken up.

=== Swansea City ===
On 20 January 2006, with his contract running out at the end of the season Way signed for fellow League One side Swansea City for an initial fee of around £150,000, signing on a three-and-a-half-year contract. Way made his debut for Swansea four days later in a 2–2 draw against Walsall in the Football League Trophy. After making only eight appearances for his new club, three in Swansea's victorious Football League Trophy campaign, in March 2006 Way suffered a recurrence of his shin injury and was ruled out for the rest of the season. After recovering from injury an enjoying a run in the Swansea side at the start of the 2006–07 season, Way once again suffered a recurrence of his shin fracture having surgery for a third time in March 2007.

==== Loan to Yeovil Town ====
On 15 November 2007, Way rejoined fellow League One side Yeovil Town on loan from Swansea until 1 January 2008, in an effort to regain match fitness after recovering from a shin injury which had prevented him from playing for Swansea's first team for over a year. After appearing in eight matches, despite Yeovil wanting to extend his loan Way, returned to Swansea.

==== Return to Swansea City ====
Upon his return from his loan at Yeovil, Way made a further four appearances for Swansea as the Welsh side were promoted to the Championship, Making his final appearance on 26 April 2008, in a 4–1 victory over Leyton Orient. In his two-and-a-half injury plagued years at Swansea, Way made just 21 appearances, and only six starts in the league.

=== Yeovil Town ===
On 8 July 2008, Way rejoined League One side Yeovil Town for a third-spell signing from Swansea City on a two-year contract, for a small fee "worth up to £50,000" equivalent to the conditional waiver of money the Glovers were owed by Swansea after the Welsh club secured promotion to the Championship at the end of the 2007–08 season. Yeovil manager Russell Slade described the signing as "one of the most important signings in the club's history". Way started the season well making 19 appearances in all competitions, scoring twice a late equaliser against Brighton & Hove Albion and the winner against Crewe Alexandra. His season though, and subsequently his career, was ended prematurely after he was involved in a severe car accident, on 17 December 2008. In Yeovil's match against Swindon Town three days later, Lee Peltier scorer of Yeovil's second, in a 3–2 victory, celebrated by revealing a message under his shirt showing support for Way. During his lengthy recovery, Way made his first appearance coming on as a substitute for the final seconds in his best friend Terry Skiverton's testimonial match, in July 2009. Way finally announced his retirement from playing thirteen months after his car accident in February 2010. On 23 July 2010, Way made his final playing appearance for Yeovil as a late substitute in his testimonial match against a Manchester United XI.

== Managerial career ==
=== Yeovil Town ===
During his recovery from his serious traffic accident in December 2008, Way acted unofficially as a backroom coach and scout for Yeovil, and after his retirement, in February 2010, Yeovil manager and his former teammate Terry Skiverton offered him a role as the club's technical coach. After the demoting of Terry Skiverton to assistant manager and the return of Gary Johnson in January 2012, Way remained in his role as technical coach. Way was involved in his third promotion with Yeovil as they defeated Brentford 2–1 to win the 2013 Football League One play-off final and earn promotion to the Championship for the first time in the club's history. Following the club's promotion Way, along with Johnson and Skiverton, signed a new two-year contract, after his agreement of a new contract the title of Way's role was changed to first team coach. Following the sacking of Gary Johnson in February 2015, with the club bottom of League One, Way was promoted to acting assistant manager to Terry Skiverton. Having failed to arrest the club's plight and with them all but confirmed as relegated from League Two, the club demoted Skiverton and Way back to their assistant and first team coaches roles respectively, hiring Paul Sturrock as the club's new first team manager.

On 1 December 2015, with the club bottom of League Two and having not won in twelve league matches Sturrock was sacked and Way placed in interim charge, with Skiverton as his assistant. In his first match in charge he guided Yeovil to a 1–0 victory over Stevenage in the FA Cup first round. After six matches in interim charge, having drawn three of his four league matches Way was appointed permanently. In his first match in permanent charge, Way guided Yeovil to his first league victory, their first league win in seventeen matches, with a 1–0 victory over fellow relegation rivals York City, on 2 January 2016. After three wins out of four league matches in January, Way was nominated for the League Two Manager of the Month award, but was beaten by eventual winner Northampton Town manager Chris Wilder. Yeovil's improved form continued in late February and March, with a six match unbeaten run, including four consecutive 1–0 victories and five consecutive clean sheets. Way received his second manager of the month nomination in three months, after amassing ten points from their five games in the month of March and keeping four clean sheets in the process, but was beaten by eventual winner Darrell Clarke. On 6 April 2016, having guided Yeovil to the brink of securing their League Two status, with the club fourteen points clear of the relegation zone, Way was awarded a new three-year contract.

In June 2017, Way completed his UEFA Pro Licence course.

In November 2018, Yeovil were knocked out of the FA Cup in the first round after losing 3–1 at home to non-league side Stockport County. For the second time in Way's tenure, the club had been knocked out by a non-league side in the first round. Despite the cup exit and a run of form that had seen the club only win one of its last nine league matches, Way was rewarded by the Yeovil board with a new extended contract until June 2021, with Way claiming the club were "in best place for five years". With the club having lost a further four consecutive matches following the signing of his new contract, Way attended a Supporters Alliance Meeting at which he was reported to have claimed that "he was a hero" and that "he could walk into any other club". He also said that he would not be at Yeovil for ever and that when he left he would be missed. He asserted that the fans knew nothing about football. The club's poor form continued into 2019, and after a 2–0 defeat to Milton Keynes Dons on 23 March, with securing survival in League Two no longer in the team's own hands, Way was sacked by the club.

=== Plymouth Argyle ===
In December 2019, he was appointed under-18s manager at Plymouth Argyle replacing former coach Kevin Hodges who had left the club the previous month, with Way taking up the role from January 2020.

=== Fleetwood Town ===
On 11 September 2023, Way joined EFL League One side Fleetwood Town to take up the role of assistant manager.

=== Bath City ===
On 23 December 2024, Way was appointed manager of National League South side Bath City. On 22 March 2026, Way was sacked by the club after a poor run of form had left the club seven points adrift of safety and under threat of relegation to the Southern League.

=== Torquay United ===
On 24 March 2026, Way joined the first-team coaching staff of National League South club Torquay United on a short-term deal until the end of the season. In June 2026, Way agreed a new contract to remain with Torquay as assistant manager ahead of the 2026–27 campaign.

== Personal life ==
Way has two children with his wife Kelly.

On 17 December 2008, Way was involved in a serious accident on the A3088 Cartgate link road between the A303 and Yeovil whilst a passenger in a white van which collided head-on with a blue 4x4. He was airlifted to Dorchester Hospital, where his condition was described as serious but stable, before being treated at Frenchay Hospital in Bristol. His injuries included a broken left femur, broken left kneecap, broken and dislocated right elbow, broken and dislocated left hip, multiple fractures of his right wrist, damage to his right hand, a ruptured left biceps, deep cuts to both shins and soft tissue damage. Initially Way hoped that he would be able to resume his footballing career. On 22 January 2009, Way was discharged from Yeovil District Hospital, after having thirteen operations, marking a huge step on his road to recovery, although he was still using a wheelchair. During half-time in Terry Skiverton's first match in charge against Oldham Athletic, on 21 February 2009, Way came on the pitch in his wheelchair and did a lap of honour. Way had to learn how to walk again after his accident, and after his retirement he and stadium technician Bruce James were involved in a lengthy legal battle in the High Court with the insurers of the 4x4 driver over compensation for the accident.

== Career statistics ==
=== Player ===
Appearances and goals by club, season and competition
Club	Season	League			FA Cup		League Cup		Other		Total	
Club	Season	Division	Apps	Goals	Apps	Goals	Apps	Goals	Apps	Goals	Apps	Goals
Yeovil Town	2000–01	Football Conference	41	9	5	1	—		5 (Note: Three appearances and one goal in FA Trophy, two appearances and one goal in Conference League Cup)	2	51	12
Yeovil Town	2001–02	Football Conference	27	3	0	0	—		7 (Note: Six appearances in FA Trophy, one appearance in Football League Trophy)	0	34	3
Yeovil Town	2002–03	Football Conference	40	1	3	0	—		5 (Note: Four appearances in FA Trophy, one appearance in Football League Trophy)	0	48	1
Yeovil Town	2003–04	Third Division	39	5	2	0	1	0	2 (Note: Appearances in Football League Trophy)	0	44	5
Yeovil Town	2004–05	League Two	45	7	5	2	2	0	0	0	52	9
Yeovil Town	2005–06	League One	15	1	1	1	2	1	0	0	18	3
Yeovil Town (loan)	2007–08	League One	8	1	0	0	0	0	0	0	8	1
Yeovil Town	2008–09	League One	15	2	1	0	2	0	1	0	19	2
Yeovil Town	Total		230	29	17	4	7	1	20	2	274	36
Swansea City	2005–06	League One	5	0	0	0	0	0	3	0	8	0
Swansea City	2006–07	League One	9	0	0	0	0	0	0	0	9	0
Swansea City	2007–08	League One	2	0	0	0	0	0	2	0	4	0
Swansea City	Total		16	0	0	0	0	0	5	0	21	0
Career totals			246	29	17	4	7	1	25	2	295	36

=== Managerial ===
As of match played 21 March 2026

Managerial record by team and tenure
Team	From	To	Record				
Team	From	To	P	W	D	L	Win %
Yeovil Town	1 December 2015	24 March 2019	189	56	56	77	29.6
Bath City	23 December 2024	22 March 2026	68	19	22	27	27.9
Total			257	75	78	104	29.2

== Honours ==
=== Player ===
Yeovil Town

- Football League Two: 2004–05
- Football Conference: 2002–03
- FA Trophy: 2001–02

England National Game XI

- Four Nations Tournament: 2003

Individual

- Football Conference Team of the Year: 2000–01, 2002–03
- PFA Team of the Year: 2004–05 League Two
