= Errington Kelly =

British-Vincentian footballer (born 1858)

Personal information
- Full name: Errington Edison Kelly
- Date of birth: 8 April 1958 (age 68)
- Place of birth: Saint Vincent and the Grenadines
- Height: 5 ft 8 in (1.73 m)
- Positions: Winger; striker

Senior career*
Years	Team	Apps	(Gls)
- Ledbury Town
1981–1983	Bristol Rovers	18	(3)
1983	Lincoln City	2	(0)
1983	Bristol City	5	(1)
1983	Coventry City	0	(0)
1984–1986,1987–1988	Peterborough United	118	(28)
1986,1988	Grebbestads IF	20	(8)
1989	Gimonäs CK		
Total		143	(32)
- * Club domestic league appearances and goals

Errington Edison Kelly (born 8 April 1958) is a former footballer who played in the Football League for Bristol Rovers, Bristol City, Lincoln City, and Peterborough United in England. He had more than 100 appearances during his five seasons at Peterborough United, and later played in Sweden for Grebbestads IF and Gimonäs CK.

== Early life and career ==
Kelly was born on the island of Saint Vincent, and moved to Coventry as a young boy. His younger brother Tony also became a football player.

Early in his career, he joined AP Leamington and played for VS Rugby for one season. He briefly joined Ledbury Town in the summer of 1981, but transferred a month later to Bristol Rovers for £1,000.

== Career ==
In September 1981, Kelly was signed by manager Terry Cooper at Bristol Rovers, shortly before Bobby Gould took over as manager. His first League appearance was in February 1982, during the Rovers' 3–2 win against Exeter City.

He briefly moved to Lincoln City in January 1983, and joined Terry Cooper and his brother Tony Kelly at Bristol City two months later.

In July 1983, he linked up with Gould again at First Division Coventry City. Initially joining Coventry with a three-month contract, the deal was extended for two months after Kelly scored four goals in six games for the reserve team. Although Kelly appeared in a couple of pre-season friendlies, he did not break through to the first team.

Kelly moved to Peterborough United on loan in March 1984. After netting seven goals in 11 appearances, Kelly was made permanent. Over five seasons with Peterborough, Kelly made more than 100 appearances. He was once considered "Peterborough's only skilful player", the team's "leading marksman in 1984–1985", and "on his day, the division's most dangerous striker".

Although he was popular with Peterborough fans, over time he developed a public love-hate relationship with manager John Wile, and was disciplined on multiple occasions. By 1986, the Peterborough Standard referred to Kelly as "the exciting but controversial striker", and lamented that he was "unfortunately, very inconsistent". In May 1986, Kelly was released on a free transfer, along with five other players.

During the 1986 Swedish football season, Kelly played for Grebbestads IF in the Third Division, and won the team award for top goalscorer, with six goals. By January 1987, he had returned to England to play for Peterborough United, signing a one-year contract in June of that year, but struggled with injuries.

Kelly left for Sweden once again in April 1988 to play for Grebbestads IF, and moved to Gimonas the following season. He later returned to England and became a football coach and English teacher.
