= Henri Camara =

Senegalese footballer (born 1977)

Personal information
- Full name: Henri Camara
- Date of birth: 10 May 1977 (age 49)
- Place of birth: Dakar, Senegal
- Height: 1.76 m (5 ft 9 in)
- Position: Striker

Youth career
- ASC Diaraf

Senior career*
| Years | Team | Apps | (Gls) |
| 1998–1999 | Strasbourg | 0 | (0) |
| 1999–2000 | Neuchâtel Xamax | 32 | (17) |
| 2000–2001 | Grasshoppers | 11 | (3) |
| 2001–2003 | Sedan | 59 | (22) |
| 2003–2005 | Wolverhampton Wanderers | 30 | (7) |
| 2004–2005 | → Celtic (loan) | 18 | (8) |
| 2005 | → Southampton (loan) | 13 | (4) |
| 2005–2009 | Wigan Athletic | 69 | (20) |
| 2007–2008 | → West Ham United (loan) | 10 | (0) |
| 2009 | → Stoke City (loan) | 4 | (0) |
| 2009–2010 | Sheffield United | 23 | (4) |
| 2010–2011 | Atromitos | 28 | (3) |
| 2011–2014 | Panetolikos | 102 | (29) |
| 2014–2015 | AEL Kalloni | 13 | (1) |
| 2015 | Lamia | 9 | (1) |
| 2015–2016 | Panetolikos | 5 | (0) |
| 2016 | Apollon Smyrnis | 13 | (6) |
| 2016–2017 | Ionikos | 23 | (10) |
| 2017–2018 | Fostiras | 2 | (0) |
| Total | | 464 | (135) |

International career
| 1999–2008 | Senegal | 99 | (29) |
- * Club domestic league appearances and goals

Henri Camara (born 10 May 1977) is a Senegalese former professional footballer who played as a striker. Starting his career in the late 1990s, he went on to play professionally in France, Switzerland, Scotland, England, and Greece before retiring in 2018. A full international between 1999 and 2008, he won 99 caps for the Senegal national team and scored 29 goals. He represented his nation at the 2002 FIFA World Cup, where he scored two goals as Senegal reached the quarter-finals.

== Club career ==
=== Early career ===
Camara was born in Dakar, Senegal, to a Guinean father and a Senegalese mother. He began his career at local club ASC Jaraaf, and joined French club Racing Club de Strasbourg Alsace (1998–1999), before playing for Swiss clubs Neuchâtel Xamax (1999–2000), and Grasshopper Club Zürich, where he won the Swiss Championship in 2001. He then returned to France with Sedan but sought a new move when they were relegated in 2003.

=== Wolverhampton Wanderers ===
Camara joined newly promoted English Premier League club Wolverhampton Wanderers in August 2003 in a four-year deal for £1.5 million. He was a regular first-choice player, capable of creating goalscoring opportunities, but often guilty of erratic finishing that left him with just one goal from 23 games, this goal being the crucial winner as Wolves came back from 3 down at half time to beat relegation rivals Leicester City 4–3. Towards the end of the season, he found his scoring touch and struck 6 times in the final 9 games. While this could not prevent relegation, he was named the fans' Player of the Year.

However, Camara was unwilling to play at a lower level and did not turn up for pre-season training. His future was further unsettled by a bid from Phil Gartside, Bolton Wanderers' chairman, which Wolves chief executive Jez Moxey rejected. He eventually returned to the club but only to negotiate a loan move away.

==== Celtic and Southampton loans ====
Camara's route out of Wolves came in the form of Celtic, who paid £1.5 million to take him on loan for the 2004–05 season. His time in Scotland was disappointing, though, as he scored eight goals from twelve starts and six substitute appearances. Camara claimed in the press that he would replace Henrik Larsson, who had just left the club. He also requested Larsson's squad number (7) which he had had at a previous club as well, but was instead given number 27.

The loan deal was terminated during the January 2005 transfer window despite being contracted for longer, as he moved back to England with Southampton. Here, he suffered relegation again as the Saints made the drop on the final day of the season.

=== Wigan Athletic ===
Camara finally found a new permanent club when he was signed by Premiership newcomers Wigan Athletic in August 2005 in a three-year deal for £3 million. In 2006, his contract was extended to 2009 due to his outstanding goal scoring form. He had a great time playing with Jason Roberts as they linked well. He again found himself in a Premier League relegation battle, but it ended third time lucky for him as Wigan made a last day escape at the expense of Sheffield United.

After Wigan manager Paul Jewell's resignation, Camara found himself out of favour at Wigan and he was loaned out to West Ham United, for the duration of the 2007–08 season, at the end of the Summer transfer window. By his own admission, he has had a torrid time at West Ham and wants to preferably find another club in England. Despite allowing him to leave on loan Steve Bruce suggested that if Camara wanted to stay at Wigan he was more than welcome to.

Camara scored a brace in his first game back for Wigan under Bruce in the 4–0 win in the League Cup over Notts County. He then scored the match winner against Everton in a 1–0 victory for Wigan at the JJB Stadium on 24 November 2008, their first win against Everton on home soil. He scored again against West Bromwich Albion the following match. Whilst at Wigan he started in the 2006 Football League Cup Final.

On 2 February 2009, Camara joined Stoke City on loan until the end of the season in search of regular first-team football. He missed a glaring opportunity straight after coming off the bench for his debut at Sunderland, smashing a volley from 6 yards against the bar with the entire goal to aim for. He was released by Wigan at the end of the 2008–09 season, after not being offered a new contract.

Camara spent much of the 2009 close-season on trial at Premier League club Hull City but was not offered a contract.

=== Sheffield United ===
After initially rejecting a deal with the Blades, Camara signed a short-term agreement with the Sheffield club until the end of the season. Camara made his début in a 4–3 loss to Cardiff City at the end of October and scored his first goal for the club in a 1–0 win over Peterborough United a month later. He made 23 appearances that season, often from the bench, and scored four goals but was released when his contract expired as the club sought to cut the wage bill.

=== Atromitos ===
On 11 May 2010, Camara signed a one-year deal with Super League Greece side Atromitos.

=== Panetolikos ===
On 19 June 2011, Camara signed a one-year deal with Super League side Panetolikos. Despite appearing in all 30 league games and being Panetolikos' top scorer for the season with 7 goals, he couldn't help his team avoid relegation.

Camara signed another one-year deal with Panetolikos on 27 August 2012, and, by scoring 10 goals in the regular season and 3 goals in the playoffs, helped the team return to the Greek Super League after only one year at the Greek Football League.

In the summer of 2013, he signed a third one-year deal with Panetolikos.

=== AEL Kalloni ===
On 12 May 2014, Camara signed a year deal with AEL Kalloni, for an undisclosed fee. He resigned on 1 February 2015.

=== Lamia ===
On 2 February 2015, Lamia announced the signing of the player for the rest of the season.

=== Panetolikos ===
On 18 August 2015, Camara returned to Panetolikos F.C., signing a one-year contract. On 18 January 2016 Camara and Panetolikos parted ways. Having received an offer from Apollon Smyrnis, Camara asked for his contract with Panetolikos to be terminated, in an attempt to get more playing time and reach 100 Senegal caps.

=== Apollon ===
On 19 January 2016, Camara joined Apollon Smyrni.

He spent the 2017–18 season at Greek third-tier side Fostiras. He retired from football in August 2018 at the age of 41.

== International career ==
Camara made his international debut for Senegal in a 1–1 African Cup of Nations qualifier against Nigeria on 28 February 1999. He went on to play in their surprising run at the 2002 World Cup, scoring two goals, including a golden goal, in the Round of 16 against Sweden, which took them to the quarter-finals for the first time in their history. He was also part of the 2000, 2002, 2004, 2006 and 2008 Africa Cup of Nations squads.

Camara also featured in Ronaldinho's squad for a charity football match. The match was between Europe and the rest of the world. Camara came on as a substitute and scored 2 goals in the second half of the game to help his team take the victory.

Internationally, Camara could have played for Guinea as his father was born in Guinea. On choosing Senegal, he explained, "I was born in Senegal but my father is from Guinea, so, yes, I could have played with Momo Sylla in the Guinea national team. When I was young, I received an invitation from the Senegal youth team and my dad didn't want me to play. His dream was for me to play for Guinea. But I didn't know Guinea very well. Senegal was my country, so it was an easy decision for me to make."

== Career statistics ==
=== Club ===
Appearances and goals by club, season and competition
| Club | Season | League | | | National cup (Note: Includes Coupe de France, FA Cup, Scottish Cup, Greek Football Cup) | | League cup (Note: Includes Coupe de la Ligue, Football League Cup, Scottish League Cup) | | Europe | | Total | |
| Club | Season | Division | Apps | Goals | Apps | Goals | Apps | Goals | Apps | Goals | Apps | Goals |
|---|---|---|---|---|---|---|---|---|---|---|---|---|
| Strasbourg | 1998–99 | Division 1 | 0 | 0 | 0 | 0 | 0 | 0 | – | | 0 | 0 |
| Neuchâtel Xamax | 1999–2000 | Swiss Nationalliga A | 32 | 17 | 0 | 0 | – | | – | | 32 | 17 |
| Grasshopper Club Zürich | 2000–01 | Swiss Nationalliga A | 11 | 3 | 0 | 0 | – | | – | | 11 | 3 |
| Sedan | 2001–02 | Division 1 | 25 | 8 | 3 | 0 | 0 | 0 | 2 (Note: Appearances in UEFA Cup) | 0 | 30 | 8 |
| Sedan | 2002–03 | Ligue 1 | 34 | 14 | 0 | 0 | 1 | 1 | – | | 35 | 15 |
| Sedan | Total | | 59 | 22 | 3 | 0 | 1 | 1 | 2 | 0 | 65 | 23 |
| Wolverhampton Wanderers | 2003–04 | Premier League | 30 | 7 | 0 | 0 | 2 | 0 | – | | 32 | 7 |
| Wolverhampton Wanderers | 2004–05 | Championship | 0 | 0 | 0 | 0 | 0 | 0 | – | | 0 | 0 |
| Wolverhampton Wanderers | Total | | 30 | 7 | 0 | 0 | 2 | 0 | – | | 32 | 7 |
| Celtic (loan) | 2004–05 | Scottish Premier League | 18 | 8 | 1 | 0 | 1 | 0 | 6 (Note: Appearances in UEFA Champions League) | 0 | 26 | 8 |
| Southampton (loan) | 2004–05 | Premier League | 13 | 4 | 3 | 2 | 0 | 0 | – | | 16 | 6 |
| Wigan Athletic | 2005–06 | Premier League | 29 | 12 | 0 | 0 | 3 | 0 | – | | 32 | 12 |
| Wigan Athletic | 2006–07 | Premier League | 23 | 6 | 0 | 0 | 0 | 0 | – | | 23 | 6 |
| Wigan Athletic | 2007–08 | Premier League | 0 | 0 | 0 | 0 | 1 | 0 | – | | 1 | 0 |
| Wigan Athletic | 2008–09 | Premier League | 17 | 2 | 1 | 1 | 3 | 3 | – | | 21 | 6 |
| Wigan Athletic | Total | | 69 | 20 | 1 | 1 | 7 | 3 | – | | 77 | 24 |
| West Ham United (loan) | 2007–08 | Premier League | 10 | 0 | 0 | 0 | 0 | 0 | – | | 10 | 0 |
| Stoke City (loan) | 2008–09 | Premier League | 4 | 0 | 0 | 0 | 0 | 0 | – | | 4 | 0 |
| Sheffield United | 2009–10 | Championship | 23 | 4 | 2 | 0 | 0 | 0 | – | | 25 | 4 |
| Atromitos | 2010–11 | Super League Greece | 28 | 3 | 7 | 1 | – | | – | | 35 | 4 |
| Panetolikos | 2011–12 | Super League Greece | 30 | 7 | 2 | 0 | – | | – | | 32 | 7 |
| Panetolikos | 2012–13 | Football League Greece | 40 | 13 | 1 | 0 | – | | – | | 41 | 13 |
| Panetolikos | 2013–14 | Super League Greece | 32 | 9 | 2 | 0 | – | | – | | 34 | 9 |
| Panetolikos | Total | | 102 | 29 | 5 | 0 | – | | – | | 107 | 29 |
| AEL Kalloni | 2014–15 | Super League Greece | 13 | 1 | 2 | 2 | – | | – | | 15 | 3 |
| Lamia | 2014–15 | Football League Greece | 9 | 1 | 0 | 0 | – | | – | | 9 | 1 |
| Lamia | Total | | 9 | 1 | 0 | 0 | – | | – | | 9 | 1 |
| Panetolikos | 2015–16 | Super League Greece | 5 | 0 | 2 | 0 | – | | – | | 7 | 0 |
| Apollon Smyrnis | 2015–16 | Football League Greece | 13 | 6 | 0 | 0 | – | | – | | 13 | 6 |
| Ionikos | 2016–17 | Gamma Ethniki | 23 | 10 | 0 | 0 | – | | – | | 23 | 10 |
| Fostiras | 2017–18 | Gamma Ethniki | 2 | 0 | 0 | 0 | – | | – | | 2 | 0 |
| Career total | | | 491 | 135 | 26 | 6 | 10 | 4 | 8 | 0 | 533 | 145 |

=== International ===
Appearances and goals by national team and year
| National team | Year | Apps | Goals |
|---|---|---|---|
| Senegal | 1999 | 11 | 2 |
| Senegal | 2000 | 13 | 2 |
| Senegal | 2001 | 10 | 3 |
| Senegal | 2002 | 13 | 3 |
| Senegal | 2003 | 7 | 3 |
| Senegal | 2004 | 13 | 4 |
| Senegal | 2005 | 7 | 4 |
| Senegal | 2006 | 9 | 2 |
| Senegal | 2007 | 4 | 3 |
| Senegal | 2008 | 12 | 3 |
| Total | | 99 | 29 |

Scores and results list Senegal's goal tally first, score column indicates score after each Camara goal.

List of international goals scored by Henri Camara
| No. | Date | Venue | Opponent | Score | Result | Competition |
|---|---|---|---|---|---|---|
| 1 | 6 June 1999 | Stade du 4-Août, Ouagadougou, Burkina Faso | Burkina Faso | 1–0 | 2–2 | 1999 African Cup of Nations qualification |
| 2 | 20 August 1999 | Cicero Stadium, Asmara, Eritrea | Eritrea | 1–0 | 2–0 | 2000 African Cup of Nations qualification |
| 3 | 25 January 2000 | Sani Abacha Stadium, Kano, Nigeria | Burkina Faso | 1–0 | 3–1 | 2000 African Cup of Nations |
| 4 | 1 February 2000 | National Stadium, Lagos, Nigeria | Zambia | 1–0 | 2–2 | 2000 African Cup of Nations |
| 5 | 10 March 2001 | Stade Leopold Senghor, Dakar, Senegal | Namibia | 4–0 | 4–0 | 2002 FIFA World Cup qualification |
| 6 | 24 March 2001 | Stade Leopold Senghor, Dakar, Senegal | Uganda | 2–0 | 2–0 | 2002 African Cup of Nations qualification |
| 7 | 30 December 2001 | Stade Leopold Senghor, Dakar, Senegal | Algeria | 1–0 | 1–0 | Friendly |
| 8 | 16 June 2002 | Ōita Bank Dome, Ōita, Japan | Sweden | 1–1 | 2–1 | 2002 FIFA World Cup |
| 9 | 16 June 2002 | Ōita Bank Dome, Ōita, Japan | Sweden | 2–1 | 2–1 | 2002 FIFA World Cup |
| 10 | 8 September 2002 | Setsoso Stadium, Maseru, Lesotho | Lesotho | 1–0 | 1–0 | 2004 African Cup of Nations qualification |
| 11 | 7 June 2003 | Stade Leopold Senghor, Dakar, Senegal | Gambia | 2–0 | 3–1 | 2004 African Cup of Nations qualification |
| 12 | 14 June 2003 | Stade Leopold Senghor, Dakar, Senegal | Lesotho | 2–0 | 3–0 | 2004 African Cup of Nations qualification |
| 13 | 14 June 2003 | Stade Leopold Senghor, Dakar, Senegal | Lesotho | 3–0 | 3–0 | 2004 African Cup of Nations qualification |
| 14 | 18 August 2004 | Stade Pierre de Coubertin, Avignon, France | Ivory Coast | 1–0 | 1–2 | Friendly |
| 15 | 5 September 2004 | Stade 26 mars, Bamako, Mali | Mali | 1–1 | 2–2 | 2006 FIFA World Cup qualification |
| 16 | 10 October 2004 | National Complex, Paynesville, Liberia | Liberia | 2–0 | 3–0 | 2006 FIFA World Cup qualification |
| 17 | 10 October 2004 | National Complex, Paynesville, Liberia | Liberia | 3–0 | 3–0 | 2006 FIFA World Cup qualification |
| 18 | 26 March 2005 | Stade Leopold Senghor, Dakar, Senegal | Liberia | 4–0 | 6–1 | 2006 FIFA World Cup qualification |
| 19 | 18 June 2005 | Stade Leopold Senghor, Dakar, Senegal | Togo | 2–1 | 2–2 | 2006 FIFA World Cup qualification |
| 20 | 8 October 2005 | Stade Leopold Senghor, Dakar, Senegal | Mali | 1–0 | 3–0 | 2006 FIFA World Cup qualification |
| 21 | 8 October 2005 | Stade Leopold Senghor, Dakar, Senegal | Mali | 3–0 | 3–0 | 2006 FIFA World Cup qualification |
| 22 | 23 January 2006 | Port Said Stadium, Port Said, Egypt | Zimbabwe | 1–0 | 2–0 | 2006 Africa Cup of Nations |
| 23 | 3 February 2006 | Harras El-Hedoud Stadium, Alexandria, Egypt | Guinea | 3–1 | 3–2 | 2006 Africa Cup of Nations |
| 24 | 8 September 2007 | Stade Leopold Senghor, Dakar, Senegal | Burkina Faso | 3–1 | 5–1 | 2008 Africa Cup of Nations qualification |
| 25 | 8 September 2007 | Stade Leopold Senghor, Dakar, Senegal | Burkina Faso | 4–1 | 5–1 | 2008 Africa Cup of Nations qualification |
| 26 | 17 November 2007 | Stade Olympique Yves-du-Manoir, Colombes, France | Mali | 1–0 | 3–2 | Friendly |
| 27 | 12 January 2008 | Stade Leopold Senghor, Dakar, Senegal | Namibia | 3–1 | 3–1 | Friendly |
| 28 | 31 January 2008 | Baba Yara Stadium, Kumasi, Nigeria | South Africa | 1–1 | 1–1 | 2008 Africa Cup of Nations |
| 29 | 21 June 2008 | Stade Leopold Senghor, Dakar, Senegal | Liberia | 3–0 | 3–1 | 2010 FIFA World Cup qualification |

== Honours ==
Wigan Athletic

- Football League Cup runner-up: 2005–06
