= Tony Kelly (footballer, born 1966) =

English footballer

Personal information
- Full name: Nyrere Anthony Okpara Kelly
- Date of birth: 14 February 1966 (age 60)
- Place of birth: Coventry, England
- Position: Winger

Youth career
- 1980–1982: Bristol City

Senior career*
Years	Team	Apps	(Gls)
1982–1983	Bristol City	6	(1)
1983	Nuneaton Borough		
1983–1985	Stratford Town		
1985–1986	Dulwich Hamlet		
1987	Corinthian-Casuals		
1987–1988	Cheshunt		
1988	Enfield Town		
1988–1990	St Albans City		
1989	→ Gimonäs CK (loan)		
1990–1993	Stoke City	58	(5)
1991–1992	→ Hull City (loan)	6	(1)
1992–1993	→ Cardiff City (loan)	5	(1)
1993–1995	Bury	56	(10)
1995–1997	Leyton Orient	44	(4)
1996	→ Colchester United (loan)	3	(0)
1997	Falkirk	1	(0)
1997–1998	St Albans City		
1998–1999	Harlow Town		
Total		179	(22)
- * Club domestic league appearances and goals

Nyrere Anthony Okpara "Tony" Kelly (born 14 February 1966) is an English former footballer who played as a winger.

Kelly began his career with Bristol City but after failing to establish himself in the first team he entered non-league football. He played for Nuneaton Borough, Stratford Town, Dulwich Hamlet, Corinthian-Casuals, Cheshunt, Enfield Town, Gimonäs CK (Sweden) and St Albans City.

He joined Stoke City in January 1990 and at the Victoria Ground Kelly was never a regular but did play in the 1992 Football League Trophy Final victory over Stockport County. After loan spells at Hull City and Cardiff City he signed permanently with Bury and later played with Leyton Orient, Colchester United, Falkirk and made a return to St Albans City before ending his career at Harlow Town. Throughout his career Kelly struggled with a gambling addiction and ran up debts of over £300,000.

== Career ==
=== Early career ===
Kelly was born in Coventry and was one of seven children including his twin brother Mel. They both went to the same school in the Tile Hill area of the city before they moved to Coundon on the other side of the city. After playing football with the school team Kelly and his brother joined a Sunday League side, Coundon Cockerels managed by a Scotsman, Dave McLeod. Two of his other brothers were also involved with football, Abby who played in non-league and Errington who made it as a professional. He moved to Woodlands Secondary School and his PE teacher recommended him to play for the Coventry schoolboys. At high school Kelly had to deal with racist abuse and often got into fights. Kelly became friends with boxer Errol Christie which made going to nightclubs easier.

One day his brother Errington, who was playing for Bristol Rovers set him and Mel up with a trial. The pair travelled with Errington to Bristol where they met the Rovers manager Bobby Gould and after a couple of training sessions they played in a South East Counties League match against West Ham United. However it was not enough for them to be offered a contract by Bristol Rovers. Errington then asked his former manager Terry Cooper who was now at Bristol City if they could have a trial and he accepted. They both played and scored in a trial match against Mangotsfield United which saw them both successfully offered a YTS at the club. After meeting with the rest of the squad they moved into a lodgings paid by the club to accommodate youth team players and he was informed that his behaviour would be closely monitored.

Kelly began to impress the coaches at Ashton Gate and he began to train with the first team and on 16 October 1982 he was named in the squad for a league match away at Hartlepool United. He came on as a second-half substitute in a 1–1 draw and at the age of 16 years and 244 days he became Bristol City's youngest player. His record remained until it was broken by Marvin Brown in 1999. Kelly then played against Sheffield Wednesday at Hillsborough in the League Cup in a narrow 2–1 defeat. His brother Mel was struggling to make an impact and was released by the club in November 1982. It was at this time Kelly began to 'get too big for his boots' and began to show a poor attitude which did not go unnoticed by the management who sent him back to the youth team. He earned a recall to the first team against Hereford United on 28 December 1982 where he scored his first league goal in a 3–1 victory. However, by 1983 he was not being asked to play and in May 1983 he was informed by Terry Cooper he was being released because of his "rubbish attitude" and so Kelly returned to his family in Coventry.

=== Non-league football ===
After returning to Coventry, Kelly contacted local non-league sides Nuneaton Borough and Bedworth United in the hope of getting the chance to play football again and after a short trial he joined Nuneaton Borough. Under the management of Graham Carr Nuneaton played in the Alliance Premier League and it was hard for Kelly to establish himself in the first team and when Carr could not offer Kelly a long-term contract he wanted he parted amicably for Stratford Town. At Stratford was his brother Abby and together they played in the Midland Combination League whilst he also worked as a banqueting porter at the Hotel Leofric. In the summer of 1983 Kelly began to visit his brother, Mel who had moved to London and was now playing for Dulwich Hamlet. After starting the 1984–85 season with Stratford Kelly moved to London in March 1985 and got a job as a security guard in Dulwich.

He also began playing for Dulwich Hamlet whose first-team included Alan Pardew, Andy Gray and Paul Harding but Mel soon left for Corinthian-Casuals. It was at this time Kelly began to get involved with gambling and would soon become an addiction. In January 1987 he moved in with his sister, Pat in Enfield and signed for Corinthian-Casuals. On his 21st birthday Kelly was playing in an away match where he was sent-off for two bookable offences and in rage Kelly pushed the referee to the ground. Kelly was given a nine-month ban by the FA and he left Corinthian-Casuals and also decided to change his name from Nyrere to Tony.

He began playing with Cheshunt where he finished the 1987–88 season as top-scorer and also changed his name again this time to Nyrere Anthony Okpara Kelly. He then had a brief spell with Enfield Town before joining St Albans City. By now his brother Errington had moved to Sweden to play for Grebbestads IF and after Kelly went over to visit him he began writing to Swedish clubs's offering them his services. To his surprise St Albans received a loan offer from Swedish Second Division side Gimonäs CK which Kelly quickly accepted.

Gimonäs is based in the city of Umeå and Kelly travelled there with the intentions of attracting the attentions of top-flight Swedish teams and teams back in England. Errington also managed to make the move to Gimonäs and the club under the management of Anders Johansson had ambitions to aim for promotion to the Allsvenskan. However results were inconsistent and they ended the season in 6th position. With his loan spell coming to an end St Albans decided against extended it and so Kelly returned to England in November 1989. On his return to London, Kelly resumed his job at Eastern Electricity and also continued to go to betting shops and play for St Albans City.

His time in Sweden had alerted other clubs to his talents and he earned a trial at Southampton. He had two training sessions with the Saints squad and played in a reserve match against Oxford United and whilst Kelly impressed the manager Chris Nicholl he could not justify paying the £100,000 St Albans wanted so Kelly returned to the club to have words with chairman Bernard Tominey. St Albans refused to lower their demands but decided they would accept £40,000 from a club not in the First Division. Kelly then played a trial match for Watford but picked up an injury which scuppered any move. He was then told Stoke City were interested and that their manager Alan Ball would be attending their next match against Stevenage. Assistant manager Graham Paddon contacted Kelly the next day offering him a trial but Kelly refused and stated he wants a contract. Ball soon rang back and offered him a two-and-a-half-year deal for a fee of £20,000 which St Albans accepted.

=== Stoke City ===
Kelly joined Stoke in January 1990 with the team struggling at the foot of the Second Division. After he moved to Stoke-on-Trent from London he was shown around the Victoria Ground and was given free accommodation at a local hotel and he was also given a £10,000 signing on fee but he spent most of it gambling. He made his debut for Stoke in the Potteries derby against Port Vale on 3 February 1990 where he played 70 minutes in a goalless draw at Vale Park. In all he made nine appearances in 1989–90 as Stoke dropped into the Third Division. In 1990–91 Kelly struggled to become a regular in the side under Alan Ball with most of his appearances coming off the substitute bench. Ball was sacked by Stoke in February 1991 and was replaced by Lou Macari in June 1991.

Macari's intense fitness sessions worked well with Kelly who made his biggest contribution in a Stoke shirt on 25 September 1991 when he scored a late equaliser in a 2–2 draw with Liverpool in the League Cup at Anfield. However his joy soon turned to despair as in the second leg a Kelly backpass was intercepted by Ian Rush and Liverpool went on to win 3–2. Stoke pushed for promotion in 1991–92 and they reached the play-offs where they lost to Stockport County. Three days later the two sides met again this time in the Football League Trophy final at Wembley Stadium a Mark Stein goal earning Stoke a 1–0 win. He played nine times in 1992–93 as Stoke won the Second Division title. His gambling addiction caused him to lose his form and after failing to play in 1993–94 Macari decided to move Kelly on. Whilst out of the side he spent time out on loan at Hull City (making six appearances scoring once) and Cardiff City (making five appearances scoring once).

=== Later career ===
Kelly joined Bury in September 1993 playing 37 times in 1993–94 scoring eight goals and then helped the "Shakers" reach the Third Division play-offs in 1995 losing 2–0 to Chesterfield in the final. He then signed for Leyton Orient for a fee of £40,000 and he played in 38 matches in 1995–96 as the Os finished in 21st position. In 1996–97 he fell out with manager Pat Holland and was sent out on loan to Colchester United for whom he made three appearances. On his return to Brisbane Road Kelly turned down the chance to go on loan to Watford and went on to play 11 times for Orient in 1996–97.

With his gambling debts now up to £300,000 Kelly decided to retire from football but he postponed it to play in Scotland with Falkirk. However, after just one appearance he quickly returned to London and signed a two-year deal with St Albans. Whilst at St Albans he worked as a part-time agent with Mel and helped his cousin Leon earn a professional contract at Cambridge United. Kelly ended his career with an 18-month spell at Harlow Town before retiring and later went to work for Network Rail.

== Personal life ==
Kelly suffered with a severe gambling addiction during his career, and lost £300,000 in nine years. He wrote a book, largely about his addiction and his career, entitled Red Card in 2013. His brother Errington was also a professional footballer.

== Career statistics ==
Sourced from Tony Kelly at the English National Football Archive (subscription required)

Club	Season	League			FA Cup		League Cup		Other^{[A]}		Total	
Club	Season	Division	Apps	Goals	Apps	Goals	Apps	Goals	Apps	Goals	Apps	Goals
Bristol City	1982–83	Fourth Division	6	1	0	0	1	0	0	0	7	1
Stoke City	1989–90	Second Division	9	0	0	0	0	0	0	0	9	0
Stoke City	1990–91	Third Division	29	3	0	0	3	1	1	0	33	4
Stoke City	1991–92	Third Division	13	2	0	0	4	2	4	0	21	4
Stoke City	1992–93	Second Division	7	0	0	0	2	0	0	0	9	0
Stoke City	1993–94	First Division	0	0	0	0	0	0	1	0	1	0
Stoke City	Total		58	5	0	0	9	3	6	0	73	8
Hull City (loan)	1991–92	Third Division	6	1	0	0	0	0	0	0	6	1
Cardiff City (loan)	1992–93	Third Division	5	1	0	0	0	0	0	0	5	1
Bury	1993–94	Third Division	34	7	0	0	0	0	3	1	37	8
Bury	1994–95	Third Division	22	3	2	0	1	0	3	2	28	5
Bury	Total		56	10	2	0	1	0	6	3	65	13
Leyton Orient	1995–96	Third Division	34	3	1	0	1	0	2	0	38	3
Leyton Orient	1996–97	Third Division	10	1	0	0	1	0	0	0	11	1
Leyton Orient	Total		44	4	1	0	2	0	2	0	49	4
Colchester United (loan)	1996–97	Third Division	3	0	0	0	0	0	0	0	3	0
Career Total			178	22	3	0	13	3	14	3	208	28

A. The "Other" column constitutes appearances and goals in the Anglo-Italian Cup, Football League play-offs and Football League Trophy.

== Honours ==
Stoke City

- Football League Second Division: 1992–93
- Associate Members' Cup: 1991–92
