= Jamie Gosling =

English footballer

Personal information
- Full name: Jamie John Gosling
- Date of birth: 21 March 1982 (age 44)
- Place of birth: Bath, Somerset, England
- Position: Midfielder

Youth career
- Bristol Rovers

Senior career*
Years	Team	Apps	(Gls)
–2000	Team Bath		
2000–2003	Bath City	56	(9)
2003–2004	Yeovil Town	13	(1)
2004	Aldershot Town	8	(1)
2004	Team Bath	5	(0)
2004	Weymouth	0	(0)
2004–2005	Torquay United	7	(1)
2005	Woking	8	(0)
2005–2006	Forest Green Rovers	9	(0)
2006–2008	Hungerford Town		
2008	Bath City		
2009	R.R.F.C. Montegnée		
2012	Shepparton United	18	(18)
2012–2013	Manly United		
2013	Douglas United	15	(32)
2014–2017	FNQ Heat FC	53	(9)
2018	Stratford Dolphins	12	(1)
- * Club domestic league appearances and goals as of 11 February 2020

Jamie Gosling (born 21 March 1982) is an English former professional football midfielder. He previously played professionally in the Football League for Yeovil Town and Torquay United. He currently lives in Australia after setting up the Jamie Gosling Football Academy in Cairns, the largest junior football coaching academy in Far North Queensland.

== Club career ==
Gosling was on schoolboy terms with Bristol Rovers before joining Team Bath. He left in September 2000 to join local rivals Bath City. In April 2003 he had a trial with Cheltenham Town and in July 2003 joined Yeovil Town. He made his league debut on 9 August 2003 as Yeovil won 3–1 away to Rochdale, Yeovil's first ever game in the Football League. On 4 January 2004, while at Yeovil Town, Gosling came on as a 77th minute substitute in the televised FA Cup third round 2–0 home defeat against Liverpool at Huish Park.

Gosling joined Conference National side Aldershot Town on loan in March 2004, appearing in the 2004 Football Conference Play-off Final against Shrewsbury Town in front of a crowd of 19,216 at the Britannia Stadium in Stoke. Gosling had trials with Chester City, Boston United and Hereford United during the 2004 close-season, before returning to Team Bath on a short-term contract in August 2004.

He joined Weymouth that November, but played just once, in the FA Trophy, before joining Torquay United on a free transfer.

Gosling made his Torquay debut as a half-time substitute for Martin Phillips as Torquay lost 1–0 at home to Barnsley and started, and scored in, the 1–1 draw away to Chesterfield the following week. He lost his place after Torquay's 1–1 draw away to Huddersfield Town on 8 January 2005, a game in which Gosling was replaced early in the second half by Matthew Hockley, and was released in February 2005.

He joined Woking later that month and was a regular until the end of the season.

In August 2005 Gosling joined Forest Green Rovers, but was released in November 2005.

Gosling joined Hungerford Town in the 2006 close season, and he suffered a collapsed lung in March 2007 in a game against Shortwood United. In May 2007, his initial one-year contract with Hungerford was extended by a further year. At Hungerford, Gosling played with future England striker Charlie Austin.

He rejoined Bath City in June 2008 but left again in November 2008 rejoining former club Hungerford Town. In 2009, Gosling moved to Belgium for a short period, playing at RRFC Montegnée.

== Move to Australia ==
In 2010, Gosling moved to Australia, and after spells at clubs in both Sydney and Melbourne, joined Douglas United in Far North Queensland in 2013, playing in the FNQ Premier League before signing with Far North Queensland FC in Cairns in 2014, where he played in the National Premier Leagues Queensland until 2017.

== Coaching career ==
In July 2015, Gosling announced the launch of the Jamie Gosling Football Academy, the largest football coaching academy in Cairns for boys and girls aged 2–16. Hi
