= Nathan Talbott =

English footballer

Personal information
- Date of birth: 21 October 1984 (age 42)
- Place of birth: Wolverhampton, England
- Position: Midfielder

Youth career
- Wolverhampton Wanderers

Senior career*
Years	Team	Apps	(Gls)
2003–2004	Wolverhampton Wanderers	0	(0)
2004	Yeovil Town	1	(0)
2004–20??	Stafford Rangers	43	(1)
- * Club domestic league appearances and goals as of 17:37, 9 February 2010 (UTC)

Nathan Talbott (born 21 October 1984) is an English professional football midfielder who last played for Stafford Rangers.

Talbott was born in Wolverhampton and began his career with Wolverhampton Wanderers, turning professional in July 2003. He failed to break into the first team at Molineux and left to join Yeovil Town on a free transfer in March 2004. He made his league debut for Yeovil, on 17 April 2004 as an injury-time substitute for Kevin Gall in the 2–1 home win against Bury. However, this was to be his only first team appearance for the Glovers.

He joined Stafford Rangers in August 2004 and was voted runner-up for the February 2005 Nationwide North Player of the Month award.

Since retiring from football, he has worked as a Partner at Wright Hassall LLP specialising in commercial litigation.
