= Lee Elam =

English footballer and manager (born 1976)

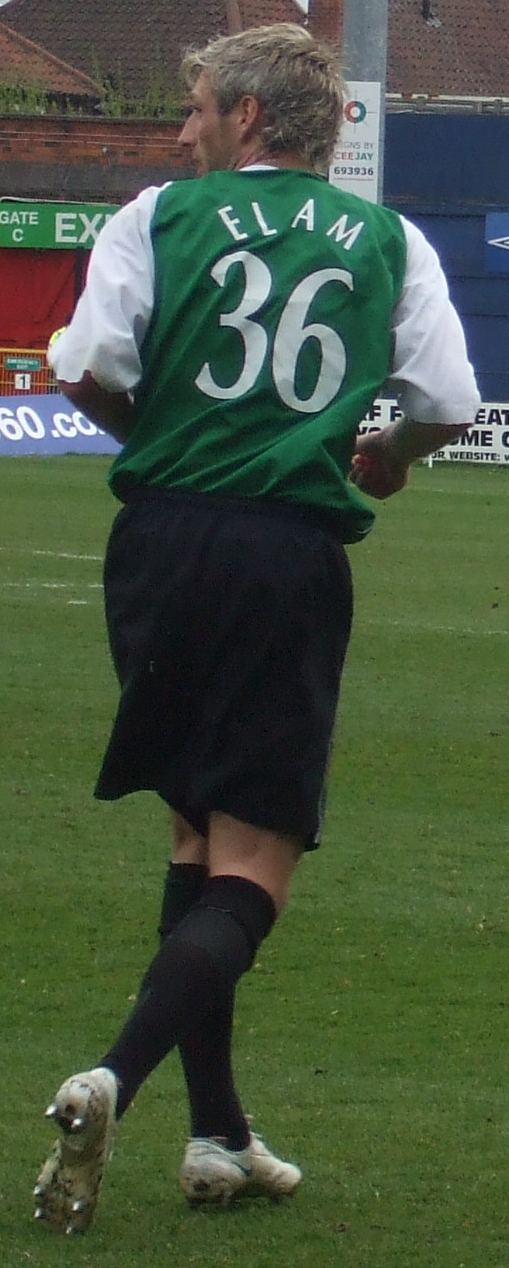
- Elam playing for Northwich Victoria in 2009

Personal information
- Full name: Lee Patrick George Elam
- Date of birth: 24 September 1976 (age 50)
- Place of birth: Bradford, England
- Position: Winger

Team information
- Current team: Albion Sports (manager)

Senior career*
Years	Team	Apps	(Gls)
1998–2002	Southport	104	(15)
2002–2003	Morecambe	40	(13)
2003	Halifax Town	15	(2)
2003–2004	Yeovil Town	12	(1)
2004	→ Chester City (loan)	4	(0)
2004	Hornchurch	13	(2)
2004	Burton Albion	1	(0)
2004–2005	Morecambe	23	(5)
2005	Crawley Town	5	(0)
2005–2007	Weymouth	23	(2)
2007–2008	Exeter City	40	(9)
2008–2009	Altrincham	21	(0)
2009–2010	Northwich Victoria	41	(0)
2010	Bradford Park Avenue	4	(1)
2010–2011	Stalybridge Celtic	29	(3)
2011–2013	Harrogate Town	45	(4)
2013	Bradford Park Avenue		
2013	Workington		
2013–????	Albion Sports		

International career
2002–2003	England Semi-Pro	4	(0)

Managerial career
- 2019–2022: Eccleshill United
- 2023–: Eccleshill United
- * Club domestic league appearances and goals

Lee Patrick George Elam (born 24 September 1976) is an English former professional footballer. He is manager of Albion Sports.

== Career ==
Elam was born in Bradford, West Yorkshire and began his footballing career in 1998 with Conference National side Southport. During his four years with the team, he played in 104 first team games in which he scored 15 goals.

After leaving Southport at the end of the 2001–02 season, Elam joined fellow Conference side Morecambe. During the 2002–03 season Elam made 40 appearances for the Shrimps, scoring 13 goals.

After only one season at Morecambe, Elam joined conference side Halifax Town for the beginning of the 2003–04 season. On 31 October 2003 after only 15 appearances for the Shaymen, Elam moved to League Two side Yeovil Town. Elam made only 12 appearances for the Glovers before moving on loan to then Conference side Chester City for the remainder of the 2003–04 season, acting as a bit-part player as the side sealed the Football Conference title.

At the beginning of the 2004–05 season, Elam signed with now defunct Conference South side Hornchurch. After only six months Elam signed with conference side Burton Albion on 5 November 2004. Elam made only one appearance during the month of November for the Brewers before moving back to Morecambe for the remainder of the season.

Elam began the 2005–06 season with Conference side Crawley Town where he made five appearances before moving on 27 September 2005 to Conference South side Weymouth. Weymouth finished the 2005–06 season as Conference South champions and were promoted to the Conference National.

Elam made 23 appearances for Weymouth during the 2006–07 season before the entire first team was transfer listed on 10 January 2007 after the club decided to cut their financial costs. He was picked up on a free transfer by neighbouring Conference side Exeter City on 15 January 2007. His first match for Exeter was against his former club Weymouth, in which he scored a hat-trick. He was released by the club in May 2008 and subsequently trained with York City in July. He played for York in a 1–1 draw against Leeds United in a pre-season friendly and earned the chance to play again against Middlesbrough. York manager Colin Walker was unable to offer Elam a contract, but failed to rule out signing him eventually. He later confirmed that Elam would not sign for the club. He eventually joined Altrincham on a part-time basis, where he would coach youngsters.

In January 2009, Elam requested to leave Altrincham and joined Northwich Victoria on non-contract terms. He made his debut in a 2–1 defeat to Histon.

In 2010, Elam left Northwich Victoria having made 41 appearances for the side, scoring no goals, and joined Stalybridge Celtic.

Elam's Stalybridge career, as with Northwich, lasted only one season; appearing 29 times and scoring three goals for the club, he moved on in summer 2011 to Harrogate Town, where he made his debut on 16 August 2011 in a 3–2 loss to Stalybridge at Bower Fold. In 2013 he had brief spells at Bradford Park Avenue and Workington, before signing for Albion Sports.

== Coaching career ==
After working worked as a youth coach at Bradford City, Elam he was appointed manager of Eccleshill United in May 2019. He resigned as Eccleshill manager in June 2022. He returned to the club as manager in May 2023.

== Career statistics ==
As of 21 January 2007.

Appearances and goals by club, season and competition
Club	Season	League		FA Cup		League Cup		Other		Total	
Club	Season	Apps	Goals	Apps	Goals	Apps	Goals	Apps	Goals	Apps	Goals
Southport	1998–02	82 (22)	15	1 (2)	0	-	-	4	0	87 (24)	15
Southport	All	82 (22)	15	1 (2)	0	-	-	4	0	87 (24)	15
Morecambe	2002–03	37 (3)	13	3	1	-	-	4	0	44 (3)	14
Morecambe	All	37 (3)	13	3	1	-	-	4	0	44 (3)	14
Halifax Town	2003	14 (1)	2	-	-	-	-	1	0	15 (1)	2
Halifax Town	All	14 (1)	2	-	-	-	-	1	0	15 (1)	2
Yeovil Town	2003–04	6 (6)	1	-	-	-	-	-	-	6 (6)	1
Yeovil Town	All	6 (6)	1	-	-	-	-	-	-	6 (6)	1
Chester City (loan)	2004	1 (3)	0	-	-	-	-	-	-	1 (3)	0
Chester City (loan)	All	1 (3)	0	-	-	-	-	-	-	1 (3)	0
Hornchurch	2004	?	?	-	-	-	-	-	-	?	?
Hornchurch	All	?	?	-	-	-	-	-	-	?	?
Burton Albion	2004	1	0	-	-	-	-	-	-	1	0
Burton Albion	All	1	0	-	-	-	-	-	-	1	0
Morecambe	2004–05	18 (5)	3	-	-	-	-	1	0	19 (5)	3
Morecambe	All	18 (5)	3	-	-	-	-	1	0	19 (5)	3
Crawley Town	2005	4 (1)	0	-	-	-	-	-	-	4 (1)	0
Crawley Town	All	4 (1)	0	-	-	-	-	-	-	4 (1)	0
Weymouth	2005–07	23	2	3	0	-	-	-	-	26	2
Weymouth	All	23	2	3	0	-	-	-	-	26	2
Exeter City	2007	5(12)	6	-	-	-	-	-	-	5 (12)	6
Exeter City	All										
Career totals		187 (41)	39	7 (2)	1	-	-	10	0	204 (43)	40

Source: Soccerbase
