= Lee Johnson (footballer) =

English football manager (born 1981)

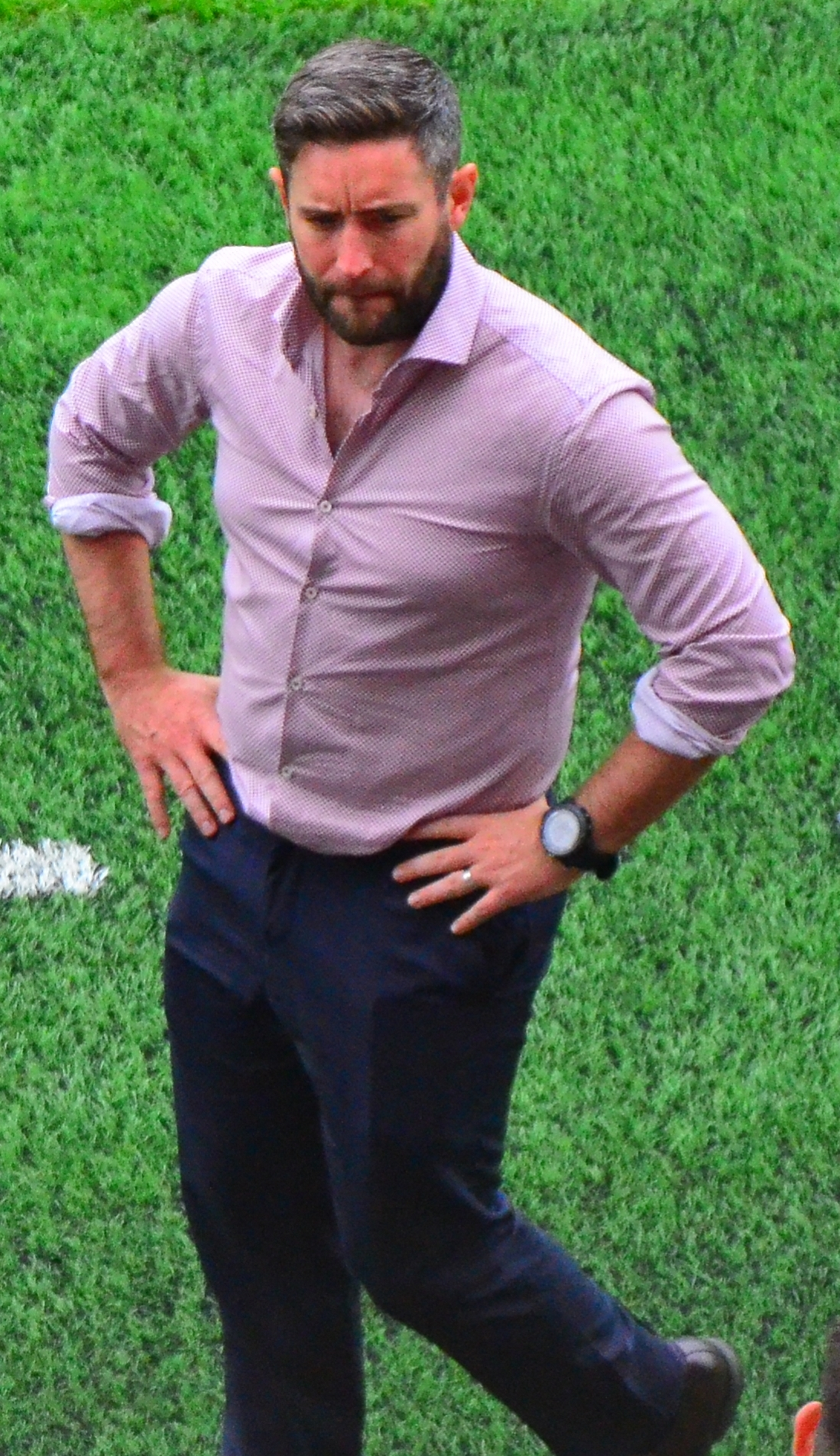
- Johnson managing Bristol City in 2016

Personal information
- Full name: Lee Johnson
- Date of birth: 7 June 1981 (age 45)
- Place of birth: Newmarket, England
- Height: 5 ft 6 in (1.68 m)
- Position: Midfielder

Team information
- Current team: Lommel (head coach)

Youth career
- 1997–1998: Arsenal
- 1998–2000: Watford

Senior career*
| Years | Team | Apps | (Gls) |
| 2000–2001 | Brighton & Hove Albion | 0 | (0) |
| 2001 | Brentford | 0 | (0) |
| 2001–2006 | Yeovil Town | 192 | (23) |
| 2006 | Heart of Midlothian | 4 | (0) |
| 2006–2012 | Bristol City | 174 | (11) |
| 2010 | → Derby County (loan) | 4 | (0) |
| 2011 | → Chesterfield (loan) | 11 | (0) |
| 2012–2013 | Kilmarnock | 20 | (0) |
| Total | | 405 | (34) |

International career
| 2003 | England C | 5 | (1) |

Managerial career
- 2013–2015: Oldham Athletic
- 2015–2016: Barnsley
- 2016–2020: Bristol City
- 2020–2022: Sunderland
- 2022–2023: Hibernian
- 2023: Fleetwood Town
- 2025–: Lommel
- * Club domestic league appearances and goals

Lee Johnson (born 7 June 1981) is an English professional football manager, former footballer, who is the currently head coach of Lommel.

Prior to becoming a manager, he played as a midfielder for Brighton & Hove Albion, Yeovil Town, Heart of Midlothian, Bristol City, Derby County, Chesterfield and Kilmarnock.

Johnson made his managerial debut with Oldham Athletic in 2013 and led the club to safety. In February 2015 he took over as head coach of Barnsley, and a year later he was appointed as the new manager of Bristol City after an undisclosed compensation fee was agreed. Under Johnson's management, City finished twelve points above the relegation zone in eighteenth place. In July 2020, Johnson was dismissed as head coach; he was then the longest-serving manager in the Championship.

In December 2020 he became head coach of Sunderland. Johnson won the EFL Trophy a few months later, in what was Sunderland's first Wembley triumph since the 1973 FA Cup final. A short run of poor results and a heavy defeat away to Bolton Wanderers led to him being replaced by Alex Neil. Johnson was appointed Hibernian manager in May 2022, and he was sacked in August 2023. He then became manager of Fleetwood Town, but was sacked from this role after just three months.

== Early life ==
Born in Newmarket, Suffolk, Johnson is the only child of Caron and football manager Gary Johnson. He began his career as a youth player with Arsenal, but left the club aged 17 after a feud with a coach. He then went on to join Watford, whose youth system was run by his father; he did not make a senior appearance for the club prior to his departure in 2000.

== Playing career ==
In 2000, Johnson signed for Brighton & Hove Albion, scoring in his only appearance for the club against Cardiff City in the Football League Trophy, before having a non-contract spell with Brentford during the final months of the 2000–01 season, in which he failed to receive a call into the squad. He then went on to sign for Conference side Yeovil Town in July 2001 on a free transfer. Managed by his father Gary, Yeovil achieved two promotions, reaching the Football League Second Division. In this time, Johnson won the player of the year award three times consecutively.

Johnson joined Scottish Premier League club Heart of Midlothian on 11 January 2006 for a transfer fee of £50,000, signing onto a two-and-a-half-year contract. His debut came as a late substitute in a 4–1 victory over Dunfermline Athletic, and he started his first game in another 4–1 win over Hearts' Edinburgh derby rivals Hibernian. Less than two months after Johnson joined Hearts, manager Graham Rix was sacked, which resulted in Johnson receiving less game time: he only made one substitute appearance prior to his departure, six months after signing.

In August 2006, Johnson rejoined his father at Bristol City. On 12 August 2006, Huddersfield Town manager Peter Jackson was sent to the stands after grabbing Johnson around the throat in a touchline incident 10 minutes from full-time. He was part of the Bristol City team that won promotion to the Championship in the 2006–07 league campaign.

In the 2007–08 season, Johnson's Bristol City team reached the Championship play-off final, which they lost 1–0 to Hull City.

On 1 January 2010, Johnson joined fellow Championship side Derby County on an initial month-long loan. He played his first game for Derby the following day, in an FA Cup fixture at Millwall, which ended in a 1–1 draw. Johnson returned to Bristol City after this spell came to an end. Despite Derby intending to retain Johnson until the end of the season, Bristol City refused. He subsequently went on loan to Chesterfield in August 2011. His stint at Bristol City concluded on 31 January 2012, after his contract was mutually terminated.

On 10 February 2012, Johnson signed a two-and-a-half-year deal with Scottish side Kilmarnock, returning to Scotland after his departure from Hearts six years previously. On 18 March, he played in the Scottish League Cup final, in which Kilmarnock were victorious over Celtic, when Johnson set up the winning goal in their 1–0 success. He left Kilmarnock in January 2013, after his contract was mutually terminated.

Johnson was eligible to play for the Gibraltar national football team, due to the birthplace of his grandmother. In September 2014, the Gibraltar Football Association contacted him regarding interest in playing for the national team in the Euro 2016 qualifiers. Despite considering the offer, he declined, stating, "I don't really want to be running after the world champions when we've [Oldham] got a game on Saturday."

== Managerial career ==
=== Oldham Athletic ===
On 18 March 2013, Johnson was appointed manager of EFL League One side Oldham Athletic, signing a two-year contract. At the age of 31, his appointment made him the youngest manager in the English Football League, with him also managing in the same league as his father, Gary, who was then the manager of Yeovil Town. His first game in charge was a 3–0 victory over Hartlepool United the day after his appointment, which saw Oldham move out of the relegation zone. He went on to lead the club to safety soon afterwards, with a run of form notable for wins against Bury and promotion-chasing Yeovil, which was also highlighted as it was reported to be the first instance of father and son managing against each other since Bill Dodgin Sr. of Bristol Rovers and Bill Dodgin Jr. of Fulham faced each other in the early 1970s.

During the off-season prior to his first full season in charge, Johnson vowed to make changes to the squad, resulting in a change of play which lead to fan favourite Robbie Simpson controversially being on the list of players that were released by the club. However, Johnson hit back completing the signings of James Dayton, Sidney Schmeltz and Korey Smith. The latter chose to make his initial loan into a permanent deal with Johnson also appointing the player as the new team captain. Oldham started the season as Johnson intended, winning 4–3 at Stevenage.

In January various changes were made, notably losing the services of James Tarkowski to Brentford for an undisclosed fee. Johnson made signings that would go on to make a big impact to Oldham's second half of the season, most notably the loan of Gary Harkins from St. Mirren. After various excellent performances throughout the first half of the season, Johnson was rewarded with a renewed contract, extending it until the summer of 2018, stating, "I love the club, the new contract extension makes me feel valued by the owner and the board. I know I will get it right and that I will be given time to do that, at what is a fantastic club". As their season came to a close, the Latics ended the season on a 10-game unbeaten run, which saw the club finish fifteenth, two points short of the top–half of the table, making this the club's best finish for the side since the end of the 2008–09 season under John Sheridan.

During the first half of the 2014–15 league campaign, Johnson led his side to the top ten of the league, which soon saw his name emerge with links to a variety of clubs.

=== Barnsley ===
On 25 February 2015, Johnson was appointed as the new head coach of fellow EFL League One club Barnsley, after an undisclosed compensation package was agreed between the Tykes and Oldham Athletic for the services of Johnson and his assistant Tommy Wright. His first match in charge was a 1–0 victory at Gillingham, three days after his appointment. Despite taking over the club whilst they sat sixteenth and were underachieving, Johnson guided the club to an eleventh-placed finish, after their form resulted in them picking up five victories, six draws and three defeats.

During his first full season in charge, Johnson had Barnsley in mixed form prior to the new year period, picking up ten victories out of a possible thirty, including an eight-game losing streak. However, 2016 saw Barnsley achieve a seven-game winning streak which moved the side higher up the league positions. Johnson's name emerged as many club's targets to fulfil their managerial posts, and by the time he left Barnsley, the club were sat twelfth, a huge improvement on them sitting twenty-second in the table in November. He had also led the club to the EFL Trophy final, in which his successor Paul Heckingbottom managed to claim the cup win. He left Barnsley on 6 February 2016.

=== Bristol City ===
On 6 February 2016, Johnson was appointed as the new manager of relegation-threatened Championship club Bristol City, signing onto a three-and-a-half-year deal, after an undisclosed compensation fee was agreed between the Robins and Barnsley. Under Johnson's management, City went on to record several victories during their sixteen games in the league, eventually finishing a comfortable twelve points above the relegation zone in eighteenth place. Despite the loan signing of Tammy Abraham, who scored 26 goals for the club in the 2016–17 season, City remained in the relegation dogfight until the penultimate game of the season, eventually finishing three points above the relegation zone in seventeenth place, a minor improvement on their previous season's finish.

Despite some fans demanding Johnson be dismissed, he remained as City manager ahead of the 2017–18 season, and brought in right-back Eros Pisano and Senegalese striker Famara Diedhiou to boost their hopes of success, the latter signing for a club record transfer fee of £5.3 million. In October 2017, Johnson received manager of the month award for September, after guiding City to an undefeated streak of six games, scoring thirteen goals across that month. Later that month, as part of an interview for the BBC Points West programme, Johnson described his past of receiving death threats across the previous season, after completing the signing of Bristol Rovers striker Matty Taylor, also revealing how he was forced to move home, following the aftermath of his family's home address being publicised online.

In the 2017–18 season, Johnson led the club to the semi-finals of the EFL Cup, defeating several Premier League clubs in the lead up, notably defeating José Mourinho's Manchester United. During the semi-finals, Bristol City exited the competition after a 3–5 aggregate defeat to eventual champions Manchester City, a game in which saw opposition manager Pep Guardiola praise Johnson for his side's style of play. City ended the season in eleventh place in the Championship, eight points adrift from play-off qualification. In their following league campaign, Johnson's side finished the season in eighth place, their best league finish since the 2007–08 season, despite maintaining fifth position towards the closing stages of the season.

On 23 May 2019, Johnson signed a new four-year contract with Bristol City, keeping him at the club until the summer of 2023. That October, he was charged with misconduct by the FA as a response to alleged language towards a match official. He received a £2,000 fine and a one-match ban. Following a run of four consecutive defeats, on 4 July 2020, Johnson was dismissed as head coach of Bristol City. Having been appointed in February 2016, he was the longest-serving manager in the Championship prior to his departure.

=== Sunderland ===
On 5 December 2020, Johnson was appointed the new head coach of Sunderland following the departure of Phil Parkinson. He signed a two-and-a-half-year deal with the club. Despite only being announced that morning, his first game in charge was later that afternoon, with his new side losing 1–0 at home to Wigan Athletic. On 14 March 2021, Sunderland won the 2021 EFL Trophy Final, beating Tranmere Rovers 1–0 courtesy of a goal from Lynden Gooch. After a short run of poor results, ending with a 6–0 defeat away to Bolton Wanderers, Johnson was sacked by Sunderland on 30 January 2022.

=== Hibernian ===
Johnson was appointed manager of Scottish Premiership club Hibernian on 19 May 2022. Following a "rollercoaster" stint as Hibs manager, Johnson was sacked on 27 August 2023 after a third consecutive league defeat that left the club bottom of the Scottish Premiership.

During his time at Hibernian, Johnson was involved in a training match, in which his tackle on Jake Doyle-Hayes left the midfielder needing surgery. In May 2025, Doyle-Hayes began legal action against the club, claiming his career had been "greatly restricted" as a result.

=== Fleetwood Town ===
Two weeks after leaving Hibernian, Johnson was appointed manager of Fleetwood Town. Johnson was sacked on 30 December 2023 after a 2–0 loss to home to Bolton Wanderers.

=== Lommel ===
Johnson was appointed on a short-term contract to prepare Manchester City's fringe and development players ahead of the 2024-25 Premier League season, with a range of top players from across the City Football Group flown to Manchester to take part in Johnson's sessions. He described working with City manager Pep Guardiola and City's players as "...a brilliant experience." After completing his tenure with CFG, he spent time with Danish Superliga club FC Copenhagen and also worked in Nigeria as a scout.

In March 2025, Johnson was appointed as head coach of Challenger Pro League side Lommel, a member of the CFG, until the end of the season.

== Personal life ==
At the time of his appointment as Oldham Athletic manager in 2013, three members of his family were chief scouts at different football clubs.

== Playing statistics ==
Appearances and goals by club, season and competition
| Club | Season | League | | | FA Cup | | League Cup | | Other | | Total | |
| Club | Season | Division | Apps | Goals | Apps | Goals | Apps | Goals | Apps | Goals | Apps | Goals |
|---|---|---|---|---|---|---|---|---|---|---|---|---|
| Brighton & Hove Albion | 2000–01 | Third Division | 0 | 0 | 0 | 0 | 0 | 0 | 1 (Note: Appearances in Football League Trophy) | 1 | 1 | 1 |
| Brentford | 2000–01 | Second Division | 0 | 0 | — | | — | | 0 | 0 | 0 | 0 |
| Yeovil Town | 2001–02 | Conference | 36 | 5 | 0 | 0 | — | | 10 (Note: Seven appearances in FA Trophy, two appearances in Football League Trophy, one appearance in Somerset Premier Cup) | 0 | 46 | 5 |
| Yeovil Town | 2002–03 | Conference | 41 | 4 | 2 | 0 | — | | 5 (Note: Four appearances in FA Trophy, one appearance in Football League Trophy) | 0 | 48 | 4 |
| Yeovil Town | 2003–04 | Third Division | 45 | 5 | 3 | 0 | 1 | 0 | 2 | 0 | 51 | 5 |
| Yeovil Town | 2004–05 | League Two | 44 | 7 | 5 | 1 | 2 | 3 | 1 | 0 | 52 | 11 |
| Yeovil Town | 2005–06 | League One | 26 | 3 | 3 | 1 | 2 | 0 | 1 | 0 | 32 | 3 |
| Yeovil Town | Total | | 192 | 23 | 13 | 2 | 5 | 3 | 19 | 0 | 229 | 28 |
| Heart of Midlothian | 2005–06 | Scottish Premier League | 4 | 0 | 1 | 0 | 0 | 0 | 0 | 0 | 5 | 0 |
| Bristol City | 2006–07 | League One | 42 | 5 | 6 | 0 | 1 | 0 | 5 | 0 | 54 | 5 |
| Bristol City | 2007–08 | Championship | 40 | 1 | 1 | 0 | 1 | 0 | 3 (Note: Appearances in Football League Championship play-offs) | 0 | 45 | 1 |
| Bristol City | 2008–09 | Championship | 44 | 3 | 2 | 0 | 2 | 0 | — | | 48 | 3 |
| Bristol City | 2009–10 | Championship | 28 | 1 | 0 | 0 | 2 | 0 | — | | 30 | 1 |
| Bristol City | 2010–11 | Championship | 20 | 1 | 1 | 0 | 1 | 0 | — | | 22 | 1 |
| Bristol City | Total | | 174 | 11 | 10 | 0 | 5 | 0 | 8 | 0 | 197 | 11 |
| Derby County (loan) | 2009–10 | Championship | 4 | 0 | 0 | 0 | 0 | 0 | — | | 4 | 0 |
| Chesterfield (loan) | 2011–12 | League One | 11 | 0 | 0 | 0 | 0 | 0 | 2 | 0 | 13 | 0 |
| Kilmarnock | 2011–12 | Scottish Premier League | 9 | 0 | 0 | 0 | 1 | 0 | — | | 10 | 0 |
| Kilmarnock | 2012–13 | Scottish Premier League | 11 | 0 | 1 | 0 | 1 | 0 | — | | 13 | 0 |
| Kilmarnock | Total | | 20 | 0 | 1 | 0 | 2 | 0 | — | | 23 | 0 |
| Career total | | | 405 | 34 | 25 | 0 | 12 | 0 | 30 | 1 | 472 | 35 |

== Managerial statistics ==
As of match played 22 November 2026

Managerial record by team and tenure
| Team | From | To | Record | | | | | Ref. |
| Team | From | To | P | W | D | L | Win % | Ref. |
|---|---|---|---|---|---|---|---|---|
| Oldham Athletic | 18 March 2013 | 25 February 2015 | 103 | 36 | 32 | 35 | 35.0 | |
| Barnsley | 25 February 2015 | 6 February 2016 | 51 | 20 | 13 | 18 | 39.2 | |
| Bristol City | 6 February 2016 | 4 July 2020 | 217 | 84 | 54 | 79 | 38.7 | |
| Sunderland | 5 December 2020 | 30 January 2022 | 78 | 40 | 20 | 18 | 51.3 | |
| Hibernian | 19 May 2022 | 27 August 2023 | 52 | 20 | 8 | 24 | 38.5 | |
| Fleetwood Town | 10 September 2023 | 30 December 2023 | 22 | 6 | 6 | 10 | 27.3 | |
| Lommel | 5 March 2025 | Present | 57 | 28 | 12 | 17 | 49.1 | |
| Total | | | 580 | 234 | 145 | 201 | 40.3 | |

== Honours ==
=== As a player ===
Yeovil Town

- Football League Two: 2004–05
- Football Conference: 2002–03
- FA Trophy: 2001–02

Bristol City

- Football League One second-place promotion: 2006–07

Kilmarnock

- Scottish League Cup: 2011–12

Individual

- PFA Team of the Year: 2004–05 Football League Two

=== As a manager ===
Sunderland

- EFL Trophy: 2020–21

Lommel SK

- Belgian Pro League promotion/relegation play-offs: 2025–26

Individual

- EFL Championship Manager of the Month: September 2017
- Football League One Manager of the Month: January 2016, August 2021, December 2021
