= Jake Edwards (footballer, born 1976) =

English footballer and sports executive

Personal information
- Date of birth: 11 May 1976 (age 50)
- Place of birth: Manchester, England
- Position: Striker

College career
Years	Team	Apps	(Gls)
1994–1997	James Madison Dukes		

Senior career*
Years	Team	Apps	(Gls)
1998–2000	Wrexham	11	(1)
1999	→ Blackpool (loan)	0	(0)
1999–2000	→ Telford United (loan)	8	(5)
2000–2002	Telford United	79	(22)
2002–2003	Charleston Battery	9	(0)
2003–2004	Yeovil Town	27	(6)
2004–2006	Exeter City	48	(6)
2005–2006	→ Tamworth (loan)	8	(4)
2006	→ Chester City (loan)	10	(1)
2006–2007	Crawley Town	21	(2)
2007	Tamworth	21	(7)
2007–2008	Burton Albion	30	(4)
2008–2010	Solihull Moors	?	(16)
Total		272+	(74)
- * Club domestic league appearances and goals

Jake Edwards (born 11 May 1976) is an English professional sports executive who currently is the CEO of English League One Club Huddersfield Town, and was formerly the President of the United Soccer League, the organising body that operates the USL Championship, USL League One and USL League Two. A two-time All-Colonial Athletic Association selection during his collegiate soccer career at James Madison University, Edwards made more than 250 professional appearances in both his native England and the United States before joining the sport's executive ranks.

== Early life ==
Edwards was born in Manchester, England. As a child, his family moved to New Jersey, USA where he attended Hanover Park High School, playing soccer all four years. He was a ball boy at the 1994 FIFA World Cup.

After graduating from Hanover Park High School, Edwards played at James Madison University. Edwards was a standout forward for the Dukes, and his 31 goals in 62 appearances are currently tied for 10th all-time in JMU's history.

During his time at JMU, Edwards was twice named to the CAA All-Conference Team, earning Second Team honors in his junior season in 1996 and First Team honors in his senior season in 1997 alongside future Major League Soccer players including Richie Kotschau (George Mason) and Adin Brown (William & Mary). Following his graduation with a Bachelor's of Science degree from JMU, Edwards returned to the United Kingdom to begin his professional career.

== Professional career ==
Edwards signed with Wrexham in 1998 and during his three years at the club had stints on loan with Blackpool and Telford United. After the success of his loan spell with Telford United, he joined the club permanently for the 2000–01 season. Over the next two seasons Edwards scored 22 goals in 79 appearances for the club as Telford finished in the top 10 in the Football Conference each season.

After a period with the United Soccer League's Charleston Battery, Edwards returned to England, where he signed with Yeovil Town as it joined the English Football League in the 2003–04 season. Edwards scored 10 goals in 20 appearances across all competitions for the side as Yeovil reached the Third Round of the F.A. Cup before being eliminated by the Premier League's Liverpool FC.

The following season Edwards joined Exeter City FC, which also reached the Third Round of the F.A. Cup to be drawn away against Manchester United, where Edwards and his teammates claimed a 0–0 draw at Old Trafford to earn a replay on home turf. In addition to making almost 50 appearances for Exeter, Edwards also spent time on loan with Tamworth and Chester City during his two seasons at the club.

Edwards also played for Crawley Town, Tamworth, Burton Albion and Solihull Moors before his retirement as a player.

== Administrative career ==
Prior to his retirement as player, Edwards also served as the commercial manager for his final club, Solihull Moors FC, where he increased on-field advertising by 50 per cent and sourced the club's first stadium naming rights sponsorship. During that time Edwards earned an MBA from Warwick Business School, and subsequently became an executive at London-based consulting firm Octagon Worldwide.

During his time with Octagon, Edwards worked as a business strategy consultant in the rights holder side of the business where he worked with groups across numerous sports properties, including writing a business plan for Emirates Cricket on their proposed professional cricket league based on the hugely successful Indian Premier League.

On 29 June 2013, Edwards was appointed as Vice President of the United Soccer League in the United States, and led a major overhaul of the league property that saw the evolution of the league's branding prior to the 2015 season. Following the departure of Tim Holt in the spring of 2015, Edwards was named as USL President, and has since overseen a major expansion of the league's franchise base and club's values.

During Edwards' tenure as president, the USL Championship has expanded to more than 30 clubs and prior to the 2017 season earned Division II sanctioning from the U.S. Soccer Federation. Following that announcement, Edwards and the USL announced plans in April 2017 for the establishment of a new Division III league that would begin play in Spring 2019.

In 2018, Edwards and the USL's leadership including Chief Executive Officer Alec Papadakis and Chief Operating Officer Justin Papadakis led a re-branding and streamlining of the league's brand which introduced a new corporate mark for the USL and the establishment of the USL Championship, USL League One – the official name of the organization's Division III league – and USL League Two – previously known as the Premier Development League – for the 2019 season.

During Edwards' tenure, the organization also established USL Productions, which saw an investment of more than $8 million that created a national broadcast provider in partnership with Vista WorldLink. Through the establishment of USL Productions, the USL Championship entered into a two-year agreement in 2018 with ESPN to become one of the first professional soccer leagues to feature on its new standalone platform, ESPN+, which also saw additional broadcasts including the 2018 and 2019 USL Cup aired on over-the-air ESPN networks. In 2018, the USL Cup was aired for the first time on ESPN2, reaching an audience of 75 million fans in the United States, and in more than 50 countries on ESPN International.

In 2023, Edwards became CEO of English League One football club Huddersfield Town. He was brought in by the new owner Kevin Nagle as part of his new management team.

== Sources ==
- Jake Edwards, One-on-One: Pro/rel ideas for USL, how Indy Eleven joined and the U.S. Soccer election
- USL confirms new branding, league structure
- USL president Jake Edwards bullish on future of league, quest for second-division status | MLSsoccer.com
- How Jake Edwards became a key figure in US soccer - with help of Saint and Greavsie
- USL executive VP Jake Edwards becomes new league president
