= Leon Kelly (footballer) =

English footballer

Personal information
- Date of birth: 26 June 1978 (age 48)
- Place of birth: Coventry, England
- Position: Forward

Senior career*
Years	Team	Apps	(Gls)
1997	Massey Ferguson		
1997–2001	Atherstone United		
2001–2003	Cambridge United	2	(0)
2001	→ Stalybridge Celtic (loan)	8	(3)
2001	→ Nuneaton Borough (loan)	3	(0)
2002	→ Dover Athletic (loan)	13	(3)
2002–2003	Ilkeston Town		
2003–2006	Worcester City		
2006–2008	Hinckley United	73	(15)
2008–2009	Solihull Moors		
2009	Bromsgrove Rovers		
2008–2009	Aylesbury United		
- * Club domestic league appearances and goals

Leon Kelly (born 26 June 1978) is an English former footballer who played in the Football League for Cambridge United. His uncle Tony was also a professional footballer.
