= Dani Rodrigues =

Portuguese footballer

Personal information
- Full name: Daniel Ferreira Rodrigues
- Date of birth: 3 March 1980 (age 46)
- Place of birth: São João da Madeira, Portugal
- Height: 1.80 m (5 ft 11 in)
- Position: Winger

Youth career
- 1990–1997: Feirense

Senior career*
Years	Team	Apps	(Gls)
1997–1999	Feirense	22	(1)
1998–1999	→ AFC Bournemouth (loan)	5	(0)
1999–2002	Southampton	2	(0)
2000	→ Bristol City (loan)	4	(0)
2001–2002	→ Bristol City (loan)	4	(0)
2002–2003	Walsall	1	(0)
2003–2004	Ionikos	14	(2)
2004	Yeovil Town	4	(4)
2004–2006	AFC Bournemouth	52	(6)
2006–2007	New Zealand Knights	4	(0)
2007	Eastleigh	4	(0)
2007	Dorchester Town	4	(0)
2007–2008	Digenis Akritas	6	(0)
2008–2009	Onisilos	16	(1)
2009–2010	ASIL Lysi	24	(4)
2010–2011	Omonia Aradippou	23	(2)
2011–2012	Doxa	0	(0)
Total		189	(20)

International career
1998–1999	Portugal U20	6	(1)
2002	Portugal U21	2	(1)
- * Club domestic league appearances and goals

Daniel 'Dani' Ferreira Rodrigues (born 3 March 1980) is a Portuguese former footballer who played as a winger.

== Club career ==
=== Portugal ===
Born in São João da Madeira, Rodrigues started his career for Feirense, playing one full season in the Segunda Liga. In November 1998, he went on loan to AFC Bournemouth in England, being spotted by scouts from nearby Premier League club Southampton, who recommended him to manager Glenn Hoddle.

=== England ===
In an act of "un-neighbourly piracy", Southampton nipped in and signed Rodrigues from Feirense for £200,000. He played two games as a substitute at the end of the 1999–2000 campaign, against Leicester City and Wimbledon.

Rodrigues showed promise and, when he went on loan to Bristol City at the end of 2000, he was an instant hit, but he broke an ankle in a match against Reading. He returned to the Saints and was fighting his way back to full fitness, when he broke the same ankle in training.

In an effort to rebuild his career, Rodrigues spent another spell on loan to Bristol City. Southampton released him from his contract in July 2002, and he was acquired by Walsall on a free transfer.

=== Greece / Return to England ===
Rodrigues was released by Walsall in January 2003, having made just one substitute appearance against Ipswich Town. He moved to Ionikos in Greece shortly after, scoring both of his Super League goals for the side in the last round as they narrowly avoided top-flight relegation.

In March 2004, Rodrigues returned to England by joining Yeovil Town on a short-term contract, and netted four times in as many appearances, including a brace after coming off the bench on his debut against Bury. His exploits impressed Bournemouth boss Sean O'Driscoll, and he re-joined the latter for a second spell at the start of 2004–05.

In his second spell at Dean Court, with the club still competing in the Football League One, Rodrigues scored seven goals from 60 competitive matches.

=== New Zealand Knights ===
In August 2006, Rodrigues signed for New Zealand Knights (who however took part in the Australian A-League). He was seriously injured once again, this time with a rupture of the anterior cruciate ligament which kept him out of the game for the rest of the season.

=== Final spell in England ===
On 20 September 2007, Rodrigues joined Eastleigh. He was soon deemed surplus to requirements, after the arrival of new manager Ian Baird.

On 2 November of the same year, Rodrigues moved to the Conference South with Dorchester Town. He made his debut in a match at Newport County on the following day; on 29 December, the Magpies announced the player would not remain with the team.

=== Cyprus ===
For the 2008–09 campaign, Rodrigues signed for Onisilos in the Cypriot Second Division. He would remain in the country in the following years, representing several clubs.
