= Kevin Gall =

Welsh footballer (born 1982)

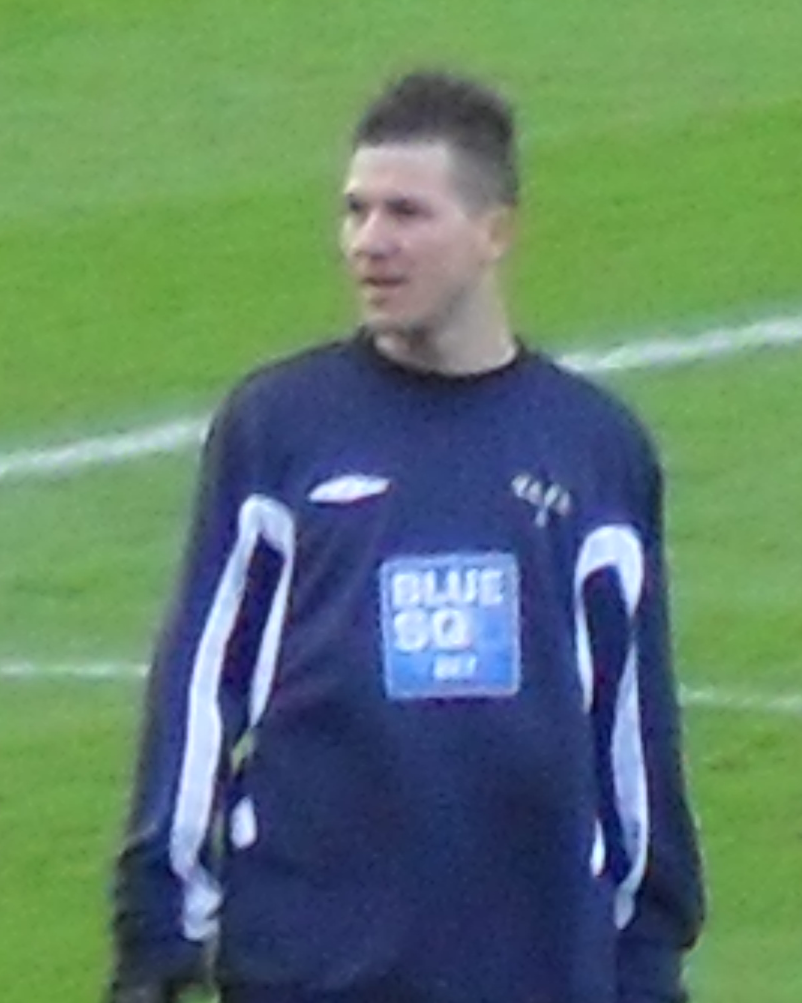
- Gall with York City in 2009

Personal information
- Full name: Kevin Alexander Gall
- Date of birth: 4 February 1982 (age 44)
- Place of birth: Merthyr Tydfil, Wales
- Height: 5 ft 9 in (1.75 m)
- Positions: Winger; striker

Youth career
- 199?–1997: Cardiff City
- 1997–2001: Newcastle United

Senior career*
Years	Team	Apps	(Gls)
2001–2003	Bristol Rovers	50	(5)
2003–2006	Yeovil Town	136	(26)
2006–2009	Carlisle United	66	(9)
2008	→ Darlington (loan)	8	(0)
2008–2009	→ Lincoln City (loan)	9	(0)
2009	→ Port Vale (loan)	7	(0)
2009	Darlington	10	(2)
2009–2010	York City	5	(1)
2010–2011	Wrexham	5	(0)
2011	FC Dallas	0	(0)
2011	Workington		
2011	Guiseley	5	(0)
2012–2013	Stockport Sports		
Total		301	(43)

International career
- Wales U20
2002–2004	Wales U21	8	(1)
- * Club domestic league appearances and goals

Kevin Alexander Gall (born 4 February 1982) is a Welsh former footballer who played as a winger and striker, scoring 49 goals in 352 league and cup appearances in a 12-year career. He also represented Wales at under-21 level.

Gall, a former Welsh under-21 international, started his career with Newcastle United before signing for Bristol Rovers. After 50 league games for Rovers, he moved to Yeovil Town in 2003. He spent three years at Yeovil before joining Carlisle United in 2006. He had loan spells at Darlington, Lincoln City, and Port Vale before joining Darlington permanently in 2009. He then had one-year spells at York City and Wrexham before a brief spell in the US with FC Dallas. He returned to England to play for Workington in September 2011 before moving on to Guiseley the following month. He joined Stockport Sports in December 2012.

== Club career ==
Born in Merthyr Tydfil, Gall played for Cardiff City as a trainee before signing for Newcastle United in 1997, who had to pay Cardiff £150,000 in compensation. He formed a strike partnership with Shola Ameobi in the youth team. With limited opportunities at Newcastle, he attended a trial at Lilleshall, where he was offered a contract by Bristol Rovers. He signed on a short-term contract, before making the deal permanent in March 2001. He played at Rovers for two seasons. He moved on to Yeovil Town in 2003, where he played in midfield, as opposed to his usual role as a striker. In an FA Cup match against Charlton Athletic, Gall ran half the pitch to set up a goal for Paul Terry. Even though Yeovil lost that match 3–2, Gall received the Performance of the Round Award the following week. Gall was released by Yeovil in May 2006, before signing for Carlisle United on a two-year contract in June. He scored his first league goal against his former club Yeovil.

On 28 January 2008, he joined League Two side Darlington on a one-month loan. His loan was extended for a second month in February, and in March, he stated he was interested in signing permanently. In March, Gall had a trial with Major League Soccer club Toronto FC, but he rejected their offer after failing to agree terms. On 28 July, Gall joined Lincoln City on a five-month loan deal, but failed to score in his time at Sincil Bank and returned to Carlisle at the start of 2009. On 24 February, he was loaned out to Port Vale, and manager Dean Glover hoped Gall's pace and tenacity would help resurrect some of Vale's season. Despite not scoring in his seven games, Glover was keen to extend Gall's loan, however, a calf injury ruled out this option for the cash strapped club. Carlisle released him at the end of the 2008–09 season and he had a trial with former club Yeovil in July. During the week before Darlington's game against his former club, Port Vale, on 22 August, it was announced that the club had signed Gall on a free transfer. He left the bottom placed club in October 2009, having scored twice in 12 games.

Gall signed for Conference Premier team York City on a contract until January 2010 on 10 November, making his debut as a 70th minute substitute in a 3–2 victory over Chester City. He scored his first goal in a 4–1 victory over Hayes & Yeading United in January 2010 after entering the game as a 60th-minute substitute. He later extended his contract until the end of the 2009–10 season. He finished the season with nine appearances and one goal for York, and the club announced that he would be released when his contract expired on 30 June.

He agreed to sign for Conference Premier team Wrexham on 1 July, and he made his debut as a 90th-minute substitute in a 1–0 victory over Cambridge United on 14 August. His first start for the club came in a 2–0 victory at Bath City on 30 August. However, manager Dean Saunders changed the playing system, leaving Gall in the reserves. He, therefore, agreed to have his contract cancelled in January 2011.

In March 2011, Gall flew to the United States and signed a short deal with FC Dallas, but returned to Britain after he was denied a visa. He joined Workington in September 2011 in what was described as a "major transfer coup" for manager Darren Edmondson, making his debut as a substitute in the club's 3–0 Conference North defeat to Hyde at Borough Park on 10 September. After just four games and 314 minutes on the pitch for the "Reds", Gall signed a contract with league rivals Guiseley the following month. His stay with the "Lions" was also brief, and he left the club after just five league appearances.

On 28 December 2012, he signed for Stockport Sports, debuting the following day in a 2–0 home North West Counties League victory over Congleton Town.

== International career ==
Gall is a former Wales schoolboy, youth and under-21 international. He was called into the under-21 team for the game against Norway in September 2001, and a training camp in April 2002. He made his under-21 debut in November, scoring against Azerbaijan in a 1–0 victory, which was the team's first victory in 26 games.

== Style of play ==
Gall played as a striker, although he was versatile and could also play as a winger.

== Personal and later life ==
Gall is a devout Christian and, from January 2010 onwards, underwent 40 hours of tattooing to cover both his arms with religious and other symbols, including Jesus, a Bible and the Virgin Mary. He went on to work as a football consultant at agency firm Sports Management International, spotting talent from the Manchester area, Wales and the North East. Gall is also a director of Optima Sport, which brings academy football teams from across the world to compete against academies in the UK.

== Career statistics ==
Appearances and goals by club, season and competition
Club	Season	League			FA Cup		League Cup		Other^{[A]}		Total^{[B]}	
Club	Season	Division	Apps	Goals	Apps	Goals	Apps	Goals	Apps	Goals	Apps	Goals
Bristol Rovers	2000–01	Second Division	10	2	0	0	0	0	0	0	10	2
Bristol Rovers	2001–02	Third Division	31	3	3	0	2	0	3	0	39	3
Bristol Rovers	2002–03	Third Division	9	0	1	0	0	0	1	0	11	0
Bristol Rovers	Total		50	5	4	0	2	0	4	0	60	5
Yeovil Town	2002–03	Football Conference	13	13	0	0	—		2	1	15	14
Yeovil Town	2003–04	Third Division	43	8	3	1	1	0	2	1	49	10
Yeovil Town	2004–05	League Two	44	3	5	0	2	0	1	0	52	3
Yeovil Town	2005–06	League One	36	2	3	0	2	1	1	0	42	3
Yeovil Town	Total		136	26	11	1	5	1	6	2	158	30
Carlisle United	2006–07	League One	45	8	1	0	1	0	1	0	48	8
Carlisle United	2007–08	League One	21	1	2	0	2	0	2	2	27	3
Carlisle United	2008–09	League One	0	0	0	0	0	0	0	0	0	0
Carlisle United	Total		66	9	3	0	3	0	3	2	75	11
Darlington (loan)	2007–08	League Two	8	0	—		—		—		8	0
Lincoln City (loan)	2008–09	League Two	9	0	0	0	1	0	1	0	11	0
Port Vale (loan)	2008–09	League Two	7	0	—		—		—		7	0
Darlington	2009–10	League Two	10	2	0	0	0	0	2	0	12	2
York City	2009–10	Conference Premier	5	1	1	0	—		3	0	9	1
Wrexham	2010–11	Conference Premier	5	0	0	0	—		0	0	5	0
Guiseley	2010–11	Conference North	5	0	0	0	—		2	0	7	0
Career total			301	43	19	1	11	1	21	4	352	49

A. The "Other" column constitutes appearances and goals (including those as a substitute) in the Football League Trophy and FA Trophy.
B. Statistics for FC Dallas, Workington, and Stockport Sports unavailable.

== Honours ==
Yeovil Town

- Football League Two: 2004–05
- Football Conference: 2002–03

Individual

- Football Conference Goalscorer of the Month: April 2003
