= 2002–03 Yeovil Town F.C. season =

Yeovil Town
2002–03 season
- Chairman: John Fry
- Manager: Gary Johnson
- Stadium: The Avenue Stadium (Until September); Huish Park (From September)
- Conference: 1st (promoted)
- FA Cup: First round
- FA Trophy: Sixth round
- FL Trophy: First round
- Somerset Premier Cup: Runners-up
- Top goalscorer: League: Kirk Jackson (19); All: Kirk Jackson (20)
- Highest home attendance: 8,111 (26 April vs. Chester City, Conference, Huish Park)
- Lowest home attendance: 2,126 (21 September vs. Halifax Town, Conference, The Avenue Stadium)
- Average home league attendance: 4,780
Home colours	Away colours

The 2002–03 season was the 107th year in non-League football and sixth season since their return to the Football Conference played by Yeovil Town Football Club, an English football club based in Yeovil, Somerset.

Yeovil began the season playing their home matches at The Avenue Stadium, home of Dorchester Town, while the Huish Park pitch was being relaid. Yeovil occupied top spot in the Conference from late September until the end of the season, eventually winning the title by a records points margin and earning promotion to the Football League for the first time in the club's 108-year history.

The team reached the first round of the FA Cup but lost 2–0 at home to Second Division side Cheltenham Town. The team failed to defend their FA Trophy title being knocked out in the quarter-final after being beaten 2–0 by Northern Premier League side Burscough. Kirk Jackson was the club's top goalscorer after joining in November scored 20 goals, with 19 in the league and one in the FA Trophy.

== Background ==
The 2001–02 season was manager Gary Johnson's first season in charge having succeed Colin Addison in June 2001, and the team finished third in the Football Conference. Yeovil finished the season with major silverware after victory in the 2002 FA Trophy Final, staged at Villa Park. Francis Kumbur and first year professional Richard Parkisnon were released by Yeovil after the FA Trophy final while Andy Turner had his contract terminated by mutual consent. Steve Collis, Olivier Brassart, Chris Giles, Andy Lindegaard, Roy O'Brien and Faisal Mali all signed new contracts with the club.

Yeovil made two signings over the close season midfielder Gavin Williams signed from Hereford United for a fee of £22,500, and Mali striker Abdoulaye Demba formerly of Oostende joined on a free transfer. While defender Stephen Reed entered the first team squad from the youth team after agreeing a professional contract.

== Review ==
=== Pre-season ===
The squad returned for pre-season training on 1 July. The first day of pre-season saw the arrival of two new signings, Welsh attacking midfielder Gavin Williams and Mali forward Abdoulaye Demba. Yeovil started pre-season with a tour of Lavia, and on 5 July played Latvian Higher League champions Skonto with goal from Adam Stansfield and Adam Lockwood earning Yeovil a 2–2 draw. Yeovil's second match of their tour saw them beat FK Auda 1–0 courtesy of goal from Carl Alford, on 7 July. On 11 July, Yeovil concluded their pre-season tour with a 2–1 defeat FK Ventspils. Yeovil returned to England with seven friendly victories against non-league sides, and 1–0 victories over Second Division side Bristol City and Third Division side Exeter City. Yeovil's pre-season preparation featured thirteen matches in all with ten victories, two draws and one defeat with Yeovil scoring 29 goals and conceding 8. Before Yeovil's first match of the season French midfielder Olivier Brassart left the club to join Scarborough, while goalkeeper Steve Collis departed on loan to Tiverton Town.

Pre-season match details
Date	Opponents	Venue	Result	Score F–A	Scorers	Attendance	Ref
5 July 2002	Skonto	A	D	2–2	Lockwood, Stansfield	300	
7 July 2002	FK Auda	A	W	1–0	Alford	300	
11 July 2002	FK Ventspils	A	L	1–2	Grant	400	
17 July 2002	Chertsey Town	A	W	2–0	Lockwood, McIndoe	159	
20 July 2002	Salisbury City	A	W	6–2	Demba (2) McGlashan (og), Stansfield, Giles, Alford	565	
23 July 2002	Bristol City	H^{[A]}	W	1–0	McIndoe	927	
27 July 2002	Gloucester City	A	W	3–0	Lindegaard (3)	300	
30 July 2002	Chippenham Town	A	D	0–0		563	
1 August 2002	Molesey	A	W	3–0	Alford (2), Giles	114	
3 August 2002	Exeter City	A	W	1–0	Lockwood	1,472	
6 August 2002	Dorchester Town	A	W	5–1	Grant, Giles (2), O'Brien, Alford	800	
9 August 2002	Tiverton Town	A	W	3–1	Tonkin, Johnson, Way	579	
12 August 2002	Winchester City	A	W	1–0	Demba	287	

=== August ===
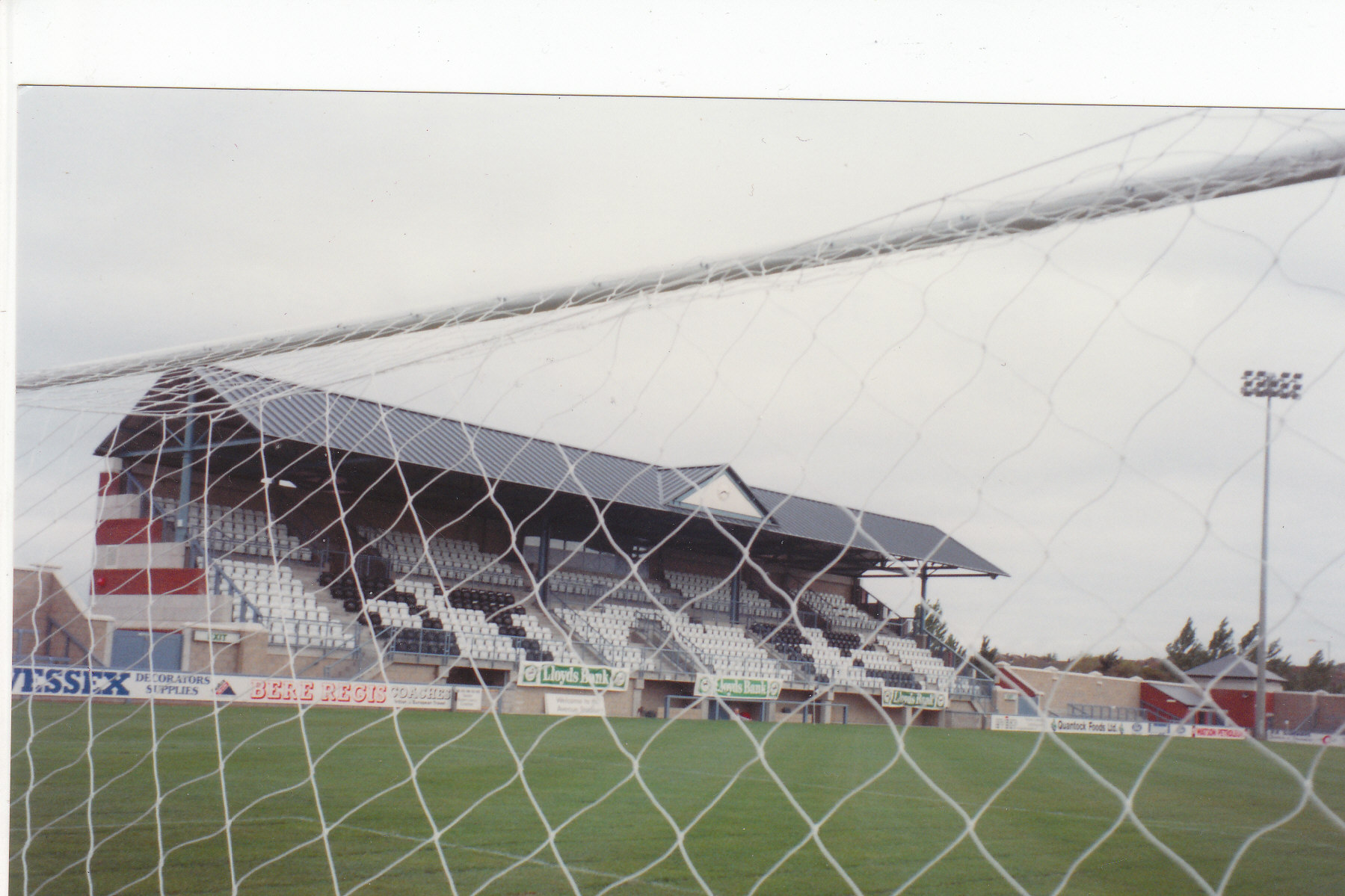
Yeovil played their first five home matches at The Avenue Stadium, Dorchester.

Yeovil began their Conference season playing their home matches at The Avenue Stadium, home of Dorchester Town, due to the relaying of the Huish Park pitch. Yeovil's opening match saw them draw 2–2 against Gravesend & Northfleet, coming from two goals behind at half time with an injury time equaliser from Terry Skiverton. The game saw striker Adam Stansfield substituted through injury after only 16 minutes that was later confirmed to be a break of the tibia and fibula an injury that ruled him out for the remainder of the season. On 20 August, Yeovil's poor start to the season continued as they suffered a 2–1 defeat away against Barnet. On 22 August, Yeovil confirmed the signing of former striker Howard Forinton after his release from Torquay United, while young striker Chris Giles left on a one-month loan to Weymouth. Yeovil ended the month with three consecutive victories, with a 2–1 win against Morecambe, a 3–2 victory over Nuneaton Borough, and a 1–0 win away at Kettering Town.

=== September ===
Yeovil started September by extending their winning run to five consecutive matches, with further victories 2–0 against Farnborough, and 2–1 versus Northwich Victoria. Two away draws followed against Stevenage Borough and Hereford United. On 20 September, Yeovil beat Halifax Town 3–0 despite having two men sent off after a mass brawl saw Abdoulaye Demba and Terry Skiverton both dismissed for violent conduct. On 22 September, Stockport County signed defender Anthony Tonkin for £50,000, a transfer that saw manager Gary Johnson hit out at the power of agents alleging that Tonkin's representative advised the player to refuse to play against Halifax. Yeovil marked their return to their newly relaid Huish Park pitch with an emphatic 4–0 victory over Woking. On 28 September, a 4–2 victory away at Leigh RMI saw Yeovil hit the top of the Conference table. The end of the month saw the club bring in French-born Moroccan left sided player Abdou El-Kholti as a replacement for the departed Tonkin.

=== October ===
Yeovil began October, with a 6–0 victory over Southport with Malian striker Abdoulaye Demba scoring a first-half hat-trick. A 1–1 draw away at Burton Albion, was followed with a 5–0 away victory over Telford United. Despite dominating their next home match against Doncaster Rovers, on 19 October, a "superb effort from 25 yards" from Gavin Williams was only enough for a 1–1 draw. On 23 October, the club faced Boston United in the first round of the Football League Trophy, after two injury time goals saw them lose 4–2 against the Third Division side. Yeovil traveled to Twerton Park to face local rivals Bath City, on 27 October, in the fourth qualifying round of the FA Cup but Yeovil were held to a 1–1 draw against their lower league rivals. The replay was played two days later, and two goals from Demba helped earn Yeovil a 3–1 victory and progress to the first round proper of the FA Cup. Yeovil's eight points from their four league matches saw manager Gary Johnson named Conference manager of the month for October.

=== November ===
Yeovil started November with consecutive 2–2 draws away at Chester City, and at home against Dagenham & Redbridge. On 16 November, Yeovil were knocked out of the first round of the FA Cup by Second Division side Cheltenham Town, after losing 2–0. Yeovil progressed to the third round of the Somerset Premier Cup, on 19 November, with a 2–1 extra time victory over Mangotsfield United, with both goals from Abdoulaye Demba. A goal from Michael McIndoe was enough to earn a 1–0 victory over Southport. Before Yeovil's final match of November, the club released Howard Forinton after 4 goals in 17 matches. While the club signed former Torquay United defender Jimmy Aggrey on a month's contract, and paid Stevenage Borough £20,000 for the services of striker Kirk Jackson, who had scored twice against Yeovil earlier in the season. Jackson made his debut in Yeovil's 2–1 victory over Margate, on 30 November, as they maintained their three-point lead at the top of the Conference.

=== December ===
Yeovil began December by suffering only their second defeat of the season, losing 2–1 away at Scarborough. On 11 December, forward Chris Giles joined fellow Conference side Gravesend & Northfleet on a three-month loan deal. Yeovil got back to winning ways with Kirk Jackson scoring his first goal for the club helped earn the club a 2–1 victory away at Northwich Victoria, and the followed it up with another Jackson goal against his former club helping Yeovil to a 2–1 win over Stevenage Borough. On Boxing Day, Yeovil traveled to struggling Forest Green Rovers and lost 2–1 as the Glovers suffered their third defeat of the season. Two days later, on 28 December, Yeovil were held to a goalless draw by Barnet. Before the match the club confirmed that striker Carl Alford has been released by the club.

=== January ===
New Year's Day, saw Yeovil get revenge for their Boxing Day defeat with a 1–0 home victory against Forest Green Rovers. On 4 January, Yeovil travelled to Northfleet, and a fourth goal in six matches from Kirk Jackson and a hat-trick from Andy Lindegaard saw Yeovil record a 4–2 victory over Gravesend & Northfleet. Abdoulaye Demba left the club for on a free transfer after struggling to settle at Yeovil, he left the club having scored 8 goals in 21 matches. Yeovil began their defence of the FA Trophy with a trip to Hereford United. Goals from defender Colin Pluck and Adam Lockwood saw Yeovil win 2–1 and qualify for the fourth round. Yeovil extended their lead at the top of the table to eight points with a 2–0 victory over Morecambe, but ended January by dropping two points away at relegation threatened Nuneaton Borough in a 1–1 draw.

=== February ===
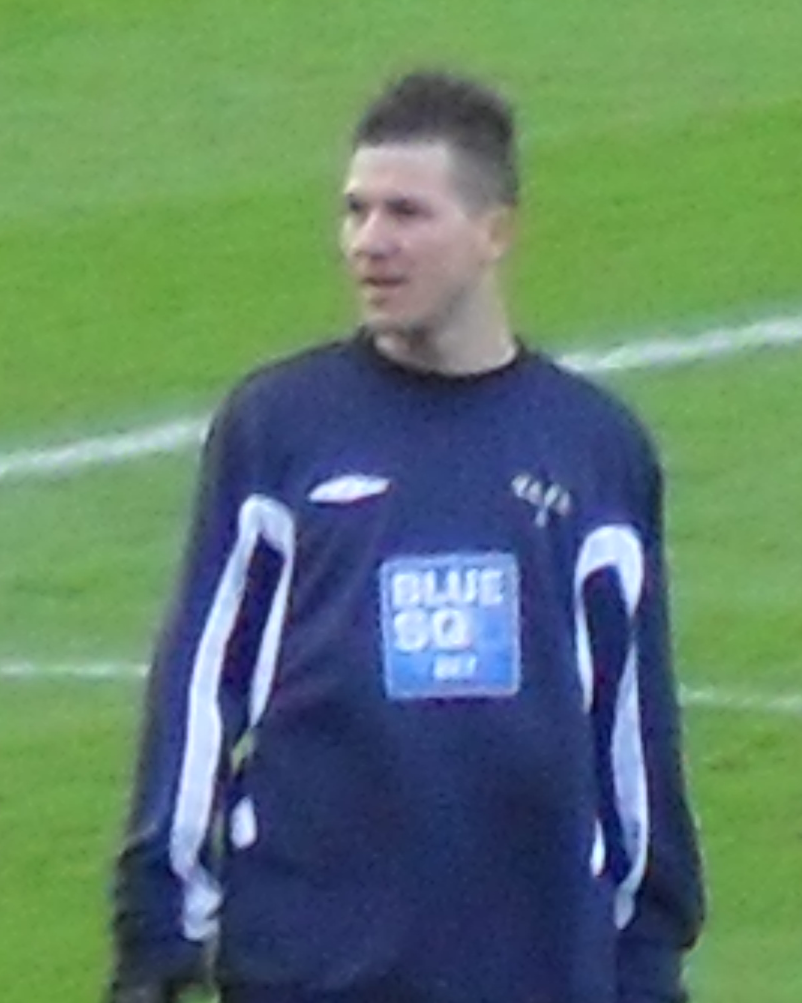
After joining the club in February, Welsh striker Kevin Gall scored 14 goals in 15 matches played.

Yeovil faced Morecambe at home in the FA Trophy fourth round and came out 2–1 victors after goals from Kirk Jackson and Terry Skiverton. Early February saw defender Tom White join Woking on a one-month loan deal, while the club signed former Bristol Rovers forward Kevin Gall and completed the loan signing of Jason Blunt from Scarborough with a view to a permanent move. New striker Kevin Gall scored on his debut as a substitute in a 4–0 home victory against Kettering Town, on 8 February. Blunt's loan spell at Yeovil was cut short after just one match after he was recalled by Scarborough after he was signed by Doncaster Rovers. After losing out with Blunt, manager Gary Johnson signed midfielder Neil Mustoe from Stevenage Borough on a free transfer until the end of the season. Yeovil extended their unbeaten league run to nine games with a 4–2 victory over Farnborough, on 9 February. Yeovil ended February with two cup victories, 2–0 over Odd Down in the Somerset Premier Cup, and a 2–1 victory against Northwich Victoria as Yeovil continued their defence of the FA Trophy.

=== March ===
Yeovil began March, with a 4–0 thrashing of rivals Hereford United, and then a second half hat-trick from Kevin Gall saw Yeovil come from two goals down to beat Halifax Town 3–2. On 8 March, top scorer Kirk Jackson grabbed his 18th goal of the season, including seven for Stevenage, to earn 10-man Yeovil a 1–1 draw at Woking. Yeovil got back to winning ways and opened up a 12-point lead at the top of the Conference with a 3–1 victory against Leigh RMI, with Jackson grabbing a brace. Yeovil's hopes of a Conference and FA Trophy double, were ended on 15 March, after a 2–0 home defeat against Burscough in the sixth round ended their defence of the title. Yeovil bounced back from their FA Trophy defeat with a 2–1 victory over Margate with another brace from Kirk Jackson. On 28 March, Yeovil ended the month with a 1–0 home victory over Scarborough. After recording four wins and a draw from their five league matches in March, Johnson picked up his second manager of the month award of the season.

=== April ===
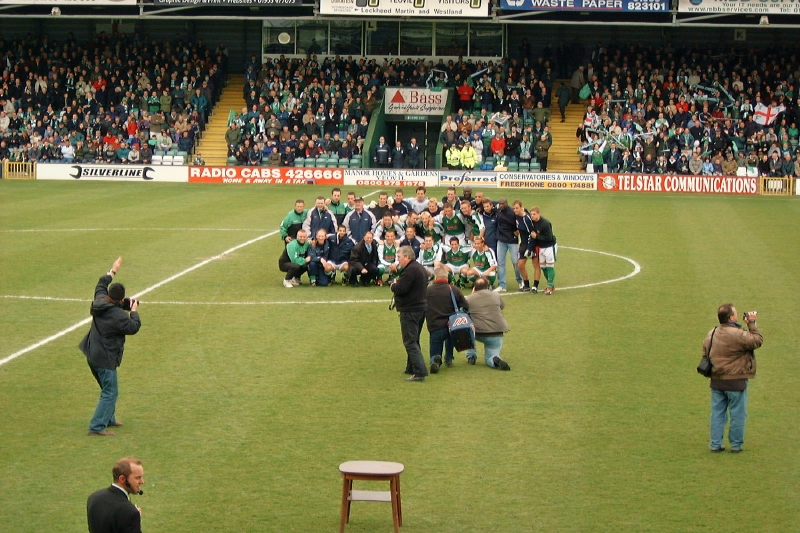
Yeovil Town celebrating their promotion to The Football League after their match against Burton Albion.

On 5 April, a 3–0 home win against Telford United took Yeovil to within one point of winning the Conference title. Before they could wrap it up they faced Clevedon Town in the semi-finals of the Somerset Premier Cup and a strong Yeovil side was to good for their lower league rivals winning 4–0. Yeovil's promotion was confirmed before kick-off against Doncaster Rovers, on 12 April, after Chester City's 2–2 draw with Woking. The Glovers celebrated their title, and promotion to the Football League for the first time in their 108-year history, with an emphatic 4–0 rout of Doncaster at Belle Vue. Yeovil continued their form with a 6–1 win over Burton Albion, on 19 April, with Kevin Gall scoring four. Yeovil's penultimate match of the season saw them travel to face play-off qualifiers Dagenham & Redbridge, a sixth goal in three matches from Kevin Gall and a Kirk Jackson hat-trick saw Yeovil record an impressive 4–0 away win, and their seventh successive win in the Conference a club record at that level. The match also saw the league debut of youth team player Stephen Reed. Yeovil completed their record breaking season against Chester City in front of 8,111 fans, the highest crowd in the Conference that season, and opened the scoring through Kevin Gall with their 100th goal in the Conference but a late equaliser forced them to settle for a 1–1 draw. After recording a further four wins and a draw from their five league matches in April, Johnson was awarded his third manager of the month award of the season, shared with Jim Harvey of Morecambe. Yeovil then faced Taunton Town, on 29 April 2003, in the final of the Somerset Premier Cup played at the home of Clevedon Town, but failed to add the cup to their Conference title losing 2–1.

== Summary and aftermath ==
After a sluggish start to the season, Yeovil occupied top spot in the Conference from late September until the end of the season, before eventually winning the title by a record 17-point margin and earning promotion to the Football League for the first time in the club's 108-year history. In the league the team were unbeaten at home winning 16 matches and drawing 5, compared to winning 12, drawing 6 and losing 3 away from home. The three defeats Yeovil suffered was the joint fewest of any team since the formation of the Conference. The club scored 100 league goals the most in the Conference and had a record goal difference of +63. The club also recorded the highest average attendance ever in the Conference of 4,741, despite starting the season playing at Dorchester. Michael McIndoe recorded the highest number of appearances during the season, appearing in 49 of Yeovil's 51 matches, excluding the Somerset Premier Cup. After joining in November, Kirk Jackson was the club's top goalscorer with 19 goals in the Conference and 20 goals for the club in all competitions, and finished as runner-up in the Conference golden boot.

The end of the season saw manager Gary Johnson release four players, including Jimmy Aggrey, Kim Grant, Neil Mustoe, Jon Sheffield, while defender Tom White was invited back to pre-season training to prove his fitness. Seven players all signed new contracts at the end of the season including striker Kevin Gall, midfielder Abdou El-Kholti, defenders Roy O'Brien and Stephen Reed as well as forwards Adam Stansfield, Andy Lindegaard and Chris Giles. While Yeovil dominated the end of season Conference awards, Johnson walked away with manager of the year, winger Michael McIndoe winning the player of the year award and he was joined in the team of the year by goalkeeper Chris Weale, captain Terry Skiverton and Darren Way.

== Club ==
=== Coaching staff ===
Position	Staff
Manager	(England) Gary Johnson
Assistant manager	(England) Steve Thompson
Reserve team manager	(Scotland) Maurice O'Donnell
Youth team manager	(England) Stuart Housley
Physiotherapist	(England) Tony Farmer

=== Kit ===
Supplier: Paulas Benara
Sponsor(s): Bradfords Building Supplies

Home	Away

== Transfers ==
=== In ===
Date	Name	From	Fee	Ref
10 May 2002	Gavin Williams	Hereford United	£22,500	
1 July 2002	Abdoulaye Demba	Oostende	Free (released)	
22 August 2002	Howard Forinton	Torquay United	Free (released)	
30 September 2002	Abdou El-Kholti	Raja Casablanca	Free (released)	
28 November 2002	Kirk Jackson	Stevenage Borough	£20,000	
28 November 2002	Jimmy Aggrey	Harrow Borough	Free (released)	
4 February 2003	Kevin Gall	Bristol Rovers	Free	
14 February 2003	Neil Mustoe	Stevenage Borough	Free	

=== Out ===
Date	Name	To	Fee	Ref
10 August 2002	Olivier Brassart	Scarborough	Free	
26 September 2002	Anthony Tonkin	Stockport County	£50,000	
24 November 2002	Howard Forinton	Oxford City	Released	
28 December 2002	Carl Alford	Nuneaton Borough	Released	
10 January 2003	Abdoulaye Demba	Oostende	Free	
29 April 2003	Jimmy Aggrey	TNS	Released	
29 April 2003	Kim Grant	Imortal	Released	
29 April 2003	Neil Mustoe	Gloucester City	Released	
29 April 2003	Jon Sheffield	Yeovil Town	Released	
30 June 2003	Tom White	Retired	Released	

=== Loan in ===
Date	Name	From	End date	Ref
4 February 2003	Jason Blunt	Scarborough	14 February 2003	

=== Loan out ===
Date	Name	To	End date	Ref
8 August 2002	Steve Collis	Tiverton Town	20 September 2002	
22 August 2002	Chris Giles	Weymouth	20 September 2002	
11 December 2002	Chris Giles	Gravesend & Northfleet	11 March 2003	
3 February 2003	Tom White	Woking	19 February 2003	

== Match results ==
=== Conference ===
Conference match details
Date	League position	Opponents	Venue	Result	Score F–A	Scorers	Attendance	Ref
17 August 2002	7th	Gravesend and Northfleet	H^{[A]}	D	2–2	Crittenden, Skiverton	2,948	
20 August 2002	15th	Barnet	A	L	1–2	Johnson	1,668	
24 August 2002	11th	Morecambe	A	W	2–1	Alford, Forinton	1,343	
26 August 2002	8th	Nuneaton Borough	H^{[A]}	W	3–2	McIndoe, Williams, Lockwood	2,504	
31 August 2002	7th	Kettering Town	A	W	1–0	Skiverton	1,670	
3 September 2002	4th	Farnborough Town	H^{[A]}	W	2–0	Crittenden, Johnson	2,231	
7 September 2002	3rd	Northwich Victoria	H^{[A]}	W	2–1	Skiverton, Grant	2,154	
14 September 2002	3rd	Stevenage Borough	A	D	2–2	Skiverton, Demba	1,879	
17 September 2002	3rd	Hereford United	A	D	0–0		2,282	
21 September 2002	2nd	Halifax Town	H^{[A]}	W	3–0	Crittenden (2 pen), Williams	2,126	
24 September 2002	2nd	Woking	H	W	4–0	Demba, McIndoe, Skiverton, Forinton	4,003	
28 September 2002	1st	Leigh RMI	A	W	4–2	Skiverton, McIndoe, Crittenden, Alford	415	
5 October 2002	1st	Southport	H	W	6–0	Demba (3), Williams, Crittenden, El Kholti	4,727	
8 October 2002	1st	Burton Albion	A	D	1–1	Demba	2,282	
13 October 2002	1st	Telford United	A	W	5–0	Crittenden (pen), Lockwood, Lindegaard, Forinton, Williams	1,509	
19 October 2002	1st	Doncaster Rovers	H	D	1–1	Williams	6,674	
2 November 2002	1st	Chester City	A	D	2–2	Crittenden, Forinton	3,821	
9 November 2002	1st	Dagenham & Redbridge	H	D	2–2	McIndoe, Smith (og)	4,289	
23 November 2002	1st	Southport	A	W	1–0	McIndoe	1,602	
30 November 2002	1st	Margate	H	W	2–1	El-Kholti, Crittenden (pen)	4,147	
7 December 2002	1st	Scarborough	A	L	1–2	El-Kholti	1,470	
14 December 2002	1st	Northwich Victoria	A	W	2–1	McIndoe, Jackson	691	
21 December 2002	1st	Stevenage Borough	H	W	2–1	Jackson, Pluck	4,940	
26 December 2002	1st	Forest Green Rovers	A	L	1–2	Skiverton	1,836	
28 December 2002	1st	Barnet	H	D	0–0		4,850	
1 January 2003	1st	Forest Green Rovers	H	W	1–0	Jackson	4,694	
4 January 2003	1st	Gravesend and Northfleet	A	W	4–2	Jackson, Lindegaard (3)	1,404	
18 January 2003	1st	Morecambe	H	W	2–0	Lindegaard, Jackson	4,353	
25 January 2003	1st	Nuneaton Borough	A	D	1–1	Lindegaard	1,717	
8 February 2003	1st	Kettering Town	H	W	4–0	Pluck, Gall, Jackson, McIndoe	4,738	
15 February 2003	1st	Farnborough Town	A	W	4–2	Johnson, McIndoe (pen), Jackson (2)	2,114	
1 March 2003	1st	Hereford United	H	W	4–0	Lockwood, Gall, Jackson, McIndoe (pen)	6,487	
4 March 2003	1st	Halifax Town	A	W	3–2	Gall (3)	2,222	
8 March 2003	1st	Woking	A	D	1–1	Jackson	3,332	
11 March 2003	1st	Leigh RMI	H	W	3–1	Jackson (2), Gall	5,330	
22 March 2003	1st	Margate	A	W	2–1	Jackson (2)	1,083	
28 March 2003	1st	Scarborough	H	W	1–0	Jackson	7,008	
5 April 2003	1st	Telford United	H	W	3–0	McIndoe (2), Jackson	7,558	
12 April 2003	1st	Doncaster Rovers	A	W	4–0	Way, McIndoe (pen), Johnson, Gall	5,344	
19 April 2003	1st	Burton Albion	H	W	6–1	Gall (4), Williams, Giles	5,691	
21 April 2003	1st	Dagenham & Redbridge	A	W	4–0	Gall, Jackson (3)	2,588	
26 April 2003	1st	Chester City	H	D	1–1	Gall	8,111	

==== League table ====
Pos	Team	Pld	W	D	L	GF	GA	GD	Pts	Promotion or relegation
1	Yeovil Town (C, P)	42	28	11	3	100	37	+63	95	Promotion to the Football League Third Division
2	Morecambe	42	23	9	10	86	42	+44	78	Qualification for the Football Conference play-offs
3	Doncaster Rovers (O, P)	42	22	12	8	73	47	+26	78	Qualification for the Football Conference play-offs
4	Chester City	42	21	12	9	59	31	+28	75	Qualification for the Football Conference play-offs
5	Dagenham & Redbridge	42	21	9	12	71	59	+12	72	Qualification for the Football Conference play-offs

(C) Champions; (O) Play-off winners; (P) Promoted

=== FA Cup ===
FA Cup match details
Round	Date	Opponents	Venue	Result	Score F–A	Scorers	Attendance	Ref
Fourth round qualifying	27 October 2002	Bath City	A	D	1–1	Lockwood	3,470	
Fourth round qualifying replay	29 October 2002	Bath City	H	W	3–1	Demba (2), McIndoe	4,393	
First round proper	16 November 2002	Cheltenham Town	H	L	0–2		6,455	

=== FA Trophy ===
FA Trophy match details
Round	Date	Opponents	Venue	Result	Score F–A	Scorers	Attendance	Ref
Third round	14 January 2003	Hereford United	A	W	2–1	Pluck, Lockwood	2,425	
Fourth round	1 February 2003	Morecambe	H	W	2–1	Jackson, Skiverton	3,984	
Fifth round	22 February 2003	Northwich Victoria	H	W	2–1	Lockwood, Gall	4,469	
Sixth round	15 March 2003	Burscough	H	L	0–2		4,934	

=== Football League Trophy ===
Football League Trophy match details
Round	Date	Opponents	Venue	Result	Score F–A	Scorers	Attendance	Ref
First round	23 October 2002	Boston United	A	L	2–4	Skiverton, Alford	1,323	

=== Somerset Premier Cup ===
Somerset Premier Cup match details
Round	Date	Opponents	Venue	Result	Score F–A	Scorers	Attendance	Ref
Second round	19 November 2002	Mangotsfield United	H	W	2–1^{[B]}	Demba (2)	525	
Third round	18 February 2003	Odd Down	H	W	2–1	Grant (2)	341	
Semi-final	8 April 2003	Clevedon Town	A	W	4–0	Crittenden (2), Giles, Grant	283	
Final	29 April 2003	Taunton Town	N^{[C]}	L	1–2	Aggrey	914	

== Squad statistics ==
Numbers in parentheses denote appearances as substitute.
Players with squad numbers struck through and marked † left the club during the playing season.
Players with names in italics and marked * were on loan from another club for the whole of their season with Yeovil.
Players listed with no appearances have been in the matchday squad but only as unused substitutes.
Key to positions: GK – Goalkeeper; DF – Defender; MF – Midfielder; FW – Forward

No.	Pos.	Nat.	Name	Apps	Goals	Apps	Goals	Apps	Goals	Apps	Goals	Apps	Goals	Yellow card	Red card
No.	Pos.	Nat.	Name	League		FA Cup		FA Trophy		FL Trophy		Total		Discipline	
1	GK	ENG	Chris Weale	34	0	3	0	4	0	0	0	41	0	1	1
2	DF	ENG	Adam Lockwood	37 (4)	3	2	1	4	2	1	0	44 (4)	6	9	1
~~3~~ †	DF	ENG	Anthony Tonkin	7	0	0	0	0	0	0	0	7	0	0	0
~~3~~ †	MF	ENG	Jason Blunt *	0 (1)	0	0	0	0	0	0	0	0 (1)	0	0	0
4	DF	ENG	Terry Skiverton	34 (3)	7	3	0	3	1	1	1	41 (3)	9	8	1
5	DF	ENG	Colin Pluck	31 (5)	2	1	0	4	1	1	0	36 (5)	3	14	1
6	MF	ENG	Darren Way	40	1	3	0	4	0	1	0	48	1	6	0
7	FW	ENG	Adam Stansfield	1	0	0	0	0	0	0	0	1	0	0	0
8	MF	ENG	Lee Johnson	41	4	2	0	4	0	1	0	48	4	2	1
~~9~~ †	FW	ENG	Carl Alford	3 (11)	0	0 (3)	0	0	0	0 (1)	1	3 (15)	1	0	0
9	FW	WAL	Kevin Gall	11 (2)	13	0	0	2	1	0	0	13 (2)	14	0	1
10	MF	ENG	Nick Crittenden	30 (5)	9	3	0	1 (1)	0	1	0	35 (6)	9	3	0
11	MF	SCO	Michael McIndoe	41	12	3	1	4	0	1	0	49	13	5	1
12	FW	WAL	Chris Giles	0 (7)	1	1 (1)	0	0	0	0	0	1 (8)	1	1	0
13	GK	ENG	Jon Sheffield	7 (1)	0	0	0	0	0	1	0	8 (1)	0	0	0
14	DF	IRL	Roy O'Brien	20 (13)	0	3	0	1 (1)	0	1	0	25 (14)	0	0	0
15	DF	ENG	Stephen Reed	0 (1)	0	0	0	0	0	0	0	0 (1)	0	0	0
16	MF	ENG	Andy Lindegaard	13 (14)	6	1 (1)	0	2 (1)	0	1	0	17 (16)	6	1	0
17	DF	ENG	Tom White	2	0	0	0	0	0	0	0	2	0	0	0
18	FW	GHA	Kim Grant	6 (7)	1	1 (1)	0	0 (3)	0	0 (1)	0	7 (12)	1	2	0
~~19~~ †	FW	MLI	Abdoulaye Demba	11 (6)	6	2 (1)	2	0	0	1	0	14 (7)	8	2	1
20	MF	WAL	Gavin Williams	38	6	2	0	4	0	1	0	45	6	10	0
21	MF	ENG	Steve Thompson	0	0	0	0	0	0	0	0	0	0	0	0
22	GK	ENG	Steve Collis	1	0	0	0	0	0	0	0	1	0	0	0
~~23~~ †	FW	ENG	Howard Forinton	11 (3)	4	2 (1)	0	0	0	0	0	13 (4)	4	1	0
23	MF	ENG	Neil Mustoe	2 (1)	0	0	0	0	0	0	0	2 (1)	0	2	0
24	GK	ENG	Luke Buckingham	0	0	0	0	0	0	0	0	0	0	0	0
24	DF	MAR	Abdou El-Kholti	15 (12)	3	1	0	3 (1)	0	0 (1)	0	19 (14)	3	2	0
25	FW	ENG	Kirk Jackson	23	19	0	0	4	1	0	0	27	20	0	0
26	DF	ENG	Jimmy Aggrey	2 (6)	0	0	0	0	0	0	0	2 (6)	0	1	0

Players not included in matchday squads
No.	Pos.	Nat.	Name
—	MF	KEN	Faisal Mali

== Footnotes ==
A. Until the 24 September 2012, Yeovil played all of their home matches at Dorchester Town's The Avenue Stadium due to the relaying of the Huish Park pitch.
B. After extra time.
C. Final played at The Hand Stadium home of Clevedon Town.

== See also ==
- 2002–03 in English football
- List of Yeovil Town F.C. seasons
