= 2002 FA Trophy final =

2002 FA Trophy Final
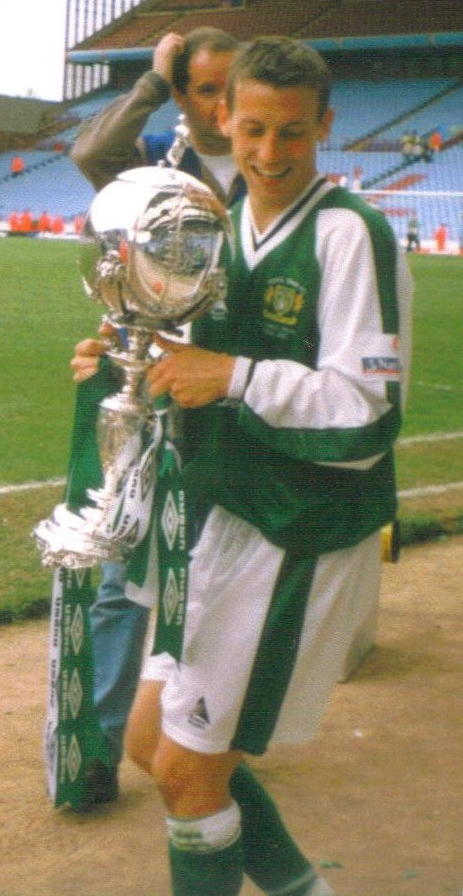
- Adam Stansfield, who scored one of Yeovil's goals in the final, with the trophy
- Event: 2001–02 FA Trophy
| Stevenage Borough | Yeovil Town |
| 0 | 2 |
- Date: 12 May 2002
- Venue: Villa Park, Birmingham
- Man of the Match: Adam Stansfield
- Referee: Neale Barry
- Attendance: 18,809

The 2002 FA Trophy Final was the 33rd final of the Football Association's cup competition for levels 5–8 of the English football league system. The match was contested by Stevenage Borough and Yeovil Town on 12 May 2002 at Villa Park in Birmingham.

Yeovil won the match 2–0 to win the competition for the first time in their history.

== Match ==
=== Details ===
12 May 2002
12:00 BST

| Stevenage Borough | 0–2 | Yeovil Town |
|---|---|---|
| | Report | Alford 12'; Stansfield 66' |

Villa Park, Birmingham
Attendance: 18,809
Referee: Neale Barry

| Stevenage Borough | Yeovil Town |

| GK | 1 | (England) Paul Wilkerson |
| RB | 2 | (England) John Hamsher |
| CB | 4 | (England) Robin Trott |
| CB | 5 | (England) Stuart Fraser |
| LB | 3 | (England) Jason Goodliffe |
| RM | 7 | (England) Simon Wormull | (substituted off) 71' |
| CM | 6 | (England) Matt Fisher |
| CM | 8 | (England) Sean Evers | (substituted off) 56' |
| LM | 11 | (England) Adrian Clarke |
| FW | 9 | (England) Kirk Jackson |
| FW | 10 | (France) Jean-Michel Sigere | (substituted off) 74' |
Substitutes:
| DF | 12 | (England) Jude Stirling | (substituted on) 71' |
| GK | 13 | (England) Dean Greygoose |
| FW | 14 | (England) DJ Campbell |
| MF | 15 | (England) Jamie Campbell | (substituted on) 74' |
| FW | 16 | (England) Martin Williams | (substituted on) 56' |
Manager:
(England) Wayne Turner

| GK | 1 | (England) Chris Weale |
| RB | 2 | (England) Adam Lockwood |
| CB | 4 | (England) Terry Skiverton (c) |
| CB | 5 | (England) Colin Pluck | (substituted off) 51' |
| LB | 3 | (England) Anthony Tonkin |
| RM | 10 | (England) Nick Crittenden | (substituted off) 83' |
| CM | 8 | (England) Lee Johnson |
| CM | 6 | (England) Darren Way |
| LM | 11 | (Scotland) Michael McIndoe |
| FW | 7 | (England) Adam Stansfield |
| FW | 9 | (England) Carl Alford | (substituted off) 86' |
Substitutes:
| DF | 12 | (England) Tom White | (substituted on) 51' |
| GK | 13 | (England) Jon Sheffield |
| DF | 14 | (Republic of Ireland) Roy O'Brien |
| MF | 15 | (Wales) Chris Giles | (substituted on) 86' |
| MF | 16 | (England) Andy Lindegaard | (substituted on) 83' |
Manager:
(England) Gary Johnson
