= List of Stevenage F.C. managers =

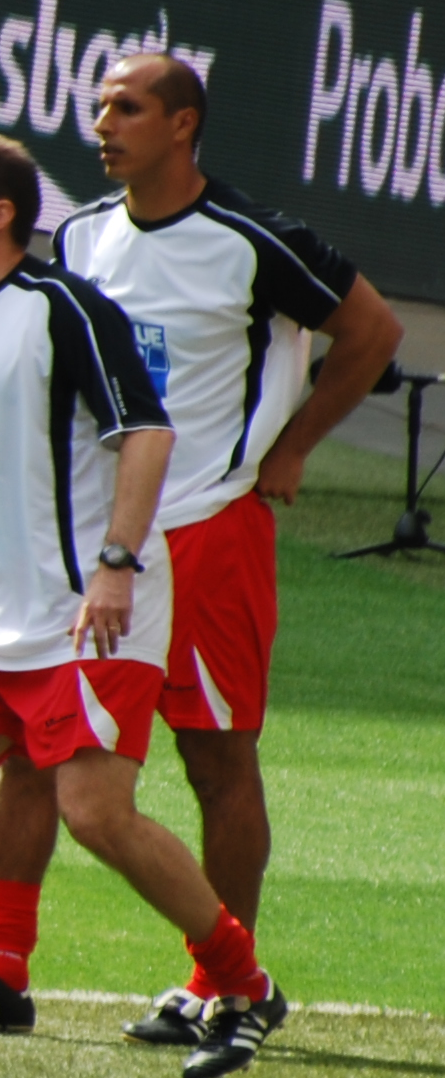
Dino Maamria, who was previously assistant manager under Graham Westley, returned to Stevenage as manager during the 2017–18 season.

Stevenage Football Club is an English association football club based in Stevenage, Hertfordshire. The team competes in League One, the third tier of English football. Since its formation in 1976, the club has had 18 permanent managers. The most recent appointee is Alex Revell, who was appointed manager in May 2024.

Victor Folbigg served as the club's first manager, though during his tenure the club had not yet achieved senior status. Derek Montgomery, already part of the coaching staff, became the first senior manager in 1980 and oversaw the transition from intermediate to senior competition. The longest-serving manager is Paul Fairclough, who held the position between 1990 and 1998, guiding Stevenage to three promotions and the Football Conference title in 1995–96, although the club was denied promotion to the Football League.

Stevenage won their first national cup competition in 2007, when Mark Stimson led the team to victory in the FA Trophy final, the first competitive match staged at the new Wembley Stadium. Graham Westley, across four separate spells, became the club's first Football League manager, having secured the Conference Premier title in the 2009–10 season, followed by promotion to League One via the play-offs the following season. Steve Evans guided Stevenage to promotion from League Two during the 2022–23 season, before departing in 2024.

The following list presents the statistical record of all individuals who have managed Stevenage, in chronological order. Each entry includes the manager's dates of tenure, overall competitive record, and any honours, promotions, or significant achievements. Both permanent and caretaker managers are included.

== Managerial history ==
=== 1976–1990 ===
The club was formed in 1976 following the demise of the town's former club, Stevenage Athletic. Prior to attaining senior status, the newly formed club was initially managed by Victor Folbigg. Folbigg guided the team to two Eastern Counties Youth Cup titles during his time as manager. He was replaced by Derek Montgomery in 1979, who was already part of the existing management team. Montgomery oversaw the club's transition from intermediate to senior status and managed the club's first senior match in the United Counties League in 1980. He helped guide the club to the United Counties League Division One championship, as well as the United Counties League Cup, in their first season.

Frank Cornwell took charge in July 1983. Cornwell was making the step up to first-team manager having joined the club during the 1982–83 season as reserve team manager. He remained in the role for four years, guiding the team to the Isthmian League Division Two North title during the 1985–86 season. Cornwell tendered his resignation as manager ahead of the 1987–88 season following a poor end to the previous season. Although the club persuaded him to remain, he ultimately resigned from the role in September 1987; a matchday programme at the time of his departure stated he had been a "victim of his own success". John Bailey was named as Cornwell's replacement, with the club being relegated back to the Isthmian Division Two North during his one season as manager. Brian Williams was tasked with steadying the club following the relegation and was appointed as manager in July 1988. He spent two full seasons in charge, guiding Stevenage to two fourth-place finishes.

=== 1990–2008 ===
Paul Fairclough, departing from Hertford Town, was appointed as the club's manager in June 1990, and his arrival proved to be a turning point in the club's history. The club won Division Two North during Fairclough's first season as manager, winning 34 of their 42 games, including every match played at home, scoring 122 goals and amassing 107 points. Back-to-back promotions were achieved a year later as the team won the Isthmian League Division One title. Stevenage then secured promotion to the Football Conference in 1994, meaning the club had earned promotion three times in four seasons. Two seasons later, they won the Conference under Fairclough's management but were denied promotion due to insufficient ground facilities.

Fairclough remained as the club's manager until December 1998, having also guided the club to the first round of the FA Cup for the first time, as well as two notable FA Cup ties against Newcastle United during the 1997–98 season. He took charge of 509 matches during his first spell with the club, which remains a club record for games managed in a single spell. His win percentage of 56.58% is also the highest of any Stevenage manager. When Fairclough departed, Richard Hill took over the club in third place in the Conference. The club ultimately finished in sixth during the 1998–99 season. Hill was sacked in April 2000 following a poor run of form, and Steve Wignall took charge for the remainder of the 2000–01 season. Wignall left the club after just eight games to become manager of Doncaster Rovers.

Following Wignall's departure, Fairclough returned for a second spell. He spent a year and a half in charge before leaving midway through the 2001–02 season. Fairclough was replaced by Wayne Turner, who had previously been assistant manager at Peterborough United. Turner helped guide the club to the FA Trophy final, having taken over when the club was at the quarter-final stage, where they would lose to Yeovil Town at Villa Park. With the club occupying last place in the Conference league table, Turner was sacked in December 2002. A month later, Graham Westley, formerly manager at Farnborough Town, was named as manager. Westley helped guide the club to safety, having signed seven players from his former club. During his first spell, Westley came close to guiding the club to the Football League in the 2004–05 season, losing in the Conference play-off final to Carlisle United in May 2005. He left a year later when his contract expired.

Replacing Westley was Mark Stimson, who had left fellow Conference team Grays Athletic. Stimson had the team playing an attacking style of football and helped guide the club to its first honours in a decade when they won the FA Trophy at the first competitive match at the new Wembley Stadium in May 2007. It was the first time that Stevenage had won a national cup competition. With the team near the top of the Conference league table in the opening months of the 2007–08 season, Stimson left to join Gillingham. He was replaced by former England caretaker manager Peter Taylor, who was tasked with helping guide the club into the Football League. The club ultimately fell out of the play-off positions, and Taylor left at the end of the season.

=== 2008– ===
Westley returned for a second spell in May 2008. Whilst his appointment was met with scepticism by some Stevenage supporters, he stated he had come to "finish the job he started", referring to guiding the club into the Football League for the first time in its history. Westley's first season back at the club began slowly, but a club record 24-match unbeaten run ensured Stevenage qualified for the play-offs, ultimately losing at the semi-final stage. That season, they won the FA Trophy, marking the start of a successful period for the club. Westley guided Stevenage into the Football League after the team won the Conference Premier title during the 2009–10 season, also finishing as FA Trophy runners-up that season. This made Westley Stevenage's first manager in the Football League. He helped guide the team to back-to-back promotions to League One after the club secured promotion via the play-offs in May 2011. With the club in the League One play-off places in January 2012, Westley left to join divisional rivals Preston North End. Former Colorado Rapids manager Gary Smith was appointed as Westley's replacement later that month, helping the club reach the play-off semi-final that season. In doing so, he guided the club to their highest league finish.

Despite Stevenage being in the top six of League One midway through the 2012–13 season, a run of 14 losses from 18 matches from December 2012 saw the club fall closer to the relegation places just three months later. Smith was subsequently sacked in March 2013 and replaced by Westley, who returned for his third spell at the club. Stevenage were relegated back into League Two during the 2013–14 season after finishing in last place in League One. The team lost in the play-off semi-finals in their first season back in League Two. The club opted against offering Westley a new contract and replaced him with Teddy Sheringham, who was undertaking his first managerial role. Sheringham was sacked in February 2016, with the club positioned in 19th. First-team coach Darren Sarll took caretaker charge for the remainder of the season and was appointed to the role on a permanent basis after helping the club secure League Two safety. With Stevenage in 16th place during the 2017–18 season, Sarll was sacked in March 2018; Wallace stating that the club "had not seen the progress expected" since making a number of signings during the January transfer window. Former player and first-team coach Dino Maamria replaced Sarll as manager.

Stevenage started the 2019–20 season without a win in the opening month and Maamria was subsequently sacked in September 2019. First-team coach Mark Sampson took caretaker charge, but with the club in 23rd place after several months under his management, Westley returned for a fourth spell in December 2019. Two months later, Westley resigned and was replaced by Alex Revell, who had previously served as player-coach at the club. Revell managed the club for 77 matches, with the team finishing in 14th position in League Two in his one full season as manager. With Stevenage in 21st place three months into the 2021–22 season, Revell left the club. Paul Tisdale was appointed as manager on 29 November 2021. After winning three of his 21 matches as manager, Tisdale left the club on 16 March 2022. Steve Evans was appointed as the club's new manager on the same day. The club won four of their final nine matches under Evans to avoid relegation and finish in 21st position. Under Evans' management the following season, Stevenage earned promotion to League One after finishing in second in League Two. Evans departed for Rotherham United towards the end of the 2023–24 season and was succeeded by returning manager Alex Revell. Under Revell, Stevenage recorded their joint-highest Football League finish in the 2025–26 season, finishing sixth in League One, before losing to Stockport County in the play-off semi-finals.

== Managers ==
All competitive first-team matches in national competitions are included.

- Caretaker managers are denoted in italics.
- Permanent managers who previously played for the club are marked ^{P}.
- Win percentage is rounded to two decimal places.

Statistics are correct as of 22 August 2026.

Key

P: Matches played W: Matches won D: Matches drawn L: Matches lost

Table of Stevenage managers, including tenure, record and honours
Name	Nationality	From	To	P	W	D	L	Win %	Honours
Derek Montgomery ^{P}	England	1979	June 1983	149	67	31	51	44.97	United Counties Division One champions: 1980–81; United Counties League Cup winners: 1980–81
Frank Cornwell ^{P}	England	July 1983	September 1987	277	130	51	96	46.93	Isthmian League Division Two North champions: 1985–86
John Bailey	England	September 1987	May 1988	39	11	7	21	28.21	
Brian Williams	England	July 1988	May 1990	118	61	32	25	51.69	
Paul Fairclough	England	June 1990	17 December 1998	509	288	90	131	56.58	Isthmian League Division Two North champions: 1990–91; Isthmian League Division One champions: 1991–92; Isthmian League Premier Division champions: 1993–94; Conference National champions: 1995–96
Richard Hill	England	21 December 1998	16 April 2000	58	23	16	19	39.66	
Steve Wignall	England	18 April 2000	28 May 2000	8	3	3	2	37.50	
Paul Fairclough	England	31 May 2000	26 February 2002	85	31	29	25	36.47	
Wayne Turner	England	27 February 2002	27 December 2002	45	15	7	23	33.33	FA Trophy runners-up: 2001–02
John Dreyer	England	January 2003	28 January 2003	4	3	1	0	75.00	
Graham Westley	England	29 January 2003	30 June 2006	166	77	35	54	46.39	
Mark Stimson	England	1 July 2006	17 October 2007	72	38	13	21	52.78	FA Trophy winners: 2006–07
Peter Taylor	England	1 November 2007	28 April 2008	32	14	4	14	43.75	
Graham Westley	England	2 May 2008	12 January 2012	201	109	49	43	54.23	FA Trophy winners: 2008–09; Conference Premier champions: 2009–10; FA Trophy runners-up: 2009–10; League Two play-off winners: 2010–11
Mark Roberts	England	13 January 2012	25 January 2013	3	2	1	0	66.67	
Gary Smith	England	25 January 2012	20 March 2013	67	22	19	26	32.84	
Mark Roberts	England	20 March 2012	30 March 2013	2	0	1	1	0.00	
Graham Westley	England	30 March 2013	31 May 2015	112	38	25	49	33.93	
Teddy Sheringham	England	1 June 2015	1 February 2016	33	7	10	16	21.21	
Darren Sarll	England	1 February 2016	18 March 2018	114	41	26	47	35.96	
Dino Maamria ^{P}	Tunisia	20 March 2018	9 September 2019	69	24	15	30	34.78	
Mark Sampson	Wales	9 September 2019	22 December 2019	19	4	9	6	21.05	
Graham Westley	England	23 December 2019	16 February 2020	15	2	3	10	13.33	
Alex Revell ^{P}	England	16 February 2020	15 November 2021	77	20	30	27	25.97	
Robbie O'Keefe	England	16 November 2021	28 November 2021	3	1	2	0	33.33	
Paul Tisdale	England	29 November 2021	16 March 2022	21	3	8	10	14.29	
Steve Evans	Scotland	16 March 2022	17 April 2024	120	57	33	30	47.50	EFL League Two runners-up: 2022–23
Alex Revell ^{P}	England	5 May 2024		114	44	28	42	38.60	
