= Abdoulaye Demba =

Malian footballer

Personal information
- Date of birth: 2 November 1976 (age 50)
- Place of birth: Antwerp, Belgium
- Height: 1.87 m (6 ft 2 in)
- Position: Forward

Senior career*
Years	Team	Apps	(Gls)
1996–1998	K. Beerschot V.A.C.	31	(2)
1998–2001	Al Khaleej Club		
2001–2002	K.V. Oostende	29	(14)
2002–2003	Yeovil Town	17	(6)
2003	K.V. Oostende	12	(7)
2003–2005	Eendracht Aalst	36	(18)
2005–2006	Ethnikos Asteras	25	(5)
2006	IR Tanger		
2006–2007	Stade Lavallois	18	(0)
2007–2009	Maghreb Fez		
2011–2013	KSC City Pirates		

International career
2003–2006	Mali	7	(1)
- * Club domestic league appearances and goals

Abdoulaye Demba (also Abdoulai Demba; born 2 November 1976) is a Malian former professional footballer who played as a forward.

== Club career ==
On 1 July 2002, Demba signed for English club Yeovil Town on a one-year contract with the option for a second, after being top scorer for K.V. Oostende in the Belgian third division (9 goals in 15 games). He had briefly been on trial at Yeovil in the previous season.

He made his debut for the Conference club on 17 August 2002 in a 2–2 draw with Gravesend & Northfleet at Huish Park. He came on as a 16th-minute substitute for Adam Stansfield, who had suffered a serious injury. With Stansfield ruled out long-term, Demba made his first start three days later in a 2–1 defeat at Barnet, playing 70 minutes before being replaced by Chris Giles.

On 14 September, he scored his first goal for the club to rescue a 2–2 draw away at Stevenage Borough, having been brought on at half time in place of Anthony Tonkin by manager Gary Johnson and heading in a cross by Lee Johnson. A week later in a 3–0 home win over Halifax Town, he was brought down for a penalty by opposing goalkeeper Lee Butler, resulting in a red card, but was himself sent off for foul and abusive language, and his teammate Terry Skiverton also dismissed. He scored five further goals in the season, all in the next three games: one in a 4–0 win over Woking three days later, a first-half hat-trick in a 6–0 win against Southport on 5 October, and the opener in a 1–1 draw at Burton Albion three days after that. He was Football Conference Goalscorer of the Month in October 2002. Yeovil won the Conference, earning promotion to The Football League for the first time.

== International career ==
Demba represented Mali at the 2004 Africa Cup of Nations in Tunisia. His first appearance came in their second group game on 30 January, a 3–1 win over Burkina Faso, replacing Soumaila Coulibaly in added time. Three days later he started in place of Coulibaly, in a 1–1 draw with Senegal. Mali eventually came fourth.
