= Adam Stansfield =

English footballer (1978–2010)

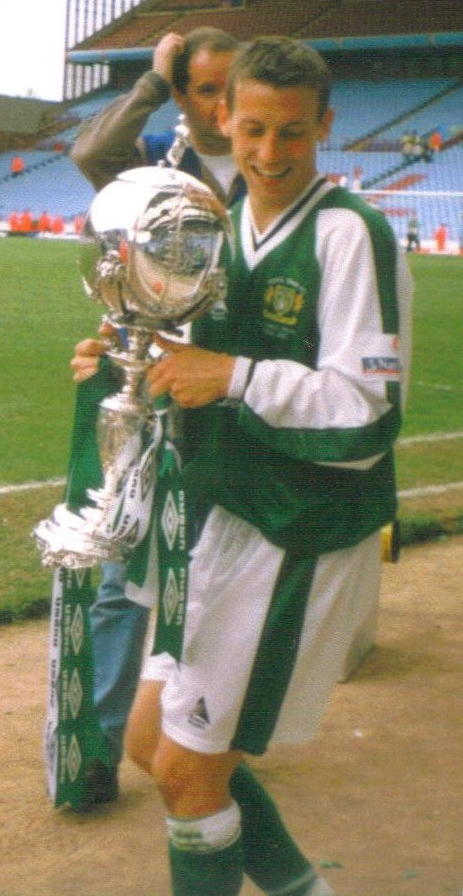
- Stansfield holding the FA Trophy following Yeovil's victory in 2002

Personal information
- Full name: Adam Stansfield
- Date of birth: 10 September 1978
- Place of birth: Plymouth, England
- Date of death: 10 August 2010 (aged 31)
- Place of death: Exeter, England
- Height: 5 ft 9 in (1.75 m)
- Position: Striker

Youth career
- Tiverton Town

Senior career*
Years	Team	Apps	(Gls)
- Cullompton Rangers
2000–2001	Elmore		
2001–2004	Yeovil Town	55	(14)
2004–2006	Hereford United	62	(25)
2006–2010	Exeter City	142	(37)
Total		259+	(76+)

International career
2002–2005	England C	5	(1)
- * Club domestic league appearances and goals

Adam Stansfield (10 September 1978 – 10 August 2010) was an English professional footballer who played as a striker. He competed professionally for Yeovil Town, Hereford United and Exeter City, and won promotion from the Football Conference to The Football League with all three teams.

Having played for three counties as a child, Stansfield began his career in non-league with Cullompton Rangers and Elmore, and had unsuccessful trials at league teams. At the age of 23, he signed his first professional contract with Yeovil Town, after impressing their manager Gary Johnson in a match against them. In his first season, he helped them win the FA Trophy, scoring in the 2002 final. The following season, Yeovil won the Conference and promotion into The Football League, although Stansfield was ruled out with a broken leg in the first game. In 2004, he transferred to Hereford United, where he won promotion to The Football League via the 2006 play-offs, and repeated the feat with Exeter City two years later. He also helped Exeter earn promotion into League One in 2009. At international level, Stansfield played five matches and scored one goal for England's national semi-professional team, winning the 2005 Four Nations Tournament.

Stansfield was diagnosed with colorectal cancer in April 2010. He returned to training after surgery and chemotherapy, but died on 10 August that year. A foundation in his name was posthumously set up by his family to provide sporting opportunities and raise awareness of colorectal cancer. He has posthumously been featured on a Flybe airliner livery and a local currency banknote in Exeter.

== Early and personal life ==
Stansfield was born in Plymouth, Devon, as the third of four children, and supported Nottingham Forest. On 2 June 2001 he married Marie, with whom he had three sons. By the 2019–20 season, his son Jay was scoring regularly for Fulham's Under 18 team, and in 2022 joined Exeter on loan from the Craven Cottage side, wearing number 9, the shirt number synonymous with his father's legacy at the club. He made his debut as a substitute during Exeter's 1–0 victory over MK Dons. Devon journalist Gary Andrews remembered Stansfield senior as a man who would spend time with his family after matches while speaking to fans and the press. He wrote that "I had the pleasure of interviewing Adam on a regular basis... I say pleasure, because his answers were thoughtful and intelligent and he came across as a man who was delighted to be back home with his friends and family."

== Career ==
=== Early career ===
Stansfield's first club was Evesham Colts under-10s. He played at county level for Worcestershire, Leicestershire and Devon. When his family settled back in Devon he joined Twyford Spartans, scoring 84 goals in 54 matches. He played in Tiverton Town's youth team as a left back before reverting to being a striker at his first senior club, non-League side Cullompton Rangers. He later moved to Elmore, where he attracted trials from Exeter City, Wolverhampton Wanderers and Torquay United, all of which were unsuccessful. His siblings joined the Royal Air Force and he thought of joining them, but continued searching for a breakthrough in professional football.

=== Yeovil Town ===
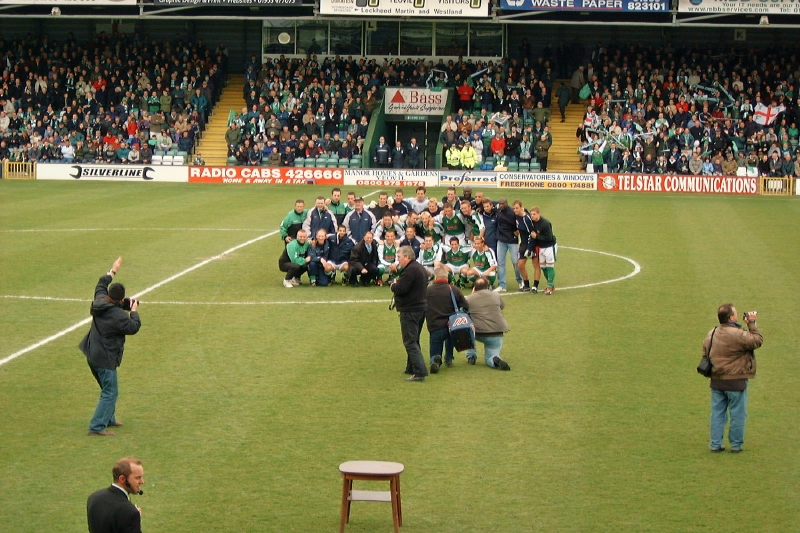
Yeovil Town celebrating their promotion to The Football League at Huish Park, 19 April 2003

In October 2001, Stansfield's performances for Elmore impressed Yeovil Town manager Gary Johnson to sign him. He made his debut in the Conference on 9 November, playing the entirety of a 3–0 loss away to Southport. His first goal came on 1 December, concluding a 3–1 victory at Northwich Victoria. His first season at Huish Park was a success, finishing as the top scorer with 16 goals, eight of which came in the club's victorious FA Trophy run. He scored twice in a fourth round replay at Doncaster Rovers, as Yeovil came from 0–3 down for an eventual 5–4 victory. In the final on 12 May he scored the second goal of a 2–0 win over Stevenage Borough at the Villa Park, Birmingham.

On the first day of the following season, Stansfield was substituted through injury after 16 minutes of an eventual 2–2 home draw with Gravesend & Northfleet to be replaced by Abdoulai Demba. It was later confirmed to be a break of the tibia and fibula. He missed the remainder of the season, in which Yeovil won the Conference to be promoted to The Football League for the first time.

He recovered to feature in the next campaign, making his league debut on 16 August 2003. In that match, Yeovil's first home match in The Football League, he came on as an 80th-minute substitute for Kirk Jackson in a 3–0 win against Carlisle United. His first of six goals in the Third Division season came on 6 September, opening a 2–0 home win over Swansea City. He was given a rare start in that match as first-choice forward Kevin Gall was away with Wales under-21.

=== Hereford United ===
On 14 June 2004, Stansfield returned to the Conference with Hereford United, signed by Graham Turner to replace their previous season's top scorer Steve Guinan, who had been sold to Cheltenham Town. He scored 20 goals across the season, including two on 25 March 2005 in a 6–0 win at Farnborough Town. In that match, he came on in the 77th minute for Daniel Carey-Bertram, who had also scored two. Hereford reached the promotion play-offs, where they lost in the semi-finals to Stevenage. In the following season they won promotion by the play-offs, with Stansfield starting in the final on 20 May 2006 at the Walkers Stadium in Leicester, a 3–2 extra-time victory over Halifax Town.

=== Exeter City ===
On 12 June 2006, with his contract expired, Stansfield decided to remain in the Conference, joining Exeter City. He told local radio that his aim was not to achieve promotion or reach a certain tally of goals, but to influence the club's younger players.

He scored nine times in 40 league games in his first season, including two in a 2–1 home win over relegated Southport on 28 April 2007 in order to seal a play-off place. Eleven days later, in the second leg of the play-off semi-final away to Oxford United, he scored a goal which took the match to extra time and eventually a penalty shootout which his side won. In the final on 20 May at Wembley Stadium, he came on as a 36th-minute substitute for goalscorer Lee Phillips in a 1–2 loss to Morecambe.

On 26 April 2008, Stansfield scored in Exeter's 4–4 draw at Burton Albion which qualified them for that season's play-offs. He started in the final, whereby the team returned to The Football League for the first time in five years with a 1–0 Wembley win over Cambridge United.

He scored 10 goals in 37 league games as they won a second consecutive promotion into League One in the 2008–09 season. This included consecutive braces on 27 September and 4 October, in wins over Macclesfield Town (4–1 away) and Gillingham (3–0 home). The following campaign, despite never having previously played at as high a level, he was a regular starter for Exeter in League One, scoring eight goals in a season curtailed by his cancer diagnosis.

=== International career ===
Stansfield earned five caps and scored one goal for the England national semi-professional team. He featured in the 2002 edition of the Four Nations Tournament, and made his debut in England's opening match, a 1–1 draw with Wales at York Street in Boston on 14 May. Stansfield was injured in the first half of the last match, a 2–0 win against Scotland at Rockingham Road in Kettering on 18 May, while Wales won the title. In 2005, while back in the Conference with Hereford, he was again called up for the tournament by manager Paul Fairclough. Stansfield played in two matches as England won the tournament with three wins.

== Illness and death ==
Stansfield suffered from persistent abdominal pain in the early part of 2010, and was admitted to hospital for tests at the end of March. On 8 April 2010, Exeter City confirmed to the media that he had been diagnosed with colorectal cancer. Manager Paul Tisdale told local news programme BBC Spotlight that "there's little good on this subject... but if there's someone who can deal with it and meet it head on with real purpose, Adam's the man".

Later that month, Stansfield underwent surgery to remove part of his colon. Club vice-chairman Julian Tagg reported that the operation was successful, and that Stansfield appeared happy and was making jokes. He joined the Exeter squad for the first day of pre-season training in July, appearing weak from chemotherapy. His condition deteriorated rapidly and he died on 10 August in Exeter, with his death being announced shortly after Exeter's loss to Ipswich Town in the League Cup.

As a mark of respect, Dagenham & Redbridge postponed the game Exeter were due to play against them at Victoria Road four days after his death. Exeter retired his shirt number 9 for nine seasons. His son, Jay Stansfield, wore the number 9 shirt for Exeter City, when he was on loan from Fulham in the 2022–23 season.

Stansfield's body was taken from St James Park to his funeral service at Exeter Cathedral on 25 August, attended by more than 1,000 mourners. A private family service was held later.

=== Posthumous recognition ===
At his funeral, Stansfield's widow Marie had an idea to set up the Adam Stansfield Foundation, which by the fourth anniversary of his death had raised over £150,000. It works in offering children football in Devon, Somerset and Herefordshire, the three counties in which he played professionally, as well as increasing opportunities for the disabled to take part in the sport. The foundation also aims to increase awareness of bowel cancer.

Stansfield continues to be remembered by fans of his former teams. On 9 August 2014, as Exeter started the new season against Portsmouth, a giant flag resembling his club shirt was displayed by the crowd. Hereford, the phoenix club of Hereford United, gave a minute's applause to Stansfield in the ninth minute – his number for the Bulls — in the 2016 FA Vase Final. Exeter and Yeovil agreed that on their meeting at St James Park on 8 August 2015, there would be a minute's applause in the seventh minute and ninth, for the numbers he wore at each club. Earlier the same day, there was also a match between the two clubs' supporters in Topsham, Devon, to raise funds for his foundation.

In March 2011, Elmore named their new stand at Horsdon Park after Stansfield, ahead of a game against Hengrove Athletic. The match attracted over 100 fans, ahead of a usual average of 35. From 2011 to 2015, an aeroplane belonging to Flybe bore an image of Stansfield, with other aeroplanes belonging to the company featuring such former footballers as George Best and Kevin Keegan. In 2015, Stansfield was featured on £5 Exeter Pound notes in the city. In recognition of his achievements at Exeter City, Stansfield was in 2017 inducted into the Exeter City Hall of Fame alongside Sidney Thomas, Graham Rees and Peter Hatch. In 2018 Exeter City named their new stand the Stagecoach Adam Stansfield Stand.

Stansfield‘s death and legacy is referenced in the Minnie Birch song Show Me the Way to Go Home.

== Career statistics ==
Appearances and goals by club, season and competition
Club	Season	League			FA Cup		League Cup		FA Trophy		Other		Total	
Club	Season	Division	Apps	Goals	Apps	Goals	Apps	Goals	Apps	Goals	Apps	Goals	Apps	Goals
Yeovil Town	2001–02	Football Conference	23	8	0	0	—		8	8	0	0	31	16
Yeovil Town	2002–03	Football Conference	1	0	0	0	—		0	0	0	0	1	0
Yeovil Town	2003–04	Third Division	31	6	2	0	0	0	—		2 (Note: Appearance(s) in Football League Trophy)	0	35	6
Yeovil Town	Total		55	14	2	0	0	0	8	8	2	0	67	22
Hereford United	2004–05	Conference National	39	19	3	1	—		4	1	8 (Note: One appearances and one goal in Football League Trophy, four appearances in Conference League Cup, two in Conference National play-offs, one appearance and two goals in Herefordshire Senior Cup)	3	54	24
Hereford United	2005–06	Conference National	23	6	1	0	—		3	2	8 (Note: Three appearances and one goal in Football League Trophy, three appearances in Conference National play-offs, two appearances and two goals in Herefordshire Senior Cup)	3	35	11
Hereford United	Total		62	25	4	1	0	0	7	3	16	6	89	35
Exeter City	2006–07	Conference National	38	9	1	0	—		1	0	3 (Note: Appearances in Conference National play-offs)	1	43	10
Exeter City	2007–08	Conference Premier	40	11	2	0	—		2	0	3	0	47	11
Exeter City	2008–09	League Two	37	10	1	0	1	0	—		1	0	40	10
Exeter City	2009–10	League One	27	7	2	1	0	0	—		1	0	30	8
Exeter City	Total		142	37	6	1	1	0	3	0	8	1	160	39
Career total			259	76	12	2	1	0	18	11	26	7	316	96

== Honours ==
Yeovil Town

- FA Trophy: 2001–02
- Football Conference: 2002–03

Hereford United

- Conference National play-offs: 2006

Exeter City

- Conference National play-offs: 2008

England semi-professional

- Four Nations Tournament: 2005
