= 1995–96 Football Conference =

Football Conference
- Season: 1995–96
- Champions: Stevenage Borough (1st Football Conference title)
- Promoted to the Football League: None
- Conference League Cup winners: Bromsgrove Rovers
- FA Trophy winners: Macclesfield Town
- Relegated to Level 6: Dagenham & Redbridge, Runcorn
- Matches: 462
- Goals: 1,384 (3 per match)
- Top goalscorer: (Jamaica) Barry Hayles (Stevenage Borough), 29
- Biggest home win: Macclesfield Town – Halifax Town 7–0 (9 March 1996); Morecambe – Altrincham 7–0 (17 February 1996)
- Biggest away win: Runcorn F.C. Halton – Stevenage Borough 0–8 (25 November 1995)
- Highest scoring: Slough Town – Kidderminster Harriers 5–4 (28 August 1995); Morecambe – Woking 4–5 (13 January 1997)
- Longest winning run: Woking, 7 matches
- Longest unbeaten run: Stevenage Borough, 17 matches
- Longest losing run: Dover Athletic, 9 matches
- Highest attendance: Woking v Macclesfield Town, 4,583 (6 April 1996)
- Lowest attendance: ?
- Average attendance: 1,054

The Football Conference season of 1995–96 was the seventeenth season of the Football Conference, also known as the Vauxhall Conference for sponsorship reasons.

== Overview ==
Stevenage Borough won the Conference championship during their second season in this league. However, they did not earn a promotion to the Football League because they did not meet Football League requirements. As of 2025, this is the last season when this happened.

== New teams in the league this season ==
- Hednesford Town (promoted 1994–95)
- Morecambe (promoted 1994–95)
- Slough Town (promoted 1994–95)

== Final league table ==
Pos	Team	Pld	W	D	L	GF	GA	GD	Pts	Qualification or relegation
1	Stevenage Borough (C)	42	27	10	5	101	44	+57	91	No promotion (Note: Stevenage Borough were denied promotion to the Football League Third Division due to failing to meet Football League ground requirements.)
2	Woking	42	25	8	9	83	54	+29	83	
3	Hednesford Town	42	23	7	12	71	46	+25	76	
4	Macclesfield Town	42	22	9	11	66	49	+17	75	
5	Gateshead	42	18	13	11	58	46	+12	67	
6	Southport	42	18	12	12	77	64	+13	66	
7	Kidderminster Harriers	42	18	10	14	78	66	+12	64	
8	Northwich Victoria	42	16	12	14	72	64	+8	60	
9	Morecambe	42	17	8	17	78	72	+6	59	
10	Farnborough Town	42	15	14	13	63	58	+5	59	
11	Bromsgrove Rovers	42	15	14	13	59	57	+2	59	
12	Altrincham	42	15	13	14	59	64	−5	58	
13	Telford United	42	15	10	17	51	56	−5	55	
14	Stalybridge Celtic	42	16	7	19	59	68	−9	55	
15	Halifax Town	42	13	13	16	49	63	−14	52	
16	Kettering Town	42	13	9	20	68	84	−16	48	
17	Slough Town	42	13	8	21	63	76	−13	47	
18	Bath City	42	13	7	22	45	66	−21	46	
19	Welling United	42	10	15	17	42	53	−11	45	
20	Dover Athletic	42	11	7	24	51	74	−23	40	Reprived from relegation (Note: Dover Athletic were reprived from relegation because Northern Premier League champions Bamber Bridge did not meet Conference ground requirements.)
21	Runcorn (R)	42	9	8	25	48	87	−39	35	Relegation to the Northern Premier League Premier Division
22	Dagenham & Redbridge (R)	42	7	12	23	43	73	−30	33	Relegation to the Isthmian League Premier Division

(C) Champions; (R) Relegated

== Results ==
Home \ Away	ALT	BAT	BRO	D&R	DOV	FAR	GAT	HAL	HED	KET	KID	MAC	MOR	NOR	RUN	SLO	SOU	STL	STB	TEL	WEL	WOK
Altrincham		1–2	3–0	3–1	2–2	2–2	1–1	3–2	2–1	1–3	1–1	0–4	3–0	3–4	2–2	0–1	1–0	1–0	0–2	1–0	1–0	2–0
Bath City	2–2		0–1	0–2	2–1	2–1	0–1	2–1	1–0	3–1	1–1	1–1	3–2	0–3	3–0	3–1	4–0	0–4	1–2	0–3	1–1	0–3
Bromsgrove Rovers	0–0	4–1		2–0	3–0	1–2	3–1	0–1	1–4	3–2	2–1	1–0	1–0	1–1	2–0	0–0	4–1	1–1	1–1	0–2	1–1	2–1
Dagenham & Redbridge	1–0	0–1	2–2		3–0	2–2	0–4	1–1	1–2	1–2	4–2	3–0	2–2	0–3	2–3	1–3	1–2	4–1	1–2	1–1	1–1	0–0
Dover Athletic	1–4	1–0	0–2	0–1		1–3	1–1	3–2	1–3	2–1	2–1	2–3	2–3	0–1	4–2	0–1	0–1	1–3	1–2	1–0	2–1	4–3
Farnborough Town	1–1	0–0	1–0	2–0	3–2		2–3	0–0	1–3	1–1	3–1	6–1	3–1	0–1	0–1	0–1	1–0	1–1	2–2	2–1	0–1	0–2
Gateshead	2–3	3–1	1–0	2–0	1–1	1–1		3–2	0–3	1–1	4–1	0–1	3–0	1–1	1–0	2–1	2–2	1–0	2–2	1–2	1–1	0–1
Halifax Town	1–1	3–1	1–1	3–0	1–0	0–0	2–0		1–3	2–0	0–2	1–0	1–1	2–0	1–3	1–2	2–2	2–3	2–3	0–0	2–1	2–2
Hednesford Town	2–1	2–1	4–2	0–0	2–2	4–1	0–1	3–0		1–0	1–3	0–1	1–2	2–1	2–0	3–1	2–1	0–1	2–1	4–0	1–1	2–1
Kettering Town	4–2	3–0	2–2	2–0	2–2	0–2	1–0	1–2	2–0		2–0	2–2	2–3	2–2	4–0	2–0	1–1	1–6	1–2	0–3	1–3	3–0
Kidderminster Harriers	1–1	1–2	1–0	5–1	1–1	3–3	1–1	6–1	3–1	1–0		0–4	4–2	2–1	4–1	4–3	2–3	3–0	0–1	2–0	3–0	2–0
Macclesfield Town	2–3	0–1	2–1	3–1	0–1	1–0	1–0	7–0	1–1	1–1	0–2		2–0	0–0	1–0	1–1	3–1	1–0	0–0	1–0	2–1	3–2
Morecambe	7–0	1–0	4–1	2–2	3–1	2–3	2–3	0–1	0–1	5–3	3–1	2–4		2–2	3–1	1–2	4–3	2–0	1–0	2–0	1–0	4–5
Northwich Victoria	2–1	2–2	2–2	1–0	1–2	1–3	1–2	1–1	0–2	6–2	5–2	1–2	2–1		4–3	0–3	1–2	1–0	1–3	2–0	1–2	3–0
Runcorn	0–1	1–0	0–0	2–0	1–3	0–3	1–1	0–1	2–2	4–2	0–1	0–0	1–3	3–4		4–3	1–1	0–1	0–8	2–3	1–3	2–3
Slough Town	1–2	1–1	2–3	5–0	3–2	1–1	1–2	2–3	0–2	1–2	5–4	2–2	1–1	1–1	0–1		2–5	2–1	2–6	1–2	0–0	2–3
Southport	1–2	2–1	1–2	2–1	0–0	7–1	1–0	0–0	2–2	6–1	0–2	2–1	1–1	2–2	1–1	2–0		5–3	0–1	3–2	2–0	2–2
Stalybridge Celtic	1–0	1–0	2–1	2–1	2–0	2–2	0–2	1–0	0–1	3–2	2–2	1–2	0–2	1–5	2–0	0–1	1–4		2–5	2–2	2–1	2–4
Stevenage Borough	1–1	2–0	3–3	1–0	3–2	0–0	1–1	2–0	1–0	5–1	4–1	4–0	1–1	5–1	4–1	3–1	1–3	2–2		0–1	4–1	4–0
Telford United	2–0	3–1	0–0	0–0	1–0	3–2	0–0	1–1	2–1	3–4	1–1	1–2	2–2	1–0	1–2	2–0	2–1	0–1	1–3		0–0	1–2
Welling United	1–1	2–1	5–2	0–0	1–0	0–1	1–2	0–0	1–1	1–0	0–0	1–2	1–0	1–1	1–1	0–3	0–1	1–1	0–3	3–1		1–2
Woking	2–0	2–0	1–1	2–2	1–0	2–1	2–0	2–0	3–0	1–1	0–0	3–2	3–0	0–0	2–1	3–0	4–0	2–1	4–1	5–1	3–2	

Updated to match(es) played on unknown. Source: Glenda Rollin (ed.), Jack Rollin (exec. ed.), Rothmans Football Yearbook 1996–97. Headline, 1996.
Legend: Blue = home team win; Yellow = draw; Red = away team win.
Locations of the Football Conference 1995–1996 teams
Locations of the Football Conference teams 1995–1996

== Promotion and relegation ==
=== Promoted ===
- Hayes (from the Isthmian League)
- Rushden & Diamonds (from the Southern Premier League)

=== Relegated ===
- Dagenham & Redbridge (to the Isthmian League)
- Runcorn (to the Northern Premier League)

== Top scorers in order of league goals ==
Rank	Player	Club	League	FA Cup	FA Trophy	League Cup	Total
1	(Jamaica) Barry Hayles	Stevenage Borough	29	0	5	1	35
2	(England) Joe O'Connor	Hednesford Town	23	1	0	2	26
3	(England) Carl Alford	Kettering Town	22	2	1	0	25
4	(England) Mark West	Slough Town	21	0	3	4	28
=	(England) Chris Boothe	Farnborough Town	21	5	1	5	32
6	(England) David Leworthy	Dover Athletic	20	1	1	3	25
7	(England) Steve Harkus	Gateshead	19	0	0	1	20
8	(England) Clive Walker	Woking	18	1	0	0	19
9	(Wales) Carwyn Williams	Northwich Victoria	17	3	0	0	20
10	(England) Andy Whittaker	Southport	16	0	1	3	20
11	(England) Corey Browne	Stevenage Borough	15	1	0	0	16
12	(England) Mike Bignall	Runcorn	14	2	0	0	16
=	(England) Brian Butler	Northwich Victoria	14	2	4	0	20
=	(England) Kim Casey	Kidderminster Harriers	14	1	0	2	17
=	(England) Paul Davies	Kidderminster Harriers	14	0	0	0	14
=	(England) Darran Hay	Woking	14	4	0	0	18
=	(England) Junior Hunter	Woking	14	0	0	0	14
