= Adam Lockwood =

English footballer (born 1981)

Personal information
- Full name: Adam Brian Lockwood
- Date of birth: 26 October 1981 (age 45)
- Place of birth: Wakefield, England
- Height: 6 ft 0 in (1.83 m)
- Position: Defender

Youth career
- 1997–1998: Leeds United
- 1998–1999: Reading

Senior career*
Years	Team	Apps	(Gls)
1999–2001	Reading	0	(0)
2000	→ Maidenhead United (loan)		
2001	→ Forest Green Rovers (loan)	10	(1)
2001	→ Yeovil Town (loan)	6	(0)
2001–2006	Yeovil Town	138	(7)
2005–2006	→ Torquay United (loan)	9	(3)
2006–2012	Doncaster Rovers	155	(8)
2012–2013	Bury	18	(1)
2013–2014	Guiseley	6	(0)
2014–2015	Oldham Athletic	31	(2)
2015–2017	Guiseley	28	(0)
Total		401	(22)

International career
2002-2003	England C	3	(0)

Managerial career
- 2016: Guiseley (caretaker)
- 2016–2017: Guiseley
- 2020–2022: Wakefield AFC
- * Club domestic league appearances and goals

Adam Brian Lockwood (born 26 October 1981) is an English former professional footballer who played as a defender.

== Career ==
Lockwood began his career as a trainee with Reading, after being released as a youth player by Leeds United. He turned professional in August 1999, but failed to break into the Reading first team and in 2000 joined Maidenhead United to gain first team experience. In February 2001 he joined Forest Green Rovers on loan until the end of the season. He appeared in the 2001 FA Trophy final for Forest Green but was on the losing side in a 1–0 defeat. In September 2001 he joined Yeovil Town on loan, a month later making the move permanent on a free transfer.

He was a member of the side that won the FA Trophy in May 2002, having been a runner up the year before with Forest Green, and helped Yeovil to the Conference and League Two titles. He struggled with injuries in the 2004–05 season, but signed a new one-year contract in August 2005. However, he struggled to re-establish himself and in November 2005, joined West Country rivals Torquay United on loan, returning to Yeovil in January 2006.

He moved to Doncaster Rovers in July 2006. Lockwood committed his future to the club by signing a 2-year extension to his contract at Rovers in the summer of 2010. On 18 May 2012, Doncaster Rovers confirmed that Lockwood would be released at the end of his contract having made 180 appearances scoring 8 goals.

On 4 July 2012, Lockwood signed for League One side Bury following his release from Doncaster. He made his home debut for Bury on 18 August 2012, in a 1–1 draw against Brentford. He scored his first goal for the club on 10 November 2012, in a 2–0 win at home against Portsmouth at Fratton Park.

On 25 September 2013, Lockwood was released by Bury after the two parties mutually agreed to terminate his contract.

The following month he joined Conference North side Guiseley. He made several appearances quickly becoming a favourite to the fans. After fantastic displays for The Lions he caught the attention of Oldham Athletic A.F.C. It was no surprise he had signed for a league club,

=== Oldham Athletic ===
Lockwood joined Oldham Athletic on 3 January 2014 until the end of the 2013–14 season. Lockwood made his debut for the club against Wolves on 28 January, coming on for the injured Genseric Kusunga in the 55th minute of the game.

Lockwood scored his first goal for the club in a game against M.K. Dons

Lockwood scored his second goal for the club in the last game of the season, against Notts County in a 1–1 draw, extending Oldham's unbeaten run to 10 games. Lockwood was also sent off in the game, thus meaning he would be suspended at the start of the 2014–15 season.

The one – year option the club had on Lockwood's contract was exercised, extending his contract till the end of the 2014–15 season.

Lockwood won the Spirit of Oldham award at the end of season player awards, this award being given to the player who had had the biggest impact at the club since their arrival at the club mid – season.

Manager Johnson named Lockwood as club captain for the 2014–15 season.

=== Guiseley ===
In June 2015 Lockwood joined newly promoted National League side Guiseley A.F.C from Oldham. When Guiseley manager Mark Bower was sacked in 2016 with the club bottom of the National League, Lockwood was appointed manager in September 2016 with Dave Penney as assistant. He helped the club avoid relegation on the final day of the 2016–17 season, but was sacked on 30 August 2017 at a time when Guiseley were third-from-bottom in the table.

== Career statistics ==
Appearances and goals by club, season and competition
Club	Season	League			FA Cup		League Cup		Other		Total	
Club	Season	Division	Apps	Goals	Apps	Goals	Apps	Goals	Apps	Goals	Apps	Goals
Reading	1999–2000	Second Division	0	0	0	0	0	0	0	0	0	0
Reading	2000–01	Second Division	0	0	0	0	0	0	0	0	0	0
Reading	2001–02	Second Division	0	0	0	0	0	0	0	0	0	0
Reading	Total		0	0	0	0	0	0	0	0	0	0
Forest Green Rovers (loan)	2000–01	Conference	10	1	0	0	—		3 (Note: Appearance(s) in FA Trophy)	0	13	1
Yeovil Town	2001–02	Conference	30	0	1	0	—		9 (Note: Eight appearances in FA Trophy, one appearance in Football League Trophy)	0	40	0
Yeovil Town	2002–03	Conference	41	3	2	1	—		7 (Note: Four appearances and two goals in FA Trophy, one appearance in Football League Trophy, two appearances in Somerset Premier Cup)	2	50	6
Yeovil Town	2003–04	Third Division	43	4	3	0	1	0	2 (Note: Appearance(s) in Football League Trophy)	0	49	4
Yeovil Town	2004–05	League Two	10	0	0	0	1	0	0	0	11	0
Yeovil Town	2005–06	League One	20	0	—		1	0	0	0	21	0
Yeovil Town	Total		144	7	6	1	3	0	18	2	171	10
Torquay United (loan)	2005–06	League Two	9	3	3	0	—		—		12	3
Doncaster Rovers	2006–07	League One	44	2	4	0	3	0	7	0	58	2
Doncaster Rovers	2007–08	League One	40	3	2	0	2	0	1 (Note: Appearance in League One play-offs)	0	44	3
Doncaster Rovers	2008–09	Championship	24	0	3	0	0	0	—		25	0
Doncaster Rovers	2009–10	Championship	18	2	0	0	2	0	—		18	2
Doncaster Rovers	2010–11	Championship	16	1	2	0	1	0	—		19	1
Doncaster Rovers	2011–12	Championship	14	0	1	0	0	0	—		15	0
Doncaster Rovers	Total		151	8	12	0	8	0	8	0	179	9
Bury	2012–13	League One	17	1	1	0	0	0	1	0	19	1
Bury	2013–14	League Two	1	0	0	0	0	0	0	0	1	0
Bury	Total		18	1	1	0	0	0	1	0	20	1
Guiseley	2013–14	National League North	6	0	0	0	—		1	0	7	0
Oldham Athletic	2013–14	League One	19	2	0	0	0	0	0	0	19	2
Oldham Athletic	2014–15	League One	12	0	0	0	0	0	0	0	12	0
Oldham Athletic	Total		31	2	0	0	0	0	0	0	31	2
Guiseley	2015–16	National League	26	0	2	0	—		2	0	30	0
Guiseley	2016–17	National League	2	0	0	0	—		0	0	2	0
Guiseley	Total		28	0	2	0	—		2	0	32	0
Career total			397	22	24	1	11	0	33	2	465	25

== Managerial statistics ==
As of match played 29 April 2017

Managerial record by team and tenure
Team	From	To	Record					Ref
Team	From	To	P	W	D	L	Win %	Ref
Guiseley	21 August 2016	30 August 2017	52	15	15	22	28.8	
Total			52	15	15	22	28.8	—

== Honours ==
Yeovil Town

- Football League Two: 2004–05
- Football Conference: 2002–03
- FA Trophy: 2001–02

Doncaster Rovers

- Football League One play-offs: 2008
- Football League Trophy: 2006–07

Individual

- Doncaster Rovers Player of the Year: 2006–07
- Doncaster Rovers Hall of Fame
- Oldham Athletic Spirit of Oldham Award: 2013–14
