= Colin Miles =

English footballer (born 1978)

Personal information
- Full name: Colin Ian Miles
- Birth name: Colin Ian Pluck
- Date of birth: 6 September 1978 (age 48)
- Place of birth: Edmonton, England
- Height: 6 ft 0 in (1.83 m)
- Position: Defender

Youth career
- 1993–1997: Watford

Senior career*
Years	Team	Apps	(Gls)
1997–2000	Watford	1	(0)
2000	Greenock Morton	4	(0)
2000	Stevenage Borough	3	(0)
2000	Hayes	4	(0)
2000–2001	Dover Athletic	10	(0)
2001–2006	Yeovil Town	149	(8)
2006–2008	Port Vale	32	(0)
2008–2009	Woking	30	(1)
Total		233	(9)
- * Club domestic league appearances and goals

Colin Ian Miles (born Colin Pluck; 6 September 1978) is an English former footballer who played as a defender.

He began his career with Watford between 1996 and 2000, though he would play little role in the club's rise from the Second Division to the Premier League. After a stint with Greenock Morton in 2000, he moved on to non-League Dover Athletic later in the year following spells with Greenock Morton and Stevenage Borough. In 2001, he signed with Yeovil Town; he would become a cult figure at the club over his five-year stay, helping them win promotion from the Conference National to League One. He spent two years from 2006 with Port Vale before ending his career with Woking at the end of the 2008–09 season.

== Career ==
Miles began his career with Watford, making his senior debut on 20 September 1997 at the Priestfield Stadium; he was replaced by the veteran Nigel Gibbs on 69 minutes and watched the "Horns" play out a 2–2 draw with Gillingham. On 9 December, he played 90 minutes of a 1–0 defeat to Fulham at Craven Cottage in the first round of the Football League Trophy. Watford won the Second Division championship that season, before winning promotion to the Premier League in 1998–99. Not cut out for the top tier, this spelt the end of Miles' time at the club. In February 2000, he signed with Greenock Morton, playing five games in their 1999–2000 campaign, before heading back to England with Stevenage Borough in March. From the Premier League to the Scottish First Division, he finished the season in the Conference National, playing three games of the 1999–2000 Conference season. He spent part of October and November 2000 with Conference strugglers Hayes – scoring an own goal on his debut, before signing with Dover Athletic in December. He played eleven games for Dover before departing at the end of the season.

When, in June 2001, Miles ended up at Yeovil Town, he had finally found stability in his career. Playing thirty games in the 2001–02 season, his first senior goal came 21 minutes into a 17 November fixture with Margate, in what was the only goal that night at Hartsdown Park. His second goal came on 29 January, seven minutes into a 2–2 home draw with Forest Green Rovers. On 12 May, he played in the FA Trophy final against Stevenage at Villa Park, Yeovil winning 2–0. In 2002–03, the "Glovers" stormed to the Conference title, 17 points clear of Morecambe. Miles scored against both Stevenage and Kettering Town, but it was his bookings that got him attention. He had been booked twelve times in 38 games, as well as being sent off against Telford United. Miles and Yeovil's rise to the Football League was a spectacular one, as they finished a healthy 8th. Miles played 41 games, 36 of which were in League Two. He scored six goals, an impressive total for a defender, his goals coming against York City, Wrexham, Lincoln City, Barnet, Cambridge United and Bristol Rovers – all at home. He was again frequently in trouble with referees, picking up eight bookings, including a run of four cards in four games.

In 2004–05, Yeovil won the league, though Miles made just 24 appearances, including three in the FA Cup. He scored against Darlington in the cup and was sent off in the league against Shrewsbury Town. In February, he tore a knee ligament, keeping him out of action for a few weeks. At the end of the season he signed a new one-year deal with the club. The 2005–06 season was his last with Yeovil. He made 30 League One appearances and five cup appearances. In June, he signed with League One rivals Port Vale, sensing the Burslem club were "going places".

Martin Foyle played him 33 times in 2006–07, including him in the League Cup tie with Tottenham Hotspur at White Hart Lane that finished 3–1 to "Spurs". He was sent off against Bradford City on 16 September, but kept his yellow card tally down to a respectable four. He took the field five times in 2007–08, struggling with poor form and a swollen knee. New manager Lee Sinnott chose against offering Miles a new deal in the summer. In August, he returned to Conference football with Woking. Woking suffered relegation in 2008–09, seven points off the safety spot occupied by Barrow. Miles played thirty games, scoring on his final appearance, in a 2–2 draw with Mansfield Town at Kingfield Stadium on 18 April. He was dismissed from the pitch twice in the season, in away games at Eastbourne Borough (for foul and abusive language) and Barrow. He was released upon the season's conclusion.

== Style of play ==
"Charming, quiet and almost reserved off the pitch, one rarely had long to wait for his er 'special song' to ring out from the terrace when he was on it. "Colin Miles is a f***ing mentalist!" didn't leave anything to the imagination about his style of play: wholehearted and sometimes rugged, he added steel in a side that could be too cultured for its own good on occasion."

— A writer at independent Yeovil Town fan site Ciderspace explains the defender's popularity at Huish Park.

== Personal life ==
He changed his surname from Pluck to Miles in 2004 for family reasons.

== Career statistics ==
Appearances and goals by club, season and competition
Club	Season	League			National cup (Note: Includes FA Cup, Scottish Cup)		League cup (Note: Includes Football League Cup, Scottish League Cup)		Other		Total	
Club	Season	Division	Apps	Goals	Apps	Goals	Apps	Goals	Apps	Goals	Apps	Goals
Watford	1996–97	Second Division	0	0	0	0	0	0	0	0	0	0
Watford	1997–98	Second Division	1	0	0	0	0	0	1 (Note: Appearance(s) in the EFL Trophy.)	0	2	0
Watford	1998–99	First Division	0	0	0	0	0	0	0	0	0	0
Watford	1999–2000	Premier League	0	0	0	0	0	0	—		0	0
Watford	Total		1	0	0	0	0	0	1	0	2	0
Greenock Morton	1999–2000	Scottish First Division	4	0	1	0	0	0	0	0	5	0
Stevenage Borough	1999–2000	Conference National	3	0	0	0	—		0	0	3	0
Hayes	2000–01	Conference National	4	0	1	0	—		0	0	5	0
Dover Athletic	2000–01	Conference National	10	0	0	0	—		1	0	11	0
Yeovil Town	2001–02	Conference National	26	2	0	0	—		4 (Note: Appearance(s) in the FA Trophy.)	0	30	2
Yeovil Town	2002–03	Conference National	36	2	1	0	—		1	0	38	2
Yeovil Town	2003–04	League Two	36	4	3	2	0	0	2	0	41	6
Yeovil Town	2004–05	League Two	21	0	3	1	0	0	0	0	24	1
Yeovil Town	2005–06	League One	30	0	3	0	1	0	1	0	35	0
Yeovil Town	Total		149	8	10	3	1	0	8	0	168	11
Port Vale	2006–07	League One	29	0	2	0	1	0	1	0	33	0
Port Vale	2007–08	League One	3	0	1	0	1	0	0	0	5	0
Port Vale	Total		32	0	3	0	2	0	1	0	38	0
Woking	2008–09	Conference National	30	1	0	0	—		0	0	30	1
Career total			233	9	15	3	3	0	11	0	262	12

== Honours ==
Watford

- Football League Second Division: 1997–98

Yeovil Town

- Football League Two: 2004–05
- Conference National: 2002–03
- FA Trophy: 2001–02
