= Andy Lindegaard =

English footballer

Personal information
- Full name: Andrew Rindom Lindegaard
- Date of birth: 10 September 1980 (age 46)
- Place of birth: Yeovil, England
- Positions: Full back; midfielder

Youth career
- Yeovil Town

Senior career*
| Years | Team | Apps | (Gls) |
- Westland Sports
| 1999–2007 | Yeovil Town | 158 | (11) |
| 2003 | → Weymouth (loan) | 3 | (0) |
| 2005 | → Crawley Town (loan) | 10 | (1) |
| 2007–2009 | Cheltenham Town | 57 | (2) |
| 2009 | → Aldershot Town (loan) | 6 | (1) |
| 2009–2010 | Yeovil Town | 5 | (0) |
| 2010 | Truro City | 7 | (0) |
| Total | | 246 | (15) |
- * Club domestic league appearances and goals

Andrew Rindom Lindegaard (born 10 September 1980) is an English former footballer who is most famous for playing at Yeovil Town. He played as a full back, but was also deployed as midfielder occasionally.

== Career ==
He first played for local side Westland Sports in the Dorset Combination league, before joining Yeovil Town. In 2003, Lindegaard signed for Weymouth on loan. In September 2005, he signed for Crawley Town on a one-month loan. Lindegaard's loan was extended by a month and he returned to the Glovers in November 2005. In 2007, Lindegaard signed for Cheltenham Town after being released by Yeovil. He signed on loan for Aldershot Town in 2009, where he scored once against Gillingham. He was released by the Robins at the end of the 2008–09 season and signed for his former club, Yeovil Town. He left Yeovil in January 2010 after deciding not to renew his contract. Lindegaard signed for Truro City in 2010.

== Personal life ==
In 2010, Lindegaard and his sister-in-law set up a fitness company, Dymond Strength.

== Career statistics ==
Appearances and goals by club, season and competition
| Club | Season | League | | | FA Cup | | League Cup | | Other | | Total | |
| Club | Season | Division | Apps | Goals | Apps | Goals | Apps | Goals | Apps | Goals | Apps | Goals |
|---|---|---|---|---|---|---|---|---|---|---|---|---|
| Yeovil Town | 1999–2000 | Conference | 9 | 1 | 0 | 0 | — | | 1 (Note: Appearance in Somerset Premier Cup) | 0 | 10 | 1 |
| Yeovil Town | 2000–01 | Conference | 26 | 0 | 5 | 0 | — | | 5 (Note: Two appearances and one goal in FA Trophy, one appearance in Conference League Cup, two appearances in Somerset Premier Cup) | 1 | 36 | 1 |
| Yeovil Town | 2001–02 | Conference | 7 | 1 | 0 | 0 | — | | 3 (Note: Two appearances in FA Trophy, one appearance in Somerset Premier Cup) | 0 | 10 | 1 |
| Yeovil Town | 2002–03 | Conference | 27 | 6 | 2 | 0 | — | | 7 (Note: Three appearances in FA Trophy, one appearance in Football League Trophy, three appearances in Somerset Premier Cup) | 0 | 36 | 6 |
| Yeovil Town | 2003–04 | Third Division | 23 | 2 | 1 | 0 | 1 | 0 | 0 | 0 | 25 | 2 |
| Yeovil Town | 2004–05 | League Two | 29 | 1 | 4 | 0 | 0 | 0 | 1 (Note: Appearance(s) in Football League Trophy) | 0 | 34 | 1 |
| Yeovil Town | 2005–06 | League One | 23 | 0 | 0 | 0 | 0 | 0 | 0 | 0 | 23 | 0 |
| Yeovil Town | 2006–07 | League One | 14 | 0 | 0 | 0 | 0 | 0 | 3 (Note: Appearances in League One play-offs) | 0 | 17 | 0 |
| Yeovil Town | Total | | 158 | 11 | 12 | 0 | 1 | 0 | 20 | 1 | 191 | 12 |
| Weymouth (loan) | 2002–03 | Southern League; Premier Division | 3 | 0 | — | | — | | 3 (Note: Two appearances in FA Trophy, one appearance and one goal in Southern League Cup) | 1 | 6 | 1 |
| Crawley Town (loan) | 2005–06 | Conference National | 10 | 1 | 0 | 0 | — | | 2 (Note: One appearance in Football League Trophy, one appearance and two goals in Sussex Senior Challenge Cup) | 2 | 12 | 3 |
| Cheltenham Town | 2007–08 | League One | 42 | 2 | 0 | 0 | 1 | 0 | 0 | 0 | 43 | 2 |
| Cheltenham Town | 2008–09 | League One | 15 | 0 | 2 | 0 | 2 | 0 | 1 | 0 | 20 | 0 |
| Cheltenham Town | Total | | 57 | 2 | 2 | 0 | 3 | 0 | 1 | 0 | 63 | 2 |
| Aldershot Town (loan) | 2008–09 | League Two | 6 | 1 | — | | — | | — | | 6 | 1 |
| Yeovil Town | 2009–10 | League One | 5 | 0 | 0 | 0 | 0 | 0 | 1 | 0 | 6 | 0 |
| Career total | | | 239 | 15 | 14 | 0 | 4 | 0 | 27 | 4 | 284 | 19 |

== Honours ==
Yeovil Town

- Football League Two: 2004–05
- FA Trophy: 2001–02
