= Nick Crittenden =

English footballer (born 1978)

Personal information
- Full name: Nicholas John Crittenden
- Date of birth: 11 November 1978 (age 47)
- Place of birth: Bracknell, Berkshire, England
- Position: Midfielder

Youth career
- Chelsea

Senior career*
| Years | Team | Apps | (Gls) |
| 1997–2000 | Chelsea | 2 | (0) |
| 1998 | → Plymouth Argyle (loan) | 2 | (0) |
| 2000–2004 | Yeovil Town | 146 | (21) |
| 2004–2006 | Aldershot Town | 82 | (13) |
| 2006–2008 | Weymouth | 68 | (8) |
| 2008–2017 | Dorchester Town | 252 | (28) |
| Total | | 552 | (70) |

International career
| 2002 | England National Game XI | 1 | (1) |

Managerial career
- 2015: Dorchester Town (caretaker)
- 2015–2017: Dorchester Town (assistant)
- * Club domestic league appearances and goals

Nicholas John Crittenden (born 11 November 1978) is an English former professional footballer who played as a right midfielder.

== Career ==
Crittenden was a Chelsea youth team player before being released in August 2000 after making just two substitute appearances in the league and a further appearance in the League Cup. He was loaned out to Plymouth Argyle in 1998 in order to gain first team experience. He joined the then Conference side Yeovil Town on professional terms. He was with Yeovil for three years, winning the Football Conference and the FA Trophy during his time with the Glovers. He played 163 games and scored some important goals for Yeovil, including one against Blackpool in the FA Cup and the goal that won the game away at Bristol Rovers in 2003.

After four seasons, he moved on from Yeovil, joining Aldershot Town in 2004. With Aldershot, he played in the Conference play-off semi-final at the end of the 2004–05 season, which Aldershot lost on penalties. He moved to Weymouth on a free transfer for the 2006–07 season, before signing for rivals Dorchester Town in the summer of 2008.

On 15 January 2015, following the departure of manager Graham Kemp, Crittenden was placed in temporary charge of Dorchester Town on a caretaker basis. Crittenden was then appointed player-assistant boss to new player-manager Mark Jermyn.

== Career statistics ==
As of 26 December 2016

Appearances and goals by club, season and competition
| Club | Season | League | | | FA Cup | | League Cup | | Other | | Total | |
| Club | Season | Division | Apps | Goals | Apps | Goals | Apps | Goals | Apps | Goals | Apps | Goals |
|---|---|---|---|---|---|---|---|---|---|---|---|---|
| Chelsea | 1997–98 | Premier League | 2 | 0 | 0 | 0 | 1 | 0 | 0 | 0 | 3 | 0 |
| Chelsea | 1998–99 | Premier League | 0 | 0 | 0 | 0 | 0 | 0 | 0 | 0 | 0 | 0 |
| Chelsea | 1999–2000 | Premier League | 0 | 0 | 0 | 0 | 0 | 0 | 0 | 0 | 0 | 0 |
| Chelsea | Total | | 2 | 0 | 0 | 0 | 1 | 0 | 0 | 0 | 3 | 0 |
| Plymouth Argyle (loan) | 1998–99 | Third Division | 2 | 0 | 0 | 0 | 0 | 0 | 0 | 0 | 2 | 0 |
| Yeovil Town | 2000–01 | Conference | 42 | 6 | 5 | 1 | — | | 7 (Note: Three appearances in FA Trophy, one appearance in Football League Trophy, two appearances in Conference League Cup, one appearance in Somerset Premier Cup) | 0 | 54 | 7 |
| Yeovil Town | 2001–02 | Conference | 40 | 4 | 1 | 0 | — | | 10 (Note: Eight appearances and two goals in FA Trophy, two appearances in Football League Trophy) | 2 | 51 | 6 |
| Yeovil Town | 2002–03 | Conference | 35 | 9 | 3 | 0 | — | | 6 (Note: Two appearances goals in FA Trophy, one appearance in Football League Trophy, three appearances and two goals in Somerset Premier Cup) | 2 | 44 | 11 |
| Yeovil Town | 2003–04 | Third Division | 29 | 2 | 3 | 1 | 1 | 0 | 1 (Note: Appearance in Football League Trophy) | 0 | 34 | 3 |
| Yeovil Town | Total | | 146 | 21 | 12 | 2 | 1 | 0 | 24 | 4 | 183 | 27 |
| Aldershot Town | 2004–05 | Conference Premier | 41 | 6 | 3 | 1 | — | | 8 (Note: Two appearances and one goal in Conference National play-offs, one appearance in FA Trophy, one appearance in Conference League Cup, four appearances in Hampshire Senior Cup) | 1 | 52 | 8 |
| Aldershot Town | 2005–06 | Conference Premier | 41 | 7 | 3 | 0 | — | | 5 (Note: Two appearances in FA Trophy, one appearance in Conference League Cup, two appearances in Hampshire Senior Cup) | 0 | 49 | 7 |
| Aldershot Town | Total | | 82 | 13 | 6 | 1 | — | | 13 | 1 | 101 | 15 |
| Weymouth | 2006–07 | Conference Premier | 32 | 4 | 1 | 0 | — | | 0 | 0 | 33 | 4 |
| Weymouth | 2007–08 | Conference Premier | 36 | 4 | 4 | 0 | — | | 2 (Note: Appearances in Conference League Cup) | 0 | 42 | 4 |
| Weymouth | Total | | 68 | 8 | 5 | 0 | — | | 2 | 0 | 75 | 8 |
| Dorchester Town | 2008–09 | Conference South | 38 | 3 | 6 | 3 | — | | 4 (Note: One appearance in FA Trophy, one appearance in Conference League Cup, two appearances in Dorset Senior Cup) | 0 | 48 | 6 |
| Dorchester Town | 2009–10 | Conference South | 27 | 4 | 1 | 1 | — | | 0 | 0 | 28 | 5 |
| Dorchester Town | 2010–11 | Conference South | 33 | 4 | 1 | 1 | — | | 7 (Note: Four appearances and two goals in FA Trophy, three appearances and three goals in Dorset Senior Cup) | 5 | 41 | 10 |
| Dorchester Town | 2011–12 | Conference South | 35 | 3 | 0 | 0 | — | | 3 (Note: One appearance in FA Trophy, two appearances in Dorset Senior Cup) | 0 | 38 | 3 |
| Dorchester Town | 2012–13 | Conference South | 32 | 1 | 1 | 1 | — | | 2 (Note: One appearance in FA Trophy, one appearance in Dorset Senior Cup) | 0 | 35 | 2 |
| Dorchester Town | 2013–14 | Conference South | 34 | 7 | 1 | 0 | — | | 2 (Note: One appearance in FA Trophy, one appearance and one goal in Dorset Senior Cup) | 1 | 37 | 8 |
| Dorchester Town | 2014–15 | Southern Premier | 25 | 6 | 4 | 0 | — | | 2 (Note: Appearances in Dorset Senior Cup) | 0 | 31 | 6 |
| Dorchester Town | 2015–16 | Southern Premier | 20 | 0 | 1 | 0 | — | | 4 (Note: One appearance in FA Trophy, one appearance in Southern League Cup, two appearances in Dorset Senior Cup) | 0 | 25 | 0 |
| Dorchester Town | 2016–17 | Southern Premier | 8 | 0 | 0 | 0 | — | | 1 (Note: Appearance in Southern League Cup) | 0 | 9 | 0 |
| Dorchester Town | Total | | 252 | 28 | 15 | 6 | — | | 25 | 6 | 292 | 40 |
| Career total | | | 552 | 70 | 38 | 9 | 2 | 0 | 64 | 11 | 656 | 90 |

== Managerial statistics ==
As of 18 January 2015

| Team | From | To | Record | | | | |
| Team | From | To | M | W | D | L | Win % |
|---|---|---|---|---|---|---|---|
| Dorchester Town (caretaker) | 15 January 2015 | 17 January 2015 | 1 | 1 | 0 | 0 | 100.00 |
| Total | | | 1 | 1 | 0 | 0 | 100.00 |

== Honours ==
Yeovil Town

- FA Trophy: 2001–02
