= Francis Kumbur =

Nigerian footballer

Personal information
- Full name: Francis Shom Kumbur
- Date of birth: 4 April 1979 (age 47)
- Place of birth: Lagos, Nigeria
- Height: 1.88 m (6 ft 2 in)
- Position: Striker

Senior career*
Years	Team	Apps	(Gls)
1997–1998	Plateau United		
1998–2001	KAC Marrakech		
2002	Yeovil Town	5	(3)
2002–2003	Haywards Heath Town		
2003–2004	Gravesend & Northfleet		
2006–2009	Plateau United		
2009–2010	Eastbourne Town	11	(0)

International career
2002	Nigeria	1	(0)
- * Club domestic league appearances and goals

Francis Shom Kumbur (born 4 April 1979) is a Nigerian former footballer who played at both professional and international levels as a striker.

== Career ==
Born in Lagos, Kumbur has played in Nigeria, Morocco and England for Plateau United, KAC Marrakech, Yeovil Town, Haywards Heath Town, Gravesend & Northfleet and Eastbourne Town.

He also earned one cap for Nigeria in 2002.
