= Abdou El-Kholti =

French footballer (born 1980)

Personal information
- Full name: Abdelhalim El-Kholti
- Date of birth: 17 October 1980 (age 46)
- Place of birth: Annemasse, France
- Height: 5 ft 10 in (1.78 m)
- Positions: Defender; midfielder

Youth career
- 1997–1999: AGP
- 1999–2001: Servette

Senior career*
Years	Team	Apps	(Gls)
2001–2002	Raja Casablanca	?	(?)
2002–2004	Yeovil Town	49	(4)
2004–2005	Cambridge United	15	(0)
2005–2006	Chester City	22	(0)
2006–2007	Weymouth	23	(0)
2007	Grays Athletic	6	(0)
2007–2008	Rushden & Diamonds	13	(0)
2008–2009	Woking	15	(0)
2009	Hayes & Yeading United	?	(?)
2013–20??	Sheppey & Sheermess United	?	(?)
- * Club domestic league appearances and goals

Abdelhalim El-Kholti (born 17 October 1980) is a French former footballer.

== Football career ==
El-Khotli won the Conference National with Yeovil Town, but was part of the Cambridge United side that was relegated from the Football League two years later. However, El-Kholti remained in Football League Two after joining Chester City for a season, before dropping into non-league football himself with Weymouth.

El-Kholti was sold to Grays Athletic following Weymouth's financial crisis, after a handful of appearances for Grays he left by mutual consent in August 2007. Linking up with ex-Weymouth manager, Garry Hill he then joined Rushden & Diamonds shortly after. However, he was released at the end of the 2007–08 season.

On 17 June 2008, it was announced that El-Kholti had joined fellow Conference side Woking. He then joined Hayes & Yeading United in 2009, but made just one appearance for the club in the Middlesex Senior Cup.

== After football ==
After his football career he opened Creperie, a pancake stall, in Canary Wharf.
