= Roy O'Brien =

Irish footballer

Personal information
- Full name: Roy O'Brien
- Date of birth: 27 November 1974 (age 51)
- Place of birth: Cork, Ireland
- Position: Defender

Senior career*
Years	Team	Apps	(Gls)
1995–1996	Arsenal	0	(0)
1996	Wigan Athletic	0	(0)
1996–1997	AFC Bournemouth	1	(0)
1997–2000	Dorchester Town	118	(2)
2000–2005	Yeovil Town	95	(1)
2005–2007	Weymouth	55	(1)
2007–2009	Dorchester Town	48	(2)

Managerial career
- 2007: Weymouth (Player Coach)
- 2009: Dorchester Town (Player-Manager)
- * Club domestic league appearances and goals

Roy O'Brien (born 27 November 1974) is an Irish footballer.

He started his career at Arsenal, before moving on to Wigan Athletic, although he made no first team appearances for either side. Having then made one appearance for AFC Bournemouth, he joined Dorchester and became a regular in their defence. In 2000, he signed for Yeovil Town where he went on to play for five years, mainly at right-back, winning two promotions from the Conference National to League One.

He joined Weymouth halfway through the 2004-05 season, after impressing while on loan from Yeovil, where he stayed until the end of season 2006-07, spending the last 5 months of his tenure at the Wessex Stadium as player-coach.

In June 2007 O'Brien rejoined Dorchester and following Shaun Brooks' resignation, he was appointed player-manager on 5 March 2009.

On 22 November 2009, after just eight months in charge of Dorchester Town, Roy was relieved from his duties as a manager, due to the clubs poor showing in cup competitions. On 28 June 2010, he was appointed manager of Yeovil Town Ladies and will manage them in their first ever season in the FA Women's Premier League, before becoming the club's first team coach and subsequently working with the Yeovil Town Community Sports Trust.

In June 2026, O'Brien returned to Yeovil Town after being appointed as U19s manager.

== Managerial statistics ==
As of 22 November 2009

Team	Nat	From	To	Record				
Team	Nat	From	To	G	W	L	D	Win %
Dorchester Town	(England)	5 March 2009	22 November 2009	28	7	15	6	25.00

== Honours ==
Yeovil Town

- Football League Two: 2004–05
- Football Conference: 2002–03
- FA Trophy: 2001–02
