= Jimmy Aggrey =

English footballer

Personal information
- Full name: James Emmanuel Aggrey
- Date of birth: 26 October 1978 (age 48)
- Place of birth: Hammersmith, England
- Position: Defender

Youth career
- Chelsea

Senior career*
Years	Team	Apps	(Gls)
1995–1997	Chelsea	0	(0)
1997–1998	Fulham	0	(0)
1998	Airdrie	0	(0)
1998–2001	Torquay United	95	(2)
2001–2002	Dover Athletic	8	(1)
2002	Taunton Town	0	(0)
2002	Harrow Borough	0	(0)
2002–2003	Yeovil Town	8	(0)
2003–2004	TNS	71	(2)
2004–2005	Bohemians	9	(2)
2005–2006	Woking	5	(0)
2006	→ Southport (loan)	3	(0)
Total		199	(7)
- * Club domestic league appearances and goals

James Emmanuel Aggrey (born 26 October 1978) is an English former professional footballer. He was born in Hammersmith, London.

Aggrey began his football career as a trainee at Chelsea On 2 July 1997 he left Chelsea to join Fulham on a free transfer as one of Micky Adams' final signings before the arrival of Kevin Keegan and Ray Wilkins. He was released in the summer of 1998 still to make his league debut. On 30 June 1998 he briefly joined Airdrie, followed by a trial at Shrewsbury Town.

On 29 October 1998 he joined Torquay United, initially on a one-month contract to cover for a central defensive injury crisis. He made his debut for Torquay in the 1–1 draw with Scarborough two days later and within that initial month played well enough to earn a permanent contract, though struggled to fully establish himself with Wayne Thomas, Lee Russell and Alex Watson all ahead of him.

In 2000–01, after the sale of Thomas to Stoke City, he was a first-team regular, albeit suspended every so often. After being sent off for violent conduct against Mickey Adams' flying Brighton & Hove Albion side, Aggrey returned that season with some outstanding and commanding performances. He gained 15-man of matches in season 2000/01 and ended the season with the supporters player of year award. Though briefly on the transfer list at his own request in early 2001, he withdrew this request in March 2001, coinciding with the departure of Wes Saunders from the managers' office.

On 28 August 2001 he was placed on the transfer list after new manager Roy McFarland had decided that after the first three games of the season there was no place for Aggrey in his future plans. On 1 October 2001 he joined Rushden & Diamonds on trial, but returned at the end of the trial to resume training at Plainmoor. He finally left Plainmoor on 10 December 2001, after agreeing a settlement on the remaining six months of his contract with Gulls' chairman Mike Bateson.

Later that month he became one of Neville Southall's first signings at Conference strugglers Dover Athletic, scoring the winner on his debut away to local rivals Margate on 26 December. He remained at Dover on non-contract terms, whilst continuing to search for a new league club. In January 2002 he joined Blackpool on trial, but failed to secure a contract and returned to Dover.

In September 2002 he joined Taunton Town, soon moving to Harrow Borough. Aggrey was then signed by Gary Johnson for Yeovil Town in December 2002, where he was part of the Conference winning side. After not being able to settle at Yeovil and yearning for regular first team football, Aggrey moved to Welsh side TNS in August 2003 where he tasted European football in the form of the UEFA Cup against Kevin Keegan's Manchester City side.

The following summer he joined Irish side Bohemians where scored on his debut after 22 mins, live on Irish television, against Shamrock Rovers in an explosive Dublin Derby. He joined Woking in June 2005 but was injured early the following season. He was made available for loan in January 2006.

He subsequently left and retired from professional football to pursue an acting career. He played Willam Laurent Dioup in Sky One's Dream Team.
