= Anthony Tonkin =

English footballer (born 1980)

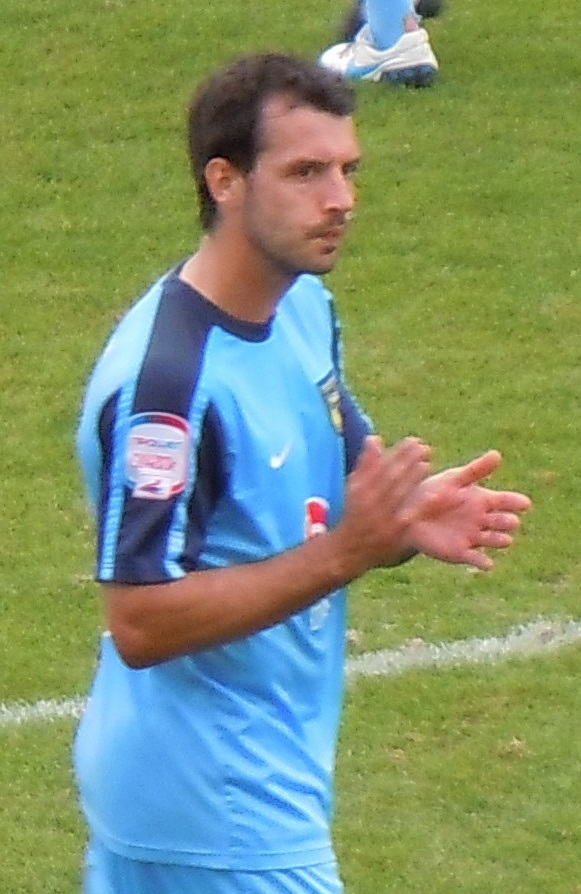
- Tonkin playing for Oxford United in 2008

Personal information
- Full name: Anthony Richard Tonkin
- Date of birth: 17 January 1980 (age 46)
- Place of birth: Penzance, England
- Height: 5 ft 11 in (1.80 m)
- Position: Defender

Senior career*
| Years | Team | Apps | (Gls) |
- Mousehole
- Falmouth Town
| 1998–2002 | Yeovil Town | 97 | (2) |
| 2002–2003 | Stockport County | 24 | (0) |
| 2003–2006 | Crewe Alexandra | 88 | (0) |
| 2006–2007 | Yeovil Town | 5 | (0) |
| 2007 | → Grays Athletic (loan) | 12 | (0) |
| 2007–2008 | Forest Green Rovers | 38 | (0) |
| 2008–2010 | Cambridge United | 60 | (0) |
| 2010–2012 | Oxford United | 73 | (0) |
| 2012–2015 | Aldershot Town | 62 | (0) |
| 2015 | Frome Town | 8 | (0) |
| Total | | 467 | (2) |
- * Club domestic league appearances and goals

Anthony Richard Tonkin (born 17 January 1980) is an English retired professional footballer who played as a defender.

== Career ==
Born in Penzance, Cornwall, Tonkin began his career at Mousehole and Falmouth Town, where he finished as runners-up to Truro City in the South Western League in the 1997–98 season. His success with Falmouth attracted Yeovil Town, who signed him up in 1998, where he made 95 appearances and scored one goal in three years at the club. In 2002, he moved to Stockport County, where he spent a year before being transferred to Crewe Alexandra in August 2003 for a reported fee of £150,000. After more than 90 appearances in under three years, he was released and subsequently returned to Yeovil.

On 2 March 2007, he joined Grays Athletic on loan for the remainder of the season. He was released by Yeovil upon his return in May 2007. Two months later, he signed for Conference National club Forest Green Rovers, reportedly turning down Football League clubs to stay in the Southwest. He made 38 league appearances as the club finished in their highest-ever league placing, but was released at the end of the season.

Tonkin joined Cambridge United on 1 July 2008. In January 2010, Tonkin joined Oxford United for an undisclosed fee. In May 2012, Tonkin was released by the club after being deemed surplus to requirements. On 25 May 2012, Tonkin joined Aldershot Town on a one-year deal which sees him join former teammate Josh Payne at the Recreation Ground. He was a first team regular at Aldershot Town proving to be a consistent performer in an underperforming side.

However, the defender was released by Aldershot in February 2015, but was soon signed by Southern League side Frome Town initially until the end of the 2014–15 season.

== Honours ==
Yeovil Town

- FA Trophy: 2001–02

Oxford United

- Conference National play-offs: 2009–10
