= Chris Giles =

Welsh footballer

Personal information
- Full name: Christopher Giles
- Date of birth: 16 April 1982 (age 44)
- Place of birth: Bridgend, Wales
- Position: Defender

Youth career
- Sherborne Town
- Yeovil Town

Senior career*
Years	Team	Apps	(Gls)
2000–2004	Yeovil Town	45	(8)
2002–2003	→ Gravesend & Northfleet (loan)	11	(2)
2004	→ Woking (loan)	6	(0)
2004–2005	Aldershot Town	43	(1)
2005–2006	Crawley Town	28	(2)
2006–2008	Forest Green Rovers	56	(5)
2008–2010	Crawley Town	35	(1)
2010–2013	Salisbury City	43	(7)
Total		267	(26)
- * Club domestic league appearances and goals

Chris Giles (born 16 April 1982) is a Welsh former footballer, who was most recently acting first team coach at Yeovil Town. He played predominantly as a defender, but could also play as a striker.

== Playing career ==
=== Yeovil Town ===
Giles began his career with Yeovil Town, as youth team top goalscorer and Player of the Year. In his time there, they won the FA Trophy and then promotion to the Football League in 2002–03. The following season, he only played one league game for the club before being loaned out to Woking. He was allowed to leave the club in March of the 2003–04 season.

=== Aldershot Town ===
After leaving Yeovil, Giles soon joined Aldershot Town. During his two years there, he helped them to reach the Play-off Final and Play-off Semi-final of the Conference.

=== Crawley Town ===
After a two-year stint with Aldershot, he then signed for Crawley Town in 2005, signing a two-year contract with the club. After helping them fight off relegation, he left at the beginning of his second year due to the club's financial troubles.

=== Forest Green Rovers ===
He soon joined Forest Green Rovers in 2006 and succeeded in helping them avoid relegation. As vice captain he made 33 league appearances in the 2007–08 season as the club finished in their highest ever league placing, but was released at the end of the season.

=== Back to Crawley ===
He re-signed for Crawley Town on 23 May 2008 and was named Club Captain in the season that they too achieved their highest ever placing. Giles has made 6 appearances for the Wales Semi-Professional side, scoring three times. Giles left Crawley by mutual consent in January 2010 following a number of injury problems.

=== Salisbury City ===
After release from Crawley, he was quickly snapped up by Salisbury City on a contract until the end of the 2009–10 season that very same day. This deal was extended in the summer of 2010, despite the club's two league demotion. Giles was awarded the captain's armband for his loyalty and became a key player for the side. However, halfway through the 2010–11 season, Giles was given a 6-month leave of absence due to personal circumstances, but at the same time committed his future to the Whites by signing a new deal for the 2011–12 season. He returned to the Whites for the start of pre-season in July 2011. In March 2012, Giles agreed a new one-year contract with Salisbury. In June 2013, he was made interim first team coach at the club after he retired from playing due to persistent injury problems.

== Coaching career ==
=== Salisbury City ===
Following two unsuccessful ankle operations whilst playing at Salisbury City FC, Giles firstly supported manager Darryl Clarke and then Michael Harris on the coaching staff, focusing on defence, fitness and analysis.

=== Yeovil Town ===
On 22 December 2015, Giles returned to Yeovil Town as acting first team coach under interim manager Darren Way.

== Honours ==
Yeovil Town

- FA Trophy: 2001–02
