= Kirk Jackson =

English footballer

Personal information
- Date of birth: 16 October 1976 (age 50)
- Place of birth: Barnsley, England
- Position: Striker

Team information
- Current team: Sheffield

Youth career
- Sheffield Wednesday

Senior career*
Years	Team	Apps	(Gls)
1993–1996	Sheffield Wednesday	0	(0)
1996–1997	Scunthorpe United	4	(1)
1997–1998	Chesterfield	4	(0)
1998	Grantham Town	?	(?)
1999–2000	Worksop Town	22	(40)
2000	Darlington	21	(1)
2000–2002	Stevenage Borough	35	(12)
2002–2004	Yeovil Town	52	(23)
2004	→ Dagenham & Redbridge (loan)	15	(6)
2004	Hornchurch	4	(1)
2004–2006	Weymouth	63	(16)
2006–	Harrogate Town	29	(9)
2007–2008	→ Tamworth (loan)	1	(0)
2008–2009	Worksop Town		
2009–	Sheffield F.C.		

International career^{‡}
2002–2003	England National Game XI	6	(3)
- * Club domestic league appearances and goals as of 18:00, 2 December 2007 (UTC) ‡ National team caps and goals as of 14:47, 17 May 2008 (UTC)

Kirk Jackson (born 16 October 1976) is a retired semi professional footballer who played as a striker.

Jackson mostly made his name as a non-League footballer although he has experience in League football. He was part of the Yeovil Town team which won the Conference in 2003.

== Honours ==
Individual

- Football Conference Goalscorer of the Month: March 2003
