= Carl Alford =

English footballer (born 1972)

Personal information
- Full name: Carl Peter Alford
- Date of birth: 11 February 1972 (age 54)
- Place of birth: Denton, England
- Position: Striker

Senior career*
Years	Team	Apps	(Gls)
1988	Rochdale	4	(0)
- Burnley
- Stockport County
- → Morecambe (loan)
- Witton Albion
1993–1994	Macclesfield Town	34	(14)
1994–1996	Kettering Town	94	(54)
1996–1998	Rushden & Diamonds	52	(22)
1998	→ Dover Athletic (loan)		(7)
1998–2000	Stevenage Borough	39	(42)
2000–2001	Doncaster Rovers	17	(1)
2001	→ Kettering Town (loan)	2	(0)
2001–2002	Yeovil Town	52	(10)
2002–2003	Nuneaton Borough	9	(2)
2003–2004	Gainsborough Trinity		
2004	Leigh RMI		(20)
- Woodley Sports
- Nuneaton Borough
- New Mills

International career
1996	England National Game XI	2	(2)
- * Club domestic league appearances and goals

Carl Peter Alford (born 11 February 1972) is an English football coach and former professional footballer who played as a striker.

He notably played in the Football League for Rochdale, Burnley and Stockport County, but spent most of his career at Non-League level where he turned out for Morecambe, Witton Albion, Macclesfield Town, Kettering Town, Rushden & Diamonds, Dover Athletic, Stevenage Borough, Doncaster Rovers, Yeovil Town, Nuneaton Borough, Gainsborough Trinity, Leigh RMI, Woodley Sports and ending his career at New Mills in 2007.

== Playing career ==
After a brief trial with Manchester United in January 1988, Alford made his professional debut for Rochdale as a substitute but failed to impress and was later released. After periods at both Burnley and Stockport County, plus a loan period at Morecambe, he made the decision to drop down to non-league football, joining Witton Albion where his knack for goal-scoring flourished. In the summer of 1993, he joined Macclesfield Town of the Conference for a fee of £1,700, the goals that he scored for Witton Albion are not shown in his Conference goals total. He then joined Kettering Town for £25,000 the following summer.

After scoring 54 goals for Kettering Town in 18 months, Rushden & Diamonds offer of £85,000, a non-league record, was enough to persuade the Poppies to sell their prize asset and he arrived at Nene Park at the end of March 1996. He made his debut in against promotion rivals Halesowen Town on 30 March 1996, scoring Diamonds goal in the 2–1 defeat.

He was dropped after just five games at the start of the 1997–98 season and was loaned to Dover Athletic in February 1998. He was recalled and sold to Stevenage Borough on a free transfer in April. Alford scored more than a goal a game at Stevenage, and was snapped up by Doncaster Rovers in May 2000 for £50,000. After a period on loan back at Kettering Town in January 2001, he joined Yeovil Town in the summer helping them to lift the FA Trophy in 2002, scoring in the final against Stevenage. The following season, he left the Glovers in December 2002 and joined Nuneaton Borough. He went on to play for Gainsborough Trinity, Woodley Sports, Leigh RMI and Nuneaton Borough (again) and was last noted playing for North West Counties League side New Mills AFC in the 2006–07 season.

== Coaching career ==
Alford holds a UEFA B coaching license and works at the University of Glasgow as a Eurofit coach trainer.
