= 2001–02 FA Trophy =

FA Challenge Trophy

Tournament details
- Country: England; Wales
- Teams: 177

Final positions
- Champions: Yeovil Town
- Runners-up: Stevenage Borough

The 2001–02 FA Trophy was the thirty-fourth season of the FA Trophy. A total of 177 clubs entered the competition.

The competition was won for the first time by Yeovil Town, who defeated Stevenage Borough 2–0 in the Final at Villa Park, Birmingham on 12 May 2002.

== 1st round ==
=== Ties ===
| Tie | Home team | Score | Away team |
|---|---|---|---|
| 1 | Ashford Town (Kent) | 1-2 | Bromley |
| 2 | Ashton United | 4-1 | Rocester |
| 3 | Atherstone United | 1-2 | Spennymoor United |
| 4 | Banbury United | 1-0 | Windsor & Eton |
| 5 | Barking & East Ham United | 1-3 | Cindeford Town |
| 6 | Barrow | 2-1 | Halesowen Town |
| 7 | Bath City | 2-3 | Newport County |
| 8 | Bedford Town | 4-0 | Worthing |
| 9 | Belper Town | 0-4 | Runcorn Halton |
| 10 | Bilston Town | 1-1 | Gresley Rovers |
| 11 | Bloxwich United | 2-3 | Solihull Borough |
| 12 | Blyth Spartans | 2-0 | Burscough |
| 13 | Burnham | 1-1 | Yeading |
| 14 | Cambridge City | 4-1 | Gloucester City |
| 15 | Carshalton Athletic | 5-1 | St Leonards |
| 16 | Chippenham Town | 1-4 | Walton & Hersham |
| 17 | Chorley | 0-1 | Farsley Celtic |
| 18 | Clevedon Town | 3-3 | Harlow Town |
| 19 | Corby Town | 0-3 | Vauxhall Motors |
| 20 | Crawley Town | 0-1 | Newport I O W |
| 21 | Croydon | 3-1 | Ford United |
| 22 | Dartford | 0-3 | Braintree Town |
| 23 | Droylsden | 1-1 | Frickley Athletic |
| 24 | Dulwich Hamlet | 3-1 | Evesham United |
| 25 | Eastbourne Borough | 0-0 | Chatham Town |
| 26 | Enfield | 2-1 | Hastings Town |
| 27 | Folkestone Invicta | 0-1 | Tiverton Town |
| 28 | Gateshead | 4-0 | Redditch United |
| 29 | Grantham Town | 1-0 | Stamford |
| 30 | Gravesend & Northfleet | 2-0 | Chelmsford City |
| 31 | Gretna | 3-1 | Witton Albion |
| 32 | Guiseley | 0-0 | Stafford Rangers |
| 33 | Harrogate Town | 2-0 | Colwyn Bay |
| 34 | Harrow Borough | 2-3 | Dorchester Town |
| 35 | Havant & Waterlooville | 2-3 | Grays Athletic |
| 36 | Hednesford Town | 5-0 | Racing Club Warwick |
| 37 | Hendon | 2-1 | Sutton United |
| 38 | Heybridge Swifts | 2-3 | Erith & Belvedere |
| 39 | Hinckley United | 2-1 | Eastwood Town |
| 40 | Histon | 3-1 | Weston super Mare |
| 41 | Hitchin Town | 1-2 | Kingstonian |
| 42 | Ilkeston Town | 1-0 | Gainsborough Trinity |
| 43 | Kendal Town | 3-2 | Bradford Park Avenue |
| 44 | Kettering Town | 3-1 | Swindon Supermarine |
| 45 | Leek Town | 0-1 | Tamworth |
| 46 | Matlock Town | 1-1 | Marine |
| 47 | Moor Green | 3-0 | Bamber Bridge |
| 48 | North Ferriby United | 1-0 | Shepshed Dynamo |
| 49 | Northwood | 0-1 | Maidenhead United |
| 50 | Ossett Town | 1-1 | Hyde United |
| 51 | Oxford City | 2-4 | Bashley |
| 52 | Purfleet | 4-2 | Boreham Wood |
| 53 | Radcliffe Borough | 0-0 | Accrington Stanley |
| 54 | Rossendale United | 3-3 | Bedworth United |
| 55 | Rothwell Town | 1-1 | Billericay Town |
| 56 | Rugby United | 1-4 | Bognor Regis Town |
| 57 | Sittingbourne | 1-3 | Fisher Athletic |
| 58 | Slough Town | 0-2 | Aylesbury United |
| 59 | Spalding United | 0-0 | Altrincham |
| 60 | Staines Town | 1-2 | Thame United |
| 61 | Stocksbridge Park Steels | 1-1 | Whitby Town |
| 62 | Sutton Coldfield Town | 1-0 | Hucknall Town |
| 63 | Tonbridge Angels | 3-3 | Merthyr Tydfil |
| 64 | Tooting & Mitcham United | 3-0 | Salisbury City |
| 65 | Trafford | 1-1 | Ossett Albion |
| 66 | Uxbridge | 3-3 | Cirencester Town |
| 67 | Wealdstone | 1-1 | Bishop's Stortford |
| 68 | Whyteleafe | 0-5 | Hampton & Richmond Borough |
| 69 | Wisbech Town | 1-1 | St Albans City |
| 70 | Worcester City | 1-1 | Mangotsfield United |
| 71 | Workington | 0-2 | Lincoln United |

=== Replays ===
| Tie | Home team | Score | Away team |
|---|---|---|---|
| 10 | Gresley Rovers | 0-0 | Bilston Town |
| | (Gresley Rovers won 5-4 on penalties) | | |
| 12 | Yeading | 1-2 | Burnham |
| 18 | Harlow Town | 5-0 | Clevedon Town |
| 23 | Frickley Athletic | 1-1 | Droylsden |
| | (Frickley Athletic won 4-3 on penalties) | | |
| 25 | Chatham Town | 0-1 | Eastbourne Borough |
| 32 | Stafford Rangers | 4-2 | Guiseley |
| 46 | Marine | 3-2 | Matlock Town |
| 50 | Hyde United | 3-2 | Ossett Town |
| 53 | Accrington Stanley | 2-0 | Radcliffe Borough |
| 54 | Bedworth United | 2-0 | Rossendale United |
| 55 | Billericay Town | 5-3 | Rothwell Town |
| 59 | Altrincham | 3-2 | Spalding United |
| 61 | Whitby Town | 3-0 | Stocksbridge Park Steels |
| 63 | Merthyr Tydfil | 3-2 | Tonbridge Angels |
| 65 | Ossett Albion | 0-3 | Trafford |
| 66 | Cirencester Town | 4-1 | Uxbridge |
| 67 | Bishop's Stortford | 3-2 | Wealdstone |
| 69 | St Albans City | 3-0 | Wisbech Town |
| 70 | Mangotsfield United | 2-1 | Worcester City |

== 2nd round ==
=== Ties ===
| Tie | Home team | Score | Away team |
|---|---|---|---|
| 1 | Accrington Stanley | 1-1 | Altrincham |
| 2 | Aylesbury United | 0-2 | Aldershot Town |
| 3 | Banbury United | 0-2 | Cambridge City |
| 4 | Barrow | 1-1 | Burton Albion |
| 5 | Bashley | 1-1 | Burnham |
| 6 | Bedworth United | 1-4 | Gresley Rovers |
| 7 | Bishop's Stortford | 1-1 | Grays Athletic |
| 8 | Braintree Town | 1-1 | Basingstoke Town |
| 9 | Bromley | 1-1 | Tooting & Mitcham United |
| 10 | Canvey Island | 5-1 | St Albans City |
| 11 | Carshalton Athletic | 1-0 | Newport I O W |
| 12 | Chesham United | 4-0 | Weymouth |
| 13 | Cinderford Town | 0-2 | Gravesend & Northfleet |
| 14 | Dulwich Hamlet | 2-1 | Billericay Town |
| 15 | Eastbourne Borough | 0-0 | Bedford Town |
| 16 | Enfield | 2-2 | Histon |
| 17 | Fisher Athletic | 5-1 | Merthyr Tydfil |
| 18 | Grantham Town | 5-1 | Frickley Athletic |
| 19 | Gretna | 0-1 | Emley |
| 20 | Hampton & Richmond Borough | 2-2 | Harlow Town |
| 21 | Hednesford Town | 2-1 | Gateshead |
| 22 | Hyde United | 0-4 | Ilkeston Town |
| 23 | Kendal Town | 1-2 | Harrogate Town |
| 24 | King's Lynn | 4-1 | Ashton United |
| 25 | Kingstonian | 6-2 | Cirencester Town |
| 26 | Lancaster City | 2-1 | Hinckley United |
| 27 | Lincoln United | 0-1 | Solihull Borough |
| 28 | Maidenhead United | 1-2 | Hendon |
| 29 | Mangotsfield United | 3-1 | Dorchester Town |
| 30 | Moor Green | 2-1 | Trafford |
| 31 | North Ferriby United | 4-2 | Spennymoor United |
| 32 | Purfleet | 2-1 | Kettering Town |
| 33 | Runcorn | 4-2 | Farsley Celtic |
| 34 | Stafford Rangers | 0-3 | Vauxhall Motors |
| 35 | Stourport SWifts | 5-4 | Bishop Auckland |
| 36 | Sutton Coldfield Town | 0-3 | Tamworth |
| 37 | Thame United | 1-5 | Bognor Regis Town |
| 38 | Tiverton Town | 6-0 | Croydon |
| 39 | Walton & Hersham | 2-3 | Newport County |
| 40 | Welling United | 8-1 | Erith &Belvedere |
| 41 | Whitby Town | 1-2 | Blyth Spartans |
| 42 | Worksop Town | 3-2 | Marine |

=== Replays ===
| Tie | Home team | Score | Away team |
|---|---|---|---|
| 1 | Altrincham | 1-1 | Accrington Stanley |
| | (Altrincham won 3-1 on penalties) | | |
| 4 | Burton Albion | 5-0 | Barrow |
| 5 | Burnham | 1-4 | Bashley |
| 7 | Grays Athletic | 3-2 | Bishop's Stortford |
| 8 | Basingstoke Town | 0-2 | Braintree Town |
| 9 | Tooting & Mitcham United | 3-1 | Bromley |
| 15 | Bedford Town | 1-2 | Eastbourne Borough |
| 16 | Histon | 3-1 | Enfield |
| 20 | Harlow Town | 1-2 | Hampton & Richmond Borough |

== 3rd round ==
The teams from Football Conference entered in this round.

=== Ties ===
| Tie | Home team | Score | Away team |
|---|---|---|---|
| 1 | Bashley | 2-1 | Bognor Regis Town |
| 2 | Burton Albion | 3-0 | Blyth Spartans |
| 3 | Cambridge City | 1-1 | Hendon |
| 4 | Canvey Island | 2-2 | Purfleet |
| 5 | Chesham United | 2-2 | Hereford United |
| 6 | Chester City | 1-1 | Stourport Swifts |
| 7 | Dagenham & Redbridge | 1-0 | Eastbourne Borough |
| 8 | Doncaster Rovers | 2-0 | Harrogate Town |
| 9 | Dulwich Hamlet | 3-4 | Braintree Town |
| 10 | Farnborough Town | 1-1 | Carshalton Athletic |
| 11 | Fisher Athletic | 0-5 | Barnet |
| 12 | Forest Green Rovers | 1-1 | Aldershot Town |
| 13 | Grantham Town | 2-1 | Moor Green |
| 14 | Grays Athletic | 2-4 | Welling United |
| 15 | Hampton & Richmond Borough | 2-0 | Newport County |
| 16 | Histon | 1-1 | Gravesend & Northfleet |
| 17 | Ilkeston Town | 0-2 | Telford United |
| 18 | Leigh R M I | 2-2 | Emley |
| 19 | Mangotsfield United | 3-2 | Tooting & Mitcham United |
| 20 | Margate | 3-1 | Hayes |
| 21 | Morecambe | 2-0 | King's Lynn |
| 22 | North Ferriby United | 3-2 | Altrincham |
| 23 | Northwich Victoria | 3-1 | Boston United |
| 24 | Scarborough | 2-0 | Hednesford Town |
| 25 | Solihull Borough | 3-0 | Runcorn Halton |
| 26 | Southport | 1-1 | Gresley Rovers |
| 27 | Stalybridge Celtic | 1-1 | Nuneaton Borough |
| 28 | Stevenage Borough | 5-1 | Dover Athletic |
| 29 | Tiverton Town | 1-3 | Yeovil Town |
| 30 | Vauxhall Motors | 4-0 | Lancaster City |
| 31 | Woking | 2-1 | Kingstonian |
| 32 | Worksop Town | 4-3 | Tamworth |

=== Replays ===
| Tie | Home team | Score | Away team |
|---|---|---|---|
| 3 | Hendon | 2-0 | Cambridge City |
| 4 | Purfleet | 0-1 | Canvey Island |
| 5 | Hereford United | 4-0 | Chesham United |
| 6 | Stourport Swifts | 0-3 | Chester City |
| 10 | Carshalton Athletic | 0-5 | Farnborough Town |
| 12 | Aldershot | 2-3 | Forest Green Rovers |
| 16 | Gravesend & Northfleet | 3-1 | Histon |
| 18 | Emley | 1-4 | Leigh R M I |
| 26 | Gresley Rovers | 1-0 | Southport |
| 27 | Nuneaton Borough | 1-2 | Stalybridge Celtic |

== 4th round ==
=== Ties ===
| Tie | Home team | Score | Away team |
|---|---|---|---|
| 1 | Barnet | 0-0 | Scarborough |
| 2 | Chester City | 0-0 | Solihull Borough |
| 3 | Dagenham & Redbridge | 0-2 | Telford United |
| 4 | Farnborough Town | 1-1 | Burton Albion |
| 5 | Forest Green Rovers | 1-0 | Worksop Town |
| 6 | Grantham Town | 1-4 | Canvey Island |
| 7 | Gravesend & Northfleet | 2-1 | Hendon |
| 8 | Hereford United | 4-1 | Hampton & Richmond Borough |
| 9 | Mangotsfield United | 0-1 | Stalybridge Celtic |
| 10 | Margate | 2-0 | Leigh R M I |
| 11 | Morecambe | 5-0 | Gresley Rovers |
| 12 | North Ferriby United | 4-4 | Braintree Town |
| 13 | Stevenage Borough | 1-0 | Bashley |
| 14 | Vauxhall Motors | 0-4 | Northwich Victoria |
| 15 | Woking | 4-2 | Welling United |
| 16 | Yeovil Town | 1-1 | Doncaster Rovers |

=== Replays ===
| Tie | Home team | Score | Away team |
|---|---|---|---|
| 1 | Scarborough | 2-2 | Barnet |
| | (Scarborough won 5-3 on penalties) | | |
| 2 | Solihull Borough | 2-4 | Chester City |
| 4 | Burton Albion | 3-2 | Farnborough Town |
| 12 | Braintree Town | 2-2 | North Ferriby United |
| | (Braintree Town won 5-4 on penalties) | | |
| 16 | Doncaster Rovers | 4-5 | Yeovil Town |

== 5th round ==
=== Ties ===
| Tie | Home team | Score | Away team |
|---|---|---|---|
| 1 | Burton Albion | 3-0 | Woking |
| 2 | Chester City | 2-1 | Hereford United |
| 3 | Gravesend & Northfleet | 0-2 | Stalybridge Celtic |
| 4 | Margate | 1-1 | Braintree Town |
| 5 | Northwich Victoria | 3-2 | Telford United |
| 6 | Scarborough | 1-1 | Morecambe |
| 7 | Stevenage Borough | 3-2 | Forest Green Rovers |
| 8 | Yeovil Town | 2-1 | Canvey Island |

=== Replays ===
| Tie | Home team | Score | Away team |
|---|---|---|---|
| 1 | Morecambe | 3-0 | Scarborough |
| 3 | Braintree Town | 1-2 | Margate |

== QuarterFinal ==
| Tie | Home team | Score | Away team |
|---|---|---|---|
| 1 | Burton Albion | 2-0 | Chester City |
| 2 | Margate | 1-2 | Morecambe |
| 3 | Northwich Victoria | 0-2 | Yeovil Town |
| 4 | Stevenage Borough | 1-0 | Stalybridge Celtic |

== Semi-finals ==
=== First leg ===
6 April 2002
15:00 (BST)

| Morecambe | 1–2 | Stevenage Borough |

Christie Park
Attendance: 1,899

6 April 2002
15:00 (BST)

| Yeovil Town | 4–0 | Burton Albion |
|---|---|---|
| Grant 4'; Crittenden 37' (pen.); McIndoe 45'; Giles 84' |

Huish Park
Attendance: 5,614

=== Second leg ===
13 April 2002
15:00 (BST)

| Stevenage Borough | 2–0 | Morecambe |

Broadhall Way
Attendance: 3,119

Stevenage Borough win 4–1 on aggregate

14 April 2002
15:00 (BST)

| Burton Albion | 2–1 | Yeovil Town |
|---|---|---|
| Dale Anderson 53'; Farrell 72' | | Alford 57' |

Eton Park
Attendance: 4,026

Yeovil Town win 5–2 on aggregate

== Final ==
12 May 2002
12:00 (BST)

| Stevenage Borough | 0–2 | Yeovil Town |
|---|---|---|
| | | Alford 12'; Stansfield 66' |

Villa Park, Birmingham
Attendance: 18,809
Referee: Neale Barry
