= 1985–86 Western Football League =

Western Football League
- Season: 1985–86
- Champions: Exmouth Town (Premier Division); Portway Bristol (Division One)

The 1985–86 season was the 84th in the history of the Western Football League.

The league champions for the second time in their history were Exmouth Town. The champions of Division One for the second season running were Portway Bristol.

== Final tables ==
=== Premier Division ===
The Premier Division remained at 22 clubs after Devizes Town were relegated to the First Division. One club joined:

- Torrington, runners-up in the First Division.

Pos	Team	Pld	W	D	L	GF	GA	GD	Pts	Qualification
1	Exmouth Town (C)	42	30	9	3	95	31	+64	69	
2	Liskeard Athletic	42	31	6	5	103	34	+69	68	
3	Bideford	42	27	8	7	97	27	+70	62	
4	Saltash United	42	21	13	8	78	46	+32	55	
5	Chippenham Town	42	21	10	11	60	45	+15	52	
6	Mangotsfield United	42	18	13	11	87	58	+29	49	
7	Taunton Town	42	19	9	14	59	54	+5	47	
8	Dawlish Town	42	19	8	15	53	49	+4	45 (Note: Dawlish Town, Frome Town and Shepton Mallet Town each had one point deducted for fielding ineligible players.)	
9	Bristol City Reserves	42	18	6	18	74	61	+13	42	
10	Clevedon Town	42	12	18	12	55	47	+8	42	
11	Bristol Manor Farm	42	16	9	17	71	73	−2	41	
12	Minehead	42	16	9	17	55	70	−15	41	
13	Frome Town	42	14	12	16	49	62	−13	39	
14	Clandown	42	15	8	19	46	57	−11	38	
15	Torrington	42	13	11	18	51	62	−11	37	
16	Melksham Town	42	11	13	18	50	77	−27	35	
17	Barnstaple Town	42	13	7	22	46	68	−22	33	
18	Weston-super-Mare	42	12	8	22	69	90	−21	32	
19	Paulton Rovers	42	9	12	21	50	82	−32	30	
20	Plymouth Argyle Reserves	42	9	11	22	60	67	−7	29	
21	Chard Town	42	8	4	30	35	109	−74	20	
22	Shepton Mallet Town (R)	42	4	8	30	36	110	−74	15	Folded and reformed in the Somerset County League

(C) Champions; (R) Relegated

=== First Division ===
The First Division remained at 22 clubs, after Torrington were promoted to the Premier Division. One new club joined:

- Devizes Town, relegated from the Premier Division.

Pos	Team	Pld	W	D	L	GF	GA	GD	Pts	Promotion
1	Portway Bristol (C)	42	27	9	6	100	42	+58	63	
2	Radstock Town (P)	42	26	9	7	116	54	+62	61	Promoted to the Premier Division
3	Yeovil Town Reserves	42	25	7	10	79	36	+43	56 (Note: Yeovil Town Reserves had one point deducted for fielding an ineligible player.)	
4	Wimborne Town	42	18	13	11	77	51	+26	49	
5	Larkhall Athletic	42	18	11	13	72	56	+16	47	
6	Backwell United	42	19	9	14	63	47	+16	47	
7	Ottery St Mary	42	18	11	13	61	60	+1	47	
8	Swanage Town & Herston	42	18	9	15	91	79	+12	45	
9	Weymouth Reserves	42	18	8	16	84	78	+6	44	
10	Heavitree United	42	17	10	15	60	69	−9	44	
11	Bath City Reserves	42	16	10	16	74	69	+5	42	
12	Wellington	42	14	12	16	70	70	0	40	
13	Tiverton Town	42	16	7	19	68	74	−6	39	
14	Devizes Town	42	10	18	14	43	58	−15	38	
15	Elmore	42	12	13	17	56	78	−22	37	
16	Keynsham Town	42	9	18	15	37	53	−16	36	
17	Welton Rovers	42	13	9	20	61	84	−23	35	
18	Glastonbury	42	12	11	19	52	79	−27	35	
19	Ilfracombe Town	42	10	14	18	55	69	−14	34	
20	Westbury United	42	10	10	22	55	82	−27	30	
21	Odd Down	42	9	12	21	57	90	−33	30	
22	Warminster Town	42	9	6	27	40	93	−53	24	

Rules for classification: The system of using goal difference to separate two teams tied on points was used. The points system: 2 points for a win, 1 point for a draw and 0 points for losing.
(C) Champions; (P) Promoted
