= 1994–95 Western Football League =

Western Football League
- Season: 1994–95
- Champions: Tiverton Town (Premier Division); Brislington (Division One)

The 1994–95 season was the 93rd in the history of the Western Football League.

The league champions for the second time in their history (and the second season running) were Tiverton Town. The champions of Division One were Brislington.

== Final tables ==
=== Premier Division ===
The Premier Division remained at 18 clubs after Exmouth Town and Minehead were relegated to the First Division. Two clubs joined:

- Barnstaple Town, champions of the First Division.
- Bridport, runners-up in the First Division.

Pos	Team	Pld	W	D	L	GF	GA	GD	Pts	Qualification
1	Tiverton Town (C)	34	28	3	3	128	23	+105	87	
2	Elmore	34	27	5	2	94	39	+55	86	
3	Taunton Town	34	15	12	7	59	28	+31	57	
4	Barnstaple Town	34	16	8	10	58	48	+10	56	
5	Westbury United	34	16	6	12	71	53	+18	54	
6	Mangotsfield United	34	16	6	12	51	50	+1	54	
7	Paulton Rovers	34	15	7	12	62	71	−9	52	
8	Chippenham Town	34	14	9	11	54	54	0	51	
9	Bristol Manor Farm	34	14	6	14	51	48	+3	48	
10	Liskeard Athletic	34	12	9	13	59	55	+4	45	Left to join the South Western League
11	Saltash United	34	12	9	13	38	43	−5	45	Left to join the South Western League
12	Odd Down Athletic	34	11	9	14	47	53	−6	42	
13	Bridport	34	11	6	17	44	59	−15	39	
14	Calne Town	34	11	3	20	36	68	−32	36	
15	Bideford	34	10	5	19	48	69	−21	35	
16	Crediton United	34	8	6	20	43	77	−34	30	
17	Torrington	34	6	10	18	49	89	−40	28	
18	Frome Town	34	3	3	28	36	101	−65	12	

(C) Champions

=== First Division ===
The First Division was increased from 20 clubs to 21, after Barnstaple Town and Bridport were promoted to the Premier Division, and Ottery St Mary and Radstock Town left the league. Five new clubs joined:

- Amesbury Town, promoted from the Wiltshire County League.
- Bridgwater Town, promoted from the Somerset Senior League – rejoining the league after leaving in 1982.
- Exmouth Town, relegated from the Premier Division.
- Melksham Town, promoted from the Wiltshire County League – rejoining the league after leaving in 1993.
- Minehead, relegated from the Premier Division.

Pos	Team	Pld	W	D	L	GF	GA	GD	Pts	Promotion
1	Brislington (C, P)	40	30	7	3	113	25	+88	97	Promoted to the Premier Division
2	Glastonbury	40	26	8	6	91	35	+56	86	
3	Backwell United (P)	40	26	8	6	75	33	+42	86	Promoted to the Premier Division
4	Warminster Town	40	26	7	7	93	42	+51	85	
5	Chard Town	40	25	10	5	74	35	+39	85	
6	Bridgwater Town	40	18	13	9	62	47	+15	67	
7	Keynsham Town	40	17	11	12	73	62	+11	62	
8	Bishop Sutton	40	17	7	16	61	61	0	58	
9	Exmouth Town	40	16	6	18	55	63	−8	54	
10	Melksham Town	40	14	10	16	62	61	+1	52	
11	Clyst Rovers	40	15	5	20	60	84	−24	50	
12	Amesbury Town	40	14	7	19	67	61	+6	49	
13	Wellington	40	14	7	19	55	59	−4	49	
14	Ilfracombe Town	40	13	8	19	64	58	+6	47	
15	Heavitree United	40	12	7	21	52	94	−42	43	
16	Welton Rovers	40	11	9	20	50	62	−12	42	
17	Devizes Town	40	11	7	22	57	82	−25	40	
18	Pewsey Vale	40	10	8	22	52	77	−25	38	
19	Larkhall Athletic	40	8	8	24	39	89	−50	32	
20	Dawlish Town	40	8	8	24	41	92	−51	32	
21	Minehead	40	5	7	28	24	98	−74	22	

Rules for classification: The system of using goal difference to separate two teams tied on points was used. The points system: 3 points for a win, 1 point for a draw and 0 points for losing.
(C) Champions; (P) Promoted
