= 1990–91 Western Football League =

Western Football League
- Season: 1990–91
- Champions: Mangotsfield United (Premier Division); Minehead (Division One)

The 1990–91 season was the 89th in the history of the Western Football League.

The league champions for the first time in their history were Mangotsfield United. The champions of Division One were Minehead after finishing bottom the previous season.

== Final tables ==
=== Premier Division ===
The Premier Division remained at 21 clubs after Swanage Town & Herston transferred to the Wessex League. One club joined:

- Ottery St Mary, champions of the First Division.

Pos	Team	Pld	W	D	L	GF	GA	GD	Pts	Relegation
1	Mangotsfield United (C)	40	28	8	4	113	39	+74	92	
2	Torrington	40	25	7	8	91	41	+50	82	
3	Plymouth Argyle Reserves	40	25	8	7	100	28	+72	81 (Note: Plymouth Argyle Reserves had two points deducted for fielding an ineligible player.)	
4	Tiverton Town	40	22	11	7	85	45	+40	77	
5	Weston-super-Mare	40	20	10	10	74	57	+17	70	
6	Saltash United	40	20	6	14	67	46	+21	66	
7	Taunton Town	40	18	9	13	62	49	+13	63	
8	Liskeard Athletic	40	18	7	15	85	69	+16	61	
9	Dawlish Town	40	15	16	9	58	49	+9	61	
10	Paulton Rovers	40	16	11	13	74	60	+14	59	
11	Clevedon Town	40	16	10	14	52	55	−3	58	
12	Bideford	40	13	10	17	61	76	−15	49	
13	Frome Town	40	14	6	20	56	78	−22	48	
14	Bristol Manor Farm	40	12	9	19	52	66	−14	45	
15	Welton Rovers	40	11	11	18	40	61	−21	44	
16	Chard Town	40	11	10	19	48	86	−38	43	
17	Chippenham Town	40	10	12	18	42	64	−22	42	
18	Ottery St Mary	40	11	4	25	43	88	−45	37	
19	Exmouth Town	40	9	8	23	59	93	−34	35	
20	Barnstaple Town (R)	40	8	10	22	44	86	−42	34	Relegated to the First Division
21	Radstock Town (R)	40	4	5	31	46	116	−70	17	Relegated to the First Division

(C) Champions; (R) Relegated

=== First Division ===
The First Division was increased from 20 clubs to 21, after Ottery St Mary were promoted to the Premier Division. Two new clubs joined:

- Crediton United, promoted from the Devon & Exeter League.
- Torquay United Reserves, rejoining after leaving the league in 1982.

Pos	Team	Pld	W	D	L	GF	GA	GD	Pts	Promotion
1	Minehead (C, P)	40	28	9	3	102	42	+60	93	Promoted to the Premier Division
2	Elmore (P)	40	24	6	10	89	47	+42	78	Promoted to the Premier Division
3	Calne Town	40	25	2	13	85	55	+30	77	
4	Odd Down	40	22	10	8	59	36	+23	76	
5	Westbury United	40	21	9	10	60	44	+16	72	
6	Bridport	40	18	11	11	65	48	+17	65	
7	Torquay United Reserves	40	17	10	13	62	52	+10	61	
8	Devizes Town	40	17	10	13	68	66	+2	61	
9	Ilfracombe Town	40	15	12	13	62	54	+8	57	
10	Crediton United	40	14	13	13	55	48	+7	55	
11	Wellington	40	15	10	15	58	55	+3	55	
12	Bath City Reserves	40	14	11	15	67	64	+3	53	
13	Keynsham Town	40	14	9	17	59	58	+1	51	
14	Clandown	40	14	8	18	43	71	−28	50	
15	Melksham Town	40	13	10	17	54	60	−6	49	
16	Backwell United	40	11	9	20	56	70	−14	42	
17	Yeovil Town Reserves	40	10	6	24	59	91	−32	36	Left at the end of the season
18	Warminster Town	40	9	9	22	39	74	−35	36	
19	Larkhall Athletic	40	9	8	23	38	70	−32	35	
20	Heavitree United	40	6	12	22	32	81	−49	30	
21	Glastonbury	40	5	14	21	39	65	−26	29	

Rules for classification: The system of using goal difference to separate two teams tied on points was used. The points system: 3 points for a win, 1 point for a draw and 0 points for losing.
(C) Champions; (P) Promoted
