= 1993–94 Western Football League =

Western Football League
- Season: 1993–94
- Champions: Tiverton Town (Premier Division); Barnstaple Town (Division One)

The 1993–94 season was the 92nd in the history of the Western Football League.

The league champions for the first time in their history were Tiverton Town, who finished the season unbeaten. The champions of Division One were Barnstaple Town.

== Final tables ==
=== Premier Division ===
The Premier Division was reduced from 20 to 18 clubs after Clevedon Town were promoted to the Southern League, Chard Town and Dawlish Town were relegated to the First Division, and Plymouth Argyle Reserves and Torquay United Reserves also left. Three clubs joined:

- Calne Town, runners-up in the First Division.
- Crediton United, third-placed in the First Division.
- Odd Down Athletic, champions of the First Division, changing their name from Odd Down F.C.

Pos	Team	Pld	W	D	L	GF	GA	GD	Pts	Relegation
1	Tiverton Town (C)	34	31	3	0	125	22	+103	96	
2	Taunton Town	34	26	2	6	98	38	+60	80	
3	Mangotsfield United	34	19	6	9	75	40	+35	63	
4	Paulton Rovers	34	18	7	9	55	42	+13	61	
5	Saltash United	34	18	6	10	67	36	+31	60	
6	Torrington	34	16	10	8	66	46	+20	58	
7	Liskeard Athletic	34	16	5	13	66	50	+16	53	
8	Chippenham Town	34	14	7	13	58	51	+7	49	
9	Bideford	34	13	8	13	58	69	−11	44 (Note: Bideford had three points deducted for fielding an ineligible player.)	
10	Odd Down Athletic	34	10	12	12	59	58	+1	42	
11	Crediton United	34	10	8	16	42	65	−23	38	
12	Westbury United	34	9	9	16	40	61	−21	36	
13	Bristol Manor Farm	34	11	3	20	51	71	−20	36	
14	Calne Town	34	8	9	17	50	76	−26	33	
15	Frome Town	34	9	6	19	33	61	−28	33	
16	Elmore	34	8	8	18	51	83	−32	32	
17	Exmouth Town (R)	34	6	4	24	35	93	−58	22	Relegated to the First Division
18	Minehead (R)	34	6	3	25	38	105	−67	15 (Note: Minehead had six points deducted for fielding an ineligible player.)	Relegated to the First Division

(C) Champions; (R) Relegated

=== First Division ===
The First Division was reduced from 21 clubs to 20, after Calne Town, Crediton United and Odd Down were promoted to the Premier Division, and Melksham Town left the league. Three new clubs joined:

- Chard Town, relegated from the Premier Division.
- Dawlish Town, relegated from the Premier Division.
- Pewsey Vale, promoted from the Wiltshire County League.

Pos	Team	Pld	W	D	L	GF	GA	GD	Pts	Promotion
1	Barnstaple Town (C, P)	38	27	8	3	107	39	+68	89	Promoted to the Premier Division
2	Bridport (P)	38	24	7	7	90	46	+44	79	Promoted to the Premier Division
3	Brislington	38	23	8	7	73	35	+38	77	
4	Pewsey Vale	38	20	11	7	84	47	+37	71	
5	Keynsham Town	38	21	7	10	80	50	+30	70	
6	Clyst Rovers	38	16	15	7	68	50	+18	63	
7	Backwell United	38	18	8	12	64	45	+19	62	
8	Welton Rovers	38	16	10	12	73	53	+20	58	
9	Devizes Town	38	16	10	12	64	61	+3	58	
10	Chard Town	38	16	9	13	48	51	−3	57	
11	Ilfracombe Town	38	16	8	14	70	42	+28	56	
12	Bishop Sutton	38	12	14	12	58	48	+10	50	
13	Glastonbury	38	14	8	16	68	66	+2	50	
14	Larkhall Athletic	38	12	7	19	52	69	−17	43	
15	Warminster Town	38	8	11	19	47	57	−10	35	
16	Wellington	38	9	6	23	51	92	−41	33	
17	Dawlish Town	38	9	5	24	46	125	−79	32	
18	Heavitree United	38	8	7	23	47	90	−43	31	
19	Radstock Town	38	8	6	24	44	73	−29	30	Left to join the Somerset Senior League
20	Ottery St Mary	38	2	5	31	37	132	−95	11	Left to join the Devon County League

Rules for classification: The system of using goal difference to separate two teams tied on points was used. The points system: 3 points for a win, 1 point for a draw and 0 points for losing.
(C) Champions; (P) Promoted
