= 1988–89 Western Football League =

Western Football League
- Season: 1988–89
- Champions: Saltash United (Premier Division); Larkhall Athletic (Division One)

The 1988–89 season was the 87th in the history of the Western Football League.

The league champions for the third time in their history were Saltash United. The champions of Division One were Larkhall Athletic.

== Final tables ==
=== Premier Division ===
The Premier Division was reduced from 22 to 21 clubs after Melksham Town and Clandown were relegated to the First Division, and Bristol City Reserves also left. Two clubs joined:

- Chard Town, runners-up in the First Division.
- Welton Rovers, champions of the First Division.

Pos	Team	Pld	W	D	L	GF	GA	GD	Pts	Relegation
1	Saltash United (C)	40	26	10	4	90	35	+55	62	
2	Exmouth Town	40	29	4	7	79	43	+36	62	
3	Taunton Town	40	23	10	7	95	41	+54	56	
4	Liskeard Athletic	40	20	12	8	46	25	+21	52	
5	Plymouth Argyle Reserves	40	19	13	8	84	39	+45	51	
6	Bristol Manor Farm	40	20	7	13	72	49	+23	47	
7	Weston-super-Mare	40	17	8	15	73	52	+21	42	
8	Paulton Rovers	40	14	14	12	60	53	+7	42	
9	Barnstaple Town	40	17	7	16	61	54	+7	41	
10	Swanage Town & Herston	40	15	10	15	71	73	−2	40	
11	Clevedon Town	40	16	7	17	63	70	−7	39	
12	Chippenham Town	40	11	14	15	48	52	−4	36	
13	Welton Rovers	40	13	10	17	50	57	−7	36	
14	Radstock Town	40	9	18	13	38	65	−27	36	
15	Chard Town	40	12	11	17	49	78	−29	35	
16	Bideford	40	12	9	19	49	72	−23	33	
17	Frome Town	40	11	10	19	54	80	−26	32	
18	Mangotsfield United	40	10	9	21	53	74	−21	29	
19	Dawlish Town	40	11	7	22	48	69	−21	29	
20	Torrington	40	7	12	21	46	84	−38	26	
21	Minehead (R)	40	5	4	31	30	94	−64	14	Relegated to the First Division

(C) Champions; (R) Relegated

=== First Division ===
The First Division was increased from 19 to 20 clubs, after Chard Town and Welton Rovers were promoted to the Premier Division. Three new clubs joined:

- Bridport, promoted from the Dorset Combination.
- Clandown, relegated from the Premier Division.
- Melksham Town, relegated from the Premier Division.

Pos	Team	Pld	W	D	L	GF	GA	GD	Pts	Promotion
1	Larkhall Athletic (C)	38	25	11	2	88	40	+48	61	
2	Tiverton Town (P)	38	27	6	5	108	33	+75	60	Promoted to the Premier Division
3	Bridport	38	24	7	7	90	35	+55	55	
4	Calne Town	38	17	14	7	58	34	+24	48	
5	Devizes Town	38	19	9	10	55	39	+16	47	
6	Odd Down	38	17	12	9	57	45	+12	46	
7	Wellington	38	17	11	10	72	56	+16	45	
8	Ilfracombe Town	38	16	13	9	59	47	+12	45	
9	Backwell United	38	15	8	15	49	46	+3	38	
10	Keynsham Town	38	11	13	14	55	55	0	35	
11	Heavitree United	38	13	9	16	54	58	−4	35	
12	Melksham Town	38	11	13	14	43	49	−6	35	
13	Ottery St Mary	38	12	8	18	46	71	−25	32	
14	Clandown	38	10	11	17	47	63	−16	31	
15	Bath City Reserves	38	11	7	20	60	67	−7	29	
16	Westbury United	38	10	9	19	59	66	−7	29	
17	Yeovil Town Reserves	38	10	9	19	42	49	−7	29	
18	Warminster Town	38	5	11	22	34	84	−50	21	
19	Glastonbury	38	6	9	23	38	97	−59	21	
20	Elmore	38	8	2	28	38	118	−80	18	

Rules for classification: The system of using goal difference to separate two teams tied on points was used. The points system: 2 points for a win, 1 point for a draw and 0 points for losing.
(C) Champions; (P) Promoted
