= 1986–87 Western Football League =

Western Football League
- Season: 1986–87
- Champions: Saltash United (Premier Division); Swanage Town & Herston (Division One)

The 1986–87 season was the 85th in the history of the Western Football League.

The league champions for the second time in their history were Saltash United. The champions of Division One were Swanage Town & Herston.

== Final tables ==
=== Premier Division ===
The Premier Division remained at 22 clubs after Shepton Mallet Town were relegated and left to join the Somerset County League. One club joined:

- Radstock Town, runners-up in the First Division.

Pos	Team	Pld	W	D	L	GF	GA	GD	Pts	Relegation
1	Saltash United (C)	42	31	8	3	101	40	+61	70	
2	Exmouth Town	42	22	10	10	82	62	+20	54	
3	Bristol City Reserves	42	23	5	14	94	57	+37	51	
4	Liskeard Athletic	42	20	9	13	69	45	+24	49	
5	Bristol Manor Farm	42	19	10	13	58	46	+12	48	
6	Bideford	42	21	4	17	58	57	+1	46	
7	Plymouth Argyle Reserves	42	21	4	17	92	55	+37	45 (Note: Plymouth Argyle Reserves had one point deducted for fielding an ineligible player.)	
8	Taunton Town	42	17	9	16	61	64	−3	43	
9	Chippenham Town	42	14	14	14	53	50	+3	42	
10	Mangotsfield United	42	17	8	17	69	71	−2	42	
11	Barnstaple Town	42	15	12	15	55	66	−11	42	
12	Clevedon Town	42	14	13	15	58	60	−2	41	
13	Weston-super-Mare	42	13	13	16	66	70	−4	39	
14	Dawlish Town	42	14	10	18	63	62	+1	38	
15	Torrington	42	14	10	18	61	71	−10	38	
16	Paulton Rovers	42	14	8	20	55	72	−17	36	
17	Radstock Town	42	11	13	18	55	73	−18	35	
18	Melksham Town	42	10	15	17	39	64	−25	35	
19	Frome Town	42	12	10	20	50	65	−15	34	
20	Clandown	42	12	10	20	40	59	−19	34	
21	Minehead	42	10	12	20	53	86	−33	32	
22	Chard Town (R)	42	11	7	24	52	89	−37	29	Relegated to the First Division

(C) Champions; (R) Relegated

=== First Division ===
The First Division remained at 22 clubs, after Radstock Town were promoted to the Premier Division. One new club joined:

- Calne Town, joining from the Wiltshire League.

Pos	Team	Pld	W	D	L	GF	GA	GD	Pts	Promotion
1	Swanage Town & Herston (C, P)	42	25	12	5	93	52	+41	62	Promoted to the Premier Division
2	Portway Bristol	42	25	8	9	103	51	+52	58	Disbanded at the end of the season
3	Bath City Reserves	42	25	6	11	85	58	+27	56	
4	Yeovil Town Reserves	42	21	10	11	85	53	+32	52	
5	Wimborne Town	42	23	6	13	96	58	+38	51 (Note: Wimborne Town, Devizes Town, Warminster Town, Weymouth Reserves and Heavitree United each had one point deducted for fielding ineligible players.)	Transferred to the Wessex League
6	Devizes Town	42	21	10	11	62	43	+19	51	
7	Larkhall Athletic	42	21	8	13	71	53	+18	50	
8	Welton Rovers	42	20	6	16	66	53	+13	46	
9	Backwell United	42	15	15	12	55	53	+2	45	
10	Warminster Town	42	18	10	14	72	71	+1	45	
11	Ottery St Mary	42	17	6	19	66	68	−2	40	
12	Odd Down	42	13	13	16	57	65	−8	39	
13	Keynsham Town	42	16	7	19	57	69	−12	39	
14	Elmore	42	14	10	18	60	69	−9	38	
15	Tiverton Town	42	12	12	18	66	79	−13	36	
16	Weymouth Reserves	42	12	12	18	75	87	−12	35	Left at the end of the season
17	Wellington	42	14	7	21	55	67	−12	35	
18	Westbury United	42	12	10	20	78	87	−9	34	
19	Calne Town	42	11	12	19	54	73	−19	34	
20	Ilfracombe Town	42	11	8	23	40	68	−28	30	
21	Heavitree United	42	9	9	24	48	96	−48	26	
22	Glastonbury	42	5	7	30	38	109	−71	17	

Rules for classification: The system of using goal difference to separate two teams tied on points was used. The points system: 2 points for a win, 1 point for a draw and 0 points for losing.
(C) Champions; (P) Promoted
