= 1999–2000 Western Football League =

Western Football League
- Season: 1999–2000
- Champions: Taunton Town (Premier Division); Devizes Town (Division One)

The 1999–2000 season was the 98th in the history of the Western Football League.

The league champions for the fifth time in their history (and the second season running) were Taunton Town, but runners-up Mangotsfield United took promotion to the Southern League. The champions of Division One were Devizes Town after they finished the season unbeaten.

== Final tables ==
=== Premier Division ===
The Premier Division was reduced from 20 clubs to 19 after Tiverton Town were promoted to the Southern League, and Calne Town and Keynsham Town were relegated to the First Division. Two clubs joined:

- Dawlish Town, runners-up in the First Division.
- Minehead Town, champions of the First Division.

Pos	Team	Pld	W	D	L	GF	GA	GD	Pts	Promotion
1	Taunton Town (C)	36	30	4	2	116	37	+79	94	
2	Mangotsfield United (P)	36	23	9	4	95	31	+64	78	Promoted to the Southern League
3	Brislington	36	20	5	11	64	43	+21	65	
4	Chippenham Town	36	18	9	9	69	41	+28	63	
5	Paulton Rovers	36	16	11	9	53	34	+19	59	
6	Melksham Town	36	15	11	10	50	46	+4	56	
7	Backwell United	36	15	9	12	50	44	+6	54	
8	Bridport	36	12	13	11	56	56	0	49	
9	Dawlish Town	36	12	11	13	51	45	+6	47	
10	Yeovil Town Reserves	36	11	14	11	64	63	+1	47	
11	Elmore	36	13	8	15	51	63	−12	47	
12	Bishop Sutton	36	13	4	19	51	73	−22	43	
13	Bideford	36	10	10	16	46	68	−22	40	
14	Bridgwater Town	36	10	8	18	42	53	−11	38	
15	Barnstaple Town	36	9	7	20	35	51	−16	34	
16	Westbury United	36	9	7	20	39	67	−28	34	
17	Bristol Manor Farm	36	8	9	19	48	78	−30	33	
18	Odd Down	36	9	6	21	36	82	−46	33	
19	Minehead Town	36	9	5	22	60	101	−41	32	

(C) Champions; (P) Promoted

=== First Division ===
The First Division was reduced from 19 clubs to 17 after Dawlish Town and Minehead Town were promoted to the Premier Division, and Glastonbury and Heavitree United left the league. Two clubs joined:

- Calne Town, relegated from the Premier Division.
- Keynsham Town, relegated from the Premier Division.

Pos	Team	Pld	W	D	L	GF	GA	GD	Pts	Promotion
1	Devizes Town (C, P)	32	23	9	0	88	30	+58	78	Promoted to the Premier Division
2	Welton Rovers (P)	32	22	4	6	74	19	+55	70	Promoted to the Premier Division
3	Clyst Rovers	32	19	5	8	83	39	+44	62	
4	Exmouth Town	32	16	9	7	67	43	+24	57	
5	Keynsham Town	32	16	9	7	48	34	+14	57	
6	Bitton	32	16	6	10	60	47	+13	54	
7	Torrington	32	16	6	10	62	50	+12	54	
8	Street	32	13	10	9	56	40	+16	49	
9	Larkhall Athletic	32	11	8	13	45	55	−10	41	
10	Wellington	32	11	7	14	46	44	+2	40	
11	Ilfracombe Town	32	12	2	18	59	65	−6	38	
12	Warminster Town	32	10	6	16	40	77	−37	36	
13	Calne Town	32	10	5	17	48	71	−23	35	
14	Pewsey Vale	32	10	2	20	51	88	−37	32	
15	Chard Town	32	8	7	17	31	52	−21	31	
16	Corsham Town	32	5	5	22	36	86	−50	20	
17	Frome Town	32	3	2	27	30	84	−54	11	

Rules for classification: The system of using goal difference to separate two teams tied on points was used. The points system: 3 points for a win, 1 point for a draw and 0 points for losing.
(C) Champions; (P) Promoted
