= 1982–83 Western Football League =

Western Football League
- Season: 1982–83
- Champions: Bideford (Premier Division); Bristol Manor Farm (Division One)

The 1982–83 season was the 81st in the history of the Western Football League.

The league champions for the fifth time in their history, and the second season in succession, were Bideford. The champions of Division One were Bristol Manor Farm.

== Final tables ==
=== Premier Division ===
The Premier Division remained at twenty clubs after Bridgwater Town joined the Southern League, and Mangotsfield United and Welton Rovers were relegated to the First Division. Three clubs joined:

- Exmouth Town, runners-up in the First Division.
- Plymouth Argyle Reserves, from The Football Combination – returning to the league after leaving in 1932.
- Shepton Mallet Town, champions of the First Division.

Pos	Team	Pld	W	D	L	GF	GA	GD	Pts	Relegation
1	Bideford	38	26	9	3	67	32	+35	61	
2	Frome Town	38	23	10	5	75	34	+41	56	
3	Dawlish Town	38	20	8	10	68	47	+21	48	
4	Clandown	38	19	9	10	54	39	+15	47	
5	Saltash United	38	14	18	6	50	39	+11	46	
6	Falmouth Town	38	16	13	9	63	57	+6	45	Left at the end of the season
7	Plymouth Argyle Reserves	38	15	14	9	67	41	+26	44	
8	Barnstaple Town	38	18	6	14	67	57	+10	42	
9	Liskeard Athletic	38	16	9	13	69	47	+22	41	
10	Weston-super-Mare	38	15	11	12	57	46	+11	41	
11	Shepton Mallet Town	38	15	4	19	50	55	−5	34	
12	Devizes Town	38	12	9	17	50	58	−8	33	
13	Chippenham Town	38	12	8	18	40	54	−14	32	
14	Clevedon Town	38	9	12	17	36	56	−20	30	
15	Bridport	38	8	13	17	49	60	−11	29	Left at the end of the season
16	Exmouth Town	38	10	9	19	40	59	−19	29	
17	Melksham Town	38	8	13	17	43	63	−20	29	
18	Wellington	38	8	12	18	46	74	−28	28	
19	Keynsham Town (R)	38	7	11	20	32	68	−36	25	Relegated to Division One
20	Portway Bristol (R)	38	8	4	26	35	72	−37	20	Relegated to Division One

(R) Relegated

=== First Division ===
The First Division remained at nineteen clubs after Ilminster Town and Torquay United Reserves left the league, and Exmouth Town and Shepton Mallet Town were promoted to the Premier Division. Four new clubs joined:

- Bristol City Reserves, returning to the league after leaving in 1965.
- Mangotsfield United, relegated from the Premier Division.
- Welton Rovers, relegated from the Premier Division.
- Weymouth Reserves, returning to the league after leaving in 1970.

Pos	Team	Pld	W	D	L	GF	GA	GD	Pts	Promotion
1	Bristol Manor Farm (P)	36	26	7	3	85	31	+54	59	Promoted to the Premier Division
2	Mangotsfield United (P)	36	24	8	4	75	32	+43	56	Promoted to the Premier Division
3	Paulton Rovers	36	20	12	4	75	37	+38	52	
4	Odd Down	36	19	9	8	56	41	+15	47	
5	Glastonbury	36	15	15	6	69	47	+22	45	
6	Swanage Town & Herston	36	21	1	14	83	54	+29	43	
7	Wimborne Town	36	17	9	10	74	51	+23	43	
8	Bath City Reserves	36	14	9	13	64	49	+15	37	
9	Chard Town	36	15	5	16	54	50	+4	35	
10	Weymouth Reserves	36	12	8	16	43	56	−13	32	
11	Welton Rovers	36	12	8	16	46	61	−15	32	
12	Yeovil Town Reserves	36	14	3	19	49	55	−6	31	
13	Bristol City Reserves	36	9	11	16	57	77	−20	29	
14	Elmore	36	12	4	20	48	65	−17	28	
15	Heavitree United	36	11	5	20	40	66	−26	27	
16	Larkhall Athletic	36	9	8	19	40	64	−24	26	
17	Radstock Town	36	9	6	21	50	79	−29	24	
18	Tiverton Town	36	8	5	23	42	85	−43	21	
19	Ottery St Mary	36	8	1	27	35	85	−50	17	

Rules for classification: The system of using goal difference to separate two teams tied on points was used. The points system: 2 points for a win, 1 point for a draw and 0 points for losing.
(P) Promoted
