= 1997–98 Western Football League =

Western Football League
- Season: 1997–98
- Champions: Tiverton Town (Premier Division); Bishop Sutton (Division One)

The 1997–98 season was the 96th in the history of the Western Football League.

The league champions for the fourth time in their history (and the fourth time in five seasons) were Tiverton Town, who finished the season unbeaten. The champions of Division One were Bishop Sutton.

== Final tables ==
=== Premier Division ===
The Premier Division was increased from 18 to 20 clubs after there was no relegation to the First Division last season. Two clubs joined:

- Keynsham Town, runners-up in the First Division.
- Melksham Town, champions of the First Division.

Pos	Team	Pld	W	D	L	GF	GA	GD	Pts	Relegation
1	Tiverton Town (C)	38	36	2	0	154	20	+134	110	
2	Taunton Town	38	31	3	4	107	28	+79	96	
3	Melksham Town	38	22	7	9	75	37	+38	73	
4	Bridgwater Town	38	22	6	10	73	43	+30	72	
5	Paulton Rovers	38	19	6	13	76	69	+7	63	
6	Mangotsfield United	38	18	8	12	76	50	+26	62	
7	Barnstaple Town	38	18	5	15	79	64	+15	59	
8	Brislington	38	17	8	13	62	55	+7	59	
9	Calne Town	38	16	9	13	68	67	+1	57	
10	Backwell United	38	15	7	16	70	68	+2	52	
11	Bridport	38	16	4	18	62	72	−10	52	
12	Chippenham Town	38	13	11	14	53	57	−4	50	
13	Bideford	38	14	6	18	68	90	−22	48	
14	Elmore	38	10	8	20	54	100	−46	38	
15	Westbury United	38	9	8	21	39	65	−26	35	
16	Bristol Manor Farm	38	8	10	20	37	73	−36	34	
17	Keynsham Town	38	10	4	24	46	94	−48	34	
18	Odd Down	38	9	6	23	33	80	−47	33	
19	Chard Town (R)	38	8	8	22	44	77	−33	32	Relegated to the First Division
20	Torrington (R)	38	2	8	28	21	88	−67	14	Relegated to the First Division

(C) Champions; (R) Relegated

=== First Division ===
The First Division was reduced from 20 clubs to 19, after Keynsham Town and Melksham Town were promoted to the Premier Division, and Amesbury Town left the league. Two clubs joined:

- Bitton, promoted from the Gloucestershire County League.
- Street, promoted from the Somerset Senior League – rejoining after leaving the league in 1960.

Pos	Team	Pld	W	D	L	GF	GA	GD	Pts	Promotion
1	Bishop Sutton (C, P)	36	26	8	2	86	25	+61	86	Promoted to the Premier Division
2	Yeovil Town Reserves (P)	36	24	6	6	95	47	+48	78	Promoted to the Premier Division
3	Devizes Town	36	22	7	7	83	38	+45	73	
4	Street	36	21	7	8	61	32	+29	70	
5	Clyst Rovers	36	20	10	6	89	39	+50	67 (Note: Clyst Rovers, Dawlish Town and Pewsey Vale all had three points deducted for fielding ineligible players.)	
6	Minehead	36	16	14	6	60	39	+21	62	
7	Dawlish Town	36	17	10	9	78	48	+30	58	
8	Crediton United	36	15	8	13	65	67	−2	53	Left to join the Devon County League
9	Exmouth Town	36	15	6	15	68	60	+8	51	
10	Bitton	36	14	8	14	55	53	+2	50	
11	Wellington	36	13	10	13	72	54	+18	49	
12	Ilfracombe Town	36	14	7	15	75	67	+8	49	
13	Larkhall Athletic	36	12	7	17	45	58	−13	43	
14	Welton Rovers	36	9	6	21	51	78	−27	33	
15	Warminster Town	36	9	5	22	40	83	−43	32	
16	Glastonbury	36	9	4	23	41	86	−45	31	
17	Frome Town	36	8	6	22	47	74	−27	30	
18	Heavitree United	36	3	7	26	34	135	−101	16	
19	Pewsey Vale	36	3	8	25	40	102	−62	14	

Rules for classification: The system of using goal difference to separate two teams tied on points was used. The points system: 3 points for a win, 1 point for a draw and 0 points for losing.
(C) Champions; (P) Promoted
