= 1995–96 Western Football League =

Western Football League
- Season: 1995–96
- Champions: Taunton Town (Premier Division); Bridgwater Town (Division One)

The 1994–95 season was the 94th in the history of the Western Football League.

The league champions for the third time in their history were Taunton Town. The champions of Division One were Bridgwater Town.

== Final tables ==
=== Premier Division ===
The Premier Division remained at 18 clubs after Liskeard Athletic and Saltash United left the league. Two clubs joined:

- Backwell United, third-placed in the First Division.
- Brislington, champions of the First Division.

| Pos | Team | Pld | W | D | L | GF | GA | GD | Pts | Relegation |
|---|---|---|---|---|---|---|---|---|---|---|
| 1 | Taunton Town (C) | 34 | 25 | 7 | 2 | 84 | 20 | +64 | 82 | |
| 2 | Tiverton Town | 34 | 25 | 4 | 5 | 101 | 34 | +67 | 79 | |
| 3 | Mangotsfield United | 34 | 22 | 7 | 5 | 88 | 23 | +65 | 73 | |
| 4 | Torrington | 34 | 23 | 4 | 7 | 64 | 37 | +27 | 73 | |
| 5 | Brislington | 34 | 17 | 4 | 13 | 60 | 41 | +19 | 55 | |
| 6 | Bideford | 34 | 16 | 7 | 11 | 63 | 47 | +16 | 55 | |
| 7 | Backwell United | 34 | 15 | 7 | 12 | 54 | 46 | +8 | 52 | |
| 8 | Paulton Rovers | 34 | 14 | 10 | 10 | 59 | 53 | +6 | 52 | |
| 9 | Calne Town | 34 | 14 | 9 | 11 | 41 | 40 | +1 | 51 | |
| 10 | Chippenham Town | 34 | 11 | 12 | 11 | 53 | 41 | +12 | 45 | |
| 11 | Bridport | 34 | 13 | 5 | 16 | 51 | 60 | −9 | 44 | |
| 12 | Bristol Manor Farm | 34 | 11 | 6 | 17 | 55 | 69 | −14 | 39 | |
| 13 | Westbury United | 34 | 9 | 9 | 16 | 39 | 53 | −14 | 36 | |
| 14 | Barnstaple Town | 34 | 10 | 6 | 18 | 61 | 78 | −17 | 36 | |
| 15 | Odd Down Athletic | 34 | 6 | 6 | 22 | 39 | 77 | −38 | 24 | |
| 16 | Elmore | 34 | 6 | 6 | 22 | 30 | 91 | −61 | 24 | |
| 17 | Frome Town (R) | 34 | 5 | 7 | 22 | 30 | 84 | −54 | 22 | Relegated to the First Division |
| 18 | Crediton United (R) | 34 | 3 | 6 | 25 | 18 | 96 | −78 | 15 | Relegated to the First Division |

(C) Champions; (R) Relegated

=== First Division ===
The First Division was reduced from 21 clubs to 19, after Backwell United and Brislington were promoted to the Premier Division. No clubs joined.

| Pos | Team | Pld | W | D | L | GF | GA | GD | Pts | Promotion |
|---|---|---|---|---|---|---|---|---|---|---|
| 1 | Bridgwater Town (C, P) | 36 | 29 | 3 | 4 | 93 | 29 | +64 | 90 | Promoted to the Premier Division |
| 2 | Chard Town (P) | 36 | 28 | 6 | 2 | 65 | 17 | +48 | 90 | Promoted to the Premier Division |
| 3 | Keynsham Town | 36 | 22 | 7 | 7 | 69 | 35 | +34 | 73 | |
| 4 | Bishop Sutton | 36 | 18 | 9 | 9 | 48 | 36 | +12 | 63 | |
| 5 | Clyst Rovers | 36 | 18 | 7 | 11 | 74 | 52 | +22 | 61 | |
| 6 | Welton Rovers | 36 | 15 | 11 | 10 | 52 | 43 | +9 | 56 | |
| 7 | Devizes Town | 36 | 15 | 10 | 11 | 61 | 50 | +11 | 55 | |
| 8 | Dawlish Town | 36 | 14 | 9 | 13 | 56 | 53 | +3 | 51 | |
| 9 | Melksham Town | 36 | 13 | 11 | 12 | 59 | 54 | +5 | 50 | |
| 10 | Warminster Town | 36 | 14 | 6 | 16 | 51 | 57 | −6 | 48 | |
| 11 | Glastonbury | 36 | 12 | 10 | 14 | 45 | 54 | −9 | 46 | |
| 12 | Wellington | 36 | 12 | 8 | 16 | 47 | 52 | −5 | 44 | |
| 13 | Pewsey Vale | 36 | 10 | 6 | 20 | 34 | 71 | −37 | 36 | |
| 14 | Heavitree United | 36 | 9 | 8 | 19 | 64 | 81 | −17 | 35 | |
| 15 | Larkhall Athletic | 36 | 10 | 4 | 22 | 50 | 78 | −28 | 34 | |
| 16 | Amesbury Town | 36 | 7 | 10 | 19 | 37 | 67 | −30 | 31 | |
| 17 | Minehead | 36 | 8 | 7 | 21 | 41 | 73 | −32 | 31 | |
| 18 | Exmouth Town | 36 | 9 | 3 | 24 | 44 | 67 | −23 | 30 | |
| 19 | Ilfracombe Town | 36 | 6 | 11 | 19 | 43 | 64 | −21 | 29 | |

Rules for classification: The system of using goal difference to separate two teams tied on points was used. The points system: 3 points for a win, 1 point for a draw and 0 points for losing.
(C) Champions; (P) Promoted
