= 1983–84 Western Football League =

Western Football League
- Season: 1983–84
- Champions: Exmouth Town (Premier Division); Bristol City Reserves (Division One)

The 1983–84 season was the 82nd in the history of the Western Football League.

The league champions for the first time in their history were Exmouth Town. The champions of Division One were Bristol City Reserves.

== Final tables ==
=== Premier Division ===
The Premier Division remained at twenty clubs after Falmouth Town and Bridport left the league, and Keynsham Town and Portway Bristol were relegated to the First Division. Four clubs joined:

- Bristol Manor Farm, champions of the First Division.
- Mangotsfield United, runners-up in the First Division.
- Minehead, from the Southern League – returning to the league after leaving in 1972.
- Taunton Town, from the Southern League – returning to the league after leaving in 1977.

Pos	Team	Pld	W	D	L	GF	GA	GD	Pts	Relegation
1	Exmouth Town	38	21	11	6	59	35	+24	53	
2	Saltash United	38	22	7	9	72	39	+33	51	
3	Barnstaple Town	38	21	9	8	68	40	+28	51	
4	Frome Town	38	20	10	8	78	35	+43	50	
5	Liskeard Athletic	38	18	9	11	64	38	+26	45	
6	Bideford	38	16	10	12	71	49	+22	42	
7	Clevedon Town	38	16	8	14	55	56	−1	40	
8	Bristol Manor Farm	38	14	11	13	54	42	+12	39	
9	Plymouth Argyle Reserves	38	16	8	14	68	58	+10	38 (Note: Plymouth Argyle Reserves had two points deducted for fielding ineligible players.)	
10	Minehead	38	15	7	16	55	68	−13	37	
11	Shepton Mallet Town	38	14	9	15	55	74	−19	37	
12	Taunton Town	38	10	15	13	46	52	−6	35	
13	Mangotsfield United	38	12	10	16	47	48	−1	34	
14	Dawlish Town	38	13	8	17	38	43	−5	34	
15	Weston-super-Mare	38	13	8	17	46	54	−8	34	
16	Chippenham Town	38	13	8	17	44	56	−12	34	
17	Clandown	38	12	10	16	34	51	−17	34	
18	Melksham Town	38	9	11	18	49	66	−17	29	
19	Devizes Town	38	7	11	20	41	74	−33	25	
20	Wellington (R)	38	4	8	26	29	95	−66	16	Relegated to Division One

(R) Relegated

=== First Division ===
The First Division consisted of 21 clubs, increased from 19 the previous season, after Bristol Manor Farm and Mangotsfield United were promoted to the Premier Division. Four new clubs joined:

- Backwell United, from the Somerset County League.
- Keynsham Town, relegated from the Premier Division.
- Portway Bristol, relegated from the Premier Division.
- Warminster Town, from the Wiltshire League – returning to the league after leaving in 1939.

Pos	Team	Pld	W	D	L	GF	GA	GD	Pts	Promotion
1	Bristol City Reserves (P)	40	26	8	6	96	36	+60	60	Promoted to the Premier Division
2	Chard Town (P)	40	22	8	10	82	44	+38	52	Promoted to the Premier Division
3	Paulton Rovers (P)	40	20	12	8	74	46	+28	52	Promoted to the Premier Division
4	Swanage Town & Herston	40	19	12	9	89	61	+28	50	
5	Keynsham Town	40	19	11	10	50	36	+14	49	
6	Backwell United	40	18	13	9	47	42	+5	49	
7	Glastonbury	40	15	9	16	68	61	+7	39	
8	Welton Rovers	40	13	13	14	49	56	−7	39	
9	Portway Bristol	40	13	12	15	57	49	+8	38	
10	Wimborne Town	40	14	10	16	51	60	−9	38	
11	Bath City Reserves	40	13	11	16	61	57	+4	37	
12	Warminster Town	40	15	7	18	61	67	−6	37	
13	Odd Down	40	12	13	15	60	66	−6	37	
14	Larkhall Athletic	40	12	12	16	50	55	−5	36	
15	Radstock Town	40	13	10	17	51	63	−12	36	
16	Heavitree United	40	14	8	18	66	80	−14	36	
17	Yeovil Town Reserves	40	11	13	16	65	72	−7	35	
18	Ottery St Mary	40	14	7	19	42	58	−16	35	
19	Elmore	40	11	12	17	47	78	−31	34	
20	Weymouth Reserves	40	12	7	21	43	64	−21	31	
21	Tiverton Town	40	5	10	25	37	95	−58	20	

Rules for classification: The system of using goal difference to separate two teams tied on points was used. The points system: 2 points for a win, 1 point for a draw and 0 points for losing.
(P) Promoted
