= 1996–97 Western Football League =

Western Football League season

Western Football League
- Season: 1996–97
- Champions: Tiverton Town (Premier Division); Melksham Town (Division One)

The 1996–97 season was the 95th in the history of the Western Football League.

The league champions for the third time in their history (and the third time in four seasons) were Tiverton Town. The champions of Division One were Melksham Town.

== Final tables ==
=== Premier Division ===
The Premier Division remained at 18 clubs after Crediton United and Frome Town were relegated to the First Division. Two clubs joined:

- Bridgwater Town, champions of the First Division.
- Chard Town, runners-up in the First Division.
- Odd Down Athletic F.C. reverted to their former name of Odd Down F.C.

Pos	Team	Pld	W	D	L	GF	GA	GD	Pts
1	Tiverton Town (C)	34	31	1	2	103	20	+83	94
2	Taunton Town	34	24	6	4	99	28	+71	78
3	Mangotsfield United	34	19	8	7	75	44	+31	65
4	Paulton Rovers	34	17	10	7	86	42	+44	61
5	Chippenham Town	34	12	12	10	58	52	+6	48
6	Brislington	34	12	9	13	53	48	+5	45
7	Calne Town	34	13	6	15	55	52	+3	45
8	Torrington	34	11	11	12	54	54	0	44
9	Bridgwater Town	34	12	8	14	53	55	−2	44
10	Bridport	34	11	10	13	41	50	−9	43
11	Odd Down	34	11	15	8	42	46	−4	39 (Note: Odd Down had nine points deducted for fielding ineligible players.)
12	Bideford	34	11	6	17	51	84	−33	39
13	Barnstaple Town	34	10	8	16	54	62	−8	38
14	Bristol Manor Farm	34	9	10	15	40	60	−20	37
15	Backwell United	34	9	9	16	42	55	−13	36
16	Chard Town	34	9	7	18	45	67	−22	34
17	Westbury United	34	8	6	20	40	70	−30	30
18	Elmore	34	4	4	26	30	132	−102	16

(C) Champions

=== First Division ===
The First Division was increased from 19 clubs to 20, after Bridgwater Town and Chard Town were promoted to the Premier Division. Three clubs joined:

- Crediton United, relegated from the Premier Division.
- Frome Town, relegated from the Premier Division.
- Yeovil Town Reserves, rejoining the league after leaving in 1991.

Pos	Team	Pld	W	D	L	GF	GA	GD	Pts	Promotion
1	Melksham Town (C, P)	38	27	8	3	82	20	+62	89	Promoted to the Premier Division
2	Keynsham Town (P)	38	27	7	4	77	21	+56	88	Promoted to the Premier Division
3	Exmouth Town	38	23	7	8	77	42	+35	76	
4	Clyst Rovers	38	23	6	9	92	48	+44	75	
5	Bishop Sutton	38	21	7	10	96	52	+44	70	
6	Wellington	38	21	5	12	82	62	+20	68	
7	Devizes Town	38	18	11	9	75	39	+36	65	
8	Dawlish Town	38	18	9	11	66	36	+30	63	
9	Ilfracombe Town	38	15	12	11	62	44	+18	57	
10	Welton Rovers	38	15	7	16	68	59	+9	52	
11	Minehead	38	16	4	18	61	56	+5	52	
12	Frome Town	38	12	11	15	45	60	−15	47	
13	Yeovil Town Reserves	38	12	8	18	66	77	−11	44	
14	Glastonbury	38	12	7	19	54	72	−18	43	
15	Crediton United	38	12	4	22	58	91	−33	40	
16	Warminster Town	38	9	8	21	44	75	−31	35	
17	Larkhall Athletic	38	7	13	18	51	92	−41	34	
18	Heavitree United	38	7	11	20	44	95	−51	32	
19	Pewsey Vale	38	5	4	29	26	105	−79	19	
20	Amesbury Town	38	1	9	28	27	107	−80	12	Left at the end of the season

Rules for classification: The system of using goal difference to separate two teams tied on points was used. The points system: 3 points for a win, 1 point for a draw and 0 points for losing.
(C) Champions; (P) Promoted
