= 1976–77 Western Football League =

Western Football League
- Season: 1976–77
- Champions: Falmouth Town (Premier Division); Saltash United (Division One)

The 1976–77 season was the 75th in the history of the Western Football League. The league was split into two divisions for the first time since 1959–60.

The league champions for the third time in their history, and the third season in succession, were Falmouth Town. The champions of the new Division One were newcomers Saltash United.

This season was the last in which goal average decided places for teams which were level on points.

== Final tables ==
=== Premier Division ===
The new Premier Division was created from the top eighteen clubs in the old single division of the previous season.

Pos	Team	Pld	W	D	L	GF	GA	GR	Pts	Relegation
1	Falmouth Town	34	26	2	6	69	24	2.875	80	
2	Weston-super-Mare	34	18	12	4	57	31	1.839	66	
3	Clevedon	34	18	10	6	58	31	1.871	64	
4	Bridgwater Town	34	17	10	7	51	36	1.417	61	
5	Barnstaple Town	34	16	9	9	64	48	1.333	57	
6	Bideford	34	15	11	8	70	38	1.842	56	
7	Bridport	34	16	8	10	53	35	1.514	56	
8	Paulton Rovers	34	13	10	11	52	46	1.130	49	
9	Taunton Town	34	14	6	14	49	46	1.065	48	Joined the Southern League
10	Dawlish	34	11	10	13	36	41	0.878	43	
11	Glastonbury	34	11	8	15	56	58	0.966	41	
12	Frome Town	34	10	11	13	45	52	0.865	41	
13	Tiverton Town	34	11	7	16	35	61	0.574	40	
14	Welton Rovers	34	9	9	16	35	46	0.761	36	
15	Mangotsfield United	34	10	4	20	36	66	0.545	34	
16	St Luke's College	34	7	6	21	32	61	0.525	27	
17	Exeter City Reserves	34	7	3	24	36	76	0.474	23 (Note: Exeter City Reserves had one point deducted for fielding an ineligible player.)	
18	Westland-Yeovil (R)	34	4	10	20	31	69	0.449	22	Relegated to Division One

(R) Relegated

=== First Division ===
The new First Division consisted of the bottom five clubs from the previous season, plus thirteen new clubs:

- Brixham United, from the Plymouth & District League.
- Chard Town, from the Somerset Senior League.
- Clandown, rejoining after leaving in 1960.
- Heavitree United
- Ilminster Town
- Larkhall Athletic
- Ottery St Mary, from the South Western League.
- Portway Bristol
- Saltash United, from the South Western League.
- Shepton Mallet Town, from the Somerset Senior League.
- Swanage Town & Herston
- Torquay United Reserves, rejoining after leaving in 1973.
- Yeovil Town Reserves, rejoining after leaving in 1970.

Pos	Team	Pld	W	D	L	GF	GA	GR	Pts	Promotion
1	Saltash United (P)	34	24	6	4	81	29	2.793	78	Promoted to the Premier Division
2	Shepton Mallet Town (P)	34	23	7	4	84	39	2.154	76	Promoted to the Premier Division
3	Keynsham Town	34	23	2	9	87	38	2.289	71	
4	Melksham Town	34	20	7	7	69	36	1.917	67	
5	Chippenham Town	34	17	6	11	53	43	1.233	57	
6	Devizes Town	34	15	8	11	58	44	1.318	52 (Note: Devizes Town had one point deducted for fielding an ineligible player.)	
7	Torquay United Reserves	34	15	3	16	61	59	1.034	48	
8	Portway Bristol	34	13	9	12	57	58	0.983	48	
9	Larkhall Athletic	34	13	7	14	59	69	0.855	46	
10	Clandown	34	10	12	12	54	58	0.931	42	
11	Yeovil Town Reserves	34	11	7	16	52	55	0.945	40	
12	Brixham United	34	9	8	17	45	77	0.584	35	
13	Ottery St Mary	34	8	10	16	41	61	0.672	34	
14	Exmouth Town	34	9	7	18	40	68	0.588	34	
15	Chard Town	34	8	9	17	43	63	0.683	33	
16	Swanage Town & Herston	34	8	9	17	48	72	0.667	33	
17	Ilminster Town	34	8	9	17	39	69	0.565	33	
18	Heavitree United	34	4	10	20	23	56	0.411	22	

Rules for classification: The system of using goal average to separate two teams tied on points was used up to and including the 1976–77 season. The points system: 3 points for a win, 1 point for a draw and 0 points for losing.
(P) Promoted
