= 1974–75 Western Football League =

73rd season of the Western Football League

Western Football League
- Season: 1974–75
- Champions: Falmouth Town

The 1974–75 season was the 73rd in the history of the Western Football League.

The champions for the first time in their history were newcomers Falmouth Town. Falmouth were the first Cornish club to play in the Western League, and they won the league at their first attempt, remaining unbeaten throughout the season.

This was the first season in which three points were awarded for a win, rather than the traditional two points.

== League table ==
The league was increased from 19 clubs to 21 after Avon Bradford and Exeter City Reserves left, and four new clubs joined:

- Falmouth Town
- Melksham Town
- Paulton Rovers, rejoining the league after leaving in 1960.
- Westland-Yeovil
- Ashtonians United merged with Clevedon and retained their place in the league under the Clevedon name.

Pos	Team	Pld	W	D	L	GF	GA	GR	Pts
1	Falmouth Town	40	31	9	0	122	26	4.692	102
2	Taunton Town	40	30	9	1	136	24	5.667	99
3	Bridgwater Town	40	27	8	5	92	38	2.421	89
4	Mangotsfield United	40	24	6	10	88	44	2.000	78
5	Barnstaple Town	40	17	11	12	79	66	1.197	62
6	Frome Town	40	17	10	13	65	59	1.102	61
7	Glastonbury	40	17	10	13	62	57	1.088	61
8	Westland-Yeovil	40	17	7	16	66	60	1.100	58
9	Welton Rovers	40	15	11	14	63	59	1.068	56
10	Dawlish	40	16	7	17	69	72	0.958	55
11	Keynsham Town	40	15	10	15	63	67	0.940	55
12	Paulton Rovers	40	13	11	16	63	59	1.068	50
13	Devizes Town	40	11	11	18	39	59	0.661	44
14	Weston-super-Mare	40	11	10	19	39	52	0.750	43
15	Chippenham Town	40	10	12	18	55	85	0.647	42
16	St Luke's College	40	11	7	22	44	83	0.530	40
17	Tiverton Town	40	9	12	19	45	79	0.570	39
18	Bridport	40	9	7	24	51	110	0.464	34
19	Melksham Town	40	7	12	21	39	82	0.476	33
20	Clevedon	40	8	8	24	52	94	0.553	32
21	Exmouth Town	40	8	6	26	39	96	0.406	30

Rules for classification: The system of using goal average to separate two teams tied on points was used up to and including the 1976–77 season. The points system: 3 points for a win, 1 point for a draw and 0 points for losing.
