= 1973–74 Western Football League =

Western Football League
- Season: 1973–74
- Champions: Welton Rovers

The 1973–74 season was the 72nd in the history of the Western Football League.

The champions for the fourth time in their history were Welton Rovers.

== League table ==
The league was increased from sixteen clubs to nineteen after Bristol City Colts and Torquay United Reserves left, and five new clubs joined:

- Chippenham Town, rejoining the league after leaving in 1965.
- Dawlish
- Exmouth Town
- Keynsham Town
- Tiverton Town

Pos	Team	Pld	W	D	L	GF	GA	GR	Pts	Qualification
1	Welton Rovers	36	27	5	4	80	32	2.500	59	
2	Taunton Town	36	25	8	3	86	19	4.526	58	
3	Bridgwater Town	36	23	6	7	71	34	2.088	52	
4	Exeter City Reserves	36	21	7	8	61	33	1.848	49	Left at the end of the season
5	Devizes Town	36	18	9	9	73	44	1.659	45	
6	Glastonbury	36	18	7	11	69	46	1.500	43	
7	Frome Town	36	16	9	11	64	43	1.488	41	
8	Barnstaple Town	36	17	7	12	76	60	1.267	41	
9	Mangotsfield United	36	17	7	12	57	52	1.096	41	
10	Dawlish	36	17	6	13	53	67	0.791	40	
11	St Luke's College	36	14	5	17	48	48	1.000	33	
12	Weston-super-Mare	36	13	7	16	44	50	0.880	33	
13	Keynsham Town	36	11	5	20	39	65	0.600	27	
14	Tiverton Town	36	7	11	18	42	67	0.627	25	
15	Bridport	36	10	5	21	41	67	0.612	25	
16	Exmouth Town	36	6	11	19	31	70	0.443	23	
17	Ashtonians United	36	8	5	23	43	75	0.573	21	Merged with Clevedon at the end of the season
18	Avon Bradford	36	5	6	25	36	85	0.424	16	Left at the end of the season
19	Chippenham Town	36	3	6	27	25	82	0.305	12	

Rules for classification: The system of using goal average to separate two teams tied on points was used up to and including the 1976–77 season. The points system: 2 points for a win, 1 point for a draw and 0 points for losing.
