= 1975–76 Western Football League =

Western Football League
- Season: 1975–76
- Champions: Falmouth Town

The 1975–76 season was the 74th in the history of the Western Football League.

The champions for the second time in their history, and the second season in succession, were Falmouth Town.

This season was the last in which the league consisted of one single division – a second tier was added for 1976–77.

== League table ==
The league was increased from 21 clubs to 23 after two new clubs joined:

- Bideford, rejoining from the Southern League having last played in the Western League in 1972.
- Exeter City Reserves, rejoining after leaving in 1974.

Pos	Team	Pld	W	D	L	GF	GA	GR	Pts	Relegation
1	Falmouth Town	44	35	5	4	134	43	3.116	110	
2	Taunton Town	44	27	8	9	86	43	2.000	89	
3	Clevedon	44	27	6	11	77	51	1.510	87	
4	Bridgwater Town	44	25	10	9	81	44	1.841	85	
5	Glastonbury	44	23	10	11	84	49	1.714	79	
6	Barnstaple Town	44	21	9	14	95	66	1.439	72	
7	Tiverton Town	44	20	12	12	73	70	1.043	72	
8	Paulton Rovers	44	19	12	13	60	58	1.034	69	
9	Mangotsfield United	44	18	10	16	63	63	1.000	64	
10	Bideford	44	17	12	15	60	56	1.071	63	
11	Frome Town	44	17	10	17	76	61	1.246	61	
12	Exeter City Reserves	44	16	10	18	64	69	0.928	57 (Note: Exeter City Reserves had one point deducted for fielding an ineligible player.)	
13	St Luke's College	44	16	7	21	60	70	0.857	55	
14	Weston-super-Mare	44	13	15	16	52	57	0.912	54	
15	Westland-Yeovil	44	14	11	19	66	82	0.805	53	
16	Welton Rovers	44	14	9	21	57	71	0.803	51	
17	Bridport	44	13	11	20	49	72	0.681	50	
18	Dawlish	44	13	10	21	51	69	0.739	49	
19	Devizes Town (R)	44	10	15	19	45	59	0.763	45	Relegated to Division One
20	Chippenham Town (R)	44	12	7	25	66	94	0.702	43	Relegated to Division One
21	Melksham Town (R)	44	12	7	25	66	106	0.623	43	Relegated to Division One
22	Keynsham Town (R)	44	8	6	30	50	86	0.581	30	Relegated to Division One
23	Exmouth Town (R)	44	5	10	29	38	114	0.333	25	Relegated to Division One

Rules for classification: The system of using goal average to separate two teams tied on points was used up to and including the 1976–77 season. The points system: 3 points for a win, 1 point for a draw and 0 points for losing.
(R) Relegated
