= Paul Hirons =

English footballer (born 1971)

Personal information
- Full name: Paul Terence Hirons
- Date of birth: 6 March 1971 (age 55)
- Place of birth: Bath, England
- Position: Winger

Team information
- Current team: Wickwar Wanderers Reserves (manager)

Youth career
- –1989: Bristol City

Senior career*
Years	Team	Apps	(Gls)
1989–1990	Torquay United	21	(0)
- Bath City
- Yeovil Town
- Westbury United
- Cheltenham Town
- Clevedon Town
- Yate Town
–1996	Forest Green Rovers		
- Taunton Town
- Trowbridge Town
1998–2001	Keynsham Town		
- Paulton Rovers

Managerial career
- 1998–2001: Keynsham Town
- 2001–2003: Paulton Rovers
- 2025–: Wickwar Wanderers Reserves
- * Club domestic league appearances and goals

Paul Terence Hirons (born 6 March 1971) is an English former football player and manager who played as a winger.

== Playing career ==
Hirons began his career in the academy at Bristol City, before signing for Torquay United in January 1989. On 6 January 1990, Hirons scored his first Torquay goal, scoring the only goal in a 1–0 FA Cup upset against West Ham United. In total, Hirons made 21 Football League appearances for Torquay.

In 1990, following his release from Torquay, Hirons dropped down to non-league, signing for hometown club Bath City. Hirons later played for Yeovil Town, Westbury United, Cheltenham Town, Clevedon Town, Yate Town, Forest Green Rovers, Taunton Town and Trowbridge Town.

== Coaching career ==
Whilst still playing, Hirons was appointed manager of Keynsham Town in 1998. In 2001, after guiding Keynsham to promotion from the Western League Division One, Hirons was appointed manager of Paulton Rovers.

Following his managerial career, Hirons moved into coaching, as well as taking up a scouting role at Bristol City.
