= ETFC =

The acronym ETFC may refer to:

- Eastwood Town F.C.
- Edgware Town F.C.
- Egham Town F.C.
- Enfield Town F.C.
- Erith Town F.C.
- Exmouth Town F.C.
- E-Trade Financial Corporation
