= Bristol Manor Farm F.C. =

Association football club in England

Coordinates: 51°28′54″N 2°39′02″W

Bristol Manor Farm
- Full name: Bristol Manor Farm Football Club
- Nicknames: The Farm, Farmy Army, The Portwaymen
- Founded: 1960
- Ground: The Creek, Bristol
- Capacity: 1,700 (200 seated)
- Chairman: John Line
- Manager: Vacant
- League: Southern League Division One South
- 2025–26: Southern League Division One South, 15th of 22
Home colours	Away colours

Bristol Manor Farm Football Club is an English football club based in Bristol, England. They are currently members of the Southern League Division One South and play at The Creek. The club is affiliated to the Gloucestershire County FA.

== History ==
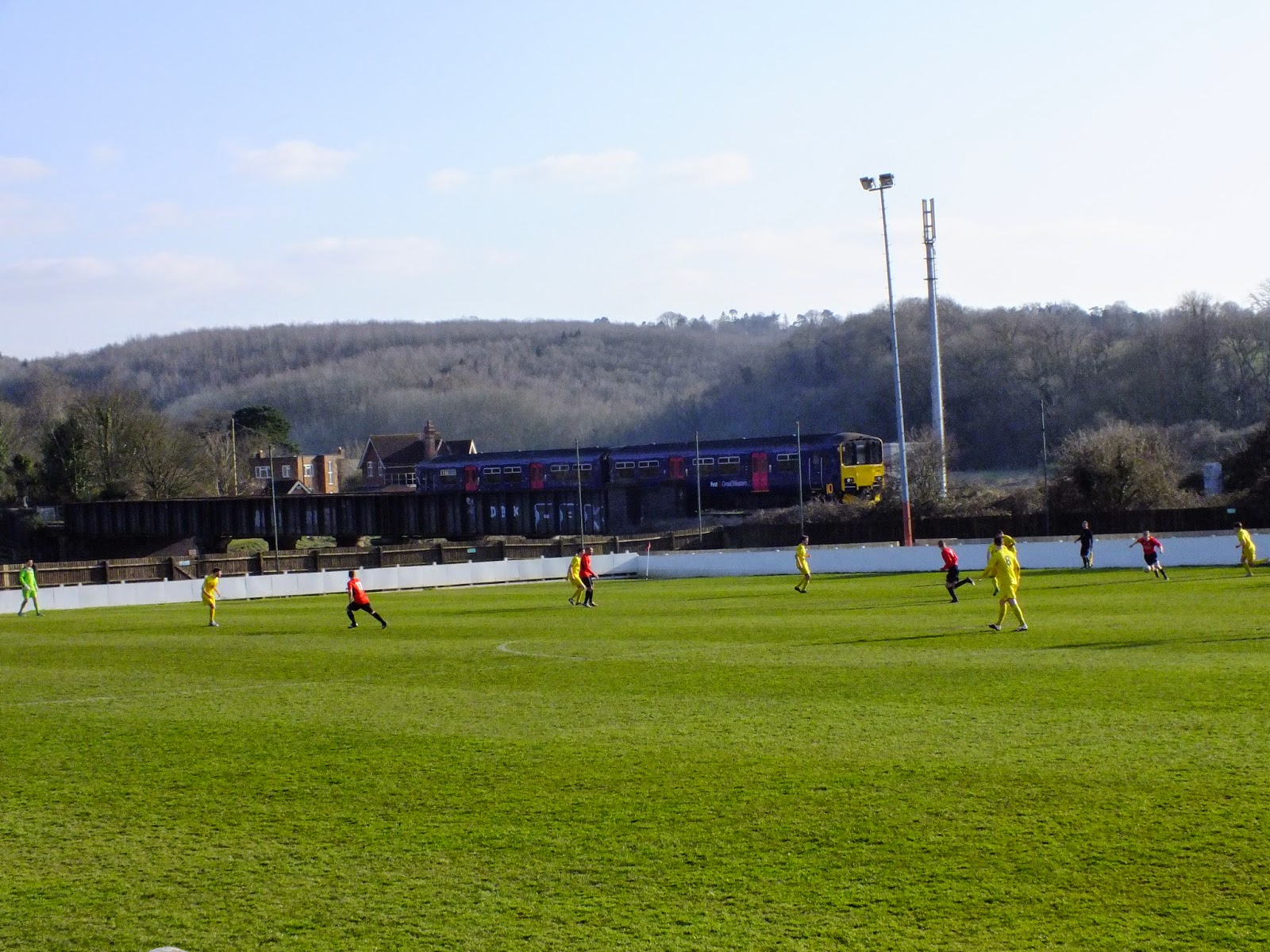
Bristol Manor Farm's ground, The BS3 Services Stadium, in 2015

Bristol Manor Farm Football Club was formed for the 1960–61 season. After just one season, the club was disbanded but was reformed and began playing again in the 1962–63 season. Their current home, The NL Services Stadium, used to be the site of the Port of Bristol Authority Sports & Social Club but when they moved to new premises 1965, Manor Farm took it over. The pitch at The NL Services Stadium was once notorious for its sloping surface but work has been undertaken in recent years to eliminate the slope. With seating and floodlights added in 1980, the club now boasts excellent facilities alongside a spacious clubhouse.

Having a permanent base enabled the club to apply successfully to join the Somerset Senior League, where they were to progress rapidly through the divisions before deciding to advance further to the Western League in 1977.

The club joined the First Division for the 1977–78 season and remained there until the 1982–83 season when they won the First Division championship and gained promotion to the Premier Division. They remained there until relegation under Pete McCall's management team in 2001–02, but regained their Premier status just two seasons later in 2003/04 under Shaun Bond and Nicky Johns. In 1983–84, they reached the final of the G.F.A. Challenge Trophy where they lost to then Hellenic League side Shortwood United. The trophy did make its way to the Creek in 1987–88 and has been won on a further three occasions by the club.

=== Main stand at The Creek ===
The 2011–12 season saw the club win its first double when they took both the GFA Challenge Trophy and the Toolstation League Les Phillips League Cup back to Sea Mills.

Lee Lashenko become the new manager at the start of the 2013–14 season and quickly made an impact in the FA Cup, overcoming Oldland Abbotonians, Lymington Town and Corsham Town to reach the second qualifying round, equaling their best ever performance in the competition. Unfortunately, they were unable to go one better and lost to Bridgwater Town 1–2 in a replay at Fairfax Park. The club continued to fight for top spot in the league and applied for promotion. The club finished second but were unsuccessful in their promotion bid when Larkhall Athletic were accepted into the Southern League. The second-placed finish was the best in the club's history. It also saw the team break the club records for the most goals scored in a season and the fewest goals conceded.

The 2015–16 season left the club with mixed feelings as on one hand they managed to get to the Quarter-Final of the FA Vase narrowly going out away to eventual winners Morpeth Town. On the other hand, while they finished third in the Western League, again they just missed out on promotion to the Southern League by one place. They did, however, win the GFA County Challenge Trophy for the second time in succession and the fourth time overall with a record 9–2 win over Lydney Town.

In the 2016–17 season, Bristol Manor Farm were finally successful in gaining promotion to the Southern League, winning the Western League by quite a distance. They also had another successful run in the FA Vase where they went out in the fifth round proper to Semi-Finalists Bromsgrove Sporting.

The Farm finished their first season in the eighth tier in ninth place, falling away towards the end after troubling the top six places all season.

In recent years, the ‘University of Bristol Manor Farm Supporters Club’ has been formed, an official supporters group affiliated with both the football club and the University of Bristol.

== Staff ==
- First Team Manager: Will Justin
- Assistant Manager: Marc Ford
- Physio: Nigel White
- Coach(s): John Toy, Catalin Andrei
- Media Manager: Alex Barnham
- Photographer: Alex Barnham

== Club rivals ==
Bristol Manor Farm's main rivals are considered to be Yate Town, Mangotsfield United and Cribbs, all from the northern outskirts of Bristol. With all four clubs playing in the Southern Football Leagues, fixtures among the four have been seen by some fans as a contest to claim the title of Bristol's third club and tend to attract higher than usual attendances.

== Honours ==
- Western Football League Premier Division
  - Champions: 2016–17
  - Runners-up: 2013–14
- Western Football League Division One
  - Champions: 1982–83

== Cup honours ==
- Gloucestershire Football Association Challenge Trophy
  - Winners: 1987–88, 2011–12, 2014–15, 2015-16
- Western Football League Cup:
  - Winners: 2011–12
- Gloucestershire Football Association Senior Challenge Cup:
  - Winners: 2024-25

== Seasons ==
Season	Division	Pos	P	W	D	L	F	A	GD	Pts	FA Cup	FA Trophy	FA Vase
1977–78	Western Football League Division 1	4th	36	20	5	11	67	38	+29	65	–	–	–
1978–79	Western Football League Division 1	3rd	36	20	5	11	59	47	+12	65	–	–	PR
1979–80	Western Football League Division 1	8th	42	20	9	13	70	58	+12	49	–	–	R1
1980–81	Western Football League Division 1	10th	36	14	8	14	53	57	–4	36	–	–	R1
1981–82	Western Football League Division 1	8th	36	15	9	12	58	50	+8	39	–	–	R1
1982–83	Western Football League Division 1	1st	36	26	7	3	85	31	+54	59	QR2	–	R3
1983–84	Western Football League Premier Division	8th	38	14	11	13	54	42	+12	39	PR	–	R5
1984–85	Western Football League Premier Division	6th	42	21	7	14	70	55	+15	49	PR	–	R4
1985–86	Western Football League Premier Division	11th	42	16	9	17	71	72	–1	41	QR1	PR	–
1986–87	Western Football League Premier Division	5th	42	19	10	13	58	46	+12	48	PR	–	R1
1987–88	Western Football League Premier Division	8th	42	17	14	11	66	52	+14	47 (-1)	QR1	–	R1
1988–89	Western Football League Premier Division	6th	40	20	7	13	72	49	+23	47	PR	–	PR
1989–90	Western Football League Premier Division	12th	40	13	12	15	49	59	–10	51	QR1	–	R2
1990–91	Western Football League Premier Division	14th	40	12	9	19	52	66	–14	45	QR1	–	PR
1991–92	Western Football League Premier Division	16th	40	10	10	20	42	66	–24	40	PR	–	R1
1992–93	Western Football League Premier Division	13th	38	10	13	15	49	59	–10	43	QR1	–	R1
1993–94	Western Football League Premier Division	13th	34	11	3	20	51	77	–26	36	PR	–	PR
1994–95	Western Football League Premier Division	9th	34	14	6	14	51	48	+3	48	–	–	EPR
1995–96	Western Football League Premier Division	12th	34	11	6	17	55	69	–14	39	QR1	–	QR2
1996–97	Western Football League Premier Division	14th	34	9	10	15	40	60	–20	37	QR1	–	QR1
1997–98	Western Football League Premier Division	16th	38	8	10	20	37	73	–36	34	–	–	–
1998–99	Western Football League Premier Division	13th	38	15	4	19	61	57	+4	49	–	–	–
1999–00	Western Football League Premier Division	17th	36	8	9	19	48	78	–30	33	–	–	–
2000–01	Western Football League Premier Division	18th	38	8	8	22	37	66	–29	32	QR1	–	QR2
2001–02	Western Football League Premier Division	19th	38	7	8	23	30	80	–50	29	QR1	–	QR1
2002–03	Western Football League Division 1	11th	36	14	4	18	56	71	–15	46	PR	–	QR1
2003–04	Western Football League Division 1	3rd	36	20	14	2	74	38	+36	74	PR	–	QR1
2004–05	Western Football League Premier Division	7th	38	17	7	14	56	59	–3	58	EPR	–	QR2
2005–06	Western Football League Premier Division	3rd	38	24	4	10	86	43	+43	76	PR	–	R1
2006–07	Western Football League Premier Division	12th	42	14	12	16	50	51	–1	54	EPR	–	R2
2007–08	Western Football League Premier Division	16th	40	10	9	21	64	84	–20	39	EPR	–	QR1
2008–09	Western Football League Premier Division	5th	40	22	6	12	75	53	+22	72	EPR	–	QR1
2009–10	Western Football League Premier Division	7th	38	16	11	11	70	55	+15	59	QR1	–	R4
2010–11	Western Football League Premier Division	7th	36	18	7	11	73	63	+10	61	QR2	–	R2
2011–12	Western Football League Premier Division	8th	34	13	8	13	63	57	+6	47	EPR	–	QR2
2012–13	Western Football League Premier Division	18th	38	11	6	21	55	72	–17	39	EPR	–	QR2
2013–14	Western Football League Premier Division	2nd	40	26	8	6	104	32	+72	86	QR2	–	R1
2014–15	Western Football League Premier Division	4th	36	18	9	9	67	40	+27	63	PR	–	R2
2015–16	Western Football League Premier Division	3rd	38	25	5	8	109	44	+65	80	QR1	–	QF
2016–17	Western Football League Premier Division	1st	38	33	3	2	118	33	+85	102	EPR	–	R5
2017–18	Southern Football League West Division	9th	42	20	9	13	83	61	+22	69	PR	QR1	–
2018–19	Southern Football League Division One South	15th	38	13	7	18	65	77	–12	46	QR3	QR1	–
2019–20	Southern Football League Division One South	15th*	27	8	6	13	31	44	–13	30	QR3	PR	–
2020–21	Southern Football League Division One South	11th*	7	3	1	3	12	14	–2	10	QR3	QR2	–
2021–22	Southern Football League Division One South	5th	36	20	9	7	64	41	+23	69	PR	QR2	–
2022–23	Southern Football League Division One South	18th	38	11	9	18	56	76	–20	42	PR	R1	–
2023–24	Southern Football League Division One South	4th	36	17	8	11	67	50	+17	59	QR2	QR2	–
2024–25	Southern Football League Division One South	12th	42	13	16	13	73	70	+3	55	PR	R1	–
2025–26	Southern Football League Division One South	15th	42	12	12	18	57	77	–20	48	EPR	QR1	–

- Season abandoned due to COVID-19 Pandemic*

== Records ==
- FA Cup
  - Third qualifying round 2018–19, 2019–20, 2020–21
- FA Trophy
  - First round proper 2022–23, 2024–25
- FA Vase
  - Quarter Finals 2015–16
- Biggest victory
  - 10–0 versus Devizes Town in the Les Phillips Cup. Saturday 19 November 2016.
- Biggest Defeat
  - 0-11 versus Bristol City in the annual Community Match at The Creek on Sunday 9 July 2017.
- Record Attendance
  - 1417 versus Bristol City in a pre-season friendly. Sunday 9 July 2017

== Notable past players ==
- Alan Crawford
- Danny Maye
- David Mehew
