= Dick Ebdon =

English footballer

Personal information
- Full name: Richard George Ebdon
- Date of birth: 3 May 1913
- Place of birth: Ottery St Mary, England
- Date of death: 27 April 1987 (aged 73)
- Place of death: Fairmile, Ottery St Mary, England
- Height: 5 ft 8 in (1.73 m)
- Position: Forward

Senior career*
Years	Team	Apps	(Gls)
- Ottery St Mary
1935–1948	Exeter City	139	(52)
1948	Torquay United	5	(1)
- * Club domestic league appearances and goals

Richard George Ebdon (3 May 1913 – 27 April 1987) was an English professional football forward. He was born and died in Ottery St Mary, Devon.

Dick "Digger" Ebdon joined Exeter City from local side Ottery St Mary in December 1935 and went on to score 52 goals in 139 league games (Note: figures include matches in the abandoned 1939–40 season) for the Grecians in a career interrupted by war. In July 1948 he moved to Torquay United and scored on his debut in a 3–1 win at home to Notts County. However, with competition from Jack Conley and Ron Shaw played only four further games before leaving league football.

Ebdon died in April 1987 aged 73.
