= Arthur Buxton (footballer) =

English footballer

Personal information
- Full name: Arthur Buxton
- Date of birth: 15 May 1908
- Place of birth: Barlborough, Derbyshire, England
- Position: Left-back

Senior career*
Years	Team	Apps	(Gls)
- Worksop Town
1930–1931	Wrexham	15	(0)
- Bangor City
- Wellington
1937–1939	New Brighton	55	(0)
- * Club domestic league appearances and goals

Arthur Buxton (born 15 May 1908) was an English professional footballer who played as a left-back. He made appearances in the English Football League for Wrexham and New Brighton. He also played for Worksop Town, Bangor City and Wellington.
