= Exmouth Town F.C. =

English football club

Coordinates: 50°37′35″N 3°24′52″W

Exmouth Town
- Full name: Exmouth Town Football Club
- Nickname: The Town
- Founded: 1933
- Ground: Southern Road, Exmouth
- Capacity: 1,500
- Chairman: Stuart Shaw
- Manager: Kevin Hill
- League: Southern League Division One South
- 2025–26: Southern League Division One South, 8th of 22
Home colours	Away colours

Exmouth Town Football Club is a football club based in Exmouth, Devon, England. They are currently members of the Southern League Division One South and play at Southern Road.

== History ==
The club was established in 1933. They entered the Premier Division of the Exeter & District League in 1948, and were runners-up in 1949–50. The following season saw them win both the Devon Senior Cup and the East Devon Senior Cup in 1950–51. They were relegated after finishing bottom of the Premier Division in 1957–58, but returned to the division in 1961. The club finished as Premier Division runners-up in 1968–69 and won the Devon Premier Cup in 1970–71. After finishing as runners-up again in 1971–72, they joined the Western League in 1973. They finished bottom of the league in 1974–75 and again the following season, resulting in relegation to the newly-formed Division One.

The 1979–80 season saw Exmouth win the Devon Premier Cup for a second time. The club remained in Division One until finishing as runners-up in 1981–82, earning promotion to the Premier Division. After finishing sixteenth in their first season in the Premier Division, they were league champions in 1983–84 and again in 1985–86. Exmouth went on to finish as Premier Division runners-up in 1986–87 and again in 1988–89, a season in which they also won the Les Phillips Cup. However, a decline thereafter saw them relegated to Division One at the end of the 1993–94 season. In 2002–03 they finished as runners-up in Division One, earning promotion back to the Premier Division. However, they withdrew from the league midway through the 2005–06 season due to financial problems, with the reserve team in the Devon & Exeter League becoming the new first team.

Exmouth's first season back in the Devon & Exeter League saw them finish third, after which they became founder members of the new South West Peninsula League, earning a place in Division One East. They won the division in 2012–13 and were promoted to the Premier Division; the season also saw them win the Devon Premier Cup for a third time. In the following season they finished as Premier Division runners-up. They were runners-up again in 2021–22 season and were promoted to Division One South of the Southern League. In 2024–25 the club finished fifth in Division One South, qualifying for the promotion play-offs, in which they lost their semi-final tie against Evesham United 4–1.

=== Season-by-season ===
Season	Division	Position	Notes
1948–49	Exeter & District League Premier Division	7/16	
1949–50	Exeter & District League Premier Division	2/14	
1950–51	Exeter & District League Premier Division	3/15	
1951–52	Exeter & District League Premier Division	4/14	
1952–53	Exeter & District League Premier Division	7/14	
1953–54	Exeter & District League Premier Division	14/14	
1954–55	Exeter & District League Premier Division	3/15	
1955–56	Exeter & District League Premier Division	6/15	
1956–57	Exeter & District League Premier Division	8/15	
1957–58	Exeter & District League Premier Division	16/16	Relegated
1958–59			
1959–60			
1960–61			
1961–62	Exeter & District League Premier Division	14/16	
1962–63	Exeter & District League Premier Division	9/16	
1963–64	Exeter & District League Premier Division	12/16	
1964–65	Exeter & District League Premier Division	5/16	
1965–66	Exeter & District League Premier Division	3/15	
1966–67	Exeter & District League Premier Division	4/15	
1967–68	Exeter & District League Premier Division	4/14	
1968–69	Exeter & District League Premier Division	2/14	
1969–70	Exeter & District League Premier Division	4/14	
1970–71	Exeter & District League Premier Division	3/14	
1971–72	Exeter & District League Premier Division	2/14	
1972–73	Exeter & District League Premier Division	3/14	Promoted
1973–74	Western League	16/19	
1974–75	Western League	21/21	
1975–76	Western League	23/23	Relegated to the new Division One
1976–77	Western League Division One	14/18	
1977–78	Western League Division One	11/19	
1978–79	Western League Division One	18/19	
1979–80	Western League Division One	5/22	
1980–81	Western League Division One	3/19	
1981–82	Western League Division One	2/19	Promoted
1982–83	Western League Premier Division	16/20	
1983–84	Western League Premier Division	1/20	Champions
1984–85	Western League Premier Division	4/22	
1985–86	Western League Premier Division	1/20	Champions
1986–87	Western League Premier Division	2/22	
1987–88	Western League Premier Division	6/22	
1988–89	Western League Premier Division	2/21	
1989–90	Western League Premier Division	5/21	
1990–91	Western League Premier Division	19/21	
1991–92	Western League Premier Division	17/21	
1992–93	Western League Premier Division	11/20	
1993–94	Western League Premier Division	17/18	Relegated
1994–95	Western League Division One	9/21	
1995–96	Western League Division One	18/19	
1996–97	Western League Division One	3/20	
1997–98	Western League Division One	9/19	
1998–99	Western League Division One	7/19	
1999–00	Western League Division One	4/17	
2000–01	Western League Division One	7/19	
2001–02	Western League Division One	3/20	
2002–03	Western League Division One	2/19	Promoted
2003–04	Western League Premier Division	5/18	
2004–05	Western League Premier Division	5/20	
2005–06	Western League Premier Division	–	Withdrew mid-season, record expunged
2006–07	Devon and Exeter League Premier Division	3/15	Promoted
2007–08	South West Peninsula League Division One East	5/17	
2008–09	South West Peninsula League Division One East	15/17	
2009–10	South West Peninsula League Division One East	8/18	
2010–11	South West Peninsula League Division One East	11/16	
2011–12	South West Peninsula League Division One East	5/17	
2012–13	South West Peninsula League Division One East	1/16	Champions
2013–14	South West Peninsula League Premier Division	2/20	
2014–15	South West Peninsula League Premier Division	8/19	
2015–16	South West Peninsula League Premier Division	12/20	
2016–17	South West Peninsula League Premier Division	5/20	
2017–18	South West Peninsula League Premier Division	16/20	
2018–19	South West Peninsula League Premier Division		

== Ground ==
The club initially played at the Maer Cricket Field, before moving to the King George V Ground on Southern Road in 1964. Floodlights were installed in the 1980s and the ground's record attendance of 2,395 was set for a friendly match against Liverpool on 28 July 1987. A new 50-seat stand was installed in 2016. After promotion to the Southern League, two new stands were installed in 2023, bringing the seated capacity up to 150, with a further 150 under cover.

== Honours ==
- Western League
  - Premier Division champions 1983–84, 1985–86
  - Les Phillips Cup winners 1988–89
- South West Peninsula League
  - Division One East champions 2012–13
- Devon Senior Cup
  - Winners 1950–51
- Devon St Lukes Challenge Cup
  - Winners 1984–85, 1988–89, 1989–90
- Devon Premier Cup
  - Winners 1970–71, 1979–80, 2012–13
- East Devon Senior Cup
  - Winners 1950–51, 1982–83
- Morrison Bell Cup
  - Winners 1933–34, 1937–38, 1956–57, 1970–71, 1982–83, 1989–90, 2003–04, 2004–05

== Records ==
- Best FA Cup performance: Fourth qualifying round, 1988–89, 1989–90
- Best FA Trophy performance: Second qualifying round, 2023–24, 2024–25
- Best FA Vase performance: Semi-finals, 1984–85
- Record attendance: 2,395 vs Liverpool, friendly match, 28 July 1987

== See also ==
- Exmouth Town F.C. players
- Exmouth Town F.C. managers
