= Portway Bristol F.C. =

Portway Bristol
- Full name: Portway Bristol Football Club
- Dissolved: 1987

Portway Bristol Football Club was a non-League association football team that played in the Western League until 1987. The team played at Shirehampton Recreation Ground in Penpole Lane.

Based in the city of Bristol, England, Portway joined the First Division of the Western League in 1976. After two mid-table finishes, they were league runners-up at the end of the 1978–79 season and won promotion to the Premier Division, where they remained for four years.

After finishing bottom of the Western League Premier Division in 1983 they had another mid-table finish in Division One, followed by two successive League titles, but as they failed to meet the minimum ground requirements for promotion they remained in the first division. They were runners-up again in 1987, but after again failing to be promoted they withdrew from the league that summer.

== Honours ==
- Western Football League, Division One champions: 2

1984–85, 1985–86

- Western Football League, Division One runners-up: 2

1978–79, 1986–87

== Bibliography ==
- Jay, Mike; Byrne, Stephen (1994). Pirates in Profile: A Who's Who of Bristol Rovers Players. Bristol: Potten, Baber & Murray. ISBN 0-9524835-0-5.
