= Saltash United F.C. =

Association football club in England

Coordinates: 50°24′37″N 4°13′24″W

Saltash United
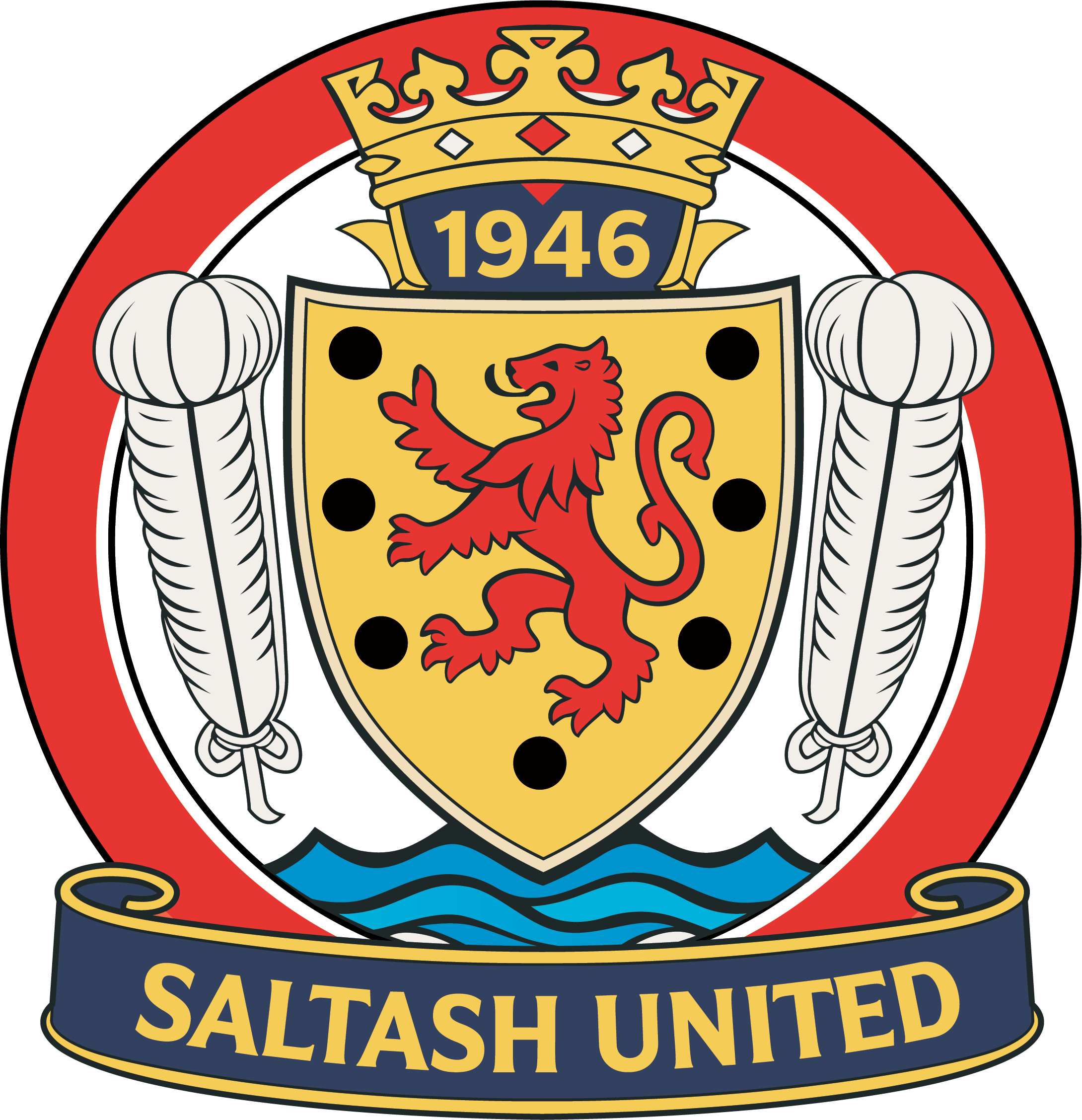
- Full name: Saltash United Football Club
- Nickname: The Ashes
- Founded: 1946; 80 years ago
- Ground: Kimberley Stadium, Saltash
- Manager: Lee Britchford
- League: Western League Premier Division
- 2025–26: Western League Premier Division, 8th of 18
- Website: saltashunited.co.uk
Home colours	Away colours

Saltash United Football Club is an English football club based in Saltash, Cornwall. They currently play in the Western League Premier Division.

Since its formation in 1946, the club has won three Western Football League Premier Division titles, one Western Football League Division One title, and two South Western League titles.

The club crest adopts the heraldic seal used by the town of Saltash for many centuries. The shield is placed between two ostrich feathers and ensigned by a crown, which are taken from the arms of the Duchy of Cornwall.

== History ==
=== Foundation, formation, and the early years ===
Football in Saltash dates back to the 1890s, with the club initially known as Essa. However, the details of its formation and origin remain unclear. Eventually, the team became known as Saltash Stars, achieving significant success, including winning the Cornwall Senior Cup three times consecutively from 1929 to 1932. Disbanded during the Second World War, the team reformed in the 1946–47 season as Saltash United.

In 1951, Saltash United won the Cornwall Senior Cup, the Charity Cup, and the Herald Cup, achieving a "Triple Crown." They joined the South Western Football League as a founder member in the 1951–52 season, finishing as runners-up and winning the inaugural South Western League Cup by defeating Torquay United reserves 3–2. The Ashes won the South Western League title in the 1953–54 season before being forced to disband in 1958. Enthusiasts led by Terry Maynard called an Extraordinary General Meeting on 22 July 1959, leading to the unanimous reformation of Saltash United. The club joined the newly formed East Cornwall League in the 1960–61 season.

Former player Alan Armstrong managed the team in the 1969–70 season, winning the South Western League Cup. The following season, David Lean left Plymouth Argyle to become player-manager of Saltash United.

=== Western League years (1976–95) ===
Saltash United entered and won the 1976–77 Western League Division One at their first attempt. Peter Darke guided the club to a 4th-place finish in their first season in the Western League Premier Division. Despite a 3rd-place finish in 1978–79, the club dropped to 9th place the following season.

After finishing 2nd in the 1983–84 season, the club won its first Western League Premier Division title in 1984–85. Saltash United won the league again in 1986–87 and 1988–89. In the 1987–88 season, the club had its best FA Cup run to date, reaching the fourth qualifying round before losing 4–2 to Farnborough F.C.

=== South Western League (1995–2007) ===
Due to high travelling expenses, the club returned to the South Western League by the end of the 1994–95 season. League success eluded them, with only the Durning Lawrence Charity Cup, won in 2000–01, to show for their efforts.

Allan Evans became team manager in 2002, bringing new players and a new approach to club discipline and training. Despite rejoining the Western League First Division for two seasons in 2004–05 and 2005–06, the club once again returned to the South Western League, achieving a 3rd-place finish.

=== South West Peninsula League (2007–2021) ===
The 2007–08 season saw the club join the newly formed South West Peninsula League finishing the inaugural season as runners-up. On 29 May 2013, Saltash announced Martin Burgess as team manager, succeeding Stuart Dudley who resigned at the end of the 2012–13 season. On 21 January 2015, Burgess stepped down as team manager with the Ashes only a point behind the league leaders citing player priorities and squad availability as the reasons for his resignation.

The 2015–16 season saw Matthew Cusack appointed team manager alongside assistant Dane Bunney, both former Saltash players. Despite starting with only 8 registered players, they guided the Ashes to a sixth-place finish. The Ashes started the 2016–17 season strongly under Cusack with the club breaking their record for most consecutive wins at the start of a season, beating St Blazey 5–0 on 27 August 2016. The following season, 2017–18, Saltash lifted the Cornwall Senior Cup for the first time in 25 years, having lost on their last five Senior Cup final appearances.

Bunney was appointed team manager following Cusack's resignation in March 2020 to join Plymouth Parkway as head coach. He guided the club to its longest FA Cup run since the 1991–92 season and were joint top of the Peninsula League Premier West table when the season was curtailed. In 2021 they were promoted to the Premier Division of the Western League based on their results in the abandoned 2019–20 and 2020–21 seasons.

=== 2021-present ===
Dane Bunney parted company with Saltash at the end of April 2022 and the club replaced him with Danny Lewis and Shane Krac.

In the 2022–23 season they were runners-up in Western League Premier Division, qualifying for an inter-step play-off against Bristol Manor Farm from the level above, which they lost 2–0.

== Stadium ==
Saltash United play their home games at Kimberley Stadium, Callington Road, Saltash, Cornwall, PL12 6DX. The ground is floodlit with a covered seated stand and licensed clubhouse.

Constructed in 1951 by Saltash Town Council, the club moved to Kimberley Stadium for the start of the 1952–53 season. Declaring the stadium opened, the Mayor, Miss W. M. Fearnside kicked off the first home match of the season on 27 August 1952. About 1000 spectators saw Saltash defeat Tavistock 5-1.

The main grandstand was named the Tim Halford Stand on 12 July 2008. Halford was the club's manager when he died in September 2007 at the age of 45.

== Honours ==
Saltash United's list of honours include the following.

Honour	Number	Years
League
Western Football League Champions (tier 9)	3	1984–85, 1986–87, 1988–89
Western Football League Runners-up (tier 9)	3	1983–84, 1987–88, 2022–23
Western Football League Division One Champions (tier 10)	1	1976–77
South West Peninsula League Premier Division Runners-up (tier 10)	2	2007–08, 2016–17
South Western League Champions (tier 11)	2	1953–54, 1975–76
South Western League Runners-up (tier 11)	3	1952–53, 1973–74, 1974–75
Domestic Cups
Western Football League Cup Winners	2	1986–87, 1987–88
Cornwall Senior Cup Winners	7	1950–51, 1974–75, 1981–82, 1987–88, 1990–91, 1992–93, 2017–18
Cornwall Senior Cup Runners-up	9	1951-52, 1980–81, 1986–87, 1988–89, 2003–04, 2007–08, 2011–12, 2016–17, 2018–19
South West Peninsula League Walter C Parson Cup Winners	1	2018–19
South West Peninsula League Charity Bowl Winners	2	2007–08, 2019–20
South Western League Cup Winners	2	1952–53, 1969–70
Cornwall FA Charity Cup Winners	2	1950–51, 2000–01
South West Counties Pratten Cup Winners	1	1974–75
South West Counties Pratten Cup Runners-up	1	1975–76

== Records ==
- Best FA Cup performance: FA Cup fourth round Qualifying (1987–88)
- Best FA Trophy performance: First Round (1985–86, 1986–87)
- Best FA Vase performance: Third Round (1996–97, 2013–14, 2018–19)
- Most League goals in a season (by team): 127 (1974–75, South Western League, 36 games)
- Most League points in a season: 90 (2016–17, South West Peninsula League Premier Division, 38 games)

== Sponsorship ==
The club’s current sportswear manufacturer is VX3 Sportswear. The main home shirt sponsor is Bright Solicitors, while Brunel Recycling Ltd sponsors the away shirt.
