= Elmore F.C. =

Association football club in England

Coordinates: 50°54′21.61″N 3°28′27.47″W

Elmore
- Full name: Elmore Football Club
- Nickname: The Eagles
- Founded: 1947
- Ground: Horsdon Park, Tiverton
- Chairman: Jed Hewitt
- Manager: Luke Andrews
- League: Devon League
- 2025–26: Devon League, 10th of 17
Home colours	Away colours

Elmore Football Club is a football club based in Tiverton, Devon, England. They are currently members of the Devon League and play at Horsdon Park.

== History ==
The club was founded in 1947 as the Elmore Sports Club. They joined Junior Division One of the Exeter & District League in 1953, and were runners-up in their first two seasons. After finishing as runners-up again in 1959–60, the 1960–61 season saw the club win the Devon Junior Cup, the Football Express Cup, and the Junior Division One East title, resulting in promotion to Senior Division One. Elmore were Senior Division One runners-up in 1964–65 and were promoted to the Premier Division. They shared the Geary Cup with Exmouth Town in 1968–69, and in 1971–72 the club won the East Devon Senior Cup, beating Dawlish Town 3–2 in the final. The Exeter & District League was renamed the Devon & Exeter League in 1972.

In 1974 Elmore moved up to the South Western League. They won the East Devon Senior Cup again in 1975–76, and the Devon Senior Cup the following season. The club remained in the South Western League for four seasons, before transferring to Division One of the Western League in 1978. After finishing bottom of the division in 1988–89, they won the Les Phillips Cup and were Division One runners-up in 1990–91, resulting in promotion to the Premier Division. The 1994–95 season saw them win the Les Phillips Cup again and finish as runners-up in the Premier Division, finishing one point below neighbours Tiverton Town. Two seasons later, Elmore finished bottom of the Premier Division, but avoided relegation as the division was expanded from 18 to 20 clubs. They finished bottom of the division again in 2003–04 and were relegated back to Division One. The next few seasons saw the club struggle, conceding over 100 goals in five of the next nine seasons and finishing bottom of the league in 2005–06 and 2010–11.

At the end of the 2012–13 season Elmore transferred to the Premier Division of the South West Peninsula League. However, they withdrew from the league midway through the 2014–15 season, after which the reserve team in the Devon & Exeter League became the first team. The club were Premier Division champions in 2017–18, earning promotion to Division One East of the South West Peninsula League. League restructuring saw them become members of the Premier Division East for the 2019–20 season.

== Ground ==
Following their establishment, the club moved grounds on a regular basis. In 1958 they bought a plot of land named Slaughterhouse Field and built a new ground, Horsdon Park. In March 2011 the main stand was named after Adam Stansfield, a former player who went on to play professionally with Yeovil Town and Exeter City but died from cancer aged 31 in 2010.

== Honours ==
- Western League
  - Les Phillips Cup winners 1990–91, 1994–95
- Devon & Exeter League
  - Premier Division champions 2017–18
  - Junior Division One East champions 1960–61
  - Football Express Cup winners 1960–61
  - Geary Cup winners 1968–69
- Devon Senior Cup
  - Winners 1976–77
- East Devon Senior Cup
  - Winners 1971–72, 1975–76
- Devon Junior Cup
  - Winners 1960–61

== Records ==
- Best FA Cup performance: Second qualifying round, 1993–94, 1998–99
- Best FA Vase performance: Fourth round, 1994–95
- Record attendance: 1,713 vs Tiverton Town, Western League Premier Division, 14 April 1995
- Biggest win: 17–0
- Most appearances: P. Webber

== See also ==
- Elmore F.C. players
- Elmore F.C. managers
