= Swanage Town & Herston F.C. =

Association football club in England

Coordinates: 50°37′11″N 1°57′43″W

Swanage Town & Herston
- Full name: Swanage Town & Herston Football Club
- Nickname: Swans
- Founded: 1898
- Ground: Days Park, Swanage
- Chairman: Mark Watson
- Manager: Tony Parrott
- League: Dorset Premier League
- 2024–25: Dorset Premier League, 6th of 16
Home colours

Swanage Town & Herston Football Club is a football club based in Swanage, Dorset, England. The club is affiliated to the Dorset County Football Association. They are currently members of the Dorset Premier League.

== History ==
The club was formed in 1898 as Swanage Albion Football Club, joining the Dorset Junior League and winning the Dorset Junior Cup in their first season. The club then made it to the Dorset Senior League during the 1920s. The 1920s also saw the club move from their original ground at Swanage Middle School, to Days Park and change their name to Swanage Town.

In the 1957–58 season the club became one of the founder members of the Dorset Combination League. The first season in the league proved very successful as the club became the leagues first winners. The next five seasons saw the club finish in the top two, by winning the league three times in a row for the 1959–60, 1960–61 and 1961–62 campaigns, and finishing Runners up for the 1958–59, and 1962–63 seasons. The 1961–62 campaign also saw the club enter the FA Cup for the first time in their history, losing to Bridport in the first qualifying round.

In 1966 Swanage Town merged with local side Herston Rovers F.C., who had been playing in the Dorset Combination league for five seasons, and the club was renamed Swanage Town & Herston F.C.. The club then stayed in the Dorset Combination League for another ten seasons, until the end of the 1975–76 competition when they left the league to join the newly reformed Division One of the Western Football League.

After eleven seasons in Division the club gained promotion to the Premier Division, when they finished as Champions in the Division. The 1989–90 campaign saw the club play their last season in the Western league as they then joined the Wessex Football League. The last season in the Western league saw the club clinch the Dorset Senior Cup for the first and only time, when they beat Weymouth 1–0 in the final. The first season in the Wessex Football League saw the club finish runners-up. The 1990–91 season also saw the club reach the Dorset Senior Cup final again, but this time lost to Weymouth 5–1.

The 1995–96 season saw the club finish bottom of the Wessex league, and they were relegated back to the Dorset Combination league. After four seasons in the Dorset Combination league, the club rejoined the Wessex league. However they could only spend two seasons in the league as their second season back saw them finish bottom of the league and relegated to the Dorset Premier Football League The 2007–08 season saw the club finish bottom of the Premier League, but they escaped relegation to the Dorset Football League as luckily for them there was no relegation that season. Two seasons later the club under the management of Jason Phillips, became winners of the Dorset Premier Football League Cup. In the 2016–17 season the Swans regained the Dorset Premier Football League Cup beating Gillingham Town reserves 2–0 in the final.

== Stadium ==
Swanage Town & Herston play their home games at Days Park, Swanage, Dorset, BH19 1NN.

The ground was named after James Day who was the mayor of Swanage in the 1930s, who had the ground created in 1925 and gave it to the town in 1935. The 1981–82 season saw the ground gain floodlights. The ground originally had a slope, but this was levelled out in 1951.

== Honours ==
=== League honours ===
- Wessex Football League:
  - Runners-up (1): 1990–91
- Western Football League Division One:
  - Winners (1): 1986–87
- Dorset Combination League:
  - Winners (4): 1957–58^{†}, 1959–60^{†}, 1960–61^{†}, 1961–62^{†}
  - Runners-up (2): 1958–59^{†}, 1962–63^{†}

=== Cup honours ===
- Dorset Senior Cup:
  - Winners (1): 2011–12
  - Runners-up (1): 1990–91
- Dorset Premier Football League Cup:
  - Winners (1): 2009–10 & 2016–17
  - Runners-up (1): 1959–60^{†}
- Dorset Junior Cup:
  - Winners (1): 1898^{†}
- ^{†} Won before the merger with Herston Rovers.

== Records ==
- Highest League Position: 2nd in Wessex League 1990–91
- FA Cup best performance: Second qualifying round 1987–88, 1988–89, 1989–90, 1990–91
- FA Vase best performance: Second round 1979–80, 1981–82, 1987–88, 1991–92

== Former players ==
A list of players that have played for the club at one stage and meet one of the following criteria;

1. Players that have played/managed in the football league or any foreign equivalent to this level (i.e. fully professional league).
2. Players with full international caps.
- (Philippines) Chad Gould
- (Wales) Horace Cumner
