= Torrington F.C. =

Association football club in England

Coordinates: 50°57′13.6″N 4°08′35.3″W

- Full name: Torrington Football Club
- Nicknames: Torrie, The Super Greens
- Founded: 1908
- Ground: Vicarage Field
- Chairman: Ant Grills
- Manager: Tony Radford
- League: South West Peninsula League Premier Division East
- 2024–25: South West Peninsula League Premier Division East, 15th of 16
Home colours

Torrington Football Club are an English association football club based in Great Torrington, Devon. Founded in 1908, the club currently compete in the South West Peninsula League Premier Division East. Based at Vicarage Field, Torrington have previously played in the Western League, South Western League and Devon and Exeter League, and rejoined the North Devon League in 2007.

Known by the nicknames "Torrie" and "The Super Greens", Torrington have won a number of local honours, including one Western League Division One title, five North Devon League Premier Division titles and one North Devon League Senior Division title. They have also won a number of local cup tournaments, including the Combe Martin Cup, Arlington Cup and Torridge Cup.

== History ==
=== 1908–1978: Early years and North Devon League ===
Torrington Football Club was founded in 1908, and was originally known to be "a church side", with reverends playing for the club as late as 1914. The team quickly established themselves as consistent contenders in the Premier Division of the North Devon Football League (then called the Senior Division), winning the league title for the first time in the 1912–13 season, the penultimate season before the break during World War I. In the first season after the war, they were crowned champions for the second time, and also won the inaugural Hansen Cup thanks to a 1–0 win over Bideford. Torrington continued performing in the top-flight of the North Devon League for several decades.

In the 1948–49 season, the club won their third North Devon League Senior Division title, and also broke a number of club records. One of these records was an 18–0 win over Ilfracombe Town, in which "scoring phenomenon" Sid Trickett is rumoured to have scored all 18 goals with headers. Ten years later, they were crowned Senior Division champions for a fourth time, and also won the Combe Martin Cup for the first time with a 2–0 victory over Appledore.

The club also briefly played in the Devon and Exeter League, winning the Senior Division title in 1973 and the Premier Division title in 1974.

=== 1978–2007: South Western and Western Leagues ===
At the beginning of the 1978–79 season, Torrington made their first step up from the North Devon Football League to the South Western Football League. The team struggled in their first two seasons, finishing 17th and 15th out of 19 teams, but in both 1980–81 and 1982–83 they were crowned runners-up of the division, in both cases behind champions St Blazey. In the first of those two successful seasons, they also won the South Western League Cup.

Torrington were elected to join the Western Football League for the 1984–85 season, beginning in Division One but achieving immediate promotion to the Premier Division after they finished second in the league, just one point behind champions Portway Bristol. In this season, the club also achieved their furthest progression in the FA Vase, reaching the fifth round of the tournament before being knocked out by Steyning Town. For their first few seasons in the Premier Division, Torrington struggled to move out of the bottom half of the league table, but in 1990–91 they finished second in the league.

They remained in the Premier Division until 1998, usually finishing in the top eight, before finishing with just 14 points (18 fewer than 19th-placed Chard Town) to suffer relegation back to Division One. In 2002–03, the club won their first Western League Division One championship.

=== 2007–present: Return to the North Devon League and promotion ===
At the end of the 2006–07 season, despite a last-minute survival in the league due to results elsewhere, Torrington were forced to withdraw from the Western League due to financial difficulties, announcing on 20 June 2007 that they would be returning to the North Devon League alongside their reserve team. In their first season back in the North Devon League, the club won the Combe Martin Cup for the first time since 1959. They then defended the cup the following year, when they also won the Senior Division title for the first time.

At the end of 2018–19 the South West Peninsula League was restructured, and Torrington successfully applied for a double promotion to the Premier Division East, at Step 6 of the National League System.

== Ground and support ==
Torrington play their home games at Vicarage Field, on School Lane in Great Torrington. In the 2004–05 season, Torrington's attendance at home games ranged between 72 and 245 people, with an average crowd of 108; in 2005–06, this reduced to an average of 85, with a range between 32 and 189; and in 2006–2007, the club's latest season in the Western League, average attendance fell further to 44, with a maximum of just 100 people in attendance.

== Non-playing staff ==
The current manager of Torrington is Tony Radford, with his assistant Alex Jones, and coach Kevin Weir. Previous manager Birch joined the Super Greens in 2020 along with then manager Liam Dart before he took the reins in February 2022. Previous managers of the club include former Fulham and Torquay United defender Robbie Herrera and former Torquay United and Plymouth Argyle winger David Pook. Portsmouth full back Kieth Viney.

== Club honours ==
=== League ===
- Western League Division One: 1
  - 2002–03
- Devon and Exeter League Premier Division: 1
  - 1973–74
- Devon and Exeter League Senior Division: 1
  - 1972–73
- North Devon League Premier Division: 5
  - 1912–13, 1919–20, 1948–49, 1958–59, 1984–85
- North Devon League Senior Division: 1
  - 2008–09
- North Devon League Intermediate Division One: 1
  - 2003–04

=== Cups ===
- South Western League Cup: 1
  - 1980–81
- Devon and Exeter League Cup: 1
  - 1973–74
- Arlington Cup: 4
  - 1930–31, 1934–35, 2002–03, 2003–04
- Combe Martin Cup: 3
  - 1958–59, 2007–08, 2008–09
- Battle of Britain Cup: 1
  - 1996–97
- Torridge Cup: 14
  - 1926–27, 1927–28, 1948–49, 1954–55, 1955–56, 1958–59, 1975–76, 1982–83, 1988–89, 1992–93, 1993–94, 1995–96, 2002–03, 2003–04
