= Ottery St Mary A.F.C. =

Association football club in England

Coordinates: 50°45′25.73″N 3°16′24.79″W

Ottery St. Mary
- Full name: Ottery St. Mary Football Club
- Nickname: The Otters
- Founded: 1911
- Ground: Washbrook Meadows
- Chairman: Mark Isaacs
- Manager: Pat Curtis ‘ Riki Pitter
- League: Devon League
- 2024–25: Devon League, 9th of 16
Home colours	Away colours

Ottery St. Mary A.F.C., nicknamed "The Otters", is a football club based in Ottery St Mary, Devon, England. The club is affiliated to the Devon County Football Association. They play in the Devon League.

== History ==
The club was established in 1911. After the Second World War, the club played in the Exeter and Devon League, which in 1972 was renamed the Devon and Exeter league. They joined the South Western Football League in 1974, after winning the Devon and Exeter League the season before. After only two seasons, Ottery moved on to the Western League's newly created Division One. The club's fifth season in Division One marked their debut in the FA Cup, when they lost to Newquay 8–0 in the preliminary qualifying round. The 1989–90 season saw the club earn a further upward move – finishing in top position in the First Division and earning a place in the Premier Division. Two seasons of struggle in the Premier Division ensued, and after relegation another two seasons of struggle in Division One.

At the end of the 1993–94 season the club finished bottom of Division One and joined the Devon County League. The club remained in the Devon County League, with a best placing achieved in the 2005–06 season of 4th, until 2007 when it joined the newly formed South West Peninsula League Division One East. During 2011–12 the club resigned from the South West Peninsula League and left the league at the end of the season finishing bottom of the league with just 5 points. The club joined the Devon and Exeter League in Division Three, under new manager Graham Varley.

== Ground ==
Ottery St Mary AFC play their home games at Washbrook Meadows, Butts Road, Ottery St. Mary, Devon, EX11 1EL.

== Honours ==
=== League honours ===
- Western Football League Division One:
  - Winners (1): 1989–90
- Devon and Exeter Football League Premier Division:
  - Winners (1): 1973–74
  - Runners up (1): 1962–63
- Devon and Exeter Football League Senior Division:
  - Winners (2): 1953–54, 1961–62

=== Cup honours ===
- Devon St Lukes Cup:
  - Runners-up (1): 1987–88
- Devon Senior Cup:
  - Winners (1): 1987–88
- EAST Devon Senior Cup:
  - Winners (1): 1984–85
  - Runners-up (2): 1966–67, 1974–75,
- Football Express Cup:
  - Winners (1): 1911–12
- Throgmorton Cup:
  - Winners (1): 1998–99
  - Runners-up (1): 2005–06
- Axminster Hospital Cup:
  - Winners (6): 1951–52, 1955–56, 1962–63, 1965–66, 1966–67, 1969–70
- Golesworthy Cup:
  - Winners (1): 2015–16
  - Runners-up (2): 1928–29, 1933–1934
- Grandisson Cup:
  - Winners (3): 1958–59, 1962–63, 1963–64, 1999–00,
  - Runners-up (1): 1973–74,
- Morrison Bell Cup:
  - Winners (8): 1951–52, 1953–54, 1959–60, 1963–64, 1965–66, 1972–73, 1977–78, 1987–88,
  - Runners-up (5): 1952–53, 1954–55, 1955–56, 1957–58, 1960–61
- Seaton Challenge Cup:
  - Winners (3): 1952–53, 1957–58, 1960–61,
  - Runners-up (2): 1956–57, 1959–60,
- Geary Cup:
  - Winners (1): 1966–67,
  - Runners-up (2): 1950–51, 1958–1959,

== Records ==
- Highest League Position: 18th in Western League premier Division 1990–91
- FA Cup best performance: Second Qualifying Round 1987–88
- FA Vase best performance: Third round 1980–81

== Former players ==
1. Players that have played/managed in the football league or any foreign equivalent to this level (i.e. fully professional league).
2. Players with full international caps.
- (England) Dick Ebdon
- (Wales) Phil Roberts
- (England) David Pook

== Former coaches ==
1. Managers/Coaches that have played/managed in the football league or any foreign equivalent to this level (i.e. fully professional league).
2. Managers/Coaches with full international caps.
- (Wales) Jason Rees
