= Ilfracombe Town A.F.C. =

Association football club in England

Coordinates: 51°12′09.03″N 4°06′56.04″W

Ilfracombe Town
- Full name: Ilfracombe Town Association Football Club
- Nickname: The Bluebirds
- Founded: 1902
- Stadium: Marlborough Park
- Capacity: 2,000 (50 seated)
- Chairman: Nick Jupp
- Manager: Jack Jenkins
- League: South West Peninsula League Premier Division East
- 2025–26: South West Peninsula League Premier Division East, 9th of 16
Home colours	Away colours

Ilfracombe Town Association Football Club is a football club based in Ilfracombe, Devon, England. They are currently members of the South West Peninsula League Premier Division East and play at Marlborough Park, situated high on a hill overlooking the Bristol Channel.

== History ==
The club was established in 1902 as Ilfracombe Football Club. They were founder members of the North Devon League in 1904 and played in the league's first match, a 4–2 win at Pilton Yeo Vale. However, the club left the league at the end of the 1905–06 season. A team under the name Ilfracombe Devonia joined the league in 1908–09 and was replaced by Ilfracombe Town in the following season. Ilfracombe Town finished bottom of the Senior Division in 1919–20. Although they were Senior Division runners-up in 1921–22, the club finished bottom of the Senior Division again in 1922–23, and left to join the East Devon League. Ilfracombe returned to the North Devon League in the mid-1920s, but left before the end of the decade. Returning to the league in 1931, they were runners-up in 1931–32.

After World War II, Ilfracombe played in the Premier Division of the Exeter & District League. Despite only finishing twelfth in the division in 1948–49, the club moved up to the Western League, becoming a founder member of its new Division Three. They were runners-up in their first season in the division, earning promotion to Division Two. The club were Division Two runners-up in 1952–53 and were promoted to Division One. However, after finishing bottom of Division One in 1954–55, they were relegated back to Division Two. In 1959, the club left the Western League, returning to the North Devon League in 1960. They were Senior Division champions in 1966–67. The division was renamed the Premier Division in 1969 and the club were champions again in 1970–71, 1981–82 (winning all 26 league matches) and 1982–83.

After finishing as Premier Division runners-up in 1983–84, Ilfracombe rejoined the Western League, entering Division One. The club finished bottom of the division in their first season back in the league, and again in 1995–96. However, after finishing third in Division One in 2006–07, the club were promoted to the Premier Division. In 2014, they resigned from the Western League, with the first team replacing the reserves in the Premier Division of the North Devon League. The club won the Premier Division title in 2016–17, and were promoted to Division One East of the South West Peninsula League. Following league reorganisation at the end of the 2018–19 season, the club were elevated to the Premier Division East. In 2021 they were promoted to the Premier Division of the Western League based on their results in the abandoned 2019–20 and 2020–21 seasons.

In 2024–25 Ilfracombe finished second-from-bottom of the Western League Premier Division and were relegated back to the Premier Division East of the South West Peninsula League.

For the 2026-2027 season Ilfracombe will remain in the South West Peninsula League after finishing 9th in the 2025-2026 season. The club has also reintroduced the Reserves Team back into the North Devon League System with Manager Kenny Robertson taking charge after a successful spell at youth football level.

Ilfracombe Town also run a walking football team with matches being played at Ilfracombe College on a Thursday Night.

== Ground ==
The club play at Marlborough Park. The site was bought in 1923 and the ground developed during the 1924–25 season. The ground currently has a capacity of 2,000, of which 60 is seated and 450 covered.

== Honours ==
- North Devon League
  - Premier Division champions 1966–67, 1970–71, 1981–82, 1982–83
  - Brayford Cup winners 1980–81, 1981–82, 1983–84
  - Combe Martin Cup winners 1963–64
  - Challenge Cup winners 1960–61, 1962–63

== Records ==
- Best FA Cup best performance: Fourth qualifying round, 1952–53
- Best FA Vase best performance: Third round, 2011–12
- Record attendance: 3,000 vs Bristol City
- Most appearances: Bob Hancock, 459
- Most goals: Kevin Squire

== See also ==
- Ilfracombe Town A.F.C. players
- Ilfracombe Town A.F.C. managers
