= Chard Town F.C. =

Association football club in England

Coordinates: 50.8752°N 2.9660°W

Chard Town
- Full name: Chard Town Football Club
- Nickname: The Robins
- Founded: 1920
- Ground: Dening Sports Fields, Chard
- Chairman: Mark Parris
- League: Somerset County League Premier Division
- 2025–26: Somerset County League Premier Division, 10th of 15
Home colours	Away colours

Chard Town Football Club is a football club based in Chard, Somerset, England. Affiliated to the Somerset County FA, they are currently members of the Somerset County League Premier Division and play at Dening Sports Fields.

== History ==
The club was established in 1920. They became members of the Perry Street & District League and won the league's Challenge Cup in 1930–31. After winning the cup again in 1937–38, the club were league champions in 1939–40. After World War II Chard joined the Somerset County League. They were Division Two champions in 1949–50 and won the Somerset Senior Cup in 1952–53. The club were Division One champions the following season. After winning the league for a second time in 1959–60, they won the Senior Cup again in 1966–67, and went on to win the league the following season. The club were champions again in 1969–70.

In 1976 Chard moved up to the Western League, becoming members of the new Division One. They were Division One runners-up in 1983–84, earning promotion to the Premier Division. Although the club were relegated after finishing bottom of the Premier Division in 1986–87, they were Division One runners-up again the following season and were promoted back to the Premier Division. The club won the South West Counties Cup in 1988–89, but were relegated again at the end of the 1992–93 season, and remained in Division One until a second-place finish in 1995–96 saw them return to the Premier Division.

Chard were relegated in 1997–98 after finishing second-from-bottom of the Premier Division. They were Division One runners-up in 2005–06 and were promoted to the Premier Division for the fourth time. However, they were relegated back to Division One three seasons later. The club resigned from the Western League at the end of the 2017–18 season and dropped into the Premier Division of the Somerset County League.

== Honours ==
- Somerset County League
  - Division One champions 1953–54, 1959–60, 1967–68, 1969–70
  - Division Two champions 1949–50
- Perry Street & District League
  - Champions 1939–40
  - Challenge Cup winners 1930–31, 1937–38
- Somerset Senior Cup
  - Winners 1952–53, 1966–67
- South West Counties Cup
  - Winners 1988–89

== Records ==
- Best FA Cup performance: Second qualifying round, 1977–78, 1982–83
- Best FA Trophy performance: First qualifying round, 1985–86
- Best FA Vase performance: Fourth round, 1989–90

== See also ==
- Chard Town F.C. players
