= Westbury United F.C. =

Association football club in England

Coordinates: 51°15′52″N 2°11′19″W

Westbury United
- Full name: Westbury United Football Club
- Nickname: The White Horse Men
- Founded: 1920
- Ground: Meadow Lane, Westbury
- Chairman: Mark Nickels
- Manager: Ricky Hulbert and Lewis Porter
- League: Southern League Division One South
- 2025–26: Southern League Division One South, 10th of 22
Home colours	Away colours

Westbury United Football Club are a football club based in Westbury, Wiltshire, England. They are currently members of the Southern League Division One South and play at Meadow Lane.

== History ==
The club started in 1920 when two local sides amalgamated. Westbury Old Comrades FC had just won promotion to the First Division of the Wiltshire County League, and to strengthen the side they joined forces with a local junior side, Westbury Great Western Railway XI, and together they became Westbury United Football Club.

In its first season, the Club finished third from bottom of the County league and in the 1920s, they struggled. However, in the 1930s, they won everything possible in Wiltshire football. In 1936, the Club reached the First Round Proper of the FA Cup. They were led by a magnificent player, Billy Pearce, who captained the County throughout the decade. Also in the side at the time was prolific goal scorer Bill Butler, who scored more than eighty senior goals in one season, and thirty in one month.

The Club purchased and moved to its present ground in Meadow Lane in 1934, the cost of the four-acre site being £475. The first game played on what was then the Jubilee Playing Field was against Bristol City and a crowd of around 4000 attended.

The club has produced many players who have gone on to make the grade at professional football, two of them being centre forwards for Bristol City. The first was Reg Smith who played for City in the 1930s and was then transferred to Wolverhampton Wanderers for what was described in the Press as a 'considerable fee'. The other was John Atyeo, for whom City played a presentation game against Westbury and made a donation of £100. Atyeo played over 600 games for City and scored 359 goals; he also played six times for England in which he netted five goals. He died suddenly in June 1993, aged 61, and now has a grandstand named after him at City's Ashton Gate ground as well as a street in his home village of Dilton Marsh (a few miles from Meadow Lane).

The club has strong family traditions. Wilf Alford left Westbury before the last War to play for then First Division Portsmouth. His son, Phil, managed the Reserve Team for many years as well as stints helping at First Team level, while his grandsons have also played for the club.

Westbury joined the Western League in 1984 and initially struggled. In 1988, floodlights were erected and Southampton were the visitors for the official switch-on. Season 1988–89 saw the club win its first honour in the League, winning the Sportsmanship Trophy. In 1991, under the management of Ian Harris, they won the First Division title to gain promotion to the Premier Division. The highest League placing to date came in the 1994–95 season when they finished fifth.

The club has had its share of dedicated officials who have given a lifetime of service. Former Club President, Ernie Barber, who died in December 2012, carried the team kit as a seven-year-old in 1933, and after the war he started playing. When he finished playing he became Secretary and held the post until the end of the 1996–97 season when he decided to retire.

== Recent years ==
In recent years the club has, with the help of the Football Stadia Improvement Fund, been able to replace the drainage system on the pitch as well as erect fencing around the ground and a wall around the pitch. Following several seasons in the 2000s where the aim of promotion to the Toolstation Premier League wasn't achieved, long standing manager Paul Brickley stood down and there were six seasons of struggle from 2010 to 2011 till 2015–16 under various managers, with the team finishing in the bottom three every time.

Matthew Bright took over as chairman in November 2014, installing Shaun Gardner as 1st team manager. Bright aims to make the club more family orientated and make Westbury United the centre of the local community. The club now have a strong link with the local youth football club, Westbury Youth FC, which provides a pathway for youth footballers. Gardner's team finished the 2014–15 season bottom of the league table but avoided relegation. In September 2015, Gardner resigned as first team manager. His assistant manager, James Goddard, was appointed as his successor after three games in temporary charge. Westbury finished the 2015–16 season in 20th position.

Season 2016–17 started with them winning half of their games up until the middle of November, followed by a run of nine games with only one win and one draw. Morale amongst the players was low and the officers of the club were concerned Westbury would be involved in another relegation battle; the decision was made to relieve James Goddard from his duties at the club after a home defeat by Chippenham Park, at that time a relegation rival.

Westbury's reserve manager, Marc Lanfear, stepped in to lead the first team whilst a new manager was sought. He was assisted for those two matches by Nathan Hallett-Young; they won both of their games against two of the top three teams in the division.

Father and son, Neil and Joe Kirkpatrick, were appointment joint managers on 1 February 2017. They suffered defeat in their first three league games in charge, but after that they oversaw a five league game winning streak, the first time Westbury United achieved this since 2009.

Westbury started the 2017–18 season with three teams: the first team competing in the Toolstation Western League Division One, the Reserves competing in the Wiltshire Senior League and the Development Team in the Trowbridge and District League.

The Kirkpatricks had attracted a strong group of players and Westbury started the season amongst the favorites to be promoted. They started the season well, staying unbeaten for the first 13 league games, winning 8 and drawing 5. Chairman Matt Bright stepped down in early October to spend more time with his family, and Secretary Greg Coulson was elected to become chairman at a Special General Meeting in early November. The club won the First Division and secured promotion to the Premier Division. They scored more points (95, previous best 91) and more goals (97, previous best 95), and conceded the fewest goals (29, previous best 39) in the club's history.

The 2018–19 season saw Westbury stay unbeaten until Boxing Day (17 games, 14 wins and 3 draws) before losing to local rivals Bradford Town FC 1–0 at home. They continued their good form and ended up finishing in their joint highest league position ever, 5th place with 74 points. In their first venture into the FA Cup since 2010 they reached the first qualifying round, beating Cribbs and Saltash before being knocked-out by Bitton. In the FA Vase they got to the first round proper, where Saltash took their revenge and earned a 2–1 win on a very windy day. They also got to the semi-final of the Wiltshire FA Senior Cup, before losing 4-1 (aet) to Swindon Supermarine FA.

The highlight of the 2019–20 season was their match against Swindon Town FC – the county's only professional team – in the quarter-final of the newly formed Wiltshire FA Senior Shield competition, where Westbury lost 7–0. The season was brought to a premature end due to COVID-19 with Westbury positioned 12th in the league. It also saw the end of the Kirkpatricks' reign after three successful years at the club.

Ex-players Lewis Porter and Ricky Hulbert were installed as joint managers for the start of the 2020–21 season, which was curtailed due to the COVID-19 pandemic. Season 2021–22 saw Westbury United moved into the Hellenic League after the FA took the opportunity to restructure the national league system. The team finished second after just four defeats, and achieved promotion to the Southern League on a points-per-game basis. During the off season Chairman Greg Coulson stepped down to concentrate on his career, he was quickly replaced by former first team manager Sam Gooding. Sam immediately set about maintaining the link with Westbury Youth FC and planned to bring Westbury its first ever adult ladies football team.

With Westbury United being promoted to step 4 of the English pyramid, for the first time in the clubs history. Ricky Hulbert and Lewis Porter's side endured an excellent season. Finishing 10th in the Southern League Division One South, before then going on to be crowned Wiltshire Premier Shield Champions in May 2023. Beating Swindon Town 3–0 at The County Ground.

== FA competitions ==
The club has competed in the FA Cup in most seasons since 1922, with the highlight being reaching the First Round Proper in 1937–38, losing to London side Walthamstow Avenue at home by 3–1. They are one of the few clubs to have taken part in every FA Vase since that competition's inception, but have yet to reach the later stages – their best showing being reaching the third round (last 64), on three occasions.

== Ground ==
Westbury United play their home matches at Meadow Lane. The ground has two small stands, one being along the length of the pitch with 96 seats, and the other in one corner behind the goal. Trees that surround the ground make it look enclosed, and there is plenty of space for additional stands to be built if necessary. The pitch has a small wall around the outside, and a set of nets behind one goal to stop balls from going into the adjacent housing. The ground has a café on match days and a licensed bar which is open to the public. The clubhouse contains a licensed bar, a skittles alley and a pool table.

== Honours ==
- Western Football League Division One
  - Champions (2) 1991–92, 2017–18
- Wiltshire Premier Shield
  - Champions (1) 2022-23
- Wiltshire County FA Senior Cup
  - Winners (4) 1931–32, 1932–33, 1947–48, 1951–52
  - Runners up (2) 1933–34, 1963–64

== Records ==
- FA Cup
  - First Round 1937–38
- FA Trophy
  - First Qualifying Round 2022–23, 2023–24, 2024–25, 2025–26
- FA Vase
  - Third Round 1977–78, 1994–95, 2003–04
