= Bridport F.C. =

Association football club in England

Coordinates: 50°43′41″N 2°45′39″W

Bridport
- Full name: Bridport Football Club
- Nickname: The Bees
- Founded: 1885
- Ground: St Mary's Field, Bridport
- Capacity: 2,000 (180 seated)
- Chairman: Shaun Annetts
- Manager: Chris Herbst
- League: South West Peninsula League Premier Division East
- 2024–25: South West Peninsula League Premier Division East, 3rd of 16
Home colours	Away colours

Bridport Football Club is a football club based in Bridport, Dorset, England. Affiliated to the Dorset County Football Association, they are currently members of the South West Peninsula League Premier Division East and play at St Mary's Field.

== History ==
The club was established on 7 October 1885. In 1896 they became founder members of the Dorset League. However, after finishing bottom of the league in 1897–98 the club left the league. They subsequently returned in 1906–07, but left after finishing bottom again. The club went on to play in the South Dorset and West Dorset leagues, before joining the Perry Street & District League. They were league champions in 1912–13, 1922–23 and 1931–32.

In 1957 Bridport were founder members of the Dorset Combination. They won the League Cup in the league's inaugural season, beating 15th RASC in the final, and retained the trophy the following season, defeating the same opponents. The club were league runners-up in 1959–60, and after finishing as runners-up the following season (also losing in the League Cup final to Dorchester Town reserves), they moved up to the Western League. The club won the league's Challenge Cup in 1970–71 and again in 1972–73. When the Western League gained a second division in 1976, Bridport were placed in the Premier Division. They won the Challenge Cup for a third time in 1977–78, and the Dorset Senior Cup in 1980–81.

Midway through the 1983–84 season Bridport resigned from the Western League, with the reserves (playing in the Dorset Combination) becoming the first team. They were Dorset Combination champions in 1985–86, and after retaining the league title and winning the League Cup for the next two seasons, as well as winning the Dorset Senior Cup in 1987–88, the club were promoted to Division One of the Western League. In 1993–94 they were Division One runners-up, earning promotion to the Premier Division. The club were relegated back to Division One at the end of the 2004–05 season, although they did win the Dorset Senior Cup again. They were promoted to the Premier Division in 2010–11 after finishing third in Division One. In 2021–22 the club finished bottom of Division One with just four points, and were relegated to the Premier Division East of the South West Peninsula League.

== Ground ==
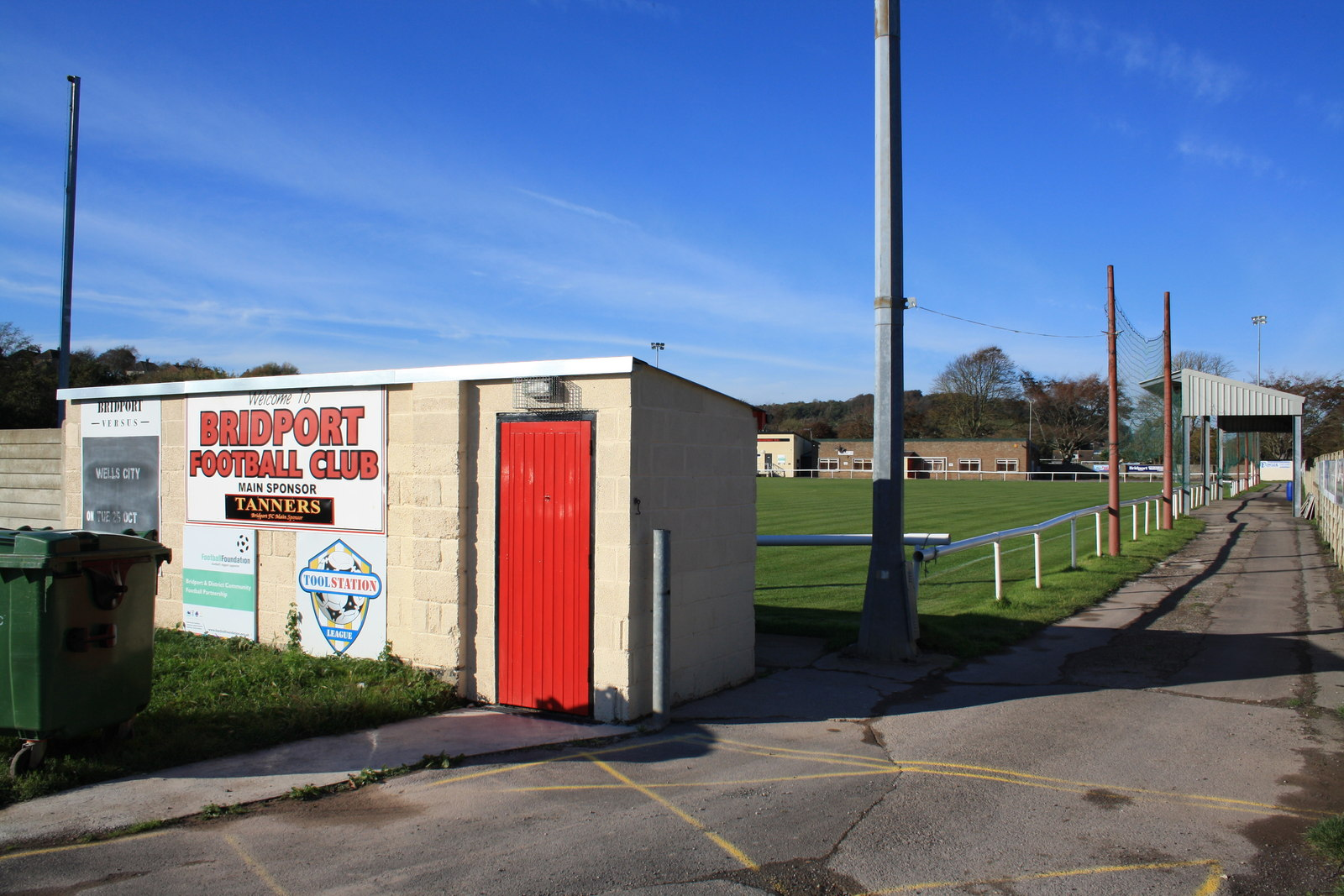
St Mary's Field

After playing at several different grounds, in 1930 the club moved to Crown Field on West Bay Road. They remained at Crown Field until 1953, when the club relocated to St Mary's Field, bringing with them a 200-seat wooden stand which was placed on one side of the pitch. A covered stand was erected on the other side of the pitch during the 1960s. The wooden stand was later replaced with a new 180-seat stand, with the covered stand also replaced with a more modern structure. A clubhouse known as 'the Beehive' is situated behind one goal.

Floodlights were installed in 1990 and inaugurated with a match against Yeovil Town on 8 August, with Bridport winning 4–3.

== Honours ==
- Western League
  - League Cup winners 1970–71, 1972–73, 1977–78
- Dorset Combination
  - Champions 1985–86, 1986–87, 1987–88
  - League Cup winners 1957–58, 1958–59, 1986–87, 1987–88
- Perry Street & District League
  - Champions 1912–13, 1922–23, 1931–32
- Dorset Senior Cup
  - Winners 1963–64, 1969–70, 1970–71, 1974–75, 1976–77, 1977–78, 1979–80, 1980–81, 1987–88, 2004–05

== Records ==
- Best FA Cup performance: Third qualifying round, 1957–58, 2017–18
- Best FA Trophy performance: Third qualifying round, 1971–72
- Best FA Vase performance: Fifth round, 1988–89
- Record attendance: 1,150 vs Exeter City, 1981

== See also ==
- Bridport F.C. players
- Bridport F.C. managers
