= Keynsham Town F.C. =

Association football club in England

Coordinates: 51°25′10″N 2°30′26″W

Keynsham Town
- Full name: Keynsham Town Football Club
- Nickname: The K's
- Founded: 1895
- Ground: Crown Field, Keynsham
- Chairman: Martin Parfrey
- Manager: Chris King
- League: Western League Division One
- 2025–26: Western League Division One, 18th of 20
- Website: keynshamtownfc.co.uk
Home colours	Away colours

Keynsham Town Football Club is a semi-professional football club based in Keynsham, Somerset, England. Affiliated to the Somerset County FA, they are currently members of the Western League Division One and play at Crown Fields.

== History ==
The club was established in 1895. They joined the East Bristol & District League, winning Division Three in 1898–99 to earn promotion to Division Two. After bring promoted to Division One around the turn of the century, the club were relegated to Division Two during the 1930s, before winning the Division Two title in 1949–50 and earning promotion back to Division One. They won the Somerset Senior Cup in 1951–52, and again in 1957–58. In the late 1950s the club joined the Bristol Premier Combination, before moving up to the Somerset County League in 1967.

In 1973 Keynsham joined the Western League. They finished second-from-bottom of the league in 1975–76 and were relegated to the newly formed Division One. However, the club were Division One champions in 1977–78 and were promoted to the Premier Division. In 1979–80 they won the Somerset Professional Cup, defeating Bath City 1–0 on aggregate in the two-legged final. They were relegated back to Division One at the end of the 1982–83 season. The club remained in Division One until the end of the 1996–97 season when they were promoted to the Premier Division as Division One runners-up. However, they were relegated back to Division One two seasons later.

In 2000–01 Keynsham were Division One runners-up, earning promotion to the Premier Division. The club won the Somerset Senior Cup again in 2002–03, but were relegated back to Division One in 2006–07 after finishing bottom of the Premier Division. In 2018–19 they were Division One champions, securing promotion to the Premier Division. They finished bottom of the Premier Division in 2022–23 and were relegated back to Division One.

== Ground ==
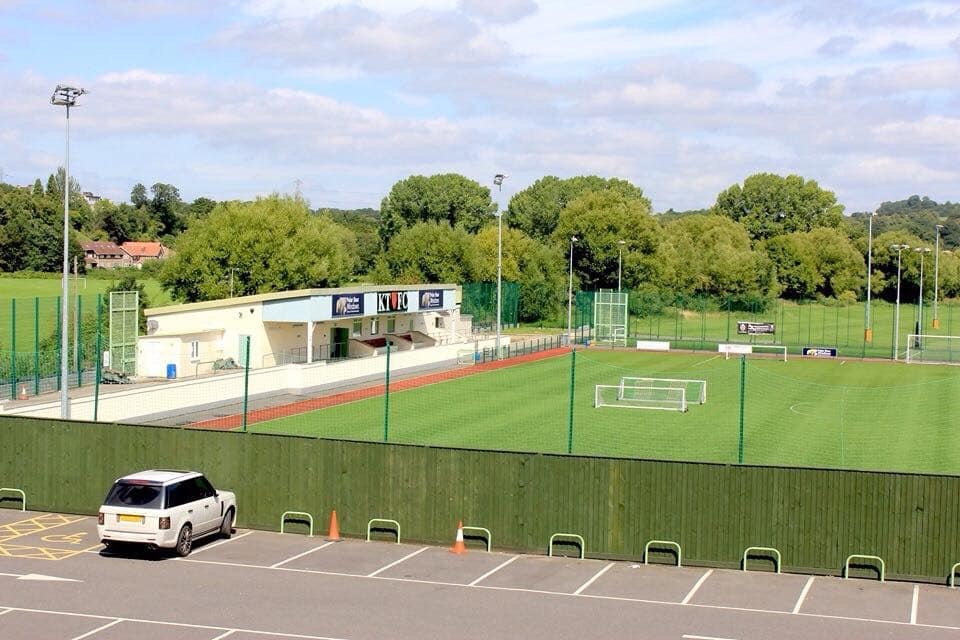
The main stand at Crown Field

The club played at "The Hams" until 1910, when they moved to the Gaston ground. In 1925 they relocated to Park Road, where they remained until a move to Charlton Road in 1930. The club moved to their current Crown Field ground in 1945. A new clubhouse was built in the 1970s, followed by new dressing rooms in 1984; floodlights were erected in 1989. An artificial surface was installed in 2011.

== Honours ==
- Western League
  - Division One champions 1977–78, 2018–19
- Bristol & District League
  - Division Two champions 1948–49
  - Division Three champions 1898–99
- Somerset Professional Cup
  - Winners 1979–80
- Somerset Senior Cup
  - Winners 1951–52, 1957–58, 2002–03

== Records ==
- Best FA Cup performance: Preliminary round, 1990–91, 1991–92, 1994–95, 2003–04
- Best FA Trophy performance: Second qualifying round, 1979–80, 1982–83
- Best FA Vase performance: Fifth round, 2003–04

== See also ==
- Keynsham Town F.C. players
- Keynsham Town L.F.C.
