= Devizes Town F.C. =

Association football club in England

Devizes Town
- Full name: Devizes Town Football Club
- Nickname: The Town
- Founded: 1884
- Ground: Nursteed Road, Devizes
- Capacity: 2,500 (370 seated)
- Chairman: Daniel Sloan & Tom Perkins
- Manager: Chris Allen
- League: Hellenic League Premier Division
- 2025–26: Western League Division One, 1st of 20 (promoted)
- Website: https://devizestownfootball.co.uk/
Home colours	Away colours

Devizes Town F.C. is a football club based in Devizes, Wiltshire, England. They are currently members of the Hellenic League Premier Division and play at Nursteed Road.

== History ==
Devizes Town FC was established in 1884 as Southbroom Football Club, which was formed by the members of Southbroom Cricket Club as a winter activity.

In 1898, Southbroom and other smaller clubs amalgamated to form Devizes Town Football Club. The new club leased a playing field in Quakers Walk and in their first season won the Wiltshire League as well as reaching the first round proper of the FA Amateur Cup and the Wiltshire Cup Final.

After the Second World War the club moved to Nursteed Road, after being offered a free 21-year lease on the ground. In the Wiltshire Senior Cup, the team appeared in every final between 1956/57 and 1962/63 winning six out of the seven finals. In the 1961–62 season, the club achieved a treble by winning the County Senior Cup, Premier League Championship and the League Subsidiary Cup.

In 1965, the club purchased the Nursteed Road ground; and in 1967 joined the Western League. The team had a new manager for that year in Tony Edge, who previously had scored 92 goals in the 1961–62 season, and in 1966 was honoured by the club for achieving the record of 500 goals in 500 games.

In the 1972–73 season, managed by Ken Owens, the club won the Western League Championship and the Subsidiary Cup. They stayed in the top division for a further three years but were then relegated to Division One. For four seasons the club remained in Division One but returned to Western League Premier as Division One Runners-up in 1979–80 under manager Paul Lloyd.

Lloyd resigned in 1984 and the club was relegated to the first division at the end of the 1984–85 season, where they remained for a further 15 seasons. During this period the club faced some hard financial times and had to sell their ground to neighbours Linpac in 1991, in return for a lease securing the ground for 99 years.

The 1999–2000 season under manager Brian Newlands saw the club promoted back to the Western Premier league as Division One title winners. The club stayed in the Premier division until the 2008–09 season and remained in the first division until switching to the Wiltshire League in 2022 and the Hellenic League in 2023.

The 2025–26 season saw the club promoted to the Hellenic League Premier Division as champions.

In the 1980–81 season, they reached the quarter-finals of the FA Vase, losing 3–0 at Whickham, the eventual winners. Devizes Town repeated this feat in 2002–03: this time, the run ended with a 0–3 defeat at home to Maldon Town.

== Ground ==
Devizes Town F.C. play their games at Nursteed Road, Devizes, SN10 3DX.

The ground was officially opened in 1965 by their former player Roger Hunt, who was part of the England 1966 World Cup winning team.

== Honours ==
- Western League Premier Division :
  - Winners: 1972–73
- Western League First Division :
  - Winners: 1999–2000, 2025–26
  - Runners-Up: 1979–80
- Wiltshire Premier League :
  - Winners: 1961–62, 1963–64
- Wiltshire Senior League :
  - Winners: 1895–96, 1889–99, 1935–36, 1948–49, 1951–52, 1953–54
- Wiltshire Senior Cup :
  - Winners (14 Times): 1907–08, 1949–50, 1956–57, 1957–58, 1958–59, 1960–61, 1961–62, 1962–63, 1965–66, 1967–68, 1970–71, 1971–72, 1973–74, 1978–79
- Wiltshire Premier Shield :
  - Winners: 1982–83
- Wiltshire Junior Challenge Cup :
  - Winners: 1953–54, 1964–65
- Western League Subsidiary Cup :
  - Winners: 1961–62, 1972–73
- Western Football League Amateur Trophy:
  - Winners (6): 1968–69, 1969–70, 1970–71, 1971–71, 1972–73, 1973–74
- Western League Merit Cup:
  - Winners: 1974–75
- Wiltshire Premier League Challenge Cup:
  - Winners: 1958–59, 1959–60, 1961–62, 1963–64

== Records ==
- Highest League Position: 1st in Western League Premier Division 1972–73
- F.A Cup best Performance: Fourth qualifying round 1972–73, 2000–01
- F.A. Trophy best performance: Third qualifying round 1974–75
- F.A. Vase best performance: Quarter Finals 1980–81, 2002–03

== Former players ==
1. Players that have played/managed in the football league or any foreign equivalent to this level (i.e. fully professional league).
2. Players with full international caps.
3. Players that hold a club record or have captained the club.
- (England) Roger Hunt
- (England) Mike Ford
- (England) Tony Edge
- Keith Newman, England schoolboy player and captain of Devizes, played over 500 games.

== Former coaches ==
1. Managers/Coaches that have played/managed in the football league or any foreign equivalent to this level (i.e. fully professional league).
2. Managers/Coaches with full international cap s .
- (England) Ray Baverstock
