= Dawlish Town A.F.C. =

Defunct football club

Dawlish Town
- Full name: Dawlish Town Association Football Club
- Nickname: The Seasiders
- Founded: 1889 (as Dawlish Argyle)
- Ground: Sandy Lane, Dawlish
- 2010–11: Western Football League; Premier Division, 6th
Home colours	Away colours

Dawlish Town A.F.C. was a football club based in Dawlish, Devon, England. The club played in the Western League Premier Division. In March 2008, the club entered into a partnership with Newton Abbot to share administrative resources, although the players remained separate. The club competed in local and regional leagues.

In October 2003, Chris Myers took over as manager. Dawlish Town were relegated by the end of the season. They finished fourth the following season, and in 2005/06, they were promoted to First Division Champions. Dawlish Town finished tenth in the Toolstation Western League Premier League during the 2006/07 season. Dawlish Town finished second in the 2007/08 season and won two major cups: the Les Phillips Cup and the Devon St. Luke's Cup. On 8 June manager Chris Myers resigned.

The club reformed in 2016 as AFC Dawlish Town and now plays at the Dawlish Leisure Centre Cage Ground.

== Records ==
- Best FA Cup performance: Preliminary round, 1990–91 (replay), 1991–92, 1992–93, 1993–94, 2002–03, 2003–04, 2004–05, 2004–05, 2005–06, 2006–07, 2007–08, 2009–10 (replay)
- Best FA Trophy performance: Second qualifying round, 1980–81, 1983–84
- Best FA Vase performance: Quarter-finals, 1986–87

== Honours ==
Western League

- Premier Division runner-up– 2007–08
- Amateur Trophy Winners– 1976–77
- Challenge Cup Winners– 1980–81, 1983–84
- Division One Champions– 2005–06
- Division One Runners-up– 1998–99

Exeter & District League

- Premier Division Champions– 1966–67, 1968–69, 1969–70, 1971–72, 1972–73
- Senior Three Champions 2000–2001

Cups

- Devon Senior Cup Winners– 1957–58, 1967–68
- Devon Premier Cup Winners– 1969–70, 1972–73, 1980–81
- St Luke's Bowl 1982–83, 2007–08
- Carlsberg Pub Cup Winners 1995–96
- Les Phillips Cup Winners 2007–08
- FA Vase Quarter Finalists 2009–10

== Former players ==
1. Players that have played/managed in the Football League or any foreign equivalent to this level (i.e. fully professional league).
2. Players with full international caps.
3. Players that hold a club record or have captained the club.

- (England) Paul McCullough
