= List of Salisbury City F.C. seasons =

Salisbury City Football Club was an English football club based in Salisbury, Wiltshire. They were formed in 1947 and played at The Raymond McEnhill Stadium. Salisbury have gained back-to-back promotions in, first to the Conference South in the 2005–06 season by finishing top of the Southern League Premier Division, followed by winning the play-off final in the 2006–07 season to participate in the Conference Premier in 2007–08. They played the 2010–11 season in the Southern League Premier Division after being demoted from the Conference Premier at the end of the 2009–10 season, but won promotion to the Conference South for the 2011–12 season in the first season following their demotion. The club spent two seasons in the Conference South before winning promotion to the Conference Premier via the play-offs in the 2012–13 season.

== Key ==
Top scorer and number of goals scored shown in bold when he was also the top scorer for the division.

Key to league record

- Lvl = Level of the league in the current league system
- S = Numbers of seasons
- Pld = Games played
- W = Games won
- D = Games drawn
- L = Games lost
- GF = Goals for
- GA = Goals against
- GD = Goals difference
- Pts = Points
- Position = Position in the final league table
- Overall position = Overall club position in the English league system

Key to cup records

- Res = Final reached round
- Rec = Final club record in the form of wins-draws-losses
- PR = Premilinary round
- QR1 = Qualifying round 1
- QR2 = Qualifying round 2
- QR3 = Qualifying round 3
- QR4 = Qualifying round 4
- R1 = Round 1
- R2 = Round 2
- R3 = Round 3
- R4 = Round 4
- R5 = Round 5
- R6 = Round 6
- QF = Quarter-finals
- SF = Semi-finals
- RU = Runners-up
- W = Winners
- Average home attendance = for league games only

== Seasons ==
Year	League	Pld	W	D	L	GF	GA	GD	Pts*	Position	Leading league scorer		FA Cup	FA Trophy	Average home attendance (Note: Average home attendance = for league games only)
Year	League	Pld	W	D	L	GF	GA	GD	Pts*	Position	Name	Goals	FA Cup	FA Trophy	Average home attendance
1947-48	Western Football League Division 2	34	29	1	4	145	32	+113	59	**1st of 18** Promoted	Roy Fisher	33	QR1		Data incomplete
1948-49	Western Football League Division 1	34	17	5	12	78	51	+27	39	**6th of 18**	Roy Fisher	24	QR2		Data incomplete
1949-50	Western Football League Division 1	34	14	3	17	64	66	-2	31	**11th of 18**	Roy Fisher	22	QR3		Data incomplete
1950-51	Western Football League Division 1	34	14	7	13	65	55	+10	35	**8th of 18**	Roy Fisher	22	QR4		Data incomplete
1951-52	Western Football League Division 1	34	10	9	15	62	68	-6	29	**12th of 18**	Fred Rolls	9	QR3		Data incomplete
1952-53	Western Football League Division 1	32	11	10	11	60	65	-5	32	**8th of 17**	Roy Fisher	10	QR3		Data incomplete
1953-54	Western Football League Division 1	34	17	6	11	74	60	+14	40	**6th of 18**	Bill Hall	23	QR2		Data incomplete
1954-55	Western Football League Division 1	34	17	8	9	87	52	+35	42	**4th of 18**	Andy Prentice	18	QR1		Data incomplete
1955-56	Western Football League Division 1	32	17	7	8	64	31	+33	41	**5th of 17**	Stan Abbott	24	R1		Data incomplete
1956-57	Western Football League Division 1	36	20	5	11	98	60	+38	45	**3rd of 19**	Andy Prentice	32	QR2		Data incomplete
1957-58	Western Football League Division 1	36	18	11	7	55	30	+25	47	**1st of 19** Champions	Stan Abbott	15	QR1		Data incomplete
1958-59	Western Football League Division 1	36	24	3	9	91	53	+38	51	**2nd of 19**	Derek Purvis	30	QR2		Data incomplete
1959-60	Western Football League Division 1	36	20	7	9	85	43	+42	47	**2nd of 19**	Roy Watts	29	R2		Data incomplete
1960-61	Western Football League Division 1	40	31	4	5	135	42	+93	66	**1st of 21** Champions	Roy Watts	49	QR4		Data incomplete
1961-62	Western Football League	38	27	2	9	105	41	+64	56	**2nd of 20**	Roy Watts	34	QR4		Data incomplete
1962-63	Western Football League	42	21	9	12	89	56	+33	51	**6th of 22**	Roy Watts	27	QR1		Data incomplete
1963-64	Western Football League	42	21	8	13	80	61	+19	50	**6th of 22**	Ian Henderson	23	QR3		Data incomplete
1964-65	Western Football League	42	17	9	16	80	67	+13	43	**10th of 22**	Barry Pierce	16	R1		Data incomplete
1965-66	Western Football League	34	12	8	14	62	57	+5	32	**10th of 18**	John Knight	18	QR3		563
1966-67	Western Football League	40	22	9	9	83	54	+29	53	**4th of 21**	Geoff Hodgkins	26	QR3		Data incomplete
1967-68	Western Football League	40	28	3	9	105	35	+70	59	**2nd of 21**	Geoff Hodgkins	30	R1		708
1968–69	Southern Football League; Division One	42	20	6	16	69	52	+17	46	**8th of 22**	Alan Tyler	23	QR3	-	928
1969–70	Southern Football League; Division One	42	12	14	16	47	53	-6	38	**15th of 22**	Alan Tyler	16	QR4	QR3	734
1970–71	Southern Football League; Division One	38	13	7	18	56	60	-4	33	**14th of 20**	John Stevens	16	QR2	QR3	628
1971–72	Southern Football League; Division One South	30	10	7	13	45	44	+1	27	**11th of 16**	Dave Bennett	15	QR3	QR3	418
1972–73	Southern Football League; Division One South	42	14	10	18	49	60	-11	38	**18th of 22**	Dave Bennett	15	QR3	QR2	453
1973–74	Southern Football League; Division One South	38	10	9	19	40	60	-20	29	**17th of 20**	Alan Smith	10	QR2	QR2	Data incomplete
1974–75	Southern Football League; Division One South	38	9	11	18	45	66	-21	29	**16th of 20**	Paul Christopher	16	QR4	QR1	Data incomplete
1975–76	Southern Football League; Division One South	38	17	11	10	73	53	+20	45	**4th of 20**	Colin Guy	20	QR4	QR1	Data incomplete
1976–77	Southern Football League; Division One South	34	15	11	8	57	39	+18	41	**5th of 18**	Alan Green	18	PR	QR1	Data incomplete
1977–78	Southern Football League; Division One South	38	21	10	7	60	27	+33	52	**3rd of 20**	Paul Christopher & Alan Green	13	QR4	QR2	Data incomplete
1978–79	Southern Football League; Division One South	40	13	10	17	47	51	-4	36	**15th of 21**	Brian Ashton	13	QR2	QR3	Data incomplete
1979–80	Southern Football League; Southern Division	46	10	12	24	47	58	-11	32	**23rd of 24**	Alan Green	12	R1	QR2	Data incomplete
1980–81	Southern Football League; Southern Division	46	14	8	24	57	76	-19	36	**20th of 24**	Alan Green	18	QR1	QR3	Data incomplete
1981–82	Southern Football League; Southern Division	46	16	10	20	64	81	-17	42	**17th of 24**	Ian Thompson	19	QR1	QR1	233
1982–83	Southern Football League; Southern Division	34	14	10	10	58	49	+9	52	**6th of 18**	Ian Thompson	24	QR1	PR	205
1983–84	Southern Football League; Southern Division	38	17	8	13	61	48	+13	59	**9th of 20**	Tommy Paterson	16	QR1	QR3	217
1984–85	Southern Football League; Southern Division	38	19	5	14	55	54	+1	62	**6th of 20**	Kevin Dawtry	10	QR2	QR2	216
1985–86	Southern Football League; Southern Division	40	24	8	8	84	51	+33	80	**2nd of 21**; Promoted	Kevin Dawtry	21	QR1	R1	Data incomplete
1986–87	Southern Football League; Premier Division	42	12	7	23	52	82	-30	43	**19th of 22**; Relegated	Matt Carmichael & Denny Mundee	8	QR2	QR1	245
1987–88	Southern Football League; Southern Division	42	24	11	5	71	33	+38	83	**3rd of 22**	Denny Mundee	20	PR	QR2	Data incomplete
1988–89	Southern Football League; Southern Division	42	20	5	17	79	58	+21	65	**9th of 22**	Ian Chalk	16	QR1	QR3	Data incomplete
1989–90	Southern Football League; Southern Division	42	21	9	12	72	50	+22	72	**5th of 22**	Ian Chalk	21	QR1	QR2	287
1990–91	Southern Football League; Southern Division	40	22	11	7	63	39	+24	77	**3rd of 21**	Jimmy Smith	28	QR3	R1	291
1991–92	Southern Football League; Southern Division	42	13	16	13	67	51	+16	55	**12th of 22**	Jimmy Smith	13	QR4	R1	199
1992–93	Southern Football League; Southern Division	42	27	7	8	87	50	+37	88	**2nd of 22**	Sean Sanders	15	R1	QR3	291
1993–94	Southern Football League; Southern Division	42	26	10	6	90	39	+51	88	**4th of 22**	Paul Odey	31	QR1	QR1	294
1994–95	Southern Football League; Southern Division	42	30	7	5	88	37	+51	97	**1st of 22**; Promoted	Jason Lovell	26	QR4	QR2	395
1995–96	Southern Football League; Premier Division	42	14	10	18	57	69	-12	52	**15th of 22**	Gary Manson	14	QR2	QR2	378
1996–97	Southern Football League; Premier Division	42	15	13	14	57	66	-9	58	**12th of 22**	Robbie Harbut	13	QR2	R2	354
1997–98	Southern Football League; Premier Division	42	12	12	18	53	72	-19	48	**18th of 22**	Ian Chalk	10	QR4	QR3	384
1998–99	Southern Football League; Premier Division	42	16	12	14	56	61	-5	60	**12th of 22**	Adrian Randall	13	R1	R2	518
1999–2000	Southern Football League; Premier Division	42	14	8	20	70	84	-14	50	**16th of 22**	Paul Sales	26	QR4	R2	474
2000–01	Southern Football League; Premier Division	42	17	8	17	64	69	-5	59	**13th of 22**	Paul Sales	18	QR3	R1	470
2001–02	Southern Football League; Premier Division	42	6	8	28	36	87	-51	26	**22nd of 22**; Relegated	Ryan King	15	PR	R1	395
2002–03	Southern Football League; Eastern Division	42	27	8	7	81	42	+39	86**	**4th of 22**	Adam Wallace	16	PR	R1	498
2003–04	Southern Football League; Eastern Division	42	21	11	10	73	45	+28	74	**6th of 22**; Transferred	Matt Tubbs	19	R1	PR	573
2004–05	Isthmian League; Premier Division	42	16	9	17	60	64	−4	57	**12th of 22**; Transferred	Adam Wallace	12	QR4	R1	537
2005–06	Southern Football League; Premier Division	42	30	5	7	83	27	+56	95	**1st of 22**; Promoted	Paul Sales	22	QR3	QF	902
2006–07	Conference; South	42	21	12	9	65	37	+28	75	**2nd of 22**; Promoted via PO	-	-	R2	QF	1,118
2007–08	Conference; National	46	18	14	14	70	60	+10	68	**12th of 24**	Matt Tubbs	18	QR4	R1	1,543
2008–09	Conference; National	46	14	13	19	54	64	−10	55	**16th of 24**	Charlie Griffin	21	QR4	R2	1,179
2009–10	Conference; National	44	21	5	18	58	63	−5	58	**12th of 23**; Demoted†	Matt Tubbs	26	R1	**SF**	1,031
2010–11	Southern Football League; Premier Division	40	23	10	7	82	45	+37	75	**3rd of 21**; Promoted via PO	No data	-	QR4	QF	788
2011–12	Conference; South	42	15	12	15	55	54	+1	57	**10th of 22**	No data	-	**R3**	R2	733
2012–13	Conference; South	42	25	8	9	80	47	+33	82***	**2nd of 22**; Promoted via PO	Jamie White	26	QR3	R1	735
2013–14	Conference; Premier	46	19	10	17	58	63	-5	67	**12th of 24**; Demoted‡	Dan Fitchett	12	R2	R1	1,001

^{*} – 2 points for a win until 1981/82, 3 points for a win from 1982/83.
^{**} – 3 points deducted.
^{***} – 1 point deducted for fielding an ineligible player.
† – demoted 2 divisions down after entering administration.
‡ – demoted from Conference due to financial irregularities.
