= 2004–05 Western Football League =

Western Football League
- Season: 2004–05
- Champions: Bideford (Premier Division); Willand Rovers (Division One)

The 2004–05 season was the 103rd in the history of the Western Football League.

The league champions for the eighth time in their history, and the third time in four seasons, were Bideford. The champions of Division One were Willand Rovers.

== Final tables ==
=== Premier Division ===
The Premier Division was increased from 18 to 20 clubs after Paulton Rovers were promoted to the Southern League, and Dawlish Town and Elmore were relegated to the First Division. Five clubs joined:

- Bitton, runners-up in the First Division.
- Bristol Manor Farm, third in the First Division.
- Clyst Rovers, fourth in the First Division.
- Corsham Town, fifth in the First Division.
- Hallen, champions of the First Division.

| Pos | Team | Pld | W | D | L | GF | GA | GD | Pts | Qualification or relegation |
|---|---|---|---|---|---|---|---|---|---|---|
| 1 | Bideford (C) | 38 | 28 | 4 | 6 | 105 | 26 | +79 | 88 | |
| 2 | Corsham Town | 38 | 25 | 8 | 5 | 79 | 33 | +46 | 83 | |
| 3 | Frome Town | 38 | 23 | 7 | 8 | 78 | 35 | +43 | 76 | |
| 4 | Hallen | 38 | 23 | 6 | 9 | 81 | 38 | +43 | 75 | |
| 5 | Exmouth Town | 38 | 21 | 8 | 9 | 64 | 39 | +25 | 71 | |
| 6 | Bridgwater Town | 38 | 22 | 4 | 12 | 66 | 46 | +20 | 70 | |
| 7 | Bristol Manor Farm | 38 | 17 | 7 | 14 | 56 | 59 | −3 | 58 | |
| 8 | Bitton | 38 | 15 | 12 | 11 | 64 | 66 | −2 | 57 | |
| 9 | Backwell United | 38 | 14 | 13 | 11 | 58 | 46 | +12 | 55 | |
| 10 | Brislington | 38 | 14 | 8 | 16 | 50 | 51 | −1 | 50 | |
| 11 | Keynsham Town | 38 | 14 | 7 | 17 | 39 | 62 | −23 | 49 | |
| 12 | Barnstaple Town | 38 | 15 | 3 | 20 | 51 | 68 | −17 | 48 | |
| 13 | Odd Down | 38 | 12 | 9 | 17 | 47 | 57 | −10 | 45 | |
| 14 | Melksham Town | 38 | 10 | 9 | 19 | 57 | 70 | −13 | 39 | |
| 15 | Devizes Town | 38 | 10 | 8 | 20 | 37 | 63 | −26 | 38 | |
| 16 | Torrington | 38 | 11 | 5 | 22 | 50 | 83 | −33 | 38 | |
| 17 | Welton Rovers | 38 | 8 | 12 | 18 | 59 | 80 | −21 | 36 | |
| 18 | Bishop Sutton | 38 | 9 | 9 | 20 | 44 | 71 | −27 | 36 | |
| 19 | Bridport (R) | 38 | 10 | 4 | 24 | 52 | 75 | −23 | 34 | Relegated to the First Division |
| 20 | Clyst Rovers (R) | 38 | 3 | 9 | 26 | 44 | 113 | −69 | 18 | Relegated to the First Division |

(C) Champions; (R) Relegated

=== First Division ===
The First Division was increased from 19 to 20 clubs after Hallen, Bitton, Bristol Manor Farm, Clyst Rovers and Corsham Town were promoted to the Premier Division and six clubs joined:

- Almondsbury, promoted from the Gloucestershire County League.
- Biddestone, promoted from the Wiltshire League.
- Dawlish Town, relegated from the Premier Division.
- Elmore, relegated from the Premier Division.
- Radstock Town, promoted from the Somerset County League.
- Saltash United, promoted from the South Western League.

| Pos | Team | Pld | W | D | L | GF | GA | GD | Pts | Promotion |
|---|---|---|---|---|---|---|---|---|---|---|
| 1 | Willand Rovers (C, P) | 38 | 27 | 7 | 4 | 88 | 31 | +57 | 88 | Promoted to the Premier Division |
| 2 | Calne Town (P) | 38 | 23 | 10 | 5 | 91 | 30 | +61 | 79 | Promoted to the Premier Division |
| 3 | Radstock Town (P) | 38 | 24 | 7 | 7 | 67 | 38 | +29 | 79 | Promoted to the Premier Division |
| 4 | Dawlish Town | 38 | 20 | 12 | 6 | 81 | 42 | +39 | 72 | |
| 5 | Larkhall Athletic | 38 | 21 | 8 | 9 | 65 | 35 | +30 | 71 | |
| 6 | Shrewton United | 38 | 22 | 3 | 13 | 83 | 56 | +27 | 69 | |
| 7 | Street | 38 | 17 | 12 | 9 | 68 | 46 | +22 | 63 | |
| 8 | Ilfracombe Town | 38 | 16 | 11 | 11 | 72 | 76 | −4 | 59 | |
| 9 | Clevedon United | 38 | 15 | 7 | 16 | 61 | 64 | −3 | 52 | |
| 10 | Elmore | 38 | 14 | 7 | 17 | 59 | 67 | −8 | 49 | |
| 11 | Weston St Johns | 38 | 14 | 7 | 17 | 62 | 88 | −26 | 49 | |
| 12 | Almondsbury | 38 | 11 | 10 | 17 | 55 | 79 | −24 | 43 | |
| 13 | Cadbury Heath | 38 | 10 | 12 | 16 | 46 | 58 | −12 | 42 | |
| 14 | Wellington | 38 | 11 | 9 | 18 | 58 | 76 | −18 | 42 | |
| 15 | Chard Town | 38 | 11 | 8 | 19 | 43 | 63 | −20 | 41 | |
| 16 | Westbury United | 38 | 8 | 14 | 16 | 57 | 75 | −18 | 38 | |
| 17 | Saltash United | 38 | 8 | 11 | 19 | 61 | 77 | −16 | 35 | |
| 18 | Minehead Town | 38 | 8 | 10 | 20 | 41 | 64 | −23 | 34 | |
| 19 | Biddestone | 38 | 3 | 14 | 21 | 40 | 81 | −41 | 23 | |
| 20 | Shepton Mallet | 38 | 3 | 9 | 26 | 38 | 90 | −52 | 18 | |

Rules for classification: The system of using goal difference to separate two teams tied on points was used. The points system: 3 points for a win, 1 point for a draw and 0 points for losing.
(C) Champions; (P) Promoted
