= 2005–06 Western Football League =

Western Football League
- Season: 2005–06
- Champions: Bideford (Premier Division); Dawlish Town (Division One)

The 2005–06 season was the 104th in the history of the Western Football League.

The league champions for the ninth time in their history, and the fourth time in five seasons, were Bideford. The champions of Division One were Dawlish Town.

== Final tables ==
=== Premier Division ===
The Premier Division was increased from 20 to 21 clubs after Bridport and Clyst Rovers were relegated to the First Division. Three clubs joined:

- Calne Town, runners-up in the First Division.
- Radstock Town, third in the First Division.
- Willand Rovers, champions of the First Division.

Pos	Team	Pld	W	D	L	GF	GA	GD	Pts	Qualification or relegation
1	Bideford (C)	38	29	7	2	93	25	+68	94	
2	Corsham Town	38	24	10	4	78	30	+48	82	
3	Bristol Manor Farm	38	24	4	10	86	43	+43	76	
4	Welton Rovers	38	19	12	7	61	39	+22	69	
5	Calne Town	38	19	10	9	70	41	+29	67	
6	Willand Rovers	38	18	11	9	63	42	+21	65	
7	Frome Town	38	18	10	10	61	45	+16	64	
8	Bitton	38	18	9	11	63	41	+22	63	
9	Hallen	38	15	12	11	71	54	+17	57	
10	Brislington	38	15	8	15	55	53	+2	53	
11	Bridgwater Town	38	15	7	16	66	54	+12	52	
12	Radstock Town	38	14	5	19	62	73	−11	47	
13	Barnstaple Town	38	12	9	17	54	62	−8	45	
14	Melksham Town	38	12	8	18	43	68	−25	44	
15	Odd Down	38	11	10	17	34	44	−10	43	
16	Bishop Sutton	38	7	13	18	36	52	−16	34	
17	Keynsham Town	38	5	11	22	34	78	−44	26	
18	Devizes Town	38	7	5	26	27	94	−67	26	
19	Torrington	38	6	7	25	33	89	−56	25	
20	Backwell United (R)	38	3	10	25	30	93	−63	19	Relegated to the First Division
21	Exmouth Town	0	0	0	0	0	0	0	0	Resigned mid-season, record expunged (Note: Exmouth Town resigned from the league in January 2006, and their record was expunged. The club reformed in the Devon and Exeter League.)

(C) Champions; (R) Relegated

=== First Division ===
The First Division was increased from 20 to 22 clubs after Calne Town, Radstock Town and Willand Rovers were promoted to the Premier Division and five clubs joined:

- Bradford Town, promoted from the Wiltshire League.
- Bridport, relegated from the Premier Division.
- Clyst Rovers, relegated from the Premier Division.
- Longwell Green Sports, promoted from the Gloucestershire County League.
- Portishead, promoted from the Somerset County League.

Pos	Team	Pld	W	D	L	GF	GA	GD	Pts	Promotion
1	Dawlish Town (C, P)	42	33	6	3	115	33	+82	105	Promoted to the Premier Division
2	Chard Town (P)	42	29	10	3	87	27	+60	97	Promoted to the Premier Division
3	Street (P)	42	24	11	7	80	39	+41	83	Promoted to the Premier Division
4	Ilfracombe Town	42	23	9	10	82	50	+32	78	
5	Westbury United	42	22	10	10	95	50	+45	76	
6	Bridport	42	22	6	14	81	60	+21	72	
7	Larkhall Athletic	42	19	11	12	93	56	+37	68	
8	Portishead	42	18	12	12	59	49	+10	66	
9	Shrewton United	42	18	7	17	88	79	+9	61	
10	Bradford Town	42	15	13	14	71	81	−10	58	
11	Clevedon United	42	15	12	15	62	67	−5	57	
12	Longwell Green Sports	42	15	9	18	49	52	−3	54	
13	Weston St Johns	42	18	3	21	63	81	−18	54 (Note: Weston St Johns had three points deducted.)	
14	Cadbury Heath	42	15	8	19	70	62	+8	53	
15	Saltash United	42	15	7	20	71	84	−13	52	Left to join the South Western League
16	Biddestone	42	13	11	18	54	59	−5	50	
17	Wellington	42	14	8	20	69	81	−12	50	
18	Almondsbury	42	10	11	21	46	70	−24	41	
19	Minehead Town	42	9	9	24	47	100	−53	36	
20	Shepton Mallet	42	10	4	28	34	85	−51	34	
21	Clyst Rovers	42	7	7	28	47	92	−45	28	
22	Elmore	42	4	4	34	42	148	−106	16	

Rules for classification: The system of using goal difference to separate two teams tied on points was used. The points system: 3 points for a win, 1 point for a draw and 0 points for losing.
(C) Champions; (P) Promoted
