= 2001–02 Western Football League =

Western Football League
- Season: 2001–02
- Champions: Bideford (Premier Division); Frome Town (Division One)

The 2001–02 season was the 100th in the history of the Western Football League.

The league champions for the sixth time in their history were Bideford, but runners-up Taunton Town took promotion to the Southern League. The champions of Division One were Frome Town.

== Final tables ==
=== Premier Division ===
The Premier Division remained at 20 clubs after Chippenham Town were promoted to the Southern League, Minehead Town were relegated to the First Division, and two clubs joined:

- Keynsham Town, runners-up in the First Division.
- Team Bath, champions of the First Division.

Pos	Team	Pld	W	D	L	GF	GA	GD	Pts	Promotion or relegation
1	Bideford (C)	38	28	7	3	105	37	+68	91	
2	Taunton Town (P)	38	26	5	7	104	43	+61	83	Promoted to the Southern League
3	Brislington	38	24	11	3	72	32	+40	83	
4	Team Bath	38	22	7	9	74	36	+38	73	
5	Devizes Town	38	22	4	12	72	51	+21	70	
6	Dawlish Town	38	21	6	11	86	56	+30	69	
7	Paulton Rovers	38	18	11	9	77	54	+23	65	
8	Bridgwater Town	38	17	9	12	53	45	+8	60	
9	Backwell United	38	16	9	13	56	41	+15	57	
10	Melksham Town	38	15	9	14	47	46	+1	54	
11	Odd Down	38	13	11	14	49	45	+4	50	
12	Barnstaple Town	38	12	8	18	57	66	−9	44	
13	Keynsham Town	38	11	9	18	47	71	−24	42	
14	Elmore	38	10	7	21	47	96	−49	37	
15	Bishop Sutton	38	9	8	21	53	89	−36	35	
16	Yeovil Town Reserves	38	10	4	24	57	86	−29	34	Left at the end of the season
17	Bridport	38	9	6	23	51	86	−35	33	
18	Welton Rovers	38	7	9	22	46	67	−21	30	
19	Bristol Manor Farm (R)	38	7	8	23	30	80	−50	29	Relegated to the First Division
20	Westbury United (R)	38	7	4	27	35	91	−56	25	Relegated to the First Division

(C) Champions; (P) Promoted; (R) Relegated

=== First Division ===
The First Division remained at 20 clubs after Team Bath and Keynsham Town were promoted to the Premier Division, Pewsey Vale transferred to the Hellenic League, and three clubs joined:

- Minehead Town, relegated from the Premier Division.
- Shepton Mallet, promoted from the Somerset Senior League.
- Willand Rovers, promoted from the Devon County League.
- Worle St Johns F.C. changed their name to Weston St Johns F.C.

Pos	Team	Pld	W	D	L	GF	GA	GD	Pts	Promotion or relegation
1	Frome Town (C, P)	38	29	5	4	104	22	+82	92	Promoted to the Premier Division
2	Bath City Reserves (P)	38	24	12	2	79	22	+57	81 (Note: Bath City Reserves had three points deducted.)	Promoted to the Premier Division
3	Exmouth Town	38	23	11	4	84	39	+45	80	
4	Torrington	38	23	5	10	87	49	+38	74	
5	Clyst Rovers	38	18	11	9	73	53	+20	65	
6	Bitton	38	18	9	11	66	55	+11	63	
7	Shepton Mallet	38	18	8	12	59	47	+12	62	
8	Street	38	17	10	11	76	58	+18	61	
9	Corsham Town	38	14	13	11	55	48	+7	55	
10	Hallen	38	16	6	16	69	60	+9	54	
11	Chard Town	38	14	8	16	66	59	+7	50	
12	Larkhall Athletic	38	13	8	17	55	71	−16	47	
13	Weston St Johns	38	13	7	18	71	78	−7	46	
14	Ilfracombe Town	38	14	4	20	59	84	−25	46	
15	Willand Rovers	38	9	15	14	59	58	+1	42	
16	Cadbury Heath	38	10	7	21	55	84	−29	37	
17	Wellington	38	9	8	21	48	89	−41	35	
18	Minehead Town	38	9	5	24	52	90	−38	32	
19	Calne Town	38	6	7	25	40	86	−46	25	
20	Warminster Town (R)	38	2	3	33	35	140	−105	9	Relegated to the Wiltshire League

Rules for classification: The system of using goal difference to separate two teams tied on points was used. The points system: 3 points for a win, 1 point for a draw and 0 points for losing.
(C) Champions; (P) Promoted; (R) Relegated
