= 2003–04 Western Football League =

Western Football League
- Season: 2003–04
- Champions: Bideford (Premier Division); Hallen (Division One)

The 2003–04 season was the 102nd in the history of the Western Football League.

The league champions for the seventh time in their history were Bideford, but it was runners-up Paulton Rovers who took promotion to the Southern League. The champions of Division One were Hallen.

== Final tables ==
=== Premier Division ===
The Premier Division remained at 18 clubs after Team Bath were promoted to the Southern League, and Bath City Reserves left the league. Two clubs joined:

- Exmouth Town, runners-up in the First Division.
- Torrington, champions of the First Division.

Pos	Team	Pld	W	D	L	GF	GA	GD	Pts	Promotion or relegation
1	Bideford (C)	34	25	7	2	110	30	+80	82	
2	Paulton Rovers (P)	34	25	2	7	85	28	+57	77	Promoted to the Southern League
3	Frome Town	34	21	5	8	84	43	+41	68	
4	Backwell United	34	20	5	9	67	35	+32	65	
5	Exmouth Town	34	19	7	8	70	34	+36	64	
6	Bridgwater Town	34	19	3	12	67	47	+20	60	
7	Brislington	34	18	4	12	57	40	+17	58	
8	Welton Rovers	34	14	7	13	62	54	+8	49	
9	Odd Down	34	13	10	11	48	44	+4	49	
10	Barnstaple Town	34	12	11	11	47	42	+5	47	
11	Torrington	34	12	10	12	69	74	−5	46	
12	Bridport	34	12	6	16	52	52	0	42	
13	Devizes Town	34	11	2	21	55	69	−14	35	
14	Melksham Town	34	9	6	19	38	61	−23	33	
15	Keynsham Town	34	8	5	21	45	84	−39	29	
16	Bishop Sutton	34	8	4	22	42	77	−35	28	
17	Dawlish Town (R)	34	6	5	23	30	103	−73	23	Relegated to the First Division
18	Elmore (R)	34	4	1	29	26	137	−111	13	Relegated to the First Division

(C) Champions; (P) Promoted; (R) Relegated

=== First Division ===
The First Division remained at 19 clubs after Exmouth Town and Torrington were promoted to the Premier Division and two clubs joined:

- Clevedon United, promoted from the Somerset County League.
- Shrewton United, promoted from the Wiltshire League.

Pos	Team	Pld	W	D	L	GF	GA	GD	Pts	Promotion
1	Hallen (C, P)	36	24	7	5	75	26	+49	79	Promoted to the Premier Division
2	Bitton (P)	36	23	7	6	84	37	+47	76	Promoted to the Premier Division
3	Bristol Manor Farm (P)	36	20	14	2	74	38	+36	74	Promoted to the Premier Division
4	Clyst Rovers (P)	36	21	9	6	74	41	+33	72	Promoted to the Premier Division
5	Corsham Town (P)	36	19	9	8	70	41	+29	66	Promoted to the Premier Division
6	Willand Rovers	36	17	8	11	72	50	+22	59	
7	Shrewton United	36	17	4	15	86	70	+16	55	
8	Larkhall Athletic	36	15	10	11	65	54	+11	55	
9	Calne Town	36	13	10	13	49	45	+4	49	
10	Wellington	36	14	7	15	54	55	−1	49	
11	Westbury United	36	14	6	16	52	56	−4	48	
12	Street	36	11	10	15	54	51	+3	43	
13	Clevedon United	36	11	9	16	60	75	−15	42	
14	Weston St Johns	36	11	9	16	72	95	−23	42	
15	Cadbury Heath	36	9	10	17	50	64	−14	37	
16	Ilfracombe Town	36	7	6	23	43	106	−63	27	
17	Chard Town	36	7	5	24	48	87	−39	26	
18	Shepton Mallet	36	5	9	22	49	82	−33	24	
19	Minehead Town	36	5	9	22	35	93	−58	24	

Rules for classification: The system of using goal difference to separate two teams tied on points was used. The points system: 3 points for a win, 1 point for a draw and 0 points for losing.
(C) Champions; (P) Promoted
