= 1971–72 Western Football League =

Western Football League
- Season: 1971–72
- Champions: Bideford

The 1971–72 season was the 70th in the history of the Western Football League.

The champions for the third time in their history, and the second season in succession, were Bideford.

== Final table ==
The league was reduced from eighteen clubs to fourteen after Andover joined the Southern League, and Bath City Reserves, Bristol City Colts and Plymouth City all left. No new clubs joined.

Pos	Team	Pld	W	D	L	GF	GA	GR	Pts	Qualification
1	Bideford	26	19	4	3	63	21	3.000	42	Joined the Southern League
2	Minehead	26	18	5	3	59	22	2.682	41	Joined the Southern League
3	Glastonbury	26	16	5	5	58	26	2.231	37	
4	Devizes Town	26	11	9	6	44	33	1.333	31	
5	Welton Rovers	26	10	7	9	38	37	1.027	27	
6	Frome Town	26	9	7	10	33	45	0.733	25	
7	Dorchester Town	26	9	6	11	39	38	1.026	24	Joined the Southern League
8	Weston-super-Mare	26	9	5	12	39	45	0.867	23	
9	Bridport	26	9	5	12	32	47	0.681	23	
10	Bridgwater Town	26	7	9	10	28	42	0.667	23	
11	Taunton Town	26	7	7	12	50	54	0.926	21	
12	Torquay United Reserves	26	5	9	12	29	55	0.527	19	
13	Barnstaple Town	26	6	6	14	40	46	0.870	18	
14	St Luke's College	26	3	4	19	25	66	0.379	10	

Rules for classification: The system of using goal average to separate two teams tied on points was used up to and including the 1976–77 season. The points system: 2 points for a win, 1 point for a draw and 0 points for losing.
