= 1968–69 Western Football League =

Western Football League
- Season: 1968–69
- Champions: Taunton Town

The 1968–69 season was the 67th in the history of the Western Football League.

The champions for the first time in their history were Taunton Town.

== League table ==
The league was reduced from 21 to 19 clubs after Salisbury joined the Southern League and Plymouth Argyle Colts left. No new clubs joined.

Pos	Team	Pld	W	D	L	GF	GA	GR	Pts
1	Taunton Town	36	24	5	7	96	53	1.811	53
2	Bideford	36	21	7	8	77	44	1.750	49
3	Bridgwater Town	36	18	12	6	72	30	2.400	48
4	Glastonbury	36	22	4	10	85	49	1.735	48
5	Frome Town	36	18	11	7	57	38	1.500	47
6	Andover	36	16	9	11	63	43	1.465	41
7	Minehead	36	16	9	11	57	43	1.326	41
8	Welton Rovers	36	14	9	13	51	51	1.000	37
9	Dorchester Town	36	15	6	15	63	53	1.189	36
10	Bath City Reserves	36	15	6	15	58	49	1.184	36
11	Barnstaple Town	36	14	7	15	58	67	0.866	35
12	Devizes Town	36	14	7	15	56	77	0.727	35
13	Torquay United Reserves	36	15	3	18	51	60	0.850	33
14	Bristol City Colts	36	13	6	17	64	68	0.941	32
15	Bridport	36	8	11	17	34	54	0.630	27
16	Weston-super-Mare	36	7	11	18	29	54	0.537	25
17	St Luke's College	36	9	5	22	44	74	0.595	23
18	Portland United	36	7	8	21	36	80	0.450	22
19	Yeovil Town Reserves	36	4	8	24	41	105	0.390	16

Rules for classification: The system of using goal average to separate two teams tied on points was used up to and including the 1976–77 season. The points system: 2 points for a win, 1 point for a draw and 0 points for losing.
