= 1970–71 Western Football League =

Western Football League
- Season: 1970–71
- Champions: Bideford

The 1970–71 season was the 69th in the history of the Western Football League.

The champions for the second time in their history were Bideford.

== Final table ==
The league was reduced from twenty clubs to eighteen after Portland United, Weymouth Reserves and Yeovil Town Reserves left, and one new club joined:

- Plymouth City

Pos	Team	Pld	W	D	L	GF	GA	GR	Pts	Qualification
1	Bideford	34	26	4	4	96	39	2.462	56	
2	Andover	34	21	8	5	65	24	2.708	50	Joined the Southern League
3	Bridgwater Town	34	20	9	5	63	38	1.658	49	
4	Glastonbury	34	18	8	8	78	52	1.500	44	
5	Minehead	34	18	5	11	66	40	1.650	41	
6	Taunton Town	34	17	7	10	66	42	1.571	41	
7	Plymouth City	34	17	6	11	67	41	1.634	40	Left at the end of the season
8	Welton Rovers	34	17	6	11	60	56	1.071	40	
9	Dorchester Town	34	16	6	12	58	50	1.160	38	
10	Devizes Town	34	12	11	11	53	50	1.060	35	
11	Barnstaple Town	34	13	7	14	60	61	0.984	33	
12	Bridport	34	11	8	15	43	49	0.878	30	
13	Weston-super-Mare	34	9	6	19	36	73	0.493	24	
14	Torquay United Reserves	34	8	6	20	43	54	0.796	22	
15	Bristol City Colts	34	7	8	19	40	78	0.513	22	Left at the end of the season
16	Frome Town	34	8	3	23	50	91	0.549	19	
17	Bath City Reserves	34	7	5	22	33	77	0.429	19	Left at the end of the season
18	St Luke's College	34	2	5	27	21	83	0.253	9	

Rules for classification: The system of using goal average to separate two teams tied on points was used up to and including the 1976–77 season. The points system: 2 points for a win, 1 point for a draw and 0 points for losing.
