= 1962–63 Western Football League =

Western Football League
- Season: 1962–63
- Champions: Bristol City Reserves

The 1962–63 season was the 61st in the history of the Western Football League.

The champions for the seventh time in their history, and the second time in succession, were Bristol City Reserves. This season marked the last time that a reserve team won the Western League.

== Final table ==
The league was increased from 20 to 22 clubs after two new clubs joined:

- Andover
- Exeter City Reserves, rejoining after leaving the league in 1961.

Pos	Team	Pld	W	D	L	GF	GA	GR	Pts	Qualification
1	Bristol City Reserves	42	31	5	6	120	56	2.143	67	
2	Bideford Town	42	29	7	6	115	51	2.255	65	
3	Minehead	42	25	6	11	102	62	1.645	56	
4	Andover	42	25	5	12	106	59	1.797	55	
5	Bridgwater Town	42	23	8	11	77	48	1.604	54	
6	Salisbury	42	21	9	12	89	56	1.589	51	
7	Portland United	42	23	5	14	80	66	1.212	51	
8	Weymouth Reserves	42	20	5	17	104	78	1.333	45	
9	Yeovil Town Reserves	42	18	9	15	67	72	0.931	45	
10	Barnstaple Town	42	19	6	17	81	75	1.080	44	
11	Dorchester Town	42	17	9	16	92	79	1.165	43	
12	Chippenham Town	42	15	12	15	92	60	1.533	42	
13	Poole Town Reserves	42	17	7	18	82	77	1.065	41	
14	Exeter City Reserves	42	15	10	17	55	74	0.743	40	
15	Bath City Reserves	42	14	6	22	82	96	0.854	34	
16	Weston-super-Mare	42	11	9	22	72	108	0.667	31	
17	Welton Rovers	42	11	8	23	71	107	0.664	30	
18	Glastonbury	42	13	4	25	56	114	0.491	30	
19	Torquay United Reserves	42	10	8	24	48	78	0.615	28	
20	Bridport	42	9	8	25	56	111	0.505	26	
21	Taunton Town	42	11	4	27	56	112	0.500	26	
22	Bristol Rovers Colts	42	6	8	28	56	120	0.467	20	Left at the end of the season

Rules for classification: The system of using goal average to separate two teams tied on points was used up to and including the 1976–77 season. The points system: 2 points for a win, 1 point for a draw and 0 points for losing.
