= 1963–64 Western Football League =

Western Football League
- Season: 1963–64
- Champions: Bideford

The 1963–64 season was the 62nd in the history of the Western Football League.

The champions for the first time in their history were Bideford.

== Final table ==
The league remained at 22 clubs after Bristol Rovers Colts left and one new club joined:

- Frome Town, rejoining after leaving the league in 1960.
- Bideford Town changed their name to Bideford.

| Pos | Team | Pld | W | D | L | GF | GA | GR | Pts |
|---|---|---|---|---|---|---|---|---|---|
| 1 | Bideford | 42 | 30 | 6 | 6 | 113 | 36 | 3.139 | 66 |
| 2 | Bristol City Reserves | 42 | 24 | 15 | 3 | 122 | 43 | 2.837 | 63 |
| 3 | Bridgwater Town | 42 | 25 | 10 | 7 | 82 | 32 | 2.563 | 60 |
| 4 | Welton Rovers | 42 | 24 | 6 | 12 | 84 | 54 | 1.556 | 54 |
| 5 | Dorchester Town | 42 | 19 | 14 | 9 | 94 | 56 | 1.679 | 52 |
| 6 | Salisbury | 42 | 21 | 8 | 13 | 80 | 61 | 1.311 | 50 |
| 7 | Barnstaple Town | 42 | 20 | 9 | 13 | 92 | 69 | 1.333 | 49 |
| 8 | Minehead | 42 | 20 | 8 | 14 | 96 | 85 | 1.129 | 48 |
| 9 | Weymouth Reserves | 42 | 16 | 12 | 14 | 94 | 74 | 1.270 | 44 |
| 10 | Andover | 42 | 17 | 10 | 15 | 89 | 78 | 1.141 | 44 |
| 11 | Torquay United Reserves | 42 | 18 | 7 | 17 | 81 | 73 | 1.110 | 43 |
| 12 | Yeovil Town Reserves | 42 | 17 | 9 | 16 | 73 | 99 | 0.737 | 43 |
| 13 | Chippenham Town | 42 | 15 | 8 | 19 | 75 | 62 | 1.210 | 38 |
| 14 | Bath City Reserves | 42 | 12 | 12 | 18 | 77 | 92 | 0.837 | 36 |
| 15 | Frome Town | 42 | 11 | 11 | 20 | 69 | 97 | 0.711 | 33 |
| 16 | Weston-super-Mare | 42 | 11 | 11 | 20 | 58 | 86 | 0.674 | 33 |
| 17 | Glastonbury | 42 | 11 | 9 | 22 | 70 | 91 | 0.769 | 31 |
| 18 | Exeter City Reserves | 42 | 8 | 15 | 19 | 73 | 100 | 0.730 | 31 |
| 19 | Poole Town Reserves | 42 | 11 | 6 | 25 | 56 | 98 | 0.571 | 28 |
| 20 | Bridport | 42 | 7 | 14 | 21 | 40 | 100 | 0.400 | 28 |
| 21 | Portland United | 42 | 10 | 5 | 27 | 63 | 127 | 0.496 | 25 |
| 22 | Taunton Town | 42 | 8 | 9 | 25 | 37 | 105 | 0.352 | 25 |

Rules for classification: The system of using goal average to separate two teams tied on points was used up to and including the 1976–77 season. The points system: 2 points for a win, 1 point for a draw and 0 points for losing.
