= 1967–68 Western Football League =

Western Football League
- Season: 1967–68
- Champions: Bridgwater Town

The 1967–68 season was the 66th in the history of the Western Football League.

The champions for the first time in their history were Bridgwater Town.

== Final table ==
The league remained at 21 clubs after Exeter City Reserves and Weymouth Reserves left. Two new clubs joined:

- Bath City Reserves, rejoining the league after leaving in 1965.
- Devizes Town

Pos	Team	Pld	W	D	L	GF	GA	GR	Pts	Qualification
1	Bridgwater Town	40	27	8	5	92	41	2.244	62	
2	Salisbury	40	28	3	9	105	35	3.000	59	Joined the Southern League
3	Glastonbury	40	24	7	9	103	64	1.609	55	
4	Bath City Reserves	40	21	9	10	81	63	1.286	51	
5	Frome Town	40	22	6	12	98	72	1.361	50	
6	Minehead	40	18	13	9	72	49	1.469	49	
7	Dorchester Town	40	17	14	9	81	50	1.620	48	
8	Welton Rovers	40	20	6	14	74	55	1.345	46	
9	Plymouth Argyle Colts	40	18	7	15	76	72	1.056	43	Left at the end of the season
10	Bridport	40	18	5	17	68	58	1.172	41	
11	Torquay United Reserves	40	17	7	16	58	55	1.055	41	
12	Andover	40	17	5	18	61	66	0.924	39	
13	Taunton Town	40	11	15	14	76	68	1.118	37	
14	Bideford	40	13	9	18	52	63	0.825	35	
15	St Luke's College	40	12	9	19	60	78	0.769	33	
16	Portland United	40	10	12	18	39	80	0.488	32	
17	Bristol City Colts	40	9	10	21	33	59	0.559	28	
18	Weston-super-Mare	40	9	10	21	40	79	0.506	28	
19	Barnstaple Town	40	8	6	26	48	91	0.527	22	
20	Devizes Town	40	7	7	26	56	113	0.496	21	
21	Yeovil Town Reserves	40	5	10	25	36	98	0.367	20	

Rules for classification: The system of using goal average to separate two teams tied on points was used up to and including the 1976–77 season. The points system: 2 points for a win, 1 point for a draw and 0 points for losing.
