= 1966–67 Western Football League =

Western Football League
- Season: 1966–67
- Champions: Welton Rovers

The 1966–67 season was the 65th in the history of the Western Football League.

The champions for the third time in their history, and the third season in succession, were Welton Rovers.

== Final table ==
The league was increased from 18 clubs to 21 with three new clubs joining:

- Plymouth Argyle Colts
- St Luke's College
- Yeovil Town Reserves, rejoining the league after leaving in 1965.

Pos	Team	Pld	W	D	L	GF	GA	GR	Pts	Qualification
1	Welton Rovers	40	29	7	4	102	37	2.757	65	
2	Minehead	40	25	10	5	98	42	2.333	60	
3	Bridgwater Town	40	25	7	8	93	47	1.979	57	
4	Salisbury	40	22	9	9	83	54	1.537	53	
5	Dorchester Town	40	22	8	10	89	48	1.854	52	
6	Bideford	40	23	6	11	76	47	1.617	52	
7	Glastonbury	40	20	9	11	71	54	1.315	49	
8	Exeter City Reserves	40	17	7	16	54	63	0.857	41	Left at the end of the season
9	Torquay United Reserves	40	15	9	16	66	56	1.179	39	
10	Andover	40	13	13	14	69	60	1.150	39	
11	Portland United	40	15	7	18	61	76	0.803	37	
12	Frome Town	40	17	1	22	60	82	0.732	35	
13	Bristol City Colts	40	13	8	19	63	64	0.984	34	
14	Weston-super-Mare	40	12	9	19	52	69	0.754	33	
15	Taunton Town	40	11	10	19	67	77	0.870	32	
16	Plymouth Argyle Colts	40	12	8	20	66	97	0.680	32	
17	Bridport	40	11	8	21	50	80	0.625	30	
18	Weymouth Reserves	40	12	4	24	39	76	0.513	28	Left at the end of the season
19	St Luke's College	40	10	7	23	61	90	0.678	27	
20	Barnstaple Town	40	8	8	24	50	92	0.543	24	
21	Yeovil Town Reserves	40	8	5	27	52	111	0.468	21	

Rules for classification: The system of using goal average to separate two teams tied on points was used up to and including the 1976–77 season. The points system: 2 points for a win, 1 point for a draw and 0 points for losing.
