= 1978–79 Western Football League =

Western Football League
- Season: 1978–79
- Champions: Frome Town (Premier Division); A.F.C. Bournemouth Reserves (Division One)

The 1978–79 season was the 77th in the history of the Western Football League.

The league champions for the first time in their history were Frome Town. The champions of Division One were newcomers A.F.C. Bournemouth Reserves.

== Premier Division ==
The Premier Division was increased from eighteen clubs to twenty after St Luke's College disbanded, and three clubs joined:

- Clandown, runners-up in the First Division.
- Ilminster Town, third-placed club in the First Division.
- Keynsham Town, champions of the First Division.
- Mangotsfield United were officially known as Mangotsfield PF for this season only, for sponsorship reasons.

=== League table ===
Pos	Team	Pld	W	D	L	GF	GA	GD	Pts	Relegation
1	Frome Town	38	21	12	5	60	29	+31	75	
2	Bideford	38	22	8	8	76	39	+37	74	
3	Saltash United	38	19	10	9	65	39	+26	67	
4	Barnstaple Town	38	18	10	10	65	35	+30	64	
5	Tiverton Town	38	17	9	12	71	60	+11	60	
6	Clandown	38	16	11	11	58	49	+9	59	
7	Weston-super-Mare	38	14	15	9	65	48	+17	57	
8	Falmouth Town	38	15	9	14	51	47	+4	54	
9	Paulton Rovers	38	15	9	14	40	48	−8	54	
10	Bridport	38	13	13	12	54	50	+4	52	
11	Bridgwater Town	38	14	9	15	57	53	+4	51	
12	Keynsham Town	38	13	12	13	47	57	−10	51	
13	Mangotsfield PF	38	15	2	21	53	64	−11	47	
14	Ilminster Town	38	11	12	15	45	55	−10	45	
15	Welton Rovers	38	11	8	19	44	59	−15	41	
16	Exeter City Reserves	38	12	5	21	48	75	−27	41	
17	Clevedon Town	38	11	7	20	50	64	−14	40	
18	Dawlish	38	10	10	18	43	61	−18	40	
19	Shepton Mallet Town (R)	38	10	10	18	48	74	−26	40	Relegated to Division One
20	Glastonbury (R)	38	8	9	21	42	76	−34	33	Relegated to Division One

(R) Relegated

== First Division ==
The First Division remained at nineteen clubs after Clandown, Ilminster Town and Keynsham Town were promoted to the Premier Division. Three new clubs joined:

- A.F.C. Bournemouth Reserves
- Elmore, from the South Western League.
- Wellington

=== League table ===
Pos	Team	Pld	W	D	L	GF	GA	GD	Pts	Promotion
1	A.F.C. Bournemouth Reserves (P)	36	25	6	5	101	41	+60	81 (Note: The tables as published at the time contained errors, hence the totals do not balance in some columns.)	Promoted to the Premier Division
2	Portway Bristol (P)	36	23	5	8	81	43	+38	74	Promoted to the Premier Division
3	Bristol Manor Farm	36	20	5	11	59	47	+12	65	
4	Chippenham Town	36	19	7	10	56	43	+13	64	
5	Torquay United Reserves	36	20	4	12	82	47	+35	62 (Note: Torquay United Reserves had two points deducted for fielding ineligible players.)	
6	Melksham Town	36	18	4	14	58	57	+1	58	
7	Devizes Town	36	16	9	11	71	54	+17	57	
8	Wellington	36	18	3	15	48	46	+2	57	
9	Chard Town	36	15	6	15	57	58	−1	51	
10	Brixham United	36	15	5	16	55	61	−6	50	
11	Elmore	36	15	3	18	48	65	−17	48	
12	Ottery St Mary	36	13	5	18	51	60	−9	43 (Note: Ottery St Mary and Yeovil Town Reserves each had one point deducted for fielding ineligible players.)	
13	Larkhall Athletic	36	12	6	18	52	56	−4	42	
14	Westland-Yeovil	36	11	9	16	43	53	−10	42	
15	Heavitree United	36	12	5	19	39	61	−22	41	
16	Swanage Town & Herston	36	11	6	19	51	60	−9	39	
17	Odd Down	36	10	5	21	38	71	−33	35	
18	Exmouth Town	36	8	9	19	41	73	−32	33	
19	Yeovil Town Reserves	36	5	10	21	30	65	−35	24	

Rules for classification: The system of using goal difference to separate two teams tied on points was used. The points system: 3 points for a win, 1 point for a draw and 0 points for losing.
(P) Promoted
