= 1965–66 Western Football League =

Western Football League
- Season: 1965–66
- Champions: Welton Rovers

The 1965–66 season was the 64th in the history of the Western Football League.

The champions for the second time in their history, and the second season in succession, were Welton Rovers, who completed the season unbeaten.

== Final table ==
The league was reduced from 22 clubs to 18 after Bath City Reserves, Bristol City Reserves, Chippenham Town, Poole Town Reserves and Yeovil Town Reserves all left the league. One new club joined:

- Bristol City Colts, rejoining the league after leaving in 1961.

Pos	Team	Pld	W	D	L	GF	GA	GR	Pts
1	Welton Rovers	34	25	9	0	105	28	3.750	59
2	Portland United	34	23	2	9	75	50	1.500	48
3	Bideford	34	19	8	7	90	49	1.837	46
4	Andover	34	16	8	10	74	57	1.298	40
5	Minehead	34	13	12	9	46	44	1.045	38
6	Frome Town	34	14	9	11	53	53	1.000	37
7	Glastonbury	34	12	11	11	61	46	1.326	35
8	Taunton Town	34	15	5	14	73	69	1.058	35
9	Bridgwater Town	34	12	10	12	63	62	1.016	34
10	Salisbury	34	12	8	14	62	57	1.088	32
11	Torquay United Reserves	34	11	10	13	56	56	1.000	32
12	Exeter City Reserves	34	13	4	17	63	70	0.900	30
13	Weymouth Reserves	34	11	8	15	65	76	0.855	30
14	Weston-super-Mare	34	12	5	17	48	61	0.787	29
15	Bridport	34	12	5	17	57	90	0.633	29
16	Dorchester Town	34	9	5	20	41	79	0.519	23
17	Barnstaple Town	34	7	8	19	35	59	0.593	22
18	Bristol City Colts	34	4	5	25	33	94	0.351	13

Rules for classification: The system of using goal average to separate two teams tied on points was used up to and including the 1976–77 season. The points system: 2 points for a win, 1 point for a draw and 0 points for losing.
