= 1979–80 Western Football League =

Western Football League
- Season: 1979–80
- Champions: Barnstaple Town (Premier Division); Melksham Town (Division One)

The 1979–80 season was the 78th in the history of the Western Football League.

The league champions for the second time in their history were Barnstaple Town. The champions of Division One were Melksham Town.

This season marked a return to the system of two points for a win, after five seasons using the three-point system. The Western League returned to the three-point system after ten seasons, in 1989–90.

== Premier Division ==
The Premier Division remained at twenty clubs after Glastonbury and Shepton Mallet Town were relegated to the First Division, and two clubs joined:

- A.F.C. Bournemouth Reserves, champions of the First Division.
- Portway Bristol, runners-up in the First Division.

=== League table ===
Pos	Team	Pld	W	D	L	GF	GA	GD	Pts	Relegation
1	Barnstaple Town	38	23	10	5	67	31	+36	56	
2	A.F.C. Bournemouth Reserves	38	24	7	7	100	26	+74	55	Left at the end of the season
3	Weston-super-Mare	38	22	11	5	81	45	+36	55	
4	Frome Town	38	19	10	9	57	38	+19	48	
5	Bridgwater Town	38	17	12	9	64	43	+21	46	
6	Exeter City Reserves	38	16	11	11	71	59	+12	43	Left at the end of the season
7	Clevedon Town	38	16	10	12	74	58	+16	42	
8	Portway Bristol	38	16	10	12	66	53	+13	42	
9	Saltash United	38	14	14	10	64	51	+13	42	
10	Bideford	38	16	10	12	61	51	+10	42	
11	Keynsham Town	38	16	10	12	56	53	+3	42	
12	Falmouth Town	38	14	10	14	58	53	+5	38	
13	Dawlish	38	10	11	17	39	67	−28	31	
14	Clandown	38	12	6	20	53	76	−23	30	
15	Tiverton Town	38	8	14	16	36	65	−29	30	
16	Welton Rovers	38	10	9	19	59	84	−25	29	
17	Paulton Rovers	38	11	6	21	50	68	−18	28	
18	Mangotsfield United	38	7	10	21	37	80	−43	24	
19	Bridport	38	4	14	20	31	67	−36	21 (Note: Bridport had one point deducted for fielding an ineligible player.)	
20	Ilminster Town (R)	38	2	11	25	31	87	−56	15	Relegated to Division One

(R) Relegated

== First Division ==
The First Division increased from nineteen to twenty-two clubs after A.F.C. Bournemouth Reserves and Portway Bristol were promoted to the Premier Division. Five new clubs joined:

- Bath City Reserves, returning to the league after leaving in 1971.
- Glastonbury, relegated from the Premier Division.
- Liskeard Athletic, from the South Western League.
- Radstock Town, from the Somerset Senior League – returning to the league after leaving in 1960.
- Shepton Mallet Town, relegated from the Premier Division.

=== League table ===
Pos	Team	Pld	W	D	L	GF	GA	GD	Pts	Promotion
1	Melksham Town (P)	42	27	8	7	78	27	+51	62	Promoted to the Premier Division
2	Devizes Town (P)	42	25	9	8	91	42	+49	59	Promoted to the Premier Division
3	Liskeard Athletic (P)	42	23	10	9	70	31	+39	56	Promoted to the Premier Division
4	Bath City Reserves	42	22	8	12	89	62	+27	52	
5	Exmouth Town	42	22	8	12	67	43	+24	52	
6	Torquay United Reserves	42	21	10	11	84	61	+23	52	
7	Elmore	42	20	9	13	63	45	+18	49	
8	Bristol Manor Farm	42	20	9	13	70	58	+12	49	
9	Ottery St Mary	42	16	12	14	64	52	+12	44	
10	Glastonbury	42	16	11	15	60	68	−8	43	
11	Chippenham Town	42	16	10	16	58	62	−4	42	
12	Radstock Town	42	15	10	17	63	75	−12	40	
13	Shepton Mallet Town	42	15	9	18	75	78	−3	39	
14	Chard Town	42	14	11	17	51	59	−8	39	
15	Yeovil Town Reserves	42	14	10	18	71	85	−14	38	
16	Brixham United	42	14	9	19	60	70	−10	37	
17	Heavitree United	42	11	14	17	57	69	−12	36	
18	Larkhall Athletic	42	11	10	21	48	85	−37	32	
19	Odd Down	42	9	12	21	46	76	−30	30	
20	Wellington	42	8	13	21	38	59	−21	29	
21	Swanage Town & Herston	42	6	13	23	45	91	−46	24 (Note: Swanage Town & Herston had one point deducted for fielding an ineligible player.)	
22	Westland-Yeovil	42	5	9	28	31	81	−50	19	Left at the end of the season

Rules for classification: The system of using goal difference to separate two teams tied on points was used. The points system: 2 points for a win, 1 point for a draw and 0 points for losing.
(P) Promoted
