= 1964–65 Western Football League =

Western Football League
- Season: 1964–65
- Champions: Welton Rovers

The 1964–65 season was the 63rd in the history of the Western Football League.

The champions for the first time in their history were Welton Rovers.

== Final table ==
The league remained at 22 clubs with no clubs leaving or joining the league.

Pos	Team	Pld	W	D	L	GF	GA	GR	Pts	Qualification
1	Welton Rovers	42	35	3	4	148	36	4.111	73	
2	Bideford	42	32	6	4	120	29	4.138	70	
3	Minehead	42	27	7	8	88	42	2.095	61	
4	Dorchester Town	42	26	4	12	89	53	1.679	56	
5	Weston-super-Mare	42	22	9	11	89	58	1.534	53	
6	Weymouth Reserves	42	24	4	14	96	46	2.087	52	
7	Bridgwater Town	42	20	9	13	74	59	1.254	49	
8	Torquay United Reserves	42	21	5	16	74	59	1.254	47	
9	Bristol City Reserves	42	21	4	17	96	82	1.171	46	Left at the end of the season
10	Salisbury	42	17	9	16	80	67	1.194	43	
11	Frome Town	42	17	8	17	66	71	0.930	42	
12	Exeter City Reserves	42	18	5	19	92	84	1.095	41	
13	Chippenham Town	42	16	8	18	75	82	0.915	40	Left at the end of the season
14	Glastonbury	42	15	6	21	69	109	0.633	36	
15	Yeovil Town Reserves	42	15	5	22	65	99	0.657	35	Left at the end of the season
16	Andover	42	13	8	21	74	66	1.121	34	
17	Bath City Reserves	42	12	6	24	54	98	0.551	30	Left at the end of the season
18	Bridport	42	11	7	24	60	99	0.606	29	
19	Taunton Town	42	10	8	24	54	104	0.519	28	
20	Barnstaple Town	42	11	5	26	51	89	0.573	27	
21	Portland United	42	6	8	28	40	122	0.328	20	
22	Poole Town Reserves	42	5	2	35	49	149	0.329	12	Left at the end of the season

Rules for classification: The system of using goal average to separate two teams tied on points was used up to and including the 1976–77 season. The points system: 2 points for a win, 1 point for a draw and 0 points for losing.
