= 1977–78 Western Football League =

Western Football League
- Season: 1977–78
- Champions: Falmouth Town (Premier Division); Keynsham Town (Division One)

The 1977–78 season was the 76th in the history of the Western Football League.

The league champions for the fourth time in their history, and the fourth season in succession, were Falmouth Town. They became the first club to win the Western League four times in a row. The champions of Division One were Keynsham Town.

This season was the first in which goal difference decided places for teams which were level on points.

== Final tables ==
=== Premier Division ===
The Premier Division remained at eighteen clubs after Taunton Town left to join the Southern League, and Westland-Yeovil were relegated to the First Division. Two clubs joined:

- Saltash United, champions of the First Division.
- Shepton Mallet Town, runners-up in the First Division.
- Clevedon changed their name to Clevedon Town.

Pos	Team	Pld	W	D	L	GF	GA	GD	Pts	Qualification
1	Falmouth Town	34	26	5	3	98	30	+68	83	
2	Bideford	34	25	8	1	86	25	+61	83	
3	Barnstaple Town	34	18	10	6	75	37	+38	64	
4	Saltash United	34	17	7	10	66	53	+13	58	
5	Bridport	34	14	13	7	44	21	+23	55	
6	Clevedon Town	34	16	9	9	62	41	+21	55 (Note: Clevedon Town had two points deducted for fielding an ineligible player.)	
7	Frome Town	34	14	8	12	43	39	+4	50	
8	Paulton Rovers	34	15	5	14	55	52	+3	50	
9	Weston-super-Mare	34	14	8	12	44	48	−4	50	
10	Exeter City Reserves	34	11	13	10	48	41	+7	46	
11	Bridgwater Town	34	12	9	13	53	56	−3	45	
12	Tiverton Town	34	8	10	16	47	61	−14	34	
13	Shepton Mallet Town	34	9	6	19	52	93	−41	33	
14	Glastonbury	34	9	5	20	46	77	−31	32	
15	Mangotsfield United	34	7	10	17	50	75	−25	31	
16	Welton Rovers	34	8	6	20	34	68	−34	30	
17	Dawlish	34	6	10	18	39	67	−28	28	
18	St Luke's College	34	1	10	23	20	78	−58	13	Disbanded at the end of the season

=== First Division ===
The First Division was increased from eighteen to nineteen clubs, after Saltash United and Shepton Mallet Town were promoted to the Premier Division. Three clubs joined:

- Bristol Manor Farm, from the Somerset Senior League.
- Odd Down
- Westland-Yeovil, relegated from the Premier Division.

Pos	Team	Pld	W	D	L	GF	GA	GD	Pts	Promotion
1	Keynsham Town (P)	36	23	10	3	77	22	+55	79	Promoted to the Premier Division
2	Clandown (P)	36	22	4	10	77	36	+41	70	Promoted to the Premier Division
3	Ilminster Town (P)	36	21	6	9	69	47	+22	69	Promoted to the Premier Division
4	Bristol Manor Farm	36	20	5	11	67	38	+29	65	
5	Devizes Town	36	20	5	11	73	52	+21	65	
6	Torquay United Reserves	36	18	5	13	69	53	+16	59	
7	Portway Bristol	36	17	8	11	57	42	+15	59	
8	Melksham Town	36	17	7	12	76	60	+16	58	
9	Ottery St Mary	36	17	6	13	55	55	0	57	
10	Larkhall Athletic	36	15	8	13	58	66	−8	53	
11	Exmouth Town	36	13	7	16	41	55	−14	46	
12	Brixham United	36	11	9	16	62	79	−17	41 (Note: Brixham United had one point deducted for fielding an ineligible player.)	
13	Chard Town	36	12	5	19	56	81	−25	41	
14	Westland-Yeovil	36	8	12	16	40	52	−12	36	
15	Odd Down	36	9	9	18	52	75	−23	36	
16	Yeovil Town Reserves	36	9	8	19	52	65	−13	35	
17	Heavitree United	36	9	5	22	32	64	−32	32	
18	Swanage Town & Herston	36	6	11	19	48	85	−37	29	
19	Chippenham Town	36	8	4	24	40	74	−34	28	

Source: The system of using goal difference to separate two teams tied on points was used for the first time this season. The points system: 3 points for a win, 1 point for a draw and 0 points for losing.
(P) Promoted
