= Brian Bevan (footballer) =

English footballer

Personal information
- Date of birth: 20 March 1937 (age 89)
- Place of birth: Bristol, England
- Position: Left winger

Senior career*
Years	Team	Apps	(Gls)
- Bridgwater Town
1957–1959	Bristol City	2	(0)
1959–1960	Carlisle United	27	(2)
1960–1961	Millwall	3	(0)
1961–1963	Weymouth	?	(?)
Total		32	(2)
- * Club domestic league appearances and goals

Brian Bevan (born 20 March 1937) is an English former professional footballer who played as a left winger in the Football League. He was born in Bristol.
