= 1961–62 Western Football League =

Western Football League
- Season: 1961–62
- Champions: Bristol City Reserves

The 1961–62 season was the 60th in the history of the Western Football League.

The champions for the sixth time in their history were the returning Bristol City Reserves.

== Final table ==
The league was reduced from 21 to 20 clubs after Bristol City Colts, Exeter City Reserves and Trowbridge Town Reserves left. Two new clubs joined:

- Bridport
- Bristol City Reserves, rejoining after leaving the league in 1948.

Pos	Team	Pld	W	D	L	GF	GA	GR	Pts
1	Bristol City Reserves	38	28	7	3	132	36	3.667	63
2	Salisbury	38	27	2	9	105	41	2.561	56
3	Bideford Town	38	21	11	6	84	49	1.714	53
4	Torquay United Reserves	38	20	5	13	95	78	1.218	45
5	Poole Town Reserves	38	19	5	14	115	85	1.353	43
6	Dorchester Town	38	19	5	14	102	85	1.200	43
7	Bridgwater Town	38	17	8	13	89	69	1.290	42
8	Minehead	38	17	8	13	80	68	1.176	42
9	Chippenham Town	38	17	6	15	79	71	1.113	40
10	Portland United	38	16	8	14	92	85	1.082	40
11	Weston-super-Mare	38	14	11	13	63	68	0.926	39
12	Weymouth Reserves	38	16	6	16	85	71	1.197	38
13	Bath City Reserves	38	13	9	16	74	80	0.925	35
14	Bridport	38	11	8	19	72	93	0.774	30
15	Yeovil Town Reserves	38	13	3	22	74	99	0.747	29
16	Welton Rovers	38	11	7	20	61	104	0.587	29
17	Taunton Town	38	11	4	23	59	114	0.518	26
18	Bristol Rovers Colts	38	6	13	19	59	93	0.634	25
19	Barnstaple Town	38	8	7	23	52	120	0.433	23
20	Glastonbury	38	7	5	26	44	107	0.411	19

Rules for classification: The system of using goal average to separate two teams tied on points was used up to and including the 1976–77 season. The points system: 2 points for a win, 1 point for a draw and 0 points for losing.
