= 1960–61 Western Football League =

Western Football League
- Season: 1960–61
- Champions: Salisbury

The 1960–61 season was the 59th in the history of the Western Football League.

The champions for the second time in their history were Salisbury. This season was the first to feature a single division since 1945–46, with many clubs having left the league at the end of the 1959–60 season.

== Final table ==
The new single division consisted of 21 clubs after Division Two was scrapped. Bridgwater Town Reserves, Chippenham United, Clandown, Dorchester Town Reserves, Frome Town, Gloucester City Reserves, Paulton Rovers, Peasedown Miners Welfare, Radstock Town, Stonehouse, Street, Taunton Town Reserves and Wells City all left the league. One new club joined:

- Exeter City Reserves, rejoining after leaving the league in 1935.

Pos	Team	Pld	W	D	L	GF	GA	GR	Pts	Qualification
1	Salisbury	40	31	4	5	135	42	3.214	66	
2	Dorchester Town	40	26	6	8	115	63	1.825	58	
3	Minehead	40	24	8	8	100	62	1.613	56	
4	Torquay United Reserves	40	23	6	11	122	70	1.743	52	
5	Bridgwater Town	40	18	12	10	88	71	1.239	48	
6	Exeter City Reserves	40	21	5	14	99	68	1.456	47	Left at the end of the season
7	Weymouth Reserves	40	19	9	12	91	79	1.152	47	
8	Bristol City Colts	40	18	10	12	94	70	1.343	46	Left at the end of the season
9	Welton Rovers	40	20	5	15	119	110	1.082	45	
10	Portland United	40	16	10	14	93	87	1.069	42	
11	Yeovil Town Reserves	40	18	5	17	73	73	1.000	41	
12	Chippenham Town	40	18	5	17	79	81	0.975	41	
13	Bristol Rovers Colts	40	12	12	16	80	74	1.081	36	
14	Bath City Reserves	40	11	11	18	75	79	0.949	33	
15	Weston-super-Mare	40	13	7	20	76	98	0.776	33	
16	Bideford Town	40	12	9	19	75	99	0.758	33	
17	Glastonbury	40	13	4	23	66	114	0.579	30	
18	Poole Town Reserves	40	8	9	23	57	87	0.655	25	
19	Trowbridge Town Reserves	40	9	7	24	62	122	0.508	25	Left at the end of the season
20	Barnstaple Town	40	8	4	28	55	111	0.495	20	
21	Taunton Town	40	5	6	29	59	153	0.386	16	

Rules for classification: The system of using goal average to separate two teams tied on points was used up to and including the 1976–77 season. The points system: 2 points for a win, 1 point for a draw and 0 points for losing.
