= 1980–81 Western Football League =

Season of the Western Football League

Western Football League
- Season: 1980–81
- Champions: Bridgwater Town (Premier Division); Chippenham Town (Division One)

The 1980–81 season was the 79th in the history of the Western Football League.

The league champions for the second time in their history were Bridgwater Town. The champions of Division One were Chippenham Town.

== Premier Division ==
The Premier Division remained at twenty clubs after Ilminster Town were relegated to the First Division, and A.F.C. Bournemouth Reserves and Exeter City Reserves left the league. Three clubs joined:

- Devizes Town, runners-up in the First Division.
- Liskeard Athletic, third-placed club in the First Division.
- Melksham Town, champions of the First Division.
- Dawlish changed their name to Dawlish Town.

=== League table ===
Pos	Team	Pld	W	D	L	GF	GA	GD	Pts	Relegation
1	Bridgwater Town	38	25	6	7	54	25	+29	56	
2	Barnstaple Town	38	22	6	10	58	40	+18	50	
3	Frome Town	38	21	6	11	74	51	+23	48	
4	Falmouth Town	38	18	9	11	71	53	+18	45	
5	Bideford	38	18	8	12	58	42	+16	44	
6	Saltash United	38	17	9	12	73	47	+26	43	
7	Portway Bristol	38	16	11	11	55	45	+10	43	
8	Clevedon Town	38	15	11	12	65	52	+13	41	
9	Clandown	38	16	9	13	60	53	+7	41	
10	Devizes Town	38	14	13	11	61	56	+5	41	
11	Bridport	38	12	15	11	56	52	+4	39	
12	Keynsham Town	38	12	15	11	33	34	−1	39	
13	Melksham Town	38	13	11	14	45	49	−4	37	
14	Liskeard Athletic	38	11	11	16	58	70	−12	33	
15	Mangotsfield United	38	8	15	15	43	66	−23	31	
16	Dawlish Town	38	7	16	15	40	50	−10	30	
17	Welton Rovers	38	9	11	18	50	69	−19	29	
18	Weston-super-Mare	38	11	7	20	42	61	−19	29	
19	Paulton Rovers (R)	38	9	11	18	45	72	−27	29	Relegated to Division One
20	Tiverton Town (R)	38	1	10	27	23	77	−54	12	Relegated to Division One

(R) Relegated

== First Division ==
The First Division was reduced from twenty-two to nineteen clubs after Westland-Yeovil left the league, and Devizes Town, Liskeard Athletic and Melksham Town were promoted to the Premier Division. One new club joined:

- Ilminster Town, relegated from the Premier Division.

=== League table ===
Pos	Team	Pld	W	D	L	GF	GA	GD	Pts	Promotion
1	Chippenham Town (P)	36	25	8	3	76	24	+52	58	Promoted to the Premier Division
2	Wellington (P)	36	22	8	6	80	36	+44	52	Promoted to the Premier Division
3	Exmouth Town	36	22	7	7	74	37	+37	51	
4	Bath City Reserves	36	19	11	6	79	44	+35	49	
5	Odd Down	36	20	8	8	59	41	+18	47 (Note: Odd Down had one point deducted for fielding an ineligible player.)	
6	Yeovil Town Reserves	36	18	9	9	58	38	+20	45	
7	Torquay United Reserves	36	16	11	9	60	35	+25	43	
8	Swanage Town & Herston	36	13	11	12	58	55	+3	37	
9	Chard Town	36	11	14	11	42	38	+4	36	
10	Bristol Manor Farm	36	14	8	14	53	57	−4	36	
11	Shepton Mallet Town	36	13	8	15	68	75	−7	34	
12	Elmore	36	12	10	14	44	53	−9	34	
13	Glastonbury	36	9	10	17	44	60	−16	28	
14	Brixham United	36	11	5	20	50	70	−20	27	Left at the end of the season
15	Larkhall Athletic	36	5	12	19	44	76	−32	22	
16	Ottery St Mary	36	7	8	21	37	77	−40	22	
17	Heavitree United	36	7	8	21	40	86	−46	22	
18	Ilminster Town	36	7	6	23	39	70	−31	20	
19	Radstock Town	36	8	4	24	47	80	−33	20	

Rules for classification: The system of using goal difference to separate two teams tied on points was used. The points system: 2 points for a win, 1 point for a draw and 0 points for losing.
(P) Promoted
