= 1981–82 Western Football League =

Western Football League
- Season: 1981–82
- Champions: Bideford (Premier Division); Shepton Mallet Town (Division One)

The 1981–82 season was the 80th in the history of the Western Football League.

The league champions for the fourth time in their history were Bideford. The champions of Division One were Shepton Mallet Town.

== Premier Division ==
The Premier Division remained at twenty clubs after Paulton Rovers and Tiverton Town were relegated to the First Division, and two clubs joined:

- Chippenham Town, champions of the First Division.
- Wellington, runners-up in the First Division.

=== League table ===
Pos	Team	Pld	W	D	L	GF	GA	GD	Pts	Relegation
1	Bideford (C)	38	26	10	2	88	20	+68	62	
2	Barnstaple Town	38	26	8	4	78	31	+47	59 (Note: Barnstaple Town and Clevedon Town each had one point deducted for fielding ineligible players.)	
3	Bridgwater Town	38	16	16	6	70	46	+24	48	Joined the Southern League
4	Clandown	38	17	12	9	49	37	+12	46	
5	Melksham Town	38	17	11	10	58	50	+8	45	
6	Frome Town	38	16	9	13	67	58	+9	41	
7	Weston-super-Mare	38	15	11	12	47	42	+5	41	
8	Saltash United	38	15	7	16	47	53	−6	37	
9	Devizes Town	38	14	7	17	53	60	−7	35	
10	Dawlish Town	38	11	13	14	45	53	−8	35	
11	Liskeard Athletic	38	11	12	15	39	48	−9	34	
12	Bridport	38	12	10	16	43	54	−11	34	
13	Clevedon Town	38	11	12	15	58	60	−2	33	
14	Chippenham Town	38	12	9	17	33	39	−6	33	
15	Falmouth Town	38	12	9	17	46	55	−9	33	
16	Portway Bristol	38	9	13	16	40	47	−7	31	
17	Wellington	38	10	11	17	50	62	−12	31	
18	Keynsham Town	38	9	13	16	39	55	−16	31	
19	Mangotsfield United (R)	38	11	6	21	30	59	−29	28	Relegated to Division One
20	Welton Rovers (R)	38	7	7	24	37	88	−51	21	Relegated to Division One

(C) Champions; (R) Relegated

== First Division ==
The First Division remained at nineteen clubs after Brixham United left the league, and Chippenham Town and Wellington were promoted to the Premier Division. Three new clubs joined:

- Paulton Rovers, relegated from the Premier Division.
- Tiverton Town, relegated from the Premier Division.
- Wimborne Town, from the Dorset County League.

=== League table ===
Pos	Team	Pld	W	D	L	GF	GA	GD	Pts	Promotion or relegation
1	Shepton Mallet Town (C, P)	36	25	8	3	88	30	+58	58	Promoted to the Premier Division
2	Exmouth Town (P)	36	24	8	4	74	31	+43	56	Promoted to the Premier Division
3	Swanage Town & Herston	36	21	5	10	90	47	+43	47	
4	Wimborne Town	36	19	9	8	67	35	+32	47	
5	Bath City Reserves	36	19	6	11	72	46	+26	44	
6	Elmore	36	19	6	11	58	45	+13	44	
7	Paulton Rovers	36	17	6	13	54	48	+6	40	
8	Bristol Manor Farm	36	15	9	12	58	50	+8	39	
9	Torquay United Reserves	36	15	9	12	50	44	+6	39	Left at the end of the season
10	Tiverton Town	36	13	8	15	62	63	−1	34	
11	Chard Town	36	12	10	14	43	55	−12	34	
12	Odd Down	36	14	5	17	51	57	−6	33	
13	Radstock Town	36	10	11	15	44	67	−23	31	
14	Glastonbury	36	12	6	18	63	69	−6	30	
15	Heavitree United	36	11	7	18	39	69	−30	29	
16	Yeovil Town Reserves	36	10	8	18	40	53	−13	28	
17	Larkhall Athletic	36	10	5	21	42	85	−43	25	
18	Ottery St Mary	36	6	3	27	28	79	−51	15	
19	Ilminster Town	36	3	5	28	20	70	−50	11	Left at the end of the season

Rules for classification: The system of using goal difference to separate two teams tied on points was used. The points system: 2 points for a win, 1 point for a draw and 0 points for losing.
(C) Champions; (P) Promoted
