= The Sports Ground (Bideford) =

Football stadium in Bideford, England

The Sports Ground, Bideford
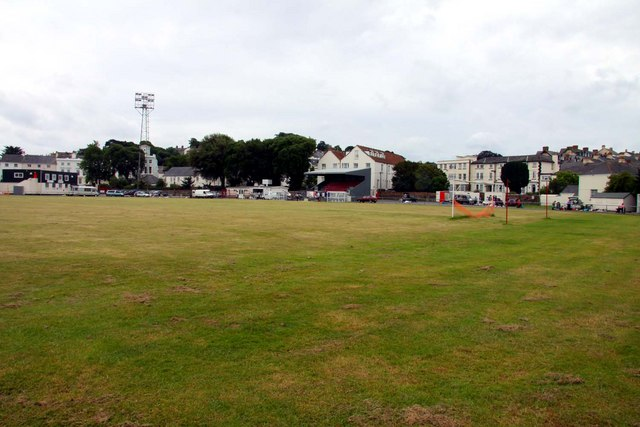
- Location: Kingsley Road, Bideford, Devon
- Coordinates: 51°01′19″N 4°12′31″W
- Capacity: 6,000 (375 seated)

Tenants
- Bideford A.F.C.

The Sports Ground (known as The Persimmon Homes Sports Ground for sponsorship reasons) is a football stadium used by Bideford A.F.C. on Kingsley Road in Bideford, Devon.

== Origins ==
The Sports Ground was constructed on the west side of Kingsley Road and the east side of Mignonette Walk as it was called at the time. There were tennis courts on the north side and a bowling green and putting green on the south side.

== Greyhound racing ==
Greyhound racing took place around the pitch following the construction of a track in 1987. Race night was a Thursday evening and race distances consisted of 420 and 700 metres. It was an all-grass surface with an 'Outside Sumner' hare system. There were kennels for 30 greyhounds and a totalisator on site and the track circumference was 370 metres, which was described as having tight bends. The venture was short-lived, with the racing ending in 1988. The greyhound racing was independent (not affiliated with the sports governing body the National Greyhound Racing Club). It was known as a flapping track, which was the nickname for independent tracks.
