= Alan Green (footballer, born 1951) =

English footballer

Personal information
- Full name: Alan Peter Charles Green
- Date of birth: 19 April 1951 (age 75)
- Place of birth: Fordingbridge, England
- Position: Forward

Senior career*
Years	Team	Apps	(Gls)
1970–1972	AFC Bournemouth	0	(0)
1972–1973	Mansfield Town	1	(0)
1974–1978	Salisbury		(58)
1978–1979	Andover		
1979–1981	Salisbury		(30)
1981	Andover		
1982	Basingstoke Town		
Total		1	(0)
- * Club domestic league appearances and goals

Alan Peter Charles Green (born 19 April 1951) is an English former professional footballer who started his career at AFC Bournemouth. He was released in the summer of 1972 after a single FA Cup senior appearance, and moved to Mansfield Town. On his first appearance for them, he collapsed due to a heart condition. He later played in the Southern League with Salisbury, where he was the club's leading scorer in the 1976/77 and 1977/78 seasons (the latter jointly with Paul Christopher). In July 1978 he was appointed as player / manager of Andover, rejoining Salisbury a year later. During his four seasons at Salisbury, he scored a total of 136 goals in all competitions. After a further spell at Andover, he finished his playing career with Basingstoke Town.
