= 1989–90 Western Football League =

Western Football League
- Season: 1989–90
- Champions: Taunton Town (Premier Division); Ottery St Mary (Division One)

The 1989–90 season was the 88th in the history of the Western Football League.

The league champions for the second time in their history were Taunton Town. The champions of Division One were Ottery St Mary.

This season marked a return to the system of three points being awarded for a win, rather than two points. The three-point system had previously been used for five seasons between 1974 and 1979.

== Final tables ==
=== Premier Division ===
The Premier Division remained at 21 clubs after Minehead were relegated to the First Division. One club joined:

- Tiverton Town, runners-up in the First Division.

Pos	Team	Pld	W	D	L	GF	GA	GD	Pts	Qualification
1	Taunton Town (C)	40	28	8	4	80	41	+39	92	
2	Liskeard Athletic	40	28	7	5	91	30	+61	91	
3	Mangotsfield United	40	27	7	6	96	42	+54	88	
4	Tiverton Town	40	26	6	8	92	51	+41	84	
5	Exmouth Town	40	24	5	11	74	37	+37	77	
6	Weston-super-Mare	40	20	8	12	86	56	+30	68	
7	Plymouth Argyle Reserves	40	19	10	11	75	47	+28	67	
8	Saltash United	40	19	9	12	62	41	+21	66	
9	Swanage Town & Herston	40	18	7	15	77	67	+10	61	Transferred to the Wessex League
10	Clevedon Town	40	16	8	16	58	60	−2	56	
11	Paulton Rovers	40	16	7	17	51	52	−1	55	
12	Bristol Manor Farm	40	13	12	15	49	59	−10	51	
13	Chippenham Town	40	14	7	19	36	46	−10	49	
14	Dawlish Town	40	12	7	21	55	78	−23	43	
15	Chard Town	40	8	14	18	50	74	−24	38	
16	Bideford	40	8	14	18	37	76	−39	38	
17	Torrington	40	8	11	21	48	74	−26	35	
18	Barnstaple Town	40	8	10	22	38	75	−37	34	
19	Radstock Town	40	7	12	21	43	82	−39	33	
20	Frome Town	40	4	14	22	43	77	−34	26	
21	Welton Rovers	40	3	5	32	30	106	−76	14	

(C) Champions

=== First Division ===
The First Division remained at 20 clubs, after Tiverton Town were promoted to the Premier Division. One new club joined:

- Minehead, relegated from the Premier Division.

Pos	Team	Pld	W	D	L	GF	GA	GD	Pts	Promotion
1	Ottery St Mary (C, P)	38	27	4	7	72	36	+36	85	Promoted to the Premier Division
2	Backwell United	38	21	10	7	63	32	+31	73	
3	Ilfracombe Town	38	20	11	7	67	38	+29	71	
4	Bridport	38	20	8	10	69	46	+23	68	
5	Odd Down	38	20	6	12	53	44	+9	66	
6	Larkhall Athletic	38	19	8	11	73	57	+16	65	
7	Westbury United	38	17	8	13	66	55	+11	59	
8	Keynsham Town	38	15	11	12	57	46	+11	56	
9	Melksham Town	38	16	7	15	46	41	+5	55	
10	Devizes Town	38	14	12	12	38	44	−6	54	
11	Heavitree United	38	15	8	15	53	44	+9	53	
12	Calne Town	38	14	11	13	52	45	+7	53	
13	Clandown	38	14	8	16	45	45	0	50	
14	Elmore	38	14	5	19	46	60	−14	47	
15	Warminster Town	38	10	12	16	43	54	−11	42	
16	Yeovil Town Reserves	38	9	9	20	46	67	−21	36	
17	Wellington	38	7	13	18	40	60	−20	34	
18	Bath City Reserves	38	9	4	25	37	82	−45	31	
19	Glastonbury	38	7	7	24	35	72	−37	28	
20	Minehead	38	5	12	21	29	62	−33	27	

Rules for classification: The system of using goal difference to separate two teams tied on points was used. The points system: 3 points for a win, 1 point for a draw and 0 points for losing.
(C) Champions; (P) Promoted
