= Stuart Barfoot =

English footballer

Personal information
- Full name: Stuart John Barfoot
- Date of birth: 10 December 1975 (age 50)
- Place of birth: Southampton, England
- Position: Full-back

Youth career
- 19??–1994: AFC Bournemouth

Senior career*
Years	Team	Apps	(Gls)
1994–1995	AFC Bournemouth	2	(0)
	Torquay United	0	(0)
- Bashley
1999–2001	Andover		
2001–????	Brockenhurst		
- * Club domestic league appearances and goals

Stuart John Barfoot (born 10 December 1975) is an English former footballer.

== Career ==
Barfoot, a full-back, began his career as an apprentice with AFC Bournemouth, turning professional in July 1994. He made just two league appearances (both as a substitute the following season, one coming against Chelsea in the League Cup in September 1994 when he replaced Sean O'Driscoll) before joining Torquay United.

He failed to break into the first team at Plainmoor, leaving league football.

In the 1997–98 season he was playing for Bashley, moving to Andover in 1999. He left Andover in May 2001, joining Brockenhurst.

In June 2003, Barfoot was part of the Southampton All-stars team that took on Brighton as part of the European Pro Beach Soccer League, playing alongside Simon Arthur, Nicky Banger, Ian Juryeff, Matt Le Tissier, David Puckett and Angus Steel.

Stuart was also a keen fisherman and a member of Marchwood Reelers.
