= Bideford A.F.C. =

English football club

Bideford
- Full name: Bideford Association Football Club
- Nickname: The Robins
- Founded: 1883
- Ground: The Sports Ground, Bideford
- Capacity: 6,000 (375 seated)
- Chairman: Ian Knight
- Manager: Sean Joyce
- League: Southern League Division One South
- 2024–25: Southern League Division One South, 10th of 22
Home colours	Away colours

Bideford Association Football Club is a football club based in Bideford, Devon, England. They are currently members of the Southern League Division One South and play at the Sports Ground. The club are nicknamed "The Robins" due to their all-red strip.

== History ==
Bideford Town was established in 1883 and spent most of their history playing in the North Devon League. In 1947 the club was reformed as Bideford A.F.C., and joined Section A of the North Devon League. Although they finished bottom of the division, they remained in Section A for the 1948–49 season, which saw them finish sixth. At the end of the season they joined Division Three of the Western League, which they won at the first attempt, winning 19 of their 20 matches and drawing the other to earn promotion to Division Two. In 1951–52 they won Division Two, and were promoted to Division One.

The league was reduced to a single division in 1960, and after finishing as runners-up in 1962–63, they won the league the following season. In 1964–65 the club reached the first round of the FA Cup for the first time. They drew 3–3 with Third Division Colchester United at Layer Road before losing the replay 2–1. They went on to win back-to-back championships in 1970–71 and 1971–72, also winning the League Cup during 1971–72, and moved up to Division One South of the Southern League in 1972. In 1973–74 they reached the first round of the FA Cup again following four replays with Falmouth Town in the third qualifying round and three replays against Trowbridge Town in the fourth. Drawn at home to Third Division Bristol Rovers, they lost 2–0.

After three seasons in the Southern League they dropped back down to the Western League. When the Western League gained a second division in 1976 Bideford were placed in the Premier Division. They finished as runners-up twice in a row in 1977–78 and 1978–79, also reaching the FA Cup first round in 1977–78, losing 3–1 at Portsmouth. They won the Western League again in 1981–82, as well as reaching the first round of the FA Cup, losing 2–1 at home to Barking. The following season saw them retain the league title, and they won the League Cup for the second time in 1984–85.

Bideford dominated the Western League in the 2000s, winning the Premier Division in 2001–02, 2003–04, 2004–05, 2005–06 and 2009–10, as well as the League Cup in 2001–02 and 2003–04. After continuously opting not to take promotion due to the increased travelling costs, in 2010 they were promoted to Division One South & West of the Southern League, which they went on to win in 2011–12, earning promotion to the Premier Division. After finishing second-from-bottom of the division in 2015–16 they were relegated back to the renamed Division One West. The division was renamed Division One South in 2018.

=== Season-by-season record ===
Season	Division	Position	Notes
1947–48	North Devon League Section A	16/16	
1948–49	North Devon League Section A	6/13	Joined Western League
1949–50	Western League Division Three	1/11	Champions, promoted
1950–51	Western League Division Two	3/20	
1951–52	Western League Division Two	1/19	Champions, promoted
1952–53	Western League Division One	4/17	
1953–54	Western League Division One	10/18	
1954–55	Western League Division One	6/18	
1955–56	Western League Division One	6/17	
1956–57	Western League Division One	14/19	
1957–58	Western League Division One	13/19	
1958–59	Western League Division One	7/19	
1959–60	Western League Division One	7/19	League reduced to a single division
1960–61	Western League	16/21	
1961–62	Western League	3/20	
1962–63	Western League	2/22	
1963–64	Western League	1/22	Champions
1964–65	Western League	2/22	
1965–66	Western League	3/18	
1966–67	Western League	6/21	
1967–68	Western League	14/21	
1968–69	Western League	2/19	
1969–70	Western League	6/20	
1970–71	Western League	1/18	Champions
1971–72	Western League	1/14	Champions, promoted
1972–73	Southern League Division One South	4/22	
1973–74	Southern League Division One South	5/20	
1974–75	Southern League Division One South	18/20	Resigned
1975–76	Western League	10/23	
1976–77	Western League Premier Division	6/18	
1977–78	Western League Premier Division	2/18	
1978–79	Western League Premier Division	2/20	
1979–80	Western League Premier Division	10/20	
1980–81	Western League Premier Division	5/20	
1981–82	Western League Premier Division	1/20	Champions
1982–83	Western League Premier Division	1/20	Champions
1983–84	Western League Premier Division	6/20	
1984–85	Western League Premier Division	2/22	
1985–86	Western League Premier Division	3/22	
1986–87	Western League Premier Division	6/22	
1987–88	Western League Premier Division	10/22	
1988–89	Western League Premier Division	16/21	
1989–90	Western League Premier Division	16/21	
1990–91	Western League Premier Division	12/21	
1991–92	Western League Premier Division	4/21	
1992–93	Western League Premier Division	14/20	
1993–94	Western League Premier Division	9/18	
1994–95	Western League Premier Division	15/18	
1995–96	Western League Premier Division	6/18	
1996–97	Western League Premier Division	12/18	
1997–98	Western League Premier Division	13/20	
1998–99	Western League Premier Division	17/20	
1999–2000	Western League Premier Division	13/19	
2000–01	Western League Premier Division	5/20	
2001–02	Western League Premier Division	1/20	Champions
2002–03	Western League Premier Division	3/18	
2003–04	Western League Premier Division	1/18	Champions
2004–05	Western League Premier Division	1/20	Champions
2005–06	Western League Premier Division	1/20	Champions
2006–07	Western League Premier Division	4/22	
2007–08	Western League Premier Division	6/21	
2008–09	Western League Premier Division	6/21	
2009–10	Western League Premier Division	1/20	Champions, promoted
2010–11	Southern League Division One South & West	10/21	
2011–12	Southern League Division One South & West	1/21	Champions, promoted
2012–13	Southern League Premier Division	20/22	
2013–14	Southern League Premier Division	8/23	
2014–15	Southern League Premier Division	15/23	
2015–16	Southern League Premier Division	23/24	Relegated
2016–17	Southern League Division One South & West	10/22	
2017–18	Southern League Division One West	8/22	
2018–19	Southern League Division One South	9/22	
2019–20	Southern League Division One South	11/20	Season abandoned
2020–21	Southern League Division One South	16/20	Season abandoned
2021–22	Southern League Division One South	12/19	
2022–23	Southern League Division One South	17/20	
2023–24	Southern League Division One South	12/19	
2024–25	Southern League Division One South	10/22	

== Reserve team ==
Bideford reserves were founder members of the South Western League in 1951 and played in the league until 1957. They joined the North Devon League in 2008. In 2015 they started playing under the name Bideford Community. The club also had an 'A' team, which played in the North Devon League from 1996 until 2002.

== Ground ==
Bideford play their games at the Sports Ground on Kingsley Road. It has a capacity of 6,000, of which 375 is seated and 1,000 covered.

== Club officials ==
- President: Richard Watts
- Chairman: Ian Knight
- First team manager: Sean Joyce
- Co-Assistant manager: Clem Bennellick
- Co-Assistant manager: Kevin Darch
- Physiotherapist: Dave Griffiths
- Kit man: Dave Griffiths
- Reserve team manager: Conor Henderson
- Ladies team manager: Roger Bonaparte

== Honours ==
- Southern League
  - Division One South & West champions 2011–12
- Western League
  - Champions 1963–64, 1970–71, 1971–72, 1981–82, 1982–83, 2001–02, 2003–04, 2004–05, 2005–06, 2009–10
  - Division Two champions 1951–52
  - Division Three champions 1949–50
  - League Cup winners 1971–72, 1984–85, 2001–02, 2003–04
  - Alan Young Cup winners 1964–65, 1969–70
- Devon St Lukes Bowl
  - Winners 1981–82, 1983–84, 1985–86, 1995–96, 2009–10, 2021–22, 2024–25
- Devon Professional Cup
  - Winners 1960–61, 1961–62, 1963–64, 1965–66, 1966–67, 1968–69, 1970–71, 1973–74, 1975–76

== Records ==
- Highest league position: 8th in the Southern League Premier Division, 2013–14
- Best FA Cup performance: First round, 1964–65, 1973–74, 1977–78, 1981–82
- Best FA Trophy performance: Second round, 1969–70
- Best FA Vase performance: Semi-finals, 2003–04
- Biggest victory: 16–1 vs Soundwell, 1950–51
  - Biggest away victory: 10–0 vs Melksham, 2003–04
- Heaviest defeat: 1–10 vs Taunton Town, 1998–99
- Most appearances: Derek May, 647
- Most goals: Tommy Robinson, 259
- Record attendance: 5,975 vs Gloucester City, FA Cup, 1949

== See also ==
- Bideford A.F.C. players
- Bideford A.F.C. managers
