= Biddestone F.C. =

English football club, active from 1976 to 2007

Biddestone
- Full name: Biddestone Football Club
- Founded: 1976
- Ground: The Sports Ground, Yatton Road, Biddestone
- Chairman: Andrew Short, Martin Jennings
- 2006–07: Western League; Division One, 13th

Biddestone F.C. was a football club based in Biddestone, near Corsham, Wiltshire, England. Biddestone Football Club has been in existence since the 1920s and the modern day team was established in 1976 as a social team, which competed in the Chippenham & District Sunday League.

They played in the Wiltshire Junior League until 1990, when they entered the Wiltshire Football League. Progressing through the county league, the club eventually won promotion to the Western League in 2004 where they remained until the 2006–07 season, after which the club withdrew from the league. The club also withdrew their reserve side from the Wiltshire League, and are currently only competing in youth and junior football.
