= Clyst Rovers F.C. =

English football club

Clyst Rovers
- Full name: Clyst Rovers Football Club
- Nickname: The Rovers
- Founded: 1951
- Dissolved: 2010
- Ground: Waterslade Park, Clyst Honiton
- 2009–10: South West Peninsula League Premier Division, (resigned mid-season)
Home colours

Clyst Rovers F.C. was a football club based in Clyst Honiton, near Exeter, Devon, England.

== History ==
The club joined the South Western League in 1981 and played there until the 1991–92 season, after which they joined the Western League. They were forced to resign from the league near the end of the 2000–01 season, but successfully re-applied for their spot in Division One the following season. Promotion to the Premier Division was finally achieved following a 4th-place finish in 2003–04, but the club went straight back down after finishing bottom of the table. They remained members of Division One of the Western League until 2007, when they joined the new South West Peninsula League Premier Division. They resigned from the league in 2009–10 and their record was expunged.

In the 1994–95 season, they reached the 1st round of the FA Vase, their best showing among the three years they entered the competition, while they never entered the FA Cup.

== Records ==
- FA Vase
  - First Round 1994–95
