= Andover F.C. =

- Full name: Andover Football Club
- Nickname: The Lions
- Founded: 1883
- Dissolved: 2011
- Ground: Portway Stadium, Andover
- Capacity: 3,000
Home colours	Away colours

Andover Football Club was an association football club based in Andover, Hampshire, established in 1883. Since the 2007–08 season, Andover had been a member of the Southern League Division One South and West at Step 4 of the National League System (i.e. four divisions below the English Football League). The club played at this level for 29 of its 128 years of existence, and played its thousandth game in this league in 2008. Compared with earlier periods, the ten years from 1998 to 2008 were relatively successful for Andover, seeing them win a number of league and cup honours as well as registering their biggest ever win.

In the 2010–11 season, the club finished twenty-first out of twenty-one teams, and was dissolved in July 2011 due to continuing financial constraints. In a statement announcing the matter, club secretary Graham Cousins expressed a hope that the club could "be resurrected to play at a more appropriate level" in the future. A new club, Andover Lions F.C. was subsequently formed and played in the Hampshire Premier League until February 2017.

== History ==
=== Early years ===
Andover Football Club was formed in 1883 and played their first game on 27 October at Stride's Field, Weyhill Road, a friendly match against Basingstoke Mechanical Engineers. Three years later they moved to the Walled Meadow, where they played their home matches for the next 96 years. For most of the next thirty years, the club competed in three separate small leagues which were run side by side during the space of each season; the Hampshire League, the Salisbury and District League, and the North Hants May League. During this time, Andover won the Salisbury League eight times, the North Hants May League five times and reached the Hampshire Junior Cup final twice.

Andover competed in the first Hampshire Senior Cup in 1888, but became involved in controversy after they were knocked out of the competition by Woolston Works. During this match, a Glasgow–based player called J. Kesson played for Woolston in their victory. Andover protested that Kesson should be disqualified on the grounds of residency—although he had played for Woolston Works earlier that season, he had since moved back to Glasgow. Woolston's appeal rested on the fact that Kesson had left some items of clothing at his lodgings in Woolston, and this should be interpreted as his intention to return. The Hampshire FA upheld the appeal, allowing Woolston to progress through to the next round and eventually win the inaugural competition.

Andover joined the newly formed Southern League Second Division South West section in 1898. They won just two of their ten games at this higher level and finished bottom of their six-team division, which also included Cowes, Ryde and Eastleigh. After just one season, they moved back down to county league football along with the majority of teams in that division.

=== 1900 to the Second World War ===
Until the First World War Andover played in the Hampshire League North Division (the Hampshire League at this time was composed of a number of regional divisions instead of the present-day hierarchical structure), and their first major honour came in 1913–14 when they won that division. Competition was suspended during the war, and upon the restart they rejoined the Hampshire League in the North Division before moving to an enlarged County Division in the 1920–21 season. It was while in this division that they won their most prestigious title to date, the league championship in 1924–25.

Division One of the Hampshire League was formed at the start of the 1929–30 season, and Andover were almost permanent members of that division, winning their first title in 1934–35. The only slip was in 1936–37 when they were relegated, but they returned the following year after winning promotion from Division Two. The club remained active during the Second World War, winning the Hampshire League title in 1944–45.

Andover had a certain degree of success in county cup competitions during this period. They reached the final of the Hampshire Senior Cup twice, in 1931 and 1933, losing to Winchester City and Newport (IOW) respectively. They also won the Russell Cotes Cup four times and reached the final a further three times.

=== Post-war years ===
Andover continued playing in Division One of the Hampshire League after the war. They had success during the period between 1948 and 1951, winning two more Hampshire League championships as well as winning the Hampshire Senior Cup for the first two times in the club's history. In 1960–61, Andover won the Russell Cotes Cup for the sixth time, while the reserves were champions of Division Two and won the County Intermediate Cup for the second successive season. The following year saw the first team win their eighth Hampshire League championship and retain the Russell Cotes Cup, while the Reserves were champions of Division Two again. Ian Henderson broke his own goalscoring record set the previous year, scoring 62 goals.

In 1962, the club followed Salisbury and stepped up to the Western League. This proved to be quite a different challenge—whereas before they had only competed against local teams in league competition, they now faced opposition from teams as far afield as Somerset and Devon as well as the reserve teams of league clubs such as Bristol Rovers, Bristol City and Torquay United. They generally fared well, only failing to finish in the top half of the table twice during their time at this level. Their first season in the Western League saw the club reach the first round proper of the FA Cup for the only time in their history after defeating Hendon 5–4 in a fourth qualifying round replay. On 3 November, Fourth Division side Gillingham came to the Walled Meadow and won 1–0 in front of 3484 spectators, a figure which would remain as the club's largest attendance for a home game. In the league Andover finished fourth, but that was their highest placing until 1969–70 when they finished as runners-up.

This was repeated the following season, and so in 1971 Andover took another step up and joined the Southern League. Now competing against teams from an even wider area spanning almost the entire width of the country (ranging from Bideford in the west to Bury Town in the east) and in some cases with a larger budget and fanbase, competition was always tough with the club generally finishing in the bottom half of the table. The highest position the club reached at this level was the sixth place reached in 1987–88 and again in 1991–92.

=== Move to the Portway Stadium ===
In 1989 the Walled Meadow was sold for redevelopment and the club moved to the brand new Portway Stadium, which is located on the West Portway Industrial Estate. A crowd of 1,100 watched the official opening match against Leicester City, with the league team coming away with a 10–1 victory. After much deliberation over the cost and distance of travel involved in Southern League football, the club voluntarily stepped down the pyramid ladder to join the Wessex League in 1993–94.

The first season saw them finish runners-up, but the club's management declined to apply for promotion back into the Southern League and so they remained in the Wessex League. In the following three seasons they were placed seventh, ninth and sixth, but 1997–98 saw the club finish runners-up again, winning promotion back to the Southern League. Returning after a five-year absence, it was not long before the difference in quality between the two leagues became evident, and the club soon realised that it was unable to compete financially with the bigger clubs in the division. At the beginning of the year the club announced its intention to return to the Wessex League for 1999–2000, a decision taken because it was felt it would be better to play in a league in which it could compete financially and successfully.

=== 2000 to 2011 ===
The next few years saw Andover enjoying its most successful spell for many decades. The first season back in the Wessex League saw the club finish third. They also reached the final of the Hampshire Senior Cup for the first time in 35 years, losing 1–9 to Aldershot Town in what is the Shots' record win in their current incarnation. The team scored a total of 233 goals in all competitions, including a club record 88 goals scored by Andy Forbes.

Andover won the Wessex League championship for the first time in the 2000–01 season, scoring a club record 153 league goals including a 14–1 win over Swanage Town & Herston, the club's record victory. In addition, they won the Hampshire Senior Cup for the fifth time in the club's history, beating Havant & Waterlooville 2–0 at The Dell. They also retained the North Hants Senior Cup to complete a treble.

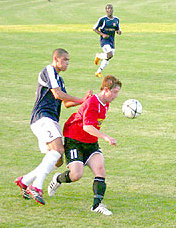
Andover's Michael Turvey (in red) in action against Salisbury City in a pre-season friendly played on 22 July 2008 to mark the club's 125th anniversary

They retained the League title the following year, winning the championship by a single point from Fleet Town following a 1–1 draw at Fleet on the last day of the season—this match was played in front of 623 people, a record attendance for a Wessex League match up to that date. The Lions gained another treble by also winning the League Cup and Russell Cotes Cup. The club won the North Hants Senior Cup again in 2002–03, and reached the semi-finals of both the Hampshire Senior Cup and the Russell Cotes Cup. Another Wessex League attendance record was set towards the end of the season when 702 people saw Andover's 6–1 win over Eastleigh.

Despite this period of success, the club failed to attract significant local support. The club was close to extinction during the summer of 2003 after the chairman resigned, and was only saved when twelve supporters secured its future by purchasing the lease for the Portway Stadium from the outgoing chairman. The 2003–04 season brought success in the FA Vase competition, when Andover reached the quarterfinals for the first time in their history, before losing to Hampshire rivals Winchester City. They finished sixth in the league and won the North Hants Senior Cup for the fifth time. The 2004–05 season saw an improvement in the league with a fifth-place finish; the reserves finished runners up in the Wessex Combination East division. The club also won the North Hants Senior Cup for the sixth time.

Under the 2006 pyramid reorganisations, a third-place finish in the Wessex League was good enough for promotion back to the Southern League, along with local rivals Winchester City and Thatcham Town. In their first season back, they finished in ninth place, just five points from the divisional playoffs. They were unable to build on this and struggled to a nineteenth-place finish in the following season, ultimately finishing 29 points above relegation after Slough Town were reprieved following Halifax Town's expulsion from the Football Conference. Andover's home match against Uxbridge, played towards the end of that season, was the club's thousandth game in the Southern League.

The beginning of the 2008–09 season saw the Lions marking their 125th anniversary with a pre-season friendly against local rivals Salisbury City. Prior to the game, it had been announced that the club would also be wearing a new kit design to mark this occasion for one season only—a plain red shirt (a departure from the traditional red and black stripes) was worn for the first time during this game, which Andover won 3–2. The season itself saw Andover have their best run in the FA Trophy to date, eventually losing 0–3 at home to Newport County in the third qualifying round.

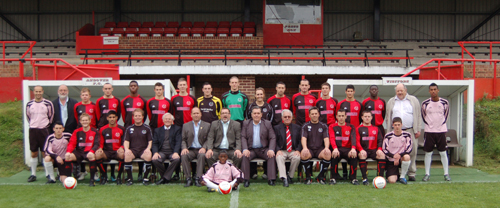
Andover F.C.'s squad for the 2010–11 season, their final season of league competition

The start of the 2010–11 season was disrupted due to damage caused to the Portway Stadium pitch by rabbits, leading to a number of home league games being postponed. An FA Cup match against Chertsey Town was played at Whitchurch United's Longmeadow Ground, and their FA Trophy match against Bideford was played at Winchester City's Denplan City Ground. The Lions were unable to recover and struggled throughout the season, failing to win a single home game and finishing bottom of the division with eleven points after conceding more than 100 goals. However, the club avoided relegation due to the resignation of Almondsbury Town F.C. earlier in the season.

=== Dissolution and reformation ===
Following the 2010–11 season, a new chairman and manager were appointed by the club. However, the manager resigned shortly afterwards to take up a post at Rotherham United F.C., and the chairman resigned citing continuing financial constraints. The remaining board members formally wound up the club and resigned from the Southern League in July 2011.

However, it wasn't quite the end and after gaining clearance from the Football Association and the Hampshire F.A., the club's old Reserve side became known as Andover Lions and were allowed to continue playing in the Hampshire League 2004, using the adjacent Charlton Sports Centre for home fixtures. The Lions progressed on the Hampshire Premier League but sadly folded midway through the 2016–17 season.

=== Honours ===
FA Vase	Quarter Finalists	2004
Wessex League	Winners	2001, 2002
Wessex League	Runners Up	1994, 1998
Wessex League Cup	Winners	2002
Wessex League Cup	Finalist	2006
Hampshire Senior Cup	Winners	1949,1951, 1956, 1965, 2001
Hampshire Senior Cup	Finalist	1931, 1933, 1957, 2000
North Hants Senior Cup	Winners	2000, 2001, 2003, 2004, 2005, 2011
North Hants Senior Cup	Finalists	2002, 2007, 2009
Hampshire League	Winners	1914, 1925, 1934, 1945, 1949, 1951, 1962
Hampshire League	Runners Up	1907, 1956
Hampshire League Division Two	Winners	1962
Hampshire League Division Two	Runners Up	1938
Russell Cotes Cup	Winners	1924, 1932,1938, 1945, 1959, 1961, 1962, 2002
Russell Cotes Cup	Finalists	1926, 1935, 1942, 1949, 1952, 1954
Pickford Cup	Winners	1951
Hampshire Junior Cup	Winners	1920
Hampshire Junior Cup	Finalists	1894, 1911, 1913
Hampshire Intermediate Cup	Winners	1960, 1961
Salisbury & District League	Winners	1895, 1896, 1897, 1900, 1904, 1908, 1913, 1929
Salisbury & District League	Runners Up	1920
North Hants May league	Winners	1899, 1901, 1902, 1908, 1909
North Hants May league	Runners Up	1904, 1905, 1906
Hampshire Combination League	Winners	1988
North Hants Invitation Cup	Winners	1968
North Hants Invitation Cup	Finalists	1975
Andover Open Cup	Winners	1987, 1988
Andover Open Cup	Finalists	1991
Basingstoke Senior Cup	Finalists	2006

== Ground ==
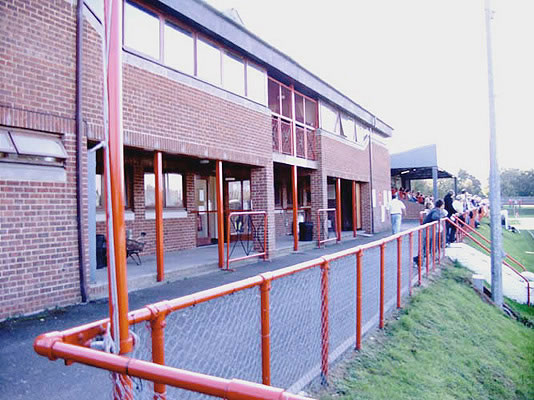
Photograph of the Portway Stadium, showing the clubhouse, stand and banking

Previously, the club played at the Walled Meadow, near to the town centre. The ground had a main wooden stand along one side (which incorporated the changing rooms), and a bank of covered terracing on the opposite side. The ground was mainly accessed via the car park off London Road, with turnstiles also situated on Eastfield Road behind the main stand. Since the club left the Walled Meadow in 1989, the ground has been demolished and the site is now used for a housing development of the same name.

In 1989 the club moved to the Portway Stadium, situated in the Portway Industrial Estate on the western outskirts of the town. Built at a cost of £850,000, the ground has a main stand of brick and concrete construction with bench seating for around 250 people. This stand is set on a bank running along the entire south side of the ground, giving spectators on that side an elevated view of the pitch. The managers' benches are set into this banking in front of the stand at pitch level. The banking slopes down behind each goal until it reaches the same level as the pitch along the north side. There is hard standing around the entire perimeter of pitch, along with a turnstile block and a gate opening out onto the stadium car park for ambulance access.

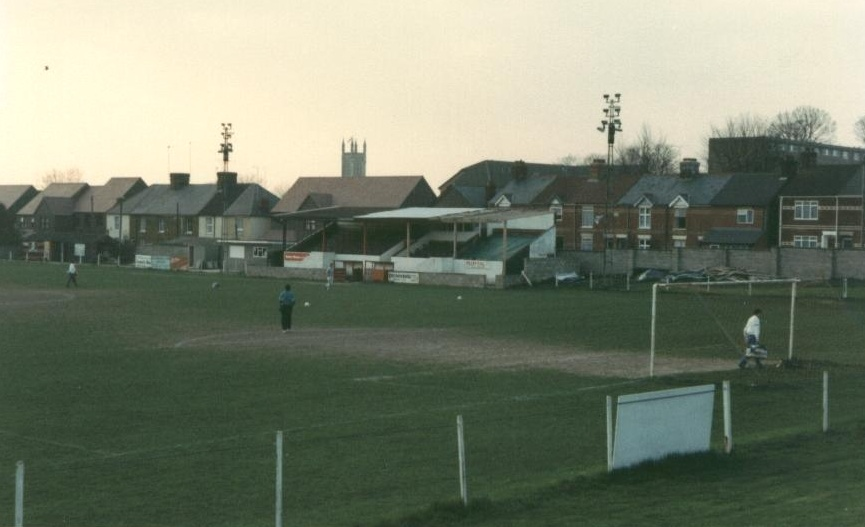
View of the Walled Meadow's main stand c.1988. Damage sustained during the Great Storm of 1987 can be seen on the near side of the stand.

The stadium's clubhouse (named the Portway Suite) is also situated on this elevated side, just inside the turnstiles. The clubhouse houses a function suite and bar at first-floor level, and changing rooms, physio room, public announcement equipment, toilets and a tea bar at ground-floor level.

In addition to hosting the club's first, reserve and youth team fixtures, the Portway Stadium has also played host to a number of local and regional cup matches. They include Hampshire Senior Cup semi-finals, Hampshire Floodlit Youth Cup finals, and the South West Counties Women's Championship playoff final.

Following the demise of Andover F.C. in 2011, the stadium was unused for 2 years until the newly formed Andover Town won the lease for its use and, after a major facelift, regular football returned to the venue with the newly established outfit gaining direct entry into the Wessex League First Division where they gained promotion after their first season.

== Supporters ==
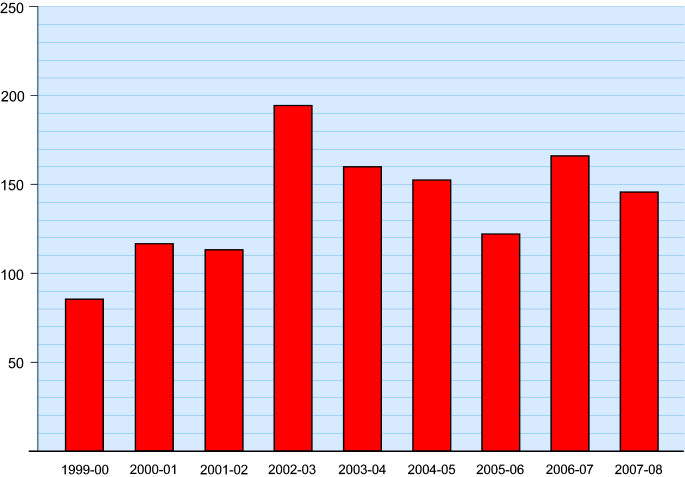
Graph showing average home league attendances from 1999 to 2008

In the 2008–09 season, Andover's average attendance was 149, representing a small increase of three compared to the previous season. This figure was the 11th highest in the division, falling around twenty short of the division's mean average.

Attendance levels at Andover's matches reached a peak in the late 1960s. During the 1969–70 season, home attendances at league matches averaged over 550, with the largest crowd being the 2,144 people who watched their FA Cup match against local rivals Salisbury. In the years following their promotion to the Southern League, average attendances started to drop until they dipped below the 200 mark during the 1970s. Since then, the average attendance at Andover's matches has remained at approximately 140, although this figure dipped below 100 in the 1999–2000 season following their last relegation from the Southern League. Just three seasons later however, this figure had risen to just under 200 following the club's second consecutive Wessex League championship and successes in cup competitions.

=== Rivalries ===
Traditionally, Andover's supporters regarded Salisbury as their local rivals, with matches between the two teams often attracting larger attendances than average for Andover's home games. This rivalry was encouraged by the fact that the two teams played in the same division for all but three years between Andover's admission into the Western League in 1962 and their step down to the Wessex League in 1992. With Salisbury City's rise up the football pyramid separating the two teams, the nearest club in Andover's division was Whitchurch United, until Winchester City were promoted from the Hampshire League in 2003. Their rivalry quickly grew and was at its closest during that season's FA Vase competition, in which the two clubs were drawn against each other at the quarter-final stage. This rivalry continued following the two teams' simultaneous promotion to the Southern Football League in 2006.

Andover New Street, a Wessex League team who play just outside the town, were also considered rivals. The two teams competed in an annual pre-season tournament known as the Dango Memorial Cup (a charity tournament named in honour of a former player who appeared for both teams), together with two other invited clubs.

== Colours and crest ==
Home colours, 1950–1957.
Home colours, 1972–1988.

Andover's traditional strip of red and black stripes was worn for the vast majority of their history. This was changed to red and black quarters in 1950 and remained so until 1957 when the club reverted to the traditional stripes. When promotion to the Southern League was gained in 1972, the team's colours were changed, this time to red with a single white stripe. This kit was worn until 1988, when the familiar red and black stripes were re-introduced. For the 2008–09 season, a plain red kit was introduced to commemorate the club's 125th anniversary—this was worn for the first time in the pre-season friendly against Salisbury City. The last away kit worn by the team was yellow and black shirts with white shorts. However, various combinations have been worn in recent years, such as white shirts with blue sleeves and blue shorts, and tangerine shirts with white shorts.

Andover's badge depicted a lion standing under an oak tree, which mirrors the design used on the town coat of arms. This badge was first used during the 1950s.

== Playing records ==
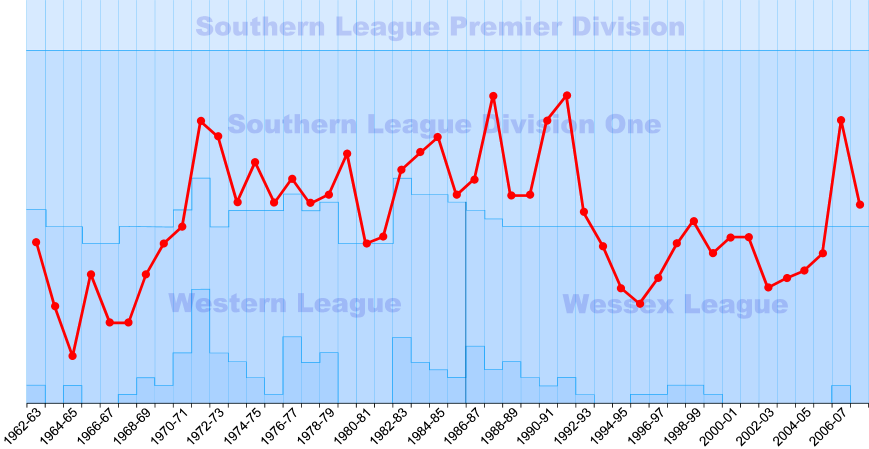
Graph showing Andover's finishing league positions from 1962 to 2008

- Best league performance: Sixth in Southern League Southern Division, 1987–88 and 1991–92
- Best FA Cup performance: First round, 1962–63
- Best FA Trophy performance: Third qualifying round, 2008–09
- Best FA Vase performance: Quarter-finals (sixth round), 2003–04
- Highest Scorer in a Season: Andy Forbes, 86 goals in 1999–2000
- Worst Defeat: 0–24 vs. Ryde Sports, Hampshire League, 27 January 1900
- Record attendances:
  - Walled Meadow: 3,484 vs. Gillingham, FA Cup first round, 3 November 1962
  - Portway Stadium: 1,183 vs. Portsmouth XI, friendly

=== Record victories ===
Competition	Scoreline, Opponent and Date
Southern League	8–1 vs. Gosport Borough, 6 April 1991
FA Cup	7–0 vs. Pirelli General, 6 September 1947
Wessex League	14–1 vs. Swanage Town & Herston, 17 February 2001
Hampshire Senior Cup	9–0 vs. Paulsgrove, 27 September 1994
Western League	8–1 vs. Glastonbury, 8 December 1962
Hampshire League	11–0 vs. Salisbury Corinthians, 31 January 1948

=== League history 1896–2011 ===
Season	Division	Position	Significant events
1896/97	Hampshire League	7/8	Founder Members
1897/98	Hampshire League	7/8	Left competition
1898/99	Southern League Division 2 South & West Section	6/6	Left competition
1899/1900	Hampshire League	7/8	Left competition
1900-02			
1902/03	Hampshire League	8/8	
1903/04	Hampshire League North Division	4/8	
1904/05	Hampshire League North Division	3/6	
1905/06	Hampshire League North Division	4/6	
1906/07	Hampshire League North Division	2/7	Runners-up
1907/08	Hampshire League North Division	3/7	
1908/09	Hampshire League North Division	4/6	
1909/10	Hampshire League North Division	4/6	
1910/11	Hampshire League North Division	4/7	
1911/12	Hampshire League North Division	5/6	
1912/13	Hampshire League North Division	6/7	
1913/14	Hampshire League North Division	1/6	Champions
1914-19			
1919/20	Hampshire League North Division	4/6	Re-organisation
1920/21	Hampshire League County Division	8/12	
1921/22	Hampshire League County Division	11/16	
1922/23	Hampshire League County Division	11/17	
1923/24	Hampshire League County Division	5/16	
1924/25	Hampshire League County Division	1/16	Champions
1925/26	Hampshire League County Division	9/16	
1926/27	Hampshire League County Division	16/16	Not relegated
1927/28	Hampshire League County Division	14/16	Re-organisation
1928/29	Hampshire League North Division	5/10	Re-organisation
1929/30	Hampshire League Division 1	6/16	
1930/31	Hampshire League Division 1	13/16	
1931/32	Hampshire League Division 1	5/16	
1932/33	Hampshire League Division 1	8/15	
1933/34	Hampshire League Division 1	1/16	Champions
1934/35	Hampshire League Division 1	7/16	
1935/36	Hampshire League Division 1	6/16	
1936/37	Hampshire League Division 1	16/16	Relegated
1937/38	Hampshire League Division 2	2/14	Runners-up, promoted
1938/39	Hampshire League Division 1	14/16	
1939-45			
1945/46	Hampshire League Division 1	5/16	
1946/47	Hampshire League Division 1	13/14	Not relegated
1947/48	Hampshire League Division 1	5/14	
1948/49	Hampshire League Division 1	1/14	Champions
1949/50	Hampshire League Division 1	3/14	
1950/51	Hampshire League Division 1	1/14	Champions
1951/52	Hampshire League Division 1	6/14	
1952/53	Hampshire League Division 1	8/14	
1953/54	Hampshire League Division 1	12/14	
1954/55	Hampshire League Division 1	5/14	
1955/56	Hampshire League Division 1	3/14	
1956/57	Hampshire League Division 1	10/14	
1957/58	Hampshire League Division 1	10/14	
1958/59	Hampshire League Division 1	3/14	
1959/60	Hampshire League Division 1	7/14	
1960/61	Hampshire League Division 1	3/16	
1961/62	Hampshire League Division 1	1/16	Champions, promoted
1962/63	Western League	4/22	
1963/64	Western League	10/22	
1964/65	Western League	16/22	
1965/66	Western League	4/18	
1966/67	Western League	10/21	
1967/68	Western League	10/21	
1968/69	Western League	6/19	
1969/70	Western League	2/20	Runners-up
1970/71	Western League	2/18	Runners-up, promoted
1971/72	Southern League Division 1 South	9/16	
1972/73	Southern League Division 1 South	11/22	
1973/74	Southern League Division 1 South	19/20	Re-elected
1974/75	Southern League Division 1 South	14/20	
1975/76	Southern League Division 1 South	19/20	Re-elected
1976/77	Southern League Division 1 South	16/18	
1977/78	Southern League Division 1 South	19/20	Re-elected
1978/79	Southern League Division 1 South	18/21	
1979/80	Southern League Division 1 South	13/24	Re-organisation
1980/81	Southern League Southern Division	24/24	Re-elected
1981/82	Southern League Southern Division	23/24	Re-elected
1982/83	Southern League Southern Division	17/18	Re-organisation
1983/84	Southern League Southern Division	15/18	
1984/85	Southern League Southern Division	13/18	
1985/86	Southern League Southern Division	20/21	Re-elected
1986/87	Southern League Southern Division	16/20	
1987/88	Southern League Southern Division	19/20	Re-elected
1988/89	Southern League Southern Division	18/22	
1989/90	Southern League Southern Division	18/22	
1990/91	Southern League Southern Division	9/21	
1991/92	Southern League Southern Division	6/22	
1992/93	Southern League Southern Division	20/22	Left competition
1993/94	Wessex League	2/22	
1994/95	Wessex League	7/22	
1995/96	Wessex League	9/21	
1996/97	Wessex League	6/21	
1997/98	Wessex League	2/21	Runners-up, promoted
1998/99	Southern League Southern Division	21/22	Relegated
1999/00	Wessex League	3/21	
2000/01	Wessex League	1/23	Champions
2001/02	Wessex League	1/23	Champions
2002/03	Wessex League	7/22	
2003/04	Wessex League	6/22	Re-organisation
2004/05	Wessex League Premier Division	5/22	
2005/06	Wessex League Premier Division	3/22	Promoted
2006/07	Southern League Division 1 South & West	9/22	
2007/08	Southern League Division 1 South & West	19/22	
2008/09	Southern League Division 1 South & West	19/22	
2009/10	Southern League Division 1 South & West	19/22	
2010/11	Southern League Division 1 South & West	21/21	Folded

=== FA Cup ===
Season	Round	Opponents	Result
1946/47	Preliminary round	A v Thornycrft Athletic	L 0–2
1947/48	Extra-Preliminary round	H v Pirelli General	W 7–0
	Preliminary round	A v Salisbury Corinthians	W 2–1
	1st qualifying round	A v Poole Town	W 2–1
1948/49	Preliminary round	A v Weymouth	L 0–3
1949/50	Extra-Preliminary round	A v Ryde Sports	L 0–1
1950/51	Extra-Preliminary round	A v Ryde Sports	L 1–2
1951/52	Preliminary round	A v Westbury United	L 1–5
1952/53	Preliminary round	H v Frome Town	L 2–3
1953/54	Preliminary round	A v Melksham Town	W 5–1
	1st qualifying round	A v Salisbury City	L 1–2
1954/55	1st qualifying round	A v Basingstoke Town	L 1–3
1955/56	1st qualifying round	H v Gosport Borough	W 5–0
	2nd qualifying round	H v Winchester City	W 2–1
	3rd qualifying round	A v Fareham Town	D 2-2
	Replay	H v Fareham Town	L 0–2
1956/57	1st qualifying round	A v Chichester City	W 3–2
	2nd qualifying round	H v Bournemouth Gasworks Athletic	W 3–2
	3rd qualifying round	H v Winchester City	W 2–0
	4th qualifying round	A v Cheltenham Town	L 1–2
1957/58	1st qualifying round	H v Chichester City	L 2–3
1958/59	1st qualifying round	H v Winchester City	W 4–1
	2nd qualifying round	H v Fareham Town	W 1–0
	3rd qualifying round	H v Alton Town	W 3–2
	4th qualifying round	A v Guildford City	L 0–1
1959/60	1st qualifying round	H v Gosport Borough	D 0-0
	Replay	A v Gosport Borough	W 1–0
	2nd qualifying round	A v Cowes	L 0–3
1960/61	2nd qualifying round	A v Fareham Town	D 3-3
	Replay	H v Fareham Town	W 3–2
	3rd qualifying round	A v Chichester City	L 1–2
1961/62	1st qualifying round	H v Alton Town	W 5–1
	2nd qualifying round	H v Basingstoke Town	W 7–1
	3rd qualifying round	H v Cowes	W 2–1
	4th qualifying round	A v Yeovil Town	L 0–4
1962/63	1st qualifying round	H v Cowes	W 4–1
	2nd qualifying round	H v Basingstoke Town	W 2–1
	3rd qualifying round	A v Alton Town	D 1-1
	Replay	H v Alton Town	W 4–1
	4th qualifying round	A v Hendon	D 1-1
	Replay	H v Hendon	W 5–4
	1st round	H v Gillingham	L 0–1
1963/64	Preliminary round	H v Newport	W 2–0
	1st qualifying round	H v Cowes	D 1-1
	Replay	A v Cowes	L 2–4
1964/65	1st qualifying round	H v Alton Town	W 4–1
	2nd qualifying round	A v Fareham Town	L 1–2
1965/66	1st qualifying round	A v Warminster Town	W 4–0
	2nd qualifying round	H v Salisbury City	L 0–3
1966/67	1st qualifying round	A v Newbury Town	W 3–0
	2nd qualifying round	A v Fareham Town	L 0–1
1967/68	1st qualifying round	A v Newport	L 3–4
1968/69	Preliminary round	A v Selsey	L 0–1
1969/70	1st qualifying round	H v Newport	W 4–1
	2nd qualifying round	H v Waterlooville	W 2–1
	3rd qualifying round	H v Salisbury	D 0-0
	Replay	A v Salisbury	L 0–3
1970/71	1st qualifying round	H v Bath City	L 0–1
1971/72	1st qualifying round	A v Melksham Town	W 3–1
	2nd qualifying round	H v Basingstoke Town	L 1–3
1972/73	1st qualifying round	A v Dorchester Town	D 1-1
	Replay	H v Dorchester Town	W 2–1
	2nd qualifying round	H v Salisbury City	L 0–1
1973/74	1st qualifying round	A v Bath City	L 0–3
1974/75	Preliminary round	A v Basingstoke Town	L 0–1
1975/76	1st qualifying round	H v Frome Town	D 1-1
	Replay	A v Frome Town	L 3–5
1976/77	1st qualifying round	A v Alton Town	L 0–1
1977/78	1st qualifying round	H v Three Bridges	W 2–0
	2nd qualifying round	A v Horsham	L 2–3
1978/79	Preliminary round	H v Newbury Town	D 1-1
	Replay	A v Newbury Town	W 2–1
	1st qualifying round	A v Yeovil Town	L 0–4
1979/80	Preliminary round	A v Gosport Borough	L 1–2
1980/81	1st qualifying round	A v Alton Town	W 3–0
	2nd qualifying round	H v Poole Town	L 0–2
1981/82	1st qualifying round	H v Pagham	L 1–2
1982/83	Preliminary round	A v Wokingham Town	L 1–6
1983/84	1st qualifying round	H v AFC Totton	L 1–3
1984/85	Preliminary round	H v Calne Town	W 6–0
	1st qualifying round	H v Fareham Town	L 1–2
1985/86	1st qualifying round	H v Hungerford Town	L 1–3
1986/87	Preliminary round	H v Sholing Sports	W 1–0
	1st qualifying round	A v Devizes Town	L 2–5
1987/88	Preliminary round	A v Melksham Town	L 0–2
1988/89	Preliminary round	A v Chippenham Town	L 0–4
1989/90	Preliminary round	H v Camberley Town	D 2-2
	Replay	A v Camberley Town	W 5–1
	1st qualifying round	H v Devizes Town	W 2–0
	2nd qualifying round	A v Marlow	L 2–3
1990/91	Preliminary round	A v Croydon Athletic	D 2-2
	Replay	H v Croydon Athletic	W 7–1
	1st qualifying round	H v Horsham YMCA	W 3–0
	Round	H v Bromley	W 2–0
	3rd qualifying round	H v Marlow	L 0–1
1991/92	1st qualifying round	A v Selsey	L 1–6
1992/93	Preliminary round	H v Ringmer	W 5–0
	1st qualifying round	H v Hampton	L 0–6
1993/94	1st qualifying round	A v Buckingham Town	W 1–0
	2nd qualifying round	H v Eastleigh	W 3–0
	3rd qualifying round	H v Bashley	L 0–2
1994/95	1st qualifying round	A v Cove	W 2–0
	2nd qualifying round	A v Wokingham Town	L 0–3
1995/96	Preliminary round	A v Abingdon Town	L 2–3
1996/97	Preliminary round	A v Wimborne Town	D 1-1
	Replay	H v Wimborne Town	L 0–1
1997/98	Preliminary round	H v Portsmouth Royal Navy	L 3–4
1998/99	1st qualifying round	H v Deal Town	L 2–5
1999/2000	Preliminary round	A v Backwell United	L 1–5
2000/01	Preliminary round	A v Sandhurst Town	W 4–0
	1st qualifying round	H v Saltwell United	L 2–3
2001/02	Preliminary round	H v Ramsgate	W 4–0
	1st qualifying round	H v Moneyfields	W 2–1
	2nd qualifying round	H v Bashley	D 1-1
	Replay	A v Bashley	W 2–0
	3rd qualifying round	H v Newport County	L 0–4
2002/03	Preliminary round	A v Walton & Hersham	L 1–2
2003/04	Extra-Preliminary round	A v East Preston	W 3–2
	Preliminary round	A v Chatham Town	W 4–2
	1st qualifying round	H v Arundel	W 5–0
	2nd qualifying round	A v Cirencester City	L 2–3
2004/05	Preliminary round	A v Ringmer	L 2–3
2005/06	Extra-Preliminary round	H v Didcot Town	D 4-4
	Replay	A v Didcot Town	L 0–2
2006/07	Preliminary round	H v Corinthian Casuals	D 1-1
	Replay	A v Corinthian Casuals	W 4–3
	1st qualifying round	H v Carshalton Athletic	L 0–2
2007/08	Preliminary round	H v Oxford City	L 3–4
2008/09	Preliminary round	A v Calne Town	L 1–3
2009/10	Preliminary round	H v Molesey	L 2–3
2010/11	Preliminary round	A v Sittingbourne	W 1–0
	1st qualifying round	H v Chertsey Town	L 0–4

=== FA Trophy ===
Season	Round	Opponents	Result
1969/70	3rd qualifying round	A v Hereford United	L 0–2
1970/71	3rd qualifying round	H v Margate	L 1–3
1971/72	1st qualifying round	H v Salisbury City	D 0-0
	Replay	A v Salisbury City	L 3–4
1972/73	1st qualifying round	H v Wealdstone	L 2–4
1973/74	1st qualifying round	A v Guildford City	L 1–2
1974/75	Preliminary round	A v Salisbury City	D 0-0
	Replay	H v Salisbury City	D 2-2
	2nd replay	A v Salisbury City	L 0–2
1975/76	Preliminary round	A v Staines Town	L 0–3
1976/77	Preliminary round	H v Wokingham Town	W 1–0
	1st qualifying round	H v Basingstoke Town	L 1–2
1977/78	Preliminary round	A v Alton Town	L 0–1
1978/79	Preliminary round	A v Fareham Town	L 0–3
1979/80	Preliminary round	A v Wokingham Town	L 1–2
1980/81	1st qualifying round	A v Canterbury City	L 1–3
1981/82	1st qualifying round	A v Tonbridge	L 1–2
1982/83	Preliminary round	A v Melksham Town	L 1–2
1983/84	1st qualifying round	A v Chatham Town	W 2–1
	2nd qualifying round	A v Leatherhead	L 0–2
1984/85	1st qualifying round	H v Epsom & Ewell	D 0-0
	Replay	A v Epsom & Ewell	L 1–2
1985/86	1st qualifying round	A v Road-Sea Southampton	L 0–3
1986/87	Preliminary round	H v Harlow Town	L 2–3
1987/88	1st qualifying round	A v Gloucester City	L 0–3
1988/89	1st qualifying round	A v Ton Pentre	D 3-3
	Replay	H v Ton Pentre	W 3–2
	2nd qualifying round	H v Salisbury City	L 2–5
1989/90	1st qualifying round	A v Margate	L 0–3
1990/91	1st qualifying round	H v Canterbury City	D 1-1
	Replay	A v Canterbury City	W 3–2
	2nd qualifying round	H v Salisbury City	L 1–2
1991/92	1st qualifying round	H v Bashley	L 1–2
1992/93	1st qualifying round	H v Abingdon Town	L 0–3
1998/99	1st qualifying round	A v Kettering Town	L 0–4
2006/07	Preliminary round	H v Chesham United	W 3–1
	1st qualifying round	A v Marlow	D 0-0
	Replay	H v Marlow	L 1–2
2007/08	Preliminary round	H v AFC Hayes	W 4–2
	1st qualifying round	A v Uxbridge	L 1–4
2008/09	Preliminary round	A v Didcot Town	W 2–1
	1st qualifying round	H v Gosport Borough	W 3–2
	2nd qualifying round	H v Merthyr Tydfil	W 3–2
	3rd qualifying round	H v Newport County	L 0–3
2009/10	Preliminary round	A v AFC Totton	L 0–2
2010/11	Preliminary round	H v Bideford	L 2–3

=== FA Vase ===
Season	Round	Opponents	Result
1993/94	Round 1	A v Ryde Sports	W 3–0
	Round 2	H v Bideford	W 6–2
	Round 3	A v Falmouth Town	L 1–3
1994/95	Round 1	A v Eton Wick	L 4–6
1995/96	2nd qualifying round	H v Abingdon United	W 3–1
	Round 1	H v Furness	L 1–4
1996/97	1st qualifying round	H v Downton	L 1–4
1997/98	2nd qualifying round	A v Calne Town	W 3–2
	Round 1	H v Keynsham Town	W 5–0
	Round 2	A v Chippenham Town	L 2–3
1999/00	Round 2	H v Lymington & New Milton	L 1–2
2000/01	Preliminary round	A v Eastbourne Town	L 1–5
2001/02	2nd qualifying round	A v Gosport Borough	D 2-2
	Replay	H v Gosport Borough	W 4–2
	Round 1	H v Yate Town	W 2–1
	Round 2	H v Taunton Town	L 2–4
2002/03	Round 1	H v AFC Newbury	W 3–1
	Round 2	A v AFC Totton	L 0–2
2003/04	2nd qualifying round	A v Siddlesham	W 5–2
	Round 1	H v Hillingdon Borough	W 3–2
	Round 2	A v Christchurch	W 2–0
	Round 3	H v Three Bridges	W 4–3
	Round 4	A v North Leigh	W 1–0
	Round 5	A v Leighton Town	W 3–1
	Quarter-finals	H v Winchester City	L 1–5
2004/05	Round 2	H v Fareham Town	L 0–2
2005/06	2nd qualifying round	A v Guildford United	W 5–1
	Round 1	A v Whitstable Town	W 3–1
	Round 2	A v Maidstone United	L 0–4

== Finances and structure ==
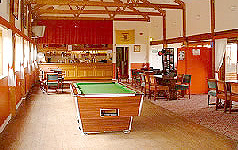
The Portway Suite, the clubhouse at the Portway Stadium provided a secondary source of income for the club.

Prior to its dissolution, Andover Football Club was run as a Private Limited Company. The twelve-man consortium who took over the club in 2003 were the club shareholders, with the club president being the majority shareholder, the club chairman holding the second-largest number of shares, and the remainder of the shares distributed equally among the other members of the board and management committee.

Andover were sponsored by a number of local companies including the Hospital Saving Association (HSA), a locally based health insurance firm who have also sponsored Blackburn Rovers in the past.

In addition to gate receipts, the club derived income from club merchandise sold in the club shop, and the Portway Suite (the clubhouse at the Portway Stadium). The suite was able to be rented out for private events such as wedding receptions and birthday parties as well as hosting club events such as quiz nights. A boardroom was also available for conferences and meetings.

== Former players ==
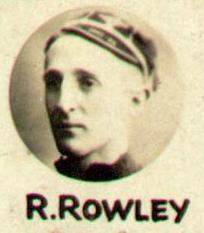
Dick Rowley, who started his career at Andover and went on to play for a number of league clubs, as well as representing Ireland at international level

Despite their relatively low stature, a few notable players have represented Andover FC in the past. The most famous of these in recent times is Nigel Spackman, a local player who began his career for his home town before moving to AFC Bournemouth in 1980. From there, he enjoyed a successful career culminating in an English league championship win with Liverpool, and numerous Scottish league and cup winners medals with Rangers. Since retiring, he has ventured into club management as well as becoming a television football pundit.

Like Spackman, Bill Rawlings was another Andoverian who began his career at the club. He joined Southampton in 1919 where he enjoyed a successful career scoring 175 goals in 327 league appearances, making him their third all-time goalscorer behind Mick Channon and Matthew Le Tissier. He earned two England caps in 1922 against Wales and Scotland respectively. He also played for Manchester United and Port Vale.

Dick Rowley was signed in September 1922 by Andover whilst serving at nearby Tidworth army base. After a few years playing the wing for the club, he was signed by Swindon Town and went on to play for Southampton, Tottenham Hotspur and Preston North End. He won six caps for Ireland in the years between 1929 and 1931, scoring two goals against Scotland and Wales.

Another league player who started his career for Andover is James Sharp who left Andover in 2000 to play for Hartlepool United. Since then, he has had spells at Falkirk, Torquay United, Rochdale and Airdrie United in the Scottish League.

However, it has often been the case that league players have joined Andover after retiring from professional football. One of the most notable of these in modern times is Matt Crossley, who ended his career with the Lions after playing more than 100 matches for Wycombe Wanderers. After leaving Andover in 2001, Crossley later became assistant manager at Woking where he gained notoriety in December 2006 after he headbutted an opposing player who had tried to break up a fight. Maurice Evans is another former professional who, after briefly taking over as Andover's player-manager in 1967, went on to lead Reading to the Fourth Division championship, and Oxford United to Milk Cup victory.

Another such player is Nicky Banger who played for Andover in their Wessex League championship winning team of 2002, the Lions being one of a string of local non-league clubs that he played for after leaving professional football. Mel Blyth, who was on Southampton's 1976 FA Cup winning team, ended his career with Andover in 1982. His cup final team-mate David Peach also played for Andover, this time in the 1983–84 season when he scored five goals for the club. Other ex-league players who have represented Andover in the past include Colin Barrett (who joined Andover in 1981 after playing league football for Manchester City, Nottingham Forest and Swindon Town), Stuart Barfoot, Peter Brown, and former player-coach Phil Andrews.

== Other teams and activities ==
Andover's reserve team played for most of the club's history in various competitions and won the Hampshire Combination in 1998, although they did not play during the 2007–08 season. The reserve team competed in the Hampshire League 2004 from 2008 to 2011 (later to become Andover Lions). In addition to their first and reserve teams, Andover FC also ran a number of youth teams; an under-18s team competing in the North East Hampshire Youth League, and teams for other age groups ranging from under-7s to under-15s. The under-18s also competed in the FA Youth Cup.

In July 2008, the club started a community programme called "Lions in the Community" in conjunction with some of their principal sponsors (such as HSA and Stannah Lifts) and a government body to provide a range of football activities for children and schools in the immediate area. Events held included coaching sessions at schools and local sports centres, five-a-side football tournaments for girls' teams from local secondary schools, fun days and after-school clubs. As a result of this programme, the club was officially awarded FA Charter Community Club status in October 2009. Despite the dissolution of Andover F.C., the Lions in the Community programme continues its activities.
