= Bridgwater United F.C. =

Association football club in England

Coordinates: 51°7′55″N 2°59′22″W

Bridgwater United
- Full name: Bridgwater United Football Club
- Nickname: The Robins
- Founded: 1984
- Ground: Fairfax Park, Bridgwater
- Capacity: 2,500
- Chairman: Ian Davis
- Manager: Dave Pearce
- League: Western League Premier Division
- 2025–26: Western League Premier Division, 9th of 18
- Website: bridgwaterunitedfc.com
Home colours	Away colours

Bridgwater United Football Club is a football club based in Bridgwater, Somerset, England. Affiliated to the Somerset County FA, they are currently members of the Western League Premier Division and play at Fairfax Park.

== History ==
Bridgwater Association Football Club were established at a meeting in the Cross Rifles pub on 28 January 1898. They joined the Somerset Senior League later in the year won the Somerset Senior Cup in their first full season, beating Yeovil Casuals 1–0 in a replay. However, the club disbanded after four seasons in the league.

In 1903 a new Bridgwater A.F.C. was formed. They subsequently joined the Clevedon and District League for the 1905–06 season, but left after a single season to join the Weston and District League, also playing in the Highbridge League. They won Division Two of the Weston and District League in 1908–09, but finished bottom of Division One the following season and were relegated back to Division Two. This was repeated when they won Division Two again in 1911–12, but were relegated from Division One the following season. The club subsequently folded during the 1913–14 season.

In 1921 Highbridge League club Wills Athletic, the works team of the Wills Engineering company, played Bristol City in a friendly game. The level of interest in the match led to the club being transformed into Bridgwater Town during the 1921–22 season. After being rejected by the Somerset Senior League in 1923, they joined both the Mid-Somerset and West Somerset leagues. However, financial problems caused by the building works at their new ground forced them to withdraw from both leagues after a single season, they returned to local leagues, including the Taunton and District League, which they played in until 1931.

Following World War II Crown Dynamos were formed in 1946 and joined the Bridgwater and District League. They moved up to Somerset Senior League in 1947, and after finishing third in their first season, the club was transformed into Bridgwater Town Association Football Club. The first season under the new name saw the club finish as runners-up, resulting in a successful application to join Division Two of the Western League. They finished as runners-up in Division Two in 1951–52, earning promotion to Division One. The 1957–58 season saw them finish second in Division One, as well as winning the League Cup.

In 1960–61 Bridgwater reached the first round of the FA Cup for the first time. After beating Southern League club Hereford United 3–0 in the first round, they lost 2–1 at another Southern League club, Oxford United in the second. They repeated the feat the following season, beating Weston-super-Mare 1–0 in a first round replay, before losing 3–0 at home to Third Division Crystal Palace. In 1963–64 another first round appearance resulted in a 3–0 defeat at home to Third Division Luton Town; they were beaten in the same round by Reading in 1971–72. The club went on to win the league in 1980–81. After winning the League Cup the following season, they moved up to the Midland Division of the Southern League. However, after two seasons the club resigned from the league and folded due to financial problems caused by the additional travelling, falling attendances and building works at the social club.

A new Bridgwater Town was established, taking over from the defunct club's reserves in Division One of the Somerset Senior League. Although they were relegated to Division Two at the end of their first season, they were promoted back to the division at the first attempt, and won Division One in 1986–87 to earn promotion to the Premier Division. They went on to win three successive Premier Division titles in 1989–90, 1990–91 and 1991–92, and after finishing as runners-up in 1993–94, were promoted to Division One of the Western League. In 1995–96 they won Division One and were promoted to the Premier Division. After finishing as Premier Division runners-up in 2006–07, Bridgwater were promoted to Division One South and West of the Southern League. A third-place finish in 2009–10 saw them qualify for the promotion play-offs. Although the club defeated VTFC 3–0 in the semi-finals, they lost 4–3 to Cirencester Town in the final. They finished bottom of Division One South and West in 2016–17 and were relegated back to the Premier Division of the Western League.

In March 2021 Bridgwater Town merged with women's club Yeovil United, forming Bridgwater United. In 2021–22 the club won the Western League's Les Phillips Cup, defeating Cadbury Heath 1–0 in the final. They finished third in the Premier Division in 2023–24, qualifying for the promotion play-offs, in which they lost 3–1 to Falmouth Town in the semi-finals.

== Ground ==
The original Bridgwater club played at a field off the Bath Road that later became the British Cellophane factory. The 1903 club started playing at Taunton Road, the ground used by the Albion Rugby Club, before moving to Westonzoyland Road the following year. The new Bridgwater Town formed in 1921–22 played at the Malt Shovel ground until the site was used for housing in the mid-1920s, at which point they moved to a ground named Chilton Park at Crowpill. Crown Dynamos initially played at the Eastover Park, before moving to Castle Field when they were transformed into Bridgwater Town.

The modern Bridgwater Town have played at Fairfax Park on College Way since being established in 1984. The ground currently has a capacity of 2,500.

== Honours ==
- Western League
  - Champions 1967–68, 1980–81
  - Division One champions 1995–96
  - Les Phillips Cup winners 2002–03, 2004–05, 2021–22
  - Challenge Cup winners 1957–58, 1981–82
  - Alan Young Cup winners 1968–69 (shared with Glastonbury Town), 1971–72, 2006–07
- Somerset County League
  - Premier Division champions 1989–90, 1990–91, 1991–92
  - Division One champions 1986–87
- Weston & District League
  - Division Two champions 1908–09, 1911–12
- Somerset Senior Cup
  - Winners 1898–99, 1993–94, 1995–96
- Somerset Premier Cup
  - Winners 1958–59

== Records ==
- Best FA Cup performance: Second round, 1960–61, 1961–62
- Best FA Trophy performance: Third round, 1969–70, 1972–73
- Best FA Vase performance: Fifth round, 2004–05, 2022–23, 2023–24
- Record attendance: 1,112 vs Taunton Town, 26 February 1997

== See also ==
- Bridgwater United F.C. players
- Bridgwater United F.C. managers
