= Barnstaple Town F.C. =

English football club

Coordinates: 51°4′57″N 4°4′7″W

- Full name: Barnstaple Town Football Club
- Nickname: Barum
- Founded: 1904
- Ground: Mill Road, Barnstaple
- Capacity: 5,000 (250 seated)
- Chairman: Paul Larter
- Manager: Ben Potter
- League: Southern League Division One South
- 2025–26: Western League Premier Division, 1st of 18 (promoted)
Home colours	Away colours

Barnstaple Town Football Club is a football club based in Barnstaple, Devon, England. They are currently members of the Southern League Division One South and play at Mill Road.

== History ==
The club was established in 1904 as Pilton Yeo Vale, and were founder members of the North Devon League in the same year. They played in the league's first match, hosting Ilfracombe on 1 October; the visitors won 4–2 with several hundred in attendance. However, that was to be the only defeat all season in the league and club went on to win the inaugural league title. At the end of the season they adopted their current name.

After winning a second North Devon league title in 1908–09, they club switched to the Exeter & District League, where they remained until World War I. After the war they returned to the North Devon League, before rejoining the Exeter & District League. They won the league title in 1946–47 and were runners-up the following season, before joining Division Two of the Western League in 1948.

In 1949–50 Barnstaple won Division Two, earning promotion to Division One. In 1951–52 they reached the first round of the FA Cup for the first time, losing 5–2 to Folkestone in a replay. The club were league champions in 1952–53, and reached the first round of the FA Cup again in 1954–55, losing 4–1 at home to Bournemouth & Boscombe Athletic in front of a record crowd of 6,200. They reached the first round of the FA Cup for a third time in 1959–60, losing 4–0 at Exeter City.

The league was reduced to a single division in 1960, and the club reached the FA Cup first round again in 1972–73, before losing 2–0 at home to Bilston. The league expanded back to two divisions in 1976, with Barnstaple placed in the Premier Division. In 1979–80 they won their second Western League title, and finished as runners-up in the following two seasons. After finishing second-from bottom in 1990–91, Barnstaple were relegated to Division One. Three seasons later they won Division One, earning promotion back to the Premier Division.

They remained in the Premier Division until being relegated again at the end of the 2012–13 season, which saw them finish bottom of the Premier Division. However, they made an immediate return to the top division after winning Division One in 2014–15. The following season saw the club finish as runners-up in the Premier Division, earning promotion to Division One South & West of the Southern League. In 2021–22 they finished bottom of Division One South, resulting in relegation back to the Premier Division of the Western League. In 2023–24 the club finished fifth in the Premier Division and qualified for the promotion play-offs, in which they lost 3–1 to Falmouth Town in the semi-finals. A fourth-place finish in 2024–25 was followed by a 3–0 loss to Brixham in the play-off semi-finals. In 2025-26, the club finished first in the Western League, claiming the title for the 3rd time.

== Ground ==
The club have played their home games at Mill Road in Barnstaple since the late 1930s. It has a capacity of 5,000, of which 250 is seated and 1,000 covered. The record attendance at Mill Road was set in the 1954–55 season when a crowd of 6,200 watched an FA Cup first round tie against Bournemouth & Boscombe Athletic. Floodlights were installed in 1988 and inaugurated with a friendly match against Aston Villa on 15 November 1988, with the lights switched on by Villa manager Graham Taylor.

== Honours ==
- Western League
  - Champions 1952–53, 1979–80, 2025–26
  - Division One champions 1949–50, 1993–94, 2014–15
- Exeter & District League
  - Champions 1946–47
- North Devon League
  - Champions 1904–05, 1908–09
- Devon Pro Cup
  - Winners 1952–53, 1962–63, 1964–65, 1967–68, 1969–70, 1971–72, 1972–73, 1974–75, 1976–77, 1977–78, 1978–79, 1979–80, 1980–81
- Devon St Lukes Cup
  - Winners 1987–88

== Records ==
- Best FA Cup performance: First round, 1951–52, 1954–55, 1959–60, 1972–73
- Best FA Trophy performance: Second round, 1971–72
- Best FA Vase performance: Fourth round, 1994–95, 2025–26
- Record attendance: 6,200 v Bournemouth & Boscombe Athletic, FA Cup first round, 1954–55
- Biggest win: 12–1 vs Tavistock, FA Cup third qualifying round, 1954
- Heaviest defeat: 0–11 vs Odd Down, Western League, 25 April 2013
- Record transfer fee paid: £4,000 to Hungerford Town for Joe Scott
- Record transfer fee received: £6,000 from Bristol City for Ian Doyle

== See also ==
- Barnstaple Town F.C. players
- Barnstaple Town F.C. managers
