= 2023–24 FA Trophy =

2023–24 football tournament

Football Association Trophy

Tournament details
- Country: England; Wales
- Dates: Qualifying rounds: 8 September 2023 – 7 October 2023; Competition Proper: 28 October 2023 – 11 May 2024

Final positions
- Champions: Gateshead
- Runners-up: Solihull Moors

The 2023–24 FA Trophy (known for sponsorship reasons as the 2023–24 Isuzu FA Trophy) was the 55th edition of the FA Trophy, an annual football competition for teams at levels 5–8 of the English football league system.

== Format and eligibility ==
Applications to enter the 55th edition of the FA Trophy needed to be submitted by 1 April 2023. Competing clubs had to compete between step 1 and step 4 of the non-League pyramid, equivalent to levels 5 to 8 of the overall English football league system. Furthermore, grounds had to conform to grade 4 of the FA National Ground Grading.

The calendar was announced by The Football Association on 1 July 2023. The competition consists of three qualifying rounds and eight proper rounds. Teams enter at different stages depending on their position in the English pyramid. Teams at level 8 enter into the first qualifying round and must win 11 matches to become champions. Level 7 teams enter into the third qualifying round and must win 9 matches to become champions. Level 6 teams enter into the second round proper and must win 7 matches to become champions. Level 5 teams enter into the third round proper and must win 6 matches to become champions.

All rounds are single-match knockout format, with the winner decided by penalties if the match was drawn after 90 minutes, apart from the Final where the winner was decided by extra-time and penalties if the match is drawn. This is the same format as the 2020–21, 2021–22 and 2022–23 seasons which broke from previous seasons that used replays and two-legged semi-finals. The 2019–20 season was scheduled to play two-legged semi-finals but due to their delay by the COVID-19 pandemic in the United Kingdom were shifted to a single match. All other previous editions played to the same format of replays and two-legged semi-finals.

FC Halifax Town were the reigning champions for the 2023–24 season, having defeated Gateshead in the 2023 FA Trophy final at Wembley Stadium.

Round	Main Date	Number of Fixtures	Clubs Remaining	New Entries This Round	Losing Club	Winning Club
First round qualifying	9 September 2023	80 (incl. 1 bye)	319 → 240	159 (incl. 1 bye)	£400	£1,500
Second round qualifying	23 September 2023	40	240 → 200	none	£575	£2,250
Third round qualifying	7 October 2023	64	200 → 136	88	£625	£2,450
First round proper	28 October 2023	32	136 → 104	none	£775	£3,000
Second round proper	18 November 2023	40	104 → 64	48	£1,000	£3,750
Third round proper	9 December 2023	32	64 → 32	24	£1,250	£4,500
Fourth round proper	13 January 2024	16	32 → 16	none	£1,500	£5,250
Fifth round proper	10 February 2024	8	16 → 8	none	£1,750	£6,000
Quarter-finals	9 March 2024	4	8 → 4	none	£2,000	£7,500
Semi-finals	6 April 2024	2	4 → 2	none	£5,000	£15,000
Final	11 May 2024	1	2 → 1	none	£30,000	£60,000

== First round qualifying ==
The draw for the first qualifying round was made on 8 July 2023.

The first round of qualifying took place on the weekend of 8–10 September and involved 158 teams in 79 matches. 159 teams, all from Level 8 of the English football league system, were drawn into 79 fixtures, with the leftover team, Hinckley LR, receiving a bye.

Tie	Home team (level)	Score	Away team (level)	Att.
Friday 8 September 2023
34	Bowers & Pitsea (8)	3–1	Gorleston (8)	153
66	Uxbridge (8)	1–2	Sevenoaks Town (8)	121
Match played at Slough Town.
Saturday 9 September 2023
1	Brighouse Town (8)	1–1 (6–5 p)	Hebburn Town (8)	112
2	Liversedge (8)	0–3	Nantwich Town (8)	247
3	North Ferriby (8)	2–1	Ossett United (8)	472
4	Avro (8)	2–1	Winterton Rangers (8)	71
5	Mossley (8)	0–2	Vauxhall Motors (8)	397
6	Widnes (8)	0–1	Clitheroe (8)	136
7	Trafford (8)	1–2	Stalybridge Celtic (8)	595
8	Prescot Cables (8)	4–0	Bridlington Town (8)	514
9	Newton Aycliffe (8)	1–3	Stocksbridge Park Steels (8)	192
11	Dunston (8)	3–0	Ashington (8)	314
12	Bootle (8)	6–3	Consett (8)	309
13	Runcorn Linnets (8)	0–0 (3–4 p)	Witton Albion (8)	663
14	Stockton Town (8)	3–1	Pontefract Collieries (8)	391
15	Sporting Khalsa (8)	1–0	Grimsby Borough (8)	145
16	Quorn (8)	4–0	Coventry Sphinx (8)	185
17	Bedworth United (8)	1–5	Leek Town (8)	167
18	Anstey Nomads (8)	2–0	Corby Town (8)	228
19	Gresley Rovers (8)	0–6	Kidsgrove Athletic (8)	238
20	Belper Town (8)	2–0	Newcastle Town (8)	398
21	Sutton Coldfield Town (8)	0–2	Boldmere St. Michaels (8)	295
22	Rugby Town (8)	1–5	Grantham Town (8)	247
23	Hednesford Town (8)	0–3	Walsall Wood (8)	654
24	Harborough Town (8)	2–1	Lye Town	214
25	Sheffield (8)	1–1 (4–3 p)	Spalding United (8)	382
26	Hanley Town (8)	2–0	Cleethorpes Town (8)	227
27	Chasetown (8)	5–1	Shepshed Dynamo (8)	129
28	Loughborough Dynamo (8)	1–1 (5–4 p)	AFC Rushden & Diamonds (8)	195
29	Coleshill Town (8)	1–5	Carlton Town (8)	110
30	Leighton Town (8)	3–1	Kempston Rovers (8)	242
31	Felixstowe & Walton United (8)	2–0	Brentwood Town (8)	371
32	Hertford Town (8)	3–2	Grays Athletic (8)	245
33	AFC Dunstable (8)	W/O	East Thurrock United (8)	
AFC Dunstable awarded a Walkover following the liquidation of East Thurrock United on 1 September 2023.
35	Witham Town (8)	3–0	Maldon & Tiptree (8)	154
36	Lowestoft Town (8)	5–3	New Salamis (8)	332
38	Biggleswade (8)	3–1	Stowmarket Town (8)	101
39	Redbridge (8)	1–0	Stotfold (8)	63
40	Hadley (8)	4–1	Ware (8)	148

Tie	Home team (level)	Score	Away team (level)	Att.
41	Aylesbury United (8)	2–3	Bedford Town (8)	148
42	Kings Langley (8)	1–2	Cambridge City (8)	177
43	Welwyn Garden City (8)	3–5	Basildon United (8)	95
44	Wroxham	2–4	Brightlingsea Regent (8)	210
45	Waltham Abbey (8)	6–2	Ipswich Wanderers (8)	130
46	Heybridge Swifts (8)	3–2	Barton Rovers (8)	161
47	Biggleswade Town (8)	2–3	Bury Town (8)	159
48	Beckenham Town (8)	1–5	Three Bridges	115
49	Horndean (8)	2–3	Ascot United (8)	110
50	Ramsgate (8)	3–0	Northwood (8)	416
51	Westfield (8)	4–1	Littlehampton Town (8)	104
52	Phoenix Sports (8)	1–1 (4–5 p)	Metropolitan Police (8)	90
53	Thame United (8)	0–5	Badshot Lea (8)	96
54	Raynes Park Vale (8)	0–1	Marlow (8)	144
55	Burgess Hill Town (8)	1–3	Hythe Town (8)	260
56	East Grinstead Town (8)	0–1	Sheppey United (8)	152
57	Chipstead (8)	2–4	Lancing (8)	120
58	Merstham (8)	0–3	Sutton Common Rovers (8)	116
59	South Park Reigate (8)	2–1	Erith & Belvedere (8)	69
60	Southall (8)	2–1	Chichester City (8)	61
61	Herne Bay (8)	1–6	Leatherhead (8)	226
62	Hanworth Villa (8)	1–1 (2–4 p)	Chertsey Town (8)	281
63	Sittingbourne (8)	2–1	Ashford Town (8)	96
65	Broadbridge Heath (8)	0–2	Cray Valley Paper Mills (8)	120
67	Corinthian Casuals (8)	0–2	Hartley Wintney (8)	188
68	Hamworthy United (8)	3–0	Melksham Town (8)	68
69	Frome Town (8)	3–1	Cirencester Town (8)	234
70	Yate Town (8)	0–2	Tavistock (8)	216
71	Kidlington (8)	2–0	North Leigh (8)	136
72	Westbury United (8)	2–5	Bemerton Heath Harlequins (8)	67
Match played at Melksham Town.
73	Evesham United (8)	1–1 (7–8 p)	Bashley (8)	156
74	Bishop's Cleeve (8)	6–1	Paulton Rovers (8)	72
75	Larkhall Athletic (8)	2–0	Willand Rovers (8)	115
76	Thatcham Town (8)	2–2 (1–3 p)	Bristol Manor Farm (8)	107
77	Exmouth Town (8)	3–3 (5–3 p)	Wimborne Town (8)	230
78	Cribbs (8)	3–2	Bideford (8)	117
79	Malvern Town (8)	2–4	Mousehole (8)	298
Sunday 10 September 2023
37	Enfield (8)	W/O	Walthamstow (8)	
10	City of Liverpool (8)	3–1	1874 Northwich (8)	324
64	Ashford United (8)	7–1	Binfield (8)	90
Match played at Chatham Town.

== Second round qualifying ==
The draw for the second qualifying round was also made on 8 July 2023.

This round consisted of the 79 winners from the previous round alongside Hinckley LR who received a bye in the previous round.

Tie	Home team (level)	Score	Away team (level)	Att.
Saturday 23 September 2023
1	Avro (8)	0–0 (4–2 p)	Stalybridge Celtic (8)	164
2	City of Liverpool (8)	2–1	Witton Albion (8)	251
3	Nantwich Town (8)	2–1	Dunston (8)	307
4	Stockton Town (8)	0–2	Bootle (8)	365
5	Vauxhall Motors (8)	0–1	Stocksbridge Park Steels (8)	152
6	Brighouse Town (8)	2–2 (4–1 p)	Clitheroe (8)	190
7	North Ferriby (8)	2–2 (6–5 p)	Prescot Cables (8)	453
8	Hanley Town (8)	2–1	Sheffield (8)	176
9	Kidsgrove Athletic (8)	2–4	Sporting Khalsa (8)	233
10	Quorn (8)	4–2	Leek Town (8)	206
11	Belper Town (8)	1–2	Walsall Wood (8)	368
12	Boldmere St. Michaels (8)	2–1	Grantham Town (8)	143
13	Carlton Town (8)	2–1	Chasetown (8)	128
14	Anstey Nomads (8)	2–2 (4–2 p)	Loughborough Dynamo (8)	129
15	Hinckley Leicester Road F.C. (8)	0–0 (5–6 p)	Harborough Town (8)	138
17	Felixstowe & Walton United (8)	6–3	Hertford Town (8)	225
18	Biggleswade (8)	2–1	Hadley (8)	136
19	Bury Town F.C. (8)	1–1 (3–0 p)	Walthamstow (8)	454
20	AFC Dunstable (8)	2–3	Brightlingsea Regent (8)	113
22	Witham Town (8)	2–3	Redbridge (8)	104

Tie	Home team (level)	Score	Away team (level)	Att.
23	Waltham Abbey (8)	1–5	Heybridge Swifts (8)	160
24	Basildon United (8)	0–4	Lowestoft Town (8)	92
25	South Park Reigate (8)	2–1	Three Bridges (8)	116
26	Cray Valley Paper Mills (8)	2–0	Hartley Wintney (8)	116
27	Ramsgate (8)	3–1	Sevenoaks Town (8)	404
28	Metropolitan Police (8)	1–1 (4–5 p)	Ashford United (8)	108
29	Badshot Lea (8)	5–3	Sutton Common Rovers (8)	91
30	Ascot United (8)	6–2	Lancing (8)	162
31	Sheppey United (8)	2–1	Sittingbourne (8)	550
32	Southall (8)	1–3	Leatherhead (8)	114
33	Westfield (8)	2–1	Marlow (8)	91
34	Chertsey Town (8)	2–4	Hythe Town (8)	410
35	Mousehole (8)	3–0	Tavistock (8)	132
36	Bishop's Cleeve (8)	3–2	Bristol Manor Farm (8)	94
37	Kidlington (8)	2–1	Exmouth Town (8)	91
38	Cribbs (8)	3–3 (4–2 p)	Bashley (8)	96
39	Bemerton Heath Harlequins (8)	0–3	Frome Town (8)	109
Sunday 24 September 2023
16	Bowers & Pitsea (8)	0–0 (3–5 p)	Bedford Town (8)	105
21	Cambridge City (8)	0–2	Leighton Town (8)	173
40	Hamworthy United (8)	1–2	Larkhall Athletic (8)	72

== Third round qualifying ==
The draw for the third qualifying round was made on 25 September 2023. The 40 winners from the previous round were joined by 88 teams from the seventh level.

Tie	Home team (level)	Score	Away team (level)	Att.
Friday 6 October 2023
1	Avro (8)	4–0	Warrington Rylands (7)	200
42	Potters Bar Town (7)	4–1	Berkhamsted (7)	217
Saturday 7 October 2023
2	Bootle (8)	0–2	Bamber Bridge (7)	302
3	North Ferriby (8)	4–0	Atherton Collieries (7)	478
4	Bradford (Park Avenue) (7)	0–0 (5–6 p)	Nantwich Town (8)	256
5	Lancaster City (7)	0–0 (1–3 p)	City of Liverpool (8)	326
6	Hanley Town (8)	0–1	Macclesfield (7)	426
7	Morpeth Town (7)	1–4	FC United of Manchester (7)	418
8	Ashton United (7)	1–1 (4–3 p)	Brighouse Town (8)	178
9	Workington AFC (7)	1–3	Hyde United (7)	580
10	Radcliffe (7)	3–2	Whitby Town (7)	735
11	Gainsborough Trinity (7)	1–3	Guiseley (7)	342
12	Worksop Town (7)	2–1	Stocksbridge Park Steels (8)	383
13	Marske United (7)	2–4	Marine (7)	252
14	Quorn (8)	2–0	AFC Telford United (7)	305
15	Long Eaton United (7)	1–4	Stourbridge (7)	267
16	Stratford Town (7)	1–0	Basford United (7)	357
17	Redditch United (7)	2–1	Leamington (7)	408
18	Harborough Town (8)	2–1	Biggleswade (8)	126
19	Barwell (7)	2–2 (2–4 p)	Mickleover (7)	189
20	St Ives Town (7)	3–2	Kettering Town (7)	351
21	Bromsgrove Sporting (7)	0–2	Halesowen Town (7)	947
22	Anstey Nomads (8)	0–1	Alvechurch (7)	172
23	Royston Town (7)	1–3	Coalville Town (7)	275
24	Boldmere St Michaels (8)	0–3	Leighton Town (8)	148
25	Stafford Rangers (7)	3–2	Sporting Khalsa (8)	485
26	Hitchin Town (7)	2–3	Stamford (7)	362
27	Matlock Town (7)	1–0	Bedford Town (8)	595
28	Ilkeston Town (7)	2–3	Walsall Wood (8)	556
29	Nuneaton Borough (7)	1–0	Carlton Town (8)	239
30	Carshalton Athletic (7)	1–2	Cray Valley Paper Mills (8)	249

Tie	Home team (level)	Score	Away team (level)	Att.
31	Hendon (7)	3–1	AFC Sudbury (7)	160
32	Westfield (8)	3–1	Leatherhead (8)	231
33	Leiston (7)	1–1 (9–8 p)	Hornchurch (7)	163
34	Walton & Hersham (7)	3–1	Canvey Island (7)	464
35	Chesham United (7)	4–3	Enfield Town (7)	523
36	Bognor Regis Town (7)	3–1	Hayes & Yeading United (7)	513
37	Horsham (7)	2–0	Brightlingsea Regent (8)	542
38	Harrow Borough (7)	1–0	Margate (7)	126
39	Cheshunt (7)	0–1	Dulwich Hamlet (7)	292
40	Badshot Lea (8)	0–0 (2–4 p)	Redbridge (8)	171
41	Beaconsfield Town (7)	3–0	Ashford United (8)	85
43	Needham Market (7)	0–1	Cray Wanderers (7)	187
44	Hanwell Town (7)	1–2	Bracknell Town (7)	182
45	Heybridge Swifts (8)	1–2	Chatham Town (7)	220
46	Lewes (7)	4–1	Lowestoft Town (8)	578
47	South Park Reigate (8)	2–0	Hashtag United (7)	184
48	Concord Rangers (7)	2–3	Hythe Town (8)	129
49	Wingate & Finchley (7)	0–1	Bury Town (8)	128
50	Ramsgate (8)	4–1	Sheppey United (8)	520
51	Hastings United (7)	1–2	Kingstonian (7)	627
52	Billericay Town (7)	4–3	Felixstowe & Walton United (8)	527
53	Whitehawk (7)	2–0	Ascot United (8)	357
54	Folkestone Invicta (7)	2–2 (3–5 p)	Haringey Borough (7)	361
55	Didcot Town (7)	1–2	Cribbs (8)	201
56	Poole Town (7)	3–1	Sholing (7)	407
57	Basingstoke Town (7)	3–0	Kidlington (8)	405
58	Bishop's Cleeve (8)	1–5	Frome Town (8)	101
59	Swindon Supermarine (7)	3–1	Tiverton Town (7)	211
60	Larkhall Athletic (8)	2–0	Mousehole (8)	175
61	Gosport Borough (7)	2–2 (3–1 p)	Salisbury (7)	453
62	Merthyr Town (7)	3–1	Dorchester Town (7)	443
63	AFC Totton (7)	2–1	Plymouth Parkway (7)	376
64	Winchester City (7)	3–5	Hungerford Town (7)	275

== First round proper ==
The draw for the First round proper was made on 9 October 2023 consisting of the 64 winners from the previous round.

Tie	Home team (level)	Score	Away team (level)	Att.
Friday 27 October 2023
30	Frome Town (8)	1–0	Cribbs (8)	408
Saturday 28 October 2023
1	Macclesfield (7)	4–1	Halesowen Town (7)	1,584
2	Nantwich Town (8)	0–0 (4–2 p)	Stratford Town (7)	279
3	Redditch United (7)	3–0	Ashton United (7)	243
4	Alvechurch (7)	0–1	Coalville Town (7)	274
5	Nuneaton Borough (7)	2–0	Hyde United (7)	305
Match played at Hyde United.
6	Walsall Wood (8)	1–1 (6–5 p)	Guiseley (7)	243
7	Worksop Town (7)	0–5	Mickleover (7)	488
8	Stourbridge (7)	5–1	Bamber Bridge (7)	460
9	FC United of Manchester (7)	2–2 (4–5 p)	Radcliffe (7)	1,390
10	Stafford Rangers (7)	5–3	Quorn (8)	507
11	St Ives Town (7)	3–1	Marine (7)	279
12	North Ferriby (8)	0–3	Matlock Town (7)	442
13	City Of Liverpool (8)	1–0	Stamford (7)	282
14	Harborough Town (8)	0–0 (3–0 p)	Avro (8)	262
15	South Park (Reigate) (8)	2–1	Leighton Town (8)	139
16	Chatham Town (7)	0–2	Cray Valley Paper Mills (8)	420
17	Harrow Borough (7)	1–2	Beaconsfield Town (7)	133
18	Hythe Town (8)	P–P	Ramsgate (8)	
20	Haringey Borough (7)	1–2	Redbridge (8)	171

Tie	Home team (level)	Score	Away team (level)	Att.
21	Billericay Town (7)	5–0	Bury Town (8)	518
22	Dulwich Hamlet (7)	0–2	Lewes (7)	2,745
23	Hendon (7)	2–1	Walton & Hersham (7)	133
24	Potters Bar Town (7)	0–1	Leiston (7)	131
25	Cray Wanderers (7)	3–3 (5–3 p)	Chesham United (7)	171
26	Swindon Supermarine (7)	0–3	Basingstoke Town (7)	251
27	AFC Totton (7)	P–P	Merthyr Town (7)	
28	Larkhall Athletic (8)	1–2	Horsham (7)	206
29	Westfield (8)	1–3	Hungerford Town (7)	160
31	Bognor Regis Town (7)	P–P	Gosport Borough (7)	
32	Poole Town (7)	P–P	Bracknell Town (7)	
Sunday 29 October 2023
19	Kingstonian (7)	P–P	Whitehawk (7)	
Monday 30 October 2023
31	Bognor Regis Town (7)	3–0	Gosport Borough (7)	445
Tuesday 31 October 2023
18	Hythe Town (8)	3–1	Ramsgate (8)	205
27	AFC Totton (7)	2–1	Merthyr Town (7)	344
32	Poole Town (7)	P–P	Bracknell Town (7)	
Wednesday 1 November 2023
19	Kingstonian (7)	0–4	Whitehawk (7)	118
Tuesday 7 November 2023
32	Poole Town (7)	2–2 (1–4 p)	Bracknell Town (7)	175

== Second round proper ==
The draw for the second round was made on 30 October 2023, seeing the 48 teams from step two joining the 32 winners from the previous round.

Tie	Home team (level)	Score	Away team (level)	Att.
Saturday 18 November 2023
1	Buxton (6)	1–3	City of Liverpool (8)	575
2	Scunthorpe United (6)	2–0	Darlington (6)	1,977
3	Alfreton Town (6)	2–4	Macclesfield (7)	613
4	Chorley (6)	1–0	Scarborough Athletic (6)	1,086
5	Curzon Ashton (6)	2–0	Matlock Town (7)	296
6	Spennymoor Town (6)	1–3	Mickleover (7)	667
7	Warrington Town (6)	1–3	Blyth Spartans (6)	930
8	Farsley Celtic (6)	2–4	Radcliffe (7)	372
9	Nantwich Town (8)	0–0 (4–2 p)	Chester (6)	1,414
10	Southport (6)	4–0	South Shields (6)	761
11	Banbury United (6)	2–4	Nuneaton Borough (7)	836
12	Gloucester City (6)	3–0	Braintree Town (6)	446
13	Coalville Town (7)	1–1 (7–6 p)	Boston United (6)	594
14	Stafford Rangers (7)	0–0 (2–4 p)	Brackley Town (6)	582
15	Stourbridge (7)	2–1	King's Lynn Town (6)	686
16	Leiston (7)	P–P	Peterborough Sports (6)	
17	Redditch United (7)	2–1	Rushall Olympic (6)	402
18	Bishop's Stortford (6)	3–1	St Albans City (6)	515
19	Hereford (6)	4–1	Redbridge (8)	1,332
20	Aveley (6)	2–1	St Ives Town (7)	272
21	Harborough Town (8)	0–2	Chelmsford City (6)	653
22	Hemel Hempstead Town (6)	1–1 (3–5 p)	Walsall Wood (8)	452

Tie	Home team (level)	Score	Away team (level)	Att.
23	Billericay Town (7)	3–1	Tamworth (6)	802
24	Bracknell Town (7)	0–3	Horsham (7)	463
25	AFC Totton (7)	2–1	Havant & Waterlooville (6)	689
26	Hendon (7)	2–0	Eastbourne Borough (6)	313
27	Bognor Regis Town (7)	P–P	South Park (Reigate) (8)	
28	Torquay United (6)	2–1	Yeovil Town (6)	1,740
29	Chippenham Town (6)	1–1 (3–2 p)	Basingstoke Town (7)	364
30	Whitehawk (7)	3–1	Lewes (7)	723
31	Frome Town (8)	2–2 (4–3 p)	Worthing (6)	597
32	Dover Athletic (6)	4–4 (1–4 p)	Weymouth (6)	338
33	Weston-super-Mare (6)	4–1	Cray Wanderers (7)	452
34	Slough Town (6)	2–1	Farnborough (6)	631
35	Hythe Town (8)	0–0 (3–1 p)	Tonbridge Angels (6)	385
36	Bath City (6)	1–0	Beaconsfield Town (7)	1,000
37	Hungerford Town (7)	2–0	Truro City (6)	342
38	Welling United (6)	P–P	Taunton Town (6)	
39	Dartford (6)	0–1	Maidstone United (6)	1,187
40	Cray Valley Paper Mills (8)	1–5	Hampton & Richmond Borough (6)	205
Tuesday 21 November 2023
16	Leiston (7)	1–4	Peterborough Sports (6)	116
38	Welling United (6)	2–2 (8–7 p)	Taunton Town (6)	258
Wednesday 22 November 2023
27	Bognor Regis Town (7)	1–4	South Park (Reigate) (8)	459

== Third round proper ==
The draw for the third round was made on 20 November 2023 and saw the 24 clubs from the National League join the 40 winners from the previous round.

Tie	Home team (level)	Score	Away team (level)	Att.
Friday 8 December 2023
2	Scunthorpe United (6)	0–2	Solihull Moors (5)	1,899
Saturday 9 December 2023
1	Curzon Ashton (6)	0–2	Macclesfield (7)	589
3	Kidderminster Harriers (5)	4–1	Stourbridge (7)	2,159
4	Oldham Athletic (5)	3–3 (4–2 p)	Mickleover (7)	1,662
5	Nantwich Town (8)	3–2	York City (5)	905
6	FC Halifax Town (5)	P–P	Altrincham (5)	
7	Walsall Wood (8)	P–P	Coalville Town (7)	
8	Nuneaton Borough (7)	2–2 (5–6 p)	AFC Fylde (5)	882
9	Chesterfield (5)	6–1	Southport (6)	2,156
10	City of Liverpool (8)	1–5	Hartlepool United (5)	678
11	Chorley (6)	2–0	Blyth Spartans (6)	621
12	Radcliffe (7)	P–P	Redditch United (7)	
13	Rochdale (5)	P–P	Gateshead (5)	
14	Horsham (7)	2–0	AFC Totton (7)	644
15	Bath City (6)	1–0	Boreham Wood (5)	665
16	Southend United (5)	2–2 (2–4 p)	Hampton & Richmond Borough (6)	2,185
17	Dorking Wanderers (5)	3–0	Maidenhead United (5)	759
18	Bromley (5)	1–0	Slough Town (6)	1,041
19	Aveley (6)	1–1 (8–7 p)	Hungerford Town (7)	250
20	Hereford (6)	1–0	South Park (Reigate) (8)	1,001
21	Dagenham & Redbridge (5)	1–1 (2–4 p)	Peterborough Sports (6)	488
22	Frome Town (8)	1–4	Torquay United (6)	1,305
23	Hythe Town (7)	P–P	Whitehawk (7)	

Tie	Home team (level)	Score	Away team (level)	Att.
24	Barnet (5)	4–0	Maidstone United (6)	636
25	Welling United (6)	1–1 (4–3 p)	Brackley Town (6)	318
26	Ebbsfleet United (5)	1–1 (3–5 p)	Bishop's Stortford (6)	586
27	Weston-super-Mare (6)	P–P	Woking (5)	
28	Eastleigh (5)	2–2 (4–5 p)	Aldershot Town (5)	1,344
29	Oxford City (5)	0–1	Chelmsford City (6)	446
30	Wealdstone (5)	P–P	Billericay Town (7)	
31	Hendon (7)	2–0	Weymouth (6)	300
32	Chippenham Town (6)	5–3	Gloucester City (6)	464
Tuesday 12 December 2023
6	FC Halifax Town (5)	0–0 (5–6 p)	Altrincham (5)	665
7	Walsall Wood (8)	P–P	Coalville Town (7)	
12	Radcliffe (7)	4–0	Redditch United (7)	413
13	Rochdale (5)	1–5	Gateshead (5)	1,107
23	Hythe Town (7)	3–2	Whitehawk (7)	166
27	Weston-super-Mare (6)	3–2	Woking (5)	326
30	Wealdstone (5)	P–P	Billericay Town (7)	
Tuesday 19 December 2023
7	Walsall Wood (8)	P–P	Coalville Town (7)	
30	Wealdstone (5)	P–P	Billericay Town (7)	
Wednesday 20 December 2023
30	Wealdstone (5)	4–1	Billericay Town (7)	310
Match played at Billericay Town.
Tuesday 9 January 2024
7	Walsall Wood (8)	0–2	Coalville Town (7)	263
Match played at Coalville Town.

== Fourth round proper ==
The draw for the fourth round was made on 11 December 2023 containing the 32 winners from the previous round.

Tie	Home team (level)	Score	Away team (level)	Att.
Saturday 13 January 2024
1	Bishop's Stortford (6)	6–1	Aldershot Town (5)	837
2	Hythe Town (8)	1–2	Chorley (6)	730
3	Gateshead (5)	2–2 (4–3 p)	Weston-super-Mare (6)	566
4	Welling United (6)	2–0	Chesterfield (5)	452
5	Hereford (6)	2–0	Torquay United (6)	2,264
6	Hartlepool United (5)	0–0 (2–4 p)	Hampton & Richmond Borough (6)	2,129
7	Bath City (6)	0–0 (3–4 p)	Coalville Town (7)	965
8	Solihull Moors (5)	5–1	Nantwich Town (8)	808

Tie	Home team (level)	Score	Away team (level)	Att.
9	Kidderminster Harriers (5)	0–0 (4–2 p)	Altrincham (5)	1,651
10	Macclesfield (7)	5–0	Dorking Wanderers (5)	1,833
11	Aveley (6)	1–0	AFC Fylde (5)	319
12	Oldham Athletic (5)	1–2	Hendon (7)	2,819
13	Chelmsford City (6)	0–1	Wealdstone (5)	865
14	Radcliffe (7)	1–2	Barnet (5)	1,408
15	Horsham (7)	0–3	Peterborough Sports (6)	957
16	Bromley (5)	1–1 (4–2 p)	Chippenham Town (6)	1,525

== Fifth round proper ==
The draw for the fifth round was made on 15 January 2024.

Tie	Home team (level)	Score	Away team (level)	Att.
Saturday 10 February 2024
1	Welling United (6)	0–3	Barnet (5)	652
2	Bromley (5)	2–0	Aveley (6)	1,311
3	Hereford (6)	0–1	Gateshead (5)	2,263
4	Peterborough Sports (6)	1–0	Kidderminster Harriers (5)	608
6	Chorley (6)	1–3	Solihull Moors (5)	2,087
8	Hampton & Richmond Borough (6)	0–2	Macclesfield (7)	1,480
Tuesday 20 February 2024
5	Wealdstone (5)	4–0	Hendon (7)	711
Match played at Hendon.
7	Bishop's Stortford (6)	0–3	Coalville Town (7)	203

== Quarter-finals ==
The draw for the quarter-finals was made on 12 February 2024.

Tie	Home team (level)	Score	Away team (level)	Att.
Saturday 9 March 2024
1	Gateshead (5)	3–2	Peterborough Sports (6)	794
2	Bromley (5)	2–0	Barnet (5)	2,557
3	Wealdstone (5)	1–1 (3–4 p)	Solihull Moors (5)	1,018
4	Macclesfield (7)	3–0	Coalville Town (7)	2,510

== Semi-finals ==
The draw for the semi-finals was made on 11 March 2024.

6 April 2024
15:00 BST

Gateshead (5)	2–1	Macclesfield (7)
Worman 5'; Whelan 25'	Report	Drummond 47'

Gateshead International Stadium, Gateshead
Attendance: 3,031

6 April 2024
15:00 BST

Bromley (5)	1–2	Solihull Moors (5)
Krauhaus 60'	Report	Whitmore 36', 74'

Hayes Lane, Bromley
Attendance: 4,038

== Final ==
11 May 2024
16:15

Gateshead(5)	2–2 (a.e.t.)	Solihull Moors(5)
Booty 45+3'; Brown 110'	Report	Beck 69', 101' (pen.)
Penalties
Booty (penalty missed); Dinanga (penalty scored); Francis (penalty missed); Olley (penalty scored); Storey (penalty scored); Evans (penalty scored); Allan (penalty missed); Brown (penalty scored)	5–4	(penalty scored) Warburton; (penalty missed) Shade; (penalty missed) Clarke; (penalty scored) Beck; (penalty scored) Newton; (penalty scored) Mafuta; (penalty missed) Labadie; (penalty missed) Whitmore

Wembley Stadium
Attendance: 19,964
Referee: Sam Allison
