= 2011–12 Western Football League =

Western Football League
- Season: 2011–12

The 2011–12 Western Football League season (known as the 2011–12 Toolstation Western Football League for sponsorship reasons) was the 110th in the history of the Western Football League, a football competition in England. Teams were divided into two divisions; the Premier and the First.

The league champions for the first time in their history were Merthyr Town, who were promoted to the Southern League. The champions of Division One were Cadbury Heath.

== Premier Division ==
The Premier Division featured two new clubs in a league of 18, reduced from 19 the previous season after the relegation of Wellington and Welton Rovers, and the late resignation of Dawlish Town:

- Bridport, third in the First Division.
- Merthyr Town, champions of the First Division.

Dawlish Town withdrew from the league on 22 July 2011, after the fixtures for the new season had been announced. A new fixture list was subsequently compiled.

=== League table ===
Pos	Team	Pld	W	D	L	GF	GA	GD	Pts	Promotion or relegation
1	Merthyr Town (C, P)	34	22	9	3	96	32	+64	75	Promotion to Southern League Division One S&W
2	Bitton	34	23	4	7	74	35	+39	73	
3	Larkhall Athletic	34	21	4	9	67	29	+38	67	
4	Hallen	34	19	8	7	59	41	+18	65	
5	Willand Rovers	34	18	7	9	62	37	+25	61	
6	Bishop Sutton	34	16	10	8	60	37	+23	58	
7	Brislington	34	14	11	9	49	34	+15	53	
8	Bristol Manor Farm	34	13	8	13	63	57	+6	47	
9	Odd Down	34	13	9	12	54	48	+6	47 (Note: Odd Down had one point deducted for fielding an ineligible player against Merthyr Town on 8 October 2011.)	
10	Street	34	14	4	16	56	58	−2	46	
11	Ilfracombe Town	34	12	8	14	52	52	0	44	
12	Wells City	34	13	5	16	54	66	−12	44	
13	Longwell Green Sports	34	10	8	16	30	47	−17	38	
14	Bridport	34	10	4	20	42	81	−39	34	
15	Barnstaple Town	34	9	5	20	45	66	−21	32	
16	Radstock Town	34	8	3	23	33	74	−41	27	
17	Sherborne Town (R)	34	8	3	23	36	91	−55	27	Relegation to the First Division
18	Corsham Town (R)	34	6	4	24	21	68	−47	22	Relegation to the First Division

Updated to match(es) played on 8 May 2012. Source:
Rules for classification: 1) points; 2) goal difference; 3) number of goals scored.
(C) Champions; (P) Promoted; (R) Relegated

== First Division ==
The First Division featured two new clubs in a league of 19, after Merthyr Town and Bridport were promoted to the Premier Division:

- Wellington, relegated from the Premier Division.
- Welton Rovers, relegated from the Premier Division.

=== League table ===
Pos	Team	Pld	W	D	L	GF	GA	GD	Pts	Promotion
1	Cadbury Heath (C, P)	36	25	9	2	88	32	+56	84	Promotion to the Premier Division
2	Melksham Town (P)	36	24	6	6	77	42	+35	78	Promotion to the Premier Division
3	Gillingham Town (P)	36	22	6	8	94	52	+42	72	Promotion to the Premier Division
4	Calne Town	36	21	7	8	60	34	+26	70	
5	Bradford Town	36	16	10	10	72	44	+28	58	
6	Chard Town	36	15	7	14	62	54	+8	52	
7	Welton Rovers	36	14	8	14	61	57	+4	49 (Note: Welton Rovers had one point deducted for fielding an ineligible player against Portishead Town on 13 August 2011.)	
8	Roman Glass St George	36	13	10	13	48	51	−3	49	
9	Almondsbury UWE	36	14	6	16	70	67	+3	48	
10	Hengrove Athletic	36	12	10	14	53	59	−6	45 (Note: Hengrove Athletic had one point deducted for fielding an ineligible player against Portishead Town on 3 December 2011.)	
11	Oldland Abbotonians	36	11	11	14	52	53	−1	44	
12	Portishead Town	36	12	8	16	48	61	−13	44	
13	Keynsham Town	36	11	13	12	52	59	−7	43 (Note: Keynsham Town had three points deducted for fielding an ineligible player against Shepton Mallet on 5 November 2011.)	
14	Elmore	36	12	6	18	51	64	−13	42	
15	Shrewton United	36	10	9	17	63	88	−25	39	
16	Shepton Mallet	36	9	10	17	59	84	−25	37	
17	Westbury United	36	10	5	21	48	65	−17	35	
18	Wellington	36	9	5	22	40	84	−44	32	
19	Devizes Town	36	5	8	23	34	82	−48	23	

Updated to match(es) played on 7 May 2012. Source:
Rules for classification: 1) points; 2) goal difference; 3) number of goals scored.
(C) Champions; (P) Promoted
