= 2009–10 Western Football League =

Western Football League
- Season: 2009–10

The 2009–10 Western Football League season (known as the 2009–10 Toolstation Western Football League for sponsorship reasons) was the 108th in the history of the Western Football League, a football competition in England. Teams were divided into two divisions; the Premier and the First.

The league champions for the tenth time in their history were Bideford, who took promotion to the Southern League. The champions of Division One were Wells City.

== Premier Division ==
The Premier Division featured two new clubs in a league of 20 teams, reduced from 21 the previous season after Frome Town were promoted to the Southern League, and Chard Town and Devizes Town were relegated to the First Division:

- Larkhall Athletic, champions of the First Division.
- Longwell Green Sports, runners up in the First Division.

=== Final table ===
Pos	Team	Pld	W	D	L	GF	GA	GD	Pts	Promotion or relegation
1	Bideford (C, P)	38	27	6	5	93	37	+56	87	Promotion to Southern League Division One S&W
2	Willand Rovers	38	24	11	3	79	30	+49	83	
3	Ilfracombe Town	38	21	10	7	64	45	+19	73	
4	Bishop Sutton	38	19	6	13	69	55	+14	63	
5	Welton Rovers	38	16	13	9	66	52	+14	61	
6	Street	38	19	4	15	65	62	+3	61	
7	Bristol Manor Farm	38	16	11	11	70	55	+15	59	
8	Bitton	38	16	8	14	58	55	+3	56	
9	Brislington	38	14	9	15	44	48	−4	51	
10	Dawlish Town	38	14	9	15	57	63	−6	51	
11	Longwell Green Sports	38	13	10	15	50	63	−13	49	
12	Hallen	38	13	8	17	52	55	−3	47	
13	Wellington	38	13	7	18	63	72	−9	46	
14	Larkhall Athletic	38	12	10	16	61	72	−11	46	
15	Barnstaple Town	38	13	6	19	67	76	−9	45	
16	Radstock Town	38	12	5	21	44	63	−19	41	
17	Corsham Town	38	11	5	22	51	64	−13	38	
18	Sherborne Town	38	9	9	20	63	80	−17	36	
19	Melksham Town (R)	38	10	5	23	41	84	−43	35	Relegation to the First Division
20	Calne Town (R)	38	8	8	22	51	77	−26	32	Relegation to the First Division

Updated to match(es) played on 28 April 2010. Source:
Rules for classification: 1) points; 2) goal difference; 3) number of goals scored.
(C) Champions; (P) Promoted; (R) Relegated

== First Division ==
The First Division featured two new clubs in a league of 20 after Larkhall Athletic and Longwell Green Sports were promoted to the Premier Division:

- Chard Town, relegated from the Premier Division
- Devizes Town, relegated from the Premier Division
- Almondsbury F.C. changed their name to Almondsbury UWE F.C. after an agreement with the University of the West of England.

=== Final table ===
Pos	Team	Pld	W	D	L	GF	GA	GD	Pts	Promotion or relegation
1	Wells City (C, P)	38	29	4	5	76	33	+43	91	Promotion to the Premier Division
2	Odd Down (P)	38	25	6	7	75	43	+32	81	Promotion to the Premier Division
3	Gillingham Town	38	23	8	7	95	51	+44	77	
4	Bradford Town	38	21	10	7	82	50	+32	73	
5	Westbury United	38	22	5	11	81	49	+32	71	
6	Oldland Abbotonians	38	20	10	8	82	42	+40	70	
7	Hengrove Athletic	38	20	8	10	75	43	+32	68	
8	Keynsham Town	38	22	5	11	68	45	+23	68 (Note: Keynsham Town had three points deducted.)	
9	Shrewton United	38	18	5	15	76	67	+9	59	
10	Bridport	38	16	6	16	65	66	−1	54	
11	Cadbury Heath	38	15	8	15	62	64	−2	53	
12	Portishead Town	38	14	6	18	53	59	−6	48	
13	Almondsbury UWE	38	13	4	21	79	84	−5	43	
14	Elmore	38	13	4	21	66	93	−27	43	
15	Clevedon United	38	12	6	20	58	72	−14	42	Resigned at the end of the season
16	Chard Town	38	7	11	20	40	74	−34	32	
17	Shepton Mallet	38	8	6	24	33	78	−45	30	
18	Roman Glass St George	38	5	11	22	38	72	−34	26	
19	Devizes Town	38	8	2	28	40	104	−64	26	
20	Minehead Town (R)	38	3	7	28	39	94	−55	16	Relegation to the Somerset County League

Updated to match(es) played on 26 April 2010. Source:
Rules for classification: 1) points; 2) goal difference; 3) number of goals scored.
(C) Champions; (P) Promoted; (R) Relegated
