= 2022–23 FA Trophy =

Football Association Trophy

Tournament details
- Country: England; Wales
- Dates: Qualifying rounds: 10 September 2022 – 8 October 2022; Competition Proper: 29 October 2022 – 21 May 2023
- Teams: Qualifying rounds: 247; Competition Proper: 72 + (72 from Qualifying); Total Teams: 319

Final positions
- Champions: FC Halifax Town (2nd title)
- Runners-up: Gateshead

The 2022–23 FA Trophy (known for sponsorship reasons as the Isuzu FA Trophy) was the 54th season of the FA Trophy, an annual football competition for teams at levels 5–8 of the English football league system.

== Eligibility ==
Applications to enter the 54th edition of the FA Trophy opened on 25 February 2022 and closed 1 April 2022.

Competition is open to the 320 clubs playing in Steps 1–4 of the National League System, equivalent to tiers 5–8 of the overall English football league system. All but Guernsey F.C. (8) appeared on the list of clubs accepted on 1 July 2022. This resulted in an odd number of teams remaining in the first round qualifying, so a bye was allocated to Leek Town.

== Format ==
The calendar was announced by The Football Association on 1 July 2022. The competition consists of three qualifying rounds and eight proper rounds. Teams enter at different stages depending on their position in the English pyramid. 8th tier teams enter into the first qualifying round and must win 11 matches to become champions. 7th tier teams enter into the third qualifying round and must win 9 matches to become champions. 6th tier teams enter into the second round proper and must win 7 matches to become champions. 5th tier teams enter into the third round proper and must win 6 matches to become champions.

All rounds are single-match knockout format, with the winner decided by penalties if the match was drawn after 90 minutes, apart from the Final where the winner was decided by extra-time and penalties if the match is drawn. This is the same format as the 2020–21 and 2021–22 season which broke from previous seasons that used replays and two-legged semi-finals. (Note: The 2019–20 season was scheduled to play two-legged semi-finals but due to their delay by the COVID-19 pandemic in the United Kingdom were shifted to a single match. All other previous editions played to the same format of replays and two-legged semi-finals.)

Round	Main Date	Number of Fixtures	Clubs Remaining	New Entries This Round	Losing Club	Winning Club
First round qualifying	13 September 2022	80 (incl. 1 bye)	319 → 240	159 (incl. 1 bye)	£400	£1,500
Second round qualifying	24 September 2022	40	240 → 200	none	£575	£2,250
Third round qualifying	8 October 2022	64	200 → 136	88	£625	£2,450
First round proper	29 October 2022	32	136 → 104	none	£775	£3,000
Second round proper	19 November 2022	40	104 → 64	48	£1,000	£3,750
Third round proper	17 December 2022	32	64 → 32	24	£1,250	£4,500
Fourth round proper	14 January 2023	16	32 → 16	none	£1,500	£5,250
Fifth round proper	11 February 2023	8	16 → 8	none	£1,750	£6,000
Quarter-finals	11 March 2023	4	8 → 4	none	£2,000	£7,500
Semi-finals	1 April 2023	2	4 → 2	none	£5,000	£15,000
Final	21 May 2023	1	2 → 1	none	£30,000	£60,000

== First round qualifying ==
The draw for the first qualifying round was made on 8 July 2022.

159 teams, all from Level 8 of the English football league system, were drawn into 79 fixtures, with the leftover team, Leek Town, receiving a bye. Ties were originally scheduled for 9–11 September, but were postponed to 12–14 September as a mark of respect following the death of Queen Elizabeth II.

Tie	(Tier) Home team	Score	Away team (Tier)	Att.
Monday 12 September 2022
16	(8) Brighouse Town	0–2	Worksop Town (8)	199
30	(8) Grantham Town	1–2	Sutton Coldfield Town (8)	148
52	(8) Merstham	3–0	Hythe Town (8)	136
Tuesday 13 September 2022
1	(8) Ramsbottom United	2–1	Glossop North End (8)	181
2	(8) Shildon AFC	1–2	Consett AFC (8)	195
3	(8) Macclesfield	7–0	Tadcaster Albion (8)	762
4	(8) Stocksbridge Park Steels	2–2 (0–3 p)	Ossett United (8)	115
5	(8) Witton Albion	3–4	Stockton Town (8)	157
7	(8) Bootle	W–O	Grimsby Borough (8)	
Grimsby Borough withdrew from the FA Trophy citing unexpected travel obligations; Walkover for Bootle
8	(8) Clitheroe	2–1	1874 Northwich (8)	272
9	(8) Prescot Cables	1–1 (4–2 p)	Cleethorpes Town (8)	249
10	(8) Mossley AFC	1–2	Dunston (8)	184
12	(8) Workington AFC	1–2	Runcorn Linnets (8)	420
13	(8) Trafford	1–2	Hebburn Town (8)	197
14	(8) North Shields	3–1	Pontefract Collieries (8)	216
15	(8) Bridlington Town	1–2	Colne (8)	155
17	(8) Bedworth United	0–1	Harborough Town (8)	121
18	(8) Newcastle Town	0–2	Spalding United (8)	84
19	(8) Daventry Town	2–3	Lincoln United (8)	60
20	(8) Stamford AFC	1–2	Chasetown (8)	207
22	(8) Carlton Town	2–0	Hanley Town (8)	96
23	(8) Long Eaton United	2–0	Gresley Rovers (8)	237
24	(8) Shepshed Dynamo	1–0	Biggleswade Town (8)	121
25	(8) Coleshill Town	3–2	St Neots Town (8)	57
26	(8) Loughborough Dynamo	3–1	Corby Town (8)	142
27	(8) Boldmere St Michaels	4–3	Sporting Khalsa (8)	84
28	(8) Halesowen Town	5–2	Biggleswade (8)	551
29	(8) Kidsgrove Athletic	3–4	Hinckley LR (8)	165
31	(8) Kempston Rovers	0–1	Dereham Town (8)	58
32	(8) Basildon United	0–2	Lowestoft Town (8)	56
33	(8) Northwood	0–3	Hanworth Villa (8)	85
34	(8) Chipstead	4–2	Waltham Abbey (8)	40
35	(8) Chertsey Town	1–3	Uxbridge (8)	221
36	(8) Beckenham Town	1–1 (1–4 p)	Heybridge Swifts (8)	138
37	(8) East Thurrock United	3–1	Sutton Common Rovers (8)	185
38	(8) Bury Town	1–2	Stowmarket Town (8)	437
39	(8) Sheppey United	3–3 (2–3 p)	Hertford Town (8)	128
40	(8) Walthamstow	1–3	Ashford Town (Middx) (8)	135
41	(8) Barton Rovers	0–1	Chatham Town (8)	48
42	(8) Bedfont Sports Club	2–2 (5–4 p)	Hashtag United (8)	246
43	(8) Welwyn Garden City	1–2	New Salamis (8)	76

Tie	(Tier) Home team	Score	Away team (Tier)	Att.
44	(8) Wroxham	4–1	East Grinstead Town (8)	131
45	(8) Gorleston	A–A	Coggeshall Town (8)	119
Match Abandoned at 0–1 due to serious injury. Tie rescheduled for Tuesday 20 September.
46	(8) Lancing	1–4	Cray Valley (PM) (8)	93
47	(8) Tilbury	1–2	Whitehawk (8)	85
48	(8) Felixstowe & Walton United	2–2 (2–3 p)	Burgess Hill Town (8)	185
50	(8) Ashford United	3–3 (5–4 p)	AFC Sudbury (8)	158
51	(8) Tooting & Mitcham United	0–0 (6–7 p)	Corinthian (8)	83
53	(8) VCD Athletic	0–3	Grays Athletic (8)	97
55	(8) Great Wakering Rovers	1–2	Harlow Town (8)	97
56	(8) Walton & Hersham	3–1	Leatherhead (8)	242
57	(8) Three Bridges	3–2	Hullbridge Sports (8)	63
58	(8) FC Romania	1–1 (4–2 p)	Westfield (8)	25
59	(8) Maldon & Tiptree	0–3	Ware (8)	119
60	(8) Witham Town	1–0	Brentwood Town (8)	116
61	(8) Chichester City	0–1	Faversham Town (8)	78
62	(8) Haywards Heath Town	0–0 (7–8 p)	Southall (8)	131
63	(8) Littlehampton Town	1–0	Ramsgate (8)	216
64	(8) Cinderford Town	0–1	Thatcham Town (8)	84
65	(8) Willand Rovers	0–3	Bideford AFC (8)	117
68	(8) Didcot Town	1–1 (5–4 p)	Hamworthy United (8)	83
69	(8) Sholing	0–1	Lymington Town (8)	107
70	(8) AFC Totton	1–1 (7–6 p)	Slimbridge AFC (8)	110
71	(8) Bishop's Cleeve	2–3	AFC Dunstable (8)	67
72	(8) Basingstoke Town	3–5	Cirencester Town (8)	190
73	(8) Berkhamsted	5–0	Exmouth Town (8)	115
74	(8) Bashley	4–1	Frome Town (8)	143
75	(8) Marlow	0–4	Binfield (8)	130
76	(8) Kidlington	0–0 (2–4 p)	Tavistock AFC (8)	60
77	(8) Thame United	2–0	Westbury United (8)	68
78	(8) Wimborne Town	2–3	Bristol Manor Farm (8)	134
79	(8) Highworth Town	1–2	Paulton Rovers (8)	68
80	(8) Leek Town	Bye		
Wednesday 14 September 2022
6	(8) Widnes	1–1 (4–2 p)	Skelmersdale United (8)	180
11	(8) City of Liverpool	0–0 (2–4 p)	Sheffield' (8)	202
21	(8) Cambridge City	4–1	Yaxley (8)	130
49	(8) South Park	1–2	Sittingbourne (8)	88
54	(8) Hadley	1–2	Sevenoaks Town (8)	101
66	(8) Aylesbury United	0–3	Evesham United (8)	107
67	(8) Larkhall Athletic	0–2	Melksham Town (8)	122
Tuesday 20 September 2022
45	(8) Gorleston	1–1 (6–7 p)	Coggeshall Town (8)	71

== Second round qualifying ==
The draw for the second qualifying round was made on 8 July 2022, and saw the 79 winners from the first qualifying round joined by Leek Town who had received a bye. All teams were from Level 8 of the English football league system.

Tie	(Tier) Home team	Score	Away team (Tier)	Att.
Friday 23 September 2022
1	(8) Hebburn Town	3–1	Stockton Town (8)	340
Saturday 24 September 2022
2	(8) Prescot Cables	1–3	Worksop Town (8)	457
3	(8) Bootle	0–3	Dunston (8)	360
4	(8) Colne	1–0	Consett AFC (8)	269
5	(8) Ramsbottom United	1–4	Clitheroe (8)	420
6	(8) Macclesfield	3–1	Widnes (8)	655
7	(8) North Shields	1–2	Runcorn Linnets (8)	355
8	(8) Sheffield	1–1 (2–4 p)	Ossett United (8)	351
9	(8) Hinckley LR	0–0 (3–0 p)	Cambridge City (8)	73
10	(8) Coleshill Town	4–4 (2–4 p)	Leek Town (8)	118
11	(8) Long Eaton United	0–0 (2–4 p)	Loughborough Dynamo (8)	428
12	(8) Dereham Town	0–1	Spalding United (8)	162
13	(8) Harborough Town	2–1	Shepshed Dynamo (8)	248
14	(8) Lincoln United	1–1 (4–3 p)	Carlton Town (8)	196
15	(8) Sutton Coldfield Town	2–0	Halesowen Town (8)	531
16	(8) Boldmere St Michaels	1–1 (4–5 p)	Chasetown (8)	241
17	(8) Cray Valley (PM)	5–3	East Thurrock United (8)	105
18	(8) Chatham Town	0–1	Stowmarket Town (8)	518
19	(8) Hanworth Villa	3–2	Littlehampton Town (8)	196
21	(8) Uxbridge	2–0	Bedfont Sports (8)	122

Tie	(Tier) Home team	Score	Away team (Tier)	Att.
23	(8) Sittingbourne	1–1 (3–4 p)	Burgess Hill Town (8)	174
24	(8) Wroxham	5–1	Lowestoft Town (8)	271
25	(8) Corinthian	2–4	Whitehawk (8)	82
26	(8) Sevenoaks Town	2–2 (5–3 p)	Hertford Town (8)	146
27	(8) Ashford United	2–0	Three Bridges (8)	247
28	(8) Heybridge Swifts	2–1	Chipstead (8)	251
29	(8) Harlow Town	4–1	Ashford Town (Middx) (8)	214
30	(8) Walton & Hersham	4–0	Southall (8)	342
31	(8) New Salamis	3–0	Coggeshall Town (8)	92
32	(8) Witham Town	2–1	Ware (8)	131
33	(8) Tavistock	1–0	Didcot Town (8)	162
34	(8) Cirencester Town	3–2	Paulton Rovers (8)	139
35	(8) AFC Totton	2–1	Berkhamsted (8)	231
36	(8) Bristol Manor Farm	2–2 (5–4 p)	Bideford (8)	158
37	(8) Thatcham Town	0–3	AFC Dunstable (8)	154
38	(8) Evesham United	1–0	Lymington Town (8)	197
39	(8) Thame United	1–2	Binfield (8)	156
40	(8) Bashley	2–2 (4–5 p)	Melksham Town (8)	256
Sunday 25 September 2022
20	(8) FC Romania	2–3	Faversham Town (8)	47
22	(8) Grays Athletic	4–1	Merstham (8)	178

== Third round qualifying ==
The draw for the third qualifying round was made on 26 September 2022, and saw 88 clubs from tier 7 joining the 40 winners from the second qualifying round.

Tie	(Tier) Home team	Score	Away team (Tier)	Att.
Saturday 8 October 2022
1	(7) Nantwich Town	0–2	Warrington Rylands (7)	303
2	(7) Marine	1–1 (4–3 p)	Radcliffe (7)	879
3	(8) Hebburn Town	1–2	Warrington Town (7)	248
4	(7) Ashton United	0–0 (1–3 p)	Dunston (8)	184
5	(8) Macclesfield	6–1	Bamber Bridge (7)	933
6	(7) Hyde United	2–3	Colne (8)	475
7	(8) Runcorn Linnets	2–1	Ossett United (8)	616
8	(7) Guiseley	3–1	Whitby Town (7)	412
9	(7) Morpeth Town	2–3	Lancaster City (7)	237
10	(7) FC United of Manchester	0–1	Liversedge (7)	1,073
11	(7) Stalybridge Celtic	1–2	South Shields (7)	311
12	(8) Clitheroe	2–2 (1–4 p)	Marske United (7)	606
13	(7) Atherton Collieries	0–3	Leek Town (8)	201
14	(7) Stratford Town	1–2	Royston Town (7)	231
15	(7) Leiston	1–0	Evesham United (8)	159
16	(7) Gainsborough Trinity	3–1	Barwell (7)	308
17	(8) Loughborough Dynamo	1–2	Worksop Town (8)	242
18	(7) Coalville Town	4–1	Ilkeston Town (7)	485
19	(8) Lincoln United	1–3	Wroxham (8)	177
20	(7) Nuneaton Borough	2–0	Hinckley LR (8)	337
21	(7) Needham Market	0–1	Stourbridge (7)	222
22	(7) Hitchin Town	0–3	Redditch United (7)	357
23	(8) Spalding United	1–2	Stafford Rangers (7)	285
24	(7) Belper Town	1–1 (4–2 p)	St Ives Town (7)	402
25	(7) AFC Rushden & Diamonds	0–4	Tamworth (7)	401
26	(7) Bromsgrove Sporting	0–3	Chasetown (8)	605
27	(7) Matlock Town	3–0	Sutton Coldfield Town (8)	489
28	(8) Stowmarket Town	1–1 (3–0 p)	Mickleover (7)	303
29	(7) Basford United	1–1 (5–3 p)	Harborough Town (8)	209
30	(7) Bedford Town	0–3	Alvechurch (7)	315
31	(7) Rushall Olympic	3–4	Hednesford Town (7)	421
32	(7) Carshalton Athletic	2–2 (4–3 p)	Cray Valley Paper Mills (8)	314

Tie	(Tier) Home team	Score	Away team (Tier)	Att.
33	(8) Harlow Town	2–2 (3–1 p)	Hornchurch (7)	305
34	(7) Hayes & Yeading United	1–0	New Salamis (8)	205
35	(8) Burgess Hill Town	2–1	Hanworth Villa (8)	242
36	(7) Hendon	0–0 (4–5 p)	Binfield (8)	188
37	(7) Haringey Borough	1–0	Brightlingsea Regent (7)	203
38	(8) Uxbridge	1–0	Walton & Hersham (8)	156
39	(8) Ashford United	1–2	Kings Langley (7)	275
40	(7) Hanwell Town	3–1	Cray Wanderers (7)	201
41	(8) Grays Athletic	0–0 (4–2 p)	Faversham Town (8)	212
42	(7) Horsham	4–3	Aveley (7)	530
43	(7) Billericay Town	2–0	Margate (7)	491
44	(7) Beaconsfield Town	2–2 (3–1 p)	Hartley Wintney (7)	101
45	(7) Metropolitan Police	0–0 (4–5 p)	Hastings United (7)	166
46	(8) Witham Town	0–1	AFC Dunstable (8)	138
47	(7) Lewes	1–0	Sevenoaks Town (8)	550
48	(7) Corinthian Casuals	2–2 (1–3 p)	Harrow Borough (7)	59
49	(7) Herne Bay	1–2	Bishop's Stortford (7)	429
50	(7) Enfield Town	0–4	Chesham United (7)	414
51	(7) Potters Bar Town	0–2	Heybridge Swifts (8)	161
52	(7) Folkestone Invicta	1–1 (4–3 p)	Whitehawk (8)	482
53	(7) Kingstonian	2–2 (2–4 p)	Wingate & Finchley (7)	151
54	(7) Bognor Regis Town	1–0	Bowers & Pitsea (7)	432
55	(7) Canvey Island	1–4	Bracknell Town (7)	359
56	(7) Plymouth Parkway	2–0	Dorchester Town (7)	285
57	(7) Merthyr Town	0–1	AFC Totton (8)	307
59	(7) Yate Town	0–2	Weston-super-Mare (7)	282
60	(8) Tavistock	3–1	Melksham Town (8)	140
61	(7) Swindon Supermarine	3–0	Cirencester Town (8)	279
62	(8) Bristol Manor Farm	2–0	Gosport Borough (7)	161
63	(7) North Leigh	3–3 (5–3 p)	Tiverton Town (7)	117
64	(7) Winchester City	2–0	Poole Town (7)	276
Sunday 9 October 2022
58	Truro City (7)	1–0	Salisbury (7)	133

== First round proper ==
The draw for the first round was made on 10 October containing the 64 winners from the previous round.

Tie	(Tier) Home team	Score	Away team (Tier)	Att.
Saturday 29 October 2022
1	(8) Macclesfield	0–2	Guiseley (7)	805
2	(8) Runcorn Linnets	3–2	Belper Town (7)	626
3	(7) Matlock Town	1–0	Stafford Rangers (7)	566
4	(8) Leek Town	2–1	Worksop Town (8)	504
5	(7) Lancaster City	3–2	Gainsborough Trinity (7)	222
6	(7) Warrington Town	3–1	South Shields (7)	577
7	(7) Liversedge	0–2	Tamworth (7)	241
8	(7) Basford United	1–2	Marine (7)	229
9	(7) Hednesford Town	4–2	Stourbridge (7)	504
10	(8) Colne	5–0	Warrington Rylands (7)	169
11	(8) Dunston	1–3	Coalville Town (7)	219
12	(8) Chasetown	0–2	Marske United (7)	375
13	(7) Nuneaton Borough	1–2	Alvechurch (7)	281
14	(7) Royston Town	0–2	Heybridge Swifts (8)	334
15	(8) AFC Dunstable	0–1	Hanwell Town (7)	130
16	(8) Uxbridge	4–2	Wingate & Finchley (7)	103

Tie	(Tier) Home team	Score	Away team (Tier)	Att.
17	(7) Chesham United	2–2 (1–3 p)	Lewes (7)	262
18	(8) Harlow Town	0–4	Bishop's Stortford (7)	805
19	(8) Grays Athletic	0–1	Stowmarket Town (8)	304
20	(7) Haringey Borough	1–3	Billericay Town (7)	377
21	(7) Leiston	2–1	Wroxham (8)	235
22	(7) Carshalton Athletic	0–1	Kings Langley (7)	338
23	(7) Harrow Borough	2–0	Hayes & Yeading United (7)	248
24	(7) Hastings United	4–2	Burgess Hill Town (8)	575
25	(7) Folkestone Invicta	2–0	Horsham (7)	662
26	(7) Plymouth Parkway	3–1	Bristol Manor Farm (8)	500
28	(8) Tavistock	2–1	Binfield (8)	202
29	(7) Redditch United	3–1	AFC Totton (8)	304
30	(7) Weston-super-Mare	1–2	Bognor Regis Town (7)	400
31	(7) Winchester City	0–5	Swindon Supermarine (7)	264
32	(7) Beaconsfield Town	2–0	Truro City (7)	138
Sunday 30 October 2022
27	(7) Bracknell Town	3–2	North Leigh (7)	216

== Second round proper ==
The draw for the second round was made on 31 October 2022, with eighty teams making an appearance including 32 winners from the previous round and 48 teams newly entering from Level 6.

Tie	(Tier) Home team	Score	Away team (Tier)	Att.
Saturday 19 November 2022
1	(6) Bradford (Park Avenue)	1–2	Farsley Celtic (6)	377
2	(6) Chorley	1–0	Leek Town (8)	748
3	(6) Chester	2–1	Lancaster City (7)	1,475
4	(6) Spennymoor Town	3–2	Runcorn Linnets (8)	632
5	(6) Southport	1–3	Curzon Ashton (6)	829
6	(7) Warrington Town	0–1	Guiseley (7)	560
7	(7) Marine	1–0	Scarborough Athletic (6)	1,144
8	(6) Blyth Spartans	4–2	Buxton (6)	640
9	(6) Darlington	4–1	Alfreton Town (6)	931
10	(6) AFC Fylde	2–1	Colne (8)	675
11	(7) Matlock Town	1–2	Marske United (7)	637
12	(7) Kings Langley	1–2	AFC Telford United (6)	322
13	(7) Tamworth	1–1 (3–2 p)	Boston United (6)	944
14	(6) Banbury United	6–0	Stowmarket Town (8)	702
15	(8) Heybridge Swifts	3–0	Hereford (6)	474
16	(6) Leamington	1–0	Bishop's Stortford (7)	387
17	(7) Coalville Town	2–0	Hednesford Town (7)	565
18	(6) Chelmsford City	2–1	Redditch United (7)	435
19	(6) Braintree Town	1–0	Brackley Town (6)	247
20	(7) Leiston	4–3	Alvechurch (7)	254

Tie	(Tier) Home team	Score	Away team (Tier)	Att.
21	(6) King's Lynn Town	1–1 (4–5 p)	Hemel Hempstead Town (6)	981
22	(6) Kettering Town	WO	Gloucester City (6)	446
23	(6) St Albans City	1–2	Kidderminster Harriers (6)	1,028
24	(6) Peterborough Sports	3–2	Cheshunt (6)	186
25	(6) Taunton Town	2–1	Dulwich Hamlet (6)	661
26	(6) Hampton & Richmond Borough	0–1	Farnborough (6)	580
27	(8) Tavistock	1–2	Hungerford Town (6)	254
28	(7) Beaconsfield Town	1–1 (4–5 p)	Folkestone Invicta (7)	132
29	(8) Uxbridge	1–1 (4–2 p)	Dover Athletic (6)	176
30	(7) Hastings United	1–2	Chippenham Town (6)	708
31	(6) Ebbsfleet United	0–1	Eastbourne Borough (6)	829
32	(6) Worthing	4–2	Weymouth (6)	1,048
33	(6) Oxford City	1–1 (2–4 p)	Plymouth Parkway (7)	207
34	(6) Welling United	3–2	Havant & Waterlooville (6)	511
35	(6) Concord Rangers	2–4	Harrow Borough (7)	151
36	(7) Lewes	2–2 (2–4 p)	Bognor Regis Town (7)	875
37	(7) Hanwell Town	0–3	Slough Town (6)	512
38	(7) Swindon Supermarine	4–0	Dartford (6)	331
39	(7) Billericay Town	1–3	Bath City (6)	612
40	(6) Tonbridge Angels	2–4	Bracknell Town (7)	669

== Third round proper ==
64 teams made an appearance including 40 winners from the previous round and 24 newly entering teams from Level 5.

Tie	(Tier) Home team	Score	Away team (Tier)	Att.
Saturday 17 December 2022
8	(7) Tamworth	2–1	Leamington (6)	769
17	(5) Yeovil Town	0–0 (1–4 p)	Dorking Wanderers (5)	962
19	(8) Heybridge Swifts	1–1 (3–5 p)	Hungerford Town (6)	519
28	(7) Folkestone Invicta	1–1 (1–4 p)	Leiston (7)	448
32	(6) Eastbourne Borough	1–2	Bracknell Town (7)	452
Tuesday 20 December 2022
1	(6) Spennymoor Town	1–3	Darlington (6)	1,005
2	(5) York City	5–0	Blyth Spartans (6)	1,172
3	(5) Altrincham	1–0	Curzon Ashton (6)	705
4	(7) Marske United	2-1	Marine (7)	260
5	(5) Chesterfield	1–3	Coalville Town (7)	2,107
7	(6) AFC Fylde	1–1 (2–4 p)	Kidderminster Harriers (6)	328
9	(5) Gateshead	5–1	Gloucester City (6)	253
10	(6) Farsley Celtic	2–2 (5–4 p)	Chester (6)	201
11	(5) Solihull Moors	2–0	AFC Telford United (6)	486
12	(5) Notts County	2–1	Chorley (6)	2,040
13	(5) Oldham Athletic	0–0 (3–2 p)	Peterborough Sports (6)	1,752

Tie	(Tier) Home team	Score	Away team (Tier)	Att.
14	(7) Guiseley	0–1	FC Halifax Town (5)	682
15	(5) Southend United	2–0	Boreham Wood (5)	1,434
16	(5) Woking	0–2	Eastleigh (5)	778
18	(5) Maidstone United	2–0	Worthing (6)	639
20	(6) Farnborough	2–2 (4–5 p)	Braintree Town (6)	231
21	(6) Banbury United	4–3	Bognor Regis Town (7)	473
22	(5) Dagenham & Redbridge	5–1	Uxbridge (8)	463
23	(6) Slough Town	0–1	Taunton Town (6)	299
24	(5) Torquay United	3–2	Chippenham Town (6)	768
25	(5) Aldershot Town	3–0	Welling United (6)	606
29	(6) Hemel Hempstead Town	2–3	Maidenhead United (5)	340
30	(5) Barnet	1–0	Plymouth Parkway (7)	336
31	(6) Bath City	2–2 (5–4 p)	Bromley (5)	551
Wednesday 21 December 2022
6	(5) Wrexham	3–1	Scunthorpe United (5)	5,080
27	(7) Swindon Supermarine	1–2	Harrow Borough (7)	211
Wednesday 4 January 2023
26	(6) Chelmsford City	2–1	Wealdstone (5)	548

== Fourth round proper ==
The draw was made on 19 December 2022 containing the 32 winners from the previous round. There were six remaining teams from the seventh tier, the lowest-ranked teams left in the competition.

Tie	(Tier) Home team	Score	Away team (Tier)	Att.
Friday 13 January 2023
7	(5) Altrincham	2–2 (4–3 p)	Wrexham (5)	2,526
Saturday 14 January 2023
1	(5) Gateshead	3–1	Oldham Athletic (5)	2,228
Match played at Oldham Athletic.
2	(5) Dorking Wanderers	3–2	Kidderminster Harriers (6)	957
4	(7) Bracknell Town	1–0	Bath City (6)	467
6	(5) Dagenham & Redbridge	0–2	Maidenhead United (5)	857
8	(5) Solihull Moors	0–2	Barnet (5)	749
10	(5) Southend United	2–1	Darlington (6)	2,741
11	(5) Aldershot Town	4–1	Leiston (7)	804

Tie	(Tier) Home team	Score	Away team (Tier)	Att.
13	(5) Eastleigh	1–0	Braintree Town (6)	907
14	(6) Hungerford Town	2–1	Tamworth (7)	524
15	(5) York City	1–1 (5–4 p)	Chelmsford City (6)	2,345
16	(6) Farsley Celtic	7–1	Marske United (7)	342
Sunday 15 January 2023
3	(5) Notts County	2–2 (5–6 p)	Maidstone United (5)	2,405
Tuesday 17 January 2023
9	(5) Torquay United	4–2	Taunton Town (6)	1,411
Tuesday 31 January 2023
5	(7) Harrow Borough	2–2 (5–6 p)	FC Halifax Town (5)	293
12	(6) Banbury United	3–2	Coalville Town (7)	592

== Fifth round proper ==
The draw was made on 16 January 2023, containing the 16 winners from the previous round. Bracknell Town of the seventh tier are the lowest-ranked team left in the competition.

Tie	(Tier) Home team	Score	Away team (Tier)	Att.
Saturday 11 February 2023
1	(6) Hungerford Town	2–3	Farsley Celtic (6)	566
2	(5) Maidenhead United	0–0 (4–5 p)	FC Halifax Town (5)	752
3	(5) Southend United	0–2	York City (5)	2,780
4	(5) Eastleigh	0–4	Maidstone United (5)	963
5	(5) Torquay United	1–2	Barnet (5)	1,459
6	(5) Aldershot Town	1–0	Dorking Wanderers (5)	1,507
7	(6) Banbury United	0–1	Gateshead (5)	840
8	(7) Bracknell Town	1–3	Altrincham (5)	518

== Quarter-finals ==
The draw for the quarter-finals was made on 13 February 2023. Eight winners from the previous round made an appearance. Farsley Celtic of the sixth tier was the lowest-ranked club remaining.

Tie	(Tier) Home team	Score	Away team (Tier)	Att.
Saturday 11 March 2023
1	(5) Gateshead	0–0 (4–2 p)	Farsley Celtic (6)	1,119
2	(5) Maidstone United	2–2 (3–4 p)	Barnet (5)	2,120
3	(5) York City	1–2	Altrincham (5)	3,867
4	(5) Aldershot Town	0–2	FC Halifax Town (5)	2,108

== Semi-finals ==
The draw for the semi-finals was made on 13 March 2023. Four winners from the previous round made an appearance.

1 April 2023
15:00

Gateshead	3–3	Barnet
Campbell 4'; Storey 24'; Olley 37'	Report	Fernandez 40'; Pritchard 80', 90+12'
Penalties
Campbell (penalty scored); Ward (penalty scored); Olley (penalty scored); Storey (penalty scored)	4–1	(penalty scored) Pritchard; (penalty missed) Kabamba; (penalty missed) De Havilland

Gateshead International Stadium
Attendance: 2,897

1 April 2023
15:00

Altrincham	1–1	FC Halifax Town
Hulme 45'	Report	Alli 90+5'
Penalties
Osborne (penalty scored); Hugill (penalty scored); Jones (penalty missed); Oyedele (penalty missed); Sinclair (penalty missed)	2–3	(penalty missed) Senior; (penalty scored) Summerfield; (penalty scored) Stott; (penalty scored) Dieseruvwe

Moss Lane
Attendance: 4,771

== Final ==
21 May 2023
16:15 BST

FC Halifax Town	1–0	Gateshead
Cooke 44'	Report

Wembley Stadium, London
Attendance: 27,374
Referee: Darren England
