= 2012–13 Western Football League =

Western Football League
- Season: 2012–13

The 2012–13 Western Football League season (known as the 2012–13 Toolstation Western Football League for sponsorship reasons) was the 111th in the history of the Western Football League, a football competition in England. Teams were divided into two divisions; the Premier and the First. The season began on 4 August 2012.

The league champions for the first time in their history were Bishop Sutton. The champions of Division One were Sherborne Town.

== Premier Division ==
The Premier Division featured five new clubs in a league of 20, increased from 18 the previous season after Merthyr Town were promoted to the Southern League, and Corsham Town and Sherborne Town were relegated to the First Division:

- Buckland Athletic, promoted as runners-up in the South West Peninsula League.
- Cadbury Heath, champions of Division One.
- Melksham Town, runners-up in Division One.
- Gillingham Town, third in Division One.
- Winterbourne United, promoted from the Hellenic League.
- Only Brislington and Hallen applied for promotion to Step 4 (Southern League Division One South & West), and one of them would have been promoted if their application had been accepted and that club won the league. If neither club won the league, one could have been promoted if a second- or third-place finish had been achieved. They could not both win promotion. However, Brislington failed to achieve the required ground grading, and Hallen failed to finish in a top three position, so no club was promoted.

=== League table ===
Pos	Team	Pld	W	D	L	GF	GA	GD	Pts	Relegation
1	Bishop Sutton (C)	38	24	10	4	94	34	+60	82	
2	Brislington	38	22	10	6	73	42	+31	76	
3	Gillingham Town	38	23	4	11	93	59	+34	73	
4	Cadbury Heath	38	22	4	12	85	53	+32	70	
5	Larkhall Athletic	38	21	6	11	77	50	+27	69	
6	Street	38	18	6	14	74	62	+12	60	
7	Bitton	38	17	8	13	60	63	−3	59	
8	Odd Down	38	16	10	12	84	58	+26	58	
9	Hallen	38	17	6	15	78	68	+10	57	
10	Buckland Athletic	38	15	10	13	77	59	+18	55	
11	Willand Rovers	38	15	10	13	52	53	−1	55	
12	Winterbourne United	38	15	4	19	66	84	−18	49	
13	Melksham Town	38	14	6	18	62	74	−12	48	
14	Bridport	38	11	14	13	55	63	−8	47	
15	Longwell Green Sports	38	12	9	17	49	64	−15	45	
16	Ilfracombe Town	38	13	5	20	52	70	−18	44	
17	Radstock Town	38	10	10	18	60	85	−25	40	
18	Bristol Manor Farm	38	11	6	21	55	72	−17	39	
19	Wells City (R)	38	7	6	25	57	90	−33	27	Relegation to the First Division
20	Barnstaple Town (R)	38	3	4	31	23	123	−100	13	Relegation to the First Division

Updated to match(es) played on 8 May 2013. Source:
Rules for classification: 1) points; 2) goal difference; 3) number of goals scored.
(C) Champions; (R) Relegated

== First Division ==
The First Division featured five new clubs in a league of 21, increased from 19 the previous season after Cadbury Heath, Melksham Town and Gillingham Town were promoted to the Premier Division:

- Cheddar, promoted as runners-up in the Somerset County League.
- Corsham Town, relegated from the Premier Division.
- Cribbs Friends Life, promoted as champions of the Gloucestershire County League.
- Sherborne Town, relegated from the Premier Division.
- Warminster Town, transferred from the Wessex League.

=== League table ===
Pos	Team	Pld	W	D	L	GF	GA	GD	Pts	Promotion or relegation
1	Sherborne Town (C, P)	40	28	9	3	116	53	+63	93	Promotion to the Premier Division
2	Hengrove Athletic (P)	40	29	4	7	93	34	+59	91	Promotion to the Premier Division
3	Bradford Town	40	26	5	9	103	48	+55	83	
4	Corsham Town	40	24	8	8	92	55	+37	80	
5	Oldland Abbotonians	40	24	7	9	77	37	+40	79	
6	Chard Town	40	24	4	12	94	59	+35	76	
7	Shepton Mallet	40	21	7	12	85	63	+22	70	
8	Cribbs Friends Life	40	19	8	13	79	55	+24	65	
9	Calne Town	40	16	12	12	67	58	+9	60	
10	Almondsbury UWE	40	15	8	17	67	65	+2	53	
11	Cheddar	40	15	3	22	76	85	−9	48	
12	Elmore	40	14	7	19	88	100	−12	48 (Note: Elmore had one point deducted for fielding an ineligible player against Shrewton United on 15 September 2012.)	Transferred to the South West Peninsula League (Note: Elmore resigned from the Western League at the end of the season, and transferred to the South West Peninsula League which operates at the same level of the football pyramid. This was to increase the number of local matches the club would play.)
13	Keynsham Town	40	15	6	19	59	73	−14	48 (Note: Keynsham Town had three points deducted for fielding an ineligible player against Shrewton United on 22 September 2012.)	
14	Portishead Town	40	15	3	22	63	82	−19	48	
15	Warminster Town	40	10	11	19	60	83	−23	41	
16	Welton Rovers	40	11	7	22	54	88	−34	40	
17	Roman Glass St George	40	9	10	21	49	76	−27	37	
18	Wellington	40	9	6	25	62	99	−37	33	
19	Westbury United	40	8	8	24	46	82	−36	32	
20	Shrewton United	40	8	6	26	43	105	−62	30	Resigned at the end of the season (Note: Shrewton United also resigned from the Western League at the end of the season, and dropped down to the Wiltshire League for financial reasons.)
21	Devizes Town	40	8	5	27	65	138	−73	29	

Updated to match(es) played on 8 May 2013. Source:
Rules for classification: 1) points; 2) goal difference; 3) number of goals scored.
(C) Champions; (P) Promoted
