= 1984–85 Western Football League =

Western Football League
- Season: 1984–85
- Champions: Saltash United (Premier Division); Portway Bristol (Division One)

The 1984–85 season was the 83rd in the history of the Western Football League.

The league champions for the first time in their history were Saltash United. The champions of Division One were Portway Bristol.

== Final tables ==
=== Premier Division ===
The Premier Division was increased from 20 to 22 clubs after Wellington were relegated to the First Division. Three clubs joined:

- Bristol City Reserves, champions of the First Division.
- Chard Town, runners-up in the First Division.
- Paulton Rovers, third-placed club in the First Division.

Pos	Team	Pld	W	D	L	GF	GA	GD	Pts	Relegation
1	Saltash United (C)	42	26	12	4	88	43	+45	64	
2	Bideford	42	26	8	8	78	29	+49	60	
3	Bristol City Reserves	42	21	14	7	69	49	+20	56	
4	Exmouth Town	42	22	8	12	83	51	+32	52	
5	Paulton Rovers	42	20	11	11	61	45	+16	51	
6	Bristol Manor Farm	42	21	7	14	70	55	+15	49	
7	Chippenham Town	42	16	14	12	62	49	+13	46	
8	Mangotsfield United	42	17	11	14	63	56	+7	45	
9	Melksham Town	42	17	11	14	57	59	−2	45	
10	Liskeard Athletic	42	17	10	15	69	54	+15	44	
11	Chard Town	42	15	13	14	58	57	+1	43	
12	Minehead	42	16	9	17	55	54	+1	41	
13	Barnstaple Town	42	18	5	19	65	65	0	41	
14	Clandown	42	14	12	16	51	52	−1	40	
15	Plymouth Argyle Reserves	42	12	14	16	58	62	−4	38	
16	Dawlish Town	42	12	13	17	44	54	−10	37	
17	Clevedon Town	42	12	12	18	45	56	−11	35 (Note: Clevedon Town and Shepton Mallet Town each had one point deducted for fielding ineligible players.)	
18	Frome Town	42	10	14	18	56	63	−7	34	
19	Weston-super-Mare	42	11	11	20	58	78	−20	33	
20	Taunton Town	42	11	11	20	53	74	−21	33	
21	Shepton Mallet Town	42	4	15	23	35	86	−51	22	
22	Devizes Town (R)	42	2	9	31	34	121	−87	13	Relegated to Division One

(C) Champions; (R) Relegated

=== First Division ===
The First Division consisted of 22 clubs, increased from 21 the previous season, after Bristol City Reserves, Chard Town and Paulton Rovers were promoted to the Premier Division. Four new clubs joined:

- Ilfracombe Town, from the North Devon League – rejoining after leaving the league in 1959.
- Torrington, from the South Western League.
- Wellington, relegated from the Premier Division.
- Westbury United, from the Wiltshire League.

Pos	Team	Pld	W	D	L	GF	GA	GD	Pts	Promotion
1	Portway Bristol (C)	42	30	3	9	97	42	+55	63	
2	Torrington (P)	42	27	8	7	83	35	+48	62	Promoted to the Premier Division
3	Wimborne Town	42	26	7	9	81	37	+44	59	
4	Swanage Town & Herston	42	23	13	6	86	50	+36	59	
5	Wellington	42	20	12	10	78	57	+21	52	
6	Radstock Town	42	23	5	14	79	47	+32	51	
7	Backwell United	42	21	9	12	59	42	+17	51	
8	Keynsham Town	42	20	9	13	70	54	+16	49	
9	Ottery St Mary	42	17	14	11	58	51	+7	48	
10	Larkhall Athletic	42	18	7	17	51	46	+5	43	
11	Heavitree United	42	14	11	17	81	84	−3	39	
12	Glastonbury	42	14	11	17	55	63	−8	39	
13	Bath City Reserves	42	16	7	19	60	69	−9	39	
14	Elmore	42	16	6	20	69	95	−26	38	
15	Yeovil Town Reserves	42	14	10	18	53	63	−10	37 (Note: Yeovil Town Reserves had one point deducted for fielding an ineligible player.)	
16	Welton Rovers	42	14	9	19	61	72	−11	37	
17	Tiverton Town	42	11	12	19	61	66	−5	34	
18	Weymouth Reserves	42	14	3	25	67	96	−29	31	
19	Warminster Town	42	8	13	21	54	93	−39	29	
20	Westbury United	42	10	7	25	57	99	−42	27	
21	Ilfracombe Town	42	6	7	29	47	101	−54	19	
22	Odd Down	42	5	7	30	38	83	−45	17	

Rules for classification: The system of using goal difference to separate two teams tied on points was used. The points system: 2 points for a win, 1 point for a draw and 0 points for losing.
(C) Champions; (P) Promoted
