= 2010–11 Western Football League =

Western Football League
- Season: 2010–11

The 2010–11 Western Football League season (known as the 2010–11 Toolstation Western Football League for sponsorship reasons) was the 109th in the history of the Western Football League, a football competition in England. Teams were divided into two divisions; the Premier and the First.

The league champions for the first time in their history were Larkhall Athletic. The champions of Division One were newcomers Merthyr Town.

== Premier Division ==
The Premier Division featured two new clubs in a league of 19, reduced from 20 the previous season after Bideford were promoted to the Southern League, and Calne Town and Melksham Town were relegated to the First Division:

- Odd Down, runners-up in the First Division.
- Wells City, champions of the First Division.

Premier League champions Larkhall Athletic and runners-up Bitton were both ineligible for promotion to the Southern League due to ground grading issues.

=== Stadia and locations ===
Locations of the 2010–11 Premier Division clubs

Club	Location	Stadium	Capacity
Barnstaple Town	Barnstaple	Mill Road	5,000
Bishop Sutton	Bishop Sutton	Lakeview	1,500
Bitton	Bitton	Recreation Ground	2,000
Brislington	Brislington	Brislington Stadium	3,000
Bristol Manor Farm	Bristol	The Creek	1,700
Corsham Town	Corsham	Lacock Road	1,200
Dawlish Town	Dawlish	Sandy Lane	
Hallen	Hallen	The Hallen Centre	2,000
Ilfracombe Town	Ilfracombe	Marlborough Park	2,000
Larkhall Athletic	Bath	Plain Ham	1,429
Longwell Green Sports	Longwell Green	Longwell Green Community Stadium	1,000
Odd Down	Bath	Lew Hill Memorial Ground	1,000
Radstock Town	Radstock	Southfield Recreation Ground	1,250
Sherborne Town	Sherborne	Raleigh Grove	1,150
Street	Street	The Tannery	1,500
Wellington	Wellington	The Playing Field	1,500
Wells City	Wells	The Athletic Ground	1,500
Welton Rovers	Midsomer Norton	West Clewes	2,400
Willand Rovers	Willand	Silver Street	1,000

=== Final table ===
Pos	Team	Pld	W	D	L	GF	GA	GD	Pts	Relegation
1	Larkhall Athletic (C)	36	25	4	7	83	46	+37	79	
2	Bitton	36	21	7	8	71	37	+34	70	
3	Ilfracombe Town	36	20	7	9	59	37	+22	67	
4	Willand Rovers	36	18	11	7	69	40	+29	65	
5	Bishop Sutton	36	18	9	9	66	38	+28	63	
6	Dawlish Town	36	17	10	9	78	65	+13	61	Resigned before the 2011–12 season
7	Bristol Manor Farm	36	18	7	11	73	63	+10	61	
8	Odd Down	36	17	8	11	60	47	+13	59	
9	Wells City	36	16	7	13	67	55	+12	55	
10	Corsham Town	36	14	9	13	48	49	−1	51	
11	Barnstaple Town	36	15	6	15	65	74	−9	51	
12	Radstock Town	36	15	3	18	59	56	+3	48	
13	Street	36	12	9	15	50	61	−11	45	
14	Sherborne Town	36	13	4	19	58	70	−12	43	
15	Brislington	36	9	11	16	36	56	−20	38	
16	Hallen	36	10	6	20	56	79	−23	36	
17	Longwell Green Sports	36	7	5	24	35	79	−44	26	
18	Wellington (R)	36	5	6	25	48	87	−39	21	Relegation to the First Division
19	Welton Rovers (R)	36	4	7	25	38	80	−42	19	Relegation to the First Division

Updated to match(es) played on 2 May 2011. Source:
Rules for classification: 1) points; 2) goal difference; 3) number of goals scored.
(C) Champions; (R) Relegated

== First Division ==
The First Division featured three new clubs, reduced to 19 teams from 20 the previous season, after Odd Down and Wells City were promoted to the Premier Division, Clevedon United resigned and Minehead Town were relegated. Both the latter two clubs joined the Somerset County Football League.

- Calne Town, relegated from the Premier Division.
- Melksham Town, relegated from the Premier Division.
- Merthyr Town, newly formed after the liquidation of Merthyr Tydfil of the Southern Football League.

Oldland Abbotonians finished second in the First Division, but were refused promotion due to ground grading issues. Bridport took the second promotion place instead. Elmore were accepted into the First Division for 2011–12 despite finishing bottom of the table this season.

=== Stadia and locations ===
Locations of the 2010–11 Division One clubs

Club	Location	Stadium	Capacity
Almondsbury UWE	Almondsbury	The Field	1,000
Bradford Town	Bradford-on-Avon	Trowbridge Road	1,800
Bridport	Bridport	St Mary's Field	2,000
Cadbury Heath	Cadbury Heath	Springfield	2,000
Calne Town	Calne	Bremhill View	2,500
Chard Town	Chard	Dening Sports Field	1,500
Devizes Town	Devizes	Nursteed Road	2,500
Elmore	Tiverton	Horsdon Park	
Gillingham Town	Gillingham	Hardings Lane	
Hengrove Athletic	Bristol	Norton Lane	
Keynsham Town	Keynsham	Crown Field	3,001
Melksham Town	Melksham	The Conigre	3,000
Merthyr Town	(Wales) Taff's Well	Rhiw'r Ddar	3,000
Oldland Abbotonians	Oldland Common	Aitchison Playing Field	1,000
Portishead Town	Portishead	Bristol Road	
Roman Glass St George	Bristol	Whiteway Road	
Shepton Mallet	Shepton Mallet	The Playing Fields	2,500
Shrewton United	Shrewton	Shrewton Recreation Ground	700
Westbury United	Westbury	Meadow Lane	2,500

=== Final table ===
Pos	Team	Pld	W	D	L	GF	GA	GD	Pts	Promotion
1	Merthyr Town (C, P)	36	29	3	4	118	33	+85	90	Promotion to the Premier Division
2	Oldland Abbotonians	36	22	10	4	93	46	+47	76	
3	Bridport (P)	36	23	3	10	74	44	+30	72	Promotion to the Premier Division
4	Cadbury Heath	36	20	9	7	88	49	+39	68 (Note: Cadbury Heath had one point deducted.)	
5	Devizes Town	36	21	2	13	63	65	−2	65	
6	Bradford Town	36	18	7	11	84	62	+22	61	
7	Gillingham Town	36	18	6	12	73	57	+16	60	
8	Melksham Town	36	14	13	9	63	51	+12	55	
9	Shrewton United	36	15	6	15	71	79	−8	51	
10	Hengrove Athletic	36	13	7	16	52	58	−6	46	
11	Calne Town	36	14	6	16	72	56	+16	44 (Note: Calne Town had four points deducted.)	
12	Almondsbury UWE	36	11	11	14	55	64	−9	44	
13	Chard Town	36	11	8	17	57	68	−11	41	
14	Shepton Mallet	36	11	5	20	47	76	−29	38	
15	Roman Glass St George	36	10	6	20	43	76	−33	36	
16	Keynsham Town	36	9	8	19	45	61	−16	35	
17	Westbury United	36	9	3	24	45	82	−37	30	
18	Portishead Town	36	6	11	19	48	84	−36	29	
19	Elmore	36	5	2	29	47	127	−80	17	

Updated to match(es) played on 2 May 2011. Source:
Rules for classification: 1) points; 2) goal difference; 3) number of goals scored.
(C) Champions; (P) Promoted
