= 1987–88 Western Football League =

86th season of the Western Football League

Western Football League
- Season: 1987–88
- Champions: Liskeard Athletic (Premier Division); Welton Rovers (Division One)

The 1987–88 season was the 86th in the history of the Western Football League.

The league champions for the first time in their history were Liskeard Athletic. The champions of Division One were Welton Rovers.

== Final tables ==
=== Premier Division ===
The Premier Division remained at 22 clubs after Chard Town were relegated to the First Division. One club joined:

- Swanage Town & Herston, champions of the First Division.

Pos	Team	Pld	W	D	L	GF	GA	GD	Pts	Relegation
1	Liskeard Athletic (C)	42	29	10	3	98	33	+65	68	
2	Saltash United	42	27	6	9	116	41	+75	60	
3	Mangotsfield United	42	25	10	7	99	38	+61	60	
4	Plymouth Argyle Reserves	42	26	8	8	105	46	+59	60	
5	Weston-super-Mare	42	21	8	13	81	62	+19	50	
6	Exmouth Town	42	19	10	13	61	55	+6	48	
7	Bristol City Reserves	42	16	15	11	76	53	+23	47	Left at the end of the season
8	Bristol Manor Farm	42	17	14	11	66	52	+14	47 (Note: Bristol Manor Farm and Frome Town both had one point deducted for fielding an ineligible player.)	
9	Taunton Town	42	15	15	12	49	48	+1	45	
10	Bideford	42	17	9	16	60	61	−1	43	
11	Swanage Town & Herston	42	16	10	16	73	62	+11	42	
12	Barnstaple Town	42	17	6	19	62	72	−10	40	
13	Clevedon Town	42	13	12	17	42	56	−14	38	
14	Paulton Rovers	42	13	10	19	46	72	−26	36	
15	Dawlish Town	42	14	6	22	49	77	−28	34	
16	Radstock Town	42	13	9	20	44	57	−13	33 (Note: Radstock Town had two points deducted for fielding an ineligible player.)	
17	Torrington	42	12	7	23	49	83	−34	31	
18	Frome Town	42	9	13	20	36	69	−33	30	
19	Minehead	42	10	10	22	47	87	−40	30	
20	Chippenham Town	42	10	8	24	35	62	−27	28	
21	Melksham Town (R)	42	7	14	21	45	84	−39	28	Relegated to the First Division
22	Clandown (R)	42	5	12	25	33	102	−69	22	Relegated to the First Division

(C) Champions; (R) Relegated

=== First Division ===
The First Division was reduced from 22 to 19 clubs, after Swanage Town & Herston were promoted to the Premier Division, Wimborne Town were transferred to the Wessex League, Portway Bristol disbanded and Weymouth Reserves also left. One new club joined:

- Chard Town, relegated from the Premier Division.

Pos	Team	Pld	W	D	L	GF	GA	GD	Pts	Promotion
1	Welton Rovers (C, P)	36	21	12	3	74	36	+38	54 (Note: The tables as published at the time contained errors, hence the totals do not balance in some columns.)	Promoted to the Premier Division
2	Chard Town (P)	36	21	11	4	75	41	+34	53	Promoted to the Premier Division
3	Tiverton Town	36	21	7	8	82	46	+36	49	
4	Bath City Reserves	36	18	11	7	61	46	+15	47	
5	Larkhall Athletic	36	17	8	11	72	49	+23	42	
6	Devizes Town	36	15	9	12	44	38	+6	39	
7	Keynsham Town	36	16	7	13	53	54	−1	39	
8	Westbury United	36	15	7	14	61	56	+5	37	
9	Ottery St Mary	36	16	5	15	43	41	+2	37	
10	Backwell United	36	11	13	12	49	52	−3	35	
11	Warminster Town	36	15	5	16	46	55	−9	35	
12	Wellington	36	14	6	16	60	67	−7	34	
13	Calne Town	36	11	10	15	45	59	−14	32	
14	Odd Down	36	10	11	15	51	62	−11	31	
15	Ilfracombe Town	36	11	7	18	45	59	−14	29	
16	Heavitree United	36	11	6	19	49	62	−13	28	
17	Yeovil Town Reserves	36	7	11	18	39	57	−18	25	
18	Elmore	36	7	6	23	46	81	−35	20	
19	Glastonbury	36	5	8	23	39	73	−34	18	

Rules for classification: The system of using goal difference to separate two teams tied on points was used. The points system: 2 points for a win, 1 point for a draw and 0 points for losing.
(C) Champions; (P) Promoted
