= 1992–93 Western Football League =

Western Football League
- Season: 1992–93
- Champions: Clevedon Town (Premier Division); Odd Down (Division One)

The 1992–93 season was the 91st in the history of the Western Football League.

The league champions for the first time in their history were Clevedon Town, who finished the season unbeaten and were promoted to the Southern League. The champions of Division One were Odd Down.

== Final tables ==
=== Premier Division ===
The Premier Division was reduced from 21 to 20 clubs after Weston-super-Mare were promoted to the Southern League, and Ottery St Mary and Welton Rovers were relegated to the First Division. Two clubs joined:

- Torquay United Reserves, runners-up in the First Division.
- Westbury United, champions of the First Division.

Pos	Team	Pld	W	D	L	GF	GA	GD	Pts	Promotion or relegation
1	Clevedon Town (C, P)	38	34	4	0	137	23	+114	106	Promoted to the Southern League
2	Tiverton Town	38	28	8	2	134	30	+104	92	
3	Saltash United	38	22	8	8	98	51	+47	74	
4	Taunton Town	38	22	8	8	62	37	+25	74	
5	Mangotsfield United	38	20	8	10	89	47	+42	68	
6	Torrington	38	17	10	11	69	44	+25	61	
7	Westbury United	38	18	7	13	50	45	+5	61	
8	Paulton Rovers	38	15	10	13	76	51	+25	55	
9	Torquay United Reserves	38	16	7	15	58	62	−4	55	Left at the end of the season
10	Plymouth Argyle Reserves	38	15	9	14	72	64	+8	54	Left at the end of the season
11	Exmouth Town	38	14	9	15	47	59	−12	51	
12	Elmore	38	14	5	19	54	71	−17	47	
13	Bristol Manor Farm	38	10	13	15	49	59	−10	43	
14	Bideford	38	11	8	19	59	66	−7	41	
15	Frome Town	38	9	12	17	57	75	−18	39	
16	Chippenham Town	38	8	14	16	65	86	−21	38	
17	Minehead	38	10	8	20	59	88	−29	38	
18	Liskeard Athletic	38	8	9	21	61	87	−26	33	
19	Chard Town (R)	38	6	3	29	37	119	−82	21	Relegated to the First Division
20	Dawlish Town (R)	38	2	2	34	17	186	−169	8	Relegated to the First Division

(C) Champions; (P) Promoted; (R) Relegated

=== First Division ===
The First Division was reduced from 22 clubs to 21, after Westbury United and Torquay United Reserves were promoted to the Premier Division, and Bath City Reserves and Clandown left the league. Three new clubs joined:

- Clyst Rovers, promoted from the South Western League.
- Ottery St Mary, relegated from the Premier Division.
- Welton Rovers, relegated from the Premier Division.

Pos	Team	Pld	W	D	L	GF	GA	GD	Pts	Promotion
1	Odd Down (C, P)	40	27	10	3	87	26	+61	91	Promoted to the Premier Division
2	Calne Town (P)	40	23	12	5	97	47	+50	81	Promoted to the Premier Division
3	Crediton United (P)	40	23	11	6	79	43	+36	80	Promoted to the Premier Division
4	Brislington	40	22	8	10	77	41	+36	74	
5	Warminster Town	40	22	7	11	70	50	+20	73	
6	Clyst Rovers	40	18	13	9	75	48	+27	67	
7	Keynsham Town	40	19	10	11	66	50	+16	67	
8	Backwell United	40	16	14	10	68	52	+16	62	
9	Barnstaple Town	40	15	10	15	62	58	+4	55	
10	Bridport	40	14	13	13	67	66	+1	55	
11	Heavitree United	40	14	9	17	64	69	−5	51	
12	Devizes Town	40	15	6	19	61	84	−23	51	
13	Bishop Sutton	40	14	8	18	55	55	0	50	
14	Welton Rovers	40	12	11	17	69	65	+4	47	
15	Wellington	40	11	14	15	53	65	−12	47	
16	Glastonbury	40	13	5	22	52	70	−18	44	
17	Larkhall Athletic	40	11	5	24	59	81	−22	38	
18	Ilfracombe Town	40	8	9	23	47	94	−47	33	
19	Ottery St Mary	40	9	5	26	53	116	−63	32	
20	Radstock Town	40	7	10	23	38	60	−22	31	
21	Melksham Town	40	6	12	22	39	98	−59	30	Left to join the Wiltshire County League

Rules for classification: The system of using goal difference to separate two teams tied on points was used. The points system: 3 points for a win, 1 point for a draw and 0 points for losing.
(C) Champions; (P) Promoted
