= 2021–22 FA Trophy =

Football Association Trophy

Tournament details
- Country: England; Wales
- Dates: Qualifying rounds: 25 September 2021 – 3 November 2021; Competition Proper: 13 November 2021 – 22 May 2022
- Teams: Qualifying rounds: 244; Competition Proper: 66 + (78 from Qualifying); Total Teams: 310

Final positions
- Champions: Bromley (1st title)
- Runners-up: Wrexham

The 2021–22 FA Trophy (known for sponsorship reasons as the Buildbase FA Trophy) was the 53rd season of the FA Trophy, an annual football competition for teams at levels 5-8 of the English National League System. The competition consisted of three qualifying rounds, and seven proper rounds. Teams from level 8 entered into the first qualifying round and second qualifying round, level 7 into the third qualifying round, level 6 (the National League North and National League South) into round 2, and level 5 (the National League) into round 3.

All matches were in a single-match knockout format, with the winner decided by penalties if the match was drawn after 90 minutes, apart from the Final where the winner was decided by extra-time and penalties if the match was drawn. This was the same format as the 2020–21 season which was a change from previous seasons where replays were used and where the semi-finals were scheduled as two-legged.

== Calendar ==
The calendar for the 2021-22 Buildbase FA Trophy, as announced by The Football Association.

Round	Main Date	Number of Fixtures	Clubs Remaining	New Entries This Round	Losing Club	Winning Club
First round qualifying	25 September 2021	19	310 → 291	38	£400	£1,500
Second round qualifying	9 October 2021	69	291 → 222	119	£575	£2,250
Third round qualifying	30 October 2021	78	222 → 144	87	£625	£2,450
First round proper	13 November 2021	39	144 → 105	0	£775	£3,000
Second round proper	27 November 2021	41	105 → 64	43	£1,000	£3,750
Third round proper	18 December 2021	32	64 → 32	23	£1,250	£4,500
Fourth round proper	15 January 2022	16	32 → 16	0	£1,500	£5,250
Fifth round proper	12 February 2022	8	16 → 8	0	£1,750	£6,000
Quarter-finals	12 March 2022	4	8 → 4	0	£2,000	£7,500
Semi-finals	2 April 2022	2	4 → 2	0	£5,000	£15,000
Final	22 May 2022	1	2 → 1	0	£30,000	£60,000

== First round qualifying ==
The draw for the first qualifying round was made on 9 July 2021. The round included 38 teams from tier 8, the lowest tier in the competition.

Tie	Home team (tier)	Score	Away team (tier)	Att.
Saturday 25 September 2021
1	Pontefract Collieries (8)	1–1 (2–4 p)	Yorkshire Amateur (8)	76
2	Widnes (8)	2–0	Brighouse Town (8)	77
3	City Of Liverpool (8)	0–0 (4–3 p)	Stockton Town (8)	222
4	Dunston (8)	3–2	Worksop Town (8)	313
5	Sporting Khalsa (8)	6–5	Dereham Town (8)	127
6	Stamford (8)	0–1	Daventry Town (8)	274
7	Bedford Town (8)	1–0	St Neots Town (8)	324
8	Kempston Rovers (8)	2–2 (3–4 p)	Newcastle Town (8)	73
9	Hastings United (8)	3–0	AFC Dunstable (8)	823
10	Welwyn Garden City (8)	3–3 (4–1 p)	Hythe Town (8)	111

Tie	Home team (tier)	Score	Away team (tier)	Att.
11	Ramsgate (8)	5–0	Sutton Common Rovers (8)	444
13	Stowmarket Town (8)	1–1 (3–4 p)	Great Wakering Rovers (8)	224
14	Corinthian (8)	1–1 (5–4 p)	Grays Athletic (8)	111
15	Canvey Island (8)	4–1	Coggeshall Town (8)	262
16	Ashford United (8)	1–1 (5–4 p)	Chalfont St Peter (8)	240
17	Chichester City (8)	4–0	Whitstable Town (8)	193
18	Wantage Town (8)	1–2	Willand Rovers (8)	104
19	Thame United (8)	3–2	Winchester City (8)	66
Sunday 26 September 2021
12	Hashtag United (8)	1–4	Chipstead (8)	219

== Second round qualifying ==
The draw for the second qualifying round was made on 9 July 2021, and saw 119 clubs from tier 8 joining the 19 winners from the first qualifying round.

Tie	Home team (tier)	Score	Away team (tier)	Att.
Saturday 9 October 2021
1	Mossley (8)	3–1	Ossett United (8)	579
2	Bridlington Town (8)	3–3 (5–4 p)	Sheffield (8)	281
3	Clitheroe (8)	1–1 (9–10 p)	Liversedge (8)	583
4	Trafford (8)	1–1 (1–3 p)	Bootle (8)	525
5	Prescot Cables (8)	0–2	Frickley Athletic (8)	479
6	Pickering Town (8)	2–1	Ramsbottom United (8)	142
7	Tadcaster Albion (8)	1–5	Runcorn Linnets (8)	224
8	1874 Northwich (8)	1–1 (1–4 p)	Marine (8)	301
9	Stocksbridge Park Steels (8)	0–2	Widnes (8)	122
10	Kendal Town (8)	0–3	Yorkshire Amateur (8)	93
11	Marske United (8)	3–0	Glossop North End (8)	459
12	City of Liverpool (8)	0–1	Colne (8)	192
13	Cleethorpes Town (8)	0–2	Shildon (8)	258
14	Warrington Rylands (8)	0–0 (2–3 p)	Hebburn Town (8)	178
15	Workington (8)	0–1	Dunston (8)	515
16	Market Drayton Town (8)	0–7	Leek Town (8)	198
17	Soham Town Rangers (8)	1–0	Shepshed Dynamo (8)	124
18	Coleshill Town (8)	2–3	Newcastle Town (8)	74
19	Chasetown (8)	0–0 (4–2 p)	Halesowen Town (8)	879
20	Bury Town (8)	0–2	Wisbech Town (8)	421
21	Kidsgrove Athletic (8)	4–1	Evesham United (8)	258
22	Spalding United (8)	3–2	Belper Town (8)	379
23	Carlton Town (8)	1–1 (5–4 p)	Bedworth United (8)	144
24	Bedford Town (8)	5–0	Cambridge City (8)	360
25	Loughborough Dynamo (8)	3–6	Sporting Khalsa (8)	136
26	Corby Town (8)	5–3	Histon (8)	524
27	Lincoln United (8)	0–3	Sutton Coldfield Town (8)	248
28	Yaxley (8)	2–0	Biggleswade (8)	132
29	Daventry Town (8)	0–0 (1–4 p)	Ilkeston Town (8)	160
30	Chichester City (8)	1–2	Great Wakering Rovers (8)	242
31	Westfield (8)	3–2	Ramsgate (8)	87
32	Heybridge Swifts (8)	2–0	Barking (8)	183
33	Faversham Town (8)	3–2	Tilbury (8)	190
34	AFC Sudbury (8)	0–0 (3–2 p)	Cray Valley Paper Mills (8)	210
35	Maldon & Tiptree (8)	1–1 (6–7 p)	Felixstowe & Walton United (8)	272

Tie	Home team (tier)	Score	Away team (tier)	Att.
36	Sittingbourne (8)	1–3	Herne Bay (8)	247
37	Staines Town (8)	3–1	Three Bridges (8)	123
38	South Park (8)	W/O	Whyteleafe (8)	NA
South Park awarded a walkover due to Whyteleafe withdrawing from the Isthmian League and other Football Association competitions.
39	Colney Heath (8)	2–5	Basildon United (8)	96
40	VCD Athletic (8)	1–2	Chertsey Town (8)	90
41	Northwood (8)	0–0 (4–3 p)	Haywards Heath Town (8)	124
42	Marlow (8)	1–0	FC Romania (8)	234
43	Welwyn Garden City (8)	3–0	Ashford Town (8)	142
44	East Grinstead Town (8)	2–2 (2–4 p)	Waltham Abbey (8)	169
45	Barton Rovers (8)	0–2	Berkhamsted (8)	114
46	Hullbridge Sports (8)	1–4	Hanwell Town (8)	125
47	Bedfont Sports (8)	3–1	Romford (8)	127
48	Tooting & Mitcham United (8)	1–4	Whitehawk (8)	288
49	Witham Town (8)	1–0	Lancing (8)	87
50	Burgess Hill Town (8)	1–1 (3–1 p)	Sevenoaks Town (8)	338
51	Bracknell Town (8)	3–2	Hertford Town (8)	118
52	Ware (8)	2–2 (6–7 p)	Canvey Island (8)	252
53	Corinthian (8)	1–2	Brentwood Town (8)	103
54	Aveley (8)	1–2	Uxbridge (8)	242
55	Hastings United (8)	2–0	Ashford United (8)	1,014
56	Aylesbury United (8)	1–1 (2–4 p)	Chipstead (8)	127
57	Harlow Town (8)	3–1	Phoenix Sports (8)	202
58	Bristol Manor Farm (8)	1–2	Paulton Rovers (8)	210
59	Melksham Town (8)	3–2	Basingstoke Town (8)	221
60	Didcot Town (8)	1–5	Frome Town (8)	263
61	North Leigh (8)	2–2 (1–4 p)	Binfield (8)	111
62	Willand Rovers (8)	2–1	Mangotsfield United (8)	138
63	Cinderford Town (8)	0–0 (4–2 p)	Bideford (8)	91
64	Cirencester Town (8)	5–1	Kidlington (8)	177
65	Thame United (8)	3–0	Lymington Town (8)	111
66	Larkhall Athletic (8)	3–1	Slimbridge (8)	140
67	Thatcham Town (8)	1–1 (3–2 p)	Sholing (8)	143
68	AFC Totton (8)	6–0	Barnstaple Town (8)	285
69	Highworth Town (8)	3–5	Plymouth Parkway (8)	135

== Third round qualifying ==
The draw for the third qualifying round was made on 11 October 2021, and saw 87 clubs from tier 7 joining the 69 winners from the second qualifying round.

Tie	Home team (tier)	Score	Away team (tier)	Att.
Saturday 30 October 2021
1	Bridlington Town (8)	0–7	Marske United (8)	252
2	Marine (8)	0–0 (5–3 p)	South Shields (7)	750
3	Hebburn Town (8)	0–2	Warrington Town (7)	267
4	Morpeth Town (7)	4–2	Pickering Town (8)	262
5	Bootle (8)	1–1 (4–3 p)	Widnes (8)	221
6	Stalybridge Celtic (7)	4–1	Yorkshire Amateur (8)	269
7	Shildon (8)	0–1	Whitby Town (7)	342
8	Dunston (8)	2–2 (3–2 p)	Bamber Bridge (7)	227
9	Runcorn Linnets (8)	0–2	F.C. United of Manchester (7)	1,078
10	Buxton (7)	1–2	Colne (8)	324
11	Ashton United (7)	1–0	Atherton Collieries (7)	251
12	Witton Albion (7)	1–2	Lancaster City (7)	251
13	Hyde United (7)	1–2	Mossley (8)	609
14	Radcliffe (7)	3–1	Frickley Athletic (8)	306
15	Liversedge (8)	4–0	Scarborough Athletic (7)	571
16	Spalding United (8)	1–1 (2–4 p)	Tamworth (7)	320
17	Wisbech Town (8)	0–2	Biggleswade Town (7)	189
18	Lowestoft Town (7)	2–3	Yaxley (8)	297
19	Sutton Coldfield Town (8)	0–0 (5–4 p)	Newcastle Town (8)	148
20	Hitchin Town (7)	1–3	Leiston (7)	278
21	Redditch United (7)	0–1	Stourbridge (7)	356
22	Gainsborough Trinity (7)	3–0	Coalville Town (7)	422
23	Mickleover (7)	0–1	Grantham Town (7)	243
24	Chasetown (8)	2–1	Alvechurch (7)	530
25	Hednesford Town (7)	2–3	Peterborough Sports (7)	527
26	Royston Town (7)	2–1	Stratford Town (7)	280
27	Carlton Town (8)	2–2 (4–3 p)	Kidsgrove Athletic (8)	160
28	Sporting Khalsa (8)	1–4	Rushall Olympic (7)	259
29	Corby Town (8)	0–1	Banbury United (7)	427
30	Nantwich Town (7)	2–1	Barwell (7)	334
31	Soham Town Rangers (8)	0–3	Nuneaton Borough (7)	176
32	Matlock Town (7)	2–1	AFC Rushden & Diamonds (7)	533
33	St. Ives Town (7)	0–2	Needham Market (7)	119
34	Bedford Town (8)	3–1	Stafford Rangers (7)	454
35	Bromsgrove Sporting (7)	2–0	Ilkeston Town (8)	571
36	Basford United (7)	2–1	Leek Town (8)	208
37	Bishop's Stortford (7)	2–0	Lewes (7)	283
38	Faversham Town (8)	2–1	Leatherhead (7)	203
39	Margate (7)	2–0	Beaconsfield Town (7)	289
40	Herne Bay (8)	0–2	Binfield (8)	263

Tie	Home team (tier)	Score	Away team (tier)	Att.
42	East Thurrock United (7)	0–6	Kingstonian (7)	146
43	Hastings United (8)	1–3	Felixstowe & Walton United (8)	710
44	Enfield Town (7)	2–1	Metropolitan Police (7)	303
45	Witham Town (8)	1–3	Hanwell Town (8)	97
46	Farnborough (7)	4–1	Bowers & Pitsea (7)	320
47	Horsham (7)	2–3	Carshalton Athletic (7)	455
48	Chipstead (8)	2–1	Whitehawk (8)	76
49	Corinthian Casuals (7)	0–1	Cheshunt (7)	191
50	Merstham (7)	1–3	Welwyn Garden City (8)	137
51	Heybridge Swifts (8)	2–2 (1–4 p)	Hayes & Yeading United (7)	297
52	Marlow (8)	4–3	Westfield (8)	206
53	Potters Bar Town (7)	2–0	Haringey Borough (7)	181
54	Chertsey Town (8)	0–2	Worthing (7)	454
55	South Park (8)	0–1	Harrow Borough (7)	83
56	Folkestone Invicta (7)	2–1	Hendon (7)	618
57	Walton Casuals (7)	2–1	Great Wakering Rovers (8)	132
58	Wingate & Finchley (7)	1–1 (5–4 p)	Hornchurch (7)	152
60	Bedfont Sports (8)	2–1	Harlow Town (8)	89
61	Brentwood Town (8)	3–0	AFC Sudbury (8)	165
62	Northwood (8)	2–2 (5–6 p)	Berkhamsted (8)	119
63	Bognor Regis Town (7)	5–0	Waltham Abbey (8)	412
64	Chesham United (7)	1–1 (1–2 p)	Bracknell Town (8)	247
65	Uxbridge (8)	2–1	Basildon United (8)	97
66	Canvey Island (8)	3–0	Burgess Hill Town (8)	352
67	Weston-super-Mare (7)	3–2	Taunton Town (7)	480
68	Thame United (8)	2–4	Wimborne Town (7)	106
69	AFC Totton (8)	2–0	Dorchester Town (7)	379
70	Paulton Rovers (8)	1–5	Larkhall Athletic (8)	150
71	Gosport Borough (7)	1–2	Salisbury (7)	427
73	Yate Town (7)	0–2	Willand Rovers (8)	240
75	Frome Town (8)	3–2	Poole Town (7)	463
76	Plymouth Parkway (8)	1–0	Merthyr Town (7)	203
77	Cinderford Town (8)	2–2 (5–4 p)	Thatcham Town (8)	104
78	Hartley Wintney (7)	2–1	Melksham Town (8)	236
Sunday 31 October 2021
41	Cray Wanderers (7)	4–1	Kings Langley (7)	185
Tuesday 2 November 2021
59	Staines Town (8)	1–0	Brightlingsea Regent (7)	61
72	Truro City (7)	1–0	Cirencester Town (8)	102
Wednesday 3 November 2021
74	Tiverton Town (7)	1–1 (5–4 p)	Swindon Supermarine (7)	179

== First round proper ==
The draw for the first round proper was made on 1 November 2021, and featured the 78 winners from the third qualifying round with no additional teams.

Tie	Home team (tier)	Score	Away team (tier)	Att.
Saturday 13 November 2021
1	Radcliffe (7)	2–0	Nuneaton Borough (7)	505
2	Marske United (8)	3–2	F.C. United of Manchester (7)	1,006
3	Rushall Olympic (7)	0–4	Matlock Town (7)	348
4	Ashton United (7)	5–1	Sutton Coldfield Town (8)	252
5	Nantwich Town (7)	2–1	Grantham Town (7)	397
6	Warrington Town (7)	2–0	Chasetown (8)	603
7	Colne (8)	1–1 (3–4 p)	Tamworth (7)	294
8	Bromsgrove Sporting (7)	0–0 (3–4 p)	Morpeth Town (7)	605
9	Whitby Town (7)	5–0	Mossley (8)	569
10	Marine (8)	2–2 (5–4 p)	Dunston (8)	1,202
11	Carlton Town (8)	1–2	Stourbridge (7)	271
12	Bootle (8)	3–3 (3–5 p)	Stalybridge Celtic (7)	383
13	Gainsborough Trinity (7)	1–2	Lancaster City (7)	319
14	Liversedge (8)	3–2	Basford United (7)	808
15	Walton Casuals (7)	2–6	Uxbridge (8)	312
16	Canvey Island (8)	6–0	Yaxley (8)	452
17	Brentwood Town (8)	4–1	Staines Town (8)	420
18	Needham Market (7)	3–2	Margate (7)	176
19	Hayes & Yeading United (7)	0–3	Worthing (7)	296
20	Bishop's Stortford (7)	2–1	Chipstead (8)	334

Tie	Home team (tier)	Score	Away team (tier)	Att.
21	Royston Town (7)	1–1 (3–4 p)	Kingstonian (7)	406
22	Welwyn Garden City (8)	2–1	Carshalton Athletic (7)	181
23	Cheshunt (7)	1–0	Berkhamsted (8)	183
24	Bedford Town (8)	0–1	Potters Bar Town (7)	453
25	Leiston (7)	3–0	Harrow Borough (7)	184
26	Biggleswade Town (7)	1–2	Enfield Town (7)	397
27	Felixstowe & Walton United (8)	2–1	Peterborough Sports (7)	441
28	Hanwell Town (8)	1–0	Wingate & Finchley (7)	248
29	Cray Wanderers (7)	2–1	Bedfont Sports (8)	163
30	Folkestone Invicta (7)	2–1	Faversham Town (8)	708
31	Farnborough (7)	1–0	Banbury United (7)	402
32	Marlow (8)	2–2 (5–6 p)	Larkhall Athletic (8)	229
33	Weston-super-Mare (7)	1–2	Wimborne Town (7)	477
34	Hartley Wintney (7)	3–0	Willand Rovers (8)	240
35	Binfield (8)	3–0	Cinderford Town (8)	251
36	Bracknell Town (8)	1–3	Tiverton Town (7)	193
37	AFC Totton (8)	2–2 (4–2 p)	Frome Town (8)	329
39	Plymouth Parkway (8)	4–0	Salisbury (7)	398
Sunday 14 November 2021
38	Truro City (7)	1–1 (4–2 p)	Bognor Regis Town (7)	206

== Second round proper ==
The draw for the second round took place on 15 November 2021, featuring the 39 winners from the previous round as well as the 43 teams entering from the sixth tier.

Tie	Home team (tier)	Score	Away team (tier)	Att.
Saturday 27 November 2021
2	York City (6)	1–0	Blyth Spartans (6)	1,184
6	Warrington Town (7)	1–1 (3–5 p)	Morpeth Town (7)	491
7	Curzon Ashton (6)	2–1	Chester (6)	326
10	Radcliffe (7)	5–1	Tamworth (7)	384
12	AFC Fylde (6)	1–0	Gateshead (6)	466
14	Gloucester City (6)	3–0	Kettering Town (6)	271
15	Needham Market (7)	3–1	Welwyn Garden City (8)	202
16	Hereford (6)	1–1 (3–5 p)	Kidderminster Harriers (6)	1,615
17	Bishop's Stortford (7)	5–1	Leiston (7)	328
18	Leamington (6)	0–3	Alfreton Town (6)	242
19	Braintree Town (6)	3–1	Potters Bar Town (7)	136
20	Chelmsford City (6)	1–2	Cheshunt (7)	550
21	Oxford City (6)	1–4	St Albans City (6)	530
22	Felixstowe & Walton United (8)	0–4	AFC Telford United (6)	612
23	Brackley Town (6)	1–2	Boston United (6)	341
24	Hemel Hempstead Town (6)	1–1 (5–6 p)	Stourbridge (7)	674
25	Hungerford Town (6)	3–2	Welling United (6)	210
26	Cray Wanderers (7)	2–2 (5–3 p)	Ebbsfleet United (6)	366
27	Hanwell Town (8)	0–2	Enfield Town (7)	336
28	Slough Town (6)	1–0	Havant & Waterlooville (6)	373
29	Binfield (8)	2–3	Truro City (7)	151
30	Bath City (6)	0–0 (3–5 p)	Dartford (6)	736

Tie	Home team (tier)	Score	Away team (tier)	Att.
31	Concord Rangers (6)	0–5	AFC Totton (8)	173
33	Plymouth Parkway (8)	1–0	Hampton & Richmond Borough (6)	254
34	Canvey Island (8)	0–1	Tonbridge Angels (6)	363
35	Eastbourne Borough (6)	2–1	Tiverton Town (7)	298
36	Brentwood Town (8)	1–2	Dulwich Hamlet (6)	550
37	Chippenham Town (6)	0–1	Uxbridge (8)	193
38	Maidstone United (6)	1–1 (6–5 p)	Billericay Town (6)	813
39	Wimborne Town (7)	1–2	Larkhall Athletic (8)	226
40	Worthing (7)	0–2	Dorking Wanderers (6)	783
41	Hartley Wintney (7)	0–2	Folkestone Invicta (7)	207
Sunday 28 November 2021
32	Kingstonian (7)	4–1	Farnborough (7)	329
Tuesday 30 November 2021
3	Farsley Celtic (6)	1–0	Stalybridge Celtic (7)	123
4	Liversedge (8)	1–3	Lancaster City (7)	382
8	Southport (6)	1–1 (5–4 p)	Darlington (6)	429
9	Spennymoor Town (6)	0–0 (3–1 p)	Chorley (6)	387
11	Matlock Town (7)	3–2	Marske United (8)	391
13	Whitby Town (7)	0–1	Nantwich Town (7)	256
Wednesday 1 December 2021
1	Bradford (Park Avenue) (6)	3–3 (3–0 p)	Marine (8)	237
5	Ashton United (7)	1–2	Guiseley (6)	168

== Third round proper ==
The draw for the third round took place on 29 November 2021, with the winners of the 41 second round proper matches being joined by the 23 National League clubs.

Tie	Home team (tier)	Score	Away team (tier)	Att.
Saturday 18 December 2021
1	Boston United (6)	4–1	Kidderminster Harriers (6)	975
2	Matlock Town (7)	0–1	York City (6)	828
3	Stockport County (5)	4–0	Grimsby Town (5)	2,735
4	Stourbridge (7)	3–2	Telford United (6)	795
5	Morpeth Town (7)	3–3 (5–3 p)	Lancaster City (7)	457
6	Chesterfield (5)	W/O	Guiseley (6)	NA
Guiseley awarded a walkover due to a number of Chesterfield players testing positive for COVID-19, forcing them to forfeit.
7	King's Lynn Town (5)	2–1	Nantwich Town (7)	643
8	Notts County (5)	2–1	Altrincham (5)	1,248
9	Farsley Celtic (6)	0–3	Southport (6)	269
10	Wrexham (5)	5–0	Gloucester City (6)	1,823
12	AFC Fylde (6)	0–1	Solihull Moors (5)	1,143
13	Curzon Ashton (6)	1–3	Alfreton Town (6)	113
14	Radcliffe (7)	0–1	Spennymoor Town (6)	691
15	Eastleigh (5)	5–0	Enfield Town (7)	877
16	Cheshunt (7)	0–0 (4–3 p)	Bishop's Stortford (7)	387
17	Aldershot Town (5)	2–1	Kingstonian (7)	1,048
18	Cray Wanderers (7)	1–3	Dartford (6)	473

Tie	Home team (tier)	Score	Away team (tier)	Att.
19	Southend United (5)	2–1	Dorking Wanderers (6)	1,728
20	Larkhall Athletic (8)	2–1	AFC Totton (8)	300
21	St Albans City (6)	0–0 (6–5 p)	Braintree Town (6)	702
22	Dover Athletic (5)	0–1	Bromley (5)	457
23	Yeovil Town (5)	3–1	Woking (5)	1,493
25	Slough Town (6)	3–1	Eastbourne Borough (6)	400
26	Barnet (5)	2–3	Boreham Wood (5)	823
27	Tonbridge Angels (6)	2–1	Torquay United (5)	719
28	Hungerford Town (6)	0–1	Weymouth (5)	501
29	Needham Market (7)	2–1	Wealdstone (5)	432
30	Folkestone Invicta (7)	2–0	Uxbridge (8)	573
31	Plymouth Parkway (8)	1–1 (4–3 p)	Dulwich Hamlet (6)	394
32	Maidenhead United (5)	W/O	Maidstone United (6)	NA
Maidstone United awarded a walkover due to a number of Maidenhead United players testing positive for COVID-19, forcing them to forfeit.
Sunday 19 December 2021
24	Truro City (7)	1–1 (2–4 p)	Dagenham & Redbridge (5)	204
Tuesday 21 December 2021
11	Bradford (Park Avenue) (6)	3–3 (3–5 p)	FC Halifax Town (5)	866

== Fourth round proper ==
The draw for the fourth round took place on 20 December 2021 and was made up of the 32 winners from the previous round. Plymouth Parkway and Larkhall Athletic of the eighth tier were the lowest-ranked teams remaining.

Tie	Home team (tier)	Score	Away team (tier)	Att.
Saturday 15 January 2022
1	Alfreton Town (6)	1–1 (2–3 p)	FC Halifax Town (5)	488
2	Dagenham & Redbridge (5)	2–0	Southend United (5)	2,585
3	Wrexham (5)	5–1	Folkestone Invicta (7)	0 (Note: Match played behind closed doors due to Welsh Government COVID-19 restrictions.)
4	St Albans City (6)	0–3	Cheshunt (7)	947
5	York City (6)	1–0	Slough Town (6)	2,261
7	Tonbridge Angels (6)	1–1 (4–3 p)	King's Lynn Town (5)	835
8	Southport (6)	0–3	Solihull Moors (5)	941
9	Notts County (5)	2–1	Eastleigh (5)	2,609

Tie	Home team (tier)	Score	Away team (tier)	Att.
10	Dartford (6)	1–0	Weymouth (5)	725
11	Aldershot Town (5)	0–2	Bromley (5)	1,194
12	Boreham Wood (5)	1–1 (5–4 p)	Maidstone United (6)	602
13	Morpeth Town (7)	4–3	Boston United (6)	922
14	Yeovil Town (5)	1–1 (7–8 p)	Needham Market (7)	1,649
15	Stockport County (5)	3–0	Larkhall Athletic (8)	3,517
16	Spennymoor Town (6)	3–1	Plymouth Parkway (8)	670
Tuesday 18 January 2022
6	Stourbridge (7)	0–0 (2–0 p)	Guiseley (6)	376
Match played at Bromsgrove Sporting.

== Fifth round proper ==
The draw for the fifth round took place on 17 January 2022 and was made up of the 16 winners from the previous round. Cheshunt, Morpeth Town, Needham Market and Stourbridge of the seventh tier were the lowest-ranked teams remaining.

Tie	Home team (tier)	Score	Away team (tier)	Att.
Saturday 12 February 2022
1	York City (6)	3–2	Morpeth Town (7)	2,725
2	Tonbridge Angels (6)	1–1 (2–3 p)	Bromley (5)	2,061
3	Needham Market (7)	1–0	Dartford (6)	1,011
4	Stourbridge (7)	0–1	Solihull Moors (5)	1,762
5	Dagenham & Redbridge (5)	2–0	Spennymoor Town (6)	1,350
6	FC Halifax Town (5)	1–2	Notts County (5)	1,406
7	Wrexham (5)	3–0	Boreham Wood (5)	3,444
8	Stockport County (5)	1–0	Cheshunt (7)	3,340

== Quarter-finals ==
The draw for the quarter-finals took place on 14 February 2022 and was made up of the 8 winners from the previous round. Needham Market of the seventh tier were the lowest-ranked team remaining.

Tie	Home team (tier)	Score	Away team (tier)	Att.
Friday 11 March 2022
3	Notts County (5)	1–2	Wrexham (5)	3,170
Saturday 12 March 2022
1	Bromley (5)	3–1	Solihull Moors (5)	1,965
2	Needham Market (7)	0–3	Stockport County (5)	1,526
4	Dagenham & Redbridge (5)	1–1 (6–7 p)	York City (6)	2,417

== Semi-finals ==
The draw for the semi-finals took place on 14 March 2022 and featured the four winners from the previous round. York City of the sixth tier were the lowest-ranked team remaining.

2 April 2022
12:30

Wrexham (5)	2–0	Stockport County (5)
Mullin 90+1', 90+5'	Report

Racecourse Ground, Wrexham
Attendance: 8,703

2 April 2022
15:00

Bromley (5)	3–1	York City (6)
Cheek 61', 81'; Alabi 90+2'	Report	Willoughby 2'

Hayes Lane, Bromley
Attendance: 4,423

== Final ==
22 May 2022
15:00

Wrexham (5)	0–1	Bromley (5)
	Report	Cheek 64'

Wembley Stadium, London
Attendance: 46,111
Referee: Thomas Bramall
