= Shrewton United F.C. =

Association football club in England

Coordinates: 51°12′01.43″N 1°54′10.44″W

Shrewton United
- Full name: Shrewton United Football Club
- Nickname: The Shrews
- Founded: 1946
- Ground: The Recreation Ground, Shrewton
- Capacity: 700
- Chairman: S. Withers
- 2024–25: Wiltshire League Premier Division, 5th of 18
Home colours	Away colours

Shrewton United Football Club is a football club based in Shrewton, near Amesbury, in Wiltshire, England. They are currently members of the and play at the Recreation Ground.

== History ==
The club was formed in 1946. They entered the Wiltshire Football League and won Division Three in 1977–78, 1978–79 and 1980–81. After finishing runners-up in Division One in 1990–91 and 1992–93, the club won the league in 1996–97. The division was renamed the Premier Division in 1998, and in the following seasons they finished runners-up twice. They won the Wiltshire Football League Premier Division in 2001–02 and 2002–03. After the second title, they were accepted into the Western League Division One but returned to the Wiltshire League at the end of the 2012–13 season.

== Ground ==
Shrewton United play their home games at the Recreation Ground, Mill Lane, Shrewton, SP3 4JY.

== Honours ==
- Wiltshire Football League Premier Division (formerly Division One)
  - Champions 1996–97, 2001–02, 2002–03
  - Runners-up 1990–91, 1992–93, 1998–99, 2000–01
- Wiltshire Football League Division Three
  - Champions 1977–78, 1978–79, 1980–81

== Records ==
- FA Cup
  - Extra Preliminary Round 2011–12
- FA Vase
  - First Round 2006–07, 2011–12

== Former players ==
One of Shrewton's most famous former players, still active in the game, is Brighton's first team coach Alex Penny, who played over 200 games for the club between 1990–93 and 1997–99.
