= Melksham Town F.C. =

Association football club in England

Coordinates: 51.3677°N 2.1170°W

Melksham Town
- Full name: Melksham Town Football Club
- Nickname: Town
- Founded: 1876
- Ground: Oakfield Stadium, Melksham
- Manager: Kieran Baggs
- League: Southern League Division One South
- 2025–26: Southern League Division One South, 18th of 22
Home colours	Away colours

Melksham Town Football Club is a football club based in Melksham, Wiltshire, England. Affiliated to the Wiltshire Football Association, they are currently members of the Southern League Division One South and play at the Oakfield Stadium.

== History ==
The club was established as Melksham Football Club in 1876. In 1894 they were founder members of the Wiltshire League. The club were Division One champions in 1903–04 and won the Wiltshire Senior Cup the following season. In 1920 the club was renamed Melksham & Avon United as a result of their new ground being owned by Avon Rubber, before reverting to their original name in the 1926–27 season. They were runners-up in the league in 1924–25, 1929–30 and 1936–37. In 1951 the club adopted their current name and went on to finish as runners-up in Division One in 1959–60 and 1971–72, also winning the Wiltshire Senior Cup again in 1969–70.

Melksham moved up to the Western League in 1974. After finishing third-from bottom of the league in 1975–76, the club were demoted to the new Division One as the league expanded to two divisions. They won the Wiltshire Senior Cup again in 1977–78 and were Division One champions in 1979–80, earning promotion to the Premier Division. Their first season in the Premier Division saw the club win the Wiltshire Premier Shield, a trophy they retained the following season and won again in 1984–85 and 1985–86. However, they were relegated to Division One again at the end of the 1987–88 season.

In 1992–93 Melksham finished bottom of Division One and were relegated to the Premier Division of the Wiltshire Football League. They won the Premier Division and the Senior Knock-Out Cup the following season, and were promoted back to the Western League at the first attempt. In 1996–97 the club were Division One champions and were promoted to the Premier Division. They won the Wiltshire Premier Shield the following season, and again in 1999–2000, before winning the Wiltshire Senior Cup in 2002–03 and 2007–08. Although the club were relegated to Division One in 2009–10, they were Division One runners-up in 2010–11, earning promotion back to the Premier Division.

Melksham won the Wiltshire Senior Cup in 2012–13 and 2013–14, before winning the Western League Premier Division title in 2014–15. However, delays to making ground improvements meant that they were denied promotion. The following season saw the club win the Senior Cup again. The club were runners-up in the Premier Division in 2017–18, earning promotion to Division One South of the Southern League.

== Ground ==
The club played at Challymead Common until moving to the Old Bear Field in 1883. They relocated to the Conigre in 1920; the ground was part of the Melksham House estate, centrally sited in the town, which had been purchased in the same year by Avon Rubber, with the house turned into a social club. A wooden stand was erected on one side of the pitch and wooden fencing installed around the ground. During the 1960s covered stands were built behind the Rugby Club End and on the other side of the pitch, and floodlights were installed in 1986. The wooden stand was demolished in the early 1990s and replaced by a modern metal stand in 1994.

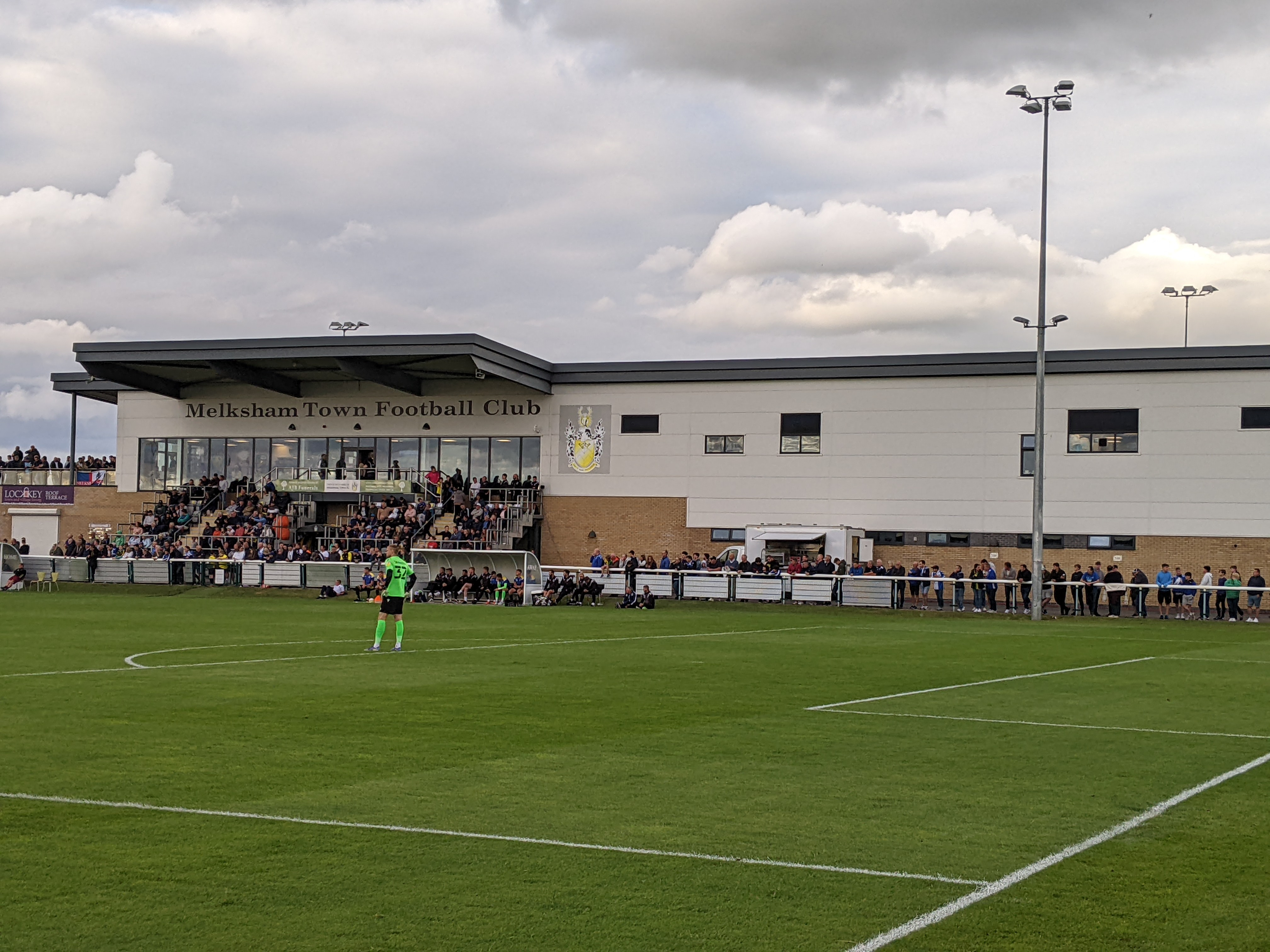
Oakfield Stadium in Melksham

In 2017, in preparation for redevelopment at the Melksham House site, the club moved to Oakfields, a new £7.3 million facility shared with Melksham Rugby Club on the eastern edge of the town. The first match at the new ground was played on 14 January 2017 against Bristol Manor Farm in the FA Vase, with the visitors winning 5–3 in front of a crowd of 1,215.

== Honours ==
- Western League
  - Premier Division champions 2014–15
  - Division One champions 1979–80, 1996–97
- Wiltshire Football League
  - Premier Division champions 1993–94
  - Senior Knock-Out Cup winners 1993–94
- Wiltshire League
  - Division One champions 1903–04
- Wiltshire Premier Shield
  - Winners 1980–81, 1981–82, 1984–85, 1985–86, 1997–98, 1999–2000
- Wiltshire Senior Cup
  - Winners 1904–05, 1969–70, 1977–78, 2002–03, 2007–08, 2012–13, 2013–14, 2015–16

== Records ==
- Best FA Cup performance: Third qualifying round, 1954–55, 1957–58, 2024–25
- Best FA Trophy performance: Third qualifying round, 2021–22, 2022–23
- Best FA Vase performance: Quarter-finals, 2017–18
- Record attendance: 2,821 vs Trowbridge Town, 1957
- Most goals in a season: Gareth Lewis, 72 (1968–69)

== See also ==
- Melksham Town F.C. players
