= Willand Rovers F.C. =

English football club

Coordinates: 50°53′17″N 3°22′13″W

Willand Rovers
- Full name: Willand Rovers Association Football Club
- Nicknames: Rovers; Devon All-Whites
- Founded: 1946; 80 years ago
- Ground: Silver Street, Willand
- Capacity: 1,000
- Chairman: Mike Hawkins
- Manager: Ben Watson
- League: Southern League Division One South
- 2025–26: Southern League Division One South, 19th of 22
| Home colours | Away colours |

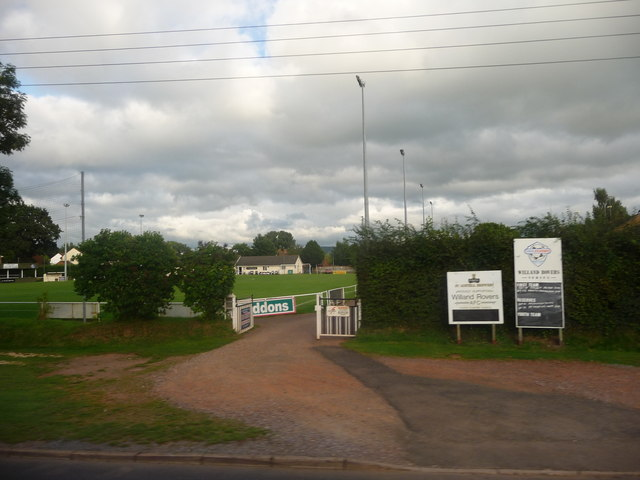
The ground

Willand Rovers Football Club is a football club based in Willand, near Exeter, in Devon. They are currently members of the Southern League Division One South and play at Silver Street. The club is affiliated to the Devon County Football Association.

== History ==
Willand Rovers Football Club was formed in 1946, after the financial collapse of Willand Wanderers FC, (formed in 1907), during the Second World War. The club moved to their present home of Silver Street in the 1950s and were playing in the Devon and Exeter Football League. The club, in 1990, was relegated to the Senior Division of the Devon and Exeter Football League as their ground was not considered up to the standard of the premier division. However, the club went back to the premier division for the 1991–92 season.

For the start of the 1992–93 season, they were among the founder members of the Devon League. They went on to win the winning that league twice before gaining promotion to the Western League Division One in 2001. They won the Western League Division One title in 2004–05, earning another promotion to the Western League Premier Division where they have finished in the top six during each of their seasons at that level. Willand Rovers made it to the Les Phillips Cup Final in 2006, losing to Corsham Town, but went one better in 2007, winning the Cup after a final against Welton Rovers. They reached the Fifth Round of the FA Vase in 2009–10.

== Ground ==
Willand Rovers play their home games at Silver Street, Willand, Cullompton, EX15 2RG.

== Honours ==
=== League honours ===
- Western Football League Premier Division
  - Runners-up (1): 2009–10
- Western Football League Division One
  - Champions (1): 2004–05
- Devon County League
  - Champions (2): 1998–99, 2000–01

=== Cup honours ===
- Devon St Lukes Bowl:
  - Runners-up (1): 2007–08
- Les Phillips Cup:
  - Winners (3): 2006–07, 2012–13, 2014–15
  - Runners-up (1): 2005–06

== Records ==
- Highest League Position: 1st Champions in Western Football League Premier Division 2018/19
- FA Cup best performance: Fourth Qualifying Round, 2014–15
- FA Trophy best performance: First round, 2021–22, 2022–23
- FA Vase best performance: Quarter final, 2018-19
