= Larkhall Athletic F.C. =

Association football club in England

Coordinates: 51°24′12″N 2°20′59″W

Larkhall Athletic
- Full name: Larkhall Athletic Football Club
- Nickname: The Larks
- Founded: 1914
- Ground: Plain Ham, Bath
- Capacity: 1,429
- Chairman: Paul Rankin
- Manager: Charlie Griffin
- League: Southern League Division One South
- 2025–26: Southern League Division One South, 9th of 22
Home colours	Away colours

Larkhall Athletic Football Club is a football club based in the Larkhall area of Bath, Somerset, England. Affiliated to the Somerset County FA, they are currently members of the Southern League Division One South and play at the Plain Ham ground.

== History ==
The club was founded in 1914. They were in abeyance during the 1940s after losing use of the Plain Ham ground, but returned to footballing activity in 1951. The club won the Somerset Junior Cup in 1962–63, and joined the Somerset Senior League in the 1970s. The club won the League Cup in 1974–75 and the Somerset Senior Cup the following season. In 1976 the Western League formed a new Division One, with Larkhall becoming founder members. In 1988–89 they were Division One champions, but were unable to take promotion. They won the Somerset Senior Cup for a second time in 2003–04, and after winning Division One again in 2008–09 the club were promoted to the Premier Division.

In 2010–11 Larkhall were Premier Division champions, but were denied promotion to the Southern League due to ground grading requirements. In 2013–14 they won both the Premier Division and the league's Les Phillips Cup, and were able to take promotion to Division One South & West of the Southern League. In their first season in the Southern League the club finished fifth, qualifying for the promotion play-offs; after beating Evesham United 3–0 in the semi-finals, they lost 3–2 to Stratford Town in the final.

== Ground ==
The club has played at the Plain Ham ground since their formation, initially renting it on a match-by-match basis. A longer lease was secured from Bath City Council in 1962 and a clubhouse built in 1965. Floodlights were installed in 2004 and the club bought the freehold of the site the following year. In 2008 55 seats were installed, with the amount of covered standing tripled.

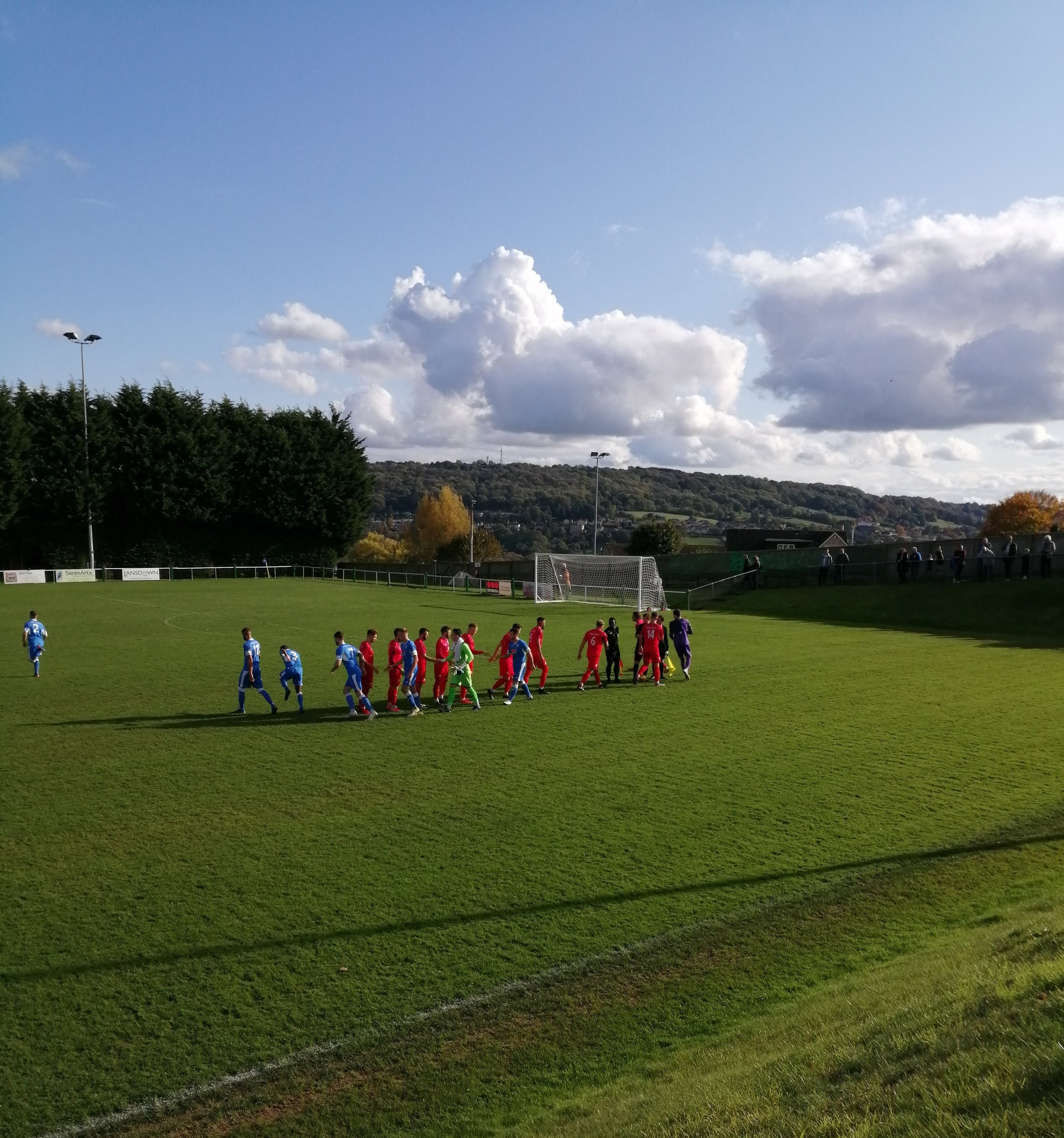
League game against Frome Town at Plain Ham in 2019

== Honours ==
- Western League
  - Premier Division champions 2010–11, 2013–14
  - Les Phillips Cup winners 2013–14
  - Division One champions 1988–89, 2008–09
- Somerset Senior League
  - League Cup winners 1974–75
- Somerset Senior Cup
  - Winners 1975–76, 2003–04
- Somerset Junior Cup
  - Winners 1962–63

== Records ==
- Best FA Cup performance: Third qualifying round, 2020–21, 2024–25
- Best FA Trophy performance: Fourth round, 2021–22
- Best FA Vase performance: Fifth round, 2011–12, 2012–13, 2013–14
- Record attendance: 1,000 vs Bath City, FA Cup second qualifying round, 16 September 2023
- Biggest win: 9–1 vs Barnstaple Town, 2021
- Heaviest defeat: 10–2 vs Taunton Town, 2017
- Most appearances: Luke Scott

== See also ==
- Larkhall Athletic F.C. players
- Larkhall Athletic F.C. managers
