= 1920–21 Western Football League =

Western Football League
- Season: 1920–21
- Champions: Bristol City Reserves (Division One); Peasedown St John (Division Two)

The 1920–21 season was the 24th in the history of the Western Football League.

The Division One champions this season were Bristol City Reserves, for the second time in their history. Champions of Division Two were Peasedown St John, who gained promotion to Division One along with Trowbridge Town.

== Division One ==
Eight new clubs joined Division One this season, and the number of clubs increased from 10 to 16 after Horfield United and Newport County Reserves left the league.

- Abertillery Town
- Cardiff City Reserves, rejoining the league after leaving in 1914
- Cardiff Corinthians
- Exeter City Reserves
- Mid Rhondda
- Pontypridd
- Ton Pentre, rejoining the league after leaving in 1910
- Yeovil and Petters United, promoted from Division Two

Abertillery Town, Mid Rhondda, Pontypridd and Ton Pentre were also members of the Southern League (Welsh section) during this season. All four clubs left the Western League at the end of the season to concentrate on the Southern League.

Pos	Team	Pld	W	D	L	GF	GA	GR	Pts	Result
1	Bristol City Reserves	30	18	5	7	58	27	2.148	41	Moved to the Southern League English Section
2	Cardiff City Reserves	30	20	1	9	64	42	1.524	41	Left at the end of the season
3	Abertillery Town	30	16	7	7	61	35	1.743	39	Left at the end of the season
4	Swansea Town Reserves	30	15	8	7	60	29	2.069	38	Moved to the Southern League Welsh Section
5	Douglas	30	15	8	7	52	32	1.625	38	Left at the end of the season
6	Pontypridd	30	15	6	9	60	40	1.500	36	Left at the end of the season
7	Yeovil and Petters United	30	13	6	11	52	46	1.130	32	
8	Bath City	30	12	7	11	45	45	1.000	31	Moved to the Southern League English Section
9	Swindon Town Reserves	30	12	6	12	62	50	1.240	30	Moved to the Southern League English Section
10	Exeter City Reserves	30	10	9	11	48	53	0.906	29	Moved to the Southern League English Section
11	Bristol Rovers Reserves	30	10	5	15	46	53	0.868	25	Moved to the Southern League English Section
12	Ton Pentre	30	10	5	15	43	60	0.717	25	Left at the end of the season
13	Welton Rovers	30	9	6	15	39	67	0.582	24	
14	Mid Rhondda	30	8	6	16	23	57	0.404	22	Left at the end of the season
15	Barry Reserves	30	6	5	19	33	72	0.458	17	Left at the end of the season
16	Cardiff Corinthians	30	4	4	22	24	62	0.387	12	

== Division Two ==
Three new clubs joined Division Two this season, and the number of clubs increased from eight to ten after Yeovil and Petters United were promoted.

- Clandown
- Radstock Town, rejoining the league after leaving in 1910
- Welton Amateurs

Pos	Team	Pld	W	D	L	GF	GA	GR	Pts	Promotion
1	Peasedown St John (P)	18	13	3	2	34	12	2.833	29	Promotion to Division One
2	Radstock Town	18	10	4	4	31	23	1.348	24	
3	Trowbridge Town (P)	18	10	3	5	36	18	2.000	23	Promotion to Division One
4	Paulton Rovers	18	9	4	5	33	26	1.269	22	
5	Timsbury Athletic	18	6	4	8	22	27	0.815	16	
6	Street	18	7	2	9	21	35	0.600	16	
7	Frome Town	18	5	3	10	26	30	0.867	13	
8	Glastonbury	18	5	3	10	17	28	0.607	13	
9	Clandown	18	5	3	10	13	24	0.542	13	
10	Welton Amateurs	18	2	7	9	20	30	0.667	11	

Rules for classification: The system of using goal average to separate two teams tied on points was used up to and including the 1976–77 season. The points system: 2 points for a win, 1 point for a draw and 0 points for losing.
(P) Promoted
