= 1936–37 Western Football League =

Western Football League
- Season: 1936–37
- Champions: Bristol Rovers Reserves (Division One); Weymouth (Division Two)

The 1936–37 season was the 40th in the history of the Western Football League.

The Division One champions for the fourth time in their history and for the second consecutive season were Bristol Rovers Reserves. The winners of Division Two were Weymouth. There was again no promotion or relegation between the two divisions this season.

== Division One ==
After Bath City and Cardiff City Reserves left the league, Division One was reduced from six to five clubs, with one new club joining.

- Bristol City Reserves, rejoining after leaving the league in 1933.

Pos	Team	Pld	W	D	L	GF	GA	GR	Pts
1	Bristol Rovers Reserves	8	6	0	2	26	15	1.733	12
2	Yeovil and Petters United	8	5	1	2	23	12	1.917	11
3	Bristol City Reserves	8	4	2	2	18	15	1.200	10
4	Torquay United Reserves	8	2	0	6	13	24	0.542	4
5	Lovells Athletic	8	1	1	6	11	25	0.440	3

== Division Two ==
Division Two remained at eighteen clubs after Bath City Reserves left and one new club joined:

- Yeovil and Petters United Reserves, rejoining after leaving the league in 1929.

Pos	Team	Pld	W	D	L	GF	GA	GR	Pts	Result
1	Weymouth	34	27	4	3	144	38	3.789	58	
2	Swindon Town Reserves	34	27	4	3	139	49	2.837	58	Left at the end of the season
3	Salisbury City	34	20	9	5	97	45	2.156	49	
4	Trowbridge Town	34	22	3	9	89	62	1.435	47	
5	Portland United	34	21	3	10	115	60	1.917	45	
6	Street	34	18	4	12	90	73	1.233	40	
7	Wells City	34	14	9	11	65	60	1.083	37	
8	Radstock Town	34	15	7	12	91	92	0.989	37	
9	Warminster Town	34	14	7	13	64	69	0.928	35	
10	Glastonbury	34	14	3	17	92	98	0.939	31	
11	Frome Town	34	9	7	18	68	94	0.723	25	
12	Chippenham Town	34	11	3	20	71	98	0.724	25	
13	Bristol City "A"	34	11	2	21	62	90	0.689	24	
14	Bristol Rovers "A"	34	8	7	19	84	112	0.750	23	
15	Yeovil and Petters United Reserves	34	9	5	20	80	131	0.611	23	
16	Welton Rovers	34	11	0	23	60	116	0.517	22	
17	Poole Town	34	8	3	23	51	95	0.537	19	
18	Paulton Rovers	34	5	4	25	46	126	0.365	14	

Rules for classification: The system of using goal average to separate two teams tied on points was used up to and including the 1976–77 season. The points system: 2 points for a win, 1 point for a draw and 0 points for losing.
