= 1933–34 Western Football League =

Western Football League
- Season: 1933–34
- Champions: Bath City Reserves (Division One); Weymouth (Division Two)

The 1933–34 season was the 37th in the history of the Western Football League.

The Division One champions for the first time in their history were Bath City. The winners of Division Two were Weymouth. There was again no promotion or relegation between the two divisions this season. The original Taunton Town club (not the current incarnation) became the first club in the history of the Western League to complete a season and lose all their games. The club disbanded after the end of the season.

== Division One ==
After Bristol City Reserves and Cardiff City Reserves left the league, Division One was reduced from nine to seven clubs, with no new clubs joining.

Pos	Team	Pld	W	D	L	GF	GA	GR	Pts	Result
1	Bath City Reserves	12	8	2	2	33	14	2.357	18	
2	Torquay United Reserves	12	6	3	3	31	17	1.824	15	
3	Bristol Rovers Reserves	12	7	1	4	40	22	1.818	15	
4	Yeovil and Petters United	12	5	3	4	22	21	1.048	13	
5	Lovells Athletic	12	5	2	5	21	20	1.050	12	
6	Exeter City Reserves	12	5	1	6	25	31	0.806	11	
7	Taunton Town	12	0	0	12	10	57	0.175	0	Disbanded at the end of the season

== Division Two ==
Division Two remained at eighteen clubs with no clubs leaving or joining.

Pos	Team	Pld	W	D	L	GF	GA	GR	Pts	Result
1	Weymouth	34	20	7	7	101	54	1.870	47	
2	Bath City Reserves	34	20	7	7	101	53	1.906	47 (Note: To decide the Division Two championship, a play-off was arranged between Weymouth and Bath City Reserves. Weymouth won the match and were declared champions.)	
3	Swindon Town Reserves	34	20	6	8	99	61	1.623	46	
4	Salisbury City	34	18	7	9	71	37	1.919	43	
5	Portland United	34	17	6	11	99	73	1.356	40	
6	Glastonbury	34	17	5	12	99	70	1.414	39	
7	Street	34	16	5	13	98	89	1.101	37	
8	Poole Town	34	14	8	12	83	66	1.258	36	Left at the end of the season
9	Welton Rovers	34	15	5	14	77	82	0.939	35	
10	Paulton Rovers	34	14	5	15	73	75	0.973	33	
11	Radstock Town	34	13	6	15	67	70	0.957	32	
12	Trowbridge Town	34	12	8	14	62	86	0.721	32	
13	Wells City	34	11	9	14	69	85	0.812	31	
14	Bristol City "A"	34	10	8	16	60	79	0.759	28	
15	Frome Town	34	10	8	16	74	96	0.771	28	
16	Chippenham Town	34	11	3	20	73	95	0.768	25	
17	Warminster Town	34	6	5	23	43	95	0.453	17	
18	Bristol St George	34	7	2	25	62	145	0.428	16	

Rules for classification: The system of using goal average to separate two teams tied on points was used up to and including the 1976–77 season. The points system: 2 points for a win, 1 point for a draw and 0 points for losing.
