= 1938–39 Western Football League =

Western Football League
- Season: 1938–39
- Champions: Lovells Athletic (Division One); Trowbridge Town (Division Two)

The 1938–39 season was the 42nd in the history of the Western Football League.

The Division One champions for the second time were Lovells Athletic, after finishing bottom the previous season. The winners of Division Two for the second consecutive season were Trowbridge Town. There was again no promotion or relegation between the two divisions this season, and the league was restructured before the 1939–40 season following the outbreak of World War II.

== Division One ==
Division One was increased from five to six clubs, with one new club joining:

- Bath City, rejoining after leaving the league in 1936.

Pos	Team	Pld	W	D	L	GF	GA	GR	Pts	Result
1	Lovells Athletic	10	7	2	1	27	14	1.929	16	Left at the end of the season
2	Yeovil and Petters United	10	6	2	2	32	20	1.600	14	Left at the end of the season
3	Bristol City Reserves	10	4	1	5	24	24	1.000	9	
4	Bath City Reserves	10	2	5	3	16	22	0.727	9	Left at the end of the season
5	Torquay United Reserves	10	2	4	4	14	17	0.824	8	Left at the end of the season
6	Bristol Rovers Reserves	10	1	2	7	9	25	0.360	4	Left at the end of the season

== Division Two ==
Division Two remained at eighteen clubs with no clubs leaving or joining.

Pos	Team	Pld	W	D	L	GF	GA	GR	Pts	Result
1	Trowbridge Town	34	27	3	4	166	49	3.388	57	
2	Yeovil and Petters United Reserves	34	22	4	8	112	66	1.697	48	Left at the end of the season
3	Street	34	21	5	8	93	57	1.632	47	Left at the end of the season
4	Poole Town	34	21	4	9	106	67	1.582	46	Left at the end of the season
5	Weymouth	34	19	5	10	105	51	2.059	43	Left at the end of the season
6	Radstock Town	34	19	5	10	97	64	1.516	43	
7	Portland United	34	18	4	12	107	64	1.672	40	Left at the end of the season
8	Bristol City "A"	34	17	6	11	87	58	1.500	40	Left at the end of the season
9	Welton Rovers	34	14	4	16	64	118	0.542	32	
10	Glastonbury	34	13	5	16	76	89	0.854	31	
11	Frome Town	34	11	9	14	76	104	0.731	31	Left at the end of the season
12	Bath City Reserves	34	8	8	18	64	100	0.640	24	
13	Wells City	34	10	3	21	63	104	0.606	23	
14	Warminster Town	34	8	7	19	48	105	0.457	23	Left at the end of the season
15	Bristol Rovers "A"	34	9	4	21	58	92	0.630	22	Left at the end of the season
16	Paulton Rovers	34	8	6	20	57	117	0.487	22	
17	Salisbury City	34	7	7	20	50	93	0.538	21	Left at the end of the season
18	Chippenham Town	34	8	3	23	56	87	0.644	19	

Rules for classification: The system of using goal average to separate two teams tied on points was used up to and including the 1976–77 season. The points system: 2 points for a win, 1 point for a draw and 0 points for losing.
