= 1935–36 Western Football League =

Western Football League
- Season: 1935–36
- Champions: Bristol Rovers Reserves (Division One); Swindon Town Reserves (Division Two)

The 1935–36 season was the 39th in the history of the Western Football League.

The Division One champions for the third time in their history were Bristol Rovers Reserves. The winners of Division Two were Swindon Town Reserves for the second consecutive season. There was again no promotion or relegation between the two divisions this season.

== Division One ==
After Exeter City Reserves left the league, Division One was reduced from seven to six clubs, with no new clubs joining.

Pos	Team	Pld	W	D	L	GF	GA	GR	Pts	Result
1	Bristol Rovers Reserves	10	5	4	1	29	22	1.318	14	
2	Lovells Athletic	10	4	4	2	17	18	0.944	12	
3	Torquay United Reserves	10	4	3	3	28	20	1.400	11	
4	Bath City Reserves	10	3	3	4	15	16	0.938	9	Left at the end of the season
5	Cardiff City Reserves	10	3	3	4	13	18	0.722	9	Left at the end of the season
6	Yeovil and Petters United	10	1	3	6	22	30	0.733	5	

== Division Two ==
Division Two remained at eighteen clubs after Bristol St George left and one new club joined:

- Poole Town, rejoining after leaving the league in 1934.

Pos	Team	Pld	W	D	L	GF	GA	GR	Pts	Result
1	Swindon Town Reserves	34	28	4	2	140	40	3.500	60	
2	Weymouth	34	22	4	8	116	54	2.148	48	
3	Street	34	21	5	8	106	54	1.963	47	
4	Frome Town	34	17	5	12	92	86	1.070	39	
5	Bath City Reserves	34	14	10	10	93	78	1.192	38	Left at the end of the season
6	Portland United	34	16	6	12	95	82	1.159	38	
7	Glastonbury	34	15	7	12	97	72	1.347	37	
8	Poole Town	34	16	5	13	77	89	0.865	37	
9	Paulton Rovers	34	14	8	12	69	77	0.896	36	
10	Radstock Town	34	15	5	14	77	80	0.963	35	
11	Salisbury City	34	13	8	13	60	65	0.923	34	
12	Bristol City "A"	34	14	3	17	71	76	0.934	31	
13	Wells City	34	12	7	15	61	72	0.847	31	
14	Trowbridge Town	34	12	6	16	87	91	0.956	30	
15	Warminster Town	34	9	4	21	58	103	0.563	22	
16	Bristol Rovers "A"	34	8	5	21	57	78	0.731	21	
17	Welton Rovers	34	5	5	24	49	125	0.392	15	
18	Chippenham Town	34	6	1	27	64	147	0.435	13	

Rules for classification: The system of using goal average to separate two teams tied on points was used up to and including the 1976–77 season. The points system: 2 points for a win, 1 point for a draw and 0 points for losing.
