= 1934–35 Western Football League =

Western Football League
- Season: 1934–35
- Champions: Yeovil and Petters United (Division One); Swindon Town Reserves (Division Two)

The 1934–35 season was the 38th in the history of the Western Football League.

The Division One champions for the fourth time in their history were Yeovil and Petters United. The winners of Division Two were Swindon Town Reserves. There was again no promotion or relegation between the two divisions this season.

== Division One ==
After Taunton Town left the league, Division One remained at seven clubs, with one new club joining:

- Cardiff City Reserves, rejoining after leaving the league in 1933.

Pos	Team	Pld	W	D	L	GF	GA	GR	Pts	Result
1	Yeovil and Petters United	12	9	1	2	38	21	1.810	19	
2	Bath City Reserves	12	7	2	3	32	16	2.000	16	
3	Bristol Rovers Reserves	12	6	3	3	34	21	1.619	15	
4	Torquay United Reserves	12	4	2	6	25	25	1.000	10	
5	Cardiff City Reserves	12	3	3	6	19	30	0.633	9	
6	Exeter City Reserves	12	2	4	6	18	26	0.692	8	Left at the end of the season
7	Lovells Athletic	12	3	1	8	15	42	0.357	7	

== Division Two ==
Division Two remained at eighteen clubs after Poole Town left and one new club joined:

- Bristol Rovers "A"

Pos	Team	Pld	W	D	L	GF	GA	GR	Pts	Result
1	Swindon Town Reserves	34	25	5	4	108	33	3.273	55	
2	Salisbury City	34	21	6	7	86	41	2.098	48	
3	Portland United	34	22	3	9	105	65	1.615	47	
4	Weymouth	34	19	8	7	107	39	2.744	46	
5	Frome Town	34	19	7	8	113	67	1.687	45	
6	Bath City Reserves	34	18	5	11	85	52	1.635	41	
7	Glastonbury	34	15	9	10	91	68	1.338	39	
8	Street	34	14	8	12	83	65	1.277	36	
9	Trowbridge Town	34	14	7	13	79	84	0.940	35	
10	Bristol City "A"	34	15	4	15	87	69	1.261	34	
11	Paulton Rovers	34	13	7	14	60	70	0.857	33	
12	Bristol Rovers "A"	34	15	0	19	68	88	0.773	30	
13	Welton Rovers	34	10	8	16	71	84	0.845	28	
14	Warminster Town	34	11	4	19	63	112	0.563	26	
15	Wells City	34	10	5	19	70	83	0.843	25	
16	Radstock Town	34	6	7	21	48	101	0.475	19	
17	Chippenham Town	34	7	3	24	53	126	0.421	17	
18	Bristol St George	34	2	4	28	43	173	0.249	8	Left at the end of the season

Rules for classification: The system of using goal average to separate two teams tied on points was used up to and including the 1976–77 season. The points system: 2 points for a win, 1 point for a draw and 0 points for losing.
