= 1931–32 Western Football League =

Western Football League
- Season: 1931–32
- Champions: Plymouth Argyle Reserves (Division One); Portland United (Division Two)

The 1931–32 season was the 35th in the history of the Western Football League.

The Division One champions for the second time in their history were Plymouth Argyle Reserves, although they left the league at the end of the season. The winners of Division Two were Portland United for the second season running. There was again no promotion or relegation between the two divisions this season.

== Division One ==
Division One was increased from seven to eight clubs, with one new club joining:

- Lovells Athletic, rejoining after leaving the league in 1928.

Pos	Team	Pld	W	D	L	GF	GA	GR	Pts	Result
1	Plymouth Argyle Reserves	14	10	1	3	41	15	2.733	21	Left at the end of the season
2	Yeovil and Petters United	14	8	3	3	42	26	1.615	19	
3	Lovells Athletic	14	7	3	4	33	25	1.320	17	
4	Bristol Rovers Reserves	14	8	0	6	32	28	1.143	16	
5	Torquay United Reserves	14	5	4	5	29	35	0.829	14	
6	Bristol City Reserves	14	4	3	7	26	37	0.703	11	
7	Exeter City Reserves	14	4	1	9	23	37	0.622	9	
8	Taunton Town	14	2	1	11	18	41	0.439	5	

== Division Two ==
Division Two was increased from seventeen to eighteen clubs after Petters Westland left after just one season, and two new clubs joined:

- Frome Town, rejoining after leaving the league in 1927.
- Glastonbury, rejoining after leaving the league in 1922.

Pos	Team	Pld	W	D	L	GF	GA	GR	Pts	Result
1	Portland United	34	27	1	6	122	55	2.218	55	
2	Salisbury City	34	23	5	6	122	50	2.440	51	
3	Bath City Reserves	34	23	4	7	104	53	1.962	50	
4	Trowbridge Town	34	19	5	10	103	68	1.515	43	
5	Bristol City "A"	34	19	2	13	124	89	1.393	40	
6	Street	34	17	4	13	100	84	1.190	38	
7	Paulton Rovers	34	17	3	14	78	59	1.322	37	
8	Frome Town	34	18	1	15	86	105	0.819	37	
9	Poole Town	34	16	4	14	81	82	0.988	36	
10	Wells City	34	15	5	14	119	89	1.337	35	
11	Weymouth	34	13	4	17	86	103	0.835	30	
12	Chippenham Town	34	11	6	17	99	105	0.943	28	
13	Bristol St George	34	12	4	18	74	110	0.673	28	
14	Welton Rovers	34	10	7	17	72	90	0.800	27	
15	Glastonbury	34	12	2	20	86	113	0.761	26	
16	Radstock Town	34	9	5	20	64	101	0.634	23	
17	Warminster Town	34	8	6	20	68	119	0.571	22	
18	Coleford Athletic	34	1	4	29	43	156	0.276	6	Left at the end of the season

Rules for classification: The system of using goal average to separate two teams tied on points was used up to and including the 1976–77 season. The points system: 2 points for a win, 1 point for a draw and 0 points for losing.
