= 1932–33 Western Football League =

Western Football League
- Season: 1932–33
- Champions: Exeter City Reserves (Division One); Swindon Town Reserves (Division Two)

The 1932–33 season was the 36th in the history of the Western Football League.

The Division One champions for the second time in their history were Exeter City Reserves. The winners of Division Two were the returning Swindon Town Reserves. There was again no promotion or relegation between the two divisions this season.

== Division One ==
After Plymouth Argyle Reserves left the league, Division One was increased from eight to nine clubs, with two new clubs joining:

- Bath City, Reserves re-joining after leaving the league in 1930.
- Cardiff City Reserves, re-joining after leaving the league in 1921.

Pos	Team	Pld	W	D	L	GF	GA	GR	Pts	Result
1	Exeter City Reserves	16	11	2	3	59	29	2.034	24	
2	Torquay United Reserves	16	11	1	4	55	29	1.897	23	
3	Yeovil and Petters United	16	10	0	6	51	31	1.645	20	
4	Bath City Reserves	16	8	1	7	39	39	1.000	17	
5	Bristol City Reserves	16	6	4	6	54	42	1.286	16	Left at the end of the season
6	Bristol Rovers Reserves	16	7	2	7	34	34	1.000	16	
7	Lovells Athletic	16	6	3	7	36	35	1.029	15	
8	Cardiff City Reserves	16	3	1	12	31	66	0.470	7	Left at the end of the season
9	Taunton Town	16	2	2	12	13	67	0.194	6	

== Division Two ==
Division Two remained at eighteen clubs after Coleford Athletic left and one new team joined:

- Swindon Town Reserves, rejoining after leaving the league in 1927.

Pos	Team	Pld	W	D	L	GF	GA	GR	Pts
1	Swindon Town Reserves	34	28	1	5	124	51	2.431	57
2	Street	34	20	9	5	105	60	1.750	49
3	Bristol City "A"	34	18	6	10	91	64	1.422	42
4	Bath City Reserves	34	16	6	12	100	68	1.471	38
5	Bristol St George	34	17	4	13	92	86	1.070	38
6	Salisbury City	34	16	4	14	92	70	1.314	36
7	Portland United	34	15	5	14	95	72	1.319	35
8	Radstock Town	34	15	5	14	71	65	1.092	35
9	Frome Town	34	16	2	16	92	112	0.821	34
10	Weymouth	34	15	3	16	109	92	1.185	33
11	Wells City	34	11	8	15	82	83	0.988	30
12	Glastonbury	34	13	4	17	67	92	0.728	30
13	Welton Rovers	34	13	3	18	72	91	0.791	29
14	Poole Town	34	13	3	18	75	97	0.773	29
15	Trowbridge Town	34	11	5	18	66	106	0.623	27
16	Warminster Town	34	10	4	20	68	125	0.544	24
17	Chippenham Town	34	9	5	20	71	99	0.717	23
18	Paulton Rovers	34	9	5	20	50	89	0.562	23

Rules for classification: The system of using goal average to separate two teams tied on points was used up to and including the 1976–77 season. The points system: 2 points for a win, 1 point for a draw and 0 points for losing.
