= 1927–28 Western Football League =

Western Football League
- Season: 1927–28
- Champions: Plymouth Argyle Reserves (Division One); Trowbridge Town (Division Two)

The 1927–28 season was the 31st in the history of the Western Football League.

The Division One champions this season were Plymouth Argyle Reserves for the first time in their history. The winners of Division Two were Trowbridge Town.

== Division One ==
The number of clubs in Division One was reduced from twelve to eleven after Poole and Swindon Town Reserves left the league. Torquay United also left, having been promoted to The Football League.

Two new teams joined the league:

- Salisbury City, rejoining after leaving the league in 1906. This is not the same club as the later incarnation of Salisbury City F.C.
- Torquay United Reserves
- Taunton United changed their name to Taunton Town. This is not the same club as the current incarnation of Taunton Town F.C.

Pos	Team	Pld	W	D	L	GF	GA	GR	Pts	Relegation
1	Plymouth Argyle Reserves	20	13	5	2	76	32	2.375	31	
2	Exeter City Reserves	20	13	4	3	50	24	2.083	30	
3	Yeovil and Petters United	20	12	2	6	56	44	1.273	26	
4	Bristol City Reserves	20	10	4	6	71	40	1.775	24	
5	Bristol Rovers Reserves	20	11	2	7	61	39	1.564	24	
6	Taunton Town	20	9	5	6	36	33	1.091	23	
7	Lovells Athletic	20	7	2	11	40	49	0.816	16	Left at the end of the season
8	Torquay United Reserves	20	5	6	9	34	52	0.654	16	
9	Bath City Reserves	20	5	3	12	36	54	0.667	13	
10	Weymouth (R)	20	3	3	14	16	60	0.267	9	Relegated to Division Two
11	Salisbury City (R)	20	3	2	15	23	72	0.319	8	Relegated to Division Two

(R) Relegated

== Division Two ==
Division Two was reduced from ten to eight clubs after Frome Town joined the Somerset Senior League, and Lovells Athletic Reserves also left. No new teams joined Division Two.

Pos	Team	Pld	W	D	L	GF	GA	GR	Pts	Result
1	Trowbridge Town	14	12	0	2	43	16	2.688	24	
2	Yeovil and Petters United Reserves	14	10	2	2	56	21	2.667	22	
3	Portland United	14	7	1	6	35	30	1.167	15	
4	Welton Rovers	14	7	0	7	44	26	1.692	14	
5	Radstock Town	14	6	1	7	48	41	1.171	13	
6	Weymouth Reserves	14	4	1	9	22	52	0.423	9	Left at the end of the season
7	Poole Reserves	14	4	1	9	25	54	0.463	9	Left at the end of the season
8	Minehead	14	3	0	11	17	50	0.340	6	Left at the end of the season

Rules for classification: The system of using goal average to separate two teams tied on points was used up to and including the 1976–77 season. The points system: 2 points for a win, 1 point for a draw and 0 points for losing.
