= 1937–38 Western Football League =

Western Football League
- Season: 1937–38
- Champions: Bristol City Reserves (Division One); Weymouth (Division Two)

The 1937–38 season was the 41st in the history of the Western Football League.

The Division One champions for the fifth time in their history were Bristol City Reserves. The winners of Division Two for the second consecutive season were Weymouth. There was again no promotion or relegation between the two divisions this season.

== Division One ==
Division One remained at five clubs, with no clubs leaving or joining.

Pos	Team	Pld	W	D	L	GF	GA	GR	Pts
1	Bristol City Reserves	8	6	1	1	21	7	3.000	13
2	Yeovil and Petters United	8	5	1	2	20	16	1.250	11
3	Bristol Rovers Reserves	8	4	0	4	15	14	1.071	8
4	Torquay United Reserves	8	3	1	4	12	15	0.800	7
5	Lovells Athletic	8	0	1	7	9	25	0.360	1

== Division Two ==
Division Two remained at eighteen clubs after Swindon Town Reserves left and one new club joined:

- Bath City Reserves, rejoining after leaving the league in 1936.

Pos	Team	Pld	W	D	L	GF	GA	GR	Pts
1	Weymouth	34	27	4	3	121	34	3.559	58
2	Street	34	21	4	9	113	53	2.132	46
3	Portland United	34	17	6	11	109	57	1.912	40
4	Yeovil and Petters United Reserves	34	15	10	9	99	61	1.623	40
5	Salisbury City	34	18	4	12	94	76	1.237	40
6	Chippenham Town	34	18	4	12	91	90	1.011	40
7	Radstock Town	34	18	4	12	79	80	0.988	40
8	Trowbridge Town	34	16	7	11	102	76	1.342	39
9	Glastonbury	34	18	2	14	85	67	1.269	38
10	Poole Town	34	14	7	13	79	67	1.179	35
11	Wells City	34	13	8	13	75	87	0.862	34
12	Bristol City "A"	34	15	1	18	86	100	0.860	31
13	Warminster Town	34	10	9	15	66	92	0.717	29
14	Frome Town	34	9	7	18	66	94	0.702	25
15	Bristol Rovers "A"	34	9	6	19	63	89	0.708	24
16	Paulton Rovers	34	9	6	19	61	124	0.492	24
17	Welton Rovers	34	5	7	22	52	142	0.366	17
18	Bath City Reserves	34	3	6	25	51	103	0.495	12

Rules for classification: The system of using goal average to separate two teams tied on points was used up to and including the 1976–77 season. The points system: 2 points for a win, 1 point for a draw and 0 points for losing.
