= 1925–26 Western Football League =

Western Football League
- Season: 1925–26
- Champions: Bristol City Reserves (Division One); Poole (Division Two)

The 1925–26 season was the 29th in the history of the Western Football League.

From this season, the league consisted of two divisions after a number of reserve teams joined. The Division One champions were Bristol City Reserves. The winners of Division Two were Poole, who were promoted to Division One.

== Division One ==
Division One consisted of three clubs from the old single-division league, plus two new clubs and five new reserve teams. The number of clubs was thus reduced from thirteen to ten after Peasedown St John left the league.

The seven new teams were:

- Bristol City Reserves, rejoining after leaving the league in 1921.
- Bristol Rovers Reserves, rejoining after leaving the league in 1921.
- Exeter City Reserves, rejoining after leaving the league in 1921.
- Plymouth Argyle Reserves
- Swindon Town Reserves, rejoining after leaving the league in 1921.
- Taunton United
- Torquay United, rejoining after leaving the league in 1922.

| Pos | Team | Pld | W | D | L | GF | GA | GR | Pts |
|---|---|---|---|---|---|---|---|---|---|
| 1 | Bristol City Reserves | 18 | 10 | 7 | 1 | 58 | 19 | 3.053 | 27 |
| 2 | Bristol Rovers Reserves | 18 | 11 | 2 | 5 | 53 | 36 | 1.472 | 24 |
| 3 | Torquay United | 18 | 9 | 4 | 5 | 28 | 22 | 1.273 | 22 |
| 4 | Yeovil and Petters United | 18 | 7 | 7 | 4 | 33 | 27 | 1.222 | 21 |
| 5 | Swindon Town Reserves | 18 | 6 | 8 | 4 | 32 | 33 | 0.970 | 20 |
| 6 | Weymouth | 18 | 7 | 4 | 7 | 37 | 45 | 0.822 | 18 |
| 7 | Plymouth Argyle Reserves | 18 | 6 | 5 | 7 | 31 | 25 | 1.240 | 17 |
| 8 | Exeter City Reserves | 18 | 6 | 4 | 8 | 33 | 41 | 0.805 | 16 |
| 9 | Taunton United | 18 | 3 | 3 | 12 | 18 | 45 | 0.400 | 9 |
| 10 | Bath City Reserves | 18 | 1 | 4 | 13 | 20 | 50 | 0.400 | 6 |

== Division Two ==
The new Division Two consisted of the other nine clubs from the old single-division league, and four new teams, three of them reserve teams of Division One clubs.

- Bath City Reserves
- Portland United
- Weymouth Reserves
- Yeovil and Petters United Reserves

| Pos | Team | Pld | W | D | L | GF | GA | GR | Pts | Promotion |
|---|---|---|---|---|---|---|---|---|---|---|
| 1 | Poole (P) | 24 | 17 | 3 | 4 | 76 | 30 | 2.533 | 37 | Promoted to Division One |
| 2 | Welton Rovers | 24 | 16 | 4 | 4 | 62 | 37 | 1.676 | 36 | |
| 3 | Weymouth Reserves | 24 | 12 | 4 | 8 | 69 | 47 | 1.468 | 28 | |
| 4 | Lovells Athletic (P) | 24 | 8 | 8 | 8 | 52 | 46 | 1.130 | 24 | Promoted to Division One |
| 5 | Radstock Town | 24 | 9 | 6 | 9 | 31 | 28 | 1.107 | 24 | |
| 6 | Minehead | 24 | 10 | 4 | 10 | 42 | 53 | 0.792 | 24 | |
| 7 | Portland United | 24 | 8 | 7 | 9 | 49 | 56 | 0.875 | 23 | |
| 8 | Trowbridge Town | 24 | 8 | 6 | 10 | 56 | 68 | 0.824 | 22 | |
| 9 | Swindon Victoria | 24 | 9 | 3 | 12 | 55 | 71 | 0.775 | 21 | Left at the end of the season |
| 10 | Paulton Rovers | 24 | 7 | 6 | 11 | 48 | 68 | 0.706 | 20 | Left at the end of the season |
| 11 | Bath City Reserves | 24 | 7 | 5 | 12 | 50 | 53 | 0.943 | 19 | Left at the end of the season |
| 12 | Yeovil and Petters United Reserves | 24 | 7 | 4 | 13 | 48 | 57 | 0.842 | 18 | |
| 13 | Frome Town | 24 | 5 | 6 | 13 | 40 | 64 | 0.625 | 16 | |

Rules for classification: The system of using goal average to separate two teams tied on points was used up to and including the 1976–77 season. The points system: 2 points for a win, 1 point for a draw and 0 points for losing.
(P) Promoted
