= 1921–22 Western Football League =

Western Football League
- Season: 1921–22
- Champions: Yeovil and Petters United (Division One); Clandown (Division Two)

The 1921–22 Western Football League season was the 25th in the history of the Western Football League.

The Division One champions this season were Yeovil and Petters United, for the first time in their history. Champions of Division Two were Clandown, who left the league at the end of the season, as the previous season's trend of many clubs leaving the Western League continued.

== Division One ==
Five new clubs joined Division One this season, although the number of clubs was reduced from sixteen to eight after Abertillery Town, Barry Reserves, Bath City, Bristol City Reserves, Bristol Rovers Reserves, Cardiff City Reserves, Douglas, Exeter City Reserves, Mid Rhondda, Pontypridd, Swansea Town Reserves, Swindon Town Reserves and Ton Pentre left the league.

- Horfield United, rejoining after leaving the league in 1920
- Peasedown St John, promoted from Division Two
- Torquay United, joining from the Plymouth & District League
- Trowbridge Town, promoted from Division Two
- Weymouth, rejoining after leaving the league in 1914

Pos	Team	Pld	W	D	L	GF	GA	GR	Pts	Result
1	Yeovil and Petters United	14	10	2	2	26	9	2.889	22	
2	Trowbridge Town	14	8	1	5	18	15	1.200	17	
3	Welton Rovers	14	7	2	5	31	27	1.148	16	
4	Cardiff Corinthians	14	7	1	6	30	22	1.364	15	
5	Torquay United	14	6	2	6	25	17	1.471	14	Moved to the Southern League English Section
6	Peasedown St John	14	5	3	6	21	19	1.105	13	
7	Weymouth	14	5	1	8	15	25	0.600	11	
8	Horfield United	14	1	2	11	10	42	0.238	4	Left at the end of the season

== Division Two ==
One new club joined Division Two this season, although the number of clubs was reduced from ten to nine after Peasedown St John and Trowbridge Town were promoted.

- Coleford Athletic

Pos	Team	Pld	W	D	L	GF	GA	GR	Pts	Result
1	Clandown	16	10	5	1	22	5	4.400	25	Left at the end of the season
2	Coleford Athletic	16	11	1	4	35	19	1.842	23	Left at the end of the season
3	Radstock Town	16	7	4	5	23	14	1.643	18	
4	Timsbury Athletic	16	7	2	7	23	22	1.045	16	Left at the end of the season
5	Welton Amateurs	16	8	0	8	22	22	1.000	16	Left at the end of the season
6	Glastonbury	16	6	2	8	21	36	0.583	14	Left at the end of the season
7	Paulton Rovers	16	4	5	7	26	22	1.182	13	Left at the end of the season
8	Frome Town	16	5	2	9	21	29	0.724	12	Left at the end of the season
9	Street	16	2	3	11	25	49	0.510	7	Left at the end of the season

Rules for classification: The system of using goal average to separate two teams tied on points was used up to and including the 1976–77 season. The points system: 2 points for a win, 1 point for a draw and 0 points for losing.
