= 1924–25 Western Football League =

Western Football League
- Season: 1924–25
- Champions: Yeovil and Petters United

The 1924–25 season was the 28th in the history of the Western Football League.

This season was the last until the dawn of World War II in which the league consisted of a single division. The champions this season were Yeovil and Petters United. The previous season's runaway winners Lovells Athletic finished bottom of the table.

== Final table ==
Three new clubs joined the league this season, and the number of clubs increased from eleven to thirteen after Cardiff Corinthians left the league.

- Frome Town, rejoining after leaving the league in 1922.
- Swindon Victoria
- Welton Rovers, rejoining after leaving the league in 1923.

Pos	Team	Pld	W	D	L	GF	GA	GR	Pts	Result
1	Yeovil and Petters United	24	19	3	2	65	20	3.250	41	
2	Weymouth	24	18	3	3	74	17	4.353	39	
3	Swindon Victoria	24	14	3	7	51	48	1.063	31	
4	Welton Rovers	24	9	10	5	50	28	1.786	28	
5	Poole	24	11	6	7	50	38	1.316	28	
6	Radstock Town	24	9	9	6	35	31	1.129	27	
7	Frome Town	24	10	6	8	50	44	1.136	26	
8	Trowbridge Town	24	9	6	9	46	37	1.243	24	
9	Paulton Rovers	24	6	7	11	39	54	0.722	19	
10	Minehead	24	7	1	16	47	74	0.635	15	
11	Bath City Reserves	24	4	5	15	26	58	0.448	13	
12	Peasedown St John	24	4	5	15	19	65	0.292	13	Left at the end of the season
13	Lovells Athletic	24	1	6	17	25	63	0.397	8	

Rules for classification: The system of using goal average to separate two teams tied on points was used up to and including the 1976–77 season. The points system: 2 points for a win, 1 point for a draw and 0 points for losing.
