= 1930–31 Western Football League =

Western Football League
- Season: 1930–31
- Champions: Exeter City Reserves (Division One); Portland United (Division Two)

The 1930–31 season was the 34th in the history of the Western Football League.

The Division One champions for the first time in their history were Exeter City Reserves. The winners of Division Two were Portland United. There was again no promotion or relegation between the two divisions this season.

== Division One ==
Division One was reduced from eight to seven clubs after Bath City left the league.

| Pos | Team | Pld | W | D | L | GF | GA | GR | Pts |
|---|---|---|---|---|---|---|---|---|---|
| 1 | Exeter City Reserves | 12 | 9 | 1 | 2 | 34 | 24 | 1.417 | 19 |
| 2 | Yeovil and Petters United | 12 | 7 | 2 | 3 | 43 | 27 | 1.593 | 16 |
| 3 | Bristol Rovers Reserves | 12 | 6 | 3 | 3 | 28 | 19 | 1.474 | 15 |
| 4 | Bristol City Reserves | 12 | 4 | 2 | 6 | 34 | 28 | 1.214 | 10 |
| 5 | Taunton Town | 12 | 5 | 0 | 7 | 20 | 34 | 0.588 | 10 |
| 6 | Plymouth Argyle Reserves | 12 | 3 | 1 | 8 | 23 | 33 | 0.697 | 7 |
| 7 | Torquay United Reserves | 12 | 1 | 5 | 6 | 18 | 35 | 0.514 | 7 |

== Division Two ==
Division Two was increased from ten to seventeen clubs after seven new clubs joined:

- Chippenham Town, rejoining after leaving the league in 1906.
- Coleford Athletic, rejoining after leaving the league in 1922.
- Petters Westland
- Poole Town, rejoining after leaving the league in 1927.
- Salisbury City, rejoining after leaving the league in 1929.
- Street, rejoining after leaving the league in 1922.
- Warminster Town

| Pos | Team | Pld | W | D | L | GF | GA | GR | Pts | Result |
|---|---|---|---|---|---|---|---|---|---|---|
| 1 | Portland United | 32 | 24 | 3 | 5 | 111 | 47 | 2.362 | 51 | |
| 2 | Salisbury City | 32 | 22 | 4 | 6 | 93 | 50 | 1.860 | 48 | |
| 3 | Welton Rovers | 32 | 20 | 6 | 6 | 106 | 64 | 1.656 | 46 | |
| 4 | Wells City | 32 | 21 | 2 | 9 | 92 | 61 | 1.508 | 44 | |
| 5 | Bristol City "A" | 32 | 19 | 5 | 8 | 111 | 72 | 1.542 | 43 | |
| 6 | Bath City Reserves | 32 | 18 | 3 | 11 | 102 | 56 | 1.821 | 39 | |
| 7 | Warminster Town | 32 | 15 | 5 | 12 | 94 | 77 | 1.221 | 35 | |
| 8 | Radstock Town | 32 | 15 | 5 | 12 | 63 | 85 | 0.741 | 35 | |
| 9 | Poole Town | 32 | 14 | 4 | 14 | 76 | 72 | 1.056 | 32 | |
| 10 | Chippenham Town | 32 | 10 | 8 | 14 | 82 | 68 | 1.206 | 28 | |
| 11 | Trowbridge Town | 32 | 9 | 9 | 14 | 58 | 60 | 0.967 | 27 | |
| 12 | Paulton Rovers | 32 | 8 | 10 | 14 | 45 | 67 | 0.672 | 26 | |
| 13 | Petters Westland | 32 | 10 | 2 | 20 | 76 | 101 | 0.752 | 22 | Left at the end of the season |
| 14 | Bristol St George | 32 | 10 | 1 | 21 | 80 | 135 | 0.593 | 21 | |
| 15 | Weymouth | 32 | 9 | 1 | 22 | 81 | 128 | 0.633 | 19 | |
| 16 | Street | 32 | 6 | 4 | 22 | 52 | 96 | 0.542 | 16 | |
| 17 | Coleford Athletic | 32 | 6 | 0 | 26 | 60 | 143 | 0.420 | 12 | |

Rules for classification: The system of using goal average to separate two teams tied on points was used up to and including the 1976–77 season. The points system: 2 points for a win, 1 point for a draw and 0 points for losing.
