= 1926–27 Western Football League =

Western Football League
- Season: 1926–27
- Champions: Bristol City Reserves (Division One); Poole Reserves (Division Two)

The 1926–27 season was the 30th in the history of the Western Football League.

The Division One champions this season were again Bristol City Reserves. The winners of Division Two were Poole Reserves. There was no promotion or relegation between the two divisions.

== Division One ==
The number of clubs in Division One was increased from ten to twelve:

- Lovells Athletic, promoted from Division Two.
- Poole, promoted as champions of Division Two.

Pos	Team	Pld	W	D	L	GF	GA	GR	Pts	Result
1	Bristol City Reserves	22	16	2	4	59	32	1.844	34	
2	Torquay United	22	14	4	4	47	27	1.741	32	Elected to Football League Third Division South
3	Plymouth Argyle Reserves	22	13	1	8	63	37	1.703	27	
4	Lovells Athletic	22	11	5	6	47	36	1.306	27	
5	Bristol Rovers Reserves	22	12	3	7	49	41	1.195	27	
6	Exeter City Reserves	22	10	3	9	61	53	1.151	23	
7	Yeovil and Petters United	22	10	1	11	48	44	1.091	21	
8	Swindon Town Reserves	22	9	2	11	41	47	0.872	20	Left at the end of the season
9	Bath City Reserves	22	8	3	11	35	50	0.700	19	
10	Poole	22	6	2	14	40	69	0.580	14	Left at the end of the season
11	Taunton United	22	4	3	15	28	55	0.509	11	
12	Weymouth	22	3	3	16	30	57	0.526	9	

== Division Two ==
Division Two was reduced from thirteen to ten clubs after Poole and Lovells Athletic were promoted to Division One, and Bath City Reserves, Paulton Rovers and Swindon Victoria all left the league. Two new teams joined the league:

- Lovells Athletic Reserves
- Poole Reserves

Pos	Team	Pld	W	D	L	GF	GA	GR	Pts	Result
1	Poole Reserves	18	14	2	2	68	19	3.579	30	
2	Radstock Town	18	12	1	5	43	29	1.483	25	
3	Portland United	18	12	0	6	62	31	2.000	24	
4	Welton Rovers	18	9	2	7	61	39	1.564	20	
5	Yeovil and Petters United Reserves	18	8	3	7	44	40	1.100	19	
6	Lovells Athletic Reserves	18	8	0	10	48	48	1.000	16	Left at the end of the season
7	Trowbridge Town	18	5	2	11	44	52	0.846	12	
8	Frome Town	18	5	2	11	28	62	0.452	12	Left at the end of the season
9	Weymouth Reserves	18	4	4	10	25	60	0.417	12	
10	Minehead	18	5	0	13	24	67	0.358	10	

Rules for classification: The system of using goal average to separate two teams tied on points was used up to and including the 1976–77 season. The points system: 2 points for a win, 1 point for a draw and 0 points for losing.
