= 1969–70 Western Football League =

Western Football League
- Season: 1969–70
- Champions: Glastonbury

The 1969–70 season was the 68th in the history of the Western Football League.

The champions for the third time in their history were Glastonbury.

== League table ==
The league was increased from 19 to 20 clubs after no clubs left and one new club joined:

- Weymouth Reserves, rejoining the league after leaving in 1967.

Pos	Team	Pld	W	D	L	GF	GA	GR	Pts	Qualification
1	Glastonbury	38	29	5	4	100	37	2.703	63	
2	Andover	38	26	6	6	76	20	3.800	58	
3	Bridgwater Town	38	23	7	8	97	41	2.366	53	
4	Minehead	38	21	10	7	70	37	1.892	52	
5	Taunton Town	38	21	8	9	84	56	1.500	50	
6	Bideford	38	20	7	11	84	58	1.448	47	
7	Dorchester Town	38	18	8	12	78	69	1.130	44	
8	Torquay United Reserves	38	15	10	13	70	54	1.296	40	
9	Bath City Reserves	38	16	7	15	71	67	1.060	39	
10	Welton Rovers	38	17	3	18	72	62	1.161	37	
11	Weston-super-Mare	38	14	8	16	53	72	0.736	36	
12	Frome Town	38	12	10	16	62	73	0.849	34	
13	Portland United	38	14	6	18	63	94	0.670	34	Left at the end of the season
14	Bristol City Colts	38	13	7	18	58	76	0.763	33	
15	Devizes Town	38	10	9	19	44	70	0.629	29	
16	Barnstaple Town	38	11	6	21	58	73	0.795	28	
17	Yeovil Town Reserves	38	9	6	23	38	78	0.487	24	Left at the end of the season
18	Weymouth Reserves	38	10	4	24	34	74	0.459	24	Left at the end of the season
19	Bridport	38	6	9	23	43	86	0.500	21	
20	St Luke's College	38	4	6	28	35	93	0.376	14	

Rules for classification: The system of using goal average to separate two teams tied on points was used up to and including the 1976–77 season. The points system: 2 points for a win, 1 point for a draw and 0 points for losing.
