= 1913–14 Western Football League =

Western Football League
- Season: 1913–14
- Champions: Cardiff City Reserves

The 1913–14 season was the 22nd in the history of the Western Football League.

The league champions this season were Cardiff City Reserves, the first time they had won the league. This was the last season before the outbreak of World War I, which halted all organised football in the United Kingdom for several years. The Western League did not recommence until the 1919–20 season, when a number of new clubs joined the league and a second division was formed. Several clubs did not rejoin the league after the war.

== Final table ==
One new club joined the league, although the number of clubs remained at 12 after Barry District left to join the Southern League.

- Trowbridge Town, rejoining the league after leaving in 1907.

Pos	Team	Pld	W	D	L	GF	GA	GR	Pts	Result
1	Cardiff City Reserves	22	18	3	1	88	10	8.800	39	Did not rejoin after the war
2	Bath City	22	17	2	3	67	34	1.971	36	
3	Bristol Rovers Reserves	22	16	3	3	72	18	4.000	35	
4	Weymouth	22	13	2	7	51	35	1.457	28	Did not rejoin after the war
5	Peasedown St John	22	12	4	6	33	35	0.943	28	
6	Welton Rovers	22	12	2	8	55	33	1.667	26	
7	Street	22	7	6	9	37	48	0.771	20	
8	Trowbridge Town	22	7	2	13	33	43	0.767	16	
9	Camerton	22	5	2	15	33	72	0.458	12	Did not rejoin after the war
10	Paulton Rovers	22	4	2	16	24	73	0.329	10	
11	Clevedon	22	3	3	16	19	60	0.317	9	Did not rejoin after the war
12	Weston-super-Mare	22	2	1	19	21	72	0.292	5	Did not rejoin after the war

Rules for classification: The system of using goal average to separate two teams tied on points was used up to and including the 1976–77 season. The points system: 2 points for a win, 1 point for a draw and 0 points for losing.
