= 1910–11 Western Football League =

Western Football League
- Season: 1910–11
- Champions: Bristol City Reserves

The 1910–11 season was the 19th in the history of the Western Football League.

The league champions this season were the unbeaten Bristol City Reserves, the first time that the league had been won by a reserve team, although both Bristol City Reserves and Bristol Rovers Reserves had won the old Division Two title on a number of occasions.

== Final table ==
Three new clubs joined the league, but the number of clubs was reduced from 13 to 10 clubs, after Aberdare Town, Kingswood Rovers, Merthyr Town, Radstock Town, Ton Pentre and Treharris all left the league.

- Camerton
- Clevedon, rejoining the league after leaving in 1895.
- Weston-super-Mare, rejoining the league after leaving in 1902.

Pos	Team	Pld	W	D	L	GF	GA	GR	Pts	Result
1	Bristol City Reserves	18	15	3	0	58	14	4.143	33	Left the league at the end of the season
2	Bristol Rovers Reserves	18	9	6	3	45	26	1.731	24	
3	Bath City	18	9	4	5	38	30	1.267	22	
4	Barry District	18	8	4	6	49	37	1.324	20	
5	Welton Rovers	18	7	3	8	34	35	0.971	17	
6	Weymouth	18	7	1	10	42	45	0.933	15	
7	Weston-super-Mare	18	5	5	8	32	36	0.889	15	
8	Camerton	18	3	7	8	31	42	0.738	13	
9	Clevedon	18	4	3	11	22	54	0.407	11	
10	Paulton Rovers	18	4	2	12	20	52	0.385	10	

Rules for classification: The system of using goal average to separate two teams tied on points was used up to and including the 1976–77 season. The points system: 2 points for a win, 1 point for a draw and 0 points for losing.
