= 1923–24 Western Football League =

Western Football League
- Season: 1923–24
- Champions: Lovells Athletic

The 1923–24 season was the 27th in the history of the Western Football League.

After a period of two to three years in which many clubs left the league, this season marked the start of a period of growth. The champions this season were newcomers Lovells Athletic.

== Final table ==
Four new clubs joined the league this season, and the number of clubs increased from nine to eleven after Hanham Athletic and Welton Rovers left the league.

- Lovells Athletic
- Minehead
- Paulton Rovers, rejoining after leaving in 1922
- Poole

Pos	Team	Pld	W	D	L	GF	GA	GR	Pts	Result
1	Lovells Athletic	20	16	3	1	43	10	4.300	35	
2	Radstock Town	20	13	3	4	43	12	3.583	29	
3	Weymouth	20	10	5	5	38	24	1.583	25	
4	Cardiff Corinthians	20	11	3	6	32	26	1.231	25	Left at the end of the season
5	Poole	20	8	6	6	37	35	1.057	22	
6	Yeovil and Petters United	20	9	2	9	35	42	0.833	20	
7	Trowbridge Town	20	6	2	12	29	42	0.690	14	
8	Peasedown St John	20	6	2	12	23	42	0.548	14	
9	Minehead	20	5	3	12	32	44	0.727	13	
10	Bath City II	20	5	2	13	21	38	0.553	12	
11	Paulton Rovers	20	3	5	12	20	38	0.526	11	

Rules for classification: The system of using goal average to separate two teams tied on points was used up to and including the 1976–77 season. The points system: 2 points for a win, 1 point for a draw and 0 points for losing.
