= 1905–06 Western Football League =

Western Football League
- Season: 1905–06
- Champions: Queens Park Rangers (Division One); Bristol Rovers Reserves (Division Two)

The 1905–06 season was the 14th in the history of the Western Football League.

Queens Park Rangers were the champions of Division One for the first time, after finishing bottom of the league the previous season. Along with all the other members of Division One, they also competed in the Southern League during this season. The Division Two champions for the second season in succession were Bristol Rovers Reserves.

== Division One ==
No new clubs joined Division One, which remained at 11 clubs.

Pos	Team	Pld	W	D	L	GF	GA	GR	Pts
1	Queens Park Rangers	20	11	4	5	33	27	1.222	26
2	Southampton	20	10	5	5	41	35	1.171	25
3	Plymouth Argyle	20	8	8	4	34	23	1.478	24
4	Tottenham Hotspur	20	7	7	6	28	17	1.647	21
5	Bristol Rovers	20	8	3	9	34	34	1.000	19
6	Millwall	20	7	5	8	28	29	0.966	19
7	Portsmouth	20	6	7	7	26	29	0.897	19
8	West Ham United	20	7	5	8	32	35	0.914	19
9	Reading	20	6	6	8	28	35	0.800	18
10	Fulham	20	5	5	10	23	32	0.719	15
11	Brentford	20	6	3	11	25	36	0.694	15

== Division Two ==
Two new clubs joined Division Two, which remained at 10 clubs after Swindon Town Reserves left the league and Warmley disbanded.

- Paulton Rovers, rejoining from the Somerset Senior League
- Salisbury City, joining from the Hampshire League. This is not the same club as the later incarnation of Salisbury City F.C.

Pos	Team	Pld	W	D	L	GF	GA	GR	Pts	Result
1	Bristol Rovers Reserves	18	16	1	1	90	19	4.737	33	
2	Bristol City Reserves	18	14	2	2	78	13	6.000	30	
3	Welton Rovers	18	10	1	7	40	45	0.889	21	
4	Radstock Town	18	8	2	8	37	31	1.194	18	
5	Salisbury City	18	8	2	8	29	34	0.853	18	Left to join the Southern League Division Two
6	Staple Hill	18	8	1	9	32	38	0.842	17	
7	Paulton Rovers	18	7	2	9	26	41	0.634	16	
8	Chippenham Town	18	5	2	11	23	47	0.489	12	Left at the end of the season
9	Bristol East	17	3	1	13	14	41	0.341	7 (Note: Bristol East did not travel to Trowbridge Town to play on 17 March 1906.)	Left at the end of the season
10	Trowbridge Town	17	2	2	13	13	73	0.178	6	

Rules for classification: The system of using goal average to separate two teams tied on points was used up to and including the 1976–77 season. The points system: 2 points for a win, 1 point for a draw and 0 points for losing.
