= 1912–13 Western Football League =

Western Football League
- Season: 1912–13
- Champions: Bristol Rovers Reserves

The 1912–13 season was the 21st in the history of the Western Football League.

The league champions this season were Bristol Rovers Reserves.

== Final table ==
One new club joined the league, and the number of clubs increased from 11 to 12 clubs.

- Cardiff City Reserves

Pos	Team	Pld	W	D	L	GF	GA	GR	Pts	Result
1	Bristol Rovers Reserves	22	17	3	2	85	23	3.696	37 (Note: The tables as published at the time contained errors, hence the totals do not balance in some columns.)	
2	Cardiff City Reserves	22	17	1	4	72	24	3.000	35	
3	Welton Rovers	22	14	5	3	56	16	3.500	33	
4	Bath City	22	13	1	8	52	35	1.486	27	
5	Barry District	22	10	4	8	48	40	1.200	24	Joined to Southern League Division Two and renamed Barry
6	Peasedown St John	22	9	3	10	33	35	0.943	21	
7	Street	22	10	1	11	44	58	0.759	21	
8	Weymouth	22	6	4	12	38	55	0.691	16	
9	Weston-super-Mare	22	6	3	13	37	55	0.673	15	
10	Camerton	22	6	3	13	27	48	0.563	15	
11	Paulton Rovers	22	4	2	16	29	79	0.367	10	
12	Clevedon	22	2	6	14	15	68	0.221	10	

Rules for classification: The system of using goal average to separate two teams tied on points was used up to and including the 1976–77 season. The points system: 2 points for a win, 1 point for a draw and 0 points for losing.
