= 1928–29 Western Football League =

Western Football League
- Season: 1928–29
- Champions: Bristol Rovers Reserves (Division One); Bath City Reserves (Division Two)

The 1928–29 season was the 32nd in the history of the Western Football League.

The Division One champions this season were Bristol Rovers Reserves. The winners of Division Two were the returning Bath City Reserves. There was no promotion or relegation between the two divisions this season.

== Division One ==
The number of clubs in Division One was reduced from eleven to eight after Salisbury City and Weymouth were relegated to Division Two. Lovells Athletic also left, joining the Southern League. No new teams joined the league.

Pos	Team	Pld	W	D	L	GF	GA	GR	Pts
1	Bristol Rovers Reserves	14	10	0	4	39	21	1.857	20
2	Plymouth Argyle Reserves	14	6	4	4	31	19	1.632	16
3	Bath City Reserves	14	6	4	4	33	30	1.100	16
4	Taunton Town	14	7	2	5	32	30	1.067	16
5	Bristol City Reserves	14	7	1	6	34	31	1.097	15
6	Exeter City Reserves	14	4	4	6	36	42	0.857	12
7	Torquay United Reserves	14	3	3	8	21	30	0.700	9
8	Yeovil and Petters United	14	2	4	8	19	42	0.452	8

== Division Two ==
Weymouth Reserves, Poole Reserves and Minehead all left the league, but Division Two was increased from eight to nine clubs after two clubs were relegated from Division One and two new clubs joined.

- Bristol St George, rejoining the league after leaving in 1903.
- Bath City Reserves, rejoining the league after leaving in 1926.
- Salisbury City, relegated from Division One.
- Weymouth, relegated from Division One.

Pos	Team	Pld	W	D	L	GF	GA	GR	Pts	Result
1	Bath City Reserves	16	12	0	4	44	28	1.571	24	
2	Portland United	16	10	3	3	44	26	1.692	23	
3	Trowbridge Town	16	8	3	5	31	33	0.939	19	
4	Yeovil and Petters United Reserves	16	8	1	7	51	33	1.545	17	Left at the end of the season
5	Welton Rovers	16	5	5	6	30	32	0.938	15	
6	Weymouth	16	4	6	6	35	41	0.854	14	
7	Salisbury City	16	5	3	8	28	36	0.778	13	Left at the end of the season
8	Bristol St George	16	4	3	9	41	56	0.732	11	
9	Radstock Town	16	3	2	11	27	46	0.587	8	

Rules for classification: The system of using goal average to separate two teams tied on points was used up to and including the 1976–77 season. The points system: 2 points for a win, 1 point for a draw and 0 points for losing.
