= 1911–12 Western Football League =

Western Football League
- Season: 1911–12
- Champions: Welton Rovers

The 1911–12 season was the 20th in the history of the Western Football League.

The league champions this season were Welton Rovers, the first time that the club had won the league.

== Final table ==
Two new clubs joined the league, and the number of clubs increased from 10 to 11 clubs, after Bristol City Reserves left the league.

- Peasedown St John
- Street

Pos	Team	Pld	W	D	L	GF	GA	GR	Pts
1	Welton Rovers	20	15	2	3	52	19	2.737	32 (Note: The tables as published at the time contained errors, hence the totals do not balance in some columns.)
2	Barry District	20	13	2	5	56	28	2.000	28
3	Weymouth	20	12	3	5	58	29	2.000	27
4	Bristol Rovers Reserves	20	12	1	7	53	39	1.359	25
5	Bath City	20	10	2	8	31	27	1.148	22
6	Camerton	20	8	1	11	30	35	0.857	17
7	Weston-super-Mare	20	7	3	10	24	30	0.800	17
8	Street	20	7	1	12	32	42	0.762	15
9	Peasedown St John	20	6	2	12	22	37	0.595	14
10	Paulton Rovers	20	5	2	13	28	70	0.400	12
11	Clevedon	20	5	1	14	21	46	0.457	11

Rules for classification: The system of using goal average to separate two teams tied on points was used up to and including the 1976–77 season. The points system: 2 points for a win, 1 point for a draw and 0 points for losing.
