= 1972–73 Western Football League =

Western Football League
- Season: 1972–73
- Champions: Devizes Town

The 1972–73 season was the 71st in the history of the Western Football League.

The champions for the first time in their history were Devizes Town.

== League table ==
The league was increased from fourteen clubs to sixteen after Bideford, Dorchester Town and Minehead joined the Southern League, and five new clubs joined:

- Ashtonians United
- Avon Bradford
- Bristol City Colts, rejoining the league after leaving in 1971.
- Exeter City Reserves, rejoining the league after leaving in 1968.
- Mangotsfield United (not the original Mangotsfield club which was a league member during the 1890s)

Pos	Team	Pld	W	D	L	GF	GA	GR	Pts	Qualification
1	Devizes Town	30	21	5	4	68	27	2.519	47	
2	Taunton Town	30	19	7	4	69	26	2.654	45	
3	Mangotsfield United	30	21	3	6	69	35	1.971	45	
4	Bridgwater Town	30	17	7	6	65	24	2.708	41	
5	Weston-super-Mare	30	13	9	8	42	36	1.167	35	
6	Glastonbury	30	14	6	10	45	44	1.023	34	
7	Barnstaple Town	30	13	7	10	57	52	1.096	33	
8	Bridport	30	10	10	10	40	30	1.333	30	
9	Torquay United Reserves	30	11	6	13	53	47	1.128	28	Left at the end of the season
10	Frome Town	30	9	9	12	30	44	0.682	27	
11	Welton Rovers	30	9	8	13	35	41	0.854	26	
12	Exeter City Reserves	30	7	11	12	39	47	0.830	25	
13	St Luke's College	30	9	3	18	33	73	0.452	21	
14	Avon Bradford	30	6	3	21	27	68	0.397	15	
15	Bristol City Colts	30	5	4	21	35	76	0.461	14	Left at the end of the season
16	Ashtonians United	30	4	6	20	26	63	0.413	14	

Rules for classification: The system of using goal average to separate two teams tied on points was used up to and including the 1976–77 season. The points system: 2 points for a win, 1 point for a draw and 0 points for losing.
