= Salisbury City F.C. (1905) =

Defunct association football club in England

Salisbury City
- Full name: Salisbury City Football Club
- Nickname: City
- Founded: 1895
- Dissolved: 1947
- Ground: Stratford Road
Home colours

Salisbury City F.C. was an English football club based in Salisbury, Wiltshire, unrelated to the later Salisbury City F.C. and the current Salisbury F.C.

== History ==
Salisbury City were formed in 1895. They joined the Western Football League in 1905–06, having previously played in the Hampshire League since 1902. The following season the club turned professional, moving into the Southern League, where they stayed until 1911. Having been suspended by the FA following a wages dispute, the club reverted to amateur status and returned to the Hampshire League.

Salisbury City resurfaced in the Western League in 1927, left again in 1929, and rejoined in 1930. They remained in Division Two of the Western League throughout the 1930s, finishing as runners-up three times, and left the league for the final time in 1939. City were also regular entrants in the FA Cup, reaching the Fourth Qualifying Round twice in 1928–29 and 1931–32.

With the advent of World War II, the club was forced to cease operations, and it was unable to pay its rent. In August 1940, three boys, playing with matches in the empty stand, lit a small bonfire and left, mistakenly thinking they had extinguished the fire. However, helped by long grass which had grown around the stand while the ground was empty, the stand was completely gutted. The consequence was that the club did not re-start operations after the war, and entered voluntary liquidation in 1947.

== League history ==
Salisbury City's seasons of Western and Southern League football are listed below.

Season	Division	Position	W	D	L	F	A	Pts
1905–06	Western League, Division Two	5 of 10	8	2	8	29	34	18
1906–07	Southern League, Division Two	7 of 12	9	2	11	40	42	20
1907–08	Southern League, Division Two	7 of 10	6	4	8	35	46	16
1908–09	Southern League, Division Two	6 of 7	3	1	8	24	36	7
1909–10	Southern League, Division Two A	4 of 6	2	1	5	7	18	5
1910–11	Southern League, Division Two	12 of 12	0	3	19	16	92	3
1927–28	Western League, Division One	11 of 11	3	2	15	23	72	8
1928–29	Western League, Division Two	7 of 9	5	3	8	28	36	13
1930–31	Western League, Division Two	2 of 17	22	4	6	93	50	48
1931–32	Western League, Division Two	2 of 18	23	5	6	122	50	51
1932–33	Western League, Division Two	6 of 18	16	4	14	92	70	36
1933–34	Western League, Division Two	4 of 18	18	7	9	71	37	43
1934–35	Western League, Division Two	2 of 18	21	6	7	86	41	48
1935–36	Western League, Division Two	11 of 18	13	8	13	60	65	34
1936–37	Western League, Division Two	3 of 18	20	9	5	97	45	49
1937–38	Western League, Division Two	5 of 18	18	4	12	94	76	40
1938–39	Western League, Division Two	17 of 18	8	3	23	50	93	19

== Colours ==
The club wore black and white striped shirts and blue knickers.

== Ground ==
The club originally played at Victoria Park, which was owned by the city council, and which required advance permission for use. In 1933 the club agreed to buy the Free Churches Sports Ground in Britford Lane, at a cost of £1,300. However the plans failed to materialise and the club instead rented a ground for 24 years (at £20 per annum) off the Stratford Road.

== Local rivalries ==
Salisbury City had a number of local rivals, most notably Salisbury Corinthians who played in the Hampshire League from 1924 until their demise in 1949. The two clubs frequently met each other in the FA Cup with the games generating much local interest.

== Successor clubs ==
- See Salisbury City and Salisbury.

== Links ==
- Football Club History Database
