= Paul Milsom =

English footballer & manager (born 1974)

Personal information
- Full name: Paul Jason Milsom
- Date of birth: 5 October 1974 (age 52)
- Place of birth: Bristol, England
- Height: 6 ft 1 in (1.85 m)
- Positions: Forward; defender

Senior career*
Years	Team	Apps	(Gls)
1993–1995	Bristol City	3	(0)
1995	Cardiff City	3	(0)
1995	Oxford United	0	(0)
1995–1997	Gloucester City	60	(13)
- Trowbridge Town
- Clevedon Town
- → Forest Green Rovers (loan)
2001–2003	Bath City	62	(10)
2003–2006	Tiverton Town	57	(8)
2006–2007	Chippenham Town		
2007–2008	Mangotsfield United		
2009–2011	Paulton Rovers		

Managerial career
- 2008–2009: Mangotsfield United
- 2011: Paulton Rovers
- * Club domestic league appearances and goals

Paul Jason Milsom (born 5 October 1974) is an English former professional footballer and manager. During his career, he played as a forward and a central defender.

He began his career with Bristol City where he made his professional debut before being released in 1995. He joined Cardiff City where he made three appearances in the Football League before moving to Oxford United. After a single appearance, he was released by Oxford and dropped into non-league football.

== Career ==
Born in Bristol, Milsom began his career with his hometown club Bristol City. He made his professional debut for the club during the 1993–94 season but was released in March 1995 having made two further appearances. He joined Cardiff City, making two appearances as a substitute before starting in a 1–0 defeat to Bristol Rovers before being released at the end of the season. He subsequently signed for Oxford United, making one appearance for the club in the Football League Trophy, before dropping out of professional football.

He signed for Gloucester City in 1995, scoring on his debut against Chelmsford City. In two seasons at Meadow Park, he scored 13 goals and 60 appearances. After spells with Trowbridge Town and Clevedon Town, Milsom signed for Bath City on a two-year contract in July 2001 for a fee between £2000 and £3000, rejecting an offer from Worcester City. A first team regular for two seasons, he made over 60 appearances in all competitions for Bath, before joining Tiverton Town in 2003. He made his debut for the club on 20 September 2003 in a 3–3 draw with Chelmsford City and scored his first goal two months later in a 1–0 victory over Dover Athletic. At Tiverton, Milsom also began playing as a central defender. He made over 100 appearances for the club before leaving in 2006.

Milsom spent one season with Chippenham Town before joining Mangotsfield United in 2007. He was appointed manager of Mangotsfield during the 2007–08 season and helped the club avoid relegation after winning five consecutive matches. The following season, he was fired in January 2009 as the club struggled with Milsom blaming financial issues at the club, stating his budget had been "cut, and cut, and cut again."

In March 2011, Milsom was appointed joint-manager of Paulton Rovers along with Mark Harrington. Eventually, Harrington took over sole managerial responsibility with Milsom remaining as his assistant. Harrington was eventually replaced by Nick Bunyard with Milsom remaining as his assistant. The pair led the club to its highest ever league position before stepping down in 2015. The pair took charge of Frome Town in September 2015. However, Milsom left his role after less than a year.
