= Doug Witcomb =

Welsh footballer

Personal information
- Full name: Douglas Frederick Witcomb
- Date of birth: 18 April 1918
- Place of birth: Ebbw Vale, Wales
- Date of death: 6 August 1999 (aged 81)
- Place of death: Newport, Wales
- Positions: Defender; wing-half

Youth career
- Enfield

Senior career*
Years	Team	Apps	(Gls)
1937–1947	West Bromwich Albion	55	(3)
1941	→ Leicester City (guest)	1	(0)
1943-1944	Lovell's Athletic		
1947–1953	Sheffield Wednesday	224	(12)
1953–1954	Newport County	25	(0)
1954–????	Llandudno		

International career
1946–1947	Wales	3	(0)
- * Club domestic league appearances and goals

Douglas Frederick Witcomb (18 April 1918 – 6 August 1999) was a Welsh footballer who played for the Welsh national team and for West Bromwich Albion, Sheffield Wednesday and Newport County in the English Football League.

== Club career ==
A wing-half, Witcomb started playing at Enfield before beginning his Football League career with West Bromwich Albion in 1937. In a war-interrupted time with the club, he made 55 appearances and scored 3 goals.

During the war he was a guest-player for Lovell's Athletic, the works team for Lovell's sweet factory in Newport, Monmouthshire, Wales.

In March 1947, he joined Sheffield Wednesday and made 224 Football League appearances for the club, scoring 12 goals. He also made six FA Cup appearances for the side.

He joined Newport County for the 1953–54 season in November 1953, making 25 appearances before joining Llandudno.

He made one wartime appearance for Leicester City in 1941, playing against Tottenham Hotspur. He failed to score in a 3–0 defeat.

== International career ==
Witcomb attained three caps for the Welsh national team, playing in all three of his country's matches in the 1946–47 British Home Championship, making his debut on 19 October 1946 in a 3–1 victory over Scotland. Wales lost the remaining two matches, 3–0 to England and 2–1 to Ireland. He did not score any goals.

He played seven wartime matches for Wales, scoring one goal.
