= Abbey Moor Stadium =

Greyhound racing stadium in Glastonbury, England

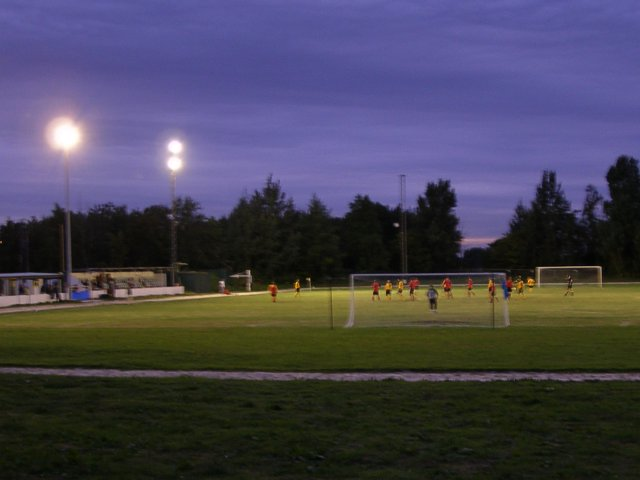
- Glastonbury FC at the Abbey Moor Stadium in 2006
- Interactive map of Abbey Moor Stadium
- Location: Godney Road, Glastonbury, Somerset
- Coordinates: 51°09′15″N 2°43′25″W

Abbey Moor Stadium is a football and former greyhound racing stadium on Godney Road, Glastonbury, Somerset.

== Origins ==
The stadium was constructed south of the Green's Drove and Common Moor junction on the east side of the Godney Road in an area known as Common Moor.

== Football ==
Glastonbury FC have played at the stadium since 1982.

== Greyhound racing ==
Racing was held on Tuesday and Friday evenings. The circumference of the track was 410 metres with races held over 280, 475 and 700 metres. Main races included the Glastonbury Derby and Glastonbury St Leger. The greyhound racing was independent (not affiliated to the sports governing body the National Greyhound Racing Club) and was known as a flapping track which was the nickname given to independent tracks.

The racing finished in 2000 and the track was covered over in 2000 but made a re-appearance in October 2005 until March 2006 before the greyhound racing ended for good.
