= 1920–21 Southern Football League =

The 1920–21 season was the 23rd in the history of the Southern League. The league was split into two sections, one for English clubs and one for Welsh clubs. The previous season had seen all Division One clubs elected to the Football League to form the new Third Division, leaving ten of the eleven clubs from Division Two (Caerphilly, who had finished bottom of Division Two, had resigned from the league) as the sole remaining members, all of which were from Wales. As a result, the league admitted thirteen new clubs from England (nine of which were reserve teams) and one from Wales (Aberdare Athletic).

Brighton & Hove Albion reserves won the English section, whilst Barry won the Welsh section. Brighton reserves were declared Southern League champions after defeating Barry in a championship play-off; after a 1–1 draw at Millwall's Den stadium, Brighton beat Barry 2–1 after eighty minutes of extra-time in a replay at Cardiff City's Ninian Park.

Alongside Barry, five other Southern League clubs applied for election to the two places in Division Three South of the Football League. Welsh Section runners-up Aberdare Athletic and the English Section's eighth-placed club Charlton Athletic won the most votes and joined the League the following season.

== English section ==
Southern Football League English Section
- Season: 1920–21
- Champions: Brighton & Hove Albion II (1st title)
- Promoted: Charlton Athletic
- Relegated: Chatham Town (resigned); Thornycrofts (resigned)
- Matches: 156
- Goals: 512 (3.28 per match)

All thirteen clubs in the English section were new to the league.

Pos	Team	Pld	W	D	L	GF	GA	GR	Pts	Qualification
1	Brighton & Hove Albion II	24	16	3	5	65	29	2.241	35	
2	Portsmouth II	24	13	7	4	44	20	2.200	33	
3	Millwall Athletic II	24	12	4	8	46	24	1.917	28	
4	Southampton II	24	10	7	7	53	35	1.514	27	
5	Boscombe	24	10	6	8	25	40	0.625	26	
6	Reading II	24	11	3	10	41	34	1.206	25	
7	Luton Town II	24	8	8	8	38	35	1.086	24	
8	Charlton Athletic	24	8	8	8	41	41	1.000	24	Elected to the Football League Third Division South
9	Watford II	24	9	4	11	43	45	0.956	22	
10	Norwich City II	24	7	7	10	31	39	0.795	21	
11	Gillingham II	24	6	5	13	32	47	0.681	17	
12	Chatham Town	24	5	6	13	24	47	0.511	16	Left league at end of season
13	Thornycrofts	24	4	6	14	29	76	0.382	14	Left league at end of season

Rules for classification: The system of using goal average to separate two teams tied on points was used up until the 1976–77 season. The points system: 2 points for a win, 1 point for a draw and 0 points for losing.

== Welsh section ==
Southern Football League Welsh Section
- Season: 1920–21
- Champions: Barry
- Promoted: Aberdare Athletic
- Relegated: Mid Rhondda (resigned); Llanelly (resigned)
- Matches: 156
- Goals: 512 (3.28 per match)

A total of 11 teams contest the division, including ten sides from previous season and one new team.

Newly elected teams:

- Aberdare Athletic

Pos	Team	Pld	W	D	L	GF	GA	GR	Pts	Qualification
1	Barry	20	13	4	3	35	12	2.917	30	
2	Aberdare Athletic	20	12	3	5	29	23	1.261	27	Elected to the Football League Third Division South
3	Ebbw Vale	20	10	5	5	34	23	1.478	25	
4	Pontypridd	20	10	3	7	34	23	1.478	23	
5	Mid Rhondda	20	10	3	7	26	18	1.444	23	Left league at end of season
6	Abertillery	20	8	5	7	35	24	1.458	21	
7	Ton Pentre	20	7	5	8	32	34	0.941	19	
8	Aberaman Athletic	20	5	7	8	30	33	0.909	17	
9	Llanelly	20	7	2	11	28	46	0.609	16	Left league at end of season
10	Mardy	20	2	6	12	18	39	0.462	10	
11	Porth Athletic	20	3	3	14	28	54	0.519	9	

Rules for classification: The system of using goal average to separate two teams tied on points was used up until the 1976–77 season. The points system: 2 points for a win, 1 point for a draw and 0 points for losing.

== Football League election ==
As Grimsby Town had been transferred from Division Three (which was to become Division Three South) to the new Division Three North, Crystal Palace had been promoted to Division Two, and no teams had been relegated from Division Two to the new Division Three South, there were two vacancies in the newly renamed division. The Arsenal representative at the Football League meeting proposed that the bottom two clubs in Division Three the previous season (Brentford and Gillingham) be re-elected automatically, a decision that was approved with only one representative against.

In total, eight non-League clubs applied, six from the Southern League, one from the Western League and one from the Welsh National League (South). Aberdare Athletic and Charlton Athletic were successful, and joined the Football League the following season.

Club	League	Votes
Aberdare Athletic	Southern League	38
Charlton Athletic	Southern League	30
Bath City	Western League	
Abertillery	Southern League	
Barry	Southern League	
Bridgend Town	Welsh National League (South)	
Pontypridd	Southern League	
Aberaman Athletic	Southern League	Withdrew before vote
