= 2001–02 Wessex Football League =

Wessex Football League
- Season: 2001–02
- Champions: Andover
- Relegated: Swanage Town & Herston

The 2001–02 Wessex Football League was the 16th season of the Wessex Football League. The league champions for the second time in their history, and the second consecutive season, were Andover. Runners-up Fleet Town were promoted back to the Southern League at the second attempt, but Swanage Town & Herston finished bottom and were relegated for the second time, the first being in 1996.

For sponsorship reasons, the league was known as the Jewson Wessex League.

== League table ==
The league consisted of one division of 23 clubs, the same as the previous season, after Portsmouth Royal Navy were relegated and one new club joined:

- Portland United, joining from the Dorset Combination League.

Pos	Team	Pld	W	D	L	GF	GA	GD	Pts	Qualification or relegation
1	Andover (C)	44	30	6	8	138	53	+85	96	
2	Fleet Town (P)	44	29	9	6	107	59	+48	95 (Note: Fleet Town had one point deducted.)	Joined the Southern League
3	A.F.C. Totton	44	29	7	8	104	50	+54	94	
4	Gosport Borough	44	26	11	7	101	41	+60	89	
5	Lymington & New Milton	44	26	6	12	94	47	+47	84	
6	Brockenhurst	44	27	2	15	99	57	+42	83	
7	A.F.C. Newbury	44	22	12	10	87	51	+36	78	
8	Wimborne Town	44	21	14	9	82	53	+29	77	
9	Moneyfields	44	23	7	14	98	64	+34	76	
10	Fareham Town	44	21	13	10	72	54	+18	76	
11	Bemerton Heath Harlequins	44	18	11	15	103	84	+19	65	
12	Thatcham Town	44	19	8	17	94	77	+17	65	
13	Eastleigh	44	18	9	17	91	71	+20	63	
14	Portland United	44	17	8	19	81	66	+15	59	
15	Christchurch	44	16	7	21	61	80	−19	55	
16	Cowes Sports	44	15	9	20	66	73	−7	54	
17	Blackfield & Langley	44	16	5	23	82	121	−39	53	
18	Bournemouth	44	14	7	23	61	84	−23	49	
19	B.A.T. Sports	44	13	8	23	46	67	−21	47	
20	Whitchurch United	44	5	5	34	27	116	−89	20	
21	Downton	44	5	4	35	42	139	−97	19	
22	Hamble A.S.S.C.	44	4	4	36	33	119	−86	16	
23	Swanage Town & Herston (R)	44	3	6	35	31	174	−143	15	Relegated to the Dorset Premier League

(C) Champions; (P) Promoted; (R) Relegated
