= Harry Foden =

British Virgin Islands footballer (born 2006)

Personal information
- Date of birth: 26 August 2006 (age 20)
- Place of birth: Southampton, England
- Height: 1.87 m (6 ft 2 in)
- Position: Goalkeeper

Team information
- Current team: Portland United

Senior career*
Years	Team	Apps	(Gls)
- Blandford United
2025–	Portland United		

International career^{‡}
2025–	British Virgin Islands	3	(0)
- * Club domestic league appearances and goals as of 21:42, 23 May 2026 (BST) ‡ National team caps and goals as of 21:42, 23 May 2026 (BST)

Harry Foden (born 26 August 2006) is a British Virgin Islands footballer who currently plays for Portland United in the Southern Football League Division One South. He has made 3 appearances for the British Virgin Islands national football team, in a friendlies against Anguilla and Bonaire keeping 2 clean sheets across the 3 games. In February 2024, Harry Foden was called up to the British Virgin Islands Under-20 national team for the CONCACAF Championship. The British Virgin Islands were drawn in a group with hosts Nicaragua, Belize, Anguilla, and Cuba. They finished third in the group, narrowly missing out on qualification for the next round. Foden produced several notable performances during the tournament, delivering numerous crucial saves against Cuba and playing a key role in the team’s victory over Belize.

He transferred to Portland United from Blandford United for the 2025–26 season.
