= 1921–22 Southern Football League =

The 1921–22 season was the 24th in the history of the Southern League. As in the previous season, the league was split into two sections, one for English clubs and one for Welsh clubs. Plymouth Argyle reserves won the English section, whilst Ebbw Vale won the Welsh section. Plymouth Argyle reserves were declared champions after defeating Ebbw Vale 3-0 in a championship play-off. Pontypridd and Bath City were the only two Southern League clubs to apply for election to the Football League, though neither was successful.

At the end of the season Gillingham reserves and Charlton Athletic reserves both left the league.

== English section ==
Southern Football League English Section
- Season: 1921–22
- Champions: Plymouth Argyle II (1st title)
- Promoted: none
- Relegated: Gillingham II (resigned); Charlton Athletic II (resigned)
- Matches: 342
- Goals: 1,083 (3.17 per match)

A total of 19 teams contest the division, including ten sides from previous season and nine new teams, seven of which were reserve teams.

Newly elected teams:

- Bath City
- Guildford United
- Bristol City II
- Bristol Rovers II
- Charlton Athletic II
- Exeter City II
- Plymouth Argyle II
- Southend United II
- Swindon Town II

Pos	Team	Pld	W	D	L	GF	GA	GR	Pts	Result
1	Plymouth Argyle II	36	22	5	9	91	38	2.395	49	
2	Portsmouth II	36	17	10	9	63	41	1.537	44	
3	Bristol City II	36	18	8	10	73	50	1.460	44	
4	Southampton II	36	19	5	12	70	47	1.489	43	
5	Gillingham II	36	17	9	10	65	47	1.383	43	Left league at end of season
6	Charlton Athletic II	36	18	6	12	69	54	1.278	42	Left league at end of season
7	Boscombe	36	17	5	14	38	55	0.691	39	
8	Luton Town II	36	17	4	15	50	54	0.926	38	
9	Watford II	36	15	7	14	65	53	1.226	37	
10	Brighton & Hove Albion II	36	12	13	11	60	52	1.154	37	
11	Bath City	36	16	5	15	55	53	1.038	37	
12	Swindon Town II	36	14	7	15	59	46	1.283	35	
13	Bristol Rovers II	36	13	7	16	50	82	0.610	33	
14	Millwall II	36	13	4	19	49	53	0.925	30	
15	Reading II	36	11	7	18	46	59	0.780	29	
16	Exeter City II	36	10	9	17	42	63	0.667	29	
17	Guildford United	36	11	6	19	44	56	0.786	28	
18	Norwich City II	36	10	6	20	47	86	0.547	26	
19	Southend United II	36	9	3	24	47	94	0.500	21	

Rules for classification: The system of using goal average to separate two teams tied on points was used until the 1976-77 season. The points system: 2 points for a win, 1 point for a draw and 0 points for losing.

== Welsh section ==
Southern Football League Welsh Section
- Season: 1921–22
- Champions: Ebbw Vale
- Promoted: none
- Relegated: none
- Matches: 72
- Goals: 225 (3.13 per match)

A total of 9 teams contest the division, including nine sides from previous season and one new team.

Newly elected teams:

- Swansea Town II

Pos	Team	Pld	W	D	L	GF	GA	GR	Pts
1	Ebbw Vale	16	11	3	2	33	11	3.000	25
2	Ton Pentre	16	9	4	3	35	14	2.500	22
3	Aberaman Athletic	16	7	5	4	25	19	1.316	19
4	Porth Athletic	16	6	6	4	31	20	1.550	18
5	Pontypridd	16	7	4	5	28	19	1.474	18
6	Swansea Town II	16	7	4	5	24	17	1.412	18
7	Barry	16	3	3	10	14	35	0.400	9
8	Abertillery	16	3	2	11	21	45	0.467	8
9	Mardy	16	2	3	11	14	43	0.326	7

Rules for classification: The system of using goal average to separate two teams tied on points was used until the 1976-77 season. The points system: 2 points for a win, 1 point for a draw and 0 points for losing.

== Football League election ==
In addition to the two clubs finishing bottom of Football League Third Division South, three non-League clubs joined the election process, of which two were from the Southern League. However, both League clubs were re-elected.

Club	League	Votes
Southend United	Football League Third Division South	36
Exeter City	Football League Third Division South	32
Pontypridd	Southern League	21
Bath City	Southern League	1
Llanelly	Welsh National League (South)	0
