= Abertillery Town F.C. =

Former association football club in Wales

Abertillery Town
- Full name: Abertillery Town Football Club
- Dissolved: 1950s
- Ground: Abertillery Recreation Grounds
Home colours

Abertillery Town F.C. was a Welsh football club based in Abertillery.

== History ==
The club were formed prior to 1910, and initially played in the South Wales League until being elected to Division Two of the Southern League in 1913–14. Although they left the league at the end of the 1913–14 season, they rejoined after World War I.

In 1920–21 they played in both the Welsh section of the Southern League and the Western League, finishing sixth in the Southern League and third in the Western League. They applied to join the Football League at the end of the season, but were unsuccessful.

The club then withdrew from the Western League, but continued to play in the Southern League, finishing eighth (out of nine) in 1921–22. However, in January 1923 the club withdrew from the league due to financial problems. They returned to playing in Welsh leagues, playing as Town or Athletic, until disbanding in the late 1950s. The club was reformed in 1982, and existed until 2000 when they merged with Cwmtillery AFC to form Abertillery Excelsior.

== Colours ==
The club wore royal blue jerseys with white knickers.

== Ground ==
The club originally played on a patch of land known as the Captain's Field, and in 1900 moved to the new Abertillery Recreation Grounds, a multi-purpose venue, although the club paid for the grandstand which was erected in 1906.
