= Western Football League =

Association football league in England

- Founded: 1892; 134 years ago
- Country: England
- Divisions: Premier Division; Division One
- Number of clubs: 42; 20 (Premier Division); 22 (Division One)
- Level on pyramid: Levels 9–10
- Feeder to: Southern League Division One South
- Relegation to: Dorset Premier League; Gloucestershire County League; Somerset County League; Wiltshire League; South West Peninsula League*; *Only relegated from & promoted to Premier Division
- Domestic cup: Les Phillips Cup
- Current champions: Barnstaple Town (Premier Division); Devizes Town (Division One) (2025–26)
- Website: Official
- Current: 2026–27 season

The Western Football League is a football league in South West England, covering Bristol, Cornwall, Devon, Somerset, western Dorset, parts of Gloucestershire and Wiltshire. The league's current main sponsor is Jewson, so it is also known as the Jewson Western League for sponsorship reasons.

Recent restructuring of the English football league system has placed the two divisions, known as the Premier Division and Division One (each a maximum of twenty-two clubs) at the ninth and tenth tiers overall, known as Step 5 and Step 6 of the National League System.

The champion club gain promotion to a Step 4 league, which in practice is almost always the Southern League Division One South. Below the Western League are four local leagues covering smaller areas, the Gloucestershire County League, the Somerset County League, the Dorset Premier League and the Wiltshire League. The South West Peninsula League Premier Divisions East and West are also feeders to the Western League but due to having Step 6 status (the same level as the Western League Division One), they feed directly into the Western League Premier Division.

== List of 2026–27 member clubs ==
=== Premier Division ===
Map showing the location of teams in Western Football League, Premier Division in 2024–25

Club	Home ground
Bridgwater United	Fairfax Park
Brislington	Ironmould Lane
Buckland Athletic	Homers Heath
Clevedon Town	Hand Stadium
Ivybridge Town	Erme Valley
Saltash United	Kimberley Stadium
Shepton Mallet	The Playing Fields
St Blazey	Blaise Park
Street	The Tannery
Torpoint Athletic	The Mill
Wellington	The Playing Field
Newquay	Mount Wise Stadium
Sidmouth Town	Manstone Lane
Brixham AFC	Wall Park
Bovey Tracey	Western Counties Roofing Ground
Liskeard Athletic	Lux Park
Portishead Town	Bristol Road
Tavistock Association	Langsford Park
Wells City	Athletic Ground

=== Division One ===
Club	Home ground
AEK Boco	Greenbank Road Playing Fields
Almondsbury	The Field
Avonmouth	North Bristol Park
Bitton	Recreation Ground
Bristol Telephones	BTRA Sports Ground
Cadbury Heath	Springfield
Calne Town	Bremhill View
Keynsham Town	AJN Stadium
Longwell Green Sports	Longwell Green Community Stadium
Mendip Broadwalk	Filwood Fields
Nailsea United	Grove Sports Centre
Odd Down	Lew Hill Memorial Ground
Oldland Abbotonians	Aitchison Playing Field
Radstock Town	The Southfields Recreation Ground
Shirehampton	Penpole Lane
Warminster Town	Weymouth Street
Welton Rovers	West Clewes
Wincanton Town	Wincanton Sports Ground

== History ==
The league was formed in 1892 as the Bristol & District League, and became the Western League in 1895. Another Bristol & District League was later formed, which remains active at a much lower level than the Western League. In the years before World War II, many teams played in both the Southern and Western Leagues; the Western League was considered as secondary to the Southern League.

On four occasions, member clubs have lifted the FA Vase, Tiverton Town twice, Taunton Town once and most recently Truro City, who beat A.F.C. Totton in 2007 at the first final to be held at the new Wembley Stadium before a competition record crowd of 27,754. Truro City were the only one of the three to win the FA Vase while in Division One, while none are current members of the Western League, as all three have since progressed to the Southern League.

=== Founder members ===
- Bedminster (later merged with Bristol South End to form Bristol City)
- Clevedon (later Clevedon Town)
- Clifton Association
- Eastville Rovers (later Bristol Rovers)
- Mangotsfield
- St. George (later merged with Roman Glass F.C. to form Roman Glass St George)
- Trowbridge Town
- Warmley
- Wells

== List of champions ==
=== Bristol & District League ===
Season	Division One champions (number of titles)	Division Two champions (number of titles)
1892–93	Warmley (1)	Division Two not active
1893–94	Warmley (2)	Warmley Bristol Reserves (1)
1894–95	Hereford Thistle (1)	Warmley Bristol Reserves (2)

=== Western Football League ===
Season	Division One champions (number of titles)	Division Two champions (number of titles)
1895–96	Warmley (3)	Barton Hill (1)
1896–97	Warmley (4)	Eastville Wanderers (1)

Season	Professional Section champions (number of titles)	Amateur Division One champions (number of titles)	Amateur Division Two champions (number of titles)
1897–98	Bristol City (1)	Bedminster (1)	Hanham (1)

Season	Division One champions (number of titles)	Division Two champions (number of titles)
1898–99	Swindon Town (1)	Staple Hill (1)
1899–1900	Bristol Rovers (1)	Bristol East (1)
1900–01	Portsmouth (1)	Bristol East (2)
1901–02	Portsmouth (2)	Bristol East (3)
1902–03	Portsmouth (3)	Bristol Rovers Reserves (1)
1903–04	Tottenham Hotspur (1)	Bristol City Reserves (1)
1904–05	Plymouth Argyle (1)	Bristol Rovers Reserves (2)
1905–06	Queens Park Rangers (1)	Bristol Rovers Reserves (3)
1906–07	West Ham United (1)	Staple Hill (2)
1907–08	Millwall Athletic (1)	Bristol City Reserves (2)
1908–09	Millwall Athletic (2)	Bristol City Reserves (3)
1909–10	Treharris (1)	Division Two not active
1910–11	Bristol City Reserves (1)	Division Two not active
1911–12	Welton Rovers (1)	Division Two not active
1912–13	Bristol Rovers Reserves (1)	Division Two not active
1913–14	Cardiff City Reserves (1)	Division Two not active
1915–16 to 1918–19	League suspended due to World War I	
1919–20	Douglas (1)	Frome Town (1)
1920–21	Bristol City Reserves (2)	Peasedown St John (1)
1921–22	Yeovil & Petters United (1)	Clandown (1)
1922–23	Weymouth (1)	Division Two not active
1923–24	Lovell's Athletic (1)	Division Two not active
1924–25	Yeovil & Petters United (2)	Division Two not active
1925–26	Bristol City Reserves (3)	Poole (1)
1926–27	Bristol City Reserves (4)	Poole Reserves (1)
1927–28	Plymouth Argyle Reserves (1)	Trowbridge Town (1)
1928–29	Bristol Rovers Reserves (2)	Bath City Reserves (1)
1929–30	Yeovil & Petters United (3)	Trowbridge Town (2)
1930–31	Exeter City Reserves (1)	Portland United (1)
1931–32	Plymouth Argyle Reserves (2)	Portland United (2)
1932–33	Exeter City Reserves (2)	Swindon Town Reserves (1)
1933–34	Bath City (1)	Weymouth (1)
1934–35	Yeovil & Petters United (4)	Swindon Town Reserves (2)
1935–36	Bristol Rovers Reserves (3)	Swindon Town Reserves (3)
1936–37	Bristol Rovers Reserves (4)	Weymouth (2)
1937–38	Bristol City Reserves (5)	Weymouth (3)
1938–39	Lovell's Athletic (2)	Trowbridge Town (3)
1939–40	Trowbridge Town (1)	Division Two not active
1940–41 to 1944–45	League suspended due to World War II	
1945–46	Bristol Rovers Reserves (5)	Division Two not active
1946–47	Trowbridge Town (2)	Clandown (2)
1947–48	Trowbridge Town (3)	Salisbury (1)
1948–49	Glastonbury (1)	Chippenham United (1)
1949–50	Wells City (1)	Barnstaple Town (1)
1950–51	Glastonbury (2)	Stonehouse (1)
1951–52	Chippenham Town (1)	Bideford (1)
1952–53	Barnstaple Town (1)	Chippenham Town Reserves (1)
1953–54	Weymouth Reserves (1)	Bristol Rovers Colts (1)
1954–55	Dorchester Town (1)	Yeovil Town Reserves (1)
1955–56	Trowbridge Town (4)	Torquay United Reserves (1)
1956–57	Poole Town (1)	Cinderford Town (1)
1957–58	Salisbury (1)	Poole Town Reserves (1)
1958–59	Yeovil Town Reserves (1)	Bath City Reserves (2)
1959–60	Torquay United Reserves (1)	Welton Rovers (1)
1960–61	Salisbury (2)	Division Two not active
1961–62	Bristol City 'A' (1)	Division Two not active
1962–63	Bristol City 'A' (2)	Division Two not active
1963–64	Bideford (1)	Division Two not active
1964–65	Welton Rovers (2)	Division Two not active
1965–66	Welton Rovers (3)	Division Two not active
1966–67	Welton Rovers (4)	Division Two not active
1967–68	Bridgwater Town (1)	Division Two not active
1968–69	Taunton (1)	Division Two not active
1969–70	Glastonbury (3)	Division Two not active
1970–71	Bideford (2)	Division Two not active
1971–72	Bideford (3)	Division Two not active
1972–73	Devizes Town (1)	Division Two not active
1973–74	Welton Rovers (5)	Division Two not active
1974–75	Falmouth Town (1)	Division Two not active
1975–76	Falmouth Town (2)	Division Two not active
1976–77	Falmouth Town (3)	Saltash United (1)
1977–78	Falmouth Town (4)	Keynsham Town (1)
1978–79	Frome Town (1)	Bournemouth Reserves (1)
1979–80	Barnstaple Town (2)	Melksham Town (1)
1980–81	Bridgwater Town (2)	Chippenham Town (1)
1981–82	Bideford (4)	Shepton Mallet Town (1)
1982–83	Bideford (5)	Bristol Manor Farm (1)
1983–84	Exmouth Town (1)	Bristol City Reserves (4)
1984–85	Saltash United (1)	Portway Bristol (1)
1985–86	Exmouth Town (2)	Portway Bristol (2)
1986–87	Saltash United (2)	Swanage Town & Herston (1)
1987–88	Liskeard Athletic (1)	Welton Rovers (2)
1988–89	Saltash United (3)	Larkhall Athletic (1)
1989–90	Taunton Town (2)	Ottery St Mary (1)
1990–91	Mangotsfield United (1)	Minehead (1)
1991–92	Weston-super-Mare (1)	Westbury United (1)
1992–93	Clevedon Town (1)	Odd Down (1)
1993–94	Tiverton Town (1)	Barnstaple Town (2)
1994–95	Tiverton Town (2)	Brislington (1)
1995–96	Taunton Town (3)	Bridgwater Town (1)
1996–97	Tiverton Town (3)	Melksham Town (2)
1997–98	Tiverton Town (4)	Bishop Sutton (1)
1998–99	Taunton Town (4)	Minehead (2)
1999–2000	Taunton Town (5)	Devizes Town (1)
2000–01	Taunton Town (6)	Team Bath (1)
2001–02	Bideford (6)	Frome Town (2)
2002–03	Team Bath (1)	Torrington (1)
2003–04	Bideford (7)	Hallen (1)
2004–05	Bideford (8)	Willand Rovers (1)
2005–06	Bideford (9)	Dawlish Town (1)
2006–07	Corsham Town (1)	Truro City (1)
2007–08	Truro City (1)	Wellington (1)
2008–09	Bitton (1)	Larkhall Athletic (2)
2009–10	Bideford (10)	Wells City (1)
2010–11	Larkhall Athletic (1)	Merthyr Town (1)
2011–12	Merthyr Town (1)	Cadbury Heath (1)
2012–13	Bishop Sutton (1)	Sherborne Town (1)
2013–14	Larkhall Athletic (2)	Bradford Town (1)
2014–15	Melksham Town (1)	Barnstaple Town (3)
2015–16	Odd Down (1)	Chipping Sodbury Town (1)
2016–17	Bristol Manor Farm (1)	Wellington (2)
2017–18	Street (1)	Westbury United (2)
2018–19	Willand Rovers (1)	Keynsham Town (2)
2019–20	League abandoned due to COVID-19 pandemic	
2020–21	League curtailed due to COVID-19 pandemic	
2021–22	Tavistock (1)	Sherborne Town (2)
2022–23	Mousehole (1)	Brislington (2)
2023–24	Helston Athletic (1)	Portishead Town (1)
2024–25	Portishead Town (1)	Hallen (2)

== Teams promoted to Southern League (since 1946) ==
The area covered by the Western League is coloured in dark green.

Year	Team	Position
1949	Weymouth	3rd
1957	Poole Town	1st
1958	Trowbridge Town	5th
1968	Salisbury	2nd
1971	Andover	2nd
1972	Bideford	1st
1972	Minehead	2nd
1972	Dorchester Town	7th
1977	Taunton Town	9th
1982	Bridgwater Town	3rd
1992	Weston-super-Mare	1st
1993	Clevedon Town	1st
1999	Tiverton Town	2nd
2000	Mangotsfield United	2nd
2001	Chippenham Town	2nd
2002	Taunton Town	2nd
2003	Team Bath	1st
2004	Paulton Rovers	2nd
2007	Bridgwater Town	2nd
2008	Truro City	1st
2009	Frome Town	2nd
2010	Bideford	1st
2012	Merthyr Town	1st
2014	Larkhall Athletic	1st
2015	Slimbridge	3rd
2016	Barnstaple Town	2nd
2017	Bristol Manor Farm	1st
2018	Street	1st
2018	Melksham Town	2nd
2019	Willand Rovers	1st
2021	Plymouth Parkway	1st
2022	Tavistock	1st
2022	Exmouth Town	2nd
2023	Mousehole	1st
2024	Helston Athletic	1st
2024	Falmouth Town	2nd
