= Portland United F.C. =

Association football club in England

Coordinates: 50°33′04″N 2°25′52″W

Portland United
- Full name: Portland United Football Club
- Nickname: The Blues
- Founded: 1921
- Ground: Camp & Satherley Stadium, Grove Corner, Isle of Portland
- Capacity: 1,300
- Chairman: Matthew Lucas
- Manager: Craig Adams & Kyle Critchell
- League: Southern League Division One South
- 2025–26: Wessex League Premier Division, 3rd of 20 (promoted via play-offs)
- Website: https://portlandunitedfc.uk/
Home colours	Away colours

Portland United Football Club is a football club based on the Isle of Portland, Dorset, England. In the 2024-25 season, they are members of the Southern League Division One South. The club is affiliated to the Dorset County Football Association and is a FA chartered Standard club. Their nickname is "The Blues"

== History ==
The club was established in 1920 following a meeting at the Drill Hall on Monday 7th June, 1920 and joined the Dorset County & District League. They were continuously amongst the top clubs in the league but without actually taking the title. They joined the Western League Division Two in 1925. The club went on to win this division twice before the Second World War, but never achieved promotion to Division One. During this time the club made its debut in the FA Cup in the 1928–29 season and the club won the Dorset Senior Cup on four occasions.

After the Second World War the club rejoined the Western Football League for the 1946–47 season but this time were placed in Division One. The club then spent the next 24 seasons in this division, during which time they finished as runners-up once and went on to win six more Dorset Senior Cup finals. The club then left the Western League to join the Dorset Football Combination League for the start of the 1970–71 season. The club then won the league at their first attempt. However, it would be another 28 seasons that the club would have to wait for another league title in the 1998–99 campaign, when they achieved the double by winning the league cup as well. They repeated this success the following season as well.

In 1994, the club moved from their original home of Grove Corner to New Grove Corner, when the Crown decided it needed the land for mineral extraction. After finishing as league runners-up and with improvements made to their new ground, the club joined the Wessex Football League for the start of the 2001–02 season. The club then remained in the Wessex League until the end of the 2005–06 season, when they dropped back into the Dorset Premier Football League. Since then the club won the league two times more, once in the 2007–08 season, though they made the decision not to seek promotion, and again the following season.

In the 2013–14 season the club became winners of the Dorset Premier League for the seventh time in their history. After a 9-season absence, they were promoted to the 2015–16 Wessex League via a runners-up finish which was approved by the FA Leagues Committee.

== Current squad ==
Note: Flags indicate national team as defined under FIFA eligibility rules; some limited exceptions apply. Players may hold more than one non-FIFA nationality.

No.	Pos.	Nation	Player
—	GK	VGB	Harry Foden
—	GK	ENG	Callum Smalley
—	DF	ENG	George Stuttle
—	DF	ENG	Sam Gadsby
—	DF	ENG	Callum Corbridge
—	DF	ENG	Tom Peach
—	MF	ENG	Jacob Coombs
—	MF	ENG	Taylor Warden
—	MF	ENG	Ben Morris
—	MF	ENG	Jack Delves
—	MF	ENG	Jamie Cleaver

No.	Pos.	Nation	Player
—	MF	ENG	Josh Williams
—	MF	ENG	Hayden Scott
—	MF	ENG	Alfie Woolford
—	MF	ENG	Euan Joyce
—	FW	ENG	Josh Camp
—	FW	ENG	Remus Nixon
—	FW	ENG	Patrick Jenkins
—	FW	ENG	Greg Borthwick

As of 13/03/26.

== Ground ==
Portland United play their home games at Camp & Satherley Stadium, Grove Corner, Grove Road, Portland. DT5 1DP.

== Honours ==
=== League Honours ===
- Wessex Football League Premier Division :
  - Winners (1): 2016-17
- Wessex Football League Division One :
  - Winners (1): 2015-16
- Western Football League Division Two :
  - Winners (2): 1930-31, 1931-32
- Dorset Premier League :
  - Winners (6): 1970–71, 1998–99, 1999–00, 2007–08, 2008–09, 2012–13, 2013–14

=== Cup Honours ===
- Dorset Premier League Cup :
  - Winners (4): 1997–98, 1998–99, 1999–00, 2008–09

== Records ==
- Highest League Position: 2nd in Western Football League 1965–66
- FA Cup best performance: Fourth qualifying round – 1928–29, 1929–30, 1953–54, 1957–58, 1958–59, 1965–66,
- FA Trophy best performance: First qualifying round – 1969–70
- FA Amateur Cup best performance: Third round – 1930–31, 1931–32
- FA Vase best performance: Second round – 2001–02, 2023–24, 2025–26
- Highest Attendance: 4,127 vs Weymouth January 1949

== Former coaches ==
1. Managers/Coaches that have played/managed in the football league or any foreign equivalent to this level (i.e. fully professional league).
2. Managers/Coaches with full international caps.
- (Scotland) Jimmy Dailey
