= Street F.C. =

Association football club in England

Coordinates: 51°06′58″N 2°44′38″W

Street Football Club
- Full name: Street Football Club
- Nickname: The Cobblers
- Founded: 1880
- Ground: The Tannery, Street
- Capacity: 1,500 (150 seated)
- Manager: Scott Laird
- League: Western League Premier Division
- 2025–26: Western League Premier Division, 12th of 18
- Website: https://www.streetfc.co.uk/
Home colours	Away colours

Street Football Club are a football club based in Street in Somerset, England. They are currently members of the Western League Premier Division and play at the Tannery. The club is affiliated to the Somerset County FA.

== Club history ==
Founded in 1880, Street FC is one of the oldest clubs in Somerset. Nicknamed The Cobblers due to a large shoe making industry in the village the early years were extremely successful and Street won the Somerset Senior League four times before the end of the century, the first occasion being the 1882–83 season.

Street was also to taste early success in the Somerset Senior Cup winning the trophy in the 1897–98 season and again two years later. After winning the Somerset Senior League again in 1910 and the Senior Cup the following season, the club made the decision to join the Western League and in the first season finished eighth out of eleven clubs. With the Western League being disbanded in 1914 due to The Great War, Street re-joined the league at the start of the 1919–20 season in the newly formed Division Two. However, Division Two was disbanded three years later and the club re-joined The Somerset Senior League where they remained for the next eight years.

The first year back in the Western League Second Division was none too successful with the club finishing 16th out of seventeen but two years later, Street finished runners up to Swindon Town Reserves. They repeated the feat in 1938 when again they finished second, 12 points behind Weymouth. However, there was no promotion from the Second Division to the First Division.

The following season 1938–39, The Cobblers had one of their finest hours when they reached the first round of the 1938–39 FA Cup and were drawn away to Division Three South side Ipswich Town on 26 November 1938. Representing the side of that day were numerous players with Football League experience, notably: E Maggs, G Webber and Albert Banfield (Bristol City), F Farr (Northampton), L Rose (Everton), N & C Willey (Portsmouth) - but although they put up a gallant fight they were eventually beaten 7–0.

After the war Street returned to the Western League in the First Division and in the 1947–48 season had another memorable season finishing third in the league and reaching the 1947–48 FA Cup first round for the second time after knocking out Yeovil Town 2-1 along the way in front of a crown of 5,000 at The Victoria Field. Once again the road to Wembley ended there as they were beaten 5–0 by Cheltenham Town. Street then went through a lean spell and was relegated to Division Two in 1955 and then re-joining the Somerset Senior League in 1960 when the Western League Division Two was disbanded.

In the mid-1960s the introduction of ex-pro Tommy Wilson as manager saw the club's fortunes rise again and at the same time they left the Victoria Field and moved to the Turnpike Ground where they were crowned The Somerset League champions in 1964 and again in 1966.

In 1967 Street moved to their present home at the Tannery Ground but times were lean and by 1992 they had dropped to the Third Division. The introduction of Noel O’Hare as manager saw an upturn of fortunes and successive promotions came in his first two seasons. At the end of the 1993–94 season O'Hare left the club and Simon White was appointed. White left after only 11 games but they went on to gain promotion again and reached the final of The League Cup under the guidance of Ken Randall.

The following season, 1996–97, Simon White returned to and led Street to the Senior League Championship for a record eighth time and back into the Western League after a 47-year absence. The following season floodlights were erected, a seated stand added and the changing rooms enlarged. After guiding Street to a third and fourth-place finish in the first two seasons Simon left the club midway through the following campaign. Julian Thresher and Neil Seymour then took over the reins followed by Gerry Pearson and then Alan Hooker, until Simon White was appointed at the start of the 2005–06 season and led the club to promotion to the Western League at the first attempt.

Dan Badman took over as first team manager in 2011–12 and has been proud to lead the team to their all-time best in 2012–13 finishing sixth and beating it again in 2013–14 finishing in fifth position. 2015–16 saw the Cobblers finish seventh and getting to the semi-finals of the Somerset Premier Cup, at the end of the season after four and a half years, Badman stepped down due to work commitments.

Street moved swiftly and appointed former Bitton, Bridgwater Town and Paulton Rovers manager Richard Fey to take over at the helm, his first season in charge saw the Cobblers claim a second-placed finish. They went one better and became champions in 2017–18 season, winning 26 consecutive games, amassing 99 points, scoring 100 goals, and having the best points per game ratio in the country of any team at that level. The side finished 15 points clear of Melksham Town, a massive achievement in the clubs history.

Promotion to the Southern League followed, with the team finishing a respectable eighth in 2018–19. The club was unable to sustain such lofty ambitions and chose to take voluntary demotion back down to the Western league, a huge disappointment to everyone involved in its record-breaking success.

In June 2019 Des Bulpin was appointed as manager following on from Richard Fey's departure.

== Ground ==
Street play their home games at The Tannery Ground, Middlebrooks, Street, Somerset, BA16 0TA.

== Records ==
- Best FA Cup performance: 1st round, 1938–39
- Best FA Trophy performance: 2nd round replay, 2018–19
- Best FA Vase performance: 5th round, 2006–07

== Honours ==
Honour	Year(s)
Western League; Premier Champions	2017–18
Western League; Division One runners up	1952–53, 2016-17
Western League; Division Two runners up	1932–33, 1937–38
Somerset Senior League; Champions	1892–93, 1895–96, 1897–98, 1898–99, 1909–10, 1963–64, 1965–66, 1995–96
Somerset Senior Cup; Winners	1897–98, 1899–1900, 1910–11
Somerset Senior League Cup; Finalists	1995–96
