= Radstock Town F.C. =

Association football club in England

Coordinates: 51°17′23″N 2°26′25″W

Radstock Town
- Full name: Radstock Town Football Club
- Nickname: The Miners
- Founded: 1895 (as Radstock)
- Ground: The Southfields Recreation Ground, Radstock
- Capacity: 1,250
- Manager: Ian Lanning
- League: Western League Division One
- 2025–26: Western League Division One, 17th of 20
- Website: www.radstocktownfc.co.uk
Home colours	Away colours

Radstock Town Football Club is a football club based in Radstock, Somerset, England. It is a member of the Western League Division One and plays at the Southfields Recreation Ground. The club is affiliated to the Somerset County FA.

== History ==
Believed to be one of the oldest clubs in the county of Somerset, Radstock Town Football Club's official year of foundation, as recognised by The Football Association, was 1895, although there is evidence that appears to show that a Radstock team was playing as early as the 1860s. After playing in the Western League in 1897–98 as Radstock, they rejoined the League as Radstock Town in 1903–04, along with near neighbours Welton Rovers but resigned at the end of the 1910–11 season. They again rejoined the League after the First World War and the 1920s were to see a number of top six finishes. Indeed, 1923–24 was the club's most successful season, finishing as runners up to Lovell's Athletic by six points.

In the early days the club played home games at Roundhill, where the 'A' team and some youth section sides still play, before moving to Southill Park for a number of years, where their stay was enforced because of an American tank division being billeted at Southfield during the Second World War. The original move to Southfield took place in 1927, when as a First World War memorial the miners purchased the field through an issue of £5 shares. Unfortunately, it appears that the issue was not totally successful and as a consequence the control of the ground was gifted to the then Urban District Council and the Miners Welfare, who remain ultimately responsible for the area to this day.

The club's lengthy spell in the League came to an end after the 1959–60 season, when they, along with a number of other Somerset clubs – including Clandown, Frome Town, Peasedown Miners Welfare and Street – left to join county leagues. Radstock- along with Frome Town and Clandown – chose to compete in the Wiltshire League, and won the championship in 1965–66 and 1966–67. In the 1970s Radstock switched to the Somerset County League, which they won in 1976–77 and again in 1978–79. Radstock rejoined the Western League for the 1979–80 season. They spent the next few years either in Division One or at the foot of the Premier Division.

At the end of the 1993–94 season Radstock were relegated to the Somerset County League, where they remained for ten seasons before gaining promotion after finishing in third place in 2003–04. The following season, third place in Division One was sufficient to ensure another promotion and the club is now established back in the Premier Division of the Western League. Relegation back to division one came at the end of 2013/14 season following a number of seasons struggling at the bottom of the table. The club remain in the first division despite competing in the play-offs twice but on both occasions were beaten in the semi-finals.

With thirteen victories to its name the club has won the Somerset Senior Cup on more occasions than any other side in the county. The first time was in the competition's inaugural year of 1895–96 when they defeated Wells City 4–0 in a replayed final at Midsomer Norton. Other victories came in 1905–06, 1927–28, 1929–30, 1931–32, 1936–37, 1938–39, 1959–60, 1963–64, 1965–66, 1973–74, 1982–83 and 1984/85.

== Ground ==
Radstock Town play their home games at Southfields Recreation Ground, Southfields, Radstock, BA3 3NZ.

== Football staff ==
- First Team Manager: Ian Lanning
- Assistant Manager: Ollie Millett
- Goalkeeper Coach: Neil King
- First Team Coach: Toby Mitchelmore
- Development Manager: Dexter Miller
- Vets: Ben Cherry
- U18s Manager: Ian Lanning

== Honours ==
- Western Football League Division One
  - Runners-up 1923–24, 1985–86, 2023/24
- Western Football League Division Two
  - Runners-up 1920–21, 1926–27
- Somerset Senior League Premier Division Champions 1927-28, 1972-73, 1976-77, 1978-79
- Somerset Senior League Division One
  - Champions 1996–97
- Somerset County League Division Three Champions 2022-23
- Somerset Senior Cup
  - Winners (13): 1895–96, 1905–06, 1927–28, 1929–30, 1931–32 (shared with Wells City), 1936–37, 1938–39, 1959–60, 1963–64, 1965–66, 1973–74, 1982–83, 1984–85
- Wiltshire Premier League Champions 1963-64, 1965-66, 1967-68, 1971-72

== Records ==
- FA Cup
  - Fourth Qualifying Round 1925–26, 1926–27, 1928–29, 1938–39, 1945–46, 1946–47, 1954–55
- FA Vase
  - Second Round 1975–76, 1976–77, 1980–81, 1988–89, 2025-26
- FA Youth Cup
  - First Round Proper 2016-17
