= Lovell's Athletic F.C. =

Former association football club in Wales

Lovell's Athletic
- Full name: Lovell's Athletic Football Club
- Nickname: the Toffeemen
- Founded: 1918
- Dissolved: 1969
- Ground: Rexville, Alderney Street, Newport
Home colours

Lovell's Athletic F.C. was the works team for Lovell's sweet factory in Newport, Monmouthshire, Wales, which played professional football from 1918 until 1969.

== History ==
Lovell's joined the Western Football League in 1923 and won the title in their inaugural season. In 1928, they moved to the Southern League, but left in 1930, with the first team taking the reserves' place in the Welsh Football League. They entered a second side in The Football Combination for the 1930–31 season only, finishing bottom of the inaugural Second Division with 15 points from their 26 games. Teams in that league included Bournemouth, Bristol City, Norwich City, Peterborough United and Swindon Town.

Lovell's rejoined the Western League in 1931. They won their second title in 1938–39, and the following year joined the Southern League's wartime competition. During World War II, Newport County did not field a team, so Lovell's were the premier team in Newport for that period. In the 1945–46 FA Cup, they reached the third round, losing 12–3 on aggregate in a two-legged match against Wolverhampton Wanderers, having defeated AFC Bournemouth of the Football League Third Division South in the first round 6–4 on aggregate.

Lovell's returned to the Southern League in 1947. The 1947–48 season saw the club's finest achievement, beating Shrewsbury Town in the Welsh Cup final at the Racecourse Ground, thanks to three unanswered goals in extra-time. The club duly applied for election to the Football League, along with nine other non-league teams, at the close of the season. However the two Third Division South teams seeking re-election, Norwich City and Brighton and Hove Albion, were both re-elected, almost unanimously, Lovell's not receiving a single vote.

Lovell's left the Southern League in 1959 after finishing in the relegation zone of the North West Division, due to the expense of running a side at a semi-professional level with regular crowds down to 200. It continued to play in the Welsh League until the 1968–69 season. On 8 May 1969, John Lovell, son of the club's founder Harold, announced the club was to disband once it had completed its last three league fixtures, due to a mix of a lack of support and the factory's need for development which required the possible use of the ground. The club's final fixture was at Pembroke Borough on 24 May.

== Colours ==
The club's usual colours were red shirts and white shorts, although the club experimented with those colours in a V design in the 1920s. In the late 1930s, and occasionally up until 1950, the club wore red, white, and blue hoops.

== Ground ==
The club played at Rexville. The ground is now a housing estate named "The Turnstiles".

== Amateur internationals ==
Lovell's Athletic supplied a number of players to the Wales Amateurs team, including several captains. The club's first amateur international was EJ Jenkins who faced England at Plymouth in 1925. Jenkins later became honorary secretary and team manager. After Jenkins, there were:

- WR Hillman
- J McDougall
- Len Evans
- AE Miles
- Idwal Robling, who later became a BBC commentator
- E Thomas
- S Jones
- Albert Clarke
- Kitchener 'Kitch' Fisher
- WT Williams
- TR Woods
- Garnett Edmunds
- JB Griffiths
- Gwyn Morgan
- Alan Paul
- Len Burch
- Ray Hawthorne
- Graham Reynolds
- T Grace
- K Fitzgerald
- Tony Wood.

== Other notable people ==
Lovell's players who went onto the professional game or win international winners include Doug Witcomb who later won three Wales caps, Harry Clarke who won the League with Tottenham Hotspur in 1951 and one England in 1954, and former Wales international Billy Lucas.

== Honours ==
Western League

- Champions: 1924, 1939
- Runners-up: 1936

Southern League Midland Division

- Joint Champions: 1940

Welsh Football League

- Winners: 1931–32, 1937–38, 1938–39, 1945–46, 1946–47, 1947–48, 1965–66

Welsh Cup

- Winners: 1948
- Runners-up: 1959

Welsh Amateur Cup

- Winners: 1925–26, 1926–27, 1927–28, 1953–54
- Runners-up: 1922–23, 1923–24, 1938–39

South Wales FA Senior Cup

- Winners: 1930–31, 1936–37, 1948–49, 1954–55

Monmouthshire/Gwent Senior Cup

- Winners (10): 1929–30, 1930–31, 1936–37, 1937–38, 1938–39, 1946–47, 1948–49, 1949–50, 1951–52, 1954–55

Monmouthshire/Gwent Amateur Cup

- Winners (2): 1925–26, 1928–29

== History ==
- FA Cup progress: Third round defeat by Wolverhampton Wanderers, 1946.
- Record FA Cup victory: 7–1 vs. Stonehouse, 1954.
- Record Welsh Cup victory: 3–0 vs. Shrewsbury Town, 1948 final.
