= Frome Town F.C. =

English football club

Coordinates: 51°14′05″N 2°18′32″W

Frome Town
- Full name: Frome Town Football Club
- Nicknames: The Robins, The Dodge
- Founded: 1904
- Stadium: Badgers Hill
- Capacity: 3,000 (500 seated)
- Chair: Courtney Fong
- Manager: Danny Greaves
- League: Southern League Premier Division South
- 2025–26: Southern League Division One South, 1st of 22 (promoted)
- Website: frometownfc.com
Home colours	Away colours

Frome Town Football Club is an English football club based in Frome, Somerset. They play in the Southern League Premier Division South. The club's nickname is the Robins and they play in a predominantly red kit.

== History ==
The club was founded in 1904, and started playing in the Wiltshire Premier League at their home ground of Badgers Hill A few seasons later, the club experienced success when they won the Somerset Senior League Championship in the 1906–07 season, followed by two more in 1908–09 and 1910–11 as well as winning the Wiltshire League Championship in the 1909–10 season. After the league successes, the club made its debut in the FA Cup in the 1911–12 season, reaching the fifth qualifying round before losing 4–1 to Southport Central.

The club then joined the Western league in the 1919–20 season starting in Division two, where they won the division at their first attempt. However, they did not gain promotion and stayed in the league for a further two seasons before leaving, only to return to Division two for another three seasons at the beginning of the 1924–25 season. The club returned to the Western league in the 1931–32 season and stayed there for eight seasons, never leaving Division two. During this time, the club had success in the Somerset Senior FA Cup, winning it in the 1932–22 and 1933–34 seasons.

After the Second World War, the club again joined the Western League again for the beginning of the 1946–47 season starting in Division One, but being relegated back to Division Two at the end of the season. The club also played its first FA Cup game for 35 years in the same season. The 1954–55 season saw the club reach the first round of the FA Cup, where they were defeated by Football League side Leyton Orient in front of a record crowd of 8,000. The same season also saw the club gain promotion to Division one, when they finished as Runners-up in Division two. The club, however, was relegated back to Division two four seasons later and left the Western league, at the end of their first season back in Division two to join the Wiltshire League.

The club once again joined the Western league in the 1963–64 season and joined the top division. The club spent the next 32 seasons in the top division during which time they went on to become champions once during the 1978–79 season. The club also experienced cup success during their time in the Western Premier Division, winning the Somerset Premier Cup three times in the 1966–67, 1968–69, and 1982–83 seasons, as well as winning the Western League Cup twice and the Western counties floodlit cup once. At the end of the 1995–96 season, the club was relegated to Division One.

At the end of the 1999–00 season, the club finished bottom of Division one but were spared relegation as the league was restructured that season. Two seasons later, at the end of the 2001–02 campaign, the club were Division One champions, and promoted back to the Premier Division. In the 2003–04 campaign, the club gained media attention when they asked local white witch Titania Hardie, to help improve their home form as they struggled at Badgers Hill. The witch blamed the Decor of the changing rooms, and once the club changed them the team won eight of their nine remaining home games.

At the end of the 2008–09 season, the club finished as runners-up in the Premier Division and this was enough to secure promotion to the Southern Football League in Division One South & West, as champions Bitton did not apply for promotion as their ground would not have passed the Southern League ground grading committee's standards. The club also achieved cup success that season when they beat Paulton Rovers 3–1 to win the Somerset Premier Cup. In their second season in Division One South and West, the club gained promotion to the Premier Division when they beat Sholing 1–0 in the play-off final, under the management of Darren Perrin. The club has since remained in the Premier Division of the Southern Football League.

In 2019, When reviewing the current club crest, Frome Town FC agreed that the design was too detailed and didn't display well on colour and image backgrounds with digital files no longer accessible, and changed logo.

In the 2023–24 season, they reached the 3rd round of the FA Trophy the furthest they have gone in the competition after beating Worthing 4–3 on penalties after a 2–2 draw at Badgers Hill.

The 2025–26 season saw Frome Town promoted back to the Southern League Premier Division South as Division One South champions.

== Players ==
=== Current squad (2024-25) ===
Note: Flags indicate national team as defined under FIFA eligibility rules; some limited exceptions apply. Players may hold more than one non-FIFA nationality.

No.	Pos.	Nation	Player
1	GK		Kyle Phillips
2	DF		Matt Wood
3	MF		Sam Heal
4	DF		Sam Teale
5	DF		Pierce Michell
6	MF		Joe Budd
7	FW		Jon Davies
8	DF		George Rigg
9	FW		Curtis Hutson
10	MF		Zak Drew
11	FW		Albie Hopkins

No.	Pos.	Nation	Player
12	FW		Marcus Day
13	GK		Tom Roberts
14	DF		Warren Maidment
15	MF		Ethan Vaughan
16	FW		Evra Yao
17	DF		Alex Monks
18	DF		James Ollis
19	MF		Joe O’Loughlin
20	MF		Matt Smith
21	GK		Sebastian Tylek
22	MF		Reece Rusher

== Management team ==
Position	Name
Manager	Danny Greaves
Assistant Manager	Neil Simons
Head Coach	Craig Loxton
First Team Coach	Matt Lewton
Goalkeeping Coach	TBC
Kit Man	Shaun Baker
Analytics	Fin Hopkins
Sports Therapist	Tom Dalby

== Ground ==
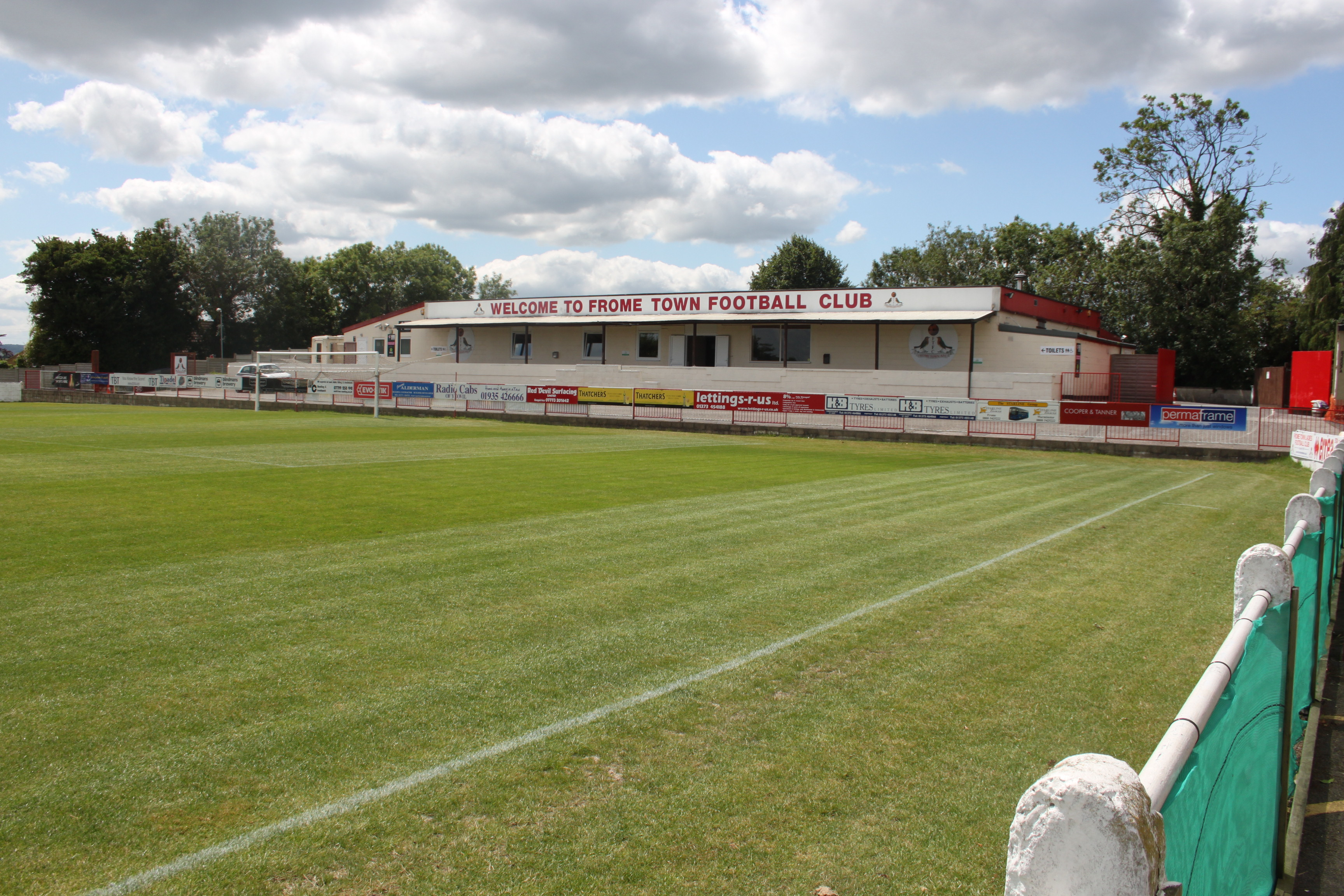
Frome Town F.C.

Frome Town play their games at Badgers Hill, Berkley Road, Frome, BA11 2EH.

In 2012, the club added a new 250-seater stand to the stadium, so that their ground would meet the requirements set out for the Southern Football League Premier Division.

The stadium is under ownership of Frome Town Council with a lease to Badgers Hill Ltd. At an extraordinary meeting of Frome Town Council on 10 December 2025, councillors voted to remove the exclusive right of current tenants Badgers Hill Ltd (BHL) to lease or buy the site.

== Honours ==
=== League honours ===
- Southern League Division One South
  - Winners (1): 2025–26
- Western League Premier Division:
  - Winners (1): 1978–79
  - Runners-up (2): 1982–83, 2008–09
- Western League Division One:
  - Winners (1): 2001–02
- Western League Division Two:
  - Winners (1): 1919–20
  - Runners-up (1): 1954–55
- Wiltshire Football League Premier Division:
  - Winners (2): 1909–10, 1962–63
- Somerset County Football League Premier Division:
  - Winners (3): 1906–07, 1908–09, 1910–11

=== Cup honours ===
- Somerset Premier Cup:
  - Winners (5): 1966–67, 1968–69 (Joint), 1982–83, 2008–09, 2025–26
- Somerset Senior Cup:
  - Winners (3): 1932–33, 1933–34, 1950–51
- Southern Football League Cup:
  - Runners up (1): 2012–13
- Western Football League Cup:
  - Winners (2): 1979–80, 1982–83
  - Runners-up (3): 1954–55, 1974-75, 2001–02
- Western League Alan Young Cup:
  - Winners (1): 1979–80
- Western Countied Floodlit Cup:
  - Winners (1): 1983–84

== Records ==
- Highest League Position: 8th in Southern League premier Division 2016–17
- FA Cup best performance: First round 1954–55
- FA Trophy best performance: Third round 2023–24
- FA Vase best performance: Quarter-Final 2004–05
- Highest Attendance: 8,000 vs Leyton Orient 1954–55 Season
