= Paulton Rovers F.C. =

Association football club in England

Coordinates: 51°18′09″N 2°29′44″W

Paulton Rovers
- Full name: Paulton Rovers Football Club
- Nickname: The Rovers
- Founded: 1881
- Ground: First 4 Pools Stadium, Winterfield Road, Paulton
- Capacity: 2,500 (253 seated)
- Chairman: David Bissex
- Manager: Martin Lenihan and Jack Dancey (caretaker)
- League: Southern League Division One South
- 2025–26: Western League Premier Division, 3rd of 18 (promoted via play-offs)
Home colours	Away colours

Paulton Rovers Football Club is an English football club based on Winterfield Road in the growing village of Paulton near Bristol. They were established in 1881 and currently play in the Western League Premier Division One West, the eighth tier of English Football. The club is affiliated to the Somerset County FA.

== History ==
Paulton Rovers first played competitive football in the Western Football League, which they joined in 1900, stayed until 1904, left and rejoined in 1905, stayed until 1924, then from 1925 to 1926 and joined again in 1929.

After World War II, Rovers were placed in the top division of what was now a two-division league but were relegated to Division Two in 1953. In 1960 Division Two was scrapped and for the next fourteen years the team played in the Somerset County Football League, but they eventually rejoined the Western League in 1974. When the league expanded back to two divisions in 1976 they were placed in the Premier Division but were relegated in 1981, only to bounce back three years later. A series of strong finishes in the late 1990s and early 2000s eventually saw them promoted to the Southern League in 2004 in the Division One South and West. After finishing fourth in 2013/14 they won a play off semi final at Tiverton Town 3–1 and then surprised Merthyr Town in front of a 2,201 crowd who had been unbeaten on their own ground in the league by winning 2–0 and gaining promotion to the Southern League Premier Division.

Paulton Rovers had reached the Division One South and West play-off semi-finals in 2006–07 losing 1–4 at home to Taunton Town and in 2012–13 losing 4–2 after extra time to Hungerford Town.

Having defeated Chippenham Town 3–0 at home in the 4th qualifying round of the 2009–10 FA Cup, Paulton were drawn at home against League One team Norwich City, which was televised on ITV1, making it Paulton's first live televised football match. They lost the match 7–0. The official match attendance was 2,070.

Their most successful manager to that date, Andy Jones resigned in February 2011 and assistant manager Paul Milsom and former captain and 1st team coach Mark Harrington took over as joint managers. Harrington took over a manager in June 2011 with Milsom as his assistant.

When Milsom resigned for personal reasons on 8 December 2011 former Rovers centre half Nick Bunyard replaced him. At the beginning of the 2012–13 season Harrington stepped down with Bunyard taking over the reins and Milsom returned as assistant manager.

== Stadium ==
Paulton Rovers play their home games at The Athletic Stadium, Winterfield Road, Paulton, Bristol, BS39 7RF where they have played for over 50 years. Previous grounds include Chapel Field, the Cricket Ground, and the Recreation Ground.

The ground as it is now began to take shape in 1967, when the club bought an old RAF hut and re-erected it on the ground. Plans were drawn up to obtain a mortgage to fund the building of bigger premises, which included a skittle alley. To achieve this necessitated rotating the pitch through 90 degrees to its present position and relocating the clubhouse.

A new changing room block was built in 1972 and the clubhouse has been extended several times to include two large function rooms as well as a substantial bar area. In 2004 a second stand was and terracing covered on two sides, along with training facilities which include a floodlit court and two mini soccer pitches for youth football.

== Colours ==
The club originally wore blue and white shirts. It has worn maroon and white since at least the Second World War.

== Club honours ==
=== Cup honours ===
- Somerset Premier Cup
  - Winners (1): 2012–13
- Somerset Senior Cup
  - Winners (12): 1900–01, 1902–03, 1903–04, 1907–08, 1908–09, 1909–10, 1934–35, 1967–68, 1968–69, 1971–72, 1972–73, 1974–75
- Somerset Junior Cup:
  - Winners: 1898–99
- Western Football League Amateur Trophy:
  - Winners (1): 1974–75

== Club records ==
- Best league performance: 10th in Southern League Premier Division, 2014–15
- Best FA Cup performance: 1st round proper, 2009–10
- Best FA Trophy performance: 1st round proper, 2004–05
- Best FA Vase performance: 5th round, 1989–90
