= Welton Rovers F.C. =

Association football club in England

Coordinates: 51°17′22″N 2°28′52″W

- Full name: Welton Rovers Football Club
- Nicknames: Green Army, Rovers
- Founded: 1887
- Ground: West Clewes, Midsomer Norton
- Capacity: 2,400 (100 seated)
- Chairman: Ryan Grubb
- Manager: Matt Williamson
- League: Western League Division One
- 2025–26: Western League Division One, 16th of 20
Home colours	Away colours

Welton Rovers Football Club is an English, Somerset County FA non-league football club in the Western Football League Premier Division. They are currently members of the Western League Division One and play at West Clewes. Founded in 1887, Welton Rovers provided the opportunity for the mining community of Midsomer Norton and Radstock to play and watch football. One of a number of long-established clubs in the North Somerset coalfield, their ground is the oldest in the area.

== History timeline ==
1903–1904: Welton Rovers joined the Western League.

1906–1907: The Somerset Junior Cup was won for the first time, sharing it with fellow finalists Camerton after a replay.

1911–1912: The league title was won for the first time; only losing 2 games and finishing 4 points ahead of Barry District. The Somerset Senior Cup was also won.

1912–1913: Won the Somerset Senior Cup.

1913–1914: Won the Somerset Senior Cup.

1919–1920: Welton Rovers won their 5th Somerset Senior Cup.

1922–1923: Finished as runners up to Weymouth by 2 points. Troubled times lead to the ground at West Clewes being sold to the Miners Welfare, the generosity of local miners’ contributions enabled the club to stay in existence.

1924–1925: Rejoined the Western League and won the Somerset Senior Cup.

1925–1926: Won the Somerset Senior Cup.

1925–1929: Achieved high league placings without adding another championship.

1939: The 150 seat grandstand at West Clewes was built.

1945–1946: Finished bottom of the single division league.

1946–1947: A season notable for the bad weather; with only 2/31 clubs in the League who completed their fixtures. Welton, in Division One, completed only 20/34 games and were relegated.

1959–1960: Finished as champions, 4 points ahead of Stonehouse.

1960–1961: Won the Somerset Senior Cup.

1961–1962: Won the Somerset Senior Cup and played all their home games at nearby Radstock Town pitch whilst West Clewes pitch was levelled.

1962–1963: Won the Somerset Senior Cup.

1964: The arrival of new manager; former Huddersfield Town and Bristol City striker, Arnold Rodgers.

1964–1965: Reached the 1st round proper of the FA Cup, but lost to Weymouth after a replay. The team won the championship 3 points ahead of Bideford.

1965–1966: Unbeaten for the entire league season, Welton Rovers finished 11 points clear of Portland United and won the championship for the second year running. Player, Ian Henderson, scored a club record of 53 goals that season, including six hat-tricks. On 11 September 1965 Welton won 10–0 at Dorchester Town.

1966–1967: Welton Rovers won the championship for the third consecutive time, finishing 5 points ahead of Minehead.

1967–1968: Welton again reached the first round proper of the FA Cup, but lost 3–0 at Bournemouth & Boscombe Athletic.

1971: With the decline of the local coal industry, the Miners Welfare donated the ground to the local authority for continued use for football. Since then, Welton Rovers have leased West Clewes from the local council. At this time, Manager Arnold Rodgers departed to Bath City and ten players followed him.

1973–1974: After a number of mid table finishes; Manager and former Bristol Rovers player David Stone, won their fifth championship by a single point from Taunton Town.

1981–1982: A long period of decline followed for the team which culminated in its relegation at the end of the season.

1987–1988: Returned to the First Division championship by Manager Steve Coles finishing a single point ahead of Chard Town.

1991–1992: Premier Division status lost at the end of season.

1999–2000: Returned to the Premier Division by manager Adrian Britton, finishing as runners up to unbeaten Devizes Town.

2000–2005: Maintained Premier Division status with new manager Chris Mountford.

2005–2006: The most successful season since the 1970s, ending with a 4th-place finish.

2007: Part of the main stand was damaged by fire in June.

2008: Chris Mountford left the club and was replaced by a new managerial team at the helm of Welton Rovers: Mark Harrington (ex-Bath City and Paulton Rovers) and assistant Graham Colbourne. After rebuilding the squad with the addition of 11 new players Welton finished the season 8th in the league table while reaching the semi-finals of two cup competitions.

2009–2010: Harrington made wholesale changes to the first-team squad with: Gary Banks, Lee Bryant, Timmy Thompson, Danny Maye and Ollie Edwards for Welton's push for improvement. The season saw the first team compete in the top 3 for a large proportion of the season when injuries and suspensions took their toll in early March resulting in a 5th-place finish in the league. In the Les Philips League Cup Welton lost 1–0 to an extra time goal in the semi-finals to the eventual winners Hallen. The pinnacle of the season saw Welton win the Somerset Premier Cup for the first time in club history, overcoming Paulton Rovers, Chard Town, Wellington and Yeovil Town on the way to beating Bridgwater Town in the final. The final, at Yeovil Town's Huish Park on Tuesday 4 May 2010, saw the team win 4–2 on penalties after a goalless 90 minutes and extra time.

2010–2011: Manager Mark Harrington handed in his resignation as first team coach and Mark Leaney was appointed at short notice. Leaney's squad struggled in the Premier Division before he left the club and handed over to Nick Beaverstock. Unfortunately Welton's fate was sealed and relegation followed.

2011–2012: Beaverstock completed one season in the First Division taking the club up to seventh position, but due to work commitments he could not continue. Former Manager, Stuart Minall, continued in his place for the rest of the season.

2012–2013: A hard season with Welton finishing sixteenth.

2014–2015: The club regains Premier Division status.

2019–2020 Stuart James makes his debut and Rovers claim a scintillating 4–0 win over Cheddar.

2020–2021 Tom Smith starts his first season in charge with the best start to a Welton Rovers first team campaign for half a decade

2021–2022 Rovers win promotion to the Western League Premier Division via the playoffs.

== Current squad ==
Note: Flags indicate national team as defined under FIFA eligibility rules; some limited exceptions apply. Players may hold more than one non-FIFA nationality.

No.	Pos.	Nation	Player
1	GK	ENG	Alfie Hamblin
2	DF	ENG	Max Dyer
3	DF	ENG	Caleb Summerfield
4	DF	ENG	Joe Paradise
5	DF	ENG	Jacob Shore
6	DF	ENG	Lewis Ewins
7	MF	ENG	Ben Gundle
8	MF	ENG	Lenny Gale
9	FW	ENG	Brandon Oputeri
10	FW	ENG	joe cattermole
11	FW	ENG	Lee Hicks

No.	Pos.	Nation	Player
12	MF	ENG	Mason Alden
13	GK	ENG	Cameron Pike
14	MF	ENG	Chris Pile
15	MF	ENG	Harry Banks
16	DF	ENG	Miguel Alves

== Honours ==
- Western League
  - Champions 1911–12, 1964–65, 1965–66, 1966–67, 1973–74
- Western League Division One
  - Champions 1959–60, 1987–88
  - Runners-up 2014–15
- Somerset Premier Cup
  - Winners – 2009–10
  - Runners-up – 1965–66
- Somerset Senior Cup
  - Winners – 1906–07, 1911–12, 1912–13, 1913–14, 1919–20, 1924–25, 1925–26, 1960–61, 1961–62, 1962–63
  - Runners-up (1): 1926–27
- Somerset Intermediate Cup
  - Winners 1977–78
- Somerset Junior Cup
  - Winners – 1906–07
- Somerset Senior League Division One
  - Champions 1999-00 (reserves)
- Western Football League Alan Young Cup:
  - Winners (2): 1965–66, 1966–67
- Western Football League Amateur Trophy:
  - Winners (4): 1956–57, 1957–58, 1958–59, 1959–60
