= 2023–24 Western Football League =

Western Football League
- Season: 2023–24
- Champions: Helston Athletic
- Promoted: Helston Athletic; Falmouth Town

The 2023–24 Western Football League season (known as the 2023–24 Toolstation Western Football League for sponsorship reasons) was the 122nd in the history of the Western Football League, a football competition in England. Teams are divided into two divisions; the Premier and the First.

The constitution was announced on 15 May 2023. Starting this season, the Premier Division (step 5) promotes two clubs; one as champions and one via a four-team play-off. This replaced the previous inter-step play-off system. For this season only, there was only one club relegated from the Premier Division.

== Premier Division ==
The Premier Division was reduced to 18 clubs from 20 after Mousehole were promoted to the Southern League South Division; Sherborne Town were transferred to the Wessex League; Cadbury Heath took voluntary demotion to Division One, Keynsham Town were relegated to Division One, and Ashton & Backwell United and Bitton resigned from the league.

Mangotsfield United were initially transferred from the Hellenic League Premier Division, but were moved back after the resignation of Shrivenham from that league.

Four new clubs joined the division.

- Promoted from Division One:
  - Nailsea & Tickenham
  - Oldland Abbotonians
- Promoted from the South West Peninsula League Premier Division East:
  - Brixham
- Promoted from the South West Peninsula League Premier Division West:
  - St Blazey

=== League table ===
Pos	Team	Pld	W	D	L	GF	GA	GD	Pts	Promotion, qualification or relegation
1	Helston Athletic (C, P)	34	25	5	4	104	30	+74	80	Promoted to the Southern League
2	Falmouth Town (O, P)	34	24	4	6	80	25	+55	76	Promoted to the Southern League
3	Bridgwater United	34	23	3	8	99	48	+51	72	Qualification for the play-offs
4	Clevedon Town	34	21	7	6	70	26	+44	70	Qualification for the play-offs
5	Barnstaple Town	34	19	10	5	84	44	+40	67	Qualification for the play-offs
6	Buckland Athletic	34	18	7	9	88	53	+35	61	
7	Shepton Mallet	34	18	6	10	63	46	+17	60	
8	Brixham	33	14	10	9	69	36	+33	55 (Note: Brixham were awarded three points)	
9	Nailsea & Tickenham	34	14	4	16	68	63	+5	46	
10	Torpoint Athletic	34	13	6	15	51	59	−8	45	
11	Ilfracombe Town	34	10	10	14	56	65	−9	40	
12	St Blazey	34	11	6	17	55	68	−13	39	
13	Saltash United	34	10	6	18	55	64	−9	36	
14	Street	34	9	7	18	53	75	−22	34	
15	Wellington	34	8	8	18	43	81	−38	32	
16	Oldland Abbotonians	34	7	2	25	44	92	−48	23	
17	Welton Rovers	34	4	8	22	37	100	−63	17 (Note: Welton Rovers had three points deducted)	
18	Millbrook (R)	33	2	1	30	17	161	−144	7	Relegated to South West Peninsula League Division One West

Updated to match(es) played on 16:23, 6 May 2024 (UTC). Source: Toolstation Western League.
Rules for classification: 1) points; 2) goal difference; 3) number of goals scored.
(C) Champions; (O) Play-off winners; (P) Promoted; (R) Relegated

=== Promotion playoffs ===
Semi-finals
2	Falmouth Town	3
5	Barnstaple Town	1
3	Bridgwater United	0
4	Clevedon Town	1

Final
2	Falmouth Town	2
4	Clevedon Town	0

==== Semifinals ====
30 April	Falmouth Town	3–1	Barnstaple Town	Falmouth
19:45	Brabyn, Massey, Wilson	Report	Montague	Stadium: Bickland Park; Attendance: 480

30 April	Bridgwater United	0–1	Clevedon Town	Bridgwater
19:45		Report	Teall 79'	Stadium: Fairfax Park; Attendance: 472

==== Final ====
4 May	Falmouth Town	2–0	Clevedon Town	Falmouth
15:00	Massey 2', Barner 70'	Report		Stadium: Bickland Park; Attendance: 973

=== Stadia and locations ===
Location of the clubs in the 2023–24 Western League Premier Division
Location of the clubs in the 2023–24 Western League Premier Division (Somerset)

Club	Location	Stadium	Capacity
Barnstaple Town	Barnstaple	Mill Road	5,000
Bridgwater United	Bridgwater	Fairfax Park	2,500
Brixham	Brixham	Wall Park Road	2,000
Buckland Athletic	Newton Abbot	Homers Heath	1,000
Clevedon Town	Clevedon	North Somerset Community Stadium	3,900
Falmouth Town	Falmouth	Bickland Park	3,572
Helston Athletic	Helston	Kellaway Park	1,300
Ilfracombe Town	Ilfracombe	Marlborough Park	2,000
Millbrook	Millbrook	Jenkins Park	1,000
Nailsea & Tickenham	Nailsea	Fryth Way	1,000
Oldland Abbotonians	Oldland Common	Aitchison Playing Field	1,000
Saltash United	Saltash	Kimberley Stadium	1,000
Shepton Mallet	Shepton Mallet	Old Wells Road	2,500
St Blazey	St Blazey	Blaise Park	3,500
Street	Street	The Tannery Ground	1,000
Torpoint Athletic	Torpoint	The Mill	1,000
Wellington	Wellington	Wellington Playing Field	1,000
Welton Rovers	Midsomer Norton	West Clewes Recreation Ground	2,400

== First Division ==
The First Division remained at 22 clubs after Nailsea & Tickenham and Oldland Abbotonians were promoted to the Premier Division; Bishops Lydeard were transferred to the South West Peninsula League Premier Division East, FC Bristol and Tytherington Rocks were transferred to the Hellenic League Division One, and Almondsbury were relegated.

Six new clubs joined:

- From the Premier Division:
  - Bitton (resigned mid-season and applied to join Division One this season)
  - Cadbury Heath (voluntary demotion)
  - Keynsham Town (relegation)
- Relegated from the Hellenic League Premier Division:
  - Bradford Town
- Promoted from the Gloucestershire County League:
  - Cribbs Reserves
- Promoted from the Somerset County League:
  - Middlezoy Rovers
- Reserve and development teams were not eligible for promotion to step 5, or the playoffs. Bitton were also ineligible, due to their resignation from the Premier Division last season.
- Wincanton Town were promoted on a PPG (points per game) basis despite losing the play-off final.

=== League table ===
Pos	Team	Pld	W	D	L	GF	GA	GD	Pts	Promotion, qualification or relegation
1	Portishead Town (C, P)	42	31	6	5	122	29	+93	99	Promoted to the Premier Division
2	Radstock Town	42	28	7	7	100	45	+55	91	Qualification for the play-offs
3	Bitton	42	27	8	7	100	49	+51	89	
4	Wincanton Town (P)	42	27	4	11	103	75	+28	85	Promoted (PPG) and transferred to the Wessex League Premier Division
5	Wells City	42	27	3	12	100	59	+41	84	Qualification for the play-offs
6	Cribbs Reserves	42	27	5	10	105	60	+45	83 (Note: Cribbs Reserves had three points deducted)	
7	Brislington (O, P)	42	25	5	12	125	54	+71	80	Promoted to the Premier Division
8	Bradford Town	42	19	11	12	87	62	+25	68	
9	Hallen	42	20	8	14	82	66	+16	68	
10	AEK Boco	42	19	8	15	71	54	+17	65	
11	Bristol Telephones	42	19	6	17	71	83	−12	63	
12	Longwell Green Sports	42	18	5	19	85	88	−3	59	
13	Middlezoy Rovers	42	18	2	22	76	88	−12	56	Transferred to South West Peninsula League Premier Division East
14	Cadbury Heath	42	17	4	21	84	70	+14	55	
15	Hengrove Athletic	42	13	7	22	63	84	−21	46	
16	Odd Down	42	13	7	22	67	108	−41	46	
17	Shirehampton	42	12	7	23	73	86	−13	43	
18	Keynsham Town	42	13	4	25	89	116	−27	43	
19	Warminster Town	42	10	7	25	64	106	−42	37	
20	Gillingham Town	42	10	4	28	58	117	−59	34	Reprieved from relegation
21	Cheddar	42	8	1	33	53	115	−62	25	Reprieved from relegation
22	Bishop Sutton (R)	42	0	3	39	18	182	−164	3	Relegated to the Somerset County League

Updated to match(es) played on 16:57, 4 May 2024 (UTC). Source: Toolstation Western League.
Rules for classification: 1) points; 2) goal difference; 3) number of goals scored.
(C) Champions; (O) Play-off winners; (P) Promoted; (R) Relegated

=== Promotion playoffs ===
Semi-finals
2	Radstock Town	0
7	Brislington	1
4	Wincanton Town	6
5	Wells City	4

Final
4	Wincanton Town	2
7	Brislington	3

==== Semifinals ====
30 April	Radstock Town	0–1	Brislington	Radstock
19:30		Report	Griffiths 78'	Stadium: The Southfields Recreation Ground; Attendance: 365

30 April	Wincanton Town	6–4	Wells City	Wincanton
19:45	Hodges 7', Jarvis 62', 64'; Williams 67', Thompson 76', Townsend 84'	Report	Murray 6', 15', 80' (pen.), Diamond 9'	Stadium: Wincanton Sports Ground; Attendance: 152

==== Final ====
4 May	Wincanton Town	2–3	Brislington	Wincanton
15:00	Thompson 4', Jarvis 25'	Report	Kington 61', McClennan 72', Dunn 90+2'	Stadium: Wincanton Sports Ground; Attendance: 326

=== Stadia and locations ===
Location of the clubs in the 2023–24 Western League Division One
Location of the clubs in the 2023–24 Western League Division One (Bristol)

Club	Location	Stadium	Capacity
AEK Boco	Hanham	Greenbank Recreation Ground	1,000
Bishop Sutton	Bishop Sutton	Lakeview	1,500
Bitton	Bitton	Bath Road	
Bradford Town	Bradford-on-Avon	Trowbridge Road	1,000
Brislington	Bristol	Ironmould Lane	3,000
Bristol Telephones	Whitchurch	BTRA Sports Ground	1,000
Cadbury Heath	Cadbury Heath	Cadbury Heath Road	
Cheddar	Cheddar	Draycott Road	
Cribbs Reserves	Henbury	The Lawns	1,000
Gillingham Town	Gillingham	Woodwater Lane	1,000
Hallen	Hallen	Hallen Centre	2,000
Hengrove Athletic	Whitchurch	Norton Lane	1,000
Keynsham Town	Keynsham	AJN Stadium	3,001
Longwell Green Sports	Longwell Green	Longwell Green Community Centre	1,000
Middlezoy Rovers	Westonzoyland	Ethan Berry Pavilion	1,000
Odd Down	Bath	Lew Hill Memorial Ground	1,000
Portishead Town	Portishead	Bristol Road	1,400
Radstock Town	Radstock	Southfields Recreation Ground	1,250
Shirehampton	Shirehampton	Penpole Lane	1,000
Warminster Town	Warminster	Weymouth Street	1,000
Wells City	Wells	Athletic Ground	1,500
Wincanton Town	Wincanton	Wincanton Sports Ground	1,000

== Les Phillips Cup ==
The 2023–24 Les Phillips Cup was the cup competition of the whole Western Football League.

Helston Athletic were defending champions, having beaten Shepton Mallet in the 2022–23 season.

=== First round ===
16 clubs participated in the first round.

Tie	(Tier) Home team	Score	Away team (Tier)	Att.
1	Cheddar (D1)	2–4	Barnstaple Town (PD)	88
2	Clevedon Town (PD)	0–3	Bridgwater United (PD)	
3	Hengrove Athletic (D1)	5–2	Bishop Sutton (D1)	
4	Hallen (D1)	1–0	Welton Rovers (PD)	
5	Warminster Town (D1)	2–4	Street (PD)	
6	Cadbury Heath (PD)	1–2	Longwell Green Sports (D1)	
7	Brislington (D1)	0–4	AEK Boco (D1)	
8	Cribbs Reserves (D1)	3–0	Bristol Telephones (D1)	

=== Second round ===
The 8 clubs who made it through the first round were joined in the draw by 24 clubs who received a bye to the second round, making 32 clubs.

Tie	(Tier) Home team	Score	Away team (Tier)	Att.
1	Falmouth Town (PD)	0–2	Helston Athletic (PD)	
2	Millbrook (PD)	1–6	Brixham (PD)	
3	Buckland Athletic (PD)	0–0 (4–3 p)	Torpoint Athletic (PD)	
4	St Blazey (PD)	1–5	Saltash United (PD)	
5	Wellington (PD)	2–3	Ilfracombe Town (PD)	
6	Portishead Town (D1)	1–3	Bridgwater United (PD)	
7	Middlezoy Rovers (D1)	1–1 (4–1 p)	Radstock Town (D1)	
8	Nailsea & Tickenham (PD)	0–4	Barnstaple Town (PD)	
9	Bitton (D1)	3–2	Gillingham Town (D1)	
10	Wincanton Town (D1)	6–0	Hallen (D1)	
11	Hengrove Athletic (D1)	1–2	Shepton Mallet (PD)	
12	Wells City (D1)	1–1 (4–3 p)	Street (PD)	
13	Odd Down (D1)	3–1	Longwell Green Sports (D1)	
14	Bradford Town (D1)	2–0	Oldland Abbotonians (PD)	
15	Cribbs Reserves (D1)	0–0 (4–3 p)	AEK Boco (D1)	
16	Keynsham Town (D1)	4–9	Shirehampton (D1)	

=== Third round ===
Tie	(Tier) Home team	Score	Away team (Tier)	Att.
1	Brixham (PD)	1–1 (2–3 p)	Buckland Athletic (PD)	
2	Saltash United (PD)	1–2	Helston Athletic (PD)	
3	Bridgwater United (PD)	1–1 (4–2 p)	Ilfracombe Town (PD)	
4	Middlezoy Rovers (D1)	2–2 (7–8 p)	Barnstaple Town (PD)	
5	Wincanton Town (D1)	0–6	Shepton Mallet (PD)	
6	Bitton (D1)	0–2	Wells City (D1)	
7	Cribbs Reserves (D1)	4–4 (4–2 p)	Odd Down (D1)	
8	Bradford Town (D1)	1–4	Shirehampton (D1)	

=== Quarter-finals ===
Tie	(Tier) Home team	Score	Away team (Tier)	Att.
1	Helston Athletic (PD)	3–2	Buckland Athletic (PD)	
2	Bridgwater United (PD)	1–4	Barnstaple Town (PD)	
3	Shepton Mallet (PD)	2–0	Wells City (D1)	
4	Cribbs Reserves (D1)	3–4	Shirehampton (D1)	57

=== Semi-finals ===
Tie	(Tier) Home team	Score	Away team (Tier)	Att.
1	Barnstaple Town (PD)	3–2	Helston Athletic (PD)	
2	Shepton Mallet (PD)	6–1	Shirehampton (D1)	

=== Final ===
12 May 2024	Shepton Mallet (PD)	3–1	Barnstaple Town (PD)	Ladysmead, Tiverton
15:00
