= 2024–25 Western Football League =

Western Football League
- Season: 2024–25

The 2024–25 Western Football League season (known as the 2024–25 Jewson Western Football League for sponsorship reasons) was the 123rd in the history of the Western Football League, a football competition in England. Teams were divided into two divisions: the Premier and the First.

The constitution was announced on 17 May 2024.

The Premier Division (step 5) promoted two clubs; one as champions and one via a four-team play-off.

== Premier Division ==
The Premier Division was increased from 18 to 20 clubs after Helston Athletic and Falmouth Town were promoted to the Southern League Division One South and Millbrook were relegated to the South West Peninsula League Premier Division West.

Five new clubs joined the division:

- One relegated from the Southern League Division One South:
  - Paulton Rovers
- One promoted from the South West Peninsula League Premier Division East:
  - Ivybridge Town
- One promoted from the South West Peninsula League Premier Division West:
  - A.F.C. St Austell
- Two promoted from Division One
  - Brislington
  - Portishead Town

=== League table ===
Pos	Team	Pld	W	D	L	GF	GA	GD	Pts	Promotion, qualification or relegation
1	Portishead Town (C, P)	38	29	4	5	114	37	+77	91	Promoted to Southern League Division One South
2	Clevedon Town	38	27	5	6	101	33	+68	86	Qualified for the play-offs
3	Brixham (O, P)	38	25	5	8	79	43	+36	80	Qualified for the play-offs
4	Barnstaple Town	38	21	5	12	83	57	+26	68	Qualified for the play-offs
5	Buckland Athletic	38	19	8	11	77	41	+36	65	Qualified for the play-offs
6	Shepton Mallet	38	19	5	14	66	44	+22	62	
7	Nailsea & Tickenham	38	19	5	14	63	49	+14	62	
8	Street	38	18	6	14	62	58	+4	60	
9	Paulton Rovers	38	18	5	15	81	75	+6	59	
10	Oldland Abbotonians	38	16	7	15	56	58	−2	55	
11	A.F.C. St Austell	38	16	4	18	64	67	−3	52	
12	Ivybridge Town	38	14	9	15	57	57	0	51	
13	Wellington	38	16	3	19	48	72	−24	51	
14	Brislington	38	15	5	18	61	62	−1	50	
15	Torpoint Athletic	38	15	3	20	65	67	−2	48	
16	Saltash United	38	14	4	20	67	62	+5	46	
17	Bridgwater United	38	12	6	20	44	66	−22	42	
18	St Blazey	38	7	8	23	41	85	−44	29	
19	Ilfracombe Town (R)	38	7	6	25	35	79	−44	27	Relegated to SWPL Premier Division East
20	Welton Rovers (R)	38	1	1	36	24	176	−152	4	Relegated to the First Division

Source: Western League.
Rules for classification: 1) points; 2) goal difference; 3) number of goals scored.
(C) Champions; (O) Play-off winners; (P) Promoted; (R) Relegated

=== Results table ===
Home \ Away	ASA	BAR	BRW	BRS	BRX	BUC	CLV	ILF	IVY	N&T	OLA	PAU	POR	SAL	SPM	STB	STR	TPA	WLG	WTR
AFC St Austell	—	2–1	1–2	2–1	3–1	3–3	2–5	2–1	2–2	2–0	1–1	1–3	1–3	1–4	1–2	2–0	1–2	5–1	2–0	4–0
Barnstaple Town	4–2	—	4–2	4–0	0–3	2–0	3–4	0–3	1–0	1–0	0–2	2–2	3–0	2–1	0–3	3–0	3–4	3–2	2–1	10–0
Bridgwater United	3–0	1–3	—	1–1	0–0	0–4	0–3	1–0	0–0	0–4	2–3	2–1	1–3	1–2	0–3	0–0	0–1	1–0	1–0	3–1
Brislington	4–1	4–3	1–0	—	1–2	1–3	0–3	2–0	0–2	0–2	2–1	4–4	0–3	1–2	1–2	8–0	3–0	2–1	2–1	6–0
Brixham	2–0	2–3	2–1	2–1	—	2–1	1–2	0–0	5–1	2–0	2–1	2–0	3–2	1–0	3–2	0–0	3–1	4–1	1–2	6–1
Buckland Athletic	2–0	3–4	2–2	2–0	2–0	—	2–2	2–1	2–1	1–1	2–3	7–0	1–2	3–1	0–1	5–1	2–2	1–1	4–0	8–0
Clevedon Town	3–0	2–0	4–0	5–1	2–3	1–0	—	5–0	6–0	0–1	1–1	4–1	1–1	1–0	2–1	4–1	2–2	4–1	3–0	4–0
Ilfracombe Town	0–3	0–4	1–1	2–2	0–0	0–1	0–3	—	0–1	1–2	1–0	1–3	0–3	0–3	1–1	2–2	2–0	0–3	1–2	4–0
Ivybridge Town	2–1	5–2	0–2	1–1	1–2	0–0	0–3	2–1	—	1–2	1–1	2–1	3–0	1–1	0–1	1–1	0–2	4–1	1–1	10–0
Nailsea & Tickenham	0–3	1–2	3–1	1–1	2–0	2–3	1–5	3–0	2–0	—	0–1	0–0	2–2	1–2	2–3	4–2	2–1	2–1	3–0	7–1
Oldland Abbotonians	1–1	1–6	1–0	1–0	2–4	1–0	0–1	2–0	3–0	4–0	—	2–1	0–1	1–2	2–1	1–1	1–1	3–2	3–4	3–1
Paulton Rovers	4–2	0–2	7–2	4–0	3–2	1–0	2–2	5–0	0–2	3–2	4–2	—	5–2	3–1	3–2	2–1	0–1	0–5	4–2	5–1
Portishead Town	3–1	0–0	2–1	1–0	6–2	3–0	2–0	3–0	8–0	0–1	4–1	4–0	—	4–3	2–0	4–1	6–2	5–1	6–1	6–0
Saltash United	1–2	0–3	5–0	1–3	1–1	0–1	0–2	1–4	0–1	0–2	3–1	2–1	1–4	—	1–1	3–0	2–3	2–0	0–2	12–1
Shepton Mallet	1–2	1–0	1–0	2–0	0–2	0–1	3–0	5–2	1–1	0–2	1–3	1–2	1–1	2–0	—	4–0	1–2	2–0	5–1	1–0
St Blazey	2–4	0–0	0–2	0–1	1–2	1–0	1–0	4–1	0–2	0–2	1–1	1–1	1–3	4–1	3–2	—	2–3	1–0	1–3	3–1
Street	2–1	1–1	0–1	0–2	0–2	1–1	0–1	2–0	2–1	1–0	3–0	3–1	0–2	1–3	0–1	2–1	—	2–1	2–2	3–0
Torpoint Athletic	1–0	4–0	2–1	3–0	0–3	0–3	3–2	1–2	0–3	1–1	2–0	3–2	0–2	2–1	2–2	2–0	3–1	—	2–3	8–0
Wellington	0–1	0–1	1–4	0–1	0–4	0–1	0–4	3–1	2–0	2–0	1–0	2–1	0–4	1–1	2–1	2–0	3–2	0–2	—	3–1
Welton Rovers	0–2	1–1	0–5	0–4	0–3	1–4	0–5	2–3	0–5	2–3	1–2	1–2	0–7	0–4	0–5	7–4	1–7	0–3	0–1	—

Source: Western League
Legend: Blue = home team win; Yellow = draw; Red = away team win.
For upcoming matches, an "a" indicates there is an article about the rivalry between the two participants.

=== Promotion playoffs ===
Semi-finals
2	Clevedon Town	3
5	Buckland Athletic	1
3	Brixham	3
4	Barnstaple Town	0

Final
2	Clevedon Town	1
3	Brixham	2

==== Semifinals ====
29 April 2025	Brixham	3–0	Barnstaple Town	Brixham
19:30 GMT	Robinson 21'; Moxon 23'; Parkin 66'	Report		Stadium: Wall Park; Attendance: 346

29 April 2025	Clevedon Town	3–1	Buckland Athletic	Kenn
19:30 GMT	Camm 8', 12'; Hayer 83'	Report	Bush 52'	Stadium: Hand Stadium; Attendance: 395

==== Final ====
3 May 2025	Clevedon Town	1–2	Brixham	Kenn
15:00 GMT	Beresford 30'	Report	Moxon 67', 89'	Stadium: Hand Stadium; Attendance: 464

=== Stadia and locations ===
Location of the clubs in the 2024–25 Western League Premier Division
Location of the clubs in the 2024–25 Western League Premier Division (Somerset)

Club	Location	Stadium	Capacity
AFC St Austell	St Austell	Poltair Park	6,000
Barnstaple Town	Barnstaple	Mill Road	5,000
Bridgwater United	Bridgwater	Fairfax Park	2,500
Brislington	Bristol	Ironmould Lane	3,000
Brixham	Brixham	Wall Park Road	2,000
Buckland Athletic	Newton Abbot	Homers Heath	1,000
Clevedon Town	Clevedon	North Somerset Community Stadium	3,900
Ilfracombe Town	Ilfracombe	Marlborough Park	2,000
Ivybridge Town	Ivybridge	Erme Valley	2,000
Nailsea & Tickenham	Nailsea	Fryth Way	1,000
Oldland Abbotonians	Oldland Common	Aitchison Playing Field	1,000
Paulton Rovers	Paulton	Winterfield Stadium	2,500
Portishead Town	Portishead	Bristol Road	1,400
Saltash United	Saltash	Kimberley Stadium	1,000
Shepton Mallet	Shepton Mallet	Old Wells Road	2,500
St Blazey	St Blazey	Blaise Park	3,500
Street	Street	The Tannery Ground	1,000
Torpoint Athletic	Torpoint	The Mill	1,000
Wellington	Wellington	Wellington Playing Field	1,000
Welton Rovers	Midsomer Norton	West Clewes Recreation Ground	2,400

== First Division ==
The First Division remained at 22 clubs after Portishead Town and Brislington were promoted to the Premier Division; Wincanton Town were promoted to the Wessex League Premier Division; Middlezoy Rovers were transferred to the South West Peninsula League Premier Division East, and Bishop Sutton were relegated.

Five new clubs joined the division:

- Two transferred from the Hellenic League Division One:
  - Calne Town
  - Devizes Town
- One promoted from the Dorset Premier League:
  - Sturminster Newton United
- One promoted from the Gloucestershire County League:
  - Avonmouth
- One promoted from the Somerset County League:
  - Mendip Broadwalk

=== League table ===
Pos	Team	Pld	W	D	L	GF	GA	GD	Pts	Promotion, qualification or relegation
1	Hallen (C, P)	42	31	6	5	103	29	+74	99	Promoted to the Hellenic League Premier Division
2	Calne Town	42	27	5	10	100	48	+52	86	Qualified for the play-offs
3	Devizes Town	42	25	9	8	95	35	+60	84	Qualified for the play-offs
4	Bradford Town (O, P)	42	25	8	9	92	47	+45	83	Qualified for the play-offs
5	Wells City	42	25	7	10	90	41	+49	82	Qualified for the play-offs
6	Longwell Green Sports	42	25	7	10	104	63	+41	82	
7	Bitton	42	25	6	11	79	59	+20	77 (Note: Bitton had four points deducted)	
8	Sturminster Newton United	42	23	7	12	74	57	+17	76	
9	Bristol Telephones	42	17	13	12	96	66	+30	64	
10	Mendip Broadwalk	42	18	10	14	79	77	+2	64	
11	Shirehampton	42	18	8	16	66	64	+2	62	
12	Cribbs Reserves	42	17	9	16	79	73	+6	60	Demoted to a feeder league (Note: Cribbs Reserves were demoted after Cribbs' first team were relegated from the Southern League. The FA stipulate there must be two levels between a club's first team and its reserves.)
13	Cadbury Heath	42	17	7	18	69	74	−5	58	
14	AEK Boco	42	15	8	19	64	69	−5	53	
15	Avonmouth	42	15	7	20	80	84	−4	52	
16	Radstock Town	42	12	5	25	60	89	−29	41	
17	Odd Down	42	10	9	23	56	94	−38	39	
18	Hengrove Athletic	42	9	11	22	51	70	−19	38	
19	Cheddar	42	9	7	26	39	83	−44	33 (Note: Cheddar had one point deducted)	
20	Warminster Town	42	7	10	25	46	101	−55	31	Reprieved from relegation
21	Keynsham Town	42	5	8	29	44	131	−87	23	Reprieved from relegation
22	Gillingham Town (R)	42	1	5	36	29	141	−112	8	Relegated to the Dorset Premier League

Source: Western League.
Rules for classification: 1) points; 2) goal difference; 3) number of goals scored.
(C) Champions; (O) Play-off winners; (P) Promoted; (R) Relegated

=== Results table ===
Home \ Away	AEK	AVO	BIT	BRA	BTP	CBH	CAL	CHE	CRI	DEV	GIL	HAL	HGA	KEY	LGS	MDB	ODD	RAD	SHI	SNU	WAR	WLS
AEK Boco	—	2–0	0–3	2–1	1–1	3–0	1–1	2–1	2–1	0–2	2–1	0–2	1–1	1–1	2–3	4–1	3–1	3–0	1–0	0–1	4–2	1–4
Avonmouth	2–0	—	1–2	2–3	3–3	1–1	3–5	3–1	0–2	0–3	2–2	1–2	2–1	7–3	0–3	0–4	0–2	4–2	2–2	1–2	5–1	4–1
Bitton	3–2	2–1	—	1–1	4–1	2–2	1–4	5–1	0–0	1–3	3–0	0–1	3–1	2–1	2–1	1–2	4–0	1–0	1–4	0–3	4–0	2–1
Bradford Town	1–1	4–0	0–2	—	2–0	2–1	2–1	4–0	2–2	1–0	4–0	1–0	1–3	1–1	0–0	5–0	2–1	2–0	1–2	5–1	2–1	1–4
Bristol Telephones	4–1	3–0	0–3	1–2	—	1–2	2–3	2–0	1–2	0–0	5–0	0–1	1–1	7–2	4–4	4–4	4–2	5–0	1–1	1–2	4–2	2–0
Cadbury Heath	1–0	3–0	0–2	3–1	1–2	—	3–5	1–0	0–3	1–4	3–0	0–2	2–0	3–0	1–7	1–1	6–4	2–1	2–3	1–2	3–1	2–4
Calne Town	1–2	6–1	4–0	1–1	0–3	0–3	—	1–0	4–7	2–0	5–0	2–0	1–0	4–0	4–0	3–0	2–0	0–2	2–0	1–0	6–0	3–0
Cheddar	3–1	3–2	0–1	1–0	1–7	0–1	0–4	—	1–1	0–4	1–1	0–2	2–2	2–3	1–1	0–1	2–0	0–0	1–1	0–2	2–1	0–2
Cribbs reserves	1–1	1–2	4–1	1–2	4–5	2–3	1–2	3–1	—	0–0	3–1	0–2	3–0	4–2	0–2	4–3	3–3	0–5	0–2	0–2	2–0	0–2
Devizes Town	1–1	2–0	2–0	2–2	0–1	1–0	2–1	6–0	1–1	—	3–1	1–2	1–0	2–2	6–1	7–0	2–2	4–2	1–2	3–0	8–0	0–1
Gillingham Town	1–4	1–5	2–6	1–3	1–1	0–3	1–3	1–2	1–4	0–2	—	1–6	1–6	0–1	0–3	3–4	1–1	1–2	1–1	1–3	2–1	2–6
Hallen	6–1	2–0	6–1	3–2	2–2	4–1	2–0	1–0	0–2	0–0	2–0	—	1–0	8–0	2–2	3–1	5–0	0–1	4–1	2–2	2–0	1–0
Hengrove Athletic	3–1	1–1	1–1	0–2	1–1	0–0	2–3	0–4	2–5	0–2	3–0	2–0	—	3–2	0–3	4–1	0–1	2–3	2–0	1–2	3–2	0–0
Keynsham Town	2–1	0–3	1–2	0–8	0–5	2–6	1–1	0–2	1–2	1–4	6–0	0–3	0–0	—	0–6	0–6	1–2	1–4	0–1	2–3	2–2	1–1
Longwell Green Sports	2–0	2–8	5–0	1–2	1–3	2–1	2–1	4–0	1–2	2–0	7–0	3–3	2–1	2–0	—	2–4	2–0	2–1	4–3	3–2	2–0	1–1
Mendip Broadwalk	0–0	0–3	1–1	3–3	2–1	3–3	1–1	2–0	2–1	0–3	4–0	0–2	2–1	3–0	1–0	—	2–2	2–0	1–1	1–3	5–1	2–0
Odd Down	3–5	1–1	0–2	0–4	1–1	3–0	1–3	2–1	2–2	0–3	2–0	0–4	1–0	1–1	2–4	2–1	—	2–1	2–3	1–2	2–0	0–4
Radstock Town	0–4	3–4	1–3	0–3	2–2	0–0	0–5	2–1	4–2	2–3	5–1	1–6	1–1	1–2	2–5	3–2	2–0	—	1–2	1–2	4–1	0–3
Shirehampton	3–2	0–1	0–1	0–2	4–1	0–1	1–2	3–1	0–2	0–3	2–0	0–3	3–1	6–1	0–1	1–2	2–1	2–1	—	3–2	1–1	2–2
Sturminster Newton United	1–0	2–0	1–2	0–2	2–1	5–2	1–2	1–1	0–0	4–1	2–0	1–5	3–0	4–1	1–1	2–1	3–3	0–0	1–1	—	2–1	0–1
Warminster Town	3–2	0–4	1–1	0–2	1–1	0–0	1–1	1–3	3–2	2–2	4–0	0–0	1–1	1–0	1–4	1–3	3–2	2–0	0–2	3–2	—	1–1
Wells City	1–0	1–1	0–3	5–3	1–2	1–0	1–0	2–0	5–0	0–1	6–0	0–1	4–1	7–0	2–1	1–1	3–1	2–0	5–1	2–0	3–0	—

Source: Western League
Legend: Blue = home team win; Yellow = draw; Red = away team win.
For upcoming matches, an "a" indicates there is an article about the rivalry between the two participants.

=== Promotion playoffs ===
Semi-finals
2	Calne Town	1
5	Wells City	0
3	Devizes Town	1 (3)
4	Bradford Town	1 (4)

Final
2	Calne Town	0
4	Bradford Town	5

==== Semifinals ====
29 April 2025	Calne Town	1–0	Wells City	Calne
19:45 GMT	Stewart 2'	Report		Stadium: Bremhill View

29 April 2025	Devizes Town	1–1 (3–4 p)	Bradford Town	Devizes
19:30 GMT	Baker	Report	D. Demkiv 57'	Stadium: Nursteed Road

==== Final ====
3 May 2025	Calne Town	0–5	Bradford Town	Calne
15:00 GMT		Report	Pearce 21'; D. Demkiv 37'; C. Demkiv 74'; Jordan 81'; Oppong 86'	Stadium: Bremhill View; Attendance: 532

=== Stadia and locations ===
Location of the clubs in the 2024–25 Western League Division One
Location of the clubs in the 2024–25 Western League Division One (Bristol)
Location of the clubs in the 2024–25 Western League Division One (Wiltshire)

Club	Location	Stadium	Capacity
AEK Boco	Hanham	Greenbank Recreation Ground	1,000
Avonmouth	Avonmouth	King George V Recreation Ground	
Bitton	Bitton	Bath Road	
Bradford Town	Bradford-on-Avon	Trowbridge Road	1,000
Bristol Telephones	Whitchurch	BTRA Sports Ground	1,000
Cadbury Heath	Cadbury Heath	Cadbury Heath Road	
Calne Town	Calne	Bremhill View	2,500
Cheddar	Cheddar	Draycott Road	
Cribbs Reserves	Henbury	The Lawns	1,000
Devizes Town	Devizes	Nursteed Road	2,500
Gillingham Town	Gillingham	Woodwater Lane	1,000
Hallen	Hallen	Hallen Centre	2,000
Hengrove Athletic	Whitchurch	Norton Lane	1,000
Keynsham Town	Keynsham	AJN Stadium	3,001
Longwell Green Sports	Longwell Green	Longwell Green Community Centre	1,000
Mendip Broadwalk	Bristol	Filwood Park Playing Fields	1,000
Odd Down	Bath	Lew Hill Memorial Ground	1,000
Radstock Town	Radstock	Southfields Recreation Ground	1,250
Shirehampton	Shirehampton	Penpole Lane	1,000
Sturminster Newton United	Sturminster Newton	Barnets Field	1,000
Warminster Town	Warminster	Weymouth Street	1,000
Wells City	Wells	Athletic Ground	1,500
