= 2022–23 Western Football League =

Western Football League
- Season: 2022–23

The 2022–23 Western Football League season (known as the 2022–23 Toolstation Western Football League for sponsorship reasons) was the 121st in the history of the Western Football League, a football competition in England. Teams were divided into two divisions; the Premier and the First.

The constitution was announced on 12 May 2022.

With a view to a merger between the Western League and the South West Peninsula League in 2023–24, four clubs were to be automatically promoted from Division One to Step 5, depending on ground grading. The fifth-placed club may also have been promoted, on a PPG (points per game) basis. However, the FA scrapped the merger in February 2023 after a breakdown in negotiations, and promotion was reverted to two clubs, one via a play-off.

== Premier Division ==
The Premier Division was increased to 20 clubs from 19 after Exmouth Town and Tavistock were promoted to the Southern League South Division, and Bridport were relegated to the South West Peninsula League Premier Division East. Brislington requested demotion to Division One, which the league accepted.

Five new clubs joined the division.

- Promoted from Division One:
  - Sherborne Town
  - Welton Rovers
- Promoted from the South West Peninsula League Premier Division East:
  - Torpoint Athletic
- Promoted from the South West Peninsula League Premier Division West:
  - Falmouth Town
- Relegated from the Southern League Division One South:
  - Barnstaple Town

=== League table ===
Pos	Team	Pld	W	D	L	GF	GA	GD	Pts	Promotion, qualification or relegation
1	Mousehole (C, P)	36	26	8	2	93	32	+61	86	Promoted to the Southern League
2	Saltash United	36	26	6	4	98	39	+59	84	Qualification for an inter-step play-off
3	Barnstaple Town	36	24	3	9	77	49	+28	75	
4	Bridgwater United	36	20	9	7	84	41	+43	69	
5	Buckland Athletic	36	22	2	12	69	48	+21	68	
6	Helston Athletic	36	18	12	6	60	38	+22	66	
7	Falmouth Town	36	16	8	12	62	48	+14	56	
8	Shepton Mallet	36	15	10	11	58	45	+13	55	
9	Street	36	13	10	13	49	63	−14	49	
10	Ashton & Backwell United	36	14	6	16	60	52	+8	48	Resigned at the end of the season
11	Clevedon Town	36	13	7	16	60	69	−9	46	
12	Torpoint Athletic	36	12	9	15	68	75	−7	45	
13	Millbrook	36	11	7	18	45	59	−14	40	
14	Welton Rovers	36	10	6	20	47	83	−36	36	
15	Wellington	36	9	8	19	51	72	−21	35	
16	Ilfracombe Town	36	7	11	18	47	65	−18	32	
17	Sherborne Town	36	8	7	21	41	64	−23	31	Transferred to the Wessex League
18	Cadbury Heath	36	4	6	26	34	87	−53	18	Voluntarily demoted to Division One (Note: Cadbury Heath requested voluntary demotion to Division One for the 2023–24 season.)
19	Keynsham Town (R)	36	5	3	28	39	113	−74	18	Relegated to Division One
20	Bitton	0	0	0	0	0	0	0	0 (Note: Bitton resigned from the league on 21 October 2022 and their playing record of P13 W1 D1 L11 GF10 GA37 Pts4 was expunged.)	Resigned from the league

Source: Toolstation Western League.
Rules for classification: 1) points; 2) goal difference; 3) number of goals scored.
(C) Champions; (P) Promoted; (R) Relegated

=== Inter-step play-off ===
29 April 2023	Bristol Manor Farm	2–0	Saltash United	Sea Mills, Bristol
15:00	Robbins 34; Nielsen 63			Stadium: The Creek; Attendance: 379

=== Stadia and locations ===
Location of the clubs in the 2022–23 Western League Premier Division
Location of the clubs in the 2022–23 Western League Premier Division (Somerset)

Club	Location	Stadium	Capacity
Ashton & Backwell United	Backwell	Backwell Recreation Ground	1,000
Barnstaple Town	Barnstaple	Mill Road	5,000
Bitton	Bitton	Bath Road	
Bridgwater United	Bridgwater	Fairfax Park	2,500
Buckland Athletic	Newton Abbot	Homers Heath	1,000
Cadbury Heath	Cadbury Heath	Cadbury Heath Road	
Clevedon Town	Clevedon	North Somerset Community Stadium	3,900
Falmouth Town	Falmouth	Bickland Park	3,572
Helston Athletic	Helston	Kellaway Park	1,300
Ilfracombe Town	Ilfracombe	Marlborough Park	2,000
Keynsham Town	Keynsham	AJN Stadium	3,001
Millbrook	Millbrook	Jenkins Park	1,000
Mousehole	Paul	Trungle Parc	2,000
Saltash United	Saltash	Kimberley Stadium	1,000
Shepton Mallet	Shepton Mallet	Old Wells Road	2,500
Sherborne Town	Sherborne	Raleigh Grove	1,150
Street	Street	The Tannery Ground	1,000
Torpoint Athletic	Torpoint	The Mill	1,000
Wellington	Wellington	Wellington Playing Field	1,000
Welton Rovers	Midsomer Norton	West Clewes Recreation Ground	2,400

== First Division ==
The First Division was increased from 21 clubs to 22 after Sherborne Town and Welton Rovers were promoted to the Premier Division, and Devizes Town were relegated.

Four new clubs joined:

- Brislington, voluntarily demoted from the Premier Division
- Hallen, relegated from the Hellenic Football League Premier Division
- Nailsea & Tickenham, promoted from the Somerset County League
- Shirehampton, promoted from the Gloucestershire County Football League
- Lebeq United changed their name to FC Bristol.
- Brislington are ineligible for promotion after taking voluntary demotion from the Premier Division last season.

=== League table ===
Pos	Team	Pld	W	D	L	GF	GA	GD	Pts	Promotion, qualification or relegation
1	Brislington (C)	42	36	2	4	130	35	+95	110	
2	Nailsea & Tickenham (P)	42	31	5	6	120	45	+75	98	Promoted to the Premier Division
3	Wells City	42	29	9	4	94	38	+56	96	Qualification for the play-offs
4	Oldland Abbotonians (O, P)	42	24	9	9	92	53	+39	81	Qualification for the play-offs
5	Wincanton Town	42	22	5	15	93	71	+22	71	Qualification for the play-offs
6	Shirehampton	42	21	6	15	89	70	+19	69	Qualification for the play-offs
7	Bishop Sutton	42	19	9	14	69	62	+7	66	
8	FC Bristol	42	19	4	19	84	87	−3	61	Transferred to the Hellenic League
9	Hallen	42	16	11	15	70	63	+7	59	
10	Warminster Town	42	16	10	16	57	58	−1	58	
11	AEK Boco	42	17	4	21	73	88	−15	55	
12	Longwell Green Sports	42	16	5	21	78	96	−18	53	
13	Odd Down	42	13	12	17	72	72	0	51	
14	Portishead Town	42	15	7	20	55	70	−15	52	
15	Hengrove Athletic	42	14	8	20	67	71	−4	50	
16	Bristol Telephones	42	14	11	17	59	68	−9	50 (Note: Bristol Telephones had three points deducted.)	
17	Gillingham Town	42	11	8	23	72	100	−28	41	
18	Cheddar	42	10	9	23	53	72	−19	39	
19	Radstock Town	42	8	13	21	57	79	−22	37	
20	Tytherington Rocks	42	9	9	24	41	97	−56	36	Reprieved and transferred to the Hellenic League
21	Bishops Lydeard	42	8	8	26	46	102	−56	32	Reprieved and transferred to the South West Peninsula League
22	Almondsbury (R)	42	7	10	25	38	112	−74	31	Relegated to the Gloucestershire County League

Source: Toolstation Western League.
Rules for classification: 1) points; 2) goal difference; 3) number of goals scored.
(C) Champions; (O) Play-off winners; (P) Promoted; (R) Relegated

=== Promotion playoffs ===
Semi-finals
3	Wells City	0
6	Shirehampton	3
4	Oldland Abbotonians (pens)	2 (11)
5	Wincanton Town	2 (10)

Final
4	Oldland Abbotonians	2
6	Shirehampton	1

==== Semifinals ====
25 April 2023	Wells City	0–3	Shirehampton	Wells
				Stadium: The Athletic Ground

29 April 2023	Oldland Abbotonians	2–2 (11–10 p)	Wincanton Town	Oldland Common
				Stadium: Aitchison Playing Field

==== Final ====
1 May 2023	Oldland Abbotonians	2–1	Shirehampton	Oldland Common
				Stadium: Aitchison Playing Field

=== Stadia and locations ===
Location of the clubs in the 2022–23 Western League Division One
Location of the clubs in the 2022–23 Western League Division One (Bristol)
Location of the clubs in the 2022–23 Western League Division One (Gloucestershire)

Club	Location	Stadium	Capacity
AEK Boco	Hanham	Greenbank Recreation Ground	1,000
Almondsbury	Almondsbury	The Field	
Bishop Sutton	Bishop Sutton	Lakeview	1,500
Bishops Lydeard	Bishops Lydeard	Darby Way	1,000
Brislington	Bristol	Ironmould Lane	3,000
Bristol Telephones	Whitchurch	BTRA Sports Ground	1,000
Cheddar	Cheddar	Draycott Road	
FC Bristol	Almondsbury	Oaklands Park	2,000
Gillingham Town	Gillingham	Woodwater Lane	1,000
Hallen	Hallen	Hallen Centre	2,000
Hengrove Athletic	Whitchurch	Norton Lane	1,000
Longwell Green Sports	Longwell Green	Longwell Green Community Centre	1,000
Nailsea & Tickenham	Nailsea	Fryth Way	1,000
Odd Down	Bath	Lew Hill Memorial Ground	1,000
Oldland Abbotonians	Oldland Common	Aitchison Playing Field	1,000
Portishead Town	Portishead	Bristol Road	1,400
Radstock Town	Radstock	Southfields Recreation Ground	1,250
Shirehampton	Shirehampton	Penpole Lane	1,000
Tytherington Rocks	Tytherington	Hardwicke Playing Field	1,000
Warminster Town	Warminster	Weymouth Street	1,000
Wells City	Wells	Athletic Ground	1,500
Wincanton Town	Wincanton	Wincanton Sports Ground	1,000
