= 2016–17 Western Football League =

Western Football League
- Season: 2016–17
- Champions: Bristol Manor Farm
- Promoted: Bristol Manor Farm
- Relegated: Sherborne Town

The 2016–17 Western Football League season (known as the 2016–17 Toolstation Western Football League for sponsorship reasons) was the 115th in the history of the Western Football League, a football competition in England. Teams were divided into two divisions; the Premier and the First.

== Premier Division ==
The Premier Division was reduced from 21 clubs to 20, and featured two new clubs after Barnstaple Town were promoted to Southern League Division One South & West, Winterbourne United resigned from the league, and Welton Rovers were relegated to the First Division.

- Chipping Sodbury Town, champions of the First Division.
- Wells City, runners-up in the First Division.

Bristol Manor Farm, Buckland Athletic, Clevedon Town, Melksham Town and Street applied for promotion to Step 4 for 2017–18.

With the news that Gillingham Town were resigning from the Western League for financial reasons at the end of the season, and the fact that the Premier Division is already two clubs short, only one club was relegated.

=== League table ===
Pos	Team	Pld	W	D	L	GF	GA	GD	Pts	Promotion or relegation
1	Bristol Manor Farm (C, P)	38	33	3	2	118	33	+85	102	Promotion to Southern League Division One West
2	Street	38	29	5	4	112	46	+66	92	
3	Melksham Town	38	26	7	5	105	43	+62	85	
4	Buckland Athletic	38	26	5	7	98	49	+49	83	
5	Bradford Town	38	20	8	10	90	56	+34	68	
6	Willand Rovers	38	20	7	11	69	52	+17	67	
7	Odd Down	38	19	7	12	89	64	+25	64	
8	Cribbs	38	18	7	13	77	54	+23	61	
9	Gillingham Town	38	18	6	14	80	54	+26	60	Resigned at the end of the season
10	Brislington	38	16	5	17	78	74	+4	53	
11	Cadbury Heath	38	16	5	17	75	75	0	53	
12	Shepton Mallet	38	13	9	16	67	71	−4	48	
13	Chipping Sodbury Town	38	12	6	20	55	83	−28	42	
14	Clevedon Town	38	12	4	22	70	87	−17	40	
15	Wells City	38	10	10	18	67	90	−23	40	
16	Bridport	38	10	7	21	63	86	−23	37	
17	Longwell Green Sports	38	11	1	26	40	113	−73	34	
18	Hallen	38	6	4	28	39	97	−58	22 (Note: Hallen and Bitton were reprieved from relegation.)	
19	Bitton	38	5	4	29	41	97	−56	19	
20	Sherborne Town (R)	38	3	4	31	41	150	−109	13	Relegation to the First Division

Updated to match(es) played on 29 April 2017. Source: .
Rules for classification: 1) points; 2) goal difference; 3) number of goals scored.
(C) Champions; (P) Promoted; (R) Relegated

== First Division ==
The First Division was increased from 21 clubs to 22, and featured three new clubs after the promotion of Chipping Sodbury and Wells City to the Premier Division:

- Bishops Lydeard, promoted from the Somerset County League.
- Malmesbury Victoria, promoted from the Wiltshire League.
- Welton Rovers, relegated from the Premier Division.

=== League table ===
Pos	Team	Pld	W	D	L	GF	GA	GD	Pts	Promotion
1	Wellington (C, P)	42	27	11	4	92	36	+56	92	Promotion to the Premier Division
2	Hengrove Athletic (P)	42	27	7	8	105	37	+68	88	Promotion to the Premier Division
3	Cheddar	42	24	10	8	92	52	+40	82	
4	Keynsham Town	42	26	3	13	82	50	+32	81	
5	Radstock Town	42	21	11	10	85	47	+38	74	
6	Bishops Lydeard	42	20	8	14	76	67	+9	68	
7	Ashton & Backwell United	42	19	7	16	71	69	+2	64	
8	Chippenham Park	42	19	9	14	74	78	−4	63 (Note: Chippenham Park were deducted three points for fielding an ineligible player.)	
9	Malmesbury Victoria	42	18	7	17	82	82	0	61	
10	Chard Town	42	16	11	15	74	74	0	59	
11	Devizes Town	42	16	10	16	72	81	−9	58	
12	Westbury United	42	18	4	20	60	73	−13	58	
13	Wincanton Town	42	16	8	18	83	79	+4	56	
14	Portishead Town	42	16	7	19	48	58	−10	55	
15	Roman Glass St George	42	16	4	22	72	96	−24	52	
16	Bishop Sutton	42	15	6	21	60	63	−3	51	
17	Oldland Abbotonians	42	15	5	22	60	85	−25	50	
18	Warminster Town	42	12	11	19	68	75	−7	47	
19	Corsham Town	42	11	9	22	61	83	−22	42	
20	Welton Rovers	42	10	7	25	54	95	−41	37	
21	Calne Town	42	10	4	28	50	98	−48	34 (Note: Calne Town and Almondsbury UWE were reprieved from relegation.)	
22	Almondsbury UWE	42	7	7	28	67	110	−43	28	

Updated to match(es) played on 20:49, 29 April 2017 (UTC). Source:
Rules for classification: 1) points; 2) goal difference; 3) number of goals scored.
(C) Champions; (P) Promoted
