= 1991–92 Western Football League =

Western Football League
- Season: 1991–92
- Champions: Weston-super-Mare (Premier Division); Westbury United (Division One)

The 1991–92 season was the 90th in the history of the Western Football League.

The league champions for the first time in their history were Weston-super-Mare, who were promoted to the Southern League. The champions of Division One were Westbury United.

== Final tables ==
=== Premier Division ===
The Premier Division remained at 21 clubs after Barnstaple Town and Radstock Town were relegated to the First Division. Two clubs joined:

- Elmore, runners-up in the First Division.
- Minehead, champions of the First Division.

| Pos | Team | Pld | W | D | L | GF | GA | GD | Pts | Promotion or relegation |
|---|---|---|---|---|---|---|---|---|---|---|
| 1 | Weston-super-Mare (C, P) | 40 | 32 | 2 | 6 | 110 | 44 | +66 | 98 | Promoted to the Southern League |
| 2 | Clevedon Town | 40 | 28 | 5 | 7 | 90 | 28 | +62 | 89 | |
| 3 | Tiverton Town | 40 | 27 | 5 | 8 | 106 | 47 | +59 | 85 (Note: Tiverton Town had one point deducted for fielding an ineligible player.) | |
| 4 | Bideford | 40 | 25 | 9 | 6 | 102 | 49 | +53 | 84 | |
| 5 | Saltash United | 40 | 24 | 5 | 11 | 89 | 51 | +38 | 77 | |
| 6 | Plymouth Argyle Reserves | 40 | 24 | 4 | 12 | 89 | 52 | +37 | 76 | |
| 7 | Taunton Town | 40 | 17 | 11 | 12 | 88 | 56 | +32 | 62 | |
| 8 | Mangotsfield United | 40 | 16 | 13 | 11 | 53 | 39 | +14 | 61 | |
| 9 | Elmore | 40 | 17 | 10 | 13 | 76 | 72 | +4 | 61 | |
| 10 | Paulton Rovers | 40 | 16 | 11 | 13 | 71 | 60 | +11 | 59 | |
| 11 | Minehead | 40 | 16 | 10 | 14 | 65 | 74 | −9 | 58 | |
| 12 | Liskeard Athletic | 40 | 14 | 10 | 16 | 68 | 69 | −1 | 52 | |
| 13 | Dawlish Town | 40 | 15 | 5 | 20 | 77 | 76 | +1 | 50 | |
| 14 | Chippenham Town | 40 | 13 | 7 | 20 | 58 | 95 | −37 | 46 | |
| 15 | Torrington | 40 | 11 | 10 | 19 | 48 | 62 | −14 | 43 | |
| 16 | Bristol Manor Farm | 40 | 10 | 10 | 20 | 42 | 66 | −24 | 40 | |
| 17 | Exmouth Town | 40 | 10 | 8 | 22 | 56 | 97 | −41 | 38 | |
| 18 | Chard Town | 40 | 8 | 8 | 24 | 48 | 76 | −28 | 32 | |
| 19 | Frome Town | 40 | 9 | 5 | 26 | 44 | 91 | −47 | 32 | |
| 20 | Welton Rovers (R) | 40 | 8 | 6 | 26 | 32 | 78 | −46 | 30 | Relegated to the First Division |
| 21 | Ottery St Mary (R) | 40 | 2 | 2 | 36 | 26 | 156 | −130 | 8 | Relegated to the First Division |

(C) Champions; (P) Promoted; (R) Relegated

=== First Division ===
The First Division was increased from 21 clubs to 22, after Minehead and Elmore were promoted to the Premier Division, and Yeovil Town Reserves left the league. Four new clubs joined:

- Barnstaple Town, relegated from the Premier Division.
- Bishop Sutton, promoted from the Somerset Senior League.
- Brislington, promoted from the Somerset Senior League.
- Radstock Town, relegated from the Premier Division.

| Pos | Team | Pld | W | D | L | GF | GA | GD | Pts | Promotion |
|---|---|---|---|---|---|---|---|---|---|---|
| 1 | Westbury United (C, P) | 42 | 27 | 10 | 5 | 80 | 39 | +41 | 91 | Promoted to the Premier Division |
| 2 | Torquay United Reserves (P) | 42 | 26 | 11 | 5 | 96 | 32 | +64 | 89 | Promoted to the Premier Division |
| 3 | Crediton United | 42 | 20 | 12 | 10 | 57 | 32 | +25 | 72 | |
| 4 | Bath City Reserves | 42 | 22 | 6 | 14 | 91 | 68 | +23 | 72 | Left at the end of the season |
| 5 | Warminster Town | 42 | 19 | 13 | 10 | 80 | 49 | +31 | 70 | |
| 6 | Keynsham Town | 42 | 19 | 13 | 10 | 80 | 69 | +11 | 70 | |
| 7 | Calne Town | 42 | 20 | 9 | 13 | 73 | 49 | +24 | 69 | |
| 8 | Brislington | 42 | 21 | 6 | 15 | 70 | 51 | +19 | 69 | |
| 9 | Bridport | 42 | 17 | 16 | 9 | 61 | 50 | +11 | 67 | |
| 10 | Ilfracombe Town | 42 | 17 | 14 | 11 | 76 | 44 | +32 | 65 | |
| 11 | Odd Down | 42 | 20 | 5 | 17 | 58 | 46 | +12 | 65 | |
| 12 | Backwell United | 42 | 17 | 10 | 15 | 64 | 49 | +15 | 61 | |
| 13 | Bishop Sutton | 42 | 17 | 10 | 15 | 58 | 50 | +8 | 61 | |
| 14 | Glastonbury | 42 | 14 | 8 | 20 | 52 | 61 | −9 | 50 | |
| 15 | Larkhall Athletic | 42 | 12 | 12 | 18 | 58 | 65 | −7 | 48 | |
| 16 | Radstock Town | 42 | 11 | 14 | 17 | 65 | 68 | −3 | 47 | |
| 17 | Barnstaple Town | 42 | 12 | 8 | 22 | 42 | 55 | −13 | 44 | |
| 18 | Clandown | 42 | 10 | 13 | 19 | 56 | 72 | −16 | 43 | Left to join the Somerset Senior League |
| 19 | Wellington | 42 | 9 | 11 | 22 | 42 | 70 | −28 | 38 | |
| 20 | Devizes Town | 42 | 8 | 13 | 21 | 57 | 84 | −27 | 37 | |
| 21 | Melksham Town | 42 | 8 | 12 | 22 | 44 | 77 | −33 | 36 | |
| 22 | Heavitree United | 42 | 2 | 2 | 38 | 26 | 206 | −180 | 8 | |

Rules for classification: The system of using goal difference to separate two teams tied on points was used. The points system: 3 points for a win, 1 point for a draw and 0 points for losing.
(C) Champions; (P) Promoted
