= 1998–99 Western Football League =

Western Football League
- Season: 1998–99
- Champions: Taunton Town (Premier Division); Minehead Town (Division One)

The 1998–99 season was the 97th in the history of the Western Football League.

The league champions for the fourth time in their history were Taunton Town, but runners-up Tiverton Town took promotion to the Southern League. The champions of Division One were Minehead Town.

== Final tables ==
=== Premier Division ===
The Premier Division remained at 20 clubs after Chard Town and Torrington were relegated to the First Division. Two clubs joined:

- Bishop Sutton, champions of the First Division.
- Yeovil Town Reserves, runners-up in the First Division.

| Pos | Team | Pld | W | D | L | GF | GA | GD | Pts | Promotion or relegation |
|---|---|---|---|---|---|---|---|---|---|---|
| 1 | Taunton Town (C) | 38 | 33 | 3 | 2 | 134 | 33 | +101 | 102 | |
| 2 | Tiverton Town (P) | 38 | 29 | 4 | 5 | 118 | 27 | +91 | 91 | Promoted to the Southern League |
| 3 | Chippenham Town | 38 | 25 | 7 | 6 | 93 | 41 | +52 | 82 | |
| 4 | Melksham Town | 38 | 20 | 10 | 8 | 73 | 44 | +29 | 70 | |
| 5 | Paulton Rovers | 38 | 18 | 12 | 8 | 70 | 42 | +28 | 66 | |
| 6 | Brislington | 38 | 18 | 10 | 10 | 74 | 44 | +30 | 64 | |
| 7 | Yeovil Town Reserves | 38 | 18 | 4 | 16 | 70 | 66 | +4 | 58 | |
| 8 | Bridport | 38 | 16 | 7 | 15 | 61 | 68 | −7 | 55 | |
| 9 | Bridgwater Town | 38 | 15 | 9 | 14 | 68 | 51 | +17 | 54 | |
| 10 | Backwell United | 38 | 15 | 7 | 16 | 56 | 48 | +8 | 52 | |
| 11 | Mangotsfield United | 38 | 14 | 9 | 15 | 60 | 58 | +2 | 51 | |
| 12 | Barnstaple Town | 38 | 14 | 8 | 16 | 72 | 55 | +17 | 50 | |
| 13 | Bristol Manor Farm | 38 | 15 | 4 | 19 | 61 | 57 | +4 | 49 | |
| 14 | Elmore | 38 | 14 | 6 | 18 | 68 | 82 | −14 | 48 | |
| 15 | Bishop Sutton | 38 | 12 | 7 | 19 | 65 | 81 | −16 | 43 | |
| 16 | Westbury United | 38 | 9 | 8 | 21 | 42 | 103 | −61 | 35 | |
| 17 | Bideford | 38 | 10 | 1 | 27 | 40 | 108 | −68 | 31 | |
| 18 | Odd Down | 38 | 5 | 15 | 18 | 44 | 86 | −42 | 30 | |
| 19 | Keynsham Town (R) | 38 | 6 | 7 | 25 | 33 | 99 | −66 | 25 | Relegated to the First Division |
| 20 | Calne Town (R) | 38 | 3 | 4 | 31 | 34 | 143 | −109 | 13 | Relegated to the First Division |

(C) Champions; (P) Promoted; (R) Relegated

=== First Division ===
The First Division remained at 19 clubs after Bishop Sutton and Yeovil Town Reserves were promoted to the Premier Division, and Crediton United left the league. Three clubs joined:

- Chard Town, relegated from the Premier Division.
- Corsham Town, promoted from the Wiltshire League.
- Torrington, relegated from the Premier Division.
- Minehead changed their name to Minehead Town.

| Pos | Team | Pld | W | D | L | GF | GA | GD | Pts | Promotion |
|---|---|---|---|---|---|---|---|---|---|---|
| 1 | Minehead Town (C, P) | 36 | 31 | 4 | 1 | 124 | 25 | +99 | 97 | Promoted to the Premier Division |
| 2 | Dawlish Town (P) | 36 | 27 | 6 | 3 | 83 | 28 | +55 | 87 | Promoted to the Premier Division |
| 3 | Street | 36 | 27 | 4 | 5 | 85 | 36 | +49 | 85 | |
| 4 | Devizes Town | 36 | 20 | 7 | 9 | 79 | 43 | +36 | 67 | |
| 5 | Clyst Rovers | 36 | 21 | 4 | 11 | 76 | 51 | +25 | 67 | |
| 6 | Wellington | 36 | 20 | 6 | 10 | 71 | 42 | +29 | 66 | |
| 7 | Exmouth Town | 36 | 20 | 4 | 12 | 80 | 49 | +31 | 64 | |
| 8 | Pewsey Vale | 36 | 18 | 4 | 14 | 72 | 46 | +26 | 58 | |
| 9 | Corsham Town | 36 | 15 | 10 | 11 | 47 | 58 | −11 | 55 | |
| 10 | Welton Rovers | 36 | 13 | 7 | 16 | 61 | 58 | +3 | 46 | |
| 11 | Bitton | 36 | 12 | 9 | 15 | 67 | 59 | +8 | 45 | |
| 12 | Larkhall Athletic | 36 | 13 | 5 | 18 | 51 | 65 | −14 | 44 | |
| 13 | Ilfracombe Town | 36 | 12 | 7 | 17 | 61 | 71 | −10 | 43 | |
| 14 | Torrington | 36 | 13 | 0 | 23 | 56 | 79 | −23 | 39 | |
| 15 | Warminster Town | 36 | 9 | 3 | 24 | 40 | 79 | −39 | 30 | |
| 16 | Chard Town | 36 | 9 | 2 | 25 | 49 | 102 | −53 | 29 | |
| 17 | Frome Town | 36 | 7 | 5 | 24 | 44 | 102 | −58 | 26 | |
| 18 | Glastonbury | 36 | 3 | 6 | 27 | 47 | 111 | −64 | 15 | Left to join the Somerset Senior League |
| 19 | Heavitree United | 36 | 4 | 3 | 29 | 31 | 120 | −89 | 15 | Left to join the Devon County League |

Rules for classification: The system of using goal difference to separate two teams tied on points was used. The points system: 3 points for a win, 1 point for a draw and 0 points for losing.
(C) Champions; (P) Promoted
