= Oldland =

Village in South Gloucestershire, England

Coordinates: 51.4375°N 2.4833°W

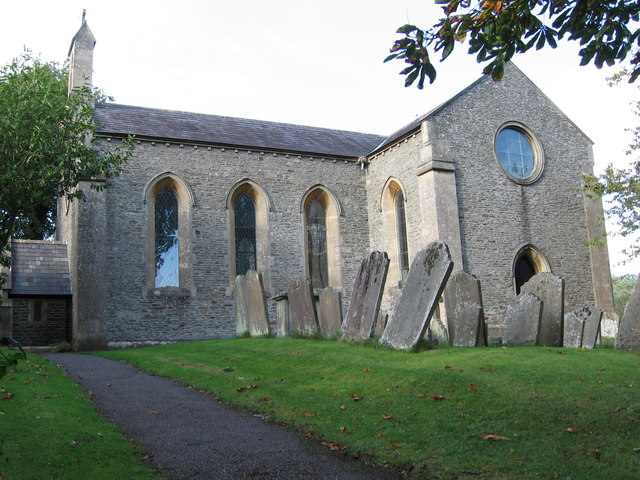

- Location within Gloucestershire
- OS grid reference: ST668712
- Civil parish: Oldland
- Unitary authority: South Gloucestershire
- Ceremonial county: Gloucestershire
- Region: South West
- Country: England
- Sovereign state: United Kingdom
- Post town: BRISTOL
- Postcode district: BS30
- Dialling code: 0117
- Police: Avon and Somerset
- Fire: Avon
- Ambulance: South Western
- UK Parliament: North East Somerset and Hanham

Oldland is a village and civil parish in South Gloucestershire, England. The parish includes the villages of Cadbury Heath and Longwell Green, and part of Willsbridge. It does not include Oldland Common, which is in the parish of Bitton.

== History ==
Oldland was mentioned in the Domesday Book as Aldeland, the Saxon name for "old tract of land". Before the Norman Invasion of England, the overlord of Oldland was King Harold Godwinson, who had appointed Alwy as Lord of the area. After the conquest, King William I of England confiscated the land of Oldland and gave it to the Bishop of Exeter as tenant-in-chief. Oldland consisted of six houses with two plough teams. Oldland went through several variations of its name throughout history. Some of the names were Holande, Wholdland, Wooland during the reign of Queen Elizabeth I, Ouldland after the Restoration of the Monarchy and Eland.

=== Barrs Court ===
Barrs Court is a moated ancient monument which was part of Kingswood Chase, a royal hunting forest (successor to the larger forest of Kingswood, deforested in 1228). The name comes from Lady Jane Barre who owned the land in the mid 15th Century. A manor house existed here from 1485, owned by the Newton family, until it was dismantled in 1740 and replaced with a farmhouse, which is now a ruin. There are a number of monuments in Bristol Cathedral to the Newton family.

One of the original outbuildings, the large cruciform tithe barn, was converted in the late 1980s into a public house; it is now an Indian restaurant.

== Church ==
Oldland had a chapel constructed in 1280. The chapel served the village as a part of the parish of Bitton with clergymen alternating services fortnightly between Oldland chapel and Hanham after performing services in the morning at Bitton's parish church. The churchyard contained a large yew tree which had been growing since the Tudor period. It remained standing until 2020 when it was blown down by a storm. In 1827, the medieval chapel was demolished following Oldland being made its own parish. The newly constructed St Annes Church was consecrated by the Bishop of Lichfield and the Bishop of Gloucester. In 1981, it was granted grade II listed building status by English Heritage. The church's vicarage and gateway were each granted separate grade II listings.
