= Clevedon United F.C. =

Association football club in England

Clevedon United
- Full name: Clevedon United Football Club
- Founded: 1974
- Ground: Coleridge Vale, Clevedon
- Chairman: Stuart Henley
- Manager: Mark Selway
- League: Somerset County League Premier Division
- 2024–25: Somerset County League Premier Division, 7th of 16
Home colours

Clevedon United Football Club is a football club based in Clevedon, Somerset, England. Affiliated to the Somerset County FA, the club are currently members of the Somerset County League Premier Division and play at Coleridge Vale.

== History ==
Clevedon United was formed in 1974 as a merger between Clevedon Sports AFC and Tickenham United.

After years in the Somerset County League, they achieved promotion to the Western Football League Division One after a 3rd-place finish in the 2002–03 season. In their four completed seasons in the Western League, they always finished in the middle third of the table, and remained members of Division One until 2010.

Because of their move to share Clevedon Town's Hand Stadium, they had become eligible to compete in national competitions — their best performances being a run to the second round qualifying of the FA Cup in 2003–04, and reaching the second round proper of the FA Vase in 2000–01.

In 2010 changes in usage charges meant that the team were no longer able to play at the Hand Stadium & subsequently moved back to playing first team matches at Coleridge Vale.

After enjoying spells under the managerial guidance of ex- Bristol City F.C. defender Andrew Llewellyn, and more recently playing duo Adam Tudor and Tony Cook, Clevedon United appointed Mark Selway as manager. Mark Selway worked alongside Chris Wall, Luke Hack and club physio Luke Doran in day-to-day management. Clevedon United were in 2nd place before the cancellation of the 2020–21 season due to the Coronavirus pandemic.

During the Coronavirus pandemic, United won the Somerset Senior cup for the first time in a reformed champions league style format for the competition.

== Ground ==
Clevedon United play their home games at Coleridge Vale, Clevedon, Somerset, BS21 6HG.

== Honours ==
- Somerset Senior League
  - Winners: 1998–99
  - Runners Up: 1987–88, 1991–92, 1992–93, 1997–98
- Somerset Senior Cup
  - Runners Up: 2018
  - Winners: 2021

== Records ==
- Highest League Position
  - 9th in Western League Division One: 2004–05
- Best FA Cup Performance
  - Second qualifying round: 2003–04
- Best FA Vase Performance
  - Second round: 2000–01

== Notable current & former players ==
- Jack Butland
- Jantzen Derrick
- Chris Garland
