= 2021–22 South West Peninsula League =

Football competition in England

The 2021–22 South West Peninsula League season was the 15th in the history of the South West Peninsula League, a football competition in England that feeds the Premier Division of the Western Football League. The league was formed in 2007 from the merger of the Devon County League and the South Western League, and is restricted to clubs based in Cornwall and Devon. The two divisions of the South West Peninsula League are on the same level of the National League System as the Western League Division One (Step 6).

The constitution was announced on 18 May 2021.

After the abandonment of the 2019–20 and 2020–21 seasons due to the COVID-19 pandemic, a number of promotions were decided on a points per game basis over the previous two seasons.

== Premier Division East ==
South West Peninsula League
- Champions: Torpoint Athletic
- Promoted: Torpoint Athletic
- Relegated: Ottery St Mary; Stoke Gabriel & Torbay Police

Premier Division East features 20 teams, the same number as the previous season, after Ilfracombe Town and Millbrook were promoted to the Western League Premier Division.

Two clubs joined from the Devon Football League South & West Division:

- Okehampton Argyle
- Ottery St Mary

On 2 June 2021, Stoke Gabriel merged with Torbay Police, creating Stoke Gabriel & Torbay Police.

=== League table ===
Pos	Team	Pld	W	D	L	GF	GA	GD	Pts	Promotion or relegation
1	Torpoint Athletic (C, P)	38	33	1	4	150	32	+118	100	Promoted to the Western League Premier Division
2	Brixham	38	29	5	4	119	30	+89	92	
3	Okehampton Argyle	38	30	2	6	83	30	+53	92	
4	Ivybridge Town	38	24	6	8	93	48	+45	78	
5	Newton Abbot Spurs	38	21	5	12	94	69	+25	68	
6	Axminster Town	38	17	13	8	93	44	+49	64	
7	Dartmouth	38	18	9	11	73	63	+10	63	
8	Elmore	38	17	4	17	80	72	+8	55	
9	Cullompton Rangers	38	16	5	17	66	63	+3	53	
10	Holsworthy	38	13	12	13	55	61	−6	51	
11	Plymouth Marjon	38	15	2	21	69	101	−32	47	
12	Torrington	38	13	6	19	65	75	−10	45	
13	Bovey Tracey	38	13	6	19	75	90	−15	45	
14	Elburton Villa	38	11	7	20	62	74	−12	40	
15	Honiton Town	38	11	6	21	53	87	−34	39	
16	Crediton United	38	12	2	24	86	99	−13	38	
17	Torridgeside	38	11	4	23	66	96	−30	37	
18	Ottery St Mary	38	15	0	23	66	151	−85	36 (Note: Ottery St Mary had three points deducted for failing to fulfil their fixture at Dartmouth on 14 January 2022. Dartmouth were awarded the three points. They had a further six points deducted for the same reason on 18 March at Plymouth Marjon, and on 23 April at Okehampton Argyle. Each opposing club was again awarded the three points.)	Resigned from the league at the end of the season
19	Sidmouth Town	38	9	6	23	62	108	−46	33	Reprieved from relegation (Note: Due to Ottery St Mary's resignation at the end of the season, they assumed bottom position for the purposes of relegation. Stoke Gabriel & Torbay Police assumed second-bottom position and were relegated on a PPG basis. All third-from-bottom sides at step 6 were reprieved from relegation, including Sidmouth Town, who assumed third-bottom position due to Ottery St Mary's resignation.)
20	Stoke Gabriel & Torbay Police (R)	38	1	1	36	41	158	−117	4	Relegated to the Devon League

Source: SWPL.co.uk
Rules for classification: 1) points; 2) goal difference; 3) number of goals scored.
(C) Champions; (P) Promoted; (R) Relegated

=== Results table ===
Home \ Away	AXM	BOV	BRX	CRE	CUL	DAR	ELB	ELM	HOL	HON	IVY	NAS	OKE	OTT	PLY	SID	STK	TRP	TRS	TRT
Axminster Town	—	2–2	0–3	4–0	2–1	2–2	1–1	2–1	1–1	1–0	1–1	5–0	0–3	15–0	8–0	0–0	4–0	0–4	2–2	2–0
Bovey Tracey	0–1	—	1–1	1–3	3–1	3–0	3–1	1–3	1–0	6–2	4–5	1–2	3–5	0–7	4–1	2–1	3–2	1–6	4–2	6–0
Brixham	2–2	5–0	—	6–1	6–0	3–1	4–0	5–1	4–0	2–0	4–0	2–3	0–0	6–3	6–0	2–0	2–1	2–1	5–1	3–1
Crediton United	4–2	0–1	1–3	—	3–4	1–3	2–1	4–3	1–1	7–0	0–5	1–4	0–1	9–1	1–2	0–4	7–2	1–2	1–2	3–1
Cullompton Rangers	2–0	2–1	1–3	2–1	—	3–0	0–0	0–2	0–2	1–2	1–2	3–5	0–2	5–0	3–0	5–0	2–1	1–2	2–0	1–2
Dartmouth	0–1	3–2	1–1	3–2	0–0	—	2–2	2–3	1–1	1–2	0–3	2–0	1–0	H/W	2–1	6–3	1–0	2–0	4–1	2–1
Elburton Villa	0–3	2–2	2–0	6–0	1–5	0–2	—	2–2	0–3	1–2	0–3	0–0	0–3	3–4	3–1	0–0	13–0	0–2	0–2	2–1
Elmore	1–0	2–0	1–4	1–5	1–0	2–5	0–2	—	1–1	1–1	0–1	0–2	3–4	5–0	2–0	3–1	3–2	0–1	3–1	3–2
Holsworthy	2–2	1–1	1–0	3–1	1–2	0–0	3–2	4–2	—	0–0	0–0	2–1	1–2	1–3	5–1	2–1	5–1	0–3	1–1	2–1
Honiton Town	2–0	1–5	0–1	1–0	1–1	3–3	2–1	1–2	3–1	—	1–4	2–3	0–1	1–4	2–4	2–2	3–0	0–2	0–4	2–2
Ivybridge Town	2–1	4–0	1–1	5–4	2–2	2–1	1–0	1–1	2–0	7–0	—	4–0	1–2	3–1	2–3	5–1	4–0	1–2	1–1	2–1
Newton Abbot Spurs	0–1	2–1	0–3	1–1	2–1	4–4	4–0	2–1	5–1	4–2	2–1	—	3–0	2–3	4–1	7–0	5–1	2–7	5–1	0–0
Okehampton Argyle	0–2	2–0	0–1	1–0	4–1	4–0	3–0	3–0	2–0	1–0	3–1	2–1	—	H/W	3–0	4–0	4–1	0–3	4–1	2–2
Ottery St Mary	0–7	6–0	0–9	2–1	4–2	0–8	1–2	0–9	2–1	1–8	0–7	2–1	0–3	—	4–2	3–1	2–1	0–13	0–1	0–9
Plymouth Marjon	0–5	2–1	0–3	7–0	1–2	1–1	5–2	0–5	3–1	2–0	4–1	2–2	0–3	H/W	—	3–0	2–1	1–2	6–1	5–4
Sidmouth Town	2–2	1–1	1–5	1–6	1–3	6–1	0–3	5–3	0–0	3–1	2–3	3–2	1–6	0–5	6–0	—	4–0	1–5	1–6	3–6
Stoke Gabriel & Torbay Police	0–6	4–4	0–4	4–5	2–3	0–4	2–3	1–7	2–3	0–3	2–3	2–5	0–1	0–5	0–6	3–2	—	1–5	2–3	1–2
Torpoint Athletic	4–4	5–0	2–0	3–1	4–1	4–1	5–1	5–1	6–1	7–1	3–1	6–1	0–2	4–0	5–1	2–0	12–0	—	4–0	5–2
Torridgeside	1–1	1–6	2–4	3–7	0–3	2–3	1–5	0–2	1–2	1–2	0–1	1–3	2–3	8–0	2–1	1–3	6–2	1–0	—	3–1
Torrington	1–1	2–1	1–4	3–2	0–0	0–1	0–1	2–0	2–2	1–0	0–1	0–5	2–0	4–3	5–1	0–2	2–0	0–4	2–0	—

Source: SWPL.co.uk
Legend: Blue = home team win; Yellow = draw; Red = away team win.

=== Stadia and locations ===
Locations of the 2021–22 South West Peninsula League Premier Division East teams

Team	Location	Stadium	Capacity
Axminster Town	Axminster	Tiger Way	3,000
Bovey Tracey	Bovey Tracey	Mill Marsh Park	3,000
Brixham	Brixham	Wall Park	2,000
Crediton United	Crediton	Lords Meadow	3,000
Cullompton Rangers	Cullompton	Speeds Meadow	1,000
Dartmouth	Dartmouth	Long Cross	1,000
Elburton Villa	Plymouth	Haye Road	2,000
Elmore	Tiverton	Horsdon Park	2,000
Holsworthy	Holsworthy	Upcott Field	2,000
Honiton Town	Honiton	Mountbatten Park	800
Ivybridge Town	Ivybridge	Erme Valley	2,000
Newton Abbot Spurs	Newton Abbot	Recreation Ground	3,000
Okehampton Argyle	Okehampton	Simmons Park	2,500
Ottery St Mary	Ottery St Mary	Washbrook Meadows	1,000
Plymouth Marjon	Plymouth	The Campus	1,000
Sidmouth Town	Sidmouth	Manstone Lane	2,500
Stoke Gabriel & Torbay Police	Stoke Gabriel	Kia Speedwell Stadium	1,000
Torpoint Athletic	Torpoint	The Mill	1,000
Torridgeside	Great Torrington	Donnacroft	1,000
Torrington	Great Torrington	Vicarage Field	500

== Premier Division West ==
South West Peninsula League
- Champions: Falmouth Town
- Promoted: Falmouth Town
- Relegated: St Dennis

Premier Division West features 18 teams, reduced from 20 the previous season after Helston Athletic, Mousehole and Saltash United were promoted to the Western League Premier Division.

One new club joined from the St Piran Football League West Division:

- Penryn Athletic

=== League table ===
Pos	Team	Pld	W	D	L	GF	GA	GD	Pts	Promotion or relegation
1	Falmouth Town (C, P)	32	30	1	1	124	30	+94	91	Promoted to the Western League Premier Division
2	Liskeard Athletic	32	21	7	4	98	48	+50	70	
3	Wendron United	32	21	4	7	92	54	+38	67	
4	Camelford	32	19	7	6	86	49	+37	64	
5	St Blazey	32	17	6	9	83	54	+29	57	
6	Dobwalls	32	18	1	13	59	54	+5	55	
7	Bodmin Town	32	15	4	13	69	61	+8	49	
8	Launceston	32	13	7	12	49	45	+4	46	
9	Callington Town	32	12	8	12	68	50	+18	44	
10	Wadebridge Town	32	13	5	14	62	65	−3	44	
11	Newquay	32	13	3	16	61	67	−6	42	
12	St Austell	32	11	6	15	50	62	−12	39	
13	Penryn Athletic	32	12	2	18	65	80	−15	38	
14	Sticker	32	9	3	20	40	82	−42	30	
15	Godolphin Atlantic (Newquay)	32	6	6	20	56	93	−37	24	
16	Penzance	32	4	0	28	35	102	−67	9 (Note: Penzance had three points deducted for failing to fulfil their fixture at Camelford on 15 April 2022. Camelford were awarded the three points.)	Reprieved from relegation (Note: All third-from-bottom sides in step 6 were reprieved from relegation, and nine second-bottom sides were also reprieved, on a PPG basis. St Dennis were initially relegated due to insufficient PPG, but later reprieved.)
17	St Dennis	32	2	2	28	28	129	−101	8	Reprieved from relegation
18	Porthleven	0	0	0	0	0	0	0	0 (Note: Porthleven resigned from the league on 14 September 2021 and their playing record of P7 W1 D2 L4 GF6 GA20 Pts5 was expunged.)	Resigned from the league

Source: SWPL.co.uk
Rules for classification: 1) points; 2) goal difference; 3) number of goals scored.
(C) Champions; (P) Promoted

=== Results table ===
Home \ Away	BOD	CAL	CAM	DOB	FAL	GAN	LAU	LIS	NQY	PNR	PNZ	POR	STA	STB	STD	STI	WAD	WEN
Bodmin Town		3–1	1–4	2–1	1–4	4–0	2–1	3–4	1–1	2–1	1–0		3–2	4–1	9–1	1–1	3–0	0–4
Callington Town	4–2		2–3	1–2	0–4	5–3	1–2	2–3	2–2	7–0	5–0		5–1	1–1	3–1	1–1	4–1	0–1
Camelford	2–2	0–2		2–0	1–6	6–0	5–1	3–3	3–0	3–2	H/W		1–2	2–2	7–0	3–0	2–3	3–3
Dobwalls	2–0	0–1	1–0		1–4	1–2	0–2	2–1	4–1	3–0	3–1		2–3	6–1	6–1	1–0	1–4	1–0
Falmouth Town	4–3	3–0	4–2	6–0		7–1	5–0	0–0	3–2	5–0	3–0		2–1	2–3	4–0	5–2	4–2	5–2
Godolphin Atlantic (Newquay)	1–5	1–1	3–4	3–5	0–5		2–2	0–3	1–3	3–4	3–4		1–1	1–3	8–0	3–4	2–4	0–3
Launceston	1–0	0–0	1–2	0–1	0–3	1–1		1–2	2–0	4–1	5–0		1–3	1–4	3–1	1–0	3–0	2–2
Liskeard Athletic	3–0	3–3	2–2	4–1	1–3	3–2	2–1		2–1	4–1	9–1		7–1	2–2	5–0	0–1	2–1	3–2
Newquay	1–3	0–1	0–5	6–1	0–3	1–5	3–2	0–4		3–1	3–0		2–1	3–3	7–0	3–1	2–1	2–4
Penryn Athletic	2–1	2–2	1–2	1–2	2–3	1–0	1–3	1–3	1–0		3–2		0–2	2–4	8–1	3–4	1–0	3–3
Penzance	1–3	2–1	1–4	1–3	1–5	0–1	1–3	1–4	0–4	1–4			2–0	1–6	6–1	1–2	1–4	1–2
Porthleven																		
St Austell	2–1	0–0	1–3	0–0	1–4	1–1	1–1	1–1	1–2	3–1	3–1			1–5	1–0	4–0	1–3	0–2
St Blazey	6–0	2–0	1–2	1–2	0–2	1–2	1–1	2–4	3–1	5–0	4–2		2–1		3–2	3–1	1–2	5–2
St Dennis	3–3	0–5	0–4	0–2	1–4	0–2	0–1	1–6	3–1	1–5	2–1		1–3	0–4		0–2	2–3	0–3
Sticker	0–1	2–1	1–2	0–1	1–3	4–1	0–3	1–7	2–3	1–8	4–0		0–6	0–2	2–2		1–0	0–4
Wadebridge Town	0–3	3–2	2–2	3–2	2–7	3–3	0–0	1–1	1–2	1–2	2–0		3–0	2–2	5–2	3–0		3–4
Wendron United	3–2	2–5	2–2	3–2	0–2	4–0	1–0	7–0	3–2	2–3	5–2		5–2	2–0	3–2	6–2	3–0	

Source: SWPL.co.uk
Legend: Blue = home team win; Yellow = draw; Red = away team win.

=== Stadia and locations ===
Locations of the 2021–22 South West Peninsula League Premier Division West teams

Team	Location	Stadium	Capacity
AFC St Austell	St Austell	Poltair Park	6,000
Bodmin Town	Bodmin	Priory Park	5,000
Callington Town	Callington	Marshfield Parc	1,000
Camelford	Camelford	Trefrew Park	1,000
Dobwalls	Dobwalls	Lantoom Park	2,000
Falmouth Town	Falmouth	Bickland Park	6,000
Godolphin Atlantic (Newquay)	Newquay	Godolphin Way	1,000
Launceston	Launceston	Pennygillam	1,000
Liskeard Athletic	Liskeard	Lux Park	2,000
Newquay	Newquay	Mount Wise Stadium	5,000
Penryn Athletic	Penryn	Kernick Road	2,000
Penzance	Penzance	Penlee Park	1,100
Porthleven	Porthleven	Gala Parc	1,500
St Blazey	St Blazey	Blaise Park	3,500
St Dennis	St Dennis	Boscawen Park	2,000
Sticker	Sticker	Burngullow Lane	2,000
Wadebridge Town	Wadebridge	Bodieve Park	1,500
Wendron United	Wendron	Underlane	1,000
