= Heavitree United F.C. =

Association football club in England

Heavitree United FC
- Full name: Heavitree United Football Club
- Nickname: The Heavies
- Founded: 1885
- Ground: Wingfield Park
- Chairman: Barry King
- Manager: TBC
- League: Devon & Exeter League Division Two
- 2025–26: Devon & Exeter League Division Two, 6th of 11

Heavitree United Football Club is an English football club based in Heavitree, Exeter, Devon. From 1976 to 1999, the club played in the Western League. They are currently members of the Devon & Exeter League Division Two.

== History ==
Formed in 1885, Heavitree United played at various locations in and around Heavitree Park until World War II. Around 1950, they moved to Wingfield Park. Playing in local leagues until 1976 and attracting crowds of up to 5,000, they moved up from the Devon and Exeter League to the new First Division of the Western League for the 1976–77 season.

Heavitree never managed to gain promotion to the Premier Division, and usually struggled in the First, their best finish being 10th in 1985–86. They finished bottom in their first season and in 1991–92, and again in 1998–99, after which the club dropped down to the Devon County League.

The club found little success at this lower level, although they finished fourth in 2000–01. Heavitree dropped down a further level in 2004 when they left the Devon County League and merged with Heavitree Social Club F.C. in the Devon and Exeter League.

In 2011 Heavitree United started a youth team, run by former player and Sunday team manager Liam Bolt. There is no longer any youth team, as of 2026.

== Ground ==
Heavitree United FC play their home games at Wingfield Park, East Wonford Hill, Exeter, Devon, EX1 3BS.

Wingfield Park has seen some major improvements over the past few years with a new stand being erected around the main pitch, and a floodlit 3G training pitch installed. The club have also had their old changing facilities demolished and replaced with new changing rooms, with a tea bar and seating area.
