= Mendip Broadwalk F.C. =

Association football club in England

Mendip Broadwalk
- Full name: Mendip Broadwalk F.C.
- Founded: 2015; 11 years ago
- Ground: Filwood Fields, Creswicke Road, Bristol
- League: Western League Division One
- 2024–25: Western League Division One, 10th of 22

Mendip Broadwalk Football Club is a football club based in Bristol. They are currently members of the Western League Division One and play at Filwood Fields, Creswicke Road.

== History ==
Mendip Broadwalk F.C. was formed in 2015, in a merger between Mendip United and Broadwalk.

Mendip United was formed in 2000 as Mendip Gate, and first played in the Bristol & Avon League before progressing to the Bristol and District League, changing their name in 2002. Subsequently they joined the Bristol Premier Combination, and won Division One in 2007–08. They won the Premier Division the following season, and were champions again four times in the next six years.

Broadwalk F.C. was formed in 1998, and was primarily a youth football club, although it did sometimes feature adult teams. They later began playing at Filwood Fields, where Mendip United were already tenants. The two clubs merged in 2015, and took United's place in the Bristol Premier Combination. The merged club won the league in 2015–16, gaining promotion to the Somerset County League.

Mendip Broadwalk gained three promotions in successive seasons to reach the Premier Division in 2019–20. They finished runners-up in 2021–22, and won the title in 2023–24, gaining promotion to Division One of the Western League.

== Honours ==
- Bristol Premier Combination
  - Champions 2008–09, 2010–11, 2011–12, 2013–14, 2014–15 (as Mendip United), 2015–16
- Somerset County League
  - Champions 2023–24
