= Nailsea United F.C. =

Association football club in England

Nailsea United
- Full name: Nailsea United Football Club
- Founded: 1897
- Ground: South West Civils Community Stadium
- Chairman: Barry Maxted
- Manager: Rikki Hutt
- League: Western League Division One
- 2025–26: Somerset County League Premier Division, 1st of 15 (promoted)
Home colours	Away colours

Nailsea United Football Club is a football club based in Nailsea, England. They are currently members of the Western League Division One.

== History ==
Nailsea United were established in 1897. They spent at least forty seasons in the Somerset County League and its predecessor, the Somerset Senior League. As champions of Division One in 1995–96, they were promoted to the Premier Division where they remained for thirty seasons. During this period, they finished as league champions six times: in 2002–03; 2007–08; 2011–12; 2012–13; 2013–14; and 2025–26, but promotion to a higher league had to wait until 2026.

In 2026, the club was admitted into the Western League Division One.
