= Portishead Town F.C. =

Association football club in England

Coordinates: 51°28′28″N 2°45′49″W

Portishead Town
- Full name: Portishead Town Football Club
- Nickname: Posset
- Founded: 1912 (as St. Peters Portishead)
- Ground: Bristol Road, Portishead
- Chairman: Adrian Green
- League: Western League Premier Division
- 2025–26: Southern League Division One South, 2nd of 22 (demoted)
- Website: https://portisheadtownfc.com/
Home colours	Away colours

Portishead Town Football Club, formerly Portishead A.F.C., are a football club based in Portishead, North Somerset, England founded in 1912. The men's first team are currently members of the Western League Premier Division and the Ladies first team are members of the FA Women's National League South West Division 1. The club is also home to nearly 900 Junior players aged between 5–16 as part of a merger between other Portishead junior football teams. The club is affiliated to the Somerset County FA. They have recently gone onto win the Western League Division One title, securing promotion to the Premier Division for the 2024/25 season.

== History ==
Originally known St. Peter's Portishead until a name change in 1948, the club played in small regional leagues for years until joining the Somerset County League in 1975. They won the Premier Division title four times in five years between 1993–94 and 1997–98. After their fourth successive runner-up campaign in the 2004–05 season, Portishead successfully applied for promotion to the Western League.

In Portishead's first season of Western League football, they finished in the top half of the table only to better their performance the following season. In 2006–07, Portishead achieved their then-highest ever finish in the history of the club finishing runners-up to Truro City Although Portishead finished as runners-up, they were unable to be promoted to the Western League Premier Division as their ground was not suitable, lacking (at that time) floodlights. The 2023–24 season saw Portishead crowned champions of Western League Division One, an 8–0 thrashing of Gillingham Town securing the title.

The following season, the club spent their first three months in the Premier Division playing games away from home or at neutral venues, as their Bristol Road ground went under total redevelopment, including the installation of an artificial playing surface. They returned home on 16 November, with a 3-0 win over Ilfracombe Town in front of a record-breaking 579 fans. This record would later be broken again, as 1,045 spectators watched them defeat local rivals Clevedon Town on 25 February.

Despite finishing second in the 2025-26 Southern Football League Division One South, which would have enabled them to qualify for the promotion play-offs, the club were instead disqualified from the play-offs and relegated to Step 5 due to ground grading issues.

=== Reserve team ===
The reserve squad plays in the Somerset County League Division one, while the 'A', team play in the Weston super Mare and District League.

== Honours ==
- Western Football League

Premier Division Champions 2024-25

  - Division One Winners (1): 2023–24
- Somerset County Football League
  - Winners (4): 1993–94, 1994–95, 1995–96, 1997–98
  - Runners-up (4): 2001–02, 2002–03, 2003–04, 2004–05
- Somerset Senior Cup
  - Winners (2): 1996–97, 2007–08
- Somerset Hospital Cup
  - Winners (1): 2009
- Weston super Mare and District League Division 1
  - Winners (1): 2016
- Attwell Memorial Shield Cup
  - Winners (2): 2009, 2015

== Records ==
- Best league finish - 2nd, Southern League Division One South (2025-26)
- Best FA Cup performance - First qualifying round, 2016–17 & 2026-27
- Best FA Vase performance - Fourth round, 2024–25
- Highest attendance - 1,045 v. Clevedon Town (25 February 2025)
- Most goals scored in a season - 55, Ethan Feltham (2023–24)

== Portishead Town Ladies ==
Having previously had a Ladies team, Portishead Town resurrected the Ladies section in 2011. The team was to be led by Chip Wright and were elected to join Somerset County Women's League. After initially struggling, the 2015/2016 season saw the team achieving a league and cup double, beating Staplegrove in the final 2–0. The 2016/17 season followed on from the previous year with a league and cup double once again, this time beating Penn Mill 4–3 in a thrilling final.

With promotion to South West Regional Women's Football League, Portishead Town Ladies won their third successive promotion in 2017/18 from the Eastern Division on goal difference from Royal Wootton Basset Ladies. The Ladies were then promoted to The FA Women's National League South West Div.1 where they are currently competing. During the 2017/18 season, the Ladies Reserves team was created, who compete in the Somerset County Women's League, winning Division Two in their first season and currently compete in Division One.

The Ladies team are currently managed by Joshua Richards.

Honours

Somerset County Women's League

Division 1 Winners: 2015–16, 2016–17

Division 1 Runners-up: 2013–14

Division 2 Winners: 2017-18 (reserves)

Somerset County Women's League Cup

Winners: 2015–16, 2016–17

Runners-up: 2014–15

South West Regional Women's Football League

Eastern Division Winners: 2017–18

== Portishead Town Youth ==
In an effort to modernise the club, increase the membership numbers and preserve the clubs status for future generations the club merged with two local junior clubs, Portishead Junior FC and Gordano Valley Giants to create Portishead Town Youth. The Junior section offers community football for both boys and girls with teams competing in junior leagues across Bristol and North Somerset. With over 900 junior members, Portishead Town FC is one of the largest junior club's in the South West of England.

== Posset Pathway ==
Following a restructure of the U18s Elite pathway in the 2022/23 season, the club moved away from parent-coach setups to independent coaches, appointing Ash Clemence and Ed Geary. Portishead Town achieved year-on-year success on the pitch, gaining promotion in their first season from the Western Counties Floodlit Youth League Division One to the Premier Division.

Players progressing through the pathway were encouraged to move into Portishead Town's senior teams. The pathway was further strengthened with the appointment of Dave Griffiths, whose role focused on supporting players' transition from U16 football into U18 and men's football. Following the addition of Mike Tipson to the coaching staff, the U18 Floodlit team went on to win the Premier Division title in the 2025/26 season, with two games to spare.

The same coaching philosophy was subsequently applied across all U18 teams, resulting in a significant increase in player throughput from the First Team down to the Fourth Team.

== Ground ==
Portishead Town play their home games at Bristol Road, Portishead, Bristol, BS20 6QG.
