= Clevedon Town F.C. =

English football club

Coordinates: 51°25′24″N 2°50′12″W

Clevedon Town
- Full name: Clevedon Town Football Club
- Nickname: The Seasiders
- Founded: 1880 (as Clevedon)
- Ground: Hand Stadium, Kenn
- Capacity: 3,500 (300 seated)
- Chairman: Paul Davis
- Manager: Jamie Cureton
- League: Western League Premier Division
- 2025–26: Western League Premier Division, 4th of 18
Home colours	Away colours

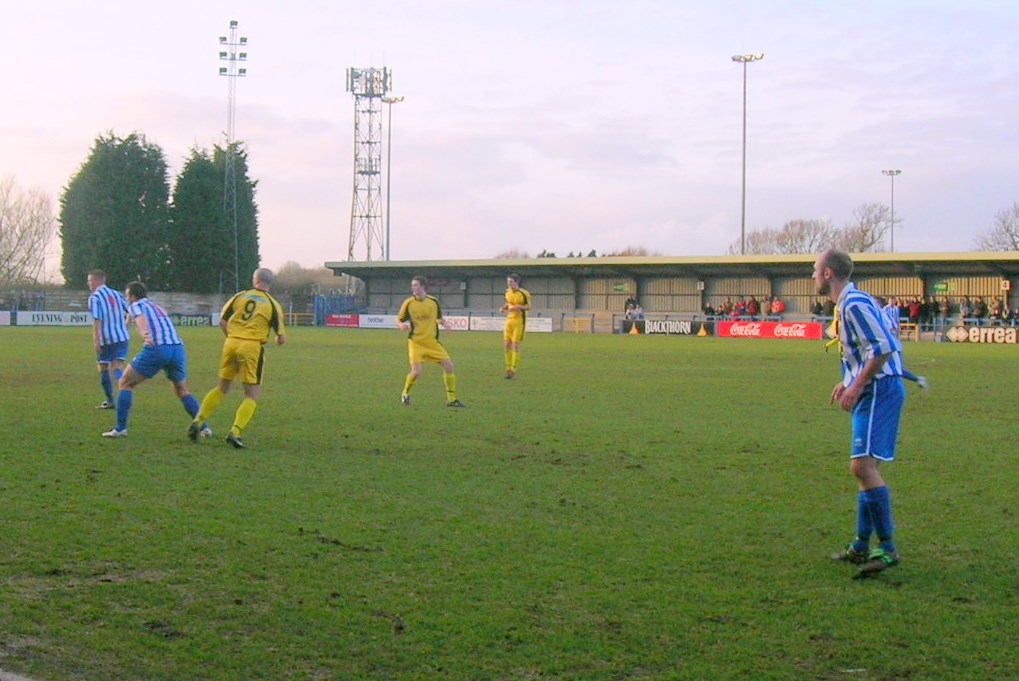
Clevedon Town (wearing blue kit) playing at the Hand Stadium on 26 December 2007

Clevedon Town Football Club is a semi-professional football club representing Clevedon, Somerset, England. Affiliated to the Somerset County FA, they are currently members of the Western League Premier Division and play at the Hand Stadium in Kenn.

The club's motto 'vigilate et orate' is Latin for 'watch and pray'.

== History ==
The club was established in 1880 as Clevedon Football Club, and won the Somerset Medal Competition in 1887–88. They were founder members of the Bristol & District League in 1892, but left after finishing bottom of the league in 1894–95. The club subsequently became members of Division One of the South Bristol & District League, which was renamed the Bristol & District Alliance and then the East Bristol & District League before becoming new Bristol & District League in the late 1890s after the original one had been renamed the Western League. They won the Somerset Junior Cup in 1897–98, and the Senior Cup in 1901–02, beating Minehead 2–0 in a replay after the original final ended 0–0. The club won the Senior Cup again in 1904–05. They returned to the Western League in 1910 and finished bottom of the league in 1911–12 and 1912–13. When football resumed after World War I the club were back in the Bristol & District League.

Clevedon transferred to the Bristol & Suburban League in 1925 and went on to win the new league at the first attempt. They were champions again in 1927–28 and 1928–29, also winning the Somerset Senior Cup in 1928–29. In the early 1930s the club transferred to the Somerset County League, going on to win the league in 1936–37. During World War II they played in the Weston-super-Mare & District League, winning it in 1939–40, 1943–44 and 1944–45. After the war the club returned to the Western League, and were placed in Division One when it gained a second division in 1946. However, after finishing second-from-bottom of Division One in 1948–49 the club were relegated to Division Two.

Clevedon remained in Division Two until resigning from the league at the end of the 1957–58 season for financial reasons. They dropped into Division Two of the Bristol Premier Combination and were promoted to Division One after finishing as Division Two runners-up in their first season in the league. In 1974 the club absorbed Western League club Ashtonians, taking their place in the league. When the league expanded again in 1976, they were placed in the Premier Division. After winning the Someset Senior Cup in 1976–77, the club was renamed Clevedon Town. In 1986–87 they reached the Somerset Premier Cup final. However, in the other semi-final Yeovil Town beat Bath City 2–1. However, Bath successfully challenged the result due to Yeovil playing an ineligible player and the tie was ordered to be replayed. However, both clubs claimed their players' contracts would not allow them to fit in the replay and both withdrew from the competition, giving Clevedon a walkover in the final.

The 1991–92 season saw Clevedon finish as runners-up in the Premier Division. They were league champions the following season, earning promotion to the Midland Division of the Southern League. The club were transferred to the Southern Division in 1994 and back to the Midland Division in 1998. They went on to win the Somerset Premier Cup in 1998–99 beating Taunton Town on penalties in the final, as well as winning the Midland Division title, securing promotion to the Premier Division. Although they won the Premier Cup again in 2000–01 with a 1–0 win over Odd Down, the season also saw them relegated from the Premier Division, dropping into the renamed Division One West.

Clevedon retained the Somerset Premier Cup in 2001–02, beating Team Bath 2–1 in the final. A fourth-place finish in 2004–05 saw them qualify for the promotion playoffs, in which they lost 3–2 to Bromsgrove Rovers in the semi-finals. However, they were Division One West champions the following season and were promoted to the Premier Division. In 2006–07 the club reached the first round of the FA Cup for the first time, losing 4–1 at home to Chester City in front of a record Hand Stadium crowd of 2,261. After four seasons in the Premier Division they were relegated to Division One South & West at the end of the 2009–10 season. Although they won the League Cup in 2011–12, the club resigned from the Southern League after the 2014–15 season and dropped into the Premier Division of the Western League. In 2023–24 they finished fourth in the Premier Division, qualifying for the promotion play-offs. After beating Bridgwater United 1–0 in the semi-finals, the club lost the final 2–0 to Falmouth Town. They were Premier Division runners-up the following season, going on to beat Buckland Athletic 2–1 in the play-off semi-finals before losing in the final fonr a second consecutive season, this time 2–1 to Brixham.

== Ground ==
The club originally played at Dial Hill, now a cricket ground, before moving to Old Street in 1895. The ground was later renamed Teignmouth Road. They bought the site in 1949, and floodlights were installed in the early 1980s. However, the cost of the lights and a new clubhouse caused financial problems that led to the club selling the ground, with the last match played there on 20 April 1992. Clevedon then relocated to the Hand Stadium, named for the Hand family who had been heavily involved in the club since the 1890s. A 300-seat stand was built on one side of the pitch, with a 1,000-capacity covered terrace on the other.

== Honours ==
- Southern League
  - Division One West champions 2005–06
  - Midland Division champions 1998–99
  - League Cup winners 2011–12
- Western League
  - Premier Division champions 1992–93
- Weston-super-Mare & District League
  - Champions 1939–40, 1943–44, 1944–45
- Somerset County League
  - Champions 1936–37
- Bristol & Suburban League
  - Champions 1925–26, 1927–28, 1928–29
- Somerset Premier Cup
  - Winners 1986–87, 1998–99, 2000–01, 2001–02
- Somerset Senior Cup
  - Winners 1901–02, 1904–05, 1928–29, 1976–77
- Somerset Junior Cup
  - Winners 1897–98
- Somerset Medal Competition
  - Winners 1887–88
- Clevedon Charity Cup
  - Winners 1926–27, 1930–31

== Records ==
- Best FA Cup performance: First round, 2006–07
- Best FA Trophy performance: Second round, 1998–99, 2000–01
- Best FA Vase performance: Quarter-finals, 1987–88
- Record attendance: 2,300 vs Billingham Synthonia, FA Amateur Cup, 1952–53
  - At the Hand Stadium: 2,261 vs Chester City, FA Cup first round, 11 November 2006

== See also ==
- Clevedon Town F.C. players
- Clevedon Town F.C. managers
