= Bishops Lydeard A.F.C. =

Association football club in England

Coordinates: 51.067068°N 3.1842890°W

Bishops Lydeard
- Full name: Bishops Lydeard Association Football Club
- Founded: 1912
- Ground: Darby Way, Bishops Lydeard
- Chairman: Gary Brown
- Manager: Paul West
- League: South West Peninsula League Premier Division East
- 2024–25: South West Peninsula League Premier Division East, 14th of 16
Home colours

Bishops Lydeard Association Football Club is a football club based in Bishops Lydeard, near Taunton, in Somerset, England. They are currently members of the South West Peninsula League Premier Division East and play at Darby Way.

== History ==
The club was established in 1912 and later became members of the Taunton & District League. They won both the League Cup and the Seward Memorial Cup in 1952–53, and were Division Two champions in 1960–61, as well as winning the Seward Memorial Cup for a second time. The club won the League Cup again in 1988–89 and went on to win the Division One title in 1991–92. The following season saw them retain the Division One title and win the League Cup, with the club retaining the League Cup in 1993–94. After winning the League Cup again in 2000–01, they won Division One for a third time in 2002–03, earning promotion to Division Three of the Somerset County League.

Bishops Lydeard were Division Three champions in 2004–05 and were promoted to Division Two. The following season saw the club win the Division Two & Three League Cup, as well as finishing second in Division Two, earning promotion to Division One. They were Division One champions in 2007–08 and were promoted to the Premier Division. The club finished as runners-up in the Premier Division in 2009–10, and after winning the division in 2015–16, they were promoted to Division One of the Western League. At the end of the 2022–23 season the club were transferred to the Premier Division East of the South West Peninsula League.

== Honours ==
- Somerset County League
  - Premier Division champions 2015–16
  - Division One champions 2007–08
  - Division Three champions 2004–05
  - Division Two & Three League Cup winners 2005–06
- Taunton & District League
  - Division One champions 1991–92, 1992–93, 2002–03
  - Division Two champions 1960–61
  - League Cup winners 1952–53, 1988–89, 1992–93, 1993–94, 2000–01
  - Seward Memorial Cup winners 1952–53, 1960–61
  - Rowbarton Charity Cup winners 1961–62

== Records ==
- Best FA Vase performance: First round, 2025–26
