= Falmouth Town A.F.C. =

Association football club in England

Coordinates: 50°09′22″N 5°05′55″W

Falmouth Town
- Full name: Falmouth Town Association Football Club
- Nickname: The Town
- Founded: 1949
- Ground: Bickland Park, Falmouth
- Capacity: 3,572
- Chairman: Dale McIntosh
- Manager: John Fabby
- League: Southern League Division One South
- 2025–26: Southern League Division One South, 14th of 22
Home colours	Away colours

Falmouth Town Association Football Club is a football club based in Falmouth, Cornwall, United Kingdom. They are currently members of the Southern League Division One South and play at Bickland Park. The club were the first Cornish team to reach the first round proper of the FA Cup, which they have done on three occasions; 1962–63, 1967–68 and 1969–70.

== History ==
The club was established in 1949 and joined the Cornwall Senior League for the 1950–51 season. In 1951 they were founder members of the South Western League. They finished bottom of the league in 1952–53 and again in 1954–55, but won their first trophy in 1957–58, beating Newquay 1–0 in the League Cup final. They were league runners-up the following season, also retaining the League Cup with a 6–3 win over Truro City in the final. In 1961–62 they won the league for the first time, also winning the League Cup and the Cornwall Senior Cup, thrashing St Blazey 7–1 in the Senior Cup final. The following season saw them become the first club from Cornwall to reach the first round of the FA Cup, winning through four qualifying rounds before eventually losing 2–1 at home to Fourth Division Oxford United in front of a record crowd of 8,000. In 1964–65 the club missed out on a second league title by one point after being deducted two points. However, they won the league the following season.

In 1967–68 Falmouth reached the first round of the FA Cup for a second time, this time losing 5–2 at Third Division Peterborough United. The season also saw them win the South Western League title for a third time. Another appearance in the first round in 1969–70 resulted in another defeat to Peterborough, this time losing 4–1 at home. The club went on to win the four consecutive South Western League titles between 1970–71 and 1973–74, also winning the League Cup and Cornwall Senior Cup in 1970–71, a season in which they remained unbeaten in all three competitions; over the next three seasons they only lost five league matches. Their dominance in local football led the club to move up to the Western League in 1974. The club's first season in the league saw them win the league and League Cup double without losing a game. They then won the league for the next three seasons, marking eight consecutive league titles. This included a 58-match unbeaten stretch in the league that saw them go unbeaten in the Western League until January 1976.

In 1978–79 Falmouth finished eighth in the Western League and the following season saw them finish in the bottom half. In 1983 the club withdrew from the league due to increased travelling costs. However, an application to rejoin the South Western League was rejected and they dropped into the Cornwall Combination. After winning the Combination at the first attempt, they were allowed to rejoin the South Western League. The club went on to win back-to-back league titles in 1985–86 and 1986–87 and again in 1988–89 and 1989–90. Further league titles followed in 1991–92, 1996–97 and 1999–2000. When the South Western League merged with the Devon County League to form the South West Peninsula League in 2007, the club were placed in the Premier Division of the new league. In 2017–18 they won the League Cup, beating Tavistock 4–2 after extra time in the final. At the start of the following season the club won the league's Charity Bowl with a 2–1 win over Plymouth Parkway.

Following league reorganisation at the end of the 2018–19 season, Falmouth were placed in the Premier Division West. In 2021–22 they won the Cornwall Senior Cup and were Premier Division West champions. This earned promotion to the Premier Division of the Western League after a forty-year absence. In 2023–24 they won the Cornwall Senior Cup again, and were Premier Division runners-up to Helston Athletic, qualifying for the promotion play-offs. After beating Barnstaple Town 3–1 in the semi-finals, Falmouth defeated Clevedon Town 2–0 in the final to secure promotion to Division One South of the Southern League for the first time in their history.

== Ground ==
The club initially played at the Recreation Ground, before moving to Union Corner when they joined the South Western League. Over 1,200 spectators attended the club's first South Western League match on 18 August 1951, the game ending in a 3–3 draw. The ground was a farmer's field with players initially having to change in a nearby YMCA and then travel to the ground by bus. Shortly afterwards the club bought two fields at Ashfield, where a new ground was built. However, this was soon sold to Shell-Mex & BP for £20,000, with the club moving back to Union Corner for a season in 1956. The money allowed them to build a new ground at Bickland Park, which opened in August 1957 with Newquay the first visitors. In the early 1960s the club played a home game at Falmouth Docks' Mongleath/Boslowick as Bickland Park was being used for a Cornwall FA match.

Bickland Park has covered stands on all four sides of the ground, with the main stand on one side of the pitch set into banking. The other three sides of the ground have covered standing areas. Floodlights were installed in 1973, although their first use was on 10 April 1974 for a match against Porthleven.

== Honours ==
- Western League
  - Champions 1974–75, 1975–76, 1976–77, 1977–78
  - League Cup winners 1974–75
  - Alan Young Cup (Note: Played between the winners of the league title and the league cup) winners 1975–76 (shared with Taunton Town), 1977–78
- South Western League
  - Champions 1961–62, 1965–66, 1967–68, 1970–71, 1971–72, 1972–73, 1973–74, 1985–86, 1986–87, 1988–89, 1989–90, 1991–92, 1996–97, 1999–00
  - League Cup winners 1957–58, 1958–59, 1961–62, 1962–63, 1967–68, 1970–71, 1985–86, 1990–91, 1991–92, 1994–95, 1996–97, 1998–99
- South West Peninsula League
  - Premier Division West champions 2021–22
  - League Cup winners 2017–18
  - Charity Bowl winners 2018–19
  - Champions Bowl (Note: Played between the winners of the Eastern and Western divisions) winners 2021–22
- Cornwall Combination
  - Champions 1983–84
- Cornwall Senior Cup
  - Winners 1961–62, 1964–65, 1965–66, 1967–68, 1970–71, 1973–74, 1975–76, 1976–77, 1977–78, 1978–79, 1996–97, 2018–19, 2021–22, 2023–24
- Cornwall Charity Cup
  - Winners 1959–60, 1999–2000, 2002–03
- Pratten Cup
  - Winners 1973–74
- St Austell Brewery Cup
  - Winners 1989–90, 1991–92, 1993–94, 1994–95, 1995–96, 1997–98
- Aubrey Wilkes Trophy
  - Winners 1988–89, 1991–92, 1993–94, 1995–96, 2011–12, 2018–19

== Records ==
- Best FA Cup performance: First round, 1962–63, 1967–68, 1969–70.
- Best FA Trophy performance: Second round, 1977–78
- Best FA Vase performance: Quarter-finals, 1986–87, 2023–24
- Record attendance: 8,000 vs Oxford United, FA Cup, 1962–63
- Record transfer fee received: £12,000 for Tony Kellow to Exeter City in 1976
- Most appearances: Keith Manley, 581 (1970–1983)
- Most goals: Joe Scott, 205 (1972–1978)

== See also ==
- Falmouth Town A.F.C. players
- Falmouth Town A.F.C. managers
