= Cadbury Heath =

Coordinates: 51.44°N 02.49°W

- Location within Gloucestershire
- OS grid reference: ST6672
- Unitary authority: South Gloucestershire
- Ceremonial county: Gloucestershire
- Region: South West
- Country: England
- Sovereign state: United Kingdom
- Post town: BRISTOL
- Postcode district: BS30
- Police: Avon and Somerset
- Fire: Avon
- Ambulance: South Western
- UK Parliament: North East Somerset and Hanham

Cadbury Heath is a residential suburb in South Gloucestershire, England. It is in Oldland parish in the eastern fringe of the Bristol Built-up Area, 5 miles (8 km) east of Bristol city centre, and borders the neighbourhoods of Longwell Green, Oldland Common, Warmley and Kingswood.

Historically, Cadbury Heath was part of the Kingswood Forest. Much of the area was developed in the immediate post-war period as a low-rise council estate suburb, with a neighbourhood centre including a primary school, pub and community hall. The estate gained the nickname "Banjo Island" due to the layout of the streets around Park Crescent.

For elections to South Gloucestershire Council, it is in the Parkwall and Warmley electoral ward.

It is home to Cadbury Heath F.C.
