= Shirehampton F.C. =

Coordinates: 51°29′29″N 2°40′7″W

Shirehampton
- Full name: Shirehampton Football Club
- Founded: 1952; 74 years ago
- Ground: Penpole Lane, Bristol
- Chairman: Peter McCall
- League: Western League Division One
- 2025–26: Western League Division One, 15th of 20
Home colours

Shirehampton Football Club is a football club based in Bristol, England. They are currently members of the Western League Division One and play at Penpole Lane, Bristol.

== History ==
Shirehampton were formed as Kingsweston Star, changing their name to Penpole United in 1952, joining the Church of England League. In 1954, the club once again changed their name to Shirehampton Sports, whilst competing in the Bristol and District League. In the early 1970s, the club changed their name to their current guise. In 1978, Shirehampton entered the Somerset County League. In 2000, Shirehampton won the Somerset County League, winning it again in 2011 as well as the Somerset County Cup that year and 2015. In 2020, Shirehampton joined the Gloucestershire County League.

In 2022, the club was admitted into the Western League Division One. Shirehampton finished sixth in their first season at step 6 and qualified for the play-offs. After beating Wells City 3–0 in the semi-finals, they lost 2–1 to Oldland Abbotonians in the play-off final.

== Ground ==
The club currently play at Penpole Lane, in the Shirehampton area of Bristol. During the 2021–22 season, Shirehampton entered a groundsharing agreement with Bristol Manor Farm at The Creek, whilst Shirehampton undertook ground improvements at Penpole Lane.

== Records ==
- Best FA Vase performance: First qualifying round, 2023–24, 2024–25, 2025–26
