= Oldland Abbotonians F.C. =

Association football club in England

Coordinates: 51°26′26″N 2°27′59″W

Oldland Abbotonians
- Full name: Oldland Abbotonians Football Club
- Nickname: The O's
- Founded: 1910
- Ground: Aitchison Playing Field, Oldland Common
- Chairman: Clayton Woodman
- Manager: Vacant
- League: Western League Division One
- 2025–26: Western League Premier Division, 18th of 18 (voluntarily relegated)
Home colours	Away colours

Oldland Abbotonians Football Club is a semi-professional football club based in Oldland Common, South Gloucestershire, England. They are currently members of the Western League Division One and play at the Aitchison Playing Fields. The club is affiliated to the Somerset County FA and Gloucestershire County FA.

== History ==
The club was founded as St. Annes (Oldland) in 1910. The current incarnation of the club was formed from a merger between Oldland and Longwell Green Abbotonians in 1998. Oldland had played in the Gloucestershire County League on-and-off since 1974. Meanwhile, Longwell Green Abbotonians had been playing in the Somerset Senior League since 1985, winning Division One in 1993–94. In the 2022–23 Western Football League season, the O's finished fourth in the table and qualified for the playoffs, defeating Wincanton Town in the first round and subsequently defeated Shirehampton in the final, qualifying for the Premier Division.

== Current squad ==
Note: Flags indicate national team as defined under FIFA eligibility rules; some limited exceptions apply. Players may hold more than one non-FIFA nationality.

No.	Pos.	Nation	Player
1	GK	ENG	Ben Carter
2	DF	ENG	Matt Hyslop
3	DF	ENG	Jack Mills
4	DF	ENG	Jamie Symonds
5	DF	ENG	Casey Woodman
6	MF	ENG	Liam Towler
7	MF	ENG	Tom Summerhill
8	MF	ENG	Scott Robson (captain)
9	FW	ENG	Josh Dempsey
10	FW	ENG	Cash Vinall
11	MF	ENG	Harry Pruett

No.	Pos.	Nation	Player
12	FW	ENG	Owen McCallum
13	GK	GIB	Harry Victor
14	FW	ENG	Joe Beardwell
15	MF	ENG	Antonio Nurse
16	DF	ENG	Gavin Cabble
17	MF	ENG	Lucas Hart
18	DF	ENG	Russell Woodford
19	FW	ENG	Louis Hoyle
20	MF	ENG	Frank Taylor-Fox
21	MF	ENG	Wilfred Cains
22	FW	ENG	Steve Cains

== Records ==
- Best FA Cup performance: Preliminary round (2016–17, 2025–26)
- Best FA Vase performance: Second round (2021–22)
