= Gillingham Town F.C. (Dorset) =

Association football club in England

Coordinates: 51.040509°N 2.262638°W

Gillingham Town
- Full name: Gillingham Town Football Club
- Nickname: The Gills
- Founded: 1879
- Ground: Woodwater Lane, Gillingham
- Chairman: Patrick Fricker
- Manager: Paul Down
- League: Dorset Premier League
- 2025–26: Dorset Premier League, 16th of 18
Home colours	Away colours

Gillingham Town Football Club is a football club based in Gillingham, Dorset, England. Affiliated to the Dorset FA, they are currently members of the Dorset Premier League and play at Woodwater Lane. The club also has a reserve side and a women's side.

== History ==
The club was established on 14 November 1879 at the Phoenix Hotel. A successful period starting in the mid-1960s saw them win the Dorset League four times in five seasons. In 1970 they moved up to the Dorset Combination. The club finished bottom of the league in 1983–84, but avoided being relegated. In 2001–02 they won the League Cup, beating Westland Sports 2–1 in the final. They were league runners-up the following season, the first after the league was renamed the Dorset Premier League. After finishing as runners-up again in 2007–08, the club were promoted to Division One of the Western League.

In 2009–10 Gillingham won the Dorset Senior Cup, beating Wimborne Town 2–1 in the final after extra time. A third-place finish in Division One in 2011–12 saw the club promoted to the Premier Division. Despite finishing ninth in the Premier Division in 2016–17, the club resigned from the Western League and dropped back into the Dorset Premier League to concentrate on building their new ground. In 2021 they were promoted back to Division One of the Western League. The club finished bottom of Division One in 2024–25 and were relegated to the Dorset Premier League.

== Ground ==
During the late 19th century and early 20th century the club played at Chantry Fields. After World War I they relocated to a pitch on School Road, now a playing field. The club later moved to Hardings Lane after it was vacated by the Gillingham Show Society. A new clubhouse was built in 1977, and in 2005 floodlights were erected and hard standing laid on all sides of the pitch. In 2018 the club moved to a new ground on Woodwater Lane located a couple of hundred yards down the road, but still use Hardings Lane.

== Honours ==
- Dorset Senior Cup
  - Winners 2009–10
- Dorset Premier League
  - League Cup winners 2001–02

== Records ==
- Best FA Cup performance: Second qualifying round, 2009–10, 2012–13
- Best FA Vase performance: Second round, 2007–08, 2016–17
