= Nailsea & Tickenham F.C. =

Coordinates: 51°26′9″N 2°46′35″W

Nailsea & Tickenham
- Full name: Nailsea & Tickenham Football Club
- Nickname: The Swags
- Founded: 2015; 11 years ago
- Dissolved: November 2025
- Ground: JLC Ground, Nailsea
- Chairman: Robert Gregory
- Manager: Alan Smith
- 2025–26: Western League Premier Division (resigned)
Home colours	Away colours

Nailsea & Tickenham Football Club was a football club based in Nailsea, England. They were most recently members of the Western League Premier Division and played at Fryth Way, Nailsea. They resigned from the Western League in November 2025.

== History ==
In 2015, Nailsea & Tickenham were formed following a merger between Somerset County League side Nailsea Town and Weston Super Mare & District League club Tickenham United. The new club took Nailsea Town's place in the Somerset County League, finishing runners-up in their first season. In 2022, the club was admitted into the Western League Division One. That season, they finished second in the table and were promoted to the Premier Division.

In the 2024/25 season Nailsea and Tickenham reached the second qualifying round of the FA Cup after a 2-0 away victory over Hartpury, in August 2024.

== Ground ==
The club played at Fryth Way, Nailsea.

== Records ==
- Best FA Cup performance: Second qualifying round, 2024–25
- Best FA Vase performance: Second round, 2023–24
