= Oldland Common =

Coordinates: 51.4437°N 2.4697°W

- Location within Gloucestershire
- Population: 7,000
- OS grid reference: ST674717
- Civil parish: Bitton
- Unitary authority: South Gloucestershire
- Ceremonial county: Gloucestershire
- Region: South West
- Country: England
- Sovereign state: United Kingdom
- Post town: BRISTOL
- Postcode district: BS30
- Dialling code: 0117
- Police: Avon and Somerset
- Fire: Avon
- Ambulance: South Western
- UK Parliament: North East Somerset and Hanham

Oldland Common is a village in the far south region of Gloucestershire, England, on the outskirts of Bristol. It is in the civil parish of Bitton, approximately 8 miles between the centres of cities Bristol and Bath. the greater area is called Oldland

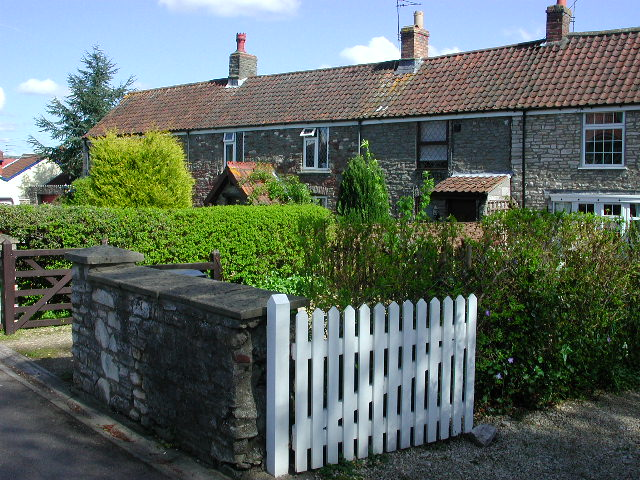
A view of a rank of cottages, High Street, Oldland Common

Oldland Common is the birthplace of the famous astronomer Sir Bernard Lovell, and is home to the Sir Bernard Lovell secondary school, a designated language college opened by Lovell himself in 1972, once attended by England cricketer Marcus Trescothick and football manager, and former Bristol Rovers FC player, Ian Holloway. Other schools in the village are St. Anne's Church of England Primary School (built in 1837 & initially called Oldland National School) and Redfield Edge Primary School.

The village lies on the Avon Valley Railway, a three-mile long heritage railway, where it is served by Oldland Common railway station. It is part of the civil parish of Bitton which has a population of approx. 9,000 (according to the 2011 Census). The village is adjacent to the villages of Bitton and Bridgeyate.

Oldland Common was first mentioned in the Domesday Book of 1086. As was common in the surrounding area, the village was involved in the coal mining industry and had its own pit on Cowhorn Hill during the 1800s. The largest employment in the late C18 and early C19 was felt hat-making - half the working population at the time of the 1841 census.

The largest place of worship in the village is St Anne's Church of England church. Its grounds contain a separate social area, the Orchard Rooms. Other local churches include the Oldland Methodist Church (shown in photograph above) and the small United Reformed Church.

The village is home to the 54th Kingswood (St Anne's) Scout Group.

On 30 October 2012, mobile phone operator EE launched their 4G signal for superfast internet in Bristol, meaning the village of Oldland Common is now connected to 4G. The 4G signal mast is situated at Redfield Hill in the village. 4G from Three, Vodafone and O2 is also now available in Oldland Common.

== Transport ==
Oldland Common is served by bus company First West of England, which operates the following services through the village;

- 19 between Bath and Bristol Parkway railway station via Kelston, Swineford, Bitton, Kingswood, Staple Hill, Downend and UWE
- 42 between Keynsham and Bristol City Centre via Cadbury Heath, Kingswood and Lawrence Hill.

The nearest rail station is Keynsham railway station, which is 2.5 miles from the village. Direct services are available to Bath Spa railway station, allowing connections to the South and London, and Bristol Temple Meads railway station, allowing connections to the South West, London, the South Coast, Wales, the Midlands, Northern England, and Scotland.

== Governance ==
An electoral ward in the name ‘Bitton and Oldland common’ exists. This stretches north from Oldland Common to Bitton and had a population of 7685 at the time of the 2011 census.

== Sport and leisure ==
Oldland is home to the non-League football clubs Oldland Abbotonians F.C. in the Western Football League and Crown & Horseshoe F.C. in the Bath and District League.

The Bristol and Bath Railway Path runs through the village, giving traffic free cycling links to the cities of bath and Bristol, taking around 40 minutes to reach each of the city centres.

== Food, Public Houses & Shopping ==
The village has two public houses: The Crown and Horseshoe, and The Dolphin. The village previously had three, the third being The Cherry Tree, which has now been converted into flats. Oldland Common also has a Village Club.

Shops in Oldland Common include a newsagent, a post office, a pharmacy and several takeaways.

== See also ==
- Oldland
