= Brislington F.C. =

Association football club in England

Coordinates: 51°25′47″N 2°31′29″W

Brislington
- Full name: Brislington Football Club
- Nicknames: Briz, The Foxes
- Founded: 1956
- Ground: Brislington Stadium, Brislington
- Capacity: 3,000 (150 seated)
- Chairman: Jack Rogers
- Manager: Josh Egan
- League: Western League Premier Division
- 2025–26: Western League Premier Division, 17th of 18
Home colours	Away colours

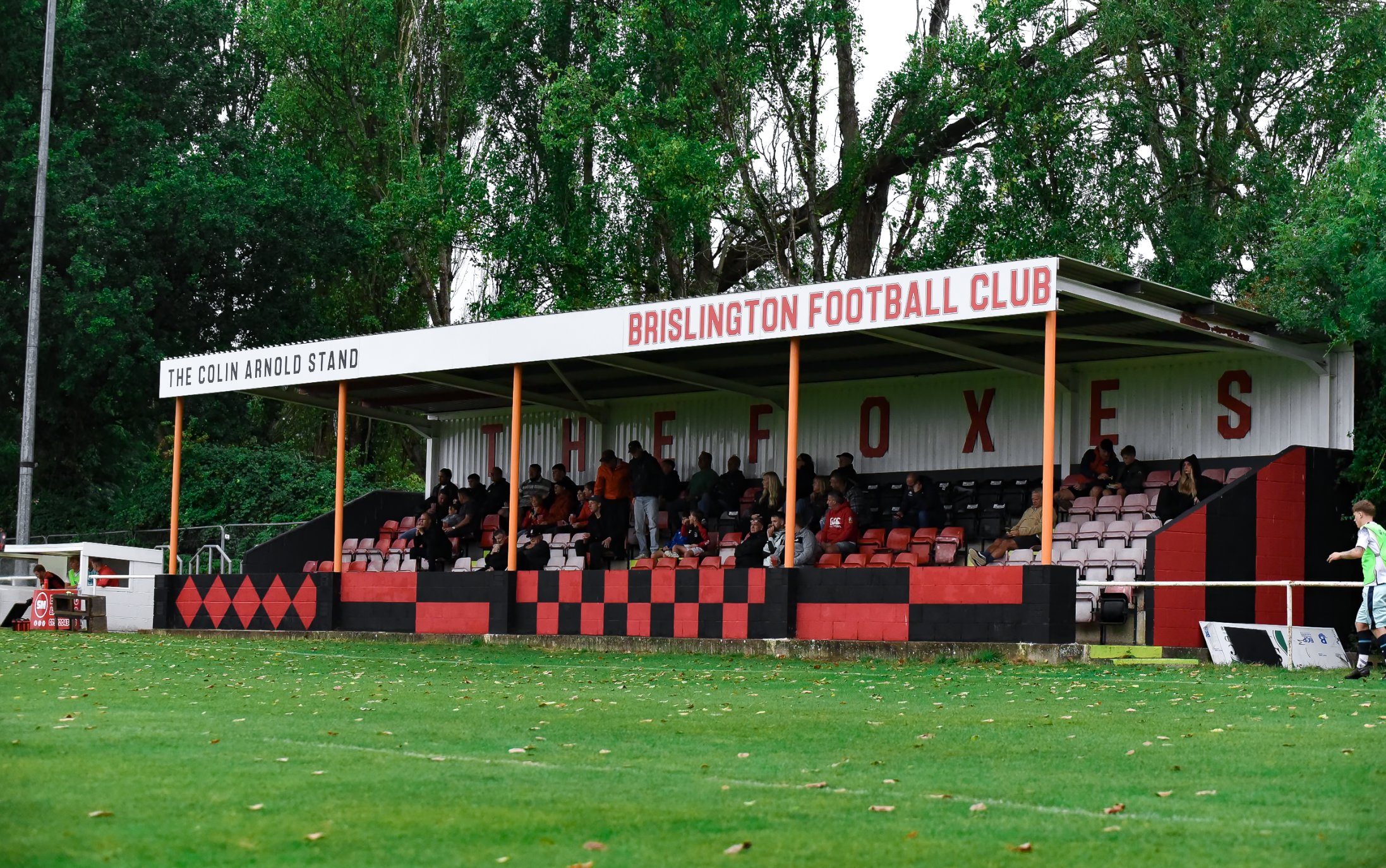
The Colin Arnold grandstand at Ironmould Lane

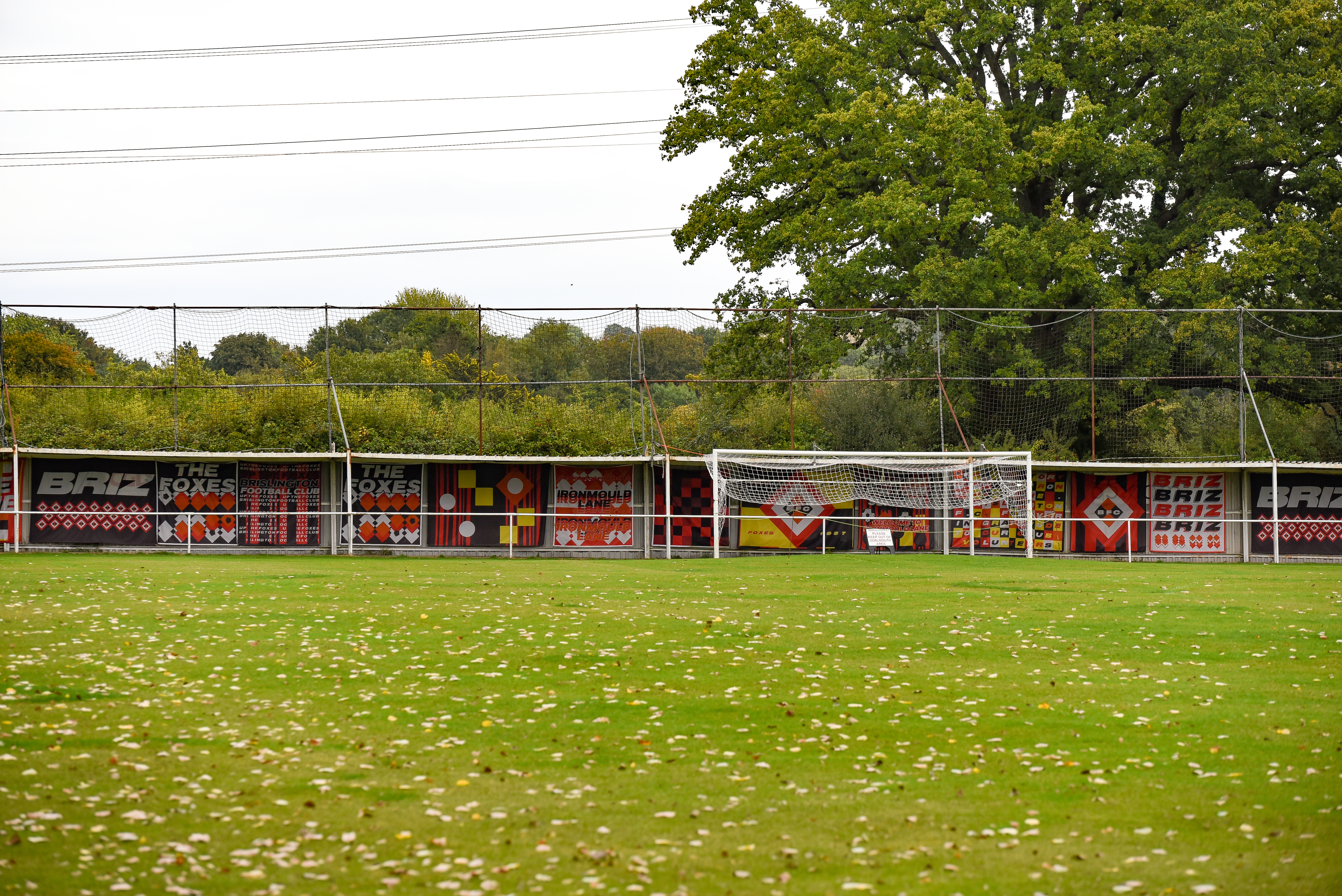
North End of Ironmould Lane

Brislington Football Club is a football club based in Brislington, in Bristol, England. Nicknamed "The Foxes", they are currently members of the Western League Premier Division and play at Ironmould Lane.

== History ==
The club was established in 1956 as an under-16 team, and initially played in the Bristol Church of England League. They won the Somerset Intermediate Cup in 1961–62 and 1962–63, and the Somerset Junior Cup in 1963–64. By 1965 the club were playing in the Senior Division of the Bristol & Suburban League, and during the 1970s they moved up to the Somerset County League. They won the League Cup in 1976–77, and finished as runners-up in the Premier Division in 1979–80, 1983–84 and 1984–85. The club went on to win the Premier Division and the Somerset Senior Cup in 1988–89, and after finishing as runners-up and winning the Senior Cup in 1990–91, they were promoted to Division One of the Western League.

Brisligton won the Somerset Senior Cup again in 1992–93, and after a third-place finish in Division One in 1993–94, they won both Division One and the Senior Cup the following season and were promoted to the Premier Division. After winning the Somerset Premier Cup in 1995–96, the club were Premier Division runners-up in 2002–03 and again in 2012–13. In 2021–22 they finished third-from-bottom of the Premier Division and were voluntarily relegated to Division One.

Brislington went on to win the Division One title in 2022–23, but were unable to be promoted due to their voluntary relegation the previous season. Although they only finished seventh in Division One in 2023–24, the club qualified for the play-offs due third-place Bitton and Cribbs reserves being ineligible. After beating Radstock Town 1–0 in the semi-finals, they defeated Wincanton Town 3–2 in the final to earn promotion back to the Premier Division.

== Ground ==
The club initially played on a pitch at Arnos Court Park. They now play at the Brislington Stadium on Ironmould Lane, which has a capacity of 3,000, including the 150-seat Colin Arnold Memorial Grandstand.

In June 2024 artist Jonathan Kelham was awarded research funding from Bath Spa University to produce a site-specific textile installation in the North End of Ironmould Lane. At the start of the 2024–25 season the club announced a three-year voluntary residency project with Kelham and graphic designer Ken Borg. These initiatives included the refurbishment of the grandstand and improvements to the turnstile entrance, alongside off-site initiatives.

== Honours ==
- Western League
  - Division One champions 1994–95, 2022–23
- Somerset County League
  - Champions 1988–89
  - League Cup winners 1976–77
- Somerset Premier Cup
  - Winners 1995–96
- Somerset Senior Cup
  - Winners 1988–89, 1990–91, 1992–93, 1994–95
- Somerset Intermediate Cup
  - Winners 1961–62, 1962–63
- Somerset Junior Cup
  - Winners 1963–64

== Records ==
- Best FA Cup performance: Fourth qualifying round, 2013–14
- Best FA Vase performance: Fourth round, 2004–05

== See also ==
- Brislington F.C. players
