= Brixham A.F.C. =

Association football club in England

Coordinates: 50°23′43″N 3°30′8″W

Brixham
- Full name: Brixham Athletic Football Club
- Nickname: The Fishermen
- Founded: 2012
- Ground: Wall Park, Brixham
- Chairman: Phil Thomas
- Manager: Tim Porter & Jason Couch
- League: Western League Premier Division
- 2025–26: Southern League Division One South, 21st of 22 (relegated)
Home colours	Away colours

Brixham A.F.C. is an English football club based in Brixham, Devon. They are currently members of the Western League Premier Division and play at Wall Park. The club's nickname is The Fishermen. The club is a FA Charter Standard Club affiliated to the Devon County Football Association.

== History ==
The club was formed in June 2012, when South Devon League clubs Brixham United and Brixham Villa merged. Brixham Villa were founded in 1953 and had previously won the league in the 2006–07 season, while Brixham United had competed in the Western Football League and FA Vase during the late 1970s.

After finishing runners up in the South Devon League, the club joined the South West Peninsula League Division One East in 2014 and spent five seasons there, finishing third in 2018–19. At the end of that season, the league was restructured, and Brixham successfully applied for promotion to the Premier Division East, at Step 6 of the National League System.

The club installed floodlights in order to comply with the conditions imposed upon them to enable their promotion to Step 6. They played their first match under floodlit conditions on 10 September 2019, a 2–1 win over Bovey Tracey.

During the 2022/23 season, Brixham achieved their greatest run in the FA Vase competition, reaching the last 16 before losing on penalties to Corsham Town FC. They completed their league success by winning every league game from mid-December 2022 all the way through to their final victory v Holsworthy FC, recording a total of 19 victories in succession.

== Ground ==
The club play their home games at Wall Park. The ground was the home of Brixham United before becoming part of AFC Brixham.

== Records ==
- Best FA Cup performance: 2nd qualifying round (2025–26)
- Best FA Trophy performance: 1st qualifying round (2025–26)
- Best FA Vase performance: 5th round (2022–23)
