= Longwell Green =

Area and electoral ward of Gloucestershire, England

Coordinates: 51.4374°N 2.4947°W

- Location within Gloucestershire
- Population: 9,890 (2021)
- OS grid reference: ST658710
- Unitary authority: South Gloucestershire
- Ceremonial county: Gloucestershire
- Region: South West
- Country: England
- Sovereign state: United Kingdom
- Post town: BRISTOL
- Postcode district: BS30
- Dialling code: 0117
- Police: Avon and Somerset
- Fire: Avon
- Ambulance: South Western
- UK Parliament: North East Somerset and Hanham

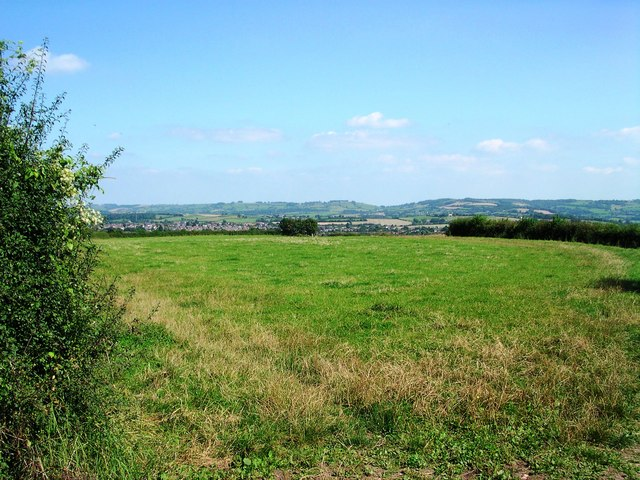
Longwell Green Easterly views towards Oldland

Longwell Green is a suburban neighbourhood and electoral ward in South Gloucestershire, England. It is part of the Bristol Built-up Area, 4 miles (6.4 km) east of the city centre of Bristol. Longwell Green takes its name from the medieval well which used to be situated on the site of the Church. It lies along the A431 Bath Road north of the River Avon.

The electoral ward is bounded by the A4174 Avon ring road to the west, the River Avon to the south, and the Siston Brook to the east, while the northern boundary with Cadbury Heath ward follows residential streets. The population of the ward at the 2021 census was 9,890, up from 6,761 at the 2011 census.

Next to the A4174 is a retail park with supermarkets and other warehouse-style retail outlets. There is a primary school, and Community Centre.

Olympic gymnast and 4 times gold medal winner, Claudia Fragapane is from Longwell Green.
