= Bishop Sutton A.F.C. =

Association football club in England

Coordinates: 51.3322°N 2.6022°W

Bishop Sutton
- Full name: Bishop Sutton Association Football Club
- Nickname: The Bishops
- Founded: 1977
- Ground: Lakeview, Bishop Sutton
- Capacity: 1,500 (100 seated)
- Chairman: George Williams
- Manager: Jon Toy
- League: Somerset County League Division Two
- 2025–26: Somerset County League Division One, 14th of 15 (relegated)
Home colours

Bishop Sutton Association Football Club is a football club based in Bishop Sutton, Somerset, England. They are currently members of the Somerset County League Division Two and play at Lakeview.

== History ==
The original Bishop Sutton football club was established in the 1900s, but folded during the war. The modern club was established in 1977 as an under-12 team and joined the Woodspring and District League. As the team aged, they progressed to under-16 football, before joining the Bristol & Avon League. In 1980–81 the club won the Somerset Junior Cup.

In 1983 Bishop Sutton moved up to the Somerset County League, joining Division One. They were Division One champions at the first attempt, earning promotion to the Premier Division. The club finished as runners-up in the Premier Division in 1989–90, and after finishing fourth the following season, they were accepted into Division One of the Western League. In 1997–98 the club won Division One and were promoted to the Premier Division. Despite finishing second-from-bottom of the league in 2006–07, they were not relegated, and went on win the Premier Division title in 2012–13. However, the club had not applied for promotion to the Southern League, and so remained in the Premier Division.

However, after Bishop Sutton won the league, manager Lee Lashenko resigned. The club subsequently finished in the bottom three of the Premier Division in 2013–14 and then finished bottom of the division the following season, resulting in relegation to Division One. They went on to finish bottom of Division One 2015–16, but were not relegated.

== Ground ==
The modern club have played at Lakeview on Wick Road since their establishment. An outbuilding belonging to the nearby Butchers Arms pub was used as changing rooms until a new changing room block was built. The ground current has a capacity of 1,500, of which 100 is seated and 200 covered.

== Honours ==
- Western League
  - Premier Division champions 2012–13
  - Division One champions 1997–98
- Somerset County League
  - Division One champions 1983–84
- Somerset Junior Cup
  - Winners 1980–81

== Records ==
- Best FA Cup performance: Second qualifying round, 2003–04
- Best FA Vase performance: Third round, 1995–96
- Record attendance: 400 vs Bristol City

== See also ==
- Bishop Sutton A.F.C. players
