= Somerset County League =

Football competition based in England

- Founded: 1890
- Country: England
- Divisions: 4
- Number of clubs: 62
- Level on pyramid: Level 11 (Premier Division)
- Feeder to: Western League
- Promotion to: Western League Division One
- Relegation to: Perry Street and District League; Taunton & District Saturday Football League; Weston-super-Mare and District Football League; Yeovil and District League
- League cup(s): Errea Premier/First Division Cup; Errea Second Division Cup
- Current champions: Nailsea United (2025–26)
- Website: Official Website

The Somerset County League is a football competition based in England. The Premier Division operates at step 7 (or level 11) of the National League System. It is a feeder to the Western League Division One and has promoted eleven clubs to it since 2006 – Hengrove Athletic, Portishead Town, Radstock Town, Oldland Abbotonians, Wells City, Cheddar, Ashton & Backwell United, Nailsea & Tickenham, Middlezoy Rovers, Mendip Broadwalk and Nailsea United.

Presently, the league has four divisions. It is fed by the Bath and North Somerset District League, the Mid-Somerset League, the Perry Street and District League, the Taunton & District Saturday League, the Yeovil and District League, and the Weston-super-Mare and District League. It is affiliated to the Somerset County FA which was formed in 1885.

== History ==
The Somerset County League, also known as the Somerset Senior League, was founded in 1890.

Seven of the current teams in the Somerset County League have competed at a higher level, namely:

- Ashton & Backwell United
- Bishop Sutton
- Chard Town
- Clevedon United
- Glastonbury
- Minehead
- Peasedown Miners Welfare

Among the clubs that have left the Somerset County League and now compete at a higher level are:

- Bishops Lydeard
- Brislington
- Bridgwater United
- Bristol Manor Farm
- Ilminster Town
- Keynsham Town
- Larkhall Athletic
- Mendip Broadwalk
- Middlezoy Rovers
- Nailsea United
- Odd Down
- Oldland Abbotonians
- Paulton Rovers
- Portishead Town
- Radstock Town
- Shepton Mallet
- Shirehampton
- Street
- Taunton Town
- Wellington
- Wells City
- Yeovil Town

Clandown had three periods in the Western Football League but rejoined the Somerset County League in 1992 before folding in 2004. Westland-Yeovil eventually folded after leaving the County League for the Western League but they subsequently reformed as Westland Sports and now compete in the Dorset Premier League. Nailsea & Tickenham also folded having been promoted to the Western League in 2022.

== 2026–27 Members ==
Premier Division

- Ashton & Backwell United
- Chard Town
- Cheddar
- Clevedon AFC
- Clevedon United
- Combe St. Nicholas
- Congresbury
- Fry Club
- Hengrove Athletic
- Portishead Town Reserves
- Sporting Weston
- Staplegrove
- Stockwood Green
- Stockwood Wanderers
- Wells City Reserves
- Yatton & Cleeve United

Division One

- Ashcott
- Burnham United
- Clutton
- Glastonbury
- Imperial
- Isle of Wedmore
- Minehead
- Nailsea United Reserves
- Paulton Rovers Sports
- Peasedown Miners Welfare
- St George Easton-in-Gordano
- Watchet Town
- Westfield
- Winscombe
- Worle
- Wrington Redhill

Division Two

- Axbridge United
- Bishop Sutton
- Broad Plain House
- Castle Cary
- Chew Magna
- Clevedon United Reserves
- Cutters Friday
- Fry Club Reserves
- Highridge United
- Hutton
- Keynsham Town Reserves
- Middlezoy Rovers Reserves
- Peasedown Albion
- Saltford
- Street Reserves

Division Three

- Banwell
- Bishops Lydeard Reserves
- Burnham United Reserves
- Cheddar Reserves
- Chilcompton Sports
- Frome Collegians
- Frome Town United
- Ilminster Town Reserves
- Radstock Town Development
- Shepton Mallet Reserves
- Swiss Valley Rangers
- Timsbury Athletic
- Tunley Athletic
- Welton Rovers Reserves
- Yatton & Cleeve United Reserves

== Premier Division Champions ==
Season	Premier Division
1983–84	Robinsons DRG
1984–85	Robinsons DRG
1985–86	Robinsons DRG
1986–87	Robinsons DRG
1987–88	Robinsons DRG
1988–89	Brislington
1989–90	Bridgwater Town
1990–91	Bridgwater Town
1991–92	Bridgwater Town
1992–93	Long Sutton
1993–94	Portishead
1994–95	Portishead
1995–96	Portishead
1996–97	Street
1997–98	Portishead
1998–99	Clevedon United
1999–2000	Shirehampton
2000–01	Shepton Mallet
2001–02	Brislington Reserves
2002–03	Nailsea United
2003–04	Team Bath Reserves
2004–05	Mangotsfield United Reserves
2005–06	Hengrove Athletic
2006–07	Burnham United
2007–08	Nailsea United
2008–09	Bridgwater Town Reserves
2009–10	Bridgwater Town Reserves
2010–11	Shirehampton
2011–12	Nailsea United
2012–13	Nailsea United
2013–14	Nailsea United
2014–15	Shirehampton
2015–16	Bishops Lydeard
2016–17	Watchet Town
2017–18	Chilcompton Sports
2018–19	Chilcompton Sports
2019–21	seasons curtailed by Covid pandemic
2021–22	Nailsea & Tickenham
2022–23	Chilcompton Sports
2023–24	Mendip Broadwalk
2024–25	Ilminster Town
2025–26	Nailsea United
