= 2026–27 Western Football League =

Western Football League
- Season: 2026–27

The 2026–27 Western Football League season (known as the 2026–27 Jewson Western Football League for sponsorship reasons) will be the 125th in the history of the Western Football League, a football competition in England. Teams are divided into two divisions: the Premier and the First.

The Premier Division (step 5) will promote two clubs; one as champions and one via a four-team play-off. The constitution was announced on 14 May 2026.

== Premier Division ==
The Premier Division was reduced from 20 clubs to 19, after Barnstaple Town and Paulton Rovers were promoted to the Southern League Division One South, Bradford Town were transferred to the Hellenic League Premier Division, A.F.C. St Austell were expelled, Nailsea & Tickenham resigned, Oldland Abbotonians took voluntary demotion to the First Division, and Helston Athletic took voluntary demotion to the South West Peninsula League Premier Division West.

Six new clubs joined the division:

- One promoted from the First Division:
  - Wells City
- One promoted from the South West Peninsula League Premier Division East:
  - Bovey Tracey
- One promoted from the South West Peninsula League Premier Division West:
  - Liskeard Athletic
- Two relegated from Southern League Division One South:
  - Brixham
  - Tavistock
- One demoted from Southern League Division One South for ground grading reasons:
  - Portishead Town

=== League table ===
Pos	Team	Pld	W	D	L	GF	GA	GD	Pts	Promotion, qualification or relegation
1	Clevedon Town	18	15	0	3	54	12	+42	45	Promotion to Southern League
2	Portishead Town	16	14	1	1	72	13	+59	43	Qualification for the play-offs
3	Bridgwater United	19	13	2	4	51	27	+24	41	Qualification for the play-offs
4	Newquay	19	12	3	4	46	17	+29	39	Qualification for the play-offs
5	St Blazey	17	11	4	2	47	21	+26	37	Qualification for the play-offs
6	Liskeard Athletic	21	12	1	8	55	37	+18	37	
7	Buckland Athletic	17	8	3	6	34	28	+6	27	
8	Torpoint Athletic	19	8	3	8	30	30	0	27	
9	Wells City	20	8	2	10	32	36	−4	26	
10	Saltash United	17	6	6	5	32	23	+9	24	
11	Tavistock	20	7	3	10	35	41	−6	24	
12	Brixham	18	7	2	9	29	29	0	23	
13	Street	18	7	1	10	29	39	−10	22	
14	Bovey Tracey	20	7	1	12	38	50	−12	22	
15	Ivybridge Town	17	7	1	9	26	40	−14	22	
16	Shepton Mallet	18	5	4	9	22	38	−16	19	
17	Sidmouth Town	19	5	3	11	29	44	−15	18	
18	Brislington	20	4	2	14	29	60	−31	14	Relegation to step 6
19	Wellington	21	0	0	21	11	116	−105	0	Relegation to step 6

Updated to match(es) played on 00:06, 15 November 2026 (UTC). Source: Western League.
Rules for classification: 1) points; 2) goal difference; 3) number of goals scored.

=== Results table ===
Home \ Away	BOV	BRW	BRS	BRX	BUC	CLE	IVY	LIS	NEW	POR	SAL	SHP	SID	STB	STR	TAV	TOR	WLG	WLS
Bovey Tracey	—																		
Bridgwater United		—																	
Brislington			—																
Brixham				—															
Buckland Athletic					—														
Clevedon Town						—													
Ivybridge Town							—												
Liskeard Athletic								—											
Newquay									—										
Portishead Town										—									
Saltash United											—								
Shepton Mallet												—							
Sidmouth Town													—						
St Blazey														—					
Street															—				
Tavistock																—			
Torpoint Athletic																	—		
Wellington																		—	
Wells City																			—

Updated to match(es) played on unknown. Source: Western League
Legend: Blue = home team win; Yellow = draw; Red = away team win.
For upcoming matches, an "a" indicates there is an article about the rivalry between the two participants.

=== Stadia and locations ===
2026–27 Western League Premier Division: Location of clubs

2026–27 Western League Premier Division: Location of clubs (Cornwall)
2026–27 Western League Premier Division: Location of clubs (Devon)

2026–27 Western League Premier Division: Location of clubs (Somerset)

Club	Location	Stadium	Capacity
Bovey Tracey	Bovey Tracey	The Western Counties Roofing Ground	3,000
Bridgwater United	Bridgwater	Fairfax Park	2,500
Brislington	Bristol	Ironmould Lane	3,000
Brixham	Brixham	Haycock Lane	2,000
Buckland Athletic	Newton Abbot	Homers Heath	1,000
Clevedon Town	Clevedon	North Somerset Community Stadium	3,900
Ivybridge Town	Ivybridge	Erme Valley	2,000
Liskeard Athletic	Liskeard	Lux Park	2,000
Newquay	Newquay	Mount Wise Stadium	5,000
Portishead Town	Portishead	Bristol Road	1,400
Saltash United	Saltash	Kimberley Stadium	1,000
Shepton Mallet	Shepton Mallet	Old Wells Road	2,500
Sidmouth Town	Sidmouth	Manstone Recreation Ground	2,500
St Blazey	St Blazey	Blaise Park	3,500
Street	Street	The Tannery Ground	1,000
Tavistock	Tavistock	Langsford Park	2,000
Torpoint Athletic	Torpoint	The Mill	1,000
Wellington	Wellington	Wellington Playing Field	1,000
Wells City	Wells	Rowdens Road	1,500

== First Division ==
The First Division is reduced from 20 clubs to 18 after Devizes Town, Sturminster Newton United and Wells City were promoted, and Cheddar and Hengrove Athletic were relegated.

Three new clubs joined the division:

- One voluntarily demoted from the Premier Division:
  - Oldland Abbotonians
- One voluntarily demoted from the Wessex League Premier Division:
  - Wincanton Town
- One promoted from the Somerset County League:
  - Nailsea United
- Clubs voluntarily demoted last season are not eligible for promotion.

=== League table ===
Pos	Team	Pld	W	D	L	GF	GA	GD	Pts	Promotion, qualification or relegation
1	Bristol Telephones	20	13	4	3	43	22	+21	43	Promotion to the Premier Division
2	AEK Boco	20	13	3	4	50	19	+31	42	Qualification for the play-offs
3	Shirehampton	20	11	1	8	52	40	+12	34	Qualification for the play-offs
4	Nailsea United	18	10	3	5	45	26	+19	33	Qualification for the play-offs
5	Warminster Town	19	10	3	6	37	19	+18	33	Qualification for the play-offs
6	Avonmouth	19	9	6	4	30	18	+12	33	
7	Longwell Green Sports	18	10	2	6	53	25	+28	32	
8	Odd Down	19	9	3	7	26	28	−2	30	
9	Almondsbury	18	8	3	7	33	40	−7	27	
10	Bitton	18	7	3	8	40	39	+1	24	
11	Cadbury Heath	19	6	5	8	28	35	−7	23	
12	Oldland Abbotonians	15	5	6	4	25	24	+1	21	
13	Keynsham Town	19	6	1	12	21	38	−17	19	
14	Radstock Town	15	4	5	6	24	32	−8	17	
15	Wincanton Town	16	5	2	9	21	33	−12	17	
16	Mendip Broadwalk	18	4	4	10	24	37	−13	16	Possible relegation to feeder leagues
17	Calne Town	18	3	5	10	18	39	−21	14	Possible relegation to feeder leagues
18	Welton Rovers	21	1	3	17	15	71	−56	6	Possible relegation to feeder leagues

Updated to match(es) played on 22:43, 21 November 2026 (UTC). Source: Western League.
Rules for classification: 1) points; 2) goal difference; 3) number of goals scored.

=== Results table ===
Home \ Away	AEK	ALM	AVO	BIT	TEL	CAD	CAL	KEY	LGS	MEN	NAI	ODD	OLD	RAD	SHI	WAR	WLT	WIN
AEK Boco	—																	
Almondsbury		—																
Avonmouth			—															
Bitton				—														
Bristol Telephones					—													
Cadbury Heath						—												
Calne Town							—											
Keynsham Town								—										
Longwell Green Sports									—									
Mendip Broadwalk										—								
Nailsea United											—							
Odd Down												—						
Oldland Abbotonians													—					
Radstock Town														—				
Shirehampton															—			
Warminster Town																—		
Welton Rovers																	—	
Wincanton Town																		—

Updated to match(es) played on unknown. Source: Western League
Legend: Blue = home team win; Yellow = draw; Red = away team win.
For upcoming matches, an "a" indicates there is an article about the rivalry between the two participants.

=== Stadia and locations ===
2026–27 Western League First Division: Location of clubs (Bristol and North-East Somerset)
2026–27 Western League First Division: Location of clubs (Wiltshire with East Somerset)

Club	Location	Stadium	Capacity
AEK Boco	Hanham	Greenbank Recreation Ground	1,000
Almondsbury	Almondsbury	The Field	
Avonmouth	Avonmouth	King George V Recreation Ground	
Bitton	Bitton	Bath Road	
Bristol Telephones	Whitchurch	BTRA Sports Ground	1,000
Cadbury Heath	Cadbury Heath	Cadbury Heath Road	
Calne Town	Calne	Bremhill View	2,500
Keynsham Town	Keynsham	AJN Stadium	3,001
Longwell Green Sports	Longwell Green	Longwell Green Community Centre	1,000
Mendip Broadwalk	Bristol	Filwood Park Playing Fields	1,000
Nailsea United	Nailsea	Grove Sports Centre	1,000
Odd Down	Bath	Lew Hill Memorial Ground	1,000
Oldland Abbotonians	Oldland Common	Aitchison Playing Field	1,000
Radstock Town	Radstock	Southfields Recreation Ground	1,250
Shirehampton	Shirehampton	Penpole Lane	1,000
Warminster Town	Warminster	Weymouth Street	1,000
Welton Rovers	Midsomer Norton	West Clewes Recreation Ground	2,400
Wincanton Town	Wincanton	Wincanton Sports Ground	1,000
