= 2021–22 Western Football League =

Western Football League
- Season: 2021–22
- Champions: Tavistock
- Promoted: Tavistock; Exmouth Town
- Relegated: Brislington; Bridport

The 2021–22 Western Football League season (known as the 2021–22 Toolstation Western Football League for sponsorship reasons) was the 120th in the history of the Western Football League, a football competition in England. Teams were divided into two divisions; the Premier and the First.

The constitution was announced on 18 May 2021.

After the abandonment of the previous two seasons due to the COVID-19 pandemic, a number of promotions were decided on a points per game basis over the 2019–20 and 2020–21 seasons.

== Premier Division ==
The Premier Division was reduced to 19 clubs from 21 after Plymouth Parkway were promoted to the Southern League, and Bradford Town, Chipping Sodbury Town, Cribbs, Hallen, Roman Glass St George and Westbury United were transferred to the Hellenic League. Odd Down requested demotion to Division One, which the league accepted.

Prior to this season, Bridgwater Town merged with women's club Yeovil United, forming Bridgwater United.

Six new clubs joined the division.

- From Division One:
  - Ashton & Backwell United
- From the South West Peninsula League Premier Division East:
  - Ilfracombe Town
  - Millbrook
- From the South West Peninsula League Premier Division West:
  - Helston Athletic
  - Mousehole
  - Saltash United

=== League table ===
Pos	Team	Pld	W	D	L	GF	GA	GD	Pts	Promotion or relegation
1	Tavistock (C, P)	36	23	8	5	96	34	+62	77	Promoted to the Southern League
2	Exmouth Town (P)	36	23	8	5	92	31	+61	77 (Note: Exmouth Town were promoted as they were one of ten runners-up at Step 5 promoted on a PPG (points per game) basis.)	Promoted to the Southern League
3	Mousehole	36	22	7	7	90	46	+44	73 (Note: Mousehole v Keynsham Town, 5 April 2022 – Keynsham did not send a team to Mousehole, and Mousehole were awarded the three points.)	
4	Saltash United	36	20	5	11	80	46	+34	65	
5	Bridgwater United	36	20	5	11	69	39	+30	65	
6	Shepton Mallet	36	17	9	10	77	36	+41	60	
7	Clevedon Town	36	16	11	9	76	54	+22	59	
8	Ilfracombe Town	36	16	8	12	62	56	+6	56	
9	Helston Athletic	36	14	12	10	67	49	+18	54	
10	Buckland Athletic	36	15	8	13	69	54	+15	53	
11	Keynsham Town	36	15	8	13	68	58	+10	53	
12	Millbrook	36	12	9	15	60	70	−10	45	
13	Bitton	36	13	6	17	64	75	−11	45	
14	Wellington	36	11	10	15	52	64	−12	43	
15	Cadbury Heath	36	10	5	21	48	81	−33	35	
16	Street	36	9	5	22	48	71	−23	32	
17	Brislington	36	9	5	22	42	95	−53	32	Voluntarily demoted to Division One (Note: Brislington requested voluntary demotion to Division One for the 2022–23 season.)
18	Ashton & Backwell United	36	7	8	21	47	80	−33	29	Reprieved from relegation (Note: Ashton & Backwell United were one of the twelve clubs with the most PPG (points per game) out of 16 second-bottom clubs at Step 5, and were reprieved from relegation.)
19	Bridport (R)	36	1	1	34	17	185	−168	4	Relegated to the South West Peninsula League

Source: Toolstation Western League.
Rules for classification: 1) points; 2) goal difference; 3) number of goals scored.
(C) Champions; (P) Promoted; (R) Relegated

=== Stadia and locations ===
Location of the clubs in the 2021–22 Western League Premier Division
Location of the clubs in the 2021–22 Western League Premier Division (Somerset)

Club	Location	Stadium	Capacity
Ashton & Backwell United	Backwell	Recreation Ground	
Bitton	Bitton	Recreation Ground	2,000
Bridgwater United	Bridgwater	Fairfax Park	2,500
Bridport	Bridport	St Mary's Field	2,000
Brislington	Bristol (Brislington)	Brislington Stadium	3,000
Buckland Athletic	Newton Abbot	Homers Heath	
Cadbury Heath	Cadbury Heath	Springfield	
Clevedon Town	Kenn	Hand Stadium	3,500
Exmouth Town	Exmouth	Southern Road	
Helston Athletic	Helston	Kellaway Park	
Ilfracombe Town	Ilfracombe	Marlborough Park	2,000
Keynsham Town	Keynsham	Crown Field	
Millbrook	Millbrook	Jenkins Park	
Mousehole	Mousehole	Trungle Parc	
Saltash United	Saltash	Kimberley Stadium	
Shepton Mallet	Shepton Mallet	The Playing Fields	2,500
Street	Street	The Tannery	1,500
Tavistock	Tavistock	Langsford Park	2,000
Wellington	Wellington	The Playing Field	1,500

== First Division ==
The First Division was increased from 20 clubs to 21 after Ashton & Backwell United were promoted to the Premier Division, and Calne Town and Corsham Town were promoted and transferred to the Hellenic League Premier Division.

Four new clubs joined:

- AEK Boco, promoted from the Gloucestershire County Football League
- Gillingham Town, promoted from the Dorset Premier Football League
- Odd Down, voluntarily demoted from the Premier Division
- Tytherington Rocks, transferred from the Hellenic Football League Division One West

=== League table ===
Pos	Team	Pld	W	D	L	GF	GA	GD	Pts	Promotion or relegation
1	Sherborne Town (C, P)	40	31	6	3	124	38	+86	99	Promoted to the Premier Division
2	Warminster Town	40	28	5	7	84	33	+51	89	Qualification for the play-offs
3	Wincanton Town	40	27	7	6	126	49	+77	88	Qualification for the play-offs
4	Welton Rovers (O, P)	40	27	7	6	90	39	+51	88	Qualification for the play-offs
5	Radstock Town	40	18	9	13	75	74	+1	63	Qualification for the play-offs
6	Cheddar	40	17	11	12	81	71	+10	62	
7	Wells City	40	16	12	12	82	69	+13	60	
8	AEK Boco	40	16	12	12	64	59	+5	60	
9	Odd Down	40	16	9	15	82	78	+4	57	
10	Oldland Abbotonians	40	17	4	19	84	84	0	55	
11	Bishop Sutton	40	15	7	18	73	70	+3	52	
12	Tytherington Rocks	40	14	10	16	60	75	−15	52	
13	Lebeq United	40	13	12	15	84	82	+2	51	
14	Gillingham Town	40	12	10	18	73	87	−14	46	
15	Hengrove Athletic	40	12	9	19	62	81	−19	45	
16	Portishead Town	40	13	7	20	55	63	−8	43 (Note: Portishead Town had three points deducted.)	
17	Longwell Green Sports	40	11	9	20	63	87	−24	42	
18	Almondsbury	40	12	2	26	54	95	−41	38	
19	Bristol Telephones	40	10	5	25	56	114	−58	35	Reprieved from relegation (Note: All third-from-bottom sides at Step 6 were reprieved from relegation, and a number of second-from-bottom sides, including Bishops Lydeard, were reprieved on a PPG (points per game) basis.)
20	Bishops Lydeard	40	6	6	28	50	98	−48	24	Reprieved from relegation
21	Devizes Town (R)	40	6	7	27	55	131	−76	22 (Note: Devizes Town had three points deducted.)	Relegated to the Wiltshire League

Source: Toolstation Western League.
Rules for classification: 1) points; 2) goal difference; 3) number of goals scored.
(C) Champions; (O) Play-off winners; (P) Promoted; (R) Relegated

=== Promotion playoffs ===
Semi-finals
2	Warminster Town	2
5	Radstock Town	0
4	Welton Rovers	2
3	Wincanton Town	0

Final
2	Warminster Town	0
4	Welton Rovers	1

==== Semifinals ====
3 May 2022	Warminster Town	2–0	Radstock Town	Warminster
19:30 GMT				Stadium: Weymouth Street

3 May 2022	Welton Rovers	2–0	Wincanton Town	Midsomer Norton
19:30 GMT	Allen; Ellis			Stadium: West Clewes; Attendance: 300

==== Final ====
7 May 2022	Warminster Town	0–1	Welton Rovers	Warminster
15:00 GMT			Garland	Stadium: Weymouth Street; Attendance: 652

- Welton Rovers were at home for their playoff semi-final as Wincanton Town were unable to host the fixture.

=== Stadia and locations ===
Location of the clubs in the 2021–22 Western League Division One
Location of the clubs in the 2021–22 Western League Division One (Bristol)
Location of the clubs in the 2021–22 Western League Division One (Gloucestershire)

Club	Location	Stadium	Capacity
AEK Boco	Bristol (Hanham)	Greenbank Road	
Almondsbury	Almondsbury	The Field	
Bishop Sutton	Bishop Sutton	Lakeview	1,500
Bishops Lydeard	Bishops Lydeard	Darby Way	
Bristol Telephones	Bristol (Stockwood)	Stockwood Lane	
Cheddar	Cheddar	Bowdens Park	
Devizes Town	Devizes	Nursteed Road	2,500
Gillingham Town	Gillingham	Woodwater Lane	
Hengrove Athletic	Bristol (Whitchurch)	Norton Lane	
Lebeq United	Almondsbury	Oaklands Park	
Longwell Green Sports	Longwell Green	Longwell Green Community Stadium	1,000
Odd Down	Bath	Lew Hill Memorial Ground	1,000
Oldland Abbotonians	Oldland Common	Aitchison Playing Field	
Portishead Town	Portishead	Bristol Road	
Radstock Town	Radstock	Southfields Recreation Ground	1,250
Sherborne Town	Sherborne	Raleigh Grove	1,150
Tytherington Rocks	Tytherington	Hardwicke Playing Field	
Warminster Town	Warminster	Weymouth Street	
Wells City	Wells	The Athletic Ground	1,500
Welton Rovers	Midsomer Norton	West Clewes	2,400
Wincanton Town	Wincanton	Wincanton Sports Ground	
