= 2017–18 Western Football League =

Western Football League
- Season: 2017–18
- Champions: Street
- Promoted: Street, Melksham Town

The 2017–18 Western Football League season (known as the 2017–18 Toolstation Western Football League for sponsorship reasons) was the 116th in the history of the Western Football League, a football competition in England. Teams are divided into two divisions; the Premier and the First.

The constitution was announced on 26 May 2017.

== Premier Division ==
The Premier Division consisted of 20 clubs, the same as last season, and featured three new clubs after Bristol Manor Farm were promoted to Southern League Division One South & West, Gillingham Town resigned from the league, and Sherborne Town were relegated to the Division One.

- Bridgwater Town, relegated from the Southern League Division One South & West.
- Hengrove Athletic, runners-up in the Division One.
- Wellington, champions of the Division One.

With the suspension of ground grading Grade E for this season and the creation of a new league at Steps 3 and 4, the champions of all Step 5 leagues were compulsorily promoted to Step 4. Of the fourteen runners-up, the twelve clubs with the best PPG (points per game ratio) were also to be compulsorily promoted, but with resignations and mergers in leagues above, all runners-up were promoted.

Teams at Step 5 without ground grading Grade F were to be relegated to Step 6, but no club in this division failed the ground grading process. All Step 5 leagues were fixed at 20 clubs for 2018–19, but in this case there were no further relegations or reprieves.

=== League table ===
| Pos | Team | Pld | W | D | L | GF | GA | GD | Pts | Promotion or relegation |
|---|---|---|---|---|---|---|---|---|---|---|
| 1 | Street (C, P) | 38 | 32 | 3 | 3 | 100 | 31 | +69 | 99 | Promotion to Southern League Division One South |
| 2 | Melksham Town (P) | 38 | 26 | 6 | 6 | 99 | 39 | +60 | 84 | Promotion to Southern League Division One South |
| 3 | Willand Rovers | 38 | 24 | 6 | 8 | 93 | 37 | +56 | 78 | |
| 4 | Bradford Town | 38 | 23 | 9 | 6 | 88 | 47 | +41 | 78 | |
| 5 | Buckland Athletic | 38 | 25 | 3 | 10 | 84 | 54 | +30 | 78 | |
| 6 | Shepton Mallet | 38 | 20 | 2 | 16 | 63 | 52 | +11 | 62 | |
| 7 | Bridport | 38 | 18 | 4 | 16 | 82 | 62 | +20 | 58 | |
| 8 | Bridgwater Town | 38 | 18 | 4 | 16 | 61 | 51 | +10 | 58 | |
| 9 | Hengrove Athletic | 38 | 16 | 8 | 14 | 73 | 60 | +13 | 56 | |
| 10 | Bitton | 38 | 14 | 11 | 13 | 58 | 66 | −8 | 53 | |
| 11 | Cribbs | 38 | 14 | 8 | 16 | 75 | 62 | +13 | 50 | |
| 12 | Clevedon Town | 38 | 13 | 8 | 17 | 56 | 63 | −7 | 47 | |
| 13 | Chipping Sodbury Town | 38 | 13 | 6 | 19 | 65 | 76 | −11 | 45 | |
| 14 | Odd Down | 38 | 12 | 8 | 18 | 55 | 62 | −7 | 44 | |
| 15 | Wellington | 38 | 12 | 6 | 20 | 52 | 73 | −21 | 42 | |
| 16 | Brislington | 38 | 10 | 10 | 18 | 51 | 71 | −20 | 40 | |
| 17 | Hallen | 38 | 8 | 10 | 20 | 44 | 80 | −36 | 34 | |
| 18 | Cadbury Heath | 38 | 8 | 8 | 22 | 62 | 115 | −53 | 32 | |
| 19 | Longwell Green Sports (R) | 38 | 5 | 5 | 28 | 33 | 111 | −78 | 20 | Relegation to the Division One |
| 20 | Wells City (R) | 38 | 3 | 7 | 28 | 33 | 115 | −82 | 12 (Note: Wells City had four points deducted for fielding an ineligible player.) | Relegation to the Division One |

Updated to match(es) played on 12 May 2018. Source:
Rules for classification: 1) points; 2) goal difference; 3) number of goals scored.
(C) Champions; (P) Promoted; (R) Relegated

=== Stadia and locations ===
| Club | Finishing position last season | Stadium |
|---|---|---|
| Bitton A.F.C | 19th | Rapid Solicitors Stadium |
| Bradford Town | 5th | Bradford on Avon Sports Club |
| Bridgwater Town | 22nd Southern League Division One South & West (relegated) | Fairfax Park |
| Bridport | 16th | St Mary's Field |
| Brislington | 10th | Brislington Stadium |
| Buckland Athletic | 4th | Kingskerswell Road |
| Cadbury Heath | 11th | Springfield |
| Chipping Sodbury Town | 13th | The Ridings |
| Clevedon Town | 14th | The Hand Stadium |
| Cribbs | 8th | The Lawns |
| Hallen | 18th | The Hallen Centre |
| Hengrove Athletic | 2nd First Division (promoted) | Norton Lane |
| Longwell Green Sports | 17th | Shellards Road |
| Melksham Town | 3rd | Eastern Way |
| Odd Down | 7th | Lew Hill Memorial Ground |
| Shepton Mallet | 12th | Playing Fields |
| Street | 2nd | The Tannery Ground |
| Wellington | 1st First Division (promoted) | The Playing Field |
| Wells City | 15th | Athletic Ground |
| Willand Rovers | 6th | Silver Street |

== First Division ==
The First Division consisted of 22 clubs, the same as the previous season, and featured two new clubs after the promotion of Hengrove Athletic and Wellington to the Premier Division:

- Bristol Telephones, promoted from the Gloucestershire County League.
- Sherborne Town, relegated from the Premier Division.

Step 6 clubs without ground grading Grade G were to be relegated to Step 7, but no club in this division failed the ground grading process. All Step 6 leagues were fixed at a maximum of 20 clubs for 2018–19, but in this case there were no further relegations or reprieves.

=== League table ===
| Pos | Team | Pld | W | D | L | GF | GA | GD | Pts | Promotion |
|---|---|---|---|---|---|---|---|---|---|---|
| 1 | Westbury United (C, P) | 42 | 28 | 11 | 3 | 97 | 29 | +68 | 95 | Promotion to the Premier Division |
| 2 | Roman Glass St George (P) | 42 | 28 | 9 | 5 | 120 | 49 | +71 | 93 | Promotion to the Premier Division |
| 3 | Keynsham Town | 42 | 27 | 8 | 7 | 120 | 62 | +58 | 89 | |
| 4 | Cheddar | 42 | 21 | 9 | 12 | 90 | 61 | +29 | 72 | |
| 5 | Devizes Town | 42 | 20 | 10 | 12 | 90 | 65 | +25 | 70 | |
| 6 | Radstock Town | 42 | 19 | 10 | 13 | 86 | 67 | +19 | 67 | |
| 7 | Oldland Abbotonians | 42 | 19 | 7 | 16 | 82 | 74 | +8 | 64 | |
| 8 | Welton Rovers | 42 | 18 | 9 | 15 | 80 | 65 | +15 | 63 | |
| 9 | Chard Town | 42 | 17 | 11 | 14 | 70 | 59 | +11 | 62 | |
| 10 | Wincanton Town | 42 | 17 | 10 | 15 | 63 | 71 | −8 | 61 | |
| 11 | Chippenham Park | 42 | 13 | 15 | 14 | 57 | 69 | −12 | 54 | |
| 12 | Bishop Sutton | 42 | 16 | 6 | 20 | 70 | 91 | −21 | 54 | |
| 13 | Almondsbury | 42 | 15 | 8 | 19 | 60 | 64 | −4 | 53 | Transferred to Hellenic League Division One West |
| 14 | Bishops Lydeard | 42 | 16 | 5 | 21 | 74 | 96 | −22 | 53 | |
| 15 | Malmesbury Victoria | 42 | 14 | 9 | 19 | 69 | 97 | −28 | 51 | Transferred to Hellenic League Division One West |
| 16 | Bristol Telephones | 42 | 14 | 8 | 20 | 74 | 98 | −24 | 50 | |
| 17 | Calne Town | 42 | 14 | 7 | 21 | 66 | 94 | −28 | 49 | |
| 18 | Ashton & Backwell United | 42 | 12 | 10 | 20 | 42 | 61 | −19 | 46 | |
| 19 | Sherborne Town | 42 | 13 | 6 | 23 | 78 | 95 | −17 | 45 | |
| 20 | Corsham Town | 42 | 10 | 9 | 23 | 43 | 71 | −28 | 39 | |
| 21 | Portishead Town | 42 | 8 | 8 | 26 | 45 | 89 | −44 | 31 (Note: Portishead Town had one point deducted.) | |
| 22 | Warminster Town | 42 | 6 | 9 | 27 | 54 | 103 | −49 | 27 | |

Updated to match(es) played on 10 May 2018. Source:
Rules for classification: 1) points; 2) goal difference; 3) number of goals scored.
(C) Champions; (P) Promoted

=== Stadia and locations ===
| Club | Finishing position last season | Stadium |
|---|---|---|
| Almondsbury | 22nd | Almondsbury Sports & Social Club |
| Ashton & Backwell United | 7th | Lancer Scott Stadium |
| Bishop Sutton | 16th | Lakeview |
| Bishops Lydeard | 6th | Cothelstone Road |
| Bristol Telephones | 1st Gloucestershire County Football League (promoted) | BTRA Sports Ground |
| Calne Town | 21st | Bremhill Road |
| Chard Town | 10th | Denning Sports Field |
| Cheddar | 3rd | Bowdens Park |
| Chippenham Park | 8th | Hardenhuish Park |
| Corsham Town | 19th | Southbank Ground |
| Devizes Town | 11th | Nursteed Road Ground |
| Keynsham Town | 4th | Crown Fields |
| Malmesbury Victoria | 9th | Flying Monk Road |
| Oldland Abbotonians | 17th | Aitchinson Playing Fields |
| Portishead Town | 14th | Bristol Road |
| Radstock Town | 5th | Southfields Recreation Ground |
| Roman Glass St George | 15th | Oaklands Park |
| Sherborne Town | 20th Western Football League Premier Division (relegated) | Raleigh Grove |
| Warminster Town | 18th | Weymouth Street |
| Welton Rovers | 20th | West Clewes |
| Westbury United | 12th | Meadow Lane |
| Wincanton Town | 13th | Wincanton Sports Ground |
