= 2018–19 Western Football League =

Western Football League
- Season: 2018–19
- Champions: Willand Rovers
- Promoted: Willand Rovers

The 2018–19 Western Football League season (known as the 2018–19 Toolstation Western Football League for sponsorship reasons) is the 117th in the history of the Western Football League, a football competition in England. Teams are divided into two divisions; the Premier and the First.

The constitution was announced on 25 May 2018.

== Premier Division ==
The Premier Division consists of 20 clubs, the same as last season, after Street and Melksham Town were promoted to Southern League Division One South & West, and Longwell Green Sports and Wells City were relegated to the First Division. Four new clubs joined:

- Plymouth Parkway, promoted from the South West Peninsula League.
- Roman Glass St George, runners-up in the First Division.
- Shortwood United, resigned from the Southern League West Division.
- Westbury United, champions of the First Division.

=== League table ===
Pos	Team	Pld	W	D	L	GF	GA	GD	Pts	Promotion or relegation
1	Willand Rovers (C, P)	38	30	5	3	116	31	+85	95	Promotion to Southern League Division One South
2	Plymouth Parkway	38	30	3	5	110	37	+73	93	
3	Bitton	38	29	5	4	112	44	+68	92	
4	Bridgwater Town	38	24	9	5	94	43	+51	81	
5	Westbury United	38	23	5	10	76	50	+26	74	
6	Clevedon Town	38	21	1	16	78	62	+16	64	
7	Bradford Town	38	17	11	10	78	55	+23	62	
8	Cribbs	38	17	9	12	71	61	+10	60	
9	Buckland Athletic	38	17	7	14	81	66	+15	58	
10	Chipping Sodbury Town	38	14	7	17	59	84	−25	49	
11	Shepton Mallet	38	15	3	20	74	83	−9	48	
12	Hallen	38	14	5	19	55	69	−14	47	
13	Bridport	38	13	5	20	64	76	−12	44	
14	Cadbury Heath	38	11	9	18	53	88	−35	42	
15	Odd Down	38	12	5	21	53	76	−23	41	
16	Wellington	38	12	3	23	55	80	−25	39	
17	Roman Glass St George	38	8	8	22	55	85	−30	32	
18	Brislington	38	9	4	25	55	84	−29	31	
19	Hengrove Athletic (R)	38	5	6	27	40	102	−62	21	Relegation to the First Division
20	Shortwood United (R)	38	1	6	31	29	132	−103	9	Relegation to Hellenic League Division One West

Updated to match(es) played on 12:42, 28 April 2019 (UTC). Source: .
Rules for classification: 1) points; 2) goal difference; 3) number of goals scored.
(C) Champions; (P) Promoted; (R) Relegated

== First Division ==
The First Division consists of 20 clubs, reduced from 22 the previous season, after Roman Glass St George and Westbury United were promoted to the Premier Division, and Almondsbury and Malmesbury Victoria were transferred to the Hellenic League Division One West. Two new clubs joined:

- Longwell Green Sports, relegated from the Premier Division.
- Wells City, relegated from the Premier Division.

=== League table ===
Pos	Team	Pld	W	D	L	GF	GA	GD	Pts	Promotion or relegation
1	Keynsham Town (C, P)	38	30	3	5	94	28	+66	93	Promotion to the Premier Division
2	Cheddar	38	26	6	6	92	38	+54	84	
3	Corsham Town	38	20	10	8	69	43	+26	70	
4	Ashton & Backwell United	38	20	5	13	62	51	+11	65	
5	Longwell Green Sports	38	19	7	12	79	67	+12	64	
6	Warminster Town	38	19	5	14	74	53	+21	62	
7	Chard Town	38	17	9	12	79	63	+16	60	Demoted due to ground grading failure
8	Calne Town	38	16	8	14	59	45	+14	56	
9	Welton Rovers	38	17	5	16	60	57	+3	56	
10	Wells City	38	16	7	15	68	61	+7	55	
11	Devizes Town	38	16	5	17	63	68	−5	53	
12	Bishops Lydeard	38	14	6	18	73	68	+5	48	
13	Sherborne Town	38	14	5	19	49	59	−10	47	
14	Wincanton Town	38	10	14	14	74	74	0	44	
15	Radstock Town	38	12	6	20	61	70	−9	42	
16	Portishead Town	38	12	4	22	59	98	−39	40	
17	Bishop Sutton	38	10	9	19	42	79	−37	39	
18	Oldland Abbotonians	38	9	8	21	50	83	−33	35	
19	Chippenham Park	38	9	7	22	53	79	−26	34	Club folded at the end of the season
20	Bristol Telephones	38	6	7	25	46	122	−76	24 (Note: Bristol Telephones had one point deducted.)	Reprieve from relegation

Updated to match(es) played on 12:49, 28 April 2019 (UTC). Source:
Rules for classification: 1) points; 2) goal difference; 3) number of goals scored.
(C) Champions; (P) Promoted

== Les Phillips Cup ==
Preliminary Round ties were played from 25 September until 2 October 2018. 16 clubs from the First Division and Premier Division, entered at this stage of the competition.

Date	Home team (tier)	Score	Away team (tier)	Att.
25/09/2018	Radstock Town (10)	1–2	Bishops Lydeard (10)	44
25/09/2018	Chipping Sodbury Town (9)	(p) 1–1	Oldland Abbotonians (10)	60
25/09/2018	Brislington (9)	3–1	Hengrove Athletic (9)	56
25/09/2018	Corsham Town (10)	(p) 2-2	Hallen A.F.C (9)	52
25/09/2018	Chippenham Park (10)	2–2 (p)	Cadbury Heath (9)	32
25/09/2018	Cheddar A.F.C (10)	2-1	Bradford Town (9)	31
26/09/2018	Bridport F.C (9)	10-0	Bristol Telephones (10)	81
02/10/2018	Bitton A.F.C (9)	0-2	Plymouth Parkway (9)	75

First Round ties were played from 30 October until 4 November 2019. All remaining clubs from the First Division and Premier Division, entered at this stage of the competition. December

Date	Home team (tier)	Score	Away team (tier)	Att.
30/10/2018	Welton Rovers (10)	1-3	Bridgwater Town (9)	-
30/10/2018	Shepton Mallet (9)	4-1	Shepton Mallet (10)	45
30/10/2018	Buckland Athletic (9)	3-0	Longwell Green Sports (10)	63
30/10/2018	Brislington F.C (9)	4-2	Warminster Town (10)	30
30/10/2018	Bishop Sutton (10)	0-2	Keynsham Town (10)	72
30/10/2018	Ashton & Backwell United (10)	2-1	Portishead Town (10)	35
30/10/2018	Chipping Sodbury Town (9)	5-0	Shortwood United (9)	45
30/10/2018	Cheddar A.F.C. (10)	0-5	Roman Glass St George (9)	37
31/10/2018	Westbury United (9)	0-3	Odd Down (Bath) (9)	-
30/10/2018	Wells City (10)	2-1	Bishops Lydeard (10)	45
30/10/2018	Chard Town (10)	1-2	Calne Town (10)	58
07/11/2018	Cadbury Heath (9)	4-3	Devizes Town (10)	48
07/11/2018	Wellington A.F.C (9)	0-2	Willand Rovers (9)	59
07/11/2018	Plymouth Parkway(9)	2-0	Cribbs F.C(9)	101
07/11/2018	Clevedon Town (9)	4-0	Bridport F.C. (9)	78
04/12/2018	Wincanton Town (10)	4-1	Corsham Town (10)	-

Third Round ties were played from 26 November 2019 until 22 January 2020.

Date	Home team (tier)	Score	Away team (tier)	Att.
27/11/2018	Keynsham Town (10)	3-2	Clevedon Town (9)	92
27/11/2018	Chipping Sodbury Town (9)	1-3	Shepton Mallet (9)	48
27/11/2018	Calne Town (10)	2-1	Wincanton Town (10)	-
27/11/2018	Bridgwater Town (9)	2-0	Roman Glass St George (9)	87
04/12/2018	Ashton & Backwell United F.C. (10)	0-3	Cadbury Heath (9)	47
05/12/2018	Willand Rovers (9)	7-1	Odd Down (Bath) (9)	53
15/01/2019	Wells City (10)	0-4	Plymouth Parkway (9)	-
26/02/2019	Brislington F.C (9)	0-0 (p)	Buckland Athletic (9)	-

Quarter Final ties were played from 5 March 2019 until 26 March 2019

Date	Home team (tier)	Score	Away team (tier)	Att.
05/03/2019	Calne Town (10)	1-3	Bridgwater Town (9)	-
06/03/2019	Plymouth Parkway (9)	2-1	Keynsham Town (10)	101
06/03/2019	Shepton Mallet (9)	2-4	Willand Rovers (9)	79
26/03/2019	Buckland Athletic (9)	P-P	Cadbury Heath (9)	82

Semi Final ties were played on 10 April 2019.

Date	Home team (tier)	Score	Away team (tier)	Att.
10/04/2019	Willand Rovers (9)	(p) 1-1	Bridgwater Town (9)	185
10/04/2019	Cadbury Heath (9)	1-4	Plymouth Parkway (9)	104

The 2018/19 Les Phillips Cup Final was played at a neutral venue. On this occasion, Raleigh Grove was selected. The home of Sherborne Town. The tie was played on 6 May 2019.

Date	Home team (tier)	Score	Away team (tier)	Att.
06/05/2019	Plymouth Parkway (9)	2-1	Willand Rovers (9)	428
