= 2013–14 Western Football League =

Western Football League
- Season: 2013–14

The 2013–14 Western Football League season (known as the 2013–14 Toolstation Western Football League for sponsorship reasons) was the 112th in the history of the Western Football League, a football competition in England. Teams were divided into two divisions; the Premier and the First.

The league champions for the second time in their history were Larkhall Athletic, who were promoted to the Southern League. The champions of Division One were Bradford Town.

== Premier Division ==
The Premier Division featured three new clubs in a league of 21, increased from 20 the previous season after Barnstaple Town and Wells City were relegated to the First Division:

- Hengrove Athletic, runners-up in Division One.
- Sherborne Town, champions of Division One.
- Slimbridge, transferred from the Hellenic League.
- Plymouth Parkway of the South West Peninsula League applied for promotion to the Western League, and the club finished in a promotion position, but they ultimately refused promotion on financial grounds.

=== Promotion applications to the Southern League ===
The four clubs that applied for promotion to Step 4 were: Brislington, Bristol Manor Farm, Hallen and Larkhall Athletic. Gillingham Town did not apply.

=== League table ===
Pos	Team	Pld	W	D	L	GF	GA	GD	Pts	Promotion or relegation
1	Larkhall Athletic (C, P)	40	34	5	1	114	33	+81	107	Promotion to Southern League Division One S&W
2	Bristol Manor Farm	40	26	8	6	104	32	+72	86	
3	Gillingham Town	40	23	7	10	87	47	+40	76	
4	Odd Down	40	22	8	10	76	45	+31	74	
5	Street	40	21	5	14	75	65	+10	68	
6	Bitton	40	19	8	13	75	58	+17	65	
7	Melksham Town	40	20	5	15	74	67	+7	65	
8	Willand Rovers	40	18	6	16	69	63	+6	60	
9	Sherborne Town	40	18	5	17	74	70	+4	59	
10	Brislington	40	16	11	13	61	59	+2	59	
11	Buckland Athletic	40	16	10	14	72	51	+21	58	
12	Bridport	40	15	8	17	78	81	−3	53	
13	Cadbury Heath	40	15	5	20	77	80	−3	50	
14	Longwell Green Sports	40	11	14	15	52	69	−17	47	
15	Slimbridge	40	12	7	21	53	70	−17	43	
16	Winterbourne United	40	13	6	21	77	104	−27	42 (Note: Winterbourne United had three points deducted for fielding an ineligible player against Sherborne Town on 20 November.)	
17	Hallen	40	11	11	18	55	75	−20	34 (Note: Hallen had ten points deducted for fielding an ineligible player in four matches: at Slimbridge on 13 August (3 pts); at Radstock Town on 3 September (1 pt); against Brislington on 11 September (3 pts); at Hengrove Athletic on 5 October (3 pts).)	
18	Ilfracombe Town	40	10	3	27	47	93	−46	33	Resigned before the 2014–15 season
19	Bishop Sutton	40	8	8	24	47	92	−45	32	
20	Radstock Town (R)	40	10	4	26	51	110	−59	31 (Note: Radstock Town had three points deducted for fielding an ineligible player against Bishop Sutton on 10 August.)	Relegation to the First Division
21	Hengrove Athletic (R)	40	8	4	28	33	87	−54	28	Relegation to the First Division

Updated to match(es) played on 5 May 2014. Source:
Rules for classification: 1) points; 2) goal difference; 3) number of goals scored.
(C) Champions; (P) Promoted; (R) Relegated

== First Division ==
The First Division featured five new clubs after Hengrove Athletic and Sherborne Town were promoted to the Premier Division, Shrewton United resigned, and Elmore transferred to the South West Peninsula League:

- Ashton & Backwell United, promoted from the Somerset County League.
- Barnstaple Town, relegated from the Premier Division.
- Chippenham Park, promoted from the Wiltshire League.
- Wells City, relegated from the Premier Division.
- Wincanton Town, promoted from the Dorset Premier League.

Clubs that applied for a transfer to this division:

- Tytherington Rocks (Hellenic League) – Transfer turned down

Other clubs that applied for promotion to this division:

- Bristol Academy (Gloucestershire County League)
- Minehead (Somerset County League)
- Tuffley Rovers (Gloucestershire County League) – Accepted into the Hellenic League

Ashton & Backwell finished third in their league, with Minehead second, but Ashton & Backwell were listed for promotion instead of Minehead in a League press release on 24 May, after Minehead failed the ground grading. Chippenham Park and Wincanton Town were also listed.

- Cribbs Friends Life F.C. changed their name to Cribbs F.C. after losing the backing of their sponsors.

=== League table ===
Pos	Team	Pld	W	D	L	GF	GA	GD	Pts	Promotion
1	Bradford Town (C, P)	42	32	6	4	143	43	+100	102	Promotion to the Premier Division
2	Shepton Mallet (P)	42	26	11	5	113	52	+61	89	Promotion to the Premier Division
3	Barnstaple Town	42	26	5	11	102	62	+40	83	
4	Wincanton Town	42	23	8	11	116	70	+46	77	
5	Cribbs	42	23	8	11	89	61	+28	77	
6	Welton Rovers	42	21	11	10	82	56	+26	74	
7	Corsham Town	42	20	10	12	62	71	−9	70	
8	Wellington	42	18	10	14	65	64	+1	64	
9	Almondsbury UWE	42	19	7	16	77	78	−1	64	
10	Chippenham Park	42	19	6	17	64	72	−8	63	
11	Devizes Town	42	19	7	16	71	72	−1	60 (Note: Devizes Town had four points deducted for fielding an ineligible player against Keynsham Town on 26 October (one point) and against Cheddar on 2 November (three points).)	
12	Roman Glass St George	42	16	5	21	78	91	−13	53	
13	Calne Town	42	14	10	18	74	70	+4	52	
14	Ashton & Backwell United	42	15	7	20	49	63	−14	52	
15	Chard Town	42	14	9	19	56	58	−2	51	
16	Wells City	42	14	8	20	63	75	−12	50	
17	Cheddar	42	12	9	21	66	92	−26	45	
18	Warminster Town	42	11	9	22	55	88	−33	42	
19	Keynsham Town	42	12	6	24	56	94	−38	42	
20	Westbury United	42	11	8	23	50	75	−25	38 (Note: Westbury United had three points deducted for fielding an ineligible player against Welton Rovers on 11 January.)	
21	Oldland Abbotonians	42	5	10	27	54	104	−50	25	
22	Portishead Town	42	5	4	33	34	108	−74	19	

Updated to match(es) played on 5 May 2014. Source:
Rules for classification: 1) points; 2) goal difference; 3) number of goals scored.
(C) Champions; (P) Promoted
