= 2019–20 Western Football League =

Western Football League
- Season: 2019–20
- Champions: none
- Promoted: none
- Relegated: none

The 2019–20 Western Football League season (known as the 2019–20 Toolstation Western Football League for sponsorship reasons) was the 118th in the history of the Western Football League, a football competition in England. Teams were divided into two divisions; the Premier and the First. The season was abandoned on 26 March 2020, due to the coronavirus pandemic.

The constitution was announced on 19 May 2019.

This season, the Premier Division champions were to be promoted to Step 4. The runners-up in this division and ten other Step 5 divisions in other leagues were to be ranked according to PPG (points per game), and the top four in that ranking would also have been promoted. The remaining seven runners-up were to compete in "winner takes all" play-offs with seven clubs finishing bottom in Step 4 leagues, the winners being placed at Step 4 and the losers at Step 5 for 2020–21. Instead, alterations at Steps 4 and 5 were delayed until 2021–22.

The bottom clubs in all 14 Step 5 divisions were to be ranked according to PPG, and the 12 lowest-ranked clubs were to be relegated to Step 6.

In Division One, the top four clubs were to be promoted to Step 5, with the bottom two liable to relegation to Step 7.

== League suspension and season abandonment ==
On 13 March 2020, on advice from the Football Association, the league announced that all Western League matches would be suspended due to the coronavirus pandemic, initially for a period of two weeks. On 16 March, the FA decided to postpone all matches across all FA Competitions until 3 April.

On 26 March 2020, the league season was formally abandoned, with all results being expunged, and no promotion or relegation taking place to, from, or between the two divisions. On 30 March 2020, sixty-six non-league clubs sent an open letter to the Football Association requesting that they reconsider their decision.

== Premier Division ==
The Premier Division consisted of 21 clubs, increased from 20 last season, after Willand Rovers were promoted to Southern League Division One South, Hengrove Athletic were relegated to the Western League First Division, and Shortwood United were relegated and transferred to Hellenic League Division One West. Four new clubs joined:

- Exmouth Town, promoted from the South West Peninsula League Premier Division.
- Keynsham Town, champions of the First Division.
- Street, resigned from the Southern League Division One South.
- Tavistock, promoted from the South West Peninsula League Premier Division.
- Initially, Chipping Sodbury Town were transferred to the Hellenic League Premier Division, but were reinstated after an appeal. The division therefore ran with 21 clubs.

=== League table at the time of abandonment ===
Pos	Team	Pld	W	D	L	GF	GA	GD	Pts
1	Tavistock	26	20	2	4	74	29	+45	62
2	Plymouth Parkway	23	19	2	2	80	21	+59	59
3	Bradford Town	22	19	1	2	69	20	+49	58
4	Hallen	29	17	6	6	64	48	+16	57
5	Exmouth Town	25	18	2	5	64	26	+38	56
6	Shepton Mallet	27	17	4	6	66	31	+35	55
7	Bitton	26	16	2	8	69	37	+32	50
8	Bridgwater Town	27	13	7	7	65	40	+25	46
9	Clevedon Town	29	12	5	12	58	62	−4	41
10	Roman Glass St George	29	12	4	13	62	47	+15	40
11	Street	30	12	4	14	61	65	−4	40
12	Westbury United	28	12	3	13	53	42	+11	39
13	Buckland Athletic	25	12	2	11	48	48	0	38
14	Keynsham Town	29	11	4	14	50	57	−7	37
15	Brislington	27	10	5	12	42	62	−20	35
16	Cribbs	27	8	3	16	37	66	−29	27
17	Cadbury Heath	30	6	7	17	34	78	−44	25
18	Chipping Sodbury Town	28	6	1	21	33	92	−59	19
19	Bridport	27	5	2	20	35	90	−55	17
20	Wellington	30	3	3	24	24	74	−50	12
21	Odd Down	28	3	1	24	26	79	−53	10

Updated to match(es) played on 22:57, 11 March 2020 (UTC). Source: .
Rules for classification: 1) points; 2) goal difference; 3) number of goals scored.

=== Stadia and locations ===
Club	Finishing position last season	Stadium
Bitton	3rd	Rapid Solicitors Stadium
Bradford Town	7th	Bradford on Avon Sports Club
Bridgwater Town	4th	Fairfax Park
Bridport	13th	St Mary's Field
Brislington	18th	Brislington Stadium
Buckland Athletic	9th	Kingskerswell Road
Cadbury Heath	14th	Springfield
Chipping Sodbury Town	10th	The Ridings
Clevedon Town	6th	The Hand Stadium
Cribbs	8th	The Lawns
Exmouth Town	2nd South West Peninsula League Premier Division (promotion)	King George V Ground
Hallen	12th	The Hallen Centre
Keynsham Town	1st Western League Division One (promotion)	Crown Fields
Odd Down	15th	Lew Hill Memorial Ground
Plymouth Parkway	2nd	Bolitho Park
Roman Glass St George	17th	Oaklands Park
Shepton Mallet	11th	Playing Fields (Shepton)
Street	8th Southern League Division One South (voluntary relegation)	The Tannery Ground
Tavistock	1st South West Peninsula League Premier Division (promotion)	Langsford Park
Wellington	16th	The Playing Field (Wellington)
Westbury United	5th	Meadow Lane

== First Division ==
The First Division also remained at 20 clubs, after Keynsham Town were promoted to the Premier Division, Chard Town were demoted for failing ground grading requirements, and Chippenham Park folded. Three new clubs joined:

- Almondsbury, transferred from Hellenic League Division One West.
- Hengrove Athletic, relegated from the Premier Division.
- Lebeq United, promoted from the Gloucestershire County Football League.

=== League table at the time of abandonment ===
Pos	Team	Pld	W	D	L	GF	GA	GD	Pts
1	Calne Town	26	18	2	6	47	21	+26	56
2	Sherborne Town	25	17	2	6	58	33	+25	53
3	Longwell Green Sports	27	16	4	7	64	38	+26	52
4	Wells City	26	15	6	5	67	30	+37	51
5	Ashton & Backwell United	26	15	6	5	42	39	+3	51
6	Radstock Town	22	14	2	6	51	30	+21	44
7	Corsham Town	26	13	3	10	44	50	−6	42
8	Wincanton Town	23	13	2	8	47	46	+1	41
9	Oldland Abbotonians	22	10	6	6	30	33	−3	36
10	Cheddar	24	10	4	10	38	37	+1	34
11	Bishops Lydeard	23	10	3	10	48	38	+10	33
12	Lebeq United	26	11	0	15	50	60	−10	33
13	Portishead Town	26	9	4	13	45	46	−1	31
14	Hengrove Athletic	25	9	4	12	24	48	−24	31
15	Almondsbury	24	8	4	12	35	40	−5	28
16	Warminster Town	24	8	2	14	41	40	+1	26
17	Welton Rovers	25	7	4	14	33	44	−11	25
18	Devizes Town	26	3	7	16	34	57	−23	16
19	Bristol Telephones	25	4	2	19	34	70	−36	14
20	Bishop Sutton	25	3	3	19	27	59	−32	12

Updated to match(es) played on 23:06, 11 March 2020 (UTC). Source: .
Rules for classification: 1) points; 2) goal difference; 3) number of goals scored.

=== Stadia and locations ===
Club	Finishing position last season	Stadium
Almondsbury	6th Hellenic Football League Division One West (transferred)	Almondsbury Sports & Social Club
Ashton & Backwell United	4th	Lancer Scott Stadium
Bishop Sutton	17th	Lakeview
Bishops Lydeard	12th	Cothelstone Road
Bristol Telephones	20th	BTRA Sports Ground
Calne Town	8th	Bremhill Road
Cheddar	2nd	Bowdens Park
Corsham Town	3rd	Southbank Ground
Devizes Town	11th	Nursteed Road Ground
Hengrove Athletic	19th Western Football League Premier Division (relegated)	Paprika Park
Lebeq United	1st Gloucestershire County League (promoted)	Oaklands Park
Longwell Green Sports	5th	Longwell Green Community Centre
Oldland Abbotonians	18th	Aitchinson Playing Fields
Portishead Town	16th	Bristol Road
Radstock Town	15th	Southfields Recreation Ground
Sherborne Town	13th	Raleigh Grove
Warminster Town	6th	Weymouth Street
Wells City	10th	Athletic Ground (Wells)
Welton Rovers	9th	West Clewes
Wincanton Town	14th	Wincanton Sports Ground

== Les Phillips Cup ==
Preliminary Round ties were played from 17 September until 25 September 2019. 18 clubs from the First Division and Premier Division, entered at this stage of the competition.

Date	Home team (tier)	Score	Away team (tier)	Att.
17/09/2019	Almondsbury (10)	1–4	Exmouth Town (9)	48
17/09/2019	Brislington (9)	1–0	Bishop Sutton (10)	69
17/09/2019	Odd Down (Bath) (9)	3–0	Lebeq United (10)	45
17/09/2019	Wincanton Town (10)	0-2	Street (9)	89
18/09/2019	Cadbury Heath (9)	1–2	Tavistock (9)	48
18/09/2019	Hengrove Athletic (10)	5-1	Bristol Telephones (10)	48
18/09/2019	Oldland Abbotonians (10)	1-2	Portishead Town (10)	30
18/09/2019	Wellington (9)	0-3	Roman Glass St George (9)	65
25/09/2019	Sherborne Town (10)	2-4	Radstock Town (10)	114

First Round ties were played from 29 October until 4 November 2019. All remaining clubs from the First Division and Premier Division, entered at this stage of the competition.

Date	Home team (tier)	Score	Away team (tier)	Att.
29/10/2019	Ashton & Backwell United (10)	3-3 (p)	Bitton (9)	64
29/10/2019	Devizes Town (10)	0-3	Hallen (9)	50
29/10/2019	Radstock Town (10)	0-3	Street (9)	66
29/10/2019	Cribbs (9)	1-0	Welton Rovers (10)	52
30/10/2019	Clevedon Town (9)	4-2	Chipping Sodbury Town (9)	72
30/10/2019	Hengrove Athletic (10)	0-4	Shepton Mallet (9)	62
30/10/2019	Roman Glass St George (9)	2-1	Bridport (9)	TBC
30/10/2019	Westbury United (9)	0-1	Longwell Green Sports (10)	44
30/10/2019	Bridgwater Town (9)	5-2	Odd Down (Bath)] (9)	72
30/10/2019	Corsham Town (10)	0-4	Wells City] (10)	41
30/10/2019	Warminster Town (10)	5-0	Portishead Town (10)	68
06/11/2019	Bishops Lydeard (10)	0-4	Keynsham Town (9)	TBC
09/11/2019	Tavistock (9)	4-0	Calne Town (10)	60
19/11/2019	Brislington (9)	1-4	Bradford Town (9)	68
19/11/2019	Buckland Athletic (9)	0-2	Cheddar (10)	64
04/12/2019	Exmouth Town (9)	4-1	Plymouth Parkway (9)	147

Second Round ties were played from 26 November 2019 until 22 January 2020.

Date	Home team (tier)	Score	Away team (tier)	Att.
26/11/2019	Hallen (9)	2-1	Street (9)	61
26/11/2019	Longwell Green Sports (10)	2-2 (p)	Warminster Town (10)	40
04/12/2019	Cheddar (10)	2-1	Cribbs (9)	TBC
10/12/2019	Wells City (10)	1-3	Bridgwater Town (9)	30
21/12/2019	Roman Glass St George (9)	(p) 2-2	Keynsham Town (9)	90
07/01/2020	Shepton Mallet (9)	1-2	Exmouth Town (9)	82
22/01/2020	Tavistock (9)	3-1	Clevedon Town (9)	86
22/01/2020	Bradford Town (9)	2-1	Bitton (9)	101

Quarter Final ties were played from 18 February 2019. Only three of the four scheduled ties took place due to the coronavirus pandemic.

Date	Home team (tier)	Score	Away team (tier)	Att.
04/02/2020	Bridgwater Town (9)	3-1	Exmouth Town (9)	85
18/02/2020	Hallen (9)	(p) 1-1	Cheddar (10)	55
19/02/2020	Roman Glass St George (9)	1-2	Bradford Town (9)	85
N/A	Tavistock (9)	P-P	Warminster Town (10)	N/A
