= Bristol and Suburban Association Football League =

Association football league in England

- Founded: 1894; 132 years ago
- Country: England
- Divisions: 6
- Number of clubs: 66
- Feeder to: Gloucestershire County League
- Promotion to: Gloucestershire County League
- Current champions: Wessex Wanderers FC (2025-26)
- Website: Official website

The Bristol and Suburban Association Football League is a football competition in England. The league has six divisions. The league is affiliated to the Gloucestershire County FA. It is one of three feeders to the Gloucestershire County League.

== History ==
The Bristol and Suburban Association Football League was formed in 1894 under the name North Bristol and District Association Football League. The inaugural meeting of the League was held on 14 September 1894, at the Phoenix Coffee Palace, which was situated in Ashley Road, Montpelier, Bristol. This meeting was attended by representatives of the following clubs who were responsible for setting up the working arrangements and funding of the new League.

- Beaufort Albion
- Bethesda
- Croft End
- Phoenix Rangers
- Rose Green
- Wanderers
- Westbourne

These seven clubs can be considered the founder members of the League and games commenced at the outset of the 1894–95 season. It was not until 1906 that the League's current name first appeared.

The following trophies are presented by the League

- Alfred Bosley Memorial Cup – first competed for in 1952–53 by clubs from selected Divisions but currently restricted to Clubs playing in the top three Divisions of the League.
- Norman Goulding Memorial Cup – competed for each season since 1984–85 by senior teams of the clubs playing in Division Two and below.
- Tom Pitts Memorial Cup – presented annually since 1984 to the club secretary who has administered the affairs of his/her club with outstanding efficiency.

Among the clubs that have left the Bristol and Suburban Association Football League and now compete at a higher level are:

- Almondsbury
- Backwell United (now known as Ashton & Backwell United)
- Brislington
- Bristol Telephones
- Clevedon (now known as Clevedon Town)
- Hengrove Athletic
- Little Stoke
- Manor Farm (now known as Bristol Manor Farm)
- Tytherington Rocks
- Winterbourne United

Greenway Sports and Almondsbury both played in the Bristol & Suburban League. Greenway Sports won the Bristol Premier Combination on a number of occasions in the early 1970s. The clubs amalgamated as Almondsbury Greenway in 1974 and reached the final of the FA Vase at Wembley Stadium in 1979, where Almondsbury Greenway were beaten by Billericay Town. The club changed its name to Almondsbury Town and in the 2010/11 season played in Southern Football League Division One South & West where they finished eighth. However, following the loss of their Oaklands Park home venue, the club dropped to the Bristol & Suburban League, and after one season back in the league, folded altogether.

== Member clubs 2025–26 ==
=== Premier Division ===
- Almondsbury Reserves
- Avonmouth Reserves
- Easton Cowboys
- Henbury & Rockleaze Reserves
- Old Cothamians
- Phoenix Next Gen
- Southmead CS Athletic
- St Aldhelms
- Stoke Gifford SGS United Reserves
- The Jamaica Bell
- Warmley Redbridge
- Wessex Wanderers

=== Senior Division ===
- AFC Bohemia
- Brislington Reserves
- Broad Plain House Reserves
- Bromley Heath United Reserves
- Cosmos
- Filton Athletic Reserves
- Fishponds Old Boys
- Hartcliffe F.C.
- Lawrence Weston Athletic
- Mendip Broadwalk Reserves
- Wessex Wanderers Reserves

=== Division One ===
- AC Moose
- AFC Westerleigh
- ~~Cutters Friday Reserves~~
- FC Union Bristol
- Henbury & Rockleaze 'A'
- Imperial Reserves
- Little Stoke 1st
- Mendip Broadwalk 'A'
- Old Cothamians Reserves
- Red Falcon
- Southmead CS Athletic Reserves
- Wessex Wanderers Reserves

=== Division Two ===
- AC Moose Reserves
- Bedminster Down Reserves
- Bristol Wanderers
- Hartcliffe FC Reserves
- Henbury & Rockleaze 'B'
- Little Stoke Reserves
- Old Georgians
- Parson Street Old Boys
- Port of Bristol
- Saltford Reserves
- Socius United
- Stoke Gifford SGS United 'A'

=== Division Three ===
- AJA Athletic
- Almondsbury 'A'
- ~~Avonmouth 'A'~~
- Bristol Phoenix
- Bromley Heath United 'A'
- Cosmos UK Reserves
- Easton Cowboys 'A'
- Hanham Abbotonians Reserves
- Phoenix NextGen Reserves
- St Aldhelms Reserves
- Wessex Wanderers Colts

=== Division Four ===
- Bristol Athletic
- ~~Bristol Phoenix Reserves~~
- Bristol Wanderers Reserves
- Eighty-One United
- Made Forever Development
- ~~Park Knowle~~
- Parson Street O.B Res
- Portishead Town Colts
- Shaftesbury Crusade 'A'
- St Vallier

== Champions ==
Season	Premier Division One	Premier Division Two	Division One	Division Two	Division Three	Division Four	Division Five	Division Six
2004–05	Teyfant Athletic	Fishponds Old Boys	Bristol Builders Supplies	Tyndalls Park Rangers	C.T.K. Southside	Hartcliffe Old Boys Reserves	Potterswood Reserves	
2005–06	St Aldhelms	Stoke Gifford	Old Georgians	C.T.K. Southside	Southmead Athletic	Potterswood Reserves	Avonmouth Rangers	
2006–07	Avonmouth	Winford P.H.	T.C. Sports	Southmead Athletic	Ashton Old Boys	Avonmouth Rangers	T.C. Sports Reserves	
2007–08	St Aldhelms	South Glos (Hambrook)	Southmead Athletic	Wessex Wanderers	Bristol Athletic	T.C. Sports Reserves	Hanham Athletic Colts	
2008–09	St Aldhelms	Southmead Athletic	Bristol Athletic	Imperial Saints	Mangotsfield United A	Lockleaze Reserves	Cartwheel Sports	
2009–10	St. Aldhelms	Bristol Athletic	Imperial Saints	Cartwheel Sports	Lebeq United	Wanderers	Mangotsfield United 'B'	
2010–11	Bristol Telephones	Little Stoke	Southmead Community; Sport Athletic Reserves	Golden Hill Sports	Lawrence Weston Reserves	Poker County UK	Whitchurch Reserves	
2011–12	Southmead Community Sport Athletic	Stoke Gifford United	Ridings Rangers Reserves	Lebeq United	Poker County UK	St. Annes Town	Downend Foresters Reserves	
2012–13	Bristol Telephones	Ridings High	AFC Mangotsfield	Stoke Rangers	AFC Hartcliffe	Downend Foresters Reserves	Cadbury Heath 'A'	Bristol Bilbao
2013–14	Little Stoke	Downend Foresters	Stoke Rangers	Old Cothamians	Bristol Bilbao	Park Knowle	North Bristol United	Sartan United Reserves
2014–15	Stoke Gifford United	St Aldhems	Bristol Bilbao	Rockleaze Rangers 'A'	North Bristol United	Lawrence Weston 'A'	Winford PH Reserves	
2015–16	Lebeq United	Bristol Bilbao	Rockleaze Rangers 'A'	Bromley Heath United	Bristol Spartak	North Bristol Trust	Kingswood	
2016–17	St Aldhelms	Fishponds Old Boys	AFC Mangotsfield Reserves	Wessex Wanderers	North Bristol Trust	Cosmos	Oldbury Reserves	
2017–18	St Aldhelms	Bromley Heath United	North Bristol United	Stoke Rangers	Bedminster Cricketers	Port of Bristol Reserves	Lawrence Weston Reserves	
2018–19	Bromley Heath United	Stoke Gifford United	Stoke Rangers	Cosmos	AFC Mangotsfield 'A'	Bristol Phoenix	Park Knowle Reserves	
2019–20	Abandoned due to Covid-19 pandemic							
2020–21	Teams divided into 11 small "Lockdown Leagues"							
2021–22	Stoke Gifford United	Broad Plain House	Stoke Gifford United Reserves	St Vallier	Rockleaze Rangers 'C'	Stokeside	Supreme Sports	
2022–23	Avonmouth	Redbridge	St Vallier	Broad Plain House Reserves	Hanham Abbotonians Reserves	Old Georgians Reserves		
2023–24	Filton Athletic	St Vallier	Broad Plain House Reserves	Wessex Wanderers Reserves	Red Falcon	Southmead Athletic Reserves		
2024–25	Broad Plain House	Avonmouth Reserves	Cosmos U.K	Red Falcon	AC Moose	Hartcliffe FC Reserves		
