= Avonmouth F.C. =

Association football club in England

Avonmouth
- Full name: Avonmouth F.C.
- Founded: 1919; 107 years ago
- Ground: King George V Recreation Ground, Avonmouth Road, Avonmouth, Bristol
- League: Western League Division One
- 2025–26: Western League Division One, 4th of 20
- Website: https://avonmouthfc.com/

Avonmouth Football Club is an English football club based in Bristol. They are currently members of the Western League Division One and play at the King George V Recreation Ground, Avonmouth Road.

== History ==
Avonmouth F.C. was formed in 1919.

After a spell in the Bristol & Suburban League Premier Division, which they won in 2022–23, Avonmouth were promoted to the Gloucestershire County League. They won the league at the first attempt, and gained promotion to the Western League Division One. Their first match at level 10 of the English football league system was an 8–2 win at Longwell Green Sports on 27 July 2024, in front of a crowd of 310.

== Records ==
- Biggest Win: 8–2 vs Longwell Green Sports, Gloucestershire County League, 27 July 2024
- Best FA Vase performance: First round, 2026–27

== Honours ==
- Bristol & Suburban League
  - Champions 2022–23
- Gloucestershire County League
  - Champions 2023–24
