= 2025–26 Western Football League =

Western Football League
- Season: 2025–26

The 2025–26 Western Football League season (known as the 2025–26 Jewson Western Football League for sponsorship reasons) was the 124th in the history of the Western Football League, a football competition in England. Teams are divided into two divisions: the Premier and the First.

The constitution was announced on 15 May 2025.

The Premier Division (step 5) will promote two clubs; one as champions and one via a four-team play-off.

== Premier Division ==
The Premier Division remained at 20 clubs after Portishead Town and Brixham were promoted to the Southern League Division One South, Ilfracombe Town were relegated to the South West Peninsula League Premier Division East, and Welton Rovers were relegated to the First Division.

Four new clubs joined the division:

- One relegated from the Southern League Division One South:
  - Helston Athletic
- One promoted from the South West Peninsula League Premier Division East:
  - Sidmouth Town
- One promoted from the South West Peninsula League Premier Division West:
  - Newquay
- One promoted from Division One
  - Bradford Town

=== League table ===
Pos	Team	Pld	W	D	L	GF	GA	GD	Pts	Promotion, qualification or relegation
1	Barnstaple Town (C, P)	34	24	5	5	79	37	+42	77	Promoted to the Southern League Division One South
2	Torpoint Athletic	34	23	7	4	66	34	+32	76	Qualified for the play-offs
3	Paulton Rovers (O, P)	34	23	6	5	89	36	+53	75	Qualified for the play-offs
4	Clevedon Town	34	24	4	6	74	31	+43	70 (Note: Clevedon Town had six points deducted for a technical administrative breach of league rules.)	Qualified for the play-offs
5	Sidmouth Town	34	19	5	10	57	41	+16	62	Qualified for the play-offs
6	Newquay	34	17	5	12	77	59	+18	56	
7	Buckland Athletic	34	15	10	9	69	50	+19	55	
8	Saltash United	34	13	6	15	54	65	−11	45	
9	Bridgwater United	34	12	6	16	50	60	−10	42	
10	Bradford Town	34	11	8	15	44	52	−8	41	Transferred to the Hellenic League Premier Division
11	Helston Athletic	34	12	4	18	51	77	−26	40 (Note: On 25 March, Helston Athletic requested voluntary demotion to the South West Peninsula League Premier Division West for the 2026–27 season. The request will be decided upon by The Football Association.)	Voluntary demotion to the South West Peninsula League Premier Division West
12	Street	34	10	9	15	59	60	−1	39	
13	Ivybridge Town	34	11	6	17	49	70	−21	39	
14	St Blazey	34	8	10	16	41	62	−21	34	
15	Wellington	34	10	6	18	53	68	−15	33 (Note: Wellington had three points deducted.)	
16	Shepton Mallet	34	7	8	19	44	70	−26	29	
17	Brislington	34	5	6	23	39	77	−38	21	
18	Oldland Abbotonians	34	4	5	25	32	78	−46	17 (Note: Following the League’s AGM, Oldland Abbotonians requested voluntary relegation to Step 6 of the Western League, with Wells City replacing them in the Premier Division.)	Voluntary demotion to the First Division
19	A.F.C. St Austell	0	0	0	0	0	0	0	0 (Note: A.F.C. St Austell were suspended from the league in late January 2026, and expelled from the league on 8 February. The league stated that St Austell had failed to comply with league rules, failed to meet their financial obligations to the league, and did not respond to concerns regarding the club's ability to fulfil their remaining fixtures. Their record of PL23 W0 D0 L23 GF9 GA144 Pts0 was later expunged.)	Expelled from the league
20	Nailsea & Tickenham	0	0	0	0	0	0	0	0 (Note: On 30 September 2025, Nailsea & Tickenham had one point deducted for fielding an ineligible player vs Shepton Mallet. On 5 November it was announced that the club had resigned from the league. Their record of PL17 W0 D2 L15 GF8 GA59 Pts1 was later expunged.)	Resigned from the league

Source: Western League.
Rules for classification: 1) points; 2) goal difference; 3) number of goals scored.
(C) Champions; (O) Play-off winners; (P) Promoted

=== Play-offs ===
Semi-finals
2	Torpoint Athletic	0
5	Sidmouth Town	2
3	Paulton Rovers	3
4	Clevedon Town	1

Final
3	Paulton Rovers	4
5	Sidmouth Town	2

==== Semifinals ====
25 April 2026	Torpoint Athletic	0–2	Sidmouth Town	Torpoint
15:00		Report	Cooper 49', Williams 69'	Stadium: The Mill; Attendance: 241

25 April 2026	Paulton Rovers	3–1	Clevedon Town	Paulton
15:00	Williams 19'. Bak 32', Osborne 76'	Report	Sloggett 30'	Stadium: First 4 Pools Stadium; Attendance: 436

==== Final ====
2 May 2026	Paulton Rovers	4–2	Sidmouth Town	Paulton
15:00	Jaiyeoba 14', Bak 45', Dancey 53', Bradley 88'		Pym 41' (pen.), 90+1'	Stadium: First 4 Pools Stadium; Attendance: 986

=== Results table ===
Home \ Away	BAR	BRA	BRW	BRS	BUC	CLV	HEL	IVY	NQY	OLD	PAU	SAL	SHP	SID	STB	STR	TOR	WEL
Barnstaple Town	—	2–0	3–1	2–1	1–2	1–0	3–1	3–1	2–1	4–1	2–0	4–0	3–1	2–1	3–3	2–2	1–1	4–1
Bradford Town	0–2	—	1–0	4–1	0–4	1–1	0–2	1–0	5–0	1–0	2–1	2–2	1–0	0–1	1–1	0–2	1–1	3–1
Bridgwater United	0–2	1–0	—	2–1	2–2	2–1	3–2	1–0	2–4	5–2	0–4	3–3	0–1	4–0	2–2	2–0	2–1	0–1
Brislington	1–4	0–4	5–3	—	2–1	0–2	0–3	2–2	1–2	2–2	0–3	3–2	1–2	0–0	0–2	0–3	1–2	2–2
Buckland Athletic	3–3	2–1	0–0	2–2	—	0–4	0–2	2–0	3–1	0–0	3–5	3–0	8–0	0–3	4–2	2–2	1–1	1–0
Clevedon Town	3–2	2–1	3–1	3–1	0–1	—	3–1	3–0	3–1	4–1	0–3	4–0	2–2	1–0	3–0	3–1	2–0	3–1
Helston Athletic	1–3	4–1	2–6	1–3	2–4	1–3	—	1–2	1–5	2–1	1–5	2–1	1–1	1–1	1–2	2–1	0–2	2–1
Ivybridge Town	0–2	3–1	3–0	1–0	0–2	1–1	5–3	—	1–7	0–0	3–3	1–3	2–0	0–3	2–1	3–1	3–3	1–3
Newquay	1–1	3–2	3–0	2–1	0–2	2–1	1–2	3–2	—	3–1	0–2	2–1	2–0	1–4	2–2	0–0	1–2	4–2
Oldland Abbotonians	0–2	2–1	0–1	1–0	1–4	0–4	1–1	2–2	1–5	—	0–2	2–3	0–3	0–2	0–2	3–0	0–2	2–3
Paulton Rovers	1–0	4–0	2–2	3–0	1–0	2–3	1–2	7–2	2–0	1–0	—	2–0	4–2	1–1	5–1	7–1	2–2	2–1
Saltash United	1–2	2–2	0–3	2–0	2–2	0–2	4–1	2–1	1–5	4–3	1–1	—	2–0	2–0	2–1	4–0	1–3	2–0
Shepton Mallet	2–3	1–2	3–0	6–4	1–4	1–2	1–1	0–1	0–3	2–0	0–2	2–3	—	1–2	1–1	2–4	1–4	2–2
Sidmouth Town	0–2	2–3	1–0	1–1	2–1	0–2	1–0	4–1	4–2	2–1	1–4	5–0	2–2	—	2–1	0–4	1–0	3–0
St Blazey	0–4	0–0	3–1	4–0	2–0	0–2	0–2	1–3	0–4	3–1	1–1	2–1	0–0	1–2	—	0–5	1–1	0–1
Street	3–0	1–1	4–1	1–0	3–3	2–2	5–0	0–1	1–1	5–1	2–4	0–2	1–1	1–3	0–0	—	1–2	1–2
Torpoint Athletic	2–1	1–1	1–0	1–0	3–1	1–0	5–0	2–1	4–3	3–1	3–1	1–0	2–1	2–0	1–0	3–1	—	1–4
Wellington	2–4	3–1	0–0	2–4	2–2	1–2	2–3	3–1	3–3	0–2	0–1	1–1	1–2	0–3	5–2	3–1	0–3	—

Source: Western League
Legend: Blue = home team win; Yellow = draw; Red = away team win.
For upcoming matches, an "a" indicates there is an article about the rivalry between the two participants.

=== Stadia and locations ===
Location of the clubs in the 2025–26 Western League Premier Division
Location of the clubs in the 2025–26 Western League Premier Division (Somerset)

Club	Location	Stadium	Capacity
AFC St Austell	St Austell	Poltair Park	6,000
Barnstaple Town	Barnstaple	Mill Road	5,000
Bradford Town	Bradford-on-Avon	Trowbridge Road	1,000
Bridgwater United	Bridgwater	Fairfax Park	2,500
Brislington	Bristol	Ironmould Lane	3,000
Buckland Athletic	Newton Abbot	Homers Heath	1,000
Clevedon Town	Clevedon	North Somerset Community Stadium	3,900
Helston Athletic	Helston	Kellaway Park	1,300
Ivybridge Town	Ivybridge	Erme Valley	2,000
Nailsea & Tickenham	Nailsea	Fryth Way	1,000
Newquay	Newquay	Mount Wise Stadium	5,000
Oldland Abbotonians	Oldland Common	Aitchison Playing Field	1,000
Paulton Rovers	Paulton	Winterfield Stadium	2,500
Saltash United	Saltash	Kimberley Stadium	1,000
Shepton Mallet	Shepton Mallet	Old Wells Road	2,500
Sidmouth Town	Sidmouth	Manstone Recreation Ground	2,500
St Blazey	St Blazey	Blaise Park	3,500
Street	Street	The Tannery Ground	1,000
Torpoint Athletic	Torpoint	The Mill	1,000
Wellington	Wellington	Wellington Playing Field	1,000

== First Division ==
The First Division was reduced to 20 clubs from 22 clubs after Bradford Town were promoted to the Premier Division; Hallen were promoted to the Hellenic League Premier Division; Cribbs Reserves were demoted after their first team was relegated, and Gillingham Town were relegated.

Two new clubs joined the division:

- One promoted from the Gloucestershire County League:
  - Almondsbury
- One relegated from the Premier Division:
  - Welton Rovers

=== League table ===
Pos	Team	Pld	W	D	L	GF	GA	GD	Pts	Promotion, qualification or relegation
1	Devizes Town (C, P)	38	26	8	4	93	27	+66	86	Promotion to the Hellenic League Premier Division
2	Sturminster Newton United (O, P)	38	26	4	8	92	35	+57	82	Qualification for the play-offs
3	Wells City (P)	38	25	4	9	103	42	+61	79 (Note: Following the league's AGM, Wells City were promoted to Step 5 after Oldland Abbotonians requested voluntary relegation to Step 6.)	Qualification for the play-offs
4	Avonmouth	38	23	10	5	70	39	+31	79	Qualification for the play-offs
5	Bristol Telephones	38	22	8	8	86	58	+28	74	Qualification for the play-offs
6	Bitton	38	20	9	9	68	53	+15	69	
7	Mendip Broadwalk	38	17	9	12	67	61	+6	60	
8	Longwell Green Sports	38	16	5	17	79	80	−1	53	
9	AEK Boco	38	14	8	16	77	70	+7	50	
10	Warminster Town	38	13	9	16	73	72	+1	48	
11	Almondsbury	38	13	8	17	56	71	−15	47	
12	Odd Down	38	13	7	18	64	76	−12	46	
13	Cadbury Heath	38	12	10	16	52	76	−24	46	
14	Calne Town	38	12	8	18	58	65	−7	44	
15	Shirehampton	38	12	8	18	59	75	−16	44	
16	Welton Rovers	38	12	4	22	57	76	−19	40	
17	Radstock Town	38	7	13	18	43	73	−30	33 (Note: Radstock Town had one point deducted)	
18	Keynsham Town	38	8	5	25	36	81	−45	29	Reprieved from relegation
19	Hengrove Athletic (R)	38	6	9	23	43	89	−46	26 (Note: Hengrove Athletic had one point deducted)	Relegated to the Somerset County League Premier Division
20	Cheddar (R)	38	5	10	23	32	89	−57	25	Relegated to the Somerset County League Premier Division

Source: Western League.
Rules for classification: 1) points; 2) goal difference; 3) number of goals scored.
(C) Champions; (O) Play-off winners; (P) Promoted; (R) Relegated

=== Play-offs ===
Semi-finals
2	Sturminster Newton United	0 (5)
5	Bristol Telephones	0 (4)
3	Wells City	0 (4)
4	Avonmouth	0(2)

Final
2	Sturminster Newton United	2 (6)
3	Wells City	2 (5)

==== Semifinals ====
21 April 2026	Sturminster Newton United	0–0 (5–4 p)	Bristol Telephones	Sturminster Newton
19:45		Report		Stadium: Barnetts Field; Attendance: 273

22 April 2026	Wells City	0–0 (4–2 p)	Avonmouth	Wells
19:30				Stadium: The Athletic Ground

==== Final ====
25 April 2026	Sturminster Newton United	2–2 (6–5 p)	Wells City	Sturminster Newton
15:00	71' (o.g.), Clarke 79'	Report	Horsey 48', Bryant 90+2'	Stadium: Barnetts Field; Attendance: 482
	Penalties
	Bevis (penalty missed); Lane-Laney (penalty scored)		Murray (penalty scored); O'Hare (penalty scored); Tait (penalty scored); Kellow (penalty scored); Oppong (penalty missed); Kelsey (penalty scored); Hurley (penalty missed)

=== Results table ===
Home \ Away	AEK	ALM	AVO	BIT	TEL	CAD	CAL	CHE	DEV	HEN	KEY	LGS	MEN	ODD	RAD	SHI	STU	WAR	WLS	WLT
AEK Boco	—	2–0	0–3	3–1	4–2	2–2	0–0	1–1	0–3	0–3	3–1	3–1	3–4	5–1	3–0	9–1	0–2	2–0	1–1	2–0
Almondsbury	2–1	—	0–2	1–0	1–3	3–2	3–1	1–2	1–3	4–0	2–0	1–3	2–3	0–2	2–0	1–2	0–4	1–1	0–0	2–0
Avonmouth	1–1	1–1	—	2–1	1–1	3–1	1–0	1–2	1–1	0–0	1–1	1–1	0–3	1–0	1–0	2–3	1–0	2–1	4–1	2–1
Bitton	2–1	4–1	1–2	—	3–1	1–2	4–2	3–2	0–0	3–1	0–0	1–0	3–0	4–3	2–2	2–2	0–4	3–3	1–0	1–4
Bristol Telephones	3–1	3–3	3–2	1–3	—	2–0	1–0	7–0	3–1	2–1	4–1	4–0	2–2	3–1	0–1	3–1	3–1	2–2	3–1	2–1
Cadbury Heath	0–1	0–0	1–8	1–1	1–1	—	2–1	2–1	0–2	5–1	1–2	1–0	1–1	4–4	1–1	3–1	1–0	1–1	1–6	2–0
Calne Town	1–3	4–1	1–1	2–3	1–1	4–0	—	3–0	0–4	2–0	2–0	0–0	2–1	1–3	1–1	3–2	0–1	4–1	0–2	2–3
Cheddar	1–1	2–2	0–1	0–3	0–0	2–2	0–3	—	0–2	1–1	2–1	1–3	0–0	0–1	1–1	0–2	1–4	0–1	2–2	4–0
Devizes Town	1–0	6–1	0–0	0–0	1–0	4–0	4–1	5–0	—	5–0	4–0	5–0	2–2	1–1	4–0	4–0	2–0	4–1	1–0	2–1
Hengrove Athletic	4–2	2–3	1–3	1–3	2–2	0–2	0–5	0–1	0–2	—	0–1	0–1	1–2	3–3	2–2	1–1	1–2	2–4	0–5	3–2
Keynsham Town	1–4	3–2	0–1	0–2	1–2	3–4	0–0	4–0	0–5	1–2	—	1–2	1–1	3–1	3–0	0–1	0–5	1–6	0–1	0–3
Longwell Green Sports	8–3	1–2	6–2	4–2	2–4	1–0	2–2	5–1	4–1	1–3	2–1	—	2–5	1–4	3–0	3–1	1–3	6–1	1–5	3–3
Mendip Broadwalk	3–3	1–0	0–2	2–0	3–2	3–0	1–3	1–0	0–2	4–1	3–0	1–1	—	2–1	6–0	2–0	1–4	1–2	2–3	1–4
Odd Down	0–4	0–3	1–2	1–1	1–3	1–4	5–1	1–1	1–3	2–0	3–0	0–3	0–1	—	1–1	6–1	2–1	1–0	2–4	4–1
Radstock Town	2–1	2–2	1–1	0–1	2–3	2–0	1–1	1–0	1–3	5–1	2–1	2–5	1–1	1–1	—	1–1	0–3	2–2	1–2	2–3
Shirehampton	4–3	1–1	0–1	0–1	1–4	2–2	5–1	5–2	1–2	2–2	1–2	4–0	4–1	1–2	1–2	—	2–0	0–3	0–0	1–0
Sturminster Newton United	1–0	2–0	1–3	1–1	5–0	1–0	1–2	2–1	2–2	1–1	0–0	5–1	1–0	4–2	3–1	2–1	—	8–1	5–2	6–1
Warminster Town	1–1	2–4	2–6	1–2	4–1	3–0	2–1	8–0	2–2	0–1	0–2	3–0	1–1	3–0	2–1	2–3	0–1	—	1–2	5–2
Wells City	6–2	4–0	0–1	1–2	3–4	5–0	4–0	7–1	3–0	4–1	5–1	2–1	6–0	4–0	4–1	2–1	0–2	1–0	—	4–0
Welton Rovers	3–2	2–3	2–3	2–3	0–1	2–3	2–1	2–0	1–0	1–1	4–0	2–1	1–2	1–2	1–0	0–0	1–4	1–1	0–1	—

Source: Western League
Legend: Blue = home team win; Yellow = draw; Red = away team win.
For upcoming matches, an "a" indicates there is an article about the rivalry between the two participants.

=== Stadia and locations ===
Location of the clubs in the 2025–26 Western League Division One (Somerset)
Location of the clubs in the 2025–26 Western League Division One (Bristol)
Location of the clubs in the 2025–26 Western League Division One (Wiltshire)

Club	Location	Stadium	Capacity
AEK Boco	Hanham	Greenbank Recreation Ground	1,000
Almondsbury	Almondsbury	The Field	
Avonmouth	Avonmouth	King George V Recreation Ground	
Bitton	Bitton	Bath Road	
Bristol Telephones	Whitchurch	BTRA Sports Ground	1,000
Cadbury Heath	Cadbury Heath	Cadbury Heath Road	
Calne Town	Calne	Bremhill View	2,500
Cheddar	Cheddar	Draycott Road	
Devizes Town	Devizes	Nursteed Road	2,500
Hengrove Athletic	Whitchurch	Norton Lane	1,000
Keynsham Town	Keynsham	AJN Stadium	3,001
Longwell Green Sports	Longwell Green	Longwell Green Community Centre	1,000
Mendip Broadwalk	Bristol	Filwood Park Playing Fields	1,000
Odd Down	Bath	Lew Hill Memorial Ground	1,000
Radstock Town	Radstock	Southfields Recreation Ground	1,250
Shirehampton	Shirehampton	Penpole Lane	1,000
Sturminster Newton United	Sturminster Newton	Barnets Field	1,000
Warminster Town	Warminster	Weymouth Street	1,000
Wells City	Wells	Athletic Ground	1,500
Welton Rovers	Midsomer Norton	West Clewes Recreation Ground	2,400
