= Ivybridge Town F.C. =

Association football club in England

Coordinates: 50°22′57″N 3°55′27″W

Ivybridge Town
- Full name: Ivybridge Town Football Club
- Nicknames: The Ivies, Green Army, The Bridgers
- Founded: 1925
- Ground: Erme Valley, Ivybridge
- Chairman: Dave Graddon
- Manager: Brad Gargett & Ben Washam
- League: Western League Premier Division
- 2025–26: Western League Premier Division, 13th of 18
Home colours	Away colours	Third colours

Ivybridge Town Football Club is a football club based in Ivybridge, Devon, England. They are currently members of the Western League Premier Division and play at Erme Valley.

== History ==
The club was established in 1925 and joined the Plymouth & District League in 1926. They later became members of the Plymouth & District Combination, which was formed by the league's merger with the Plymouth Combination League.

In 1992 Ivybridge were founder members of the Devon County League, joining from the Plymouth & District Combination. They finished bottom of the league in 1994–95 and again in 1997–98. However, a gradual improvement in performances saw them end the 2002–03 season as league runners-up. They were runners-up again the following season, also winning the league's Charity Cup. They won the Devon Premier Cup in 2004–05, and retained it the following season, in which they were also Devon County League champions. In 2007 the Devon County League merged with the South Western League to form the South West Peninsula League, with Ivybridge placed in the Premier Division.

Following league reorganisation at the end of the 2018–19 season, Ivybridge were placed in the Premier Division East. They won the division in 2023–24, earning promotion to the Premier Division of the Western League.

== Honours ==
- South West Peninsula League
  - Premier Division East champions 2023–24
- Devon County League
  - Champions 2005–06
  - Charity Shield winners 2003–04
- Devon Premier Cup
  - Winners 2004–05, 2005–06
- Throgmorton Cup
  - Winners 2000–01, 2002–03

== Records ==
- Best FA Cup performance: Preliminary round, 2024–25
- Best FA Vase performance: Second round, 2018–19, 2024–25, 2025–26

== See also ==
- Ivybridge Town F.C. players
- Ivybridge Town F.C. managers
