= Tytherington Rocks F.C. =

Association football club in England

Coordinates: 51°35′52.49″N 2°28′51.45″W

Tytherington Rocks
- Full name: Tytherington Rocks Football Club
- Nickname: The Rocks
- Founded: 1896
- Ground: Hardwicke Playing Field, Tytherington, South Gloucestershire
- Chairman: Tim Whittaker
- Manager: Steve Farr
- League: Gloucestershire County League
- 2025–26: Gloucestershire County League, 10th of 17
Home colours	Away colours

Tytherington Rocks F.C. is a football club based in Tytherington, near Thornbury, Gloucestershire, England. The club competes in the Gloucestershire County League and is affiliated to the Gloucestershire County FA.

They were formed in 1896 and later on joined the Bristol and Suburban Association Football League . They continued to fluctuate throughout the leagues until they gained the correct ground grading and won the Premier Division One in 1997–98.

They joined the Gloucestershire County League in 1998 and after five seasons won promotion, finishing second in 2003–04.

For the 2004–05 season they became members of the Hellenic Football League Division One West, the highest level the club has achieved. They won the Division One West title in the 2011–12 and 2013–14 seasons under Manager Gary Powell but the Hellenic League failed to recognise their ground improvements and did not promote them resulting in having to completely rebuild the entire squad

== History ==
=== Bristol and Suburban Association Football League (1932–1998) ===
In 1896 Tytherington Rocks F.C. was formed and later on joined The Bristol Suburban League, playing mostly in the second and third divisions until the beginning of the Second World War. Despite a shortage of kit and supplies Tytherington managed to raise a team during those years, playing in the Iron Acton & District League and later in the Wotton & District League. Ambrose Johnson was a Rock player in the 1930s and later in the 40s. He is the only one left alive from the 30s team to tell the story.

In 1944–45 the club won the League & Cup double in the Iron Acton & District League. In 1945–46 Tytherington played in the Wotton & Dursley League and finished runners-up in the league and won the Berkeley Hospital Cup, beating Chipping Sodbury 5–4 in the final at Charfield. When the Bristol & Suburban League restarted in 1947–48 the Rocks Applied and was accepted into the First Division. This gave them Senior Amateur status in the Cup Competitions and they performed very well until being eliminated by one of Bristol's top clubs Bristol St George. Rocks were leading 4–0 at half-time but eventually lost 5–4.

In 1947–48 Tytherington formed a youth team who were called the Pebbles. They played in the Gloucestershire Junior Boy's Association Football League. They played in this league until it disbanded in 1954–55. In the six years they were in the league, they reached the final of the Cup in 1952–53 but lost to Winterbourne Juniors 3–2 at Alveston. The next season they finished League Champions.

In 1948–49 Rocks were drawn home to Thornbury Town in the G.F.A Senior Amateur Cup, there were 400 spectators at the game but Rocks were firmly beaten 4–0.

Rocks struggled in the first two seasons back in the Suburban League and were relegated on both occasions, but they bounced back in 1949–50 winning promotion back to Division two after finishing runners-up to St Aldhelms.

In the early 50s Tytherington ran a Reserve side in the Stroud League but it only ran for a couple of seasons due to a lack of players. They did however reach the final of the Berkeley Hospital Cup in 1953, beating Wickwar 5–4 in extra time. This had been the second attempt to run a Reserve side; the other was before the war, when they played in the Wotton & Dursley League.

In 1956–57 Rocks reached the final of the G.F.A. Minor Cup but went down 5–1 to De-Veys at the Electricity Sports ground at St. Phillips. Through the 60s the club played most of the time in Division Three but by the end of the decade they had gradually slipped down the league to Division Five.

In 1973–74 Rocks gained promotion from Division Five when they finished runners-up to Barton Hill Rangers. The highlight of the season was beating Barton Hill 3–2 at home after having a player sent-off early in the first half. Tytherington played the next four seasons in Division Four before being relegated back to Division five in 1977–78. After a long struggle to get the facilities upgraded a new shower / toilet and storage area was eventually completed and opened for the start of the 1979–80 season. This had been a joint effort between the Football Club the Cricket Club and the Parish Council the latter providing the finance for installation of the electricity supply. This was the end of candlelight and the old tin bath for which Rocks had become famous throughout the league.

Most of the enthusiasm for the project stemmed from Ron Holpin on the practical side, Tony Hennessy on the financial side and Dave Kemp from the Cricket Club installed the plumbing. This coincided with the formation of a Reserve side that were elected to Division Seven of the Bristol & Suburban League. In 1982–83 Rocks first team were promoted to Division Four, they had finished fourth in Division five, but the league restructured their divisions and put Rocks up.

Jack Parr was appointed manager in 1983–84 and he was to transform the club, leading them to promotion from Division Four to Division One and the Rocks kicked off season 1987–88 in that division. He also took Rocks to the G.F.A. Intermediate Cup Semi-final but lost to Fishponds Athletic 5–1.

Under the management of Ron Holpin and later Mike Lee the Reserves followed with promotion in three consecutive seasons between 1985 and 1987 and reached the final of the G.F.A. Primary Cup in 1986–87 but lost 2–0 to Ibstock in extra time.

In 1987–88 saw the formation of the third team playing in Division Seven of the Bristol Suburban League. The team had been Streamside U16s the previous season and in their first season in senior football finished fourth in the division and were promoted to Division Five missing out the Sixth Division.

This season also seen the club adopt Streamside Junior Football Club and they became known as Tytherington Rocks Juniors.

In 1987 the new floodlight training area was opened; this was an area to the right of the pavilion that had been covered in brambles and was very uneven ground. It was levelled with the hire of a J.C.B. and volunteer labour from the club. It was very hard work but has been beneficial to the club throughout the years. Three ex-Rocks old boys Ted Oakey, Ted Pitt and Ambrose Johnson officially opened it.

Brian Lansdown took over the manager's job in 1988–89 and led the team into Premier Division Two. The first team hovered around mid-table for a couple of seasons, before being promoted to Premier Division One in 1993–94. The club started to improve the ground at this stage, erecting a rope around the pitch on first team match days and also provided dugouts for substitutes and managers to sit in if required. In 1994–95 the club finished third in the Premier Division and further improvements were made to the perimeter fence around the pitch in the form of steal tubing to replace the rope on three sides.

In 1996–97 Rocks finished Champions of the Bristol & Suburban Premier League and applied for promotion to the Gloucestershire County League but were rejected and this was a big disappointment to all concerned at the club.

Meanwhile, the Reserves team had been doing very well gradually climbing the league, they finished runners-up in Division Two.

With all the success on the field something needed to be done to upgrade the facilities to accommodate the higher grades of football. The outer appearance of the Pavilion remains the same, but inside there has been a transformation. A bar has appeared together with separate home and away changing facilities, which includes showers for both teams and separate changing facilities for referees both male and female. All this had to be achieved to gain entry into the Gloucestershire County League. This was achieved through the efforts of builders, plumbers, fundraisers and just plain labourers from within the club. An estimate £10,000 was spent over two years. During that time the players were still paying a £20 signing on fee and £2 a week match fee. They also erected a small stand on the halfway line for spectators to stand under in bad weather conditions.

Organisations like Nuclear Electric gave £500 towards the cost of the fencing around the playing area and Mother India Restaurant sponsored the playing kit to the tune of £600. Karly Kars took on the sponsorship of the kit for the next five seasons investing £500 a season.

1997–98 saw another successful season for all three teams all winning promotion. The First team won the Premier Division 1 of the Bristol & Suburban League for the second season running, the Reserves were Champions of Division One and the ‘A’ team were promoted from Division Five.

=== Gloucestershire County League (1998–2004) ===
The first season in the Gloucestershire County League was a struggle and a new manager Shaun Honour was appointed and in the end the club survived, finishing in sixteenth place but clear of relegation. In 1999–2000 a mid-table position was achieved. 2000–01 under the management of Mikey Jefferies the Rocks saw their best season so far, finishing fourth in the league and reaching the G.F.A. Challenge Trophy final at Oaklands Park Almondsbury. Leading 2–1 at one time against Hellenic Premier League rivals Yate Town; the Rocks conceded three goals to eventually lose 4–2. In 2001–02 they achieved fifth place in the table. Season 2003–04 under the management of Andy Mathias, the club had a very successful season in their long history. They finished runners-up in the Gloucestershire County League and were losing finalists in the League Cup Competition.

=== Hellenic Football League (2004–2021) ===
Having applied for promotion to the Hellenic League and their facilities passing the Ground Grading Criteria the club decided to take the opportunity to play at a higher level of football.

The first season 2004–05 in the Hellenic League Division 1 (West) was very successful, challenging for the title with three other teams for most of the season. The team eventually finished in fourth position after losing at home to Clanfield on the last day of the season. Nevertheless, the club's committee was very pleased with the outcome of the first season at the higher level of football.

Season 2005–06 under the new management of Jamie Burton and Barry Granger was the most successful to date finishing third in a promotion place and reaching the semi-finals of the Challenge Cup losing to Ardley United over two legs.

Season 2006/2007 was the third season in the Hellenic league and the team were striving for a top three position all season, however they finally finished 5th again under the guidance of Jamie Burton and Barry Granger.

In 2007/08 Rocks had a good start to this season maintaining a run of good form leading up to the new year, when they were in 6th position and decided to apply for promotion to the Premier League, however over the course of the remaining season they were drawing too many matches and with only four matches left the Manager Jamie Burton resigned and Barry Granger took over the reins for the remainder of the season. 'The Rocks' finally finished in eighth position.

In the 2017–18 season Tytherington finished bottom of the Hellenic League Division One West and failed to gain a single point.

=== Western League Division One (2021 - 2023) ===
In 2021 a new era was welcomed at the club as they were transferred to Division One of the Western League. The Rocks also appointed a new management team of Tiago Carreiras and Jake Edwards.

Further transformation occurred with an integration with North Bristol United FC who now compete As Tytherington Rocks Reserves in the Premier Division of Bristol and Suburban Association Football League.

=== Hellenic League Division One (2023 - 2025) ===
The Rocks were transferred laterally to the Hellenic League Division One for the 2023/24 season. Under the management team of Steve Farr and Michael Magee, the Rocks had arguably their most successful season since 2014, winning 15 of their 36 matches and finishing comfortably mid-table in 11th. Farr also led Rocks to the semi-finals of the Gloucestershire Challenge Trophy, losing 3–1 to Hellenic Premier Division side Mangotsfield United.

The club enter the 2024/25 season with a new Reserves Team playing in the Hellenic Division 2 West and a new U18 team who have entered the Western Counties U18 Floodlit League. In August 2024, Rocks won their first FA Vase tie in 10 attempts, defeating Keynsham Town 5-1 in the 1st Qualifying Round.

The end of the 2024/25 season marked 21 consecutive seasons and the final season for Tytherington Rocks at step 6 of the English Football League System, with the following record:

Played	Won	Drawn	Lost	Scored	Against	Points	GD
631	230	106	295	1070	1349	789	-279

== Honours ==
Iron Acton and District League

- 1944–1945 Champions
- 1944–1945 League Cup Winners

Wotton and District League

- 1918–1919 Champions (As Tytherington AFC)
- 1945–1946 Runners-up

Bristol and Suburban League

- 1949–1950 Division 3 Runners-up
- 1973–1974 Division 5 Runners-up
- 1983–1984 Division 3 Runners-up
- 1993–1994 Premier Division 2 Champions
- 1996–1997 Premier Division 1 Champions
- 1996–1997 Alf Bosley Memorial Cup Winners
- 1997–1998 Premier Division 1 Champions
- 1997–1998 Alf Bosley Memorial Cup Winners
- 2004–2005 Norman Goulding Memorial Cup Finalists (Reserves)

Gloucestershire County League

- 2003–2004 Runners-up
- 2003–2004 League Cup Finalists

Gloucestershire Football Association

- 1956–1957 Minor Cup Finalists
- 1981–1982 Intermediate Cup Finalists
- 1986–1987 Primary Cup Finalists (Reserves)
- 2000–2001 Challenge Trophy Finalists
- 2023–2024 Challenge Trophy Semi-finalists

Hellenic League

- 2005–2006 League Cup Semi-finalists
- 2011–2012 Division 1 West Champions
- 2012–2013 Supplementary Cup Semi-finalists
- 2013–2014 Division 1 West Champions

Other

- 1945–1946 Berkeley Hospital Cup Winners
- 1952–1953 Berkeley Hospital Cup Winners (Reserves)
- 2020–2021 Bristol Premier Sunday League Beaufort Cup Winners

== Records ==
- Highest League Position – 1st Hellenic League Division 1 West (204th in the English Football League System) (2011–2012 and 2013–2014)
- Record League Victory – 9–0 vs. Banbury United Reserves (24 March 2008), 10–1 vs. Trowbridge Town (27 December 2011)
- Record League Defeat – 0-13 vs. Malmesbury Victoria F.C. (25 August 2018)
- Winning Sequence – 8 games – 15 October 2011 to 10 December 2011
- Losing Sequence – 30 games – 8 April 2017 to 25 August 2018
- Unbeaten Sequence – 19 games – 28 September 2013 to 1 April 2014
- Record Attendance – 424 vs. Winterbourne United F. C. (28 August 2007) - Hellenic League Division 1 West

== Managerial history ==
Name	Period
(England) Shaun Honour	1998–2000
(England) Mickey Jefferies	2000–2001
(England) Andy Mathias	2001–2005
(England) Jazz Wright	2005
(England) Jamie Burton	2005–2008
(England) Barry Grainger	2008–2011
(England) Gary Powell	2011–2014
(England) Dan Gillespie	2016–2017
(England) Tawanda Kujeke	2017–2018
(England) Phil Orsborn	2018
(England) Ian Logan-Giles	2018
(England) Tim Minihane	2018-2019
(Ghana) David Doe	2019-2021
(Portugal) Tiago Carreiras	2021
(England) Jake Edwards	2021-2023
(England) Damian McManus	2023-2023
(England) Steve Farr	2023-

== Current staff ==
Position	Name
Chairman	(England) Tim Whittaker
Vice Chairman	(England) Dave Marshall
Secretary	(England) Barrie Whittaker
Treasurer	(England) Tim Whittaker
Commercial Manager	(England) Mark Thorpe
Groundsman	(England) Gareth Jones
Manager	(England) Steve Farr
Assistant manager	(England) Michael Magee

== Average attendances ==
- 2004–2005 – 54
- 2005–2006 – 56
- 2006–2007 – 59
- 2007–2008 – 73
- 2008–2009 – 59
- 2009–2010 – 52
- 2010–2011 – 60
- 2011–2012 – 65
- 2012–2013 – 55
- 2013–2014 – 64
- 2014–2015 – 44
- 2015–2016 – 38
- 2016–2017 – 32
- 2017–2018 – 28

== Previous league positions (1973–) ==
Season	League	Position	Notes
1932-33	Suburban League Division 2		
1944-45	Iron Acton League	1st	
1945-46	Wotton & Dursley League	2nd	
1947	Joined the Suburban League		
1947-48	Suburban League Division 3		
1948-49	Suburban League Division 3		
1949-50	Suburban League Division 3	2nd	Promoted
1950-51	Suburban League Division 2		
1968-69	Suburban League Division 4		
1973–74	Suburban League Division 5	2nd	Promoted
1974–75	Suburban League Division 4		
1975–76	Suburban League Division 4		
1976–77	Suburban League Division 4		
1977–78	Suburban League Division 4		Relegated
1978–79	Suburban League Division 5		
1979–80	Suburban League Division 5		
1980–81	Suburban League Division 5		
1981–82	Suburban League Division 5	4th	Promoted
1982–83	Suburban League Division 4		Promoted
1983–84	Suburban League Division 3	2nd	Promoted
1984–85	Suburban League Division 2		
1985–86	Suburban League Division 2		
1986–87	Suburban League Division 2		Promoted
1987–88	Suburban League Division 1		Promoted
1988–89	Suburban League Premier Division 2		
1989–90	Suburban League Premier Division 2		
1990–91	Suburban League Premier Division 2		
1991–92	Suburban League Premier Division 2		
1992–93	Suburban League Premier Division 2		
1993–94	Suburban League Premier Division 2	1st	Champions and Promoted
1994–95	Suburban League Premier Division 1	3rd	
1995–96	Suburban League Premier Division 1		
1996–97	Suburban League Premier Division 1	1st	Champions
1997–98	Suburban League Premier Division 1	1st	Champions and Promoted
1998	Joined the Gloucestershire County League		
1998–99	Gloucestershire County League	16th	
1999–00	Gloucestershire County League	8th	
2000–01	Gloucestershire County League	4th	
2001–02	Gloucestershire County League	9th	
2002–03	Gloucestershire County League	5th	
2003–04	Gloucestershire County League	2nd	Promoted
2004	Joined the Hellenic League		
2004–05	Hellenic League Division 1 West	4th	
2005–06	Hellenic League Division 1 West	3rd	
2006–07	Hellenic League Division 1 West	5th	
2007–08	Hellenic League Division 1 West	8th	
2008–09	Hellenic League Division 1 West	9th	
2009–10	Hellenic League Division 1 West	11th	
2010–11	Hellenic League Division 1 West	8th	
2011–12	Hellenic League Division 1 West	1st	Champions
2012–13	Hellenic League Division 1 West	3rd	
2013–14	Hellenic League Division 1 West	1st	Champions
2014–15	Hellenic League Division 1 West	15th	
2015–16	Hellenic League Division 1 West	14th	
2016–17	Hellenic League Division 1 West	15th	
2017–18	Hellenic League Division 1 West	14th	
2018–19	Hellenic League Division 1 West	11th	
2019–20	Hellenic League Division 1 West	-	Season Abandoned
2020–21	Hellenic League Division 1 West	-	Season Abandoned
2021	Transferred to the Western League		
2021–22	Western League Division 1	13th	
2022–23	Western League Division 1	20th	
2023	Transferred to the Hellenic League		
2023–24	Hellenic League Division 1	11th	
2024–25	Hellenic League Division 1	12th	
2025	Voluntary Demotion to the Gloucestershire County League		
2025–26	Gloucestershire County League		
