= AEK Boco F.C. =

Coordinates: 51°26′56″N 2°30′22″W

AEK-BOCO FC
- Full name: AEK-BOCO Football Club
- Nickname: The Bears
- Founded: 2003; 23 years ago
- Ground: Shield Pavillion Greenbank Road, Bristol
- Chairman: John Winter
- Manager: Elliott Gibbons
- League: Western League Division One
- 2025–26: Western League Division One, 9th of 20
Home colours

AEK-BOCO Football Club is a football club based in Bristol, England. They are currently members of the Western League Division One and play at Greenbank Road.

== History ==
AEK-BOCO were founded in 2003 as a result of the merger of AEK Rangers and Boco Juniors. The club later joined the Bristol Premier Combination, joining the Gloucestershire County League in 2014, finishing runners-up in their first season in the league. AEK Boco won the league in the 2015–16 season. In 2021, the club was admitted into the Western League Division One.

== Ground ==
The club currently play at Greenbank Road in Bristol.

== Records ==
- Best FA Vase performance: Second qualifying round, 2022–23, 2025-26
