= Ashton & Backwell United F.C. =

Football club based in Backwell, Somerset, England

Coordinates: 51.4127°N 2.7451°W

Ashton & Backwell United
- Full name: Ashton & Backwell United Football Club
- Nickname: The Stags
- Founded: 1911 (as Backwell United)
- Ground: Recreation Ground, Backwell
- Chairman: Phil Rex
- Manager: Nick Smart
- League: Somerset County League Premier Division
- 2025–26: Somerset County League Premier Division, 5th of 15
Home colours	Away colours

Ashton & Backwell United Football Club is a football club based in Backwell, Somerset, England. Affiliated to the Somerset FA, they are currently members of the Somerset County League Premier Division and play at the Recreation Ground.

== History ==
The club was established in 1911 as Backwell United. After playing in the Bristol Church of England League, they progressed to the Bristol & Suburban League in the 1950s. In 1970 they transferred to the Somerset County League, becoming founder members of the new Division One. After gaining promotion to the Premier Division, the club won the league title in 1977–78. They went on to win the league in four successive seasons between 1979–80 and 1982–83, also winning the inaugural League Cup in 1982–83.

Backwell moved up to Division One of the Western League in 1983. They were Division One runners-up in 1989–90, but were unable to take promotion as they did not have floodlights. However, after lights were installed, they finished third in 1994–95 and were promoted to the Premier Division. They remained in the Premier Division until finishing bottom of the table in 2005–06, resulting in relegation to Division One. After finishing third-from-bottom of Division One in 2007–08, the club dropped back into the Premier Division of the Somerset County League.

In 2010 Backwell United merged with Ashton Boys and were renamed Ashton & Backwell United. A third-place finish in 2012–13 saw the club promoted back to Division One of the Western League. In 2021 they were promoted to the Premier Division based on their results in the abandoned 2019–20 and 2020–21 seasons. However, they resigned from the Western League during the 2022–23 season, dropping into Division One of the Somerset County League.

== Ground ==
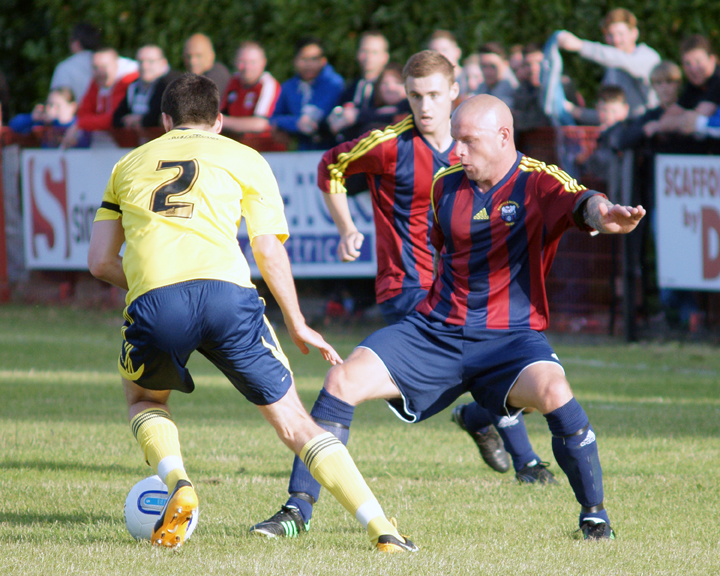
Ashton & Backwell United playing Bristol City in July 2013

The club played at several local grounds until moving to the Recreation Ground in 1947. The land had been donated to the village by Theodore Robinson during the 1980s. New changing rooms were built after the club joined the Somerset County League in 1970. A clubhouse was built during the club's early years in the Western League, which has some terracing in front of it. Floodlights were erected in 1993 alongside another set of new changing rooms, which included a roof overhang to provide covered accommodation for spectators. A stand was built during the 2003–04 season and named after Bill Coggins, a former club secretary.

== Honours ==
- Somerset County League
  - Premier Division champions 1977–78, 1979–80, 1980–81, 1981–82, 1982–83
  - League Cup winners 1982–83

== Records ==
- Best FA Cup performance: Third qualifying round, 1999–2000
- Best FA Vase performance: Fifth round, 2004–05
- Record attendance: 1,000 vs Bristol City, friendly match, 3 July 2013

== See also ==
- Ashton & Backwell United F.C. players
