= Hengrove Athletic F.C. =

Association football club in England

Coordinates: 51°23′43″N 2°33′25″W

Hengrove Athletic
- Full name: Hengrove Athletic Football Club
- Nicknames: The Grove, The Greens, The Green Giants
- Founded: 1948
- Ground: Norton Lane, Whitchurch
- Chairman: Mike Greatbanks
- Manager: Jamie Hillman
- League: Somerset County League Premier Division
- 2025–26: Western League Division One, 19th of 20 (relegated)
Home colours	Away colours

Hengrove Athletic Football Club is a football club based in the Bristol suburb of Hengrove. Affiliated to the Somerset County FA, they are currently members of the Somerset County League Premier Division and play at Norton Lane in Whitchurch.

== History ==
The club was established in 1948 by recently demobilised soldiers. The club's green shirts were created by a player's mother dyeing white shirts green, the only colouring available at the time. The new club joined Division Three of the Bristol & Suburban League, and won the league's Alf Bosley Cup in 1958–59 and again in 1963–64.

In 1974 Hengrove moved up to the Somerset County League in 1974–75. By the end of the 1970s they had reached the Premier Division, and in 1979–80 the club won both the League Cup and the Somerset Senior Cup. In 1989–90 they finished bottom of the Premier Division and were relegated to Division One. They returned to the Premier Division at the end of the 1995–96 season after a third-place finish in Division One. Hengrove finished in the bottom three of the Premier Division in 1998–99 and were relegated back to Division One. They were subsequently Division One runners-up in 2003–04, earning promotion to the Premier Division. In 2005–06 the club won the Premier Division title and were promoted to Division One of the Western League.

Hengrove were Division One runners-up in 2012–13, resulting in promotion to the Western League Premier Division. However, the club were relegated after a single season, having finished bottom of the division. In 2015–16 Hengrove won the league's Les Phillips Cup. The following season saw them finish as Division One runners-up, earning promotion back to the Premier Division. In 2018–19 the club finished second-from-bottom of the Premier Division and were relegated back to Division One.

== Ground ==
The club moved to Norton Lane in 1964, with the ground officially opened on 7 June that year. A new stand was built and floodlights were erected during the 2007–08 season, with a second stand constructed in the 2012–13 season.

== Honours ==
- Western League
  - Les Phillips Cup winners 2015–16
- Somerset County League
  - Premier Division champions 2005–06
  - League Cup winners 1979–80
- Somerset Senior Cup
  - Winners 1979–80, 1983–84
- Bristol & Suburban League
  - Alf Bosley Cup winners 1958–59, 1963–64

== Records ==
- Best FA Cup performance: Preliminary round, 2012–13, 2017–18
- Best FA Vase performance: Third round, 2015–16
