= Bradford Town F.C. =

Association football club in Wiltshire, England

Coordinates: 51°20′21.851″N 2°14′37.781″W

Bradford Town
- Full name: Bradford Town Football Club
- Nicknames: Bobcats, The Town
- Founded: 1992
- Ground: Trowbridge Road, Bradford-on-Avon
- Capacity: 1,800 (100 seated)
- Chairman: Steve Rose
- Manager: Chris Carr
- League: Hellenic League Premier Division
- 2025–26: Western League Premier Division, 10th of 18 (transferred)
Home colours	Away colours

Bradford Town Football Club is a football club based in Bradford-on-Avon in Wiltshire, England. They are currently members of the Hellenic League Premier Division and play at Trowbridge Road.

== History ==
The club was established in 1992 by Les and Pat Stevens, and joined the Division Two of the Wiltshire League. They were Division Two champions in 1993–94, earning promotion to Division One, which became the Premier Division in 1998. In 2004–05 Bradford were runners-up in the Premier Division and were promoted to Division One of the Western League. After five consecutive top-five finishes between 2008–09 and 2012–13, the club were Division One champions in 2013–14, earning promotion to the Premier Division. In 2020–21 the club won the Western League's Les Phillips Cup, beating Bridgwater Town 1–0 in the final. At the end of the season they were transferred to the Premier Division of the Hellenic League. In 2022–23 the club finished second-from-bottom of the division and were relegated to Division One of the Western League.

In 2024–25 Bradford finished fourth in Division One, qualifying for the promotion play-offs. After beating Devizes Town on penalties in the semi-finals, they defeated Calne Town 5–0 in the final to earn promotion to the Premier Division.

== Ground ==
The club initially played at the St Laurence School on a roped-off pitch. After moving up to the top division of the Wiltshire League, the club moved to Trowbridge Town's Frome Road ground, where they remained until moving back to Bradford on Avon in 1996 to move into the Bradford on Avon Sports and Social Club. Floodlights were installed during the 2008–09 season and inaugurated by Steve Phillips. A 100-seat stand was erected the following season. The club's record attendance of 621 was set in 2015 for an FA Vase fourth round match against Melksham Town.

== Honours ==
- Western League
  - Division One champions 2012–13
  - Les Phillips Cup winners 2020–21
- Wiltshire League
  - Division Two champions 1993–94

== Records ==
- Best FA Cup performance: Second qualifying round, 2015–16
- Best FA Vase performance: Fifth round, 2014–15, 2017–18, 2019–20
- Record attendance: 621 vs Melksham Town, FA Vase fourth round, 2015
