= Almondsbury F.C. =

Association football club in England

Coordinates: 51°32′56″N 2°34′19″W

Almondsbury
- Full name: Almondsbury Football Club
- Nickname: The Almonds
- Founded: 1969 (as Patchway North End)
- Ground: The Field, Almondsbury
- Chairman: Chris Hancock
- Manager: Ashley Coles
- League: Western League Division One
- 2025–26: Western League Division One, 11th of 20
Home colours	Away colours

Almondsbury Football Club is a football club based in Almondsbury, near Bristol, England. Affiliated to the Gloucestershire County FA, they are currently members of the Western League Division One and play at the Field.

== History ==
The club was established in 1969 as Patchway North End, and were originally based in Patchway, before becoming Patchway Old Boys in 1971. In 1989 they relocated to nearby Almondsbury and were renamed Almondsbury Football Club. They were members of the Bristol & Suburban League until winning the league in 2000–01, earning promotion to the Gloucestershire County League.

In 2003–04 Almondsbury won the Gloucestershire County League title and were promoted to the Division One of the Western League. After partnering with the University of the West of England, the club were renamed Almondsbury UWE in 2009. They finished bottom of Division One in 2016–17, but were not relegated. In the summer of 2017 the club dropped "UWE" from their name. At the end of the 2017–18 season, they were transferred to Division One West of the Hellenic League. The club were transferred back to Division One of the Western League at the end of the following season. They finished bottom of Division One in 2022–23 and were relegated back to the Gloucestershire County League.

The 2024–25 season saw Almondsbury win the Gloucestershire County League in 2024-25, earning promotion to Division One of the Western League.

== Honours ==
- Gloucestershire County League
  - Champions 2003–04, 2024–25
- Bristol Suburban League
  - Premier Division champions 2000–01

== Records ==
- Best FA Cup performance: First qualifying round, 2012–13, 2015–16
- Best FA Vase performance: Second round, 2018–19

== See also ==
- Almondsbury F.C. players
- Almondsbury F.C. managers
