= Shepton Mallet F.C. =

Association football club in England

Coordinates: 51°11′11″N 2°33′34″W

Shepton Mallet A.F.C
- Full name: Shepton Mallet Association Football Club
- Nickname: The Mallet
- Founded: 1986
- Ground: The Playing Fields, Shepton Mallet
- Capacity: 2,500 (120 seated)
- Chairman: Rodney Neale
- Manager: Craig Loxton
- League: Western League Premier Division
- 2025–26: Western League Premier Division, 16th of 18
Home colours	Away colours

Shepton Mallet Association Football Club are a football club based in Shepton Mallet, Somerset, England. They are currently members of Western League Premier Division and play at the Playing Fields.

== History ==
They were established in 1986 after the liquidation of Shepton Mallet Town. The club is affiliated to the Somerset County FA.

The old Shepton Mallet Town had spent 10 years in the Western League, six of which in the Premier Division. When that club went bust, the new Shepton Mallet A.F.C. took the place of the old club's reserves in the Somerset Senior League Division Two, playing at the old club's West Shepton ground. By 1989, they rose to the Premier Division of the County League and played there until winning the title in the 2000–01 season, when they were accepted into the Western League, and are currently members of the Western League Premier Division.

They currently enter both the FA Cup and FA Vase, but do not have a very good record in either competition, In more recent years. The team have found a rise in success in both competitions, most notably the latter—winning six ties in the last eight FA Cup seasons, and ten ties in the last eight years in the Vase.

In the 2014–15 FA Vase Shepton managed to achieve a spot in the Third-round proper for the first time in their history. They went on to lose the tie against Melksham Town 3 - 2 with Melksham following Shepton's steps in the round previous and being knocked out in the Fourth-round proper.

In the 2019-20 Western League Premier season, Shepton were on course to achieve their highest finish in the Western League Premier Division in their history of the competition with 55 points and were challenging for promotion into the Southern League Division One South league under the management of Craig Loxton. The season was postponed and was made null and void due to the ongoing COVID-19 pandemic.

In 2023–24 Western Football League Premier Division, Shepton finished 8th under the new management of Aaron Seviour and Matt Morris.

== Ground ==
Shepton Mallet play their home games at Playing Fields, Old Wells Road, West Shepton, Shepton Mallet, BA4 5XN.

== Honours ==
- Somerset Senior League Premier Division
  - Winners: 2001
- Somerset Senior Cup
  - Winners (1): 1997–98
- Les Phillips Cup
  - Winners (1): 2023/24

== Records ==
- Highest League Position: 6th in Western League Premier Division 2017-18
- FA Cup best performance: Second Qualifying Round, 2022–23
- FA Vase best performance: Third-Round Proper, 2014–15
- Les Phillips Cup: Winners, 2023 - 2024
