= Bitton A.F.C. =

Association football club in England

Coordinates: 51°25′42″N 2°28′18″W

Bitton
- Full name: Bitton Association Football Club
- Nicknames: The Ton, The Boyds, The River Boys
- Founded: 1892
- Ground: Recreation Ground, Bitton
- Capacity: 2,000 (100 seated)
- Chairman: John Langdon
- Manager: Dean Langdon
- League: Western League Division One
- 2025–26: Western League Division One, 6th of 20
Home colours	Away colours

Bitton Association Football Club is a football club based in the South Gloucestershire suburb of Bitton, in England. Affiliated to the Gloucestershire County Football Association, they are currently members of the Western League Division One and play at the Recreation Ground on Bath Road.

== History ==
The club was established in 1892. They were members of the Bristol & Suburban League, before joining the Bristol & District League in the late 1920s. The club were relegated to Division Four in the early 1950s, but a fourth-place finish in 1954–55 saw them promoted to Division Three, and they went on to win Division Three the following season. The club switched to the Bristol Premier Combination in the late 1950s, but returned to the Bristol & District League in 1960. They then joined the Bristol Church of England League, before returning to the Bristol Premier Combination, now renamed the Avon Premier Combination, during the 1970s. Bitton were promoted to the Premier Division in 1990–91, and in 1994–95 they won the Gloucestershire Senior Amateur Cup and were runners-up in the Premier Division, earning promotion to the Gloucestershire County League.

In 1996–97 Bitton were runners-up in the Gloucestershire County League and were promoted to Division One of the Western League. The 2003–04 season saw the club finish second in Division One, resulting in promotion to the Premier Division. They went on to win the league's Les Phillips Cup and the Gloucestershire Challenge Trophy in 2007–08. The club retain the Challenge Trophy as well as winning the Premier Division title the following season; however, they were unable to take promotion to the Southern League as their ground did not meet the requirements. They went on to finish as runners-up in 2010–11 and 2011–12.

The 2019–20 season saw Bitton reach the semi-finals of the FA Vase, eventually losing 1–0 after extra time to Consett. In October 2022 the club withdrew from the Western League, citing travelling costs as the main reason for the decision. However, they rejoined Division One the following season. Although the club went on to finish third in Division One in 2023–24, their resignation the previous season meant they were ineligible for promotion and unable to take part in the play-offs.

== Ground ==
The club has played at the Recreation Ground since their establishment. A seated stand and cover for 150 was installed after joining the Western League, with floodlights erected in 2001. The ground currently has a capacity of 2,000, of which 100 is seated.

== Bitton Ladies ==
Bitton Ladies were established in 2007 and joined the Gloucestershire County Women's League. They won the league title and League Cup in 2012–13, and were promoted to the Eastern Division of the South West Regional Women's League. However, they folded at the end of the following season due to a player shortage. The team was reformed in 2022 and won the Gloucestershire County Women's League at the first attempt, earning promotion back to the South West Regional Women's League, as well as winning the League Cup.

== Honours ==
- Western League
  - Premier Division champions 2008–09
  - Les Phillips Cup winners 2007–08
- Bristol & District League
  - Division Three champions 1955–56
- Gloucestershire Challenge Trophy
  - Winners 2007–08, 2008–09
- Gloucestershire Senior Amateur Cup (South)
  - Winners 1994–95

== Records ==
- Best FA Cup performance: Second qualifying round, 2005–06, 2008–09
- Best FA Vase performance: Semi-finals, 2019–20
- Most goals: A. Cole

== See also ==
- Bitton A.F.C. players
