= Bristol Telephones F.C. =

Association football club in England

Coordinates: 51.4080°N 2.5468°W

Bristol Telephones
- Full name: Bristol Telephones Football Club
- Nickname: The Phones
- Founded: 1948
- Ground: Stockwood Lane, Bristol
- Chairman: Gerald Holmes
- Manager: John Allen
- League: Western League Division One
- 2025–26: Western League Division One, 5th of 20
Home colours	Away colours

Bristol Telephones Football Club is a football club based in Stockwood, Bristol, England. They are currently members of the Western League Division One and play at Stockwood Lane.

== History ==
The club was established in 1948 as Bristol Post Office Telephones and joined the Bristol & Suburban League. After finishing bottom of the Premier Division One in 2006–07, they were relegated to Premier Division Two. However, a third-place finish in Premier Division Two in 2009–10 saw the club promoted back to Premier Division One. They went on to win the league and Alf Bosley Cup the following season, after which they won the Steve Tucker Memorial Trophy by defeating Bristol Premier Combination champions Mendip United.

Bristol Telephones retained the Alf Bosley Cup in 2011–12, and were Premier Division One champions again in 2012–13, earning promotion to the Gloucestershire County League. They won the Gloucestershire County League title in 2016–17, and were promoted to Division One of the Western League.

== Ground ==
The club played at the Bristol Civil Service Club until British Telecom was privatised. After playing temporarily at several other grounds, the social club purchased land on Stockwood Lane to build a new ground in 1984.

== Honours ==
- Gloucestershire County League
  - Champions 2016–17
- Bristol & Suburban League
  - Premier Division champions 2010–11, 2012–13
  - Alf Bosley Cup winners 2010–11, 2011–12
- Gloucestershire Junior Cup
  - Winners 1974–75
- Steve Tucker Memorial Trophy
  - Winners 2010–11
