= Cheddar A.F.C. =

Association football club in England

Coordinates: 51.2717°N 2.7745°W

Cheddar
- Full name: Cheddar Association Football Club
- Nickname: The Cheesemen
- Founded: 1892
- Ground: Bowdens Park, Cheddar
- Chairman: Matt Huxtable
- Manager: Vacant
- League: Somerset County League Premier Division
- 2025–26: Western League Division One, 20th of 20 (relegated)
| Home colours | Away colours |

Cheddar Association Football Club is a football club based in Cheddar, near Wells in Somerset, England. They are currently members of the Somerset County League Premier Division and play at Bowdens Park.

== History ==
The club was established in 1892. They later joined the Cheddar Valley League, and were champions in 1910–11. The club later transferred to the Weston-super-Mare and District Football League, and won the Somerset Junior Cup in 1931–32. After World War II they rejoined the Cheddar Valley League. The club later moved up to the Somerset County League in 1961, finishing bottom of Division One in 1961–62 and 1962–63.

In 1988–89 Cheddar won the Somerset County League's Division Two and Three Cup. In 1989–90 they finished third in Division Two, earning promotion to Division One. However, they were relegated back to Division Two after three seasons. Another third-place finish in 1997–98 saw the club promoted to Division One again, and in 1999–2000 they won the Premier Division/Division One Cup. In 2003–04 the club were Division One champions, earning promotion to the Premier Division.

Cheddar were Somerset County League Premier Division runners-up in 2011–12 and were promoted to Division One of the Western League. The club finished bottom of Division One in 2025–26 and were relegated back to the Premier Division of the Somerset County League.

== Honours ==
- Somerset County League
  - Division One champions 2003–04
  - Premier/Division One Cup winners 1999–2000
  - Division Two/Three Cup winners 1988–89
- Cheddar Valley League
  - Champions 1910–11
- Cheddar Valley Knockout Cup
  - Winners 1911–12
- Cheddar Valley Charity Cup
  - Winners 1947–48, 1949–50
- Somerset Junior Cup
  - Winners 1931–32

== Records ==
- Best FA Cup performance: Preliminary round, 2018–19
- Best FA Vase performance: Second round, 2018–19, 2020–21
