= Wellington A.F.C. =

Association football club in England

Coordinates: 50°58′42″N 3°13′52″W

Wellington
- Full name: Wellington Association Football Club
- Nickname: The Tangerines
- Founded: 1896
- Ground: The Playing Field, Wellington
- Capacity: 1,500 (200 seated)
- Chairman: Mike Hall
- Manager: Richard Cherry
- League: Western League Premier Division
- 2025–26: Western League Premier Division, 15th of 18
Home colours

Wellington Association Football Club are a football club based in Wellington, Somerset, England. They are currently members of the Western League Premier Division and play at the Playing Field.

== History ==
Founded in 1896, they have played at Wellington Playing Fields in North Street since 1954. The club is affiliated to the Somerset County FA.

Wellington joined the Western League in 1978, and have remained in Division One of that league ever since, except for a three-season spell in the Premier Division from 1981 to 1984. They escaped Division One again in 2008 after winning the title and gaining promotion to the Premier.

The club entered the FA Cup for four seasons in the early 1980s, twice winning a preliminary round tie, but never progressing past the first qualifying round. Their best FA Vase run dates to 1990–91, when they reached the third round (last 64).

Although officially named simply Wellington A.F.C., the county in which they play is often appended to their name to differentiate them from Wellington F.C. based in Herefordshire. They are also sometimes erroneously listed as Wellington Town.

In September 2010 the club launched a ladies team called Wellington Town Ladies who currently play in the Somerset County Women's League Division 1.

In April 2017, Wellington won the Western League Division 1 title, securing promotion to the Premier Division for the 2017–18 season.

== Ground ==
Wellington play their home games at The Playing Field, North Street, Wellington, TA21 8NE.

== Honours ==
- Western Football League Division One
  - Champions 2007–08, 2016–17
  - Runners-up 1980–81
- Western Football League Combination Challenge cup:
  - Winners (2): 1995–96, 1998–99

== Records ==
- FA Cup
  - First Qualifying Round 1981–82, 1984–85
- FA Vase
  - Fourth Round 2021/22
