= Buckland Athletic F.C. =

Association football club in England

Coordinates: 50°30′48″N 3°35′45″W

Buckland Athletic
- Full name: Buckland Athletic Football Club
- Nickname: The Bucks
- Founded: 1977
- Ground: Homers Heath, Newton Abbot
- Chairman: Nigel Holmes and John Piller
- Manager: Matt Cusack
- League: Western League Premier Division
- 2025–26: Western League Premier Division, 7th of 18
- Website: bucklandathletic.co.uk
Home colours	Away colours

Buckland Athletic Football Club is a football club based in Newton Abbot, Devon, England. They are currently members of the Western League Premier Division and play at Homers Heath.

== History ==
The club was established in 1977 as a youth team and joined the Torbay Pioneer League. After winning the Devon Youth Cup, the club entered senior football, joining Division Three of the Devon & Exeter League in 1987. They won the division at the first attempt, and were promoted to Division Two. They were promoted again the following season, moving up to Division One.

A fourth-place finish in Division One in 1992–93 saw Buckland promoted to the Premier Division. They went on to win the Premier Division title and Football Express Cup in 1994–95, and the East Devon Senior Cup the following season. The club won the Premier Division Cup in 1997–98, and after retaining it the following season, they were Premier Division champions again in 1999–2000.

After winning their second Premier Division title, Buckland moved up to the Devon County League, and were runners-up in their first season. In 2007 the league merged with the South Western League to form the South West Peninsula League, with Buckland placed in the Premier Division. They were Premier Division champions in 2009–10 and retained the title the following season. After finishing as Premier Division runners-up in 2011–12, the club were promoted to the Premier Division of the Western League. In 2014–15 they were Western League runners-up. They finished fifth in the Premier Division in 2024–25, qualifying for the promotion play-offs, in which they lost 3–1 to Clevedon Town in the semi-finals.

== Ground ==
The club initially played at Sandringham Park, before moving to Decoy during the 1990–91 season. Within two years they moved to Homers Lane. In 2005 the club relocated to their current Homers Heath ground on Kingkerswell Road. The ground was officially opened on 13 July by Steve Perryman prior to a friendly match against Plymouth Argyle.

== Management staff ==
Position	Staff
Head Coach	(England) Matt Cusack
Assistant Manager	(Wales) Dan Harrison
Assistant Manager	(Republic of Ireland) Shane Reavey
Goalkeeping Coach	(Wales) Nicky Church
Physio	(England) Paige Burrows

== Honours ==
- South West Peninsula League
  - Premier Division champions 2009–10, 2010–11
  - Throgmorton Cup winners 2009–10
  - Charity Bowl winners 2009–10, 2010–11
- Devon and Exeter League
  - Premier Division champions 1994–95, 1999–2000
  - Division Three champions 1987–88
  - Premier Cup winners 1997–98, 1998–99
- Devon St Lukes Bowl
  - Winners 2010–11, 2011–12
- East Devon Senior Cup
  - Winners 1995–96
- Football Express Cup
  - Winners 1994–95

== Records ==
- Best FA Cup performance: Second qualifying round, 2012–13
- Best FA Vase performance: Quarter-finals, 2016–17

== See also ==
- Buckland Athletic F.C. players
- Buckland Athletic F.C. managers
