= Calne Town F.C. =

Association football club in England

Coordinates: 51.4461°N 2.0113°W

Calne Town
- Full name: Calne Town Football Club
- Nickname: The Lilywhites
- Founded: 1886
- Ground: Bremhill View, Calne
- Capacity: 2,500 (78 seated)
- Manager: Vacant
- League: Western League Division One
- 2025–26: Western League Division One, 14th of 20
Home colours	Away colours

Calne Town Football Club is a football club based in Calne, Wiltshire, England. They are currently members of the Western League Division One and play at Bremhill View.

== History ==
The club was established in 1886, and in 1894 they were founder members of the Wiltshire League. They finished bottom of the table in 1901–02 and 1902–03, and when the league gained a second division in 1903, the club were excluded from Division One. However, they were Division Two champions in 1906–07, earning promotion to Division One. Despite finishing bottom of Division One for the next two seasons, the club avoided relegation to Division Two. They left the league in 1912, but went on to win the Wiltshire Senior Cup in the 1912–13 season, beating Trowbridge in the final. The club returned to the Wiltshire League in 1919, and after merging with Harris Football Club in 1920, they became Calne & Harris United.

After World War II Calne did not rejoin the Wiltshire League for the 1945–46 season, but returned the following year. They finished bottom of the league again in 1961–62 and after being renamed Calne Town in 1963, they finished last every season from 1963–64 until 1966–67. When the Wiltshire League merged with the Wiltshire Combination to form the Wiltshire County League in 1976, Calne were placed in Division One. The club won the Wiltshire Senior Cup again in 1984–85, beating Swindon Supermarine in the final.

In 1985–86 Calne finished third in Division One, and were accepted into Division One of the Western League. They were Division One runners-up in 1992–93, earning promotion to the Premier Division. The club remained in the Premier Division until the end of the 1998–99 season, when they finished bottom of the table and were relegated back to Division One. The club were Division One runners-up in 2004–05 and were promoted back to the Premier Division. Although they won the Wiltshire Senior Cup again in 2009–10, the club also finishing bottom of the Premier Division and were relegated back to Division One.

Calne won the Wiltshire Senior Cup for a fourth time in 2011–12, beating Bemerton Heath Harlequins in the final. In 2021 the club were promoted to the Premier Division of the Hellenic League based on their results in the abandoned 2019–20 and 2020–21 seasons. However, they finished second-from-bottom of the Premier Division in 2021–22 and were relegated to the Hellenic League's Division One. At the end of the 2023–24 season the club were transferred to Division One of the Western League.

== Ground ==
The club originally played at the Recreation Ground in the centre of Calne. They relocated to their Bremhill View ground in the early 1960s.

== Honours ==
- Wiltshire League
  - Division Two champions 1906–07
- Wiltshire Senior Cup
  - Winners 1912–13, 1984–85, 2008–09, 2011–12

== Records ==
- Best FA Cup performance: Third qualifying round, 1959–60, 1997–98
- Best FA Vase performance: Third round, 2006–07
- Record attendance: 1,100 vs Swindon Town, friendly
- Most appearances: Gary Swallow, 259
- Most goals: Robbie Lardner

== See also ==
- Calne Town F.C. players
