= Odd Down A.F.C. =

Association football club in England

Coordinates: 51°21′08″N 2°22′54″W

Odd Down
- Full name: Odd Down Football Club
- Nickname: The Down
- Founded: 1901
- Ground: Lew Hill Memorial Ground, Odd Down, Bath
- Capacity: 1,000 (160 seated)
- Manager: Tom Smith
- League: Western League Division One
- 2025–26: Western League Division One, 12th of 20
| Home colours | Away colours |

Odd Down Football Club is a football club based in the Odd Down area of Bath, England. They are currently members of the Western League Division One and play at the Lew Hill Memorial Ground. The club is affiliated to the Somerset County FA.

== History ==
As far as can be traced the club was founded in 1901 by Fred Weaver and brothers Walt and Stan Noad. Odd Down, then a self-contained village on the outskirts of Bath in Somerset, played in the Bath and District Football League. In 1920 Odd Down won the Bath City Knockout Cup, but in all its playing years the club has had little success in winning cups. Odd Down FC spent their formative years on pitches at Stirtingale Farm and at the Quarr Ground, before moving to Combe Hay Lane in the 1930s. The club was finally able to purchase the ground in 1952 and it was renamed in memory of long-serving former President Lew Hill.

During the 1920s the club played in the Wiltshire Football League, but prior to World War II had graduated to playing in the Somerset Senior League. Re-grouping after the war, Odd Down started off again in the Somerset Senior League and in the 1946–47 season finished as runners-up to Somerton. They also won the Mid-Somerset Football League that season, a league formed to make up for the shortage of Somerset Senior League fixtures at that time.

Following a bad report into the facilities at Odd Down the club were expelled from the Somerset Senior League, whereupon an application to join the Wiltshire Football League was accepted. A few years later the Wiltshire League voiced disapproval of Somerset-based teams competing in their league and Odd Down found themselves re-admitted to the Somerset Senior League.

From 1967 to 1972 the club formed a steering committee which worked hard to provide a social club, eventually opening one on 5 April 1972. The hard work paid off as Odd Down gained admittance to the Western Football League for the start of the 1977–78 season. However, it was to be season 1991–92 before the club won its first major honour, lifting the Somerset Senior Cup, and further success was to come the following season as the club won promotion to the Western League Premier Division, finishing as the 1992–93 Division One Champions.

In their centenary year of 2001 Odd Down reached the final of the Somerset Premier Cup for the first time, losing 1–0 to Southern League side Clevedon Town. The feat was repeated in 2004, this time going down 5–0 to Yeovil Town at the club's Huish Park home.

They remained in the Premier Division until relegation to Division One in 2008, but were promoted back to the Premier Division in 2010, where they remain to this day.

The Odd Down AFC Development Team, achieved a remarkable treble during the 2024–25 season. Under the leadership of manager Prince Sharka and assistant Ollie Millet, the team secured victories in the Morland Cup, Tony Baxter Shield, and Somerset Intermediate Cup. Notably, they triumphed over AFC Nailsea with a 4–1 win in the Somerset Intermediate Cup final on 16 May 2025. The Team also finished runners up in the league losing out to a points deduction.

== Ground ==
Odd Down play their home games at Lew Hill Memorial Ground, Combe Hay Lane, Odd Down, Bath, Somerset, BA2 8AP.

== Honours ==
- Western Football League Premier Division
  - Champions: 2015–16
- Western Football League Division One
  - Champions: 1992–93
  - Runners-up: 2009–10
- Somerset Premier Cup
  - Runners-up: 2000–01, 2004–05
- Somerset FA Senior Cup
  - Winners: 1991–92
- Somerset Senior League Division Two
  - Winners (reserves): 1993–94, 2002–03
- Tony Baxter shield
- Winners (Development): 2024-2025
- Somerset Intermediate County Cup
- Winners (Development): 2024-2025
- Morland Cup
- Winners (Development): 2024-2025

== Records ==
- FA Cup best performance: second qualifying round – 1992–93
- FA Vase best performance: fourth round – 1981–82
