= Longwell Green Sports F.C. =

Association football club in England

Coordinates: 51°26′17″N 2°29′27″W

Longwell Green Sports
- Full name: Longwell Green Sports Football Club
- Nickname: The Green
- Founded: 1966
- Ground: Longwell Green Community Stadium, Longwell Green
- Capacity: 1,000
- Chairman: John Gibbs
- Manager: Chris Alway
- League: Western League Division One
- 2025–26: Western League Division One, 8th of 20
Home colours	Away colours

Longwell Green Sports Football Club is a football club based in the South Gloucestershire suburb of Longwell Green, in England. Affiliated to the Gloucestershire County FA, they are currently members of the Western League Division One and play at the Longwell Green Community Stadium.

== History ==
The club was established in 1966 by staff of Longwell Green Coachworks following England's World Cup win. They became members of the Bristol & District League and reached Division One by the 1980s. After finishing third in Division One in 1990–91, the club were promoted to the Senior Division. They went on to win the Senior Division the following season and subsequently moved up to Division One of the Avon Premier Combination.

Longwell Green's first season in Division One of the Avon Premier Combination saw them finish as runners-up, earning promotion to the Premier Division; in 1994 the league became the Bristol Premier Combination. The club were Premier Division runners-up in 2003–04 and were promoted to the Gloucestershire County League. They finished second in the league in their first season, only missing out on winning the title on goal difference. However, the club were promoted again, this time to Division One of the Western League.

In 2008–09 Longwell Green were Western League Division One runners-up, earning promotion to the Premier Division. They finished second-from-bottom of the Premier Division in 2017–18 and were relegated back to Division One.

== Ground ==
The club have played at the Longwell Green Community Stadium since their establishment, with the pitch first marked out in 1966 on what was then open farmland.

== Honours ==
- Bristol & District League
  - Senior Division champions 1991–92

== Records ==
- Best FA Cup performance: First qualifying round, 2014–15
- Best FA Vase performance: Second round, 2009–10, 2012–13, 2023–24
- Record attendance: 500 vs Mangotsfield United, 2005

== See also ==
- Longwell Green Sports F.C. players
