= Warminster Town F.C. =

Association football club in England

Coordinates: 51°12′04″N 2°11′02″W

Warminster Town
- Full name: Warminster Town Football Club
- Nicknames: The Red & Blacks
- Founded: 1878
- Ground: Weymouth Street, Warminster
- Chairman: James Stone
- Manager: Aaron Seviour & Matty Morris
- League: Division One Jewson Western League
- 2025–26: 20th
Home colours

Warminster Town Football Club are a football club based in Warminster, Wiltshire, England. They are currently members of the Western League Division One and play at Weymouth Street, Warminster BA12 9NS

== History ==
Though records indicate Warminster Town F.C. being founded in 1878, it was not firmly established until 1885. They played in the Wiltshire County League until the 1929–30 season, after which they successfully applied to join the Western League. Following the end of the Second World War they reverted to the Wiltshire County League. It was not until the 1983–84 season that they again competed in the Western League until relegation back to the Wiltshire County League at the end of the 2005–06 season. The club then successfully applied to join the Wessex League for the 2008–07 season before rejoining the Western League for the 2012–13 season.

The club had originally played at Holly Lodge on Boreham Road, but subsequently moved to their current ground on Weymouth Street. In 1994 the ground underwent significant redevelopment.

== Ground ==
Warminster Town play their home games at Weymouth Street, Warminster.

== Club records ==
- Best FA Cup performance: 2nd qualifying round replay, 1963–64
- Best FA Vase performance: 4th round, 2019–20

== Honours ==
Wiltshire County FA Senior Cup

- Winners (4) 1900–01, 1902–03, 1910–11, 2025-26
  - Runners up (5) 1909–10, 1926–27, 1932–33, 1953–54, 2008–09
- Alliance Shield Winners 2019
