= Cadbury Heath F.C. =

Association football club in England

Coordinates: 51°27′4″N 2°28′52″W

Cadbury Heath
- Full name: Cadbury Heath Football Club
- Nicknames: The Heathens, The Heath
- Founded: 1894
- Ground: Springfield, Cadbury Heath
- Chairman: Shaun Honour
- Manager: Nick Wilson
- League: Western League Division One
- 2025–26: Western League Division One, 13th of 20
Home colours	Away colours

Cadbury Heath Football Club is a football club based in Cadbury Heath, South Gloucestershire, England. Affiliated to the Gloucestershire County FA, they are currently members of the Western League Division One and play at Springfield.

== History ==
The club was established in 1894 under the name Cadbury Heath Adult School. They won the Gloucestershire FA Junior Cup in 1949–50. After winning Division One of the Bristol & District League in 1960–61, the club were promoted to Division Two of the Bristol Premier Combination. They were Division Two champions the following seasons, earning promotion to Division One.

Cadbury Heath became founder members of the Gloucestershire County League in 1968. The club won the league in 1970–71 and went on to win the title in each of the next three seasons. They also won the Gloucestershire FA Amateur Cup in 1972–73 and 1973–74. After finishing as runners-up in the league and retaining the Amateur Cup in 1974–75, they transferred to the Midland Combination. However, they finished bottom of the Combination in 1976–77 and dropped back into the Avon Premier Combination.

In 1980 Cadbury Heath rejoined the Gloucestershire County League. After finishing in the bottom half of the table every season during the 1980s, the club were league runners-up in 1990–91 and again the following season. They went on to win the league in 1993–94. The club were runners-up again in 1995–96 and then won back-to-back league titles in 1997–98 and 1998–99. After finishing as runners-up in 1999–2000, they were promoted to Division One of the Western League. In 2011–12 the club were Division One champions, earning promotion to the Premier Division. The 2016–17 season saw the club win the Gloucestershire FA Challenge Trophy, beating Fairford Town 4–2 on penalties after a 2–2 draw.

In 2022–23 Cadbury Heath finished second-from-bottom of the Premier Division, resulting in relegation to Division One.

== Ground ==
The club initially played at Mill Lane, with the nearby social club used as changing rooms. After World War II they moved to Coronation Park, before relocating to Springfield in the 1960s, with the land initially rented from local farmer and club president Jim Warner. A new stand was built when the club joined the Midland Combination in 1975. Floodlights were installed during the 2008–09 season.

== Honours ==
- Western League
  - Division One champions 2011–12
- Gloucestershire County League
  - Champions 1970–71, 1971–72, 1972–73, 1973–74, 1993–94, 1997–98, 1998–99
- Bristol Premier Combination
  - Division Two champions 1961–62
- Bristol & District League
  - Division One champions 1960–61
- Gloucestershire FA Challenge Trophy
  - Winners 2016–17
- Gloucestershire FA Amateur Cup
  - Winners 1972–73, 1973–74, 1974–75
- Gloucestershire FA Junior Cup
  - Winners 1949–50

== Records ==
- Best FA Cup performance: Third qualifying round, 2016–17
- Best FA Vase performance: Quarter-finals, 1975–76
- Most goals: Matt Huxley, 296

== See also ==
- Cadbury Heath F.C. players
