= 2019–20 FA Vase =

2019–20 Buildbase FA Vase
Football Association Vase

Tournament details
- Country: England; Wales

Final positions
- Champions: Hebburn Town (1st title)
- Runners-up: Consett

Tournament statistics
- Top goal scorer: Jack Crago (10 goals)

The 2019–20 Buildbase FA Vase was the 46th season of the FA Vase, an annual football competition for teams competing below Step 4 of the English National League System. The competition consisted of two qualifying rounds, six proper rounds, semi-finals (played over two legs), and the final played at Wembley Stadium. All first-leg ties until the semi-finals went to with extra time if level after 90 minutes; first-leg ties could also be resolved with penalties if both teams agreed and notified the referee at least 45 minutes before kick-off, per rule 11a of the Rules of the Challenge Vase.

The competition was paused at the semi-final stage due to the COVID-19 pandemic in the United Kingdom. The competition resumed in September 2020, but following new restrictions on gatherings in England the final was further postponed eventually being played on 3 May 2021.

== Calendar ==
The calendar for the 2019–20 Buildbase FA Vase, as announced by The Football Association.

Round	Main Date	Number of Fixtures	Clubs Remaining	New Entries This Round	Losing Club	Winning Club
First round qualifying	31 August 2019	268	667 → 399	536	£175	£550
Second round qualifying	14 September 2019	169	399 → 230	70	£250	£725
First round proper	12 October 2019	102	230 → 128	35	£275	£825
Second round proper	2 November 2019	64	128 → 64	26	£300	£900
Third round proper	30 November 2019	32	64 → 32	0	£375	£1,125
Fourth round proper	11 January 2020	16	32 → 16	0	£625	£1,875
Fifth round proper	8 February 2020	8	16 → 8	0	£750	£2,250
Quarter-finals	29 February 2020	4	8 → 4	0	£1,375	£4,125
Semi-finals	5 September 2020	2	4 → 2	0	£1,750	£5,500
Final	TBD	1	2 → 1	0	£20,000	£30,000

== First round qualifying ==
Tie	Home team (tier)	Score	Away team (tier)	Att.
Friday 30 August 2019
68	GNP Sports (10)	3–2	Littleton (10)	80
71	St. Martins (10)	0–3	Shifnal Town (10)	58
100	Aylestone Park (10)	0–3	Loughborough University (9)	118
113	Walsham-le-Willows (9)	2–1	Lakenheath (10)	95
118	Park View (10)	A–A	West Essex (9)	70
Match abandoned in the 87th minute tied 1-1, due to a West Essex injury.
122	Clapton (9)	1–6	Catholic United (11)	48
140	Hackney Wick (10)	6–3	May & Baker (10)	50
172	Ascot United (9)	3–3	Fleet Town (9)	174
174	Shrivenham (9)	3–2	Milton United (10)	55
180	New College Swindon (10)	0–7	Royal Wootton Bassett Town (9)	70
184	Binfield (9)	1–0 (a.e.t.)	Virginia Water (9)	129
229	Fareham Town (9)	2–0	Whitchurch United (10)	130
232	Hamble Club (9)	4–0	Totton & Eling (10)	105
Saturday 31 August 2019
1	Whitley Bay (9)	1–2	Barnoldswick Town (9)	308
2	Birtley Town (10)	2–5	Jarrow (10)	107
3	Harrogate Railway Athletic (10)	0–4	West Allotment Celtic (10)	71
4	Willington (10)	0–2	Albion Sports (9)	82
5	Garstang (10)	1–2	Sunderland West End (10)	123
6	Northallerton Town (9)	7–0	Stokesley SC (11)	128
7	Shildon (9)	3–0	Tow Law Town (10)	188
8	Chester-le-Street Town (10)	1–2	Garforth Town (9)	105
9	Knaresborough Town (9)	2–1	Washington (10)	109
10	Whitehaven (11)	0–9	Billingham Synthonia (10)	55
11	Billingham Town (9)	2–1	Heaton Stannington (10)	161
12	Penrith (9)	0–1	Guisborough Town (9)	135
13	Stockton Town (9)	4–0	Ashington (9)	405
14	Thackley (9)	3–2	Carlisle City (10)	83
15	Crook Town (10)	2–1	Brandon United (10)	137
17	Nelson (10)	1–3 (a.e.t.)	Seaham Red Star (9)	55
18	AFC Blackpool (10)	2–1	Redcar Athletic (10)	125
19	Padiham (9)	5–0	Bedlington Terriers (10)	120
20	Longridge Town (9)	5–2	Newcastle University (10)	169
21	Newton Aycliffe (9)	2–1	Silsden (9)	120
22	Easington Colliery (10)	4–1	Holker Old Boys (10)	75
23	Eccleshill United (9)	0–4	Thornaby (9)	69
24	Yorkshire Amateur (9)	1–0	Alnwick Town (11)	62
25	Esh Winning (10)	3–2	Campion (10)	66
26	Ryhope Colliery Welfare (9)	2–0	North Shields (9)	86
27	Prestwich Heys (10)	1–0	1874 Northwich (9)	207
28	Swallownest (10)	0–2	Vauxhall Motors (10)	75
30	Retford United (11)	3–2	Daisy Hill (10)	84
31	Skelmersdale United (9)	5–2	New Mills (10)	89
33	Ashton Athletic (9)	3–2	AFC Darwen (10)	29
34	Bacup Borough (10)	1–2	Grimsby Borough (9)	46
36	Cammell Laird 1907 (10)	2–3	Charnock Richard (9)	103
37	Parkgate (10)	2–3	Chadderton (10)	85
38	Retford (10)	1–3	Barton Town (9)	103
39	Wythenshawe Town (10)	5–2	Goole (9)	174
40	Nostell Miners Welfare (10)	4–1	AFC Liverpool (10)	72
41	Staveley Miners Welfare (9)	2–5	Cheadle Town (10)	124
43	Harworth Colliery (11)	1–3	Stockport Town (10)	68
44	Cheadle Heath Nomads (10)	5–3	Ashton Town (10)	44
45	Maine Road (10)	5–2	Maltby Main (9)	49
47	Brigg Town (10)	3–0	Armthorpe Welfare (10)	118
48	Pilkington (10)	3–2 (a.e.t.)	Atherton Laburnum Rovers (10)	111
49	Rylands (9)	6–0	Athersley Recreation (9)	97
50	Liversedge (9)	2–1 (a.e.t.)	Hallam (10)	96
51	West Didsbury & Chorlton (10)	W.O.	Egerton (11)	NA
West Didsbury & Chorlton awarded a walkover due to Egerton failing ground grading requirements.
52	Avro (9)	0–2	Selby Town (10)	65
53	Abbey Hulton United (10)	3–2	Tipton Town (11)	54
54	Boldmere St. Michaels (9)	3–2	Stourport Swifts (9)	81
55	Heather St John's (9)	3–0	Hereford Pegasus (10)	49
56	Bromyard Town (11)	0–4	Uttoxeter Town (10)	32
57	Stafford Town (10)	1–3	Tividale (9)	78
58	Leicester Road (10)	3–1	Dudley Sports (10)	43
59	Racing Club Warwick (9)	4–0	AFC Bridgnorth (10)	115
60	FC Oswestry Town (10)	6–0	Bustleholme (11)	85
61	Highgate United (9)	11–1	Ellistown (11)	82
62	Bewdley Town (10)	1–2	Alsager Town (10)	70
64	Heath Hayes (10)	1–2 (a.e.t.)	Ashby Ivanhoe (10)	54
65	Eccleshall (10)	2–3 (a.e.t.)	Hanley Town (9)	109
67	Bolehall Swifts (11)	0–5	Coventry Copsewood (10)	43
69	Nuneaton Griff (10)	5–3 (a.e.t.)	Wellington Amateurs (11)	40
70	Stapenhill (10)	0–2	Dudley Town (10)	71
72	Wolverhampton Casuals (10)	2–1	Bilston Town (10)	71
73	Haughmond (9)	3–1	Stone Old Alleynians (10)	51
74	Gresley (9)	1–0	Winsford United (9)	134
75	Lichfield City (10)	5–2	Romulus (9)	58
76	Sandbach United (10)	13–0	Wem Town (10)	85
77	Studley (10)	3–2	Brocton (10)	79
78	Wellington (10)	0–5	Worcester City (9)	117
79	Wolverhampton Sporting (10)	3–0	Cradley Town (10)	35
80	Hinckley (10)	2–1	Ellesmere Rangers (10)	121
81	Coton Green (11)	0–3	Shawbury United (10)	50
82	Wednesfield (10)	0–2	Droitwich Spa (11)	54
83	Coventry Sphinx (9)	2–1	AFC Wulfrunians (9)	76
84	County Hall (11)	1–3	Newark Flowserve (9)	57
85	Radford (10)	1–3	Cottesmore Amateurs (11)	56
86	Holbeach United (9)	3–2	Lincoln Moorlands Railway (11)	106
87	Bourne Town (10)	4–2	Sleaford Town (9)	74
88	Kirby Muxloe (10)	3–2 (a.e.t.)	Oakham United (11)	47
89	FC Bolsover (10)	W.O.	Long Eaton United (9)	NA
Long Eaton United awarded a walkover due to FC Bolsover withdrawing from the East Midlands Counties League.
90	Harrowby United (10)	3–1	Belper United (10)	58
91	Shirebrook Town (10)	3–2 (a.e.t.)	Arnold Town (11)	91
92	Quorn (9)	6–1	Boston Town (9)	93
93	Horncastle Town (11)	0–2	Sherwood Colliery (10)	280
94	Dunkirk (10)	1–0	Oadby Town (9)	22
95	AFC Mansfield (9)	1–0	Graham Street Prims (10)	65
96	Melton Town (10)	2–4 (a.e.t.)	Gedling Miners Welfare (10)	104
97	Barrow Town (10)	5–3	Friar Lane & Epworth (11)	71
98	Pinxton (11)	2–3	Birstall United (10)	70
99	Hucknall Town (10)	4–3 (a.e.t.)	Holbrook Sports (11)	113
101	Holwell Sports (10)	1–2	Heanor Town (10)	94
102	South Normanton Athletic (9)	7–0	Ollerton Town (10)	52
103	GNG FC (11)	0–9	Clifton All Whites (10)	38
105	Kimberley Miners Welfare (10)	2–1	Clipstone (10)	46
106	Borrowash Victoria (10)	1–2	West Bridgford (10)	40
108	Newmarket Town (9)	2–1	Gorleston (9)	91
109	Norwich CBS (10)	1–2	March Town United (10)	
111	Framlingham Town (10)	1–1 (2–4 p)	Great Yarmouth Town (10)	85
112	Fakenham Town (10)	0–4	Norwich United (9)	67
114	Mildenhall Town (9)	2–0	Swaffham Town (9)	165
115	Debenham LC (10)	2–0	Wisbech St. Mary (10)	44
116	Diss Town (10)	1–3	Huntingdon Town (10)	121
117	Ely City (9)	4–6 (a.e.t.)	Peterborough Northern Star (9)	83
119	Wodson Park (10)	2–1	Sawbridgworth Town (9)	18
120	Holland (10)	0–2	Baldock Town (9)	80
121	FC Broxbourne Borough (10)	3–0	Barkingside (10)	35
123	New Salamis (10)	4–0	Codicote (11)	35
124	Hadleigh United (9)	6–2	Stotfold (10)	79
125	Hoddesdon Town (9)	1–2	Stanway Rovers (9)	67
126	Long Melford (9)	1–0	Little Oakley (10)	51
127	Cockfosters (9)	1–2 (a.e.t.)	Coggeshall United (10)	62
128	Woodford Town (9)	1–2	St. Margaretsbury (9)	46
129	Ilford (9)	1–2	Enfield (9)	50
130	Takeley (9)	6–1	Burnham Ramblers (10)	40
131	Halstead Town (10)	1–3	Haverhill Borough (10)	140
132	FC Clacton (9)	3–0	Southend Manor (9)	88
134	Wivenhoe Town (10)	5–1	Clapton Community (11)	133
136	Colney Heath (9)	4–0	London Lions (10)	73
137	Lopes Tavares (10)	2–0	Harwich & Parkeston (10)	8
138	London Colney (9)	3–1	Brimsdown (10)	35
139	Sporting Bengal United (9)	0–1	Wormley Rovers (10)	38
141	Potton United (9)	0–6	Frenford (10)	87
142	Hashtag United (9)	2–0	Leyton Athletic (10)	154
143	Ipswich Wanderers (10)	0–3	Enfield Borough (10)	73
144	Crawley Green (9)	4–2	Ampthill Town (10)	68
145	Risborough Rangers (10)	6–0	Easington Sports (9)	111
146	Holmer Green (9)	0–1	Raunds Town (10)	41
149	Wellingborough Town (9)	4–1	Wellingborough Whitworth (10)	98
150	Bedford (10)	2–0	Burton Park Wanderers (10)	35

Tie	Home team (tier)	Score	Away team (tier)	Att.
151	Burnham (9)	2–4	Harborough Town (9)	87
152	Eynesbury Rovers (9)	2–0	Harpenden Town (9)	92
153	Winslow United (10)	7–1	Rushden & Higham United (10)	82
154	Chinnor (10)	W.O.	Broadfields United (9)	NA
Broadfields United awarded a walkover due to Chinnor withdrawing from the Hellenic Football League.
155	Rugby Borough (11)	2–1	British Airways (10)	46
156	Leighton Town (9)	3–0	Bugbrooke St. Michaels (10)	144
157	Leverstock Green (9)	1–1	Aylesbury Vale Dynamos (9)	67
158	Lutterworth Town (9)	7–1	Pitshanger Dynamo (11)	61
160	Ardley United (9)	1–3	Northampton ON Chenecks (9)	38
162	Flackwell Heath (9)	3–1	Arlesey Town (9)	64
163	AFC Hayes (10)	3–1	Dunstable Town (9)	42
164	Hanworth Villa (9)	5–1	Marston Shelton Rovers (11)	34
165	St. Panteleimon (10)	3–4	Long Buckby (10)	58
166	Bedfont & Feltham (10)	5–0	Lutterworth Athletic (10)	58
167	Rothwell Corinthians (9)	2–0	Desborough Town (9)	83
168	Hillingdon (11)	5–1	Rayners Lane (10)	100
169	NW London (11)	0–2	Harefield United (9)	25
170	Hillingdon Borough (10)	3–2	Kensington & Ealing Borough (10)	50
171	Amersham Town (10)	2–1	Thame Rangers (10)	35
173	Tytherington Rocks (10)	0–2	Newent Town (10)	60
175	Cove (10)	0–1	Fleet Spurs (10)	38
176	Fairford Town (9)	5–1	Abingdon Town (10)	43
177	Frimley Green (9)	3–1	Lydney Town (9)	57
178	Thornbury Town (10)	6–2	Cheltenham Saracens (10)	100
179	Shortwood United (10)	5–0	Tuffley Rovers (9)	75
181	Clanfield (10)	7–3	Sandhurst Town (10)	38
183	Abingdon United (10)	1–0	Eversley & California (10)	41
185	Malmesbury Victoria (10)	3–0	Woodley United (10)	30
186	Banstead Athletic (9)	2–2	Greenwich Borough (9)	23
187	Little Common (9)	1–2	K Sports (9)	38
188	Egham Town (9)	3–2	FC Elmstead (10)	41
189	Wick (10)	0–4 (a.e.t.)	Colliers Wood United (9)	48
190	Lydd Town (10)	5–5	Raynes Park Vale (9)	39
191	Kent Football United (10)	0–1 (a.e.t.)	Snodland Town (10)	47
192	Saltdean United (9)	0–2	Lordswood (9)	46
194	Epsom & Ewell (10)	1–4	Kennington (10)	70
195	Molesey (9)	4–3 (a.e.t.)	Greenways (10)	43
197	AFC Varndeanians (10)	2–2 (2–4 p)	Loxwood (9)	36
198	Farnham Town (10)	2–1	Langney Wanderers (9)	63
199	Sporting Club Thamesmead (10)	3–2	Sutton Athletic (10)	52
201	Southwick (10)	1–2	Billingshurst (10)	34
202	Erith & Belvedere (9)	3–0	Fire United (10)	58
203	Rochester United (10)	0–3	Mile Oak (10)	50
204	Ash United (10)	1–2	Badshot Lea (9)	86
205	Shoreham (10)	0–3	Crowborough Athletic (9)	50
206	Holmesdale (10)	2–1	Sheerwater (9)	67
207	Crawley Down Gatwick (9)	5–4 (a.e.t.)	East Preston (9)	58
208	CB Hounslow United (9)	2–3	Beckenham Town (9)	27
210	Bridon Ropes (10)	2–2 (4–3 p)	Pagham (9)	40
212	Godalming Town (10)	2–1	Hailsham Town (10)	53
213	Storrington (10)	0–6	Knaphill (9)	62
214	Sheppey United (9)	2–0	AFC Croydon Athletic (9)	147
215	Seaford Town (10)	2–1	Eastbourne United (9)	67
216	Forest Hill Park (10)	1–2 (a.e.t.)	Westside (10)	24
217	Lingfield (9)	1–2	Horley Town (9)	61
218	Guildford City (9)	0–3	Glebe (9)	82
219	Peacehaven & Telscombe (9)	2–2	Steyning Town (9)	161
220	Cobham (9)	3–2	PFC Victoria London (11)	31
221	AFC Spelthorne Sports (11)	1–4	Spelthorne Sports (9)	94
222	Balham (9)	1–2	Rusthall (10)	52
223	Lancing (9)	3–2	Chessington & Hook United (10)	90
224	Erith Town (9)	2–2	Welling Town (9)	27
225	Midhurst & Easebourne (10)	3–1	Alfold (9)	48
226	Punjab United (9)	5–0	Selsey (10)	53
227	Sidlesham (10)	1–1	Stansfeld (10)	68
228	Lymington Town (9)	5–2 (a.e.t.)	Fawley (10)	54
230	Folland Sports (10)	0–1	East Cowes Victoria Athletic (10)	21
231	Alton (10)	2–1	Andover New Street (10)	94
233	Bashley (9)	3–0	Bridport (9)	135
234	Bemerton Heath Harlequins (10)	1–2 (a.e.t.)	Alresford Town (9)	43
235	Solent University (9)	2–7	Bradford Town (9)	53
236	United Services Portsmouth (10)	2–3	Sherborne Town (10)	43
237	Calne Town (10)	1–3	Downton (10)	63
238	New Milton Town (10)	1–4	AFC Portchester (9)	60
239	Andover Town (10)	1–4	Westbury United (9)	102
240	Swanage Town & Herston (11)	0–1	Dorchester Sports (11)	40
241	Devizes Town (10)	1–0	Stockbridge (11)	48
242	Cowes Sports (9)	2–0	Shaftesbury (9)	104
243	Ringwood Town (10)	1–1	Verwood Town (10)	86
244	Amesbury Town (9)	1–4	Christchurch (9)	42
245	Petersfield Town (10)	1–0	AFC Stoneham (9)	82
246	Pewsey Vale (10)	0–1	Laverstock & Ford (10)	70
247	Clevedon Town (9)	1–2	Roman Glass St. George (9)	70
248	Almondsbury (10)	2–4	Buckland Athletic (9)	30
249	Bishops Lydeard (10)	1–3	Bodmin Town (10)	44
250	Shepton Mallet (9)	4–0	Wellington AFC (9)	92
251	Bristol Telephones (10)	1–3	Falmouth Town (10)	50
252	Ivybridge Town (10)	4–1 (a.e.t.)	Bishop Sutton (10)	123
253	Cullompton Rangers (10)	2–0	Newquay (10)	73
254	St Blazey (10)	5–3	Godolphin Atlantic (10)	95
255	Elburton Villa (10)	1–5	Saltash United (10)	141
256	Keynsham Town (9)	0–1	Helston Athletic (10)	71
257	Tavistock (9)	4–1	Hallen (9)	111
258	Street (9)	3–0	Crediton United (10)	108
259	Hengrove Athletic (10)	0–1	Radstock Town (10)	44
260	Cadbury Heath (9)	3–0	Longwell Green Sports (10)	102
261	Wells City (10)	5–3 (a.e.t.)	Millbrook (10)	56
262	Welton Rovers (10)	0–4	Newton Abbot Spurs (10)	62
263	Bovey Tracey (10)	3–1	Liskeard Athletic (10)	63
264	Porthleven (10)	7–0	Callington Town (10)	76
265	Ilfracombe Town (10)	1–2	Torpoint Athletic (10)	96
266	Odd Down (9)	1–2 (a.e.t.)	Portishead Town (10)	45
267	Launceston (10)	0–2	Cheddar (10)	104
268	Exmouth Town (9)	3–2	Brislington (9)	169
Sunday 1 September 2019
16	Whickham (9)	1–2 (a.e.t.)	Squires Gate (9)	248
29	Worsbrough Bridge Athletic (10)	5–6	Hall Road Rangers (10)	116
32	Handsworth (9)	4–0	Shelley (10)	121
35	St. Helens Town (10)	1–2	Rossington Main (10)	70
42	Litherland REMYCA (9)	3–6 (a.e.t.)	Glasshoughton Welfare (10)	67
46	Emley (10)	1–1	Burscough (9)	177
63	Malvern Town (10)	1–1	Pershore Town (10)	
66	FC Stratford (11)	3–2	Chelmsley Town (10)	83
104	Saffron Dynamo (10)	0–2	Rainworth Miners Welfare (10)	215
107	Selston (9)	3–1	Teversal (10)	168
110	Downham Town (10)	0–4	Netherton United (11)	65
133	Benfleet (10)	2–5	Haverhill Rovers (9)	67
135	White Ensign (10)	3–0	Cornard United (10)	52
147	Irchester United (10)	0–3	North Greenford United (9)	40
148	Long Crendon (10)	4–3 (a.e.t.)	Langley (10)	24
159	Holyport (10)	3–2	Unite MK (11)	58
161	Chalvey Sports (10)	0–1	Wembley (9)	147
182	Wokingham & Emmbrook (10)	2–1 (a.e.t.)	Chipping Sodbury Town (9)	217
193	Tooting Bec (10)	2–4	Walton & Hersham (10)	112
196	Littlehampton United (11)	1–5	Bexhill United (10)	92
200	Littlehampton Town (10)	0–4	Tunbridge Wells (9)	130
209	Bagshot (10)	2–0	Broadbridge Heath (9)	44
211	Meridian Valley Park (10)	0–2	Hassocks (9)	30
Wednesday 4 September 2019
118	Park View (10)	1–4	West Essex (9)	30
Replays
Tuesday 3 September 2019
63R	Pershore Town (10)	0–2	Malvern Town (10)	207
157R	Aylesbury Vale Dynamos (9)	3–1	Leverstock Green (9)	78
172R	Fleet Town (9)	1–3	Ascot United (9)	153
186R	Greenwich Borough (9)	3–2	Banstead Athletic (9)	23
190R	Raynes Park Vale (9)	2–0 (a.e.t.)	Lydd Town (10)	33
219R	Steyning Town (9)	0–3	Peacehaven & Telscombe (9)	127
227R	Stansfeld (10)	1–3	Sidlesham (10)	68
243R	Verwood Town (10)	2–0	Ringwood Town (10)	77
Wednesday 4 September 2019
46R	Burscough (9)	1–2	Emley (10)	76
224R	Welling Town (9)	2–0	Erith Town (9)	48

== Second round qualifying ==
Tie	Home team (tier)	Score	Away team (tier)	Att.
Friday 13 September 2019
16	Skelmersdale United (9)	1–2	Wythenshawe Town (10)	71
32	Emley (10)	0–2	Winterton Rangers (10)	170
52	Smethwick (10)	0–1	Dudley Town (10)	200
86	New Salamis (10)	2–0	Tower Hamlets (9)	73
94	Broadfields United (9)	5–1	Hanworth Villa (9)	120
Saturday 14 September 2019
1	Thornaby (9)	2–1	Thackley (9)	89
2	Steeton (10)	2–3	Seaham Red Star (9)	63
3	Durham City (10)	0–2	Stockton Town (9)	193
4	Easington Colliery (10)	1–2	Shildon (9)	140
5	Ryton & Crawcrook Albion (10)	2–4	Yorkshire Amateur (9)	93
6	Esh Winning (10)	2–3	Billingham Town (9)	104
7	Jarrow (10)	2–1	Newton Aycliffe (9)	98
8	Sunderland West End (10)	0–1	Padiham (9)	58
9	Albion Sports (9)	1–5	Guisborough Town (9)	56
10	Northallerton Town (9)	2–3	Barnoldswick Town (9)	131
11	Squires Gate (9)	1–4	West Allotment Celtic (10)	52
12	Longridge Town (9)	3–1	AFC Blackpool (10)	183
13	Billingham Synthonia (10)	1–2	Knaresborough Town (9)	119
14	Garforth Town (9)	0–2	Ryhope Colliery Welfare (9)	139
15	Cleator Moor Celtic (10)	0–2	Crook Town (10)	103
17	Ashton Athletic (9)	5–1	Liversedge (9)	68
18	Chadderton (10)	3–2	Brigg Town (10)	126
19	Runcorn Town (9)	0–1	West Didsbury & Chorlton (10)	123
20	Cheadle Heath Nomads (10)	1–2	Vauxhall Motors (10)	59
21	Wythenshawe Amateurs (10)	1–3	Selby Town (10)	205
22	Grimsby Borough (9)	3–2	Dronfield Town (10)	41
23	Stockport Town (10)	1–2	Abbey Hey (10)	51
24	Lower Breck (10)	4–3	Pilkington (10)	92
26	Hall Road Rangers (10)	4–6	Maine Road (10)	38
27	Nostell Miners Welfare (10)	4–2	Barton Town (9)	76
28	Retford United (11)	2–4	Bottesford Town (9)	105
29	Rylands (9)	4–2	Rossington Main (10)	88
30	Cheadle Town (10)	4–0	East Hull (10)	56
31	Prestwich Heys (10)	2–3 (a.e.t.)	Charnock Richard (9)	117
33	Hinckley (10)	2–3	Rocester (10)	159
34	Shawbury United (10)	3–0	Gornal Athletic (11)	50
35	Malvern Town (10)	5–2	NKF Burbage (10)	72
36	Gresley (9)	3–2	FC Oswestry Town (10)	126
37	Tividale (9)	1–2	Droitwich Spa (11)	97
38	Heather St. John's (9)	5–2	Coventry Copsewood (10)	52
39	Abbey Hulton United (10)	2–2	Alsager Town (10)	55
40	FC Stratford (11)	2–2 (3–4 p)	GNP Sports (10)	64
41	Black Country Rangers (10)	0–8	Leicester Road (10)	41
42	Whitchurch Alport (9)	4–1	Nuneaton Griff (10)	168
43	Atherstone Town (10)	3–1	Paget Rangers (10)	175
44	Ashby Ivanhoe (10)	0–3	Sandbach United (10)	73
45	Boldmere St Michaels (9)	4–1	Willenhall Town (11)	104
46	Worcester City (9)	2–0	Highgate United (9)	304
47	Uttoxeter Town (10)	1–0	Wolverhampton Sporting (10)	53
48	Studley (10)	1–2	Racing Club Warwick (9)	54
49	Shifnal Town (10)	0–1	Haughmond (9)	87
50	Coventry Sphinx (9)	4–5	Hanley Town (9)	89
51	Lichfield City (10)	4–2	Wolverhampton Casuals (10)	55
53	Barrow Town (10)	3–2	St Andrews (10)	105
54	Dunkirk (10)	2–0	Anstey Nomads (9)	51
55	Clifton All Whites (10)	1–3	Holbeach United (9)	40
56	Newark Flowserve (9)	5–1	Skegness Town (10)	341
57	Loughborough University (9)	1–1	Ingles (10)	135
58	Quorn (9)	5–0	Shirebrook Town (10)	44
59	Blaby & Whetstone Athletic (11)	0–2	Kimberley Miners Welfare (10)	52
60	Blidworth Welfare (11)	0–5	Sherwood Colliery (10)	71
61	AFC Mansfield (9)	3–2	Rainworth Miners Welfare (10)	120
62	South Normanton Athletic (9)	2–1	Kirby Muxloe (10)	34
63	Long Eaton United (9)	3–0	Blackstones (10)	74
64	West Bridgford (10)	5–0	Selston (9)	80
65	Clay Cross Town (11)	2–2	Gedling Miners Welfare (10)	120
66	Heanor Town (10)	2–1	Birstall United (10)	104
67	Bourne Town (10)	1–2	Hucknall Town (10)	120
68	Harrowby United (10)	1–2	Cottesmore Amateurs (11)	75
69	Kirkley & Pakefield (9)	1–0	Debenham LC (10)	95
70	Huntingdon Town (10)	2–1	Mulbarton Wanderers (10)	48
71	Netherton United (11)	2–3	Wroxham (9)	105
72	Thetford Town (9)	0–5	Peterborough Northern Star (9)	82
73	March Town United (10)	4–3 (a.e.t.)	Walsham-le-Willows (9)	140
74	Mildenhall Town (9)	1–1	Newmarket Town (9)	230
75	Great Yarmouth Town (10)	0–3	Norwich United (9)	102
76	FC Clacton (9)	4–1	Redbridge (9)	145
77	Enfield (9)	2–1	Enfield Borough (10)	43
78	London Colney (9)	2–4	Baldock Town (9)	53
79	West Essex (9)	2–4	Brantham Athletic (9)	37
80	White Ensign (10)	3–0	Newbury Forest (10)	34
82	Langford (10)	1–1 (3–5 p)	Hackney Wick (10)	40
83	Whitton United (9)	2–1	St. Margaretsbury (9)	23
84	Takeley (9)	3–0	Wormley Rovers (10)	38
85	Lopes Tavares (10)	3–1	Catholic United (11)	20
87	Frenford (10)	3–2	Hashtag United (9)	129
88	Hadleigh United (9)	5–2	Haverhill Borough (10)	64
89	Colney Heath (9)	2–0	Haverhill Rovers (9)	114
90	FC Broxbourne Borough (10)	4–1	Wivenhoe Town (10)	29
91	Stanway Rovers (9)	7–1	Wodson Park (10)	82
93	Bedford (10)	0–4	Bedfont & Feltham (10)	32

Tie	Home team (tier)	Score	Away team (tier)	Att.
95	Harefield United (9)	1–3	Rothwell Corinthians (9)	55
96	Wembley (9)	1–3	Risborough Rangers (10)	55
97	Buckingham Athletic (10)	6–0	Hillingdon FC (11)	53
98	Harborough Town (9)	3–3	Hillingdon Borough (10)	126
99	Northampton ON Chenecks (9)	3–1	Northampton Sileby Rangers (10)	63
101	Wellingborough Town (9)	1–0	Holyport (10)	130
102	Raunds Town (10)	1–2	Flackwell Heath (9)	66
103	Aylesbury Vale Dynamos (9)	3–1	Rugby Borough (11)	71
104	North Greenford United (9)	0–2	Oxhey Jets (9)	56
106	Lutterworth Town (9)	6–0	Amersham Town (10)	44
107	Crawley Green (9)	4–0	Winslow United (10)	61
108	AFC Hayes (10)	2–0	London Tigers (10)	50
109	Abingdon United (10)	3–1	Reading City (9)	31
110	Fairford Town (9)	6–1	Shortwood United (10)	60
112	Frimley Green (9)	0–3	Ascot United (9)	98
113	Malmesbury Victoria (10)	2–1	Camberley Town (9)	164
114	Longlevens (9)	2–1	Newent Town (10)	48
115	Milton Keynes Robins (10)	4–1	Fleet Spurs (10)	50
116	Shrivenham (9)	2–2	Clanfield (10)	42
117	AFC Aldermaston (10)	1–3	Binfield (9)	66
118	Tadley Calleva (9)	1–0	Royal Wootton Bassett Town (9)	127
119	Sidlesham (10)	2–4 (a.e.t.)	Kennington (10)	42
120	Crawley Down Gatwick (9)	4–6	Mile Oak (10)	54
121	Midhurst & Easebourne (10)	0–2	Crowborough Athletic (9)	50
122	Hassocks (9)	1–6	Horley Town (9)	62
123	Seaford Town (10)	2–0	FC Deportivo Galicia (10)	54
124	Hollands & Blair (9)	1–2	Deal Town (9)	102
125	Westside (10)	3–2	Bexhill United (10)	30
126	Molesey (9)	A–A	Greenwich Borough (9)	50
Match abandoned tied 0-0, due to an injury to the Greenwich Borough goalkeeper.
128	Sporting Club Thamesmead (10)	3–1	Billingshurst (10)	40
129	Knaphill (9)	2–2	Tunbridge Wells (9)	119
130	Raynes Park Vale (9)	4–1	Walton & Hersham (10)	53
131	Beckenham Town (9)	6–0	Farnham Town (10)	55
132	Peacehaven & Telscombe (9)	3–2 (a.e.t.)	Spelthorne Sports (9)	152
133	Lancing (9)	7–0	Worthing United (10)	75
134	Arundel (10)	1–7	Welling Town (9)	62
135	Croydon (10)	1–3	Colliers Wood United (9)	133
136	Punjab United (9)	3–2	Loxwood (9)	32
137	Cobham (9)	2–4	Badshot Lea (9)	70
138	Lordswood (9)	0–1	Sheppey United (9)	110
139	Redhill (9)	4–3	Bagshot (10)	50
140	Snodland Town (10)	3–2	Bridon Ropes (10)	73
141	Rusthall (10)	2–1	Godalming Town (10)	148
142	K Sports (9)	0–3	Glebe (9)	48
143	Holmesdale (10)	0–1	Egham Town (9)	50
144	Corsham Town (10)	1–3	Romsey Town (10)	69
145	Bradford Town (9)	1–0	Hamble Club (9)	108
146	Hythe & Dibden (10)	2–3	AFC Portchester (9)	79
147	Alton (10)	1–2	Westbury United (9)	103
148	Devizes Town (10)	1–3	Newport IW (10)	52
149	Dorchester Sports (11)	2–4	Christchurch (9)	152
150	Bashley (9)	1–4	Lymington Town (9)	167
151	Warminster Town (10)	2–1	Alresford Town (9)	110
152	East Cowes Victoria Athletic (10)	3–2	Fareham Town (9)	50
153	Cowes Sports (9)	7–3	Verwood Town (10)	132
154	Laverstock & Ford (10)	0–4	Brockenhurst (9)	78
155	Sherborne Town (10)	2–2	Petersfield Town (10)	95
156	Downton (10)	2–1	Wincanton Town (10)	96
157	Camelford (10)	2–1	Ashton & Backwell United (10)	43
158	St Blazey (10)	1–3	Falmouth Town (10)	176
159	Cheddar (10)	0–5	Tavistock (9)	84
160	Shepton Mallet (9)	5–2	Street (9)	157
161	Cadbury Heath (9)	1–5	Exmouth Town (9)	82
162	Radstock Town (10)	2–3	Bovey Tracey (10)	44
163	Ivybridge Town (10)	2–3	Roman Glass St. George (9)	96
164	Sidmouth Town (10)	0–5	Cullompton Rangers (10)	96
165	Bodmin Town (10)	0–4	Buckland Athletic (9)	81
166	Wells City (10)	1–2	Newton Abbot Spurs (10)	72
167	Torpoint Athletic (10)	4–1 (a.e.t.)	Portishead Town (10)	109
168	Saltash United (10)	2–1	Porthleven (10)	112
169	Helston Athletic (10)	2–0	Axminster Town (10)	142
Sunday 15 September 2019
25	Handsworth (9)	1–2	Glasshoughton Welfare (10)	125
81	Coggeshall United (10)	1–0	Long Melford (9)	76
92	Long Crendon (10)	2–5	Leighton Town (9)	68
100	Cricklewood Wanderers (11)	1–4	Long Buckby (10)	79
105	Edgware Town (9)	0–2	Eynesbury Rovers (9)	83
111	Wokingham & Emmbrook (10)	0–1	Thornbury Town (10)	220
127	Erith & Belvedere (9)	9–2	Oakwood (10)	60
Tuesday 17 September 2019
126	Molesey (9)	0–2	Greenwich Borough (9)	38
Replays
Tuesday 17 September 2019
39R	Alsager Town (10)	3–1	Abbey Hulton United (10)	102
65R	Gedling Miners Welfare (10)	2–3	Clay Cross Town (11)	91
74R	Newmarket Town (9)	3–3 (6–7 p)	Mildenhall Town (9)	215
98R	Hillingdon Borough (10)	1–2	Harborough Town (9)	55
116R	Clanfield (10)	1–5	Shrivenham (9)	46
129R	Tunbridge Wells (9)	5–1	Knaphill (9)	119
155R	Petersfield Town (10)	1–0	Sherborne Town (10)	92
Thursday 19 September 2019
57R	Ingles (10)	1–2 (a.e.t.)	Loughborough University (9)	180

== First round proper ==
Tie	Home team (tier)	Score	Away team (tier)	Att.
Friday 11 October 2019
35	Haughmond (9)	1–3 (a.e.t.)	Loughborough University (9)	61
58	Biggleswade United (9)	4–4 (a.e.t.)	Saffron Walden Town (9)	184
73	Sporting Club Thamesmead (10)	1–5	Ascot United (9)	105
Saturday 12 October 2019
1	Jarrow (10)	1–2 (a.e.t.)	Vauxhall Motors (10)	289
2	Bottesford Town (9)	4–2 (a.e.t.)	West Allotment Celtic (10)	63
3	Nostell Miners Welfare (10)	0–2	Wythenshawe Town (10)	73
4	Seaham Red Star (9)	1–3	Yorkshire Amateur (9)	121
5	Thornaby (9)	4–0	Billingham Town (9)	400
6	Shildon (9)	2–0	West Didsbury & Chorlton (10)	257
7	Longridge Town (9)	4–2	Crook Town (10)	230
8	Knaresborough Town (9)	2–3 (a.e.t.)	Stockton Town (9)	503
9	Penistone Church (9)	1–2	Bridlington Town (9)	493
10	Rylands (9)	3–0	Bootle (9)	181
11	Selby Town (10)	5–1	Cheadle Town (10)	336
12	Padiham (9)	0–1	Bishop Auckland (9)	283
13	Abbey Hey (10)	0–5	Barnoldswick Town (9)	165
14	Ryhope Colliery Welfare (9)	2–0	Ashton Athletic (9)	74
15	Chadderton (10)	1–3	Guisborough Town (9)	138
16	Winterton Rangers (10)	2–5	Consett (9)	154
17	Maine Road (10)	4–2 (a.e.t.)	Glasshoughton Welfare (10)	130
18	Charnock Richard (9)	2–5	Lower Breck (10)	185
19	Grimsby Borough (9)	4–0	Hemsworth Miners Welfare (9)	90
20	Leicester Road (10)	1–2 (a.e.t.)	Walsall Wood (9)	82
21	Droitwich Spa (11)	2–0	Whitchurch Alport (9)	203
22	Newark Flowserve (9)	2–1	Heather St. John's (9)	322
23	GNP Sports (10)	2–4 (a.e.t.)	Malvern Town (10)	70
24	Alsager Town (10)	1–2	Lutterworth Town (9)	85
25	South Normanton Athletic (9)	1–0	Holbeach United (9)	68
26	Kimberley Miners Welfare (10)	0–4	Sherwood Colliery (10)	72
27	Lichfield City (10)	1–2 (a.e.t.)	Dudley Town (10)	158
28	Atherstone Town (10)	3–1	Sandbach United (10)	275
29	Brackley Town Saints (9)	2–3 (a.e.t.)	West Bridgford (10)	128
30	Shawbury United (10)	0–0	Uttoxeter Town (10)	76
31	Heanor Town (10)	3–0	Boldmere St Michaels (9)	160
32	Gresley (9)	0–1	Rugby Town (9)	205
33	Pinchbeck United (9)	0–3	Worcester City (9)	84
34	AFC Mansfield (9)	2–1 (a.e.t.)	Hanley Town (9)	84
36	Dunkirk (10)	2–1	Hucknall Town (10)	113
37	Racing Club Warwick (9)	2–3	Long Eaton United (9)	148
38	Clay Cross Town (11)	3–1	Cottesmore Amateurs (11)	220
39	Barrow Town (10)	1–2	Congleton Town (9)	91
40	Quorn (9)	5–3	Rocester (10)	92
41	New Salamis (10)	1–6	Eynesbury Rovers (9)	56
42	March Town United (10)	0–1	Rothwell Corinthians (9)	144
43	Stansted (9)	5–1	Aylesbury Vale Dynamos (9)	80
44	Risborough Rangers (10)	0–2	FC Clacton (9)	316
45	Tring Athletic (9)	1–3	Woodbridge Town (9)	156
46	Broadfields United (9)	1–3	Walthamstow (9)	48
47	Mildenhall Town (9)	4–1	Crawley Green (9)	145
48	Norwich United (9)	4–1 (a.e.t.)	Peterborough Northern Star (9)	131
49	AFC Hayes (10)	1–3	FC Broxbourne Borough (10)	73
50	Flackwell Heath (9)	2–3 (a.e.t.)	Colney Heath (9)	67
51	Leighton Town (9)	2–1	Hadleigh United (9)	180
53	Hadley (9)	0–2	Milton Keynes Robins (10)	56
54	Wroxham (9)	6–2	Baldock Town (9)	155
55	Northampton ON Chenecks (9)	2–3 (a.e.t.)	Kirkley & Pakefield (9)	63
56	Whitton United (9)	1–3	Long Buckby (10)	57
57	Huntingdon Town (10)	2–3 (a.e.t.)	Frenford (10)	48
59	Wellingborough Town (9)	4–3	Takeley (9)	150
60	Oxhey Jets (9)	7–0	Hackney Wick (10)	57
61	Harborough Town (9)	4–1	Enfield (9)	236
62	Coggeshall United (10)	1–0	Brantham Athletic (9)	64
63	Lopes Tavares (10)	2–3	Stanway Rovers (9)	20

Tie	Home team (tier)	Score	Away team (tier)	Att.
65	Chatham Town (9)	1–1	Beckenham Town (9)	425
66	Egham Town (9)	P–P	Binfield (9)	NA
67	Raynes Park Vale (9)	A–A	Horndean (9)	42
Match abandoned 68th minute tied 0-0 due to waterlogged pitch.
68	Sheppey United (9)	0–2	Corinthian (9)	168
69	Peacehaven & Telscombe (9)	3–5	Glebe (9)	210
70	Welling Town (9)	5–1	Erith & Belvedere (9)	48
72	Bedfont & Feltham (10)	3–1	Colliers Wood United (9)	53
74	Fisher (9)	3–0	Greenwich Borough (9)	175
76	Punjab United (9)	0–3	Newhaven (9)	42
77	Mile Oak (10)	1–2	Redhill (9)	112
78	Seaford Town (10)	1–0	Horley Town (9)	88
79	Rusthall (10)	0–2	Lancing (9)	208
80	Sutton Common Rovers (9)	5–1	Snodland Town (10)	61
81	Eastbourne Town (9)	4–2	Horsham YMCA (9)	182
82	Christchurch (9)	3–1	Brimscombe & Thrupp (9)	89
83	Bradford Town (9)	1–0	Lymington Town (9)	122
84	Cullompton Rangers (10)	0–1	AFC Portchester (9)	86
85	Newport IW (10)	0–2	Bridgwater Town (9)	144
86	Westbury United (9)	0–1	Badshot Lea (9)	71
87	Malmesbury Victoria (10)	3–5	Roman Glass St. George (9)	127
88	Torpoint Athletic (10)	1–4	Saltash United (10)	189
89	Tavistock (9)	4–1	Shepton Mallet (9)	112
90	Warminster Town (10)	3–2	East Cowes Victoria Athletic (10)	133
91	Bitton (9)	P–P	Tadley Calleva (9)	NA
92	Bournemouth (9)	P–P	Petersfield Town (10)	NA
93	Longlevens (9)	1–0 (a.e.t.)	Cowes Sports (9)	70
94	Romsey Town (10)	P–P	Plymouth Parkway (9)	NA
95	Bishop's Cleeve (9)	2–3	Brockenhurst (9)	120
96	Helston Athletic (10)	1–5	Falmouth Town (10)	689
97	Camelford (10)	1–2	Buckland Athletic (9)	116
98	Bovey Tracey (10)	P–P	Abingdon United (10)	NA
99	Downton (10)	0–4	Thornbury Town (10)	141
100	Shrivenham (9)	2–3	Fairford Town (9)	83
101	Exmouth Town (9)	2–0	Portland United (9)	211
102	Newton Abbot Spurs (10)	0–8	Westfields (9)	200
Sunday 13 October 2019
52	White Ensign (10)	4–1	Buckingham Athletic (10)	90
64	Southall (9)	4–4	Tunbridge Wells (9)	95
71	Westside (10)	P–P	Deal Town (9)	NA
75	Kennington (10)	4–2	Crowborough Athletic (9)	277
Tuesday 15 October 2019
66	Egham Town (9)	0–4	Binfield (9)	73
67	Raynes Park Vale (9)	2–2	Horndean (9)	49
91	Bitton (9)	6–1	Tadley Calleva (9)	135
92	Bournemouth (9)	1–2	Petersfield Town (10)	87
Wednesday 16 October 2019
71	Westside (10)	P–P	Deal Town (9)	NA
94	Romsey Town (10)	1–3	Plymouth Parkway (9)	123
Saturday 19 October 2019
98	Bovey Tracey (10)	P–P	Abingdon United (10)	NA
Wednesday 23 October 2019
71	Westside (10)	3–4	Deal Town (9)	44
Saturday 26 October 2019
98	Bovey Tracey (10)	3–1	Abingdon United (10)	93
Bovey Tracey were removed from the competition for fielding an ineligible player.
Replays
Tuesday 15 October 2019
30R	Uttoxeter Town (10)	4–0	Shawbury United (10)	148
58R	Saffron Walden Town (9)	5–1	Biggleswade United (9)	209
64R	Tunbridge Wells (9)	1–3	Southall (9)	130
Wednesday 16 October 2019
65R	Beckenham Town (9)	2–2 (6–7 p)	Chatham Town (9)	230
Tuesday 22 October 2019
67R	Horndean (9)	1–2	Raynes Park Vale (9)	53

== Second round proper ==
Tie	Home team (tier)	Score	Away team (tier)	Att.
Saturday 2 November 2019
1	Selby Town (10)	P–P	Bridlington Town (9)	NA
2	Bishop Auckland (9)	0–1 (a.e.t.)	West Auckland Town (9)	517
3	Hebburn Town (9)	3–0	Sunderland RCA (9)	312
4	Irlam (9)	2–5	Consett (9)	181
5	Congleton Town (9)	3–2	Maine Road (10)	144
6	Stockton Town (9)	2–0	Barnoldswick Town (9)	627
7	Northwich Victoria (9)	5–5	Wythenshawe Town (10)	202
8	Lower Breck (10)	2–1	Shildon (9)	162
9	Vauxhall Motors (10)	4–1	Ryhope Colliery Welfare (9)	123
10	Yorkshire Amateur (9)	5–4	Bottesford Town (9)	55
11	Newcastle Benfield (9)	4–0	Guisborough Town (9)	235
12	Rylands (9)	0–1	Grimsby Borough (9)	87
13	Longridge Town (9)	6–4	Thornaby (9)	219
14	Newark Flowserve (9)	3–0	Rugby Town (9)	394
15	Lye Town (9)	2–1	Droitwich Spa (11)	205
16	Wellingborough Town (9)	1–0	Dudley Town (10)	112
17	Malvern Town (10)	P–P	Loughborough University (9)	NA
18	Lutterworth Town (9)	P–P	Eastwood Community (10)	NA
19	AFC Mansfield (9)	3–1	Long Buckby (10)	72
20	Walsall Wood (9)	P–P	Uttoxeter Town (10)	NA
21	Leicester Nirvana (9)	P–P	Westfields (9)	NA
22	West Bridgford (10)	0–2	Heanor Town (10)	203
23	Sporting Khalsa (9)	3–1	Quorn (9)	120
24	Coventry United (9)	1–0	Long Eaton United (9)	125
25	Clay Cross Town (11)	P–P	Sherwood Colliery (10)	NA
26	Worcester City (9)	P–P	Dunkirk (10)	NA
27	Harborough Town (9)	1–6	Atherstone Town (10)	343
28	Shepshed Dynamo (9)	P–P	Cadbury Athletic (10)	NA
29	South Normanton Athletic (9)	P–P	Rothwell Corinthians (9)	NA
31	Woodbridge Town (9)	5–2	Godmanchester Rovers (9)	139
32	Norwich United (9)	1–2	Kirkley & Pakefield (9)	73
33	Stansted (9)	1–0	Mildenhall Town (9)	142
34	Newport Pagnell Town (9)	4–2	Coggeshall United (10)	106
35	Saffron Walden Town (9)	3–4	FC Clacton (9)	235
36	Leighton Town (9)	6–1	FC Broxbourne Borough (10)	152
37	Deeping Rangers (9)	1–3	Stanway Rovers (9)	116
38	Milton Keynes Robins (10)	1–6	Eynesbury Rovers (9)	124
39	Colney Heath (9)	0–1	Stowmarket Town (9)	172
40	Fisher (9)	1–2	Glebe (9)	116
41	Abbey Rangers (9)	P–P	Ascot United (9)	NA
42	Frenford (10)	1–3	Lancing (9)	58
43	Raynes Park Vale (9)	0–4	Sutton Common Rovers (9)	52
Match played at Sutton Common Rovers.
44	Binfield (9)	3–1	Redhill (9)	92
45	Walthamstow (9)	2–3	AFC Uckfield Town (9)	74
46	Corinthian (9)	2–0	Canterbury City (9)	71
47	Windsor (9)	1–7	Eastbourne Town (9)	171
48	Deal Town (9)	4–1	Oxhey Jets (9)	148
50	Welling Town (9)	3–1 (a.e.t.)	Bedfont & Feltham (10)	48
51	Bearsted (9)	P–P	Chatham Town (9)	NA
52	Kennington (10)	1–6	Newhaven (9)	199
53	Warminster Town (10)	3–1	AFC Portchester (9)	222
54	Baffins Milton Rovers (9)	P–P	Bradford Town (9)	NA

Tie	Home team (tier)	Score	Away team (tier)	Att.
55	Falmouth Town (10)	3–2 (a.e.t.)	Longlevens (9)	486
56	AFC St Austell (10)	0–1	Buckland Athletic (9)	213
57	Tavistock (9)	P–P	Exmouth Town (9)	NA
58	Saltash United (10)	P–P	Bridgwater Town (9)	NA
59	Brockenhurst (9)	0–3	Plymouth Parkway (9)	181
61	Christchurch (9)	P–P	Badshot Lea (9)	NA
62	Petersfield Town (10)	P–P	Roman Glass St. George (9)	NA
63	Abingdon United (10)	1–6	Hamworthy United (9)	
64	Bitton (9)	P–P	Fairford Town (9)	NA
Sunday 3 November 2019
30	White Ensign (10)	A–A	Wroxham (9)	
Match abandoned in the 75th minute due to floodlight failure with Wroxham leading 3-0.
49	Southall (9)	3–1	Seaford Town (10)	96
60	Thornbury Town (10)	1–3 (a.e.t.)	Cribbs (9)	222
Tuesday 5 November 2019
1	Selby Town (10)	P–P	Bridlington Town (9)	NA
18	Lutterworth Town (9)	4–2 (a.e.t.)	Eastwood Community (10)	75
20	Walsall Wood (9)	3–1	Uttoxeter Town (10)	95
21	Leicester Nirvana (9)	P–P	Westfields (9)	NA
25	Clay Cross Town (11)	3–1	Sherwood Colliery (10)	188
28	Shepshed Dynamo (9)	4–1	Cadbury Athletic (10)	128
29	South Normanton Athletic (9)	P–P	Rothwell Corinthians (9)	NA
41	Abbey Rangers (9)	2–2	Ascot United (9)	63
61	Christchurch (9)	2–1	Badshot Lea (9)	101
62	Petersfield Town (10)	1–2	Roman Glass St. George (9)	137
64	Bitton (9)	4–0	Fairford Town (9)	106
Wednesday 6 November 2019
17	Malvern Town (10)	P–P	Loughborough University (9)	NA
26	Worcester City (9)	3–1	Dunkirk (10)	187
30	White Ensign (10)	2–5	Wroxham (9)	172
Match played at Wroxham.
51	Bearsted (9)	P–P	Chatham Town (9)	NA
54	Baffins Milton Rovers (9)	2–3	Bradford Town (9)	86
57	Tavistock (9)	6–1	Exmouth Town (9)	106
58	Saltash United (10)	P–P	Bridgwater Town (9)	NA
Tuesday 12 November 2019
1	Selby Town (10)	P–P	Bridlington Town (9)	NA
21	Leicester Nirvana (9)	1–2	Westfields (9)	93
29	South Normanton Athletic (9)	P–P	Rothwell Corinthians (9)	NA
51	Bearsted (9)	0–1	Chatham Town (9)	141
Wednesday 13 November 2019
17	Malvern Town (10)	5–4 (a.e.t.)	Loughborough University (9)	387
58	Saltash United (10)	0–2 (a.e.t.)	Bridgwater Town (9)	103
Match played at Bridgwater Town.
Tuesday 19 November 2019
1	Selby Town (10)	2–4	Bridlington Town (9)	181
Match played at Bridlington Town.
29	South Normanton Athletic (9)	3–1	Rothwell Corinthians (9)	58
Match played at Rothwell Corinthians.
Replays
Tuesday 5 November 2019
7R	Wythenshawe Town (10)	2–1	Northwich Victoria (9)	262
Tuesday 12 November 2019
41R	Ascot United (9)	7–0	Abbey Rangers (9)	106

== Third round proper ==
Tie	Home team (tier)	Score	Away team (tier)	Att.
Saturday 30 November 2019
1	Bridlington Town (9)	1–4 (a.e.t.)	Stockton Town (9)	417
2	Vauxhall Motors (10)	2–0	Newcastle Benfield (9)	134
3	Lower Breck (10)	1–5	Hebburn Town (9)	152
4	Wythenshawe Town (10)	1–1 (a.e.t.)	Consett (9)	302
5	Congleton Town (9)	2–2 (a.e.t.)	Longridge Town (9)	225
6	West Auckland Town (9)	2–1	Yorkshire Amateur (9)	241
8	Westfields (9)	1–3	Lutterworth Town (9)	126
10	Heanor Town (10)	2–4	Sporting Khalsa (9)	113
11	Lye Town (9)	0–2	Walsall Wood (9)	115
12	Malvern Town (10)	3–3 (a.e.t.)	Atherstone Town (10)	360
13	AFC Mansfield (9)	P–P	Newark Flowserve (9)	NA
14	South Normanton Athletic (9)	2–1 (a.e.t.)	Clay Cross Town (11)	131
15	Newport Pagnell Town (9)	0–2	Kirkley & Pakefield (9)	117
16	Wroxham (9)	1–0 (a.e.t.)	Wellingborough Town (9)	185
17	Woodbridge Town (9)	1–1 (a.e.t.)	Stanway Rovers (9)	193
18	Stowmarket Town (9)	4–0	Stansted (9)	429
19	FC Clacton (9)	1–2	Eynesbury Rovers (9)	103
20	Chatham Town (9)	1–0	Welling Town (9)	281
21	Deal Town (9)	2–0	Southall (9)	296
22	Glebe (9)	1–0	Newhaven (9)	60
23	Corinthian (9)	2–1	Ascot United (9)	75
24	Lancing (9)	3–3 (a.e.t.)	Sutton Common Rovers (9)	149

Tie	Home team (tier)	Score	Away team (tier)	Att.
25	Leighton Town (9)	2–1	Eastbourne Town (9)	426
26	Binfield (9)	4–0	AFC Uckfield Town (9)	133
27	Bradford Town (9)	4–3 (a.e.t.)	Bridgwater Town (9)	148
28	Bitton (9)	2–1	Cribbs (9)	70
29	Hamworthy United (9)	1–4	Plymouth Parkway (9)	102
30	Christchurch (9)	2–1	Falmouth Town (10)	238
31	Tavistock (9)	1–2	Buckland Athletic (9)	105
Sunday 1 December 2019
7	Coventry United (9)	4–2	Grimsby Borough (9)	122
9	Worcester City (9)	2–1 (a.e.t.)	Shepshed Dynamo (9)	344
32	Roman Glass St. George (9)	1–2	Warminster Town (10)	140
Tuesday 3 December 2019
13	AFC Mansfield (9)	1–3	Newark Flowserve (9)	145
Replays
Tuesday 3 December 2019
17R	Stanway Rovers (9)	0–4	Woodbridge Town (9)	140
Wednesday 4 December 2019
5R	Longridge Town (9)	2–0	Congleton Town (9)	125
12R	Atherstone Town (10)	10–0	Malvern Town (10)	222
Saturday 7 December 2019
4R	Consett (9)	1–0	Wythenshawe Town (10)	404
24R	Sutton Common Rovers (9)	1–0	Lancing (9)	

== Fourth round proper ==
Tie	Home team (tier)	Score	Away team (tier)	Att.
Saturday 11 January 2020
2	Stockton Town (9)	0–1	Atherstone Town (10)	719
3	Vauxhall Motors (10)	0–1	Hebburn Town (9)	175
4	Longridge Town (9)	5–1	Newark Flowserve (9)	215
5	Consett (9)	3–1	Lutterworth Town (9)	392
6	West Auckland Town (9)	1–0	Walsall Wood (9)	230
7	South Normanton Athletic (9)	1–3	Wroxham (9)	172
8	Sporting Khalsa (9)	2–0 (a.e.t.)	Kirkley & Pakefield (9)	121
9	Stowmarket Town (9)	3–0	Glebe (9)	510
10	Chatham Town (9)	1–2 (a.e.t.)	Corinthian (9)	528
11	Eynesbury Rovers (9)	3–4	Leighton Town (9)	469
12	Deal Town (9)	1–1	Binfield (9)	507

Tie	Home team (tier)	Score	Away team (tier)	Att.
13	Bitton (9)	3–1	Warminster Town (10)	199
14	Woodbridge Town (9)	0–1	Plymouth Parkway (9)	
15	Buckland Athletic (9)	1–2	Bradford Town (9)	174
16	Christchurch (9)	1–2	Sutton Common Rovers (9)	
Sunday 12 January 2020
1	Worcester City (9)	P–P	Coventry United (9)	
Wednesday 15 January 2020
1	Worcester City (9)	2–1	Coventry United (9)	452
Replays
Saturday 18 January 2020
12R	Binfield (9)	3–3 (6–7 p)	Deal Town (9)	346

== Fifth round proper ==
Tie	Home team (tier)	Score	Away team (tier)	Att.
Saturday 8 February 2020
1	Corinthian (9)	3–0	Sporting Khalsa (9)	246
2	Bradford Town (9)	1–3	Leighton Town (9)	463
3	Consett (9)	2–0	Deal Town (9)	866
4	Plymouth Parkway (9)	2–1	West Auckland Town (9)	671
5	Longridge Town (9)	0–1 (a.e.t.)	Hebburn Town (9)	692
6	Wroxham (9)	2–0	Stowmarket Town (9)	1,041
7	Bitton (9)	2–1	Sutton Common Rovers (9)	209
8	Atherstone Town (10)	1–1	Worcester City (9)	842
Replays
Wednesday 12 February 2020
8R	Worcester City (9)	1–1 (4–5 p)	Atherstone Town (10)	

== Quarter-finals ==
Tie	Home team (tier)	Score	Away team (tier)	Att.
Saturday 29 February 2020
1	Corinthian (9)	P–P	Leighton Town (9)	NA
2	Wroxham (9)	0–4	Bitton (9)	
3	Atherstone Town (10)	P–P	Consett (9)	NA
4	Hebburn Town (9)	2–0	Plymouth Parkway (9)	1,705
Saturday 7 March 2020
1	Corinthian (9)	4–3	Leighton Town (9)	351
3	Atherstone Town (10)	1–3 (a.e.t.)	Consett (9)	950

== Semi-finals ==
Originally scheduled for March 2020, the two-legged semi-finals were postponed due to the COVID-19 pandemic. The FA declared their intention to complete the tournament, but with an uncertain timeframe. In late August 2020, they scheduled the semi-finals as single matches in September, with a date of 27 September for the final at Wembley. The final, alongside the FA Trophy final held as part of the same event, was to be among the matches trialling the return of spectators to elite football after the height of the first wave of the pandemic in the UK, but this was further postponed following new restrictions on gatherings in England that were enacted on 14 September 2020 as COVID-19 cases increased.

5 September 2020
15:00

Consett (9)	1–0 (a.e.t.)	Bitton (9)
Smith 115'

Belle View Stadium, Consett
Attendance: 150

5 September 2020
15:00

Corinthian (9)	2–2 (a.e.t.)	Hebburn Town (9)
Housego 48' (pen.); Billings 109' (pen.)		Armstrong 89' (pen.), 100'
Penalties
Johnson (penalty scored); Billings (penalty scored); Snelling (penalty scored); Bath (penalty missed); Clarke (penalty missed)	3–4	(penalty scored) Suddick; (penalty scored) Storey; (penalty scored) Potter; (penalty scored) Taylor

Gay Dawn Farm, Hartley
Attendance: 350

== Final ==
The final was finally scheduled to be played behind closed doors on 3 May 2021, after the date of 27 September 2020 was abandoned with the hope of allowing fans into the stadium.

3 May 2021
13:00 BST

Consett	2–3	Hebburn Town
Alshabeeb 18'; Pearson 42'	Report	Purewal 19'; Richardson 44'; Martin 82'

Wembley Stadium, London
Attendance: 0
Referee: Michael Salisbury
