= 2019–20 Southern Football League =

The 2019–20 Southern Football League season (known as the BetVictor Southern League, following a sponsorship deal with BetVictor) was the 117th in the history of the Southern League since its establishment in 1894. The league has two Premier divisions (Central and South) at step 3 of the National League System (NLS) and two Division One divisions (Central and South) at step 4 of the NLS. These correspond with Levels 7 and 8 of the English football league system.

As a result of the COVID-19 pandemic, this season's competition was formally abandoned on 26 March 2020, with all results from the season being expunged, and no promotion or relegation taking place to, from, or within the competition. On 30 March 2020, sixty-six non-league clubs sent an open letter to the Football Association requesting that they reconsider their decision. A legal appeal against the decision, funded by South Shields of the Northern Premier League, was dismissed in June 2020.

== Premier Division Central ==
Southern Football League Premier Division Central
- Season: 2019–20
- Champions: Peterborough Sports
- Matches: 349
- Goals: 1,112 (3.19 per match)
- Top goalscorer: 24 goals - Michael Taylor (Bromsgrove Sporting)
- Highest attendance: 1,764 Bromsgrove Sporting 1–0 Tamworth
- Total attendance: 124,074
- Average attendance: 356 (-0.9% to previous season)

The Premier Division Central consisted of 17 clubs from the previous season, and five new clubs:

- Bromsgrove Sporting, promoted from Division One Central
- Hednesford Town, transferred from the Northern Premier League Premier Division
- Kings Langley, transferred from the Premier Division South
- Nuneaton Borough, relegated from the National League North
- Peterborough Sports, promoted from Division One Central

=== League table ===
Pos	Team	Pld	W	D	L	GF	GA	GD	Pts
1	Peterborough Sports (C)	33	19	8	6	90	46	+44	65
2	Tamworth	30	21	2	7	63	27	+36	65
3	Royston Town	30	19	6	5	62	28	+34	63
4	Bromsgrove Sporting	32	17	6	9	80	43	+37	57
5	Rushall Olympic	33	15	8	10	58	43	+15	53
6	Stourbridge	32	16	5	11	53	52	+1	53
7	Banbury United	32	14	10	8	48	31	+17	52
8	Coalville Town	30	14	9	7	51	32	+19	51
9	Nuneaton Borough	33	14	8	11	57	46	+11	50
10	Kings Langley	30	15	5	10	51	41	+10	50
11	AFC Rushden & Diamonds	30	14	7	9	50	45	+5	49
12	Barwell	32	14	6	12	58	54	+4	48
13	Needham Market	33	13	9	11	43	40	+3	48
14	Hednesford Town	32	14	5	13	50	44	+6	47
15	Biggleswade Town	30	13	4	13	44	45	−1	43
16	Lowestoft Town	33	13	2	18	48	62	−14	41
17	Hitchin Town	32	10	9	13	43	49	−6	39
18	Stratford Town	33	8	4	21	42	74	−32	28
19	Leiston	32	6	8	18	39	87	−48	26
20	St Ives Town	33	6	5	22	33	76	−43	23
21	Alvechurch	30	4	5	21	25	58	−33	17
22	Redditch United	33	3	3	27	24	89	−65	12

Updated to match(es) played on 10 March 2020. Source: Southern League website, Non League Matters
Rules for classification: 1) Points; 2) Goal difference; 3) Number of goals scored; 4) Number of matches won; 5) Head-to-head results
(C) Champions

=== Results ===
Home \ Away	ALV	BAN	BAR	BIG	BRO	COA	HED	HIT	KLL	LEI	LOW	NEE	NUN	PSP	RED	ROY	RUD	RUS	STI	STO	STR	TAM
Alvechurch	—		2–2	1–1	1–4		0–1	5–0		0–0		1–2	0–2	2–2	0–2	0–1	1–2		1–0	0–3		0–2
Banbury United	2–1	—	2–1	3–2	0–1	1–1		0–0	1–2			4–2	1–1	0–2	4–2	2–0	2–1		1–0	2–0	5–0	0–1
Barwell	2–1	2–1	—	3–1	1–3		4–4		3–1	5–0	0–3	1–0	0–1	2–0		3–2	0–2	0–0	1–0			1–2
Biggleswade Town				—	2–4		1–0	2–0			3–0		2–0	0–3	3–1	0–5	3–1		2–0	1–2	0–1	2–1
Bromsgrove Sporting		0–2	1–4	1–1	—	0–3	4–0	1–2	4–1		6–0	0–1	1–3		7–1	1–1	0–0	1–1	3–2	4–1		1–0
Coalville Town		1–1	4–1	2–0	2–2	—	2–1	1–2	3–0	1–1		0–1	5–3	1–2		1–4	1–0	2–0	1–2		1–1	
Hednesford Town	3–0	2–0				0–1	—	4–2	1–3		2–1	0–1	0–3	3–3	4–0	4–1	1–1			1–2	1–0	0–3
Hitchin Town	3–1	0–0	4–1		2–2	1–0		—	0–1		1–3	0–0	1–1	0–2			1–1	1–2		1–2	2–0	0–3
Kings Langley			1–1	2–1	3–1		0–2	3–1	—	1–2		2–2	2–0	2–2		0–1	1–0	4–0		1–4	1–0	
Leiston	1–2	1–5	1–1	0–4	0–8	1–1	0–3	3–1	0–4	—		2–1	1–1	2–4			2–3	2–2	4–4	0–1		1–2
Lowestoft Town	4–0	0–0	3–2	2–1	0–1	2–1	0–2		2–1	1–3	—	0–2	0–2		6–0	0–1		0–0	1–0	2–1	2–0	
Needham Market	1–1	0–1	2–3	0–1	0–3		4–3	1–1		3–0	1–0	—	1–3	2–1	2–2			1–1	1–1	3–3	1–0	
Nuneaton Borough	3–2	2–2	3–1	2–2		0–0			0–3		4–1	1–0	—	0–3	3–0	2–2	0–1	1–3	4–0	4–0	2–0	
Peterborough Sports	3–0	1–3	5–4	1–1	3–2			0–4	2–2	8–1	3–1	0–0	2–1	—	7–0			1–1	5–0	2–2	6–0	4–2
Redditch United	2–3	0–0	0–1	0–2		2–3	0–1	0–2	0–2	0–6	5–3	0–3	3–2		—		1–1	0–3	0–1		0–2	0–2
Royston Town	3–0	1–0		3–0		1–1	1–0	1–1		0–0	5–1	1–0		4–1	2–1	—		2–1	5–0	3–1	3–2	1–2
AFC Rushden & Diamonds		2–1	3–1		2–8	0–3	1–1			5–1	3–0	1–2	2–0		3–0	1–1	—		1–0	3–2	4–2	
Rushall Olympic	2–0	1–1	0–1	3–2		0–2	1–0	4–2	0–1	6–0	4–1			0–2	3–1	1–3	1–1	—	4–3	2–0	4–1	
St Ives Town				0–3		1–2	1–1	0–3	2–1	1–0	2–5		2–0	0–3	2–1	0–4	3–4	2–4	—	0–2	2–2	1–1
Stourbridge	1–0	1–1	1–1		2–1	1–1	0–3	1–2	1–3	5–1	2–0			1–6	1–0			2–1	3–1	—	3–1	
Stratford Town	2–0		1–5	1–2	1–2	1–4	4–1	3–3	3–3	3–1	0–3	2–1			2–0		3–1	1–2		1–2	—	1–3
Tamworth	2–0			4–0	1–3		0–1	1–0	2–0	1–2	4–1	1–2	3–3	3–1	3–0	2–0	3–0	2–1	3–0		4–1	—

Updated to match(es) played on 10 March 2020. Source: Southern Football League
Legend: Blue = home team win; Yellow = draw; Red = away team win.

=== Stadia and locations ===
Locations of the Premier Division Central clubs

Club	Location	Stadium	Capacity
AFC Rushden & Diamonds	Rushden	Hayden Road	2,000
Alvechurch	Alvechurch	Lye Meadow	3,000
Banbury United	Banbury	Spencer Stadium	2,000
Barwell	Barwell	Kirkby Road	2,500
Biggleswade Town	Biggleswade	Langford Road	3,000
Bromsgrove Sporting	Bromsgrove	Victoria Ground	4,893
Coalville Town	Coalville	Owen Street Sports Ground	2,000
Hednesford Town	Hednesford	Keys Park	6,039
Hitchin Town	Hitchin	Top Field	4,554
Kings Langley	Kings Langley	Sadiku Stadium	1,963
Leiston	Leiston	Victory Road	2,250
Lowestoft Town	Lowestoft	Crown Meadow	3,000
Needham Market	Needham Market	Bloomfields	4,000
Nuneaton Borough	Nuneaton	Liberty Way	4,614
Peterborough Sports	Peterborough	Lincoln Road	2,300
Redditch United	Redditch	The Valley	5,000
Royston Town	Royston	Garden Walk	5,000
Rushall Olympic	Walsall (Rushall)	Dales Lane	2,000
St Ives Town	St Ives	Westwood Road	2,000
Stourbridge	Stourbridge	War Memorial Athletic Ground	2,626
Stratford Town	Stratford-upon-Avon	Knights Lane	2,000
Tamworth	Tamworth	The Lamb Ground	4,565

== Premier Division South ==
Southern Football League Premier Division South
- Season: 2019–20
- Champions: Truro City
- Matches: 341
- Goals: 1,042 (3.06 per match)
- Top goalscorer: 19 goals - Tyler Harvey (Truro City)
- Highest attendance: 1,068 Taunton Town 3–1 Tiverton
- Total attendance: 104,593
- Average attendance: 307 (-9.2% to previous season)

The Premier Division South consisted of 17 clubs from the previous season, and five new clubs:

- Blackfield & Langley, promoted from Division One South
- Hayes & Yeading United, promoted from the Isthmian League Division One South Central
- Truro City, relegated from the National League South
- Weston-super-Mare, relegated from the National League South
- Yate Town, promoted from Division One South

=== League table ===
Pos	Team	Pld	W	D	L	GF	GA	GD	Pts	Relegation
1	Truro City (C)	31	21	4	6	65	30	+35	67	
2	Chesham United	33	21	3	9	70	44	+26	66	
3	Hayes & Yeading United	32	17	6	9	65	42	+23	57	
4	Swindon Supermarine	32	17	6	9	50	41	+9	57	
5	Tiverton Town	29	16	7	6	69	41	+28	55	
6	Taunton Town	31	15	8	8	63	53	+10	53	
7	Salisbury	30	14	9	7	57	42	+15	51	
8	Gosport Borough	33	13	10	10	35	32	+3	49	
9	Poole Town	27	14	6	7	46	28	+18	48	
10	Weston-super-Mare	29	13	6	10	54	45	+9	45	
11	Metropolitan Police	30	13	4	13	46	48	−2	43	
12	Farnborough	30	13	3	14	41	43	−2	42	
13	Merthyr Town	31	9	11	11	37	37	0	38	Left the league for one season (Note: Merthyr Town left the league for the next season due to COVID-19 pandemic in Wales.)
14	Hendon	31	10	8	13	47	51	−4	38	
15	Wimborne Town	33	10	7	16	39	52	−13	37	
16	Hartley Wintney	27	10	6	11	38	39	−1	36	
17	Harrow Borough	34	9	9	16	44	62	−18	36	
18	Blackfield & Langley	31	8	9	14	33	50	−17	33	Resigned to the Wessex League (Note: Blackfield & Langley resigned from the Southern League at the end of the season.)
19	Yate Town	31	8	5	18	38	56	−18	29	
20	Walton Casuals	33	7	6	20	40	71	−31	27	
21	Beaconsfield Town	32	6	7	19	29	54	−25	25	
22	Dorchester Town	32	4	6	22	36	81	−45	18	

Updated to match(es) played on 11 March 2020. Source: Southern League website, Non League Matters
Rules for classification: 1) Points; 2) Goal difference; 3) Number of goals scored; 4) Number of matches won; 5) Head-to-head results
(C) Champions

=== Results ===
Home \ Away	BEA	BLA	CHE	DOR	FAR	GOS	HAB	HAR	HAY	HEN	MER	MET	POO	SAL	SWI	TAU	TIV	TRU	WAL	WES	WIM	YAT
Beaconsfield Town	—	2–0	1–3	3–1	1–3	0–1		1–2	2–3		0–0	1–2	2–1		0–0		4–0	0–1	1–2	2–2	0–4	1–1
Blackfield & Langley	0–1	—	0–2	2–1	2–0	0–0	2–0	0–0		2–2	0–0	3–4	1–1				0–1	0–2	2–2	2–1	1–0	2–0
Chesham United	3–0	2–1	—	6–3	2–0	3–0	1–1	1–2	3–2	2–1	2–0		2–1	2–0	1–2	1–1		2–1			1–0	4–2
Dorchester Town	1–0	2–2		—			1–2	2–3	2–3	0–3	0–0	0–3	0–1	0–5	1–1	2–2	1–5	2–3	2–2	1–2	1–0	2–0
Farnborough	2–0	1–1		3–1	—	0–1	1–1		0–1	4–0	1–0		1–4	0–0	0–1	4–0	0–7	0–2	2–1		2–1	4–0
Gosport Borough	0–0		2–1	4–4		—	1–0	0–1	1–1	1–0	2–2	2–1	0–2	0–0		3–0		1–0	2–1	1–0		1–1
Harrow Borough	1–2	3–1	2–2			0–2	—	1–4	3–2		1–0	1–2	0–0	2–2	2–3	1–1	1–5	1–2	2–0	0–4	0–1	
Hartley Wintney			1–2	2–0		0–0	1–1	—	1–5				3–0		1–2		1–4		1–0		2–2	
Hayes & Yeading United	1–1	6–0		5–0	2–0	2–1	2–3		—	3–2		0–2	1–2	1–0	1–0	2–2	0–0	0–1		1–2	3–1	2–1
Hendon	2–1		3–1	1–3		2–1	0–1	2–2		—	2–1	1–1	1–3	0–3			1–2	1–4	2–0	4–0	1–1	2–1
Merthyr Town	0–0	2–0	1–3		2–0	1–0	2–2	3–2	1–2		—	1–2		1–1	3–1	4–2			0–2	1–1	3–1	2–1
Metropolitan Police	3–1	2–0	2–1		1–2	0–0	1–3	0–1		0–3	1–2	—		3–2	2–3	1–1		0–2	0–3	2–1	2–2	2–0
Poole Town	3–1				3–1		3–1				1–1		—		2–0	0–1	1–2				3–1	3–0
Salisbury			3–2	4–1		1–0	3–1	2–0		2–0	2–1	1–3	2–1	—	0–2	2–1	2–2	0–3			3–1	3–2
Swindon Supermarine		3–0	2–1	1–0	3–2	1–0		3–2	1–1	2–0	2–2		0–1	2–2	—	1–2		1–3	3–2	3–2		
Taunton Town	3–0	4–1	3–2		3–1	3–2	3–2		2–1	3–3		4–3			1–1	—	3–1	2–0		1–2	3–0	0–4
Tiverton Town	6–1			2–1		2–3		2–0	2–2		1–0	2–1	0–1	3–3	2–0	3–2	—		2–2		2–2	0–2
Truro City			0–1	3–0	2–1	1–0	4–1	2–1	3–0	2–1		4–0	3–3		1–0	1–1	3–3	—	5–1	0–2		
Walton Casuals		2–3	1–6		0–2	1–1	1–2	0–3	2–3	1–1	2–1		0–3	2–1	2–4	1–5	1–3		—	2–1	0–2	1–1
Weston-super-Mare	1–0		1–2	6–0	1–3		1–1	2–1	1–5	2–2			1–1	3–3			3–2	3–2	1–0	—	5–0	
Wimborne Town	2–0	2–0	1–2	2–1		1–2		0–0		0–2	0–0		2–1		0–2	0–3	0–3	2–2	4–1	2–1	—	2–0
Yate Town		1–4	4–1		0–1		2–1	2–1	0–2	2–2		1–0	1–1	2–4	2–0	4–1		0–3	0–2	1–2		—

Updated to match(es) played on 11 March 2020. Source: Southern Football League
Legend: Blue = home team win; Yellow = draw; Red = away team win.

=== Stadia and locations ===
Locations of the Premier Division South clubs
Greater London and environ Premier Division South clubs

Club	Location	Stadium	Capacity
Beaconsfield Town	Beaconsfield	Holloways Park	3,500
Blackfield & Langley	Blackfield	Gang Warily Recreation Centre	1,500
Chesham United	Chesham	The Meadow	5,000
Dorchester Town	Dorchester	The Avenue Stadium	5,000
Farnborough	Farnborough	Cherrywood Road	7,000
Gosport Borough	Gosport	Privett Park	4,500
Harrow Borough	Harrow	Earlsmead Stadium	3,000
Hartley Wintney	Hartley Wintney	The Memorial Playing Fields	2,000
Hayes & Yeading United	Hayes, Hillingdon	SkyEx Community Stadium	3,000
Hendon	Hendon	Silver Jubilee Park	2,000
Merthyr Town	Merthyr Tydfil	Penydarren Park	4,000
Metropolitan Police	East Molesey	Imber Court	3,000
Poole Town	Poole	The BlackGold Stadium	2,500
Salisbury	Salisbury	Raymond McEnhill Stadium	5,000
Swindon Supermarine	Swindon (South Marston)	Hunts Copse Ground	3,000
Taunton Town	Taunton	Wordsworth Drive	2,500
Tiverton Town	Tiverton	Ladysmead	3,500
Truro City	Truro	Treyew Road	3,200
Walton Casuals	Walton-on-Thames	Elmbridge Xcel Sports Hub	2,500
Weston-super-Mare	Weston-super-Mare	Woodspring Stadium	3,500
Wimborne Town	Wimborne Minster	The Cuthbury	3,000
Yate Town	Yate	Lodge Road	2,000

== Division One Central ==
Southern Football League Division One Central
- Season: 2019–20
- Champions: Berkhamsted
- Matches: 280
- Goals: 946 (3.38 per match)
- Top goalscorer: 25 goals - Lewis Toomey (Berkhamsted)
- Highest attendance: 811 Halesowen Town 4–0 Kempston Rovers
- Total attendance: 47,344
- Average attendance: 169 (-10.6% to previous season)

Division One Central consisted of 14 clubs from the previous season, and six new clubs.

- Relegated from the Premier Division Central:
  - Bedworth United
  - Halesowen Town
  - St Neots Town
- Plus:
  - Biggleswade, promoted from the Spartan South Midlands League
  - Daventry Town, promoted from the United Counties League
  - Wantage Town, promoted from the Hellenic League

=== League table ===
Pos	Team	Pld	W	D	L	GF	GA	GD	Pts
1	Berkhamsted (C)	28	20	4	4	69	24	+45	64
2	Halesowen Town	27	20	3	4	72	19	+53	63
3	Corby Town	28	18	5	5	64	26	+38	59
4	Welwyn Garden City	29	15	6	8	59	36	+23	51
5	Aylesbury United	29	13	10	6	49	30	+19	49
6	Biggleswade	27	13	5	9	44	33	+11	44
7	Barton Rovers	29	13	5	11	65	55	+10	44
8	Yaxley	29	13	5	11	55	52	+3	44
9	Bedworth United	27	13	5	9	46	43	+3	44
10	North Leigh	27	13	3	11	50	50	0	42
11	Thame United	27	12	4	11	51	35	+16	40
12	Bedford Town	29	11	7	11	49	54	−5	40
13	Daventry Town	28	12	4	12	42	48	−6	40
14	Coleshill Town	28	10	6	12	50	47	+3	36
15	AFC Dunstable	29	10	4	15	51	54	−3	34
16	Kidlington	28	9	6	13	32	48	−16	33
17	Didcot Town	27	7	4	16	20	44	−24	25
18	St Neots Town	28	6	3	19	33	59	−26	21
19	Kempston Rovers	28	5	2	21	29	68	−39	17
20	Wantage Town	28	1	1	26	16	121	−105	4

Updated to match(es) played on 11 March 2020. Source: Southern League website, Non League Matters
Rules for classification: 1) Points; 2) Goal difference; 3) Number of goals scored; 4) Number of matches won; 5) Head-to-head results
(C) Champions

=== Results ===
Home \ Away	DUN	AYU	BAR	BDT	BDW	BER	BIG	COL	COR	DAV	DID	HAL	KEM	KID	NOR	STN	THM	WAN	WGC	YAX
AFC Dunstable	—	0–0	3–2	4–1	2–3	0–1	2–0			2–2	3–4	1–4		0–3	4–3	1–0		7–0	2–0	0–3
Aylesbury United	3–1	—		2–1	3–1	0–0	2–1	2–0	0–0		0–0			3–0	2–3		0–0	2–0	0–0	1–1
Barton Rovers	0–0	2–4	—	4–2	2–2	1–1		3–0	2–1	2–1	2–0	1–3		5–1		3–0	2–1	4–1		2–3
Bedford Town	1–3	2–1	3–2	—	3–3	2–2		2–3	2–3	2–1	2–1	1–2	2–1	2–0		0–0		4–0	2–0	
Bedworth United		0–0		1–1	—	1–2	1–1	1–3	2–2	2–1		3–1	2–0	3–0	4–5	1–2	2–1	6–0		2–1
Berkhamsted				3–1	4–0	—		1–0		3–0	4–0	1–0	0–1	4–0	3–2	3–1	3–2	6–0	1–4	
Biggleswade	3–0	2–1	4–2			0–5	—	2–0	2–0		2–1	0–1		2–1	3–0	0–0		3–1	1–3	3–0
Coleshill Town	1–1	0–6	2–2			0–3		—	2–1	4–1	5–1	1–1	4–1	1–3	1–2		1–0	7–1	0–0	1–1
Corby Town	2–0	5–2	2–1		3–0	3–2	2–0	3–1	—	1–1		1–1	1–2	2–0			0–2	8–1	1–0	
Daventry Town		1–4	3–0		0–2		0–2	1–0	1–3	—	0–0	0–4	2–1		2–0	2–1	2–3	4–1	2–2	
Didcot Town	1–3	1–1	0–3		0–0	2–4	1–0		0–1	0–4	—		1–0			2–1	2–0		0–1	1–0
Halesowen Town	2–0	4–1	3–1	3–0	6–0				1–2	5–0		—	4–0	4–1		2–0	1–0		0–2	5–0
Kempston Rovers	3–2	2–4	1–4		1–2		2–4			0–2	1–0	0–5	—	1–1	2–4	0–2		4–0	0–3	0–3
Kidlington	2–1	1–1		0–1			1–1		0–0	0–1	1–0	1–1	0–0	—	3–0	1–0	3–0	3–2		3–2
North Leigh		2–1	4–2		0–2	1–2		2–2	0–3		3–0	1–2	2–1		—		3–2	2–1	1–0	1–1
St Neots Town	2–5	0–1	0–2	1–2		0–1	1–1	3–0	1–3	1–2	1–0		5–1		1–5	—		5–0		2–5
Thame United	2–1		2–2	1–2	3–0	1–2	2–1				1–0		2–1	3–0	2–2	6–0	—	9–0	2–2	
Wantage Town		0–2		1–3		0–7	1–4	0–6	0–8		1–2	0–5			1–0		1–2	—	1–5	1–1
Welwyn Garden City	3–1		4–1	1–1	4–2	1–1	1–0	0–3		2–4			4–2	4–1	0–1	7–1	1–2	2–1	—	3–2
Yaxley	3–2		4–6	0–1	3–1	1–0	2–2	3–2	0–3	1–2		1–2	3–1	4–2	3–1	3–2	1–0			—

Updated to match(es) played on 11 March 2020. Source: Southern Football League
Legend: Blue = home team win; Yellow = draw; Red = away team win.

=== Stadia and locations ===
Locations of Division One Central clubs

Club	Location	Stadium	Capacity
AFC Dunstable	Dunstable	Creasey Park	3,200
Aylesbury United	Aylesbury	The Meadow (groundshare with Chesham United)	5,000
Barton Rovers	Barton-le-Clay	Sharpenhoe Road	4,000
Bedford Town	Bedford	The Eyrie	3,000
Bedworth United	Bedworth	The Oval	3,000
Berkhamsted	Berkhamsted	Broadwater	2,500
Biggleswade	Biggleswade	Langford Road (groundshare with Biggleswade Town)	3,000
Coleshill Town	Coleshill	Pack Meadow	2,070
Corby Town	Corby	Steel Park	3,893
Daventry Town	Daventry	Communications Park	3,000
Didcot Town	Didcot	Loop Meadow	3,000
Halesowen Town	Halesowen	The Grove	3,150
Kempston Rovers	Kempston	Hillgrounds Leisure	2,000
Kidlington	Kidlington	Yarnton Road	1,500
North Leigh	North Leigh	Eynsham Hall Park Sports Ground	2,000
St Neots Town	St Neots	New Rowley Park	3,500
Thame United	Thame	Meadow View Park	2,000
Wantage Town	Wantage	Alfredian Park	1,500
Welwyn Garden City	Welwyn Garden City	Herns Way	1,000
Yaxley	Yaxley	Leading Drove	1,500

== Division One South ==
Southern Football League Division One South
- Season: 2019–20
- Champions: Thatcham Town
- Matches: 269
- Goals: 932 (3.46 per match)
- Top goalscorer: 21 goals - Ben Bament (Paulton Rovers)
- Highest attendance: 702 Melksham Town 4–1 Frome Town
- Total attendance: 49,045
- Average attendance: 182 (+6.4% to previous season)

Division One South consisted of 16 clubs from the previous season, and four new clubs:

- Basingstoke Town, relegated from the Premier Division South
- Frome Town, relegated from the Premier Division South
- Sholing, promoted from the Wessex League
- Willand Rovers, promoted from the Western League

=== League table ===
Pos	Team	Pld	W	D	L	GF	GA	GD	Pts
1	Thatcham Town (C)	27	18	4	5	66	28	+38	58
2	Frome Town	28	17	7	4	57	27	+30	58
3	Larkhall Athletic	27	14	7	6	45	37	+8	49
4	Winchester City	27	14	6	7	53	37	+16	48
5	Melksham Town	28	14	5	9	58	51	+7	47
6	Cirencester Town	27	14	3	10	58	38	+20	45
7	Paulton Rovers	27	13	6	8	61	43	+18	45
8	Cinderford Town	26	13	4	9	59	45	+14	43
9	Evesham United	28	11	8	9	52	50	+2	41
10	Sholing	25	12	2	11	39	33	+6	38
11	Bideford	28	10	7	11	49	50	−1	37
12	Slimbridge	26	11	2	13	54	53	+1	35
13	Highworth Town	28	8	8	12	36	41	−5	32
14	Willand Rovers	24	10	2	12	32	37	−5	32
15	Bristol Manor Farm	27	8	6	13	31	44	−13	30
16	AFC Totton	27	7	8	12	39	53	−14	29
17	Mangotsfield United	29	8	4	17	46	65	−19	28
18	Moneyfields	25	7	6	12	37	50	−13	27
19	Basingstoke Town	27	5	4	18	34	76	−42	18 (Note: Basingstoke Town were deducted one point for fielding an ineligible player in their draw with AFC Totton on 21 September 2019.)
20	Barnstaple Town	27	5	1	21	26	74	−48	16

Updated to match(es) played on 7 March 2020. Source: Southern League website, Non League Matters
Rules for classification: 1) Points; 2) Goal difference; 3) Number of goals scored; 4) Number of matches won; 5) Head-to-head results
(C) Champions

=== Results ===
Home \ Away	TOT	BAR	BAS	BID	BMF	CIN	CIR	EVE	FRO	HWT	LAR	MAN	MEL	MON	PAU	SHO	SLI	THT	WIL	WIN
AFC Totton	—		0–0	2–2	1–0	3–4		3–1	2–3	2–2	1–3			1–4	1–1			0–6	1–0	0–0
Barnstaple Town	1–0	—	0–2		1–2			0–2	0–2		3–1	3–1	1–3	0–3	0–6	0–0	0–3			1–6
Basingstoke Town	0–2	3–4	—	3–2	1–3	1–2				3–2	1–2	2–1	4–2		0–1	1–6			1–1	1–1
Bideford	2–1	3–2		—	0–2		3–0	2–2	2–1	0–0		3–0	1–3	1–0	1–3		4–1	1–1	2–1	
Bristol Manor Farm	2–3	1–2		2–1	—			0–3		0–0	0–0	0–1	0–1	1–0			2–2	0–3	2–1	3–3
Cinderford Town	4–2	2–0	3–2	1–2	5–1	—	3–1	4–3	1–4	1–2		3–1	1–1		2–0		1–2			3–1
Cirencester Town	2–1	2–1			3–0	5–3	—			0–0	4–0	5–0	5–0	4–1	2–4	2–1			6–0	3–4
Evesham United			3–1	2–2	0–0	0–4	0–0	—		2–2	1–2	4–0	1–0		1–1		4–3	2–4	1–0	2–0
Frome Town	3–0	3–1	8–0	3–0		2–1	2–1	1–1	—	1–1		2–1			2–0	1–0	1–2	3–0	1–1	2–0
Highworth Town	1–2	2–1	4–2		2–5		0–1		0–1	—	1–3		0–3	5–1		1–0	2–0	0–1		1–3
Larkhall Athletic	0–0			2–2	3–1	2–2	2–1	3–2	2–2		—	2–1	2–2	2–0	1–3			2–0	3–1	3–1
Mangotsfield United	3–3	5–1	1–1	4–2		1–3		3–5		0–0	2–0	—			3–1	3–0	3–3	0–4	2–3	1–2
Melksham Town	2–2		3–1	2–3	0–0	3–1	3–2	0–1	4–1	1–0		2–1	—	4–6	2–4	1–4	6–3	1–1		
Moneyfields	0–3	5–2		0–0		1–1	0–0	4–1	2–2	1–0		1–0		—	1–1			1–1		0–2
Paulton Rovers		4–0	4–2		4–2	3–1	0–1	5–3	2–2	3–1	2–2		1–3	3–2	—	3–4		1–2		
Sholing		3–1	2–0	3–2	1–0		3–1	1–2	0–0		1–2	2–4		2–1		—	3–1	0–2	1–0	1–2
Slimbridge	5–2	4–0	2–0	2–1			0–3	5–2	1–2	2–4	0–1	4–1	2–4		1–0		—		0–1	1–2
Thatcham Town		5–1	8–0	4–3	1–2	2–2	3–0				2–0	2–0	0–2	4–3		1–0	1–3	—	2–0	2–1
Willand Rovers		1–0	4–1	3–2		2–1			1–0	0–1	1–0	2–3		7–0		2–0		0–4	—	
Winchester City	2–1		5–1		2–0	0–3		1–1		2–2			3–0	3–1	1–1	0–1	3–2		3–0	—

Updated to match(es) played on 7 March 2020. Source: Southern Football League
Legend: Blue = home team win; Yellow = draw; Red = away team win.

=== Stadia and locations ===
Locations of Division One South clubs

Club	Location	Stadium	Capacity
AFC Totton	Totton	Testwood Stadium	3,000
Barnstaple Town	Barnstaple	Mill Road	5,000
Basingstoke Town	Basingstoke	The City Ground (groundshare with Winchester City)	4,500
Bideford	Bideford	The Sports Ground	2,000
Bristol Manor Farm	Bristol (Sea Mills)	The Creek	2,000
Cinderford Town	Cinderford	Causeway Ground	3,500
Cirencester Town	Cirencester	Corinium Stadium	4,500
Evesham United	Evesham	Jubilee Stadium	3,000
Frome Town	Frome	Badgers Hill	2,000
Highworth Town	Highworth	The Elms Recreation Ground	2,000
Larkhall Athletic	Bath (Larkhall)	The Plain Ham Ground	1,000
Mangotsfield United	Mangotsfield	Cossham Street	2,500
Melksham Town	Melksham	Oakfield Stadium	2,500
Moneyfields	Portsmouth	Moneyfields Sports Ground	2,000
Paulton Rovers	Paulton	Athletic Field	2,500
Sholing	Sholing	Universal Stadium	1,000
Slimbridge	Slimbridge	Thornhill Park	1,500
Thatcham Town	Thatcham	Waterside Park	1,500
Willand Rovers	Willand	The Stan Robinson Stadium	1,000
Winchester City	Winchester	The City Ground	4,500

== See also ==
- Southern Football League
- 2019–20 Isthmian League
- 2019–20 Northern Premier League
