= Jason Barnett =

English footballer

Personal information
- Full name: Jason Vincent Barnett
- Date of birth: 21 April 1976 (age 50)
- Place of birth: Shrewsbury, England
- Position: Defender

Senior career*
Years	Team	Apps	(Gls)
1994–1995	Wolverhampton Wanderers	0	(0)
1995–2002	Lincoln City	207	(6)
2002–200?	Lincoln United		
2004–2005	Cottesmore Amateurs		
2005–200?	Spalding United		
- * Club domestic league appearances and goals

Jason Vincent Barnett (born 21 April 1976) is an English former footballer who made 207 appearances in the Football League for Lincoln City between 1995 and 2002.

== Career ==
Barnett was born in Shrewsbury. He was a product of the youth team of Wolverhampton Wanderers, but never played for the first team. He joined Lincoln City in October 1995 for a £5,000 fee, scored on his debut, and went on to make 239 appearances for the club in all competitions, scoring in his last game for Lincoln in 2005. With the club on the verge of administration, Barnett was one of several players who left Sincil Bank as part of cost-cutting measures at the conclusion of the 2001–02 campaign.

He joined Northern Premier League club Lincoln United in July 2002, but his career was cut short by injury and he switched careers to work in the Prison Service. In late 2004, he appeared for local team Cottesmore Amateurs, and returned to semi-professional football in September 2005 with Spalding United, who at the time were managed by his former Lincoln defensive teammate Steve Welsh.
