= 2018–19 United Counties League =

The 2018–19 United Counties League season (known as the 2018–19 Future Lions United Counties League for sponsorship reasons) was the 112th in the history of the United Counties League, a football competition in England.

The provisional club allocations for steps 5 and 6 were announced by the FA on 25 May. The constitution is subject to ratification by the league at its AGM on 16 June.

== Premier Division ==
United Counties League Premier Division
- Season: 2018–19
- Champions: Daventry Town
- Promoted: Daventry Town
- Relegated: Kirby Muxloe; Wellingborough Whitworth
- Matches: 380
- Goals: 1,292 (3.4 per match)

The Premier Division featured 18 clubs which competed in the division last season, along with two new clubs:

- Pinchbeck United, promoted from Division One
- Rugby Town, transferred from the Midland League

=== League table ===
Pos	Team	Pld	W	D	L	GF	GA	GD	Pts	Promotion or relegation
1	Daventry Town	38	29	7	2	91	29	+62	94	Promoted to the Southern Football League
2	Deeping Rangers	38	28	4	6	81	45	+36	88	
3	Rugby Town	38	25	5	8	86	42	+44	80	
4	Pinchbeck United	38	20	10	8	76	46	+30	70	
5	Holbeach United	38	21	6	11	77	38	+39	69	
6	Eynesbury Rovers	38	21	5	12	82	43	+39	68	Transferred to the Spartan South Midlands League
7	Cogenhoe United	38	20	8	10	81	50	+31	68	
8	Newport Pagnell Town	38	18	7	13	77	53	+24	61	Transferred to the Spartan South Midlands League
9	Desborough Town	38	17	9	12	64	50	+14	60	
10	Oadby Town	38	18	5	15	67	61	+6	59 (Note: Oadby Town submitted their resignation from the league with nine games to play, but intend to complete the season.)	
11	Harborough Town	38	18	3	17	74	60	+14	57	
12	Leicester Nirvana	38	12	9	17	72	75	−3	45	
13	Sleaford Town	38	13	5	20	60	72	−12	44	
14	Wellingborough Town	38	11	8	19	50	75	−25	41	
15	Northampton ON Chenecks	38	12	4	22	49	75	−26	40	
16	Peterborough Northern Star	38	11	5	22	44	64	−20	38	
17	Boston Town	38	10	8	20	52	76	−24	38	
18	Rothwell Corinthians	38	6	12	20	48	79	−31	30	
19	Kirby Muxloe	38	6	1	31	35	108	−73	19	Relegated to the Midland League
20	Wellingborough Whitworth	38	2	3	33	26	151	−125	9	Relegated to Division One

Source: FA Full-time fchd
Rules for classification: 1) Points; 2) Goal difference; 3) Number of goals scored; 4) Number of matches won; 5) Head-to-head results

== Division One ==
United Counties League Division One
- Season: 2018–19
- Champions: Lutterworth Town
- Promoted: Lutterworth Town; Anstey Nomads
- Relegated: Thrapston Town
- Matches: 380
- Goals: 1,536 (4.04 per match)

Division One featured 14 clubs which competed in the division last season, along with six new clubs.

- Clubs relegated from the Premier Division:
  - Northampton Sileby Rangers
  - St Andrews
- Clubs transferred from the East Midlands Counties League:
  - Anstey Nomads
  - Aylestone Park
  - Birstall United
  - Holwell Sports

=== League table ===
Pos	Team	Pld	W	D	L	GF	GA	GD	Pts	Promotion or relegation
1	Lutterworth Town	38	30	5	3	133	30	+103	95	Promoted to the Premier Division
2	Anstey Nomads	38	30	4	4	133	34	+99	94	Promoted to the Premier Division
3	Melton Town	38	28	4	6	105	33	+72	88	
4	Bugbrooke St Michaels	38	20	12	6	86	41	+45	72	
5	Blackstones	38	20	8	10	81	59	+22	68	
6	Lutterworth Athletic	38	17	6	15	74	57	+17	57	
7	Harrowby United	38	17	5	16	81	73	+8	56	
8	Aylestone Park	38	16	7	15	85	70	+15	55	
9	Northampton Sileby Rangers	38	16	6	16	67	84	−17	54	
10	Irchester United	38	15	8	15	70	63	+7	53	
11	Rushden & Higham United	38	15	7	16	62	67	−5	52	
12	Burton Park Wanderers	38	14	5	19	66	89	−23	47	
13	Bourne Town	38	11	13	14	64	90	−26	46	
14	Holwell Sports	38	11	5	22	70	109	−39	38	
15	Long Buckby	38	9	9	20	57	92	−35	36	
16	St Andrews	38	9	8	21	74	93	−19	35	
17	Birstall United	38	11	8	19	56	93	−37	35 (Note: Birstall United were deducted six points for playing an ineligible player against Huntingdon Town on 22 September, and for team sheet irregularities.)	
18	Huntingdon Town	38	10	2	26	54	121	−67	32	
19	Raunds Town	38	9	4	25	44	117	−73	31	
20	Thrapston Town	38	5	8	25	48	95	−47	23	Relegated to the Northamptonshire Combination

Source: FA Full-time fchd
Rules for classification: 1) Points; 2) Goal difference; 3) Number of goals scored; 4) Number of matches won; 5) Head-to-head results
