= Ricky Miller =

English footballer

- Miller (wearing the number 9 shirt) is congratulated by his team-mates after scoring a goal for Dover Athletic in 2016

Personal information
- Full name: Ricky Howard Miller
- Date of birth: 13 March 1989 (age 37)
- Place of birth: Hatfield, England
- Height: 6 ft 2 in (1.88 m)
- Position: Striker

Youth career
- Charlton Athletic
- –2006: Woking

Senior career*
Years	Team	Apps	(Gls)
2006–2007	Stamford		
2006	→ Cottesmore Amateurs (loan)		
2006	→ Bourne Town (loan)		
2007	→ Rothwell Town (loan)		
2007	Corby Town		
2007	Hitchin Town		
2007–2008	Fleet Town		
2008–2009	Spalding United		
2009	Boston United	12	(6)
2009–2010	Stamford		
2010	Cambridge City	2	(0)
2010–2011	Aylesbury	34	(15)
2011	Wealdstone	3	(0)
2011	→ Hemel Hempstead Town (loan)	2	(0)
2011–2012	Stamford		
2012	Corby Town	4	(0)
2012	St Ives Town		
2012–2013	Stamford		
2012	→ Arlesey Town (loan)	4	(0)
2013–2014	Boston United	40	(24)
2014–2015	Luton Town	12	(1)
2014	→ Dover Athletic (loan)	10	(5)
2015–2017	Dover Athletic	86	(60)
2017–2018	Peterborough United	10	(0)
2018	→ Mansfield Town (loan)	8	(1)
2018–2019	Port Vale	28	(4)
2021	Aldershot Town	22	(4)
2021	Dover Athletic	10	(0)
2021–2023	Grantham Town	23	(10)
2023	Risborough Rangers	15	(12)
2023	Stamford	7	(2)
Total		342	(149)
- * Club domestic league appearances and goals

Ricky Howard Miller (born 13 March 1989) is an English former professional footballer who played as a striker.

Miller spent time in the youth systems at Charlton Athletic and Woking before making his senior debut with Stamford in September 2006. He went on to have brief spells with Cottesmore Amateurs, Bourne Town, Rothwell Town, Corby Town, Hitchin Town, Fleet Town, Spalding United, Boston United, Cambridge City, Aylesbury, Wealdstone, Hemel Hempstead Town, St Ives Town and Arlesey Town. In his fourth spell with Stamford, at the end of the 2012–13 season, he scored the winning goal in the Northern Premier League Division One South play-off final. Miller then found success during his second spell at Boston United and was named the Conference North Player of the Year for the 2013–14 season after scoring 24 goals in 40 league matches. He signed with Luton Town in June 2014, entering the Football League at the age of 25. Miller was loaned to Dover Athletic for part of the 2014–15 season before joining the club permanently in June 2015. He scored 45 goals in 46 appearances in the 2016–17 season, a record for the National League, and was named National League Player of the Year.

Miller returned to the Football League after signing a three-year contract with Peterborough United in May 2017. He joined Mansfield Town on loan in January 2018 and was sold to Port Vale in June 2018. He left Vale 12 months into his two-year deal after his contract was terminated by mutual consent. Having spent 1 1/2 seasons out of the game, he signed with Aldershot Town in January 2021 before rejoining Dover Athletic five months later. He later played for Grantham Town and Risborough Rangers before embarking on a fifth spell with Stamford.

== Career ==
=== Early career ===
Born in Hatfield, Hertfordshire, Miller began his career with Charlton Athletic's youth academy. He later joined the Woking youth system, before signing for Stamford in September 2006. Miller made his debut on 19 September as a late substitute in the club's 2–1 home defeat to Lincoln United in an FA Cup first qualifying round replay. He joined Leicestershire Senior League Division One team Cottesmore Amateurs on dual terms, scoring twice on his debut, a 6–4 away defeat to Ashby Ivanhoe on 23 September. He then linked up with Bourne Town, again on a dual basis, making his debut on 18 October in a 4–0 home United Counties League defeat to Boston Town. Miller then agreed dual terms with Rothwell Town, spending the latter half of the season with the club and scoring his first senior hat-trick in their 3–0 Southern League Division One Midlands home victory over Bromsgrove Rovers on 6 March 2007.

Although offered terms by Stamford for the 2007–08 season, Miller instead chose to join Corby Town. He signed for Cambridge City in January 2010, after manager Gary Roberts was impressed with his record of 14 goals for Stamford in the first half of the 2009–10 season. Gordon Bartlett signed Miller for Wealdstone in October 2011 to play alongside target man forward Richard Jolly. He won a contract with former club Corby Town in August 2012, after scoring six goals during a pre-season trial.

=== Return to Stamford and Boston United ===
Miller re-signed for Stamford for a fourth spell during the 2012–13 season and scored the winning goal in the play-off final against Chasetown to help the club win promotion to the Northern Premier League Premier Division. He then re-signed for Conference North club Boston United in June 2013, and finished 2013–14 with 46 appearances and 28 goals, as the club narrowly missed out on the play-offs with a sixth-place finish. He was named as the Conference North Player of the Year and was also named in the Team of the Year.

=== Luton Town ===
On 25 June 2014, Miller signed a one-year contract with League Two club Luton Town on a free transfer from Boston. On 2 September 2014, he joined Conference Premier team Dover Athletic on loan, before being recalled just over a month later after scoring five goals in ten appearances. Miller made his debut for Luton the following day in a 2–1 away victory over Hartlepool United. He scored his first goal for the club in a 4–2 FA Cup victory over Newport County, and this was followed up with his first Football League goal in the following match, a 1–0 win at home to Tranmere Rovers. Miller finished the 2014–15 season with 15 appearances and two goals for Luton.

=== Dover Athletic ===
On 30 June 2015, Miller joined Dover Athletic permanently on a two-year contract, following his release by Luton. His first goal for Dover came on 11 August in a 3–2 victory over Kidderminster Harriers at the Crabble Athletic Ground. In the space of a week, Miller scored in three consecutive matches in November, before scoring five goals in three matches from December to January. He scored the equaliser in a 1–1 draw away to Kidderminster Harriers on 23 April, a result that confirmed Dover's place in the play-offs. Miller played in both legs of Dover's play-off semi-final defeat to Forest Green Rovers, which finished 2–1 on aggregate, despite him scoring the opening goal in the second leg to level the tie. He finished the 2015–16 season with 22 goals in 54 appearances.

Miller made his first appearance of 2016–17 on the opening day of the season in a 0–0 away draw with Wrexham. In the following match, he scored his first goal of the season with a penalty in the first half, but was sent off four minutes into the second half, as Dover conceded four second-half goals and were beaten 4–1 by Boreham Wood. Miller returned to the team for a 4–2 away victory over Eastleigh on 16 August, in which he scored Dover's fourth goal, having entered the match as a 78th-minute substitute. He scored a hat-trick for Dover in a 4–3 home win over Forest Green Rovers on 10 September, before scoring ten goals in five matches in October, including four goals in a 6–1 victory at home to Braintree Town. This was followed by ten goals in seven matches from November to December, which included a hat-trick in a 3–2 win away to Solihull Moors. Miller scored two further hat-tricks in wins over Eastleigh and Barrow, and was named as the National League Player of the Year for 2016–17, in which he scored 45 goals from 46 appearances. Upon receiving the award, Miller said "I was hung out to dry by Luton and I lost my home and relationship – I was ready to quit football. I'm so grateful to the gaffer, Jake, Jim and my team-mates for showing faith in me". Despite his exploits, Dover narrowly missed out on a play-off place. After the end of the season, he was named as Dover's Player of the Season.

=== Peterborough United ===
On 3 May 2017, Miller signed for League One club Peterborough United on a three-year contract. A week after signing, chairman Darragh MacAnthony said the club had received a £250,000 bid for the player before his contract had even officially began. Director of football Barry Fry said he had inquired after Miller in January, but his phone calls were ignored by Dover. However, shortly before his contract was due to begin, Miller was handed a six-match ban by The Football Association for a 'biting incident' relating to his time at Dover Athletic. Miller issued a statement to provide some context for the ban via the Peterborough United website, stating he was being "held in a headlock" and resorted to biting as he was "unable to breathe". He was transfer-listed after failing to score in his first 13 matches, and MacAnthony said Miller was "driving me mad" after turning down moves to five different clubs in favour of a move to a club closer to his home that did not meet Peterborough's valuation. On 31 January 2018, he joined League Two club Mansfield Town on loan until the end of 2017–18 season. He scored one goal from eight substitute appearances, as Mansfield finished in eighth place in the table. Upon his return to London Road, Miller was transfer-listed by new manager Steve Evans, who had signed him on loan at Mansfield earlier in the year.

=== Port Vale ===
On 22 June 2018, Miller signed for League Two club Port Vale on a two-year contract for an undisclosed fee. Manager Neil Aspin had previously tried to sign him at FC Halifax Town and Gateshead. He was unable to play in the club's 2018–19 pre-season friendlies because of an unresolved disciplinary issue with The Football Association. He scored a goal and won a penalty on his debut on the opening day of the new season on 4 August, helping the "Valiants" to record a 3–0 victory over Cambridge United at Vale Park. However, he was dropped after failing to score in the rest of the month, though impressed coach Lee Nogan with his performances off the bench, who said Miller just needed to rebuild his confidence following the goal drought. Aspin then switched to a 3–4–3 / 5–4–1 formation, leaving Miller to compete with Ben Whitfield for a place at wide midfield. Miller fell out of first-team contention by November, leaving Aspin to comment that "you have to be perfectly honest, he has not done the job at the moment that I brought him to do and, like I say, he has to do better."

He was recalled to the first-team on 19 January, following an injury to Tom Pope, and scored his second league goal for the club to secure a 1–0 win at Crawley Town. However, he was shown a straight red card in a 1–0 home defeat to Carlisle United seven days later. An injury to Pope saw new manager John Askey return Miller to the starting eleven on 9 March, and he doubled his league tally for the season with both Vale goals in a 2–1 win over promotion-chasing Mansfield Town; his performance saw him named on the EFL team of the week.

He ended the campaign with six goals in 22 starts and 13 substitute appearances. His contract was terminated by mutual consent on 27 June, and the club refused to comment on the reasons behind his departure. Miller wrote on Twitter that he was "Sorry I didn't fulfill my potential but I've found the last two years very difficult. I hope I leave you with some good memories." He later wrote that he suffered a mental breakdown at the club, saying that he "couldn't confide in my manager or teammates my only defence mechanism was to act, touch and pretend I didn't care".

=== Later career ===
On 1 January 2021, Miller signed for National League club Aldershot Town. He stated that "I've got a point to prove" and "I feel fitter than I did at Dover and I've come a long way since then as well, so I'm hoping I can pick up where I left off". He made his debut for the club the following day, coming off of the bench to score the only goal in a 1–0 victory away at rivals Woking. He ended the 2020–21 campaign with four goals in 23 games.

On 24 June 2021, Miller returned to former club Dover Athletic, hoping to help the club avoid relegation despite starting the 2021–22 National League campaign with a 12-point deduction. Miller's first goal since his return to the club came on 16 October 2021, when he scored a 61st-minute equaliser to earn a replay against seventh tier Yate Town in the FA Cup fourth qualifying round. Miller departed the club on 3 December after his contract was terminated by mutual consent.

On 4 December 2021, Miller joined Northern Premier League Premier Division side Grantham Town, making his debut later that day as his new side drew with Mickleover Sports. Miller scored his first goal for the club in a 1–1 draw with Lancaster City on 1 February 2022. On 15 February, Miller scored all four goals, including a 93rd-minute winner, as Grantham came from 3–1 down in the 80th-minute to win 4–3 against Ashton United to secure the club's first home win in 27 matches. He ended the 2021–22 season with eight goals in 15 games, though could not prevent the "Gingerbreads" suffering relegation with a last-place finish. He scored four goals in twelve games in the first half of the 2022–23 season.

On 7 February 2023, Miller scored on his debut for Spartan South Midlands League side Risborough Rangers. He scored twelve goals in 15 games towards the end of the 2022–23 campaign, including a hat-trick in a 5–2 win at Biggleswade United. On 12 July 2023, he joined Stamford for a fifth spell. He scored two goals in eight games.

On 31 July 2024, Miller announced his retirement from football following a serious knee injury that he had sustained representing a Dover Athletic legends team.

== Style of play ==
Miller is a goal-scoring striker with a high work rate, and has been compared to Kevin Phillips by former Luton manager John Still for his ability to capitalize on chances around the box.

== Personal life ==
Miller struggled with depression and alcoholism after his brother Michael, a firefighter, was killed in the line of duty. Michael Miller died aged 26, on 2 February 2005, battling to save a woman trapped during the Harrow Court fire.

He was convicted of drunk driving in 2006 and again in 2009. On 27 April 2015, Miller and his Luton Town teammate Shaun Whalley were both arrested by Bedfordshire Police in connection with an alleged assault following the club's end of season awards night. Both were released on bail but were suspended by the club pending a police inquiry. His Luton contract was terminated following his arrest. On 3 June 2015, Miller was charged with five offences in connection to the assault. On 8 December 2015, Miller was found not guilty and cleared of the charges. On 5 November 2017, Miller was arrested and later charged with assaulting a police officer, using threatening behaviour and failing to provide a specimen. On 11 June 2018, the charge of assault was dropped, though he was handed a 42-month driving ban after pleading guilty to failing to provide a blood sample.

Miller has talked of his struggles having Attention deficit hyperactivity disorder and the impact that this has had on his football career, and the lack of support offered by his former clubs.

== Career statistics ==
Appearances and goals by club, season and competition
Club	Season	League			FA Cup		League Cup		Other		Total	
Club	Season	Division	Apps	Goals	Apps	Goals	Apps	Goals	Apps	Goals	Apps	Goals
Boston United	2008–09	Northern Premier League; Premier Division	12	6	—		—		—		12	6
Cambridge City	2009–10	Southern League; Premier Division	2	0	—		—		1 (Note: Appearance in Southern League Cup)	0	3	0
Aylesbury	2010–11	Southern League; Division One Central	29	12	0	0	—		3 (Note: Two appearances in Southern League Cup, one in Berks & Bucks Senior Cup)	0	32	12
Aylesbury	2011–12	Southern League; Division One Central	5	3	1	1	—		—		6	4
Aylesbury	Total		34	15	1	1	—		3	0	38	16
Wealdstone	2011–12	Isthmian League; Premier Division	3	0	—		—		2 (Note: One appearance in Isthmian League Cup, one in FA Trophy)	0	5	0
Hemel Hempstead Town (loan)	2011–12	Southern League; Premier Division	2	0	—		—		—		2	0
Corby Town	2012–13	Conference North	4	0	—		—		—		4	0
Arlesey Town	2012–13	Southern League; Premier Division	4	0	—		—		2 (Note: One appearance in Bedfordshire Senior Cup, one appearance and one goal in Southern League Cup)	1	6	1
Boston United	2013–14	Conference North	40	24	2	2	—		4 (Note: One appearance in Lincolnshire Senior Cup, three appearances and two goals in FA Trophy)	2	46	28
Luton Town	2014–15	League Two	12	1	3	1	0	0	0	0	15	2
Dover Athletic (loan)	2014–15	Conference Premier	10	5	—		—		—		10	5
Dover Athletic	2015–16	National League	45	20	2	0	—		7 (Note: Five appearances and one goal in FA Trophy, two appearances and one goal in National League play-offs)	2	54	22
Dover Athletic	2016–17	National League	41	40	3	4	—		2 (Note: Appearances in FA Trophy)	1	46	45
Dover Athletic	Total		96	65	5	4	—		9	3	110	72
Peterborough United	2017–18	League One	10	0	1	0	0	0	2 (Note: Appearances in EFL Trophy)	0	13	0
Mansfield Town (loan)	2017–18	League Two	8	1	—		—		—		8	1
Port Vale	2018–19	League Two	28	4	1	0	1	0	5	2	35	6
Aldershot Town	2020–21	National League	22	4	—		—		1	0	23	4
Dover Athletic	2021–22	National League	10	0	1	1	—		0	0	11	1
Grantham Town	2021–22	Northern Premier League; Premier Division	15	8	—		—		0	0	15	8
Grantham Town	2022–23	Northern Premier League; Premier Division	8	2	4	2	—		0	0	12	4
Grantham Town	Total		23	10	4	2	—		0	0	27	12
Risborough Rangers	2022–23	Spartan South Midlands; Premier Division	15	12	0	0	—		0	0	15	12
Stamford	2023–24	Southern League; Premier Division Central	7	2	1	0	—		0	0	8	2
Career total			342	149	19	11	1	0	29	8	391	168

== Honours ==
Stamford

- Northern Premier League Division One South play-offs: 2012–13

Individual

- Conference North Player of the Year: 2013–14
- Conference North Team of the Year: 2013–14
- National League Player of the Year: 2016–17
- National League Team of the Year: 2016–17
- Dover Athletic Player of the Season: 2016–17
