= 2019–20 United Counties League =

The 2019–20 season was the 113th in the history of the United Counties League, a football competition in England.

The allocations for Steps 1 to 6 for season 2019–20 were announced by the FA on 19 May 2019. These are subject to appeal, and the United Counties' constitution is subject to ratification at the league's AGM on 22 June 2019.

As a result of the COVID-19 pandemic, this season's competition was formally abandoned on 26 March 2020, with all results from the season being expunged, and no promotion or relegation taking place to, from, or within the competition. On 30 March 2020, sixty-six non-league clubs sent an open letter to the Football Association requesting that they reconsider their decision.

== Premier Division ==
United Counties League Premier Division
- Season: 2019–20
- Matches: 272
- Goals: 1,010 (3.71 per match)

The Premier Division featured 15 clubs which competed in the division last season, along with five new clubs.

- Clubs, promoted from Division One:
  - Anstey Nomads
  - Lutterworth Town
- Clubs, transferred from the Midland League:
  - Loughborough University
  - Quorn
  - Shepshed Dynamo

=== League table ===
| Pos | Team | Pld | W | D | L | GF | GA | GD | Pts |
|---|---|---|---|---|---|---|---|---|---|
| 1 | Quorn | 30 | 19 | 7 | 4 | 92 | 35 | +57 | 64 |
| 2 | Shepshed Dynamo | 25 | 19 | 3 | 3 | 65 | 15 | +50 | 60 |
| 3 | Rugby Town | 27 | 18 | 3 | 6 | 77 | 27 | +50 | 57 |
| 4 | Loughborough University | 27 | 17 | 5 | 5 | 66 | 22 | +44 | 56 |
| 5 | Holbeach United | 27 | 16 | 6 | 5 | 70 | 29 | +41 | 54 |
| 6 | Deeping Rangers | 27 | 14 | 7 | 6 | 74 | 47 | +27 | 49 |
| 7 | Anstey Nomads | 29 | 13 | 8 | 8 | 67 | 56 | +11 | 47 |
| 8 | Rothwell Corinthians | 24 | 12 | 5 | 7 | 44 | 28 | +16 | 41 |
| 9 | Harborough Town | 29 | 11 | 6 | 12 | 52 | 56 | −4 | 39 |
| 10 | Leicester Nirvana | 24 | 10 | 7 | 7 | 45 | 44 | +1 | 37 |
| 11 | Boston Town | 28 | 10 | 7 | 11 | 48 | 50 | −2 | 37 |
| 12 | Wellingborough Town | 27 | 10 | 7 | 10 | 48 | 52 | −4 | 37 |
| 13 | Lutterworth Town | 27 | 9 | 5 | 13 | 54 | 61 | −7 | 32 |
| 14 | Peterborough Northern Star | 28 | 9 | 4 | 15 | 43 | 58 | −15 | 31 |
| 15 | Oadby Town | 26 | 7 | 8 | 11 | 27 | 40 | −13 | 29 |
| 16 | Northampton ON Chenecks | 28 | 6 | 9 | 13 | 33 | 57 | −24 | 27 |
| 17 | Cogenhoe United | 27 | 7 | 5 | 15 | 37 | 68 | −31 | 26 |
| 18 | Desborough Town | 29 | 6 | 3 | 20 | 28 | 75 | −47 | 21 |
| 19 | Sleaford Town | 28 | 3 | 2 | 23 | 21 | 120 | −99 | 11 |
| 20 | Pinchbeck United | 27 | 1 | 3 | 23 | 19 | 70 | −51 | 6 |

Updated to match(es) played on 14 March 2020. Source: FA Full-time
Rules for classification: 1) Points; 2) Goal difference; 3) Number of goals scored; 4) Number of matches won; 5) Head-to-head results

== Division One ==
United Counties League Division One
- Season: 2019–20
- Matches: 283
- Goals: 1,088 (3.84 per match)

Division One featured 17 clubs which competed in the division last season, along with three new clubs:

- Saffron Dynamo, promoted from the Leicestershire Senior League
- Wellingborough Whitworth, relegated from the Premier Division
- Whittlesey Athletic, promoted from the Peterborough & District League

=== League table ===
| Pos | Team | Pld | W | D | L | GF | GA | GD | Pts |
|---|---|---|---|---|---|---|---|---|---|
| 1 | Bugbrooke St Michaels | 29 | 22 | 6 | 1 | 65 | 23 | +42 | 72 |
| 2 | Long Buckby | 29 | 21 | 4 | 4 | 87 | 37 | +50 | 67 |
| 3 | Melton Town | 26 | 19 | 5 | 2 | 74 | 20 | +54 | 62 |
| 4 | Aylestone Park | 30 | 18 | 7 | 5 | 82 | 37 | +45 | 61 |
| 5 | Harrowby United | 30 | 15 | 7 | 8 | 60 | 38 | +22 | 52 |
| 6 | St Andrews | 29 | 15 | 3 | 11 | 50 | 51 | −1 | 48 |
| 7 | Blackstones | 29 | 14 | 4 | 11 | 78 | 52 | +26 | 46 |
| 8 | Irchester United | 27 | 13 | 5 | 9 | 59 | 43 | +16 | 44 |
| 9 | Burton Park Wanderers | 27 | 13 | 4 | 10 | 40 | 32 | +8 | 43 |
| 10 | Holwell Sports | 27 | 12 | 5 | 10 | 67 | 57 | +10 | 41 |
| 11 | Wellingborough Whitworth | 29 | 12 | 5 | 12 | 64 | 79 | −15 | 41 |
| 12 | Saffron Dynamo | 22 | 11 | 2 | 9 | 48 | 35 | +13 | 35 |
| 13 | Whittlesey Athletic | 29 | 8 | 9 | 12 | 44 | 69 | −25 | 33 |
| 14 | Raunds Town | 28 | 9 | 5 | 14 | 46 | 58 | −12 | 32 |
| 15 | Birstall United | 30 | 9 | 3 | 18 | 50 | 62 | −12 | 30 |
| 16 | Rushden & Higham United | 29 | 8 | 4 | 17 | 44 | 74 | −30 | 28 |
| 17 | Northampton Sileby Rangers | 28 | 7 | 3 | 18 | 38 | 68 | −30 | 24 |
| 18 | Bourne Town | 29 | 6 | 3 | 20 | 30 | 69 | −39 | 21 |
| 19 | Huntingdon Town | 30 | 4 | 7 | 19 | 40 | 81 | −41 | 19 |
| 20 | Lutterworth Athletic | 29 | 1 | 1 | 27 | 22 | 103 | −81 | 4 |

Updated to match(es) played on 14 March 2020. Source: FA Full-time
Rules for classification: 1) Points; 2) Goal difference; 3) Number of goals scored; 4) Number of matches won; 5) Head-to-head results
