= Glenfield United F.C. =

Association football club in England

Coordinates: 52.590786°N 1.13339°W

Glenfield United
- Full name: Glenfield United Football Club
- Ground: Saffron Lane, Wigston
- Capacity: 1,128
- League: Leicestershire Senior League Premier Division
- 2021–22: Leicestershire Senior League Premier Division,
Home colours

Glenfield United Football Club is a football club based in Wigston, Leicestershire, England. They are currently members of the Leicestershire Senior League Premier Division and play at Saffron Lane, groundsharing with Aylestone Park.

== History ==
The club joined the Leicestershire Senior League Championship in the 2016–17 season as County Hall F.C., finishing fifth. In 2018–19, County Hall finished third in the renamed Division One, gaining promotion to the Premier Division. County Hall entered the FA Vase for the first time in 2019–20. The club changed to its present name in 2021.

== Ground ==
The club currently play at Saffron Lane in Wigston, groundsharing with Aylestone Park. The club previously played in Glenfield, playing adjacent to Leicestershire County Council's County Hall, from which the club's name derives from.

== Records ==
- Best FA Vase performance: First qualifying round, 2019–20
