= Dorchester Sports F.C. =

Association football club in England

Coordinates: 50°42′02″N 02°26′44″W

Dorchester Sports
- Full name: Dorchester Sports Football Club
- Founded: 2007; 19 years ago
- Ground: The Avenue Stadium, Dorchester
- Capacity: 5,229 (710 seated)
- Chairman: Stephen James
- Manager: Ashley James
- League: Dorset Premier League
- 2024–25: Dorset Premier League, 3rd of 16
Home colours	Away colours

Dorchester Sports Football Club is a football club based in Dorchester, Dorset, England. They are currently members of the Dorset Premier League and play at The Avenue Stadium, groundsharing with Dorchester Town.

== History ==
Ahead of the 2016–17 season, Dorchester Sports were admitted into the Dorset Premier League, following a stint in the Dorset League. Dorchester Sports entered the FA Vase for the first time in 2019–20.

== Ground ==
The club currently groundshare with Dorchester Town at The Avenue Stadium.

== Records ==
- Best FA Vase performance: Second qualifying round, 2019–20
