= The Avenue Stadium =

Football stadium in Dorchester, England

- The Avenue
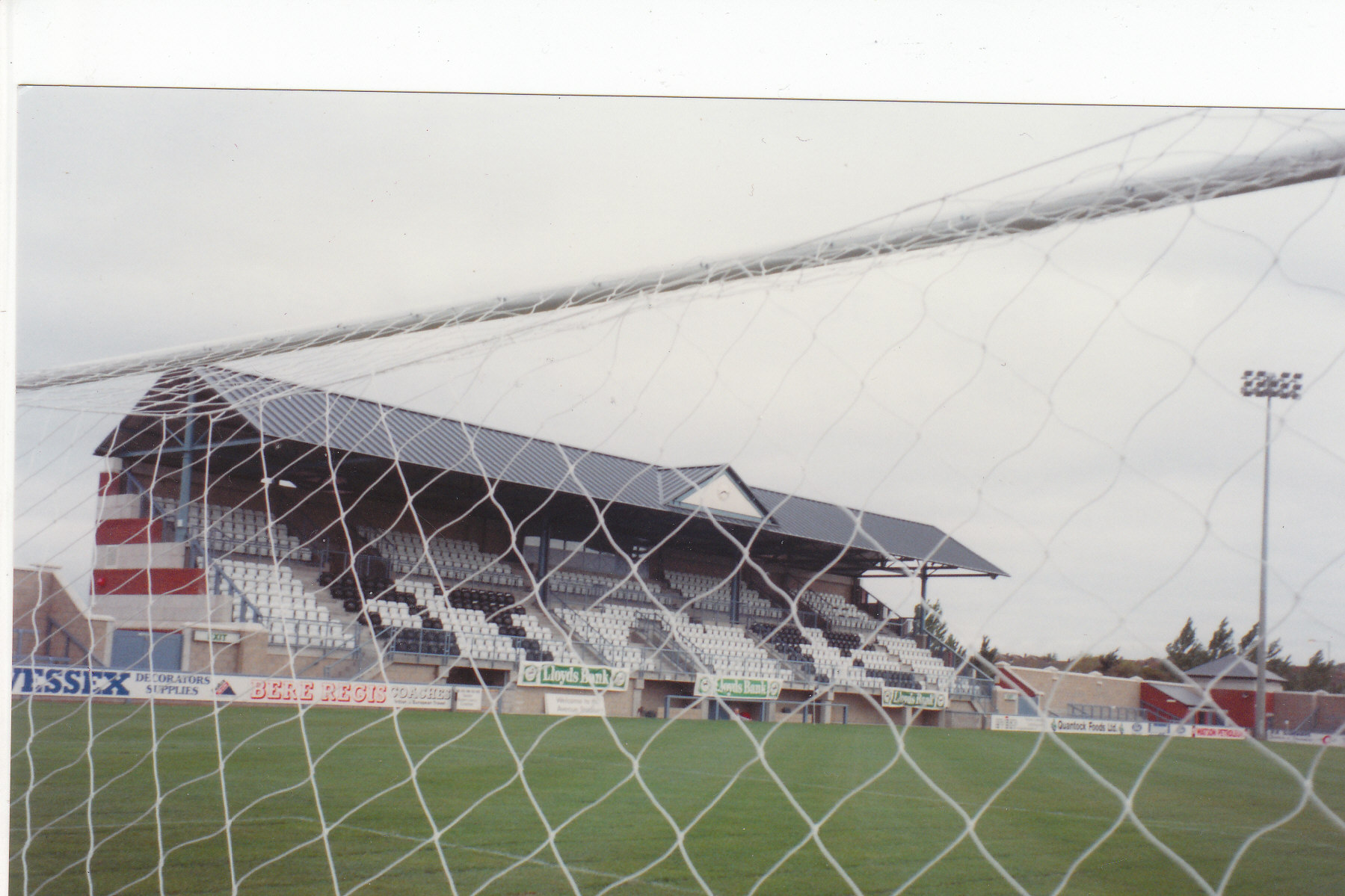
- Interactive map of The Avenue Stadium
- Location: Dorchester, England
- Coordinates: 50°42′02″N 2°26′44″W
- Owner: Dorchester Town
- Capacity: 5,009 (710 seated)
- Surface: 3G Rubber Crumb
- Record attendance: 4,129
- Field size: 118 x 78 yards (108m x 71m)

Construction
- Built: 1990
- Opened: 1990
- Cost: £3,000,000
- Main contractor: McIntyre Construction

Tenants
- Dorchester Town; Dorchester Sports; Jurassic Coast Raptors

The Avenue Stadium is a football stadium in Dorchester, England and is home of Dorchester Town F.C.

== History ==
Located to the south of Dorchester on Weymouth Avenue (where the club have been based since their inception), the ground was opened in 1990, having cost £3,000,000 to build. The stadium was designed and is owned by the Duchy of Cornwall. As such the Duke of Cornwall paid two official visits to the ground, plus a number of unofficial ones prior to the inaugural match on 18 August 1990. The whole ground was built by McIntyre Construction at a cost of around £3 million, of which £110,000 was spent on the playing surface. 32,000 tons of chalk were laid to ensure the good drainage of a pitch that was prepared fully 18 months before completion of the stadium. The chalk lies 1 metre deep at one end, and 3 metres deep at the other, to ensure a level surface.

The stadium consists of one all-seated main stand, built to reflect the architecture of traditional English stadia, and three small banks of terracing, surrounding the pitch. The record league attendance at the stadium is 4,129, set on 1 January 1999 during a league match against local rivals Weymouth.

AFC Bournemouth played some matches at the ground at the start of the 2001–02 season whilst Dean Court was undergoing rebuilding, as did Yeovil Town when Huish Park was being redeveloped.
