= Lutterworth Town A.F.C. =

Association football club in England

Coordinates: 52°27′55″N 1°12′11″W

Lutterworth Town
- Full name: Lutterworth Town Association Football Club
- Nickname: The Swifts
- Ground: Dunley Way, Lutterworth
- Chairman: Andy Dixon
- Manager: Matt Langham & Callum Earls
- League: United Counties League Premier Division South
- 2024–25: United Counties League Premier Division South, 15th of 19

Lutterworth Town Association Football Club is a football club based in Lutterworth, Leicestershire, England. They are currently members of the United Counties League Premier Division South and play at Dunley Way.

== History ==
The club were playing in the Lutterworth & District League at the start of the 1920s. They had joined the Leicester & District League by 1923, winning the Division Two title in 1923–24. After World War II the club joined the Rugby Junior League and were champions in 1948–49. They joined the Leicester City League, winning Division Two in 1950–51.

Lutterworth joined Division Two of the Leicestershire Senior League in 1955. In 1966–67 they finished second and were promoted to Division One. The club was relegated to Division Two at the end of the 1971–72 season, but were immediately promoted back to Division One as Division Two runners-up. However, the club continued to yo-yo, being relegated in 1974–75, promoted in 1977–78, relegated in 1979–80, promoted in 1980–81 (as Division Two champions), relegated in 1982–83 (at which point Division Two was renamed Division One) and promoted back to the renamed Premier Division in 1985–86.

The 1989–90 season saw Lutterworth win the Leicestershire and Rutland Senior Cup. They won the Premier Division title the following season. However, the club were relegated again at the end of the 1994–95 season. Despite only finishing eleventh in 1996–97 they were promoted to the Premier Division. They returned to Division One after finishing bottom of the Premier Division in 1999–2000. In 2015–16 the club finished third in Division One and were promoted to the Premier Division. They went on to win the Premier Division title the following season and were promoted to Division One of the United Counties League.

In 2018–19 Lutterworth won Division One of the United Counties League, earning promotion to the Premier Division. When the division was split in 2021 they were placed in the Premier Division South.

== Ground ==
The club played at Hall Park until being displaced by Lutterworth Athletic in 2011. They then played at Coventry Road during the 2011–12 season before moving to Athletic's former ground at Dunley Way, which is owned by Harborough District Council. In 2017 the club gained permission to erect floodlights and build a 50-seat stand, allowing them to move up to the United Counties League. The floodlights were installed during the summer of 2017. A new 50-seat stand was opened by Paul Gascoigne in August 2017.

== Honours ==
- United Counties League
  - Division One champions 2018–19
- Leicestershire Senior League
  - Premier Division Champions 1990–91, 2016–17
  - Division Two champions 1980–81
- Leicester & District League
  - Division Two champions 1923–24
- Leicester City League
  - Division Two champions 1950–51
- Rugby Junior League
  - Champions 1948–49
- Leicestershire and Rutland Senior Cup
  - Winners 1989–90
- Leicestershire Intermediate County Cup
  - Winners 2015–16
- Leicestershire Junior Cup South
  - Winners 1951–52

== Records ==
- Best FA Cup performance: First qualifying round, 2019–20
- Best FA Vase performance: Fourth round, 2019–20
