= Cottesmore Amateurs F.C. =

Association football club in England

Coordinates: 52°42′34.1″N 0°40′04.7″W

Cottesmore AFC
- Full name: Cottesmore AFC
- Founded: 1941
- Ground: Westray Park, Cottesmore
- Chairman: Steve Duffy
- Manager: Rich Giblin & Alex Brown
- League: Leicestershire Senior League Premier Division
- 2025–26: Leicestershire Senior League Premier Division, 7th of 16
Home colours	Away colours

Cottesmore AFC (formerly known as Cottesmore Amateurs FC) is a football club based in Cottesmore, Rutland, England. They are currently members of the Leicestershire Senior League Premier Division and play at Westray Park.

== History ==
The club was formed in 1941 and spent the first 42 years playing in local leagues. This was followed by a move slightly further afield with a 7-year stint in the Leicester and District League and, upon winning that League's Premier Division title in the 1992/3 season, a move up in standard to the Leicestershire Senior League. Following one season in Division One of the Senior League, promotion to the top division was achieved.

The club dropped into Division One in the 2001–02 season but went back into the Premier Division in the 2008–2009 season where they have remained ever since. Cottesmore became the first team outside of Lincolnshire to win the Ancaster Cup in its 113-year history during the 2012–13 season and won it for a second in the 2014–15 season. Prior to the 2017–18 season the club renamed their ground ‘Westray Park’ in recognition of exiting chairman Allan Westray's 61 years of dedicated service to the club.

Cottesmore entered the FA Vase for the first time in 2019–20 eventually reaching the first round proper. They beat higher-league opposition in their first two games with a 3–1 victory away against East Midlands Counties League side Radford FC and a 2–1 away victory against Harrowby United of the United Counties League. Cottesmore was then defeated 3–1 away against Clay Cross Town of the Central Midlands Football League.

In March of that season, the team were in 2nd place in the table with 49 points from 20 games and had applied for Step 6 promotion when the season was declared null & void due to the COVID-19 pandemic.

On 5th September 2020, Cottesmore won the Beacon Hill League Cup with a victory on penalties against Hathern FC following a 2–2 draw. The final was held over from the 2019–20 season which was ended prematurely due to COVID-19 and was played at Barrow Town's Riverside ground.

On 18th July 2023, Cottesmore won the Rutland Cup with a 7-0 victory over Stamford Lions. Cottesmore are still holders of the trophy.

On the 12th May 2026, Cottesmore won the Tiger League Cup with a 3-2 victory against Lutterworth Athletic Reserves. The game went to extra time and was won in the 116th minute of the game by Charlie Lovelace with an excellent volley from 20 yards returning the trophy to Westray Park after 6 years.

== Ground ==
The club currently play at Westray Park in Cottesmore. In 1996, the UEFA Euro 1996 championships were held in England and Cottesmore's then ‘Rogues Park’ was chosen as the Croatia national football team’s training ground due to its locality to Nottingham Forest, where their qualification games were being played. The Cottesmore pitch is, to this day, still the same size as that of the City Ground. In February 2018, Cottesmore received £2,000 from a scheme by Tesco after repeated vandalism at the site. In early 2020, the club secured more funding and, assisted by local business, have built a perimeter fence around the site to protect from further vandalism, as well as meeting criteria to be elevated to the next stage.

== Records ==
- Best FA Vase performance: First round proper, 2019/20
- Ancaster Cup winners 2018/19
- Beacon League Cup winners 2020/21
- Rutland Cup Winners 2023
- Tiger League Cup winners 2025/26
