= Francis Hillier Premier Cup =

- Organiser(s): Somerset FA
- Founded: 1928; 98 years ago, as Somerset Professional Cup; Somerset Premier Cup (1975-2025); Francis Hillier Premier Cup (since 2025)
- Region: Somerset
- Teams: 25 (2026–27)
- Current champions: Frome Town (5th title)
- Most championships: Yeovil Town; Bath City (25 titles)
- Website: Somerset FA

The Francis Hillier Premier Cup is an association football knock-out cup competition run by the Somerset County Football Association (SFA).

According to the current rules of the competition, to enter clubs first affiliation must be with the Somerset County FA, have the use of floodlights and be of a minimum of Western League standard (Level 10 of the English football league system).

The competition was first held during the 1928–29 season known as the Somerset Professional Cup, replacing the Somerset Senior Cup as the most prestigious County cup in Somerset. The first competition featured the three professional sides in the county at the time, Bath City, Taunton Town and Yeovil & Petters United, with the format initially being a round-robin tournament. Since 1934, the tournament has been a knock-out competition, while the format of the final has varied over the years, between being a two legged affair or a single match.

As of 15 July 2025, the cup was renamed from the Somerset Premier Cup in honour of Francis Hillier, former Somerset FA President.

The first winner of the tournament was Bath City. The most recent winners are Frome Town who defeated Portishead Town 3–2 in the 2026 final.

== Current participants (2026–27) ==
Team	Stadium	League
Bath City	Twerton Park	Southern League Premier Division South
Bishops Lydeard	Darby Way	South West Peninsula League Premier East
Bridgwater United	Fairfax Park	Western League Premier Division
Brislington	Brislington Stadium	Western League Premier Division
Clevedon Town	Hand Stadium	Western League Premier Division
Frome Town	Badgers Hill	Southern League Premier Division South
Ilminster Town	The Recreation Ground	South West Peninsula League Premier East
Keynsham Town	Crown Field	Western League Division One
Larkhall Athletic	Plain Ham	Southern League Division One South
Mendip Broadwalk	Filwood Fields	Western League Division One
Middlezoy Rovers	The Aerodrome	South West Peninsula League Premier East
Nailsea United	The Grove Sports Centre	Western League Division One
Odd Down	Lew Hill Memorial Ground	Western League Division One
Paulton Rovers	Winterfield Road	Southern League Division One South
Portishead Town	Bristol Road	Western League Premier Division
Radstock Town	Southfields Recreation Ground	Western League Division One
Shepton Mallet	The Playing Fields	Western League Premier Division
Street	The Tannery	Western League Premier Division
Taunton Town	Wordsworth Drive	Southern League Premier Division South
Wellington	The Playing Field	Western League Premier Division
Wells City	The Athletic Ground	Western League Premier Division
Welton Rovers	West Clewes	Western League Division One
Weston-super-Mare	Woodspring Stadium	National League South
Wincanton Town	Wincanton Sports Ground	Western League Division One
Yeovil Town	Huish Park	National League

== Finals ==
=== Results ===
Francis Hillier Premier Cup finals
Season	Winner	Score	Runner-up	Venue	Attendance
1928–29	Bath City	(Note: Competition decided by round-robin tournament between the three professional teams of Somerset at the time, Bath City, Taunton Town and Yeovil & Petters United)	Yeovil & Petters United	N/A	
1929–30	Yeovil & Petters United		Bath City	N/A	
1930–31	Yeovil & Petters United	4–3	Taunton Town	Huish Athletic Ground, Yeovil	
1931–32	Bath City		Yeovil & Petters United	N/A	
1932–33	Yeovil & Petters United		Bath City	N/A	
1933–34	Bath City		Taunton Town	N/A	
1934–35	Yeovil & Petters United	2–1	Bath City	Twerton Park, Bath	
1935–36	Bath City	0–0	Street		
1935–36	Bath City	3–1 (R)	Street		
1936–37	Glastonbury	4–1	Yeovil & Petters United		
1937–38	Yeovil & Petters United	2–1	Bath City	Street	
1938–39	Yeovil & Petters United	2–0	Bath City	Wells	
1945–46	Bath City	1–2	Yeovil & Petters United	Huish Athletic Ground, Yeovil	
1945–46	Bath City	4–2	Yeovil & Petters United	Twerton Park, Bath	
1945–46	Bath City won 5–4 on aggregate.				
1946–47	Bath City	1–1 (Note: Trophy shared between Bath City and Yeovil Town after a 1–1 draw.)	N/A	Street	
1946–47	Yeovil Town	1–1	N/A	Street	
1947–48	Yeovil Town	5–2	Ilminster Town	Ilminster	
1948–49	Glastonbury	2–1	Bath City	Glastonbury	
1949–50	Yeovil Town	6–1	Glastonbury	Glastonbury	
1950–51	Yeovil Town	5–1	Bridgwater Town	Huish Athletic Ground, Yeovil	
1951–52	Bath City	3–0	Glastonbury	Glastonbury	
1952–53	Bath City	1–1	Street	Twerton Park, Bath	
1952–53	Bath City	2–0 (R)	Street	Twerton Park, Bath	
1953–54	Yeovil Town	2–0	Bath City	Huish Athletic Ground, Yeovil	
1954–55	Yeovil Town	2–1	Minehead	Huish Athletic Ground, Yeovil	
1955–56	Yeovil Town	4–3	Bristol City	Huish Athletic Ground, Yeovil	
1956–57	Bristol City	1–1 (Note: Trophy shared between Bristol City and Yeovil Town after a 1–1 draw.)	N/A	Huish Athletic Ground, Yeovil	
1956–57	Yeovil Town	1–1	N/A	Huish Athletic Ground, Yeovil	
1957–58	Bath City	2–1	Minehead	Minehead	
1958–59	Bridgwater Town	1–1	Yeovil Town	Castle Field, Bridgwater	
1958–59	Bridgwater Town	2–1 (R)	Yeovil Town	Huish Athletic Ground, Yeovil	
1959–60	Bath City	3–0	Minehead	Twerton Park, Bath	
1960–61	Minehead	5–2	Yeovil Town	Minehead	
1960–61	Minehead	2–1	Yeovil Town	Huish Athletic Ground, Yeovil	
1960–61	Minehead won 7–3 on aggregate.				
1961–62	Yeovil Town	1–2	Bristol City	Ashton Gate Stadium, Bristol	
1961–62	Yeovil Town	3–0	Bristol City	Huish Athletic Ground, Yeovil	
1961–62	Yeovil Town won 4–2 on aggregate.				
1962–63	Yeovil Town	1–1	Bristol City	Ashton Gate Stadium, Bristol	
1962–63	Yeovil Town	2–0	Bristol City	Huish Athletic Ground, Yeovil	
1962–63	Yeovil Town won 3–1 on aggregate.				
1963–64	Bristol City	1–1	Yeovil Town	Ashton Gate Stadium, Bristol	
1963–64	Bristol City	3–1	Yeovil Town	Huish Athletic Ground, Yeovil	
1963–64	Bristol City won 4–2 on aggregate.				
1964–65	Yeovil Town	1–3	Minehead	Minehead	
1964–65	Yeovil Town	3–0	Minehead	Huish Athletic Ground, Yeovil	
1964–65	Yeovil Town won 4–3 on aggregate.				
1965–66	Bath City	2–1	Welton Rovers	Twerton Park, Bath	
1965–66	Bath City	1–1	Welton Rovers	West Clewes, Midsomer Norton	
1965–66	Bath City won 3–2 on aggregate.				
1966–67	Frome Town	2–1	Yeovil Town	Badgers Hill, Frome	
1966–67	Frome Town	1–1	Yeovil Town	Huish Athletic Ground, Yeovil	
1966–67	Frome Town won 3–2 on aggregate.				
1967–68	Bath City	3–0	Yeovil Town	Twerton Park, Bath	
1967–68	Bath City	1–0	Yeovil Town	Huish Athletic Ground, Yeovil	
1967–68	Bath City won 4–0 on aggregate.				
1968–69	Yeovil Town	3–1	Frome Town	Huish Athletic Ground, Yeovil	
1968–69	Frome Town	2–0	Yeovil Town	Badgers Hill, Frome	
1968–69	Trophy shared between Frome Town and Yeovil Town after 3–3 draw on aggregate.				
1969–70	Bath City	1–0	Bristol City	Ashton Gate Stadium, Bristol	
1969–70	Bath City	0–0	Bristol City	Twerton Park, Bath	
1969–70	Bath City won 1–0 on aggregate.				
1970–71	Bristol City	1–2	Yeovil Town	Huish Athletic Ground, Yeovil	1,902
1970–71	Bristol City	3–1	Yeovil Town	Ashton Gate Stadium, Bristol	549
1970–71	Bristol City won 4–3 on aggregate.				
1971–72	Bristol City	6–1	Taunton Town	Wordsworth Drive, Taunton	
1971–72	Bristol City	3–1	Taunton Town	Ashton Gate Stadium, Bristol	
1971–72	Bristol City won 9–2 on aggregate.				
1972–73	Yeovil Town	0–0	Bridgwater Town	Castle Field, Bridgwater	
1972–73	Yeovil Town	3–0	Bridgwater Town	Huish Athletic Ground, Yeovil	2,120
1972–73	Yeovil Town won 3–0 on aggregate.				
1973–74	Minehead	1–0	Bristol City	Ashton Gate Stadium, Bristol	
1973–74	Minehead	3–0	Bristol City	Minehead	
1973–74	Minehead won 1–0 on aggregate.				
1974–75	Bristol City	4–0	Taunton Town	Ashton Gate Stadium, Bristol	
1974–75	Bristol City	3–0	Taunton Town	Wordsworth Drive, Taunton	
1974–75	Bristol City won 7–0 on aggregate.				
1975–76	Yeovil Town	1–1	Westland-Yeovil	Huish Athletic Ground, Yeovil	715
1975–76	Yeovil Town	4–0	Westland-Yeovil	Huish Athletic Ground, Yeovil	1,352
1975–76	Yeovil Town won 5–1 on aggregate.				
1976–77	Minehead	1–0	Yeovil Town	Castle Field, Bridgwater	
1976–77	Minehead	1–1	Yeovil Town	Huish Athletic Ground, Yeovil	
1976–77	Minehead won 2–1 on aggregate.				
1977–78	Bath City	2–1 *	Bristol City	Twerton Park, Bath	
1978–79	Yeovil Town	1–1	Minehead	Minehead	
1978–79	Yeovil Town	3–2	Minehead	Huish Athletic Ground, Yeovil	
1978–79	Yeovil Town won 4–3 on aggregate.				
1979–80	Keynsham Town	0–0	Bath City	Crown Field, Keynsham	
1979–80	Keynsham Town	1–0	Bath City	Twerton Park, Bath	
1979–80	Keynsham Town won 1–0 on aggregate.				
1980–81	Bath City	3–0	Yeovil Town	Huish Athletic Ground, Yeovil	460
1980–81	Bath City	3–0	Yeovil Town	Twerton Park, Bath	334
1980–81	Bath City won 6–0 on aggregate.				
1981–82	Bath City	1–1	Bridgwater Town	Twerton Park, Bath	
1981–82	Bath City	2–1	Bridgwater Town	Castle Field, Bridgwater	
1981–82	Bath City won 3–2 on aggregate.				
1982–83	Frome Town				
1983–84	Bath City	1–0	Clevedon Town	Teignmouth Road, Clevedon	
1983–84	Bath City	1–1	Clevedon Town	Twerton Park, Bath	
1983–84	Bath City won 2–1 on aggregate.				
1984–85	Bath City	1–0	Yeovil Town	Twerton Park, Bath	574
1984–85	Bath City	3–1	Yeovil Town	Huish Athletic Ground, Yeovil	856
1984–85	Bath City won 4–1 on aggregate.				
1985–86	Bath City	1–0	Yeovil Town	Twerton Park, Bath	779
1985–86	Bath City	2–0	Yeovil Town	Huish Athletic Ground, Yeovil	1,320
1985–86	Bath City won 3–0 on aggregate.				
1986–87	Clevedon Town	W/O (Note: After a semi-final second replay where Yeovil Town beat Bath City 2–1, Bath City protested about an ineligible player in the Yeovil Town side. The protest was upheld and the tie ordered to be replayed. However, by this time the season was nearing its close and both clubs claimed their players' contracts would not allow them to fit the replayed game in and both withdrew from the Cup giving Clevedon Town a walkover in the final.)	N/A		
1987–88	Mangotsfield United		Taunton Town		
1988–89	Bath City	2–1	Mangotsfield United	Mangotsfield	363
1988–89	Bath City	5–1	Mangotsfield United	Twerton Park, Bath	339
1988–89	Bath City won 7–2 on aggregate.				
1989–90	Bath City	1–1	Taunton Town	Wordsworth Drive, Taunton	381
1989–90	Bath City	1–0	Taunton Town	Twerton Park, Bath	498
1989–90	Bath City won 2–1 on aggregate.				
1990–91	Bristol City		Weston-super-Mare		
1990–91	Bristol City won 4–3 on aggregate.				
1991–92	Bristol Rovers	1–2	Yeovil Town	Twerton Park, Bath	457
1991–92	Bristol Rovers	2–0	Yeovil Town	Huish Park, Yeovil	1,370
1991–92	Bristol Rovers won 3–2 on aggregate.				
1992–93	Bristol Rovers	4–1	Taunton Town	Wordsworth Drive, Taunton	
1992–93	Bristol Rovers	1–0	Taunton Town	Twerton Park, Bath	
1992–93	Bristol Rovers won 5–1 on aggregate.				
1993–94	Bath City	3–2	Bristol Rovers	Twerton Park, Bath	307
1993–94	Bath City	2–2	Bristol Rovers	Twerton Park, Bath	509
1993–94	Bath City won 5–4 on aggregate.				
1994–95	Bath City	1–0	Taunton Town	Wordsworth Drive, Taunton	459
1994–95	Bath City	3–0	Taunton Town	Twerton Park, Bath	356
1994–95	Bath City won 4–0 on aggregate.				
1995–96	Brislington	1–1 † (Note: Score was 1–1 after extra time. Brislington won the penalty shoot-out 6–5.)	Mangotsfield United		
1996–97	Yeovil Town	2–1	Bristol City	Huish Park, Yeovil	1,111
1997–98	Yeovil Town	1–0	Clevedon Town	Twerton Park, Bath	478
1998–99	Clevedon Town	0–0 † (Note: Score was 3–3 after extra time. Clevedon Town won the penalty shoot-out 5–4.)	Taunton Town		
1999–2000	Bristol City	3–2	Bath City	The Hand Stadium, Clevedon	657
2000–01	Clevedon Town	1–0	Odd Down		
2001–02	Clevedon Town	2–1	Team Bath		
2002–03	Taunton Town	2–1	Yeovil Town	The Hand Stadium, Clevedon	914
2003–04	Bristol City	5–0	Brislington		
2004–05	Yeovil Town	5–0	Odd Down	Huish Park, Yeovil	2,164
2005–06	Taunton Town	3–2	Mangotsfield United	Woodspring Stadium, Weston-super-Mare	
2006–07	Team Bath	3–1	Bitton	Winterfield Road, Paulton	
2007–08	Bath City	1–1 * (Note: Match was abandoned at the end of the first period of extra time due to a floodlight failure, with the score at 1–1.)	Paulton Rovers	Woodspring Stadium, Weston-super-Mare	
2007–08	Bath City	3–0 (R)	Paulton Rovers	Twerton Park, Bath	241
2008–09	Frome Town	3–1	Paulton Rovers	West Clewes, Midsomer Norton	
2009–10	Welton Rovers	0–0 † (Note: Score was 0–0 after extra time. Welton Rovers won the penalty shoot-out 4–2.)	Bridgwater Town	Huish Park, Yeovil	407
2010–11	Weston-super-Mare	1–0	Yeovil Town	Huish Park, Yeovil	703
2011–12	Weston-super-Mare	2–1	Clevedon Town	The Hand Stadium, Clevedon	554
2012–13	Paulton Rovers	3–1	Bridgwater Town	The Hand Stadium, Clevedon	290
2013–14	Taunton Town	1–0	Frome Town	Winterfield Road, Paulton	450
2014–15	Taunton Town	1–0 *	Yeovil Town	Wordsworth Drive, Taunton	852
2015–16	Wells City	2–1	Larkhall Athletic	Wordsworth Drive, Taunton	235
2016–17	Taunton Town	4–2	Weston-super-Mare	Fairfax Park, Bridgwater	559
2017–18	Weston-super-Mare	3–2	Paulton Rovers	Badgers Hill, Frome	262
2018–19	Weston-super-Mare	2–1	Taunton Town	Woodspring Stadium, Weston-super-Mare	469
2019–20	Cancelled due to COVID-19 pandemic				
2021–22	Yeovil Town	3–0	Bath City	Huish Park, Yeovil	1,016
2022–23	Bath City	4–1	Paulton Rovers	Woodspring Stadium, Weston-super-Mare	548
2023–24	Taunton Town	3–0	Brislington	Twerton Park, Bath	196
2024–25	Weston-super-Mare	1–0	Frome Town	Twerton Park, Bath	422
2025–26	Frome Town	3–2	Portishead Town	Twerton Park, Bath	748

== Records and statistics ==
=== Performances by club ===
Performance in the Francis Hillier Premier Cup by club
Club	Winners	Runners-up	Years won	Years runner-up
Yeovil Town	25	16	1930, 1931, 1933, 1935, 1938, 1939, 1947 (shared), 1948, 1950, 1951, 1954, 1955, 1956, 1957 (shared), 1962, 1963, 1965, 1969 (shared), 1973, 1976, 1979, 1997, 1998, 2005, 2022	1929, 1932, 1937, 1946, 1959, 1967, 1968, 1971, 1977, 1981, 1985, 1986, 1992, 2003, 2011, 2015
Bath City	25	10	1929, 1932, 1934, 1936, 1946, 1947 (shared), 1952, 1953, 1958, 1960, 1966, 1968, 1970, 1978, 1981, 1982, 1984, 1985, 1986, 1989, 1990, 1994, 1995, 2008, 2023	1930, 1933, 1935, 1938, 1939, 1949, 1954, 1980, 2000, 2022
Bristol City	8	6	1957 (shared), 1964, 1971, 1972, 1975, 1991, 2000, 2004	1956, 1962, 1963, 1970, 1974, 1997
Taunton Town	6	8	2003, 2006, 2014, 2015, 2017, 2024	1972, 1975, 1988, 1990, 1993, 1995, 1999, 2019
Weston-super-Mare	5	2	2011, 2012, 2018, 2019, 2025	1991, 2017
Frome Town	5	2	1967, 1969 (shared), 1983, 2009, 2026	2014, 2025
Clevedon Town	4	3	1987, 1999, 2001, 2002	1984, 1998, 2012
Minehead	3	6	1961, 1974, 1977	1955, 1958, 1960, 1965, 1979
Glastonbury	2	2	1937, 1949	1950, 1952
Bristol Rovers	2	1	1992, 1993	1994
Bridgwater Town	1	3	1959	1951, 1973, 1982
Keynsham Town	1	0	1980	—
Mangotsfield United	1	3	1988	1989, 1996, 2006
Brislington	1	2	1996	2004, 2024
Team Bath	1	1	2007	2002
Welton Rovers	1	1	2010	1966
Paulton Rovers	1	3	2013	2009, 2018, 2023
Wells City	1	0	2016	—
Taunton Town (pre-1947)	0	2	—	1931, 1934
Street	0	2	—	1936, 1953
Odd Down	0	2	—	2001, 2005
Bridgwater United	0	2	—	2010, 2013
Ilminster Town	0	1	—	1948
Westland-Yeovil	0	1	—	1976
Bitton	0	1	—	2007
Larkhall Athletic	0	1	—	2016
Portishead Town	0	1	—	2026

== Other Somerset FA County Cup competitions ==
In addition to the Francis Hillier Premier Cup, the Somerset FA also run the following competitions, which are also often referred to as the Somerset FA County Cup:

- Somerset FA Senior Cup
- Somerset FA Junior Cup
- Somerset FA Intermediate Cup
- Somerset FA Sunday Challenge Cup
- Somerset FA Legends League Cup
- Somerset FA Women's Senior Cup
- Somerset FA Women's Junior Cup
- Somerset FA Youth Shield (Under 16)
- Somerset FA Girls U16 Cup
- Somerset FA Boys U15 Cup
- Somerset FA Lewin Cup (Under 14)
- Somerset FA Girls U14 Cup
- Somerset FA Boys U13 Cup
