= Gavin Williams (footballer) =

Welsh footballer & manager (born 1980)

Personal information
- Full name: Gavin John Williams
- Date of birth: 20 July 1980 (age 46)
- Place of birth: Merthyr Tydfil, Wales
- Height: 5 ft 10 in (1.78 m)
- Position: Midfielder

Youth career
- 1996–1997: Hereford United

Senior career*
Years	Team	Apps	(Gls)
1997–2002	Hereford United	169	(30)
2002–2004	Yeovil Town	93	(17)
2004–2006	West Ham United	10	(1)
2005–2006	→ Ipswich Town (loan)	9	(1)
2006–2008	Ipswich Town	45	(2)
2008–2011	Bristol City	52	(3)
2010	→ Yeovil Town (loan)	8	(5)
2010	→ Yeovil Town (loan)	12	(1)
2011	Bristol Rovers	19	(2)
2011–2013	Yeovil Town	52	(7)
2013	Woking	16	(5)
2013–2020	Merthyr Town	60	
Total		605	(74)

International career^{‡}
2002	Wales Semi-Pro	3	(0)
2005	Wales	2	(0)

Managerial career
- 2014–2016: Merthyr Town (assistant)
- 2016–2021: Merthyr Town
- * Club domestic league appearances and goals as of 17:28, 30 December 2013 (UTC) ‡ National team caps and goals as of 13:18, 30 October 2008 (UTC)

Gavin John Williams (born 20 July 1980) is a Welsh football coach and former player who was most recently the manager of Merthyr Town.

== Club career ==
=== Hereford United ===
Williams started his career as a YTS player at Hereford United having previously trained with Cardiff City. He made his first team debut at the age of 17, as a substitute in the 3–0 FA Cup victory over Sittingbourne. He made twelve more appearances that season and scored his first goal against Dover Athletic in the Conference. By the 1998–99 season he was a first team regular playing in a variety of positions in midfield and up front. He was to spend five seasons at Edgar Street, notably scoring a wonder strike against Swindon Town in the 2001–02 FA Cup second round.

=== Yeovil Town ===
At the age of 21 he moved to Hereford's rivals Yeovil Town for the 2002–03 season, having rejected a new contract offer at Edgar Street. Hereford received a £22,500 fee for their leading goalscorer plus a 25% next sale clause, which earned the Bulls a further £62,500 in 2004.

At Huish Park he was an integral part in the squad which in that season gained promotion to the football league for the first time, scoring six goals, the same season in which his team reached the sixth round of the FA Trophy. He also won the Player of the Year award for his club, an ever-present rock in the midfield.

=== West Ham ===
It wasn't long before West Ham United decided to swoop for him, purchasing him in December 2004 for £250,000. But his last act in his last game for Yeovil was to be sent off.

He made his West Ham debut on Boxing Day 2004, coming on as a substitute against Nottingham Forest in a 3–2 win. He made a further nine appearances in the West Ham team, as they gained promotion to the Premiership, scoring his first goal against Leeds United. By November 2005 he had been loaned out to Ipswich Town after struggling to gain a first-team place at West Ham. The loan spell was a success and the deal was made permanent in January 2006 for a fee of £300,000.

=== Ipswich Town ===
In November 2005, Williams joined Ipswich Town on loan after struggling to gain a first-team place at West Ham. He scored on his debut for the club on 19 November in a 1–1 draw with Coventry City. The loan spell was a success and the deal was made permanent in January 2006 for a fee of £300,000.

Williams featured more regularly during the 2006–07 season. He scored his first goal of the season on 16 December, scoring the winning goal in a 1–0 home win over Leeds United at Portman Road. On 1 January has again scored the winning goal in a 1–0 home win over Birmingham City. He made 32 appearances in all competitions in the season, scoring twice. He won the club's goal of the season award for his strike against Leeds.

During the 2007–08 season Williams saw his game time reduced, making 10 starts and 3 substitute appearances in the league as Ipswich finished 8th in the Championship, one point off the Championship Play-offs.

=== Bristol City ===
On 27 June 2008, he joined Bristol City on a two-year contract for an undisclosed fee. Williams made his debut for Bristol City on 9 August 2008, starting in a 0–1 away win over Blackpool at Bloomfield Road. He scored his first goal for the club on 21 October 2008, netting in a 0–2 away win over Charlton Athletic at The Valley.

==== Yeovil Town (loan) ====
Williams returned to Yeovil on a one-month loan, on 11 March 2010 from Bristol City. In his first game on 13 March, he scored a free kick, created one goal and got sent off all in just over an hour. His loan was extended until the end of the season and he scored five times and got four assists in eight games.

On 9 September 2010, Williams returned to Yeovil for a three-month loan.

=== Bristol Rovers ===
On 31 January 2011 he was released by Bristol City and signed for arch rivals Bristol Rovers. He scored his first goal for Bristol Rovers in a west country derby win over Yeovil Town. He was one of seventeen players released by the team in May 2011.

=== Yeovil Town ===
On 15 June 2011 it was confirmed that Williams would be returning to Yeovil Town for the new season and scored his first goal of the season against Walsall. He also scored in two consecutive games against MK Dons and Oldham Athletic, with Yeovil winning both. On 8 May 2012, Williams signed a new one-year contract with the Glovers. On 19 May 2013, Williams was an unused substitute in the 2013 League One play-off final, although he was cautioned for time wasting, as Yeovil won promotion to the Championship for the first time in the club's history. Williams was released by Yeovil at the end of the season having not been offered a new contract.

=== Woking ===
On 22 July 2013, Williams signed for Woking for the forthcoming season. However, due to family issues his contract was terminated on 20 December 2013 and left the club with full respect of the manager and supporters.

=== Merthyr Town ===
On 30 December 2013, Williams signed for his home town club Merthyr Town and made his debut for the Martyrs on 4 January 2014 in a 3–2 win against North Leigh. On 23 May 2014, Williams was appointed player/assistant manager at Merthyr alongside current Merthyr player Steve Williams and both would serve under newly appointed Merthyr manager Steve Jenkins.

== International career ==
After representing Wales Semi-Pro in 2002, Williams made his international debut for Wales on 17 August 2005, featuring as a second-half substitute in a 0–0 draw with Slovenia at the Liberty Stadium, Wales. He made his second appearance for his country on 16 November 2005, again featuring as a substitute in a 1–0 loss to Cyprus at Tsirion Stadium, Cyprus.

== Managerial career ==
On 27 May 2016, after the resignation of Jenkins, Williams was appointed manager of Merthyr Town. In January 2021, Williams decided to leave his role as manager of Merthyr Town.

== Personal life ==
Williams' younger brother Lewis is a rugby union player. Gavin's son, Jay, is also a footballer, who played for the Fulham F.C. Academy.

== Career statistics ==
=== Club ===
Appearances and goals by club, season and competition
Club	Season	League			FA Cup		League Cup		Other		Total	
Club	Season	Division	Apps	Goals	Apps	Goals	Apps	Goals	Apps	Goals	Apps	Goals
Hereford United	1997–98	Conference	10	1	2	0	—		1 (Note: Appearance(s) in FA Trophy)	0	13	1
Hereford United	1998–99	Conference	38	6	1	1	—		5 (Note: Two appearances in FA Trophy, two appearances in Conference League Cup, one appearance in President's Cup)	0	44	7
Hereford United	1999–2000	Conference	41	6	5	1	—		5 (Note: Two appearances in FA Trophy, two appearances in Conference League Cup, one appearance in Herefordshire Senior Cup)	0	51	7
Hereford United	2000–01	Conference	39	8	0	0	—		10 (Note: Eight appearances and three goals in FA Trophy, two appearances and two goals in Football League Trophy)	5	49	13
Hereford United	2001–02	Conference	41	9	3	2	—		4	3	48	14
Hereford United	Total		169	30	11	4	—		25	8	205	42
Yeovil Town	2002–03	Conference	38	6	2	0	—		6 (Note: Four appearances in FA Trophy, one appearance in Football League Trophy, one appearance in Somerset Premier Cup)	0	46	6
Yeovil Town	2003–04	Third Division	42	9	3	3	1	0	2 (Note: Appearances in Football League Trophy)	1	48	13
Yeovil Town	2004–05	League Two	13	2	2	0	1	0	0	0	16	2
Yeovil Town	Total		93	17	7	3	2	0	8	1	110	21
West Ham United	2004–05	Championship	10	1	—		—		0	0	10	1
West Ham United	2005–06	Premier League	0	0	0	0	1	0	—		1	0
West Ham United	Total		10	1	0	0	1	0	0	0	11	1
Ipswich Town	2005–06	Championship	12	1	1	0	—		—		13	1
Ipswich Town	2006–07	Championship	29	2	3	0	0	0	—		32	2
Ipswich Town	2007–08	Championship	13	0	1	0	0	0	—		14	0
Ipswich Town	Total		54	3	5	0	0	0	—		59	3
Bristol City	2008–09	Championship	35	3	1	0	1	0	—		37	3
Bristol City	2009–10	Championship	14	0	1	1	2	0	—		17	1
Bristol City	2010–11	Championship	3	0	0	0	1	0	—		4	0
Bristol City	Total		52	3	2	1	4	0	—		58	4
Yeovil Town (loan)	2009–10	League One	8	5	—		—		—		8	5
Yeovil Town (loan)	2010–11	League One	12	1	—		—		—		12	1
Bristol Rovers	2010–11	League One	19	2	—		—		—		19	2
Yeovil Town	2011–12	League One	28	4	1	0	1	0	0	0	30	4
Yeovil Town	2012–13	League One	24	3	1	0	0	0	3	0	28	3
Yeovil Town	Total		52	7	2	0	1	0	3	0	58	7
Woking	2013–14	Conference Premier	16	5	1	0	—		1 (Note: Appearance in Surrey Senior Cup)	1	18	6
Career total			485	74	28	8	8	0	37	10	558	92

=== International ===
Appearances and goals by national team and year
National team	Year	Apps	Goals
Wales	2005	2	0
Total		2	0

== Honours ==
Yeovil Town

- Football League One play-offs: 2013
- Football League Two: 2004–05
- Football Conference: 2002–03

West Ham United

- Football League Championship play-offs: 2005

Merthyr Town

- Southern League Division One South & West: 2014–15
- Southern League Cup: 2015–16

Individual

- Yeovil Town Player of the Year: 2003–04
- Ipswich Town Goal of the Season: 2006–07
