= Lewis Williams =

Lewis Williams may refer to:

- Lewis Williams (politician) (1782–1842), American politician
- Lewis Williams (boxer) (born 1998), English boxer
- Lewy Williams (Lewis Williams, born 2002), Welsh darts player
- Lewis Williams (real tennis) (born 1994), British real tennis player
- Lewis Williams (rugby union) (born 1987), Welsh rugby union player
- Lewis B. Williams Jr. (1833–1863), Confederate officer during the American Civil War
- Lewis A. Williams (1852–1935), Chicago saloonkeeper and co-creator of Cohasset Punch

== See also ==
- Lew Williams (1934–2019), American singer
- Louis Williams (disambiguation)
- David Lewis-Williams (born 1934), South African scholar
