= 2022–23 FA Cup qualifying rounds =

Tournament details
- Country: England; Wales
- Teams: 640

The 2022–23 FA Cup qualifying rounds opened the 142nd edition of the FA Cup, the world's oldest association football single knockout competition, organised by The Football Association, the governing body for the sport in England. 640 teams in the 5th to 10th tier of English football competed across six rounds for 32 spots in the first round proper.

== Eligibility ==
Applications to enter qualifying opened on 25 February 2022 and closed on 1 April 2022. The entry list, round exemptions and scheduling was confirmed on 1 July 2022. 640 teams from Level 5 to Level 9 of the English football league system (otherwise known as Steps 1 to 5 of the National League System) were eligible to compete.

In previous years Level 10 clubs were a prominent feature in the competition but since 2021–22 The FA has cut off their automatic eligibility. This was the result of the National League System being reformed to what the FA described as a "perfect 1–2–4–8–16 divisional model". A first phase was implemented in 2018/19 before a final stage saw over 100 clubs effectively promoted in 2021–22. This meant more teams now competed between Level 5 to 9 which consequently for the FA Cup saw Level 10 clubs dropped to a "subject to availability" basis instead. In the event that others do not enter, vacancies are filled by 10th tier applicants ranked by PPG in the previous league season.

For the 2022–23 edition, 11 vacancies were filled by 10th tier clubs; Abbey Hey, Andover New Street, Brixham, Folland Sports, Hinckley, Liskeard Athletic, New Mills, Newport (IOW), Radford, Warminster Town, and Wincanton Town.

Vacancies are created when eligible teams from Level 5 to 9 decide against entering or have their application rejected. For 2022–23, there were 11 such clubs:

Team (level)	status	Date
Guernsey (8);	did not appear on the entry list.	1 July 2022
Eastwood (9);	did not appear on the entry list.	1 July 2022
Farnham Town (9);	did not appear on the entry list.	1 July 2022
FC Isle of Man (9);	did not appear on the entry list.	1 July 2022
GNG Oadby Town (9);	did not appear on the entry list.	1 July 2022
Harleston Town (9);	did not appear on the entry list.	1 July 2022
Hemsworth Miners Welfare (9);	did not appear on the entry list.	1 July 2022
Uttoxeter Town (9);	did not appear on the entry list.	1 July 2022
Wallingford & Crowmarsh (9);	did not appear on the entry list.	1 July 2022
Woodbridge Town (9);	did not appear on the entry list.	1 July 2022
Jersey Bulls (9);	withdrew from the competition citing travel expenses and the use of replays.	6 July 2022

Staines Town (9) did not appear on the entry list either before the club resigned from their league altogether on 4 July 2022. Hilltop were awarded a late promotion to fulfill the vacancy created. A Level 10 club when entry was announced three days prior, Hilltop were also without a FA Cup place before they were then accepted as a replacement to Jersey.

Amongst the 640 clubs entered into qualifying, nine were debutants; Buckhurst Hill, Bury AFC, Darlaston Town, Golcar United, Hilltop, Midhurst & Easebourne, Roffey, Shefford Town & Campton, and Worcester Raiders.

== Format ==
The qualifying competition was a single-elimination tournament consisting of six rounds and 640 teams. 32 winners in the final round were awarded a place in the main competition beginning in November. Teams entered at different stages depending on their position in the English pyramid. All 9th and 10th tier teams began in the opening, Extra-Preliminary round and had to win six matches to qualify. All 8th tier teams were ranked on last season's PPG, except newly promoted teams automatically ranked towards the bottom and newly relegated teams ranked towards the top; Then the 95 lowest ranked teams entered at the Extra-Preliminary round and the 64 highest ranked teams entered at the preliminary round. Teams entering at the preliminary round had to win five matches to qualify. All 7th tier teams entered at the 1st qualifying round and had to win 4 matches to qualify. 6th tier teams entered at the 2nd qualifying round and had to win three matches to qualify. 5th tier teams entered at the final, 4th qualifying round and had to win one match to qualify.

Matches ending in a tie were replayed once and thereafter decided by extra time and penalties if the scores remained level. Ties were played on a geographical basis, starting with 10 regionalised pots in the Extra-Preliminary and preliminary rounds, and gradually reducing further into the draw. Whilst the division of the English football league system correlated closer to club density, the FA Cup grouped teams based more on travel distance. Therefore, pots could consist of an unequal number of teams.

Round	Main date	Leagues entering this round	New entries this round	Winners from the previous round	Number of fixtures	Prize fund	
Round	Main date	Leagues entering this round	New entries this round	Winners from the previous round	Number of fixtures	Losing club	Winning club
Extra preliminary round	6 August 2022	Level 8 (95 lowest ranked clubs); Level 9 Level 10 (highest ranked clubs)	416	none	208	£375	£1,125
Preliminary round	20 August 2022	Level 8	64	208	136	£481	£1,444
First qualifying round	3 September 2022	Level 7	88	136	112	£750	£2,250
Second qualifying round	17 September 2022	National League North; National League South	48	112	80	£1,125	£3,375
Third qualifying round	1 October 2022	none	0	80	40	£1,875	£5,625
Fourth qualifying round	15 October 2022	National League	24	40	32	£3,125	£9,375

== Extra preliminary round ==
The extra preliminary and preliminary rounds were drawn on 8 July 2022. Teams were drawn into 10 regionalised groups loosely based on travel distance. More club-dense regions drew bigger pot sizes; One contained 86 teams loosely correlated to the Combined Counties North and South, the Southern Combination, and the Southern Counties East Level 9 Divisions. Regions with fewer clubs drew smaller pot sizes combining fewer divisions; One pot contained just 20 teams loosely correlating to the Western League Level 9 division.

416 teams entered at this round; 310 from Level 9 (plus ten Level 10 replacements) and the 95 lowest ranked clubs from Level 8 (plus a Level 10 replacement for Guernsey). A team at this stage must win six matches should it qualify as one of the 32 non-league clubs in the FA Cup proper; as many victories as it takes a Premier League or Championship side to win the whole competition.

Tie	Home team (Tier) (Note: (10) represents teams allocated to divisions at the 10th tier of English football (otherwise known as Step 6 of the National League System). (9) represents the 9th tier (Step 5 NLS). (8) represents the 8th tier (Step 4 NLS). Hilltop were initially in the 10th tier when allocations were published but subsequently replaced Staines Town in the 9th tier)	Score	Away team (Tier)	Att.
Friday 5 August 2022
6	Redcar Athletic (9)	1–2	Seaham Red Star (9)	485
53	Market Drayton Town (9)	2–1	Shifnal Town (9)	298
79	Wroxham (8)	1–2	Dereham Town (8)	520
80	Walsham-le-Willows (9)	1–6	St Neots Town (8)	142
85	Thetford Town (9)	2–2	Soham Town Rangers (9)	201
93	Stansted (9)	1–0	Hadley (8)	214
126	Ascot United (9)	2–1	Cribbs (9)	
133	Bishop's Cleeve (8)	4–1	Wantage Town (9)	250
185	Baffins Milton Rovers (9)	4–1	Alton (9)	
Saturday 6 August 2022
1	North Shields (8)	2–1	Knaresborough Town (9)	259
2	Garforth Town (9)	0–1	Pontefract Collieries (8)	246
3	Newcastle Benfield (9)	2–0	Crook Town (9)	115
4	Goole (9)	4–1	Consett (8)	177
5	Sunderland RCA (9)	3–1	Hebburn Town (8)	152
7	West Auckland Town (9)	1–2	Carlisle City (9)	165
9	Bridlington Town (8)	3–1	Whitley Bay (9)	288
10	Thornaby (9)	1–3	Kendal Town (9)	142
11	Tadcaster Albion (8)	1–1	Tow Law Town (9)	133
12	Ashington (9)	3–2	Newton Aycliffe (9)	276
13	North Ferriby (9)	3–0	Northallerton Town (9)	371
14	Guisborough Town (9)	0–1	Bishop Auckland (9)	364
15	Penrith (9)	0–2	West Allotment Celtic (9)	165
16	Heaton Stannington (9)	1–0	Pickering Town (9)	233
17	Thackley (9)	1–1	Ramsbottom United (8)	156
18	Yorkshire Amateur (9)	2–2	Charnock Richard (9)	
19	Silsden (9)	1–0	Burscough (9)	
20	Whitchurch Alport (9)	2–0	Vauxhall Motors (9)	212
21	Wythenshawe Town (9)	0–2	Macclesfield (8)	1122
22	Colne (8)	2–1	1874 Northwich (8)	238
24	Glossop North End (8)	1–0	Emley (9)	255
25	Skelmersdale United (8)	2–1	Padiham (9)	132
26	Longridge Town (9)	0–1	West Didsbury & Chorlton (9)	309
27	Ossett United (8)	2–0	New Mills (10)	275
28	Prestwich Heys (9)	1–1	Litherland REMYCA (9)	201
29	Trafford (8)	6–0	AFC Liverpool (9)	471
30	Winsford United (9)	1–1	Widnes (8)	190
31	Irlam (9)	0–4	Avro (9)	125
32	Barnoldswick Town (9)	1–1	Albion Sports (9)	185
33	Stocksbridge Park Steels (8)	3–0	Golcar United (9)	196
34	Lower Breck (9)	0–2	Penistone Church (9)	104
35	Eccleshill United (9)	0–4	Sheffield (8)	81
36	Prescot Cables (8)	1–1	Ashton Athletic (9)	383
37	Squires Gate (9)	1–2	Northwich Victoria (9)	136
38	Abbey Hey (10)	0–4	Congleton Town (9)	131
40	Daventry Town (8)	2–2	Worcester Raiders (9)	132
41	Malvern Town (9)	2–1	Worcester City (9)	895
42	Coventry Sphinx (9)	0–1	Bedworth United (8)	151
43	Atherstone Town (9)	2–1	Gresley Rovers (8)	524
44	Darlaston Town (1874) (9)	0–4	Tividale (9)	
45	Hereford Lads Club (9)	1–5	Hanley Town (8)	120
46	Bugbrooke St Michaels (9)	3–0	Long Buckby (9)	140
48	Racing Club Warwick (9)	2–1	Bewdley Town (9)	211
49	AFC Wulfrunians (9)	1–2	Newcastle Town (8)	155
50	Heanor Town (9)	1–5	Studley (9)	155
51	Romulus (9)	2–0	Sutton Coldfield Town (8)	160
52	Evesham United (8)	1–2	Hinckley LR (8)	181
54	Coventry United (9)	2–2	Highgate United (9)	
55	Westfields (9)	2–2	Rugby Town (9)	
56	Boldmere St. Michaels (8)	1–0	Walsall Wood (9)	158
58	Cogenhoe United (9)	1–1	Stone Old Alleynians (9)	
59	Hereford Pegasus (9)	0–6	Stourport Swifts (9)	73
60	Kimberley Miners Welfare (9)	5–1	Lutterworth Town (9)	102
61	Loughborough Students (9)	5–1	Newark and Sherwood United (9)	
62	Spalding United (8)	2–1	Deeping Rangers (9)	226
63	Skegness Town (9)	2–0	Loughborough Dynamo (8)	202
64	Melton Town (9)	2–2	Pinchbeck United (9)	182
65	Leicester Nirvana (9)	1–1	Selston (9)	
66	Anstey Nomads (9)	1–1	Radford (10)	180
67	Shepshed Dynamo (8)	0–0	Winterton Rangers (9)	201
68	Grimsby Borough (8)	2–3	Lincoln United (8)	100
69	Bottesford Town (9)	1–1	Barton Town (9)	165
70	Sherwood Colliery (9)	2–2	Long Eaton United (8)	186
71	Maltby Main (9)	0–1	Quorn (9)	137
72	Handsworth (9)	1–0	Sleaford Town (9)	158
73	Boston Town (9)	0–0	Harborough Town (8)	98
74	Corby Town (8)	0–1	AFC Mansfield (9)	427
75	Hadleigh United (9)	0–1	Mildenhall Town (9)	
76	Kempston Rovers (8)	2–0	Long Melford (9)	78
77	Gorleston (8)	4–0	Biggleswade United (9)	140
78	Desborough Town (9)	0–0	Histon (9)	
81	March Town United (9)	1–2	Sheringham (9)	
82	Wisbech Town (9)	5–1	Ely City (9)	185
83	Godmanchester Rovers (9)	3–0	Rothwell Corinthians (9)	
84	Haverhill Rovers (9)	0–0	Mulbarton Wanderers (9)	
86	Eynesbury Rovers (9)	1–3	Newmarket Town (9)	154
87	Kirkley & Pakefield (9)	1–2	Fakenham Town (9)	
88	Lakenheath (9)	0–4	Bury Town (8)	235
89	Whitton United (9)	3–2	Wellingborough Town (9)	59
90	Ipswich Wanderers (9)	1–0	Yaxley (8)	98
91	Norwich United (9)	2–3	Potton United (9)	142
92	Coggeshall Town (8)	0–0	Barking (9)	88
94	Leighton Town (9)	9–2	Baldock Town (9)	
95	Brantham Athletic (9)	3–0	Basildon United (8)	77
96	Stotfold (9)	2–2	Newport Pagnell Town (9)	281
97	London Colney (9)	0–5	Witham Town (8)	30
98	Leverstock Green (9)	3–0	Halstead Town (9)	
100	Shefford Town & Campton (9)	4–1	Stanway Rovers (9)	
101	Redbridge (9)	1–2	Takeley (9)	
102	Heybridge Swifts (8)	4–0	Clapton (9)	231
103	Buckhurst Hill (9)	2–1	Walthamstow (8)	366
104	Little Oakley (9)	1–2	FC Clacton (9)	174
105	Harpenden Town (9)	2–1	New Salamis (8)	105
106	Southend Manor (9)	1–0	Cockfosters (9)	
107	Milton Keynes Irish (9)	2–4	Tilbury (8)	101
109	White Ensign (9)	1–2	St. Panteleimon (9)	
110	West Essex (9)	2–1	Crawley Green (9)	
111	Enfield (9)	3–1	Hullbridge Sports (8)	192
112	Barton Rovers (8)	1–1	Arlesey Town (9)	112
113	Hertford Town (8)	1–1	Colney Heath (9)	223
114	Waltham Abbey (8)	4–1	Woodford Town (9)	152
115	Dunstable Town (9)	2–0	Great Wakering Rovers (8)	175
116	Romford (9)	5–2	Saffron Walden Town (9)	98
117	Ilford (9)	4–1	Sawbridgeworth Town (9)	
118	Ashton & Backwell United (9)	0–2	Aylesbury United (8)	85
119	Flackwell Heath (9)	4–0	Keynsham Town (9)	252
120	Brimscombe & Thrupp (9)	2–1	Fairford Town (9)	72
121	Ardley United (9)	3–2	Wokingham & Emmbrook (9)	
122	Longlevens (9)	2–3	Aylesbury Vale Dynamos (9)	91
123	Risborough Rangers (9)	0–1	Holyport (9)	175
124	Highworth Town (8)	0–2	Reading City (9)	89
125	Tuffley Rovers (9)	1–2	Slimbridge (8)	186
127	Clevedon Town (9)	2–1	Chalfont St Peter (9)	95
128	Burnham (9)	1–1	Easington Sports (9}	79
129	Thornbury Town (9)	1–3	Chipping Sodbury Town (9)	81
130	Royal Wootton Bassett Town (9)	1–1	Windsor (9)	119
131	Bitton (9)	1–3	Cinderford Town (8)	71
132	Cadbury Heath (9)	2–2	Mangotsfield United (9)	170

Tie	Home team (Tier)	Score	Away team (Tier)	Att.
134	Roman Glass St George (9)	3–1	Tring Athletic (9)	95
135	Lydney Town (9)	2–4	Kidlington (8)	170
136	Didcot Town (8)	1–1	Shrivenham (9)	166
137	Canterbury City (9)	1–1	Newhaven (9)	95
138	Raynes Park Vale (9)	1–1	Erith & Belvedere (9)	
139	Rusthall (9)	3–2	Loxwood (9)	222
140	Glebe (9)	4–3	Holmesdale (9)	144
141	Horsham YMCA (9)	0–3	Beckenham Town (8)	100
143	Virginia Water (9)	1–0	Hilltop (9)	
144	Whitehawk (8)	0–0	K Sports (9)	
145	Banstead Athletic (9)	0–1	Sheerwater (9)	
146	Southall (8)	0–0	Redhill (9)	58
147	Harefield United (9)	3–2	Lordswood (9)	110
148	Pagham (9)	0–4	Erith Town (9)	115
149	Chipstead (8)	1–2	Tunbridge Wells (9)	110
150	Punjab United (9)	2–1	Balham (9)	63
151	Alfold (9)	1–4	Knaphill (9)	117
152	East Grinstead Town (8)	1–0	Hollands & Blair (9)	143
153	Lancing (8)	4–0	Roffey (9)	137
154	Oxhey Jets (9)	1–3	Phoenix Sports (9)	123
155	Deal Town (9)	2–2	Egham Town (9)	326
156	Hassocks (9)	1–0	Lingfield (9)	124
157	Broadfields United (9)	1–2	Guildford City (9)	
158	Sutton Athletic (9)	1–0	Welling Town (9)	70
159	Eastbourne Town (9)	2–1	Steyning Town (9)	152
160	Crowborough Athletic (9)	2–3	Crawley Down Gatwick (9)	
162	Faversham Town (8)	0–1	Colliers Wood United (9)	179
163	Horley Town (9)	0–5	Sevenoaks Town (8)	
164	Westfield (8)	2–0	Eastbourne United (9)	102
165	Peacehaven & Telscombe (9)	2–2	AFC Croydon Athletic (9)	151
166	Three Bridges (8)	3–0	Whitstable Town (9)	129
167	Chichester City (8)	4–0	Frimley Green (9)	140
169	AFC Uckfield Town (9)	1–4	Midhurst & Easebourne (9)	86
170	Northwood (8)	2–1	South Park Reigate (8)	128
171	Saltdean United (9)	0–8	Ashford Town (8)	130
172	Walton & Hersham (8)	2–2	Kennington (9)	303
173	Littlehampton Town (8)	3–1	Broadbridge Heath (9)	429
174	Cobham (9)	0–3	Tooting & Mitcham United (8)	100
175	Abbey Rangers (9)	0–3	Hanworth Villa (8)	207
176	Fisher (9)	0–0	Sutton Common Rovers (8)	168
177	Bexhill United (9)	2–3	North Greenford United (9)	97
178	Bearsted (9)	3–3	Spelthorne Sports (9)	111
179	AFC Varndeanians (9)	0–1	Hythe Town (8)	90
180	Bradford Town (9)	0–4	Hamworthy United (8)	113
181	Alresford Town (9)	2–2	Laverstock & Ford (9)	
182	Fareham Town (9)	3–1	Hythe & Dibden (9)	216
183	Badshot Lea (9)	4–0	Brockenhurst (9)	111
184	Lymington Town (8)	2–0	Portland United (9)	110
186	Warminster Town (10)	0–2	Andover New Street (10)	101
187	Welton Rovers (9)	0–1	United Services Portsmouth (9)	
188	Thatcham Town (8)	2–3	Horndean (9)	151
189	Corsham Town (9)	0–2	AFC Portchester (9)	
191	Larkhall Athletic (8)	4–1	Folland Sports (10)	100
192	Westbury United (8)	2–1	Bournemouth (9)	102
193	Cowes Sports (9)	1–0	Hamble Club (9)	93
194	Fleet Town (9)	1–3	Newport (IOW) (10)	
195	Christchurch (9)	2–3	Blackfield & Langley (9)	69
196	Tadley Calleva (9)	2–6	Wincanton Town (10)	
197	Moneyfields (9)	5–0	Bemerton Heath Harlequins (9)	65
198	AFC Stoneham (9)	2–1	Bashley (8)	103
199	Street (9)	1–2	Helston Athletic (9)	
200	Buckland Athletic (9)	2–1	Exmouth Town (8)	216
201	Willand Rovers (8)	2–1	Wellington (9)	217
202	Liskeard Athletic (10)	1–4	Shepton Mallet (9)	
203	Torpoint Athletic (9)	1–1	Millbrook (9)	221
204	Tavistock (8)	2–3	Brixham (10)	141
205	Falmouth Town (9)	2–1	Saltash United (9)	330
206	Bideford (8)	1–0	Bridgwater United (9)	215
207	Sherborne Town (9)	1–1	Ilfracombe Town (9)	126
208	Barnstaple Town (9)	1–1	Mousehole (9)	143
Sunday 7 August 2022
8	Whickham (9)	2–1	Frickley Athletic (9)	
23	Hallam (9)	0–0	Bury AFC (9)	1,128
39	Lye Town (9)	4–1	Heather St John's (9)	
47	Hinckley (10)	1–3	Wolverhampton Casuals (9)	
57	Belper United (9)	0–3	Lichfield City (9)	178
99	FC Romania (8)	2–0	London Lions (9)	70
108	Edgware & Kingsbury (9)	2–1	Hoddesdon Town (9)	109
142	Stansfeld (9)	4–1	Wembley (9)	154
161	Little Common (9)	1–2	Chatham Town (8)	237
Tuesday 9 August 2022
168	Athletic Newham (9)	3–3	Sheppey United (8)	188
190	Shaftesbury (9)	2–2	Camberley Town (9)	
Replays
Tuesday 9 August 2022
11R	Tow Law Town (9)	2–0	Tadcaster Albion (8)	178
17R	Ramsbottom United (8)	2–0	Thackley (9)	254
18R	Charnock Richard (9)	2–0	Yorkshire Amateur (9)	
30R	Widnes (8)	2–0	Winsford United (9)	183
36R	Ashton Athletic (9)	1–2	Prescot Cables (8)	229
54R	Highgate United (9)	4–0	Coventry United (9)	
55R	Rugby Town (9)	1–0	Westfields (9)	
58R	Stone Old Alleynians (9)	2–1	Cogenhoe United (9)	
65R	Selston (9)	1–2	Leicester Nirvana (9)	
Match played at Leicester Nirvana.
66R	Radford (10)	1–3	Anstey Nomads (9)	
69R	Barton Town (9)	3–3 (1–4 p)	Bottesford Town (9)	
70R	Long Eaton United (8)	3–0	Sherwood Colliery (9)	241
73R	Harborough Town (8)	3–0	Boston Town (9)	217
78R	Histon (9)	4–0	Desborough Town (9)	
84R	Mulbarton Wanderers (9)	A–W	Haverhill Rovers (9)	
Mulbarton Wanderers originally won 3-2, but were later disqualified after fielding an ineligible player.
85R	Soham Town Rangers (9)	2–0	Thetford Town (9)	
92R	Barking (9)	2–1	Coggeshall Town (8)	91
96R	Newport Pagnell Town (9)	1–2	Stotfold (9)	
112R	Arlesey Town (9)	0–3	Barton Rovers (8)	147
113R	Colney Heath (9)	1–6	Hertford Town (8)	205
128R	Easington Sports (9)	0–0 (5–4 p)	Burnham (9)	
130R	Windsor (9)	0–2	Royal Wootton Bassett Town (9)	
132R	Mangotsfield United (9)	2–5	Cadbury Heath (9)	
136R	Shrivenham (9)	3–4	Didcot Town (8)	180
138R	Erith & Belvedere (9)	2–3	Raynes Park Vale (9)	154
146R	Redhill (9)	1–3	Southall (8)	112
155R	Egham Town (9)	0–1	Deal Town (9)	
165R	AFC Croydon Athletic (9)	0–3	Peacehaven & Telscombe (9)	
Match played at Sheppey United.
172R	Kennington (9)	0–4	Walton & Hersham (8)	
178R	Spelthorne Sports (9)	3–1	Bearsted (9)	
181R	Laverstock & Ford (9)	4–0	Alresford Town (9)	
203R	Millbrook (9)	0–1	Torpoint Athletic (9)	
207R	Ilfracombe Town (9)	2–0	Sherborne Town (9)	
Match played at Bideford.
208R	Mousehole (9)	3–2	Barnstaple Town (9)	312
Wednesday 10 August 2022
23R	Bury AFC (9)	1–0	Hallam (9)	789
28R	Litherland REMYCA (9)	3–4	Prestwich Heys (9)	
32R	Albion Sports (9)	2–2 (4–3 p)	Barnoldswick Town (9)	
40R	Worcester Raiders (9)	4–2	Daventry Town (8)	480
64R	Pinchbeck United (9)	3–2	Melton Town (9)	
67R	Winterton Rangers (9)	1–3 (a.e.t.)	Shepshed Dynamo (8)	183
137R	Newhaven (9)	10–0	Canterbury City (9)	
144R	K Sports (9)	3–2 (a.e.t.)	Whitehawk (8)	
176R	Sutton Common Rovers (8)	0–1	Fisher (9)	113
Tuesday 16 August 2022
168R	Sheppey United (8)	6–0	Athletic Newham (9)	180
Wednesday 17 August 2022
190R	Camberley Town (9)	2–1	Shaftesbury (9)	

=== Review ===
The round featured a record 208 fixtures plus replays. Amongst them, Holyport won their first ever match in the competition in what was their 9th Extra–Preliminary appearance; Keynsham Town set a record for the most consecutive campaigns ending at this stage (with 12); and Newhaven's 10–0 win over Canterbury City was the 8th highest margin of victory in replay history.

Newport (IOW) teenager, Finn Smith, became the youngest ever FA Cup goalscorer a day after his 16th birthday. Elsewhere, Moneyfields forward, Callum Laycock, scored all the goals in their 5–0 win over Bemerton Heath Harlequins.

==== Upsets ====
Giantkiller (tier)	Opponent (tier)
Upset of two leagues above
Brixham (level 10)	3—2 away vs Tavistock (level 8)

== Preliminary round ==
The draw for the preliminary round was also made on 8 July 2022. The same 10 regionalised pots were used.

272 teams made an appearance; 64 newly entered from Level 8 and 208 winners from the previous round. Four teams in Level 10 were still standing; Andover New Street, Brixham, Newport (IOW), and Wincanton Town. Five debutants also remained in the competition; Buckhurst Hill, Bury AFC, Midhurst & Easebourne, Shefford Town & Campton, and Worcester Raiders.

Number of non-league teams per tier still in qualifying
National League (Note: National League teams joined in the fourth round of qualifying)	North/South (Note: National League North/South teams joined in the second round of qualifying.)	Premier Division (Note: Premier Division teams joined in the first round of qualifying.)	Division One	Regional	Step 6	Total
24 / 24	48 / 48	88 / 88	64 / 64	204 / 204	4 / 4	432 / 432

Tie	Home team (Tier) (Note: (10) represents teams allocated to divisions at the 10th tier of English football (otherwise known as Step 6 of the National League System). (9) represents the 9th tier (Step 5 NLS). (8) represents the 8th tier (Step 4 NLS).)	Score	Away team (Tier)	Att.
Friday 19 August 2022
23	Northwich Victoria (9)	2–3	West Didsbury & Chorlton (9)	375
69	Stansted (9)	1–1	Buckhurst Hill (9)	463
84	Aylesbury United (8)	1–0	Ardley United (9)	161
107	Southall (8)	0–1	Peacehaven & Telscombe (9)	115
129	Sholing (8)	2–1	AFC Portchester (9)	394
Saturday 20 August 2022
1	Stockton Town (8)	2–3	Pontefract Collieries (8)	482
2	Tow Law Town (9)	1–2	Ashington (9)	185
3	West Allotment Celtic (9)	0–7	Workington (8)	150
4	Newcastle Benfield (9)	1–1	Shildon (8)	
5	Carlisle City (9)	2–3	Goole (9)	175
6	Bishop Auckland (9)	5–2	Kendal Town (9)	274
7	North Shields (8)	2–0	Seaham Red Star (9)	304
8	Bridlington Town (8)	0–3	Dunston (8)	282
9	Heaton Stannington (9)	4–1	North Ferriby (9)	508
11	Avro (9)	0–0	Albion Sports (9)	134
13	Ramsbottom United (8)	0–0	City of Liverpool (8)	328
14	Mossley (8)	2–4	Macclesfield (8)	834
15	Trafford (8)	1–2	Runcorn Linnets (8)	581
16	Congleton Town (9)	0–0	Bootle (8)	312
17	Clitheroe (8)	2–0	Colne (8)	604
18	Sheffield (8)	0–1	Glossop North End (8)	295
19	Silsden (9)	1–5	Charnock Richard (9)	163
20	Brighouse Town (8)	1–2	Penistone Church (9)	225
21	Ossett United (8)	1–2	Whitchurch Alport (9)	342
22	Skelmersdale United (8)	1–3	Prescot Cables (8)	263
24	Prestwich Heys (9)	2–2	Stocksbridge Park Steels (8)	258
25	Market Drayton Town (9)	1–2	Highgate United (9)	
26	Hanley Town (8)	1–0	Hinckley LR (8)	105
27	Lye Town (9)	1–1	Kidsgrove Athletic (8)	118
28	Leek Town (8)	1–5	Atherstone Town (9)	355
29	Romulus (9)	3–0	Halesowen Town (8)	
30	Coleshill Town (8)	1–2	Chasetown (8)	128
31	Witton Albion (8)	4–1	Tividale (9)	303
32	Lichfield City (9)	2–0	Bugbrooke St Michaels (9)	171
33	Malvern Town (9)	3–3	Worcester Raiders (9)	757
34	Sporting Khalsa (8)	0–1	Boldmere St. Michaels (8)	137
35	Newcastle Town (8)	1–1	Bedworth United (8)	126
36	Wolverhampton Casuals (9)	3–3	Stone Old Alleynians (9)	
37	Stourport Swifts (9)	1–0	Racing Club Warwick (9)	203
38	Studley (9)	1–2	Rugby Town (9)	134
39	Carlton Town (8)	0–1	Loughborough Students (9)	102
40	Long Eaton United (8)	4–1	Quorn (9)	291
41	AFC Mansfield (9)	0–3	Worksop Town (8)	235
42	Spalding United (8)	0–1	Stamford (8)	468
43	Anstey Nomads (9)	5–2	Skegness Town (9)	
44	Harborough Town (8)	6–1	Bottesford Town (9)	174
45	Kimberley Miners Welfare (9)	2–0	Leicester Nirvana (9)	128
46	Lincoln United (8)	0–0	Grantham Town (8)	301
47	Cleethorpes Town (8)	1–1	Handsworth (9)	184
48	Shepshed Dynamo (8)	3–2	Pinchbeck United (9)	165
49	Ipswich Wanderers (9)	3–0	Gorleston (8)	117
50	Bury Town (8)	3–0	Newmarket Town (9)	415
52	Kempston Rovers (8)	2–0	Wisbech Town (9)	117
53	St Neots Town (8)	3–0	Godmanchester Rovers (9)	273
54	Mildenhall Town (9)	2–1	Histon (9)	220
55	Soham Town Rangers (9)	1–1	Potton United (9)	157
56	Fakenham Town (9)	0–0	Sheringham (9)	216
57	AFC Sudbury (8)	1–1	Stowmarket Town (8)	427
58	Dereham Town (8)	2–0	Felixstowe & Walton United (8)	229
60	Biggleswade Town (8)	4–1	Whitton United (9)	
61	Waltham Abbey (8)	3–0	Tilbury (8)	148
63	Brentwood Town (8)	1–1	Harlow Town (8)	273
64	Barton Rovers (8)	0–3	Hashtag United (8)	201
66	Maldon & Tiptree (8)	2–0	Harpenden Town (9)	179
67	Leverstock Green (9)	2–2	St. Panteleimon (9)	
70	AFC Dunstable (8)	2–2	Edgware & Kingsbury (9)	
71	Southend Manor (9)	1–1	Shefford Town & Campton (9)	
72	Berkhamsted (8)	1–0	Ware (8)	205
73	FC Clacton (9)	0–1	East Thurrock United (8)	245
74	Welwyn Garden City (8)	1–2	Hertford Town (8)	286
75	Ilford (9)	0–3	Enfield (9)	
76	Stotfold (9)	2–2	Grays Athletic (8)	329
77	Brantham Athletic (9)	0–1	Witham Town (8)	67
78	Barking (9)	0–0	Leighton Town (9)	
79	Bishop's Cleeve (8)	2–0	Brimscombe & Thrupp (9)	154
80	Cinderford Town (8)	0–0	Chipping Sodbury Town (9)	110
81	Kidlington (8)	0–3	Binfield (8)	126
82	Flackwell Heath (9)	0–1	Slimbridge (8)	232
83	Holyport (9)	2–1	Ascot United (9)	
85	Easington Sports (9)	0–0	Roman Glass St George (9)	
86	Royal Wootton Bassett Town (9)	3–1	Reading City (9)	
87	Marlow (8)	3–1	Thame United (8)	338
88	Aylesbury Vale Dynamos (9)	3–1	Bristol Manor Farm (8)	
89	Cirencester Town (8)	1–1	Clevedon Town (9)	141
90	Didcot Town (8)	4–0	Cadbury Heath (9)	179
91	Beckenham Town (8)	3–2	K Sports (9)	83
92	Walton & Hersham (8)	3–2	Littlehampton Town (8)	367
93	Burgess Hill Town (8)	3–1	Stansfeld (9)	231
94	North Greenford United (9)	2–1	Sheerwater (9)	
95	Sheppey United (8)	0–0	Newhaven (9)	

Tie	Home team (Tier)	Score	Away team (Tier)	Att.
96	Colliers Wood United (9)	0–2	Chatham Town (8)	119
97	Hassocks (9)	1–3	Uxbridge (8)	148
98	Fisher (9)	2–2	Sittingbourne (8)	247
99	Midhurst & Easebourne (9)	2–1	Harefield United (9)	
100	Crawley Down Gatwick (9)	2–3	Spelthorne Sports (9)	
101	Leatherhead (8)	3–0	Haywards Heath Town (8)	281
102	Corinthian (8)	3–0	Guildford City (9)	91
103	Virginia Water (9)	1–1	Eastbourne Town (9)	
104	Punjab United (9)	1–2	Westfield (8)	68
105	Ashford Town (Middlesex) (8)	2–2	Northwood (8)	136
106	Merstham (8)	1–1	Sevenoaks Town (8)	189
108	Three Bridges (8)	3–2	Deal Town (9)	116
109	Chichester City (8)	2–0	Knaphill (9)	192
110	Sutton Athletic (9)	1–2	Ashford United (8)	131
111	Erith Town (9)	2–1	Bedfont Sports (8)	
112	Tunbridge Wells (9)	0–1	Phoenix Sports (9)	
113	Lancing (8)	1–4	East Grinstead Town (8)	147
114	Raynes Park Vale (9)	2–2	Hythe Town (8)	208
115	Glebe (9)	0–3	Cray Valley Paper Mills (8)	146
116	Hanworth Villa (8)	2–1	Chertsey Town (8)	242
117	Rusthall (9)	2–1	Ramsgate (8)	276
118	Tooting & Mitcham United (8)	1–2	VCD Athletic (8)	254
119	Blackfield & Langley (9)	2–1	Fareham Town (9)	
120	Cowes Sports (9)	1–1	Larkhall Athletic (8)	
121	Moneyfields (9)	1–3	Wimborne Town (8)	
122	Laverstock & Ford (9)	2–0	United Services Portsmouth (9)	
123	Baffins Milton Rovers (9)	3–0	Horndean (9)	
124	Hamworthy United (8)	3–2	Badshot Lea (9)	120
125	Camberley Town (9)	1–1	Wincanton Town (10)	
126	Westbury United (8)	5–1	Andover New Street (10)	
127	AFC Totton (8)	3–0	Melksham Town (8)	258
128	Lymington Town (8)	0–6	Basingstoke Town (8)	161
130	AFC Stoneham (9)	2–0	Newport (IOW) (10)	
131	Helston Athletic (9)	2–1	Falmouth Town (9)	
132	Willand Rovers (8)	2–1	Ilfracombe Town (9)	137
133	Shepton Mallet (9)	4–0	Brixham (10)	243
134	Paulton Rovers (8)	5–2	Bideford (8)	157
135	Torpoint Athletic (9)	3–2	Mousehole (9)	
136	Buckland Athletic (9)	0–3	Frome Town (8)	166
Sunday 21 August 2022
10	Whickham (9)	4–0	Sunderland RCA (9)	
12	Bury AFC (9)	2–0	Widnes (8)	832
51	Biggleswade (8)	3–2	Cambridge City (8)	280
62	FC Romania (8)	0–2	Heybridge Swifts (8)	78
65	Romford (9)	1–1	Takeley (9)	136
68	Dunstable Town (9)	2–1	West Essex (9)	
Tuesday 30 August 2022
59	Lowestoft Town (8)	3–0	Haverhill Rovers (9)	
Replays
Tuesday 23 August 2022
4R	Shildon (8)	4–2	Newcastle Benfield (9)	202
16R	Bootle (8)	1–4	Congleton Town (9)	318
24R	Stocksbridge Park Steels (8)	2–1 (a.e.t.)	Prestwich Heys (9)	146
27R	Kidsgrove Athletic (8)	1–2 (a.e.t.)	Lye Town (9)	
35R	Bedworth United (8)	0–1	Newcastle Town (8)	187
36R	Stone Old Alleynians (9)	2–1	Wolverhampton Casuals (9)	121
46R	Grantham Town (8)	5–1	Lincoln United (8)	334
55R	Potton United (9)	3–1	Soham Town Rangers (9)	152
56R	Sheringham (9)	3–0	Fakenham Town (9)	
57R	Stowmarket Town (8)	2–3 (a.e.t.)	AFC Sudbury (8)	
63R	Harlow Town (8)	1–1 (4–2 p)	Brentwood Town (8)	289
69R	Buckhurst Hill (9)	3–0	Stansted (9)	287
70R	Edgware & Kingsbury (9)	1–0 (a.e.t.)	AFC Dunstable (8)	80
71R	Shefford Town & Campton (9)	3–2	Southend Manor (9)	
78R	Leighton Town (9)	1–1 (3–4 p)	Barking (9)	
80R	Chipping Sodbury Town (9)	0–5	Cinderford Town (8)	158
95R	Newhaven (9)	1–2	Sheppey United (8)	
98R	Sittingbourne (8)	0–1	Fisher (9)	
103R	Eastbourne Town (9)	2–2 (4–3 p)	Virginia Water (9)	
105R	Northwood (8)	1–3	Ashford Town (Middlesex) (8)	191
114R	Hythe Town (8)	5–4 (a.e.t.)	Raynes Park Vale (9)	
Wednesday 24 August 2022
11R	Albion Sports (9)	0–0 (2–4 p)	Avro (9)	
13R	City of Liverpool (8)	4–3	Ramsbottom United (8)	
33R	Worcester Raiders (9)	4–0	Malvern Town (9)	
47R	Handsworth (9)	1–5	Cleethorpes Town (8)	249
65R	Takeley (9)	2–3	Romford (9)	196
67R	St. Panteleimon (9)	3–3 (2–4 p)	Leverstock Green (9)	
76R	Grays Athletic (8)	3–2	Stotfold (9)	
85R	Roman Glass St George (9)	3–2	Easington Sports (9)	
89R	Clevedon Town (9)	1–2	Cirencester Town (8)	154
106R	Sevenoaks Town (8)	2–0	Merstham (8)	391
120R	Larkhall Athletic (8)	4–2	Cowes Sports (9)	
125R	Wincanton Town (10)	3–0	Camberley Town (9)	
Match played at Sherborne Town.

=== Review ===
136 fixtures plus replays took place. After taking nine attempts to win their first FA Cup game in the previous round, Holyport won their second at the first time of asking. All five debutants that made it through to this round also won again.

== First qualifying round ==
The draw for the first qualifying round was made on 22 August 2022. Teams were drawn into 5 regionalised groups loosely based on the maximum distance travelled. More club dense regions drew bigger pot sizes combining more divisions; two pots contained 50 teams, another two contained 42, and one contained 40.

224 teams made an appearance; 88 newly entered from Level 7 and 136 winners from the previous round. The first of five teams from Wales, Merthyr Town, began at this stage. This round included one club from level 10, Wincanton Town, the lowest ranked team still standing. Five debutants also remained in the competition; Buckhurst Hill, Bury AFC, Midhurst & Easebourne, Shefford Town & Campton, and Worcester Raiders.

Number of non-league teams per tier still in qualifying
National League (Note: National League teams joined in the fourth round of qualifying)	North/South (Note: National League North/South teams joined in the second round of qualifying.)	Premier Division (Note: Premier Division teams joined in the first round of qualifying.)	Division One	Regional	Step 6	Total
24 / 24	48 / 48	88 / 88	64 / 64	53 / 204	1 / 4	378 / 432

Tie	Home team (Tier) (Note: (10) represents teams allocated to divisions at the 10th tier of English football (otherwise known as Step 6 of the National League System). (9) represents the 9th tier (Step 5 NLS). (8) represents the 8th tier (Step 4 NLS). (7) represents the 7th tier (Step 3 NLS).)	Score	Away team (Tier)	Att.
Friday 2 September 2022
27	Stourbridge (7)	2–2	Hanley Town (8)	547
70	Three Bridges (8)	2–1	Erith Town (9)	295
89	Aylesbury United (8)	0–1	Margate (7)	273
93	Baffins Milton Rovers (9)	1–5	Winchester City (7)	332
Saturday 3 September 2022
1	Morpeth Town (7)	2–2	Warrington Town (7)	339
2	Warrington Rylands 1906 (7)	0–4	Hyde United (7)	282
3	Stalybridge Celtic (7)	0–0	Lancaster City (7)	349
4	Shildon (8)	2–1	Penistone Church (9)	202
5	Ashton United (7)	0–0	Ashington (9)	243
6	South Shields (7)	3–2	Workington (8)	914
7	Bury AFC (9)	2–1	North Shields (8)	936
8	Witton Albion (8)	0–1	FC United of Manchester (7)	714
9	Clitheroe (8)	1–1	Heaton Stannington (9)	518
10	Charnock Richard (9)	2–2	Pontefract Collieries (8)	170
11	Guiseley (7)	2–1	Avro (9)	362
12	West Didsbury & Chorlton (9)	0–1	Macclesfield (8)	1,340
13	Nantwich Town (7)	0–2	Congleton Town (9)	329
14	Goole (9)	0–1	Prescot Cables (8)	350
15	Marske United (7)	2–1	Runcorn Linnets (8)	435
16	Bamber Bridge (7)	1–0	Whickham (9)	175
17	Whitby Town (7)	5–0	Bishop Auckland (9)	485
18	Dunston (8)	3–0	City of Liverpool (8)	204
19	Liversedge (7)	2–1	Glossop North End (8)	338
20	Marine (7)	2–1	Radcliffe (7)	865
21	Stocksbridge Park Steels (8)	2–1	Atherton Collieries (7)	171
22	Rushall Olympic (7)	1–4	Redditch United (7)	246
23	Mickleover (7)	2–3	Alvechurch (7)	168
24	Nuneaton Borough (7)	3–1	Belper Town (7)	587
25	Lye Town (9)	1–2	Harborough Town (8)	195
26	Barwell (7)	1–1	Highgate United (9)	213
28	Stone Old Alleynians (9)	0–1	Chasetown (8)	184
29	Shepshed Dynamo (8)	1–1	Coalville Town (7)	777
30	Worksop Town (8)	5–0	Worcester Raiders (9)	362
31	Anstey Nomads (9)	3–1	Whitchurch Alport (9)	254
32	Stafford Rangers (7)	0–2	Newcastle Town (8)	549
33	Grantham Town (8)	3–3	Rugby Town (9)	281
Match played at Rugby Town.
34	Hednesford Town (7)	1–3	Long Eaton United (8)	402
35	Atherstone Town (9)	3–1	Kimberley Miners Welfare (9)	374
36	Gainsborough Trinity (7)	3–1	Loughborough Students (9)	427
37	Tamworth (7)	6–0	Boldmere St. Michaels (8)	444
38	Basford United (7)	5–0	Romulus (9)	207
39	Lichfield City (9)	2–2	Stourport Swifts (9)	162
40	Bromsgrove Sporting (7)	4–3	Stamford (8)	518
41	Matlock Town (7)	0–2	Ilkeston Town (7)	695
42	Cleethorpes Town (8)	0–4	Stratford Town (7)	243
43	Romford (9)	3–2	Hashtag United (8)	167
44	St Ives Town (7)	4–0	Barking (9)	201
45	Dunstable Town (9)	0–2	Shefford Town & Campton (9)	297
46	Potton United (9)	1–5	Hendon (7)	216
47	Waltham Abbey (8)	7–2	Buckhurst Hill (9)	301
48	Berkhamsted (8)	2–1	Witham Town (8)	229
49	Hitchin Town (7)	0–3	Heybridge Swifts (8)	424
50	Hertford Town (8)	0–3	Royston Town (7)	337
51	Brightlingsea Regent (7)	3–0	Mildenhall Town (9)	211
53	Harlow Town (8)	0–2	Kings Langley (7)	254
54	Aveley (7)	A–A	Potters Bar Town (7)	
Match abandoned in the 91st minute with the score at 1–1. Aveley "decided to travel [away]...for the replay".
55	Kempston Rovers (8)	1–2	Bedford Town (7)	511
56	Bishop's Stortford (7)	1–2	St Neots Town (8)	431
57	Canvey Island (7)	5–1	Enfield Town (7)	346
58	Needham Market (7)	3–1	Leiston (7)	271
59	Dereham Town (8)	0–1	Biggleswade Town (8)	217
60	Maldon & Tiptree (8)	2–1	Haringey Borough (7)	209
61	Wingate & Finchley (7)	1–0	Bowers & Pitsea (7)	142
62	Lowestoft Town (8)	0–1	Sheringham (9)	444
63	Edgware & Kingsbury (9)	1–4	Grays Athletic (8)	118
64	Ipswich Wanderers (9)	1–3	Hornchurch (7)	156
65	Billericay Town (7)	4–1	Leverstock Green (9)	378
66	Bury Town (8)	0–3	AFC Sudbury (8)	716
67	East Thurrock United (8)	2–1	Biggleswade (8)	175
68	Ashford Town (Middlesex) (8)	2–4	Westfield (8)	148

Tie	Home team (Tier)	Score	Away team (Tier)	Att.
69	Carshalton Athletic (7)	5–1	VCD Athletic (8)	245
71	Sheppey United (8)	2–2	Lewes (7)	267
72	Leatherhead (8)	1–2	Chichester City (8)	322
73	Phoenix Sports (9)	4–1	Rusthall (9)	158
74	Metropolitan Police (7)	2–2	Corinthian (8)	150
75	Hythe Town (8)	0–2	Hayes & Yeading United (7)	227
76	Folkestone Invicta (7)	3–1	North Greenford United (9)	478
77	Cray Valley Paper Mills (8)	3–0	Hastings United (7)	162
78	Eastbourne Town (9)	0–2	Hanwell Town (7)	285
79	Bracknell Town (7)	4–1	Harrow Borough (7)	133
80	Walton & Hersham (8)	2–2	Beaconsfield Town (7)	388
81	Corinthian-Casuals (7)	1–2	Burgess Hill Town (8)	251
82	Herne Bay (7)	2–1	Horsham (7)	188
84	Fisher (9)	1–1	Spelthorne Sports (9)	169
85	Sevenoaks Town (8)	2–1	Kingstonian (7)	294
86	Bognor Regis Town (7)	2–2	Cray Wanderers (7)	351
87	Midhurst & Easebourne (9)	0–6	Chatham Town (8)	212
88	Ashford United (8)	2–1	Hanworth Villa (8)	260
90	Chesham United (7)	5–2	Peacehaven & Telscombe (9)	251
91	Marlow (8)	0–1	Uxbridge (8)	253
92	East Grinstead Town (8)	2–2	Beckenham Town (8)	245
94	Basingstoke Town (8)	2–4	Weston-super-Mare (7)	439
95	Didcot Town (8)	1–1	Plymouth Parkway (7)	288
96	Poole Town (7)	0–2	Salisbury (7)	414
97	Willand Rovers (8)	1–1	Swindon Supermarine (7)	160
98	North Leigh (7)	2–2	AFC Stoneham (9)	124
99	Frome Town (8)	0–1	Tiverton Town (7)	319
100	Cinderford Town (8)	2–3	Laverstock & Ford (9)	178
101	Larkhall Athletic (8)	0–2	Cirencester Town (8)	180
102	Blackfield & Langley (9)	0–0	Shepton Mallet (9)	120
103	Roman Glass St George (9)	0–4	Hartley Wintney (7)	60
104	Torpoint Athletic (9)	1–2	Helston Athletic (9)	191
105	Bishop's Cleeve (8)	3–1	Westbury United (8)	152
106	Yate Town (7)	4–3	Aylesbury Vale Dynamos (9)	191
107	Royal Wootton Bassett Town (9)	2–4	Paulton Rovers (8)	195
108	Slimbridge (8)	0–0	Sholing (8)	96
109	Wincanton Town (10)	2–9	AFC Totton (8)	266
Match played at AFC Totton.
110	Hamworthy United (8)	0–0	Gosport Borough (7)	185
111	Merthyr Town (7)	5–2	Truro City (7)	339
112	Wimborne Town (8)	0–0	Dorchester Town (7)	462
Sunday 4 September 2022
52	Enfield (9)	2–1	AFC Rushden & Diamonds (7)	276
83	Holyport (9)	0–1	Binfield (8)	326
Replays
Monday 5 September 2022
80R	Beaconsfield Town (7)	0–1 (a.e.t.)	Walton & Hersham (8)	232
Tuesday 6 September 2022
1R	Warrington Town (7)	2–1	Morpeth Town (7)	445
3R	Lancaster City (7)	1–0 (a.e.t)	Stalybridge Celtic (7)	193
5R	Ashington (9)	3–0	Ashton United (7)	671
10R	Pontefract Collieries (8)	2–1	Charnock Richard (9)	353
26R	Highgate United (9)	0–3	Barwell (7)	116
27R	Hanley Town (8)	2–1	Stourbridge (7)	221
29R	Coalville Town (7)	2–0	Shepshed Dynamo (8)	810
33R	Rugby Town (9)	1–0 (a.e.t)	Grantham Town (8)	298
39R	Stourport Swifts (9)	0–1	Lichfield City (9)	202
54R	Potters Bar Town (7)	2–1	Aveley (7)	176
71R	Lewes (7)	8–0	Sheppey United (8)	425
74R	Corinthian (8)	1–2 (a.e.t)	Metropolitan Police (7)	140
84R	Spelthorne Sports (9)	0–4	Fisher (9)	163
92R	Beckenham Town (8)	3–1	East Grinstead Town (8)	198
95R	Plymouth Parkway (7)	3–2	Didcot Town (8)	301
98R	AFC Stoneham (9)	1–3	North Leigh (7)	132
102R	Shepton Mallet (9)	3–2	Blackfield & Langley (9)	323
108R	Sholing (8)	5–2 (a.e.t)	Slimbridge (8)	176
112R	Dorchester Town (7)	1–0	Wimborne Town (8)	426
Wednesday 7 September 2022
9R	Heaton Stannington (9)	1–2	Clitheroe (8)	883
86R	Cray Wanderers (7)	0–4	Bognor Regis Town (7)	145
97R	Swindon Supermarine (7)	1–0	Willand Rovers (8)	162
110R	Gosport Borough (7)	4–0	Hamworthy United (8)	319

=== Review ===
112 fixtures plus replays took place. Amongst the action, Bury AFC continued their debut FA Cup run with a 2–1 win over North Shields, live on BBC Sport; The lowest ranked and last remaining Level 10 team, Wincanton Town, saw their run end in a 9–2 defeat to AFC Totton; Blackfield & Langley goalkeeper, Connor Maseko, made national headlines by getting sent off for "urinating in a hedge"; Yan Osadchyi, a Ukrainian refugee who before the Russian invasion of his country played for second-tier club FC Alliance Lypova Dolyna, featured for Redditch United in their 4–1 away win at Rushall Olympic.

==== Upsets ====
Giantkiller (tier)	Opponent (tier)
Upset of two leagues above
Ashington (level 9)	3–0 at home (replay) vs Ashton United (level 7)
Congleton Town (level 9)	2–0 away vs Nantwich Town (level 7)
Enfield (level 9)	2–1 at home vs AFC Rushden & Diamonds (level 7)

== Second qualifying round ==
The draw for the second qualifying round was made on 5 September 2022.

160 teams made an appearance; 48 newly entered from Level 6 (National League North and South) and 112 winners from the previous round. This round included 16 clubs from Level 9, the lowest ranked teams still standing in the competition. Two debutants also remained in the competition, Bury AFC and Shefford Town & Campton.

Tie	Home team (Tier) (Note: (9) represents teams allocated to divisions at the 9th tier of English football (otherwise known as Step 5 of the National League System). (8) represents the 8th tier (Step 4 NLS). (7) represents the 7th tier (Step 3 NLS). (6) represents the 6th tier (Step 2).)	Score	Away team (Tier)	Att.
Friday 16 September 2022
49	Chesham United (7)	2–2	Bracknell Town (7)	369
Saturday 17 September 2022
1	Prescot Cables (8)	1–2	Bamber Bridge (7)	702
2	Liversedge (7)	1–1	Chorley (6)	364
3	Shildon (8)	0–5	South Shields (7)	501
4	Stocksbridge Park Steels (8)	2–1	Marine (7)	254
5	Lancaster City (7)	1–1	Bury AFC (9)	591
6	Chester (6)	2–0	Pontefract Collieries (8)	1,502
7	Scarborough Athletic (6)	3–2	Dunston (8)	1,102
8	Ashington (9)	2–1	Bradford (Park Avenue) (6)	711
9	AFC Fylde (6)	1–1	Farsley Celtic (6)	400
10	Clitheroe (8)	2–0	Spennymoor Town (6)	638
11	Whitby Town (7)	0–1	Marske United (7)	769
12	Blyth Spartans (6)	2–0	Guiseley (7)	584
13	Darlington (6)	3–2	Southport (6)	1,088
14	FC United of Manchester (7)	2–3	Curzon Ashton (6)	1,296
15	Hyde United (7)	1–0	Warrington Town (7)	511
16	AFC Telford United (6)	2–4	Chasetown (8)	613
17	Long Eaton United (8)	1–1	Gainsborough Trinity (7)	414
18	Leamington (6)	0–1	Nuneaton Borough (7)	698
19	Lichfield City (9)	0–4	Boston United (6)	704
20	Alvechurch (7)	4–0	Harborough Town (8)	177
22	Basford United (7)	2–0	Rugby Town (9)	303
23	Brackley Town (6)	0–2	Worksop Town (8)	440
24	Coalville Town (7)	1–0	Macclesfield (8)	1,070
25	Hereford (6)	1–0	Bromsgrove Sporting (7)	1,425
26	Redditch United (7)	2–2	Peterborough Sports (6)	421
27	Barwell (7)	1–4	Kettering Town (6)	402
28	Buxton (6)	2–1	Alfreton Town (6)	695
29	Newcastle Town (8)	1–1	Congleton Town (9)	202
30	Anstey Nomads (9)	1–1	Ilkeston Town (7)	602
31	Hanley Town (8)	4–1	Atherstone Town (9)	267
32	Kidderminster Harriers (6)	1–0	Tamworth (7)	1,663
33	East Thurrock United (8)	0–3	Biggleswade Town (8)	235
34	St Albans City (6)	1–1	AFC Sudbury (8)	691
35	Maldon & Tiptree (8)	0–3	Hornchurch (7)	327
36	Canvey Island (7)	0–3	St Ives Town (7)	382
37	Berkhamsted (8)	2–0	Concord Rangers (6)	281
38	Chelmsford City (6)	6–1	Kings Langley (7)	596
39	Cheshunt (6)	3–1	St Neots Town (8)	356
40	Heybridge Swifts (8)	1–1	Braintree Town (6)	617
41	Hemel Hempstead Town (6)	3–0	Royston Town (7)	456
42	Potters Bar Town (7)	1–2	Romford (9)	204
43	Hendon (7)	3–1	Wingate & Finchley (7)	200
44	Needham Market (7)	2–0	Sheringham (9)	176
45	King's Lynn Town (6)	1–1	Bedford Town (7)	1,009
46	Waltham Abbey (8)	2–3	Brightlingsea Regent (7)	196
47	Enfield (9)	0–4	Billericay Town (7)	271
48	Grays Athletic (8)	1–3	Shefford Town & Campton (9)	220
50	Dartford (6)	1–2	Beckenham Town (8)	674
51	Farnborough (6)	1–1	Hayes & Yeading United (7)	425
52	Dulwich Hamlet (6)	2–1	Margate (7)	1,725

Tie	Home team (Tier)	Score	Away team (Tier)	Att.
53	Welling United (6)	0–0	Fisher (9)	694
55	Westfield (8)	1–2	Carshalton Athletic (7)	202
56	Ebbsfleet United (6)	2–0	Dover Athletic (6)	1,057
57	Cray Valley Paper Mills (8)	1–2	Hanwell Town (7)	144
58	Lewes (7)	1–1	Three Bridges (8)	1,178
59	Walton & Hersham (8)	2–2	Chatham Town (8)	1,020
60	Eastbourne Borough (6)	2–0	Uxbridge (8)	574
61	Folkestone Invicta (7)	3–0	Chichester City (8)	522
62	Binfield (8)	4–0	Tonbridge Angels (6)	389
63	Metropolitan Police (7)	3–1	Burgess Hill Town (8)	175
64	Slough Town (6)	1–3	Worthing (6)	474
65	Phoenix Sports (9)	0–1	Sevenoaks Town (8)	152
66	Bognor Regis Town (7)	0–2	Hampton & Richmond Borough (6)	502
67	Weston-super-Mare (7)	1–0	Shepton Mallet (9)	644
68	Havant & Waterlooville (6)	1–0	AFC Totton (8)	455
69	Gosport Borough (7)	1–1	Paulton Rovers (8)	416
70	Taunton Town (6)	1–0	Laverstock & Ford (9)	645
71	Merthyr Town (7)	1–1	Cirencester Town (8)	424
72	Bath City (6)	2–2	Hartley Wintney (7)	857
73	Yate Town (7)	2–1	Tiverton Town (7)	244
74	Winchester City (7)	1–3	Weymouth (6)	502
75	Swindon Supermarine (7)	1–0	Dorchester Town (7)	302
76	Bishop's Cleeve (8)	3–3	Helston Athletic (9)	174
77	Hungerford Town (6)	1–3	Gloucester City (6)	433
78	North Leigh (7)	2–3	Plymouth Parkway (7)	170
79	Chippenham Town (6)	3–0	Sholing (8)	296
80	Salisbury (7)	1–2	Oxford City (6)	451
Sunday 18 September 2022
54	Herne Bay (7)	2–0	Ashford United (8)	270
Tuesday 20 September 2022
21	Stratford Town (7)	0–1	Banbury United (6)	640
Replays
Tuesday 20 September 2022
2R	Chorley (6)	9–0	Liversedge (7)	428
9R	Farsley Celtic (6)	0–3	AFC Fylde (6)	
17R	Gainsborough Trinity (7)	4–2 (a.e.t)	Long Eaton United (8)	372
26R	Peterborough Sports (6)	1–0	Redditch United (7)	372
29R	Congleton Town (9)	3–2	Newcastle Town (8)	563
30R	Ilkeston Town (7)	3–3 (4–5 p)	Anstey Nomads (9)	561
34R	AFC Sudbury (8)	2–1	St Albans City (6)	391
40R	Braintree Town (6)	2–1	Heybridge Swifts (8)	411
45R	Bedford Town (7)	0–3	King's Lynn Town (6)	517
49R	Bracknell Town (7)	3–0	Chesham United (7)	229
51R	Hayes & Yeading United (7)	0–2	Farnborough (6)	304
53R	Fisher (9)	0–3	Welling United (6)	573
58R	Three Bridges (8)	4–0	Lewes (7)	374
59R	Chatham Town (8)	1–3	Walton & Hersham (8)	911
71R	Cirencester Town (8)	1–2	Merthyr Town (7)	190
72R	Hartley Wintney (7)	0–1 (a.e.t.)	Bath City (6)	380
76R	Helston Athletic (9)	4–3	Bishop's Cleeve (8)	351
Wednesday 21 September 2022
5R	Bury AFC (9)	5–3	Lancaster City (7)	886
69R	Paulton Rovers (8)	2–1	Gosport Borough (7)	214

=== Review ===
A "rather surprising" number of cup shock occurred across this round.

==== Upsets ====
Giantkiller (tier)	Opponent (tier)
Upset of three leagues above
Ashington (level 9)	2–1 at home vs Bradford Park Avenue (level 6)
Upset of two leagues above
AFC Sudbury (level 8)	2–1 at home (replay) vs St Albans City (level 6)
Anstey Nomads (level 9)	3–3 (p) away (replay) vs Ilkeston Town (level 7)
Beckenham Town (level 8)	2–1 away vs Dartford (level 6)
Binfield (level 8)	4–0 at home vs Tonbridge Angels (level 6)
Bury AFC (level 9)	5–3 at home (replay) vs Lancaster City (level 7)
Chasetown (level 8)	4–2 away vs AFC Telford United (level 6)
Clitheroe (level 8)	2–0 at home vs Spennymoor Town (level 6)
Romford (level 9)	2–1 away vs Potters Bar Town (level 7)
Worksop Town (level 8)	2–0 away vs Brackley Town (level 6)

== Third qualifying round ==
The draw for the third qualifying round was made on 20 September 2022.

80 winners from the previous round made an appearance, including seven teams from the 9th tier of English football, the lowest ranked teams still left in the competition. Two debutants also remained in the competition, Bury AFC and Shefford Town & Campton.

Tie	Home team (Tier) (Note: (9) represents teams allocated to divisions at the 9th tier of English football (otherwise known as Step 5 of the National League System). (8) represents the 8th tier (Step 4 NLS). (7) represents the 7th tier (Step 3 NLS). (6) represents the 6th tier (Step 2).)	Score	Away team (Tier)	Att.
Friday 30 September 2022
18	Needham Market (7)	2–0	Brightlingsea Regent (7)	308
Saturday 1 October 2022
1	Gainsborough Trinity (7)	0–1	Worksop Town (8)	1,012
2	Bamber Bridge (7)	0–3	Buxton (6)	432
3	South Shields (7)	5–2	Marske United (7)	1,218
4	Hyde United (7)	1–0	Darlington (6)	870
5	Chester (6)	0–0	Hanley Town (8)	1,704
6	Scarborough Athletic (6)	2–2	Curzon Ashton (6)	1,141
7	Chorley (6)	0–1	Blyth Spartans (6)	694
8	Congleton Town (9)	1–1	AFC Fylde (6)	1,139
9	Stocksbridge Park Steels (8)	2–2	Ashington (9)	429
10	Clitheroe (8)	1–1	Bury AFC (9)	1,756
11	Peterborough Sports (6)	3–1	Hemel Hempstead Town (6)	320
12	Cheshunt (6)	1–2	Kidderminster Harriers (6)	483
13	Hornchurch (7)	3–0	Braintree Town (6)	635
14	Coalville Town (7)	3–0	AFC Sudbury (8)	1,209
15	Billericay Town (7)	3–3	Biggleswade Town (8)	638
16	Alvechurch (7)	4–0	Nuneaton Borough (7)	448
17	King's Lynn Town (6)	6–1	Kettering Town (6)	828
19	Romford (9)	0–5	Chelmsford City (6)	336
20	Basford United (7)	1–1	Boston United (6)	764
21	Anstey Nomads (9)	5–0	Shefford Town & Campton (9)	735
22	Banbury United (6)	2–0	Berkhamsted (8)	782
23	St Ives Town (7)	3–1	Chasetown (8)	416
24	Taunton Town (6)	1–0	Walton & Hersham (8)	731
25	Dulwich Hamlet (6)	0–1	Folkestone Invicta (7)	1,863
26	Hendon (7)	3–2	Herne Bay (7)	234

Tie	Home team (Tier)	Score	Away team (Tier)	Att.
27	Weston-super-Mare (7)	7–2	Helston Athletic (9)	595
28	Carshalton Athletic (7)	0–2	Havant & Waterlooville (6)	444
29	Metropolitan Police (7)	1–2	Chippenham Town (6)	206
30	Hampton & Richmond Borough (6)	6–1	Paulton Rovers (8)	461
31	Weymouth (6)	3–0	Welling United (6)	548
32	Oxford City (6)	1–1	Plymouth Parkway (7)	276
33	Gloucester City (6)	0–1	Merthyr Town (7)	937
34	Worthing (6)	1–2	Eastbourne Borough (6)	1,426
35	Three Bridges (8)	0–3	Hereford (6)	746
36	Bath City (6)	0–1	Sevenoaks Town (8)	1,004
37	Beckenham Town (8)	5–3	Binfield (8)	275
38	Yate Town (7)	0–3	Bracknell Town (7)	213
39	Swindon Supermarine (7)	1–5	Farnborough (6)	282
40	Hanwell Town (7)	1–2	Ebbsfleet United (6)	544
Replays
Tuesday 4 October 2022
5R	Hanley Town (8)	0–4	Chester (6)	946
6R	Curzon Ashton (6)	3–2 (a.e.t.)	Scarborough Athletic (6)	229
8R	AFC Fylde (6)	5–1	Congleton Town (9)	526
9R	Ashington (9)	3–0	Stocksbridge Park Steels (8)	1,424
15R	Biggleswade Town (8)	3–0	Billericay Town (7)	231
20R	Boston United (6)	3–3 (2–4 p)	Basford United (7)	1,196
32R	Plymouth Parkway (7)	1–3 (a.e.t.)	Oxford City (6)	319
Wednesday 5 October 2022
10R	Bury AFC (9)	2–0	Clitheroe (8)	1,147

=== Upsets ===
Giantkiller (tier)	Opponent (tier)
Upset of two leagues above
Sevenoaks Town (level 8)	1–0 away vs Bath City (level 6)

== Fourth qualifying round ==
The draw was made on 2 October 2022. Teams were drawn from two regionalised pots, with 14 fixtures in the northern section and 18 in the southern section.

64 teams made an appearance, 24 newly entering teams from Level 5 and 40 winners from the previous round. Three teams from the 9th tier of English football, the lowest ranked teams still left in the competition, competed in this round, including Bury AFC, the lone debutant remaining in the competition, but all three were knocked out.

Tie	Home team (Tier) (Note: (9) represents teams allocated to divisions at the 9th tier of English football (otherwise known as Step 5 of the National League System). (8) represents the 8th tier (Step 4 NLS). (7) represents the 7th tier (Step 3 NLS). (6) represents the 6th tier (Step 2). (5) represents the 5th tier (Step 1))	Score	Away team (Tier)	Att.
Saturday 15 October 2022
1	Oldham Athletic (5)	1–1	Chester (6)	5,342
2	Kidderminster Harriers (6)	2–2	AFC Fylde (6)	1,558
3	King's Lynn Town (6)	3–1	Ashington (9)	1,709
4	Bury AFC (9)	1–2	York City (5)	2,069
5	South Shields (7)	1–0	Scunthorpe United (5)	2,353
6	Solihull Moors (5)	1–0	Basford United (7)	1,058
7	Peterborough Sports (6)	0–1	Curzon Ashton (6)	513
8	Blyth Spartans (6)	1–1	Wrexham (5)	2,787
9	Altrincham (5)	2–2	Gateshead (5)	1,262
10	Anstey Nomads (9)	0–3	Chesterfield (5)	1,500
11	Alvechurch (7)	3–2	Worksop Town (8)	1,126
12	Buxton (6)	2–1	Hyde United (7)	1,425
13	Notts County (5)	2–3	Coalville Town (7)	5,063
14	St Ives Town (7)	0–3	FC Halifax Town (5)	820
15	Bromley (5)	1–2	Hereford (6)	3,400
16	Torquay United (5)	2–2	Hampton & Richmond Borough (6)	1,264
17	Yeovil Town (5)	0–0	Taunton Town (6)	3,093
18	Maidenhead United (5)	2–1	Eastbourne Borough (6)	759
19	Dorking Wanderers (5)	1–3	Eastleigh (5)	1,007
20	Ebbsfleet United (6)	2–0	Sevenoaks Town (8)	1,304
21	Woking (5)	2–1	Southend United (5)	1,974

Tie	Home team (Tier)	Score	Away team (Tier)	Att.
22	Beckenham Town (8)	0–7	Dagenham & Redbridge (5)	1,661
23	Hendon (7)	2–2	Chippenham Town (6)	435
24	Havant & Waterlooville (6)	1–2	Weymouth (6)	798
25	Hornchurch (7)	1–4	Oxford City (6)	825
26	Bracknell Town (7)	2–1	Banbury United (6)	657
27	Boreham Wood (5)	5–3	Wealdstone (5)	1,011
28	Barnet (5)	3–0	Weston-super-Mare (7)	785
29	Needham Market (7)	1–0	Maidstone United (5)	477
30	Chelmsford City (6)	2–0	Aldershot Town (5)	1,142
31	Merthyr Town (7)	2–1	Folkestone Invicta (7)	1,457
32	Farnborough (6)	7–0	Biggleswade Town (8)	685
Replays
Tuesday 18 October 2022
1R	Chester (6)	2–2 (3–4 p)	Oldham Athletic (5)	3,651
2R	AFC Fylde (6)	2–0	Kidderminster Harriers (6)	495
8R	Wrexham (5)	3–2	Blyth Spartans (6)	6,845
9R	Gateshead (5)	2–1	Altrincham (5)	653
16R	Hampton & Richmond Borough (6)	1–2	Torquay United (5)	1,191
17R	Taunton Town (6)	1–0	Yeovil Town (5)	2,347
23R	Chippenham Town (6)	1–0	Hendon (7)	642

=== Upsets ===
Giantkiller (tier)	Opponent (tier)
Upset of two leagues above
Coalville Town (level 7)	3–2 away vs Notts County (level 5)
South Shields (level 7)	1–0 home vs Scunthorpe United (level 5)
Needham Market (level 7)	1–0 home vs Maidstone United (level 5)

== Broadcasting ==
Round	Tie	Broadcaster
Preliminary round	Marlow v Thame United	BBC Sport
First qualifying round	Bury AFC v North Shields	BBC Sport
Second qualifying round	Walton & Hersham v Chatham Town	BBC Sport
Third qualifying round	Congleton Town v AFC Fylde	BBC Sport
Fourth qualifying round	Anstey Nomads v Chesterfield	BBC Sport
Fourth qualifying round	Blyth Spartans v Wrexham	( (United States) ) ESPN+, ESPN2
Fourth qualifying round	Wrexham v Blyth Spartans (replay)	( (United States) ) ESPN+, ESPN2
