= Tony Pounder =

English footballer

Personal information
- Full name: Anthony Pounder
- Date of birth: 11 March 1966 (age 60)
- Place of birth: Yeovil, England
- Position: Midfielder

Senior career*
Years	Team	Apps	(Gls)
- Westland Sports
1989–1990	Weymouth		
1990–1994	Bristol Rovers	113	(10)
1994	Weymouth		
1994–1996	Hereford United	62	(4)
1996–2000	Yeovil Town		
- Frome Town
- * Club domestic league appearances and goals

Tony Pounder (born 11 March 1966) is a former professional footballer, who played in The Football League for Bristol Rovers and Hereford United.

He started playing for Westland Sports, when he was spotted by Weymouth. He then joined Bristol Rovers, Hereford United and Yeovil Town.
