= Westland Sports F.C. =

Association football club in England

Coordinates: 50°56′26″N 2°40′20″W

Westland Sports
- Full name: Westland Sports Football Club
- Nickname: Sports
- Founded: 1939
- Ground: Alvington Lane, Yeovil
- League: Dorset Premier League
- 2024–25: Dorset Premier League, 8th of 16
Home colours

Westland Sports Football Club is a football club based in Yeovil, Somerset England. They currently play in the Dorset Premier League at their home ground of Alvington Lane. The club is affiliated to the Somerset County FA.

== History ==
The club was founded in 1939, but the second world war prevented regular competitive football. After the war though in 1946, the club was able to field two sides, one Yeovil and District League team, and one youth side. However the club did not achieve any success until the Yeovil League charity cup win in the 1962–63.

In 1964–65 the club withdrew from the Yeovil and District League due to loss of players to Yeovil Town. The situation was short-lived, and the club reformed under the guidance of Dave Topping in the Yeovil League in the 1966–67 season with the intention of entering senior football as soon as possible. This happened the following year when the club was elected to the Somerset Senior League.

In its second year since reformation the club, now fielding a reserve side, had an exceptional year. The Somerset Senior League was won with a record 70 points (2 points for a win), with only one defeat. The Somerset Charity cup was won, and also the Yeovil Hospital cup against Bristol City. Senior league runners up was to follow in the next two seasons.

In 1974 the club, known at that time as Westland-Yeovil, realised their ambition by gaining admittance to the Western Football League on a semi professional basis under the management of Roy Lambden. The club made its debut in the FA trophy competition in the 1975–76 season and three season later in 1978 also made their debut in the FA Vase. After several seasons in the Western league with little success, except for the notable win against Yeovil Town over two legs in the Somerset Professional Cup, mounting financial concerns forced the club to fold once again.

In 1980 the club reformed again in the Yeovil and District League. One season later the club was elected into the Dorset Premier League. In 1987 they made the Somerset Senior cup final, for the first time under the guidance of manager Stuart Housley. Phil Chant took over the management of the club at the start of the 1988–89 season, and four years later saw them win the double, of the Dorset Combination league title and the Dorset Combination cup. This was almost repeated the following season but they finished as runners up in the league whilst lifting the cup again.

In 1999 Pete Watts took over as manager, and the club had to move from its home of Westbourne Grove, as it had been sold for redevelopment. For a couple of seasons, the Club played at Bunford Lane before moving to its present home of Alvington Lane for the 2003–04 campaign. A season after moving to their new home the club won the Somerset Senior Cup for the first time in their history following a 2–1 victory against Hengrove Athletic.

At the start of the 2006–07 season Neil Waddleton and Pete Tutton were appointed as joint managers and they saw the team lift the league title at the end of the season. Three Seasons later with Stuart Smith becoming joint manager with Neil Waddleton the club again won the Somerset Senior Cup. In the 2010–11 season, a new manager, ex Westlands player Kevin Leigh, was appointed with Neil Waddleton staying on as assistant manager.

The following season 2011–12 proved to be a memorable one in the history of the club when they won a 'treble' of Dorset Premier League Championship, Dorset Premier League Cup and Somerset Senior Cup.

== Ground ==
Westland Sports play their games at Alvington, Alvington Lane, Yeovil. They have played there since 2003.

== Honours ==
=== League honours ===
- Dorset Premier League:
  - Winners (3): 1992–93, 2006–07, 2011–12
  - Runners-up (3): 1988–89, 1991–92, 1993–94
- Somerset Senior League:
  - Winners (1): 1968–69

=== Cup honours ===
- Somerset Senior Cup:
  - Winners (3): 2004–05, 2009–10, 2011–12
  - Runners-up (1): 1986–87
- Dorset Premier League Cup :
  - Winners (4): 1983–84, 1992–93, 1993–94, 2011–12
  - Runners-up (1): 1993–94
- Somerset Junior Cup:
  - Winners (2): 1945–46, 1950–51
- Somerset charity cup
  - Winners (1): 1983–84
- Yeovil and District League charity cup
  - Winners (1): 1983–84

== Records ==
- Highest League Position: 8th in Western premier Division 1974–75
- F.A Trophy best Performance: Second qualifying round 1975–76
- F.A. Vase best performance: Third round 1978–79

== Former players ==
A list of players that have played for the club at one stage and meet one of the following criteria;

1. Players that have played/managed in the football league or any foreign equivalent to this level (i.e. fully professional league).
2. Players with full international caps.
- (England) Andy Lindegaard
- (England) Tony Pounder
- (Wales) Ken Wookey
