= Stuart Housley =

English footballer (1948–2021)

Personal information
- Full name: Stuart Housley
- Date of birth: 15 September 1948
- Place of birth: Doncaster, England
- Date of death: 24 August 2021 (aged 72)
- Place of death: Yeovil, England
- Position: Winger

Senior career*
Years	Team	Apps	(Gls)
1966–1969	Grimsby Town	34	(3)
1969–1976	Yeovil Town		
1976–1977	Weymouth	34	
1977–1979	Westland Sports		
1979–1980	Yeovil Town		
- * Club domestic league appearances and goals

Stuart Housley (15 September 1948 – 24 August 2021) was an English professional footballer who played as a winger.

After leaving Grimsby Town, Housley joined Southern League side Yeovil Town for whom he made 399 appearances and scored 60 goals in eight seasons. Housley also spent short spells playing for Weymouth and Westland Sports. He returned to Yeovil in the 1990s under manager Graham Roberts and became the club's youth team manager a role he remained in until 2009. Housley worked with 13 managers at Yeovil, and spent 27 years involved with the club in various roles as a player, youth team coach and manager, kit man and video analyst, finally ending his association with the club in 2015.

Housley died in August 2021, aged 72.
