= Bath and North Somerset District Football League =

- Founded: 1901
- Folded: 2015
- Country: England
- Divisions: 1
- Number of clubs: 11
- Feeder to: Somerset County League
- Promotion to: Somerset County League Division 2
- Last champions: Newbridge (2014–15)
- Website: Bath and District website

The Bath and North Somerset District Football League was a football competition based in England. Its single division was a feeder to the Somerset County Football League and was affiliated to the Somerset County FA.

== History ==
The League was founded as the Bath and District Football League in 1901 when it started with a Saturday Division. It expanded since that time with the first Sunday Division being formed in 1971 and the Indoor Five Aside League starting in 1978.

The league operated a Saturday division until 2015. The Sunday and indoor five-a-side divisions are still operating. The B&NSDFL operated within a 12-mile radius of Bath and whilst the majority of its clubs were based in Bath there were teams from Keynsham and outer suburbs of Bristol as well as some of the smaller outlying villages around Bath.

The league was renamed from the Bath and District Saturday League to the Bath and North Somerset Football League in 2014 before the 2014–15 season.

== Administration ==
The Bath and North Somerset District Football League was constituted with one division on a Saturday, five Divisions on a Sunday and two Divisions in the Indoor Five Aside League, which operates on a Monday evening at King Edward's School Sportshall, Bath. In addition to these competitions there were cup competitions for all sections of the League, the Saturday clubs competed for the Steve Fear Memorial Cup (open to all clubs), and the Bath City KO Cup (also available to all club), the Sunday Clubs still compete for the Stan Milsom Memorial Cup (open to all clubs), the Tom Morgan Memorial Cup (open to Divisions 1, 2 and 3) and the Secretary's Cup (open to Division 4 and 5 clubs). The Indoor League operates a knock out competition that is played in the weeks leading up to Christmas.

The matches in the League are played on a variety of pitches, many clubs use the council owned facilities at Lansdown Playing Fields and Odd Down Playing Fields in Bath, a few clubs play at Bath University and the rest of the clubs use a myriad of smaller pitches with only one or two pitches in and around Bath.

== Final member clubs ==
- Aces
- AFC Brislington
- AFC Brislington Reserves
- Bath Rangers AFC
- Camden Rovers
- Hydez Futebol Clube
- Newbridge
- Old Crown Weston
- Stockwood Wanderers Reserves
- Stothert & Pitt
- Trowbridge House

== Recent divisional champions ==
| Season | Division One | Division Two | Division Three |
|---|---|---|---|
| 2004–05 | Bath University | Odd Down Reserves | Saltford 'A' |
| 2005–06 | Crown Sports | University of Bath Reserves | Bath Arsenal |
| 2006–07 | University of Bath | Civil Service Filos | Civil Service Filos 'A' |
| 2007–08 | University of Bath | Dogtown Odd Down | Moorfields |
| 2008–09 | Chew Valley Seniors | Great Western | WESA Reserves |
| 2009–10 | University of Bath | Bath Arsenal | FC Von Essen |
| 2010–11 | Odd Down A | Aces SSJ | Civil Service Larkhall Veterans |
| 2011–12 | AFC Durbin United | University of Bath Reserves | |
| 2012–13 | Odd Down A | Newbridge | |
| 2013–14 | Newbridge | | |
| 2014–15 | Newbridge | | |
