= 2008–09 Bristol City F.C. season =

Bristol City F.C.
2008–09 season
- Manager: Gary Johnson
- Stadium: Ashton Gate
- Championship: 10th
- FA Cup: Third round
- League Cup: Second round
Home colours	Away colours

During the 2008–09 English football season, Bristol City F.C. competed in the Football League Championship.

== Season summary ==
Bristol City ended the season in 10th place.

== Competitions ==
=== Championship ===
==== League table ====
Pos	Team	Pld	W	D	L	GF	GA	GD	Pts
8	Swansea City	46	16	20	10	63	50	+13	68
9	Ipswich Town	46	17	15	14	62	53	+9	66
10	Bristol City	46	15	16	15	54	54	0	61
11	Queens Park Rangers	46	15	16	15	42	44	−2	61
12	Sheffield Wednesday	46	16	13	17	51	58	−7	61

Updated to match(es) played on 3 May 2009. Source: The Football League
Rules for classification: 1) points; 2) goal difference; 3) number of goals scored.

==== Matches ====
Championship match details
Date	Opponents	Venue	Result	Score F–A	Scorers	Attendance	Ref.
9 August 2008	Blackpool	A	W	1–0	Brooker 90'	8,244	
16 August 2008	Derby County	H	D	1–1	Maynard 23'	16,389	
23 August 2008	Coventry City	A	W	3–0	Adebola 17', McIndoe 54', Brooker 90'	17,994	
30 August 2008	Queens Park Rangers	H	D	1–1	Adebola 25'	17,543	
13 September 2008	Cardiff City	A	D	0–0		19,312	
16 September 2008	Birmingham City	H	L	1–2	Trundle 79'	18,456	
20 September 2008	Doncaster Rovers	H	W	4–1	McIndoe 48' pen., 74', Maynard 57', Sproule 61'	15,960	
27 September 2008	Wolverhampton Wanderers	A	L	0–2		24,324	
30 September 2008	Plymouth Argyle	H	D	2–2	Akinde 63', Noble 88'	17,489	
4 October 2008	Sheffield United	A	L	0–3		24,712	
18 October 2008	Norwich City	H	W	1–0	McCombe 75'	16,791	
21 October 2008	Charlton Athletic	A	W	2–0	Trundle 27', Williams 52'	21,207	
25 October 2008	Barnsley	A	D	0–0		11,551	
28 October 2008	Sheffield United	H	D	0–0		16,798	
1 November 2008	Reading	H	L	1–4	John 90'	18,296	
8 November 2008	Southampton	A	W	1–0	Johnson 52'	14,535	
15 November 2008	Nottingham Forest	H	D	2–2	Elliott 38', Fontaine 80'	17,440	
22 November 2008	Crystal Palace	A	L	2–4	Adebola 44', Maynard 74'	14,599	
25 November 2008	Watford	H	D	1–1	Maynard 71'	15,551	
29 November 2008	Preston North End	A	L	0–2		11,161	
6 December 2008	Swansea City	H	D	0–0		16,405	
10 December 2008	Ipswich Town	A	L	1–3	John 5'	17,749	
13 December 2008	Sheffield Wednesday	A	D	0–0		15,542	
20 December 2008	Burnley	H	L	1–2	Maynard 52' pen.	16,108	
26 December 2008	Watford	A	W	4–2	Maynard 1', 29', Elliott 52', Adebola 90'	15,527	
28 December 2008	Crystal Palace	H	W	1–0	Maynard 2'	18,265	
17 January 2009	Wolverhampton Wanderers	H	D	2–2	Adebola 58', Maynard 87'	16,749	
27 January 2009	Plymouth Argyle	A	W	2–0	McIndoe 62', Fontaine 86'	11,438	
31 January 2009	Barnsley	H	W	2–0	Williams 65', McIndoe 79'	15,667	
3 February 2009	Charlton Athletic	H	W	2–1	Adebola 49', 53'	15,304	
7 February 2009	Norwich City	A	W	2–1	Skuse 14', Orr 45' pen.	24,691	
14 February 2009	Southampton	H	W	2–0	Adebola 34', Sproule 90'	17,000	
17 February 2009	Doncaster Rovers	A	L	0–1		10,928	
21 February 2009	Reading	A	W	2–0	Adebola 26', Skuse 48'	22,462	
28 February 2009	Blackpool	H	D	0–0		16,855	
4 March 2009	Birmingham City	A	L	0–1		17,551	
7 March 2009	Derby County	A	L	1–2	Williams 83'	30,824	
10 March 2009	Coventry City	H	W	2–0	McAllister 66', Johnson 80'	15,706	
15 March 2009	Cardiff City	H	D	1–1	Maynard 71'	17,487	
21 March 2009	Queens Park Rangers	A	L	1–2	McIndoe 77'	14,059	
4 April 2009	Preston North End	H	D	1–1	Maynard 59'	16,596	
11 April 2009	Nottingham Forest	A	L	2–3	Sproule 13', Adebola 78'	22,776	
13 April 2009	Ipswich Town	H	D	1–1	Elliott 49'	16,430	
18 April 2009	Swansea City	A	L	0–1		15,327	
25 April 2009	Sheffield Wednesday	H	D	1–1	Johnson 25'	17,486	
3 May 2009	Burnley	A	L	0–4		18,005	

=== FA Cup ===
FA Cup match details
Round	Date	Opponents	Venue	Result	Score F–A	Scorers	Attendance	Ref.
Third round	3 January 2009	Portsmouth	A	D	0–0		14,446	
Third round replay	13 January 2009	Portsmouth	H	L	0–2		14,302	

=== League Cup ===
Football League Cup match details
Round	Date	Opponents	Venue	Result	Score F–A	Scorers	Attendance	Ref.
First round	12 August 2008	Peterborough United	H	W	2–1	Carey 53', Brooker 85'	5,684	
Second round	26 August 2008	Crewe Alexandra	A	L	1–2	Wilson 79'	3,227	

== First-team squad ==
Squad at end of season

Note: Flags indicate national team as defined under FIFA eligibility rules; some limited exceptions apply. Players may hold more than one non-FIFA nationality.

No.	Pos.	Nation	Player
1	GK	BRA	Adriano Basso
2	DF	ENG	Bradley Orr
3	DF	SCO	Jamie McAllister
4	DF	ENG	Liam Fontaine
5	DF	ENG	Jamie McCombe
6	DF	SCO	Louis Carey (Note: Carey was born in Bristol, England, but also qualified to represent Scotland internationally through his grandparents and represented them at U-21 level.)
7	MF	SCO	Scott Murray
8	MF	ENG	David Noble
10	FW	ENG	Nicky Maynard
11	MF	SCO	Michael McIndoe
14	MF	ENG	Cole Skuse
15	FW	NGA	Dele Adebola
16	FW	SVK	Peter Štyvar
17	MF	NIR	Ivan Sproule
18	DF	ENG	Brian Wilson

No.	Pos.	Nation	Player
19	MF	ENG	Jennison Myrie-Williams
20	MF	WAL	Gavin Williams
21	MF	ENG	Frankie Artus
22	GK	ENG	Chris Weale
23	FW	ENG	Lee Trundle
24	DF	WAL	Christian Ribeiro
25	MF	ENG	Marvin Elliott (Note: Elliott was born in Wandsworth, England, but also qualified to represent Jamaica internationally and would make his international debut for Jamaica in October 2011.)
26	DF	WAL	James Wilson
27	DF	ENG	Jordan Walker
28	FW	ENG	John Akinde
31	FW	TRI	Stern John (on loan from Southampton)
32	GK	IRL	Stephen Henderson
33	MF	ENG	Lee Johnson
34	DF	ENG	Izzy Iriekpen

=== Left club during season ===
Note: Flags indicate national team as defined under FIFA eligibility rules; some limited exceptions apply. Players may hold more than one non-FIFA nationality.

No.	Pos.	Nation	Player
7	MF	SCO	Scott Murray (on loan to Cheltenham Town)
9	FW	ENG	Steve Brooker (to Doncaster Rovers)
16	DF	SCO	Andy Webster (on loan from Rangers)

No.	Pos.	Nation	Player
21	MF	ENG	Frankie Artus (on loan to Cheltenham Town)
24	MF	ENG	Jennison Myrie-Williams (on loan to Cheltenham Town)
30	MF	ENG	Tristan Plummer (on loan to Torquay United)

== Transfers ==
=== In ===
Date	Nation	Position	Name	Club From	Fee
27 June 2008	WAL	MF	Gavin Williams	Ipswich Town	Undisclosed
31 July 2008	ENG	FW	Nicky Maynard	Crewe Alexandra	£2,250,000
1 January 2009	SVK	FW	Peter Štyvar	MŠK Žilina	Undisclosed

=== Out ===
Date	Nation	Position	Name	Club To	Fee
17 June 2008	ENG	MF	Alex Russell	Cheltenham Town	Free
1 July 2008	AUS	MF	Nick Carle	Crystal Palace	Undisclosed
8 July 2008	NGA	FW	Enoch Showunmi	Leeds United	Free
15 July 2008	JAM	FW	Darren Byfield	Doncaster Rovers	Free
20 August 2008	IRL	DF	Richard Keogh	Carlisle United	Undisclosed

=== Loans In ===
Date	Nation	Position	Name	Club From	Length
24 October 2008	TTO	FW	Stern John	Southampton	Two Months
29 December 2008	TTO	FW	Stern John	Southampton	Until end of season
