= Louis Williams =

Louis Williams may refer to:

== Sports ==
- Louis Williams (American football) (born 1979), American football player
- Louis Williams (footballer) (1889–?), English football (soccer) player
- Lou Williams (born 1986), American basketball player

== Others ==
- Louis Williams (sailor) (1845–1886), American sailor
- Louis Williams (architect) (1890–1980), Australian architect
- Louis L. Williams, director of the Centers for Disease Control and Prevention
- Louis Otho Williams (1908–1991), American botanist
- Pete Williams (journalist) (Louis Alan Williams, born 1952), American television correspondent

== See also ==
- Lewis Williams (disambiguation)
