= Somerset County Football Association =

Governing body of association football in Somerset

Somerset Football Association
- Somerset County FA logo
- Formation: 1885
- Purpose: Football association
- Headquarters: Charles Lewin House; Unit 5 and 10 Landmark House; Wirral Business Park
- Location(s): Glastonbury Somerset BA6 9FR
- Coordinates: 51.289216°N 2.480311°W
- Chief Executive: Jon Pike
- Website: somersetfa.com

The Somerset County Football Association, also known as the Somerset FA, is the governing body of football in the county of Somerset. The association was formed in 1885.

== History ==
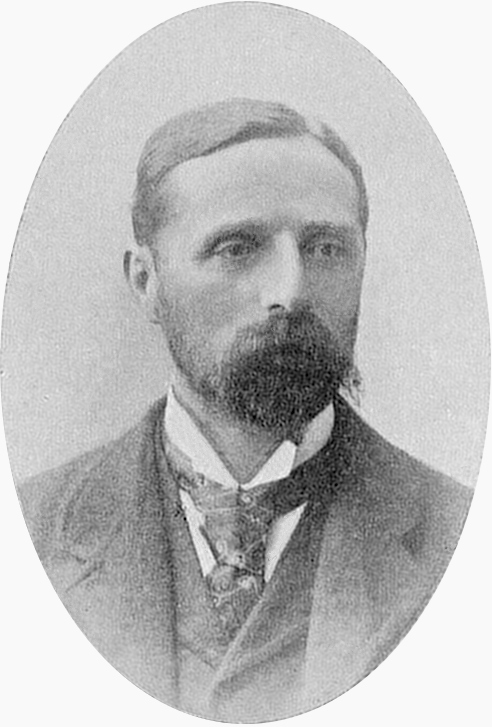
H. E. Murray-Anderson, the Association's first President

The Somerset County Football Association was formed in 1885. There was a very small number of clubs at that time and no mandatory requirement to be affiliated. It is very different from today where there are in excess of 800 clubs which equates to probably more than 2,000 teams.

The first Secretary was a Mr H J Ker Thompson of Burnham-on-Sea who resigned in 1896. At the time there was no appointed Chairman, one would be co-opted on the night of Council Meetings. Regular meeting venues were the Hare & Hounds – Shepton Mallet, The Swan Hotel – Wells, The Commercial Hotel – Midsomer Norton, Waldegrave Arms – Radstock, Star Hotel – Wells and Wells Town Hall. An average attendance was fifteen with the bulk of clubs coming from the old mining area of North Somerset. In 1904 the then Secretary/Treasurer became the first paid official with a salary of £25.00 per annum.

Charles J Lewin, who joined Council in July 1896 was appointed the Association's first Chairman in June 1904. He was a Radstock Headmaster and was also elected Somerset’s first ever member to the full Council of the English FA and retained both positions over the period of two world-wars. As a result of age and infirmity he resigned on 6 June 1945 ending a remarkable record of service to Somerset football, covering 49 years and was awarded a gold medal in recognition of his service.

A list of the County FA's key officials is provided below:

=== Presidents (year took office) ===
- H E Murray Anderson (1896)
- W J Bown (1946)
- Alderman E Sheldon (1949)
- Rt. Hon. Viscount Alexander of Hillsborough (1950)
- H M Scott MBE JP (1952)
- E J King (1977)
- H Angell (1977)
- F P Hillier MBE JP (1997 )

=== Chairmen (year took office) ===
- C J Lewin (1904)
- W J Bown (1945)
- F S Carpenter (1949)
- D G Cummins (1966)
- A J Hobbs (1984)

=== Secretary (year took office) ===
- H J Ken Thompson (resigned 1886)
- H A Sheldon (1886)
- H J Cockram (1898)
- Messrs Bown & Holloway (1919)
- F Holloway (1945)
- C A Webb (1950)
- L J Webb (1964)
- Mrs H Marchment (1991)
- J Pike (2007)

== Affiliated Leagues ==
=== Men's Saturday Leagues ===
- Somerset County Football League (1890)
- Bath and District Football League (1901)
- Bristol and Avon Football League (1910)
- Mid-Somerset Football League (1950)
- Perry Street and District Football League (1903)
- Weston-Super-Mare and District Football League (1903)
- Yeovil and District Football League (1903)

=== Men's Sunday Leagues ===
- Bath and District Football League
- Blackmore Vale Football League (1914) – Sunday
- Bridgwater & District Sunday Football League (1966)
- Frome & District Sunday Football League (1968)
- Taunton & District Sunday Football League
- Weston-Super-Mare Sunday Football League
- Yeovil Sunday Football League (1975)

=== Youth Leagues ===
- Somerset Floodlight Youth Football League
- Midsomer Norton & District Youth Football League
- Taunton Youth Football League
- Woodspring Junior Football League
- Yeovil and District Youth Football League

=== Ladies Leagues ===
- Somerset County Women’s Football League
- Somerset Girls' Football League

== Affiliated Member Clubs ==
Among the notable clubs that are affiliated to the Somerset County FA are:

- Bath City
- Bishop Sutton
- Brislington
- Bridgwater Town
- Bristol City
- Bristol Manor Farm
- Chard Town
- Clevedon Town
- Glastonbury Town
- Frome Town
- Hengrove Athletic
- Keynsham Town
- Larkhall Athletic
- Minehead
- Odd Down
- Oldland Abbotonians
- Paulton Rovers
- Portishead Town
- Radstock Town
- Shepton Mallet
- Street
- Taunton Town
- Wellington
- Wells City
- Welton Rovers
- Weston-super-Mare
- Wincanton Town
- Yeovil Town

== County Cup winners ==
Season	Men's Premier Cup	Men's Senior Cup	Women's Senior Cup	Men's Junior Cup	Women's Junior Cup	Men's Intermediate Cup
2021–22	Yeovil Town	Wells City Reserves	Bridgwater United Women	Sporting Weston	Bridgwater United Women Reserves	Mells & Vobster
2022–23	Bath City	Middlezoy Rovers	Bridgwater United Women	Sporting Weston	Paulton Rovers Ladies	Haywood Village

== Somerset Rovers F.C. ==
Somerset Rovers F.C.
- Full name: Somerset Rovers Football Club
- Nickname: the Rovers
- Founded: 1889
- Dissolved: 1894
- Ground: various
- Secretary: A. E. Boyce (1889–91), W. W. Goode
- Captain: J. C. Morland
Home colours

At the start of 1889, the association put together a side to take on Clifton Association at the latter's Bristol County Ground in a friendly, under the name Somerset Rovers, the game being umpired by W. G. Grace; the match ended 6–5 to the Rovers and was hailed as "the finest and most keenly contested games ever played" on the ground.

The scratch side caught the imagination enough for the association to compose sides on a regular basis over the next few years, and in July 1891 the Association resolved to enter the Rovers side in the 1891–92 FA Cup qualifying rounds, none of the member clubs being strong enough to enter in their own right. In the first qualifying round, the club was drawn at home to Bristol St George's, and after a trial selection match, chose players from six different clubs, including Ted Tyler, the Somerset County Cricket Club bowler, who also played for the Taunton F.C., in goal. The Rovers won the tie 6–3, but lost by a remarkable 8–5 to Clifton Association on neutral ground at Kingswood in the second, Clifton losing home advantage as the County Ground was not available; the game had ended 5–5 after 90 minutes, Clifton scoring a late leveller, and sprinting ahead in the optional extra-time period. H. Ellicott of Wells ended up on the losing side despite scoring a hat-trick. A Rovers protest against one of the goals was overruled.

The association entered the Rovers for the 1892–93 FA Cup qualifying rounds, and the side was drawn to visit Marlow, but the committee was unable to raise a side, and scratched. The withdrawal ended the Rovers' competition career, and the last match recorded for the side was a match against the Old Mannameadans of Plymouth at Paulton in January 1894, a "small" crowd witnessing a 2–2 draw.

=== Colours ===
The side wore the colours of the county association, which were crimson and black vertical stripes, edged in white.

=== Grounds ===
The Rovers played at any member club ground appropriate for the fixture; in the 1890–91 season for instance it arranged home fixtures for Taunton, Wells, and Lambridge Meadows in Bath. The club played its 1891 Cup tie with St George's at Street.
