= Yeovil and District League =

Association football league in England

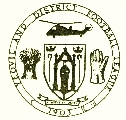
- Founded: 1903
- Country: England
- Divisions: 3
- Number of clubs: 31
- Feeder to: Somerset County League
- Promotion to: Somerset County League Division Two East
- Current champions: Martock United (2025-26)
- Website: Official Website

The Yeovil and District Football League is a football competition based in England. It has a total of three divisions including the Yeovil and District League Premier Division which is a feeder to the Somerset County League and is affiliated to the Somerset County FA.

In 1974, Westland-Yeovil progressed from the Y&DFL to the Western Football League where they spent 6 seasons.

== Member clubs 2023–24 ==
Premier Division

- Ashcott Reserves
- Ilchester Junior
- Manor Athletic
- Martock United
- Milborne Port Reserves
- Odcombe
- Stoke Sub Hamdon
- Team Gryphon
- Wagtail Athletic

Division One

- Bruton United Junior
- Bullets FC
- Evercrech Sports
- Ilchester Junior Reserves
- Langport Town FC
- Lydford FC
- Milborne Port 'A'
- Pen Mill Athletic
- Team Gryphon Reserves
- Templecombe Rovers
- Tor

Division Two

- AFC Strode Reserves
- Baltonsborough
- Barwick
- Ilchester Junior Colts
- Levels FC
- Manor Athletic Reserves
- Pen Mill Athletic Reserves
- Somerton Town Development Colts
- Stoke Sub Hamdon Reserves
- Tor Reserves
- Victoria Sports

== Champions ==
Season	Premier Division	Division One	Division Two	Division Three
2008–09	Pen Mill	Somerton Sports	Ilchester	Arrow
2009–10	Normalair	Victoria Sports	Butleigh Dynamos	Clifton Sports
2010–11	Henstridge	Mermaid United	Clifton Sports	Brhoden
2011–12	Henstridge	Aller Park Rangers	Brhoden	Montacute
2012–13	Waggy Athletic	Brhoden	Bradford Abbas	Milborne Port 'A'
2013–14	Brhoden	Ashcott	Somerton Reserves	Aller Park Rangers

Division Three was discontinued after the 2013–14 season.

Season	Premier Division	Division One	Division Two
2014–15	Somerton	Montacute	Ilchester
2015-16	Normalair	Wagtail Athletic	Keinton Park Rangers
2016-17	Templecombe Rovers	AFC Camel	Brhoden
2017-18	Somerton Town Reserves	Penn Mill Athletic	Langport & Huish Sports
2018-19	Ashcott	Milborne Port	Queen Camel
2019-20	Templecombe Rovers	Manor Athletic	Wyndham Athletic FC
2020-21	Queen Camel	Ashcott Reserves	Ilchester Junior Reserves
2021-22	Templecombe Rovers	Ilchester Junior Reserves	South Cheriton United Reserves
