= Wincanton Town F.C. =

Association football club in England

Coordinates: 51.0482°N 2.4030°W

Wincanton Town
- Full name: Wincanton Town Football Club
- Nickname: The Wasps
- Founded: 1890
- Ground: Wincanton Sports Ground, Wincanton
- Chairman: Terry Wise
- Manager: Chris Wise
- League: Western League Division One
- 2025–26: Wessex League Premier Division, 19th of 20 (relegated)
| Home colours | Away colours |

Wincanton Town Football Club is a football club based in Wincanton, Somerset, England. They are currently members of the Western League Division One and play at the Wincanton Sports Ground. The club is affiliated to the Somerset County Football Association.

== History ==
The club was established in 1890, and originally played at Dancing Lane on West Hill. The club played most of its football in the Yeovil and District League in its early years. In more recent years the club won Division two of the Yeovil league in the 1988–89 campaign. This was followed up by two more years of league success when they won Division one the next season, and were crowned league champions another season later. Sometime after this in the 1990s the club then sold its ground at Dancing Lane to move to its current home at Moor Lane.

The club was promoted to Division three of the Somerset County League when they finished as runners-up in the Yeovil league at the end of the 2002–03 campaign. Their first season in the new league saw them gain promotion to Division two when they finished as runners-up. They played for two seasons in division two before deciding to swap to the Dorset Football League, winning the Senior league at the first attempt and gaining promotion to the Dorset Premier Football League. The club stayed in the Dorset Premier League until the end of the 2012–13 campaign when as finishing runners up they gained promotion to division one of the Western Football League. That season also the club achieve a double by winning the Somerset Senior Cup. On 15 October 2013 the club hosted Yeovil Town F.C. to celebrate the opening of Moor Lane's new floodlights. Yeovil won 8–0. Current manager Chris Wise took over in 2015, building year on year and improving positions in the league, resulting in reaching the playoffs three years running in years 2022, 2023 and 2024. At the end of the 2023/2024 season the club was promoted and laterally moved to the Wessex Premier Division.

== Ground ==
The team play their home games at the Wincanton Sports Ground on Moor Lane.

== Honours ==
=== League honours ===
- Dorset Premier Football League:
  - Runners-up (1): 2012–13
- Dorset Football League Senior Division:
  - Winners (1): 2006–07
- Somerset County League Division Three:
  - Runners-up (1): 2003–04
- Yeovil and District League Premier Division:
  - Winners (1): 1990–91
  - Runners-up (1): 2002–03
- Yeovil and District League Division One:
  - Winners (1): 1989–90
- Yeovil and District League Division Two:
  - Winners (1): 1988–89

=== Cup honours ===
- Somerset Senior Cup:
  - Winners (1): 2012–13
- Dorset Premier Football League Supplementary Cup:
  - Winners (1): 2008–09
- Yeovil and District League John Haywood Cup:
  - Winners (1): 2000–01
