= Lewis Williams (rugby union) =

Welsh rugby union player

Lewis Williams, born 24 October 1987 (age 37) in Pentrebach, Merthyr Tydfil County Borough, Wales is a rugby union player for Pontypridd RFC in the Principality Premiership.

Williams joined Pontypridd from Merthyr RFC in 2008, and swiftly made a mark at Pontypridd as a fleet-footed winger, being called up to train with the Wales Sevens team in November 2008.

Williams' older brother Gavin is a midfielder with Merthyr Town.

His position of choice is at wing.
