= 1932–33 Chester F.C. season =

Chester
1932–33 season
- Manager: Charlie Hewitt
- Stadium: Sealand Road
- Football League Third Division North: 4th
- FA Cup: Fourth round
- Welsh Cup: Winner
- Top goalscorer: League: Joe Mantle (34); All: Joe Mantle (39)
- Highest home attendance: 16,835 vs Wrexham (4 February)
- Lowest home attendance: 4,977 vs York City (29 March)
- Average home league attendance: 8,136; 2nd in division
Home colours

The 1932–33 season was the second season of competitive association football in the Football League played by Chester, an English club based in Chester, Cheshire.

It was the club's second consecutive season in the Third Division North since the election to the Football League. Alongside competing in the league, the club also participated in the FA Cup and the Welsh Cup.

== Football League ==
| Pos | Team | Pld | HW | HD | HL | HGF | HGA | AW | AD | AL | AGF | AGA | GAv | Pts | Promotion |
|---|---|---|---|---|---|---|---|---|---|---|---|---|---|---|---|
| 2 | Wrexham | 42 | 18 | 2 | 1 | 75 | 15 | 6 | 7 | 8 | 31 | 36 | 2.078 | 57 | |
| 3 | Stockport County | 42 | 16 | 2 | 3 | 69 | 30 | 5 | 10 | 6 | 30 | 28 | 1.707 | 54 | |
| 4 | Chester | 42 | 15 | 4 | 2 | 57 | 25 | 7 | 4 | 10 | 37 | 41 | 1.424 | 52 | Welsh Cup winners |
| 5 | Walsall | 42 | 16 | 4 | 1 | 53 | 15 | 3 | 6 | 12 | 22 | 43 | 1.293 | 48 | |
| 6 | Doncaster Rovers | 42 | 13 | 8 | 0 | 52 | 26 | 4 | 6 | 11 | 25 | 53 | 0.975 | 48 | |

Source: rsssf.com

=== Results summary ===
| Overall | | | | | | | | Home | | | | | | Away | | | | | |
| Pld | W | D | L | GF | GA | GAv | Pts | W | D | L | GF | GA | Pts | W | D | L | GF | GA | Pts |
|---|---|---|---|---|---|---|---|---|---|---|---|---|---|---|---|---|---|---|---|
| 42 | 22 | 8 | 12 | 94 | 66 | 1.424 | 52 | 15 | 4 | 2 | 57 | 25 | 34 | 7 | 4 | 10 | 37 | 41 | 18 |

Source: rsssf.com

=== Results by matchday ===
| Round | 1 | 2 | 3 | 4 | 5 | 6 | 7 | 8 | 9 | 10 | 11 | 12 | 13 | 14 | 15 | 16 | 17 | 18 | 19 | 20 | 21 | 22 | 23 | 24 | 25 | 26 | 27 | 28 | 29 | 30 | 31 | 32 | 33 | 34 | 35 | 36 | 37 | 38 | 39 | 40 | 41 | 42 |
|---|---|---|---|---|---|---|---|---|---|---|---|---|---|---|---|---|---|---|---|---|---|---|---|---|---|---|---|---|---|---|---|---|---|---|---|---|---|---|---|---|---|---|
| Result | L | D | W | L | W | D | W | W | W | W | W | L | L | W | D | W | D | W | W | L | W | W | W | W | W | L | L | W | D | D | W | L | W | W | L | W | W | D | L | D | L | L |
| Position | 15 | 18 | 11 | 14 | 9 | 9 | 4 | 1 | 1 | 1 | 1 | 1 | 1 | 1 | 1 | 1 | 1 | 1 | 1 | 1 | 1 | 1 | 1 | 1 | 1 | 2 | 2 | 2 | 2 | 3 | 2 | 3 | 2 | 1 | 2 | 2 | 1 | 2 | 2 | 3 | 3 | 4 |

Source: Statto.com
W = Win; D = Draw; L = Loss

=== Matches ===
| Date | Opponents | Venue | Result | Score | Scorers | Attendance |
|---|---|---|---|---|---|---|
| 27 August | Mansfield Town | A | L | 0–1 | | 8,009 |
| 31 August | Southport | H | D | 1–1 | Jennings | 11,210 |
| 3 September | Rotherham United | H | W | 1–0 | Ferguson | 7,657 |
| 6 September | Southport | A | L | 1–2 | Roscoe | 6,219 |
| 10 September | Accrington Stanley | A | W | 4–1 | Jennings, Wyper (2), Hedley | 5,569 |
| 14 September | Stockport County | H | D | 2–2 | Hedley, Gray | 8,031 |
| 17 September | New Brighton | H | W | 3–0 | Ferguson (pen.), Jennings, Hedley | 9,655 |
| 21 September | Walsall | H | W | 1–0 | Stevenson | 5,311 |
| 24 September | Wrexham | A | W | 2–1 | Mantle, Bell | 19,649 |
| 1 October | Barrow | A | W | 3–2 | Ferguson, Bell, Cresswell | 6,414 |
| 8 October | Carlisle United | H | W | 4–0 | Mantle (2), Cresswell, Stevenson | 5,732 |
| 15 October | York City | A | L | 1–3 | Cresswell | 5,689 |
| 22 October | Tranmere Rovers | H | L | 1–2 | Hedley | 7,773 |
| 29 October | Halifax Town | A | W | 2–0 | Mantle (2) | 4,906 |
| 5 November | Hartlepools United | H | D | 3–3 | Cresswell, Mercer, Wyper (pen.) | 6,947 |
| 12 November | Barnsley | A | W | 3–0 | Mantle, Hedley, Cresswell | 6,975 |
| 19 November | Hull City | H | D | 1–1 | Mantle | 10,064 |
| 3 December | Darlington | H | W | 5–2 | Hedley (2), Mantle (2), Mercer | 5,558 |
| 17 December | Gateshead | H | W | 3–1 | Cresswell, Hedley, Mantle | 7,030 |
| 24 December | Walsall | A | L | 1–3 | Mantle | 6,606 |
| 26 December | Crewe Alexandra | H | W | 3–1 | Hedley, Mantle (2) | 14,000 |
| 27 December | Crewe Alexandra | A | W | 1–0 | Mantle | 11,219 |
| 31 December | Mansfield Town | H | W | 5–2 | Mantle (3), Cresswell, Anthoney (o.g.) | 6,618 |
| 7 January | Rotherham United | A | W | 5–0 | Armes, Mantle (4) | 4,724 |
| 21 January | Accrington Stanley | H | W | 4–2 | Hedley (3), Armes | 4,980 |
| 4 February | Wrexham | H | L | 0–3 | | 16,835 |
| 8 February | New Brighton | A | L | 1–3 | Mantle | 3,384 |
| 11 February | Barrow | H | W | 2–1 | Hedley, Butler | 6,268 |
| 18 February | Carlisle United | A | D | 1–1 | Mantle | 4,490 |
| 4 March | Tranmere Rovers | A | D | 2–2 | Mantle (2) | 8,649 |
| 11 March | Halifax Town | H | W | 6–3 | Cresswell, Mercer, Mantle (4, 1pen.) | 7,287 |
| 18 March | Hartlepools United | A | L | 1–3 | Mantle | 5,293 |
| 25 March | Barnsley | H | W | 3–1 | Cresswell, Hedley, Mercer | 6,508 |
| 29 March | York City | H | W | 5–0 | Mantle (2), Mercer (3) | 4,977 |
| 1 April | Hull City | A | L | 0–2 | | 20,248 |
| 8 April | Doncaster Rovers | H | W | 2–0 | Mantle, Hedley | 5,869 |
| 14 April | Rochdale | H | W | 2–0 | Cresswell, Hedley | 9,870 |
| 15 April | Darlington | A | D | 1–1 | Mantle | 3,064 |
| 17 April | Rochdale | A | L | 0–2 | | 3,742 |
| 27 April | Doncaster Rovers | A | D | 3–3 | Cresswell (2), Kelly | 4,379 |
| 29 April | Gateshead | A | L | 0–3 | | 1,424 |
| 6 May | Stockport County | A | L | 5–8 | Kelly (4, 1pen.), Armes | 4,255 |

== FA Cup ==
| Round | Date | Opponents | Venue | Result | Score | Scorers | Attendance |
|---|---|---|---|---|---|---|---|
| First round | 26 November | Rotherham United (3N) | H | W | 4–0 | Mantle, Wyper (2), Hedley | 7,000 |
| Second round | 10 December | Yeovil & Petters United (SouL) | H | W | 2–1 | Cresswell, Hedley | 8,000 |
| Third round | 14 January | Fulham (2) | H | W | 5–0 | Mercer, Hedley (4) | 14,328 |
| Fourth round | 28 January | Halifax Town (3N) | H | D | 0–0 | | 10,538 |
| Fourth round replay | 2 February | Halifax Town (3N) | A | L | 2–3 (a.e.t) | Mantle (2) | 14,224 |

== Welsh Cup ==
| Round | Date | Opponents | Venue | Result | Score | Scorers | Attendance |
|---|---|---|---|---|---|---|---|
| Seventh round | 22 February | Crewe Alexandra (3N) | A | W | 5–3 | Butler, Mantle (2), Kelly (2) | 2,000 |
| Quarterfinal | 14 March | Llanelly (SouL) | A | W | 4–0 | Kelly, Harris (o.g.), Hedley, Jennings | 10,500 |
| Semifinal | 5 April | Cardiff City (3S) | H | W | 2–1 | Mercer, Cresswell (pen.) | 9,400 |
| Final | 3 May | Wrexham (3N) | H | W | 2–0 | Kelly, Cresswell | 15,000 |

== Season statistics ==
| Nat | Player | Total | | League | | FA Cup | | Welsh Cup | |
| Nat | Player | A | G | A | G | A | G | A | G |
|---|---|---|---|---|---|---|---|---|---|
Goalkeepers
| (Republic of Ireland) | Johnny Burke | 22 | – | 16 | – | 2 | – | 4 | – |
| | Richard Finnigan | 1 | – | 1 | – | – | – | – | – |
| | Bill Johnson | 28 | – | 25 | – | 3 | – | – | – |
Field players
| (England) | Sammy Armes midfielder | 18 | 3 | 16 | 3 | 2 | – | – | – |
| | Billy Bell | 27 | 2 | 21 | 2 | 5 | – | 1 | – |
| (England) | Fred Bennett | 51 | – | 42 | – | 5 | – | 4 | – |
| (England) | Herbert Butler | 3 | 2 | 2 | 1 | – | – | 1 | 1 |
| (England) | Frank Cresswell | 46 | 15 | 38 | 12 | 5 | 1 | 3 | 2 |
| (Scotland) | George Dickie | 1 | – | 1 | – | – | – | – | – |
| (England) | Dick Duckworth | 17 | – | 14 | – | – | – | 3 | – |
| (Wales) | Danny Ferguson | 20 | 3 | 19 | 3 | – | – | 1 | – |
| | Bob Gray | 6 | 1 | 6 | 1 | – | – | – | – |
| (England) | Foster Hedley | 50 | 23 | 41 | 16 | 5 | 6 | 4 | 1 |
| | Baden Herod | 48 | – | 39 | – | 5 | – | 4 | – |
| (Scotland) | Tom Jennings | 11 | 4 | 9 | 3 | – | – | 2 | 1 |
| | Henry Jolly | 9 | – | 9 | – | – | – | – | – |
| (England) | Gerry Kelly | 20 | 9 | 15 | 5 | 1 | – | 4 | 4 |
| (England) | Joe Mantle | 41 | 39 | 33 | 34 | 5 | 3 | 3 | 2 |
| | Arthur Mercer | 35 | 9 | 27 | 7 | 5 | 1 | 3 | 1 |
| | John Pitcairn | 30 | – | 22 | – | 5 | – | 3 | – |
| | Jack Roscoe | 1 | 1 | 1 | 1 | – | – | – | – |
| (England) | Frank Searle | 4 | – | 4 | – | – | – | – | – |
| | Harry Skitt | 45 | – | 36 | – | 5 | – | 4 | – |
| | John Stevenson | 11 | 2 | 11 | 2 | – | – | – | – |
| | Tommy Vaughan | 1 | – | 1 | – | – | – | – | – |
| | Ron Viner | 1 | – | 1 | – | – | – | – | – |
| | Tommy Wyper | 14 | 5 | 12 | 3 | 2 | 2 | – | – |
| | Own goals | – | 2 | – | 1 | – | – | – | 1 |
| | Total | 51 | 120 | 42 | 94 | 5 | 13 | 4 | 13 |
