= 1931–32 Chester F.C. season =

Chester
1931–32 season
- Manager: Charlie Hewitt
- Stadium: Sealand Road
- Football League Third Division North: 3rd
- FA Cup: Second round
- Welsh Cup: Semifinal
- Top goalscorer: League: Tom Jennings (30); All: Tom Jennings (34)
- Highest home attendance: 13,658 vs Wrexham (30 September)
- Lowest home attendance: 4,618 vs Carlisle United (30 April)
- Average home league attendance: 7,952; 2nd in division
Home colours

The 1931–32 season was the first season of competitive association football in the Football League played by Chester, an English club based in Chester, Cheshire.

Chester was elected to the Football League in the second round of voting surpassing Nelson after the first voting ended in a draw.

== Football League ==
Pos	Team	Pld	W	D	L	GF	GA	GAv	Pts	Promotion
1	Lincoln City (C, P)	40	26	5	9	106	47	2.255	57	Promotion to the Second Division
2	Gateshead	40	25	7	8	94	48	1.958	57	
3	Chester	40	21	8	11	78	60	1.300	50	
4	Tranmere Rovers	40	19	11	10	107	58	1.845	49	
5	Barrow	40	24	1	15	86	59	1.458	49	

Source: rsssf.com
(C) Champions; (P) Promoted

=== Results summary ===
Overall								Home						Away					
Pld	W	D	L	GF	GA	GAv	Pts	W	D	L	GF	GA	Pts	W	D	L	GF	GA	Pts
40	21	8	11	78	60	1.3	50	16	2	2	54	22	34	5	6	9	24	38	16

Source: rsssf.com

=== Results by matchday ===
Round	1	2	3	4	5	6	7	8	9	10	11	12	13	14	15	16	17	18	19	20	21	22	23	24	25	26	27	28	29	30	31	32	33	34	35	36	37	38	39	40
Result	D	L	D	W	L	D	D	L	W	W	W	D	W	D	W	D	W	L	W	L	D	W	L	W	W	W	L	W	W	L	W	W	L	W	W	W	L	W	L	W
Position	11	17	16	11	16	13	15	16	13	12	9	9	7	6	5	7	5	6	6	7	8	7	8	8	7	6	8	6	6	6	6	5	7	7	5	3	4	3	5	3

Source: Statto.com
W = Win; D = Draw; L = Loss

=== Matches ===
Date	Opponents	Venue	Result	Score	Scorers	Attendance
29 August	Wigan Borough	H	W	4–0†	Cresswell, Ranson, Jennings, Hedley	12,770
2 September	Wrexham	A	D	1–1	Jennings	19,000
5 September	Darlington	A	L	1–4	Jennings	4,222
9 September	Hartlepools United	A	D	2–2	Cresswell, Jennings	4,717
12 September	Halifax Town	H	W	3–1	Hedley (2), A. Ferguson	6,824
16 September	Hartlepools United	H	L	2–3	Ranson, Cresswell	8,417
19 September	Walsall	A	D	1–1	Jennings	4,455
26 September	Gateshead	H	D	1–1	C. Matthews	10,195
30 September	Wrexham	H	L	2–5	Thompson, Jennings	13,658
3 October	New Brighton	A	W	1–0	Hedley	5,105
10 October	Barrow	H	W	4–2	Cresswell, Thompson, Jennings (2)	8,322
17 October	Accrington Stanley	H	W	1–0	Jennings	7,094
24 October	Stockport County	A	D	0–0		8,811
31 October	Rotherham United	H	W	2–1	Robson, Hedley	6,704
7 November	Tranmere Rovers	A	D	2–2	Jennings, Robson	11,578
14 November	York City	H	W	3–0	Mercer, Hedley, Robson	7,207
21 November	Southport	A	D	1–1	Valentine	6,023
5 December	Rochdale	A	W	3–0	Cresswell, Hedley, Jennings	3,199
19 December	Carlisle United	A	L	3–4	Hedley, Robson, Mercer	4,220
25 December	Lincoln City	H	W	2–1	Cresswell, Reilly	10,184
26 December	Lincoln City	A	L	0–4		12,856
9 January	Doncaster Rovers	H	D	1–1	Bennett (pen.)	5,466
16 January	Darlington	H	W	3–1	Jennings, Mercer (2)	5,480
23 January	Halifax Town	A	L	1–2	Hedley	3,703
30 January	Walsall	H	W	5–1	Jennings (5)	5,198
6 February	Gateshead	A	W	2–1	Mercer, Jennings	7,688
13 February	New Brighton	H	W	2–0	Cresswell, Jennings	6,294
20 February	Barrow	A	L	0–4		6,557
27 February	Accrington Stanley	A	W	3–2	Jennings (2), Cresswell	3,981
5 March	Stockport County	H	W	2–1	Wyper (2)	6,759
12 March	Rotherham United	A	L	0–3		4,023
19 March	Tranmere Rovers	H	W	3–1	Gray (o.g.), Mercer, Herod (pen.)	8,810
25 March	Hull City	H	W	2–0	Jennings (2)	13,648
26 March	York City	A	L	1–3	Cresswell	5,368
28 March	Hull City	A	W	2–0	Robinson, Jennings	7,914
2 April	Southport	H	W	4–0	Mercer, Jennings (2), Wyper	7,775
6 April	Crewe Alexandra	H	W	1–0	Wyper	6,938
9 April	Doncaster Rovers	A	L	0–3		4,365
16 April	Rochdale	H	W	7–2	Mercer, Williams (o.g.), Jennings (4), Hedley	4,658
23 April	Crewe Alexandra	A	L	0–1		6,823
30 April	Carlisle United	H	W	4–1	Cresswell, Mercer, Jennings, Hedley	4,618

† - Wigan Borough later resigned from the league, record expunged

== FA Cup ==
Round	Date	Opponents	Venue	Result	Score	Scorers	Attendance
First round	28 November	Hartlepools United (3N)	H	W	4–1	Hedley (2), Valentine, Bennett	8,403
Second round	12 December	Darwen (LanC)	A	L	1–2	Murray (o.g.)	6,500

== Welsh Cup ==
Round	Date	Opponents	Venue	Result	Score	Scorers	Attendance
Fifth round	3 February	Oswestry Town (B&DL)	H	D	1–1	Jennings	2,000
Fifth round replay	11 February	Oswestry Town (B&DL)	A	W	4–0	Hedley (2), Jennings (2)	1,500
Quarterfinal	2 March	Cardiff City (3S)	H	W	2–1	Mercer, Jennings	9,400
Semifinal	13 April	Swansea Town (2)	H	L	0–2		10,234

== Season statistics ==
Nat	Player	Total		League		FA Cup		Welsh Cup	
Nat	Player	A	G	A	G	A	G	A	G
Goalkeepers
(Republic of Ireland)	Johnny Burke	12	–	11	–	–	–	1	–
	Bill Johnson	34	–	29	–	2	–	3	–
Field players
(England)	Josh Atkinson	7	–	7	–	–	–	–	–
(England)	Fred Bennett	44	2	38	1	2	1	4	–
(England)	Frank Cresswell	45	9	39	9	2	–	4	–
(Wales)	Spencer Evans	1	–	1	–	–	–	–	–
	Archie Ferguson	2	1	1	1	–	–	1	–
(Wales)	Danny Ferguson	11	–	10	–	–	–	1	–
(England)	Foster Hedley	41	14	35	10	2	2	4	2
	Baden Herod	46	1	40	1	2	–	4	–
(Scotland)	Tom Jennings	44	34	39	30	1	–	4	4
	Walter Jones	2	–	2	–	–	–	–	–
	Ernest Keeley	22	–	19	–	2	–	1	–
(Scotland)	Alex Lambie	1	–	1	–	–	–	–	–
(Wales)	Billy Matthews	6	–	5	–	–	–	1	–
	Cyril Matthews	10	1	9	1	–	–	1	–
	Arthur Mercer	35	10	29	9	2	–	4	1
	Ernie Millsom	13	–	11	–	1	–	1	–
(England)	Jack Ranson	8	1	8	1	–	–	–	–
	William Reilly	41	1	35	1	2	–	4	–
(England)	Matt Robinson	6	1	6	1	–	–	–	–
	Cud Robson	16	4	13	4	2	–	1	–
	Harry Skitt	36	–	31	–	1	–	4	–
	Andy Thompson	7	2	7	2	–	–	–	–
	Albert Valentine	3	2	2	1	1	1	–	–
	Tommy Wyper	13	4	12	4	–	–	1	–
	Own goals	–	3	–	2	–	1	–	–
	Total	46	90	40	78	2	5	4	7
