= 1933–34 Chester F.C. season =

Chester
1933–34 season
- Manager: Charlie Hewitt
- Stadium: Sealand Road
- Football League Third Division North: 10th
- FA Cup: Second round
- Welsh Cup: Quarterfinal
- Top goalscorer: League: Joe Mantle (18); All: Joe Mantle (20)
- Highest home attendance: 14,481 vs Wrexham (27 January)
- Lowest home attendance: 3,728 vs Mansfield Town (10 March)
- Average home league attendance: 6,609; 5th in division

The 1933–34 season was the third season of competitive association football in the Football League played by Chester, an English club based in Chester, Cheshire.

It was the club's third consecutive season in the Third Division North since the election to the Football League. Alongside competing in the league, the club also participated in the FA Cup and the Welsh Cup.

Over November and December 1933, Chester scored six or more goals in three consecutive fixtures. No other English team did this again until EFL Championship club Fulham in January 2022.

== Football League ==
Pos	Team	Pld	HW	HD	HL	HGF	HGA	AW	AD	AL	AGF	AGA	GAv	Pts
8	Barrow	42	12	5	4	78	45	7	4	10	38	49	1.234	47
9	Halifax Town	42	15	2	4	57	30	5	2	14	23	61	0.879	44
10	Chester	42	11	6	4	59	26	6	0	15	30	60	1.035	40
11	Hartlepools United	42	14	3	4	54	24	2	4	15	35	69	0.957	39
12	York City	42	11	5	5	44	28	4	3	14	27	46	0.959	38

Source: rsssf.com

=== Results summary ===
Overall								Home						Away					
Pld	W	D	L	GF	GA	GAv	Pts	W	D	L	GF	GA	Pts	W	D	L	GF	GA	Pts
42	17	6	19	89	86	1.035	40	11	6	4	59	26	28	6	0	15	30	60	12

Source: rsssf.com

=== Results by matchday ===
Round	1	2	3	4	5	6	7	8	9	10	11	12	13	14	15	16	17	18	19	20	21	22	23	24	25	26	27	28	29	30	31	32	33	34	35	36	37	38	39	40	41	42
Result	W	L	L	L	D	W	L	L	L	D	D	L	W	L	W	W	W	L	D	W	W	L	L	L	L	W	L	D	L	L	D	L	W	W	L	W	W	L	W	W	W	W
Position	8	8	16	18	16	12	16	18	19	19	19	20	19	19	17	16	14	15	14	11	9	11	11	16	17	17	18	19	20	20	20	20	19	19	19	18	16	18	15	12	11	10

Source: Statto.com
W = Win; D = Draw; L = Loss

=== Matches ===
Date	Opponents	Venue	Result	Score	Scorers	Attendance
26 August	Rotherham United	H	W	5–1	Kelly, Mantle, Mercer, Cresswell, Hedley	9,616
30 August	Halifax Town	A	L	0–1		8,517
2 September	Walsall	A	L	0–5		8,786
6 September	Halifax Town	H	L	1–2	Cresswell (pen.)	8,747
9 September	York City	H	D	1–1	Whittam	7,942
16 September	Wrexham	A	W	3–0	Hedley (2), Mantle	18,782
23 September	Doncaster Rovers	A	L	1–3	Mantle	6,057
30 September	Barrow	H	L	1–3	Mercer	6,981
7 October	Carlisle United	A	L	0–1		5,473
14 October	Stockport County	H	D	1–1	Kelly	6,153
21 October	Hartlepools United	H	D	3–3	Kelly, Whittam (2)	6,368
28 October	Mansfield Town	A	L	1–2	Kelly	4,007
4 November	Barnsley	H	W	4–2	Whittam, Mantle (3)	6,501
11 November	Tranmere Rovers	A	L	1–6	McLachlan	9,005
18 November	Rochdale	H	W	7–1	Armes (4), McLachlan, Mantle (2)	4,477
2 December	Accrington Stanley	H	W	7–0	Armes (2), Mantle (3), McLachlan, Cresswell	4,795
16 December	Darlington	H	W	8–0	Armes (3), Mantle (4, 1pen.), McLachlan	3,990
23 December	Southport	A	L	1–3	Armes	3,023
25 December	New Brighton	H	D	0–0		8,970
26 December	New Brighton	A	W	2–0	Cresswell, Mantle	6,153
30 December	Rotherham United	A	W	3–0	McLachlan (2), Cresswell	5,132
1 January	Chesterfield	A	L	1–6	Kelly	10,957
6 January	Walsall	H	L	0–1		5,979
20 January	York City	A	L	2–3	Hughes (2, 1pen.)	4,171
27 January	Wrexham	H	L	1–2	Mantle	14,481
3 February	Doncaster Rovers	H	W	3–1	C. Roberts (2), Hughes (pen.)	4,012
10 February	Barrow	A	L	0–9		4,091
17 February	Carlisle United	H	D	3–3	Kelly, N. Roberts, Mantle	4,454
24 February	Stockport County	A	L	2–4	Kelly, Hughes	10,973
3 March	Hartlepools United	A	L	0–1		2,900
10 March	Mansfield Town	H	D	1–1	McLachlan	3,728
17 March	Barnsley	A	L	0–2		8,195
24 March	Tranmere Rovers	H	W	4–2	Wallbanks (2), Whittam, Sargeant	6,545
30 March	Crewe Alexandra	A	W	5–3	Wallbanks (3), Hughes (2)	7,810
31 March	Rochdale	A	L	0–6		2,942
2 April	Crewe Alexandra	H	W	1–0	Wilson	7,874
7 April	Chesterfield	H	W	3–2	Wallbanks (2), Wilson	9,051
14 April	Accrington Stanley	A	L	1–4	Wilson	2,096
21 April	Gateshead	H	W	4–0	Whittam (3), Wallbanks	4,564
25 April	Gateshead	A	W	3–1	Whittam (2), Wallbanks	1,043
28 April	Darlington	A	W	4–0	Whittam, Hughes, Wallbanks (2)	2,117
31 August	Southport	H	W	1–0	Wallbanks	3,768

== FA Cup ==
Round	Date	Opponents	Venue	Result	Score	Scorers	Attendance
First round	25 November	Darlington (3N)	H	W	6–1	Mantle (2), Armes (3), Cresswell	7,000
Second round	9 December	Southend United (3S)	A	L	1–2	Cresswell	6,900

== Welsh Cup ==
Round	Date	Opponents	Venue	Result	Score	Scorers	Attendance
Seventh round	7 February	Swansea Town (2)	H	W	2–1	Hughes (2pens.)	4,300
Quarterfinal	7 March	Bangor City (B&DL)	A	L	0–1		5,500

== Season statistics ==
Nat	Player	Total		League		FA Cup		Welsh Cup	
Nat	Player	A	G	A	G	A	G	A	G
Goalkeepers
(Republic of Ireland)	Johnny Burke	21	–	17	–	2	–	2	–
	Richard Finnigan	12	–	12	–	–	–	–	–
(Scotland)	Robert Middleton	13	–	13	–	–	–	–	–
Field players
(England)	Sammy Armes	17	13	15	10	2	3	–	–
	Billy Bell	13	–	13	–	–	–	–	–
(England)	Fred Bennett	40	–	36	–	2	–	2	–
(England)	Frank Cresswell	22	7	20	5	2	2	-	-
(England)	Dick Duckworth	19	–	16	–	2	–	1	–
	Tom Freeman	18	–	17	–	–	–	1	–
(England)	Foster Hedley	12	3	12	3	–	–	–	–
	Jack Hughes	21	9	19	7	–	–	2	2
	Henry Jones	8	–	8	–	–	–	–	–
	John Kay	2	–	2	–	–	–	–	–
(England)	Gerry Kelly	21	7	19	7	–	–	2	–
	Jack Little	27	–	24	–	2	–	1	–
(England)	Joe Mantle	28	20	24	18	2	2	2	–
(Scotland)	George McLachlan	32	7	29	7	2	–	1	–
	Arthur Mercer	7	2	7	2	–	–	–	–
	Sam Morris	6	–	5	–	–	–	1	–
	John Pitcairn	40	–	37	–	2	–	1	–
	Charlie Roberts	7	2	5	2	–	–	2	–
	Norman Roberts	1	1	1	1	–	–	–	–
	Charlie Sargeant	10	1	10	1	–	–	–	–
	Harry Skitt	38	–	34	–	2	–	2	–
	Billy Upton	2	–	2	–	–	–	–	–
	Tommy Vaughan	2	–	1	–	–	–	1	–
(England)	John Wallbanks	11	12	11	12	–	–	–	–
	Ernie Whittam	37	11	34	11	2	–	1	–
(England)	Arthur Wilson	11	3	11	3	–	–	–	–
	George Wyness	8	–	8	–	–	–	–	–
	Own goals	–	–	–	–	–	–	–	–
	Total	46	98	42	89	2	7	2	2
