= 1929–30 Nelson F.C. season =

Nelson
1929–30 season
- Manager: Jack English
- Football League Third Division North: 19th
- FA Cup: First Round
- Top goalscorer: League: Tom Carmedy and Ernie Dixon (10); All: Tom Carmedy and Ernie Dixon (10)
- Highest home attendance: 5,434 (vs Southport, 31 August 1929)
- Lowest home attendance: 1,359 (vs Rochdale, 14 January 1930)
- Average home league attendance: 3,346
Home colours

The 1929–30 season was the 49th season in the history of Nelson Football Club, and their ninth as a professional club in The Football League. Jack English remained as manager after guiding the team to a 15th-placed finish during the previous campaign. After a poor start to the 1929–30 season, Nelson improved and were seventh in the Third Division North at Christmas. However, in the new year the team faltered and lost 10 of its last 12 matches, thus finishing in 19th position. Nelson ended the season with a record of 13 wins, 7 draws and 22 defeats, giving a total of 33 points. The team was knocked out in the first round of the FA Cup after losing 0–3 at home to Crewe Alexandra.

Nelson used a total of 29 different players, 5 of whom made just a single appearance during the season. The top goalscorers in the 1929–30 campaign were centre forwards Tom Carmedy and Ernie Dixon, who each netted 10 goals. Fullback Billy Fairhurst made the most appearances for Nelson, missing only two league matches. In the opening four matches of the season, four different goalkeepers were used. Attendances at the club's Seedhill ground were considerably lower than in previous seasons, with an average gate of 3,346, a decrease of more than 30 per cent from 1928–29.

== Football League Third Division North ==
=== Key ===
- H = Home match
- A = Away match
- In Result column, Nelson's score shown first

=== Match results ===
| Date | Opponents | Result | Goalscorers | Attendance |
|---|---|---|---|---|
| 31 August 1929 | Southport (H) | 2–2 | Buchanan, Jones (o.g.) | 5,434 |
| 4 September 1929 | Darlington (A) | 1–6 | Ferrari | 5,687 |
| 7 September 1929 | Crewe Alexandra (A) | 0–4 | | 4,131 |
| 11 September 1929 | Darlington (H) | 0–1 | | 4,002 |
| 14 September 1929 | York City (H) | 3–1 | Buchanan (2), Ferrari | 4,483 |
| 21 September 1929 | Stockport County (A) | 1–6 | Ferrari | 7,789 |
| 24 September 1929 | Accrington Stanley (A) | 0–3 | | 7,108 |
| 28 September 1929 | New Brighton (H) | 2–1 | Kelly | 3,458 |
| 1 October 1929 | Wrexham (H) | 4–0 | Carmedy (3), Hedley | 2,302 |
| 5 October 1929 | Port Vale (A) | 1–3 | Kelly | 7,746 |
| 12 October 1929 | Barrow (H) | 2–0 | Buchanan, Hedley | 3,732 |
| 19 October 1929 | Hartlepools United (A) | 2–1 | Dixon, Kelly | 5,695 |
| 26 October 1929 | Doncaster Rovers (H) | 4–1 | Buchanan, Dixon, McLaughlan, Metcalfe | 4,324 |
| 2 November 1929 | Chesterfield (A) | 0–3 | | 3,956 |
| 9 November 1929 | Lincoln City (H) | 0–0 | | 3,956 |
| 16 November 1929 | Tranmere Rovers (A) | 3–2 | Dixon (3) | 4,880 |
| 23 November 1929 | Halifax Town (H) | 1–0 | Buchanan | 2,568 |
| 14 December 1929 | South Shields (A) | 1–2 | Buchanan | 3,361 |
| 21 December 1929 | Accrington Stanley (H) | 2–1 | Carmedy, McLaughlan | 3,806 |
| 25 December 1929 | Carlisle United (H) | 2–2 | Dixon, Parry | 3,454 |
| 28 December 1929 | Southport (A) | 0–0 | | 1,825 |
| 4 January 1930 | Crewe Alexandra | 1–1 | Hedley | 3,762 |
| 14 January 1930 | Rochdale (H) | 1–0 | Hedley | 1,359 |
| 18 January 1930 | York City (A) | 0–1 | | 5,289 |
| 23 January 1930 | Carlisle United (A) | 2–2 | Carmedy, Parry | 3,960 |
| 25 January 1930 | Stockport County (H) | 1–2 | Manock | 5,217 |
| 1 February 1930 | New Brighton (A) | 1–2 | Buchanan | 3,906 |
| 8 February 1930 | Port Vale (H) | 2–3 | Carmedy, Weedall | 5,045 |
| 15 February 1930 | Barrow (A) | 2–0 | Carmedy, Weedall | 4,916 |
| 22 February 1930 | Hartlepools United (H) | 3–2 | Buchanan, Dixon, Hedley | 2,862 |
| 1 March 1930 | Doncaster Rovers (A) | 0–3 | | 4,445 |
| 8 March 1930 | Chesterfield (H) | 0–2 | | 3,077 |
| 15 March 1930 | Lincoln City (A) | 1–4 | Dixon | 2,057 |
| 22 March 1930 | Tranmere Rovers (H) | 0–1 | | 2,403 |
| 24 March 1930 | Rotherham United (A) | 2–1 | Dixon (2) | 1,831 |
| 29 March 1930 | Halifax Town (A) | 1–1 | Carmedy | 4,185 |
| 5 April 1930 | Rotherham United (H) | 0–1 | | 2,280 |
| 12 April 1930 | Rochdale (A) | 1–4 | Carmedy | 2,621 |
| 18 April 1930 | Wigan Borough (H) | 1–3 | Carmedy | 1,795 |
| 19 April 1930 | South Shields (H) | 0–1 | | 1,553 |
| 21 April 1930 | Wigan Borough (A) | 0–2 | | 3,004 |
| 3 May 1930 | Wrexham (A) | 1–5 | Weedall | 1,926 |

=== Final league position ===
| Pos | Team | Pld | W | D | L | GF | GA | GAv | Pts | Promotion |
|---|---|---|---|---|---|---|---|---|---|---|
| 17 | Wrexham | 42 | 13 | 8 | 21 | 67 | 88 | 0.761 | 34 | |
| 18 | Wigan Borough | 42 | 13 | 7 | 22 | 60 | 88 | 0.682 | 33 | |
| 19 | Nelson | 42 | 13 | 7 | 22 | 51 | 80 | 0.638 | 33 | |
| 20 | Rotherham United | 42 | 11 | 8 | 23 | 67 | 113 | 0.593 | 30 | |
| 21 | Halifax Town | 42 | 10 | 8 | 24 | 44 | 79 | 0.557 | 28 | Re-elected |

Source: rsssf.com

== FA Cup ==
=== Match results ===
| Round | Date | Opponents | Result | Goalscorers | Attendance |
|---|---|---|---|---|---|
| First round | 30 November 1929 | Crewe Alexandra (H) | 0–3 | | 3,000 |

== Player statistics ==
Key to positions

- CF = Centre forward
- FB = Fullback
- GK = Goalkeeper
- HB = Half-back
- IF = Inside forward
- OF = Outside forward

Statistics

| Nat. | Position | Player | Third Division North | | FA Cup | | Total |
| Nat. | Position | Player | Apps | Goals | Apps | Goals | Apps | Goals |
|---|---|---|---|---|---|---|---|---|
| (England) | IF | Joseph Baldwin | 1 | 0 | 0 | 0 | 1 | 0 |
| (England) | GK | Lewis Botto | 1 | 0 | 0 | 0 | 1 | 0 |
| (Scotland) | IF | Jim Buchanan | 34 | 9 | 1 | 0 | 35 | 9 |
| (England) | HB | James Caine | 2 | 0 | 0 | 0 | 2 | 0 |
| (England) | CF | Tom Carmedy | 29 | 10 | 0 | 0 | 29 | 10 |
| (England) | OF | Ralph Chapman | 6 | 0 | 0 | 0 | 6 | 0 |
| (England) | CF | Ernie Dixon | 28 | 10 | 1 | 0 | 29 | 10 |
| (England) | FB | Billy Fairhurst | 40 | 0 | 1 | 0 | 41 | 0 |
| (England) | IF | Robert Ferguson | 1 | 0 | 0 | 0 | 1 | 0 |
| (England) | FB | Ted Ferguson | 31 | 0 | 1 | 0 | 32 | 0 |
| (England) | CF | Fred Ferrari | 7 | 3 | 0 | 0 | 7 | 3 |
| (England) | CF | Bob Gartside | 1 | 0 | 0 | 0 | 1 | 0 |
| (England) | OF | Foster Hedley | 26 | 5 | 1 | 0 | 27 | 5 |
| (England) | FB | Harry Hooper | 8 | 0 | 0 | 0 | 8 | 0 |
| (England) | OF | Gerry Kelly | 9 | 4 | 0 | 0 | 9 | 4 |
| (England) | GK | James Mangham | 1 | 0 | 0 | 0 | 1 | 0 |
| (England) | IF | Edward Manock | 13 | 1 | 0 | 0 | 13 | 1 |
| (Scotland) | HB | Jimmy McKinnell | 10 | 0 | 1 | 0 | 11 | 0 |
| (Scotland) | IF | George McLaughlan | 29 | 2 | 1 | 0 | 30 | 2 |
| (England) | HB | Jim Metcalfe | 30 | 1 | 0 | 0 | 30 | 1 |
| (England) | OF | Frank Parry | 24 | 2 | 1 | 0 | 25 | 2 |
| (England) | FB | Gilbert Richmond | 5 | 0 | 0 | 0 | 5 | 0 |
| (Scotland) | GK | Peter Shevlin | 37 | 0 | 1 | 0 | 38 | 0 |
| (England) | HB | Steve Spargo | 21 | 0 | 1 | 0 | 22 | 0 |
| (Scotland) | HB | David Suttie | 38 | 0 | 1 | 0 | 39 | 0 |
| (England) | HB | Harry Tordoff | 8 | 0 | 0 | 0 | 8 | 0 |
| (England) | GK | Sam Warhurst | 3 | 0 | 0 | 0 | 3 | 0 |
| (England) | OF | John Weedall | 7 | 3 | 0 | 0 | 7 | 3 |
| (England) | HB | George Wilson | 12 | 0 | 0 | 0 | 12 | 0 |

== See also ==
- List of Nelson F.C. seasons
