= 1935–36 Chester F.C. season =

Chester
1935–36 season
- Manager: Charlie Hewitt
- Stadium: Sealand Road
- Football League Third Division North: 2nd
- FA Cup: Second round
- Welsh Cup: Final
- Top goalscorer: League: Paddy Wrightson (27); All: Paddy Wrightson (31)
- Highest home attendance: 16,375 vs Tranmere Rovers (28 March)
- Lowest home attendance: 3,581 vs Gateshead (11 January)
- Average home league attendance: 6,654; 4th in division

The 1935–36 season was the fifth season of competitive association football in the Football League played by Chester, an English club based in Chester, Cheshire.

It was the club's fifth consecutive season in the Third Division North since the election to the Football League. Alongside competing in the league, the club also participated in the FA Cup and the Welsh Cup.

== Football League ==
Pos	Team	Pld	W	D	L	GF	GA	GAv	Pts	Promotion or relegation
1	Chesterfield (C, P)	42	24	12	6	92	39	2.359	60	Promotion to the Second Division
2	Chester	42	22	11	9	100	45	2.222	55	
3	Tranmere Rovers	42	22	11	9	93	58	1.603	55	
4	Lincoln City	42	22	9	11	91	51	1.784	53	
5	Stockport County	42	20	8	14	65	49	1.327	48	

Source: rsssf.com
(C) Champions; (P) Promoted

=== Results summary ===
Overall								Home						Away					
Pld	W	D	L	GF	GA	GAv	Pts	W	D	L	GF	GA	Pts	W	D	L	GF	GA	Pts
42	22	11	9	100	45	2.222	55	14	5	2	69	18	33	8	6	7	31	27	22

Source: rsssf.com

=== Results by matchday ===
Round	1	2	3	4	5	6	7	8	9	10	11	12	13	14	15	16	17	18	19	20	21	22	23	24	25	26	27	28	29	30	31	32	33	34	35	36	37	38	39	40	41	42
Result	W	W	L	W	D	D	W	D	W	L	L	D	D	D	W	W	W	L	D	D	L	L	D	W	D	W	W	W	W	W	W	W	W	L	D	L	W	W	L	W	W	W
Position	7	2	5	2	2	3	3	3	2	2	3	3	3	3	3	2	2	3	3	3	5	5	8	5	5	5	3	3	3	3	3	3	3	3	3	3	3	3	3	3	2	2

Source: Statto.com
W = Win; D = Draw; L = Loss

=== Matches ===
Date	Opponents	Venue	Result	Score	Scorers	Attendance
31 August	Southport	H	W	5–1	Williams (3), Grainger (o.g.), Sargeant	9,444
2 September	Accrington Stanley	A	W	3–0	Williams, Kelly, Wrightson	4,227
7 September	Wrexham	A	L	0–1		24,690
11 September	Accrington Stanley	H	W	4–0	Sargeant (2), Williams, Wrightson	6,521
14 September	Lincoln City	A	D	1–1	Williams	8,051
18 September	Crewe Alexandra	A	D	1–1	Williams	6,976
21 September	Rochdale	H	W	5–2	Wrightson (2), Williams, Cresswell (2)	6,914
25 September	Oldham Athletic	H	D	1–1	Williams	8,205
28 September	York City	A	W	2–1	Williams (2)	4,917
2 October	Crewe Alexandra	H	L	0–1		5,470
5 October	Barrow	H	L	1–2	Williams	5,841
12 October	New Brighton	A	D	3–3	Cresswell, Howarth, Williams	5,065
19 October	Rotherham United	H	D	0–0		5,187
26 October	Mansfield Town	A	D	0–0		5,561
2 November	Hartlepools United	H	W	4–0	Cresswell, Horsman, Hughes, Williams	5,503
9 November	Carlisle United	A	W	3–1	Horsman, Cresswell, Sargeant	8,778
16 November	Walsall	H	W	2–0	Cresswell, Williams	6,429
23 November	Tranmere Rovers	A	L	1–3	Hughes	15,457
7 December	Darlington	A	D	1–1	Hughes	3,906
25 December	Chesterfield	H	D	1–1	Cresswell	7,880
26 December	Chesterfield	A	L	0–1		7,310
28 December	Southport	A	L	1–2	Horsman	3,000
4 January	Wrexham	H	D	1–1	Sargeant	10,511
11 January	Gateshead	H	W	4–0	Kelly (3), Cresswell	3,581
25 January	Rochdale	A	D	1–1	Cresswell (pen.)	4,420
1 February	York City	H	W	12–0	Sargeant (4), Wrightson (4), Cresswell (2), Horsman (2)	3,775
8 February	Barrow	A	W	4–2	Wrightson (3), Cresswell	2,930
15 February	New Brighton	H	W	8–2	Wrightson (3), Cresswell (2, 1pen.), Hughes (2), Horsman	4,860
22 February	Rotherham United	A	W	2–1	Wrightson (2)	5,300
25 February	Oldham Athletic	A	W	3–1	Wrightson, Hughes, Sargeant	3,361
29 February	Carlisle United	H	W	3–2	Wrightson, Horsman, Cresswell	3,675
7 March	Hartlepools United	A	W	2–0	Wrightson (2)	4,167
14 March	Mansfield Town	H	W	4–0	Kelly (2), Wrightson (2)	5,533
21 March	Walsall	A	L	0–1		5,489
28 March	Tranmere Rovers	H	D	1–1	Horsman	16,375
4 April	Gateshead	A	L	0–2		3,639
10 April	Stockport County	H	W	2–0	Wrightson (2)	10,500
11 April	Darlington	H	W	4–1	Coulthard (o.g.), Wrightson (2), Kelly	4,829
13 April	Stockport County	A	L	0–2		6,750
18 April	Halifax Town	A	W	3–2	Wharton (2), Sargeant	5,932
22 April	Lincoln City	H	W	4–2	Wharton (2), Horsman (2)	4,726
29 April	Halifax Town	H	W	3–1	Wrightson, Wharton, Wilson	3,976

== FA Cup ==
Round	Date	Opponents	Venue	Result	Score	Scorers	Attendance
First round	30 November	Gateshead (3N)	H	W	1–0	Cresswell	6,200
Second round	14 December	Reading (3S)	H	D	3–3	Cresswell (2), Wrightson	13,000
Second round replay	18 December	Reading (3S)	A	L	0–3		10,152

== Welsh Cup ==
Round	Date	Opponents	Venue	Result	Score	Scorers	Attendance
Seventh round	12 February	Southport (3N)	H	W	2–1	Wrightson, Horsman	2,000
Quarterfinal	11 March	Swansea Town (2)	H	W	4–1	Wrightson (2), Cresswell, Kelly	5,500
Semifinal	16 April	Rhyl Athletic (B&DL)	A	W	3–0	Wharton (3)	
Final	30 April	Crewe Alexandra (3N)	N	L	0–2		7,000

== Season statistics ==
Nat	Player	Total		League		FA Cup		Welsh Cup	
Nat	Player	A	G	A	G	A	G	A	G
Goalkeepers
(Republic of Ireland)	Johnny Burke	40	–	35	–	2	–	3	–
(Scotland)	Robert Middleton	9	–	7	–	1	–	1	–
Field players
(England)	Ted Anderson	17	–	16	–	–	–	1	–
(England)	Fred Bennett	5	–	5	–	–	–	–	–
(England)	Frank Cresswell	37	19	32	15	3	3	2	1
	Ted Common	43	–	36	–	3	–	4	–
	Jack Davies	2	–	2	–	–	–	–	–
	Ernie Hall	47	–	41	–	3	–	3	–
(England)	Bill Horsman	41	11	34	10	3	–	4	1
	Harold Howarth	47	1	42	1	1	–	4	–
	Jack Hughes	32	6	28	6	2	–	2	–
(England)	Gerry Kelly	15	8	14	7	–	–	1	1
	John Pitcairn	25	–	20	–	3	–	2	–
	Bill Rowley	2	–	1	–	–	–	1	–
	Bob Sanders	8	–	6	–	–	–	2	–
	Harry Skitt	1	–	–	–	1	–	–	–
	Charlie Sargeant	44	11	38	11	3	–	3	–
	Guy Wharton	16	8	12	5	1	–	3	3
(Wales)	Ronnie Williams	26	15	24	15	2	–	–	–
(England)	Arthur Wilson	47	1	40	1	3	–	4	–
(England)	Paddy Wrightson	35	31	29	27	2	1	4	3
	Own goals	–	2	–	2	–	–	–	–
	Total	49	113	42	100	3	4	4	9
