= 1934–35 Chester F.C. season =

Chester
1934–35 season
- Manager: Charlie Hewitt
- Stadium: Sealand Road
- Football League Third Division North: 3rd
- FA Cup: Third round
- Welsh Cup: Final
- Top goalscorer: League: John Wallbanks (24); All: John Wallbanks (29)
- Highest home attendance: 15,106 vs Wrexham (29 September)
- Lowest home attendance: 3,004 vs Rochdale (3 April)
- Average home league attendance: 6,967; 5th in division

The 1934–35 season was the fourth season of competitive association football in the Football League played by Chester, an English club based in Chester, Cheshire.

It was the club's fourth consecutive season in the Third Division North since the election to the Football League. Alongside competing in the league, the club also participated in the FA Cup and the Welsh Cup.

== Football League ==
Pos	Team	Pld	HW	HD	HL	HGF	HGA	AW	AD	AL	AGF	AGA	GAv	Pts	Promotion
1	Doncaster Rovers	42	16	0	5	53	21	10	5	6	34	23	1.977	57	Division Champions, promoted
2	Halifax Town	42	17	2	2	50	24	8	3	10	26	43	1.134	55	
3	Chester	42	14	4	3	62	27	6	10	5	29	31	1.569	54	
4	Lincoln City	42	14	3	4	55	21	8	4	9	32	37	1.500	51	
5	Darlington	42	15	5	1	50	15	6	4	11	30	44	1.356	51	

Source: rsssf.com

=== Results summary ===
Overall								Home						Away					
Pld	W	D	L	GF	GA	GAv	Pts	W	D	L	GF	GA	Pts	W	D	L	GF	GA	Pts
42	20	14	8	91	58	1.569	54	14	4	3	62	27	32	6	10	5	29	31	22

Source: rsssf.com

=== Results by matchday ===
Round	1	2	3	4	5	6	7	8	9	10	11	12	13	14	15	16	17	18	19	20	21	22	23	24	25	26	27	28	29	30	31	32	33	34	35	36	37	38	39	40	41	42
Result	W	W	W	W	L	W	W	W	L	L	L	W	D	D	D	W	D	D	W	W	D	D	D	W	W	D	W	D	D	L	W	L	W	W	W	W	L	W	D	D	D	L
Position	6	2	1	1	2	2	1	1	2	4	6	5	5	4	3	3	4	3	3	3	3	2	3	3	2	2	2	2	3	3	3	3	3	3	3	1	3	2	1	2	2	2

Source: Statto.com
W = Win; D = Draw; L = Loss

=== Matches ===
Date	Opponents	Venue	Result	Score	Scorers	Attendance
25 August	Gateshead	A	W	4–2	Sargeant (2), Whittam (2)	6,532
29 August	Hartlepools United	A	W	2–0	Hughes (2)	5,496
1 September	Accrington Stanley	H	W	4–0	Wallbanks, Cresswell (2), Hughes	8,932
5 September	Hartlepools United	H	W	4–1	Cresswell (3), Wallbanks	8,979
8 September	Darlington	A	L	0–1		6,991
15 September	York City	H	W	5–1	Hughes (2, 1pen.), Whittam, Wallbanks (2)	8,592
22 September	New Brighton	A	W	2–0	Wallbanks, Hughes	5,249
29 September	Wrexham	H	W	6–2	Wallbanks (4), Cresswell (2)	15,106
6 October	Southport	H	L	0–2		5,564
13 October	Doncaster Rovers	A	L	0–3		10,576
20 October	Halifax Town	A	L	0–1		14,488
27 October	Rotherham United	H	W	4–1	Whittam (2), Sargeant, Wallbanks	5,889
3 November	Walsall	A	D	1–1	Kelly	6,721
10 November	Chesterfield	H	D	1–1	Hughes	6,230
17 November	Mansfield Town	A	D	1–1	Wallbanks	6,402
1 December	Carlisle United	A	W	3–1	Wallbanks (3)	3,711
15 December	Lincoln City	A	D	0–0		4,394
22 December	Tranmere Rovers	H	D	0–0		11,217
25 December	Stockport County	H	W	5–1	Cresswell, Wallbanks (3), Kelly	7,686
26 December	Stockport County	A	W	1–0	Wallbanks	10,973
29 December	Gateshead	H	D	2–2	Wallbanks (2)	5,419
1 January	Tranmere Rovers	A	D	1–1	Cresswell	13,054
5 January	Accrington Stanley	A	D	1–1	Whittam	3,733
16 January	Barrow	H	W	6–2	Sargeant (2), Wallbanks (2), Cresswell, Whittam	3,155
19 January	Darlington	H	W	3–1	Cresswell (2), Mantle	6,892
26 January	York City	A	D	1–1	Mantle	2,456
2 February	New Brighton	H	W	5–4	Kelly (3), Hughes, Wilson (pen.)	6,608
9 February	Wrexham	A	D	2–2	Wallbanks, Cresswell	18,233
16 February	Southport	A	D	1–1	Wallbanks	1,636
23 February	Doncaster Rovers	H	L	1–3	Whittam	9,685
2 March	Halifax Town	H	W	5–0	Taylor (o.g.), Cresswell (2), Mantle, Whittam	5,770
9 March	Rotherham United	A	L	1–6	Sargeant	8,182
16 March	Walsall	H	W	2–1	Kelly, Simms	4,607
23 March	Chesterfield	A	W	2–1	Kelly, Kilcar	3,479
30 March	Mansfield Town	H	W	3–2	Kilcar (3)	5,160
3 April	Rochdale	H	W	1–0	Wilson (pen.)	3,004
6 April	Barrow	A	L	2–4	Mantle (2)	3,544
13 April	Carlisle United	H	W	3–0	Sargeant, Henderson (o.g.), Mantle	3,986
19 April	Crewe Alexandra	H	D	2–2	Mantle, Kelly	10,027
20 April	Rochdale	A	D	3–3	Mantle (3)	6,933
22 April	Crewe Alexandra	A	D	1–1	Mantle	7,761
27 April	Lincoln City	H	L	0–1		3,733

== FA Cup ==
Round	Date	Opponents	Venue	Result	Score	Scorers	Attendance
First round	24 November	Dinnington Athletic (SAL)	H	W	3–1	Whittam, Kelly, Wallbanks	6,000
Second round	8 December	Clapton Orient (3S)	A	W	3–1	Cresswell, Kelly, Wallbanks	12,350
Third round	12 January	Nottingham Forest (2)	H	L	0–4		13,127

== Welsh Cup ==
Round	Date	Opponents	Venue	Result	Score	Scorers	Attendance
Sixth round	13 February	Bangor City (B&DL)	H	W	5–1	Wallbanks (3), Kelly, Pitcairn	1,000
Quarterfinal	27 March	Cardiff City (3S)	A	D	2–2	Mantle (2)	
Quarterfinal replay	10 April	Cardiff City (3S)	H	W	3–0	Sargeant (2), Mantle	3,000
Semifinal	24 April	Swansea Town (2)	N	W	5–0	Sargeant, Cresswell, Mantle, Hughes, Kelly	5,300
Final	4 May	Tranmere Rovers (3N)	H	L	0–1		10,000

== Season statistics ==
Nat	Player	Total		League		FA Cup		Welsh Cup	
Nat	Player	A	G	A	G	A	G	A	G
Goalkeepers
(Republic of Ireland)	Johnny Burke	16	–	12	–	–	–	4	–
(Scotland)	Robert Middleton	34	–	30	–	3	–	1	–
Field players
	Billy Bell	15	–	12	–	2	–	1	–
(England)	Fred Bennett	45	–	37	–	3	–	5	–
(England)	Frank Cresswell	46	17	39	15	3	1	4	1
	John Fantham	16	–	15	–	1	–	–	–
	Ernie Hall	41	–	34	–	3	–	4	–
	Harold Howarth	19	–	15	–	–	–	4	–
	Jack Hughes	42	9	35	8	2	–	5	1
(England)	Gerry Kelly	32	12	25	8	2	2	5	2
(Scotland)	Steve Kilcar	4	4	3	4	–	–	1	–
	Jack Little	13	–	12	–	–	–	1	–
(England)	Joe Mantle	21	15	17	11	–	–	4	4
	John Pitcairn	50	1	42	–	3	–	5	1
	Bill Rowley	1	–	1	–	–	–	–	–
	Charlie Sargeant	49	10	41	7	3	–	5	3
(England)	Bill Sheppard	1	–	1	–	–	–	–	–
	Hedley Simms	1	1	1	1	–	–	–	–
(Wales)	Fred Smallwood	1	–	1	–	–	–	–	–
(England)	John Wallbanks	31	29	27	24	3	2	1	3
	Ernie Whittam	22	10	20	9	2	1	–	–
(England)	Arthur Wilson	50	2	42	2	3	–	5	–
	Own goals	–	2	–	2	–	–	–	–
	Total	50	112	42	91	3	6	5	15
