= Wallbank (surname) =

Wallbank is a topographical surname of British origin, which was in use in Lancashire by the 13th century, and meant a person who lived by the bank of a stream or river. Alternative spellings including de Wallbank, Walbank, Walbanks, and Wallbanks. The name may refer to:

- Allan Wallbank (born 1937), New Zealand politician
- F. W. Walbank (1909–2008), British historian
- Fred Wallbanks (1908–1948), English footballer
- Harry Wallbanks (1921–1993), English footballer
- Horace Wallbanks (1918–2004), English footballer
- John Wallbanks (1905–1987), English footballer
- Matthew W. Walbank (1824–1874), Canadian politician
- Newell Smith Wallbank (1875–1945), British composer
- Paul Wallbank (born 1962), Australian writer
- Phyllis Wallbank (born 1918), British educator
- T. Walter Wallbank (1901–1992), American historian
- Tommy Wallbank (born 2005), Maltese long-distance runner
