= Bill Harvey (footballer, born 1908) =

English footballer (1908–1978)

Personal information
- Full name: William Arthur Harvey
- Date of birth: 2 May 1908
- Place of birth: Chopwell, England
- Date of death: 1978 (aged 69–70)
- Place of death: Wakefield, England
- Height: 5 ft 9 1/2 in (1.77 m)
- Position: Forward

Senior career*
Years	Team	Apps	(Gls)
–	Chopwell Institute		
–	Annfield Plain		
1929–1932	Barnsley	42	(12)
193?–1935	Eden Colliery Welfare		
1935–1937	Chesterfield	14	(4)
1937–1938	Boston United	28	(14)
1938–1939	Darlington	14	(7)
1939	Stockton		
- * Club domestic league appearances and goals

William Arthur Harvey (2 May 1908 – 1978) was an English footballer who played as a forward. He scored 23 goals from 70 appearances in the Football League for Barnsley, Chesterfield and Darlington. He also played for a variety of non-league clubs, mainly in the north-east of England. These included Chopwell Institute, Annfield Plain, Eden Colliery Welfare, Boston United, and Stockton.

== Personal life ==
Harvey was born in Chopwell, County Durham, to Michael Harvey, a coal miner, and his wife Esther. At the time of the 1911 Census, the family were living in Blackhall Mill, Chopwell, and the two-year-old Willie was the youngest of six surviving children. In 1931, he married Sarah, sister of his Barnsley teammate John Wallbanks.

He was one of many footballers refused unemployment benefit after football was classified as a seasonal occupation; those normally employed in seasonal work were ineligible for benefit unless they had worked during their off-season. Harvey's brothers-in-law Fred and Jimmy Wallbanks faced the same predicament.

Harvey died in Wakefield, Yorkshire, in 1978 at the age of 70.

== Football career ==
Harvey began his football career with hometown club Chopwell Institute. His performances earned him selection for Durham in inter-county amateur competition in 1927. While on the books of his next club, Annfield Plain of the North-Eastern League, he was selected for the Rest of the League team for the annual match against the reigning champions. He scored 23 league goals in the 1928–29 season before, in March 1929, making his first move into the Football League with Second Division club Barnsley.

He scored 12 goals from 42 league appearances, the last of which came in the 1931–32 season. He played more often for Barnsley's reserve team in the Midland League, and in a match against Wombwell in March 1932, suffered a fractured skull. He was given a free transfer at the end of the season, and returned to his home town.

Harvey dropped out of league football for some time. When he returned, signing for Chesterfield in May 1935, he was reported to have scored 40 goals since Christmas for Eden Colliery Welfare in the North-Eastern League. He spent the season as backup to Maurice Dando, contributing 4 goals – a hat-trick in a 5–0 defeat of Wrexham and the only goal of the home fixture against Lincoln City – from 14 league matches as Chesterfield won the Third Division Northern Section title. For the reserves, he scored at least 26 goals in Midland League competition. For the new season at the higher level, Chesterfield brought in Walter Ponting to play at centre-forward, and Harvey spent the whole season in the reserves, for whom he scored at least 34 goals. Although he was available for transfer, no league club were prepared to meet the fee, so he again dropped out of the Football League, joining Midland League club Boston United for 1937–38.

He had scored nine times against that club for Chesterfield's reserves in the previous two seasons, including five in a 7–1 win in March 1936. With Wilf Notley established at centre forward, Boston used Harvey either at inside forward or at outside right, from which position he reportedly missed shooting chances because of his unwillingness to cut inside; nevertheless, he produced 14 goals from 28 Midland League matches. He contributed the ninth goal to Boston's biggest FA Cup win, by 10 goals to nil against Bilsthorpe Colliery in the Preliminary Round. Boston re-signed him for 1938–39, but in August 1938 he returned once more to the Football League with Darlington.

He made a goalscoring debut in the Football League Jubilee Fund match against local rivals Hartlepools United, but Tom Feeney was preferred when the league season started. Darlington did not select him at centre forward until mid-October, moving Feeney to right half; Harvey marked the occasion by scoring twice away to Hull City, but his club lost 3–2. He kept his position for the 3–1 win against Lincoln City, in which he was fouled for a penalty kick converted by Mike Boyle and then scored the third goal himself. By the end of the season, Harvey had played only 14 times in the league, and scored 7 goals; in all matches, including cup competitions and the North-Eastern League team, he contributed 36 goals. He began the 1939–40 season with Stockton, newly elected to the North-Eastern League, just before league football was suspended for the duration of the Second World War.
