= Fred Wallbanks =

English footballer (1908-1938)

Personal information
- Full name: Frederick Wallbanks
- Date of birth: 14 May 1908
- Place of birth: Platt Bridge, England
- Date of death: 25 April 1938 (aged 29)
- Place of death: Consett, England
- Height: 5 ft 10 in (1.78 m)
- Positions: Left back; outside left

Senior career*
Years	Team	Apps	(Gls)
- Crook Town
- Consett
- Annfield Plain
1928–1930	Bury	0	(0)
1930–1931	Chesterfield	6	(3)
1931–1932	Scarborough		
1932–1934	Bradford City	15	(0)
1934–1935	West Ham United	0	(0)
1935–1936	Nottingham Forest	8	(0)
1936–1937	Northampton Town	0	(0)
1937–1938	Consett		
- * Club domestic league appearances and goals

Frederick Wallbanks (14 May 1908 – 25 April 1938) was an English footballer who made 29 appearances in the Football League playing for Chesterfield, Bradford City and Nottingham Forest in the 1930s. He played as a forward in the earlier part of his career and was later converted to left back.

He was on the books of Bury but played no first-team football, and played Cup matches for West Ham United and Northampton Town but no League football. He also played non-League football for Crook Town, Scarborough, Bradford City and Consett.

== Life and career ==
Wallbanks was born in 1908 in Platt Bridge, Lancashire, a son of Joseph Henry Wallbanks, a collier, and his wife Mary Alice née Glazebrook. By the time of the 1911 Census, the family had moved to Chopwell, County Durham. Four of Wallbanks' brothers, Jack, Jimmy, Horace and Harry, also played League football, as did Bill Harvey, who was raised with the Wallbanks family.

Wallbanks played as a forward for Crook Town, Consett and Annfield Plain before signing as a professional with Football League First Division club Bury in November 1928. He played for Bury's reserves, not just as a forward but also at left half, and was re-signed for the 1929–30 season. He played in "practically all" Bury's Central League matches, but was unable to break through to the first team, and moved on to Chesterfield in June 1930. With Jack Lee – scorer of five goals from the first four matches – injured, Wallbanks came into the team for a spectacular Football League debut on 13 September: a goal down after five minutes at home to Rotherham United, he scored twice in the next eleven minutes to maintain his side's unbeaten record. Wallbanks kept his place for two more matches, and played in just three more matches in the rest of the season. He scored once more, in a 1–1 draw away to Lincoln City, who finished the season one point below Chesterfield at the top of the Third Division North.

Having spent much of his season playing in the Midland League for Chesterfield's reserves, Wallbanks joined a Midland League club, Scarborough, for 1931–32. For the first time, he was a regular in the first eleven, and finished as the team's top scorer with 34 goals. He was leading scorer in the Midland League for much of the season, but was out with injury towards the end and was overtaken by Lindon Medley of Bradford City Reserves. At the end of the season, Wallbanks and his brother Jimmy were two of many footballers refused unemployment benefit after football was classified as a seasonal occupation; claimants normally employed in seasonal work were ineligible for benefit unless they had also worked during their off-season.

His performances earned him a return to the Football League with Bradford City. He rarely appeared for his first two seasons with the Second Division side, where he was converted to play at left back. In "an effort to strengthen the defence", Wallbanks came into the side at left back in place of Robert Hamilton for the third match of the 1934–35 season. Bradford City won, and he retained the position for a couple of months, until Charlie McDermott was preferred. Wallbanks signed for another Second Division club, West Ham United, in December 1934. but played only once, standing in at right half as West Ham were eliminated from the 1934–35 FA Cup by Stockport County, before moving on to Nottingham Forest at the end of the season. Although he had a run of six matches early in the season, he played only twice for the first team thereafter, and was transfer-listed at the end of the season. He spent the 1936–37 season with Northampton Town of the Third Division South, but appeared only once, in the Third Division South Cup.

Wallbanks returned to the north-east, where Blyth Spartans wanted to sign him and his brother Jack, but both signed instead for Consett, newly readmitted to the North-Eastern League, because the club was able to provide both with jobs. The following April, Wallbanks died in an accident at the foundry where he worked.
