= Harry Wallbanks =

English footballer

Personal information
- Full name: Harold Wallbanks
- Date of birth: 27 July 1921
- Place of birth: Chopwell, England
- Date of death: April 1993 (aged 71)
- Place of death: Whitehaven, England
- Position: Right half

Senior career*
Years	Team	Apps	(Gls)
–1938	Chopwell Colliery		
1938–1949	Fulham	33	(1)
1944–1945	→ Sunderland (guest)	21	(0)
1949–1952	Southend United	39	(2)
1952–1953	Workington	26	(9)
- * Club domestic league appearances and goals

Harold Wallbanks (27 July 1921 – April 1993), sometimes known as Choppy Wallbanks, was an English professional footballer who played as a right half in the Football League for Fulham, Southend United and Workington. He played as a guest for Sunderland during the Second World War.

== Personal life ==
Wallbanks' brothers Fred, John, Horace and Jimmy also became footballers. He worked as a miner in Northumberland during the Second World War.
