= List of Bath City F.C. managers =

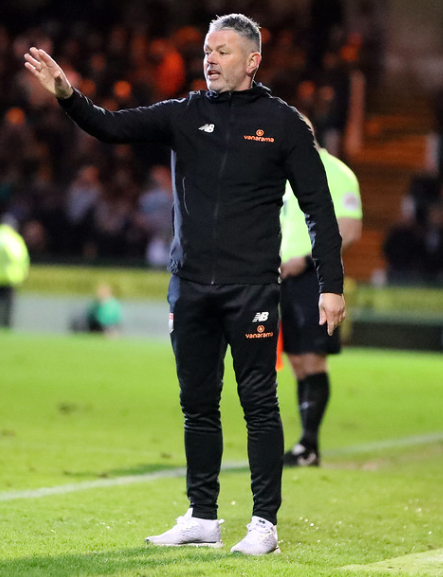
Most recent manager, Jerry Gill, was head coach between 2017 and 2024

Bath City Football Club is a semi-professional football club based in Bath, Somerset, England. The club is affiliated to the Somerset FA and currently competes in the National League South, the sixth tier of English football. Nicknamed the "Romans", the club was founded in 1889 as Bath AFC, and changed its name to Bath City in 1905. Bath City came Southern League runners up in 1930, and again in 1933. The club was discussed for entry into the Football League Third Division during the 1930s, though Bath has missed out on election to the Football League on multiple occasions, including 1935, 1978 and 1985.

Bath have won three Southern League titles (1959–60, 1977–78, 2006–07); one Southern League Cup (1978–79) and one wartime Football League North (1943–44). The list shows the clubs 40 managers from 1907 onwards, not including those who held the role of 'caretaker'. Only Ted Davis, Charles pinker and Gary Owers have managed the club on two occasions. The longest serving manager was Ted Davis from 1927–1937 and then 1939–1945, for a total of 15 years.

== List of managers ==
Information correct as of 22 March 2026. Only competitive matches are counted.

Caretaker managers are not included.

List of Bath City F.C. managers
Name	Image	Nationality	From	To	Games	W	D	L	GF	GA	Win%	Honours (Note: Only mulit-county trophies are counted.)	Notes
Ben Hargett		England	1 September 1908	1 November 1909	46	13	13	20	86	96	28%	–	
Charles Pinker		England	1 November 1909	23 July 1921	250	134	41	75	544	378	54%	–	
Billy Tout		England	23 July 1921	7 November 1923	94	34	15	45	129	163	36%	–	
Charles Pinker		England	1 August 1925	31 June 1927	93	23	17	53	137	236	25%	–	
Ted Davis		England	31 June 1927	1 May 1937	538	253	98	187	1181	971	47%	–	
Arthur Greaves		England	1 August 1937	5 May 1938	58	16	13	29	79	123	28%	–	
Alex Raisbeck		Scotland	29 June 1938	20 April 1940	73	23	20	30	102	144	32%	–	
Ted Davis		England	May 1940	June 1945	152	–						Football League North champions 1943–44	
Arthur Mortimer		England	20 August 1945	1 July 1947	77	28	10	39	167	192	35%	–	
Vic Woodley		England	1 July 1947	9 December 1949	109	38	20	51	180	210	35%	–	
Eddie Hapgood		England	15 March 1950	13 February 1956	313	131	66	116	535	505	42%	–	
Paddy Sloan		Ireland	1 July 1956	2 May 1957	53	20	10	23	81	102	38%	–	
Bob Hewison		England	2 May 1957	6 May 1961	218	112	38	68	488	326	51%	Southern League champions 1959–60	
Arthur Cole		England	May 1961	January 1963	71	34	11	26	137	119	48%	–	
Malcolm Allison		England	March 1963	May 1964	71	38	15	18	135	85	54%	–	
Ivor Powell		Wales	July 1964	January 1967	160	67	32	61	276	248	42%	–	
Arnold Rodgers		England	February 1967	6 June 1970	217	106	49	62	418	279	49%	–	
Johnny Petts		England	30 June 1970	14 September 1971	65	23	16	26	75	102	35%	–	
Joe O'Neil		England	11 December 1971	3 May 1972	25	5	3	17	24	54	20%	–	
Dave Burnside		England	3 May 1972	17 January 1973	41	13	9	19	54	63	32%	–	
Roy Bence		England	17 January 1973	11 October 1973	41	19	8	14	57	49	46%	–	
Geoff Cox		England	11 October 1973	7 December 1973	13	7	3	3	12	11	54%	–	
Bert Head		England	12 December 1973	16 October 1975	141	64	32	45	230	165	45%	–	
Jack Smith		England	16 October 1975	14 May 1976	49	20	14	15	78	62	41%	–	
Brian Godfrey		Wales	15 May 1976	13 January 1979	157	79	49	29	255	152	50%	Southern League champions 1977–78 Southern League Cup winners 1978–79	
Micky Burns		England	13 January 1979	19 June 1979	34	17	12	5	46	27	50%	–	
Bob Boyd		England	20 June 1979	26 March 1980	42	14	10	18	57	71	33%	–	
Stuart Taylor		England	1 July 1980	23 April 1982	110	48	29	33	168	124	44%	–	
Bobby Jones		England	23 April 1982	17 March 1988	330	130	80	120	459	440	39%	–	
Harold Jarman		England	1 July 1988	6 October 1988	13	5	4	4	20	18	38%	–	
Les Alderman		Scotland	9 October 1988	19 February 1989	32	11	10	11	58	43	34%	–	
Jeff Evans		England	February 1989	June 1989	16	9	3	4	30	13	56%	–	
George Rooney		Scotland	16 May 1989	11 March 1991	105	54	21	30	197	125	51%	–	
Tony Ricketts		England	11 March 1991	14 July 1996	287	110	79	98	391	354	38%	–	
Steve Millard		Scotland	14 July 1996	1 April 1998	100	39	27	34	162	161	39%	–	
Paul Bodin		Wales	23 April 1998	8 May 2001	170	76	46	48	292	218	45%	–	
Alan Pridham		England	20 May 2001	12 November 2003	119	38	32	49	162	188	32%	–	
Gary Owers		England	26 November 2003	25 May 2005	84	38	18	28	116	94	45%	–	
John Relish		England	14 June 2005	14 October 2008	180	95	45	40	292	152	53%	Southern League champions 2006–07	
Addie Britton		England	14 October 2008	12 October 2012	206	78	46	82	286	295	38%	–	
Lee Howells		England	12 October 2012	18 January 2016	172	70	41	61	258	233	41%	–	
Gary Owers		England	4 February 2016	13 September 2017	78	33	18	27	122	98	42%	–	
Jerry Gill		England	5 October 2017	18 November 2024	335	144	76	115	475	397	43%	–	
Darren Way		England	23 December 2024	22 March 2026	68	19	22	27	82	83	28%	–	
