= Tom Carmedy =

English footballer (1904–1985)

Personal information
- Full name: Thomas Owen Carmedy
- Date of birth: 23 June 1904
- Place of birth: Gainford, England
- Date of death: January 1985 (aged 80)
- Place of death: Weybridge, England
- Position: Centre forward

Senior career*
Years	Team	Apps	(Gls)
19??–1927	Gainford		
1927	Darlington	1	(0)
1927	Cockfield		
1927–1928	Bishop Auckland		
1928–1931	Nelson	66	(20)
1931–1932	Barrow	7	(0)
1932–1933	Boston Town		
1933–19??	Northwood United		
- * Club domestic league appearances and goals

Tom Carmedy (23 June 1904 – January 1985) was an English professional footballer who played predominantly as a centre forward. He began his career in local-league football with his hometown club, Gainford, before joining Football League side Darlington in 1927. He later played for Nelson and Barrow, before returning to non-League football.

== Biography ==
Thomas Owen Carmedy was born to a Roman Catholic family in Gainford, County Durham on 23 June 1904. Following his retirement from football, he lived in the south of England was employed in a tailor's shop. Carmedy died in Weybridge, Surrey, in January 1985 at the age of 80.

== Playing career ==
=== Early career ===
Carmedy started his footballing career with his local club, Gainford. In March 1927, he signed for Football League Second Division side Darlington as an amateur player. Following the team's relegation to the Third Division North at the end of the 1926–27 campaign, Carmedy made his debut for Darlington on 31 August 1927 in the 1–0 win against Bradford City. However, he did not make another appearance for the club, and in November 1927, he returned to non-League football with Cockfield. Shortly afterwards, he moved to Bishop Auckland, where he remained until midway through the 1928–29 season.

=== Nelson ===
Carmedy was signed by Third Division North outfit Nelson in December 1928, initially on amateur terms. The following month, he was awarded a professional contract and made his debut for the club on 19 January 1929, scoring in the 1–1 draw with Southport at Seedhill. He then spent several matches out of the side, before making a return to play three matches as an outside forward in place of the unavailable Harry Ridley. In April 1929, he scored in consecutive matches against Halifax Town and Lincoln City, meaning that he ended the season with a total of three goals in eight appearances for his new club.

In the 1929–30 campaign, Carmedy became more of a first-team player at Nelson, especially after new signing Fred Ferrari fell out of favour with the directors despite scoring three goals in his opening seven matches for the club. On his fourth appearance of the season, Carmedy netted a hat-trick in the 4–0 home win over Wrexham. He enjoyed a sustained run at centre forward between December 1929 and February 1930, during which time he scored a further four goals. Towards the end of the season, he shared centre forward duties with new arrival Ernie Dixon, who had arrived from Huddersfield Town for a fee of £300. Carmedy ended the campaign with 10 goals in 29 league matches as the team finished 19th in the league.

The following season was a disappointing one for Nelson, as they finished bottom of the Third Division North and failed in their bid for re-election in the summer of 1931. In one the side's few victories, Carmedy scored the second hat-trick of his professional career in the 4–2 win against Accrington Stanley. The majority of Carmedy's appearances during the 1930–31 campaign were made at outside-right, and subsequently he scored fewer goals than he had in the previous season, scoring a total of 7 in 29 games. In March 1931, he was forced to play as a goalkeeper during a reserve match against Lancaster Town. In snowy conditions, he conceded four goals, although a match report in a local newspaper claimed that his performance was "nothing short of remarkable".

=== Return to non-league ===
Most of the Nelson players departed the club following their relegation to the Lancashire Combination in 1931. Carmedy stayed in the Third Division North, signing a deal with Barrow. During a solitary season at Holker Street, he made seven first-team appearances but failed to get on the scoresheet for the club. In October 1932, he returned to non-league football, joining Boston Town on a free transfer. He spent a year with the side, before moving to Northwood United, where he ended his career, in November 1933.
