= Jimmy Wallbanks =

English footballer

Personal information
- Full name: James Wallbanks
- Date of birth: 12 September 1909
- Place of birth: Wigan, England
- Date of death: 28 October 1979 (aged 70)
- Place of death: Reading, England
- Height: 5 ft 9 in (1.75 m)
- Positions: Half back; right back

Senior career*
Years	Team	Apps	(Gls)
–1929	Annfield Plain		
1929–1931	Barnsley	9	(0)
1931–1932	Norwich City	3	(0)
1932–	Northampton Town	2	(0)
- Chopwell Institute
–1934	Wigan Athletic		
1934–1938	Millwall	88	(0)
1938–1947	Reading	48	(1)
- Ramsgate Athletic

Managerial career
- Ramsgate Athletic (player-manager)
- 1971: Reading (caretaker)
- * Club domestic league appearances and goals

James Wallbanks (12 September 1909 – 28 October 1979) was an English professional footballer who played as a half back and right back in the Football League for Millwall, Reading, Barnsley, Norwich City and Northampton Town. After retiring as a player, he served Reading as trainer and physiotherapist for 22 years and took caretaker charge of the club in 1971.

== Personal life ==
Wallbanks' brothers Fred, John, Horace and Harry also became footballers.

== Honours ==
- Reading Hall of Fame
