= Joshua Atkinson =

Joshua Atkinson may refer to:

- Josh Atkinson (1902–1983), English footballer
- Joshua Atkinson (born 2003), Thai sprinter and middle-distance runner
- Joshua Atkins (born 1992), New Zealand professional racing cyclist
