= Manock =

Manock, also spelled Mannock, is a surname. It may refer to:

- Edward Manock (1904 – 1908), English professional footballer
- Jerry Manock, American industrial designer and product designer for Apple Inc.
- Kitty Mannock, a fictional character created by novelist Clive Cussler
- Mannock Baronets, a Baronetage of England title
- Mick Mannock (1887 – 1918), British World War I flying ace
