= Ralph Chapman =

Ralph Chapman may refer to:

- Ralph Chapman (American football) (1892–1969), American football player
- Ralph Chapman (footballer) (1906–1999), English footballer
- Ralph Chapman (politician) (born 1951), member of the Maine House of Representatives
- Ralph Chapman (paleontologist), employed by Victoria University of Wellington
