= 1931–32 Welsh Cup =

Tournament details
- Country: Wales
- Teams: 52

Final positions
- Champions: (Wales) Swansea City
- Runners-up: (Wales) Wrexham

Tournament statistics
- Matches played: 63
- Goals scored: 314 (4.98 per match)

The 1931–32 FAW Welsh Cup is the 51st season of the annual knockout tournament for competitive football teams in Wales.

== Key ==
League name pointed after clubs name.

- CCL - Cheshire County League
- FL D2 - Football League Second Division
- FL D3N - Football League Third Division North
- FL D3S - Football League Third Division South
- MWL - Mid-Wales Football League
- SFL - Southern Football League
- WLN - Welsh League North
- WLS D1 - Welsh League South Division One
- WLS D2 - Welsh League South Division Two
- W&DL - Wrexham & District Amateur League

== First round ==
Tie no	Home	Score	Away
1	'Bangor City	w/o	Llandudno (WLN)
2	Holyhead Town	2–2	Llanfairfechan
replay	Llanfairfechan	1–3	Holyhead Town
3	Penmaenmawr	w/o	Bethesda Victoria
4	Vron United (W&DL)	3–9	Cross Street Gwersyllt (W&DL)
5	Holywell Arcadians (WLN)	6–0	Mold Amateurs
6	Caersws	2–6	Machynlleth (MWL)
7	Aberdovey	0–1	Dolgelley
8	Aberystwyth University College (MWL)	0–6	Aberystwyth Town (MWL)
9	Llanidloes Town (MWL)	11–2	Rhayader
10	Builth Wells (MWL)	1–2	Llandrindod North End (MWL)
11	Newtown (MWL)	3–2	Welshpool (MWL)
12	Rhosrobin (W&DL)	4–1	Gwersyllt (W&DL)
13	Gyfelia	w/o	Druids (W&DL)
14	Oakenholt	1–2	Mold Alexandra
15	Bettisfield (WLN)	2–2	Flint Amateurs
replay	Flint Amateurs	2–3	Bettisfield (WLN)
16	Catholic OB Connahs Quay	4–7	Sandycroft

== Second round ==
15 winners from the First round and one new club - Llanerch Celts. Bettisfield get a bye to the Third round.

Tie no	Home	Score	Away
1	Bangor City	6–3	Holyhead Town
2	Holywell Arcadians (WLN)	6–0	Bethesda Victoria
3	Llanerch Celts (W&DL)	4–1	Mold Alexandra
4	Rhosrobin (W&DL)	2–2	Druids (W&DL)
replay	Druids (W&DL)	0–0	Rhosrobin (W&DL)
replay	Rhosrobin (W&DL)	1–4	Druids (W&DL)
5	Sandycroft	2–5	Cross Street Gwersyllt (W&DL)
6	Machynlleth (MWL)	8–0	Dolgelley
7	Llandrindod North End (MWL)	0–3	Newtown (MWL)
8	Llanidloes Town (MWL)	2–2	Aberystwyth Town (MWL)
replay	Aberystwyth Town (MWL)	2–3	Llanidloes Town (MWL)

== Third round ==
7 winners from the Second round plus Bettisfield. Llanidloes Town get a bye to the Fourth round.

Tie no	Home	Score	Away
1	Bettisfield (WLN)	2–5	Druids (W&DL)
2	Cross Street Gwersyllt (W&DL)	2–2	Llanerch Celts (W&DL)
replay	Llanerch Celts (W&DL)	4–2	Cross Street Gwersyllt (W&DL)
3	Bangor City	2–0*	Holywell Arcadians (WLN)
replay	Holywell Arcadians (WLN)	2–2	Bangor City
replay	Bangor City	0–3	Holywell Arcadians (WLN)
4	Newtown (MWL)	3–0	Machynlleth (MWL)

== Fourth round ==
Four winners from the Third round, Llanidloes Town plus 11 new clubs.

Tie no	Home	Score	Away
1	Druids (W&DL)	0–3	Colwyn Bay
2	Rhyl (WLN)	11–2	Llanerch Celts (W&DL)
3	Oswestry Town (B&DL)	5–1	Newtown (MWL)
4	Llanidloes Town (MWL)	3–2	Whitchurch (CCL)
5	Troedyrhiw (WLS D2)	2–2	Lovell's Athletic (WLS D1)
replay	Lovell's Athletic (WLS D1)	1–0	Troedyrhiw (WLS D2)
6	Ebbw Vale (WLS D1)	4–1	Barry (WLS D1 & SFL)
7	Llanelly (D1 & SFL)	5–1	Penrhiwceiber (WLS D1)
8	Merthyr Town (D1) & (SFL)	2–0	Aberaman (WLS D1)

== Fifth round ==
Eight winners from the Fourth round plus eight new teams.

Tie no	Home	Score	Away
1	Rhyl (WLN)	5–0	Llanidloes Town (MWL)
2	Shrewsbury Town (B&DL)	5–1	Colwyn Bay
3	Wrexham (FL D3N)	3–0	Holywell Arcadians (WLN)
4	Chester (FL D3N)	1–1	Oswestry Town (B&DL)
replay	Oswestry Town (B&DL)	0–4	Chester (FL D3N)
5	Merthyr Town (WLS D1) & (SFL)	2–2	Swansea Town (FL D2)
replay	Swansea Town (FL D2)	2–1	Merthyr Town (D1) & (SFL)
6	Lovell's Athletic (D1)	2–1	Ebbw Vale (D1)
7	Cardiff Corinthians (D1)	0–2	Newport County (FL D3S)
8	Cardiff City (FL D3S)	5–3	Llanelly (D1 & SFL)

== Sixth round ==
Tie no	Home	Score	Away
1	Chester (FL D3N)	2–1	Cardiff City (FL D3S)
2	Wrexham (FL D3N)	4–2	Shrewsbury Town (B&DL)
3	Lovell's Athletic (WLS D1)	2–2	Rhyl (WLN)
replay	Rhyl (WLN)	3–0	Lovell's Athletic (WLS D1)
4	Newport County (FL D3S)	0–0	Swansea Town (FL D2)
replay	Swansea Town (FL D2)	2–0	Newport County (FL D3S)

== Semifinal ==
All semifinals were held at Chester.

Tie no	Home	Score	Away
1	Wrexham (FL D3N)	3–3	Rhyl (WLN)
replay	Wrexham (FL D3N)	3–1	Rhyl (WLN)
2	Chester (FL D3N)	0–2	Swansea Town (FL D2)

== Final ==
Tie no	Home	Score	Away
1	Wrexham (FL D3N)	1–1	Swansea Town (FL D2)
replay	Swansea Town (FL D2)	2–0	Wrexham (FL D3N)
