= Guy Wharton =

English footballer

Guy Wharton (5 December 1916 – 1990) was a professional footballer who played as a wing half. He was a member of the Portsmouth team that beat Wolverhampton Wanderers 4–1 in the 1939 FA Cup Final.

Wharton began his professional career with Chester in 1934–35, after being spotted by manager Charlie Hewitt's wife playing local football. After 24 first team appearances (12 in the league), Wharton moved to First Division side Wolverhampton Wanderers in May 1936. A year later he moved to Portsmouth, where he was to enjoy his FA Cup glory against his former employers. Wharton continued playing after the Second World War, leaving Pompey for Wellington Town in 1948 before concluding his league career with 39 appearances for Darlington. After concluding his career, he was briefly a coach at Watford.

== Honours ==
=== As a player ===
Chester

- Football League Third Division North Cup: 1935–36

Portsmouth

- FA Cup: 1938–39
