= 1932–33 Welsh Cup =

Tournament details
- Country: Wales
- Teams: 65

Final positions
- Champions: (England) Chester
- Runners-up: (Wales) Wrexham

Tournament statistics
- Matches played: 76
- Goals scored: 352 (4.63 per match)

The 1932–33 FAW Welsh Cup is the 52nd season of the annual knockout tournament for competitive football teams in Wales.

== Key ==
League name pointed after clubs name.

- B&DL - Birmingham & District League
- FL D2 - Football League Second Division
- FL D3N - Football League Third Division North
- FL D3S - Football League Third Division South
- MWL - Mid-Wales Football League
- SFL - Southern Football League
- WLN - Welsh League North
- WLS D1 - Welsh League South Division One
- W&DL - Wrexham & District Amateur League

== First round ==
Tie no	Home	Score	Away
1	Llanrwst	1–5	Holywell Arcadians (WLN)
2	Rhyl Corinthians (WLN)	2–1	Caernarfon
3	Bethesda Victoria (WLN)	6–1	Holyhead Town
4	Llanfairfechan	4–0	Llandudno
5	Mancot	2–0	Sandycroft
6	Druids (W&DL)	2–2	Llanerch Celts (W&DL)
replay	Llanerch Celts (W&DL)	2–1	Druids (W&DL)
7	Buckley Town	w/o	Burntwood
8	Mold Alexandra	2–2	Flint Town
replay	Flint Town	3–1	Mold Alexandra
9	Llay Welfare (W&DL)	7–1	Bradley Victoria (W&DL)
10	Llay St Martin's (W&DL)	1–4	Gwersyllt (W&DL)
11	Welshpool (MWL)	1–1	Vron United (W&DL)
replay	Vron United (W&DL)	2–1	Welshpool (MWL)
12	Cross Street Gwersyllt (W&DL)	3–4	Northern Nomads
13	Rhayader	2–2	Builth Wells
replay	Builth Wells	6–0	Rhayader
14	Aberystwyth Town (MWL)	1–1	Aberdovey (MWL)
replay	Aberdovey (MWL)	0–5	Aberystwyth Town (MWL)
15	Newtown (MWL)	6–3	Caersws (MWL)
16	Dolgelley Albion	1–7	Tywyn (MWL)

== Second round ==
16 winners from the first round plus six new clubs.

Tie no	Home	Score	Away
1	Blaina Town	1–1	Milford Haven
replay	Milford Haven	2–1	Blaina Town
2	Llanfairfechan	2–0	Bangor University College
3	Rhyl Corinthians (WLN)	5–2	Holywell Arcadians (WLN)
4	Porthmadog	6–7	Bethesda Victoria (WLN)
5	Mancot	2–2	Llanerch Celts (W&DL)
replay	Llanerch Celts (W&DL)	6–2	Mancot
6	Flint Town	3–0	Burntwood
7	Vron United (W&DL)	0–6	Northern Nomads
8	Llay Welfare (W&DL)	0–7	Gwersyllt (W&DL)
9	Tywyn (MWL)	6–3	Aberystwyth University College (MWL)
10	Aberystwyth Town (MWL)	3–1	Newtown (MWL)
11	Builth Wells	1–6	Hereford United (B&DL)

== Third round ==
Eleven winners form the second round plus 13 new clubs.

Tie no	Home	Score	Away
1	Llanelly (WLS D1 & SFL)	w/o	Milford Haven
2	Ebbw Vale (WLS D1)	0–2	Merthyr Town (WLS D1) & (SFL)
3	Barry (WLS D1 & SFL)	2–2	Aberaman (WLS D1)
replay	Aberaman (WLS D1)	0–4	Barry (WLS D1 & SFL)
4	Cardiff Corinthians (WLS D1)	0–2	Troedyrhiw (WLS D1)
5	Flint Town	4–1	Bethesda Victoria (WLN)
6	Llanfairfechan	1–5	Bangor City (B&DL)
7	Colwyn Bay	5–1	Rhyl Corinthians (WLN)
8	Llanidloes Town (MWL)	0–3	Shrewsbury Town (B&DL)
9	Llanerch Celts (W&DL)	1–0	Northern Nomads
10	Oswestry Town (B&DL)	3–1	Gwersyllt (W&DL)
11	Tywyn (MWL)	2–3	Machynlleth (MWL)
12	Hereford United (B&DL)	1–2	Aberystwyth Town (MWL)

== Fourth round ==
12 clubs from the third round plus two new clubs.

Tie no	Home	Score	Away
1	Colwyn Bay	6–0	Flint Town
2	Bangor City (B&DL)	12–2	Llanerch Celts (W&DL)
3	Shrewsbury Town (B&DL)	3–1	Machynlleth (MWL)
4	Oswestry Town (B&DL)	5–2	Aberystwyth Town (MWL)
5	Merthyr Town (WLS D1) & (SFL)	2–2	Troedyrhiw (WLS D1)
replay	Troedyrhiw (WLS D1)	0–2	Merthyr Town (WLS D1) & (SFL)
6	Lovell's Athletic (WLS D1)	2–3	Llanelly (WLS D1 & SFL)
7	Barry (WLS D1 & SFL)	5–0	Penrhiwceiber (WLS D1)

== Fifth round ==
Six clubs from the fourth round. Merthyr Town get a bye to the Sixth round.

Tie no	Home	Score	Away
1	Barry (WLS D1 & SFL)	0–6	Llanelly (WLS D1 & SFL)
2	Oswestry Town (B&DL)	7–4	Colwyn Bay
3	Bangor City (B&DL)	3–3	Shrewsbury Town (B&DL)
replay	Shrewsbury Town (B&DL)	0–1	Bangor City (B&DL)

== Sixth round ==
Three winners from the fifth round, Merthyr Town plus 12 new teams.

Tie no	Home	Score	Away
1	Bangor City (B&DL)	2–0	New Brighton (FL D3N)
2	Rhyl (B&DL)	1–2	Southport (FL D3N)
3	Merthyr Town (WLS D1) & (SFL)	2–3	Llanelly (WLS D1 & SFL)
4	Oswestry Town (B&DL)	2–2	Wrexham (FL D3N)
replay	Wrexham (FL D3N)	4–1	Oswestry Town (B&DL)
5	Bristol Rovers (FL D3S)	0–3	Swansea Town (FL D2)
6	Crewe Alexandra (FL D3N)	3–5	Chester (FL D3N)
7	Cardiff City (FL D3S)	4–2	Tranmere Rovers (FL D3N)
8	Bristol City (FL D3S)	3–4	Newport County (FL D3S)

== Seventh round ==
Tie no	Home	Score	Away
1	Bangor City (B&DL)	1–2	Wrexham (FL D3N)
2	Llanelly (WLS D1 & SFL)	0–4	Chester (FL D3N)
3	Swansea Town (FL D2)	1–1	Cardiff City (FL D3S)
replay	Cardiff City (FL D3S)	2–1	Swansea Town (FL D2)
4	Newport County (FL D3S)	0–0	Southport (FL D3N)
replay	Southport (FL D3N)	4–0	Newport County (FL D3S)

== Semifinal ==
Replay were held at Chester.

Tie no	Home	Score	Away
1	Wrexham (FL D3N)	1–1	Southport (FL D3N)
replay	Wrexham (FL D3N)	3–1	Southport (FL D3N)
2	Chester (FL D3N)	2–1	Cardiff City (FL D3S)

== Final ==
Final were held at Chester.

Tie no	Home	Score	Away
1	Chester (FL D3N)	2–0	Wrexham (FL D3N)
