= J. M. Ranson =

England international rugby union player (1938–2026)

John Ranson
- Full name: John Matthew Ranson
- Born: 26 July 1938 Durham, England
- Died: October 2026 (aged 88)
- School: Durham School
- University: University of Birmingham
- Notable relative(s): Elizabeth Ranson (spouse), Jake Ranson (son), Jack Ranson (father)
- Occupation: Rugby union player

Rugby union career
- Position: Wing Threequarter
Youth career
- 1959-1963: Durham City
Senior career
Years	Team	Apps	(Points)
1963-1967	Rosslyn Park		
1968-1971	Headingley Rugby Union Club		
International career
Years	Team	Apps	(Points)
1963-1964	England	9	(6)
1962-1966	Barbarians	5	(12)

John Matthew Ranson (26 July 1938 – October 2026) was an England international rugby union player.

Ranson represented England as a wing threequarter eleven times between 1963 and 1964, including seven test match caps. He scored two test tries, one on his debut vs New Zealand in Auckland during the 1963 England rugby union tour of Australasia and another versus Wales. By virtue of scoring the first try in the first test, Ranson became the first Englishman to score a try against New Zealand, in New Zealand.

Atypically for the era, Ranson also represented Racing Club de France in several fixtures due to it having common committee members with Rosslyn Park RFC. Notably this included fixtures against the USA and Canadian national sides and participation in the 1966 Boston International Invitational Tournament.

He was the son of Jack Ranson, a former professional footballer. J. M. Ranson was educated at Durham School. He played club rugby for Durham City, Rosslyn Park and Headingley RFC as well as representing the Barbarian F.C.

In his post sporting life Ranson received media attention for defending his property from armed robbers using hot tea. His death at the age of 88 was announced on 27 October 2026.
