= Tom Parry (footballer) =

Welsh footballer

Personal information
- Full name: Thomas David Parry

Senior career*
Years	Team	Apps	(Gls)
- Oswestry Town

International career
1900–1902	Wales	7	(3)
- * Club domestic league appearances and goals

Thomas David Parry was a Welsh international footballer.

His brother Maurice was also a footballer, and they represented Wales together on four occasions. His nephew Frank, was also a professional footballer and made over 100 appearances in the Football League.
