= Ronnie Williams (footballer) =

Welsh footballer (1907–1987)

Personal information
- Date of birth: 23 January 1907
- Place of birth: Wales
- Date of death: 16 October 1987 (aged 80)

Senior career*
Years	Team	Apps	(Gls)
- Swansea Town
1935–36	Chester	24	(15)
- Newcastle United

International career
1934	Wales	2	(0)
- * Club domestic league appearances and goals

Ronnie Williams (23 January 1907 – 16 October 1987) was a Welsh international footballer. He was part of the Wales national football team, playing 2 matches. He played his first match on 29 September 1934 against England and his last match on 21 November 1934 against Scotland. On club level he played for Swansea Town, Chester and Newcastle United.

== See also ==
- List of Wales international footballers (alphabetical)
