= George McLaughlan =

Scottish footballer

Personal information
- Date of birth: 18 January 1904
- Place of birth: Bridgeton, Scotland
- Position: Inside forward

Senior career*
| Years | Team | Apps | (Gls) |
| 19xx–1923 | Greenhead Thistle | | |
| 1923–1924 | Celtic | 1 | (0) |
| 1923 | → Clydebank (loan) | | |
| 1924 | → Stenhousemuir (loan) | | |
| 1924 | Clydebank | | |
| 1924–1925 | Mid Rhondda | | |
| 1925–1926 | Clyde | | |
| 1926 | Darlington | 1 | (0) |
| 1926–1927 | Hull City | 8 | (2) |
| 1927–1929 | Accrington Stanley | 76 | (21) |
| 1929–1930 | Nelson | 29 | (2) |
| 1931–19xx | Morecambe | | |
- * Club domestic league appearances and goals

George McLaughlan (born 18 January 1904, date of death unknown) was a Scottish professional footballer who played as an inside forward. During his career, he had spells at clubs in Scotland, England and Wales. He joined Celtic in 1923, but only made one league appearance for the club and was loaned out to Clydebank and Stenhousemuir. After leaving Celtic, McLaughlan had short stints at Clydebank and Mid Rhondda before joining Clyde in 1925. He was a part of the Clyde team that won the Scottish Cup that year, and in 1926 he moved to England with Football League Second Division side Darlington.

McLaughlan played one League match for Darlington before transferring to Hull City in June 1926. However, he again struggled to break into the first team and made only eight appearances for the club during the 1926–27 season. In May 1927, McLaughlan signed for Third Division North side Accrington Stanley and went on to score 21 goals in 76 league games for the Lancashire outfit. During the 1929–30 season, he played 29 matches for Nelson but was one of eight players released by the club in the summer of 1930. McLaughlan subsequently moved into non-League football with Morecambe of the Lancashire Combination.
