= Jack Ranson =

English footballer (1909–1992)

Personal information
- Full name: John George Ranson
- Date of birth: 1 April 1909
- Place of birth: Norwich, England
- Date of death: 1992 (aged 82–83)
- Place of death: Selby, England
- Position: Centre forward

Senior career*
Years	Team	Apps	(Gls)
1928–1929	Norwich City	0	(0)
1930–1931	Swansea Town	24	(15)
1930–1931	Chester	8	(1)
	Colwyn Bay United	?	(?)
1932–1933	Gateshead	32	(21)
1933–1934	Millwall	34	(18)
	Burton Town	?	(?)
1934–1935	Carlisle United	15	(9)
1935–1936	Lincoln City	5	(1)
- Blyth Spartans
- Spennymoor United
- Durham City
- Horden Colliery Welfare
- Durham City
Relatives	John Ranson (son)
- * Club domestic league appearances and goals

John George Ranson (1 April 1909 – 1992) was an English footballer who played as a centre forward.

Ranson started his career with Norwich City during the 1928–1929 season, but never made an appearance. Between 1930 and 1936, Ranson played league football for Swansea Town, Chester, Gateshead, Millwall, Carlisle United and Lincoln City. During this period, Ranson also played non-league football for Colwyn Bay United and Burton Town. After leaving Lincoln City, Ranson played non-league football for Blyth Spartans, Spennymoor United, Horden Colliery Welfare and two spells at Durham City.

Ranson's only son John Ranson represented England at Rugby Union.

== Sources ==
- "allfootballers.com". Archived from the original on 22 July 2008.
