= Lindon Medley =

English footballer

Personal information
- Date of birth: 1909
- Place of birth: Bradford, England
- Position: Centre forward

Senior career*
Years	Team	Apps	(Gls)
- Yorkshire Amateur
1930–1932	Bradford City	7	(6)
1932	Southport	5	(4)
- Blackpool Electricity & Trams
- Ham's Hall
Total		12	(10)
- * Club domestic league appearances and goals

Lindon Medley (born 1909) was an English professional footballer who played as a centre forward.

== Career ==
Born in Bradford, Medley joined Bradford City from Yorkshire Amateur in August 1930. He made 7 league appearances for the club, scoring 6 goals. He left the club in 1932 to join Southport. At Southport he scored 4 goals in 5 games between October and November 1932. He later played for Blackpool Electricity & Trams and Ham's Hall.

== Sources ==
- Frost, Terry (1988). Bradford City A Complete Record 1903-1988. Breedon Books Sport. ISBN 0-907969-38-0.
