= Paul Wallbank =

Australian speaker, broadcaster and writer on business and technology

Paul Wallbank is an Australian speaker, broadcaster and writer on business and technology issues.

After some years travelling in Australia, Europe and East Asia while working in the construction industry, Paul set up a computer support company on Sydney's North Shore in January 1995. He stepped away from day-to-day operations of the business in 2007 with its interstate expansion.

In 1998 Paul was invited onto 702 ABC Sydney (2BL) to discuss the Y2K issue and answer listener's questions. The success of this segment lead to two monthly segments on ABC Local Radio programs, Nightlife with Tony Delroy and the Sydney 702 Weekend program with Simon Marnie.

In addition to this, Wallbank has a weekly column on the Australian Smart Company website discussing business and technology issues. He has also written one small business technology book and adapted five Dummies guides for the Australian market.

== Books ==
- The Australian Small Business Guide to Computers : Getting the Most Out of Your It Investment (2001). ISBN 1-875889-43-4
- PC's for Dummies 3rd Australian Edition (2004). ISBN 978-1-74031-086-4
- Laptops for Dummies Australian Edition (2005). ISBN 978-1-74031-123-6
- Internet for Dummies 3rd Australian Edition (2006) with Maryanne Phillips. ISBN 978-1-74031-160-1
- PC's for Dummies 4th Aust Edition (2008). ISBN 978-0-7314-0759-0
- Internet for Dummies 4th Aust Edition (2009). ISBN 978-0-7314-0985-3
- eBu$iness, Seven Steps to Online Success(2011). ISBN 978-0-7303-7625-5
