= Billy Coulthard =

English footballer

Personal information
- Full name: William Coulthard
- Place of birth: Darlington, England
- Height: 5 ft 8 in (1.73 m)
- Position: Full back

Senior career*
Years	Team	Apps	(Gls)
–	Southend United	0	(0)
1932–1933	Tottenham Hotspur	0	(0)
–	Spennymoor United		
1934–1937	Darlington	119	(0)
–	South Shields		
- * Club domestic league appearances and goals

William Coulthard (fl. 1932–1937) was an English footballer who made 119 appearances in the Football League playing as a full back for Darlington in the 1930s. He was on the books of Southend United and Tottenham Hotspur, but without representing either in the league, and played non-league football for Spennymoor United and South Shields.
