= 1931–32 Southern Football League =

The 1931–32 season was the 34th in the history of the Southern League. The league consisted of Eastern and Western Divisions. Dartford won the Eastern Division for the second successive season, whilst newly elected Yeovil & Petters United won the Western Division. Dartford were declared Southern League champions after winning a championship play-off 2–1.

Five clubs from the Southern League applied to join the Football League, with Aldershot Town and Newport County being successful.

== Eastern Division ==
Southern Football League Eastern Division
- Season: 1931–32
- Champions: Dartford (2nd title)
- Promoted: Aldershot Town
- Relegated: Peterborough & Fletton United (resigned); Sheppey United (resigned)
- Matches: 90
- Goals: 358 (3.98 per match)

A total of 10 teams contest the division, including 8 sides from previous season and two new teams.

Newly elected teams:

- Tunbridge Wells Rangers
- Bournemouth & Boscombe Athletic reserves

Pos	Team	Pld	W	D	L	GF	GA	GR	Pts	Qualification
1	Dartford	18	12	3	3	53	18	2.944	27	
2	Folkestone	18	12	2	4	58	27	2.148	26	
3	Guildford City	18	11	1	6	33	24	1.375	23	
4	Norwich City reserves	18	9	2	7	46	33	1.394	20	
5	Millwall reserves	18	9	2	7	41	39	1.051	20	
6	Tunbridge Wells Rangers	18	7	5	6	23	25	0.920	19	
7	Bournemouth & Boscombe Athletic reserves	18	6	4	8	43	61	0.705	16	
8	Peterborough & Fletton United	18	4	5	9	28	29	0.966	13	Left league at end of season
9	Aldershot Town	18	3	5	10	17	30	0.567	11	Elected to the Football League Third Division South
10	Sheppey United	18	2	1	15	16	72	0.222	5	Left league at end of season

Rules for classification: The system of using goal average to separate two teams tied on points was used up until the 1976–77 season. The points system: 2 points for a win, 1 point for a draw and 0 points for losing.

== Western Division ==
Southern Football League Western Division
- Season: 1931–32
- Champions: Yeovil & Petters United
- Promoted: Newport County
- Relegated: Swindon Town II (resigned); Ebbw Vale (resigned)
- Matches: 156
- Goals: 752 (4.82 per match)

A total of 13 teams contest the division, including 11 sides from previous season and two new teams.

Team relegated from 1930–31 Football League:

- Newport County

Newly elected team:

- Yeovil & Petters United

Pos	Team	Pld	W	D	L	GF	GA	GR	Pts	Qualification
1	Yeovil & Petters United	24	16	4	4	65	31	2.097	36	
2	Plymouth Argyle II	24	15	5	4	81	31	2.613	35	
3	Bath City	24	12	7	5	50	33	1.515	31	
4	Llanelly	24	12	4	8	65	46	1.413	28	
5	Taunton Town	24	13	2	9	53	58	0.914	28	
6	Newport County	24	10	6	8	70	51	1.373	26	Elected to the Football League Third Division South
7	Exeter City II	24	9	7	8	59	43	1.372	25	
8	Merthyr Town	24	9	4	11	66	73	0.904	22	
9	Bristol Rovers II	24	8	4	12	54	47	1.149	20	
10	Swindon Town II	24	8	4	12	54	95	0.568	20	Left league at end of season
11	Barry	24	7	3	14	58	76	0.763	17	
12	Torquay United II	24	5	6	13	43	66	0.652	16	
13	Ebbw Vale	24	3	2	19	34	102	0.333	8	Left league at end of season

Rules for classification: The system of using goal average to separate two teams tied on points was used up until the 1976–77 season. The points system: 2 points for a win, 1 point for a draw and 0 points for losing.

== Football League election ==
As Wigan Borough (resigned) and Thames (disbanded) had left the Football League, there were two places available, one in the Third Division North and one in the Third Division South. However, Mansfield Town were transferred from the South to the North division, meaning both vacant positions were in the South division. Five Southern League clubs applied, with Aldershot Town and Newport County (a year after being voted out) being successful in the vote.

Club	League	Votes
Gillingham	Football League	41
Newport County	Southern League	36
Aldershot Town	Southern League	35
Llanelly	Southern League	25
Guildford City	Southern League	8
Merthyr Town	Southern League	2
