= Bob Gartside =

English footballer

Personal information
- Full name: Robert Gartside
- Date of birth: 21 January 1906
- Place of birth: Nelson, England
- Date of death: 26 August 1970 (aged 64)
- Place of death: Nelson, England
- Position: Centre forward

Senior career*
Years	Team	Apps	(Gls)
1924–1928	Barnoldswick Town	53	(45)
1928–1929	Trawden	38	(21)
1929	Nelson	1	(0)
1929–1930	Clitheroe	?	(?)
1930–1931	Bacup Borough	8	(4)
1931–1932	Clitheroe	?	(?)
1932–1933	Nelson	?	(?)
Total		100	(70)
- * Club domestic league appearances and goals

Robert Gartside (21 January 1906 – 26 August 1970) was an English professional footballer who played as a centre forward. He made one appearance in the Football League for Nelson, but played the majority of his career in Non-League football He has also played over 50 times for Barnoldswick and more than 30 times for Trawden as well as starting 100 games for his clubs.

== Barnoldswick Town ==
Gartside was born in Nelson but played for rivals Barnoldswick Town. He made his debut and scored four in a 12-1 thumping of Halifax Town, which is only their second most heaviest defeat. They then faced Nelson and Gartside scored 5 in a 7-0 trashing. Barnoldswick went on to be promoted to the West Lancashire League. Gartside finished top scorer in the league, scoring 19 in the 24/25 season. Barnoldswick were promoted to the National League North and stayed there. Gartside once again got top scorer with 15 goals. However, in 1927, he broke his leg and fractured his kneecap. This ruled him out for 6 months but he made his return against Northampton in a 3–1 win. He made a 50th start against Plymouth Argyle where they won 5–3 with Gartside netting another hattrick, his 10th. He made three more appearances and finished the season with 11 goals.

== Trawden and Nelson loan ==
Gartside chose to give himself a challenge and signed up for non-league football side Trawden. He made his debut against Colne, scoring 5 in a 7–3 win. From there on his season thrived, with Gartside grabbing three hattricks in three consecutive matches. He finished the season with 21 goals. Despite his brilliant form, Trawden decided they weren't "worthy enough for him" and loaned him to Nelson. However, he was outnumbered by better strikers and only made one start in the Football League. After the unsuccessful loan spell, Trawden sold him to Clitheroe.

== Later life and death ==
Between 1929 and 1933 we don't know much about Gartside. He played for Clitheroe for one season, before he was loaned out to Bacup Borough, where he made another 8 appearances for the club, totalling 100 apps for all the clubs he played for. He scored a hattrick on his second game with the club when they won against Trafford 6-2 and a goal against Charnock Richard as the team won 5–1, reaching the 70 goal mark. He came back to Clitheroe for another season, but he was outruled by younger players. He went to Nelson and soon after a season there, he retired at 27. Gartside bought a home in Nelson and lived there for the rest of his life. He died on 26 August 1970, aged 64.
