= Gerry Kelly (footballer) =

English footballer

Personal information
- Full name: Gerard Michael Kelly
- Date of birth: 18 September 1908
- Place of birth: South Hylton, Sunderland, England
- Date of death: January qtr. 1983 (aged 74)
- Place of death: Luton, England
- Height: 5 ft 7 in (1.70 m)
- Position: Winger

Youth career
- Castletown
- Hylton Colliery Welfare

Senior career*
Years	Team	Apps	(Gls)
1927–1928	Sunderland	0	(0)
1928–1929	Nelson	47	(15)
1929–1931	Huddersfield Town	37	(15)
1931–1932	Charlton Athletic	20	(6)
1932–1936	Chester	73	(27)
1936–1937	Port Vale	20	(2)
1937–1939	Southampton	19	(2)
Total		216	(67)
- * Club domestic league appearances and goals

Gerard Michael Kelly (18 September 1908 – January qtr. 1983) was an English footballer who scored 67 goals in 216 league appearances in a 12-year career in the Football League from 1927 to 1939. He played for Sunderland, Nelson, Huddersfield Town, Charlton Athletic, Chester, Port Vale, and Southampton.

== Career ==
Kelly left Hylton Colliery at 19 to sign for Sunderland in 1927. He never made the first team at Roker Park and the following year joined Nelson. He scored 11 goals in 38 appearances in the 1928–29 season, bagging his first goal in the Football League in a 5–1 win over Southport at Haig Avenue on 8 September. He scored four goals in nine Third Division North games in the 1929–30 campaign before departing Seedhill.

He signed with Huddersfield Town, and scored seven goals in 14 First Division games in the 1929–30 season. He scored eight goals in 20 appearances for the "Terriers" in the 1930–31 campaign, including a hat-trick against Manchester United at Old Trafford on 10 September. However, he played just four games at Leeds Road at the start of the 1931–32 season before signing with Charlton Athletic, and seeing out the 1931–32 season with six goals in 20 Second Division games for the "Addicks".

He then left The Valley and joined Chester. The "Seals" finished fourth in the Third Division North in 1932–33, before posting tenth and third-place finishes in 1933–34 and 1934–35 He scored 27 goals in 73 league appearances in his time at Sealand Road. He joined Third Division North side Port Vale for a "substantial fee" in June 1936. Starting firmly in the first XI, his place slipped away over the 1936–37 season and he went on to score twice in 21 league and cup games. He also played for the reserve team in the Cheshire County League and represented the league against a Southern Football League XI at Portman Road on 27 February 1937. In August 1937 he was given a free transfer from the Old Recreation Ground to Second Division club Southampton.

A very quick right-winger who could also play as a centre-forward, he arrived at The Dell to add depth to the Southampton forward line. Although he brought a wealth of experience with him, he spent most of his time in the reserves, and in his two years on the south coast, he made only 19 first-team appearances, scoring twice. Following the outbreak of the Second World War his professional career ended and he retired from the game.

== Career statistics ==
Appearances and goals by club, season and competition
Club	Season	League			FA Cup		Other		Total	
Club	Season	Division	Apps	Goals	Apps	Goals	Apps	Goals	Apps	Goals
Sunderland	1927–28	First Division	0	0	0	0	0	0	0	0
Nelson	1928–29	Third Division North	38	11	0	0	0	0	38	11
Nelson	1929–30	Third Division North	9	4	0	0	0	0	9	4
Nelson	Total		47	15	0	0	0	0	47	15
Huddersfield Town	1929–30	First Division	14	7	0	0	0	0	14	7
Huddersfield Town	1930–31	First Division	19	8	1	0	0	0	20	8
Huddersfield Town	1931–32	First Division	4	0	0	0	0	0	4	0
Huddersfield Town	Total		37	15	1	0	0	0	38	15
Charlton Athletic	1931–32	Second Division	12	5	0	0	0	0	12	5
Charlton Athletic	1932–33	Second Division	8	1	0	0	0	0	8	1
Charlton Athletic	Total		20	6	0	0	0	0	20	6
Chester	1932–33	Third Division North	15	5	1	0	0	0	16	5
Chester	1933–34	Third Division North	19	7	0	0	3	0	22	7
Chester	1934–35	Third Division North	25	8	2	2	1	1	28	11
Chester	1935–36	Third Division North	14	7	0	0	0	0	14	7
Chester	Total		73	27	3	2	4	1	80	30
Port Vale	1936–37	Third Division North	20	2	1	0	0	0	21	2
Southampton	1937–38	Second Division	14	2	0	0	0	0	14	2
Southampton	1938–39	Second Division	5	0	0	0	0	0	5	0
Southampton	1939–40		0	0	0	0	1	0	1	0
Southampton	Total		19	2	0	0	1	0	20	2
Career total			216	67	5	2	5	1	226	70
