= Herbert Butler (footballer) =

English footballer (1906–??)

Hubert Butler
Personal information
- Date of birth: 11 July 1906
- Place of birth: Atherton, Lancashire, England
- Position: Forward

Youth career
- ?–1928: Chorley

Senior career*
| Years | Team | Apps | (Gls) |
| 1928–1932 | Crystal Palace | 108 | (31) |
| 1928–? | Chester City | | |
- * Club domestic league appearances and goals

Hubert Butler (11 July 1906 – unknown) was an English professional footballer who played as a forward.

== Playing career ==
Butler was born in Atherton, Lancashire. He began his career in non-league football at Chorley F.C. and in June 1928 signed for Crystal Palace, then playing in the Football League Third Division South. He made his debut in an away defeat to Northampton Town in October and then became a regular in the side which finished second in the table in 1928–9 making 26 League appearances and scoring 10 times. Over the following three seasons, Butler made 22 appearances (four goals), 39 appearances (14 goals) and 21 appearances (3 goals) respectively. In June 1932, Butler moved on to Chester City. He had made 124 appearances in all competitions for Palace, scoring 39 times.
