= George Dickie (footballer) =

Scottish footballer

Personal information
- Full name: George James Dickie
- Date of birth: 22 September 1903
- Place of birth: Montrose, Scotland
- Date of death: 1960 (aged 56–57)
- Position: Outside left

Senior career*
Years	Team	Apps	(Gls)
- Buckie Thistle
1923	Preston North End	0	(0)
–	Buckie Thistle		
1925	Stoke City	1	(0)
1925	Preston North End	3	(1)
- Forres Mechanics
1926–1927	St Johnstone	5	(0)
1927–1928	New Brighton	56	(15)
1928–1929	Bristol City	48	(4)
- Chester
1931–1932	Macclesfield	36	(9)
1932	Chester	1	(0)
1932	New Brighton	27	(4)
Total		177	(33)
- * Club domestic league appearances and goals

George James Dickie (22 September 1903 – 1960) was a Scottish footballer who played in the English Football League for Bristol City, Chester, New Brighton, Preston North End and Stoke City.

== Career ==
Dickie was born in Montrose and played for Buckie Thistle where he had an unsuccessful trial at Preston North End in 1923 before joining Stoke City in 1925. He played once for Stoke before signing for Preston and then returned to Scotland with Forres Mechanics and then St Johnstone. He them made a more successful spell in English football playing two seasons for New Brighton and Bristol City. Dickie then went on to play for Chester, Macclesfield and made a return to New Brighton.

== Career statistics ==
Club	Season	League			FA Cup		Total	
Club	Season	Division	Apps	Goals	Apps	Goals	Apps	Goals
Stoke City	1925–26	Second Division	1	0	0	0	1	0
Preston North End	1925–26	Second Division	3	1	0	0	3	1
New Brighton	1927–28	Third Division North	42	11	4	0	46	11
New Brighton	1928–29	Third Division North	14	4	1	0	15	4
Bristol City	1928–29	Second Division	25	3	0	0	25	3
Bristol City	1929–30	Second Division	23	1	0	0	23	1
Macclesfield	1931–32	Cheshire League	36	9	5	3	41	12
Chester	1932–33	Third Division North	1	0	0	0	1	0
New Brighton	1932–33	Third Division North	27	4	0	0	27	4
Career Total			172	33	10	3	182	36
