= Harry Skitt =

English footballer (1901–1976)

Personal information
- Date of birth: 26 June 1901
- Place of birth: Portobello, West Midlands, England
- Date of death: 28 January 1976 (aged 74)
- Position: Centre half

Senior career*
Years	Team	Apps	(Gls)
- Darlaston
- Northfleet United
1924–1931	Tottenham Hotspur	212	(0)
1931–1935	Chester	101	(0)
- * Club domestic league appearances and goals

Harry Skitt (26 June 1901 - 28 January 1976) was a professional footballer who played for Darlaston, Northfleet United, Tottenham Hotspur, and Chester.

== Football career ==
Skitt began his career at Darlaston before joining Spurs nursery club Northfleet United. The defender joined Tottenham in 1924 and played a total of 229 matches in all competitions for the White Hart Lane club. In 1931 Skitt moved to Chester ahead of their debut season in The Football League along with fellow Spurs players Baden Herod and Andy Thompson. He went on to make a further 101 appearances before ending his career at Congleton.
