= Sammy Armes =

English footballer (1908–1958)

Samuel Armes
Personal information
- Full name: Samuel Armes
- Date of birth: 30 March 1908
- Place of birth: New Seaham, England
- Date of death: 27 August 1958 (aged 50)
- Place of death: Sunderland, England
- Position: Outside right

Senior career*
Years	Team	Apps	(Gls)
- Howden
- Dawdon Colliery
1929–1931	Carlisle United	76	(19)
1932–1933	Chester	31	(13)
1933	Blackpool	4	(0)
1934–1935	Wigan Athletic	47	(20)
1935–1938	Leeds United	79	(8)
1938	Middlesbrough	3	(0)
- * Club domestic league appearances and goals

Samuel Armes (30 March 1908 – 27 August 1958) was an English footballer who played at outside right.

He started his Football League career with Carlisle United before joining Chester and Blackpool.

Armes joined Wigan Athletic in 1934, and scored twice in the club's 6–1 win against his former club Carlisle United in the first round of the 1934–35 FA Cup, a record margin of victory for a non-league side over a Football League team in the competition. He went on to score 20 goals in 47 Cheshire League games before being signed by Leeds United during the 1935–36 season.

He died in Sunderland on 27 August 1958, and his funeral took place at Dawdon Parish Church.
