= Fred Ferrari =

English footballer

Personal information
- Full name: Frederick Joseph Ferrari
- Date of birth: 22 May 1901
- Place of birth: Stratford, England
- Date of death: 6 August 1970 (aged 69)
- Place of death: Sheffield, England
- Position: Centre forward

Senior career*
Years	Team	Apps	(Gls)
- Barking Town
- Leyton
1925–1926	Northampton Town	18	(0)
1926–1927	Sheffield Wednesday	0	(0)
1927–1928	Norwich City	4	(0)
1928–1929	Barrow	26	(14)
1929–1930	Nelson	7	(3)
1930	Burton Town		
1930–1931	Bedouins	2	(0)
1931–1933	Queens Park Rangers	0	(0)
1933–1936	Hillsborough Old Boys		
- * Club domestic league appearances and goals

Frederick Joseph Ferrari (22 May 1901 – 6 August 1970) was an English professional footballer who played as a centre forward.

== Biography ==
Fred Ferrari was born in Stratford, London on 22 May 1901 to an Italian father and an English mother. He spent the majority of his football career in the North of England and in later life he settled in Sheffield, South Yorkshire, where he worked in the steel industry following his retirement from football. He died in Sheffield on 6 August 1970 at the age of 69.

== Career ==
Ferrari started his career in non-league football with Barking Town and then Leyton, before joining Football League Third Division South club Northampton Town on a free transfer in October 1925. He played 18 league games for the side, but did not score any goals. In June 1926, he was signed by Football League First Division outfit Sheffield Wednesday for a transfer fee of £800. He spent his entire spell at Hillsborough in the reserves, failing to make a single first-team appearance for the club. After a trial period with Flint Town United, Ferrari joined Third Division South side Norwich City for a £150 fee in December 1927. He played four league matches for the Canaries before moving to Barrow on a free transfer at the start of the 1928–29 season.

At Barrow, Ferrari had the most prolific season of his career with a total of 14 goals in 26 league appearances. On 23 February 1929, he scored a hat-trick in a league match against Nelson and the Nelson directors soon pursued him. In June that year, Ferrari signed for Nelson for a fee of £85 and went straight into the first-team, making his debut on 31 August 1929 in the 2–2 draw with Southport. He scored his first goal for the club in the following game, a 1–6 defeat away at Darlington. He scored a total of three goals in the first seven matches of the season, but was then dropped from the team following the 0–3 loss to Accrington Stanley on 24 September.

In February 1930, Ferrari had a trial with Chesterfield but no permanent deal materialised and he joined non-league club Burton Town the following month. After three months he joined Bedouins, and later had a trial at Mansfield Town before returning to the Third Division South with Queens Park Rangers in January 1931. Despite staying at Loftus Road for over two years, he played no matches for the club. Ferrari left to join amateur Sheffield outfit Hillsborough Old Boys in September 1933. He stayed with the side for three seasons before having a short spell with Darwin's Sports in October 1936, after which he retired from football.
