= Edward Manock =

English footballer

Personal information
- Date of birth: 30 June 1904
- Place of birth: Salford, England
- Date of death: 12 April 1983 (aged 78)
- Place of death: Blyth, Nottinghamshire, England
- Height: 5 ft 9 in (1.75 m)
- Position: Inside forward

Senior career*
| Years | Team | Apps | (Gls) |
| 19xx–1929 | Chester | ? | (?) |
| 1929–1931 | Nelson | 18 | (2) |
| 1931–1934 | Sandbach Ramblers | ? | (?) |
- * Club domestic league appearances and goals

Edward Manock (30 June 1904 – 12 April 1983) was an English professional footballer who played as an inside forward. Born in Salford, he started his career as an amateur player in the Cheshire County League with Chester. He was signed by Football League Third Division North side Nelson on amateur terms in November 1929. Manock made his Nelson debut on 28 December 1929 in the 0–0 draw away at Southport, and the following month he was awarded a professional contract. He scored his first League goal in the 1–2 defeat against Stockport County at Seedhill. In total, he made 13 first-team appearances during his first season in Lancashire.

Manock was retained by Nelson for the 1930–31 season, but he played only one league match in the first eight months of the campaign. However, he was selected for the final four matches of the season, and scored his second goal for the club in the 1–4 loss to Southport on 18 April 1931. Manock was in the starting line-up for Nelson's last ever match in the Football League, a 0–4 defeat away at Hull City on 2 May 1931. Along with the majority of the playing squad, he left Nelson after they failed re-election to the League and were replaced by his former club, Chester.

Upon his release from Nelson, Manock returned to the Cheshire County League with Sandbach Ramblers. In October 1934 he joined the Pendleton Glass Works company team as an amateur. He moved to CWS Glass Works in Worksop, his final team, in September 1936. Manock died in Blyth, Nottinghamshire, on 12 April 1983 at the age of 78.
