= Andy Thompson (footballer, born 1899) =

English footballer

Personal information
- Full name: Andrew Thompson
- Date of birth: 21 January 1899
- Place of birth: Newcastle upon Tyne, England
- Date of death: 1 January 1970 (aged 70)
- Place of death: Leyton, England
- Height: 5 ft 9 in (1.75 m)
- Position: Outside right

Senior career*
Years	Team	Apps	(Gls)
1920–1930	Tottenham Hotspur	153	(20)
1931–1931	Chester	7	(2)
1931–1932	Norwich City	12	(2)
1932–?	Clapton Orient	18	(5)
	Ashford Town (Kent)	?	(?)
	Northfleet United	?	(?)
- * Club domestic league appearances and goals

Andrew Thompson (21 January 1899 – 1 January 1970) was a professional footballer who played for Tottenham Hotspur, Chester, Norwich City, Clapton Orient, Ashford Town (Kent) and Northfleet.

== Football career ==
Thompson began his playing career in the North East with non–league Whickham Park Villa and later Newburn before joining Tottenham. He made his debut for the Lilywhites versus Sunderland on 26 March 1921 in the position of centre half. Thompson converted to the forward line where he scored 22 goals in 166 appearances in all competitions. He joined Chester in July, 1931 where he played a further seven games and finding the net twice before moving to Norwich City. He featured in a further 12 matches and scored on two occasions for the East Anglian club. In 1932 he joined Clapton Orient where he went on to make a further 18 appearances and netting five times. Ashford Town was his next club before becoming player coach at Northfleet. He returned to the Spurs in 1938 where he held the position of assistant coach. On leaving the White Hart Lane club he became a member of the Chelsea training staff. He once again returned to the Spurs in the 1950s to be in charge of the youth team until 1960 and held a number of backroom roles till his retirement in August, 1969.

Thompson died at home on 1 January 1970 in Leyton.
