= Danny Ferguson =

Welsh footballer

Personal information
- Full name: Archibald Daniel Ferguson
- Date of birth: 25 January 1903
- Place of birth: Flint, Wales
- Date of death: October 1971 (aged 68)
- Position: Forward

Senior career*
Years	Team	Apps	(Gls)
????–1927	Rhyl Athletic		
1927–1928	Manchester United	4	(0)
1928–?	Reading		
- Accrington Stanley
- Chester
- Halifax Town
- Stockport County
- Macclesfield Town
- * Club domestic league appearances and goals

Archibald Daniel Ferguson (25 January 1903 – October 1971) was a Welsh footballer who played as a forward. Born in Flint, he played for Rhyl Athletic, Manchester United, Reading, Accrington Stanley, Chester, Halifax Town, Stockport County and Macclesfield Town in the 1920s and 1930s.
