= Ernie Dixon =

English footballer

Personal information
- Full name: Ernest Dixon
- Date of birth: 10 July 1901
- Place of birth: Pudsey, England
- Date of death: 27 April 1941 (aged 39)
- Place of death: Bradford, England
- Height: 5 ft 9 1/2 in (1.77 m)
- Position: Forward

Senior career*
Years	Team	Apps	(Gls)
1921–1922	Bradford City	1	(0)
1922–1924	Halifax Town	58	(33)
1924	Burnley	3	(0)
1924–1929	Halifax Town	176	(95)
1929	Huddersfield Town	5	(1)
1929–1930	Nelson	28	(10)
1930–1933	Tranmere Rovers	83	(53)
Total		354	(192)
- * Club domestic league appearances and goals

Ernest Dixon (10 July 1901 – 27 April 1941) was a footballer born in Pudsey, England who played as a forward in The Football League in the 1920s and 1930s.

He played for Bradford City, Halifax Town, Burnley, Huddersfield Town, Nelson and Tranmere Rovers.

He is Halifax's all-time record goalscorer with 132 goals in all competitions.

At the end of his career, he also had spells in non-league football with Gresley Rovers .
