= Tom Jennings (footballer) =

Scottish footballer and manager (1902–1973)

Personal information
- Full name: Thomas Hamilton Oliver Jennings
- Date of birth: 8 March 1902
- Place of birth: Strathaven, Scotland
- Date of death: 2 July 1973 (aged 71)
- Place of death: Johnstone, Scotland
- Position: Striker

Senior career*
| Years | Team | Apps | (Gls) |
- Cadzow St Anne's
| 1919 | Tottenham Hotspur (trial) | 0 | (0) |
| 1921–1925 | Raith Rovers | | |
| 1925–1931 | Leeds United | 167 | (112) |
| 1931–1933 | Chester | 48 | (33) |
- Bangor City

Managerial career
- Bangor City
- 1934–1939: Third Lanark
- * Club domestic league appearances and goals

Thomas Hamilton Oliver Jennings (8 March 1902 – 2 July 1973) was a Scottish footballer. He was a prolific goalscorer for Leeds United and Chester City, averaging well over a goal every other game.

== Career ==
Jennings started his career with Cadzow St Anne's and had a trial with Tottenham Hotspur in 1919, playing no games for the club. He then moved on to Raith Rovers, before joining Leeds United in March 1925. He made 167 league appearances for the club, in which he scored no fewer than 112 goals, including 20-goal seasons in 1925–26 and 1927–28 and a remarkable 37 in between (with three consecutive hat-tricks), before he joined Chester in June 1931. He made 48 league appearances and scored 33 goals and in 1933 joined Bangor City.

Jennings officially scored Chester's first-ever Football League goal in a 1–1 draw with Wrexham on 2 September 1931. Although Chester had beaten Wigan Borough 4-0 four days earlier (with Jennings scoring the third goal), the result was deleted after Wigan resigned from the Football League in October 1931.

Later in the season he scored Chester's first Football League hat-trick, when he scored all the club's goals in a 5–1 win over Walsall in January 1932. His tally of five goals in one game has only been matched once (by Barry Jepson in 1958) and never bettered by a Chester player in a Football League fixture. Jennings also scored four times in a 7–2 win over Rochdale in April 1932 and comfortably ended the season as Chester's top scorer, with 30 league goals to his name. But he only played nine more league games for the club after this and moved on.

Jennings later managed Bangor City and Third Lanark.
