= Josh Atkinson =

English footballer (1902–1983)

Personal information
- Full name: Joshua Whitehead Atkinson
- Date of birth: 28 March 1902
- Place of birth: Blackpool, England
- Date of death: 1983 (aged 80–81)
- Height: 5 ft 9 1/2 in (1.77 m)
- Positions: Left half; right half

Senior career*
| Years | Team | Apps | (Gls) |
| 1923 | Blackpool | 0 | (0) |
| 1924–1927 | Leeds United | 52 | (0) |
| 1928–1929 | Barnsley | 61 | (2) |
| 1931 | Chester | 7 | (0) |
- Fleetwood Town
- * Club domestic league appearances and goals

Joshua Whitehead Atkinson (28 March 1902 – 1983) was an English footballer. He began his career with his hometown club Blackpool in 1923, but did not make any League appearances for the Seasiders. He joined Leeds United in 1924, and went on to make 52 League appearances for the club. Four years later, he joined Barnsley, for whom he scored his first League goals: two in 61 appearances. He joined Chester in 1931, making seven League appearances, before finishing his career back on the Fylde coast with Fleetwood Town.

== Sources ==
- Joyce, Michael (2004). Football League Players' Records 1888-1939. ISBN 1-899468-67-6.
