= Ralph Chapman (footballer) =

English footballer

Personal information
- Date of birth: 26 January 1906
- Place of birth: Salford, England
- Date of death: March 1999 (aged 93)
- Place of death: Peterborough, England
- Height: 5 ft 7 in (1.70 m)
- Position: Outside forward

Senior career*
Years	Team	Apps	(Gls)
1929–1931	Nelson	10	(0)
- * Club domestic league appearances and goals

Ralph Chapman (26 January 1906 – March 1999) was an English professional footballer who played as an outside forward. He played ten matches in the Football League for Nelson.
