= Robert Middleton (footballer) =

Scottish footballer

Personal information
- Date of birth: 15 January 1903
- Place of birth: Brechin, Scotland
- Height: 5 ft 10 in (1.78 m)
- Position: Goalkeeper

Senior career*
| Years | Team | Apps | (Gls) |
- Brechin City
- Cowdenbeath
| 1930–1933 | Sunderland | 59 | (0) |
- Burton Town
| 1933–1938 | Chester | 56 | (0) |

International career
| 1930 | Scotland | 1 | (0) |
- * Club domestic league appearances and goals

Robert Middleton (born 15 January 1903) was a Scottish footballer who played as a goalkeeper.

== Career ==
Born in Brechin, Middleton played club football for Brechin City, Cowdenbeath, Sunderland, Burton Town and Chester, and made one appearance for Scotland in 1930. For Sunderland he made 66 appearances in all competitions.
