= Baden Herod =

English footballer

Personal information
- Full name: Edwin Redvers Baden Herod
- Date of birth: 16 May 1900
- Place of birth: Ilford, England
- Date of death: 9 May 1973 (aged 72)
- Place of death: Dagenham, England
- Height: 5 ft 11 in (1.80 m)
- Position: Full back

Senior career*
Years	Team	Apps	(Gls)
- Barking Town
- Ilford
–1921	Great Eastern Railway Works		
1921–1927	Charlton Athletic	213	(2)
1928–1929	Brentford	28	(0)
1929–1930	Tottenham Hotspur	57	(0)
1931–1933	Chester	79	(1)
1933–1935	Swindon Town	81	(0)
1935–1936	Clapton Orient	53	(0)
- * Club domestic league appearances and goals

Edwin Redvers Baden Herod (16 May 1900 – 9 May 1973) was an English professional footballer who played for Barking Town, Ilford, Great Eastern Railway Works F.C., Charlton Athletic, Brentford, Tottenham Hotspur, Chester, Swindon Town and Clapton Orient. He made over 500 appearances in the Football League.

== Football career ==
Herod played for non League clubs Barking Town, Ilford and Great Eastern Railway Works before joining Charlton Athletic in 1921, the full back played 236 matches and scored twice in all competitions between 1921 and 1927 at the Valley. He joined Brentford in 1928, his £1500 fee breaking the club's incoming record. Herod played a further 28 games before joining Tottenham Hotspur in February 1929 for a then club record fee of £4,000. Herod featured in a total of 58 matches in all competitions for the Lilywhites. After leaving White Hart Lane, Herod had spells at Chester, Swindon Town, before signing for Clapton Orient, where he ended his playing career.
