= 1932–33 Southern Football League =

The 1932–33 season was the 35th in the history of the Southern League. The league consisted of Eastern and Western Divisions. Norwich City reserves won the Eastern Division, whilst Bath City won the Western Division. Norwich reserves were declared Southern League champions after winning a championship play-off 2–1.

Three clubs from the Southern League applied to join the Football League, but none were successful.

== Eastern Division ==
Southern Football League Eastern Division
- Season: 1932–33
- Champions: Norwich City II (1st title)
- Promoted: none
- Relegated: Aldershot II (resigned)
- Matches: 56
- Goals: 227 (4.05 per match)

A total of 8 teams contest the division, including 7 sides from previous season and one new team.

Newly elected team:

- Aldershot II

Pos	Team	Pld	W	D	L	GF	GA	GR	Pts	Result
1	Norwich City II	14	9	2	3	34	22	1.545	20	
2	Dartford	14	8	2	4	26	23	1.130	18	
3	Folkestone	14	7	1	6	35	32	1.094	15	
4	Bournemouth & Boscombe Athletic II	14	5	4	5	36	33	1.091	14	
5	Tunbridge Wells Rangers	14	5	2	7	23	24	0.958	12	
6	Guildford City	14	5	2	7	22	28	0.786	12	
7	Millwall II	14	5	1	8	27	31	0.871	11	
8	Aldershot II	14	3	4	7	24	34	0.706	10	Left league at end of season

Rules for classification: The system of using goal average to separate two teams tied on points was used until the 1976-77 season. The points system: 2 points for a win, 1 point for a draw and 0 points for losing.

== Western Division ==
Southern Football League Western Division
- Season: 1932–33
- Champions: Bath City
- Promoted: none
- Relegated: none
- Matches: 110
- Goals: 545 (4.95 per match)

A total of 11 teams contest the division, including 10 sides from previous season and one new team.

Newly elected teams:

- Newport County II

Pos	Team	Pld	W	D	L	GF	GA	GR	Pts
1	Bath City	20	13	4	3	62	34	1.824	30
2	Exeter City II	20	12	3	5	62	46	1.348	27
3	Torquay United II	20	12	1	7	56	37	1.514	25
4	Plymouth Argyle II	20	11	2	7	68	38	1.789	24
5	Yeovil & Petters United	20	11	2	7	59	44	1.341	24
6	Llanelly	20	10	2	8	53	33	1.606	22
7	Bristol Rovers II	20	7	3	10	53	65	0.815	17
8	Newport County II	20	6	4	10	42	55	0.764	16
9	Merthyr Town	20	7	1	12	39	58	0.672	15
10	Barry	20	3	4	13	30	72	0.417	10
11	Taunton Town	20	4	2	14	21	63	0.333	10

Rules for classification: The system of using goal average to separate two teams tied on points was used until the 1976-77 season. The points system: 2 points for a win, 1 point for a draw and 0 points for losing.

== Football League election ==
Three Southern League clubs applied for the two election places in the Third Division South of the Football League. However, none were successful as the two League clubs were re-elected.

Club	League	Votes
Swindon Town	Football League	45
Newport County	Football League	26
Llanelly	Southern League	20
Folkestone	Southern League	5
Merthyr Town	Southern League	1
Nuneaton Town	Birmingham & District League	1
