= Joe Mantle =

English footballer

Personal information
- Full name: Joseph Mantle
- Date of birth: 9 May 1908
- Place of birth: Hetton-le-Hole, England
- Date of death: 1977 (aged 68–69)
- Height: 5 ft 10 in (1.78 m)
- Position: Centre forward

Senior career*
Years	Team	Apps	(Gls)
1927–1931	Burnley	50	(22)
1931–1932	Plymouth Argyle	15	(7)
1932–1935	Chester	74	(63)
1935–1937	Carlisle United	55	(38)
1937–1938	Stockport County	22	(12)
1938–1939	Heart of Midlothian	?	(?)
1939	Hartlepools United	0	(0)
- * Club domestic league appearances and goals

Joseph Mantle (9 May 1908 – 1977) He was an English professional footballer who played as a forward. Mantle is best known for his time at clubs like Aston Villa and Notts County during the late 19th and early 20th centuries. He had a successful career and was well-regarded for his skills on the field.
