= Horace Wallbanks =

English footballer

Personal information
- Full name: William Horace Wallbanks
- Date of birth: 9 April 1918
- Place of birth: Chopwell, England
- Date of death: 2004 (aged 85–86)
- Position: Winger

Senior career*
Years	Team	Apps	(Gls)
1937–1938	Chopwell		
1938–1943	Ashington		
1943–1946	Aberdeen		
1946–1947	Grimsby Town	9	(1)
1947–1948	Luton Town	4	(1)
1948–19??	Weymouth		
- * Club domestic league appearances and goals

William Horace Wallbanks (9 April 1918 – 2004) was an English professional footballer who played as a winger.
