= Chopwell =

Village in Tyne and Wear, England

Coordinates: 54.919°N 1.815°W

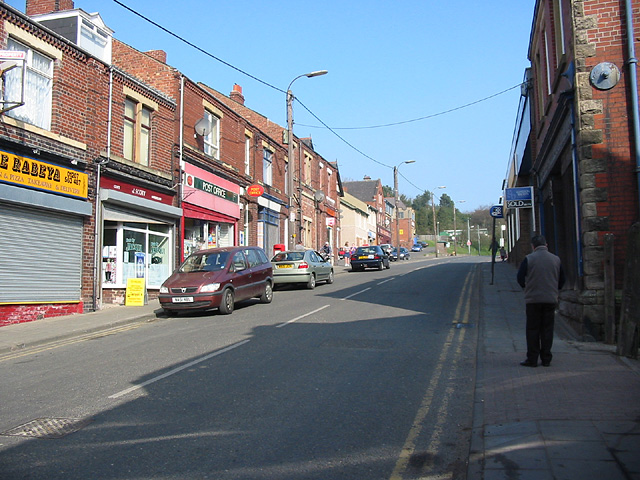
- Derwent Street, Chopwell

- Location within Tyne and Wear
- Population: 3,096 (2011)
- OS grid reference: NZ119582
- Metropolitan borough: Gateshead
- Metropolitan county: Tyne and Wear
- Region: North East
- Country: England
- Sovereign state: United Kingdom
- Post town: NEWCASTLE UPON TYNE
- Postcode district: NE17
- Dialling code: 01207
- Police: Northumbria
- Fire: Tyne and Wear
- Ambulance: North East
- UK Parliament: Blaydon and Consett

Chopwell is a village in the Gateshead district, in the county of Tyne and Wear, England, 3 miles (4.8 km) west of Rowlands Gill and 1 mile (1.6 km) north of Hamsterley. At the 2011 Census, it had a population of 9,395.

In 1150, Bishop Pudsey granted the Manor of Chopwell to the first Abbot of Newminster. Newminster Abbey retained possession of the manor until the dissolution of the Monasteries in 1536.

Traditionally an area of coal mining, Chopwell was nicknamed "Little Moscow" because of the strong support for the Communist Party. Chopwell counts "Marx Terrace" (after Karl Marx) and "Lenin Terrace" (after Vladimir Lenin) among its street names, and during the 1926 General Strike the Union Flag at the council offices was taken down and replaced with the Soviet flag. Another notable street, site of the former Chopwell Junior School, "Fannybush Road", was renamed "Whittonstall Road" by the local authority in the 1990s after its street sign was repeatedly stolen.

In 1974, Chopwell became part of the metropolitan county of Tyne and Wear and the metropolitan borough of Gateshead, after previously being part of the administrative county of Durham.

== Civil parish ==
Chopwell was formerly a township in the parish of Winlaton. From 1866, Chopwell was a civil parish in its own right, until on 1 April 1937 the parish was abolished to form Blaydon parish; in 1931 the population of the parish had been of 9,784.

== See also ==
- Chopwell Colliery
