= Frank Cresswell =

English footballer

Personal information
- Date of birth: 5 September 1908
- Place of birth: South Shields, England
- Date of death: 1979 (aged 70–71)
- Position: Forward

Youth career
- Tyne Dock

Senior career*
Years	Team	Apps	(Gls)
1925–1926	South Shields		
1926–1929	Sunderland	13	(1)
1929–1931	West Bromwich Albion	30	(6)
1930	→Connah's Quay Nomads		
1930–1931	→ Chester	40	(27)
1931–1934	Chester	97	(26)
1934	Notts County	16	(4)
1934–1938	Chester	76	(31)

International career
- England Schoolboys
- * Club domestic league appearances and goals

Frank Cresswell (born 5 September 1908 – 2 December 1979) was an English professional footballer who played as a forward. He made appearances in The Football League for four clubs between 1926 and 1938.

== Playing career ==
Frank, the brother of England international Warney Cresswell, was with local non–league side Tyne Dock and then at Football League side South Shields before moving to First Division side Sunderland in time for the 1926–27 season. He made 13 appearances for the Black Cats over the next three years and then spent a season playing for Second Division side West Bromwich Albion.

In 1930, Cresswell joined Cheshire County League side Chester after a spell with Connah's Quay Nomads, one of several signings ahead of the 1930–31 season made by new manager Charlie Hewitt as Chester became known as the 'Arsenal of the North'. Cresswell scored 27 goals as Chester finished runners–up to Port Vale Reserves and were elected to The Football League.

Cresswell had been contracted to West Brom during the season due to the transfer system in place at the time and officially joined Chester in time for their first season in The Football League in part–exchange for the prolific Arthur Gale. Cresswell helped create Chester's first goal in Division Three North against Wigan Borough and played regularly in the number 10 shirt before being transferred to Second Division side Notts County midway through 1933–34 for £2,500. But he returned to Sealand Road at the start of the following season after struggling to settle at his new club.

The 1935–36 season saw Chester finish runners–up in Division Three North, with Cresswell scoring twice in a club record 12–0 win over York City on 1 February 1936. But the following month saw him suffer a broken kneecap in a match against Walsall. Some fans felt this injury cost Chester the championship. He did not play for two years, with five league games in the closing stages of 1937–38 bringing to an end his playing career. This brief return to action included a goal in a 2–1 derby win over Wrexham to take his club league tally to 57, which is Chester's ninth highest in Football League matches.
