= Foster Hedley =

English footballer

Personal information
- Full name: Foster Hedley
- Date of birth: 6 January 1908
- Place of birth: Monkseaton, Whitley Bay, England
- Date of death: 22 December 1983 (aged 75)
- Height: 5 ft 5 1/2 in (1.66 m)
- Position: Outside left

Senior career*
Years	Team	Apps	(Gls)
- St Andrews (Newcastle)
1925	South Shields	0	(0)
- Corinthians (Newcastle)
- Jarrow
1928	Hull City	2	(0)
1929	Nelson	26	(5)
1929	Manchester City	2	(2)
1931–1933	Chester	88	(29)
1934–1935	Tottenham Hotspur	4	(1)
1937–1938	Millwall	12	(6)
1938–1946	Swindon Town	5	(0)
- * Club domestic league appearances and goals

Foster Hedley (6 January 1908 – 1983) was an English professional footballer who played for St Andrews (Newcastle), South Shields, Corinthians (Newcastle), Jarrow, Hull City, Nelson, Manchester City, Chester, Tottenham Hotspur, Millwall and Swindon Town.

== Football career ==
Hedley played for St Andrews (Newcastle), South Shields, Corinthians (Newcastle) and Jarrow before joining Hull City where he participated in two matches in 1928. After spells with Nelson and Manchester City the outside left signed for Chester in 1931 where he went on to feature in 88 games and scoring on 29 occasions. Hedley joined Tottenham Hotspur to play a further five matches and netting once in all competitions. After leaving White Hart Lane he joined Millwall before ending his playing career at Swindon Town where he played 30 matches and scored seven goals in all competitions between 1938–46.
