= Fred Bennett (footballer) =

English footballer

Personal information
- Full name: Frederick Bennett
- Date of birth: 2 October 1906
- Place of birth: Bristol, England
- Date of death: 20 August 1990 (aged 83)
- Place of death: Bristol, England
- Height: 5 ft 8 1/2 in (1.74 m)
- Position: Full back

Senior career*
Years	Team	Apps	(Gls)
- Hanham Athletic
- HJ Packers Ltd.
1925–1930	Bristol Rovers	129	(2)
1930–1935	Chester	158	(1)
1935–1937	Nantwich		(2)
1937–????	Oswestry Town		
Total		287	(3)
- * Club domestic league appearances and goals

Frederick Bennett (2 October 1906 – 20 August 1990) was an English professional footballer who played in the Football League for Bristol Rovers and Chester.

Born in Bristol, Bennett played local non-League football for Hanham Athletic and HJ Packers Ltd., as well as club cricket for Fry's and Packers. He joined Bristol Rovers as a full back in December 1925, and in a four-and-a-half-year stay with the club he made 129 League appearances, scoring twice. In 1930 he joined Chester (later renamed Chester City) when they were a non-League team, but they were elected to the Football League at the end of his first season there. He went on to play 158 League games and scoring a single goal, before moving to Nantwich (now Nantwich Town) in 1935 and Oswestry Town in 1937.

On retiring from football he returned to his home city of Bristol to live, and also served in North Africa during World War II.

== Sources ==
- Jay, Mike; Byrne, Stephen (1994). Pirates in Profile: A Who's Who of Bristol Rovers Players. Bristol: Potten, Baber & Murray. pp. 22–23. ISBN 0-9524835-0-5.
