= John Wallbanks =

English footballer

Personal information
- Date of birth: 7 July 1905
- Place of birth: Hindley, England
- Date of death: 1987 (aged 81–82)
- Position: Forward

Senior career*
Years	Team	Apps	(Gls)
1929–1933	Barnsley	118	(65)
1933	Portsmouth	0	(0)
1933–1935	Chester	38	(36)
1935	Bradford Park Avenue	11	(2)
- Wigan Athletic
- * Club domestic league appearances and goals

John Wallbanks (7 July 1905 – 1987) was an English footballer who played as a forward, Born in Hindley, Wigan.

== Career ==
Wallbanks started his professional career with Barnsley, where he was the club's top goalscorer for four consecutive seasons. He went on to play for Chester and Bradford Park Avenue before joining Wigan Athletic in 1936.
