= Charlie Hewitt (footballer) =

English footballer

Personal information
- Full name: Charles Hewitt
- Date of birth: 10 April 1884
- Place of birth: Connah's Quay, Wales
- Date of death: 31 December 1966 (aged 82)
- Place of death: Chester, England
- Height: 5 ft 6 in (1.68 m)
- Position: Inside forward

Youth career
- West Hartlepool

Senior career*
Years	Team	Apps	(Gls)
1904–1906	Middlesbrough		
1906–1907	Tottenham Hotspur	30	(11)
1907–1908	Liverpool	16	(6)
1908–1910	West Bromwich Albion	60	(26)
1910	Spennymoor United		
1910–1919	Crystal Palace	155	(42)
1919–1922	Hartlepools United	78	(21)

Managerial career
- ?: Mold Alexandra
- 1924–1926: Wrexham
- ?: Flint Town United
- ?: Connah's Quay & Shotton
- 1930–1936: Chester
- 1936–1940: Millwall
- * Club domestic league appearances and goals

Charles Hewitt (10 April 1884 – 31 December 1966) was an English professional football player and manager in the first half of the 20th century. He was in charge of Chester when they entered the Football League in 1931 and managed Millwall to the Football League Division Three South title seven years later.

== Playing career ==
As a player, Hewitt was an inside forward who regularly moved between clubs. He first started professional football with Middlesbrough (1904–06). Hewitt signed to Tottenham Hotspur in May 1906 and his debut was the first Southern League home game of the season against West Ham United which Spurs lost 2–1. He stayed for the duration of the 1906–07 season playing a total of 49 times and scoring 15 goals for the club. He moved to Liverpool for the (1907–08). He joined West Bromwich Albion for a £75 fee in April 1908, making his debut in a Division Two match against Fulham during the same month. He later played for Spennymoor United (May–October 1910), Crystal Palace (1910–15) and Hartlepools United (1919).

== Management years ==
Hewitt then moved into management with North Wales side Mold before joining Football League side Wrexham in November 1924. He led them to Welsh Cup success a year later but left in December 1926 and became manager of non-league side Flint and later Connah's Quay & Shotton where he repeated his Welsh Cup success.

In 1930, Hewitt took over as manager of Cheshire County League side Chester, who were looking to gain election to the Football League. His first season saw the club finish as runners-up, with the side being elected into the league in place of Nelson. Hewitt then established Chester as a force in Football League Division Three North, finishing in the top four in four of their first five seasons. He also led them to Welsh Cup success in 1933.

In April 1936 Hewitt opted to move south and become manager of Football League Division Three South club Millwall, who he guided to promotion and an FA Cup semi final. After being sacked in April 1940, Hewitt returned to football after the war as manager of Leyton Orient. From 1948 to 1956 Hewitt had a second spell in charge of Millwall, for his final job in football. In July 1956 he was awarded £4,500 in damages, relating to his sacking by Millwall six months earlier. He returned to his native north-east and died on New Year's Eve, 1966.

== Works cited ==
- Matthews, Tony (2005). The Who's Who of West Bromwich Albion. Breedon Books. ISBN 1-85983-474-4.
- Turner, Dennis; White, Alex (1993). The Breedon Book of Football Managers. Breedon Books. ISBN 1-873626-32-0.
- Goodwin, Bob (1992). The Spurs Alphabet. ACL & Polar Publishing (UK) Ltd. ISBN 0-9514862-8-4.
