= List of Nelson F.C. players =

Nelson F.C. is an English semi-professional association football club based in the town of Nelson, Lancashire. The club was founded in 1881 and initially played in the Lancashire Combination. In 1921, Nelson became a professional outfit when they were one of the teams selected to play in the inaugural season of the newly formed Football League Third Division North. The team played in the Football League for the following 10 years, enjoying a season in the Second Division in 1923–24. Nelson were relegated from the Football League in 1931, failing re-election after finishing bottom of the league. Defender Clement Rigg amassed the most league appearances for Nelson during this period with 254. The highest goalscorer was Joe Eddleston who netted on 97 occasions for the club before transferring to Swindon Town in 1926.

This list includes all the players who made at least one league appearance for Nelson during this professional period. Appearances and goals are counted together for players who had more than one spell with the club during this time.

== Players ==
Joseph Birds

David Wilson

Name	Nationality	Position	Nelson career	Appearances	Goals
Harry Abbott	England	GK	1922–1927	154	0
Frank Allen	England	FW	1930	14	0
Harold Andrews	England	FW	1921–1922	8	1
Frank Bailey	England	DF	1925–1927	4	0
Richard Baird	England	MF	1921–1922	2	0
Jim Baker	England	DF	1926–1927	28	6
Len Baker	England	FW	1930–1931	7	0
Joseph Baldwin	England	FW	1929–1930	1	0
Arthur Bate	England	MF	1930–1931	24	6
Lewis Bedford	England	MF	1927–1928	32	7
William Bennett	England	FW	1922–1923	1	0
John Bennie	Scotland	FW	1921–1922	12	6
Joseph Birds	England	GK	1922–1924	40	0
John Black	Scotland	DF	1922–1923	29	5
William Bossons	England	GK	1927–1928	4	0
Lewis Botto	England	GK	1929–1930	1	0
Allan Bottrill	England	MF	1924–1925	1	0
Billy Bottrill	England	FW	1924–1928	121	35
Ernie Braidwood	England	DF	1922–1926	128	10
Jimmy Broadhead	England	DF	1922–1926; 1927–1928	67	1
Fred Broadhurst	England	DF	1925–1927	61	0
Jack Brooks	England	DF	1929	6	0
Alfred Brown	England	DF	1927–1928	2	0
John Brown	Scotland	MF	1926–1927	2	0
Robert Bruce	Scotland	GK	1921–1922	7	0
Jim Buchanan	Scotland	FW	1928–1930	66	15
Herbert Butterworth	England	DF	1924–1926	9	0
James Caine	England	DF	1929–1931	5	0
Eddie Cameron	Scotland	FW	1924–1925; 1929	46	10
Tom Carmedy	England	FW	1928–1931	66	20
Billy Caulfield	England	FW	1923–1924	18	5
Edgar Chadwick	England	FW	1923–1926	36	19
Walter Chadwick	England	DF	1925–1926	2	0
Ralph Chapman	England	MF	1929–1931	10	0
Harry Clayton	England	DF	1925–1926	4	0
Harry Clegg	England	GK	1921–1922	5	0
David Cochrane	Scotland	FW	1927–1928	2	2
Leigh Collins	England	DF	1923–1924	13	0
Harry Counsell	England	DF	1930–1931	3	0
Jimmy Cowen	England	FW	1925–1926	3	4
Dick Crawshaw	England	FW	1922–1924	32	10
James Dargan	England	FW	1927–1928	2	0
Arthur Dawson	England	MF	1930–1931	10	0
Wilf Denwood	England	MF	1925–1926	3	0
Charlie Dixon	England	DF	1930–1931	16	1
Ernie Dixon	England	FW	1929–1930	28	10
John Dodsworth	England	DF	1928–1929	2	0
Billy Donkin	England	DF	1928–1929	8	0
Edwin Earle	England	MF	1925–1927	54	15
Eddie Eastwood	England	DF	1921–1923	3	0
Joe Eddleston	England	FW	1921–1926	183	97
Bill Ellerington	England	DF	1924–1925	26	2
Billy Fairhurst	England	DF	1929–1931	76	0
Des Fawcett	England	GK	1928–1929	23	0
Robert Ferguson	England	FW	1929–1930	1	0
Ted Ferguson	England	DF	1928–1930	67	0
Fred Ferrari	England	FW	1929–1930	7	3
Jack Fletcher	England	MF	1927–1929	11	1
Thomas Garnett	England	MF	1921–1922	1	0
Bob Gartside	England	FW	1929–1930	1	0
Richard Gaskell	England	FW	1927–1928	3	0
Felix Gillan	England	DF	1928–1929	11	0
Ernest Gillibrand	England	MF	1924–1925	2	0
Billy Halligan	Ireland	FW	1921–1922	17	6
Joe Halliwell	England	FW	1927–1929	74	9
Jimmy Hampson	England	FW	1925–1927	64	42
Harry Hargreaves	England	FW	1921	13	2
Billy Harker	England	FW	1930–1931	18	5
Billy Harper	England	DF	1924–1925	6	0
Ambrose Harris	England	DF	1924–1928	58	1
Ray Hartley	England	DF	1921–1922	1	0
Arthur Hawes	England	FW	1930–1931	26	3
George Hayes	Wales	FW	1927–1928	9	5
Foster Hedley	England	MF	1929–1930	26	5
Arthur Hepworth	England	MF	1927–1929	16	0
Harry Heyes	England	GK	1921–1922	26	0
Harry Higginbotham	Scotland	FW	1924	4	0
Charlie Hillam	England	GK	1930–1931	3	0
Sid Hoad	England	MF	1922–1927	152	13
Alec Hooper	England	DF	1928–1929	9	0
Harry Hooper	England	DF	1928–1930	21	0
Archie Howarth	England	MF	1930–1931	8	2
George Howes	England	DF	1930–1931	35	0
Charles Howson	England	DF	1922–1923	1	0
Duggie Humphrey	England	MF	1924	8	0
Bob Hutchinson	England	MF	1922–1924	60	1
Thomas Jacques	England	DF	1921–1922	17	1
John Jewell	England	MF	1930–1931	3	0
Arthur Jones	England	DF	1927–1928	1	0
Jack Jones	England	DF	1927–1928	12	0
John Keers	England	MF	1926–1927	8	3
Gerry Kelly	England	MF	1928–1929	47	15
Sam Kennedy	England	FW	1923–1924	6	0
William Lammus	England	DF	1923–1924	8	0
Fred Laycock	England	FW	1924–1925	23	12
Bob Lilley	England	DF	1921–1925	66	0
Tom Lilley	England	DF	1923–1924	14	0
Fred Mace	England	GK	1925–1927	8	0
James Mangham	England	GK	1927–1930	2	0
Edward Manock	England	FW	1929–1931	18	2
Cecil Marsh	England	FW	1921–1922	17	2
Jack Martin	England	DF	1930–1931	27	1
David McClure	Scotland	DF	1927–1928	28	1
Mike McCulloch	Scotland	FW	1922–1924	49	8
Patrick McDonagh	Scotland	FW	1928–1929	5	0
William McGreevy	England	FW	1921–1922	3	1
John McGuire	England	FW	1927–1928	20	2
Jimmy McKinnell	Scotland	DF	1929–1930	10	0
George McLaughlan	Scotland	FW	1929–1930	29	2
Harry Mellor	England	FW	1921–1922	1	0
Jim Metcalfe	England	DF	1928–1930	71	1
Ronald Mitchell	England	DF	1926–1927	32	0
Walter Moore	England	DF	1924–1925	5	0
William Morton	England	FW	1928–1929	8	3
Jack Newnes	Wales	DF	1923–1926	113	7
Robert Nuttall	England	FW	1930–1931	4	0
Harry Nutter	England	GK	1923–1924	2	0
Joseph O'Beirne	England	FW	1924–1925	16	2
Frank Parry	England	MF	1929–1930	24	2
James Pearson	England	DF	1925–1928	38	0
James Phizacklea	England	DF	1924–1925	19	0
Tom Pickering	England	FW	1926–1927	1	0
James Price	Scotland	DF	1921–1923	24	0
Wilfred Proctor	England	MF	1921–1922	14	1
Bernard Radford	England	FW	1927–1929	55	41
Leslie Raisbeck	England	FW	1930–1931	29	11
Gilbert Richmond	England	DF	1929–1931	21	0
Dennis Ridge	England	DF	1927–1928	8	0
Harry Ridley	England	MF	1928–1929	31	7
Clement Rigg	England	DF	1921–1929	254	4
Percy Roberts	Wales	FW	1926–1927	1	0
Ernie Robinson	England	DF	1930–1931	27	0
Henry Robinson	England	MF	1930–1931	20	3
Teddy Roseboom	Scotland	FW	1923–1924	12	1
Bill Ruffell	England	FW	1927–1928	12	3
Charles Sandbach	England	DF	1930–1931	2	0
Buchanan Sharp	Scotland	FW	1926–1929	80	35
Peter Shevlin	Scotland	GK	1929–1931	53	0
Edwin Simpson	England	DF	1926–1928	17	0
Bill Slack	England	DF	1927–1928	10	3
Fred Smith	England	FW	1924–1926	2	0
Steve Spargo	England	DF	1929–1930	21	0
George Spence	England	MF	1927–1928	13	2
John Steel	Scotland	DF	1921–1923	50	0
John Stevenson	Scotland	FW	1924–1927	73	26
John Stoneham	England	GK	1927–1928	6	0
David Suttie	Scotland	DF	1928–1931	104	2
Harold Taylor	England	MF	1926–1928	17	4
Tommy Tebb	England	FW	1930–1931	14	2
Jim Thomson	Scotland	GK	1924	2	0
Harry Tordoff	England	DF	1928–1930	9	0
Albert Turner	England	DF	1921–1922	1	0
Stan Walker	England	FW	1930–1931	2	0
William Waller	England	FW	1921–1922	25	7
John Walmsley	England	DF	1921–1922	1	0
Ted Ward	England	FW	1923–1924	2	0
Sam Warhurst	England	GK	1927–1931	76	0
John Weedall	England	MF	1929–1930	7	3
Henry White	England	FW	1927–1928	22	15
Bob Wilde	England	DF	1921–1922	36	0
Tom Wilkinson	England	FW	1928–1929	17	5
David Wilson	Scotland	DF	1921–1924	95	3
George Wilson	England	DF	1925–1930	160	16
Billy Wilson	England	MF	1921–1922	1	0
Arthur Wolstenholme	England	FW	1922–1925	68	17
James Wootton	England	MF	1921–1922	14	1
