= 1924–25 Nelson F.C. season =

Nelson
1924–25 season
- Manager: David Wilson
- Stadium: Seedhill
- Football League Third Division North: Second
- FA Cup: Sixth qualifying round
- Top goalscorer: League: Joe Eddleston (25); All: Joe Eddleston (26)
- Highest home attendance: 13,500 (vs Darlington, 4 April 1925)
- Lowest home attendance: 4,000 (vs Rotherham County, 20 December 1924)
- Average home league attendance: 6,152
Home colours

The 1924–25 season was the 44th in the history of Nelson Football Club, and their fourth as a professional team in the Football League. The campaign saw the team return to the Third Division North, having finished in the relegation zone of the Second Division in 1923–24. Despite losing only one match all season at Seedhill, Nelson's home ground, the team struggled in away matches. Nelson ended the campaign on 53 points, with a record of 23 wins, 7 draws and 12 losses, and finished as runners-up to Darlington in the league table. Nelson reached the sixth qualifying round of the FA Cup, beating non-League Winsford United before being knocked out of the competition by Coventry City. The team progressed past the first round of the Lancashire Senior Cup with a win against Wigan Borough, but were defeated in the following round by Blackburn Rovers.

A total of 23 different players were used by Nelson during their 44 competitive matches, less than half of whom had played for the club in previous campaigns. Goalkeeper Harry Abbott and half-back Ernie Braidwood were the two ever-presents for Nelson during 1924–25. Centre forward Joe Eddleston scored 26 goals in 43 games to become the team's top goalscorer for the fourth consecutive season. Two Nelson records were set during the campaign, although one was later broken; the seven-goal winning margin against Crewe Alexandra was never bettered in Football League matches, while the attendance of 13,500 for the visit of Darlington in April 1925 was the largest ever seen at Seedhill at that time.

== Background ==
The 1924–25 season marked Nelson's return to the Football League Third Division North following their relegation from the Second Division at the end of the previous campaign. It was the club's fourth season in the Football League, having previously competed in the Central League. Former Scotland international defender David Wilson retired from his player-manager role in the summer of 1924 in order to take up the managerial post full-time. Thomas Jacques, who had played for Nelson during their inaugural season in the Football League, was hired as the assistant coach and groundsman. Unlike the previous summer, when Nelson had embarked on a pre-season tour of Spain, the team did not play any friendly matches during the build-up to the campaign. The club strip remained unchanged from the previous season; a blue jersey, white shorts and black socks with white and blue trim.

While there were several changed to the playing staff, the core of the team that had played in the Second Division remained intact. Centre forward Joe Eddleston, Nelson's top goalscorer in each of the previous three seasons, was retained along with captain Clem Rigg, Welsh half-back Jack Newnes and goalkeeper Harry Abbott. The two most senior squad members, David Wilson and goalkeeper Joseph Birds, retired from professional football aged 40 and 36 respectively. Inside forward Dick Crawshaw, who had been the team's second-highest scorer in 1923–24 with five goals, moved to Stalybridge Celtic. Scottish forward Mike McCulloch ended his two-year association with the club by joining Chesterfield on a free transfer, while half-back Leigh Collins signed for New Brighton. Other players, including William Lammus and Ernest Gillibrand, left Nelson having failed to establish themselves in the first-team during their time with the club. Manager Wilson spent a total of £750 (£27,000 as of 2011) on new players in the summer of 1924. Billy Bottrill and Bill Ellerington arrived from Middlesbrough, while Barrow full-back James Phizacklea was signed to bolster the defensive line. Several young players were acquired from local non-League football during the close season, including Ambrose Harris from Briercliffe and Billy Harper, formerly of Feniscowles. The Nelson squad was considered by the local newspaper to be stronger than the one which had won the Third Division North two seasons earlier.

=== Transfers ===
In
Player	From	Fee	Date
Billy Bottrill	Middlesbrough	£250	June 1924
Bill Ellerington	Middlesbrough	£350	June 1924
Joseph O'Beirne	Burnley	£150	June 1924
James Phizacklea	Barrow	Free	June 1924
Billy Harper	Feniscowles	Free	August 1924
Ambrose Harris	Briercliffe	Free	August 1924
Fred Smith	Barnoldswick Town	Free	November 1924
Allan Bottrill	Middlesbrough	Free	January 1925
Fred Laycock	Barrow	£70	March 1925
John Stevenson	Bury	£500	March 1925

Out
Player	To	Fee	Date
Joseph Birds	Retired	–	May 1924
David Wilson	Retired	–	May 1924
Dick Crawshaw	Stalybridge Celtic	Free	June 1924
Mike McCulloch	Chesterfield	Free	June 1924
Leigh Collins	New Brighton	Free	July 1924
William Lammus	Nuneaton Town	Free	July 1924
Ernest Gillibrand	Rossendale United	Free	August 1924
Tom Lilley	Hartlepools United	Free	August 1924
Billy Caulfield	Crewe Alexandra	Free	September 1924
Sam Kennedy	Fulham	Free	October 1924
Ted Ward	Darlington	Free	December 1924
James Phizacklea	Preston North End	£1,000	January 1925

== Football League Third Division North ==
David Wilson led Nelson to eight successive home wins at the start of the 1924–25 campaign.

Nelson began their league campaign on 30 August 1924 with an away match at Southport, who had ended the previous season in seventh position. New signings Billy Bottrill, Bill Ellerington and Joseph O'Beirne went straight into the starting line-up but they could not prevent Southport winning by a single goal from Jack Barber, giving them their first ever League win against Nelson. A week later, Nelson played their first home game of the season, in which James Phizacklea made his debut for the club. A crowd of around 6,000 saw Ashington beaten 4–0 thanks to goals from Bottrill, Joe Eddleston, Jack Newnes and Sid Hoad. Three days later, Eddleston scored twice as Doncaster Rovers were defeated by three goals to nil in the first midweek match of the campaign. However, Nelson could not continue their winning streak as they lost 0–2 against Accrington Stanley at Peel Park in the following fixture. On 16 September, Nelson achieved their biggest victory in the Football League at that time with a 7–1 win over Durham City at Seedhill. The game saw Eddleston score his first hat-trick since the 3–0 victory away at Rochdale in January 1923, and O'Beirne and Eddie Cameron score their first goals of the season. Four days later, Nelson suffered their third consecutive defeat away from home, losing 0–3 to Barrow at Holker Street. The team continued their good home form the following week with a narrow win against Lincoln City. Nelson named the same team for the seventh game in succession for the trip to Tranmere Rovers on 4 October, but the side were beaten for the fourth straight away match thanks to goals from Dixie Dean and Jimmy Moreton.

A week later Eddleston took his tally of goals to eight, scoring twice as Nelson overcame Walsall 2–1 at Seedhill. He scored again in the next match as the team gained their first point of the season away from home, drawing 1–1 at Wigan Borough, who had been Nelson's first ever opponents in the Football League over three years previously. Half-back Ernie Braidwood scored his first goal of the campaign in the 2–1 win against Halifax Town. Eddie Cameron also scored for the home side, and Walter Moore made his senior debut in the match. November began badly for Nelson as they suffered their heaviest defeat of the season, a 0–5 loss away at New Brighton. Allan Mathieson and Joe Wilcox scored two goals each as New Brighton won the first ever competitive meeting between the two sides. Nelson moved up to sixth place in the league following the next match, a 1–0 win at home to Grimsby Town. However, the team continued their poor form away from Seedhill, losing 1–3 to table-topping Darlington on 15 November. Seven days later, Bottrill scored the only goal of the match as Nelson beat Rochdale to record their eighth consecutive home win.

In the first game of December, Nelson failed to win at Seedhill for the first time in the season. Despite a tenth goal of the campaign from Eddleston and a penalty kick scored by captain Clem Rigg, the team could only draw with Bradford Park Avenue. After a two-week break from League football because of the FA Cup, Nelson returned to action with a 4–1 home win over Rotherham County in the only match ever played between the two sides at Seedhill. On Christmas Day, half-back Ambrose Harris made his first appearance for Nelson as the side beat Chesterfield 1–0 thanks to Bill Ellerington's first goal for the club. The same team was defeated by the same scoreline the following day in the reverse fixture at Saltergate. Inside forward Arthur Wolstenholme scored the only goal of the match as Nelson recorded their first away victory of the season in the final fixture of 1924.

Nelson started the new year with a 1–1 draw at Ashington; Ellerington scored for the second time in three matches but it was cancelled out by a goal from Bill Watson. A week later, half-back Ernie Braidwood netted his first of the season as the team secured another 1–1 draw away at Wrexham's Racecourse Ground. In the first home match of the new year, on 17 January 1925, Nelson atoned for their defeat to Accrington Stanley earlier in the season with a 4–1 win thanks to two goals from Eddleston, one from Chadwick, and a first goal in almost three months for Cameron. Clem Rigg scored two penalties the following week as the side beat Barrow to move above Bradford Park Avenue into fifth position in the Third Division North. On 7 February Nelson won their third consecutive home fixture, beating Tranmere Rovers by four goals to one. Left-half Herbert Butterworth made his senior debut for the club against Tranmere, despite signing from Wolverhampton Wanderers almost two years previously, while Chadwick scored twice in one game for the first time. A trip to Walsall seven days later brought a first away victory of 1925 for the team as goals from Chadwick and Hoad gave Nelson a 2–1 win, which elevated them to third place in the league. A narrow win against Wigan Borough at Seedhill on 21 February lifted Nelson further up the table into second position, behind only Darlington. The team ended a successful February with a fourth victory of the month, beating Halifax Town 4–2 before a crowd of 10,000 spectators at The Shay.

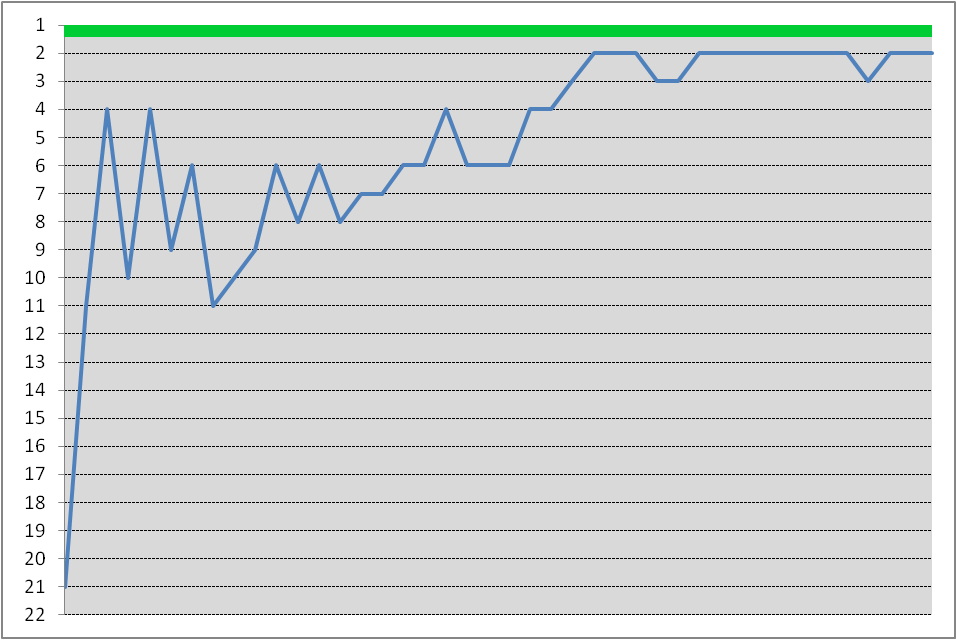
Chart showing Nelson's league position throughout the 1924–25 season

Nelson carried their good form into March; Bottrill scored for the first time in over two months to help the team defeat New Brighton by five clear goals. This seventh straight win closed the gap between Nelson and Darlington to five points, with the league leaders having played three more matches. In an attempt to push for the title the Nelson directors invested in two new players in March; inside forward John Stevenson arrived from Second Division side Bury for a fee of £500, while Fred Laycock joined Nelson from Barrow. However, the team suffered their first loss of 1925 in of the following match away at Grimsby Town as goals from Joe Cooper and Frank McKenna gave the home side a 2–0 win. This was followed by another defeat four days later; a goal on debut for Stevenson could not prevent Lincoln City winning by two goals to one. On 21 March Nelson returned to winning ways with a 2–0 defeat of Hartlepools United at Seedhill, and later the same week Eddleston scored his second hat-trick of the campaign as struggling Hartlepools were beaten 4–2 in the reverse fixture. A first goal in Nelson colours for Laycock secured a third successive win away at Rochdale on 28 March.

A then-record crowd of 13,500 descended on Seedhill for the visit of Darlington on 4 April, but the top two teams in the division could not be separated as the game finished in a 1–1 draw. Nelson remained second in the table going into the Easter period, during which teams played four matches in the space of five days. The first of these games ended in a 2–1 defeat away at Crewe Alexandra, despite Newnes' first goal since September. John Stevenson then scored his second Nelson goal the following day in a 1–1 draw with Bradford Park Avenue. On 13 April, the team avenged their loss to Crewe with a comprehensive 7–0 victory at Seedhill, their biggest winning margin in the Football League. Joe Eddleston opened the scoring and went on to net his third hat-trick of the season, taking his tally of goals to 25, a total that would never be beaten during Nelson's time in the League. The other goals were added by Laycock, who scored twice, Chadwick and Cameron, who netted his last goal for Nelson. However, the team then took just three out of an available ten points at the end of the season, ending their hopes of returning to the Second Division. Following a 1–1 draw at Doncaster Rovers, Nelson suffered their first and only home defeat of the season, losing 4–2 to Wrexham. On 21 September the team achieved their final win of the campaign, beating Southport 2–1 thanks to two goals from Laycock. The 1924–25 season ended with consecutive away losses at Durham City and bottom-of-the-league Rotherham County, leaving Nelson with second in the Third Division North on 53 points, ahead of third-placed New Brighton on goal average.

=== Match results ===
Key

- In Result column, Nelson's score shown first
- H = Home match
- A = Away match
- — = Attendance not known^{[nb 1]}
- pen. = Penalty kick
- o.g. = Own goal

Results

Date	Opponents	Result	Goalscorers	Attendance
30 August 1924	Southport (A)	0–1		8,000
6 September 1924	Ashington (H)	4–0	B. Bottrill, Eddleston, Hoad, Newnes	6,000
9 September 1924	Doncaster Rovers (H)	3–0	B. Bottrill, Eddleston (2)	5,000
13 September 1924	Accrington Stanley (A)	0–2		9,000
16 September 1924	Durham City (H)	7–1	B. Bottrill, Cameron, Eddleston (3), Newnes (pen.), O'Beirne	5,000
20 September 1924	Barrow (A)	0–3		8,000
27 September 1924	Lincoln City (H)	1–0	O'Beirne	7,000
4 October 1924	Tranmere Rovers (A)	0–2		7,000
11 October 1924	Walsall (H)	2–1	Eddleston (2)	7,000
18 October 1924	Wigan Borough (A)	1–1	Eddleston	15,000
25 October 1924	Halifax Town (H)	2–1	Cameron	10,000
1 November 1924	New Brighton (A)	0–5		4,000
8 November 1924	Grimsby Town (H)	1–0	B. Bottrill	6,000
15 November 1924	Darlington (A)	1–3	Wolstenholme	7,000
22 November 1924	Rochdale (H)	1–0	B. Bottrill	5,000
6 December 1924	Bradford Park Avenue (H)	2–2	Eddleston, Rigg (pen.)	6,000
20 December 1924	Rotherham County (H)	4–1	B. Bottrill, Chadwick, Eddleston (2)	4,000
25 December 1924	Chesterfield (H)	1–0	Ellerington	6,000
8 November 1924	Chesterfield (A)	1–0	Wolstenholme	9,000
3 January 1925	Ashington (A)	1–1	Ellerington	4,245
10 January 1925	Wrexham (A)	1–1	Braidwood	5,000
17 January 1925	Accrington Stanley (H)	4–1	Cameron, Chadwick, Eddleston (2)	6,000
24 January 1925	Barrow (H)	2–0	Rigg (2 pen.)	5,000
7 February 1925	Tranmere Rovers (H)	4–1	Cameron, Chadwick (2), Rigg (pen.)	4,000
14 February 1925	Walsall (A)	2–1	Chadwick, Hoad	4,000
21 February 1925	Wigan Borough (H)	1–0	Braidwood	6,000
28 February 1925	Halifax Town (A)	4–2	B. Bottrill, Cameron, Chadwick, Eddleston	10,000
7 March 1925	New Brighton (H)	5–0	B. Bottrill, Chadwick, Eddleston (2), Hoad	6,000
14 March 1925	Grimsby Town (A)	0–2		5,000
18 March 1925	Lincoln City (A)	1–2	Stevenson	—
21 March 1925	Hartlepools United (H)	2–0	Chadwick, Eddleston	6,000
25 March 1925	Hartlepools United (A)	4–2	Cameron, Eddleston (3)	1,500
28 March 1925	Rochdale (A)	1–0	Laycock	8,000
4 April 1925	Darlington (H)	1–1	Eddleston	13,500
10 April 1925	Crewe Alexandra (A)	1–2	Newnes	7,000
11 April 1925	Bradford Park Avenue (A)	1–1	Stevenson	10,000
13 April 1925	Crewe Alexandra (H)	7–0	Cameron, Chadwick, Eddleston (3), Laycock (2)	6,000
14 April 1925	Doncaster Rovers (A)	1–1	Stevenson	4,000
18 April 1925	Wrexham (H)	2–4	Laycock (2)	5,000
21 April 1925	Southport (H)	2–1	Laycock (2)	6,000
25 April 1925	Rotherham County (A)	0–1		4,000
29 April 1925	Durham City (A)	1–3	Chadwick	2,000

=== Final league position ===
Pos	Team	Pld	W	D	L	GF	GA	GAv	Pts	Qualification
1	Darlington (C, P)	42	24	10	8	78	33	2.364	58	Promotion to the Second Division
2	Nelson	42	23	7	12	79	50	1.580	53	
3	New Brighton	42	23	7	12	75	50	1.500	53	
4	Southport	42	22	7	13	59	37	1.595	51	
5	Bradford (Park Avenue)	42	19	12	11	84	42	2.000	50	

Source: rsssf.com
(C) Champions; (P) Promoted

== Other first-team matches ==
Nelson's first match outside the league in the 1924–25 season came in the Lancashire Senior Cup. The team entered the competition in the first round, and were drawn against Wigan Borough at Seedhill. Nelson progressed to the next stage of the cup with a comprehensive 4–0 win and were handed another home tie in the second round, against First Division side Blackburn Rovers. A 2–1 win for the away team ended Nelson's participation in the cup for the season.

Nelson entered the FA Cup, the foremost cup competition in England, in the fifth qualifying round along with all the other teams in the Third Division North. For their first match, played on 29 November 1924, the team was drawn to play Winsford United of the Cheshire County League at Seedhill. Nelson won the first ever meeting between the two clubs 4–1 with goals from Braidwood, Eddleston, O'Beirne and Wolstenholme, to progress to the sixth qualifying round for the first time in three years. In the next round Nelson were again given a home tie, against Second Division outfit Coventry City, who would be relegated to the Third Division North at the end of the 1924–25 campaign. Nelson made only one change from the side that had defeated Winsford, with Eddie Cameron replacing Arthur Wolstenholme. In front of a crowd of 7,000 spectators, one of the highest attendances at Seedhill of the season, Coventry won 1–0 to progress to the first round proper of the competition.

=== Match results ===
Results

Competition	Round	Date	Opponents	Result	Goalscorers	Attendance
Lancashire Senior Cup	First round	23 September 1924	Wigan Borough (H)	4–0	—	—
Lancashire Senior Cup	Second round	7 October 1924	Blackburn Rovers (H)	1–2	—	—
FA Cup	Fifth qualifying round	29 November 1924	Winsford United (H)	4–1	Braidwood, Eddleston, O'Beirne, Wolstenholme	4,000
FA Cup	Sixth qualifying round	13 December 1924	Coventry City (H)	0–1		7,000

== Player details ==
Nelson used a total of 23 players during the 1924–25 season and there were 13 different goalscorers. There were also four squad members who did not make a first-team appearance in the campaign. The team played in a 2–3–5 formation (the standard formation at the time) throughout the campaign, with two full-backs, three half-backs, two outside forwards, two inside forwards and a centre forward. Two players, goalkeeper Harry Abbott and half-back Ernie Braidwood, appeared in all 44 Third Division and FA Cup matches. Joe Eddleston missed just one game, the defeat against Durham City on 29 April, while Welsh international Jack Newnes made 42 appearances in the season. Two players played only once during the season; Fred Smith deputised for Edgar Chadwick at inside-left in the win against Southport on 21 April, and Allan Bottrill appeared in the final match of the season in place of Eddleston. Neither ever played another senior match for the club.

The team scored a total of 88 goals in all competitions. The highest scorer was Eddleston, with 26 goals, followed by Chadwick, who scored 10 goals in 20 outings. Billy Bottrill netted eight times during his first season as a Nelson player, while Fred Laycock scored seven despite only playing for the last two months of the campaign. Club captain Clem Rigg was the highest-scoring defender, netting four penalties.

=== Statistics ===
Key to positions

- CF = Centre forward
- FB = Fullback
- HB = Defender
- GK = Goalkeeper
- IF = Inside forward
- OF = Outside forward

Statistics

Nat.	Position	Player	Third Division North		FA Cup		Total
Nat.	Position	Player	Apps	Goals	Apps	Goals	Apps	Goals
(England)	GK	Harry Abbott	42	0	2	0	44	0
(England)	OF	Allan Bottrill	1	0	0	0	1	0
(England)	IF	Billy Bottrill	29	8	2	0	31	8
(England)	HB	Ernie Braidwood	42	3	2	1	44	4
(England)	HB	Jimmy Broadhead	3	0	0	0	3	0
(England)	HB	Herbert Butterworth	7	0	0	0	7	0
(Scotland)	OF	Eddie Cameron	38	7	1	0	39	7
(England)	IF	Edgar Chadwick	20	10	0	0	20	10
(England)	CF	Joe Eddleston	41	25	2	1	42	26
(England)	HB	Bill Ellerington	26	2	2	0	28	2
(England)	FB	Billy Harper	6	0	0	0	6	0
(England)	HB	Ambrose Harris	8	0	0	0	8	0
(England)	OF	Sid Hoad	31	3	2	0	33	3
(England)	OF	Duggie Humphrey	0	0	0	0	0	0
(England)	IF	Fred Laycock	12	7	0	0	12	7
(England)	FB	Bob Lilley	17	0	0	0	17	0
(England)	GK	Laurence Lunn	0	0	0	0	0	0
(England)	OF	Walter Moore	5	0	0	0	5	0
(Wales)	HB	Jack Newnes	40	3	2	0	42	3
(England)	IF	Joseph O'Beirne	16	2	2	1	18	3
(England)	FB	James Phizacklea	19	0	2	0	21	0
(England)	FB	Clem Rigg	38	4	2	0	40	4
(England)	IF	Fred Smith	1	0	0	0	1	0
(Scotland)	IF	John Stevenson	13	3	0	0	13	3
(Scotland)	GK	Jim Thomson	0	0	0	0	0	0
(England)	IF	Ted Ward	0	0	0	0	0	0
(England)	IF	Arthur Wolstenholme	7	2	1	1	8	3

== See also ==
- List of Nelson F.C. seasons

== Notes ==
1. Until the 1925–26 season, match attendances in the Football League were not officially recorded.
