= 1923–24 Nelson F.C. season =

Nelson F.C.
1923–24 season
- Manager: David Wilson
- Football League Second Division: 21st (relegated)
- FA Cup: Fifth Qualifying Round
- Top goalscorer: League: Joe Eddleston (14); All: Joe Eddleston (14)
- Highest home attendance: 12,000 (vs Clapton Orient, 25 August 1923)
- Lowest home attendance: 4,000 (vs Wigan Borough, 5 December 1923)
Home colours

The 1923–24 season was the 43rd season in the history of Nelson F.C. and their third as a professional club in the Football League. The team competed in the Second Division of the Football League for the first time, having won promotion as champions of the Third Division North in the previous campaign. Nelson struggled against more established opponents in the higher league, and were relegated at the end of the season, finishing second-bottom of the division just a point behind Fulham, who avoided relegation. Despite achieving a 1–0 victory away against Manchester United, Nelson suffered several heavy defeats during the campaign, including a 0–6 loss to Derby County, and at one point went six matches without scoring a goal. Nelson ended the season on 33 points, with a record of 10 wins, 13 draws and 19 defeats in 42 matches.

Nelson entered the FA Cup in the Fifth Qualifying Round, and were knocked out in a replay at that stage by Wigan Borough, having drawn the original tie. A total of 30 players were used by Nelson throughout their 44 first-team matches. The majority of the championship-winning team remained with Nelson. New signings included defender Jack Newnes, who went on to become a Wales international, Billy Caulfield and Eddie Cameron. With 14 goals in 42 appearances, Joe Eddleston was the team's top goalscorer for the third season in succession, and also played the highest number of matches of all the first-team squad. The highest attendance of the season at the club's Seedhill stadium was 12,000 on two occasions, the first of these the opening day game against Clapton Orient on 26 August 1923. The lowest attendance in the league was 7,000 for three different matches, while the FA Cup replay against Wigan Borough attracted a crowd of only 4,000 spectators.

== Background ==
In the 1922–23 season, Nelson had been crowned champions of the Football League Third Division North after winning 24 of their 38 league fixtures. In May 1923, the club embarked on a pre-season tour of Spain. Six matches were played during the trip, two each against Real Madrid, Racing de Santander and Real Oviedo. On 15 May 1923, Nelson achieved a 4–2 victory against Real Madrid at the Campo de Ciudad Lineal, two of the goals coming from Dick Crawshaw, who had been signed towards the end of the previous campaign. In doing so, Nelson became the first English club to defeat Real Madrid at their home ground.

== Football League Second Division ==
=== Match results ===
Key

- In Result column, Nelson's score shown first
- H = Home match
- A = Away match
- — = Attendance not known
- o.g. = Own goal

Results

| Date | Opponents | Result | Goalscorers | Attendance |
|---|---|---|---|---|
| 25 August 1923 | Clapton Orient (H) | 1–1 | McCulloch | 12,000 |
| 27 August 1923 | Stockport County (A) | 0–1 | | 11,000 |
| 1 September 1923 | Clapton Orient (A) | 1–5 | Eddleston | 20,000 |
| 3 September 1923 | Stockport County (H) | 1–1 | Wolstenholme | 10,000 |
| 8 September 1923 | Hull City (A) | 1–2 | Eddleston | 9,000 |
| 11 September 1923 | Southampton (H) | 0–0 | | 12,000 |
| 15 September 1923 | Hull City (H) | 1–1 | Eddleston | 11,000 |
| 22 September 1923 | Stoke (A) | 0–4 | | 14,000 |
| 29 September 1923 | Stoke (H) | 2–0 | Newnes, Eddleston | 10,000 |
| 6 October 1923 | Crystal Palace (A) | 1–1 | Roseboom | 10,000 |
| 13 October 1923 | Crystal Palace (H) | 4–2 | Crawshaw (3), Hoad | 10,000 |
| 20 October 1923 | Sheffield Wednesday (H) | 1–1 | Crawshaw | — |
| 27 October 1923 | Sheffield Wednesday (A) | 0–5 | | 10,000 |
| 3 November 1923 | Coventry City (H) | 3–0 | Caulfield (2), Eddleston | 6,000 |
| 10 November 1923 | Coventry City (A) | 0–4 | | 12,000 |
| 17 November 1923 | Bristol City (A) | 0–1 | | 8,000 |
| 24 November 1923 | Bristol City (H) | 2–1 | Eddleston (2) | 8,000 |
| 8 December 1923 | Southampton (A) | 0–3 | | 11,000 |
| 15 December 1923 | Fulham (A) | 0–0 | | 13,000 |
| 22 December 1923 | Fulham (H) | 1–1 | Braidwood | 6,000 |
| 25 December 1923 | Derby County (H) | 2–1 | Newnes, Hoad | 10,000 |
| 26 December 1923 | Derby County (A) | 0–6 | | 16,000 |
| 29 December 1923 | Blackpool (A) | 1–1 | Eddleston | 15,000 |
| 5 January 1924 | Blackpool (H) | 2–3 | Caulfield, Wolstenholme | 10,000 |
| 19 January 1924 | Oldham Athletic (H) | 2–1 | Newnes, Eddleston | 9,000 |
| 26 January 1924 | Oldham Athletic (A) | 0–1 | | 12,000 |
| 2 February 1924 | South Shields (H) | 0–2 | | 7,000 |
| 9 February 1924 | South Shields (A) | 0–3 | | 8,000 |
| 16 February 1924 | Bury (H) | 0–5 | | 8,500 |
| 23 February 1924 | Bury (A) | 0–2 | | 8,000 |
| 1 March 1924 | Manchester United (H) | 0–2 | | 7,000 |
| 8 March 1924 | Manchester United (A) | 1–0 | Crawshaw | 18,000 |
| 15 March 1924 | Barnsley (A) | 0–0 | | 8,000 |
| 22 March 1924 | Barnsley (H) | 4–3 | Caulfield (2), Eddleston, Hoad | 7,000 |
| 29 March 1924 | Bradford City (A) | 2–0 | Cameron, Eddleston | 10,000 |
| 5 April 1924 | Bradford City (H) | 1–1 | Cameron | 8,000 |
| 12 April 1924 | Port Vale (H) | 1–3 | Cameron | 7,000 |
| 19 April 1924 | Port Vale (A) | 0–0 | | 8,000 |
| 21 April 1924 | Leicester City (H) | 1–1 | Eddleston | 10,000 |
| 22 April 1924 | Leicester City (A) | 1–3 | McCulloch | 14,000 |
| 26 April 1924 | Leeds United (A) | 0–1 | | 20,000 |
| 3 May 1924 | Leeds United (H) | 3–1 | Eddleston (2), Chadwick | 10,000 |

=== Final league position ===
| Pos | Team | Pld | W | D | L | GF | GA | GAv | Pts | Promotion or relegation |
|---|---|---|---|---|---|---|---|---|---|---|
| 18 | Bradford City | 42 | 11 | 15 | 16 | 35 | 48 | 0.729 | 37 | |
| 19 | Coventry City | 42 | 11 | 13 | 18 | 52 | 68 | 0.765 | 35 | |
| 20 | Fulham | 42 | 10 | 14 | 18 | 45 | 56 | 0.804 | 34 | |
| 21 | Nelson (R) | 42 | 10 | 13 | 19 | 40 | 74 | 0.541 | 33 | Relegation to the Third Division North |
| 22 | Bristol City (R) | 42 | 7 | 15 | 20 | 32 | 65 | 0.492 | 29 | Relegation to the Third Division South |

(R) Relegated

== FA Cup ==
Match results

| Round | Date | Opponents | Result | Goalscorers | Attendance |
|---|---|---|---|---|---|
| Q5 | 1 December 1923 | Wigan Borough (A) | 1–1 | Ward (o.g.) | 12,650 |
| Q5r | 5 December 1923 | Wigan Borough (H) | 0–1 | | 4,000 |

== Appearances and goals ==
Key to positions

- CF = Centre forward
- DF = Defender
- FB = Fullback
- GK = Goalkeeper
- IF = Inside forward
- OF = Outside forward

Statistics

| Nat. | Position | Player | Third Division North | | FA Cup | | Total |
| Nat. | Position | Player | Apps | Goals | Apps | Goals | Apps | Goals |
|---|---|---|---|---|---|---|---|---|
| (England) | GK | Harry Abbott | 34 | 0 | 2 | 0 | 36 | 0 |
| (England) | GK | Joseph Birds | 4 | 0 | 0 | 0 | 4 | 0 |
| (Scotland) | OF | John Black | 6 | 0 | 0 | 0 | 6 | 0 |
| (England) | DF | Ernie Braidwood | 31 | 1 | 2 | 0 | 33 | 1 |
| (England) | DF | Jimmy Broadhead | 21 | 0 | 0 | 0 | 21 | 0 |
| (Scotland) | OF | Eddie Cameron | 8 | 3 | 0 | 0 | 8 | 3 |
| (England) | IF | Billy Caulfield | 18 | 5 | 0 | 0 | 18 | 5 |
| (England) | IF | Edgar Chadwick | 3 | 1 | 0 | 0 | 3 | 1 |
| (England) | DF | Leigh Collins | 13 | 0 | 2 | 0 | 15 | 0 |
| (England) | IF | Dick Crawshaw | 19 | 5 | 2 | 0 | 21 | 5 |
| (England) | CF | Joe Eddleston | 40 | 14 | 2 | 0 | 42 | 14 |
| (England) | OF | Ernest Gillibrand | 2 | 0 | 0 | 0 | 2 | 0 |
| (Scotland) | IF | Harry Higginbotham | 4 | 0 | 0 | 0 | 4 | 0 |
| (England) | OF | Sid Hoad | 26 | 3 | 2 | 0 | 28 | 3 |
| (England) | OF | Duggie Humphrey | 8 | 0 | 0 | 0 | 8 | 0 |
| (England) | OF | Bob Hutchinson | 22 | 0 | 2 | 0 | 24 | 0 |
| (England) | CF | Sam Kennedy | 6 | 0 | 0 | 0 | 6 | 0 |
| (England) | FB | William Lammus | 8 | 0 | 0 | 0 | 8 | 0 |
| (England) | FB | Bob Lilley | 5 | 0 | 0 | 0 | 5 | 0 |
| (England) | FB | Tom Lilley | 14 | 0 | 0 | 0 | 14 | 0 |
| (Scotland) | IF | Mike McCulloch | 21 | 2 | 0 | 0 | 21 | 2 |
| (Wales) | DF | Jack Newnes | 37 | 3 | 2 | 0 | 39 | 3 |
| (England) | GK | Harry Nutter | 2 | 0 | 0 | 0 | 2 | 0 |
| (England) | FB | Clement Rigg | 37 | 0 | 2 | 0 | 39 | 0 |
| (Scotland) | IF | Teddy Roseboom | 12 | 1 | 0 | 0 | 12 | 1 |
| (Scotland) | FB | John Steel | 1 | 0 | 0 | 0 | 1 | 0 |
| (Scotland) | GK | Jim Thomson | 2 | 0 | 0 | 0 | 2 | 0 |
| (England) | IF | Ted Ward | 2 | 0 | 0 | 0 | 2 | 0 |
| (Scotland) | DF | David Wilson | 31 | 0 | 2 | 0 | 33 | 0 |
| (England) | IF | Arthur Wolstenholme | 25 | 2 | 0 | 0 | 25 | 2 |

== See also ==
- List of Nelson F.C. seasons
