= 1925–26 Nelson F.C. season =

Nelson F.C.
1925–26 season
- Manager: Percy Smith
- Football League Third Division North: 8th
- FA Cup: First Round
- Top goalscorer: League: Joe Eddleston (20); All: Joe Eddleston (20)
- Highest home attendance: 14,143 (vs Bradford Park Avenue, 10 April 1926)
- Lowest home attendance: 3,989 (vs Chesterfield, 20 April 1926)
- Average home league attendance: 6,487
Home colours

The 1925–26 season was the 45th season in the history of Nelson F.C. and their fifth as a professional club in the Football League. The team competed in the Third Division North for the second consecutive season, having finished as runners-up to Darlington in the previous campaign. Nelson had a new manager in Percy Smith, following the departure of David Wilson in the summer of 1925. The team played well for the majority of the season, and achieved several good victories, including 7–0 wins against Tranmere Rovers and Wigan Borough. Nelson ended the season on 43 points, with a record of 16 wins, 11 draws and 15 defeats in their 42 matches.

Nelson entered the FA Cup in the First Round, but were knocked out at that stage by Wigan Borough. In their 43 competitive matches, Nelson used a total of 25 different players. The majority of the championship-winning team remained with Nelson. New signings included centre forward Jimmy Hampson, who went on to become an England international, centre-half George Wilson and outside forward Edwin Earle. With 20 goals in 32 appearances, Joe Eddleston was the team's top goalscorer for the fifth season in succession. Wilson was the only player to appear in every match during the campaign, scoring five goals in 43 games.

The highest attendance of the season at the club's Seedhill stadium was 14,143 against Bradford Park Avenue on 10 April 1926. Nelson's smallest crowd of the season was 3,989 in the penultimate home match of the campaign on 20 April 1926 against Chesterfield.

== Football League Third Division North ==
=== Key ===
- H = Home match
- A = Away match
- In Result column, Nelson's score shown first
- Goalscorers shown in order of first goal scored

=== Match results ===
Date	Opponents	Result	Goalscorers	Attendance
29 August 1925	Crewe Alexandra (H)	2–1	Eddleston, Bottrill	10,112
31 August 1925	Ashington (A)	1–5	Stevenson	3,902
5 September 1925	Lincoln City (A)	0–1		7,774
8 September 1925	Barrow (H)	3–3	Laycock, Hoad, Eddleston	6,522
12 September 1925	Southport (H)	3–3	Stevenson, Wilson, Hampson	6,718
15 September 1925	Ashington (H)	2–2	Eddleston, Hampson	7,461
19 September 1925	Doncaster Rovers (A)	1–1	Bottrill	3,088
26 September 1925	Wrexham (H)	5–1	Laycock, Bottrill, Chadwick (2), Eddleston	6,669
28 September 1925	Barrow (A)	0–1		1,601
3 October 1925	Coventry City (A)	0–1		11,766
10 October 1925	Accrington Stanley (H)	1–0	Chadwick	9,119
17 October 1925	Durham City (A)	2–0	Eddleston, Chadwick	3,538
24 October 1925	Hartlepools United (H)	5–2	Wilson, Chadwick (3), Eddleston	4,892
31 October 1925	Rotherham United (A)	3–1	Bottrill, Eddleston (2)	7,360
7 November 1925	Halifax Town (H)	1–1	Wilson	4,538
14 November 1925	Walsall (A)	2–0	Chadwick, Eddleston	2,586
5 December 1925	Grimsby Town (H)	1–1	Cowen	5,675
12 December 1925	Halifax Town (A)	1–1	Bottrill	7,204
19 December 1925	Tranmere Rovers (H)	7–0	Hampson (3), Earle, Hoad (2), Stevenson	4,354
25 December 1925	Wigan Borough (H)	7–0	Bottrill, Hampson (3), Earle (2), Stevenson	7,658
26 December 1925	New Brighton (A)	0–0		6,973
2 January 1926	Crewe Alexandra (A)	4–1	Hampson (3), Earle	6,387
9 January 1926	Bradford Park Avenue (A)	0–3		20,946
16 January 1926	Lincoln City (H)	5–2	Bottrill (2), Cowen (2), Newnes	5,586
23 January 1926	Southport (A)	1–2	Cowen	4,214
30 January 1926	Doncaster Rovers (H)	5–3	Eddleston (3), Bottrill (2)	6,402
6 February 1926	Wrexham (A)	2–3	Eddleston, Bottrill	4,792
13 February 1926	Coventry City (H)	4–1	Eddleston, Stevenson, Hoad, Earle	6,250
20 February 1926	Accrington Stanley (A)	2–3	Bottrill, Eddleston	7,153
27 February 1926	Durham City (H)	4–0	Earle, Bottrill (2), Wilson	4,819
6 March 1926	Hartlepools United (A)	0–2		4,397
13 March 1926	Rotherham United (H)	3–0	Bottrill (2), Stevenson	4,451
20 March 1926	Rochdale (A)	0–2		2,981
27 March 1926	Walsall (H)	2–0	Eddleston (2)	4,786
3 April 1926	Chesterfield (A)	1–3	Eddleston	8,743
5 April 1926	New Brighton (H)	1–1	Wilson	5,858
6 April 1926	Wigan Borough (A)	0–5		4,198
10 April 1926	Bradford Park Avenue (H)	2–2	Earle, Laycock	14,143
17 April 1926	Grimsby Town (A)	0–3		9,641
20 April 1926	Chesterfield (H)	3–3	Laycock (2), Hampson	3,989
24 April 1926	Rochdale (H)	1–3	Eddleston	6,215
1 May 1926	Tranmere Rovers (A)	2–4	Hampson, Eddleston	2,884

=== League table ===
Pos	Team	Pld	W	D	L	GF	GA	GAv	Pts
6	Hartlepools United	42	18	8	16	82	73	1.123	44
7	Tranmere Rovers	42	19	6	17	73	83	0.880	44
8	Nelson	42	16	11	15	89	71	1.254	43
9	Ashington	42	16	11	15	70	62	1.129	43
10	Doncaster Rovers	42	16	11	15	80	72	1.111	43

== FA Cup ==
Nelson entered the FA Cup at the First Round stage, the first time in their history they had played in the competition proper, having previously never progressed past the qualifying rounds. Nelson were drawn against fellow Third Division North outfit Wigan Borough, who they had faced in the Fifth Qualifying Round in the 1923–24 season. Then, Nelson had been beaten by one goal in a replay at Seedhill, following a 1–1 draw in the away tie. The team went into the cup match on 2 December 1925 having won five of their previous six league fixtures, and were unbeaten since the 0–1 loss to Coventry City on 3 October 1925. Nelson fielded the same starting line-up that had won the last match against Walsall, but were beaten 0–3 before a crowd of 3,836 spectators.

=== Key ===
- A = Away match
- R1 = First Round
- In Result column, Nelson's score shown first
- Goalscorers shown in order of first goal scored

=== Match result ===
Round	Date	Opponents	Result	Goalscorers	Attendance
R1	2 December 1925	Wigan Borough (A)	0–3		3,836

== Player statistics ==
Key to positions

- CF = Centre forward
- FB = Fullback
- GK = Goalkeeper
- HB = Half-back
- IF = Inside forward
- OF = Outside forward

Statistics

Nat.	Position	Player	Third Division North		FA Cup		Total
Nat.	Position	Player	Apps	Goals	Apps	Goals	Apps	Goals
(England)	GK	Harry Abbott	41	0	1	0	42	0
(England)	HB	Frank Bailey	1	0	0	0	1	0
(England)	IF	Billy Bottrill	38	16	1	0	39	16
(England)	DF	Ernie Braidwood	17	0	1	0	18	0
(England)	DF	Jimmy Broadhead	6	0	0	0	6	0
(England)	FB	Fred Broadhurst	37	0	1	0	38	0
(England)	HB	Herbert Butterworth	2	0	0	0	2	0
(England)	IF	Edgar Chadwick	13	8	1	0	14	8
(England)	FB	Walter Chadwick	2	0	0	0	2	0
(England)	HB	Harry Clayton	4	0	0	0	4	0
(England)	CF	Jimmy Cowen	3	4	0	0	3	4
(England)	OF	Wilf Denwood	3	0	0	0	3	0
(England)	OF	Edwin Earle	37	7	1	0	38	7
(England)	CF	Joe Eddleston	31	20	1	0	32	20
(England)	CF	Jimmy Hampson	20	13	0	0	20	13
(England)	HB	Ambrose Harris	22	0	0	0	22	0
(England)	OF	Sid Hoad	28	4	1	0	29	4
(England)	IF	Fred Laycock	11	5	0	0	11	5
(England)	GK	Fred Mace	1	0	0	0	1	0
(Wales)	HB	Jack Newnes	36	1	1	0	37	1
(Scotland)	FB	James Pearson	8	0	0	0	8	0
(England)	FB	Clement Rigg	33	0	1	0	34	0
(England)	IF	Fred Smith	1	0	0	0	1	0
(Scotland)	IF	John Stevenson	25	6	0	0	25	6
(England)	HB	George Wilson	42	5	1	0	43	5
