= Jimmy Broadhead =

English footballer (1894–1955)

Personal information
- Full name: James Edward Broadhead
- Date of birth: 25 August 1894
- Place of birth: Rotherham, England
- Date of death: 4 May 1955 (aged 60)
- Place of death: Whiston, England
- Height: 5 ft 10 in (1.78 m)
- Position: Defender

Senior career*
| Years | Team | Apps | (Gls) |
| 1913–1919 | Rotherham County | | |
| 1919–1920 | Norwich City | 31 | (8) |
| 1920–1921 | South Shields | 0 | (0) |
| 1921–1922 | Scunthorpe & Lindsey United | | |
| 1922–1926 | Nelson | 66 | (1) |
| 1926–1927 | Barnoldswick Town | | |
| 1927–1928 | Nelson | 1 | (0) |
| 1928–1930 | Horwich RMI | ? | (?) |
| 1930–1931 | Morecambe | ? | (?) |
- * Club domestic league appearances and goals

James Edward Broadhead (25 August 1894 – 4 May 1955) was an English professional footballer who played as a defender. Born in Rotherham, he started his career with Rotherham County in 1913, and then joined Norwich City in 1919. He later had spells with South Shields and Scunthorpe & Lindsey United before moving to Nelson, where he made 67 Football League appearances in two spells with the club. He played in non-League football towards the end of his career, before retiring to become a coach in the early 1930s.

== Biography ==
James Broadhead was born in Rotherham, West Riding of Yorkshire, on 25 August. After his football career ended, he settled in Whiston, Merseyside, and worked for retail and gambling company Littlewoods of Liverpool. He died in Whiston on 4 May 1955, at the age of 60.

== Football career ==
Broadhead started his senior career with his hometown club Rotherham County in 1913, having previously played junior football with Kimberworth Old Boys. His early career was interrupted by the First World War. After the conclusion of the war, Broadhead joined Southern Football League side Norwich City, where he scored eight goals in 31 matches during a solitary season at Carrow Road. In May 1920, he signed for Football League Second Division club South Shields. However, he failed to break into the first team and left in January 1921 without playing a single match for the club. He next joined Scunthorpe & Lindsey United and played one-and-a-half seasons with them, scoring the club's last ever goal in the Midland Football League, in a 1–1 draw with Harrogate Town.

In May 1922, Broadhead was recommended to Nelson player-manager David Wilson by former Chelsea forward Bob Whittingham, and became one of 11 new signings for Nelson at the start of the 1922–23 season. He made his Nelson debut on 26 August 1922 in the 2–6 defeat away at Bradford Park Avenue. On 14 April 1923, he scored his first goal for the club, netting the winner in the 2–1 win against Accrington Stanley at Seedhill. Broadhead missed only two matches during the campaign as the team won the Football League Third Division North to gain promotion to the Second Division for the first time in their history. He did not make the team as regularly in a higher league, and was often second choice left-half behind new signing Leigh Collins. Broadhead found his first-team opportunities highly limited during the 1924–25 season. On 21 April 1925, he played his first match in almost a year when he was selected for the 2–1 home win over Southport. He played in the first six games of the following campaign, but was then replaced by Ernie Braidwood and later by Ambrose Harris. After a four-year spell, in which he played total of 66 league matches and scored one goal for Nelson, Broadhead left Nelson in July 1926 to join non-league side Barnoldswick Town.

After one season with Barnoldswick, Broadhead returned to Nelson in a joint role as player and reserve team coach. After recovering from a knee injury, he played a number of matches for the second string as they were crowned champions of the Lancashire Combination for the 1927–28 season. Broadhead did make one appearance in the league for the first team, playing in the 2–3 loss to Bradford Park Avenue on 15 October 1927. In the summer of 1928, he transferred to Horwich RMI, before joining Morecambe in July 1930.

== After football ==
Following a short spell as a player with Morecambe, Broadhead retired from football to become a full-time coach. He returned to Nelson in the early 1930s as a trainer, before being appointed to the Southampton coaching staff in August 1935. After leaving Southampton, his final coaching job, Broadhead returned to the north of England.
