= Jack Lawton =

English footballer

Personal information
- Place of birth: England
- Position: Outside right

Senior career*
Years	Team	Apps	(Gls)
- Manchester North End
1935–1936	Burnley	3	(0)
- Altrincham
- * Club domestic league appearances and goals

Jack Lawton (fl. 1930s) was an English professional footballer who played as an outside right in the Football League for Burnley. He also played for Manchester North End and Altrincham.
