= Denwood =

Denwood is a surname. Notable people with the surname include:

- Philip Denwood (born 1941), British Tibetologist
- Wilf Denwood (1900–1959), British footballer

== See also ==
- Deanwood
- Denwood, Arkansas
- Denwood, Alberta
