= Laurence Lunn =

English footballer (1896–1946)

Personal information
- Full name: Laurence Lunn
- Date of birth: 1896
- Place of birth: Huddersfield, England
- Date of death: 1946 (aged 49–50)
- Height: 5 ft 9 in (1.75 m)
- Position: Goalkeeper

Senior career*
Years	Team	Apps	(Gls)
1921–1922	Oldham Athletic	0	(0)
1922–1923	Ashton National	?	(?)
1923–1924	Crewe Alexandra	12	(0)
1924–1925	Nelson	0	(0)
1925	Barrow	12	(0)
1925–1926	Llandudno	?	(?)
1926	Accrington Stanley	5	(0)
1926–1927	Crewe Alexandra	4	(0)
1927–1928	Mossley	31	(1)
- * Club domestic league appearances and goals

Laurence Lunn (1896 – 1946) was an English professional footballer who played as a goalkeeper. He played in the Football League Third Division North for Crewe Alexandra, Barrow and Accrington Stanley, making 33 appearances in total.

== Career ==
Born in Huddersfield, Lunn played for Royton Amateurs as a youth before having an unsuccessful trial period at Rochdale. He started his professional career at the age of 25 when he joined Football League First Division side Oldham Athletic in 1921. However, he failed to make a senior appearance during his sole season with the Boundary Park outfit and moved into Cheshire League football with Ashton National. After a second spell with Royton Amateurs, Lunn returned to the professional ranks, signing for Crewe Alexandra ahead of the 1923–24 campaign. He made his Football League debut in the 1–3 defeat to Durham City on 10 November 1923 and went on to make 13 appearances in all competitions during the campaign, although only one of those matches ended in victory, a 2–1 win away at Barrow on 19 January 1924. In the summer of that year, Lunn joined Nelson, who had just been relegated to the Third Division North from the Second Division. He remained with Nelson throughout the 1924–25 season but was unable to displace established first-choice goalkeeper Harry Abbott and did not play a single game for the club.

Lunn joined fellow Third Division North side Barrow in June 1925 and made 12 league appearances for the club during the first half of the 1925–26 campaign, including a 1–0 victory against his former employers Nelson. He then had a brief spell in Welsh football with Llandudno before returning to England with Accrington Stanley, where he played five league games. Lunn re-signed for Crewe Alexandra in the summer of 1926 and made a further four appearances for the club that season. 1926–27 season saw him join Mossley in the Cheshire County League and he made 41 appearances and even scored a goal from a penalty kick before retiring from football in 1927.
