= Joseph Baldwin (footballer) =

English footballer

Personal information
- Place of birth: Blackburn, England
- Position: Inside forward

Youth career
- Blackburn Rovers

Senior career*
Years	Team	Apps	(Gls)
1929	Nelson	1	(0)
- * Club domestic league appearances and goals

Joseph Baldwin was an English professional footballer who played as an inside forward. Born in Blackburn, Lancashire, he started his career as an amateur with his hometown club Blackburn Rovers. He was signed on professional terms in the summer of 1929 by Football League Third Division North outfit Nelson. Along with a host of other new signings, Baldwin made his league debut on 11 September 1930 in the 1–0 defeat to Darlington at Seedhill. However, he struggled in the match and did not appear again for the club, returning to the reserves at Blackburn Rovers later in the year.
