= Tom Pickering (footballer) =

English footballer

Personal information
- Full name: Thomas Pickering
- Date of birth: 1906
- Place of birth: Egremont, England
- Date of death: Unknown
- Position: Centre forward

Senior career*
Years	Team	Apps	(Gls)
19xx–1927	Egremont		
1927	Nelson	1	(0)
1927–19xx	Egremont		
- Parton Athletic
- * Club domestic league appearances and goals

Thomas Pickering (born 1906, date of death unknown) was an English professional footballer who played as a centre forward. Born in Egremont, Cumberland, he started his career playing local league football with his hometown club, before joining Football League Third Division North side Nelson as an amateur on 1 January 1927. He made his debut for the club on the same day, deputising for the injured regular centre forward Jimmy Hampson in the 3–0 win against Wrexham at Seedhill. Pickering was awarded a professional contract five days later, and remained at Nelson for a further two months but he did not make another senior appearance for the Lancashire club and returned to Egremont in March 1927. His stay was brief, however, as he transferred to nearby Parton Athletic in the summer of the same year.
