= Dennis Ridge =

English footballer (1904–1966)

Personal information
- Full name: Dennis Hazelwood Ridge
- Date of birth: 18 March 1904
- Place of birth: Wortley, England
- Date of death: 1966 (aged 62)
- Place of death: Leeds, England
- Position: Half back

Senior career*
Years	Team	Apps	(Gls)
19xx–1927	Ecclesfield United	?	(?)
1927	Halifax Town	0	(0)
1927–1928	Nelson	8	(0)
1928–1933	Scarborough	?	(?)
1933–1935	Scarborough Electric	?	(?)
- * Club domestic league appearances and goals

Dennis Hazelwood Ridge (18 March 1904 – 1966) was an English professional footballer who played as a half back. He was born in the village of Wortley, West Riding of Yorkshire, the son of a blacksmith.

Ridge began his football career in local league football with Ecclesfield United before joining Halifax Town on amateur terms in March 1927. Five months later, he signed for Football League Third Division North side Nelson as a professional. After playing the first part of the season in the reserve team, Ridge made his senior debut on 3 December 1927 in the 1–5 defeat to Ashington at Seedhill. He subsequently spent a month out of the team, before returning for the 6–3 win against Rochdale on 7 January 1928. Although he retained his place in the side for the following game, Ridge was then dropped after a 1–5 loss to his former club Halifax.

Ridge appeared in five consecutive matches towards the end of the 1927–28 campaign, four of which ended in defeats, as Nelson finished bottom of the Third Division North after conceding a record 136 goals. The club retained only nine players for the following season, and Ridge was one of those released from their contracts. He subsequently joined Midland Football League outfit Scarborough in July 1928. In the 1929–30 season, Ridge was a part of the team which won the Midland League championship, winning 36 of their 50 matches. After leaving Scarborough he played amateur football for Scarborough Electric between 1933 and 1935.
