= Thomas Garnett (footballer) =

English footballer

Personal information
- Full name: T
- Date of birth: 1900
- Place of birth: Burnley, England
- Date of death: 10 January 1950 (aged 49)
- Place of death: Burnley, England
- Position: Winger

Senior career*
Years	Team	Apps	(Gls)
1921–1922	Nelson	1	(0)
- * Club domestic league appearances and goals

Thomas Garnett (1900 – 10 January 1950) was an English professional footballer who played as a winger. He played in the Football League Third Division North for Nelson in the 1921–22 season. His single league appearance for the club came on 14 January 1922 in the 0–2 loss to Ashington at Seedhill.
