= Herbert Butterworth =

English footballer

Personal information
- Full name: Herbert Butterworth
- Date of birth: September quarter 1902
- Place of birth: Higham, England
- Date of death: March quarter 1938 (aged 35)
- Place of death: Derby, England
- Height: 5 ft 10 in (1.78 m)
- Position: Left half

Senior career*
Years	Team	Apps	(Gls)
1920–1921	Wolverhampton Wanderers	0	(0)
1921–1923	Higham	?	(?)
1923–1926	Nelson	9	(0)
1926	Colne Town	?	(?)
1926–1927	Great Harwood	?	(?)
1927–1928	Wellington Town	?	(?)
1928–1929	Colne Town	?	(?)
- * Club domestic league appearances and goals

Herbert Butterworth (September quarter 1902 – March quarter 1938) was an English professional footballer who played as a left half. He played nine matches in the Football League for Nelson and also assisted several non-league clubs. In 1929, he emigrated to Canada, but returned to England several years later.

== Biography ==
Herbert Butterworth was born in 1902 in the village of Higham, Lancashire. During his early career as a footballer, he also worked as a weaver in various local factories. On 8 March 1929, he emigrated to Halifax, Nova Scotia on the liner Regina and later worked in Calgary for the Canadian Pacific Railway. Some time later, he returned to England and worked at the Trent Motors factory in Derby. Butterworth lived in Derby until his death in the early months of 1938, at the age of 35.

== Career ==
=== Early career and Nelson ===
Butterworth started his career at Wolverhampton Wanderers but failed to break into the first team and joined his local club Higham in the Padiham & District Football League. In the 1922–23 season, he assisted the team to the league championship and in August 1923 he signed an amateur deal with local Football League Third Division North side Nelson. Butterworth initially played exclusively in the reserve team, but in January 1925 he signed a professional contract with the club. He subsequently made his league debut on 7 February 1925 in the 4–1 win against Tranmere Rovers at Seedhill. He kept his place in the team, playing in five consecutive league victories culminating in the 5–0 win over New Brighton on 7 March 1925, during which he was described by a local newspaper as "the best half-back on the field". His last appearance of the 1924–25 campaign came in the 1–2 defeat away at Lincoln City, after which he was replaced at left-half by new signing Ambrose Harris.

Butterworth returned to reserve team action for the start of the 1925–26 season, and helped the second string to the championship of the Lancashire Combination league and to the final of the Combination Cup. He made two first-team appearances for Nelson during the campaign, firstly deputising for Ernie Braidwood for the 4–1 victory over Coventry City on 13 February 1926. Butterworth played his last competitive match for the club in the 1–1 draw with New Brighton on 5 April 1926, filling in for the unavailable Harris. He left Nelson in the summer of 1926, having made a total of nine Football League appearances.

=== Non-league career ===
After being released by Nelson, Butterworth signed for Lancashire Combination side Colne Town in August 1926. He joined Great Harwood on a free transfer in December of the same year but could not prevent the team finishing bottom of the league for the second consecutive season. A move to Wellington Town of the Birmingham & District League followed in August 1927, and the club finished as runners-up in the division at the end of the 1927–28 campaign. Butterworth returned to Colne Town for the 1928–29 season and remained there until his emigration in March 1929. While working for the Canadian Pacific Railway and the Trent Motors factory, he also played amateur football for the works teams.
