= Harry Nutter =

English footballer

Personal information
- Full name: Henry Nutter
- Date of birth: c. 1901
- Place of birth: Nelson, England
- Date of death: c. 1983 (aged 81–82)
- Place of death: Victoria, Australia
- Height: 5 ft 10 in (1.78 m)
- Position: Goalkeeper

Senior career*
Years	Team	Apps	(Gls)
19xx–1924	Barnoldswick Town	?	(?)
1924	Nelson	2	(0)
- * Club domestic league appearances and goals

Harry Nutter (c. 1901 – c. 1983) was an English footballer who played as a goalkeeper (association football). He was born and raised in Nelson, Lancashire and made two appearances in The Football League for his hometown club in the 1923–24 season. Aside from football, he was also a keen athlete, and worked in several cotton mills in east Lancashire.

Nutter played amateur football for Barnoldswick Town before joining Nelson in February 1924. He was originally planned only to have a trial for the reserve team at Nelson, but because regular goalkeeper Harry Abbott was injured, Nutter was selected for the Football League Second Division match away at South Shields on 9 February 1924. Nelson lost 0–3, the final goal scored from a penalty kick after a foul by Nutter. He made his second appearance for the club the following week, but Nelson lost again as Bury won 5–0.

Nutter was subsequently released from Nelson and gave up professional football. He joined Lancashire Constabulary, with whom he spent a year as a constable. On 5 November 1926 he emigrated to Australia aboard the ocean liner Demosthenes. He later lived in Kew, Victoria. It is believed that Nutter died in Victoria in 1983.
