= James Phizacklea =

English footballer

Personal information
- Full name: James Robert Phizacklea
- Date of birth: 29 September 1898
- Place of birth: Barrow-in-Furness, England
- Date of death: 28 May 1971 (aged 72)
- Place of death: Ardleigh, England
- Height: 5 ft 10 1/2 in (1.79 m)
- Position: Left back

Senior career*
Years	Team	Apps	(Gls)
1921–1924	Barrow	71	(3)
1924–1925	Nelson	19	(0)
1925–1926	Preston North End	22	(0)
1926–1928	South Shields	68	(0)
1928–1930	Thames Association	?	(?)
1930–1931	Stockport County	0	(0)
1931	Guildford City	?	(?)
- * Club domestic league appearances and goals

James Robert Phizacklea (29 September 1898 – 28 May 1971) was an English professional footballer who played as a left back. Hailing from Barrow-in-Furness, he began his senior career in the Football League Third Division North with hometown club Barrow in June 1921. Phizacklea scored three goals in 71 League appearances for the Holker Street club before moving to fellow Third Division North outfit Nelson on a free transfer in the summer of 1924. He made his Nelson debut in the first match of the 1924–25 season, a 0–1 defeat away at Southport, and went on to play 21 competitive matches for the club. In January 1925, Phizacklea joined Football League First Division side Preston North End for a fee of £1,000.

After making 22 appearances for Preston, Phizacklea moved to South Shields, where he played 68 League games during two years with the club. Between 1928 and 1930 he played in the Southern Football League with Thames Association. He returned north in August 1930 to sign for Stockport County, but failed to make a first-team appearance for the side and subsequently had spells with Guildford City and as an amateur player with Roneo Sports in Romford. Phizacklea died in the village of Ardleigh, Essex, in 1971 at the age of 72.
