= Jack Newnes =

Welsh footballer

Personal information
- Date of birth: 6 June 1895
- Place of birth: Trefnant, Wales
- Date of death: 3 February 1969 (aged 73)
- Place of death: Salford, England
- Position: Half back

Senior career*
Years	Team	Apps	(Gls)
1919–1922	Brymbo Institute	?	(?)
1922–1923	Bolton Wanderers	7	(0)
1923–1926	Nelson	113	(7)
1926–1928	Southport	38	(2)
1928–1930	Mossley	67	(7)
1930–1931	Manchester North End	?	(?)
1931–1932	Winsford United	?	(?)
1932–1933	Glossop	?	(?)
1933–1935	Altrincham	6	(0)
1935–1936	Manchester North End	?	(?)

International career
1926	Wales	1	(0)
- * Club domestic league appearances and goals

Jack Newnes (6 June 1895 – 3 February 1969) was a Welsh professional footballer who played as a half-back. He played amateur football while working as a collier and a steel worker prior to entering professional football with Bolton Wanderers in 1922. He went on to play almost 150 matches in the Football League for Bolton, Nelson and Southport, before moving into non-league football in 1928. Newnes spent several years in the non-league game and represented a number of clubs around Manchester. He won one cap for the Wales national football team in 1926.

== Biography ==
John Newnes was born on 6 June 1895 in the village of Trefnant, near St Asaph, Denbighshire. Before becoming a professional footballer, he worked in the steel industry and as a coal miner. During the First World War, Newnes served in the British Army with the Royal Welch Fusiliers. Following his retirement from football, he resided in the Manchester area and was employed as a salesman in a fruit and vegetable market. Newnes died in Salford, Greater Manchester, on 3 February 1969, at the age of 73.

== Club career ==
Newnes played amateur football for Whitchurch as a youth, and represented Brymbo Institute between 1919 and 1922. He was 26 years old when he entered the professional game with Football League First Division side Bolton Wanderers in May 1922. Newnes was initially restricted to reserve team matches, and made his League debut for the club in the 4–2 win against Nottingham Forest on 2 January 1923. He went on to make seven first-team appearances for Bolton during the remainder of the 1922–23 season.

In September 1923, Newnes moved to newly promoted Football League Second Division club Nelson for an undisclosed transfer fee, although it was announced that it was the largest fee ever paid by the club at the time. He played his first game for Nelson in the 0–0 draw with Southampton at Seedhill on 11 September 1923. A noted taker of penalty kicks, Newnes scored his first goal for the Blues from the penalty mark in the 2–0 defeat of Stoke later the same month. Generally a right-half or centre-half, Newnes featured as an inside forward for a three-match spell in April 1924. He played a total of 39 competitive matches for Nelson during the 1923–24 season, but despite scoring three goals (two of them penalties) he could not prevent the team being relegated to the Third Division North.

Newnes retained his place in the starting line-up at the outset of the 1924–25 campaign and scored in the first home match of the new season, a 4–0 win over Ashington. Three games later, he netted a penalty in the 7–1 defeat of Durham City. Newnes played in all but two first-team matches during the season, including the 2–0 win against Hartlepools United on 21 March 1925, in which he played at right-back in the absence of William Harper. Nelson finished second in the division behind Darlington, thus narrowly missing out on an immediate return to the second tier. Newnes remained at the club for one more season, and by the time he left Nelson in October 1926 he had made 113 league appearances and scored 7 goals.

Upon leaving Nelson, Newnes joined fellow Third Division North outfit Southport and spent almost two seasons with the Sandgrounders, playing 38 league matches for the club. Newnes moved into non-League football when he signed for Cheshire League side Mossley in July 1928. He scored 7 goals in 67 league games for Mossley before departing in February 1930. He subsequently spent a year with Manchester North End, followed by spells with Winsford United and Glossop. Newnes joined Altrincham in 1933 and stayed with the club for two seasons before returning to Manchester North End as a player-coach in September 1935. At the age of 40, he retired from football in 1936.

== International football ==
Newnes' performances for Nelson in the 1925–26 season earned him a call-up to the Wales national football team for the match against Ireland on 13 February 1926. He made his international debut in the match, but could not prevent the team falling to a 0–3 defeat and was never selected for his country again. In representing Wales, Newnes became the only player ever to be capped at senior international level while at Nelson.
