= Joseph O'Beirne =

Irish footballer

Personal information
- Full name: Patrick Joseph O'Beirne
- Date of birth: 15 June 1900
- Place of birth: Waterford, Ireland
- Date of death: 1980 (aged 80)
- Place of death: Manchester, England
- Height: 5 ft 9 in (1.75 m)
- Position: Inside forward

Senior career*
Years	Team	Apps	(Gls)
1921–1923	Stalybridge Celtic	10	(6)
1923–1925	Burnley	17	(6)
1924–1926	Nelson	16	(2)
1925–1926	→ Middlewich (loan)	4	(1)
1928–1930	Congleton Town	15	(5)
1930–1931	Manchester Central	8	(6)
1931–1932	Stalybridge Celtic	11	(4)
- * Club domestic league appearances and goals

Patrick Joseph O'Beirne (15 June 1900 – 1980) was an Irish professional footballer who played as an inside forward. During a career spanning more than ten years, he played in the Football League for Stalybridge Celtic, Burnley and Nelson, in addition to spells with several non-league clubs. Outside of football, O'Beirne served with the British Army and worked in the printing industry.

== Biography ==
Joseph Patrick O'Beirne was born on 15 June 1900 in the town of Waterford in south-east Ireland. He moved to Manchester, England with his family when he was young and grew up in the city, continuing to live there for the rest of his life, where he married Edith, his wife. They had a daughter called Patricia Ann. In his late teens, O'Beirne served in the Welch Regiment of the British Army. After retiring from professional football, he was employed as a typesetter for the Daily Mail and was also an Air Raid Precautions warden during the Second World War. He died in Manchester in the summer of 1980, at the age of 80.

== Football career ==
O'Beirne played football for the Welch Regiment while in the Army, before joining local club Norman Athletic in 1920. A year later, he joined Football League Third Division North side Stalybridge Celtic on amateur terms, making one first-team appearance in the 1921–22 season. He was awarded a professional contract in March 1922 and played a further nine league matches in the following campaign. In August 1923, O'Beirne was signed on a free transfer by Football League First Division outfit Burnley. He made his debut for the club on 15 September 1923, replacing Albert Freeman, who had played in the previous two matches, in the goalless draw away at Nottingham Forest. He appeared in the next three league games, and scored his first competitive goal in the Lancashire Senior Cup tie against Manchester City on 15 October 1922. He then spent over four months out of the team, unable to oust regular inside-left Benny Cross. O'Beirne was reinstated to the starting line-up for the 2–2 draw with Manchester City on 16 February 1923, but subsequently returned to the reserves for the remainder of the season.

In the close season of 1924, O'Beirne moved to Third Division North club Nelson for a fee of £150. He played his first league game for the club on 30 August 1924, in the 0–1 loss to Southport. He was a regular in the starting line-up throughout the opening weeks of the campaign, and was one of five goalscorers in the 7–1 win against Durham City at Seedhill on 16 September 1924. O'Beirne netted the only goal of the game as Nelson defeated Lincoln City two weeks later. He scored the final goal in the 4–1 defeat of Winsford United in the Fifth Qualifying Round of the FA Cup on 29 November 1924. Towards the middle of the season, he played several matches in an unfamiliar outside-left position before being dropped from the side following the 1–1 draw with Ashington on 3 January 1925. O'Beirne was selected for the 0–2 loss away at Grimsby Town on 14 March 1925, which proved to be his final league appearance for Nelson. In December 1925, he was sent on loan to non-league side Middlewich until the end of the 1925–26 season. O'Beirne then spent two years out of football before joining Cheshire outfit Congleton Town in the summer of 1928. He signed for Manchester Central two seasons later, before re-joining Stalybridge Celtic in 1931. He retired from playing football in 1932 to work in the printing industry. He also worked as a scout for Manchester City, until the 1970s.
