= William Lammus =

English footballer

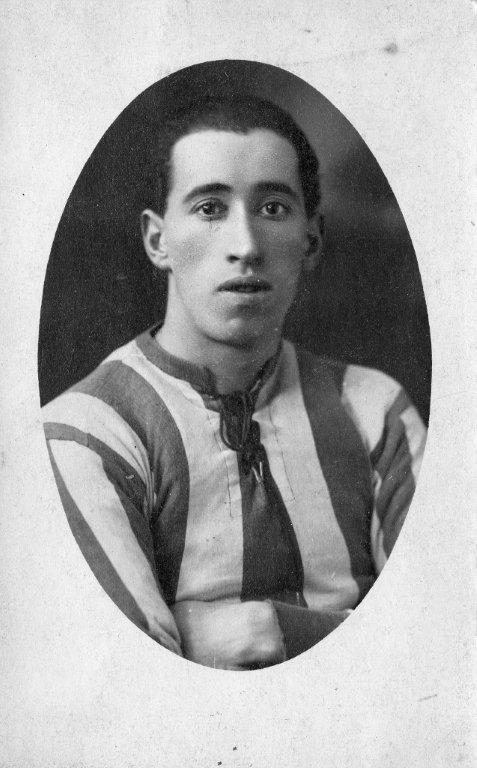

Personal information
- Full name: William Christmas James Lammus
- Date of birth: 14 August 1898
- Place of birth: East Ham, England
- Date of death: January quarter 1982 (aged 83)
- Place of death: Southend-on-Sea, England
- Height: 5 ft 11 in (1.80 m)
- Position: Right-back

Senior career*
Years	Team	Apps	(Gls)
19xx–1922	Barking Town	?	(?)
1922–1923	West Bromwich Albion	0	(0)
1923–1924	Nelson	8	(0)
1924–19??	Nuneaton Town	?	(?)
19??–1932	Tunbridge Wells Rangers	?	(?)
- * Club domestic league appearances and goals

William Christmas James Lammus (14 August 1898 – January quarter 1982) was an English professional footballer who played as a right-back. He was born in East Ham, Essex, and started his career with his hometown club Barking Town. In May 1922, Lammus signed for Football League First Division side West Bromwich Albion. However, he did not make a senior appearance for the club and joined newly promoted Second Division outfit Nelson in July 1923, as a replacement for Scottish right-back John Steel.

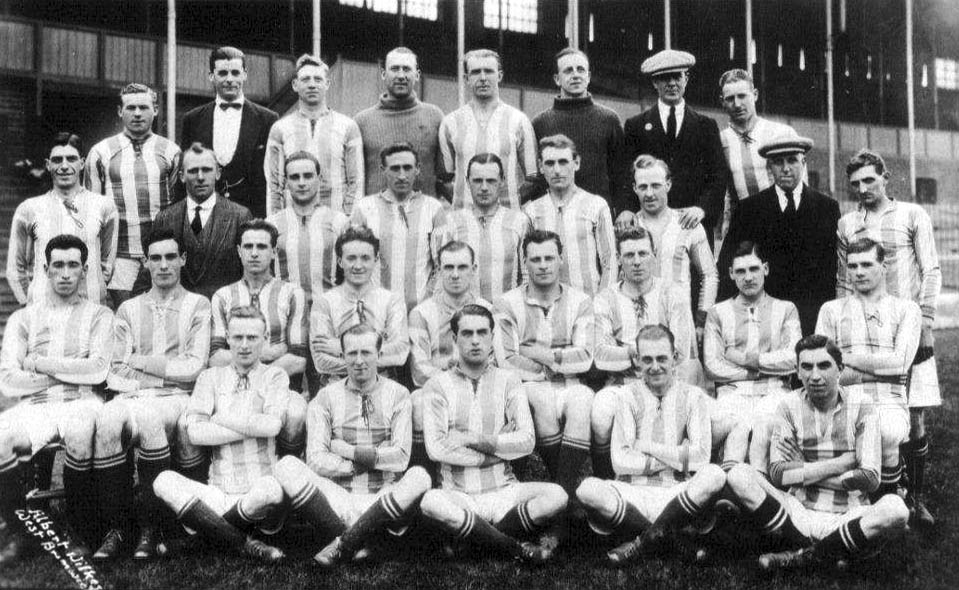
West Bromwich Albion 1922 - 1923

Lammus made his debut for Nelson on 27 August 1923 in the 0–1 defeat away at Stockport County. He kept his place in the team for eight matches before being dropped following the 2–0 win against Stoke on 29 September 1923. Player-manager David Wilson subsequently played himself in the right-back position for the several matches until the arrival of Tom Lilley from Huddersfield Town in November 1923.

Nelson were relegated to the Third Division North at the end of the 1923–24 season, and Lammus was one of several players released by the club. He then moved into non-League football with Nuneaton Town and later Tunbridge Wells Rangers. By August 1932, he was playing amateur football for the New Beckton Baptist Church in West Ham. Lammus died in Southend-on-Sea, Essex, in early 1982 at the age of 83.

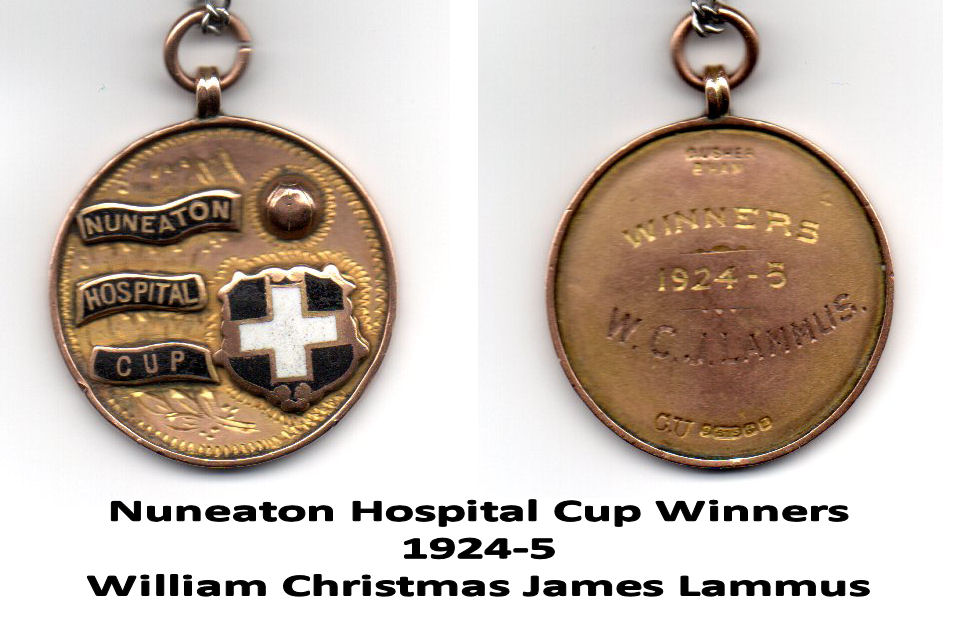
Nuneaton Hospital Cup
