= Walter Moore (footballer, born 1899) =

English footballer

Personal information
- Full name: Walter Moore
- Date of birth: 1899
- Place of birth: Darfield, England
- Date of death: 1972 (aged 72–73)
- Place of death: Staincross, England
- Positions: Outside forward; full back

Senior career*
Years	Team	Apps	(Gls)
- West Melton Athletic
19xx–1924	Darfield		
1924–1925	Nelson	5	(0)
1925–1927	Wath Athletic		
1932–19xx	Winterwell Athletic	?	
- * Club domestic league appearances and goals

Walter Moore (1899–1972) was an English professional footballer who played as an outside forward or as a right-back. He played five matches in the Football League Third Division North for Nelson in the 1924–25 season, making his debut in the 2–1 win against Halifax Town on 25 October 1924. For the majority of his career, however, Moore played in local league football for several clubs in the South Yorkshire area.
