= Frank Bailey (footballer, born 1907) =

English footballer

Personal information
- Date of birth: 2 August 1907
- Place of birth: Burnley, England
- Date of death: 1969 (aged 62)
- Place of death: Burnley, England
- Position: Wing half

Senior career*
Years	Team	Apps	(Gls)
1925–1928	Nelson	4	(0)
1929–1930	Great Harwood		
1930–1931	Lancaster Town		
1931–1934	Rossendale United	33	(7)
1934	Morecambe		
- * Club domestic league appearances and goals

Frank Bailey (2 August 1907 – 1969) was an English professional footballer who played as a wing-half. Between 1925 and 1928, he played four matches in the Football League for Nelson.
