= Billy Harper (footballer, born 1897) =

English footballer

Personal information
- Full name: William Harper
- Date of birth: 17 August 1897
- Place of birth: Blackburn, England
- Date of death: 20 January 1982 (aged 84)
- Place of death: Blackpool, England
- Height: 6 ft 0 in (1.83 m)
- Position: Right-back

Senior career*
Years	Team	Apps	(Gls)
19xx–1924	Feniscowles	?	(?)
1924–1925	Nelson	6	(0)
1925–1927	Darwen	?	(?)
1927–19xx	Chorley	?	(?)
- * Club domestic league appearances and goals

William Harper (17 August 1897 – 20 January 1982) was an English professional footballer who played as a right-back. Born in Blackburn, Lancashire, he started his career in local football with Feniscowles in the Blackburn Amateur League. While playing for Feniscowles, he was scouted by former Everton and Blackpool player William Williams, who recommended Harper to Third Division North side Nelson. He subsequently joined Nelson in August 1924, initially as an amateur player.

Harper was given a professional contract in December 1924, and went on to make his debut for Nelson on 18 March 1925 in the 1–2 defeat away at Lincoln City. He lost his place in the team following that match, but returned to the starting line-up later the same month in place of the unavailable Bob Lilley. Harper made a total of six league appearances for Nelson in the 1924–25 season. However, he was not retained at the end of the campaign and returned to non-League football with Lancashire Combination club Darwen. He later had a spell with Chorley. Harper died in Blackpool in 1982 at the age of 84.
