= Fred Laycock =

English footballer (1897-1989)

Personal information
- Full name: Frederick Walter Laycock
- Date of birth: 31 March 1897
- Place of birth: Sheffield, England
- Date of death: 19 September 1989 (aged 92)
- Place of death: Sheffield, England
- Height: 5 ft 9 in (1.75 m)
- Position: Inside forward

Senior career*
Years	Team	Apps	(Gls)
1921–1922	Shirebrook		
1922–1923	Rotherham Town		
1923–1924	Sheffield Wednesday	0	(0)
1924–1925	Barrow	31	(10)
1925–1926	Nelson	23	(12)
1926–1927	Mansfield Town		
1927–1928	New Brighton	28	(14)
1928–1929	Peterborough & Fletton United		
1929–1930	Darlington	35	(14)
1930–1931	York City	27	(12)
1931–1933	Swindon Town	16	(2)
1933–1934	Derry City		
1934–1935	Witton Albion		
1935–1936	Nuneaton Town		
1936–1937	Cannock Town		
1937	Hereford United		
- * Club domestic league appearances and goals

Frederick Walter Laycock (31 March 1897 – 19 September 1989) was an English professional footballer who played as an inside forward. He was born in Sheffield. He began his career in local football with St Mary's and Shirebrook. After a spell in the Midland League with Rotherham Town, Laycock signed as a professional with Sheffield Wednesday in March 1923. However, he failed to make a first-team appearance for the club and moved on a free transfer to Football League Third Division North side Barrow the following year. At Holker Street, Laycock scored 10 goals in 31 league matches. Said to be an outstanding header of the football, his form for Barrow attracted other clubs to his signature. At the match against Rotherham County on 16 March 1925, the final day for transfers in the 1924–25 season, several clubs sent representatives to sign the player. While the game was in progress, Laycock was called from the field of play to sign for Third Division North rivals Nelson, before completing the rest of the match for Barrow. Both Laycock and Nelson were later fined over the incident, Laycock receiving his punishment for illegally representing Barrow while contracted to a different club.

Laycock made his Nelson debut four days later in the 2–0 win against Hartlepools United at Seedhill. He scored his first goal for the club the following week in the 1–0 victory away at Rochdale, the team's third consecutive win. However, Nelson's form then faltered as they took just one point from the next three games. Laycock netted twice in the 7–0 defeat of Crewe Alexandra on 13 April 1925, the biggest winning margin Nelson ever achieved in the Football League. Later in the month, he scored four goals in two matches against Wrexham and Southport. Laycock continued his goalscoring form into the following season, but was then dropped to the reserve team. He scored 18 goals in the Lancashire Combination as the Nelson reserves won the league for the first time. Laycock returned to the first-team in April 1926 and scored three goals in the last five matches of the 1925–26 campaign, including two in the 3–3 draw with Chesterfield.

In the summer of 1926 Laycock moved into non-League football with Mansfield Town, where he spent one season before returning to the Third Division North with New Brighton. He had a record of a goal every other game for the Wallasey-based club, ending the 1927–28 season with 14 goals in 28 appearances. Laycock switched club again in September 1928, joining Southern Football League club Peterborough & Fletton United on a free transfer. Another move to Darlington in the summer of 1929 meant a third spell in the Football League for Laycock. His record of 14 goals in 35 matches helped Darlington to a third-placed finish in the league, but Laycock was released at the end of the season and signed for York City. During a single season with the Fulfordgate club, he netted 12 times in 27 League appearances.

Laycock moved to Third Division South outfit Swindon Town in May 1931, his 11th new club in as many years. He made his debut for them in the 3–2 defeat against his former club Mansfield Town on 29 August 1931, and scored his first goal for the side in the following fixture, a 4–1 victory over Watford at the County Ground. Despite playing regularly for the first three months of the season, he was used only sparingly in the latter stages of the campaign. Laycock scored his second and last Swindon goal on the final Football League appearance of his career, in the 4–0 win against Gillingham on 9 April 1932. After leaving Swindon in July 1933, he had a spell in Northern Ireland with Derry City before returning to the English non-League game with Witton Albion in October 1934. Laycock subsequently assisted several non-League sides, including Nuneaton Town and Cannock Town. He had trial periods with Northwich Victoria and Shrewsbury Town in 1936, and joined his final club, Hereford United, in January 1937. Laycock returned to Sheffield at the end of his playing career and died in the city on 19 September 1989, at the age of 92.
