= Bill Ellerington Sr. =

English footballer

Bill Ellerington
Personal information
- Full name: William Ellerington
- Date of birth: January quarter 1892
- Place of birth: Sunderland, England
- Date of death: October quarter 1948 (aged 56)
- Place of death: Southampton, England
- Height: 5 ft 11 in (1.80 m)
- Position: Centre-half

Senior career*
Years	Team	Apps	(Gls)
1912–1919	Darlington	?	(?)
1919–1924	Middlesbrough	127	(1)
1924–1925	Nelson	26	(2)
1925	Mid Rhondda	?	(?)
1925–1930	Ebbw Vale	?	(?)
1930–19xx	Basingstoke Town	?	(?)

Managerial career
- 1926–1930: Ebbw Vale (player-manager)
- * Club domestic league appearances and goals

William Ellerington (January quarter 1892 – October quarter 1948) was an English professional footballer who played as a centre-half. He played over 150 matches in the Football League for Middlesbrough and Nelson. His son, also called Bill, played for England and Southampton.
