= Ernest Gillibrand =

English footballer (1901-1976

Personal information
- Full name: Ernest Percival Gillibrand
- Date of birth: 27 August 1901
- Place of birth: Prestwich, England
- Date of death: October quarter 1976 (aged 75)
- Place of death: Macclesfield, England
- Height: 5 ft 5 in (1.65 m)
- Positions: Centre forward; outside forward

Senior career*
Years	Team	Apps	(Gls)
1920–1921	Northwich Victoria		
1921–1922	Glossop		
1922–1923	Aston Villa	0	(0)
1923–1924	Nelson	2	(0)
1924–1925	Rossendale United	38	(17)
1925–1926	Manchester North End		
1926	Stalybridge Celtic		
1926–1927	Buxton		
1927–1929	Denton United		
1929–1930	Hyde United	42	(86)
1930–1931	Denton United		
1931	Buxton		
1931–1935	Droylsden		
1935–1936	Ashton National	24	(15)
1936	Denton United		
1936–1937	Stalybridge Celtic		
- * Club domestic league appearances and goals

Ernest Percival Gillibrand (27 August 1901 – 1976) was an English footballer who played predominantly as a centre forward, but could also play at outside forward. He had a somewhat nomadic career, representing no fewer than 12 different clubs. During his career, Gillibrand played over 500 matches and scored in excess of 500 goals in the Manchester Football League. While playing for Hyde United, he set a league record of 87 goals in one season. He had a short spell as a professional player in the early stages of his career, and made two appearances in the Football League for Nelson.

== Football career ==
As a youth, Gillibrand played for Hugh Oldham Lads and Compstall. In the 1920–21 season, he joined Northwich Victoria of the Cheshire County League. He subsequently played for Glossop before signing for Football League side Aston Villa as an amateur in March 1922. Two months later, he was awarded a professional contract but he failed to break into the first-team and left the club at the end of the 1922–23 season. In August 1923, Gillibrand joined Third Division North outfit Nelson on a free transfer. After spending the first few months in the reserve team, he made his Nelson debut on 29 December 1923 in the 1–1 draw away at Blackpool. Gillibrand made his second and final Nelson appearance in the following match, also against Blackpool, on 5 January 1924.

After leaving Nelson, Gillibrand returned to non-League football with Rossendale United. He spent just over one season with Rossendale before joining Manchester North End in October 1925. Gillibrand went on to play for several other clubs in the Manchester Football League over the following seasons, including Stalybridge Celtic and Buxton. In 1929 he signed for Hyde United. During his single season with the club, Gillibrand scored a total of 86 goals, setting a new record haul for the Manchester League. He then had short spells with Denton United and Buxton prior to joining Droylsden in 1931. Gillibrand spent four seasons at the Butcher's Arms Ground, scoring a total of 275 goals in all competitions. In November 1934, he made his 500th appearance in the Manchester League, and scored his 500th league goal the following month in a match against his former club, Denton United. Gillibrand was awarded a testimonial match by Droylsden in March 1935, but left the club at the end of the 1934–35 campaign. He ended his career with spells at Ashton National and Stalybridge Celtic, where he was manager of the reserve team.
