= List of Nelson F.C. seasons =

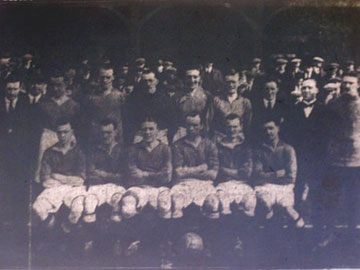
The Nelson team who won the Football League Third Division North in the 1922–23 season

Nelson Football Club is an English semi-professional association football club based in the town of Nelson, Lancashire. Founded in 1882, the club played friendly matches for its first eight years, before becoming one of the founder members of the Lancashire League in 1889. The team won the Lancashire League title in 1896, however, after enduring a month-long Football Association suspension, the club left the league during the 1898–99 season following the 3–2 home defeat by Ashton North End on January 12 and their record for that season was subsequently expunged when they were expelled by the Lancashire FA. Having completed the North-East Lancashire Combination League and Shield double in 1900, Nelson were accepted back into the Lancashire League the following season and in 1901, they joined the Lancashire Combination. Between 1915 and 1918, the team ceased play for the First World War. When competitive football restarted in England in 1919, they joined the Central League. Two seasons later, the club was invited to be one of the founder teams of the Football League Third Division North. They won the league in 1923, gaining promotion to the Football League Second Division. However, they stayed there for just one season, finishing second-bottom of the league and being relegated back to the Third Division.

After finishing bottom of the division for the second time, Nelson left the Football League in 1931 after failing re-election. They rejoined the Lancashire Combination, and played in the league for the next five seasons, before, following reformation in the summer of 1934, ceasing all football activities in August 1936. The club returned to action following the Second World War, and won the Lancashire Combination title in 1950 and 1952. Nelson continued to play in the same league until 1982, when the side achieved a third-placed finish. In the same year, the non-league football system was re-organised, resulting in the formation of the North West Counties Football League. The club was accepted into the league's Third Division, and was transferred to the Second Division in 1987, as a result of the abolition of the third tier. However, the following season the team was forced to leave the league after their ground was deemed to be unfit. They joined the West Lancashire League in 1988 and stayed there until 1992, never finishing higher than 15th in four seasons. That year, the club was accepted back into the North West Counties League Second Division after improving the stadium. The club played in the same division for the next 15 years, until they won promotion to the First Division, where they played until the end of the 2009–10 season. On 16 July 2010, it was announced that Nelson had resigned from the North West Counties Football League with immediate effect.

The side first played in the FA Cup in 1893 and have reached the Second Round three times, in 1926–27, 1930–31 and 1950–51. In the 1970s, the club entered the FA Trophy on a number of occasions, but never progressed past the Second Qualifying Round. Since the club's first entry into the FA Vase in 1978, the side have reached the Second Round twice, in the 2001–02 and 2005–06 seasons.

== Seasons ==
List of seasons, including league division and statistics, cup results and top scorer
Season	Division	P	W	D	L	F	A	Pts	Pos	FA Cup	FA Trophy^{[A]}	FA Vase^{[B]}
1882–89	Nelson played only friendly matches											
1889–90	LL	24	12	4	8	55	44	28	4th	—	—	—
1890–91	LL	20	10	4	6	68	54	24	4th	—	—	—
1891–92	LL	22	10	4	8	82	63	24	6th	—	—	—
1892–93	LL	22	4	2	16	54	73	10	11th	—	—	—
1893–94	LL	22	10	6	6	70	55	26	5th	Q1	—	—
1894–95	LL	26	14	5	7	75	48	33	3rd	Q2	—	—
1895–96	LL	30	22	4	4	105	39	48	1st	PR	—	—
1896–97	LL	28	13	5	10	66	38	31	6th	Q4	—	—
1897–98	LL	26	17	3	6	72	33	37	2nd	Q3	—	—
1898–99	LL	10	5	2	3	25	21	12	N/A	Q3^{[C]}	—	—
1899–1900	NELC	18	14	3	1	64	23	31	1st	Q1	-	
1900–01	LL	20	8	4	8	33	35	20	6th	Q3	—	—
1901–02	LC	34	13	7	14	60	64	33	9th	Q1	—	—
1902–03	LC	34	7	7	20	43	80	21	17th	Q3	—	—
1903–04	LC1	34	16	4	14	66	61	36	8th	Q2	—	—
1904–05	LC1	34	13	7	14	57	43	33	10th	Q5^{[V]}	—	—
1905–06	LC1	38	16	4	18	66	76	36	14th	PR	—	—
1906–07	LC1	38	10	5	23	53	113	25	18th‡	PR	—	—
1907–08	LC2	38	26	3	9	124	48	55	4th†	Q1	—	—
1908–09	LC1	38	15	9	14	62	63	39	8th	Q1	—	—
1909–10	LC1	38	14	10	14	61	59	38	8th	Q1	—	—
1910–11	LC1	38	15	8	15	64	63	38	8th	Q5	—	—
1911–12	LC1	32	9	7	16	58	66	25	14th	Q2	—	—
1912–13	LC1	34	19	4	11	82	59	42	3rd	Q4	—	—
1913–14	LC1	34	14	4	16	47	64	32	10th	Q3	—	—
1914–15	LC1	32	13	4	15	66	64	30	11th	Q1	—	—
1915–19	No competitive matches due to the First World War											
1919–20	CL	42	16	8	18	63	71	40	13th	Q1	—	—
1920–21	CL	42	14	9	19	71	70	37	17th	Q2	—	—
1921–22	FL3N	38	13	7	18	48	66	33	16th	Q6	—	—
1922–23	FL3N	38	24	3	11	61	41	51	1st†^{[D]}	Q5	—	—
1923–24	FL2	42	10	13	19	40	74	33	21st‡^{[E]}	Q5	—	—
1924–25	FL3N	42	23	7	12	79	50	53	2nd	Q6	—	—
1925–26	FL3N	42	16	11	15	89	71	43	8th	R1	—	—
1926–27	FL3N	42	22	7	13	104	75	51	5th	R2^{[F]}	—	—
1927–28	FL3N	42	10	6	26	76	136^{[L]}	26	22nd^{[G]}	R1	—	—
1928–29	FL3N	42	17	5	20	77	90	39	15th	—	—	—
1929–30	FL3N	42	13	7	22	51	80	33	19th	R1	—	—
1930–31	FL3N	42	6	7	29	43	113	19	22nd‡^{[H]}^{[K]}	R2	—	—
1931–32	LC	36	19	6	11	74	53	44	5th	Q4	—	—
1932–33	LC	38	14	8	16	83	81	36	11th	R1	—	—
1933–34	LC	38	16	8	14	97	86	40	8th	—	—	—
1934–35	LC	38	17	10	11	88	61	44	6th	Q1	—	—
1935–36	LC	40	16	9	15	86	84	41	10th	Q2	—	—
1936–46	Nelson inactive^{[I]}											
1946–47	LC	42	18	7	17	100	85	43	11th	PR	—	—
1947–48	LC1	42	24	9	9	84	62	57	2nd	Q4	—	—
1948–49	LC1	42	20	9	13	87	68	49	4th	Q1	—	—
1949–50	LC1	42	30	4	8	125	63	64	1st	Q2	—	—
1950–51	LC1	42	29	3	10	120	64	61	2nd	R2	—	—
1951–52	LC1	42	30	3	9	139^{[J]}	59	63	1st	R1	—	—
1952–53	LC1	42	20	8	14	86	72	48	5th	Q4	—	—
1953–54	LC1	40	21	6	13	91	68	48	3rd	R1	—	—
1954–55	LC1	42	14	8	20	82	84	36	16th	Q2	—	—
1955–56	LC1	38	12	8	18	60	89	32	15th	Q1	—	—
1956–57	LC1	38	15	5	18	53	59	35	13th	Q1	—	—
1957–58	LC1	42	17	6	19	65	71	40	11th	Q1	—	—
1958–59	LC1	42	19	9	14	82	74	47	9th	Q2	—	—
1959–60	LC1	42	22	4	16	78	68	48	7th	Q1	—	—
1960–61	LC1	42	29	7	6	106	47	65	2nd	Q4	—	—
1961–62	LC1	42	20	5	17	86	71	45	11th	Q2	—	—
1962–63	LC1	42	22	4	16	95	81	48	8th	Q1	—	—
1963–64	LC1	42	23	3	16	84	73	49	8th	Q2	—	—
1964–65	LC1	42	15	7	20	68	108	37	13th	Q3	—	—
1965–66	LC1	42	10	5	27	56	121	25	21st‡	Q1	—	—
1966–67	LC2	30	8	5	17	44	73	21	13th	Q2	—	—
1967–68	LC2	32	12	5	15	63	67	29	12th	Q1	—	—
1968–69	LC	42	12	8	22	66	110	32	18th	PR	—	—
1969–70	LC	38	8	5	25	60	106	25	16th	—	—	—
1970–71	LC	30	9	8	13	55	59	26	10th	—	—	—
1971–72	LC	28	13	5	10	69	49	31	7th	—	—	—
1972–73	LC	38	12	7	19	60	76	31	12th	—	Q1	—
1973–74	LC	38	6	6	26	36	111	18	20th	—	Q1	—
1974–75	LC	38	19	8	11	77	50	46	6th	—	PR	—
1975–76	LC	34	18	5	11	59	35	41	5th	—	Q2^{[M]}	—
1976–77	LC	34	15	3	16	48	46	33	8th	—	PR	—
1977–78	LC	34	4	5	25	33	94	13	18th	—	Q1	—
1978–79	LC	28	7	10	11	31	33	24	8th	—	—	R1
1979–80	LC	32	7	8	17	46	67	22	14th	—	—	PR
1980–81	LC	34	7	3	24	29	60	17	17th	—	—	—
1981–82	LC	34	19	7	8	66	44	45	3rd	—	—	—
1982–83	NWC3^{[N]}	34	7	16	11	49	56	30	10th	—	—	—
1983–84	NWC3	34	8	10	16	49	55	26	14th	—	—	PR
1984–85	NWC3	34	9	4	21	43	80	22	17th	—	—	PR
1985–86	NWC3	28	7	7	14	36	65	19*	14th	—	—	R1
1986–87	NWC3	24	12	6	6	37	29	30	4th	—	—	EP
1987–88	NWC2	42	12	10	20	49	76	34	16th	—	—	PR
1988–89	WLL2^{[O]}	34	7	5	22	59	104	26	16th	—	—	EP
1989–90	WLL2	34	7	4	23	58	102	23*	15th	—	—	EP
1990–91	WLL2	38	3	6	29	39	103	15	19th	—	—	—
1991–92	WLL2	34	6	7	21	61	95	25	16th	—	—	—
1992–93	NWC2^{[P]}	34	7	7	20	47	82	28	17th	—	—	—
1993–94	NWC2	34	16	8	10	75	52	56	6th	—	—	—
1994–95	NWC2	30	13	8	9	64	44	47	6th	—	—	—
1995–96	NWC2	34	17	9	8	78	55	60	5th	—	—	—
1996–97	NWC2	38	14	10	14	64	72	52	11th	—	—	Q2
1997–98	NWC2	40	17	5	18	69	76	56	13th	—	—	—
1998–99	NWC2	36	11	11	14	51	49	44	13th	—	—	—
1999–2000	NWC2	34	21	8	5	77	31	71	3rd	—	—	Q1
2000–01	NWC2	38	21	11	6	89	44	74	4th^{[Q]}	—	—	Q2
2001–02	NWC2	40	18	9	13	73	63	63	9th	—	—	R2^{[R]}
2002–03	NWC2	34	13	12	9	50	40	51	7th	PR	—	R1
2003–04	NWC2	38	14	11	13	54	64	53	10th	PR	—	R1
2004–05	NWC2	36	16	11	9	75	52	59	6th	EP	—	Q2
2005–06	NWC2	36	23	5	8	82	53	74	3rd†^{[S]}	EP	—	R2
2006–07	NWC1	42	7	6	29	41	113	27	20th	EP	—	R1
2007–08	NWC1	38	5	8	25	42	90	23	20th^{[T]}	EP	—	Q2
2008–09	NWCP^{[U]}	42	11	12	19	68	86	45	17th	—	—	—
2009–10	NWCP	42	12	8	22	47	87	44	17th	—	—	R3
2010–11	Nelson resigned from North West Counties League											
2011–12	NWC1	34	9	5	20	40	83	32	15th	—	—	—
2012–13	NWC1	34	11	9	14	64	76	42	10th	—	—	Q2
2013–14	NWC1	36	29	2	5	135	51	89	1st†	—	—	R1
2014–15	NWCP	40	16	7	17	69	64	55	11th	EP	—	Q2
2015–16	NWCP	42	13	9	20	69	70	48	16th	EP	—	Q2
2016–17	NWCP	42	5	11	26	55	87	25*^{[W]}	21st‡	PR	—	Q1
2017–18	NWC1	42	7	10	25	50	91	31	21st^{[X]}	EP	—	Q2
2018–19	NWC1N	38	12	9	17	60	66	45	14th	—	—	R1
2019–20	NWC1N	28	10	5	13	47	57	35	14th^{[Y]}	—	—	Q1
2020–21	NWC1N	5	1	0	4	11	16	3	17th^{[Z]}	—	—	Q2
2021–22	NWC1N	36	17	7	12	78	65	58	5th^{[AA]}	—	—	—
2022–23	NWC1N	34	13	4	17	56	64	43	11th	—	—	—
2023–24	NWC1N	34	8	5	21	44	79	26*^{[AB]}	18th^{[AC]}	—	—	Q2
2024–25	NWC1N	34	24	1	9	88	38	73	2nd^{[AD]}	—	—	—
2025–26	NWC1N	34	23	6	5	78	43	75	1st†	—	—	R4^{[AE]}

== Key ==
Winners	Runners up	Promoted †	Relegated ‡

Division shown in bold when it changes due to promotion, relegation or league reorganisation.
League record shown in italics when season was abandoned.

Key to league record:

- P = Played
- W = Games won
- D = Games drawn
- L = Games lost
- F = Goals for
- A = Goals against
- Pts = Points
- Pos = Final position
- † = Promoted
- ‡ = Relegated
- * = Nelson had points deducted

Key to divisions:

- CL = Central League
- FL2 = Football League Second Division
- FL3N = Football League Third Division North
- LL = Lancashire League
- LC = Lancashire Combination
- LC1 = Lancashire Combination First Division
- LC2 = Lancashire Combination Second Division
- NELC = North East Lancashire Combination
- NWCP = North West Counties Premier Division
- NWC1 = North West Counties First Division
- NWC1N = North West Counties First Division North
- NWC2 = North West Counties Second Division
- NWC3 = North West Counties Third Division
- WLL2 = West Lancashire League Second Division

Key to cup rounds:

- — = Nelson did not enter the competition
- EP = Extra Preliminary Round
- PR = Preliminary Round
- Q1 = First Qualifying Round
- Q2 = Second Qualifying Round
- Q3 = Third Qualifying Round
- Q4 = Fourth Qualifying Round
- Q5 = Fifth Qualifying Round
- Q6 = Sixth Qualifying Round
- R1 = First Round
- R2 = Second Round
- R3 = Third Round
- R4 = Fourth Round

== Footnotes ==
A.: The FA Trophy competition began in the 1969–70 season.
B.: The FA Vase competition began in the 1974–75 season.
C.: Following incidents involving fans during an FA Cup match, Nelson were suspended by the Lancashire County Football Association in late 1898 and subsequently disbanded until 1900.
D.: Nelson finished four points ahead of second-placed Bradford Park Avenue.
E.: This is Nelson's highest ever league finish.
F.: The 1926–27 season was the first time that Nelson reached the Second Round of the FA Cup. They beat Stockport County 4–1 in the First Round, before being knocked out by Ashington.
G.: Despite finishing bottom of the league, Nelson were re-elected into the Football League and were not relegated.
H.: Nelson lost each of their 21 away matches in the 1930–31 season. Including the final three games of the 1929–30 campaign, they lost 24 consecutive away matches—this is still a Football League record.
I.: Following the disbanding of Nelson, a new club named Nelson Town was formed and briefly played in local leagues until the outbreak of the Second World War.
J.: The total of 139 goals in 1950–51 is Nelson's most ever league goals in a season.
K.: Nelson failed to be re-elected to the Football League at the end of the 1930–31 season, instead being replaced by Chester City.
L.: The total of 136 goals in 1927–28 is Nelson's most League goals conceded in a season.
M.: The Second Qualifying Round was Nelson's best performance in the FA Trophy—they defeated Clitheroe and Winterton Rangers before being knocked out by Emley.
N.: Nelson were one of 18 teams accepted into the Third Division of the newly formed North West Counties Football League.
O.: After their Victoria Park ground was deemed unfit for the North West Counties League Second Division, Nelson were forced to join the West Lancashire League Second Division.
P.: After improvements to their stadium, the club was accepted back into the North West Counties League.
Q.: After the final match of the 2000–01 season, Nelson finished in the third promotion place ahead of Atherton Laburnum Rovers. However, Atherton LR were given the chance to replay their final game after their opponents had fielded an ineligible player. Atherton LR won the replayed tie and finished third ahead of Nelson.
R.: The 2001–02 season saw Nelson reach the Second Round of the FA Vase for the first time. Nelson beat Norton & Stockton Ancients, Garforth Town and Louth United to reach that stage, before losing to Clitheroe in a Second Round replay.
S.: Nelson achieved promotion from the North West Counties Second Division in the 2005–06 season, finishing nine points clear of fourth-placed Winsford United.
T.: Nelson finished bottom of the division but were not relegated thanks to the division being increased to 22 teams for the following season.
U.: For the 2008–09 season, the North West Counties League First Division was renamed to the North West Counties League Premier Division.
V.: In the Third Qualifying Round, Nelson beat Carlisle Red Rose 9–0. This remains their biggest ever FA Cup victory.
W.: Deducted 1 point for fielding an ineligible player in their game against Atherton Collieries of 10 October.
X.: Nelson finished in the relegation places but were not relegated thanks to the league being increased to 2 divisions of 20 teams, North and South, for the following season.
Y.: The season was declared null and void due to the Covid-19 pandemic.
Z.: The season was curtailed due to the Covid-19 pandemic.
AA.: Nelson qualified for the North West Counties Division One North play-off semi-final by finishing in fifth place but were defeated by second-place Holker Old Boys 2–1 after extra time.
AB.: Nelson were deducted 3 points.
AC.: Nelson finished in the relegation places but were not relegated thanks to a reprieve for having the third best Points per game of all sides finishing bottom in Step 6.
AD.: Nelson qualified for the North West Counties Division One North play-off semi-final by finishing in second place but were defeated by fifth-place Euxton Villa 9–10 on penalites following a 1–1 draw after 90 minutes.
AE.: The 2025–26 season saw Nelson reach the Fourth Round of the FA Vase for the first time. Nelson beat Alnwick Town, Boro Rangers, Harrogate Railway Athletic, Charnock Richard and Ramsbottom United to reach that stage, before losing to West Didsbury & Chorlton 1–0.
