= Allan Bottrill =

English association football player

Personal information
- Date of birth: 1905
- Place of birth: Eston, England
- Date of death: 29 September 1929 (aged 24)
- Place of death: Eston, England
- Position: Outside forward

Senior career*
Years	Team	Apps	(Gls)
1921–1925	Middlesbrough	0	(0)
1925–1926	Nelson	1	(0)
1926–1927	York City	0	(0)
- * Club domestic league appearances and goals

Allan Bottrill (1905 – 29 November 1929) was an English professional footballer who played as an outside forward. He played one match in the Football League Third Division North for Nelson in the 1925–26 season.

== Biography ==
Allan Bottrill was born in early 1905 in the town of Eston, North Yorkshire. He was the fourth of seven children born to Walter and Edith Bottrill, and his elder brother Billy was also a professional footballer. After leaving the professional game, Allan Bottrill worked as a plater's assistant in a shipyard. He died from acute pneumonia in his home in Eston on 29 November 1929, at the age of 24.

== Career ==
Bottrill started his playing career with Middlesbrough, for whom he signed as an amateur in August 1921 before turning professional two months later. During his four years with the club, he represented the reserve team on several occasions, but never made a first team appearance. In January 1925, Bottrill transferred to Football League Third Division North outfit Nelson, where his brother Billy was playing, on a free transfer. He initially played for the reserves in the Lancashire Combination. He made his Football League debut for Nelson in the final match of the 1924–25 season, a 1–3 defeat to Durham City on 29 April 1925. In the game, Bottrill played alongside his brother for the only time in his career.

Bottrill failed to make another competitive appearance for Nelson, and was released in the summer of 1926. He subsequently signed for York City in October of the same year, but left the club at the end of the 1926–27 campaign, having failed to make any Midland League appearances. He did not find another professional club and moved into non-league football with South Bank East End in September 1927.
