= Tom Lilley =

English footballer (1899–1964)

Personal information
- Full name: Thomas Lilley
- Date of birth: 13 December 1899
- Place of birth: Newbottle, England
- Date of death: 1964 (aged 64)
- Place of death: County Durham, England
- Height: 5 ft 11 in (1.80 m)
- Position: Full back

Senior career*
| Years | Team | Apps | (Gls) |
| 19??–1922 | Methley Perseverance | | |
| 1922–1923 | Huddersfield Town | 3 | (0) |
| 1923–1924 | Nelson | 14 | (0) |
| 1924–1926 | Hartlepools United | 60 | (0) |
| 1926–1928 | Sunderland | 1 | (0) |
| 1928–1930 | St Mirren | | |
| 1930–1931 | Fulham | 7 | (0) |
| 1931–1932 | Annfield Plain | | |
| 1932 | Herrington Colliery Welfare | | |
| 1932–193? | Shiney Row Swifts | | |
| 1933–193? | Sunderland District Omnibus | | |
| Total | | 85 | (0) |
- * Club domestic league appearances and goals

Thomas Lilley (13 December 1899 – 1964) was a professional footballer who played as a full back. He made 85 appearances in the Football League playing for Huddersfield Town, Nelson, Hartlepool United, Sunderland and Fulham, and spent two seasons in the Scottish League with St Mirren. He also played non-League football for Methley Perseverance, Annfield Plain, Herrington Colliery Welfare, Shiney Row Swifts and the Sunderland District Omnibus Company works team.

== Life and career ==
Lilley was born in 1899 in Newbottle, County Durham, a son of John Lilley, a coal miner, and his wife Sarah. Having acquired a reputation as "one of the best backs in the West Riding League" while playing for Methley Perseverance, and attracted offers from Third Division North clubs Chesterfield and Hartlepools United, the 22-year-old Lilley joined FA Cup-holders Huddersfield Town on a month's trial in late November 1922. To the disappointment of Third Division North clubs Chesterfield and Hartlepools United, who had made "good offers" for his services, the trial proved successful. Lilley made his Football League debut on Christmas Day 1922, standing in for right-back Ned Barkas for a First Division match against Birmingham that finished goalless. He played twice more during March, and was retained for the next season, but made no more first-team appearances.

Lilley joined Second Division club Nelson in mid-November. His hopes of regular football were raised when he displaced player-manager Dave Wilson from the team for the next match, a visit to Coventry City. The match ended as a 4–4 draw, and Lilley did not make another appearance until the new year, when he stood in for the injured Clem Rigg and, according to the Lancashire Daily Post, showed himself to be a "full back of great steadiness and resource". He played regularly from mid-January to April 1924 when, after an unexpected defeat at home to Port Vale put Nelson in increased danger of relegation, he lost his place to his namesake Bob Lilley. Nelson were relegated, and Lilley moved on again, to Hartlepools United of the Third Division North.

He began the season at left-back, but broke a collarbone in collision with an opponent in his seventh match and was out for a couple of months. After three weeks back in the team, he fell heavily and broke it again. He returned to the side, completed the last six matches of the season without incident, signed on for another year, was ever-present in Third Division matches as Hartlepool finished sixth in the 1925–26 table, and earned himself a move to Sunderland. The fee was undisclosed, but the Hartlepool directors "declared themselves satisfied"; it was later reported as £750.

Unable to dislodge Ernie England from the left-back position nor Warney Cresswell from the right, and not considered first reserve when either man was unavailable, Lilley was nevertheless retained for a second season. On 27 August 1927, with Cresswell gone, England unwell and new arrival Bob Thomson suffering from an groin injury, Lilley made his Sunderland debut at left back in a 3–3 draw at home to Portsmouth. It was his only senior appearance for the club, and he was transfer-listed at a fee of £350.

Lilley signed for Scottish First Division club St Mirren. He was brought into the team in November at left back as one of two changes to a relatively settled side, and remained in it, helping the team reach the semi-final of the Scottish Cup and finish eighth in the League. He signed on for another season, was a regular at left back throughout, and turned down the club's offer of another year. He had scored eight goals from 72 matches in all competitions. He was transfer-listed at £750, returned to England and signed for Fulham of the Third Division South. Lilley played in Fulham's first seven matches, after which another recent arrival, Joe Reid, took his place. He appeared twice more in December, but those were his last, and his contract was cancelled at the end of the season.

Lilley returned to the north east of England where he was appointed captain of North-Eastern League club Annfield Plain. He moved on to Herrington Colliery Welfare in February 1932, and in August, became one of three professionals on the books of another Wearside League club, Shiney Row Swifts. By late 1933, he was playing as an amateur for the Sunderland District Omnibus Company team in a local midweek league. He also played bowls competitively. The 1939 Register finds him living in Catherine Terrace, New Herrington, with his wife, Elizabeth, and working as a colliery stoneman. He died in 1964 at the age of 64; his death was registered in the Durham Northern district.
