= Eddie Cameron (footballer) =

Scottish footballer

Personal information
- Date of birth: 1895
- Place of birth: Glasgow, Scotland
- Place of death: Stafford, England
- Height: 5 ft 6 3/4 in (1.70 m)
- Position: Forward

Senior career*
Years	Team	Apps	(Gls)
1919–1921	Clydebank		
1921–1922	Birmingham	6	(1)
1922–1924	Walsall	63	(4)
1924–1925	Nelson	46	(10)
1925–1928	Stafford Rangers		
1928–1929	Exeter City	24	(9)
1929	Nelson	0	(0)
1929–1931	Stafford Rangers		
1931–1933	Cradley Heath		
1933–1934	Hednesford Town		
1934–193?	Stafford Rangers		
- * Club domestic league appearances and goals

Edward S. Cameron (1895 – after 1933) was a Scottish professional footballer who made 139 appearances in the Football League playing for Birmingham, Walsall, Nelson and Exeter City. He played as a forward.

== Career ==
Cameron was born in Glasgow. He began his football career with Clydebank before moving to England to sign for Birmingham in July 1921. Described as "a burly Scot ... never a great goalscorer, but a player who 'employed direct methods'", Cameron made his debut in the First Division on 29 August 1921 in a 2–1 win away at Chelsea. He played five more times, scoring once, but was allowed to leave for Walsall at the end of the 1921–22 season. He played regularly for the club for a little less than two years, then moved up to Nelson of the Second Division in March 1922. Unable to prevent their relegation that season, he contributed to their immediate promotion back to the Second Division in 1924–25.

In 1926 he joined Stafford Rangers, where his prolific goalscoring helped them to the championship of the Birmingham & District League in the 1926–27 season, and helped him earn a return to the Football League with Exeter City. He scored nine goals from 24 Third Division South games – completing his set of all four Football League divisions played in – before an unsuccessful trial at former club Nelson preceded a return to Stafford Rangers and a runners-up medal in 1929–30. He then won his second Birmingham & District League title, this time with Cradley Heath, and scored goals for Hednesford Town, before finishing off his career with yet another return to Stafford Rangers.
