= Manchester North End F.C. =

Manchester N.E.
- Full name: Manchester North End Football Club
- Founded: 1920
- Dissolved: 1939
- Ground: Ceylon Street
Home colours

Manchester North End F.C. was an association football club based in Blackley, Manchester, England.

== History ==
The club was founded as New Cross F.C. and were champions of the 1920–21 Manchester Amateur League (Southern Division). For the 1921–22 season they relocated their ground to Moston Lane, Blackley and joined the Manchester Football League and that season were the Manchester League runners-up. For the next season, 1922–23, the club were members of the higher ranked Lancashire Combination.

In the following close season the club changed its name to Manchester North End F.C. and continued under this new name for the 1923–24 season in the Lancashire Combination. Thereafter from the 1924–25 season, until its demise in 1939, Manchester North End were members of the Cheshire County League.

In addition to the first team in the Lancashire Combination and then the Cheshire County League the club operated a reserve team in the Manchester League and were champions on two occasions.

During most seasons of its existence Manchester North End participated in the FA Cup, England's foremost cup competition, reaching the fourth qualifying round twice.

In 1938, the club lost its ground in Blackley when it was sold for building development, and relocated to Newton Heath. After finishing bottom of the Cheshire League in the 1938–39 season, the club did not seek re-election, and disbanded shortly after the end of the season.

== Colours ==
The club wore blue shirts and white shorts.

== Ground ==
Until 1933 the club played at Leegrange Road, and before the 1933–34 season moved to Charles Street. The club's final ground, for 1938–39, was at Ceylon Street, and was also the Newton Heath Loco Works ground..

== League Records ==
=== First Team ===
Season	League	Pld	W	D	L	GF	GA	Pts	Pos
New Cross F.C.
1921–22	Manchester League	28	19	5	4	78	29	43	2/15
1922–23	Lancashire Combination	34	16	7	11	66	51	39	7/18
Manchester North End F.C.
1923–24	Lancashire Combination	38	17	7	14	71	63	41	11/20
1924–25	Cheshire County League	42	15	7	20	96	95	37	13/22
1925–26	Cheshire County League	42	18	7	17	92	111	43	10/22
1926–27	Cheshire County League	42	24	3	15	156	90	51	8/22
1927–28	Cheshire County League	42	20	7	15	133	101	47	9/22
1928–29	Cheshire County League	38	20	8	10	122	81	48	5/20
1929–30	Cheshire County League	42	14	4	24	115	130	32	16/22
1930–31	Cheshire County League	42	19	4	19	97	119	42	13/22
1931–32	Cheshire County League	40	18	4	18	106	103	40	12/21
1932–33	Cheshire County League	42	24	7	11	124	78	55	3/22
1933–34	Cheshire County League	42	21	4	17	132	105	46	8/22
1934–35	Cheshire County League	42	15	9	18	112	110	39	10/22
1935–36	Cheshire County League	42	17	6	19	94	107	40	14/22
1936–37	Cheshire County League	42	15	5	22	85	113	35	18/22
1937–38	Cheshire County League	42	18	2	22	112	131	38	14/22
1938–39	Cheshire County League	42	7	4	31	57	142	18	22/22

=== Reserves Team ===
Season	League	Pld	W	D	L	GF	GA	Pts	Pos
New Cross F.C.
1922–23	Manchester League	24†	9	5	10	41	40	23	?/14
Manchester North End F.C.
1923–24	Manchester League	25†	9	3	13	37	50	21	?/16
1924–25	Manchester League	30	21	4	5	94	41	46	1/16
1925–26	Manchester League	34	25	3	6	119	41	53	2/18
1926–27	Manchester League	30	15	4	11	75	57	34	8/16
1927–28	Manchester League	32	19	4	9	118	76	42	5/17
1928–29	Manchester League	30†	13	4	13	93	79	30	?/18
1929–30	Manchester League	30	18	4	8	85	62	40	3/16
1930–31	Manchester League	26	13	2	11	82	81	28	7/14
1934–35	Manchester League	33†	13	6	14	82	78	32	?/19
1935–36	Manchester League	32†	13	5	14	74	85	31	?/19
1936–37	Manchester League	30	22	3	5	106	49	47	1/16
1937–38	Manchester League	26	12	5	9	49	48	29	5/14
† = record incomplete

== FA Cup results ==
Season	Round	Opponents	Date	H/A	Result
1923–24	Extra preliminary round	Old Xaverians	8 September 1923	Away	2–0
1923–24	Preliminary round	Eccles United	22 September 1923	Home	1–1
1923–24	Preliminary round	Eccles United	26 September 1923	Away	2–1
1923–24	First qualifying round	Buxton	6 October 1923	Away	2–4
1924–25	Preliminary round	Marine	20 September 1924	Home	6–0
1924–25	First qualifying round	Glossop	4 October 1924	Away	0–3
1925–26	Preliminary round	Buxton	19 September 1925	Home	1–1
1925–26	Preliminary round	Buxton	23 September 1925	Away	2–4
1926–27	Preliminary round	Glossop	18 September 1926	Away	1–4
1927–28	Preliminary round	Glossop	17 September 1927	Home	4–3
1927–28	First qualifying round	Bootle Celtic	1 October 1927	Home	3–0
1927–28	Second qualifying round	Hurst	15 October 1927	Home	2–2
1927–28	Second qualifying round	Hurst	19 October 1927	Away	1–2
1928–29	Preliminary round	St Helens Town	15 September 1928	Away	0–0
1928–29	Preliminary round	St Helens Town	19 September 1928	Home	1–0
1928–29	First qualifying round	Ellesmere Port Town	29 September 1928	Home	6–3
1928–29	Second qualifying round	Whiston Parish	13 October 1928	Home	3–1
1928–29	Third qualifying round	Hurst	27 October 1928	Home	4–1
1928–29	Fourth qualifying round	Rhyl Athletic	10 November 1928	Away	2–3
1929–30	Preliminary round	Northern Nomads	21 September 1929	Home	4–4
1929–30	Preliminary round	Northern Nomads	25 September 1929	Away	4–3
1929–30	First qualifying round	Ellesmere Port Town	5 October 1929	Home	3–1
1929–30	Second qualifying round	Prescot Cables	19 October 1929	Away	2–5
1931–32	Preliminary round	Peasley Cross Athletic	19 September 1931	Home	3–2
1931–32	First qualifying round	Prescot Cables	3 October 1929	Away	2–5
1932–33	Preliminary round	Stalybridge Celtic	17 September 1932	Away	2–4
1933–34	Preliminary round	Prescot Cables	16 September 1933	Away	1–1
1933–34	Preliminary round	Prescot Cables	20 September 1933	Home	3–0
1933–34	First qualifying round	Earle	30 September 1933	Home	9–1
1933–34	Second qualifying round	Stalybridge Celtic	14 October 1933	Away	4–3
1933–34	Third qualifying round	Marine	28 October 1933	Home	5–3
1933–34	Fourth qualifying round	Workington	11 November 1933	Home	3–3
1933–34	Fourth qualifying round	Workington	15 November 1933	Away	3–6
1934–35	Preliminary round	Glossop	15 September 1934	Away	1–3
1935–36	Preliminary round	Northern Nomads	21 September 1935	Away	0–7
1936–37	Preliminary round	Northern Nomads	19 September 1936	Home	4–0
1936–37	First qualifying round	Glossop	3 October 1936	Home	3–2
1936–37	Second qualifying round	South Liverpool	17 October 1936	Away	1–3
1937–38	Preliminary round	Buxton	18 September 1937	Home	3–1
1937–38	First qualifying round	Marine	2 October 1937	Home	2–2
1937–38	First qualifying round	Marine	6 October 1937	Away	3–0
1937–38	Second qualifying round	South Liverpool	16 October 1937	Away	2–2
1937–38	Second qualifying round	South Liverpool	20 October 1937	Home	0–1

== Sources ==
- "New Cross history". Football Club History Database.
- "Manchester North End history". Football Club History Database.
- "The Manchester League 1920–1960". Non-League Football Matters.
- "Lancashire Combination 1909–1925". Non-League Football Matters.
- "Cheshire County League 1919–1940". Non-League Football Matters.
- "The FA Cup results archive". The FA.
