= Ambrose Harris =

English footballer

Personal information
- Date of birth: 29 October 1902
- Place of birth: Briercliffe, England
- Date of death: 1952 (aged 49)
- Place of death: Briercliffe, England
- Height: 5 ft 7 in (1.70 m)
- Position: Half-back

Senior career*
Years	Team	Apps	(Gls)
- Briercliffe
1924–1928	Nelson	58	(1)
1928–1931	Barnoldswick Town	?	(?)
	Brierfield Central	?	(?)
- * Club domestic league appearances and goals

Ambrose Harris (29 October 1902 – 1952) was an English professional footballer who played in a number of positions, mainly as a half-back. He played in the Football League with Nelson, making almost 60 first-team appearances for the club in a four-year spell. He also played with several non-league sides throughout his career, including Barnoldswick Town.

== Biography ==
Ambrose Harris was born on 29 October 1902 in Harle Syke, in the parish of Briercliffe, near Burnley in Lancashire. He lived in the village throughout his life and died there in the summer of 1952, at the age of 49.

== Career ==
Harris started his football career with his local club Briercliffe before joining Football League Third Division North side Nelson at the start of the 1924–25 season. Harris made his professional debut on 25 December 1924 in the 1–0 victory against Chesterfield at Seedhill. He enjoyed a run of five matches in the first-team during March–April 1925, making a total of eight appearances in his first senior season. Harris played in the reserve team at the beginning of the 1925–26 campaign, but was recalled to the starting line-up for the 1–1 draw with Grimsby Town on 5 December 1925. He went on to play the following ten matches, before his place in the team was taken by Ernie Braidwood. Harris returned to the side on 27 February 1926, for the 4–0 win at home against Durham City. Altogether he played 22 league games for Nelson during the campaign as the team finished eighth in the division.

Harris lost his first-team place to new signing Jim Baker at the start of the next campaign, but was reinstated to the side following the 1–4 loss away at Stoke City on 11 September 1926. He played at inside forward for the first time in the away match against Lincoln City on 9 October, and scored his first professional goal in a 4–1 Nelson win. Harris remained with Nelson until the end of the 1927–28 season, when he left the club after playing a total of 58 first-team matches during his four years at Seedhill. He signed for non-league outfit Barnoldswick Town in the summer of 1928. Harris played three seasons with the team before joining Brierfield Central at the start of the 1931–32 campaign, where he ended his career some time later.

== Style of play ==
Because of his ability with both feet, Harris was able to play in a number of positions in the defense, mostly right-half and left-half, although he occasionally played as an inside forward. He was described as being a "clever dribbler" and a "perceptive passer", although he lacked strength due to being relatively short.
