= Billy Bottrill =

English footballer

Personal information
- Full name: Walter Gibson Bottrill
- Date of birth: 8 January 1903
- Place of birth: Eston, England
- Date of death: 29 September 1986 (aged 83)
- Place of death: Middlesbrough, England
- Height: 5 ft 9 in (1.75 m)
- Positions: Inside right; outside right; striker

Senior career*
Years	Team	Apps	(Gls)
- Southbank
1922–1924	Middlesbrough	18	(0)
1924–1928	Nelson	121	(35)
1928–1929	Rotherham United	30	(11)
1929–1930	York City	39	(18)
1930–1933	Wolverhampton Wanderers	101	(42)
1933–1934	Huddersfield Town	12	(1)
1934	Chesterfield	16	(5)
Total		336	(112)
- * Club domestic league appearances and goals

Walter Gibson "Billy" Bottrill (8 January 1903 – 29 September 1986) was an English professional footballer. His brother Allan also played professional football for Nelson.

== Career ==
Bottrill began his professional career with league side Middlesbrough but after two years, moved to the non-league with Nelson. After over 120 games for the club he earned a return to the English Football League with Rotherham United in 1928. He remained with the Millers for just a single season before joining York City, where he was their top scorer for the 1929–30 season, with 20 goals.

He was signed by Wolverhampton Wanderers in Summer 1930 and made his Wolves debut on 30 August 1930 in a 4–3 win at Nottingham Forest. He scored 16 goals in his first season at Molineux and hit 21 in the following year as the club won the Second Division championship.

He remained in the Wolves side for the majority of their return to the top flight, scoring 7 further goals in what proved his final season with the club, as they narrowly avoided relegation. In summer 1933, he moved to fellow First Division club Huddersfield Town, but after injury was allowed to join Chesterfield, where he ended his career.

He died on 29 September 1986.
