= Fred Smith (footballer, born 1901) =

English footballer

Personal information
- Full name: Frederick Smith
- Date of birth: 1901
- Place of birth: Blackburn, England
- Height: 5 ft 8 in (1.73 m)
- Position: Centre forward

Senior career*
| Years | Team | Apps | (Gls) |
| 1922–1924 | Blackburn Rovers | 0 | (0) |
| 1924–1926 | Nelson | 2 | (0) |
- Fleetwood
- Darwen
- William Dickinson & Son (Blackburn)
- * Club domestic league appearances and goals

Frederick Smith (1901 – after 1926) was an English professional footballer who played as a centre forward. After starting his career with his hometown club Blackburn Rovers, he joined Nelson in 1924 and went on to make two appearances in the Football League Third Division North over the following two seasons. After leaving Nelson in 1926, Smith moved into non-League football with Fleetwood Town, Darwen, and as an amateur with William Dickinson & Son of Blackburn.
