= Wilf Denwood =

English footballer

Personal information
- Full name: Wilfred Denwood
- Date of birth: 26 March 1900
- Place of birth: Heywood, England
- Date of death: 26 October 1959 (aged 59)
- Place of death: Heywood, England
- Position: Outside forward

Senior career*
Years	Team	Apps	(Gls)
1923–1925	Bacup Borough	?	(?)
1925	New Brighton	5	(0)
1925	Nelson	3	(0)
1926–1927	Witton Albion	?	(?)
1927–1928	Heywood Street United Methodists	?	(?)
1928–1929	Horwich RMI	?	(?)
1929–19??	Heywood St James	?	(?)
- * Club domestic league appearances and goals

Wilfred Denwood (26 March 1900 – 26 October 1959) was an English professional footballer who played as an outside forward. Born in Heywood, Lancashire, he played in the Football League for Nelson and New Brighton in the 1920s.

== Career ==
Denwood started his career in the 1923–24 season, when he joined Bacup Borough of the Lancashire Combination. In February 1925, he was signed by Football League Third Division North side New Brighton. He made his professional debut on 7 March 1925 in the 0–5 defeat away to Nelson. He spent much of his time with New Brighton in the reserve team, making only five League appearances for the club.

At the start of the following season, Denwood was offered a two-month trial period with Nelson. He played in two pre-season exhibition matches and subsequently played in three Football League fixtures, making his debut for the club in the 2–1 win over Crewe Alexandra. Two days later, he appeared in the 1–5 defeat to Ashington, and his final Nelson game came on 5 September 1925 in the 0–1 loss to Lincoln City. After the match, he left the club after failing to secure an extension to his trial contract. He then spent the remainder of the 1925–26 campaign without a club.

In the summer of 1926, Denwood joined Cheshire League outfit Witton Albion and the following season, he played amateur football with the Heywood Street United Methodists. In September 1928, Denwood returned to the Lancashire Combination with Horwich RMI. He again only stayed one season before leaving to play for Heywood St James, where he ended his playing career.
