= Leigh Collins =

English footballer

Personal information
- Full name: Leigh Richman Collins
- Date of birth: 5 March 1901
- Place of birth: Liverpool, Lancashire, England
- Date of death: 4 October 1975 (aged 74)
- Place of death: Birkenhead, England
- Height: 5 ft 8 1/2 in (1.74 m)
- Position: Half-back

Senior career*
Years	Team	Apps	(Gls)
1921–1923	Wigan Borough	5	(0)
1923–1924	Nelson	13	(0)
1924–1925	New Brighton	11	(0)
1925–1926	Crewe Alexandra	0	(0)
1926–19xx	Stalybridge Celtic	?	(?)
Total		29	(0)
- * Club domestic league appearances and goals

Leigh Richman Collins (5 March 1901 – 4 October 1975) was an English professional footballer who played as a half-back. He played in the Football League for Wigan Borough, Nelson and New Brighton.

He married Mary Beatrice McMinn, and had one daughter, Cynthia Audrey, born 15 April 1927.
