= Edgar Chadwick (footballer, born 1891) =

English footballer and manager

Personal information
- Full name: Edgar Chadwick
- Date of birth: March 1891
- Place of birth: Blackburn, England
- Date of death: January quarter 1963
- Place of death: Nelson, England
- Height: 5 ft 8 in (1.73 m)
- Position: Inside forward

Senior career*
Years	Team	Apps	(Gls)
1916–1920	Blackburn Rovers	0	(0)
1920–1921	Nelson	?	(?)
1921	Accrington Stanley	?	(?)
1921	Seedhill	?	(?)
1921–1922	Great Harwood	?	(?)
1922–1923	Bacup Borough	?	(?)
1923–1926	Nelson	36	(19)
1926–1927	Lancaster Town	?	(?)
1927–1928	Clitheroe	?	(?)
1928–1929	Morecambe	?	(?)
1929–1932	Bacup Borough	?	(?)
1932–1935	Nelson	?	(?)

Managerial career
- 1935–1936: Nelson
- 1936–1939: Nelson Town
- * Club domestic league appearances and goals

Edgar Chadwick (March 1891 – January quarter 1963) was an English professional footballer who played as an inside forward. He played in the Football League for Nelson.
