= Joe Eddleston =

English footballer

Personal information
- Full name: Joseph Eddleston
- Date of birth: 29 December 1896
- Place of birth: Oswaldtwistle, England
- Date of death: 24 March 1955 (aged 58)
- Place of death: Blackburn, England
- Height: 5 ft 5 in (1.65 m)
- Position: Inside forward

Senior career*
Years	Team	Apps	(Gls)
1919–1920	Blackburn Rovers	7	(3)
1921–1926	Nelson	183	(97)
1926–1932	Swindon Town	202	(66)
1932–1933	Accrington Stanley	40	(12)
Total		432	(178)
- * Club domestic league appearances and goals

Joseph Eddleston (29 December 1896 – 24 March 1959) was an English professional footballer who played as an inside forward. He played in The Football League for Blackburn Rovers, Nelson, Swindon Town and Accrington Stanley. Altogether, he made over 400 league appearances, scoring 178 goals.
