= Ernie Braidwood =

English footballer

Personal information
- Full name: Ernest Braidwood
- Date of birth: 14 April 1895
- Place of birth: Heywood, Lancashire, England
- Date of death: 16 July 1968 (aged 73)
- Place of death: Heywood, England
- Height: 6 ft 0 in (1.83 m)
- Position: Centre half

Youth career
- York Street Congregational

Senior career*
Years	Team	Apps	(Gls)
1920	Chesterfield Municipal	?	(?)
1920–1922	Oldham Athletic	10	(1)
1922–1926	Nelson	128	(10)
1926–1930	Rochdale	87	(1)
1930	Great Harwood	?	(?)
1930	New Mills	?	(?)
- * Club domestic league appearances and goals

Ernest Braidwood (14 April 1895 – 16 July 1968) was an English professional footballer who played as a centre half. He started his senior career with Chesterfield Municipal before signing his first professional contract with Football League First Division side Oldham Athletic in August 1920. He made nine league appearances in his first season with the club and scored one goal, against Derby County. A change in manager for the 1921–22 season meant Braidwood found it difficult to break into the first-team, and he played only once in the campaign.

In the summer of 1922 Braidwood was signed on a free transfer by his former Oldham teammate David Wilson, who had since become player-manager of Football League Third Division North outfit Nelson. He was inserted straight into the team for the first league match of the season, a 2–6 defeat away at Bradford Park Avenue. Braidwood scored six goals in 38 games as Nelson won the division in 1923, and achieved promotion to the Football League Second Division. He scored against Fulham in the 1–1 draw at Seedhill on 22 December 1923, and played in Nelson's 1–0 win against Manchester United on 8 March 1924. Braidwood continued to play for Nelson until March 1926 when he signed for Rochdale, where he scored one goal in 87 league matches before moving into non-League football with Great Harwood and New Mills in 1930.

Braidwood's cousin, James Pearson, also played professional football for Nelson.
