= Bob Lilley (footballer, born 1893) =

English footballer (1893–1964)

Personal information
- Full name: Robert Lilley
- Date of birth: 3 April 1893
- Place of birth: Bolton, England
- Date of death: 12 January 1964 (aged 70)
- Place of death: Bolton, England
- Height: 5 ft 7 in (1.70 m)
- Position: Defender

Senior career*
Years	Team	Apps	(Gls)
1914–1915	Rochdale	?	(?)
1919–1920	Horwich RMI	?	(?)
1920–1925	Nelson	66	(0)
- * Club domestic league appearances and goals

Robert Lilley (3 April 1893 – 12 January 1964) was an English professional footballer who played as a defender. He played 66 matches in the Football League for Nelson.
