= Harry Abbott (footballer, born 1895) =

English footballer

Personal information
- Full name: Henry Abbott
- Date of birth: 15 March 1895
- Place of birth: Preston, England
- Date of death: 1968 (aged 72–73)
- Place of death: Preston, England
- Height: 5 ft 10 in (1.78 m)
- Position: Goalkeeper

Senior career*
| Years | Team | Apps | (Gls) |
| 1914–1921 | Lancaster Town | | |
| 1921–1922 | Portsmouth | 0 | (0) |
| 1922–1927 | Nelson | 154 | (0) |
| 1927–1929 | Luton Town | 55 | (0) |
| 1929–1930 | Exeter City | 0 | (0) |
| 1930–1931 | Lancaster Town | | |
| 1931–1932 | Rochdale | 32 | (0) |
| 1932–1933 | Wigan Athletic | 32 | (0) |
| Total | | 273 | (0) |
- * Club domestic league appearances and goals

Henry Abbott (15 March 1895 – 1968) was an English professional footballer who played as a goalkeeper in the Football League for Nelson, Luton Town and Rochdale. He also played for newly formed Wigan Athletic in their inaugural season.
