= David Wilson (footballer, born 1884) =

Scottish footballer (1884–1959)

Personal information
- Full name: David Wilson
- Date of birth: 14 January 1884
- Place of birth: Prestwick, Scotland
- Date of death: 9 April 1959 (aged 75)
- Place of death: London, England
- Height: 5 ft 7 1/2 in (1.71 m)
- Position: Wing half

Senior career*
Years	Team	Apps	(Gls)
- Irvine Meadow
1901–1903	St Mirren	2	(1)
1903–1904	Hamilton Academical	5	(0)
1904–1907	Bradford City	12	(1)
1907–1921	Oldham Athletic	406	(18)
1921–1924	Nelson	95	(3)
Total		520	(23)

International career
1913	Scotland	1	(0)

Managerial career
- 1921–1925: Nelson
- 1928–1929: Exeter City
- 1929–1930: Stuttgarter Kickers
- * Club domestic league appearances and goals

David Wilson (14 January 1884 – 9 April 1959) was a Scottish professional footballer who played as a wing half. He started his career in the Scottish Football League and went on to play 475 matches in the English Football League, mainly for Oldham Athletic, before retiring at the age of 40. He appeared in one international match for Scotland in 1913. After retiring, he became manager of Nelson and Exeter City.

== Playing career ==
=== Club ===
Born into a farming family in Prestwick and raised in Dundonald, South Ayrshire, Wilson started playing football with local junior side Irvine Meadow. His professional career started in 1901 when he signed for Scottish League Division One club St Mirren. He failed to make an appearance in his first season, but played twice in 1902–03, scoring one goal. He left in 1903 to join Division Two side Hamilton Academical, where he stayed for one season, playing five league games for the club. In 1904, he moved to England to join Football League Second Division side Bradford City. He made 12 league appearances and scored one goal in two years with the team, but left at the end of the 1905–06 campaign.

Wilson signed for Lancashire Combination outfit Oldham Athletic in the summer of 1906 and became a first-team regular almost at once, playing 38 matches and scoring two goals in his inaugural season. For the 1907–08 campaign, Oldham joined the Second Division, and Wilson appeared in every league match between 1907 and 1911. He scored two goals in the 1909–10 season as the Latics achieved promotion to the First Division, and continued to play regularly until the outbreak of the First World War, when competitive football in England was stopped at the end of the 1914–15 campaign – Oldham had finished runners-up that season, one point behind champions Everton.

After the end of the war when the league recommenced, he retained his place in the Oldham side, appearing in every match of the 1919–20 season. At the conclusion of the 1920–21 campaign, Wilson left Oldham Athletic, having played 368 league matches and scored 16 goals in a 15-year spell with the club.

Wilson joined newly promoted Football League Third Division North team Nelson in 1921. He was appointed player-manager and handed the role of taking charge of the team's inaugural season in the Football League. He played 34 matches in his first season with Nelson and scored three goals, including one penalty kick, the first he had scored in his career. Wilson went on to play 30 league games in the following campaign, leading his team to promotion to the Second Division. He played a further 31 matches for Nelson before retiring from playing at the end of the 1923–24 season, at the age of 40.

=== International ===
On 5 April 1913, Wilson made his international debut for Scotland in the 0–1 defeat to England at Stamford Bridge, in which he played alongside his brother Andrew (the last occasion when siblings took the field together until after the Second World War).

== Managerial career ==
Wilson continued as manager of Nelson after his playing retirement but left the club at the end of the 1924–25 season, despite the team having finished as runners-up in the Third Division North. He subsequently spent three years working as a stockbroker, before having a spell in charge of Exeter City in the Football League Third Division South between March 1928 and February 1929. He was in charge of the team for 42 matches, with the side winning 11 matches, drawing 10 and losing 21. The club struggled under Wilson's tenure and finished 21st out of 22 in the division the season he left. He then spent a year in Germany coaching Stuttgarter Kickers.

== Personal life ==
After his retirement from football management, Wilson worked as a stockbroker.

He was one of four brothers who played professional football: Andrew set various club records for Sheffield Wednesday and was also a Scotland international and later a manager, including at Oldham; James played with St Mirren and Preston North End and was selected for the Scottish Football League XI; and Alec played for Preston and Oldham.
