= Seedhill Football Ground =

Former English sports venue

Seedhill Football Ground Seedhill Stadium
- Location: Seedhill Stadium; Carr Road; Nelson; Lancashire, England
- Coordinates: 53°50′21″N 2°13′12″W
- Opened: 1889
- Closed: 1971

The Seedhill Football Ground also known as the Seedhill Stadium, was a primarily a football stadium in Nelson, Lancashire from 1889 to 1971. During their tenure at Seedhill, Nelson were members of the English Football League between 1921 and 1931.

== History ==
It was the home of various incarnations of current North West Counties League Division One side Nelson F.C. from 1889, when the Burnley Express reported an opening senior fixture played against Burnley on 16 March 1889 (Lost 0-6).

During the 1912–13 season, a two-storey brick-built pavilion was constructed at the town end of the ground which housed the changing rooms on the ground floor with the boardroom and an office on the upper floor. The pavilion, officially opened by Albert Smith MP on 7 December 1912, when Nelson beat Accrington Stanley 2-1 in a Lancashire Combination fixture, had a centre gable and a balcony overlooking the pitch. On 2 August 1913, the Burnley Express newspaper reported that, according to Nelson's annual financial statement, the cost of building the pavilion was £649.19s.7d. On 7 November 1932, the pavilion came close to burning down when a fire broke out in the boardroom. No-one was in the building at the time however heat from the fire burst a water pipe which put the fire out.

In 1921, with the help of volunteers, the covered terrace on the cricket field side was completed and was able to accommodate 3,000 people. In the same year, a wall was built around the park end and on the Carr Road side of the ground at a cost of £3,000. The cover over the cricket field side was blown down during a severe gale on the evening of 9 January 1936. The Burnley Express newspaper reported that the main gateway to the field on the Carr Road side was also blown down and damage was done to the fence on that side of the ground.

At the end of the 1922–23 Football League season, Nelson finished top of the Third Division North and were promoted to the Second Division, now known as the EFL Championship. Seedhill needed to be upgraded for the forthcoming season so, in 1923, a new wooden grandstand was built behind the existing stand on Carr Road. The new stand cost £5,000 to build and was able to accommodate 2,000 people on wooden bench seating. The old stand was dismantled and sold to Barnoldswick Town F.C.leaving a standing area in front of the new stand. Seedhill now had a capacity of 20,000.

Work started on the park end roof in September 1929 and was completed by November that year at a cost of £690 which was raised by the supporters' club. The cover provided accommodation for 5,000 people standing on a shallow-raked earth and cinder bank. This end of the ground became known as 'The Scratting Shed.' Concrete terracing was laid on the standing area in front of the main stand in June 1952. There was a spectator bank on each corner of the town end of the ground - the one nearest Carr Road had a wooden building at the top which was called the 'Alpine Bar'. The highest attendance at the stadium was 14,979 for the Third Division (North) match between Nelson and Bradford City on 27 April 1929.

During March 1967, speedway and stock car promoter Mike Parker applied for a licence for Seedhill Stadium hosted the speedway for the first time on 29 July 1967. The Nelson Admirals speedway team raced at the venue throughout 1968 and 1969. In June 1970, halfway through the season, promoters Les Whaley, Mike Parker and Bill Bridgett moved the British League Division Two side across the Pennines to Bradford. Parker moved the team following difficulties in finding available race days for speedway and stock car racing. Stock cars remained until the stadium was demolished.

The corner of the ground between the main stand and the park end served as the pits area for both speedway and stock cars. In 1969, visiting Romford rider Ross Gilbertson set a track record of 59 seconds at the stadium.

=== 1970s and '80s ===
Nelson's last game at Seedhill was a Lancashire Combination fixture on Sunday 28 March 1971 against local rivals, Clitheroe F.C. Local newspaper, the Nelson Leader, reported that a crowd of over a thousand gathered to see Clitheroe beaten by five goals to three in what was not only the last game but also the first Sunday game at the stadium. Nelson then moved to their current Victoria Park ground on Lomeshaye Holme for the start of the 1971–72 season. Seedhill football ground was demolished in the early 1980s to make way for the M65 motorway.

=== 21st century ===
As of early 2025, the site is currently being developed as the home of a new Pendle police station. There is currently an all weather athletics track and football pitch close to the site of Seedhill Stadium known as the Seedhill Athletics and Fitness Centre. This facility is located on the opposite side of the cricket field in Surrey Road and has never been home to Nelson Football Club.

The ground was situated next to the Seedhill Cricket Ground, currently the home of Lancashire League cricket team Nelson Cricket Club.
