= 1921–22 Nelson F.C. season =

Nelson F.C.
1921–22 season
- Manager: David Wilson (player-manager)
- Football League Third Division North: 16th (W:13 D:7 L:18 Pts:33)
- FA Cup: Sixth Qualifying Round
- Highest home attendance: 9,000 (vs Wigan Borough, 27 August 1921)
Home colours

The 1921–22 season was the 41st season of football played by Nelson. It was their first season as a professional club, and their first in the Football League Third Division North, after the restructuring of the English league system. The side ended the season in 16th place in the division, finishing behind Barrow on goal average. The campaign started on 27 August 1921 with a 1–2 defeat by Wigan Borough, which was attended by a then record crowd of 9,000 at Seedhill. Nelson's first win in the Football League came on 3 September 1921, when they beat Wigan Borough 4–1 at Springfield Park. The season ended with a 0–0 draw at home to Tranmere Rovers on 6 May 1922. By the end of the campaign, the side had a league record of 13 wins, seven draws and 18 defeats, giving them a total of 33 points.

In the FA Cup, the side entered the competition in the Fourth Qualifying Round. They defeated Accrington Stanley and then won their Fifth Qualifying Round match 3–2 at home to Rochdale. However, they did not progress past the Sixth Qualifying Round, when they were knocked out by Worksop Town.

== Season review ==
=== Events ===
- 27 August: Billy Halligan scores Nelson's first-ever goal in the Football League, two minutes into the first game of the season against Wigan Borough.
- 3 September: Nelson get their first win in the Football League, defeating Wigan Borough 4–1 at Springfield Park.
- 8 October: Nelson's six-match unbeaten run in the league comes to an end following a 1–4 defeat away at Accrington Stanley.
- 19 November: Nelson progress through to the Fifth Qualifying Round of the FA Cup with a 1–0 win over Accrington Stanley.
- 3 December: A 3–2 victory over Rochdale sees Nelson through to the Sixth Qualifying Round of the FA Cup.
- 17 December: Nelson are knocked out of the FA Cup, losing 1–2 away at Worksop Town.
- 2 January: The side achieve their biggest win of the campaign, a 4–0 victory against Wrexham at Seedhill.
- 28 January: Hartlepools United inflict Nelson's heaviest defeat of the season, a 6–1 drubbing at Victoria Park.
- 6 May: Nelson draw their final league game of the season, a 0–0 draw at home to Tranmere Rovers.

=== League progress ===
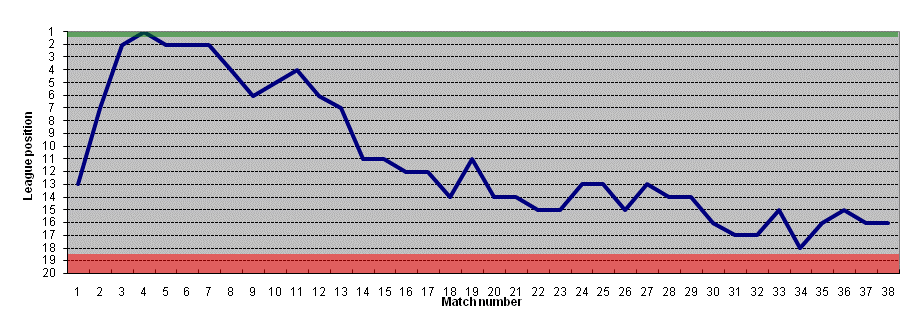
The chart below shows Nelson's league positions throughout the course of the 1921–22 season. The green area (position 1) represents the automatic promotion place to the Football League Second Division, while the red area (positions 19 and 20) shows the teams who had to apply for re-election to the League at the end of the season. The highest position achieved by Nelson during the season was 1st place, after the fourth match. In the middle of the season Nelson slipped down the league table, eventually finishing in 16th position.

== Statistics ==
=== League position ===
Pos	Team	Pld	W	D	L	GF	GA	GAv	Pts
14	Lincoln City	38	14	6	18	48	59	0.814	34
15	Barrow	38	14	5	19	42	54	0.778	33
16	Nelson	38	13	7	18	48	66	0.727	33
17	Wigan Borough	38	11	9	18	46	72	0.639	31
18	Tranmere Rovers	38	9	11	18	51	61	0.836	29

Source: rsssf.com

=== Player details ===
During the 1921–22 season, 29 different players appeared in at least one competitive match for Nelson. The table below shows the number of appearances and goals scored by each player.

Nat.	Position	Player	Third Division (North)		FA Cup		Total
Nat.	Position	Player	Apps	Goals	Apps	Goals	Apps	Goals
(England)	FW	Harold Andrews	8	1	0	0	8	1
(England)	MF	Richard Baird	2	0	0	0	2	0
(Scotland)	FW	John Bennie	12	6	2	0	14	6
(Scotland)	GK	Robert Bruce	7	0	3	0	10	0
(England)	GK	Harry Clegg	5	0	0	0	5	0
(England)	DF	Eddie Eastwood	1	0	0	0	1	0
(England)	FW	Joe Eddleston	37	16	3	1	40	17
(England)	MF	Thomas Garnett	1	0	0	0	1	0
(Ireland)	FW	Billy Halligan	17	6	3	0	20	6
(England)	FW	Harry Hargreaves	13	2	0	0	13	2
(England)	DF	Ray Hartley	1	0	0	0	1	0
(England)	GK	Harry Heyes	26	0	0	0	26	0
(England)	MF	Sid Hoad	16	0	0	0	16	0
(England)	DF	Thomas Jacques	17	1	3	0	20	1
(England)	DF	Bob Lilley	34	0	3	1	37	1
(England)	FW	William McGreevy	3	1	0	0	3	1
(England)	FW	Cecil Marsh	17	2	2	0	19	2
(England)	FW	Harry Mellor	1	0	0	0	1	0
(Scotland)	DF	James Price	20	0	0	0	20	0
(England)	MF	Wilfred Proctor	14	1	2	0	16	1
(England)	DF	Clement Rigg	29	0	3	0	32	0
(Scotland)	DF	John Steel	25	0	0	0	25	0
(England)	DF	Albert Turner	1	0	0	0	1	0
(England)	FW	William Waller	25	7	3	3	28	10
(England)	DF	John Walmsley	1	0	0	0	1	0
(England)	DF	Bob Wilde	36	0	3	0	39	0
(Scotland)	DF	David Wilson	34	3	3	0	37	3
(England)	MF	William Wilson	1	0	0	0	1	0
(England)	MF	James Wootton	14	1	0	0	14	1

FW = Forward, MF = Midfielder, GK = Goalkeeper, DF = Defender

== Match results ==
=== Football League Third Division North ===
27 August 1921 1	Nelson	1–2	Wigan Borough	Nelson
	Halligan 2'	Report	Hodges; Twiss	Stadium: Seedhill; Attendance: 12,000; Referee: I. Baker

3 September 1921 2	Wigan Borough	1–4	Nelson	Wigan
	Hornby	Report	Jacques; Hargreaves; Halligan; Marsh	Stadium: Springfield Park; Attendance: 8,000; Referee: I. Baker

10 September 1921 3	Lincoln City	0–2	Nelson	Lincoln
		Report	Halligan 30'; Hargreaves 39'	Stadium: Sincil Bank; Attendance: 6,000; Referee: A. Scholey

12 September 1921 4	Nelson	1–0	Stalybridge Celtic	Nelson
	Proctor 37'	Report		Stadium: Seedhill; Attendance: 10,000; Referee: J.O. Forshaw

17 September 1921 5	Nelson	0–0	Lincoln City	Nelson
		Report		Stadium: Seedhill; Attendance: 10,000; Referee: A. Scholey

24 September 1921 6	Darlington	0–1	Nelson	Darlington
		Report	Halligan 87'	Stadium: Feethams; Attendance: 10,000; Referee: A. Pellowe

1 October 1921 7	Nelson	1–1	Darlington	Nelson
	Eddleston	Report	Hooper	Stadium: Seedhill; Attendance: 10,000

8 October 1921 8	Accrington Stanley	4–1	Nelson	Accrington
	Green; Hosker; Makin	Report	Halligan	Stadium: Peel Park; Attendance: 14,000; Referee: G.N. Watson

15 October 1921 9	Nelson	0–1	Accrington Stanley	Nelson
		Report	Green (pen.)	Stadium: Seedhill; Attendance: 12,000; Referee: G.N. Watson

22 October 1921 10	Chesterfield	1–2	Nelson	Chesterfield
	Clarke	Report	Eddleston	Stadium: Saltergate; Attendance: 6,000; Referee: C.F. Porter

29 October 1921 11	Nelson	2–0	Chesterfield	Nelson
	Eddleston; Marsh	Report		Stadium: Seedhill; Attendance: 5,000; Referee: C.F. Porter

5 November 1921 12	Crewe Alexandra	2–1	Nelson	Crewe
	Caulfield (pen.); Winterburn	Report	Eddleston	Stadium: Gresty Road; Attendance: 5,000; Referee: H.V. Stott

12 November 1921 13	Nelson	1–2	Crewe Alexandra	Nelson
	Chorlton (o.g.)	Report	Winterburn; Hassall	Stadium: Seedhill; Attendance: 8,000; Referee: H.V. Stott

26 November 1921 14	Wrexham	4–2	Nelson	Wrexham
	Jones; Goode; Burton; Cotton	Report	Bennie; Waller	Stadium: Racecourse Ground; Attendance: 6,000; Referee: A. Scholey

24 December 1921 15	Barrow	0–2	Nelson	Barrow-in-Furness
		Report	Eddleston; Bennie	Stadium: Holker Street; Attendance: 5,000; Referee: S. Rothwell

26 December 1921 16	Nelson	3–5	Durham City	Nelson
	Bennie; Andrews; Waller	Report	Cousins; Dobinson; Young	Stadium: Seedhill; Attendance: 8,000; Referee: E. Farrar

27 December 1921 17	Stalybridge Celtic	2–0	Nelson	Stalybridge
	Petrie; Gee	Report		Stadium: Bower Fold; Attendance: 6,000; Referee: J.O. Forshaw

31 December 1921 18	Ashington	4–0	Nelson	Ashington
	Robertson; Galloway; Dargue	Report		Stadium: Portland Park; Attendance: 5,000; Referee: F. Leigh

2 January 1922 19	Nelson	4–0	Wrexham	Nelson
	Bennie; Waller; Eddleston	Report		Stadium: Seedhill; Attendance: 4,000; Referee: J. Rennie

14 January 1922 20	Nelson	0–2	Ashington	Nelson
		Report	Featherstone (pen.); Dargue	Stadium: Seedhill; Attendance: 3,000; Referee: F. Leigh

21 January 1922 21	Nelson	0–4	Hartlepools United	Nelson
		Report	Parkinson; Burn; Crowther; Yews	Stadium: Seedhill; Attendance: 4,000; Referee: A. Ward

28 January 1922 22	Hartlepools United	6–1	Nelson	Hartlepool
	Parkinson; Robertson; Thomas; Crowther	Report	Eddleston	Stadium: Victoria Park; Attendance: 7,000; Referee: A.Ward

4 February 1922 23	Nelson	3–2	Southport	Nelson
	Wilson (pen.); Bennie; Eddleston	Report	Rawlins; Little	Stadium: Seedhill; Attendance: 4,000; Referee: W.F. Bunnell

11 February 1922 24	Southport	0–1	Nelson	Southport
		Report	Eddleston	Stadium: Haig Avenue; Attendance: 4,000; Referee: W.F. Bunnell

18 February 1922 25	Nelson	2–2	Stockport County	Nelson
	Hallingan; Waller	Report	Heath; Gault	Stadium: Seedhill; Attendance: 8,000; Referee: J.O. Forshaw

25 February 1922 26	Stockport County	3–0	Nelson	Stockport
	Gault; Heath (pen.); Waterall	Report		Stadium: Edgeley Park; Attendance: 10,000; Referee: J.O. Forshaw

4 March 1922 27	Nelson	3–0	Grimsby Town	Nelson
	Eddleston; Waller	Report		Stadium: Seedhill; Attendance: 7,000; Referee: H. Cooper

11 March 1922 28	Grimsby Town	3–1	Nelson	Cleethorpes
	Carmichael (pen.); Casson	Report	Eddleston	Stadium: Blundell Park; Attendance: 9,000; Referee: H. Cooper

18 March 1922 29	Walsall	2–0	Nelson	Walsall
	Reid; Bowyer	Report		Stadium: Fellows Park; Attendance: 5,500; Referee: J. Holmes

1 April 1922 30	Nelson	0–0	Halifax Town	Nelson
		Report		Stadium: Seedhill; Attendance: 7,000; Referee: G.N. Watson

8 April 1922 31	Halifax Town	3–1	Nelson	Halifax
	Jamieson; Dent	Report	Wootton	Stadium: The Shay; Attendance: 2,000; Referee: G.N. Watson

14 April 1922 32	Durham City	2–0	Nelson	Durham
	Wensley; Wilson	Report		Stadium: Kepier Haughs; Attendance: 1,000; Referee: E. Farrar

15 April 1922 33	Rochdale	2–2	Nelson	Rochdale
	Dennison	Report	Eddleston; Wilson	Stadium: Spotland; Attendance: 3,000; Referee: H.W. Andrews

17 April 1922 34	Nelson	1–1	Barrow	Nelson
	McGreevy	Report	Matthews	Stadium: Seedhill; Attendance: 5,000; Referee: S. Rothwell

22 April 1922 35	Nelson	4–1	Rochdale	Nelson
	Eddleston; Wilson	Report	Hill	Stadium: Seedhill; Attendance: 4,000; Referee: H.W. Andrews

25 April 1922 36	Nelson	1–0	Walsall	Nelson
	Waller	Report		Stadium: Seedhill; Attendance: 3,000; Referee: J. Holmes

29 April 1922 37	Tranmere Rovers	4–0	Nelson	Birkenhead
	Campbell; Milnes; Moreton; Rainford	Report		Stadium: Prenton Park; Attendance: 3,000; Referee: J.E. Telford

6 May 1922 38	Nelson	0–0	Tranmere Rovers	Nelson
		Report		Stadium: Seedhill; Attendance: 4,000; Referee: J.E. Telford

=== FA Cup ===
19 November 1921 Q4	Accrington Stanley	0–1	Nelson	Accrington
			Waller	Stadium: Peel Park; Attendance: 10,106; Referee: J.V. Pennington

3 December 1921 Q5	Nelson	3–2	Rochdale	Nelson
	Eddleston; Waller; Lilley (pen.)		Bennett; Dennison	Stadium: Seedhill; Attendance: 6,000; Referee: Unknown

17 December 1921 Q6	Worksop Town	2–1	Nelson	Worksop
	Charlesworth; Bretnall		Waller	Stadium: Central Avenue; Attendance: 5,000; Referee: H. Kirk
