= 1922–23 Nelson F.C. season =

Nelson F.C.
1922–23 season
- Chairman: Mr W. Hartley
- Manager: David Wilson
- Football League Third Division North: 1st (champions)
- FA Cup: Fifth Qualifying Round
- Top goalscorer: League: Joe Eddleston (22); All: Joe Eddleston (23)
- Highest home attendance: 12,000 (vs Chesterfield, 10 March 1923)
- Lowest home attendance: 3,000 (vs Darlington, 23 December 1922)
Home colours

The 1922–23 season was the 42nd season in the history of Nelson F.C. and their second as a professional club in the Football League. After finishing 16th in their inaugural Third Division North campaign in 1921–22, the team performed well above expectations under the guidance of player-manager David Wilson and went on to win the league title. The championship was secured with a 2–0 win over Wrexham on 24 April 1923. Nelson ended the season on 51 points, with a record of 24 wins, three draws and 11 defeats in 38 matches.

Nelson entered the FA Cup in the Fourth Qualifying Round, in which they defeated Rochdale. However, they were knocked out by Stalybridge Celtic in the next round. A total of 19 players were used by Nelson in their 40 first-team matches, only six of whom had played for the club in the previous season. Bob Hutchinson and Ernie Braidwood, both new signings, played every league and cup match. With 23 goals in 36 appearances, Joe Eddleston was the team's top goalscorer for the second season in succession. The highest attendance of the season at the club's Seedhill stadium was 12,000 on two occasions, the first of these the win over Chesterfield on 10 March 1923.

== Background ==
Goalkeeper Joseph Birds was a new signing from Stockport County

In the 1921–22 season, Nelson had played as a professional club in the Football League for the first time, following the restructuring of the league to introduce North and South divisions. Former Scotland international David Wilson remained player-manager of the first-team for the second consecutive season after guiding them to a 16th-placed finish in the previous campaign. Prior to the start of the season, the team did not play any friendly matches, meaning that the team's last competitive match was the 0–0 draw with Tranmere Rovers on 6 May 1921. The only warm-up for the campaign was a practice match between two teams made up of Nelson players. The Nelson Leader reported that this match was satisfying, and hoped that it could be "the precursor of fine sport in the coming season". Before the 1922–23 season, Nelson's only previous title-winning campaign was their Lancashire League championship in 1895–96.

There were a number of first-team personnel changes from the previous campaign, with only six first-team players staying at the club. Centre forward Joe Eddleston, Nelson's top scorer in 1921–22 with 16 league goals, remained along with Clement Rigg, Sid Hoad and Bob Lilley. Scottish defenders John Steel and James Price also continued to play for Nelson. Among those who left the club were Harold Andrews, who joined Bury, and Irish international inside forward Billy Halligan, who retired from professional football.^{[nb 1]} Goalkeepers Harry Heyes and Robert Bruce both moved on in the close season, so Stockport County custodian Joseph Birds was signed as a replacement in June 1922. In an attempt to improve the attacking prowess at the club, Wilson signed experienced inside forward Arthur Wolstenholme on a free transfer from Darlington in May 1922, and Scottish forward Mike McCulloch arrived from Heart of Midlothian for a transfer fee of £150. Wilson also added to the defensive ranks with the signings of his former Oldham Athletic team-mate Ernie Braidwood, and of Jimmy Broadhead on a free transfer from Scunthorpe & Lindsey United.

=== Transfers ===
In
Player	Pos	From	Fee	Date
Ernie Braidwood	DF	Oldham Athletic	Free	May 1922
Jimmy Broadhead	DF	Scunthorpe & Lindsey United	Free	May 1922
Charles Howson	FW	Wombwell	Trial	May 1922
Bob Hutchinson	FW	Ashington	Free	May 1922
Arthur Wolstenholme	FW	Darlington	Free	May 1922
Mike McCulloch	FW	Heart of Midlothian	£150	June 1922
William Bennett	FW	Chorley	Free	June 1922
Joseph Birds	GK	Stockport County	Free	June 1922
John Black	FW	Sunderland	Free	August 1922
Dick Crawshaw	FW	Halifax Town	£100	February 1923
Harry Abbott	GK	Portsmouth	£15	March 1923

FW = Forward, MF = Midfielder, GK = Goalkeeper, DF = Defender

Out
Player	Pos	To	Fee	Date
Richard Baird	FW	Chorley	Free	May 1922
John Bennie	FW	Bo'ness	Free	May 1922
Thomas Garnett	FW	Released		May 1922
Billy Halligan	FW	Retired		May 1922
William McGreevy	FW	Released		May 1922
Cecil Marsh	FW	Released		May 1922
Robert Bruce	GK	Stenhousemuir	Free	June 1922
Harry Heyes	GK	Chorley	Free	June 1922
Thomas Jacques	DF	Great Harwood	Free	June 1922
James Wootton	FW	Hereford United	Free	June 1922
William Waller	FW	Burnley	Free	June 1922
Harold Andrews	FW	Bury	Free	August 1922
Wilfred Proctor	FW	Fleetwood	Free	August 1922
Harry Mellor	FW	South Shore	Free	September 1922
Bob Wilde	DF	Halifax Town	Free	September 1922

== Football League Third Division North ==
Player-manager David Wilson led Nelson to the Third Division North title

Nelson's league campaign started on 26 August 1922 with an away fixture at Bradford Park Avenue, who had been relegated from the Football League Second Division in the previous season. In the highest scoring match of the day, Nelson lost the match 2–6 before a crowd of 10,000 who witnessed Joe Eddleston score his first goal of the season. Bradford Park Avenue were again the opponents the following week for Nelson's first home game of the campaign and the match was won 1–0 by the host side courtesy of a Mike McCulloch goal. Eddleston's second goal of the campaign secured another 1–0 victory, this time against Stalybridge Celtic, at Seedhill on 9 September 1922 to send the team seventh in the table after three matches. A third successive home fixture saw Nelson win 2–0 against Halifax Town with two goals from Eddleston. Nelson could not follow up their earlier victory over Stalybridge Celtic, falling to a 0–2 loss before attaining a fourth win of the campaign against Southport a week later. Another win against Southport, Nelson's fourth since joining the league in 1921, meant September ended as it had started with a 1–0 win which marked Nelson's fifth victory and clean sheet of the month.

October began with a 1–3 defeat away at Ashington, although new signing Arthur Wolstenholme scored his first goal of the campaign, and Nelson's first ever league goal against the Northumberland club. A 2–0 win in the return match with goals from Eddleston and McCulloch took Nelson to the top of the league for the first time in the season the following week, overtaking Wigan Borough at the summit. The month ended with a pair of wins over Tranmere Rovers; the first a 2–0 win on 21 October, and the second a 1–0 success a week later thanks to John Black's first goal in a Nelson jersey. The team failed to score for only the second time in the season in the 0–1 away defeat to Barrow on 4 November. Despite conceding at Seedhill for the first time in the campaign, Nelson atoned for the loss seven days later with a 2–1 victory as a result of strikes from Eddleston and Wolstenholme. Nelson did not play another league match for two weeks, when they faced Rochdale at home. A first Nelson goal for defender Ernie Braidwood could not prevent the side succumbing to a 1–2 reverse, not helped by first-team regulars Wilson and Wolstenholme missing the match due to injury, forcing inexperienced inside-right William Bennett to make his league debut.

In spite of suffering their second defeat of November, Nelson remained top of the league going into December. Their first fixture of the month was a home match against mid-table Darlington on 9 December. Nelson won a close match 3–2 thanks to another Braidwood strike, followed by Eddleston's 10th and 11th goals of the campaign. A hat-trick from inside-forward Wolstenholme gave Nelson a 3–0 victory against the same team on 23 December in front of a season-low attendance of 3,000 at Seedhill. Nelson started the Christmas period with an away game against Halifax Town. Braidwood and Wolstenholme both got on the scoresheet to help the team to a 2–2 draw in front of 18,000 supporters at The Shay. On 26 December, Nelson faced Hartlepools United, to whom they had conceded 10 goals in two matches in the previous season. Wolstenholme netted for the third game in succession as Nelson claimed their first ever win against the club. However, in the first match of 1923, Hartlepools United won the return fixture 5–1. Nelson achieved their first win of the new year on 13 January, a 3–0 triumph against Rochdale courtesy of an Eddleston hat-trick. Nelson lost 0–1 to Lincoln City the following week, the first time they had failed to score in a league fixture for over two months. January came to a conclusion with a 2–1 win over the same team, goals from Eddleston and McCulloch giving Nelson the victory.

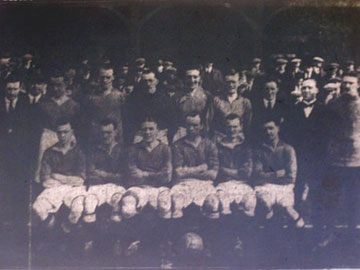
The Nelson team that won the Third Division North: Birds, Black, Broadhead, Braidwood, Crawshaw, Eddleston, Hoad, Hutchinson, McCulloch, Rigg, Wolstenholme

Nelson attained a first ever win against Durham City on 3 February 1923, and this was followed by a 4–0 win over the same side. The win saw Sid Hoad and Bob Hutchinson each net their first of the campaign, and striker Eddleston increase his tally for the season to 19. A goal by Black was not enough to prevent Nelson's winning streak come to an end on 17 February with a 1–3 defeat away at Wigan Borough. Nelson made up for the loss the following week, exacting a 1–0 win over Wigan, with new signing Dick Crawshaw scoring on his Nelson debut. At the beginning of March, Nelson achieved back-to-back victories against Chesterfield, the second a 4–0 win which saw a second goal in three games for Crawshaw and two goals from utility man Black, who was playing in an unfamiliar centre-forward role. Nelson took only one point from the next two matches against Crewe Alexandra. The team failed to score in both games, the only time in the season they did so in successive matches. Entering the Easter period, Eddleston's 20th league goal of the campaign earned Nelson a 1–1 draw with Grimsby Town at Seedhill on 31 March.

Nelson's winless streak extended to four games when they lost 1–2 away to Wrexham at the start of April, although Crawshaw continued his good vein of goalscoring form, netting his third in seven games. Wolstenholme and Braidwood scored to give Nelson a 2–0 win over Grimsby on 7 April, before beating local rivals Accrington Stanley 2–1 at Seedhill. After another win against Accrington the following weekend, Nelson went into the home match against Wrexham on 24 April requiring a win to secure the Third Division North championship. Several mill-owners in the town closed their factories early so that supporters could attend the match on time. Over 12,000 spectators attended Seedhill and saw Nelson achieve a 2–0 victory thanks to first-half strikes from Crawshaw and Eddleston. Player-manager David Wilson claimed he was "the happiest man in Nelson" as his side gained promotion to the Second Division for the first time in their history. The win was followed by a team procession around the town, and the celebrations continued into the next match as the team claimed a third consecutive clean sheet with a 3–0 win at home to Walsall. However, the season ended disappointingly for Nelson as they suffered their heaviest defeat of the season, a 0–5 loss to Walsall, on 5 May 1923.

=== Match results ===
Key

- In Result column, Nelson's score shown first
- H = Home match
- A = Away match
- — = Attendance not known^{[nb 2]}
- o.g. = Own goal

Results

Date	Opponents	Result	Goalscorers	Attendance
26 August 1922	Bradford Park Avenue (A)	2–6	Eddleston, Howie (o.g.)	10,000
2 September 1922	Bradford Park Avenue (H)	1–0	McCulloch	7,000
9 September 1922	Stalybridge Celtic (H)	1–0	Eddleston	5,000
12 September 1922	Halifax Town (H)	2–0	Eddleston (2)	5,000
16 September 1922	Stalybridge Celtic (A)	0–2		—
23 September 1922	Southport (H)	2–0	McCulloch (2)	7,500
30 September 1922	Southport (A)	1–0	Eddleston	5,000
7 October 1922	Ashington (H)	1–3	Wolstenholme	7,000
14 October 1922	Ashington (A)	2–0	McCulloch, Eddleston	8,000
21 October 1922	Tranmere Rovers (A)	2–0	Eddleston (2)	6,000
28 October 1922	Tranmere Rovers (H)	1–0	Black	7,000
4 November 1922	Barrow (A)	0–1		4,000
11 November 1922	Barrow (H)	2–1	Wolstenholme, Eddleston	7,000
25 November 1922	Rochdale (H)	1–2	Braidwood	6,000
9 December 1922	Darlington (A)	3–2	Braidwood, Eddleston (2)	5,583
23 December 1922	Darlington (H)	3–0	Wolstenholme (3)	3,000
25 December 1922	Halifax Town (A)	2–2	Braidwood, Wolstenholme	18,000
30 December 1922	Hartlepools United (H)	4–1	Eddleston, Wolstenholme (2), McCulloch	5,000
6 January 1923	Hartlepools United (A)	1–5	Wolstenholme	5,500
13 January 1923	Rochdale (A)	3–0	Eddleston (3)	6,000
20 January 1923	Lincoln City (A)	0–1		4,000
27 January 1923	Lincoln City (H)	2–1	McCulloch, Eddleston	—
3 February 1923	Durham City (A)	1–0	Eddleston	3,000
10 February 1923	Durham City (H)	4–0	Hoad, Eddleston, Hutchinson	5,000
17 February 1923	Wigan Borough (A)	1–3	Black	15,000
24 February 1923	Wigan Borough (H)	1–0	Crawshaw	10,000
3 March 1923	Chesterfield (A)	2–1	Black, Wolstenholme	14,280
10 March 1923	Chesterfield (H)	4–0	Black (2), Braidwood, Crawshaw	12,000
17 March 1923	Crewe Alexandra (H)	0–0		10,000
24 March 1923	Crewe Alexandra (A)	0–1		7,000
31 March 1923	Grimsby Town (H)	1–1	Eddleston	8,000
2 April 1923	Wrexham (A)	1–2	Crawshaw	10,000
7 April 1923	Grimsby Town (A)	2–0	Wolstenholme, Braidwood	6,000
14 April 1923	Accrington Stanley (H)	2–1	Crawshaw, Broadhead	8,000
21 April 1923	Accrington Stanley (A)	1–0	Braidwood	10,000
24 April 1923	Wrexham (H)	2–0	Crawshaw, Eddleston	12,000
28 April 1923	Walsall (H)	3–0	Eddleston, Wolstenholme (2)	7,000
5 May 1923	Walsall (A)	0–5		2,500

=== Final league position ===
Pos	Team	Pld	W	D	L	GF	GA	GAv	Pts	Promotion or relegation
1	Nelson (C, P)	38	24	3	11	61	41	1.488	51	Promotion to the Second Division
2	Bradford (Park Avenue)	38	19	9	10	67	38	1.763	47	
3	Walsall	38	19	8	11	51	44	1.159	46	
4	Chesterfield	38	19	7	12	68	52	1.308	45	
5	Wigan Borough	38	18	8	12	64	39	1.641	44	

Source: rsssf.com
(C) Champions; (P) Promoted

== FA Cup ==
Along with all the clubs in the Third Division North, Nelson entered the FA Cup in the Fourth Qualifying Round for the 1922–23 season. For their first match on 18 November 1922, Nelson were drawn away at league rivals Rochdale, who they had beaten 3–2 in the Fifth Qualifying Round the previous season. Nelson emerged from the match with a 1–0 victory courtesy of an Eddleston goal, putting them into the Fifth Qualifying Round for only the fourth time since they first competed in the FA Cup in 1894. For the next round, Nelson were drawn against Stalybridge Celtic at Bower Fold, where they had been beaten 0–2 in the league on 16 September. In their first ever cup tie against Stalybridge, Nelson were defeated 1–0 before a crowd of 6,000 spectators.

=== Match results ===
Key

- In Result column, Nelson's score shown first
- A = Away match
- Q4 = Fourth Qualifying Round
- Q5 = Fifth Qualifying Round

Results

Round	Date	Opponents	Result	Goalscorers	Attendance
Q4	18 November 1922	Rochdale (A)	1–0	Eddleston	10,000
Q5	2 December 1922	Stalybridge Celtic (A)	0–1		6,000

== Player statistics ==
David Wilson used a total of 19 players during the 1922–23 season and there were nine different goalscorers. The team played in a 2–3–5 formation (the standard formation at the time) throughout the campaign, with two fullbacks, three halfbacks, two outside forwards, two inside forwards and a centre forward. Both Ernie Braidwood and Bob Hutchinson played in every league and cup game, while Nelson's record appearance holder Clement Rigg missed just one match, the defeat to Ashington on 7 October. The team scored a total of 62 goals in 40 competitive matches. With 22 league goals and 1 in the FA Cup, Joe Eddleston surpassed his 1921–22 total of 17 to become the team's top goalscorer for the second consecutive season. New signing Arthur Wolstenholme was the second highest scorer with 13 goals, while Braidwood notched the most goals of all the defenders with his total of six.

Key to positions

- CF = Centre forward
- FB = Fullback
- HB = Defender
- GK = Goalkeeper
- IF = Inside forward
- OF = Outside forward

Statistics

Nat.	Position	Player	Third Division North		FA Cup		Total
Nat.	Position	Player	Apps	Goals	Apps	Goals	Apps	Goals
(England)	GK	Harry Abbott	2	0	0	0	2	0
(England)	IF	William Bennett	1	0	0	0	1	0
(England)	GK	Joseph Birds	36	0	2	0	38	0
(Scotland)	OF	John Black	23	5	2	0	25	5
(England)	HB	Ernie Braidwood	38	6	2	0	40	6
(England)	HB	Jimmy Broadhead	36	1	2	0	38	1
(England)	IF	Dick Crawshaw	13	5	0	0	13	5
(England)	FB	Eddie Eastwood	2	0	0	0	2	0
(England)	CF	Joe Eddleston	34	22	2	1	36	23
(England)	OF	Sid Hoad	25	1	0	0	25	1
(England)	FB	Charles Howson	1	0	0	0	1	0
(England)	OF	Bob Hutchinson	38	1	2	0	40	1
(England)	FB	Bob Lilley	10	0	0	0	10	0
(Scotland)	IF	Mike McCulloch	28	6	2	0	30	6
(Scotland)	HB	James Price	4	0	0	0	4	0
(England)	FB	Clement Rigg	37	0	2	0	39	0
(Scotland)	FB	John Steel	24	0	2	0	26	0
(Scotland)	HB	David Wilson	30	0	2	0	32	0
(England)	IF	Arthur Wolstenholme	36	13	2	0	38	13

== See also ==
- List of Nelson F.C. seasons

== Notes ==
1. Despite announcing his retirement at the end of the 1921–22 season, Halligan later went on to play for Boston Town.
2. Until the 1925–26 season, match attendances in the Football League were not officially recorded.
