= List of people from Blackpool =

This is a list of people from Blackpool. Blackpool is a seaside town and unitary authority in Lancashire, in the North West England.

== Academia and research ==
- Valerie Austin (born 1948), hypnotherapist and writer
- Dame Janet "Jinty" Nelson (1941–2024), medieval historian

== Arts, literature and entertainment ==
- Bill Ashton (1936-2025), jazz saxophonist and composer
- David Atherton (born 1944), conductor
- David Ball (born 1959), music producer and musician
- Zoë Ball (born 1970), television and radio presenter
- Steve Barker (born 1971), film director and screenwriter
- Lennie Bennett (1938–2009), comedian and television presenter
- Stephen Booth (born 1952), crime writer
- Charlie Cairoli (1910–1980), Italian-born clown based in Blackpool
- Roy Calley, journalist
- Frank Carson (1926–2012), Northern Irish comedian based in Blackpool
- Jenna-Louise Coleman (born 1986), actress
- Robert Crampton (born 1964), journalist
- Lucy Fallon (born 1995), actress
- Karima Francis (born 1987), singer-songwriter
- Errol Fuller (born 1947), author and painter
- Tom Gregory (born 1995), singer
- Aiden Grimshaw (born 1991), singer
- Hamish Hamilton (born 1966), concert and award ceremony director
- Jeffrey Hammond (born 1946), musician
- Roy Harper (born 1941), musician
- Barney Harwood (born 1979), television presenter
- Emilios Hatjoullis (born 1939), cartoonist and graphic designer
- Tony Husband (1950–2023), cartoonist
- John Inman (1935–2007), actor known for Are You Being Served?
- Curtis Jobling (born 1972), illustrator and animator
- Patrick Keiller (born 1950), film director
- Jacqueline Leonard (born 1965), actress
- Little Boots (Victoria Hesketh, born 1984), singer-songwriter
- Syd Little (born 1942), comedian
- Chris Lowe (born 1959), musician
- John Mahoney (1940-2018), US actor (born in Bispham)
- Nicholas McCarthy (born 1974), musician
- Tania Mallet (born 1941), model and actress
- Keith Marsh (1926–2013), actor
- Gary Miller (1924–1968), singer and actor
- Pauline Moran, (born 1947), actress
- Rae Morris (born 1992), singer-songwriter
- David Morley (born 1964), poet
- Janet Munro (1934–1972), actress
- Sarah Myerscough, sculptor
- Graham Nash (1942), singer-songwriter
- Bernadette Nolan (1960–2013), Irish-born singer and actress
- Coleen Nolan (born 1965), singer and television presenter
- Craig Parkinson (born 1976), actor
- Russell Payne (born 1971), writer
- Joe-Warren Plant (born 2002), actor
- Jodie Prenger (born 1979), singer and actress
- Maddy Prior (born 1947), singer
- John Robb (born 1961), musician, TV presenter, author
- Ted Rhodes, (1934-2003), script editor
- Barbara Robotham (1936–2013), opera singer and distinguished voice teacher
- Jake Roche (born 1992), singer
- Carol Royle (born 1954), actress
- Nikki Sanderson (born 1984), actress and model
- Robert Smith (born 1959), musician
- Hayley Tamaddon, actress
- David Thewlis (born 1963), actor
- Nicola Thorp (born 1988), actress and broadcaster
- Ricky Tomlinson (born 1939), actor
- Vicki-Lee Walberg, (born 1975), model
- John Watson, comic book artist
- Chris Wiggins (1931-2017), actor
- Tony Williams (born 1947), musician
- Tim Woolcock (born 1952), painter
- Molly Wright (born 1996), actress

== Business ==
- Mike Bateson, former football club chairman
- William Lyons (1901–1985), co-founder of the Swallow Sidecar Company

== Military ==
- John Schofield (1892–1918), soldier and Victoria Cross recipient

== Politics, government and legal ==
- George Carman (1929–2001), barrister
- Neil Fletcher (born 1944), politician
- Tom McNally (born 1943), politician

== Science and health ==
- Sheila Quinn (1920-2016), nurse
- Michael Smith (1932–2000), biochemist

== Sports ==
- William Anderton (born 1879), footballer
- Jimmy Armfield (1935–2018), footballer
- Paul Askham (born 1962), figure skater
- Tom Barkhuizen (born 1993), footballer
- Malcolm Barrass (1924–2013), footballer
- Chris Beech (born 1974), footballer and coach
- Matthew Blinkhorn (born 1985), footballer
- Jamie Burns (born 1984), footballer
- Joe Bullock (rugby league), (born 1992), rugby player
- Paul Burgess (groundskeeper) (born 1978), groundskeeper
- Alan Burton (born 1991), footballer
- James Cahill (born 1995), snooker player
- Joe Cardle (born 1987), footballer
- Louis Cardwell (1912–1986), footballer
- Matthew Cassidy (born 1988), footballer
- Ronnie Clayton (1923–2007), boxer
- Harry Cookson (1869–1922), footballer
- Kenny Cooper, Sr. (born 1946), footballer and coach
- Billy Crellin (born 2000), footballer
- Steven Croft (born 1984), cricketer
- Ciaran Donnelly (born 1984), footballer
- Teddy Duckworth (born 1882), footballer
- Dave Durie (1931–2016), footballer
- George Eastham (1936–2024), footballer
- George Eastham, Sr. (1914–2000), footballer and manager
- Dave Edge (born 1954), British-Canadian Olympic long-distance runner
- Lester Ellis (born 1965), boxer
- Megan Finnigan (1998), footballer
- Andy Gouck (born 1972), footballer
- Peter Harding (1924–2007), rock climber
- Steve Harrison (born 1952), footballer, manager and coach
- Steve Hill (1940–2010), footballer
- John Hills (born 1978), footballer
- Micky Holmes (born 1965), footballer
- John Hurst (1947–2024), footballer
- Herbert Jones (1896–1973), footballer
- Matty Kay (born 1989), footballer
- Darran Kempson (born 1984), footballer
- Roger Kenyon (born 1949), footballer
- Graham Lancashire (born 1972), footballer
- Brian London (1934–2021), boxer originally from Hartlepool
- Andrew Lyons (born 1966), footballer
- Gavin McCann (born 1978), footballer
- Ben Marsden (born 1979), field hockey player
- Barrie-Jon Mather (born 1973), rugby player
- Darren Matthews (born 10 May 1968), Professional wrestler (Known as William Regal or Lord Steven Regal)
- Jamie Milligan (born 1980), footballer
- Kevin Moore (born 1956), footballer
- Lee Morris (born 1980), footballer
- Reginald Neal (born 1914), footballer
- Wes Newton (born 1977), darts player
- Michael Page (born 1941), cricketer
- Jack Parkinson (1869–1911), footballer
- Wilfred Proctor (1893-1980), footballer
- Jesse Pye (1919–1984), footballer
- Joe Riley (born 1996), footballer
- James Schofield (born 1978), cricketer
- Len Stephenson (1930–2014), footballer
- Frank Swift (1913–1958), footballer
- David Tong (born 1955), footballer
- Albert Turner (1901–1985), footballer
- Roger Uttley (born 1949), rugby player
- Ted Wade (born 1901), footballer
- Dennis Wann (born 1950), footballer
- Mark Westhead (born 1975), footballer
- Daniel Whiston (born 1976), ice skater
- Derek Woodman, motorcycle racer
- Shelly Woods (born 1986), wheelchair racer

== Miscellaneous ==
- Cynthia Lennon (1939-2015), first wife of musician John Lennon
- Louisa May Merrifield (1906–1953), poisoner
- Rachel McLean (1971–1991), murder victim
