= Willie Irvine =

Northern Irish footballer (1943–2025)

Personal information
- Full name: William John Irvine
- Date of birth: 18 June 1943
- Place of birth: Eden, Northern Ireland
- Date of death: 26 July 2025 (aged 82)
- Position: Centre forward

Senior career*
Years	Team	Apps	(Gls)
1960–1968	Burnley	126	(78)
1968–1971	Preston North End	81	(27)
1971	→ Brighton & Hove Albion (loan)	14	(6)
1971–1972	Brighton & Hove Albion	55	(21)
1972–1973	Halifax Town	10	(1)
1973–1974	Great Harwood	?	(?^{[A]})
Total		286+	(133+)

International career
1963–1965	Northern Ireland U23	3	(3)
1963–1972	Northern Ireland	23	(8)
- * Club domestic league appearances and goals

William John Irvine (18 June 1943 – 26 July 2025) was a Northern Irish professional footballer who played as a centre forward. Born in Eden, County Antrim, into a large family, he grew up in the nearby town of Carrickfergus. He did well at school, but chose to pursue a career in professional football and initially played for local club Linfield. After a spell in amateur football, Irvine travelled to England for a trial with Burnley at the age of 16. He was offered a professional deal and spent three years playing for the youth and reserve teams, before making his senior debut at the end of the 1962–63 season. Over the following seasons, Irvine became a regular feature of the Burnley team and in the 1965–66 campaign, he scored 29 goals and was the highest goalscorer in the Football League First Division.

Irvine lost his place in the Burnley team after suffering a broken leg during a cup tie in 1967, and never properly regained his form for the club. He was later transfer listed, and joined local rivals Preston North End in March 1968. In the Football League Second Division, he began to score goals again and was Preston's top goalscorer in the 1968–69 season despite suffering a serious leg injury which forced him to miss much of the campaign. When Alan Ball was named Preston manager in the summer of 1970, Irvine found himself out of the team. He joined Brighton & Hove Albion in July 1971 after impressing during a loan spell earlier in the year. He moved to Halifax Town midway through the 1972–73 season, but left the club after six months. Irvine ended his football career with a spell at semi-professional Great Harwood, before retiring at the age of 29.

In addition to playing club football, Irvine also represented the Northern Ireland national football team. He won 23 caps for his country, scoring eight goals. After retiring from football, he ran his own do-it-yourself shop but suffered from severe depression when the business collapsed. Irvine spent time in hospital after taking an overdose of medication, but recovered and later worked as a community worker before becoming a window cleaner. He later worked full-time in an aerospace factory, and also gave guided tours of Burnley's stadium, Turf Moor, on matchdays.

== Early life ==
William John Irvine was born on 18 June 1943 in the village of Eden, County Antrim, on the east coast of Northern Ireland. He was born to Alex and Agnes Irvine, and had 17 half-brothers and half-sisters from his mother's previous marriages. Irvine was 11 months old when his father, who had played football for Distillery, died after being involved in a motorcycle accident. He came from a poor background and when he was young the family resided in a small wooden bungalow that had neither electricity nor running water. His mother worked often, and Irvine was looked after by his elder siblings. At the age of one, he started to attend Eden School so that he could be looked after by the teachers while his sisters earned money. When he was seven years old, the family moved to the Sunnylands estate in nearby Carrickfergus after his mother was sent to Omagh Prison for falsely claiming benefits.

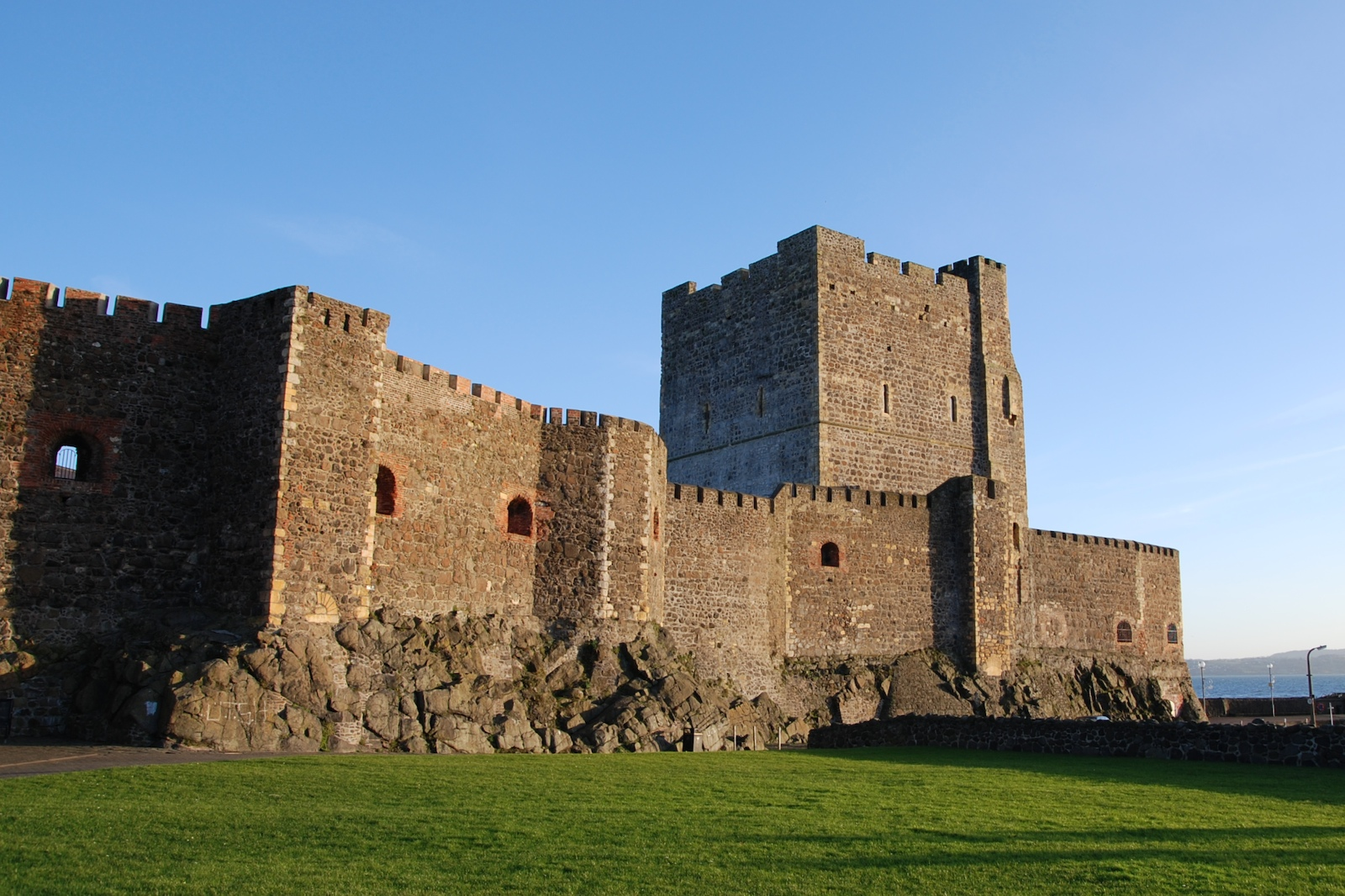
As a boy, Irvine often visited Carrickfergus Castle.

Irvine soon warmed to his new neighbourhood; he enjoyed visiting Carrickfergus Castle and often spent time at the harbour. In 1950, he moved to Sunnylands Primary School and began to play football seriously. He initially concentrated on playing as a goalkeeper for the school team. In 1953, the team reached the final of the County Cup, but were defeated 0–3 by an older side from Carrick Technical School. Irvine's elder brother Bobby, who went on to represent Stoke City and was also a Northern Ireland international, played for the opposition. Along with his schoolmate William Donnelly, Irvine often frequented Windsor Park to watch the Northern Ireland national team, and he idolised players such as Jimmy McIlroy and Danny Blanchflower.

At 14, Irvine enrolled at Carrick Technical School, where he studied German, physics, chemistry and woodwork. He excelled in his studies and was urged to go to university, but his family could not afford the fees. His interest in football increasing, he started to play in a midfielder position for the Carrickfergus-based Barn United and was selected to represent the East Antrim Schoolboys as well as the Irish Schools team. His performances while playing for Northern Ireland in the Victory Shield led to him signing junior terms with Belfast-based club Linfield, where his brother Bobby was the first-team goalkeeper. Several months later, Irvine left Linfield and joined local men's team Barn United, who competed in the Northern Ireland Amateur League. Several clubs, including Manchester United, Arsenal and Wolverhampton Wanderers showed an interest in him and in 1959, Jimmy McIlroy invited Irvine to a trial at English side Burnley.

== Club career ==
=== Burnley ===
Irvine joined the Burnley youth team initially on a month's trial, along with other young players including Brian O'Neil and Willie Morgan. He suffered an injury to his ankle but recovered in time for the final trial match against local rivals Blackburn Rovers. His performances during the month had sufficiently impressed manager Harry Potts, and Irvine was offered a permanent contract. He became a full member of the youth team and was an understudy to the team that won the Football League First Division in the 1959–60 season. As an apprentice footballer he earned a basic wage of £7 per week. While in the youth squad, Irvine was converted into a centre forward and in his first match in the position scored a hat-trick for the Burnley C team. He scored more than 40 goals for the A team in the Lancashire League during the 1961–62 season, including 6 in an 8–3 win against a Blackburn Rovers representative team. On 14 October 1961, Irvine made his debut for the Burnley reserve side, scoring a hat-trick in a 6–1 victory over Barnsley. Both the A team and the reserves were crowned champions of their respective divisions at the end of the season, and Potts singled out Irvine for particular praise, stating that Burnley had not "had a more consistent goal getter than Willie for a very long time."

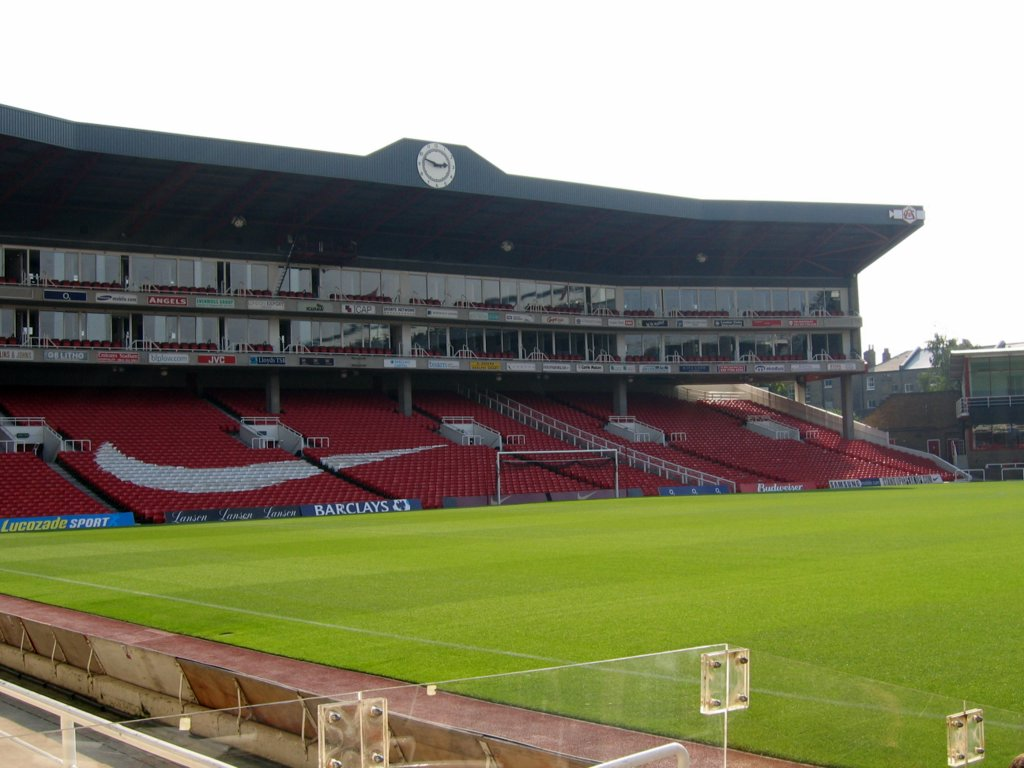
Highbury Stadium, where Irvine made his Football League debut in 1963

Going into the 1962–63 campaign, Irvine returned to the Burnley A team and scored a hat-trick against Bury early in the season. After Andy Lochhead was promoted to the first team in October 1962, Irvine became the reserve side's first-choice centre forward. He continued to score regularly, netting 8 goals in 15 appearances, although he was forced to stop playing for a period in the winter of 1963 when adverse weather caused the postponement of several matches. After his Northern Ireland debut in April that year, he made several more appearances for the reserves, and his goal against Blackpool was described by journalist Keith McNee as "the finest goal [he had] seen". On 11 May 1963, Irvine was asked by manager Potts to travel with the first team for their final away fixture of the season at Arsenal. He was a boot boy, and was originally only intended to assist Ray Bennion in transporting the team kit to and from the game. It was reported in the Burnley Express the day before the match that he would be making his professional debut against Arsenal, although Irvine himself only found out just before the match. He started at centre forward in place of Lochhead, who was unable to play because of a leg injury. Irvine had a successful introduction to senior football and scored a headed goal after 20 minutes of play, the first goal in a 3–2 win for Burnley. He was again selected three days later for the last game of the campaign at home to Birmingham City and scored a hat-trick as Burnley ended the season with a 3–1 victory.

Irvine started the first match of the 1963–64 campaign, a 3–1 defeat away to Ipswich Town. However, he suffered a broken hand during the game, which left him unable to play throughout the following months. Even after recovery, he remained sidelined, unable to regain his place in the starting eleven. Irvine did not play again for Burnley until 30 March 1964, when he was chosen to play at inside-right in the away tie against Bolton Wanderers. Despite Irvine's fifth goal in four league starts, Burnley were beaten 2–1. He retained his place in the team for the next two matches, before returning to his more preferred centre forward position for the 3–0 loss at home to Liverpool on 14 April 1964. He scored three more goals in the final two matches of the season, including two in a 7–2 win against Tottenham Hotspur. His frequent goalscoring led to him becoming a more integral part of the Burnley side during the following campaign, in which he scored three goals in the first six matches, although the team achieved only four draws and two losses. He was dropped from the starting line-up for the away match at Birmingham City on 12 September 1964. The team suffered three defeats in the following four fixtures, and Irvine was reinstated to the team for the trip to West Bromwich Albion two weeks later. He immediately marked his return with both Burnley goals in a 2–1 win, the team's first away victory of the season. Irvine retained his place in the side for most of the remainder of the campaign, and in December he scored seven goals in four games, including a hat-trick in a 4–0 win over Fulham. Despite missing a small portion of the campaign through injury, Irvine ended the season with a total of 22 goals in 37 league and cup matches, one more goal than centre forward partner Lochhead.

The Irvine–Lochhead partnership continued into the 1965–66 campaign. Irvine scored a goal in a 2–1 win against Lausanne Sports on a pre-season tour of Switzerland, and his first competitive goal of the season came on 24 August 1965 in a 3–1 home victory against Blackpool. He scored two in the return match at Bloomfield Road the following week, and two matches later he netted a hat-trick in a 4–1 defeat of Northampton Town. Between the 1–1 draw away at Leeds United on 30 October 1965 and the 5–2 win against Fulham on 11 December 1965, Irvine scored in seven consecutive league matches. In a 3–1 win against West Ham United, Irvine and Lochhead both scored in the same match for the first time, despite having played together for almost three seasons. Irvine took his goalscoring form into the cup competitions, netting five times in three FA Cup ties, and scoring the winning goals against Southampton and Stoke City as the team reached the fifth round of the EFL Cup before being knocked out by Peterborough United. During the second half of the season, he went through a somewhat barren spell, failing to score in the league between 8 January 1966 and 26 March 1966. He ended his poor run of form with a hat-trick in a 4–1 win over Nottingham Forest at Turf Moor. He subsequently got on the scoresheet in the next six league games, including two goals against Sheffield Wednesday which took him to 27 league goals, the joint-highest total since George Beel's 30 in the 1928–29 season. Irvine's 29th and final goal of the season came on 23 April 1966 in a 2–0 home victory against Liverpool. He was the highest scorer in the Football League First Division that season, the first, and to date only, time a Burnley player had achieved the feat.

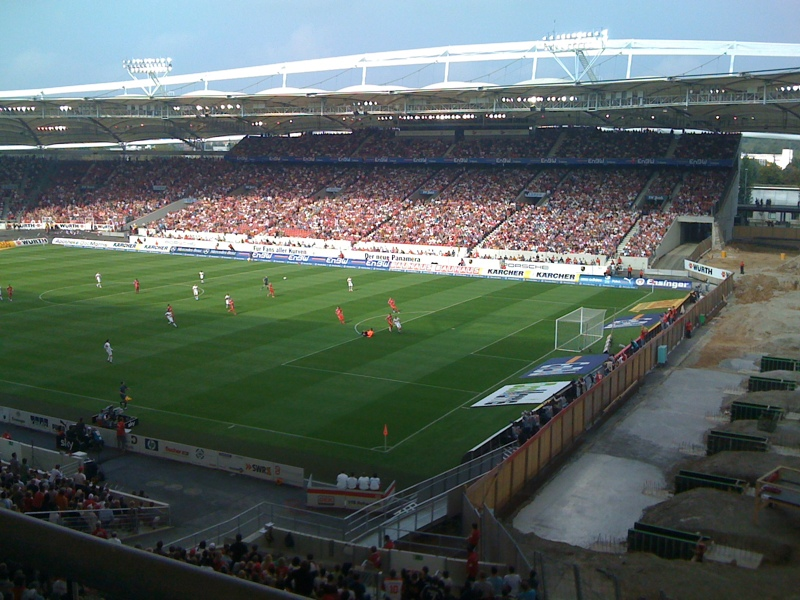
Irvine scored his first goal in European football at Stuttgart's Neckarstadion on 20 September 1966.

In June 1966, Irvine had an altercation with Burnley chairman Bob Lord after returning late from a Northern Ireland match. Nevertheless, he retained his place in the starting line-up at the start of the 1966–67 campaign, and scored in the first match of the season against Sheffield United. After a pre-season tour of Austria, throughout which Burnley remained undefeated, the team were confident of a successful season and especially looked forward to European competition in the Inter-Cities Fairs Cup. On 20 September 1966, Irvine scored the sole Burnley goal in a 1–1 draw against German side VfB Stuttgart. The following month, he scored in consecutive league matches against Leicester City and Manchester City at Turf Moor. Irvine was on the scoresheet again in the next round of the Fairs Cup as Swiss team Lausanne Sports were beaten 5–0 in Burnley on 25 October 1966. By the middle of the season, Irvine had scored 13 goals in the league, four fewer than the same stage of the previous campaign. He scored his first goal of the new year on 31 January 1967 in the FA Cup third round replay against Everton at Goodison Park. However, early in the second half, Irvine was tackled by Everton defender Johnny Morrissey. The challenge—not deemed a foul by the referee—broke his shin bone, and Irvine was immediately substituted and replaced by fellow Irishman Sammy Todd. The injury meant that he did not play again for Burnley for the remainder of the season. He was forced to remain on the sidelines as Burnley finished 14th in the First Division and reached the fourth round of the Fairs Cup before being knocked out by Eintracht Frankfurt.

Irvine regained his place in the Burnley team at the start of the 1967–68 campaign, and scored in the first two league matches of the season. However, he was dropped from the starting eleven after four games. On 7 October 1967, in a 1–1 draw with Nottingham Forest, he became the first ever Burnley player to score after coming on as a substitute, after replacing Martin Dobson. Irvine made six consecutive starts throughout October and November 1967, before again being dropped following the 2–0 home win against Newcastle United. After this, he played less often and scored his final goal for the club on 5 December 1967 in a 2–1 defeat to Arsenal in the fifth round of the League Cup. Just over two months later, on 24 February 1968, Irvine made his last appearance for Burnley when he played in an unfamiliar inside-right position in a 1–0 loss away at Nottingham Forest. In the same month, he formally requested to be placed on the transfer list after becoming increasingly unhappy at Burnley. The request was granted by Potts, who set a price of £60,000 for Irvine. Altogether, he had scored 97 goals in a total of 148 first-team matches for Burnley during his eight years with the club.

=== Preston North End ===
In March 1968, Irvine signed for Preston North End, who were struggling at the bottom of the Football League Second Division, for a transfer fee of £45,000 and a signing-on fee of £5,000. He was one of five Burnley first-team players to leave the club during that year. Irvine made his debut for Preston North End on 14 March 1968 in a 4–0 defeat away at Ipswich Town. He scored his first goal for the club in the following match, a 2–1 win against Aston Villa at Deepdale. The team subsequently went on a run of eight games without defeat in the league, including a 3–1 win over Huddersfield Town in which Irvine scored a hat-trick. On the morning of 27 April 1968, the Preston North End team were each offered £2,500 to purposely lose the match against Bristol City so that Bristol City could improve their chances of avoiding relegation. Irvine, along with teammate Derek Temple, refused, saying: "I'm a professional. I want no part of this". Irvine scored the team's only goal in a 4–1 defeat that day, and by the end of the 1967–68 season he had scored six times in eleven matches for his new side. He carried his goalscoring form into the new campaign, scoring the winner against Oldham Athletic in the first round of the League Cup, and netting a consolation goal in a 3–1 defeat to Crystal Palace.

After 16 matches of the 1968–69 season, Irvine had scored 13 goals. However, he suffered a knee injury midway through the season in the FA Cup fourth round tie against Chelsea. He was injured ten minutes into the match but played for most of the first half before being substituted. He had a chipped bone and ligament damage, requiring him to undergo an operation in February 1969 that forced him to miss the rest of the campaign. Despite missing many games, he was Preston's top scorer that season with 20 goals in all competitions. Irvine never fully recovered from the injury, and played only 16 games the following season, scoring five goals. Preston North End were relegated to the Football League Third Division in 1970 after finishing bottom of the league. Manager Bobby Seith was dismissed following the relegation, and replaced by former Halifax Town coach Alan Ball in May 1970. Ball was reluctant to play Irvine after discovering the knee injury from the previous season. Nevertheless, he appeared in the first three matches of the 1970–71 campaign, scoring in a 1–0 win against Stockport County in the first round of the League Cup. He was dropped from the team after missing several chances in a 3–1 defeat to Torquay United on 22 August 1970. After this, Irvine did not feature regularly for Preston North End and from October 1970, he played mostly for the reserve team. He made his final senior appearance for the club on 26 December 1970 in a 3–3 draw with Tranmere Rovers at Deepdale. During a three-year spell, he played 81 league games for Preston North End, scoring 27 goals in the process.

=== Later career ===
In March 1971, Ball offered Irvine the opportunity of a three-month loan spell at fellow Third Division side Brighton & Hove Albion. Irvine made his debut for Brighton on 10 March 1971 in a 3–2 win against Fulham. He scored in the match, and manager Pat Saward was effusive in his praise of his new signing. Irvine became a regular starter for Brighton, and scored again in a 1–1 draw with Plymouth Argyle at the Goldstone Ground on 28 April 1971. During the loan spell, he played 14 league games and scored six goals. At the end of the season, Irvine temporarily returned to Preston but a transfer fee of £7,000 took him to Brighton on a permanent deal in July 1971. Irvine became known as "late-goal Willie" after scoring a succession of last-minute goals. On 11 December 1971, he scored against Walsall in the second round of the FA Cup to take the tie to a replay. He scored the equaliser in a 2–2 draw away at Bristol Rovers on 22 January 1972, followed by a late winner in a 2–1 defeat of Wrexham two weeks later.

Irvine added to his tally with home and away goals against Halifax Town, where he would go on to play the next season, and a strike against Aston Villa that was named as runner-up in a Goal of the Season competition by television programme Match of the Day. With the forward partnership of Irvine and Kit Napier, Brighton performed better than expected in the 1971–72 season. At the end of the campaign, following a 1–1 draw with Rochdale the team was promoted to the Second Division, after finishing as runners-up behind Aston Villa. Irvine continued to score in a higher division, netting five times in the first eleven matches of the season. However, he was then dropped from the team and never regained his place in the starting line-up. Several clubs became interested in his services, including West Ham United, a number of American teams, and Scottish side Heart of Midlothian, where Bobby Seith was the manager. Irvine played his last match for Brighton on 18 November 1972, when the team lost 1–0 at home to his former club Burnley.

After turning down potential transfers to West Ham and Torquay, because neither he nor his wife wanted to live in either place, Irvine decided to sign for Third Division outfit Halifax Town in December 1972. Despite taking a considerable pay cut, he chose Halifax to enable his family to return to live near Burnley. Irvine made a total of 11 first-team appearances for Halifax Town, scoring one goal for the club. He played his last competitive game for the club in a 1–0 win against York City on 13 March 1973, after manager George Mulhall accused Irvine of not trying and not deserving his wage. At the end of the 1972–73 season, the team avoided relegation to the Fourth Division on goal difference. After failing to report for the away game at Walsall on 1 May 1973, to play in a testimonial match for Burnley defender John Angus, he was fined two weeks' wages and forced into extra training sessions. In the summer of 1973, Irvine left Halifax Town by mutual consent, his professional football career over at the age of 29. Despite having the option to sign for Rochdale, he joined semi-professional side Great Harwood, who played in the Northern Premier League. At Great Harwood, he played alongside two former Burnley teammates; goalkeeper Adam Blacklaw and midfielder Les Latcham. Irvine remained at the club for a number of months, before leaving midway through the 1973–74 season and retiring from football altogether.

== International career ==
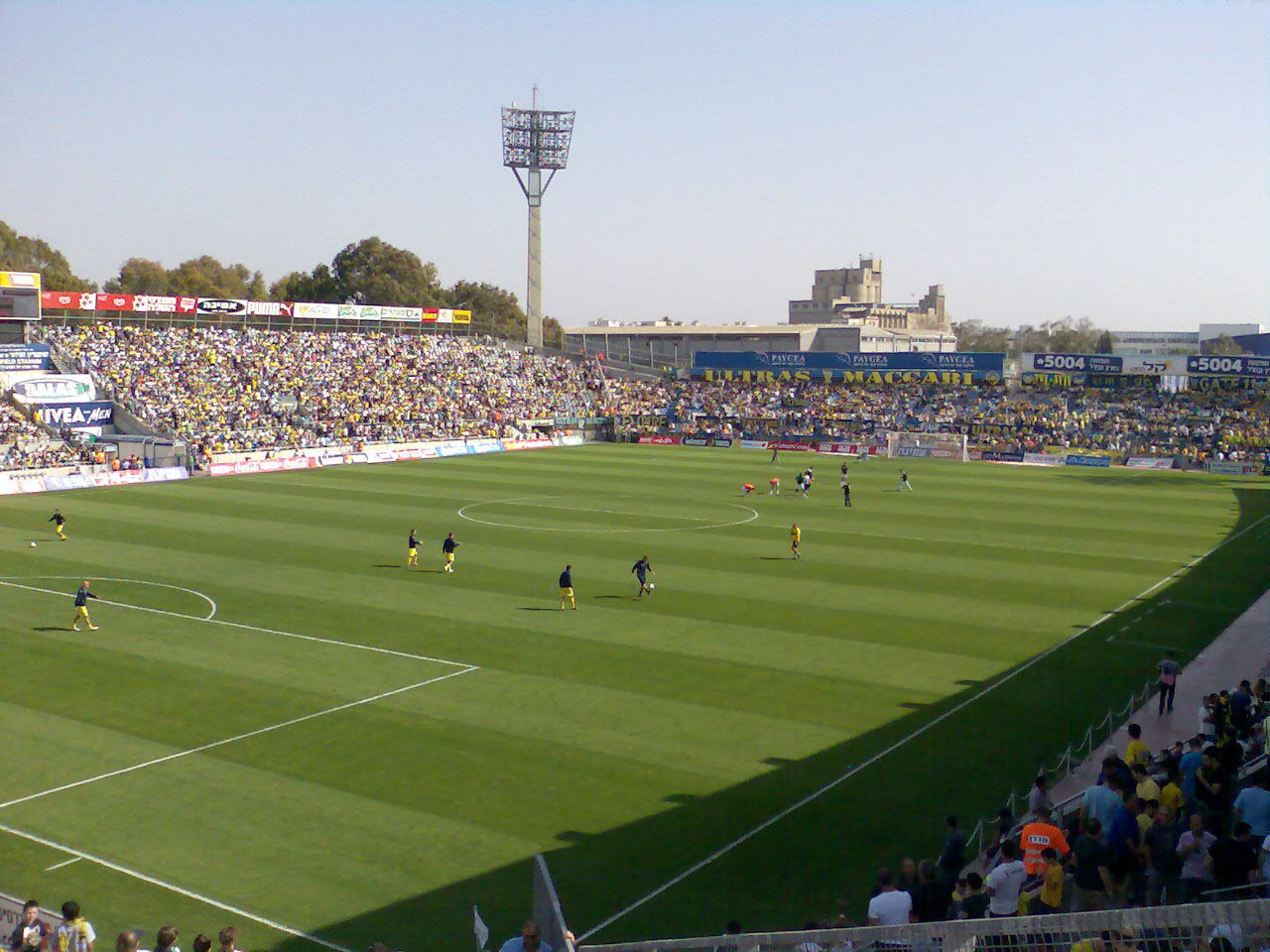
Irvine scored his final two international goals in the Bloomfield Stadium in Tel Aviv, Israel.

Irvine's first taste of international football came in 1958, when he represented the Northern Ireland schoolboy team in the Victory Shield. Five years later, he made his debut for the Northern Ireland national under-23 football team, when he played alongside his brother Bobby in a 5–1 defeat to Wales on 27 February 1963. During the next two years, he played twice more for the under-23 team, scoring three goals for the side. Irvine received his first call-up to the Northern Ireland senior team in April 1963, one month before he made his professional debut for Burnley. He went straight into the team and won his first cap on 3 April 1963 in a 4–1 loss to Wales in the British Home Championship. He received his next cap the following month and scored his first international goal on 30 May 1963 in the 1–1 draw with Spain in the first round of the 1964 European Nations Cup. It was over a year before Irvine was selected to represent his country again, when he was included in the squad for a 2–1 defeat to Switzerland in a qualification match for the 1966 FIFA World Cup. On 25 November 1964, he scored his second Northern Ireland goal in the loss to Scotland in the British Home Championship. Irvine was involved in his first win with the Northern Ireland team when they defeated the Netherlands in a World Cup qualifying game on 17 March 1965. During the remainder of the 1964–65 season, he won a further three caps for his country.

Between 2 October 1965 and 30 March 1966, Irvine scored in four consecutive international fixtures. The run started with a goal against Scotland in the British Home Championship, followed by a goal in a 2–1 loss to England on 10 November 1965. Two weeks later, he netted in a World Cup qualifier against Albania before scoring in a 4–1 win against Wales to complete the run. Irvine continued to play for Northern Ireland, winning caps against Mexico, England and Scotland, but it was almost two and a half years before he scored again in international football. His two goals in a friendly match against Israel were his last for Northern Ireland, although he did win another five caps for his country. After leaving Burnley in 1968, his inclusion in the Northern Ireland squad became less frequent and between 1969 and 1972 he did not make an appearance for the team. After three years out of the side, he returned for a 2–0 loss to Scotland on 20 May 1972. He played against England three days later before winning his 23rd and final cap in the goal-less draw with Wales, the team against which he had made his international debut, on 27 May 1972.

== Style of play ==
As a youngster, Irvine played as a goalkeeper until his elder brother Bobby, who went on to keep goal for the Northern Ireland national team, threatened to "batter" him. He subsequently moved into a midfield position, before becoming a centre forward during his time in the Burnley youth team. Described as a natural and instinctive goalscorer, Irvine stated that one of his main strengths as a striker was the ability to anticipate where the ball was going to land.

== Outside football ==
Irvine was married to wife Rita, whom he met in a public house in Burnley. The couple were wed on 3 October 1966, and had three sons; Darren, Stephen and Jonathan, who played semi-professional football for Nelson and Colne. He lived in the village of Worsthorne after retiring from football in 1974. Following his retirement he rented a warehouse from a friend and started a do-it-yourself retail business in the centre of Burnley. The shop was reasonably successful, and Irvine opened a second branch in Keighley, West Yorkshire. However, the business became untenable after several years and left Irvine owing £44,000 to the bank after a potential buyer for the shop pulled out of the deal. Following the collapse of the business, Irvine suffered severe depression and at one stage attempted suicide by taking an overdose of paracetamol tablets. He was discovered in time by his wife and admitted to Burnley General Hospital, where he underwent an emergency procedure to pump his stomach. After the attempt, he got a part-time job with Burnley Borough Council, working with young people at local community centres. He later worked as a window cleaner for 12 months before selling the round for a profit. Irvine then took a job in an engineering factory, where he worked for 14 years, before joining electrical firm LED. From there, he moved to Aeropia, an aircraft parts manufacturer, where he worked as a stores manager. On matchdays at Turf Moor, he gave guided tours of the ground to supporters.

=== Death ===
Irvine died on 26 July 2025 after a long illness. He was 82.

== Notes ==
A. The Northern Premier League is a semi-professional league; individual players' appearances and goals are not available in either contemporary or modern sources.
