= John Bennie =

John Bennie may refer to:

- John Bennie (footballer) (1896–after 1921), Scottish footballer
- John Bennie (missionary) (1796–1869), Presbyterian missionary and Xhosa linguist
