= Harry Clayton (footballer) =

English footballer

Personal information
- Date of birth: 1904
- Place of birth: Nelson, England
- Height: 5 ft 11 in (1.80 m)
- Position: Defender

Youth career
- 1922–1924: Stoke

Senior career*
Years	Team	Apps	(Gls)
1924	Chorley		
1924–1926	Nelson	4	(0)
1926–1929	Morecambe		
1929–1931	Manchester Central	?	(?)
	Bacup Borough	?	(?)
- * Club domestic league appearances and goals

Harry Clayton (born 1904, date of death unknown) was an English professional footballer who played in several defensive positions. Born in Nelson, Lancashire, he played four matches in the Football League for Nelson in the 1925–26 season.

== Playing career ==
As a junior, Clayton played for Hebden Bridge, before joining the "A" team at Stoke in 1922. He never progressed to the first team, and signed for Lancashire Combination club Chorley in April 1924. The following month, Clayton joined his hometown team Nelson, who played in the Football League Third Division North. Throughout the 1924–25 season, he played solely in the reserve team at Nelson. The following campaign, he again featured often in the reserves, helping them to the Lancashire Combination title in 1926. He made his professional debut on 23 January 1926, deputising for Clement Rigg in the left-back position in the 1–2 defeat away at Southport. Clayton made three further appearances in the league in the 1925–26 season, two at right half-back and one at left half-back. His last senior game for Nelson was the 4–0 home win against Durham City on 27 February 1926.

In the summer of 1926, Clayton returned to the Lancashire Combination with Morecambe, where he played alongside fellow former Nelson defender Eddie Eastwood. He played 45 league and cup matches in his first season with Morecambe, as the team finished third in the division and won the Combination Cup and the Lancashire Junior Cup. Two more seasons with Morecambe followed, before a transfer to Manchester Central in June 1929. In early 1931, Clayton had a short spell with Central FC (Belle Vue), and later played for Bacup Borough. He subsequently returned to his hometown and represented several factory teams, including James Clark Ltd. and Lustrafil, during the remainder of the 1930s.
