= Latcham =

Latcham is a surname. Notable people with the surname include:

- Jeremy Latcham, American film producer
- Les Latcham (born 1942), English footballer
- Ricardo E. Latcham (1869–1943), Chilean archaeologist
