= Charles Howson =

English footballer

Personal information
- Date of birth: 18 July 1896
- Place of birth: Wombwell, England
- Date of death: 1976 (aged 79–80)
- Place of death: Wombwell, England
- Height: 5 ft 11 in (1.80 m)
- Position: Defender

Senior career*
| Years | Team | Apps | (Gls) |
| 1919–1920 | Rotherham Town | | |
| 1920–1922 | Wombwell | | |
| 1922 | Nelson | 1 | (0) |
| 1922–1923 | Mansfield Town | | |
- * Club domestic league appearances and goals

Charles Howson (18 July 1896 – 1976) was an English professional footballer who played as a defender. Born in Wombwell, he started his career with Rotherham Town in 1919, before joining his hometown club a year later. Numerous Football League clubs enquired to Wombwell with interest in acquiring the services of Howson, and in the summer of 1922 he joined Football League Third Division North club Nelson. After initially playing in the reserves, he was called up to the first-team for the home match against Ashington on 7 October 1922 due to an injury to Clement Rigg. Nelson lost the match 1–3 and the Nelson Leader described his performance as disappointing. He did not appear for Nelson again after that match, and left the club in November 1922 to join Port Vale on trial. His trial was unsuccessful and he moved to Mansfield Town on a permanent deal the following month. He played for Mansfield until the end of the 1922–23 season, when he left the club and retired from professional football.
