= Harry Hargreaves (footballer) =

English footballer

Personal information
- Full name: Harold Hargreaves
- Date of birth: 15 March 1896
- Place of birth: Higham, Lancashire, England
- Date of death: 1975 (aged 78–79)
- Position: Inside left

Senior career*
Years	Team	Apps	(Gls)
1914–1915	Great Harwood	?	(?)
1919–1921	Nelson	13	(2)
1921–1922	Wolverhampton Wanderers	53	(8)
1923	Pontypridd	?	(?)
1923–1926	Tottenham Hotspur	35	(7)
1926–1928	Burnley	26	(6)
1928–1930	Rotherham United	?	(?)
1933	Rossendale United	8	(4)
1931–1936	Barnoldswick Town	?	(?)
1936–?	Nelson Town	?	(?)
- * Club domestic league appearances and goals

Harold "Harry" Hargreaves (15 March 1896 – 1975) was a professional footballer who played for Great Harwood, East Lancashire Regiment, Nelson, Wolverhampton Wanderers, Pontypridd, Tottenham Hotspur, Burnley, Rossendale United and Barnoldswick Town. Outside of football, he was also a keen cricketer and bowls player.

== Early life ==
Hargreaves was born in Higham, Lancashire. From a young age, he was known by the nickname "Pey". During the First World War, he served with the East Lancashire Regiment, reaching the rank of sergeant. He was wounded in action and detained as a prisoner of war for 18 months. While in the army, Hargreaves also represented the regiment football team.

== Football career ==
Hargreaves played for Great Harwood and Nelson before signing for Wolverhampton Wanderers. The inside left made 53 appearances and scored eight goals between 1921 and 1922 at Molineaux. After a spell at Pontypridd, Hargreaves joined Tottenham Hotspur where he featured in 35 matches and netting seven goals. He left White Hart Lane to join Burnley where he went on to make a further 26 appearances and scored six times. After a spell with Rotherham United, Hargreaves played for Rossendale United and Barnoldswick Town in the Lancashire Combination, before ending his career with Nelson Town.

== After football ==
After retiring from football, Hargreaves concentrated on other sports and played cricket for the Railway Street Wesleyans in the Padiham League. In one season, he set the record for best batting and bowling averages and won a prize for the best fielding in the league. He later concentrated on bowls and won several awards in local leagues and competitions around the Burnley area. After the Second World War, he became a director of the reformed Nelson F.C. and established a fish and chip shop near Turf Moor.
