= William Bennett (footballer) =

English footballer

Personal information
- Full name: William Bennett
- Place of birth: Leyland, England
- Height: 5 ft 10 1/2 in (1.79 m)
- Position: Inside forward

Senior career*
Years	Team	Apps	(Gls)
1921–1922	Sheffield United	0	(0)
1922	Leyland Motors	?	(?)
1922	Chorley	?	(?)
1922–1923	Nelson	1	(0)
1923–1924	Leyland Motors	?	(?)
1924–1925	Lytham	?	(?)
- * Club domestic league appearances and goals

William Bennett was an English professional footballer who played as an inside forward. Born in Leyland, Lancashire, he was spotted by Football League First Division side Sheffield United while playing non-league football with Leyland Motors. He moved to Sheffield in February 1921, but was released in January 1922 after failing to make a first-team appearance.

Bennett subsequently rejoined Leyland Motors, but his stay was short-lived as he joined Chorley in March 1922. At the end of the season, he was signed by Football League Third Division North outfit Nelson. He initially played in the reserve team, but was called up to the first-team for the match against Rochdale on 25 November 1922 due to an injury to regular inside forward Arthur Wolstenholme. Bennett did not make an impact on the match as Nelson fell to a 1–2 defeat, and he returned to the reserves for the remainder of the campaign.

In March 1923, he again re-signed for Leyland Motors where he stayed until September 1924, when he joined Lytham. He left the club in 1925 and retired from football.
