= Thomas Jacques (footballer) =

English footballer

Personal information
- Full name: Thomas Edgar Jacques
- Date of birth: 13 November 1890
- Place of birth: Skipton, England
- Date of death: October quarter 1968
- Place of death: Nelson, England
- Height: 5 ft 10 1/2 in (1.79 m)
- Position: Half-back

Senior career*
Years	Team	Apps	(Gls)
	Accrington Stanley	?	(?)
	Darwen	?	(?)
1911–1912	Blackburn Trinity	?	(?)
1912–1915	Blackburn Rovers	2	(0)
1919–1922	Nelson	17	(1)
1922–1923	Great Harwood	?	(?)
1923–1924	Barnoldswick Park Villa	?	(?)
1924	Earby	?	(?)
- * Club domestic league appearances and goals

Thomas Edgar Jacques (13 November 1890 – 1968) was an English professional footballer who played as a half-back. He started his career in non-League football with Accrington Stanley and Darwen, before moving into the professional game with Blackburn Rovers in March 1912. Jacques made two League appearances for Blackburn but left the club in 1915 to join the British Army. He served in the First World War, during which he was captured and taken as a prisoner of war.

Upon the conclusion of the conflict, he joined Nelson in July 1919. Two seasons later, the club was accepted into the Football League and Jacques played 17 matches in the Third Division North. He scored the only goal of his League career in the 4–1 win against Wigan Borough on 3 September 1921. Jacques lost his place in the side following the arrival of James Price and he left Nelson in 1922. He subsequently returned to non-League football, where he had spells with Great Harwood, Barnoldswick Park Villa and finally Earby.
