= Duggie Humphrey =

English footballer (1897–1965)

Personal information
- Full name: Douglas Vincent Humphrey
- Date of birth: 27 September 1897
- Place of birth: Ecclesall, Sheffield, England
- Date of death: 8 June 1965 (aged 67)
- Place of death: Sheffield, England
- Height: 5 ft 6 in (1.68 m)
- Position: Outside left

Senior career*
Years	Team	Apps	(Gls)
1920–1922	Bradford Park Avenue	7	(1)
1922–1924	Stockport County	29	(2)
1924–1926	Nelson	8	(0)
1926–19xx	Selby Town	?	(?)
- * Club domestic league appearances and goals

Douglas Vincent "Duggie" Humphrey (27 September 1897 – 8 June 1965) was an English professional footballer who played as an outside-left. Hailing from Sheffield, he started his senior career with Bradford Park Avenue in November 1920. He played seven league matches and scored one goal for the club before transferring to Football League Second Division side Stockport County in the summer of 1922. Humphrey went on to score twice in 29 appearances for Stockport. His goals, both against Derby County, helped the team to avoid relegation at the end of the 1922–23 campaign.

In January 1924, Humphrey moved to fellow Second Division club Nelson in exchange for Bob Hutchinson. He made his Nelson debut on 2 February 1924 in the 0–2 defeat to South Shields at Seedhill. Humphrey played in seven more league matches during the remainder of the 1923–24 season, including the 1–0 win against Manchester United at Old Trafford on 8 March 1924, but he could not prevent the team from suffering relegation to the Third Division North. He remained with Nelson for a further two years but did not make another first-team appearance for the club.

Humphrey left Nelson in November 1926 and subsequently moved into non-League football with Selby Town. After his football career ended, he returned to Sheffield and died in the city on 8 June 1965, at the age of 67.
