= Bob Hutchinson (footballer) =

English footballer (1894-1971)

Personal information
- Full name: Robert Hutchinson
- Date of birth: 22 December 1894
- Place of birth: Blyth, England
- Date of death: 3 August 1971 (aged 76)
- Place of death: Gosforth, England
- Position: Outside forward

Senior career*
Years	Team	Apps	(Gls)
1914–1919	St Mirren	2	(0)
1919–1920	Newcastle United	0	(0)
1920–1922	Ashington	23	(4)
1922–1924	Nelson	60	(1)
1924	Stockport County	4	(1)
1924–1925	Chesterfield	13	(1)
1925–1926	Barrow	37	(4)
1926	New Bedford Whalers	10	(0)
1926	Springfield Babes	2	(0)
1927	Fall River	5	(2)
1927	Newark Skeeters	2	(0)
1927	Hartford Americans	11	(0)
1928	Darlington	3	(0)
1928–1930	West Stanley	?	(?)
- * Club domestic league appearances and goals

Robert Hutchinson (22 December 1894 – 3 August 1971) was an English professional footballer who played as an outside forward. Born in Blyth, Northumberland, he started his career in local football, before moving to Scottish club St Mirren in 1914. He went on to play for a number of Football League clubs and for two seasons, Hutchinson had a spell in the United States. He played for 14 different teams during the course of his 16-year career, earning the moniker "nomadic" footballer.

== Career ==
Hutchinson started his career in amateur football with Palmer's (Jarrow) and Gosforth, before moving to Scottish Football League side St Mirren at the start of the 1914–15 season. During the First World War, he served in the Army and had a spell as a wartime guest with Ashington from January 1915. He later returned to St Mirren and played there until January 1919, when he joined Football League First Division club Newcastle United as an amateur. He was given a professional contract in May of the same year, but failed to break into the first team and left at the end of the 1919–20 campaign without having made a senior appearance.

Hutchinson rejoined Football League Third Division North outfit Ashington on a permanent deal in the summer of 1920. He played there for one season, scoring four goals in 23 league matches. In May 1922, he signed for fellow Third Division North side Nelson on a free transfer. Hutchinson made his Nelson debut on 26 August 1922 in the 2–6 defeat away at Bradford Park Avenue. He became first-choice left-winger at the club, and scored his first goal for the side in the 4–0 victory over Durham City at Seedhill on 10 February 1923. Hutchinson played every league game in the 1922–23 season as Nelson won the league, achieving promotion to the Football League Second Division for the first time in their history. He kept his place in the side and his final league match for Nelson was the 0–1 defeat to Oldham Athletic on 26 January 1924. Later in the month, his stay with Nelson ended as he moved to Stockport County in a swap for Duggie Humphrey.

His spell at Stockport was brief, as he played only four league games, scoring one goal. In the summer of 1924, Hutchinson returned to the Third Division North when he joined Chesterfield on a free transfer. After one goal in 13 matches, taking him to exactly 100 league appearances, he again switched clubs at the end of the campaign, signing for Barrow in July 1925. At Holker Street, Hutchinson became a first-team regular for the first time since leaving Nelson, scoring four goals in 37 games as the side finished bottom of the Third Division North.

Hutchinson emigrated to the United States in 1926, initially playing with the New Bedford Whalers before joining the Springfield Babes later in the season. For the 1927 campaign, he played for the Fall River before transferring to the Newark Skeeters. He went on to assist the Hartford Americans later in 1927, playing 11 league games. He returned to England early the following year, and joined Third Division North team Darlington in March 1928. Hutchinson played three league matches and then moved into non-league football with West Stanley at the end of the season. After two years with the club, he became an amateur for Gosforth & Coxledge in September 1930, before retiring from football completely. Hutchinson died in Gosforth in the autumn of 1971, at the age of 76.

== Honours ==
Nelson

- Football League Third Division North: 1922–23
