= Ronnie Clayton (footballer, born 1934) =

English footballer (1934–2010)

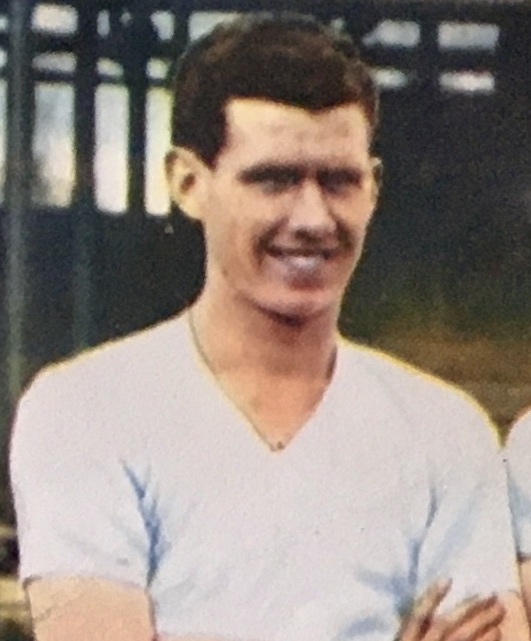
- Clayton in 1959

Personal information
- Full name: Ronald Clayton
- Date of birth: 5 August 1934
- Place of birth: Preston, England
- Date of death: 29 October 2010 (aged 76)
- Height: 5 ft 9 1/2 in (1.77 m)
- Position: Right-half

Youth career
- Blackburn Rovers

Senior career*
Years	Team	Apps	(Gls)
1950–1969	Blackburn Rovers	581	(15)
1969–1970	Morecambe		
1970–1971	Great Harwood		

International career
1955–1957	England U23	6	(0)
1955	England B	1	(0)
1955–1960	England	35	(0)

Managerial career
- 1969–1970: Morecambe (player-manager)
- * Club domestic league appearances and goals

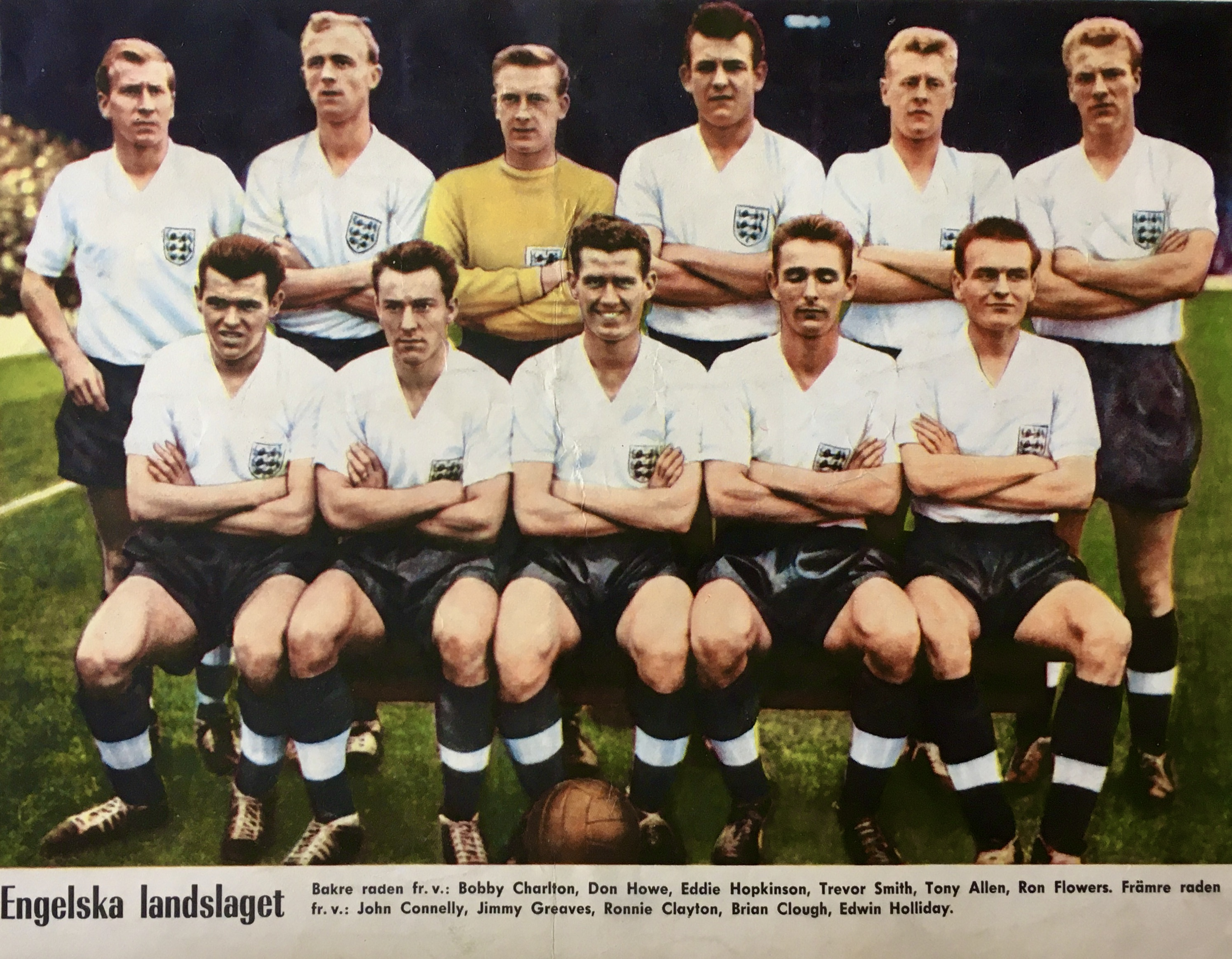
Clayton – front row centre – in a England national football team photo before playing against Sweden men's national football team, October 1959.

Ronald Clayton (5 August 1934 – 29 October 2010) was an English footballer who made nearly 600 appearances in the Football League playing for Blackburn Rovers. He was capped 35 times for England between 1955 and 1960.

Clayton, a right half, began his career with Blackburn Rovers (where his elder brother Ken was also a squad member). He made his first-team debut as a 16-year-old in the 1950–51 season, and between then and 1969 made 581 appearances for his only Football League club. He then became player-manager of Morecambe, and also appeared for Great Harwood before retiring.

At international level, Clayton was capped six times for England under-23, once for England B, and 35 times at full international level, including five as captain. He made his international debut against Northern Ireland in November 1955, and won his last cap against Yugoslavia in May 1960. He was part of England's team at the 1958 FIFA World Cup.

In 1960 his autobiography 'A Slave – To Soccer' was published. On 2 December 1970 Blackburn Rovers recognised his services to the club with them hosting the Ronnie Clayton Testimonial Match with a Manchester City / Liverpool XI playing an International XI.

Clayton died in October 2010. On 13 August 2011, as a sign of respect to Clayton, it was announced at half-time during the first game of the 2011–12 Premier League season, that The Blackburn End was to be renamed The Ronnie Clayton End at Ewood Park. In February 2019 he was one of the first seven players to be inducted into the club's Hall of Fame.

== Honours ==
Blackburn Rovers

- FA Cup runner-up: 1959–60

== See also ==
- List of England national football team captains
- List of English association football families
- List of footballers in England by number of league appearances (500+)
- List of one-club men in association football
