= Portsmouth Rovers F.C. =

English football club

Portsmouth Rovers
- Full name: Portsmouth Rovers Football Club
- Founded: 1907
- Dissolved: 1928
- Ground: Rattenclough
colours

Portsmouth Rovers F.C. was an English association football club based in the village of Portsmouth, which was then in Lancashire.

== History ==
There are references to a Portsmouth Rovers as early as 1887, although this particular club's first competitive football came in the 1907–08 season. The club gained early notoriety in 1908 when captain Tom Sugden got drunk. broke into a chicken coop, strangled 21 fowl, and was found unconscious at home, with one cooking in a pot; being of good character, he was bound over for 12 months.

The team spent four years in the second division of the Lancashire Combination between 1911 and 1915, but consistently finished near the foot of the table. Portsmouth Rovers also entered the FA Cup, the foremost cup competition in England, on several occasions and reached the first qualifying round twice. For seven consecutive seasons from 1919–20 to 1925–26, they were knocked out in the preliminary round. Portsmouth Rovers participated in the Cup for the final time on 4 September 1926, but lost to Walsden United in the extra preliminary round by a single goal.

The last record of the club is its entry to the Lancashire Junior Cup in the 1928–29 season, but the club had disbanded before its tie with Walsden United could take place.

Several notable footballers began their careers with Portsmouth Rovers; goalkeeper Jerry Dawson went on to become an England international, while local full-back Clem Rigg played over 250 professional matches for Nelson.

== Colours ==
The club wore blue and white striped shirts originally with white shorts, which changed to black in the 1910s, and black and socks.

== Ground ==
The club played at Rattenclough, to the west of the village, either on or close to the cricket ground.

== FA Cup results ==
Season	Round	Opponent	Date	H/A	Result
1909–10	Extra preliminary round	Bacup	11 September 1909	Home	0–3
1910–11	Preliminary round	Burnley Casuals	17 September 1910	Away	1–1
1910–11	Preliminary round	Burnley Casuals	21 September 1910	Home	4–0
1910–11	First qualifying round	Barnoldswick United	1 October 1910	Away	0–3
1911–12	Preliminary round	Rossendale United	16 September 1911	Away	0–8
1912–13	Preliminary round	Haslingden	28 September 1912	Away	1–3
1913–14	Preliminary round	Tottington	27 September 1913	Home	4–2
1913–14	First qualifying round	Southport Central	11 October 1913	Home	1–9
1914–15	Preliminary round	Barnoldswick United	26 September 1914	Away	2–4
1919–20	Preliminary round	Breightmet United	27 September 1919	Home	0–3
1920–21	Preliminary round	Lancaster Town	25 September 1920	Home	2–3
1921–22	Preliminary round	Skelmersdale United	24 September 1921	Away	0–1
1923–24	Preliminary round	Morecambe	22 September 1923	Away	0–3
1924–25	Preliminary round	Horwich RMI	20 September 1924	Away	2–4
1925–26	Preliminary round	Lancaster Town	19 September 1925	Away	0–4
1926–27	Extra preliminary round	Walsden United	4 September 1926	Away	0–1
