= John Walmsley (footballer) =

English footballer

Personal information
- Full name: John William Walmsley
- Date of birth: 22 April 1903
- Place of birth: Accrington, England
- Date of death: 1970 (aged 66–67)
- Place of death: Haslingden, England
- Height: 5 ft 9 in (1.75 m)
- Position: Wing half

Senior career*
Years	Team	Apps	(Gls)
1920–1921	Bacup Borough	?	(?)
1921–1922	Nelson	1	(0)
1922–1924	Barnoldswick Town	?	(?)
1924–1926	Accrington Stanley	17	(0)
1926–1929	Barnoldswick Town	?	(?)
1929	Great Harwood	?	(?)
1929	Horwich RMI	?	(?)
- * Club domestic league appearances and goals

John William Walmsley (22 April 1903 – 1970) was an English professional association footballer who played predominantly as a wing half. Born in Accrington, Lancashire, he initially played Sunday league football for St Paul's and Accrington St Peter's. Walmsley started his senior playing career in Non-League football with Bacup Borough before joining Football League Third Division North side Nelson in 1921. He played just one match for Nelson, appearing at centre-half in the 2–4 defeat to Wrexham on 26 November 1921.

Walmsley left the club at the end of the 1921–22 season to join Barnoldswick Town. After spending two years with Barnoldswick, he moved back into the Football League, signing for Accrington Stanley in the summer of 1924. He made nine league appearances for the side in his first season as the team finished 17th in the division. The following campaign, he played eight times in the league as Accrington achieved an 18th-placed finish. He left the club at the end of the 1925–26 season, and subsequently had spells with Barnoldswick Town, Great Harwood and Horwich RMI before moving into local amateur football in the early 1930s.
