= Walter Casson =

English footballer

Personal information
- Date of birth: 22 January 1895
- Place of birth: Blyth, Northumberland, England
- Date of death: 1965 (aged 69–70)
- Height: 5 ft 9 in (1.75 m)
- Position: Forward

Senior career*
Years	Team	Apps	(Gls)
1920–1921	Blyth Spartans		
1921–1922	South Shields	9	(2)
1922–1924	Grimsby Town	19	(5)
1921–1925	Pontypridd		
1925–1926	Exeter City	8	(3)
- * Club domestic league appearances and goals

Walter Casson (22 January 1895 – 1965) was an English professional footballer who played as a forward.
