= Russell Payne (author) =

English writer and artist

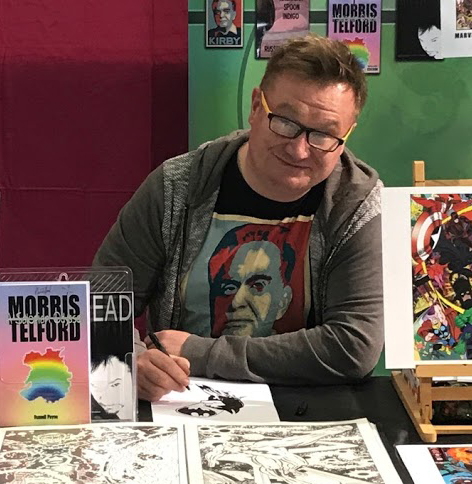
- Born: 1971 (age 54–55); Huddersfield, Yorkshire, England
- Occupations: Novelist, artist, musician, comics writer, screenwriter
- Writing career
- Pen name: Russ Payne, Morris Telford, Marlowe Bidforth, Jim Templeton, Ray Bid, Raymond Biddle, RABID
- Period: 1990s–present
- Genres: Fantasy, humour, science fiction, comic books
- Notable works: Morris Telford - A Salopian Odyysey, Marlowe Bidforth's Backpack Adventure, American Spoon Indigo
- Website: therandomers.co.uk

Russell Payne is an English writer and artist, author of humour, science fiction and fantasy short stories and novels, weblogs, graphic novels, comics, and films. His notable works include 'Morris Telford A Salopian Odyssey' weblog for the BBC and subsequent novel, Marlowe Bidforth's Backpack Adventure, and the Prism award-winning American Spoon Indigo. He collaborated with screenwriter Philip Railsback on a number of screenplays. Famous in writing circles for using a staggering number of pseudonyms, he argues that this helps keep his work fresh, ensures the writing stands on its own merit rather than his reputation and "irritates my publicist so much that it's become a self-destructive habit I can't give up". He is also the co-founder along with Darrell Till of the media production company Tiny Lapel.

The music video "Sell Out Story" for the band "The Ohms" was animated and directed by him as a favour for a friend and went on to win the "2004 Mill Award for new media Animation".

He has recently been appearing at comicbook conventions in the UK giving talks on Jack Kirby and representing the Jack Kirby Museum. His digital artwork was used in December 2014 as part of the 'On Creating Reality, by Andy Kaufman' exhibition at the London Frieze.

His writing influences include Douglas Adams, Ray Bradbury, Alan Moore, Neil Gaiman, Robert Rankin, J. R. R. Tolkien, Gene Wolfe, Roger Zelazny, Kurt Vonnegut, and Jack Kirby

== Personal life ==
Payne was born in Huddersfield. He now lives and works near Blackpool, Lancashire.

== Bibliography ==
- Sairiesa (Jordan Hill Press, 1999)
- American Spoon Indigo (RA, 2003)
- Marlowe Bidforth's Backpack Adventure(BBC, 2004)
- Morris Telford - A Salopian Odyssey (BBC, 2005)
- American Spoon Violet (RA, 2007)
- Small Press Simon Artwork (RA, 2011)
- Covers... that never were – Editing, design and colouring (John Watson, 2011)
- Jelhead with Jim Templeton (Jel Books 2011)
- The Ramifications of Felix with Jim Templeton (RA Books 2021)
- A Collaborative Failure with John Watson (English artist) (Lulu 2025)
