= Harry Clegg =

English footballer (born 1898)

Personal information
- Date of birth: 1898
- Place of birth: Burnley, England
- Height: 5 ft 8 1/2 in (1.74 m)
- Position: Goalkeeper

Senior career*
Years	Team	Apps	(Gls)
1921–1922	Nelson	5	(0)
- * Club domestic league appearances and goals

Harry Clegg (1898 – after 1922) was an English professional footballer who played as a goalkeeper. He played five matches in the Football League Third Division North for Nelson in the 1921–22 season.
