= Sammy Todd =

Northern Irish footballer

Personal information
- Full name: Samuel John Todd
- Date of birth: 22 September 1945 (age 81)
- Place of birth: Belfast, Northern Ireland
- Position: Defender

Senior career*
| Years | Team | Apps | (Gls) |
| 1961–1963 | Glentoran | 5 | (0) |
| 1963–1970 | Burnley | 116 | (1) |
| 1970–1974 | Sheffield Wednesday | 24 | (1) |
| 1974 | → Mansfield Town (loan) | 6 | (0) |
- Great Harwood
| 1975 | Dallas Tornado | 5 | (0) |

International career
| 1966–1971 | Northern Ireland | 11 | (0) |
- * Club domestic league appearances and goals

Sammy Todd (born 1945) was a former football player for Burnley and Glentoran.

== Club career ==
Todd joined Burnley from Glentoran as a 17-year-old defender/midfield man in 1962 becoming the third ex-Glens player to transfer to Turf Moor in the 1960s, following Jimmy McIlroy and Alex Elder.

He made his league debut for Burnley against Tottenham Hotspur at Turf Moor in the 1963/64 season, Burnley recording a 7–2 victory over Spurs.

He made a total of 118 appearances for Burnley scoring one league and one League Cup goal.

At the end of the 1969–1970 season, Todd was sold to Sheffield Wednesday for £40,000. He would, however, only make 22 appearances in four seasons in Sheffield and was loaned out to Mansfield in February 1974.

In the twilight of his career, Todd enjoyed brief stints with both Great Harwood of the Northern Premier League and Dallas Tornado of the original NASL.

== International career ==
Todd represented both Northern Ireland schools and the Under-23 team in the 1960s before making his senior debut in 1966.

His first appearance came as a substitute in a friendly game with Mexico at Windsor Park.

He was capped a total of 11 times for Northern Ireland.
