= Dick Crawshaw =

English footballer

Personal information
- Full name: Richard Leigh Crawshaw
- Date of birth: 21 September 1898
- Place of birth: Manchester, England
- Date of death: 23 October 1965 (aged 67)
- Place of death: Manchester, England
- Height: 5 ft 7 1/2 in (1.71 m)
- Position: Inside forward

Youth career
- Stockport County

Senior career*
Years	Team	Apps	(Gls)
1919–1922	Manchester City	25	(6)
1922–1923	Halifax Town	7	(0)
1923–1924	Nelson	32	(10)
1924–1929	Stalybridge Celtic	?	(?)
1929–1931	Mossley	?	(?)
- * Club domestic league appearances and goals

Richard Leigh Crawshaw (21 September 1898 – 23 October 1965) was an English professional footballer. He played as an inside forward. Born in Manchester, he played in the Football League for Manchester City, Halifax Town and Nelson.

== Biography ==
Crawshaw was born on 21 September 1898 in Manchester, Lancashire. A keen sportsman, he listed his hobbies as association football, swimming, cricket and tennis. Crawshaw served in the Royal Navy during the First World War before becoming a professional footballer. His nephew, Dick Duckworth, was also a footballer who played for several Football League clubs including Chesterfield, Rotherham United and York City. Crawshaw died in Manchester on 23 October 1965, at the age of 67.

== Playing career ==
Crawshaw was a youth player with Stockport County. He joined Manchester City in 1919 and in his first season with the club he scored six goals in 21 league appearances. In the following two seasons he played just four league games, before signing for Football League Third Division North side Halifax Town in the summer of 1922. He appeared seven times for Halifax Town, but failed to get on the scoresheet.

Crawshaw moved to Nelson in February 1923 for a transfer fee of £100 as a replacement for the previous inside-left Mike McCulloch. He made his debut for the club on 24 February, scoring the only goal in a 1–0 win against Wigan Borough. During his first part-season with Nelson, he scored five goals in 13 matches as the side achieved promotion to the Football League Second Division. On the club's summer tour of Spain in 1923, Crawshaw scored the opening goal in the defeat to Racing Santander, before netting two goals in the 4–2 victory over Real Madrid. In the next campaign, he played 19 times and scored five goals but could not prevent Nelson being relegated after finishing 21st in the division. At the end of the 1923–24 season, he left Nelson and retired from professional football, having scored 16 goals in a total of 64 league matches. He subsequently moved into non-league football, having spells with Stalybridge Celtic and Mossley.
