= Ernie Young (footballer, born 1892) =

English footballer (1892–1962)

Personal information
- Full name: Ernest Albert Young
- Date of birth: 21 August 1892
- Place of birth: Sunderland, England
- Date of death: 14 December 1962 (aged 70)
- Place of death: Sunderland, England
- Height: 5 ft 9 in (1.75 m)
- Positions: Inside forward; centre forward

Senior career*
Years	Team	Apps	(Gls)
- Sunderland Rovers
- Robert Thompson's
- Horsley Hill
1919–1920	South Shields	10	(4)
1920–1922	Durham City	47	(18)
- Spennymoor United
- * Club domestic league appearances and goals

Ernest Albert Young (21 August 1892 – 14 December 1962) was an English footballer who played as an inside forward or centre forward in the Football League for South Shields and Durham City.

== Life and career ==
Young was born and raised in Sunderland, one of eleven children of Robert Young, a blacksmith, and his wife Elizabeth. The 1911 Census records the 18-year-old Young working as a clerk.

In the years running up to the First World War, Young played football for Sunderland Rovers, Robert Thompson's and Horsley Hill. After the war, he joined South Shields, newly elected to the Second Division for the first post-war Football League season. He made ten league appearances and scored four goals – two in a 5–2 win against Nottingham Forest in November and another two as South Shields beat Rotherham County 6–2 the following April – but played less first-team football than might have been the case had his reluctance to give up his job and sign as a full-time professional not excluded him from lengthy away trips. He was top scorer for South Shields' reserve team in the North-Eastern League.

At the end of the season, despite reported attention from clubs including First Division Derby County, Young preferred to drop down a level to sign for North-Eastern League club Durham City. An injury near the start of the season "seriously handicapped" his club, but once restored to fitness he soon returned to goalscoring form. Durham City were elected to the newly formed Football League Third Division North in 1921, and Young scored their first Football League goal after ten minutes of the opening match of the season, away to Southport. By the end of the year, he had reached double figures himself as well as creating goals for team-mates. He finished the campaign with 13 goals from 29 matches, which made him the team's second highest scorer. He was appointed captain for their second season, and was again second highest scorer, but with only 5 goals from 21 league matches as Durham City finished bottom of the division. That was the end of his Football League career, although he continued playing for Spennymoor United of the North-Eastern League.

Young married Isabella Morgan Elliott in 1923. The 1939 Register finds him employed as a wages clerk by the Sunderland Gas Company and living with Isabella and a school-age daughter, Dorothy, in Westfield Court, Sunderland. The couple were still resident at that address at the time of Young's death in 1962 at the age of 70.

== Sources ==
- Dykes, Garth (2010). Durham City FC in the Football League. Nottingham: SoccerData. ISBN 978-1-905891-42-9.
- Thompson, George (2000). South Shields F.C.: the Football League years. Harefield: Yore. ISBN 978-1-87442-743-8.
