= Joseph Birds =

English footballer (1887–1966)

Personal information
- Full name: Joseph Birds
- Date of birth: 29 October 1887
- Place of birth: Youlgreave, England
- Date of death: 28 April 1966 (aged 78)
- Place of death: Stockport, England
- Height: 5 ft 9 in (1.75 m)
- Position: Goalkeeper

Senior career*
Years	Team	Apps	(Gls)
1909–1910	Hazel Grove		
1910–1913	Stockport County	15	(0)
1913–1915	Macclesfield	47	(0)
1915–1922	Stockport County	22	(0)
1922–1924	Nelson	40	(0)
- * Club domestic league appearances and goals

Joseph Birds (29 October 1887 – 28 April 1966) was an English professional footballer who played as a goalkeeper. Despite not being particularly tall for his position, he was described as extremely agile and a good shot-stopper. He started his career in non-league football with Hazel Grove before moving to Football League Second Division side Stockport County in 1910. He moved to Macclesfield in 1913 and made 55 appearances prior to the outbreak of the First World War. During the conflict, Birds played as a wartime guest for Manchester City. After the war, he made a further 23 appearances for Stockport before moving to Third Division North outfit Nelson in the summer of 1922.

Birds made his debut for Nelson on 26 August 1922 in the 2–6 defeat away to Bradford Park Avenue. The team conceded only 10 goals at home in the league all season as they achieved promotion to the Second Division in 1922–23. In a higher league, Birds found first team opportunities limited, playing four times at the start of the 1923–24 campaign before being replaced by former Portsmouth goalkeeper Harry Abbott. Birds left Nelson in the summer of 1924 and subsequently retired from professional football.

== Personal life ==
Birds was married and served as an acting corporal in the Royal Garrison Artillery during the First World War. His brother Walter was killed in action in France in June 1917.
