= Richard Baird =

English footballer

Personal information
- Date of birth: 20 February 1892
- Place of birth: Nelson, England
- Date of death: 27 February 1977 (aged 85)
- Place of death: Nelson, England
- Position: Winger

Senior career*
Years	Team	Apps	(Gls)
1920–1921	Nelson		
1921	Bacup Borough		
1921–1922	Rossendale United		
1922	Nelson	2	(0)
1922–1923	Chorley		
1923–1925	Great Harwood		
1925–1926	Colne Town		
- * Club domestic league appearances and goals

Richard Baird (20 February 1892 – 27 February 1977) was an English professional footballer who played as a winger. He played two matches in the Football League Third Division North for Nelson in the 1921–22 season.
