= Ray Hartley =

English footballer

Personal information
- Place of birth: England
- Height: 5 ft 7 1/2 in (1.71 m)
- Position: Wing half

Senior career*
Years	Team	Apps	(Gls)
1921–1922	Nelson	1	(0)
- * Club domestic league appearances and goals

Raymond Hartley was an English professional footballer who played as a wing half. He played one match in the Football League Third Division North for Nelson in the 1921–22 season.
