= Cyril Matthews =

English footballer

Personal information
- Full name: Cyril Henry Matthews
- Date of birth: 9 August 1897
- Place of birth: Cowes, Isle of Wight, England
- Date of death: 1993 (aged 95–96)
- Position: Winger

Senior career*
Years	Team	Apps	(Gls)
1918–1919	Cowes		
1919–1920	Walney United		
1921–1924	Barrow	84	(16)
1924–1927	Bury	67	(14)
1928–1929	Notts County	15	(0)
1929–1930	Lincoln City	0	(0)
1930–1931	Stockport County	34	(11)
1931–1932	Chester	9	(1)
1932–1933	Hyde United	37	(8)
Total		209	(42)
- * Club domestic league appearances and goals

Cyril Henry Matthews (9 August 1897 – 1993) was an English footballer who played in the Football League for Barrow, Bury, Chester, Notts County and Stockport County.
