= Westby Heath =

English footballer

Personal information
- Full name: Westby Heath
- Date of birth: 22 February 1891
- Place of birth: Horton-in-Ribblesdale, England
- Date of death: 1961 (aged 69–70)
- Place of death: Beeston, England
- Positions: Centre half; centre forward

Senior career*
Years	Team	Apps	(Gls)
1914–1915	Luton Town	7	(1)
1919–1923	Stockport County	84	(14)
1923	Chester		
Total		84	(14)
- * Club domestic league appearances and goals

Westby Heath (22 February 1891 – 1961) was an English footballer who played in the Football League for Stockport County as a centre half or centre forward.

== Personal life ==
Heath was wounded during the course of his service as a private in the Royal Army Medical Corps during the First World War.

== Career statistics ==
Appearances and goals by club, season and competition
Club	Season	League			FA Cup		Total	
Club	Season	Division	Apps	Goals	Apps	Goals	Apps	Goals
Luton Town	1914–15	Southern League First Division	7	1	0	0	7	1
Stockport County	1919–20	Second Division	6	1	0	0	6	1
Stockport County	1920–21	Second Division	25	6	0	0	25	6
Stockport County	1921–22	Third Division North	34	7	1	0	35	7
Stockport County	1922–23	Second Division	19	0	1	0	10	0
Stockport County	Total		84	14	2	0	86	14
Career total			91	15	2	0	93	15

== Honours ==
Stockport County

- Football League Third Division North: 1921–22
