= Arthur Wolstenholme =

English footballer (1889–1958)

Personal information
- Full name: Arthur Wolstenholme
- Date of birth: 14 May 1889
- Place of birth: Middleton, England
- Date of death: 1958 (aged 68)
- Place of death: Manchester, England
- Height: 5 ft 8 in (1.73 m)
- Position: Inside forward

Senior career*
Years	Team	Apps	(Gls)
1908–1909	Oldham Athletic	30	(10)
1909–1912	Blackpool	76	(14)
1912–1913	Gillingham	24	(4)
1913–1914	Norwich City	36	(15)
1914–1919	Lincoln City	30	(7)
1919–1920	Oldham Athletic	22	(2)
1920–1921	Newport County	29	(7)
1921–1922	Darlington	29	(17)
1922–1925	Nelson	68	(17)
1925–1926	Colne Town	?	(?)
- * Club domestic league appearances and goals

Arthur Wolstenholme (14 May 1889 – 1958) was an English professional footballer who played as an inside forward. He was predominantly used as an inside-right, but could also play at inside-left if required. In a career spanning 17 years, he played for a number of Football League teams, in addition to spells in the Southern Football League with Gillingham and Norwich City. Wolstenholme was the first player ever to score four goals in a Football League Third Division North fixture.

== Biography ==
Arthur Wolstenholme was born on 14 May 1889 in Middleton near Manchester. After his football career ended, he returned to Manchester, where he died in early 1958, at the age of 68.

== Career ==
Wolstenholme played junior football with Tonge until the age of 18 before joining Football League Second Division club Oldham Athletic towards the end of the 1907–08 season. The following campaign, he became more of a first-team regular, scoring 10 goals in 26 league appearances as the team finished sixth in the division. In 1909–10 he played a further two matches for Oldham before being signed by Blackpool on a free transfer in December 1909. He made his debut for the Seasiders on 8 January, in a 2–1 defeat at Wolverhampton Wanderers. He made a further eight appearances for Blackpool during their 1909–10 campaign, and scored his first League goal for the club in a 3–0 victory at West Bromwich Albion on 16 April. His first overall goal, however, came in their FA Cup first-round tie with Barnsley at Bloomfield Road on New Year's Day.

The following season, 1910–11, Wolstenholme appeared in all but two of Blackpool's League and FA Cup games. He scored four goals, all in the former competition, as the club finished seventh in Division Two. In 1911–12, Wolstenholme made 31 League appearances and scored nine goals and finished the season as the club's top scorer. Three of these goals were in single-goal victories: at home to Chelsea on 25 November; at home to Bristol City two games later, on 9 December; and against Wolves on 17 April, again at Bloomfield Road. He scored again in the FA Cup, against Crewe Alexandra in the first of two first-round replays on 22 January. Wolstenholme's final appearance for the club occurred in the penultimate League game, a 4–1 defeat at Chelsea on 22 April. In total for Blackpool, he made 81 appearances and scored fifteen goals.

In August 1912, he joined Southern Football League club Gillingham. He made his debut in the club's first match of the 1912–13 season, its first after a change of name from New Brompton, and was a regular in the team for the first two-thirds of the season, but did not play again after 1 March 1913. He made 24 Southern League appearances for the club and scored 4 goals, in a season in which Gillingham scored the lowest number of goals in the division. He next moved to Norwich City in July of the following year. Wolstenholme again changed clubs in the summer of 1914, returning to the Football League with Lincoln City. He netted seven times in 30 appearances for the Imps before competitive football in England was halted by the First World War. In 1915, he rejoined his first club, Oldham Athletic, as a wartime guest player. When league football resumed in 1919, Wolstenholme re-signed for the club permanently for a transfer fee of £75. He scored twice in 22 league matches, and was released at the end of the 1919–20 campaign. He subsequently joined Football League Third Division side Newport County in June 1920, where he made 29 league appearances and scored seven goals. In the summer of 1921, he moved to Darlington on a free transfer. During the side's 7–0 win over Chesterfield on 10 September 1921, Wolstenholme became the first player ever to score four times in a Football League Third Division North match. He ended the season with a tally of 17 goals in 29 league appearances, helping Darlington to a second-place finish in the division behind Stockport County.

Despite his goalscoring exploits with Darlington, Wolstenholme was released in the summer of 1922. He was quickly signed by Nelson manager David Wilson, who had played with Wolstenholme during his time at Oldham Athletic. He made his debut for Nelson in the 2–6 defeat to Bradford Park Avenue on 26 August 1922 and scored his first goal for the club in the 1–3 loss to Ashington on 7 October 1922. Wolstenholme netted a hat-trick in the 3–0 victory against his old club Darlington on 23 December 1922 to keep Nelson top of the league after 16 matches of the season. He ended the 1922–23 season on 13 goals as the team were crowned champions of the Third Division North, and won promotion to the Second Division for the first time in their history. He was on the scoresheet twice in the following campaign, against Stockport County and Blackpool, but could not prevent Nelson returning to the third tier after finishing 21st in the division. Wolstenholme was given a coaching role in 1924, but continued to make sporadic appearances for the first-team, scoring two goals in seven matches in the 1924–25 season. His final professional appearance came on 7 February 1925, in Nelson's 4–1 win over Tranmere Rovers at Seedhill. After leaving Nelson in the summer of 1925, Wolstenholme had a short spell in non-League football with Colne Town before retiring from football completely in 1926.

== Career statistics ==
Club	Season	Division	League		FA Cup		Total	
Club	Season	Division	Apps	Goals	Apps	Goals	Apps	Goals
Oldham Athletic	1907–08	Second Division	2	0	0	0	2	0
Oldham Athletic	1908–09	Second Division	26	10	1	0	27	10
Oldham Athletic	1909–10	Second Division	2	0	0	0	2	0
Blackpool	1909–10	Second Division	10	1	2	1	12	2
Blackpool	1910–11	Second Division	36	4	1	0	37	4
Blackpool	1911–12	Second Division	31	9	2	1	33	10
Gillingham	1912–13	Southern League	24	4	?	?	24	4
Norwich City	1913–14	Southern League	36	15	?	?	36	15
Lincoln City	1914–15	Second Division	30	7	2	3	32	10
Oldham Athletic	1919–20	First Division	22	2	1	0	23	2
Newport County	1920–21	Third Division South	29	8	2	0	31	8
Darlington	1921–22	Third Division North	29	17	3	0	32	17
Nelson	1922–23	Third Division North	36	13	2	0	38	13
Nelson	1923–24	Second Division	25	2	0	0	25	2
Nelson	1924–25	Third Division North	7	2	1	1	8	3
Total			345	94	17	6	362	100

== Honours ==
Nelson:

- Football League Third Division North: 1922–23

== Bibliography ==
- Dykes, Garth (2009). Nelson FC in the Football League. SoccerData. ISBN 978-1-905891-29-0.
- Joyce, Michael (2004). Football League Players' Records 1888–1939. SoccerData. ISBN 1-899468-67-6.
- Robinson, Michael (2006). Football League Tables 1888–2006. Soccer Books. ISBN 1-86223-143-5.
