= Harry Thoms =

English footballer

Personal information
- Full name: Henry James Thoms
- Date of birth: 16 November 1896
- Place of birth: Greatham, County Durham, England
- Date of death: 1970 (aged 73–74)
- Position: Half-back

Senior career*
Years	Team	Apps	(Gls)
1914–1915	Greatham		
1921–1922	Hartlepools United	33	(1)
1922–1928	Derby County	179	(4)
1928–1929	Crystal Palace	6	(1)
1930	Glentoran		
Total		218	(6)
- * Club domestic league appearances and goals

Henry James Thoms (16 November 1896 – 1970) was an English footballer who played in the Football League for Crystal Palace, Derby County and Hartlepools United.
