= Mike McCulloch =

Scottish footballer

Personal information
- Full name: Michael McCulloch
- Date of birth: 26 April 1891
- Place of birth: Denny, Scotland
- Date of death: 21 August 1973 (aged 82)
- Place of death: Edinburgh, Scotland
- Positions: Inside forward; wing half

Youth career
- Denny Hibernian

Senior career*
Years	Team	Apps	(Gls)
1913–1921	Falkirk	161	(22)
1921–1922	Heart of Midlothian	10	(0)
1922–1924	Nelson	49	(8)
1924–1925	Chesterfield	3	(0)
1925	Bournemouth & Boscombe Athletic	10	(1)
1925–26	St Bernard's	15	(0)
- * Club domestic league appearances and goals

Michael McCulloch (26 April 1891 – 21 August 1973) was a Scottish professional footballer who played predominantly as an inside forward and occasionally as a wing half.

== Life and career ==
Born in Denny, Falkirk, McCulloch started his career as a player with his hometown Junior club Denny Hibernian, and also made several appearances on the Scottish Junior International team before turning professional when he joined Falkirk in July 1913. Within eight years of joining the club, he was made team captain and played over 160 first-team matches. In the summer of 1921, McCulloch moved to Heart of Midlothian on a free transfer. He spent one season with Hearts before joining Football League Third Division North side Nelson for a fee of £150 in June 1922.

McCulloch made his Nelson debut in the first match of the 1922–23 season, a 2–6 loss to Bradford Park Avenue on 26 August 1922. He scored his first goal for the club the following week in the return match at Seedhill. After appearing in all of the first 23 matches of the campaign, he spent a spell out of the side following the signing of Dick Crawshaw. McCulloch returned to the first-team towards the end of the season, playing the final four games of the season at the unfamiliar position of right half-back. Altogether, he played 28 matches and scored six goals in his first season with Nelson, as the team finished champions of the Third Division North, thereby gaining promotion to the Football League Second Division for the first time in their history.

It was McCulloch who scored Nelson's first ever goal in the Second Division, in the 1–1 draw with Clapton Orient on 25 August 1923. After three matches of the season, he was again moved to right half-back, a position which he kept for the rest of the first half of the campaign. Following the 1–1 draw with Fulham on 22 December 1923, McCulloch was dropped from the team and spent a long period in the reserves. Nelson supporters made clear their disappointment at the omission of McCulloch, by writing several letters to the Nelson Leader, questioning the team selection. He was briefly reinstated to the team at the end of the season, scoring in the 1–3 defeat to Leicester City before playing his final match for Nelson on 26 April 1924 in the 0–1 loss to Leeds United.

McCulloch joined Third Division North side Chesterfield on a free transfer in June 1924. However, he found it difficult to break into the first-team, playing only three matches for the club before leaving to join Football League Third Division South outfit Bournemouth & Boscombe Athletic in March 1925. He scored one goal in 10 league appearances for Bournemouth before being released at the end of the season. McCulloch returned to his native town in Scotland and had a short spell with Scottish Football League Division Two club St Bernard's before retiring from football. He remained in Scotland following the conclusion of his football career, and died in Edinburgh on 21 August 1973, at the age of 82.
