= John Black (footballer, born 1900) =

Scottish footballer

Personal information
- Full name: John Ross Black
- Date of birth: 26 May 1900
- Place of birth: Dunipace, Scotland
- Date of death: December 1993 (aged 93)
- Place of death: Scunthorpe, England
- Height: 5 ft 8 in (1.73 m)
- Positions: Outside forward; wing half

Youth career
- Denny Hibernian

Senior career*
Years	Team	Apps	(Gls)
1921–1922	Sunderland	2	(0)
1922–1924	Nelson	29	(5)
1924	Accrington Stanley	14	(5)
1924–1926	Chesterfield	21	(0)
1926–1930	Luton Town	91	(4)
1930–1932	Bristol Rovers	49	(2)
Total		206	(16)
- * Club domestic league appearances and goals

John Ross Black (26 May 1900 – December 1993) was a Scottish professional footballer who usually played as an outside forward or wing half.

== Biography ==
John Ross Black was born in Dunipace, Stirlingshire on 26 May 1900. His elder brother Adam played for Leicester City, and holds the record for the most first-team appearances for the club. He served in the Gordon Highlanders Army regiment in the late 1910s, before starting his football career. After his retirement from football, Black continued to live in England, and he died in Scunthorpe, Lincolnshire, in December 1993 at the age of 93.

== Career ==
Black started his football career with Scottish Junior side Denny Hibernian in the early 1920s. In April 1921, he was signed as an amateur by Football League First Division club Sunderland. He was awarded a professional contract at the start of the 1921–22 season, but did not become a first-team regular and made only two first-team appearances for the team during the campaign. In the summer of 1922, Black signed for Football League Third Division North outfit Nelson on a free transfer. He was not inserted straight into the team, but made his debut for the club in the sixth league game of the season, a 2–0 win over Southport on 23 September 1922. He continued to play at outside-right for the next nine matches, scoring his first Nelson goal in the 1–0 win against Tranmere Rovers on 28 October, before his place in the side was taken by Sid Hoad.

In January 1923, Black was moved to inside left for two games before a spell at centre forward in which he scored three goals in four matches, including a brace against Chesterfield on 10 March. Towards the end of the campaign he was moved into the defense, and played several games at right wing-half and right fullback. He ended the season with five goals in 23 appearances as Nelson finished as champions of the Third Division North, gaining promotion to the Football League Second Division for the first time in their history. In a higher division, Black found his first-team opportunities limited, playing six games at the start of the season, including one match in the unfamiliar position of inside-right. His final league appearance for Nelson came on 15 September 1923 in the 1–1 home draw with Hull City.

Black transferred to Third Division North side Accrington Stanley in February 1924. He impressed during his spell at Peel Park, netting five goals in 14 league games. His performances earned him a move to Chesterfield in the summer of 1925, for a fee of £25. In his first season with the Spireites, he made 19 league appearances but failed to get on the scoresheet. Black suffered a broken leg at the start of the 1925–26 season, restricting him to only two more league games for the club before leaving to join Third Division South side Luton Town at the start of the following campaign. After almost 100 league appearances in four seasons with the Bedfordshire outfit, Black joined Bristol Rovers, where he played 49 games and scored two goals before retiring from football at the end of the 1931–32 season.
