= Gordon Jones (footballer, born 1889) =

English footballer

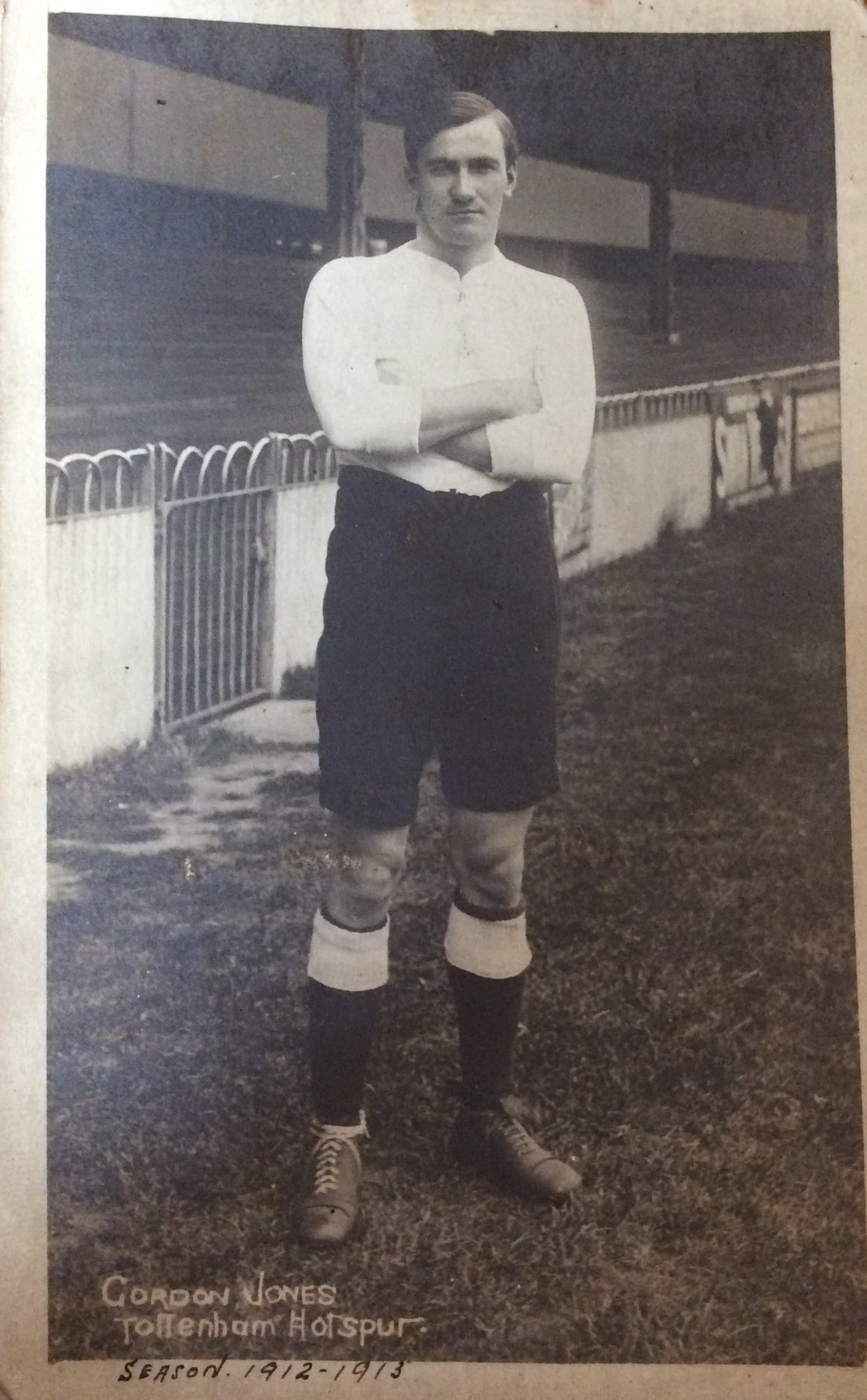

Personal information
- Full name: Gordon Jones
- Date of birth: 1 February 1889
- Place of birth: Birkenhead, England
- Position: Inside right

Senior career*
Years	Team	Apps	(Gls)
- Bedlington St Andrews
- Melrose
- Birkenhead
1909–1911	Bolton Wanderers	22	(6)
1912	Tottenham Hotspur	7	(0)
- Chester City
1913–1914	Glenavon		
1914	South Liverpool		
- Hurst
- Chester City
- Crichtons Athletic
1921	Wrexham	1	(1)
- Connah's Quay & Shotton United
- Hurst
- Flint Town
- * Club domestic league appearances and goals

Gordon Jones (born 1 February 1889; date of death unknown) was an English footballer who played for Bedlington St Andrews, Melrose, Birkenhead, Bolton Wanderers, Tottenham Hotspur, Chester City, South Liverpool, Hurst, Crichtons Athletic, Wrexham, Connah's Quay, Flint Town United.

== Football career ==
Jones played for non–League clubs Bedlington St Andrews, Melrose and Birkenhead before joining Bolton Wanderers. In 1912 the inside right joined Tottenham Hotspur where he played a total of seven matches. After leaving White Hart Lane, Jones made appearances for Chester City, South Liverpool, Hurst, Crichtons Athletic before signing for Wrexham in 1921. He went on to play for Connahs Quay and finally Flint Town.

== Personal life ==
Jones served as a private in the British Armed Forces during the First World War.
