= John Watson (English artist) =

- Born: Blackpool, Lancashire
- Areas: Penciler, Oil paints
- Notable works: Hawkman; Son Of M Silent War

John Watson was born in the 1970s in Blackpool, England. He is one of the few remaining comic book artists who specialises in painting in oils, and has done a number of notable cover runs for both Marvel and DC comics, most recently painting all the covers for the Marvel Apes series and for the second year running, the Triple-A Baseball covers. He has also illustrated a number of trading cards. Since 2021 he has also written novels, notably The Generation series. [ref:https://downthetubes.net/comic-artist-john-watson-makes-his-fantasy-novel-debut-as-author/]

== Biography ==
Watson studied Fine Art at the Cheltenham & Gloucester college. He notes Norman Rockwell as an influence alongside more conventional comicbook influences such as Alex Toth, Nick Cardy, Neal Adams and George Pérez.

A comicbook fan since childhood, his official website says "When I was 12, I realised that being a millionaire, having a cave under the house and fighting crime wasn't going to happen, so I began to concentrate on 'drawing comics' instead."

== Bibliography ==
Silent War #1 (2007): Black Bolt and the Fantastic Four on the cover of the first issue of Silent War by John Watson

=== Comics ===
His comic work includes:

- JLA: Riddle of the Beast (with Alan Grant, Elseworlds, DC, 2002)
- World War Hulk: Gamma Files (Marvel, 2007)

==== Covers ====
- Hawkman #11,15-21,23-25 (DC, 2002–2003)
- JSA #56-58 (DC, 2003)
- JSA Strange Adventures #1-6 (DC, 2004)
- Uncanny X-Men #477,480,483,486 (Marvel)
- Son of M (Marvel, 2006)
- Civil War: Front Line (Marvel, 2006–2007)
- Inhumans: Silent War #1-6 (Marvel, 2007)
- World War Hulk: Frontline #1-6 (Marvel, 2007)
- She-Hulk #20 (Marvel, 2007)
- Marvel Illustrated: Moby Dick (Marvel, 2008)
- Marvel Triple A Baseball Selected covers (Marvel 2007 & 2008)
- Marvel Apes (Marvel, 2008)
- Buck Rogers (Dynamite, 2009)
- Stargate SG-1 - Daniel Jackson (Interiors)(Dynamite, 2010)

=== Books ===
- The Generation: Origins (2021)
- The Generation: A New England (2024)
- A Collaborative Failure with Russell Payne (author) (2025)
