= Albert Waterall =

English footballer

Personal information
- Date of birth: 3 March 1890
- Place of birth: Radford, England
- Date of death: 1963 (aged 72–73)
- Height: 5 ft 8 in (1.73 m)
- Position: Wing half

Senior career*
Years	Team	Apps	(Gls)
1908–1909	Radford Institute		
1909–1910	Sneinton		
1910–1913	Notts County	26	(1)
1913–1926	Stockport County	290	(35)
1926	Queens Park Rangers	2	(0)
1926	Clapton Orient	2	(1)
1926	Grantham		
Total		320	(37)
- * Club domestic league appearances and goals

Albert Waterall (3 March 1890 – 1963) was an English footballer who played in the Football League for Clapton Orient, Notts County, Queens Park Rangers and Stockport County.

== Personal life ==
In September 1915, a year after the beginning of the First World War, Waterall attested in the Army Reserve. Between February and June 1918, when he was discharged as "no longer fit for war service", he served as a sapper in the Sherwood Foresters and the Inland Waterways and Docks section of the Royal Engineers.
