= William Waller (footballer) =

English footballer

Personal information
- Full name: William Waller
- Date of birth: 1898
- Place of birth: Bolton, England
- Height: 5 ft 8 in (1.73 m)
- Position: Inside forward

Senior career*
Years	Team	Apps	(Gls)
1921–1922	Nelson	25	(7)
1922–1923	Burnley	1	(0)
1923–1924	Queens Park Rangers	2	(0)
Total		28	(7)
- * Club domestic league appearances and goals

William Waller (1898 – after 1923) was an English professional footballer who played as an inside forward. He played in the Football League for Nelson, Burnley and Queens Park Rangers.
