= Les Latcham =

English footballer (1942–2026)

Personal information
- Full name: Leslie Arnold Latcham
- Date of birth: 22 December 1942
- Place of birth: Crook, County Durham, England
- Date of death: 8 October 2026 (aged 83)
- Position: Left-back

Senior career*
| Years | Team | Apps | (Gls) |
| 1964–1971 | Burnley | 153 | (10) |
| 1971–1973 | Plymouth Argyle | 83 | (13) |
| 1973–1974 | Bradford City | 15 | (2) |
- Great Harwood
- * Club domestic league appearances and goals

Leslie Arnold Latcham (22 December 1942 – 8 October 2026) was an English professional footballer who played as a left-back. His away début at Manchester United in February 1965, and his second game one week later, were in the FA Cup, again against Manchester United, both at Old Trafford. He made 178 appearances for Burnley.

Latcham played for Burnley in the 1966–67 Inter-Cities Fairs Cup, helping the club reach the quarter-finals.

Latcham died on 8 October 2026, aged 83.
