= Robert Bruce (footballer) =

Scottish footballer (1895–1968)

Personal information
- Full name: Robert Fotheringham Bruce
- Date of birth: 11 March 1895
- Place of birth: Bridge of Allan, Scotland
- Date of death: 8 February 1968 (aged 72)
- Place of death: Bridge of Allan, Scotland
- Position: Goalkeeper

Senior career*
Years	Team	Apps	(Gls)
1916–1917	Raith Rovers		
1917–1918	Partick Thistle	16	(0)
1919–1920	Alloa Athletic		
1920–1921	Kirkintilloch Rob Roy		
1921–1922	Nelson	10	(0)
- Stenhousemuir
- Broxburn United
- * Club domestic league appearances and goals

Robert Fotheringham Bruce (11 March 1895 – 8 February 1968) was a Scottish professional footballer, who played as a goalkeeper. He played seven matches in the Football League Third Division North and made three FA Cup appearances for Nelson in the 1921–22 season.

== Life and career ==
At an early age, Robert, the second son of James and Janet Bruce, a foreman at a blast furnace, lived at Old Mews, in the parish of Logie, Stirlingshire. In 1916 he was living at Cowie when he joined Cowie Wanderers, and then joined Raith Rovers in April. By February 1917, he was contracted for £1 per week, with 4s 6/ expenses at Partick Thistle. He made his senior Scottish debut on 9 April 1916, keeping a clean sheet in his club's victory against Clyde FC. He played 16 full matches in 1917–18 season as well as winning a medal in the Glasgow Charity Cup at Hampden Park won by Celtic. That April he left for Alloa Athletic for one season, and then joined Kirkintilloch Rob Roy, a club named after the Jacobite Highland hero. He was a Scottish Junior Cup winner for Rob Roy before moving to English football.

In October 1921, Bruce joined Nelson FC in the mill towns of Lancashire. Nelson were enjoying a golden period in their history: promoted to the newly-formed Northern Section of the Third Division, joining the Football League for the first time. Their team included George Wilson, a former international out of Sheffield Wednesday, as gate receipts reached a new high, when they met Accrington Stanley at Seedhill on 15 October 1921. The Scots player-manager Wilson was a shrewd judge of character. Nelson won the Division that season with reserve players on the bench: many of whom had fought in the Great War. In total Bruce appeared ten times for Nelson with mainly clean sheets, making his debut against Chesterfield on 22 October 1921. He conceded a goal that day, but Nelson won the match at Saltergate, and then a week later at Seedhill, a clean sheet. This impressed the manager, so he played the season. However, on Boxing Day 1921 he conceded five in a home defeat to Durham City.

Bruce was advised to leave the club and return to Scottish football, so he joined Plean and then, Stenhousemuir in September 1922. Later on he joined Broxburn United in Scottish Football League Second Division.

Bruce died in Bridge of Allan on 8 February 1968, at the age of 72.

== Sources ==
- Joyce, Michael (2004). Football League Players' Records 1888-1939. SoccerData.
- Dykes, Garth (2009). Nelson F.C. in the Football League: A Complete Record 1921–31. SoccerData. p. 19.
