= Eddie Eastwood =

English footballer

Personal information
- Full name: Edmund Eastwood
- Date of birth: 7 January 1902
- Place of birth: Nelson, England
- Date of death: 15 July 1981 (aged 79)
- Place of death: Burnley, England
- Position: Full-back

Youth career
- Barrowford

Senior career*
Years	Team	Apps	(Gls)
1920–1923	Nelson	3	(0)
1923–1929	Morecambe		
1929–1930	Clitheroe		
- * Club domestic league appearances and goals

Edmund Eastwood (7 January 1902 – 15 July 1981) was an English professional footballer who played as a full-back.

Born in Nelson, Lancashire, he began his football career with local club Barrowford. In June 1920, he signed as an amateur for Nelson, who at the time played in the Central League. Eastwood became a regular fixture in the club's reserve team, helping them to the North East Lancashire Combination title in 1921. He made his Football League Third Division North debut for Nelson on 1 October 1921 in the 1–1 draw with Darlington at Seedhill. Eastwood played every reserve team match in the 1921–22 season and was rewarded with a professional contract in May 1922. His second League appearance for Nelson came on 2 April 1923 in the 1–2 loss away at Wrexham. Eastwood played his final competitive match for the club in the 3–0 win at home to Walsall on 28 April 1923, after the team's Third Division North championship had already been confirmed.

Eastwood transferred to Morecambe in July 1923 and enjoyed a regular first-team berth at Christie Park over the following five seasons. In the 1926–27 season Eastwood, along with fellow former Nelson defender Harry Clayton, was part of the Morecambe side that finished third in the Lancashire Combination, won the Combination Cup for the first time, and also won the Lancashire Junior Cup. Eastwood missed a large portion of the 1928–29 campaign through injury, and left the club in the summer of 1929 to join Clitheroe. After one season with Clitheroe, he had spells with Rossendale United, Darwen and Heywood St James before retiring in the mid-1930s. Eastwood continued to live in Lancashire until his death in Burnley on 15 July 1981, aged 79.
