= Cecil Marsh =

English footballer

Personal information
- Date of birth: 15 July 1895
- Place of birth: Darnall, England
- Date of death: 1984 (aged 88–89)
- Height: 5 ft 8 1/2 in (1.74 m)
- Position: Inside forward

Senior career*
| Years | Team | Apps | (Gls) |
- Sheffield United
| 1919–1921 | Blackpool | 5 | (0) |
| 1921–1922 | Nelson | 17 | (2) |
- * Club domestic league appearances and goals

Cecil A. Marsh (15 July 1895 – 1984) was an English professional footballer who played as an inside forward.

Born in Darnall, he started his career with local side Sheffield United before moving to Football League Second Division club Blackpool in the 1919–20 season. He played five league games for Blackpool (four in 1919-20 and one in 1920-21) and left the club in 1921 to join newly promoted Nelson. He made 17 league appearances and scored two goals in the Third Division North but left the team at the end of the 1921–22 campaign.
