= Albert Turner (footballer, born 1901) =

English footballer

Personal information
- Full name: Albert James Turner
- Date of birth: 7 April 1901
- Place of birth: Blackpool, England
- Date of death: 24 April 1985 (aged 84)
- Place of death: Blackpool, England
- Position: Wing half

Senior career*
| Years | Team | Apps | (Gls) |
| 1921–1922 | Nelson | 1 | (0) |
- * Club domestic league appearances and goals

Albert James Turner (7 April 1901 – 24 April 1985) was an English professional footballer who played as a wing half. He made one appearance in the Football League Third Division North for Nelson in the 1921–22 season.
