= Bob Wilde =

English footballer

Personal information
- Full name: Robert Wilde
- Date of birth: 13 September 1900
- Place of birth: Shipley, England
- Date of death: 1939 (aged 38–39)
- Height: 5 ft 9 1/2 in (1.77 m)
- Position: Wing half

Youth career
- 1914–1919: Bradford City

Senior career*
Years	Team	Apps	(Gls)
1919–1921	Bradford City	4	(0)
1921–1922	Nelson	36	(0)
1922–1924	Halifax Town	51	(0)
Total		91	(0)
- * Club domestic league appearances and goals

Robert Wilde (13 September 1900 – 1939) was an English professional footballer who played as a wing half. He made almost 100 appearances in the Football League between 1919 and 1924.
