= Harold Andrews (footballer, born 1897) =

English footballer (1897–1984)

Personal information
- Full name: Harold Edgar Ramsden Andrews
- Date of birth: 8 June 1897
- Place of birth: Earby, England
- Date of death: 20 May 1984 (aged 86)
- Place of death: Daventry, England
- Height: 5 ft 8 1/2 in (1.74 m)
- Position: Inside forward

Senior career*
| Years | Team | Apps | (Gls) |
| 1914–1922 | Nelson | 8 | (1) |
| 1922–1923 | Bury | 0 | (0) |
| 1923 | Luton Town | ? | (?) |
| 1923–1924 | Rushden Town | ? | (40) |
| 1924–1926 | Chorley | ? | (?) |
| 1926–1927 | Torquay United | ? | (26) |
| 1927–1928 | Exeter City | 2 | (0) |
| 1928–1929 | Merthyr Town | 7 | (1) |
| 1929 | Bath City | ? | (?) |
| 1929 | Tunbridge Wells Rangers | 34 | (18) |
- * Club domestic league appearances and goals

Harold Edgar Ramsden Andrews (8 June 1897 – 20 May 1984) was an English professional footballer who played as an inside forward. Born in Earby, he played eight matches and scored one goal in the Football League Third Division North for Nelson during the 1921–22 season before going on to become a prolific goalscorer in non-league football.
