= William McGreevy =

English footballer

Personal information
- Full name: William James McGreevy
- Date of birth: 11 November 1899
- Place of birth: Fleetwood, England
- Date of death: 1981 (aged 81–82)
- Place of death: Fleetwood, England
- Position: Inside forward

Senior career*
Years	Team	Apps	(Gls)
1921–1922	Nelson	3	(1)
- * Club domestic league appearances and goals

William James McGreevy (11 November 1899 – 1981) was an English professional footballer who played as an inside forward. He made three appearances in the Football League for Nelson in the 1921–22 season.
