= Harry Heyes =

English footballer

Personal information
- Full name: Henry Heyes
- Date of birth: 1895
- Place of birth: Aspull, England
- Position: Goalkeeper

Senior career*
Years	Team	Apps	(Gls)
1921–1922	Nelson	26	(0)
- * Club domestic league appearances and goals

Henry Heyes (born 1895) was an English professional footballer who played as a goalkeeper. He played 26 matches in the Football League Third Division North for Nelson in the 1921–22 season. He also had spells in non-league football with Chorley, Coppull and Horwich RMI.
