= James Price (footballer) =

Scottish footballer

Personal information
- Full name: James Price
- Date of birth: 24 April 1896
- Place of birth: Annbank, Scotland
- Date of death: q1 1970 (aged 73)
- Place of death: Ashington, England
- Height: 5 ft 10 in (1.78 m)
- Position: Defender

Senior career*
Years	Team	Apps	(Gls)
1918–1921	Celtic	6	(0)
- → Dumbarton (loan)
- → Airdrieonians (loan)
1921–1923	Nelson	24	(0)
1923–1929	Ashington	234	(10)
- * Club domestic league appearances and goals

James Price (24 April 1896 – q1 1970) was a Scottish professional footballer who played as a defender.
