= Wilfred Proctor =

English footballer (1893–1980)

Personal information
- Full name: Wilfred Proctor
- Date of birth: 23 November 1893
- Place of birth: Fenton, England
- Date of death: 29 October 1980 (aged 86)
- Place of death: Blackpool, England
- Height: 5 ft 8 in (1.73 m)
- Position: Winger

Senior career*
Years	Team	Apps	(Gls)
1920–1921	Blackpool	0	(0)
1921–1922	Nelson	14	(1)
1922–1925	Fleetwood		
1925–19??	Lancaster Town		
- * Club domestic league appearances and goals

Wilfred Proctor (23 November 1893 – 29 October 1980) was an English professional footballer who played as a winger. He started his career with his hometown club Blackpool but failed to make a first-team appearance and left the club in 1921 to join newly promoted Nelson. He played 14 league games and scored one goal in the Football League Third Division North before leaving Nelson in the summer of 1922.
