= John Bennie (footballer) =

Scottish footballer

Personal information
- Full name: John Bennie
- Date of birth: 30 November 1896
- Place of birth: Polmont, Scotland
- Position: Centre forward

Senior career*
Years	Team	Apps	(Gls)
1919–1921	Falkirk	14	(?)
1921	Bo'ness	?	(?)
1921–1922	Nelson	12	(6)
- * Club domestic league appearances and goals

John Bennie (30 November 1896 – after 1921) was a Scottish professional footballer who played as a centre forward. In the 1921–22 season, he played 12 league games and scored six goals for Nelson in the Football League Third Division North.
