= Clem Rigg =

English footballer

Personal information
- Full name: Clement Rigg
- Date of birth: 7 February 1899
- Place of birth: Cornholme, England
- Date of death: 1966 (aged 67)
- Place of death: Todmorden, England
- Height: 5 ft 11 in (1.80 m)
- Position: Full back

Senior career*
| Years | Team | Apps | (Gls) |
| | Portsmouth Rovers | ? | (?) |
| 1920 | Burnley | 0 | (0) |
| 1920–1929 | Nelson | 254 | (4) |
| 1929–1930 | Newcastle United | 0 | (0) |
- * Club domestic league appearances and goals

Clement Rigg (7 February 1899 – 1966) was an English professional footballer who played as a full back. He played over 250 matches in the Football League for Nelson.
