= Great Harwood F.C. =

Great Harwood
- Full name: Great Harwood Football Club
- Nickname: 'Arrad
- Founded: 1880s
- Dissolved: 1978
- Ground: The Showground, Great Harwood
- 1977–78: Northern Premier League, 15/24
Home colours

Great Harwood F.C. was an English football club based in Great Harwood, Lancashire.

== History ==
Founded in the 1880s, Great Harwood won the West Lancashire League in 1906–07, and joined Division Two of the Lancashire Combination in 1908. After World War I the league was reduced to a single division from which the club was eventually relegated in the summer of 1947 following the re-introduction of Division Two . They were later crowned Lancashire Combination Champions in 1968–69 and subsequently became founder members of the Northern Premier League. At the time the side featured several former Football League players including ex-England internationals Ronnie Clayton and Bryan Douglas, and ex-Welsh international Roy Vernon. In 1970–71 under the management of Tommy Cummings they reached the first round of the FA Cup for the first and only time, losing 6–2 at home to Rotherham United.

In the summer of 1978 financial problems caused the club to fold. Following the demise of the club, Great Harwood Wellington became the town's leading football club as they adopted the name Great Harwood Town and immediately took over tenancy of the Showground.

== Colours ==
The club's earliest recorded kit is red jerseys, which by 1912 it had changed to red and black shirts, and by 1916 the club was wearing blue jerseys. By the 1970s the club wore all red.

== Honours ==
- Lancashire Combination
  - Champions 1968–69

== Former players ==
1. Players that have played/managed in the Football League or any foreign equivalent to this level (i.e. fully professional league).
2. Players with full international caps.
3. Players that hold a club record or have captained the club.

- (Scotland) Adam Blacklaw
- (England) Ronnie Clayton
- (England) Alan Cocks
- (England) Bryan Douglas
- (Northern Ireland) Willie Irvine
- (England) Les Latcham
- (Northern Ireland) Sammy Todd
- (England) Richard Dinnis
