= 1927–28 Nelson F.C. season =

Nelson
1927–28 season
- Manager: None
- Football League Third Division North: 22nd (re-elected)
- FA Cup: First Round
- Top goalscorer: League: Bernard Radford (17); All: Bernard Radford (17)
- Highest home attendance: 9,000 (vs Bradford (Park Avenue), 26 November 1927)
- Lowest home attendance: 1,126 (vs Tranmere Rovers, 24 April 1928)
- Average home league attendance: 4,193
Home colours

For the 1927–28 season, Nelson Football Club played as a professional outfit in the Football League for the seventh consecutive campaign. Nelson finished last out of 22 teams in the Third Division North, with a record of 10 wins, 6 draws and 26 defeats, corresponding to a tally of 26 points. As a result, the club was forced to apply for re-election to the League at the end of the season. The application was successful, with Nelson retaining their berth in place of Durham City. Due to the departure of Percy Smith to Bury, Nelson did not have a manager installed during the entire season. The team played inconsistently throughout the campaign from the outset, losing the opening two matches before winning four consecutive games during September 1927. Nelson suffered several comprehensive defeats during the 1927–28 season, including a 1–9 defeat to Bradford City, a 0–8 loss away at Stockport County and a 1–7 reverse against Accrington Stanley. In total, the team conceded 136 goals in 42 league matches, one of the highest totals in Football League history.

Outside of league competition, Nelson entered the FA Cup but were knocked out in the First Round following a 0–3 defeat to Bradford Park Avenue at Seedhill. They also competed in the Lancashire Senior Cup, but suffered a 2–10 loss to Second Division side Manchester City. Nelson used 33 different players during the season. Many of these were new arrivals at the club; a number of the professional staff from the previous campaign had been released due to the club's increasing debts. Forward Jimmy Hampson, the top goalscorer in 1926–27, was sold to Blackpool in October 1927 for a transfer fee of £1,250 and went on to become an England international. His replacement, Bernard Radford, was Nelson's highest scorer in the 1927–28 campaign with 17 league goals. Scottish striker Buchanan Sharp was the only other player to reach double figures with his tally of 11. Only one player, Joe Halliwell appeared in all 43 competitive matches; former England international George Wilson appeared in 40 of the games. Many squad members were bit-part players, with more than half of the team making fewer than 10 competitive appearances.

The highest attendance of the season at Nelson's Seedhill stadium was around 9,000 for the FA Cup tie against Bradford Park Avenue, while the lowest gate was 1,126 (the club's lowest ever Football League attendance) for the 3–5 home defeat to Tranmere Rovers on 24 April 1928.

== Football League Third Division North ==
=== Key ===
- H = Home match
- A = Away match
- In Result column, Nelson's score shown first
- Goalscorers shown in order of first goal scored

=== Match results ===
Date	Opponents	Result	Goalscorers	Attendance
27 August 1927	Accrington Stanley (H)	1–4	Sharp	8,007
3 September 1927	Rochdale (A)	0–1		9,869
10 September 1927	Rotherham United (H)	6–1	Bottrill, Hampson (2), Sharp, White (2)	4,881
12 September 1927	Barrow (H)	4–0	Bedford, Bottrill, White (2)	4,928
17 September 1927	Southport (A)	2–1	Bedford, Hampson	5,406
24 September 1927	Durham City (H)	2–1	Hampson (2)	5,495
29 September 1927	Barrow (A)	1–3	Bedford	4,306
1 October 1927	Wrexham (A)	2–5	White (2)	4,828
8 October 1927	Chesterfield (H)	3–3	Hampson, Sharp, White	4,659
15 October 1927	Bradford Park Avenue (A)	2–3	Bottrill, Sharp	14,833
22 October 1927	New Brighton (H)	0–3		2,698
29 October 1927	Lincoln City (A)	0–0		7,956
5 November 1927	Hartlepools United (H)	4–2	Sharp (3), Spence	2,001
12 November 1927	Bradford City (A)	1–9	Cochrane	15,638
19 November 1927	Halifax Town (H)	3–2	Bottrill, Cochrane, Sharp	3,862
3 December 1927	Ashington (H)	1–5	Spence	2,936
10 December 1927	Wigan Borough (A)	2–4	McGuire, Ruffell	2,736
17 December 1927	Doncaster Rovers (H)	0–1		3,410
27 December 1927	Tranmere Rovers (A)	1–1	Bedford	8,946
31 December 1927	Accrington Stanley (A)	1–7	Ruffell	4,207
2 January 1928	Crewe Alexandra (A)	1–6	Wilson	2,430
7 January 1928	Rochdale (H)	6–3	McClure, McGuire, Radford (3), Taylor	2,539
14 January 1928	Halifax Town (A)	1–5	Radford	3,119
21 January 1928	Rotherham United (A)	3–4	Sharp, Taylor (2)	4,505
4 February 1928	Durham City (A)	0–3		1,537
11 February 1928	Wrexham (H)	4–0	Radford (4)	2,721
18 February 1928	Chesterfield (A)	0–6		3,804
25 February 1928	Bradford Park Avenue (H)	1–2	Wilson	8,096
3 March 1928	New Brighton (A)	0–4		4,290
10 March 1928	Lincoln City (H)	1–3	Bottrill	3,422
17 March 1928	Hartlepools United (A)	5–4	Bottrill, Radford (2), Sharp, Slack	2,972
20 March 1928	Southport (H)	1–1	Bottrill	3,583
24 March 1928	Bradford City (H)	0–3		5,085
6 April 1928	Stockport County (A)	0–8		8,430
7 April 1928	Darlington (H)	4–0	Hayes (2), Sharp, Taylor	3,816
9 April 1928	Stockport County (H)	0–4		5,441
14 April 1928	Ashington (A)	1–5	Slack	1,410
16 April 1928	Darlington (A)	1–4	Hayes	1,003
21 April 1928	Crewe Alexandra (H)	3–3	Radford, Sharp, Slack	2,349
24 April 1928	Tranmere Rovers (H)	3–5	Hayes, Radford (2)	1,126
28 April 1928	Doncaster Rovers (A)	2–4	Hayes, Radford	4,117
5 May 1928	Wigan Borough (H)	3–3	Radford (2), Wilson	2,183

=== Final league position ===
Pos	Team	Pld	W	D	L	GF	GA	GAv	Pts	Promotion or relegation
18	Ashington	42	11	11	20	77	103	0.748	33	
19	Barrow	42	10	11	21	54	102	0.529	31	
20	Wigan Borough	42	10	10	22	56	97	0.577	30	
21	Durham City	42	11	7	24	53	100	0.530	29	Failed re-election
22	Nelson	42	10	6	26	76	136	0.559	26	Re-elected

Source: rsssf.com

== FA Cup ==
=== Match results ===
Round	Date	Opponents	Result	Goalscorers	Attendance
First round	26 November 1927	Bradford Park Avenue (H)	0–3		9,000

== Player statistics ==
Key to positions

- CF = Centre forward
- FB = Fullback
- GK = Goalkeeper
- HB = Half-back
- IF = Inside forward
- OF = Outside forward

Statistics

Nat.	Position	Player	Third Division North		FA Cup		Total
Nat.	Position	Player	Apps	Goals	Apps	Goals	Apps	Goals
(England)	OF	Lewis Bedford	18	3	0	0	18	3
(England)	GK	William Bossons	4	0	1	0	5	0
(England)	IF	Billy Bottrill	35	7	1	0	36	7
(England)	FB	Jimmy Broadhead	1	0	0	0	1	0
(England)	HB	Alfred Brown	2	0	0	0	2	0
(Scotland)	CF	David Cochrane	2	2	1	0	3	2
(England)	IF	James Dargan	2	0	0	0	2	0
(England)	OF	Jack Fletcher	4	0	1	0	5	0
(England)	IF	Richard Gaskell	3	0	0	0	3	0
(England)	HB	Joe Halliwell	42	0	1	0	43	0
(England)	CF	Jimmy Hampson	9	6	0	0	9	6
(England)	HB	Ambrose Harris	8	0	0	0	8	0
(Wales)	CF	George Hayes	9	5	0	0	9	5
(England)	HB	Arthur Hepworth	10	0	0	0	10	0
(England)	FB	Arthur Jones	1	0	0	0	1	0
(England)	FB	Jack Jones	12	0	1	0	13	0
(England)	GK	James Mangham	1	0	0	0	1	0
(Scotland)	FB	David McClure	28	1	0	0	28	1
(England)	IF	John McGuire	20	2	0	0	20	2
(Scotland)	FB	James Pearson	7	0	1	0	8	0
(England)	CF	Bernard Radford	20	17	0	0	20	17
(England)	HB	Dennis Ridge	8	0	0	0	8	0
(England)	FB	Clem Rigg	32	0	0	0	32	0
(England)	IF	Bill Ruffell	12	3	0	0	12	3
(Scotland)	IF	Buchanan Sharp	37	11	1	0	38	11
(England)	HB	Edwin Simpson	15	0	0	0	15	0
(England)	OF	Bill Slack	10	3	0	0	10	3
(England)	OF	George Spence	13	2	1	0	14	2
(England)	GK	John Stoneham	6	0	1	0	7	0
(England)	OF	Harold Taylor	12	4	0	0	12	4
(England)	GK	Sam Warhurst	31	0	0	0	31	0
(England)	IF	Henry White	9	7	0	0	9	7
(England)	HB	George Wilson	39	3	1	0	40	3

== See also ==
- List of Nelson F.C. seasons
