= 1928–29 Nelson F.C. season =

Nelson
1928–29 season
- Manager: Jack English
- Football League Third Division North: 15th
- Top goalscorer: League: Bernard Radford (24); All: Bernard Radford (24)
- Highest home attendance: 14,979 (vs Bradford City, 27 April 1929)
- Lowest home attendance: 2,749 (vs Stockport County, 22 January 1929)
- Average home league attendance: 4,944
Home colours

During the 1928–29 season, Nelson Football Club played as a professional team in the Football League for the eighth time. After playing without a team manager during the previous season, Jack English was appointed to the post in the summer of 1928 following the club's successful re-election application. A record of 17 wins, 5 draws and 20 defeats, giving a total of 39 points, helped Nelson to a 15th-placed finish in the Third Division North, above Rotherham United on goal average. The team was inconsistent throughout the season, as they had been in the previous campaign, although significant improvements in the defense meant that 46 fewer goals were conceded. Nelson's attack was also improved, and the team scored at least once in 36 of their 42 league matches.

Nelson did not compete in the 1928–29 FA Cup, as they did not submit their application by the deadline. The club used a total of 26 different players during the season, but only six of these had been retained from the previous campaign. Yorkshire-born forward Bernard Radford was the top goalscorer for the second consecutive season, with a tally of 24 in 35 matches. With 11 goals, Gerry Kelly, a new signing from Sunderland, was the only other player to reach double figures. Half-back Jim Metcalfe made the most appearances for Nelson, missing only the final game of the season, the 4–4 draw away at Accrington Stanley. The highest attendance at Nelson's Seedhill ground was a record 14,979 for the visit of Bradford City on 27 April 1929, which stood until the stadium was demolished in 1980. Conversely, the lowest gate of the season was 2,749 for the victory against Stockport County on 22 January 1929.

== Football League Third Division North ==
=== Key ===
- H = Home match
- A = Away match
- In Result column, Nelson's score shown first

=== Match results ===
Date	Opponents	Result	Goalscorers	Attendance
25 August 1928	Hartlepools United (A)	2–2	Radford, Ridley	5,524
1 September 1928	Darlington (H)	2–1	Sharp, Wilkinson	7,337
8 September 1928	Southport (A)	1–5	Kelly	4,188
12 September 1928	South Shields (H)	1–0	Kelly	5,843
15 September 1928	Rochdale (H)	3–0	Radford, Wilkinson, Wilson	6,715
22 September 1928	New Brighton (A)	1–0	Radford	4,882
25 September 1928	Lincoln City (H)	3–4	Radford (2), Wilkinson	4,970
29 September 1928	Wrexham (H)	1–3	Ridley	6,280
2 October 1928	Doncaster Rovers (H)	2–4	Radford, Suttie	3,297
6 October 1928	Chesterfield (A)	2–3	Kelly (2)	5,247
13 October 1928	Barrow (H)	3–4	Radford (2), Wilson	4,616
20 October 1928	Carlisle United (A)	0–4		2,321
27 October 1928	Rotherham United (H)	4–2	Buchanan, Kelly, Radford, Wilkinson	3,795
3 November 1928	Wigan Borough (A)	0–1		6,928
10 November 1928	Crewe Alexandra (H)	4–1	Radford (2), Ridley, Wilson	7,445
17 November 1928	Tranmere Rovers (A)	1–6	Radford	4,393
1 December 1928	Halifax Town (A)	2–1	Halliwell, Suttie	5,988
8 December 1928	Ashington (H)	5–0	Kelly (2), Radford (2), Wilkinson	2,915
15 December 1928	Bradford City (A)	2–0	Buchanan, Halliwell	13,236
22 December 1928	Accrington Stanley (H)	0–2		4,791
26 December 1928	Doncaster Rovers (A)	2–2	Halliwell, Kelly	7,369
28 December 1928	Hartlepools United (H)	1–0	Halliwell	3,507
1 January 1929	Ashington (A)	2–3	Radford, Ridley	1,344
5 January 1929	Darlington (A)	2–3	Radford (2)	3,273
19 January 1929	Southport (H)	1–1	Carmedy	3,035
22 January 1929	Stockport County (H)	4–1	Kelly, Morton (2), Ridley	2,749
26 January 1929	Rochdale (A)	1–2	Halliwell	4,902
2 February 1929	New Brighton (H)	3–0	Buchanan, Kelly (2)	3,168
9 February 1929	Wrexham (A)	1–3	Halliwell	5,534
16 February 1929	Chesterfield (H)	1–0	Radford	2,943
23 February 1929	Barrow (A)	2–7	Radford (2)	5,368
2 March 1929	Carlisle United (H)	1–0	Ridley	4,107
9 March 1929	Rotherham United (A)	0–4		3,939
16 March 1929	Wigan Borough (H)	2–1	Radford (2)	3,903
23 March 1929	Crewe Alexandra (A)	1–1	Halliwell	2,976
30 March 1929	Tranmere Rovers (H)	4–2	Buchanan, Radford (2), Wilson	4,245
1 April 1929	South Shields (A)	2–3	Buchanan, Halliwell	4,334
6 April 1929	Stockport County (A)	0–3		7,916
13 April 1929	Halifax Town (H)	3–1	Carmedy, Fletcher, Morton	3,182
20 April 1929	Lincoln City (A)	1–5	Carmedy	4,036
27 April 1929	Bradford City (H)	0–1		14,979
4 May 1929	Accrington Stanley (A)	4–4	Buchanan, Halliwell, Ridley, Wilson	2,671

=== Final league position ===
Pos	Team	Pld	W	D	L	GF	GA	GAv	Pts
13	Halifax Town	42	13	13	16	63	62	1.016	39
14	New Brighton	42	15	9	18	64	71	0.901	39
15	Nelson	42	17	5	20	77	90	0.856	39
16	Rotherham United	42	15	9	18	60	77	0.779	39
17	Rochdale	42	13	10	19	79	96	0.823	36

Source: rsssf.com

== Player statistics ==
Key to positions

- CF = Centre forward
- FB = Fullback
- GK = Goalkeeper
- HB = Half-back
- IF = Inside forward
- OF = Outside forward

Statistics

Nat.	Position	Player	Third Division North
Nat.	Position	Player	Apps	Goals
(England)	FB	Jack Brooks	6	0
(Scotland)	IF	Jim Buchanan	32	6
(England)	OF	Tom Carmedy	8	3
(England)	HB	John Dodsworth	2	0
(England)	FB	Billy Donkin	8	0
(England)	GK	Des Fawcett	23	0
(England)	FB	Ted Ferguson	36	0
(England)	OF	Jack Fletcher	7	1
(Scotland)	HB	Felix Gillan	11	0
(England)	IF	Joe Halliwell	32	9
(England)	HB	Arthur Hepworth	6	0
(England)	FB	Alec Hooper	9	0
(England)	FB	Harry Hooper	13	0
(England)	OF	Gerry Kelly	38	11
(Scotland)	IF	Patrick McDonagh	5	0
(England)	HB	Jim Metcalfe	41	0
(England)	CF	William Morton	8	3
(England)	CF	Bernard Radford	35	24
(England)	OF	Harry Ridley	31	7
(England)	FB	Clem Rigg	11	0
(Scotland)	IF	Buchanan Sharp	8	1
(Scotland)	HB	David Suttie	28	2
(England)	HB	Harry Tordoff	1	0
(England)	GK	Sam Warhurst	19	0
(England)	IF	Tom Wilkinson	17	5
(England)	HB	George Wilson	27	5

== See also ==
- List of Nelson F.C. seasons
