= 1926–27 Nelson F.C. season =

Nelson
1926–27 season
- Manager: Percy Smith
- Football League Third Division North: 5th
- FA Cup: Second Round
- Top goalscorer: League: Jimmy Hampson and Buchanan Sharp (23); All: Jimmy Hampson (25)
- Highest home attendance: 12,415 (vs Bradford (Park Avenue), 12 February 1927)
- Lowest home attendance: 2,385 (vs Tranmere Rovers, 7 May 1927)
- Average home league attendance: 6,080
Home colours

The 1926–27 season was the 46th season in the history of Nelson Football Club and their sixth campaign as a professional club in the Football League. Nelson ended the season with a record of 22 wins, 7 draws and 13 defeats, helping the team to a total of 51 points. The team started the campaign well—winning six of the first nine matches—and lost only three matches during the first five months of the campaign. In the 1926–27 season, Nelson recorded several large victories, including a 7–0 win over Accrington Stanley and a 7–1 defeat of Crewe Alexandra. Nelson were consistently near the top of the league table throughout the campaign, but were never able to supplant Stoke City from the top position, and a run of six consecutive losses at the end of the season saw them finish in fifth-place in the league.

In addition to the league campaign, Nelson also entered the FA Cup and reached the second round for the first time in their history, beating Stockport County in the first round before being knocked out by Ashington. Nelson used 24 different players during the season, many of whom had also played for the club during the previous campaign. Forwards Jimmy Hampson and Buchanan Sharp were the top goalscorers in the league, each scoring 23 goals, with Hampson's two strikes in the Cup giving him a total of 25. No player appeared in all 44 competitive matches; former England international George Wilson played the highest number of matches with 42 appearances. The highest attendance of the season at the club's Seedhill stadium was 12,415 for the 1–0 win over Bradford (Park Avenue) on 12 February 1927, while the lowest gate was 2,385 for the final game of the season against Tranmere Rovers.

== Football League Third Division North ==
=== Key ===
- H = Home match
- A = Away match
- In Result column, Nelson's score shown first
- Goalscorers shown in order of first goal scored

=== Match results ===
Date	Opponents	Result	Goalscorers	Attendance
28 August 1926	Wigan Borough (A)	1–2	Sharp	6,788
4 September 1926	Doncaster Rovers (H)	5–1	Earle (3), Bottrill, Stevenson	6,982
11 September 1926	Stoke City (A)	1–4	Sharp	11,199
13 September 1926	Ashington (H)	4–0	Earle, Sharp (2), Bottrill	5,595
15 September 1926	New Brighton (H)	2–0	Sharp (2)	5,244
18 September 1926	Rotherham United (H)	5–3	Baker (2), Bottrill, Sharp, Stevenson	6,395
25 September 1926	Bradford (Park Avenue) (A)	2–2	Earle, Bottrill	11,992
2 October 1926	Walsall (H)	3–2	Sharp, Stevenson, Earle	6,295
9 October 1926	Lincoln City (A)	4–1	Harris, Stevenson, Hampson, Earle	4,920
16 October 1926	Durham City (A)	1–1	Baker	5,517
23 October 1926	Accrington Stanley (A)	5–0	Hoad (2), Stevenson (2), Sharp	6,804
30 October 1926	Halifax Town (H)	0–0		7,316
6 November 1926	Barrow (A)	1–0	Stevenson	3,526
13 November 1926	Crewe Alexandra (H)	7–1	Hampson (4), Stevenson, Baker, Sharp	4,149
20 November 1926	Hartlepools United (A)	2–3	Sharp, Hampson	3,171
4 December 1926	Southport (A)	4–3	Hampson (2), Wilson, Earle	4,438
18 December 1926	Tranmere Rovers (A)	3–2	Hampson, Stevenson, Sharp	3,970
27 December 1926	Wrexham (A)	2–2	Sharp (2)	10,362
1 January 1927	Wrexham (H)	3–0	Stevenson (2), Sharp	6,485
8 January 1927	Stockport County (H)	6–1	Hampson (3), Keers, Sharp (2)	4,129
15 January 1927	Wigan Borough (H)	4–0	Baker, Sharp, Keers, Hampson	5,205
22 January 1927	Doncaster Rovers (A)	0–6		4,977
29 January 1927	Stoke City (H)	1–0	Sharp	9,974
5 February 1927	Rotherham United (A)	3–2	Sharp, Hampson, Keers	4,345
12 February 1927	Bradford (Park Avenue) (H)	1–0	Baker	12,415
19 February 1927	Walsall (A)	1–4	Sharp	3,498
26 February 1927	Lincoln City (H)	2–1	Stevenson (2), Sharp	5,784
5 March 1927	Durham City (A)	3–3	Hampson (2), Sharp	1,135
12 March 1927	Accrington Stanley (H)	7–0	Hampson (3), Bedford (2), Wilson, White	7,046
19 March 1927	Halifax Town (A)	1–4	White	13,602
23 March 1927	Ashington (A)	1–1	White	1,047
26 March 1927	Barrow (H)	3–0	Hampson, White, Bedford	3,668
2 April 1927	Crewe Alexandra (A)	1–2	Stevenson	5,225
5 April 1927	Rochdale (H)	3–1	Hampson (2), White	5,871
9 April 1927	Hartlepools United (H)	6–2	White (3), Hampson, Stevenson, Wilson	4,369
15 April 1927	Chesterfield (A)	1–1	Bedford	12,744
16 April 1927	Stockport County (H)	1–4	Wilson	10,546
18 April 1927	Chesterfield (H)	0–3		6,699
23 April 1927	Southport (H)	1–2	Stevenson	3,473
27 April 1927	New Brighton (A)	2–7	Stevenson (2)	3,104
30 April 1927	Rochdale (A)	1–2	Wilson	3,871
5 May 1927	Tranmere Rovers (H)	0–2		2,385

=== Final league position ===
Pos	Team	Pld	W	D	L	GF	GA	GAv	Pts
3	Bradford Park Avenue	42	24	7	11	101	59	1.712	55
4	Halifax Town	42	21	11	10	70	53	1.321	53
5	Nelson	42	22	7	13	104	75	1.387	51
6	Stockport County	42	22	7	13	93	69	1.348	49 (Note: Stockport County had two points deducted for fielding Joe Smith without FA permission on 26 March 1927.)
7	Chesterfield	42	21	5	16	92	68	1.353	47

Source: rsssf.com

== FA Cup ==
=== Key ===
- H = Home match
- A = Away match
- In Result column, Nelson's score shown first
- Goalscorers shown in order of first goal scored

=== Match results ===
Round	Date	Opponents	Result	Goalscorers	Attendance
First round	27 November 1926	Stockport County (H)	4–1	Hampson (2), Sharp, Stevenson	8,757
Second round	11 December 1926	Ashington (A)	1–2	Stevenson	5,265

== Player statistics ==
Key to positions

- CF = Centre forward
- FB = Fullback
- GK = Goalkeeper
- HB = Half-back
- IF = Inside forward
- OF = Outside forward

Statistics

Nat.	Position	Player	Third Division North		FA Cup		Total
Nat.	Position	Player	Apps	Goals	Apps	Goals	Apps	Goals
(England)	GK	Harry Abbott	35	0	2	0	37	0
(England)	HB	Frank Bailey	3	0	0	0	3	0
(England)	HB	Jim Baker	28	6	2	0	30	6
(England)	OF	Lewis Bedford	14	4	0	0	14	4
(England)	IF	Billy Bottrill	19	4	2	0	21	4
(England)	FB	Fred Broadhurst	24	0	1	0	25	0
(England)	OF	John Brown	2	0	0	0	2	0
(England)	OF	Edwin Earle	17	8	2	0	19	8
(England)	CF	Jimmy Hampson	35	23	2	2	37	25
(England)	HB	Ambrose Harris	20	1	0	0	20	1
(England)	OF	Sid Hoad	26	2	0	0	26	2
(England)	FB	John Keers	8	3	0	0	8	3
(England)	GK	Fred Mace	7	0	0	0	7	0
(England)	HB	Ronald Mitchell	32	0	2	0	34	0
(Scotland)	FB	James Pearson	23	0	1	0	24	0
(England)	CF	Thomas Pickering	1	0	0	0	1	0
(England)	FB	Clement Rigg	37	0	2	0	39	0
(Wales)	CF	Percy Roberts	1	0	0	0	1	0
(Scotland)	IF	Buchanan Sharp	35	23	2	1	37	24
(England)	HB	Edwin Simpson	2	0	0	0	2	0
(Scotland)	IF	John Stevenson	35	17	2	2	37	19
(England)	OF	Harold Taylor	5	0	0	0	5	0
(England)	IF	Henry White	13	8	0	0	13	8
(England)	HB	George Wilson	40	5	2	0	42	5

== See also ==
- List of Nelson F.C. seasons
