= Ron Mitchell =

Ron, Ronald or Ronnie Mitchell may refer to:

== Sportspeople ==
- Fang Mitchell (born 1948 as Ronald L. Mitchell), American college basketball coach
- Ron Mitchell (coach) (born 1938), American football and basketball coach
- Ronald Mitchell (1902 – after 1930), English footballer

== Others ==
- Andrew Ronald Mitchell (1921–2007), British mathematician
- Ronnie Mitchell, fictional female character in EastEnders

== See also ==
- Mitchell (surname)
