= Sam Warhurst =

English footballer

Personal information
- Full name: Samuel Lee Warhurst
- Date of birth: 29 December 1907
- Place of birth: Nelson, England
- Date of death: 17 February 1981 (aged 73)
- Place of death: Southampton, England
- Height: 5 ft 8 in (1.73 m)
- Position: Goalkeeper

Senior career*
Years	Team	Apps	(Gls)
1926–1931	Nelson	76	(0)
1931–1932	Stalybridge Celtic		
1932–1937	Bradford City	66	(0)
1937–1939	Southampton	81	(0)
- * Club domestic league appearances and goals

Samuel Lee Warhurst (29 December 1907 – 17 February 1981) was an English professional footballer who played as a goalkeeper. He started his career with Football League Third Division North club Nelson, where he made 76 league appearances in five seasons. After a short spell in non-League football with Stalybridge Celtic, Warhurst returned to professional football with Bradford City in 1932 and spent five years with the Yorkshire club. He ended his playing career with Southampton, playing his final league match in 1939. He later assisted the club in a non-playing role. In later life, he worked as a hotelier in Southampton.

== Biography ==
Warhurst was born in the town of Nelson, Lancashire, on 29 December 1907. He lived in the town until his transfer away from the local club in 1931. In later life he lived in Southampton on the south coast of England, where he owned the St. Mary's Hotel. When the hotel was demolished in 1972 to build a shopping centre, Warhurst took retirement. He died in Southampton on 17 February 1981, at the age of 73.

== Football career ==
=== Nelson ===
Warhurst was signed as an amateur by Football League Third Division North club Nelson in October 1926 after playing for the local British Legion team. He spent the 1926–27 season in the reserve team as an understudy to Fred Mace, playing six matches in the Lancashire Combination. At the start of the following campaign, Warhurst was offered his first professional contract by Nelson following the departure of Mace to Macclesfield Town. He made his first senior appearance for the club on 24 September 1927 in the 2–1 win against Durham City at Seedhill, taking the place of John Stoneham who had kept goal in the first five games of the season. Warhurst retained his starting place for the following two matches as Nelson suffered consecutive away defeats at Barrow and Wrexham, before being replaced by William Bossons for the visit of Chesterfield on 8 October 1927. He went on to make 31 league appearances during the 1927–28 campaign, keeping three clean sheets but conceding 102 goals. Nelson suffered several heavy defeats throughout the season, losing by eight goals against both Bradford City and Stockport County; their total of 136 goals conceded remains the second-highest ever in a Football League season.

Bossons and Stoneham were among those released by Nelson in 1928, and Des Fawcett was brought in from Darlington to compete with Warhurst for the goalkeeper position. The new arrival started the 1928–29 season as first choice, playing the first 13 matches. Warhurst made his first appearance of the season in the 0–1 away defeat by Wigan Borough on 3 November 1928. He kept goal in three consecutive Nelson wins the following month, and missed only one match in four months. Warhurst played 19 times before Fawcett regained the goalkeeper's jersey for the last nine games of the campaign.

Warhurst was selected for the first game of the 1929–30 season, a 2–2 home draw with Southport on 31 August 1929. He was one of four goalkeepers to appear in the opening four games of the campaign, along with James Mangham and new arrivals Lewis Botto and Peter Shevlin. Neither Mangham nor Botto ever played for Nelson again, but Shevlin kept his place in the team for most of the remainder of the season, and Warhurst was restricted to only three games. He left the club temporarily in the summer of 1930 but returned in October of the same year and made his first appearance of the new season in the 0–2 loss away at Doncaster Rovers on 11 October 1930. Over the rest of the season Warhurst played 24 times for the first team, sharing goalkeeping duties with Shevlin and Charlie Hillam, who made 18 and 3 appearances respectively. Warhurst was selected in the starting line-up for Nelson's last ever game in the Third Division North, a 0–4 defeat to Hull City on 2 May 1931.

=== Later career ===
Following Nelson's unsuccessful re-election to the Football League in 1931, many of the playing staff left the club. Warhurst was among them, signing with Cheshire County League side Stalybridge Celtic. He spent one year with Stalybridge, helping the team to a third-placed finish, their highest for eight seasons. In June 1932, Warhurst was signed by Football League Second Division outfit Bradford City on a free transfer. He remained with the club until the end of the 1936–37 season, making a total of 66 league appearances.

He remained in the Second Division after leaving Bradford, signing with Southampton in May 1937, where he replaced the recently retired Bert Scriven. Warhurst became the first-choice goalkeeper over the next two seasons, playing 81 league games for the club in total. The outbreak of the Second World War necessitated the abandonment of the 1939–40 season after three matches, signalling the end of Warhurst's professional career. However, he continued to play for Southampton in the Wartime Leagues. During the war, he also played on occasions for the Cunliffe-Owen Aircraft works team based at Eastleigh. Described as "on the small side", Warhurst was a "sound 'keeper with a fine reputation for sportsmanship and comradeship".

Warhurst remained with Southampton in a non-playing capacity after the war, being appointed as a first-team trainer–coach in March 1946. He assisted the club for several seasons before leaving following relegation from the Second Division at the end of the 1952–53 campaign.
