= Ruffell =

Ruffell is a surname. Notable people with the surname include:

- Bill Ruffell, English footballer
- Charles Ruffell, British athlete
- H. P. Ruffell Smith, British physicist
- Jimmy Ruffell, English footballer
- Ralph Ruffell, English footballer
- Suzi Ruffell, British comedian, writer, and actress

== See also ==
- George Ruffell Memorial Shield
