= Percy Roberts =

Percy Roberts may refer to:

- Percy Roberts (Australian footballer) (1909 - 1943), Australian rules footballer
- Percy Roberts (Welsh footballer), Welsh association footballer
