= William Donkin =

William Donkin may refer to:

- William Fishburn Donkin (1814–1869), astronomer and mathematician
- Billy Donkin (1900–1974), English footballer

== See also ==
- Donkin (surname)
