= A. R. Mitchell =

A. R. Mitchell may refer to:

- Arthur Roy Mitchell (1889–1977), American painter
- Andrew Ronald Mitchell (1921–2007), British mathematician
