= Donkin =

Donkin may refer to:

- Donkin, Nova Scotia, an unincorporated community in Nova Scotia
- Donkin (surname), the English-language surname
- Mount Donkin, a mountain in British Columbia
