= Mangham =

Mangham may refer to:

- Mangham, Louisiana
- Jaden Mangham, American football player
- James Mangham, English footballer
- Randal Mangham, American politician
- USS George Mangham (1854)
