= George Spence (footballer, born 1904) =

English footballer

Personal information
- Full name: George Robert Spence
- Date of birth: 6 April 1904
- Place of birth: Burnley, England
- Date of death: Unknown
- Position: Outside forward

Senior career*
Years	Team	Apps	(Gls)
	Colne Town	?	(?)
1927–1928	Nelson	13	(2)
1928–1929	Rossendale United	?	(?)
1929	Great Harwood	?	(?)
- * Club domestic league appearances and goals

George Robert Spence (born 6 April 1904, date of death unknown) was an English professional footballer who played as an outside forward. Born in Burnley, he started his career in local-league football with Colne Town. On 8 October 1927, Spence signed as an amateur with Football League Third Division North side Nelson and made his debut for the club in the 3–3 draw with Chesterfield later the same day alongside fellow new signing, goalkeeper William Bossons. He was awarded a professional contract two weeks later and went on to keep his place in the starting eleven for the following seven matches. Spence scored his first goal in senior football in the 4–2 win against Hartlepools United at Seedhill on 5 November 1927, a match which also featured a hat-trick from centre forward Buchanan Sharp.

Spence scored his second goal for Nelson in the 1–5 home defeat to Ashington at the beginning of December, but was dropped for the following game, with Bill Ruffell being chosen to play at outside right against Wigan Borough. After spending five weeks out of the team, he returned to the starting line-up for the first home match of 1928, a 6–3 victory over Rochdale. He played at inside right the following week in place of Billy Bottrill, but was again dropped after the side suffered a 1–5 defeat away at Halifax Town. Spence made only three further appearances during the remainder of the season, and played his last game for Nelson on 14 April 1928 as the team lost 1–5 to Ashington for the second time in the campaign. Nelson finished bottom of the Third Division North in 1928 and although their application for re-election to the Football League was successful many of the playing staff, including Spence, left the club that summer.

After leaving Nelson, Spence returned to non-league football, initially with Lancashire Combination outfit Rossendale United. He went on to join Great Harwood in January 1929 and spent nine months there before moving back into amateur football. Over the next four years, he played for a number of local teams in Burnley including B. Thornber's Sports, A. Cuerdale's Mill and Accrington Road Unity, before retiring from football in the mid-1930s.
