= David McClure =

David McClure may refer to:

- David McClure (footballer), Scottish professional footballer
- David McClure (artist) (1926–1998), Scottish artist
- Dave McClure, American entrepreneur
- David McClure (basketball), American basketball coach and former player

== See also ==
- David Brinkley (David McClure Brinkley, 1920–2003), American broadcaster
