= John Stoneham =

John Stoneham may refer to:

- John Stoneham (baseball)
- John Stoneham (footballer)
