= West Melton =

Village in South Yorkshire, England

Coordinates: 53.503516°N 1.361768°W

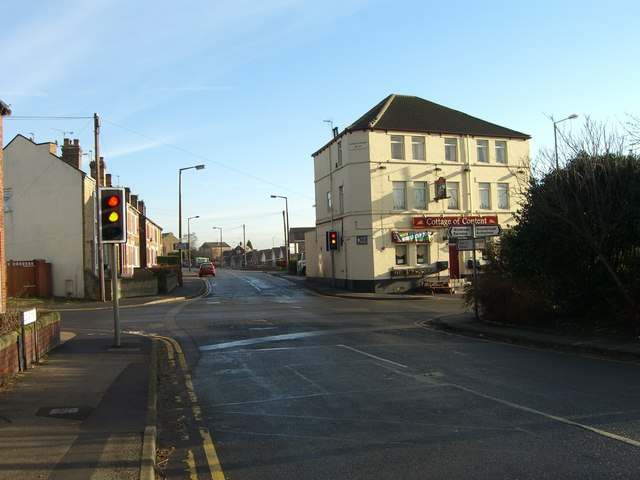

- Location within South Yorkshire
- Population: 3,007 (2001)
- OS grid reference: SE425005
- Metropolitan borough: Rotherham
- Metropolitan county: South Yorkshire
- Region: Yorkshire and the Humber
- Country: England
- Sovereign state: United Kingdom
- Post town: ROTHERHAM
- Postcode district: S63
- Dialling code: 01709
- Police: South Yorkshire
- Fire: South Yorkshire
- Ambulance: Yorkshire
- UK Parliament: Wentworth

West Melton is a former mining village in the Rotherham district, in South Yorkshire, England. It lies between Wath upon Dearne and Brampton Bierlow, roughly 5 miles north of Rotherham and 5 miles south-east of Barnsley. It contains several churches, among them are West Melton United Reformed Church and Princess Street Methodist Church. Until 1974 it was in the West Riding of Yorkshire.

== History ==
On 31 December 1894 West Melton became a civil parish, formed from Brampton Bierlow, on 1 April 1923 the parish was abolished and merged with Wath upon Dearne. In 1921 the parish had a population of 4745. It is now in the unparished area of Wath upon Dearne.

=== National Grid history ===
A 163 ton transformer was taken to the electrical substation, from English Electric at Stafford in December 1952. The first 42 miles of 275kW supergrid pylons to Staythorpe Power Station, in Nottinghamshire, opened on 15 July 1953.

The pylons were built by Blaw-Knox.

== Notable people ==
- Bernard Radford (1908–1986), footballer

== See also ==
- Listed buildings in Rotherham (Hoober Ward)
