= Edwin Simpson =

English footballer

Personal information
- Date of birth: 21 January 1909
- Place of birth: Chilton, England
- Date of death: 31 August 1973 (aged 64)
- Place of death: Bishop Middleham, England
- Height: 5 ft 7 1/2 in (1.71 m)
- Position: Left-half

Senior career*
Years	Team	Apps	(Gls)
1927–1928	Nelson	17	(0)
1928–1929	Crewe Alexandra	0	(0)
	Craghead United	?	(?)
	South Moor Colliery	?	(?)
- * Club domestic league appearances and goals

Edwin Simpson (21 January 1909 – 31 August 1973) was an English professional footballer who played as a left-half. Born in Chilton, County Durham, he played 17 matches in the Football League for Nelson and also had spells in non-League football.

== Career ==
Simpson started his career in senior football as an amateur with Chilton Colliery Railway Athletic in October 1926. In March of the following year, he was given a trial at Football League First Division side Blackburn Rovers but was deemed to be unready for that standard of football. Blackburn recommended Simpson to local Third Division North club Nelson, who signed the player as a professional on 16 March 1927. He made his league debut on 18 April 1927 in the 0–3 home defeat to Chesterfield, deputising for regular left-half Ronald Mitchell.

Simpson began the 1927–28 campaign as first-choice but was replaced by trialist Alfred Brown after five matches. He returned to the team for a short spell during the middle of the season before losing his left-half berth to new signing Arthur Hepworth. Simpson made his seventeenth and final appearance for Nelson on 16 April 1928, playing as a makeshift centre forward in the 1–4 defeat away at Darlington. Nelson finished bottom of the Third Division North at the end of the campaign and Simpson was one of several players to leave the club during the summer of 1928. He subsequently signed for Crewe Alexandra but failed to make a first-team appearance during his season in Cheshire. Following this unsuccessful spell, Simpson returned to the north-east of England and moved into non-League football, initially with Craghead United before ending his playing career with South Moor Colliery.
