= George Spence =

George Spence may refer to:

- George Spence (Canadian politician) (1880–1975), Canadian provincial and federal politician
- George Spence (MP) (1787–1850), Member of Parliament for Ripon, 1829–1832
- George Spence (footballer, born 1877) (1877–?), Scottish football player for Preston, Southampton and Hull
- George Spence (footballer, born 1904) (1904–?), English football player for Nelson
