= Harry Ridley =

English footballer

Personal information
- Full name: Henry Ridley
- Date of birth: 25 November 1904
- Place of birth: Sunderland, England
- Date of death: 16 March 1989 (aged 84)
- Place of death: Fulwell, England
- Position: Outside forward

Senior career*
Years	Team	Apps	(Gls)
- Spennymoor United
19xx–1928	Aldershot		
1928–1929	Nelson	31	(7)
1929–1930	West Stanley	?	(?)
1930–1931	Workington	?	(?)
1931–1933	Spennymoor United	?	(?)
1933–1934	Blyth Spartans	?	(?)
1934	Murton Colliery Welfare	?	(?)
1934–19xx	Spennymoor United	?	(?)
- * Club domestic league appearances and goals

Henry Ridley (25 November 1904 – 16 March 1989) was an English professional footballer who played as an outside forward. He spent the majority of his career in non-League football, but made 31 appearances in the Football League for Nelson during the 1928–29 season.

== Biography ==
Harry Ridley was born in Sunderland, County Durham, on 25 November 1904. He resided in the area for most of his life and died in Fulwell, a suburb of Sunderland, on 16 March 1989 at the age of 84.

== Career ==
Ridley began his career in non-League football with Spennymoor United in the mid-1920s. In 1926, he had a trial with Football League Second Division side Fulham, but was not offered a professional deal and went to play in the Southern Football League with Aldershot.

In July 1928, he was signed by Nelson of the Third Division North to replace Bill Slack, who had left the club at the end of the previous season. Ridley scored on his Nelson debut, playing at outside-left in the 2–2 draw with Hartlepools United on 28 August 1928. He retained his place in the starting line-up until the end of November, scoring further goals against Wrexham and Crewe Alexandra. During the second half of the 1928–29 campaign, Ridley found his appearances limited as he shared the outside-left position with Tom Carmedy and Jack Fletcher. On 2 March 1929, he scored the only goal of the game as Nelson beat Carlisle United at Seedhill. In total, Ridley scored 7 goals in 31 league matches for the Lancashire club, netting his last goal in the final match of the season, a 4–4 draw with Accrington Stanley. At the end of the season only nine first-team players were retained and Ridley was one of those to leave Nelson, returning to non-League football with West Stanley.

After spending a year with West Stanley, Ridley joined North Eastern League side Workington in August 1930. The following year he returned to Spennymoor United, where he remained for two seasons. Ridley transferred to Blyth Spartans in July 1933 and later had a spell with Murton Colliery Welfare, before returning to Spennymoor for a third time in December 1934.
