= John Dodsworth =

John Dodsworth may refer to:

- John Dodsworth (footballer)
- John Dodsworth (actor)
