= Fred Broadhurst =

English footballer

Personal information
- Full name: Frederick Broadhurst
- Date of birth: 30 November 1888
- Place of birth: Hindley, England
- Date of death: 9 May 1953 (aged 64)
- Place of death: Aspull, England
- Height: 5 ft 8 in (1.73 m)
- Position: Full-back

Youth career
- Hindley Central

Senior career*
| Years | Team | Apps | (Gls) |
| 1910–1922 | Preston North End | 107 | (3) |
| 1913 | → Hindley Central (loan) | ? | (?) |
| 1922–1923 | Stalybridge Celtic | 36 | (0) |
| 1923–1924 | Stockport County | 4 | (0) |
| 1924–1925 | Barrow | 38 | (0) |
| 1925–1927 | Nelson | 61 | (0) |
| 1927–1928 | Chorley | 9 | (0?) |
- * Club domestic league appearances and goals

Frederick Broadhurst (30 November 1888 – 9 May 1953) was an English professional footballer who played as a full-back. In a career spanning almost 20 years, he made almost 250 appearances in the Football League for five different clubs.

== Early life ==
Born in Hindley, Lancashire, as a youth Broadhurst played for his hometown club, Hindley Central, before joining Football League side Preston North End in April 1910.

== Career ==
He signed his first professional contract with North End in August of the same year and went on to make two league appearances during the 1910–11 season. Broadhurst returned to Hindley Central on loan in March 1913, before his career was interrupted by the outbreak of the First World War, which halted all competitive football in England for four seasons between 1915 and 1919. Upon the recommencement of League football in 1919–20, Broadhurst was awarded £400 (equivalent to £15,000 in 2025) by Preston for completing ten seasons with the team.

In the summer of 1922, having played 107 league matches and scored 3 goals for North End, Broadhurst moved to Stalybridge Celtic, who had joined the Football League the previous year following the formation of the Third Division North. He missed only two matches of the 1922–23 campaign, making 36 league appearances for the side as they finished 11th in the league. However, Stalybridge left the League at the end of the season, and Broadhurst subsequently moved to Second Division outfit Stockport County. He did not feature regularly with his new club, however, and played only four matches for them. A return to the Third Division North with Barrow followed in June 1924, and Broadhurst was almost ever-present during the 1924–25 season as the side ended the campaign in 14th position.

Broadhurst joined Nelson in June 1925 and made his debut for the club on 29 August 1925 in the 2–1 win against Crewe Alexandra at Seedhill. He retained his place in the starting eleven for some time, playing in 36 competitive league matches before being replaced by Walter Chadwick for the 0–3 loss to Grimsby Town on 17 April 1926. Throughout the 1926–27 campaign, Broadhurst shared right-back duties with Clement Rigg and James Pearson. His final appearance for Nelson came on 7 May 1927, in the 0–2 defeat at home to Tranmere Rovers. He left the club at the end of the season and, at the age of 38, moved into non-league football with Chorley of the Lancashire Combination.
