= John Keers =

English footballer

John Mandell Keers
Personal information
- Full name: John Mandell Keers
- Date of birth: 6 March 1901
- Place of birth: Tow Law, England
- Date of death: 5 January 1963 (aged 61)
- Place of death: Hyde, England
- Position: Outside forward

Senior career*
| Years | Team | Apps | (Gls) |
| 1924 | Langley Park | | |
| 1924–1925 | Tow Law Town | | |
| 1925–1926 | Hull City | 8 | (1) |
| 1926 | Annfield Plain | | |
| 1926–1927 | Nelson | 8 | (3) |
| 1927–1928 | Boston Town | | |
| 1928–1929 | Macclesfield | 30 | (6) |
| 1929–1938 | Hyde United | ? | (?) |
- * Club domestic league appearances and goals

John Mandell Keers (6 March 1901 – 5 January 1963) was an English professional footballer who played as an outside forward. Born in Tow Law, he played in the Football League for Hull City and Nelson, as well as representing several semi-professional clubs.

== Biography ==
Keers was born on 6 March 1901 in Tow Law, County Durham. Before playing professional football, he worked as a coal miner at Chopwell Colliery. After leaving Hyde United in 1938, he continued to live in the town of Hyde, Cheshire. Keers died in Hyde on 5 January 1963, at the age of 62.

== Football career ==
=== Early career ===
Keers began his football career as an amateur with Langley Park in August 1924. He transferred to his hometown club Tow Law Town in November of the same year and was part of the team that won the Northern Football League title in the 1924–25 season. In May 1925, Keers was signed by Football League Second Division side Hull City. He played eight matches and scored one goal for Hull before moving back into non-league football with Annfield Plain in the summer of 1926.

=== Nelson and later career ===
Keers spent five months with Annfield Plain before moving to Football League Third Division North club Nelson for a transfer fee of £150 in December 1926. He was signed to replace Edwin Earle, who had recently been transferred to Burnley for a four-figure sum. Keers made his Nelson debut on 1 January 1927 in the 3–0 win against Wrexham at Seedhill. The local newspaper, the Nelson Leader, was pleased with his first performance for the club and he kept his place in the team for the following match against Stockport County. He scored in a 6–1 victory for Nelson, before netting again in the 4–0 defeat of Wigan Borough a week later. Keers scored his third goal for the club in the 3–2 win away at Rotherham United on 5 February 1927. He played a total of eight matches for Nelson, with the team winning six of those games. In March 1927, Nelson signed outside-left Lewis Bedford from Walsall and Keers found himself out of the team. He was released in the summer of 1927 and joined Boston Town, where he spent the following two seasons. Keers signed for Hyde United in 1929 and played for the club until his retirement in 1938.
