= Walter Chadwick =

English footballer

Personal information
- Full name: Walter Russell Chadwick
- Date of birth: 12 December 1903
- Place of birth: Accrington, Lancashire, England
- Date of death: 20 October 1966 (aged 62)
- Place of death: Nelson, England
- Height: 5 ft 10 in (1.78 m)
- Position: Defender

Senior career*
| Years | Team | Apps | (Gls) |
| 1923–1924 | Burnley | 0 | (0) |
| 1924 | Barnoldswick Town | ? | (?) |
| 1924–1925 | Burnley | 0 | (0) |
| 1925–1927 | Nelson | 2 | (0) |
| 1927–1928 | Darwen | ? | (?) |
- * Club domestic league appearances and goals

Walter Russell Chadwick (12 December 1903 – 20 October 1966) was an English professional footballer who played as a defender. Born in Accrington, Lancashire in 1903, Chadwick started his career in local football with St Saviour's of Bacup before joining Football League First Division side Burnley as an amateur in 1923. He failed to make a first-team appearance and left the following summer, signing with Barnoldswick Town in June 1924. Two months later, Chadwick returned to Burnley on professional terms but again could not break into the senior team and played solely in the reserves.

In August 1925, Chadwick was signed by Third Division North outfit Nelson. He became a regular fixture in the club's reserves, forming a defensive partnership with James Pearson, who also went on to represent the Nelson first team. Chadwick made his Football League debut on 17 April 1926, playing at right-back in the 0–3 defeat away to Grimsby Town. He also appeared in the following game three days later, a 3–3 draw with Chesterfield at Seedhill. He returned to the reserves for the 1926–27 season. The second string won 27 of their 38 league matches during the campaign, and were crowned champions of the Lancashire Combination for the first time.

Chadwick left Nelson in the 1927 close season and transferred to Darwen, who played in the Lancashire Combination. During his only season with the club, the team conceded 104 league goals and finished second-bottom of the division, forcing them to apply for re-election. In the summer of 1928, Chadwick quit Darwen and retired from football. He died in the town of Nelson on 20 October 1966, at the age of 62.
