= Walter Hepworth =

English footballer

Personal information
- Full name: Walter Hepworth
- Date of birth: 4 October 1878
- Place of birth: Dodworth, England
- Date of death: 1965 (aged 86–87)
- Position: Inside right

Senior career*
Years	Team	Apps	(Gls)
189?–1896	Worsbrough Common St Luke's		
1896–1900	Barnsley	26	(9)
- * Club domestic league appearances and goals

Walter Hepworth (4 October 1878 – 1965) was an English professional footballer who scored 9 goals from 26 appearances in the Football League playing at inside right for Barnsley. He had two sons who played league football: Arthur played for Nelson in the late 1920s and Ronnie made more than 100 appearances for Bradford (Park Avenue) in the years following the Second World War.
