= Listed buildings in Brampton Bierlow =

Brampton Bierlow is a civil parish in the Metropolitan Borough of Rotherham, South Yorkshire, England. The parish contains two listed buildings that are recorded in the National Heritage List for England. Of these, one is listed at Grade II*, the middle of the three grades, and the other is at Grade II, the lowest grade. The parish contains the village of Brampton Bierlow, and the listed buildings consist of a manor house converted into a public house, and the former northern entrance to the grounds of Wentworth Woodhouse

== Key ==
Grade	Criteria
II*	Particularly important buildings of more than special interest
II	Buildings of national importance and special interest

== Buildings ==
Name and location	Photograph	Date	Notes	Grade
Brampton Hall; 53.50610°N 1.37466°W		c. 1500	A manor house with a timber framed core, later encased in stone and converted into a public house. The external walls are in sandstone, and the building has quoins, an eaves band, and a tile roof. There are two storeys and a cruciform plan, consisting of a range of three bays, a rear wing, and a cross-wing. The windows have lintels grooved as voussoirs, and on the rear wing is applied timber framing and reproduction mullioned windows. Inside, there is exposed timber framing.	II
Rainborough Lodges and gates 53.50076°N 1.38714°W		1798	The former north entrance to the Wentworth Woodhouse estate consists of a pair of lodges, a gate, and piers. The lodges are in sandstone on a plinth, with quoins, a modillion cornice, and hipped Welsh slate roofs. Each lodge is square with two storeys, and on the inner return is a doorway in a round-arched recess, with an architrave, a frieze, and a pediment. In the outer wall is a round-headed sash window with a moulded impost and archivolt, a round-arched recess with a Greek key impost band, an archivolt, and a frieze with festooned paterae. The inner wing walls contain a round-arch[ed doorway, and link to gate piers each of which is rusticated, and has a Greek key band, a frieze with swags and paterae, and a cornice, and is surmounted by a lion couchant. The gates are in wrought iron, and have decorative scrollwork and a vase finial. The outer wings contain a blind round-arched opening, and end in rusticated piers.	II*
