= James Sharp (footballer, born 1870) =

Scottish footballer

Personal information
- Full name: James Sharp
- Date of birth: 12 February 1870
- Place of birth: Bonhill, Scotland
- Positions: Forward; wing half

Senior career*
Years	Team	Apps	(Gls)
1889–1891	Vale of Leven	11	(0)
1891–1895	Preston North End	93	(3)
1896–1897	Darwen	24	(2)
- * Club domestic league appearances and goals

James Sharp (12 February 1870 – unknown) was a Scottish footballer who played in the Football League for Darwen and Preston North End, and in the Scottish Football League for Vale of Leven (also appearing for them on the losing side in the 1890 Scottish Cup Final).

His nephew Buchanan Sharp was also a footballer.
