= Robert Ferguson (footballer, born 1908) =

English footballer

Personal information
- Full name: Robert Ferguson
- Date of birth: April quarter 1908
- Place of birth: Seaton Burn, England
- Date of death: Unknown
- Height: 5 ft 9 in (1.75 m)
- Position: Inside forward

Senior career*
Years	Team	Apps	(Gls)
1926	Ashington	0	(0)
1926–1927	West Bromwich Albion	0	(0)
1927–1928	Blyth Spartans	?	(?)
1928–1929	Annfield Plain	?	(?)
1929	Nelson	1	(0)
1929–1931	Annfield Plain	?	(?)
1931–1933	Jarrow	?	(?)
- * Club domestic league appearances and goals

Robert Ferguson (born April quarter 1908, date of death unknown) was an English professional footballer who played as an inside forward. He played a single match in the Football League for Nelson. His brother, Ted, also played football for Nelson and Ashington.
