= Wigan A.F.C. =

Former association football club

Wigan
- Full name: Wigan Association Football Club
- Nicknames: the Poolstockers, the Wiganers, The Colliers
- Founded: 1883
- Dissolved: 1888
- Ground: West End, Park Ground, Honeysuckle Ground
- Chairman: G. H. Sowter
- Hon. Secretary: Fred Baldwin
| to Oct 1885 colours | from Oct 1885 colours |

Wigan Association Football Club was the first association football club in Wigan, Lancashire, active in the 1880s.

== History ==
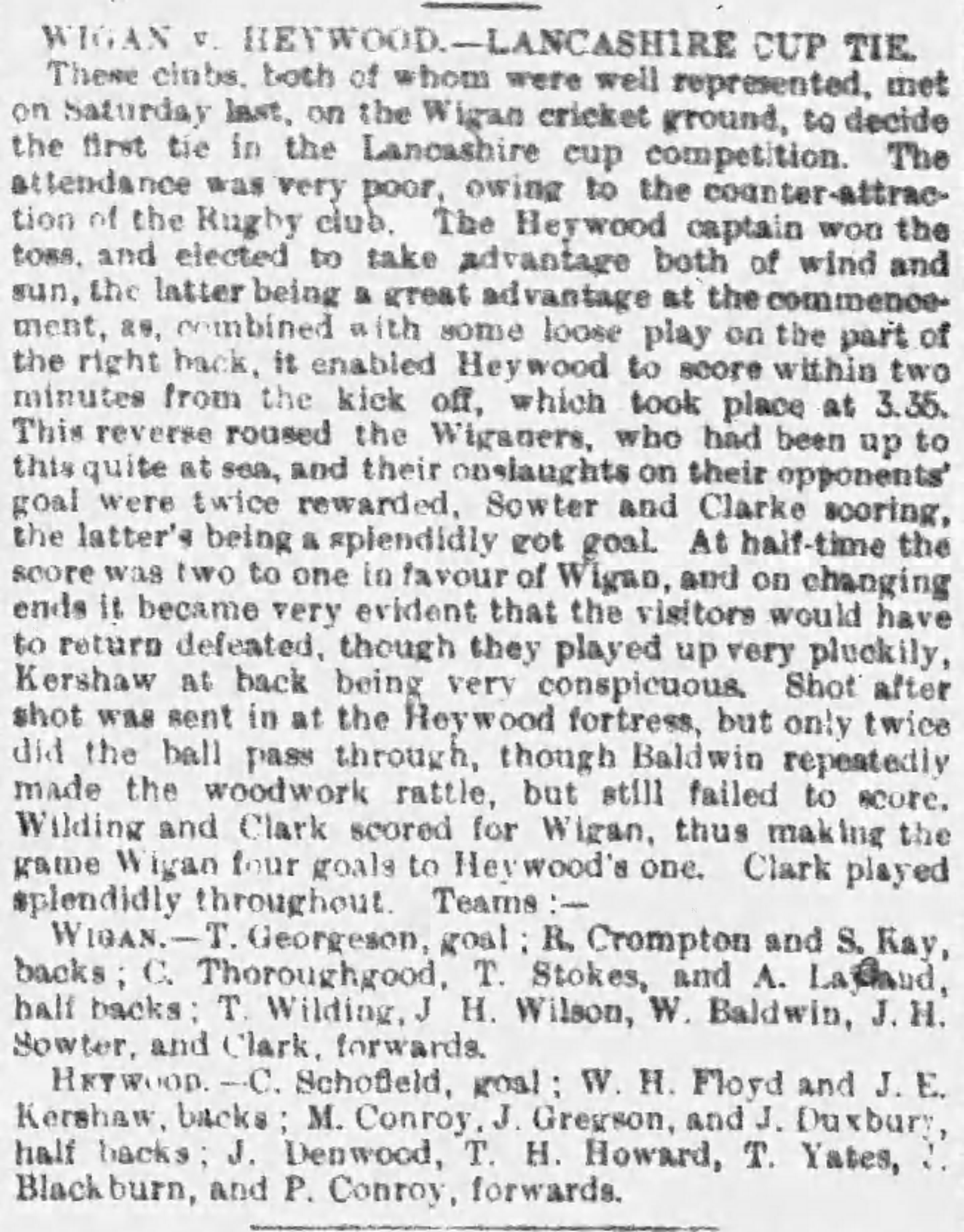
1884–85 Lancashire Senior Cup first round, Wigan 4–1 Heywood, Liverpool Daily Post, 7 October 1884

Wigan A.F.C. was formed in 1883, as an offshoot of the Wigan Cricket Club, and its first match was a 1–0 defeat to Hindley in October 1883. At the end of its first season, the club took over the Wigan Parish Church rugby club, whose members switched to the round ball code.

The newly-ambitious club opened its new ground with a friendly between Darwen and Blackburn Rovers in September 1884, the crowd of 2,000 providing the new club with an instant cash fund. It also entered the Lancashire Senior Cup for the first time in the 1884–85 season, and beat Heywood in the first round, although there was already an early sign of issues, as the crowd had been depressed by the Wigan rugby club playing across town on the same day. In the second round the Wiganers lost 8–2 at Accrington Grasshoppers, the defeat being put in part to the narrowness of the Moorhead ground, two key forwards being absent, full-back Crompton having to leave the field through injury when 3–0 down, and a referee allowing four offside goals for the home side.

At the end of its first season, the club was one of those which threatened to split from the Football Association and join the proposed British Football Association, which would allow the professionalism which the FA forbade. However the FA changed its statutes and the BFA's presence was no longer necessary.

The club's best result was a 4–1 win at Darwen Ramblers in the first round of the Senior Cup in 1885–86, the home side apparently reckoning on scoring half-a-dozen in the run-up. However the Wiganers never got to play the second round, being expelled from the competition for refusing to agree the venue with opponent Fishwick Ramblers. The club did have the honour of christening the Gigg Lane ground, being Bury F.C.'s first visitors there in September 1885.

The 1885–86 season also saw the club reach the semi-final of the Wigan Association Cup, and although it lost to Westhoughton in the semi-final, the Wiganers protested against the opponent's professionalism, and the result was reversed. The final, at Wigan's ground, was scheduled to be against Hindley, but the Westhoughton team turned up - in street clothes - and marched onto the pitch before kick-off, and tried to run the ball up to goal, to claim the match. Amidst the confusion, a second kick-off was attempted, but the Westhoughton players joined in again (on the Wigan side), before eventually a stormy match finished with Wigan 2–0 winners, thanks to goals from Mann and captain William Baldwin. However, Westhoughton had appealed against its disqualification, and its appeal was upheld, so the final had to be re-played - between Westhoughton and Hindley.

However, although Wigan had supported professionalism, it had remained amateur, and the gap which had grown was shown by its first round tie at Bolton Wanderers in the 1886–87 Senior Cup, as the home side won 14–0, which remains (as at 2025) its biggest victory.

On 9 December 1887, Baldwin died of injuries received when he was hit by an out-of-control cab some hours earlier. The cab driver, Moses Cuerdon, who had been drinking, was sentenced to serve one month hard labour. The effect of the accident on the club was disastrous - it did not survive into the 1888–89 season, unable to find a new ground, and club members were duly sued for £19 for the cost of putting up match posters.

== Colours ==
The club originally wore cardinal and blue jerseys. In October 1885, the club adopted sky and navy blue vertical stripes, supplied by Jones & Co of King Street, making the club one of the earliest adopters of vertical stripes.

== Ground ==
The club's original ground was the Wigan Cricket Ground (West End) at Prescott Street. In 1884 it moved to a ground behind the Wigan Rectory called The Park Ground, the former Parish Church ground, but returned to the Cricket Ground in 1885 after the vicar opposed the increasing professionalism in the game. At the end of 1885 the club moved to the Honeysuckle Ground.
