= Ronnie Hepworth =

English footballer

Personal information
- Full name: Ronald Hepworth
- Date of birth: 25 January 1919
- Place of birth: Barnsley, England
- Date of death: 26 April 2006 (aged 87)
- Place of death: Harrogate, England
- Height: 5 ft 10 in (1.78 m)
- Position: Full back

Youth career
- Stainborough United

Senior career*
Years	Team	Apps	(Gls)
1935–1939	Chesterfield	0	(0)
1939–1951	Bradford (Park Avenue)	101	(0)
1951–1952	Scarborough		
- * Club domestic league appearances and goals

Ronald Hepworth (25 January 1919 – 26 April 2006) was an English professional footballer who made 101 appearances in the Football League playing as a full back for Bradford (Park Avenue).

== Life and career ==
Hepworth was born in 1919 in Barnsley, which was then in the West Riding of Yorkshire. His father, Walter, played League football for Barnsley in the 1890s and his older brother Arthur played for Nelson in the late 1920s. He played football for local club Stainborough United before signing amateur forms for Chesterfield in December 1935. The club retained his services until 1939, and he played for their reserves – in 1937–38 he made 31 appearances for their Central League team – but could not dislodge Billy Kidd from the first team.

Hepworth signed for Second Division club Bradford (Park Avenue) in May 1939; the fee was reportedly one "which Chesterfield felt they could not turn down". He played all three of their league matches before the competition was suspended for the duration of the Second World War. (Note: Matches played in the abandoned 1939–40 Football League season are conventionally excluded from a player's record by most statistical sources, although Joyce does count them.) During the war Hepworth made guest appearances for clubs including Lincoln City, Notts County and Nottingham Forest. He resumed his Bradford career after the war while training as a schoolteacher. His teaching commitments sometimes made it difficult to maintain a regular place in Bradford's eleven, and over the five post-war seasons he spent with the club, he made 101 league appearances. In 1951, he moved into non-league football with Scarborough.

Hepworth died in Harrogate, North Yorkshire in 2006 at the age of 87.
