= Patrick McDonagh =

Scottish footballer

Personal information
- Full name: Patrick McDonagh
- Date of birth: 5 November 1906
- Place of birth: Partick, Scotland
- Position: Inside forward

Senior career*
Years	Team	Apps	(Gls)
19xx–1926	St Anthony's		
1926–1928	Barnsley	9	(2)
1928	Nelson	5	(0)
1928–19xx	Bangor City		
19xx–1933	Clydebank		
1933–1934	Beith		
1934–1935	Brechin City	27	(7)
1935	Sligo Rovers		
- * Club domestic league appearances and goals

Patrick McDonagh (born 5 November 1906) was a Scottish professional footballer who played as an inside forward. A native of Partick, Glasgow, he started his career in junior football with St Anthony's before moving to England to join Football League Second Division side Barnsley in August 1926. After being restricted to reserve team football for the entirety of the 1926–27 campaign, McDonagh made his professional debut on 24 September 1927, scoring two goals in a 4–2 win at home to Clapton Orient. He made a further eight appearances for the team, before being dropped in early December and despite the sales of fellow forwards Eric Brook and Fred Tilson to Manchester City, McDonagh could not regain his place in the side.

McDonagh subsequently moved to Football League Third Division North outfit Nelson in the summer of 1928 and played his first game for the club in the 1–5 defeat away at Southport on 8 September 1928. During the opening months of the season, he was in competition with fellow Scot Buchanan Sharp for the inside-right position, and never managed to cement a place in the team. McDonagh made his final Nelson appearance on 13 October 1928, in the 3–4 loss to Barrow. In December 1928, he left Nelson and joined Welsh club Bangor City. Some time later, he returned to Scotland with Clydebank, before joining Beith in July 1933. After a year at Beith, he moved to Brechin City. In the summer of 1935, McDonagh had a trial with Workington but was not offered a contract and subsequently had a spell in Ireland with Sligo Rovers. In December 1935, he left Sligo and retired from football.
