= Felix Gillan =

Scottish footballer

Personal information
- Full name: Felix Joseph Gillan
- Date of birth: 1903
- Place of birth: Chelmsford, England
- Date of death: 1986 (aged 82)
- Place of death: Glasgow, Scotland
- Position: Centre-half

Senior career*
Years	Team	Apps	(Gls)
19xx–1925	St Anthony's	?	(?)
1925–19xx	Ayr United	?	(?)
19xx–1928	Queen of the South	?	(?)
1928–1929	Nelson	11	(0)
1929–1932	Raith Rovers	?	(?)
1932–19xx	Galston	?	(?)
- * Club domestic league appearances and goals

Felix Joseph Gillan (1903–1986) was a Scottish professional footballer who played as a centre-half. He played the majority of his career in the Scottish leagues, but made 11 appearances for Football League Third Division North club Nelson in the 1928–29 season.
