= North Meols F.C. =

Former association football club in Lancashire

- Full name: North Meols Football Club
- Nickname: the Meolers
- Founded: 1891
- Dissolved: 1895
- Ground: The Steels
- Chairman: Charles Scarisbrick, J.P.
- Secretary: J. T. Wright
Home colours

North Meols F.C. was an association football club from Southport, now in Merseyside, active in the 1890s.

== History ==
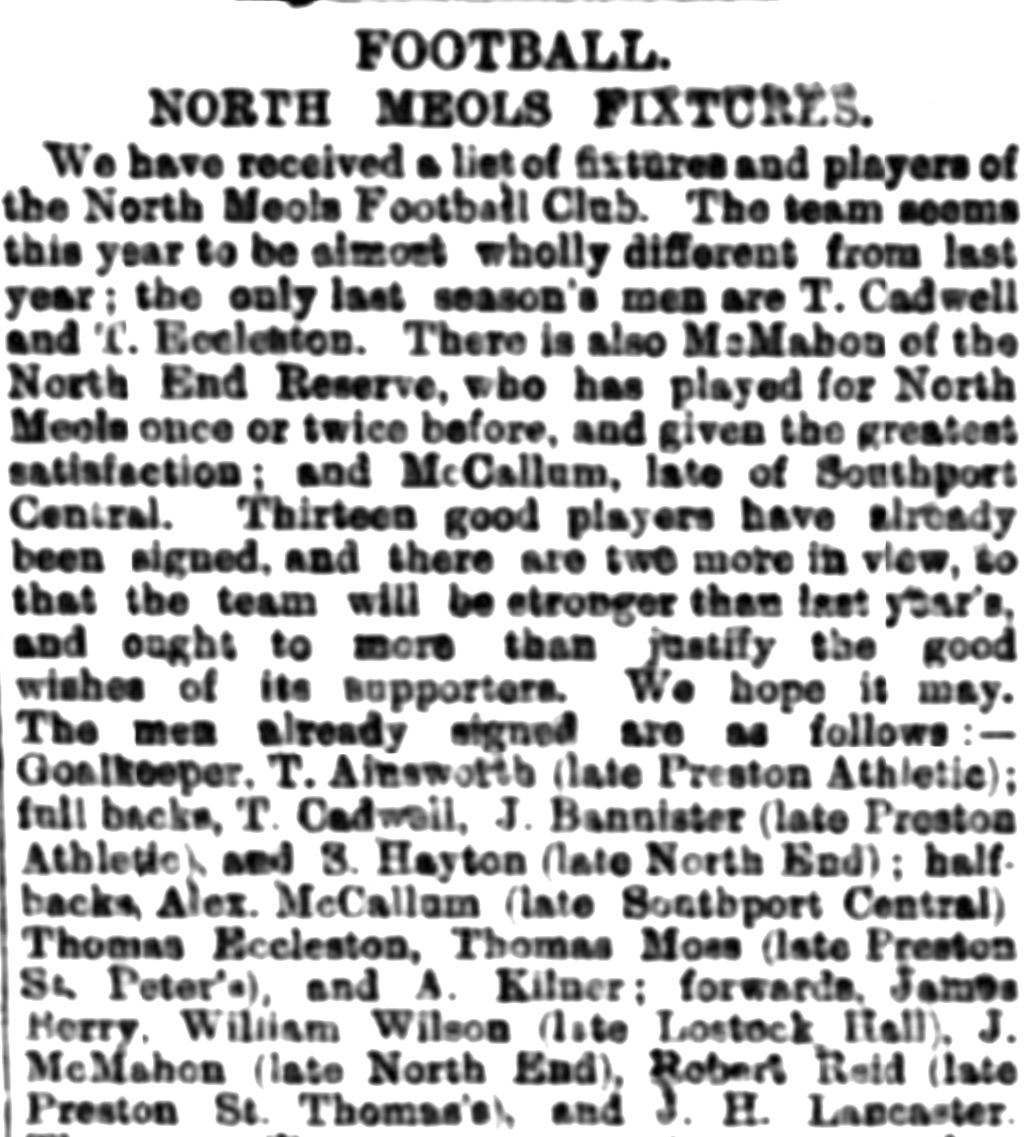
North Meols F.C. squad for 1894–95, Southport Visiter, 4 August 1894

The club was formed at the end of the 1890–91 season, from a merger between the High Park and Churchtown clubs; the new club instantly applied for membership of the new Lancashire Combination, aling with 15 other clubs for the 12 available places. In part this was because the existing league competition in the county - the Lancashire Alliance - was not available to the Meolers; High Park had finished 2nd in the Alliance's first season of 1890–91, but did not pay a fine imposed by the Alliance, so it pre-emptively expelled the merged club.

It was duly accepted as a Combination member, and the club's first match was a friendly at home to Blackburn Rovers, losing 3–2 but attracting a crowd of 2,000. However, it suffered a bad start to the season, including losing 6–0 to Heywood in the first of the 1891–92 FA Cup qualifying rounds, and in consequence the club was not considered a "draw" for more lucrative friendly matches; on top of which, the merged club did not retain the whole support of the two component clubs, and after half-a-season, the stresses had caused the club's first secretary (Luke Shaw) to quit the game. The one consolation was a run to the fifth round (last 16) of the Lancashire Junior Cup, where it lost 3–2 at home to Hindley, although even that achievement had a downside - of the attendance of 800, 600 had come with Hindley. At the end of the 1891–92 season, the club barely broke even, but was carrying a debt of over £70 held over from the predecessor clubs.

The club remained a member of the Combination in 1892–93, but, after a second successive mid-table finish, and another six goal thrashing in the first qualifying round of the 1892–93 FA Cup (at home to Oswaldtwistle Rovers), it withdrew from the Combination, to play in the (by now) lower-key Lancashire Alliance.

The club finished mid-table in the 1893–94 season, and optimistically recruited an almost entirely new XI for 1894–95. However the gamble did not work, as the club struggled to bottom three finish, and, although the club survived long enough to have its Alliance fixtures arranged for the 1895–96 season, it folded before the start of the campaign.

== Colours ==
High Park wore white shirts and knickers with black socks, which outfit seems to have carried on to the Meolers, as they too were recorded as wearing white shirts.

== Ground ==
The club's first ground was the former High Park ground at the corner of Wennington Road and Roe Lane, until it was taken for re-development in 1893; it therefore moved to a new ground, known as The Steels, off Peet's Lane. Neither ground was in the current North Meols area, but were within the town of Southport.
