= Alec Hooper =

English footballer (1900–1978)

Personal information
- Date of birth: 5 January 1900
- Place of birth: Darlington, England
- Date of death: December quarter 1978 (aged 78)
- Place of death: Burnley, England
- Height: 5 ft 11 1/2 in (1.82 m)
- Position: Left-back

Senior career*
Years	Team	Apps	(Gls)
19xx–1925	Shildon	?	(?)
1925–1926	Charlton Athletic	7	(0)
1926–1928	St Johnstone	?	(?)
1928	Nelson	9	(0)
1928–1929	Bangor City	?	(?)
1929	Barnoldswick Town	?	(?)
1929–1930	Bangor City	?	(?)
1930–1931	Accrington Stanley	0	(0)
1931–19xx	Barnoldswick Town	?	(?)
- * Club domestic league appearances and goals

Alec Hooper (5 January 1900 – December quarter 1978) was an English professional footballer who played as a left-back. Born in Darlington, he started his career in the north-east of England with Shildon before moving to London to join Football League Third Division South club Charlton Athletic in July 1925. Hooper made nine league and cup appearances for the Addicks as they finished second from bottom in the division and were forced to apply for re-election for the only time in their history. In November 1926, he signed for Scottish Football League Second Division outfit St Johnstone, where he spent two seasons.

Hooper returned to England with Third Division North side Nelson in June 1928. Signed to replace Clem Rigg as the club's first choice left-back, he made his Nelson debut in the opening game of the 1928–29 season, a 2–2 draw away at Hartlepools United. Hooper played the first eight games of the campaign before losing his place to Ted Ferguson. After three months out of the side, he returned to the starting line-up for one final match, helping the team to a 1–0 win against Hartlepools United. Soon afterwards, Hooper joined Welsh club Bangor City, where he remained until the end of the season. He signed for Barnoldswick Town in August 1929, but returned to Bangor midway through the 1929–30 campaign.

In the summer of 1930, Hooper went back to the Third Division North with Accrington Stanley. However, he could not break into the first-team and spent the entire season in the reserves. After leaving Accrington in August 1930, he returned for a second spell at Barnoldswick Town, his final club before retirement. Hooper died in Burnley, Lancashire, in the December quarter of 1978, at the age of 78.
