= William Morton (footballer) =

English footballer

Personal information
- Full name: William Morton
- Place of birth: England
- Position: Centre forward

Senior career*
Years	Team	Apps	(Gls)
- Bedlington P.M.
19xx–1927	Newbiggin West End		
1927–1928	Durham City	0	(0)
1928–1929	Craghead United		
1929	Nelson	8	(3)
1929–1930	Craghead United		
1930	Bedlington United		
1930	Blyth Spartans		
1930–1931	Queens Park Rangers	0	(0)
1931–1932	Craghead United		
1932–1933	Ashington		
1933–19xx	Stakeford Albion		
- * Club domestic league appearances and goals

William Morton was an English footballer who played as a centre forward. Most likely born in Northumberland, he played the majority of his career in local-league football but also had spells in The Football League. Morton played for Bedlington P.M. and Newbiggin West End before joining Third Division North side Durham City in 1927. However, he was unable to break into the first-team and did not make a senior appearance for the club. He left Durham the following year and returned to non-League football with Craghead United. In January 1929, Morton was signed by Third Division North outfit Nelson, initially as an amateur. He scored twice on his debut in the 4–1 win against Stockport County on 22 January and was awarded a professional contract the following month. He went on to score three goals in eight League appearances for Nelson, but he was unable to displace Bernard Radford as the club's first-choice centre forward, and was not retained at the end of the 1928–29 season.

For the 1929–30 campaign, Morton returned to the North East with Craghead United, and later had spells with Bedlington United and Blyth Spartans. In November 1930, he transferred to Third Division South club Queens Park Rangers but he did not play any League matches for the London-based outfit. His stay at QPR was brief, and he re-joined Craghead United for a third time in January 1931. Morton then spent the 1932–33 season with former League club Ashington before moving in June 1933 to Stakeford Albion, where he ended his career.
