= Arthur Jones (Nelson footballer) =

English footballer

Personal information
- Full name: Arthur Jones
- Place of birth: Birmingham, England
- Position: Left-back

Senior career*
Years	Team	Apps	(Gls)
19??–1927	Heywood		
1927–1928	Nelson	1	(0)
- * Club domestic league appearances and goals

Arthur Jones was an English professional footballer who played as a left-back. Born in Birmingham, he started his career in non-League football with Heywood before joining Football League Third Division North club Nelson as an amateur in May 1927. He was then awarded a professional contract in October of the same year. Jones made his senior debut for Nelson on 4 February 1928 in the 0–3 defeat away at Durham City. The match did not go well for Jones as he was at fault for two of the opposition goals. He never made another Football League appearance and left Nelson in May 1928.
