= John Brown (footballer, born 1890s) =

Scottish footballer

Personal information
- Full name: John Brown
- Place of birth: Glasgow, Scotland
- Position: Outside forward

Senior career*
Years	Team	Apps	(Gls)
- Broxburn
- Armadale
19xx–1921	Shawfield		
1921–19xx	East Stirlingshire		
19xx–1925	Brechin City		
1925–1926	Morton	21	(7)
1927	Nelson	2	(0)
1927–19xx	Manchester Central		
- * Club domestic league appearances and goals

John Brown was a Scottish professional footballer who played as an outside forward. Despite hailing from Glasgow, he started his career with Broxburn, near Edinburgh, and later played for Armadale in the Scottish Football League Second Division. He returned to his birthplace to join Shawfield, before re-entering League football with East Stirlingshire in August 1921. After a trial spell with St Johnstone, Brown found himself with Brechin City in the Scottish Third Division. In 1925, he was signed by First Division outfit Morton, and in a single season with the club he netted 7 goals in 21 first-team appearances.

Following Morton's relegation from the top-flight in 1926, Brown left the club and moved to England in the hope of furthering his professional career. He had a trial spell with Burnley in January 1927 but was not offered a contract, and the following month he began a loan spell at nearby Nelson. Due to the absence of Buchanan Sharp, who was suffering with influenza, Brown made his debut for Nelson in the Football League Third Division North match against Bradford Park Avenue on 12 February 1927. He retained his place in the team for the following match, a 1–4 defeat away at Walsall, but did not feature again for Nelson after that game.

In March 1927, Brown left Nelson and moved into English non-league football with Manchester Central.
