= Listed buildings in Rotherham (Hoober Ward) =

Hoober Ward is a ward in the Metropolitan Borough of Rotherham, South Yorkshire, England. The ward contains ten listed buildings that are recorded in the National Heritage List for England. All the listed buildings are designated at Grade II, the lowest of the three grades, which is applied to "buildings of national importance and special interest". The ward contains the villages of West Melton and Brampton Bierlow and the surrounding area. Most of the listed buildings are houses, and the others include two churches, a farm, a barn, a school house and schoolroom, a bridge, and two mileposts.

== Buildings ==
Name and location	Photograph	Date	Notes
Highfield Farm; 53.50358°N 1.36438°W	—	c. 1750	The farm buildings were extended later in the century, and in the 18th century. They are arranged round four sides of a yard, and are in sandstone, with roofs of stone slate and Welsh slate. The farmhouse is on the south, and the west range contains stables with a hayloft and granary above. In the north range is a threshing barn and a cowhouse, the east range contains cowhouses and a hayloft above, and to the south of this is a later range with cartshed and a pigeon loft and granary above. The farmhouse has two storeys and cellars, and three bays. There is a plinth and quoins, and the windows are sashes.
143–145 Melton High Street, West Melton; 53.50349°N 1.36045°W	—	18th century	A farmhouse and cottage incorporating an earlier aisled timber framed building, and with later alterations, the building is in stone with some brickwork, and modern roof covering with coped gables. There are two storeys and an L-shaped plan, consisting of a three-bay range, a lower three-bay range at right angles, and an outshut in the angle. Most of the windows are sashes. One of the doorway surrounds dates from the 17th century and has composite jambs and a monolithic lintel with a slight chamfer, and the others are later insertions.
Barn north of 143 and 145 Melton High Street, West Melton; 53.50346°N 1.36123°W	—	Mid 18th century	The barn is in sandstone with quoins and a roof of Welsh slate over 17th-century oak timber framing. There are five bays, and the openings include a central doorway with composite jambs, a segmental head, and a keystone. There are also pitching holes, and slit vents.
School house and schoolroom, Brampton Ellis Junior School; 53.50528°N 1.37158°W	—	Mid 18th century (probable)	The house and schoolroom were altered in 1791, and are in sandstone with roofs of tile and Welsh slate. The house has a plinth, quoins, and coped gables. There are three storeys, three bays, and a continuous rear outshut. The central doorway has a pediment, the windows in the two lower floors are sashes, and in the top floor they are casements. The schoolroom is recessed on the left and has a single storey and two bays, and the roof is hipped on the left. The windows are two-light casements with mullions, and above the door is an inscribed plaque, and a sundial with a decorative iron gnomon.
Beech House; 53.50361°N 1.36497°W	—	Late 18th century	The house, which was altered in the 19th century, is in sandstone with a roof of stone slate and tile. There are two storeys and an L-shaped plan, consisting of a main range of three bays, an extension to the left and a rear wing. The main range has a central doorway with pilasters and an entablature. To the left is a canted bay window. The other windows are sashes, those in the ground floor with wedge lintels.
United Reformed Church, West Melton; 53.50377°N 1.36246°W		1799	The church is rendered, on a plinth, with a floor band, shaped gutter brackets, and a hipped Welsh slate roof. There is a single storey, three bays on the front, and four on the sides. On the front are two doorways with part-fluted Doric columns on plinth blocks, fanlights, friezes with triglyphs, and mutule cornices. Between them is a round-arched window with a moulded sill. Along the sides are round-arched windows with an impost band and plain archivolt.
Wet Moor Bridge; 53.50633°N 1.35346°W	—	c. 1800	The bridge carries Wet Moor Lane over the Dearne and Dove Canal, now infilled. It is in sandstone, and consists of a single rusticated elliptical arch. The bridge has voussoirs, a rusticated soffit, a parapet with chamfered copings, and the end piers are linked by a band under the parapet.
Milepost near Abdy Lane; 53.48140°N 1.34321°W		19th century	The milepost is on the northwest side of Blackamoor Road, (B6092 road). It consists of a sandstone pillar with cast iron overlay, and has a triangular section and a rounded top. The top is inscribed "BRAMPTON BIERLOW & HOOTON" "ROBERTS ROAD" "SWINTON BRANCH" and "SWINTON", and on the sides are the distances to Doncaster, Conisbrough, Mexborough, Swinton, Barnsley, and Wentworth.
Milepost opposite Warren House Cottages; 53.47681°N 1.35402°W		19th century	The milepost is on the south side of Wentworth Road, (B6090 road). It consists of a sandstone pillar with cast iron overlay, and has a triangular section and a rounded top. The top is inscribed "BRAMPTON BIERLOW & HOOTON" "ROBERTS ROAD" and "RAWMARSH", and on the sides are the distances to Doncaster, Conisbrough, Hooton Roberts, Barnsley, and Wentworth.
Christ Church, Brampton Bierlow; 53.50337°N 1.36584°W		1853–55	The church is in sandstone with a slate roof, and is in Gothic Revival style. It consists of a nave, north and south aisles, a south porch, a chancel with north and south gabled projections, and a west tower. The tower has three stages, a doorway and a two-light window in the south front, an elaborate crocketed niche on the west front, clock faces, corner gargoyles, and a pierced parapet.
