= James Mangham =

English footballer (1907–1995)

Personal information
- Date of birth: 1 March 1907
- Place of birth: Cliviger, England
- Date of death: 23 October 1995 (aged 88)
- Place of death: Burnley, England
- Position: Goalkeeper

Senior career*
Years	Team	Apps	(Gls)
1924–1927	Portsmouth Rovers		
1927–1929	Nelson	2	(0)
- * Club domestic league appearances and goals

James Mangham (1 March 1907 – 23 October 1995) was an English footballer who played as a goalkeeper. He played two matches in the Football League with Nelson, conceding 10 goals during that time. He was born in Cliviger and lived in the Burnley area throughout his life.

== Career ==
As a youth, Mangham played local league football with Worsthorne before moving into senior football with Portsmouth Rovers in September 1924, at the age of 17. After three years with Portsmouth Rovers, he was signed by Football League Third Division North side Nelson at the start of the 1927–28 season. He spent most of the campaign as backup for regular goalkeeper Sam Warhurst, but eventually made his league debut for the club on 17 March 1928 in an away match against Hartlepools United. Despite conceding four goals, including an own goal by defender Clement Rigg, Nelson won the game 5–4 to claim only their second away victory of the season. Warhurst returned to the starting line-up for the following game, and Mangham reverted to his regular place in the reserve team.

Mangham had to wait until 4 September 1929 to make another first team appearance for Nelson, when he was selected to play in the away fixture at Darlington. Nelson were beaten 1–6, the team's heaviest defeat for seven months, and he was replaced by new signing Lewis Botto for the next match against Crewe Alexandra. Mangham did not play another first team match for Nelson, and his contract was subsequently cancelled in November 1929 as the club already had three more senior goalkeepers on their books. After leaving Nelson, he did not play for another club.
