= Arthur Hepworth =

English footballer

Personal information
- Full name: Arthur Hepworth
- Date of birth: 28 February 1908
- Place of birth: Barnsley, England
- Date of death: February 1988
- Place of death: Mirfield, England
- Height: 5 ft 9 1/2 in (1.77 m)
- Position: Half back

Youth career
- Worsbrough Communion
- Dodsworth Schoolboys

Senior career*
Years	Team	Apps	(Gls)
1926–1928	Barnsley	0	(0)
1928–1929	Nelson	16	(0)
1929–1931	Wombwell	?	(?)
1931–1933	E & A Smith's Sports	?	(?)
1933–19xx	Battyford Wanderers	?	(?)
- * Club domestic league appearances and goals

Arthur Hepworth (28 February 1908 – February 1988) was an English professional footballer, who played as a half-back. He was the son of Walter Hepworth, who assisted Barnsley in the Football League during the late 1890s, and the older brother of Ronnie Hepworth, who played over 100 league matches for Bradford (Park Avenue). A native of Wombwell, which was then in the West Riding of Yorkshire, he played youth football with Worsbrough Communion and Dodsworth, and represented the Yorkshire schoolboys team. In 1926 he joined Barnsley, but failed to break into the first team during his two years with the club.

In March 1928, Hepworth moved from Barnsley to struggling Football League Third Division North club Nelson, along with inside forward George Hayes. He made his debut for the Lancashire outfit in the 5–4 win against Hartlepools United at Seedhill. He went on to make 10 appearances during the remainder of the 1927–28 campaign as the side finished bottom of the division and were forced to apply for re-election to the League. In the summer of 1928 Nelson signed two new wing-halves, Jim Metcalfe and David Suttie, meaning Hepworth spent the majority of the 1928–29 season in the reserves. He played six consecutive matches in January and February 1929, but was dropped following the 2–7 defeat away at Barrow, and never again appeared for the first team.

Hepworth was released by Nelson in the summer of 1929 and subsequently returned to Yorkshire to play non-League football with Wombwell. In September 1931 he signed as an amateur for the E & A Smith's Sports club in Cleckheaton, before joining the Mirfield-based Battyford Wanderers in 1933. He remained in Mirfield until his death in February 1988.
