= David Cochrane (footballer) =

Scottish footballer (1910–??)

Personal information
- Full name: David Stobbie Cochrane
- Date of birth: 30 January 1910
- Place of birth: Dunblane, Scotland
- Date of death: Unknown
- Height: 5 ft 9 in (1.75 m)
- Position: Centre forward

Senior career*
Years	Team	Apps	(Gls)
1926–1927	Dunblane Rovers		
1927	Denny Hibernian	?	(16)
1927–1928	Nelson	2	(2)
1928	Bo'ness		
1928–19xx	Armadale		
- * Club domestic league appearances and goals

David Stobbie Cochrane (born 30 January 1910, date of death unknown) was a Scottish professional footballer who played as a centre forward. Born in Dunblane, he started his career with Dunblane Rovers before moving to Denny Hibernian in 1927. After scoring 16 goals in the first three months of the 1927–28 season, Cochrane was signed by Football League Third Division North club Nelson. He made his debut for the club on 12 November 1927, and scored a consolation goal in the 1–9 defeat away at Bradford City, Nelson's heaviest ever defeat in the Football League. Cochrane scored again a week later in the 3–2 win over Halifax Town. He made his final first-team appearance for Nelson on 26 November 1927 in the 0–3 defeat to Bradford Park Avenue in the First Round of the FA Cup.

Cochrane failed to settle in England, and a transfer to the Scottish Football League First Division outfit Bo'ness followed in January 1928. He played there for two months before moving to the Second Division side Armadale.
