= Brampton Bierlow =

Village and civil parish in South Yorkshire, England

Coordinates: 53.508744°N 1.373417°W

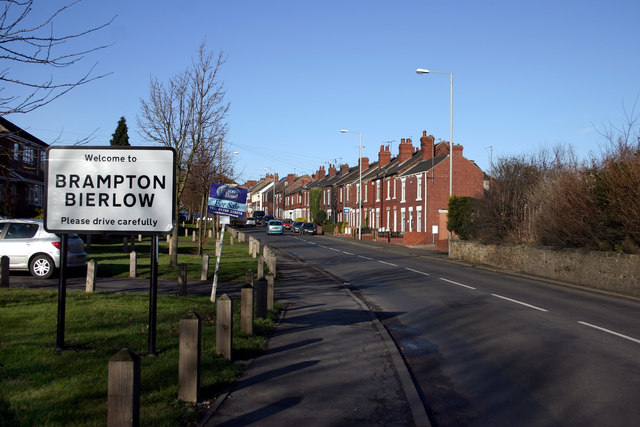

- Location within South Yorkshire
- Population: 4,610 (2011 census)
- OS grid reference: SE415015
  - London: 150 mi (240 km)
- Civil parish: Brampton Bierlow
- Metropolitan borough: Rotherham
- Metropolitan county: South Yorkshire
- Region: Yorkshire and the Humber
- Country: England
- Sovereign state: United Kingdom
- Post town: BARNSLEY
- Postcode district: S73
- Dialling code: 01226
- Police: South Yorkshire
- Fire: South Yorkshire
- Ambulance: Yorkshire
- UK Parliament: Wentworth

Brampton Bierlow is a village and civil parish in the Metropolitan Borough of Rotherham, South Yorkshire, England. It is situated on the south side of the Dearne Valley, between Barnsley and Rotherham.

== Etymology ==
The name Brampton derives from the Old English brōmtūn meaning 'settlement growing with broom'. The name Bierlow derives from the Old Norse býjarlǫg meaning 'a village community'.

== Population ==
According to the 2001 census, the parish had a population of 3,658, increasing to 4,610 at the 2011 Census.

== Historic significance ==
The parish was within the historic county boundaries of the West Riding of Yorkshire.

The area is traditionally part of the Barnsley area, but since 1 April 1974 was made part of Rotherham Metropolitan Council.

== Economy ==
Brampton Bierlow is a former mining village, with employment primarily related to the coal industry; the economy declined after the closure of mines in the 1980s, which was, in part, sparked by the announcement of the closure of Cortonwood Colliery in the village. Despite some economic recovery, Brampton was, at one point, declared one of the poorest areas in the European Union (before the 2004 expansion).

Recently, the economy of the area has improved, as investment has been put into infrastructure and developing light industry and service industries in the area.

== Notability ==
Steve Rothery, guitarist of the band Marillion, was born in Brampton. Footballers George Robledo and Ted Robledo, both of whom played football for local football club Barnsley F.C., grew up in the village: they were born in Chile but moved to Brampton (their mother's home) as children (in 1932) because of the instability in Chile at the time. George represented Chile at the 1950 FIFA World Cup.

== See also ==
- Listed buildings in Brampton Bierlow
- Listed buildings in Rotherham (Hoober Ward)
- Category:People from Brampton Bierlow
