= James Dargan =

English footballer

Personal information
- Full name: James Dargan
- Date of birth: 28 August 1906
- Place of birth: Manchester, England
- Date of death: May 1985 (aged 78)
- Place of death: Harlow, England
- Position: Inside forward

Senior career*
Years	Team	Apps	(Gls)
1925–1926	Northwich Victoria		
1928	Nelson	2	(0)
1928–1930	Northwich Victoria		
1930	Clitheroe		
1930	Barnoldswick Town		
1930–1931	Morecambe		
- * Club domestic league appearances and goals

James Dargan (28 August 1906 – May 1985) was an English footballer who played as an inside forward. Born in Manchester, he started his career with Cheshire League side Northwich Victoria in 1925 before moving to Football League Third Division North club Nelson in January 1928. Dargan made his debut for Nelson in the 3–4 defeat away at Rotherham United on 21 January 1928. He almost scored in the game, but his header was saved by the Rotherham goalkeeper, Tom Atter.

Dargan then spent three months out of the team, but returned to make his second and last Football League appearance in the 3–3 home draw with Crewe Alexandra on 21 April 1928. He was one of several players released by Nelson in the summer of 1928 and he subsequently returned to Northwich, where he stayed for two seasons. Dargan ended his career in non-league football, having short spells with Clitheroe and Barnoldswick Town in 1930, before playing out the 1930–31 campaign at Morecambe.
