= Jim Baker (footballer) =

English footballer

Personal information
- Full name: James William Baker
- Date of birth: 15 November 1891
- Place of birth: Ilkeston, England
- Date of death: 13 December 1966 (aged 75)
- Place of death: Leeds, England
- Height: 5 ft 8 1/2 in (1.74 m)
- Position: Central defender

Senior career*
Years	Team	Apps	(Gls)
1910–1912	Derby County		
1912	Portsmouth		
1912–1914	Hartlepool United		
1914–1920	Huddersfield Town	56	(3)
1920–1926	Leeds United	200	(2)
1926–1927	Nelson	28	(6)
- * Club domestic league appearances and goals

James William Baker (15 November 1891 – 13 December 1966) was an English professional footballer most notable for being the first captain of Leeds United He was the brother of Alf Baker who played for Arsenal. Another brother Aaron Baker also played football professionally and briefly played for Leeds.

Jim was born in Ilkeston and started his career at Hartlepool United, and played at Portsmouth before moving to Huddersfield Town, where he played under future Leeds manager Arthur Fairclough. When Fairclough moved to the newly formed Leeds United F.C. to become its first manager, Jim followed him and was handed the captain's armband to command from the center of defence. Jim played for six seasons at Elland Road being captain for the whole period, and even helped Fairclough guide the team to their first silverware and Second Division championship in 1923–24, being a rock at the heart of the Leeds defence along with Ernie Hart. Jim left Leeds after two seasons of just surviving in the First Division at the end of the 1925–26 season, moving to Nelson.

He served on the board of directors for Leeds United between 1959 and 1961.
