= Jack Brooks (footballer) =

English footballer

Personal information
- Full name: John Brooks
- Date of birth: 14 March 1904
- Place of birth: Stockton-on-Tees, England
- Date of death: 30 March 1973 (aged 69)
- Place of death: Stockton-on-Tees, England
- Height: 5 ft 10 in (1.78 m)
- Position: Right-back

Senior career*
Years	Team	Apps	(Gls)
1924–1926	Fulham	6	(0)
1926–1929	Darlington	54	(0)
1929	Nelson	6	(0)
1929–1932	York City	82	(0)
1932–1934	Bacup Borough	?	(?)
- * Club domestic league appearances and goals

John Brooks (14 March 1904 – 30 March 1973) was an English professional footballer who played as a right-back. Born in Stockton-on-Tees, he started his career with Fulham in May 1924 and made six Football League appearances during two seasons with the club. He made his senior debut on 8 September 1924 in the 1–0 win away at Port Vale. While at Fulham, he was awarded a gold medal after giving blood to club trainer Elijah Morse at the scene of a crash. In June 1926, Brooks joined fellow Football League Second Division side Darlington and played six league matches during his first season at the club. Darlington was relegated to the Third Division North in 1927 and Brooks subsequently became a more frequent first-team player.

Brooks moved to Nelson on a free transfer in March 1929 and made his debut for the club in the 2–1 win against Wigan Borough. He also played in the next four matches, before being dropped from the team following the 0–3 loss away at Stockport County on 6 April 1929. Brooks made only one more league appearance for Nelson, playing in an unfamiliar left-back position in the 1–5 defeat to Lincoln City on 20 April 1929. In August 1929, Brooks signed for York City, one of several new recruits as the club prepared for their first campaign in the Football League. He made a total of 93 league and cup appearances for the Minstermen in almost three years with the club. Brooks ended his playing career with Bacup Borough in the Lancashire Combination. Following his retirement from professional football, Brooks worked in the ICI General Chemicals factory in Durham. He died in Stockton-on-Tees in 1973, at the age of 69.
