= Jimmy Ruffell =

English footballer

Personal information
- Full name: James William Ruffell
- Date of birth: 8 August 1900
- Place of birth: Doncaster, England
- Date of death: 6 September 1989 (aged 89)
- Place of death: Bury St Edmunds, England
- Height: 5 ft 7 1/2 in (1.71 m)
- Position: Outside left

Senior career*
Years	Team	Apps	(Gls)
1920–1937	West Ham United	505	(159)
1937–1938	Aldershot	2	(1)

International career
1926–1929	England	6	(0)
- * Club domestic league appearances and goals

James William Ruffell (8 August 1900 – 6 September 1989) was an English footballer who played as an outside-left. He made over 500 appearances in the Football League for West Ham United, and ended his career with a short spell at Aldershot.

Ruffell was born in Doncaster, but moved south at an early age. He played for Essex Road School, Manor Park, Fullers, Chadwell Heath United, Manor Park Albion, East Ham and Wall End United, before West Ham signed him from the works team of the Ilford Electricity Board in March 1920. He made his League debut against Bury in December 1921.

He was an ever-present during the 1924–25 season, and went on to make 548 senior appearances for the Hammers, a record that wasn't beaten until Bobby Moore surpassed it in 1973. He scored a total of 166 goals, placing him third in the club's all-time records, above many of West Ham's finest strikers despite his role on the left wing. He was the club's top scorer for the 1927–28 and 1934–35 seasons, although he didn't score a single goal during the 1921–22, 1932–33, and 1936–37 seasons.

In 1923, he was part of the team that contested the first FA Cup Final to be staged at Wembley Stadium, known as The White Horse Final.

In April 1926, he made his England international debut in a 1–0 defeat by Scotland in Manchester. He played for England on another five occasions, but saw competition from the likes of Cliff Bastin, Eric Brook and Eric Houghton for the left-wing spot.

Ruffell left the east London club in 1937. He joined Aldershot for a short spell, where he made two League appearances and played his final game against Port Vale.

His brother Bill was also a professional footballer who had been on the books at West Ham and played League football for Nelson during the 1927–28 season.

== Honours ==
West Ham United

- FA Cup runner-up: 1922–23
