= Percy Roberts (Australian footballer) =

Australian rules footballer

Personal information
- Full name: Percy Edward Roberts
- Born: 20 September 1909; Nilma, Victoria
- Died: 3 August 1943 (aged 33); Moulmein, British Burma
- Original team: Yarragon
- Height: 182 cm (6 ft 0 in)

Playing career^{1}
Years	Club	Games (Goals)
1929–1932	Fitzroy	18 (1)
- ^{1} Playing statistics correct to the end of 1932.

Percy Edward Roberts (20 September 1909 – 3 August 1943) was an Australian rules footballer who played with Fitzroy in the Victorian Football League (VFL).

== Football career ==
Roberts came from Yarragon and made two appearances for Fitzroy as a 19-year-old defender early in the 1929 VFL season. He then left to play for Mornington. In the 1932 VFL season, Roberts returned to Fitzroy and played every game from rounds three to eighteen, a total of 16 appearances. It would be his only season back at Fitzroy, he was granted a clearance to Ballan in 1933.

== War service ==
Roberts enlisted for armed service on 7 February 1941 and a year later, at the Fall of Singapore, was captured by the Japanese. He died of dysentery while a prisoner of war in Moulmein, British Burma on 3 August 1943.
