= John Stevenson (footballer, born 1898) =

English footballer

Personal information
- Full name: John Alexander Stevenson
- Date of birth: 27 February 1898
- Place of birth: Wigan, England
- Date of death: 12 March 1979 (aged 81)
- Place of death: Carlisle, England
- Height: 5 ft 8 1/2 in (1.74 m)
- Position: Inside forward

Senior career*
Years	Team	Apps	(Gls)
–	Kilbirnie Hibs		
–	Beith		
1920–1921	Ayr United	15	(4)
1921–1923	Aberdeen	2	(0)
1922	→ Third Lanark (loan)	2	(0)
1923	→ Beith (loan)		
1923–1925	Bury	9	(1)
1925–1927	Nelson	73	(26)
1927–1930	St Johnstone	91	(24)
1930–1932	Falkirk	59	(17)
1932–1933	Chester	11	(2)
1933	Bristol Rovers	7	(1)
1933–1935	Carlisle United	65	(11)
Total		265	(77)
- * Club domestic league appearances and goals

John Alexander Stevenson (27 February 1898 – 12 March 1979) was a footballer who played mainly as an inside right.

Born in Wigan, Lancashire to an Irish-born father and Scottish mother, the family moved back to his mother's hometown of Kilbirnie, Ayrshire when he was a small child. His playing career reflected his origins with spells at several clubs over 15 years, mainly in Scotland and north-west England, including Ayr United, Aberdeen, Bury, Nelson, St Johnstone, Falkirk, Chester, Bristol Rovers and Carlisle United.

His younger brother George Stevenson was also a footballer had a successful career as player and manager with Motherwell and was also selected for Scotland, with no complications over sporting nationality having been born in 1905 after the family moved north of the border.
