= John McGuire (footballer) =

English footballer (1902–??)

Personal information
- Date of birth: 29 March 1902
- Place of birth: Darlington, England
- Height: 5 ft 10 in (1.78 m)
- Position: Centre forward

Senior career*
Years	Team	Apps	(Gls)
- Darlington Railway Athletic
19??–1925	Cockfield	?	(?)
1925–1926	Charlton Athletic	6	(0)
1926–1927	Wigan Borough	33	(13)
1927–1928	Nelson	20	(2)
1928–1930	Darlington	42	(7)
- * Club domestic league appearances and goals

John McGuire (born 29 March 1902, date of death unknown) was an English professional footballer who played for four different Football League clubs. Primarily a centre forward, he could also play as an inside forward and was occasionally used at left-half. Born in Darlington, County Durham, he began his career in non-League football with Northern Football League side Darlington Railway Athletic. He later had a spell with Cockfield before joining Football League Third Division South club Charlton Athletic in August 1925. In his first season with the London club he made six league appearances as the team finished 21st in the division and were forced to apply for re-election.

McGuire moved to the Third Division North in November 1926 when he signed for Wigan Borough. In what was to be the most prolific goalscoring period of his career, he netted 13 goals in 33 league matches for the Springfield Park club in a 13-month spell. Four months into the 1927–28 season, McGuire transferred to struggling Nelson on a free transfer. He made his debut for Nelson in the 1–5 defeat to Ashington at Seedhill on 3 December 1927. The following game, he scored his first goal for his new side in the 2–4 away loss at his former club Wigan Borough. McGuire went on to make a total of 20 league appearances for Nelson, but scored only once more. The team finished bottom of the Third Division North at the end of the campaign, and while their re-election application was successful several players, including McGuire, left the club in the summer of 1928.

In July 1928, McGuire signed for his hometown club, Darlington. He spent two seasons at Feethams, during which time he played 42 league matches and scored 7 goals before retiring from professional football at the end of the 1929–30 campaign.
