= Donkin (surname) =

Donkin is a surname. Notable people with the surname include:

- Billy Donkin (1900–1974), British footballer
- Bryan Donkin (1768–1855), British engineer, inventor and industrialist
- Bryan Donkin (physician) (1842–1927), British physician
- George Donkin (1892–1927), English footballer
- John Donkin (1802–1854), British engineer
- Dylan Donkin (21st century), American musician
- Mike Donkin (1951–2007), English reporter and journalist
- Nance Donkin (1915–2008), children's writer and journalist
- Peter Langloh Donkin (1913–2000), Air Commodore
- Robin Donkin (1928–2006), British historian and geographer
- Rufane Shaw Donkin (1773–1841), British soldier
- Sydney Donkin (1871–1952), British engineer
- William Fishburn Donkin (1814–1869), professor of astronomy at Oxford
