= Percy Roberts (Welsh footballer) =

Welsh footballer

Personal information
- Full name: Percy Roberts
- Place of birth: Wrexham, Wales
- Position: Centre forward

Senior career*
Years	Team	Apps	(Gls)
- Wrexham
1925–1926	Oswestry Town		
1926–1927	Nelson	1	(0)
1927–1928	Macclesfield	10	(8)
- * Club domestic league appearances and goals

Percy Roberts was a Welsh professional footballer who played as a centre forward. Born in Wrexham, he played youth football with Oak Alyn Rovers and later joined his hometown club Wrexham. He signed for Oswestry Town in the close season of 1925, spending one season with the team before joining Football League Third Division North side Nelson in August 1926. Roberts made his debut for the Lancashire club away at Stoke on 11 September 1926, in place of Jimmy Hampson, who was unavailable through injury. Although he was reported by the local newspaper to have "bustled about with some purpose", Nelson were defeated 1–4 despite a goal from Scottish forward Buchanan Sharp.

Roberts was not selected for Nelson again and played the remainder of the 1926–27 season with the reserve team. In May 1927 he had a trial with Cheshire County League side Ashton National, but he was not offered a permanent contract. The following month, he signed for fellow Cheshire League club Macclesfield. Roberts spent the majority of the 1927–28 campaign with Macclesfield before moving into amateur football with the Birmingham City Police in March 1928.
