= Richard Gaskell =

English footballer

Personal information
- Full name: Richard Halliwell Gaskell
- Date of birth: 11 October 1905
- Place of birth: Wigan, England
- Date of death: 23 June 1983 (aged 77)
- Place of death: Skelmersdale, England
- Position: Inside forward

Senior career*
| Years | Team | Apps | (Gls) |
| 1926–1928 | Wigan Borough | 3 | (1) |
| 1928 | Nelson | 3 | (0) |
| 1928–1929 | Westhoughton Collieries | ? | (?) |
| 1929 | Bolton Wanderers | 0 | (0) |
| 1929–1930 | Darwen | ? | (?) |
| 1930–1931 | Chorley | ? | (?) |
| 1931–1932 | Parbold | ? | (?) |
- * Club domestic league appearances and goals

Richard Halliwell Gaskell (11 October 1905 – 23 June 1983) was an English footballer who played as an inside forward. Born in Wigan, he started his career with Football League Third Division North side Wigan Borough in September 1926. Two years later, Gaskell joined fellow Third Division North club Nelson on a free transfer. One of several new players signed by Nelson during the 1927–28 campaign, he made his debut for the club in the 0–3 defeat away at Durham City on 4 February 1928. Gaskell struggled to make an impact at Seedhill and played just two more matches for Nelson, his final appearance coming in the 0–4 loss to New Brighton on 3 March 1928. He left the club at the end of the season and had a spell with Westhoughton Collieries before returning to the Football League with Bolton Wanderers in February 1929.

Gaskell moved to Darwen in August 1929 and went on to play for Chorley and Parbold before retiring in 1932. Outside of football, he worked as a schoolteacher and was the assistant headmaster at Highfields Secondary Boys' School in Wigan.
