= Bill Slack (footballer) =

English footballer

Personal information
- Full name: William Slack
- Date of birth: 20 January 1906
- Place of birth: Skegby, England
- Date of death: 9 August 1989 (aged 83)
- Place of death: Skegby, England
- Height: 5 ft 8 in (1.73 m)
- Position: Outside forward

Senior career*
Years	Team	Apps	(Gls)
1924–1927	Sutton Junction	?	(?)
1927	Shirebrook	?	(?)
1927	Sutton Junction	?	(?)
1927–1928	Blackpool	0	(0)
1928	Nelson	10	(3)
1928–1929	Portsmouth	0	(0)
1929–1930	Merthyr Town	?	(?)
1930–1932	Norwich City	?	(?)
1932–1936	Mansfield Town	?	(?)
1936–1937	Sutton Town	?	(?)
1937	Ripley Town	?	(?)
- * Club domestic league appearances and goals

William Slack (20 January 1906 – 9 August 1989) was an English professional footballer who played as an outside forward. Born in Skegby, he began his career in non-league football before joining Blackpool in 1927. Slack went on to play for several other Football League teams, including Nelson, Norwich City and Mansfield Town.

== Biography ==
William Slack was born in the village of Skegby, Nottinghamshire, on 20 January 1906. He served in the British Army and was a soldier in the Western Command. After his football career ended, he returned to live in Skegby and died there on 9 August 1989, at the age of 83.

== Football career ==
Slack began his career at Sutton Junction before moving on to Shirebrook in January 1927. After returning for a short spell at Sutton Junction later in the year, Slack was signed by Football League Second Division side Blackpool for a transfer fee of £125. With two months of the 1927–28 season remaining, he joined Nelson of the Third Division North on short-term contract. He scored a volleyed goal on his debut for the club in the 5–4 win away at Hartlepools United on 17 March 1928. Slack played the next three matches, before spending two games out of the team in place of Harold Taylor. He returned to the side for the match against Ashington on 14 April 1928, and scored his second goal for Nelson in a 1–5 defeat. Slack made a further five appearances for the East Lancashire outfit, but was released at the end of the season after the club finished bottom of the league.

After departing Nelson, Slack had spent a season with Portsmouth but failed to make a first-team appearance for the club. In June 1929, he joined Football League Third Division South side Merthyr Town but he could not prevent the team finishing bottom of the league and failing re-election, the defence having conceded a total of 135 goals during the campaign. Slack subsequently signed for fellow Third Division South outfit Norwich City. He spent two seasons with the Norfolk club, before moving to Mansfield Town in August 1932. Mansfield proved to be his last professional club, as he played at Field Mill for four years before joining non-league Sutton Town. Slack retired from football at the end of the 1936–37 season, following a short spell with Ripley Town.
