= Billy Donkin =

English footballer and cricketer

Personal information
- Full name: William Donkin
- Date of birth: 22 June 1900
- Place of birth: Annfield Plain, England
- Date of death: October quarter 1974 (aged 74)
- Place of death: Gateshead, England
- Position: Right-back

Youth career
- Twizzell United

Senior career*
Years	Team	Apps	(Gls)
1921–1922	Annfield Plain		
1922–1923	West Stanley	?	(?)
1923	Craghead United	?	(?)
1923–1924	Preston Colliery	?	(?)
1924–19xx	West Stanley	?	(?)
19xx–1925	Chester-le-Street	?	(?)
1925–1926	Annfield Plain	?	(?)
1926–1928	Spennymoor United	?	(?)
1928	Nelson	8	(0)
1928–1929	Spennymoor United	?	(?)
1929	Annfield Plain	?	(?)
1929–1930	Shildon	?	(?)
1930–1931	Blackhall Colliery Welfare	?	(?)
- * Club domestic league appearances and goals

William Donkin (22 June 1900 – October quarter 1974) was an English professional footballer who played as a right-back. Born in Annfield Plain, he assisted several clubs in the north-east of England and also had a spell in the Football League with Lancashire outfit Nelson. After retiring from football in 1931, Donkin began to play cricket and was hired as a professional by several local clubs.

== Biography ==
Billy Donkin was born on 22 June 1900 in the small mining village of Annfield Plain in County Durham. Aside from his time in Nelson, Lancashire, he lived in the north-east of England throughout his life. Donkin died in Gateshead in the October quarter of 1974, at the age of 74.

== Football career ==
As a youth, Donkin played for Twizzell United before joining his hometown club, Annfield Plain in June 1921. He went on to play for several non-league teams in the area, signing for West Stanley in September 1922 and subsequently spending time with Craghead United and Preston Colliery. Donkin later returned to West Stanley, before a spell at Chester-le-Street. He re-joined his first senior club, Annfield Plain, in June 1925 and remained there for one season before moving to Spennymoor United in September 1926. His performances for Spennymoor led to several professional teams taking an interest, and a transfer to Football League Third Division North side Nelson followed in the summer of 1928.

Donkin made his Football League debut on 25 August 1928 in the 2–2 draw away at Hartlepools United. He retained his place in the team for the first three matches of the season, before being dropped and replaced by Ted Ferguson following the 1–5 defeat to Southport on 8 September 1928. Donkin reclaimed the right-back spot for the 1–3 loss against Wrexham at Seedhill on 29 September 1928. He played the next five league matches as the team fell to five consecutive defeats, their worst run in the league since they lost the last six matches of the 1926–27 season. Donkin played his final game for Nelson on 20 October 1928 in the 0–4 defeat away at Carlisle United, before returning to Spennymoor due to family problems.

Donkin stayed at Spennymoor United for the remainder of the 1928–29 campaign, helping the team to a sixth-placed finish in the North Eastern League. In August 1929, he returned to Annfield Plain for a third spell with the side, but his stay was short as he moved on to Shildon in December of the same year. After spending the rest of the season with Shildon, he joined his last club, Blackhall Colliery Welfare. In 1931, Donkin retired from football to pursue his interest in cricket.

== Cricket career ==
Donkin spent the 1931 season with the Wheatley Hill Cricket Club, amassing a batting average of 127 runs. An all-rounder with the ability to bowl as well as bat, in one match while playing for Sacriston Colliery he took six wickets in three overs, without conceding a single run. During the remainder of his cricketing career, Donkin spent time as the resident professional at the Birtley and Dean Park cricket clubs.
