= George Hayes (footballer) =

Welsh footballer (1908–1984)

Personal information
- Full name: Thomas George Hayes
- Date of birth: 25 September 1908
- Place of birth: Taibach, Port Talbot, Wales
- Date of death: 16 May 1984 (aged 75)
- Place of death: Port Talbot, Wales
- Position: Forward

Senior career*
Years	Team	Apps	(Gls)
- Port Talbot Athletic
19xx–1927	Bridgend Town		
1927–1928	Barnsley	0	(0)
1928	Nelson	9	(5)
- * Club domestic league appearances and goals

Thomas George Hayes (25 September 1908 – 16 May 1984) was a Welsh professional footballer who played as a centre forward or an inside forward. Born in Port Talbot, he played for the Wales Schoolboys team as a youngster and had spells with Port Talbot Athletic and Bridgend Town. In the summer of 1927, Hayes moved to England to join Barnsley, but he never made a senior appearance for the club. He transferred to Third Division North side Nelson in March 1928, one of several new signings by the club as they strove to avoid finishing bottom of the league.

Hayes made his Nelson debut on 17 March 1928 in the 5–4 victory away at Hartlepools United. He scored his first goals for the club the following month, netting twice in the 4–0 home win against Darlington on 7 April, and scoring a consolation goal in the reverse fixture a week later. Hayes made a total of nine league appearances for Nelson, scoring five goals, but was released by the club at the end of the 1927–28 season.
