= Edwin Earle =

English footballer (1905–1987)

Personal information
- Full name: Edwin Earle
- Date of birth: 17 June 1905
- Place of birth: Newbiggin-by-the-Sea, England
- Date of death: 22 October 1987 (aged 82)
- Place of death: North Seaton, England
- Height: 5 ft 9 1/2 in (1.77 m)
- Position: Winger

Senior career*
Years	Team	Apps	(Gls)
1924–1925	Blyth Spartans	?	(?)
1925–1926	Nelson	54	(15)
1926–1928	Burnley	3	(1)
1928–1933	Boston Town	?	(?)
1933–1934	Crystal Palace	10	(3)
1934–1935	Gresley Rovers	?	(?)
1935	Boston United	?	(?)
1935–1936	Wisbech Town	?	(?)
- * Club domestic league appearances and goals

Edwin Earle (17 June 1905 – 22 October 1987) was an English professional association footballer who played as a winger. He played in the Football League for Nelson, Burnley and Crystal Palace and also had spells in non-league football. Born in Newbiggin-by-the-Sea, he returned to the north-east of England after his football career and died in North Seaton, near Ashington, at the age of 82.

== Career ==
Earle began his career with Newbiggin Athletic, before moving to Blyth Spartans in July 1924, where he became a professional in November that year. Outside of football, he also worked in the local coal mine. Earle's performances were noticed by Third Division North team Nelson who required a new outside-left. In the early hours of 15 September 1925, Nelson representatives visited the mine where Earle had just completed a night shift and signed him on a free transfer. The team had a game later that day and Earle travelled to Nelson to play the match, making his debut in the 2–2 draw with Ashington despite having had no sleep during the night. On 19 December 1925, he scored his first goal in the Football League in the 7–0 win over Tranmere Rovers, and scored two more in the following game against Wigan Borough. At the end of the 1925–26 campaign several First Division clubs, including Liverpool, Everton and Aston Villa, declared their interest in Earle, but Nelson declined all approaches for the player. He scored his first senior hat-trick on 4 September 1926 in the 5–1 win against Doncaster Rovers at Seedhill. From the day he signed to his final match on 18 December 1926, Earle played in 57 first-team matches, never missing a game during his time with the club.

In December 1926, he was signed by nearby First Division side Burnley for a transfer fee of £1,250. He made his Burnley debut on 12 February 1927 in the 1–4 defeat to Derby County. Earle found his opportunities limited at his new club, and was unable to displace first-choice outside-left Louis Page. Earle played in the 2–5 loss to Sheffield United on 29 March, before scoring his first Clarets goal in the 1–2 defeat against Sheffield Wednesday on 23 April. Despite this, Earle never again appeared for Burnley in a first-team match, and was placed on the transfer list at the end of the 1927–28 season. However, no offer was forthcoming and he joined non-league Boston Town on a free transfer in July 1928.

Earle spent five years with the Lincolnshire club before moving back into league football when he signed for Third Division South outfit Crystal Palace in the summer of 1933. He scored on his debut in the 4–0 win over Southend United in August 1933. Altogether, Earle managed three goals in 10 league appearances for the club, before leaving in August 1934 to return to non-league football with Gresley Rovers. He joined Boston United midway through the 1934–35 season, before signing for Wisbech Town in November 1935, where he ended his career in the summer of 1936.
