= Lewis Botto =

English footballer (1898–1953)

Personal information
- Full name: Lewis Anthony Botto
- Date of birth: 12 July 1898
- Place of birth: Jarrow, England
- Date of death: 4 June 1953 (aged 54)
- Place of death: Jarrow, England
- Height: 5 ft 8 in (1.73 m)
- Position: Goalkeeper

Senior career*
Years	Team	Apps	(Gls)
- Jarrow Rangers
192?–1923	Hebburn Colliery		
1923–1925	Durham City	49	(0)
1925–1926	Shildon Athletic		
1926–1927	Durham City	32	(0)
1927–1928	Wolverhampton Wanderers	16	(0)
1928–1929	Norwich City	2	(0)
1929	Nelson	1	(0)
1929–193?	Jarrow		
Total		100	(0)
- * Club domestic league appearances and goals

Lewis Anthony Botto (12 July 1898 – 4 June 1953), also written Louis Botto, was an English professional footballer who made 100 appearances in the Football League in the 1920s playing as a goalkeeper for Durham City, Wolverhampton Wanderers, Norwich City and Nelson. He also played non-league football for Jarrow Rangers, Hebburn Colliery, Shildon and Jarrow.

== Life and career ==
Botto was born in 1898 in Jarrow, County Durham, a son of William Botto and his wife Sarah, who kept a common lodging-house in Stanley Street. William Botto died in 1910, and the 1911 Census shows the 12-year-old Lewis resident in the Chadwick Memorial Industrial School in Carlisle. Sarah Botto died in 1911.

Botto played football for Jarrow Rangers and Hebburn Colliery before signing amateur form with Football League Third Division North club Durham City in October 1923. He made his debut in the 1923–24 FA Cup first qualifying round match against Dipton United on 6 October, which Durham lost 1–0. Because Durham had a league match on the same day, they fielded a reserve side in the FA Cup, an offence for which the club was fined £5 by the Football Association and required to pay the Dipton club £10 compensation for loss of gate money. Botto made seven league appearances that season, standing in for Jimmy Hugall when the player-manager decided not to pick himself.

In 1924–25, Botto was undisputed first choice in goal, ever-present in both league and FA Cup as Durham City finished in mid-table. He was included in Durham's retained list for the next season, but Harry Harrison was brought in from Darlington as first choice and Botto spent the season with Shildon of the North-Eastern League. Harrison moved on and Botto returned for the 1926–27 season, initially as an amateur but signing professional forms in October 1926. He made 32 league appearances, and was transfer-listed by the financially struggling club at the end of the season.

On application to the Football League, he was given a free transfer, and in August he signed for Second Division club Wolverhampton Wanderers, whose backup goalkeeper Jack Hampton had left for Derby County. Botto began the season with the reserve team playing in the Central League, and came into the league side in November when Noel George's health worsened. He played three matches before Alf Canavon took his place, but came back into the team in March when Canavon was injured and kept the position to the end of the season. He was initially included in Wolves' retained list, but in mid-September was one of five players unexpectedly listed for transfer. He joined Norwich City, but played just twice in the Third Division South and was released on a free transfer. After a single appearance for Nelson in the Third Division North, his contract was cancelled in December 1929 and he returned home to play North-Eastern League football for Jarrow.

Botto died in Jarrow in 1953 at the age of 54.
