= Heywood F.C. =

Heywood
- Full name: Heywood Football Club
- Founded: 1882
- Dissolved: 1897
- Ground: Pot Hall
- Secretary: E. Griffiths
Home colours

Heywood F.C. was an English association football club based in Heywood, Lancashire.

== History ==
The club was formed in 1882, in association with the Heywood cricket club; the club's formal name was the Heywood Cricket and Football Club.

It first played competitive football in the Lancashire Senior Cup in 1884–85, losing to Wigan A.F.C. in the first round, and was favourite to win the Bury & District Cup in 1886–87, but was controversially throw out of the competition after beating Shuttleworth F.C. 10–0. The club was found to have fielded an ineligible player, one Gregson, whose first appearance for the side had been 14 days before the Cup tie, rather than the 28 days required by the regulations.

Heywood was a founder member of the Lancashire League in 1889, along with town rivals Heywood Central. The club finished 7th and 5th in its first two Lancashire League seasons, both times however behind Central.

In the 1891–92 season, Heywood made its only appearance in the FA Cup, hammering North Meols in the First Qualifying Round, but scratching for the second at Newton Heath, although the clubs played the game as a friendly, Newton Heath winning 3–2.

It had become apparent that the town could not support two clubs at the same level, with Heywood losing £70 over the 1890–91 season and Central losing £100, and in the summer of 1891 there were discussions as to amalgamating Heywood and Central. Despite misgivings that club rivalries could make such an agreement impossible, a "merger" was agreed on 1 December 1891, although it was in substance a takeover of Heywood by Central, as the resulting club retained the Central name and played at the Central ground. It was agreed that both clubs would see out the 1891–92 season, although interest in Heywood collapsed, the club twice starting matches with 10 men. The club's final matches were 7–1 and 10–1 defeats in consecutive matches at home to Southport Central and away at Fleetwood Rangers over Easter en route to a last-place finish, with just 1 win all season (a 2–1 win at Southport Central in December).

The name was re-used by a club formed in 1897.

== Colours ==
The club wore blue and black striped jerseys. In the context of the times, "stripes" usually refers to what would now be called "hoops".

== Ground ==
The club originally played at the Back o' the Moss Ground. By 1888 it was playing at Pot Hall.

== External websites ==
- Heywood at the Football Club History Database
- FA Cup results archive at TheFA.com
