= Alfred Brown (footballer) =

English footballer

Personal information
- Full name: Alfred Brown
- Date of birth: 19 October 1898
- Place of birth: Chapeltown, England
- Date of death: 1989 (aged 90–91)
- Height: 5 ft 8 in (1.73 m)
- Position: Right half

Senior career*
Years	Team	Apps	(Gls)
1918–1919	Sheffield United	0	(0)
1919–1921	Rotherham Town		
1921–1923	Blackpool	9	(0)
1923–1925	Barnsley	12	(0)
1926	Swindon Town	14	(1)
1927	→ Nelson (trial)	2	(0)
1927–1929	Hurst		
1929–1932	Manchester Central		
1932–19xx	Stalybridge Celtic		
- * Club domestic league appearances and goals

Alfred Brown (19 October 1898 – 1989) was an English professional footballer. A right half or left half, he played for five clubs in a career spanning less than ten years.

== Career ==
As a youth, Brown played for Sheffield Schoolboys and Carbrook Reform. He began his senior career with Sheffield United in his hometown. After failing to make any Football League appearances for the Blades, he transferred to nearby Midland League side Rotherham Town in July 1919. After two seasons with Rotherham, he moved west to join Blackpool in May 1921. He made nine League appearances for the Seasiders in his three seasons with the club.

In 1923, Brown moved back to his native Yorkshire to sign for Barnsley. In two years with the Tykes, Brown made twelve League appearances.

Swindon Town became his next club, in 1926, and it was with Town that he scored his first League goal. It came during fourteen appearances. During the 1927–28 season, Brown went on trial from Swindon to Nelson, for whom he made two appearances. After leaving Swindon, he moved into non-League football in the Manchester area, initially with Hurst. In November 1929, Brown signed for Manchester Central, where he stayed for three years before moving to Stalybridge Celtic in 1932.
