= John Dodsworth (footballer) =

English footballer

Personal information
- Full name: John George Dodsworth
- Date of birth: 6 March 1907
- Place of birth: Darlington, England
- Date of death: March 1996
- Place of death: Darlington, England
- Height: 5 ft 9 in (1.75 m)
- Position: Half-back

Senior career*
Years	Team	Apps	(Gls)
1928	Darlington	1	(0)
1928–1930	Nelson	2	(0)
1930	Shildon	?	(?)
1930–1931	Crook Town	?	(?)
- * Club domestic league appearances and goals

John George Dodsworth (6 March 1907 – March 1996) was an English professional footballer who played as a right-half. Born in Darlington, County Durham, he joined the Darlington reserve team in March 1928 and played his only league game for the club on 5 May 1928 in the 1–3 defeat away at Rotherham United. Later that month, Dodsworth signed for Football League Third Division North side Nelson, following in the footsteps of Jack English, his former manager at Darlington. He was one of a number of Darlington players suspended by The Football Association in relation to alleged irregular payments, and subsequently was unavailable for selection for his new club until January 1929.

An injury to the Nelson captain, former England international defender George Wilson, meant that Dodsworth was included in the team for the 3–0 win over New Brighton at Seedhill on 2 February 1929. He also played in the following match, a 1–3 loss to Wrexham a week later. That proved to be Dodsworth's last Football League game, and in February 1930 he moved back to the north-east to sign for non-league outfit Shildon. He spent six months with the club before moving to Crook Town, where he played for one season before retiring from football in 1931.
