= Fred Mace (footballer) =

English footballer

Personal information
- Full name: Fred Mace
- Date of birth: October quarter 1895 poss error
- Place of birth: Hayfield, England
- Date of death: 18 August 1938 (aged 39)
- Place of death: Blackpool, England
- Height: 6 ft 0 in (1.83 m)
- Position: Goalkeeper

Senior career*
Years	Team	Apps	(Gls)
- Godley Athletic
19xx–1919	Copley Celtic		
1919–1925	Stalybridge Celtic	1	(0)
1925–1927	Nelson	8	(0)
1927–19xx	Macclesfield Town		
- * Club domestic league appearances and goals

Fred Mace (October quarter 1895 – 18 August 1938) was an English professional footballer who played as a goalkeeper. Born in Hayfield, Derbyshire, he began his playing career in local-league football with Godley Athletic and Copley Celtic. In 1919, he joined Lancashire Combination side Stalybridge Celtic. The club was one of the founder members of the Football League Third Division North two years later, and Mace made one league appearance for them. Stalybridge left the Football League in 1923 to play in the Cheshire County League, where Mace was described as one of the best goalkeepers in the competition.

In May 1925, he was signed by Third Division North side Nelson, for a transfer fee of £100, as an understudy to Harry Abbott. He found it difficult to supplant Abbott and hence it was almost a year before he made his Nelson debut in the 3–3 draw with Chesterfield on 20 April 1926. It was another twelve months before Mace was selected for the team again, returning for the 6–2 win against Hartlepools United on 9 April 1927. He remained in goal for the following five matches, but the team suffered defeat in all five games and Mace was dropped following a 2–7 loss away at New Brighton. He made his final appearance for Nelson in the final match of the 1926–27 season, a 0–2 home defeat to Tranmere Rovers.

During his time with Nelson, Mace was a regular starter for the reserve team and missed only one match as the side won the Lancashire Combination in 1925–26. He was offered a contract by the club for the 1927–28 season, but he rejected it and opted instead to move into non-League football with Macclesfield Town, where he ended his career.
