= Joe Halliwell =

English footballer (1892-1964)

Personal information
- Full name: Joseph Adam Halliwell
- Date of birth: 17 January 1892
- Place of birth: Preston, England
- Date of death: July quarter 1964 (aged 72)
- Place of death: Nelson, England
- Height: 5 ft 6 in (1.68 m)
- Position: Centre forward

Youth career
- Lostock Hall

Senior career*
Years	Team	Apps	(Gls)
1912–1913	Preston North End	26	(10)
1913–1927	Barnsley	312	(83)
1927–1929	Nelson	74	(9)
1929–1933	Barnoldswick Town	?	(?)
- * Club domestic league appearances and goals

Joseph Adam Halliwell (17 January 1892 – July quarter 1964) was an English professional footballer who played as a centre forward. He started his senior career with Preston North End and scored 10 goals in 22 league matches during the 1912–13 season as the team won the Football League Second Division. After making four further appearances for Preston at the start of the following campaign, Halliwell transferred to Barnsley in December 1913. He remained at Oakwell for 14 years and played 312 league games for the club, scoring 83 goals.

In June 1927, Halliwell joined Third Division North side Nelson on a free transfer. During his time at Nelson he played predominantly as a right-half. He made his debut for the club on 27 August 1927 in the 1–4 home defeat to Accrington Stanley and went on to play every first-team match in that season. Halliwell scored his first Nelson goal on 1 December 1928, netting the winner in the 2–1 victory away at Halifax Town. He played several matches as a forward during the 1928–29 campaign and ended the season with nine league goals.

Halliwell was not retained by Nelson in the summer of 1929 and subsequently moved into non-League football with Barnoldswick Town of the Lancashire Combination. He spent almost four years with Barnoldswick before joining Preston-based club St Paul's as an amateur in January 1933. Following his retirement from football he became the landlord of a public house in Barrowford. Halliwell died in Lostock Hall, Lancashire, in the summer of 1964 at the age of 72.
