= Jim Metcalf (footballer) =

English footballer

Personal information
- Full name: James Alfred Metcalf
- Date of birth: 10 December 1898
- Place of birth: Whitburn, England
- Date of death: 20 February 1975 (aged 76)
- Place of death: Preston, England
- Height: 5 ft 8 1/2 in (1.74 m)
- Position: Wing half

Senior career*
Years	Team	Apps	(Gls)
- Sunderland Royal Rovers
19??–1920	Southwick		
1920–1927	South Shields	185	(2)
1927–1928	Preston North End	16	(0)
1928–1930	Nelson	71	(1)
- * Club domestic league appearances and goals

James Alfred Metcalf (12 December 1898 – 20 February 1975) was an English professional footballer who played as a wing half. He was born in Whitburn, County Durham, and as an adolescent he played local football with Sunderland Schoolboys and Sunderland Royal Rovers. He later played for Southwick, where he won several local amateur trophies. Metcalf was signed by Football League Second Division club South Shields in April 1920 and went on to play seven seasons with the Horsley Hill club, making 185 appearances and scoring twice. In June 1927 he joined Second Division rivals Preston North End on a free transfer. During a single season with the Lancashire club, he played in 16 league matches.

The following summer Metcalf joined Third Division North side Nelson for a transfer fee of £250. He made his debut for the club in the 2–2 draw away at Hartlepools United on 25 August 1928. Metcalf missed only one match of the 1928–29 season, the last game of the campaign against Accrington Stanley. On 26 October 1929, he scored his first and only league goal for Nelson in the 4–1 win against Doncaster Rovers at Seedhill. In his two years with Nelson, Metcalf made a total of 71 first-team appearances before retiring from professional football in the summer of 1930.

In July 1931 Metcalf was appointed to the training staff of his former club Preston North End and remained at the club for eight years. Upon leaving Preston he became a trainer at Leicester City, but his stay was curtailed by the outbreak of the Second World War, which meant that competitive football was abandoned for six years in England. He was re-appointed to the position in August 1949.
