= David McClure (footballer) =

Scottish footballer

Personal information
- Full name: David McClure
- Place of birth: Slamannan, Scotland
- Position: Right-back

Senior career*
| Years | Team | Apps | (Gls) |
| 1 | Glenavon | | |
| 19xx–1924 | Dunipace | | |
| 1924–1927 | St Johnstone | | |
| 1927–1928 | Nelson | 28 | (1) |
| 1928–1930 | Dundee United | | |
| 1930–1933 | Portadown | | |
| 1933–19xx | Glentoran | | |
- Montrose
- * Club domestic league appearances and goals

David McClure was a Scottish professional footballer who played as a right-back who had spells in Scotland, Ireland and England. He was born in Slamannan, Stirlingshire, but began his footballing career in Ireland with Glenavon. McClure then returned to Scotland to play Junior league football with Dunipace, before joining Scottish Football League club St Johnstone in 1924. In June 1927, he was signed by Football League Third Division North club Nelson and made his debut for the club on 24 September 1927 in the 2–1 win against Durham City. He went on to make 29 first-team appearances for Nelson during the 1927–28 season, and scored his first League goal in the 6–3 victory over Rochdale on 7 January 1928.

McClure left Nelson in the summer of 1928 and subsequently returned to Scottish League football with Dundee United. In July 1930, he moved back to Ireland with Portadown. McClure remained at Portadown for three seasons, and during this time he was selected to represent the Irish Football League on two occasions in matches against the English League and Scottish League representative teams. He later joined Glentoran in February 1933, before returning to Scotland once more to sign for Montrose, his last senior club.
