= Andrew Ronald Mitchell =

Scottish mathematician (1921–2007)

Andrew Ronald Mitchell (22 June 1921 – 22 November 2007) was a British applied mathematician and numerical analyst. He was a professor of mathematics at the University of St Andrews, Dundee, Scotland. He was known for his contributions to the field of numerical analysis of partial differential equations in general and finite difference method and finite element method in particular. Mitchell has authored several influential books on numerical solution of partial differential equations, including "The Finite Element Analysis in Partial Differential Equations" with Richard Wait and "The Finite Difference Method in Partial Differential Equations" with David F. Griffiths.

== Early life and education ==
Mitchell was born in Dundee, Scotland, on 22 June 1921. His father was a blacksmith. Mitchell went to school at Morgan Academy, Dundee. He played football at school and was invited to sign for North End Junior Football Club in Dundee. He left Morgan Academy in 1938 after receiving a scholarships through the school to do a mathematics degree in the University College, Dundee. He graduated with First Class Honours in 1942, and was called up and sent to the wartime Ministry of Aircraft Production in London, where he remained until after the end of the war. While he was in London, he continued to play football during the war, turning out a few times for Chelsea. After the war he played for a number of Scottish clubs including St Johnstone, East Fife, Brechin City before ending his playing career at Berwick Rangers in 1955.
