= John Stoneham (footballer) =

English footballer

Personal information
- Full name: John Stoneham
- Date of birth: 15 June 1892
- Place of birth: Witham, England
- Date of death: 1950 (aged 57–58)
- Height: 6 ft 2 1/2 in (1.89 m)
- Position: Goalkeeper

Senior career*
Years	Team	Apps	(Gls)
1920–1923	Carlisle United		
1923–1927	Sunderland	13	(0)
1927–1928	Nelson	6	(0)
- * Club domestic league appearances and goals

John Stoneham (15 June 1892 – 1950) was an English professional footballer who played as a goalkeeper for Sunderland.
