= Lewis Bedford (footballer) =

English footballer (1899–1966)

Personal information
- Full name: Lewis Bedford
- Date of birth: 26 May 1899
- Place of birth: Castle Bromwich, England
- Date of death: 29 June 1966 (aged 67)
- Place of death: Birmingham, England
- Height: 5 ft 6 1/2 in (1.69 m)
- Position: Outside forward

Senior career*
Years	Team	Apps	(Gls)
1920–1922	West Bromwich Albion	3	(0)
1922–1925	Walsall	97	(5)
1925–1926	Sheffield Wednesday	11	(2)
1926–1927	Walsall	23	(6)
1927–1928	Nelson	32	(7)
1928	Walsall	16	(1)
1928–1929	Luton Town	49	(15)
1929–1931	Walsall	6	(1)
Total		237	(37)
- * Club domestic league appearances and goals

Lewis Bedford (26 May 1899 – 29 June 1966) was an English professional footballer who played as an outside forward. He started his career with West Bromwich Albion, whom he joined as an amateur in November 1920. In March 1921, Bedford signed professional terms with the club but made only three senior appearances for the side before joining Walsall in 1922. In the first of four spells with Walsall, Bedford played 97 league matches before joining Sheffield Wednesday in August 1925 for a transfer fee of £575 (£30,000 as of 2025). He scored 2 goals in 11 appearances for the Hillsborough outfit as they won the Football League Second Division at the end of the 1925–26 campaign.

In the summer of 1926, Bedford returned to Walsall for a fee of £200 (£11,000 as of 2025). He played a total of 26 matches and scored 3 goals for the side before moving to Football League Third Division North rivals Nelson midway through the season. He made his Nelson debut on 12 March 1927, scoring twice in the 7–0 victory away at Accrington Stanley. Bedford kept his place in the team for the remainder of the campaign, and added to his goal tally with strikes against Barrow and Chesterfield. He remained the club's first-choice outside left going into the 1927–28 season and scored the winning goal in a 2–1 win away at Southport on 17 September. Bedford lost his starting berth following the 1–9 defeat to Bradford City, Nelson's heaviest defeat during their ten seasons in the Football League, on 12 November 1927. He was recalled to the side three matches later, and scored his last Nelson goal in the 1–1 draw with Tranmere Rovers on 27 December. His last appearance for the Seedhill club came two games later, in the 1–6 loss to Crewe Alexandra on 1 January 1928.

The following month, Bedford returned to Walsall for a third spell with the club. His stay was short however, as he scored once in 16 league matches before moving to Luton Town two months later. While at Luton, he played alongside fellow former Nelson players John Black and Harry Abbott, and enjoyed the most prolific goal-scoring period of his professional career, netting 15 goals in 49 appearances for the Bedfordshire club. In December 1929, he moved back to Walsall for a fourth and final time, but did not feature regularly for the first team. He was restricted to six league matches before leaving in 1931 to move into non-league football with the Bloxwich Strollers. Bedford went on to play amateur football until the age of 40, eventually retiring in June 1940 following a spell with Walsall Wood. After football, he worked as a foreman for a mineral water company.
