= Bill Ruffell =

English footballer

Personal information
- Full name: William George Ruffell
- Date of birth: 29 April 1905
- Place of birth: Poplar, England
- Date of death: March 1988 (aged 82)
- Place of death: Epsom, England
- Height: 5 ft 9 in (1.75 m)
- Position: Inside forward

Senior career*
Years	Team	Apps	(Gls)
1925–1927	West Ham United	0	(0)
1927–1928	Nelson	12	(2)
	Epsom Town	?	(?)
- * Club domestic league appearances and goals

William George Ruffell (29 April 1905 – March 1988) was an English professional footballer who played as an inside forward. He was the younger brother of Jimmy Ruffell, who made more than 500 league appearances for West Ham United and won six caps for the England national football team.

Born in Poplar, Ruffell started his career with West Ham United, where he earned his first professional contract in October 1925. However, over the following two seasons he was unable to break into the first team and he subsequently joined Football League Third Division North side Nelson in August 1927. He made his debut for Nelson in the 2–1 away win against Southport on 17 September 1927, taking the place of Henry White who was dropped despite starting the first four matches of the season. Ruffell retained his starting berth for the following game, although he was moved to inside-left, as Nelson recorded a 2–1 home victory over Durham City. He scored his first goal for the Lancashire club on 10 December 1927 in the 2–4 defeat away at Wigan Borough. Three weeks later, Ruffell marked his tenth Nelson appearance with a goal, but he could not prevent a 1–7 defeat to local rivals Accrington Stanley. He played his twelfth and final league match for the club on 14 January 1928 as the team suffered another heavy defeat, losing 1–5 to Halifax Town.

Nelson finished bottom of the Third Division North in the 1927–28 season and Ruffell was one of several players to leave the club at the end of the campaign. He went on to have trial spells with both Stockport County and Crewe Alexandra, but was not offered a deal by either club. Ruffell subsequently moved into non-League football with Epsom Town, where he ended his career.
