= Ted Ferguson =

English footballer

Personal information
- Full name: Edward Ferguson
- Date of birth: 2 August 1895
- Place of birth: Seaton Burn, England
- Date of death: 8 February 1978 (aged 82)
- Place of death: Seaton Burn, England
- Height: 5 ft 9 in (1.75 m)
- Position: Right-back

Senior career*
Years	Team	Apps	(Gls)
1919–1920	Ashington	?	(?)
1920–1924	Chelsea	11	(0)
1924–1928	Ashington	120	(5)
1928–1930	Nelson	67	(0)
1930–1933	Annfield Plain	?	(?)
Total		198	(0)
- * Club domestic league appearances and goals

Edward Ferguson (2 August 1895 – 8 February 1978) was an English professional footballer who played as a right-back. He made almost 200 appearances in the Football League for Chelsea, Ashington and Nelson. His brother, Robert, also played for Nelson.
