= Bernard Radford =

English footballer (1908–1986)

Personal information
- Full name: Bernard Radford
- Date of birth: 23 January 1908
- Place of birth: West Melton, England
- Date of death: 2 October 1986 (aged 78)
- Place of death: Basingstoke, England
- Height: 5 ft 9 in (1.75 m)
- Position: Centre forward

Senior career*
Years	Team	Apps	(Gls)
1925–1926	Wath Athletic	?	(?)
1926–1927	Wombwell	?	(?)
1927	Darfield	?	(?)
1927–1929	Nelson	55	(41)
1929–1931	Sheffield United	20	(7)
1931–1932	Northampton Town	8	(0)
- * Club domestic league appearances and goals

Bernard Radford (23 January 1908 – 2 October 1986) was an English professional footballer who played as a centre forward, and occasionally as an inside forward. Born in West Melton, West Riding of Yorkshire, Radford began his career in local league football with Wath Athletic, Wombwell and Darfield, before signing as a professional with Football League Third Division North side Nelson in December 1927. He made his League debut in the 0–1 defeat to Doncaster Rovers on 17 December, and scored his first three goals for Nelson on 7 January 1928 as the side beat Rochdale 6–3. Radford scored all four goals in the 4–0 victory against Wrexham on 11 February, becoming only the second Nelson player, after Jimmy Hampson, to achieve the feat in a League match.

Radford remained in goalscoring form going into the 1928–29 season, netting in the opening match of the campaign against Hartlepools United. He then scored four goals in three matches in September 1928, and had a tally of 14 by Christmas. On 16 February 1929, he scored the only goal of the game as Nelson beat Chesterfield 1–0, and scored twice the following match in the 2–7 defeat away at Barrow. Radford ended the season with 24 goals, taking his total at Nelson to 41 in 55 matches. He was signed by Football League First Division club Sheffield United in the summer of 1929, but found first-team opportunities limited there and only played 20 matches in two seasons, although he did score 7 goals for the side. Radford subsequently spent a season with Northampton Town, but played in the reserves for most of the campaign, making just eight league appearances. He was released in the summer of 1932 and later moved into amateur football, initially with the Royal Navy Depot in Chatham, Kent.

Radford stayed in southern England until his death in Basingstoke, Hampshire, on 2 October 1986 at the age of 78.
