= Jack Fletcher (footballer, born 1905) =

English footballer

Personal information
- Date of birth: 6 August 1905
- Place of birth: Padiham, England
- Height: 5 ft 6 1/2 in (1.69 m)
- Position: Outside forward

Senior career*
Years	Team	Apps	(Gls)
19??–1927	Colne Town		
1927–1929	Nelson	11	(1)
1929–1930	Clitheroe		
1930–1932	Accrington Stanley	1	(0)
1932–1933	Burnley	0	(0)
1933–1934	Fleetwood	?	(?)
- * Club domestic league appearances and goals

Jack Fletcher (6 August 1905 – after 1933) was an English professional footballer who played as an outside forward. He played 12 matches in the Football League.
