= William Bossons =

English footballer

Personal information
- Full name: William Horace Bossons
- Date of birth: April 1901
- Place of birth: Newcastle-under-Lyme, England
- Date of death: 1970 (aged 68)
- Place of death: Newcastle-under-Lyme, England
- Position: Goalkeeper

Senior career*
| Years | Team | Apps | (Gls) |
| 1925 | Stockport County | ? | (?) |
| 1925–1927 | Macclesfield Town | 62 | (0) |
| 1927–1928 | Nelson | 4 | (0) |
| 1928–1929 | Whitchurch | ? | (?) |
| 1929–1930 | Winsford United | ? | (?) |
| 1930–1931 | Oswestry Town | ? | (?) |
- * Club domestic league appearances and goals

William Horace Bossons (April 1901 – 1970) was a footballer who played as a goalkeeper. He played four matches in the Football League Third Division North for Nelson in the 1927–28 season.

== Career ==
Bossons started his playing career with Stockport County in March 1925. Eight months later, he joined Macclesfield Town, where he stayed for almost two seasons. In September 1927, Bossons was signed by Football League Third Division North outfit Nelson after a successful trial period. He made his league debut for the club on 8 October 1927 in the 3–3 draw with Chesterfield at Seedhill. He went on to make a further three league appearances for Nelson, conceding a total of 14 goals in his four matches. Bossons played his last game for Nelson on 10 December 1927, in the 2–4 defeat away at Wigan Borough.

Bossons was released in February 1928 and subsequently moved into non-league football with Whitchurch, who played in the Shropshire League. One season later, he transferred to Winsford United and in the summer of 1930 joined Oswestry Town, where he ended his career.
