= Ronald Mitchell =

English footballer (1902–??)

Personal information
- Full name: Ronald Mitchell
- Date of birth: July quarter 1902
- Place of birth: Birkenhead, England
- Date of death: Unknown
- Height: 5 ft 9 1/2 in (1.77 m)
- Position: Left-half

Senior career*
Years	Team	Apps	(Gls)
	Dick, Kerr's	?	(?)
	Skelmersdale United	?	(?)
1922–1924	Liverpool	0	(0)
1924–1926	Hull City	27	(1)
1926–1927	Nelson	32	(0)
1927–1928	Bristol City	0	(0)
1928–1929	Mossley	33	(7)
1929	Great Harwood	?	(?)
1929–1930	Fleetwood Windsor Villa	?	(?)
- * Club domestic league appearances and goals

Ronald Mitchell (born July quarter 1902, deceased) was an English professional footballer who played as a left-half. After beginning his career as an amateur, Mitchell joined Liverpool in 1924 but failed to make a first-team appearance. In 1926 he moved to Hull City, where he spent two seasons before transferring to Nelson. Following a spell with Bristol Rovers in the 1927–28 season, Mitchell returned to non-league football, ending his career with Fleetwood Windsor Villa.

== Biography ==
Ronald Mitchell was born in the town of Birkenhead in the July quarter of 1902. Before becoming a professional footballer, he worked for the locomotive manufacturer Dick, Kerr & Co. His whereabouts after his retirement from football are untraced, and his date of death is unknown.

== Football career ==
Mitchell played football for the Dick, Kerr's works team before joining Skelmersdale United as an amateur in the early 1920s. In June 1922, he was signed by Football League First Division side Liverpool for a transfer fee of £75. Mitchell spent two years with the Anfield club, but failed to break into the first team and he was released in the summer of 1924. He subsequently spent two years with Hull City, during which time he scored one goal in 27 league appearances.

In May 1926, Mitchell moved to Football League Third Division North outfit Nelson for a fee of £50. Described by the local newspaper as "an adaptable and clever player," he made his debut for the club in the 1–2 defeat by Wigan Borough on 28 August 1926. He kept his place in the starting line-up for the majority of the campaign, although he spent some time on the sidelines when Ambrose Harris enjoyed a run in the team mid-season. Mitchell played a total of 34 competitive matches for Nelson before leaving to join Bristol Rovers in the summer of 1927. However, he did not make a senior appearance during his only season with Bristol, and moved into non-league football for the 1928–29 season. Mitchell had spells with Mossley, where he scored 7 goals in 33 league games, before moving to Lancashire Combination side Great Harwood and finally Fleetwood Windsor Villa.
