= James Pearson (footballer, born 1905) =

English footballer

Personal information
- Full name: James Stevens Pearson
- Date of birth: 1905
- Place of birth: Heywood, England
- Date of death: 24 January 1962 (aged 56–57)
- Place of death: Blackpool, England
- Height: 5 ft 8 in (1.73 m)
- Position: Full back

Senior career*
Years	Team	Apps	(Gls)
19xx–1925	Heywood	?	(?)
1925–1928	Nelson	38	(0)
1928–1929	Hurst	30	(0)
1929–1932	Newark Town	?	(?)
1932–19xx	Runcorn	?	(?)
- * Club domestic league appearances and goals

James Stevens Pearson (1905 – 24 January 1962) was an English professional footballer who played as a full back. He was born in Heywood, Lancashire, and began his career in non-League football with his hometown club in the early 1920s. In April 1925, Pearson joined Football League Third Division North side Nelson, initially as an amateur, although he was offered a professional contract in September of the same year. He made his debut for Nelson on 3 October 1925 in the 0–1 defeat away at Coventry City and appeared in the following five matches, but then spent the majority of the 1925–26 season in the reserve team. During the 1926–27 campaign, Pearson was more involved in first-team activities and appeared in more than half of Nelson's league fixtures, although he was never able to properly displace club captain Clem Rigg from the left-back berth. He returned to the reserves for the 1927–28 season, making only seven senior appearances. Following a disappointing campaign in which the team finished bottom of the division, Nelson retained only six of their professional squad in the summer of 1928, and Pearson was one of several players to leave the club.

Pearson subsequently returned to non-League football with Hurst of the Cheshire County League. He made his debut for the club on 25 August 1928 away at Macclesfield. Pearson was Hurst's first-choice left-back for much of his year with the club and played 30 matches for the first team during the campaign. In September 1929, he left Hurst to sign for Newark Town, where he remained for three seasons before joining Runcorn in September 1932.

Pearson was the cousin of Ernie Braidwood, who also played professional football for Nelson, Oldham Athletic and Rochdale. He died in Blackpool, Lancashire, on 24 January 1962.
