= Buchanan Sharp =

Scottish footballer

Personal information
- Full name: Buchanan Sharp
- Date of birth: 2 November 1894
- Place of birth: Alexandria, Scotland
- Date of death: 11 January 1956 (aged 61)
- Place of death: Bolton, England
- Height: 5 ft 11 in (1.80 m)
- Position: Inside forward

Senior career*
Years	Team	Apps	(Gls)
- Clydebank Juniors
- Vale of Leven
1919–1923	Chelsea	65	(30)
1923–1925	Tottenham Hotspur	3	(0)
1925–1926	Leicester City	12	(2)
1926–1928	Nelson	80	(35)
1928	Southport	4	(1)
- * Club domestic league appearances and goals

Buchanan Sharp (2 November 1894 – 11 January 1956) was a Scottish professional footballer who played for Clydebank Juniors, Vale of Leven, Chelsea, Tottenham Hotspur, Leicester City, Nelson and Southport.

== Career ==
Sharp began his career with Clydebank Juniors before playing for Vale of Leven. In 1921 he joined Chelsea where he scored 23 goals in 72 appearances overall and was joint top scorer with Harry Ford in the 1922–23 season with 10 goals. The inside forward signed for Tottenham Hotspur in March 1923 and played in three matches for the Spurs. After leaving White Hart Lane, Sharp had spells with Leicester City and Nelson where he featured in 80 matches and scored on 35 occasions. He joined Southport in 1928 and made a further four appearances, scoring once, before ending his footballing career.

== Personal life ==
His uncle James Sharp was also a footballer.
