= 2024–25 South West Peninsula League =

Football competition in England

The 2024–25 South West Peninsula League season was the 18th in the history of the South West Peninsula League, a football competition in England, that feeds the Premier Division of the Western Football League. The league was formed in 2007 from the merger of the Devon County League and the South Western League and mainly features clubs based in Cornwall and Devon. The two divisions of the South West Peninsula League are on the same level of the National League System as the Western League Division One (Step 6).

The constitution was announced on 17 May 2024.

== Premier Division East ==
South West Peninsula League
- Champions: Sidmouth Town
- Promoted: Sidmouth Town

Premier Division East featured 16 teams, reduced from 17 the previous season, after Ivybridge Town were promoted to the Western League Premier Division, and Dartmouth were relegated.

One club joined the division:

- Middlezoy Rovers, transferred from Western League Division One.

=== League table ===
Pos	Team	Pld	W	D	L	GF	GA	GD	Pts	Promotion or relegation
1	Sidmouth Town (C, P)	30	24	3	3	93	27	+66	75	Promoted to the Western League Premier Division
2	Newton Abbot Spurs	30	20	4	6	77	35	+42	64	
3	Bridport	30	18	5	7	87	47	+40	59	
4	Cullompton Rangers	30	17	6	7	81	52	+29	57	
5	Elburton Villa	30	18	3	9	76	52	+24	57	Transferred to Premier Division West
6	Stoke Gabriel & Torbay Police	30	14	5	11	77	50	+27	47	
7	Okehampton Argyle	30	14	5	11	67	56	+11	47	
8	Bovey Tracey	30	14	3	13	55	65	−10	45	
9	Torridgeside	30	12	5	13	58	59	−1	41	
10	Crediton United	30	12	5	13	56	61	−5	41	
11	Middlezoy Rovers	30	11	3	16	50	68	−18	36	
12	Honiton Town	30	7	9	14	42	60	−18	30	
13	Teignmouth	30	8	4	18	30	67	−37	28	
14	Bishops Lydeard	30	8	4	18	30	68	−38	28	Reprieved from relegation
15	Torrington	30	6	2	22	37	77	−40	20	Reprieved from relegation
16	Axminster Town	30	3	2	25	32	104	−72	11 (Note: Axminster Town had three points deducted for failing to fulfil their fixture at home to Bovey Tracey on 9 August 2024, although these three points were later restored. Bovey Tracey were awarded the three points. They also failed to fulfil their fixture at Elburton Villa on 7 April 2025. Elburton were awarded the three points.)	Reprieved from relegation

Source: SWPL.co.uk
Rules for classification: 1) points; 2) goal difference; 3) number of goals scored.
(C) Champions; (P) Promoted

=== Results table ===
Home \ Away	AXM	BLY	BOV	BRP	CRE	CUL	ELB	HON	MID	NAS	OKE	SID	STK	TEI	TRS	TRT
Axminster Town	—	1–2	A/W	0–4	2–4	0–11	3–0	1–2	1–3	2–6	3–5	2–5	0–3	0–3	0–4	4–3
Bishops Lydeard	1–4	—	0–1	2–3	1–1	2–2	0–5	2–2	1–0	1–2	1–0	1–1	1–3	1–2	1–4	1–0
Bovey Tracey	4–1	3–1	—	2–4	4–3	1–2	1–8	1–1	3–1	0–2	0–2	3–2	5–2	0–1	2–2	3–0
Bridport	4–2	0–1	4–0	—	6–3	0–2	6–3	1–1	7–1	3–3	5–1	2–3	3–2	0–2	4–2	6–0
Crediton United	2–1	1–0	1–1	1–4	—	1–7	3–5	1–2	3–1	1–5	0–1	0–2	0–2	2–0	1–2	2–1
Cullompton Rangers	3–0	7–0	0–1	2–2	3–2	—	3–1	1–1	2–3	2–1	0–4	1–0	5–2	5–0	4–2	1–1
Elburton Villa	H/W	5–1	4–1	2–1	0–0	1–2	—	3–2	3–4	1–2	2–2	1–2	3–1	3–1	5–3	2–1
Honiton Town	2–2	1–3	1–3	1–1	2–3	1–2	1–2	—	3–1	2–3	2–2	0–2	0–2	2–1	2–1	3–0
Middlezoy Rovers	5–0	2–0	2–3	0–2	0–2	1–2	1–3	1–1	—	0–3	2–2	0–2	2–0	2–0	1–1	2–1
Newton Abbot Spurs	3–0	3–0	4–0	1–3	1–1	2–2	4–0	4–1	1–2	—	2–1	2–0	2–1	4–0	3–1	5–1
Okehampton Argyle	4–1	6–1	2–4	3–1	3–5	3–1	0–2	4–1	5–3	0–4	—	1–3	2–2	5–0	2–0	1–1
Sidmouth Town	6–0	2–1	3–0	2–2	3–1	6–0	3–0	4–0	6–1	5–1	3–0	—	6–2	1–1	2–0	4–1
Stoke Gabriel & Torbay Police	8–0	1–2	4–0	1–3	1–1	4–2	2–2	5–0	5–1	1–0	2–3	2–3	—	4–0	1–1	3–0
Teignmouth	1–1	1–2	3–2	1–3	0–2	0–0	0–3	1–3	1–3	1–1	2–0	1–4	0–6	—	2–4	2–1
Torridgeside	3–0	3–0	3–2	1–3	0–5	6–2	1–4	2–2	2–1	3–0	0–1	1–4	1–1	2–1	—	0–1
Torrington	3–1	2–0	2–5	2–0	0–3	4–5	1–3	1–0	2–3	0–3	3–2	0–4	2–4	1–2	2–3	—

Source: SWPL.co.uk
Legend: Blue = home team win; Yellow = draw; Red = away team win.

=== Stadia and locations ===
Locations of the 2024–25 South West Peninsula League Premier Division East teams
Locations of the 2024–25 South West Peninsula League Premier Division East teams (Dorset)

Team	Location	Stadium	Capacity
Axminster Town	Axminster	Tiger Way	3,000
Bishops Lydeard	Bishops Lydeard	Darby Way	1,000
Bovey Tracey	Bovey Tracey	Mill Marsh Park	3,000
Bridport	Bridport	St Mary's Field	2,000
Crediton United	Crediton	Lords Meadow	3,000
Cullompton Rangers	Cullompton	Speeds Meadow	1,000
Elburton Villa	Plymouth	Haye Road	2,000
Honiton Town	Honiton	Mountbatten Park	800
Middlezoy Rovers	Westonzoyland	Ethan Berry Pavilion	1,000
Newton Abbot Spurs	Newton Abbot	Recreation Ground	3,000
Okehampton Argyle	Okehampton	Simmons Park	2,500
Sidmouth Town	Sidmouth	Manstone Lane	2,500
Stoke Gabriel & Torbay Police	Stoke Gabriel	G.J. Churchward Memorial Ground	1,000
Teignmouth	Teignmouth	Coombe Valley	2,000
Torridgeside	Great Torrington	Donnacroft	1,000
Torrington	Great Torrington	Vicarage Field	500

== Premier Division West ==
South West Peninsula League
- Champions: Newquay
- Promoted: Newquay

Premier Division West featured 16 teams, reduced from 17 the previous season, after A.F.C. St Austell were promoted to the Western League Premier Division, and Mullion and St Dennis took voluntary demotion.

Two clubs joined the division:

- Millbrook, relegated from the Western League Premier Division
- St Day, promoted from the St Piran Football League Premier Division West.
- Reserve and development teams were not eligible for promotion to step 5.

=== League table ===
Pos	Team	Pld	W	D	L	GF	GA	GD	Pts	Promotion or relegation
1	Newquay (C, P)	30	24	2	4	84	18	+66	74	Promoted to the Western League Premier Division
2	Liskeard Athletic	30	23	3	4	76	31	+45	72	
3	Dobwalls	30	19	4	7	64	33	+31	61	
4	Wendron United	30	17	2	11	70	43	+27	53	
5	Callington Town	30	15	7	8	49	34	+15	52	
6	Penzance	30	13	10	7	45	36	+9	49	
7	Holsworthy	30	11	7	12	29	28	+1	40	
8	Wadebridge Town	30	11	6	13	57	62	−5	39	
9	Truro City Reserves	30	12	3	15	49	54	−5	39	
10	Camelford	30	10	8	12	43	52	−9	38	
11	Sticker	30	8	9	13	44	59	−15	33	
12	St Day	30	8	5	17	53	69	−16	29	
13	Bodmin Town	30	8	5	17	39	81	−42	29	Voluntary demotion to the St Piran League
14	Bude Town	30	7	5	18	34	57	−23	26	Reprieved from relegation
15	Millbrook	30	6	6	18	38	65	−27	24	Reprieved from relegation
16	Launceston	30	4	6	20	31	83	−52	18	Reprieved from relegation

Source: SWPL.co.uk
Rules for classification: 1) points; 2) goal difference; 3) number of goals scored.
(C) Champions; (P) Promoted

=== Results table ===
Home \ Away	BOD	BUD	CAL	CAM	DOB	HOL	LAU	LIS	MIL	NQY	PNZ	DAY	STI	TRU	WAD	WEN
Bodmin Town		2–4	2–2	0–3	0–3	2–1	3–2	2–0	3–1	1–4	0–3	2–1	3–3	1–4	0–3	0–1
Bude Town	3–0		0–1	1–0	1–3	1–3	6–2	2–6	1–2	2–1	0–2	0–1	1–1	3–0	1–3	0–3
Callington Town	6–1	2–1		4–1	0–2	0–0	1–1	1–6	6–0	1–1	2–0	1–0	5–0	1–0	3–0	1–0
Camelford	2–2	1–1	1–1		0–3	1–2	4–0	0–2	1–1	1–4	1–1	3–0	0–2	2–1	4–1	3–0
Dobwalls	4–0	0–0	2–1	0–2		1–0	4–0	1–2	4–0	1–0	1–1	4–1	2–1	5–2	5–0	2–1
Holsworthy	1–0	1–0	0–1	0–1	3–0		1–1	2–0	1–1	0–1	0–0	2–1	3–1	1–0	2–3	1–0
Launceston	3–2	1–1	0–1	2–3	2–2	0–0		0–3	2–0	1–7	0–2	2–1	0–3	1–3	2–2	0–3
Liskeard Athletic	9–2	1–0	2–0	1–1	2–1	0–0	3–0		2–1	2–1	3–1	5–2	3–0	4–1	1–0	2–0
Millbrook	2–2	4–0	1–2	3–1	0–0	2–1	5–0	0–5		1–2	1–3	1–2	2–2	0–1	2–3	0–2
Newquay	7–0	6–0	1–0	2–1	0–1	3–1	3–1	3–0	4–0		5–1	3–1	5–1	2–0	1–0	5–0
Penzance	1–1	2–0	2–0	3–1	2–0	2–0	0–2	3–4	3–1	0–2		1–1	2–1	1–0	1–1	1–1
St Day	0–4	1–1	3–3	4–0	2–4	3–1	6–1	0–2	3–0	0–4	3–1		2–2	3–6	3–5	2–2
Sticker	1–2	2–3	1–0	1–1	5–3	0–0	3–2	0–1	1–1	0–0	2–2	1–0		2–3	3–2	1–2
Truro City Reserves	0–1	2–1	0–0	2–3	0–1	2–1	4–1	0–1	3–4	0–4	0–0	3–1	0–1		2–2	5–4
Wadebridge Town	3–1	2–0	1–3	1–1	2–3	0–1	2–1	2–2	1–0	1–2	2–2	4–3	6–1	2–3		1–2
Wendron United	4–0	2–0	5–0	7–0	3–2	1–0	5–1	5–2	4–2	0–1	1–2	1–3	3–2	1–2	7–2	

Source: SWPL.co.uk
Legend: Blue = home team win; Yellow = draw; Red = away team win.

=== Stadia and locations ===
Locations of the 2024–25 South West Peninsula League Premier Division West teams

Team	Location	Stadium	Capacity
Bodmin Town	Bodmin	Priory Park	5,000
Bude Town	Bude	Broadclose Park	2,000
Callington Town	Callington	Marshfield Parc	1,000
Camelford	Camelford	Trefrew Park	1,000
Dobwalls	Dobwalls	Lantoom Park	2,000
Holsworthy	Holsworthy	Upcott Field	2,000
Launceston	Launceston	Pennygillam	1,000
Liskeard Athletic	Liskeard	Lux Park	2,000
Millbrook	Millbrook	Jenkins Park	1,000
Newquay	Newquay	Mount Wise Stadium	5,000
Penzance	Penzance	Penlee Park	1,100
St Day	St Day	Vogue Park	
Sticker	Sticker	Burngullow Lane	2,000
Truro City reserves	Helston	Kellaway Park (groundshare with Helston Athletic)	1,300
Wadebridge Town	Wadebridge	Bodieve Park	1,500
Wendron United	Wendron	Underlane	1,000
