= 2026–27 South West Peninsula League =

Football competition in England

The 2026–27 South West Peninsula League season will be the 20th in the history of the South West Peninsula League, a football competition in England, that feeds the Premier Division of the Western Football League. The league was formed in 2007 from the merger of the Devon County League and the South Western League and mainly features clubs based in Cornwall and Devon. The two divisions of the South West Peninsula League are on the same level of the National League System as the Western League Division One (Step 6).

The constitution was announced on 14 May 2026.

== Premier Division East ==
South West Peninsula League

Premier Division East features 17 teams, increased from 16 the previous season, after Bovey Tracey were promoted to the Western League Premier Division.

Two clubs joined the division:

- Elburton Villa, transferred from Premier Division West.
- University of Exeter, promoted from the Devon League.

=== League table ===
Pos	Team	Pld	W	D	L	GF	GA	GD	Pts	Promotion or relegation
1	Cullompton Rangers	16	15	1	0	66	13	+53	46	Promotion to the Western League
2	Elburton Villa	14	10	2	2	49	17	+32	32	
3	Ilminster Town	15	10	2	3	38	23	+15	32	
4	Torridgeside	14	10	1	3	46	20	+26	31	
5	Ilfracombe Town	15	10	1	4	32	19	+13	31	
6	Stoke Gabriel & Torbay Police	16	8	4	4	41	24	+17	28	
7	University of Exeter	17	7	2	8	43	40	+3	23	
8	Bridport	16	7	1	8	36	28	+8	22	
9	Bishops Lydeard	16	7	0	9	23	35	−12	21	
10	Honiton Town	14	6	2	6	24	17	+7	20	
11	Teignmouth	17	5	3	9	24	34	−10	18	
12	Crediton United	17	4	6	7	21	31	−10	18	
13	Middlezoy Rovers	14	5	2	7	24	32	−8	17	
14	Newton Abbot Spurs	16	4	4	8	27	36	−9	16	
15	Torrington	15	5	0	10	24	41	−17	15	Possible relegation to a feeder league
16	Axminster Town	16	2	1	13	20	60	−40	7	Possible relegation to a feeder league
17	Okehampton Argyle	18	2	0	16	20	88	−68	5 (Note: Okehampton Argyle had one point deducted for failing to fulfil their fixture at Ilminster Town on 28 August 2026. Ilminster were awarded the three points.)	Possible relegation to a feeder league

Updated to match(es) played on 22:14, 21 November 2026 (UTC). Source: SWPL.co.uk
Rules for classification: 1) points; 2) goal difference; 3) number of goals scored.

=== Results table ===
Home \ Away	AXM	BLY	BRP	CRE	CUL	ELB	HON	ILF	ILM	MID	NAS	OKE	STK	TEI	TRS	TRT	UOE
Axminster Town	—		3–2		0–5				2–4		2–2		2–3			3–4	0–5
Bishops Lydeard	5–0	—		2–0	1–2	0–6	0–3	1–2			2–1			3–1			
Bridport	3–0	0–1	—		0–3		0–1	2–3		3–0		7–2		4–2	1–4		1–2
Crediton United	2–0		1–1	—						3–3	4–1	4–0	1–2	0–0			1–1
Cullompton Rangers		1–0			—	3–3	2–0		5–2	3–0		14–1	4–1	6–0		3–1	6–3
Elburton Villa				5–0		—		2–1	3–1		4–1			4–1	2–3	6–0	2–2
Honiton Town		5–1		0–0		3–1	—		1–2		4–1			2–1			
Ilfracombe Town	6–1			2–0			1–1	—						1–0	1–2	4–0	2–0
Ilminster Town	3–2	3–0		2–2			1–0	0–1	—	7–0		H/W		3–2			
Middlezoy Rovers			3–2		1–3		4–3	3–4		—		5–0	1–0			2–0	1–2
Newton Abbot Spurs			1–3		0–2	1–3				1–1	—	5–2	0–0				1–3
Okehampton Argyle	1–4	0–4		2–3		0–5						—	1–6		0–7	1–2	4–0
Stoke Gabriel & Torbay Police							2–1	0–1	2–2		4–4	12–1	—	2–1	1–3		
Teignmouth	5–0		1–5	1–0			1–0			1–0		3–1	1–1	—	2–2		
Torridgeside	3–1	0–2		4–0	0–4			4–1			0–3	7–0			—		7–2
Torrington		6–1	0–2	5–0				3–2	0–4		1–2	0–4	0–2			—	
University of Exeter	7–0	5–0				1–3			3–4		1–3		1–3			5–2	—

Updated to match(es) played on 22:16, 21 November 2026 (UTC). Source: SWPL.co.uk
Legend: Blue = home team win; Yellow = draw; Red = away team win.

== Premier Division West ==
South West Peninsula League

Premier Division West features 17 teams, increased from 16 the previous season, after Liskeard Athletic were promoted to the Western League Premier Division, Elburton Villa were transferred to Premier Division East, and St Day and Truro City Reserves resigned from the league.

Five clubs joined the division:

- A.F.C. St Austell, expelled from the Western League Premier Division.
- Helston Athletic, voluntary demotion from the Western League Premier Division.
- Mousehole, voluntary demotion from Southern League Division One South.
- Hayle, promoted from St Piran League Premier Division West.
- St Mawgan, promoted from St Piran League Premier Division East.
- Reserve and development teams are ineligible for promotion to step 5.
- Helston Athletic and Mousehole are ineligible for immediate promotion after their voluntary demotions.

=== League table ===
Pos	Team	Pld	W	D	L	GF	GA	GD	Pts	Promotion or relegation
1	Penzance	16	13	3	0	41	8	+33	42	Promotion to the Western League
2	A.F.C. St Austell	17	12	3	2	45	15	+30	39	
3	Sticker	16	12	0	4	52	13	+39	36	
4	Camelford	16	11	2	3	29	21	+8	35	
5	Callington Town	14	11	0	3	40	17	+23	33	
6	Holsworthy	18	8	4	6	28	25	+3	28	
7	Falmouth Town Reserves	17	7	3	7	29	27	+2	24	
8	Helston Athletic	17	7	3	7	27	30	−3	24	
9	St Mawgan	16	7	2	7	28	29	−1	23	
10	Bude Town	15	6	3	6	27	26	+1	21	
11	Wadebridge Town	16	4	5	7	23	29	−6	17	
12	Hayle	13	5	1	7	17	25	−8	16	
13	Launceston	17	4	4	9	25	47	−22	16	
14	Millbrook	17	3	2	12	13	37	−24	11	
15	Mousehole	15	2	3	10	16	32	−16	9	Possible relegation to a feeder league
16	Dobwalls	17	2	2	13	20	41	−21	8	Possible relegation to a feeder league
17	Wendron United	17	2	2	13	10	48	−38	8	Possible relegation to a feeder league

Updated to match(es) played on 22:21, 21 November 2026 (UTC). Source: SWPL.co.uk
Rules for classification: 1) points; 2) goal difference; 3) number of goals scored.

=== Results table ===
Home \ Away	STA	BUD	CAL	CAM	DOB	FAL	HAY	HEL	HOL	LAU	MIL	MOU	PNZ	STM	STI	WAD	WEN
A.F.C. St Austell		1–0			2–0			4–0	5–0		5–0	2–1	0–1	5–1			4–0
Bude Town			2–3	3–0	1–3	0–1				3–3	2–2				2–1		2–1
Callington Town	4–2	2–1		4–0	4–1								1–2		1–3	2–1	5–0
Camelford			1–4		2–1	2–0	3–1		1–1	2–0				2–0	1–0		
Dobwalls		0–2		1–2				0–3	0–1	3–3			1–3		1–6		
Falmouth Town Reserves	2–4		3–2		3–1			2–0	2–1	2–2				4–0			
Hayle	1–1	2–3				2–0					3–0	2–1	1–3	0–4	1–3		
Helston Athletic	0–1		0–2	3–3		3–2						2–2		2–0		2–0	6–1
Holsworthy	0–2		1–2			3–0		1–1		2–3	1–0	4–0	1–1			2–2	3–0
Launceston				1–3	2–6	2–2	2–0	1–0	1–2		2–0			1–2			
Millbrook			0–4	2–3				0–1	1–2			2–1			0–3	1–0	1–2
Mousehole				0–2	1–1	0–4	0–2			4–1				1–3			1–1
Penzance	1–1	5–1				1–1	4–0	5–1		7–0	3–0			2–0			
St Mawgan	1–3	1–1			2–1				0–3		4–0				4–2	1–1	
Sticker						2–0		5–0	4–0	5–1		3–0	0–1			6–1	5–0
Wadebridge Town	3–3	1–4			2–0	2–1	1–2			4–0	1–1	3–2	0–1				
Wendron United				0–2	2–0						0–3	0–2	0–1	1–5	0–4	1–1	

Updated to match(es) played on 22:23, 21 November 2026 (UTC). Source: SWPL.co.uk
Legend: Blue = home team win; Yellow = draw; Red = away team win.
