= 2023–24 South West Peninsula League =

Football competition in England

The 2023–24 South West Peninsula League season was the 17th in the history of the South West Peninsula League, a football competition in England, that feeds the Premier Division of the Western Football League. The league was formed in 2007 from the merger of the Devon County League and the South Western League and, with the exceptions of Bishops Lydeard in Somerset and Bridport in Dorset, features clubs based in Cornwall and Devon. The two divisions of the South West Peninsula League are on the same level of the National League System as the Western League Division One (Step 6).

The constitution was announced on 15 May 2023.

== Premier Division East ==
South West Peninsula League
- Champions: Ivybridge Town
- Promoted: Ivybridge Town

Premier Division East featured 17 teams, reduced from 19 the previous season, after Brixham were promoted to the Western League Premier Division; Holsworthy were transferred to Premier Division West, and Plymouth Marjon and Elmore were relegated.

Two clubs joined the division:

- Bishops Lydeard, transferred from Western League Division One.
- Stoke Gabriel & Torbay Police, promoted from the Devon Football League South & West Division.

=== League table ===
Pos	Team	Pld	W	D	L	GF	GA	GD	Pts	Promotion or relegation
1	Ivybridge Town (C, P)	32	27	3	2	113	22	+91	84	Promoted to the Western League Premier Division
2	Bovey Tracey	32	16	10	6	83	42	+41	58	
3	Axminster Town	32	16	10	6	68	41	+27	58	
4	Bridport	32	17	6	9	70	56	+14	57	
5	Okehampton Argyle	32	16	8	8	61	39	+22	56	
6	Newton Abbot Spurs	32	16	8	8	75	58	+17	56	
7	Crediton United	32	16	7	9	71	50	+21	55	
8	Elburton Villa	32	15	9	8	52	35	+17	54	
9	Sidmouth Town	32	14	6	12	69	58	+11	48	
10	Cullompton Rangers	32	14	5	13	56	50	+6	47	
11	Teignmouth	32	11	10	11	61	68	−7	43	
12	Torrington	32	10	6	16	39	55	−16	36	
13	Stoke Gabriel & Torbay Police	32	9	5	18	55	76	−21	32	
14	Honiton Town	32	5	13	14	52	82	−30	28	
15	Torridgeside	32	5	5	22	32	92	−60	20	Reprieved from relegation
16	Bishops Lydeard	32	4	3	25	40	94	−54	15	Reprieved from relegation
17	Dartmouth (R)	32	2	4	26	25	104	−79	10	Relegated to the Devon League

Source: SWPL.co.uk
Rules for classification: 1) points; 2) goal difference; 3) number of goals scored.
(C) Champions; (P) Promoted; (R) Relegated

=== Results table ===
Home \ Away	AXM	BLY	BOV	BRP	CRE	CUL	DAR	ELB	HON	IVY	NAS	OKE	SID	STK	TEI	TRS	TRT
Axminster Town	—	7–0	1–1	2–1	1–1	3–0	4–0	2–0	3–1	1–5	2–0	3–0	5–4	2–0	1–1	5–0	4–1
Bishops Lydeard	0–2	—	2–4	0–2	2–2	1–2	4–1	0–3	0–1	0–2	1–1	0–2	2–3	3–2	2–2	3–1	1–2
Bovey Tracey	1–1	5–0	—	3–3	4–0	1–4	4–0	2–2	5–1	1–4	2–2	0–1	3–1	4–0	5–1	5–0	4–1
Bridport	0–0	2–1	3–2	—	6–3	3–1	6–2	2–2	3–2	1–3	3–2	0–5	0–1	2–0	3–2	2–0	2–1
Crediton United	2–1	5–0	3–1	2–1	—	1–1	4–0	3–3	6–2	0–3	1–1	1–1	0–3	2–0	4–1	2–1	0–1
Cullompton Rangers	4–3	3–0	1–1	1–1	1–3	—	5–0	0–1	1–1	1–4	2–1	3–0	3–2	2–1	2–3	1–0	1–0
Dartmouth	1–4	4–1	0–5	2–4	0–4	0–7	—	1–1	1–1	2–4	1–3	2–0	1–1	1–3	2–2	0–2	0–5
Elburton Villa	1–1	3–0	1–2	2–2	1–0	3–0	3–0	—	3–1	2–3	0–3	0–2	3–0	1–0	2–1	3–0	2–1
Honiton Town	2–2	4–1	1–1	1–1	2–6	2–2	2–1	0–4	—	0–2	4–5	0–0	2–2	1–5	4–4	2–2	2–2
Ivybridge Town	6–0	7–0	1–1	2–0	5–1	2–0	6–0	2–0	6–1	—	4–1	1–1	3–1	7–0	1–0	6–2	7–0
Newton Abbot Spurs	0–0	3–1	2–3	2–1	2–2	3–2	5–1	3–1	3–1	0–4	—	1–3	3–3	4–3	1–1	5–3	2–0
Okehampton Argyle	1–0	4–0	1–1	1–2	3–1	2–0	4–0	0–0	3–0	0–3	1–3	—	1–3	4–3	2–4	1–1	1–1
Sidmouth Town	4–2	2–1	0–1	1–3	0–2	4–0	4–0	1–2	2–2	3–2	1–2	2–5	—	1–1	4–3	4–0	0–0
Stoke Gabriel & Torbay Police	2–2	3–2	2–3	4–3	1–4	2–1	3–1	1–1	4–1	1–1	1–4	1–3	1–4	—	3–3	6–2	0–1
Teignmouth	2–2	6–5	3–1	4–6	1–3	1–0	H/W	1–0	0–0	2–1	1–0	2–2	3–1	1–2	—	3–2	2–4
Torridgeside	0–1	1–5	0–7	1–0	0–3	0–2	2–1	0–0	1–5	0–5	3–6	0–3	2–4	3–0	0–0	—	2–2
Torrington	0–1	3–2	0–0	1–2	1–0	1–3	1–0	1–2	1–3	0–1	2–2	1–4	0–3	2–0	3–1	0–1	—

Source: SWPL.co.uk
Legend: Blue = home team win; Yellow = draw; Red = away team win.

=== Stadia and locations ===
Locations of the 2023–24 South West Peninsula League Premier Division East teams
Locations of the 2023–24 South West Peninsula League Premier Division East teams (Dorset)

Team	Location	Stadium	Capacity
Axminster Town	Axminster	Tiger Way	3,000
Bishops Lydeard	Bishops Lydeard	Darby Way	1,000
Bovey Tracey	Bovey Tracey	Mill Marsh Park	3,000
Bridport	Bridport	St Mary's Field	2,000
Crediton United	Crediton	Lords Meadow	3,000
Cullompton Rangers	Cullompton	Speeds Meadow	1,000
Dartmouth	Dartmouth	Long Cross	1,000
Elburton Villa	Plymouth	Haye Road	2,000
Honiton Town	Honiton	Mountbatten Park	800
Ivybridge Town	Ivybridge	Erme Valley	2,000
Newton Abbot Spurs	Newton Abbot	Recreation Ground	3,000
Okehampton Argyle	Okehampton	Simmons Park	2,500
Sidmouth Town	Sidmouth	Manstone Lane	2,500
Stoke Gabriel & Torbay Police	Stoke Gabriel	G.J. Churchward Memorial Ground	1,000
Teignmouth	Teignmouth	Coombe Valley	2,000
Torridgeside	Great Torrington	Donnacroft	1,000
Torrington	Great Torrington	Vicarage Field	500

== Premier Division West ==
South West Peninsula League
- Champions: AFC St Austell
- Promoted: AFC St Austell

Premier Division West featured 17 teams, the same as the previous season, after St Blazey were promoted to the Western League Premier Division, and Godolphin Atlantic (Newquay) folded.

Two clubs joined the division:

- Holsworthy, transferred from Premier Division East
- Truro City Reserves, promoted from the St Piran Football League West Division.
- Reserve and development teams were not eligible for promotion to step 5.

=== League table ===
Pos	Team	Pld	W	D	L	GF	GA	GD	Pts	Promotion or relegation
1	A.F.C. St Austell (C, P)	32	28	1	3	110	33	+77	85	Promoted to the Western League Premier Division
2	Liskeard Athletic	32	26	3	3	127	30	+97	81	
3	Wadebridge Town	32	21	2	9	73	46	+27	65	
4	Newquay	32	19	6	7	66	36	+30	63	
5	Wendron United	32	19	5	8	87	56	+31	62	
6	Dobwalls	32	16	4	12	77	50	+27	52	
7	Callington Town	32	14	4	14	72	66	+6	46	
8	Camelford	32	12	9	11	54	53	+1	45	
9	Penzance	32	13	6	13	50	56	−6	45	
10	Launceston	32	13	5	14	63	65	−2	44	
11	Holsworthy	32	11	5	16	41	51	−10	38	
12	Bude Town	32	11	5	16	69	82	−13	34 (Note: Sticker 0–3 Bude Town (2 March 2024) – Bude Town had four points deducted for fielding an ineligible player..)	
13	Bodmin Town	32	9	2	21	39	92	−53	29	
14	Mullion	32	8	4	20	69	88	−19	28	Voluntary demotion to the St Piran League
15	Truro City Reserves	32	8	1	23	39	98	−59	25	Reprieved from relegation
16	St Dennis	32	6	2	24	39	112	−73	20	Voluntary demotion to the St Piran League
17	Sticker	32	3	6	23	32	93	−61	18 (Note: Sticker 0–3 Bude Town (2 March 2024) – Sticker were awarded three points after Bude Town fielded an ineligible player.)	Reprieved from relegation

Source: SWPL.co.uk
Rules for classification: 1) points; 2) goal difference; 3) number of goals scored.
(C) Champions; (P) Promoted

=== Results table ===
Home \ Away	STA	BOD	BUD	CAL	CAM	DOB	HOL	LAU	LIS	MUL	NQY	PNZ	STD	STI	TRU	WAD	WEN
A.F.C. St Austell		1–3	3–2	6–0	2–0	2–0	2–0	3–1	6–2	2–1	1–2	4–2	4–0	3–1	6–0	4–2	1–5
Bodmin Town	1–5		1–1	1–6	4–1	0–6	0–1	4–3	1–3	1–0	1–4	0–1	1–0	2–0	2–3	0–2	1–6
Bude Town	0–4	3–1		0–4	1–2	1–6	1–0	6–0	2–2	5–3	0–4	1–3	1–1	4–2	4–1	2–3	1–4
Callington Town	0–6	4–1	1–4		2–2	1–2	3–1	2–3	1–3	1–1	2–3	1–0	2–3	2–1	5–1	2–4	1–0
Camelford	0–2	3–3	3–0	1–4		2–1	3–1	3–1	0–5	0–0	2–2	1–1	2–0	1–1	5–1	2–2	0–2
Dobwalls	0–3	4–2	4–0	2–3	1–2		2–2	3–3	0–4	6–2	2–0	1–2	3–0	2–0	5–0	4–2	2–3
Holsworthy	1–2	3–0	0–0	5–1	0–3	1–0		2–3	1–0	0–0	1–1	2–0	1–2	2–0	0–2	0–1	1–1
Launceston	2–4	6–0	0–5	1–2	2–0	1–1	1–2		0–7	5–1	0–0	3–3	3–0	2–2	3–2	1–2	0–1
Liskeard Athletic	3–3	4–0	8–2	2–0	5–2	2–0	8–0	2–1		8–1	1–2	1–0	5–2	3–0	7–0	2–1	2–0
Mullion	1–7	3–4	6–2	3–1	2–3	3–4	1–3	0–2	2–7		0–3	5–1	7–0	4–1	5–2	2–3	3–0
Newquay	0–3	5–0	5–1	1–3	1–0	0–1	2–1	4–0	1–1	1–0		2–1	4–0	5–2	1–0	0–3	2–3
Penzance	0–4	3–1	3–1	2–2	1–1	1–2	2–0	0–3	0–2	4–1	0–3		2–1	3–0	3–0	3–2	3–1
St Dennis	0–4	0–1	0–4	0–8	0–3	0–6	2–0	0–5	1–7	4–2	3–4	2–2		4–2	1–4	0–1	2–8
Sticker	0–4	1–0	0–3	2–5	1–6	0–0	2–4	0–1	0–6	2–2	2–1	0–0	1–2		1–1	1–0	1–3
Truro City Reserves	0–3	1–2	1–6	2–1	2–1	1–3	0–3	0–3	1–6	0–5	0–1	1–2	4–3	5–3		0–2	1–3
Wadebridge Town	2–3	4–0	3–2	1–0	3–0	3–2	1–0	1–3	0–3	2–1	2–2	3–0	6–2	8–2	2–1		0–1
Wendron United	2–3	5–1	4–4	2–2	0–0	4–2	5–3	3–1	0–6	4–2	0–0	5–2	5–4	5–1	1–2	1–2	

Source: SWPL.co.uk
Legend: Blue = home team win; Yellow = draw; Red = away team win.

=== Stadia and locations ===
Locations of the 2023–24 South West Peninsula League Premier Division West teams

Team	Location	Stadium	Capacity
AFC St Austell	St Austell	Poltair Park	6,000
Bodmin Town	Bodmin	Priory Park	5,000
Bude Town	Bude	Broadclose Park	2,000
Callington Town	Callington	Marshfield Parc	1,000
Camelford	Camelford	Trefrew Park	1,000
Dobwalls	Dobwalls	Lantoom Park	2,000
Holsworthy	Holsworthy	Upcott Field	2,000
Launceston	Launceston	Pennygillam	1,000
Liskeard Athletic	Liskeard	Lux Park	2,000
Mullion	Mullion	Clifden Park	1,000
Newquay	Newquay	Mount Wise Stadium	5,000
Penzance	Penzance	Penlee Park	1,100
St Dennis	St Dennis	Boscawen Park	2,000
Sticker	Sticker	Burngullow Lane	2,000
Truro City reserves	Helston	Kellaway Park (groundshare with Helston Athletic)	1,300
Wadebridge Town	Wadebridge	Bodieve Park	1,500
Wendron United	Wendron	Underlane	1,000
