= 2017–18 South West Peninsula League =

Football competition in England

The 2017–18 South West Peninsula League season is the eleventh in the history of the South West Peninsula League, a football competition in England, that feeds the Premier Division of the Western Football League. The league had been formed in 2007 from the merger of the Devon County League and the South Western League, and is restricted to clubs based in Cornwall and Devon. The Premier Division of the South West Peninsula League is on the same level of the National League System as the Western League Division One.

The constitution was announced on 26 May 2017.

== Premier Division ==
South West Peninsula League

The Premier Division features 20 teams, the same as the previous season, after St Blazey were relegated to Division One East, and Tiverton Town Reserves left the league.

Three new clubs joined the league:

- Sticker, promoted from Division One West.
- Stoke Gabriel, promoted from Division One East.

Reserve sides are not eligible for promotion to Step 5.

Any Step 6 club without ground grading Grade G were to be relegated to Step 7. Godolphin Atlantic and Stoke Gabriel passed the ground grading requirements with a dispensation that certain works had to be completed by 30 September 2018, or those clubs will face a financial penalty. Potential demotion at the end of next season would result if they were not compliant by 31 March 2019. Stoke Gabriel subsequently sought voluntary demotion because they announced that their groundworks would not be ready by the deadline. All step 6 leagues were to be fixed at a maximum of 20 clubs for 2018–19.

- Only Plymouth Parkway applied for promotion to Step 5.

=== League table ===
Pos	Team	Pld	W	D	L	GF	GA	GD	Pts	Promotion or relegation
1	Plymouth Parkway (C, P)	38	34	3	1	147	25	+122	105	Promoted to Western League Premier Division
2	Tavistock	38	30	4	4	151	41	+110	94	
3	Falmouth Town	38	25	5	8	97	49	+48	84 (Note: Witheridge failed to raise a team for their match at Falmouth Town on 2 September and were deducted three points, with Falmouth awarded three points. The table shows a 0–0 draw.) (Note: Plymouth Argyle Reserves failed to raise a team for their match at home to Falmouth Town on 29 April and were deducted three points, with Falmouth again awarded three points. The table shows a 0–0 draw.)	
4	Saltash United	38	24	7	7	127	55	+72	79	
5	Bodmin Town	38	24	7	7	96	50	+46	79	
6	St Austell	38	21	3	14	102	78	+24	66	
7	Launceston	38	20	5	13	89	54	+35	65	
8	Plymouth Argyle Reserves	38	20	8	10	113	58	+55	64	
9	Helston Athletic	38	15	4	19	72	83	−11	49	
10	Camelford	38	14	4	20	60	94	−34	46	
11	Torpoint Athletic	38	12	9	17	63	77	−14	45	
12	Stoke Gabriel	38	15	4	19	62	94	−32	45 (Note: Stoke Gabriel failed to raise a team for their match at Sticker on 7 May and were deducted three points, with Sticker awarded three points. The table shows a 0–0 draw.)	Demoted to Division One East due to ground grading failure
13	Cullompton Rangers	38	13	5	20	60	91	−31	44	
14	Newquay	38	13	3	22	61	73	−12	42	
15	Sticker	38	9	9	20	52	83	−31	38	
16	Exmouth Town	38	10	7	21	48	91	−43	37	
17	Godolphin Atlantic	38	10	6	22	59	116	−57	36	
18	Ivybridge Town	38	10	5	23	52	92	−40	35	
19	Callington Town	38	5	5	28	45	127	−82	20 (Note: Callington Town and Witheridge reprieved from relegation.)	
20	Witheridge	38	2	5	31	34	159	−125	7	

Updated to match(es) played on 23:39, 4 June 2018 (UTC). Source: SWPL.co.uk
Rules for classification: 1) points; 2) goal difference; 3) number of goals scored.
(C) Champions; (P) Promoted

== Division One East ==
Division One East features 18 clubs, the same as the previous season, after Stoke Gabriel were promoted to the Premier Division and Exwick Villa were relegated:

- Honiton Town, promoted from the Devon & Exeter League.
- Ilfracombe Town, promoted from the North Devon League.
- Galmpton United changed their name to Galmpton & Roselands.
- Totnes & Dartington resigned from the league before the season started, but were not replaced.
- Crediton United, Ilfracombe Town and Newton Abbot Spurs applied for promotion to the Premier Division. All three passed the ground grading, but Newton Abbot later withdrew their application.

Pos	Team	Pld	W	D	L	GF	GA	GD	Pts	Relegation
1	St Martins (C)	32	26	1	5	84	34	+50	79	
2	Newton Abbot Spurs	32	25	2	5	83	26	+57	77	
3	Bovey Tracey	33	20	1	12	70	54	+16	61	
4	Budleigh Salterton	32	18	4	10	89	47	+42	58	
5	University of Exeter	32	16	5	11	79	59	+20	53	
6	Crediton United	32	16	5	11	57	46	+11	53	
7	Ilfracombe Town	33	15	5	13	52	54	−2	50	
8	Torridgeside	32	14	5	13	67	56	+11	49 (Note: Brixham failed to fulfil their fixture away at Torridgeside on 7 May 2018. The table shows a 0–0 draw, but Torridgeside were awarded three points instead of one, and Brixham were deducted three points.)	
9	Teignmouth	32	14	5	13	76	60	+16	47	
10	Axminster Town	32	12	5	15	59	69	−10	41	
11	Sidmouth Town	32	10	7	15	62	67	−5	37	
12	Appledore	32	10	6	16	49	73	−24	36	
13	Brixham	32	8	11	13	48	65	−17	31	
14	Honiton Town	32	8	5	19	54	87	−33	29	
15	Alphington	32	7	6	19	43	82	−39	27	
16	Galmpton & Roselands	32	8	2	22	43	70	−27	26	Resigned at the end of the season
17	Liverton United	32	6	3	23	34	100	−66	21	Reprieved from relegation
18	Totnes & Dartington	0	0	0	0	0	0	0	0	Resigned from the league

Updated to match(es) played on 12 May 2018. Source:
(C) Champions

== Division One West ==
Division One West features 18 clubs, the same as the previous season, after Sticker were promoted to the Premier Division, Vospers Oak Villa were relegated, and two new clubs joined:

- Ludgvan, promoted from the Cornwall Combination.
- St Blazey, relegated from the Premier Division.
- Penryn Athletic resigned from the league before the season started, but were not replaced.
- Elburton Villa, Liskeard Athletic, Millbrook, Mousehole, Porthleven, St Blazey, St Dennis, Wadebridge Town and Wendron United have applied for promotion to the Premier Division. St Blazey failed the ground grading; Millbrook, Mousehole, St Dennis and Wendron passed with dispensation, and the others passed.

Pos	Team	Pld	W	D	L	GF	GA	GD	Pts	Promotion or relegation
1	Millbrook (C, P)	32	21	7	4	100	40	+60	70	Promotion to the Premier Division
2	Ludgvan	32	22	3	7	83	45	+38	69	
3	Elburton Villa (P)	32	19	7	6	79	40	+39	64	Promotion to the Premier Division
4	Mousehole	32	19	5	8	82	51	+31	62	
5	Liskeard Athletic	32	18	6	8	92	45	+47	60	
6	Porthleven	32	18	6	8	74	51	+23	60	
7	St Blazey	32	16	4	12	66	59	+7	52	
8	St Dennis	32	15	6	11	66	73	−7	51	
9	Wadebridge Town	32	11	7	14	73	63	+10	40	
10	Penzance	32	11	4	17	64	78	−14	37	
11	Holsworthy	32	9	7	16	51	67	−16	34	
12	Plymouth Marjon	32	9	5	18	43	59	−16	32	
13	Wendron United	32	8	7	17	48	90	−42	31	
14	Dobwalls	32	10	1	21	52	99	−47	31	
15	Bude Town	33	7	3	23	43	99	−56	26 (Note: Illogan RBL failed to fulfil their fixture at home to Bude Town on 7 May 2018. The table shows a 0–0 draw, but Bude were awarded three points instead of one, and Illogan were deducted three points.)	
16	Plymstock United	32	5	8	19	47	83	−36	25 (Note: Illogan RBL failed to fulfil their fixture away at Plymstock United on 20 April 2018. The table shows a 0–0 draw, but Plymstock were awarded three points instead of one, and Illogan were deducted three points.)	
17	Illogan RBL (R)	32	6	10	16	43	64	−21	20	Relegated to Level 12
18	Penryn Athletic	0	0	0	0	0	0	0	0	Resigned from the league

Updated to match(es) played on 4 June 2018. Source:
(C) Champions; (P) Promoted; (R) Relegated

== Promotion from feeder leagues for 2018–19 ==
Several clubs have applied for promotion to the SWPL for the 2018–19 season. Their success will depend on finishing in the top three in their respective leagues and other factors including ground facilities. Clubs finishing in the top two in their leagues have the automatic right to promotion if they pass the ground grading. Clubs finishing third in their leagues, and any clubs applying from outside the football pyramid, do not have an automatic right to promotion. Only one club per league can be accepted. If two or more clubs satisfy all requirements and are considered of equal merit, the league board will decide on which club(s) to accept. If all five feeder leagues provide a club eligible for promotion, then the two clubs finishing in 17th positions in Division One East / West will be relegated.

The following clubs have applied for promotion to Division One East and West for next season. Their ground grading results are also included below:

- Cornwall Combination – Carharrack (failed)
- Devon & Exeter Football League (all passed) – Cronies (rejected), Elmore (accepted), Exwick Villa (rejected), Newtown (rejected)
- East Cornwall League – Bere Alston United (passed, accepted)
- North Devon Football League – Braunton (passed, rejected)
- South Devon Football League – Kingsteignton Athletic (passed, rejected), Waldon Athletic (passed, accepted)
- Application from outside the football pyramid structure – Torquay United Reserves (passed, withdrawn)
