= 2022–23 South West Peninsula League =

Football competition in England

The 2022–23 South West Peninsula League season was the 16th in the history of the South West Peninsula League, a football competition in England, that feeds the Premier Division of the Western Football League. The league was formed in 2007 from the merger of the Devon County League and the South Western League, and, with the exception of Bridport in Dorset, features clubs based in Cornwall and Devon. The two divisions of the South West Peninsula League are on the same level of the National League System as the Western League Division One (Step 6).

The constitution was announced on 12 May 2022.

With a view to a merger between the South West Peninsula League and the Western League in 2023–24, four clubs were to be automatically promoted from each division to Step 5, depending on ground grading. The fifth-placed clubs may also have been promoted, on a PPG (points per game) basis. However, the FA scrapped the merger in February 2023 after a breakdown in negotiations, and promotion was reverted to one club per division.

== Premier Division East ==
South West Peninsula League

Premier Division East featured 19 teams, reduced from 20 the previous season, after Torpoint Athletic were promoted to the Western League Premier Division; Stoke Gabriel & Torbay Police were relegated and Ottery St Mary resigned from the league.

Holsworthy were initially transferred to Premier Division West, but were transferred back after the reprieve of St Dennis.

Two clubs joined the division:

- Bridport, relegated from the Western League Premier Division.
- Teignmouth, promoted from the Devon Football League South & West Division.

=== League table ===
Pos	Team	Pld	W	D	L	GF	GA	GD	Pts	Promotion or relegation
1	Brixham (C, P)	36	30	4	2	112	23	+89	94	Promoted to the Western League
2	Okehampton Argyle	36	26	5	5	79	28	+51	83	
3	Crediton United	36	23	9	4	84	42	+42	78	
4	Ivybridge Town	36	21	8	7	70	37	+33	71	
5	Bovey Tracey	36	22	2	12	81	51	+30	68	
6	Axminster Town	36	18	8	10	64	53	+11	62	
7	Newton Abbot Spurs	36	17	9	10	87	51	+36	60	
8	Teignmouth	36	17	7	12	62	53	+9	58	
9	Sidmouth Town	36	17	5	14	84	68	+16	56	
10	Cullompton Rangers	36	15	3	18	62	74	−12	48	
11	Bridport	36	11	8	17	51	65	−14	41	
12	Torridgeside	36	11	7	18	65	89	−24	40	
13	Honiton Town	36	10	9	17	46	67	−21	39	
14	Dartmouth	36	12	1	23	45	84	−39	37	
15	Torrington	36	9	6	21	54	87	−33	33	
16	Elburton Villa	36	7	10	19	45	68	−23	31	
17	Holsworthy	36	8	3	25	30	72	−42	27	Reprieved and transferred to Premier Division West
18	Elmore (R)	36	5	7	24	51	111	−60	22	Relegated to the Devon League
19	Plymouth Marjon (R)	36	6	3	27	42	91	−49	21	Relegated to the Devon League

Source: SWPL.co.uk
Rules for classification: 1) points; 2) goal difference; 3) number of goals scored.
(C) Champions; (P) Promoted; (R) Relegated

=== Results table ===
Home \ Away	AXM	BOV	BRP	BRX	CRE	CUL	DAR	ELB	ELM	HOL	HON	IVY	NAS	OKE	PLY	SID	TEI	TRS	TRT
Axminster Town	—	1–0	1–3	1–2	2–2	3–1	1–0	2–0	1–1	1–0	1–1	0–2	2–1	0–4	3–2	5–4	0–0	4–1	5–2
Bovey Tracey	0–3	—	4–0	3–1	0–3	1–4	6–0	2–0	4–1	1–0	1–2	1–0	4–2	2–3	1–0	4–0	3–1	5–2	4–0
Bridport	4–2	2–7	—	1–2	2–3	0–5	0–2	2–2	2–5	2–0	0–0	1–1	1–1	0–1	3–0	0–2	3–0	1–0	2–0
Brixham	4–0	4–0	1–0	—	2–1	2–0	6–0	2–1	9–0	2–0	5–0	2–0	1–1	3–0	6–0	4–0	5–1	6–0	4–0
Crediton United	2–2	2–2	1–1	1–2	—	1–1	2–0	3–0	1–0	2–2	3–1	2–0	2–2	2–3	2–0	1–0	3–1	2–1	3–2
Cullompton Rangers	0–4	1–3	0–2	0–2	1–2	—	0–3	2–4	3–2	2–1	1–0	0–4	0–6	0–2	4–2	0–3	1–1	2–1	4–2
Dartmouth	0–1	0–1	0–1	0–2	0–2	1–4	—	4–3	4–3	1–0	2–1	0–4	1–5	0–2	1–2	0–2	2–1	1–3	1–3
Elburton Villa	0–0	2–0	2–1	2–2	0–0	2–4	2–3	—	1–1	1–3	0–2	1–2	0–1	1–1	2–1	0–5	1–5	3–4	2–2
Elmore	2–3	1–5	2–1	1–2	1–4	0–5	3–3	2–1	—	3–0	0–0	1–1	2–3	0–7	0–3	2–9	3–4	0–4	2–2
Holsworthy	1–2	2–4	1–5	0–7	0–5	1–4	1–2	0–0	2–1	—	3–4	0–1	0–4	0–1	1–0	0–1	1–0	0–1	2–1
Honiton Town	0–2	2–5	2–1	0–2	3–3	2–0	2–1	0–1	2–1	1–0	—	1–1	1–2	0–3	4–2	4–3	1–1	0–0	1–1
Ivybridge Town	2–0	0–2	1–0	3–2	1–4	2–1	2–1	3–0	5–0	0–0	1–0	—	3–2	1–1	2–0	2–3	1–1	1–0	7–2
Newton Abbot Spurs	1–2	2–1	6–0	2–2	3–4	6–1	1–2	1–1	3–1	3–1	1–1	1–1	—	2–0	1–0	1–4	4–0	9–0	1–1
Okehampton Argyle	1–1	1–0	3–0	0–2	2–1	3–0	4–1	1–0	4–1	1–2	2–1	0–3	2–0	—	0–0	2–1	2–2	2–0	6–0
Plymouth Marjon	0–5	1–2	1–5	1–2	0–2	1–3	1–2	1–0	0–5	3–1	2–1	1–3	3–4	2–3	—	1–1	2–3	3–3	3–1
Sidmouth Town	3–3	0–1	1–1	4–4	1–5	3–1	4–1	2–4	6–2	2–3	3–1	2–0	0–1	0–4	3–1	—	0–1	3–1	3–1
Teignmouth	3–1	4–0	3–1	0–2	0–1	1–1	7–3	1–1	3–0	2–0	2–0	2–4	2–0	0–3	2–1	2–0	—	2–1	0–2
Torridgeside	3–0	2–2	3–3	0–4	2–3	1–2	2–1	3–1	1–1	0–2	7–3	2–5	2–2	0–3	4–2	3–3	0–2	—	3–2
Torrington	1–0	2–0	0–0	0–2	2–4	0–4	0–2	0–4	3–1	2–0	4–2	1–1	3–2	0–2	6–0	2–3	0–2	4–5	—

Legend: Blue = home team win; Yellow = draw; Red = away team win.

=== Stadia and locations ===
Locations of the 2022–23 South West Peninsula League Premier Division East teams
Locations of the 2022–23 South West Peninsula League Premier Division East teams (Dorset)

Team	Location	Stadium	Capacity
Axminster Town	Axminster	Tiger Way	3,000
Bovey Tracey	Bovey Tracey	Mill Marsh Park	3,000
Bridport	Bridport	St Mary's Field	2,000
Brixham	Brixham	Wall Park	2,000
Crediton United	Crediton	Lords Meadow	3,000
Cullompton Rangers	Cullompton	Speeds Meadow	1,000
Dartmouth	Dartmouth	Long Cross	1,000
Elburton Villa	Plymouth	Haye Road	2,000
Elmore	Tiverton	Horsdon Park	2,000
Holsworthy	Holsworthy	Upcott Field	2,000
Honiton Town	Honiton	Mountbatten Park	800
Ivybridge Town	Ivybridge	Erme Valley	2,000
Newton Abbot Spurs	Newton Abbot	Recreation Ground	3,000
Okehampton Argyle	Okehampton	Simmons Park	2,500
Plymouth Marjon	Plymouth	The Campus	1,000
Sidmouth Town	Sidmouth	Manstone Lane	2,500
Teignmouth	Teignmouth	Coombe Valley	2,000
Torridgeside	Great Torrington	Donnacroft	1,000
Torrington	Great Torrington	Vicarage Field	500

== Premier Division West ==
South West Peninsula League

Premier Division West featured 18 teams, the same as the previous season after Falmouth Town were promoted to the Western League Premier Division, and Porthleven resigned from the league.

St Dennis had initially been relegated from the league, but were reprieved due to a resignation elsewhere in the pyramid.

Two clubs joined the division:

- Bude Town, promoted from the St Piran Football League East Division.
- Mullion, promoted from the St Piran Football League West Division.

=== League table ===
Pos	Team	Pld	W	D	L	GF	GA	GD	Pts	Promotion or relegation
1	St Blazey (C, P)	30	25	1	4	88	24	+64	76	Promoted to the Western League
2	Wendron United	30	23	4	3	99	35	+64	73	
3	Liskeard Athletic	30	22	4	4	99	28	+71	70	
4	Wadebridge Town	30	21	4	5	88	32	+56	67	
5	Bude Town	30	17	4	9	70	48	+22	55	
6	Newquay	30	16	5	9	57	42	+15	53	
7	Dobwalls	30	13	5	12	51	57	−6	44	
8	A.F.C. St Austell	30	12	5	13	41	60	−19	41	
9	Camelford	30	11	2	17	47	59	−12	35	
10	Callington Town	30	9	4	17	58	67	−9	31	
11	Mullion	30	8	5	17	53	76	−23	29	
12	Bodmin Town	30	7	7	16	43	79	−36	28	
13	Penzance	30	7	5	18	40	70	−30	26	
14	Launceston	30	6	6	18	37	77	−40	24	
15	Sticker	30	4	7	19	39	91	−52	19	
16	St Dennis	30	4	2	24	32	97	−65	14	Reprieved from relegation
17	Godolphin Atlantic (Newquay)	0	0	0	0	0	0	0	0 (Note: Godolphin Athlantic (Newquay) announced on 3 January 2023 that the club had folded and resigned from the league. Their record of PL19 W4 D0 L15 GF24 GA63 Pts12 was expunged the following day.)	Resigned from the league
18	Penryn Athletic	0	0	0	0	0	0	0	0 (Note: Penryn Athletic resigned from the league on 21 June 2022 without playing a match. They were placed bottom of the league for relegation purposes.)	Resigned from the league

Source: SWPL.co.uk
Rules for classification: 1) points; 2) goal difference; 3) number of goals scored.
(C) Champions; (P) Promoted

=== Results table ===
Home \ Away	BOD	BUD	CAL	CAM	DOB	GAN	LAU	LIS	MUL	NQY	PNR	PNZ	STA	STB	STD	STI	WAD	WEN
Bodmin Town		3–1	0–4	2–2	1–2		5–1	0–9	1–1	1–2		1–1	0–2	0–6	1–0	1–2	0–3	2–2
Bude Town	2–1		3–2	2–0	2–1		5–0	1–1	3–0	1–1		6–2	1–3	2–6	6–1	5–1	1–1	1–1
Callington Town	0–2	1–3		5–1	1–1		0–0	4–3	3–3	0–1		6–2	1–2	0–3	8–0	3–0	1–4	1–5
Camelford	4–1	1–0	2–0		1–2		2–1	1–2	3–1	1–3		6–1	0–1	2–3	1–0	1–2	0–2	3–4
Dobwalls	3–1	2–1	3–2	0–1			7–1	3–3	0–0	0–3		2–1	4–4	0–1	3–2	3–2	0–1	1–5
Godolphin Atlantic (Newquay)																		
Launceston	3–3	1–4	2–1	1–2	2–1			1–2	2–0	1–2		2–1	1–1	0–5	2–3	2–2	0–4	0–4
Liskeard Athletic	6–0	2–0	2–2	5–0	6–1		5–1		4–1	2–1		5–0	2–0	0–2	5–0	4–0	3–0	2–3
Mullion	1–3	2–4	7–2	4–1	3–4		1–0	0–1		3–4		3–2	3–2	1–5	5–0	0–0	2–3	0–4
Newquay	5–0	5–2	2–5	2–1	0–1		2–1	0–0	2–0			0–1	3–1	0–2	2–1	1–0	3–3	1–3
Penryn Athletic																		
Penzance	2–0	1–3	3–0	1–0	3–1		2–3	0–1	1–3	0–0			1–2	1–3	1–3	2–2	0–5	2–2
St Austell	0–3	1–0	1–0	3–3	2–0		1–0	0–6	1–2	3–1		0–1		0–4	0–3	3–0	0–7	0–4
St Blazey	4–1	1–0	2–0	4–0	0–1		5–2	1–2	4–0	1–1		3–1	2–1		4–0	3–2	1–0	2–4
St Dennis	0–4	4–5	0–3	0–3	0–0		0–3	3–5	4–3	1–4		1–1	2–3	0–3		1–3	0–6	1–5
Sticker	3–3	1–2	0–2	0–5	2–4		2–2	0–6	3–3	0–2		3–5	2–2	0–5	3–1		2–3	1–6
Wadebridge Town	7–2	0–1	2–0	2–0	3–1		2–2	0–3	7–0	4–2		2–0	2–2	1–0	3–1	7–1		3–1
Wendron United	1–1	2–3	8–1	5–0	3–0		3–0	3–2	3–1	3–2		2–1	2–0	2–3	2–0	4–0	3–1	

Source: SWPL.co.uk
Legend: Blue = home team win; Yellow = draw; Red = away team win.

=== Stadia and locations ===
Locations of the 2022–23 South West Peninsula League Premier Division West teams

Team	Location	Stadium	Capacity
AFC St Austell	St Austell	Poltair Park	6,000
Bodmin Town	Bodmin	Priory Park	5,000
Bude Town	Bude	Broadclose Park	2,000
Callington Town	Callington	Marshfield Parc	1,000
Camelford	Camelford	Trefrew Park	1,000
Dobwalls	Dobwalls	Lantoom Park	2,000
Godolphin Atlantic (Newquay)	Newquay	Godolphin Way	1,000
Launceston	Launceston	Pennygillam	1,000
Liskeard Athletic	Liskeard	Lux Park	2,000
Mullion	Mullion	Clifden Park	1,000
Newquay	Newquay	Mount Wise Stadium	5,000
Penryn Athletic	Penryn	Kernick Road	2,000
Penzance	Penzance	Penlee Park	1,100
St Blazey	St Blazey	Blaise Park	3,500
St Dennis	St Dennis	Boscawen Park	2,000
Sticker	Sticker	Burngullow Lane	2,000
Wadebridge Town	Wadebridge	Bodieve Park	1,500
Wendron United	Wendron	Underlane	1,000
