= 2015–16 South West Peninsula League =

Football competition in England

The 2015–16 South West Peninsula League season was the ninth in the history of the South West Peninsula League, a football competition in England, that feeds the Premier Division of the Western Football League. The league had been formed in 2007 from the merger of the Devon County League and the South Western League, and is restricted to clubs based in Cornwall and Devon. The Premier Division of the South West Peninsula League is on the same level of the National League System as the Western League Division One.

The constitution was announced on 15 May 2015. With regard to relegation from Division One East and Division One West, if only one club were eligible for promotion from these two divisions, then no club would be relegated, but if two clubs were eligible, then one club would be relegated and a playoff match would determine the relegated club. In the event, Okehampton Argyle accepted relegation without participating in a playoff.

== Premier Division ==
South West Peninsula League
- Champions: Bodmin Town
- Relegated: Stoke Gabriel; Elburton Villa

The Premier Division featured 20 teams, the same as the previous season, after Bovey Tracey were relegated to Division One East, and Elmore resigned mid-season. Two new clubs joined the league:

- Helston Athletic, promoted from Division One West.
- Tavistock, promoted from Division One East.
- No club applied for promotion to Step 5.

=== League table ===
Pos	Team	Pld	W	D	L	GF	GA	GD	Pts	Relegation
1	Bodmin Town (C)	38	27	8	3	130	43	+87	89	
2	St Austell	38	26	4	8	104	54	+50	82	
3	Tavistock	38	24	5	9	104	42	+62	77	
4	Plymouth Parkway	38	22	9	7	95	43	+52	75	
5	Godolphin Atlantic	38	18	7	13	71	61	+10	61	
6	Saltash United	38	18	5	15	66	59	+7	59	
7	Witheridge	38	17	8	13	68	77	−9	59	
8	Torpoint Athletic	38	16	7	15	60	61	−1	55	
9	Ivybridge Town	38	16	6	16	74	68	+6	54	
10	Helston Athletic	38	14	10	14	64	68	−4	52	
11	Falmouth Town	38	14	8	16	57	64	−7	50	
12	Exmouth Town	38	15	4	19	67	83	−16	49	
13	Cullompton Rangers	38	12	10	16	64	71	−7	46	
14	Launceston	38	9	17	12	51	58	−7	44	
15	Camelford	38	10	11	17	51	80	−29	41	
16	Callington Town	38	9	12	17	55	77	−22	39	
17	St Blazey	38	11	5	22	58	99	−41	38	
18	Newquay	38	11	4	23	52	98	−46	37	
19	Stoke Gabriel (R)	38	9	7	22	58	68	−10	34	Relegation to Division One East
20	Elburton Villa (R)	38	6	5	27	40	115	−75	23	Relegation to Division One West

Updated to match(es) played on 8 May 2016. Source:
Rules for classification: 1) points; 2) goal difference; 3) number of goals scored.
(C) Champions; (R) Relegated

== Division One East ==
Division One East featured 18 clubs, the same as the previous season, after Tavistock were promoted to the Premier Division, Plymstock United were transferred to Division One West and two new clubs joined:

- Bovey Tracey, relegated from the Premier Division.
- Tiverton Town Reserves, promoted from the Devon and Exeter League.
- Only Tiverton Town Reserves applied for promotion to the Premier Division, and the club passed the ground grading requirements.

Pos	Team	Pld	W	D	L	GF	GA	GD	Pts	Promotion or relegation
1	Tiverton Town Reserves (C, P)	34	28	5	1	101	26	+75	89	Promotion to the Premier Division
2	Teignmouth	33	19	9	5	74	34	+40	69 (Note: Teignmouth v Galmpton United (1 May 2016) – Galmpton could not raise a team, so Teignmouth were awarded three points and Galmpton were deducted three points.)	
3	University of Exeter	34	21	6	7	75	46	+29	69	
4	St Martins	34	19	9	6	74	42	+32	66	
5	Galmpton United	32	16	5	11	66	59	+7	53 (Note: Galmpton United v Appledore (10 April 2016) – Appledore could not raise a team, so Galmpton were awarded three points and Appledore were deducted three points.)	
6	Alphington	34	16	4	14	65	57	+8	52	
7	Newton Abbot Spurs	34	15	5	14	69	62	+7	50	
8	Axminster Town	34	14	7	13	72	61	+11	49	
9	Brixham	34	15	3	16	80	66	+14	48	
10	Appledore	32	13	7	12	69	57	+12	46 (Note: Appledore v Okehampton Argyle (10 March 2016) – Okehampton could not raise a team and forfeited the match. Appledore were awarded three points and Okehampton were deducted three points.)	
11	Budleigh Salterton	34	12	9	13	60	55	+5	45	
12	Sidmouth Town	34	14	3	17	69	73	−4	45	
13	Exwick Villa	34	13	5	16	51	77	−26	44	
14	Crediton United	34	11	5	18	56	74	−18	38	
15	Liverton United	34	9	7	18	55	79	−24	34	
16	Bovey Tracey	34	9	4	21	60	88	−28	31	
17	Totnes & Dartington	34	9	3	22	52	105	−53	30	
18	Okehampton Argyle (R)	33	0	4	29	42	129	−87	1	Relegation to Level 12

Updated to match(es) played on 7 May 2016. Source:
(C) Champions; (P) Promoted; (R) Relegated

== Division One West ==
Division One West featured 17 clubs, increased from 16 the previous season, after Helston Athletic were promoted to the Premier Division, Perranporth resigned from the league and three new clubs joined:

- Plymouth Argyle Reserves, applying from outside the pyramid system.
- Plymstock United, transferred from Division One East.
- Wendron United, promoted from the Cornwall Combination.
- Liskeard Athletic, Plymouth Argyle Reserves, St Dennis and Sticker applied for promotion to the Premier Division. St Dennis failed the ground grading requirements, and the other clubs passed.

Pos	Team	Pld	W	D	L	GF	GA	GD	Pts	Promotion
1	Mousehole (C)	32	30	1	1	131	17	+114	91	
2	Plymouth Argyle Reserves (P)	32	26	3	3	98	25	+73	81	Promotion to the Premier Division
3	Sticker	32	24	2	6	92	38	+54	74	
4	Penryn Athletic	32	19	4	9	97	36	+61	61	
5	Plymstock United	32	17	6	9	59	48	+11	57	
6	St Dennis	32	18	1	13	92	84	+8	55	
7	Liskeard Athletic	32	16	5	11	91	63	+28	53	
8	Bude Town	32	16	5	11	84	60	+24	53	
9	Wendron United	32	11	8	13	56	75	−19	41	
10	Penzance	32	12	5	15	58	82	−24	41	
11	Holsworthy	32	12	3	17	56	64	−8	39	
12	Illogan RBL	32	8	5	19	56	98	−42	29	
13	Millbrook	32	6	5	21	49	99	−50	23	
14	Wadebridge Town	32	4	10	18	40	94	−54	22	
15	Dobwalls	32	6	2	24	35	83	−48	20	
16	Porthleven	32	5	5	22	35	92	−57	20	
17	Vospers Oak Villa	32	4	6	22	47	118	−71	18	

Updated to match(es) played on 14 May 2016. Source:
(C) Champions; (P) Promoted

== Promotion from feeder leagues for 2016–17 ==
Clubs must achieve the necessary ground grading, and finish in the top three of their league. Only one club per league will be accepted. If two or more clubs satisfy all requirements and are considered of equal merit, the league board will decide on which club(s) to accept.

The following clubs have applied for promotion to Division One East and West for next season:

- Cornwall Combination – Ludgvan (failed), Mullion (passed but rejected)
- Devon & Exeter Football League – Elmore (passed but rejected), Feniton (passed but rejected), Newtown (passed but rejected), Topsham Town (failed)
- North Devon Football League – Ilfracombe Town (passed but rejected), Torridgeside (passed and accepted)
- Plymouth and West Devon Combination Football League – Plymouth Marjon (passed and accepted), Plymouth Sol (withdrawn)
- South Devon Football League – Buckland Athletic Reserves (passed but rejected), Dartmouth (failed), Watcombe Wanderers (withdrawn)
