= 2016–17 South West Peninsula League =

Football competition in England

The 2016–17 South West Peninsula League season was the tenth in the history of the South West Peninsula League, a football competition in England, that feeds the Premier Division of the Western Football League. The league had been formed in 2007 from the merger of the Devon County League and the South Western League, and is restricted to clubs based in Cornwall and Devon. The Premier Division of the South West Peninsula League is on the same level of the National League System as the Western League Division One.

The constitution was announced on 21 May 2016.

== Premier Division ==
South West Peninsula League

The Premier Division featured 20 teams, the same as the previous season, after Stoke Gabriel were relegated to Division One East, and Elburton Villa were relegated to Division One West.

Two new clubs joined the league:

- Plymouth Argyle Reserves, promoted from Division One West.
- Tiverton Town Reserves, promoted from Division One East.

Reserve sides are not eligible for promotion to Step 5.

- Only Exmouth Town and Plymouth Parkway applied for promotion to Step 5.

With the news that Tiverton Town Reserves were resigning from the league for financial reasons at the end of the season, only one club would be relegated from the Premier Division. Also, as only three clubs satisfied the requirements for promotion from the feeder leagues, only two clubs were relegated from Division One level.

=== League table ===
Pos	Team	Pld	W	D	L	GF	GA	GD	Pts	Relegation
1	Tavistock (C)	38	30	5	3	138	39	+99	95	
2	Saltash United	38	28	6	4	113	26	+87	90	
3	Bodmin Town	38	27	8	3	117	40	+77	89	
4	St Austell	38	26	4	8	124	60	+64	82	
5	Exmouth Town	38	25	4	9	97	43	+54	79	
6	Plymouth Argyle Reserves	38	22	8	8	112	40	+72	74	
7	Plymouth Parkway	38	19	11	8	94	48	+46	70 (Note: Helston Athletic failed to raise a team for their rearranged match at Cullompton Rangers on 15 April and were deducted three points, with Cullompton awarded three points. Helston also failed to raise a team for the trip to Plymouth Parkway on 22 April, and were deducted another three points, with Plymouth being awarded three points. The table shows both fixtures as 0–0 draws.)	
8	Tiverton Town Reserves	38	17	12	9	97	54	+43	63	Resigned at the end of the season
9	Cullompton Rangers	38	18	5	15	75	71	+4	61	
10	Falmouth Town	38	16	5	17	84	74	+10	53	
11	Launceston	38	14	8	16	56	73	−17	50	
12	Torpoint Athletic	38	13	8	17	60	64	−4	47	
13	Godolphin Atlantic	38	13	3	22	54	92	−38	42	
14	Camelford	38	12	6	20	63	103	−40	42	
15	Callington Town	38	10	4	24	44	98	−54	34	
16	Helston Athletic	38	11	6	21	54	82	−28	31	
17	Ivybridge Town	38	8	5	25	59	122	−63	29	
18	Witheridge	38	6	3	29	38	121	−83	21	
19	Newquay	38	4	5	29	36	162	−126	17 (Note: Newquay were reprieved from relegation.)	
20	St Blazey (R)	38	1	4	33	42	145	−103	7	Relegated to Division One West

Updated to match(es) played on 21:02, 29 April 2017 (UTC). Source: SWPL.co.uk
Rules for classification: 1) points; 2) goal difference; 3) number of goals scored.
(C) Champions; (R) Relegated

== Division One East ==
Division One East featured 18 clubs, the same as the previous season, after Tiverton Town Reserves were promoted to the Premier Division, Okehampton Argyle were relegated, and two new clubs joined:

- Stoke Gabriel, relegated from the Premier Division.
- Torridgeside, promoted from the North Devon League.
- Crediton United, Newton Abbot Spurs and Stoke Gabriel applied for promotion to the Premier Division. Newton Abbot Spurs failed the ground grading.

Pos	Team	Pld	W	D	L	GF	GA	GD	Pts	Promotion or relegation
1	Stoke Gabriel (C, P)	34	22	6	6	107	41	+66	72	Promoted to the Premier Division
2	Teignmouth	34	22	5	7	80	50	+30	71	
3	Appledore	34	21	5	8	91	54	+37	68	
4	Newton Abbot Spurs	34	19	9	6	80	43	+37	66	
5	Brixham	34	20	4	10	77	51	+26	64	
6	Axminster Town	34	17	9	8	62	45	+17	60	
7	Torridgeside	34	18	3	13	93	66	+27	57	
8	Crediton United	34	17	6	11	86	64	+22	57	
9	University of Exeter	35	17	5	13	80	53	+27	56	
10	St Martins	34	13	4	17	54	59	−5	43	
11	Sidmouth Town	34	12	7	15	57	70	−13	43	
12	Alphington	34	12	5	17	54	60	−6	41	
13	Bovey Tracey	34	11	2	21	69	87	−18	35	
14	Galmpton United	34	9	6	19	56	77	−21	33	
15	Liverton United	34	10	3	21	42	102	−60	33	
16	Totnes & Dartington	34	7	5	22	41	90	−49	26	
17	Budleigh Salterton	34	7	4	23	42	112	−70	25	
18	Exwick Villa (R)	34	5	7	22	37	84	−47	22	Relegated to Level 12

Updated to match(es) played on 29 April 2017. Source:
(C) Champions; (P) Promoted; (R) Relegated

== Division One West ==
Division One West featured 18 clubs, increased from 17 the previous season, after Plymouth Argyle Reserves were promoted to the Premier Division, and two new clubs joined:

- Elburton Villa, relegated from the Premier Division.
- Plymouth Marjon, promoted from the Plymouth and West Devon League.
- Elburton Villa, Porthleven, St Dennis and Sticker applied for promotion to the Premier Division. Elburton Villa and Porthleven failed the ground grading.

Pos	Team	Pld	W	D	L	GF	GA	GD	Pts	Promotion or relegation
1	Sticker (C, P)	34	29	4	1	126	26	+100	91	Promoted to the Premier Division
2	Elburton Villa	34	22	7	5	101	45	+56	73	
3	Plymstock United	34	17	6	11	73	58	+15	59 (Note: Bude Town failed to fulfil their fixture away at Plymstock United on 17 December 2016. The table shows a 0–0 draw, but Plymstock were awarded three points instead of one, and Bude were deducted three points.)	
4	Millbrook	34	16	7	11	67	52	+15	55	
5	Penryn Athletic	34	14	10	10	77	53	+24	52	
6	Mousehole	34	15	7	12	74	65	+9	52	
7	St Dennis	34	14	7	13	77	72	+5	49	
8	Liskeard Athletic	34	13	8	13	65	67	−2	47	
9	Illogan RBL	34	13	6	15	72	69	+3	45	
10	Plymouth Marjon	34	13	6	15	50	68	−18	45	
11	Dobwalls	34	13	6	15	70	92	−22	45	
12	Porthleven	34	11	8	15	56	63	−7	43 (Note: Vospers Oak Villa failed to fulfil their fixture away at Porthleven on 2 May 2017. The table shows a 0–0 draw, but Porthleven were awarded three points instead of one, and Oak Villa were deducted three points.)	
13	Wendron United	34	13	4	17	65	91	−26	43	
14	Wadebridge Town	34	12	6	16	72	85	−13	42	
15	Holsworthy	34	11	5	18	66	76	−10	38	
16	Bude Town	34	9	10	15	63	88	−25	33	
17	Penzance	34	7	8	19	57	105	−48	29	
18	Vospers Oak Villa (R)	34	5	3	26	42	98	−56	14	Relegated to Level 12

Updated to match(es) played on 6 May 2017. Source:
(C) Champions; (P) Promoted; (R) Relegated

== Promotion from feeder leagues for 2017–18 ==
Several clubs have applied for promotion to the SWPL for the 2017–18 season. Their success will depend on finishing in the top three in their respective leagues and other factors including ground facilities. Only one club per league can be accepted. If two or more clubs satisfy all requirements and are considered of equal merit, the league board will decide on which club(s) to accept.

The following clubs have applied for promotion to Division One East and West for next season, and have either passed or failed the ground grading process:

- Cornwall Combination – Ludgvan (passed / promoted)
- Devon & Exeter Football League – Heavitree United (failed), Honiton Town (passed / promoted), Newtown (passed)
- East Cornwall League – Bere Alston United (failed)
- North Devon Football League – Braunton (passed), Ilfracombe Town (passed / promoted)
- South Devon Football League – Buckland Athletic Reserves (passed but depended on the first team being promoted to Step 4, which they failed to do), Waldon Athletic (failed)
