= 2014–15 South West Peninsula League =

Football competition in England

The 2014–15 South West Peninsula League season was the eighth in the history of the South West Peninsula League, a football competition in England, that feeds the Premier Division of the Western Football League. The league had been formed in 2007 from the merger of the Devon County League and the South Western League, and is restricted to clubs based in Cornwall and Devon. The Premier Division of the South West Peninsula League is on the same level of the National League System as the Western League Division One.

== Premier Division ==
South West Peninsula League

The Premier Division featured 20 teams, the same as the previous season, after Tavistock were relegated to Division One East, and Liskeard Athletic were relegated to Division One West. Two new clubs joined the league:

- Callington Town, promoted as champions of Division One West.
- Stoke Gabriel, promoted as champions of Division One East.

Only AFC St Austell and Exmouth Town applied to join the Western League Premier Division, with a top three finish also required for promotion. However, Exmouth failed to finish in the top three and St Austell failed the ground grading inspection.

=== League table ===
Pos	Team	Pld	W	D	L	GF	GA	GD	Pts	Relegation
1	St Austell (C)	36	29	4	3	103	31	+72	93 (Note: Bovey Tracey could not raise a team for the trip to St Austell on 22 August, and had three points deducted. St Austell were awarded all three points, although the table shows a 0–0 draw.)	
2	Bodmin Town	36	25	6	5	98	42	+56	81	
3	Saltash United	36	26	2	8	81	59	+22	80	
4	Ivybridge Town	36	23	5	8	91	39	+52	74	
5	Plymouth Parkway	36	23	4	9	128	48	+80	73	
6	Witheridge	36	18	7	11	88	59	+29	61	
7	Godolphin Atlantic	36	18	6	12	72	54	+18	60	
8	Exmouth Town	36	14	13	9	63	50	+13	55	
9	St Blazey	36	14	7	15	58	70	−12	49	
10	Launceston	36	13	9	14	56	67	−11	48	
11	Callington Town	36	13	7	16	48	54	−6	46	
12	Cullompton Rangers	36	14	4	18	58	70	−12	46	
13	Torpoint Athletic	36	13	7	16	51	67	−16	46	
14	Stoke Gabriel	36	12	4	20	53	74	−21	40	
15	Newquay	36	8	6	22	50	79	−29	30	
16	Falmouth Town	36	7	9	20	45	80	−35	30	
17	Camelford	36	7	5	24	51	90	−39	26	
18	Elburton Villa	36	5	8	23	39	109	−70	23	
19	Bovey Tracey (R)	36	1	5	30	33	124	−91	4	Relegation to Division One East/West
20	Elmore	0	0	0	0	0	0	0	0 (Note: Elmore withdrew from the league on 23 September 2014 with immediate effect, and their record of PL7 W0 D1 L6 GF7 GA30 Pts1 was expunged. They fielded a team in the Devon & Exeter League as a replacement.)	Club withdrew, record expunged

Updated to match(es) played on 17:35, 4 May 2015 (UTC). Source:
Rules for classification: 1) points; 2) goal difference; 3) number of goals scored.
(C) Champions; (R) Relegated

== Division One East ==
Division One East featured 18 clubs, increased from 16 the previous season, after Stoke Gabriel were promoted to the Premier Division, and three new clubs joined:

- Brixham, promoted as runners-up in the South Devon League.
- St Martins, promoted as champions of the Devon and Exeter League.
- Tavistock, relegated from the Premier Division.

Two clubs, Tavistock and Teignmouth, applied for promotion to the Premier Division. Tavistock passed the ground grading, but Teignmouth failed. A top-five finish is also required.

Pos	Team	Pld	W	D	L	GF	GA	GD	Pts	Promotion
1	Tavistock (C, P)	34	24	5	5	80	31	+49	77	Promotion to the Premier Division
2	Appledore	34	24	5	5	70	32	+38	77	
3	Teignmouth	34	21	6	7	102	48	+54	69	
4	University of Exeter	34	20	8	6	102	45	+57	68	
5	St Martins	34	21	4	9	79	41	+38	67	
6	Galmpton United	34	18	8	8	83	53	+30	58 (Note: Galmpton United could not raise a team for the trip to Okehampton Argyle on 17 April, and had three points deducted. Okehampton were awarded all three points, although the table shows a 0–0 draw.)	
7	Alphington	34	15	6	13	66	70	−4	51	
8	Okehampton Argyle	34	14	6	14	71	79	−8	50	
9	Brixham	34	11	8	15	63	62	+1	41	
10	Sidmouth Town	34	12	5	17	71	94	−23	41	
11	Crediton United	34	12	2	20	58	79	−21	38	
12	Totnes & Dartington	34	10	5	19	74	89	−15	35	
13	Budleigh Salterton	34	9	8	17	56	84	−28	35	
14	Plymstock United	34	11	2	21	59	94	−35	35	Transferred to Division One West
15	Liverton United	34	10	4	20	61	96	−35	34	
16	Exwick Villa	34	10	3	21	50	76	−26	33	
17	Newton Abbot Spurs	34	8	6	20	59	87	−28	30	
18	Axminster Town	34	8	5	21	62	105	−43	29	

Updated to match(es) played on 4 May 2015. Source:
(C) Champions; (P) Promoted

== Division One West ==
Division One West originally featured 18 clubs, increased from 16 the previous season, after Callington Town were promoted to the Premier Division, and three new clubs joined:

- Illogan RBL, promoted as champions of the Cornwall Combination.
- Liskeard Athletic, relegated from the Premier Division.
- Millbrook, promoted as third-placed club in the East Cornwall League.

On 7 July 2014, Truro City Reserves resigned from the league with immediate effect, and Foxhole Stars resigned on 22 July, leaving 16 clubs in the division.

Four clubs – Helston Athletic, Liskeard Athletic, St Dennis and Sticker – applied for promotion to the Premier Division. Helston and Liskeard passed the ground grading, but St Dennis and Sticker failed. A top-five finish is also required.

Pos	Team	Pld	W	D	L	GF	GA	GD	Pts	Promotion
1	Helston Athletic (C, P)	30	22	2	6	104	39	+65	68	Promotion to the Premier Division
2	Vospers Oak Villa	30	20	5	5	73	43	+30	65	
3	Penryn Athletic	29	18	6	5	71	33	+38	63	
4	St Dennis	30	20	3	7	67	37	+30	63	
5	Sticker	30	18	4	8	73	50	+23	58	
6	Liskeard Athletic	30	15	6	9	58	53	+5	51	
7	Mousehole	30	14	5	11	70	42	+28	47	
8	Bude Town	30	15	2	13	68	55	+13	47	
9	Illogan RBL	30	13	5	12	59	53	+6	44	
10	Wadebridge Town	30	13	2	15	69	65	+4	41	
11	Porthleven	30	10	5	15	67	73	−6	35	
12	Dobwalls	30	10	4	16	56	71	−15	34	
13	Holsworthy	30	7	7	16	55	71	−16	28	
14	Penzance	31	6	4	21	47	82	−35	22	
15	Millbrook	30	3	5	22	40	133	−93	14	
16	Perranporth	30	1	3	26	30	107	−77	6	Resigned at the end of the season

Updated to match(es) played on 4 May 2015. Source:
(C) Champions; (P) Promoted
