= 2018–19 South West Peninsula League =

Football competition in England

The 2018–19 South West Peninsula League season was the twelfth in the history of the South West Peninsula League, a football competition in England, that feeds the Premier Division of the Western Football League. The league was formed in 2007 from the merger of the Devon County League and the South Western League, and is restricted to clubs based in Cornwall and Devon. The Premier Division of the South West Peninsula League is on the same level as the National League System as the Western League Division One (Step 6).

The constitution was announced on 25 May 2018. At the end of this season, significant restructuring of the league was to take place. With this in mind, it was decided not to transfer clubs between Division One East and Division One West just for one season, solely in order to balance the numbers in each division for this season.

For 2019–20, the league will consist of two Step 6 divisions of twenty clubs each. These two divisions will be made up of the 2018–19 Step 6 (Premier Division) clubs, plus others promoted from Step 7 and below. There will be two new Step 7 leagues below the South West Peninsula League in 2019–20, the Devon League and the St Piran League.

== Premier Division ==
South West Peninsula League

The Premier Division featured 20 teams, the same as the previous season, after Plymouth Parkway were promoted to the Western League Premier Division, and Stoke Gabriel were demoted to Division One East.

Two new clubs joined the league:

- Elburton Villa, promoted from Division One West.
- Millbrook, promoted from Division One West.

Reserve sides are not eligible for promotion to Step 5.

- Witheridge withdrew from the league on 7 August, before any matches had been played. They joined the Devon League at the start of the 2019–20 season.
- At the end of the season, any clubs not promoted to Step 5 or taking voluntary relegation to Step 7 were placed in one of the two Step 6 divisions for 2019–20, except Plymouth Argyle Reserves, who did not apply to stay at Step 6. A Plymouth Argyle Development side joined the Devon League at the start of the 2019–20 season.

=== League table ===
Pos	Team	Pld	W	D	L	GF	GA	GD	Pts	Promotion
1	Tavistock (P)	36	29	4	3	120	41	+79	91	Promoted to Western League Premier Division
2	Exmouth Town (P)	36	28	5	3	91	28	+63	89	Promoted to Western League Premier Division
3	Plymouth Argyle Reserves	36	25	3	8	123	45	+78	78	Left the league at the end of the season
4	Saltash United	36	24	4	8	87	42	+45	76	Transfer to SWPL Premier West
5	St Austell	36	24	4	8	102	62	+40	76	Transfer to SWPL Premier West
6	Falmouth Town	36	18	5	13	80	54	+26	59	Transfer to SWPL Premier West
7	Torpoint Athletic	36	17	6	13	78	62	+16	57	Transfer to SWPL Premier East
8	Cullompton Rangers	36	17	6	13	56	46	+10	57	Transfer to SWPL Premier East
9	Bodmin Town	36	17	6	13	71	62	+9	57	Transfer to SWPL Premier West
10	Millbrook	36	17	5	14	66	67	−1	56	Transfer to SWPL Premier East
11	Helston Athletic	36	14	8	14	58	52	+6	50	Transfer to SWPL Premier West
12	Ivybridge Town	36	12	7	17	55	72	−17	43	Transfer to SWPL Premier East
13	Newquay	36	12	6	18	57	77	−20	42	Transfer to SWPL Premier West
14	Godolphin Atlantic	36	10	6	20	46	86	−40	36	Transfer to SWPL Premier West
15	Elburton Villa	36	8	9	19	53	81	−28	33	Transfer to SWPL Premier East
16	Launceston	36	7	4	25	52	111	−59	25	Transfer to SWPL Premier West
17	Callington Town	36	6	6	24	35	86	−51	24	Transfer to SWPL Premier West
18	Camelford	36	5	3	28	54	101	−47	18	Transfer to SWPL Premier West
19	Sticker	36	1	5	30	26	135	−109	8	Transfer to SWPL Premier West
20	Witheridge	0	0	0	0	0	0	0	0	Withdrew from the league at the start of the season

Updated to match(es) played on 13:06, 28 April 2019 (UTC). Source: SWPL.co.uk
Rules for classification: 1) points; 2) goal difference; 3) number of goals scored.
(P) Promoted

== Division One East ==
Division One East featured 19 clubs, increased from 18 the previous season, after Totnes & Dartington and Galmpton & Roselands resigned from the league, and three new clubs joined:

- Elmore, promoted from the Devon and Exeter League.
- Stoke Gabriel, demoted from the Premier Division due to ground grading failure.
- Waldon Athletic, promoted from the South Devon League.
- All clubs applied for promotion to Step 6 next season except: Alphington, Budleigh Salterton, Liverton United, St Martins, Teignmouth, University of Exeter and Waldon Athletic. The remainder were promoted to Step 6.
- Torridgeside must secure full planning for ground grading G by 31 March 2020, or face demotion at the end of 2019–20.
- Brixham, Honiton, Stoke Gabriel and Torridgeside must install floodlights by 31 March 2021, or face demotion at the end of 2020–21.

=== League table ===
Pos	Team	Pld	W	D	L	GF	GA	GD	Pts	Promotion
1	Stoke Gabriel (C, P)	34	27	5	2	104	29	+75	86	Promotion to SWPL Premier East
2	Bovey Tracey (P)	34	24	6	4	120	50	+70	78	Promotion to SWPL Premier East
3	Brixham (P)	34	25	2	7	88	41	+47	77	Promotion to SWPL Premier East
4	Torridgeside (P)	34	20	9	5	97	43	+54	71 (Note: Liverton United failed to raise a team for their match at Torridgeside on 21 December and were deducted three points, with Torridgeside awarded three points. The table shows a 0–0 draw.)	Promotion to SWPL Premier East
5	Elmore (P)	34	21	6	7	105	46	+59	69	Promotion to SWPL Premier East
6	Axminster Town (P)	34	19	5	10	83	58	+25	62	Promotion to SWPL Premier East
7	St Martins	34	16	7	11	76	48	+28	55	Transfer to Devon League
8	Ilfracombe Town (P)	34	16	7	11	79	68	+11	55	Promotion to SWPL Premier East
9	Sidmouth Town (P)	34	14	6	14	76	68	+8	48	Promotion to SWPL Premier East
10	Crediton United (P)	34	14	4	16	62	68	−6	46	Promotion to SWPL Premier East
11	Teignmouth	34	13	6	15	84	70	+14	45	Transfer to Devon League
12	Newton Abbot Spurs (P)	34	12	6	16	71	78	−7	42	Promotion to SWPL Premier East
13	University of Exeter	34	12	3	19	97	97	0	39	Transfer to Devon League
14	Honiton Town (P)	34	8	7	19	62	80	−18	31	Promotion to SWPL Premier East
15	Alphington	34	8	5	21	56	93	−37	29	Transfer to Devon League
16	Waldon Athletic	34	8	5	21	59	103	−44	29	Transfer to Devon League
17	Budleigh Salterton	34	1	2	31	34	149	−115	5	Transfer to Devon League
18	Liverton United	34	2	1	31	31	195	−164	3	Transfer to Devon League
19	Appledore	0	0	0	0	0	0	0	0 (Note: Appledore resigned from the league in December 2018 and their playing record of P14 W2 D3 L9 GF16 GA42 Pts9 was expunged.)	Resigned from the league

Updated to match(es) played on 22:59, 6 May 2019 (UTC). Source:
Rules for classification: 1) points; 2) goal difference; 3) number of goals scored.
(C) Champions; (P) Promoted

== Division One West ==
Division One West featured 15 clubs, reduced from 18 the previous season, after Millbrook and Elburton Villa were promoted to the Premier Division, Illogan RBL were relegated, and Penryn Athletic left the league. One new club joined:

- Bere Alston United, promoted from the East Cornwall League.
- All clubs applied for promotion to Step 6 next season except: Bere Alston United, Bude Town, Ludgvan and Plymstock United. The remainder were promoted to Step 6.
- Dobwalls, Mousehole, St Dennis and Wendron United must install floodlights by 31 March 2021, or face demotion at the end of 2020–21.

=== League table ===
Pos	Team	Pld	W	D	L	GF	GA	GD	Pts	Promotion
1	Liskeard Athletic (C, P)	28	23	4	1	94	24	+70	73	Promotion to SWPL Premier West
2	Mousehole (P)	28	20	5	3	106	21	+85	67 (Note: Ludgvan failed to raise a team for their match at Holsworthy on 25 August and were deducted three points, with Holsworthy awarded three points. The table shows a 0–0 draw. Ludgvan also failed to raise a team for their match at Mousehole on 16 March and were deducted three further points, with Mousehole awarded three points. The table again shows a 0–0 draw.)	Promotion to SWPL Premier West
3	Porthleven (P)	28	17	3	8	83	45	+38	54	Promotion to SWPL Premier West
4	Wadebridge Town (P)	28	15	6	7	68	57	+11	51	Promotion to SWPL Premier West
5	St Dennis (P)	28	14	6	8	78	59	+19	48	Promotion to SWPL Premier West
6	Wendron United (P)	28	13	4	11	66	45	+21	43	Promotion to SWPL Premier West
7	Plymstock United	28	13	4	11	76	58	+18	43	Transfer to Devon League
8	Holsworthy (P)	28	12	5	11	46	43	+3	43	Promotion to SWPL Premier East
9	Plymouth Marjon (P)	28	10	6	12	62	53	+9	36	Promotion to SWPL Premier East
10	Dobwalls (P)	28	9	7	12	40	45	−5	34	Promotion to SWPL Premier West
11	St Blazey (P)	28	10	4	14	52	62	−10	34	Promotion to SWPL Premier West
12	Penzance (P)	28	10	3	15	52	61	−9	33	Promotion to SWPL Premier West
13	Bude Town	28	7	1	20	54	77	−23	22	Transfer to St Piran League
14	Bere Alston United	28	6	2	20	47	89	−42	20	Transfer to Devon League
15	Ludgvan	28	0	2	26	11	196	−185	−6	Transfer to St Piran League

Updated to match(es) played on 23:00, 6 May 2019 (UTC). Source:
Rules for classification: 1) points; 2) goal difference; 3) number of goals scored.
(C) Champions; (P) Promoted

== Other applicants for Step 6 ==
Two other clubs from outside the league applied for Step 6 status for 2019–20. They are Dartmouth of the South Devon League, and Torrington of the North Devon League. Both were accepted for promotion to the Premier East.
