= 2025–26 South West Peninsula League =

Football competition in England

The 2025–26 South West Peninsula League season was the 19th in the history of the South West Peninsula League, a football competition in England, that feeds the Premier Division of the Western Football League. The league was formed in 2007 from the merger of the Devon County League and the South Western League and mainly features clubs based in Cornwall and Devon. The two divisions of the South West Peninsula League are on the same level of the National League System as the Western League Division One (Step 6).

The constitution was announced on 15 May 2025.

== Premier Division East ==
South West Peninsula League
- Champions: Bovey Tracey
- Promoted: Bovey Tracey
- Matches: 240
- Goals: 965 (4.02 per match)

Premier Division East featured 16 teams, the same as the previous season, after Sidmouth Town were promoted to the Western League Premier Division, and Elburton Villa were transferred to Premier Division West.

Two clubs joined the division:

- Ilfracombe Town, relegated from the Western League Premier Division.
- Ilminster Town, promoted from the Somerset County League.

=== League table ===
Pos	Team	Pld	W	D	L	GF	GA	GD	Pts	Promotion or relegation
1	Bovey Tracey (C, P)	30	27	1	2	139	31	+108	82	Promoted to the Western League Premier Division
2	Bridport	30	23	4	3	109	45	+64	73	
3	Cullompton Rangers	30	21	2	7	85	35	+50	65	
4	Torridgeside	30	16	5	9	61	34	+27	53	
5	Newton Abbot Spurs	30	16	4	10	64	50	+14	52	
6	Stoke Gabriel & Torbay Police	30	15	5	10	68	54	+14	50	
7	Ilminster Town	30	14	6	10	60	54	+6	48	
8	Middlezoy Rovers	30	14	4	12	61	48	+13	46	
9	Ilfracombe Town	30	13	7	10	59	48	+11	46	
10	Honiton Town	30	13	2	15	53	79	−26	41	
11	Torrington	30	10	4	16	45	78	−33	34	
12	Crediton United	30	8	5	17	46	67	−21	29	
13	Bishops Lydeard	30	8	3	19	30	62	−32	27	
14	Teignmouth	30	7	4	19	37	55	−18	25	Reprieved from relegation
15	Okehampton Argyle	30	5	3	22	34	91	−57	18	Reprieved from relegation
16	Axminster Town	30	0	1	29	14	134	−120	1	Reprieved from relegation

Source: SWPL.co.uk
Rules for classification: 1) points; 2) goal difference; 3) number of goals scored.
(C) Champions; (P) Promoted

=== Results table ===
Home \ Away	AXM	BLY	BOV	BRP	CRE	CUL	HON	ILF	ILM	MID	NAS	OKE	STK	TEI	TRS	TRT
Axminster Town	—	0–0	0–7	1–5	0–6	1–3	1–2	0–4	0–2	1–3	2–3	1–4	1–2	1–5	0–6	0–4
Bishops Lydeard	3–0	—	0–1	0–5	1–0	0–1	0–2	0–2	0–3	1–3	0–1	4–0	2–2	0–1	1–0	4–3
Bovey Tracey	8–1	4–1	—	6–7	2–1	2–0	6–0	2–1	4–1	3–0	3–1	4–0	4–1	5–2	1–1	8–0
Bridport	5–0	4–0	2–5	—	1–1	2–0	6–0	5–2	5–1	4–2	4–3	7–0	1–1	0–4	1–1	3–0
Crediton United	6–0	4–3	1–7	1–4	—	0–5	1–0	4–4	0–2	1–2	0–1	0–2	3–5	0–0	0–1	0–1
Cullompton Rangers	6–0	2–2	3–2	1–2	3–0	—	5–1	1–0	2–2	2–0	5–0	9–0	1–0	2–1	0–1	6–0
Honiton Town	5–0	4–1	1–10	1–5	2–2	2–3	—	4–0	0–2	1–0	3–2	3–1	1–2	2–1	0–2	2–1
Ilfracombe Town	2–1	4–0	0–2	1–4	2–2	0–4	7–1	—	2–0	2–4	1–1	7–1	1–1	1–0	1–0	0–0
Ilminster Town	2–0	5–0	0–5	3–3	2–5	3–5	2–1	2–2	—	3–0	2–2	5–0	3–2	1–1	1–1	2–1
Middlezoy Rovers	6–0	1–0	1–4	2–3	4–0	3–2	7–1	0–0	2–0	—	2–4	0–0	1–5	0–0	1–2	2–3
Newton Abbot Spurs	7–0	0–1	0–2	3–2	2–1	1–3	2–3	3–1	2–0	1–2	—	2–0	2–1	3–1	0–3	6–2
Okehampton Argyle	5–1	5–1	1–8	2–3	2–3	0–1	0–2	0–4	1–3	1–7	1–4	—	0–2	0–1	1–1	2–2
Stoke Gabriel & Torbay Police	8–0	0–2	1–9	2–4	4–0	6–1	2–1	3–2	3–2	1–1	0–2	1–0	—	1–2	1–3	4–0
Teignmouth	4–1	1–2	2–4	0–7	0–2	1–2	0–2	2–3	0–1	0–2	1–1	0–3	2–3	—	3–0	0–2
Torridgeside	9–0	1–0	0–3	2–3	4–0	3–1	4–2	0–1	1–3	2–3	3–3	2–1	2–3	1–0	—	3–0
Torrington	2–1	3–1	2–8	0–2	1–2	0–6	4–4	1–2	4–2	1–0	1–2	3–1	1–1	3–2	0–2	—

Source: SWPL.co.uk
Legend: Blue = home team win; Yellow = draw; Red = away team win.

=== Stadia and locations ===
Locations of the 2025–26 South West Peninsula League Premier Division East teams
Locations of the 2025–26 South West Peninsula League Premier Division East teams (Dorset)

Team	Location	Stadium	Capacity
Axminster Town	Axminster	Tiger Way	3,000
Bishops Lydeard	Bishops Lydeard	Darby Way	1,000
Bovey Tracey	Bovey Tracey	Mill Marsh Park	3,000
Bridport	Bridport	St Mary's Field	2,000
Crediton United	Crediton	Lords Meadow	3,000
Cullompton Rangers	Cullompton	Speeds Meadow	1,000
Honiton Town	Honiton	Mountbatten Park	800
Ilfracombe Town	Ilfracombe	Marlborough Park	2,000
Ilminster Town	Ilminster	Archie Gooch Pavilion	
Middlezoy Rovers	Westonzoyland	Ethan Berry Pavilion	1,000
Newton Abbot Spurs	Newton Abbot	Recreation Ground	3,000
Okehampton Argyle	Okehampton	Simmons Park	2,500
Stoke Gabriel & Torbay Police	Stoke Gabriel	G.J. Churchward Memorial Ground	1,000
Teignmouth	Teignmouth	Coombe Valley	2,000
Torridgeside	Great Torrington	Donnacroft	1,000
Torrington	Great Torrington	Vicarage Field	500

== Premier Division West ==
South West Peninsula League
- Champions: Liskeard Athletic
- Promoted: Liskeard Athletic
- Matches: 210
- Goals: 718 (3.42 per match)

Premier Division West featured 16 teams, the same as the previous season, after Newquay were promoted to the Western League Premier Division, and Bodmin Town took voluntary demotion.

Two clubs joined the division:

- Elburton Villa, transferred from Premier Division East.
- Falmouth Town Reserves, promoted from the St Piran Football League Premier Division West.
- Reserve and development teams are not eligible for promotion to step 5.

=== League table ===
Pos	Team	Pld	W	D	L	GF	GA	GD	Pts	Promotion or relegation
1	Liskeard Athletic (C, P)	28	24	3	1	72	16	+56	75	Promoted to the Western League Premier Division
2	Elburton Villa	28	21	3	4	104	30	+74	66	Transferred to Premier Division East
3	Callington Town	28	15	6	7	61	32	+29	51	
4	Penzance	28	15	5	8	58	32	+26	50	
5	Camelford	28	15	3	10	59	36	+23	48	
6	Falmouth Town Reserves	28	13	5	10	64	44	+20	44	
7	Holsworthy	28	12	6	10	42	33	+9	42	
8	Bude Town	28	12	6	10	33	32	+1	42	
9	Sticker	28	12	4	12	35	34	+1	40	
10	Millbrook	28	9	5	14	31	72	−41	32	
11	Wendron United	28	8	4	16	34	62	−28	28	
12	Wadebridge Town	28	7	6	15	38	68	−30	27	
13	St Day	28	7	3	18	29	75	−46	24	Voluntary demotion to the St Piran League Premier Division West
14	Launceston	28	4	3	21	33	73	−40	15	Reprieved from relegation
15	Dobwalls	28	4	2	22	25	79	−54	14	Reprieved from relegation
16	Truro City Reserves	0	0	0	0	0	0	0	0 (Note: On 24 February 2026 it was announced that Truro City Reserves had resigned from the league after Helston Athletic decided they could no longer continue with their partnership arrangement. Their record of PL17 W3 D0 L14 GF17 GA69 Pts9 was later expunged.)	Resigned from the league

Source: SWPL.co.uk
Rules for classification: 1) points; 2) goal difference; 3) number of goals scored.
(C) Champions; (P) Promoted

=== Results table ===
Home \ Away	BUD	CAL	CAM	DOB	ELB	FAL	HOL	LAU	LIS	MIL	PNZ	DAY	STI	TRU	WAD	WEN
Bude Town		0–0	2–1	3–1	1–3	0–1	1–0	2–2	0–3	0–2	1–0	3–0	0–0		2–2	2–1
Callington Town	3–0		1–0	5–0	2–4	3–2	1–1	3–1	1–1	5–0	3–1	3–0	2–0		1–2	2–0
Camelford	4–0	0–4		3–0	1–2	2–5	4–1	3–1	1–2	1–2	0–1	4–0	1–0		3–1	6–0
Dobwalls	1–4	0–5	1–3		1–3	0–8	0–2	1–2	2–3	1–2	0–3	2–2	1–2		1–3	2–1
Elburton Villa	1–1	5–0	1–4	5–0		6–0	0–0	6–2	0–1	9–0	3–0	3–1	3–0		1–1	5–1
Falmouth Town Reserves	1–0	1–1	2–3	3–1	1–5		1–1	5–0	0–1	2–0	0–2	5–1	1–2		4–0	0–0
Holsworthy	2–1	3–1	2–0	2–1	1–2	3–2		1–1	0–3	1–1	1–3	1–1	0–1		3–0	1–3
Launceston	0–2	1–3	2–3	1–2	2–3	1–3	0–4		0–5	3–3	1–5	1–2	1–3		2–3	4–0
Liskeard Athletic	1–0	2–1	1–0	3–0	1–0	5–0	1–0	3–1		8–0	1–1	6–2	1–0		6–1	2–1
Millbrook	0–2	0–1	1–1	1–1	1–5	0–7	0–4	1–0	1–3		2–0	3–0	2–1		0–2	3–1
Penzance	1–0	1–1	1–1	4–1	3–2	3–3	1–0	2–0	1–2	5–1		8–0	0–1		4–1	0–1
St Day	1–2	1–5	1–4	1–2	1–6	0–1	3–0	2–0	0–4	2–0	2–1		0–1		2–1	0–4
Sticker	0–1	2–2	0–1	3–0	2–4	3–1	0–1	0–1	2–1	2–2	0–1	3–1			1–1	2–4
Truro City Reserves																
Wadebridge Town	1–1	3–2	0–3	1–3	2–8	1–5	1–2	3–2	0–0	1–2	1–3	2–2	0–1			1–3
Wendron United	0–2	1–0	2–2	1–0	0–9	0–0	0–5	0–1	1–2	4–1	3–3	0–1	1–3		1–3	

Source: SWPL.co.uk
Legend: Blue = home team win; Yellow = draw; Red = away team win.

=== Stadia and locations ===
Locations of the 2025–26 South West Peninsula League Premier Division West teams

Team	Location	Stadium	Capacity
Bude Town	Bude	Broadclose Park	2,000
Callington Town	Callington	Marshfield Parc	1,000
Camelford	Camelford	Trefrew Park	1,000
Dobwalls	Dobwalls	Lantoom Park	2,000
Elburton Villa	Plymouth	Haye Road	2,000
Falmouth Town Reserves	Falmouth	Bickland Park	3,572
Holsworthy	Holsworthy	Upcott Field	2,000
Launceston	Launceston	Pennygillam	1,000
Liskeard Athletic	Liskeard	Lux Park	2,000
Millbrook	Millbrook	Jenkins Park	1,000
Penzance	Penzance	Penlee Park	1,100
St Day	St Day	Vogue Park	
Sticker	Sticker	Burngullow Lane	2,000
Truro City Reserves	Helston	Kellaway Park (groundshare with Helston Athletic)	1,300
Wadebridge Town	Wadebridge	Bodieve Park	1,500
Wendron United	Wendron	Underlane	1,000
