= St Day A.F.C. =

Association football club in England

St Day
- Full name: St Day A.F.C.
- Founded: 1949; 77 years ago
- Ground: Vogue Park, St Day
- Chairman: Danny Watts
- Manager: Joff Mallaber
- League: South West Peninsula League Premier Division West
- 2025–26: South West Peninsula League Premier Division West, 13th of 15

St Day Association Football Club is a football club based in St Day, Cornwall. They are currently members of the South West Peninsula League Premier Division West and play at Vogue Park, St Day.

== History ==
St Day A.F.C. was formed in 1949, although there had previously been at least one other club in the village. They joined the Cornwall Combination in 2006, after a long period in the Falmouth and Helston League, and were runners-up in 2012–13. After a third-place finish in 2018–19, they were promoted to the new St Piran League West Division, and finished third two years running in 2021–22 and 2022–23. St Day won the Premier Division (West) title in 2023–24, remaining unbeaten all season, and were subsequently promoted to the South West Peninsula League Premier Division West. After 2 seasons in the SWPL, the club voluntarily resigned from the league and went back into the St Piran Football League for the 2026-27 season.

== Honours ==
- St Piran League Premier Division (West)
  - Champions 2023–24
