= Middlezoy Rovers F.C. =

Association football club in England

- Full name: Middlezoy Rovers F.C.
- Nickname: The Zoy
- Founded: 1973
- Stadium: Ethan Berry Pavilion
- Capacity: 1,000
- Chairman: Craig Berry
- Manager: Mo Hopkins
- League: South West Peninsula League Premier Division East
- 2025–26: South West Peninsula League Premier Division East, 8th of 16
- Website: https://middlezoyrovers.co.uk/

Middlezoy Rovers Football Club is a football club based in Westonzoyland, Somerset, England. They are currently members of the South West Peninsula League Premier Division East and play at The Aerodrome.

== History ==
Middlezoy Rovers F.C. was established in 1973 on part of the former RAF Weston Zoyland airfield, one of the UK's oldest, dating from the 1920s. The club moved into senior football in 2012, joining the Somerset County League Division Two West, finishing as runners up in their first season and earning promotion. The club was promoted to the Premier Division in 2016 after winning Division One West.

Having finished in the top five in the Premier Division several times, Middlezoy applied for promotion to step 6 of the National League System, which they achieved in 2023 with a third-placed finish. They were placed in Division One of the Western League ahead of the 2023–24 season.

Aside from the Men's first team, Middlezoy Rovers also has a Ladies' team, reserves and veterans, and a dozen youth teams.

== Records ==
- Best FA Vase performance: First Round 2026-27
