= Newquay A.F.C. =

Association football club in England

Coordinates: 50°24′36″N 5°05′04″W

Newquay AFC
- Full name: Newquay Association Football Club
- Nicknames: The Peppermints, Towns Club
- Founded: 1890
- Ground: Mount Wise Stadium, Newquay
- Chairman: Jack Hunter
- Manager: Shaun Middleton
- League: Western League Premier Division
- 2025–26: Western League Premier Division, 6th of 18
Home colours	Away colours

Newquay Association Football Club is a football club based in Newquay, Cornwall, England. Nicknamed "The Peppermints", they are currently members of the Western League Premier Division and play at Mount Wise Stadium.

== History ==
The club was established in 1890 as Newquay Football Club, but did not play any competitive games until entering the Cornwall Senior Cup in 1896–97. They were renamed Newquay One and All in 1903 and went on to win the Cornwall Charity Shield in 1906–07. After folding in 1912, the club was re-established as Newquay Rovers in 1920. The new club joined the Plymouth & District League, but left in 1927 due to the cost of travelling. In 1931 they were founder members of the Cornwall Senior League, going on to win the league and the Cornwall Senior Cup in 1934–35. However, the club disbanded in 1937.

The current incarnation of the club was formed in 1946, rejoining the Cornwall Senior League. In 1951 they were founder members of the South Western League. They won the Cornwall Senior Cup in 1952–53, 1954–55 and 1956–57, before finishing as runners-up in the South Western League in 1957–58. They were league champions the following season and retained the title in 1959–60. The club won the league again in 1977–78, 1979–80, 1981–82 and 1983–84, before finishing as runners-up in 1984–85. They were South Western League champions for a seventh time in 1987–88 and finished as runners-up in 1991–92, as well as winning the Cornwall Senior Cup. They finished second in the league again in 1993–94.

In 2007 the South Western League merged with the Devon County League to form the South West Peninsula League, with Newquay placed in Division One West. They were runners-up in the division in 2008–09 and then champions in 2011–12, earning promotion to the Premier Division. Following league reorganisation at the end of the 2018–19 season, the club were placed in the Premier Division West. In 2024–25 they were Premier Division West champions, earning promotion to the Premier Division of the Western League.

=== Season-by-season record ===
Season	Division	Position	Notes
1951–52	South Western League	5/12	
1952–53	South Western League	9/14	
1953–54	South Western League	8/17	
1954–55	South Western League	7/15	
1955–56	South Western League	4/15	
1956–57	South Western League	5/15	
1957–58	South Western League	2/14	Runners-up
1958–59	South Western League	1/16	Champions
1959–60	South Western League	1/16	Champions
1960–61	South Western League	6/15	
1961–62	South Western League	4/14	
1962–63	South Western League	12/16	
1963–64	South Western League	3/16	
1964–65	South Western League	12/16	
1965–66	South Western League	13/15	
1966–67	South Western League	6/17	
1967–68	South Western League	13/15	
1968–69	South Western League	6/17	
1969–70	South Western League	6/18	
1970–71	South Western League	4/18	
1971–72	South Western League	6/18	
1972–73	South Western League	11/17	
1973–74	South Western League	5/16	
1974–75	South Western League	8/19	
1975–76	South Western League	11/19	
1976–77	South Western League	5/18	
1977–78	South Western League	1/17	Champions
1978–79	South Western League	3/19	
1979–80	South Western League	1/19	Champions
1980–81	South Western League	3/20	
1981–82	South Western League	1/19	Champions
1982–83	South Western League	13/20	
1983–84	South Western League	1/20	Champions
1984–85	South Western League	3/19	
1985–86	South Western League	2/20	Runners-up
1986–87	South Western League	8/19	
1987–88	South Western League	1/20	Champions
1988–89	South Western League	4/18	
1989–90	South Western League	4/17	
1990–91	South Western League	4/17	
1991–92	South Western League	2/18	Runners-up
1992–93	South Western League	3/17	
1993–94	South Western League	2/18	Runners-up
1994–95	South Western League	14/18	
1995–96	South Western League	7/18	
1996–97	South Western League	10/16	
1997–98	South Western League	13/16	
1998–99	South Western League	14/17	
1999–00	South Western League	10/18	
2000–01	South Western League	13/19	
2001–02	South Western League	10/19	
2002–03	South Western League	11/19	
2003–04	South Western League	17/18	
2004–05	South Western League	11/17	
2005–06	South Western League	14/18	
2006–07	South Western League	12/19	
2007–08	South West Peninsula League Division One West	6/16	
2008–09	South West Peninsula League Division One West	2/17	Runners-up
2009–10	South West Peninsula League Division One West	5/16	
2010–11	South West Peninsula League Division One West	9/16	
2011–12	South West Peninsula League Division One West	1/17	Champions, promoted
2012–13	South West Peninsula League Premier Division	12/19	
2013–14	South West Peninsula League Premier Division	11/20	
2014–15	South West Peninsula League Premier Division	15/19	
2015–16	South West Peninsula League Premier Division	18/20	
2016–17	South West Peninsula League Premier Division	19/20	
2017–18	South West Peninsula League Premier Division	14/20	
2018–19	South West Peninsula League Premier Division	13/20	
2019–20	South West Peninsula League Premier Division West		

== Ground ==
The club have played at Mount Wise on Clevedon Road since 1922, when Newquay Urban District Council leased the site to the club. Floodlights were erected in the 1980s and inaugurated with a friendly match against West Bromwich Albion. The club's record attendance of 3,500 was set for a friendly match against Manchester City on 14 July 1998, with the visitors winning 6–0.

== Honours ==
- South West Peninsula League
  - Premier Division West champions 2024–25
  - Division One West champions 2011–12
- South Western League
  - Champions 1958–59, 1959–60, 1977–78, 1979–80, 1981–82, 1983–84, 1987–88
  - League Cup winners 1955–56, 1988–89
- Cornwall Senior League
  - Champions 1934–35
- Cornwall Senior Cup
  - Winners 1934–35, 1952–53, 1954–55, 1956–57, 1991–92
- Cornwall Charity Cup
  - Winners 1906–07, 1908–09, 1953–54, 1954–55, 1955–56, 1957–58, 1958–59, 1962–63, 1969–70, 1974–75, 1976–77, 1977–78, 1988–89, 2009–10

== Records ==
- Best FA Cup performance: Second qualifying round, 1950–51, 1956–57, 1973–74, 1976–77, 1977–78, 1979–80
- Best FA Vase performance: Fourth round, 1990–91
- Record attendance: 3,500 vs Manchester City, friendly match, 14 July 1998

== See also ==
- Newquay A.F.C. players
- Newquay A.F.C. managers
