= Elburton Villa F.C. =

Association football club in England

Coordinates: 50°21′45.99″N 4°04′00.93″W

Elburton Villa
- Full name: Elburton Villa Football Club
- Nickname: The Villa
- Founded: 1982
- Ground: Haye Road, Plymouth
- Capacity: 2,000
- Chairman: Kevin Treeby
- Manager: Kevin Yetton
- League: South West Peninsula League Premier Division East
- 2025–26: South West Peninsula League Premier Division West, 2nd of 15
Home colours	Away colours

Elburton Villa Football Club is a football club based in Elburton Village, Plymouth, England. They are currently members of the South West Peninsula League Premier Division East and play at Haye Road.

== History ==
The club was established in 1982 as a successor to Elburton Red Triangle FC. They joined the Plymouth & District League and went on to win the Division One title in 1990–91. In 1992 the club were founder members of the Devon County League. The 1994–95 season saw the club win the league's Throgmorton Cup, beating Weston Mill Oak Villa in the final.

In 2007 the Devon County League merged with the South Western League to form the South West Peninsula League, with Elburton becoming members of the Premier Division. The club were relegated to Division One West after finishing bottom of the Premier Division in 2015–16. They were Division One West runners-up the following season. In 2017–18 the club finished third in Division One West and were promoted to the Premier Division in place of Stoke Gabriel, who had requested to be relegated. Following league reorganisation at the end of the 2018–19 season, they were placed in the Premier Division East.

== Ground ==
The club play at Haye Road, opposite the King George V Playing Fields which had been home to Elburton Red Triangle. The ground was officially opened on 18 July 1992 with a pre-season friendly game against Watford. Floodlights and a 50-seat stand were installed during the 2012–13 season. The ground hosts a canteen hut, limited bar, changing rooms and toilet facilities.

== Honours ==
- Plymouth & District League
  - Division One champions 1990–91
- Devon County League
  - Throgmorton Cup winners 1994–95

== Records ==
- Best FA Vase performance: Third round, 2026–27
