= Mousehole A.F.C. =

Association football club in England

Coordinates: 50°05′23.9″N 5°33′13.1″W

Mousehole
- Full name: Mousehole Association Football Club
- Nickname: The Seagulls
- Founded: 1922; 104 years ago
- Ground: Trungle Parc, Paul, Cornwall
- Capacity: 2,000
- Chairman: Deryk Heywood
- Manager: Ashley Waters
- League: South West Peninsula League Premier Division West
- 2025–26: Southern League Division One South, 17th of 22 (voluntarily relegated)
- Website: mouseholeafc.co.uk

Mousehole Association Football Club is a football club based in Paul, Cornwall. They are currently members of the South West Peninsula League Premier Division West and play at Trungle Parc. It is named after the nearby village of Mousehole.

== History ==
Mousehole joined the Cornwall Combination in 1960–61 and were promoted to the South West Peninsula League Division One West on its formation in 2007, after finishing as Combination runners-up the previous season. They won Division One West in 2015–16. At the end of 2018–19, the league was restructured, and Mousehole successfully applied for promotion to the Premier Division West, at Step 6 of the National League System.

In 2017, the club had a sponsorship arrangement with the Endorsed Group, a recruitment and software company run by a local businessman. Together with the club they set up the Endorsed Academy, aiming to improve coaching standards and provide opportunities for young footballers in Cornwall. Mousehole hosted a pre-season tournament in July 2018, the Endorsed Cup, featuring youth teams from Newcastle United, Huddersfield Town and Bolton Wanderers.

In 2018, an approach was made by Mousehole concerning a possible merger between themselves and neighbours Penzance A.F.C., amid concerns that Trungle Parc may not prove viable as Mousehole progress through the leagues. A further approach was made by Penzance in 2019, but in May, Mousehole released a statement confirming they had withdrawn from the discussions. In 2021, they were promoted to the Premier Division of the Western League based on their results in the abandoned 2019–20 and 2020–21 seasons. They were promoted to the Southern Football League as champions in the 2022–23 season, only the second Cornish side to reach step four of the non-league system.

== Records ==
- Best FA Cup performance: 2nd qualifying round, 2023–24
- Best FA Trophy performance: 3rd qualifying round, 2023–24, 2024–25
- Best FA Vase performance: 2nd round, 2021–22, 2022–23

== Honours ==
- Cornwall Combination
  - Runners-up 1985–86, 2006–07
- South West Peninsula League
  - Division One West Champions 2015–16
- Western Football League
  - Premier Division Champions 2022–23
