= Helston Athletic F.C. =

Association football club in England

Coordinates: 50°06′07.59″N 5°15′55.08″W

Helston Athletic
- Full name: Helston Athletic Football Club
- Nickname: The Blues
- Founded: 1896
- Ground: Kellaway Park, Helston
- Chairman: Paul Hendy
- Manager: Dan Bua
- League: South West Peninsula League Premier Division West
- 2025–26: Western League Premier Division, 11th of 18 (voluntarily relegated)
Home colours

Helston Athletic Football Club is a football club based in Helston, Cornwall, England. They are currently members of the South West Peninsula League Premier Division West and play at Kellaway Park.

== History ==
The club was established in 1896. They joined the Cornwall Senior League after its formation in 1931 and won back-to-back league titles in 1936–37 and 1937–38. After finishing as runners-up in 1938–39, the club were champions for a third time in 1939–40. In 1953 they joined the South Western League. The club finished bottom of the South Western League in 1970–71, and after finishing second-from-bottom the following season, left to join the Cornwall Combination.

Helston were Cornwall Combination champions in 1987–88 and again in 2000–01. After winning the league for a third time in 2010–11 the club were promoted to Division One West of the South West Peninsula League. They finished as runners-up in both of their first two seasons in the league, and after a third-place finish in 2013–14, won the division in 2014–15, earning promotion to the Premier Division. Following league reorganisation at the end of the 2018–19 season, the club were placed in the Premier Division West.

In 2021 Helston were promoted to the Premier Division of the Western League based on their results in the abandoned 2019–20 and 2020–21 seasons. The 2022–23 season saw them win the league's Les Phillips Cup, beating Shepton Mallet 2–0 in the final, and the Cornwall Senior Cup, in which they defeated Millbrook on penalties in the final. The following season the club were Premier Division champions, earning promotion to Division One South of the Southern League.

The 2024–25 season saw Helston finish third-from-bottom of Division One South, resulting in relegation back to the Premier Division of the Western League. Although they finished in mid-table in the Western League Premier Division the following season, the club requested to be demoted and were placed in the Premier Division West of the South West Peninsula League.

== Ground ==
The club played at several grounds on Clodgey Lane before moving to Beacon Park in 1949, a ground which had been built by German POWs shortly after World War II. In 1972 they moved to their current ground, Kellaway Park, also on the same road. The ground initially consisted of a rented pitch, before a wooden shed was built that also served as the clubhouse. A new clubhouse was built in 1988 and included a roof overhang for spectator cover.

In 2015 a 100-seat stand and floodlights were installed, with the first match under lights played on 1 September 2015 against St Austell.

== Honours ==
- Western League
  - Premier Division champions 2023–24
  - Les Phillips Cup winners 2022–23
- South West Peninsula League
  - Division One West champions 2014–15
- Cornwall Combination
  - Champions 1987–88, 2000–01, 2010–11
- Cornwall Senior League
  - Champions winners 1936–37, 1937–38, 1939–40
- Cornwall Senior Cup
  - Winners 1936–37, 2022–23
- Cornwall Charity Cup
  - Winners 1937–38, 1960–61, 1962–62
- Cornwall Junior Cup
  - Winners 2013–14

== Records ==
- Best FA Cup performance: Third qualifying round, 2022–23
- Best FA Vase performance: Second round, 2020-21, 2025–26

== See also ==
- Helston Athletic F.C. players
- Helston Athletic F.C. managers
