= Torridgeside A.F.C. =

Association football club in England

Coordinates: 50°57′11.8″N 4°07′30.3″W

Torridgeside
- Full name: Torridgeside Association Football Club
- Nickname: T-Side
- Founded: 1989
- Ground: Donnacroft, Great Torrington
- Chairman: Emma Hill
- Manager: Jamie Bright and Karl Newman
- League: South West Peninsula League Premier Division East
- 2025–26: South West Peninsula League Premier Division East, 4th of 16

Torridgeside Association Football Club is a football club based in Great Torrington, Devon, England. They are currently members of the South West Peninsula League Premier Division East and play at Donnacroft.

== History ==
Formed in 1989, Torridgeside joined the North Devon League Division Two in 2003–04, winning it the following season. They were promoted to the Senior Division the year after that, and promoted again to the Premier Division in 2008–09. They won the Premier Division title in 2012–13, and were runners-up in 2015–16, earning promotion to the South West Peninsula League Division One East. At the end of 2018–19 the league was restructured, and, having finished fourth, Torridgeside successfully applied for promotion to the Premier Division East, at Step 6 of the National League System. The club features two adult teams and eight youth teams.

On 2 May 2019, Torridgeside were beaten 5–4 by Bovey Tracey after extra time in the final of the Devon Premier Cup.

== Honours ==
- North Devon League
  - Premier Division champions 2012–13
- Devon Premier Cup
  - Runners-up 2018–19

== Records ==
- Best FA Vase performance: First Round 2026-27
