= Honiton Town F.C. =

Association football club in England

Coordinates: 50°47′55.4″N 3°12′06.7″W

Honiton Town
- Full name: Honiton Town Football Club
- Nickname: The Hippos
- Founded: 1950
- Ground: Mountbatten Park, Honiton
- Chairman: Roger Doble
- Manager: Leroy Venn
- League: South West Peninsula League Premier Division East
- 2025–26: South West Peninsula League Premier Division East, 10th of 16

Honiton Town Football Club is a football club based in Honiton, Devon, England. They are currently members of the South West Peninsula League Premier Division East and play at Mountbatten Park.

== History ==
Honiton Town were members of the Devon & Exeter League during the 1980s and 1990s, until withdrawing in 1997–98.

On rejoining the league, they stayed in the lower divisions until they won Division One in 2014–15. They won the Premier Division in 2016–17 and were promoted to the South West Peninsula League Division One East.

At the end of 2018–19 the league was restructured, and Honiton successfully applied for promotion to the Premier Division East, at Step 6 of the National League System.

In the 2022/23 season, Honiton had their highest league finish of 13th position in the South West Premier Easy Peninsula League, a season which also included significant ground upgrades with the additions of floodlights and a seated grandstand.

In 23/24, they entered the FA Vase for the first time, drawing Falmouth Town away.

== Honours ==
- Devon & Exeter League
  - Premier Division champions 2016–17

== Records ==
- Best FA Vase performance: Second Round 2026-27
