= Liskeard Athletic F.C. =

Football club in Cornwall, England

Coordinates: 50°27′42″N 4°27′49″W

Liskeard Athletic
- Full name: Liskeard Athletic Football Club
- Nickname: The Blues
- Founded: 1946
- Ground: Lux Park, Liskeard
- Capacity: 2,000 (50 seated)
- Chairman: Jon Colenzo
- Mangers: Darren Gilbert & Wayne Gamble
- League: Western League Premier Division
- 2025–26: South West Peninsula League Premier Division West, 1st of 15 (promoted)
Home colours

Liskeard Athletic Football Club is a football club based in Liskeard, Cornwall, England. They are currently members of the Western League Premier Division and play at Lux Park.

== History ==
The original Liskeard Athletic were regular finalists in the Cornwall Senior Cup; after finishing on the losing side in 1893–94, 1895–96, 1901–02 and 1903–04, they won the trophy in 1904–05 with a 1–0 win over Penzance. The club folded in 1935 due to financial problems.

The modern club was established in 1946. In 1966 they joined the South Western League. The club were runners-up in 1975–76 and went on to win the league the following season. After finishing as runners-up again in 1977–78, they won the league for a second time the following season and moved up to Division One of the Western League. A third-place finish in their first season in the division resulted in promotion to the Premier Division. They went on to win the Cornwall Senior Cup in 1983–84 and 1984–85.

In 1985–86 Liskeard were Premier Division runners-up and won the Senior Cup for a third consecutive season. They were Western League champions in 1987–88 and won the Senior Cup again in 1988–89. The club finished as runners-up in the Premier Division again in 1989–90, also retaining the Senior Cup. However, in 1995 they dropped back into the South Western League. The club won the Senior Cup in 2002–03 and were runners-up in the South Western League in 2006–07. At the end of the season the league merged with the Devon County League to form the South West Peninsula League, with Liskeard placed in the Premier Division.

The 2013–14 season saw Liskeard finish bottom of the Premier Division, resulting in relegation to Division One West. Following league reorganisation at the end of the 2018–19 season, the club were elevated to the Premier Division West. In 2025–26 they won the Premier Division West title, earning promotion to the Premier Division of the Western League.

== Ground ==
The club have played at Lux Park since their establishment in 1946. The ground had been used for football and cricket since the early 20th century and was sold by Viscount Clifton for £300 in 1912 for use as a sports ground. An adjacent field was purchased for £500 in 1922 and used for football, with the first match on 9 September that year against Woodland Villa. Although the football club folded in 1935, the ground continued to be usd for rugby and then by Moorswater Football Club for the 1945–46 season.

After Liskeard Athletic started playing at Lux Park, dressing rooms were built in 1961 and a standing area erected in the late 1980s. A seated stand was built in 1989 to replace an older structure. The standing area was replaced by a new stand after being destroyed by high winds in January 1990.

== Honours ==
- Western League
  - Premier Division champions 1987–88
- South West Peninsula League
  - Premier Division West champions 2025–26
- South Western League
  - Champions 1976–77, 1978–79
- Cornwall Senior Cup
  - Winners 1904–05, 1983–84, 1984–85, 1985–86, 1988–89, 1989–90, 1993–94, 2002–03

== Records ==
- Best FA Cup performance: Third qualifying round, 1981–82, 1982–83, 1990–91, 1991–92
- Best FA Vase performance: Fourth round, 1994–95

== See also ==
- Liskeard Athletic F.C. players
- Liskeard Athletic F.C. managers
