= Crediton United A.F.C. =

Association football club in England

Coordinates: 50°47′31.73″N 3°38′30.76″W

Crediton United
- Full name: Crediton United Athletic Football Club
- Nicknames: Kirton, Creddy
- Founded: 1910
- Ground: Lords Meadow, Crediton
- Manager: Fred Tonkin and Chris Clarke
- League: South West Peninsula League Premier Division East
- 2025–26: South West Peninsula League Premier Division East, 12th of 16
Home colours

Crediton United Association Football Club is a football club based in Crediton, Devon, England. They are currently members of the South West Peninsula League Premier Division East and play at Lords Meadow.

== History ==
The club was established in 1910, holding their first general meeting on 10 September, and immediately joined the Exeter & District League. After World War I the club was reformed as Crediton Association Football Club, before reverting to its previous name in August 1919. They won the East Devon Senior Cup in 1933–34, beating Topsham St Margarets 2–1 in the final. In 1962–63 the club were champions of Division One, earning promotion to the Premier Division. Although they were relegated to Division One at the end of the 1965–66 season, having finished second-from-bottom of the Premier Division, the club were Division One champions the following season and were promoted back to the Premier Division.

Crediton were relegated from the Premier Division after finishing bottom of the table in 1968–69. The league was renamed the Devon & Exeter League in 1972 and the club returned to the Premier Division after finishing as runners-up in Division One in 1984–85. They were Premier Division champions in 1987–88 and runners-up the following season. After finishing fourth in the division in 1989–90, the club moved up to Division One of the Western League. A third-place finish in 1992–93 saw them promoted to the Premier Division, where they remained until the end of the 1995–96 season when they finished bottom of the table and were relegated to Division One.

In 1998 Crediton resigned from the Western League due to travelling costs, dropping into the Devon County League. In 2007 the league merged with the South Western League to form the South West Peninsula League, with Crediton placed in Division One East. Following league reorganisation at the end of the 2018–19 season, the club were elevated to the Premier Division East.

== Ground ==
The club moved to their Lords Meadow ground in 1976.

== Honours ==
- Devon & Exeter League
  - Premier Division champions 1987–88
  - Division One champions 1962–63, 1966–67
- East Devon Senior Cup
  - Winners 1933–34

== Records ==
- Best FA Vase performance: First round, 1991–92, 1992–93, 2017–18

== See also ==
- Crediton United A.F.C. players
- Crediton United A.F.C. managers
