= Bovey Tracey A.F.C. =

Association football club in England

Coordinates: 50.5940°N 3.6802°W

Bovey Tracey
- Full name: Bovey Tracey Association Football Club
- Nickname: Moorlanders
- Founded: 1950
- Ground: Mill Marsh Park, Bovey Tracey
- Chairman: Chris Hunt
- Manager: Ben Gerring
- League: Western League Premier Division
- 2025–26: South West Peninsula League Premier Division East, 1st of 16 (promoted)
Home colours

Bovey Tracey Association Football Club is a football club based in Bovey Tracey, Devon, England. They are currently members of the Western League Premier Division and play at Mill Marsh Park.

== History ==
The club was established in 1950 as a merger of Bovey St Johns and Bovey Town. They became members of the South Devon League and won the league's Herald Cup in 1960–61. After winning the league in 2007–08, the club were promoted to Division One East of the South West Peninsula League. In their first season in the division they were runners-up and were promoted to the Premier Division. The club finished bottom of the Premier Division in 2014–15 and were relegated to Division One East. Following league reorganisation at the end of the 2018–19 season, the club were elevated to the Premier Division East.

In 2025–26 Bovey Tracey were Premier Division East champions, resulting in promotion to the Premier Division of the Western League.

== Ground ==
The club initially played at the Recreation Ground. In 1979 they bought land at Mill Marsh Park to build their current ground.

== Honours ==
- South West Peninsula League
  - Premier Division East champions 2025–26
- South Devon League
  - Champions 2007–08
  - Herald Cup winners 1960–61

== Records ==
- Best FA Cup performance: Extra preliminary round, 2020–21
- Best FA Vase performance: Third round, 2022–23, 2025–26, 2026–27

== See also ==
- Bovey Tracey A.F.C. players
- Bovey Tracey A.F.C. managers
