= Launceston F.C. =

Association football club in England

Coordinates: 50°37′38.45″N 4°22′27.19″W

- Full name: Launceston Football Club
- Nickname: The Clarets
- Founded: 1891
- Ground: Pennygillam, Launceston
- Chairman: Alan Bradley
- Manager: Mike Steele, Paul Hider, Kevin Hatch (Interim)
- League: South West Peninsula League Premier Division West
- 2025–26: South West Peninsula League Premier Division West, 14th of 15
Home colours	Away colours

Launceston Football Club is a football club based in Launceston, Cornwall, England. They are currently members of the South West Peninsula League Premier Division West and play at Pennygillam.

== History ==
The original club was established in 1891. They reached the final of the Cornwall Senior Cup in its first season (1892–93), but lost 5–1 to Penzance. After three more losing appearances in the final, they won the cup for the first time in 1899–1900 and retained it the following season. They joined the Cornish & Devon League, but folded in 1907 after their ground was closed, with a team named "The Boys of England" taking over their fixtures.

The modern club was formed in 1922 by a merger of Launceston Saturdays and the Comrades. They joined the Plymouth & District League and were Division Two champions in 1928–29. The mid-1950s saw a sustained period of success as the club won the league for three successive seasons between 1955–56 and 1957–58. They then moved up to the South Western League where they played for three seasons, before leaving in 1961. Although the club rejoined the league in 1962, they left again after finishing bottom of the table in 1965–66, dropping into the East Cornwall Premier League.

In 1979 Launceston returned to the South Western League for a third spell. They won the Cornwall Senior Cup again in 1982–83 and were runners-up in 1983–84 before winning the league in 1994–95. However, after finishing fourth the following season and winning the League Cup, they finished bottom of the league for the next three seasons. In 2004–05 they won the Cornwall Senior Cup for a fourth time, and in 2006–07 they were the last winners of the League Cup prior to the South Western League merging with the Devon County League to form the South West Peninsula League, with the club placed in the Premier Division. Following league reorganisation at the end of the 2018–19 season, they were placed in the Premier Division West.

== Honours ==
- South Western League
  - Champions 1994–95
  - League Cup winners 1995–96, 2006–07
- Plymouth & District League
  - Champions 1955–56, 1956–57, 1957–58
  - Division Two champions 1928–29
- Cornwall Senior Cup
  - Winners 1899–1900, 1900–01, 1982–83, 2004–05

== Records ==
- Best FA Cup performance: Preliminary round, 2008–09, 2009–10
- Best FA Vase performance: Second round, 2006–07

== See also ==
- Launceston F.C. players
- Launceston F.C. players
