= Dobwalls F.C. =

Association football club in England

Coordinates: 50°27′15.0″N 4°30′35.6″W

Dobwalls
- Full name: Dobwalls Football Club
- Nickname: The Dingos
- Founded: 1922
- Ground: Lantoom Park, Dobwalls
- Capacity: 3000
- Chairman: Peter Mutton
- League: South West Peninsula League Premier Division West
- 2025–26: South West Peninsula League Premier Division West, 15th of 15

Dobwalls Football Club is a football club based in Dobwalls, Cornwall. They are currently members of the South West Peninsula League Premier Division West and play at Lantoom Park.

== History ==
Dobwalls joined the East Cornwall League in 2002–03, finishing in the top five every season before being promoted to the South West Peninsula League Division One West on its formation in 2007. They spent twelve seasons in that division with a top finish of seventh in 2008–09. At the end of 2018–19 the league was restructured, and Dobwalls successfully applied for promotion to the Premier Division West, at Step 6 of the National League System. Dobwalls entered the FA Vase for the first time in 2021–22.

The club opened a new clubhouse in March 2017, and the ceremony was performed by Neil Warnock, with Sheryll Murray MP in attendance.

== Honours 1st Team ==
- League
  - SWPL 3rd place 2024-25
  - Plymouth & District League Div 2 Runners up; 1988–89
  - Plymouth & District League Div 2 3rd place; 1992–93
  - Plymouth & District League Div 1 3rd place; 1993–94
  - Duchy Division One Winners; 1998–99; 2001–02
  - Duchy Premier League Champions: 2001–02
  - East Cornwall Premier League runner-up; 2006–07
- Cups
  - Isaac Foot Cup
    - Runners-up 1938
  - Cornwall Charity Cup
    - Runners-up 2013 &2014
  - Duchy Knock-Out Cup
    - Winners: 2001
  - Duchy Premier Cup
    - Winners: 1999 & 2002
  - Launceston Cup
    - Winners: 1972; 1987; 1997; 2000; 2001
    - Runners-up; 1975, 1982, 1989
  - Duchy Supplementary Cup
    - Winners: 1976/77

== Honours 2nd Team ==
  - ST Piran Div 2 East Champions 2024-25
- Cups
  - Launceston Cup
    - Winners: 2018
    - Runners-up; 2017,2022
