= A.F.C. St Austell =

Association football club in England

Coordinates: 50°20′30.24″N 4°47′08.93″W

AFC St Austell
- Full name: Association Football Club St. Austell
- Nickname: The Lillywhites
- Founded: 1890; 136 years ago
- Ground: Poltair Park; St Austell
- Chairman: Jason Powell
- Manager: Rob Astin and Stu Mitchinson
- League: South West Peninsula League Premier Division West
- 2025–26: Western League Premier Division (expelled)
Home colours	Away colours

Association Football Club St Austell is a football club based in St Austell, Cornwall. They play in the South West Peninsula League Premier Division West.

== History ==
A.F.C St Austell were among the founding members of the South Western League in 1951. In over 50 years they claimed the title once, in 1968–69, and achieved four runner-up spots between 1963 and 1973. They remained in their original competition until 2007 when they joined the newly formed South West Peninsula League Division One West. In 2009–10 season A.F.C. St Austell gained promotion to the South West Peninsula Premier League by finishing runners up. A second success since came in the 2014–15 season when the club were crowned champions; their first league trophy since 1968–69 season.

They have played intermittently in the FA Competitions over the decades. Their best performance in the FA Cup dates back to 1947–48 when they made the third qualifying round, while in the FA Vase their most successful is the 2014–15 season, where the club reached the semi-finals, losing 2–1 on aggregate to Glossop North End. They also won the league and cup double.

In 2012, floodlights were installed on the ground, enabling the club to compete once again in the FA Cup and FA Vase tournaments.

In 2015 the club applied to take the step to the next tier of football but due to a failed ground inspection the application was denied by the FA.

2016 saw the team lift the league Cup.

2018-2019 saw the side come 5th level on points with Saltash and make the League Cup quarter final and the Senior Cup semi final. They also made it to 4th round of the FA Vase losing to eventual winners Chertsey Town.

To the start of the new 2019 -2020 season the club appoint Lee Hodges and Chris Todd as 1st Team Manager and Assistant Manager who left prior to the season starting and were replaced by St Austell favourites Chris Knight and James Powell for their 2nd spell managing the club.

The 2019 -2020 season was cut short from the world pandemic of Coronavirus, the season was declared null and void. They were in 2nd place at the time.

Mark Ferguson-Smith and Steve Wheatley were made the new manager and coach for the 2020 - 2021 season.

== Season history ==
Season	Division	Position	Notes
2000–01	South Western League	16th	
2001–02	South Western League	19th	
2002–03	South Western League	18th	
2003–04	South Western League	6th	
2004–05	South Western League	9th	
2005–06	South Western League	17th	
2006–07	South Western League	18th	
2007–08	South West Peninsula League West Division	16th	
2008–09	South West Peninsula League West Division	3rd	
2009–10	South West Peninsula League West Division	2nd	Promoted to Premier Division
2010–11	South West Peninsula League Premier Division	10th	
2011–12	South West Peninsula League Premier Division	8th	
2012–13	South West Peninsula League Premier Division	4th	
2013–14	South West Peninsula League Premier Division	9th	
2014–15	South West Peninsula League Premier Division	1st	
2015-16	South West Peninsula League Premier Division	2nd	
2016-17	South West Peninsula League Premier Division	4th	
2017-18	South West Peninsula League Premier Division	6th	
2018-19	South West Peninsula League Premier Division	5th	
2019-20	South West Peninsula League Premier Division	2nd	
2020-21	South West Peninsula League Premier Division	10th	
2021-22	South West Peninsula League Premier Division	12th	
2022-23	South West Peninsula League Premier Division	8th	
2023-24	South West Peninsula League Premier Division	1st	Promoted to Western League Premier Division
2024-25	Western League Premier Division	11th	
2025-26	Western League Premier Division	NA	Club was suspended, then later Expelled by the league

== Ground ==
St Austell play their home games at Poltair Park, which was previously known as Tregonissey Road.

== Honours ==
=== League honours ===
- South West Peninsula League Premier Division
  - Champions (1): 2014–15
- South West Peninsula League Division One west
  - Runners Up (1): 2009–10
- South Western League
  - Champions (1): 1968–69
  - Runners-up (4): 1963–64, 1965–66, 1971–72, 1972–73

=== Cup honours ===
- Cornwall Senior Cup
  - Winners (14): 1912, 1913, 1914, 1934, 1939, 1946, 1947, 1949, 1964, 1969, 1972, 2009, 2014, 2015
- Cornwall Charity Cup
  - Winners (3): 1908, 1914, 1932
- League Cup
  - Winners (1): 2016
