= Penzance A.F.C. =

Association football club in England

Coordinates: 50°06′55.14″N 5°32′30.59″W

Penzance
- Full name: Penzance Association Football Club
- Nickname: The Magpies
- Founded: 1888
- Ground: Penlee Park
- Capacity: 1,100 (550 seated)
- Chairman: Godfrey Adams
- Manager: Mark Vercesi
- League: South West Peninsula League Premier Division West
- 2025–26: South West Peninsula League Premier Division West, 4th of 15
Home colours

Penzance Association Football Club is a Charter Standard Football Club based in Penzance, Cornwall in the United Kingdom. They were established in 1888 and were founding members of the South Western League in 1951, and maintained membership of that league until 2007 when they joined the newly formed South West Peninsula League Division One West. In common with many other teams that play in black-and-white stripes, they are nicknamed The Magpies. They currently play in the South West Peninsula League Premier Division West.

== History ==
Penzance AFC was founded in 1888, the same year as the Football League was established. They played their first match that season against employees of the Eastern Telegraph Company, based in Porthcurno. The following year, the club was one of the founding members of the Cornwall County Football Association. In the 1892–93 season, the club won the first award of the Cornwall Senior Cup, beating Launceston 5–0 in the final. They missed out on the final in the next two seasons, but then appeared in the following six finals, winning three of those matches. In the first sixteen years of the competition, Penzance making ten appearances in the final, winning six of them and losing four. In five of those appearances, their opponents were Launceston, including four years running from the 1897–98 season. In the 1947–48 season, the club celebrated a double, winning both the Senior Cup, and the Cornwall Charity Cup.

Penzance were founding members of the South Western League in 1951, and participated in the competition throughout its existence until it was merged with the Devon County League to form the South West Peninsula League. They enjoyed mixed success in the competition, winning the League in consecutive seasons in 1955–56 and 1956–57, and then again in 1974–75, before in later years suffering from a series of finishes in the bottom half of the table. They finished bottom of the league in 1986–87, 1990–91 and 1991–82, but were not relegated from the league on any of these occasions. Upon the creation of the South West Peninsula League, Penzance were placed in Division One West due to their position in the previous season's South Western League, when they had finished in sixteenth out of nineteen teams. After finishing eleventh in their first season in the new league, they won the Division in 2008–09, gaining promotion to the Premier Division. They also won the Cornwall Charity Cup, the first county cup they had won since claiming the Senior Cup in 1981.

In 1988–89, to celebrate their centenary year, Penzance hosted English champions Liverpool and Scottish champions Celtic The match against Liverpool, played in August 1988 attracted a crowd of over 5,000 as Penzance lost 6–0. 2,000 people attended the Celtic match, watching as the Scottish team also claimed a 6–0 victory over the Magpies in March 1989.

Penzance have appeared in both the FA Cup and the FA Vase on multiple occasions, their most recent FA Cup appearance being during the 2006–07. Their most successful campaign came in 1955–56, when they reached the Third Qualifying Round, taking Bideford of the Western League to a replay. They have appeared in the FA Vase in every season since 2004–05, failing to get past the Second Qualifying Round.

In June 2012 before the 2012–13 season, the club faced some bad news when the FA refused to allow them to enter any national FA competitions because they do not have toilet facilities in the home and away dressing room, and the referee's room.

In May 2025, the club faced Cullompton Rangers in the WCP League Cup Final. The match was 0-0 at full time but Penzance went on to win 8-7 on penalties with the winning penalty scored by Chris “Wormy” Wormington. This was the first silverware the club had won since the Division One West/Charity Cup double of 2008-09.

== Ground ==
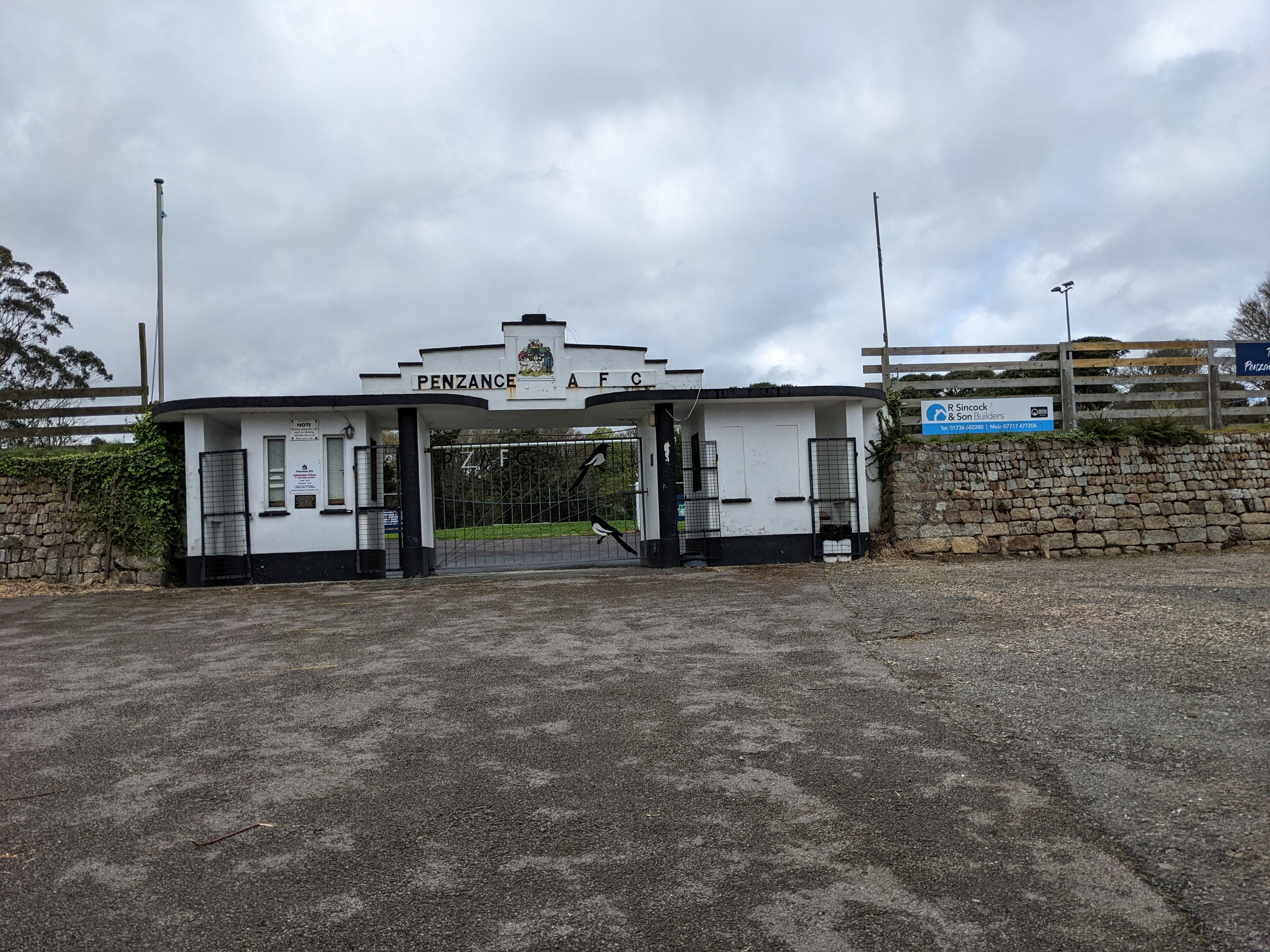
Penlee Park

Penzance play their home matches at Penlee Park, Alexandra Place, Penzance, Cornwall, TR18 4NE. The ground was opened in 1952 by Sir Stanley Rous, a former referee, and at the time, secretary of the Football Association. To mark the official opening of the new ground, Penzance played a match against Luton Town, who were at the time playing in Division Two. The ground has a 550-seat stand, clubhouse, tea hut and parking. In 1954, Penlee Park hosted a match between West Ham United and Swansea Town of the Football League, attracting over 7,000 football supporters.

== Reserves ==
Penzance Reserves have played in the Cornwall Combination League since its foundation in 1959–60. They were runners-up in the competition in 1965–66 and 2001–02. Like the first-team, they have finished bottom of their league a number of times but avoided relegation, doing so in 1961–62, 1985–86 and most recently in 2007–08. They now play in the Trelawney League Division 1 having been promoted at the conclusion of the 2017–18 season.

== Records ==
- Best FA Cup performance: 3rd qualifying round, 1955–56 (replay), 1975–76
- Best FA Vase performance: 1st round proper, 2025-26

== Honours ==
- Walter C Parson Funeral Directors League Cup
  - Champions: 2024–25
- South West Peninsula League Division One West
  - Champions: 2008–09
- South Western League
  - Champions: 1955–56, 1956–57, 1974–75
- Cornwall Senior Cup
  - Winners: 1892–93, 1895–96, 1897–98, 1898–99, 1903–04, 1907–08, 1947–48, 1960–61, 1972–73, 1980–81
  - Runners-up: 1896–97, 1899–1900, 1900–01, 1904–05, 1948–49, 1949–50, 1954–55, 1956–57, 1974–75
- Cornwall Junior Cup
  - Winners:
  - Runners-up: 1907–08, (Note: Playing as Penzance A.F.C. Reserves.) 1909–10
- Cornwall Charity Cup
  - Winners: 1947–48, 1948–49, 2008–09
  - Runners-up: 1921–22 1963–64, 1995–96, 1996–97

== Notable players ==
Players who have played/managed in the football league or any foreign equivalent to this level (i.e. fully professional league).

- (England) Gerry Gazzard
- (England) Tony Kellow
- (England) Wayne Quinn
- (England) Mike Tiddy
- (England) Darren Cann
- (England) Sean Flynn
