= South Western Football League =

- Founded: 1951
- Country: England
- Divisions: 1
- Number of clubs: 19
- Level on pyramid: 11
- Feeder to: Western League

The South Western Football League was an English association football league composed of clubs from Cornwall and west and north Devon. It consisted of a single division at the eleventh overall tier of the English football league system, the seventh and lowest "Step" of the official National League System. The East Cornwall League and Cornwall Combination ranked below the South Western on the overall pyramid, and in turn have feeder leagues of their own.

Champions of the South Western League, whose last principal sponsor was the Carlsberg beer brand via St. Austell Brewery, were eligible for promotion to the lower division of the Western League, but the difficulties Cornish teams have travelling further afield have discouraged applications for promotion. Truro City took this step in 2006. The lowest-ranked clubs in the 2004–05 FA Cup all came from the South Western League, no other clubs from leagues at that pyramid level having been accepted. Among them were St. Blazey, whose record for longest unbeaten streak in league football anywhere in the United Kingdom (75 games) stood until it was broken by AFC Wimbledon in 2004.

The league was formed in 1951 but foundation dates of the member clubs range from the 1880s to 1980s. The league disbanded in 2007, with a merger with the Devon County League to form a new competition covering the whole of Devon and Cornwall called the South West Peninsula League. The new competition's top division is at Step 6 of the National League System, feeding directly into the Premier Division of the Western League.

The League ran a representative team; it played a match against a Football Association Amateur XI on 1954-10-16, losing 7–3 at Home Park, Plymouth.

== Champions ==
Source: 1951-2006, 1951-2007

- 1951-52 - Torquay United Reserves
- 1952-53 - Torquay United Reserves
- 1953-54 - Saltash United
- 1954-55 - St Blazey
- 1955-56 - Penzance
- 1956-57 - Penzance
- 1957-58 - St Blazey
- 1958-59 - Newquay
- 1959-60 - Newquay
- 1960-61 - Truro City
- 1961-62 – Falmouth Town
- 1962-63 - St Blazey
- 1963-64 - St Blazey
- 1964-65 - Torpoint Athletic
- 1965-66 – Falmouth Town
- 1966-67 - Torpoint Athletic
- 1967-68 – Falmouth Town
- 1968-69 - St Austell
- 1969-70 - Truro City
- 1970-71 – Falmouth Town
- 1971-72 – Falmouth Town
- 1972-73 – Falmouth Town
- 1973-74 – Falmouth Town
- 1974-75 - Penzance
- 1975-76 - Saltash United
- 1976-77 - Liskeard Athletic
- 1977-78 - Newquay
- 1978–79 – Liskeard Athletic
- 1979–80 – Newquay
- 1980–81 – St Blazey
- 1981–82 – Newquay
- 1982–83 – St Blazey
- 1983–84 – Newquay
- 1984–85 – Bugle
- 1985–86 – Falmouth Town
- 1986–87 – Falmouth Town
- 1987–88 – Newquay
- 1988–89 – Falmouth Town
- 1989–90 – Falmouth Town
- 1990–91 – Bodmin Town
- 1991–92 – Falmouth Town
- 1992–93 – Truro City
- 1993–94 – Bodmin Town
- 1994–95 – Launceston
- 1995–96 – Truro City
- 1996–97 – Falmouth Town
- 1997–98 – Truro City
- 1998–99 – St Blazey
- 1999–00 – Falmouth Town
- 2000–01 – St Blazey
- 2001–02 – St Blazey
- 2002–03 – St Blazey
- 2003–04 – St Blazey
- 2004–05 – St Blazey
- 2005–06 – Bodmin Town
- 2006–07 – St Blazey
