= 2013–14 South West Peninsula League =

Football competition in England

The 2013–14 South West Peninsula League season was the seventh in the history of the South West Peninsula League, a football competition in England, that feeds the Premier Division of the Western Football League. The league had been formed in 2007 from the merger of the Devon County League and the South Western League, and is restricted to clubs based in Cornwall and Devon. The Premier Division of the South West Peninsula League is on the same level of the National League System as the Western League Division One.

== Premier Division ==
South West Peninsula League
- Champions: Plymouth Parkway
- Promoted: None
- Relegated: Tavistock; Liskeard Athletic
- Matches: 380
- Goals: 1,456 (3.83 per match)

The Premier Division featured 20 teams, the same as the previous season, after Dartmouth resigned, Liverton United took voluntary demotion to Division One East, and Penzance were relegated to Division One West. Three new clubs joined the league:

- Elmore, transferred from the Western League Division One.
- Exmouth Town, promoted as champions of Division One East.
- Godolphin Atlantic, promoted as champions of Division One West.

Exmouth Town were the only club to apply for promotion to Step 5, but they failed ground grading.

=== League table ===
Pos	Team	Pld	W	D	L	GF	GA	GD	Pts	Relegation
1	Plymouth Parkway (C)	38	29	3	6	121	33	+88	90	
2	Exmouth Town	38	26	8	4	85	28	+57	86	
3	Saltash United	38	27	4	7	104	33	+71	85	
4	Ivybridge Town	38	24	5	9	98	60	+38	77	
5	Godolphin Atlantic	38	23	6	9	75	50	+25	75	
6	Witheridge	38	23	4	11	83	49	+34	73	
7	Bodmin Town	38	22	7	9	75	41	+34	73	
8	Launceston	38	22	5	11	92	61	+31	71	
9	St Austell	38	20	8	10	99	58	+41	68	
10	Torpoint Athletic	38	17	8	13	70	56	+14	59	
11	Newquay	38	15	4	19	78	91	−13	49	
12	Elburton Villa	38	14	6	18	64	92	−28	48	
13	St Blazey	38	14	4	20	72	72	0	46	
14	Camelford	38	14	4	20	59	79	−20	46	
15	Bovey Tracey	38	13	7	18	62	95	−33	46	
16	Falmouth Town	38	8	5	25	46	84	−38	29	
17	Elmore	38	6	8	24	62	110	−48	26	
18	Cullompton Rangers	38	4	6	28	45	117	−72	18	
19	Tavistock (R)	38	2	5	31	34	107	−73	11	Relegation to Division One East
20	Liskeard Athletic (R)	38	1	5	32	32	140	−108	8	Relegation to Division One West

Updated to match(es) played on 12 May 2014. Source:
Rules for classification: 1) points; 2) goal difference; 3) number of goals scored.
(C) Champions; (R) Relegated

== Division One East ==
South West Peninsula League Division One East
- Champions: Stoke Gabriel
- Promoted: Stoke Gabriel
- Relegated: None
- Matches: 240
- Goals: 989 (4.12 per match)

Division One East featured 16 clubs, the same as the previous season, after Exmouth Town were promoted to the Premier Division, and one new club joined:

- Liverton United, taking voluntary demotion from the Premier Division.
- Exeter Civil Service changed their name to Exwick Villa.

Only Galmpton United and Stoke Gabriel applied for promotion to the Premier Division, pending ground inspections. Galmpton failed, and Stoke Gabriel passed.

Pos	Team	Pld	W	D	L	GF	GA	GD	Pts	Promotion
1	Stoke Gabriel (C, P)	30	23	5	2	100	21	+79	74	Promotion to the Premier Division
2	Teignmouth	30	19	7	4	81	38	+43	64	
3	Galmpton United	30	19	5	6	78	50	+28	62	
4	Exwick Villa	30	17	6	7	82	51	+31	57	
5	Totnes & Dartington	30	13	6	11	71	65	+6	45	
6	Crediton United	30	12	6	12	60	59	+1	42	
7	University of Exeter	30	12	5	13	58	56	+2	41	
8	Alphington	30	11	7	12	64	71	−7	40	
9	Budleigh Salterton	30	11	6	13	64	60	+4	39	
10	Appledore	30	10	6	14	53	49	+4	36	
11	Newton Abbot Spurs	30	10	5	15	55	54	+1	35	
12	Axminster Town	30	8	7	15	52	68	−16	31	
13	Sidmouth Town	30	7	8	15	41	58	−17	29	
14	Okehampton Argyle	30	7	7	16	47	79	−32	28	
15	Liverton United	30	7	4	19	43	119	−76	25	
16	Plymstock United	30	6	6	18	40	91	−51	24	

Updated to match(es) played on 12 May 2014. Source:
(C) Champions; (P) Promoted

== Division One West ==
South West Peninsula League Division One West
- Champions: Callington Town
- Promoted: Callington Town
- Relegated: None
- Matches: 240
- Goals: 1,003 (4.18 per match)

Division One West featured 16 clubs, the same as the previous season, after Godolphin Atlantic were promoted to the Premier Division and Hayle resigned before the season started, taking their reserves' place in the Cornwall Combination. Two new clubs joined:

- Bude Town, promoted as champions of the East Cornwall League.
- Penzance, relegated from the Premier Division.

Despite a record start to the campaign, Mousehole would not accept promotion to the Premier Division this season, even if they won the championship. Only Callington Town, Helston Athletic, Truro City Reserves and Wadebridge Town applied for promotion to the Premier Division, pending ground inspections. All four clubs passed.

Pos	Team	Pld	W	D	L	GF	GA	GD	Pts	Promotion
1	Callington Town (C, P)	30	25	1	4	87	41	+46	76	Promotion to the Premier Division
2	Mousehole	30	23	0	7	68	42	+26	69	
3	Helston Athletic	30	20	1	9	101	50	+51	61	
4	Sticker	30	17	4	9	85	51	+34	55	
5	Penryn Athletic	30	16	6	8	68	43	+25	54	
6	Truro City Reserves	30	17	1	12	76	60	+16	52	Resigned shortly before the 2014–15 season
7	Wadebridge Town	30	15	4	11	76	52	+24	49	
8	Dobwalls	30	15	2	13	63	54	+9	47	
9	St Dennis	30	14	3	13	71	63	+8	45	
10	Vospers Oak Villa	30	13	6	11	59	59	0	45	
11	Porthleven	30	8	7	15	54	70	−16	31	
12	Perranporth	30	7	4	19	46	68	−22	25	
13	Bude Town	30	6	5	19	43	78	−35	23	
14	Penzance	30	6	5	19	41	87	−46	23	
15	Holsworthy	30	7	0	23	37	101	−64	21	
16	Foxhole Stars	30	6	1	23	27	83	−56	19	Resigned shortly before the 2014–15 season

Updated to match(es) played on 14 May 2014. Source:
(C) Champions; (P) Promoted
