= 2020–21 South West Peninsula League =

Football competition in England

The 2020–21 South West Peninsula League season was the 14th in the history of the South West Peninsula League, a football competition in England, that feeds the Premier Division of the Western Football League. The league was formed in 2007 from the merger of the Devon County League and the South Western League, and is restricted to clubs based in Cornwall and Devon. The two divisions of the South West Peninsula League are on the same level of the National League System as the Western League Division One (Step 6).

The constitution was announced on 21 July 2020.

After the abandonment of the previous season due to the COVID-19 pandemic, the league's constitution remained unchanged.

This season, the top two clubs in each division were to be promoted to Step 5. The bottom two clubs in each division would have been liable to relegation.

By October 2020, the poor start to the season suffered by Stoke Gabriel in Premier Division East had attracted attention from the national press. It was the worst start to the season by any club in the top ten levels of English football.

== Suspension and curtailment ==
Fixtures were temporarily suspended on 30 December 2020, again due to the COVID-19 pandemic, but were later suspended until further notice. The FA curtailed the season for all leagues at steps 3–6 on 24 February, with no further league fixtures to be played.

The scheduled restructuring of non-league football took place at the end of the season. Promotions from Step 6 to 5 were based on points per game across all matches over the two abandoned seasons (2019–20 and 2020–21), while teams were promoted to Step 6 on the basis of a subjective application process.

== Premier Division East ==
South West Peninsula League

Premier Division East features 20 teams, unchanged from the previous season.

Honiton Town and Torridgeside were required to install floodlights at their grounds to maintain their membership of the league. Torridgeside complied in October 2020.

=== League table at time of curtailment ===
Pos	Team	Pld	W	D	L	GF	GA	GD	Pts	Promotion or relegation
1	Torpoint Athletic	15	11	1	3	40	21	+19	34	
2	Ivybridge Town	15	11	0	4	50	14	+36	33	
3	Millbrook	11	10	1	0	43	8	+35	31	Promotion to the Western League Premier Division (Note: Promotions based on points per game calculations from 2019–20 & 2020–21 seasons combined.)
4	Brixham	14	9	3	2	43	16	+27	30	
5	Ilfracombe Town	12	9	1	2	48	9	+39	28	Promotion to the Western League Premier Division
6	Torridgeside	12	8	2	2	50	23	+27	26	
7	Newton Abbot Spurs	13	8	2	3	35	19	+16	26	
8	Dartmouth	15	8	2	5	32	36	−4	26	
9	Elmore	14	7	1	6	39	29	+10	22	
10	Sidmouth Town	12	6	1	5	31	27	+4	19	
11	Torrington	14	5	3	6	43	38	+5	18	
12	Cullompton Rangers	14	5	3	6	34	30	+4	18	
13	Honiton Town	15	5	2	8	38	31	+7	17	
14	Crediton United	14	5	1	8	30	27	+3	16	
15	Bovey Tracey	14	4	1	9	39	44	−5	13	
16	Plymouth Marjon	15	3	3	9	35	42	−7	12	
17	Elburton Villa	13	3	2	8	32	33	−1	11	
18	Axminster Town	12	3	1	8	29	29	0	10	
19	Holsworthy	14	2	2	10	16	31	−15	8	
20	Stoke Gabriel	18	0	0	18	7	207	−200	0	

Source: SWPL
Rules for classification: 1) points; 2) goal difference; 3) number of goals scored.

=== Results table ===
Home \ Away	AXM	BOV	BRX	CRE	CUL	DAR	ELB	ELM	HOL	HON	ILF	IVY	MIL	NAS	PLY	SID	STK	TRP	TRS	TRT
Axminster Town	—			2–2	3–2	1–2		1–3						1–4			15–0			
Bovey Tracey		—	0–6	1–2	2–4		3–4			6–3								0–4		
Brixham	3–0		—		5–0		4–3		3–1				1–1			4–0		2–2	2–1	
Crediton United	2–3	3–1		—			2–0			1–0	0–2									0–1
Cullompton Rangers			1–3	3–0	—				1–0	2–2			2–4			3–6			1–1	
Dartmouth		2–1	0–7			—	2–2		3–0	2–0						2–0	6–2			
Elburton Villa		2–3	1–1				—		1–5			0–3	1–2				9–1			2–3
Elmore						1–0	4–0	—		2–1	1–3							1–4	4–5	
Holsworthy		1–2						1–4	—	0–1		3–1		1–1				2–2		1–4
Honiton Town								1–2	2–1	—	1–5				3–0		17–2			
Ilfracombe Town		8–0		4–1	0–0						—	2–0				3–1		1–2		
Ivybridge Town			4–1	4–1	3–0	8–3		2–1				—	0–1	4–0	4–0	1–2	8–0	5–0		
Millbrook		3–1				3–0		5–1	4–0				—	2–1			15–0			3–1
Newton Abbot Spurs								3–2		2–1	2–0			—	3–3	4–1		1–0		
Plymouth Marjon					1–2	2–2	0–7		2–0		0–3				—		6–0		2–3	2–2
Sidmouth Town	3–1	1–1													2–1	—	6–0		2–6	7–1
Stoke Gabriel		1–18		0–13	0–13			0–10			1–17	0–3		0–8	0–14		—			
Torpoint Athletic	2–1			3–1		2–3				1–0				2–1	7–0			—		5–1
Torridgeside	2–1		2–2	3–2		5–1				3–4					4–2		15–0		—	
Torrington	4–0					2–4		3–3		2–2				2–5			14–0	3–4		—

Source: SWPL
Legend: Blue = home team win; Yellow = draw; Red = away team win.

== Premier Division West ==
South West Peninsula League

Premier Division West also featured 20 teams, unchanged from the previous season.

Dobwalls and St Dennis were required to install floodlights at their grounds to maintain their league status.

=== League table ===
Pos	Team	Pld	W	D	L	GF	GA	GD	Pts	Promotion or relegation
1	Mousehole	15	12	2	1	52	8	+44	38	Promotion to the Western League Premier Division (Note: Promotions based on points per game calculations from 2019–20 & 2020–21 seasons combined.)
2	Saltash United	15	12	2	1	59	22	+37	38	Promotion to the Western League Premier Division
3	Camelford	13	10	2	1	35	13	+22	32	
4	Falmouth Town	13	10	0	3	52	16	+36	30	
5	Dobwalls	14	9	2	3	35	16	+19	29	
6	Bodmin Town	15	8	3	4	41	19	+22	27	
7	Wadebridge Town	15	8	2	5	45	40	+5	26	
8	Newquay	17	7	4	6	34	28	+6	25	
9	Liskeard Athletic	13	8	0	5	45	22	+23	24	
10	St Austell	15	7	3	5	30	31	−1	24	
11	Helston Athletic	10	5	4	1	30	22	+8	19	Promotion to the Western League Premier Division
12	Porthleven	13	5	1	7	18	29	−11	16	
13	Sticker	17	5	1	11	30	48	−18	16	
14	St Dennis	18	4	3	11	35	52	−17	15	
15	Wendron United	13	4	1	8	23	40	−17	13	
16	St Blazey	8	3	2	3	18	14	+4	11	
17	Penzance	15	3	1	11	21	49	−28	10	
18	Callington Town	13	1	1	11	14	54	−40	4	
19	Launceston	12	1	0	11	13	51	−38	3	
20	Godolphin Atlantic (Newquay)	16	0	2	14	14	70	−56	−1 (Note: Saltash United v Godolphin Atlantic (Newquay) on 19 October was a home walkover. Saltash were awarded the win and three points, and Godolphin were deducted three points.)	

Source: SWPL
Rules for classification: 1) points; 2) goal difference; 3) number of goals scored.

=== Results table ===
Home \ Away	BOD	CAL	CAM	DOB	FAL	GAN	HEL	LAU	LIS	MOU	NQY	PEN	POR	STA	STB	STD	SAL	STI	WAD	WEN
Bodmin Town	—	2–2			0–1		3–3	7–1	2–1			3–0	8–1							4–0
Callington Town		—		1–5	1–6				1–5			1–4				1–6			1–9	
Camelford		3–0	—			3–1		3–2			0–0	2–1	2–1	2–0		1–1				
Dobwalls				—	3–1	6–2				0–1	1–1		3–1			2–1		2–0		3–0
Falmouth Town					—	7–0		5–0			2–1	5–1				7–1			2–3	
Godolphin Atlantic (Newquay)	0–4			2–2		—						2–3		0–6	0–7	2–3		2–3		
Helston Athletic					4–3		—				3–3			1–1	3–0			3–2	5–0	
Launceston				1–3				—		0–8	1–2						1–5	0–2		4–1
Liskeard Athletic	3–1					10–1	6–1	4–0	—		4–2	4–0				1–2			3–4	
Mousehole	2–1					8–0				—			3–0	4–0	6–0	3–0	1–2		2–2	
Newquay		0–1	0–2			4–0				1–3	—	4–1				4–1				3–1
Penzance										1–1	0–2	—					0–6			
Porthleven		4–2		3–1	1–3					0–2		2–0	—	3–1				1–4		
St Austell	2–0	2–1							3–1	1–6	2–0			—		1–0	2–5			3–3
St Blazey	1–1	5–1													—		0–0			
St Dennis	2–3		2–3			1–1	2–2					4–2				—				1–3
Saltash United			4–2			H-W			5–1		2–3	5–0		4–4	3–1	6–3	—			
Sticker			0–4	0–3	0–4			4–1	0–2		4–4	4–5	0–1		0–4		1–7	—		
Wadebridge Town	0–2			2–1	1–6			7–2				4–3	0–0	1–2		4–3	3–5	5–3	—	
Wendron United		3–1	1–8			3–1	2–5			0–2						6–2		0–3		—

Source: SWPL
Legend: Blue = home team win; Yellow = draw; Red = away team win.

== Applications from lower leagues ==
Ten clubs applied to join the league from lower leagues for 2021–22.

- Three were accepted:
  - Okehampton Argyle (Devon Football League South & West Division)
  - Ottery St Mary (Devon Football League South & West Division)
  - Penryn Athletic (St Piran Football League West Division)
- Seven were unsuccessful:
  - Braunton (Devon Football League North & East Division) – withdrew
  - Bude Town (St Piran Football League East Division) – no planning permission for floodlights
  - Hayle (St Piran Football League West Division) – withdrew
  - Newtown (Devon Football League North & East Division) – groundsharing proposal which was not in place by the required date
  - Teignmouth (Devon Football League North & East Division) – no planning permission for floodlights
  - Truro City Reserves – not members of a feeder league
  - University of Exeter (Devon Football League North & East Division) – withdrew
