= 2019–20 South West Peninsula League =

Football competition in England

The 2019–20 South West Peninsula League season was the 13th in the history of the South West Peninsula League, a football competition in England, that feeds the Premier Division of the Western Football League. The league was formed in 2007 from the merger of the Devon County League and the South Western League, and is restricted to clubs based in Cornwall and Devon. The two divisions of the South West Peninsula League are on the same level of the National League System as the Western League Division One (Step 6).

The constitution was announced on 19 May 2019.

Starting this season, the league consisted of two Step 6 divisions of twenty clubs each. These two divisions were made up of the 2018–19 Step 6 (Premier Division) clubs, plus others promoted from Step 7 and below. There is no longer a Step 7 division within this league.

This season, the top two clubs in each division were to be promoted to Step 5. The bottom two clubs in each division were liable to relegation.

== League suspension and season abandonment ==
On 13 March 2020, on advice from the Football Association, the league announced that all South West Peninsula League matches would be suspended due to the coronavirus pandemic, initially for a period of ten days. On 16 March, the FA decided to postpone all matches across all FA Competitions until 3 April, and a league statement confirmed the postponement of all matches for the foreseeable future.

On 26 March 2020, the league season was formally abandoned, with all results being expunged, and no promotion or relegation taking place to or from the two divisions. On 30 March 2020, sixty-six non-league clubs sent an open letter to the Football Association requesting that they reconsider their decision.

== Premier Division East ==
South West Peninsula League
- Champions: none
- Promoted: none
- Relegated: none

The new Premier Division East featured 20 teams:

- Five from the old Premier Division (Step 6): Cullompton Rangers, Elburton Villa, Ivybridge Town, Millbrook and Torpoint Athletic.
- Eleven promoted from the old Division One East (Step 7): Axminster Town, Bovey Tracey, Brixham, Crediton United, Elmore, Honiton Town, Ilfracombe Town, Newton Abbot Spurs, Sidmouth Town, Stoke Gabriel and Torridgeside.
- Two promoted from the old Division One West (Step 7): Holsworthy and Plymouth Marjon.
- One promoted from the South Devon League (Level 12): Dartmouth.
- One promoted from the North Devon League (Level 12): Torrington.
- Torridgeside must have secured full planning for ground grading G by 31 March 2020, or would have faced demotion at the end of 2019–20, which did not occur following the cancellation late in that season.
- Brixham, Honiton, Stoke Gabriel and Torridgeside were required to install floodlights by 31 March 2021, or face demotion at the end of 2020–21. Stoke Gabriel complied in July 2019, and Brixham complied in September.

=== League table at the time of abandonment ===
Pos	Team	Pld	W	D	L	GF	GA	GD	Pts
1	Brixham	27	18	4	5	67	33	+34	58
2	Ilfracombe Town	25	17	6	2	77	29	+48	57
3	Torpoint Athletic	25	16	3	6	75	34	+41	51
4	Ivybridge Town	26	15	5	6	51	42	+9	50
5	Cullompton Rangers	25	13	8	4	76	37	+39	47
6	Newton Abbot Spurs	26	15	2	9	61	38	+23	47
7	Millbrook	23	13	4	6	55	28	+27	43
8	Bovey Tracey	20	13	3	4	87	26	+61	42
9	Torridgeside	26	11	4	11	60	55	+5	37
10	Dartmouth	24	9	10	5	47	43	+4	37
11	Elburton Villa	27	9	7	11	45	51	−6	34
12	Honiton Town	22	8	4	10	36	46	−10	28
13	Elmore	23	6	7	10	43	43	0	25
14	Crediton United	22	7	3	12	32	33	−1	24
15	Axminster Town	24	6	6	12	40	62	−22	24
16	Stoke Gabriel	30	7	3	20	46	98	−52	24
17	Plymouth Marjon	29	6	4	19	38	93	−55	22
18	Holsworthy	26	5	6	15	40	70	−30	21
19	Torrington	25	3	5	17	31	97	−66	14
20	Sidmouth Town	23	3	4	16	33	82	−49	13

Updated to match(es) played on 21:55, 13 March 2020 (UTC). Source: SWPL.co.uk
Rules for classification: 1) points; 2) goal difference; 3) number of goals scored.

== Premier Division West ==
South West Peninsula League
- Champions: none
- Promoted: none
- Relegated: none

The new Premier Division West featured 20 teams:

- Eleven from the old Premier Division (Step 6): Bodmin Town, Callington Town, Camelford, Falmouth Town, Godolphin Atlantic (Newquay), Helston Athletic, Launceston, Newquay, St Austell, Saltash United and Sticker.
- Nine promoted from the old Division One West (Step 7): Dobwalls, Liskeard Athletic, Mousehole, Penzance, Porthleven, St Blazey, St Dennis, Wadebridge Town and Wendron United.
- Godolphin Atlantic changed their name to Godolphin Atlantic (Newquay) F.C.
- Dobwalls, Mousehole, St Dennis and Wendron United were required to install floodlights by 31 March 2021, or face demotion at the end of 2020–21. Wendron complied in September 2019, and Mousehole in October.

=== League table at the time of abandonment ===
Pos	Team	Pld	W	D	L	GF	GA	GD	Pts
1	Helston Athletic	26	25	0	1	100	22	+78	75
2	St Austell	28	21	4	3	85	23	+62	67
3	Saltash United	22	19	2	1	107	18	+89	59
4	Mousehole	25	17	6	2	92	22	+70	57
5	Bodmin Town	27	18	3	6	77	44	+33	57
6	Newquay	28	15	3	10	72	47	+25	48
7	Falmouth Town	23	14	3	6	73	36	+37	45
8	Porthleven	23	9	5	9	43	46	−3	32
9	Liskeard Athletic	25	10	1	14	44	66	−22	31
10	Camelford	23	9	3	11	54	50	+4	30
11	St Blazey	26	8	5	13	48	51	−3	29
12	Wendron United	24	9	2	13	44	60	−16	29
13	Dobwalls	22	8	4	10	50	60	−10	28
14	Wadebridge Town	25	6	6	13	51	72	−21	24
15	Launceston	23	7	2	14	42	57	−15	23
16	Penzance	25	5	5	15	27	68	−41	20
17	Callington Town	27	6	2	19	37	90	−53	20
18	St Dennis	25	5	3	17	33	91	−58	18
19	Sticker	28	5	1	22	38	113	−75	16
20	Godolphin Atlantic (Newquay)	27	4	2	21	27	108	−81	14

Updated to match(es) played on 22:51, 11 March 2020 (UTC). Source: SWPL.co.uk
Rules for classification: 1) points; 2) goal difference; 3) number of goals scored.
