= 2007–08 South West Peninsula League =

Football competition in England

The 2007–08 South West Peninsula League season was the first in the history of the South West Peninsula League, a football competition in England, that feeds the Premier Division of the Western Football League. The league had been formed in 2007 from the merger of the Devon County League and the South Western League, and is restricted to clubs based in Cornwall and Devon. The Premier Division of the South West Peninsula League is on the same level of the National League System as the Western League Division One.

== Premier Division ==
South West Peninsula League

The Premier Division featured 18 teams which had played in other leagues the previous season.

Nine were from the South Western League: Bodmin Town, Falmouth Town, Launceston, Liskeard Athletic, Plymouth Parkway, St Blazey, Saltash United, Tavistock and Torpoint Athletic.

Eight were from the Devon County League: Buckland Athletic, Cullompton Rangers, Dartmouth, Elburton Villa, Holsworthy, Ivybridge Town, Newton Abbot Spurs and Witheridge.

One club, Clyst Rovers, had played in the Western League Division One during 2006–07, and had transferred directly from that league.

- There was no relegation from the league this season.

=== League table ===
Pos	Team	Pld	W	D	L	GF	GA	GD	Pts
1	Bodmin Town (C)	34	25	6	3	91	32	+59	81
2	Saltash United	34	22	5	7	83	38	+45	71
3	Plymouth Parkway	34	21	7	6	88	49	+39	70
4	Falmouth Town	34	18	8	8	87	41	+46	62
5	Launceston	34	19	4	11	76	55	+21	61
6	Torpoint Athletic	34	18	7	9	57	49	+8	61
7	Dartmouth	34	17	8	9	64	54	+10	59
8	St Blazey	34	14	9	11	74	61	+13	51
9	Witheridge	34	14	6	14	70	56	+14	48
10	Tavistock	34	15	3	16	66	80	−14	48
11	Ivybridge Town	34	11	5	18	54	76	−22	38
12	Newton Abbot Spurs	34	10	7	17	55	86	−31	37
13	Liskeard Athletic	34	11	3	20	64	64	0	36
14	Buckland Athletic	34	8	7	19	53	66	−13	31
15	Elburton Villa	34	6	12	16	58	68	−10	30
16	Holsworthy	34	6	10	18	46	77	−31	28
17	Clyst Rovers	34	7	3	24	42	99	−57	24
18	Cullompton Rangers	34	6	6	22	32	109	−77	24

Updated to match(es) played on 7 May 2008. Source:
Rules for classification: 1) points; 2) goal difference; 3) number of goals scored.
(C) Champions

== Division One East ==
The Division One East featured 17 teams which had played in other leagues the previous season.

Eleven were from the Devon County League: Alphington, Appledore, Budleigh Salterton, Crediton United, Newton Abbot, Ottery St Mary, Plymstock United, Stoke Gabriel, Teignmouth, Totnes & Dartington and University of Exeter.

Three were from the Devon and Exeter League: Axminster Town, Exmouth Town and Okehampton Argyle.

Two were from the South Devon League: Buckfastleigh Rangers and Liverton United.

One other team: Galmpton United.

=== League table ===
Pos	Team	Pld	W	D	L	GF	GA	GD	Pts	Promotion
1	Budleigh Salterton (C)	32	25	5	2	84	21	+63	80	
2	Plymstock United	32	20	4	8	88	43	+45	64	Transferred to Division One West
3	Newton Abbot (P)	32	19	6	7	69	37	+32	63	Promotion to the Premier Division
4	Stoke Gabriel	32	20	3	9	65	35	+30	63	
5	Exmouth Town	32	19	6	7	60	36	+24	63	
6	University of Exeter	32	19	3	10	89	39	+50	60	
7	Totnes & Dartington	32	15	10	7	63	39	+24	55	
8	Appledore	32	15	6	11	71	53	+18	51	
9	Ottery St Mary	32	13	9	10	65	62	+3	48	
10	Axminster Town	32	12	7	13	55	63	−8	43	
11	Okehampton Argyle	32	8	8	16	54	76	−22	32	
12	Alphington	32	9	3	20	51	85	−34	30	
13	Liverton United	32	6	11	15	45	52	−7	29	
14	Galmpton United	32	7	8	17	56	74	−18	29	
15	Teignmouth	32	7	3	22	38	102	−64	24	
16	Crediton United	32	4	6	22	48	91	−43	18	
17	Buckfastleigh Rangers	32	4	2	26	28	121	−93	14	

Updated to match(es) played on 7 May 2008. Source:
Rules for classification: 1) points; 2) goal difference; 3) number of goals scored.
(C) Champions; (P) Promoted

== Division One West ==
The Division One West featured 16 teams which had played in other leagues the previous season.

Nine were from the South Western League: Callington Town, Goonhavern Athletic, Millbrook, Newquay, Penryn Athletic, Penzance, Porthleven, St Austell and Wadebridge Town.

Three were from the Cornwall Combination: Hayle, Mousehole and Wendron CC United.

Three were from the East Cornwall League: Camelford, Dobwalls and Foxhole Stars.

One was from the Devon County League: Vospers Oak Villa.

=== League table ===
Pos	Team	Pld	W	D	L	GF	GA	GD	Pts	Promotion
1	Wadebridge Town (C, P)	30	23	4	3	74	31	+43	73	Promotion to the Premier Division
2	Porthleven	30	22	5	3	98	30	+68	71	
3	Mousehole	30	14	9	7	66	58	+8	51	
4	Camelford	30	14	8	8	63	50	+13	50	
5	Penryn Athletic	30	12	11	7	66	40	+26	47	
6	Newquay	30	15	2	13	70	49	+21	47	
7	Vospers Oak Villa	30	14	4	12	51	49	+2	46	
8	Hayle	30	11	11	8	53	39	+14	44	
9	Dobwalls	30	14	2	14	71	59	+12	44	
10	Foxhole Stars	30	13	2	15	62	68	−6	41	
11	Penzance	30	11	7	12	57	62	−5	40	
12	Millbrook	30	10	8	12	52	48	+4	38	
13	Wendron CC United	30	8	7	15	43	63	−20	31	
14	Callington Town	30	7	2	21	49	79	−30	23	
15	Goonhavern Athletic	30	4	6	20	34	99	−65	18	Left at the end of the season
16	St Austell	30	3	2	25	28	113	−85	8 (Note: St Austell had three points deducted.)	

Updated to match(es) played on 7 May 2008. Source:
Rules for classification: 1) points; 2) goal difference; 3) number of goals scored.
(C) Champions; (P) Promoted
