= 2010–11 South West Peninsula League =

Football competition in England

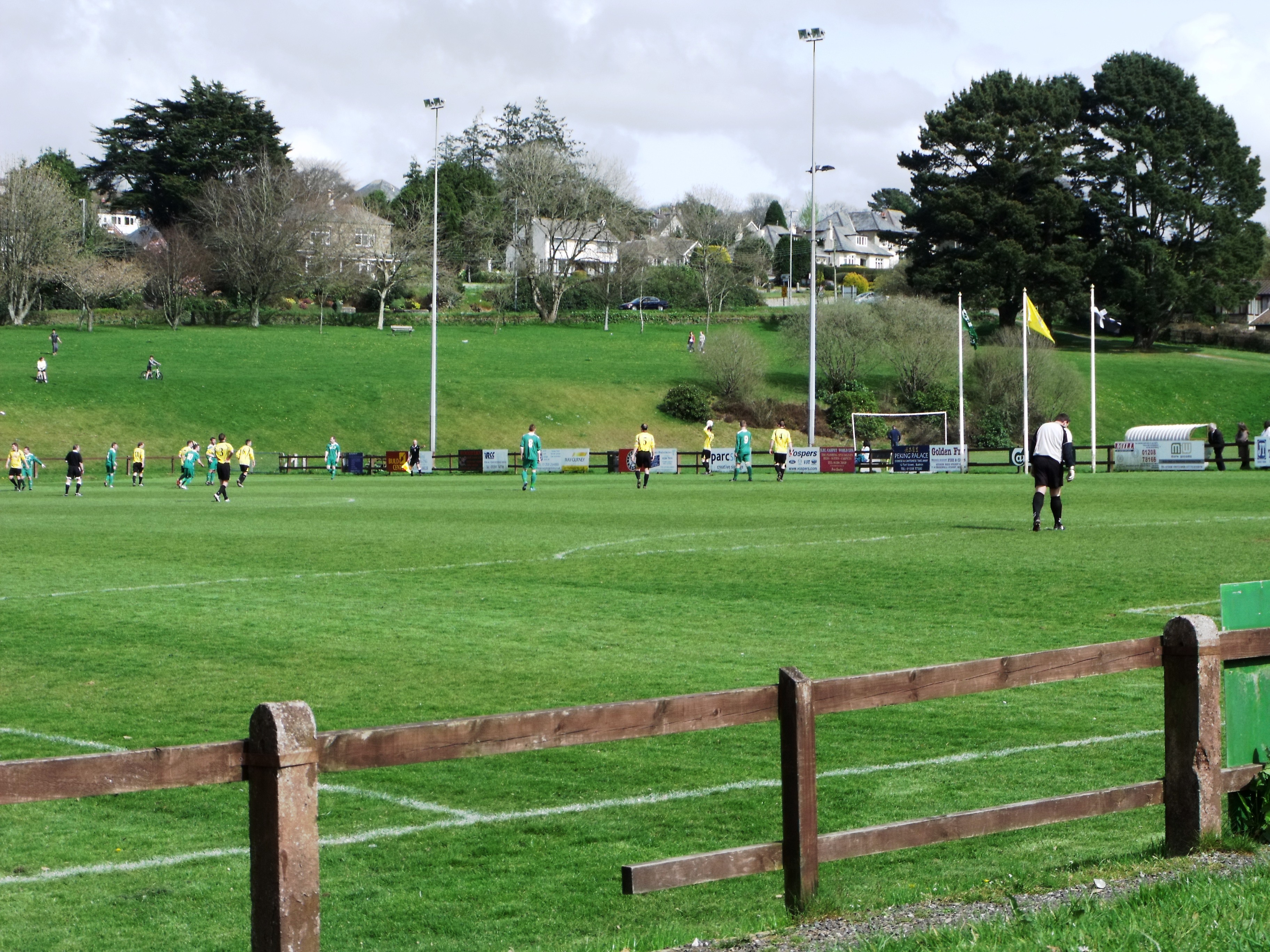
Bodmin Town vs Ivybridge Town in a Premier Division match in April 2011.

The 2010–11 South West Peninsula League season was the fourth in the history of the South West Peninsula League, a football competition in England, that feeds the Premier Division of the Western Football League. The league had been formed in 2007 from the merger of the Devon County League and the South Western League, and is restricted to clubs based in Cornwall and Devon. The Premier Division of the South West Peninsula League is on the same level of the National League System as the Western League Division One.

The champions for the second season in succession were Buckland Athletic.

== Premier Division ==
South West Peninsula League

The Premier Division featured 20 teams, the same as the previous season. Two new clubs joined the league after Clyst Rovers resigned and Holsworthy were relegated to Division One West:

- Royal Marines, champions of Division One East.
- St Austell, runners-up in Division One West.

=== League table ===
Pos	Team	Pld	W	D	L	GF	GA	GD	Pts	Relegation
1	Buckland Athletic (C)	38	31	3	4	131	49	+82	96	
2	Bodmin Town	38	27	7	4	98	38	+60	88	
3	Plymouth Parkway	38	27	5	6	118	49	+69	86	
4	Torpoint Athletic	38	24	7	7	113	54	+59	79	
5	Falmouth Town	38	24	5	9	112	60	+52	77	
6	Saltash United	38	17	6	15	82	70	+12	57	
7	Ivybridge Town	38	17	5	16	98	77	+21	56	
8	St Blazey	38	16	8	14	83	72	+11	56	
9	Penzance	38	16	6	16	74	73	+1	54	
10	St Austell	38	16	6	16	98	98	0	54	
11	Launceston	38	15	8	15	76	84	−8	53	
12	Liskeard Athletic	38	13	8	17	59	69	−10	47	
13	Tavistock	38	13	6	19	58	79	−21	45	
14	Witheridge	38	11	9	18	66	86	−20	42	
15	Royal Marines	38	12	6	20	67	95	−28	42	
16	Cullompton Rangers	38	10	6	22	57	127	−70	36	
17	Bovey Tracey	38	8	9	21	58	104	−46	33	
18	Dartmouth	38	8	6	24	59	111	−52	30	
19	Elburton Villa	38	7	6	25	58	98	−40	27 (Note: Elburton Villa were reprieved from relegation.)	
20	Wadebridge Town (R)	38	5	4	29	44	116	−72	19	Relegation to Division One West

Updated to match(es) played on 7 May 2011. Source:
Rules for classification: 1) points; 2) goal difference; 3) number of goals scored.
(C) Champions; (R) Relegated

== Division One East ==
- Division One East consisted of sixteen clubs, reduced from eighteen the previous season.
- Royal Marines were promoted to the Premier Division and Okehampton Argyle were transferred to Division One West. No new clubs joined the division.
- Galmpton United & Torbay Gents shortened their name to Galmpton Gents.

Pos	Team	Pld	W	D	L	GF	GA	GD	Pts	Promotion
1	Liverton United (C)	30	24	5	1	100	19	+81	77	
2	Budleigh Salterton	30	17	9	4	71	31	+40	60	
3	Stoke Gabriel	30	17	8	5	72	47	+25	59	
4	Teignmouth	30	16	5	9	68	46	+22	53	
5	Galmpton Gents	30	15	5	10	68	55	+13	50	
6	Appledore	30	14	7	9	48	37	+11	49	
7	Alphington	30	12	7	11	49	42	+7	43	
8	University of Exeter	30	12	6	12	60	54	+6	42	
9	Totnes & Dartington	30	13	2	15	55	69	−14	41	
10	Bickleigh	30	11	5	14	40	50	−10	38	Left before the 2011–12 season
11	Exmouth Town	30	10	5	15	54	59	−5	35	
12	Exeter Civil Service	30	9	8	13	41	67	−26	35	
13	Ottery St Mary	30	9	2	19	40	82	−42	29	
14	Newton Abbot Spurs	30	6	8	16	41	64	−23	26	
15	Crediton United	30	6	4	20	40	73	−33	22	
16	Axminster Town	30	4	4	22	29	81	−52	16	

(C) Champions

== Division One West ==
- Division One West consisted of sixteen clubs, reduced from seventeen the previous season.
- St Austell were promoted to the Premier Division, and Wendron CC United and Millbrook left the league. Holsworthy were relegated from the Premier Division and Okehampton Argyle were transferred from Division One East. After this season, they were transferred back again.

Pos	Team	Pld	W	D	L	GF	GA	GD	Pts	Promotion
1	Camelford (C, P)	30	20	8	2	85	27	+58	68	Promotion to the Premier Division
2	Godolphin Atlantic	30	20	5	5	73	37	+36	65	
3	Callington Town	30	20	4	6	85	41	+44	64	
4	Vospers Oak Villa	30	16	8	6	72	40	+32	56	
5	Penryn Athletic	30	15	6	9	76	56	+20	51	
6	Porthleven	30	14	7	9	53	48	+5	49	
7	Plymstock United	30	14	6	10	63	48	+15	48	
8	Perranporth	30	14	6	10	54	40	+14	48	
9	Newquay	30	15	1	14	76	68	+8	46	
10	Holsworthy	30	10	5	15	40	67	−27	35	
11	Dobwalls	30	8	8	14	44	52	−8	32	
12	Truro City Reserves	30	9	3	18	39	76	−37	30	
13	Foxhole Stars	30	7	4	19	41	79	−38	25	
14	Mousehole	30	5	6	19	39	84	−45	21	
15	Okehampton Argyle	30	5	5	20	47	81	−34	20	Transferred to Division One East
16	Hayle	30	4	6	20	30	73	−43	18	

(C) Champions; (P) Promoted
