= 2023–24 FA Vase =

Football Association Vase

Tournament details
- Country: England; Wales; Jersey
- Dates: Qualifying: 26 August 2023 – 23 September 2023; Competition Proper: 21 October 2023 – 11 May 2024
- Teams: Total: 597

Final positions
- Champions: Romford (1st title)
- Runners-up: Great Wakering Rovers

The 2023–24 FA Vase (known for sponsorship reasons as the Isuzu FA Vase) was the 50th season of the FA Vase, an annual football competition for teams playing in levels 9 and 10 (steps 5 & 6) of the English National League System. The competition was played on a regional basis until the 4th round.

The defending champions were Ascot United but they were unable to defend their trophy due to their promotion to the Isthmian League South Central Division.

== Calendar ==
Round	Main date	Number of fixtures	Clubs remaining	New entries this round	Prize money winners	Prize money losers
First round qualifying	Saturday 26 August 2023	193	597 → 404	386	£550	£160
Second round qualifying	Saturday 23 September 2023	174	404 → 230	155	£725	£225
First round proper	Saturday 21 October 2023	102	230 → 128	30	£825	£250
Second round proper	Saturday 11 November 2023	64	128 → 64	26	£900	£275
Third round proper	Saturday 2 December 2023	32	64 → 32	None	£1,125	£350
Fourth round proper	Saturday 13 January 2024	16	32 → 16	None	£1,875	£600
Fifth round proper	Saturday 10 February 2024	8	16 → 8	None	£2,250	£725
Quarter-finals	Saturday 9 March 2024	4	8 → 4	None	£4,125	£1,350
Semi-finals	Saturday 30 March & Saturday 6 April 2024	2	4 → 2	None	£5,500	£1,725
Final	Saturday 11 May 2024	1	2 → 1	None	£30,000	£15,000

== First qualifying round ==
The draw for the first qualifying round was made on 7 July 2023. Faversham was ruled ineligible after their 4–0 win over Horsham YMCA so Horsham YMCA progressed instead.

Tie	Home team (tier)	Score	Away team (tier)	Att.
Friday 25 August 2023
14	West Auckland Town (9)	8–0	Washington (10)	179
56	Paget Rangers (10)	3–2	Stafford Town (10)	80
65	Sherwood Colliery (9)	3–2	Melton Town (9)	150
76	Walsham-le-Willows (9)	1–1 (4–3 p)	Dereham Town (9)	101
79	Thetford Town (9)	5–1	Harleston Town (9)	241
86	Stansted (9)	2–3	Hadleigh United (9)	133
92	West Essex (9)	3–0	Harwich & Parkeston (10)	112
101	Woodford Town (9)	6–2	Park View (10)	82
134	Sandhurst Town (9)	2–4	Highworth Town (9)	91
141	Epsom & Ewell (9)	3–1	AFC Varndeanians (9)	68
166	Hamworthy Recreation (10)	5–1	Fawley (10)	119
6	Whickham (9)	6–0	Campion (9)	177
Saturday 26 August 2023
167	Christchurch (9)	0–1	Moneyfields (9)	48
140	Mile Oak (10)	0–3	Bearsted (9)	40
1	Easington Colliery (10)	3–1	Thornaby (10)	116
2	Chester-le-Street United (10)	1–1 (1–4 p)	Blyth Town (10)	91
3	Crook Town (9)	8–0	Tow Law Town (9)	349
4	Prudhoe Youth Club (10)	2–4	Harrogate Railway Athletic (10)	123
5	Northallerton Town (9)	1–1 (4–3 p)	Chester-le-Street (10)	124
7	Silsden (9)	2–1	Newcastle Blue Star (10)	191
8	Penrith (9)	3–1	Pickering Town (9)	101
9	Garforth Town (9)	1–3	West Allotment Celtic (9)	174
10	Barnoldswick Town (9)	2–2 (4–5 p)	Billingham Synthonia (10)	168
11	Birtley Town (9)	2–0	Sunderland West End (10)	214
12	Carlisle City (9)	5–3	Garstang (10)	120
13	Heaton Stannington (9)	3–0	Thackley (9)	373
15	Padiham (9)	2–1	Jarrow (10)	155
16	Colne (9)	1–3	Newcastle Benfield (9)	137
17	Kendal Town (9)	6–1	Route One Rovers (10)	271
19	Tadcaster Albion (9)	4–2	Boro Rangers (9)	151
20	Shildon (9)	1–2	Knaresborough Town (9)	222
21	Esh Winning (10)	3–6	Redcar Athletic (9)	82
22	Boldon CA (10)	2–1	Steeton (10)	93
23	Chadderton (9)	7–1	Maine Road (10)	135
24	Horbury Town (10)	2–4	Goole (9)	212
25	Staveley Miners Welfare (10)	0–4	Charnock Richard (9)	233
26	Barton Town (9)	0–1	Stockport Georgians (10)	175
27	Northwich Victoria (9)	4–0	Selby Town (10)	111
28	Droylsden (10)	4–1	Wakefield (10)	590
29	Bacup Borough (10)	2–3	Brigg Town (10)	190
30	Bottesford Town (9)	3–3 (4–2 p)	Nostell Miners Welfare (10)	84
31	Lower Breck (9)	3–0	Penistone Church (9)	113
32	Euxton Villa (10)	3–2	Handsworth (9)	74
34	Maltby Main (9)	3–1	Stockport Town (10)	100
35	Ashville (10)	5–1	New Mills (10)	81
36	Armthorpe Welfare (10)	2–2 (5–3 p)	Winsford United (9)	178
37	Swallownest (10)	1–2	Retford (10)	102
38	Wythenshawe (9)	2–2 (2–4 p)	Rossington Main (9)	230
39	Skelmersdale United (9)	1–0	Daisy Hill (10)	84
40	Dronfield Town (10)	4–1	Parkgate (10)	129
42	Cammell Laird 1907 (10)	1–1 (1–3 p)	Burscough (9)	84
43	Prestwich Heys (9)	4–1	Beverley Town (10)	124
44	Frickley Athletic (9)	1–2	Barnton (10)	153
45	Glossop North End (9)	1–0	Cheadle Heath Nomads (10)	199
46	Eccleshall (10)	1–1 (6–7 p)	Hinckley (10)	101
47	Droitwich Spa (10)	4–7	Bilston Town (10)	213
48	Heather St John's (10)	1–3	Lichfield City (9)	72
50	Studley (9)	1–3	Shifnal Town (9)	41
51	Worcester City (9)	8–1	AFC Bridgnorth (10)	431
52	Wolverhampton Casuals (9)	5–2	Coventry Copsewood (10)	41
53	Coventry United (9)	7–1	Cradley Town (10)	69
54	Wednesfield (10)	1–0	Uttoxeter Town (10)	37
55	Nuneaton Griff (10)	0–1	Westfields (9)	65
57	Abbey Hulton United (10)	1–2	Worcester Raiders (9)	72
58	Wolverhampton SC (10)	4–2	Southam United (10)	19
59	Hereford Lads Club (9)	0–3	Alsager Town (10)	68
60	Blackstones (10)	1–3	Boston Town (9)	40
61	Clipstone (10)	2–1	Radford (10)	90
62	Deeping Rangers (9)	3–6	Loughborough Students (9)	89
63	Holwell Sports (10)	2–4	Shirebrook Town (10)	72
64	Sleaford Town (9)	3–3 (4–3 p)	Rainworth Miners Welfare (10)	119
66	Southwell City (10)	9–3	Kirby Muxloe (10)	82
67	Selston (10)	3–1	Harrowby United (10)	62
68	Birstall United (10)	1–1 (2–4 p)	Ingles (10)	42
69	Saffron Dynamo (10)	1–2	Skegness Town (9)	40
70	Leicester St Andrews (10)	2–2 (4–5 p)	AFC Mansfield (9)	77
71	Newark Town (10)	6–0	Holbeach United (10)	112
72	Sandiacre Town (10)	1–5	Hucknall Town (9)	128
73	Heacham (9)	5–1	Kirkley & Pakefield (9)	217
74	Ely City (9)	2–3	Mildenhall Town (9)	178
75	Yaxley (9)	1–1 (4–5 p)	Eynesbury Rovers (9)	56
77	Framlingham Town (10)	7–1	Huntingdon Town (10)	101
80	Great Yarmouth Town (10)	3–4	Histon (9)	112
81	Eaton Socon (10)	1–4	Soham Town Rangers (9)	133
82	Norwich CBS (10)	0–1	Diss Town (10)	86
83	Newmarket Town (9)	6–3	Woodbridge Town (9)	141
84	Godmanchester Rovers (9)	0–3	Wisbech Town (9)	99
85	Ilford (9)	2–2 (5–4 p)	Hackney Wick (10)	122
87	Coggeshall Town (9)	4–1	St. Margaretsbury (10)	55
88	Letchworth Garden City Eagles (10)	1–2	Sawbridgeworth Town (9)	75
89	FC Clacton (9)	1–1 (2–3 p)	Tilbury (9)	125
90	Wivenhoe Town (10)	1–5	Brantham Athletic (9)	65
91	Basildon Town (10)	2–5	Great Wakering Rovers (9)	72
93	Stanway Pegasus (10)	10–1	Haverhill Borough (10)	110
94	FC Romania (9)	0–3	Buckhurst Hill (9)	72
96	Harlow Town (10)	4–0	Newbury Forest (10)	369
97	Little Oakley (9)	1–2	Cockfosters (9)	80

Tie	Home team (tier)	Score	Away team (tier)	Att.
98	White Ensign (9)	1–0	Colney Heath (9)	72
99	Potton United (9)	3–0	Barking (9)	110
100	Hullbridge Sports (9)	5–0	Southend Manor (10)	71
102	Buckingham (10)	1–4	Aylesbury Vale Dynamos (9)	78
103	NW London (10)	5–1	London Samurai Rovers (10)	17
104	Holmer Green (10)	0–9	Milton Keynes Irish (9)	59
105	Wembley (9)	5–1	Long Crendon (10)	57
106	Daventry Town (9)	1–8	Burnham (9)	94
107	Leverstock Green (9)	3–2	Ampthill Town (10)	52
108	Real Bedford (9)	9–1	Rothwell Corinthians (10)	151
109	Wellingborough Town (9)	6–2	London Colney (10)	72
110	Rising Ballers Kensington (10)	3–1	Spelthorne Sports (9)	29
112	Bedfont (10)	0–1	Cogenhoe United (9)	105
113	Langley (10)	2–1	Chalfont St Peter (9)	39
114	Desborough Town (9)	2–4	Arlesey Town (9)	91
115	Easington Sports (9)	2–5	Edgware & Kingsbury (9)	62
116	Crawley Green (9)	5–2	Moulton (10)	41
117	Long Buckby (10)	3–7	FC Deportivo Galicia (10)	57
118	Brook House (10)	2–0	Wallingford & Crowmarsh (9)	46
120	Risborough Rangers (9)	1–7	Flackwell Heath (9)	215
122	Calne Town (10)	2–3	Bradford Town (10)	115
123	Shirehampton (10)	1–1 (4–5 p)	Wantage Town (9)	61
124	Yateley United (10)	0–2	Shortwood United (10)	216
125	Stonehouse Town (10)	2–2 (5–3 p)	Odd Down (10)	97
126	Mangotsfield United (9)	3–0	Thornbury Town (9)	151
127	Oldland Abbotonians (9)	0–3	Brislington (10)	85
128	AEK Boco (10)	1–1 (1–4 p)	Tuffley Rovers (9)	89
129	Portishead Town (10)	4–0	Berks County (10)	164
130	Bitton (10)	1–2	Nailsea & Tickenham (9)	61
131	Slimbridge (9)	4–3	Lyndey Town (9)	105
132	Reading City (9)	6–0	Clanfield (10)	89
133	Keynsham Town (10)	0–1	Longlevens (9)	52
135	Croydon (10)	3–2	Shoreham (9)	82
136	Banstead Athletic (10)	2–1	Colliers Wood United (9)	61
137	Snodland Town (9)	5–1	Tower Hamlets (10)	68
138	Molesey (10)	2–3	AFC Whyteleafe (10)	100
139	Lordswood (9)	5–1	Ash United (10)	50
142	Balham (9)	1–2	Rochester United (10)	27
143	Abbey Rangers (9)	2–0	Horley Town (9)	39
144	Selsey (10)	2–1	Tooting & Mitcham United (9)	172
145	Seaford Town (10)	1–2	Holmesdale (9)	71
146	AFC Uckfield Town (9)	0–4	Staplehurst Monarchs (10)	68
147	Corinthian (9)	5–2	Chessington & Hook United (10)	61
148	Guildford City (9)	2–3	Knaphill (9)	128
149	Sheerwater (9)	3–0	Clapton (10)	49
150	Bridon Ropes (10)	0–4	Tunbridge Wells (9)	63
151	Welling Town (9)	5–1	Sporting Club Thamesmead (10)	44
152	Sutton Athletic (9)	1–1 (4–3 p)	Pagham (9)	55
153	Cobham (9)	3–1	Crowborough Athletic (9)	53
154	Steyning Town (9)	4–1	Oakwood (10)	58
155	Arundel (10)	2–4	Eastbourne United (9)	50
156	Tooting Bec (10)	0–4	Lingfield' (9)	41
157	VCD Athletic (9)	3–1	Redhill (9)	75
158	Billingshurst (10)	1–3	Hollands & Blair (9)	75
159	Camberley Town (9)	0–1	Fisher (9)	71
160	Horsham YMCA (9)	0–4	Faversham Town (9)	90
161	Wick (10)	0–4	Haywards Heath Town (9)	118
162	Loxwood (9)	8–1	East Preston (10)	55
163	Westside (10)	2–1	Faversham Strike Force (10)	26
164	Punjab United (9)	5–1	Godalming Town (10)	73
165	Bridport (10)	2–3	Hamble Club (9)	258
168	East Cowes Victoria Athletic (10)	0–1	Brockenhurst (9)	149
169	Folland Sports (10)	2–2 (3–5 p)	Bournemouth (9)	48
170	Gillingham Town (10)	0–3	Fareham Town (9)	87
171	AFC Portchester (9)	1–1 (3–4 p)	Cowes Sports (9)	228
172	Petersfield Town (9)	0–1	Fleetlands (10)	174
173	Downton (10)	5–0	Ringwood Town (10)	89
174	Alton (9)	5–0	Newport (IOW) (10)	140
175	Whitchurch United (10)	3–2	Verwood Town (10)	58
176	Hythe & Dibden (9)	3–1	Romsey Town (10)	85
177	Sherborne Town (9)	2–3	Millbrook (10)	89
178	Portland United (9)	1–0	United Services Portsmouth (9)	161
179	Farnham Town (9)	2–1	AFC Stoneham (9)	302
180	Cheddar (10)	4–1	Torridgeside (10)	47
181	AFC St Austell (10)	2–1	Bodmin Town (10)	150
182	Falmouth Town (9)	6–0	Honiton Town (10)	215
183	Saltash United (9)	6–0	Radstock Town (10)	108
184	Sidmouth Town (10)	0–2	Camelford (10)	84
185	Welton Rovers (9)	A–A	Wells City (10)	126
186	Bishops Lydeard (10)	0–3	Bude Town (10)	51
187	Crediton United (10)	5–3	Liskeard Athletic (10)	72
188	Dobwalls (10)	3–1	St Blazey (9)	70
189	Wellington (9)	0–3	Okehampton Argyle (10)	60
190	Elburton Villa (10)	3–2	Newton Abbot Spurs (10)	35
191	Bishop Sutton (10)	1–3	Wadebridge Town (10)	34
192	Axminster Town (10)	0–4	Street (9)	104
193	Launceston (10)	0–0 (5–4 p)	Callington Town (10)	121
Sunday 27 August 2023
18	Albion Sports (9)	5–0	Billingham Town (10)	70
33	Worsbrough Bridge Athletic (10)	0–3	Ramsbottom United (9)	148
41	Emley (9)	3–0	Sandbach United (10)	233
49	FC Stratford (10)	1–2	Rugby Borough (9)	77
78	Downham Town (9)	5–1	Swaffham Town (10)	220
95	Benfleet (10)	0–3	Frenford (9)	47
111	Winslow United (10)	8–0	Burton Park Wanderers (10)	123
119	Northampton ON Chenecks (10)	3–1	Oxhey Jets (10)	100
121	Woodley United (10)	3–1	AFC Aldermaston (10)	106
Friday 25 August 2023
185	Welton Rovers (9)	2–2 (2–3 p)	Wells City (10)	171

== Second qualifying round ==
The draw for the Second qualifying round was made on 7 July 2023.

Tie	Home team (tier)	Score	Away team (tier)	Att.
Friday 22 September 2023
5	Whickham (9)	4–2	Birtley Town (9)	241
2	Guisborough Town (9)	5–1	Redcar Town (10)	301
60	Aylestone Park (9)	2–0	Lutterworth Town (9)	312
69	Mulbarton Wanderers (9)	1–3	Walsham Le Willows (9)	103
82	Woodford Town (9)	6–0	Enfield Borough (10)	89
85	Cannons Wood (10)	1–2	Potton United (9)	67
Saturday 23 September 2023
1	Tadcaster Albion (9)	1–2	Blyth Town (10)	150
3	Heaton Stannington (9)	5–1	Ilkley Town (10)	443
4	Easington Colliery (10)	0–6	Crook Town AFC (9)	152
6	Harrogate Railway Athletic (10)	0–3	Albion Sports (9)	135
7	West Allotment Celtic (9)	10–1	AFC Blackpool (10)	91
8	Northallerton Town (9)	2–1	Nelson (10)	114
9	Yorkshire Amateur (10)	0–5	Bishop Auckland (9)	101
10	Kendal Town (9)	4–6	Newcastle University (10)	221
11	Silsden AFC (9)	3–1	Billingham Synthonia (10)	142
12	North Shields (9)	2–3	West Auckland Town (9)	263
13	Redcar Athletic (9)	5–2	Padiham (9)	207
14	Newcastle Benfield (9)	0–1	Carlisle City (9)	159
15	Seaham Red Star (9)	5–0	Sunderland RCA (9)	145
16	Knaresborough Town (9)	5–2	Boldon Community Association (10)	182
17	Ryton & Crawcrook Albion (10)	3–2	Penrith AFC (9)	175
18	Ramsbottom United (9)	3–0	Euxton Villa (10)	170
19	Irlam (9)	4–4 (3–2 p)	Glossop North End (9)	105
20	Ashville (10)	2–2 (5–4 p)	FC St Helens (10).	105
21	Burscough (9)	3–0	Athersley Recreation (9)	119
22	Bottesford Town (9)	2–1	Rossington Main (9)	70
23	Brigg Town (10)	1–3	Emley AFC (9)	251
24	Goole AFC (9)	0–2	Northwich Victoria (9)	203
25	Retford (10)	1–1 (3–5 p)	Droylsden (10)	274
26	Runcorn Town (10)	2–2 (5–4 p)	Skelmersdale United (9)	164
27	Armthorpe Welfare (10)	0–3	Atherton Laburnum Rovers (10)	148
28	Chadderton (9)	0–3	Charnock Richard (9)	81
29	Barnton (10)	0–2	Stockport Georgians (10)	265
30	Pilkington (9)	2–0	Ashton Athletic (10)	110
31	Wythenshawe Town (9)	0–1	South Liverpool (10)	174
32	Prestwich Heys AFC (9)	1–2	Parkgate (10)	139
33	Glasshoughton Welfare (10)	4–2	Maltby Main (9)	152
34	Ashton Town (10)	4–0	Golcar United (9)	172
35	Lower Breck (9)	1–1 (1–4 p)	Hallam (9)	121
36	Market Drayton Town (10)	0–5	Hereford Pegasus (9)	90
37	Wolverhampton Casuals (9)	3–2	Chelmsley Town (10)	53
38	Smethwick Rangers (10)	0–5	Coventry United (9)	23
39	Tividale (9)	1–0	Shawbury United (10)	59
40	Wednesfield (10)	0–6	Whitchurch Alport (9)	49
41	Westfields (9)	1–3	Worcester Raiders (9)	150
42	Racing Club Warwick (9)	0–2	Pershore Town (9)	245
43	Worcester City (9)	2–2 (5–4 p)	Rugby Borough (9)	388
44	Wolverhampton Sporting Community (10)	0–1	Romulus (9)	43
45	Shifnal Town (9)	1–3	Stone Old Alleynians (9)	126
46	Alsager Town (10)	1–1 (3–4 p)	Lichfield City (9)	93
47	Hinckley AFC (10)	9–0	Bewdley Town (9)	229
48	Ashby Ivanhoe (9)	2–1	Bilston Town (10)	223
49	Dudley Town (10)	3–3 (4–3 p)	Coton Green (10)	118
50	Paget Rangers (10)	2–5	Darlaston Town 1874 (9)	90
51	AFC Mansfield (9)	1–2	Kimberley Miners Welfare (9)	62
52	Southwell City (10)	2–4	Eastwood Community (9)	89
53	Shirebrook Town (10)	1–0	Clipstone	344
54	Lutterworth Athletic (10)	2–1	Skegness Town AFC (9)	77
Match was played at Skegness Town AFC.
55	Loughborough Students (9)	9–0	Dunkirk (10)	168
56	GNG Oadby Town (9)	1–4	Sherwood Colliery (9)	32
57	Leicester Nirvana (9)	1–3	Heanor Town (9)	39
58	Ollerton Town (10)	0–6	Sleaford Town (9)	85
59	Boston Town (9)	3–0	Hucknall Town (9)	110
61	Lincoln United (9)	1–1 (7–6 p)	Newark Town (10)	167
62	Gedling Miners Welfare (10)	3–1	Selston (10)	67
63	Ingles (10)	1–1 (3–1 p)	Clifton All Whites (10)	50
65	Heacham (9)	2–0	Dussindale & Hellesdon Rovers (10)	131
66	St Neots Town (9)	0–0 (5–3 p)	Thetford Town (9)	265
67	Histon (9)	2–2 (1–4 p)	Eynesbury Rovers (9)	170
68	Wisbech Town (9)	7–2	Whitton United (10)	156
70	March Town United (9)	3–4	Mildenhall Town (9)	216
71	Diss Town (10)	1–2	Sheringham (9)	154
72	Downham Town (9)	2–1	Newmarket Town (9)	220
73	Barkingside (10)	4–2	Hadleigh United (9)	65
74	Hoddesdon Town (10)	0–2	Wormley Rovers (10)	155
75	Cockfosters (9)	2–0	Haverhill Rovers (10)	110
76	Ilford (9)	2–0	Coggeshall Town (10)	89
Match was played at Coggeshall Town FC.
77	Brantham Athletic (9)	1–2	Frenford (9)	55
78	Sawbridgeworth Town (9)	4–3	Langford (10)	79
79	Stanway Pegasus (10)	3–1	Takeley (9)	50
80	Tilbury (9)	3–0	Baldock Town (9)	160
81	Long Melford (9)	3–2	Holland (10)	75
83	Great Wakering Rovers (9)	4–3	Buckhurst Hill (9)	66
84	Cornard United (10)	2–2 (3–4 p)	White Ensign (9)	47
86	Hullbridge Sports (9)	2–2 (5–4 p)	Harlow Town (10)	135
87	Saffron Walden Town (9)	2–0	Stanway Rovers (9)	291
88	Burnham Ramblers (10)	0–4	Halstead Town (9)	162
90	Cogenhoe United (9)	5–1	Winslow United (10)	88
91	Northampton Sileby Rangers (10)	0–3	London Lions (9)	43
92	Arlesey Town (9)	1–0	Penn & Tylers Green (10)	60

Tie	Home team (tier)	Score	Away team (tier)	Att.
93	Shefford Town & Campton (10)	4–2	Rushden & Higham United (10)	83
94	Wellingborough Town (9)	8–0	FC Deportivo Galicia (10)	83
95	Real Bedford (9)	2–0	Flackwell Heath (9)	221
96	NW London (10)	0–7	Burnham (9)	20
97	Crawley Green (9)	3–0	Leverstock Green (9)	42
99	Edgware & Kingsbury (9)	1–1 (3–1 p)	British Airways (10)	40
100	Aylesbury Vale Dynamos (9)	0–3	Milton Keynes Irish (9)	90
101	Harpenden Town (9)	0–4	Wembley (9)	127
102	Hillingdon Borough (10)	0–5	Bedfont Sports (9)	43
103	Raunds Town (10)	0–2	Bugbrooke St Michaels (9)	72
104	Amersham Town (10)	7–0	Northampton ON Chenecks (10)	61
105	Ardley United (9)	3–2	Langley (10)	52
106	Broadfields United (9)	0–2	Virginia Water (9)	55
107	Rising Ballers Kensington (10)	1–1 (4–3 p)	Wellingborough Whitworth (10)	27
108	Cadbury Heath (10)	1–6	Fairford Town (9)	62
109	Bristol Telephones (10)	2–2 (4–5 p)	Portishead Town (10)	60
110	Chipping Sodbury Town (10)	0–7	Tadley Calleva (9)	44
111	Highworth Town (9)	3–1	Slimbridge AFC (9)	93
112	Hengrove Athletic (10)	0–4	Roman Glass St George (9)	63
113	Shortwood United (10)	3–5	Longlevens (9)	92
114	Brimscombe & Thrupp (9)	1–0	Tytherington Rocks (10)	77
115	Cinderford Town (9)	2–6	Reading City (9)	128
116	Cheltenham Saracens (10)	2–1	Hallen (10)	37
117	Wantage Town (9)	1–0	Wokingham & Emmbrook (9)	123
118	Eversley & California (10)	3–0	Stonehouse Town (10)	78
119	Longwell Green Sports (10)	3–3 (5–4 p)	Bradford Town (10)	115
120	Newent Town (10)	1–2	Woodley United (10)	101
120	Bourton Rovers (10)	W/O	Mangotsfield United (9)	NA
122	Malmesbury Victoria (10)	0–0 (3–4 p)	Tuffley Rovers (9)	108
123	Brislington (10)	2–3	Nailsea & Tickenham (9)	103
124	Fisher (9)	4–0	Bexhill United (9)	148
125	Frimley Green (10)	0–6	Knaphill (9)	78
126	Hollands & Blair (9)	3–0	Worthing United (10)	83
127	Westside (10)	2–4	Snodland Town (10)	15
128	Alfold (10)	0–4	Crawley Down Gatwick (9)	64
129	Haywards Heath Town (9)	5–0	Selsey (10)	203
130	Steyning Town Community (9)	4–2	AFC Whyteleafe (10)	135
131	Tunbridge Wells (9)	3–2	Kennington (9)	174
132	Punjab United (9)	1–0	Lewisham Borough (Community) (10)	71
133	Lordswood (9)	4–1	Croydon (10)	116
134	Canterbury City (10)	1–1 (3–4 p)	Corinthian (9)	87
135	K Sports (10)	0–8	Cobham (9)	56
137	Eastbourne United AFC (9)	1–0	VCD Athletic (9)	97
138	Bearsted (9)	1–1 (4–1 p)	Epsom & Ewell (9)	68
139	Whitstable Town (9)	1–2	Lingfield (9)	288
140	Banstead Athletic (10)	1–3	Roffey (10)	32
141	Lydd Town (9)	5–2	FC Elmstead (10)	120
142	Staplehurst Monarchs (10)	2–0	Forest Hill Park (10)	86
143	Rochester United (10)	1–2	Midhurst & Easebourne (9)	85
144	Forest Row (10)	1–6	AFC Croydon Athletic (9)	97
145	Welling Town (9)	2–3	Holmesdale (9)	63
146	Sheerwater (9)	4–5	Hassocks (9)	55
147	Rusthall (9)	0–2	Newhaven (9)	148
148	Faversham Town (9)	P–P	Loxwood (9)	NA
Match was postponed as Faversham Town was removed due to an ineligible player.
149	Cove (10)	1–5	Glebe (9)	67
150	Abbey Rangers (9)	1–2	Sutton Athletic (9)	35
151	Blackfield & Langley (9)	1–1 (4–3 p)	Brockenhurst (9)	110
Blackfield & Langley were disqualified due to an ineligible player.
152	Alresford Town (10)	0–0 (4–5 p)	Downton (10)	122
153	Alton (9)	1–2	Cowes Sports (9)	162
154	Totton & Eling (10)	2–1	Whitchurch United (10)	79
Totton & Eling didn't advance to the next round because of a refereeing error. The Match would be Replayed.
155	Hamworthy Recreation (10)	5–2	Bournemouth (9)	164
156	Hythe & Dibden (9)	0–2	Baffins Milton Rovers (9)	70
157	Warminster Town (10)	2–4	Fleet Town (9)	170
158	Hamble Club (9)	2–2 (4–1 p)	Andover New Street (9)	102
159	Lymington Town (9)	2–3	Fareham Town (9)	103
160	Wincanton Town (10)	2–4	Portland United (9)	87
161	Moneyfields (9)	2–0	Fleetlands (10)	81
Match was played at Fleetlands FC.
162	Farnham Town (9)	8–0	Millbrook (10)	284
163	Wendron United (10)	2–4	Saltash United (9)	63
164	Millbrook AFC (9)	1–7	Dobwalls (10)	37
165	Okehampton Argyle (10)	3–0	Bude Town (10)	116
166	Ilfracombe Town (9)	1–1 (6–7 p)	Elburton Villa (10)	71
167	AFC St Austell (10)	3–3 (3–0 p)	Sidmouth Town (10)	145
168	Wadebridge Town (10)	0–1	Torpoint Athletic (9)	137
169	Shepton Mallet AFC (9)	1–2	Barnstaple Town (9)	316
170	Cheddar (10)	1–2	Newquay AFC (10)	66
171	Cullompton Rangers (10)	0–2	Wells City (10)	88
172	Torrington (10)	3–0	Launceston (10)	49
173	Falmouth Town (9)	3–1	Crediton United AFC (10)	270
174	Helston Athletic (9)	4–2	Street (9)	95
Sunday 24 September 2023
64	Framlingham Town (9)	1–0	Soham Town Rangers (9)	94
89	May & Baker Eastbrook Community (10)	0–0 (3–1 p)	West Essex (9)	29
98	Hilltop (9)	1–1 (4–3 p)	Brook House (10)	52
136	Greenways (10)	1–1 (4–2 p)	Saltdean United (9)	51
Tuesday 3 October 2023
148	Horsham YMCA (9)	3–0	Loxwood (9)	81
Tuesday 10 October 2023
Replay
154	Totton & Eling (10)	0–2	Whitchurch United (10)	65

== First round proper ==
The 174 winners from the previous round were joined by 30 new teams in this round. Norwich United withdrew resulting in a walkover for May & Baker Eastbrook. The draw was made on 25 September 2023.

Tie	Home team (tier)	Score	Away team (tier)	Att.
Friday 20 October 2023
23	Hinckley AFC (10)	1–4	Stone Old Alleynians (9)	162
Saturday 21 October 2023
82	Crawley Down Gatwick (9)	1–0	Midhurst & Easebourne (9)	69
1	Charnock Richard (9)	3–2	Burscough (9)	163
2	Abbey Hey (10)	1–0	Runcorn Town (10)	123
3	Redcar Athletic (9)	P–P	Silsden AFC (9)	NA
4	Stockport Georgians (10)	P–P	Droylsden (10)	NA
5	Northallerton Town (9)	1–4	Irlam (9)	192
6	Blyth Town (10)	P–P	Crook Town AFC (9)	NA
7	Ashville (10)	P–P	Glasshoughton Welfare (10)	NA
8	Atherton Laburnum Rovers (10)	2–0	Parkgate (10)	100
9	Ryton & Crawcrook Albion (10)	P–P	Cheadle Town (9)	NA
10	West Auckland Town (9)	1–6	Newcastle University (10)	143
11	Squires Gate (9)	1–4	South Liverpool (10)	75
12	Heaton Stannington (9)	P–P	Darwen (10)	NA
13	Emley AFC (9)	2–1	Guisborough Town (9)	275
14	Seaham Red Star (9)	P–P	Knaresborough Town (9)	NA
15	Pilkington (9)	2–2 (3–4 p)	Ramsbottom United (9)	141
16	Carlisle City (9)	5–1	Longridge Town (9)	162
17	Whitley Bay (9)	P–P	Bottesford Town (9)	NA
18	Albion Sports (9)	1–1 (5–4 p)	West Allotment Celtic (9)	64
19	Bishop Auckland (9)	3–0	Northwich Victoria (9)	408
20	Ashton Town AFC (10)	P–P	Whickham (9)	NA
21	Gedling Miners Welfare (10)	P–P	Loughborough Students (9)	NA
22	Brocton (10)	4–0	Aylestone Park (9)	133
24	Ingles (10)	P–P	Boston Town (9)	NA
25	Pershore Town (9)	0–5	Shirebrook Town (10)	162
26	Hallam (9)	P–P	Coventry United (9)	NA
27	Lutterworth Athletic (10)	4–2	Ardley United (9)	260
28	Lincoln United (9)	4–1	Bugbrooke St Michaels (9)	142
29	Kimberley Miners Welfare (9)	P–P	Highgate United (9)	NA
30	Lichfield City (9)	4–1	Romulus (9)	117
31	Newark And Sherwood United (9)	4–3	Wellingborough Town (9)	145
32	Wolverhampton Casuals (9)	3–1	Whittlesey Athletic (10)	41
33	Heanor Town (9)	P–P	Hereford Pegasus (9)	NA
34	Dudley Town (10)	2–2 (7–6 p)	Darlaston Town (9)	276
35	Cogenhoe United (9)	1–3	Eastwood Community (9)	61
36	Ashby Ivanhoe (9)	P–P	Belper United (9)	NA
37	Stourport Swifts (9)	2–1	Sherwood Colliery (9)	145
38	Whitchurch Alport (9)	P–P	Worcester Raiders (9)	NA
39	Worcester City (9)	P–P	Sleaford Town (9)	NA
40	Wisbech Town (9)	P–P	Tividale (9)	NA
41	Saffron Walden Town (9)	3–0	Long Melford (9)	255
42	Norwich United (9)	W/O	May & Baker Eastbrook (10)	NA
43	Potton United (9)	1–3	Hullbridge Sports (9)	153
44	Sawbridgeworth Town (9)	0–3	Tilbury (9)	72
45	Arlesey Town (9)	1–1 (4–2 p)	Eynesbury Rovers	87
46	Mildenhall Town (9)	1–0	Sheringham (9)	165
47	White Ensign (9)	1–0	Wormley Rovers (10)	69
48	Halstead Town (9)	2–2 (4–5 p)	Stanway Pegasus (10)	478
49	Barkingside (10)	3–2	Framlingham Town (10)	66
51	Fakenham Town (9)	4–2	Cockfosters (9)	121
52	Downham Town (9)	1–0	Coggeshall Town (9)	43
53	Shefford Town & Campton (10)	0–2	Crawley Green (9)	95
54	Lakenheath (9)	P–P	Walsham Le Willows (9)	NA
55	St Neots Town (9)	2–2 (2–4 p)	Great Wakering Rovers (9)	227
57	Frenford (9)	1–2	London Lions (9)	52
58	Milton Keynes Irish (9)	0–5	Real Bedford (9)	301
59	Bedfont Sports Club (9)	2–0	Hassocks (9)	127
60	Burnham (9)	3–2	AFC Croydon Athletic (9)	99
61	Little Common (9)	2–3	Tunbridge Wells (9)	112
62	Haywards Heath Town (9)	2–2 (3–1 p)	Eastbourne Town (9)	235
63	Athletic Newham (9)	5–0	Staplehurst Monarchs (10)	23
64	Holmesdale (9)	6–4	Corinthian (9)	65
65	Newhaven (9)	1–1 (4–2 p)	Sporting Bengal United (9)	151

Tie	Home team (tier)	Score	Away team (tier)	Att.
66	Larkfield & New Hythe Wanderers (10)	0–1	Glebe (9)	80
67	Snodland Town (10)	2–0	Stansfeld (9)	89
68	Fleet Town (9)	2–2 (2–3 p)	Amersham Town (10)	110
69	Punjab United (9)	11–1	Lydd Town (9)	80
70	Virginia Water (9)	1–1 (3–4 p)	Woodley United (10)	78
71	Roffey (10)	P–P	Lordswood (9)	NA
72	Steyning Town Community (9)	2–1	Reading City (9)	118
73	Sutton Athletic (9)	0–3	Holyport (9)	40
74	Greenways (10)	1–4	Lingfield (9)	46
75	Fisher (9)	1–3	Wembley (9)	168
76	North Greenford United (9)	3–2	Hollands & Blair (9)	64
77	Farnham Town (9)	1–0	Rising Ballers Kensington (10)	426
78	Hilltop (9)	1–0	Knaphill (9)	34
79	Horsham YMCA (9)	1–1 (3–4 p)	Eversley & California (10)	142
80	Cobham (9)	2–1	Edgware & Kingsbury (9)	103
81	Eastbourne United AFC (9)	P–P	Bearsted (9)	NA
83	Torpoint Athletic (9)	0–0 (2–4 p)	Portland United (9)	141
84	Royal Wootton Bassett Town (9)	2–1	Elburton Villa (10)	105
85	Brockenhurst (9)	3–0	Tuffley Rovers (9)	166
86	Barnstaple Town (9)	3–0	Okehampton Argyle (10)	212
87	Wantage Town (9)	2–7	Hamble Club (9)	83
88	Fairford Town (9)	2–1	Roman Glass St George (9)	66
89	Fareham Town (9)	0–1	Falmouth Town AFC (9)	229
90	AFC St Austell (10)	4–0	Torrington (10)	129
91	Hamworthy Recreation (10)	4–0	Bovey Tracey (10)	82
92	Nailsea & Tickenham (9)	2–0	Mangotsfield United (9)	102
93	Laverstock & Ford (9)	1–1 (4–5 p)	Wells City (10)	105
94	Highworth Town (9)	P–P	Shaftesbury (9)	NA
95	Saltash United (9)	2–0	Portishead Town (10)	140
96	Cowes Sports (9)	7–0	Whitchurch United (10)	137
97	Newquay AFC (10)	2–2 (4–2 p)	Baffins Milton Rovers (9)	134
98	Downton (10)	5–0	New Milton Town (10)	83
99	Tadley Calleva (9)	1–3	Moneyfields (9)	101
100	Brimscombe & Thrupp (9)	P–P	Cheltenham Saracens (10)	NA
101	Longwell Green Sports (10)	3–2	Dobwalls (10)	108
102	Helston Athletic (9)	2–3	Longlevens (9)	87
56	St Panteleimon (9)	P–P	Heacham (9)	NA
Sunday 22 October 2023
50	Dunstable Town (9)	1–2	Woodford Town (9)	220
Tuesday 24 October 2023
71	Roffey (10)	1–0	Lordswood (9)	160
4	Stockport Georgians (10)	3–0	Droylsden (10)	120
12	Heaton Stannington (9)	3–0	Darwen (10)	345
29	Kimberley Miners Welfare (9)	3–5	Highgate United (9)	74
36	Ashby Ivanhoe (9)	4–0	Belper United (9)	118
81	Eastbourne United AFC (9)	3–1	Bearsted (9)	62
6	Blyth Town (10)	2–1	Crook Town AFC (9)	202
20	Ashton Town AFC (10)	2–4	Whickham (9)	116
38	Whitchurch Alport (9)	7–0	Worcester Raiders (9)	107
Wednesday 25 October 2023
56	St Panteleimon (9)	1–0	Heacham (9)	25
Saturday 28 October 2023
7	Ashville (10)	3–3 (5–4 p)	Glasshoughton Welfare (10)	136
9	Ryton & Crawcrook Albion (10)	3–5	Cheadle Town (9)	138
14	Seaham Red Star (9)	1–1 (3–2 p)	Knaresborough Town (9)	71
17	Whitley Bay (9)	0–0 (2–4 p)	Bottesford Town (9)	324
21	Gedling Miners Welfare (10)	1–2	Loughborough Students (9)	84
24	Ingles (10)	2–3	Boston Town (9)	85
26	Hallam (9)	5–1	Coventry United (9)	463
33	Heanor Town (9)	1–0	Hereford Pegasus (9)	143
39	Worcester City (9)	2–0	Sleaford Town (9)	586
40	Wisbech Town (9)	2–2 (3–4 p)	Tividale (9)	202
54	Lakenheath (9)	1–3	Walsham Le Willows (9)	70
94	Highworth Town (9)	2–1	Shaftesbury (9)	89
100	Brimscombe & Thrupp (9)	2–0	Cheltenham Saracens (10)	79
Tuesday 31 October 2023
3	Redcar Athletic (9)	0–4	Silsden (9)	233

== Second round proper ==
The draw for the Second round was made on 23 October 2023. This round saw the entry of twenty-six new teams, joining the 102 winners from the previous round. The fixtures were played on the weekend of 11 November 2023.

Tie	Home team (tier)	Score	Away team (tier)	Att.
Saturday 11 November 2023
42	Holyport (9)	1–2	Jersey Bulls (9)	116
51	Holmesdale (9)	3–1	Haywards Heath Town (9)	70
1	Seaham Red Star (9)	1–6	Irlam (9)	90
2	Abbey Hey (10)	1–4	Silsden (9)	110
3	Ashville (10)	P–P	Holker Old Boys (10)	NA
4	Whickham (9)	1–0	Bury (9)	709
5	Ramsbottom United (9)	2–2 (5–4 p)	Bottesford Town (9)	219
6	Eccleshill United (9)	2–2 (2–4 p)	Charnock Richard (9)	54
7	Carlisle City (9)	2–1	Cheadle Town (9)	138
8	Horden Community Welfare (10)	1–2	South Liverpool (10)	265
9	West Didsbury & Chorlton (9)	2–1	Albion Sports (9)	689
10	Newcastle University (10)	3–0	Atherton Laburnum Rovers (10)	79
11	Stockport Georgians (10)	0–3	Bishop Auckland (9)	301
12	Blyth Town (9)	2–1	AFC Liverpool (9)	211
13	Emley (9)	1–0	Heaton Stannington (9)	438
14	Ashby Ivanhoe (9)	P–P	Brocton (10)	NA
15	Whitchurch Alport (9)	P–P	Lutterworth Athletic (10)	NA
16	Congleton Town (9)	3–1	Loughborough Students (9)	425
17	Newark and Sherwood United (9)	1–4	Lichfield City (9)	182
18	Lincoln United (9)	6–0	Heanor Town (9)	146
19	AFC Wulfrunians (9)	2–3	Stourport Swifts (9)	106
20	Tividale (9)	2–0	Shirebrook Town (10)	94
21	Highgate United (9)	3–1	Pinchbeck United (9)	53
22	Eastwood Community (9)	4–1	Dudley Town (10)	71
23	Boston Town (9)	1–1 (3–0 p)	Stone Old Alleynians (9)	75
24	Wolverhampton Casuals (9)	1–3	Worcester City (9)	169
25	Hallam (9)	3–2	Atherstone Town (9)	463
26	Saffron Walden Town (9)	2–0	Hullbridge Sports (9)	322
27	London Lions (9)	1–1 (5–4 p)	Woodford Town (9)	49
28	Great Wakering Rovers (9)	2–0	Downham Town (9)	128
30	St. Panteleimon (9)	0–1	Mildenhall Town (9)	32
31	Stanway Pegasus (10)	1–0	Barkingside (10)	150
32	Real Bedford (9)	2–2 (6–7 p)	Biggleswade United (9)	244
33	Fakenham Town (9)	2–1	Newport Pagnell Town (9)	212
34	Eynesbury Rovers (9)	0–4	Walsham-le-Willows (9)	119
35	Tilbury (9)	4–0	Tring Athletic (9)	195
36	Romford (9)	2–0	Crawley Green (9)	103
37	Egham Town (9)	3–2	Woodley United (9)	96
38	Bedfont Sports (9)	1–3	North Greenford United (9)	112

Tie	Home team (tier)	Score	Away team (tier)	Att.
39	Burnham (9)	2–2 (11–10 p)	Glebe (9)	96
40	Erith Town (9)	2–0	Peacehaven & Telscombe (9)	109
41	Cobham (9)	4–2	Eversley & California (9)	94
43	Harefield United (9)	2–1	Crawley Down Gatwick (9)	57
44	Amersham Town (10)	3–3 (4–5 p)	Hilltop (9)	106
45	Wembley (9)	3–3 (4–5 p)	Athletic Newham (9)	53
46	Steyning Town Community (9)	0–1	Eastbourne United (9)	121
47	Newhaven (9)	1–4	Deal Town (9)	226
48	Farnham Town (9)	A–A	Snodland Town (9)	NA
49	Roffey (10)	2–1	Punjab United (9)	213
52	Barnstaple Town (9)	2–1	Brimscombe & Thrupp (9)	202
53	Saltash United (9)	0–1	Downton (10)	204
54	Bridgwater United (9)	5–2	Longwell Green Sports (10)	309
55	Clevedon Town (9)	5–0	Brockenhurst (9)	129
56	Royal Wootton Bassett Town (9)	2–1	Longlevens (9)	129
57	Wells City (10)	1–1 (4–3 p)	Portland United (9)	156
58	Hamble Club (9)	5–2	Corsham Town (9)	141
59	Falmouth Town (9)	3–0	Moneyfields (9)	393
60	Nailsea & Tickenham (9)	P–P	Hartpury University (10)	NA
61	Fairford Town (9)	0–1	Hamworthy Recreation (10)	90
62	Highworth Town (9)	5–1	Newquay (10)	112
63	Buckland Athletic (9)	1–3	AFC St Austell (10)	194
64	Cowes Sports (9)	0–1	Brixham (9)	188
Sunday 12 November 2023
29	May & Baker Eastwood Community (10)	1–3	White Ensign (9)	85
50	Lingfield (9)	1–0	Tunbridge Wells (9)	144
Tuesday 14 November 2023
14	Ashby Ivanhoe (9)	P–P	Brocton (10)	NA
Saturday 18 November 2023
3	Ashville (10)	P–P	Holker Old Boys (10)	NA
14	Ashby Ivanhoe (9)	5–3	Brocton (10)	182
15	Whitchurch Alport (9)	1–1 (3–1 p)	Lutterworth Athletic (10)	170
48	Farnham Town (9)	4–1	Snodland Town (9)	451
60	Nailsea & Tickenham (9)	3–5	Hartpury University (10)	77
Match played at Hartpury University.
Tuesday 21 November 2023
3	Ashville (10)	3–0	Holker Old Boys (10)	87
Match played at Holker Old Boys.

== Third round proper ==
The draw for the Third Round was made on 13 November 2023, consisting of the 64 winners from the previous round.

Tie	Home team (tier)	Score	Away team (tier)	Att.
Saturday 2 December 2023
1	Emley (9)	P–P	West Didsbury & Chorlton (9)	NA
2	Ramsbottom United (9)	P–P	Hallam (9)	NA
3	Ashville (10)	P–P	South Liverpool (10)	NA
4	Newcastle University (10)	P–P	Silsden (9)	NA
5	Blyth Town (10)	P–P	Bishop Auckland (9)	NA
6	Whickham (9)	P–P	Irlam (9)	NA
7	Carlisle City (9)	P–P	Charnock Richard (9)	NA
8	Highgate United (9)	P–P	Lichfield City (9)	NA
9	Ashby Ivanhoe (9)	P–P	Tividale (9)	NA
10	Eastwood Community (9)	1–4	Stourport Swifts (9)	134
11	Worcester City (9)	P–P	Boston Town (9)	NA
12	Lincoln United (9)	P–P	Congleton Town (9)	NA
13	Biggleswade United (9)	P–P	Whitchurch Alport (9)	NA
14	London Lions (9)	1–1 (3–4 p)	Stanway Pegasus (10)	73
15	Tilbury (9)	P–P	Saffron Walden Town (9)	NA
16	Fakenham Town (9)	P–P	Great Wakering Rovers (9)	NA
17	Romford (9)	3–0	Mildenhall Town (9)	88
18	Walsham-le-Willows (9)	P–P	White Ensign (9)	NA
19	Lingfield (9)	0–2	Deal Town (9)	124
20	Roffey (10)	1–2	North Greenford United (9)	197
21	Hilltop (9)	P–P	Hamble Club (9)	NA
22	Harefield United (9)	0–1	Jersey Bulls (9)	100
23	Farnham Town (9)	6–0	Burnham (9)	391
24	Eastbourne United (9)	1–1 (4–5 p)	Holmesdale (9)	104
25	Athletic Newham (9)	0–2	Erith Town (9)	34
26	Egham Town (9)	3–4	Cobham (9)	84
27	Hartpury University (10)	2–1	Clevedon Town (9)	69
28	Barnstaple Town (9)	1–2	Falmouth Town (9)	253
29	Hamworthy Recreation (10)	A–A	Wells City (10)	163
30	AFC St Austell (10)	3–3 (1–3 p)	Highworth Town (9)	189
31	Royal Wootton Bassett Town (9)	2–2 (6–7 p)	Bridgwater United (9)	204
32	Brixham (9)	3–2	Downton (10)	157
Saturday 9 December 2023
1	Emley (9)	4–0	West Didsbury & Chorlton (9)	385
2	Ramsbottom United (9)	P–P	Hallam (9)	NA
3	Ashville (10)	P–P	South Liverpool (10)	NA
4	Newcastle University (10)	P–P	Silsden (9)	NA
5	Blyth Town (10)	P–P	Bishop Auckland (9)	NA

Tie	Home team (tier)	Score	Away team (tier)	Att.
6	Whickham (9)	P–P	Irlam (9)	NA
7	Carlisle City (9)	0–4	Charnock Richard (9)	160
8	Highgate United (9)	P–P	Lichfield City (9)	NA
9	Ashby Ivanhoe (9)	P–P	Tividale (9)	NA
11	Worcester City (9)	P–P	Boston Town (9)	NA
12	Lincoln United (9)	2–0	Congleton Town (9)	216
13	Biggleswade United (9)	2–2 (3–4 p)	Whitchurch Alport (9)	103
15	Tilbury (9)	P–P	Saffron Walden Town (9)	NA
16	Fakenham Town (9)	P–P	Great Wakering Rovers (9)	NA
18	Walsham-le-Willows (9)	3–2	White Ensign (9)	109
21	Hilltop (9)	P–P	Hamble Club (9)	NA
29	Hamworthy Recreation (10)	P–P	Wells City (10)	NA
Sunday 10 December 2023
21	Hilltop (9)	5–2	Hamble Club (9)	120
Match played at Bedfont Sports Club.
Saturday 16 December 2023
2	Ramsbottom United (9)	0–1	Hallam (9)	326
Match played at Hallam FC.
3	Ashville (10)	0–3	South Liverpool (10)	184
Match played at South Liverpool.
4	Newcastle University (10)	2–4	Silsden (9)	141
Match played at Silsden AFC.
5	Blyth Town (10)	1–1 (3–1 p)	Bishop Auckland (9)	318
Match played at Bishop Auckland.
6	Whickham (9)	0–1	Irlam (9)	91
Match played at Irlam.
8	Highgate United (9)	1–3	Lichfield City (9)	123
Match played at Lichfield City.
9	Ashby Ivanhoe (9)	2–1	Tividale (9)	88
Match played at Tividale.
11	Worcester City (9)	2-0	Boston Town (9)	180
Match played at Boston Town.
15	Tilbury (9)	0–0 (5–4 p)	Saffron Walden Town (9)	272
Match played at Saffron Walden Town.
16	Fakenham Town (9)	0–3	Great Wakering Rovers (9)	112
Match played at Great Wakering Rovers.
29	Hamworthy Recreation (10)	2–1	Wells City (10)	134
Match played at Wells City.

== Fourth round proper ==
The draw for the Fourth Round was made on 4 December 2023.

Tie	Home team (tier)	Score	Away team (tier)	Att.
Saturday 13 January 2024
1	Hallam (9)	3–1	Silsden (9)	1,015
2	Blyth Town (10)	0–0 (2–4 p)	Whickham (9)	196
3	Emley (9)	3–0	Charnock Richard (9)	439
4	South Liverpool (10)	1–1 (3–5 p)	Lincoln United (9)	352
5	Whitchurch Alport (9)	1–2	Great Wakering Rovers (9)	230
6	Worcester City (9)	2–0	Lichfield City (9)	769
7	Stourport Swifts (9)	3–1	Ashby Ivanhoe (9)	305
8	Romford (9)	2–1	Stanway Pegasus (9)	159

Tie	Home team (tier)	Score	Away team (tier)	Att.
9	Walsham-le-Willows (9)	0–1	Tilbury (9)	244
10	Farnham Town (9)	1–2	Bridgwater United (9)	830
11	Holmesdale (9)	1–3	Highworth Town (9)	193
12	Jersey Bulls (9)	1–1 (4–2 p)	Hamworthy Recreation (10)	560
13	Hilltop (9)	1–1 (3–2 p)	Erith Town (9)	30
14	North Greenford United (9)	2–2 (5–3 p)	Brixham (9)	163
15	Deal Town (9)	2–0	Cobham (9)	716
16	Falmouth Town (9)	2–0	Hartpury University (10)	532

== Fifth round proper ==
The draw for the Fifth Round was made on 15 January 2024.

Tie	Home team (tier)	Score	Away team (tier)	Att.
Saturday 10 February 2024
1	Emley (9)	2–0	Whickham (9)	828
2	Stourport Swifts (9)	1–5	Worcester City (9)	1,903
3	Hallam (9)	P–P	Lincoln United (9)	
4	Bridgwater United (9)	P–P	Deal Town (9)	
5	Tilbury (9)	0–0 (3–5 p)	North Greenford United (9)	664
6	Highworth Town (9)	P–P	Great Wakering Rovers (9)	
7	Jersey Bulls (9)	0–3	Falmouth Town (9)	1,346
8	Hilltop (9)	1–3	Romford (9)	220
Saturday 17 February 2024
3	Hallam (9)	2–2 (5–6 p)	Lincoln United (9)	1,287
4	Bridgwater United (9)	2–2 (5–6 p)	Deal Town (9)	445
6	Highworth Town (9)	2–3	Great Wakering Rovers (9)	365

== Quarter-finals ==
The draw for the quarter-finals was made on 12 February 2024.

Tie	Home team (tier)	Score	Away team (tier)	Att.
Saturday 9 March 2024
1	North Greenford United (9)	0–1	Romford (9)	379
2	Worcester City (9)	4–0	Emley (9)	1,400
3	Lincoln United (9)	1–1 (4–3 p)	Deal Town (9)	922
4	Great Wakering Rovers (9)	2–0	Falmouth Town (9)	694

== Semi-finals ==
The semi finals were played over two legs on Saturday 30 March and Saturday 6 April. The draw was made on 11 March 2024.

=== First leg ===
30 March 2024
15:00 GMT

Romford (9)	2–2	Lincoln United (9)
Dorrell 57'; Siddik 90+4'		Cotton 11'; Dye 90'

Rookery Hill, Corringham
Attendance: 561

6 April 2024
15:00 GMT

Worcester City (9)	1–0	Great Wakering Rovers (9)
Hartley 77'

Sixways Stadium, Worcester
Attendance: 3,189

=== Second leg ===
6 April 2024
15:00 BST

Lincoln United (9)	0–0	Romford (9)
Penalties
Cotton (penalty missed); McMenemy (penalty missed); Liversidge (penalty scored); Priestley (penalty scored); Brooks (penalty scored); Smith (penalty scored); Dye (penalty scored); Steggles (penalty scored); Foster (penalty scored); Jacklin (penalty scored); Griffiths (penalty scored); Cotton (penalty missed)	9–10	(penalty scored) J Hursit; (penalty scored) Pinto; (penalty missed) Deering; (penalty missed) Nalbant; (penalty scored) L Hursit; (penalty scored) Bakare; (penalty scored) Doe; (penalty scored) Luke; (penalty scored) Sutton; (penalty scored) Phillips; (penalty scored) Anderson; (penalty scored) J Hursit

Ashby Avenue, Lincoln
Attendance: 1,475

Lincoln United 2–2 Romford on aggregate. Romford won 10–9 on penalties.

13 April 2024
15:00 BST

Great Wakering Rovers (9)	2–1	Worcester City (9)
Gordon 13'; Gnandi 83'		Hart 34'
Penalties
Boylan (penalty scored); Johnson (penalty scored); Talbot (penalty scored); Martin (penalty missed); Gordon (penalty scored); Nolde (penalty scored)	5–4	(penalty scored) Insall; (penalty scored) Reid; (penalty scored) Mace; (penalty missed) Belmonte; (penalty scored) Dinsley; (penalty missed) Knight

Burroughs Park, Great Wakering
Attendance: 1,502

Great Wakering Rovers 2–2 Worcester City on aggregate. Great Wakering Rovers won 5–4 on penalties.

== Final ==
The final was played at Wembley Stadium on 11 May.

11 May 2024
12:15 BST

Romford (9)	3–0	Great Wakering Rovers (9)
Nalbant 53', 90+4'; Deering 55'

Wembley Stadium, London
Attendance: 19,964
Referee: Will Finne
