= Appledore F.C. =

Association football club in England

Coordinates: 51.047772°N 4.2006974°W

Appledore
- Full name: Appledore Football Club
- Nickname: The Fishermen
- Founded: 1912
- Ground: Marshford, Appledore
- Chairman: Andy Taylor
- Manager: Andy Taylor
- League: Devon League
- 2024–25: Devon League, 4th of 16
| Home colours | Away colours |

Appledore Football Club is a football club based in Appledore, Devon, England. They are currently members of the Devon League and play at Marshford.

== History ==
The club was established in 1912. Under the name Appledore BAAC, they joined the Senior Division North Devon League in 1926. Despite finishing bottom of the division in their first season, the club were not relegated and went on to become league champions in 1928–29. Although they subsequently left the league in 1930, the club returned to play in the Junior Division in 1933–34. They were Junior Division champions at the first attempt, and again in 1935–36.

After World War II Appledore became members of the Senior Division. They were league champions in 1950–51 and went on to win further titles in 1952–53 and 1954–55. The club were runners-up in 1955–56 and won back-to-back titles in the next two seasons. Between 1959–60 and 1961–62 they won three consecutive league championships (the 1959–60 title was won without losing a match), before finishing as runners-up in 1962–63. In 1969 the Senior Division became the Premier Division and the club were champions again in 1974–75.

In 1978 Appledore moved up to the South Western League. They were a mid-table club until finishing bottom of the league in 1988–89. After seven more seasons in mid-table, the club left the league in 1996 to join the Devon County League. They were renamed Appledore in 1998, and remained members of the Devon County League until it merged with the South Western League to form the South West Peninsula League in 2007. The club were placed in Division One East and were runners-up in the division in 2014–15. They withdrew from the league midway through the 2018–19 season, subsequently dropping into the Premier Division of the North Devon League. After a third-place finish in 2021–22 the club moved up to the North East Division of the Devon League. In 2022–23 they won the Torridge Cup, beating Holsworthy 2–1 in the final.

=== Season-by-season ===
| Season | Division | Position | Notes |
|---|---|---|---|
| 1926–27 | North Devon League Senior Division | 9/9 | |
| 1927–28 | North Devon League Senior Division | 5/10 | |
| 1928–29 | North Devon League Senior Division | 1/9 | |
| 1929–30 | North Devon League Senior Division | 3/8 | |
| 1933–34 | North Devon League Junior Division | 1/11 | |
| 1934–35 | North Devon League Junior Division | 6/11 | |
| 1935–36 | North Devon League Junior Division | 1/13 | |
| 1936–37 | North Devon League Junior Division | 6/14 | |
| 1947–48 | North Devon League Senior Division | 9/16 | |
| 1948–49 | North Devon League Senior Division | 3/13 | |
| 1949–50 | North Devon League Senior Division | 5/10 | |
| 1950–51 | North Devon League Senior Division | 1/9 | |
| 1951–52 | North Devon League Senior Division | 5/10 | |
| 1952–53 | North Devon League Senior Division | 1/10 | |
| 1953–54 | North Devon League Senior Division | 3/8 | |
| 1954–55 | North Devon League Senior Division | 1/6 | |
| 1955–56 | North Devon League Senior Division | 2/9 | |
| 1956–57 | North Devon League Senior Division | 1/7 | |
| 1957–58 | North Devon League Senior Division | 1/13 | |
| 1958–59 | North Devon League Senior Division | 2/10 | |
| 1959–60 | North Devon League Senior Division | 1/8 | |
| 1960–61 | North Devon League Senior Division | 1/10 | |
| 1961–62 | North Devon League Senior Division | 1/13 | |
| 1962–63 | North Devon League Senior Division | 2/13 | |
| 1963–64 | North Devon League Senior Division | 6/9 | |
| 1964–65 | North Devon League Senior Division | 4/9 | |
| 1965–66 | North Devon League Senior Division | 3/9 | |
| 1966–67 | North Devon League Senior Division | 7/13 | |
| 1967–68 | North Devon League Senior Division | 6/13 | |
| 1968–69 | North Devon League Senior Division | 4/11 | |
| 1969–70 | North Devon League Premier Division | 7/13 | |
| 1970–71 | North Devon League Premier Division | 5/14 | |
| 1971–72 | North Devon League Premier Division | 8/14 | |
| 1972–73 | North Devon League Premier Division | 3/13 | |
| 1973–74 | North Devon League Premier Division | 2/13 | |
| 1974–75 | North Devon League Premier Division | 1/14 | |
| 1975–76 | North Devon League Premier Division | 2/13 | |
| 1976–77 | North Devon League Premier Division | 2/14 | |
| 1977–78 | North Devon League Premier Division | 9/14 | |
| 1978–79 | South Western League | 14/19 | |
| 1979–80 | South Western League | 7/19 | |
| 1980–81 | South Western League | 6/20 | |
| 1981–82 | South Western League | 15/19 | |
| 1982–83 | South Western League | 14/20 | |
| 1983–84 | South Western League | 8/20 | |
| 1984–85 | South Western League | 7/19 | |
| 1985–86 | South Western League | 14/20 | |
| 1986–87 | South Western League | 14/19 | |
| 1987–88 | South Western League | 12/20 | |
| 1988–89 | South Western League | 18/18 | |
| 1989–90 | South Western League | 11/17 | |
| 1990–91 | South Western League | 9/17 | |
| 1991–92 | South Western League | 7/18 | |
| 1992–93 | South Western League | 10/17 | |
| 1993–94 | South Western League | 14/18 | |
| 1994–95 | South Western League | 11/18 | |
| 1995–96 | South Western League | 15/18 | |
| 1996–97 | Devon County League | 6/20 | |
| 1997–98 | Devon County League | 6/20 | |
| 1998–99 | Devon County League | 6/20 | |
| 1999–00 | Devon County League | 13/20 | |
| 2000–01 | Devon County League | 14/20 | |
| 2001–02 | Devon County League | 19/20 | |
| 2002–03 | Devon County League | 14/20 | |
| 2003–04 | Devon County League | 15/21 | |
| 2004–05 | Devon County League | 18/21 | |
| 2005–06 | Devon County League | 18/20 | |
| 2006–07 | Devon County League | 13/20 | |
| 2007–08 | South West Peninsula League Division One East | 8/17 | |
| 2008–09 | South West Peninsula League Division One East | 4/17 | |
| 2009–10 | South West Peninsula League Division One East | 5/18 | |
| 2010–11 | South West Peninsula League Division One East | 6/16 | |
| 2011–12 | South West Peninsula League Division One East | 12/17 | |
| 2012–13 | South West Peninsula League Division One East | 5/16 | |
| 2013–14 | South West Peninsula League Division One East | 10/16 | |
| 2014–15 | South West Peninsula League Division One East | 2/18 | |
| 2015–16 | South West Peninsula League Division One East | 10/18 | |
| 2016–17 | South West Peninsula League Division One East | 3/18 | |
| 2017–18 | South West Peninsula League Division One East | 12/17 | |
| 2018–19 | South West Peninsula League Division One East | – | Withdrew from league |

== Honours ==
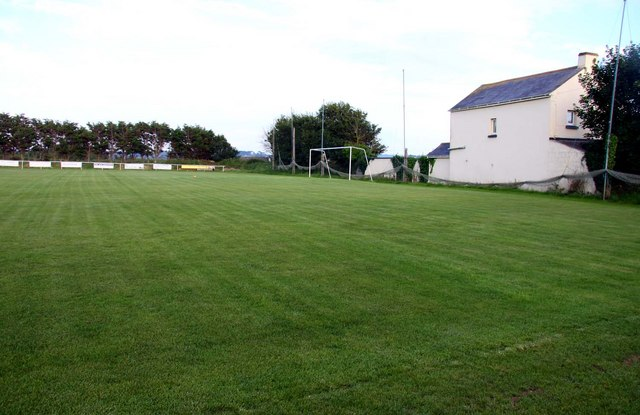
Appledore's Marshford ground

- North Devon League
  - Premier Champions 1928–29, 1950–51, 1952–53, 1954–55, 1956–57, 1957–58, 1959–60, 1960–61, 1961–62, 1974–75
  - Senior Champions 2018–19
  - Intermediate One Champions 2016–17
  - Intermediate 2 Champions 2014–15
  - Junior Division champions 1933–34, 1935–36, 1956–57 (joint)
  - Arlington Cup winners 1931–32, 1932–33, 1933–34
  - Brayford Cup winners 1975–76, 1991–92, 1993–94, 1995–96, 2007–08, 2021–22
  - Combe Martin Cup winners 1949–50, 1950–51, 1951–52, 1960–61, 1989–90, 1994–95, 1995–96
- Devon Premier Cup
  - Winners 1983–84, 2009–10
- Torridge Cup
  - Winners 2022–23

== Records ==
- Best FA Vase performance: Preliminary round, 1980–81, 1981–82
