= Witheridge F.C. =

Association football club in England

Coordinates: 50°54′55.09″N 3°41′51.89″W

Witheridge
- Full name: Witheridge Football Club
- Nickname: Withy
- Founded: 1920
- Ground: Edge Down Park
- Capacity: 2,000
- Chairman: Ryan Manning
- Manager: Sean Hartrey
- League: Devon & Exeter League Division Two
- 2025–26: Devon & Exeter League Division Two, 4th of 11
- Website: https://www.witheridgefc.co.uk/News
Home colours

Witheridge Football Club is a football club based in the Devon village of Witheridge. They are currently members of the Devon & Exeter League Division Two and play at Edge Down Park.

== History ==
Witheridge have come a long way since the days of the Married team and Singles team. Up until the Second World War, Witheridge played their football in the North Devon League. After the war Witheridge didn't rejoin the North Devon League but joined the Tiverton and District league, playing clubs like Bampton and Elmore. In 1971, Witheridge decided it was time to move on from the Tiverton League and joined the Devon and Exeter League, starting in Intermediate Four. The 1970s and 1980s at times were hard for Witheridge but the team kept plugging away and for a small village club managed to keep themselves going. Witheridge did have good times during this period but it wasn't until the 1990s that they started to make people in the Devon and Exeter League look up and take notice that the little village club was beginning to make a big stir.

In 1990, the side won the Express and Echo Shield and they soon started flying through the Devon and Exeter League. 1992 saw Witheridge promoted to Intermediate One then race through Senior Three, Two and One. Then in 1996, Witheridge won promotion to the Devon and Exeter Premier League. In 1997, Andre Pike was appointed as first team manager and from that point on the club went from strength to strength. The 1999/2000 season saw Witheridge finish runners-up in the Devon and Exeter Premier League and also win three cups, the Okehampton Cup, Devon Premier Cup and the East Devon Senior Cup, all within two weeks of each other.

During their spell in the Devon and Exeter premier division, Witheridge became one of the big teams, finishing as runners-up four times in their last 7 seasons in the league. 2006 saw Withy finally promoted to the Devon County League and in their only season managed to finish 11th place, which saw Witheridge promoted into the newly formed South West Peninsula League Premier Division.

In the inaugural season of the South West Peninsula League, Witheridge managed a mid table finish despite being bottom of the league on Christmas Day which included a 12-match unbeaten run which stretched from February to the end of the season.

2009 saw the club take a massive step forward when levelling work was done to the pitch as well as the installation of floodlights at Edge Down Park which allowed the club to enter The FA Vase for the very first time.

During the summer of 2012, the club's changing rooms were completely renovated and a brand new 100-seat stand installed as well as a new pathway down to the stand.

Witheridge Football Club entered the FA Cup for the first time in the clubs 94-year history in August 2014 and won their inaugural match after beating Barnstaple Town 1–0 at Mill Road.

== Ground ==
Witheridge play their home games at Edge Down Park, Fore Street, Witheridge, Tiverton, Devon, EX16 8AH.

== Records ==
- Best FA Cup performance: First qualifying round, 2015–16
- Best FA Vase performance: First round, 2011–12, 2015–16

== Honours ==
- Devon and Exeter League

Runner-up: 1999–2000, 2001–02, 2003–04, 2005–06

- Devon & Exeter League Cup

Winners 1999–2000

- East Devon Cup

Winners 1999–2000

- Okehampton Cup

Winners 1999–2000, 2004–05

- Westward Ho! Cup

Winners 2001–02

- Rowe Charity Cup

Winners 2001–02, 2002–03, 2004–05

== Season-by-season record since 2000 ==
Season	Division	Position
2000–01	Devon and Exeter League Premier Division	3rd
2001–02	Devon and Exeter League Premier Division	2nd
2002–03	Devon and Exeter League Premier Division	5th
2003–04	Devon and Exeter League Premier Division	2nd
2004–05	Devon and Exeter League Premier Division	3rd
2005–06	Devon and Exeter League Premier Division	2nd
2006	Promoted to Devon County League	
2006–07	Devon County League	11th
2007	Joined newly formed South West Peninsula League Premier Division	
2007–08	South West Peninsula League Premier Division	9th
2008–09	South West Peninsula League Premier Division	11th
2009–10	South West Peninsula League Premier Division	10th
2010–11	South West Peninsula League Premier Division	14th
2011–12	South West Peninsula League Premier Division	13th
2012–13	South West Peninsula League Premier Division	7th
2013–14	South West Peninsula League Premier Division	6th
2014–15	South West Peninsula League Premier Division	6th
2015-16	South West Peninsula League Premier Division	7th
2016-17	South West Peninsula League Premier Division	18th
2017-18	South West Peninsula League Premier Division	20th
2018-19	Joined Devon Football League	
2019-20	Season abandoned	
2020-21	Season abandoned	
