= Hayle A.F.C. =

Association football club in England

Hayle
- Full name: Hayle A.F.C.
- Nickname: The Greens
- Ground: Trevassack Park, Hayle
- Chairman: Simon Gardiner
- League: South West Peninsula League Premier Division West
- 2025–26: St Piran League Premier Division West, 2nd of 14 (promoted)

Hayle A.F.C. is a football club based in Hayle, Cornwall. They are currently members of the South West Peninsula League Premier Division West and play at Trevassack Park.

== History ==
Hayle joined the Cornwall Combination in 2001–02, finishing in the top half every season before being promoted to the South West Peninsula League Division One West on its formation in 2007. They spent six seasons in that division with a top finish of third in 2009–10. After manager Anthony Reynolds left in 2013, the club struggled to recruit a new manager, and elected to withdraw from the league before the 2013–14 season.

Hayle dropped back into the Cornwall Combination, and were founder members of the St Piran Football League when it was formed in 2019. When the league was restructured in 2023, Hayle became members of the Premier Division West. They finished runners-up in 2025–26, and gained promotion back to the South West Peninsula League Premier Division West.
