= Plymouth Marjon F.C. =

Association football club in England

Coordinates: 50°25′09.9″N 4°06′44.0″W

Plymouth Marjon
- Full name: Plymouth Marjon Football Club
- Nicknames: Marjons, The Jons
- Founded: 2008
- Ground: The Campus, Derriford Road, Plymouth
- Chairman: Chris Smietanka
- Manager: Vacant
- League: Devon League
- 2024–25: Devon League, 3rd of 16
Home colours	Away colours

Plymouth Marjon Football Club is a football club based in Plymouth, Devon. They are currently members of the Devon League and play at The Campus on Derriford Road.

== History ==
Plymouth Marjon F.C. is the football section of Plymouth Marjon University. In 2015–16, the club won the Plymouth and West Devon League, and was promoted to the South West Peninsula League Division One West. At the end of 2018–19 the league was restructured, and Plymouth Marjon successfully applied for promotion to the Premier Division East, at Step 6 of the National League System.

== Honours ==
- Plymouth and West Devon League
  - Champions 2015–16

== Current first team management ==
Position	Staff
Player-Manager	(England) Vacant
Assistant Manager	(England) Chris Smietanka
First Team Coach	(England) John Dawes
First Team Goalkeeping Coach	(England) Liam Hooks
Head of Performance	(England) Chris Yeoman
