= Budleigh Salterton A.F.C. =

English football club

Coordinates: 50°38′15.28″N 3°19′50.32″W

Budleigh Salterton
- Full name: Budleigh Salterton Association Football Club
- Nickname: The Robins
- Founded: 1913
- Ground: Greenway Lane, Budleigh Salterton
- Chairman: John Pannell
- Manager: Stuart Tuckett & Tim Bradshaw
- League: Devon League
- 2024–25: Devon League, 7th of 16
Home colours

Budleigh Salterton Association Football Club is a football club based in Budleigh Salterton, Devon, England. They are currently members of the Devon League and play at Greenway Lane.

== History ==
The club was established in 1913 and joined the East Devon League, where they played until joining the Exeter & District League in 1919. In 1953 the club were promoted to the Premier Division, but were relegated after finishing bottom of the division in 1954–55. They returned to the Premier Division in 1970, but finished bottom of the table again in 1971–72, resulting in another relegation. The league was then renamed the Devon & Exeter League.

After returning to the Premier Division as Division One champions in 1980–81, Budleigh Salterton were league champions in 1983–84 and retained the title the following season. After finishing as runners-up in 1989–90, they were Premier Division champions for a third time in 1990–91. The club went on to finish as runners-up in three consecutive seasons between 1992–93 and 1994–95, after which they were promoted to the Devon County League. They won the league in their first season, and after winning the Devon Senior Cup in 1996–97, they were league champions again in 1999–2000.

In 2007 Budleigh Salteron were founder members of the South West Peninsula League, joining Division One East. Although they won the division in the league's inaugural season, they were unable to take promotion due to their ground not meeting the required standard. They were runners-up in the division in 2010–11. In 2019 the club were founder members of the new Devon League, becoming members of its North East Division.

== Ground ==
The club played at several different grounds, including Moor Lane and Jubilee Park, until the early 1950s. Budleigh Urban District Council purchased four fields on Greenway Lane from Baron Clinton in February 1953, and the football club gained a lease on the land in October that year.

== Honours ==
- South West Peninsula League
  - Division One East champions 2007–08
- Devon County League
  - Champions 1995–96, 1999–2000
- Devon and Exeter League
  - Premier Division champions 1983–84, 1984–85, 1990–91
  - Division One champions 1980–81
- Devon Senior Cup
  - Winners 1997–98

== Records ==
- Best FA Vase performance: First round, 2003–04, 2007–08, 2010–11
