= South West Peninsula League =

Association football league in England

- Founded: 2007
- Country: England
- Divisions: Premier Division East; Premier Division West
- Number of clubs: 32; 16 (Premier Division East); 16 (Premier Division West)
- Level on pyramid: Level 10
- Feeder to: Western League Premier Division
- Relegation to: St Piran League; Devon League; Somerset County League; Dorset Premier League
- Domestic cup: Walter C Parson Cup
- Current champions: Bovey Tracey (East); Liskeard Athletic (West) (2025–26)
- Website: Official
- Current: 2025–26 Season

The South West Peninsula League (SWPL) is a football competition in England, which was formed in 2007 from the merger of the Devon County League and the South Western League. The league covers Cornwall, Devon, western Somerset and western Dorset.

The league consists of two Premier Divisions (East and West), which are ranked at Step 6 in the National League System. Until 2019–20, there was a single Premier Division at Step 6, and two divisions at Step 7 (Division One West and Division One East).

Subject to applying, receiving the required ground grading and finishing high enough in the league table, one club from each Premier Division can be promoted to the Western League Premier Division each season. As of 2022, six clubs have been promoted from the league – Buckland Athletic after finishing as runners-up in 2012, Plymouth Parkway after finishing as champions in 2018, Tavistock and Exmouth Town who were first and second in 2019, and Falmouth Town and Torpoint Athletic who finished as division champions in 2022.

The bottom three clubs from each Premier Division are liable to relegation to the nearest feeder league. The feeder league for Premier Division West is the St Piran Football League, and the main feeder for Premier Division East is the Devon League.

The league's principal sponsor is Walter C. Parson Funeral Directors, who also sponsor The League Cup competition which is called The Walter C. Parson Cup.

== Champions ==
Season	Premier Division	Division One West	Division One East
2007–08	Bodmin Town	Wadebridge Town	Budleigh Salterton
2008–09	Bodmin Town	Penzance	Exeter Civil Service
2009–10	Buckland Athletic	Perranporth	Royal Marines
2010–11	Buckland Athletic	Camelford	Liverton United
2011–12	Bodmin Town	Newquay	Liverton United
2012–13	Bodmin Town	Godolphin Atlantic	Exmouth Town
2013–14	Plymouth Parkway	Callington Town	Stoke Gabriel
2014–15	St Austell	Helston Athletic	Tavistock
2015–16	Bodmin Town	Mousehole	Tiverton Town Reserves
2016–17	Tavistock	Sticker	Stoke Gabriel
2017–18	Plymouth Parkway	Millbrook	St Martins
2018–19	Tavistock	Liskeard Athletic	Stoke Gabriel

Season	Premier Division West	Premier Division East
2019–20	No champions; season abandoned (coronavirus pandemic)	
2020–21	No champions; season curtailed (local lockdowns)	
2021–22	Falmouth Town	Torpoint Athletic
2022–23	St Blazey	Brixham
2023–24	A.F.C. St Austell	Ivybridge Town
2024–25	Newquay	Sidmouth Town
2025–26	Liskeard Athletic	Bovey Tracy

== South West Peninsula League Cup ==
- 2007–08 – Bodmin Town
- 2008–09 – Bodmin Town
- 2009–10 – Buckland Athletic
- 2010–11 – Plymouth Parkway
- 2011–12 – Bodmin Town – beating Buckland Athletic 6–5 on penalties (0–0 aet)
- 2012–13 – Bodmin Town
- 2013–14 – Plymouth Parkway
- 2014–15 – Godolphin Atlantic
- 2015–16 – Bodmin Town
- 2016–17 – St Austell
- 2017–18 – Falmouth Town

South West Peninsula League Cup finals
Season	Winner	Score	Runner-up	Location	Attendance	Refs
2013–14	Plymouth Parkway (2)		St Austell	Coach Road, Newton Abbot		
2014–15	Godolphin Atlantic		Plymouth Parkway	The Mill, Torpoint		
2015–16	Bodmin Town (5)		Godolphin Atlantic	Pennygillam, Launceston		
2016–17	St Austell		Exmouth Town	Lords Ground, Crediton		
2017–18	Falmouth Town	4–2 (aet)	Tavistock	Bodieve Park, Wadebridge		
2018–19	Saltash United	1–0	Falmouth Town	Blaise Park, St Blazey	585	
2019–20	No winner; season abandoned (coronavirus pandemic)					
2020–21	Not played (local lockdowns)					
2021–22	Torpoint Athletic	3–1	St Blazey	Pennygillam, Launceston	>500	
2022–23	Okehampton Argyle (1)	4–1	Liskeard Athletic	Pennygillam, Launceston	534	
2023–24	Okehampton Argyle (2)	3–1	Elburton Villa	Mill Marsh Park, Bovey Tracey	398	
2024–25	Penzance (1)	0–0 (aet) (8–7 pens)	Cullompton Rangers	Pennygillam, Launceston	533	
2025–26	Penzance (2)	1–1 (aet) (4–3 pens)	Callington Town	Bodieve Park, Wadebridge	577	

== Member clubs ==
The constitutions of the two divisions for 2026–27 are:

Premier Division East
- Axminster Town
- Bishops Lydeard
- Bridport
- Crediton United
- Cullompton Rangers
- Elburton Villa
- Honiton Town
- Ilfracombe Town
- Ilminster Town
- Middlezoy Rovers
- Newton Abbot Spurs
- Okehampton Argyle
- Stoke Gabriel & Torbay Police
- Teignmouth
- Torridgeside
- Torrington
- University of Exeter
Premier Division West
- A.F.C. St Austell
- Bude Town
- Callington Town
- Camelford
- Dobwalls
- Falmouth Town Reserves
- Hayle
- Helston Athletic
- Holsworthy
- Launceston
- Millbrook
- Mousehole
- Penzance
- St Mawgan
- Sticker
- Wadebridge Town
- Wendron United
