= Sidmouth Town A.F.C. =

Association football club in England

Coordinates: 50°41′42″N 3°14′17″W

Sidmouth Town
- Full name: Sidmouth Town Football Club
- Nickname: The Vikings
- Founded: 1895
- Ground: Manstone Lane, Sidmouth
- Chairman: Jay Thorne
- Manager: Billy Rouse
- League: Western League Premier Division
- 2025–26: Western League Premier Division, 5th of 18

Sidmouth Town Association Football Club is a football club based in Sidmouth, Devon, England. They are currently members of the Western League Premier Division and play at Manstone Lane.

== History ==
Sidmouth Town were members of the Exeter and District League for many decades, finishing as runners-up in the Premier Division in 1959–60, and winning it in 1967–68. They won the renamed Devon and Exeter League Premier Division in 2010–11, having finished as runners-up the previous season. They were subsequently promoted to the South West Peninsula League Division One East. At the end of 2018–19 the league was restructured, and Sidmouth successfully applied for promotion to the Premier Division East, at Step 6 of the National League System.

The club competed in the FA Vase for the first time in 2018–19. They won their first-qualifying-round match 3–2 against Keynsham Town and followed that up with a second win, 4–1 against Godolphin Atlantic. Following these two matches, both against sides one level higher in the pyramid, they lost 5–0 in the first round proper to Cadbury Heath, from two levels above them.

The 2024–25 season saw Sidmouth Town promoted to step five for the first time in the club's history, crowned champions of the South West Peninsula Premier Division East.

== Honours ==
- South West Peninsula League
  - Division One East champions 2024–25
- Devon & Exeter League
  - Premier Division champions 1967–68, 2010–11

== Records ==
- Best FA Cup performance: Preliminary round, 2025–26 (ongoing)
- Best FA Vase performance: First round, 2024–25
