= Teignmouth A.F.C. =

Coordinates: 50°33′19.72″N 3°30′37.54″W

Teignmouth
- Full name: Teignmouth Association Football Club
- Nickname: Teigns
- Founded: 1946; 80 years ago
- Ground: Coombe Valley, Teignmouth
- Manager: Liam Jones
- League: South West Peninsula League Premier Division East
- 2024–25: South West Peninsula League Premier Division East, 13th of 16
Home colours

Teignmouth Association Football Club is a football club based in Teignmouth, England. They are currently members of the South West Peninsula League Premier Division East and play at Coombe Valley, Teignmouth.

== History ==
Teignmouth were formed in 1946. In 1982, the club joined the South Western League, leaving six years later. In 1992, Teignmouth became founder members of the Devon County League, before being relegated into the South Devon League in 1999. In 2004, Teignmouth rejoined the Devon County League, winning the league in their first season back. In 2007, Teignmouth became founder members of the South West Peninsula League, being placed in the Division One East. In 2019, Teignmouth became founder members of the Devon League, winning the South West Division three years later.

In 2022, the club was admitted into the South West Peninsula League Premier Division East.

== Ground ==
The club currently play at Coombe Valley, Teignmouth.
