= Devon Football League =

Association football league in England

- Founded: 2019
- Country: England
- Divisions: 1
- Number of clubs: 17
- Level on pyramid: Level 11
- Promotion to: South West Peninsula League Premier Division East
- Relegation to: Devon and Exeter League; North Devon League; Plymouth and West Devon League; South Devon League
- Current champions: Alphington (2025–26)
- Most championships: University of Exeter (3 times)
- Website: Official Website

The Devon Football League is a football competition based in England. It consists of 17 clubs in a single division after four years being split into two divisions, North & East and South & West. The league sits at step 7 of the National League System, or level 11 of the football pyramid.

== History ==
The league was established in 2019 as part of restructuring of football in the south-west of England, in which the South West Peninsula League lost its second tier.

== Member clubs 2026–27 ==
- Alphington
- Appledore
- Bere Alston United
- Boca Seniors
- ~~Brixham Development~~ (withdrawn)
- Budleigh Salterton
- Dartmouth
- Elmore
- Fremington
- Ipplepen Athletic
- Newtown
- Ottery St Mary
- Plymouth Marjon
- Plymstock United
- Thorverton
- Topsham Town
- Winkleigh

== Champions ==
Season	North & East	South & West
2019–20	Season abandoned	
2020–21	Season abandoned	
2021–22	Teignmouth	University of Exeter
2022–23	Beer Albion	Mount Gould
2023–24	University of Exeter	
2024–25	University of Exeter	
2025–26	Alphington	
