= Okehampton Argyle F.C. =

Coordinates: 50°44′1.75″N 3°59′46.98″W

Okehampton Argyle
- Full name: Okehampton Argyle Football Club
- Founded: 1926; 100 years ago
- Ground: Simmons Park, Okehampton
- Chairman: Chris Wills
- Manager: Richard Washburn
- League: South West Peninsula League Premier Division East
- 2025–26: South West Peninsula League Premier Division East, 15th of 16
Home colours

Okehampton Argyle Football Club is an association football club based in Okehampton, England. They are currently members of the South West Peninsula League Premier Division East and play at Simmons Park, Okehampton.

== History ==
Okehampton Argyle were formed in 1926 by a group of railway workers in Okehampton. In 1929, the club joined the West Devon League. In 1932, Okehampton entered the Exeter and District League. In 1993, after 61 years in the Devon and Exeter League, the club joined the South Western League for a three-year stint, before moving back to the Devon and Exeter League. In 2007, the club joined the South West Peninsula League. In 2020, Okehampton joined the Devon League South & West Division for a single season. In 2021, the club was admitted into the South West Peninsula League Premier Division East.

== Ground ==
The club currently play at Simmons Park in Okehampton. Before moving to the site, Okehampton played at North Road in the town.

== Records ==
- Best FA Cup performance: First qualifying round, 2023–24
- Best FA Vase performance: Third round, 2024–25
