= Godolphin Atlantic (Newquay) F.C. =

Association football club in England

Coordinates: 50.419260°N 5.0605439°W

- Full name: Godolphin Atlantic (Newquay) Football Club
- Nicknames: The G, The G's, The G-Men, The G Army
- Founded: 1980
- Dissolved: 3 January 2023
- Ground: Godolphin Way, Newquay
Home colours	Away colours

Godolphin Atlantic (Newquay) Football Club was a football club based in Newquay, Cornwall, England, UK. Affiliated to the Cornwall County Football Association, they played at Godolphin Way.

== History ==
The club was established as Godolphin Atlantic in 1980 at the Godolphin Arms pub in Newquay. They joined Division Three of the Duchy League and the 1981–82 season saw them win the League Cup and gain promotion to Division Two. They were promoted to Division One at the end of the 1992–93 season and then to the Premier Division in 1996. In 1999–2000 the club won the Knock-Out Cup for a second time. The 2004–05 season saw them win the league's Knock-Out Cup and the Junior Cup, and after finishing as Premier Division runners-up, they were promoted to the East Cornwall League.

Godolphin finished third in their first season in the East Cornwall League, also winning the League Cup. The league split into two at the end of the season, with the club placed in the Premier Division. They won the League Cup again in 2007–08, and after finishing as runners-up in 2007–08, they were promoted to joined Division One West of the South West Peninsula League. They were runners-up in 2010–11 and won the division in 2012–13, earning promotion to the Premier Division, where they joined their local rivals Newquay. In 2014–15 they won the League Cup. Following league reorganisation at the end of the 2018–19 season, the club were placed in the Premier Division West, at which point they were also renamed Godolphin Atlantic (Newquay).

On 3 January 2023 the club announced that they had folded due to financial issues and lack of volunteers.

== Honours ==
- South West Peninsula League
  - Division One West champions 2012–13
  - League Cup winners 2014–15
- East Cornwall League
  - League Cup winners 2005–06, 2006–07
- Duchy League
  - Knockout Cup winners 1999–2000, 2004–05
  - League Cup winners 1981–82
- Cornwall Junior Cup
  - Winners 2004–05

== See also ==
- Category:Godolphin Atlantic (Newquay) F.C. players
