= Callington Town F.C. =

Association football club in England

Coordinates: 50.500658°N 4.3156569°W

Callington Town
- Full name: Callington Town Football Club
- Nickname: The Pasty Men
- Founded: 1989
- Ground: Marshfield Parc, Callington
- Manager: Dean Southcott
- League: South West Peninsula League Premier Division West
- 2024–25: South West Peninsula League Premier Division West, 5th of 16
Home colours	Away colours

Callington Town Football Club is a football club based in Callington, Cornwall, England. They are currently members of South West Peninsula League Premier Division West and play at Marshfield Parc.

== History ==
The club was established in 1989 and joined the East Cornwall Combination the following year. They were runners-up in 1994–95 and went on to win back-to-back league titles in 1997–98 and 1998–99. After their second East Cornwall Combination title they moved up to the South Western League, where they spent several seasons in lower-mid table, finishing bottom of the league in 2003–04.

In 2007 Callington became founder members of the South West Peninsula League, and were placed in Division One West. In 2013–14 the club won the division, earning promotion to the Premier Division; they also won the Cornwall Charity Cup, beating Dobwalls 1–0 in the final after extra time. The following season saw them win the league's Charity Vase with a win over Stoke Gabriel. Following league reorganisation at the end of the 2018–19 season, the club were placed in the Premier Division West.

== Ground ==
The club play their home games at Marshfield Parc.

== Honours ==
- South West Peninsula League
  - Division One West champions 2013–14
  - Charity Vase winners 2014–15
- East Cornwall Combination
  - Champions 1997–98, 1998–99
- Cornwall Charity Cup
  - Winners 2013–14

== Records ==
- Best FA Vase performance: Second qualifying round, 2022–23, 2024–25
