= Camelford F.C. =

Association football club in England

Coordinates: 50°37′41.3″N 4°40′11.6″W

Camelford
- Full name: Camelford Football Club
- Nickname: The Camels
- Founded: 1893
- Ground: Trefrew Park, Camelford
- Chairman: Ollie Rowe
- Manager: Bobby Hopkinson
- League: South West Peninsula League Premier Division West
- 2025–26: South West Peninsula League Premier Division West, 5th of 15
Home colours	Away colours

Camelford Football Club is a football club based in Camelford, Cornwall, England. They are currently members of the South West Peninsula League Premier Division West and play at Trefrew Park.

== History ==
The club was established in 1893 and played in the Cornwall Senior League until joining the South Western League in 1955. However, after finishing bottom of the table in 1961–62 and 1962–63 they dropped into the East Cornwall Premier League, taking the place of their reserve team.

In 2007 the club were founder members of the South West Peninsula League, joining Division One West. After winning the division in 2010–11 they were promoted to the Premier Division. Following league reorganisation at the end of the 2018–19 season, the club were placed in the Premier Division West.

== Ground ==
The club played at Tregoodwell until moving to Trefrew Park in 2006.

== Honours ==
- South West Peninsula League
  - Division One West champions 2010–11

== Records ==
- Best FA Vase performance: First round, 2015–16, 2026–27

== See also ==
- Camelford F.C. players
- Camelford F.C. managers
