= Axminster Town A.F.C. =

Association football club in England

Coordinates: 50.790816°N 2.9916944°W

Axminster Town
- Full name: Axminster Town Association Football Club
- Nickname: The Tigers
- Founded: 1903
- Ground: Tiger Way, Axminster
- Chairman: Andrew Hurford
- Manager: John Hurford and Stuart Larcombe (interim)
- League: South West Peninsula League Premier Division East
- 2024–25: South West Peninsula League Premier Division East, 16th of 16

Axminster Town Association Football Club is a football club based in Axminster, Devon, England. They are currently members of the South West Peninsula League Premier Division East and play at Tiger Way in Axminster, England.

== History ==
The club was established in 1903 and joined the Perry Street Junior League. They won the league in 1911–12, and were champions again in three successive seasons between 1919–20 and 1921–22. The club won the league's Challenge Cup in 1922–23, 1939–40 and 1949–50. They were league champions again the following season, and in 1952 the club moved up to Division One of the Exeter & District Senior League. After winning the division in 1952–53, they were promoted to the Premier Division.

In 1958–59 Axminster finished bottom of the Premier Division, and were relegated to Division One. In 1972 they dropped back into the Perry Street & District League. The club were Challenge Cup winners again in 1979–80 and 1992–93, before returning to the (renamed) Devon & Exeter League in 2001, joining Senior Division Four. They won the division at the first attempt, and were promoted to Senior Division Two. The club won this division the following season, earning promotion to Division One.

Axminster were promoted for the fourth successive season in 2003–04, moving up to the Premier Division. They went on to win the Premier Division title in 2006–07, subsequently becoming founder members of Division One East of the South West Peninsula League. The club finished bottom of the division in 2010–11 but avoided relegation. In 2017–18 they entered the FA Vase for the first time. Following league reorganisation at the end of the 2018–19 season, the club were elevated to the Premier Division East.

== Ground ==
The club originally played at Gravelpit Lane. In 1921 they bought a site at Sector Lane, where they played until moving to Tiger Way in 2015.

== Honours ==
- Perry Street & District League
  - Premier Division champions 1911–12, 1919–20, 1920–21, 1921–22, 1950–51
  - Challenge Cup winners 1922–23, 1939–40, 1949–50, 1979–80, 1992–93
- Devon & Exeter League
  - Premier Division champions 2006–07
  - Senior Division One champions 1952–53
  - Senior Division Two champions 2002–03
  - Senior Division Four champions 2001–02
  - Golesworthy Cup winners 2006–07
  - Seaton Challenge Cup winners 1948–49, 1949–50, 1953–54, 2005–06
  - Morrison Bell Cup winners 1919–20, 1922–23
- Devon Intermediate Cup
  - Winners 1977–78, 1983–84, 1986–87, 1999–2000
- East Devon Senior Cup
  - Winners 2005–06
- Football Express Cup
  - Winners 1910–11, 1912–13

== Records ==
- Best FA Vase performance: First qualifying round, 2017–18

== See also ==
- Axminster Town A.F.C. players
