= Holsworthy A.F.C. =

Association football club in England

Coordinates: 50°48′51.27″N 4°21′06.45″W

Holsworthy
- Full name: Holsworthy Association Football Club
- Nickname: The Magpies
- Founded: 1891
- Ground: Upcott Field, Holsworthy
- Capacity: 2000
- Chairman: Steve Lee
- Manager: Kevin Squire
- League: South West Peninsula League Premier Division West
- 2024–25: South West Peninsula League Premier Division West, 7th of 16
Home colours	Away colours

Holsworthy Association Football Club is a football club based in Holsworthy, Devon, England. They play in the South West Peninsula League Premier Division West.

== History ==
The club was formed on 5 October 1891 by a group of local businessmen who met at 'The Rectory' to decide upon funding a football team and also to decide whether that team should play association football or rugby football, with Association Football winning. The club then played in the North Devon League, apart from a short spell of two years in the East Devon League 1924/25 and 1925/26, with their biggest success before the Second World War picking up the Devon Junior Cup in 1938–39. After the War, Holsworthy played their football in Stanhope Park until 1949, when they moved to their present home at Upcott Field. In 1952–53 Holsworthy left the North Devon League and entered the Plymouth & District League, winning the Championship in 1968–69 and again in 1969–70, as well as the Plymouth & District League Victory Cup in 1972–73. Their second season in the Plymouth & District League also saw them pick up the Devon Senior Cup.

In 1971 the club joined the South Western League in 1971. They spent over thirty years in the South Western League, without ever winning the title. However, during this period they did win the Devon Premier Cup in 1971–72 and again in 1978–79.

The 1978 −79 Season was exceptional, as the young team assembled and managed by Terry Andrews were successful on 4 fronts. Winning the Devon Premier Cup 1 v 0 against Western league Elmore, at Plymouth Argyle. Winning the South West Sutton Transformer Cup 6v3 on aggregate – played over 2 legs. Winning the away leg 2v1. Winning the Torridge Cup and Hansen Cup against Appledore.

Also in this period the club entered the FA Vase, three times reaching the First Round Proper. Having to stop playing in the competition when their pitch was classed as to small by the Football Association. Off the pitch floodlights were erected at the Upcott Field in 1997, and they were switched on by the then Plymouth Argyle manager, Mick Jones.

At the end of the 30-year period in the South Western League the club moved sideways in the English league system to the Devon County League in 2003, winning the title at their first attempt, managed by ex Plymouth Argyle legend + captain, Lee Cooper.

For the 2006–07 season, Holsworthy remained in the Devon County League under new manager Mickey Clark. They then joined the South West Peninsula League Premier Division in 2007 as founder members, with Keith Rickard taking the joint managerial role with Mickey Clarke for the 2008–09 season and winning the Torridge Cup that season. However this was followed by a disatraus season where the club was relegated to Division One West finishing bottom of the Premier Division. The club has since remained in Division One West of the South West Peninsula League.

== Reserve Teams ==
In addition to the first team, Holsworthy also have a second team, "The Reserves", which, until the end of the 2005/06 season, played in the North Devon Premier League. They performed well here and actually won the league title in 1975/76. The Reserves joined the East Cornwall League Division 1 for the 2006/07 season but they had to pull out of the league during the 2015/16 season due to the unavailability of players to travel.

The Reserves reformed ahead 2016/17 season, with sees them a return to the North Devon Intermediate 2 Division, gaining promotion to the Intermediate 1 Division for the 2017/18 season. Despite, once again pulling out of the league, the Reserves reformed for the 2022/23 season in the North Devon Senior Division, winning automatic promotion to the Premier Division for the 2023/24 season.

Throughout its history, the club has also boasted a Third team, which traditionally competed in the Kingsley League. In the 2005/06 season, they finished runners up in the league and were winners of the Subsidiary Cup. They had previously competed in this league with some success, before being elected to the North Devon Intermediate 2 Division, where they won the Bideford Tool Cup and the Subsidiary Cup in their first season 1999/2000. They won the Subsidiary Cup again in 2009/10 season.

The Thirds were disbanded for the 2015/16 season in favour of an Under 18's team playing in the Devon County Youth League. The 18's achieved winners of the North Devon League and runners up in the Devon League. The team pulled out due to player unavailability for the 2016/17 season but restarted in the North Devon League for the 2017/18 season. Ahead of the 2023/24 season, the club reintroduced the Third team into the North Devon Intermediate 2 Division. They gained automatic promotion due to a league restructure and now play in the North Devon Intermediate 1 division.

Going into the 2024/25 season the club reintroduced the Under 18s under the management of First team player Jacob Nosworthy.

== Ground ==
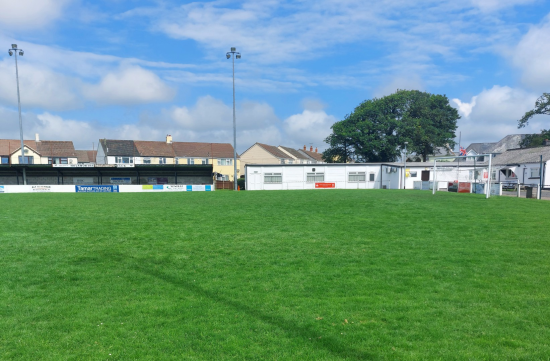
Upcott Field – Clubhouse and Grandstand

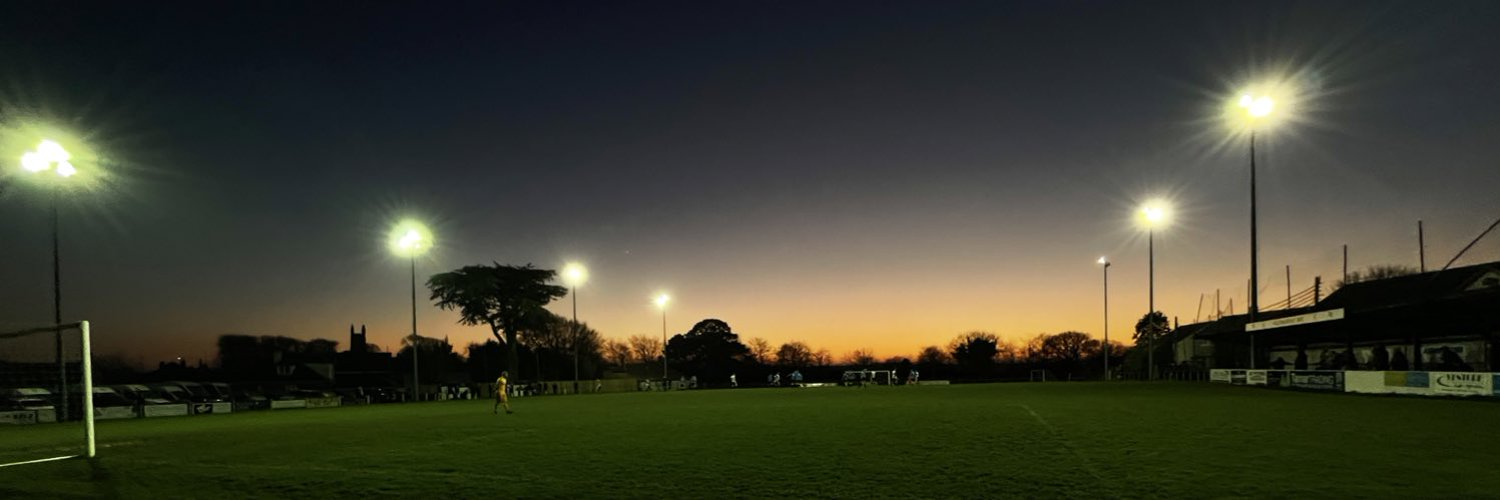
Upcott Field – Matchday

Holsworthy play their games at Upcott Field, North Road, Holsworthy EX22 6HF.

Upcott Field has a capacity of 2,000. However, the club are currently not allowed to compete in the F.A. competitions because their Upcott Field pitch is slightly too small to meet the minimum standards.

== Honours ==
Sutton Transformer South West Cup 1** Winners 978-79 – Manager Terry Andrews

Torridge Cup

  - Winners 1938 −1939
  - Winners 1978 − 1979 – Manager Terry Andrews
  - Runners Up 1996 – 1997 – Manager Peter England
  - Winners 1997 – 1998 – Manager Peter England
  - Winners 2001 − 2002 – Manager Lee Cooper
  - Winners 2002 − 2003
  - Winners 2021 – 2022 – Manager Ryan Hall
  - Runners Up 2022 – 2023 – Manager Ryan Hall

Hansen Cup

  - Winners 1978 −1979 – Manager Terry Andrews
- Devon League
  - Champions (1): 2003 – 2004 – Lee Cooper
- Devon Premier Cup
  - Winners (2): 1971 – 1972 – Manager Terry Andrews,
  - Winners1978 – 1979
  - Runners-up (1): 1969 – 1970
- Devon Senior Cup
  - Winners (1): 1953 – 1954
  - Runners Up (2):1967 – 1968, 1968 – 1969
- Devon Junior Cup
  - Winners (1): 1938 – 1939
  - Runners Up (1): 1936 – 1937
- North Devon League
  - Champions (2): 1923 – 1924 & 1975 – 1976
  - Runners Up (1): 1922 – 1923
- Plymouth & District
  - Champions (2): 1968 – 1969, 1969 – 1970
  - Runners Up (2):1967 – 1968, 1970 – 1971
- Devon League Charity Shield
  - Winners (1): 2004 – 2005
- Launceston Cup (Reserves)
  - Winners (1): 2023-2024 - Manager Adam Wosnitzka

== Club records ==
- Highest League Position: 15th in South West Peninsula League Premier Division 2008–09
- FA Vase Best Performance:

First round 1977–78, – Manager Terry Andrews First round 1979–80 – Manager Terry Andrews First round 1980–81 – Manager Terry Andrews

== Club Officials ==
Position	Name
Chairman	(England) Steve Lee
Vice Chairman	(England) Andrew Langman
Manager	(England) Kevin Squire
Reserves Manager	(England) Adam Wosnitzka
Third Team Manager	(England) Ryan Smith

== Players ==
=== Current squad ===
Note: Flags indicate national team as defined under FIFA eligibility rules; some limited exceptions apply. Players may hold more than one non-FIFA nationality.

No.	Pos.	Nation	Player
—	GK	ENG	Ryan Chadwick
—	RB	ENG	George Tozer

== Former players ==
Players that have played/managed in the football league or any foreign equivalent to this level (i.e. fully professional league).

1. Players with full international caps.

- (England) Michael Preston

2. Shaun Taylor – Exeter – Swindon – Bristol City

3. Dave Walters – Plymouth Argyle

4. Oliver Bray - Manchester Utd (u23s) - Aldershot - Truro (loan) - Dartford (loan)

5. Maximillian ‘Fridge Magnet’ Mcdonald - Bendter over 5-a-Side
