= Devon County League =

Football competition in England

The Devon County Football League was a football competition based in England. It consisted of 20 clubs and sat at step 7 (or level 11) of the National League System.

== History ==
The league was formed in 1992 in order to form an intermediate level between local leagues in Devon and the Western League. It took clubs from the Devon & Exeter League, the North Devon League, the Plymouth & District Combination and the South Devon League.

In 2007 it merged with the South Western League to form the South West Peninsula League, which sits at step 6 of the National League System.

== List of champions ==
Season	Champions
1992–93	Buckfastleigh Rangers
1993–94	Newton Abbot
1994–95	Stoke Gabriel
1995–96	Budleigh Salterton
1996–97	Stoke Gabriel
1997–98	Topsham Town
1998–99	Willand Rovers
1999-00	Budleigh Salterton
2000–01	Willand Rovers
2001–02	Dartmouth
2002–03	Dartmouth
2003–04	Holsworthy
2004–05	Teignmouth
2005–06	Ivybridge Town
2006–07	Dartmouth
