= National League System =

English association football leagues

Division of Level 6 to Level 9 teams in the 2022/23 season

The National League System comprises the six levels of the English football league system immediately below the level of the English Football League. It comes under the jurisdiction of the Football Association. The National League System has a hierarchical format with promotion and relegation between leagues at different levels. For details of leagues above and below the National League System, see the English football league system.

The system underwent a rearrangement from 2004 to 2008 and was rearranged again in 2018. Phase one went into operation in 2004–05. At the start of the 2006–07 season, phase two was introduced, and a further phase three started from 2007–08 with the starting of a second Step 4 league in the north of England. Phase four took effect in 2018–19. Ahead of the 2020–21 season, Step 7 was abolished, being replaced by feeder leagues overseen by local county FAs.

== Organisation ==
At the top of the National League System pyramid is the National League. Its top division, also called the National League (currently called the Enterprise National League), is the only division in the System which is organised on a national rather than regional basis. Although the National League is the top level of the non-league pyramid, it is not the highest level of English football (it is actually the fifth overall division). The Premier League and the three divisions of the English Football League (EFL) comprise the top 92 clubs in the English game; each season, two teams from the National League achieve promotion to the English Football League. Some leagues have more than one division. At the lower levels the existence of leagues becomes intermittent, although in some areas there are as many as twenty layers.

All the leagues are bound together by the principle of promotion and relegation. Clubs that are successful in their league can rise higher in the pyramid, whilst those that finish at the bottom can find themselves sinking further down. In theory it is possible for a lowly local amateur club to rise to the pinnacle of the English game and become champions of the Premier League. While this may be unlikely in practice, there certainly is significant movement within the pyramid. The number of teams promoted between leagues or divisions varies, and promotion is usually contingent on meeting criteria set by the higher league, especially concerning appropriate facilities and finances. In particular, clubs that hope to be promoted from Step 5 leagues to Step 4 must apply in advance to be assessed for whether they meet the grading requirements. The teams must then also finish in the top 3 in their league to be considered for promotion, which is not automatic. For instance, in the 2005–06 season 100 clubs applied to be considered for promotion, of which 51 met the grading requirements, and 29 of those finished in the top 3 in their leagues. With an additional division commencing at Step 4 in 2006–07, all 29 clubs had their promotions accepted.

Under the direction of The Football Association, the National League System evolved over many years. Today's pyramid can be said to be barely twenty years old. Leagues have formed and dissolved over the years and reorganisations have taken place every few years as a result. Beginning with the 2004–05 season, Phase One of the latest change was introduced with the formation of a Conference North and Conference South immediately below the Football Conference, renamed Conference Premier, dropping the top divisions of the Southern League, Isthmian League, and Northern Premier League down one level. The Conference North and South have since been renamed the National League North and South.

== The system ==
This table includes the six steps of the National League System (NLS). Above the NLS are the Premier League and the English Football League. Two teams from the National League can be promoted to EFL League Two at the end of each season. This structure was the result of changes made after the 2005–06 season.

The official name is given for all the leagues listed, and the sponsorship name is also provided for the leagues in the top four steps. All divisions in the top four steps have 20 to 24 clubs each. The FA's National League System Committee determine promotion and relegation between leagues shown, mainly based on location. The NLS Committee also has the power to transfer clubs between divisions and even leagues at the same level of the pyramid should this be deemed necessary to maintain geographically practical and numerically balanced divisions and leagues at every level.

All clubs in the NLS (except Step 6) are eligible to compete in the FA Cup, but are seeded into it according to Step standing. Step 1 to 4 clubs are eligible for the FA Trophy and Step 5 to 6 clubs (and some at NLS Feeder League level) for the FA Vase, as well as their respective regional league cups and county cups.

| Step | League/Division | | | | | | | |
|---|---|---|---|---|---|---|---|---|
| 1 | National League (Enterprise National League) | | | | | | | |
| 1 | Promoted to League Two of the English Football League: Champion and winner of 2nd–7th play-off. Relegated to either National League North or National League South: 4 clubs. Number of leagues: 1. | | | | | | | |
| 2 | National League North (Enterprise North) | | | | National League South (Enterprise South) | | | |
| 2 | Promoted to National League: Champions of each division; the winners of a 2nd–7th play-off in each division will also be promoted. Relegated to Step 3 leagues: 4 clubs from each division. Number of leagues: 2. | | | | | | | |
| 3 | Northern Premier League (Pitching In Northern Premier League); Premier Division | | Southern League (Pitching In Southern League); Central Division | | Southern League (Pitching In Southern League); South Division | | Isthmian League (Pitching In Isthmian League); Premier Division | |
| 3 | Promoted to National League North or South: Champion of each league and 4 winners of divisional play-offs. Relegated to Step 4 leagues: 4 clubs from each division. Number of leagues: 4. | | | | | | | |
| 4 | Northern Premier League (Pitching In Northern Premier League); Division One East | Northern Premier League (Pitching In Northern Premier League); Division One West | Northern Premier League (Pitching In Northern Premier League); Division One Midlands | Southern Football League (Pitching In Southern League); Division One Central | Southern Football League (Pitching In Southern League); Division One South | Isthmian League (Pitching In Isthmian League); Division One South Central | Isthmian League (Pitching In Isthmian League); Division One North | Isthmian League (Pitching In Isthmian League); Division One South East |
| 4 | Promoted to Step 3 leagues: Champion of each league and winner of divisional play-offs. Relegated to Step 5 leagues determined by NLS Committee: 4 clubs from each division. Number of leagues: 8. | | | | | | | |
| 5 | Combined Counties League Premier Division North; Combined Counties League Premier Division South; Eastern Counties League Premier Division; Essex Senior League; Hellenic League Premier Division; Midland League Premier Division; North West Counties League Premier Division; Northern Counties East League Premier Division; Northern League Division One; Southern Counties East League Premier Division; Spartan South Midlands League Premier Division; Southern Combination Premier Division; United Counties League Premier Division North; United Counties League Premier Division South; Wessex League Premier Division; Western League Premier Division | | | | | | | |
| 5 | Promoted to Step 4 leagues determined by NLS Committee: Total of 16 league champions and 16 winners of divisional play-offs. Relegated: 2 clubs from each division. Arranged according to separate agreements with Step 6 leagues. Number of leagues: 16. | | | | | | | |
| 6 | Combined Counties League Division One; Eastern Counties League Division One North; Eastern Counties League Division One South; Hellenic League Division One; Midland League Division One; Northern Counties East Division One; Northern League Division Two; North West Counties League Division One North; North West Counties League Division One South; Southern Counties East League Division One; South West Peninsula League Premier Division East; South West Peninsula League Premier Division West; Spartan South Midlands League Division One; Southern Combination Division One; United Counties League Division One; Wessex League Division One; Western League Division One | | | | | | | |
| 6 | Promotion and relegation: Arranged according to separate agreements with appropriate county feeder leagues. Number of leagues: 17. | | | | | | | |

== History ==
For the 2012–13 season, the FA announced a re-structuring of the National League System's lowest level, Step 7. It was split into three sub-categories, which were full Step 7 divisions, Step 7A and Step 7B. The categorisation depended on the ground facilities of the particular league's clubs. The required percentage of clubs to meet ground grade requirements for each of the categorisations were as follows:

- Step 7: 100%;
- Step 7A: 75%; and
- Step 7B: 60%.

Step 7 – was awarded to leagues where 100% of their clubs met the Step 7 minimum ground grading requirements on 31 March and the league complies with all other requirements for Step 7 status.

Step 7A – was awarded to leagues where 75% or more of their clubs met the Step 7 minimum ground grading requirements after 31 March and the league complied with all other requirements for Step 7 status. (It was noted that in the 2011–12 season these leagues were referred to as provisional.)

Step 7B – was awarded to leagues where 60% or more of their clubs met the ground grading requirements after 31 March and the league complied with all other requirements for Step 7 status.

The sub-categories were removed in the 2016–17 season. In 2020–21, Step 7 was abolished altogether, with former leagues at this step instead being designated NLS Feeder Leagues, organised by county FAs.

Division of Level 9 teams by English Counties (2022–23)

In March 2018, representatives of the National League system confirmed that a pure pyramid in a 1-2-4-8-16 was the goal. This meant the introduction of an eighth division at Step 4 and two further divisions at Step 5. The comments were made just prior to the introduction of the fourth division at Step 3 and the seventh at Step 4. On 17 April 2019, it was clarified that there would be 17 divisions at Step 6, down from 19 in 2018–19 and that the two new divisions at Step 5 would be in the Midlands and the west London/Thames Valley areas. On 24 April, it was announced that the Northern Premier League had been awarded the operation of the eighth division at Step 4. Initially scheduled for implementation in 2020–21, but due to the coronavirus disease pandemic in England which prematurely ended the remainder of the 2019–20 season for leagues at Steps 3 to 6 on 26 March 2020, the FA postponed it to the 2021–22 season when football leagues from Step 2 below had their seasons curtailed again by restrictions from COVID-19 lockdowns on 24 February 2021. The two Step 5 divisions are administered by the Combined Counties and United Counties leagues.

== See also ==
- List of association football competitions
- Hierarchical organisation
- History of the English non-League football system
