= 1924–25 Torquay United F.C. season =

Torquay United
1924–25 season
- Chairman: George Perry
- Manager: Harry Raymond (until December 1924); Fred Mortimer (from December 1924)
- Southern League Western Section: 15th
- FA Cup: First round qualifying
- Devon Professional Cup: Semi-final
- Top goalscorer: League: Billy Kellock (11); All: Billy Kellock (13)
Home colours

The 1924–25 Torquay United F.C. season was Torquay United's fourth season in competitive football and their third season in the Southern League. The season runs from 1 July 1924 to 30 June 1925.

== Overview ==
Following on from their first two years in the Southern League, which had resulted in encouraging 6th and 4th place finishes, Torquay United's third season would prove to be something of a disappointment by comparison. With new player-manager Harry Raymond replacing Crad Evans, financial problems which threatened the continued existence of the club meant that Raymond's team was not as strong as that which had been made available to Evans. The financial crisis eventually resulted in the departure of Raymond in December to be replaced by F.G.B. Mortimer who had previously played for the club during the 1921–22 season. Although the Magpies managed to get the season off to a reasonable start, they were to suffer their biggest defeat to date in November with a humiliating 7–0 loss to Plymouth Argyle Reserves at Home Park. Unfortunately, the Pilgrim Reserves heaped even more misery on Torquay when they visited Plainmoor in January and returned to Plymouth with an 8–1 victory. The Magpies also had a fairly disappointing FA Cup run, being knocked out in a first qualifying round replay by Taunton United.

Despite another good campaign from their prolific forward Billy Kellock, Torquay had a poor end to their third Southern League season and could only manage a lowly 15th-place finish in the Western Section table.

== Competitions ==
=== Southern League Western Section ===
==== Standings ====
Pos	Team	Pld	W	D	L	GF	GA	GR	Pts	Result
13	Taunton United	38	15	6	17	55	51	1.078	36	
14	Bristol Rovers II	38	13	6	19	45	50	0.900	32	
15	Torquay United	38	9	11	18	41	73	0.562	29	
16	Llanelly	38	6	12	20	49	94	0.521	24	Left league at end of season
17	Ebbw Vale	38	9	6	23	40	91	0.440	24	

Rules for classification: The system of using goal average to separate two teams tied on points was used until the 1976–77 season. The points system: 2 points for a win, 1 point for a draw and 0 points for losing.

==== Matches ====
30 Aug 1924	Torquay United	2–1	Bristol Rovers Reserves	Plainmoor
	Bolt; Bell		Goal

6 Sep 1924	Torquay United	1–1	Bridgend Town	Plainmoor
	Bolt		Goal

13 Sep 1924	Yeovil & Petters United	1–2	Torquay United	Pen Mill Athletic Ground
	Goal		Raymond; Miller

26 Sep 1924	Mid Rhondda United	3–0	Torquay United	Mid Rhondda Ground
	Goal

27 Sep 1924	Pontypridd	3–0	Torquay United	Pontypridd
	Goal

11 Oct 1924	Torquay United	3–0	Yeovil & Petters United	Plainmoor
	Kellock; Breen

16 Oct 1924	Swansea Town Reserves	2–0	Torquay United	Vetch Field
	Goal

25 Oct 1924	Bridgend Town	1–0	Torquay United	Brewery Field
	Goal

8 Nov 1924	Torquay United	1–1	Exeter City Reserves	Plainmoor
	(o.g.)		Goal

15 Nov 1924	Bath City	1–1	Torquay United	Belvoir
	Goal		Raymond

22 Nov 1924	Torquay United	2–0	Llanelly	Plainmoor
	Raymond; Stuckey

29 Nov 1924	Plymouth Argyle Reserves	7–0	Torquay United	Home Park
	Goal

6 Dec 1924	Torquay United	1–1	Bath City	Plainmoor
	Goal		Goal

20 Dec 1924	Torquay United	3–1	Newport County Reserves	Plainmoor
	Bolt; Kellock		Goal

25 Dec 1924	Torquay United	2–2	Swindon Town Reserves	Plainmoor
	Miller; Pearson		Goal

27 Dec 1924	Bristol Rovers Reserves	3–1	Torquay United	Eastville Stadium
	Goal		Kellock

3 Jan 1925	Torquay United	4–1	Ebbw Vale	Plainmoor
	Bell; Kellock; Bolt		Goal

17 Jan 1925	Torquay United	1–8	Plymouth Argyle Reserves	Plainmoor
	Bell		Goal

24 Jan 1925	Aberaman Athletic	1–1	Torquay United	Aberaman
	Goal		Bell

31 Jan 1925	Torquay United	2–2	Bristol City Reserves	Plainmoor
	Bell; Bolt (pen.)		Goal

7 Feb 1925	Torquay United	0–1	Swansea Town Reserves	Plainmoor
			Goal

14 Feb 1925	Torquay United	1–1	Barry	Plainmoor
	Pearson		Goal

21 Feb 1925	Ebbw Vale	5–1	Torquay United	Welfare Ground
	Goal		Leslie

27 Feb 1925	Torquay United	2–1	Mid Rhondda United	Plainmoor
	Pearson; Bolt		Goal

28 Feb 1925	Torquay United	1–0	Aberaman Athletic	Plainmoor
	Pearson

7 Mar 1925	Weymouth	1–0	Torquay United	Recreation Ground
	Reilly

11 Mar 1925	Exeter City Reserves	1–1	Torquay United	St James Park
	Goal		Kellock

14 Mar 1925	Torquay United	0–0	Weymouth	Plainmoor

21 Mar 1925	Cardiff City Reserves	3–0	Torquay United	Ninian Park
	Goal

25 Mar 1925	Bristol City Reserves	2–0	Torquay United	Ashton Gate
	Goal

28 Mar 1925	Torquay United	0–2	Pontypridd	Plainmoor
			Goal

4 Apr 1925	Barry	2–2	Torquay United	Jenner Park
	Goal		Pridham; Bell

10 Apr 1925	Swindon Town Reserves	3–0	Torquay United	County Ground
	Goal

11 Apr 1925	Newport County Reserves	2–1	Torquay United	Somerton Park
	Goal		Goal

13 Apr 1925	Torquay United	0–3	Taunton United	Plainmoor
			Goal

14 Apr 1925	Taunton United	2–1	Torquay United	Taunton
	Goal		Bolt

18 Apr 1925	Llanelly	1–3	Torquay United	Stebonheath Park
	Goal		Kellock; Leslie (pen.)

2 May 1925	Torquay United	1–3	Cardiff City Reserves	Plainmoor
	Kellock		Goal

=== FA Cup ===
20 Sep 1924 Preliminary round	Torquay United	2–0	Green Waves	Plainmoor
	Bell; Kellock

4 Oct 1924 First round qualifying	Torquay United	1–1	Taunton United	Plainmoor
	Breen		Goal

9 Oct 1924 First round q. replay	Taunton United	2–1	Torquay United	Taunton
	Goal		Breen

=== Devon Professional Cup ===
11 Feb 1925 Semi Final	Exeter City	7–1	Torquay United	St James Park
	Goal		Kellock
