= 1921–22 Torquay United F.C. season =

Torquay United
1921–22 season
- Chairman: Charles Hore
- Manager: Crad Evans
- Western League: 5th
- FA Cup: Fourth round qualifying
- Devon Senior Cup: Winners
Home colours

The 1921–22 Torquay United F.C. season was Torquay United's first season in competitive football and their first season in the Western League. The season runs from 1 July 1921 to 30 June 1922.

== Overview ==
When Devon's two most successful football clubs Plymouth Argyle and Exeter City became founder members of the Football League Third Division in 1920, questions were asked as to whether Devon's third largest town, Torquay, could support a Football League team of its own. The seaside resort's two foremost sides were Torquay Town and Babbacombe and, while they had both enjoyed success in the Plymouth & District League, it was felt that Torquay's best chance of creating a team strong enough for the Football League would be for the two fierce rivals to merge. Despite many years of friction between the sides, it was finally decided that the 1920–21 football season would be the last for both Torquay Town and Babbacombe and that a new professional football club would be formed.

The new team was to be called Torquay United, which was a name that had previously been used from 1899 up until 1910 before the original United merged with Ellacombe to form Torquay Town. Crad Evans, Torquay Town's star striker, was installed as player-manager and the new team adopted a black and white strip which soon earned them the nickname of 'the Magpies'. Although Torquay United were initially denied entry into the Southern League, they were accepted into the Western League in time for the 1921–22 season.

Despite an encouraging first game of the season, a 1–0 victory over Weymouth, Torquay's form soon dipped and they would not win another League game until the New Year. However, a run of five wins out of six at the end of the season led United to a respectable mid-table finish in a very competitive league. Torquay also enjoyed an extended run in the FA Cup, playing a total of eight fixtures (nine including the 75th minute abandonment of the first qualifying round fixture against Spencer Moulton). United made it as far as the fourth qualifying round before being knocked out by Boscombe. The newly professional Torquay United also made their last appearance in the Devon Senior Cup. It was a tournament the club had won under the name of Torquay Town in 1911 and the re-christened United repeated the feat by beating Oreston Rovers 1–0 in the final at Home Park.

At the end of the season, Torquay United again applied to join the Southern League and, on this occasion, were successful in their bid.

== Competitions ==
=== Western League ===
==== Standings ====
Pos	Team	Pld	W	D	L	GF	GA	GR	Pts	Result
1	Yeovil and Petters United	14	10	2	2	26	9	2.889	22	
2	Trowbridge Town	14	8	1	5	18	15	1.200	17	
3	Welton Rovers	14	7	2	5	31	27	1.148	16	
4	Cardiff Corinthians	14	7	1	6	30	22	1.364	15	
5	Torquay United	14	6	2	6	25	17	1.471	14	Moved to the Southern League English Section
6	Peasedown St John	14	5	3	6	21	19	1.105	13	
7	Weymouth	14	5	1	8	15	25	0.600	11	
8	Horfield United	14	1	2	11	10	42	0.238	4	Left at the end of the season

==== Matches ====
3 Sep 1921	Torquay United	1 – 0	Weymouth	Plainmoor
	Sanders			Attendance: 3,000

17 Sep 1921	Torquay United	1 – 1	Peasedown St John	Plainmoor
	Frayn (pen.)		Goal

29 Oct 1921	Torquay United	1 – 3	Cardiff Corinthians	Plainmoor
	Davis		Goal

31 Dec 1921	Trowbridge Town	2 – 1	Torquay United	Trowbridge
	Goal		Frayn

8 Feb 1922	Welton Rovers	3 – 1	Torquay United	West Clewes
	Goal		Pratt

18 Feb 1922	Torquay United	0 – 1	Yeovil & Petters United	Plainmoor
			Goal

25 Feb 1922	Peasedown St John	2 – 1	Torquay United	Peasedown St John
	Goal		Burley

11 Mar 1922	Horfield United	2 – 2	Torquay United	Horfield
	Goal		Nettesonne Chapman

18 Mar 1922	Torquay United	2 – 1	Welton Rovers	Plainmoor
	Burch; Harris		Goal

5 Apr 1922	Cardiff Corinthians	0 – 6	Torquay United	Pengam Farm
			Burley; Harris; Jackman; Lincoln

8 Apr 1922	Weymouth	0 – 2	Torquay United	Recreation Ground
			Worden Stuckey (pen.)

17 Apr 1922	Torquay United	4 – 0	Trowbridge Town	Plainmoor
	Burch (pen.); Stuckey; Harris

22 Apr 1922	Yeovil & Petters United	2 – 0	Torquay United	Pen Mill Athletic Ground
	Goal

29 Apr 1922	Torquay United	3 – 0	Horfield United	Plainmoor
	Burley; Pratt; Harris

=== FA Cup ===
10 Sep 1921 Extra preliminary round	Minehead	0 – 3	Torquay United	Recreation Ground
			Stuckey (pen.); Townsend

24 Sep 1921 Preliminary round	Torquay United	1 – 1	Frome Town	Plainmoor
	Stuckey		Goal

27 Sep 1921 Pre. Round Replay	Frome Town	1 – 3	Torquay United	Badgers Hill
	Goal		Davis (pen.); Stuckey

12 Oct 1921^{[1]} First round qualifying	Torquay United	5 – 2	Spencer Moulton	Plainmoor
	Stuckey; Lincoln; Burch		Goal

22 Oct 1921 Second round qualifying	Torquay United	6 – 0	St George's	Plainmoor
	Stuckey; Townsend; Burch; Merrick

5 Nov 1921 Third round qualifying	Torquay United	2 – 2	Hanham Athletic	Plainmoor
	Burch (pen.); Evans		Goal

9 Nov 1921 Third round Q. Replay	Hanham Athletic	1 – 3	Torquay United	Hanham
	Goal		Frayn; Evans

19 Nov 1921 Fourth round qualifying	Torquay United	0 – 1	Boscombe	Plainmoor
			Goal

=== Devon Senior Cup ===
3 Dec 1921 First round	Dartmouth United	0 – 3	Torquay United	Long Cross
			Frayn; Townsend

17 Dec 1921 Second round	Torquay United	5 – 0	Chudleigh	Plainmoor
	Townsend; Evans; Pyne; Burch (o.g.)

11 Mar 1922 Quarter Final	Torquay United	6 – 0	Torrington	Plainmoor
	Burch; Stuckey; Lincoln; Harris; Pridham

29 Mar 1922 Semi Final	Teign Village	0 – 7	Torquay United	Newton Abbot
			Stuckey (pen.); Nattesonne; Martin; Evans (o.g.)

8 Apr 1922 Final	Oreston Rovers	0 – 1	Torquay United	Home Park
			Frayn

== Notes ==
^{1} . Match originally played 8 Oct 1921 but was abandoned after 75 minutes due to fog. Torquay United were leading 2–0 at the time.
