= 1923–24 Torquay United F.C. season =

Torquay United
1923–24 season
- Chairman: George Perry
- Manager: Crad Evans
- Southern League Western Section: 4th
- FA Cup: Fourth round qualifying
- Devon Professional Cup: Semi-final
- Top goalscorer: League: Billy Kellock (13); All: Billy Kellock (23)
Home colours

The 1923–24 Torquay United F.C. season was Torquay United's third season in competitive football and their second season in the Southern League. The season runs from 1 July 1923 to 30 June 1924.

== Overview ==
Torquay's second season in the Southern League saw them transferred to the newly created Western Section. Although consisting of the same mix of professional and reserve sides as the old English Section, the new league now entailed several trips into Wales. United improved upon a satisfying first season in the Southern League by ending the season in 4th place, with the most notable performance of the campaign being an 8–0 thrashing of the Swindon Town Reserves on Boxing Day. The Magpies also had a busy FA Cup schedule, playing eight fixtures in all before finally being knocked out in a fourth qualifying round replay with Third Division South side Aberdare Athletic.

Much of United's success this season was due to some exciting new attacking players. Helping himself to 23 goals in all competitions was former Plymouth Argyle inside forward Billy Kellock, while Cornish centre forward Percy Varco scored six goals before being signed by First Division club Aston Villa for a £200 fee.

Despite an impressive season, Torquay did not attempt to seek election to the Football League this year, deciding instead to focus their efforts on another successful season in the Southern League.

== Competitions ==
=== Southern League Western Section ===
==== Standings ====
Pos	Team	Pld	W	D	L	GF	GA	GR	Pts	Qualification (Note: Number of goals for and/or against is inaccurate.)
2	Plymouth Argyle II	34	21	5	8	74	37	2.000	47	
3	Pontypridd	34	19	8	7	81	44	1.841	46	
4	Torquay United	34	19	7	8	59	25	2.360	45	
5	Bristol City II	34	17	9	8	63	39	1.615	43	
6	Swansea Town II	34	19	5	10	62	38	1.632	43	

Rules for classification: The system of using goal average to separate two teams tied on points was used up until the 1976–77 season. The points system: 2 points for a win, 1 point for a draw and 0 points for losing.

==== Matches ====
25 Aug 1923	Torquay United	1–1	Cardiff City Reserves	Plainmoor
	Rodgerson		Goal

1 Sep 1923	Swansea Town Reserves	1–0	Torquay United	Vetch Field
	Goal

15 Sep 1923	Torquay United	3–1	Pontypridd	Plainmoor
	Kellock; Pearson; Burton		Goal

29 Sep 1923	Weymouth	1–0	Torquay United	Recreation Ground
	Bell			Attendance: 1,852

13 Oct 1923	Torquay United	5–0	Barry	Plainmoor
	Jackson; Kellock; Rodgerson

27 Oct 1923	Barry	0–1	Torquay United	Jenner Park
			Pearson

10 Nov 1923	Newport County Reserves	3–3	Torquay United	Somerton Park
	Goal		Varco; Burton

24 Nov 1923	Torquay United	3–1	Newport County Reserves	Plainmoor
	Rodgerson; Kellock		Goal

1 Dec 1923	Bridgend Town	2–2	Torquay United	Brewery Field
	Goal		(o.g.); Varco

8 Dec 1923	Torquay United	4–0	Bridgend Town	Plainmoor
	(o.g.); Pearson; Kellock; Burton

15 Dec 1923	Torquay United	3–2	Bristol Rovers Reserves	Plainmoor
	Varco		Goal

26 Dec 1923	Torquay United	8–0	Swindon Town Reserves	Plainmoor
	Miller; Burton; Babbage; Kellock

29 Dec 1923	Torquay United	3–0	Plymouth Argyle Reserves	Plainmoor
	Miller; Burton; Kellock

5 Jan 1924	Torquay United	2–0	Bath City	Plainmoor
	Fretwell-Hall; Kellock

19 Jan 1924	Cardiff City Reserves	0–1	Torquay United	Ninian Park
			Pearson

2 Feb 1924	Llanelly	2–0	Torquay United	Stebonheath Park
	Goal

4 Feb 1924	Pontypridd	2–0	Torquay United	Pontypridd
	Goal

9 Feb 1924	Torquay United	5–0	Aberaman Athletic	Plainmoor
	Kellock; Rodgerson; Scott

16 Feb 1924	Torquay United	1–0	Swansea Town Reserves	Plainmoor
	Scott

20 Feb 1924	Torquay United	1–0	Llanelly	Plainmoor
	Scott

23 Feb 1924	Yeovil & Petters United	3–2	Torquay United	Pen Mill Athletic Ground
	Goal		Miller; Scott

1 Mar 1924	Torquay United	0–0	Bristol City Reserves	Plainmoor

15 Mar 1924	Bristol City Reserves	1–0	Torquay United	Ashton Gate
	Goal

22 Mar 1924	Bristol Rovers Reserves	2–0	Torquay United	Eastville Stadium
	Goal

28 Mar 1924	Aberaman Athletic	0–2	Torquay United	Aberaman
			Miller; Rodgerson

29 Mar 1924	Ebbw Vale	0–1	Torquay United	Welfare Ground
			Babbage

5 Apr 1924	Torquay United	2–0	Ebbw Vale	Plainmoor
	Kellock; Pearson

12 Apr 1924	Torquay United	1–0	Weymouth	Plainmoor
	Kellock

18 Apr 1924	Swindon Town Reserves	0–2	Torquay United	County Ground
			Burton; Scott

19 Apr 1924	Exeter City Reserves	1–2	Torquay United	St James Park
	Goal		Scott

21 Apr 1924	Torquay United	1–1	Exeter City Reserves	Plainmoor
	Scott		Goal

26 Apr 1924	Plymouth Argyle Reserves	1–0	Torquay United	Home Park
	Goal

29 Apr 1924	Torquay United	0–0	Yeovil & Petters United	Plainmoor

3 May 1924	Bath City	0–0	Torquay United	Belvoir

=== FA Cup ===
8 Sep 1923 Extra preliminary round	Newtons & Taunton	0–3	Torquay United	Taunton
			Rodgerson; Kellock; Fretwell-Hall

22 Sep 1923 Preliminary round	Green Waves	0–3	Torquay United	Plymouth
			Miller; Pearson; Kellock

6 Oct 1923 First round qualifying	Torquay United	6–0	Coleford Athletic	Plainmoor
	Kellock; Townsend

20 Oct 1923 Second round qualifying	Torquay United	3–0	Trowbridge Town	Plainmoor
	Kellock

3 Nov 1923 Third round qualifying	Yeovil & Petters United	1–1	Torquay United	Pen Mill Athletic Ground
	Goal		Pearson

7 Nov 1923 Third round q. replay	Torquay United	2–1	Yeovil & Petters United	Plainmoor
	Kellock; Miller (pen.)		Goal

17 Nov 1923 Fourth round qualifying	Torquay United	0–0	Aberdare Athletic	Plainmoor

22 Nov 1923 Fourth round q. replay	Aberdare Athletic	4–0	Torquay United	Aberdare Athletic Ground
	Goal

=== Devon Professional Cup ===
26 Sep 1923 Semi Final	Torquay United	0–1	Exeter City XI	Plainmoor
			Goal
