= Devon Senior Cup =

- Organising body: Devon County FA
- Founded: 1890; 135 years ago
- Region: Devon
- Current champions: Newton Abbot Spurs reserves (4th title)
- Most successful club(s): Plymouth Argyle (Note: including reserve team.) (6 titles)

The Devon Senior Cup or MJ Evans & Co Accountants Devon Senior Cup for sponsorship reasons is the third tier county cup in the county of Devon. It is administered by the Devon County Football Association. It is open to all teams affiliated to the County FA.

The finals were played at either Home Park, Plymouth or St James Park, Exeter until the 1950s. Plymouth Argyle and Torquay United's first team has won the competition in 1903 and 1922 respectively.

== History ==
Originally the county cup competition for the Devon County F.A., it has been superseded in importance by the Premier Cup and St Luke's Challenge Cup. The St Luke's Challenge Cup is open to affiliated teams of the Football League and steps 1-6 Leagues affiliated to Devon County F.A. Clubs may enter one team per cup competition only. The Premier and Senior Cup competitions are open to all affiliated teams of the Devon County F.A.

After 1970 the introduction of the Devon F.A. Premier Cup and the initial restriction to senior teams (i.e. no reserves initially), meant that those clubs higher up the English League pyramid no longer entered.

== Finals ==
| * | League format |
| † | Match went to extra time |
| ‡ | Match decided by a penalty shootout after extra time |
| # | Shared trophy |

19th Century
| Season | Winners (No.) | Result | Runner-up |
|---|---|---|---|
| 1889–90 | Tavistock (1) | 1–0 | Plymouth Town |
| 1890–91 | St. James the Less (1) | 2–1 | Plymouth United |
| 1891–92 | Plymouth (1) | – (Note: Plymouth 12 pts, Plymouth United 8 pts, St. James the Less 7 pts, Argyle 5 pts, Brunswick 2 pts.) | Plymouth United |
| 1892–93 | 7th CO WD Royal Artillery (1) | 2–0 | Bedford Regiment |
| 1893–94 | 7th CO WD Royal Artillery (2) | 3–1 | 2nd Battalion Devonshire Regiment |
| 1894–95 | 2nd Battalion Devonshire Regiment (1) | 2–1 | Somerset Light Infantry |
| 1895–96 | 1st Battalion Welch Regiment (1) | 2–0 | Royal Berkshire Regiment |
| 1896–97 | 2nd Battalion King's Own Royal Lancaster Regiment (1) | 3–0 | Gloucestershire Regiment |
| 1897–98 | 15th CO WD Royal Artillery (1) | 2–1 | Exeter United |
| 1898–99 | 1st Battalion Welch Regiment (2) | 2–1 | Argyle |
20th Century Pre-World War I
| Season | Winners (No.) | Result | Runner-up |
| 1899–1900 | Torpoint Athletic (1) | 1–0 | Argyle |
| 1900–01 | Devonport Royal Artillery (1) | 2–1 | Tavistock |
| 1901–02 | Greenwaves (1) | 3–0 | Argyle |
| 1902–03 | Argyle (1) | 3–0 | Tavistock |
| 1903–04 | Laira (1) | 2–0 | 1st Royal North Lancaster Regiment |
| 1904–05 | Greenwaves (2) | 2–0 | Duke of Cornwall's Light Infantry |
| 1905–06 | Plymouth Argyle reserves (2) | 8–1 | Oreston Rovers |
| 1906–07 | Plymouth Argyle reserves (3) | 1–0 | Royal Marines |
| 1907–08 | Plymouth Argyle reserves (4) | 2–1 | 3rd Rifles Brigade |
| 1908–09 | Royal Naval Barracks Devonport (1) | 3–2 | Plymouth Argyle |
| 1909–10 | 1st Battalion South Staffordshire Regiment (1) | 2–1 | Royal Garrison Artillery |
| 1910–11 | Torquay Town (1) | 2–0 | Royal Garrison Artillery |
| 1911–12 | Plymouth Argyle reserves (5) | 3–0 | Torquay Town |
| 1912–13 | Plymouth Argyle reserves (6) | 2–1 | Exeter City reserves |
| 1913–14 | Millbrook Rangers (1) | 1–0 | Plymouth Argyle reserves |
20th Century Post-World War I/Pre-World War II
| Season | Winners (No.) | Result | Runner-up |
| 1919–20 | No.3 Depot Royal Garrison Artillery (1) | 2–1 | Argyle |
| 1920–21 | Greenwaves (3) | 2–0 | Oreston Rovers |
| 1921–22 | Torquay United (1) | 1–0 | Oreston Rovers |
| 1922–23 | Plymouth St. Thomas (1) | 2–0 | Torquay United reserves |
| 1923–24 | Oreston Rovers (1) | 1–0 | Millbrook Rangers |
| 1924–25 | Oreston Rovers (2) | 4–1 | Friernhay |
| 1925–26 | Friernhay (1) | 2–1 | Royal Naval Barracks Devonport |
| 1926–27 | Royal Naval Barracks Devonport (2) | 3–1 | Tavistock |
| 1927–28 | Dartmouth United (1) | 3–2 | 2nd Hampshire Regiment |
| 1928–29 | Civil Service Plymouth (1) | 1–0 | Ilfracombe Town |
| 1929–30 | Greenwaves (4) | 2–0 | Ilfracombe Town |
| 1930–31 | Royal Marines (1) | 4–1 | Dartmouth United |
| 1931–32 | Royal Naval Barracks Devonport (3) | 5–2 | Devon General Exeter |
| 1932–33 | Devon General Exeter (1) | 2–1 | Dartmouth United |
| 1933–34 | Royal Naval Barracks Devonport (4) | 5–1 | Ilfracombe Town |
| 1934–35 | Friernhay (2) | 1–0 | Bideford United |
| 1935–36 | Friernhay (3) | 2–0 | Plymouth Civil Service |
| 1936–37 | Plymouth & Stoneouse Gas (1) | 3–0 | Bideford United |
| 1937–38 | Royal Naval Torpedos (1) | 2–1 | Friernhay |
| 1938–39 | Plymouth & Stoneouse Gas (2) | 4–0 | Dartmouth United |
| 1939–40 | Plymouth & Stoneouse Gas (3) | 2–1 | Ilfracombe Town |
20th Century Post-World War II
| Season | Winners (No.) | Result | Runner-up |
| 1945–46 | Plymouth United (1) | N/A | Royal Marines (1) |
| 1946–47 | Torquay United reserves (2) | 2–1 | Royal Naval Barracks Devonport |
| 1947–48 | Heavitree United (1) | 3–1 | Newton Abbot Spurs |
| 1948–49 | Dartmouth United (2) | 3–1 | Barnstaple Town |
| 1949–50 | Newton Abbot Spurs (1) | 3–1 | Tamerton |
| 1950–51 | Exmouth Town (1) | 1–1 † | Newton Abbot Spurs (1) |
| 1951–52 | Clyst Valley (1) | 4–2 | Callington |
| 1952–53 | Royal Naval Barracks Devonport (5) | 3–2 | Dartmouth United |
| 1953–54 | Holsworthy (1) | 3–2 | Dartmouth United |
| 1954–55 | Dartmouth United (3) | 5–1 | Friernhay |
| 1955–56 | Tiverton Town (3) | 3–2 | Tavistock |
| 1956–57 | Chelston (1) | 2–2 † | Plymouth United (2) |
| 1957–58 | Dawlish Town (1) | 4–3 | Dartmouth United |
| 1958–59 | Brixham United (1) | 5–1 | Tiverton Town |
| 1959–60 | Torquay United "A" (3) | 7–2 | Ottery St Mary |
| 1960–61 | Heavitree United (2) | 3–0 | Plymouth United |
| 1961–62 | Brixham United (2) | 1–0 | Cullompton Rangers |
| 1962–63 | Woodlands (1) | 3–0 | Newton Abbot Spurs |
| 1963–64 | Torquay United "A" (4) | 2–1 | Dawlish Town |
| 1964–65 | Portals Athletic (1) | 4–0 | Kingsteignton |
| 1965–66 | Tiverton Town (4) | 2–2 † | Upton Athletic (1) |
| 1966–67 | St Luke's College (1) | 4–3 | Dawlish Town |
| 1967–68 | Dawlish Town (2) | 3–1 | Holsworthy |
| 1968–69 | Tavistock (2) | 4–3 | Holsworthy |
| 1969–70 | Plymouth City (1) | 1–0 | Galmpton United |
| 1970–71 | Horrabridge United (1) | 2–0 | Millbridge |
| 1971–72 | Dolphin United (1) | 3–2 | Glampton United |
| 1972–73 | Brown & Sharpe (1) | 4–0 | Bideford |
| 1973–74 | Fawn United Plymouth (1) | 5–2 | Seaton Town |
| 1974–75 | Newton St Cyres (1) | 6–0 | BRSA Nomads (Plymouth) |
| 1975–76 | Bull Point (1) | 3–1 | Crownhill RBL |
| 1976–77 | Elmore (1) | 2–1 | Bideford AAC |
| 1977–78 | Tavistock United (1) | 5–1 | Topsham Town |
| 1978–79 | Sams United (1) | 4–2 | Dept. of Environment |
| 1979–80 | Bideford Center (1) | 2–1 | Fawn United |
| 1980–81 | Clyst Valley (2) | 6–1 | Ipplepen Athletic |
| 1981–82 | Tavistock (3) | 6–1 | Ipplepen Athletic |
| 1982–83 | Weston Mill Oak Villa reserves (1) | 5–1 | Greenbank |
| 1983–84 | Exeter Arms (1) | 2–1 | Appledore BAAC reserves |
| 1984–85 | Chelston (2) | 3–1 | City Engineers |
| 1985–86 | Willand Rovers (1) | 1–0 | Liverton United |
| 1986–87 | Varley Trophies (1) | 2–1 | Offwell Rangers |
| 1987–88 | Ottery St Mary (1) | 2–1 | Elmore reserves |
| 1988–89 | Exeter City Service (1) | 1–0 | Plymstock |
| 1989–90 | Buckfastleigh (1) | 3–0 | Ambrosia |
| 1990–91 | Newton Abbot Spurs (2) | 2–0 | Newton Abbot |
| 1991–92 | St Martins (1) | 1–0 | Falstaff Wanderers |
| 1992–93 | Barnstaple Town (1) | 2–0 | Vosper Oak Villa |
| 1993–94 | Cheriton Fitzpaine (1) | 3–1 | Barnstaple Town reserves |
| 1994–95 | Watts Blake Bearne (1) | 3–2 | Newton Abbot 66 |
| 1995–96 | Hooe St John (1) | 2–1 | Watts Blake Bearne |
| 1996–97 | Budleigh Salterton (1) | 6–2 | Watts Blake Bearne |
| 1997–98 | Combined 89 (1) | 5–1 | Hatherleigh Town |
| 1998–99 | Thorverton (1) | 2–1 | Elmore reserves |
21st Century
| Season | Winners (No.) | Result | Runner-up |
| 1999–2000 | Newton Abbot (1) | 2–1 | Barnstaple Town reserves |
| 2000–01 | Bideford reserves (1) | 6–1 | Compton Inn |
| 2001–02 | Barnstaple AAC (1) | 2–2 † ‡ | Willand Rovers |
| 2002–03 | Buckland Athletic reserves (1) | 3–2 | Princess Yachts International |
| 2003–04 | Heavitree Harriers (1) | 3–3 † ‡ | Morley Cars |
| 2004–05 | Kentisbeare (1) | 3–2 | Newton Abbot |
| 2005–06 | Upton Athletic reserves (1) | 1–0 | Bere Alston |
| 2006–07 | Combe Martin (1) | 3–1 | Lamerton |
| 2007–08 | Willand Rovers reserves (1) | 2–0 | Broadclyst |
| 2008–09 | Buckland Athletic reserves (2) | 1–0 | Lifton |
| 2009–10 | Buckland Athletic reserves (3) | 4–2 | Elburton Villa |
| 2010–11 | Loddiswell United (1) | 3–2 | Barnstaple |
| 2011–12 | Bow AAC (1) | 1–0 | Lee Moor |
| 2012–13 | Tiverton Town reserves (5) | 3–0 | Windmill |
| 2013–14 | Dartmouth (4) | 4–2 | Exwick Villa reserves |
| 2014–15 | Exwick Villa reserves (1) | 4–2 | Lapford |
| 2015–16 | University of Exeter reserves (1) | 4–2 | Lapford |
| 2016–17 | Cronies (1) | 3–0 | Roseland |
| 2017–18 | Sidmouth Town reserves (1) | 2–0 | Colyton |
| 2018–19 | Windwill reserves (1) | 2–2 (4–2 p.) † ‡ | Kentisbeare |
| 2019–20 | Thorverton (2) | 2–1 | Millbridge United |
| 2020–21 | Ottery St Mary reserves (2) | 4–1 | Northam Lions |
| 2021–22 | Kingsteignton Athletic (1) | 3–0 | Chudleigh Athletic |
| 2022–23 | University of Exeter reserves (2) | 3–0 | Newton St Cyres |
| 2023–24 | Newton Abbot Spurs reserves (4) | 3–1 | Paignton Saints |

== Last 10 finals ==
| 30 April 2015 | Exwick Villa res. | 4–2 | Lapford | Newton Abbot |
| 19:00 BST | | Report | | Stadium: Coach Road; Referee: Lee Johnson |

| 28 April 2016 | Lapford | 2–4 | University of Exeter res. | Newton Abbot |
| 19:15 BST | | Report | | Stadium: Coach Road; Referee: Martin Lewis |

| 20 April 2017 | Roselands | 0–3 | Cronies | Newton Abbot |
| 19:15 BST | | Report | Fanson 52', 57'; Lawrence 60' | Stadium: Coach Road |

| 19 April 2018 | Colyton | 0–2 | Sidmouth Town res. | Newton Abbot |
| 19:15 BST | | Report | Ferenc Bodor 32'; Scott Hughes | Stadium: Coach Road; Referee: Timothy Platt |

| 18 April 2019 | Kentisbeare | 2–2 (a.e.t.) (2–4 p) | The Windmill res. | Newton Abbot |
| 19:15 BST | Searle 55'; Hawkins 84' | Report | Bignell 66'; Presland 90' | Stadium: Coach Road |

| 4 September 2020 | Thorverton | 2–1 | Millbridge United | Newton Abbot |
| 19:00 BST | Chris Powell | Report | | Stadium: Coach Road |

| 21 June 2021 | Ottery St Mary reserves | 4–1 | Northam Lions | Newton Abbot |
| 14:00 BST | | Report | Tony Cox; Matthhew Webb | Stadium: Coach Road |

| 26 May 2022 | Kingsteignton Athletic | 3–0 | Chudleigh Athletic | Newton Abbot |
| 14:00 BST | | Report | | Stadium: Coach Road |

| 20 May 2023 | Newton St Cyres | 0–3 | University of Exeter res. | Newton Abbot |
| 14:30 BST | | | | Stadium: Coach Road |

| 18 May 2024 | Paignton Saints | 1–3 | Newton Abbot Spurs res. | Newton Abbot |
| 14:00 BST | Jake Powell | Report | Ollie Critchlow; Kye Drinkwater | Stadium: Coach Road |
