= Scott Kaasikmae =

English footballer

Scot Kaasikmae
Personal information
- Full name: Scot Kaasikmae
- Date of birth: 14 December 1977 (age 48)
- Place of birth: Wolverhampton, England
- Position: Forward

Youth career
- Torquay United

Senior career*
Years	Team	Apps	(Gls)
1995–1996	Torquay United	0	(0)
1996–1997	Dawlish Town		
1997–1998	Newton Abbot		
1998	Teignmouth		
1998–1999	Taunton Town		
1999–?	Bideford		
?–2000	Combined 89		
2000	Taunton Town		
2000–2001	Dartmouth		
2001	Dawlish Town		
2001	Dartmouth		
2001–?	Buckfastleigh Rangers		
- Dartmouth
20??–2008	Stoke Gabriel		
2008–?	Bovey Tracey		
- * Club domestic league appearances and goals

Scot Kaasikmae (born 14 December 1977) is an English footballer who played as a midfielder, making one first team appearance for Torquay United.

== Career ==
Kaasikmae began his career as an apprentice with Torquay United. Despite making his first team debut while still an apprentice, playing in the 5–2 defeat away to Colchester United in the 1st round of the Football League Trophy on 26 September 1995, he was released at the end of his apprenticeship, joining Dawlish Town.

In July 1997 he was a triallist with Taunton Town, but later joined Newton Abbot, leaving them in the 1998 close season to join Teignmouth. However, by August 1998 he had joined Taunton Town, but was released the following January and joined Western League rivals Bideford, managed by Sean Joyce. In March 2000 he was playing for South Devon League side Combined 89. He re-joined Taunton Town in the summer of 2000, but by August 2000 was playing for Dartmouth, alongside another former Torquay apprentice Jamie Bennellick. He left Dartmouth in the 2001 close-season to rejoin Dawlish Town, playing in the home friendly against Huddersfield Town that July. However, his stay at Dawlish was short-lived as he was released in late October after failing to show up for a game. He rejoined Dartmouth, but in early November 2001 moved on to Buckfastleigh Rangers.

In the 2005–06 season he was playing once more for Dartmouth. In the 2007–08 season, he was playing for Stoke Gabriel.

He joined Bovey Tracey in the 2008 close season, scoring on his debut.
