= Devon County Football Association =

Area sporting organization with 19th century origins

- Devon County FA logo
- Purpose: Football association
- Location: Coach Road, Newton Abbot
- Coordinates: 50.522472°N 3.6064875°W
- Chairman: John Street
- Website: www.devonfa.com

The Devon County Football Association, also simply known as the Devon F.A., is the governing body of football in the county of Devon. The Devon F.A. was founded in 1888 in Plymouth.

They run a number of league and cup competitions for teams of all levels across the county, and representative teams for Senior Ladies, Under 18 Men and Under 18 Ladies.

== History ==
The Devon County Football Association was formed in 1888 at a meeting held in the pavilion of Plymouth Cricket Club, South Devon Place, which is now the Astor Playing Fields at Cattedown. The founding clubs were:

- Newton
- Argyle FC
- Carlton Oaks
- Plymouth F.C.
- Plymouth United
- Plymouth College
- Mannamead School
- Tavistock Grammar School

Initially the County F.A. established a set of rules for members and oversaw friendlies and inter county representative matches. The first County Representative match took place in March 1888 at Weston-super-Mare against Somerset County F.A. where they were defeated by two goals to nil. The return fixture in April also ended in a defeat by two goals to three. In 1889, the County Cup competition, the Challenge Cup, was inaugurated. The first winners were Tavistock Town who defeated Plymouth FC in the final.

== Leagues ==
Devon is one of the largest County F.A.'s by geographic area. There are five affiliated Saturday men's leagues, one Women's league, four Sunday leagues and a Wednesday league. They are:

Saturday

- Devon Football League
- Plymouth and West Devon Combination Football League
- South Devon League
- North Devon League
- Devon and Exeter League

Women's

- Devon Women's League

Sunday

- Exeter and District Sunday League
- Torbay Sunday League
- North Devon Sunday League
- Plymouth and West Devon Sunday League
- Devon Wednesday League

Additionally there are 8 Junior Boy's leagues and one Girl's league. Affiliated clubs also play in other Football Association and Football League competitions. These include the three senior clubs that play in Football League Two (as of 2013) of Plymouth Argyle, Exeter City and Torquay United.

== County Cups ==
The St Luke's Challenge Cup is the premier male county knockout cup competition with the newly formed (2025) Women's Challenge Cup the women's. The full list is:

- St Luke's Challenge Cup
- Women's Challenge Cup
- Devon Premier Cup
- Devon Women's Premier Cup
- Devon Senior Cup
- Devon Women's Senior Cup
- Devon Intermediate Cup
- Devon Veterans Cup
- Devon Midweek Cup
- Devon Sunday Supplementary Cup
- Devon Sunday Senior Cup
- Devon Under 12 Youth Cup
- Devon Under 13 Youth Cup
- Devon Under 14 Youth Cup
- Devon Under 15 Youth Cup
- Devon Under 16 Youth Cup
- Devon Under 18 Youth Cup
- Devon Under 13 Girls Cup
- Devon Under 15 Girls Cup
- Devon Under 16 Girls Cup
- Devon Walking Football Cup

== Clubs ==
Over 500 clubs are affiliated with Devon County Football Association, with many notable clubs being involved in The Football Association National League System.

Men's

- Axminster Town A.F.C
- Barnstaple Town F.C.
- Bideford A.F.C.
- Brixham A.F.C.
- Buckland Athletic F.C.
- Bovey Tracey A.F.C.
- Crediton United A.F.C.
- Cullompton Rangers F.C.
- Elburton Villa F.C.
- Exeter City F.C.
- Exmouth Town F.C.
- Holsworthy A.F.C.
- Honiton Town F.C.
- Ilfracombe Town A.F.C.
- Ivybridge Town F.C.
- Newton Abbot Spurs A.F.C.
- Okehampton Argyle F.C.
- Plymouth Argyle F.C.
- Plymouth Parkway F.C.
- Sidmouth Town A.F.C.
- Stoke Gabriel & Torbay Police F.C.
- Tavistock A.F.C.
- Tiverton Town F.C.
- Torquay United F.C.
- Willand Rovers F.C.

Women's

- Appledore Women F.C
- Exeter City Women F.C.
- Feniton Women F.C
- Honiton Town Women F.C
- Marine Academy Plymouth Ladies F.C
- Plymouth Argyle W.F.C.
- Plympton Ladies F.C
- Torquay United Women F.C

== Notable former players ==
- Ollie Watkins
- Sam Gallagher
- Katie Robinson
- Kieffer Moore
- George Friend
- Trevor Francis
- Ethan Ampadu
- Dan Gosling
- Cliff Bastin
