= Jamie Bennellick =

English footballer (born 1974)

Personal information
- Full name: James Arthur Bennellick
- Date of birth: 9 September 1974 (age 52)
- Place of birth: Torquay, England
- Position: Midfielder

Youth career
- Torquay United

Senior career*
Years	Team	Apps	(Gls)
1992–199x	Torquay United	1	(0)
199x–1995	Liskeard Athletic		
1995–199x	Crediton United		
199x–1998	Dartmouth United		
1998–2000	Elmore		
2002–2004	Dartmouth A.F.C.		
2004–2005	Launceston		
2005–2010	Dartmouth A.F.C.		

Managerial career
- 2005–2010: Dartmouth A.F.C.
- * Club domestic league appearances and goals

James Arthur Bennellick (born 9 September 1974) is an English former professional footballer who played in the Football League for Torquay United.

In 1989, Bennellick was selected for England schoolboys under-15s.

Bennellick, a midfielder, joined Torquay United as a trainee, and made his Football League debut on 4 April 1992, playing as a substitute at Plainmoor against Stockport County. After leaving Torquay, he played non-league football with Liskeard Athletic, Crediton United, Dartmouth United, Elmore, Dartmouth A.F.C., and Launceston. In late 2005, Bennellick was appointed player-manager of Dartmouth, alongside Lance Worthington. He held the post until May 2010.
