= William Burley =

William Burley may refer to:

- William Burley (politician)
- William Burley (priest)
- William Burley (footballer)
- W. J. Burley (William John Burley), British crime writer
