= 1922–23 Torquay United F.C. season =

Torquay United
1922–23 season
- Chairman: George Perry
- Manager: Crad Evans
- Southern League English Section: 6th
- FA Cup: First round qualifying
- Devon Professional Cup: Runners-up
Home colours

The 1922–23 Torquay United F.C. season was Torquay United's second season in competitive football and their first season in the Southern League. The season runs from 1 July 1922 to 30 June 1923.

== Overview ==
After a creditable first season of competitive football in the Western League, Torquay United applied a second time to enter the Southern League and were this time successful. Naturally entering the English Section, the League consisted mainly of reserve teams from Football League sides, as well as a handful of other professional clubs such as Boscombe and their old Western League rivals Yeovil & Petters United. Although Torquay made an inconsistent start to life in the Southern League, they soon picked up the pace as the season wore on. Finishing strongly and losing just one of their last ten games, United ended the season in a respectable 6th place.

As the second highest placed non-reserve side, Torquay United now felt confident enough to apply for election to the Football League. However, United's bid was unsuccessful and the club did not even receive a single vote in the ballot. Having failed in their attempt at election to the Third Division South, Torquay would have to settle for a second season in the Southern League although, due to restructuring, they would now be taking their place in the newly created Western Section.

== Competitions ==
=== Southern League English Section ===
==== Standings ====
| Pos | Team | Pld | W | D | L | GF | GA | GR | Pts | Qualification |
|---|---|---|---|---|---|---|---|---|---|---|
| 4 | Bristol Rovers II | 38 | 20 | 8 | 10 | 59 | 41 | 1.439 | 48 | Transferred to Western Division |
| 5 | Plymouth Argyle II | 38 | 20 | 7 | 11 | 74 | 41 | 1.805 | 47 | Transferred to Western Division |
| 6 | Torquay United | 38 | 18 | 8 | 12 | 63 | 38 | 1.658 | 44 | Transferred to Western Division |
| 7 | Brighton & Hove Albion II | 38 | 20 | 3 | 15 | 95 | 60 | 1.583 | 43 | Transferred to Eastern Division |
| 8 | Luton Town II | 38 | 16 | 11 | 11 | 67 | 56 | 1.196 | 43 | Transferred to Eastern Division |

Rules for classification: The system of using goal average to separate two clubs tied on points was used up until the 1976–77 season. The points system: 2 points for a win, 1 point for a draw and 0 points for losing.

==== Matches ====
| 26 Aug 1922 | Torquay United | 0–1 | Boscombe | Plainmoor |
| | | | Goal |

| 30 Aug 1922 | Luton Town Reserves | 2–3 | Torquay United | Kenilworth Road |
| | Goal | | B. Preston; Miller |

| 2 Sep 1922 | Torquay United | 3–0 | Watford Reserves | Plainmoor |
| | H. Preston; Burley; Thompson |

| 6 Sep 1922 | Torquay United | 0–1 | Portsmouth Reserves | Plainmoor |
| | | | Goal |

| 16 Sep 1922 | Bristol City Reserves | 1–0 | Torquay United | Ashton Gate |
| | Goal |

| 18 Sep 1922 | Plymouth Argyle Reserves | 1–2 | Torquay United | Home Park |
| | Goal | | Burley; B. Preston |

| 20 Sep 1922 | Watford Reserves | 2–0 | Torquay United | Vicarage Road |
| | Goal |

| 23 Sep 1922 | Torquay United | 0–1 | Bristol Rovers Reserves | Plainmoor |
| | | | Goal |

| 30 Sep 1922 | Torquay United | 6–1 | Bath City | Plainmoor |
| | Hill; Burch; Miller; Thompson | | Goal |

| 14 Oct 1922 | Brighton & Hove Albion Reserves | 1–2 | Torquay United | Goldstone Ground |
| | Goal | | Reilly; Thompson |

| 28 Oct 1922 | Guildford United | 1–2 | Torquay United | Josephs Road |
| | Goal | | Thompson |

| 18 Nov 1922 | Norwich City Reserves | 1–0 | Torquay United | The Nest |
| | Goal |

| 25 Nov 1922 | Torquay United | 3–1 | Norwich City Reserves | Plainmoor |
| | Miller; Hill | | Goal |

| 2 Dec 1922 | Swindon Town Reserves | 1–0 | Torquay United | County Ground |
| | Goal |

| 9 Dec 1922 | Torquay United | 2–1 | Swindon Town Reserves | Plainmoor |
| | H. Preston; Hill | | Goal |

| 16 Dec 1922 | Exeter City Reserves | 0–0 | Torquay United | St James Park |

| 23 Dec 1922 | Coventry City Reserves | 3–3 | Torquay United | Highfield Road |
| | Goal | | Hill; Burley |

| 30 Dec 1922 | Torquay United | 3–0 | Plymouth Argyle Reserves | Plainmoor |
| | Goal |

| 6 Jan 1923 | Torquay United | 4–0 | Brighton & Hove Albion Reserves | Plainmoor |
| | Goal |

| 13 Jan 1923 | Torquay United | 1–1 | Luton Town Reserves | Plainmoor |
| | Goal | | Goal |

| 20 Jan 1923 | Portsmouth Reserves | 1–0 | Torquay United | Fratton Park |
| | Goal |

| 27 Jan 1923 | Bristol Rovers Reserves | 2–2 | Torquay United | Eastville Stadium |
| | Goal | | Goal |

| 7 Feb 1923 | Torquay United | 1–0 | Millwall Reserves | Plainmoor |
| | Goal |

| 10 Feb 1923 | Torquay United | 4–0 | Exeter City Reserves | Plainmoor |
| | Goal |

| 17 Feb 1923 | Southend United Reserves | 1–0 | Torquay United | The Kursaal |
| | Goal |

| 24 Feb 1923 | Torquay United | 4–1 | Yeovil & Petters United | Plainmoor |
| | Goal | | Goal |

| 26 Feb 1923 | Millwall Reserves | 1–0 | Torquay United | The Den |
| | Goal |

| 3 Mar 1923 | Yeovil & Petters United | 4–3 | Torquay United | Pen Mill Athletic Ground |
| | Goal | | Goal |

| 17 Mar 1923 | Torquay United | 4–0 | Reading Reserves | Plainmoor |
| | Goal |

| 24 Mar 1923 | Reading Reserves | 0–2 | Torquay United | Elm Park |
| | | | Goal |

| 31 Mar 1923 | Torquay United | 2–1 | Bristol City Reserves | Plainmoor |
| | Goal | | Goal |

| 2 Apr 1923 | Torquay United | 0–0 | Southend United Reserves | Plainmoor |

| 7 Apr 1923 | Boscombe | 0–0 | Torquay United | Dean Court |

| 14 Apr 1923 | Torquay United | 3–1 | Coventry City Reserves | Plainmoor |
| | Goal | | Goal |

| 20 Apr 1923 | Torquay United | 2–2 | Guildford United | Plainmoor |
| | Goal | | Goal |

| 21 Apr 1923 | Southampton Reserves | 3–0 | Torquay United | The Dell |
| | Goal |

| 28 Apr 1923 | Torquay United | 1–0 | Southampton Reserves | Plainmoor |
| | Goal |

| 3 May 1923 | Bath City | 1–1 | Torquay United | Belvoir |
| | Goal | | Goal |

=== FA Cup ===
| 21 Sep 1922 Preliminary round | Torquay United | 3–0 | Clevedon | Plainmoor |
| | Thompson; Miller |

| 7 Oct 1922 First round qualifying | Welton Rovers | 3–2 | Torquay United | West Clewes |
| | Goal | | Miller |

=== Devon Professional Cup ===
| 24 Jan 1923 Semi Final | Exeter City XI | 0–1 | Torquay United | St James Park |
| | | | Goal |

| 21 Mar 1923 Final | Plymouth Argyle XI | 2–1 | Torquay United | Home Park |
| | Goal | | Goal |
