= Harry Raymond =

Harry, Henry or Harold Raymond may refer to:

- Harry Raymond (baseball) (1862–1925), Major League Baseball player
- Harry Raymond (footballer), English footballer
- Tubby Raymond (Harold Raymond, 1926–2017), American football and baseball player
- Henry Jarvis Raymond (1820–1869), politician and journalist
- Henry Judson Raymond alias of Adam Worth (c. 1844 – 1902), criminal

== See also ==
- Hal Raymond, character in An Almost Perfect Affair
