= Marcus Murphy (footballer) =

English footballer (1914–2007)

Personal information
- Full name: Marcus Montagu Murphy
- Date of birth: 16 November 1914
- Place of birth: Tavistock, England
- Date of death: August 2007 (aged 92)
- Place of death: Wisbech, England
- Position: Inside forward

Senior career*
Years	Team	Apps	(Gls)
- St Austell
- Plymouth & Stonehouse Gas
- Plymouth United
- → Middlesbrough (guest)
1946–1948	Plymouth Argyle	15	(1)
1948–1949	Chelmsford City	12	(5)
- Wisbech Town
- * Club domestic league appearances and goals

Marcus Montagu Murphy (14 November 1914 – August 2007) was an English footballer who played as an inside forward.

== Career ==
Murphy's early career was spent in South West England with St Austell, Plymouth & Stonehouse Gas and Plymouth United. During World War II, Murphy guested for Middlesbrough, before returning to Plymouth to sign for Plymouth Argyle. At Plymouth, Murphy made 15 Football League appearances for the club, scoring once. In 1948, following a period in Plymouth's reserves, Murphy signed for Chelmsford City. In 1949, Murphy signed for Wisbech Town after he wasn't retained by Chelmsford.
