= Billy Kellock =

English footballer

Personal information
- Full name: William Kellock
- Date of birth: 18 April 1889
- Place of birth: Stockport, England
- Date of death: 1958 (aged 68–69)
- Positions: Inside forward; outside forward

Senior career*
Years	Team	Apps	(Gls)
	Stockport County	0	(0)
–1913	St Brieux		
1913–1921	Plymouth Argyle	39	(15)
1921	Torquay Town		
1921–1922	Aberdare Athletic	15	(4)
1922–1923	Barrow	29	(12)
1923–1925	Torquay United		
- * Club domestic league appearances and goals

William Kellock (18 April 1889 – 1958) was an English football player and manager. Capable of playing as an inside and outside forward, he spent the majority of his career with Plymouth Argyle, appearing for the club in the Southern League and the Football League. He also played for Aberdare Athletic and Barrow in the Football League. Kellock later played in the Southern League for Torquay United.

== Career ==
Kellock was born in Stockport. He began his career with Stockport County, where he failed to make a first team appearance and he played for French club St Brieux before moving to Plymouth Argyle in 1913. He made six appearances in the Southern League, scoring one goal, before the First World War began. He scored 14 goals in 21 wartime matches as a guest player for Burnley, and also appeared for his old club, Stockport. With competitive football restored, Kellock was Argyle's top goalscorer in the 1919–20 season with 13 from 28 matches. The club was elected to the Football League in 1920 and he made six appearances in the Third Division before being transferred to Torquay Town. In 1921, he played for Torquay in the Western League before returning to League football later that year with Aberdare Athletic, where he scored four times in 15 appearances. He moved on to Barrow in 1922, scoring 12 goals in 29 matches, and then returned to Devon to join Torquay United, the result of a merger between Torquay Town and Babbacombe. Kellock appeared regularly for the club in the Southern League and finished top goalscorer in the 1923–24 and 1924–25 seasons.
