= Babbacombe F.C. =

Babbacombe
- Full name: Babbacombe Football Club
- Founded: 1903
- Dissolved: 1921
- Ground: Plainmoor, Torquay
- League: Plymouth & District League
- 1920–21: 8th
Home colours

Babbacombe Football Club was an English football club based in Torquay, Devon. The club existed from 1903 until 1921 before merging with Torquay Town to form Torquay United.

== History ==
A Babbacombe club played friendlies in 1903–04, but the club was properly formed in 1904 in time to join the Torquay & District League at the start of the 1904–05 season, becoming champions twice in 1907 and 1908. The league also included local rivals Ellacombe and (later) Torquay United. In 1908, Babbacombe moved up to the East Devon Senior League and in 1909 up again to the Plymouth and District League. Babbacombe won the East Devon Senior Cup in 1910 after being beaten finalists in 1908 and 1909. By 1910, there was feeling throughout the town of Torquay that their three most successful football teams should amalgamate in order to create a single professional club. Although Babbacombe refused to take part in a merger, Torquay United and Ellacombe agreed to pool their resources and became Torquay Town. Ironically, despite wishing to remain independent, Babbacombe now moved from their Palk Arms home (at the lower end of what is now the Golf Club) to Plainmoor in a groundshare arrangement with Torquay Town. They had previously played at the upper end of what is now the Golf Club in Petitor Road and prior to that at Walls Hill.

Torquay Town joined Babbacombe in the Plymouth & District League at the start of the 1910–11 season. However, while Torquay Town initially flourished in their new league, Babbacombe struggled to compete. In the 1911–12 season, Babbacombe finished bottom of the table while their newly created rivals were crowned champions. Despite this, by the 1913–14 season, Town's form began to suffer and they finished below Babbacombe in what was the Plymouth & District League's final season before the outbreak of World War I.

When the league resumed in 1919, Babbacombe again ended the season above their local rivals. Nevertheless, when Devon's two most successful teams, Plymouth Argyle and Exeter City, became founder members of the Third Division South in 1920, the desire for Torquay to have a Football League club of its own became too great even for Babbacombe to resist. So, at the end of the 1920–21 season, Babbacombe merged with Torquay Town and, after reviving the name of Torquay United, were eventually elected into the Football League in 1927.

== Honours ==
- Torquay & District League
  - Champions (2): 1906–07, 1907–08

== Seasons ==
Season	Division	Position	Pl.	W	D	L	F	A	P
1904–05	Torquay & District League	6th	14	5	0	9	29	30	10
1905–06	Torquay & District League	2nd	18	13	3	2	70	28	29
1906–07	Torquay & District League	1st	14	12	1	1	56	12	25
1907–08	Torquay & District League	1st	12	10	1	1	33	12	21
1908–09	East Devon League	2nd	10	7	1	2	30	10	15
1909–10	Plymouth & District League	11th	28	7	6	15	43	59	20
1910–11	Plymouth & District League	12th	24	6	1	17	35	53	13
1911–12	Plymouth & District League	16th	30	2	2	26	29	103	6
1912–13	Plymouth & District League	12th	26	6	7	13	34	56	19
1913–14	Plymouth & District League	6th	26	11	4	11	58	60	26
No competitive football played for the duration of World War I
1919–20	Plymouth & District League	6th	24	9	7	8	39	39	25
1920–21	Plymouth & District League	8th	22	9	1	12	48	60	19
