= Ellacombe F.C. =

Ellacombe
- Full name: Ellacombe Football Club
- Dissolved: 1910
- Ground: Plainmoor, Torquay
- League: Torquay & District League
- 1909–10: 8th

Ellacombe Football Club was an English football club based in Torquay, Devon. The club existed until 1910, before merging with the original Torquay United to form Torquay Town. A further merger between Torquay Town and Babbacombe resulted in the formation of the current Torquay United.

== History ==
Ellacombe CLB (Church Lads’ Brigade) FC was formed in 1901 by the new vicar of Ellacombe Rev. Percy Baker. They dropped CLB from their name in 1903 when they became founder members of the East Devon FA and of the Torquay & District League. They won the league in its inaugural season and again in the 1905–06 season. Ellacombe played their home games at the Ellacombe end of Plainmoor which was laid out as two pitches at the time. When Torquay Athletic’s lease at Plainmmor was terminated in 1904, Rev Baker took on a tenancy at will lease to enable Ellacombe to stay in place. When builders outbid the council for the land in 1909, Baker raised £500 from donations to allow the council to buy the land and keep it for football.

In 1908, Ellacombe joined the Plymouth-centred Devon League. Their rivals Babbacombe joined the Exeter-centred East Devon League with both clubs’ reserve teams continuing in the Torquay & District League alongside Torquay United’s first team.

By 1910, Devon's two most successful football clubs, Plymouth Argyle and Exeter City, had turned professional and there was general feeling in Torquay that the three rivals would need to amalgamate if the town was to have a professional team of its own. Although Babbacombe were firmly against any kind of merger, Ellacombe and Torquay United agreed to join forces and a new club, named Torquay Town was formed. Torquay Town existed until 1921 when Babbacombe finally succumbed to a merger, whereupon the three local rivals were joined at last to (once again) become Torquay United.

== Honours ==
- Torquay & District League
  - Champions (2): 1903–04, 1905–06

== Seasons ==
Season	Division	Position	Pl.	W	D	L	F	A	P
1903–04	Torquay & District League	1st	12	11	1	0	36	8	23
1904–05	Torquay & District League	2nd	14	10	1	3	44	11	21
1905–06	Torquay & District League	1st	18	14	4	0	79	27	32
1906–07	Torquay & District League	3rd	13	8	2	3	32	16	18
1907–08	Torquay & District League	2nd	12	8	1	2	29	11	17
1908–09	Devon League	3rd	18	10	1	7	48	37	21
1909–10	Devon League	4th	18	9	3	6	54	40	21
