= William Burley (footballer) =

English footballer

Personal information
- Full name: William Roberts Elliott Burley
- Date of birth: 3 January 1899
- Place of birth: Devonport, Plymouth, England
- Date of death: 1976 (aged 75–76)
- Position: Inside forward

Senior career*
Years	Team	Apps	(Gls)
1920–1921	Torquay Town		
1921–1922	Torquay United		
1922–1923	Swansea Town	0	(0)
1923–1924	Peterborough & Fletton United		
1924–1925	Grimsby Town	5	(0)
1925	Peterborough & Fletton United		
1925–1927	Millwall	15	(3)
1927–1928	Norwich City	0	(0)
- * Club domestic league appearances and goals

William Roberts Elliott Burley (3 January 1899 – 1976) was an English professional footballer who played as an inside forward.
