= Buckfastleigh Racecourse =

Horse-racing venue in Buckfastleigh, England

Buckfastleigh
- Location: Buckfastleigh, Devon
- Coordinates: 50.4650°N 3.7878°W
- Owned by: Defunct
- Date opened: 21 June 1883
- Date closed: 27 August 1960
- Course type: National Hunt

Buckfastleigh Racecourse (21 June 1883 - 27 August 1960) was a British horse racing venue.

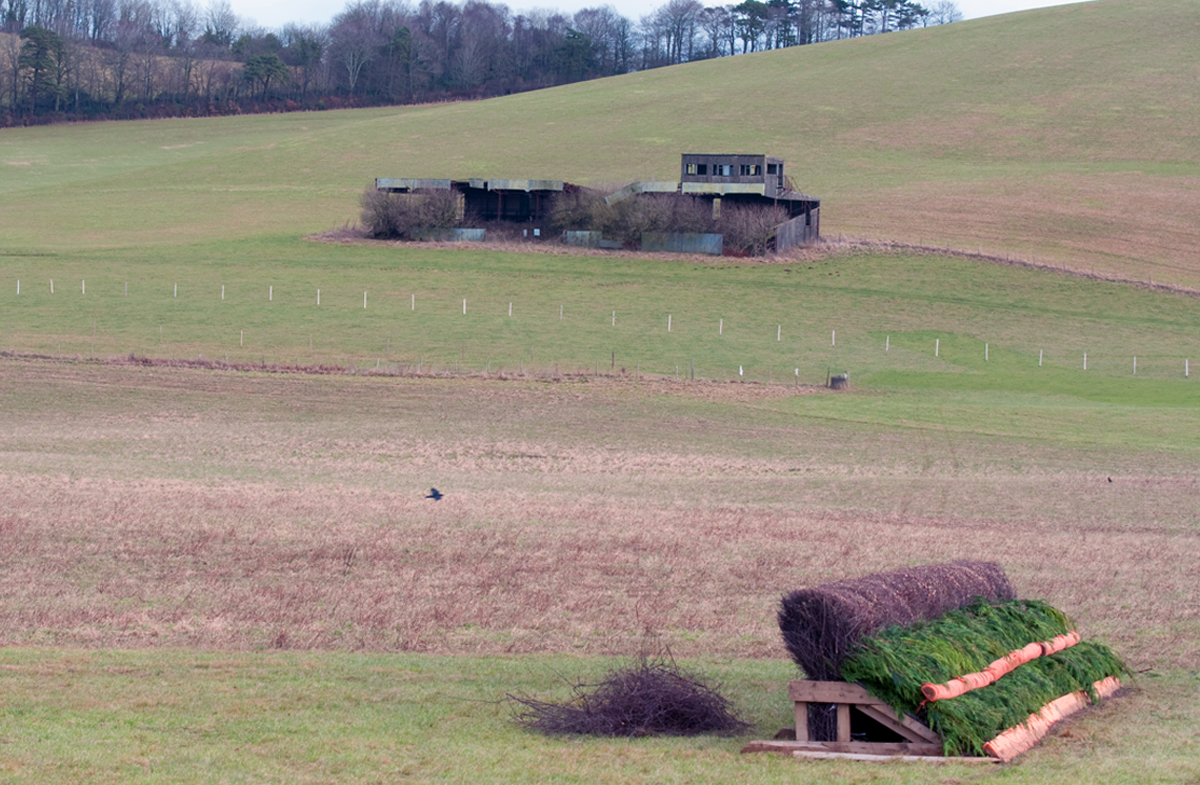
Grandstand in 2010

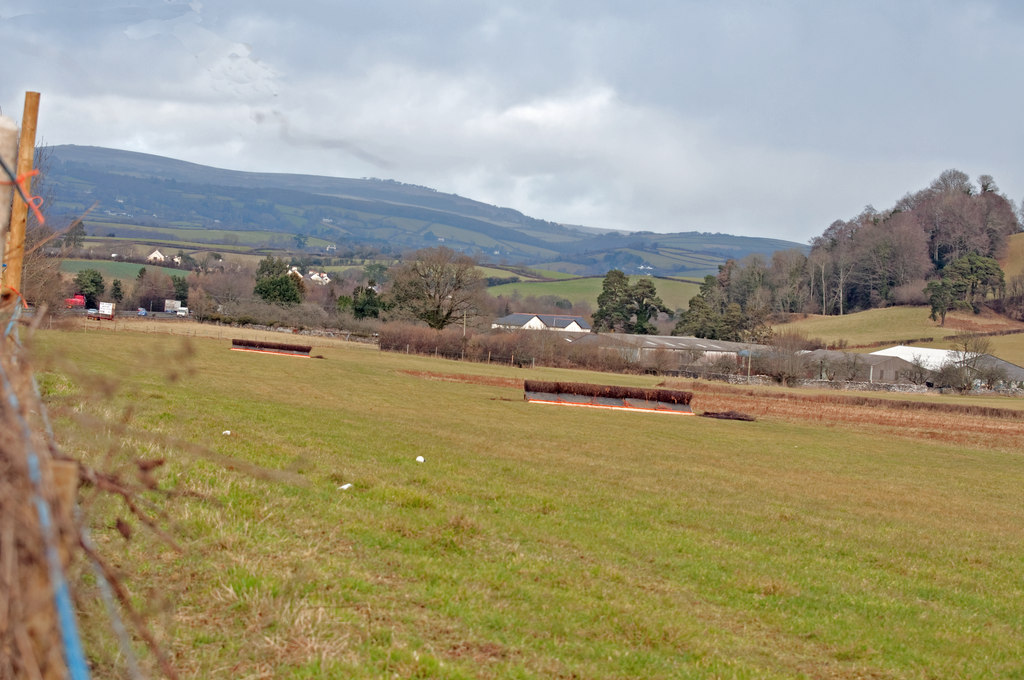
Jumps at Buckfastleigh in 2010

== History ==
Horse racing is first recorded at Buckfastleigh in the mid 1850s, on a course on Wallaford Down.

In 1883, the town's race meeting was relocated just outside Buckfastleigh to a place called Dean Court on the Dean Marshes, close to the A38 between Plymouth and Exeter. The first race meeting was held at this new location on 21 June 1883 and continued unbroken for over 75 years, until the final race "under rules" took place on 27 August 1960. The course was on land owned by Lord Churston, and when this was sold as part of the general decline of the old "great estates", racing had to cease and five days scheduled for 1961 were cancelled. The race days were taken over by the surviving Devon venues, Newton Abbot Racecourse and the then Devon and Exeter Racecourse.

== Legacy ==
The main grandstand remains, and has become a well-known landmark in the area. A sister grandstand was relocated to Plainmoor, home ground of Torquay United football club in 1927.

Point-to-point meetings continued to be held from 1960 until 1977, during which time most of the course returned to farmland. Point-to-points have subsequently been revived and continue to this day.

== Notable races ==
- Dartmoor 3 mile Chase
