= David Graham (footballer, born 1978) =

Scottish footballer

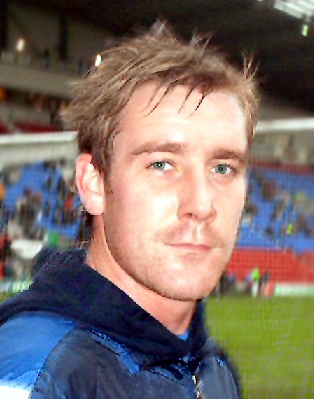

Personal information
- Full name: David Baillie Graham
- Date of birth: 6 October 1978 (age 48)
- Place of birth: Edinburgh, Scotland
- Height: 5 ft 10 in (1.78 m)
- Position: Striker

Senior career*
Years	Team	Apps	(Gls)
1995–1998	Rangers	3	(0)
1998–2001	Dunfermline Athletic	39	(4)
2001	→ Inverness Caledonian Thistle (loan)	2	(0)
2001–2004	Torquay United	120	(47)
2004–2005	Wigan Athletic	30	(1)
2005–2007	Sheffield Wednesday	24	(2)
2006	→ Huddersfield Town (loan)	16	(9)
2006–2007	→ Bradford City (loan)	22	(3)
2007	→ Torquay United (loan)	7	(0)
2007–2008	Gillingham	16	(3)
2008	Lincoln City	9	(0)
2009	Sheffield	2	(2)
2009–2010	Ilkeston Town	17	(4)
2010	Sheffield	16	(3)
2010–2011	Worksop Town	0	(0)
2011	Hucknall Town		
2011-?	Sheffield	22	(4)

International career
1997–1998	Scotland U21	8	(1)
- * Club domestic league appearances and goals

David Baillie Graham (born 6 October 1978) is a Scottish footballer. His favoured position is as a forward, although he can also play in midfield. He has been capped at Under-21 level by his country.

== Playing career ==
Born in Edinburgh, Scotland, Graham began his career with Rangers, making his debut in the 5–3 away win against Shelbourne in the UEFA Cup first qualifying round first leg. He made four further appearances, all as a substitute before moving to Dunfermline Athletic in November 1998. He joined Inverness Caledonian Thistle on loan in January 2001, before moving to Torquay United on loan in March that year. He settled in well at Torquay United, helping the Devon side retain their league status on the final day of the season in the crucial game at Barnet. In July that year he signed permanently for Torquay and played a major role in turning the club's fortunes around, culminating in automatic promotion at the end of the 2003–04 season.

=== Wigan Athletic ===
Not surprisingly his form had been noticed by larger clubs than Torquay United and he moved to Wigan Athletic in June 2004 for a fee of £215,000. Despite helping Wigan to the Premier League, scoring once against Coventry City in the process, he moved to Sheffield Wednesday in August 2005 for a fee of £250,000.

=== Sheffield Wednesday ===
A slow start to his career at Hillsborough led him to sign on loan at Huddersfield Town on 23 January 2006, until the end of the season. He scored nine goals in seventeen appearances for Huddersfield Town, helping them to ensure a play-off place in League One, if not quite automatic promotion.

Graham was blocked from Wednesday's 2006 tour of the United States, visa restrictions due to a minor police offence nine years previously preventing his entry to the country. Wednesday accepted an undisclosed bid for Graham from Blackpool on 27 July 2006, but he turned down the move, instead joining Bradford City on a five-month loan deal.

After returning from his unsuccessful spell at Bradford, Graham again found it hard to break into Wednesday's first team under Brian Laws not making a single starting appearance for the first team.

On 21 March it was announced that Graham had returned to relegation threatened League Two club Torquay United on loan until the end of the season. It later became clear that Graham had been transfer listed, fined two weeks wages and sent to Torquay due to a 'serious breach of club discipline'. Graham was unable to prevent Torquay's relegation from the Football League.

He finished his Wednesday career with three goals in 26 appearances.

=== Gillingham ===
At the end of the 2006–07 season Graham was told he had no future at the club and made available for transfer. He joined Gillingham on trial in July 2007. He was released by Sheffield Wednesday on 6 August 2007 and signed for Gillingham on a one-year contract the following day. He made his debut for Gillingham on 11 August 2007 against Cheltenham Town, as his side went down 1–0. He scored his first goals for the club on 2 October when he scored two in a 3–1 defeat of Leyton Orient. On 31 January, it was announced that he had been released from his contract.

=== Lincoln City ===
On 27 June 2008, Graham agreed to join former manager Peter Jackson at Lincoln City on a six-month deal. He made his debut against Rotherham United in a 1–0 defeat, and played ten games, eight as substitute, but failed to score during his six months. Lincoln City released him when his six-month contract came to an end.

=== Non-League ===
In March 2009 he signed for Sheffield of the Northern Premier League and then moved on to Conference North outfit Ilkeston Town. Following the winding-up of Ilkeston Town, Graham rejoined Sheffield F.C. debuting in the 2–0 Northern Premier League Division One South away defeat to Carlton Town on 18 September 2010.

In late October 2010 he moved to Worksop Town. At the start of the 2011–12 season, Graham signed for a third spell at Sheffield F.C.

== Honours ==
Individual

- PFA Team of the Year: 2003–04 Third Division
