= 1886–87 Argyle F.C. season =

English football club season

The 1886–87 football season marked the formation of Plymouth Argyle Football Club. The team was originally called Argyle F.C.

== History ==
The club was formed in September 1886 by former college and public school students who wished to continue playing the game. The inspiration for the name Argyle is thought to have come from Argyle Terrace, a local street in a suburb of Plymouth called Mutley. At this time organised League football did not exist. Instead "first class matches", otherwise known as "exhibition matches", were arranged on a largely ad hoc basis and supplemented by cup competitions. Official records from these matches are sketchy at best, but what is certain is that the club played its first match on 9 October 1886 against Dunheved College (now Launceston Technology College) in Launceston.

The club continued in this manner, playing matches at numerous venues in the area, until the decision was made to set up a professional club in the city in 1903. Frank Brettell, a football administrator, was invited to achieve this goal and gain entry to the Southern Football League. He achieved them both, Plymouth Argyle Football Club were elected into the Southern Football League and Western Football League that same year, and they played their first match on 1 September 1903 against West Ham United, winning 1–0.

== Exhibition Matches ==
9 October 1886	Dunheved College	2–0	Argyle Football Club	Launceston, Cornwall

16 October 1886	Caxton	4–2	Argyle Football Club

30 October 1886	Plymouth College	1–2	Argyle Football Club	Plymouth, Devon

6 November 1886	Argyle Football Club	5-0	Royal Artillery	Granby Barracks, Devonport, Devon

13 November 1886	Tavistock Grammar School	3-1	Argyle Football Club	Tavistock, Devon

20 November 1886	Argyle Football Club	v	Mannamead School	Plymouth, Devon

4 December 1886	Argyle Football Club	v	Hotspur Football Club	Plymouth, Devon

11 December 1886	Argyle Football Club	v	Plymouth United	Plymouth, Devon

15 January 1887	Old Plymothians	10-0	Argyle Football Club	Ford Park, Plymouth, Devon

22 January 1887	Mannamead School	v	Argyle Football Club	Plymouth, Devon

29 January 1887	Plymouth	1-2	Argyle Football Club	Plymouth, Devon

5 February 1887	Hotspur Football Club	v	Argyle Football Club	Plymouth, Devon

19 February 1887	Argyle Football Club	v	Corporation Grammar School	Plymouth, Devon

5 March 1887	Plymouth United	v	Argyle Football Club	Plymouth, Devon

12 March 1887	Argyle Football Club	v	Plymouth College	Plymouth, Devon
