= Torquay Town F.C. =

Torquay Town
- Full name: Torquay Town Football Club
- Founded: 1910
- Dissolved: 1921
- Ground: Plainmoor, Torquay
- League: Plymouth & District League
- 1920–21: 6th
Home colours

Torquay Town Football Club was an English football club based in Torquay, Devon. The club existed from 1910 until 1921 before merging with Babbacombe to form Torquay United.

== History ==
By 1910, the Devon town of Torquay had three established amateur football teams in Babbacombe (competing in the Plymouth & District League), Ellacombe ( in the Devon League) and Torquay United in the Torquay & District League. With Devon's two leading football clubs, Plymouth Argyle and Exeter City having already turned professional, there were calls for Torquay's three main teams to amalgamate in order to create a single professional football club. Although Babbacombe preferred to maintain their independence, Ellacombe and United merged to become Torquay Town. With United having led a somewhat nomadic existence since their foundation in 1899, the newly formed Torquay Town chose Ellacombe's Plainmoor ground as their home where, ironically, they would soon be joined in a ground share with Babbacombe.

Both Torquay Town and Babbacombe joined the Plymouth & District League for the 1910–11 season and Town enjoyed a respectable first season finishing 5th out of 13 teams. They also enjoyed a good run in the FA Cup, reaching the fifth qualifying round before being knocked out by Accrington Stanley. Torquay Town's second season was even better, becoming champions of the Plymouth & District League. However, the following two seasons saw a decline in Town's fortunes finishing in 6th and then 10th place before the outbreak of World War I resulted in the closure of the club in August 1914.

When competitive football resumed in 1919, Torquay Town were unable to recreate the achievements of their earlier seasons and, with Babbacombe now conceding to the inevitability of a merger between the two rival sides, both teams ceased to exist at the end of the 1920–21 season and subsequently joined to form a new professional club. Installing Torquay Town's star striker Crad Evans as player-manager, the new team revived the name of Torquay United and were eventually elected into the Football League in 1927.

== Honours ==
- Plymouth & District League
  - Champions: 1911–12
- Devon Senior Cup
  - Winners: 1910–11

== Seasons ==
Season	Division	Position	Pl.	W	D	L	F	A	P	FA Cup
1910–11	Plymouth & District League	5th	24	13	3	8	54	33	29	Fifth round qualifying
1911–12	Plymouth & District League	1st	30	23	4	3	85	29	50	First round qualifying
1912–13	Plymouth & District League	6th	26	11	6	9	42	43	28	did not enter
1913–14	Plymouth & District League	10th	26	10	4	12	55	52	24	Extra preliminary round
No competitive football played for the duration of World War I
1919–20	Plymouth & District League	10th	24	7	1	16	41	46	15	did not enter
1920–21	Plymouth & District League	6th	22	10	5	7	35	39	25	Extra preliminary round
