= William Burley (priest) =

Anglican priest in Ireland

William Burley was an Anglican priest in Ireland during the 17th century.

Burley was educated at Trinity College, Dublin. The incumbent at Cahir he was appointed a prebendary of St Patrick's Cathedral, Dublin in 1630; and Dean of Clonmacnoise in 1634, serving until 1640.
