= Plymouth United F.C. =

English former football & rugby union club, based in Plymouth

Plymouth United Football Club was an association football and rugby club from Plymouth, Devon, England, formed by 1877 at the latest. It was reported that they were beaten 6–0 at home by the Torquay & South Devon Football Club, likely in a rugby match, on 22 December that year, and that the Torquay team were surprised by the poor standard of their opposition.

As a pioneering club in Devon it played against Argyle Football Club in its first season and was one of eight founding members of the Devon County Football Association.

Another team called Plymouth United was formed in 1944, along with Plymouth City, made up of ex-Plymouth Argyle and local amateurs. They played against local sides and service teams helping to re-establish football in the area. A team of the same name entered the FA Cup in 1946, 1947 and 1950, failing to win a match.

Another Plymouth United was established in 2011. As of the 2018–19 season of the Plymouth and West Devon Football League, it had one Saturday team and three Sunday teams, along with five youth teams, and played home games at Plymouth Marjon.
