= Plymouth Cricket Club =

Team information
- Established: 1828
- Home venue: Plymouth Cricket Ground; 51 Discovery Road; Plymouth; PL1 4PR

Plymouth Cricket Club is a cricket club who have four teams playing in the Devon Cricket League. The club was formed at least by 1828, when a meeting was held at Plymouth Racecourse, Chelson Meadow. The first and second teams play at Mount Wise Cricket Ground, formerly used by the United Services Cricket Club and before them The Garrison Cricket Club.

During the COVID-19 pandemic, the ground was used as a vaccination centre.
