= Dartmouth A.F.C. =

Association football club in England

Coordinates: 50°20′51.2″N 3°35′57.9″W

Dartmouth A.F.C
- Full name: Dartmouth Association Football Club
- Nickname: The Darts
- Founded: 1999
- Ground: Longcross, Dartmouth
- Manager: Josh Briscomb
- League: South Devon Football League
- 2025–26: Devon League, 8th of 17
Home colours

Dartmouth Association Football Club is a football club based in Dartmouth, Devon, England. They are currently members of the Devon Football League and play at Longcross.

== History ==
Established in 1908 as Dartmouth United, the club began competing in the Torbay and District League. They later moved into the Plymouth and District League, winning the title five times, but went back to the South Devon League for the 1968–69 season. They finished in the top two in each of their first three seasons in the South Devon League, winning the competition twice. In 1995, the club finished as runners-up in the South Devon League, winning automatic promotion to the Devon County League. They finished 4th in their first season and, the following season (1995–96), won the Premier League Cup, and finished runners-up in both the League and League Cup.

In mid-1999, Dartmouth United and Dartmouth Y.M.R.C. amalgamated to form Dartmouth A.F.C. The new club won the Devon County League title in 2001–02 and 2002–03, but opted to remain in the Devon League rather than climb the non-league pyramid.

In June 2012 before the 2012–13 season, the club faced some bad news when the FA refused to allow them to enter any national FA competitions due to not meeting the required criteria to compete. Shortly after, the club resigned from the South West Peninsula League altogether and the first team took the place of the reserve side in the South Devon League Division One. They finished in a respectable 4th in their first season in Division One before winning the division in the 2013/14 season to move up into the Premier Division. The club also won the Firewatch Devon Senior Cup in the 2013/14 season.

Dartmouth's first season back in the Premier Division (2014/15) ended with them finishing in third place and they finished as runners-up the following season (2015/16) The reserve side also won the Division Three double that year. At the end of the 2018/19 season, Dartmouth AFC won 2-0 vs Buckland Reserves to win the George Belli Cup at Dartington, with goals scored by Ryan Frost and Scott McRoy, captained by Ben Greeno. At the end of 2018–19 the South West Peninsula League was restructured, and Dartmouth successfully applied for a double promotion to the Premier Division East, at Step 6 of the National League System. The club badge was designed by Neil Patey on the amalgamation of Dartmouth United and Dartmouth YMRC, the castles represent Dartmouth and Kingswear castles and the black and red stripes are the former colours of the two clubs. The badge was updated by player and designer, Scott Mcroy.

== Ground ==
Dartmouth play their home games at Longcross, Milton Lane, Dartmouth, Devon, TQ6 9LW.

== Former players ==
One of their most famous former players is Ralph Birkett, who left Dartmouth to play for Torquay United and went on to play for the England national football team.

== Season-by-season record since 1995 ==
Season	Division	Position
1995-96	Devon County League	4th
1996-97	Devon County League	2nd
1997-98	Devon County League	9th
1998-99	Devon County League	7th
1999-2000	Devon County League	8th
2000-01	Devon County League	5th
2001-02	Devon County League	1st
2002-03	Devon County League	1st
2003-04	Devon County League	9th
2004-05	Devon County League	3rd
2005-06	Devon County League	5th
2006-07	Devon County League	1st
2007-08	South West Peninsula League	7th
2008-09	South West Peninsula League, Premier Division	7th
2009-10	South West Peninsula League, Premier Division	15th
2010-11	South West Peninsula League, Premier Division	18th
2011-12	South West Peninsula League, Premier Division	14th
2012-13	South Devon Football League, Division One	4th
2013-14	South Devon Football League, Division One	1st
2014-15	South Devon Football League, Premier Division	3rd
2015-16	South Devon Football League, Premier Division	2nd
2016-17	South Devon Football League, Premier Division	5th
2017-18	South Devon Football League, Premier Division	6th

== Honours ==
- Devon League Champions: 3
  - 2001–02, 2002–03, 2006–07
- Devon League Runners-up: 1
  - 1996–97
- Throgmorton Cup Winners: 1
  - 2006–07
- Throgmorton Cup Runners-up: 2
  - 1996–97, 2003–04
- Devon Premier Cup Winners: 2
  - 1996–97, 2006–07
- Devon Premier Cup Finalists: 1
  - 2000–01
- Devon Senior Cup Winners: 4
  - 1927–28, 1948–49, 1954–55, 2013–14
- Herald Cup Winners: 2
  - 1927–28, 1973–74
- South Devon League Champions: 2
  - 1968–69, 1970–71 (Runners-up 1969–70 and 1994–95)
- Devon League Charity Shield Winners: 1
  - 2002–03
- Plymouth and District League Champions: 5
- George Belli Cup
  - 2018/19
