= Harry Raymond (footballer) =

English footballer and manager

Personal information
- Place of birth: Plymouth, England
- Position: Inside forward

Senior career*
Years	Team	Apps	(Gls)
- Woodland Villa
1908–1924	Plymouth Argyle	244	(47)
- Torquay United

International career
1913–1914	England Amateur	3	(–)

Managerial career
- 1924: Torquay United
- * Club domestic league appearances and goals

Harry W. Raymond was an English footballer who played as an inside forward. He made 67 appearances in the Football League for Plymouth Argyle and another 177 appearances in the Southern League. During his time with the club, Raymond was capped three times by the England amateur team. He also played for and managed Southern League side Torquay United.

== Life and career ==
He was born in Plymouth, where he began his career with amateur team Woodland Villa. He joined Southern League club Plymouth Argyle in 1908, but chose to retain his status as an amateur for a number of years. He made his debut in a 1–0 win at Bristol Rovers in September 1908 and scored his first goal for Argyle in a 2–2 draw with Brighton & Hove Albion in October 1909. Raymond won the Southern League championship with the club in 1913 and earned three amateur caps for England before competitive football was suspended for the duration of the First World War. He returned to Argyle when the war ended and was a member of the squad when they became a member of the Football League in 1920. He left in 1924, having scored 50 goals in 257 appearances, to finish his career with Southern League side Torquay United as player-manager.

== Honours ==
Plymouth Argyle

- Southern League winner: 1912–13
