= Plymouth and West Devon Football League =

Association football league in England

Plymouth & West Devon Football League
- Organising body: Devon FA
- Founded: 2004
- Country: England
- Divisions: 5 (1 Saturday, 4 Sunday)
- Number of clubs: 54 (12 Saturday, 42 Sunday)
- Promotion to: Devon Football League
- Current champions: Princerock (2025–26)

The Plymouth and West Devon Football League, or just the PWD or P&D, is a football competition based in Devon, England. The league's top division, the Premier Division, is a direct feeder to the Devon League South & West.

The league currently has one Saturday division – the Premier Division – along with four Sunday divisions.

== History ==
In Plymouth, between World War One and Two there was a United Churches League – which was the origin of the Plymouth Combination League. This league later amalgamated with the Plymouth and District League to become the Plymouth and District Combination League, and then in 2004 the league in its current format was formed, with the amalgamation of Plymouth's two Sunday leagues, the West Devon Sunday Football League and the Plymouth Sunday Football League, to become the Plymouth and West Devon Combination Football League. It is thus one of the few leagues in England to administer both Saturday and Sunday competitions. Because of this, many clubs have both Saturday and Sunday teams under the same name and the league allows players to register for both Saturday and Sunday teams.

Since 1904 a youth league, the Devon Junior and Minor League, has existed as a platform for teams with age ranges of U9s to U18s in Plymouth, South West Devon and East Cornwall. Numerous clubs in the PWD have youth teams in the DJM, although this is more common with fully fledged sports clubs, and less common with 'pub teams'.

== 2025–26 Saturday member clubs ==
=== Premier Division ===
- Future Stars
- Horrabridge Rangers
- Lakeside Athletic Reserves
- Lydford Foxes
- ~~Lugger~~
- Morley Rangers
- Plymouth Hope
- Princerock
- Signal Box Oak Villa Reserves
- Stannary Town
- Tavistock Development
- University of Plymouth

== 2025–26 Sunday member clubs ==
=== Premier Division ===
- Billacombe
- BSB Harchester
- Estover United
- Harbertonford
- Hooe Rovers
- Plymouth Phoenix
- Porto Plymouth
- Queen & Constitution
- Tamerton Foliot

=== Division One ===
- Billacombe 2nds
- Carpathian Wolves
- Cherry Tree
- Hunter District
- Ker Street United
- Kings Arms
- Plymouth Hope
- Plymouth True Blues
- Plympton Legion
- Queen & Constitution 2nds
- Seymour Arms
- Tamar View

=== Division Two ===
- Admiral MacBride
- Chaddlewood Miners Old Boys
- Horrabridge Rangers
- Hunter District 2nds
- Inter Plymouth
- Princetown
- Seymour Arms 2nds
- South Brent
- Sporting Club Plymouth
- Tamar View 2nds

=== Division Three ===
- Admiral MacBride 2nds
- Aylesbury Crescent
- Devon Athletic
- Elm United
- FC Galacticos
- Firkin Scholar
- Keyham Vault Rangers
- Pilgrim Athletic
- Tavistock Wanderers
- Tech Surveys

== Previous League Champions ==
Season	Premier	Senior	Intermediate
07–08:	Wessex LA Rangers	Royal Mail	Horrabridge Rangers Reserves
08–09:	Mount Gould FC	The Ordulph Arms	Roborough FC Reserves

The divisions were renamed ahead of the 2009–10 season.

Season	One	Two	Three	Four	Sunday One
09–10:	Tamarside FC	Roborough Reserves	Windsor Car Sales	–	
10–11:	Mount Gould FC	Chaddlewood Miners OB	Vospers Oak Villa Reserves	–	
11–12:	Roborough FC	Lee Moor FC	The Hideaway Cafe	The Windmill	
12–13:	Mount Gould FC	The Windmill (Devon)	Plymouth Hope	Sporting Plymouth	The Railway Inn
13–14:	Mount Gould FC	Morley Rangers	Sporting Plymouth	Ernesettle DRDE Trust	Kings Tamerton CA

The divisions were again renamed ahead of the 2014–15 season. Sunday records are incomplete prior to the 2016–17 season.

Season	Premier	One	Two	Three	Sunday One	Sunday Two	Sunday Three
14–15:	Mount Gould FC	Bar Sol Ona	Belgrave FC	Pennycross SC	The Navy Inn		
15–16:	Plymouth Marjon	Millbridge Reserves	Lakeside Athletic	West Hart Rangers	The Navy Inn		
16–17:	The Windmill (Devon)	Lakeside Athletic	The Chaddlewood Inn	Lakeside Athletic Reserves	Athletico Oak Villa	Bull Point Athletic	Signal Box Oak Villa
17–18:	Mount Gould FC	Maristow FC	Millbridge FC	Horrabridge Rangers	The Navy Inn	Central Park Rangers	–

The Sunday divisions were renamed to match the Saturday divisions ahead of the 2018–19 season.

Season	Premier	One	Two	Sunday Premier	Sunday One	Sunday Two	Sunday Three	Sunday Four
18–19:	Mount Gould FC	The Windmill (Devon) Reserves	Lakeside Athletic Reserves	The Navy Inn	Headways Reserves	Activate Reserves		
19–20:^{1}	The Windmill (Devon)	Signal Box Oak Villa Reserves		The Navy Inn	Grenville FC			
20–21:	Millbridge FC	Morley Rangers	Mainstone Social FC	Drakes Drum FC	Tamar View Reserves	Plymouth Phoenix		
21–22:	DC Auto Repairs	Mainstone Social	FC Tavyside	Queen and Constitution	Plymouth Phoenix	Plymouth Marjon	Plympton Athletic	
22–23:	Signal Box Oak Villa	Lugger Devonport		Elburton Villa	Plymouth Marjon	Tamerton Foliot	Stoke Bar & Grill	Central Park Rangers
23–24:	Plymouth Phoenix	Lakeside Athletic Reserves		Queen and Constitution	Porto Plymouth	Ker Street	Plymouth Hope	Estover United
24–25:	Signal Box Oak Villa			Queen and Constitution	Woodside	Estover United	Signal Box Oak Villa	Harbertonford
25–26:	Princerock				Plymouth True Blues	Tamar View Reserves	Tech Surveys	

^{1} The 2019–20 season was abandoned by the league's executive committee due to the coronavirus pandemic. The teams listed here were in first place in the standings at the time of abandonment, but were not officially recognised as champions.

== Cup Competitions ==
- The Premier Cup (all Saturday teams)
- The Challenge Bowl (only Saturday division one teams)
- The Ken Rickard League Cup (all Sunday teams)
- The Sunday League Challenge Cup (only Sunday division one teams)
- The Brian Ayres Saturday Plate (for teams eliminated from the Premier Cup in the first round)
- The Brian Ayres Sunday Plate (for teams eliminated from the Ken Rickard League Cup in the first round)

== See also ==
- Devon Football League
- Duchy League
- East Cornwall League
- South Devon Football League
- South West Peninsula League
