= Crad Evans =

Welsh footballer and manager

Percival Craddock 'Crad' Evans (died 1 June 1949) was a Welsh football player and manager. He represented Wales at amateur international level. Evans moved to the Torquay area in 1904 from Wales, joining Ellacombe Football Club before moving to the newly formed Torquay Town side. He was Torquay's top goalscorer in five of the following seasons and later played for Plymouth Argyle and Exeter City.

In 1921 he became Torquay United's first ever player-manager.

Evans died in Paignton on 1 June 1949.
