= South Devon Football League =

Association football league in England

South Devon League
- Country: England
- Number of clubs: 64; 12 (Premier Division); 11 (Division One); 11 (Division Two); 10 (Division Three); 10 (Division Four); 10 (Division Five)
- Level on pyramid: Level 12 (Premier Division); Level 13 (Division 1); Level 14 (Division 2); Level 15 (Division 3); Level 16 (Division 4); Level 17 (Division 5)
- Feeder to: Devon Football League
- Domestic cup(s): Herald Cup, Fred Hewings Cup, Divisional Cups
- Current champions: Newton Abbot Spurs Reserves (Premier Division); Plymouth Phoenix (Division One); Mount Gould (Division Two); Ashburton (Division Three); Kingskerswell (Division Four) (2024–25)
- Website: South Devon Football League official website

The South Devon Football League, known under a sponsorship arrangement as the TCSSDFL, is a football competition based in England. Its top division, the Premier Division, sits outside of the English football league system although it is a feeder to the Devon Football League which sits at Step 7 (level 11) of this system. There are six divisions in the league.

The SDFL's primary cup competition is the Herald Cup, which is a simple knockout competition featuring all SDFL clubs (highest placed teams only).

Following the formation of the East Devon FA in 1903, the league came into existence as the Torquay and District League for the 1903–04 season. The first winners were Ellacombe. The league changed its name to the South Devon League for the 1920–21 season.

== 2026–27 Members ==
=== Premier Division ===
- Chudleigh Athletic
- East Allington United
- Elburton Villa Reserves
- Ilsington Villa
- Kingsteignton Athletic
- Lakeside Athletic
- Newton Abbot 66
- Newton Abbot Spurs Reserves
- Paignton Saints
- Plymouth True Blues
- Totnes & Dartington
- Watts Blake Bearne

=== Division One ===
- Babbacombe Corinthians
- Barton Athletic
- Beesands Rovers
- Bovey Tracey Reserves
- Brixham Town
- Buckfastleigh Rangers
- Buckland Athletic Reserves
- Mount Gould
- Paignton Villa
- Signal Box Frankfort
- Watcombe Wanderers

=== Division Two ===
- Ashburton
- East Allington United Reserves
- Galmpton United
- Ivybridge Town Reserves
- Kingskerswell
- Liverton United
- Newton Abbot Spurs 3rds
- Paignton Saints Reserves
- Paignton Villa Reserves
- Plymouth True Blues Reserves
- Tavistock Reserves

=== Division Three ===
- Buckfastleigh Rangers Reserves
- Chudleigh Athletic Reserves
- Horrabridge Rangers
- Ipplepen Athletic Reserves
- Kingsteignton Athletic Reserves
- Liverton United Reserves
- Newton Abbot 66 Reserves
- Newton Rovers
- Stoke Gabriel & Torbay Police Reserves
- Teign Village

=== Division Four ===
- Barton Athletic Reserves
- Bere Alston Reserves
- Brixham Town Reserves
- Buckland Athletic 3rds
- Ilsington Villa Reserves
- Lakeside Athletic Reserves
- Paignton Villa 3rds
- Signal Box Frankfort Reserves
- Waldon Athletic
- Windmill

=== Division Five ===
- Broadhempston United
- Kingsbridge & Kellaton United
- Newton Albion
- Newton Rovers Reserves
- Paignton Saints 3rds
- Tamerton Foliot
- Tavistock 3rds
- Upton Athletic
- Waldon Athletic Reserves
- Watts Blake Bearne Reserves

== Recent Divisional champions ==
Season	Premier	One	Two	Three	Four	Five	Six	Seven
2006–07	Brixham Villa							
2007–08	Bovey Tracey	Newton Abbot Reserves	Staverton & Landscove	Buckland Athletic Reserves	Dartmouth Reserves	Staverton & Landscove Reserves	Buckland Athletic 'A'	Watcombe Wanderers
2008–09	Kingskerswell & Chelston	Ashburton	Buckland Athletic Reserves	Buckfastleigh Rangers Reserves	Staverton & Landscove Reserves	Watcombe Wanderers	South Brent Reserves	N/A (Note: Division discontinued)
2009–10	Watts Blake & Bearne				Watcombe Wanderers			
2010–11	Upton Athletic	Loddiswell Athletic	Stoke Fleming	Watcombe Wanderers	Abbotskerswell Reserves	Bishopsteignton United	Buckland & Milber Reserves	
2011–12	Kingskerswell & Chelston	Teignmouth Reserves	Watcombe Wanderers	Bovey Tracey Reserves	Babbacombe Corinthians	Chudleigh Athletic Reserves	Roselands	
2012–13	Buckland Athletic Reserves	Watcombe Wanderers	Bovey Tracey Reserves	Upton Athletic Reserves	Bishopsteignton United	Roselands	Preston South End	
2013–14	Watcombe Wanderers	Dartmouth AFC	Babbacombe Corinthians	Buckland & Milber	Watcombe Wanderers Reserves	Buckfastleigh Rangers Reserves	Watcombe Wanderers 'A'	
2014–15	Buckland Athletic Reserves	Buckland Athletic 'A'	Foxhole United	Watcombe Wanderers Reserves	Liverton United Reserves	Watcombe Wanderers 'A'	N/A	
2015–16	Buckland Athletic Reserves	Ashburton	Roselands	Dartmouth AFC Reserves	Watcombe Wanderers 'A'	Torbay Police Reserves		
2016–17	Buckland Athletic Reserves	Roselands	Paignton Saints	Torbay Police	Ashburton Reserves	Bishopsteignton United Reserves		
2017–18	Ashburton	Harbertonford	Bovey Tracey Reserves	Meadowbrook Athletic	East Allington United Reserves	Watts Blake Bearne		
2018–19	Buckland Athletic Reserves	Paignton Saints	Buckfastleigh Rangers	Watts Blake Bearne	Galmpton United	N/A		
2021–22	Buckfastleigh Rangers	Kingsteignton Athletic	Ilsington Villa	Brixham Town	Waldon Athletic Reserves			
2022–23	Kingsteignton Athletic	Beesands Rovers	Watcombe Wanderers	Waldon Athletic Reserves	Watcombe Wanderers Reserves			
2023–24	Ilsington Villa	Newton Abbot Spurs Reserves	Bovey Tracey Reserves	Watcombe Wanderers Reserves	Elburton Villa Development			
2024–25	Newton Abbot Spurs Reserves	Plymouth Phoenix	Mount Gould	Ashburton	Kingskerswell			

== Recent Herald Cup winners ==
Season	Team
99–00:	Newton Abbot 66
00–01:	Kingsteignton Athletic
01–02:	Kingsteignton Athletic
02–03:	Upton Athletic
03–04:	Galmpton United
04–05:	Upton Athletic
05–06:	Brixham Villa
06–07:	Brixham Villa
07–08:	Hele Rovers
08–09:	Upton Athletic
09–10:	Watts Blake & Bearne
10–11:	Watcombe Wanderers
11–12:	Buckland Athletic Reserves
12–13:	Watcombe Wanderers
13–14:	Watcombe Wanderers
14–15:	Watcombe Wanderers
15–16:	Waldon Athletic
16–17:	East Allington United
17–18:	East Allington United
18–19:	Buckland Athletic Reserves
21–22:	Kingsteignton Athletic
22–23:	Kingsteignton Athletic
23–24:	Newton Abbot 66
24–25:	Waldon Athletic

== Other SDFL Cup competitions ==
The SDFL also run an additional 6 cup competitions. These are:

- Fred Hewings Cup (Reserve Sides)
- George Belli Cup (Premier Divisional Cup)
- Dartmouth Cup (First Divisional Cup)
- Lidstone Cup (Second Divisional Cup)
- Ronald Cup (Third Divisional Cup)
- Les Bishop Cup (Fourth Divisional Cup)
