= Plainmoor =

Football stadium in Torquay, Devon, England

Coordinates: 50°28′35″N 3°31′26″W

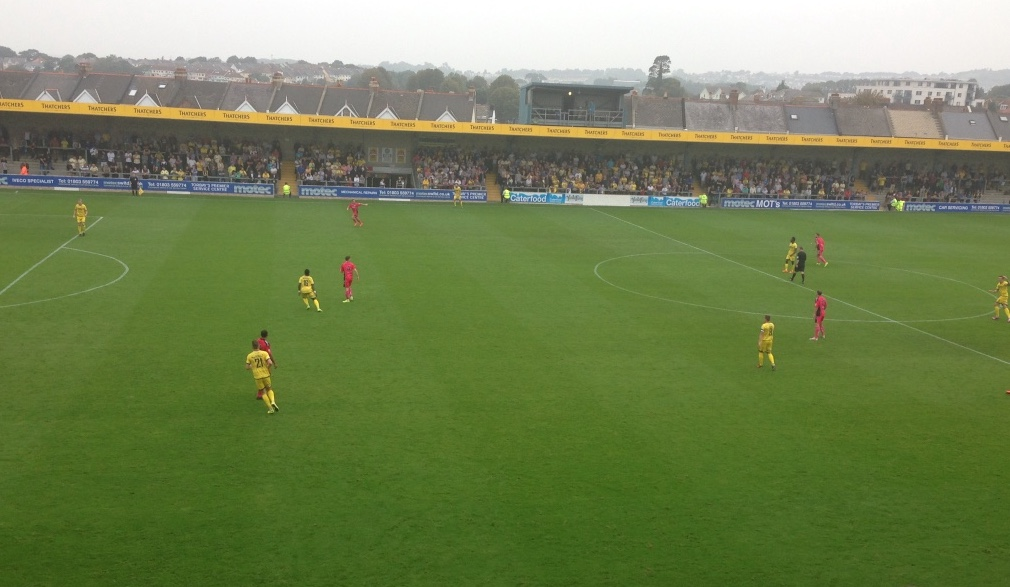
- Plainmoor, 2016
- Interactive map of Plainmoor
- Full name: Plainmoor
- Capacity: 6,200
- Surface: Grass
- Field size: 112 x 74 yards

Construction
- Built: 1921
- Opened: 1921

Tenants
- Torquay United (1921–present); Truro City (2018–2019)

Plainmoor is an association football stadium located in the Plainmoor suburb of Torquay, Devon, England. Since 1921, the stadium has been the home of Torquay United Football Club, who currently compete in the National League South, the sixth tier of English football. During the first half of the 2018-19 National League South season, the stadium also hosted Truro City games.

== History ==
At the time of Torquay United's formation in 1899, Plainmoor was the home of Torquay Athletic Rugby Football Club. In 1904, the rugby club secured the lease of the Recreation Ground, where United had been playing, and United's Torquay and District League rivals Ellacombe moved into the vacated site at Plainmoor, leaving United homeless.

In 1910, United merged with Ellacombe to become Torquay Town. Ellacombe's Plainmoor ground became the home of the new club, and the shared home of local rivals Babbacombe.

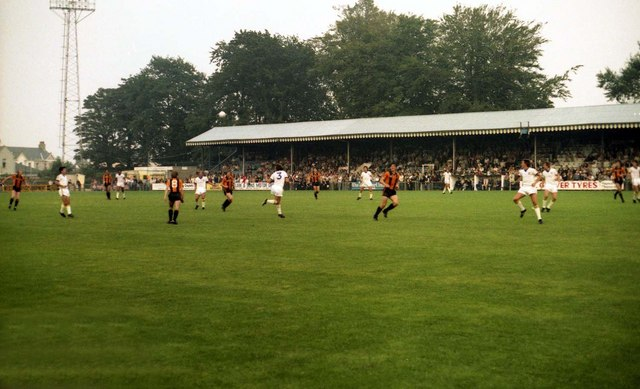
Main Stand at Plainmoor, 1981

Torquay Town and Babbacombe finally merged and became Torquay United (again) in 1921. In 1927, United were elected into Division Three South of the Football League.

A new wooden grandstand, costing £150 (around £8,958.33 today), was erected for United's inaugural season in the Football League. It had previously stood at Buckfastleigh Racecourse, where its twin can still be seen today. The roof of the stand was blown off during a gale in 1930.

Very little changed for the next 50 years as the ground saw generations of supporters move through its turnstiles. During the 1954–55 season, over 21,000 fans watched Torquay's 0–1 defeat at the hands of Huddersfield Town. The same season also saw United become one of the first lower division clubs to install floodlights at their ground.

David Webb came to Plainmoor in 1984 and prompted a few cosmetic changes to the terracing. Then on 16 May 1985, just six days after the Bradford City stadium fire, a third of the old grandstand was destroyed during an early morning blaze. Nobody was hurt, but as a result, the ground's capacity fell to below 5,000. In the few years after the fire the ground saw little change. At one point the manager's office and changing rooms were situated in a couple of portable cabins behind the old Mini Stand.

During the late 1980s and throughout the 1990s, Plainmoor finally saw some major changes. The old Mini Stand made way for the all-seated Family Stand, which houses offices, the boardroom and the club shop, as well as the pub and restaurant Boots and Laces, and the 200 Club bar.

The Cowshed, at the Ellacombe end of the ground and made out of corrugated iron and wood, was replaced by the old mini-stand, while a TV gantry sits on top of the popular side stand. Also, in time for the beginning of the 2000–01 season, the new Sparkworld Stand was opened to accommodate away fans.

The main stand, that was originally from Buckfastleigh Racecourse, was demolished in the autumn of 2011 and the ground capacity was reduced. A new stand, filling the complete length of the pitch, unlike the previous stand, was erected during the 2011–2012 season and opened in August 2012, in time for the start of the following season. It was named Bristow's Bench after the late former director, Paul Bristow, who supported the club financially after a lottery win. In December 2012, a big screen was installed between the popular side and the away end.

On 15 September 2014, Torquay United announced a four-year deal with local company Launa Windows to rename Plainmoor as "The Launa Windows Stadium", presumably in an effort to increase revenue. The stadium reverted to its traditional name in 2018.

== Future ==
The land is still owned by the local council, talks about the club purchasing the ground have taken place on several occasions in the past.

In the not-too-distant past there was some talk of re-location, but former chairman, Mike Bateson, believed that would only happen if:

- Torquay saw a multimillion-pound sale or two.
- The authorities pay the club to make way for further development of Westlands school.
- The club become League One regulars (at present in the National League South).

After ownership of Torquay United was transferred to Gaming International under the company name Riviera Stadium Limited, talks with Torbay Council re-opened about the purchase of Plainmoor and developing the ground into housing.

== Record attendance ==
- 21,908 v Huddersfield Town, FA Cup 4th Rd, 29 January 1955.
- Record away attendance - Truro City v Torquay United (2,760), National League South, 1 January 2019.
