= Torquay United F.C. =

Association football club in England

Torquay United
- Full name: Torquay United Football Club
- Nickname: The Gulls
- Founded: 1899; 127 years ago
- Ground: Plainmoor
- Capacity: 6,200 (3,092 seated)
- Chairman: Michael Westcott & Mark Bowes-Cavanagh
- Manager: Jimmy Ball
- League: National League South
- 2025–26: National League South, 3rd of 24
- Website: torquayunited.com
Home colours	Away colours	Third colours

Torquay United Football Club are a professional association football club based in Torquay, Devon, England. The team currently compete in the National League South, the sixth level of the English football league system. They have played their home matches at Plainmoor since 1921 and are nicknamed "The Gulls". The club's primary colours are yellow and blue.

Founded in 1899, the club first entered the East Devon League. They went on to win the Torquay & District League in 1908–09, the Plymouth & West Devon League 1911–12, and were admitted into the Football League in 1927 after claiming the Southern League title and second-place in the Western League in 1926–27. They remained in the Third Division South for the next 31 years and were promoted out of the Fourth Division at the end of the 1959–60 season, though were relegated after two seasons in the Third Division. Torquay were again promoted in 1965–66, only to suffer another relegation six years later. They survived re-election votes after last place finishes in the Fourth Division in 1985 and 1986.

Torquay gained promotion after winning the Fourth Division play-offs in 1991, having been losing finalists in 1988. Relegated in 1992, they lost another play-off final in 1998, before securing automatic promotion in 2003–04. They lasted just one season in League One and were relegated out of the Football League after finishing bottom of League Two in 2007. Torquay lost the 2008 FA Trophy final, but won the 2009 Conference play-off final. They spent five seasons in League Two, missing out in the play-offs in 2011 and 2012, before losing their Football League status for a second time with a last place finish in 2014. Torquay were relegated from the National League in 2018, but secured immediate promotion after winning the National League South in 2018–19. At the end of the 2022–23 season, Torquay were relegated back to the National League South and less than a year later, in April 2024, went into administration.

== History ==
=== Formation and early years (1899–1912) ===
The original Torquay United was formed in 1899 by a group of school-leavers under the guidance of Sergeant-Major Edward Tomney. The newly founded club played its inaugural match against an Upton Cricket Club XI on one of local farmer, John Wright's fields, situated at the top of Penny's Hill, on Teignmouth Road. After a season of friendlies the club joined the East Devon League and moved into the Recreation Ground, their home for the next four years. Plainmoor at the time was occupied by Torquay Athletic Rugby Club in what is a reversal of the modern day situation. In 1904 Athletic secured the lease on the Recreation Ground from United, with League rivals Ellacombe taking over the lease of Plainmoor, leaving United homeless for the first time in their existence – facilitating a return to the farmer's fields on Teignmouth Road.

However the club was on the move once more when the fields were sold to be developed into what would later be known as Parkhurst Road. United soon found another home, sharing with Torquay Cricket Club in nearby Cricketfield Road (a site still used for football in the modern day by South Devon League side Upton Athletic F.C.) for four years. It was during this time that they won their first honour; the 1909 Torquay and District League title. Following this breakthrough for the club, United merged with local rivals Ellacombe Football Club in 1910 and adopted the name Torquay Town. It was then that United finally moved into Plainmoor where they would remain to this day. During this period the ground was shared with the team's remaining local rival Babbacombe. Both sides were playing in the same league, the Plymouth and District League alongside the reserve teams of Exeter City and Plymouth Argyle, Torquay Town would later win the league in the 1911–12 season.

=== Election to the Football League (1920–1950) ===
Chart of yearly table positions of Torquay United in the Football League

In 1920 after the resumption of the Football League following the First World War, United's local rivals Plymouth Argyle and Exeter City were both elected to the Football League as founder members of the Football League Third Division, this prompted a movement in the town to merge the two remaining teams and create a new entity capable of competing at this level and being elected into the new league. After many discussions, Babbacombe at last agreed to a merger, enabling the new club to become the sole representative of the town and turn professional to further its case for league election, the new team was to be called Torquay United again.

In 1921, Torquay United moved from the Plymouth and District League to the Western League; they spent one season there, before transferring to the Southern League for the 1922–23 season. Torquay went on to finish sixth that season and during the summer applied for Football League status, but failed to gain a single vote. They remained in the Southern League until the end of the 1926–27 season. In 1925, the club reached the first round of FA Cup for the first time in the club's history. In 1927, Torquay won their first league title since the Torquay and District League of 1912, winning the western division of the Southern League.

Capitalizing on this momentum, the club once again applied for league membership and were successful this time, joining the Football League Third Division. The town of Torquay had joined Plymouth and Exeter in the football league at last. Torquay's first match in the league took place on 27 August 1927, a crowd of 11,625 watched a 1–1 draw. The team's first season in the league however, was not a success, finishing their first season in the football league bottom of the table on 30 points and with a goals against tally of 103. Though they were successfully re-elected to the league for the next season. Throughout the 1930s, Torquay struggled against financial problems, they also failed to finish higher than 10th in twelve seasons. When league football was resumed in 1946 after the Second World War, United continued to struggle and finished that season 19th.

=== Webber, O'Farrell and the glory years (1950–1970) ===
Torquay United finished 5th in 1950. In 1954 United changed their club colours again, the black and white stripes being changed to gold and blue to reflect the resort's "sun, sand and sea image", colours which the club has maintained to this day. With the change of colours came a change in fortunes starting with the club's greatest ever FA Cup moment that very season. Torquay were drawn against Leeds United, away, in the third round of the Cup. Torquay went into the game clear under-dogs, yet they managed to hold the Yorkshire club to a 2–2 draw. The following Wednesday, 12 January, Torquay beat Leeds 4–0, with a gate of 11,000. Torquay United went on to play Huddersfield Town in the fourth round FA Cup game at Plainmoor. Torquay lost 1–0 to the higher-placed Division One club, but the official attendance of 21,908 remains a club record.

Following their FA Cup heroics, in the 1956–57 season Torquay just missed out on promotion to Division Two on goal average. The season had begun well – and by April, the possibility of a first promotion to Division Two was the talk of the town. A trip to Crystal Palace for the team and over 1,500 Torquay fans travelling on the last day of the season beckoned. Torquay only needed to win the game to be certain of going up, but they managed only a 1–1 draw at Selhurst Park and Ipswich, who won their final match away to Southampton, took the title. United failed to repeat this form the following season and after finishing 22nd in the league they were placed in the new Division Four, created by the de-regionalisation of the two third level divisions. With Eric Webber still in charge, United ended their first season in the League's new basement division in twelfth place; but the next season, the club returned to form, and on 27 April 1960, 8,749 fans saw Torquay United beat Gillingham 2–0 at Plainmoor to return to the Third Division with two games of the season remaining. They were relegated on the last day of the campaign in May 1962.

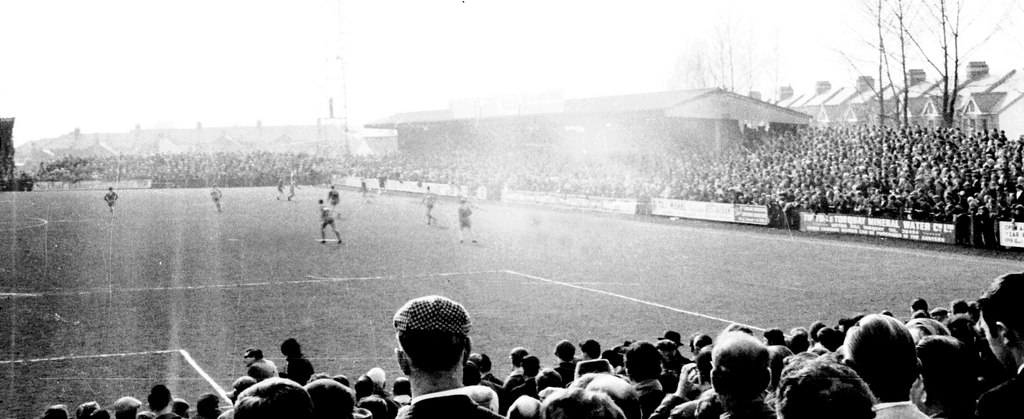
A match against Plymouth Argyle in 1968 at Plainmoor

Torquay came very close to regaining their Division Three status when they finished sixth in both the 1962–63 and 1963–64 campaigns. In 1963, Webber signed striker Robin Stubbs for a club record fee of £6,000 from Birmingham City; he went on to be the club's top goalscorer at the end of the 1963–64 scoring 24 goals in 34 games. Torquay's FA Cup run of 1964–65 was the highlight of a disappointing mid-table season as United again failed to return to the Third Division. In the third round, Torquay were drawn at home to English football giants; Tottenham Hotspur. In front of Plainmoor's second ever largest attendance, slightly above 20,000 – the team performed well, in the last few minutes, it was the turn of record signing Robin Stubbs to net two goals and make it 3–3.

The first attempt at a replay in London was cancelled, with the majority of United's travelling fans having already arrived in the capital. A week later though, in front of 55,000-strong crowd at White Hart Lane, the match went ahead. Jimmy Greaves scored a hat trick as Tottenham showed their class to win 5–1. After finishing in 12th at the end of the season, Eric Webber was finally sacked after 15 years as manager. Webber's replacement was Frank O'Farrell. In his first season in charge, O'Farrell oversaw Torquay's second promotion when they finished third in Division Four. At the end of their 1966–67 campaign United finished in seventh, and at the end of their 1967–68 season, United came very close to promotion to Division Two, once again, finishing fourth, two points behind Oxford United and Bury. This period also coincided with the club's fans being voted the 'Best Behaved Supporters in the League'. The O'Farrell era ended in 1968–69, when he left to manage First Division Leicester City and later Manchester United.

=== Lower league disappointment (1970–1988) ===
Another two seasons of indifference in Division Three saw the club finish in mid-table positions, then at the end of the 1971–72 campaign, United found themselves in the relegation zone, and back in the basement division. This led to a relatively uneventful decade with the club consistently scratching out mid-table finishes. O'Farrell made a return to Plainmoor in 1977 into the position of consultant manager, with Green taking hold of first team duties. Torquay finished in ninth place in the 1977–78 season. Green left the club in 1981, to be replaced at the helm, for the third time, by Frank O'Farrell, but O'Farrell did not stay in charge of team matters for long, bringing in ex-Scotland international Bruce Rioch to become player-coach. Torquay finished in fifteenth place in the 1981–82 season.

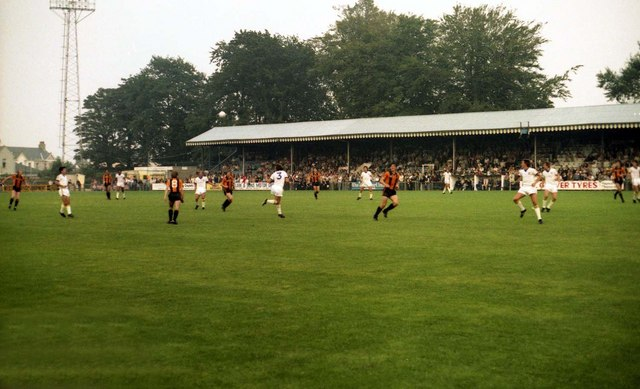
A match at Plainmoor in 1981

During the following summer Rioch was named manager, and the following 1982–83 campaign saw United finish 12th, but reached the fourth round of the FA Cup for the third time, going out of the competition at Plainmoor after a 3–2 defeat by Sheffield Wednesday. Torquay finished the season in 9th place. However, in Webb's first full season at the helm, the 1984–85 season United finished bottom of Division Four and had to apply for re-election to stay in the Football League. For the second successive year United finished bottom of Division Four, and again successfully applied for re-election. The 1986–87 season saw the club survive automatic relegation to the Football Conference by drawing their last game with a goal in injury-time, which had been added after a Torquay player was bitten by a police dog.

=== A new era and the Bateson years (1988–2008) ===
At the start of the 1987–88 season, Cyril Knowles was appointed manager. That year, Torquay beat Tottenham Hotspur 1–0 at Plainmoor in the FA Cup. The team also reached the semi-final of the Football League Trophy. In May 1988, Lee Sharpe transferred to Manchester United for £180,000, one of the biggest transfer fees in Torquay United's history. Torquay reached the final of the Football League Trophy in 1989. A crowd of 46,513 watched them lose 4–1 to Bolton Wanderers at Wembley. Under newly appointed John Impey Torquay were relegated after only one season in Division Three.

Soon after, Don O'Riordan took the senior job, guiding United to the play-offs again during the 1993–94 season, in which the club finished sixth. However, the team lost 4–1 at Deepdale in the final. At the end of the 1995–96 season, Torquay finished bottom of Division Three. However, they were saved from relegation when Stevenage Borough's ground was deemed unfit for League football. In the 1997–98 season, the club finished fifth and reached the play-offs, but lost 1–0 to Colchester United in the Wembley final. In 1999 and 2001, Torquay only narrowly avoided relegation to non-League football. Newly appointed Roy McFarland only managed to deliver a 19th-place finish the following year, subsequently stepping down. At the end of the 2003–04 season, the club won automatic promotion, but their stay in the third tier was only to last one season, and they were relegated at the end of 2004–05.

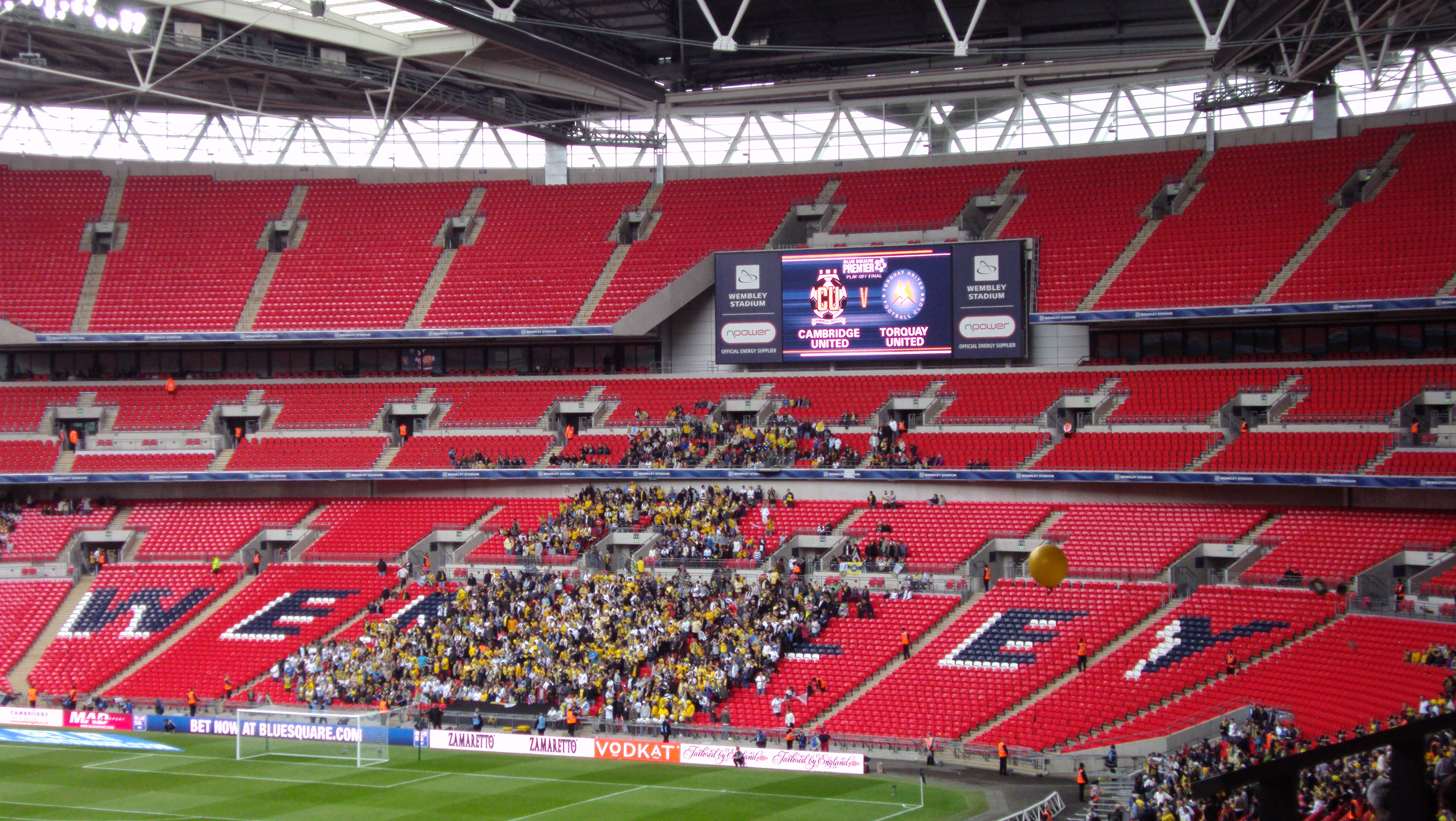
Torquay supporters at Wembley Stadium, May 2009

In the 2005–06 FA Cup 3rd round, Torquay managed a 0–0 draw with the then-Premier League side Birmingham City. However, they lost the replay 2–0 at St Andrew's. Torquay United lost their eighty-year Football League status on 14 April 2007, following a 1–1 draw at home to Peterborough United. Soon after, a £15M National Lottery winner, Paul Bristow, bought the club. Rowe was installed as the new chairman, and Paul Buckle appointed the club's new manager.

On 15 March 2008, Torquay played at Wembley for the first time in ten years to reach the FA Trophy final. Having finished third in the Conference, Torquay played fierce rivals Exeter City away in the play-offs, and Exeter won 4–0. On 10 May 2008, Torquay lost the FA Trophy final 1–0 to Ebbsfleet United at Wembley. They reached the fourth round of the FA Cup in 2008–09, playing Coventry City in front of 6,018, and lost 1–0. Torquay United were promoted to the Football League on 17 May 2009 in the play-off final at Wembley, with 35,000 in attendance.

=== From Football League to non-League (2008–present) ===
Celebratory open top bus tour following 2009 promotion back to the Football League

In their first season back in League Two, Torquay finished in 17th place and the club reached the third round of the 2009–10 FA Cup, where they lost 1–0 to Brighton & Hove Albion. The next season, Torquay United reached the fourth round, equaling the club record. That season, Torquay came 7th but they lost 1–0 in the play off final to Stevenage and remained in League Two. United enjoyed an even more successful season in 2011–12 under new manager Martin Ling, achieving a record high of second place in League Two. However, they lost 4–1 on aggregate to Cheltenham Town in the play-off semi-finals.

The club was relegated to the Conference Premier in 2013–14. Torquay finished 13th in their first season back in non-League. In June 2015, ownership of the club was taken up by a new consortium made up of ten local business people. Paul Cox was appointed as manager but left Torquay three months later. Shortly afterward, United suffered their biggest defeat in 20 years, losing 7–3 at home to Bromley. On 28 September 2015, the club announced Kevin Nicholson would be the new player-manager. During 2016–17, a deal with a Swindon-based gaming and leisure company, Gaming international, was agreed and confirmed by the National League in March 2017.

On 21 April 2018, Torquay were relegated to the sixth tier of English football for the first time. Soon after, Gary Johnson was appointed manager. They were crowned champions of the National League South on 13 April 2019, their first league championship title since 1927. In 2019–20, Torquay finished 14th in the fifth tier after the season was cancelled in March 2020 due to disruption caused by the COVID-19 pandemic. In 2020–21, the Gulls finished second. In the play-off final at Ashton Gate, Torquay's goalkeeper Lucas Covolan equalised in the 95th minute. However, Torquay lost out to Hartlepool United 5–4 on penalties. Two years later, Torquay were relegated back to the National League South.

==== Administration & Bryn Consortium Takeover (2024–) ====
On 22 February 2024, club chairman, Clarke Osborne, stated he was planning to appoint administrators and stood down. On 30 June 2023, the Gulls lost £1,163,124 and Osborne's loans to the club rose to £5.28m. After announcing likely administration, manager Gary Johnson left the club by mutual agreement and his assistant Aaron Downes was appointed interim manager. On 13 March 2024, the National League deducted Torquay ten points, dropping the club from 12th to 17th place in the table.

The club formally went into administration on 5 April 2024. On 12 April 2024, Torquay was deducted a further point for fielding a suspended player, dropping the club to 19th with three games to play. Torquay finished the 2023–24 season 18th in the sixth tier, their lowest league finish since 1927. Off the pitch, a consortium of local businessmen, the Bryn Consortium, was set to take over the club. On 14 May 2024, Torquay appointed former Truro City boss Paul Wotton as their new manager, working with football advisor Neil Warnock.

The club was no longer in administration by 25 April 2025.

== Crest and colours ==
=== Crest ===
Torquay United's first crest, based on the town's coat of arms

The gull's wings crest design of 1986–2017

Torquay's initial crest was based heavily on the town's coat of arms, featuring a three-masted ship, to represent the region's longstanding association with shipping, it also displayed a castled gateway and the golden wings were to represent wings of the local seagulls. The crest remained in use until the mid eighties, with one change in the 1970s to incorporate the 'gulls wings' emblem which is familiar today. That meant, however, that the three-masted ship was removed from the design.

During an unsuccessful spell on the pitch during the 1980s, during which time the club finished bottom of the Football League system twice, the emblem was switched to a circular design incorporating two palm trees. In 1986, the club chose to go back to the gull emblem, encircled by the club name. In the years that followed multiple versions of this crest were produced, so in 2017 the badge was refreshed to 'unify' these multiple versions and produce a cleaner, more modern design.

=== Colours ===
Torquay United went through various team colours before settling on the familiar yellow and blue of today. In the club's formative days they played in a light and dark blue kit, before switching to a black and white striped kit reminiscent of a modern-day Newcastle United kit. This identity change led to the club being dubbed 'the magpies'. The magpies played in this colour scheme until the club opted for a fresh identity In 1954. United based their new image around the town's traditional seaside character and they chose a more distinctive yellow, or gold and blue kit. The new colours were chosen to represent the area's golden sands and blue sky and sea. For the majority of the years since this change the club has worn these colours in varying styles, currently favouring a predominantly yellow shirt with blue trim. The switch from black and white also heralded the birth of a new nickname 'The Gulls'.

== Stadium ==
=== Early years and Plainmoor ===
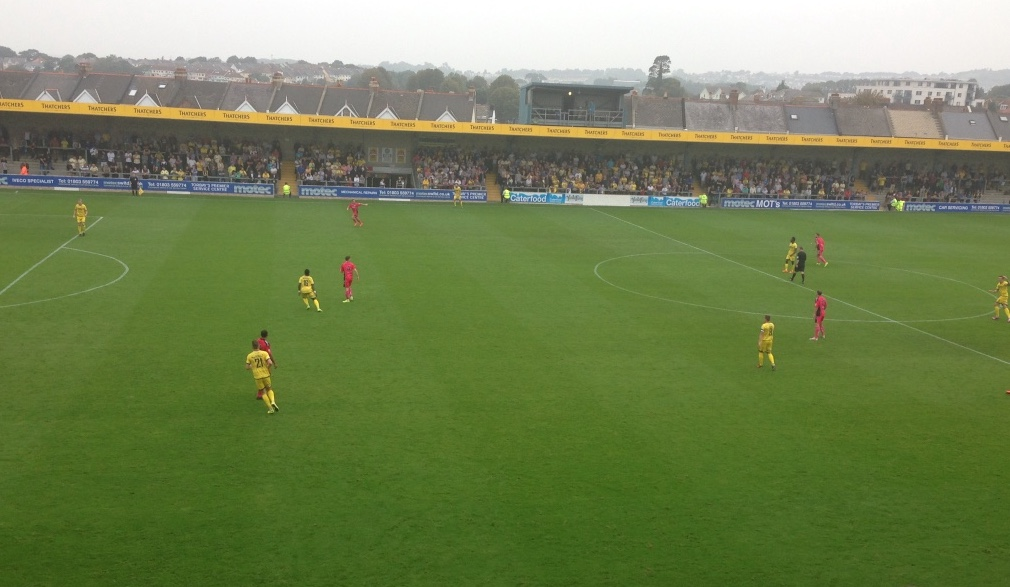
View of The Popular Side from Bristow's Bench

United played their first game, a friendly, against an Upton Cricket Club XI on one of farmer John Wright's fields, which was situated at the top of Penny's Hill, on Teignmouth Road. After a season of friendlies the club joined the East Devon League and moved to the Recreation Ground, which was to be their home for the following four years. In 1904 Torquay Athletic Rugby Football Club secured the lease of the Recreation Ground (it remains their home today) and United moved back to the Teignmouth Road site, but again was forced to move when the field was sold to developers to build Parkhurst Road. At the time Torquay Cricket Club were located nearby in Cricketfield Road, and so this site was United's next home.

The club remained in Cricketfield Road for four years. In 1910 United merged with Ellacombe to become Torquay Town. Ellacombe's Plainmoor ground became the home of the new club, and the shared home of local rivals Babbacombe. Torquay Town and Babbacome finally merged and became Torquay United (again) in 1921. The club has remained at Plainmoor ever since. On 17 May 1985, a fire swept through the then fifty-year-old main stand 'The Grandstand', just six days after a fire at Valley Parade Stadium in Bradford, in which over fifty people lost their lives. This incident occurred in the early hours of the morning, and nobody was injured. After initially suspecting that this could have been a copycat arson of the Bradford City stadium fire, eventual cause was attributed to an electrical fault, the ground's capacity fell to below 5,000.

Throughout the late eighties and early nineties the infrastructure at the ground was given a major overhaul, with the mini stand at the home end of the ground being redeveloped. In its place is now the family stand – a covered, all seater stand with board rooms, a club shop, restaurant and club bar. After this was completed attention turned to redevelopment of the 'popular side', which was fully covered and updated to modern-day standards. In 2000–01 the away end was also redeveloped with a new covered standing area. The old wooden grandstand, initially costing £150 and erected at Plainmoor for United's inaugural season in the Football League stood until 2011. Prior to its time at Plainmoor the stand had previously stood at Buckfastleigh Racecourse. It was demolished to create a new stand built in 2012 named Bristow's Bench in memory of the late Paul Bristow.

=== Possible move ===
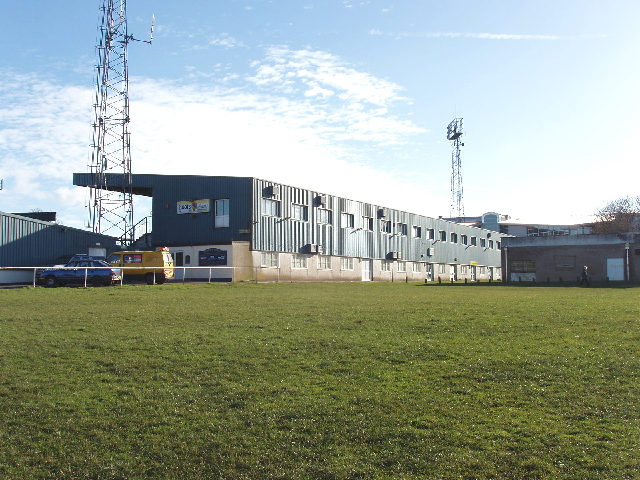
Outside view of Plainmoor behind the family stand

Following his takeover of the club in October 2006, chairman Chris Roberts went on record stating his desire to move the club to a new multipurpose stadium catering for football, rugby and athletics. Speculation placed the site of the new complex at the Torquay Recreation Ground, currently occupied by Torquay Athletic Rugby Club. Since Roberts' resignation this move has become unlikely, with succeeding chairman Alex Rowe distancing himself from the plans saying that the club and the fans wish to remain at Plainmoor and will build upon the current ground to increase capacity. The club are looking to buy the houses behind the away end and building an extension to the away end and also to acquire the nearby school (Westlands) and build a bigger grandstand to increase the capacity to around 9,000.

Plans for an extended grandstand were submitted to the council for planning permission, in co-operation with Westlands school in 2010. This was approved on 9 June 2011 with the increased cost believed to be approximately £2 million with the new structure to be named "Bristow's Bench" in memory of the late Paul Bristow, who essentially underwrote the Gulls' return to the football league. With the demolition of the old Grandstand and the new stand not being ready for the 2011–12 season Plainmoor capacity stood at 4,500 for the 2011–12 season. It was however ready in time for the start of the 2012–13 season where it witnessed its first sell out crowd with the visit of Devon neighbours Plymouth Argyle in early September.

Rumours of a potential move away from Plainmoor resurfaced following the takeover of the club by Gaming International. The club's new owners were keen to relocate the stadium facilities and incorporate football into a new multi-use complex in Torbay, developing the existing Plainmoor site for housing. However plans have proved controversial with United fans, and further certainty has been called for. This led to a decision in 2017 to postpone talks between Torbay Council and GI over the purchase of the freehold.

== Players ==
=== Current squad ===
As of 20th November 2026

Note: Flags indicate national team as defined under FIFA eligibility rules; some limited exceptions apply. Players may hold more than one non-FIFA nationality.

No.	Pos.	Nation	Player
1	GK	ENG	Toby Savin
2	DF	ENG	Dom Bernard
3	DF	ENG	Tyler Hill
4	DF	ENG	Jordan Dyer
5	DF	VGB	Taylor Scarff
9	FW	ENG	Cody Cooke
10	MF	SCO	Sonny Blu Lo-Everton
11	MF	ENG	Jacob Beaumont-Clark
12	DF	ENG	Harry Shield
13	GK	ENG	Zak Baker
14	FW	GUY	Deon Moore
15	DF	WAL	Kian Jenkins

No.	Pos.	Nation	Player
16	DF	ENG	Jake Wannell
17	MF	BLZ	Angelo Cappello
18	MF	ENG	Matt Worthington
20	MF	ENG	Dan Hayfield
21	DF	ENG	Oludare Olufunwa
22	FW	ENG	Tegan Finn (on loan from Plymouth Argyle)
23	FW	ENG	Sean Robertson
24	MF	ENG	Caleb Roberts (on loan from Plymouth Argyle)
26	DF	ENG	Cole McGhee (on loan from Sheffield Wednesday)
27	MF	ENG	Matt Jay
39	FW	ENG	Callum Morton

=== Out on Loan ===
Note: Flags indicate national team as defined under FIFA eligibility rules; some limited exceptions apply. Players may hold more than one non-FIFA nationality.

No.	Pos.	Nation	Player
19	FW	GER	Isaac Westendorf (on loan to Oxford City until January 2027)

=== Notable former players ===
Nat	Name	Years	From	Apps	Goals	Joined
(England)	Robin Stubbs	1963–1969, 1972–1974	Birmingham City	263	133	Bristol Rovers
(England)	Lee Sharpe	1987–1988	-	14	3	Manchester United
(England)	Justin Fashanu	1991–1993	Newcastle United	41	15	Airdrieonians
(Saint Vincent and the Grenadines)	Rodney Jack	1995–1998	Lambada (Barbados)	93	27	Crewe Alexandra
(Wales)	Neville Southall	1998–2000	Doncaster Rovers	53	0	Bradford City
(England)	Chris Waddle	2000–2002	Burnley	7	0	Worksop Town
(England)	Liam Rosenior	2004–2004	Fulham (loan)	10	0	Fulham (return)
(England)	Adebayo Akinfenwa	2004–2005	Doncaster Rovers	37	14	Swansea City
(Northern Ireland)	Eunan O'Kane	2010–2012	Coleraine	106	12	AFC Bournemouth

== Management ==
=== Coaching ===
Position	Name
Manager	Jimmy Ball
Assistant Manager	Darren Way
1st Team Coach	Ryan Perks
Goalkeeper Coach	Ken Griffiths
Head of Medical	Regan Miles
Physiotherapist	Graham McAnuff
Club Doctor	Dr. Vivek Kulkarni
Video Analyst	Louie Birkenshaw
Football Advisor	Neil Warnock
Head of Youth	Matt Jay
Head of Development	Matt Anthony

=== Managerial history ===
As of 21st November 2026

Years	Manager	Win %
1921–1924	(England) Crad Evans	51.92
1924	(England) Harry Raymond	31.25
1924–1925	(England) Fred Mortimer	20.00
1925–1929	(South Africa) Percy Mackrill	43.18
1929	Unknown	28.57
1929–1932	(England) Frank Womack	31.06
1932–1938	(England) Frank Brown	33.33
1938–1940	(England) Alf Steward	37.50
1945–1946	(England) Billy Butler	0.00
1946–1947	(England) Jack Butler	34.88
1947–1950	(Scotland) Johnny McNeil	40.77
1950	(Wales) Bob John	22.22
1950–1951	(Scotland) Alex Massie	23.81
1951–1965	(England) Eric Webber	40.44
1965–1968	(Republic of Ireland) Frank O'Farrell	44.63
1969–1971	(Scotland) Allan Brown	35.71
1971–1973	(Wales) Jack Edwards	26.47
1973–1976	(England) Malcolm Musgrove	32.45
1976	(England) Lew Chatterley	0.00
1976–1977	(Republic of Ireland) Frank O'Farrell	28.57
1977–1981	(England) Mike Green	37.10
1981–1982	(Republic of Ireland) Frank O'Farrell	26.42
1982–1984	(Scotland) Bruce Rioch	37.21
1984	(England) Jimmy Hargreaves	50.00
1984–1985	(England) David Webb	26.67
1985	(England) John Sims	12.50
1985–1987	(Wales) Stuart Morgan	20.83
1987–1989	(England) Cyril Knowles	41.35
1989–1991	(Scotland) Dave Smith	37.78

Years	Manager	Win %
1991	(England) John Impey	35.71
1991–1992	(England) Wes Saunders	30.43
1992	(Serbia) Ivan Golac	26.32
1992–1993	(England) Paul Compton	25.71
1993	(England) Neil Warnock	33.33
1993–1995	(Republic of Ireland) Don O'Riordan	31.15
1995–1996	(England) Eddie May	9.38
1996–1998	(England) Kevin Hodges	35.51
1998–2001	(England) Wes Saunders	31.54
2001	(England) Colin Lee	33.33
2001–2002	(England) Roy McFarland	26.00
2002–2006	(England) Leroy Rosenior	32.07
2006	(Wales) John Cornforth	33.33
2006	(England) Ian Atkins	32.14
2006–2007	(Czech Republic) Luboš Kubík	13.33
2007	(England) Keith Curle	13.33
2007–2011	(England) Paul Buckle	46.02
2011–2013	(England) Martin Ling	39.51
2013	(England) Shaun Taylor	16.67
2013–2014	(Wales) Alan Knill	21.95
2014–2015	(England) Chris Hargreaves	36.00
2015	(England) Paul Cox	20.00
2015–2017	(England) Kevin Nicholson	30.11
2017–2018	(England) Gary Owers	26.67
2018–2024	(England) Gary Johnson	45.41
2024	(Australia) Aaron Downes	38.46
2024–2026	(England) Paul Wotton	50.57
2026	(England) Neil Warnock	50.00
2026–present	(England) Jimmy Ball	46.67

== Records and statistics ==
- Highest ever league position: 2nd in Third Division South (level 3, what is now League 1), (Note: Prior to league re-structuring) 1956–57
- Best FA Cup performance: Fourth round, 1948–49, 1954–55, 1970–71, 1982–83, 1989–90, 2008–09, 2010–11
- Best League Cup performance: Third round, 1967–68, 1971–72, 1975–76, 1976–77
- Best League Trophy performance: Finalists, 1988–89
- Best FA Trophy performance: Runners-up, 2007–08
- Record home attendance: 21,908 vs Huddersfield Town, FA Cup fourth round, 29 January 1955
- Biggest victory: 9–0 vs Swindon Town, Football League Third Division South, 8 March 1952
- Heaviest defeat: 2–10 vs Fulham, Football League Division Three South, 7 September 1931
- Most appearances: Dennis Lewis, 442 (1947–1959)
- Most goals: Sammy Collins, 219 (1948–1958)

Notable purchases

- Leon Constantine from Peterborough United for £75,000 in December 2004 (current club record)
- Billy Bodin from Swindon Town for £70,000 in July 2012
- Eifion Williams from Barry Town for £70,000 in March 1999 (previous club record)
- Robin Stubbs from Birmingham City for £6,000 in 1963 (previous club record)

Notable sales

- Rodney Jack to Crewe Alexandra for £650,000 in July 1998 (current club record)
- Matthew Gregg to Crystal Palace for £400,000 in October 1998
- David Graham to Wigan Athletic for £315,000 in August 2004
- Bobby Olejnik to Peterborough United for £300,000 in June 2012
- Lee Sharpe to Manchester United for £185,000 in May 1988 (previous club record)
- Eunan O'Kane to AFC Bournemouth for £175,000 in July 2012
- Angus MacDonald to Barnsley for £100,000 in August 2016
- Mark Ellis to Crewe Alexandra for £80,000 in June 2012
- Colin Lee to Tottenham Hotspur for £60,000 in the 1978–79 season (previous club record)

== Honours ==
League

- Fourth Division / Third Division (level 4)
  - Promoted: 1959–60, 1965–66, 2003–04
  - Play-off winners: 1991
- Conference (level 5)
  - Play-off winners: 2009
- National League South (level 6)
  - Champions: 2018–19
- Southern League (Western Division)
  - Champions: 1926–27

Cup

- Associate Members' Cup
  - Runners-up: 1988–89
- FA Trophy
  - Runners-up: 2007–08
- Devon Senior Cup
  - Winners: 1910–11, 1921–22
