= 2003–04 Northampton Town F.C. season =

Northampton Town
2003–04 season
- Chairman: David Cardoza
- Manager: Martin Wilkinson (until 29 September); Colin Calderwood (from 9 October)
- Stadium: Sixfields Stadium
- Division Three: 6th
- Play-offs: Semi-final
- FA Cup: Fourth round
- League Cup: Second round
- League Trophy: Semi-final
- Top goalscorer: League: Martin Smith (11); All: Martin Smith (15)
- Highest home attendance: 7,356 vs Manchester United
- Lowest home attendance: 3,948 vs Weston-super-Mare

The 2003–04 season was Northampton Town's 107th season in their history and the first season back in the Third Division after relegation the previous year. Alongside competing in Division Three, the club also participated in the FA Cup, League Cup and Football League Trophy.

== Players ==
As of match played 20 May 2004.

| No. | Name | Position | Nat. | Place of Birth | Date of Birth (Age) | Apps | Goals | Previous club | Date signed | Fee |
Goalkeepers
| 1 | Glyn Thompson | GK | (England) | Telford | 24 February 1981 (aged 23) | 21 | 0 | Fulham | 27 March 2003 | Free |
| 21 | Lee Harper | GK | (England) | Chelsea | 30 October 1971 (aged 32) | 84 | 0 | Walsall | 15 July 2002 | Free |
| 23 | Luke Weaver | GK | (England) | Woolwich | 26 June 1979 (aged 24) | 0 | 0 | Carlisle United | 1 July 2003 | Free |
| – | Mark Bunn | GK | (England) | Kettering | 16 November 1984 (aged 19) | 0 | 0 | Apprentice | 21 August 2001 | N/A |
Defenders
| 2 | Luke Chambers | RB | (England) | Kettering | 28 September 1985 (aged 18) | 30 | 0 | Apprentice | 26 April 2003 | N/A |
| 3 | Peter Clark | LB | (England) | Romford | 10 December 1979 (aged 24) | 6 | 0 | Stockport County | 3 June 2003 | Nominal |
| 4 | Ashley Westwood | CB | (England) | Bridgnorth | 31 August 1976 (aged 27) | 11 | 0 | Sheffield Wednesday | 14 July 2003 | Free |
| 5 | Chris Willmott | CB | (England) | Bedford | 30 September 1977 (aged 26) | 47 | 1 | Wimbledon | 14 July 2003 | Free |
| 6 | Paul Reid | CB | (England) | Carlisle | 18 February 1982 (aged 22) | 61 | 2 | Rangers | 3 June 2003 | £150,000 |
| 12 | Rob Ullathorne | LB | (England) | Wakefield | 11 October 1971 (aged 32) | 15 | 1 | Sheffield United | 20 February 2004 | Free |
| 14 | Ian Sampson | CB | (England) | Wakefield | 14 November 1968 (aged 35) | 449 | 31 | Sunderland | 5 August 1994 | £30,000 |
| 24 | Chris Carruthers | LB | (England) | Kettering | 19 August 1983 (aged 20) | 86 | 1 | Apprentice | 1 August 2000 | N/A |
| 30 | Des Lyttle | RB | (England) | Wolverhampton | 24 September 1971 (aged 32) | 36 | 0 | West Bromwich Albion | 4 November 2003 | Free |
Midfielders
| 7 | Martin Reeves | CM | (England) | Birmingham | 7 September 1981 (aged 22) | 21 | 0 | Leicester City | 7 June 2003 | Free |
| 10 | Josh Low | RW | (Wales) | Bristol (ENG) | 15 February 1979 (aged 25) | 40 | 6 | Oldham Athletic | 30 July 2003 | £165,000 |
| 11 | Paul Trollope | CM | (Wales) | Swindon (ENG) | 3 June 1972 (aged 31) | 101 | 8 | Coventry City | 23 July 2002 | Free |
| 16 | Ryan Amoo | U | (England) | Leicester | 11 October 1983 (aged 20) | 1 | 0 | Aston Villa | 23 March 2004 | Free |
| 17 | Greg Lincoln | CM | (England) | Cheshunt | 23 March 1980 (aged 24) | 22 | 1 | Margate | 6 June 2002 | Free |
| 19 | Martin Smith | LM | (England) | Sunderland | 13 November 1974 (aged 29) | 56 | 15 | Huddersfield Town | 1 July 2003 | Free |
| 20 | Chris Hargreaves | CM | (England) | Cleethorpes | 12 May 1972 (aged 32) | 175 | 11 | Plymouth Argyle | 27 June 2000 | Free |
| 22 | David Hicks | CM | (England) | Enfield | 13 November 1985 (aged 18) | 0 | 0 | Tottenham Hotspur | 24 February 2004 | Free |
Forwards
| 8 | Tom Youngs | FW | (England) | Bury St Edmunds | 31 August 1979 (aged 24) | 19 | 0 | Cambridge United | 15 March 2003 | £50,000 |
| 9 | Marc Richards | FW | (England) | Wolverhampton | 8 July 1982 (aged 21) | 51 | 12 | Blackburn Rovers | 14 June 2003 | Free |
| 18 | Éric Sabin | FW | (France) | Sarcelles | 22 August 1975 (aged 28) | 13 | 5 | Queens Park Rangers | 13 March 2004 | Free |
| 25 | Derek Asamoah | FW | (Ghana) | Accra | 1 May 1981 (aged 23) | 132 | 13 | Slough Town | 25 July 2001 | Free |
| 26 | Steve Morison | FW | (England) | Enfield | 29 August 1983 (aged 20) | 21 | 2 | Apprentice | 27 August 2001 | N/A |
| 40 | John Taylor | FW | (England) | Norwich | 24 October 1964 (aged 39) | 10 | 1 | Cambridge United | 25 March 2004 | Free |

== Competitions ==
=== Football League Division Three ===
==== League table ====
| Pos | Team | Pld | W | D | L | GF | GA | GD | Pts | Promotion or relegation |
|---|---|---|---|---|---|---|---|---|---|---|
| 4 | Huddersfield Town (O, P) | 46 | 23 | 12 | 11 | 68 | 52 | +16 | 81 | Qualification for the Third Division play-offs |
| 5 | Mansfield Town | 46 | 22 | 9 | 15 | 76 | 62 | +14 | 75 | Qualification for the Third Division play-offs |
| 6 | Northampton Town | 46 | 22 | 9 | 15 | 58 | 51 | +7 | 75 | Qualification for the Third Division play-offs |
| 7 | Lincoln City | 46 | 19 | 17 | 10 | 68 | 47 | +21 | 74 | Qualification for the Third Division play-offs |
| 8 | Yeovil Town | 46 | 23 | 5 | 18 | 70 | 57 | +13 | 74 | |

Rules for classification: In the Football League goals scored (GF) takes precedence over goal difference (GD).
(O) Play-off winners; (P) Promoted

==== Results summary ====
| Overall | | | | | | | | Home | | | | | | Away | | | | | |
| Pld | W | D | L | GF | GA | GD | Pts | W | D | L | GF | GA | GD | W | D | L | GF | GA | GD |
|---|---|---|---|---|---|---|---|---|---|---|---|---|---|---|---|---|---|---|---|
| 46 | 22 | 9 | 15 | 58 | 51 | +7 | 75 | 13 | 4 | 6 | 30 | 23 | +7 | 9 | 5 | 9 | 28 | 28 | 0 |

Source: https://www.11v11.com/teams/northampton-town/tab/leagueTables/2004/ 11v11.com

==== League position by match ====
| Round | 1 | 2 | 3 | 4 | 5 | 6 | 7 | 8 | 9 | 10 | 11 | 12 | 13 | 14 | 15 | 16 | 17 | 18 | 19 | 20 | 21 | 22 | 23 | 24 | 25 | 26 | 27 | 28 | 29 | 30 | 31 | 32 | 33 | 34 | 35 | 36 | 37 | 38 | 39 | 40 | 41 | 42 | 43 | 44 | 45 | 46 |
|---|---|---|---|---|---|---|---|---|---|---|---|---|---|---|---|---|---|---|---|---|---|---|---|---|---|---|---|---|---|---|---|---|---|---|---|---|---|---|---|---|---|---|---|---|---|---|
| Ground | H | A | H | A | H | A | A | H | H | A | A | H | A | H | H | A | A | H | A | H | A | H | A | H | A | H | A | H | H | H | A | A | H | A | A | H | A | A | H | A | H | H | H | A | H | A |
| Result | L | L | W | W | W | L | L | W | D | L | D | L | D | D | L | D | W | W | L | L | D | L | W | W | L | W | L | W | W | W | W | L | W | L | W | W | D | W | W | W | D | D | L | W | W | W |
| Position | 19 | 20 | 13 | 9 | 5 | 6 | 14 | 11 | 10 | 16 | 15 | 17 | 18 | 15 | 19 | 19 | 18 | 16 | 16 | 17 | 17 | 17 | 14 | 13 | 17 | 14 | 16 | 13 | 12 | 9 | 9 | 9 | 9 | 10 | 9 | 9 | 9 | 9 | 9 | 8 | 8 | 8 | 9 | 8 | 7 | 6 |

Source: Northampton Town F.C.
A = Away; H = Home; W = Win; D = Draw; L = Loss

==== Matches ====
Win Draw Loss

| 9 August 2003 1 | Northampton Town | 0–1 | Torquay United | Northampton |
| 15:00 BST | | Report | J.Fowler 62' | Stadium: Sixfields Stadium; Attendance: 5,675; Referee: Lee Probert |

| 16 August 2003 2 | York City | 1–0 | Northampton Town | York |
| 15:00 BST | L.Nogan 44' | Report | | Stadium: Bootham Crescent; Attendance: 3,870; Referee: Mike Pike |

| 22 August 2003 3 | Northampton Town | 1–0 | Darlington | Northampton |
| 19:45 BST | M.Smith 43' | Report | | Stadium: Sixfields Stadium; Attendance: 5,020; Referee: Steve Tanner |

| 25 August 2003 4 | Yeovil Town | 0–2 | Northampton Town | Yeovil |
| 15:00 BST | | Report | P.Reid 5'; J.Low 41' | Stadium: Huish Park; Attendance: 6,105; Referee: Steve Tomlin |

| 30 August 2003 5 | Northampton Town | 1–0 | Doncaster Rovers | Northampton |
| 15:00 BST | L.Dudfield 76' | Report | | Stadium: Sixfields Stadium; Attendance: 4,933; Referee: Clive Penton |

| 5 September 2003 6 | Cheltenham Town | 4–3 | Northampton Town | Cheltenham |
| 19:45 BST | B.Taylor 56'; R.Forsyth 76', 90'; M.Devaney 90' | Report | L.Dudfield 24', 32'; M.Smith 73' | Stadium: Whaddon Road; Attendance: 5,002; Referee: Trevor Kettle |

| 13 September 2003 7 | Huddersfield Town | 3–0 | Northampton Town | Huddersfield |
| 15:00 BST | J.Stead 17', 35'; T.Carss 33' | Report | | Stadium: Galpharm Stadium; Attendance: 8,285; Referee: Anthony Leake |

| 16 September 2003 8 | Northampton Town | 2–0 | Carlisle United | Northampton |
| 19:45 BST | M.Smith 58'; P.Trollope 77' | Report | | Stadium: Sixfields Stadium; Attendance: 4,156; Referee: Grant Hegley |

| 20 September 2003 9 | Northampton Town | 0–0 | Macclesfield Town | Northampton |
| 15:00 BST | | Report | | Stadium: Sixfields Stadium; Attendance: 4,332; Referee: Alan Butler |

| 27 September 2003 10 | Oxford United | 3–0 | Northampton Town | Oxford |
| 15:00 BST | S.Basham 1', 41'; D.Whitehead 32' | Report | | Stadium: Kassam Stadium; Attendance: 6,518; Referee: Nigel Miller |

| 30 September 2003 11 | Lincoln City | 0–0 | Northampton Town | Lincoln |
| 19:45 BST | | Report | | Stadium: Sincil Bank; Attendance: 3,928; Referee: Brian Curson |

| 4 October 2003 12 | Northampton Town | 1–5 | Hull City | Northampton |
| 15:00 BST | L.Harper (red card) 70'; P.Trollope 78' | Report | S.Elliott 20'; D.Allsopp 42'; J.Price 67'; B.Burgess 82'; J.Forrester 90' | Stadium: Sixfields Stadium; Attendance: 6,011; Referee: Martin Atkinson |

| 11 October 2003 13 | Rochdale | 1–1 | Northampton Town | Rochdale |
| 15:00 BST | K.Townson 72' | Report | M.Smith 51' | Stadium: Spotland; Attendance: 2,710; Referee: Colin Webster |

| 17 October 2003 14 | Northampton Town | 1–1 | Scunthorpe United | Northampton |
| 19:45 BST | M.Smith 9' | Report | R.Kell 52' | Stadium: Sixfields Stadium; Attendance: 4,827; Referee: Lee Cable |

| 21 October 2003 15 | Northampton Town | 0–1 | Kiddermister | Northampton |
| 19:45 BST | | Report | S.Parrish 22' | Stadium: Sixfields Stadium; Attendance: 4,089; Referee: Graham Salisbury |

| 25 October 2003 16 | Leyton Orient | 1–1 | Northampton Town | Leyton, London |
| 15:00 BST | G.Alexander 89' | Report | J.Low 59' | Stadium: Brisbane Road; Attendance: 4,130; Referee: Paul Robinson |

| 1 November 2003 17 | Southend United | 0–1 | Northampton Town | Southend-on-Sea |
| 15:00 GMT | K.Maher (red card) 90' | Report | P.Trollope 60' | Stadium: Roots Hall; Attendance: 5,085; Referee: Joe Ross |

| 17 November 2003 18 | Northampton Town | 2–1 | Swansea City | Northampton |
| 19:45 GMT | R.Walker 44'; M.Smith 58' | Report | L.Britton 48' | Stadium: Sixfields Stadium; Attendance: 4,010; Referee: Phil Crossley |

| 22 November 2003 19 | Bury | 1–0 | Northampton Town | Bury |
| 15:00 GMT | J.O'Neill 72' | Report | | Stadium: Gigg Lane; Attendance: 2,683; Referee: Mark Clattenburg |

| 29 November 2003 20 | Northampton Town | 0–3 | Mansfield | Northampton |
| 15:00 GMT | | Report | I.Christie 5'; L.Lawrence 66' (pen.); C.Disley 80' | Stadium: Sixfields Stadium; Attendance: 5,019; Referee: Rob Styles |

| 13 December 2003 21 | Boston United | 1–1 | Northampton Town | Boston |
| 15:00 GMT | L.Thompson 38' | Report | G.Lincoln 33' | Stadium: York Street; Attendance: 2,756; Referee: Mark Cowburn |

| 19 December 2003 22 | Northampton Town | 1–2 | Cambridge United | Northampton |
| 19:45 GMT | C.Willmott (red card) 27'; D.Asamoah 72' | Report | L.Guttridge 28' (pen.); A.Tann 88' | Stadium: Sixfields Stadium; Attendance: 4,910; Referee: Howard Webb |

| 26 December 2003 23 | Bristol Rovers | 1–2 | Northampton Town | Bristol |
| 15:00 GMT | W.Carlisle 47' (pen.) | Report | D.Asamoah 75'; R.Walker 86' | Stadium: Memorial Stadium; Attendance: 7,695; Referee: Phil Prosser |

| 28 December 2003 24 | Northampton Town | 1–0 | Cheltenham Town | Northampton |
| 15:00 GMT | R.Walker 10' | Report | | Stadium: Sixfields Stadium; Attendance: 5,118; Referee: Alan Kaye |

| 10 January 2004 25 | Torquay United | 3–1 | Northampton Town | Torquay |
| 15:00 GMT | J.Kuffour 12'; L.Canoville 40'; C.Taylor 78' | Report | I.Sampson 55' | Stadium: Plainmoor; Attendance: 2,585; Referee: Paul Armstrong |

| 17 January 2004 26 | Northampton Town | 2–1 | York City | Northampton |
| 15:00 GMT | R.Walker 20'; J.Parkin 45' (o.g.) | Report | L.Bullock 90' | Stadium: Sixfields Stadium; Attendance: 5,003; Referee: Scott Mathieson |

| 30 January 2004 27 | Doncaster Rovers | 1–0 | Northampton Town | Doncaster |
| 19:45 GMT | P.Green 8' | Report | | Stadium: Belle Vue; Attendance: 6,017; Referee: David Pugh |

| 3 February 2004 28 | Northampton Town | 2–0 | Yeovil Town | Northampton |
| 19:45 GMT | C.Hargreaves 58'; M.Smith 70' | Report | | Stadium: Sixfields Stadium; Attendance: 4,363; Referee: Mike Thorpe |

| 7 February 2004 29 | Northampton Town | 2–0 | Bristol Rovers | Northampton |
| 15:00 GMT | M.Vieira 31'; M.Smith 77' | Report | | Stadium: Sixfields Stadium; Attendance: 5,068; Referee: Andy Penn |

| 14 February 2004 30 | Northampton Town | 3–1 | Rochdale | Northampton |
| 15:00 GMT | C.Hargreaves 69'; P.Reid 80'; M.Vieira 86' | Report | K.Townson 32' | Stadium: Sixfields Stadium; Attendance: 4,540; Referee: Ray Olivier |

| 17 February 2004 31 | Darlington | 1–2 | Northampton Town | Darlington |
| 19:45 GMT | C.Willmott 47' (o.g.) | Report | M.Smith 75'; M.Richards 76' | Stadium: The Darlington Arena; Attendance: 4,764; Referee: Kevin Wright |

| 21 February 2004 32 | Scunthorpe United | 1–0 | Northampton Town | Scunthorpe |
| 15:00 GMT | L.Ridley 72' | Report | | Stadium: Glanford Park; Attendance: 3,566; Referee: Lee Probert |

| 28 February 2004 33 | Northampton Town | 1–0 | Leyton Orient | Northampton |
| 15:00 GMT | P.Reid (red card) 66'; J.Low 73' | Report | | Stadium: Sixfields Stadium; Attendance: 5,784; Referee: Phil Joslin |

| 2 March 2004 34 | Kidderminster Harriers | 2–1 | Northampton Town | Kidderminster |
| 19:45 GMT | D.Keates 29'; D.Bennett 47' | Report | C.Hargreaves 56' | Stadium: Aggborough; Attendance: 2,699; Referee: Eddie Ilderton |

| 6 March 2004 35 | Cambridge United | 0–1 | Northampton Town | Cambridge |
| 13:00 GMT | | Report | C.Willmott 90' | Stadium: Abbey Stadium; Attendance: 4,298; Referee: Grant Hegley |

| 13 March 2004 36 | Northampton Town | 2–0 | Boston United | Northampton |
| 15:00 GMT | S.Morison 72'; I.Sampson 86' | Report | | Stadium: Sixfields Stadium; Attendance: 6,243; Referee: Andre Marriner |

| 16 March 2004 37 | Carlisle United | 1–1 | Northampton Town | Carlisle |
| 19:45 GMT | C.Farrell 82' | Report | P.Trollope 83' | Stadium: Brunton Park; Attendance: 6,269; Referee: Grant Hegley |

| 27 March 2004 38 | Macclesfield Town | 0–4 | Northampton Town | Macclesfield |
| 15:00 GMT | | Report | M.Richards 18', 23', 26', 39' | Stadium: Moss Rose; Attendance: 2,634; Referee: Howard Webb |

| 3 April 2004 39 | Northampton Town | 2–1 | Oxford United | Northampton |
| 15:00 BST | M.Richards 63'; P.Trollope 73' | Report | S.Basham 22' | Stadium: Sixfields Stadium; Attendance: 6,799; Referee: Kevin Friend |

| 10 April 2004 40 | Hull City | 2–3 | Northampton Town | Kingston upon Hull |
| 15:00 BST | S.Elliott 7'; A.Dawson 69' | Report | M.Richards 2'; E.Sabin 20', 31' | Stadium: KC Stadium; Attendance: 18,017; Referee: Iain Williamson |

| 12 April 2004 41 | Northampton Town | 1–1 | Lincoln City | Northampton |
| 15:00 BST | P.Trollope 44' | Report | S.Yeo 84' | Stadium: Sixfields Stadium; Attendance: 7,160; Referee: Paul Taylor |

| 17 April 2004 42 | Northampton Town | 2–2 | Southend United | Northampton |
| 15:00 BST | M.Smith 24' (pen.); J.Taylor 83' | Report | L.Constantine 16' (pen.); P.Reid 45' (o.g.) | Stadium: Sixfields Stadium; Attendance: 5,919; Referee: Matt Messias |

| 20 April 2004 43 | Northampton Town | 0–1 | Huddersfield Town | Northampton |
| 19:45 BST | | Report | A.Booth 53' | Stadium: Sixfields Stadium; Attendance: 6,873; Referee: Nigel Miller |
Note: Fixture was previously abandoned on March 20, 2004 due to safety reasons after 39 minutes.

| 24 April 2004 44 | Swansea City | 0–2 | Northampton Town | Swansea, Wales |
| 15:00 BST | | | E.Sabin 34', 43' | Stadium: Vetch Field; Attendance: 4,985; Referee: Andy Penn |

| 1 May 2004 45 | Northampton Town | 3–2 | Bury | Northampton |
| 15:00 BST | M.Smith 41'; E.Sabin (red card) 54'; M.Richards 60'; D.Asamoah 74' | Report | J.Cartledge 10'; D.Nugent 45' | Stadium: Sixfields Stadium; Attendance: 6,179; Referee: Trevor Parkes |

| 8 May 2004 46 | Mansfield Town | 1–2 | Northampton Town | Mansfield |
| 15:00 BST | C.Larkin 54' | Report | E.Sabin 19'; R.Ullathorne 70' | Stadium: Field Mill; Attendance: 8,065; Referee: Mike Thorpe |

==== Play-offs ====
| 16 May 2004 Semi-final 1st leg | Northampton Town | 0–2 | Mansfield Town | Northampton |
| 15:00 BST | A.Westwood (red card) 90' | Report | R.Day 40'; J.Mendes 67' | Stadium: Sixfields Stadium; Attendance: 6,960; Referee: Michael Jones |

| 20 May 2004 Semi-final 2nd leg | Mansfield Town | 1–3 (3–3 agg.) (5–4 p) | Northampton Town | Mansfield |
| 19:45 BST | T.Curtis 68' | Report | M.Richards 36'; C.Hargreaves 42'; M.Smith 46' | Stadium: Field Mill; Attendance: 9,243 (2,600); Referee: Phil Crossley |
| | Penalties |
| | W.Corden (penalty scored); L.Lawrence (penalty scored); N.MacKenzie (penalty scored); L.D'Jaffo (penalty scored); C.Larkin (penalty scored) | | M.Reeves (penalty scored); M.Smith (penalty scored); P.Reid (penalty scored); E.Sabin (penalty missed); C.Willmott (penalty scored) |

=== FA Cup ===
| 8 November 2003 First round | Northampton Town | 3–2 | Plymouth Argyle | Northampton |
| 15:00 GMT | R.Walker 37'; C.Hargreaves 60'; D.Asamoah 83' | Report | D.Friio 32'; I.Stonebridge 63' | Stadium: Sixfields Stadium; Attendance: 4,385; Referee: Lee Cable |

| 6 December 2003 Second round | Northampton Town | 4–1 | Weston-super-Mare | Northampton |
| 15:00 GMT | M.Smith 36' (pen.); J.Low 64'; M.Richards 77', 90' | Report | M.McKeever (red card) 36'; B.Clark 80' | Stadium: Sixfields Stadium; Attendance: 3,948; Referee: Mark Cooper |

| 3 January 2004 Third round | Northampton Town | 1–1 | Rotherham United | Northampton |
| 15:00 GMT | M.Smith 63' | Report | R.Barker 55' | Stadium: Sixfields Stadium; Attendance: 5,741; Referee: Ray Olivier |

| 13 January 2004 Third round (r) | Rotherham United | 1–2 | Northampton Town | Rotherham |
| 19:45 GMT | P.Hurst 19' | Report | R.Walker 36'; M.Smith 54' | Stadium: Millmoor; Attendance: 9,405; Referee: Ray Olivier |

| 25 January 2004 Fourth round | Northampton Town | 0–3 | Manchester United | Northampton |
| 16:05 GMT | | Report | M.Silvestre 33'; C.Hargreaves 47' (o.g.); D.Forlán 68' | Stadium: Sixfields Stadium; Attendance: 7,356; Referee: Steve Bennett |

=== League Cup ===
| 12 August 2003 First round | Northampton Town | 1–0 | Norwich City | Northampton |
| 19:45 BST | J.Low 8' | Report | | Stadium: Sixfields Stadium; Attendance: 5,476; Referee: Ray Olivier |

| 23 September 2003 Second round | Portsmouth | 5–2 | Northampton Town | Portsmouth |
| 19:45 BST | T.Sherwood 13', 83'; J.Roberts 17', 60'; M.Taylor 41' | Report | C.Hargreaves 77' (pen.); L.Dudfield 90' | Stadium: Fratton Park; Attendance: 11,130; Referee: David Crick |

=== League Trophy ===
| 2 November 2003 2nd round (s) | Hereford United | 1–1 (3–4 p) | Northampton Town | Hereford |
| 19:45 GMT | D.Brown 87' | Report | L.Dudfield 75' | Stadium: Edgar Street; Attendance: 1,517; Referee: Mick Fletcher |
| | Penalties |
| | D.Brown (penalty scored); T.James (penalty scored); M.Rose (penalty scored); S.Guinan (penalty missed); J.Pitman (penalty missed); Harrhy (penalty missed) | | M.Reeves (penalty scored); R.Walker (penalty missed); J.Low (penalty missed); M.Smith (penalty scored); L.Dudfield (penalty scored); C.Willmott (penalty scored) |

| 9 December 2003 Quarter-final (s) | Northampton Town | 2–1 (a.e.t.) | Peterborough United | Northampton |
| 19:45 GMT | J.Low 52'; L.Dudfield 100' | Report | L.McKenzie 90' | Stadium: Sixfields Stadium; Attendance: 4,290; Referee: Tony Leake |

| 20 January 2004 Semi-final (s) | Northampton Town | 2–3 (a.e.t.) | Colchester United | Northampton |
| 19:45 GMT | R.Walker 14', 51' | Report | S.McGleish 61', 86', 95' | Stadium: Sixfields Stadium; Attendance: 4,034; Referee: Phil Crossley |

=== Appearances, goals and cards ===
| No. | Pos | Player | Division Three | | | FA Cup | | | League Cup | | | League Trophy | | | Play-offs | | | Total | | | Discipline | |
| No. | Pos | Player | Starts | Sub | Goals | Starts | Sub | Goals | Starts | Sub | Goals | Starts | Sub | Goals | Starts | Sub | Goals | Starts | Sub | Goals | Yellow card | Red card |
|---|---|---|---|---|---|---|---|---|---|---|---|---|---|---|---|---|---|---|---|---|---|---|
| 1 | GK | Glyn Thompson | 7 | 1 | – | – | – | – | 1 | – | – | – | – | – | – | – | – | 8 | 1 | – | 1 | – |
| 2 | RB | Luke Chambers | 19 | 5 | – | – | 2 | – | 2 | – | – | 1 | – | – | – | – | – | 22 | 7 | – | 3 | – |
| 3 | LB | Peter Clark | 6 | – | – | – | – | – | 1 | – | – | – | – | – | – | – | – | 7 | – | – | 2 | – |
| 4 | CB | Ashley Westwood | 7 | 1 | – | 1 | – | – | 1 | – | – | – | – | – | 1 | – | – | 10 | 1 | – | – | 1 |
| 5 | CB | Chris Willmott | 35 | 1 | 1 | 4 | – | – | 2 | – | – | 3 | – | – | 2 | – | – | 46 | 1 | 1 | 6 | 1 |
| 6 | CB | Paul Reid | 33 | – | 2 | 3 | – | – | 2 | – | – | 1 | 1 | – | 1 | 1 | – | 40 | 2 | 2 | 4 | 2 |
| 7 | CM | Martin Reeves | 9 | 5 | – | 2 | 1 | – | – | 1 | – | 1 | 1 | – | – | 1 | – | 12 | 9 | – | 1 | – |
| 8 | ST | Tom Youngs | 2 | 10 | – | – | – | – | 1 | – | – | – | – | – | – | 1 | – | 3 | 11 | – | – | – |
| 9 | ST | Marc Richards | 27 | 14 | 8 | – | 4 | 2 | 2 | – | – | 2 | 1 | – | 2 | – | 1 | 33 | 19 | 11 | 7 | – |
| 10 | RM | Josh Low | 28 | 5 | 3 | 2 | – | 1 | 1 | – | 1 | 2 | – | 1 | 2 | – | – | 35 | 5 | 6 | 6 | – |
| 11 | CM | Paul Trollope | 43 | – | 6 | 4 | – | – | 2 | – | – | 1 | 1 | – | 2 | – | – | 52 | 1 | 6 | 7 | – |
| 12 | LB | Rob Ullathorne | 13 | – | 1 | – | – | – | – | – | – | – | – | – | 2 | – | – | 15 | – | 1 | 4 | – |
| 14 | CB | Ian Sampson | 35 | 2 | 2 | 5 | – | – | – | 1 | – | 2 | – | – | 2 | – | – | 43 | 3 | 2 | 10 | 1 |
| 16 | U | Ryan Amoo | – | 1 | – | – | – | – | – | – | – | – | – | – | – | – | – | – | 1 | – | – | – |
| 17 | CM | Greg Lincoln | 4 | 3 | 1 | 2 | – | – | – | – | – | 1 | – | – | – | – | – | 7 | 3 | 1 | 1 | – |
| 18 | ST | Éric Sabin | 8 | 2 | 5 | – | – | – | – | – | – | – | – | – | 1 | – | – | 9 | 2 | 5 | 2 | 1 |
| 19 | ST | Martin Smith | 43 | 1 | 11 | 5 | – | 3 | 1 | – | – | 2 | 1 | – | 2 | – | 1 | 54 | 2 | 15 | 4 | – |
| 20 | CM | Chris Hargreaves | 41 | 1 | 3 | 5 | – | 1 | 1 | 1 | 1 | 2 | – | – | 2 | – | 1 | 51 | 2 | 6 | 6 | – |
| 21 | GK | Lee Harper | 39 | – | – | 5 | – | – | 1 | – | – | 3 | – | – | 2 | – | – | 50 | – | – | – | 1 |
| 22 | CM | David Hicks | – | – | – | – | – | – | – | – | – | – | – | – | – | – | – | – | – | – | – | – |
| 23 | GK | Luke Weaver | – | – | – | – | – | – | – | – | – | – | – | – | – | – | – | – | – | – | – | – |
| 24 | LB | Chris Carruthers | 19 | 5 | – | 4 | – | – | 1 | – | – | 2 | – | – | – | – | – | 26 | 5 | – | 1 | – |
| 25 | ST | Derek Asamoah | 4 | 27 | 3 | 4 | 1 | 1 | – | – | – | 2 | – | – | 1 | 1 | – | 11 | 29 | 4 | 3 | – |
| 26 | ST | Steve Morison | 2 | 3 | 1 | – | – | – | – | – | – | – | – | – | – | – | – | 2 | 3 | 1 | – | – |
| 30 | RB | Des Lyttle | 24 | 4 | – | 5 | – | – | – | – | – | 3 | – | – | – | – | – | 32 | 4 | – | 3 | – |
| 40 | ST | John Taylor | 3 | 5 | 1 | – | – | – | – | – | – | – | – | – | – | 2 | – | 3 | 7 | 1 | – | – |
Players no longer at the club:
| 12 | ST | Darryn Stamp | – | – | – | – | – | – | – | – | – | – | – | – | – | – | – | – | – | – | – | – |
| 12 | CB | Chris Doig | 9 | – | – | – | – | – | – | – | – | – | – | – | – | – | – | 9 | – | – | 1 | – |
| 12 | LB | Matthew Sadler | 7 | – | – | – | – | – | – | – | – | 1 | – | – | – | – | – | 8 | – | – | – | – |
| 12 | CM | Nabil Abidallah | – | 1 | – | – | – | – | – | – | – | – | 1 | – | – | – | – | – | 2 | – | – | – |
| 13 | ST | Magno Vieira | 7 | 3 | 2 | – | – | – | – | – | – | – | – | – | – | – | – | 7 | 3 | 2 | – | – |
| 15 | CM | Tom Smith | – | – | – | – | – | – | – | – | – | – | – | – | – | – | – | – | – | – | – | – |
| 16 | ST | Lawrie Dudfield | 12 | 7 | 3 | – | 1 | – | 1 | 1 | 1 | – | 2 | 2 | – | – | – | 13 | 11 | 5 | – | – |
| 18 | CM | Paul Harsley | 5 | 9 | – | – | 2 | – | 1 | – | – | 1 | 1 | – | – | – | – | 7 | 12 | – | 3 | – |
| 22 | RM | Paul Rickers | – | – | – | – | – | – | – | 1 | – | – | – | – | – | – | – | – | 1 | – | – | – |
| 27 | MF | Dean Cracknell | – | – | – | – | – | – | – | – | – | – | – | – | – | – | – | – | – | – | – | – |
| 28 | ST | Richard Walker | 11 | 1 | 4 | 4 | – | 2 | – | – | – | 3 | – | 2 | – | – | – | 18 | 1 | 8 | – | – |
| 29 | MF | Aaran Cavill | – | – | – | – | – | – | – | – | – | – | – | – | – | – | – | – | – | – | – | – |
| 30 | CM | Oliver Burgess | 3 | 6 | – | – | – | – | 1 | 1 | – | – | – | – | – | – | – | 4 | 7 | – | 2 | – |
| 31 | RB | Jerry Gill | – | – | – | – | – | – | – | – | – | – | – | – | – | – | – | – | – | – | – | – |
