= Beer Albion F.C. =

Football club in Devon

Beer Albion Football Club
- Full name: Beer Albion
- Nickname: The Fishermen
- Founded: 17 October 1919
- Ground: The Furzebrake, Beer, Devon
- Capacity: 2000
- Chairman: John Moughton
- League: Devon Football League
- Website: https://www.beeralbionfc.co.uk
Home colours	Away colours

Beer Albion Football Club is an association football club located in Beer, Devon, England. The club currently has two active teams, a first team and a reserves.

Until the 2026–27 season, the first team played at step 7 of the national league system or level 11 of the English football pyramid in the Devon Football League whilst the reserves are in division 2 of the Devon & Exeter Football League.

== History ==
Beer Albion was founded on 17 October 1919 and joined the Perry Street Junior League in 1921. Both the first team and the reserves remained in this league until 1952 when they joined the Devon & Exeter Football League.

In recent history the first team have experienced success winning the Devon Premier Cup in 2021–22 and earning promotion to the Devon Football League. In their first season in 2022–23, they were crowned Double Champions after winning the league and the league cup.

=== Centenary ===
In 2019 Beer Albion celebrated 100 years as a club with a centenary match against Axminster Town, a match between the two finalists of the first ever Morrison Bell Cup Final. Axminster won the game 6–1.

=== Devon Premier Cup: 2021–22 ===
For the first time in their history Beer Albion reached the final of the Devon Premier Cup after beating Exwick Villa 3–1 at Budleigh Salterton. On 28 May 2022 Beer Albion played North Molton in the final at Coach Road, Devon FA Headquarters. In the early stages of the game North Molton found themselves 1–0 up thanks to a goal from Dylan Williams. Beer Albion scored an equaliser before half time through a goal from Charley Skilton. The game ended 1–1 after extra time and went to penalties. The result ended up 5–4 on penalties as Will House scored the winning penalty. Beer Albion became the first Devon & Exeter Football League side to win the competition for 32 years.

=== Double winners: 2022–23 ===
The first team won the Devon Football League North & East and the Devon Football League Cup in 2022–23.

In the league campaign the first team played 22 games, winning 15, drawing five and losing only two. Beer Albion remained unbeaten until they came up against Topsham Town in their 19th game, losing 4–2 despite going 2–0 up. They then followed this result with another loss against Thorverton, losing 2–1, before the title was won due to chasing team North Molton dropping points in their title chase, meaning Beer Albion could not be caught. On 1 May 2023 Beer Albion played University of Exeter and drew 1–1 thanks to a late equaliser from Liam Cox, and lifted the league trophy in front of the Beer supporters.

The cup was won on 6 May 2023 at Barnstaple Town facing Mount Gould. Both teams went down to 10 men in the first half and Beer led 2–0. But Mount Gould fought back to win the game 4–2 thanks to goals from Taylor Rooke, Finley Rooke and Giles Basson.

=== Cup double: 2023–24 ===
In 2024 Beer Albion became the first team to win back-to-back Devon Football League Cups in front of a home crowd after beating North Molton 2-0.

The first team also went on to win the Devon Premier Cup for the second time beating Park United 3–1.

== Achievements ==
- Devon Football League
  - North & East League Winners: 2022–23
  - League Cup Winners: 2022–23, 2023–24
- Devon & Exeter Football League
  - Division 1 Champions: 1954–55, 1968–69
  - Division 2 Champions: 1967–68, 1982–83
  - Division 5 Champions: 1981–82
  - Division 7 Champions: 2006–07
  - Division 9 Champions: 1998–99
  - Devon Premier Cup Winners: 2021–22 2023/24
  - Morrison Bell Cup Winners: 1921–22, 1923–24, 1926–27, 1931–32, 1954–55, 1955–56, 1960–61
  - Golesworthy Cup Winners: 1937–38, 1950–51, 1981–82, 2009–10
  - Seaton Challenge Cup Winners: 1950–51, 1951–52, 1956–57, 1958–59, 1959–60, 1961–62, 1967–68, 1968–69, 1969–70, 1975–76, 1997–98
  - Carlisle Cup Winners: 1998–99
  - Axminster Hospital Cup Winners: 1936–37, 1946–47, 1960–61

== Ground ==
Beer Albion have played at their home The Furzebrake since 1936 after previously playing at White Cliff in Beer.

== Managers ==
Listed according to when they became managers for Beer Albion

- 2015–2019: Richard Walker
- 2019–2026: Mark Rooke
- 2026–current: Alfie Matthews & Stuart Harwood

== Records ==
- League victory: 8–3 v St Martins – 1 February 1986
