= Richard Walker (footballer, born 1977) =

English footballer

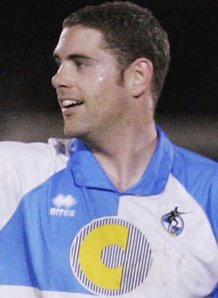

Personal information
- Full name: Richard Martin Walker
- Date of birth: 8 November 1977 (age 49)
- Place of birth: Birmingham, England
- Position: Forward

Senior career*
Years	Team	Apps	(Gls)
1997–2001	Aston Villa	6	(2)
1998–1999	→ Cambridge United (loan)	21	(3)
2001	→ Blackpool (loan)	18	(3)
2001	→ Wycombe Wanderers (loan)	12	(3)
2001–2004	Blackpool	62	(12)
2003–2004	→ Northampton Town	12	(4)
2004	→ Oxford United (loan)	4	(0)
2004–2009	Bristol Rovers	143	(46)
2008–2009	→ Shrewsbury Town (loan)	27	(5)
2009–2011	Burton Albion	35	(4)
2011–2012	Solihull Moors	5	(1)
2012–2013	Beer Albion		

Managerial career
- 2013–2019: Beer Albion
- * Club domestic league appearances and goals as of 00:00, 10 October 2018 (UTC)

Richard Martin Walker (born 8 November 1977) is an English former footballer who played as a forward.

== Career ==
=== Early career ===
Walker started his career at Aston Villa in 1997. Here, he scored a goal against Arsenal, one of the highest points of his Villa career. After loan spells with Cambridge United, Blackpool and Wycombe Wanderers, he signed for the Seasiders in 2001. He helped Blackpool win the 2001–02 Football League Trophy, playing as a substitute in the final. Walker was loaned out to Northampton Town and Oxford United in the 2003–04 season, before joining Bristol Rovers in the summer of 2004.

=== Bristol Rovers ===
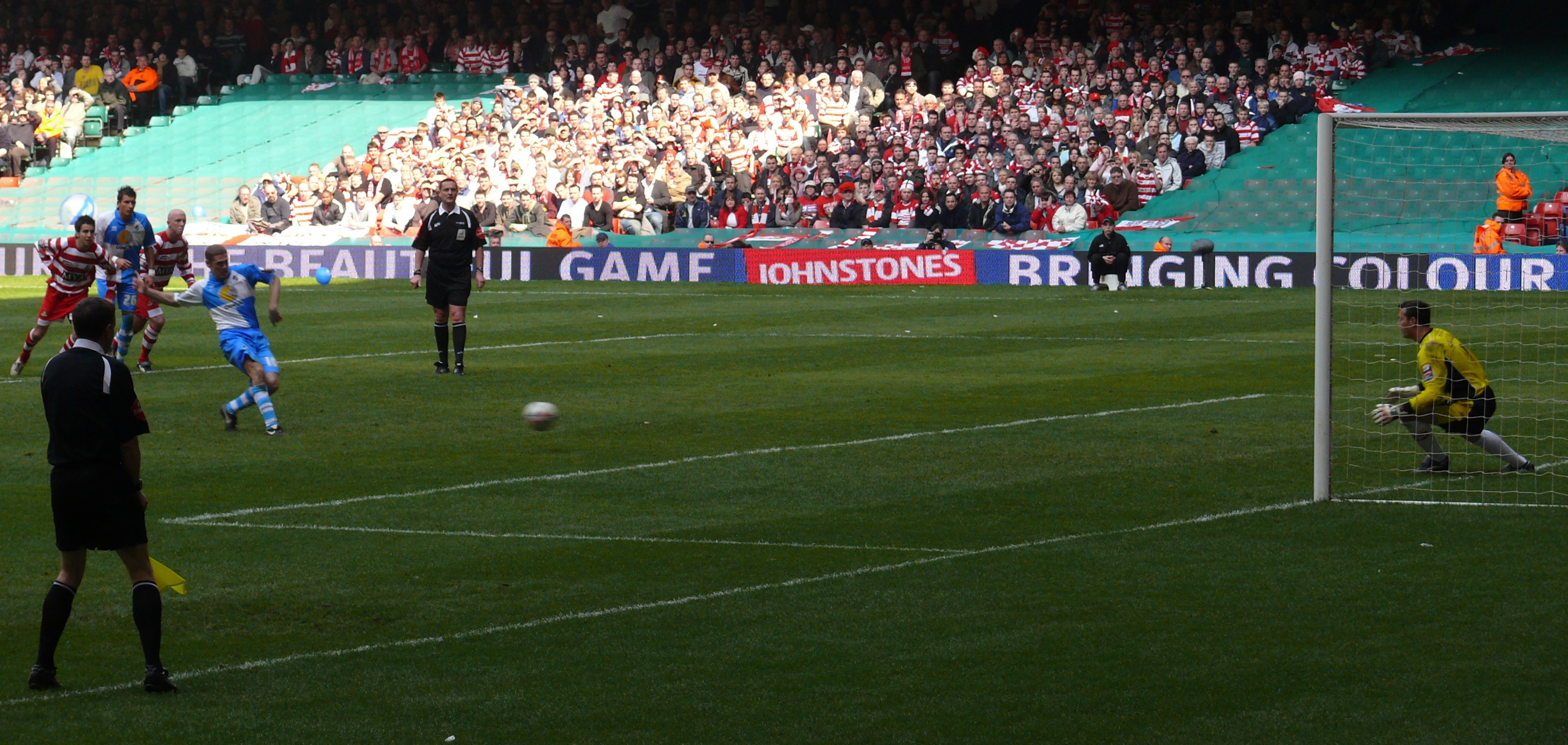
Walker scores a penalty for Bristol Rovers against Doncaster Rovers in the 2007 Football League Trophy Final.

A natural goalscorer, he formed a formidable partnership with Junior Agogo before the Ghanaian was sold to Nottingham Forest. Walker scored two goals in the 2007 League Two Play-off Final against Shrewsbury at Wembley, as the Gasheads secured a 3–1 victory to send them up to League One.

Walker was placed on the transfer list at the end of the 2007–08 season, having scored only four goals in that season, all from the penalty spot. He joined Shrewsbury on a full-season loan in the summer of 2008, taking him up to the expiry of his contract with Bristol Rovers.

=== Burton Albion ===
Following the expiry of his Bristol Rovers contract, he joined newly promoted Burton Albion in July 2009 on a two-year contract, he scored 4 goals in 35 games for the club before his release in May 2011.

=== Solihull Moors ===
On 9 September 2011, Solihull Moors announced the signing of Richard Walker. He made his debut the following day in a 1–0 away win at Boston United. He scored his first goal for the club on 17 September 2011, opening the scoring as Solihull overcame Altrincham 2–0 at Damson Park.

=== Post-retirement ===
After having played less than a season of Conference North football, he opted to move with his family to Devon in April 2012. Following his retirement, Walker has worked in a large warehouse for Axminster Tools.

He ended the season playing for Beer Albion in the Premier Division of the Devon & Exeter Football League, at level 12 of the league system, some six levels below the team where he had begun the year. He was recruited for Beer by a colleague who played for the team, and who convinced Richard to play alongside him. In August 2019, Walker was announced to have stepped away from the role of player-manager, staying on at the club as a player alongside his sons Sammie and Jamie.

== Career statistics ==
Appearances and goals by club, season and competition
Club	Season	League			FA Cup		League Cup		League Trophy		Other		Total	
Club	Season	Division	Apps	Goals	Apps	Goals	Apps	Goals	Apps	Goals	Apps	Goals	Apps	Goals
Aston Villa	1997–98	Premier League	1	0	0	0	0	0	0	0	0	0	1	0
Aston Villa	1998–99	Premier League	0	0	0	0	0	0	0	0	0	0	0	0
Aston Villa	1999–2000	Premier League	5	2	0	0	1	0	0	0	0	0	6	2
Aston Villa	2000–01	Premier League	0	0	1	0	0	0	0	0	1	0	2	0
Aston Villa	Total		29	4	0	0	4	3	7	2	0	0	40	9
Cambridge United (loan)	1998–99	Third Division	21	3	0	0	0	0	3	1	0	0	24	3
Blackpool (loan)	2000–01	Third Division	18	3	0	0	0	0	0	0	0	0	18	3
Wycombe Wanderers (loan)	2001–02	Second Division	12	3	1	1	0	0	0	0	0	0	13	3
Blackpool	2001–02	Second Division	21	8	0	0	0	0	2	3	0	0	23	11
Blackpool	2002–03	Second Division	32	4	3	0	1	0	2	0	0	0	38	4
Blackpool	2003–04	Second Division	9	0	0	0	0	0	0	0	0	0	9	0
Blackpool	Total		62	12	3	0	1	0	4	3	0	0	70	15
Northampton Town (loan)	2003–04	Third Division	12	4	4	2	0	0	3	2	0	0	19	8
Oxford United (loan)	2003–04	Third Division	1	0	0	0	0	0	0	0	0	0	1	0
Oxford United	2003–04	Third Division	3	0	0	0	0	0	0	0	0	0	3	0
Bristol Rovers	2004–05	League Two	27	10	1	1	2	1	2	2	0	0	32	14
Bristol Rovers	2005–06	League Two	46	20	3	0	1	0	1	0	1	1	52	21
Bristol Rovers	2006–07	League Two	49	16	5	4	1	1	5	1	0	0	60	22
Bristol Rovers	2007–08	League One	24	4	4	0	2	0	1	0	0	0	31	4
Bristol Rovers	Total		146	50	13	5	6	2	9	3	1	1	175	61
Shrewsbury Town (loan)	2008–09	League Two	27	5	1	0	1	0	3	1	0	0	32	6
Burton Albion	2009–10	League Two	17	3	1	0	1	0	1	0	0	0	20	3
Burton Albion	2010–11	League Two	18	1	0	0	0	0	1	1	0	0	19	2
Burton Albion	Total		35	4	1	0	1	0	2	1	0	0	39	5
Solihull Moors	2011–12	Conference North	5	1	0	0	0	0	0	0	0	0	5	1
Career total			347	87	24	8	10	2	24	11	2	1	408	109

== Honours ==
Blackpool

- Football League Trophy: 2001–02

Crewe Alexandra

- Football League Second Division runner-up: 2002–03

Bristol Rovers

- Football League Two play-offs: 2007
- Football League Trophy runner-up: 2006–07
