= Ilminster Town F.C. =

Association football club in England

Ilminster Town
- Full name: Ilminster Town Football Club
- Nickname: The Blues
- Founded: 1920
- Ground: The Recreation Ground, Ilminster
- Chairman: Dan Haines
- Manager: Paddy Behan
- League: South West Peninsula League Premier Division East
- 2025–26: South West Peninsula League Premier Division East, 7th of 16
Home colours	Away colours

Ilminster Town Football Club is a football club based in Ilminster, Somerset, England. They are currently members of the South West Peninsula League Premier Division East, Somerset County League Division 3 and field a further men's team in the Perry Street League. They have two ladies' teams, the first team in the South West Regional League, Premier Division and the reserves in the Somerset County Women's League, Division One. The club plays its home games at the Recreation Ground.

== History ==
Ilminster entered the FA Cup for the first time in 1948–49. They continued to play regularly in the FA Cup throughout the 1950s; their best performance was reaching the Second Qualifying Round.

The club joined the Western Football League in the newly reformed Division One for the 1976–77 season. The following season, Ilminster were promoted to the Premier Division after finishing third. They lasted two seasons in this division, during which time they reached the Third Round of the FA Vase, before being relegated back to Division One. Two seasons later, the club left the Western League altogether.

Ilminster Town joined the Somerset Senior League Division One in 1985–86, but were relegated to Division Two in 1988. The next season the club were crowned champions and regained their Division One status. They remained in the league until being relegated in 1995. Again they bounced back the following season by winning Division Two. In 1999, the club was again relegated, and only returned to Division one after finishing runners-up in 2002–03. The following season, Ilminster were crowned champions of Division One and reached the Premier Division for the first time. In 2008, the club was relegated back to Division One, but returned to the Premier Division in 2012 after again winning the league title.

== Ground ==
Ilminster Town play their home games at The Archie Gooch Pavilion, Ilminster, Somerset, TA19 0EY.

== Honours ==
=== League ===
Somerset County League Division 1

- Winners – 2011–12, 2016–17, 2024-2025

Somerset County League Division 2

- Winners – 1988–89, 1995–96

Perry Street and District League Premier Division

- Winners – 1925–26, 1926–27, 1930–31, 1932–33, 1938–39, 1946–47, 1958–59 (Reserves), 2002–03 (Reserves), 2025-26 (Reserves)

=== Cup ===
Somerset Intermediate Cup

- Winners (1) - 2001–02

Somerset Junior Cup

- Winners (3) – 1932–33, 1935–35, 1938–39

Somerset premier league Cup 24/25

== Records ==
- FA Cup
  - Second Qualifying Round 1952–53, 1953–54, 1955–56, 1956–57, 1957–58, 1959–60, 1976–77
- FA Trophy
  - First Qualifying Round 1979–80
- FA Vase
  - Third Round 1978–79
