= Devon and Exeter Football League =

- Country: England
- Divisions: 9
- Feeder to: Devon Football League
- Website: Official

The Devon and Exeter Football League is a football competition based in Devon in England. It was established around 1900. The top division of this league, the Premier, is a feeder to the Devon Football League.

The league covers a 50-mile (80 km) range from Exeter.

== 2026–27 members list by division ==
All are first teams except where indicated (2nd, 3rd, Reserves etc.).

=== Premier ===
- Beer Albion
- Colyton
- Crediton United 2nd
- East Budleigh
- Feniton
- Lyme Regis
- Ottery St Mary 2nd
- Sidmouth Town 2nd
- South Zeal United
- St Martins
- University of Exeter 2nd
- Upottery
- Wellington Reserves
- Westexe Park Rangers

=== Division 1 ===
- Alphington 2nd
- Central
- Clyst Valley
- Dawlish United
- Elmore 2nd
- Exmouth Spartans
- Hatherleigh Town
- Kentisbeare
- Newton St Cyres
- Tedburn St Mary
- Teignmouth 2nd
- University of Exeter 3rd

=== Division 2 ===
- Beer Albion 2nd
- Broadclyst
- Cullompton Rangers 2nd
- Halwill
- Heavitree United
- Lympstone
- Morchard Bishop
- Newtown 2nd
- Royal Oak
- University of Exeter 4th
- Witheridge

=== Division 3 ===
- Axminster Town 2nd
- Clyst Valley 2nd
- Exeter Royals
- Feniton 2nd
- Okehampton Argyle 2nd
- Sidmouth Town 3rd
- Starcross Dons
- Tipton St John
- University of Exeter 5th
- Upottery 2nd
- Willand XI

=== Division 4 ===
- Alphington 3rd
- Beacon Knights
- Cheriton Fitzpaine
- Dunkeswell Rovers
- East Budleigh 2nd
- Ex Dons
- Millwey Rise
- St Martins 2nd
- Topsham Town 2nd
- University of Exeter 6th
- Uplowman United
- Whipton & Pinhoe

=== Division 5 ===
- Awliscombe
- Bampton
- Bradninch
- Chagford
- Exmouth Albion
- North Tawton
- Otterton
- Priory
- Sandford
- Tedburn St Mary 2nd
- University of Exeter 7th
- Westexe Park Rangers 2nd

=== Division 6 Brown ===
- Axminster Town 3rd
- Axmouth United
- Colyton 2nd
- Cranbrook Town
- Cranbrook United
- Exmouth Riptide
- Farway United
- Lyme Regis Reserves
- Millwey Rise 2nd
- Offwell Rangers
- Seaton Town
- Uplyme

=== Division 6 Davey ===
- Bow Amateur Athletic Club
- Chagford 2nd
- Cheriton Fitzpaine 2nd
- Hatherleigh Town 2nd
- Newton St Cyres 2nd
- Okehampton Argyle 3rd
- Phoenix United 2nd
- South Zeal United 2nd
- Tedburn St Mary 3rd
- Topsham Town 3rd
- Witheridge 2nd

=== Division 6 Webb ===
- Central 2nd
- Dawlish United 2nd
- Elmore 3rd
- Exeter International United
- Exmouth Albion 2nd
- Hemyock
- Impact Albion
- Lympstone 2nd
- Phoenix United
- Starcross Dons 2nd
- University of Exeter 8th
- Whipton & Pinhoe 2nd

== Recent champions ==
| Season | Premier Division | Premier Cup | Senior Cup | Intermediate Cup |
|---|---|---|---|---|
| 2006–07 | Axminster Town | Tavistock | Combe Martin | Sidbury United |
| 2007–08 | University of Exeter II | Totnes & Dartington SC | Willand Rovers Res. | Buckland Athletic III |
| 2008–09 | St Martins | Boca Seniors | Buckland Athletic Res. | Lamerton |
| 2009–10 | Thorverton | Appledore BAAC | Buckland Athletic Res. | Woolsery |
| 2010–11 | Sidmouth Town | Liverton United | Loddiswell United | Vospers Oak Villa |
| 2011–12 | St Martins | Liverton United | Bow AAC | Morley Rangers |
| 2012–13 | Feniton | Exmouth Town | Tiverton Town Res. | Millwey Rise |
| 2013–14 | St Martins | Watcombe Wanderers | Dartmouth | Bar Sol Ona |
| 2014–15 | Tiverton Town Res. | St Martins | Exwick Villa Res. | Roselands |
| 2015–16 | Topsham Town | Appledore | University Exeter Res. | Sporting Barum |
| 2016–17 | Honiton Town | Exeter University | Cronies | Royal Oak (Exeter) |
| 2017–18 | Elmore | Teignmouth | Sidmouth Town | Elmore Reserves |
| 2018–19 | Exwick Villa | Bovey Tracey | The Windmill Reserves | Combe Martin |
| 2019–20 | Season abandoned | Mount Gould | Thorverton | Farway United |
| 2020–21 | Season abandoned | Mount Gould | Ottery St Mary Reserves | Witheridge Reserves |
| 2021–22 | Lapford | Beer Albion | Kingsteignton Athletic | Ivybridge Town 3rds |
| 2022–23 | Alphington | Mount Gould | University of Exeter III | Bovey Tracey Res |
| 2023–24 | Alphington | | | |
| 2024–25 | Lapford | | | |
| 2024–25 | Upottery | | | |
