= University of Exeter A.F.C. =

Association football club in England

University of Exeter
- Full name: University of Exeter A.F.C.
- Founded: 1950s
- Ground: Exwick Sports Hub, Exeter
- Manager: Javier Martin
- League: South West Peninsula League Premier Division East
- 2025–26: Devon League, 2nd of 17 (promoted)

University of Exeter A.F.C. is a football club based in Exeter, Devon, tied to the University of Exeter. They are currently members of the South West Peninsula League Premier Division East and play at the Exwick Sports Hub.

== History ==
Formed in the 1950s, University of Exeter competed in the Devon and Exeter Football League (then called the Exeter & District League), reaching the Premier Division in the 1970s. They joined the Devon County League in 2002. When the Devon County League merged with the South Western Football League to form the South West Peninsula League in 2007, University of Exeter were placed in Division One East.

University of Exeter competed in Division One East for twelve seasons, with a best finish of third in 2015–16. When the South West Peninsula League disbanded its second tier in 2019, the club joined the Devon Football League North East Division, winning it in 2021–22. The league was reduced to a single division in 2023–24, and University of Exeter won the league again that season and the following season. After being refused promotion due to ground grading issues, the club made the necessary improvements and finished runners-up in 2025–26, winning promotion to the South West Peninsula League Premier Division East.

The club has multiple reserve teams competing in the Devon and Exeter League.

== Honours ==
- Devon and Exeter League: Premier Division Champions 1979–80, 1980–81, 1997–98, 2000–01, 2001–02
- Devon Football League: Champions 2021–22 (NE Division), 2023–24, 2024–25
