= Lee Canoville =

English former professional footballer, who played as a defender

Personal information
- Full name: Lee Canoville
- Date of birth: 14 March 1981 (age 45)
- Place of birth: Ealing, England
- Height: 6 ft 1 in (1.85 m)
- Position: Defender

Youth career
- 1994–1997: Millwall
- 1997–1998: Arsenal

Senior career*
Years	Team	Apps	(Gls)
1998–2001	Arsenal	0	(0)
2001	→ Northampton Town (loan)	2	(0)
2001–2005	Torquay United	112	(2)
2005–2007	Boston United	64	(1)
2007	→ Shrewsbury Town (loan)	7	(0)
2007–2008	Notts County	35	(0)
2008	Grays Athletic	0	(0)
2008–2009	Halesowen Town	1	(0)
2009	→ Gainsborough Trinity (loan)		
2009–2012	Boston United	99	(5)
2012–2013	Spalding United		

International career
1996–1998	England U16	8	(0)

Managerial career
- 2011–2012: Boston United (Joint with Jason Lee)
- * Club domestic league appearances and goals as of 15:58, 18 April 2010 (UTC)

Lee Canoville (born 14 March 1981) is an English football coach and former professional footballer.

As a player he was a defender who began his career with Premier League side Arsenal, he went on to play in the Football League for Northampton Town, Torquay United, Boston United, Shrewsbury Town and Notts County before playing in Non-league for Grays Athletic, Halesowen Town and Gainsborough Trinity. He returned to Boston in 2011 as joint – player/manager alongside Jason Lee before departing at the end of the 2011–12 season. He has represented England at Under-16 level.

== Playing career ==
Canoville joined Arsenal as an apprentice in the summer of 1997 from the FA School at Lilleshall, turning professional in August 2000. He mainly played for the Gunners' youth and reserve sides; his sole first-team appearance was in a 2–1 League Cup defeat at Highbury at the hands of Ipswich Town on 1 November 2000, coming on as a second-half substitute. In further need of first-team experience he joined Northampton Town on a month's loan on 25 January 2001, making his league début in a goalless draw at home to Peterborough United two days later. He played only one further game for Northampton before returning to Highbury, and although attracting interest from Torquay manager Colin Lee, remained there beyond transfer deadline day.

In April 2001 he went to Middlesbrough on trial, but due to an injury crisis at Highbury was recalled by Arsène Wenger. In the summer of 2001 it was clear that he did not fit into Wenger's plans for Arsenal, and was released. In July he was reported to be training at Watford, with a view to impressing enough to earn a contract.

On 14 September 2001, he joined Torquay United on non-contract terms, along with his former Arsenal teammate Greg Lincoln. His début for the Gulls came the following day in the 2–1 home win against Darlington. Within a week he had impressed manager Roy McFarland enough to earn himself a two-year contract. He helped Torquay to promotion in the 2003–04 season, but was released after Torquay's relegation in 2005, joining Boston United that June. He was voted player of the season in his first season at Boston.

He joined Shrewsbury Town on 31 January 2007, on a loan deal until the end of the 2006–07 season, when his Boston contract expired. His first appearance for the Shrews came in the 1–1 draw at Mansfield Town on 3 February 2007; he was substituted when Shrewsbury led 1–0. He was released in May 2007, injuries ruling him out of the playoffs and hastening his departure, with an expected move to Milton Keynes Dons on the cards. He did however, make a cameo appearance in the playoff final against Bristol Rovers in the form of being incorrectly credited as Shrewsbury's goalscorer in the Wembley Stadium scoreboard, when in fact it was midfielder Stewart Drummond

He had a trial with AFC Bournemouth and on 24 July 2007, but signed for Notts County, in League Two and quickly became a regular in their side, but was released at the end of the season along with seven other players. Canoville joined Conference National outfit Grays Athletic on 1 September 2008. However, he failed to make an appearance for Grays Athletic and joined Halesowen Town in October 2008.

In February 2009, Halesowen loaned Canoville to Gainsborough Trinity for the remainder of the 2008–09 season. On 13 July, Canoville re-signed for Boston United.

On 24 May 2012 Canoville signed with Spalding United as a player. He left them in November 2013, due to injury. On 29 November 2013 his retirement was announced.

== Coaching career ==
On 22 March 2011, Canoville along with Jason Lee was named as joint caretaker manager of Boston United. After guiding the Pilgrims to the Conference North Play-offs and narrowly losing to Guiseley on penalties in the semi-finals, the pair were appointed full-time managers ahead of the 2011–12 season. He left the club at the end of the season.

Canoville now runs his football coaching academy in Nottinghamshire.

== Personal life ==
Canoville's brother Dean was a professional with Millwall, and his first cousin once removed is Paul Canoville, formerly a winger with Chelsea.
