= Perry Street and District League =

Association football league in England

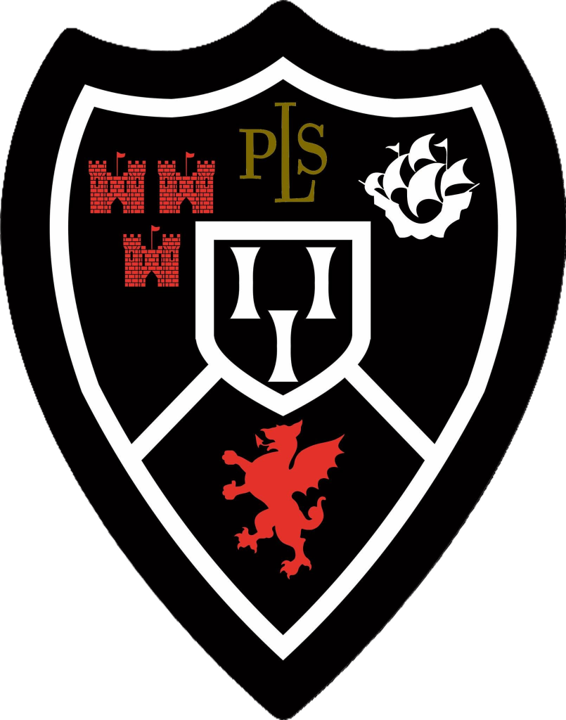
- Founded: 1903
- Country: England
- Divisions: 3
- Number of clubs: 33
- Feeder to: Somerset County League
- Promotion to: Somerset County League Division Three
- Current champions: Ilminster Town Reserves (2025–26)
- Most championships: Merriott Rovers
- Website: website

The Perry Street and District League, commonly known as the Perry Street League, is an association football league in South West England, with clubs primarily based in south Somerset, west Dorset and east Devon. The league currently consists of three divisions, headed by the Premier Division.

The league was founded in 1903 by Charles Edward Small, owner of the Perry Street Lace Works. It originally consisted of five clubs: Perry Street Works, Combe Wanderers, Holyrood Mills, Axminster Town and Horton Rovers. Small is commemorated by the three spools of lace depicted on the league's crest, which also incorporates symbols representing the three counties traditionally served by the competition: the wyvern for Somerset, three castles for Dorset and a sailing ship for Devon.

The Perry Street and District League is affiliated with the Somerset County Football Association. It acts as a feeder league to the Somerset County League, with clubs able to progress into the county league structure.

The league was reduced from five divisions to four following the 2014–15 season. Following the league's annual general meeting at the end of the 2022–23 season, its structure was further reduced from four divisions to three for the 2023–24 season.

== Member clubs 2026–27 ==
Premier Division

- Barrington
- Chard United
- Combe St Nicholas Reserves
- Crewkerne Rangers
- Forton Rangers
- Halstock
- Misterton
- Merriott Moretti
- South Petherton
- Yetminster United

Division One

- Chard United Reserves
- Combe St Nicholas A
- Dowlish Wake & Donyatt
- Forton Rangers Reserves
- Kingsbury Episcopi
- Misterton Reserves
- Netherbury
- South Petherton Reserves
- Thorncombe
- Winsham United
- Yetminster United Reserves

Division Two

- Charmouth
- Combe St Nicholas Colts
- Crewkerne Rangers Reserves
- Dowlish Wake & Donyatt Reserves
- Forton Rangers A
- Ilminster Town A
- Lyme Regis Rovers
- Merriott Saints
- Shepton Beauchamp Reserves
- Southwalk FC
- Winsham United Reserves
- Yetminster Sports

== Current league champions and cup holders ==
Current league champions
Division	Champions
Premier Division	Ilminster Town Reserves
Division One	South Petherton Reserves
Division Two	Netherbury

Current cup holders
Cup	Current holder	Won	2026–27 status
Arthur Gage Memorial Cup	West & Middle Chinnock	2025–26	To be played Easter 2027
Bill Bailey Cup	Merriott Moretti	2025–26	To be played Easter 2027
Challenge Cup	West & Middle Chinnock	2025–26	To be played Easter 2027
Chard Hospital Cup	Chard United	2026–27	Winner
Coronation Cup	Misterton	2025–26	To be played Christmas 2026
Daisy Hutchings Memorial Cup	Forton Rangers	2018–19	Not run
Division One Cup	Merriott Moretti	2025–26	To be played Easter 2027
Jack Venn Cup	Netherbury	2025–26	Not run
John Adams Cup	Axminster Town 3rds	2025–26	Not run
John Fowler Cup	Combe St Nicholas A	2026–27	Winner
Ken Hodges Cup	Chard United 'A'	2022–23	Not run
Reg Eglon Cup	Combe St Nicolas Colts	2026–27	Winner

== Divisional champions ==
The league has operated a number of divisions during its history. The Premier Division was formerly known as the Junior League, while Division One was formerly known as the Intermediate League. Divisions Three and Four have also operated during periods when the league contained a larger number of divisions.

== Premier Division (Formerly Junior League) ==
Year	Champions
1903–04	Perry Street Works
1904–05	Holyrood Mills
1905–06	Perry Street Works
1906–07	Holyrood Mills
1907–08	Combe St Nicholas
1908–09	Boden & Co.
1909–10	Boden & Co.
1910–11	Boden & Co.
1911–12	Axminster
1912–13	Bridport
1913–14	Petters United
1919–20	Axminster
1920–21	Axminster
1921–22	Axminster
1922–23	Bridport
1923–24	Crewkerne
1924–25	Crewkerne
1925–26	Ilminster
1926–27	Ilminster
1927–28	Perry Street

Year	Champions
1928–29	Perry Street
1929–30	Crewkerne
1930–31	Ilminster
1931–32	Bridport
1932–33	Ilminster
1933–34	Stoke-Under-Ham
1934–35	Stoke-Under-Ham
1935–36	Stoke-Under-Ham
1936–37	Stoke-Under-Ham
1937–38	Stoke-Under-Ham
1938–39	Ilminster
1939–40	Chard Town
1945–46	Westland Sports
1946–47	Ilminster
1947–48	Crewkerne
1948–49	Crewkerne
1949–50	Crewkerne
1950–51	Axminster
1951–52	Stoke-Under-Ham
1952–53	Stoke-Under-Ham

Year	Champions
1953–54	Stoke-Under-Ham
1954–55	Stoke-Under-Ham
1955–56	Chard Reserves
1956–57	Merriott
1957–58	Lyme Regis
1958–59	Ilminster Reserves
1959–60	Lyme Regis
1960–61	Crewkerne
1961–62	Shepton Beauchamp
1962–63	South Petherton
1963–64	South Petherton
1964–65	Shepton Beauchamp
1965–66	Shepton Beauchamp
1966–67	Perry Street & Yonder Hill
1967–68	Perry Street & Yonder Hill
1968–69	Perry Street & Yonder Hill
1969–70	Perry Street & Yonder Hill
1970–71	Merriott Rovers
1971–72	Merriott Rovers
1972–73	Drimpton

Year	Champions
1973–74	Merriott Rovers
1974–75	Haselbury
1975–76	Merriott Rovers
1976–77	Haselbury
1977–78	Haselbury
1978–79	Merriott Rovers
1979–80	Beaminster
1980–81	Merriott Rovers
1981–82	Shepton Beauchamp
1982–83	Shepton Beauchamp
1983–84	Shepton Beauchamp
1984–85	Shepton Beauchamp
1985–86	Misterton
1986–87	Misterton
1987–88	Misterton
1988–89	Lyme Regis
1989–90	Crewkerne
1990–91	Crewkerne
1991–92	Crewkerne
1992–93	Merriott Rovers

Year	Champions
1993–94	Merriott Rovers
1994–95	Combe St Nicholas
1995–96	Merriott Rovers
1996–97	Shepton Beauchamp
1997–98	Merriott Rovers
1998–99	Crewkerne
1999–2000	Merriott Rovers
2000–01	Combe St Nicholas
2001–02	Merriott Rovers
2002–03	Ilminster Reserves
2003–04	Merriott Rovers
2004–05	Lyme Regis
2005–06	South Petherton
2006–07	South Petherton
2007–08	South Petherton
2008–09	Crewkerne
2009–10	Lyme Regis
2010–11	South Petherton
2011–12	Lyme Regis
2012–13	Winsham United

Year	Champions
2013–14	Crewkerne Town
2014–15	Crewkerne Town
2015–16	Perry Street & Yonder Hill
2016–17	Barrington
2017–18	Barrington
2018–19	South Petherton
2021–22	South Petherton
2022–23	Forton Rangers
2023–24	Misterton
2024–25	Misterton
2025–26	Ilminster Town Reserves

== Division One (Formerly Intermediate League) ==
Year	Champions
1920–21	Winsham
1921–22	Boden & Co.
1922–23	Winsham
1923–24	Dalwood
1924–25	Winsham
1925–26	Crewkerne Units
1926–27	Perry Street Reserves
1927–28	Perry Street Reserves
1928–29	Martock
1929–30	Stoke-Under-Ham Reserves
1930–31	Lyme Bantams
1931–32	Dowlish wake
1932–33	Combe St Nicholas
1933–34	Combe St Nicholas
1934–35	Combe St Nicholas
1935–36	Stoke-Under-Ham Reserves
1936–37	Beaminster
1937–38	Norton-sub-hamdon
1938–39	Beaminster
1946–47	Norton-sub-hamdon

Year	Champions
1947–48	Norton-sub-hamdon
1948–49	Norton-sub-hamdon
1949–50	Ilton
1950–51	Barrington
1951–52	Chiselborough
1952–53	Barrington
1953–54	Chiselborough
1954–55	Chiselborough/Netherbury (Joint)
1955–56	Haselbury
1956–57	Haselbury
1957–58	Shepton Beauchamp
1958–59	Milwey Rise
1959–60	Broadwindsor
1960–61	Donyatt
1961–62	Lyme Regis Reserves
1962–63	Beaminster
1963–64	Norton-sub-hamdon
1964–65	Drimpton
1965–66	Milwey Rise
1966–67	Netherbury

Year	Champions
1967–68	Barrington
1968–69	Misterton
1969–70	Netherbury
1970–71	Chardstock
1971–72	Haselbury
1972–73	Chardex
1973–74	Donyatt
1974–75	Chard Working Mens Club
1975–76	Broadwindsor
1976–77	Misterton
1977–78	Swan, Crewkerne
1978–79	Perry Street & Yonder Hill
1979–80	Beaminster Reserves
1980–81	Merriott Rovers Reserves
1981–82	Misterton
1982–83	Dowlish & Donyatt
1983–84	Thorncombe
1984–85	Crewkerne Town
1985–86	South Petherton Reserves
1986–87	Combe St Nicholas

Year	Champions
1987–88	Shepton Beauchamp
1988–89	South Petherton
1989–90	Drimpton
1990–91	Norton Athletic
1991–92	Perry Street & Yonder Hill
1992–93	Hinton St George
1993–94	Forton Rangers
1994–95	Shepton Beauchamp
1995–96	Beaminster
1996–97	South Petherton
1997–98	Norton Athletic
1998–99	Lyme Regis Reserves
1999–2000	Lyme Regis Reserves
2000–01	Axminster Reserves
2001–02	Barrington
2002–03	Chard Colts
2003–04	Charmouth
2004–05	Perry Street
2005–06	Combe St Nicholas Reserves
2006–07	Winsham

Year	Champions
2007–08	Misterton
2008–09	Barrington
2009–10	Farway
2010–11	Crewkerne
2011–12	Milwey Rise
2012–13	Netherbury
2013–14	Perry Street Reserves
2014–15	Barrington
2015–16	Misterton
2016–17	Merriott Rovers
2017–18	Halstock
2018–19	Thorncombe
2021–22	Shepton Beauchamp
2022–23	South Petherton Reserves
2023–24	Ilminster Town Reserves
2024–25	West & Middle Chinnock
2025–26	South Petherton Reserves

== Division Two ==
Year	Champions
1961–62	Haselbury
1962–63	Misterton
1963–64	Shepton Beauchamp Reserves
1964–65	Combe St Nicholas Reserves
1965–66	Broadwindsor
1966–67	Barrington
1967–68	Perry Street & Yonder Hill
1968–69	Axmouth
1969–70	Chard Youth
1970–71	Haselbury
1971–72	Seavington
1972–73	Ilton
1973–74	Swan, Crewkerne
1974–75	Barrington
1975–76	Chard Wholesale & Meat Supply
1976–77	Chard Youth
1977–78	Beaminster Reserves
1978–79	Powrmatic
1979–80	Charmouth
1980–81	Dowlish & Donyatt

Year	Champions
1981–82	Seavington
1982–83	Chard Working Mens Reserves
1983–84	Crewkerne Town
1984–85	Powrmatic Sports, Ilminster
1985–86	Axmouth
1986–87	Forton Rangers
1987–88	Beaminster Reserves
1988–89	Drimpton
1989–90	Norton Athletic
1990–91	Crewkerne Reserves
1991–92	Combe St Nicholas Reserves
1992–93	Halstock
1993–94	Farway
1994–95	Lyme Regis Reserves
1995–96	Pymore
1996–97	Crewkerne Reserves
1997–98	Winsham
1998–99	Haselbury
1999–2000	Misterton
2000–01	Netherbury

Year	Champions
2001–02	Haselbury
2002–03	Uplyme
2003–04	Hinton St George
2004–05	Pymore
2005–06	Thorncombe
2006–07	Misterton
2007–08	Chard United
2008–09	Ilminster Colts
2009–10	Milwey Rise
2010–11	Ilminster Reserves
2011–12	Crewkerne Town Reserves
2012–13	Uplyme
2013–14	Chard United
2014–15	Drimpton
2015–16	South Petherton Reserves
2016–17	Halstock
2017–18	Thorncombe
2018–19	South Petherton Reserves
2021–22	Drimpton
2022–23	Yetminster United

Year	Champions
2023–24	Perry Street & Yonder Hill Reserves
2024–25	Merriott Moretti
2025–26	Netherbury

== Division Three ==
Year	Champions
1972–73	Swan, Crewkerne
1973–74	Haselbury Reserves
1974–75	Chard Wholesale Meat Supply Co
1975–76	Axmouth
1976–77	Farway
1977–78	Axminster Reserves
1978–79	Hinton St George Reserves
1979–80	Shepton Beauchamp Reserves
1980–81	Powrmatic Rangers
1981–82	Kilmington
1982–83	Crewkerne Town
1983–84	Powrmatic Sports
1984–85	South Petherton Reserves
1985–86	Happy Return Chard
1986–87	Beaminster Reserves
1987–88	Crewkerne Reserves
1988–89	Lyme Regis Reserves
1989–90	Combe St Nicholas Reserves
1990–91	South Petherton Reserves
1991–92	Misterton Reserves

Year	Champions
1992–93	Powrmatic Sports
1993–94	Drimpton
1994–95	Axminster 'A'
1995–96	Shepton Beauchamp Reserves
1996–97	Netherbury
1997–98	Haselbury
1998–99	Chard Town Colts
1999–2000	Seavington
2000–01	Norton Athletic Reserves
2001–02	Uplyme
2002–03	South Petherton Reserves
2003–04	Forton Reserves
2004–05	Winsham
2005–06	Dowlish & Donyatt
2006–07	Chard Town Colts
2007–08	White Horse Reserves
2008–09	Norton Athletic
2009–10	Hawkchurch
2010–11	Misterton Reserves
2011–12	Chard United

Year	Champions
2012–13	Luso Chard
2013–14	Lyme Regis Bantams
2014–15	Barrington Reserves
2015–16	Halstock
2016–17	Misterton Reserves
2017–18	Ilminster Town 'A'
2018–19	Lyme Regis Rovers
2021–22	Kingsbury Episcopi
2022–23	Yetminster United Reserves

== Division Four ==
Year	Champions
1986–87	Netherbury Reserves
1987–88	Perry Street & Yonder Hill
1988–89	Powrmatic Sports
1989–90	Hawkchurch
1990–91	Drimpton Reserves
1991–92	Powrmatic
1992–93	Combe St Nicholas 'A'
1993–94	Winsham Reserves
1994–95	Barrington Reserves
1995–96	Chard United Reserves
1996–97	Haselbury
1997–98	Combe St Nicholas Reserves
1998–99	Lyme Regis Bantams
1999–2000	Norton Athletic Reserves
2000–01	Ilminster Town 'A'
2001–02	Shepton Beauchamp Reserves
2002–03	White Horse Symondsbury
2003–04	Barrington Reserves
2004–05	White Horse Symondsbury
2005–06	Combe St Nicholas 'B'

Year	Champions
2006–07	Beaminster Reserves
2007–08	Lyme Bantams
2008–09	Fivehead United
2009–10	Chard United Reserves
2010–11	West & Middle Chinnock Reserves
2011–12	Ilminster Town 'A'
2012–13	Shepton Beauchamp Reserves
2013–14	Kingsbury Episcopi
2014–15	Merriott Rovers

== Trophy/cup competitions ==
Cup competitions have formed part of the Perry Street & District League for much of its history. The league's principal knockout competition, the Perry Street Challenge Cup, was founded in 1912, with the trophy presented by league founder C. E. Small. Further competitions were subsequently established as the league developed, with a number of trophies presented by individuals and member clubs.

All cup competitions, except the Chard Hospital Cup, are governed by the rules of the Perry Street Challenge Cup.

Premier Division

The Perry Street Challenge Cup
Founded 1912.
Cup presented by C. E. Small Esq.

Coronation Cup
Founded 1953.
Cup presented by C. H. Baulch Esq.

Division One

Division One Cup
Founded 1954.
Cup presented by C. H. Harris Esq.

The Arthur Gage Memorial Cup
Founded 1950.

Division Two

Jack Venn Cup
Founded 1961.
Formerly known as the Division Two Cup.
Cup presented by J. V. Venn Esq.

Reg Eglon Cup
Founded 1986.
Cup presented by Misterton Football Club.

Rotational cups

Following the reduction in the number of league divisions, a number of established cup competitions have been retained and are used on a rotational basis.

John Fowler Trophy
Founded 1973.
Cup presented by Halstock Football Club.

Bill Bailey Cup
Founded 1973.
Cup presented by Beaminster Football Club.

John Adams Cup
Founded 2025.
The cup was established in memory of John Adams, a long-standing president of Forton Football Club and one of the original founders of the club. The cup final is held at Forton Rangers FC. Axminster Town 3rds became the inaugural winners in 2025–26.

Other cups

Chard Hospital Cup
Founded in 1965.
Open to clubs as decided by the Management Committee. The competition has a charitable purpose. Entry fees are donated to the Chard & District Hospital League of Friends, while the net proceeds from the final's gate receipts are also donated to the organisation.

Ken Hodges Cup
Founded in 1987

The Daisy Hutchings Memorial Cup
Founded 1970.
Originally open to clubs in Divisions Two and Three of the Perry Street & District League, with clubs permitted to enter one team.

The Tommy Tabberer Cup
Founded in 1962.
The competition was handed back to Lyme Regis FC following the 2022–23 season. The club now honours the cup as a pre-season tournament.

== Arthur Gage Memorial Cup ==
Season	Winner
1950–51	Barrington
1951–52	Shepton Beauchamp
1952–53	Shepton Beauchamp
1953–54	Beer Reserves
1954–55	Beer Reserves
1955–56	Netherbury
1956–57	Haselbury
1957–58	Beaminster
1958–59	Millwey Rise
1959–60	Broadwindsor
1960–61	Crewkerne Reserves
1961–62	Crewkerne Reserves
1962–63	Charmouth
1963–64	Stoke-Under-Ham Reserves
1964–65	Misterton
1965–66	Winsham
1966–67	Donyatt
1967–68	Barrington
1968–69	Upottery
1969–70	Upottery

Season	Winner
1970–71	Chardstock
1971–72	Ilton
1972–73	Broadwindsor
1973–74	Chard Youth
1974–75	Netherbury
1975–76	Broadwindsor
1976–77	Seavington
1977–78	Swan, Crewkerne
1978–79	Beaminster Reserves
1979–80	Chard Youth
1980–81	Merriott Rovers Reserves
1981–82	Dowlish & Donyatt
1982–83	Seavington
1983–84	Broadwindsor
1984–85	Crewkerne Town
1985–86	South Petherton Reserves
1986–87	Thorncombe
1987–88	Shepton Beauchamp
1988–89	Pymore
1989–90	Axmouth

Season	Winner
1990–91	Norton Athletic
1991–92	Crewkerne Reserves
1992–93	Crewkerne Reserves
1993–94	Combe St Nicholas Reserves
1994–95	Shepton Beauchamp Reserves
1995–96	Barrington
1996–97	Axminster Reserves
1997–98	Ilminster Town Reserves
1998–99	Crewkerne Reserves
1999–2000	Drimpton
2000–01	Combe St Nicholas Reserves
2001–02	Drimpton
2002–03	Lyme Regis Reserves
2003–04	Beaminster
2004–05	Perry Street
2005–06	Lyme Regis Reserves
2006–07	Chard Rangers
2007–08	Merriott Rovers Reserves
2008–09	Pymore
2009–10	Lyme Regis Reserves

Season	Winner
2010–11	Winsham
2011–12	Shepton Beauchamp
2012–13	West & Middle Chinnock
2013–14	Perry Street Reserves
2014–15	Barrington
2015–16	Misterton
2016–17	Forton Rangers
2017–18	Waytown Hounds
2018–19	Hawkchurch
2021–22	Shepton Beauchamp
2022–23	South Petherton Reserves
2023–24	Not run
2024–25	West & Middle Chinnock
2025–26	West & Middle Chinnock
2026–27	Easter 27

== Bill Bailey ==
Season	Winner
1972–73	Chard Working Men's Club
1973–74	Haselbury Reserves
1974–75	Chaffcombe
1975–76	Axmouth
1976–77	Dowlish & Donyatt
1977–78	Misterton Reserves
1978–79	Pymore
1979–80	Chard Working Men's Club
1980–81	Powermatic Rangers
1981–82	Halstock
1982–83	Axminster
1983–84	Powermatic Ilminster
1984–85	Axmouth
1985–86	Dowlish & Donyatt Reserves
1986–87	Shepton Beauchamp
1987–88	C & K Wadeford
1988–89	Lyme Regis Reserves
1989–90	Powermatic Sports
1990–91	South Petherton Reserves
1991–92	Norton Reserves

Season	Winner
1992–93	Powrmatic Reserves
1993–94	Drimpton
1994–95	Uplyme
1995–96	Netherbury
1996–97	Chard Town 'A' Reserves
1997–98	Dowlish & Donyatt
1998–99	Axminster 'A'
1999–2000	Seavington
2000–01	Lyme Regis Bantams
2001–02	Chard United Reserves
2002–03	South Petherton Reserves
2003–04	Winsham
2004–05	Chard Rangers Reserves
2005–06	Hawkchurch
2006–07	Ilminster Colts
2007–08	Beaminster Reserves
2008–09	Luso Chard
2009–10	Fivehead
2010–11	Crewkerne Reserves
2011–12	Combe St Nicholas 'A'

Season	Winner
2012–13	Combe St Nicholas 'A'
2013–14	Hawkchurch
2014–15	Hawkchurch
2015–16	Perry Street Reserves
2016–17	Lyme Rovers
2017–18	Donyatt United
2018–19	Ilminster Town B
2021–22	Kingsbury Episcopi
2022–23	Chard United 'A'
2023–24	Not run
2024–25	Merriott Moretti
2025–26	Merriott Moretti
2026–27	Easter 27

== Challenge Cup ==
Season	Winner
1911–12	Yeovil Reserves
1912–13	Yeovil Reserves
1913–14	Crewkerne Wanderer/Boden & Co.
1919–20	Chard Comrades
1920–21	Stoke-Under-Ham
1921–22	Stoke-Under-Ham
1922–23	Axminster
1923–24	Bridport
1924–25	Seaton
1925–26	Perry Street
1926–27	Seaton
1927–28	Ilminster
1928–29	Weston Sports
1929–30	Perry Street
1930–31	Chard
1931–32	Montacute
1932–33	Ilminster
1933–34	Stoke-Under-Ham
1934–35	Stoke-Under-Ham
1935–36	Stoke-Under-Ham

Season	Winner
1936–37	Ilminster
1937–38	Chard
1938–39	Ilminster
1939–40	Axminster
1945–46	RAF Merryfield
1946–47	Ilminster
1947–48	Crewkerne
1948–49	Crewkerne
1949–50	Axminster
1950–51	Winsham
1951–52	Stoke-Under-Ham
1952–53	Barrington
1953–54	Stoke-Under-Ham
1954–55	Stoke-Under-Ham
1955–56	Barrington
1956–57	Chard Reserves
1957–58	Chard Res/Lyme Regis (Joint)
1958–59	Ilminster Reserves
1959–60	Perry Street
1960–61	Shepton Beauchamp

Season	Winner
1961–62	Shepton Beauchamp
1962–63	Crewkerne
1963–64	South Petherton
1964–65	Shepton Beauchamp
1965–66	Shepton Beauchamp
1966–67	Perry Street & Yonder Hill
1967–68	Perry Street & Yonder Hill
1968–69	Perry Street & Yonder Hill
1969–70	Chard Town Reserves
1970–71	Merriott Rovers
1971–72	Merriott Rovers
1972–73	Merriott Rovers
1973–74	Haselbury
1974–75	Merriott Rovers
1975–76	Merriott Rovers
1976–77	South Petherton
1977–78	Haselbury
1978–79	Beaminster
1979–80	Axminster
1980–81	Beaminster

Season	Winner
1981–82	Shepton Beauchamp
1982–83	Shepton Beauchamp
1983–84	Lyme Regis
1984–85	Shepton Beauchamp
1985–86	Shepton Beauchamp
1986–87	Lyme Regis
1987–88	Beaminster
1988–89	Crewkerne
1989–90	Combe St Nicholas
1990–91	Misterton
1991–92	Misterton
1992–93	Axminster
1993–94	Merriott Rovers
1994–95	Combe St Nicholas
1995–96	Combe St Nicholas
1996–97	Combe St Nicholas
1997–98	Combe St Nicholas
1998–99	Combe St Nicholas
1999–2000	Combe St Nicholas
2000–01	Norton Athletic

Season	Winner
2001–02	Combe St Nicholas
2002–03	Combe St Nicholas Reserves
2003–04	Merriott Rovers
2004–05	Merriott Rovers
2005–06	Lyme Regis
2006–07	Lyme Regis
2007–08	Perry Street
2008–09	Combe St Nicholas Reserves
2009–10	Lyme Regis
2010–11	Combe St Nicholas Reserves
2011–12	Lyme Regis
2012–13	Winsham United
2013–14	Crewkerne Town
2014–15	Crewkerne Town
2015–16	South Petherton
2016–17	Shepton Beauchamp
2017–18	Chard United
2018–19	Winsham United
2019–20	Void
2020–21	Void

Season	Winner
2021–22	Chard United
2022–23	Forton Rangers
2023–24	Misterton
2024–25	Ilchester
2025–26	West & Middle Chinnock
2026–27	Easter 27

== Chard Hospital Cup ==
Season	Winner
1964–65	Chard Town
1965–66	Perry Street & Yonder Hill
1966–67	Chard Town
1967–68	Perry Street & Yonder Hill
1968–69	Merriott Rovers
1969–70	Chard Town
1970–71	Merriott Rovers
1971–72	Chard Town
1972–73	Ilminster
1973–74	Merriott Rovers
1974–75	Haselbury
1975–76	Shepton Beauchamp
1976–77	Merriott Rovers
1978–79	Drimpton
1979–80	Chard Youth
1980–81	Shepton Beauchamp
1981–82	Shepton Beauchamp
1982–83	Shepton Beauchamp
1983–84	Shepton Beauchamp
1984–85	Shepton Beauchamp

Season	Winner
1985–86	Misterton
1986–87	Misterton
1987–88	Misterton
1988–89	South Petherton
1989–90	Forton Rangers
1990–91	South Petherton
1991–92	Crewkerne
1992–93	Combe St Nicholas
1993–94	Merriott Rovers
1994–95	Crewkerne
1995–96	Crewkerne
1996–97	Lyme Regis
1997–98	Crewkerne
1998–99	Crewkerne
1999–2000	Combe St Nicholas
2000–01	Shepton Beauchamp
2001–02	Chard United
2002–03	Merriott Rovers
2003–04	Ilminster Reserves
2004–05	South Petherton

Season	Winner
2005–06	South Petherton
2006–07	South Petherton
2007–08	Perry Street
2008–09	Lyme Regis
2009–10	South Petherton
2010–11	Lyme Regis
2011–12	Millwey Rise
2012–13	Winsham United
2013–14	South Petherton
2014–15	Shepton Beauchamp
2015–16	Shepton Beauchamp
2016–17	South Petherton
2017–18	Shepton Beauchamp
2018–19	Thorncombe
2019–20	Winsham United
2020–21	Void
2021–22	South Petherton
2022–23	Forton Rangers
2023–24	South Petherton
2024–25	Combe St Nicholas Reserves

Season	Winner
2025–26	Combe St Nicholas Reserves
2026–27	Chard United

== Coronation Cup ==
Season	Winner
1952–53	6. Trg. Bn. R.A.S.C.
1953–54	6. Trg. Bn. R.A.S.C.
1954–55	Stoke-Under-Ham
1955–56	Chard Reserves
1956–57	Chard Reserves
1957–58	Ilminster Reserves
1958–59	Ilminster Reserves
1959–60	Lyme Regis
1960–61	Crewkerne
1961–62	Shepton Beauchamp
1962–63	Crewkerne
1963–64	Crewkerne
1964–65	Shepton Beauchamp
1965–66	Chard Town Reserves
1966–67	Perry Street & Yonder Hill
1967–68	Merriott
1968–69	Drimpton
1969–70	Merriott Rovers
1970–71	Perry Street & Yonder Hill
1971–72	Merriott

Season	Winner
1972–73	Combe St Nicholas
1973–74	Haselbury
1974–75	Merriott Rovers
1975–76	Haselbury
1976–77	South Petherton
1978–79	South Petherton
1979–80	Lyme Regis
1980–81	Chard Working Men's Club
1981–82	Beaminster
1982–83	Shepton Beauchamp
1983–84	Shepton Beauchamp
1984–85	Shepton Beauchamp
1985–86	Misterton
1986–87	Misterton
1987–88	Lyme Regis
1988–89	Misterton
1989–90	Crewkerne
1990–91	Misterton
1991–92	Merriott Rovers
1992–93	Crewkerne

Season	Winner
1993–94	Crewkerne
1994–95	Lyme Regis
1995–96	Shepton Beauchamp
1996–97	Combe St Nicholas
1997–98	Lyme Regis
1998–99	Merriott Rovers
1999–2000	Axminster
2000–01	Combe St Nicholas
2001–02	Merriott Rovers
2002–03	Merriott Rovers
2003–04	Forton Rangers
2004–05	Lyme Regis
2005–06	South Petherton
2006–07	Merriott Rovers
2007–08	White Horse
2008–09	Combe Reserves
2009–10	Lyme Regis
2010–11	Lyme Regis
2011–12	Lyme Regis
2012–13	Crewkerne Town

Season	Winner
2013–14	Millwey Rise
2014–15	Shepton Beauchamp
2015–16	Perry Street & Yonder Hill
2016–17	Beaminster
2017–18	Winsham United
2018–19	Winsham United
2019–20	Donyatt United
2020–21	Void
2021–22	Misterton
2022–23	Perry Street & Yonder Hill
2023–24	Yetminster United
2024–25	Forton Rangers
2025–26	Misterton
2026–27	Xmas 26

== Division One Cup ==
Season	Winner
1954–55	Haselbury/Seavington (Joint)
1955–56	Seavington
1956–57	Dalwood
1957–58	Lyme Regis Reserves
1958–59	Millwey Rise
1959–60	Netherbury
1960–61	Merriott
1961–62	Crewkerne Reserves
1962–63	Beaminster
1963–64	Norton Sub Hamdon
1964–65	Drimpton
1965–66	Chard Youth Club
1966–67	Drimpton
1967–68	Barrington
1968–69	Axminster Reserves
1969–70	Netherbury
1970–71	Chardstock
1971–72	Haselbury
1972–73	Chardex
1973–74	Misterton

Season	Winner
1974–75	Swan, Crewkerne
1975–76	Broadwindsor
1976–77	Seavington
1977–78	Swan, Crewkerne
1978–79	South Petherton Reserves
1979–80	Winsham
1980–81	Merriott Rovers Reserves
1981–82	Dowlish & Donyatt
1982–83	Dowlish & Donyatt
1983–84	Broadwindsor
1984–85	North Coker
1985–86	Chard Youth Club
1986–87	Thorncombe
1987–88	Forton Rangers
1988–89	Forton Rangers
1989–90	Axmouth
1990–91	Haselbury
1991–92	Crewkerne Reserves
1992–93	Winsham
1993–94	Forton Rangers

Season	Winner
1994–95	Shepton Beauchamp
1995–96	Perry Street
1996–97	Ilminster Reserves
1997–98	Norton Athletic
1998–99	Axminster Reserves
1999–2000	Crewkerne Reserves
2000–01	Axminster Reserves
2001–02	Lyme Regis Reserves
2002–03	Perry Street
2003–04	Combe St Nicholas Reserves
2004–05	Perry Street
2005–06	White Horse
2006–07	Chard United
2007–08	Misterton
2008–09	West & Middle Chinnock
2009–10	Ilminster Colts
2010–11	Crewkerne
2011–12	Millwey Rise
2012–13	Netherbury
2013–14	Perry Street Reserves

Season	Winner
2014–15	Barrington
2015–16	Drimpton
2016–17	Forton Rangers
2017–18	Waytown Hounds
2018–19	Ilminster Town Reserves
2019–20	Void
2020–21	Void
2021–22	Shepton Beauchamp
2022–23	South Petherton Reserves
2023–24	Forton Rangers Reserves
2024–25	Not run
2025–26	Merriott Moretti
2026–27	Easter 27

== Jack Venn Cup ==
Season	Winner
1961–62	Beaminster
1962–63	Misterton
1963–64	Millwey Rise
1964–65	Millwey Rise
1965–66	Norton Sub Hamdon
1966–67	Thorncombe
1967–68	Misterton Reserves
1968–69	Axmouth
1969–70	Halstock
1970–71	Haselbury
1971–72	Seavington
1972–73	Ilton
1973–74	North Coker
1974–75	Haselbury Reserves
1975–76	Shepton Beauchamp Reserves
1976–77	Hinton St George
1977–78	Perry Street Reserves
1978–79	Axmouth
1979–80	Charmouth
1980–81	Dowlish & Donyatt

Season	Winner
1981–82	Fivehead Rangers
1982–83	Barrington
1983–84	Pymore
1984–85	Farway
1985–86	Axmouth
1986–87	Misterton Reserves
1987–88	Halstock
1988–89	Drimpton
1989–90	Lyme Regis Reserves
1990–91	Winsham
1991–92	Farway
1992–93	Halstock
1993–94	Farway
1994–95	Chard United
1995–96	Axmouth
1996–97	Chard Youth Club
1997–98	Combe St Nicholas Reserves
1998–99	Haselbury
1999–2000	Chard Town Colts
2000–01	Netherbury

Season	Winner
2001–02	Chard Youth Club
2002–03	Millwey Rise
2003–04	Hinton St George
2004–05	Pymore
2005–06	Millwey Rise
2006–07	Millwey Rise
2007–08	Chard United
2008–09	Perry Street Reserves
2009–10	Millwey Rise
2010–11	Shepton Beauchamp
2011–12	Dowlish & Donyatt
2012–13	Uplyme
2013–14	Thorncombe
2014–15	Drimpton
2015–16	Merriott Rovers
2016–17	Halstock
2017–18	Crewkerne Rangers
2018–19	South Petherton Reserves
2019–20	Void
2020–21	Void

Season	Winner
2021–22	Drimpton
2022–23	Yetminster United
2023–24	Perry Street Reserves
2024–25	Not run
2025–26	Netherbury
2026–27	Not run

== John Adams Cup ==
Season	Winner
2025–26	Axminster Town 3rds
2026–27	Not run

== John Fowler Cup ==
Season	Winner
1972–73	Swan, Crewkerne
1973–74	Uplyme Reserves
1974–75	Chard Wholesale Meat Supply
1975–76	Axmouth
1976–77	Axminster
1977–78	Misterton Reserves
1978–79	Melplash
1979–80	Bradfords, Crewkerne
1980–81	Drimpton Reserves
1981–82	Pymore
1982–83	Crewkerne Town
1983–84	Powrmatic Ilminster
1984–85	Axminster
1985–86	Dowlish & Donyatt Reserves
1986–87	Lyme Regis Reserves
1987–88	Charmouth
1988–89	Lyme Regis Reserves
1989–90	Merriott Reserves
1990–91	Merriott Reserves
1991–92	Misterton Reserves

Season	Winner
1992–93	Drimpton Reserves
1993–94	Drimpton
1994–95	Axminster 'A'
1995–96	Hinton St George Reserves
1996–97	Uplyme
1997–98	Haselbury
1998–99	Axminster 'A'
1999–2000	Seavington
2000–01	Axminster 'A'
2001–02	Chard Rangers
2002–03	Drimpton Reserves
2003–04	Thorncombe
2004–05	Thorncombe
2005–06	Dowlish & Donyatt
2006–07	Ilminster Colts
2007–08	Beaminster Reserves
2008–09	Norton Athletic
2009–10	Crewkerne Rangers
2010–11	Winsham Reserves
2011–12	Waytown Hounds

Season	Winner
2012–13	Millwey Rise Reserves
2013–14	Drimpton
2014–15	Hawkchurch
2015–16	Dowlish & Donyatt
2016–17	Misterton Reserves
2017–18	Donyatt United
2018–19	Lyme Regis Rovers
2019–20	Void
2020–21	Void
2021–22	Uplyme Reserves
2022–23	Barrington Reserves
2023–24	Not run
2024–25	West & Middle Chinnock
2025–26	Not run
2026–27	Combe St Nicholas A

== Reg Eglon Cup ==
Season	Winner
1986–87	Crewkerne 'A'
1987–88	Crewkerne 'A'
1988–89	Powmatic Sports
1989–90	Pymore Reserves
1990–91	Charmouth
1991–92	Crewkerne Colts
1992–93	Barrington Reserves
1993–94	Forton Rangers Reserves
1994–95	Barrington Reserves
1995–96	Forton Rangers Reserves
1996–97	Combe St Nicholas 'A'
1997–98	Seaton 'A'
1998–99	Norton Athletic Reserves
1999–2000	Norton Athletic Reserves
2000–01	Shepton Beauchamp Reserves
2001–02	White Horse Symondsbury
2002–03	Barrington Reserves
2003–04	Netherbury Reserves
2004–05	Chard Town Colts
2005–06	Fivehead United

Season	Winner
2006–07	Netherbury Reserves
2007–08	Misterton Reserves
2008–09	Crewkerne Rangers
2009–10	Thorncombe Reserves
2010–11	Waytown Hounds
2011–12	Ilminster Town 'A'
2012–13	Crewkerne Rangers Reserves
2013–14	Kingsbury Episcopi
2014–15	Merriott Dynamos
2015–16	Combe 'B'
2016–17	Uplyme Reserves
2017–18	Forton Rangers Reserves
2018–19	Dowlish & Donyatt
2019–20	Donyatt United
2020–21	Void
2021–22	Perry Street & Yonder Hill
2022–23	Yetminster United Reserves
2023–24	Forton Rangers A Team
2024–25	Uplyme
2025–26	Netherbury

Season	Winner
2026–27	Combe St Nicolas Colts

== List of former league cup winners ==
Season	Daisy Hutchings Memorial Cup
1971–72	Perry Street & Yonder Hill
1972–73	Haselbury
1973–74	Merriott Rovers
1974–75	Haselbury
1975–76	Merriott Rovers
1976–77	Merriott Rovers
1977–78	Haselbury
1978–79	Haselbury
1979–80	Shepton Beauchamp
1980–81	Shepton Beauchamp
1981–82	Shepton Beauchamp
1982–83	Shepton Beauchamp
1983–84	Shepton Beauchamp
1984–85	Shepton Beauchamp
1985–86	Misterton
1986–87	Misterton
1987–88	Misterton
1988–89	Drimpton
1989–90	South Petherton
1990–91	Forton Rangers
1991–92	Combe St Nicholas
1992–93	Crewkerne
1993–94	Crewkerne Reserves
1994–95	Beaminster
1995–96	Merriott Rovers Reserves
1996–97	Pymore
1997–98	Crewkerne Reserves
1998–99	Lyme Regis Reserves
1999–2000	Crewkerne Reserves
2000–01	Chard United
2001–02	Ilminster Town Reserves
2002–03	Chard Colts
2003–04	Drimpton
2004–05	Perry Street
2005–06	White Horse
2006–07	Misterton
2007–08	Misterton
2008–09	Millwey Rise
2009–10	West & Middle Chinnock
2010–11	South Petherton Reserves
2011–12	Millwey Rise Reserves
2012–13	Combe St Nicholas 'A'
2013–14	Forton Rangers Reserves
2014–15	Merriott Rovers
2015–16	Misterton
2016–17	Forton Rangers Reserves
2017–18	Thorncombe
2018–19	Forton Rangers
2019–20	Void
2020–21	Void
2021–22	Not run
2022–23	Not run

Season	Ken Hodges Cup
1986–87	Crewkerne 'A'
1987–88	Perry Street & Yonder Hill Reserves
1992–93	Farway Reserves
1993–94	Chard Town 'A' Reserves
1994–95	Chard United Reserves
1995–96	Dowlish & Donyatt
1996–97	Haselbury
1997–98	Forton Rangers Reserves
1998–99	Misterton Reserves
1999–2000	Norton Athletic Reserves
2000–01	Ilminster 'A'
2001–02	Shepton Beauchamp Reserves
2002–03	Chard Rangers Reserves
2003–04	Millwey Rise Reserves
2004–05	Chard Colts
2005–06	Millwey Rise Reserves
2006–07	Farway Reserves
2007–08	Misterton Reserves
2008–09	FC First (Taunton)
2009–10	Ilminster Town 'A'
2010–11	Combe St Nicholas 'B'
2011–12	Lyme Regis Bantams
2012–13	Shepton Beauchamp Reserves
2013–14	Merriott Dynamos
2014–15	Merriott Rovers
2015–16	Halstock
2016–17	Farway United
2017–18	Forton Rangers
2018–19	Uplyme
2019–20	Void
2020–21	Void
2021–22	Not run
2022–23	Chard United 'A'

Season	Tommy Tabberer Cup
1961–62	Haselbury
1962–63	Stoke-Under-Ham Reserves
1963–64	South Petherton Reserves
1964–65	Barrington
1965–66	Broadwindsor
1966–67	Crewkerne Reserves
1967–68	Perry Street & Yonder Hill Reserves
1968–69	Axmouth
1969–70	Halstock
1970–71	Haselbury
1971–72	Chardex
1972–73	Ilton
1973–74	Chard Working Men's Club
1974–75	Haselbury Reserves
1975–76	Chard Wholesale Meat Supply Co
1976–77	Beaminster Reserves
1977–78	Farway
1978–79	Barrington
1979–80	Charmouth
1980–81	Dowlish & Donyatt
1981–82	Chard Working Men's Club Reserves
1982–83	Barrington
1983–84	Fivehead Rangers
1984–85	Kilmington
1985–86	Halstock
1986–87	Millwey Rise
1987–88	Millwey Rise
1988–89	Haselbury / Hinton St George (Joint)
1989–90	Norton Athletic
1990–91	Crewkerne Reserves
1991–92	Combe St Nicholas Reserves
1992–93	Axminster Reserves
1993–94	Axminster Reserves
1994–95	Lyme Regis Reserves
1995–96	Axmouth
1996–97	Crewkerne Reserves
1997–98	Combe St Nicholas Reserves
1998–99	Drimpton
1999–2000	Chard Youth Club
2000–01	Chard Town Colts
2001–02	Haselbury
2002–03	Uplyme
2003–04	Hinton St George
2004–05	Ilminster Town Colts
2005–06	Winsham
2006–07	Misterton
2007–08	Perry Street Reserves
2008–09	Perry Street Reserves
2009–10	Dowlish & Donyatt
2010–11	Shepton Beauchamp
2011–12	Uplyme
2012–13	Chard United
2013–14	Thorncombe
2014–15	Beaminster Reserves
2015–16	Merriott Rovers
2016–17	Farway United
2017–18	Crewkerne Rangers
2018–19	Forton Rangers Reserves
2019–20	Void
2020–21	Void
2021–22	Charmouth
2022–23	Yetminster United
