= Greg Lincoln =

English footballer (born 1980)

Personal information
- Full name: Greg Dean Lincoln
- Date of birth: 23 March 1980 (age 46)
- Place of birth: Cheshunt, England
- Position: Midfielder

Youth career
- 1996–1998: Arsenal

Senior career*
| Years | Team | Apps | (Gls) |
| 1998–2001 | Arsenal | 0 | (0) |
| 2001 | Torquay United | 0 | (0) |
| 2002–2004 | Northampton Town | 19 | (1) |
| 2004–2005 | Redbridge | 24 | (3) |
| 2005 | Chelmsford City | 17 | (2) |
| 2005–2007 | Cambridge City | 52 | (3) |
| 2007–2009 | Thurrock | 70 | (12) |

Managerial career
- 2010–2011: Thurrock
- 2012–2023: Arsenal Youth Team
- 2022–2023: England U16
- 2023–2024: England U17
- 2024–2025: England U16
- * Club domestic league appearances and goals

Greg Lincoln (born 23 March 1980) is an English professional football coach and a former professional footballer.

== Career ==
Lincoln was born in Cheshunt, Hertfordshire. He began his career as a trainee with Arsenal.

On 14 September 2001 he joined Torquay United on non-contract terms along with his former Arsenal colleague Lee Canoville. He left Plainmoor soon after joining, and joined Swedish side Hammarby IF on trial after a recommendation from both Freddie Ljungberg and Liam Brady who knew him from his Highbury days. Serendipitously, Greg Lincoln later went onto coach alongside Freddie Ljungberg at Arsenal Youth Level. Then in June 2002, Lincoln joined Northampton Town, making his league debut on 29 October 2002 as a second-half substitute for Marco Gabbiadini in Northampton's 4–0 defeat away to Oldham Athletic. Lincoln remained with Northampton until May 2004 when he was released. He scored once during his spell at Northampton, his goal coming in a 1–1 draw with Boston United in December 2003.

In August 2004 signed for Redbridge and joined Chelmsford City in June 2005, but in December 2005 moved to Cambridge City.

In May 2007, Lincoln joined Conference South side Thurrock.

Then on 16 August 2022, Lincoln was appointed as Head Coach of the England U16s. The same year he was part of Ian Foster's backroom staff as England U19s were triumphant in the 2022 edition of the U19 European Championships, beating Israel (3–1 AET) at the Anton Malatinský Stadium. The victorious team including the likes of Liam Delap, Jarell Quansah, Aaron Ramsey & Jamie Bynoe-Gittens. On 18 August 2023, he moved up to take charge of the England U17s. On 23 August 2024, Lincoln moved back across to take charge of the England U16s

On 19 June 2025, it was confirmed that Lincoln was to leave his role at The FA to allow him to 'explore new coaching and leadership opportunities within the game'.

Later that summer, Lincoln was appointed as Head of Coaching and Player Development at West Ham United's academy. In October 2025, Lincoln stepped in as interim head coach of West Ham's U21s following the promotion of academy staff to the first team under Nuno Espírito Santo.

== Honours ==
Arsenal

- FA Premier Youth League: 1998
