= Magno Vieira =

Brazilian footballer

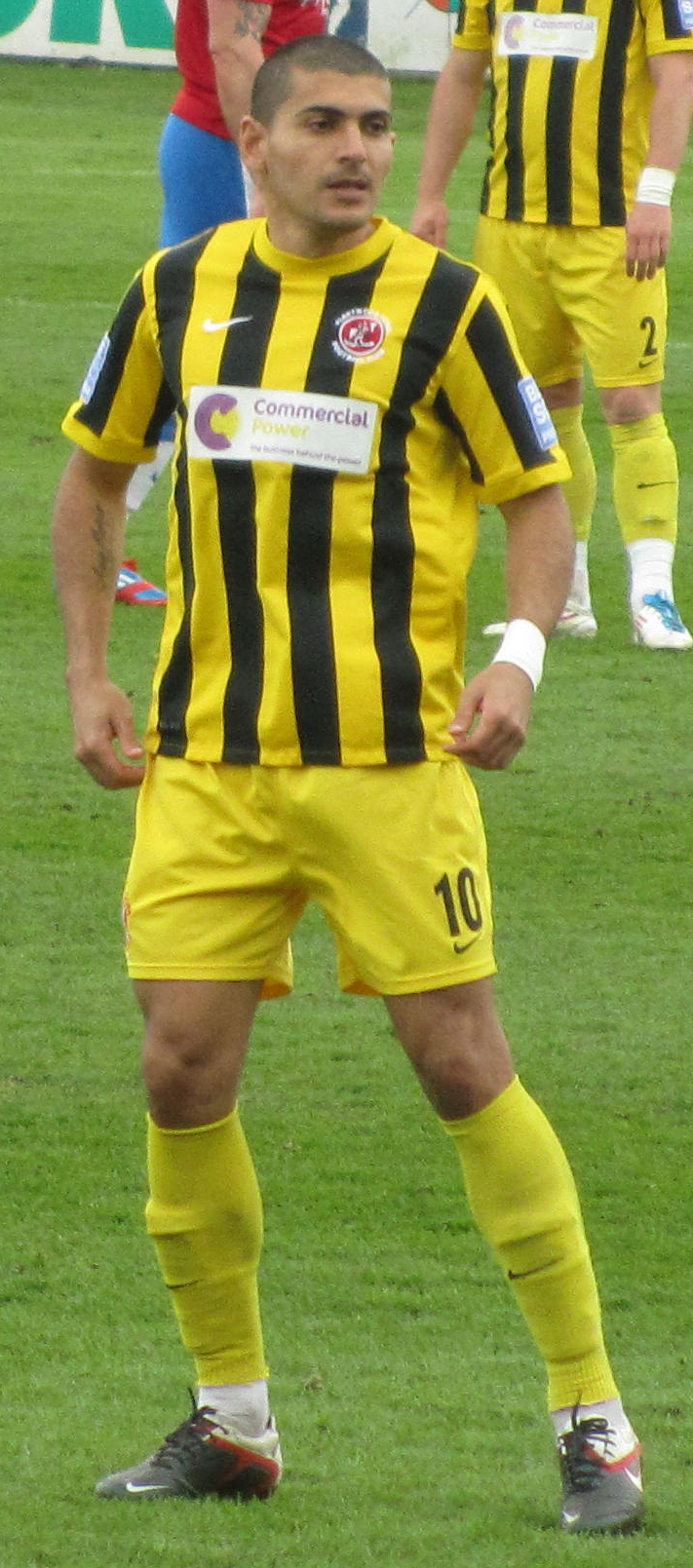

Personal information
- Full name: Magno Silva Vieira
- Date of birth: 13 February 1985 (age 41)
- Place of birth: Brasília, DF, Brazil
- Height: 5 ft 11 in (1.80 m)
- Position: Striker

Team information
- Current team: Kapiti Coast United

Senior career*
Years	Team	Apps	(Gls)
2003–2005	Wigan Athletic	0	(0)
2004	→ Northampton Town (loan)	10	(2)
2004–2005	→ Carlisle United (loan)	35	(10)
2006–2007	Barnet	21	(3)
2007–2008	Crawley Town	22	(5)
2008	→ Cambridge United (loan)	10	(2)
2008–2009	Wycombe Wanderers	14	(2)
2009–2010	Ebbsfleet United	41	(16)
2010–2012	Fleetwood Town	64	(31)
2012–2015	Forest Green Rovers	49	(5)
2014	→ Nuneaton Town (loan)	2	(0)
2015	Wairarapa United	?	(?)
2016–	Team Wellington	6	(1)
2016–2018	Kapiti Coast United	?	(?)
2019	North Wellington	?	(?)
2020	Paekakariki Central	1	(0)

Managerial career
- 2018: Kapiti Coast United
- 2019–2020: North Wellington
- * Club domestic league appearances and goals as of 12:42, 15 September 2017 (UTC)

Magno Silva Vieira (born 13 February 1985) is a former Brazilian footballer who was most recently manager of Central Premier League club North Wellington. Having started his career with Wigan Athletic, he has represented the likes of Barnet, Wycombe Wanderers, Fleetwood Town and Forest Green Rovers.

== Career ==
Born in Brasília, Distrito Federal, Vieira started his career in England with Wigan Athletic in 2003 but failed to get into the first team and went out on loan to Northampton Town and Carlisle United. While on loan to Carlisle, Vieira became a cult figure when he scored some important goals, most notably when he scored a hat-trick away at Aldershot Town in a 5–0 win.

He left Wigan in 2005 and was to join Carlisle permanently, after playing an important part in their return to The Football League, but passport problems prevented him playing.

Following a year out of football, Vieira in 2006 signed for Barnet. He spent one year at Underhill, being released in May 2007.

After his release by Barnet, Vieira signed for Crawley Town in June, becoming one of Steve Evans' first signings for the club.

On 6 March 2008, Vieira was allowed to join Cambridge United on loan for the remainder of the 2007–08 season.

He was signed by Wycombe Wanderers on a one-year deal on 30 June, before being released at the end of the season on 6 May 2009.

Vieira joined Conference side Ebbsfleet United on 7 August on a one-year contract. He won the January Conference National Player of the Month award, after scoring five goals in five games. He also won the club's Supporters Player of the Year award for the 2009–10 season, which he finished with 42 appearances and 16 goals.

Vieira arrived in New Zealand in July 2010 to trial with the Wellington-based A-League side the Wellington Phoenix ahead of the 2010–11 A-League season.

On 22 July 2010 Vieira signed for newly promoted Conference National team Fleetwood Town, scoring on league debut at Rushden & Diamonds. In his first season there he helped the club reach the play-offs and was their highest goalscorer with 22 league goals while in his second season at the club Vieira helped Fleetwood to promotion to the Football League as Conference champions.

In late April 2012, it was confirmed that Vieira had entered into talks with Forest Green Rovers ahead of a potential move to the Conference club. It was confirmed he had joined the club in early May on a free transfer, signing a three-year contract.

On 11 August 2012, Vieira made his debut for Forest Green in a 1–1 draw against his former club Cambridge United. He scored his first goal for Forest Green on 25 August 2012 in a 3–1 home win against Woking. On 1 August 2014, he joined Forest Green's division rivals Nuneaton Town on a one-month loan deal after falling down the pecking order at The New Lawn. He made his Nuneaton Town debut on 9 August 2014 on the opening day of the Conference National season, playing the full 90 minutes in a 3–0 home defeat against Eastleigh. On 18 February 2015, it was announced that he had come to a mutual agreement to leave Forest Green after a 2 1/2-year stay with the club.

In February 2016 Vieira took the role of player / coach at Wellington team Kapiti Coast United.

== Honours ==
Carlisle United

- Conference National play-offs: 2004–05

Fleetwood Town

- Conference National: 2011–12
