= 2017–18 FA Vase =

Football Association Vase

Tournament details
- Country: England; Wales

Final positions
- Champions: Thatcham Town (1st title)
- Runners-up: Stockton Town

The 2017–18 FA Vase was the 44th season of the FA Vase, an annual football competition for teams playing below Step 4 of the English National League System. The competition was played with two qualifying rounds preceding the six proper rounds, semi-finals (played over two legs) and final played at Wembley Stadium. All first-leg ties until the semi-finals were played with extra time if drawn after regulation – first-leg ties could also be resolved with penalties if both teams agreed and notified the referee at least 45 minutes before kick-off.

== Calendar ==
The calendar for the 2017–18 FA Vase, as announced by The Football Association.

Round	Main Date	Number of Fixtures	Clubs	New Entries This Round	Losing Club	Winning Club
First round qualifying	9 September 2017	220	619 → 399	440	£175	£550
Second round qualifying	23 September 2017	170	399 → 229	120	£250	£725
First round proper	21 October 2017	101	229 → 128	32	£275	£825
Second round proper	11 November 2017	64	128 → 64	27	£300	£900
Third round proper	2 December 2017	32	64 → 32	none	£375	£1,125
Fourth round proper	6 January 2018	16	32 → 16	none	£625	£1,875
Fifth round proper	3 February 2018	8	16 → 8	none	£750	£2,250
Quarter-finals	24 February 2018	4	8 → 4	none	£1,375	£4,125
Semi-finals	17 and 24 March 2018	2	4 → 2	none	£1,750	£5,500
Final	20 May 2018	1	2 → 1	none	£20,000	£30,000

== First round qualifying ==
Tie	Home team (tier)	Score	Away team (tier)	Att.
Friday 8 September 2017
5	Whickham (10)	3–1	Newton Aycliffe (9)	225
24	Northwich Victoria (9)	3–4	Stockport Town (10)	115
56	Nuneaton Griff (10)	5–8 (a.e.t.)	Rocester (9)	88
58	Paget Rangers (10)	3–0	Wolverhampton Casuals (10)	141
96	Pinchbeck United (10)	1–5	Holbeach United (9)	262
113	Tower Hamlets (9)	2–1	Hackney Wick (9)	102
130	Royal Wootton Bassett Town (9)	3–1	Fairford Town (9)	159
Saturday 9 September 2017
1	Stokesley Sports Club (11)	0–8	Hebburn Town (10)	37
2	Chester-le-Street Town (10)	2–3	Silsden (10)	101
3	Ryhope Colliery Welfare (9)	7–1	Guisborough Town (9)	53
4	Seaham Red Star (9)	2–0	Albion Sports (9)	103
6	Padiham (9)	P–P	Thackley (9)	-
7	Garforth Town (9)	3–1	Holker Old Boys (10)	68
8	Blyth AFC (10)	2–1	West Allotment Celtic (10)	87
9	Esh Winning (10)	0–2	Penrith (9)	52
10	Heaton Stannington (10)	1–3	Carlisle City (10)	120
11	Tow Law Town (10)	3–2	Crook Town (10)	129
12	Brandon United (10)	2–3	Bishop Auckland (9)	133
13	Ashington (9)	3–0	Easington Colliery (10)	224
14	Northallerton Town (10)	4–2	Alnwick Town (10)	94
15	Marske United (9)	2–0	Ryton & Crawcrook Albion (10)	150
16	Barnoldswick Town (9)	0–1	Dunston UTS (9)	215
17	Darlington Railway Athletic (10)	4–6	Harrogate Railway Athletic (9)	56
18	Eccleshill United (10)	0–2	Jarrow Roofing BCA (9)	48
19	Campion (10)	1–2	Bedlington Terriers (10)	44
20	Widnes (9)	1–2	Glasshoughton Welfare (10)	41
21	Alsager Town (10)	3–2	New Mills (10)	70
22	Vauxhall Motors (11)	4–5 (a.e.t.)	1874 Northwich (9)	129
23	Maltby Main (9)	4–2	Cammell Laird 1907 (10)	78
26	St Helens Town (10)	1–2	Hemsworth Miners Welfare (9)	77
27	Selby Town (10)	1–7	Charnock Richard (9)	112
28	Rossington Main (10)	4–1	Cheadle Town (10)	68
29	Barnton (9)	P–P	Penistone Church (9)	-
30	Maine Road (9)	1–5	Pontefract Collieries (9)	88
31	Prestwich Heys (10)	P–P	Liversedge (9)	-
32	Atherton Laburnum Rovers (10)	P–P	Irlam (9)	-
33	Litherland REMYCA (10)	1–0 (a.e.t.)	Ashton Town (11)	72
34	Parkgate (9)	4–0	Daisy Hill (10)	67
37	A.F.C. Blackpool (10)	1–6	West Didsbury & Chorlton (9)	64
38	Squires Gate (9)	2–6	Congleton Town (9)	63
39	Cadbury Athletic (10)	2–3	Littleton (10)	33
40	Pegasus Juniors (10)	1–3 (a.e.t.)	Droitwich Spa (11)	51
41	Lutterworth Athletic (10)	2–4	AFC Wulfrunians (9)	54
42	Boldmere St. Michaels (9)	6–1	Coventry Alvis (10)	85
44	Bewdley Town (10)	1–4	Rugby Town (9)	87
45	Heather St. John's (10)	5–4	Coventry Sphinx (9)	47
46	Barnt Green Spartak (11)	0–1	Walsall Wood (10)	54
47	Westfields (9)	4–2	Stapenhill (10)	112
48	Wellington Amateurs (10)	0–0	Dudley Town (10)	27
49	Hereford Lads Club (10)	2–5	Stone Old Alleynians (10)	41
50	Studley (10)	3–0	Long Buckby (10)	41
51	Leicester Road (10)	1–4	Racing Club Warwick (10)	48
52	Malvern Town (10)	1–4	Smethwick Rangers (10)	95
53	Chelmsley Town (10)	4–1	A.F.C. Bridgnorth (10)	41
54	Uttoxeter Town (10)	4–1	Gornal Athletic (11)	71
55	Ellesmere Rangers (10)	0–7	Highgate United (9)	47
57	Ashby Ivanhoe (10)	3–1	St Martins (11)	90
59	Hanley Town (9)	5–1	Lichfield City (10)	71
60	Ellistown (11)	3–2	Eccleshall (10)	25
61	Wolverhampton Sporting (10)	5–0	F.C. Oswestry Town (10)	50
62	Shawbury United (9)	2–4	Wellington F.C. (10)	59
63	Whitchurch Alport (10)	4–4 (4–3 p)	Pershore Town (10)	180
Match awarded to Pershore Town as Whitchurch Alport removed from competition due to rules violation.
64	Cradley Town (10)	7–1	Bromyard Town (11)	36
65	Bilston Town (10)	3–2	Bolehall Swifts (10)	75
66	Coton Green (11)	2–5	Heath Hayes (10)	48
67	Tividale (10)	0–2	Brocton (10)	68
68	Long Eaton United (9)	2–0	Rainworth Miners Welfare (9)	84
69	Hall Road Rangers (9)	2–0	Gedling Miners Welfare (10)	65
70	Quorn (9)	2–1	Oadby Town (9)	90
71	Clifton All Whites (10)	2–2	Harrowby United (10)	32
72	Friar Lane & Epworth (11)	0–3	Lutterworth Town (10)	40
73	Kimberley Miners Welfare (10)	1–2	Barrow Town (10)	38
Match awarded to Kimberley Miners Welfare as Barrow Town fielded an ineligible player.
74	South Normanton (11)	2–3	Melton Town (10)	30
75	Radcliffe Olympic (10)	0–6	Belper United (10)	17
76	Kirby Muxloe (9)	3–2	Anstey Nomads (10)	75
77	Ilkeston	W.O.	Clipstone (9)	-
Walkover for Clipstone as Ilkeston were removed from the tournament as the club folded.
78	Leicester Nirvana (9)	5–1	Graham Street Prims (10)	27
79	Loughborough University (9)	5–0	Winterton Rangers (10)	70
80	Worksop Town (9)	5–2	Aylestone Park (10)	321
82	Hucknall Town (11)	2–1	Clay Cross Town (11)	101
83	Heanor Town (9)	0–2	Holbrook Sports (10)	177
84	Collingham (11)	W.O.	Radford (10)	-
Walkover for Radford as Collingham were removed from the tournament.
85	Bottesford Town (9)	5–1	West Bridgford (10)	47
86	Birstall United (10)	1–6	South Normanton Athletic (9)	68
87	Skegness Town (11)	3–0	Sleaford Town (9)	150
88	Westella & Willerby (11)	1–1 (5–3 p)	Arnold Town (10)	30
Match played at Arnold Town.
89	Blaby & Whetstone Athletic (10)	6–0	Blidworth Welfare (11)	20
90	Raunds Town (10)	2–0	Wellingborough Town (9)	55
91	Stewarts & Lloyds Corby (10)	1–6	Swaffham Town (10)	35
92	Fakenham Town (9)	2–3	Huntingdon Town (10)	46
93	Downham Town (10)	0–2	Biggleswade United (9)	59
94	Histon (9)	5–1	Blackstones (10)	152
95	Potton United (10)	1–1	Netherton United (11)	32
97	Bourne Town (10)	3–2 (a.e.t.)	Harborough Town (9)	57
98	March Town United (10)	2–3	Peterborough Northern Star (9)	74
99	Cogenhoe United (9)	1–1	Rothwell Corinthians (9)	73
100	Stansted (9)	0–3	Wodson Park (10)	32
101	Basildon United (9)	1–1	St Margaretsbury (9)	95
103	Framlingham Town (10)	2–0	Waltham Forest (9)	71
104	Brimsdown (10)	1–2	Debenham LC (10)	35
105	Clacton (9)	0–2 (a.e.t.)	Coggeshall Town (9)	102
106	Hadleigh United (9)	2–1	Wadham Lodge (9)	67
107	Ilford (9)	2–0	Cornard United (10)	34
108	Redbridge (9)	6–1	Brantham Athletic (9)	72
110	Norwich CBS (10)	2–0	Ipswich Wanderers (9)	41
111	Saffron Walden Town (9)	1–2	Sawbridgeworth Town (9)	295
112	Enfield Borough (10)	4–2	Canning Town (11)	40
114	Woodbridge Town (10)	2–0	Hoddesdon Town (9)	106
116	Long Melford (9)	1–2 (a.e.t.)	Halstead Town (10)	88
117	Great Yarmouth Town (9)	3–1	Broxbourne Borough (10)	88
118	Haverhill Rovers (9)	1–3	Whitton United (10)	74
119	Wivenhoe Town (9)	0–2	Holland (10)	105
120	Great Wakering Rovers (9)	6–1	Sporting Bengal United (9)	78
121	Wootton Blue Cross (11)	2–3 (a.e.t.)	London Lions (10)	68
122	Welwyn Garden City (9)	3–1	Brackley Town Saints (9)	110
123	A.F.C. Hayes (9)	2–2	Hatfield Town (10)	27
124	Hillingdon Borough (10)	2–1	Marston Shelton Rovers (11)	60
125	Malmesbury Victoria (10)	5–3 (a.e.t.)	Chipping Sodbury Town (9)	126
126	New College Swindon (10)	0–10	Ampthill Town (10)	30

Tie	Home team (tier)	Score	Away team (tier)	Att.
128	North Greenford United (9)	3–4	Harpenden Town (9)	32
131	Clanfield (10)	2–1	Holmer Green (9)	29
132	Colney Heath (9)	1–0	Harefield United (10)	47
133	Abingdon United (9)	1–0	Highmoor Ibis (9)	46
134	Hadley (9)	2–0	Milton United (10)	36
135	Edgware Town (9)	2–1	Risborough Rangers (10)	55
136	Cricklewood Wanderers (11)	7–2	Stotfold (9)	50
137	Crawley Green (9)	2–1	Tuffley Rovers (9)	29
138	Highworth Town (9)	4–0	Easington Sports (10)	77
139	Leighton Town (9)	3–1	Brimscombe & Thrupp (9)	96
140	Ardley United (10)	2–4	Longlevens (9)	32
141	Lydney Town (9)	4–2	Winslow United (10)	67
142	Buckingham Athletic (10)	1–1	Bedford (10)	38
143	Broadfields United (10)	3–1	Pitshanger Dynamo (11)	22
144	Amersham Town (11)	1–3	Langford (10)	34
145	Rochester United (9)	3–5	Lancing (9)	60
146	Southwick (10)	2–7	Broadbridge Heath (9)	27
147	Hollands & Blair (9)	W.O.	Tooting & Mitcham Wanderers (11)	-
Tie awarded to Hollands & Blair as Tooting & Mitcham Wanderers were removed from the tournament.
149	Eastbourne United (9)	1–2 (a.e.t.)	Newhaven (9)	114
150	Ringmer (10)	1–3	AC London (10)	31
152	Glebe (9)	3–3	Deal Town (9)	71
153	East Preston (9)	4–4	Forest Hill Park (10)	68
154	Sheppey United (9)	5–1	Loxwood (9)	276
155	Oakwood (10)	2–4	Langney Wanderers (10)	30
156	FC Elmstead (10)	1–5	Whitstable Town (9)	61
157	Hailsham Town (10)	2–3	Abbey Rangers (9)	62
158	Banstead Athletic (9)	1–2	Fisher (10)	45
159	Westside (11)	0–2	Steyning Town (10)	46
160	Snodland Town (10)	0–3	Horsham YMCA (9)	129
161	Chessington & Hook United (10)	2–1	Lydd Town (10)	55
162	Worthing United (9)	2–4	Horley Town (9)	54
163	Colliers Wood United (9)	0–2	K Sports (10)	25
164	Bridon Ropes (10)	2–0	Wick (10)	29
166	Walton & Hersham (9)	7–1	Little Common (10)	65
167	Spelthorne Sports (9)	W.O.	Sutton Athletic (10)	-
Walkover for Spelthorne Sports as Sutton Athletic were removed from the tournament.
168	CB Hounslow United (9)	2–1	Peacehaven & Telscombe (9)	73
169	St Francis Rangers (10)	1–1	Erith Town (9)	30
170	Seaford Town (10)	1–3	Saltdean United (9)	23
171	Mile Oak (10)	2–1	Chertsey Town (9)	37
172	Arundel (9)	0–4	Lordswood (9)	52
173	Canterbury City (9)	4–3	Sutton Common Rovers (9)	59
175	Gravesham Borough (10)	1–3	Cobham (10)	29
176	Tooting Bec (11)	3–1	Littlehampton Town (9)	52
177	AFC Uckfield Town (9)	2–0	Raynes Park Vale (10)	31
178	Redhill (9)	1–3	Chatham Town (9)	83
179	Beckenham Town (9)	3–2 (a.e.t.)	Lingfield (10)	103
180	Bedfont Sports (9)	1–2	Three Bridges (9)	33
181	Tadley Calleva (10)	3–2	Andover New Street (10)	68
182	Shaftesbury (9)	4–5 (a.e.t.)	Brockenhurst (9)	69
183	Horndean (9)	4–3 (a.e.t.)	Andover Town (9)	64
184	Windsor (9)	2–1	Devizes Town (10)	110
185	Hamble Club (9)	3–1	Bemerton Heath Harlequins (9)	42
187	Hamworthy United (9)	5–2	AFC Stoneham (10)	65
188	Amesbury Town (9)	3–0	New Milton Town (10)	33
189	East Cowes Victoria Athletic (10)	1–3	Calne Town (10)	73
190	A.F.C. Aldermaston (10)	2–3	Romsey Town (10)	53
191	Petersfield Town (9)	1–0	Corsham Town (10)	81
192	Swanage Town & Herston (11)	4–3 (a.e.t.)	Ash United (10)	40
193	Cove (10)	0–3	Westbury United (10)	28
194	Warminster Town (10)	3–1	Folland Sports (10)	84
195	Knaphill (9)	1–0	Sidlesham (11)	79
196	Pewsey Vale (10)	0–2	Chippenham Park (10)	55
197	Newport (IoW) (9)	5–2	Fleet Spurs (10)	71
198	Guildford City (9)	1–2	Lymington Town (9)	80
199	United Services Portsmouth (10)	2–1 (a.e.t.)	Verwood Town (10)	25
200	Ringwood Town (10)	1–0	Eversley & California (10)	45
201	Laverstock & Ford (10)	1–2	Fawley (10)	43
202	Cowes Sports (9)	1–3	Baffins Milton Rovers (9)	97
203	Hythe & Dibden (10)	4–3	Bagshot (10)	45
204	Camelford (10)	3–2	Helston Athletic (10)	42
205	Cullompton Rangers (10)	1–0	Torpoint Athletic (10)	76
206	Wellington AFC (9)	3–1	Wells City (9)	64
207	Cheddar (10)	1–3	Radstock Town (10)	66
208	Bovey Tracey (11)	3–1	Keynsham Town (10)	91
209	Witheridge (10)	1–9	Cribbs (9)	36
210	Plymouth Parkway (10)	4–1	Sherborne Town (10)	152
211	Axminster Town (11)	2–4	Crediton United (11)	113
212	Tavistock (10)	2–0	Hallen (9)	65
213	Almondsbury (10)	1–2	Clevedon Town (9)	50
214	Bitton (9)	1–3	Brislington (9)	61
215	Welton Rovers (10)	0–1	Willand Rovers (9)	67
216	Bridport (9)	1–2	Wincanton Town (10)	125
217	St Austell (10)	9–1	Bishops Lydeard (10)	136
218	Cadbury Heath (9)	3–1	St Blazey (11)	80
219	Roman Glass St George (10)	2–0 (a.e.t.)	Elburton Villa (11)	42
220	Ashton & Backwell United (10)	2–1	Godolphin Atlantic (10)	45
Sunday 10 September 2017
25	Hallam (10)	1–1	Abbey Hey (9)	180
35	Worsbrough Bridge Athletic (10)	2–3	Dronfield Town (10)	77
36	A.F.C. Liverpool (9)	3–2	Athersley Recreation (9)	118
43	Coventry United (9)	3–1	Tipton Town (11)	282
81	Grimsby Borough (10)	0–3	Shirebrook Town (10)	80
102	Barkingside (9)	2–1	Southend Manor (9)	80
109	Enfield 1893 (9)	1–0	Haverhill Borough (9)	72
115	Stowmarket Town (9)	7–0	Team Bury (10)	120
127	Baldock Town (10)	1–0	Buckingham Town (10)	79
129	Oxford City Nomads (9)	3–1	Woodley United (9)	19
148	AFC Croydon Athletic (9)	2–1	Bearsted (9)	68
151	Erith & Belvedere (10)	4–2 (a.e.t.)	Holmesdale (10)	43
165	FC Deportivo Galicia (10)	6–3 (a.e.t.)	Lewisham Borough (10)	55
174	Stansfeld (10)	4–0	Bedfont & Feltham (10)	90
186	Ascot United (9)	1–3	Farnham Town (9)	105
Tuesday 12 September 2017
6	Padiham (9)	5–0	Thackley (9)	112
Thackley advanced after Padiham removed from tournament for rules violation.
29	Barnton (9)	3–1	Penistone Church (9)	65
31	Prestwich Heys (10)	1–2	Liversedge (9)	47
32	Atherton Laburnum Rovers (10)	1–2	Irlam (9)	68
Replays
Tuesday 12 September 2017
25R	Abbey Hey (9)	0–1	Hallam (10)	63
71R	Harrowby United (10)	4–0	Clifton All Whites (10)	34
99R	Rothwell Corinthians (9)	1–2	Cogenhoe United (9)	61
101R	St Margaretsbury (9)	1–2	Basildon United (9)	60
123R	Hatfield Town (10)	0–3	A.F.C. Hayes (9)	23
142R	Bedford (10)	1–6	Buckingham Athletic (10)	25
152R	Deal Town (9)	7–2	Glebe (9)	79
Wednesday 13 September 2017
48R	Dudley Town (10)	3–1 (a.e.t.)	Wellington Amateurs (10)	53
95R	Netherton United (11)	0–3	Potton United (10)	80
153R	Forest Hill Park (10)	1–0	East Preston (9)	30
169R	Erith Town (9)	2–0	St Francis Rangers (10)	39

== Second round qualifying ==
Tie	Home team (tier)	Score	Away team (tier)	Att.
Friday 22 September 2017
11	Whickham (10)	3–2	Blyth AFC (10)	150
116	AC London (10)	0–5	Horley Town (9)	32
Saturday 23 September 2017
1	Ryhope Colliery Welfare (9)	2–0 (a.e.t.)	Northallerton Town (10)	120
2	Team Northumbria (9)	2–0	Durham City (10)	85
3	Stockton Town (9)	4–3 (a.e.t.)	Consett (9)	212
4	Garforth Town (9)	3–2	Nelson (10)	72
5	Hebburn Town (10)	1–3	Newcastle Benfield (9)	219
6	Billingham Synthonia (9)	2–2	Whitley Bay (9)	125
7	Willington (10)	0–1	Harrogate Railway Athletic (9)	80
8	Tow Law Town (10)	5–1	Penrith (9)	138
9	Carlisle City (10)	2–3	Thornaby (10)	66
10	Marske United (9)	2–0 (a.e.t.)	Seaham Red Star (9)	170
12	West Auckland Town (9)	3–0	Silsden (10)	179
13	Thackley (9)	2–3 (a.e.t.)	Ashington (9)	96
14	Dunston UTS (9)	5–0	Washington (9)	235
15	Jarrow Roofing BCA (9)	1–2	Knaresborough Town (10)	53
16	Bedlington Terriers (10)	2–0	Bishop Auckland (9)	71
17	Rossington Main (10)	2–2	Hallam (10)	110
18	Litherland REMYCA (10)	3–2	Chadderton (10)	39
19	Irlam (9)	2–1	Parkgate (9)	68
20	Winsford United (9)	1–4	Pontefract Collieries (9)	103
21	Alsager Town (10)	5–1	Nostell Miners Welfare (10)	58
23	A.F.C. Liverpool (9)	0–2	City of Liverpool (9)	492
24	Sandbach United (10)	0–2	AFC Emley (10)	123
25	Ashton Athletic (9)	3–1	Maltby Main (9)	64
26	Charnock Richard (9)	3–0	Bacup Borough (10)	118
27	Burscough (9)	6–0	Armthorpe Welfare (10)	56
28	West Didsbury & Chorlton (9)	4–3	Stockport Town (10)	183
29	Glasshoughton Welfare (10)	2–4	A.F.C. Darwen (9)	65
30	Dronfield Town (10)	4–2 (a.e.t.)	Barnton (9)	90
31	Hemsworth Miners Welfare (9)	2–3 (a.e.t.)	Liversedge (9)	82
33	Bilston Town (10)	1–4	Haughmond (9)	74
34	Dudley Town (10)	0–4	Atherstone Town (10)	75
35	Wellington F.C. (10)	2–1	Littleton (10)	63
36	Chelmsley Town (10)	2–4	AFC Wulfrunians (9)	45
37	Dudley Sports (10)	0–6	Brocton (10)	21
38	Shifnal Town (10)	3–2 (a.e.t.)	Droitwich Spa (11)	63
39	Cradley Town (10)	0–2	Walsall Wood (10)	67
40	Ellistown (11)	0–5	Wednesfield (10)	33
41	Heather St. John's (10)	3–0	Rocester (9)	51
42	Westfields (9)	6–0	Daventry Town (9)	137
43	Stourport Swifts (9)	5–1	Paget Rangers (10)	79
44	Smethwick Rangers (10)	1–4	Rugby Town (9)	50
45	Stafford Town (10)	4–1	Ashby Ivanhoe (10)	48
46	Studley (10)	0–2	Hanley Town (9)	46
47	Boldmere St. Michaels (9)	3–4 (a.e.t.)	Worcester City (9)	185
48	Racing Club Warwick (10)	7–1	Coventry Copsewood (10)	90
49	Heath Hayes (10)	0–3	Wolverhampton Sporting (10)	97
52	Barton Town Old Boys (9)	1–2	Clipstone (9)	84
53	Retford United (10)	1–2	Pinxton (11)	130
55	Leicester Nirvana (9)	4–2	Belper United (10)	35
56	Lutterworth Town (10)	7–0	Teversal (10)	75
57	Shirebrook Town (10)	3–1	Long Eaton United (9)	153
58	Hall Road Rangers (9)	4–1	Skegness Town (11)	92
59	Hucknall Town (11)	1–4	Eastwood Community (11)	214
60	Holwell Sports (10)	0–1	Dunkirk (10)	45
61	Melton Town (10)	1–4	Bolsover (10)	68
62	Holbrook Sports (10)	1–2	Quorn (9)	53
63	Blaby & Whetstone Athletic (10)	4–0	Bottesford Town (9)	36
64	Loughborough University (9)	2–4	Staveley Miners Welfare (9)	95
65	Worksop Town (9)	3–0	Kirby Muxloe (9)	339
66	Boston Town (9)	1–2	South Normanton Athletic (9)	58
67	Sandiacre Town (11)	1–3	Sherwood Colliery (11)	50
68	Harrowby United (10)	4–1	St Andrews (9)	40
69	Radford (10)	1–4	Kimberley Miners Welfare (10)	55
70	Godmanchester Rovers (9)	1–0	Raunds Town (10)	94
71	Northampton ON Chenecks (9)	2–1	Irchester United (10)	71
72	Swaffham Town (10)	4–5 (a.e.t.)	Rushden & Higham United (10)	58
73	Biggleswade (9)	5–3	Northampton Sileby Rangers (9)	68
74	Histon (9)	0–1	Cogenhoe United (9)	150
75	Potton United (10)	1–2	Peterborough Northern Star (9)	56
76	Bourne Town (10)	0–5	Wisbech Town (9)	151
77	Eynesbury Rovers (9)	2–1	Burton Park Wanderers (10)	81
78	Biggleswade United (9)	2–0	Thrapston Town (10)	66
79	Holbeach United (9)	2–1	Huntingdon Town (10)	78
80	Thetford Town (9)	W.O.	Oakham United (10)	-
Oakham United withdrew from the tournament as they were unable to raise side.
81	Wellingborough Whitworth (9)	1–3	Wisbech St Mary (10)	70
82	Redbridge (9)	2–2	Coggeshall Town (9)	50
83	Tower Hamlets (9)	10–1	Little Oakley (10)	56
84	Enfield Borough (10)	6–2	Woodbridge Town (10)	48
85	Wroxham (9)	0–3	Norwich CBS (10)	151
86	Basildon United (9)	2–1 (a.e.t.)	Walsham-le-Willows (9)	108
88	Halstead Town (10)	2–1	Stanway Rovers (9)	128
89	West Essex (9)	1–2	Great Wakering Rovers (9)	44
90	Diss Town (10)	2–3 (a.e.t.)	Framlingham Town (10)	98
91	Ilford (9)	0–3	Hullbridge Sports (9)	40
92	Kirkley & Pakefield (9)	2–3	Burnham Ramblers (9)	66
93	Great Yarmouth Town (9)	1–1	Debenham LC (10)	92
94	Wodson Park (10)	2–2	Holland (10)	37
95	Stowmarket Town (9)	4–5 (a.e.t.)	Enfield 1893 (9)	132
96	Hadleigh United (9)	1–2 (a.e.t.)	Sawbridgeworth Town (9)	84
97	Buckingham Athletic (10)	1–0	A.F.C. Hayes (9)	72
98	Ampthill Town (10)	4–0	Clanfield (10)	65
99	Highworth Town (9)	5–1	Burnham (9)	81
100	Abingdon United (9)	0–2	Welwyn Garden City (9)	79

Tie	Home team (tier)	Score	Away team (tier)	Att.
101	Broadfields United (10)	7–0	Holyport (10)	22
102	Wantage Town (9)	2–0	Lydney Town (9)	68
103	Cricklewood Wanderers (11)	7–2	Rayners Lane (10)	50
104	Hadley (9)	5–5	Colney Heath (9)	54
105	Hillingdon Borough (10)	0–3	Harpenden Town (9)	20
106	Wallingford Town (10)	1–2 (a.e.t.)	Oxhey Jets (9)	43
107	Tytherington Rocks (10)	1–8	Longlevens (9)	23
108	Oxford City Nomads (9)	1–5	Baldock Town (10)	30
109	Royal Wootton Bassett Town (9)	5–0	Codicote (10)	62
110	London Lions (10)	A–A	Malmesbury Victoria (10)	120
Match abandoned due to serious injury to a Malmesbury Victoria player.
111	Langford (10)	3–1	Crawley Green (9)	51
Tie awarded to Crawley Green as Langford were removed from the tournament.
112	Edgware Town (9)	4–0	Henley Town (10)	49
113	Leighton Town (9)	2–0	Leverstock Green (9)	116
114	Whitstable Town (9)	6–5 (a.e.t.)	Lancing (9)	129
115	Cobham (10)	2–0	Bexhill United (10)	67
117	Rusthall (9)	2–1	Crawley Down Gatwick (9)	119
118	Hassocks (9)	0–3	Spelthorne Sports (9)	82
119	Saltdean United (9)	3–1	Stansfeld (10)	62
120	Balham (9)	5–0	Forest Hill Park (10)	16
121	Horsham YMCA (9)	3–1	Langney Wanderers (10)	66
122	Broadbridge Heath (9)	3–2 (a.e.t.)	AFC Croydon Athletic (9)	68
123	Billingshurst (10)	1–2	Lordswood (9)	83
124	Steyning Town (10)	0–3	Three Bridges (9)	110
125	Sporting Club Thamesmead (10)	0–8	Walton & Hersham (9)	40
126	Meridian VP (10)	0–0 (3–1 p)	FC Deportivo Galicia (10)	19
127	Beckenham Town (9)	1–0	Bridon Ropes (10)	75
128	Erith & Belvedere (10)	4–2 (a.e.t.)	Chessington & Hook United (10)	27
129	K Sports (10)	4–2	Abbey Rangers (9)	56
130	Chatham Town (9)	2–4 (a.e.t.)	Kensington Borough (10)	170
131	Tooting Bec (11)	0–3	Fisher (10)	99
132	Newhaven (9)	1–2	Hollands & Blair (9)	84
133	Deal Town (9)	2–1	CB Hounslow United (9)	83
135	Sheppey United (9)	2–2	Tunbridge Wells (9)	331
137	Newport (IoW) (9)	2–1	Alresford Town (9)	100
138	Badshot Lea (10)	2–3	Frimley Green (10)	56
139	Romsey Town (10)	2–0	Bournemouth (9)	70
140	AFC Portchester (9)	3–0	Tadley Calleva (10)	113
141	Knaphill (9)	0–2	Horndean (9)	105
142	Fareham Town (9)	4–2	Binfield (9)	81
143	Godalming Town (9)	3–5	Brockenhurst (9)	100
144	Alton (10)	7–3	Amesbury Town (9)	63
145	Baffins Milton Rovers (9)	1–0	Selsey (10)	95
146	Hamworthy United (9)	2–6	Lymington Town (9)	92
147	Calne Town (10)	0–1	Downton (10)	75
148	Sandhurst Town (10)	2–1	Ringwood Town (10)	45
149	Warminster Town (10)	0–4	Farnham Town (9)	81
150	Midhurst & Easebourne (10)	0–2	United Services Portsmouth (10)	59
151	Swanage Town & Herston (11)	3–2	Fawley (10)	50
152	Windsor (9)	8–0	Whitchurch United (10)	96
153	Westbury United (10)	5–2 (a.e.t.)	Christchurch (10)	75
Match ordered to be replayed at Christchurch after Westbury United used a fourth substitute in extra time.
154	Bashley (9)	4–0	Hythe & Dibden (10)	134
156	Hamble Club (9)	5–0	Petersfield Town (9)	42
157	Willand Rovers (9)	4–1	Saltash United (10)	95
158	Odd Down (9)	3–1	Oldland Abbotonians (10)	33
159	Radstock Town (10)	2–0	Roman Glass St George (10)	41
160	Hengrove Athletic (9)	3–1	Ashton & Backwell United (10)	55
161	Cadbury Heath (9)	3–1	Shepton Mallet (9)	69
162	Clevedon Town (9)	0–1	Wellington AFC (9)	73
163	Bovey Tracey (11)	1–0	Bishop Sutton (10)	53
164	St Austell (10)	4–5 (a.e.t.)	Bridgwater Town (9)	267
165	Wincanton Town (10)	0–3	Plymouth Parkway (10)	93
166	Tavistock (10)	P–P	Camelford (10)	-
167	Cullompton Rangers (10)	2–1	Cribbs (9)	62
168	Portishead Town (10)	1–6	Bodmin Town (10)	76
169	Longwell Green Sports (9)	2–3 (a.e.t.)	Ivybridge Town (10)	58
170	Crediton United (11)	0–0 (6–5 p)	Brislington (9)	57
Sunday 24 September 2017
22	1874 Northwich (9)	1–1	Congleton Town (9)	313
50	Uttoxeter Town (10)	0–1	Bardon Hill (11)	135
51	Coventry United (9)	2–1	Stone Old Alleynians (10)	170
54	Westella & Willerby (11)	4–0	Ollerton Town (10)	39
87	Barkingside (9)	2–3	Whitton United (10)	90
134	Erith Town (9)	1–0	Mile Oak (10)	78
136	Canterbury City (9)	3–0	AFC Uckfield Town (9)	72
155	Chippenham Park (10)	0–2	Camberley Town (9)	25
Wednesday 27 September 2017
166	Tavistock (10)	3–2	Camelford (10)	53
Sunday 1 October 2017
110	London Lions (10)	3–1	Malmesbury Victoria (10)	117
Tuesday 3 October 2017
32	Highgate United (9)	6–2	Pershore Town (10)	54
Wednesday 11 October 2017
153	Christchurch (10)	1–0	Westbury United (10)	89
Replays
Tuesday 26 September 2017
6R	Whitley Bay (9)	3–0	Billingham Synthonia (9)	233
17R	Hallam (10)	0–2	Rossington Main (10)	105
22R	Congleton Town (9)	0–1	1874 Northwich (9)	218
82R	Coggeshall Town (9)	3–1	Redbridge (9)	110
93R	Debenham LC (10)	2–0 (a.e.t.)	Great Yarmouth Town (9)	70
104R	Colney Heath (9)	3–0	Hadley (9)	59
135R	Tunbridge Wells (9)	1–5	Sheppey United (9)	223
Thursday 28 September 2017
94R	Holland (10)	4–1	Wodson Park (10)	79

== First round proper ==
Tie	Home team (tier)	Score	Away team (tier)	Att.
Friday 20 October 2017
43	Holland (10)	1–2	Great Wakering Rovers (9)	100
57	Crawley Green (9)	3–0	Harpenden Town (9)	49
Saturday 21 October 2017
1	Ashton Athletic (9)	A–A	Liversedge (9)	60
Match abandoned in the 70th minutes due to inclement weather when the score was 3–0.
2	West Didsbury & Chorlton (9)	0–3	West Auckland Town (9)	145
3	Irlam (9)	1–4	1874 Northwich (9)	174
4	Garforth Town (9)	2–3 (a.e.t.)	Knaresborough Town (10)	165
5	Team Northumbria (9)	1–1 (a.e.t.)	Runcorn Linnets (9)	88
6	AFC Emley (10)	2–6	Thornaby (10)	140
7	Rossington Main (10)	3–4 (a.e.t.)	Bootle (9)	146
8	Ryhope Colliery Welfare (9)	10–1	Harrogate Railway Athletic (9)	48
9	Pickering Town (9)	3–4 (a.e.t.)	Newcastle Benfield (9)	182
10	Dunston UTS (9)	2–1	Burscough (9)	182
11	Ashington (9)	1–2	Hall Road Rangers (9)	228
12	Tow Law Town (10)	2–1	Bridlington Town (9)	182
13	Bedlington Terriers (10)	1–0	Charnock Richard (9)	78
14	Whickham (10)	0–2	Stockton Town (9)	84
15	North Shields (9)	4–2	Handsworth Parramore (9)	228
16	A.F.C. Darwen (9)	P–P	Marske United (9)	-
17	Alsager Town (10)	5–2	Runcorn Town (9)	73
18	Westella & Willerby (11)	1–5	Whitley Bay (9)	122
19	Pontefract Collieries (9)	3–1	Litherland REMYCA (10)	99
20	City of Liverpool (9)	7–0	Dronfield Town (10)	372
21	Blaby & Whetstone Athletic (10)	3–1	Northampton ON Chenecks (9)	44
22	Walsall Wood (10)	1–0	Atherstone Town (10)	133
23	Lutterworth Town (10)	2–3	Coventry United (9)	154
24	Westfields (9)	6–0	Shifnal Town (10)	96
25	Brocton (10)	4–1	Wednesfield (10)	65
26	Stourport Swifts (9)	3–2	Shirebrook Town (10)	108
27	Worcester City (9)	4–3	Sherwood Colliery (11)	408
28	Wolverhampton Sporting (10)	P–P	Staveley Miners Welfare (9)	-
29	Rugby Town (9)	2–0 (a.e.t.)	Harrowby United (10)	160
30	Pinxton (11)	3–1	Heather St. John's (10)	112
31	Hanley Town (9)	1–3	Godmanchester Rovers (9)	82
32	Racing Club Warwick (10)	2–0	Clipstone (9)	81
33	Haughmond (9)	1–2	Worksop Town (9)	155
34	Wellington F.C. (10)	0–2	Desborough Town (9)	45
35	Eastwood Community (11)	3–2	Dunkirk (10)	110
36	Bardon Hill (11)	3–4	Quorn (9)	54
37	Stafford Town (10)	0–1	Kimberley Miners Welfare (10)	58
38	AFC Wulfrunians (9)	1–1 (a.e.t.)	Leicester Nirvana (9)	66
39	Rushden & Higham United (10)	0–2	Highgate United (9)	86
40	Bolsover (10)	1–3	Deeping Rangers (9)	67
41	Holbeach United (9)	1–0	South Normanton Athletic (9)	101
42	Hullbridge Sports (9)	1–1 (a.e.t.)	Colney Heath (9)	45
44	Burnham Ramblers (9)	0–1	Leighton Town (9)	55
45	London Colney (9)	4–4 (a.e.t.)	Cogenhoe United (9)	60
46	Basildon United (9)	0–2	Biggleswade (9)	95
48	Enfield Borough (10)	4–2 (a.e.t.)	Newmarket Town (9)	47
49	Framlingham Town (10)	2–0	Cockfosters (9)	128
50	Wisbech St Mary (10)	2–1	Whitton United (10)	60
51	Norwich CBS (10)	1–0	Oxhey Jets (9)	67
52	Thetford Town (9)	1–1 (a.e.t.)	Debenham LC (10)	82
53	Welwyn Garden City (9)	3–0	Takeley (9)	191
54	Halstead Town (10)	2–2 (5–6 p)	Tower Hamlets (9)	39
55	Peterborough Northern Star (9)	1–0	Baldock Town (10)	74
56	Biggleswade United (9)	0–1	Yaxley (9)	83
58	Wisbech Town (9)	4–0	Felixstowe & Walton United (9)	279
60	Edgware Town (9)	1–3	Walton & Hersham (9)	61
61	Haywards Heath Town (9)	2–0	Camberley Town (9)	93
62	Cobham (10)	0–4	Westfield (9)	50

Tie	Home team (tier)	Score	Away team (tier)	Att.
63	Bracknell Town (9)	6–2	Buckingham Athletic (10)	232
64	Erith & Belvedere (10)	2–2 (a.e.t.)	Horley Town (9)	54
65	Balham (9)	1–3	Deal Town (9)	70
66	Thatcham Town (9)	2–1	Horsham YMCA (9)	96
67	London Lions (10)	3–2	Clapton (9)	190
68	Sevenoaks Town (9)	2–1	Longlevens (9)	66
69	Broadbridge Heath (9)	3–0	Kensington Borough (10)	61
70	Beckenham Town (9)	2–0	Sawbridgeworth Town (9)	73
71	Saltdean United (9)	0–1	Whitstable Town (9)	35
72	Cray Valley Paper Mills (9)	3–1	Cricklewood Wanderers (11)	40
Match awarded to Cricklewood Wanderers as Cray Valley Paper Mills fielded an ineligible player.
73	Rusthall (9)	2–7	Epsom & Ewell (9)	96
74	Canterbury City (9)	4–3	K Sports (10)	42
75	Royal Wootton Bassett Town (9)	2–1	Ampthill Town (10)	62
76	Spelthorne Sports (9)	0–1	Lordswood (9)	48
77	Sheppey United (9)	2–1	Fisher (10)	288
78	Erith Town (9)	4–0	Pagham (9)	41
79	Wembley (9)	3–0	Broadfields United (10)	44
80	Hanworth Villa (9)	3–2	Three Bridges (9)	72
81	Flackwell Heath (9)	2–5	Windsor (9)	102
82	Meridian VP (10)	2–0	Hollands & Blair (9)	30
83	Bodmin Town (10)	P–P	Swanage Town & Herston (11)	-
84	Odd Down (9)	1–2	Tavistock (10)	36
85	AFC Portchester (9)	2–3	Cullompton Rangers (10)	173
86	Wellington AFC (9)	4–3	Downton (10)	40
87	Highworth Town (9)	1–3	Sholing (9)	122
88	Christchurch (10)	3–0	United Services Portsmouth (10)	56
89	Romsey Town (10)	2–3	Hamble Club (9)	78
90	Portland United (9)	P–P	Horndean (9)	-
91	Fareham Town (9)	4–3	Ivybridge Town (10)	111
92	Wantage Town (9)	4–3	Cadbury Heath (9)	53
93	Baffins Milton Rovers (9)	1–0	Radstock Town (10)	105
94	Hengrove Athletic (9)	4–2 (a.e.t.)	Alton (10)	34
95	Newport IoW (9)	5–0	Bovey Tracey (11)	110
96	Plymouth Parkway (10)	6–1	Sandhurst Town (10)	221
97	Brockenhurst (9)	2–1 (a.e.t.)	Crediton United (11)	97
98	Willand Rovers (9)	7–1	Street (9)	94
99	Farnham Town (9)	2–0	Lymington Town (9)	83
100	Frimley Green (10)	0–2	Blackfield & Langley (9)	104
101	Bashley (9)	2–3 (a.e.t.)	Bridgwater Town (9)	118
Sunday 22 October 2017
47	Enfield 1893 (9)	1–0 (a.e.t.)	Coggeshall Town (9)	113
59	FC Romania (9)	2–0	Eynesbury Rovers (9)	58
Tuesday 24 October 2017
16	A.F.C. Darwen (9)	P–P	Marske United (9)	135
90	Portland United (9)	0–1	Horndean (9)	91
Wednesday 25 October 2017
16	A.F.C. Darwen (9)	2–3	Marske United (9)	135
28	Wolverhampton Sporting (10)	4–2	Staveley Miners Welfare (9)	68
Thursday 26 October 2017
1	Ashton Athletic (9)	4–2	Liversedge (9)	75
Saturday 28 October 2017
83	Bodmin Town (10)	2–1	Swanage Town & Herston (11)	108
Replays
Tuesday 24 October 2017
5R	Runcorn Linnets (9)	3–2	Team Northumbria (9)	261
38R	Leicester Nirvana (9)	4–1	AFC Wulfrunians (9)	57
42R	Colney Heath (9)	0–1	Hullbridge Sports (9)	79
45R	Cogenhoe United (9)	1–0	London Colney (9)	49
52R	Debenham LC (10)	0–2	Thetford Town (9)	91
64R	Horley Town (9)	3–2 (a.e.t.)	Erith & Belvedere (10)	127

== Second round proper ==
Tie	Home team (tier)	Score	Away team (tier)	Att.
Friday 10 November 2017
30	Yaxley (9)	3–0	Peterborough Northern Star (9)	186
40	Walton & Hersham (9)	2–1	Hanworth Villa (9)	142
Saturday 11 November 2017
1	Stockton Town (9)	4–2 (a.e.t.)	Bootle (9)	360
2	North Shields (9)	2–1	Knaresborough Town (10)	372
3	Dunston UTS (9)	0–1	Worksop Town (9)	368
4	Marske United (9)	2–1 (a.e.t.)	Shildon (9)	431
5	Ryhope Colliery Welfare (9)	1–2	City of Liverpool (9)	245
6	1874 Northwich (9)	P–P	Tow Law Town (10)	-
7	Hall Road Rangers (9)	2–4 (a.e.t.)	Pontefract Collieries (9)	96
8	West Auckland Town (9)	3–2	Billingham Town (10)	135
9	Runcorn Linnets (9)	1–1	Sunderland RCA (9)	387
10	Ashton Athletic (9)	1–0	Morpeth Town (9)	185
11	Bedlington Terriers (10)	0–3	Newcastle Benfield (9)	135
12	Thornaby (10)	2–4 (a.e.t.)	Whitley Bay (9)	230
13	Wolverhampton Sporting (10)	2–2	Rugby Town (9)	107
14	Hinckley (10)	2–0	AFC Mansfield (9)	172
15	Coleshill Town (9)	8–1	Blaby & Whetstone Athletic (10)	125
16	Godmanchester Rovers (9)	3–4	Deeping Rangers (9)	147
17	Brocton (10)	3–5	Shepshed Dynamo (9)	102
18	Desborough Town (9)	7–4 (a.e.t.)	Pinxton (11)	127
19	Quorn (9)	0–6	Coventry United (9)	123
20	Racing Club Warwick (10)	2–1	Alsager Town (10)	186
21	Leicester Nirvana (9)	0–2	Eastwood Community (11)	134
22	Walsall Wood (10)	5–0	Holbeach United (9)	171
23	Worcester City (9)	1–2	Highgate United (9)	391
24	Kimberley Miners Welfare (10)	0–2	Stourport Swifts (9)	109
25	Sporting Khalsa (9)	0–1	Bromsgrove Sporting (9)	311
26	Tring Athletic (9)	4–1	Ely City (9)	137
27	Welwyn Garden City (9)	2–1	Newport Pagnell Town (9)	241
28	Thetford Town (9)	1–4	Wisbech Town (9)	286
29	Biggleswade (9)	2–0	Crawley Green (9)	133
31	Leighton Town (9)	1–0	London Lions (10)	140
32	Hullbridge Sports (9)	3–2	Wembley (9)	60
33	Sun Sports (9)	W.O.	Cogenhoe United (9)	-
Sun Sports was exempted to the second-round proper but resigned from first-team football after the season started.
34	Tower Hamlets (9)	1–2	Enfield 1893 (9)	77
35	Enfield Borough (10)	2–4 (a.e.t.)	Berkhamsted (9)	85
36	Gorleston (9)	2–1	Framlingham Town (10)	127
37	Wisbech St Mary (10)	1–4	Norwich CBS (10)	130

Tie	Home team (tier)	Score	Away team (tier)	Att.
38	Great Wakering Rovers (9)	2–2	FC Romania (9)	115
41	Haywards Heath Town (9)	P–P	Sevenoaks Town (9)	-
42	Whitstable Town (9)	3–2 (a.e.t.)	Epsom & Ewell (9)	186
43	Meridian VP (10)	0–3	Horley Town (9)	41
44	Sheppey United (9)	2–3	Beckenham Town (9)	318
45	Westfield (9)	1–0	Canterbury City (9)	75
46	Thatcham Town (9)	8–2	Broadbridge Heath (9)	120
48	Crowborough Athletic (9)	5–0	Croydon (9)	205
49	Bracknell Town (9)	8–0	Cricklewood Wanderers (11)	282
50	Corinthian (9)	3–4	Eastbourne Town (9)	74
51	Chichester City (9)	P–P	Deal Town (9)	-
52	Christchurch (10)	3–2	Fareham Town (9)	126
53	Team Solent (9)	P–P	Tavistock (10)	-
54	Exmouth Town (10)	1–3	Blackfield & Langley (9)	110
55	Sholing (9)	2–1	Wellington AFC (9)	128
56	Wantage Town (9)	1–4	Melksham Town (9)	108
57	Newport IoW (9)	6–2	Hengrove Athletic (9)	120
58	Baffins Milton Rovers (9)	3–1	Cullompton Rangers (10)	185
59	Buckland Athletic (9)	1–2	Bradford Town (9)	151
60	Hamble Club (9)	5–4 (a.e.t.)	Brockenhurst (9)	101
61	Willand Rovers (9)	1–2	Westfields (9)	157
62	Farnham Town (9)	2–3	Bridgwater Town (9)	90
63	Plymouth Parkway (10)	4–2	Bodmin Town (10)	435
64	Horndean (9)	P–P	Royal Wootton Bassett Town (9)	-
Sunday 12 November 2017
39	Erith Town (9)	1–2	Windsor (9)	97
47	Southall (10)	1–2	Lordswood (9)	80
Tuesday 14 November 2017
6	1874 Northwich (9)	5–1	Tow Law Town (10)	229
41	Haywards Heath Town (9)	1–2	Sevenoaks Town (9)	78
51	Chichester City (9)	3–0	Deal Town (9)	68
53	Team Solent (9)	2–0	Tavistock (10)	60
64	Horndean (9)	3–2	Royal Wootton Bassett Town (9)	52
Replays
Tuesday 14 November 2017
9R	Sunderland RCA (9)	1–2	Runcorn Linnets (9)	245
13R	Rugby Town (9)	0–2	Wolverhampton Sporting (10)	109
Wednesday 15 November 2017
38R	FC Romania (9)	0–1	Great Wakering Rovers (9)	68

== Third round proper ==
Tie	Home team (tier)	Score	Away team (tier)	Att.
Saturday 2 December 2017
1	1874 Northwich (9)	2–0	Ashton Athletic (9)	248
2	Stockton Town (9)	1–0	City of Liverpool (9)	527
3	West Auckland Town (9)	4–3	Whitley Bay (9)	275
4	Pontefract Collieries (9)	3–0	Worksop Town (9)	270
5	Newcastle Benfield (9)	3–1	North Shields (9)	298
6	Runcorn Linnets (9)	2–3	Marske United (9)	369
7	Stourport Swifts (9)	3–1	Walsall Wood (10)	141
8	Bromsgrove Sporting (9)	1–1	Coventry United (9)	834
9	Wolverhampton Sporting (10)	5–0	Shepshed Dynamo (9)	98
10	Desborough Town (9)	4–1 (a.e.t.)	Eastwood Community (11)	194
11	Highgate United (9)	1–2	Coleshill Town (9)	117
12	Hinckley (10)	3–1	Deeping Rangers (9)	193
13	Racing Club Warwick (10)	0–2	Wisbech Town (9)	229
14	Gorleston (9)	2–4	Leighton Town (9)	124
15	Hullbridge Sports (9)	3–2	Enfield 1893 (9)	85
16	Yaxley (9)	2–3	Norwich CBS (10)	107
17	Great Wakering Rovers (9)	0–2	Cogenhoe United (9)	98
18	Tring Athletic (9)	1–0	Berkhamsted (9)	285
19	Welwyn Garden City (9)	1–2 (a.e.t.)	Biggleswade (9)	232

Tie	Home team (tier)	Score	Away team (tier)	Att.
20	Lordswood (9)	0–1	Bracknell Town (9)	80
21	Beckenham Town (9)	2–3 (a.e.t.)	Eastbourne Town (9)	76
22	Horley Town (9)	4–1	Baffins Milton Rovers (9)	207
23	Walton & Hersham (9)	1–2	Windsor (9)	161
24	Crowborough Athletic (9)	1–0	Westfield (9)	127
25	Whitstable Town (9)	0–2	Chichester City (9)	170
26	Thatcham Town (9)	3–1	Sevenoaks Town (9)	145
27	Christchurch (10)	0–1	Newport IoW (9)	92
28	Sholing (9)	0–1	Blackfield & Langley (9)	169
29	Plymouth Parkway (10)	2–3	Westfields (9)	253
30	Hamble Club (9)	2–1	Horndean (9)	74
31	Bridgwater Town (9)	2–2	Melksham Town (9)	247
32	Bradford Town (9)	4–0	Team Solent (9)	143
Replays
Monday 4 December 2017
31R	Melksham Town (9)	2–0	Bridgwater Town (9)	204
Wednesday 6 December 2017
8R	Coventry United (9)	3–3 (3–4 p)	Bromsgrove Sporting (9)	205

== Fourth round proper ==
Tie	Home team (tier)	Score	Away team (tier)	Att.
Saturday 6 January 2018
1	Newcastle Benfield (9)	1–1	Coleshill Town (9)	203
2	Wisbech Town (9)	1–3	Bromsgrove Sporting (9)	650
3	Cogenhoe United (9)	2–3	Wolverhampton Sporting (10)	155
4	Marske United (9)	P–P	Hinckley (10)	-
6	Stockton Town (9)	2–1 (a.e.t.)	West Auckland Town (9)	537
7	Desborough Town (9)	2–4 (a.e.t.)	Stourport Swifts (9)	292
8	Melksham Town (9)	2–1	Crowborough Athletic (9)	686
9	Westfields (9)	1–4	Hamble Club (9)	242
10	Blackfield & Langley (9)	3–3	Bracknell Town (9)	145
11	Leighton Town (9)	5–2 (a.e.t.)	Norwich CBS (10)	260
12	Newport IoW (9)	P–P	Bradford Town (9)	-
13	Eastbourne Town (9)	1–3	Windsor (9)	596
14	Horley Town (9)	1–2	Chichester City (9)	317

Tie	Home team (tier)	Score	Away team (tier)	Att.
15	Tring Athletic (9)	5–1	Hullbridge Sports (9)	217
16	Thatcham Town (9)	2–1	Biggleswade (9)	216
Sunday 7 January 2018
5	1874 Northwich (9)	3–1	Pontefract Collieries (9)	625
Saturday 13 January 2018
4	Marske United (9)	5–0	Hinckley (10)	252
12	Newport IoW (9)	0–1	Bradford Town (9)	249
Replays
Tuesday 9 January 2018
10R	Bracknell Town (9)	2–1	Blackfield & Langley (9)	396
Saturday 13 January 2018
1R	Coleshill Town (9)	1–1 (4–2 p)	Newcastle Benfield (9)	224

== Fifth round proper ==
Tie	Home team (tier)	Score	Away team (tier)	Att.
Saturday 3 February 2018
1	Wolverhampton Sporting (10)	P–P	Leighton Town (9)	-
2	Thatcham Town (9)	2–1	Bromsgrove Sporting (9)	701
3	Marske United (9)	2–0	Bradford Town (9)	383
4	Coleshill Town (9)	2–4 (a.e.t.)	Bracknell Town (9)	285
5	1874 Northwich (9)	1–0	Chichester City (9)	580

Tie	Home team (tier)	Score	Away team (tier)	Att.
6	Stockton Town (9)	3–0	Stourport Swifts (9)	663
7	Windsor (9)	2–0	Hamble Club (9)	625
8	Melksham Town (9)	2–1	Tring Athletic (9)	1,236
Saturday 10 February 2018
1	Wolverhampton Sporting (10)	3–4	Leighton Town (9)	188

== Quarter-finals ==
Tie	Home team (tier)	Score	Away team (tier)	Att.
Saturday 24 February 2018
1	Bracknell Town (9)	0–3	Marske United (9)	1,142
2	Melksham Town (9)	0–1	Thatcham Town (9)	2,208

Tie	Home team (tier)	Score	Away team (tier)	Att.
3	Stockton Town (9)	2–0	Windsor (9)	1,213
4	Leighton Town (9)	0–1	1874 Northwich (9)	800

== Semi-finals ==
Semi final fixtures are due to be played on 17 March and 24 March 2018, with the second leg going to extra time and penalties if required.

=== First leg ===
17 March 2018
15:00

Marske United (9)	0–2	Stockton Town (9)
	Report	Rowbotham 12' (o.g.); Woodhouse 44'

Bishopton Road West, Stockton-On-Tees
Attendance: 1,502
Referee: Matt Donohue

Match played at Bishopton Road West, Stockton due to Marske United's ground being waterlogged.

17 March 2018
15:00

Thatcham Town (9)	1–0	1874 Northwich (9)
Cook 4' (pen.)	Report

Waterside Park, Thatcham
Attendance: 1,134
Referee: Carl Brook

=== Second leg ===
24 March 2018
15:00

Stockton Town (9)	1–2	Marske United (9)
N Mulligan 41' (pen.)	Report	O’Sullivan 8'; Fairley 56'

Bishopton Road West, Stockton-On-Tees
Attendance: 1,800
Referee: Thomas Bramall

Stockton Town won 3–2 on aggregate

24 March 2018
15:00

1874 Northwich (9)	2–3	Thatcham Town (9)
McGowan 44' (pen.); Woolley 69'	Report	James 3', 22'; Cooper-Clark 47'

Wincham Park, Northwich
Attendance: 1,693
Referee: Neil Hair

Thatcham Town won 4–2 on aggregate

== Final ==
20 May 2018
12:15

Stockton Town (9)	0–1	Thatcham Town (9)
	Report	Cooper-Clark 24' (pen.)

Wembley Stadium, London
