= 2016–17 FA Vase =

Football Association Vase

Tournament details
- Country: England; Wales

Final positions
- Champions: South Shields (1st title)
- Runners-up: Cleethorpes Town

The 2016–17 FA Vase is the 43rd season of the FA Vase, an annual football competition for teams playing below Step 4 of the English National League System. The competition is to be played with two qualifying rounds preceding the six proper rounds, semi-finals (played over two legs) and final to be played at Wembley Stadium. All first-leg ties until the semi-finals are played with extra time if drawn after regulation – first-leg ties may also be resolved with penalties if both teams agree and notify the referee at least 45 minutes before kick-off (rule 11a).

== Calendar ==
The calendar for the 2016–17 FA Vase, as announced by The Football Association.

Round	Main Date	Number of Fixtures	Clubs	New Entries This Round	Prize Money
First round qualifying	10 September 2016	194	592 → 398	388	£600
Second round qualifying	24 September 2016	169	398 → 229	144	£800
First round proper	22 October 2016	101	229 → 128	33	£900
Second round proper	12 November 2016	64	128 → 64	27	£1,000
Third round proper	3 December 2016	32	64 → 32	none	£1,300
Fourth round proper	7 January 2017	16	32 → 16	none	£2,000
Fifth round proper	28 January 2017	8	16 → 8	none	£2,500
Sixth round proper	18 February 2017	4	8 → 4	none	£4,500
Semi-finals	11 March and 18 March 2017	2	4 → 2	none	£6,000
Final	21 May 2017	1	2 → 1	none	Runner-up £17,000 Winner £25,000

== First round qualifying ==
Tie	Home team (tier)	Score	Away team (tier)	Att.
1	Bridlington Town (9)	6–0	Yorkshire Amateur (10)	129
2	Bedlington Terriers (10)	0–3	Bishop Auckland (9)	55
3	Albion Sports (9)	3–4	Ashington (9)	92
4	Knaresborough Town (10)	1–2	Silsden (10)	147
5	Stockton Town (10)	2–0	Eccleshill United (10)	150
6	Blyth Town (10)	1–2	Ryton & Crawcrook Albion (10)	128
7	Darlington Railway Athletic (10)	0–4	Barnoldswick Town (9)	39
8	Consett (9)	5–1	Hebburn Town (10)	284
9	Daisy Hill (10)	4–1	Garforth Town (9)	67
10	Penrith (9)	5–3	Durham City (10)	114
11	Billingham Town (10)	4–2	Willington (10)	100
12	West Allotment Celtic (9)	0–2	Hall Road Rangers (10)	85
13	Washington (9)	0–1	Billingham Synthonia (10)	53
14	Easington Colliery (10)	2–1	Thackley (9)	72
15	AFC Darwen (9)	1–2	Pickering Town (9)	174
16	Nelson (9)	1–2	Heaton Stannington (10)	67
17	West Auckland Town (9)	3–2 (a.e.t.)	Seaham Red Star (9)	126
18	Crook Town (10)	1–2	Esh Winning (10)	100
19	Carlisle City (10)	1–2	Team Northumbria (10)	45
20	Brandon United (10)	0–7	Chester-le-Street (9)	53
21	Tow Law Town (10)	1–3	Norton & Stockton Ancients (10)	57
22	Whickham (10)	0–2	Charnock Richard (10)	242
23	Thornaby (10)	1–4	Liversedge (9)	57
24	Newcastle Benfield (9)	8–1	Alnwick Town (10)	53
25	City of Liverpool (10)	1–2	Litherland REMYCA (10)	711
26	Barton Town Old Boys (9)	0–2	Grimsby Borough (10)	85
27	Staveley Miners Welfare (9)	1–0	Cheadle Town (10)	120
28	Maltby Main (9)	0–2	Widnes (10)	42
29	Alsager Town (10)	2–1	Squires Gate (9)	44
30	Ashton Town (10)	4–2	Parkgate (9)	45
31	Bootle (9)	4–1	Maine Road (9)	103
32	St Helens Town (10)	3–5	Chadderton (10)	52
33	Runcorn Town (9)	4–1	Winsford United (9)	92
34	Dronfield Town (10)	0–2	Glasshoughton Welfare (10)	53
35	Pontefract Collieries (10)	2–4	Hemsworth Miners Welfare (9)	88
36	Irlam (9)	1–0	Selby Town (10)	75
37	Winterton Rangers (10)	1–5	Penistone Church (10)	43
38	Ashton Athletic (9)	2–0	Athersley Recreation (9)	67
39	Armthorpe Welfare (9)	2–3	Congleton Town (9)	58
40	Barnton (9)	5–2	Harworth Colliery (11)	45
41	Black Country Rangers (10)	1–0	Stafford Town (10)	71
42	Dudley Town (10)	0–4	Wellington Amateurs (10)	59
43	FC Oswestry Town (10)	1–3	Walsall Wood (9)	70
44	Coton Green (11)	1–3	Kirby Muxloe (9)	23
45	Ashby Ivanhoe (10)	3–1	Pelsall Villa (10)	93
46	Whitchurch Alport (10)	1–2	Wellington (10)	151
47	Highgate United (9)	2–0	Lye Town (9)	48
Tie played at Lye Town
48	Bolehall Swifts (10)	7–2	Heath Hayes (10)	54
49	Bromyard Town (11)	2–6	Atherstone Town (10)	52
50	Cradley Town (10)	1–4	Uttoxeter Town (10)	47
51	Pershore Town (10)	1–2	Bewdley Town (10)	58
52	Chelmsley Town (10)	3–2	Studley (10)	46
53	Ellistown & Ibstock United (10)	0–13	Bromsgrove Sporting (10)	276
Tie played at Bromsgrove Sporting
54	Redditch Borough (11)	2–5	Rocester (9)	132
55	AFC Bridgnorth (10)	0–5	Boldmere St. Michaels (9)	63
56	Shawbury United (9)	3–1	Heather St John's (10)	68
57	Shifnal Town (10)	5–1	Gornal Athletic (10)	62
58	Barnt Green Spartak (11)	0–1	Cadbury Athletic (10)	83
59	Racing Club Warwick (10)	1–3	Coventry United (9)	99
60	Malvern Town (10)	4–1	Tividale (9)	129
61	Bardon Hill (11)	1–5	Littleton (10)	30
62	Lutterworth Athletic (10)	0–2	Stone Old Alleynians (10)	42
63	Brocton (9)	6–0	Eccleshall (10)	53
64	Continental Star (11)	W.O.	Wolverhampton Casuals (10)	
Continental Star withdrew from competition
65	Stourport Swifts (9)	5–1	Smethwick Rangers (10)	58
66	Ellesmere Rangers (10)	2–7 (a.e.t.)	Pegasus Juniors (10)	47
67	Clay Cross Town (11)	2–3	Leicester Road (10)	96
68	Clifton All Whites (11)	7–0	Oadby Town (9)	26
69	Borrowash Victoria (10)	1–7	Bottesford Town (9)	46
70	Gedling Miners Welfare (10)	2–3 (a.e.t.)	Oakham United (10)	50
71	Loughborough University (9)	7–1	Arnold Town (10)	63
72	Ollerton Town (10)	2–3	Retford United (9)	155
73	Pinxton (11)	4–0	Harrowby United (9)	49
74	Rainworth Miners Welfare (9)	1–4	Heanor Town (9)	85
75	Graham Street Prims (10)	2–5	Kimberley Miners Welfare (10)	25
76	Teversal (10)	0–1 (a.e.t.)	Blidworth Welfare (11)	43
77	Aylestone Park (10)	3–7	Stapenhill (10)	50
78	Belper United (10)	0–1	Radford (10)	77
79	Barrow Town (10)	0–3	St Andrews (9)	64
80	Long Eaton United (9)	2–0	South Normanton Athletic (10)	56
81	Brigg Town (10)	0–4	Harborough Town (9)	63
82	Holbrook Sports (10)	0–2	Hinckley AFC (10)	90
83	Thetford Town (9)	4–3	Framlingham Town (10)	97
84	Yaxley (9)	7–0	Eynesbury Rovers (9)	53
85	Great Yarmouth Town (9)	3–0	Bourne Town (10)	68
86	Wisbech Town (9)	2–2	Mildenhall Town (9)	194
replay	Mildenhall Town (9)	4–0	Wisbech Town (9)	166
87	Ely City (9)	3–2 (a.e.t.)	Kirkley & Pakefield (9)	45
88	Walsham-le-Willows (9)	2–2	Deeping Rangers (9)	38
replay	Deeping Rangers (9)	3–3 (4–5 p)	Walsham-le-Willows (9)	87
89	Gorleston (9)	2–0	Wisbech St Mary (10)	96
90	Diss Town (10)	3–0	Team Bury (10)	92
91	London Bari (9)	3–0	Newbury Forest (12)	14
92	FC Clacton (9)	0–1	Enfield 1893 (9)	76
93	Wivenhoe Town (9)	1–2	Wadham Lodge (9)	72
94	Broxbourne Borough (9)	3–2	Cornard United (10)	45
95	Takeley (9)	7–2	Tower Hamlets (9)	30
96	Halstead Town (10)	3–2	Hadley (9)	86
97	Langford (10)	2–2 (4–5 p)	Baldock Town (10)	60
98	Stansted (9)	1–2	Saffron Walden Town (9)	188
99	Hadleigh United (9)	1–0	Debenham LC (10)	77
100	Burnham Ramblers (9)	2–1	London Lions (11)	26
101	Harpenden Town (10)	1–3 (a.e.t.)	Ilford (9)	42

Tie	Home team (tier)	Score	Away team (tier)	Att.
102	Whitton United (10)	0–4	Biggleswade United (9)	47
103	Woodbridge Town (10)	4–1	Hatfield Town (10)	256
104	Southend Manor (9)	7–0	West Essex (9)	30
105	Hertford Town (9)	0–0	Clapton (9)	178
Tie ordered replayed due to Clapton fielding an ineligible player
105	Hertford Town (9)	2–1	Clapton (9)	178
106	Sporting Bengal United (9)	2–1 (a.e.t.)	Stowmarket Town (10)	60
107	Codicote (10)	0–3	St Margaretsbury (9)	53
108	Redbridge (9)	5–4 (a.e.t.)	Eton Manor (9)	30
109	Raunds Town (10)	1–4	Northampton ON Chenecks (9)	40
110	Risborough Rangers (10)	0–3	Broadfields United (10)	68
111	Winslow United (10)	6–4	Rushden & Higham United (10)	44
112	Long Buckby (10)	1–3	Hillingdon Borough (10)	25
113	Bedfont & Feltham (9)	3–0	Sandhurst Town (10)	22
114	Ampthill Town (10)	2–3	Northampton Sileby Rangers (9)	58
115	Rothwell Corinthians (9)	8–0	Burton Park Wanderers (10)	48
116	AFC Hayes (9)	2–2 (2–4 p)	Crawley Green (9)	32
117	Kensington Borough (10)	0–2	Thrapston Town (10)	15
118	Brackley Town Saints (9)	3–3	Leighton Town (9)	74
replay	Leighton Town (9)	4–3	Brackley Town Saints (9)	86
119	Spelthorne Sports (9)	0–0	Tring Athletic (9)	48
replay	Tring Athletic (9)	2–0	Spelthorne Sports (9)	57
120	Cranfield United (11)	2–2	Southall (10)	30
replay	Southall (10)	W.O.	Cranfield United (11)	
Cranfield unable to raise team for replay
121	Bicester Town (10)	3–2	Potton United (10)	22
122	FC Deportivo Galicia (11)	0–1	Irchester United (10)	48
123	London Tigers (9)	3–1	Cogenhoe United (9)	16
124	Daventry Town (10)	3–1	Windsor (9)	83
125	Stotfold (9)	2–2	North Greenford United (9)	53
replay	North Greenford United (9)	4–0	Stotfold (9)	54
126	Bedford (10)	0–1	CB Hounslow United (9)	28
127	Desborough Town (9)	10–0	Woodford United (10)	47
128	Stewarts & Lloyds Corby (10)	0–4	Wellingborough Whitworth (10)	21
129	Hanworth Villa (9)	0–4	Bedfont Sports (9)	67
130	Amersham Town (11)	0–2	Highmoor Ibis (9)	60
131	AFC Stoneham (10)	3–0	Malmesbury Victoria (10)	90
132	Buckingham Athletic (10)	2–3	Binfield (9)	38
133	Hook Norton (10)	1–5 (a.e.t.)	Bracknell Town (9)	55
134	Shrivenham (10)	2–3 (a.e.t.)	Abbey Rangers (9)	32
135	Ash United (10)	2–1	Tytherington Rocks (10)	42
136	Thame United (9)	5–1	Tadley Calleva (10)	76
137	Badshot Lea (9)	3–1	Farnham Town (9)	68
138	Fairford Town (10)	3–2	Chipping Sodbury Town (9)	53
139	Chertsey Town (9)	1–2	Lydney Town (9)	48
140	AFC Portchester (9)	3–0	Holyport (10)	55
141	Woodley United (10)	0–4	Ardley United (9)	38
142	Cove (10)	0–4	Buckingham Town (10)	34
143	Tunbridge Wells (9)	4–1	Steyning Town (10)	211
144	Hailsham Town (9)	0–3	Lingfield (10)	50
145	Croydon (9)	2–1	Loxwood (9)	51
146	Whitstable Town (9)	2–2	Chichester City (9)	135
replay	Chichester City (9)	3–2	Whitstable Town (9)	83
147	Broadbridge Heath (9)	2–4	Crowborough Athletic (9)	53
148	Southwick (10)	1–2	FC Elmstead (10)	20
149	Bearsted (9)	0–1	Pagham (9)	70
150	Cray Valley PM (9)	0–1	Glebe (10)	138
151	St Francis Rangers (10)	1–2	Ringmer (10)	25
152	Raynes Park Vale (9)	1–2	Haywards Heath Town (9)	46
153	Arundel (9)	1–2	Westfield (9)	59
154	Horley Town (9)	4–2	Hassocks (9)	67
155	Sevenoaks Town (9)	3–1	Crawley Down Gatwick (9)	47
156	Little Common (10)	2–1 (a.e.t.)	Erith Town (9)	56
157	Redhill (10)	1–2	Deal Town (9)	89
Tie played at Deal Town
158	Guildford City (9)	2–1	Eastbourne United (9)	86
Guildford City removed from competition for fielding an ineligible player.
159	Chessington & Hook United (10)	3–3	Rochester United (9)	64
replay	Rochester United (9)	2–1	Chessington & Hook United (10)	68
160	Bexhill United (10)	2–3	Holmesdale (10)	46
161	Shoreham (9)	8–2	Meridian VP (10)	34
162	Mile Oak (10)	2–1	Erith & Belvedere (9)	35
163	Littlehampton Town (9)	2–0	Saltdean United (10)	57
164	Worthing United (9)	A–A (Note: Match abandoned after 70 minutes with Peacehaven & Telscombe leading 2–0, due to a spectator entering pitch.)	Peacehaven & Telscombe (9)	68
rematch	Worthing United (9)	0–2	Peacehaven & Telscombe (9)	60
165	Dorking (10)	1–4	Beckenham Town (9)	125
166	Bridon Ropes (10)	2–1	Colliers Wood United (9)	33
167	Langney Wanderers (10)	4–4	Selsey (10)	45
replay	Selsey (10)	4–1	Langney Wanderers (10)	74
168	Brockenhurst (9)	5–0	Ringwood Town (10)	64
169	Corsham Town (10)	1–0	United Services Portsmouth (10)	71
170	Westbury United (10)	2–1	Folland Sports (10)	57
171	New Milton Town (10)	1–5	Horndean (9)	42
172	Oldland Abbotonians (10)	4–0	Lymington Town (9)	54
173	Whitchurch United (9)	3–1	Laverstock & Ford (10)	19
174	Hamworthy United (9)	3–5	Amesbury Town (9)	65
175	Cowes Sports (9)	4–2 (a.e.t.)	Cadbury Heath (9)	94
176	Andover New Street (10)	1–3 (a.e.t.)	Gillingham Town (9)	40
177	Hallen (9)	3–2	Fawley (9)	43
178	Bournemouth (9)	4–3	Verwood Town (9)	37
179	Hythe & Dibden (10)	1–2	Team Solent (9)	34
180	Bemerton Heath Harlequins (9)	7–0	Downton (10)	44
181	Romsey Town (10)	3–0	Warminster Town (10)	62
182	Christchurch (10)	2–1	Swanage Town & Herston (11)	39
183	Bridport (9)	2–4	Cribbs (9)	92
184	Alresford Town (9)	5–1	Chippenham Park (10)	43
185	Welton Rovers (10)	0–3	Ashton & Backwell United (10)	44
186	Liskeard Athletic (11)	1–2	Portishead Town (10)	81
187	Hengrove Athletic (10)	3–2	Camelford (10)	50
188	AFC St Austell (10)	3–2	Crediton United (11)	169
189	Cullompton Rangers (10)	3–2	Wincanton Town (10)	105
190	Shepton Mallet (9)	1–6	Tavistock (10)	62
191	Radstock Town (10)	3–6	Torpoint Athletic (10)	50
192	Wellington (10)	0–1	Bishop Sutton (10)	29
193	Keynsham Town (10)	4–2	Ivybridge Town (10)	71
194	Cheddar (10)	2–1	Elburton Villa (11)	57

== Second round qualifying ==
Tie	Home team (tier)	Score	Away team (tier)	Att.
1	Northallerton Town (10)	0–4	Jarrow Roofing Boldon CA (9)	75
2	Whitley Bay (9)	0–2	Stockton Town (10)	322
3	West Auckland Town (9)	1–2 (a.e.t.)	Padiham (9)	89
4	Heaton Stannington (10)	0–1	Billingham Synthonia (10)	134
5	Esh Winning (10)	0–4	South Shields (9)	266
6	Easington Colliery (10)	2–0	Ashington (9)	86
7	Birtley Town (11)	2–4	Holker Old Boys (10)	55
8	Chester-le-Street Town (9)	3–2	Norton & Stockton Ancients (10)	68
9	Bishop Auckland (9)	1–2	Billingham Town (10)	310
10	Ryton & Crawcrook Albion (10)	0–5	Ryhope Colliery Welfare (9)	57
11	Barnoldswick Town (9)	7–1	Stokesley Sports Club (11)	100
12	Bridlington Town (9)	5–2	Daisy Hill (10)	138
13	Newcastle Benfield (9)	3–0	Liversedge (9)	88
14	Penrith (9)	4–2	Team Northumbria (10)	90
15	Silsden (10)	3–4 (a.e.t.)	Hall Road Rangers (10)	63
16	Consett (9)	1–3	Pickering Town (9)	317
17	Harrogate Railway Athletic (9)	1–3	Charnock Richard (10)	89
18	Westella & Willerby (10)	0–3	Irlam (9)	30
19	Atherton Laburnum Rovers (10)	3–2	Cammell Laird 1907 (9)	56
20	Alsager Town (10)	0–3	Stockport Town (10)	44
21	AFC Liverpool (9)	3–2 (a.e.t.)	Abbey Hey (9)	82
22	AFC Blackpool (10)	0–2	Runcorn Town (9)	80
23	Congleton Town (9)	7–3 (a.e.t.)	Bacup Borough (10)	100
24	Ashton Athletic (9)	1–2	AFC Emley (10)	87
25	Hallam (10)	8–1	Nostell Miners Welfare (10)	113
26	Staveley Miners Welfare (9)	2–0	Grimsby Borough (10)	137
27	Rossington Main (10)	0–4	Bootle (9)	89
28	Penistone Church (10)	3–2 (a.e.t.)	West Didsbury & Chorlton (9)	121
29	Ashton Town (10)	3–2	Barnton (9)	43
30	Litherland REMYCA (10)	3–1	Vauxhall Motors (11)	55
31	Widnes (10)	1–4	Chadderton (10)	36
32	Glasshoughton Welfare (10)	2–2	Hemsworth Miners Welfare (9)	116
replay	Hemsworth Miners Welfare (9)	1–1 (3–2 p)	Glasshoughton Welfare (10)	97
33	Hanley Town (9)	2–1	Boldmere St. Michaels (9)	51
34	Uttoxeter Town (10)	3–0	Wellington Amateurs (10)	75
35	Tipton Town (11)	0–1	Bromsgrove Sporting (10)	93
36	Birstall United (10)	2–2	Malvern Town (10)	120
replay	Malvern Town (10)	3–2 (a.e.t.)	Birstall United (10)	145
37	Rocester (9)	1–0	Black Country Rangers (10)	63
38	Willenhall Town (10)	0–3	Haughmond (10)	39
39	Walsall Wood (9)	2–0	Pegasus Juniors (10)	62
40	Stourport Swifts (9)	0–1	Cadbury Athletic (10)	93
41	Paget Rangers (11)	2–1	Highgate United (9)	39
42	Coventry Copsewood (10)	2–1	Atherstone Town (10)	78
43	Stone Old Alleynians (10)	1–1	Ashby Ivanhoe (10)	65
replay	Ashby Ivanhoe (10)	1–1 (3–1 p)	Stone Old Alleynians (10)	108
44	Coventry United (9)	2–0	Wednesfield (11)	74
45	Kirby Muxloe (9)	2–0 (a.e.t.)	Littleton (10)	37
46	Shawbury United (9)	3–2	Coventry Sphinx (9)	36
47	Wolverhampton Casuals (10)	4–2	Bilston Town (10)	77
48	Brocton (9)	0–2	Chelmsley Town (10)	67
49	Bolehall Swifts (10)	0–2	Shifnal Town (10)	54
50	Westfields (9)	8–0	Dudley Sports (10)	145
51	Wellington (10)	2–5	Lichfield City (10)	51
52	Bewdley Town (10)	1–7	Wolverhampton SC (10)	52
53	Leicester Road (10)	4–3	West Bridgford (10)	75
54	Dunkirk (10)	1–4	Bottesford Town (9)	34
55	Heanor Town (9)	2–2	Kimberley Miners Welfare (10)	195
replay	Kimberley Miners Welfare (10)	0–2	Heanor Town (9)	176
56	Anstey Nomads (10)	0–2	Quorn (9)	102
57	Oakham United (10)	1–0	Retford United (9)	90
58	Harborough Town (9)	2–1	Blaby & Whetstone Athletic (10)	111
59	Blidworth Welfare (11)	2–0	Shirebrook Town (10)	40
60	Hucknall Town (11)	5–0	Eastwood Community (11)	206
61	Pinxton (11)	4–2	Loughborough University (9)	50
62	Greenwood Meadows (10)	3–6	Hinckley AFC (10)	80
63	Clipstone (9)	1–3	Sherwood Colliery (11)	73
64	Stapenhill (10)	2–3	Long Eaton United (9)	73
65	Clifton All Whites (11)	1–2 (a.e.t.)	Holwell Sports (10)	39
66	AFC Mansfield (9)	4–2	Radcliffe Olympic (10)	49
67	New Mills (9)	3–4 (a.e.t.)	Radford (10)	106
68	St Andrews (9)	3–0	Retford (11)	62
69	Yaxley (9)	4–3 (a.e.t.)	Newmarket Town (9)	65
70	Fakenham Town (9)	1–3	Great Yarmouth Town (9)	60
71	Peterborough Northern Star (9)	4–0	Blackstones (10)	50
72	Thetford Town (9)	2–0	Downham Town (10)	96
73	Gorleston (9)	3–2	March Town United (10)	107
74	Ely City (9)	4–2	Diss Town (10)	86
75	Huntingdon Town (9)	1–4	Swaffham Town (9)	52
76	Mildenhall Town (9)	1–3	Peterborough Sports (9)	162
77	Boston Town (9)	2–3	Walsham-le-Willows (9)	51
78	Biggleswade United (9)	3–0	Woodbridge Town (10)	77
79	Colney Heath (9)	2–1	Redbridge (9)	75
80	Takeley (9)	1–2 (a.e.t.)	Biggleswade (10)	72
81	Cockfosters (9)	4–0	Hadley Wood & Wingate (10)	70
82	Waltham Forest (9)	2–1	Hadleigh United (9)	30
83	Sporting Bengal United (9)	3–2	Sawbridgeworth Town (9)	30
84	Hertford Town (9)	3–2	Brantham Athletic (9)	162
85	Haverhill Borough (10)	1–0	Haverhill Rovers (9)	654

Tie	Home team (tier)	Score	Away team (tier)	Att.
87	Long Melford (9)	2–3	Baldock Town (10)	84
88	Southend Manor (9)	0–0 (4–5 p)	Canning Town (11)	27
89	Halstead Town (10)	1–4	St Margaretsbury (9)	101
90	London Bari (9)	2–1 (a.e.t.)	Barkingside (9)	15
91	Broxbourne Borough (9)	1–2	Saffron Walden Town (9)	48
92	Burnham Ramblers (9)	0–4	Ilford (9)	27
93	Harefield United (10)	0–4	Leverstock Green (9)	50
94	Wembley (9)	2–1	Hillingdon Borough (10)	42
95	Daventry Town (10)	4–1	Edgware Town (9)	103
96	London Tigers (9)	2–5	Southall (10)	25
97	North Greenford United (9)	1–2	Oxhey Jets (9)	56
98	Bicester Town (10)	2–3	Broadfields United (10)	79
99	Holmer Green (9)	3–0	Cricklewood Wanderers (11)	47
100	Desborough Town (9)	6–3 (a.e.t.)	Wellingborough Whitworth (10)	54
101	Northampton ON Chenecks (9)	1–0	Leighton Town (9)	47
102	Bedfont & Feltham (9)	2–4	Sun Sports (9)	44
103	Northampton Sileby Rangers (9)	5–0	Rayners Lane (10)	36
104	LPOSSA (11)	W.O.	Crawley Green (9)	
LPOSSA withdrew from competition
105	Burnham (9)	2–3 (a.e.t.)	Highmoor Ibis (9)	24
106	Thrapston Town (10)	3–1	CB Hounslow United (9)	56
107	Winslow United (10)	1–4	Tring Athletic (9)	103
108	Rothwell Corinthians (9)	2–1	Irchester United (10)	43
109	Wellingborough Town (9)	0–2	Bedfont Sports (9)	142
110	Tuffley Rovers (9)	4–1	Ardley United (9)	47
111	Carterton (9)	W.O.	Brimscombe & Thrupp (9)	
Carterton withdrew from competition
112	Ash United (10)	3–1	Milton United (10)	36
113	Frimley Green (10)	0–3	Walton & Hersham (9)	51
114	Fleet Spurs (10)	1–3	Fairford Town (10)	50
115	Alton (10)	4–2	Henley Town (9)	59
116	Bashley (9)	0–4	Highworth Town (9)	127
117	Melksham Town (9)	4–0	New College Swindon (10)	65
118	Bracknell Town (9)	2–1	Binfield (9)	351
119	Royal Wootton Bassett Town (9)	2–4	Thame United (9)	62
120	Buckingham Town (10)	4–3 (a.e.t.)	Eversley & California (10)	32
121	Oxford City Nomads (9)	2–3	Abingdon United (10)	45
122	AFC Stoneham (10)	3–1	Longlevens (9)	53
123	Abbey Rangers (9)	1–0	Badshot Lea (9)	38
124	Lydney Town (9)	2–0	AFC Portchester (9)	97
125	Rochester United (9)	1–2 (a.e.t.)	Beckenham Town (9)	40
126	Glebe (10)	1–1	Deal Town (9)	48
replay	Deal Town (9)	1–3	Glebe (10)	81
127	FC Elmstead (10)	1–0	AFC Uckfield Town (9)	51
128	Ringmer (10)	2–2	Sporting Club Thamesmead (10)	47
replay	Sporting Club Thamesmead (10)	6–1	Ringmer (10)	40
129	Holmesdale (10)	1–4	Banstead Athletic (10)	30
130	Mile Oak (10)	1–3	Croydon (9)	41
131	Oakwood (10)	0–10	Shoreham (9)	43
132	Horley Town (9)	1–0	Selsey (10)	50
133	Chichester City (9)	3–1	Sheppey United (9)	58
134	AC London (10)	1–1	Littlehampton Town (9)	14
replay	Littlehampton Town (9)	1–5	AC London (10)	56
135	Little Common (10)	0–2	Wick (9)	52
136	Crowborough Athletic (9)	2–0	Gravesham Borough (10)	74
137	Corinthian (9)	3–2	Sevenoaks Town (9)	58
138	Cobham (10)	0–1	Lingfield (10)	32
139	Westfield (9)	0–1	Haywards Heath Town (9)	70
140	East Preston (10)	1–4	Tunbridge Wells (9)	125
141	Bridon Ropes (10)	2–1 (a.e.t.)	Rusthall (10)	29
142	Eastbourne United (9)	2–1	AFC Croydon Athletic (9)	104
143	Tooting & Mitcham Wanderers (11)	3–1	Seaford Town (10)	43
Tie played at Seaford Town
144	Canterbury City (9)	8–0	Peacehaven & Telscombe (9)	63
145	Pagham (9)	0–1	Horsham YMCA (9)	84
146	Westbury United (10)	1–2	Cribbs (9)	72
147	Whitchurch United (9)	0–6	Amesbury Town (9)	58
148	Devizes Town (10)	2–1	Corsham Town (10)	102
149	Portland United (9)	2–0	Almondsbury UWE (10)	141
150	Shaftesbury (10)	5–1	Fareham Town (9)	59
151	Christchurch (10)	1–3	Romsey Town (10)	48
152	Hallen (9)	1–3	Team Solent (9)	37
153	Bournemouth (9)	3–1	Brockenhurst (9)	44
154	Bitton (9)	0–3	Gillingham Town (9)	54
155	Horndean (9)	2–0	Oldland Abbotonians (10)	39
156	Calne Town (10)	4–3	Roman Glass St George (10)	44
157	Cowes Sports (9)	0–2	Alresford Town (9)	50
158	Bemerton Heath Harlequins (9)	3–0	Longwell Green Sports (9)	36
159	East Cowes Victoria Athletic (10)	0–4	Sherborne Town (9)	27
160	Cullompton Rangers (10)	4–1 (a.e.t.)	Budleigh Salterton (11)	81
161	Keynsham Town (10)	0–6	Tavistock (10)	55
162	Clevedon Town (9)	3–1 (a.e.t.)	Cheddar (10)	88
163	AFC St Austell (10)	2–3	Street (9)	185
164	Exmouth Town (10)	1–0	Witheridge (10)	89
165	Hengrove Athletic (10)	2–1	Bishop Sutton (10)	43
166	Wells City (9)	1–2	Torpoint Athletic (10)	55
167	Ashton & Backwell United (10)	0–1	Willand Rovers (9)	45
168	Portishead Town (10)	1–3 (a.e.t.)	Helston Athletic (10)	40
169	Brislington (9)	0–1	Plymouth Parkway (10)	64

== First round proper ==
Tie	Home team (tier)	Score	Away team (tier)	Att.
1	AFC Liverpool (9)	0–6	Bootle (9)	247
2	1874 Northwich (9)	1–0	Billingham Synthonia (10)	231
3	Stockport Town (10)	1–3	Ryhope Colliery Welfare (9)	45
4	Penrith (9)	3–1	Easington Colliery (10)	140
5	Guisborough Town (9)	0–3	Padiham (9)	110
6	Runcorn Town (9)	1–2	Hallam (10)	109
7	South Shields (9)	2–1	Runcorn Linnets (9)	1,060
8	Charnock Richard (10)	3–1	Barnoldswick Town (9)	178
9	Atherton Laburnum Rovers (10)	0–3	Chester-le-Street Town (9)	78
10	Ashton Town (10)	0–4	Billingham Town (10)	45
11	AFC Emley (10)	3–1	Chadderton (10)	132
12	Newcastle Benfield (9)	3–1	Irlam (9)	75
13	Atherton Collieries (9)	5–0	Jarrow Roofing Boldon CA (9)	147
14	Congleton Town (9)	2–3	Hall Road Rangers (10)	145
15	Bridlington Town (9)	0–1	Pickering Town (9)	334
16	Holker Old Boys (10)	1–2	Stockton Town (10)	110
17	Litherland REMYCA (10)	1–4	Shildon (9)	130
18	Shifnal Town (10)	1–4	Quorn (9)	55
19	Heanor Town (9)	0–4	Blidworth Welfare (11)	166
20	St Andrews (9)	1–2	Paget Rangers (11)	74
21	Long Eaton United (9)	2–1	Coventry United (9)	69
22	Wolverhampton Casuals (10)	2–1	Chelmsley Town (10)	65
23	Ashby Ivanhoe (10)	3–4	Hucknall Town (11)	121
24	Handsworth Parramore (9)	3–4	Shepshed Dynamo (9)	108
25	Bromsgrove Sporting (10)	5–3	Cadbury Athletic (10)	505
26	Westfields (9)	6–0	Walsall Wood (9)	131
27	Staveley Miners Welfare (9)	2–0	Pinxton (11)	179
28	Holwell Sports (10)	0–2	AFC Mansfield (9)	65
29	Hinckley AFC (10)	3–1	Wolverhampton SC (10)	162
30	Lichfield City (10)	2–1	Shawbury United (9)	69
31	Kirby Muxloe (9)	0–1	Hemsworth Miners Welfare (9)	47
32	Penistone Church (10)	1–2	Sherwood Colliery (11)	219
33	Bottesford Town (9)	2–0	Haughmond (10)	77
34	Malvern Town (10)	1–2	Worksop Town (9)	235
35	Rocester (9)	8–1	Oakham United (10)	107
36	Uttoxeter Town (10)	5–4	Leicester Road (10)	108
37	Radford (10)	3–1	Harborough Town (9)	85
38	Sporting Khalsa (9)	1–0	Hanley Town (9)	59
39	Coventry Copsewood (10)	0–2	Holbeach United (9)	98
40	Northampton Sileby Rangers (9)	A–A	Oxhey Jets (9)	50
Match abandoned after serious injury to Oxhey Jets goalkeeper
40	Northampton Sileby Rangers (9)	5–0	Oxhey Jets (9)	42
41	Thetford Town (9)	2–1	Great Yarmouth Town (9)	101
42	Wadham Lodge (9)	2–1	Hertford Town (9)	121
43	Sporting Bengal United (9)	0–3	Southall (10)	35
44	Felixstowe & Walton United (9)	4–0	Haverhill Borough (10)	115
45	Broadfields United (10)	2–1	London Bari (9)	11
46	Highmoor Ibis (9)	0–1	Holmer Green (9)	38
47	Peterborough Sports (9)	6–0	Swaffham Town (9)	123
48	Waltham Forest (9)	1–2	Rothwell Corinthians (9)	42
49	Thrapston Town (10)	3–7	Leverstock Green (9)	153
50	Canning Town (11)	4–5 (a.e.t.)	Biggleswade (10)	70
51	Northampton ON Chenecks (9)	1–3	Ely City (9)	35
52	Gorleston (9)	2–0	Barking (9)	118

Tie	Home team (tier)	Score	Away team (tier)	Att.
53	Biggleswade United (9)	2–1	Baldock Town (10)	123
54	Flackwell Heath (9)	0–3	Cockfosters (9)	70
55	Walsham-le-Willows (9)	0–1	Tring Athletic (9)	82
56	Crawley Green (9)	1–2	Basildon United (9)	37
57	Colney Heath (9)	1–4	Hoddesdon Town (9)	105
58	Daventry Town (10)	2–3	Newport Pagnell Town (9)	105
59	Godmanchester Rovers (9)	0–3	London Colney (9)	65
60	Yaxley (9)	0–1	Stanway Rovers (9)	111
61	St Margaretsbury (9)	3–2	Ilford (9)	73
62	Peterborough Northern Star (9)	1–3	Sun Sports (9)	39
63	Welwyn Garden City (9)	3–1	Saffron Walden Town (9)	176
64	Wembley (9)	5–2	Desborough Town (9)	55
65	Banstead Athletic (10)	1–3	Crowborough Athletic (9)	64
66	Wick (9)	0–1	Haywards Heath Town (9)	86
67	Bedfont Sports (9)	5–4	Buckingham Town (10)	50
68	Canterbury City (9)	3–1	Lydney Town (9)	51
69	FC Elmstead (10)	0–2	Sporting Club Thamesmead (10)	149
70	Abbey Rangers (9)	3–0	Tunbridge Wells (9)	138
71	Hollands & Blair (9)	0–1	Ascot United (9)	78
72	Walton & Hersham (9)	3–0	Thame United (9)	53
73	Croydon (9)	4–1	Bracknell Town (9)	63
74	Epsom & Ewell (9)	1–0	Bridon Ropes (10)	92
75	Horsham YMCA (9)	3–2	Horndean (9)	70
76	Eastbourne United (9)	2–0	Horley Town (9)	138
77	Shoreham (9)	2–3	Glebe (10)	107
78	Beckenham Town (9)	1–3	Lancing (9)	100
79	Eastbourne Town (9)	9–0	Tooting & Mitcham Wanderers (11)	142
80	AC London (10)	3–3	Highworth Town (9)	49
replay	Highworth Town (9)	A-A	AC London (10)	125
Match abandoned after serious injury to AC London player in 90th minute (0–1)
replay	Highworth Town (9)	2–1	AC London (10)	141
81	Fairford Town (10)	1–2	Andover Town (9)	101
82	Alton (10)	0–2	Corinthian (9)	85
83	Ash United (10)	0–4	Chichester City (9)	73
84	Alresford Town (9)	5–3	Lingfield (10)	68
85	Lordswood (9)	1–2	Newhaven (9)	42
86	Abingdon United (10)	1–3	Thatcham Town (9)	85
87	Cribbs (9)	1–1	Odd Down (9)	55
replay	Odd Down (9)	2–1	Cribbs (9)	39
88	Devizes Town (10)	0–3	Gillingham Town (9)	82
89	Amesbury Town (9)	0–1	Brimscombe & Thrupp (9)	53
90	Helston Athletic (10)	1–2	Team Solent (9)	141
91	Street (9)	0–2	Blackfield & Langley (9)	102
92	Bournemouth (9)	0–3	Melksham Town (9)	50
93	Calne Town (10)	0–2	Torpoint Athletic (10)	78
94	Tuffley Rovers (9)	4–0	Sherborne Town (9)	99
95	Cullompton Rangers (10)	1–0	Hengrove Athletic (10)	105
96	Bemerton Heath Harlequins (9)	2–2	Plymouth Parkway (10)	40
replay	Plymouth Parkway (10)	0–3	Bemerton Heath Harlequins (9)	64
97	Sholing (9)	0–3	Buckland Athletic (9)	147
98	Clevedon Town (9)	4–2 (a.e.t.)	Willand Rovers (9)	106
99	Romsey Town (10)	2–3	Portland United (9)	101
100	Exmouth Town (10)	3–2	Tavistock (10)	98
101	AFC Stoneham (10)	1–3	Shaftesbury (10)	60

== Second round proper ==
Tie	Home team (tier)	Score	Away team (tier)	Att.
1	Newton Aycliffe (9)	4–0	Worksop Town (9)	151
2	Pickering Town (9)	0–5	Shildon (9)	284
3	Padiham (9)	0–2	Bootle (9)	290
4	1874 Northwich (9)	0–3	Atherton Collieries (9)	283
5	Charnock Richard (10)	2–4 (a.e.t.)	Staveley Miners Welfare (9)	195
6	Billingham Town (10)	5–2	Ryhope Colliery Welfare (9)	146
7	Hallam (10)	0–4	Morpeth Town (9)	454
8	Hall Road Rangers (10)	0–2	Bottesford Town (9)	112
9	Sunderland RCA (9)	1–0 (a.e.t.)	Stockton Town (10)	125
10	North Shields (9)	2–0	Chester-le-Street Town (9)	287
11	Dunston UTS (9)	3–1	Hemsworth Miners Welfare (9)	172
12	Newcastle Benfield (9)	0–1	Penrith (9)	148
13	South Shields (9)	2–0	Marske United (9)	1,116
14	AFC Emley (10)	1–2	Cleethorpes Town (9)	215
15	Sleaford Town (9)	4–1	Leicester Nirvana (9)	72
16	Long Eaton United (9)	3–2	Holbeach United (9)	85
17	Wolverhampton Casuals (10)	1–2	Nuneaton Griff (10)	76
18	Hucknall Town (11)	5–1	Rocester (9)	174
19	Blidworth Welfare (11)	1–2	AFC Mansfield (9)	146
20	Paget Rangers (11)	1–4	Hinckley AFC (10)	311
21	Westfields (9)	3–2	Sherwood Colliery (11)	134
22	Alvechurch (9)	1–2	Sporting Khalsa (9)	130
23	Radford (10)	1–3	Shepshed Dynamo (9)	100
24	Uttoxeter Town (10)	1–3	Coleshill Town (9)	160
25	Bromsgrove Sporting (10)	3–1	Lichfield City (10)	747
26	Quorn (9)	3–1 (a.e.t.)	AFC Wulfrunians (9)	98
27	Wadham Lodge (9)	0–3	Ely City (9)	61
28	Rothwell Corinthians (9)	1–2	Tring Athletic (9)	92
29	Leverstock Green (9)	1–2	Welwyn Garden City (9)	70
30	St Margaretsbury (9)	4–2 (a.e.t.)	Stanway Rovers (9)	77
31	Newport Pagnell Town (9)	2–1	Broadfields United (10)	96
32	Berkhamsted (9)	5–2	Hullbridge Sports (9)	143
33	Gorleston (9)	2–1	Northampton Sileby Rangers (9)	140
34	Cockfosters (9)	1–2	Wembley (9)	73

Tie	Home team (tier)	Score	Away team (tier)	Att.
35	Peterborough Sports (9)	5–3	Biggleswade (10)	121
36	London Colney (9)	3–0	Holmer Green (9)	85
37	Biggleswade United (9)	1–1	Sun Sports (9)	160
replay	Sun Sports (9)	1–1 (5–4 p)	Biggleswade United (9)	50
38	FC Romania (9)	2–0	Ipswich Wanderers (9)	58
39	Hoddesdon Town (9)	2–0	Thetford Town (9)	95
40	Basildon United (9)	3–2	Felixstowe & Walton United (9)	64
41	Eastbourne Town (9)	2–1	Ashford United (9)	177
42	Sutton Common Rovers (9)	2–1	Sporting Club Thamesmead (10)	106
43	Newhaven (9)	2–1	Ascot United (9)	81
44	Bedfont Sports (9)	2–0	Haywards Heath Town (9)	48
45	Eastbourne United (9)	0–1	Crowborough Athletic (9)	121
46	Walton & Hersham (9)	2–2 (1–3 p)	Glebe (10)	75
47	Camberley Town (9)	0–4	Southall (10)	104
48	Croydon (9)	2–1	Andover Town (9)	161
49	Corinthian (9)	3–2	Alresford Town (9)	52
50	Lancing (9)	1–7	Horsham YMCA (9)	128
51	Chichester City (9)	3–1 (a.e.t.)	Canterbury City (9)	71
52	Highworth Town (9)	1–3	Knaphill (9)	145
53	Epsom & Ewell (9)	2–3	Abbey Rangers (9)	110
54	Portland United (9)	1–2	Blackfield & Langley (9)	261
55	Shaftesbury (10)	1–3	Team Solent (9)	100
56	Brimscombe & Thrupp (9)	2–2	Bradford Town (9)	103
replay	Bradford Town (9)	5–0	Brimscombe & Thrupp (9)	102
57	Bristol Manor Farm (9)	2–1	Odd Down (9)	134
58	Moneyfields (9)	0–4	Thatcham Town (9)	62
59	Cullompton Rangers (10)	1–1	Bemerton Heath Harlequins (9)	96
replay	Bemerton Heath Harlequins (9)	3–2	Cullompton Rangers (10)	86
60	Hartley Wintney (9)	1–2	Melksham Town (9)	131
61	Gillingham Town (9)	0–1	Exmouth Town (10)	88
62	Buckland Athletic (9)	1–0	Newport IW (9)	163
63	Torpoint Athletic (10)	1–0	Clevedon Town (9)	245
64	Tuffley Rovers (9)	0–2	Bodmin Town (10)	98

== Third round proper ==
Tie	Home team (tier)	Score	Away team (tier)	Att.
1	North Shields (9)	1–2	Shildon (9)	427
2	Newton Aycliffe (9)	2–3	Morpeth Town (9)	205
3	Cleethorpes Town (9)	2–1	Bootle (9)	196
4	South Shields (9)	3–0	Staveley Miners Welfare (9)	808
5	Penrith (9)	0–3	Atherton Collieries (9)	190
6	Dunston UTS (9)	1–3	Sunderland RCA (9)	186
7	Bottesford Town (9)	1–2	Billingham Town (10)	198
8	Hucknall Town (11)	1–2	AFC Mansfield (9)	245
9	Nuneaton Griff (10)	0–2	Bromsgrove Sporting (10)	168
10	Sporting Khalsa (9)	5–5	Sleaford Town (9)	70
replay	Sleaford Town (9)	0–3	Sporting Khalsa (9)	124
11	Coleshill Town (9)	4–1	Westfields (9)	87
12	Hinckley AFC (10)	2–1 (a.e.t.)	Quorn (9)	220
13	Long Eaton United (9)	2–4 (a.e.t.)	Shepshed Dynamo (9)	106
14	Wembley (9)	0–4	Peterborough Sports (9)	92
15	FC Romania (9)	1–1	Tring Athletic (9)	69
replay	Tring Athletic (9)	2–1	FC Romania (9)	140
16	Newport Pagnell Town (9)	3–1	London Colney (9)	121

Tie	Home team (tier)	Score	Away team (tier)	Att.
17	Gorleston (9)	A–A*	Basildon United (9)	177
18	St Margaretsbury (9)	1–3	Berkhamsted (9)	60
19	Sun Sports (9)	3–1	Hoddesdon Town (9)	40
20	Welwyn Garden City (9)	2–3	Ely City (9)	151
21	Abbey Rangers (9)	1–2	Eastbourne Town (9)	80
22	Crowborough Athletic (9)	2–2	Bedfont Sports (9)	174
replay	Bedfont Sports (9)	2–3	Crowborough Athletic (9)	104
23	Croydon (9)	3–2	Glebe (10)	69
24	Knaphill (9)	1–2	Southall (10)	94
25	Newhaven (9)	1–3	Chichester City (9)	66
26	Sutton Common Rovers (9)	1–4	Corinthian (9)	120
27	Horsham YMCA (9)	0–3	Buckland Athletic (9)	135
28	Bemerton Heath Harlequins (9)	2–3	Melksham Town (9)	77
29	Team Solent (9)	1–0	Bodmin Town (10)	95
30	Bradford Town (9)	2–0	Torpoint Athletic (10)	92
31	Bristol Manor Farm (9)	4–1	Thatcham Town (9)	116
32	Exmouth Town (10)	5–0	Blackfield & Langley (9)	165

- Match abandoned in 87th minute (0–1) due to spectator medical emergency, Basildon United subsequently withdrew from competition.

== Fourth round proper ==
Tie	Home team (tier)	Score	Away team (tier)	Att.
1	Shildon (9)	1–4	Atherton Collieries (9)	412
2	Billingham Town (10)	1–2	Cleethorpes Town (9)	384
3	AFC Mansfield (9)	0–1	Sunderland RCA (9)	140
4	South Shields (9)	A–A*	Morpeth Town (9)	1,545
4	Morpeth Town (9)	0–4	South Shields (9)	826
5	Gorleston (9)	0–3	Coleshill Town (9)	226
6	Sun Sports (9)	0–4	Bromsgrove Sporting (10)	314
7	Newport Pagnell Town (9)	3–2	Peterborough Sports (9)	429
8	Sporting Khalsa (9)	1–0	Tring Athletic (9)	162

Tie	Home team (tier)	Score	Away team (tier)	Att.
9	Ely City (9)	3–0	Shepshed Dynamo (9)	386
10	Hinckley AFC (10)	5–0	Berkhamsted (9)	309
11	Bradford Town (9)	2–4 (a.e.t.)	Southall (10)	152
12	Bristol Manor Farm (9)	1–1	Melksham Town (9)	245
replay	Melksham Town (9)	3–5	Bristol Manor Farm (9)	1,215
13	Chichester City (9)	1–3	Buckland Athletic (9)	260
14	Team Solent (9)	3–0	Croydon (9)	155
15	Exmouth Town (10)	4–0	Corinthian (9)	325
16	Crowborough Athletic (9)	6–0	Eastbourne Town (9)	461

- – Match abandoned after floodlight failure in the 81st minute (2–4) – rematch moved to Morpeth Town

== Fifth round proper ==
Tie	Home team (tier)	Score	Away team (tier)	Att.
1	Cleethorpes Town (9)	3–2	Atherton Collieries (9)	588
2	Southall (10)	4–2	Exmouth Town (10)	264
3	Bromsgrove Sporting (10)	2–1	Bristol Manor Farm (9)	1,487
4	Crowborough Athletic (9)	3–6	Coleshill Town (9)	605

Tie	Home team (tier)	Score	Away team (tier)	Att.
5	Hinckley AFC (10)	3–4 (a.e.t.)	Buckland Athletic (9)	418
6	Newport Pagnell Town (9)	3–2 (a.e.t.)	Sunderland RCA (9)	764
7	Ely City (9)	0–3	Sporting Khalsa (9)	646
8	Team Solent (9)	2–5	South Shields (9)	638

== Sixth round proper ==
Tie	Home team (tier)	Score	Away team (tier)	Att.
1	South Shields (9)	6–1	Newport Pagnell Town (9)	3,161
2	Southall (10)	2–5	Cleethorpes Town (9)	348

Tie	Home team (tier)	Score	Away team (tier)	Att.
3	Bromsgrove Sporting (10)	2–0	Buckland Athletic (9)	2,984
4	Coleshill Town (9)	2–0	Sporting Khalsa (9)	939

== Semi-finals ==
Semi final fixtures are due to be played on 11 March and 18 March 2016, with the second leg going to extra time and penalties if required.

=== First leg ===
11 March 2017

Bromsgrove Sporting (10)	1–1	Cleethorpes Town (9)
Cowley 61'		Edwards 70' (o.g.)

Victoria Ground, Bromsgrove
Attendance: 3,349

11 March 2017

Coleshill Town (9)	1–2	South Shields (9)
Nabat 45'		Foley 47'; Stephenson 90'

Pack Meadow, Coleshill
Attendance: 1,755

=== Second leg ===
18 March 2017

Cleethorpes Town (9)	1–0	Bromsgrove Sporting (10)
King 1'

The Bradley Football Development Centre, Grimsby
Attendance: 1,154

18 March 2017

South Shields (9)	4–0	Coleshill Town (9)
Arca 45'; Cogdon 62'; Finnigan 90'; Foley 90+1'

Mariners Park, South Shields
Attendance: 3,464

== Final ==
21 May 2017

Cleethorpes Town (9)	0–4	South Shields (9)
		Finnigan 43' (pen.); Morse 80'; Foley 86' 89'

Wembley Stadium, London
Referee: Darren England
