= 2013–14 Kent Invicta Football League =

Football league season

The 2013–14 Kent Invicta Football League season was the third in the history of the Kent Invicta Football League, a football competition in England for clubs located in and adjacent to the historic county of Kent.

The league comprised one division and there was also a league cup competition, the Challenge Trophy.

== The League ==
Kent Invicta Football League
- Season: 2013–14
- Champions: Hollands & Blair
- Matches: 210
- Goals: 869 (4.14 per match)

The league featured fifteen clubs of which thirteen had competed in the league the previous season together with two additional clubs:

- Fleet Leisure, promoted from the Kent County Football League
- Glebe, promoted from the Kent County Youth League

Also Meridian S & S changed their name to Meridian VP.

Hollands & Blair were the league champions; owing to their ground not meeting the required criteria they were denied promotion to the Southern Counties East League.

=== League table ===
Pos	Team	Pld	W	D	L	GF	GA	GD	Pts
1	Hollands & Blair	28	25	1	2	123	23	+100	76
2	Lydd Town	28	20	6	2	68	20	+48	66
3	Sutton Athletic	28	15	7	6	70	29	+41	52
4	Fleet Leisure	28	17	1	10	71	38	+33	52
5	Orpington	28	15	7	6	52	30	+22	52
6	Bearsted	28	16	3	9	75	37	+38	51
7	Rusthall	28	16	3	9	70	54	+16	51
8	Bridon Ropes	28	12	4	12	59	52	+7	40
9	Seven Acre & Sidcup	28	11	4	13	58	64	−6	37
10	Glebe	28	11	2	15	52	53	−1	35
11	Kent Football United	28	8	9	11	60	57	+3	33
12	Eltham Palace	28	6	3	19	26	66	−40	21
13	Lewisham Borough	28	5	2	21	34	102	−68	17
14	Meridian VP	28	4	4	20	31	85	−54	16
15	Crockenhill	28	1	0	27	20	159	−139	3

Source: FA Full-Time, League Official
Rules for classification: 1) points; 2) goal difference; 3) number of goals scored.

=== Results ===
Home \ Away	BEA	BRI	CRO	ELT	FLT	GLB	H&B	KFU	LEW	LYD	MER	ORP	RUS	SEV	SUT
Bearsted		2–0	10–0	1–0	2–0	2–2	2–3	2–1	8–0	0–1	3–0	1–0	3–2	1–2	0–1
Bridon Ropes	1–4		6–2	1–2	1–1	2–1	1–5	2–2	5–1	1–0	3–0	2–2	3–1	2–1	0–4
Crockenhill	0–8	1–7		3–0	2–4	1–5	0–15	0–12	0–6	0–9	1–3	3–4	0–4	0–2	0–9
Eltham Palace	0–3	0–4	3–1		1–3	0–1	0–2	1–1	0–3	0–0	0–1	1–6	1–4	2–3	0–3
Fleet Leisure	1–2	3–1	5–0	3–1		3–2	0–2	3–0	7–0	3–0	2–1	1–2	2–3	3–1	2–1
Glebe	5–4	1–2	5–0	3–0	0–1		0–5	1–3	4–0	1–3	1–0	1–3	0–1	3–2	1–3
Hollands & Blair	5–2	4–1	13–0	6–0	3–2	2–1		1–0	3–0	1–2	3–1	0–1	3–1	3–1	2–1
Kent Football United	2–1	0–2	5–0	2–3	0–2	1–1	1–12		5–0	0–2	3–3	2–0	4–1	3–3	2–2
Lewisham Borough	3–2	0–5	6–4	0–3	0–6	1–2	1–4	1–1		0–3	3–2	1–1	0–1	3–8	0–1
Lydd Town	2–1	3–2	4–0	1–1	2–1	3–0	1–1	4–0	2–0		6–0	2–1	5–1	2–2	1–1
Meridian VP	1–2	0–0	2–1	1–3	0–5	0–4	0–3	1–5	6–4	1–4		0–2	2–8	1–2	0–4
Orpington	1–1	3–2	5–0	0–1	2–1	1–0	0–5	4–1	3–0	0–1	1–1		1–1	1–1	0–0
Rusthall	2–5	3–2	2–1	2–0	4–5	3–2	1–5	2–1	8–0	0–0	3–0	1–3		4–2	1–1
Seven Acre & Sidcup	2–3	2–1	2–0	5–1	3–1	3–4	0–6	1–1	2–1	1–3	6–1	0–4	1–3		0–3
Sutton Athletic	0–0	3–0	3–0	3–2	2–1	4–1	3–5	2–2	6–0	1–2	3–3	0–1	2–3	4–0	

Source: FA Full-Time, League Official
Legend: Blue = home team win; Yellow = draw; Red = away team win.

== Challenge Trophy ==
The 2013–14 Kent Invicta League Challenge Trophy, sponsored by Pain & Glory Sports, was won by Sutton Athletic.

The competition was contested by all fifteen teams from the league over three home and away aggregate score rounds to reach the single tie final, played on a neutral ground (at Thamesmead Town this season).

=== First Round ===
Fourteen clubs competed in seven first round ties with a bye for Meridian VP

Home team	Score	Away team
Lewisham Borough	4 – 2 agg (2–0; 2–2)	Glebe
Seven Acre & Sidcup	3 – 2 agg (2–0; 1–2)	Orpington
Crockenhill	1 – 14 agg (0–7; 1–7)	Fleet Leisure
Bearsted	2 – 6 agg (1–3; 1–3)	Kent Football United
Eltham Palace	0 – 6 agg (0–1; 0–5)	Bridon Ropes
Sutton Athletic	5 – 2 agg (5–0; 0–2)	Rusthall
Lydd Town	3 – 7 agg (2–3; 1–4)	Hollands & Blair
agg = aggregate score

=== Quarter-finals, Semi-finals and Final ===
Quarter-finals
Meridian VP	4	0	4
Lewisham Borough	2	4	6
Seven Acre & Sidcup	2	1	3
Fleet Leisure	3	7	10
Kent Football United	2	0	2
Bridon Ropes	3	5	8
Sutton Athletic	0	6	6
Hollands & Blair	1	3	4

Semi-finals
Lewisham Borough	3	0	3
Fleet Leisure	4	5	9
Bridon Ropes	1	0	1
Sutton Athletic	2	4	6

Final
Fleet Leisure	0
Sutton Athletic	3

"Kent Invicta League Challenge Trophy". Kent Invicta Football League. Archived from the original on 2 June 2014.; "2013–14 Kent Invicta League: Challenge Trophy". Football Club History Database.; "Kent Invicta Football League: Pain & Glory Sports Kent Invicta League Challenge Trophy Final". Kent Invicta Football League. Archived from the original on 13 May 2014.
