= Ian Rowe =

English footballer (born 1979)

Personal information
- Date of birth: 17 June 1979 (age 47)
- Place of birth: England
- Position: Striker

Team information
- Current team: Sporting Khalsa (manager)

Senior career*
| Years | Team | Apps | (Gls) |
| 1999–2000 | Causeway United | | (30+) |
| 2000–2006 | Gornal Athletic | | |
| 2006–2008 | Dudley Town | | |

Managerial career
- 2008–2010: Dudley Town (joint)
- 2010–2013: Gornal Athletic
- 2013–2014: Tipton Town
- 2014–: Sporting Khalsa
- * Club domestic league appearances and goals

Ian Rowe (born 17 June 1979) is an English football manager and former player who played as a striker. He is the manager of Midland Football League Premier Division club Sporting Khalsa.

== Playing career ==
=== Causeway United ===
Rowe joined Causeway United ahead of the 1999–2000 season in July 1999 after they won promotion from the 1997–98 West Midlands (Regional) League Division One South, and he scored no less than thirty goals for the club as they finished as Premier Division runners-up; he scored his 30th goal for the club in April 2000.

=== Gornal Athletic ===
He then joined West Midlands (Regional) League Premier Division club Gornal Athletic in August 2000 and he scored three goals in two matches against Lye Town and Tividale during pre-season as a trialist; he made his league debut during the match against Kington Town on 19 August 2000.

He won the 2003–04 West Midlands (Regional) League Premier Division as the club's top goalscorer, and was a runner-up in the 2005–06 West Midlands (Regional) League Premier Division with Gornal Athletic.

=== Dudley Town ===
He then joined Dudley Town in 2006, finishing as a runner-up in both the West Midlands Premier League Cup and Birmingham Midweek Floodlit Cup in 2006–07.

He retired as a player in early 2008 at the age of 28 due to recurring fitness setbacks.

== Managerial career ==
Rowe became the joint-manager of Dudley Town alongside Rob Perks in 2008, leaving on 15 April 2010 to become the manager of Gornal Athletic. In his first season with Gornal Athletic, they were runners-up in both the West Midlands (Regional) League and JW Hunt Cup.

On 5 April 2013, he became the manager of Tipton Town.

He became the manager of Sporting Khalsa in July 2014 and he won the 2014–15 West Midlands (Regional) League and 2015–16 Staffordshire Senior Cup. He also won the 2020–21 Midland Football League Premier Division title to secure Step 4 football and oversaw the club as they were relegated for the first time in their history back down to the 2026–27 Midland Football League.

== Personal life ==
He has three children.

== Honours ==
=== As a player ===
Causeway United

- West Midlands (Regional) League Premier Division: runner-up 1999–2000

Gornal Athletic

- West Midlands (Regional) League Premier Division: 2005–06
- West Midlands (Regional) League Division One South: 2003–04

Dudley Town

- West Midlands Premier League Cup: runner-up 2006–07
- Birmingham Midweek Floodlit Cup: runner-up 2006–07

Individual

- Causeway United top goalscorer: 1999–2000
- Gornal Athletic top goalscorer: 2003–04

=== As a manager ===
Gornal Athletic

- West Midlands (Regional) League: runner-up 2010–11
- JW Hunt Cup: runner-up 2010–11

Sporting Khalsa

- Midland Football League Premier Division: 2020–21; third place 2015–16, 2016–17
- West Midlands (Regional) League: 2014–15
- Staffordshire Senior Cup: 2014–15
