= SNFC =

SNFC may refer to:

- South Normanton F.C.
- Sunderland Nissan F.C.
