= 2017–18 West Midlands (Regional) League =

The 2017–18 West Midlands (Regional) League season was the 118th in the history of the West Midlands (Regional) League, an English association football competition for semi-professional and amateur teams based in the West Midlands county, Shropshire, Herefordshire, Worcestershire and southern Staffordshire. The league operates three divisions: the Premier Division, see below, at level 10 in the English football league system, Division One at level 11, and Division Two. The Premier Division is one of three divisions which feed into the Midland League Premier Division, the other two being the East Midlands Counties League and the Midland League's own Division One.

The constitution for Step 5 and Step 6 divisions for 2017–18 was announced on 26 May 2017, and following one amendment, the WMRC Premier Division constitution was ratified at the league's AGM on 26 Jun.

== Premier Division ==
West Midlands League Premier Division
- Season: 2017–18
- Champions: Wolverhampton Sporting Community
- Promoted: Wolverhampton Sporting Community
- Relegated: Wellington Amateurs
- Matches: 380
- Goals: 1,645 (4.33 per match)

The Premier Division featured 17 clubs which competed in the division last season, along with three new clubs:

- Hereford Lads Club, promoted from Division One
- Tividale, relegated from the Midland Football League
- Wednesfield, promoted from Division One

=== League table ===
Pos	Team	Pld	W	D	L	GF	GA	GD	Pts	Promotion or relegation
1	Wolverhampton Sporting Community	38	34	2	2	148	29	+119	104	Promoted to the Midland League
2	Tividale	38	28	5	5	121	50	+71	89	
3	Malvern Town	38	26	5	7	113	65	+48	83	
4	Black Country Rangers	38	23	8	7	111	55	+56	77	
5	Wednesfield	38	23	5	10	101	63	+38	74	
6	Ellesmere Rangers	38	22	5	11	106	68	+38	71	Transferred to the North West Counties League
7	Bewdley Town	38	19	6	13	91	70	+21	63	
8	Cradley Town	38	19	5	14	85	63	+22	62	
9	Wolverhampton Casuals	38	18	3	17	121	95	+26	57	
10	Wellington	38	17	5	16	82	75	+7	56	
11	Bilston Town	38	16	5	17	80	85	−5	53	
12	Hereford Lads Club	38	16	3	19	73	90	−17	51	
13	Stone Old Alleynians	38	14	3	21	77	92	−15	45	Transferred to the North West Counties League
14	Smethwick Rangers	38	9	6	23	49	85	−36	33	
15	Shifnal Town	38	10	3	25	58	111	−53	33	
16	Dudley Sports	38	9	5	24	61	110	−49	32	
17	Dudley Town	38	8	7	23	43	100	−57	31	
18	AFC Bridgnorth	38	8	6	24	50	92	−42	30	
19	Pegasus Juniors	38	7	7	24	37	108	−71	28	
20	Wellington Amateurs	38	3	8	27	38	139	−101	17	Relegated to Division One

Source: FA Full-Time
Rules for classification: 1) Points; 2) Goal difference; 3) Number of goals scored; 4) Number of matches won; 5) Head-to-head results
