= Sporting Khalsa F.C. =

Association football club in England

Coordinates: 52°35′31″N 2°3′57″W

Sporting Khalsa
- Full name: Sporting Khalsa Football Club
- Nicknames: The Khalsa; Khalsa Kings
- Founded: 1991
- Ground: Guardian Warehousing Arena, Willenhall
- Capacity: 5,000
- Chairman: Raj Gill
- Manager: Ian Rowe
- League: Midland League Premier Division
- 2025–26: Northern Premier League Division One West, 19th of 22 (relegated)
Home colours

Sporting Khalsa Football Club are a football club, formed in 1991., who play their home games at the Guardian Warehousing Arena in Willenhall, West Midlands. Founded by the local Sikh community, they are the first British Asian club to own their own ground, which they bought from Banks's Brewery in 2010 after moving from Abbey Park, the former home of Bloxwich Town. The club were relegated from the eighth tier of the English football pyramid following the conclusion of the 2025–26 season.

== History ==
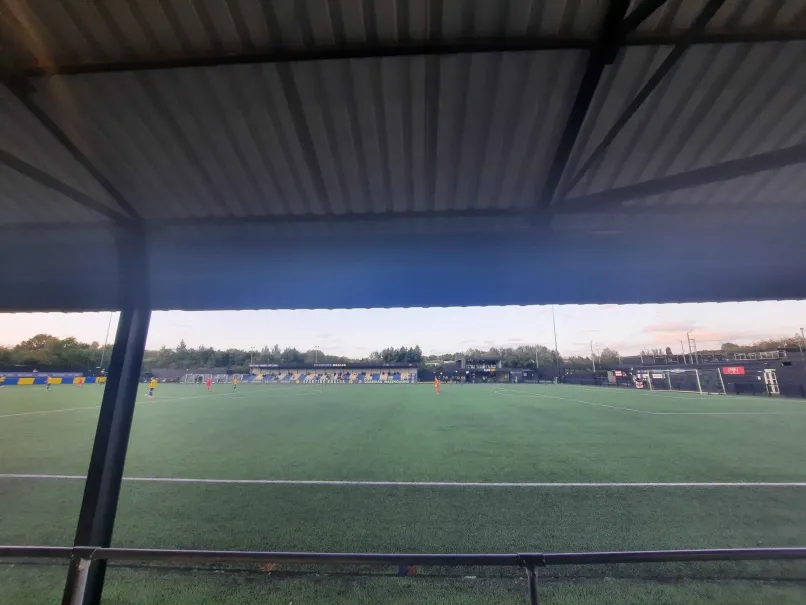
The club's home ground, Aspray Arena. Photograph taken during the 2024–25 FA Cup preliminary round vs Gresley Rovers

The team was founded in 1991 and began playing in the Walsall & District Sunday leagues. They played one season in the West Midlands (Regional) League in 1996–97 before leaving after finishing bottom of the league. They later returned in 2004–05 and were promoted after finishing 5th.

In 2011, Sporting Khalsa were promoted to the Premier Division of the West Midlands (Regional) League Premier Division. Following this success, they formed an U21s team, which plays in the Midland Combination U2ls league. In terms of their youth setup they have a couple of teams in the Midland Junior Premier League as well. Altogether they have 15 teams from U21s to u7s. The majority of their junior teams play in the Walsall minor league. The links between the first team and junior Khalsa teams are very strong with many junior team players being involved during the first team's games.

At the end of the 2012–13 season, Sporting Khalsa redeveloped their ground, changing the size of the pitch, building a new stand, creating new changing rooms and renovating the outside of the pitch and clubhouse. In addition, as part of an ongoing programme of investment at the Aspray Arena, the Black Country Performance Hub was opened, providing state-of-the-art five-a-side facilities and a gymnasium and martial arts space. Following this, in the 2013–14 season guided under the management of Mark Holdcroft, Sporting Khalsa finished in sixth position, their highest finish to date. After this, Holdcroft and Sporting Khalsa decided to part company by mutual consent.

Ian Rowe, who had guided Gornal Athletic to the Midland Alliance in the 2011–12 season, was appointed as manager. The 2014–15 season was very successful with Khalsa winning the West Midlands (Regional) League title by 27 points, finishing on a record 117 points and securing promotion to the Midland Football League Premier Division in the process.

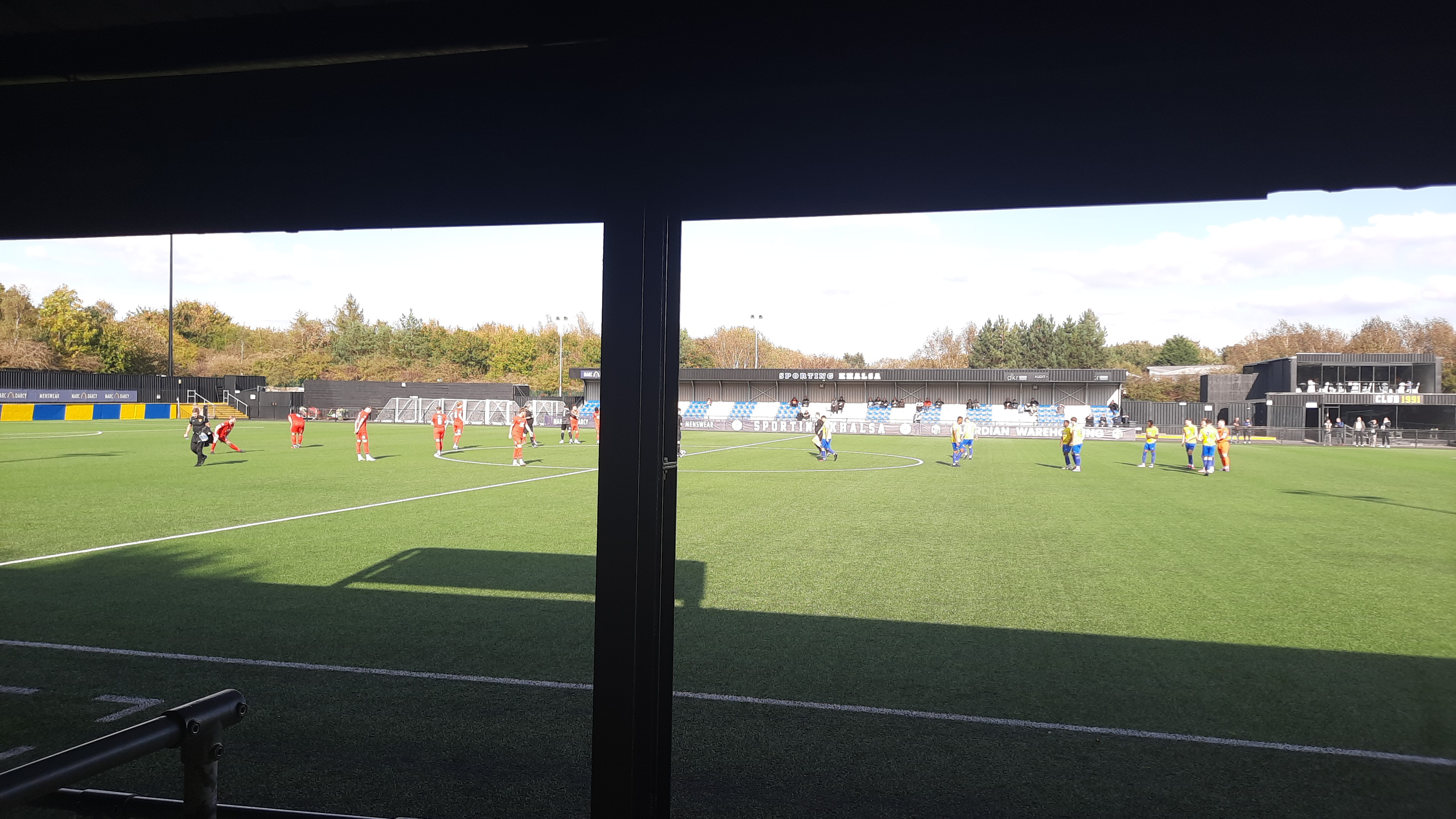
Sporting Khalsa 5–2 Harborough Town. This FA Trophy third qualifying round match played on 5 October 2024 saw Sporting Khalsa qualify for the FA Trophy tournament proper for the first time in their history

In 2015–16 they reached the fourth qualifying round of the FA Cup where they lost 3–1 at home to F.C. United of Manchester, secured third place in their first season in the Midland Football League and won the JW Hunt Cup, beating Wolverhampton Sporting C.F.C. in the final at Molineux Stadium.

Third spot was to be the prize the following season as well, this time behind champions Alvechurch and runners up Coleshill Town. However, there was good news in the FA Vase where Khalsa made it to the quarter-finals before bowing out to fellow Midland Football League side Coleshill.

The 2017–18 campaign can perhaps best be described as challenging. With a £1m redevelopment of the Aspray Arena taking place, Khalsa relocated to their neighbours AFC Wulfrunians for six months coinciding with them slipping from top of the league to their final fifth-placed finish.

In July 2018, the club officially reopened their Noose Lane ground following a £1m revamp which included the building of new spectator facilities, changing rooms and the installation of a new 5g pitch with a preseason friendly against Hereford FC.

The club qualified for the FA Trophy tournament proper for the first time in their history in 2024–25 after they won 5–2 against Harborough Town on 5 October 2024. They then progressed to the second round proper before a 5–0 loss against eventual quarter-finalists Oxford City on 16 November 2024 ended their cup run.

The club were controversially moved laterally to the Northern Premier League West Division, prior to the 2025–26 campaign, along with local rivals Darlaston Town.

Following Assistant Manager Jemiah Richards departing the club to take the managerial role at Sutton Coldfield Town - in October 2025, former Romulus manager Jason Lanns, as well as former Wolves scout Gavin Allers, joined the coaching staff.

In 2025, the club was moved to the Northern Premier League West, and were relegated for the first time in their history on the final day following a 2–1 defeat to Witton Albion, finishing in 19th place, one point from safety.

== Women's team ==
Sporting Khalsa's women's team was established in 2015 following a merger with FC Reedswood. They were promoted to the FA Women's National League Premier Division for the 2024–25 season.

The club were relegated from the third tier following the 2025-26 season.

== Current squad ==
Note: Flags indicate national team as defined under FIFA eligibility rules; some limited exceptions apply. Players may hold more than one non-FIFA nationality.

No.	Pos.	Nation	Player
—	GK	POL	Szymon Terenawicz
—	DF	ENG	Kyle Burke
—	DF	ENG	Kristian Green (captain)
—	DF	SKN	Rio Sawyers
—	DF	ENG	Che Ranger
—	DF	ENG	Mikkel Hirst
—	DF	ENG	Sam Griffiths
—	DF	ENG	Narel Phillips
—	MF	ENG	Jamie Fox
—	MF	ENG	Mitchell Glover
—	MF	ENG	Peter Taylor

No.	Pos.	Nation	Player
—	MF	ENG	Ryan Shaw
—	MF	ENG	Daniel Broni-Phillips
—	MF	PAK	Rahis Nabi
—	MF	ENG	Kieran Francis
—	MF	ENG	Kieron Whittaker
—	FW	ENG	Luke Shearer
—	FW	ENG	Freddie Cockerall
—	FW	ENG	Max Chimenes
—	FW	ENG	Dilano Reid
—	FW	ENG	Rhys Halliday
—	FW	CZE	Richard David

== Club officials ==
Football staff

- Manager: (England) Ian Rowe
- Assistant Managers: (England) Jason Lanns and (England) Gavin Allers
- Head Coach: Rhys Evans
- Head goalkeeper coach: (England) Adam Marusiak

Support staff

- Head Physio: (England) Lee Humphreys
- Physio: (England) Jack Stewart
- Kitman: (England) Nathan Richards

Club executives

- Chairman: (India) Raj Gill
- Club Secretary – (India) Manjit Gill
- First–Team Secretary - (England) Simon Haynes
- Head of Media: (England) Nathan Richards

== Records ==
- Best league performance: 5th in Northern Premier League Midlands, 2022–23
- Best FA Cup performance: Fourth qualifying round, 2015–16
- Best FA Trophy performance: Second round, 2024–25
- Best FA Vase performance: Quarter-finals, 2016–17
- Best Women's FA Cup performance: Third round, 2025–26
- Record attendance: 2,252 v F.C. United of Manchester, 24 October 2015, FA Cup Fourth qualifying round.
