= JW Hunt Cup =

- Founded: 1926
- Region: Staffordshire, Shropshire, Leicestershire, Worcestershire, West Midlands, England
- Teams: 32 (2023–24)
- Current champions: Lichfield City FC

The JW Hunt Cup is an annual charity football competition for teams based in the West Midlands area of England.

The current defending champions are Lichfield City FC, who defeated Wolverhampton Sporting 3-1 in the 2023–24 final at the Molineux Stadium.

== History ==
The JW Hunt Cup was formed in 1926 to raise funds for the benefit of the local blind. It is named in memory of John William Hunt, a local businessman, keen supporter of charities and founder of the Chillington Tool Company.

The inaugural winners at the end of the 1926–27 season were Short Heath United, beating Cannon Iron on 14 April 1927 at Molineux. Short Heath United are the joint most successful club in the competition alongside Goodyear F.C, with both clubs having won on four occasions. Other successful clubs in the competition include Richmond Swifts and Great Wyrley.

The 2021–22 tournament set a then-record for the longest penalty shootout in British football history, as AFC Wulfrunians defeated Lane Head after 44 penalty kicks. The record was broken a few months later by Washington and Bedlington Terriers with 54 penalty kicks.

== Charity ==
The cup aims to raise money for local blind charities, raising over £360,000 since its formation in 1926. In 2018, the cup committee presented a cheque worth £10,000 to the Beacon Centre for the blind.

== JW Hunt Cup winners ==
Year	Team
2023/24	Lichfield City
2022/23	Lichfield City
2021/22	Lye Town
2020/21	Not held
2019/20	Not held
2018/19	Sporting Khalsa
2016/17	Alvechurch
2015/16	Sporting Khalsa
2014/15	Tividale
2013/14	Tividale
2012/13	Black Country Rangers
2011/12	Black Country Rangers
2010/11	AFC Wulfrunians
2009/10	Bloxwich United
2008/09	Bloxwich United
2007/08	Wednesfield F.C.
2006/07	Wyrley Rangers
2005/06	Great Wyrley
2004/05	Great Wyrley
2003/04	Great Wyrley
2002/03	Old Wulfrunians
2001/02	Marston Wolves
2000/01	Ounsdale
1999/00	Continental Star
1998/99	Blackheath Electrodrives
1997/98	Tamworth
1996/97	Richmond Swifts
1995/96	Richmond Swifts
1994/95	Richmond Swifts
1993/94	Walsall Phoenix
1992/93	Handrahan Timbers
1991/92	Old Wulfrunians
1990/91	Bilston Community College
1989/90	Shifnal Town
1988/89	Bloxwich Strollers
1987/88	Weston United
1986/87	Harvey Plant FC
1985/86	Deeleys FC
1984/85	Lower Gornal YL
1983/84	Ettingshall Holy Trinity
1982/83	Ettingshall Holy Trinity
1981/82	New World
1980/81	John Thompsons
1979/80	Kingswinford United
1978/79	Sedgley Rovers
1977/78	Willenhall Town
1976/77	Wolverhampton United
1975/76	Manders FC
1974/75	Whitmore Old Boys
1973/74	Northicote Old Boys
1972/73	Wednesfield Town
1971/72	Wednesfield Town
1970/71	Willenhall Town
1969/70	Wednesfield Social
1968/69	Public Works
1967/68	Albrighton
1966/67	Gibbons Bros.
1965/66	Albrighton
1964/65	Whitmore Old Boys
1963/64	Stewarts & Lloyds
1962/63	Highley Miners
1961/62	Madeley Miners
1960/61	Whitmore Old Boys
1959/60	Wednesbury Tube
1958/59	Donnington Wood
1957/58	Jenks & Catell
1956/57	Claregate Old Boys
1955/56	Sankey (Hadley)
1954/55	Sankey (Hadley)
1953/54	Marandola
1952/53	Goodyear FC
1951/52	Goodyear FC
1950/51	Goodyear
1949/50	Stafford Road Works
1948/49	Lower Gornal
1947/48	Walsall Trinity
1946/47	C. Snapes
1945/46	Oxley
1944/45	Oxley
1943/44	Oxley
1942/43	Coley Hay
1941/42	Butlers Sports
1940/41	Albion Works
1939/40	Yale & Town
1938/39	Essington St. John
1937/38	Goodyear FC
1936/37	Heath Town United
1935/36	Short Heath United
1934/35	Streetly Works
1933/34	Streetly Works
1932/33	Blakenhall Villa
1931/32	Short Heath United
1930/31	Hickmans Institute
1929/30	Short Heath United
1928/29	Tarmac
1927/28	Tarmac
1926/27	Short Heath United
