= Wyrley Rangers F.C. =

Wyrley Rangers
- Full name: Wyrley Rangers Football Club
- Nickname: The Eagles
- Founded: 1988
- Dissolved: 2007
- Ground: Long Lane Park; Essington; West Midlands
- Capacity: ca. 100 covered stands
- 2006–07: West Midlands (Regional) League; Premier Division, 14th
| Home colours | Away colours |

Wyrley Rangers F.C. was a football club based in Essington, Wolverhampton, England. The club was established in 1988. In 1998, they joined the West Midlands (Regional) League Division One North and gained promotion to the Premier Division in 2005. The club folded in 2007.

== History ==
Wyrley Rangers Football Club was founded in 1998 and immediately joined the West Midlands Regional League, however after one season they left that league to play in the Wolverhampton Combination. They re-joined the West Midlands League in 2001, playing in Division One North, and finished mid-table in their first season. In 2003, they absorbed another club from the same division, Marston Wolves.

In the 2004–05 season, the club started off poorly but turned their fortunes around after the arrival of Tony Wall as manager, with a run of 12 successive wins carrying them to third place in the Division One table. Two resignations from the Premier Division gave them an opportunity to apply for Premier status, which they were granted providing that the appropriate ground grading criteria could be met prior to the League AGM on 30 June.

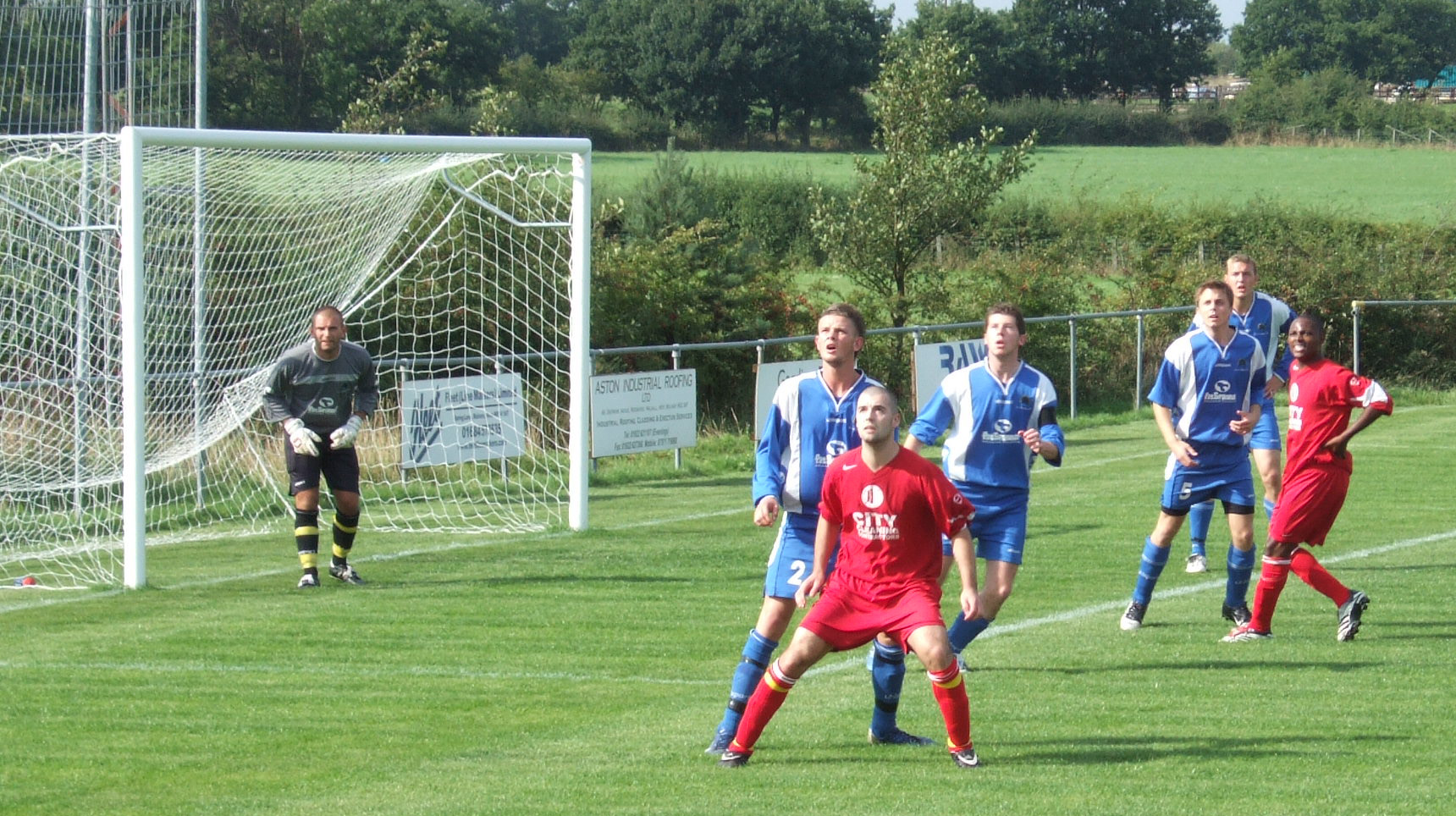
Wyrley Rangers (in red) take on Gornal Athletic in a WMRL game in 2006.

Plans to upgrade the ground for possible future Premier Division status had always been on the cards, but suddenly the work had to completed in less than three weeks. The club completed the work with just hours to spare and were therefore able to take their place in the Premier Division, where they finished in 5th place in their first season and winning the Premier League Cup.

In 2007, after finishing 14th in their second season in the Premier Division and winning the league's JW Hunt Cup, the club withdrew from the West Midlands (Regional) League and folded.

== Ground ==
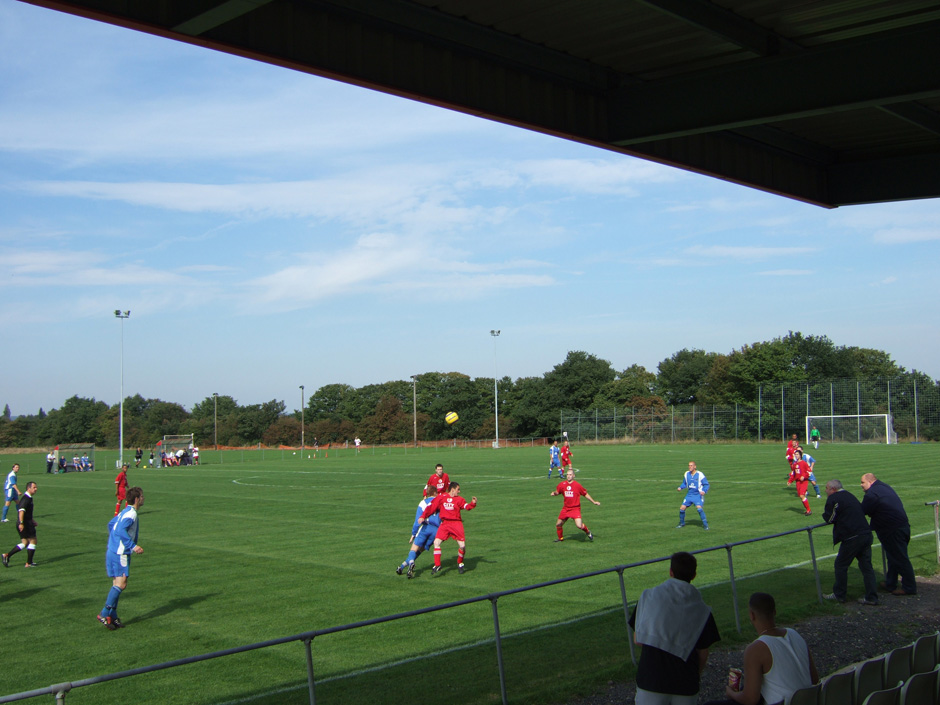
Wyrley Rangers' ground in Long Lane.

The work undertaken to bring Long Lane Park up to Premier Division standard in 2005 saw the addition of three new changing rooms, a players' entrance, hard standing around the ground, and a 100-seater cantilever stand. The ground also boasts floodlights. Since the demise of Wyrley Rangers, it has been used by WMRL Division One team Wyrley Juniors FC, Wyrley Ladies FC and Warstone Wanderers.

== Club records ==
- Best league position: 5th in West Midlands (Regional) League Premier Division, 2005–06
- Best FA Cup performance: none
- Best FA Vase performance: 2nd qualifying round, 2006–07
