= GWFC =

The abbreviation GWFC may refer to one of the following:

- Glasshoughton Welfare F.C.
- Great Wyrley F.C.
- Great West Football Conference US college football conference now called the Great West Conference
