= South Normanton F.C. =

Coordinates: 53°6′22.5936″N 1°20′49.1022″W

South Normanton
- Full name: South Normanton Football Club
- Nickname(s): Shiners
- Founded: 2016
- Dissolved: 2018
- Ground: Lees Lane, South Normanton

South Normanton Football Club was a football club based in South Normanton, Derbyshire.

== History ==
The club was formed as a feeder club of South Normanton Athletic. They joined the South Division of the Central Midlands League in 2016 and entered the FA Vase for the first time in the 2017–18 season. However, in March 2018 the club resigned from the league, resulting in their record being expunged.

== Records ==
- Best FA Vase performance: First qualifying round, 2017–18
