= Tooting & Mitcham Wanderers F.C. =

Coordinates: 51°24′11.96″N 0°13′37.33″W

Tooting & Mitcham Wanderers
- Full name: Tooting & Mitcham Wanderers Football Club
- Nickname(s): Terrors
- Founded: 18 June 2013
- Dissolved: 2017
- Ground: Malden Vale Sports Ground, Raynes Park

Tooting & Mitcham Wanderers Football Club was a football club based in London, England. They played at Raynes Park Vale's Malden Vale Sports Ground.

== History ==
The club were established on 18 June 2013 and joined Division Two of the Surrey South Eastern Combination. Their first competitive match on 7 September 2013 saw them beat Sutton High 3–1. After finishing fourth in the division they transferred to the Premier Division of the Middlesex County League.

In 2015–16 the club entered the FA Vase for the first time and were given a bye in the first qualifying round. In the second qualifying round they lost 2–0 at Canterbury City. They entered the Vase again the following season, beating Seaford Town 3–1 in the second qualifying round before losing 9–0 at Eastbourne Town in the first round.

The club folded shortly after the start of the 2017–18 season.

== Records ==
- Best FA Vase performance: First round, 2016–17
