= Cricklewood Wanderers F.C. =

Cricklewood Wanderers FC
- Full name: Cricklewood Wanderers Football Club
- Nickname: The Wood
- Founded: 2011
- Dissolved: 2024
- Ground: Vale Farm, Wembley
- Capacity: 1600. 250 seats
- Chairman: Carmen Llorente
- Manager: Naim Berisha
- League: Middlesex County League Premier Division
- 2025–26: Middlesex County League Premier Division, 8th of 17
Home colours

Cricklewood Wanderers Football Club was a football club based in Wembley, London, England. They are currently members of the Middlesex County League Premier Division.

== History ==
The club was founded in 2011 by a group of young people from north-west London. and joined Division One (Central and East) of the Middlesex County League. In 2012–13 they won the division, earning promotion to the Premier Division. The club also gained FA Charter Standard Award status. They entered the FA Vase for the first time in 2015. The 2018–19 season saw the club reach the final of the Alec Smith Premier Division Cup but lost out to St. Panteleimon F.C. on penalties.

At the end of the 2023-24 season, Cricklewood merged with local team Eagles Land FC to form Eagles Land Cricklewood F.C. The new club took the place of Cricklewood in the Middlesex County League Premier Division.

== Ground ==
The club played their home games at Vale Farm. The ground is also used by Wembley F.C. and was a former ground of Hendon F.C.

== Honours ==
- Middlesex County League
  - Division One (Central and East) champions 2012–13

== Records ==
- Best FA Vase performance: Second round, 2015–16
