= Wolverhampton Sporting C.F.C. =

Association football club in England

Coordinates: 52°39′39.6″N 2°0′29.4″W

Wolverhampton Sporting
- Full name: Wolverhampton Sporting Community Football Club
- Nicknames: Wolves, Sporting
- Founded: 2001
- Ground: Pride Park, Great Wyrley
- Chairman: John Quarry
- Manager: Andy Parkes & Scott Moore
- League: None
- 2025–26: North West Counties League Division One South (withdrew)
Home colours	Away colours

Wolverhampton Sporting Community Football Club is a football club representing Wolverhampton, West Midlands, England. They play at Pride Park in nearby Great Wyrley

== History ==
The club was established in 2001 as Chubb Sports, a works team of Chubb Locks and Safe. However, when the factory closed down and the site (including the pitches) were sold off, the club were renamed Heath Town Rangers, a name chosen by the players. After success in the Bilston Partnership Youth League, they entered a team into the youth division of the West Midlands (Regional) League in 2005. After winning the youth division in 2006–07, the club entered an adult team into Division Two of the West Midlands (Regional) League. In their first season in the league they won the Staffordshire Challenge Cup, as well as claiming the Division Two title, resulting in promotion to Division One. The following season saw them finish third in Division One, earning promotion to the Premier Division. During the 2010–11 season the club were renamed Wolverhampton Sporting Community.

Sporting won the League Cup and the Premier Division title in 2017–18 and were promoted to the Premier Division of the Midland League. However, their first season in the Midland League saw them finish bottom of the Premier Division, resulting in relegation back to the Premier Division of the West Midlands (Regional) League. In 2021 the club were transferred to Division One of the Midland League. After three seasons in the Midland League, they were moved to Division One South of the North West Counties League in 2024. In February 2026 the club resigned from the North West Counties League.

== Ground ==
The club initially played at the Chubb factory site, but were forced to leave when it was sold off for housing. Following a period of ground-sharing at the Cottage Ground in Wednesfield, Sporting moved to Pride Park in Great Wyrley in 2014.

== Honours ==
- West Midlands (Regional) League
  - Premier Division champions 2017–18
  - Division Two champions 2006–07
  - League Cup winners 2017–18
- Staffordshire Challenge Cup
  - Winners 2007–08

== Records ==
- Best FA Cup performance: Extra preliminary round, 2016–17, 2017–18, 2018–19, 2019–20
- Best FA Vase performance: Fifth round, 2017–18

== See also ==
- Wolverhampton Sporting C.F.C. players
- Wolverhampton Sporting C.F.C. managers
