= Gravesham Borough F.C. =

Gravesham Borough Youth Football Club
- Full name: Gravesham Borough Youth Football Club
- Nickname: The Boro
- Founded: 1927
- Dissolved: 2018
Home colours	Away colours

Gravesham Borough Football Club was a football club based in Northfleet, Kent, England.

== History ==
The club was established in 1927. The club was originally known as Bowater Thames and joined the Kent County League in 1971. In 1973 they changed their name to Bowaters in 1973 and three years later again to Bowater Sports.

The 1985–86 campaign saw the club finish as winners of the Senior Division of the western section of the Kent County League. The following season saw the club play under a different name, this time Bowater Scott Sports & Social. 1987 saw the club again change its name to Scott Sports and Social. In 1992 the Kent County League was restructured so that the top teams in the east and west sections would now play each other in the newly formed Premier Division and the club was placed in this new division.

The club stayed in the Premier Division until the end of the 1994–95 campaign when they finished bottom of the league and were relegated to Division One West. The club in 1996 again changed its name, this time to Beauwater. They achieved promotion back to the Premier Division when they finished as runners-up in Division One West at the end of the 1999–2000 campaign. In 2005 the club changed their name to Fleet Leisure, when the sports and social club the team is based at was taken over by Fleet Leisure Ltd. At the end of the 2012–13 campaign after finishing fourth in the Premier Division the club gained promotion to the Kent Invicta Football League.

For the 2014–15 season the club changed its name from Fleet Leaisure to Gravesham Borough. The 2016–17 season saw the club enter the FA Cup for the first time in their history when they entered the competition in the preliminary qualification round. They folded prior to the 2018–19 season after being unable to raise the funding required to continue playing.

The club name has been continued by Gravesham Borough Youth Football Club, who in 2026 entered a senior side back into the pyramid for the first time since the club's folding in 2019, joining Division 2 of the Rochester & District Football League.

== Ground ==
During the 2010s the club groundshared with Rochester United and Chatham Town.

== Honours ==
Former club logo

=== League honours ===
- Kent County League Premier Division :
  - Runners-up (1): 2008–09
- Kent County League Senior Division Western Section :
  - Winners (1): 1985–86
- Kent County League Division One West:
  - Runners-up (3): 1996–97, 1998–99, 1999–2000

=== Cup honours ===
- Kent County League Senior Challenge Cup :
  - Winners (1): 1980–81
- Inter Regional Challenge Cup :
  - Winners (1): 2007–08
  - Runners-up (2): 1990–91, 2009–10
- G R Roofing Champions Trophy:
  - Runners-up (1): 2008–09
- West Kent Challenge Shield:
  - Winners (1): 1999–2000
