= Cornwall County Football Association =

Governing body of football in Cornwall, England

- Formation: 1889
- Headquarters: Bodmin
- Chief Executive Officer: Dawn Aberdeen
- Chairman: Geoff Lee
- Website: Cornwall FA

The Cornwall County Football Association, also known as the Cornwall FA, is the governing body of football in Cornwall. Formed in 1889, it is responsible for the administration, control, promotion and development of football at all levels throughout the county.

== Organisation ==
The Cornwall County Football Association was formed on 18 September 1889, at a meeting held at the Royal Hotel in Truro. Representatives from Dunheved College (Launceston), Liskeard, Millbrook, Penzance, Porthcurno, Probus, Torpoint and Truro were involved in the meeting. The CCFA relocated to its present headquarters at Kernow House, Bodmin, in December 2009. Almost 400 clubs are affiliated with the association today, with approximately 500 teams playing 11-a-side football in Cornwall, making it the most popular sport in the county.

There are a further 300 teams playing youth football, and 250 playing small-sides football, as the association aims to encourage people of all ages, genders, and abilities to be involved in the game. The association's most prestigious tournament, The Cornwall Senior Cup, was first played at Liskeard on 3 April 1893, where Penzance defeated Launceston 5–0. In addition to the Senior Cup, the CCFA organises the Junior Cup, the Sunday Cup, the Women's Cup, the Durning Lawrence Charity Cup, the Under-18 PM Bartlett Trophy League, the Under-18 Rathbone Trophy, the Under-16 Luke Cup, and the Under-16 Girls' League.

There are 31 leagues that are affiliated with the CCFA, that cover 11-a-side, six and five-a-side, men's, women's, and youngsters from under-9 to under-18 years of age. There are three representative teams who compete at county level, the women's, youth, and girls' under-16s. The county's colours are gold and black.

== Representative team ==
The men's representative team has represented Cornwall against international, as well as other county sides. Cornwall played three friendly matches against Trinidad & Tobago who toured England in 1953, and have competed against Guernsey and Jersey on a regular basis since 1998. The county is affiliated with the FA, and therefore cannot compete at the full international level, such as the FIFA World Cup, and the UEFA European Football Championship.

Date	Location	Opponent	Result (Note: Cornwall's goal tally in the scoreline is listed first.)
26 September 1953	Home	(Trinidad and Tobago) Trinidad & Tobago	3–6
30 September 1953	Home	(Trinidad and Tobago) Trinidad & Tobago	2–4
3 October 1953	Home	(Trinidad and Tobago) Trinidad & Tobago	1–1
21 November 1998	Away	Guernsey	6–1
20 February 2000	Home	Guernsey	1–2

Date	Location	Opponent	Result
26 October 2002	Away	Jersey	3–0
11 October 2003	Home	Jersey	1–0
16 October 2004	Away	Jersey	4–1
15 October 2005	Home	Jersey	3–2
24 March 2007	Home	Guernsey	1–1

== Affiliated Leagues ==
=== Men's Saturday Leagues ===
- South West Peninsula League**
- St Piran League**

Defunct Leagues

- Cornwall Combination League**
- Duchy League**
- East Cornwall League**
- Trelawny League**

Footnote: **Part of the English football league system.

=== Women and Girls Leagues ===
- Cornwall Women's Football League*
- Cornwall Girls League

Footnote: *Part of the Women's football league system.

=== Men's Sunday Leagues ===
- Cornwall Sunday League
- West Cornwall Sunday League

=== Youth Leagues ===
- Kernow Youth League
- East Cornwall Youth League

=== Other Leagues ===
- Cornwall disAbility Football League
- Cornwall Veterans League

=== Small Sided Leagues ===
- Carn Brea 5 a side League
- Cornwall 6 a side – St Austell
- Penryn Football Development Centre – 5-a-side league
- Soccer Nights – adult men's leagues in the Truro, Camborne, Penzance & Bodmin areas

=== Futsal Leagues ===
- Futsal League – Cornwall College Camborne
- Futsal League – St Austell's Polkyth Leisure Centre
- Futsal League – Torpoint & Rame Community Sports Centre

== Disbanded or Amalgamated Leagues ==
A number of leagues that were affiliated to the Cornwall County FA have disbanded or amalgamated with other leagues including:

- Bodmin and District League
- Falmouth & Helston League and the Mining Division League (amalgamated in 2011 to become the Trelawny League)
- Launceston and District League
- Liskeard and District League and St. Austell and District League (amalgamated to become Duchy League)
- West Penwith League
- Amor Shield

== Affiliated Member Clubs ==
Members of the Cornwall County Football Association include;

- Biscovey
- Bodmin Town
- Bude Town
- Callington Town
- Camelford
- Dobwalls
- Edgcumbe
- Falmouth Town
- Foxhole Stars
- Godolphin Atlantic
- Hayle
- Helston Athletic
- Holmans Sports Club
- Illogan RBL
- Lanreath
- Launceston
- Liskeard Athletic
- Ludgvan
- Millbrook
- Morwenstow
- Mousehole
- Mullion
- Nanpean Rovers
- Newquay
- Penryn Athletic
- Penzance
- Perranporth
- Perranwell
- Polperro
- Porthleven
- Portreath
- Probus
- RNAS Culdrose
- Roche
- Saltash United
- Sticker
- St Agnes
- St Austell
- St Blazey
- St Columb Major
- St Day
- St Dennis
- St Dominick
- St Ives Town
- St Just
- St Stephen
- St Stephens Borough
- Torpoint Athletic
- Troon
- Truro City
- Wadebridge Town
- Wendron United

== Competitions ==
=== Cups ===
Competition	2021-22 winners
Cornwall Senior Cup	------
Cornwall Junior Cup	------
Cornwall Charity Cup	------
Cornwall Women's Cup	Helston Athletic Women
Cornwall Sunday Cup	------
Rathbone Trophy (U18)	Sticker
Luke Cup (U16)	------

=== Leagues ===
Competition	2009–10 winners
Cornwall Combination	Illogan RBL
East Cornwall League	Torpoint Athletic
Falmouth Helston League	Pendeen Rovers
Duchy League	St Teath
Mining League	Illogan
Cornwall Women's League	Charlestown
Cornwall Sunday League	St Blazey
