= 1991–92 South Western Football League =

Association football season

South Western League
- Season: 1991–92

The 1991–92 South Western Football League season was the 41st in the history of South Western League. The league consisted of 18 teams.

== League table ==
South Western League
- Season: 1991–92
- Champions: Falmouth Town
- Promoted: Clyst Rovers
- Relegated: Bugle

The division featured 18 teams, 17 from last season and 1 new team:

- Devon & Cornwall Police

Pos	Team	Pld	W	D	L	GF	GA	GD	Pts	Promotion or relegation
1	Falmouth Town (C)	34	26	5	3	91	20	+71	57	
2	Newquay	34	23	5	6	88	31	+57	51	
3	Bugle (R)	34	16	9	9	65	46	+19	41	Joined East Cornwall Premier League
4	Truro City	34	14	11	9	74	49	+25	39	
5	Bodmin Town	34	15	9	10	53	51	+2	39	
6	Clyst Rovers (P)	34	15	8	11	59	60	−1	38	Promotion to Western League Division One
7	Appledore/B A A C	34	16	5	13	78	56	+22	37	
8	Porthleven	34	14	8	12	77	69	+8	36	
9	St Blazey	34	15	6	13	72	67	+5	36	
10	Torpoint Athletic	34	14	7	13	49	50	−1	35	
11	Holsworthy	34	9	16	9	37	46	−9	34	
12	Wadebridge Town	34	12	7	15	45	52	−7	31	
13	St Austell	34	10	8	16	45	63	−18	28	
14	Millbrook	34	9	9	16	45	70	−25	27	
15	Launceston	34	8	6	20	45	73	−28	22	
16	Devon & Cornwall Police	34	7	8	19	43	78	−35	22	
17	Tavistock	34	8	5	21	53	79	−26	21	
18	Penzance	34	7	4	23	35	94	−59	18	

Rules for classification: 1) points; 2) goal difference; 3) number of goals scored.
(C) Champions; (P) Promoted; (R) Relegated
