= Nanpean Rovers A.F.C. =

Ben club in Cornwall, England

Nanpean Rovers
- Full name: Nanpean Rovers Association Football Club
- Founded: 1901; 125 years ago
- Ground: Victoria Bottoms
- Coordinates: 50.3685°N 4.8702°W
- League: St Piran League; Division One East

Nanpean Rovers Association Football Club are a football club based in Nanpean, England.

Nanpean were formed in 1901. In 1959, they were founder members of the Cornwall Combination, and won the title the following year. In 1961, they joined the South Western League, where they remained for twelve seasons. Nanpean were champions of the East Cornwall Premier League in 1995 and 1997, but finished in the bottom two for their final nine seasons in the league, and resigned midway through the 2017–18 season. They rejoined the league in 2022, changing their name from F.C. to A.F.C.; as of 2023–24, they play in Division One East of the St Piran League.

Nanpean played in the 1968–69 FA Cup, beating St Blazey after two replays, before losing to Wadebridge Town in the next round; the following season, they were defeated by Wadebridge again, and have not entered the competition since. The also reached the final of the Cornwall Senior Cup in 1960 and 1997 losing to St Blazey and Falmouth Town respectively.

== Victoria Bottoms ==
Since 1936 Nanpean Rovers have played their home games at Victoria Bottoms Playing Field, a reclaimed china clay pit. Created during the Great Depression, unemployed men spent two years creating a huge, terraced arena with football pitch, cricket ground and tennis courts. At the time, perhaps optimistically, it was claimed the ground could hold 20,000 spectators.

In the 2020 book British Football's Greatest Grounds, Victoria Bottoms was voted one of the top grounds to visit in the country.
