= 2006–07 South Western Football League =

Association football season

South Western League
- Season: 2006–07

The 2006–07 South Western Football League season was the 56th and last in the history of South Western League. The league consisted of 19 teams.

== League table ==
South Western League
- Season: 2006–07
- Champions: St Blazey
- Promoted: None
- Relegated: None

The division featured 19 teams, 17 from last season and 2 new teams:

- Saltash United from Western League
- Plymouth Argyle "A"

Pos	Team	Pld	W	D	L	GF	GA	GD	Pts	Promotion or relegation
1	St Blazey (C)	36	25	7	4	94	37	+57	82	Joined SWPL Premier Division
2	Liskeard Athletic	36	25	7	4	88	34	+54	82	Joined SWPL Premier Division
3	Saltash United	36	25	6	5	88	30	+58	81	Joined SWPL Premier Division
4	Bodmin Town	36	24	7	5	82	21	+61	79	Joined SWPL Premier Division
5	Plymouth Argyle "A"	36	22	8	6	91	34	+57	74	Did not join South West Peninsula League
6	Plymouth Parkway	36	17	7	12	81	63	+18	58	Joined SWPL Premier Division
7	Tavistock	36	16	8	12	75	57	+18	56	Joined SWPL Premier Division
8	Launceston	36	16	7	13	82	48	+34	55	Joined SWPL Premier Division
9	Porthleven	36	16	7	13	61	64	−3	55	Joined SWPL Division One West
10	Falmouth Town	36	14	7	15	63	55	+8	49	Joined SWPL Premier Division
11	Torpoint Athletic	36	13	6	17	52	66	−14	45	Joined SWPL Premier Division
12	Newquay	36	13	4	19	65	82	−17	43	Joined SWPL Division One West
13	Penryn Athletic	36	12	6	18	66	74	−8	42	Joined SWPL Division One West
14	Callington Town	36	10	9	17	54	60	−6	39	Joined SWPL Division One West
15	Wadebridge Town	36	8	9	19	47	63	−16	33	Joined SWPL Division One West
16	Penzance	36	6	10	20	50	84	−34	28	Joined SWPL Division One West
17	Millbrook	36	7	5	24	41	101	−60	26	Joined SWPL Division One West
18	St Austell	36	5	5	26	34	116	−82	20	Joined SWPL Division One West
19	Goonhavern Athletic	36	4	3	29	29	154	−125	15	Joined SWPL Division One West

Rules for classification: 1) points; 2) goal difference; 3) number of goals scored.
(C) Champions
