= 1990–91 South Western Football League =

South Western League
- Season: 1990–91

The 1990–91 South Western Football League season was the 40th in the history of South Western League. The league consisted of 17 teams.

== Stadia and locations ==
Team	Location	County	Stadium
Bodmin Town	Bodmin	Cornwall	Priory Park
St Blazey	St Blazey	Cornwall	Blaise Park
Falmouth Town	Falmouth	Cornwall	Bickland Park
Newquay	Newquay	Cornwall	Mount Wise
St Austell	St Austell	Cornwall	Poltair Park
Torpoint Athletic	Torpoint	Cornwall	The Mill
Truro City	Truro	Cornwall	Treyew Road
Bugle	Bugle	Cornwall	
Appledore/B A A C	Appledore	Devon	Marshford
Wadebridge Town	Wadebridge	Cornwall	Bodieve Park
Millbrook	Millbrook	Cornwall	Jenkins Park
Tavistock	Tavistock	Devon	Langsford Park
Porthleven	Porthleven	Cornwall	Gala Parc
Clyst Rovers	Clyst Honiton	Devon	Waterslade Park
Launceston	Launceston	Cornwall	Pennygillam
Holsworthy	Holsworthy	Devon	Upcott Field
Penzance	Penzance	Cornwall	Penlee Park

== League table ==
South Western League
- Season: 1990–91
- Champions: Bodmin Town
- Promoted: None
- Relegated: None

The division featured 17 teams, all from last season.

Pos	Team	Pld	W	D	L	GF	GA	GD	Pts
1	Bodmin Town (C)	32	25	5	2	87	31	+56	55
2	St Blazey	32	22	8	2	105	29	+76	52
3	Falmouth Town	32	18	9	5	82	39	+43	45
4	Newquay	32	20	5	7	73	40	+33	45
5	St Austell	32	17	7	8	83	46	+37	41
6	Torpoint Athletic	32	16	8	8	66	37	+29	40
7	Truro City	32	16	6	10	67	44	+23	38
8	Bugle	32	16	6	10	57	37	+20	38
9	Appledore/B A A C	32	13	5	14	66	59	+7	31
10	Wadebridge Town	32	10	8	14	47	52	−5	28
11	Millbrook	32	12	3	17	70	79	−9	27
12	Tavistock	32	8	9	15	46	67	−21	25
13	Porthleven	32	11	2	19	52	72	−20	24
14	Clyst Rovers	32	10	1	21	43	100	−57	21
15	Launceston	32	6	8	18	46	75	−29	20
16	Holsworthy	32	3	4	25	32	110	−78	10
17	Penzance	32	1	2	29	31	136	−105	4

Rules for classification: 1) points; 2) goal difference; 3) number of goals scored.
(C) Champions
