= St Mawgan F.C. =

Association football club in England

St Mawgan
- Full name: St Mawgan Football Club
- Founded: 1984
- Ground: Trevarrian Park, Mawgan Porth
- League: South West Peninsula League Premier Division West
- 2025–26: St Piran League Premier Division East, 2nd of 16 (promoted)

St Mawgan F.C. is a football club based in Mawgan Porth, near St Mawgan, Cornwall. They are currently members of the South West Peninsula League Premier Division West and play at Trevarrian Park.

== History ==
Formed in 1984, St Mawgan F.C. existed alongside another club, R.A.F. St Mawgan F.C., who played in the Cornwall Combination from the league's inception in 1959 to 1975, and again from 1984 to 1996.

St Mawgan F.C. competed in the Duchy League from their formation until 2019, finishing third in the Premier Division in 2010–11. They were relegated to Division One in 2012–13, but promoted back to the Premier Division in 2014–15. Relegated again the following season, they were immediately promoted back to the Premier Division after finishing fifth in Division One in 2016–17. They finished runners-up in 2018–19 and became founder members of the new St Piran Football League East Division.

When the St Piran league was restructured in 2023, St Mawgan were members of Premier Division East, finishing as runners-up in 2023–24. They were runners-up again in 2025–26, earning promotion to the South West Peninsula League Premier Division West after a 2–0 win against Sticker Reserves on 22 April 2026.
