= 1998–99 FA Vase =

Football Association Vase

Tournament details
- Country: England; Wales

Final positions
- Champions: Tiverton Town
- Runners-up: Bedlington Terriers

The 1998–99 FA Vase was the 25th season of the FA Vase, an annual football competition for teams in the lower reaches of the English football league system.

Tiverton Town won the competition, beating Bedlington Terriers in the final.

== Calendar ==
| Round | Date |
|---|---|
| First round qualifying | 12 September 1998 |
| Second round qualifying | 10 October 1998 |
| First round proper | 7 November 1998 |
| Second round proper | 28 November 1998 |
| Third round proper | 12 December 1998 |
| Fourth round proper | 9 January 1999 |
| Fifth round proper | 30 January 1999 |
| Quarter-finals | 20 February 1999 |
| Semi-finals | 13 March and 20 March 1999 |
| Final | 16 May 1999 |

== First round qualifying ==
| Tie no | Home team | Score | Away team | Attendance |
|---|---|---|---|---|
| 1 | Goole AFC | 1-0 | Fleetwood Freeport | 255 |
| 2 | Marske United | 1–5 | Shildon | 140 |
| 3 | Woodley Sports | W.O. | Blackpool Wren Rovers | |
| 4 | Sheffield | 1-5 | Consett | 74 |
| 5 | Liversedge | 3–2 | Chadderton | 94 |
| 6 | Glasshoughton Welfare | 2-4 | Maltby Main | 46 |
| 7 | Newcastle Blue Star | 1-3 | Ossett Town | 90 |
| 8 | Parkgate | 0–2 | Shotton Comrades | 46 |
| 9 | Kirby Muxloe | 1-0 | Stafford Town | 83 |
| 10 | Ludlow Town | 1–3 | Nettleham | 98 |
| 11 | Boston Town | 1–2 | Handrahan Timbers | 61 |
| 12 | Studley BKL | 0–8 | Kington Town | 150 |
| 13 | Malvern Town | 2–0 | Bilston Community College | 75 |
| 14 | Highfield Rangers | 3–1 | Barrow Town | 32 |
| 15 | Downes Sports | 1–3 | Stourport Swifts | 23 |
| 16 | Mickleover Sports | 3–2 | Kings Norton Town | 72 |
| 17 | Mildenhall Town | 4–1 | Toddington Rovers | 123 |
| 18 | Buckingham Athletic | 4–1 | Viking Sports | 38 |
| 19 | Kempston Rovers | 0–1 | Hullbridge Sports | 50 |
| 20 | Bedford United | 1–2 | Ruislip Manor | 44 |

| Tie no | Home team | Score | Away team | Attendance |
|---|---|---|---|---|
| 21 | Sawbridgeworth Town | 1-2 | Wivenhoe Town | 101 |
| 22 | Islington St Mary's | 2–1 | Burnham | 37 |
| 23 | Kingsbury Town | 0–2† | Milton Keynes City | 20 |
| 24 | Downham Town | 0–1 | East Thurrock United | 57 |
| 25 | Cockfosters | 1–2 | Stowmarket Town | 80 |
| 26 | Brimsdown Rovers | 1–3 | Southend Manor | 45 |
| 27 | Slade Green | 0–1 | Merstham Town | 68 |
| 28 | Sheppey United | 3–2 | Erith Town | 76 |
| 29 | Lordswood | 1–3 | Newbury | 76 |
| 30 | Greenwich Borough | 1–2 | Beckenham Town | 65 |
| 31 | East Cowes Victoria | 1–2 | Hungerford Town | 56 |
| 32 | Redhill | 2–1 | Whitehawk | 105 |
| 33 | Blackfield & Langley | 1–4 | Eastleigh | 129 |
| 34 | Cray Wanderers | 0–1 | Abingdon United | 74 |
| 35 | Fareham Town | 3–0 | Lancing | 106 |
| 36 | Truro City | 2–0 | Willand Rovers | 196 |
| 37 | Street | 2–1 | Frome Town | 123 |
| 38 | Harrow Hill | 1–3 | Pershore Town | 68 |
| 39 | Highworth Town | 0–2 | Brislington | 139 |

Notes:

- † = After Extra Time

== Second round qualifying ==
| Tie no | Home team | Score | Away team | Attendance |
|---|---|---|---|---|
| 1 | Shildon | 2-3† | Maine Road | 127 |
| 2 | Crook Town | 2-3 | Bootle | 78 |
| 3 | Pickering Town | 1-2 | Washington | 60 |
| 4 | South Shields | 1-0 | Ashington | 78 |
| 5 | Armthorpe Welfare | 0-2 | Goole A.F.C. | 176 |
| 6 | Prescot Cables | 5-1 | Holker Old Boys | 110 |
| 7 | Tadcaster Albion | 1-3 | Selby Town | 120 |
| 8 | Skelmersdale United | 1-2 | Liversedge | 123 |
| 9 | Thackley | 0-1 | Brodsworth Miners Welfare | 96 |
| 10 | Stockton | 2-4 | Chester-le-Street Town | 81 |
| 11 | Cheadle Town | 2-3 | Ramsbottom United | 70 |
| 12 | Rossendale United | 2-1 | East Manchester | 114 |
| 13 | Hall Road Rangers | 1-2 | St Helens Town | 87 |
| 14 | Yorkshire Amateur | 0-8 | Vauxhall Motors | 58 |
| 15 | Grimethorpe Miners Welfare | 0-3 | Hallam | 35 |
| 16 | Peterlee Newtown | 2-3 | Rossington Main | 32 |
| 17 | Salford City | 2-0 | Northallerton Town | 40 |
| 18 | Hebburn | 0-1 | Ossett Albion | 82 |
| 19 | Garforth Town | 5-1 | Willington | 320 |
| 20 | Ryhope Community Association | 0-2 | Morpeth Town | 35 |
| 21 | Louth United | 2-1 | Jarrow Roofing BCA | 48 |
| 22 | Maltby Main | 0-3 | Brandon United | 58 |
| 23 | Atherton Collieries | 4-4† | Harrogate Railway Athletic | 80 |
| replay | Harrogate Railway Athletic | 2-1 | Atherton Collieries | 41 |
| 24 | Oldham Town | 2-5 | Easington Colliery | 39 |
| 25 | Eccleshill United | 5-0 | Penrith | 84 |
| 26 | Ossett Town | 2-0 | Whickham | 73 |
| 27 | Woodley Sports | 2-0 | Prudhoe Town | 80 |
| 28 | Shotton Comrades | 1-3 | West Allotment Celtic | 45 |
| 29 | Evenwood Town | 1-3 | Consett | 62 |
| 30 | Bacup Borough | 1-3 | Darwen | 72 |
| 31 | Worsborough Bridge Athletic | 5-3 | Horden CW | 90 |
| 32 | Nantwich Town | 4-1 | Glapwell | 59 |
| 33 | Rushall Olympic | 3-1 | Nettleham | 60 |
| 34 | Pelsall Villa | 2-2† | Sandiacre Town | 76 |
| replay | Sandiacre Town | 1-2 | Pelsall Villa | 79 |
| 35 | Gornal Athletic | 4-0 | Walsall Wood | 45 |
| 36 | Ibstock Welfare | 3-1 | Stourport Swifts | 77 |
| 37 | Lye Town | 4-4† | Gedling Town | 30 |
| replay | Gedling Town | 3-0 | Lye Town | 65 |
| 38 | West Midlands Police | 2-2† | Stewarts and Lloyds | 41 |
| replay | Stewarts and Lloyds | 0-1 | West Midlands Police | 52 |
| 39 | Bridgnorth Town | 1-5 | Highfield Rangers | 92 |
| 40 | Kings North | 1-2 | Bolehall Swifts | 48 |
| 41 | Wednesfield | 4-5 | Kirby Muxloe | 65 |
| 42 | Glossop North End | 2-1 | Sandwell Borough | 143 |
| 43 | Long Eaton United | 1-4 | Oldbury United | 83 |
| 44 | Mickleover Sports | 3-3† | Shirebrook Town | 44 |
| replay | Shirebrook Town | 1-3 | Mickleover Sports | 72 |
| 45 | Rainworth Miners Welfare | 3-0 | Holbeach United | 60 |
| 46 | Blackstone | 4-2 | Leek CSOB | 76 |
| 47 | Friar Lane Old Boys | 3-4 | Stratford Town | 76 |
| 48 | Howell Sports | 10-1 | Highgate United | 83 |
| 49 | Willenhall Town | 2-0 | Barwell | 112 |
| 50 | Meir KA | 8-0 | Malvern Town | 68 |
| 51 | Long Buckby | 2-5† | Handrahan Timbers | 67 |
| 52 | Borrowash Victoria | 0-1 | Heanor Town | 130 |
| 53 | Chasetown | 6-0 | Tividale | 71 |
| 54 | Knypersley Victoria | 1-1† | Arnold Town | 90 |
| replay | Arnold Town | 2-0 | Knypersley Victoria | 157 |
| 55 | Newcastle Town | 1-1† | Desborough Town | 101 |
| replay | Desborough Town | 1-2 | Newcastle Town | 142 |
| 56 | Staveley Miners Welfare | 2-1 | Dunkirk | 76 |
| 57 | St Andrews | 3-2 | Halesowen Harriers | 62 |
| 58 | Stapenhill | 1-0 | Anstey Nomads | 63 |
| 59 | Westfields | 2-1 | Shifnal Town | 64 |
| 60 | Boldmere St Michaels | 3-0 | Bourne Town | 90 |
| 61 | Kington Town | 6-4† | Kimberley Town | 188 |
| 62 | Mildenhall Town | 2-0 | Brightlingsea United | 80 |
| 63 | Swaffham Town | 2-1 | Ruislip Manor | 87 |
| 64 | Flackwell Heath | 1-1† | Stansted | 69 |
| replay | Stansted | 4-1 | Flackwell Heath | 32 |
| 65 | Bury Town | 1-3 | Beaconsfield SYCOB | 124 |
| 66 | March Town United | 1-2 | Clapton | 56 |
| 67 | Stowmarket Town | 3-0 | Brook House | 130 |
| 68 | Wingate and Finchley | 0-4 | Ilford | 92 |
| 69 | Yaxley | 7-2 | Soham Town Rangers | 139 |
| 70 | Clacton Town | 3-1 | Hadleigh United | 120 |
| 71 | Islington St Mary's | 2-1 | Southend Manor | 25 |
| 72 | Barkingside | 2-1 | Southall | 50 |
| 73 | Biggleswade Town | 1-4 | Bedford Town | 320 |
| 74 | Needham Market | 1-2 | Saffron Walden Town | 117 |
| 75 | Amersham Town | 1-2 | Tiptree United | 40 |
| 76 | Potton United | 0-5 | Wellingborough Town | 40 |
| 77 | Somersham Town | 0-6 | Hornchurch | 56 |
| 78 | East Thurrock United | 1-0 | Felixstowe Port and Town | 63 |
| 79 | Wivenhoe Town | 2-4† | Harlow Town | 168 |
| 80 | Tibury | 4-0 | Burnham Ramblers | 64 |

| 81 | Thetford Town | 2-0 | Hoddesdon Town | 83 |
| 82 | Fakenham Town | 2-0 | Norwich United | 120 |
| 83 | Edgware Town | 4-2 | Harwich and Parkeston | 110 |
| 84 | Concord Rangers | 1-3† | Ware | 50 |
| 85 | Milton Keynes City | 0-2 | Letchworth | 45 |
| 86 | Watton United | 1-0 | Wootton Blue Cross | 84 |
| 87 | Newmarket Town | 3-0† | Cornard United | 170 |
| 88 | Buckingham Athletic | 3-1 | Witham Town | 48 |
| 89 | Bowers United | 4-1 | Maldon Town | 69 |
| 90 | St Neots Town | 4-4† | Hullbridge Sports | 86 |
| replay | Hullbridge Sports | 1-1† | St Neots Town | 104 |
St Neots advance 5–4 on penalties.
| 91 | Royston Town | 2-1 | Banbury United | 93 |
| 92 | Warboys Town | 0-3 | Chalfont St Peter | 88 |
| 93 | Tring Town | 0-1 | Ford United | 36 |
| 94 | Great Yarmouth Town | 1-0 | Halstead Town | 135 |
| 95 | Bicester Town | 2-2† | Hertford Town | 78 |
| replay | Hertford Town | 0-1 | Bicester Town | 60 |
| 96 | Welwyn Garden City | 3-2† | London Colney | 68 |
| 97 | Waltham Abbey | 3-0 | Ipswich Wanderers | 86 |
| 98 | Eynesbury Rovers | 4-1 | Haverhill Rovers | 43 |
| 99 | Basildon United | 2-1 | Langford | 56 |
| 100 | Ford Sports Daventry | 4-2 | Hillingdon Borough | 53 |
| 101 | Whitton United | 0-3 | Leighton Town | 90 |
| 102 | Harpenden Town | 3-0 | Stanway Rovers | 41 |
| 103 | Aveley | 3-0 | Gorleston | 67 |
| 104 | Hanwell Town | 1-2 | Lowestoft Town | 51 |
| 105 | Hemel Hempstead Town | 2-4† | Cheshunt | 131 |
| 106 | Merstham Town | 2-1 | Eastbourne Town | 73 |
| 107 | Ringmer | 2-0 | Whitchurch United | 80 |
| 108 | Kintbury Rovers | 2-3 | Hassocks | 64 |
| 109 | A.F.C. Totton | 0-1 | Cobham | 92 |
| 110 | Epsom & Ewell | 2-1† | Bracknell Town | 105 |
| 111 | Wick | 5-0 | Hailsham Town | 108 |
| 112 | Raynes Park Vale | 2-3† | Croydon Athletic | 50 |
| 113 | Carterton Town | 0-0† | Sidley United | 35 |
| replay | Sidley United | 1-0 | Carterton Town | 205 |
| 114 | Didcot Town | 5-3† | Farnham Town | 50 |
| 115 | Ash United | 2-1 | Three Bridges | 71 |
| 116 | Dorking | 1-2 | Chichester City | 60 |
| 117 | Redhill | 3-2 | Hythe United | 109 |
| 118 | Abingdon United | 2-0 | East Grinstead Town | 63 |
| 119 | Romsey Town | 1-9 | Hungerford Town | 95 |
| 120 | East Preston | 1-2† | Pagham | 113 |
| 121 | Portsmouth RN | 0-2 | Chipstead | 36 |
| 122 | Metropolitan Police | 0-1 | Fareham Town | 89 |
| 123 | Oakwood | 2-4 | Southwick | 45 |
| 124 | Chatham Town | 2-4† | Cove | 54 |
| 125 | Ramsgate | 3-0 | Newbury | 102 |
| 126 | Corinthian Casuals | 5-1 | Crowborough Athletic | 45 |
| 127 | Saltdean United | 2-4 | Windsor & Eton | 127 |
| 128 | Sheppey United | 2-0 | BAT Sports | 73 |
| 129 | Beckenham Town | 0-2 | Horsham YMCA | 54 |
| 130 | Sandhurst Town | 4-2† | Bournemouth | 87 |
| 131 | Camberley Town | 1-0 | Portfield | 70 |
| 132 | Reading Town | 2-1 | Ashford Town Middlesex | 45 |
| 133 | Bedfont | 3-1† | Selsey | 50 |
| 134 | Lewes | 1-4 | Egham Town | 101 |
| 135 | Gosport Borough | 1-0 | Langney Sports | 109 |
| 136 | Horsham | 0-2 | Camberley Town | 192 |
| 137 | Thamesmead Town | 1-0 | Christchurch | 39 |
| 138 | North Leigh | 4-1 | Arundel | 84 |
| 139 | Godalming and Guildford | 0-4 | Deal Town | 96 |
| 140 | Tunbridge Wells | 3-0 | Wantage Town | 94 |
| 141 | Shoreham | 0-3 | Eastleigh | 112 |
| 142 | Brockenhurst | 5-1 | Chard Town | 94 |
| 143 | Westbury United | 1-4 | Melksham Town | 220 |
| 144 | Bemerton Heath Harlequins | 3-0 | Warminster Town | 85 |
| 145 | Street | 0-2 | Devizes Town | 96 |
| 146 | Brislington | 4-0 | Glastonbury | 32 |
| 147 | Downton | 1-2 | Pershore Town | 53 |
| 148 | Newquay | 3-2 | Hallen | 94 |
| 149 | Backwell United | 0-2 | Paulton Rovers | 103 |
| 150 | Bideford | 2-1 | Welton Rovers | 82 |
| 151 | Barnstaple Town | 1-1† | Odd Down | 171 |
| replay | Odd Down | 1-4 | Barnstaple Town | 59 |
| 152 | St Blazey | 5-1 | Almondsbury Town | 83 |
| 153 | Bridport | 7-2 | Calne Town | 137 |
| 154 | Elmore | 1-4 | Ilfracombe Town | 74 |
| 155 | Wellington Town | 1-0 | Shortwood United | 50 |
| 156 | Bridgwater Town | 0-1 | Falmouth Town | 199 |
| 157 | Keynsham Town | 1-3 | Minehead Town | 101 |
| 158 | Tuffley Rovers | 0-1 | Truro City | 70 |
| 159 | Bishop Sutton | 0-1 | Dawlish Town | 56 |
| 160 | Fairford Town | 2-0 | Torrington | 54 |

Notes:

- † = After Extra Time

== First round ==
| Tie no | Home team | Score | Away team | Attendance |
|---|---|---|---|---|
| 1 | West Auckland Town | 1-0 | Bootle | 111 |
| 2 | Maine Road | 2-2† | Brodsworth Miners Welfare | 49 |
| replay | Brodsworth Miners Welfare | 1-3 | Maine Road | 127 |
| 3 | St Helens Town | 2–1 | Brigg Town | 131 |
| 4 | Curzon Ashton | 1–3 | Hallam | 65 |
| 5 | Poulton Victoria | 0-2 | Louth United | 105 |
| 6 | Liversedge | 4-2 | Rossendale United | 116 |
| 7 | Guisborough Town | 1–2 | Ossett Town | 166 |
| 8 | Chester-le-Street Town | 2–1 | Durham City | 202 |
| 9 | Washington | 1–6 | Prescot Cables | 52 |
| 10 | Warrington Town | 3–1† | Ossett Albion | 115 |
| 11 | Selby Town | 2–3 | Consett | 123 |
| 12 | Morpeth Town | 2–1 | Denaby United | 81 |
| 13 | Rossington Main | 2–5 | Goole A.F.C. | 220 |
| 14 | Seaham Red Star | 3–1 | West Allotment Celtic | 74 |
| 15 | Easington Colliery | 2–0 | Salford City | 33 |
| 16 | Atherton Laburnum Rovers | 1-5 | Billingham Synthonia | 100 |
| 17 | Darwen | 1-3 | Eccleshill United | 69 |
| 18 | Worsbrough Bridge Athletic | 1-4 | Garforth Town | 140 |
| 19 | Ramsbottom United | 4-1 | Woodley Sports | 190 |
| 20 | Brandon United | 5-1 | Harrogate Railway Athletic | 66 |
| 21 | Vauxhall Motors | 1–0 | South Shields | 73 |
| 22 | Arnold Town | 3-1 | Kirby Muxloe | 139 |
| 23 | West Midlands Police | 1-3 | Howell Sports | 81 |
| 24 | Stratford Town | 1-2 | Chasetown | 69 |
| 25 | Boldmere St. Michaels | 2-3 | Mickleover Sports | 95 |
| 26 | Rainworth Miners Welfare | 0-7 | Rushall Olympic | 105 |
| 27 | Gornal Athletic | 0-2 | Staveley Miners Welfare | 57 |
| 28 | Ibstock Welfare | 2-1 | Westfields | 106 |
| 29 | Stapenhill | 1-2 | St Andrews | 70 |
| 30 | Gedling Town | 0-3 | Kington Town | 58 |
| 31 | Rocester | 5-0 | Handrahan Timbers | 90 |
| 32 | Northampton Spencer | 2-4 | Nantwich Town | 42 |
| 33 | Pelsall Villa | 1-3 | Oldbury United | 86 |
| 34 | Heanor Town | 7–2 | Blackstone | 139 |
| 35 | Birstall United | 3-0 | Glossop North End | 124 |
| 36 | Bolehall Swifts | 2-0 | Ely City | 57 |
| 37 | Meir KA | 2-0 | Willenhall Town | 75 |
| 38 | Newcastle Town | 0-1 | Highfield Rangers | 85 |
| 39 | Redhill | 2-1 | Sheppey United | 122 |
| 40 | Welwyn Garden City | 1-3 | Windsor & Eton | 112 |
| 41 | Bowers United | 3–0 | Waltham Abbey | 45 |
| 42 | Newmarket Town | 2-2† | Barking | 154 |
| replay | Barking | 2-2† | Newmarket Town | 124 |
Newmarket Town advance 4–2 on penalties
| 43 | Ilford | 0-3 | Yaxley | 86 |
| 44 | Swaffham Town | 1-2 | Royston Town | 106 |
| 45 | Hungerford Town | 1-0 | Gosport Borough | 129 |
| 46 | Tunbridge Wells | 2-1 | Leighton Town | 102 |
| 47 | Barkingside | 1-0† | Croydon Athletic | 46 |
| 48 | Farnham Town | 0-1 | Letchworth | 123 |

| Tie no | Home team (tier) | Score | Away team (tier) | Attendance |
|---|---|---|---|---|
| 49 | Buckingham Town | 4-2 | Marlow | 116 |
| 50 | St Neots Town | 4-1 | Pagham | 110 |
| 51 | Lowestoft Town | 3-1 | Wellingborough Town | 238 |
| 52 | Canterbury City | 0-1 | Northwood | 74 |
| 53 | Tiptree United | 4-1 | Cowes Sports | 160 |
| 54 | Sidley United | 4-2 | Clapton | 207 |
| 55 | Basildon United | 3-0 | Beaconsfield SYCOB | 66 |
| 56 | Ware | 0-3 | Hassocks | 101 |
| 57 | Stowmarket Town | 6-1 | Littlehampton Town | 147 |
| 58 | Aveley | 2-1† | Whitstable Town | 128 |
| 59 | Farnham Town | 3-2 | Egham Town | 157 |
| 60 | Merstham | 1-5 | Deal Town | 91 |
| 61 | Saffron Walden Town | 1-0 | Chalfont St Peter | 230 |
| 62 | Buckingham Athletic | 3-2 | Islington St Mary's | 40 |
| 63 | Hornchurch | 0-1 | Cheshunt | 65 |
| 64 | Thetford Town | 3-2 | Corinthian Casuals | 130 |
| 65 | Diss Town | 1-0 | Edgware Town | 241 |
| 66 | Abingdon Town | 0-2 | North Leigh | 106 |
| 67 | Horsham YMCA | 1-0 | Ringmer | 100 |
| 68 | Ford United | 4-4† | Bedfont | 94 |
| replay | Bedfont | 0-1 | Ford United | 130 |
| 69 | Cobham | 6-2† | Peacehaven and Telscombe | 62 |
| 70 | Reading Town | 1-2 | Bicester Town | 46 |
| 71 | Thamesmead Town | 5-0 | Watton United | 55 |
| 72 | Cove | 0-6 | Camberley Town | 84 |
| 73 | Didcot Town | 0-3 | Harlow Town | 88 |
| 74 | Tilbury | 1-3 | Wick | 73 |
| 75 | Great Yarmouth Town | 0-2 | East Thurrock United | 149 |
| 76 | Mildenhall Town | 3-1 | Sandhurst Town | 132 |
| 77 | Chipstead | 3-2 | Arlesey Town | 70 |
| 78 | Thatcham Town | 4-0 | Chichester City | 124 |
| 79 | Eastleigh | 0-1 | Clacton Town | 114 |
| 80 | Stotfold | 1-0 | Ford Sports Daventry | 133 |
| 81 | Harpenden Town | 0-1 | Ramsgate | 84 |
| 82 | Epsom and Ewell | 1–1† | Stansted | 52 |
| replay | Stansted | 0-5 | Epsom and Ewell | 78 |
| 83 | Southwark | 2-4 | Ash United | 125 |
| 84 | Bedford Town | 3-1 | Eynesbury Rovers | 460 |
| 85 | Devizes Town | 0-1 | Brislington | 77 |
| 86 | Minehead Town | 2-1† | Falmouth Town | 233 |
| 87 | EFC Cheltenham | 1-2 | Barnstaple Town | 67 |
| 88 | Newquay | 2-0 | Brokenhurst | 124 |
| 89 | Fairford Town | 2-1 | Truro City | 86 |
| 90 | St Blazey | 1-0 | Mangotsfield United | 134 |
| 91 | Bideford | 2–3† | Wellington Town | 79 |
| 92 | Pershore Town | 0-2† | Ilfracombe Town | 97 |
| 93 | Dawlish Town | 3-1 | Bodmin Town | 119 |
| 94 | Bridport | 2-1 | Paulton Rovers | 129 |
| 95 | Melksham Town | 3-1 | Wimborne Town | 196 |
| 96 | Bemerton Heath Harlequins | 2–1 | Chippenham Town | 89 |

Notes:

- † = After Extra Time

== Second round ==
| Tie no | Home team | Score | Away team | Attendance |
|---|---|---|---|---|
| 1 | Ossett Town | 2–3 | Seaham Red Star | 157 |
| 2 | Garforth Town | 4-2† | Prescot Cables | 301 |
| 3 | Bedlington Terriers | 3-0 | Ramsbottom United | 200 |
| 4 | North Ferriby United | 0–1 | Workington | 236 |
| 5 | Billingham Synthonia | 2-5† | Tow Law Town | 220 |
| 6 | Clitheroe Town | 1-0† | West Auckland Town | 210 |
| 7 | Eccleshill United | 3-2 | Hallam | 69 |
| 8 | Dunston Federation Brewery | 2-1 | Maine Road | 122 |
| 9 | Vauxhall Motors | 4-2 | Easington Colliery | 72 |
| 10 | Mossley | 3-1 | Consett | 172 |
| 11 | St Helens Town | 2-2† | Morpeth Town | 167 |
| replay | Morpeth Town | 0-4 | St Helens Town | 81 |
| 12 | Brandon United | 3-1 | Liversedge | 63 |
| 13 | Billingham Town | 2-1† | Chester-le-Street Town | 78 |
| 14 | Warrington Town | 2-0 | Louth United | 104 |
| 15 | Heanor Town | 4-2† | Rushall Olympic | 173 |
| 16 | Mickleover Sports | 2-1 | Stotfold | 185 |
| 17 | Spalding United | 5-2 | Rochester | 302 |
| 18 | Birstall United | 0-1 | Oadby Town | 203 |
| 19 | Highfield Rangers | 3-1 | Howell Sports | 97 |
| 20 | Staveley Miners Welfare | 1-0 | Nantwich Town | 107 |
| 21 | Arnold Town | 3-4† | Wroxham | 195 |
| 22 | Chasetown | 1-0 | Histon | 111 |
| 23 | St Andrews | 3-2 | Buxton | 115 |
| 24 | Goole A.F.C. | 2-1 | Meir KA | 323 |
| 25 | Ibstock Welfare | 0-5 | Bedford Town | 324 |
| 26 | Kidsgrove Athletic | 5-3 | Bolehall Swifts | 150 |
| 27 | Kington Town | 4-5 | Oldbury United | 200 |
| 28 | Fakenham Town | 2-1 | Epsom & Ewell | 167 |
| 29 | Lowestoft Town | 1-3 | Tooting & Mitcham | 315 |
| 30 | Saffron Walden Town | 1-2 | Sudbury Town | 235 |
| 31 | Tunbridge Wells | 2-6 | Ash United | 124 |
| 32 | Abingdon Town | 0-1 | Letchworth | 60 |

| Tie no | Home team (tier) | Score | Away team (tier) | Attendance |
|---|---|---|---|---|
| 33 | Banstead Athletic | 2-1 | Hassocks | 101 |
| 34 | Thatcham Town | 1-3 | Ramsgate | 181 |
| 35 | Barkingside | 2-1 | Tiptree United | 58 |
| 36 | Harlow Town | 4-3† | Great Wakering Rovers | 189 |
| 37 | Woodbridge Town | 3-2 | Redhill | 115 |
| 38 | Mildenhall Town | 0-1 | Herne Bay | 203 |
| 39 | Thamesmead Town | 1-2 | Brache Sparta | 53 |
| 40 | Newmarket Town | 5-0 | Aveley | 123 |
| 41 | Northwood | 3-1 | Buckingham Athletic | 162 |
| 42 | Clackton Town | 3-1 | Buckingham Town | 260 |
| 43 | Burgess Hill Town | 2-2† | Camberley Town | 301 |
| replay | Camberley Town | 4-0 | Burgess Hill Town | 174 |
| 44 | Chipstead | 7-2 | Windsor & Eton | 96 |
| 45 | Thetford Town | 0-4 | Sudbury Wanderers | 130 |
| 46 | Horsham YMCA | 0-5 | Deal Town | 150 |
| 47 | Royston Town | 1-0† | North Leigh | 103 |
| 48 | Potters Bar Town | 0-1 | Ford United | 152 |
| 49 | Cobham | 5-2 | Stowmarket Town | 82 |
| 50 | Bowers United | 1-0 | Basildon United | 156 |
| 51 | Diss Town | 4-4† | Yaxley | 298 |
| replay | Yaxley | 1-3 | Diss Town | 153 |
| 52 | Wokingham Town | 0-1 | Sidley United | 143 |
| 53 | Cheshunt | 0-1 | Wick | 70 |
| 54 | East Thurrock United | 2–1† | St Neots Town | 112 |
| 55 | Bicester Town | 1-3† | Thame United | 162 |
| 56 | Bemerton Heath Harlequins | 3-0 | Swindon Supermarine | 80 |
| 57 | Newquay | 1-3 | Hungerford Town | 210 |
| 58 | Taunton Town | 4-0 | Bridport | 465 |
| 59 | Ilfracombe Town | 0-5 | Tiverton Town | 357 |
| 60 | Minehead Town | 0-2† | Melksham Town | 88 |
| 61 | Dawlish Town | 3-2 | Fairford Town | 71 |
| 62 | Lymington & New Milton | 1-0 | Wellington Town | 175 |
| 63 | Brislington | 3-3† | Porthleven | 161 |
| replay | Porthleven | 1-0 | Brislington | 265 |
| 64 | Barnstaple Town | 1-5 | St Blazey | 283 |

Notes:

- † = After Extra Time

== Third round ==
| Tie no | Home team (tier) | Score | Away team (tier) | Attendance |
|---|---|---|---|---|
| 1 | Highfield Rangers | 1–2 | Garforth Town | 102 |
| 2 | Staveley Miners Welfare | 0–2 | Dunston Federation Brewery | 141 |
| 3 | Mickleover Sports | 0–2 | Bedlington Terriers | 675 |
| 4 | St Helens Town | 3-1 | Eccleshill United | 104 |
| 5 | Brandon United | 2-3 | Goole A.F.C. | 114 |
| 6 | Warrington Town | 2-1† | Heanor Town | 124 |
| 7 | Mossley | 3–0 | St Andrews | 208 |
| 8 | Billingham Town | 0-2 | Clitheroe Town | 168 |
| 9 | Seaham Red Star | 0-2 | Vauxhall Motors | 90 |
| 10 | Workington | 1-1† | Tow Law Town | 1160 |
| replay | Tow Law Town | 3-4 | Workington | |
| 11 | Kidsgrove Athletic | 3-1 | Oadby Town | 184 |
| 12 | East Thurrock United | 3-4† | Harlow Town | 215 |
| 13 | Royston Town | 0-3 | Sudbury Town | 216 |
| 14 | Thame United | 2-1 | Letchworth | 121 |
| 15 | Sudbury Wanderers | 3-1 | Brache Sparta | 122 |
| 16 | Bowers United | 4-0 | Diss Town | 100 |

| Tie no | Home team (tier) | Score | Away team (tier) | Attendance |
|---|---|---|---|---|
| 17 | Barkingside | 1-7 | Oldbury United | 49 |
| 18 | Spalding United | 2-2† | Northwood | 432 |
| replay | Northwood | 2-1 | Spalding United | 178 |
| 19 | Fakenham Town | 1-4 | Bedford Town | 417 |
| 20 | Chasetown | 0-1 | Wroxham | 122 |
| 21 | Ford United | 4-3† | Newmarket Town | 141 |
| 22 | Woodbridge Town | 1-0 | Clackton Town | 143 |
| 23 | Melksham Town | 1-2 | Ash United | 241 |
| 24 | Herne Bay | 0-2† | Banstead Athletic | 174 |
| 25 | Taunton Town | 1-0 | Dawlish Town | 431 |
| 26 | Deal Town | 1-2 | Tiverton Town | 478 |
| 27 | St Blazey | 2-1 | Porthleven | 323 |
| 28 | Ramsgate | 0-3 | Bemerton Heath Harlequins | 177 |
| 29 | Lymington & New Milton | 4-0 | Hungerford Town | 182 |
| 30 | Chipstead | 2-2† | Tooting & Mitcham | 175 |
| replay | Tooting & Mitcham | 3-2 | Chipstead | 182 |
| 31 | Wick | 3-2 | Sidley United | 180 |
| 32 | Cobham | 1-2 | Camberley Town | 91 |

Notes:

- † = After Extra Time

== Fourth round ==
| Tie no | Home team | Score | Away team | Attendance |
|---|---|---|---|---|
| 1 | Ash United | 1–5 | Tiverton Town | 619 |
| 2 | Bedford Town | 3–1 | Wroxham | 848 |
| 3 | Bedlington Terriers | 7–3 | Banstead Athletic | 350 |
| 4 | Bowers United | 1-2† | Woodbridge Town | 151 |
| 5 | Camberley Town | 1-0† | Tooting & Mitcham | 237 |
| 6 | Clitheroe Town | 1–0 | St Helens Town | 360 |
| 7 | Ford United | 4–2 | Kidsgrove Athletic | 270 |
| 8 | Goole A.F.C. | 0–1 | Bemerton Heath Harlequins | 572 |

| Tie no | Home team | Score | Away team | Attendance |
|---|---|---|---|---|
| 9 | Harlow Town | 1–2 | Taunton Town | 801 |
| 10 | Lymington & New Milton | 1-0† | Mossley | 448 |
| 11 | Oldbury United | 0-4 | Workington | 319 |
| 12 | St Blazey | 1–5 | Dunston Federation Brewery | 384 |
| 13 | Sudbury Town | 0-1† | Northwood | 422 |
| 14 | Sudbury Wanderers | 2–0 | Garforth Town | 338 |
| 15 | Warrington Town | 0-2† | Thame United | 324 |
| 16 | Wick | 0–5 | Vauxhall Motors | 271 |

Notes:

- † = After Extra Time

== Fifth round ==
| Tie no | Home team | Score | Away team | Attendance |
|---|---|---|---|---|
| 1 | Bedford Town | 1–2 | Tiverton Town | 1,798 |
| 2 | Clitheroe Town | 1–0 | Bemerton Heath Harlequins | 510 |
| 3 | Dunston Federation Brewery | 1-4† | Lymington & New Milton | 470 |
| 4 | Ford United | 1–2 | Bedlington Terriers | 534 |

| Tie no | Home team | Score | Away team | Attendance |
|---|---|---|---|---|
| 5 | Taunton Town | 5–2 | Northwood | 1,139 |
| 6 | Thame United | 2-1† | Vauxhall Motors | 319 |
| 7 | Woodbridge Town | 2–1 | Camberley Town | 343 |
| 8 | Workington | 3-0† | Sudbury Wanderers | 1,308 |

Notes:

- † = After Extra Time

== Quarter-finals ==
| Tie no | Home team | Score | Away team | Attendance |
|---|---|---|---|---|
| 1 | Bedlington Terriers | 1-0† | Workington | 1,319 |
| 2 | Taunton Town | 3–1 | Lymington & New Milton | 1,608 |

| Tie no | Home team | Score | Away team | Attendance |
|---|---|---|---|---|
| 3 | Tiverton Town | 4–0 | Clitheroe | 1,473 |
| 4 | Woodbridge Town | 0-2† | Thame United | 1,051 |

Notes:

- † = After Extra Time

== Semi-finals ==
| Leg no | Home team | Score | Away team | Attendance |
|---|---|---|---|---|
| 1st | Taunton Town | 0–3 | Tiverton Town | 3,284 |
| 2nd | Tiverton Town | 2–1 | Taunton Town | 2,896 |

Tiverton Town won 5–1 on aggregate.

| Leg no | Home team (tier) | Score | Away team (tier) | Attendance |
|---|---|---|---|---|
| 1st | Bedlington Terriers | 5–0 | Thame United | 864 |
| 2nd | Thame United | 0–0 | Bedlington Terriers | 431 |

Bedlington Terriers won 5–0 on aggregate.

== Final ==
16 May 1999

| Bedlington Terriers | 0–1 | Tiverton Town |
|---|---|---|
| | | Scott Rogers 88' |

Wembley Stadium, London
Attendance: 13,878
Referee: W C Burns
