= 1996–97 Spartan League =

The 1996–97 Spartan League season was 79th and the last in the history of Spartan League.

At the end of the season the league was merged with South Midlands League to form Spartan South Midlands Football League. For the first season of the new league clubs from the South Midlands League and the Spartan League were separated: all the Spartan League Premier Division clubs formed Spartan South Midlands League Premier Division South, while clubs from Spartan League Division One and Division Two formed Spartan South Midlands League Division One South. Following first season of the new league regional Premier divisions and divisions One were merged.

== Premier Division ==
Spartan League Premier Division
- Season: 1996–97
- Champions: Barkingside
- Promoted: Croydon Athletic

The Premier Division featured 13 clubs which competed in the division last season, along with four new clubs:

- Harefield United, resigned from the Isthmian League
- Islington St Mary's, promoted from Division One
- Ruislip Manor, resigned from the Isthmian League
- Woodford Town, promoted from Division One

Also, Tufnell Park changed name to Haringey Borough.

=== League table ===
Pos	Team	Pld	W	D	L	GF	GA	GD	Pts	Promotion
1	Barkingside	30	20	6	4	60	23	+37	66	Joined SSML Premier Division South
2	Hillingdon Borough	30	19	8	3	65	31	+34	65	Joined SSML Premier Division South
3	Croydon Athletic	30	18	6	6	56	30	+26	60	Promoted to Isthmian League Division Three
4	St Margaretsbury	30	16	6	8	51	49	+2	54	Joined SSML Premier Division South
5	Beaconsfield SYCOB	30	13	10	7	52	28	+24	49	Joined SSML Premier Division South
6	Ruislip Manor	30	14	6	10	74	44	+30	48	Joined SSML Premier Division South
7	Woodford Town	30	13	6	11	42	39	+3	45	Joined SSML Premier Division South
8	Brimsdown Rovers	30	13	5	12	54	52	+2	44	Joined SSML Premier Division South
9	Islington St Mary's	30	9	10	11	38	38	0	37	Joined SSML Premier Division South
10	Waltham Abbey	30	11	4	15	39	45	−6	37	Joined SSML Premier Division South
11	Amersham Town	30	9	6	15	34	51	−17	33	Joined SSML Premier Division South
12	Hanwell Town	30	8	8	14	49	49	0	32	Joined SSML Premier Division South
13	Brook House	30	9	5	16	31	55	−24	32	Joined SSML Premier Division South
14	Cockfosters	30	6	6	18	35	57	−22	24	Joined SSML Premier Division South
15	Haringey Borough	30	5	6	19	24	58	−34	21	Joined SSML Premier Division South
16	Harefield United	30	5	6	19	32	87	−55	21	Joined SSML Premier Division South
17	Tottenham Omada	0	0	0	0	0	0	0	0	Club folded, record expunged

Source: nonleaguematters
Rules for classification: 1) points; 2) goal difference; 3) number of goals scored.

== Division One ==
Spartan League Division One
- Season: 1996–97
- Champions: Leyton County

Division One featured seven clubs which competed in the division last season, along with two new clubs, promoted from Division Two:

- AC Milla
- Classic Inter

Also, Walthamstow Trojan changed name to Trojan.

=== League table ===
Pos	Team	Pld	W	D	L	GF	GA	GD	Pts	Qualification
1	Leyton County	14	10	2	2	34	14	+20	32	Joined SSML Division One South
2	Catford Wanderers	14	9	1	4	33	16	+17	25 (Note: Catford Wanderers deducted 3 points.)	Did not join Spartan South Midlands League
3	Old Roan	14	7	4	3	28	19	+9	25	Joined SSML Division One South
4	Trojan	14	7	3	4	25	18	+7	24	Did not join Spartan South Midlands League
5	Craven	14	6	3	5	39	25	+14	21	Did not join Spartan South Midlands League
6	Cray Valley PM	14	4	3	7	25	35	−10	15	Joined SSML Division One South
7	Bridon Ropes	14	2	3	9	15	29	−14	9	Joined SSML Division One South
8	Classic Inter	14	1	1	12	18	61	−43	4	Joined SSML Division One South
9	AC Milla	0	0	0	0	0	0	0	0	Club folded, record expunged

Source: nonleaguematters
Rules for classification: 1) points; 2) goal difference; 3) number of goals scored.

== Division Two ==
Spartan League Division Two
- Season: 1996–97
- Champions: Odua United

Division Two featured six clubs which competed in the division last season, along with three new clubs:

- Doddinghurst
- Leyton Sports
- Odua United

=== League table ===
Pos	Team	Pld	W	D	L	GF	GA	GD	Pts	Qualification
1	Odua United	16	11	3	2	47	17	+30	36	Joined SSML Division One South
2	Holland Park	16	11	3	2	42	18	+24	36	Joined SSML Division One South
3	Clapham	16	10	4	2	44	21	+23	34	Did not join Spartan South Midlands League
4	Chingford United	16	7	1	8	42	29	+13	22	Joined SSML Division One South
5	Leyton Sports	16	5	4	7	31	32	−1	19	Did not join Spartan South Midlands League
6	Long Lane	16	4	4	8	28	45	−17	16	Joined SSML Division One South
7	Doddinghurst	16	4	3	9	25	45	−20	15	Joined SSML Division One South
8	Leyton County reserves	16	4	2	10	22	34	−12	14	Did not join Spartan South Midlands League
9	Crofton Albion	16	3	2	11	24	64	−40	11	Did not join Spartan South Midlands League

Source: nonleaguematters
Rules for classification: 1) points; 2) goal difference; 3) number of goals scored.
