= Mining League =

- Folded: 2011
- Country: England
- Divisions: 3
- Number of clubs: 45
- Feeder to: Cornwall Combination
- Last champions: Illogan Reserves

The Mining League (last sponsored by One and All Sports) was a football league competition based in Cornwall, England, UK, with three divisions. The winning team of the First Division could be promoted to the Cornwall Combination.

The league merged with the Falmouth & Helston League at the end of the 2010–11 season. Both leagues at the time of the merger had three divisions and had 45 teams. The new Trelawny League was introduced for the start of the 2011–12 season, once the Falmouth & Helston League celebrated its 50th anniversary.

== Events ==
In 2010 the league made the national news due to the performances of newly promoted Division One team Madron, who conceded 227 goals in their first 11 games of the season, including a 55–0 defeat to Illogan RBL Reserves. Madron finished the season with no points and a goal difference of –395.

== Recent champions ==
These are the divisional champions for the final seasons of the league:

=== Division One ===
- 2009–10: Illogan Reserves
- 2010–11: Illogan Reserves

=== Division Two ===
- 2009–10: Madron
- 2010–11: Carbis Bay United

=== Division Three ===
- 2008-09: Threemilestone Reserves
- 2009–10: Praze-an-Beeble
- 2010–11: Hayle IV
