= Mullion F.C. =

Association football club in England

Coordinates: 50°01′22.0″N 5°15′3.4″W

Mullion
- Full name: Mullion Football Club
- Nickname: The Seagulls
- Founded: 1912
- Ground: Clifden Park, Mullion
- League: St Piran League Premier Division West
- 2025–26: St Piran League Premier Division West, 5th of 14

Mullion Football Club is a football club based in Mullion, Cornwall. They are currently members of the St Piran League Premier Division West and play at Clifden Park.

== History ==
Mullion joined the Cornwall Combination in 1968–69, winning the league three times before joining the South Western Football League in 1992. They returned to the Combination three years later after three mid-table finishes. They won the league for a fourth time in 2014–15, and later joined the St Piran League on its formation in 2019. Runners-up in the West Division at the end of the league's first full season, Mullion were promoted to the South West Peninsula League, at Step 6 of the National League System, in 2022.

== Honours ==
- League
  - Cornwall Combination winners (4): 1985–86, 1990–91, 1991–92, 2014–15
  - Cornwall Combination runners-up (6)
  - St Piran League West Division runners-up (1): 2021–22
