= St Piran Football League =

Association football league in England

- Founded: 2019
- Country: England
- Divisions: 10
- Number of clubs: 139
- Level on pyramid: Level 11 (Premier Division (East); Premier Division (West))
- Promotion to: South West Peninsula League Premier Division West (Level 10)
- Domestic cup: League Cup
- Website: Fulltime

The St Piran Football League is an association football league in England. Its two Premier Divisions operate at level 11 of the English league system, and the league was established as part of the National League System restructure to provide a Cornish Step 7 competition and a feeder to the South West Peninsula League. Most member clubs are based in Cornwall, with a small number from neighbouring Devon.

Following the 2022–23 season, the league expanded by absorbing the East Cornwall League, the Cornwall Combination, the Duchy League and the Trelawny League. After originally operating with two divisions, the league structure currently consists of five East divisions and five West divisions.

== Member clubs 2026–27 ==
- (p) – promoted from last season
- (r) – relegated from last season
- (n) – new team
- (withdrew) – club has withdrawn during the course of the season

=== Premier East ===
- A.F.C. St Austell Reserves
- Altarnun
- Callington Town Reserves
- Foxhole Stars
- Gunnislake
- Kilkhampton
- Looe Town
- Millbrook Reserves
- Nanpean Rovers (p)
- Newquay Reserves (p)
- North Petherwin
- Polperro
- Saltash United Reserves
- St Blazey Reserves
- Sticker Reserves
- Torpoint Athletic Reserves

=== Premier West ===
- Camborne School of Mines (p)
- Dropship (p)
- Illogan RBL
- Ludgvan
- Mullion
- Pendeen Rovers
- Penryn Athletic
- Penzance Reserves (p)
- Perranwell
- Porthleven
- Redruth United
- St Agnes
- St Day (resigned from SWPL Premier Division West)
- St Just
- Troon (p)
- Wendron United Reserves

=== Division One East ===
- Bodmin Town (r)
- Boscastle
- Dobwalls Reserves
- Gerrans & St Mawes United (p)
- Launceston Reserves
- Lifton
- Liskeard Athletic Reserves
- Pensilva (withdrew)
- Saltash United 3rds
- St Dennis (p)
- St Newlyn East
- St Stephen
- St Teath
- Torpoint Athletic 3rds
- Tregony (p)
- Wadebridge Town Reserves (withdrew)

=== Division One West ===
- Falmouth United
- Frogpool & Cusgarne (p)
- Goonhavern Athletic (p)
- Holman SC
- Illogan RBL Reserves
- Lizard Argyle (p)
- Mawnan
- Newlyn Non-Athletico
- Perranporth (p)
- Porthleven Reserves
- Probus
- RNAS Culdrose
- St Buryan (p)
- Wendron United 3rds
- West Cornwall

=== Division Two East ===
- Biscovey
- Bude Town Reserves
- Calstock
- Gorran
- Lanreath
- Lostwithiel
- Mevagissey
- Newquay Development (p)
- Padstow United (p)
- Roche
- St Breward (r) (withdrew)
- St Dominick (r)
- Week St Mary

=== Division Two West ===
- Dropship Reserves (p)
- Falmouth DC
- Hayle Reserves (r)
- Holman SC Reserves (p)
- Lanner
- Mawgan (p)
- Mawnan Reserves
- Mullion Reserves (p)
- Pendeen Rovers Reserves
- Perranporth Reserves (p)
- Perranwell Reserves
- St Agnes Reserves
- St Just Reserves

=== Division Three East ===
- Bodmin Dragons (p)
- Boscastle Reserves
- Delabole United
- Indian Queens
- Kilkhampton Reserves
- Landrake (p)
- Looe Town Reserves
- North Petherwin Reserves
- St Columb Major (p)
- St Dennis Reserves (p)
- St Merryn
- St Neot (p)
- St Teath Reserves

=== Division Three West ===
- Chacewater
- Constantine (withdrew)
- Goonhavern Athletic Reserves (p)
- Helston Athletic Old Boys (p)
- Ludgvan Reserves (p)
- Newlyn Non-Athletico Reserves (p)
- Penryn Athletic Reserves
- RNAS Culdrose Reserves
- St Ives Mariners (r)
- St Keverne
- Stithians
- Tremough (p)
- Troon Reserves

=== Division Four East ===
- Bodmin Town Reserves (n)
- Brake Parc Wanderers (n)
- Gerrans & St Mawes United Reserves
- Grampound (resigned from D3E) (withdrew)
- Launceston Development (resigned from D3E)
- Lifton Reserves
- Lostwithiel Reserves (resigned from D3E)
- St Ann's Chapel (n)
- St Blazey 3rds (n)
- St Breward Wanderers (n) (withrdew)
- St Cleer
- St Mawgan Reserves (resigned from D2E)
- St Minver

=== Division Four West ===
- Carharrack (r)
- Dropship 3rds (withdrew)
- Falmouth Athletic
- Lizard Argyle Reserves
- Madron
- Redruth United Reserves (n)
- Speak Out United
- St Agnes 3rds (n)
- St Buryan Reserves (n)
- St Day Reserves (demoted from Premier West after St Day 1sts resigned from SWPL)
- Trelawny (n)
- Wendron United 4ths

== Champions ==
Season	East Division	West Division
2019–20	Season abandoned	
2020–21	Season abandoned	
2021–22	Saltash Borough	Illogan RBL
2022–23	Saltash Borough	Truro City Reserves

Season	Premier Division East	Premier Division West	Division One East	Division One West	Division Two East	Division Two West	Division Three East	Division Three West	Division Four East	Division Four West
2023–24	St Dominick	St Day	Foxhole Stars	Mawnan	Pensilva	New Inn Titans	Bude Town Reserves	Dropship	Tregony	Penryn Athletic Reserves
2024–25	Saltash United Reserves	Falmouth Town Reserves	Looe Town	Ludgvan	Dobwalls Reserves	Dropship	Tregony	Perranporth	Newquay 3rds	Holman SC Reserves
2025–26	Saltash United Reserves	Pendeen Rovers	Newquay Reserves	Dropship	Gerrans & St Mawes United	Perranporth	Newquay 3rds	Dropship Reserves	St Columb Major	Helston Athletic Old Boys
