= Dave Philp =

English footballer

Personal information
- Full name: David Philp
- Date of birth: 8 July 1960 (age 66)
- Place of birth: Newquay, Cornwall, England
- Position: Goalkeeper

Team information
- Current team: St Blazey (manager)

Senior career*
Years	Team	Apps	(Gls)
1977–1984	Newquay		
1984–1986	Plymouth Argyle	7	(0)
1986–1990	Saltash United		
1990–1996	Falmouth Town		
1996–1997	Wadebridge Town		
1997–2001	St Blazey		
2001–2003	Bodmin Town		
2003	Falmouth Town	8	(0)
2003–2004	Liskeard Athletic		
2004–2007	Newquay		

Managerial career
- –2007: Newquay
- 2007–2008: St Blazey
- * Club domestic league appearances and goals

David Philp (born 8 July 1960) is a former professional football goalkeeper. He was manager of Cornish side St Blazey until 2008.

Philp was born in Newquay and played for the local side, Newquay, before joining Plymouth Argyle in July 1984. He played seven league games for Argyle before returning to non-league football in 1986.

In December 2002, he became Bodmin Town's third manager in the space of five weeks. He stayed until being sacked in May 2003.

In May 2004 he was playing for Liskeard Athletic.

With injury ruling out Newquay's regular keeper, Philp made a return to playing action in February 2007.

Philp left Newquay in May 2007 and took over as manager of St Blazey the following month.
