= Kevin Parker (English footballer) =

English footballer

Personal information
- Full name: Kevin James Parker
- Date of birth: 10 September 1979 (age 47)
- Place of birth: Plymouth, England
- Position: Left winger

Youth career
- 1995–1999: Norwich City

Senior career*
Years	Team	Apps	(Gls)
1999–2000	Norwich City	0	(0)
2000–2001	Torquay United	17	(2)
2001–2002	Weymouth		
2002–200?	Weston-super-Mare		
2003	Bodmin Town		
2004	Saltash United		
2005–2006	Plymouth Parkway		(3)
2006 –	Tavistock		
- * Club domestic league appearances and goals

Kevin James Parker (born 10 September 1979) is an English former professional footballer who played as a left winger.

== Biography ==
Born in Plymouth, Parker began his career as a trainee with Norwich City, but was kept out of the game for 18 months due to suffering from ME. He turned professional in June 1999 and played 20 times for the reserves the following season, but was released by Norwich on 26 April 2000 without appearing in the first-team.

He joined Torquay United on trial and earned himself a one-year contract in July 2000. He made his league debut on 12 August 2000 against league newcomers Kidderminster Harriers. After a few promising games at the start of the season, he joined the ever-growing list of long-term injured players and was out for most of the remainder of the season. He did score an injury-time winner at Plainmoor against local rivals Exeter City in January 2001, but soon afterwards injured himself in training. In May 2001, Parker was given a three-month contract extension to prove his fitness and then prove his ability to the new manager Roy McFarland. He made only two further appearances for the Gulls (both times as a substitute in the games away to Kidderminster Harriers and Cheltenham Town) before joining Yeovil Town on a two-week trial on 17 September 2001. On 28 September 2001, Parker's contract with Torquay was cancelled by mutual consent. The following day he signed for Weymouth on non-contract terms, playing on a match-to-match basis until early November when he signed a contract until the end of the season.

In May 2002, with Weymouth in financial trouble, Parker, along with Weymouth teammate Ryan Cross, joined Weston-super-Mare.

In October 2003, Parker was playing for Bodmin Town and was the subject of a transfer request from Porthleven. In April 2004, he was playing for Saltash United.

In the 2005–06 season, he scored three times for Plymouth Parkway, but was playing for Tavistock the following season.
