= St Dennis A.F.C. =

Association football club in England

Coordinates: 50°23′02.0″N 4°53′25.9″W

St Dennis
- Full name: St Dennis Association Football Club
- Nickname: The Saints
- Founded: 1902
- Ground: Boscawen Park, St Dennis
- Chairman: Mikey Davies
- Manager: Jack Barbery
- League: St Piran League Division Two East
- 2024–25: St Piran League Division Two East, 6th of 10

St Dennis Association Football Club is a football club based in St Dennis, Cornwall. They are currently members of the St Piran League Division Two East and play at Boscawen Park.

== History ==
Founder members of the Cornwall Combination in 1959–60, St Dennis won the league in 1975–76, before dropping out in 1983. They resurfaced in the East Cornwall League and won it twice, in 1991–92 and 1999–2000. They resigned in 2006, but rejoined three years later, winning Division One and the Premier Division in two seasons before being promoted to the South West Peninsula League Division One West in 2011. At the end of 2018–19 the league was restructured, and St Dennis successfully applied for promotion to the Premier Division West, at Step 6 of the National League System.

== Honours ==
- Cornwall Combination
  - Champions 1975–76
- East Cornwall League
  - Champions 1991–92, 1999–2000, 2010–11
