= Reg Wyatt =

English footballer

Personal information
- Full name: Reginald Gordon Wyatt
- Date of birth: 18 September 1932
- Place of birth: Plymouth, England
- Date of death: 16 November 2007 (aged 75)
- Place of death: Plymouth, England
- Position: Centre back

Senior career*
Years	Team	Apps	(Gls)
1955–1964	Plymouth Argyle	201	(2)
1964–1967	Torquay United	80	(6)
1967–	Wadebridge Town		
Total		281	(8)
- * Club domestic league appearances and goals

Reginald Gordon "Reg" Wyatt (18 September 1932 – 16 November 2007) was an English footballer who played as a centre back.

He began his career with Oak Villa (now known as Vospers Oak Villa), a non-league (now the South West Peninsula League) club in Plymouth, while studying at the Astor Institute. He became a professional in 1950 when he signed for Plymouth Argyle, but had to wait five years before making his first team debut. Originally a forward, Wyatt forced his way into the team as a centre back and went on to be a regular name on the teamsheet for the next nine years. He spent three years with Torquay United between 1964 and 1967, before finishing his career in non-league football with Wadebridge Town.
