= Charlie Rundle =

English footballer

Personal information
- Full name: Charles Rodney Rundle
- Date of birth: 17 January 1923
- Place of birth: Fowey, England
- Date of death: 1997 (aged 73–74)
- Position: Inside forward

Senior career*
Years	Team	Apps	(Gls)
- St Blazey
1946–1950	Tottenham Hotspur	28	(12)
1950–1952	Crystal Palace	38	(2)
- Dartford
- * Club domestic league appearances and goals

Charles Rodney Rundle (17 January 1923 in Fowey – 1997) was an English professional footballer who played for St Blazey, Tottenham Hotspur, Crystal Palace and Dartford.

== Playing career ==
Rundle began his football career at non-League club St Blazey.

The inside forward joined Tottenham Hotspur in February 1946. Rundle scored on his debut in a 2-1 victory over Southampton at White Hart Lane in September 1946. He went on to score 12 goals in 29 senior matches in all competitions.

He transferred to Crystal Palace in June 1950 and featured in a further 38 games and found the net twice between 1950 and 1951.

After leaving Selhurst Park he ended his competitive career at Dartford.
