= 1997–98 Spartan South Midlands Football League =

The 1997–98 Spartan South Midlands Football League season was the first in the history of Spartan South Midlands Football League. The league was formed by the merger of the Spartan League and the South Midlands League.

The league consisted of 75 clubs divided into five divisions.

For this season only both Premier Division and Division One were split geographically into two sections, as the Premier Division North was a successor of the South Midlands League Premier Division, and the Premier Division South was a successor of the Spartan League Premier Division. Senior Division was a successor of the South Midlands League Senior Division. Division One North was a successor of the South Midlands League Division One, and the Division One South was a successor of the Spartan League divisions One and Two.

At the end of the season Premier divisions were merged, while Division One North was renamed Division One as all the Division One South clubs resigned from the league and formed the London Intermediate League.

== Premier Division North ==
Spartan South Midlands Football League Premier Division North
- Season: 1997–98
- Champions: Brache Sparta
- Relegated: Letchworth; Biggleswade Town; Milton Keynes; Bedford United; Langford
- Matches: 210
- Goals: 714 (3.4 per match)

The division featured 15 clubs, all came from the South Midlands League Premier Division.

=== League table ===
Pos	Team	Pld	W	D	L	GF	GA	GD	Pts	Qualification or relegation
1	Brache Sparta	28	23	2	3	75	17	+58	71	
2	Potters Bar Town	28	20	7	1	62	21	+41	67	
3	London Colney	28	16	4	8	67	46	+21	52	
4	Royston Town	28	14	5	9	52	34	+18	47	
5	Hoddesdon Town	28	15	2	11	50	36	+14	47	
6	Welwyn Garden City	28	12	10	6	47	42	+5	46	
7	Arlesey Town	28	13	5	10	51	41	+10	44	
8	Harpenden Town	28	12	5	11	46	45	+1	41	
9	Toddington Rovers	28	10	5	13	39	52	−13	35	
10	Buckingham Athletic	28	9	6	13	46	55	−9	33	
11	Letchworth	28	8	5	15	50	63	−13	29	Relegated to the Senior Division
12	Biggleswade Town	28	7	7	14	41	53	−12	28	Relegated to the Senior Division
13	Milton Keynes	28	8	5	15	40	52	−12	28 (Note: Milton Keynes were deducted 1 point.)	Relegated to the Senior Division
14	Bedford United	28	3	8	17	25	67	−42	14 (Note: Bedford United were deducted 3 points.)	Relegated to the Senior Division
15	Langford	28	1	2	25	23	90	−67	5	Relegated to the Senior Division

Source: fchd
Rules for classification: 1) points; 2) goal difference; 3) number of goals scored.

== Premier Division South ==
Spartan South Midlands Football League Premier Division South
- Season: 1997–98
- Champions: Brook House
- Relegated: Hanwell Town; Harefield United; Amersham Town; Cockfosters
- Matches: 210
- Goals: 714 (3.4 per match)

The division featured 15 clubs, all came from Spartan League Premier Division.

=== League table ===
Pos	Team	Pld	W	D	L	GF	GA	GD	Pts	Qualification or relegation
1	Brook House	28	18	6	4	66	27	+39	60	
2	Beaconsfield SYCOB	28	16	8	4	59	27	+32	56	
3	Ruislip Manor	28	17	4	7	61	29	+32	55	
4	Hillingdon Borough	28	15	7	6	73	35	+38	52	
5	Barkingside	28	12	7	9	44	34	+10	43	
6	Waltham Abbey	28	12	6	10	54	42	+12	42	
7	Haringey Borough	28	12	4	12	42	44	−2	40	
8	Brimsdown Rovers	28	11	4	13	46	58	−12	37	
9	St Margaretsbury	28	11	4	13	46	58	−12	36 (Note: St Margaretsbury were deducted 1 point.)	
10	Islington St Mary's	28	10	4	14	42	52	−10	33 (Note: Islington St Mary's were deducted 1 point.)	
11	Woodford Town	28	7	9	12	48	59	−11	30	Resigned from the league
12	Hanwell Town	28	8	4	16	45	76	−31	28	Relegated to the Senior Division
13	Harefield United	28	7	6	15	27	67	−40	27	Relegated to the Senior Division
14	Amersham Town	28	8	2	18	26	45	−19	26	Relegated to the Senior Division
15	Cockfosters	28	5	7	16	35	61	−26	22	Relegated to the Senior Division

Source: fchd
Rules for classification: 1) points; 2) goal difference; 3) number of goals scored.

== Senior Division ==
Spartan South Midlands Football League Senior Division
- Season: 1997–98
- Champions: New Bradwell St Peter
- Promoted: New Bradwell St Peter; Mercedes Benz
- Relegated: The 61 FC Luton; Kent Athletic; Ampthill Town
- Matches: 240
- Goals: 986 (4.11 per match)

The division featured 13 clubs which competed in the previous season South Midlands League Senior Division, along with three new clubs.

- Two clubs, promoted from South Midlands League Division One:
  - Biggleswade United
  - Caddington
- One club joined the Division:
  - Shillington, who last competed in the 1995–96 season in the South Midlands League

=== League table ===
Pos	Team	Pld	W	D	L	GF	GA	GD	Pts	Qualification or relegation
1	New Bradwell St Peter	30	21	5	4	86	30	+56	68	Promoted to the Premier Division
2	Tring Athletic	30	21	5	4	84	30	+54	68	
3	Mercedes Benz	30	21	2	7	84	51	+33	65	Promoted to the Premier Division
4	Holmer Green	30	20	3	7	94	41	+53	63	
5	Biggleswade United	30	16	8	6	74	40	+34	56	
6	Houghton Town	30	16	6	8	69	51	+18	54	
7	Leverstock Green	30	15	7	8	66	43	+23	52	
8	Caddington	30	15	4	11	57	61	−4	49	
9	Shillington	30	12	5	13	56	61	−5	41	
10	Risborough Rangers	30	8	9	13	50	65	−15	33	
11	Winslow United	30	10	2	18	55	78	−23	32	
12	Totternhoe	30	8	3	19	53	78	−25	27	
13	Stony Stratford Town	30	7	2	21	46	78	−32	23	
14	The 61 FC Luton	30	5	3	22	35	99	−64	18	Relegated to Division One
15	Kent Athletic	30	5	4	21	44	88	−44	16 (Note: Kent Athletic were deducted three points.)	Relegated to Division One
16	Ampthill Town	30	4	4	22	33	92	−59	16	Relegated to Division One

Source: fchd
Rules for classification: 1) points; 2) goal difference; 3) number of goals scored.

== Division One North ==
Spartan South Midlands Football League Division One North
- Season: 1997–98
- Champions: Luton Old Boys
- Promoted: Luton Old Boys; Greenacres
- Matches: 240
- Goals: 912 (3.8 per match)

The division featured 16 clubs which competed in the previous season South Midlands League Division One, along with one new club:

- Greenacres

=== League table ===
Pos	Team	Pld	W	D	L	GF	GA	GD	Pts	Qualification or relegation
1	Luton Old Boys	30	21	3	6	72	30	+42	66	Promoted to the Senior Division
2	Greenacres	30	19	8	3	71	27	+44	65	Promoted to the Senior Division
3	Pitstone & Ivinghoe	30	17	3	10	66	55	+11	54	
4	Crawley Green Sports	30	14	8	8	76	41	+35	50	Resigned from the league
5	De Havilland	30	14	8	8	60	51	+9	50	
6	Bridger Packaging	30	14	6	10	64	49	+15	48	
7	Bedford Eagles	30	15	5	10	60	42	+18	49 (Note: Bedford Eagles deducted one point.)	Resigned from the league
8	Leighton Athletic	30	13	3	14	69	66	+3	42	
9	Walden Rangers	30	12	6	12	60	61	−1	42	
10	Abbey National	30	10	8	12	44	57	−13	38	
11	Mursley United	30	10	7	13	48	63	−15	37	
12	Old Dunstablians	30	9	8	13	41	68	−27	35	
13	Scot	30	9	6	15	76	75	+1	33	
14	Old Bradwell United	30	7	4	19	44	82	−38	25	
15	Flamstead	30	5	9	16	32	60	−28	24	
16	Emberton	30	3	4	23	29	85	−56	12 (Note: Emberton deducted one point.)	Resigned from the league
17	Buckingham United	0	0	0	0	0	0	0	0	Club folded, record expunged

Source: fchd
Rules for classification: 1) points; 2) goal difference; 3) number of goals scored.

== Division One South ==
Spartan South Midlands Football League Division One South
- Season: 1997–98
- Champions: Old Roan
- Matches: 155
- Goals: 778 (5.02 per match)

The division featured ten clubs which competed in the previous season Spartan League divisions One and Two, along with five clubs:

- Crown & Manor
- Chestnut Trojans
- Leyton
- Leyton Youth
- Tottenham Omada

=== League table ===
Pos	Team	Pld	W	D	L	GF	GA	GD	Pts	Qualification or relegation
1	Old Roan	24	18	2	4	111	29	+82	56	All clubs left the league
2	Cray Valley P M	24	16	4	4	74	22	+52	52	All clubs left the league
3	Crown & Manor	24	16	3	5	74	22	+52	51	All clubs left the league
4	Leyton County	24	15	5	4	72	24	+48	47 (Note: Leyton County were deducted three points.)	All clubs left the league
5	Bridon Ropes	24	13	4	7	72	39	+33	43	All clubs left the league
6	Chestnut Trojans	23	11	6	6	66	42	+24	39 (Note: Remaining match was not played.)	All clubs left the league
7	Odua United	24	11	4	9	62	41	+21	37	All clubs left the league
8	Holland Park	24	9	5	10	57	61	−4	32	All clubs left the league
9	Long Lane	24	9	1	14	51	42	+9	28	All clubs left the league
10	Leyton	23	7	7	9	54	49	+5	28	All clubs left the league
11	Doddinghurst	24	4	2	18	34	97	−63	14	All clubs left the league
12	Leyton Youth	24	2	1	21	32	136	−104	7	All clubs left the league
13	Chingford Town	24	2	0	22	19	174	−155	6	All clubs left the league
14	Classic Inter	0	0	0	0	0	0	0	0	Clubs folded, records expunged
15	Tottenham Omada	0	0	0	0	0	0	0	0	Clubs folded, records expunged

Source: fchd
Rules for classification: 1) points; 2) goal difference; 3) number of goals scored.
