= Bude Town F.C. =

Coordinates: 50°49′48.65″N 4°32′7.4″W

Bude Town
- Full name: Bude Town Football Club
- Founded: 1901; 125 years ago
- Ground: Broadclose Park, Bude
- Capacity: 2,000
- Chairman: Mark Harfield
- Manager: Steve Hackett
- League: South West Peninsula League Premier Division West
- 2024–25: South West Peninsula League Premier Division West, 14th of 16
Home colours

Bude Town Football Club is a football club based in Bude, Cornwall, England. They are currently members of the South West Peninsula League Premier Division West and play at Broadclose Park, Bude. Bude Town's current manager & first team set up as of 2024 is Steve Hackett as manager, with Liam Dart as first team assistant manager & head coach. In the 2024/25 season Bude Town finished 14th in the South West Peninsula League with 26 points with 7 wins, 5 draws & 18 defeats. Callum Deemer was the clubs top scorer for the 2024/25 season with 8 league goals. For the 2025/26 season Bude Town will play in the South West Peninsula League for a fourth consecutive season. Bude Town's primary rivals are Holsworthy AFC, Camelford and Launceston FC, based on their local derby status and frequent matchups. Bude Town also have a reserves team who play in the Kernow Stone St Piran League division 2 east with Hayden White as manager and Jake Salt his assistant. They also have a veterans team managed by Paul Barlow who play in the Cornwall Veterans League D1. Until the 2022/23 Bude Town had a Ladies team who played Cornwall Ladies League but they decided to fold the team due to a lack of players. Bude have strong boys, girls and mixed youth team set up with over 15 teams spanning from under 7s to under 16s.

== History ==
Bude Town were formed in 1901. Prior to the 1990s, Bude joined the East Cornwall League, playing in the league until 2005, when they were relegated to the Duchy League. In 2006, the club was promoted back into the East Cornwall League. In 2013, Bude were promoted into the South West Peninsula League. In 2019, the club became founder members of the St Piran League. In 2022, the club was admitted into the South West Peninsula League Premier Division West.

== Ground ==
The club currently play at Broadclose Park, Bude, having played at the site since they were formed. In January 2023 Bude Town had floodlight's installed at Broadclose Park to help them get ground grading so they could stay and play in the South West Peninsula League Premier Division West.

== FA Vase ==
During the 2023/24 season Bude Town entered the FA Vase for the first time in their history, In the first qualifying round where they were drawn against Bishops Lydeard AFC away, beating them 3–0 with an attendance of 51, In the second qualifying round they was drawn against Devon side Okehampton Argyle FC this away also an away tie, Bude Town lost 3–0 in front of a crowd of 116. After a season out Bude Town will return to playing in the FA Vase for the 2025/26 season.

== Kits ==
For the 2024/25 season Bude Town's home kit was blue with blue shorts with local business A.S Excavations as sponsor. Bude Town's Away kit was Red with Red Shorts and another local business Rosie's Kitchen as sponsor. The clubs kit supplier is Macron. The kits and sponsors remain the same for the 2025/26 season.

== Honours ==
SWPL Premier Division Champions: 2007–08, 2008–09, 2011–12, 2012–13, 2015–16

SWPL Premier Runners-up: 2009–10, 2010–11, 2014–15

SWPL League Cup Winners: 2007–08, 2008–09, 2011–12, 2012–13, 2015–16

SWPL League Cup Runners-up: 2009–10

Charity Bowl Winners: 2012-13
