= Marcus Crocker =

English footballer

Personal information
- Full name: Marcus Alan Crocker
- Date of birth: 8 October 1974 (age 52)
- Place of birth: Plymouth, England
- Position: Forward

Youth career
- Plymouth Argyle

Senior career*
Years	Team	Apps	(Gls)
1992–1995	Plymouth Argyle	10	(0)
1995	→ Bath City (loan)	?	(2)
1995–??	Dorchester Town		
- St Blazey
- Plymouth Parkway
- Tavistock
20??–2006	Plymouth Parkway		
2006–2???	Newquay		
- * Club domestic league appearances and goals

Marcus Alan Crocker is an English former professional footballer.

== Career ==
He started as a youth player at Plymouth Argyle and progressed to the first team where he made his first senior start in the 1992–93 season. He made 10 league appearances for Plymouth, and his last senior game for them was on 26 December 1994 against Swansea City. He joined Bath City on a month's loan in January 1995, scoring in his first three games for the club. He was released by Plymouth at the end of the 1994–95 season and joined Dorchester Town, later playing for St Blazey and Plymouth Parkway.

In April 2000 Crocker was playing for Tavistock.

By October 2001 he had rejoined Plymouth Parkway, from where he joined Newquay in December 2006.
