= Billy Fellowes =

English footballer

Personal information
- Full name: William James Fellowes
- Date of birth: 15 March 1910
- Place of birth: Bradford, England
- Date of death: 1987 (aged 76–77)
- Height: 5 ft 9 1/2 in (1.77 m)
- Position: Half back

Senior career*
Years	Team	Apps	(Gls)
- Tavistock Town
1929–1933	Plymouth Argyle	5	(0)
1933–1935	Clapton Orient	78	(1)
1935–1937	Luton Town	110	(3)
1938–1946	Exeter City	59	(1)
–	Tavistock Town		
- * Club domestic league appearances and goals

William James Fellowes (15 March 1910 – 1987) was an English footballer who played as a half back in the Football League for Plymouth Argyle, Clapton Orient, Luton Town and Exeter City. He was born in Bradford.
