= Falmouth and Helston League =

- Founded: 1960
- Folded: 2011
- Country: England
- Divisions: 3
- Number of clubs: 45
- Feeder to: Cornwall Combination
- Last champions: Falmouth Athletic DC

The Falmouth and Helston League was an English association football league comprising clubs from South Cornwall. The league was formed following the amalgamation of the Falmouth and District Football League and the Helston and District Football League in 1960–61. In those days it consisted of just two divisions until expanded to three divisions in 1998–99. The top division plays at the 13th overall tier of the English football league system. One team from Division One could be promoted into the Cornwall Combination providing they finished in the top three and satisfied ground grading requirements.

The league merged with the Mining Division Football League for the 2011–12 season. Both leagues at the time of the merger had three divisions composed of a similar number of teams. The new Trelawny League was introduced for the 2011–12 season, once the Falmouth and Helston League had celebrated its 50th anniversary.

== Recent Divisional Champions ==
=== Division One ===
2010-11 Champions: Falmouth Athletic DC
2009-10 Champions: Pendeen Rovers
2008-09 Champions: Mawnan
2007-08 Champions: Chacewater
2006-07 Champions: Porthleven Reserves
2005-06 Champions: St. Day

=== Division Two ===
2010-11 Champions: St Day Reserves
2009-10 Champions: Perranporth Reserves
2008-09 Champions: Constantine
2007-08 Champions: Pendeen Rovers
2006-07 Champions: Falmouth Town III
2005-06 Champions: Mawnan Reserves

=== Division Three ===
2010-11 Champions: Falmouth Athletic DC Reserves
2009-10 Champions: Lanner
2008-09 Champions: Trispen Reserves
2007-08 Champions: Porthleven Rangers
2006-07 Champions: RNAS Culdrose Reserves
2005-06 Champions: St. Day Reserves
