= David Pook =

English footballer

Personal information
- Full name: David Charles Pook
- Date of birth: 16 January 1955 (age 71)
- Place of birth: Plymouth, England
- Position: Winger

Youth career
- –1972: Bristol City
- 1972–1973: Torquay United

Senior career*
Years	Team	Apps	(Gls)
1972–1973	Torquay United	16	(1)
1973	Plymouth Argyle	0	(0)
- SC Morlaix
- * Club domestic league appearances and goals

David Charles Pook (born 16 January 1955) is an English former professional footballer. He was manager of Western League club Torrington until June 2007.

Pook was born in Plymouth and began his career as an apprentice with Bristol City. He moved to Torquay United during his apprenticeship and made his league debut while still an apprentice, as a substitute in the 1–1 draw at home to Bolton Wanderers on the final day of the 1971–72 season which by that time had already seen Torquay relegated to the Fourth Division.

Pook played a number of times for Torquay before turning professional in January 1973, but left at the end of the season to join Plymouth Argyle. However, he left Argyle after just three months due to a serious injury.

After six months out of the game, Pook moved to France to play for Morlaix where he spent two years before returning to England.

Pook subsequently played and coached at non-league level in Devon and Cornwall, including spells with St Blazey, Launceston, Ottery St Mary and Buckfastleigh Rangers.

He later became youth coach at Torquay United and was subsequently in the same role at Plymouth Argyle.

In March 2007, Pook was named as Robbie Herrera's replacement as manager of Torrington. He successfully guided Torrington to safety from relegation, but resigned in June 2007.

Pook is currently the chairman of Plymouth youth football side Elm United FC, where he oversees club operations and assists in coaching duties.

Preceded by Robbie Herrera	Torrington Manager; 2007–present	Succeeded by ?
