= Graham Killoughery =

English-born Irish footballer and dancer

Personal information
- Full name: Graham Anthony Killoughery
- Date of birth: 22 July 1984 (age 42)
- Place of birth: London, England
- Height: 5 ft 9 in (1.75 m)
- Position: Left winger

Youth career
- 2001–2003: Torquay United

Senior career*
Years	Team	Apps	(Gls)
2003	Torquay United	6	(0)
- * Club domestic league appearances and goals

Graham Anthony Killoughery (born 22 July 1984 in London) is an Irish former professional footballer and is currently a professional dancer.

== Football career ==
Killoughery, a left winger, joined Torquay United as a trainee on 1 July 2001, having been spotted by Torquay youth coach Richard Hancox playing, alongside another future trainee Biju Kironde, for Lewisham against Exeter City in an FA Youth Cup match.

His league debut came while still a trainee, on 29 March 2003 when came on as a late replacement for Simon Clist in the 1–1 draw at home to Boston United. He made a further appearance as a substitute against Southend United the following month and two days later started the 2–2 home draw with Leyton Orient.

In the 2003 close season, Killoughery, along with four other trainees (Kain Bond, Lucas Burgess, Ben Camara and Steven Orchard) signed professional with Torquay. He started the following season as a squad member, appearing as a substitute in the defeats at home to Rochdale and away to Scunthorpe United in August 2003 and in the draw at home to Darlington the following month. His final first team appearance came on 14 October 2003 when he was a second-half substitute for Jason Fowler in the Football League Trophy defeat away to Peterborough United. He was released by Torquay manager Leroy Rosenior at the end of October 2003.

== Dancing career ==
He subsequently became a professional dancer, appearing in Lord of the Dance.

== Personal life ==
Killoughery has a younger brother, Iain and two elder sisters, Michelle and Shona, who is also a professional Irish dancer and was a lead dancer in the Lord of the Dance.
