= Derek Bellotti =

English footballer (1946–2026)

Personal information
- Full name: Derek Christopher Bellotti
- Date of birth: 25 December 1946
- Place of birth: East Ham, London, England
- Date of death: 10 March 2026 (aged 79)
- Position: Goalkeeper

Youth career
- Queens Park Rangers
- Bedford Town

Senior career*
Years	Team	Apps	(Gls)
1966–1971	Gillingham	35	(0)
1970–1971	→ Southend United (loan)	3	(0)
1971–1972	Charlton Athletic	14	(0)
1972–1974	Southend United	74	(0)
1974–1975	Swansea City	19	(0)
1975–1978	Maidstone United		
1978	→ Margate (loan)		
1978–1979	St Blazey		
1979–1982	Torquay United	0	(0)
1982–1983	Falmouth Town		
1983–?	Bideford AFC		
- Saltash United
?–1988	Newquay		
1988–?	Torrington		
1997	Ilfracombe Town		
Total		145	(0)
- * Club domestic league appearances and goals

Derek Christopher Bellotti (25 December 1946 – 10 March 2026) was an English professional footballer who played as a goalkeeper.

== Career ==
Derek Bellotti began his career as an apprentice with Queens Park Rangers in September 1963. He turned professional and spent two seasons on loan to Bedford Town before being released at end of the 1965–66 season without making his debut for QPR.

He joined Gillingham in July 1966 and went on to make 35 league appearances for the Gills. In October 1970, he joined Southend United on loan, playing three games, and later that month was transferred to Charlton Athletic for a fee of £5,000. He played 14 league games for Charlton before moving to Southend United again in December 1971, this time on a permanent basis. He was Southend's regular 'keeper, staying at Roots Hall until May 1974 when he joined Swansea City after playing 74 league games for Southend.

Bellotti only stayed at the Vetch Field for one season, playing 19 times in the league, before moving back into non-league football with Maidstone United, spending two months on loan at Margate from January 1978. Later that year, his career outside football took him to live in Abbotskerswell, Devon and he signed for Cornish non-league side St Blazey from where he signed for Torquay United in October 1979 as cover for John Turner and later for Vince O'Keefe. When Torquay scrapped their reserve team in 1982, he left without making a league appearance, joining Falmouth Town. He subsequently played for Bideford, Saltash United, Newquay, and Torrington.

In December 1997, at the age of 50, he played for Ilfracombe Town as a temporary replacement for regular 'Combe goalkeeper, his son Ross, who was also a professional with Exeter City.

After retirement from football, Bellotti served as managing director of Kingfisher Print and Design, a print firm based in Dartington.

== Death ==
Bellotti died on 10 March 2026, at the age of 79.
