= Ben Camara =

English footballer (born 1984)

Personal information
- Full name: Ben Ibrahim Camara
- Date of birth: 20 August 1984 (age 42)
- Place of birth: Bonn, West Germany
- Height: 6 ft 2 in (1.88 m)
- Position: Forward

Youth career
- 1998–2001: Tavistock Town
- 2001–2003: Torquay United

Senior career*
Years	Team	Apps	(Gls)
2003–2004	Torquay United	2	(0)
2004	Stevenage Borough	1	(0)
2004–2005	Taunton Town	2	(0)
2005	Clevedon Town	4	(0)
2005	Taunton Town	5	(0)
2005	Torrington	3	(0)
2005–2007	Tavistock	6	(0)
2007–2008	Royal Racing Montegnée	23	(14)
2010–2012	Guildford City	83	(36)
Total		129	(50)
- * Club domestic league appearances and goals

Ben Ibrahim Camara (born 20 August 1984 in Bonn) is an English former professional footballer who played in the Football League for Torquay United.

== Biography ==
Camara was born in the West German city of Bonn and grew up in Plymouth. He joined Torquay United's Centre of Excellence whilst at school in Tavistock and continued to play for Tavistock Town. He signed as a trainee on 1 July 2001 and made his league debut on 15 March 2003, coming on a substitute in a 1–1 draw at home to Scunthorpe United. He made a further substitute appearance on 3 May 2003, in a 1–1 away to Lincoln City and was awarded young player of the year and a professional contract that summer (along with fellow trainees Kain Bond, Lucas Burgess, Graham Killoughery and Steven Orchard). However, he was released by Torquay manager Leroy Rosenior in January 2004 without adding to his first team appearances and joined Stevenage Borough. He made just one appearance, as a substitute, for Boro (on 14 February 2004 away to Leigh RMI).

Camara joined Taunton Town in the summer of 2004, moving to Clevedon Town in January 2005. He returned to Taunton in July 2005, but moved to Torrington in December 2005, playing under former Torquay defender Robbie Herrera and alongside former Torquay colleagues Dean Stevens and Nick Skinner. In August 2007 Camara signed with RRFC Montegnée and retired there in June 2008.

Camara resumed his football career in 2010 with Guildford City, who played at that time in the Combined Counties Premier League. He made his debut on 8 September 2010 in a 3–1 victory over Camberley Town and scored his first goal 6 days later in City's 5–1 defeat of Epsom and Ewell. Winning goal of the season two seasons running his goals contributed to Guildford City's successive first-place finishes in 2010/11 and 2011/12 and the club's subsequent promotion to Southern League Division One Central. Camara's final appearance for Guildford came in a 4–3 victory over Hayes on 4 September 2012.

Since 2008 Camara has gone onto become a serial entrepreneur in London co-founding The No1 Fitness Group, AWOL Media and now sitting as a director for Edufit. No1 Fitness studio centres. He is also the youngest founding member of the newest City Guild, The Guild of Entrepreneurs.
