= John Brown (footballer, born July 1940) =

English footballer

Personal information
- Date of birth: 29 July 1940 (age 86)
- Place of birth: Wadebridge, England
- Position: Inside forward

Youth career
- Probus School

Senior career*
| Years | Team | Apps | (Gls) |
| 1958–1960 | Wadebridge Town | | |
| 1960–1963 | Plymouth Argyle | 9 | (2) |
| 1963–1968 | Bristol Rovers | 156 | (32) |
| 1968–1969 | Wadebridge Town | | |

Managerial career
- 1968–1969: Wadebridge Town
- * Club domestic league appearances and goals

John Brown (born 29 July 1940) is a former professional footballer who played in The Football League for Plymouth Argyle and Bristol Rovers.

Brown, who was born in Wadebridge in Cornwall started playing for his home town team, Wadebridge Town in 1958. Following an unsuccessful trial for Arsenal in 1960 he joined Plymouth Argyle, but only featured nine times for their first team in his three years with the club, scoring twice.

On moving to Bristol Rovers in 1963 he made more of an impact, playing as an inside forward he made 156 appearances in the League and scored 32 goals. While playing in Bristol he decided to become a part-time player so that he could also work on his father's farm near Wadebridge, leading to him earning the nickname 'Farmer Brown', but he found the work and travelling difficult and in 1968 requested that his footballing contract was terminated. Rovers agreed, and after a single season as player-manager of his old team Wadebridge Town he retired from football altogether to become a full-time farmer. He later owned his own farm near Bodmin.
