= Islington St Mary's F.C. =

Islington St Mary's
- Full name: Islington St Mary's Football Club
- Founded: 1978
- Dissolved: 1999
- Ground: Coles Park, Tottenham
- Capacity: 2,500 (280 seated)
- Chairman: Ian Mylam
- Manager: Nick Adams & Samson Olaleye
- Final season; 1998–99: Spartan South Midlands League Premier Division, 17th of 23
Home colours

Islington St Mary's Football Club was a football club based in North London, England.

== History ==
Originally founded in 1978 as a youth team, the club won numerous local cups in the late 1980s and early 1990s, including the Manchester International Tournament. A 14-year-old, Adebayo "Bayo" Akinfenwa, led the team to glory. In the FIFA game, he would later be known as "the beast" with more than 1 million followers on social media. He played for numerous teams including Swansea FC and Wycomb Wanderers, but his most famous moment is when he scored for Wimbledon against Liverpool in the FA Cup. He was following in the footsteps of players that went before him, including Andrew Clark (who also scored for Wimbledon against Liverpool), Gifton Noel Williams (Watford and England Under-21s) and Shaun Wright-Phillips (Manchester City, Chealsea, and England).

In 12 years, the club won more than 20 major tournaments. Highlights include becoming the Islington Midweek Premier Champions in 1992, 1993 and 1994. The club again created history by winning the London Junior Cup in 1994, 1995 and 1996. The team also won the Spartan Intermediate Cup (as W. Trojans) in 1991. But the most memorable moment was in 1994 when the club played at Wembley Stadium in the final of the Brent cup versus the Spartan champions, Hawkeye, with medals presented by Ian Wright.

In 1993, under the name of Walthamstow St Mary's, following a merger with Walthamstow Trojans in 1991, the club joined the Spartan League Division Two. In 1995, following promotion to Division One, the club changed name to Islington St Mary's. In 1996, Islington St Mary's won promotion to the Spartan League Premier Division. In 1997–98, the club was placed into the Spartan South Midlands League Premier Division South, following a merger between the Spartan League and the South Midlands League. The club's final season in senior football came in the 1998–99 season, entering the FA Vase for the first time.

== Ground ==
Upon the dissolving of the club, the club played at Coles Park in Tottenham.

== Records ==
- Best FA Vase performance: First round, 1998–99
