= Trelawny League =

- Founded: 2011
- Folded: 2023
- Country: England
- Divisions: 5
- Number of clubs: 53
- Feeder to: Cornwall Combination
- Website: FA Fulltime

The Trelawny League was an English association football league comprising clubs from West Cornwall, formed from a merger between the Mining League and the Falmouth & Helston League at the end of the 2010–11 season. The new Trelawny League commenced in the 2011–12 season after the Falmouth and Helston League celebrated its 50th anniversary.

The league originally consisted of seven divisions, but was reduced to six for the 2012–13 season, reduced to five for the 2016–17 season, and further reduced to four for the 2019–20 season after the creation of the St Piran League. Up to two teams from the Premier Division could be promoted to the Cornwall Combination providing they finished in the top three and satisfied ground grading requirements.

Following the 2022–23 season, the league was absorbed into the St Piran League.

== Member clubs 2022–23 ==
=== Premier Division ===
- Camborne School of Mines
- Frogpool & Cusgarne
- Illogan Royal British Legion Reserves
- Ludgvan Reserves
- Mawnan Reserves
- Redruth United Reserves
- Stithians
- Threemilestone
- Troon
- West Cornwall

=== Division One ===
- Chacewater
- Constantine
- Falmouth United
- New Inn Titans
- Newlyn Non-Athletico
- Penzance Reserves
- Perranwell Reserves
- Rosudgeon Reserves
- St Buryan
- St. Day 3rds

=== Division Two ===
- Carharrack
- Falmouth DC
- Goonhavern Athletic Reserves
- Holman SC
- Probus
- RNAS Culdrose Reserves
- St. Erme
- St Ives Town Reserves
- Threemilestone Reserves*
- Tregony
- Wendron United 4ths

=== Division Three ===
- Constantine Reserves
- Dropship
- Falmouth United Reserves*
- Frogpool & Cusgarne Reserves
- Lanner
- Lizard Argyle Reserves
- Mount Ambrose
- St. Agnes 3rds
- St Ives Mariners
- St Keverne
- Troon Reserves

=== Division Four ===
- Dropship Reserves
- Helston Raiders
- Mullion 3rds
- Pendeen Rovers Reserves
- Penryn Athletic Reserves
- Perranporth Reserves*
- Praze-an-Beeble Reserves
- Ruan Minor
- St Just Reserves
- Storm
- Wendron United 5ths

* Club withdrew during the season

== Champions ==
Season	Premier	One	Two	Three	Four	Five	Six
2011–12	Goonhavern Athletic	Constantine	Helston Athletic Reserves	Falmouth Athletic DC Reserves	Wendron United 3rds	West Cornwall	Four Lanes
2012–13	Illogan RBL Reserves	Helston Athletic Reserves	Titans	St Buryan Reserves	Hayle 3rds	Marazion Blues Reserves	
2013–14	Illogan RBL Reserves	West Cornwall	Hayle Reserves	Chacewater Reserves	Camborne Park	Falmouth Town 3rds	
2014–15	Carharrack	Lizard Argyle	Penryn Athletic Reserves	Camborne Park	Mabe	Newlyn Lions	
2015–16	Lizard Argyle	Penryn Athletic Reserves	Marazion Blues	Penwith Exiles	Probus	New Inn Titans	
2016–17	Camborne School of Mines	Helston Athletic 3rds	Penwith Exiles	Probus	New Inn Titans		
2017–18	Mawnan	Mousehole Reserves	Newlyn Lions	Frogpool & Cusgarne Reserves	Praze-an-Beeble		
2018–19	Penwith Exiles	Threemilestone	Ruan Minor	Praze	Threemilestone Reserves		
2019–20	Season abandoned						
2020–21	Season abandoned						
2021–22	St Just	Illogan RBL Reserves	New Inn Titans	Probus	Falmouth United Reserves		
2022–23	Troon	New Inn Titans	Falmouth DC	Dropship	Pendeen Rovers Reserves		
