= Sticker A.F.C. =

Association football club in England

Coordinates: 50°19′23.8″N 4°50′50.3″W

Sticker
- Full name: Sticker Association Football Club
- Ground: Burngullow Lane, Sticker
- League: South West Peninsula League Premier Division West
- 2025–26: South West Peninsula League Premier Division West, 9th of 15
Home colours	Away colours

Sticker Association Football Club is a football club based in Sticker, Cornwall. They are currently members of the South West Peninsula League Premier Division West.

== History ==
The first time a club represented the village of Sticker was in 1911, who played until 1914 when World War I started. After the War the club reformed in 1920 and joined the St. Austell & District League until 1929 when the club folded again. The club reformed again in 1933 and played in the St. Austell & District League until the start of World War II in 1939. The club formed after the war in 1948 joining the Truro and District League, but again folded a few years afterwards at the end of the 1951–52 season.

1966 saw the present incarnation of the club form and 3 years later went on to get their first silverware with a treble of the Division 2 Duchy League title and two cups. The club played joined the Cornwall Combination in the 1970–71 season, but they only stayed for three seasons. They then moved to the East Cornwall League (ECL) winning the ECL title twice – in 1982 and 1986 – and after finishing as runners-up in 2012 they moved up to the South West Peninsula League (SWPL). They initially competed in the SWPL Division One West, but in 2017 they were promoted as champions to the Premier Division, at Step 6 of the National League System.

== Ground ==
The club play at Burngullow Lane. In 2017 the club with help from the Football Stadia Improvement Fund installed floodlights at the ground.

== Honours ==
=== League honours ===
- South West Peninsula League Division One West
  - Winners (1) 2016–17
- East Cornwall League
  - Winners (2) 1981–82, 1985–86
- Duchy League Division Two
  - Winners (1) 1969–70

=== Cup honours ===
- East Cornwall League Cup
  - Winners (1) 2011–12
- Cornwall Combination League Cup
  - Winners (1) 1972–73
- Duchy League Knock-out cup
  - Winners (1) 1969–70
- Duchy League cup
  - Winners (1) 1969–70
- George Evely Cup
  - Winners (2) 1981–82, 2011–12
- Durning Lawrence Charity Cup
  - Winners (2) 2012–13, 2016–17

== Records ==
- FA Vase
  - Second Qualifying Round 2026–27
