= Duchy League =

- Founded: 1965
- Folded: 2023
- Country: England
- Divisions: 3
- Number of clubs: 40
- Feeder to: East Cornwall League
- Website: https://fulltime.thefa.com/index.html?league=5695325

The Duchy League was an English football competition based in the eastern half of Cornwall, but also included a few sides from over the border in Devon. The League was formed in 1965 as a merger of the Liskeard & District League and the St. Austell & District League. It had three divisions headed by the Duchy League Premier Division, which was a feeder to the East Cornwall League. In 2014–15, Padstow United won the Premier Division, and earned promotion to the East Cornwall League.

== Cup competitions ==
For the 2015–16 season, the Duchy League ran three cup competitions: the KMD Developments Cup; Bodmin Sports Trophies Duchy League Cup and the TJ International Reserve Team Cup. The KMD Developments Cup had the top 32 teams from the previous seasons league positions take part in a knockout cup competition, with the semi-finals and final played on neutral grounds. The Bodmin Sports Trophies Duchy League Cup featured the rest of the teams competing in a similar knockout competition, whilst the TJ International Reserve Team Cup was a competition for clubs who have a second team in the Duchy Leagues. In 2014–15, St. Stephen of the Premier Division won the KMD Developments Cup; Veryan won the Bodmin Sports Trophies Duchy League Cup (as well as winning Division Three) and the Reserve Cup was won by Grampound Reserves.

Following the 2022–23 season, the league was absorbed into the St Piran League.

== Member clubs 2022–23 ==
=== Premier Division ===
- Bodmin Town Reserves
- Boscastle
- Dobwalls Reserves
- Gorran
- Lanivet Inn
- Lifton
- Lostwithiel
- Mevagissey
- Polzeath
- St Breward
- St Dominick Reserves
- St Merryn
- Saltash United 3rds
- Southgate Seniors

=== Division One ===
- Biscovey
- Boscastle Reserves
- Calstock
- Foxhole Stars Reserves
- Gerrans & St Mawes United
- Gunnislake Reserves
- Holywell & Cubert
- Looe Town Reserves
- North Petherwin Reserves
- Pensilva
- St Cleer
- St Mawgan Reserves
- St Minver Reserves

=== Division Two ===
- Bodmin Dragons
- Bude Town Reserves
- Castle Loyale
- Delabole & Tintagel
- Godolphin Atlantic (Newquay) Reserves*
- Grampound
- Indian Queens
- Lanreath
- Lifton Reserves
- Lostwithiel Reserves
- North Hill
- St Eval Spitfires
- Week St Mary

* Club resigned from the league during the season.

== Recent divisional champions ==
Season	Premier	One	Two	Three	Four	Five
2003–04	Biscovey	St Austell Reserves	Nanpean Rovers Reserves	Dobwalls Reserves	Edgcumbe	Looe Town
2004–05	Polperro	Lanreath	Lamerton	Edgcumbe	St Mawgan Reserves	Holywell Bay/Cubert Athletic
2005–06	St Columb Major	Lamerton	Edgcumbe	Lanivet	Holywell Bay/Cubert Athletic	Week St Mary
2006–07	Bere Alston United	St Stephen's Borough	Looe Town	Holywell Bay/Cubert Athletic	Lostwithiel	Stratton United
2007–08	St Stephen's Borough	Looe Town	St Cleer Reserves	Bodmin Saints	Gorran	St Austell Reserves
2008–09	Edgcumbe	St Cleer	Bodmin Saints	Looe Reserves	St Austell Reserves	Perranporth Reserves
2009–10	St Teath Reserves	Altarnun	St Newlyn East	St Austell Reserves	Gerrans	Charlestown Saints
2010–11	Torpoint Athletic 3rds	Calstock	St Austell Reserves	Sticker Reserves	North Petherwin	LC Phoenix
2011–12	Fowey United	St Austell Reserves	Biscovey	North Petherwin	LC Phoenix	St Cleer Reserves
2012–13	St Austell Reserves	Pensilva	Padstow United	St Minver	North Hill	Veryan
2013–14	Pensilva	St Dominick Reserves	Foxhole Stars Reserves	Callington Town 3rds	Veryan	St Merryn
2014–15	Padstow United	Foxhole Stars	Callington Town 3rds	Veryan	Mevagissey Reserves	Kilkhampton
2015–16	Looe Town	Callington Town 3rds	Veryan	Tregrehan Mills	Pensilva	Foxhole Stars Reserves
2016–17	St Minver	St Dennis Reserves	Godolphin Atlantic Reserves	St Minver Reserves	Dobwalls Reserves	Lamerton Community
2017–18	St Stephen	St Newlyn East	Stoke Climsland	Lamerton Community	Polperro Reserves	
2018–19	Foxhole Stars	Stoke Climsland	Altarnun	Polperro Reserves	Nanpean Rovers	
2019–20	season abandoned					
2020–21	season abandoned					
	One East	One West	Two			
2021–22	North Petherwin	Nanpean Rovers	Foxhole Stars Reserves			
2022–23	Southgate Seniors	Pensilva	Lanreath			
