= Penryn Athletic F.C. =

Association football club in England

Coordinates: 50°09′48″N 5°07′00″W

Penryn Athletic
- Full name: Penryn Athletic Football Club
- Nickname: The Borough
- Founded: 1963
- Ground: Kernick Road, Penryn
- Capacity: 1500
- Chairman: Kevin Quintrell
- Manager: Drew Symons
- League: St Piran League Premier Division West
- 2025–26: St Piran League Premier Division West, 10th of 14
Home colours

Penryn Athletic F.C. is a football club based in Penryn, Cornwall, in the United Kingdom. Their women's team play in Division One of the Earthbound Electrical Cornwall Women's Football League and the men's team play in the St Piran League Premier Division West, and stage their home games at the 1,500 capacity Kernick Road ground. They also run a team in the Trelawny League.

== History ==
Penryn Athletic F.C. is a football club based in Penryn, Cornwall, in the United Kingdom. Their women's team play in Division One of the Earthbound Electrical Cornwall Women's Football League and the men's team play in the St Piran league, and stage their home games at the 1,500 capacity Kernick Road ground. They also run a team in the Trelawny League.

Penryn Athletic Football Club was formed in October 1963 by a group of schoolboys, who after playing in the County youth system the joined the Falmouth/Helston League Division two in 1965, as a men's team. Twelve years later in 1977 Penryn were elected to the Cornwall Combination League. During their time in the Cornwall combination the club went on to win the league three times in the 1981–82, 1982–83 and 1984–85 seasons. After the last of the Cornwall Combination league titles the club joined the South Western League in 1985 for a single season, returning to the Combination League again. They remained in the Cornwall combination league, winning six more league titles, until the 2000–01 season when they joined the South Western league.

In 2002 the club gained the FA's Charter Standard Community Club status after they linked up with local youth team Falmouth United.

The 2005–06 season saw floodlights erected at the Kernick ground. On the football side, the 2005–06 season saw them as runners up in the South Western League Cup, losing out in the replay to South Western league winners, Bodmin Town. Also that season, they reached the first round of the FA Vase, and in 2006–07 they entered the FA Cup for the first time, losing 3–2 in the preliminary round to Slimbridge.

In 2007 they became founding members of the South West Peninsula League joining Division One West and have since remained in this division. In the 2011–12 season the club, under the management of Andy Parry, won their first ever Senior Trophy when they picked up the Cornwall Charity Cup.

== Ground ==
Penryn Athletic play their games at Kernick, Kernick Road, Penryn TR10 9DG. The ground has had floodlighting installed and has a 1500 capacity. The Pitch at the ground has been awarded some prizes, winning the best South Western League pitch for seven seasons in a row from the 2000–01 season. They also won first place in the South & South West section of the FA's National pitch competition.

== Honours ==
- Cornwall Combination:
  - Winners (10): 1981–82, 1982–83, 1984–85, 1986–87, 1989–90, 1992–93, 1993–94, 1995–96, 1999–2000, 2003–04^{†}
  - Runners-up (10): 1980–81, 1983–84, 1988–89, 1990–91, 1991–92, 1994–95, 1996–97, 1997–98, 1998–99, 2009–10^{†}
- Cornwall Charity Cup:
  - Winners (1):' 2011–12
- Cornwall Combination League Cup:
  - Winners (4):' 1988–89, 1989–90, 1995–96, 2006–07^{†}
- South Western League Cup:
  - Runners-up (1): 2005–06
- Supplementary Cup
  - Winners (1) 1986–87

^{†} Penryn Athletic Reserves

== Club records ==
- Highest League Position: 6th in South Western League 2005–06
- FA Cup best performance: Preliminary round 2006–07
- FA Vase best performance: Fourth round 2005–06, 2006–07
