= Tavistock A.F.C. =

Association football club in England

Coordinates: 50°32′20.04″N 4°09′05.53″W

Tavistock
- Full name: Tavistock Association Football Club
- Nicknames: The Lambs, Tavi
- Founded: 1888
- Ground: Langsford Park, Tavistock
- Capacity: 2,000 (200 seated)
- Manager: Vacant
- League: Western League Premier Division
- 2025–26: Southern League Division One South, 22nd of 22 (relegated)
- Website: www.tavistockfc.com/category/news/tavistockfc.com
| Home colours | Away colours |

Tavistock Association Football Club is a football club based in Tavistock, Devon, England. They play in the Western League Premier Division.

== History ==
The club was formed on 8 September 1888, when sportsman and businessman Herbert Spencer summoned "interested persons to assemble at the Guildhall" where a committee would be elected under the chairmanship of his brother, Wilfred, with Herbert as his deputy and another brother, Kingsley, on the committee. They played their first games at the old Tavistock Grammar School playing fields, playing in the Devon League. In their second season, 1889 – 1890, they became the first winners of the Devon Senior Cup. In the 1900–01 season, the club then claimed their first Devon League title.

After the first world war, the club achieved success in the Devon league, Senior Cup, and Bedford Cup, during the 1920s, however, the club had to cease playing football at the end of the 1931–32 season due to debt. The club started playing again in 1937, and in 1939, amalgamated with three other local teams, Tavistock Comrades, Bannawell Blues United, and Tavistock West End. With this amalgamation, the club changed the colours of their strips from salmon pink shirts with chocolate collars and cuffs, to the present day red and black stripes.

After World War II, the club joined the Plymouth Combination League First Division. In 1947, the Club President Herbert Thomas Langsford purchased their current home of Langsford Park and then two years later giving it under trust to the club. With a new ground the club entered the FA cup for the first time in the 1948–49 season.

They joined the South Western League for its second season in 1952. Apart from an eight-season sojourn spent back in local football, they had remained members of the South Western League until 2007 when they became founding members of the South West Peninsula League Premier Division. On only one occasion had they challenged for the South Western League title, on the 50th anniversary of their original entry into the league when, in 2002–03 they took the runner-up spot.

In recent times, Tavistock have entered the FA Vase in the 2004–05 season and made a mark in only their second season of entry, when in 2005–06 they reached the fourth round (last 32) before going out in North Yorkshire at Pickering Town. They were a founding member of the South West Peninsula League Premier Division in 2007, and were relegated after a 19th-place finish for the first time to Division One East after eight seasons. At the end of the 2014–15 season, Tavistock clinched the Division One East title to return to the Premier Division after one season, beating Sidmouth Town at home 3–0. After finishing 3rd in their first season back in the top flight, they won the league 2016–17.

In 2018-19, they finished top of the SWPL league again and after one of the tightest contests with Exmouth Town that went to the last game of the season, they were promoted to the Western League for the first time in their history.

== Ground ==
Tavistock play their games at Langsford Park, Crowndale Road, Tavistock PL19 8JR.

The ground had new LED floodlights installed in 2017, and has a capacity of 2,000, with a stand for 200 people. There is a carved commemorative stone, dedicated to the Club President Herbert Thomas Langsford who gave the land to the club and who the ground is named after.

The ground has won several awards including:

- Jewson South Western League Ground of the Year: 1996–97
- South West Peninsula League Ground of the Year: 2009–10
- South West Peninsula League Ground of the Year: 2014–15
- South West Peninsula League Ground of the Year: 2015–16

== Honours ==
- Western Football League
  - Champions (1): 2021–22
- South West Peninsula League Premier Division:
  - Champions (2): 2016–17, 2018–19
- South West Peninsula League Division One East:
  - Champions (1): 2014–15
- South Western League:
  - Runners-up (1): 2002–03
- Devon League:
  - Winners (1): 1900–01
  - Runners-up (1): 1889–90
- Plymouth Combination League Division One:
  - Winners (1): 1950–51
  - Runners-up (1): 1948–49
- Devon Senior Cup:
  - Winners (4): 1889–90, 1968–69, 1977–78, 1982–83
  - Runners-up (2): 1900–01, 1927–28
- South Western League Challenge Cup:
  - Winners (1): 1968–69,
  - Runners-up (2): 1976–77, 1984–85
- Throgmorton Cup:
  - Runners-up (1): 2007–08
- Challenge Bowl:
- Winners 2025-26
- Southern Cup:
  - Runners-up (1): 1897–98
- Bedford Cup:
  - Winners (11): 1920–21, 1948–49, 1949–50, 1976–77, 1977–78, 1983–84, 1986–87, 1989–90, 1996–97, 2004–05, 2005–06
  - Runners-up (1): 1981–82
- Victory Cup:
  - Winners (1): 1949–50

== Club records ==
- Highest League Position: 6th in Southern League, Division One South 2022–23
- FA Cup best performance: Third qualifying round 1954–55, 2019–20
- FA Trophy best performance: Second round 2022–23
- FA Vase best performance: Fourth round 2005–06

== Committee members ==
- President: Geoffrey Cox Q.C., M.P.
- Chairman:
- Football secretary: Lisa Fletcher
- Board Members: Jon Ascot, Matthew Miller, Karl Gatcum, Tony Dwelly, Pete Crockford
- Trustees: I. Langsford, M.J. Symons
- Honorary Life Members: R. Bartlett, R. Daw, D.E. Greening, J. Greening, S Greening, A.J. Meeds, D.R.D. Pethick, D.K. Symons, M.J. Symons, K. Wood.

== Management team ==
- First team manager: Vacant
- First team assistant:Chris McPhee
- Coaching Staff: Scott Telford, Louis Ormston
- Physio: Richard Haydon
- Captain: Shane White

== Former players ==
1. Players that have played/managed in the football league or any foreign equivalent to this level (i.e. fully professional league).
2. Players with full international caps.

- (England) Marcus Crocker
- (England) Bill Fellowes
- (England) Kevin Parker
- (England) Eric Davis
- (England) Paul Adcock
- (England) Ben Camara
- (Scotland) Doug Baird
- (Wales) Bill Shortt
- (England) Mike Trebilcock
- (England) Neil Langman
- (England) Roger Frude
- (England) Ryan Eaton
- (England) Daniel Sullivan
- (Italy) Antonio Ambrosano
