= East Cornwall League =

- Founded: 1960
- Folded: 2023
- Country: England
- Divisions: 1
- Number of clubs: 16
- Feeder to: St Piran League; East Division
- Relegation to: Duchy League

The East Cornwall Premier League (ECPL) was an English football competition based in Cornwall and west Devon, in the United Kingdom, formed in 1960. The league last consisted of 16 clubs. Due to a sponsorship arrangement, the league was latterly known as the RRL East Cornwall Premier League.

Up to 20 clubs competed in a single division until the 2005–06 season, after which the league was split into two divisions for the first time, with the top 14 clubs from 2005–06 forming the Premier Division and the remaining clubs and a number of Plymouth-based sides transferring from the Plymouth and West Devon League to form a new Division One. Three teams from the East Cornwall League (Camelford, Dobwalls and Foxhole Stars) were promoted as founder members of the new South West Peninsula League Division One West in 2007. Premier Division champions St. Dennis were promoted at the end of the 2010–11 season, runners-up Sticker were promoted at the end of the 2011–12 season and Millbrook were promoted at the end of the 2013–14 season after finishing third.

For the 2019–20 season, the league reverted to one division after the creation of the St Piran League. Following the 2022–23 season, the East Cornwall League was absorbed into the St Piran League.

== Member clubs for 2022–23 season ==
- Foxhole Stars
- Liskeard Athletic Reserves
- Looe Town
- Nanpean Rovers
- Newquay Academy
- North Petherwin
- Roche
- St Blazey Reserves
- St Columb
- St Dennis Reserves
- St Minver
- St Newlyn East
- St Stephen
- St Teath
- Torpoint Athletic 3rds
- Wadebridge Town Reserves

== Recent champions ==
- 1990–91 – St Blazey Reserves
- 1991–92 – St Dennis
- 1992–93 – Liskeard Athletic Reserves
- 1993–94 – Liskeard Athletic Reserves
- 1994–95 – Nanpean Rovers
- 1995–96 – Saltash United Reserves
- 1996–97 – Nanpean Rovers
- 1997–98 – Callington Town
- 1998–99 – Callington Town
- 1999–2000 – St Dennis
- 2000–01 – Liskeard Athletic Reserves
- 2001–02 – Liskeard Athletic Reserves
- 2002–03 – Foxhole Stars
- 2003–04 – Liskeard Athletic Reserves
- 2004–05 – Foxhole Stars
- 2005–06 – Saltash United Reserves
- 2006–07 – Foxhole Stars (Premier), Tamarside (Division One)
- 2007–08 – Torpoint Athletic Reserves (Premier), St Stephen (Division One)
- 2008–09 – Torpoint Athletic Reserves (Premier), Plymouth Parkway Reserves (Division One)
- 2009–10 – Torpoint Athletic Reserves (Premier), St. Dennis (Division One)
- 2010–11 – St. Dennis (Premier), St. Dominick (Division One)
- 2011–12 – Torpoint Athletic Reserves (Premier), Liskeard Athletic Reserves (Division One)
- 2012–13 – Plymouth Parkway Reserves (Premier), Polperro (Division One)
- 2013–14 – Plymouth Parkway Reserves (Premier), Edgcumbe (Division One)
- 2014–15 – Torpoint Athletic Reserves (Premier), St Stephens Borough (Division One)
- 2015–16 – Torpoint Athletic Reserves (Premier), St Austell Reserves (Division One)
- 2016–17 – Torpoint Athletic Reserves (Premier), Plymouth Parkway Reserves (Division One)
- 2017–18 – Torpoint Athletic Reserves (Premier), Wadebridge Town Reserves (Division One)
- 2018–19 – St Austell Reserves (Premier), St Stephen (Division One)
- 2019–20 – season abandoned
- 2020–21 – season abandoned
- 2021–22 – Torpoint Athletic 3rds
- 2022–23 – Foxhole Stars
