= St Blazey A.F.C. =

Association football club in St Blazey, England

Coordinates: 50°21′41″N 4°42′52″W

St Blazey
- Full name: St Blazey Association Football Club
- Nicknames: The Green & Blacks
- Founded: 1896
- Ground: Blaise Park, St Blazey
- Capacity: 3,500 (200 seated)
- Chairman: Paul Henderson
- Manager: Dan Hart
- League: Western League Premier Division
- 2025–26: Western League Premier Division, 14th of 18
Home colours	Away colours

St Blazey Association Football Club is an English football club based in St Blazey, Cornwall. They compete in the Western League Premier Division. The club was formed in 1896 as a Junior side, attaining Senior status in 1910. St Blazey were a founding member of the South Western League in 1951, which they competed in until 2007 when the league merged with its Devon equivalent, the Devon County League, to form the South West Peninsula League.

The club is recognised as one of the most successful in the county, having won multiple league championships and cup competitions, with their most recent league success coming in the final season of the South Western League in 2007. St Blazey have entered England's most prestigious knockout competition, the FA Cup, in all but one year since 1950. They also enter the FA Vase on a regular basis, having first competed in 1985. The club's traditional colours are green and black. The club's stadium is Blaise Park, which has a capacity of 3,500.

== History ==
The club was formed in 1896 as a Junior club, by Dr. E.S.S. Davis, a member of the Cornwall County Football Association. St Blazey won the Eastern Divisional Cup, Junior Cup, and Bodmin & District League Cup in 1909 and 1910 before it attained Senior status later that year. The club reached the final of the Cornwall Senior Cup twice in the early 1930s, finishing as runners-up on both occasions before winning the competition for the first time in 1936, along with the Cornwall Charity Cup, and Herald Cup to become the first club to win all three trophies in one season. St Blazey were a founder member of the South Western League in 1951, a league which they won thirteen times, including the 2001–02 season when they suffered no league defeats en route to winning the trophy. The club achieved thirty-three victories, and three draws from thirty-six league matches that season, earning 102 points.

St Blazey entered the FA Cup for the first time in 1950, where they were eliminated in the Preliminary Round to Ilfracombe Town. The club's best season in the competition came in 1998 when they reached the Fourth Qualifying Round against Camberley Town, falling agonisingly short of the First Round. The club competed in the FA Trophy for the first time in 1969. Their best season in the competition came a year later when they took Bromsgrove Rovers to a First Round replay, having progressed through three Qualifying Rounds.

The club continued to compete in the South Western League until 2007 when the competition was merged with the Devon County League to form the South West Peninsula League. St Blazey entered the FA Vase for the first time in 1984, a competition which they continue to compete in regularly alongside the FA Cup. The furthest they got came as recently as 2003 when they reached the Fifth Round before being eliminated by A.F.C. Sudbury, who would finish as runners-up that year.

== Stadium ==
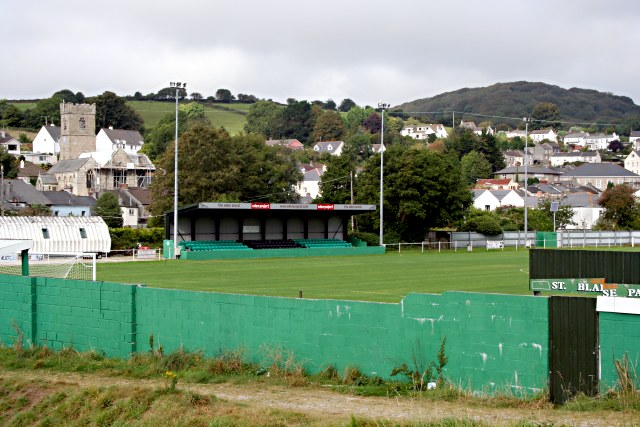

The club play their home games at Blaise Park, Station Road, St Blazey, Cornwall.

Blaise Park is a 3,500 capacity stadium which opened in 1906. The ground was built on reclaimed land from the nearby estuary in the town. It was well used during the First World War as the pitch was dug up and the underlying sand was used to fill sandbags. The club moved back in after the war and constructed a wooden grandstand with bench seating in 1931, painted in the club's colours. A crowd of more than 6,500 were in attendance for a Cornwall Senior Cup match against St Austell in 1949. In common with many non-league grounds, there is a sizeable grass bank which runs the length of the opposite touchline, with the River Par and Atlantic Coast Railway directly behind it.

The old grandstand was demolished at the turn of the twenty-first century and replaced by a concrete and metal structure which has a seating capacity of approximately 200. The only other cover at the ground is provided by a breezeblock and timber lean-to behind the near goal. Directly next to that is the large clubhouse, built in 1972, which leads out onto the car park. Blaise Park was the first sports ground in Cornwall to install floodlights in the late 1950s. They were paid for through a scheme of £1 shares and erected by voluntary labour. They were replaced in November 1989 and inaugurated with a friendly match against Football League club Plymouth Argyle. The stadium is joined to Station Road, which in turn feeds onto the A390, one of the major roads in the county. The nearest train station is Par, approximately one mile away, which provides direct transport to Truro, Plymouth, and London.

== Statistics and records ==
St Blazey are considered to be among the most successful clubs in Cornwall. Its first senior league title came in 1955 when the club became champions of the South Western League, a competition which they have won thirteen times in total, while they have finished as runners-up on another ten occasions. The club has also achieved considerable success in cup competitions, including the Cornwall Senior Cup, a competition which they first won in 1936. St Blazey have won the competition eleven times, with their most recent success coming in 2002. They have finished as runners-up on another ten occasions. The club's most recent success came in 2007 when they won the South Western League and the Cornwall Charity Cup.

The club's first silverware of note came in 1909, while it was still competing at Junior level, when St Blazey won the Cornwall Junior Cup. a competition it would win again the following year. The club has entered all but one edition of the FA Cup since 1950, and the FA Vase since 1984. They also competed in the FA Trophy during the 1970s. The club held a notable record following their unbeaten South Western League season in 2002. The club went 75 matches unbeaten in league competition, which was a record for English football at senior level until it was bettered two years later by AFC Wimbledon, who competed in the Isthmian League at the time.

== Honours ==
=== League honours ===
- South Western Football League
  - Winners (13): 1954–55, 1957–58, 1962–63, 1963–64, 1980–81, 1982–83, 1998–99, 2000–01, 2001–02, 2002–03, 2003–04, 2004–05, 2006–07
  - Runners-up (10): 1951–52, 1955–56, 1956–57, 1961–62, 1984–85, 1986–87, 1988–89, 1989–90, 1990–91, 1999–00
- East Cornwall League Premier Division^{[B]}
  - Winners (1): 1990–91

=== Cup honours ===
- Cornwall Senior Cup
  - Winners (11): 1935–36, 1949–50, 1953–54, 1955–56, 1957–58, 1959–60, 1962–63, 1986–87, 1999–00, 2000–01, 2001–02
  - Runners-up (10): 1931–32, 1934–35, 1947–48, 1958–59, 1961–62, 1963–64, 1964–65, 1965–66, 1979–80, 1986–87, 2002–03
- Cornwall Charity Cup^{[A]}
  - Winners (5): 1935–36, 1998–99, 2001–02, 2005–06, 2006–07
  - Runners-up (1): 2003–04
- South Western League Cup^{[A]}
  - Winners (3): 1999–00, 2001–02, 2004–05
  - Runners-up (3): 1990–91, 2002–03, 2006–07
- Throgmorton Cup
  - Runners-Up (1): 2010–11
- Cornwall Junior Cup
  - Winners (2): 1908–09, 1909–10
  - Runners-up (1): 1911–12

A. ^{a} ^{b} Limited information, may have achieved more.

B. ^{a} Won by reserve team.

== Club records ==
- Highest League Position:
  - 4th in South West Peninsula League Premier Division: 2009–10
- FA CUP Best Performance
  - Fourth Qualifying Round: 1998–99
- FA Trophy Best Performance
  - First Round: 1970–71
- FA VASE Best Performance
  - Fifth Round: 2002–03

== Current management ==
- Club chairman: Paul Henderson
- Vice chairman: Paul Bowden
- Club secretary: Chris Lydon
- Treasurer: Martin Richards
- Football secretary: Adam Tonkin
- First-team Manager: Dan Hart
- Assistant Head-Coach: Todd Hanrahan
- Physiotherapist: Lauren Lyndon Hill
- 2nd Team Manager: Martyn Ratcliffe
- 2nd Team Assistant:

== Notable players ==
1. Players that have played/managed in the football league or any foreign equivalent to this level (i.e. fully professional league).
2. Players with full international caps.
- (England) Danny Bance
- (England) Derek Bellotti – Charlton Athletic, Swansea City, and Southend United player.
- (England) Marcus Crocker
- (England) Steve Davey – Plymouth Argyle, Portsmouth, and Hereford United player.
- Nigel Martyn – England, Bristol Rovers, Crystal Palace, Everton, and Leeds United player.
- (England) David Pook
- (England) Ben Rix
- (England) Charlie Rundle
- (England) Jared Sims
- (England) Shaun Taylor – Bristol City, Swindon Town, and Exeter City player.
- (England) Percy Varco – Aston Villa, Norwich City, and Queens Park Rangers player.
- Stephen Nute Exeter City Player

== Former coaches ==
1. Managers/Coaches that have played/managed in the football league or any foreign equivalent to this level (i.e. fully professional league).
2. Managers/Coaches with full international caps.
- (England) Dave Philp
