= Porthleven F.C. =

Association football club in England

Coordinates: 50°05′17.15″N 5°19′04.99″W

Porthleven
- Full name: Porthleven Football Club
- Nickname: The Fishermen
- Founded: 1896
- Ground: Gala Parc, Porthleven
- Capacity: 1,500 (50 seated)
- League: St Piran League Premier Division West
- 2025–26: St Piran League Premier Division West, 3rd of 14
Home colours

Porthleven Football Club is a Cornish football club based in Porthleven in Cornwall. Founded in 1896, the club competed in the South Western League from 1967 to 1977 and again from 1989 until the dissolution of the league in 2007, when they joined the new South West Peninsula League. They currently play in the St Piran League Premier Division West.

== History ==
Porthleven were established in 1896 and were founding members of the Cornwall Combination in 1959, winning the inaugural league title. After winning the Cornwall Combination three more times they moved up to the South Western League for the 1967–68 season. This proved to be a harder competition and, despite finishing in fifth place in their first season, the club were usually found in mid-table. After a poor 1976–77 season the club dropped back down, replacing their reserve side in the Cornwall Combination.

Another twelve-year spell in the Combination followed until, with two league titles and four other top three places behind them, Porthleven moved up again to the South Western League for the 1989–90 season. After seven years of fluctuating fortunes, the club began to enjoy more success from the 1996–97 season onwards. For eight straight years, mostly under the managership of Alan Carey, they finished in the top three. However, the ultimate prize – the league title – eluded them.

Following Carey's departure at the end of the 2003–04 season the club were forced to rebuild their squad, and consequently finished bottom of the South Western League in 2004–05, with the reserves suffering the same fate in the Cornwall Combination. Having successfully avoided re-election, Porthleven improved on this performance in subsequent seasons, and in 2006–07 finished 9th, high enough to obtain a place in the Premier Division of the newly formed South West Peninsula League. However, Porthleven withdrew their application for a place in the Premier Division for financial reasons, and from 2007 to 2008 they will compete in the South West Peninsula League Division One West.

Porthleven have entered the FA Cup on five occasions, but have only won one match and have never made it through the preliminary rounds to the qualifying rounds. In the FA Vase success has been more forthcoming, with the club reaching the quarter-finals in 1997–98, becoming only the second Cornish club to reach that stage. They then went on to reach the third round or better in each of the next five consecutive seasons.

In June 2012 before the 2012–13 season, the club faced some bad news when the FA refused to allow them to enter any national FA competitions because they do not have toilet facilities in the home and away dressing room, and the referee's room.

== Recent season-by-season record ==
Season	Division	Position	Notes
1997–98	South Western League	3	FA Vase Quarter Finalists
1998–99	South Western League	2	
1999-00	South Western League	3	
2000–01	South Western League	2	
2001–02	South Western League	2	
2002–03	South Western League	3	
2003–04	South Western League	3	
2004–05	South Western League	17	
2005–06	South Western League	10	
2006–07	South Western League	9	
2007–08	South West Peninsula League Division One West	2	
2008–09	South West Peninsula League Division One West	6	
2009–10	South West Peninsula League Division One West	11	
2010-11	South West Peninsula League Division One West	6	
2011-12	South West Peninsula League Division One West	12	
2012-13	South West Peninsula League Division One West	11	
2013-14	South West Peninsula League Division One West	11	
2014-15	South West Peninsula League Division One West	11	

Records dating back to the 1959–60 season are at the Football Club History Database.

== Ground ==
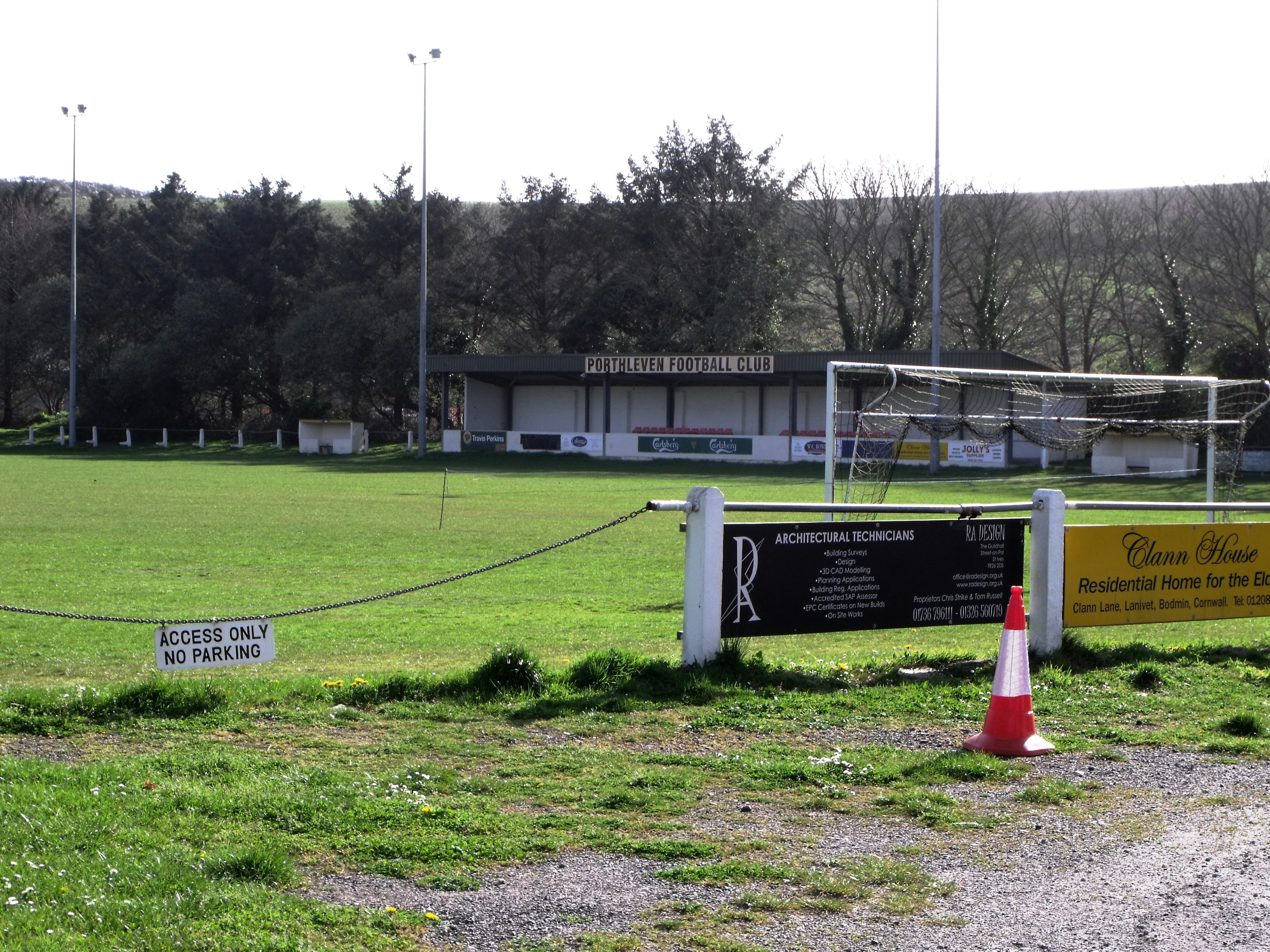
playing field

Porthleven play their home games at Gala Parc, Mill Lane, Porthleven, Cornwall, TR13 9LQ.

== Achievements ==
- South West Peninsula League Division One west
  - Runners Up (1): 2007–08
- South Western League
  - Runners-up (3): 1998–99, 2000–01, 2001–02
- Cornwall Combination
  - Winners (6): 1959–60, 1963–64, 1965–66, 1966–67, 1978–79, 1988–89
  - Runners-up (5): 1960–61, 1964–65, 1977–78, 1984–85, 1987–88

== Notable ex-players ==
- Gary Bannister
- Martin Gritton
- George Torrance
- Lee Mitchell
