= Wadebridge Town F.C. =

Association football club in England

Coordinates: 50°31′20.84″N 4°49′36.61″W

Wadebridge Town
- Full name: Wadebridge Town Football Club
- Nickname: The Bridgers
- Founded: 1894
- Ground: Bodieve Park, Wadebridge
- Chairman: Steve Cudmore
- Manager: Lewis Challen
- League: South West Peninsula League Premier Division West
- 2025–26: South West Peninsula League Premier Division West, 12th of 15
Home colours	Away colours

Wadebridge Town Football Club is a football club based in Wadebridge, Cornwall, England, in the UK. They play in the South West Peninsula League Premier Division West. The club is affiliated to the Cornwall County Football Association.

== History ==
They were established in 1894 and joined the South Western League for its second season in 1952 and remained in membership until 2007 when they became founder members of the South West Peninsula League Division One West. During their time in the South Western League they had never won the league title, but on three occasions had finished in the runner-up spot. In their first season in the South West Peninsula league the club gained promotion to the Premier Division as champions. The club remained in the Premier Division until the end of the 2010–11 season when they finished bottom of the Premier division and were relegated back to Division One west.

They have competed in all three of the main national competitions, without any major success. The club has reached the third qualifying round of the FA Cup three times, the last being over thirty years ago, and prior to being accepted for the 2006–07 season, they hadn't been played in the tournament since 1984–85. They were among the teams selected for the first FA Trophy competition in 1969–70, but in six seasons never progressed past the qualifying rounds, and in a similar number of entries in the FA Vase their best run was to the third round in 1982–83.

== Ground ==
Wadebridge Town play their games at Bodieve Park, Wadebridge PL27 6DJ. They have played at this ground since 1949.

The ground has seen a number of major improvements in recent years, with a new grandstand to replace the original wooden one, the installation of floodlights in 2004, and most recently, a project to reduce the slope of the pitch. In late 2006, however, the club applied for outline planning permission to build offices on their existing ground and to build a new pitch, to be shared with Wadebridge School.

== Honours ==
=== League honours ===
- South Western League
  - Runners-up (3): 1968–69, 1978–79, 1979–80
- South West Peninsula League Division One West
  - Champions (1): 2007–08

=== Cup honours ===
- South West Peninsula League Charity Vase
  - Winners (1): 2007–08

== Records ==
- Highest League Position: 2nd in South Western League 1968–69, 1978–79, 1979–80
- FA Cup best performance: Third qualifying round 1958–59, 1968–69, 1969–70, 1971–72
- FA Trophy best performance: Third qualifying round 1970–71
- FA Vase best performance: Third round 1982–83

== Former players ==
1. Players that have played/managed in the football league or any foreign equivalent to this level (i.e. fully professional league).
2. Players with full international caps.
- (England) John Brown
- (England) Reg Wyatt
