= Cornwall Combination =

Association football league in Cornwall, England

Cornwall Combination League
- Founded: 1959
- Folded: 2023
- Country: Cornwall
- Divisions: 1
- Number of clubs: 14
- Feeder to: St Piran League; West Division
- Relegation to: Trelawny League

The Cornwall Combination League was an English football competition based in the western half of Cornwall, formed in 1959. The last league sponsors were drinks retailers LWC.

The league once had a single division of 20 clubs, being larger than any league below step 6 in the English football league system. The Champion club could apply for promotion to the St Piran Football League, West Division. The bottom clubs were liable to relegation to one of the lower leagues of the English football league system – normally the Trelawny League.

The only time a club from the league has played in the FA Cup was when Falmouth Town played a single match in 1983–84, the only season Falmouth's first team played in the Combination.

In 2009, Troon were accepted back into the league after an eight-season absence to replace the promoted Perranporth. In 2010, Pendeen returned to the league after 12 seasons in junior football and Portreath were relegated. In 2011, Falmouth Athletic DC were promoted into the league at the expense of Ludgvan who were relegated. Helston Athletic took the title and accepted promotion into the South West Peninsula League in Division One West. In 2012, Goonhavern and Ludgvan returned to the Combination League after finishing top two in the Trelawny League whilst Penzance Reserves were relegated to the Trelawny League. Redruth United joined the league for the 2013–14 competition replacing Holman Sports who were relegated and for the 2014-15 season Helston Athletic Reserves joined the league from the Trelawny League, replacing Falmouth Athletic who folded.

After the 2022–23 season, the league was absorbed into the St Piran League.

== Member clubs 2022–23 ==
- Goonhavern Athletic*
- Hayle Reserves
- Helston Athletic 3rds
- Mawnan
- Pendeen Rovers
- Porthleven Reserves
- Praze
- RNAS Culdrose
- Rosudgeon
- St Agnes Reserves
- St Day Reserves
- St Ives Town
- St Just
- Wendron United 3rds

* Club resigned during the season

== List of Champions ==
- 1959-60 – Porthleven
- 1960–61 – Nanpean Rovers
- 1961–62 – St Just
- 1962–63 – St Breward
- 1963–64 – Porthleven
- 1964–65 – Helston Athletic Reserves
- 1965–66 – Porthleven
- 1966–67 – Porthleven
- 1967–68 – St Breward
- 1968–69 – St Breward
- 1969–70 – Falmouth Docks
- 1970–71 – Illogan Royal British Legion
- 1971–72 – Illogan Royal British Legion
- 1972–73 – Newquay Reserves
- 1973–74 – Illogan Royal British Legion
- 1974–75 – Newquay Reserves
- 1975–76 – St Dennis
- 1976–77 – Perranwell
- 1977–78 – Marazion Blues
- 1978–79 – Porthleven
- 1979–80 – Marazion Blues
- 1980–81 – Penryn Athletic
- 1981–82 – Penryn Athletic
- 1982–83 – Penryn Athletic
- 1983–84 – Falmouth Town
- 1984–85 – Penryn Athletic
- 1985–86 – Mullion
- 1986–87 – Penryn Athletic
- 1987–88 – Helston Athletic
- 1988–89 – Porthleven
- 1989–90 – Penryn Athletic
- 1990–91 – Mullion
- 1991–92 – Mullion
- 1992–93 – Penryn Athletic
- 1993–94 – Penryn Athletic
- 1994–95 – Truro City Reserves
- 1995–96 – Penryn Athletic
- 1996–97 – Perranwell
- 1997–98 – Perranwell
- 1998–99 – Truro City Reserves
- 1999–2000 – Penryn Athletic
- 2000–01 – Helston Athletic
- 2001–02 – St Agnes
- 2002–03 – St Agnes
- 2003–04 – Penryn Athletic Reserves
- 2004–05 – Goonhavern Athletic (promoted)
- 2005–06 – Truro City Reserves
- 2006–07 – Illogan Royal British Legion
- 2007–08 – Truro City Reserves (promoted)
- 2008–09 – Perranporth (promoted)
- 2009–10 – Illogan Royal British Legion
- 2010–11 – Helston Athletic (promoted)
- 2011–12 – Falmouth Town Reserves
- 2012–13 – Illogan Royal British Legion
- 2013–14 – Illogan Royal British Legion (promoted)
- 2014–15 – Mullion
- 2015–16 – Ludgvan
- 2016–17 – Carharrack
- 2017–18 – Perranporth
- 2018–19 – Perranporth
- 2019–20 – Season abandoned
- 2020–21 – Season abandoned
- 2021–22 – Helston Athletic 3rds
- 2022–23 – St Just
