= 2008–09 South West Peninsula League =

Football competition in England

The 2008–09 South West Peninsula League season was the second in the history of the South West Peninsula League, a football competition in England, that feeds the Premier Division of the Western Football League. The league had been formed in 2007 from the merger of the Devon County League and the South Western League, and is restricted to clubs based in Cornwall and Devon. The Premier Division of the South West Peninsula League is on the same level of the National League System as the Western League Division One.

The champions for the second season running were Bodmin Town.

== Premier Division ==
South West Peninsula League

The Premier Division featured 20 teams, increased from 18 the previous season. Two new clubs joined the league:

- Newton Abbot, third-placed club in Division One East.
- Wadebridge Town, champions of Division One West.

=== League table ===
Pos	Team	Pld	W	D	L	GF	GA	GD	Pts	Relegation
1	Bodmin Town (C)	36	27	5	4	88	25	+63	86	
2	Plymouth Parkway	36	22	7	7	99	46	+53	73	
3	Buckland Athletic	36	21	9	6	79	39	+40	72	
4	Ivybridge Town	36	21	8	7	88	61	+27	71	
5	Saltash United	36	20	8	8	98	53	+45	68	
6	Tavistock	36	20	5	11	70	58	+12	63 (Note: Tavistock had two points deducted.)	
7	Dartmouth	36	18	5	13	72	70	+2	59	
8	Cullompton Rangers	36	18	2	16	80	70	+10	56	
9	Torpoint Athletic	36	16	5	15	75	79	−4	53	
10	Launceston	36	14	6	16	72	70	+2	48	
11	Witheridge	36	13	8	15	64	54	+10	47	
12	St Blazey	36	11	10	15	64	74	−10	43	
13	Wadebridge Town	36	11	8	17	54	71	−17	41	
14	Falmouth Town	36	10	6	20	48	73	−25	36	
15	Holsworthy	36	9	6	21	48	103	−55	33	
16	Liskeard Athletic	36	9	5	22	39	69	−30	32	
17	Clyst Rovers	36	9	4	23	58	104	−46	31	
18	Elburton Villa	36	7	6	23	55	88	−33	27	
19	Newton Abbot Spurs (R)	36	7	5	24	36	80	−44	26	Relegation to Division One East
20	Newton Abbot	0	0	0	0	0	0	0	0 (Note: Newton Abbot were expelled from the league on 6 November 2008 after they failed to fulfil two fixtures. The club subsequently folded.)	Club expelled, record expunged

Updated to match(es) played on 7 May 2009. Source:
Rules for classification: 1) points; 2) goal difference; 3) number of goals scored.
(C) Champions; (R) Relegated

== Division One East ==
- Division One East consisted of eighteen clubs, increased from seventeen the previous season.
- Newton Abbot were promoted to the Premier Division and Plymstock United were transferred to Division One West, and three new clubs joined the division: Exeter Civil Service, Bovey Tracey and Royal Marines.
- Galmpton United merged with Torbay Gentlemen to form Galmpton United & Torbay Gents.

Pos	Team	Pld	W	D	L	GF	GA	GD	Pts	Promotion
1	Exeter Civil Service (C)	32	22	6	4	80	39	+41	72	
2	Bovey Tracey (P)	32	23	2	7	86	37	+49	71	Promotion to the Premier Division
3	Stoke Gabriel	32	21	2	9	89	41	+48	65	
4	Appledore	32	20	4	8	76	40	+36	64	
5	Galmpton United & Torbay Gents	32	18	3	11	71	57	+14	57	
6	University of Exeter	32	16	6	10	65	58	+7	54	
7	Royal Marines	32	15	4	13	94	59	+35	49	
8	Axminster Town	32	15	4	13	68	67	+1	49	
9	Budleigh Salterton	32	14	6	12	68	58	+10	48	
10	Teignmouth	32	15	1	16	66	60	+6	46	
11	Alphington	32	13	3	16	61	70	−9	42	
12	Totnes & Dartington	32	10	8	14	62	72	−10	38	
13	Crediton United	32	10	5	17	48	58	−10	35	
14	Okehampton Argyle	32	7	8	17	51	97	−46	29	
15	Exmouth Town	32	8	4	20	46	95	−49	28	
16	Liverton United	32	7	3	22	47	82	−35	24	
17	Ottery St Mary	32	2	3	27	25	113	−88	9	
18	Buckfastleigh Rangers	0	0	0	0	0	0	0	0	Resigned mid-season, record expunged

(C) Champions; (P) Promoted

== Division One West ==
- Division One West consisted of seventeen clubs, increased from sixteen the previous season.
- Wadebridge Town were promoted to the Premier Division and Goonhavern Athletic left the league.
- Three new clubs joined: Godolphin Atlantic, Plymstock United (transferred from Division One East) and Truro City Reserves.

Pos	Team	Pld	W	D	L	GF	GA	GD	Pts	Promotion
1	Penzance (C, P)	32	24	3	5	107	39	+68	75	Promotion to the Premier Division
2	Newquay	32	23	2	7	98	46	+52	71	
3	St Austell	32	21	7	4	90	40	+50	70	
4	Penryn Athletic	32	20	2	10	72	50	+22	62	
5	Callington Town	32	19	4	9	75	46	+29	61	
6	Porthleven	32	19	2	11	95	59	+36	59	
7	Dobwalls	32	15	4	13	63	51	+12	49	
8	Camelford	32	13	6	13	59	66	−7	45	
9	Foxhole Stars	32	12	8	12	69	66	+3	44	
10	Truro City Reserves	32	13	5	14	56	68	−12	44	
11	Godolphin Atlantic	32	13	4	15	56	63	−7	43	
12	Mousehole	32	11	3	18	55	79	−24	36	
13	Hayle	32	9	7	16	65	72	−7	34	
14	Plymstock United	32	7	5	20	45	77	−32	26	
15	Vospers Oak Villa	32	6	4	22	44	93	−49	22	
16	Wendron CC United	32	5	5	22	31	97	−66	20	
17	Millbrook	32	5	3	24	40	108	−68	18	

(C) Champions; (P) Promoted
