= 2009–10 South West Peninsula League =

Football competition in England

The 2009–10 South West Peninsula League season was the third in the history of the South West Peninsula League, a football competition in England, that feeds the Premier Division of the Western Football League. The league had been formed in 2007 from the merger of the Devon County League and the South Western League, and is restricted to clubs based in Cornwall and Devon. The Premier Division of the South West Peninsula League is on the same level of the National League System as the Western League Division One.

The champions for the first time in their history were Buckland Athletic.

== Premier Division ==
South West Peninsula League

The Premier Division featured 20 teams, the same as the previous season. Two new clubs joined the league after Newton Abbot were expelled and Newton Abbot Spurs were relegated to Division One East:

- Bovey Tracey, runners-up in Division One East.
- Penzance, champions of Division One West.

=== League table ===
Pos	Team	Pld	W	D	L	GF	GA	GD	Pts	Relegation
1	Buckland Athletic (C)	36	27	6	3	121	46	+75	87	
2	Bodmin Town	36	28	3	5	98	31	+67	87	
3	Falmouth Town	36	23	4	9	87	41	+46	73	
4	St Blazey	36	22	3	11	81	53	+28	69	
5	Tavistock	36	21	3	12	77	52	+25	66	
6	Plymouth Parkway	36	19	7	10	89	53	+36	64	
7	Penzance	36	18	7	11	68	54	+14	61	
8	Torpoint Athletic	36	17	10	9	65	55	+10	61	
9	Saltash United	36	16	10	10	74	49	+25	58	
10	Witheridge	36	17	4	15	83	72	+11	55	
11	Launceston	36	14	5	17	65	67	−2	47	
12	Ivybridge Town	36	11	10	15	57	67	−10	43	
13	Elburton Villa	36	10	11	15	57	78	−21	41	
14	Wadebridge Town	36	10	5	21	53	76	−23	35	
15	Dartmouth	36	10	5	21	48	78	−30	35	
16	Liskeard Athletic	36	7	8	21	54	82	−28	29	
17	Bovey Tracey	36	5	8	23	50	109	−59	23	
18	Cullompton Rangers	36	6	3	27	39	100	−61	21	
19	Holsworthy (R)	36	2	6	28	37	140	−103	12	Relegation to Division One West
20	Clyst Rovers	0	0	0	0	0	0	0	0 (Note: Clyst Rovers resigned from the league on 5 March 2010. The club subsequently folded.)	Resigned, record expunged

Updated to match(es) played on 7 May 2010. Source:
Rules for classification: 1) points; 2) goal difference; 3) number of goals scored.
(C) Champions; (R) Relegated

== Division One East ==
- Division One East consisted of eighteen clubs, the same as the previous season.
- Bovey Tracey were promoted to the Premier Division and Buckfastleigh Rangers had resigned during the previous season. They were replaced by Newton Abbot Spurs (relegated from the Premier Division) and Bickleigh.

Pos	Team	Pld	W	D	L	GF	GA	GD	Pts	Promotion
1	Royal Marines (C, P)	34	26	3	5	110	46	+64	81	Promotion to the Premier Division
2	Stoke Gabriel	34	22	3	9	92	43	+49	69	
3	Liverton United	34	19	8	7	82	47	+35	65	
4	Galmpton United & Torbay Gents	34	18	6	10	83	50	+33	60	
5	Appledore	34	18	3	13	89	69	+20	57	
6	Alphington	34	18	3	13	75	55	+20	57	
7	Totnes & Dartington	34	17	5	12	69	50	+19	56	
8	Exmouth Town	34	16	5	13	79	68	+11	53	
9	Budleigh Salterton	34	15	6	13	67	55	+12	51	
10	Exeter Civil Service	34	16	3	15	62	69	−7	51	
11	Teignmouth	34	15	5	14	81	77	+4	50	
12	University of Exeter	34	12	5	17	60	68	−8	41	
13	Newton Abbot Spurs	34	12	4	18	64	86	−22	40	
14	Crediton United	34	10	5	19	59	86	−27	35	
15	Axminster Town	34	11	2	21	56	96	−40	35	
16	Okehampton Argyle	34	10	4	20	67	101	−34	34	Transferred to Division One West
17	Ottery St Mary	34	5	7	22	48	127	−79	22	
18	Bickleigh	34	6	3	25	50	100	−50	21	

(C) Champions; (P) Promoted

== Division One West ==
- Division One West consisted of seventeen clubs, the same as the previous season.
- Penzance were promoted to the Premier Division and were replaced by Perranporth.

Pos	Team	Pld	W	D	L	GF	GA	GD	Pts	Promotion
1	Perranporth (C)	30	20	4	6	78	35	+43	64	
2	St Austell (P)	30	20	2	8	81	39	+42	62	Promotion to the Premier Division
3	Hayle	30	18	2	10	68	37	+31	56	
4	Penryn Athletic	30	17	3	10	69	45	+24	54	
5	Newquay	30	16	4	10	79	62	+17	52	
6	Godolphin Atlantic	30	14	7	9	66	51	+15	49	
7	Plymstock United	30	14	7	9	56	41	+15	49	
8	Camelford	30	14	5	11	62	51	+11	47	
9	Dobwalls	30	13	7	10	55	46	+9	46	
10	Callington Town	30	12	7	11	57	50	+7	43	
11	Porthleven	30	11	6	13	64	67	−3	39	
12	Vospers Oak Villa	30	11	4	15	50	62	−12	37	
13	Foxhole Stars	30	7	7	16	41	78	−37	28	
14	Truro City Reserves	30	6	4	20	35	73	−38	22	
15	Millbrook	30	6	4	20	34	87	−53	22	Left at the end of the season
16	Mousehole	30	1	7	22	18	89	−71	10	
17	Wendron CC United	0	0	0	0	0	0	0	0	Resigned mid-season, record expunged

(C) Champions; (P) Promoted
