= 2012–13 South West Peninsula League =

Football competition in England

The 2012–13 South West Peninsula League season was the sixth in the history of the South West Peninsula League, a football competition in England, that feeds the Premier Division of the Western Football League. The league had been formed in 2007 from the merger of the Devon County League and the South Western League, and is restricted to clubs based in Cornwall and Devon. The Premier Division of the South West Peninsula League is on the same level of the National League System as the Western League Division One.

== Premier Division ==
South West Peninsula League
- Relegated: Penzance

The Premier Division featured 20 teams, the same as the previous season, after Royal Marines were relegated and subsequently folded, and Buckland Athletic were promoted to the Western League Premier Division. Dartmouth resigned before the season began. Two new clubs joined the league:

- Liverton United, champions of Division One East.
- Newquay, champions of Division One West.
- Only Plymouth Parkway applied for promotion to the Western League Premier Division. They were to be promoted if their application was accepted and they finished in either of the top two places in the league. However, they eventually refused promotion on financial grounds.

=== League table ===
Pos	Team	Pld	W	D	L	GF	GA	GD	Pts	Relegation
1	Bodmin Town (C)	36	28	6	2	127	28	+99	90	
2	Plymouth Parkway	36	24	6	6	89	45	+44	78	
3	Elburton Villa	36	24	5	7	95	53	+42	77	
4	St Austell	36	23	5	8	89	45	+44	74	
5	Launceston	36	19	4	13	64	46	+18	61	
6	Saltash United	36	17	9	10	77	43	+34	60	
7	Witheridge	36	17	6	13	84	58	+26	57	
8	St Blazey	36	16	8	12	79	57	+22	56	
9	Camelford	36	16	7	13	76	53	+23	55	
10	Tavistock	36	17	2	17	73	71	+2	53	
11	Liverton United	36	15	5	16	75	72	+3	50	Voluntary demotion to Division One East
12	Newquay	36	15	4	17	68	62	+6	49	
13	Ivybridge Town	36	14	4	18	65	75	−10	46	
14	Torpoint Athletic	36	12	9	15	59	68	−9	45	
15	Bovey Tracey	36	11	9	16	49	84	−35	42	
16	Falmouth Town	36	8	6	22	48	87	−39	30	
17	Cullompton Rangers	36	8	3	25	44	106	−62	27	
18	Liskeard Athletic	36	5	6	25	44	108	−64	20 (Note: Liskeard Athletic had one point deducted for fielding an ineligible player against Newquay on 2 February 2013.)	
19	Penzance (R)	36	0	2	34	22	166	−144	2	Relegation to Division One West
20	Dartmouth	0	0	0	0	0	0	0	0	Resigned before the season started

Updated to match(es) played on 11 May 2013. Source:
Rules for classification: 1) points; 2) goal difference; 3) number of goals scored.
(C) Champions; (R) Relegated

== Division One East ==
- Division One East was reduced to sixteen clubs from seventeen after the resignation of Ottery St Mary, the promotion of Liverton United to the Premier Division and the transfer of Plymstock United from Division One West.

Pos	Team	Pld	W	D	L	GF	GA	GD	Pts	Promotion
1	Exmouth Town (C, P)	30	23	6	1	88	27	+61	75	Promotion to the Premier Division
2	Stoke Gabriel	30	19	7	4	100	49	+51	66 (Note: Axminster Town failed to raise a team for their match at Stoke Gabriel. The table shows a draw, but instead of one point being awarded to each team, Stoke Gabriel were awarded three points, and Axminster had three points deducted.)	
3	Budleigh Salterton	30	18	4	8	73	58	+15	58	
4	Newton Abbot Spurs	30	17	6	7	79	52	+27	57	
5	Appledore	30	17	5	8	67	42	+25	56	
6	Galmpton United	30	14	3	13	58	64	−6	47 (Note: Crediton United failed to raise a team for their match at Galmpton United. The table shows a draw, but instead of one point being awarded to each team, Galmpton were awarded three points, and Crediton had three points deducted.)	
7	Teignmouth	30	14	3	13	73	71	+2	45	
8	Exeter Civil Service	30	11	10	9	55	56	−1	43	
9	Okehampton Argyle	30	11	5	14	59	69	−10	38	
10	University of Exeter	30	8	11	11	63	68	−5	35	
11	Axminster Town	30	10	7	13	56	58	−2	33	
12	Totnes & Dartington	20	9	5	6	62	68	−6	32	
13	Alphington	30	9	5	16	39	65	−26	32	
14	Plymstock United	30	7	4	19	50	76	−26	25	
15	Sidmouth Town	30	3	7	20	33	66	−33	16	
16	Crediton United	30	4	4	22	29	95	−66	12	

(C) Champions; (P) Promoted

== Division One West ==
- Sticker were promoted from the East Cornwall League, replacing Newquay who were promoted to the Premier Division. Plymstock United transferred to Division One East, reducing the number of clubs from seventeen to sixteen.

Pos	Team	Pld	W	D	L	GF	GA	GD	Pts	Promotion
1	Godolphin Atlantic (C, P)	30	27	2	1	99	21	+78	83	Promotion to the Premier Division
2	Helston Athletic	30	21	5	4	135	37	+98	68	
3	Wadebridge Town	30	21	3	6	112	40	+72	66	
4	Sticker	30	18	4	8	68	45	+23	58	
5	Callington Town	30	16	7	7	87	32	+55	57 (Note: Foxhole Stars failed to raise a team for their match at Callington Town. The table shows a draw, but instead of one point being awarded to each team, Callington were awarded three points, and Foxhole had three points deducted.)	
6	St Dennis	30	18	2	10	89	62	+27	56	
7	Penryn Athletic	30	16	5	9	79	55	+24	53	
8	Dobwalls	30	16	5	9	75	63	+12	53	
9	Perranporth	30	13	2	15	64	70	−6	41	
10	Hayle	30	11	7	12	59	49	+10	40	Resigned shortly before the 2013–14 season
11	Porthleven	30	11	3	16	40	65	−25	36	
12	Truro City Reserves	30	11	1	18	49	68	−19	24 (Note: Truro City had ten points deducted for going into administration.)	
13	Holsworthy	30	7	0	23	40	101	−61	21	
14	Vospers Oak Villa	30	6	1	23	46	90	−44	19	
15	Mousehole	30	3	0	27	24	123	−99	9	
16	Foxhole Stars	30	1	1	28	19	164	−145	0	

(C) Champions; (P) Promoted
