= 2011–12 South West Peninsula League =

Football competition in England

The 2011–12 South West Peninsula League season was the fifth in the history of the South West Peninsula League, a football competition in England, that feeds the Premier Division of the Western Football League. The league had been formed in 2007 from the merger of the Devon County League and the South Western League, and is restricted to clubs based in Cornwall and Devon. The Premier Division of the South West Peninsula League is on the same level of the National League System as the Western League Division One.

Bodmin Town won the league for the third time, but did not apply for promotion. Buckland Athletic did apply, and were accepted into the Premier Division of the Western League.

== Premier Division ==
South West Peninsula League

The Premier Division featured 20 teams, the same as the previous season, after Wadebridge Town were relegated to Division One West. One new club joined the league:

- Camelford, champions of Division One West.

=== League table ===
Pos	Team	Pld	W	D	L	GF	GA	GD	Pts	Promotion
1	Bodmin Town (C)	38	36	0	2	145	34	+111	108	
2	Buckland Athletic (P)	38	28	5	5	123	56	+67	89	Promotion to 2012–13 WFL Premier
3	Falmouth Town	38	24	6	8	122	58	+64	78	
4	Saltash United	38	24	5	9	113	59	+54	77	
5	Launceston	38	22	6	10	78	47	+31	72	
6	Plymouth Parkway	38	22	4	12	94	53	+41	70	
7	Liskeard Athletic	38	21	5	12	74	57	+17	68	
8	St Austell	38	19	5	14	79	64	+15	62	
9	Camelford	38	18	3	17	63	64	−1	57	
10	Tavistock	38	15	8	15	79	75	+4	53	
11	Elburton Villa	38	16	5	17	66	71	−5	53	
12	Torpoint Athletic	38	16	3	19	49	74	−25	51	
13	Witheridge	38	15	4	19	59	69	−10	49	
14	Dartmouth	38	13	7	18	57	73	−16	48 (Note: Royal Marines did not fulfil their fixture at Penzance and had one point deducted. Penzance were awarded all three points, although the table shows a 0–0 draw. Penzance subsequently did not fulfil their fixture at Dartmouth, and were deducted one point. Dartmouth were awarded all three points, although the table again shows a 0–0 draw.)	
15	Cullompton Rangers	38	11	6	21	65	79	−14	39	
16	Bovey Tracey	38	10	7	21	47	86	−39	37	
17	Penzance	38	8	3	27	40	110	−70	27	
18	St Blazey	38	8	2	28	41	100	−59	26	
19	Ivybridge Town	38	7	4	27	53	118	−65	25 (Note: Ivybridge Town were reprieved from relegation.)	
20	Royal Marines (R)	38	2	2	34	26	126	−100	6	Folded at the end of the season

Updated to match(es) played on 7 May 2012. Source:
Rules for classification: 1) points; 2) goal difference; 3) number of goals scored.
(C) Champions; (P) Promoted; (R) Relegated

== Division One East ==
- Division One East consisted of seventeen clubs, increased from sixteen the previous season.
- Okehampton Argyle were transferred back from Division One West, and Sidmouth Town joined from the Devon and Exeter League.
- Bickleigh resigned from the league shortly before the season started.
- Galmpton Gents changed their name back to Galmpton United.

Pos	Team	Pld	W	D	L	GF	GA	GD	Pts	Promotion
1	Liverton United (C, P)	32	26	2	4	99	30	+69	80	Promotion to the Premier Division
2	Stoke Gabriel	32	22	5	5	109	57	+52	71	
3	Galmpton United	32	20	5	7	83	53	+30	65	
4	Crediton United	32	19	4	9	81	58	+23	61	
5	Exmouth Town	32	18	5	9	77	40	+37	59	
6	Alphington	32	18	4	10	73	53	+20	58	
7	Teignmouth	32	16	6	10	81	60	+21	54	
8	Okehampton Argyle	32	13	10	9	62	55	+7	49	
9	Newton Abbot Spurs	32	13	8	11	67	63	+4	47	
10	Totnes & Dartington	32	13	5	14	67	68	−1	44	
11	Budleigh Salterton	32	11	7	14	56	75	−19	40	
12	Appledore	32	11	3	18	48	53	−5	36	
13	Exeter Civil Service	32	10	6	16	46	63	−17	36	
14	Sidmouth Town	32	11	1	20	47	75	−28	34	
15	University of Exeter	32	7	8	17	54	71	−17	29	
16	Axminster Town	32	2	1	29	33	124	−91	7	
17	Ottery St Mary	32	1	2	29	28	113	−85	5	Left at the end of the season

(C) Champions; (P) Promoted

== Division One West ==
- Division One West consisted of seventeen clubs, increased from sixteen the previous season.
- Camelford were promoted to the Premier Division, and Okehampton Argyle were transferred back to Division One East. Wadebridge Town were relegated from the Premier Division, Helston Athletic were promoted from the Cornwall Combination and St Dennis were promoted from the East Cornwall League.

Pos	Team	Pld	W	D	L	GF	GA	GD	Pts	Promotion
1	Newquay (C, P)	32	28	3	1	127	33	+94	87	Promotion to the Premier Division
2	Helston Athletic	32	22	7	3	89	39	+50	73	
3	Penryn Athletic	32	22	4	6	94	33	+61	70	
4	Godolphin Atlantic	32	18	8	6	64	29	+35	62	
5	Vospers Oak Villa	32	17	10	5	90	37	+53	61	
6	Callington Town	32	17	3	12	66	54	+12	54	
7	Truro City Reserves	32	15	6	11	70	54	+16	51	
8	Plymstock United	32	13	4	15	56	59	−3	45 (Note: Perranporth failed to raise a team for their match at Plymstock United. The table shows a 0–0 draw, but instead of one point being awarded to each team, Plymstock were awarded three points, and Perranporth had one point deducted.)	Transferred to Division One East
9	St Dennis	32	12	6	14	65	66	−1	42	
10	Dobwalls	32	13	3	16	64	66	−2	42	
11	Wadebridge Town	32	11	8	13	71	61	+10	41	
12	Porthleven	32	13	2	17	55	82	−27	41	
13	Hayle	32	10	6	16	55	64	−9	36	
14	Foxhole Stars	32	8	7	17	49	75	−26	31	
15	Holsworthy	32	8	2	22	46	58	−12	26	
16	Perranporth	32	2	3	27	19	149	−130	7	
17	Mousehole	32	2	0	30	26	147	−121	6	

(C) Champions; (P) Promoted
