= 2020–21 FA Vase =

2020–21 Buildbase FA Vase
Football Association Vase

Tournament details
- Country: England; Wales; Jersey
- Dates: Qualifying: Friday 18 September 2020 – Sunday 11 October 2020; Competition Proper: Saturday 31 October 2020 – Saturday 22 May 2021
- Teams: Qualifying: 551; Competition proper: 61+ (165 from Qualifying); Total teams 612 from Steps 5 & 6 of English National League System

Final positions
- Champions: Warrington Rylands (1st title)
- Runners-up: Binfield

Tournament statistics
- Matches played: Qualifying: 386; Competition Proper: 225; Total Matches: 611

The 2020–21 Buildbase FA Vase was the 47th season of the FA Vase, an annual football competition for teams playing in Levels 9 and 10 (steps 5 & 6) of the English National League System. The competition was played with two qualifying rounds followed by six proper rounds, semi-finals, and the final played at Wembley Stadium. All ties this season were played to a finish on the day. For this season there were no replays in any of the rounds to minimise fixture congestion due to late start of the football season brought about by the COVID-19 pandemic. If games finished level after 90 minutes, the match was decided by penalties to find the winner of the tie, apart from the Final where there were 30 minutes extra time (15 minutes each way) followed by penalties if still level after the extra time period.

Due to UK Government guidelines in relation to COVID-19, the 2020–21 competition's qualifying began before the 2019–20 final was played.

== Calendar ==
The calendar for the 2020–21 Buildbase FA Vase round dates and prize money for the winners and losers of each round announced by English Football Association. All information taken from thefa.com website

Round	Main Date	Number of Fixtures	Clubs Remaining	New Entries This Round	Prize Money Winners	Prize Money Losers
First round qualifying	Saturday 19 September 2020	221	612 → 391	442	£550	£160
Second round qualifying	Saturday 10 October 2020	165	391 → 226	109	£725	£225
First round proper	Saturday 31 October 2020	98	226 → 128	31	£825	£250
Second round proper	Saturday 5 December 2020	64	128 → 64	30	£900	£275
Third round proper	Saturday 19 December 2020	32	64 → 32	None	£1,125	£350
Fourth round proper	Saturday 17 April 2021	16	32 → 16	None	£1,875	£600
Fifth round proper	Saturday 24 April 2021	8	16 → 8	None	£2,250	£725
Quarter-finals	Saturday 1 May 2021	4	8 → 4	None	£4,125	£1,350
Semi-finals	Saturday 8 May 2021	2	4 → 2	None	£5,500	£1,725
Final	Saturday 22 May 2021	1	2 → 1	None	£30,000	£15,000

== First qualifying round ==
The draw was made on 18 August 2020. Fixtures and match results taken from thefa.com website.

Tie	Home team (tier)	Score	Away team (tier)	Att.
Friday 18 September 2020
2	Durham City (10)	0–4	Thackley (9)	120
130	Thame Rangers (10)	0–6	Milton Keynes Irish (10)	75
132	Broadfields United (9)	0–0 (5–4 p)	Aylesbury Vale Dynamos (9)	163
149	Virginia Water (9)	0–1	Reading City (9)	91
198	Fawley (10)	3–4	Ringwood Town (10)	95
69	OJM Black Country (10)	0–1	Rocester (10)	60
93	Barkingside (10)	1–3	Coggeshall United (10)	103
Saturday 19 September 2020
1	Bishop Auckland (9)	1–5	Billingham Synthonia (10)	237
3	Bedlington Terriers (10)	1–2	Heaton Stannington (10)	96
4	Crook Town (10)	1–0	Albion Sports (9)	208
5	Garforth Town (9)	5–1	Sunderland West End (10)	97
6	Willington (10)	0–4	Whickham (9)	132
7	North Shields (9)	3–0	Tow Law (10)	268
8	Northallerton Town (9)	2–0	Billingham Town (9)	191
9	West Allotment Celtic (10)	3–3 (6–7 p)	Penrith (9)	70
10	Ryton & Crawcrook Albion (9)	2–4	Ashington (9)	140
11	Holker Old Boys (10)	3–0	Eccleshill (9)	123
12	Shildon (9)	2–1	Chester-le-Street Town (10)	180
13	Whitley Bay (9)	1–4	Newcastle University (10)	254
14	Guisborough Town (9)	3–0	Washington (10)	268
15	Newton Aycliffe (9)	4–0	Barnoldswick Town (9)	130
16	Birtley Town (10)	1–1 (4–1 p)	Squires Gate F.C. (9)	
17	Harrogate Railway Athletic (10)	1–1 (9–8 p)	Cleator Moor (10)	99
18	Steeton (10)	2–2 (8–9 p)	Jarrow (10)	102
19	Carlisle City (10)	3–5	Nelson (10)	121
20	A.F.C. Blackpool (10)	1–0	Knaresborough Town (9)	102
21	Silsden (9)	3–1	Garstang (10)	115
22	Retford (10)	0–2	Cammell Laird (10)	154
23	Staveley Miners Welfare (9)	0–0 (5–6 p)	A.F.C. Darwen (10)	110
Match played at Sheffield F.C.
24	Skelmersdale United (9)	1–2	Stockport Town (10)	169
25	Hemsworth Miners Welfare (9)	3–2	Armthorpe Welfare (10)	98
26	West Didsbury & Chorlton (10)	2–1	Bury A.F.C. (10)	300
27	Hall Road Rangers (10)	2–4	Barnton (10)	70
28	Litherland Remyca (9)	1–2	Selby Town (10)	88
29	Penistone Church (9)	2–2 (5–4 p)	Prestwich Heys (10)	272
30	Goole (9)	7–3	Cheadle Heath Nomads (10)	78
Match played at Cheadle Heath Nomads.
31	Parkgate (10)	4–0	Worsbrough Bridge Athletic (10)	95
32	Charnock Richard (9)	3–0	Barton Town (9)	173
33	Rossington Main (10)	0–2	Nostell Miners Welfare (10)	90
34	Brigg Town (10)	2–3	Winterton Rangers (10)	260
35	Emley (10)	1–1 (3–5 p)	Irlam (9)	169
36	St Helens Town (10)	0–2	North Ferriby (10)	242
Match played at North Ferriby.
37	Liversedge (9)	3–1	Handsworth (9)	159
38	Swallownest (10)	1–0	Ashton Town (10)	97
39	Daisy Hill (10)	2–5	Warrington Rylands (9)	66
40	Cheadle Town (10)	1–1 (4–3p)	Athersley Recreation (9)	112
41	Golcar United (10)	0–2	Northwich Victoria (9)	300
42	Pilkington (10)	1–3	Bacup Borough (10)	58
Match played at Bacup Borough.
43	Avro (9)	1–0	Bottesford Town (9)	110
44	FC Isle of Man (10)	W/O	A.F.C. Liverpool (10)	
walkover for AFC Liverpool – FC Isle of Man withdrawn
45	Burscough (9)	1–1 (3–4 p)	Hallam (10)	300
Match played at Hallam.
46	Whitchurch Alport (9)	0–2	Littleton (10)	170
49	Highgate United (9)	3–3 (8–7 p)	Wellington (Herefordshire) (10)	85
50	Darlaston Town (10)	2–0	Heather St John's (9)	176
51	Dudley Sports (10)	3–0	Wem Town (10)	35
52	Wolverhampton Sporting (10)	0–1	Bewdley Town (10)	40
53	Heath Hayes (10)	1–2	Dudley Town (10)	143
54	Nuneaton Griff (10)	2–2 (1–4 p)	Chelmsley Town (10)	83
55	Romulus (9)	3–1	Coventry Copeswood (10)	81
56	Paget Rangers (10)	3–1	Wolverhampton Casuals (10)	109
57	Winsford United (9)	4–1	Alsager Town (10)	198
58	Sandbach United (10)	0–1	Stapenhill (10)	142
59	Leicester Road (10)	0–0 (3–0 p)	Haughmond (9)	79
60	St Martins (10)	1–4	Pershore Town (10)	105
61	Coventry Sphinx (9)	1–1 (3–1 p)	Worcester Raiders (10)	100
62	Ellesmere Rangers (10)	3–1	Cradley Town (10)	65
63	Racing Club Warwick (9)	2–1	Hereford Pegasus (10)	63
Match played at Hereford Pegasus.
64	A.F.C. Wulfrunians (9)	0–3	Uttoxeter Town (10)	87
65	A.F.C. Bridgnorth (10)	3–3 (5–4 p)	Wednesfield (10)	97
66	Abbey Hulton United (10)	3–2	Shawbury United (10)	100
67	Rugby Town (9)	1–1 (4–1 p)	Bilston Town (10)	183
68	Stafford Town (10)	0–4	Lichfield City (10)	107
70	Sherwood Colliery (10)	3–0	St Andrews (10)	87
71	Harborough Town (9)	8–1	Barrow Town (10)	148
72	Hucknall Town (10)	1–2	Anstey Nomads (9)	247
73	Selston (9)	3–3 (4–3 p)	Eastwood Community (10)	172
74	Holbeach United (9)	1–5	Loughborough University (9)	90
75	Graham Street Prims (10)	0–3	Leicester Nirvana (9)	65
76	Teversal (10)	0–3	Shirebrook Town (10)	94
77	Dunkirk (10)	1–2	Harrowby United (10)	77
78	Deeping Rangers (9)	10–1	GNG Oadby Town (9)	80
79	Aylestone Park (10)	4–1	Pinchbeck United (9)	95
80	Boston Town (9)	6–0	Sleaford Town (9)	77
81	Ingles (10)	2–0	Saffron Dynamo (10)	82
82	Blackstones (10)	0–3	Lutterworth Athletic (10)	70
83	Clipstone (10)	2–2 (2–3 p)	Radford (10)	81
84	Birstall United (10)	2–0	Holwell Sports (10)	90
85	Clifton All Whites (10)	0–2	Quorn (9)	56
86	Peterborough Northern Star (9)	0–7	Mulbarton Wanderers (10)	30
87	Sheringham (10)	2–0	Newmarket Town (9)	120
88	Huntingdon (10)	0–2	Mildenhall Town (9)	40
89	Diss Town (10)	0–1	Fakenham Town (10)	93
90	Lakenheath (10)	7–1	Framlington Town (10)	83
91	Godmanchester Rovers (9)	0–0 (2–4 p)	Norwich United (9)	95
92	Downham Town (10)	3–0	Ely City (9)	75
94	Colney Heath (9)	0–0 (4–2 p)	Wivenhoe Town (10)	91
95	Brimsdown (10)	2–4	Clapton (9)	50
96	Little Oakley (10)	2–1	Stotfold (10)	106
98	Enfield Borough (10)	3–2	Tower Hamlets (9)	38
100	St. Margaretsbury (9)	1–1 (5–6 p)	London Colney (9)	83
101	Ipswich Wanderers (10)	5–3	Brantham Athletic (9)	94
102	Potton United (9)	2–1	Biggleswade United (9)	158
103	Redbridge (9)	1–3	May & Baker (10)	68
104	Ilford (9)	5–3	Long Melford (9)	85
105	Southend Manor (9)	0–1	Cockfosters (9)	46
106	Sporting Bengal United (9)	3–3 (4–2 p)	Sawbridgeworth Town (9)	39
Match played at Sawbridgeworth Town.
108	Saffron Walden Town (9)	3–3 (1–4 p)	Whitton United (9)	210
109	Harwich & Parkeston (10)	1–1 (4–5 p)	Walthamstow (9)	180
110	Frenford (10)	2–4	Newbury Forest (10)	51
111	Hashtag United (9)	3–1	Takeley (9)	145
112	Hoddesdon Town (9)	3–2	Langford (10)	69

Tie	Home team (tier)	Score	Away team (tier)	Att.
113	Hadley (9)	2–0	Hadleigh United (9)	138
114	Athletic Newham (10)	0–1	Wormley Rovers (10)	20
115	Northampton Sileby Rangers (10)	4–3	Bedfont & Feltham (10)	84
116	Leverstock Green (9)	0–3	A.F.C. Hayes (10)	67
117	Buckingham Athletic (10)	0–2	Holmer Green (9)	80
118	Ardley United (9)	0–2	Easington Sports (9)	70
119	Amersham Town (10)	1–4	Cogenhoe United (9)	33
121	Egham Town (9)	0–2	Raunds Town (10)	51
122	Winslow United (10)	0–3	Risborough Rangers (10)	182
123	Ampthill Town (10)	4–1	Dunstable Town (9)	171
124	Holyport (10)	0–1	FC Deportivo Galicia (10)	114
125	British Airways HEW (10)	1–1 (5–6 p)	CB Hounslow United (9)	66
126	North Greenford United (9)	5–1	Chalvey Sports (10)	83
127	Rushden & Higham United (10)	0–4	Flackwell Heath (9)	44
128	Harefield United (9)	1–1 (5–6 p)	Tring Athletic (9)	95
129	Spelthorne Sports (9)	2–4	Arlesey Town (9)	79
131	Penn & Tylers Green (10)	1–0	Burnham (9)	147
133	Rayners Lane (10)	2–4	Hanworth Villa (9)	130
134	Wembley (9)	1–2	Wellingborough Whitworth (10)	68
135	Edgware Town (9)	3–1	Irchester United (10)	48
136	Windsor (9)	0–3	Long Buckby (10)	141
137	Longlevens (9)	3–3 (4–3 p)	Tytherington Rocks (10)	79
138	Tadley Calleva (9)	4–1	Wallingford Town (10)	102
139	Wokingham & Emmbrook (10)	3–0	Cheltenham Saracens (10)	155
140	Abingdon Town (10)	0–3	Thornbury Town (10)	53
141	Cove (10)	2–2 (6–7 p)	Frimley Green (9)	104
142	Fleet Town (9)	3–1	Newent Town (10)	109
143	Clanfield (10)	2–0	Tuffley Rovers (9)	58
144	Eversley & California (10)	1–3	Long Crendon (10)	40
145	Chipping Sodbury Town (9)	0–1	Bishop's Cleeve (9)	74
146	Shrivenham (9)	1–0	Camberley Town (9)	70
147	Abingdon United (10)	0–0 (4–3 p)	Shortwood United (10)	76
148	Fairford Town (9)	0–1	Lydney Town (9)	108
151	Seaford Town (10)	W/O	Southwick (10)	
walkover for Seaford Town – Southwick withdrawn
152	Fisher (9)	4–0	Little Common (9)	163
153	Colliers Wood United (9)	7–1	Mile Oak (10)	48
154	Raynes Park Vale (9)	3–2	Rusthall (10)	77
155	Forest Hill Park (10)	2–3	Lingfield (9)	60
Match played at Lingfield.
156	Holmesdale (10)	4–2	Kent Football United (10)	42
157	Crowborough Athletic (9)	1–1 (2–4 p)	Molesey (9)	137
158	Worthing United (10)	5–4	Greenways (10)	108
159	Lydd Town (10)	1–1 (3–2 p)	Broadbridge Heath (9)	85
160	Redhill (9)	2–2 (3–1 p)	Snodland Town (10)	71
161	Horley Town (9)	4–2	Hollands & Blair (9)	106
162	Oakwood (10)	0–2	East Preston (9)	40
163	Lewisham Borough Community (10)	0–2	Balham (9)	50
164	Hailsham Town (10)	0–3	A.F.C. Varndeanians (10)	94
166	Alfold (9)	4–0	Chessington & Hook United (10)	80
167	Sheerwater (9)	2–1	Sporting Club Thamesmead (10)	91
168	K Sports (9)	2–1	Tunbridge Wells (9)	115
169	Stansfeld O&BC (10)	2–2 (8–7 p)	Knaphill (9)	65
170	Hassocks (9)	0–3	Peacehaven & Telscombe (9)	219
171	Godalming Town (10)	3–3 (4–5 p)	Shoreham (10)	154
174	Banstead Athletic (9)	2–2 (2–4 p)	Guildford City (9)	40
175	Greenwich Borough (9)	W/O	Cobham (9)	
walkover for Cobham – Greenwich Borough withdrawn
176	Wick (10)	2–1	A.F.C. Croydon Athletic (9)	35
177	Steyning Town (9)	3–1	Bagshot (10)	110
178	Storrington (10)	2–1	Bexhill United (10)	92
179	Langney Wanderers (9)	4–2	Eastbourne United (9)	177
180	Beckenham Town (9)	1–2	Littlehampton Town (10)	65
181	Punjab United (9)	1–1 (5–3 p)	Bearsted (9)	72
183	Billingshurst (10)	2–2 (7–6 p)	FC Elmstead (10)	50
184	Erith & Belvedere (9)	1–0	Loxwood (9)	80
185	Horsham YMCA (9)	4–0	Arundel (10)	82
186	Blackfield & Langley (9)	1–0	Folland Sports (10)	71
187	Amesbury Town (9)	0–3	Lymington Town (9)	80
188	Cowes Sports (9)	2–2 (5–4 p)	Devizes Town (10)	184
189	Farnham Town (10)	4–2	Downton (10)	111
190	A.F.C. Portchester (9)	3–2	Bemerton Heath Harlequins (10)	167
191	East Cowes Victoria Athletic (10)	1–2	Westbury United (9)	72
192	Hythe & Dibden (10)	0–2	Verwood Town (10)	73
194	Portland United (9)	0–4	Hamble Club (9)	95
195	Alresford Town (9)	1–1 (3–4 p)	A.F.C. Stoneham (9)	179
196	New Milton Town (10)	0–0 (6–5 p)	Andover New Street (10)	123
197	Shaftesbury (9)	0–4	Badshot Lea (9)	57
199	Baffins Milton Rovers (9)	2–2 (3–4 p)	Bashley (9)	200
200	Corsham Town (10)	1–1 (5–6 p)	Brockenhurst (9)	120
201	Romsey Town (10)	4–0	Selsey (10)	257
202	Sidmouth (10)	4–5	Cheddar (10)	84
203	Elburton Villa (10)	1–1 (10–9 p)	Saltash United (10)	102
204	Ilfracombe Town (10)	3–3 (5–3 p)	Portishead Town (10)	95
205	Odd Down (9)	2–2 (2–3 p)	Brislington (9)	70
206	Exmouth Town (9)	0–0 (5–3 p)	Mousehole (10)	252
207	Torpoint Athletic (10)	3–2	Porthleven (10)	100
208	Launceston (10)	0–4	Axminster Town (10)	66
209	Wellington (Somerset) (9)	2–2 (4–5 p)	Hengrove Athletic (10)	68
210	Newquay (10)	3–6	Street (9)	120
211	Bridport (9)	4–3	A.F.C. St Austell (10)	134
212	St Blazey (10)	4–2	Bishops Lydeard (10)	101
213	Radstock Town (10)	1–1 (3–5 p)	Longwell Green Sports (10)	70
214	Bodmin Town (10)	2–3	Keynsham Town (9)	90
215	Callington Town (10)	0–3	Ivybridge Town (10)	85
216	Welton Rovers (10)	4–1	Cullompton Rangers (10)	70
217	Shepton Mallet (9)	3–1	Bishop Sutton (10)	157
218	Wells City (10)	6–0	Godolphin Atlantic (10)	77
219	Brixham (10)	2–4	Newton Abbot Spurs (10)	82
220	Camelford (10)	5–1	Almondsbury (10)	73
221	Liskeard Athletic (10)	0–3	Millbrook (10)	54
150	Walton & Hersham (10)	3–1	Meridian (10)	140
Sunday 20 September 2020
107	Holland (10)	2–0	Enfield (9)	150
99	West Essex (9)	8–1	Haverhill Borough (10)	71
182	Kennington (10)	1–0	Erith Town (9)	190
47	Hinckley (10)	0–2	Studley (10)	242
97	Hackney Wick (10)	0–1	Halstead Town (10)	93
120	London Tigers (10)	0–5	Northampton ON Chenecks (9)	60
165	Croydon (10)	1–2	Sheppey United (9)	167
Match played at Glebe F.C.
172	Epsom & Ewell (10)	4–0	Bridon Ropes (10)	101
Tie ordered to be replayed due to Epsom & Ewell fielding an ineligible player.
173	Westside (10)	1–3	Abbey Rangers (9)	78
193	Newport (IOW) (10)	2–2 (5–3 p)	Calne Town (10)	151
Monday 21 September 2020
48	Boldmere St. Michaels (9)	P-P	Brocton (10)	
Saturday 26 September 2020
48	Boldmere St. Michaels (9)	4–0	Brocton (10)	121
Tuesday 13 October 2020
172	Epsom & Ewell (10)	2–1	Bridon Ropes (10)	68

== Second qualifying round ==
The draw was made on 18 August 2020. Fixtures and match results taken from thefa.com website.

Tie	Home team (tier)	Score	Away team (tier)	Att.
Friday 9 October 2020
92	Edgware Town (9)	4–1	Tring Athletic (9)	146
29	A.F.C. Liverpool (10)	3–2	Maine Road (10)	119
78	West Essex (9)	3–4	Haverhill Rovers (9)	91
85	May & Baker (10)	2–2 (6–5 p)	Little Oakley (10)	105
105	Sandhurst Town (10)	3–1	Long Crendon (10)	65
Saturday 10 October 2020
1	Esh Winning (10)	1–2	A.F.C. Blackpool (10)	91
2	Newcastle University (10)	4–1	Thornaby (9)	90
3	Holker Old Boys (10)	2–1	Crook Town (10)	147
4	Silsden (9)	3–5	Guisborough Town (9)	215
5	Thackley (9)	0–1	Harrogate Railway Athletic (10)	181
6	Redcar Athletic (10)	2–1	Whickham (9)	255
7	Heaton Stannington (10)	1–2	Padiham (9)	150
8	North Shields (9)	3–2	Northallerton Town (9)	150
9	Nelson (10)	P–P	Ashington (9)	
10	Newton Aycliffe (9)	2–0	Billingham Synthonia (10)	146
11	Brandon United (10)	1–2	Penrith (9)	50
12	Jarrow (10)	3–2	Birtley Town (10)	114
13	Sunderland Ryhope CA (9)	2–3	Shildon (9)	150
14	Campion (10)	0–4	Ryhope Colliery Welfare (9)	90
15	Garforth Town (9)	1–1 (5–6 p)	Seaham Red Star (9)	238
16	Avro (9)	0–3	Abbey Hey (10)	266
17	Warrington Rylands (9)	6–0	Goole (9)	117
18	Penistone Church (9)	2–1	Wythenshawe Amateurs (10)	280
19	North Ferriby (10)	3–2	Northwich Victoria (9)	300
20	Hallam (10)	3–1	Parkgate (10)	300
21	Hemsworth Miners Welfare (9)	3–0	Nostell Miners Welfare (10)	108
Match played at Nostell Miners Welfare.
23	West Didsbury & Chorlton (10)	0–2	Charnock Richard (9)	300
24	Bacup Borough (10)	1–1 (4–3 p)	Stockport Town (10)	92
25	Cheadle Town (10)	4–0	Dronfield Town (10)	141
26	Glasshoughton Welfare (10)	1–3	Irlam (9)	86
27	1874 Northwich (9)	3–0	Selby Town (10)	180
28	Cammell Laird (10)	0–3	Maltby Main (9)	96
30	Bootle (9)	W/O	Shelley Community (10)	
Bootle awarded a walkover due to Shelley Community withdrawing from the North West Counties Football League.
31	Liversedge (9)	P–P	Ashton Athletic (9)	
32	New Mills (10)	P–P	Winterton Rangers (10)	
33	A.F.C. Darwen (10)	0–2	Runcorn Town (9)	238
35	Romulus (9)	P–P	Leicester Road (10)	
36	Pershore Town (10)	0–1	A.F.C. Bridgnorth (10)	127
37	Highgate United (9)	1–5	Racing Club Warwick (9)	115
38	Rugby Town (9)	6–1	Ellesmere Rangers (10)	240
39	Winsford United (9)	1–1 (13–14 p)	Boldmere St. Michaels (9)	173
40	Uttoxeter Town (10)	1–3	Stourport Swifts (9)	120
41	Rocester (10)	P–P	Bewdley Town (10)	
42	Dudley Sports (10)	2–1	Littleton (10)	45
43	Studley (10)	3–1	Darlaston Town (10)	77
44	Coventry Sphinx (9)	2–0	Shifnal Town (10)	91
45	Eccleshall (10)	P–P	Hanley Town (9)	
46	Dudley Town (10)	0–2	Stone Old Alleynians (10)	95
47	GNP Sports (10)	1–2	Gresley Rovers (9)	277
Match played at Gresley Rovers.
48	Tividale (9)	0–2	Stapenhill (10)	129
49	Cadbury Athletic (10)	1–0	Lichfield City (10)	72
Match played at Lichfield City.
50	Abbey Hulton United (10)	3–1	Ashby Ivanhoe (10)	97
51	Anstey Nomads (9)	P–P	Boston Town (9)	
52	Rainworth Miners Welfare (10)	3–3 (4–3 p)	Gedling Miners Welfare (10)	77
53	West Bridgford (10)	2–2 (2–4 p)	Harrowby United (10)	95
54	Sherwood Colliery (10)	1–3	Aylestone Park (10)	87
55	Melton Town (10)	8–1	Birstall United (10)	132
56	Long Eaton United (9)	4–1	Selston (9)	105
57	Quorn (9)	5–2	Kirby Muxloe (10)	130
58	Radford (10)	3–3 (4–3 p)	Ollerton Town (10)	115
59	Harborough Town (9)	3–5	Leicester Nirvana (9)	162
61	Lutterworth Athletic (10)	0–3	Deeping Rangers (9)	115
62	Bourne Town (10)	0–4	Loughborough University (9)	116
63	Shirebrook Town (10)	1–1 (5–4 p)	Ingles (10)	121
64	Borrowash Victoria (10)	0–3	Skegness Town (10)	196
65	Swaffham Town (9)	2–2 (3–4 p)	Fakenham Town (10)	102
66	Lakenheath (10)	1–3	Mildenhall Town (9)	137
67	Whittlesey Athletic (10)	2–0	Debenham LC (10)	90
68	Thetford Town (9)	1–2	Norwich United (9)	109
69	Gorleston (9)	3–2	Downham Town (10)	168
70	Great Yarmouth Town (10)	1–3	Mulbarton Wanderers (10)	118
71	Sheringham (10)	0–1	Walsham-le-Willows (9)	180
72	March Town United (10)	2–2 (5–6 p)	Norwich CBS (10)	100
73	Ipswich Wanderers (10)	1–0	London Colney (9)	120
75	Potton United (9)	1–3	Clapton (9)	78
76	Hashtag United (9)	5–0	Wormley Rovers (10)	300
77	Park View (10)	2–2 (2–4 p)	Cockfosters (9)	
79	Whitton United (9)	P–P	White Ensign (10)	
80	Hadley (9)	1–1 (8–7 p)	Enfield Borough (10)	145
81	Hoddesdon Town (9)	2–1	Woodford Town (9)	68
83	New Salamis (10)	3–0	Cornard United (10)	45
84	Holland (10)	P–P	Colney Heath (9)	
86	Newbury Forest (10)	2–2 (4–3 p)	Burnham Ramblers (10)	41
87	Ilford (9)	1–1 (4–3 p)	Benfleet (10)	90
88	Walthamstow (9)	3–1	Maccabi London Lions (10)	189
89	Crawley Green (9)	6–4	Wellingborough Whitworth (10)	20
90	Flackwell Heath (9)	3–0	Desborough Town (9)	84
91	CB Hounslow United (9)	2–2 (4–2 p)	Easington Sports (9)	70

Tie	Home team (tier)	Score	Away team (tier)	Att.
93	A.F.C. Hayes (10)	2–0	Penn & Tylers Green (10)	77
Match played at Penn & Tylers Green.
95	Holmer Green (9)	1–4	Bugbrooke St Michaels (10)	52
96	Raunds Town (10)	1–4	Risborough Rangers (10)	78
97	Hanworth Villa (9)	4–0	FC Deportivo Galicia (10)	116
98	Arlesey Town (9)	2–3	Northampton Sileby Rangers (10)	92
99	Long Buckby (10)	2–3	Ampthill Town (10)	111
100	Broadfields United (9)	1–2	Milton Keynes Irish (10)	63
101	Oxhey Jets (9)	1–3	North Greenford United (9)	76
102	Rothwell Corinthians (9)	3–0	St. Panteleimon (10)	72
103	Cogenhoe United (9)	2–1	Harpenden Town (9)	61
104	Brimscombe & Thrupp (9)	5–0	A.F.C. Aldermaston (10)	109
106	Stonehouse Town (10)	0–1	Royal Wootton Bassett Town (9)	124
107	Longlevens (9)	2–0	Wokingham & Emmbrook (10)	67
108	Bishop's Cleeve (9)	1–0	Malmesbury Victoria (10)	129
109	Milton United (10)	3–1	Lydney Town (9)	91
110	Clanfield (10)	3–2	Fleet Spurs (10)	81
111	Tadley Calleva (9)	1–2	Frimley Green (9)	76
112	Thornbury Town (10)	1–4	Abingdon United (10)	149
113	Woodley United (10)	2–3	Reading City (9)	207
114	Fleet Town (9)	3–1	Shrivenham (9)	160
115	Rochester United (10)	0–4	Sutton Athletic (10)	68
116	Worthing United (10)	4–3	Canterbury City (9)	122
117	Steyning Town (9)	3–1	Lingfield (9)	105
118	Holmesdale (10)	2–0	A.F.C. Varndeanians (10)	37
120	Sheerwater (9)	2–1	Horsham YMCA (9)	97
121	Wick (10)	0–2	Saltdean United (9)	60
122	Erith & Belvedere (9)	3–0	Colliers Wood United (9)	146
123	Seaford Town (10)	2–2 (6–5 p)	Storrington (10)	111
125	East Preston (9)	0–2	Fisher (9)	114
126	Alfold (9)	2–4	Stansfeld O&BC (10)	61
127	Littlehampton Town (10)	3–1	Lordswood (9)	106
128	Walton & Hersham (10)	1–0	K Sports (9)	129
129	Peacehaven & Telscombe (9)	2–2 (4–3 p)	Balham (9)	208
130	Abbey Rangers (9)	1–1 (3–4 p)	Guildford City (9)	105
131	Punjab United (9)	2–3	Horley Town (9)	62
132	Billingshurst (10)	0–3	Jersey Bulls (10)	115
134	Redhill (9)	0–1	Raynes Park Vale (9)	68
135	Crawley Down Gatwick (9)	1–1 (3–5 p)	Cobham (9)	116
136	Sheppey United (9)	6–0	Molesey (9)	300
137	New Milton Town (10)	4–0	Totton & Eling (10)	114
138	Fareham Town (9)	3–3 (3–0 p)	Badshot Lea (9)	172
139	Farnham Town (10)	0–0 (5–6 p)	Petersfield Town (10)	263
140	Romsey Town (10)	1–5	Ringwood Town (10)	236
141	Bournemouth (9)	2–2 (5–4 p)	Blackfield & Langley (9)	152
142	Cowes Sports (9)	1–4	Pagham (9)	169
143	Horndean (9)	0–1	Westbury United (9)	90
144	Whitchurch United (10)	2–1	Verwood Town (10)	93
145	Newport (IOW) (10)	1–0	Alton (10)	111
146	Lymington Town (9)	2–0	Hamble Club (9)	127
147	Ash United (10)	2–6	Bashley (9)	82
148	Brockenhurst (9)	3–2	A.F.C. Stoneham (9)	173
149	United Services Portsmouth (10)	2–1	A.F.C. Portchester (9)	300
Match played at A.F.C. Portchester.
150	Street (9)	2–0	Hengrove Athletic (10)	105
151	Cheddar (10)	3–2	Ivybridge Town (10)	77
152	Bridport (9)	1–3	Ilfracombe Town (10)	149
153	Camelford (10)	0–0 (6–5 p)	Wadebridge Town (10)	133
154	Oldland Abbotonians (10)	0–5	Keynsham Town (9)	60
155	Axminster Town (10)	0–2	Clevedon Town (9)	107
156	Shepton Mallet (9)	5–1	Torrington (10)	160
157	Helston Athletic (10)	1–0	Torpoint Athletic (10)	73
158	Millbrook (10)	2–1	Hallen (9)	146
159	Sherborne Town (10)	W/O	Exmouth Town (9)	
Sherborne Town awarded a walkover due to an Exmouth Town player testing positive for COVID-19, forcing them to forfeit.
160	Cadbury Heath (9)	W/O	Ashton & Backwell United (10)	
Ashton & Backwell United awarded a walkover due to Cadbury Heath players testing positive for COVID-19, forcing them to forfeit.
161	Welton Rovers (10)	1–0	Elburton Villa (10)	112
162	St Blazey (10)	3–0	Brislington (9)	203
163	Newton Abbot Spurs (10)	3–2	Crediton United (10)	126
164	Longwell Green Sports (10)	2–1	Bovey Tracey (10)	45
165	Wells City (10)	3–0	Bristol Telephones (10)	71
Sunday 11 October 2020
124	Kennington (10)	7–0	Shoreham (10)	192
22	Barnton (10)	4–0	Swallownest (10)	203
34	Chelmsley Town (10)	0–1	Paget Rangers (10)	320
60	Belper United (10)	2–1	Kimberley Miners Welfare (10)	258
74	Coggeshall United (10)	3–2	Sporting Bengal United (9)	70
82	Baldock Town (9)	3–2	Halstead Town (10)	128
94	Burton Park Wanderers (10)	2–2 (6–5 p)	Northampton ON Chenecks (9)	126
119	Tooting Bec (10)	2–2 (4–3 p)	Lydd Town (10)	174
Saturday 17 October 2020
9	Nelson (10)	1–4	Ashington (9)	101
31	Liversedge (9)	3–1	Ashton Athletic (9)	221
32	New Mills (10)	2–1	Winterton Rangers (10)	165
35	Romulus (9)	0–0 (7–6 p)	Leicester Road (10)	92
41	Rocester (10)	1–3	Bewdley Town (10)	159
45	Eccleshall (10)	0–7	Hanley Town (9)	176
51	Anstey Nomads (9)	3–1	Boston Town (9)	136
79	Whitton United (9)	1–2	White Ensign (10)	
84	Holland (10)	0–0 (3–4 p)	Colney Heath (9)	
Sunday 18 October 2020
133	Epsom & Ewell (10)	1–1 (3–2 p)	Langney Wanderers (9)	130

== First round proper ==
The draw was made on 12 October 2020. Fixtures and match results taken from thefa.com website.

Tie	Home team (tier)	Score	Away team (tier)	Att.
Friday 30 October 2020
72	Walton & Hersham (10)	3–0	Peacehaven & Telscombe (9)	250
96	United Services Portsmouth (10)	P–P	Bournemouth (9)	
Saturday 31 October 2020
1	Redcar Athletic (10)	1–2	Holker Old Boys (10)	197
2	Penistone Church (9)	3–0	A.F.C. Liverpool (10)	266
3	Abbey Hey (10)	P–P	Hemsworth Miners Welfare (9)	
4	Jarrow (10)	0–0 (3–0 p)	Yorkshire Amateur (9)	134
5	Liversedge (9)	5–2	Newcastle Benfield (9)	300
6	Charnock Richard (9)	P–P	Ashington (9)	
7	Warrington Rylands (9)	2–0	Padiham (9)	152
8	Guisborough Town (9)	2–0	Runcorn Town (9)	187
9	Lower Breck (10)	3–2	Newton Aycliffe (9)	118
10	Maltby Main (9)	3–1	Newcastle University (10)	153
11	Wythenshawe Town (10)	2–2 (4–5 p)	North Ferriby (10)	182
12	Hallam (10)	P–P	A.F.C. Blackpool (10)	
13	Bridlington Town (9)	2–2 (4–5 p)	North Shields (9)	
14	Bootle (9)	0–2	Shildon (9)	196
15	Irlam (9)	0–2	Seaham Red Star (9)	217
16	Ryhope Colliery Welfare (9)	3–0	Penrith (9)	59
17	Cheadle Town (10)	0–2	New Mills (10)	213
19	1874 Northwich (9)	2–1	Harrogate Railway Athletic (10)	210
20	Bewdley Town (10)	2–2 (4–3 p)	Stapenhill (10)	115
21	Shepshed Dynamo (9)	3–2	Melton Town (10)	189
22	Coventry Sphinx (9)	6–1	Heanor Town (10)	
23	Aylestone Park (10)	3–3 (4–3 p)	Lye Town (9)	106
24	Grimsby Borough (9)	1–0	Quorn (9)	123
25	Hanley Town (9)	P–P	Deeping Rangers (9)	
26	Harrowby United (10)	0–1	A.F.C. Bridgnorth (10)	214
27	Racing Club Warwick (9)	1–1 (2–4 p)	Abbey Hulton United (10)	94
Match played at Abbey Hulton United.
28	Paget Rangers (10)	0–4	Radford (10)	213
29	Shirebrook Town (10)	0–3	Boldmere St. Michaels (9)	84
30	Dudley Sports (10)	2–1	Rugby Town (9)	127
31	Loughborough University (9)	4–0	Cadbury Athletic (10)	112
32	Rainworth Miners Welfare (10)	3–2	Belper United (10)	142
33	Anstey Nomads (9)	P–P	Leicester Nirvana (9)	
34	Stourport Swifts (9)	P–P	Skegness Town (10)	
35	Congleton Town (9)	5–0	Gresley Rovers (9)	300
36	Studley (10)	P–P	Long Eaton United (9)	
37	Malvern Town (10)	3–1	Rothwell Corinthians (9)	252
38	Westfields (9)	2–2 (3–2 p)	Romulus (9)	119
39	Stone Old Alleynians (10)	3–2	A.F.C. Mansfield (9)	75
40	Gorleston (9)	4–2	Baldock Town (9)	149
41	Cockfosters (9)	P–P	Cogenhoe United (9)	
42	Ilford (9)	4–1	FC Clacton (9)	
43	Bugbrooke St Michaels (10)	1–2	Stanway Rovers (9)	83
44	Ampthill Town (10)	1–1 (4–2 p)	Walthamstow (9)	280
45	Wellingborough Town (9)	2–0	Haverhill Rovers (9)	
46	Norwich United (9)	W/O	White Ensign (10)	
Norwich United awarded a walkover due to four White Ensign players testing positive for COVID-19, forcing them to forfeit.
47	Whittlesey Athletic (10)	0–6	Mildenhall Town (9)	
48	Colney Heath (9)	3–1	New Salamis (10)	192
49	Fakenham Town (10)	2–1	Crawley Green (9)	145
50	Newbury Forest (10)	P–P	May & Baker (10)	
51	Norwich CBS (10)	3–2	Ipswich Wanderers (10)	59
52	Milton Keynes Irish (10)	2–0	Stansted (9)	106
53	Northampton Sileby Rangers (10)	2–2 (4–5 p)	Burton Park Wanderers (10)	125
54	Mulbarton Wanderers (10)	4–0	Newport Pagnell Town (9)	100
56	Walsham-le-Willows (9)	5–1	Hoddesdon Town (9)	209
57	Raynes Park Vale (9)	P–P	Sheerwater (9)	
58	Sandhurst Town (10)	2–6	North Greenford United (9)	
59	Jersey Bulls (10)	W/O	Cobham (9)	
Cobham awarded a walkover due to travel restrictions forcing Jersey Bulls to forfeit.
60	Risborough Rangers (10)	P–P	Erith & Belvedere (9)	
61	Fleet Town (9)	0–2	Littlehampton Town (10)	185
62	Frimley Green (9)	0–2	Flackwell Heath (9)	
63	Clapton (9)	1–1 (0–3 p)	Petersfield Town (10)	55
Petersfield Town removed from competition for fielding an ineligible player.
64	Saltdean United (9)	3–1	Epsom & Ewell (10)	

Tie	Home team (tier)	Score	Away team (tier)	Att.
65	Eastbourne Town (9)	0–3	Southall (9)	300
66	Tooting Bec (10)	2–3	Guildford City (9)	
67	Worthing United (10)	0–3	Edgware Town (9)	116
Tie ordered to be replayed due to Edgware Town fielding an ineligible player.
68	Steyning Town (9)	9–1	Seaford Town (10)	168
69	Sutton Athletic (10)	0–2	Sheppey United (9)	170
70	Newhaven (9)	4–1	Ascot United (9)	152
71	Kennington (10)	1–1 (5–4 p)	Fisher (9)	300
73	Stansfeld O&BC (10)	P–P	A.F.C. Hayes (10)	
74	Welling Town (9)	1–6	Hanworth Villa (9)	63
75	Hadley (9)	2–1	Pagham (9)	122
76	Holmesdale (10)	2–4	A.F.C. Uckfield Town (9)	89
77	CB Hounslow United (9)	1–5	Horley Town (9)	
Match played at Horley Town.
78	Reading City (9)	0–1	Lancing (9)	81
79	Cheddar (10)	P–P	Ashton & Backwell United (10)	
80	Bridgwater Town (9)	5–0	Welton Rovers (10)	173
81	Keynsham Town (9)	0–4	Bashley (9)	142
82	Bishop's Cleeve (9)	P–P	Shepton Mallet (9)	
83	Clevedon Town (9)	2–1	Whitchurch United (10)	
84	Brockenhurst (9)	P–P	Street (9)	
85	Fareham Town (9)	P–P	Roman Glass St. George (9)	
86	St Blazey (10)	2–2 (3–4 p)	Helston Athletic (10)	271
87	New Milton Town (10)	1–1 (4–1 p)	Clanfield (10)	135
88	Falmouth Town (10)	3–1	Abingdon United (10)	281
89	Millbrook (10)	P–P	Sherborne Town (10)	
90	Newton Abbot Spurs (10)	3–1	Ringwood Town (10)	171
91	Brimscombe & Thrupp (9)	P–P	Longwell Green Sports (10)	
92	Royal Wootton Bassett Town (9)	4–0	Camelford (10)	142
93	Cribbs (9)	4–3	Newport (IOW) (10)	
94	Hamworthy United (9)	4–0	Ilfracombe Town (10)	152
95	Wells City (10)	2–2 (4–3 p)	Westbury United (9)	113
97	Milton United (10)	2–2 (4–5 p)	Longlevens (9)	
98	Lymington Town (9)	1–2	Tavistock (9)	131
Sunday 1 November 2020
18	Barnton (10)	P–P	Bacup Borough (10)	
55	Coggeshall United (10)	0–2	Hashtag United (9)	209
Tuesday 3 November 2020
33	Anstey Nomads (9)	P–P	Leicester Nirvana (9)	
36	Studley (10)	1–4	Long Eaton United (9)	48
41	Cockfosters (9)	1–3	Cogenhoe United (9)	113
50	Newbury Forest (10)	P–P	May & Baker (10)	
60	Risborough Rangers (10)	0–0 (4–2 p)	Erith & Belvedere (9)	138
82	Bishop's Cleeve (9)	6–3	Shepton Mallet (9)	
91	Brimscombe & Thrupp (9)	4–2	Longwell Green Sports (10)	78
Wednesday 4 November 2020
50	Newbury Forest (10)	0–4	May & Baker (10)	
Match played at Barking F.C.
57	Raynes Park Vale (9)	1–0	Sheerwater (9)	95
96	United Services Portsmouth (10)	3–1	Bournemouth (9)	184
Match played at A.F.C. Portchester
Saturday 5 December 2020
3	Abbey Hey (10)	3–1	Hemsworth Miners Welfare (9)	0
6	Charnock Richard (9)	W/O	Ashington (9)	
Charnock Richard awarded a walkover due to Ashington refusing to travel out of a Tier 3 area.
12	Hallam (10)	4–3	A.F.C. Blackpool (10)	0
25	Hanley Town (9)	W/O	Deeping Rangers (9)	
Hanley Town awarded a walkover due to Deeping Rangers refusing to travel out of a Tier 3 area.
33	Anstey Nomads (9)	1–0	Leicester Nirvana (9)	0
34	Stourport Swifts (9)	W/O	Skegness Town (10)	
Stourport Swifts awarded a walkover due to Skegness Town refusing to travel out of a Tier 3 area.
67	Worthing United (10)	3–1	Edgware Town (9)	
79	Cheddar (10)	2–1	Ashton & Backwell United (10)	
84	Brockenhurst (9)	P–P	Street (9)	
85	Fareham Town (9)	4–1	Roman Glass St. George (9)	
89	Millbrook (10)	3–1	Sherborne Town (10)	
Sunday 6 December 2020
18	Barnton (10)	1–0	Bacup Borough (10)	
73	Stansfeld O&BC (10)	2–2 (4–3 p)	A.F.C. Hayes (10)	
84	Brockenhurst (9)	2–2 (5–3 p)	Street (9)	113

== Second round proper ==
The draw was made on 2 November 2020. Originally scheduled for 28 November 2020, the second round proper ties were postponed due to the COVID-19 pandemic.

Tie	Home team (tier)	Score	Away team (tier)	Att.
Saturday 5 December 2020
1	Guisborough Town (9)	1–4	Liversedge (9)	0
2	Hebburn Town (9)	P–P	North Shields (9)	
3	New Mills (10)	2–2 (4–5 p)	Congleton Town (9)	191
Match played at Congleton Town.
4	Stockton Town (9)	4–2	Charnock Richard (9)	0
5	Holker Old Boys (10)	0–1	Vauxhall Motors (10)	136
6	Consett (9)	5–0	Maltby Main (9)	0
7	Jarrow (10)	P–P	Warrington Rylands (9)	
8	Longridge Town (9)	P–P	Penistone Church (9)	
12	North Ferriby (10)	2–1	Lower Breck (10)	0
13	1874 Northwich (9)	1–4	West Auckland Town (9)	281
14	Radford (10)	3–1	Bewdley Town (10)	0
15	Long Eaton United (9)	3–2	Stone Old Alleynians (10)	0
16	Atherstone Town (10)	0–1	Malvern Town (10)	0
17	Lutterworth Town (9)	3–3 (4–5 p)	Westfields (9)	0
18	Dudley Sports (10)	1–1 (2–3 p)	Coventry Sphinx (9)	0
19	Hanley Town (9)	2–1	Loughborough University (9)	0
20	Walsall Wood (9)	P–P	A.F.C. Bridgnorth (10)	
22	Stourport Swifts (9)	P–P	Grimsby Borough (9)	
23	Shepshed Dynamo (9)	3–2	Worcester City (9)	0
24	Boldmere St. Michaels (9)	3–4	Newark (9)	0
25	Sporting Khalsa (9)	4–1	Aylestone Park (10)	0
26	Coventry United (9)	3–2	Abbey Hulton United (10)	0
27	Ilford (9)	2–4	Colney Heath (9)	
28	Norwich United (9)	W/O	Burton Park Wanderers (10)	
Norwich United awarded a walkover due to Burton Park Wanderers failing to fulfil the fixture.
29	Wroxham (9)	3–3 (3–4 p)	Milton Keynes Irish (10)	230
30	Mulbarton Wanderers (10)	P–P	Cogenhoe United (9)	
31	Gorleston (9)	W/O	Kirkley & Pakefield (9)	
Gorleston awarded a walkover due to Kirkley & Pakefield failing to fulfil the fixture.
32	Fakenham Town (10)	0–0 (4–3 p)	Hashtag United (9)	
33	Wellingborough Town (9)	1–0	Woodbridge Town (9)	151
34	Stowmarket Town (9)	5–0	Eynesbury Rovers (9)	176
35	Stanway Rovers (9)	1–1 (2–4 p)	Ampthill Town (10)	
36	Norwich CBS (10)	P–P	May & Baker (10)	
37	Mildenhall Town (9)	W/O	Leighton Town (9)	
Leighton Town awarded a walkover due to Mildenhall Town failing to fulfil the fixture.
38	Hadley (9)	4–1	Raynes Park Vale (9)	179
40	North Greenford United (9)	2–1	Walsham-le-Willows (9)	
41	Hanworth Villa (9)	2–2 (6–5 p)	Corinthian (9)	
42	Newhaven (9)	2–2 (1–4 p)	Binfield (9)	129
43	Saltdean United (9)	2–2 (2–3 p)	Deal Town (9)	

Tie	Home team (tier)	Score	Away team (tier)	Att.
44	Horley Town (9)	3–5	Chatham Town (9)	98
45	Cobham (9)	1–0	Risborough Rangers (10)	
46	Steyning Town (9)	1–6	Walton & Hersham (10)	105
47	Littlehampton Town (10)	3–3 (5–4 p)	Sheppey United (9)	204
50	Glebe (9)	0–2	Kennington (10)	
51	A.F.C. Uckfield Town (9)	2–4	Guildford City (9)	116
52	Plymouth Parkway (9)	3–1	Newton Abbot Spurs (10)	272
53	Christchurch (9)	P–P	Cribbs (9)	
56	Bradford Town (9)	2–3	Brimscombe & Thrupp (9)	161
57	Wells City (10)	1–2	Buckland Athletic (9)	71
58	New Milton Town (10)	P–P	Longlevens (9)	
60	Bridgwater Town (9)	2–1	Royal Wootton Bassett Town (9)	191
61	Clapton (9)	2–1	Hamworthy United (9)	81
Match played at Aveley F.C.
63	Falmouth Town (10)	P–P	Bishop's Cleeve (9)	
64	Clevedon Town (9)	4–3	Bitton (9)	0
Sunday 6 December 2020
48	Sutton Common Rovers (9)	4–0	Southall (9)	
Wednesday 9 December 2020
20	Walsall Wood (9)	3–0	A.F.C. Bridgnorth (10)	0
Saturday 12 December 2020
2	Hebburn Town (9)	3–2	North Shields (9)	150
7	Jarrow (10)	1–1 (4–5 p)	Warrington Rylands (9)	79
8	Longridge Town (9)	1–1 (6–5 p)	Penistone Church (9)	0
Match played at Penistone Church.
9	Ryhope Colliery Welfare (9)	1–0	Abbey Hey (10)	42
10	Barnton (10)	P–P	Seaham Red Star (9)	
11	Hallam (10)	0–2	Shildon (9)	150
21	Anstey Nomads (9)	1–0	Rainworth Miners Welfare (10)	60
22	Stourport Swifts (9)	3–1	Grimsby Borough (9)	173
30	Mulbarton Wanderers (10)	5–0	Cogenhoe United (9)	
36	Norwich CBS (10)	2–1	May & Baker (10)	
39	Lancing (9)	3–0	Worthing United (10)	300
49	Stansfeld O&BC (10)	0–3	Flackwell Heath (9)	152
53	Christchurch (9)	2–1	Cribbs (9)	144
54	United Services Portsmouth (10)	2–1	Brockenhurst (9)	104
55	Millbrook (10)	2–0	Bashley (9)	
58	New Milton Town (10)	2–0	Longlevens (9)	
59	Helston Athletic (10)	0–2	Fareham Town (9)	119
62	Tavistock (9)	6–1	Cheddar (10)	
63	Falmouth Town (10)	2–1	Bishop's Cleeve (9)	300
Saturday 19 December 2020
10	Barnton (10)	0–4	Seaham Red Star (9)	247

== Third round proper ==
The draw was made on 7 December 2020 with ties scheduled to be played 19 December 2020.

Tie	Home team (tier)	Score	Away team (tier)	Att.
Saturday 19 December 2020
1	Longridge Town (9)	1–2	Warrington Rylands (9)	91
Match played at Warrington Rylands.
3	Ryhope Colliery Welfare (9)	0–0 (3–4 p)	Liversedge (9)	122
4	Hebburn Town (9)	2–2 (5–3 p)	Vauxhall Motors (10)	150
5	Stockton Town (9)	1–3	Shildon (9)	150
6	Consett (9)	1–2	West Auckland Town (9)	150
7	Stourport Swifts (9)	4–3	Shepshed Dynamo (9)	280
8	Long Eaton United (9)	2–0	Hanley Town (9)	92
9	Newark (9)	1–1 (7–8 p)	Walsall Wood (9)	150
10	Radford (10)	0–5	Westfields (9)	96
11	Coventry Sphinx (9)	1–2	Anstey Nomads (9)	
12	Malvern Town (10)	5–5 (6–5 p)	Sporting Khalsa (9)	300
13	Congleton Town (9)	1–1 (4–3 p)	Coventry United (9)	264
14	Fakenham Town (10)	2–2 (4–2 p)	Milton Keynes Irish (10)	260
15	Wellingborough Town (9)	2–1	Norwich United (9)	145
16	Leighton Town (9)	4–2	Gorleston (9)	159
17	Stowmarket Town (9)	2–0	Norwich CBS (10)	282
18	Mulbarton Wanderers (10)	1–0	Ampthill Town (10)	92
19	Hadley (9)	0–0 (4–1 p)	Colney Heath (9)	150
20	Clapton (9)	0–5	Cobham (9)	
21	Guildford City (9)	P–P	Walton & Hersham (10)	
22	Kennington (10)	1–1 (1–4 p)	Sutton Common Rovers (9)	150
23	Deal Town (9)	P–P	Binfield (9)	
24	Littlehampton Town (10)	2–2 (4–5 p)	Hanworth Villa (9)	200
25	Chatham Town (9)	0–1	Flackwell Heath (9)	150

Tie	Home team (tier)	Score	Away team (tier)	Att.
26	Lancing (9)	2–2 (5–3 p)	North Greenford United (9)	155
27	Christchurch (9)	P–P	Falmouth Town (10)	
28	Clevedon Town (9)	2–0	New Milton Town (10)	171
29	United Services Portsmouth (10)	3–2	Millbrook (10)	
30	Buckland Athletic (9)	P–P	Tavistock (9)	
31	Plymouth Parkway (9)	P–P	Fareham Town (9)	
32	Brimscombe & Thrupp (9)	P–P	Bridgwater Town (9)	
Saturday 26 December 2020
21	Guildford City (9)	P–P	Walton & Hersham (10)	
30	Buckland Athletic (9)	0–4	Tavistock (9)	202
Sunday 27 December 2020
23	Deal Town (9)	P–P	Binfield (9)	
27	Christchurch (9)	1–1 (6–5 p)	Falmouth Town (10)	263
31	Plymouth Parkway (9)	P–P	Fareham Town (9)	
32	Brimscombe & Thrupp (9)	2–2 (4–5 p)	Bridgwater Town (9)	141
Match played at Cirencester Town F.C.
Tuesday 29 December 2020
2	North Ferriby (10)	2–2 (7–6 p)	Seaham Red Star (9)	150
Tie ordered to be replayed due to North Ferriby fielding an ineligible player.
Saturday 10 April 2021
2	North Ferriby (10)	1–0	Seaham Red Star (9)	0
21	Guildford City (9)	1–1 (2–4 p)	Walton & Hersham (10)	0
23	Deal Town (9)	1–4	Binfield (9)	0
31	Plymouth Parkway (9)	5–2	Fareham Town (9)	0
Match played at Devon FA.

== Fourth round proper ==
The draw was made on 21 December 2020. Originally scheduled for 9 January 2021, the fourth round proper ties were postponed due to the COVID-19 pandemic. On 11 March 2021, it was announced that the ties would take place on 17 April 2021.

Tie	Home team (tier)	Score	Away team (tier)	Att.
Friday 16 April 2021
4	Stourport Swifts (9)	1–2	Walsall Wood (9)	0
16	Bridgwater Town (9)	0–1	Tavistock (9)	0
Saturday 17 April 2021
1	Shildon (9)	0–0 (4–5 p)	Warrington Rylands (9)	0
2	North Ferriby (10)	4–0	West Auckland Town (9)	0
North Ferriby removed from competition for fielding an ineligible player.
3	Hebburn Town (9)	2–1	Liversedge (9)	0
5	Congleton Town (9)	1–0	Malvern Town (10)	0
6	Long Eaton United (9)	1–1 (5–4 p)	Westfields (9)	0

Tie	Home team (tier)	Score	Away team (tier)	Att.
7	Anstey Nomads (9)	4–2	Wellingborough Town (9)	0
8	Mulbarton Wanderers (10)	0–0 (1–3 p)	Hanworth Villa (9)	0
9	Leighton Town (9)	2–1	Walton & Hersham (10)	0
10	Lancing (9)	1–1 (2–4 p)	Flackwell Heath (9)	0
11	Fakenham Town (10)	2–2 (1–4 p)	Binfield (9)	0
12	Stowmarket Town (9)	W/O	Cobham (9)	
Cobham awarded a walkover due to Stowmarket Town withdrawing from the competition for financial reasons.
13	Sutton Common Rovers (9)	1–3	Hadley (9)	
14	Plymouth Parkway (9)	2–1	Clevedon Town (9)	
15	United Services Portsmouth (10)	1–1 (4-1 p)	Christchurch (9)	0

== Fifth round proper ==
The draw was made on 12 April 2021. Originally scheduled for 6 February 2021, the fifth round proper ties were postponed due to the COVID-19 pandemic. On 11 March 2021, it was announced that the ties would take place on 24 April 2021.

Tie	Home team (tier)	Score	Away team (tier)	Att.
Saturday 24 April 2021
1	Hebburn Town (9)	1–0	Congleton Town (9)	
2	Warrington Rylands (9)	1–1 (3–1 p)	West Auckland Town (9)	
3	Walsall Wood (9)	0–0 (5–4 p)	Anstey Nomads (9)	
4	Hanworth Villa (9)	2–2 (3–5 p)	Long Eaton United (9)	
5	Cobham (9)	0–1	Leighton Town (9)	
6	Hadley (9)	0–0 (4–5 p)	Binfield (9)	
7	Tavistock (9)	1–3	United Services Portsmouth (10)	
8	Plymouth Parkway (9)	2–4	Flackwell Heath (9)	

== Quarter-finals ==
The draw was made on 19 April 2021. Originally scheduled for 6 March 2021, the quarter-finals were postponed due to the COVID-19 pandemic. On 11 March 2021, it was announced that the ties would take place on 1 and 8 May 2021.

Tie	Home team (tier)	Score	Away team (tier)	Att.
Saturday 1 May 2021
2	Leighton Town (9)	1–2	Walsall Wood (9)	
3	Long Eaton United (9)	0–5	Binfield (9)	
4	United Services Portsmouth (10)	2–0	Flackwell Heath (9)	
Saturday 8 May 2021
1	Warrington Rylands (9)	1–0	Hebburn Town (9)	

== Semi-finals ==
The draw was made on 26 April 2021. Originally scheduled for 27 March 2021, the semi-finals were postponed due to the COVID-19 pandemic. On 11 March 2021, it was announced that the ties would take place on 8 and 15 May 2021.

15 May 2021
15:00

Warrington Rylands (9)	2–1	Walsall Wood (9)

Gorsey Lane, Warrington
Attendance: 0

8 May 2021
15:00

United Services Portsmouth (10)	1–1 (3–4 p)	Binfield (9)

The Victory Stadium, Portsmouth
Attendance: 0

== Final ==
Originally scheduled for 8 May 2021, the Final was postponed due to the COVID-19 pandemic. On 11 March 2021, the date was announced for the tie to take place on Saturday 22 May 2021 at Wembley Stadium.

22 May 2021
12:15

Binfield (9)	2–3	Warrington Rylands (9)
Ferdinand 42', 67'		Nevitt 25', 44' (pen.), 59'

Wembley Stadium
Attendance: 3,000
