= Richard Pears =

English footballer (born 1976)

Personal information
- Full name: Richard James Pears
- Date of birth: 16 July 1976 (age 50)
- Place of birth: Exeter, Devon, England
- Position: Forward

Team information
- Current team: Cullompton Rangers (manager)

Youth career
- –1994: Exeter City

Senior career*
| Years | Team | Apps | (Gls) |
| 1994–1997 | Exeter City | 60 | (8) |
| 1997 | Torquay United | 0 | (0) |
- Cullompton Rangers
- Heavitree United
| –1998 | Clyst Rovers | | |
| 1998–2004 | Tiverton Town | | |
| 2004 | Mangotsfield United | | |
| 2004–2005 | Exmouth Town | | |
| 2005 | Willand Rovers | | |
| 2005–2006 | Tiverton Town | | |
| 2006–2007 | Willand Rovers | | |
| 2007–2008 | Exmouth Town | | |
| 2008–2009 | Cullompton Rangers | | |
| 2009–2010 | Tiverton Town | | |

Managerial career
- 2007–2008: Exmouth Town
- 2008–2010: Cullompton Rangers
- 2010–2011: Royal Marines
- 2012–2017: Exmouth Town
- 2017: Barnstaple Town
- 2018: Sidmouth Town
- 2018–2019: Buckland Athletic
- 2024: Bridgwater United
- 2024–: Cullompton Rangers
- * Club domestic league appearances and goals

Richard James Pears (born 16 July 1976) is an English former professional footballer who played as a forward. He is currently manager of Cullompton Rangers.

== Career ==
Born in Exeter, Pears began his career as a trainee with Exeter City, turning professional in July 1994, having made his league debut the previous season. He played 60 league games for Exeter before being released at the end of the 1996–97 season. He briefly joined local rivals Torquay United, but left without appearing for the Plainmoor side.

Pears then began his career in non-league football, joining Cullompton Rangers and subsequently playing for Heavitree United before joining Clyst Rovers. He moved to Tiverton Town in October 1998, playing in the winning FA Vase side at the end of that season. He remained with Tiverton until January 2004 when he joined Mangotsfield United in a player-exchange deal, Darren Edwards moving in the opposite direction.

In August 2004, Pears left Mangotsfield to join Exmouth Town as player-assistant manager., leaving to join Willand Rovers in the June 2005. In September 2005, Pears returned to Tiverton Town,

Pears rejoined Willand Rovers in June 2006, but left at the end of the 2006–07 season as he could not commit to the travelling involved, partly due to his work requirements with Exeter City Council.

In June 2007, despite being linked with a move to Elmore, Pears was appointed as manager of Exmouth Town.

In May 2008 he was appointed as co-manager of Cullompton Rangers, alongside Lee Annunziata.

In February 2010 he returned to Tiverton Town for his third stint at the club, to provide cover to Martyn Rogers injury, and suspension hit side. In June 2010 he was appointed manager of the Royal Marines. After managing Exmouth Town from 2012 until 2017, he was appointed manager of Barnstaple Town in May 2017. He resigned as the club's manager in December.

During the summer of 2018 Pears was announced as the new manager of Sidmouth Town. However, he left to take over as manager of Buckland Athletic on 15 October 2018. He left Buckland in September 2019.

He subsequently worked as assistant manager at Bideford. In September 2024 he was appointed manager of Bridgwater United. However, he resigned from the role in November and rejoined Cullompton Rangers as manager.
