= Cornwall Senior Cup =

- Founded: 1892; 134 years ago
- Region: Cornwall
- Teams: 52
- Current champions: Penzance
- Most championships: Truro City (16 titles)
- Website: Cornwall Senior Cup

The Cornwall County Football Association Senior Cup, commonly known as the Cornwall Senior Cup, is a knockout cup competition in English football for clubs based in Cornwall, run by and named after the Cornwall County Football Association. It is a County Cup competition involving clubs from the South West Peninsula League and St Piran League.

As of the 2015–16 season, the competition is called the RGB Senior Cup for sponsorship reasons. The reigning champions are Falmouth Town, who defeated Saltash United 2-1 in the 2019 final to win the cup for the 12th time. It was Falmouth's first final appearance since 1997.

== History ==
The competition was created in 1892 by the Cornwall County Football Association to provide a knockout tournament for the county's clubs. The inaugural tournament was won by Penzance in 1893. The competition did not take place between 1915 and 1919 due to the First World War, and again between 1939 and 1945 due to the Second World War. In previous years, clubs were grouped together in earlier rounds due to Cornwall's geography, with a runner-up match being played alongside the final. This was discontinued in 1978, with the Cornwall Junior Cup taking its place. Both matches are played on Easter Monday at a neutral venue.

== Format ==
The Cornwall Senior Cup is contested by 52 clubs, as of the 2009–10 season, with seven rounds being played to decide the winner.

The preliminary round is made up of twenty-four clubs from the Cornwall Combination and East Cornwall League, played during the month of September. The first round is made up of the winners from the previous round and the clubs who received a bye, which takes place in October. The second round, played in December, is when clubs from the South West Peninsula League enter the competition, joining the eight winners from the previous round.

The third round is made up of sixteen teams, and the quarter-finals are made up of eight teams, with ties being played during the months of January and February respectively. The remaining clubs enter the semi-finals, which are played at a neutral venue in March, with the final being contested in April, again at a neutral venue.

Round	Main date	Clubs remaining	Clubs involved	Winners from previous round	New entries this round	Leagues entering at this round
Preliminary Round	September	52	24	–	24	Cornwall Combination; East Cornwall League
First Round	October	40	16	12	4	Cornwall Combination; East Cornwall League
Second Round	December	32	32	8	24	SWPL Premier Division; SWPL Division One West
Third Round	January	16	16	16	–	–
Quarter-Finals	February	8	8	8	–	–
Semi-Finals	March	4	4	4	–	–
Final	April	2	2	2	–	–

== Finals ==
This section lists every final of the competition played since 1893, the winners, the runners-up, and the result.

=== Key ===
*	Match went to a replay
†	Match went to extra time
‡	Match decided by a penalty shootout after extra time
#	Shared trophy

=== 1893–1912 ===
Season	Winner	Score	Runners–up	Venue	Notes/Ref
1892–93	Penzance	5–0	Launceston	Liskeard	
1893–94	Camborne	6–1	Liskeard Athletic	Bodmin	
1894–95	Truro City	5–1	Launceston	Bodmin	
1895–96	Penzance	2–1	Liskeard Athletic	Liskeard	
1896–97	Torpoint Defiance	0–0	Penzance	Truro	
1896–97	Torpoint Defiance	1–0	Penzance	Bodmin	
1897–98	Penzance	6–6	Launceston	Bodmin	
1897–98	Penzance	3–0	Launceston	Truro	
1898–99	Penzance	2–0	Launceston	Bodmin	
1899–1900	Launceston	2–0	Penzance	Truro	
1900–01	Launceston	1–1	Penzance	Bodmin	
1900–01	Launceston	5–1	Penzance	Truro	
1901–02	Truro City	1–0	Liskeard Athletic	St Austell	
1902–03	Truro City	2–1	St Austell	Wadebridge	
1903–04	Penzance	2–0	Liskeard Athletic	Kenwyn, Truro	4000
1904–05	Liskeard Athletic	1–0 †	Penzance	St Austell	5000
1905–06	Torpoint Athletic	6–1	Newquay	*	
1906–07	Torpoint Athletic	4–0	Newquay		
1907–08	Penzance	2–0 †	Newquay	*	
1908–09	Torpoint Athletic	1–0	Newquay		
1909–10	Torpoint Athletic	2–1 †	Truro City	*	
1910–11	Truro City	3–0	Looe Town		
1911–12	St Austell	2–1	Truro City		

=== 1913–1932 ===
Season	Winner	Score	Runners–up	Notes
1912–13	St Austell	2–1	Penzance	
1913–14	St Austell	2–0	Truro City	
1914–15	No competitive football was played due to the First World War.			
1915–16	No competitive football was played due to the First World War.			
1916–17	No competitive football was played due to the First World War.			
1917–18	No competitive football was played due to the First World War.			
1918–19	No competitive football was played due to the First World War.			
1919–20	Torpoint Athletic	1–0	Truro City	
1920–21	Looe Town	2–1 †	St Austell	*
1921–22	Torpoint Athletic	1–1	Truro City	#

Season	Winner	Score	Runners–up	Notes
1922–23	Torpoint Athletic	2–1	Fowey Town	
1923–24	Truro City	3–1	Looe Town	
1924–25	Looe Town	2–0	Truro City	*
1925–26	Looe Town	2–1	Newquay	
1926–27	Truro City	2–0	Looe Town	
1927–28	Truro City	5–1	Tintagel	
1928–29	Torpoint Athletic	2–1	St Austell	
1929–30	Saltash United	1–1	Truro City	#
1930–31	Saltash United	5–3	St Austell	
1931–32	Saltash United	2–1	St Blazey	

=== 1933–1952 ===
Season	Winner	Score	Runners–up	Notes
1932–33	Torpoint Athletic	1–0	St Austell	*
1933–34	St Austell	2–1	Newquay	
1934–35	Newquay	2–0	St Blazey	*
1935–36	St Blazey	5–1	Newquay	
1936–37	Helston Athletic	4–3	Truro City	*
1937–38	Truro City	4–0	St Austell	
1938–39	St Austell	2–1	Truro City	
1939–40	No competitive football was played due to the Second World War.			
1940–41	No competitive football was played due to the Second World War.			
1941–42	No competitive football was played due to the Second World War.			

Season	Winner	Score	Runners–up	Notes
1942–43	No competitive football was played due to the Second World War.			
1943–44	No competitive football was played due to the Second World War.			
1944–45	No competitive football was played due to the Second World War.			
1945–46	St Austell	3–1	Nanpean	
1946–47	St Austell	5–0	Truro City	
1947–48	Penzance	4–2	St Blazey	
1948–49	St Austell	2–0	Penzance	
1949–50	St Blazey	2–0	Penzance	
1950–51	Saltash United	4–1	Wadebridge Town	
1951–52	Bugle	3–2	Saltash United	

=== 1953–1972 ===
Season	Winner	Score	Runners–up	Notes
1952–53	Newquay	2–0	St Austell	
1953–54	St Blazey	4–1	St Austell	*
1954–55	Newquay	4–1	Penzance	
1955–56	St Blazey	2–1	Truro City	*
1956–57	Newquay	3–2	Penzance	*
1957–58	St Blazey	3–2	Newquay	*
1958–59	Truro City	2–0	St Blazey	*
1959–60	St Blazey	5–2	Nanpean	
1960–61	Penzance	3–1	Truro City	
1961–62	Falmouth Town	7–1	St Blazey	

Season	Winner	Score	Runners–up	Notes
1962–63	St Blazey	4–1	St Austell	
1963–64	St Austell	3–2	St Blazey	
1964–65	Falmouth Town	2–1	St Blazey	*
1965–66	Falmouth Town	2–1	St Blazey	*
1966–67	Truro City	4–1	Falmouth Town	
1967–68	Falmouth Town	2–0	Torpoint Athletic	
1968–69	St Austell	3–2	Porthleven	*
1969–70	Truro City	6–1	Newquay	
1970–71	Falmouth Town	4–1	Liskeard Athletic	
1971–72	St Austell	6–1	Looe Town	

=== 1973–1992 ===
Season	Winner	Score	Runners–up	Notes
1972–73	Penzance	4–2	Falmouth Town	*
1973–74	Falmouth Town	4–0	Wadebridge Town	*
1974–75	Saltash United	1–0	Penzance	
1975–76	Falmouth Town	5–0	Liskeard Athletic	
1976–77	Falmouth Town	1–0	Liskeard Athletic	
1977–78	Falmouth Town	2–0	St Austell	
1978–79	Falmouth Town	2–1	Liskeard Athletic	*
1979–80	Wadebridge Town	2–0	St Blazey	
1980–81	Penzance	1–0	Saltash United	
1981–82	Saltash United	2–1	Falmouth Town	

Season	Winner	Score	Runners–up	Notes
1982–83	Launceston	1–0	Falmouth Town	
1983–84	Liskeard Athletic	3–0	Millbrook	
1984–85	Liskeard Athletic	2–1	Newquay	*
1985–86	Liskeard Athletic	1–0	Bugle	
1986–87	St Blazey	1–0	Saltash United	
1987–88	Saltash United	1–0	Newquay	
1988–89	Liskeard Athletic	2–1	Saltash United	
1989–90	Liskeard Athletic	2–1	Falmouth Town	
1990–91	Saltash United	4–1	Falmouth Town	
1991–92	Newquay	1–0	Falmouth Town	

=== 1993–2012 ===
Season	Winner	Score	Runners–up	Notes
1992–93	Saltash United	3–2	Launceston	
1993–94	Liskeard Athletic	2–1	Bodmin Town	
1994–95	Truro City	2–1	Liskeard Athletic	
1995–96	Torpoint Athletic	2–0	Porthleven	*
1996–97	Falmouth Town	2–1	Nanpean	*
1997–98	Truro City	3–2	Porthleven	*
1998–99	Bodmin Town	2–1	Millbrook	
1999–2000	St Blazey	2–1	Porthleven	*
2000–01	St Blazey	4–0	Porthleven	*
2001–02	St Blazey	2–0	Liskeard Athletic	

Season	Winner	Score	Runners–up	Notes
2002–03	Liskeard Athletic	1–1 ‡	St Blazey	*
2003–04	Porthleven	2–1	Saltash United	
2004–05	Launceston	2–1	Bodmin Town	
2005–06	Truro City	4–1	Bodmin Town	
2006–07	Truro City	1–0	Liskeard Athletic	
2007–08	Truro City	2–1	Saltash United	
2008–09	St Austell	3–2	Saltash United	
2009–10	Bodmin Town	3–1	Camelford	
2010–11	Bodmin Town	3–2	St Austell	
2011–12	Bodmin Town	3–2	Saltash United	

=== 2013–present ===
Season	Winner	Score	Runners–up	Notes
2012–13	Bodmin Town	4–3 †	Helston Athletic	
2013–14	St Austell	5–3 ‡	Bodmin Town	
2014–15	St Austell	3–0	Godolphin Atlantic	
2015–16	Bodmin Town	7–0	Godolphin Atlantic	
2016–17	Bodmin Town	2-1	Saltash United	
2017–18	Saltash United	3-2	Mousehole	
2018–19	Falmouth Town	2-1	Saltash United	
2019–20	No champions; season abandoned (coronavirus pandemic)			
2020–21	No champions; season curtailed (local lockdowns)			
2021–22	Falmouth Town	1-0	Wendron United	
2022–23	Helston Athletic	4–3 †	Millbrook	
2023–24	Falmouth Town	3-2	St Austell	
2024–25	Falmouth Town	1-0	St Austell	
2025–26	Penzance AFC	3-0	Camelford	Attendance: 870

== Table of winners ==
Club	Wins	Last final won
Truro City	16	2008
Falmouth Town	15	2025
St Austell	14	2015
Penzance	11	2026
St Blazey	11	2002
Torpoint Athletic	11	1996
Saltash United	10	2018
Liskeard Athletic	8	2003
Bodmin Town	7	2017
Newquay	5	1992
Launceston	4	2005
Looe Town	3	1926
Helston Athletic	2	2023
Bugle	1	1952
Camborne	1	1894
Porthleven	1	2004
Wadebridge Town	1	1980

== Sponsorship ==
- 2012–13 The competition was known as the Westinsure Senior Cup
- 2015– RGB Builders
