= Liverton United F.C. =

Association football club in England

Coordinates: 50.558239°N 3.677073°W

Liverton United
- Full name: Liverton United Football Club
- Nickname: The Lillys
- Founded: 1902
- Ground: Halford, Ilsington
- Chairman: Chris Stephens
- Manager: Mark Simpson
- League: South Devon League Division One
- 2024–25: South Devon League Division Three, 3rd of 13
Home colours	Away colours

Liverton United Football Club is a football club based in Ilsington, Devon, England. They are currently members of the South Devon League Division One and play at the Halford ground.

== History ==
The club was established in 1902 and joined the South Devon League during the 1920s. In 2007 they moved up to the newly formed South West Peninsula League, becoming founder members of Division One East. After finishing third in 2009–10, the club were Division One East champions in 2010–11, also winning the Devon Premier Cup with a 1–0 win over Budleigh Salterton.

The 2011–12 season saw Liverton retain the Premier Cup and win the league's Charity Vase. They were also Division One East champions for a second successive season, earning promotion to the Premier Division. However, despite finishing in mid-table in the Premier Division the following season, the club were demoted back to Division One East for failing to meet ground grading requirements. In 2019 the club were founder members of the new Devon League, becoming members of its North East Division.

== Honours ==
- South West Peninsula League
  - Division One East champions 2010–11, 2011–12
  - Charity Vase winners 2011–12
- Devon Premier Cup
  - Winners 2010–11, 2011–12
