= Bodmin Town F.C. =

Association football club in England

Coordinates: 50°28′8.6″N 4°42′53.9″W

Bodmin Town
- Full name: Bodmin Town Football Club
- Nicknames: Black & Ambers
- Founded: 1889
- Ground: Priory Park, Bodmin
- Capacity: 5,000 (400 seated)
- Chairman: Claire Butler
- Manager: Huw Morgan
- League: St Piran League Premier Division East
- 2024–25: South West Peninsula League Premier Division West, 13th of 16 (voluntarily demoted)
Home colours

Bodmin Town Football Club is a football club based in Bodmin, Cornwall, England. They are currently members of the St Piran League Premier Division East and play at Priory Park.

== History ==
The club was established by W.M. Pethybridge and C.H. Bray in 1889. After amalgamating with a team from the local barracks in 1900, they started playing in white shirts, gaining the nickname "the Lilywhites". They won the Bodmin & District (Senior) League in 1922–23, and in 1925 the colour of the club's home shirts was changed to amber. They won the league again in 1926–27 and were runners-up in 1947–48.

In 1953 Bodmin joined the South Western League, where they played for nine seasons, before leaving at the end of the 1961–62 season to play in the East Cornwall Premier League. They rejoined the South Western League in 1969, and were runners-up in 1976–77. They won the league for the first time in 1990–91, and were champions again in 1993–94. They won the Cornwall Senior Cup for the first time in 1998–99, beating Millbrook 2–1 in the final. After finishing as runners-up twice in a row, they won the league for a third time in 2005–06.

In 2007 the club were founder members of the South West Peninsula League, and were placed in the Premier Division; they went on to win the league and the League Cup in both of its first two seasons. They finished as runners-up in 2009–10 and 2010–11, winning the Senior Cup in both seasons, beating Camelford 3–1 in the 2010 final and St Austell 3–2 in 2011. The 2011–12 season saw them win the league, the League Cup and the Senior Cup, beating Saltash United 3–2 in the final. They repeated the feat in 2012–13, with Helston Athletic beaten 4–3 after extra time in the Senior Cup final. A fifth league title was won in 2015–16, with the club also winning the League Cup for a fifth time and the Senior Cup for a sixth time with a 7–0 win over Godolphin Athletic in the final.

Following league reorganisation at the end of the 2018–19 season, Bodmin were placed in the Premier Division West. At the end of the 2024–25 the club were voluntarily relegated to the Premier Division East of the St Piran League.

== Ground ==
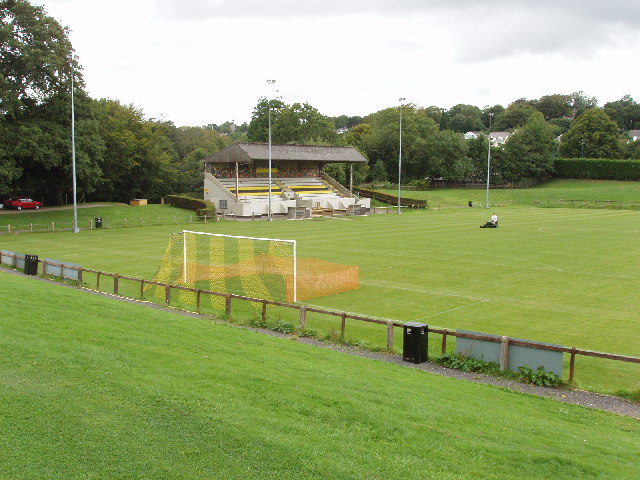
The Priory Park ground

The club initially played at Cooksland, a ground located on Liskeard Road. They subsequently moved to Coldharbour Lane and then Barn Park, before returning to Cooksland. They later moved to Westheath, which they shared with St Lawrence's Hospital football club and the cricket club.

In 1948 they moved to their current ground, Priory Park, which is owned by the local council. A stand was relocated from Westheath to the new ground, but was replaced by a new 400-capacity main stand in 1958, which cost £2,500 to build; the money was donated by TH Dennison, with the stand being named the Dennison Memorial Stand. Floodlights were installed in 1971 and a new clubhouse built in 1985.

One end of the ground consists of grass banking, with the other two sides of the pitch left open. The ground currently has a capacity of 5,000.

== Honours ==
- South West Peninsula League
  - Premier Division champions 2007–08, 2008–09, 2011–12, 2012–13, 2015–16
  - League Cup winners 2007–08, 2008–09, 2011–12, 2012–13, 2015–16
- South Western League
  - Champions 1990–91, 1993–94, 2005–06
  - League Cup winners 1993–94
- Bodmin & District (Senior) League
  - Champions 1922–23, 1926–27
- Cornwall Senior Cup
  - Winners 1998–99, 2009–10, 2010–11, 2011–12, 2012–13, 2015–16
- Cornwall Charity Cup
  - Winners 1986–87, 2013–14

== Records ==
- Best FA Cup performance: Third qualifying round 2011–12
- Best FA Trophy performance: Second qualifying round 1970–71
- Best FA Vase performance: Fifth Round 2012–13

== See also ==
- Bodmin Town F.C. players
- Bodmin Town F.C. managers
