= Millbrook A.F.C. =

Association football club in England

Coordinates: 50.351316°N 4.2110400°W

Millbrook
- Full name: Millbrook Association Football Club
- Nicknames: The Magpies, The Brook
- Founded: 1888
- Ground: Jenkins Park, Millbrook
- Chairman: Ryan Reilly
- Managers: Jason Richards and Steve Richards
- League: South West Peninsula League Premier Division West
- 2024–25: South West Peninsula League Premier Division West, 15th of 16
Home colours	Away colours

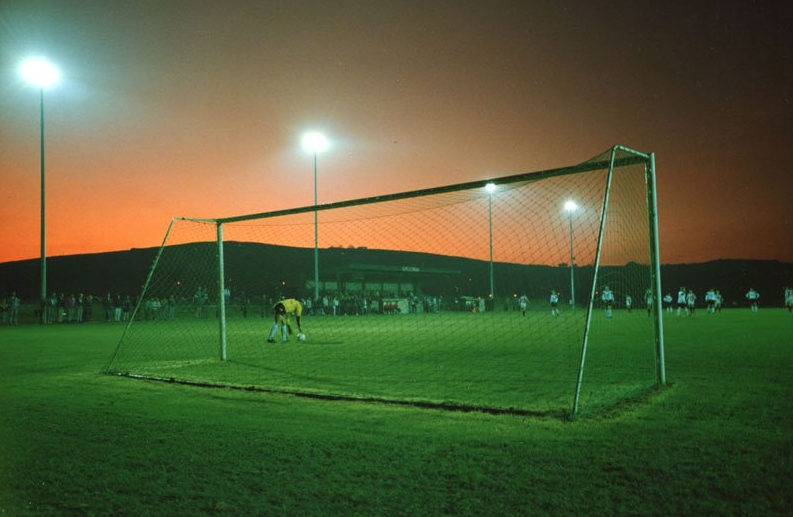
An action shot from Mill Park (now Jenkins Park) in the South Western League, 1990–91

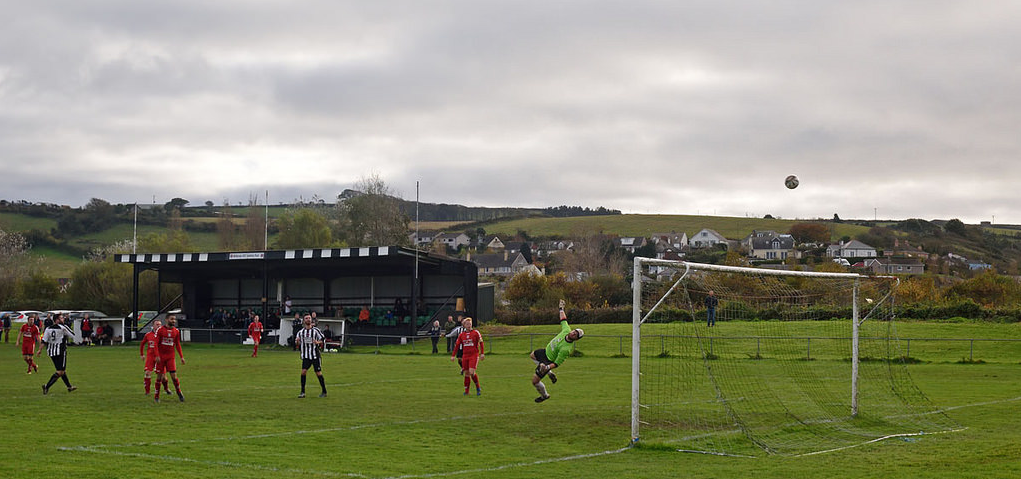
Action from a South West Peninsula League match at Jenkins Park, with the view of Millbrook in the background.

Millbrook Association Football Club is a football club based in Millbrook, Cornwall, England. They are currently members of the South West Peninsula League Premier Division West and play at Jenkins Park.

== History ==
The club was established in 1888. They played in district leagues, including the Plymouth & District League, until joining the South Western League in 1980. The club were South Western League runners-up in 1981–82 and finished in the top five every season until 1988–89, also reaching the final of the Cornwall Senior Cup in 1983–84. After losing another Cornwall Senior Cup final in 1998–99, they entered the FA Vase for the first time in 2004–05, losing 2–1 at home to Exmouth Town. The club remained in the league until it merged with the Devon County League to form the South West Peninsula League in 2007, at which point they were placed in Division One West.

After finishing bottom of Division One West in 2008–09 and second-from-bottom in 2009–10, financial problems forced Millbrook to resign from the league, with the first team taking over from the reserves in Division One of the East Cornwall League. The club were Division One runners-up in 2012–13, earning promotion to the Premier Division. A third-place finish in the Premier Division in 2013–14, a season that also saw them lose the League Cup final, was enough to secure promotion back to Division One West of the South West Peninsula League.

In 2017–18, Millbrook were Division One West champions, earning promotion to the Premier Division. Following league reorganisation at the end of the 2018–19 season, the club were placed in the Premier Division East. In 2021 they were promoted to the Premier Division of the Western League based on their results in the abandoned 2019–20 and 2020–21 seasons. The club finished bottom of the Premier Division in 2023–24 and were relegated to the Premier Division West of the South West Peninsula League.

== Ground ==
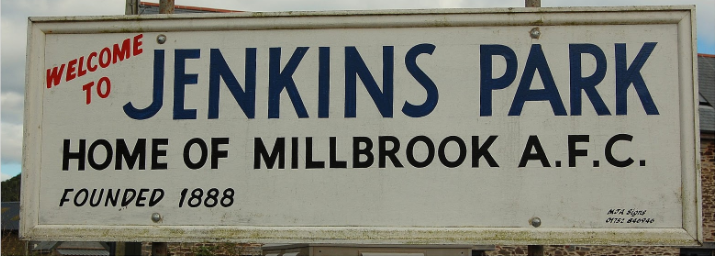
'Welcome to Jenkins Park', the home of Millbrook A.F.C.

The club play at Jenkins Park on Mill Road. The ground was originally named Mill Park, but was renamed in 2014 after former professional footballer Reg Jenkins, who was born in the village and went on to become Rochdale's record goalscorer. After retiring he returned to Cornwall and helped run the Millbrook football club. The ground includes a covered stand on one side of the pitch, with other three sides railed off. The clubhouse is located behind one goal.

== Honours ==
- South West Peninsula League
  - Division One West champions 2017–18

== Records ==
- Best FA Vase performance: Third round, 2020–21
- Best FA Cup performance: Extra preliminary round, 2020–21
