= Stoke Gabriel & Torbay Police F.C. =

Association football club in England

Coordinates: 50°24′50.9″N 3°37′02.8″W

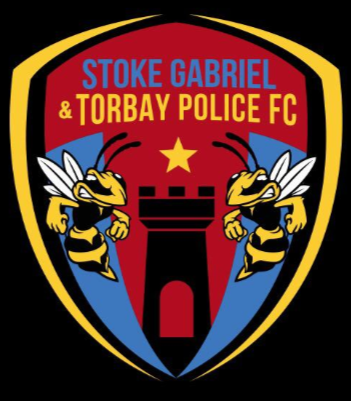
- Full name: Stoke Gabriel & Torbay Police Football Club
- Nicknames: The Bees, Stoke
- Founded: 1905 (Stoke Gabriel AFC); 1969 (Torbay Police FC); 2021 (Stoke Gabriel & Torbay Police FC)
- Ground: Broadley Lane, Stoke Gabriel
- Manager: Vacant
- League: South West Peninsula League Premier Division East
- 2025–26: South West Peninsula League Premier Division East, 6th of 16
- Website: https://stokeandtorbaypolicefc.com/
Home colours	Away colours

Stoke Gabriel & Torbay Police Football Club is a football club based in Stoke Gabriel, Devon, established in the early 1900s as Stoke Gabriel AFC. In June 2021, the club merged with newly promoted Devon League club, Torbay Police FC, administrated by police officers and staff of the Devon & Cornwall Police, originally founded in 1969. The newly merged club, nicknamed "The Bees", competes in the South West Peninsula League Premier Division East and currently plays at the G.J. Churchward Memorial Ground. The club has two senior men’s teams, a ladies team and upwards of 30 youth teams.

== History ==
=== Stoke Gabriel AFC ===
Formed in the early 1900s, Stoke Gabriel Football Club had relied on the generosity of local farmers to provide a ground during which the changing rooms remained in the village where both the school room and an old army hut were utilised. In 1981 the club purchased land in Broadley Lane and developed a sloping field into their current home, the G.J. Churchward Memorial Ground, named in honour of the Great Western Railway Chief Engineer who was born in Stoke Gabriel. The ground was officially opened in 1984 with a visit from Torquay United. The opening of the new ground coincided with the most successful era of the club during which the South Devon League Premier Division, The Herald Cup and the George Belli Cup were won.

Stoke Gabriel were founder members of the Devon County League in 1992, and were champions in 1994–95 and 1996–97. After struggling in the league during the early 2000s, they were founder members of the South West Peninsula League in 2007, playing in Division One East. Runners-up three times in four years, they won the championship in 2013–14. They were demoted to Division One East at the end of the 2017–18 season after failing to install floodlights by the required deadline.

The club installed floodlights prior to the 2019–20 season, in order to comply with the conditions imposed upon them to enable their promotion back to Step 6.

During the 2020–21 season, Stoke Gabriel received national media attention after losing their opening ten games of the season, scoring twice and conceding 122 goals. The season was eventually curtailed due to the COVID-19 pandemic, with Stoke Gabriel having conceded 207 goals, scoring seven times, in 18 matches.

=== Torbay Police FC ===
Torbay Police Football Club was originally founded in 1969 before eventually folding in 1989. During this period the original club competed in the Police Divisional Cup, Wednesday League, East Devon League & South Devon Football League.

The club, in its new guise, was formed on 15 October 2010 by two local police officers. It was set up at this time to play in exhibition matches in aid of local charities and children with life limiting or changing conditions. The club hosted and played in a number of high-profile events, taking on the likes of Tottenham Hotspurs Legends, Arsenal FC XI, Aston Villa XI, Torquay United XI, Plymouth Argyle XI and Exeter City XI.

Torbay Police were re-entered into the South Devon Football League after more than two decades' absence. The club rose through the divisions, eventually gaining promotion to the Devon Football League (step 7) in 2021. The club was nicknamed 'The Bees' mainly due to the club home colours. The club also established a youth set-up and offered coaching sessions to children from the local community.

=== Merged club ===
On 2 June 2021, Stoke Gabriel had announced they had merged with Torbay Police to create Stoke Gabriel & Torbay Police FC.

Lee Langley, founder member of Torbay Police FC, took on the Chairperson role with Tim Perrin as Secretary and David Thomas as Head of Youth; during the somewhat difficult transition to the newly formed organisation. Langley had previously guided the Torbay club from Division 7 of the South Devon Football League to the Devon League (Step 7). After the initial transition period, Langley stood down from the role of chair; succeeded by Daniel Muirden, a former Stoke Gabriel player and coach, who was unanimously voted into the post. Perrin and Thomas retained their roles and Langley is now Club President.

== Former players ==
1. Players that have played/managed in the Football League or any foreign equivalent to this level (i.e. fully professional league).
2. Players with full international caps.
3. Players that hold a club record or have captained the club.

- (Wales) Kieffer Moore
- (England) Richard Hancox
- (England) Kevin Wills

== Honours ==
=== League honours ===
- South West Peninsula League Division One East:
  - Winners (2): 2013–14, 2016–17
  - Runners-up (3): 2009–10, 2011–12, 2012–13
- Devon County League:
  - Winners (2): 1994–95, 1996–97
  - Runners-up (3): 1993–94, 1995–96, 1999–2000
