= Wendron United F.C. =

Association football club in England

Coordinates: 50°09′46.8″N 5°11′33.0″W

Wendron United AFC
- Full name: Wendron United AFC
- Nickname: The Dron
- Founded: 1986
- Ground: The Underlane, Wendron
- Capacity: 1,000
- Chairman: Peter Thorne
- Manager: Michael O'Neill
- League: South West Peninsula League Premier Division West
- 2025–26: South West Peninsula League Premier Division West, 11th of 15

Wendron United Football Club is a football club based in Wendron, Cornwall. They are currently members of the South West Peninsula League Premier Division West and play at The Underlane.

== History ==
Wendron United F.C. was formed in 1986 as the football section of Wendron Cricket Club. As Wendron CC United, they joined the Cornwall Combination in 1998, and stayed there until 2007–08 when they joined the South West Peninsula League Division One West, dropping the 'CC' from their name. They remained in that league for two seasons before resigning mid-season in 2009–10.

Returning to the Cornwall Combination, they finished runners-up in 2013–14 and 2014–15, and gained promotion back to the SWPL Division One West. At the end of 2018–19 the league was restructured, and Wendron successfully applied for promotion to the Premier Division West, at Step 6 of the National League System.

The club installed floodlights in order to comply with the conditions imposed upon them to enable their promotion to Step 6. They played their first match under floodlit conditions on 17 September 2019, a 2–1 defeat to Penzance, in front of a crowd of 229. Wendron United entered the FA Vase for the first time in 2021–22.

== Honours ==
- Cornwall Combination
  - Runners-up 2013–14, 2014–15

== Records ==
Best FA Vase performance: second round 2021–22
