= Royal Marines A.F.C. =

Former association football club in England

RMAFC
- Full name: Royal Marines Association Football Club
- Nickname(s): The Marines
- Founded: 2008
- Dissolved: 2012
- Ground: Endurance Park CTCRM, Lympstone
- League: South West Peninsula East Division; South West Peninsula Premier Division
Home colours	Away colours

Royal Marines Association Football Club was a football club based in Lympstone, near Exmouth in Devon, England. The committee and players were all serving or retired Royal Marines. At the end of the 2011–12 season, the club withdrew from the South West Peninsula League Premier Division and folded, due to increased operational commitments.

== Honours ==
=== League honours ===
- South West Peninsula League Division One East
  - Champions (1): 2009–10

== See also ==
- Royal Marines Football Association
