= Sport in Plymouth =

Sport in the English town

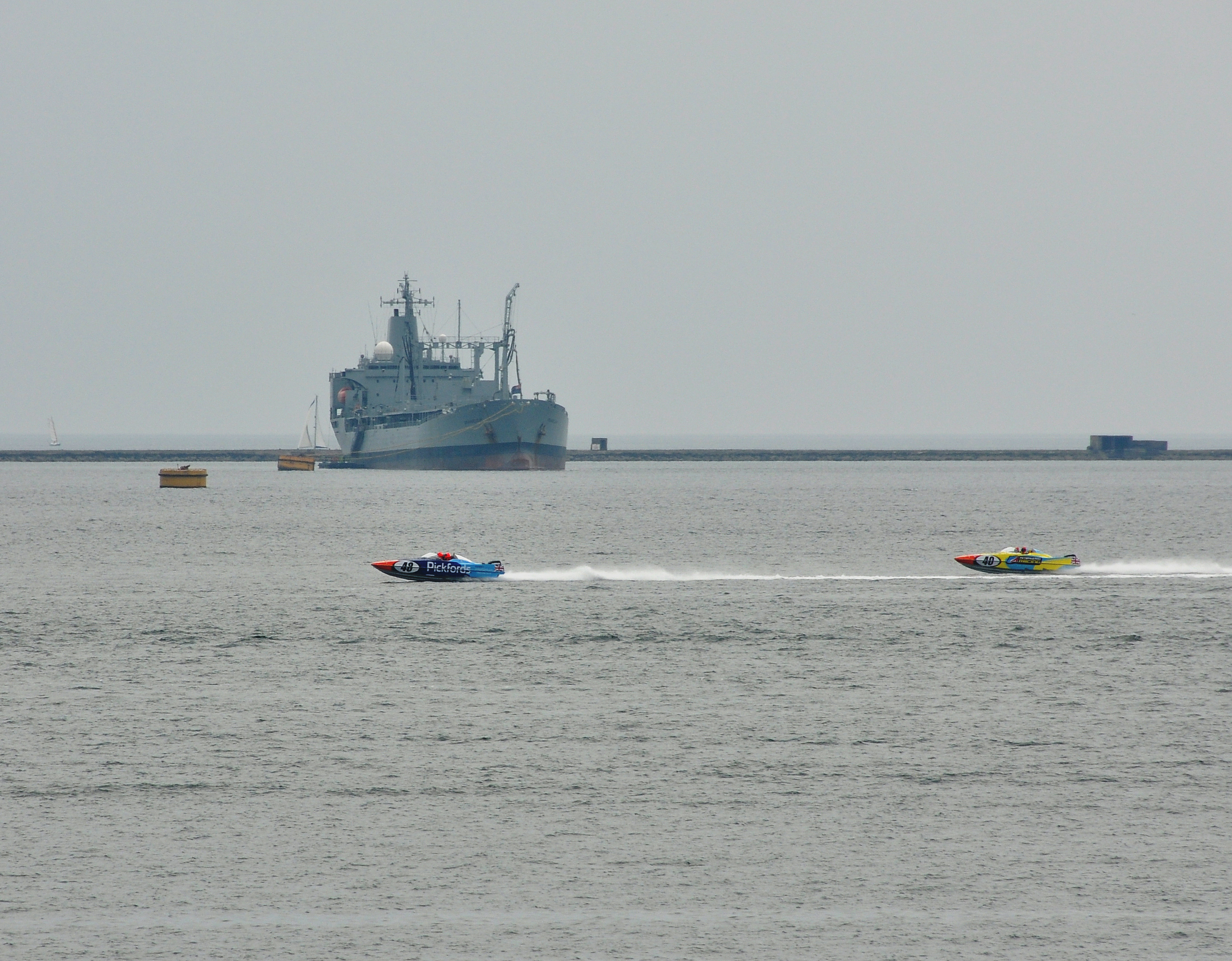
P1 Powerboats racing in Plymouth Sound, Devon.

Sport in Plymouth, Devon, England, dates back to the 19th century with its first club, Plymouth United F.C., being founded in 1886. It is the largest city in England never to have had a football team in the first tier of English football. It is home to Plymouth Argyle Football Club, who play in the Football League One (third tier of English football) at the Home Park stadium in Central Park. It is Plymouth's only professional football team, however the city used to have another team called Plymouth United F.C. dating back to 1886. The club takes its nickname from the group of English non-conformists that left Plymouth for the New World in 1620: the club crest features the Mayflower, which carried the Pilgrims to Massachusetts and the club's mascot is named Pilgrim Pete.

The city is also home to clubs in nearly all sports, notably Plymouth Albion R.F.C. and both Plymouth City Patriots and Plymouth Raiders basketball clubs. Plymouth Albion Rugby Football Club is a rugby union club that was founded in 1921 and are currently in the third tier of Professional English Rugby National League 1 They play at The Brickfields. Plymouth Raiders play in the top tier of British Bastketball, the British Basketball League. They play at the Plymouth Pavilions, along with many other sports clubs and were founded in 1983. Plymouth Gladiators are a speedway team in the British National League. Their meets are held at the Plymouth Coliseum. Plymouth is also home to the American football club the Plymouth Blitz. Plymouth is also home to diver Tom Daley.

== Team sports ==
Plymouth Argyle play professional football in the EFL Championship. The club is based at the Home Park stadium in Central Park. Other football teams in the city include Plymouth Parkway F.C., a Non-League football club who play at Bolitho Park, and Elburton Villa F.C., a Non-League football club who play at Haye Road. Signal Box Oak Villa F.C., who play in the Plymouth and West Devon Football League, who play at Ferndale Road.

Plymouth Albion play professional Rugby union currently competing in the third tier of Professional English Rugby the National League 1. They play their home games at The Brickfields. Other semi-professional and amateur clubs include armed forces team Devonport Services who play in the Tribute Western Counties West (tier 7), Plymstock Albion Oaks and Plymouth Argaum, both of whom play in Tribute Cornwall/Devon (tier 8). Additionally there are also many junior rugby union clubs playing in regional, Devon and Plymouth Combination leagues.

Plymouth Titans play in the Rugby League Conference South West Division.

Plymouth City Patriots represent Plymouth in the British Basketball League. Formed in 2021, they replaced the former professional club, Plymouth Raiders, after the latter team were withdrawn from competition due to venue issues. Raiders later reformed in 2023 and currently compete in the National Basketball League.

Plymouth Gladiators are a speedway team who reformed in 2006 after closing in 1970. The club are members of British National League, with home meetings taking place at the Plymouth Coliseum. The first track in Plymouth was located at the Pennycross Stadium in the Pennycross area and this operated both sides of WWII. The site was redeveloped for a school. Another Motoring event in the city is The Plymouth-Banjul Challenge is an annual car rally for charity, similar to the Dakar Rally.

Plymouth Cricket Club has teams at all levels. As of December 2007 it was threatened with eviction from its home at Peverell Park. Other cricket clubs are at Plympton and Plymstock.

Plymouth Blitz are University of Plymouth American football team who compete in the British American Football League.

Plymouth Mariners adult baseball club play in the newly formed independent South West Baseball League alongside the Torbay Barons, Bristol Bats and the Exeter Spitfires. They play all their home games at Wilson Field in Central Park, Plymouth.

Among the several hockey clubs in the city is Plymouth Marjon Hockey Club, one of the South West of England's largest and most successful hockey clubs, which is also based at UCP Marjon. Other prominent clubs include PGSOB, Devonport Services, OPM, Mannamead Ladies and Plym Valley Ladies.

Plymouth and District Netball League is one of the biggest and most competitive in the country with junior and senior sections. Lacrosse is also enjoying a revival particularly among university students.

== Water sports ==
Inshore and offshore yacht racing is organised from the Royal Western Yacht Club at Queen Anne's Battery and there is a coastal and cross channel passage racing calendar. The Royal Plymouth Corinthian Yacht Club has its clubhouse located on the Barbican and there are several other sailing clubs on the rivers Plym, Tamar and Yealm. Several of these provide members and visitors with weekly 'round the cans' divisional weeknight racing in Plymouth Sound.

There are facilities for other watersports including water-skiing, windsurfing and diving and there is a well-used watersports centre at Turnchapel. There are rowing clubs on both rivers and a growing interest in gig racing. In 2006 after three years competitive inshore power boat racing, Plymouth lost the event to the Solent.

Tom Daley is a diver, who specialises in the 10-metre platform event. He started diving at the age of seven, and was a member of Plymouth Diving Club He has made an impact in national and international competition at an early age.

Plymouth Leander is the most successful swimming club in Great Britain; there are several indoor and outdoor public pools.

There are sea-angling options from boats based on the Barbican and a large number of Plymothians fish from hundreds of spots around the Sound and along the rivers.

== Racquet sports ==
Tennis is played in many clubs; there are indoor tennis courts at Derriford and Ivybridge and outdoor public courts spread across the city including at St Budeaux, West Hoe and Plymstock.

The city has many public and private squash courts, no racquets courts but badminton is widely played.

== Target sports ==
Bowls is popular because of the link with Sir Francis Drake and there are many public and club greens. Plymouth Croquet Club is at Hartley and there is another club at Durnford Street.

There is a golf club at Staddon Heights overlooking Plymouth Sound and a 9-hole pitch and putt course in Central Park. There is a large commercial driving range near Elburton.

== Greyhound racing ==
Greyhound racing was conducted at five separate venues throughout the city. The most significant of these was the National Greyhound Racing Club (NGRC) affiliated stadium at Pennycross Stadium which existed from 1928 until 1972.

In addition to this main venue there were four short lived venues where the racing was independent (not affiliated to the sports governing body the NGRC) and they were known as a flapping tracks, which was the nickname given to independent tracks. The first was at Beacon Park from 1928 to 1931. After racing came to an end on 4 July 1931 the operation transferred to a new site in Lipson Vale. The new site at the end of Efford Lane was known as Castle Field and adopted the name Beacon Castle. The Beacon Castle Greyhound and Whippet Sports Ground opened on 22 October 1931, racing on Tuesday and Thursday evenings and Saturday afternoons. Favoured distances was 475 and 660 yards and they used a trackless hare. Racing ended in 1934.

The third venue was at Plymstock Park which opened on 26 May 1931 and operated only for special gala events. The fourth venue was at West Park in Higher St Budeaux and was called the Devonport Greyhound and whippet track. It opened on 10 October 1931

== Other sports ==
Plymouth Judo Club is one of the oldest in the southwest and there several other martial arts clubs in the city.

Adjacent to the Brickfields rugby stadium is the Plymouth athletics track.

The annual Plymouth half marathon starts and ends on The Hoe.

For skateboarders there is an outdoor concrete skate park at Central Park Youth Park.

Plymouth has been noted as a Parkour and Free Running hotspot.

== See also ==
- Culture of Plymouth
