= Cullompton Rangers F.C. =

Association football club in England

Coordinates: 50.854523°N 3.3868475°W

Cullompton Rangers
- Full name: Cullompton Rangers Football Club
- Nicknames: The Cully, Rangers
- Founded: 1945
- Ground: Speeds Meadow, Cullompton
- Chairman: Clive Jones
- Manager: Richard Pears
- League: South West Peninsula League Premier Division East
- 2025–26: South West Peninsula League Premier Division East, 3rd of 16
Home colours	Away colours

Cullompton Rangers Football Club is a football club based in Cullompton, Devon, England. They are currently members of the South West Peninsula League Premier Division East and play at Speeds Meadow.

== History ==
The club was established in 1945 and initially played in the East Devon Victory League, before joining the Exeter & District League. They were Division One champions in 1959–60, earning promotion to the Premier Division. After finishing as Premier Division runners-up in their first season in the division, they went on to win the league title in 1961–62 and 1963–64. However, they were relegated after finishing bottom of the Premier Division in 1966–67. After another relegation, the club were Division Two champions in 1972–73 and later won Division One again in 1978–79, earning promotion back to the Premier Division of the renamed Devon & Exeter League and went on to win the East Devon Senior Cup in 1983–84.

In 1993 Cullompton were founder members of the Devon County League. They finished as runners-up in 1997–98 and again the following season, in which they also won the Devon Premier Cup. In 2007 the league merged with the South Western League to form the South West Peninsula League, with the club placed in the Premier Division. Although they finished bottom of the division in the league's first season, they were not relegated. Following league reorganisation at the end of the 2018–19 season, the club were placed in the Premier Division East.

== Ground ==
The club initially played at Cullompton School Playing Fields, before moving to Speeds Meadow. Although they left Speeds Meadow to play at Knightswood and later Court Drive, they eventually returned to Speeds Meadow.

Floodlights were installed in 1998, and upgraded dressing room facilities were opened by Steve Perryman on 28 February 2012.

== Honours ==
- Devon Premier Cup
  - Winners 1998–99
- Devon & Exeter League
  - Premier Division champions 1961–62, 1963–64
  - Division One champions 1959–60, 1978–79
  - Division Two champions 1972–73
- East Devon League
  - Senior Division One champions 1950–51, 1978–79
- East Devon Senior Cup
  - Winners 1983–84

== Records ==
- Best FA Cup performance: Extra preliminary round, 2009–10
- Best FA Vase performance: Second round, 2011–12, 2016–17, 2022–23

== See also ==
- Cullompton Rangers F.C. players
- Cullompton Rangers F.C. managers
- Cullompton Rangers L.F.C.
