= Torpoint A.F.C. =

Association football club in England

Coordinates: 50°22′24″N 4°12′32″W

Torpoint AFC
- Full name: Torpoint Athletic Football Club
- Nickname: The Point
- Founded: 1887
- Ground: The Mill, Torpoint
- Chairman: Lambert Keise
- Manager: Dean Cardew and Karl Curtis
- League: Western League Premier Division
- 2025–26: Western League Premier Division, 2nd of 18
- Website: www.torpointafc.co.uk
Home colours

Torpoint Athletic Football Club is a football club based in Torpoint, Cornwall, England. They are currently members of the Western League Premier Division and play at The Mill.

== History ==
The club was formed as a merger of Torpoint Triumph and Torpoint Defiance. They won the Cornwall Senior Cup, the Cornwall Charity Cup and the Plymouth & District League in 1905–06, and retained the Senior Cup the following season, before winning it again in 1908–09 and 1909–10. After World War I the club won the Senior Cup in 1919–20, 1921–22, 1922–23, 1928–29 and 1932–33.

In 1962 Torpoint joined the South Western League, going on to win the league title in 1964–65 and 1966–67. They were runners-up in the league in 1995–96, a season which also saw them win the Cornwall Senior Cup for the first time since the 1930s. In 2003–04 the club won the League Cup.

In 2007 the South Western League merged with the Devon County League to form the South West Peninsula League, with Torpoint placed in the Premier Division. Following league reorganisation at the end of the 2018–19 season, the club were moved to the Premier Division East.

In the 2021/22 season Torpoint Athletic became South West Peninsula Premier Division East Champions, the first time the 1st team have won a league championship for 55 years, the last time was in 1967 with Les Cardew as manager, his grandson Dean Cardew then managed the side to the League Championship. In the Cup Competitions they got to the FA Vase 2nd Round Proper, competed in the Cornwall Senior Cup and won the Walter C Parson Cup Final, beating St Blazey 3–1 at Pennygillam, completing a League & League Cup double. They lost the SWPL Champions Bowl 4–2 to Falmouth Town (SWPL West Champions) at Bodmin Town.

== Honours ==
- South West Peninsula Premier Division East
  - Champions: 2021–22
- Walter C Parson SWPL League Cup
  - Winners: 2021–22
- South West Peninsula Champions Bowl
  - Runners-up: 2022
- South Western League
  - Champions: 1964–65, 1966–67
- Plymouth & District League
  - Champions: 1905–06
- Cornwall Senior Cup
  - Winners: 1905–06, 1906–07, 1908–09, 1909–10, 1919–20, 1921–22, 1922–23, 1928–29, 1932–33, 1995–96
- Cornwall Charity Cup
  - Winners: 1905–06, 1909–10, 1910–11, 1920–21, 1936–37, 1967–68, 1968–69, 1995–96

== Records ==
- Best FA Cup performance: Second qualifying round, 2025–26
- Best FA Vase performance: Quarter-finals, 2010–11
