= 2015–16 FA Vase =

Football Association Vase

Tournament details
- Country: England; Wales

Final positions
- Champions: Morpeth Town (1st title)
- Runners-up: Hereford

The 2015–16 FA Vase is the 42nd season of the FA Vase, an annual football competition for teams playing below Step 4 of the English National League System. The competition is to be played with two qualifying rounds preceding the six proper rounds, semi-finals (played over two legs) and final to be played at Wembley Stadium. All ties before the semi-finals are played with extra-time if drawn, with penalty kicks if still drawn after extra-time in the return fixture (or after the first match if both clubs agree). Therefore, all matches listed as draws were finished after extra time.

The winners were Morpeth Town, who beat Hereford 4–1 on 22 May at Wembley Stadium.

== Calendar ==
The calendar for the 2015–16 FA Vase qualifying rounds, as announced by The Football Association.

Round	Date	Matches	Clubs	New entries this round	Prize money
First round qualifying	5 September 2015	176	572 → 396	352	£600
Second round qualifying	3 October 2015	169	396 → 227	162	£800
First round proper	31 October 2015	99	227 → 128	29	£900
Second round proper	21 November 2015	64	128 → 64	29	£1,000
Third round proper	12 December 2015	32	64 → 32	none	£1,300
Fourth round proper	9 January 2016	16	32 → 16	none	£2,000
Fifth round proper	30 January 2016	8	16 → 8	none	£2,500
Quarter-finals	20 February 2016	4	8 → 4	none	£4,500
Semi-finals	12 March and 19 March 2016	2	4 → 2	none	£6,000
Final	22 May 2016	1	2 → 1	none	Runner-up £17,000 Winner £25,000

== First round qualifying ==
Tie	Home team (tier)	Score	Away team (tier)	Att.
1	Garforth Town (9)	4–1	Albion Sports (9)	89
2	Willington (10)	2–6	Whitley Bay (9)	128
3	Norton & Stockton Ancients (9)	2–1	Pickering Town (9)	50
4	Sunderland Ryhope (10)	1–4	Darlington Railway Athletic (10)	41
5	Brandon United (10)	2–7	Washington (9)	47
6	Silsden (9)	3–1	Thornaby (10)	88
7	Crook Town (10)	0–2	West Auckland Town (9)	146
8	Hebburn Town (10)	4–1	Knaresborough Town (10)	93
9	Seaham Red Star (9)	3–1	Billingham Town (10)	85
10	Esh Winning (10)	2–3 (a.e.t.)	Hall Road Rangers (10)	54
11	Morpeth Town (9)	4–1	Padiham (9)	136
12	Durham City (9)	3–1	Northallerton Town (10)	100
13	Billingham Synthonia (10)	2–2	Alnwick Town (10)	78
replay	Alnwick Town (10)	1–2	Billingham Synthonia (10)	100
14	Ryton & Crawcrook Albion (10)	1–2	Yorkshire Amateur (10)	67
15	Eccleshill United (10)	2–4	Heaton Stannington (10)	75
16	Penrith (9)	1–2	Bridlington Town (9)	110
17	Thackley (9)	0–0	Whickham (10)	67
replay	Whickham (10)	2–2 (3–1 p)	Thackley (9)	92
18	Birtley Town (10)	0–5	Chester-le-Street (10)	118
19	Liversedge (9)	1–4	Team Northumbria (10)	91
20	Brigg Town (9)	3–4	Westella VIP (10)	80
21	Vauxhall Motors (11)	5–0	Glasshoughton Welfare (10)	65
22	Staveley Miners Welfare (9)	3–4	Cheadle Town (10)	139
23	Handsworth Parramore (9)	1–0	AFC Liverpool (9)	105
24	West Didsbury & Chorlton AFC (9)	2–1	Barton Town Old Boys (9)	85
25	Bacup Borough (10)	4–0	Worsborough Bridge Athletic (10)	57
26	Rossington Main (10)	4–2	Pontefract Collieries (10)	122
27	Winterton Rangers (10)	0–4	St Helens Town (10)	37
28	Bottesford Town (10)	4–1	Appleby Frodingham (11)	88
29	Hemsworth Miners Welfare (10)	3–1	Cammell Laird 1907 (9)	69
30	AFC Blackpool (9)	0–3	Maltby Main (9)	44
31	Squires Gate (9)	2–2	Irlam (10)	37
replay	Irlam (10)	1–3	Squires Gate (9)	80
32	Ashton Athletic (9)	0–0	Atherton Collieries (9)	134
replay	Atherton Collieries (9)	3–1	Ashton Athletic (9)	190
33	Selby Town (10)	12–0	Askern (11)	98
34	Runcorn Town (9)	4–2	Litherland REMYCA (10)	67
35	Congleton Town (9)	3–1	Nostell Miners Welfare (9)	147
36	Parkgate (9)	5–6 (a.e.t.)	Rochdale Town (10)	52
37	Ashby Ivanhoe (10)	0–2	Racing Club Warwick (10)	131
38	AFC Wulfrunians (9)	2–1	Pershore Town (10)	66
39	Gornal Athletic (10)	0–4	Littleton (10)	38
40	Paget Rangers (11)	2–3	Studley (10)	74
41	Stafford Town (10)	2–0	Wednesfield (10)	70
42	Bewdley Town (10)	1–2	Bilston Town (10)	63
43	Lutterworth Athletic (10)	0–5	Pilkington XXX (10)	68
44	Heath Hayes (10)	1–4	Bromsgrove Sporting (10)	135
45	Wolverhampton Casuals (10)	2–1	Southam United (10)	49
46	Pegasus Juniors (10)	0–4	Stourport Swifts (9)	84
47	Lye Town (9)	3–0	Barnt Green Spartak (11)	85
48	Coventry Copsewood (10)	1–4 (a.e.t.)	Bardon Hill Sports (10)	47
49	Wolverhampton SC (10)	0–5	Hinckley (10)	
50	Highgate United (9)	5–0	Tipton Town (9)	69
51	Westfields (9)	1–0	Atherstone Town (10)	134
52	Cadbury Athletic (10)	0–2	AFC Bridgnorth (10)	33
53	Shawbury United (10)	2–3 (a.e.t.)	Nuneaton Griff (10)	59
54	Shifnal Town (11)	1–4	Malvern Town (10)	69
55	Hanley Town (10)	1–3 (a.e.t.)	Coventry United (10)	114
56	Dudley Town (10)	0–3	Sporting Khalsa (9)	99
57	Heather St John's (10)	1–8	Rocester (9)	50
58	Aston (11)	W.O.	Black Country Rangers (10)	
59	Alvechurch (9)	3–1	Lichfield City (10)	97
60	Continental Star (9)	2–3	Ellistown & Ibstock United (10)	46
61	Anstey Nomads (10)	4–2	Friar Lane & Epworth (11)	76
62	Arnold Town (10)	2–1	Gedling Miners Welfare (10)	79
63	Belper United (11)	2–4 (a.e.t.)	Clifton All Whites (11)	58
64	Blaby & Whetstone Athletic (10)	1–4	Retford United (9)	52
65	Shirebrook Town (10)	5–2	Oakham United (10)	68
66	Eastwood Community (11)	1–3	Harrowby United (9)	86
67	Borrowash Victoria (10)	3–1 (a.e.t.)	Kimberley Miners Welfare (10)	50
68	Hucknall Town (11)	4–0	Stapenhill (10)	109
69	Ollerton Town (11)	1–2	St Andrews (10)	85
70	Quorn (9)	3–0	Rainworth Miners Welfare (9)	105
71	Radcliffe Olympic (10)	2–0	Holbrook Sports (10)	24
72	Shepshed Dynamo (9)	1–3	Loughborough University (9)	136
73	Leicester Road (10)	2–0	Harborough Town (9)	55
74	Peterborough Sports (10)	2–3 (a.e.t.)	Sleaford Town (9)	76
75	Boston Town (9)	2–4	Great Yarmouth Town (10)	65
76	St Neots Town Saints (10)	2–1	Team Bury (10)	42
77	Downham Town (10)	4–1	Huntingdon Town (9)	38
78	Thetford Town (9)	2–3	Blackstones (10)	62
79	Ipswich Wanderers (9)	7–0	London Bari (9)	119
80	Tower Hamlets (9)	1–3	Whitton United (9)	47
81	Codicote (10)	1–4	Clapton (9)	64
82	Sporting Bengal United (9)	1–1	Burnham Ramblers (9)	38
replay	Burnham Ramblers (9)	2–4	Sporting Bengal United (9)	39
83	Baldock Town (10)	3–2	St. Margaretsbury (9)	63
84	Cockfosters (9)	3–3	Greenhouse Sports (9)	93
replay	Greenhouse Sports (9)	3–2	Cockfosters (9)	73
85	Welwyn Garden City (9)	1–0 (a.e.t.)	Haverhill Borough (10)	105
86	Debenham LC (10)	2–1 (a.e.t.)	Enfield 1893 (9)	50
87	FC Clacton (9)	2–0	Stansted (9)	94
88	Hadley (9)	2–1	Felixstowe & Walton United (9)	38

Tie	Home team (tier)	Score	Away team (tier)	Att.
89	Brantham Athletic (9)	1–0 (a.e.t.)	Sawbridgeworth Town (9)	75
90	Halstead Town (10)	1–0	Haverhill Rovers (9)	118
91	Hadleigh United (9)	7–0	Eton Manor (9)	96
92	Long Melford (9)	3–1	Cornard United (10)	112
93	Long Buckby (9)	3–1	Spelthorne Sports (9)	38
94	Northampton ON Chenecks (10)	2–1	Sun Postal Sports (9)	60
95	Broadfields United (10)	2–4	Harpenden Town (10)	20
96	Berkhamsted (9)	4–1	Woodford United (10)	78
97	Holmer Green (9)	2–7	Wellingborough Town (9)	34
98	Southall (10)	2–1	Bedfont & Feltham (10)	87
99	Newport Pagnell Town (9)	0–2 (a.e.t.)	AFC Kempston Rovers (9)	155
100	Wellingborough Whitworths (10)	3–6	Edgware Town (10)	62
101	Langford (10)	0–3	Bedfont Sports (9)	40
102	Thrapston Town (10)	1–3	Northampton Sileby Rangers (9)	80
103	Hillingdon Borough (10)	1–2	Potton United (10)	39
104	Ampthill Town (10)	1–2	London Tigers (9)	50
105	Burton Park Wanderers (10)	0–0	Tring Athletic (9)	46
replay	Tring Athletic (9)	4–0	Burton Park Wanderers (10)	107
106	New Bradwell St Peter (11)	2–0 (a.e.t.)	Rushden & Higham United (10)	68
107	Stotfold (9)	3–1	Bugbrooke St Michaels (10)	52
108	Hanworth Villa (9)	1–0 (a.e.t.)	Desborough Town (9)	108
109	Irchester United (10)	0–4	Risborough Rangers (10)	90
110	Rothwell Corinthians (9)	1–0	Bedford (10)	49
111	Chertsey Town (9)	5–1	Tuffley Rovers (9)	52
112	Fairford Town (10)	3–0	Ardley United (9)	39
113	Shrivenham (9)	3–2	Reading Town (10)	42
114	Royal Wootton Bassett Town (9)	1–1	Binfield (9)	83
replay	Binfield (9)	3–4	Royal Wootton Bassett Town (9)	122
115	Bracknell Town (9)	1–0	Hook Norton (10)	59
116	Thatcham Town (9)	7–0	New College Swindon (10)	129
117	Abbey Rangers (10)	0–0	Holyport (10)	43
replay	Holyport (10)	1–4	Abbey Rangers (10)	60
118	Oxford City Nomads (9)	4–0	Buckingham Town (10)	87
119	Cheltenham Saracens (10)	1–2	Brimscombe & Thrupp (9)	63
120	Lydney Town (9)	5–0	Abingdon United (9)	91
121	Frimley Green (9)	3–2	Fleet Spurs (10)	40
122	Tadley Calleva (10)	6–0	Woodley United (10)	71
123	Hartley Wintney (9)	3–2	Longlevens (9)	98
124	Carterton (10)	6–0	Chinnor (10)	35
125	Ash United (10)	0–2	Windsor (9)	71
126	Horsham (9)	3–0	Epsom & Ewell (9)	184
127	Horsham YMCA (9)	3–2	FC Elmstead (10)	55
128	Deal Town (9)	1–0	Dorking (10)	80
129	Southwick (10)	0–3	Lordswood (9)	
130	Bexhill United (10)	0–2	AFC Croydon Athletic (9)	67
131	Raynes Park Vale (9)	2–4	Croydon (9)	
132	Banstead Athletic (10)	2–2	Seven Acre & Sidcup (10)	55
replay	Seven Acre & Sidcup (10)	1–2	Banstead Athletic (10)	48
133	Corinthian (9)	4–1	Chessington & Hook United (9)	27
134	Haywards Heath Town (10)	2–1	Little Common (10)	76
135	Chichester City (9)	0–2	Erith Town (9)	58
136	Worthing United (9)	2–1	East Preston (9)	1,008
137	Canterbury City (9)	1–0	Ringmer (9)	36
138	Cobham (10)	2–1 (a.e.t.)	Shoreham (9)	66
139	Sevenoaks Town (9)	5–0	Horley Town (9)	57
140	Glebe (10)	W.O.	Eastbourne United (9)	
141	AFC Uckfield Town (10)	1–5	Beckenham Town (9)	60
142	Steyning Town (10)	6–2	Wick & Barnham United (9)	110
143	Crawley Down Gatwick (9)	1–3	Fisher (9)	61
144	Mile Oak (9)	3–1	Seaford Town (10)	46
145	Loxwood (9)	2–0	Crowborough Athletic (9)	53
146	Newhaven (9)	1–0	Guildford City (9)	74
147	Bridon Ropes (10)	1–1	Holmesdale (9)	53
replay	Holmesdale (9)	1–3	Bridon Ropes (10)	59
148	Andover New Street (10)	1–4	Bitton (9)	26
149	Salisbury (9)	8–1	Wincanton Town (10)	625
150	Devizes Town (10)	0–2	Shaftesbury Town (11)	68
151	Team Solent (9)	4–1 (a.e.t.)	Christchurch (10)	59
152	Alresford Town (9)	0–5	Blackfield & Langley (9)	54
153	Oldland Abbotonians (10)	3–0	Downton (10)	21
154	Corsham Town (10)	5–1	Westbury United (10)	62
155	Andover Town (9)	7–2	Fawley (9)	92
156	Bournemouth (9)	4–3	Brockenhurst (9)	50
157	East Cowes Victoria Athletic (10)	0–9	Lymington Town (9)	39
158	Whitchurch United (9)	3–0	Hamworthy United (9)	28
159	Cadbury Heath (9)	3–0	Amesbury Town (10)	53
160	Winterbourne United (9)	4–4	Horndean (9)	45
replay	Horndean (9)	3–0	Winterbourne United (9)	57
161	Cribbs (9)	1–2	Hallen (9)	68
162	Warminster Town (10)	3–0	Pewsey Vale (10)	96
163	Verwood Town (9)	3–2 (a.e.t.)	Fareham Town (9)	65
164	Sherborne Town (9)	2–3	Bemerton Heath Harlequins (9)	58
165	Roman Glass St George (10)	3–3	Calne Town (10)	65
replay	Calne Town (10)	2–0 (a.e.t.)	Roman Glass St George (10)	42
166	Witheridge (10)	1–0	Cullompton Rangers (10)	73
167	Falmouth Town (10)	0–1	Newquay (10)	81
168	Plymouth Parkway (10)	5–1	Street (9)	134
169	Ivybridge Town (10)	7–0	Porthleven (11)	101
170	Budleigh Salterton (11)	3–5	Welton Rovers (9)	80
171	Shepton Mallet (9)	3–1	Cheddar (10)	98
172	Ashton & Backwell United (10)	2–1 (a.e.t.)	Brislington (9)	60
173	St Blazey (10)	2–0	Bovey Tracey (11)	64
174	Saltash United (10)	3–4 (a.e.t.)	Exmouth Town (10)	49
175	Portishead Town (10)	2–0	Elburton Villa (10)	44
176	Camelford (10)	2–1	Clevedon Town (10)	51

== Second round qualifying ==
Tie	Home team	Score	Away team	Att.
1	Easington Colliery (10)	1–2	Ashington (9)	
2	South Shields (10)	2–1	Washington (9)	462
3	Tow Law Town (10)	0–3	Stokesley SC (10)	60
4	Chester-Le-Street Town (10)	4–3 (a.e.t.)	Heaton Stannington (10)	131
5	Darlington Railway Athletic (10)	3–1	Hall Road Rangers (10)	42
6	Billingham Synthonia (10)	0–1	Morpeth Town (9)	123
7	Sunderland RCA (9)	3–2 (a.e.t.)	Bridlington Town (9)	84
8	Silsden (9)	6–0	Daisy Hill (10)	74
9	Whickham (10)	0–1	Garforth Town (9)	60
10	Bedlington Terriers (9)	2–4 (a.e.t.)	Durham City (9)	
11	Jarrow Roofing Boldon CA (9)	0–1	Seaham Red Star (9)	70
12	Hebburn Town (10)	3–1	Yorkshire Amateur (10)	53
13	Bishop Auckland (9)	7–1	Holker Old Boys (10)	251
14	Norton & Stockton Ancients (9)	1–4	Newcastle Benfield (9)	57
15	AFC Darwen (9)	2–4 (a.e.t.)	West Auckland Town (9)	116
16	Whitley Bay (9)	5–1	West Allotment Celtic (9)	312
17	Newton Aycliffe (9)	3–0	Barnoldswick Town (9)	63
18	Nelson (9)	1–3 (a.e.t.)	Team Northumbria (10)	100
19	Runcorn Town (9)	4–1	Barnton (10)	91
20	Vauxhall Motors (11)	2–3	Abbey Hey (9)	51
21	AFC Emley (10)	3–4	Congleton Town (9)	139
22	Dronfield Town (10)	2–1	Bootle (9)	63
23	Handsworth Parramore (9)	3–2	Cheadle Town (10)	86
24	Armthorpe Welfare (9)	3–2	Ashton Town (10)	41
25	Rochdale Town (10)	6–2	St Helens Town (10)	60
26	Westella VIP(10)	1–3	Selby Town (10)	73
27	Bacup Borough (10)	0–1	Hemsworth Miners Welfare (10)	69
28	Atherton Collieries (9)	6–2	Atherton Laburnum Rovers (10)	429
29	West Didsbury & Chorlton AFC (9)	15–1	Dinnington Town (11)	84
30	Squires Gate (9)	0–2	Winsford United (9)	36
31	Northwich Manchester Villa (10)	3–1	Rossington Main (10)	56
32	Penistone Church (10)	0–2	Athersley Recreation (9)	184
33	Maltby Main (9)	2–0	Bottesford Town (10)	64
34	Hallam (10)	4–3	Harworth Colliery (11)	72
35	Alsager Town (9)	3–1	Maine Road (9)	81
36	Bardon Hill (9)	0–1	Hereford (9)	240
37	Bilston Town (10)	1–3	AFC Wulfrunians (9)	146
38	Hinckley (10)	6–0	Bromyard Town (10)	198
39	Ellesmere Rangers (10)	2–1	Malvern Town (10)	43
40	Boldmere St. Michaels (9)	4–0	Stafford Town (10)	59
41	Coventry United (10)	2–0	Studley (10)	113
42	Uttoxeter Town (11)	4–3 (a.e.t.)	Bolehall Swifts (10)	70
43	Stone Old Alleynians (10)	0–4	Racing Club Warwick(10)	30
44	Sporting Khalsa (9)	4–0	Wellington (10)	39
45	Pilkington XXX (10)	0–4	Alvechurch (9)	96
46	Stourport Swifts (9)	1–3	Black Country Rangers (10)	99
47	Eccleshall (10)	0–0 (1–4 p)	Haughmond (10)	63
48	Highgate United (9)	5–2	Wolverhampton Casuals (10)	61
49	AFC Bridgnorth (10)	5–2	Willenhall Town (10)	78
50	Westfields (9)	3–2	Littleton (10)	130
51	Rocester (9)	5–1	Kirby Muxloe (9)	67
52	Coton Green (11)	1–8	Nuneaton Griff (10)	96
53	Bromsgrove Sporting (10)	3–1	Dudley Sports (10)	261
54	Lye Town (9)	2–4	Cradley Town (10)	129
55	Coventry Sphinx (9)	4–3	Ellistown & Ibstock United (10)	67
56	Retford United (9)	0–2	Loughborough University (9)	72
57	Anstey Nomads (10)	2–0	Clifton All Whites (11)	86
58	Holwell Sports (10)	1–3	Dunkirk (9)	65
59	Radford (10)	2–1	South Normanton Athletic (10)	52
60	Teversal (10)	1–3	Radcliffe Olympic (10)	42
61	Oadby Town (9)	1–4	Borrowash Victoria (10)	142
62	Harrowby United (9)	1–0	Leicester Road (10)	95
63	Greenwood Meadows (10)	1–4	Clipstone (9)	30
64	Aylestone Park (10)	3–5	St Andrews (10)	65
65	Mickleover Royals (10)	W.O.	Shirebrook Town (10)	
66	Blidworth Welfare (11)	2–1	Graham Street Prims (10)	
67	Lincoln Moorlands Railway (10)	1–4	Pinxton (11)	35
68	Barrow Town (10)	0–3	Quorn (9)	118
69	Arnold Town (10)	0–2	Hucknall Town (11)	134
70	Blackstones (10)	1–0 (a.e.t.)	Peterborough Northern Star (9)	78
71	Great Yarmouth Town (10)	1–0 (a.e.t.)	Deeping Rangers (9)	104
72	Mildenhall Town (9)	7–0	St Neots Town Saints (10)	109
73	Swaffham Town (9)	2–1	Bourne Town (10)	66
74	Gorleston (9)	3–2	Walsham-le-Willows (9)	112
75	Wisbech St Mary (11)	1–3 (a.e.t.)	Diss Town (10)	144
76	Ely City (10)	1–2	Newmarket Town (9)	103
77	Downham Town (10)	0–2	Sleaford Town (9)	65
78	Eynesbury Rovers (9)	3–1	Fakenham Town (9)	49
79	Sporting Bengal United (9)	4–0	Halstead Town (10)	41
80	Ipswich Wanderers (9)	2–0	Clapton (9)	154
81	Takeley (9)	1–1	Hoddesdon Town (9)	111
replay	Hoddesdon Town (9)	2–0	Takeley (9)	98
82	Woodbridge Town (10)	2–3	Ilford (9)	74
83	Brimsdown (10)	2–4	Brantham Athletic (9)	60
84	Waltham Forest (9)	2–5	Welwyn Garden City (9)	57
85	Greenhouse Sports (9)	3–0	Hadleigh United (9)	42
86	Stowmarket Town (10)	1–4	Hertford Town (9)	105
87	Newbury Forest (11)	0–7	FC Clacton (9)	61

Tie	Home team (tier)	Score	Away team (tier)	Att.
88	FC Romania (9)	2–1	Baldock Town (10)	45
89	FC Broxbourne Borough (9)	3–1	Long Melford (9)	62
90	Wivenhoe Town (10)	0–1	Basildon United (9)	66
91	Southend Manor (9)	1–1	Hadley (9)	43
replay	Hadley (9)	3–2	Southend Manor (9)	44
92	Whitton United (9)	2–1 (a.e.t.)	Debenham LC (10)	55
93	Raunds Town (10)	1–0	Wellingborough Town (9)	71
94	Edgware Town (10)	6–0	Winslow United (10)	67
95	AFC Kempston Rovers (9)	3–0	Long Buckby (9)	68
96	Wembley (9)	3–2	Potton United (10)	50
97	Rothwell Corinthians (9)	3–3	Tring Athletic (9)	59
replay	Tring Athletic (9)	2–1	Rothwell Corinthians (9)	99
98	Northampton Sileby Rangers (9)	7–2	New Bradwell St Peter (11)	36
99	Cricklewood Wanderers (11)	1–0	Risborough Rangers (10)	169
100	Hanworth Villa (9)	2–1	Oxhey Jets (9)	62
101	Southall (10)	2–0	CB Hounslow United (10)	80
102	Berkhamsted (9)	2–1	Northampton ON Chenecks (10)	104
103	London Tigers (9)	4–2	Crawley Green (10)	14
104	Rayners Lane (10)	1–3	Stotfold (9)	60
105	Cogenhoe United (9)	3–1	AFC Hayes (9)	47
106	Bedfont Sports (9)	4–0	Buckingham Athletic (10)	
107	Biggleswade United (9)	2–1 (a.e.t.)	Leverstock Green (9)	91
108	Northampton Spencer (9)	3–2	Harpenden Town (10)	62
109	Westfield (9)	1–2	Carterton (10)	38
110	Frimley Green (9)	2–7	Thame United (9)	32
111	Henley Town (10)	1–5	Oxford City Nomads (9)	83
112	Alton Town (10)	1–1	Bracknell Town (9)	86
replay	Bracknell Town (9)	0–3	Alton Town (10)	81
113	Abbey Rangers (10)	1–1	Tytherington Rocks (10)	56
replay	Tytherington Rocks (10)	0–3	Abbey Rangers (10)	81
114	Fairford Town (10)	4–2	Badshot Lea (9)	30
115	Chertsey Town (9)	0–2	Tadley Calleva (10)	82
116	Windsor (9)	2–1 (a.e.t.)	Royal Wootton Bassett Town (9)	106
117	Wokingham & Emmbrook (9)	6–1	Shrivenham (9)	48
118	Hartley Wintney (9)	4–1	Milton United (9)	102
119	Thatcham Town (9)	0–2	Brimscombe & Thrupp (9)	69
120	Malmesbury Victoria (11)	2–2 (2–4 p)	Farnham Town (9)	60
121	Knaphill (9)	3–1	Lydney Town (9)	41
122	Canterbury City (9)	2–0	Tooting & Mitcham Wanderers (11)	40
123	Croydon (9)	2–1	Horsham YMCA (9)	63
124	Cobham (10)	0–3	Sutton Common Rovers (9)	64
125	Hailsham Town (9)	3–0	Fisher (9)	74
126	Hollands & Blair (9)	0–3	AFC Croydon Athletic (9)	82
127	Mile Oak (9)	2–4	Lordswood (9)	47
128	St Francis Rangers (9)	2–7	Meridian VP (10)	20
129	Selsey (10)	0–3	Horsham (9)	152
130	Loxwood (9)	2–1	Arundel (9)	62
131	Banstead Athletic (10)	2–6	Cray Valley (PM) (9)	35
132	Erith Town (9)	1–2 (a.e.t.)	Bridon Ropes (10)	50
133	Oakwood (10)	4–9 (a.e.t.)	Lancing (9)	35
134	Sevenoaks Town (9)	3–4	Haywards Heath Town (10)	88
135	Beckenham Town (9)	2–0	Redhill (9)	60
136	Eastbourne United (9)	0–3	Deal Town (9)	112
137	Newhaven (9)	3–2	Broadbridge Heath (9)	72
138	Rochester United (9)	0–1	Steyning Town (10)	60
139	Corinthian (9)	4–0	Lingfield (10)	41
140	Worthing United (9)	3–0	Epsom Athletic (10)	38
141	Sheppey United (10)	0–3	Gravesham Borough (10)	126
142	Warminster Town (10)	0–5	Gillingham Town (9)	116
143	Salisbury (9)	4–1	Folland Sports (9)	538
144	New Milton Town (10)	3–2	Verwood Town (9)	59
145	Romsey Town (10)	0–2	Calne Town (10)	72
146	Team Solent (9)	3–0	Shaftesbury Town (11)	28
147	Laverstock & Ford (10)	2–0	Cowes Sports (10)	40
148	Bemerton Heath Harlequins (9)	0–3	Andover Town (9)	62
149	Bitton (9)	2–3	Hallen (9)	61
150	Oldland Abbotonians (10)	0–1 (a.e.t.)	Lymington Town (9)	34
151	Horndean (9)	1–1	Longwell Green Sports (9)	
replay	Longwell Green Sports (9)	1–3	Horndean (9)	61
152	Blackfield & Langley (9)	6–2	Ringwood Town (10)	64
153	Cadbury Heath (9)	2–1 (a.e.t.)	Almondsbury UWE (10)	50
154	Swanage Town & Herston (11)	3–4	Corsham Town (10)	
155	Chippenham Park (10)	0–1	Newport IW (9)	47
156	Whitchurch United (9)	6–0	Bournemouth (9)	52
157	Sholing (9)	1–1	United Services Portsmouth (10)	101
replay	United Services Portsmouth (10)	0–6	Sholing (9)	52
158	Bridport (9)	5–1	Hythe & Dibden (10)	75
159	Radstock Town (10)	3–3 (4–5 p)	Hengrove Athletic (10)	58
160	Shepton Mallet (9)	1–2 (a.e.t.)	Camelford (10)	104
161	Exmouth Town (10)	0–2	Welton Rovers (9)	88
162	Ivybridge Town (10)	1–4	Barnstaple Town (9)	92
163	Newquay (10)	1–1 (4–5 p)	Odd Down (9)	
164	Wadebridge Town (11)	2–5	Portishead Town (10)	51
165	Crediton United (11)	1–2	Bishop Sutton (10)	48
166	Willand Rovers (9)	0–2	Plymouth Parkway (10)	78
167	Ashton & Backwell United (10)	0–2	Torpoint Athletic (10)	53
168	Keynsham Town (10)	2–2	Wells City (10)	63
replay	Wells City (10)	2–1 (a.e.t.)	Keynsham Town (10)	61
169	Witheridge (10)	10–1	St Blazey (10)	58

== First round proper ==
Tie	Home team (tier)	Score	Away team (tier)	Att.
1	West Didsbury & Chorlton AFC (9)	4–5	Morpeth Town (9)	123
2	Handsworth Parramore (9)	5–4 (a.e.t.)	Shildon (9)	144
3	Guisborough Town (9)	8–0	Armthorpe Welfare (9)	112
4	Atherton Collieries (9)	2–0	Newcastle Benfield (9)	172
5	Stokesley SC (10)	1–4 (a.e.t.)	Maltby Main (9)	25
6	Silsden (9)	2–4	Sunderland RCA (9)	115
7	Rochdale Town (10)	2–4	1874 Northwich (9)	142
8	Runcorn Linnets (9)	2–1	Winsford United (9)	231
9	Team Northumbria (10)	4–0	Darlington Railway Athletic (10)	50
10	Congleton Town (9)	1–5	Marske United (9)	186
11	Athersley Recreation (9)	1–5	Colne (9)	90
12	Durham City (9)	0–1	Seaham Red Star (9)	
13	Dronfield Town (10)	2–3 (a.e.t.)	Ashington (9)	90
14	Chester-Le-Street Town (10)	0–4	Newton Aycliffe (9)	154
15	Selby Town (10)	1–2	Hallam (10)	82
16	Runcorn Town (9)	2–0	Abbey Hey (9)	80
17	Hemsworth Miners Welfare (10)	3–2	West Auckland Town (9)	189
18	Northwich Manchester Villa (10)	1–1	Whitley Bay (9)	103
replay	Whitley Bay (9)	3–1	Northwich Manchester Villa (10)	340
19	Garforth Town (9)	1–0	Hebburn Town (10)	109
20	Bishop Auckland (9)	1–2	South Shields (10)	844
21	Highgate United (9)	3–1	Radcliffe Olympic (10)	46
22	Loughborough University (9)	0–0	Uttoxeter Town (11)	135
replay	Uttoxeter Town (11)	3–2	Loughborough University (9)	230
23	Dunkirk (9)	2–1	Bromsgrove Sporting (10)	111
24	Pinxton (11)	1–0	Cradley Town (10)	56
25	Rocester (9)	0–2	Hereford (9)	262
26	Coventry Sphinx (9)	1–1	Black Country Rangers (10)	47
replay	Black Country Rangers (10)	4–6 (a.e.t.)	Coventry Sphinx (9)	46
27	Alsager Town (9)	2–2 (5–4 p)	Borrowash Victoria (10)	78
28	Wisbech Town (9)	0–4	Alvechurch (9)	221
29	Cleethorpes Town (9)	2–1	Westfields (9)	106
30	Blackstones (10)	2–3 (a.e.t.)	Haughmond (10)	74
31	Shirebrook Town (10)	2–0	Sporting Khalsa (9)	119
32	Radford (10)	1–3	AFC Bridgnorth (10)	70
33	St Andrews (10)	3–3	Blidworth Welfare (11)	52
replay	Blidworth Welfare (11)	6–0	St Andrews (10)	105
Tie ordered replayed due to Blidworth fielding an ineligible player in both St Andrews ties
replay	St Andrews (10)	2–0 (a.e.t.)	Blidworth Welfare (11)	76
34	Coleshill Town (9)	3–0	Hucknall Town (11)	55
35	AFC Wulfrunians (9)	4–2 (a.e.t.)	Harrowby United (9)	102
36	Racing Club Warwick (10)	3–2	Ellesmere Rangers (10)	44
37	Nuneaton Griff (10)	1–0	Anstey Nomads (10)	86
38	Quorn (9)	1–0	Clipstone (9)	90
39	Boldmere St. Michaels (9)	0–2	Coventry United (10)	114
40	Long Eaton United (9)	2–1 (a.e.t.)	Hinckley (10)	214
41	Stotfold (9)	A–A	Newmarket Town (9)	76
Tie abandoned after injury to Newmarket Town player
41	Stotfold (9)	5–0	Newmarket Town (9)	81
42	Cricklewood Wanderers (11)	1–0	Welwyn Garden City (9)	105
43	Diss Town (10)	2–3	Basildon United (9)	122
44	Barking (9)	4–1	Tring Athletic (9)	58
45	Bowers & Pitsea (9)	3–2	Hanworth Villa (9)	54
46	Hadley (9)	2–3	FC Romania (9)	42
47	Northampton Sileby Rangers (9)	5–4	Wembley (9)	52
48	Brantham Athletic (9)	0–4	Kirkley & Pakefield (9)	40

Tie	Home team (tier)	Score	Away team (tier)	Att.
49	Gorleston (9)	6–3 (a.e.t.)	London Tigers (9)	102
50	Ipswich Wanderers (9)	2–1	Hoddesdon Town (9)	116
51	Berkhamsted (9)	5–1	Northampton Spencer (9)	103
52	London Colney (9)	2–1	Great Yarmouth Town (10)	85
53	AFC Dunstable (9)	2–0 (a.e.t.)	FC Clacton (9)	181
54	Raunds Town (10)	0–1	Sleaford Town (9)	34
55	Hertford Town (9)	4–3	Eynesbury Rovers (9)	192
56	Godmanchester Rovers (9)	1–1	Mildenhall Town (9)	128
replay	Mildenhall Town (9)	2–1	Godmanchester Rovers (9)	147
57	Ilford (9)	0–1	AFC Kempston Rovers (9)	68
58	Sporting Bengal United (9)	6–2	Southall (10)	25
59	Swaffham Town (9)	1–2	FC Broxbourne Borough (9)	94
60	Edgware Town (10)	5–2	Whitton United (9)	102
61	Cogenhoe United (9)	0–2	Biggleswade United (9)	81
62	Harefield United (9)	0–3	Greenhouse Sports (9)	40
63	Eastbourne Town (9)	3–2 (a.e.t.)	Farnham Town (9)	156
64	Hartley Wintney (9)	3–1	Wokingham & Emmbrook (9)	127
65	Worthing United (9)	0–1	Sutton Common Rovers (9)	53
66	Knaphill (9)	5–4 (a.e.t.)	Cray Valley (PM) (9)	89
67	Deal Town (9)	4–2	Oxford City Nomads (9)	120
68	Littlehampton Town (9)	1–2	Tadley Calleva (10)	90
69	Andover Town (9)	1–2	Newhaven (9)	143
70	Cove (9)	0–5	Canterbury City (9)	30
71	Corinthian (9)	2–3	Pagham (9)	60
72	AFC Croydon Athletic (9)	2–2	Beckenham Town (9)	73
replay	Beckenham Town (9)	6–3 (a.e.t.)	AFC Croydon Athletic (9)	145
73	Loxwood (9)	3–1	Highmoor Ibis (9)	47
74	Haywards Heath Town (10)	1–0	Alton Town (10)	115
75	Kidlington (9)	2–2	Ashford Town (Middx) (9)	85
replay	Ashford Town (Middx) (9)	1–3	Kidlington (9)	85
76	Bedfont Sports (9)	1–4	Carterton (10)	42
77	Lancing (9)	1–2	Camberley Town (9)	96
78	Gravesham Borough (10)	0–1	Hailsham Town (9)	67
Tie played at Hailsham Town
79	Windsor (9)	3–2	Croydon (9)	116
80	Steyning Town (10)	1–0 (a.e.t.)	Horsham (9)	280
81	Thame United (9)	4–3	Bridon Ropes (10)	91
82	Meridian VP (10)	1–4	Lordswood (9)	36
83	Bristol Manor Farm (9)	3–0	Bridport (9)	93
84	Plymouth Parkway (10)	6–0	Blackfield & Langley (9)	137
85	Moneyfields (9)	1–0	Corsham Town (10)	60
86	Witheridge (10)	0–1	Hallen (9)	90
87	Horndean (9)	1–3	Barnstaple Town (9)	85
88	Lymington Town (9)	2–0	Wells City (10)	71
89	Calne Town (10)	2–6	Salisbury (9)	303
90	Whitchurch United (9)	2–2	Welton Rovers (9)	48
replay	Welton Rovers (9)	4–0	Whitchurch United (9)	68
91	Team Solent (9)	2–3	Cadbury Heath (9)	47
92	Odd Down (9)	2–1	Camelford (10)	44
93	Portishead Town (10)	1–3	Newport IW (9)	58
94	AFC Portchester (9)	1–2	Abbey Rangers (10)	189
95	Gillingham Town (9)	0–0 (4–5 p)	Hengrove Athletic (10)	66
96	New Milton Town (10)	0–5	Buckland Athletic (9)	59
97	Sholing (9)	3–1	Laverstock & Ford (10)	123
98	Bishop Sutton (10)	0–3	Torpoint Athletic (10)	44
99	Fairford Town (10)	0–1	Brimscombe & Thrupp (9)	81

== Second round proper ==
Tie	Home team (tier)	Score	Away team (tier)	Att.
1	Runcorn Town (9)	3–0	Garforth Town (9)	80
2	North Shields (9)	3–0	Ashington (9)	464
3	Atherton Collieries (9)	3–0	Chadderton (10)	128
4	Morpeth Town (9)	W.O.	1874 Northwich (9)	
5	Colne (9)	3–5 (a.e.t.)	Newton Aycliffe (9)	216
6	Seaham Red Star (9)	3–1	Maltby Main (9)	118
7	Handsworth Parramore (9)	3–2	Hallam (10)	114
8	Hemsworth Miners Welfare (10)	1–5	Sunderland RCA (9)	209
9	Consett (9)	0–1 (a.e.t.)	South Shields (10)	750
10	Whitley Bay (9)	1–2	Dunston UTS (9)	395
11	Marske United (9)	6–2	Runcorn Linnets (9)	205
12	Tadcaster Albion (9)	4–1	Worksop Town (9)	317
13	Guisborough Town (9)	1–2 (a.e.t.)	Team Northumbria (10)	133
14	AFC Mansfield (10)	1–1	Alsager Town (9)	82
replay	Alsager Town (9)	3–1	AFC Mansfield (10)	95
15	Walsall Wood (9)	4–1	Holbeach United (9)	75
16	AFC Bridgnorth (10)	1–2	Alvechurch (9)	79
17	Coventry Sphinx (9)	2–3	Brocton (9)	54
18	Coventry United (10)	1–2	Uttoxeter Town (11)	188
19	Coleshill Town (9)	4–2	Dunkirk (9)	57
20	Hereford (9)	4–1	Haughmond (10)	2,170
21	Long Eaton United (9)	2–3	Pinxton (11)	96
22	Heanor Town (9)	1–3	Leicester Nirvana (9)	156
23	Cleethorpes Town (9)	2–0	Racing Club Warwick (10)	116
24	Quorn (9)	1–2	AFC Wulfrunians (9)	99
25	Nuneaton Griff (10)	1–1	Highgate United (9)	47
replay	Highgate United (9)	2–4	Nuneaton Griff (10)	77
26	St Andrews (10)	4–0	Shirebrook Town (10)	88
27	Stotfold (9)	1–3	AFC Dunstable (9)	83
28	Bowers & Pitsea (9)	3–2	Flackwell Heath (9)	71
29	Yaxley (9)	3–2	London Colney (9)	79
30	Sporting Bengal United (9)	1–3 (a.e.t.)	Sleaford Town (9)	31
31	Gorleston (9)	3–4 (a.e.t.)	FC Romania (9)	110

Tie	Home team (tier)	Score	Away team (tier)	Att.
32	Ipswich Wanderers (9)	1–0	Cricklewood Wanderers (11)	98
33	FC Broxbourne Borough (9)	2–1 (a.e.t.)	Greenhouse Sports (9)	39
34	Norwich United (9)	0–1 (a.e.t.)	Hullbridge Sports (9)	102
35	Hertford Town (9)	3–2	Barking (9)	202
36	Biggleswade United (9)	1–3	Saffron Walden Town (9)	116
37	Kirkley & Pakefield (9)	1–2	Edgware Town (10)	60
38	Basildon United (9)	7–1	Northampton Sileby Rangers (9)	43
39	Stanway Rovers (9)	2–1	Mildenhall Town (9)	97
40	Berkhamsted (9)	3–1	AFC Kempston Rovers (9)	116
41	Sutton Common Rovers (9)	3–2	Beckenham Town (9)	123
42	Knaphill (9)	3–0	Tunbridge Wells (9)	154
43	Newhaven (9)	1–2	Camberley Town (9)	106
44	Ashford United (9)	2–1	Steyning Town (10)	133
45	Eastbourne Town (9)	5–4	Greenwich Borough (9)	138
46	Pagham (9)	0–3	Thame United (9)	71
47	Lordswood (9)	4–1	Carterton (10)	46
48	Hailsham Town (9)	1–4	Ascot United (9)	75
49	Canterbury City (9)	3–2	Erith & Belvedere (9)	70
50	Tadley Calleva (10)	4–0	Haywards Heath Town (10)	105
51	Kidlington (9)	7–0	Deal Town (9)	71
52	Colliers Wood United (9)	2–0	Loxwood (9)	81
53	Hartley Wintney (9)	3–1	Windsor (9)	146
54	Hallen (9)	0–1	Moneyfields (9)	52
55	Highworth Town (9)	2–1	Odd Down (9)	94
56	Salisbury (9)	4–0	AFC St Austell (10)	854
57	Bradford Town (9)	6–3	Cadbury Heath (9)	81
58	Buckland Athletic (9)	2–1 (a.e.t.)	Sholing (9)	139
59	Welton Rovers (9)	1–0	Plymouth Parkway (10)	80
60	Newport IW (9)	3–1 (a.e.t.)	Abbey Rangers (10)	189
61	Bodmin Town (10)	3–1	Melksham Town (9)	147
62	Bristol Manor Farm (9)	2–1	Lymington Town (9)	79
63	Hengrove Athletic (10)	2–1	Barnstaple Town (9)	42
64	Brimscombe & Thrupp (9)	3–2	Torpoint Athletic (10)	86

== Third round proper ==
Tie	Home team (tier)	Score	Away team (tier)	Att.
1	Marske United (9)	2–1	Team Northumbria (10)	193
Tie played at Team Northumbria
2	Sunderland RCA (9)	4–0	Tadcaster Albion (9)	165
3	Newton Aycliffe (9)	1–0	Atherton Collieries (9)	127
4	South Shields (10)	3–3 (9–10 p)	Morpeth Town (9)	359
Tie played at Consett
5	North Shields (9)	1–1	Runcorn Town (9)	346
replay	Runcorn Town (9)	0–1	North Shields (9)	178
6	Dunston UTS (9)	1–0	Seaham Red Star (9)	207
7	Alsager Town (9)	0–2	AFC Wulfrunians (9)	132
8	St Andrews (10)	1–5	Leicester Nirvana (9)	153
9	Handsworth Parramore (9)	1–2	Cleethorpes Town (9)	101
10	Pinxton (11)	3–4	Nuneaton Griff (10)	135
11	Walsall Wood (9)	0–3	Alvechurch (9)	131
12	Uttoxeter Town (11)	3–4	Coleshill Town (9)	214
13	Hereford (9)	2–0	Brocton (9)	2,025
14	Saffron Walden Town (9)	2–3	Berkhamsted (9)	323
15	FC Broxbourne Borough (9)	1–3	Bowers & Pitsea (9)	69
16	Hullbridge Sports (9)	2–0	Stanway Rovers (9)	89

Tie	Home team (tier)	Score	Away team (tier)	Att.
17	AFC Dunstable (9)	4–0	Basildon United (9)	87
18	Edgware Town (10)	0–3	Ipswich Wanderers (9)	137
19	Yaxley (9)	3–4 (a.e.t.)	Sleaford Town (9)	108
20	Hertford Town (9)	0–2	FC Romania (9)	231
21	Colliers Wood United (9)	1–3	Hartley Wintney (9)	40
22	Thame United (9)	1–2	Kidlington (9)	132
23	Ascot United (9)	0–0	Camberley Town (9)	240
replay	Camberley Town (9)	4–1	Ascot United (9)	194
24	Lordswood (9)	1–5	Ashford United (9)	90
25	Eastbourne Town (9)	2–3	Sutton Common Rovers (9)	142
26	Tadley Calleva (10)	2–2	Newport IW (9)	105
replay	Newport IW (9)	4–2 (a.e.t.)	Tadley Calleva (10)	164
27	Canterbury City (9)	1–3	Knaphill (9)	81
28	Moneyfields (9)	0–0	Brimscombe & Thrupp (9)	70
replay	Brimscombe & Thrupp (9)	0–2	Moneyfields (9)	152
29	Buckland Athletic (9)	1–2	Bradford Town (9)	149
30	Highworth Town (9)	1–5	Salisbury (9)	357
31	Welton Rovers (9)	0–2	Bodmin Town (10)	117
32	Bristol Manor Farm (9)	7–1	Hengrove Athletic (10)	131

== Fourth round proper ==
Tie	Home team (tier)	Score	Away team (tier)	Att.
1	Cleethorpes Town (9)	2–1	Alvechurch (9)	252
2	Hereford (9)	A–A	Leicester Nirvana (9)	2,678
Tie abandoned at halftime (3–1) due to waterlogged pitch
2	Hereford (9)	6–0	Leicester Nirvana (9)	2,842
3	Morpeth Town (9)	2–0	North Shields (9)	479
Tie played at North Shields
4	Coleshill Town (9)	1–3 (a.e.t.)	Dunston UTS (9)	223
5	AFC Wulfrunians (9)	2–3	Nuneaton Griff (10)	182
6	Sunderland RCA (9)	3–2	Sleaford Town (9)	109
7	Newton Aycliffe (9)	2–0	Marske United (9)	227

Tie	Home team (tier)	Score	Away team (tier)	Att.
8	Bowers & Pitsea (9)	3–0	Sutton Common Rovers (9)	121
9	Kidlington (9)	3–2	Knaphill (9)	216
10	Newport IW (9)	1–2 (a.e.t.)	Ashford United (9)	257
11	Moneyfields (9)	0–2	Bristol Manor Farm (9)	135
12	FC Romania (9)	1–2	Camberley Town (9)	142
13	AFC Dunstable (9)	0–3	Salisbury (9)	512
14	Berkhamsted (9)	4–2	Hullbridge Sports (9)	246
15	Hartley Wintney (9)	3–1	Bradford Town (9)	241
16	Bodmin Town (10)	1–3	Ipswich Wanderers (9)	282

== Fifth round proper ==
Tie	Home team (tier)	Score	Away team (tier)	Att.
1	Ipswich Wanderers (9)	1–1	Bowers & Pitsea (9)	284
replay	Bowers & Pitsea (9)	2–1 (a.e.t.)	Ipswich Wanderers (9)	321
2	Sunderland RCA (9)	2–3	Bristol Manor Farm (9)	329
3	Camberley Town (9)	5–0	Newton Aycliffe (9)	460
4	Berkhamsted (9)	1–2	Morpeth Town (9)	327

Tie	Home team (tier)	Score	Away team (tier)	Att.
5	Cleethorpes Town (9)	1–2	Kidlington (9)	274
6	Nuneaton Griff (10)	0–3	Salisbury (9)	870
7	Ashford United (9)	1–1	Dunston UTS (9)	636
replay	Dunston UTS (9)	2–3	Ashford United (9)	320
8	Hartley Wintney (9)	1–4	Hereford (9)	1,120

== Quarter-finals ==
Tie	Home team (tier)	Score	Away team (tier)	Att.
1	Hereford (9)	3–2 (a.e.t.)	Camberley Town (9)	3,329
2	Salisbury (9)	3–0	Ashford United (9)	1,791

Tie	Home team (tier)	Score	Away team (tier)	Att.
3	Morpeth Town (9)	2–0	Bristol Manor Farm (9)	718
4	Bowers & Pitsea (9)	3–3	Kidlington (9)	370
replay	Kidlington (9)	0–4	Bowers & Pitsea (9)	545

== Semi-finals ==
Leg no	Home team (tier)	Score	Away team (tier)	Att.
1st	Hereford (9)	1–0	Salisbury (9)	4,683
2nd	Salisbury (9)	1–2	Hereford (9)	3,450

Hereford won 3–1 on aggregate.

Leg no	Home team (tier)	Score	Away team (tier)	Att.
1st	Bowers & Pitsea (9)	2–2	Morpeth Town (9)	426
2nd	Morpeth Town (9)	2–1	Bowers & Pitsea (9)	1,256

Morpeth Town won 4–3 on aggregate.

== Final ==
22 May 2016
12:15 BST

Hereford	1–4	Morpeth Town
Purdie 2'	Report	Swailes 34'; Carr 47'; Taylor 59'; Bell 90'

Wembley Stadium, London
Attendance: 46,781
Referee: Stuart Attwell (Birmingham FA)
