= 2014–15 Western Football League =

Western Football League
- Season: 2014–15

The 2014–15 Western Football League season (known as the 2014–15 Toolstation Western Football League for sponsorship reasons) is the 113th in the history of the Western Football League, a football competition in England. Teams are divided into two divisions; the Premier and the First.

The league champions for the first time in their history were Melksham Town. Slimbridge finished in a promotion position and were promoted to the Southern League. The champions of Division One were Barnstaple Town.

== Premier Division ==
The Premier Division features two new clubs in a league of 19, reduced from 21 after the promotion of Larkhall Athletic to the Southern League, and the relegation of Hengrove Athletic and Radstock Town to the First Division. Ilfracombe Town also left, resigning from the league shortly before the start of the season:

- Bradford Town, champions of Division One.
- Shepton Mallet, runners-up in Division One.

Exmouth Town finished runners-up in the South West Peninsula League but were refused promotion due to ground grading issues.

The following clubs applied for promotion to Step 4: Brislington, Bristol Manor Farm, Melksham Town and Slimbridge. Melksham Town's new stadium was not ready and their existing stadium failed the ground grading.

=== League table ===
Pos	Team	Pld	W	D	L	GF	GA	GD	Pts	Promotion or relegation
1	Melksham Town (C)	36	23	7	6	89	41	+48	76	
2	Buckland Athletic	36	23	2	11	90	41	+49	71	
3	Slimbridge (P)	36	20	6	10	55	36	+19	66	Promotion to Southern League Division One S&W
4	Bristol Manor Farm	36	18	9	9	67	40	+27	63	
5	Odd Down	36	18	8	10	78	56	+22	62	
6	Willand Rovers	36	18	7	11	78	60	+18	61	
7	Bitton	36	17	7	12	67	52	+15	58	
8	Bradford Town	36	17	6	13	71	61	+10	57	
9	Shepton Mallet	36	16	7	13	70	70	0	55	
10	Brislington	36	14	10	12	64	45	+19	52	
11	Sherborne Town	36	13	11	12	62	53	+9	50	
12	Cadbury Heath	36	15	5	16	71	83	−12	50	
13	Street	36	12	8	16	64	64	0	44	
14	Bridport	36	13	5	18	44	66	−22	44	
15	Gillingham Town	36	13	4	19	66	68	−2	43	
16	Longwell Green Sports	36	12	5	19	49	67	−18	41	
17	Hallen	36	8	7	21	41	70	−29	31	
18	Winterbourne United	36	8	4	24	49	93	−44	28	
19	Bishop Sutton (R)	36	4	2	30	30	139	−109	14	Relegation to the First Division

Source: .
Rules for classification: 1) points; 2) goal difference; 3) number of goals scored.
(C) Champions; (P) Promoted; (R) Relegated

=== Locations ===
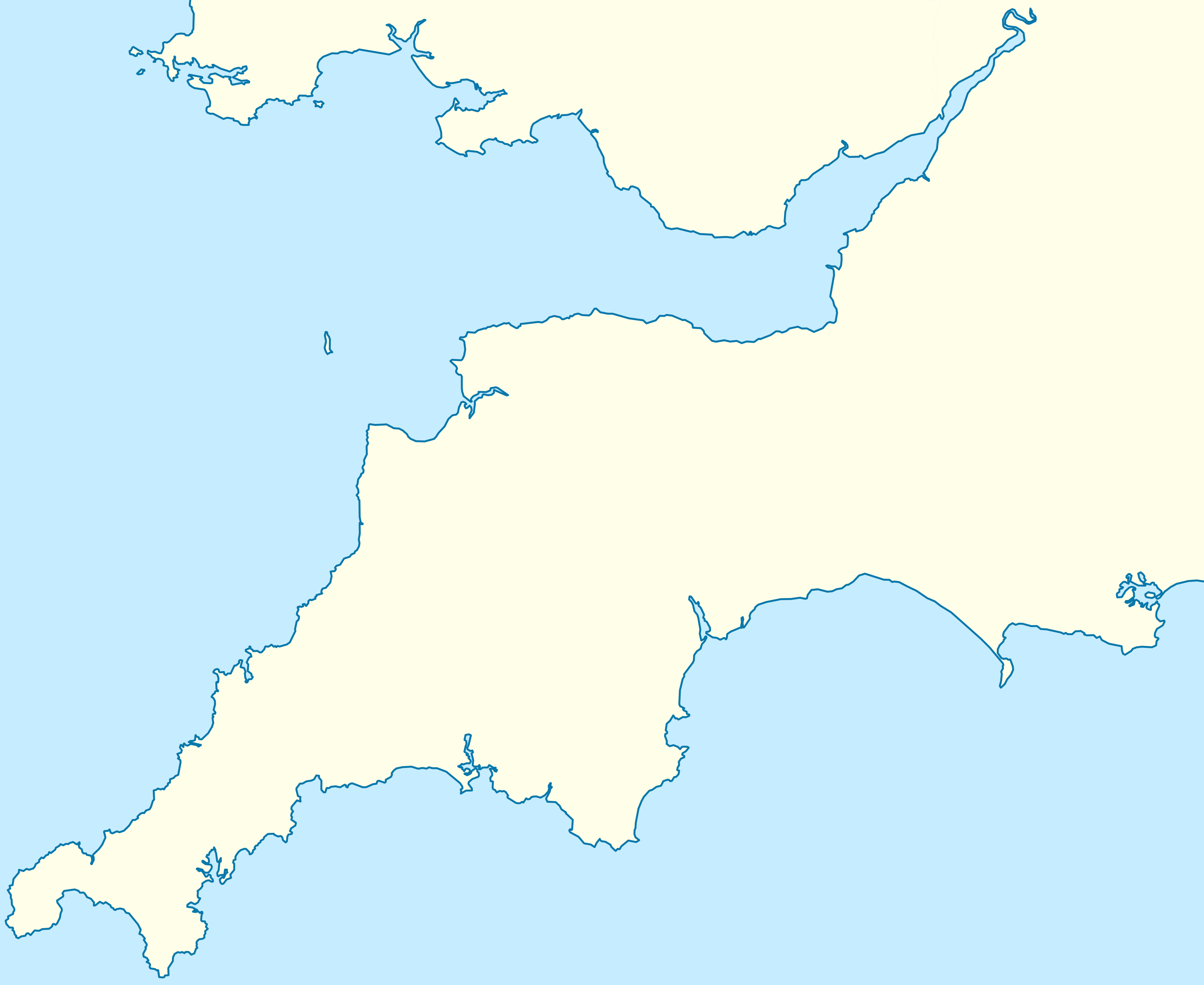
Locations of the 2014–15 Western League Premier Division teams

=== Results ===
Home \ Away	BIS	BIT	BRA	BRD	BRS	BMF	BUC	CAD	GIL	HAL	LGS	MEL	ODD	SHP	SHB	SLI	STR	WIL	WIN
Bishop Sutton		1–2	1–11	2–5	0–11	1–0	0–5	2–3	2–3	2–0	0–9	0–3	0–3	0–5	0–4	1–2	0–3	4–5	0–2
Bitton	0–2		3–4	1–2	1–0	2–1	1–4	5–1	1–1	4–1	3–0	4–3	2–4	1–2	2–2	2–1	1–4	2–2	3–0
Bradford Town	0–4	1–2		1–2	1–2	1–2	0–4	3–2	1–2	5–2	3–3	1–2	2–1	2–6	0–0	1–1	1–1	1–2	2–1
Bridport	5–1	0–3	0–3		0–0	0–0	1–0	1–1	1–3	0–0	2–4	0–3	2–0	3–2	3–2	0–1	2–5	2–4	3–1
Brislington	5–0	0–0	1–2	0–0		1–1	1–1	2–1	4–1	1–0	0–1	2–3	1–1	2–2	0–2	2–0	1–0	4–0	0–1
Bristol Manor Farm	3–1	1–0	1–0	2–0	1–1		0–2	1–1	3–1	5–0	3–0	1–4	1–2	3–1	2–2	5–1	2–0	3–1	1–1
Buckland Athletic	3–0	0–2	5–0	3–0	2–3	0–4		3–0	5–1	2–0	3–1	0–0	5–0	5–0	1–2	0–1	2–0	2–0	4–2
Cadbury Heath	2–0	0–2	2–3	4–1	1–0	1–1	3–4		0–3	1–3	2–1	1–4	4–4	2–2	4–3	2–1	3–2	1–2	0–4
Gillingham Town	13–0	1–3	1–2	3–0	2–4	1–3	4–1	2–4		0–4	0–0	0–3	2–3	2–3	3–1	2–0	3–1	1–1	2–2
Hallen	5–0	1–2	2–5	1–0	2–2	0–1	0–4	1–3	0–1		0–1	0–4	1–3	2–4	0–3	1–1	0–4	2–1	4–1
Longwell Green Sports	2–1	1–1	1–0	1–0	1–2	0–3	3–1	2–3	2–1	0–2		1–3	0–3	1–3	1–1	0–1	0–3	2–5	1–2
Melksham Town	1–1	3–0	0–3	3–0	2–2	3–0	1–3	4–1	3–1	1–1	3–0		4–3	5–1	1–0	0–3	6–4	0–0	6–1
Odd Down	6–0	2–2	0–1	3–1	1–3	3–1	1–2	2–4	2–1	1–1	1–1	2–2		5–3	0–0	0–3	4–0	3–1	3–0
Shepton Mallet	3–1	1–0	1–2	2–0	2–1	2–1	1–5	3–4	2–1	0–0	1–2	2–0	0–3		2–2	0–0	1–0	2–4	2–1
Sherborne Town	5–0	1–0	1–3	1–2	2–3	0–2	2–1	1–2	0–1	1–1	3–1	0–2	2–2	2–1		3–0	3–2	1–3	2–1
Slimbridge	3–0	3–0	1–1	0–1	1–0	3–1	0–3	2–1	3–0	2–0	2–1	0–0	1–0	4–4	1–2		2–0	2–1	2–0
Street	1–1	1–1	1–3	2–3	3–0	2–2	3–2	3–1	0–1	3–0	4–1	2–1	0–2	1–1	1–1	1–0		0–0	2–2
Willand Rovers	4–1	1–2	1–1	4–0	4–1	1–1	4–3	5–1	2–1	1–0	1–2	1–2	0–1	2–1	2–2	0–5	6–2		4–0
Winterbourne United	2–1	1–7	0–1	0–2	3–2	1–5	0–1	1–5	2–1	1–4	1–2	0–4	3–4	1–2	3–3	1–2	5–3	2–3	

Legend: Blue = home team win; Yellow = draw; Red = away team win.

== First Division ==
The First Division features two new clubs in a league of 22, after the promotion of Bradford Town and Shepton Mallet to the Premier Division:

- Hengrove Athletic, relegated from the Premier Division.
- Radstock Town, relegated from the Premier Division.

=== League table ===
Pos	Team	Pld	W	D	L	GF	GA	GD	Pts	Promotion
1	Barnstaple Town (C, P)	42	30	10	2	128	27	+101	100 (Note: Barnstaple Town were awarded a home win after Devizes Town failed to arrive for the match on 2 May.)	Promotion to the Premier Division
2	Welton Rovers (P)	42	28	9	5	85	41	+44	93	Promotion to the Premier Division
3	Cribbs (P)	42	26	12	4	88	43	+45	90	Promotion to the Premier Division
4	Wincanton Town	42	24	4	14	101	77	+24	76	
5	Chard Town	42	21	7	14	74	68	+6	70	
6	Almondsbury UWE	42	21	6	15	77	67	+10	69	
7	Wellington	42	20	8	14	70	62	+8	68	
8	Ashton & Backwell United	42	19	10	13	81	62	+19	67	
9	Corsham Town	42	19	7	16	79	67	+12	64	
10	Cheddar	42	19	9	14	92	85	+7	63 (Note: Cheddar had three points deducted for fielding an ineligible player against Roman Glass St George on 22 November.)	
11	Chippenham Park	42	15	10	17	68	62	+6	55	
12	Hengrove Athletic	42	15	10	17	75	75	0	55	
13	Radstock Town	42	15	10	17	73	73	0	55	
14	Oldland Abbotonians	42	15	10	17	58	70	−12	55	
15	Calne Town	42	13	12	17	63	85	−22	51	
16	Warminster Town	42	12	9	21	63	74	−11	45	
17	Keynsham Town	42	11	9	22	62	109	−47	42	
18	Devizes Town	42	11	6	25	59	83	−24	39	
19	Wells City	42	9	10	23	62	84	−22	37	
20	Roman Glass St George	42	7	15	20	39	74	−35	36	
21	Portishead Town	42	8	5	29	39	88	−49	29	
22	Westbury United	42	6	8	28	52	112	−60	26	

Updated to match(es) played on 16:09, 2 May 2015 (UTC). Source: .
Rules for classification: 1) points; 2) goal difference; 3) number of goals scored.
(C) Champions; (P) Promoted

=== Locations ===
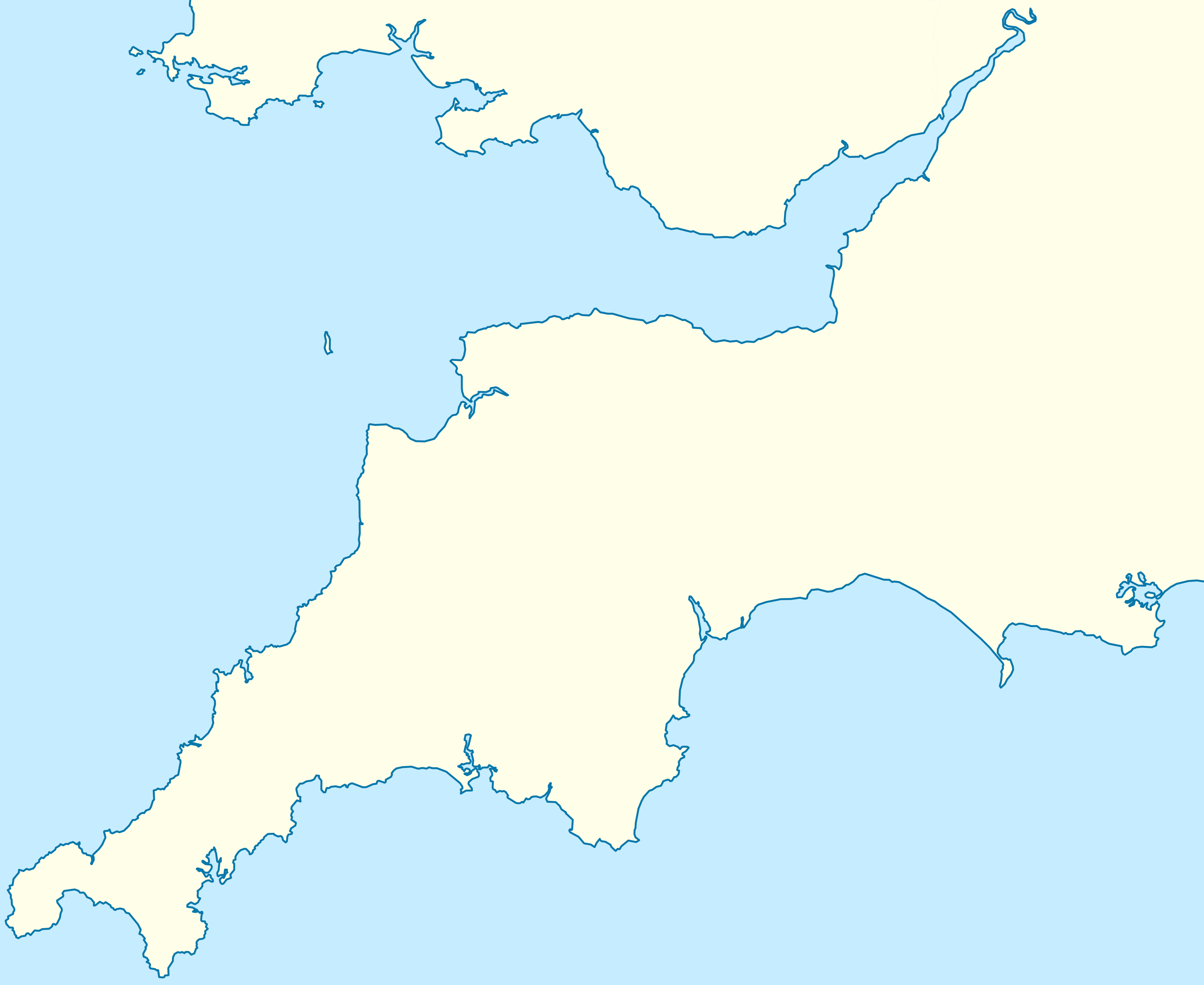
Locations of the 2014–15 Western League First Division teams

=== Results ===
Home \ Away	ALM	ASH	BAR	CAL	CHA	CHE	CHI	COR	CRI	DEV	HEN	KEY	OLD	POR	RAD	ROM	WAR	WLL	WLS	WLT	WES	WIN
Almondsbury UWE		4–0	0–1	4–4	1–1	4–2	1–2	2–1	1–1	2–5	0–1	2–1	4–0	1–0	2–6	1–0	2–1	1–1	3–1	1–1	3–1	0–5
Ashton & Backwell United	2–1		0–5	3–0	2–2	4–5	1–0	1–0	0–0	1–2	3–2	0–0	4–0	3–0	1–0	0–0	4–0	2–0	0–0	0–2	4–0	0–3
Barnstaple Town	5–3	3–3		7–0	4–3	5–0	2–1	3–0	1–1		2–1	5–0	1–1	4–0	7–0	8–0	3–1	7–1	4–1	0–0	8–0	1–3
Calne Town	1–2	0–1	0–4		2–2	3–3	1–4	2–1	0–0	5–1	0–1	0–1	4–0	2–1	3–3	2–5	2–2	2–1	2–1	0–2	0–0	2–0
Chard Town	1–0	3–3	0–0	3–1		0–1	1–2	1–2	1–3	2–0	2–1	4–1	3–0	2–0	1–7	1–2	0–4	4–3	3–2	0–1	3–1	3–0
Cheddar	2–3	2–1	0–0	1–2	0–3		2–1	4–3	1–2	2–0	2–3	3–1	2–1	2–0	3–2	3–0	3–1	3–4	2–2	1–3	1–0	3–3
Chippenham Park	0–1	2–0	0–3	0–0	1–2	3–3		2–2	3–4	1–0	0–1	2–4	1–2	6–2	2–0	1–1	0–0	0–1	3–2	1–1	4–1	1–3
Corsham Town	4–2	4–3	1–1	4–1	1–2	0–0	0–0		4–2	4–3	0–4	5–2	5–2	4–1	0–1	1–0	5–0	0–1	1–0	1–1	4–2	0–3
Cribbs	1–0	2–1	0–0	3–1	6–0	2–0	1–1	4–2		5–2	2–1	2–0	1–1	2–1	1–1	1–1	1–0	1–2	2–1	2–0	7–1	3–2
Devizes Town	0–1	1–2	0–1	0–1	0–1	3–4	0–0	1–0	3–1		3–0	3–2	0–3	3–1	1–1	0–0	0–2	0–5	1–2	0–2	1–1	0–0
Hengrove Athletic	1–2	2–2	0–4	1–1	2–1	2–4	0–4	1–2	1–1	4–1		2–2	2–1	1–1	4–1	4–1	1–2	2–2	7–2	0–3	2–2	3–2
Keynsham Town	1–4	2–9	1–3	2–2	1–3	3–3	1–2	1–1	1–6	4–2	1–0		2–4	0–3	2–1	1–0	1–0	1–1	3–3	2–5	2–0	3–3
Oldland Abbotonians	3–1	0–3	1–0	4–2	1–2	2–2	1–0	0–3	1–3	1–1	2–2	4–1		2–1	0–1	1–1	0–0	2–1	3–2	2–1	4–1	2–0
Portishead Town	2–0	1–2	1–6	1–2	0–0	2–1	0–1	2–1	3–0	2–1	1–2	1–2	1–1		0–3	0–0	1–2	0–2	1–4	0–0	3–0	2–4
Radstock Town	1–2	2–0	0–5	1–1	2–0	3–3	5–6	1–2	0–0	2–1	5–4	1–2	1–4	2–0		0–0	0–1	0–0	2–2	1–2	3–0	4–2
Roman Glass St George	0–2	1–1	0–4	1–1	2–3	1–6	1–1	0–4	0–2	0–3	3–1	1–3	2–2	1–0	3–1		0–0	1–2	4–0	1–3	1–1	0–2
Warminster Town	0–0	1–2	0–1	1–3	0–2	3–4	2–0	6–1	1–2	2–3	1–1	5–0	2–0	4–1	0–2	1–1		2–2	4–3	0–1	4–2	2–4
Wellington	2–4	3–2	1–1	2–1	0–1	2–1	3–2	0–1	1–2	3–1	0–1	1–0	1–0	4–0	1–1	2–0	3–1		2–0	2–3	1–0	2–1
Wells City	0–4	1–1	0–2	0–1	0–1	0–2	0–1	2–2	1–3	2–4	2–2	3–1	1–0	3–0	3–0	1–1	3–0	3–0		0–2	3–0	2–2
Welton Rovers	3–2	1–0	0–0	7–0	4–3	1–0	4–3	2–1	1–1	2–5	2–0	2–2	1–1	1–2	0–1	1–0	3–0	3–2	4–1		3–0	2–1
Westbury United	0–2	1–4	0–2	0–2	3–3	6–2	1–3	0–2	0–3	4–1	2–4	5–1	2–0	2–1	0–4	0–1	2–2	2–2	2–2	2–3		3–2
Wincanton Town	3–2	3–5	2–5	5–4	2–1	1–3	2–1	1–0	1–2	5–3	2–1	3–1	2–0	5–0	2–1	3–2	4–2	3–1	2–1	0–2	5–2	

Updated to match(es) played on 2 May 2015. Source:
Legend: Blue = home team win; Yellow = draw; Red = away team win.
