= 2014–15 FA Vase =

Football Association Vase

Tournament details
- Country: England; Wales
- Teams: 536

Final positions
- Champions: North Shields (1st title)
- Runners-up: Glossop North End

The 2014–15 FA Vase is the 41st season of the FA Vase, an annual football competition for teams playing below Step 4 of the English National League System. The competition is to be played with two qualifying rounds preceding the six proper rounds, semi-finals (played over two legs) and final to be played at Wembley Stadium.

The 2015 winners were North Shields F.C., who beat Glossop North End A.F.C. 2–1 on 9 May at Wembley Stadium.

For the 2014–15 season 536 entrants were accepted, one more than the 2013–14 season.

== Calendar ==
The calendar for the 2014–15 FA Vase qualifying rounds, as announced by The Football Association.

Round	Date	Matches	Clubs	New entries this round	Prize money
First round qualifying	6 September 2014	145	536 → 391	290	£600
Second round qualifying	4 October 2014	161	391 → 230	177	£800
First round proper	1 November 2014	102	230 → 128	43	£900
Second round proper	22 November 2014	64	128 → 64	26	£1,200
Third round proper	6 December 2014	32	64 → 32	none	£1,500
Fourth round proper	17 January 2015	16	32 → 16	none	£2,000
Fifth round proper	7 February 2015	8	16 → 8	none	£2,500
Quarter-finals	28 February 2015	4	8 → 4	none	£4,500
Semi-finals	21 March and 28 March 2015	2	4 → 2	none	£6,000
Final	9 May 2015	1	2 → 1	none	Runner-up £17,000 Winner £25,000

== First round qualifying ==
First round qualifying fixtures were played on 6 September 2014, with replays taking place no later than 11 September 2014. Two-hundred and ninety teams entered at this stage of the competition. The draw was as follows:

Tie no	Home team (tier)	Score	Away team (tier)	Attendance
1	Colne (9)	2–1	Penrith (9)	198
2	Darlington Railway Athletic (10)	0–5	Sunderland RCA (9)	70
3	South Shields (10)	1–0	Willington (10)	51
4	Albion Sports (9)	5–2	Bridlington Town (9)	
5	West Allotment Celtic (9)	1–0	Eccleshill United (10)	79
6	Silsden (9)	4–0	Brandon United (10)	91
7	Holker Old Boys (10)	3–0	Norton & Stockton Ancients (10)	54
8	Hebburn Town (10)	0–2	Marske United (9)	132
9	Daisy Hill (10)	3–2	Newton Aycliffe (9)	71
10	Birtley Town (10)	2–1	Thornaby (10)	
11	Jarrow Roofing BCA (9)	2–3†	Ryhope CW (10)	61
12	Chester-Le-Street Town (10)	3–1	Knaresborough Town (10)	
13	Northallerton Town (10)	0–1	North Shields (9)	157
14	Consett (9)	2–1	Thackley (9)	270
15	Ryton & Crawcrook Albion (10)	1–1	Billingham Town (10)	72
replay	Billingham Town (10)	1–0	Ryton & Crawcrook Albion (10)	97
16	Barnoldswick Town (9)	5–1†	Tow Law Town (10)	110
17	Alsager Town (9)	1–3	Maltby Main (9)	60
18	Oldham Boro (10)	0–2	1874 Northwich (9)	216
19	Staveley Miners Welfare (9)	1–2	Athersley Recreation (9)	
20	Appleby Frodingham (10)	2–4†	Ashton Town (10)	64
21	Dronfield Town (10)	w/o	Cammell Laird 1907 (10)	
22	Rossington Main (10)	2–0	AFC Blackpool (9)	68
23	Runcorn Town (9)	11–0	Glasshoughton Welfare (9)	74
24	Winsford United (9)	5–0	Cheadle Town (10)	68
25	Irlam (10)	1–2†	St Helens Town (9)	85
26	Hemsworth MW (10)	3–2	Parkgate (9)	50
27	Stockport Sports (9)	5–5	Selby Town (10)	57
replay	Selby Town (10)	3–1	Stockport Sports (9)	109
28	Squires Gate (9)	2–4	AFC Liverpool (9)	88
29	Vauxhall Motors (11)	1–3	Rochdale Town (10)	79
30	Worsborough Bridge Athletic (10)	3–2	Pontefract Collieries (10)	178
31	Atherton Collieries (10)	4–0	Penistone Church(10)	119
32	Shawbury United (10)	7–1	Coventry Copsewood (10)	24
33	Dudley Sports (10)	0–3	Eccleshall (10)	42
34	Kirby Muxloe (9)	1–0	Stafford Town (10)	32
35	Studley (10)	3–1	Bilston Town (10)	
36	Continental Star (9)	3–2	Heath Hayes (9)	44
37	Sporting Khalsa (10)	4–0	Wolverhampton Casuals (10)	57
38	Southam United (10)	1–0†	Wednesfield (10)	75
39	Ellesmere Rangers (10)	2–2	Stone Old Alleynians (11)	58
replay	Stone Old Alleynians (11)	2–1	Ellesmere Rangers (10)	
40	Bewdley Town (10)	3–4	Coventry Sphinx (9)	69
41	Lichfield City (10)	4–2†	Alvechurch (9)	111
42	Cadbury Athletic (10)	3–4†	Bardon Hill Sports (10)	42
43	Wolverhampton SC (10)	0–5	Gornal Athletic (10)	30
44	Shifnal Town (10)	2–1	Racing Club Warwick (10)	47
45	Wellington Amateurs (10)	0–3	Pegasus Juniors (10)	60
46	Malvern Town (10)	2–3	Walsall Wood (9)	137
47	AFC Wulfrunians (9)	3–1	Black Country Rangers (10)	
48	Tipton Town (9)	2–1	Hinckley (10)	146
49	Stourport Swifts (9)	2–2	Bromsgrove Sporting (10)	155
replay	Bromsgrove Sporting (10)	3–2†	Stourport Swifts (9)	301
50	Thurnby Nirvana (9)	2–1	Greenwood Meadows (10)	34
51	Harborough Town (9)	0–1	Holbrook Sports (10)	
52	Stapenhill (10)	0–3	South Normanton Athletic (10)	45
53	Holwell Sports (10)	4–2	Anstey Nomads (10)	
54	Retford United (9)	1–3	Shirebrook Town (10)	164
55	Grimsby Borough (10)	0–6	Clipstone (10)	
56	Long Eaton United (9)	3–0	Arnold Town (10)	119
57	Louth Town (10)	2–1†	Aylestone Park (10)	81
58	Radford (10)	1–2	Blaby & Whetstone Athletic (10)	
59	Cleethorpes Town (9)	5–2	Loughborough University (9)	74
60	AFC Mansfield (10)	3–2	Teversal (10)	
61	Thetford Town (9)	2–1	Ely City (9)	61
62	Yaxley (9)	2–0	Swaffham Town (10)	80
63	Eynesbury Rovers (10)	1–1	Mildenhall Town (9)	
replay	Mildenhall Town (9)	2–0	Eynesbury Rovers (10)	129
64	Kirkley & Pakefield (9)	2–1	Diss Town (9)	74
65	Godmanchester Rovers (9)	8–0	St Neots Town Saints (10)	
66	Bowers & Pitsea (9)	4–2	Codicote (10)	
67	Barking (9)	1–2	Stanway Rovers (9)	93
68	Halstead Town (10)	1–2†	FC Broxbourne Borough (10)	
69	Wivenhoe Town (9)	2–1	Takeley (9)	87
70	Hoddesdon Town (9)	2–1	Sawbridgeworth Town (9)	101
71	Cornard United (10)	1–2	Romania (9)	
72	Basildon United (9)	0–1	Haverhill Borough (10)	
73	Baldock Town (10)	4–1	Sporting Bengal United (9)	46
74	Hatfield Town (10)	1–2	Hertford Town (9)	73
75	AFC Kempston Rovers (9)	4–0	Northampton Sileby Rangers (9)	46

Tie no	Home team (tier)	Score	Away team (tier)	Attendance
76	CB Hounslow United (10)	1–3	AFC Dunstable (9)	35
77	Irchester United (10)	2–2	Staines Lammas (10)	
replay	Staines Lammas (10)	3–1	Irchester United (10)	
78	Oxhey Jets (9)	4–1	Bedfont & Feltham (10)	37
79	Cogenhoe United (9)	1–2	Bedford (10)	
80	Burton Park Wanderers (10)	2–2	Buckingham Athletic (10)	
replay	Buckingham Athletic (10)	3–3	Burton Park Wanderers (10)	80
Burton Park Wanderers advance 4–2 on penalties.
81	Crawley Green (10)	3–1†	Thrapston Town (10)	55
82	Wootton Blue Cross (11)	1–7	Biggleswade United (9)	26
83	Broadfields United (11)	0–6	Harefield United (9)	46
84	Northampton Spencer (10)	3–1	Wellingborough Whitworth (10)	
85	Langford (10)	2–2	Spelthorne Sports (10)	51
replay	Spelthorne Sports (10)	4–1	Langford (10)	
86	Berkhamsted (9)	2–1	London Tigers (9)	
87	Potton United (10)	0–0	Winslow United (10)	
replay	Winslow United (10)	1–2	Potton United (10)	
88	Raunds Town (10)	0–2†	Woodford United (10)	40
89	Newport Pagnell Town (9)	3–1	Bugbrooke St Michaels (10)	
90	New College Swindon (10)	3–3	Fleet Spurs (10)	
replay	Fleet Spurs (10)	2–4†	New College Swindon (10)	
91	Cove (9)	2–3	Wootton Bassett Town (9)	
92	Flackwell Heath (9)	3–2	Ash United (10)	43
93	Fairford Town (10)	1–2	Reading Town (9)	40
94	Alton Town (10)	1–2	Tadley Calleva (10)	100
95	Cheltenham Saracens (9)	1–2	Milton United (9)	23
96	Slimbridge (9)	1–0	Kidlington (9)	43
97	Woodley Town (10)	3–0	Badshot Lea (9)	
98	Windsor (9)	3–0	Shrivenham (9)	167
99	Hartley Wintney (9)	3–2	Holyport (9)	61
100	Canterbury City (9)	2–4	Banstead Athletic (10)	65
101	Southwick (11)	3–2	Dorking (10)	50
102	Fisher (9)	4–3†	Woodstock Sports (9)	104
103	St Francis Rangers (9)	5–1†	Oakwood (10)	
104	Wick & Barnham United (10)	4–0	Haywards Heath Town (10)	
105	Holmesdale (9)	3–1	Colliers Wood United (9)	
106	Glebe (10)	0–2	Bexhill United (10)	
107	Croydon (9)	3–3	Phoenix Sports (9)	
replay	Phoenix Sports (9)	1–0	Croydon (9)	
108	Ringmer (9)	4–1	Saltdean United (10)	41
109	Horley Town (9)	3–2	Sevenoaks Town (9)	67
110	Raynes Park Vale (9)	2–1	Crowborough Athletic (9)	51
111	Lancing (9)	4–1	Mole Valley Sutton Common (9)	
112	Dorking Wanderers (9)	3–0	Chichester City (9)	25
113	Newhaven (10)	2–6	Greenwich Borough (9)	89
114	Seven Acre & Sidcup (10)	0–1	Pagham (9)	
115	Epsom Athletic (10)	3–2	Deal Town (9)	
116	Selsey (9)	0–3	Corinthian (9)	90
117	Pewsey Vale (10)	0–4	Melksham Town (9)	71
118	Amesbury Town (10)	3–1	Hythe & Dibden (10)	
119	Swanage Town & Herston (11)	2–0	Downton (10)	111
120	Cribbs (10)	0–1	Cowes Sports (10)	
121	Hamworthy United (9)	6–3	Winterbourne United (9)	
122	Almondsbury UWE (10)	2–3	Whitchurch United (9)	50
123	Warminster Town (10)	1–2†	Longwell Green Sports (9)	104
124	Wincanton Town (10)	0–5	Bemerton Heath Harlequins (9)	124
125	Andover Town (9)	1–0	Westbury United (10)	
126	Lymington Town (9)	0–8	Romsey Town (10)	64
127	Fareham Town (9)	2–0	Fawley (9)	115
128	Moneyfields (9)	4–0	Brockenhurst (9)	
129	Roman Glass St George (10)	2–1	Devizes Town (10)	48
130	AFC Portchester (9)	2–1	Bitton (9)	
131	Oldland Abbotonians (10)	1–7	Bradford Town (9)	48
132	Bridport (9)	5–0	Totton & Eling (9)	112
133	Team Solent (10)	3–3	Cadbury Heath (9)	45
replay	Cadbury Heath (9)	2–1†	Team Solent (10)	
134	Elmore (10)	0–5	Torpoint Athletic (10)	60
135	Camelford (10)	0–0	St Blazey (10)	59
replay	St Blazey (10)	1–1	Camelford (10)	78
St Blazey advance 5–4 on penalties.
136	Plymouth Parkway (10)	4–2	Willand Rovers (9)	162
137	Wells City (10)	0–2	Brislington (9)	62
138	Welton Rovers (10)	3–2	Cheddar (10)	77
139	Barnstaple Town (10)	5–0	Elburton Villa (10)	130
140	Ashton & Backwell United (10)	2–4	Bishop Sutton (9)	34
141	AFC St Austell (10)	8–1	Porthleven (10)	
142	Crediton United (11)	0–3	Saltash United (10)	
143	Tavistock (10)	1–2	Radstock Town (10)	62
144	Buckland Athletic (9)	1–0	Cullompton Rangers (10)	117
145	Newquay (10)	1–0	Bovey Tracey (10)	

Notes:

- † = After Extra Time

== Second round qualifying ==
Second round qualifying fixtures were played on 4 October 2014, with replays taking place no later than 9 October 2014. One-hundred and seventy-seven new teams joined the one-hundred and forty-five who won their First round qualifying match at this stage of the competition. The draw was as follows:

Tie no	Home team (tier)	Score	Away team (tier)	Attendance
1	Holker Old Boys (10)	1–0†	Durham City (9)	67
2	Whitley Bay (9)	4–3	South Shields (10)	319
3	Billingham Town (10)	1–3	Yorkshire Amateur (10)	
4	AFC Darwen (10)	4–3	Washington (10)	98
5	Colne (9)	4–0	Heaton Stannington (10)	178
6	Ryhope CW (10)	5–2	Barnoldswick Town (9)	50
7	Bishop Auckland (9)	4–0	Birtley Town (10)	
8	Alnwick Town (10)	5–3	Pickering Town (9)	60
9	Hall Road Rangers (10)	0–5	Consett (9)	64
10	Marske United (9)	2–1	Chester-Le-Street Town (10)	
11	West Allotment Celtic (9)	1–1	Nelson (9)	
replay	Nelson (9)	1–2	West Allotment Celtic (9)	
12	Silsden (9)	3–1	Garforth Town (9)	101
13	Sunderland RCA (9)	1–0	Crook Town (9)	
14	Esh Winning (10)	1–12	Seaham Red Star (10)	
15	Daisy Hill (10)	5–4	Albion Sports (9)	47
16	Bedlington Terriers (9)	4–0	Liversedge (9)	
17	Stokesley SC (10)	2–4	North Shields (9)	
18	Billingham Synthonia (9)	2–2	Celtic Nation (10)	
replay	Celtic Nation (10)	1–2	Billingham Synthonia (9)	86
19	Selby Town (10)	4–2	Bacup & Rossendale Borough (9)	104
20	Ashton Athletic (9)	0–1	Shaw Lane Aquaforce (9)	78
21	Armthorpe Welfare (9)	1–2	Bootle (9)	63
22	Dronfield Town (10)	3–3	Maltby Main (9)	
replay	Maltby Main (9)	3–1	Dronfield Town (10)	
tie abandoned after 88 mins due to serious injury.
replay	Maltby Main (9)	0–2	Dronfield Town (10)	
23	West Didsbury & Chorlton (9)	2–1	Rossington Main (10)	63
24	Bottesford Town (10)	2–1	Rochdale Town (10)	41
25	Winsford United (9)	3–0	Hemsworth MW (10)	98
26	Chadderton (10)	3–1	Abbey Hey (9)	62
27	Widnes (10)	0–2	AFC Emley (10)	106
28	St Helens Town (9)	2–0	Nostell Miners Welfare (9)	70
29	Atherton Collieries (10)	4–1†	AFC Liverpool (9)	149
30	Hallam (10)	1–3	Ashton Town (10)	52
31	Athersley Recreation (9)	1–4	Runcorn Town (9)	171
32	Winterton Rangers (10)	1–0†	Worsborough Bridge Athletic (10)	
33	1874 Northwich (9)	9–0	Wigan Robin Park (10)	232
34	Southam United (10)	2–0	Barnt Green Spartak (11)	
35	Brocton (9)	5–4	Kirby Muxloe (9)	
36	Walsall Wood (9)	3–0	Pershore Town (10)	
37	Nuneaton Griff (10)	3–1	Dudley Town (10)	
38	Shawbury United (10)	2–3†	A.F.C. Bridgnorth (10)	
39	Bardon Hill Sports (10)	3–3	AFC Wulfrunians (9)	
replay	AFC Wulfrunians (9)	1–0	Bardon Hill Sports (10)	61
40	Aston (11)	2–0	Lichfield City (10)	
41	Ellistown & Ibstock United (10)	4–0	Bromyard Town (11)	
42	Lye Town (9)	1–2	Pegasus Juniors (10)	
43	Stone Old Alleynians (11)	0–4	Gornal Athletic (10)	
44	Continental Star (9)	2–3	Willenhall Town (11)	
45	Sporting Khalsa (10)	3–3	Hanley Town (10)	48
replay	Hanley Town (10)	3–1	Sporting Khalsa (10)	105
46	Eccleshall (10)	3–0	Atherstone Town (10)	69
47	Bolehall Swifts (10)	4–1	Cradley Town (10)	
48	Coventry Sphinx (9)	2–3	Studley (10)	
49	Heather St Johns (10)	3–4†	Rocester (10)	
50	Wellington FC (10)	3–2	Shifnal Town (10)	
51	Bromsgrove Sporting (10)	2–1	Tipton Town (9)	
52	Heanor Town (9)	6–1	Holwell Sports (10)	
53	Blidworth Welfare (11)	4–2	Clipstone (10)	
54	Radcliffe Olympic (10)	1–6	Cleethorpes Town (9)	
55	Blaby & Whetstone Athletic (10)	1–2	Borrowash Victoria (10)	
56	South Normanton Athletic (10)	0–5	Dunkirk F.C. (9)	
57	Oadby Town (9)	2–0	Retford United (9)	
58	Shepshed Dynamo (9)	4–0	Barrow Town (10)	
59	Louth Town (10)	1–4	Gedling MW (10)	
60	Basford United (9)	0–1	Mickleover Royals (11)	
61	Long Eaton United (9)	3–0	Lincoln Moorlands Railway (10)	
62	Holbrook Sports (10)	1–4	AFC Mansfield (10)	
63	Thurnby Nirvana (9)	8–4	Harrowby United (9)	
64	Sutton Town (10)	w/o	Graham St Prims (10)	
65	Belper United (11)	2–1†	Quorn (9)	116
66	Kirkley & Pakefield (9)	2–0	Newmarket Town (9)	
67	Peterborough Northern Star (9)	6–0	Team Bury (10)	
68	Fakenham Town (9)	2–1	Mildenhall Town (9)	
69	Walsham Le Willows (9)	1–7	Godmanchester Rovers (9)	
70	Great Yarmouth Town (10)	1–0	Boston Town (9)	
71	Peterborough Sports (10)	3–1	Thetford Town (9)	
72	Holbeach United (9)	2–0	Blackstones (10)	
73	Yaxley (9)	2–1	Sleaford Town (9)	
74	Southend Manor (9)	0–1	Wivenhoe Town (9)	
75	Whitton United (9)	5–1	Romania (9)	
76	Stowmarket Town (10)	0–4	Eton Manor (9)	
77	Hertford Town (9)	5–0	Ilford (9)	
78	FC Broxbourne Borough (10)	1–2	Woodbridge Town (10)	
79	Cockfosters (9)	5–0	Hoddesdon Town (9)	
80	Welwyn Garden City (10)	3–0	Clapton (9)	
81	Baldock Town (10)	4–3	Long Melford (10)	

Tie no	Home team (tier)	Score	Away team (tier)	Attendance
82	Ipswich Wanderers (9)	4–4	Hadley (9)	
replay	Hadley (9)	1–2	Ipswich Wanderers (9)	16
83	Haverhill Borough (10)	4–1	London Bari (9)	
84	Stanway Rovers (9)	4–1	Clacton (9)	
85	Bowers & Pitsea (9)	4–0	Haverhill Rovers (9)	
86	Debenham LC (10)	1–3	Saffron Walden Town (10)	
87	Stansted (9)	1–2	London Colney (9)	
88	Spelthorne Sports (10)	2–1	Risborough Rangers (10)	
89	Holmer Green (9)	2–1	Desborough Town (9)	
90	Rothwell Corinthians (10)	0–1	Bedfont Sports (9)	
91	Bedford (10)	0–3	AFC Kempston Rovers (9)	
92	Kings Langley (9)	2–0	Burton Park Wanderers (10)	
93	Sun Sports (9)	3–0	Potton United (10)	
94	Biggleswade United (9)	2–2	Northampton Spencer (10)	
replay	Northampton Spencer (10)	1–0	Biggleswade United (9)	
95	Wembley (9)	4–2	Hillingdon Borough (9)	
96	Stotfold (9)	1–0	Southall (10)	
97	Harefield United (9)	3–2†	Wellingborough Town (9)	
98	Newport Pagnell Town (9)	0–3	Berkhamsted (9)	
99	Long Buckby (9)	0–2†	Oxhey Jets (9)	
100	Irchester United (10)	3–1	Crawley Green (10)	
101	Tring Athletic (9)	2–1	Woodford United (10)	
102	AFC Dunstable (9)	5–0	Leverstock Green (9)	
103	Newbury (9)	1–4	Reading Town (9)	
104	Farnham Town (9)	2–1	Milton United (9)	
105	Highworth Town (9)	2–1†	Hartley Wintney (9)	
106	Windsor (9)	4–0	Binfield (9)	
107	Flackwell Heath (9)	5–0	Frimley Green (9)	
108	Hook Norton (10)	1–0	Tadley Calleva (10)	
109	Chinnor (10)	6–2†	Henley Town (10)	
110	Woodley Town (10)	0–2	Knaphill (9)	
111	Eversley & California (10)	3–3†	Tuffley Rovers (10)	
112	Slimbridge (9)	6–0	Oxford City Nomads (9)	
113	Wootton Bassett Town (9)	2–3†	Abingdon United (9)	
114	New College Swindon (10)	0–4	Thame United (9)	
115	Malmesbury Victoria (11)	3–2	Bracknell Town (9)	
116	Brimscombe & Thrupp (9)	5–2	Carterton (10)	
117	Bexhill United (10)	2–6	Rochester United (9)	
118	Seaford Town (10)	0–4	Fisher (9)	
119	Pagham (9)	5–2	Worthing United (10)	
120	Cobham (10)	0–4	Lingfield (9)	
121	Banstead Athletic (10)	2–1†	Mile Oak (10)	
122	Raynes Park Vale (9)	2–1	Epsom Athletic (10)	
123	Cray Valley Paper Mills (9)	0–2	Horley Town (9)	
124	Hassocks (9)	2–1	Broadbridge Heath (10)	
125	Molesey (9)	1–2	Greenwich Borough (9)	
126	Phoenix Sports (9)	1–0	Lancing (9)	
127	Wick & Barnham United (10)	3–3	Arundel (9)	
replay	Arundel (9)	2–1	Wick & Barnham United (10)	
128	Colliers Wood United (9)	2–0	Shoreham (9)	
129	Southwick (11)	0–3	Lordswood (9)	
130	AFC Croydon Athletic (10)	0–3	Chessington & Hook United (10)	
131	Ringmer (9)	3–2†	St Francis Rangers (9)	
132	Loxwood (10)	5–2	Steyning Town (10)	
133	Hailsham Town (9)	3–2	Dorking Wanderers (9)	
134	Beckenham Town (9)	3–5	Corinthian (9)	
135	Cadbury Heath (9)	2–3	Ringwood Town (10)	
136	Bradford Town (9)	4–0	Andover Town (9)	
137	Fareham Town (9)	1–0	Petersfield Town (9)	
138	Sherborne Town (9)	1–0	New Milton Town (10)	
139	Cowes Sports (10)	4–0	Corsham Town (10)	
140	Longwell Green Sports (9)	3–1	Amesbury Town (10)	
141	Bemerton Heath Harlequins (9)	4–3	Moneyfields (9)	
142	Verwood Town (9)	6–4†	Roman Glass St George (10)	
143	Chippenham Park (10)	3–2†	Whitchurch United (9)	
144	Calne Town (10)	2–1	Christchurch (9)	
145	Winchester City (9)	8–0	Laverstock & Ford (10)	
146	Swanage Town & Herston (11)	1–1†	United Services Portsmouth (10)	
147	AFC Portchester (9)	2–1	Hamworthy United (9)	
148	Bridport (9)	11–0	East Cowes Victoria Athletic (10)	
149	Melksham Town (9)	8–1	Bournemouth (9)	
150	Horndean (9)	1–1	Romsey Town (10)	
replay	Romsey Town (10)	0–5	Horndean (9)	31
151	Welton Rovers (10)	2–0	Hengrove Athletic (10)	
152	Radstock Town (10)	3–0	Portishead Town (10)	
153	Buckland Athletic (9)	7–1	Wellington FC (10)	
154	St Blazey (10)	1–0	Barnstaple Town (10)	
155	Falmouth Town (10)	3–2	Ashton & Backwell United (10)	
156	Shepton Mallet (9)	7–2	Wadebridge Town (11)	
157	Keynsham Town (10)	2–3	Plymouth Parkway (10)	
158	Saltash United (10)	5–3	Street (9)	
159	Torpoint Athletic (10)	2–3	Newquay (10)	
160	Brislington (9)	2–2	Witheridge (10)	
replay	Witheridge (10)	1–1	Brislington (9)	72
Brislington advance 3–2 on penalties.
161	AFC St Austell (10)	w/o	Ilfracombe Town (10)	

Notes:

- † = After Extra Time

== First round proper ==
First round proper fixtures were played on 1 November 2014, with replays taking place no later than 6 November 2014. Forty-three new teams joined the one-hundred and sixty-one who won their Second round qualifying match at this stage of the competition. Alnwick Town received a bye The draw was as follows:

Tie no	Home team (tier)	Score	Away team (tier)	Attendance
1	Colne (9)	2–3†	Shildon (9)	322
2	Bootle (9)	2–5	Barton Town Old Boys (9)	88
3	Dronfield Town (10)	2–1	Chadderton (10)	62
tie awarded to Chadderton – Dronfield Town removed.
4	West Allotment Celtic (9)	2–4	Runcorn Town (9)	89
5	North Shields (9)	4–2	AFC Emley (10)	259
6	Daisy Hill (10)	0–8	Atherton Collieries (10)	220
7	1874 Northwich (9)	2–1	Ashton Town (10)	241
8	Marske United (9)	5–0	Winterton Rangers (10)	228
9	Bishop Auckland (9)	3–0	Holker Old Boys (10)	224
10	Bottesford Town (10)	1–1†	Ryhope CW (10)	41
replay	Ryhope CW (10)	2–1	Bottesford Town (10)	87
11	Selby Town (10)	2–4	Seaham Red Star (10)	148
12	Guisborough Town (9)	3–1	Billingham Synthonia (9)	161
13	Shaw Lane Aquaforce (9)	4–1	Runcorn Linnets (9)	257
14	St Helens Town (9)	3–1	Yorkshire Amateur (10)	40
15	Sunderland RCA (9)	1–0	Handsworth Parramore (9)	82
16	Bedlington Terriers (9)	1–4	Whitley Bay (9)	342
17	AFC Darwen (10)	2–0	Maine Road (9)	129
18	Winsford United (9)	2–3	Tadcaster Albion (9)	142
19	Consett (9)	2–1	Silsden (9)	243
20	West Didsbury & Chorlton (9)	1–2	Glossop North End (9)	182
21	Gedling MW (10)	0–2	AFC Mansfield (10)	72
22	Long Eaton United (9)	0–3	Worksop Town (9)	229
23	Walsall Wood (9)	3–2	A.F.C. Bridgnorth (10)	89
24	Borrowash Victoria (10)	2–1†	Belper United (11)	119
25	Pegasus Juniors (10)	4–0	Aston (11)	55
26	Boldmere St. Michaels (9)	2–4	Thurnby Nirvana (9)	82
27	Rocester (10)	3–6	Brocton (9)	84
28	Bromsgrove Sporting (10)	3–2	Nuneaton Griff (10)	319
29	Ellistown & Ibstock United (10)	2–1	Hanley Town (10)	65
30	Blidworth Welfare (11)	0–2	Willenhall Town (11)	65
31	Southam United (10)	1–5	Cleethorpes Town (9)	113
32	Shepshed Dynamo (9)	5–0	Oadby Town (9)	178
33	Mickleover Royals (11)	3–0	Eccleshall (10)	88
34	Dunkirk F.C. (9)	7–2	Graham St Prims (10)	39
35	Gornal Athletic (10)	3–2	Studley (10)	54
36	A.F.C. Wulfrunians (9)	0–0†	Heanor Town (9)	176
replay	Heanor Town (9)	3–0	A.F.C. Wulfrunians (9)	126
37	Wellington FC (10)	2–3	Bolehall Swifts (10)	58
38	Welwyn Garden City (10)	1–2†	Peterborough Sports (10)	150
39	Eton Manor (9)	0–1	St. Margaretsbury (9)	30
40	Deeping Rangers (9)	1–0	Wivenhoe Town (9)	74
41	Woodbridge Town (10)	0–3	Huntingdon Town (9)	83
42	Irchester United (10)	0–4	Fakenham Town (9)	9
43	Oxhey Jets (9)	4–1	Tower Hamlets (9)	47
44	Kirkley & Pakefield (9)	2–3	Colney Heath (9)	75
tie awarded to Kirkley & Pakefield – Colney Heath removed.
45	Saffron Walden Town (10)	2–1	Whitton United (9)	323
46	Hertford Town (9)	1–1†	Stanway Rovers (9)	131
Stanway Rovers advance 6–5 on penalties.
47	Holbeach United (9)	2–0	Gorleston (9)	103
48	Sun Sports (9)	3–1	Harefield United (9)	60
49	Haringey Borough (9)	1–1†	Northampton Spencer (10)	
replay	Northampton Spencer (10)	0–0†	Haringey Borough (9)	
Northampton Spencer advance 4–3 on penalties.
50	Berkhamsted (9)	0–3	Kings Langley (9)	134

Tie no	Home team (tier)	Score	Away team (tier)	Attendance
51	Peterborough Northern Star (9)	1–0	Stotfold (9)	71
52	AFC Kempston Rovers (9)	3–1	Felixstowe & Walton United (9)	60
53	Ipswich Wanderers (9)	1–0	Cockfosters (9)	101
54	AFC Dunstable (9)	5–2	Haverhill Borough (10)	64
55	Enfield 1893 (9)	0–4	Tring Athletic (9)	50
56	Godmanchester Rovers (9)	0–0†	Yaxley (9)	201
replay	Yaxley (9)	4–0	Godmanchester Rovers (9)	109
57	Waltham Forest (9)	1–2	Great Yarmouth Town (10)	47
58	Wembley (9)	3–2	Bowers & Pitsea (9)	32
59	London Colney (9)	2–1	Baldock Town (10)	
60	Colliers Wood United (9)	4–3†	Ringmer (9)	
61	Chessington & Hook United (10)	2–1	Camberley Town (9)	
62	Eastbourne Town (9)	1–2†	Erith & Belvedere (9)	134
63	Hassocks (9)	3–1	Corinthian (9)	65
64	Littlehampton Town (9)	4–2†	Guildford City (9)	101
65	Ashford Town (9)	2–3	Loxwood (10)	
66	Fisher (9)	2–2†	Crawley Down Gatwick (9)	104
replay	Crawley Down Gatwick (9)	2–2†	Fisher (9)	73
Crawley Down Gatwick advance 4–3 on penalties.
67	Lingfield (9)	5–1	Epsom & Ewell (9)	96
68	Horsham YMCA (9)	3–1	Bedfont Sports (9)	95
69	Raynes Park Vale (9)	1–3	Westfield (9)	42
70	Chertsey Town (9)	1–2	Horley Town (9)	
71	Arundel (9)	0–2	Phoenix Sports (9)	
72	Lordswood (9)	0–1	Knaphill (9)	63
73	Greenwich Borough (9)	7–1	Hailsham Town (9)	
74	Tunbridge Wells (9)	3–1	Rochester United (9)	334
75	Erith Town (9)	4–1	Banstead Athletic (10)	37
76	Pagham (9)	2–1	Spelthorne Sports (10)	98
77	Thatcham Town (9)	1–4	Flackwell Heath (9)	
78	Bradford Town (9)	5–3	Malmesbury Victoria (11)	136
79	Ardley United (9)	1–2	Chippenham Park (10)	33
80	Hook Norton (10)	0–2	Newport (9)	93
81	Ringwood Town (10)	1–3	United Services Portsmouth (10)	
82	Windsor (9)	1–4	Highworth Town (9)	
83	Holmer Green (9)	2–2†	Ascot United (9)	55
replay	Ascot United (9)	7–0	Holmer Green (9)	62
84	Verwood Town (9)	2–0	Fareham Town (9)	
85	Calne Town (10)	1–2†	Bridport (9)	76
86	Melksham Town (9)	2–1†	Highmoor Ibis (9)	115
87	Thame United (9)	2–1	Chinnor (10)	283
88	Bemerton Heath Harlequins (9)	2–0	Cowes Sports (10)	76
89	Winchester City (9)	0–3	Horndean (9)	112
90	Farnham Town (9)	3–3†	Abingdon United (9)	
replay	Abingdon United (9)	5–1	Farnham Town (9)	
91	AFC Portchester (9)	2–1	Reading Town (9)	147
92	Folland Sports (9)	2–1	Sherborne Town (9)	
93	AFC St Austell (10)	4–0	Saltash United (10)	
94	Plymouth Parkway (10)	4–1	Tuffley Rovers (10)	173
95	Buckland Athletic (9)	1–0†	Longwell Green Sports (9)	
96	St Blazey (10)	4–1	Gillingham Town (9)	68
97	Shepton Mallet (9)	2–1	Brislington (9)	78
98	Welton Rovers (10)	3–1	Brimscombe & Thrupp (9)	91
99	Newquay (10)	1–3	Slimbridge (9)	103
100	Odd Down (9)	4–3	Falmouth Town (10)	61
101	Bristol Manor Farm (9)	3–0	Radstock Town (9)	78

Notes:

- † = After Extra Time

== Second round proper ==
Second round proper fixtures were played on 22 November 2014, with replays taking place no later than 27 November 2014. Twenty-six new teams joined the one-hundred and two who won their First round match at this stage of the competition. The draw was as follows:

Tie no	Home team (tier)	Score	Away team (tier)	Attendance
1	Bishop Auckland (9)	1–4	1874 Northwich (9)	407
2	Glossop North End (9)	3–0	Ryhope CW (10)	305
3	Alnwick Town (10)	4–5	St Helens Town (9)	89
4	Dunston UTS (9)	2–1	Guisborough Town (9)	198
5	Newcastle Benfield (9)	2–1	Ashington (9)	105
6	Marske United (9)	4–1	Barton Town Old Boys (9)	251
7	West Auckland Town (9)	0–3	Shaw Lane Aquaforce (9)	186
8	AFC Darwen (10)	3–5	Chadderton (10)	99
9	Shildon (9)	2–0	Runcorn Town (9)	210
10	Sunderland RCA (9)	0–3	North Shields (9)	124
11	Atherton Collieries (10)	1–2	Seaham Red Star (10)	230
12	Congleton Town (9)	0–1	Whitley Bay (9)	234
13	Consett (9)	8–0	Whickham (10)	171
14	Tadcaster Albion (9)	2–1	Morpeth Town (9)	265
15	Worksop Town (9)	2–1	Ellistown & Ibstock United (10)	391
16	Bolehall Swifts (10)	4–2	Dunkirk F.C. (9)	78
17	Westfields (9)	2–1	St Andrews (10)	202
18	Wisbech Town (9)	2–1	Cleethorpes Town (9)	218
19	Thurnby Nirvana (9)	4–1	Gornal Athletic (10)	45
20	Shepshed Dynamo (9)	2–3†	AFC Mansfield (10)	141
21	Heanor Town (9)	4–3	Coleshill Town (9)	177
22	Borrowash Victoria (10)	0–5	Bromsgrove Sporting (10)	114
23	Mickleover Royals (11)	2–0	Willenhall Town (11)	58
24	Brocton (9)	3–1	Pegasus Juniors (10)	77
25	Causeway United (9)	1–5	Walsall Wood (9)	74
26	Sun Sports (9)	0–1	Stanway Rovers (9)	–
27	London Colney (9)	3–1	Northampton Spencer (10)	79
28	St. Margaretsbury (9)	3–0	Ipswich Wanderers (9)	55
29	Peterborough Sports (10)	3–4	Peterborough Northern Star (9)	209
30	Hullbridge Sports (9)	1–0	AFC Rushden & Diamonds (9)	152
31	Holbeach United (9)	3–2	Huntingdon Town (9)	102
32	Norwich United (9)	2–1	AFC Kempston Rovers (9)	85
33	Yaxley (9)	3–0	Fakenham Town (9)	111

Tie no	Home team (tier)	Score	Away team (tier)	Attendance
34	Deeping Rangers (9)	2–0	Oxhey Jets (9)	64
35	AFC Dunstable (9)	3–2	Kirkley & Pakefield (9)	70
36	Saffron Walden Town (10)	6–5†	Kings Langley (9)	397
37	Ampthill Town (9)	1–4	Tring Athletic (9)	65
38	Wembley (9)	3–4†	Brantham Athletic (9)	72
39	Great Yarmouth Town (10)	2–0	Hadleigh United (9)	86
40	Erith Town (9)	0–3	Phoenix Sports (9)	89
41	Lingfield (9)	5–1	Chessington & Hook United (10)	60
42	Horndean (9)	0–1	Ascot United (9)	60
43	Hassocks (9)	0–7	Ashford United (9)	79
44	Hanworth Villa (9)	1–0	Knaphill (9)	–
45	Eastbourne United (9)	1–3	Horley Town (9)	102
46	Horsham YMCA (9)	1–2	Erith & Belvedere (9)	86
47	Abingdon United (9)	4–4†	Littlehampton Town (9)	62
replay	Littlehampton Town (9)	7–3	Abingdon United (9)	114
48	East Preston (9)	0–8	Flackwell Heath (9)	59
49	Westfield (9)	1–5	Tunbridge Wells (9)	155
50	Pagham (9)	1–2	Colliers Wood United (9)	64
51	United Services Portsmouth (10)	1–3	AFC Portchester (9)	–
52	Crawley Down Gatwick (9)	1–3	Greenwich Borough (9)	94
53	Newport (9)	3–2	Loxwood (10)	185
54	Alresford Town (9)	3–1	Thame United (9)	49
55	Odd Down (9)	3–2	Hallen A.F.C. (9)	41
56	Verwood Town (9)	5–4	Plymouth Parkway (10)	100
57	Folland Sports (9)	2–3	AFC St Austell (10)	–
58	Buckland Athletic (9)	2–1	Bristol Manor Farm (9)	98
59	Chippenham Park (10)	1–2†	Bradford Town (9)	169
60	Blackfield & Langley (9)	3–0	Bemerton Heath Harlequins (9)	–
61	Melksham Town (9)	2–2†	Slimbridge (9)	154
replay	Slimbridge (9)	1–4	Melksham Town (9)	63
62	Bodmin Town (9)	5–2	St Blazey (10)	148
63	Highworth Town (9)	3–0	Bridport (9)	107
64	Shepton Mallet (9)	1–0	Welton Rovers (10)	153

Notes:

- † = After Extra Time

== Third round proper ==
Third round proper fixtures were played on 6 December 2014, with replays taking place no later than 11 December 2014. No new teams were added for the remainder of the competition. The draw was as follows:

Tie no	Home team (tier)	Score	Away team (tier)	Attendance
1	Whitley Bay (9)	1–2	Dunston UTS (9)	439
2	1874 Northwich (9)	0–3	Glossop North End (9)	421
3	Shaw Lane Aquaforce (9)	3–2	Shildon (9)	371
4	Chadderton (10)	2–1	Newcastle Benfield (9)	61
5	Seaham Red Star (10)	2–4	North Shields (9)	180
6	St Helens Town (9)	2–4	Tadcaster Albion (9)	106
7	Consett (9)	3–2†	Marske United (9)	–
8	Worksop Town (9)	2–1	Westfields (9)	377
9	Thurnby Nirvana (9)	2–1	Bromsgrove Sporting (10)	147
10	Bolehall Swifts (10)	0–5	Brocton (9)	136
11	Mickleover Royals (11)	0–1	AFC Mansfield (10)	134
12	Wisbech Town (9)	2–3	Walsall Wood (9)	232
13	Deeping Rangers (9)	1–2†	Heanor Town (9)	129
14	Saffron Walden Town (10)	1–0	AFC Dunstable (9)	446
15	Hullbridge Sports (9)	1–0	Great Yarmouth Town (10)	91
16	St. Margaretsbury (9)	0–2	Stanway Rovers (9)	88

Tie no	Home team (tier)	Score	Away team (tier)	Attendance
17	Peterborough Northern Star (9)	2–3	Flackwell Heath (9)	96
18	Tring Athletic (9)	0–1	Norwich United (9)	173
19	London Colney (9)	0–1	Holbeach United (9)	103
20	Brantham Athletic (9)	1–3	Yaxley (9)	80
21	Hanworth Villa (9)	0–2	Erith & Belvedere (9)	65
22	Alresford Town (9)	1–2	Phoenix Sports (9)	73
23	Horley Town (9)	1–3	Greenwich Borough (9)	117
24	AFC Portchester (9)	0–1	Tunbridge Wells (9)	454
25	Colliers Wood United (9)	9–2	Lingfield (9)	57
26	Ascot United (9)	3–0	Newport (9)	117
27	Littlehampton Town (9)	3–3†	Ashford United (9)	120
replay	Ashford United (9)	2–1	Littlehampton Town (9)	123
28	Melksham Town (9)	3–2	Shepton Mallet (9)	407
29	Blackfield & Langley (9)	0–1	Highworth Town (9)	67
30	AFC St Austell (10)	6–1	Verwood Town (9)	236
31	Buckland Athletic (9)	1–4	Bodmin Town (9)	156
32	Bradford Town (9)	4–3	Odd Down (9)	81

Notes:

- † = After Extra Time

== Fourth round proper ==
Fourth round proper fixtures were played on 17 January 2015, with replays taking place no later than 22 January 2015. The draw was as follows:

Tie no	Home team (tier)	Score	Away team (tier)	Attendance
1	Walsall Wood (9)	1–1†	Shaw Lane Aquaforce (9)	169
Replay	Shaw Lane Aquaforce (9)	4–1	Walsall Wood (9)	131
2	North Shields (9)	4–1	Consett (9)	624
3	Thurnby Nirvana (9)	3–4†	Holbeach United (9)	183
4	Chadderton (10)	0–5	AFC Mansfield (10)	166
5	Worksop Town (9)	0–1†	Glossop North End (9)	650
6	Heanor Town (9)	0–1	Dunston UTS (9)	397
7	Tadcaster Albion (9)	3–2	Brocton (9)	618
8	Bodmin Town (10)	0–2	Phoenix Sports (9)	160

Tie no	Home team (tier)	Score	Away team (tier)	Attendance
9	Stanway Rovers (9)	1–0	Saffron Walden Town (10)	575
10	Ascot United (9)	4–2†	Colliers Wood United (9)	208
11	Bradford Town (9)	3–1	Melksham Town (9)	621
12	Ashford United (9)	0–5	Norwich United (9)	205
13	Greenwich Borough (9)	2–3	AFC St Austell (10)	274
14	Flackwell Heath (9)	3–0	Hullbridge Sports (9)	161
15	Erith & Belvedere (9)	1–0	Yaxley (9)	212
16	Highworth Town (9)	1–1	Tunbridge Wells (9)	254
Replay	Tunbridge Wells (9)	2–2†	Highworth Town (9)	788
Highworth Town advance 4–2 on penalties.

Notes:

- † = After Extra Time

== Fifth round proper ==
Fifth round proper fixtures were played on 7 February 2015, with replays taking place no later than 12 February 2015. The draw was as follows:

Tie no	Home team (tier)	Score	Away team (tier)	Attendance
1	Bradford Town (9)	0–2	Highworth Town (9)	468
2	AFC St Austell (10)	2–0	Stanway Rovers (9)	877
3	Ascot United (9)	3–0	Norwich United (9)	286
4	Shaw Lane Aquaforce (9)	3–2	Flackwell Heath (9)	282

Tie no	Home team (tier)	Score	Away team (tier)	Attendance
5	Glossop North End (9)	2–2†	Dunston UTS (9)	651
Replay	Dunston UTS (9)	1–3†	Glossop North End (9)	653
6	Holbeach United (9)	2–3†	Erith & Belvedere (9)	245
7	North Shields (9)	4–1	Phoenix Sports (9)	1,092
8	AFC Mansfield (10)	0–3	Tadcaster Albion (9)	604

Notes:

- † = After Extra Time

== Quarter-finals ==
Quarter-final fixtures were played on 28 February 2015, with replays taking place no later than 5 March 2015. The draw was as follows:

Tie no	Home team (tier)	Score	Away team (tier)	Attendance
1	AFC St Austell (10)	3–2	Ascot United (9)	1,433
2	Erith & Belvedere (9)	0–2	North Shields (9)	503

Tie no	Home team (tier)	Score	Away team (tier)	Attendance
3	Shaw Lane Aquaforce (9)	2–2†	Glossop North End (9)	334
replay	Glossop North End (9)	3–1†	Shaw Lane Aquaforce (9)	1,010
4	Highworth Town (9)	1–1†	Tadcaster Albion (9)	771
replay	Tadcaster Albion (9)	0–1	Highworth Town (9)	1,307

Notes:

- † = After Extra Time

== Semi-finals ==
Semi-final fixtures were played on 21 & 28 March 2015. The draw was as follows:

Leg no	Home team (tier)	Score	Away team (tier)	Attendance
1st	Highworth Town (9)	0–1	North Shields (9)	1,240
2nd	North Shields (9)	2–0	Highworth Town (9)	1,500

North Shields won 3–0 on aggregate.

Leg no	Home team (tier)	Score	Away team (tier)	Attendance
1st	AFC St Austell (10)	0–2	Glossop North End (9)	1,986
2nd	Glossop North End (9)	0–1	AFC St Austell (10)	1,303

Glossop North End won 2–1 on aggregate.

== Final ==
9 May 2015
15:00

Glossop North End	1–2 (a.e.t.)	North Shields
Tom Bailey 55'		Gareth Bainbridge 80'; Adam Forster 95'

Wembley Stadium, London
Attendance: 9,674
Referee: Andrew Madley (West Riding FA)
