= Aston F.C. =

Defunct association football club in England

Aston
- Full name: Aston Football Club
- Founded: 2006
- Ground: Pack Meadow, Coleshill
- Chairman: Mohammed Juned
Home colours

Aston Football Club was a football club based in Birmingham, England.

== History ==
The club was established in 2006 and joined Division Three of the Midland Combination from the Birmingham AFA. They were promoted to Division Two at the end of their first season after finishing as runners-up. Another runners-up finish in 2011–12 led to the club being promoted to Division One. When the Midland Combination merged with the Midland Alliance in 2014, Aston were placed in Division Two of the new league. They made their FA Vase début in 2014 and were briefly confused for Premier League team Aston Villa by Soccerbase.

Aston left the league after the 2014–15 season and dropped back into the renamed Birmingham & District League. The club were champions of Division Six in 2016–17, after which they were promoted to Division Five. They later merged into Silhill Football Club, becoming its 'D' team.

== Colours ==
The club wore navy and white halved shirts, white shorts and socks.

== Ground ==
The club played at Coleshill Town's Pack Meadow.

== Honours ==
- Birmingham & District League
  - Division Six champions: 2017–18

== Records ==
- Best FA Vase performance: First round, 2014–15
