= Mickleover Royals F.C. =

Mickleover Royals
- Full name: Mickleover Royals Football Club
- Founded: 2005 (as Derby Royals)
- Dissolved: 2015
- Ground: Raygar Stadium
- Capacity: 1500 (280 seated)
Home colours	Away colours

Mickelover Royals F.C. was an English football club based in the Derby suburb of Mickleover in Derbyshire. The club last played in the East Midlands Counties League.

== History ==
Mickleover Royals was formed in 2005 as an under 12s team, playing as Derby Royals. Three years later a men's team was formed. In 2011 the club joined the Midlands Regional Alliance. The following season the club changed its name to Mickleover Royals and was elected to the Central Midlands League, finishing in 6th place. The club made its debut in the FA Vase in the 2013–14 season. In the season 2014–15 Royals beat Basford United 1–0 with a 70th-minute goal by Kirk Francis in the second preliminary round of the FA Vase, while they were promoted to the East Midlands Counties League by winning the Central Midlands League South Division. However, due to financial difficulties, they resigned four matches into the new season and the club folded. Their record was expunged.

== Records ==
- Central Midlands League South Division
  - Champions 2014–15
- FA Vase
  - Second Qualifying Round 2013–14
- FA Vase
  - Second Round Proper 2014–15
