= Chippenham Park F.C. =

Association football club in England

Coordinates: 51°27′56.182″N 2°7′43.540″W

Chippenham Park
- Full name: Chippenham Park Football Club
- Founded: 2012
- Dissolved: 2019
- Ground: Hardenhuish Park, Chippenham
Home colours	Away colours

Chippenham Park Football Club was a football club based in Chippenham, Wiltshire, England, between 2012 and 2019. They were members of the Wiltshire League and Western League, and played at Hardenhuish Park.

== History ==
The club was formed as a feeder club to Chippenham Town in 2012, replacing the adult teams of FC Chippenham Youth. They were admitted to the Premier Division of the Wiltshire League, finishing third in their first season. This was enough for promotion to Division One of the Western League, where they played until 2019, when the club was dissolved and replaced by the Chippenham Town under-23 team.

== Ground ==
The club played at Chippenham Town's Hardenhuish Park. The ground opened in 1919, with a new clubhouse built in 1979 and floodlights installed in 1986. Covered standing is provided behind one goal and along the opposite side of the pitch to the main stand. This was built in 1993, replacing an earlier stand that had been damaged by storms. The pitch at Hardenhuish Park has a noticeable slope, downwards towards the Bristol Road end.

== Records ==
- Best FA Vase performance: Second round, 2014–15
