= 1931–32 Torquay United F.C. season =

Torquay United
1931–32 season
- Chairman: Charles Dear
- Manager: Frank Womack
- Third Division South: 19th
- FA Cup: First Round
- Top goalscorer: League: Billy Clayson (14); All: Billy Clayson (14)
- Highest home attendance: 6,000 v Southend United, 28 November 1931 (FA Cup)
- Lowest home attendance: 2,547 v Northampton Town, 5 December 1931 (Third Division South)
- Average home league attendance: 3,718
Home colours

The 1931–32 Torquay United F.C. season was Torquay United's fifth season in the Football League and their fifth consecutive season in Third Division South. The season runs from 1 July 1931 to 30 June 1932.

== Overview ==
Having just enjoyed their most successful season so far in the Football League, Torquay United were keen to build upon last season's achievements. Unfortunately, the season got off to a terrible start with an opening day 7–0 defeat at Crystal Palace. After conceding six goals to Watford in their second home game of the season, Torquay then had to endure a mortifying 10–2 defeat to Fulham at Craven Cottage. Results did slowly begin to improve after that humiliation but Torquay would never find themselves any higher than 15th in the League table all season. The team were also to make an early exit from the FA Cup, losing 3–1 at home to Southend United in the First Round.

Torquay also had to make do without last season's top goalscorer Jimmy Trotter for the second half of the season after he was sold to Watford in December. Billy Clayson did his best to fill Trotter's boots, eventually becoming this season's top scorer. However, Cyril Hemingway, returning for his second spell at the club, could not recreate the form which saw him top Torquay's goalscoring charts for the 1928–29 season. Nevertheless, Paignton born striker George Stabb showed much potential after signing from Dartmouth United, while another local lad, Lew Tapp, was also a promising new addition to the defence.

Torquay did at least have one memorable victory with an 8–1 defeat of Bristol Rovers on Easter Monday, but it was ultimately a hugely disappointing season for Frank Womack and the team. Finishing in 19th place and narrowly avoiding the need for re-election, it was clear that Torquay United were in desperate need of improvement.

== League statistics ==
=== Third Division South ===
Pos	Team	Pld	W	D	L	GF	GA	GAv	Pts	Promotion or relegation
17	Swindon Town	42	14	6	22	70	84	0.833	34	
18	Bristol Rovers	42	13	8	21	65	92	0.707	34	
19	Torquay United	42	12	9	21	72	106	0.679	33	
20	Mansfield Town	42	11	10	21	75	108	0.694	32	Transferred to the Third Division North
21	Gillingham	42	10	8	24	40	82	0.488	28	Re-elected

==== Results summary ====
Overall								Home						Away					
Pld	W	D	L	GF	GA	GAv	Pts	W	D	L	GF	GA	Pts	W	D	L	GF	GA	Pts
42	12	9	21	72	106	0.679	33	9	6	6	49	39	24	3	3	15	23	67	9

Source: rsssf.com

==== Results by round ====
Round	1	2	3	4	5	6	7	8	9	10	11	12	13	14	15	16	17	18	19	20	21	22	23	24	25	26	27	28	29	30	31	32	33	34	35	36	37	38	39	40	41	42
Ground	A	H	H	A	A	H	H	A	H	A	A	H	A	H	A	H	H	A	H	H	A	H	A	A	H	A	H	A	H	H	A	H	A	A	H	H	A	H	A	H	A	A
Result	L	D	L	L	W	L	D	L	W	W	D	D	L	D	D	L	W	L	W	L	L	W	L	L	D	W	L	L	W	W	L	W	L	D	W	W	L	D	L	L	L	L
Position	19	19	21	21	21	21	21	21	20	17	15	16	16	16	15	16	16	16	15	16	18	18	19	19	20	18	19	20	19	18	18	17	18	18	17	16	17	17	17	19	19	19

Source: statto.com
A = Away; H = Home; W = Win; D = Draw; L = Loss

== Results ==
=== Third Division South ===
29 Aug 1931	Crystal Palace	7–0	Torquay United	Selhurst Park
	Goal			Attendance: 18,479

2 Sep 1931	Torquay United	1–1	Bournemouth & Boscombe Athletic	Plainmoor
	Trotter		Goal	Attendance: 4,485

5 Sep 1931	Torquay United	3–6	Watford	Plainmoor
	Hutchinson; Trotter		Goal	Attendance: 4,559

7 Sep 1931	Fulham	10–2	Torquay United	Craven Cottage
	Goal		Hutchinson; Stabb	Attendance: 9,706

12 Sep 1931	Mansfield Town	2–4	Torquay United	Field Mill
	Goal		Birkett; Trotter; Hutchinson	Attendance: 8,499

16 Sep 1931	Torquay United	2–3	Fulham	Plainmoor
	Birkett; Trotter		Goal	Attendance: 5,056

19 Sep 1931	Torquay United	1–1	Brighton & Hove Albion	Plainmoor
	Trotter		Goal	Attendance: 4,590

26 Sep 1931	Norwich City	2–0	Torquay United	The Nest
	Goal			Attendance: 10,583

3 Oct 1931	Torquay United	2–1	Swindon Town	Plainmoor
	Waller; Trotter		Morris	Attendance: 4,483

10 Oct 1931	Clapton Orient	1–3	Torquay United	Lea Bridge Stadium
	Goal		Stabb; Birkett; Clayson	Attendance: 8,998

17 Oct 1931	Thames	1–1	Torquay United	West Ham Stadium
	Goal		Trotter	Attendance: 2,491

24 Oct 1931	Torquay United	1–1	Brentford	Plainmoor
	Hutchinson		Goal	Attendance: 4,650

31 Oct 1931	Exeter City	3–1	Torquay United	St James Park
	Goal		Fowler (pen.)	Attendance: 8,489

7 Nov 1931	Torquay United	3–3	Coventry City	Plainmoor
	Fowler (pen.); Hemingway		Goal	Attendance: 3,065

14 Nov 1931	Gillingham	1–1	Torquay United	Priestfield
	Goal		Fowler (pen.)	Attendance: 3,919

21 Nov 1931	Torquay United	1–2	Luton Town	Plainmoor
	Birkett		Goal	Attendance: 3,490

5 Dec 1931	Torquay United	4–1	Northampton Town	Plainmoor
	Trotter; Hutchinson; Fowler; Clayson		Goal	Attendance: 2,547

12 Dec 1931	Reading	4–1	Torquay United	Elm Park
	Goal		Trotter	Attendance: 5,507

19 Dec 1931	Torquay United	2–1	Southend United	Plainmoor
	Cooper; Hemingway		Goal	Attendance: 2,900

25 Dec 1931	Torquay United	2–3	Queens Park Rangers	Plainmoor
	Clayson; Birkett		Goal	Attendance: 4,999

26 Dec 1931	Queens Park Rangers	3–1	Torquay United	White City Stadium
	Goal		Hutchinson	Attendance: 24,133

2 Jan 1932	Torquay United	3–1	Crystal Palace	Plainmoor
	Hemingway; Waller; Clayson		Goal	Attendance: 2,703

13 Jan 1932	Cardiff City	5–2	Torquay United	Ninian Park
	Emmerson; McCambridge; Keating; Robbins		Fowler (pen.); Hemingway	Attendance: 3,890

16 Jan 1932	Watford	1–0	Torquay United	Vicarage Road
	Goal			Attendance: 9,335

23 Jan 1932	Torquay United	2–2	Mansfield Town	Plainmoor
	Waller; Clayson		Goal	Attendance: 3,370

30 Jan 1932	Brighton & Hove Albion	0–2	Torquay United	Goldstone Ground
			Waller; Fowler (pen.)	Attendance: 7,079

6 Feb 1932	Torquay United	2–4	Norwich City	Plainmoor
	Birkett		Goal	Attendance: 3,057

13 Feb 1932	Swindon Town	3–0	Torquay United	County Ground
	Starsmore; Morris			Attendance: 3,457

20 Feb 1932	Torquay United	3–0	Clapton Orient	Plainmoor
	Fowler (pen.); Cooper; Miller			Attendance: 2,708

27 Feb 1932	Torquay United	3–1	Thames	Plainmoor
	Clayson; Cooper		Goal	Attendance: 3,003

5 Mar 1932	Brentford	3–0	Torquay United	Griffin Park
	Goal			Attendance: 11,293

12 Mar 1932	Torquay United	2–1	Exeter City	Plainmoor
	Cooper; Birkett		Goal	Attendance: 5,839

19 Mar 1932	Coventry City	3–1	Torquay United	Highfield Road
	Goal		Cooper	Attendance: 9,923

25 Mar 1932	Bristol Rovers	1–1	Torquay United	Eastville Stadium
	Goal		Cooper	Attendance: 10,729

26 Mar 1932	Torquay United	1–0	Gillingham	Plainmoor
	Stabb			Attendance: 3,038

28 Mar 1932	Torquay United	8–1	Bristol Rovers	Plainmoor
	Anderson; Clayson; Hutchinson; Griffiths		Goal	Attendance: 2,830

2 Apr 1932	Luton Town	6–1	Torquay United	Kenilworth Road
	Goal		Hutchinson	Attendance: 5,778

9 Apr 1932	Torquay United	2–2	Cardiff City	Plainmoor
	Clayson		McCambridge	Attendance: 3,437

16 Apr 1932	Northampton Town	2–0	Torquay United	County Ground
	Goal			Attendance: 2,882

23 Apr 1932	Torquay United	1–4	Reading	Plainmoor
	Cooper		Goal	Attendance: 3,270

30 Apr 1932	Southend United	4–2	Torquay United	The Kursaal
	Goal		Clayson; Freer	Attendance: 5,471

7 May 1932	Bournemouth & Boscombe Athletic	5–0	Torquay United	Dean Court
	Goal			Attendance: 3,474

=== FA Cup ===
28 Nov 1931 First Round	Torquay United	1–3	Southend United	Plainmoor
	Trotter		Goal	Attendance: 6,000

== Club statistics ==
=== First team appearances ===
Nat	Pos	Player	Total		Third Division South		FA Cup
Nat	Pos	Player	Apps	Goals	Apps	Goals	Apps	Goals
(England)	GK	Joe Wright	29	0	28	0	1	0
(England)	GK	Laurie Millsom	14	0	14	0	0	0
(England)	DF	Jack Fowler	43	8	42	8	1	0
(England)	DF	Wally Webster	24	0	24	0	0	0
(England)	DF	Lew Tapp	19	0	18	0	1	0
(England)	DF	Jim Wright	2	0	2	0	0	0
(England)	MF	Don Hewitt	28	0	27	0	1	0
(England)	MF	Bob Smith	28	0	27	0	1	0
(England)	MF	Ted Anderson	19	0	19	0	0	0
(England)	MF	Jack Butler	18	0	18	0	0	0
(England)	MF	George Parkin	8	0	8	0	0	0
(England)	MF	Wilf Freer	6	1	6	1	0	0
(England)	MF	Bob Meacock	4	0	4	0	0	0
(England)	FW	Albert Hutchinson	43	10	42	10	1	0
(England)	FW	Billy Clayson	41	14	40	14	1	0
(England)	FW	Ralph Birkett	37	8	37	8	0	0
(England)	FW	Harry Waller	28	4	28	4	0	0
(England)	FW	Cyril Hemingway	24	4	23	4	1	0
(England)	FW	Jimmy Trotter	19	11	18	10	1	1
(England)	FW	Jack Cooper	14	7	14	7	0	0
(England)	FW	George Stabb	12	3	11	3	1	0
(Scotland)	FW	Willie Miller	7	1	7	1	0	0
(England)	FW	Arthur Griffiths	5	1	5	1	0	0
(England)	FW	? Rodgers	1	0	0	0	1	0

=== Top scorers ===
Place	Position	Nation	Name	Third Division South	FA Cup	Total
1	FW	(England)	Billy Clayson	14	0	14
2	FW	(England)	Jimmy Trotter	10	1	11
3	FW	(England)	Albert Hutchinson	10	0	10
4	FW	(England)	Ralph Birkett	8	0	8
=	DF	(England)	Jack Fowler	8	0	8
6	FW	(England)	Jack Cooper	7	0	7
7	FW	(England)	Cyril Hemingway	4	0	4
=	FW	(England)	Harry Waller	4	0	4
9	FW	(England)	George Stabb	3	0	3
10	MF	(England)	Ted Anderson	1	0	1
=	MF	(England)	Wilf Freer	1	0	1
=	FW	(England)	Arthur Griffiths	1	0	1
=	FW	(Scotland)	Willie Miller	1	0	1
			TOTAL	72	1	73

=== Transfers ===
==== In ====
First appearance	Nat.	Pos.	Name	From
29 August 1931	(England)	MF	George Parkin	West Ham United
2 September 1931	(England)	MF	Bob Meacock	Blackpool
5 September 1931	(England)	DF	Wally Webster	Sheffield United
7 September 1931	(England)	FW	Jack Cooper	Walsall
7 September 1931	(England)	FW	George Stabb	Dartmouth United
12 September 1931	(England)	DF	Lew Tapp	Newton Abbot F.C.
16 September 1931	(England)	FW	Cyril Hemingway	Wolverhampton Wanderers
26 December 1931	(England)	MF	Ted Anderson	Wolverhampton Wanderers
30 January 1932	(Scotland)	FW	Willie Miller	St Johnstone
28 March 1932	(England)	FW	Arthur Griffiths	Unattached

==== Out ====
Last appearance	Nat.	Pos.	Name	To
2 September 1931	(England)	DF	Jim Wright	Grimsby Town
26 September 1931	(England)	MF	Bob Meacock	Tranmere Rovers
12 December 1931	(England)	MF	George Parkin	Halifax Town
12 December 1931	(England)	FW	Jimmy Trotter	Watford
13 February 1932	(England)	GK	Joe Wright	Brighton & Hove Albion
20 February 1932	(England)	FW	Cyril Hemingway	Dartmouth United
19 March 1932	(Scotland)	FW	Willie Miller	Released
9 Apr 1932	(England)	MF	Bob Smith	Released
23 Apr 1932	(England)	FW	Jack Cooper	Released
30 Apr 1932	(England)	MF	Wilf Freer	Released
7 May 1932	(England)	MF	Jack Butler	Daring Club
7 May 1932	(England)	FW	Billy Clayson	Scarborough
7 May 1932	(England)	FW	Arthur Griffiths	Newport County
7 May 1932	(England)	GK	Laurie Millsom	Released
7 May 1932	(England)	FW	Harry Waller	Wrexham
