= List of Torquay United F.C. seasons =

Torquay United Football Club is an English professional association football club based in Torquay, Devon. This is a chronological list of all Torquay United seasons from 1899 up until the end of the 2022–23 season.

== History ==
Torquay United Football Club was originally formed in 1899. After first joining the East Devon League in 1900, the club then went on to join the Torquay & District League, becoming champions of that league in 1909. Encouraged by Plymouth Argyle and Exeter City turning professional, the people of Torquay were eager for United to join forces with the town's two other prominent football teams, Babbacombe and Ellacombe, with a view to creating a third professional club within Devon. Although Babbacombe rejected the idea of a merger, Torquay United and Ellacombe agreed to pool their resources and formed Torquay Town in 1910. Town won the Devon Senior Cup in their first season and became champions of the Plymouth & District League the following year. Despite a fierce rivalry existing between Torquay Town and Babbacombe, the two clubs were finally amalgamated in 1921 and the newly combined team reverted to the name of Torquay United and were admitted into the Western League. After one season in the Western League, United joined the Southern League and, after becoming champions of the Western Section, were elected into the Football League at the expense of Aberdare Athletic in 1927.

Despite having to seek re-election to the Football League after their debut season, Torquay soon managed to establish a place in the Third Division South, although without ever finishing higher than 10th position in all the seasons leading up to World War II. By the 1950s however, United had become a much more competitive side and narrowly missed out on promotion to the Second Division in 1957. When the Football League underwent restructuring in 1958, a poor season for United saw them placed in the newly created Division Four. Nevertheless, the 1960s proved fruitful for Torquay United and they spent the majority of the decade in Division Three, again coming close to promotion to Division Two in 1968.

However, when Torquay were again relegated from Division Three in 1972, it heralded a period of mediocrity which culminated in the club requiring re-election to the Football League in both 1985 and 1986. When automatic relegation into the Conference was introduced the following year, only a last minute equaliser against Crewe Alexandra on the final day of the season saved United from the drop. Torquay finally lifted themselves out of the basement division in 1991 after beating Blackpool in the Division Four play-off final, only to be relegated again the following season. After narrowly escaping relegation to the Conference in 1996, they were again contesting a play-off final in 1998, although this time they were beaten by Colchester United. Just three years later, in 2001, Torquay once again escaped expulsion into non-League football by beating Barnet on the final day of the season. By 2004, the club had bounced back again by achieving automatic promotion to the third tier of English football (now renamed League One) for the first time since 1966. Again relegated after just one season, worse was to come when, after two seasons in League Two, Torquay were finally relegated to the Conference in 2007. However, after just two years in the Conference, United secured a return to the Football League by beating Cambridge United in the 2009 Conference play-off final. Torquay again came close to returning to League One in 2011 but were narrowly beaten by Stevenage in the League Two play-off final.

Since their election to the Football League in 1927, Torquay United have completed 34 seasons in the third tier of English football, 42 seasons in the fourth, ten seasons in the fifth (below the professional League) and one season in the sixth (Conference/National League South). This list details all of the seasons played by Torquay United in English football from 1899 up until the last completed season. The list details the club's achievements in all major competitions, and the top scorers for each season in all competitions.

== Seasons ==
Season	League									FA Cup	League Cup	Other competitions		Top scorer(s)		Average attendance	Refs.
Season	Division	P	W	D	L	F	A	Pts	Pos	FA Cup	League Cup	Other competitions		Top scorer(s)		Average attendance	Refs.
1899–1900	^{[A]}									~							
1900–01	EDL ^{[B]}								4th	~							
1901–02	EDL								2nd	~							
1902–03	EDL								2nd	~		Devon Senior Cup	R1				
1903–04	EDL								3rd	~		East Devon Cup	R1				
1904–05	^{[C]}									~		East Devon Cup	R1				
1905–06	EDL								3rd	~		East Devon Cup	R1				
1906–07	EDL								3rd	~		Devon Senior Cup	R1				
1906–07	EDL								3rd	~		East Devon Cup	R2				
1907–08	T&DL ^{[D]}	12	5	0	7	24	43	10	4th	~		Devon Senior Cup	R2				
1907–08	T&DL ^{[D]}	12	5	0	7	24	43	10	4th	~		East Devon Cup	R1				
1908–09	T&DL	14	11	2	1	86	14	24	1st	~		East Devon Cup	R1				
1909–10	T&DL	16	7	3	6	24	23	17	4th	~		Devon Senior Cup	R1				
1909–10	T&DL	16	7	3	6	24	23	17	4th	~		East Devon Cup	R1				
1910–11 ^{[E]}	P&DL	24	13	3	8	54	33	29	5th	QR5		Devon Senior Cup	W				
1911–12	P&DL	30	23	4	3	85	29	50	1st	QR1		Devon Senior Cup	RU				
1912–13	P&DL	26	11	6	9	42	43	28	6th	~		^{[F]}					
1913–14	P&DL	26	10	4	12	55	52	24	10th	EPR		Devon Senior Cup	R1				
Competitive football suspended for the duration of World War I
1919–20	P&DL	24	7	1	16	41	46	15	10th	~		Devon Senior Cup	R1				
1920–21	P&DL	22	10	5	7	35	39	29	6th	EPR		^{[G]}					
1921–22 ^{[H]}	WL	14	6	2	6	25	17	14	5th	QR4		Devon Senior Cup	W				
1922–23	SLE	38	18	8	12	63	38	44	6th	QR1		Devon Professional Cup	RU				
1923–24	SLW ^{[I]}	34	19	7	8	59	25	45	4th	QR4		Devon Professional Cup	SF	Billy Kellock	23		
1924–25	SLW	38	9	11	18	41	73	29	15th	QR1		Devon Professional Cup	SF	Billy Kellock	13		
1925–26	SLW	26	12	5	9	59	46	26	6th	R1		Devon Professional Cup	SF	George Appleyard	29		
1925–26	WL ^{[J]}	18	9	4	5	28	22	22	3rd	R1		Devon Professional Cup	SF	George Appleyard	29		
1926–27	SLW	26	17	4	5	63	30	38	1st ^{[K]}	R1		Devon Professional Trophy	SF	Lew Griffiths; Len Marlow	25		
1926–27	WL	22	14	4	4	47	27	32	2nd	R1		Devon Professional Trophy	SF	Lew Griffiths; Len Marlow	25		
1927–28	Div 3S ^{[L]}	42	8	14	20	53	103	30	22nd ^{[M]}	~				Bert Turner	11		
1928–29	Div 3S	42	14	6	22	66	84	34	18th	R2				Cyril Hemingway	12		
1929–30	Div 3S	42	10	11	21	64	94	31	19th	R1				Joe Pointon	18		
1930–31	Div 3S	42	17	9	16	80	84	43	11th	R3				Jimmy Trotter	28		
1931–32	Div 3S	42	12	9	21	72	106	33	19th	R1				Billy Clayson	14		
1932–33	Div 3S	42	16	12	14	72	67	44	10th	R2				George Stabb	26		
1933–34	Div 3S	42	13	7	22	53	93	33	20th	R2		Third Division South Cup	RU	George Stabb	15		
1934–35	Div 3S	42	18	6	18	81	75	42	10th	R2		Third Division South Cup	R2	Albert Hutchinson	18		
1935–36	Div 3S	42	16	9	17	62	62	41	10th	R2		Third Division South Cup	R1	Albert Hutchinson	10		
1936–37	Div 3S	42	11	10	21	57	80	32	20th	R1		Third Division South Cup	SF	Ben Morton	27	4,048	
1937–38	Div 3S	42	9	12	21	38	73	30	20th	R1		Third Division South Cup	R1	Ben Morton; Albert Shelley	10	3,754	
1938–39	Div 3S	42	14	9	19	54	70	37	19th	R2		Third Division South Cup	F ^{[N]}	Ralph Allen	17	3,877	
1939–40	Div 3S ^{[O]}	3	0	3	0	4	4	3	14th					Jack Conley	2	3,926	
Competitive football suspended for the duration of World War II ^{[P]}
1945–46	^{[Q]}									R1				Bill Coley	1		
1946–47	Div 3S	42	15	12	15	52	61	42	11th	R1				Jack Conley	23	6,286	
1947–48	Div 3S	42	11	13	18	63	62	35	18th	R3				Ron Shaw	18	7,186	
1948–49	Div 3S	42	17	11	14	65	70	45	9th	R4				Jack Conley	19	7,939	
1949–50	Div 3S	42	19	10	13	66	63	48	5th	R2				Jack Conley	15	8,779	
1950–51	Div 3S	46	14	9	23	64	81	37	20th	R1				Sammy Collins	12	7,805	
1951–52	Div 3S	46	17	10	19	86	98	44	11th	R2				Sammy Collins; Ernie Edds	24	7,565	
1952–53	Div 3S	46	18	9	19	87	88	45	12th	R1				Sammy Collins	27	6,980	
1953–54	Div 3S	46	17	12	17	81	88	46	13th	R1				Sammy Collins	18	7,111	
1954–55	Div 3S	46	18	12	16	82	82	48	8th	R4				Sammy Collins	28	6,604	
1955–56	Div 3S	46	20	12	14	86	63	52	5th	R3				Sammy Collins	42 ^{[R]}	6,989	
1956–57	Div 3S	46	24	11	11	89	64	59	2nd	R3				Sammy Collins	35	8,014	
1957–58	Div 3S	46	11	13	22	49	74	35	21st ^{[S]}	R2				Tommy Northcott	14	7,112	
1958–59	Div 4	46	16	12	18	78	77	44	12th	R3				Tommy Northcott	21	5,393	
1959–60	Div 4	46	26	8	12	84	58	60	3rd ↑	R2				Graham Bond	25	6,812	
1960–61	Div 3	46	14	17	15	75	83	45	12th	R2	R2			Tommy Northcott	28	6,153	
1961–62	Div 3	46	15	6	25	76	100	36	21st ↓	R2	R1			Ernie Pym	21	4,985	
1962–63	Div 4	46	20	16	10	75	56	56	6th	R2	R2			Brian Handley	24	4,887	
1963–64	Div 4	46	20	11	15	80	54	51	6th	R2	R1			Robin Stubbs	25	5,199	
1964–65	Div 4	46	21	7	18	70	70	49	11th	R3	R2			Robin Stubbs	39	4,385	
1965–66	Div 4	46	24	10	12	72	49	58	3rd ↑	R1	R1			Tommy Spratt	18	6,208	
1966–67	Div 3	46	21	9	16	73	54	51	7th	R1	R1			Robin Stubbs	21	7,040	
1967–68	Div 3	46	21	11	14	60	56	53	4th	R1	R3			Robin Stubbs	10	9,096	
1968–69	Div 3	46	18	12	16	54	46	48	6th	R2	R1			Robin Stubbs	19	8,285	
1969–70	Div 3	46	14	17	15	62	59	45	13th	R1	R2			John Rudge	16	6,884	
1970–71	Div 3	46	19	11	16	54	57	49	10th	R4	R2			John Rudge	20	5,726	
1971–72	Div 3	46	10	12	24	41	69	32	23rd ↓	R3	R3			Alan Welsh	14	5,677	
1972–73	Div 4	46	12	17	17	44	47	41	18th	R2	R1			Mike Trebilcock	11	3,300	
1973–74	Div 4	46	13	17	16	52	57	43	16th	R1	R1			Eddie Rowles	10	3,392	
1974–75	Div 4	46	14	14	18	46	61	42	14th	R1	R1			Cliff Myers	8	2,868	
1975–76	Div 4	46	18	14	14	55	63	50	9th	R1	R3			Willie Brown	17	2,640	
1976–77	Div 4	46	17	9	20	59	67	43	16th	R1	R3			Willie Brown	22	2,958	
1977–78	Div 4	46	16	15	15	57	56	47	9th	R1	R1			Willie Brown	14	2,878	
1978–79	Div 4	46	19	8	19	58	65	46	11th	R3	R1			Les Lawrence	19	2,669	
1979–80	Div 4	46	15	17	14	70	69	47	9th	R2	R2			Steve Cooper	19	3,184	
1980–81	Div 4	46	18	5	23	55	63	41	17th	R3	R1			Gerry Fell	17	2,050	
1981–82	Div 4	46	14	13	19	47	59	55	15th	R1	R1	Football League Group Cup	R1	Tony Brown	11	2,248	
1982–83	Div 4	46	17	7	22	56	65	58	12th	R4	R1	Football League Trophy	R1	Steve Cooper	21	2,336	
1983–84	Div 4	46	18	13	15	59	64	67	9th	R1	R1	Associate Members' Cup	R1	John Sims	9	1,922	
1984–85	Div 4	46	9	14	23	38	63	41	24th ^{[T]}	R2	R1	Associate Members' Cup	R2	Derek Hall; Mario Walsh	5	1,386	
1985–86	Div 4	46	9	10	27	43	88	37	24th ^{[U]}	R2	R1	Associate Members' Cup	QFS	Mario Walsh	12	1,240	
1986–87	Div 4	46	10	18	18	56	72	48	23rd	R1	R1	Associate Members' Cup	R1	Paul Dobson	17	1,777	
1987–88	Div 4	46	21	14	11	66	41	77	5th ^{[V]}	R3	R2	Associate Members' Cup	SFS	Paul Dobson	25	3,005	
1988–89	Div 4	46	17	8	21	45	60	59	14th	R3	R1	Associate Members' Cup	RU	Dean Edwards	12	2,350	
1989–90	Div 4	46	15	12	19	53	66	57	15th	R4	R1	Associate Members' Cup	R1	Mark Loram	14	2,147	
1990–91	Div 4	46	18	18	10	64	47	72	7th ↑ ^{[W]}	R1	R2	Associate Members' Cup	QFS	Tommy Tynan	19	2,986	
1991–92	Div 3	46	13	8	25	42	68	47	23rd ↓	R2	R2	Associate Members' Cup	R1	Justin Fashanu	10	2,734	
1992–93	Div 3 ^{[X]}	42	12	7	23	45	67	43	19th	R1	R2	Football League Trophy	R2	Duane Darby	13	3,695	
1993–94	Div 3	42	17	16	9	64	56	67	6th ^{[Y]}	R2	R1	Football League Trophy	R1	Adrian Foster	16	3,437	
1994–95	Div 3	42	14	13	15	54	57	55	13th	R2	R2	Football League Trophy	R1	Richard Hancox	13	2,968	
1995–96	Div 3	46	5	14	27	30	84	29	24th ^{[Z]}	R2	R2	Football League Trophy	R1	Paul Baker; Paul Buckle; Ian Hathaway	4	2,454	
1996–97	Div 3	46	13	11	22	46	62	50	21st	R1	R1	Football League Trophy	R2	Rodney Jack	10	2,380	
1997–98	Div 3	46	21	11	14	68	59	74	5th ^{[AA]}	R2	R2	Football League Trophy	R2	Rodney Jack	16	2,679	
1998–99	Div 3	46	12	17	17	47	58	53	20th	R2	R1	Football League Trophy	QFS	Scott Partridge	14	2,600	
1999–2000	Div 3	46	19	12	15	62	52	69	9th	R3	R1	Football League Trophy	QFS	Tony Bedeau	17	2,555	
2000–01	Div 3	46	12	13	21	52	77	49	21st	R1	R1	Football League Trophy	R1	Kevin Hill	10	2,556	
2001–02	Div 3	46	12	15	19	46	63	51	19th	R1	R2	Football League Trophy	R1	David Graham	9	2,563	
2002–03	Div 3	46	16	18	12	71	71	66	9th	R2	R1	Football League Trophy	R1	Martin Gritton	16	3,132	
2003–04	Div 3	46	23	12	11	68	44	81	3rd ↑	R1	R1	Football League Trophy	R1	David Graham	23	3,460	
2004–05	Lge 1 ^{[AB]}	46	12	15	19	55	79	51	21st ↓	R1	R1	Football League Trophy	R2	Adebayo Akinfenwa	16	3,511	
2005–06	Lge 2	46	13	13	20	53	66	52	20th	R3	R1	Football League Trophy	R1	Tony Bedeau	11	2,851	
2006–07	Lge 2	46	7	14	25	36	63	35	24th ↓	R3	R1	Football League Trophy	R1	Jamie Ward	11	2,633	
2007–08	Conf	46	26	8	12	83	57	86	3rd ^{[AC]}	R2		FA Trophy	RU	Tim Sills	22	3,125	
2008–09	Conf	46	23	14	9	72	47	83	4th ↑ ^{[AD]}	R4		FA Trophy	R3	Tim Sills	17	2,243	
2009–10	Lge 2	46	14	15	17	64	55	57	17th	R3	R1	Football League Trophy	R2	Elliot Benyon	15	2,856	
2010–11	Lge 2	46	17	18	11	74	53	68 ^{[AE]}	7th ^{[AF]}	R4	R1	Football League Trophy	R2	Chris Zebroski	15	2,631	
2011–12	Lge 2	46	23	12	11	63	50	81	5th ^{[AG]}	R2	R1	Football League Trophy	R1	Rene Howe	14	2,869	
2012–13	Lge 2	46	13	14	19	55	62	53	19th	R1	R1	Football League Trophy	R1	Rene Howe	16	2,709	
2013–14	Lge 2	46	12	9	25	42	66	45	24th ↓	R1	R1	Football League Trophy	R1	Jordan Chapell	5	2,642	
2014–15	Conf	46	16	13	17	64	60	61	13th	QR4		FA Trophy	SF	Ryan Bowman	19	1,949	
2015–16	NLTD	46	13	12	21	54	76	51	18th	QR4		FA Trophy	QF	Nathan Blissett	8	1,803	
2016–17	NLTD	46	14	11	21	54	61	53	17th	QR4		FA Trophy	R1	Brett Williams	10	1,888	
2017–18	NLTD	46	10	12	24	45	73	42	22nd ↓	QR4		FA Trophy	R1	Rhys Healey; Jamie Reid	6	1,731	
2018–19	NLS	42	27	7	8	93	41	88	1st ↑	R1		FA Trophy	R1	Jamie Reid	29	2,597	
2019–20	NLTD	36	14	6	16	56	61	48	14th	R1		FA Trophy	R2	Jamie Reid	18	2,596	
2020–21	NLTD	42	23	11	8	68	39	80	2nd	R1		FA Trophy	QF	Asa Hall; Connor Lemonheigh-Evans	10	n/a	
2021–22	NLTD	42	18	12	14	66	54	66	11th	QR4		FA Trophy	R3	Armani Little	15	2,576	
2022–23	NLTD	46	12	12	22	58	80	48	21st ↓	R1		FA Trophy	R5	Aaron Jarvis	15	2,422	

== Key ==
1st	2nd	3rd and Play-offs	↑	↓
Champions	Runners-up	Third Place and Play-offs	Promoted	Relegated

Key to league record:

- P – Played
- W – Games won
- D – Games drawn
- L – Games lost
- F – Goals for
- A – Goals against
- Pts – Points
- Pos – Final position
- ↑ – Promoted
- ↓ – Relegated

Key to divisions:

- Lge 1 – Football League One
- Lge 2 – Football League Two
- Div 3 – Football League Third Division
- Div 3S – Football League Third Division South
- Div 4 – Football League Fourth Division
- NLTD – National League Top Division
- NLS – National League South
- Conf – Conference National
- SLE – Southern League English Section
- SLW – Southern League Western Section
- WL – Western League
- P&DL – Plymouth & District League
- EDL – East Devon League
- T&DL – Torquay & District League

Key to rounds:

- F – Final
- RU – Runners-up
- SF – Semi-final
- SFS – Southern semi-final
- QFS – Southern quarter-final
- R- – Round
- QR- – Qualifying Round
- EPR – Extra Preliminary Round
- ~ – Did not enter

Division changes shown in bold.
Abandoned league competitions shown in italics.
Goalscorers shown in bold were division top scorers for that season.

== Notes ==
A. Torquay United played no competitive matches during their first season.
B. East Devon League tables currently not traced.
C. Withdrew from East Devon League due to lack of a suitable home ground.
D. Torquay began the 1907–08 season in the East Devon League but later replaced the reserve side in the Torquay & District League after the EDL folded.
E. Before the beginning of the 1910–11 season, Torquay United merged with Ellacombe to become Torquay Town.
F. Withdrew from Devon Senior Cup after failing to agree First Round match terms with Babbacombe.
G. Torquay Town refused entry to Devon Senior Cup after late application to Devon County Football Association.
H. Before the beginning of the 1921–22 season, Torquay Town merged with Babbacombe to become Torquay United once more.
I. From the beginning of the 1923–24, the Southern League English and Welsh sections were restructured into the Western and Eastern sections.
J. Rejoined the Western League due to depleted Southern League fixture list.
K. Beaten in the Southern League championship play-off final by Eastern Section champions Brighton & Hove Albion Reserves.
L. Torquay United elected to the Football League at the expense of Aberdare Athletic.
M. Despite finishing bottom of the Third Division South, Torquay were successfully re-elected to the Football League.
N. Although Torquay had qualified for the Third Division South Cup Final, their opponents (either Queens Park Rangers or Port Vale) had yet to be decided. The final, which was scheduled for September 1939, was not played due to the outbreak of World War II and the tournament would never be contested again.
O. Due to the outbreak of World War II in September 1939, the Football League was abandoned after Torquay had played just three matches. This season's statistics are for reference only and do not count towards the official records.

P. Despite the Football League and FA Cup being abandoned for the duration of World War II, several regional Wartime Leagues were organised, in which Torquay took part during the 1939–40 and 1945–46 seasons. These matches do not count towards official records.
Q. Although the FA Cup resumed in 1945, the Football League did not restart until 1946.
R. As well as being the 1955–56 Third Division South's top goalscorer with 40 goals, Sammy Collins' 42 goals in all competitions remains a club record.
S. At the end of the 1957–58 season, the Third Divisions North and South were amalgamated with teams in the top half of each division being placed in Division Three and those in the bottom going into Division Four. Torquay's 21st position resulted in them taking their place in Division Four.
T. For the first time since their debut Football League season, Torquay required re-election to remain in the League.
U. For the second season in succession, Torquay had to rely upon re-election to remain in the Football League.
V. Beaten in the Division Four play-off final by Swansea City.
W. Defeated Blackpool in the Division Four play-off final.
X. Due to the creation of the Premier League, the old Division Four was renamed Division Three from the beginning of the 1992–93 season.
Y. Beaten in the Division Three play-off semi-finals by Preston North End.
Z. Torquay were spared relegation from the Football League due to the unsuitability of Conference winner Stevenage Borough's ground.
AA. Beaten in the Division Three play-off final by Colchester United.
AB. As from the beginning of the 2004–05 season, Division Three and Four were renamed League One and Two.
AC. Beaten in the Conference play-off semi-finals by Exeter City.
AD. Defeated Cambridge United in the Conference play-off final.
AE. Deducted 1 point for fielding an ineligible player.
AF. Beaten in the League Two play-off final by Stevenage.
AG. Beaten in the League Two play-off semi-final by Cheltenham Town.
