= 1930–31 Torquay United F.C. season =

Torquay United
1930–31 season
- Chairman: Charles Dear
- Manager: Frank Womack
- Third Division South: 11th
- FA Cup: Third round
- Top goalscorer: League: Jimmy Trotter (26); All: Jimmy Trotter (28)
- Highest home attendance: 6,944 v Brentford, 11 October 1930 (Third Division South)
- Lowest home attendance: 1,745 v Bournemouth & Boscombe Athletic, 21 January 1931 (Third Division South)
- Average home league attendance: 4,373
Home colours

The 1930–31 Torquay United F.C. season was Torquay United's fourth season in the Football League and their fourth consecutive season in Third Division South. The season runs from 1 July 1930 to 30 June 1931.

== Overview ==
After finishing no higher than 18th in their first three Football League campaigns, Torquay manager Frank Womack was determined to build a team that would make a more competitive showing in the Third Division South. With that in mind, Womack made several impressive signings during the close season, among them Arsenal centre half Jack Butler and Leicester City keeper Joe Wright. Finally it appeared that the Magpies had hit upon a winning formula and by early October they were second in the Third Division South table, just four points behind leaders Notts County. Much of the upturn in Torquay's fortunes was due to the scoring prowess of new centre forward Jimmy Trotter who had already scored thirteen goals before the end of October and would go on to score a total of 28 goals in all competitions by the end of the season. Trotter was ably assisted by two more new forwards in Billy Clayson and Albert Hutchinson, who contributed another 25 goals between them. Hutchinson was to eventually prove a very loyal servant to Torquay, remaining with the club up until the outbreak of World War II.

However, despite their blistering start to the season, Torquay then hit upon a run of bad form towards the end of the year in which they lost six out of seven games and saw them drop to 12th position by Christmas Day. Results began to improve again in the New Year when the talented young outside right Ralph Birkett was re-introduced into the team. However, despite Trotter, Clayson and Hutchinson appearing to be firing on all cylinders again, it would not be enough for the Magpies to make a challenge for promotion and they would have to settle for an 11th-place finish at the end of the season.

Perhaps Torquay's mid-season slump may have been due to the distractions of the FA Cup which saw the Magpies defeat Southend United and Accrington Stanley to reach the third round for the first time in their history. They were rewarded with a trip to Second Division side Bury and, far from being overawed by the occasion, Torquay came back from Gigg Lane with a 1–1 draw, earning a replay at Plainmoor. Unfortunately, despite a battling performance from United which forced the replay into extra time, it was Bury who were to make it through to the fourth round.

It had been by far Torquay's most successful season to date and there was now a sense that the club was finally making progress in the Football League.

== League statistics ==
=== Third Division South ===
| Pos | Team | Pld | W | D | L | GF | GA | GAv | Pts |
|---|---|---|---|---|---|---|---|---|---|
| 9 | Fulham | 42 | 18 | 7 | 17 | 77 | 75 | 1.027 | 43 |
| 10 | Bournemouth & Boscombe Athletic | 42 | 15 | 13 | 14 | 72 | 73 | 0.986 | 43 |
| 11 | Torquay United | 42 | 17 | 9 | 16 | 80 | 84 | 0.952 | 43 |
| 12 | Swindon Town | 42 | 18 | 6 | 18 | 89 | 94 | 0.947 | 42 |
| 13 | Exeter City | 42 | 17 | 8 | 17 | 84 | 90 | 0.933 | 42 |

==== Results summary ====
| Overall | | | | | | | | Home | | | | | | Away | | | | | |
| Pld | W | D | L | GF | GA | GAv | Pts | W | D | L | GF | GA | Pts | W | D | L | GF | GA | Pts |
|---|---|---|---|---|---|---|---|---|---|---|---|---|---|---|---|---|---|---|---|
| 42 | 17 | 9 | 16 | 80 | 84 | 0.952 | 43 | 13 | 5 | 3 | 56 | 26 | 31 | 4 | 4 | 13 | 24 | 58 | 12 |

Source: rsssf.com

==== Results by round ====
| Round | 1 | 2 | 3 | 4 | 5 | 6 | 7 | 8 | 9 | 10 | 11 | 12 | 13 | 14 | 15 | 16 | 17 | 18 | 19 | 20 | 21 | 22 | 23 | 24 | 25 | 26 | 27 | 28 | 29 | 30 | 31 | 32 | 33 | 34 | 35 | 36 | 37 | 38 | 39 | 40 | 41 | 42 |
|---|---|---|---|---|---|---|---|---|---|---|---|---|---|---|---|---|---|---|---|---|---|---|---|---|---|---|---|---|---|---|---|---|---|---|---|---|---|---|---|---|---|---|
| Ground | A | H | H | A | A | H | H | H | A | A | H | H | A | H | A | H | A | A | H | A | A | H | H | A | H | H | A | H | H | A | A | H | A | H | A | H | A | A | H | A | H | A |
| Result | L | W | W | L | D | W | W | D | W | W | L | W | L | W | L | L | L | L | W | L | L | D | W | W | D | D | L | L | W | D | W | W | D | W | L | W | D | L | W | L | D | L |
| Position | 15 | 7 | 3 | 6 | 11 | 6 | 5 | 4 | 3 | 2 | 3 | 3 | 3 | 3 | 3 | 7 | 9 | 9 | 8 | 9 | 12 | 10 | 10 | 9 | 9 | 8 | 10 | 12 | 11 | 11 | 9 | 8 | 9 | 7 | 10 | 8 | 8 | 10 | 8 | 10 | 10 | 11 |

Source: statto.com
A = Away; H = Home; W = Win; D = Draw; L = Loss

== Match of the season ==
BURY 1–1 TORQUAY UNITED
FA Cup third round
Gigg Lane, 10 January 1931

| BURY | TORQUAY UNITED |

TORQUAY UNITED:
| GK | 1 | (England) Joe Wright |
| RB | 2 | (England) Jim Wright |
| LB | 3 | (England) Dick Hill |
| RH | 4 | (England) Billy Clayson |
| CH | 5 | (England) Jack Butler |
| LH | 6 | (England) Bob Smith |
| OR | 7 | (England) Harry Waller |
| IR | 8 | (England) Albert Hutchinson |
| CF | 9 | (England) Jimmy Trotter |
| IL | 10 | (England) Harry Keeling |
| OL | 11 | (England) William Bell |

In keeping with a season which had perhaps exceeded many expectations, Torquay United found themselves in the third round of the FA Cup for the very first time in their history. Having first seen off Third Division South rivals Southend United and Accrington Stanley of the Third Division North in consecutive away 1–0 victories, the Magpies then had to make another long trip up north to face Second Division side Bury. With the Lancashire team currently lying in 7th place in Division Two, few would have expected Torquay to have gained any kind of result when they visited Gigg Lane.

The side chosen by Frank Womack reflected the changes he had brought to the team for this season with only Bob Smith, Harry Waller and Harry Keeling having played for the Magpies during the previous campaign. This was a notable match for Bob Smith as he was making his 100th appearance for the club, the first player to reach that landmark for Torquay United and he was, in fact, an ever-present for the Magpies this season appearing in all 46 games. Protecting Joe Wright's goal was his namesake Jim Wright and Dick Hill while former Arsenal centre half Jack Butler was flanked in the midfield by Smith and Billy Clayson. Clayson was unusually playing in the right half position having been replaced in his more accustomed role of inside forward by Harry Keeling in the previous match, an away trip to Gillingham. Having scored two goals in that game, Keeling retained his position in the forward line forcing Clayson to make the switch into midfield, pushing Jim Wright into the right back position at the expense of Jack Fowler. Taking the outside forward positions were Harry Waller and William Bell with Albert Hutchinson and potent centre forward Jimmy Trotter completing the forward line. Perhaps unsurprisingly, it was Trotter who forced an unlikely replay by scoring his 18th goal of the season so far.

With the replay taking place at Plainmoor four days later, Trotter scored once again to take the match into extra time. However, on this occasion the Shakers superiority prevailed and eventually won the tie 2–1 in extra time. Ironically, Bury were knocked out in the next round by Torquay's local rivals Exeter City. As for Torquay, it would be another seventeen years before they would reach the third round of the FA Cup again.

== Results ==
=== Third Division South ===
| 30 Aug 1930 | Newport County | 2–1 | Torquay United | Somerton Park |
| | Riley; Mason | | Mackie | Attendance: 3,905 |

| 3 Sep 1930 | Torquay United | 3–1 | Crystal Palace | Plainmoor |
| | Bell; Fisher; Hutchinson | | Goal | Attendance: 6,163 |

| 6 Sep 1930 | Torquay United | 3–0 | Gillingham | Plainmoor |
| | Hutchinson; Mackie; High | | | Attendance: 5,728 |

| 8 Sep 1930 | Southend United | 6–3 | Torquay United | The Kursaal |
| | Goal | | Trotter; Bell | Attendance: 5,656 |

| 13 Sep 1930 | Exeter City | 2–2 | Torquay United | St James Park |
| | Goal | | Trotter | Attendance: 8,734 |

| 17 Sep 1930 | Torquay United | 3–1 | Southend United | Plainmoor |
| | Trotter; Clayson | | Goal | Attendance: 3,077 |

| 20 Sep 1930 | Torquay United | 3–1 | Brighton & Hove Albion | Plainmoor |
| | Bell; Smith; Butler | | Goal | Attendance: 4,789 |

| 24 Sep 1930 | Torquay United | 3–3 | Bristol Rovers | Plainmoor |
| | Trotter; Clayson | | Goal | Attendance: 5,057 |

| 27 Sep 1930 | Walsall | 0–4 | Torquay United | Fellows Park |
| | | | Trotter (pen.); Bell | Attendance: 6,490 |

| 4 Oct 1930 | Northampton Town | 0–3 | Torquay United | County Ground |
| | | | Waller | Attendance: 11,852 |

| 11 Oct 1930 | Torquay United | 0–3 | Brentford | Plainmoor |
| | | | Goal | Attendance: 6,944 |

| 18 Oct 1930 | Torquay United | 6–2 | Queens Park Rangers | Plainmoor |
| | Trotter; Clayson; Hutchinson | | Goal | Attendance: 5,123 |

| 25 Oct 1930 | Norwich City | 3–0 | Torquay United | The Nest |
| | Goal | | | Attendance: 9,012 |

| 1 Nov 1930 | Torquay United | 5–1 | Thames | Plainmoor |
| | Hutchinson; Clayson; Trotter | | Goal | Attendance: 3,698 |

| 8 Nov 1930 | Clapton Orient | 4–0 | Torquay United | Lea Bridge Stadium |
| | Goal | | | Attendance: 5,403 |

| 15 Nov 1930 | Torquay United | 1–4 | Notts County | Plainmoor |
| | Hutchinson | | Goal | Attendance: 6,730 |

| 22 Nov 1930 | Watford | 6–0 | Torquay United | Vicarage Road |
| | Goal | | | Attendance: 4,950 |

| 6 Dec 1930 | Swindon Town | 4–0 | Torquay United | County Ground |
| | Goal | | | Attendance: 3,658 |

| 17 Dec 1930 | Torquay United | 3–1 | Fulham | Plainmoor |
| | Waller; Trotter; Bell | | Goal | Attendance: 2,846 |

| 20 Dec 1930 | Coventry City | 6–1 | Torquay United | Highfield Road |
| | Goal | | Trotter | Attendance: 8,289 |

| 25 Dec 1930 | Luton Town | 3–1 | Torquay United | Kenilworth Road |
| | Goal | | Hill | Attendance: 7,553 |

| 26 Dec 1930 | Torquay United | 1–1 | Luton Town | Plainmoor |
| | Hutchinson | | Goal | Attendance: 6,619 |

| 27 Dec 1930 | Torquay United | 3–0 | Newport County | Plainmoor |
| | Wright; Trotter; Waller | | | Attendance: 4,561 |

| 3 Jan 1931 | Gillingham | 2–3 | Torquay United | Priestfield |
| | Goal | | Keeling; Bell | Attendance: 3,381 |

| 17 Jan 1931 | Torquay United | 0–0 | Exeter City | Plainmoor |
| | | | | Attendance: 4,903 |

| 21 Jan 1931 | Torquay United | 4–4 | Bournemouth & Boscombe Athletic | Plainmoor |
| | Birkett; Trotter; Clayson | | Goal | Attendance: 1,745 |

| 28 Jan 1931 | Brighton & Hove Albion | 3–0 | Torquay United | Goldstone Ground |
| | Goal | | | Attendance: 4,763 |

| 31 Jan 1931 | Torquay United | 0–1 | Walsall | Plainmoor |
| | | | Goal | Attendance: 1,993 |

| 7 Feb 1931 | Torquay United | 3–0 | Northampton Town | Plainmoor |
| | Waller; Birkett; Trotter | | | Attendance: 4,270 |

| 14 Feb 1931 | Brentford | 0–0 | Torquay United | Griffin Park |
| | | | | Attendance: 6,464 |

| 21 Feb 1931 | Queens Park Rangers | 1–2 | Torquay United | Loftus Road |
| | Goal | | Clayson; Hutchinson | Attendance: 9,830 |

| 28 Feb 1931 | Torquay United | 2–0 | Norwich City | Plainmoor |
| | Butler; Hutchinson | | | Attendance: 3,282 |

| 7 Mar 1931 | Thames | 1–1 | Torquay United | West Ham Stadium |
| | Goal | | Keeling | Attendance: 1,076 |

| 14 Mar 1931 | Torquay United | 5–2 | Clapton Orient | Plainmoor |
| | Birkett; Trotter; Hutchinson; Clayson; Waller | | Goal | Attendance: 3,672 |

| 21 Mar 1931 | Notts County | 2–0 | Torquay United | Meadow Lane |
| | Goal | | | Attendance: 11,951 |

| 28 Mar 1931 | Torquay United | 3–1 | Watford | Plainmoor |
| | Fowler (pen.); Clayson; Trotter | | Goal | Attendance: 3,547 |

| 4 Apr 1931 | Bournemouth & Boscombe Athletic | 2–2 | Torquay United | Dean Court |
| | Goal | | Trotter | Attendance: 5,381 |

| 6 Apr 1931 | Bristol Rovers | 3–1 | Torquay United | Eastville Stadium |
| | Goal | | Clayson | Attendance: 5,863 |

| 11 Apr 1931 | Torquay United | 5–0 | Swindon Town | Plainmoor |
| | Clayson; Trotter; Hutchinson | | | Attendance: 3,814 |

| 18 Apr 1931 | Fulham | 3–0 | Torquay United | Craven Cottage |
| | Goal | | | Attendance: 8,840 |

| 25 Apr 1931 | Torquay United | 0–0 | Coventry City | Plainmoor |
| | | | | Attendance: 3,270 |

| 2 May 1931 | Crystal Palace | 5–0 | Torquay United | Selhurst Park |
| | Goal | | | Attendance: 12,172 |

=== FA Cup ===
| 29 Nov 1930 First round | Southend United | 0–1 | Torquay United | The Kursaal |
| | | | Burrows | Attendance: 10,000 |

| 13 Dec 1930 Second round | Accrington Stanley | 0–1 | Torquay United | Peel Park |
| | | | Bell | Attendance: 6,009 |

| 10 Jan 1931 Third round | Bury | 1–1 | Torquay United | Gigg Lane |
| | Goal | | Trotter | Attendance: 9,783 |

| 14 Jan 1931 Third round replay | Torquay United | 1–2 (a.e.t.) | Bury | Plainmoor |
| | Trotter | | Goal | Attendance: 6,167 |

== Club statistics ==
=== First team appearances ===
| Nat | Pos | Player | Total | | Third Division South | | FA Cup |
| Nat | Pos | Player | Apps | Goals | Apps | Goals | Apps | Goals |
|---|---|---|---|---|---|---|---|---|
| (England) | GK | Joe Wright | 45 | 0 | 41 | 0 | 4 | 0 |
| (England) | GK | Laurie Millsom | 1 | 0 | 1 | 0 | 0 | 0 |
| (England) | DF | Jack Fowler | 38 | 1 | 37 | 1 | 1 | 0 |
| (England) | DF | Dick Hill | 32 | 1 | 28 | 1 | 4 | 0 |
| (England) | DF | Jim Wright | 30 | 1 | 26 | 1 | 4 | 0 |
| (England) | MF | Bob Smith | 46 | 1 | 42 | 1 | 4 | 0 |
| (England) | MF | Jack Butler | 35 | 2 | 32 | 2 | 3 | 0 |
| (England) | MF | Arthur Phoenix | 18 | 0 | 18 | 0 | 0 | 0 |
| (England) | MF | Stan High | 16 | 1 | 16 | 0 | 0 | 0 |
| (England) | MF | Wilf Freer | 4 | 0 | 3 | 0 | 1 | 0 |
| (England) | MF | Arthur Weightman | 4 | 0 | 4 | 0 | 0 | 0 |
| (England) | MF | Don Hewitt | 2 | 0 | 2 | 0 | 0 | 0 |
| (England) | FW | Albert Hutchinson | 46 | 11 | 42 | 11 | 4 | 0 |
| (England) | FW | Jimmy Trotter | 42 | 28 | 38 | 26 | 4 | 2 |
| (England) | FW | Billy Clayson | 39 | 14 | 35 | 14 | 4 | 0 |
| (England) | FW | Harry Waller | 34 | 7 | 30 | 7 | 4 | 0 |
| (England) | FW | William Bell | 32 | 7 | 28 | 6 | 4 | 1 |
| (England) | FW | Ralph Birkett | 20 | 3 | 20 | 3 | 0 | 0 |
| (England) | FW | Fred Fisher | 7 | 1 | 7 | 1 | 0 | 0 |
| (England) | FW | Harry Keeling | 6 | 3 | 4 | 3 | 2 | 0 |
| (Scotland) | FW | Robert Mackie | 6 | 2 | 6 | 2 | 0 | 0 |
| (England) | FW | Leslie Burrows | 3 | 1 | 2 | 0 | 1 | 1 |

=== Top scorers ===
| Place | Position | Nation | Name | Third Division South | FA Cup | Total |
|---|---|---|---|---|---|---|
| 1 | FW | (England) | Jimmy Trotter | 26 | 2 | 28 |
| 2 | FW | (England) | Billy Clayson | 14 | 0 | 14 |
| 3 | FW | (England) | Albert Hutchinson | 11 | 0 | 11 |
| 4 | FW | (England) | William Bell | 6 | 1 | 7 |
| = | FW | (England) | Harry Waller | 7 | 0 | 7 |
| 6 | FW | (England) | Ralph Birkett | 3 | 0 | 3 |
| = | FW | (England) | Harry Keeling | 3 | 0 | 3 |
| 8 | MF | (England) | Jack Butler | 2 | 0 | 2 |
| = | FW | (Scotland) | Robert Mackie | 2 | 0 | 2 |
| 10 | FW | (England) | Leslie Burrows | 0 | 1 | 1 |
| = | FW | (England) | Fred Fisher | 1 | 0 | 1 |
| = | DF | (England) | Jack Fowler | 1 | 0 | 1 |
| = | MF | (England) | Stan High | 1 | 0 | 1 |
| = | DF | (England) | Dick Hill | 1 | 0 | 1 |
| = | MF | (England) | Bob Smith | 1 | 0 | 1 |
| = | DF | (England) | Jim Wright | 1 | 0 | 1 |
| | | | Own goals | 0 | 0 | 0 |
| | | | TOTAL | 80 | 4 | 84 |

=== Transfers ===
==== In ====
| First appearance | Nat. | Pos. | Name | From |
|---|---|---|---|---|
| 30 August 1930 | (England) | FW | William Bell | Leicester City |
| 30 August 1930 | (England) | MF | Jack Butler | Arsenal |
| 30 August 1930 | (England) | FW | Fred Fisher | Notts County |
| 30 August 1930 | (England) | DF | Dick Hill | Millwall |
| 30 August 1930 | (England) | FW | Albert Hutchinson | Luton Town |
| 30 August 1930 | (Scotland) | FW | Robert Mackie | Coleraine |
| 30 August 1930 | (England) | FW | Jimmy Trotter | Sheffield Wednesday |
| 30 August 1930 | (England) | GK | Joe Wright | Leicester City |
| 13 September 1930 | (England) | FW | Billy Clayson | Scarborough |
| 27 September 1930 | (England) | DF | Jim Wright | Okehampton F.C. |
| 18 October 1930 | (England) | MF | Don Hewitt | Coventry City |
| 15 November 1930 | (England) | MF | Arthur Weightman | Newark Town |
| 23 November 1930 | (England) | FW | Les Burrows | Bristol City |
| 17 December 1930 | (England) | MF | Wilf Freer | Birmingham City |
| 25 December 1930 | (England) | MF | Arthur Phoenix | Bath City |

==== Out ====
| Last appearance | Nat. | Pos. | Name | To |
|---|---|---|---|---|
| 31 January 1931 | (England) | FW | Les Burrows | Released |
| 7 March 1931 | (England) | FW | Harry Keeling | Swindon Town |
| 28 March 1931 | (England) | MF | Stan High | Accrington Stanley |
| 6 April 1931 | (England) | DF | Dick Hill | Newark Town |
| 25 April 1931 | (England) | FW | William Bell | Released |
| 2 May 1931 | (England) | FW | Fred Fisher | Mansfield Town |
| 2 May 1931 | (Scotland) | FW | Robert Mackie | Released |
| 2 May 1931 | (England) | MF | Arthur Phoenix | Mansfield Town |
| 2 May 1931 | (England) | MF | Arthur Weightman | Mansfield Town |
