= 1932–33 Torquay United F.C. season =

Torquay United
1932–33 season
- Chairman: Charles Dear
- Manager: Frank Brown
- Third Division South: 10th
- FA Cup: Second round
- Top goalscorer: League: George Stabb (24); All: George Stabb (26)
- Highest home attendance: 7,683 v Exeter City, 17 September 1932 (Third Division South)
- Lowest home attendance: 2,462 v Bristol Rovers, 26 April 1933 (Third Division South)
- Average home league attendance: 3,991
Home colours

The 1932–33 Torquay United F.C. season was Torquay United's sixth season in the Football League and their sixth consecutive season in Third Division South. The season runs from 1 July 1932 to 30 June 1933.

== Overview ==
After finishing in 19th place in their previous Third Division South campaign, it was clear that Torquay United needed to make major changes if they had any intentions of challenging for promotion to the Second Division. However, believing the club lacked the ambition to do so, manager Frank Womack left Torquay at the end of the 1931–32 season. His replacement was Frank Brown who had played for the Magpies in their non-League days and had subsequently become a trainer under Percy Mackrill and then Womack. His first task was to rebuild the team, replacing stalwarts such as Bob Smith, Jack Butler and Laurie Millsom with newer, younger faces. Of the team which lined up on the opening match of the season against Coventry City, eight out of the starting eleven were debutants, with new goalkeeper Percy Maggs and centre back Jack Tennant becoming ever-presents throughout the campaign, as was right half Ted Anderson who had joined the Magpies for the second half of the previous season.

While two draws and two defeats in their opening four games suggested the unfamiliar team had yet to find their feet, an 8–1 victory over Southend United at Plainmoor in early September certainly helped the squad to settle into the new season. Torquay would prove to be particularly strong at home with only two defeats at Plainmoor throughout the entire season. However, away from home it was a slightly different story with the team suffering twelve losses and only four victories on the road. Nevertheless, by the penultimate game of the season, Torquay's excellent home form had propelled them up to 8th position in the table and a victory against Queens Park Rangers on the final day could have seen the club finish in an unprecedented 5th place. As it was, a 1–1 draw at the White City Stadium and with other results going against them, the Magpies had to ultimately settle for 10th place, which was still the club's best finish in the League to date.

Inevitably, with a much improved side, the Torquay players began attracting attention from other clubs. At the end of the season both Jack Tennant and Alf Gray were sold to First Division side Liverpool, while Ted Anderson was also lured away to Second Division West Ham United. Perhaps most heartbreaking of all to the Plainmoor faithful was the departure of Dartmouth born right winger Ralph Birkett. After 98 appearances and 20 goals for Torquay, the 20-year-old Birkett was sold to eventual First Division champions Arsenal, with manager Herbert Chapman willing to pay the significant amount of £1,588 to secure his services. After later joining Middlesbrough, Birkett would go on to play for England in 1935.

Though losing key players was detrimental to the club, there was hope for the future with the arrival of Don Welsh. The centre half would soon develop and give a reason for Frank Brown to confident for the coming season.

== League statistics ==
=== Third Division South ===
Pos	Team	Pld	W	D	L	GF	GA	GAv	Pts
8	Northampton Town	42	18	8	16	76	66	1.152	44
9	Bristol Rovers	42	15	14	13	61	56	1.089	44
10	Torquay United	42	16	12	14	72	67	1.075	44
11	Watford	42	16	12	14	66	63	1.048	44
12	Brighton & Hove Albion	42	17	8	17	66	65	1.015	42

==== Results summary ====
Overall								Home						Away					
Pld	W	D	L	GF	GA	GAv	Pts	W	D	L	GF	GA	Pts	W	D	L	GF	GA	Pts
42	16	12	14	72	67	1.075	44	12	7	2	51	26	31	4	5	12	21	41	13

Source: rsssf.com

==== Results by round ====
Round	1	2	3	4	5	6	7	8	9	10	11	12	13	14	15	16	17	18	19	20	21	22	23	24	25	26	27	28	29	30	31	32	33	34	35	36	37	38	39	40	41	42
Ground	H	A	A	H	H	H	A	H	A	H	A	H	A	H	A	A	A	H	A	H	A	H	H	A	A	H	A	H	A	H	A	H	A	H	A	H	H	A	A	H	H	A
Result	D	L	L	D	W	L	L	W	W	W	L	L	D	W	L	D	L	W	W	D	L	D	D	L	L	W	L	W	D	W	D	W	L	D	W	W	W	L	W	D	W	D
Position	11	18	20	20	15	20	21	18	13	9	13	15	16	15	16	16	18	16	12	12	15	16	14	16	17	16	17	15	15	13	12	11	12	13	13	13	13	13	10	10	8	10

Source: statto.com
A = Away; H = Home; W = Win; D = Draw; L = Loss

== Results ==
=== Third Division South ===
27 Aug 1932	Torquay United	3–3	Coventry City	Plainmoor
	Davis; Fowler (pen.); Orr		Goal	Attendance: 5,740

31 Aug 1932	Bristol City	2–0	Torquay United	Ashton Gate
	Goal			Attendance: 8,762

3 Sep 1932	Brentford	3–1	Torquay United	Griffin Park
	Goal		Stabb	Attendance: 12,567

7 Sep 1932	Torquay United	0–0	Bristol City	Plainmoor
				Attendance: 4,695

10 Sep 1932	Torquay United	8–1	Southend United	Plainmoor
	Orr; Stabb; Hutchinson; Bird		Goal	Attendance: 4,488

17 Sep 1932	Torquay United	1–3	Exeter City	Plainmoor
	Orr		Goal	Attendance: 7,683

24 Sep 1932	Luton Town	2–1	Torquay United	Kenilworth Road
	Goal		Stabb	Attendance: 8,424

1 Oct 1932	Torquay United	4–0	Newport County	Plainmoor
	Birkett; Stabb; Bird			Attendance: 3,960

8 Oct 1932	Bournemouth & Boscombe Athletic	1–2	Torquay United	Dean Court
	Goal		Bird; Birkett	Attendance: 6,124

15 Oct 1932	Torquay United	4–3	Swindon Town	Plainmoor
	Hutchinson; Stabb		Goal	Attendance: 4,273

22 Oct 1932	Crystal Palace	2–1	Torquay United	Selhurst Park
	Goal		Hutchinson	Attendance: 10,031

29 Oct 1932	Torquay United	1–2	Gillingham	Plainmoor
	Hutchinson		Goal	Attendance: 3,118

5 Nov 1932	Watford	0–0	Torquay United	Vicarage Road
				Attendance: 7,910

12 Nov 1932	Torquay United	4–1	Cardiff City	Plainmoor
	Bird; Flavell; Birkett		Cribb	Attendance: 3,911

19 Nov 1932	Reading	5–2	Torquay United	Elm Park
	Goal		Bird	Attendance: 7,395

3 Dec 1932	Brighton & Hove Albion	1–1	Torquay United	Goldstone Ground
	Goal		Marsden (o.g.)	Attendance: 5,417

17 Dec 1932	Aldershot	2–0	Torquay United	Recreation Ground
	Goal			Attendance: 4,132

24 Dec 1932	Torquay United	3–1	Queens Park Rangers	Plainmoor
	Stabb; Bird		Goal	Attendance: 2,825

26 Dec 1932	Clapton Orient	1–4	Torquay United	Lea Bridge Stadium
	Goal		Flavell; Stabb; Bird	Attendance: 5,549

27 Dec 1932	Torquay United	1–1	Clapton Orient	Plainmoor
	Stabb		Goal	Attendance: 4,873

31 Dec 1932	Coventry City	5–0	Torquay United	Highfield Road
	Goal			Attendance: 12,143

7 Jan 1933	Torquay United	1–1	Brentford	Plainmoor
	Orr		Goal	Attendance: 4,882

14 Jan 1933	Torquay United	2–2	Norwich City	Plainmoor
	Stabb; Bird		Goal	Attendance: 4,396

21 Jan 1933	Southend United	2–1	Torquay United	The Kursaal
	Goal		Birkett	Attendance: 5,570

28 Jan 1933	Exeter City	5–0	Torquay United	St James Park
	Goal			Attendance: 9,591

4 Feb 1933	Torquay United	3–1	Luton Town	Plainmoor
	Kingham (o.g.); Hutchinson; Stabb		Goal	Attendance: 2,745

11 Feb 1933	Newport County	3–1	Torquay United	Somerton Park
	Gardner; Thomas		Mills	Attendance: 3,098

18 Feb 1933	Torquay United	2–1	Bournemouth & Boscombe Athletic	Plainmoor
	Hutchinson; Orr		Goal	Attendance: 2,904

25 Feb 1933	Swindon Town	0–0	Torquay United	County Ground
				Attendance: 1,528

4 Mar 1933	Torquay United	2–1	Crystal Palace	Plainmoor
	Birkett; Hutchinson		Goal	Attendance: 3,467

11 Mar 1933	Gillingham	1–1	Torquay United	Priestfield
	Goal		Hutchinson	Attendance: 5,786

18 Mar 1933	Torquay United	3–2	Watford	Plainmoor
	Stabb		Goal	Attendance: 3,241

25 Mar 1933	Cardiff City	2–1	Torquay United	Ninian Park
	Henderson		Hutchinson	Attendance: 6,630

1 Apr 1933	Torquay United	1–1	Reading	Plainmoor
	Hutchinson		Goal	Attendance: 3,649

8 Apr 1933	Norwich City	1–2	Torquay United	The Nest
	Goal		Hutchinson	Attendance: 11,464

15 Apr 1933	Torquay United	1–0	Brighton & Hove Albion	Plainmoor
	Stabb			Attendance: 3,937

17 Apr 1933	Torquay United	5–1	Northampton Town	Plainmoor
	Birkett; Welsh; Stabb; Orr		Goal	Attendance: 3,553

18 Apr 1933	Northampton Town	2–0	Torquay United	County Ground
	Goal			Attendance: 4,049

22 Apr 1933	Bristol Rovers	0–2	Torquay United	Eastville Stadium
			Gray; Stabb	Attendance: 5,606

26 Apr 1933	Torquay United	1–1	Bristol Rovers	Plainmoor
	Stabb		Goal	Attendance: 2,462

29 Apr 1933	Torquay United	1–0	Aldershot	Plainmoor
	Anderson			Attendance: 3,000

6 May 1933	Queens Park Rangers	1–1	Torquay United	White City Stadium
	Goal		Stabb	Attendance: 3,079

=== FA Cup ===
26 Nov 1932 First round	Torquay United	0–0	Bournemouth & Boscombe Athletic	Plainmoor
				Attendance: 6,000

30 Nov 1932 First round replay	Bournemouth & Boscombe Athletic	2–2	Torquay United	Dean Court
	Goal		Bird; Tennant (pen.)

5 Dec 1932 First round 2nd replay	Torquay United	3–2	Bournemouth & Boscombe Athletic	Ashton Gate
	Stabb; Birkett; Hutchinson		Goal	Attendance: 2,000

10 Dec 1932 Second round	Torquay United	1–1	Queens Park Rangers	Plainmoor
	Hutchinson		Goal	Attendance: 5,000; Referee: Stanley Rous

15 Dec 1932 Second round replay	Queens Park Rangers	3–1	Torquay United	White City Stadium
	Goal		Stabb	Attendance: 7,100

== Club statistics ==
=== First team appearances ===
Nat	Pos	Player	Total		Third Division South		FA Cup
Nat	Pos	Player	Apps	Goals	Apps	Goals	Apps	Goals
(England)	GK	Percy Maggs	47	0	42	0	5	0
(England)	DF	Jack Tennant	47	1	42	0	5	1
(England)	DF	Lew Tapp	40	0	35	0	5	0
(England)	DF	Jack Fowler	7	1	7	1	0	0
(England)	DF	Wally Webster	5	0	4	0	1	0
(England)	MF	Ted Anderson	47	1	42	1	5	0
(England)	MF	Tom Robinson	29	0	24	0	5	0
(England)	MF	Alf Gray	22	1	22	1	0	0
(England)	MF	Fred Martin	16	0	11	0	5	0
(England)	MF	Don Welsh	16	0	16	0	0	0
(England)	MF	Don Hewitt	11	0	11	0	0	0
(England)	FW	Don Bird	45	10	40	9	5	1
(England)	FW	Albert Orr	45	6	41	6	4	0
(England)	FW	George Stabb	45	26	40	24	5	2
(England)	FW	Albert Hutchinson	38	17	34	15	4	2
(England)	FW	Ralph Birkett	35	9	32	8	3	1
(England)	FW	Fred Flavell	10	3	9	3	1	0
(England)	FW	Fred Avey	4	0	3	0	1	0
(Republic of Ireland)	FW	Tommy Davis	4	1	4	1	0	0
(England)	FW	Leslie Mills	2	1	2	1	0	0
(Wales)	FW	Maldwyn Owens	2	0	1	0	1	0

=== Top scorers ===
Place	Position	Nation	Name	Third Division South	FA Cup	Total
1	FW	(England)	George Stabb	24	2	26
2	FW	(England)	Albert Hutchinson	15	2	17
3	FW	(England)	Don Bird	9	1	10
4	FW	(England)	Ralph Birkett	8	1	9
5	FW	(England)	Albert Orr	6	0	6
6	FW	(England)	Fred Flavell	3	0	3
7	MF	(England)	Ted Anderson	1	0	1
=	FW	(Republic of Ireland)	Tom Davis	1	0	1
=	DF	(England)	Jack Fowler	1	0	1
=	MF	(England)	Alf Gray	1	0	1
=	MF	(England)	Leslie Mills	1	0	1
=	DF	(England)	Jack Tennant	0	1	1
			Own goals	2	0	2
			TOTAL	72	7	79

=== Transfers ===
==== In ====
First appearance	Nat.	Pos.	Name	From
27 August 1932	(England)	FW	Fred Avey	Fulham
27 August 1932	(England)	FW	Don Bird	Bury
27 August 1932	(Republic of Ireland)	FW	Tommy Davis	Boston Town
27 August 1932	(England)	MF	Alf Gray	Oldham Athletic
27 August 1932	(England)	GK	Percy Maggs	Blackpool
27 August 1932	(England)	MF	Fred Martin	Millwall
27 August 1932	(England)	FW	Albert Orr	Chesterfield
27 August 1932	(England)	DF	Jack Tennant	Stoke City
31 August 1932	(England)	MF	Tom Robinson	Bury
5 November 1932	(England)	FW	Fred Flavell	Oldham Athletic
15 December 1932	(Wales)	FW	Maldwyn Owens	Unattached
4 February 1933	(England)	FW	Leslie Mills	Unattached
4 February 1933	(England)	MF	Don Welsh	R.N. Devonport

==== Out ====
Last appearance	Nat.	Pos.	Name	To
17 December 1932	(Wales)	FW	Maldwyn Owens	Released
28 January 1933	(England)	MF	Fred Martin	Released
11 February 1933	(England)	MF	Tom Robinson	Retired
18 April 1933	(England)	FW	Ralph Birkett	Arsenal
22 April 1933	(England)	FW	Fred Avey	Tunbridge Wells
6 May 1933	(England)	MF	Ted Anderson	West Ham United
6 May 1933	(Republic of Ireland)	FW	Tommy Davis	New Brighton
6 May 1933	(England)	MF	Alf Gray	Liverpool
6 May 1933	(England)	DF	Jack Tennant	Liverpool
6 May 1933	(England)	DF	Wally Webster	Rochdale
