= 1929–30 Torquay United F.C. season =

Torquay United
1929–30 season
- Chairman: Charles Dear
- Manager: Frank Womack
- Third Division South: 19th
- FA Cup: First Round
- Top goalscorer: League: Joe Pointon (18); All: Joe Pointon (18)
- Highest home attendance: 8,299 v Plymouth Argyle, 4 September 1929 (Third Division South)
- Lowest home attendance: 2,730 v Watford, 28 December 1929 (Third Division South)
- Average home league attendance: 4,271
Home colours

The 1929–30 Torquay United F.C. season was Torquay United's third season in the Football League and their third consecutive season in Third Division South. The season runs from 1 July 1929 to 30 June 1930.

== Overview ==
Needing a replacement for Percy Mackrill, who had left the club before the end of the previous season, Torquay United appointed former Birmingham City full back Frank Womack as their new manager. Womack soon set about putting a together a new squad in an effort to improve upon the lowly finishes of Torquay's first two seasons in the League. Debutants on the opening day of the season included centre half Harry Bruce, inside forward Harry Keeling and the ex-Sheffield United FA Cup winner David Mercer. However, the Magpies made a slow start to the campaign, losing their opening four games, and it was not until the introduction of forwards Joe Pointon and Les Robinson that results slowly began to improve. Effectively displacing Keeling and United mainstay Dan Kelly from the team, Pointon and Robinson ended up scoring a total of 34 goals between them by the end of the season. Robinson became the first Torquay player to score four goals in a League match in the 5–2 win over Walsall in November and, not to be outdone, Pointon repeated the feat in a famous 7–0 victory over Bournemouth & Boscombe Athletic the following March. Indeed, it was Pointon and Robinson who scored the goals at Gillingham to secure Torquay's first and only away win of the season.

However, United's fortunes took a turn for the worse in the New Year when a January storm tore off the entire roof of the Grandstand at Plainmoor. With Torquay's finances already in a perilous state, there was a real possibility of the club going out of business altogether. But, with the help of public donations and some hastily arranged friendlies, Torquay just about managed to avoid financial ruin, although a run of three consecutive 5–0 defeats to Clapton Orient, Brentford and Brighton did not help to improve the spirits of the team or its supporters.

Nevertheless, reason for optimism arrived with that emphatic 7–0 win over Bournemouth at Plainmoor. The match marked the debut of a 17-year-old winger from Dartmouth named Ralph Birkett. Although only making a handful of appearances for the Magpies before the end of the season, he would eventually become one of the finest players ever to appear for Torquay United. Ironically, the match also saw the final appearance of another local hero Sid Cann. The Torquay born full back had put in some impressive performances since joining United and the club had no option but to accept an offer to sell the young defender, as well as fellow full back Fred Corbett, to First Division side Manchester City.

Despite the emphatic win over Bournemouth, Torquay were still struggling at the bottom of the table as the season drew to a close. Defeat in the final game of the season against local rivals Exeter City would have seen United again having to apply for re-election to the Football League. As it was, a 2–1 victory over the Grecians was enough to see Torquay finish in 19th place, only narrowly avoiding the need for re-election.

Although, safe for another season, it was clear that Frank Womack and Torquay United still had plenty of hard work ahead of them.

== League statistics ==
=== Third Division South ===
Pos	Team	Pld	W	D	L	GF	GA	GAv	Pts	Promotion or relegation
17	Walsall	42	13	8	21	71	78	0.910	34	
18	Newport County	42	12	10	20	74	85	0.871	34	
19	Torquay United	42	10	11	21	64	94	0.681	31	
20	Bristol Rovers	42	11	8	23	67	93	0.720	30	
21	Gillingham	42	11	8	23	51	80	0.638	30	Re-elected

==== Results summary ====
Overall								Home						Away					
Pld	W	D	L	GF	GA	GAv	Pts	W	D	L	GF	GA	Pts	W	D	L	GF	GA	Pts
42	10	11	21	64	94	0.681	31	9	6	6	50	38	24	1	5	15	14	56	7

Source: rsssf.com

==== Results by round ====
Round	1	2	3	4	5	6	7	8	9	10	11	12	13	14	15	16	17	18	19	20	21	22	23	24	25	26	27	28	29	30	31	32	33	34	35	36	37	38	39	40	41	42
Ground	A	H	H	A	A	A	H	A	H	A	A	H	A	H	A	H	H	A	H	A	H	H	A	A	H	A	A	H	H	A	H	H	A	H	H	A	A	H	H	A	A	H
Result	L	L	L	L	D	D	W	L	W	L	D	D	L	W	D	L	D	W	L	L	W	W	L	L	L	L	L	D	D	L	W	L	L	W	D	L	L	D	W	L	D	W
Position	18	19	22	22	22	22	21	21	16	19	19	17	18	17	16	17	16	16	16	19	16	15	15	15	18	18	19	19	19	19	19	19	19	19	19	19	19	20	19	19	19	19

Source: statto.com
A = Away; H = Home; W = Win; D = Draw; L = Loss

== Match of the season ==
TORQUAY UNITED 7–0 BOURNEMOUTH & BOSCOMBE ATHLETIC
Third Division South
Plainmoor, 8 March 1930

TORQUAY UNITED	BOURNEMOUTH

TORQUAY UNITED:
GK	1	(England) Archie Bayes
RB	2	(England) Frank Womack
LB	3	(England) Jack Fowler
RH	4	(England) Stan High
CH	5	(England) Sid Cann
LH	6	(England) Bob Smith
OR	7	(England) Ralph Birkett
IR	8	(Scotland) Dan Kelly
CF	9	(England) Joe Pointon
IL	10	(England) Harry Keeling
OL	11	(England) Harry Waller

Having not won a match since the previous December, few would have expected Torquay United (currently lying 19th in the Third Division South table) to get much out of the visit of 6th placed Bournemouth & Boscombe Athletic. The Plainmoor faithful had already witnessed a 5–0 thrashing from Clapton Orient back in January, and the travelling fans were treated to two more defeats by the same scoreline in their next two away matches. Not many then would have been expecting the Magpies to record their biggest League victory to date when the Cherries came to town.

Helping himself to four of the seven goals that day was centre forward Joe Pointon, doubling his tally for the season so far, although he would go on to score another ten goals before the end of the campaign. Dan Kelly and Harry Waller scored the other three between them while the Torquay defence held firm behind them, despite the 41-year-old Frank Womack selecting himself at right back. (In fact, this was manager Womack's sixth match in succession and he ended up playing in every game for the rest of the season, even appearing as an inside forward when Torquay were themselves victims of a 7–0 humiliation at Walsall in April).

The match also has a unique place in history as it was the only time that two of Torquay's greatest ever home-grown players appeared together. Born in Babbacombe, Sid Cann had joined the Magpies the previous season at the age of 16 and quickly developed into an extremely effective full back, eventually displacing the more experienced Willie Brown from the team. In his second season, he had proved his versatility by being able to fill in at centre half, a role he fulfilled in this game. Unfortunately, this was to be Cann's last match for the Magpies before leaving for Manchester City. Ironically, the same game saw the debut of another local lad with Ralph Birkett, a 17-year-old amateur from Dartmouth United, appearing on the right wing. Birkett had a storming debut for Torquay setting up four of United's goals and the youngster signed a professional contract with the club shortly afterwards. While Cann's move to a First Division side was a major accomplishment for a Torquay player, Birkett would go on to eclipse his achievements when, after three full seasons for United, he would sign for Arsenal and then Middlesbrough before eventually appearing for England in 1935.

== Results ==
=== Third Division South ===
31 Aug 1929	Watford	2–0	Torquay United	Vicarage Road
	Goal			Attendance: 11,558

4 Sep 1929	Torquay United	3–4	Plymouth Argyle	Plainmoor
	Hill; Keeling		Craig (pen.); Matthews; Bowden; Leslie	Attendance: 8,299

7 Sep 1929	Torquay United	1–3	Coventry City	Plainmoor
	Hill		Goal	Attendance: 5,250

11 Sep 1929	Plymouth Argyle	5–0	Torquay United	Home Park
	Leslie; McKenzie; Sloan; Black			Attendance: 9,827

14 Sep 1929	Clapton Orient	1–1	Torquay United	Millfields Road
	Goal		Pointon	Attendance: 12,561

18 Sep 1929	Exeter City	0–0	Torquay United	St James Park
				Attendance: 5,745

21 Sep 1929	Torquay United	2–1	Brentford	Plainmoor
	Robinson		Goal	Attendance: 5,012

28 Sep 1929	Bristol Rovers	2–0	Torquay United	Eastville Stadium
	Goal			Attendance: 6,581

5 Oct 1929	Torquay United	5–2	Brighton & Hove Albion	Plainmoor
	Cann (pen.) (pen.); Pointon; Robinson		Goal	Attendance: 3,934

12 Oct 1929	Swindon Town	2–1	Torquay United	County Ground
	Goal		Robinson	Attendance: 6,058

19 Oct 1929	Southend United	1–1	Torquay United	The Kursaal
	Goal		Robinson	Attendance: 8,269

26 Oct 1929	Torquay United	2–2	Luton Town	Plainmoor
	Hill; Keeling		Goal	Attendance: 4,755

2 Nov 1929	Bournemouth & Boscombe Athletic	4–1	Torquay United	Dean Court
	Goal		Smith (pen.)	Attendance: 6,770

9 Nov 1929	Torquay United	5–2	Walsall	Plainmoor
	Robinson; Hill		Goal	Attendance: 4,463

16 Nov 1929	Queens Park Rangers	1–1	Torquay United	Loftus Road
	Goal		Waller	Attendance: 2,360

23 Nov 1929	Torquay United	2–4	Fulham	Plainmoor
	Cann (pen.); Robinson		Goal	Attendance: 4,380

7 Dec 1929	Torquay United	2–2	Crystal Palace	Plainmoor
	Hill		Goal	Attendance: 3,400

14 Dec 1929	Gillingham	0–2	Torquay United	Priestfield
			Robinson; Pointon	Attendance: 3,310

21 Dec 1929	Torquay United	0–1	Northampton Town	Plainmoor
			Goal	Attendance: 3,730

25 Dec 1929	Newport County	2–1	Torquay United	Somerton Park
	Morris; Thomas		Corbett	Attendance: 3,337

26 Dec 1929	Torquay United	3–2	Newport County	Plainmoor
	Kelly; Robinson		Martin; Seymour	Attendance: 5,928

28 Dec 1929	Torquay United	4–0	Watford	Plainmoor
	Robinson; Kelly; Hill			Attendance: 2,730

4 Jan 1930	Coventry City	4–1	Torquay United	Highfield Road
	Goal		Hill	Attendance: 12,782

11 Jan 1930	Norwich City	2–0	Torquay United	The Nest
	Goal			Attendance: 8,864

18 Jan 1930	Torquay United	0–5	Clapton Orient	Plainmoor
			Goal	Attendance: 4,132

25 Jan 1930	Brentford	5–0	Torquay United	Griffin Park
	Goal			Attendance: 10,497

8 Feb 1930	Brighton & Hove Albion	5–0	Torquay United	Goldstone Ground
	Goal			Attendance: 9,964

15 Feb 1930	Torquay United	1–1	Swindon Town	Plainmoor
	Keeling		Goal	Attendance: 3,473

22 Feb 1930	Torquay United	1–1	Southend United	Plainmoor
	Robinson		Goal	Attendance: 3,429

1 Mar 1930	Luton Town	3–1	Torquay United	Kenilworth Road
	Goal		Hill	Attendance: 7,239

8 Mar 1930	Torquay United	7–0	Bournemouth & Boscombe Athletic	Plainmoor
	Pointon; Waller; Kelly			Attendance: 3,443

22 Mar 1930	Torquay United	1–3	Queens Park Rangers	Plainmoor
	Hill		Goal	Attendance: 4,335

29 Mar 1930	Fulham	1–0	Torquay United	Craven Cottage
	Goal			Attendance: 11,038

2 Apr 1930	Torquay United	2–1	Bristol Rovers	Plainmoor
	Pointon		Goal	Attendance: 3,267

5 Apr 1930	Torquay United	2–2	Norwich City	Plainmoor
	Kelly; Pointon		Goal	Attendance: 3,921

9 Apr 1930	Walsall	7–0	Torquay United	Fellows Park
	Goal			Attendance: 2,492

12 Apr 1930	Crystal Palace	4–2	Torquay United	Selhurst Park
	Goal		Keeling; Pointon	Attendance: 9,555

19 Apr 1930	Torquay United	1–1	Gillingham	Plainmoor
	Keeling		Goal	Attendance: 3,472

21 Apr 1930	Torquay United	4–0	Merthyr Town	Plainmoor
	Hill; Pointon			Attendance: 3,337

22 Apr 1930	Merthyr Town	3–0	Torquay United	Penydarren Park
	Goal			Attendance: 1,612

26 Apr 1930	Northampton Town	2–2	Torquay United	County Ground
	Goal		Pointon; Keeling	Attendance: 4,100

3 May 1930	Torquay United	2–1	Exeter City	Plainmoor
	Pointon		Goal	Attendance: 4,993

=== FA Cup ===
30 Nov 1929 First Round	Bournemouth & Boscombe Athletic	2–0	Torquay United	Dean Court
	Goal

== Club statistics ==
=== First team appearances ===
Nat	Pos	Player	Total		Third Division South		FA Cup
Nat	Pos	Player	Apps	Goals	Apps	Goals	Apps	Goals
(England)	GK	Archie Bayes	18	0	18	0	0	0
(England)	GK	Harold Gough	18	0	17	0	1	0
(England)	GK	Laurie Millsom	7	0	7	0	0	0
(England)	DF	Jack Fowler	29	0	28	0	1	0
(England)	DF	Sid Cann	28	3	27	3	1	0
(England)	DF	Fred Corbett	22	1	21	1	1	0
(England)	DF	Frank Womack	20	0	19	0	1	0
(England)	DF	George Goucher	6	0	6	0	0	0
(England)	MF	Bob Smith	41	1	41	1	0	0
(England)	MF	Harry Bruce	29	0	28	0	1	0
(England)	MF	Stan High	28	0	28	0	0	0
(Scotland)	MF	Bill Hunter	6	0	6	0	0	0
(England)	MF	Cecil White	5	0	5	0	0	0
(England)	MF	Bill Clitheroe	1	0	1	0	0	0
(England)	MF	Harry May	1	0	1	0	0	0
(England)	FW	Joe Hill	33	8	32	8	1	0
(England)	FW	Harry Waller	30	5	29	5	1	0
(England)	FW	David Mercer	29	0	28	0	1	0
(England)	FW	Joe Pointon	28	18	27	18	1	0
(England)	FW	Les Robinson	24	16	23	16	1	0
(England)	FW	Harry Keeling	22	7	22	7	0	0
(Scotland)	FW	Dan Kelly	19	5	19	5	0	0
(Scotland)	FW	Andrew Martin	13	0	13	0	0	0
(England)	FW	Jack Burn	7	0	7	0	0	0
(England)	FW	Ralph Birkett	6	0	6	0	0	0
(England)	FW	Harry Rice	3	0	3	0	0	0

=== Top scorers ===
Place	Position	Nation	Name	Third Division South	FA Cup	Total
1	FW	(England)	Joe Pointon	18	0	18
2	FW	(England)	Les Robinson	16	0	16
3	FW	(England)	Joe Hill	8	0	8
4	FW	(England)	Harry Keeling	7	0	7
5	FW	(Scotland)	Dan Kelly	5	0	5
=	FW	(England)	Harry Waller	5	0	5
7	DF	(England)	Sid Cann	3	0	3
8	DF	(England)	Fred Corbett	1	0	1
9	MF	(England)	Bob Smith	1	0	1
			Own goals	0	0	0
			TOTAL	64	0	64

=== Transfers ===
==== In ====
First appearance	Nat.	Pos.	Name	From
31 August 1929	(England)	MF	Harry Bruce	Gillingham
31 August 1929	(England)	MF	Stan High	Leicester City
31 August 1929	(England)	FW	Harry Keeling	Notts County
31 August 1929	(Scotland)	FW	Andrew Martin	Rochdale
31 August 1929	(England)	FW	David Mercer	Shirebrook
4 September 1929	(England)	FW	Jack Burn	Worcester City
4 September 1929	(England)	FW	Harry Rice	Shrewsbury Town
4 September 1929	(England)	DF	Frank Womack	Worcester City
7 September 1929	(England)	MF	Harry May	Unattached
11 September 1929	(England)	FW	Joe Pointon	Brighton & Hove Albion
11 September 1929	(England)	FW	Les Robinson	Thames
18 September 1929	(England)	DF	Fred Corbett	Worcester City
19 October 1929	(England)	DF	George Goucher	Nottingham Forest
26 December 1929	(Scotland)	MF	Bill Hunter	Walsall
8 March 1930	(England)	FW	Ralph Birkett	Dartmouth United
29 March 1930	(England)	MF	Cecil White	Leeds United

==== Out ====
Last appearance	Nat.	Pos.	Name	To
7 September 1929	(England)	MF	Harry May	Released
11 September 1929	(England)	FW	Harry Rice	Evesham Town
9 November 1929	(Scotland)	FW	Andrew Martin	Released
7 December 1929	(England)	FW	Jack Burn	Hereford United
18 January 1930	(Scotland)	MF	Bill Hunter	Released
25 January 1930	(England)	DF	Fred Corbett	Manchester City
15 February 1930	(England)	MF	Bill Clitheroe	Released
1 March 1930	(England)	FW	Les Robinson	Released
8 March 1930	(England)	DF	Sid Cann	Manchester City
29 March 1930	(England)	GK	Harold Gough	Retired
19 April 1930	(Scotland)	FW	Dan Kelly	York City
19 April 1930	(England)	MF	Cecil White	Wigan Borough
3 May 1930	(England)	GK	Archie Bayes	Retired
3 May 1930	(England)	MF	Harry Bruce	Colwyn Bay
3 May 1930	(England)	DF	George Goucher	Shirebrook
3 May 1930	(England)	FW	Joe Hill	Newark Town
3 May 1930	(England)	FW	David Mercer	Released
3 May 1930	(England)	FW	Joe Pointon	Bristol Rovers
