= George Hopkins =

George Hopkins may refer to:

- George Hopkins (baseball) (1858–?), pre-Negro leagues baseball pitcher and second baseman
- George Hopkins (comedian) (1928–2011), American comedian and musician
- George Hopkins (footballer) (1901–1974), English footballer
- George Hopkins (parachutist), professional parachutist who parachuted without permission onto Devils Tower in 1941 and got stuck there for six days
- George James Hopkins (1896–1985), set designer, playwright and production designer
- George Feltham Hopkins (1856–1897), politician in South Australia
- George H. Hopkins (1842–?), Michigan politician
- George Henry Evans Hopkins (1898–1973), English entomologist
- George Washington Hopkins (1804–1861), Virginia politician, diplomat, lawyer, judge and teacher
- George W. Hopkins (1844–1925), Florida industrialist
