= Joe Duckworth =

Joe Duckworth is the name of:

- Joe Duckworth (footballer) (1898–?), English professional football goalkeeper
- Joseph Duckworth (1902–1964), USAF pilot, first man to fly into a hurricane
- Joe Duckworth (American football) (1921–2007), American football player
