= Fred McKenzie =

Fred McKenzie may refer to:

- Fred McKenzie (footballer) (1903–1979), Scottish footballer
- Fred McKenzie (politician) (1933–2008), Australian politician
- Fred McKenzie (weightlifter), bronze medalist in weightlifting at the 1984 Summer Paralympics
