= Newmarket Road =

Newmarket Road may be:

- Newmarket Road (football ground), former ground of Norwich City F.C.
- Newmarket Road, Cambridge, England
