= David Mercer (footballer, born 1893) =

English footballer (1893–1950)

Personal information
- Full name: David William Mercer
- Date of birth: 20 March 1893
- Place of birth: St Helens, England
- Date of death: 1 June 1950 (aged 57)
- Place of death: Newton Abbot, England
- Height: 5 ft 7 1/2 in (1.71 m)
- Position: Outside right

Senior career*
Years	Team	Apps	(Gls)
–1911	Prescot Athletic		
1911–1913	St Helens Town		
1913–1914	Skelmersdale United		
1914–1920	Hull City	91	(26)
1920–1928	Sheffield United	223	(22)
1928	Prescot Cables		
1928–1929	Shirebrook		
1929–1930	Torquay United	28	(0)
1930	Dartmouth United		
Total		342	(48)

International career
1922–1923	England	2	(1)
1924	Football League XI	1	(0)
- * Club domestic league appearances and goals

David William Mercer (20 March 1893 – 1 June 1950) was an English professional footballer who made over 220 appearances in the Football League for Sheffield United as an outside right. He also played league football for Hull City and Torquay United and won two caps for England.

== Club career ==
After beginning his career in non-League football with Prescot Athletic, St Helens Town and Skelmersdale United, Mercer joined Second Division club Hull City for a £40 fee on 22 January 1914. He made 91 league appearances and scored 26 goals for the club before moving to First Division Sheffield United on 13 December 1920, for a British record transfer fee of £4,500. He made 241 appearances and scored 22 goals for the Bramall Lane club and won the 1924–25 FA Cup, before leaving in 1928. Aside from a spell with Torquay United during the 1929–30 season, Mercer played the remainder of his career in non-League football.

== International and representative career ==
Mercer represented the Football League XI and won two caps for England, scoring once, in a 6–1 victory over Belgium on 19 March 1923.

== Personal life ==
Mercer was the older brother of fellow footballer Arthur Mercer and the pair briefly played together at Sheffield United, while his other brother Richard was an amateur footballer. David's son, also named David, also became a professional footballer. In 1911, Mercer was working in a coal mine and in 1939 he was working as a golf club groundsman.

== Career statistics ==
Appearances and goals by club, season and competition
Club	Season	League			FA Cup		Total	
Club	Season	Division	Apps	Goals	Apps	Goals	Apps	Goals
Hull City	1913–14	Second Division	2	0	0	0	2	0
Hull City	1914–15	Second Division	38	4	5	0	43	4
Hull City	1919–20	Second Division	41	17	1	0	42	17
Hull City	1920–21	Second Division	10	5	0	0	10	5
Hull City	Total		91	26	6	0	97	26
Torquay United	1929–30	Third Division South	28	0	1	0	29	0
Career total			119	26	7	0	126	26

== Honours ==
Sheffield United

- FA Cup: 1924–25
