= Wally Webster =

English footballer

Personal information
- Full name: Walter George Webster
- Date of birth: 22 May 1895
- Place of birth: West Bromwich, England
- Date of death: 15 September 1980 (aged 85)
- Height: 5 ft 9 1/2 in (1.77 m)
- Position: Full back

Senior career*
Years	Team	Apps	(Gls)
- Kingsbury Colliery
- West Bromwich United
1921–1924	Walsall	132	(3)
1925	Lincoln City	12	(0)
1925–1929	Sheffield United	35	(0)
- Worksop Town
- Scunthorpe & Lindsey United
	Mossley	5	(0)
1931–1933	Torquay United	28	(0)
1933	Rochdale	38	(0)
- Stalybridge Celtic
1934	Barrow	4	(0)
–1936	Workington		
- * Club domestic league appearances and goals

Walter George Webster (22 May 1895 – 15 September 1980) was an English professional footballer who played as a full back in the Football League, most notably for Walsall.

== Career statistics ==
Appearances and goals by club, season and competition
Club	Season	League			FA Cup		Total	
Club	Season	Division	Apps	Goals	Apps	Goals	Apps	Goals
Lincoln City	1925–26	Third Division North	12	0	0	0	12	0
Torquay United	1931–32	Third Division South	24	0	0	0	24	0
Torquay United	1932–33	Third Division South	4	0	1	0	5	0
Torquay United	Total		28	0	1	0	29	0
Career Total			40	0	1	0	41	0
