= Albert Hutchinson =

English footballer

Personal information
- Date of birth: 30 September 1910
- Place of birth: Sheffield, England
- Date of death: May 1974 (aged 63)
- Place of death: Sheffield, England
- Height: 5 ft 7 in (1.70 m)
- Position: Inside forward

Senior career*
Years	Team	Apps	(Gls)
- All Saints Old Boys
- Atlas & Norfolk Works
1929–1930	Luton Town	5	(1)
1930–1940	Torquay United	317	(80)
1945–1947	Buxton		
- * Club domestic league appearances and goals

Albert Edward Hutchinson (30 September 1910 – May 1974) was an English professional footballer. Born in Sheffield, he is notable for being one of Torquay United's all-time leading appearance makers.

== Career ==
Having scored an extraordinary 255 goals in three seasons for amateur Sheffield sides All Saints Old Boys and Atlas & Norfolk, Hutchinson was lured south to play for Third Division South side Luton Town in 1929. After impressing in the Luton Reserve side, he was elevated to the first team but only managed five senior appearances and one goal for the Hatters.

Hutchinson was then signed by Luton's Third Division South rivals Torquay United before the beginning of the 1930–31 season. Making his debut away to Newport County on 30 August 1930, he had to give up his favoured centre forward position to Jimmy Trotter. However, he immediately established himself as an inside forward and was an ever-present over the next two seasons. Hutchinson was eventually made United's captain and was the club's leading scorer for both the 1934–35 and 1935–36 seasons. He proved his versatility by playing at every position on the pitch during his Torquay career, even filling in for injured goalkeeper Percy Maggs during a home game against Brighton & Hove Albion where he managed to save a penalty. By the end of the 1938–39 season, Hutchinson had made a record 338 appearances for Torquay before his career was interrupted by the outbreak of World War II.

He continued to play for Torquay United during the 1939–40 Wartime League before joining Buxton of the Cheshire League for two seasons after the war.

Hutchinson eventually returned to Sheffield to work in the steel industry before his death from lung cancer in May 1974.

== Career statistics ==
Club	Season	League		FA Cup		Other		Total	
Club	Season	Apps	Goals	Apps	Goals	Apps	Goals	Apps	Goals
Luton Town	1929–30	5	1	0	0	0	0	5	1
Torquay United	1930–31	42	11	4	0	0	0	46	11
Torquay United	1931–32	42	10	1	0	0	0	43	10
Torquay United	1932–33	34	15	4	2	0	0	38	17
Torquay United	1933–34	32	7	0	0	3	1	35	8
Torquay United	1934–35	32	18	2	0	0	0	34	18
Torquay United	1935–36	28	10	1	0	0	0	29	10
Torquay United	1936–37	33	6	1	0	1	1	35	7
Torquay United	1937–38	36	1	0	0	0	0	36	1
Torquay United	1938–39	38	2	2	0	2	0	42	2
Torquay United	Total	317	80	15	2	6	2	338	84
Career total		322	81	15	2	6	2	343	85
