= George Stabb =

English footballer (1912–1994)

Personal information
- Full name: George Herbert Stabb
- Date of birth: 26 September 1912
- Place of birth: Paignton, England
- Date of death: 11 December 1994 (aged 82)
- Place of death: Bradford, England
- Height: 5 ft 7 in (1.70 m)
- Positions: Wing half; forward

Youth career
- Dartmouth United
- Paignton Town

Senior career*
Years	Team	Apps	(Gls)
1931–1934	Torquay United	93	(44)
1934–1935	Notts County	24	(5)
1935–1936	Port Vale	32	(9)
1936–1947	Bradford Park Avenue	94	(4)
Total		243	(62)
- * Club domestic league appearances and goals

George Herbert Stabb (26 September 1912 – 11 December 1994) was an English footballer who played for Torquay United, Notts County, Port Vale, and Bradford Park Avenue in the 1930s.

== Career ==
Stabb played for Dartmouth United and Paignton Town before joining Torquay United in September 1931. He scored three goals in 12 Third Division South games in 1931–32. He claimed his first goal in the Football League on 7 September in a 10–2 defeat to Fulham at Craven Cottage. He went on to score 26 goals in 45 appearances in the 1932–33 season to finish as the club's top-scorer. He scored a hat-trick in an 8–1 win over Southend United at Plainmoor on 10 September and bagged another hat-trick in a 3–2 victory over Watford on 18 March. He then went on to score 15 goals in 1933–34 as he finished as the "Gulls" top-scorer for a second successive season. He then moved on to Notts County. He spent the 1933–34 season at Meadow Lane, and scored five goals in 24 Second Division games.

He signed with Port Vale in July 1935. He enjoyed a great start to his career with the "Valiants", scoring one goal in each of the first four Second Division games of the 1935–36 season. However, he damaged a cartilage during a 5–1 defeat to Burnley at Turf Moor on 9 September. This injury required surgery. However, he regained his place in the team after recovering in November. In the FA Cup, he scored against First Division champions Sunderland at Roker Park and the Old Recreation Ground, as Vale drew 2–2 before recording a shock 2–0 victory. However, Vale slipped to relegation into the Third Division North. Stabb played twice at the start of the 1936–37 season, before transferring to Bradford Park Avenue, back in the Second Division, in September 1936.

== Career statistics ==
Appearances and goals by club, season and competition
Club	Season	League			FA Cup		Other		Total	
Club	Season	Division	Apps	Goals	Apps	Goals	Apps	Goals	Apps	Goals
Torquay United	1931–32	Third Division South	11	3	1	0	0	0	12	3
Torquay United	1932–33	Third Division South	40	24	5	2	0	0	45	26
Torquay United	1933–34	Third Division South	37	13	2	1	2	1	41	15
Torquay United	1934–35	Third Division South	5	4	0	0	0	0	5	4
Torquay United	Total		93	44	8	3	2	1	103	48
Notts County	1934–35	Second Division	24	5	1	0	0	0	25	5
Port Vale	1935–36	Second Division	30	9	3	2	0	0	33	11
Port Vale	1936–37	Third Division North	2	0	0	0	0	0	2	0
Port Vale	Total		32	9	3	2	0	0	35	11
Bradford Park Avenue	1936–37	Second Division	17	1	0	0	0	0	17	1
Bradford Park Avenue	1937–38	Second Division	40	0	4	1	0	0	44	1
Bradford Park Avenue	1938–39	Second Division	35	2	1	0	0	0	36	2
Bradford Park Avenue	1939–40		0	0	0	0	3	0	3	0
Bradford Park Avenue	1946–47	Second Division	2	1	0	0	0	0	2	1
Bradford Park Avenue	Total		94	4	5	1	3	0	102	5
Career total			243	62	17	6	5	1	265	69
