= Joe Wright (footballer, born 1907) =

English footballer

Personal information
- Full name: Joseph Wright
- Date of birth: 1907
- Place of birth: Gateshead, England
- Date of death: 20 November 1936 (aged 29)
- Place of death: Newton Abbot, England
- Height: 5 ft 10 in (1.78 m)
- Position: Goalkeeper

Senior career*
Years	Team	Apps	(Gls)
- Birtley
1929–1930	Leicester City	15	(0)
1930–1932	Torquay United	69	(0)
1932–1934	Brighton & Hove Albion	14	(0)
- * Club domestic league appearances and goals

Joseph Wright (1907 – 20 November 1936) was an English professional footballer who made nearly 100 Football League appearances playing as a goalkeeper for Leicester City, Torquay United and Brighton & Hove Albion.

== Life and career ==
Wright was born in Gateshead in 1907. He was playing North-Eastern League football for Birtley when signed by Leicester City in 1929. He played 15 First Division matches for Leicester as backup to Jim McLaren, the last of which was a 6–6 draw with Arsenal, before joining Torquay United in 1930 as a replacement for the retired Harold Gough and Archie Bayes. He missed just one match in the 1930–31 season and was an ever-present for the first 28 league fixtures of the following season, after which time Laurie Millsom took over as first choice. Wright joined Brighton & Hove Albion in 1932 as backup for Stan Webb, but his career was curtailed by ill-health and he retired in 1934 after 14 appearances in two seasons.

He returned to Torquay where he bought a hotel, but his health worsened and he died in Newton Abbot, Devon, in 1936 at the age of 29.
