= Arthur Mercer =

English football player

Personal information
- Full name: Arthur Stanley Mercer
- Date of birth: 28 December 1902
- Place of birth: St Helens, England
- Date of death: 2 October 1994 (aged 91)
- Height: 5 ft 7 in (1.70 m)
- Position: Inside right

Senior career*
Years	Team	Apps	(Gls)
1920–1921	Parr St Peters		
1921–1924	Wigan Borough	39	(16)
1925–1926	Bury	11	(3)
1926–1928	Sheffield United	35	(14)
1928–1929	Rhyl Athletic		
1929–1930	Connah's Quay & Shotton		
1930–1931	Bristol City	31	(8)
1931–1933	Chester	63	(18)
1933–1935	Halifax Town	39	(8)
1935–	Dartford		
–1937	Rhyl		
- * Club domestic league appearances and goals

Arthur Stanley Mercer (28 December 1902 – 2 October 1994) was an English professional footballer who played as an inside right in the Football League for Chester, Wigan Borough, Halifax Town, Sheffield United, Bristol City and Bury.

== Personal life ==
Mercer was the brother of fellow footballers David and Richard. His nephew David also became a professional footballer.
