= David Mercer (footballer, born 1918) =

English footballer

Personal information
- Full name: Arthur David Mercer
- Date of birth: 14 February 1918
- Place of birth: Kingston upon Hull, England
- Date of death: April 1986 (aged 68)
- Place of death: Newton Abbot, England
- Position: Outside left

Senior career*
Years	Team	Apps	(Gls)
1946–1949	Torquay United	66	(8)
- Dartmouth United
- * Club domestic league appearances and goals

Arthur David Mercer (14 February 1918 – April 1986) was an English professional footballer who played as an outside left in the Football League for Torquay United.

== Personal life ==
Mercer was the son of England international footballer David Mercer and the nephew of professional footballer Arthur and amateur Richard.
