= Joe Pointon =

English footballer

Personal information
- Full name: Joseph Pointon
- Date of birth: 1 February 1905
- Place of birth: Leek, Staffordshire, England
- Date of death: 1939 (aged 33–34)
- Place of death: Leek, Staffordshire, England
- Height: 5 ft 11 in (1.80 m)
- Position: Forward

Youth career
- Leek Wesleyans
- Leek National

Senior career*
Years	Team	Apps	(Gls)
- Congleton Town
1922–1923	Stoke	0	(0)
1923–1926	Port Vale	10	(0)
1926–1928	Luton Town	65	(12)
1928–1929	Brighton & Hove Albion	16	(5)
1929–1930	Torquay United	27	(18)
1930–1931	Bristol Rovers	9	(1)
1931–1932	Walsall	17	(4)
Total		144+	(40+)
- * Club domestic league appearances and goals

Joseph Pointon (1 February 1905 – 1939) was an English footballer who played as a forward.

== Career ==
Pointon played for non-League football for Leek Wesleyans, Leek National, and Congleton Town before signing with Stoke. He did not feature for the "Potters" however, and so crossed the Potteries divide to join Port Vale as an amateur in April 1923. He played six consecutive Second Division games during the 1923–24 season, filling in for the regular number 7 Jack Lowe. He played four games during the 1925–26 season, but was released upon its conclusion. He moved on to Luton Town, Brighton & Hove Albion, Torquay United, Bristol Rovers and Walsall. He was Torquay's top scorer during the 1929–30 Third Division South season, with 16 goals. He died in 1939, aged 33 or 34, in his native Leek.

== Career statistics ==
Appearances and goals by club, season and competition
Club	Season	League			FA Cup		Other		Total	
Club	Season	Division	Apps	Goals	Apps	Goals	Apps	Goals	Apps	Goals
Port Vale	1923–24	Second Division	6	0	0	0	0	0	6	0
Port Vale	1924–25	Second Division	0	0	0	0	0	0	0	0
Port Vale	1925–26	Second Division	4	0	0	0	0	0	4	0
Port Vale	Total		10	0	0	0	0	0	10	0
Luton Town	1926–27	Third Division South	33	4	3	1	0	0	36	5
Luton Town	1927–28	Third Division South	32	8	3	0	0	0	35	8
Luton Town	Total		65	12	6	1	0	0	71	13
Brighton & Hove Albion	1928–29	Third Division South	16	5	0	0	0	0	16	5
Torquay United	1929–30	Third Division South	27	18	1	0	0	0	28	18
Bristol Rovers	1930–31	Third Division South	9	1	2	0	0	0	11	1
Walsall	1931–32	Third Division South	17	4	0	0	1	1	18	5
Career total			144	40	9	1	1	1	154	42
