= Stan Webb (footballer, born 1906) =

English footballer

Personal information
- Full name: Sidney John Webb
- Date of birth: 6 January 1906
- Place of birth: Portslade-by-Sea, England
- Date of death: 13 December 1993
- Place of death: Australia
- Height: 5 ft 11 in (1.80 m)
- Position: Goalkeeper

Senior career*
Years	Team	Apps	(Gls)
- Portslade Gasworks
192?–1924	Hove		
1924–1935	Brighton & Hove Albion	205	(0)
1924–1925	→ Tunbridge Wells Rangers (loan)		
1935–1936	Tunbridge Wells Rangers		
1936–1939	Southwick		
- * Club domestic league appearances and goals

Sidney John Webb (6 January 1906 – 13 December 1993), commonly known as Stan Webb, was an English professional footballer who made more than 200 Football League appearances playing as a goalkeeper for Brighton & Hove Albion.

== Life and career ==
Webb was born in Portslade-by-Sea, Sussex, in 1906. He worked at the local gasworks, and played football for his works team and for Sussex County League team Hove before turning professional with Brighton & Hove Albion in 1924. He spent the next season with Tunbridge Wells Rangers of the Kent League, and made 24 first-team appearances for Albion in 1925–26. He then lost his place to the experienced Skilly Williams, but regained it in late 1928, and was undisputed first choice until the arrival of Joe Duckworth, with whom he enjoyed a rivalry for the position until Duckworth moved on in 1932. Webb made his 234th and final first-team appearance for Albion in 1934, returned to Tunbridge Wells Rangers – by then a Southern League team – in 1935, and finished his career at Southwick. After the war, he emigrated to Australia, where he died on 13 December 1993.
