= Fred Avey =

English footballer

Personal information
- Full name: Frederick George Avey
- Date of birth: 31 August 1909
- Place of birth: Poplar, London, England
- Date of death: 17 September 1999 (aged 90)
- Place of death: Hornchurch, England
- Position: Forward

Senior career*
| Years | Team | Apps | (Gls) |
| – | Leytonstone | | |
| 19??–1928 | Leyton | | |
| 1928–1932 | Fulham | 62 | (28) |
| 1932–1933 | Torquay United | 3 | (0) |
| 1933–1934 | Tunbridge Wells Rangers | | |
- * Club domestic league appearances and goals

Frederick Avey (31 August 1909 – 17 September 1999) was an English professional footballer who played as a forward in the late 1920s and early 1930s. He was born in Poplar, London.

== Career ==
Avey began his football career in London, playing initially for Leytonstone before moving to Leyton, where he played until 1928. In that year, he signed for Fulham, After leaving Fulham, he joined Torquay United for the 1932–1933 season, appearing in 3 matches without scoring. He then moved to Tunbridge Wells Rangers for the 1933–1934 season, where he concluded his known football career.
