= Bob Meacock =

English footballer

Personal information
- Full name: William Robert Meacock
- Date of birth: 26 July 1910
- Place of birth: Hoole, England
- Height: 5 ft 9 in (1.75 m)
- Position: Centre half

Senior career*
Years	Team	Apps	(Gls)
- Hoole & Newton
- Chester
1930–1931	Blackpool	0	(0)
1931–1933	Torquay United	4	(0)
1933–1935	Tranmere Rovers	57	(3)
1935–1938	Lincoln City	106	(0)
1938–1939	Birmingham	13	(0)
1939–19??	Bristol City	0	(0)
- * Club domestic league appearances and goals

William Robert Meacock (26 July 1910 – after 1946) was an English professional footballer who made 180 appearances in the Football League playing for Torquay United, Tranmere Rovers, Lincoln City and Birmingham. He played most frequently at centre half, but also appeared as a right half or inside right.

Meacock was born in Hoole, Cheshire. He played for local club Hoole & Newton, and was on the books of Chester and Blackpool, before joining Torquay United in 1931, where he made his debut in the Football League. He went on to play regular first-team football in the Third Division North for Tranmere Rovers, where he was part of the Tranmere side which reached the Welsh Cup final in 1934, and Lincoln City, for whom he made 116 appearances in all competitions. Meacock then moved to First Division club Birmingham as one of a number of players signed in 1938 to "boost the club's flagging fortunes". He played 14 games in all competitions, but left at the end of the 1938–39 season with the club relegated. He joined Bristol City, but the outbreak of the Second World War put an end to his professional career.

In 1946 Meacock was appointed as coach in the Netherlands at Racing Club Haarlem (RCH).
