= Newmarket Road (football ground) =

Former home ground of Norwich City F.C

- Interactive map of Newmarket Road
- Full name: Newmarket Road
- Location: Norwich, Norfolk, England

Tenant
- Norwich City (1902 – 1908)

Newmarket Road was the home ground for Norwich City, before they moved to The Nest.

Today, the club plays at Carrow Road, which has been their home ground since 1935.

== History ==
Norwich City F.C. played at Newmarket Road from the club's founding in 1902 to 1908, with a record attendance of 10,366 in a match against The Wednesday in an FA Cup second round match in 1908. Following a dispute over the conditions of renting the Newmarket Road ground, in 1908, the club moved to a new home, in a converted disused chalk pit in Rosary Road which became known as "The Nest".

== Today ==
The site was later purchased by the Town Close House Preparatory & Pre-Preparatory School, which still owns it today. After World War II, Norwich CEYMS played at the ground for a time until the school required it for its own use.
