= Bob Smith (footballer) =

English footballer

Personal information
- Date of birth: 1901
- Place of birth: Walkden, England
- Height: 5 ft 8 1/2 in (1.74 m)
- Position: Left half

Senior career*
Years	Team	Apps	(Gls)
1923–1924	Manchester City	6	(0)
- Pontypridd
1925–1927	Plymouth Argyle	31	(1)
1928–1932	Torquay United	139	(3)
Total		176	(4)
- * Club domestic league appearances and goals

Robert Smith (born 1901; date of death unknown) was an English professional footballer. Born in Walkden, he is notable for becoming the first Torquay United player to make 100 Football League appearances.

== Career ==
Beginning his career with his local non-League team in Walkden, Smith was then signed by Manchester City in 1923. However, the left half made only 6 appearances for City before joining non-League side Pontypridd. Smith soon made his way back into League football again after joining Plymouth Argyle in 1925, making his debut in a 6–2 win over Crystal Palace on 2 September 1925. Smith appeared 31 times for the Pilgrims before eventually finding himself at Plymouth's Devon neighbours Torquay United in 1928.

Smith joined Torquay in time for their second season in the Football League and made his debut in a 4–1 home victory over Newport County on 22 September 1928. Eventually making the left half position his own, Smith missed only two games during the 1929–30 season and was an ever-present throughout United's 1930–31 season. It was during that season that Smith became the first Torquay player to make 100 appearances for the club during the FA Cup Third Round match away to Bury on 10 January 1931.

By the end of the 1931–32 season Smith had made a total of 147 appearances for Torquay, scoring 3 times. After leaving United, Smith never played League football again.
