= Frank Sloan =

Scottish footballer

Personal information
- Full name: Francis John Sloan
- Date of birth: 26 December 1904
- Place of birth: Chapelhall, Scotland
- Date of death: 1974 (aged 69–70)
- Height: 5 ft 9 in (1.75 m)
- Position: Inside right

Senior career*
Years	Team	Apps	(Gls)
–	Shieldmuir Celtic		
1924–1936	Plymouth Argyle	208	(49)
1936–1937	Luton Town	4	(0)
- * Club domestic league appearances and goals

Francis John Sloan (26 December 1904 – 1974) was a Scottish professional footballer who played in the English Football League for Plymouth Argyle and Luton Town. He played as an inside right.

Sloan was born in Chapelhall, North Lanarkshire. He played for Shieldmuir Celtic in his native Scotland before coming to England in 1920 to play for Plymouth Argyle. He made 213 appearances for the club in all competitions over 12 seasons, the last of which came in February 1936. He then spent a brief spell at Luton Town before returning to Argyle as a member of the groundstaff.
