= Billy Clayson =

English footballer (1897–1973)

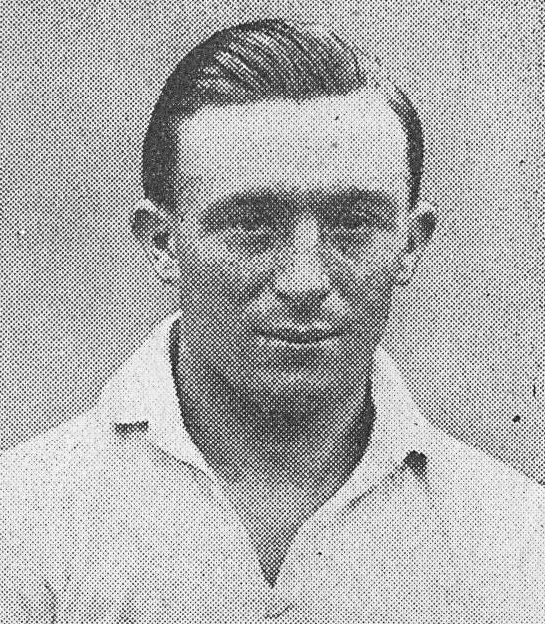
- Clayson while with Brentford in 1924

Personal information
- Full name: William James Clayson
- Date of birth: 12 July 1897
- Place of birth: Wellingborough, England
- Date of death: 1973 (aged 75–76)
- Place of death: Northampton, England
- Position: Inside right

Senior career*
Years	Team	Apps	(Gls)
- Northampton Compton
1919–1922	Wellingborough Town		
1922–1925	Brentford	81	(14)
1925–1926	Crewe Alexandra	35	(12)
1926–1927	Barnsley	10	(2)
1927–1930	Chesterfield	22	(11)
1930	Scarborough		
1930–1932	Torquay United	75	(28)
1932–1933	Scarborough		
1933	York City	7	(0)
- Scarborough
- Scarborough Junior Imperial
- * Club domestic league appearances and goals

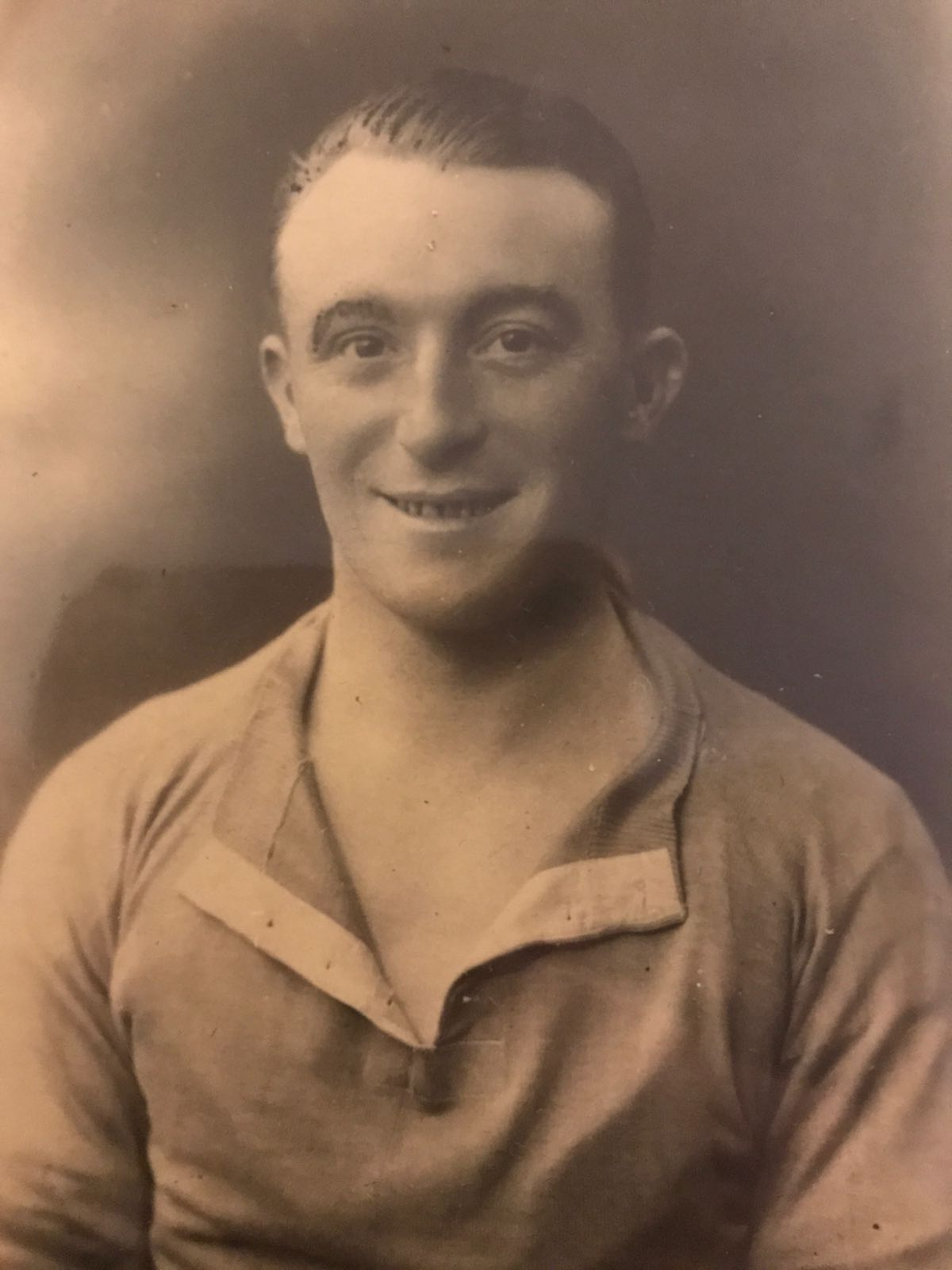
Clayson in 1926.

William James Clayson (12 July 1897 – 1973) was an English professional footballer who played as an inside right in the Football League for Brentford, Crewe Alexandra, Barnsley, Chesterfield, Torquay United and York City. He was a prolific goalscorer for Scarborough across three spells with the club in the Midland League.

== Personal life ==
Prior to becoming a professional footballer, Clayson served in the British Army and later became a publican in Scarborough.

== Career statistics ==
Appearances and goals by club, season and competition
Club	Season	League			FA Cup		Total	
Club	Season	Division	Apps	Goals	Apps	Goals	Apps	Goals
Brentford	1922–23	Third Division South	29	6	3	2	32	8
Brentford	1923–24	Third Division South	26	8	3	2	29	10
Brentford	1924–25	Third Division South	26	0	0	0	26	0
Brentford	Total		81	14	6	4	87	28
Chesterfield	1927–28	Third Division North	22	11	1	0	23	11
Torquay United	1930–31	Third Division South	35	14	4	0	39	14
Torquay United	1931–32	Third Division South	40	14	1	0	41	14
Torquay United	Total		75	28	5	0	80	28
Career Total			178	53	12	4	190	67
