= George Hopkins (comedian) =

American comedian and musician

George Hopkins (July 3, 1928 – February 28, 2011) was an American comedian and musician.

== Early life ==
George Hopkins was born July 3, 1928, in Manayunk, Philadelphia, to Ruth and John Hopkins Sr. He was of half Welsh and half Polish ancestry. He was the youngest of five children, three sisters and a brother. When Hopkins was 16 he lied about his age and enlisted in the United States Navy and served in World War II in the Pacific Theatre.

== Comedy career ==
Hopkins' first professional gig was in 1946 at Jerry's Café in West Philadelphia in the back room of the local bar that had a seating capacity of about 60. Music was provided by a blind organ player. Hopkins did one show on Friday night and one show on Saturday night; he was paid $35 for both nights.

Then Hopkins started to do one-nighters at various venues in Philadelphia such as the 24 Club, Palumbo's and other nightspots in the metropolitan area. Palumbo's was a nightclub with a seating capacity of 400.

George Hopkins' first network television appearance was on Arthur Godfrey's Talent Scouts, telecast on a Monday night. He won the competition. Hopkins recalled, "I thought the female singer, Mary Sullivan was much better than me and she should have won, but the audience picked me." Then Arthur Godfrey booked Hopkins for his Wednesday night network television show, Arthur Godfrey and His Friends. The morning after that telecast, Hopkins began a two-week engagement on Godfrey's network radio show.

Hopkins was actually on Godfrey's live telecast when Godfrey fired Julius La Rosa on the air.

Hopkins' agent Herb Marx in New York booked him into the Village Vanguard. On the bill were Eartha Kitt, Wally Cox, Orson Bean and George Hopkins.

After that, Hopkins started to work in a lot of Manhattan theaters, such as The Jefferson 14th Street Theater, as well as theaters in Brooklyn and the Bronx. Then he appeared at the Palace Theater on 46th and Broadway.

In 1952, NBC executives signed Hopkins to a five-year contract starting at $2500 a week. The producer who set up the contract was Joe Bigelow, who was also a comedy writer for television. Hopkins' first NBC appearance under contract was on a "spectacular," as television specials were called in the 1950s, with Beatrice Lillie, Gordon Jenkins and his orchestra and 23 dancers. The telecast was hosted by George Abbott.

Herb Marx had offices across West 57th Street from Carnegie Hall and in Miami Beach, Florida. In December 1952, Marx sent George Hopkins to the Eden-Roc Hotel in Miami Beach where he opened for Billy Daniels. Then Hopkins performed at the Olympia Theater where he was the comedian who shared billing with Rosemary Clooney and Buddy Rich. Later he played The Caribe Theater with Tony Martin, The Americana Hotel with Vaughn Monroe and the Sans Souci Hotel Miami with Lena Horne and The Nicholas Brothers. Hopkins became well known as a comedian who performed on a bill with popular singers. He also played The Diplomat Hotel in Hollywood, Florida with Tony Bennett.

In 1953, Herb Marx sent Hopkins to perform at the Beverly Hills, California venue, Ye Little Club.

In the 1950s, network television shows on which Hopkins performed included Omnibus, The Ed Sullivan Show and Chance of a Lifetime with Dennis James. Hopkins' only Sullivan appearance was on the Sunday-night CBS network telecast of September 4, 1955. The black-and-white kinescope film from that night, accessible on YouTube and Hopkins' daughter Kim's Facebook page, is possibly the only surviving film of Hopkins performing in the 1950s or 1960s.

In 1965, Hopkins returned to network television after an absence of several years. He appeared on two telecasts of ABC's Nightlife, hosted by Les Crane, during a one-week period in July. Though Nightlife used videotape, neither of the telecasts was preserved for posterity.

Later Hopkins performed at The Slate Brothers Club on La Cienega Blvd. in Los Angeles. Then he performed at a string of Playboy clubs starting at the Playboy Club Sunset Blvd., then Playboy Club Chicago, then Playboy Club Atlanta, then Playboy Club Miami then Playboy Club Arizona, and the Playboy Club New York.

Next Hopkins performed in Las Vegas at the Sahara Hotel in the Casbah Theater. He was booked for a two-week contract, but the management held him over for 10 more weeks. Hopkins performed at the Sahara five different times. One of those times he produced, directed and starred in his own show called "Fantasia International" that stayed for 3 months. Another time at the Sahara Hotel he worked with Tony Bennett and Joey Heatherton.

George Hopkins also headlined at The Flamingo Hotel with a 14-piece band. Next was the Desert Inn, in the John Gregory Revue. Then he performed at The Hacienda with his second wife Jeanette Hopkins, who played piano and sang.

New York City newspaper critic Richmond Shepard noted that Hopkins was one of only two people whom he had ever seen with the ability to perform a "straight-back fall," that is, falling backwards while remaining perfectly straight throughout.

== Music career ==
In 1961, he performed for a short time as drummer/stand-up comedian for The Ventures. The Ventures were famous for their signature song "Walk, Don't Run", which eventually sold over two million copies, along with an unprecedented one million album sales each year from 1961 through 1966.

== Later years ==
Hopkins was diagnosed with untreatable cancer in 1995 at age 69 and was given a year to live. Three years after his cancer diagnosis he lost his sight.

He was the father of four children, Kim Hopkins; actress : The Hollywood Knights, Cheech & Chong's Next Movie, and The Tonight Show, and now following in her fathers footsteps doing stand-up comedy, Leigh Hopkins; hairdresser/ Sportclips Manager and son John Hopkins; who owns an electrical business and youngest daughter Sonni Harris - radio personality. George also has 5 grandchildren, Cary Adams - Corporal Marine and former Fast co. Anti Terrorism Task Force- returned Iraq Veteran, - also one of which is also a comedic actor, Zack Hopkins who was a series regular with Harry Hamlin on the WB show Movie Stars, Jensen Harris, and Elaine Harris.

== Death ==
George Hopkins died February 28, 2011, at his home in Miami, Florida. He was 83.
