= Ted Anderson (footballer) =

English footballer

Personal information
- Full name: Edward Walton Anderson
- Date of birth: 17 July 1911
- Place of birth: Tynemouth, England
- Date of death: 23 March 1979 (aged 67)
- Place of death: Birkenhead, England
- Position: Full back

Youth career
- Framwellgate Moor
- Durham Victoria
- Jarrow
- Worksop Town

Senior career*
Years	Team	Apps	(Gls)
1929–1931	Wolverhampton Wanderers	3	(0)
1931–1933	Torquay United	61	(2)
1933–1935	West Ham United	26	(0)
1935–1937	Chester	23	(0)
1937–1948	Tranmere Rovers	74	(0)
- * Club domestic league appearances and goals

Edward Walton Anderson (17 July 1911 – 23 March 1979) was an English footballer, who played at either full-back or wing-half.

== Career ==
Anderson was playing for Worksop Town when spotted by Wolverhampton Wanderers, moving to Molineux in December 1929. He made his league debut on 11 March 1931 in a 3–0 win over Port Vale. However, the three games he managed during this season proved his only for the club and he moved to Torquay United in December 1931, where he made his debut on Boxing Day in a 3–1 defeat away to Queen's Park Rangers.

He remained a regular that season, replacing Bob Smith, and was ever-present the following season as Torquay finished in 10th place in Division Three (South), their highest finish so far. In June 1933 he was signed by Second Division West Ham United, making 26 league appearances (2 goals) before moving again, this time to Chester in June 1935. In two years at Chester, he made only 23 league appearances, before leaving for Tranmere Rovers in July 1937.

He helped Tranmere to the Third Division (North) title in his first season, making his debut in a 5–0 home win against Carlisle United on 18 September, and was a member of the team relegated straight back down again the following year, though only playing 7 games in the Second Division. The war interrupted his career, but he appeared more frequently for the Prenton Park side after the league restarted in 1946, going on to make a total of 73 league appearances for Rovers.

As the 1947/48 season progressed, it appeared that Anderson had played his final game for Rovers. However, he finally reappeared in the league side on 3 January 1948 playing in a 4–0 defeat away to one of his previous clubs Chester. His final league appearance came on 27 March that year, playing at right back in a 3–2 home defeat by Stockport County.

During the Second World War, Anderson had guested for New Brighton and Wrexham. After his playing career ended he spent time on the coaching staff at Tranmere and Stockport.
