= George Parkin (footballer) =

English footballer

Personal information
- Date of birth: 20 August 1903
- Place of birth: Hunslet, England
- Date of death: 1971 (aged 67 or 68)
- Height: 5 ft 7 1/2 in (1.71 m)
- Position: Wing half

Senior career*
Years	Team	Apps	(Gls)
1921–1924	Halifax Town	36	(0)
1924–1929	Burnley	125	(2)
1929–1931	Chester		
1931	West Ham United	0	(0)
1931–1932	Torquay United	8	(0)
1932–1933	Halifax Town	19	(0)
- Workington
- * Club domestic league appearances and goals

George Parkin (20 August 1903 – 1971) was an English professional footballer who played as a wing half.
