= Archie Bayes =

English footballer

Personal information
- Full name: Archibald William Clayton Bayes
- Date of birth: 25 April 1896
- Place of birth: Bedford, England
- Date of death: 1980 (aged 83–84)
- Position: Goalkeeper

Senior career*
Years	Team	Apps	(Gls)
	Ilford	?	(0)
1925–1938	Torquay United	55	(0)
- * Club domestic league appearances and goals

Archibald William Clayton Bayes (25 April 1896 – 1980) was an English football goalkeeper. He was born in Bedford.

Bayes began his football career with Ilford who he joined after leaving the RAF. He left Ilford to join Torquay United while Torquay were still a non-league club. He remained at Plainmoor as Torquay progressed into the football league, but missed out on playing in Torquay's first ever game in the football league after an injury in training, Laurie Millsom taking his place.

He soon regained his place in the first team, making his league debut on 7 September 1927 in a 1–0 defeat at home to Millwall. He remained a regular until the end of that season, but played mainly as a reserve after the signing of former England international Harold Gough. Although he made the last of his 55 Football League appearances in 1930, he played for Torquay's reserves as late as 1938.
