= Joe Duckworth (footballer) =

English footballer

Personal information
- Full name: Joseph Cullen Duckworth
- Date of birth: 29 April 1898
- Place of birth: Blackburn, England
- Date of death: 1965 (aged 66–67)
- Height: 5 ft 10 in (1.78 m)
- Position: Goalkeeper

Senior career*
Years	Team	Apps	(Gls)
19??–1915	Accrington Stanley		
1915–1921	Blackburn Rovers	5	(0)
1921–1924	Aberdare Athletic	84	(0)
1924–1930	Reading	202	(0)
1930–1932	Brighton & Hove Albion	37	(0)
1932–193?	York City	7	(0)
- * Club domestic league appearances and goals

Joseph Cullen Duckworth (29 April 1898 – 1965) was an English footballer who made more than 300 Football League appearances playing as a goalkeeper.

== Life and career ==
Duckworth was born in Blackburn, Lancashire, in 1898. He played football for Lancashire Combination club Accrington Stanley before signing amateur forms with Blackburn Rovers. He made his Football League debut in the first season after the First World War for Blackburn Rovers, and played five First Division matches for Rovers before joining Aberdare Athletic in July 1921 ahead of their first season in the Football League. He made 84 league appearances over three years in the Third Division South.

He joined Reading in 1924, and missed only one league match in his first four years with the club; he was ever-present in the 1925–26 Football League season as Reading won the Third Division South title. His winner's medal was found in 1991 at a car boot sale in Manchester. He also played in Reading's run to the 1926–27 FA Cup semi-final against eventual winners Cardiff City, and a Cup win against league leaders Sheffield Wednesday in January 1929, where he was singled out for particular praise.

Given a free transfer in 1930, Duckworth then spent two seasons with Brighton & Hove Albion and one with York City.
