= George Hopkins (footballer) =

English footballer (1901–1974)

Personal information
- Full name: George Henry Hopkins
- Date of birth: 11 May 1901
- Place of birth: Sheffield, England
- Date of death: 1974 (aged 72–73)
- Position: Goalkeeper

Senior career*
Years	Team	Apps	(Gls)
1922–1923	Normanton Springs		
1923–1924	Wombwell		
1924–1925	Rotherham County	16	(0)
1925–1926	Normanton Springs		
1926	Newark Town		
1927–1928	Notts County	28	(0)
1928–1929	Scarborough		
1929–1930	Oldham Athletic	0	(0)
1930–1931	Hurst		
1931–1932	Stockport County	0	(0)
Total		44	(0)
- * Club domestic league appearances and goals

George Henry Hopkins (11 May 1901 – 1974) was an English footballer who played in the Football League for Notts County and Rotherham County.
