= Fred McKenzie (footballer) =

Scottish footballer

Personal information
- Full name: Frederick Taylor McKenzie
- Date of birth: 13 November 1903
- Place of birth: Lochee, Scotland
- Date of death: 1979 (aged 75–76)
- Position: Centre half

Senior career*
Years	Team	Apps	(Gls)
- Lochee United
1924–1926	Newport County	67	(1)
1926–1934	Plymouth Argyle	203	(13)
1934–1935	Newport County	22	(0)
- * Club domestic league appearances and goals

Frederick Taylor McKenzie (13 November 1903 – 1979) was a Scottish professional footballer who made nearly 300 appearances in the English Football League playing for Newport County and Plymouth Argyle. He played as a centre half.

McKenzie was born in Lochee, Dundee. He played for Scottish Junior club Lochee United before coming to England in 1924 to play for Newport County. In 1926 he joined Plymouth Argyle. He made 214 appearances for the club in all competitions over eight seasons, the last of which came in April 1934, after which he played for one more season for Newport County.
