= Laurie Millsom =

English footballer (1901–1959)

Personal information
- Full name: Lawrence Millsom
- Date of birth: 3 May 1901
- Place of birth: Rotherham, England
- Date of death: 26 September 1959 (aged 58)
- Place of death: Torquay, England
- Height: 5 ft 10 1/2 in (1.79 m)
- Position: Goalkeeper

Senior career*
Years	Team	Apps	(Gls)
192?–1924	Rotherham Amateurs		
1924–1925	Rotherham County	5	(0)
1925–1926	Rotherham United	0	(0)
1926–1934	Torquay United (Note: Figures include Football League matches only.)	35	(0)
1934–193?	Dartmouth United		
- * Club domestic league appearances and goals

Lawrence Millsom (3 May 1901 – 26 September 1959) was an English professional footballer who made 35 appearances in the Football League playing as a goalkeeper for Rotherham County and Torquay United.

== Personal life ==
Lawrence Millsom was born in Rotherham, in what was then the West Riding of Yorkshire. At the time of the 1911 Census, he was the eldest son of George Millsom, an agent for the Royal London insurance company, and his wife Elizabeth. He married Mabel Margaret Curtis at Kimberworth Parish Church in January 1926. The couple had a son, Brian. Millsom was a keen cricketer at local level. He kept wicket for Kimberworth Wesleyans, and topped the batting averages in the 1925 Rotherham and District Sunday School Cricket League.

The 1939 Register records Millsom and his wife living in Torquay, where he worked in customer service for the municipal electricity board and volunteered with the air raid service. He remained in the same line of work: in the late 1950s, he was manager of the South Western Electricity Board's Paignton service centre, and he spent 13 years as branch secretary of his trade union, NALGO.

Millsom died on 26 September 1959 in Torquay at the age of 58.

== Football career ==
Millsom kept goal for the Rotherham Schools team that played in the English Boys' Shield in 1914, in which they lost heavily to Grimsby Schools in the third round. He was playing in the Sheffield Association League for Rotherham Amateurs by 1922, and signed for Football League Third Division North club Rotherham County in 1924. The Sports Special's correspondent suggested that "Young Millsom has a lot to learn before he is fit for the senior team. Against Nottingham Forest Reserves last Saturday, he did well with a number of shots, but he made one mistake which deprived the Millmoor team of a Midland Combination point they had played well enough to merit."

He made an unexpected Football League debut on 27 December 1924, replacing the regular goalkeeper, George Hopkins, for the home game against Accrington Stanley. On what the Sports Special described as "a sea of mud" – a rainstorm had forced the postponement or abandonment of many games that day – Millsom conceded one goal to "a cross drive which he had little chance to stop", and played well. He kept his place for three more matches, including a 4–0 defeat against Halifax Town in which, according to the Daily Mirror, his "fine display of goalkeeping" saved his team from an even heavier defeat. The arrival of John Mehaffy in mid-January 1925 for a substantial fee restricted Millsom to just one more appearance that season and, after Rotherham County merged with Rotherham Town to form Rotherham United, none at all for the new club's first team in 1925–26. He was not among the 14 players retained by Rotherham for the following season.

In August 1926, Millsom joined Southern League club Torquay United. As at Rotherham, he was primarily a backup goalkeeper. Archie Bayes was first choice, but Millsom made occasional appearances as Torquay won their section of the 1926–27 Southern League and were elected to the Football League. During a training match ahead of the coming season, Bayes suffered a cut to his finger which went septic, so Millsom took his place for Torquay's first ever Football League fixture, at home to Exeter City, and "came out of the test creditably" with a 1-1 draw. He played twice more before Bayes regained fitness, and then over the next four years made only 13 first-team appearances in total, as backup first to Bayes and then to Harold Gough and Joe Wright. In February 1932, Wright was dropped in favour of Millsom. He performed well, Torquay beat Clapton Orient 3–0, and he kept the place until the end of the season. Ten new players came in over the summer, including Percy Maggs as first-choice goalkeeper, and Millsom's first-team career was at an end. He remained with the club for one more season, and was awarded a benefit match in May 1933, at which the attendance was "disappointingly small", at under 2,000.

Millsom moved on briefly to Dartmouth United, champions of the Plymouth and District League. He then took up refereeing, and officiated at Southern League level.
