= Jack Butler (footballer, born 1894) =

English footballer (1894–1961)

Personal information
- Full name: John Dennis Butler
- Date of birth: 14 August 1894
- Place of birth: Colombo, Ceylon
- Date of death: 5 January 1961 (aged 66)
- Place of death: London, England
- Height: 5 ft 11 in (1.80 m)
- Position: Centre half

Youth career
- Dartford
- Fulham Thursday

Senior career*
Years	Team	Apps	(Gls)
1913–1914	Fulham	0	(0)
1914–1930	Arsenal	267	(7)
1930–1932	Torquay United	50	(2)
Total		317	(9)

International career
1924	England	1	(0)

Managerial career
- 1932–1939: Royal Daring
- 1935–1939: Belgium
- 1946: Denmark
- 1946–1947: Torquay United
- 1947–1949: Crystal Palace
- 1953–1955: Colchester United
- * Club domestic league appearances and goals

John Dennis Butler (14 August 1894 – 5 January 1961) was an English footballer, who played in the Football League for Arsenal and Torquay United as a centre-half. He made one appearance for the England national team and went on to a career as a manager, with Torquay United, Crystal Palace and Colchester United in the League. He also managed Royal Daring of Belgium and coached the Belgium national team.

== Football career ==
Born in Colombo (in what is now Sri Lanka) to English parents, Butler moved back to Britain as a child. He played for Dartford and Fulham Thursday as a youth, before signing for Fulham in 1913 and moving to Arsenal in 1914. He played in Arsenal's' reserve side in his first season, before World War I intervened. Butler duly signed up for the Royal Artillery and served in France during the war, and returned to Arsenal after the end of hostilities. By then he had come of age, and with the resumption of first-class football, he made his first-team debut for Arsenal, against Bolton Wanderers on 15 November 1919.

A tall, elegant and clean player, Butler initially played as a traditional "centre half" — i.e. as a central, deep-lying midfielder; he was in competition with Arsenal's' regular centre halves, Chris Buckley and Alex Graham, but by 1924-25, he was the undisputed first-choice centre half, playing in all but three games of the club's League campaign that season. He also won his first and only cap for England, against Belgium on 8 December 1924.

He made a total of 296 appearances for Arsenal, scoring eight goals.

After Arsenal he joined Torquay United, and stayed there for two seasons before becoming a coach at Belgian club Royal Daring, and was coach of the Belgian national side. He later had a spell as a trainer-coach at Leicester City, and the Danish national side in 1946. He later managed Torquay United, Crystal Palace and Colchester United.

He died in 1961, at the age of 66.

== Managerial statistics ==
Team	Nat	From	To	Record				
Team	Nat	From	To	P	W	D	L	Win %
Colchester United	(England)	16 June 1953	14 January 1955	76	16	19	41	21.1

== Honours ==
Arsenal

- FA Cup runner-up: 1926–27
