= Jack Fowler (footballer, born 1902) =

English footballer

Personal information
- Full name: John Collier Fowler
- Date of birth: 17 November 1902
- Place of birth: Salford, England
- Date of death: 28 April 1979 (aged 76)
- Position: Full-back

Youth career
- Droylsden

Senior career*
Years	Team	Apps	(Gls)
1924–1928	Bradford City	13	(0)
1928–1933	Torquay United	180	(10)
Total		193	(10)
- * Club domestic league appearances and goals

John Collier Fowler (17 November 1902 – 28 April 1979) was an English footballer who played as a full-back for Bradford City and Torquay United in the 1920s and 1930s.
