= Ralph Birkett =

English footballer (1913–2002)

Personal information
- Full name: Ralph James Evans Birkett
- Date of birth: 9 January 1913
- Place of birth: Torquay, Devon, England
- Date of death: 2002 (aged 88–89)
- Place of death: Brixham, Devon, England
- Position: Outside right

Youth career
- ?–1930: Dartmouth United

Senior career*
| Years | Team | Apps | (Gls) |
| 1930–1933 | Torquay United | 95 | (19) |
| 1933–1935 | Arsenal | 19 | (7) |
| 1935–1938 | Middlesbrough | 93 | (35) |
| 1938–1939 | Newcastle United | 24 | (3) |

International career
| 1935 | England | 1 | (0) |
- * Club domestic league appearances and goals

Ralph James Evans Birkett (9 January 1913 – 8 July 2002) was an English professional footballer who played once for the England national team.

== Playing career ==
Birkett was discovered by Torquay United while playing for Dartmouth United, moving to Plainmoor as an amateur in 1930. He made his league debut on the right wing on 8 March 1930, starring in a 7–0 win against Bournemouth & Boscombe Athletic, Torquay's first win of the new year. He signed a professional contract with the Third Division South club the same month.

In 1933, after 95 league games in which he scored 19 times for Torquay, Birkett moved to Arsenal for a fee of £1,588, joining the Highbury side during one of the most impressive periods in their history. His First Division debut came on 2 September 1933 against Sheffield Wednesday, at Hillsborough, and initially he established himself in the team, winning a League Championship medal in his first season at the club (1933-34) as well as the 1933 FA Charity Shield. The following season he struggled to make the first team, after an initially bright start; he scored twice in Arsenal's 1934 Charity Shield win, 3–0 over Everton. However, his first-team opportunities became limited, thanks to the good form of Joe Hulme (whom Birkett had been signed to replace) and new signing Alf Kirchen. Birkett left for Middlesbrough in March 1935, after only 19 league appearances for Arsenal, in which he scored 7 goals.

His Middlesbrough debut came on 16 March 1935 against Preston North End and later that year, on 19 October, Birkett made his only international appearance for England, against Northern Ireland; England won 3–1. He was selected to play a second game, but suffered an injury and withdrew. His replacement was a young Stanley Matthews, and that effectively saw the premature end of Birkett's England career. In July 1938, he moved to Newcastle United, but the war intervened and cut short his career — he was only 26 when it began, but was 33 by the time league football resumed. He did play football during the war, including two appearances for Reading (one goal) in the 1942-43 wartime season, and appearances for Darlington and then Torquay in the 1945-46 wartime season.

== Post career life ==
He later returned to Devon, living in retirement in Brixham, until his death in July 2002 at the age of 89.
