= Jimmy Trotter =

English footballer and manager

Personal information
- Full name: James William Trotter
- Date of birth: 25 November 1899
- Place of birth: Easington, England
- Date of death: 17 April 1984 (aged 84)
- Height: 5 ft 9 in (1.75 m)
- Position: Centre-forward

Senior career*
| Years | Team | Apps | (Gls) |
- Parsons Turbine Works
| 1919–1921 | Bury | 48 | (20) |
| 1921–1929 | The Wednesday | 154 | (109) |
| 1930–1931 | Torquay United | 56 | (36) |
| 1931–1933 | Watford | 4 | (1) |
| Total | | 262 | (166) |

Managerial career
- 1956–1961: Charlton
- * Club domestic league appearances and goals

James William Trotter (25 November 1899 – 17 April 1984) was an English professional footballer who played as a centre-forward in the Football League for Bury, The Wednesday, Torquay United and Watford. He later became a manager.

== Playing career ==
Born in Easington, County Durham, Trotter served in the Royal Garrison Artillery during the First World War. His professional career began with Bury from where he joined The Wednesday in 1921. He scored 109 goals in 154 League matches, including five in one game against Portsmouth in December 1924. During his tenure at The Wednesday he was the leading goalscorer of the Second Division in the season 1925–26 and in the First Division in the season 1926–27. During both seasons he scored 37 goals in the league.

Trotter joined Torquay United in 1930 and scored 26 goals in his first season at Plainmoor before losing his place due to a knee injury. He moved to Watford in the 1932–33 season but retired as a player after only a few games.

== Managerial career ==
Trotter had originally joined Charlton as a trainer twenty two years earlier under Jimmy Seed, but after Seed's sacking he was appointed manager in 1956, although he was unable to prevent relegation that season in 1957. In the following season saw the extraordinary match against Huddersfield Town F.C. at The Valley on 21 December 1957. Charlton played most of the match with 10 men after their captain Derek Ufton was injured, and Huddersfield were leading 5–1 with just 27 minutes remaining. At that point, Johnny Summers began an extraordinary passage of play in which he scored five goals and assisted with two others to allow Charlton to win 7–6. Huddersfield become the first, and still the only, team to score six goals in an English Football League match – or indeed any other professional football match – and still be on the losing side. Trotter came close to taking the Addicks back into the top flight that season, but lost 4–3 to Blackburn Rovers on the final day of the season, when a draw would have seen Charlton promoted.

The remaining seasons under Trotter's charge saw finishes of eighth, seventh and tenth before he was fired in 1961 after just one victory in twelve games.
