= The Nest (football ground) =

Former home ground of Norwich City F.C.

Coordinates: 52°37′47″N 1°18′37″E

- Former location of The Nest
- Full name: The Nest
- Location: Rosary Road, Norwich, England
- Surface: Grass
- Record attendance: 25,037

Construction
- Opened: 1908
- Closed: 1935

Tenant
- Norwich City F.C. 1908-1935

The Nest was a former home ground of the association football team Norwich City F.C. The club used the Nest for 27 years between 1908 and 1935. Before that, the team played at Newmarket Road (1902-1908). It now plays its home games at Carrow Road.

The first competitive match at the stadium was a 0–0 draw with Portsmouth on 12 September 1908, with the final match being a 2–2 draw with Swansea Town on 4 May 1935. The record attendance for a match at The Nest was 25,037 for an FA Cup fifth-round tie against Sheffield Wednesday on 16 February 1935.

== History ==
The ground was built within a disused quarry on Rosary Road, making it similar in appearance to Charlton Athletic's The Valley. Following the adoption of the club's nickname of "The Canaries", the ground was appropriately named. Its most noticeable feature was a large concrete wall at one end of the ground, which supported a cliff on which supporters would watch the matches.

Thousands of tons of earth had to be shifted before a pitch could be laid and stands erected and there then followed the process of dismantling the old Newmarket Road structures and moving them painstakingly by horse and cart to their new home on the other side of the city.

Chairman John Pyke, the man behind the switch, kicked off the first game at City's new home on 1 September 1908 as City beat Fulham 2–1 in a friendly in front of a crowd of around 3,000. An FA Cup tie against Reading later in the year had to be switched to a neutral venue when City's opponents complained that The Nest's pitch was not big enough, but the club soon settled into their new home and it was not long before five-figure crowds were packing into the compact little ground.

The Nest was gradually improved over the years, with the playing surface re-laid and extra terracing added, and by the time the Canaries were elected to the Football League in 1920 crowds of between 12,000 and 14,000 were commonplace.

Further developments in the 1930s, including an extension to the "chicken run" opposite the Main Stand, saw the capacity rise still further and, on 16 February 1935, 25,037 supporters crammed into the ground to watch City lose 1–0 to Sheffield Wednesday in the fifth round of the FA Cup.

By then, The Nest's days were well and truly numbered. Concern over the facilities had already been expressed by Norwich City directors and the matter came to a head just a month after the big cup tie when the Football Association wrote to the club saying they were not satisfied the ground was suitable to house large crowds.

With the Canaries having been recently promoted to the Second Division it was quickly decided that the time was right to move on and City kicked off the next season at their new stadium, Carrow Road, which had been constructed in just 82 days.

Motorcycle football was also held at The Nest during the 1930s. Matches were played over two 35-minute halves.

== Modern site ==
The Nest stood derelict for many years after being declared surplus to requirements before the site was redeveloped after the war. It was occupied for a time by Bertram Books' factory and offices, but it is now a housing development. A small section of the concrete wall is all that remains of The Nest. In February 2012, the site was marked by the installation of a sculpture of a ball passing between two tall posts.

== Legacy ==
In 2018 City opened a community sports foundation at Horsford, which is named The Nest, after the former ground.
