= 1927–28 Torquay United F.C. season =

Torquay United
1927–28 season
- Chairman: Charles Hore
- Manager: Percy Mackrill
- Third Division South: 22nd
- FA Cup: Did not enter
- Top goalscorer: Bert Turner (11)
- Highest home attendance: 10,749 v Exeter City, 27 August 1927
- Lowest home attendance: 2,156 v Brighton & Hove Albion, 1 October 1927
- Average home league attendance: 4,175
Home colours

The 1927–28 Torquay United F.C. season was Torquay United's first season in the Football League and their first season in Third Division South. The season runs from 1 July 1927 to 30 June 1928.

== Overview ==
Under the guidance of player-manager Percy Mackrill, Torquay United won the Western section of the Southern League in 1927 in only their sixth season as a professional football club. This achievement (along with an impressive three-leg resistance against high-flying Reading in the 1925–26 FA Cup) earned Torquay election to the Football League in time for the 1927–28 Third Division South season, at the expense of Aberdare Athletic.

After an encouraging Football League debut – a 1–1 draw against Exeter City in front of over 10,000 supporters at their Plainmoor home ground – Torquay then suffered a humiliating 9–1 defeat away to eventual champions Millwall two days later. Although United did manage to restore some dignity in their next game with a 3–1 win away to fellow strugglers Merthyr Town, the season would prove to be a challenge for the debutants. Among the few highlights of a tough campaign were Bert Turner's hat-trick during the 4–2 win over Norwich City in January and the home and away victories over Brentford and Queens Park Rangers. Incidentally, Torquay were excused from this season's FA Cup as the additional qualifying rounds which had already been allocated to them before their election would have caused a significant disruption to their League fixtures.

Notable players during Torquay's first League season included the aforementioned Turner (top scorer with 11 goals), outside right Jim Mackey who played in all but two games and goalkeeper Archie Bayes who, despite missing out on the debut match against Exeter City, played a total of 37 games during the season. Significant contributions were also made by centre forwards Bob Ringland (9 goals in 14 appearances) and Lew Griffiths (8 goals in 12 appearances). However, of these players, only Mackey would still be lining up for Torquay during the following season.

With only 8 wins from 42 games, Torquay United ended their first season in the Third Division South in last place and had to seek re-election in order to remain in the Football League for the 1928–29 season.

== League statistics ==
=== Third Division South ===
Pos	Team	Pld	W	D	L	GF	GA	GAv	Pts	Promotion
18	Walsall	42	12	9	21	75	101	0.743	33	
19	Bristol Rovers	42	14	4	24	67	93	0.720	32	
20	Coventry City	42	11	9	22	67	96	0.698	31	
21	Merthyr Town	42	9	13	20	53	91	0.582	31	Re-elected
22	Torquay United	42	8	14	20	53	103	0.515	30	Re-elected

==== Results summary ====
Overall								Home						Away					
Pld	W	D	L	GF	GA	GAv	Pts	W	D	L	GF	GA	Pts	W	D	L	GF	GA	Pts
42	8	14	20	53	103	0.515	30	4	10	7	27	36	18	4	4	13	26	67	12

Source: rsssf.com

==== Results by round ====
Round	1	2	3	4	5	6	7	8	9	10	11	12	13	14	15	16	17	18	19	20	21	22	23	24	25	26	27	28	29	30	31	32	33	34	35	36	37	38	39	40	41	42
Ground	H	A	A	H	A	H	A	H	A	H	H	A	H	A	H	H	A	H	H	A	H	A	H	A	H	A	H	A	A	H	A	A	H	A	A	H	H	A	H	A	A	H
Result	D	L	W	L	L	L	L	D	D	W	L	L	L	W	W	D	L	D	L	L	D	L	W	D	D	L	D	W	L	D	L	L	D	W	L	L	L	D	W	L	D	D
Position	11	17	13	18	21	22	22	21	22	18	20	20	21	21	17	17	19	17	21	22	21	21	21	21	20	21	21	21	21	21	21	21	22	22	22	22	22	22	22	22	22	22

Source: statto.com
A = Away; H = Home; W = Win; D = Draw; L = Loss

== Match of the season ==
TORQUAY UNITED 1–1 EXETER CITY
Third Division South
Plainmoor, 27 August 1927

TORQUAY UNITED	EXETER CITY

TORQUAY UNITED:
GK	1	(England) Laurie Millsom
RB	2	(England) George Cook
LB	3	(England) George Smith
RH	4	(England) Maurice Wellock
CH	5	(England) Frank Wragge
LH	6	(Scotland) Jack Conner
OR	7	(England) Jim Mackey
IR	8	(England) Bert Turner
CF	9	(Wales) Jimmy Jones
IL	10	(Scotland) Tom McGovern
OL	11	(Scotland) Dan Thomson

Torquay United's very first match in the Football League was a Devon derby with nearest rivals Exeter City. Percy Mackrill fielded a side which would have been largely unfamiliar to supporters who had watched the Magpies in the Southern League. Fourteen new players were signed by Torquay before their first League campaign began and ten of those made their debuts in the first match of the season. Only Laurie Millsom had previously played for the Magpies before and he was only selected due to an injury to first choice keeper Archie Bayes (a Torquay veteran himself).

Player-manager Mackrill declined to select himself at left back, instead choosing George Smith to partner George Cook in defence. Centre half Frank Wragge anchored the midfield with captain Jack Conner on his left and (despite being an experienced forward) Maurice Wellock playing as a right wing half. Meanwhile, Welsh centre forward Jimmy Jones was flanked by inside forwards Tom McGovern and Bert Turner while Dan Thomson and Jim Mackey adopted the outside forward positions.

Torquay's debut Football League game ended in a 1–1 draw, with Bert Turner scoring the home side's goal from the penalty spot and Exeter's Billy Vaughan scoring a late equaliser for the visitors.

== Results ==
=== Third Division South ===
27 Aug 1927	Torquay United	1–1	Exeter City	Plainmoor
	Turner (pen.)		Vaughan	Attendance: 10,749

29 Aug 1927	Millwall	9–1	Torquay United	The Den
	Goal		Thomson	Attendance: 6,204

3 Sep 1927	Merthyr Town	1–3	Torquay United	Penydarren Park
	Goal		Jones; Thomson	Attendance: 4,644

7 Sep 1927	Torquay United	0–1	Millwall	Plainmoor
			Goal	Attendance: 5,413

10 Sep 1927	Norwich City	4–0	Torquay United	The Nest
	Goal			Attendance: 12,887

17 Sep 1927	Torquay United	1–5	Northampton Town	Plainmoor
	Turner		Goal	Attendance: 4,625

24 Sep 1927	Southend United	1–0	Torquay United	The Kursaal
	Goal			Attendance: 8,546

1 Oct 1927	Torquay United	1–1	Brighton & Hove Albion	Plainmoor
	Jones		Goal	Attendance: 2,156

8 Oct 1927	Bournemouth & Boscombe Athletic	1–1	Torquay United	Dean Court
	Goal		Wellock	Attendance: 5,781

15 Oct 1927	Torquay United	2–1	Brentford	Plainmoor
	Turner (pen.); Pattison		Goal	Attendance: 4,185

22 Oct 1027	Torquay United	1–2	Charlton Athletic	Plainmoor
	Daniel		Goal	Attendance: 4,816

29 Oct 1927	Bristol Rovers	5–1	Torquay United	Eastville Stadium
	Goal		Wellock	Attendance: 6,824

5 Nov 1927	Torquay United	1–2	Plymouth Argyle	Plainmoor
	Jones		Forbes; Black	Attendance: 9,172

12 Nov 1927	Watford	1–2	Torquay United	Vicarage Road
	Goal		Daniel; Turner	Attendance: 6,929

19 Nov 1927	Torquay United	1–0	Queens Park Rangers	Plainmoor
	Jones			Attendance: 2,235

3 Dec 1927	Torquay United	1–1	Newport County	Plainmoor
	Wellock		Waterston	Attendance: 3,489

10 Dec 1927	Walsall	4–0	Torquay United	Fellows Park
	Goal			Attendance: 3,610

17 Dec 1927	Torquay United	1–1	Gillingham	Plainmoor
	Turner (pen.)		Goal	Attendance: 2,992

27 Dec 1927	Torquay United	0–2	Crystal Palace	Plainmoor
			Goal	Attendance: 3,353

31 Dec 1927	Exeter City	5–0	Torquay United	St James Park
	Goal			Attendance: 8,224

7 Jan 1928	Torquay United	2–2	Merthyr Town	Plainmoor
	Jones; Ringland		Goal	Attendance: 3,234

14 Jan 1928	Coventry City	5–1	Torquay United	Highfield Road
	Goal		Ringland	Attendance: 6,878

21 Jan 1928	Torquay United	4–2	Norwich City	Plainmoor
	Turner; Ringland		Goal	Attendance: 3,336

28 Jan 1928	Northampton Town	4–4	Torquay United	County Ground
	Goal		Mackey; Turner; Pattison; Ringland	Attendance: 4,832

4 Feb 1928	Torquay United	3–3	Southend United	Plainmoor
	Ringland; McGovern		Goal	Attendance: 3,419

11 Feb 1928	Brighton & Hove Albion	3–0	Torquay United	Goldstone Ground
	Goal			Attendance: 7,430

18 Feb 1928	Torquay United	2–2	Bournemouth & Boscombe Athletic	Plainmoor
	Ringland		Goal	Attendance: 4,236

25 Feb 1928	Brentford	1–2	Torquay United	Griffin Park
	Goal		Pattison; Ringland	Attendance: 8,355

3 Mar 1928	Charlton Athletic	1–0	Torquay United	The Valley
	Goal			Attendance: 8,290

10 Mar 1928	Torquay United	0–0	Bristol Rovers	Plainmoor
				Attendance: 4,078

14 Mar 1928	Crystal Palace	3–2	Torquay United	Selhurst Park
	Goal		Mackey; Pattison	Attendance: 4,842

17 Mar 1928	Plymouth Argyle	4–1	Torquay United	Home Park
	Richards; Matthews		Russell (o.g.)	Attendance: 9,008

24 Mar 1928	Torquay United	1–1	Watford	Plainmoor
	Turner		Goal	Attendance: 3,750

31 Mar 1928	Queens Park Rangers	2–3	Torquay United	Loftus Road
	Goal		Turner; Griffiths	Attendance: 5,839

6 Apr 1928	Luton Town	5–0	Torquay United	Kenilworth Road
	Goal			Attendance: 10,397

7 Apr 1928	Torquay United	2–3	Coventry City	Plainmoor
	Budd; Griffiths (pen.)		Goal	Attendance: 3,275

9 Apr 1928	Torquay United	0–4	Luton Town	Plainmoor
			Goal	Attendance: 2,994

14 Apr 1928	Newport County	2–2	Torquay United	Somerton Park
	Waterston; Barratt		Budd; Griffiths	Attendance: 3,199

21 Apr 1928	Torquay United	2–1	Swindon Town	Plainmoor
	Griffiths		Goal	Attendance: 2,808

28 Apr 1928	Gillingham	4–1	Torquay United	Priestfield
	Goal		Pattison	Attendance: 3,868

2 May 1928	Swindon Town	2–2	Torquay United	County Ground
	Goal		Griffiths	Attendance: 2,528

5 May 1928	Torquay United	1–1	Walsall	Plainmoor
	Mackey		Goal	Attendance: 3,365

== Club statistics ==
=== First team appearances ===
Nat	Pos	Player	Third Division South
Nat	Pos	Player	Apps	Goals
(England)	GK	Archie Bayes	37	0
(England)	GK	Laurie Millsom	5	0
(England)	DF	George Cook	29	0
(England)	DF	Jack Price	26	0
(South Africa)	DF	Percy Mackrill	6	0
(England)	DF	George Smith	6	0
(England)	MF	Claude Gough	28	0
(England)	MF	Frank Wragge	27	0
(Scotland)	MF	Jack Conner	24	0
(England)	MF	Charlie Davis	18	0
(Scotland)	MF	Hugh Good	16	0
(Wales)	MF	David Daniel	15	2
(England)	MF	Frank Clarke	6	0
(England)	FW	Jim Mackey (footballer)	40	3
(England)	FW	Bert Turner	38	11
(England)	FW	Maurice Wellock	27	3
(England)	FW	Jack Pattison	26	5
(Wales)	FW	Jimmy Jones	20	6
(Scotland)	FW	Tom McGovern	18	1
(England)	FW	Bob Ringland	14	9
(Wales)	FW	Lew Griffiths	12	8
(Scotland)	FW	Dan Thomson	11	2
(England)	FW	Herbert Budd	7	2
(Wales)	FW	Alwyn Thomas	5	0
(England)	FW	George Orrick	3	0
(England)	FW	Alf Knapman	1	0

=== Top scorers ===
Place	Position	Nation	Name	Third Division South
1	FW	(England)	Bert Turner	11
2	FW	(England)	Bob Ringland	9
3	FW	(Wales)	Lew Griffiths	8
4	FW	(Wales)	Jimmy Jones	6
5	FW	(England)	Jack Pattison	5
6	FW	(England)	Jim Mackey	3
=	FW	(England)	Maurice Wellock	3
8	FW	(England)	Herbert Budd	2
=	MF	(Wales)	David Daniel	2
=	FW	(Scotland)	Dan Thomson	2
11	FW	(Scotland)	Tom McGovern	1
			Own goals	1
			TOTAL	53

=== Transfers ===
==== In ====
First appearance	Nat.	Pos.	Name	From
27 August 1927	(Scotland)	MF	Jack Connor	Newport County
27 August 1927	(England)	DF	George Cook	Preston North End
27 August 1927	(Wales)	FW	Jimmy Jones	Aberdare Athletic
27 August 1927	(England)	FW	Jim Mackey	West Stanley
27 August 1927	(Scotland)	FW	Tom McGovern	Queen of the South
27 August 1927	(England)	DF	George Smith	Walsall
27 August 1927	(Scotland)	FW	Dan Thomson	Bournemouth & Boscombe
27 August 1927	(England)	FW	Bert Turner	Brierley Hill Alliance
27 August 1927	(England)	FW	Maurice Wellock	Oldham Athletic
27 August 1927	(England)	MF	Frank Wragge	Stafford Rangers
3 September 1927	(England)	MF	Charlie Davis	Bath City
3 September 1927	(England)	DF	Jack Price	Brentford
17 September 1927	(England)	MF	Claude Gough	Queens Park Rangers
3 December 1927	(England)	FW	George Orrick	Bristol City
17 December 1927	(England)	FW	Herbert Budd	Bude
27 December 1927	(England)	FW	Bob Ringland	Cupar (Ireland)
14 January 1928	(England)	FW	Len Knapman	Unattached
18 February 1928	(Scotland)	MF	Hugh Good	Bristol City
31 March 1928	(England)	MF	Frank Clarke	Coventry City

==== Out ====
Last appearance	Nat.	Pos.	Name	To
17 September 1927	(England)	DF	George Smith	Exmouth Town
17 December 1927	(England)	FW	George Orrick	Shiney Row Swifts
27 December 1927	(Wales)	MF	David Daniel	Released
31 December 1927	(Scotland)	FW	Dan Thomson	Walsall
14 January 1928	(Wales)	FW	Jimmy Jones	Worcester City
14 January 1928	(England)	FW	Alf Knapman	Dartmouth United
7 April 1928	(England)	MF	Frank Clarke	Leamington Town
7 April 1928	(England)	FW	Maurice Wellock	Peterborough & Fletton United
9 April 1928	(England)	MF	Claude Gough	Clapton Orient
9 April 1928	(England)	FW	Bob Ringland	Broadway United
28 April 1928	(Scotland)	FW	Tom McGovern	Sheppey United
5 May 1928	(Scotland)	MF	Jack Connor	Released
5 May 1928	(England)	DF	George Cook	Carlisle United
5 May 1928	(Scotland)	MF	Hugh Good	Raith Rovers
5 May 1928	(Wales)	FW	Lew Griffiths	Crystal Palace
5 May 1928	(England)	FW	Jack Pattison	Taunton United
5 May 1928	(England)	FW	Bert Turner	Bristol Rovers
5 May 1928	(England)	MF	Frank Wragge	Walsall
