= 1928–29 Torquay United F.C. season =

Torquay United
1928–29 season
- Chairman: Charles Hore
- Manager: Percy Mackrill (until March 1929)
- Third Division South: 18th
- FA Cup: Second round
- Top goalscorer: League: Cyril Hemingway (11); All: Cyril Hemingway (12)
- Highest home attendance: 11,114 v Exeter City, 8 December 1928 (FA Cup)
- Lowest home attendance: 2,928 v Bristol Rovers, 5 January 1929 (Third Division South)
- Average home league attendance: 4,918
Home colours

The 1928–29 Torquay United F.C. season was Torquay United's second season in the Football League and their second consecutive season in Third Division South. The season runs from 1 July 1928 to 30 June 1929.

== Overview ==
Having finished bottom of the table for the 1927–28 season in only their first year in the Football League, Torquay United needed to apply for re-election in order to remain in the Third Division South. Fortunately, for the Magpies, the League members voted in their favour and manager Percy Mackrill set about rebuilding the team in an attempt to make a more competitive showing in their second League campaign. Mackrill made wholesale changes which meant an entirely new first eleven took to the field at Plainmoor on the first day of the season. Despite losing their opening game 4–3 to Queens Park Rangers, it wasn't long before Torquay began producing a much more attacking style of football, demonstrated by high scoring victories over Brighton & Hove Albion and Merthyr Town.

Perhaps the most impressive of all the new signings was the former Morton centre forward Bill Henderson who scored 10 goals in 15 games before his season was ended by injury in the home defeat to Coventry City in November. Also coming up with the goals were Cyril Hemingway and Bill Gardner, with Hemingway ending the season as top scorer with 12 in all competitions. Two other strong additions to the team were ex-England goalkeeper Harold Gough and full-back Jack Fowler who would become a crucial part of the Torquay defence for several seasons to come. Mackrill also managed to discover some local talent in the form of Babbacombe born Sid Cann. The promising young defender was only 16 when he made his League debut against Crystal Palace in September and made an impressive 17 appearances in his first season at United.

Despite some encouraging performances at the start season (including a 5–1 demolition of Gillingham in the FA Cup), Torquay's form took a serious dip in the New Year. February and March saw the Magpies lose 9 out of their 10 League games and only a late rally towards the end of the season steered the club away from the need for re-election for a second consecutive year. Although an 18th-place finish represented some kind of progress for United, with Percy Mackrill leaving the club before the end of the season, another fresh start would be required for Torquay's third year in the Football League.

== League statistics ==
=== Third Division South ===
Pos	Team	Pld	W	D	L	GF	GA	GAv	Pts
16	Newport County	42	13	9	20	69	86	0.802	35
17	Norwich City	42	14	6	22	69	81	0.852	34
18	Torquay United	42	14	6	22	66	84	0.786	34
19	Bristol Rovers	42	13	7	22	60	79	0.759	33
20	Merthyr Town	42	11	8	23	55	103	0.534	30

==== Results summary ====
Overall								Home						Away					
Pld	W	D	L	GF	GA	GAv	Pts	W	D	L	GF	GA	Pts	W	D	L	GF	GA	Pts
42	14	6	22	66	84	0.786	34	10	3	8	46	36	23	4	3	14	20	48	11

Source: rsssf.com

==== Results by round ====
Round	1	2	3	4	5	6	7	8	9	10	11	12	13	14	15	16	17	18	19	20	21	22	23	24	25	26	27	28	29	30	31	32	33	34	35	36	37	38	39	40	41	42
Ground	H	A	A	H	H	A	H	A	H	A	H	A	H	A	H	H	H	A	A	H	A	H	A	H	A	A	H	H	A	H	A	H	A	A	H	H	A	H	A	A	A	H
Result	L	D	L	W	W	L	W	L	L	W	W	L	W	L	L	W	W	L	L	D	L	L	W	W	L	L	L	L	W	L	L	L	L	L	D	D	D	W	D	L	W	W
Position	14	16	18	14	10	13	9	14	14	13	12	14	10	12	14	14	12	14	14	14	14	14	15	15	15	15	15	17	15	16	17	18	19	20	18	18	18	19	18	19	18	18

Source: statto.com
A = Away; H = Home; W = Win; D = Draw; L = Loss

== Match of the season ==
FULHAM 2–1 TORQUAY UNITED
Third Division South
Craven Cottage, 25 December 1928

FULHAM	TORQUAY UNITED

TORQUAY UNITED:
GK	1	(England) Harold Gough
RB	2	(England) Jack Fowler
LB	3	(Scotland) Willie Brown
RH	4	(England) Arthur Chamberlain
CH	5	(England) Charlie Davis
LH	6	(England) Arthur Smeaton
OR	7	(England) Jim Mackey
IR	8	(Wales) Alwyn Thomas
CF	9	(England) Bill Gardner
IL	10	(England) Cyril Hemingway
OL	11	(England) Harry Waller

With an attendance of 20,327, this Christmas Day meeting at Craven Cottage was the largest crowd that a Torquay United team had yet to play in front of. This was Fulham's first season in Third Division South after having been in the Second Division since 1907 and this would have been viewed as one of toughest fixtures of the season by the Magpies, who had been beaten 3–0 away to Southend just three days previously. However, Torquay did not disgrace themselves in front of the huge crowd and came away from the Cottage with a fairly respectable 2–1 defeat, United's goal coming from the Welsh inside forward Alwyn Thomas.

Playing in the heart of defence that day in front of ex-England goalkeeper Harold Gough was Willie Brown (who had earlier in the season lost his place to teenage sensation Sid Cann) and the so-called 'Rock of Gibraltar' Jack Fowler, who played in all but four matches for Torquay during the season. Reliable marksman Cyril Hemingway did not make the scoresheet that day, while goalscorer Alwyn Thomas was playing only his third game of the season after coming in for Dan Kelly. Bill Gardner, meanwhile, had only recently returned to the side due to Bill Henderson's unfortunate injury in November.

The two teams met again at Plainmoor the following day for the Boxing Day fixture (with Jim Carrick replacing Arthur Smeaton at left half). Jim Mackey scored Torquay's goal in a game which ended in a 1–1 draw.

== Results ==
=== Third Division South ===
25 Aug 1928	Torquay United	3–4	Queens Park Rangers	Plainmoor
	Hemingway; Henderson; Kelly		Goal	Attendance: 7,357

29 Aug 1928	Gillingham	1–1	Torquay United	Priestfield
	Goal		Henderson	Attendance: 4,501

1 Sep 1928	Bristol Rovers	2–1	Torquay United	Eastville Stadium
	Goal		E. Price	Attendance: 9,965

5 Sep 1928	Torquay United	2–1	Gillingham	Plainmoor
	Henderson; Gardner		Goal	Attendance: 5,006

8 Sep 1928	Torquay United	1–0	Watford	Plainmoor
	Henderson			Attendance: 6,047

15 Sep 1928	Walsall	1–0	Torquay United	Fellows Park
	Goal			Attendance: 5,706

22 Sep 1928	Torquay United	4–1	Newport County	Plainmoor
	Gardner; Henderson; Richardson (o.g.)		Wardell	Attendance: 5,908

29 Sep 1928	Crystal Palace	2–0	Torquay United	Selhurst Park
	Goal			Attendance: 14,901

6 Oct 1928	Torquay United	2–4	Swindon Town	Plainmoor
	Gardner; Waller		Goal	Attendance: 5,823

13 Oct 1928	Exeter City	1–3	Torquay United	St James Park
	Goal		Henderson; Waller; Kelly	Attendance: 10,553

20 Oct 1928	Torquay United	5–1	Brighton & Hove Albion	Plainmoor
	Henderson; Hemingway; Waller		Goal	Attendance: 5,137

27 Oct 1928	Norwich City	3–0	Torquay United	The Nest
	Goal			Attendance: 6,975

3 Nov 1928	Torquay United	3–1	Charlton Athletic	Plainmoor
	Henderson; Smith		Goal	Attendance: 4,639

10 Nov 1928	Northampton Town	6–1	Torquay United	County Ground
	Goal		Henderson	Attendance: 8,384

17 Nov 1928	Torquay United	0–2	Coventry City	Plainmoor
			Goal	Attendance: 5,057

1 Dec 1928	Torquay United	4–1	Brentford	Plainmoor
	Carrick; Mackey; Waller; Hemingway		Goal	Attendance: 4,614

15 Dec 1928	Torquay United	6–2	Merthyr Town	Plainmoor
	Gardner; Hemingway; Thomas		Goal	Attendance: 2,969

22 Dec 1928	Southend United	3–0	Torquay United	The Kursaal
	Goal			Attendance: 4,096

25 Dec 1928	Fulham	2–1	Torquay United	Craven Cottage
	Goal		Thomas	Attendance: 20,327

26 Dec 1928	Torquay United	1–1	Fulham	Plainmoor
	Mackey		Goal	Attendance: 6,028

29 Dec 1928	Queens Park Rangers	5–1	Torquay United	Loftus Road
	Goal		Waller	Attendance: 11,471

5 Jan 1929	Torquay United	0–1	Bristol Rovers	Plainmoor
			Goal	Attendance: 2,928

19 Jan 1929	Watford	0–2	Torquay United	Vicarage Road
			Hill	Attendance: 7,974

26 Jan 1929	Torquay United	3–2	Walsall	Plainmoor
	Hill; Humphrey; Kelly		Goal	Referee: 4,288

2 Feb 1929	Newport County	4–1	Torquay United	Somerton Park
	Maidment; Pugh; G. Richardson; Wardell		Hemingway	Attendance: 1,835

6 Feb 1929	Bournemouth & Boscombe Athletic	4–3	Torquay United	Dean Court
	Goal		Mackey; Kelly	Attendance: 2,903

9 Feb 1929	Torquay United	1–2	Crystal Palace	Plainmoor
	Gardner		Goal	Attendance: 4,178

23 Feb 1929	Torquay United	1–3	Exeter City	Plainmoor
	Hemingway (pen.)		Goal	Attendance: 5,262

2 Mar 1929	Brighton & Hove Albion	1–2	Torquay United	Goldstone Ground
	Goal		Hill; Waller	Attendance: 5,589

9 Mar 1929	Torquay United	0–3	Norwich City	Plainmoor
			Goal	Attendance: 4,324

16 Mar 1929	Charlton Athletic	2–0	Torquay United	The Valley
	Goal			Attendance: 10,430

23 Mar 1929	Torquay United	0–1	Northampton Town	Plainmoor
			Goal	Attendance: 3,655

29 Mar 1929	Plymouth Argyle	4–0	Torquay United	Home Park
	Richards; Mackay			Attendance: 13,040

30 Mar 1929	Coventry City	2–1	Torquay United	Highfield Road
	Goal		Kelly	Attendance: 12,788

1 Apr 1929	Torquay United	2–2	Plymouth Argyle	Plainmoor
	Smeaton (pen.) (pen.)		Forbes; Pullen	Attendance: 7,053

6 Apr 1929	Torquay United	2–2	Luton Town	Plainmoor
	Waller; Smeaton		Goal	Attendance: 3,909

13 Apr 1929	Brentford	0–0	Torquay United	Griffin Park
				Attendance: 4,507

20 Apr 1929	Torquay United	4–1	Bournemouth & Boscombe Athletic	Plainmoor
	Hill; Hemingway; Kelly		Goal	Attendance: 4,170

24 Apr 1929	Swindon Town	1–1	Torquay United	County Ground
	Goal		Smeaton	Attendance: 1,757

27 Apr 1929	Merthyr Town	3–0	Torquay United	Penydarren Park
	Goal			Attendance: 2,574

29 Apr 1929	Luton Town	1–2	Torquay United	Kenilworth Road
	Goal		Kelly; Humphrey	Attendance: 3,155

4 May 1929	Torquay United	2–1	Southend United	Plainmoor
	Waller; Hill		Goal	Attendance: 4,937

=== FA Cup ===
24 Nov 1928 First round	Gillingham	0–0	Torquay United	Priestfield
				Attendance: 5,869

28 Nov 1928 First round replay	Torquay United	5–1	Gillingham	Plainmoor
	Gardner; Waller; Kelly; Hemingway		Goal	Attendance: 7,000

8 Dec 1928 Second round	Torquay United	0–1	Exeter City	Plainmoor
			Goal	Attendance: 11,114

== Club statistics ==
=== First team appearances ===
Nat	Pos	Player	Total		Third Division South		FA Cup
Nat	Pos	Player	Apps	Goals	Apps	Goals	Apps	Goals
(England)	GK	Harold Gough	42	0	39	0	3	0
(England)	GK	Laurie Millsom	3	0	3	0	0	0
(England)	DF	Jack Fowler	41	0	38	0	3	0
(Scotland)	DF	Willie Brown	19	0	16	0	3	0
(England)	DF	Sid Cann	17	0	17	0	0	0
(England)	DF	James Mellon	10	0	10	0	0	0
(England)	DF	Jack Price	5	0	5	0	0	0
(England)	DF	Eric Price	3	1	3	1	0	0
(England)	MF	Jim Carrick	32	2	29	2	3	0
(England)	MF	Bob Smith	32	1	29	1	3	0
(England)	MF	Arthur Smeaton	30	4	27	4	3	0
(Scotland)	MF	Bob Preston	15	0	15	0	0	0
(England)	MF	Arthur Chamberlain	11	0	11	0	0	0
(England)	MF	Charlie Davis	10	0	10	0	0	0
(England)	MF	Bill Clitheroe	5	0	5	0	0	0
(England)	FW	Cyril Hemingway	41	12	38	11	3	1
(Scotland)	FW	Dan Kelly	37	9	34	8	3	1
(England)	FW	Jim Mackey	30	3	27	3	3	0
(England)	FW	Harry Waller	30	8	27	7	3	1
(England)	FW	Bill Gardner	26	10	23	8	3	2
(England)	FW	Joe Hill	17	6	17	6	0	0
(Scotland)	FW	Bill Henderson	15	10	15	10	0	0
(Wales)	FW	Alwyn Thomas	10	2	10	2	0	0
(England)	FW	Alec Edmunds	6	0	6	0	0	0
(England)	FW	Eric Humphrey	6	2	6	2	0	0
(England)	FW	Herbert Budd	2	0	2	0	0	0

=== Top scorers ===
Place	Position	Nation	Name	Third Division South	FA Cup	Total
1	FW	(England)	Cyril Hemingway	11	1	12
2	FW	(Scotland)	Bill Henderson	10	0	10
=	FW	(England)	Bill Gardner	8	2	10
4	FW	(Scotland)	Dan Kelly	8	1	9
5	FW	(England)	Harry Waller	7	1	8
6	FW	(England)	Joe Hill	6	0	6
7	MF	(England)	Arthur Smeaton	4	0	4
8	MF	(England)	Jim Mackey	3	0	3
9	MF	(England)	Jim Carrick	2	0	2
=	FW	(England)	Eric Humphrey	2	0	2
=	FW	(Wales)	Alwyn Thomas	2	0	2
12	DF	(England)	Eric Price	1	0	1
=	MF	(England)	Bob Smith	1	0	1
			Own goals	1	0	1
			TOTAL	66	5	71

=== Transfers ===
==== In ====
First appearance	Nat.	Pos.	Name	From
25 August 1928	(Scotland)	DF	Willie Brown	Rochdale
25 August 1928	(England)	MF	Jim Carrick	Accrington Stanley
25 August 1928	(England)	FW	Alec Edmunds	Plymouth Argyle
25 August 1928	(England)	DF	Jack Fowler	Bradford City
25 August 1928	(England)	FW	Bill Gardner	Darlington
25 August 1928	(England)	GK	Harold Gough	Bolton Wanderers
25 August 1928	(England)	FW	Cyril Hemingway	Rotherham United
25 August 1928	(Scotland)	FW	Bill Henderson	Morton
25 August 1928	(Scotland)	FW	Dan Kelly	Derby County
25 August 1928	(Scotland)	MF	Bob Preston	Plymouth Argyle
25 August 1928	(England)	MF	Arthur Smeaton	Halifax Town
1 September 1928	(England)	FW	Eric Price	Northampton Town
8 September 1928	(England)	DF	James Mellon	Darlington
22 September 1928	(England)	MF	Bob Smith	Plymouth Argyle
29 September 1928	(England)	DF	Sid Cann	Unattached
29 September 1928	(England)	MF	Arthur Chamberlain	Notts County
29 September 1928	(England)	FW	Harry Waller	Bury
19 January 1929	(England)	MF	Bill Clitheroe	Leeds United
19 January 1929	(England)	FW	Joe Hill	Leeds United
19 January 1929	(England)	FW	Eric Humphrey	Leeds United

==== Out ====
Last appearance	Nat.	Pos.	Name	To
17 November 1929	(Scotland)	FW	Bill Henderson	Exeter City
17 November 1929	(Scotland)	MF	Bob Preston	Released
5 January 1929	(England)	FW	Eric Price	Released
23 February 1929	(England)	FW	Herbert Budd	Kettering Town
23 February 1929	(England)	MF	Arthur Chamberlain	Worksop Town
9 March 1929	(England)	MF	Charlie Davis	York City
9 March 1929	(England)	DF	Jack Price	Released
29 March 1929	(Scotland)	DF	Willie Brown	Dundalk
13 April 1929	(England)	FW	Bill Gardner	York City
27 April 1929	(England)	FW	Cyril Hemingway	Exeter City
27 April 1929	(England)	FW	Jim Mackey	Dartford
27 April 1929	(England)	DF	James Mellon	Jarrow
27 April 1929	(Wales)	FW	Alwyn Thomas	Exeter City
4 May 1929	(England)	MF	Jim Carrick	Accrington Stanley
4 May 1929	(England)	FW	Alec Edmunds	Released
4 May 1929	(England)	FW	Eric Humphrey	Released
4 May 1929	(England)	MF	Arthur Smeaton	Luton Town
