= 1937–38 Chester F.C. season =

Chester
1937–38 season
- Manager: Alex Raisbeck
- Stadium: Sealand Road
- Football League Third Division North: 9th
- FA Cup: Third round
- Welsh Cup: Quartherfinal
- Top goalscorer: League: Charlie Sargeant (16); All: Charlie Sargeant (19)
- Highest home attendance: 10,892 vs Wrexham (15 April)
- Lowest home attendance: 1,940 vs Accrington Stanley (7 May)
- Average home league attendance: 5,417; 12th in division

The 1937–38 season was the seventh season of competitive association football in the Football League played by Chester, an English club based in Chester, Cheshire.

It was the club's seventh consecutive season in the Third Division North since the election to the Football League. Alongside competing in the league, the club also participated in the FA Cup and the Welsh Cup.

== Football League ==
Pos	Team	Pld	HW	HD	HL	HGF	HGA	AW	AD	AL	AGF	AGA	GAv	Pts
7	Lincoln City	42	14	3	4	48	17	5	5	11	18	33	1.320	46
8	Crewe Alexandra	42	14	3	4	47	17	4	6	11	24	36	1.340	45
9	Chester	42	13	4	4	54	31	3	8	10	23	41	1.069	44
10	Wrexham	42	14	4	3	37	15	2	7	12	21	48	0.921	43
11	York City	42	11	4	6	40	25	5	6	10	30	43	1.029	42

Source: rsssf.com

=== Results summary ===
Overall								Home						Away					
Pld	W	D	L	GF	GA	GAv	Pts	W	D	L	GF	GA	Pts	W	D	L	GF	GA	Pts
42	16	12	14	77	72	1.069	44	13	4	4	54	31	30	3	8	10	23	41	14

Source: rsssf.com

=== Results by matchday ===
Round	1	2	3	4	5	6	7	8	9	10	11	12	13	14	15	16	17	18	19	20	21	22	23	24	25	26	27	28	29	30	31	32	33	34	35	36	37	38	39	40	41	42
Result	D	W	D	W	W	D	W	D	L	W	W	D	D	L	L	D	W	L	W	L	L	D	D	L	W	D	W	L	W	D	L	L	W	L	W	W	D	L	L	L	W	W
Position	11	3	5	5	3	5	3	3	5	3	3	2	4	5	6	7	7	7	6	8	8	8	9	10	10	10	9	10	9	8	10	10	10	10	9	9	10	10	10	11	11	9

Source: Statto.com
W = Win; D = Draw; L = Loss

=== Matches ===
Date	Opponents	Venue	Result	Score	Scorers	Attendance
28 August	Halifax Town	H	D	1–1	Wrightson	8,328
2 September	Carlisle United	A	W	3–1	Sargeant, Wrightson (2)	11,377
4 September	Tranmere Rovers	A	D	0–0		14,618
8 September	Carlisle United	H	W	1–0	Chambers	5,372
11 September	York City	H	W	4–3	Wrightson (2), Smith, Horsman	7,284
18 September	Bradford City	A	D	2–2	Wrightson (2)	6,010
25 September	Southport	H	W	2–1	Gale, Sargeant (pen.)	7,401
28 September	Accrington Stanley	A	D	0–0		6,442
2 October	Doncaster Rovers	A	L	1–2	Chambers	16,391
9 October	Rochdale	H	W	4–1	Sargeant (2), Wrightson, Sanders	5,913
16 October	Hartlepools United	A	W	1–0	Wrightson	5,955
23 October	Lincoln City	H	D	1–1	Wrightson	6,507
30 October	Hull City	A	D	2–2	McCreary, Wrightson	11,383
6 November	New Brighton	H	L	1–2	McCreary	6,924
13 November	Gateshead	A	L	1–3	Wrightson	13,170
20 November	Oldham Athletic	H	D	3–3	Wrightson, Horsman, Gale	6,354
4 December	Port Vale	H	W	7–2	Horsman, Howarth, Chambers, Sargeant, Sanders (2), Johnson (o.g.)	3,849
11 December	Oldham Athletic	A	L	2–3	Smith, Sanders	5,283
18 December	Barrow	H	W	3–1	Sanders (2), Gale	3,201
25 December	Rotherham United	H	L	2–3	Chambers, Horsman	6,105
27 December	Rotherham United	A	L	1–4	Wrightson (pen.)	11,394
1 January	Halifax Town	A	D	1–1	Gale	6,594
15 January	Tranmere Rovers	H	D	1–1	Smith	5,043
26 January	York City	A	L	0–4		3,380
29 January	Bradford City	H	W	3–1	Chambers, Sargeant, Roberts	3,320
5 February	Southport	A	D	2–2	Sargeant, Chambers	5,198
12 February	Doncaster Rovers	H	W	4–0	Sanders, Sargeant (3, 1pen.)	5,188
19 February	Rochdale	A	L	0–4		5,728
26 February	Hartlepools United	H	W	6–0	Sargeant (4, 1pen.), Sanders, Roberts	3,723
5 March	Lincoln City	A	D	1–1	Sargeant	10,157
12 March	Hull City	H	L	1–3	Sargeant	6,864
19 March	New Brighton	A	L	0–4		4,629
26 March	Gateshead	H	W	2–1	Chambers (2, 1pen.)	3,154
6 April	Crewe Alexandra	A	L	0–1		3,312
9 April	Darlington	H	W	3–2	Roberts, Gale (2)	3,024
15 April	Wrexham	H	W	2–1	Cresswell, Gale	10,892
16 April	Port Vale	A	D	2–2	Gale (2)	6,695
18 April	Wrexham	A	L	1–3	Gale	11,480
23 April	Crewe Alexandra	H	L	0–3		3,379
27 April	Darlington	A	L	1–2	Walters	4,359
30 April	Barrow	A	W	2–0	Trevis, Sanders	3,324
7 May	Accrington Stanley	H	W	3–1	Gale, Sanders, Chambers	1,940

== FA Cup ==
Chester along with Millwall and Notts County were given a bye to the Third round.

Round	Date	Opponents	Venue	Result	Score	Scorers	Attendance
Third round	8 January	Leeds United (1)	A	L	1–3	Gale	9,800

== Welsh Cup ==
Round	Date	Opponents	Venue	Result	Score	Scorers	Attendance
Seventh round	23 February	New Brighton (3N)	H	W	5–1	Sanders (2) Sargeant (3)	1,081
Quarterfinal	9 March	Shrewsbury Town (ML)	H	D	0–0		3,600
Quarterfinal replay	2 April	Shrewsbury Town (ML)	A	L	1–2	Chambers	8,000

== Season statistics ==
Nat	Player	Total		League		FA Cup		Welsh Cup	
Nat	Player	A	G	A	G	A	G	A	G
Goalkeepers
(Wales)	Bert Gray	35	–	32	–	1	–	2	–
	Eric Mansley	5	–	4	–	–	–	1	–
(Scotland)	Robert Middleton	6	–	6	–	–	–	–	–
Field players
	Tom Alderson	5	–	5	–	–	–	–	–
	David Beynon	2	–	1	–	–	–	1	–
(England)	Bill Chambers	28	9	24	9	1	–	3	–
	Ted Common	45	–	41	–	1	–	3	–
(England)	Frank Cresswell	5	1	5	1	–	–	–	–
	George Deakin	1	–	1	–	–	–	–	–
(England)	Robert Done	40	–	37	–	1	–	2	–
	John Edwards	1	–	1	–	–	–	–	–
(England)	Tom Feeney	5	–	5	–	–	–	–	–
(England)	Arthur Gale	18	12	16	11	1	1	1	–
	Ernie Hall	4	–	4	–	–	–	–	–
(England)	Bill Horsman	44	4	40	4	1	–	3	–
	Harold Howarth	44	1	40	1	1	–	3	–
	John Lloyd	1	–	1	–	–	–	–	–
	Bernard McCarthy	1	–	1	–	–	–	–	–
(Wales)	Pat McCarthy	2	–	2	–	–	–	–	–
	John McCreary	40	3	36	2	1	–	3	1
(England)	Syd Roberts	17	3	17	3	–	–	–	–
	Bob Sanders	19	12	16	10	–	–	3	2
	Charlie Sargeant	29	19	26	16	1	–	2	3
(England)	Clement Smith	29	3	26	3	1	–	2	–
(England)	Bos Trevis	19	1	16	1	–	–	3	–
	John Turner	1	–	1	–	–	–	–	–
(Wales)	Trevor Walters	38	1	36	1	1	–	1	–
(England)	Arthur Wilson	1	–	1	–	–	–	–	–
(England)	Paddy Wrightson	21	14	21	14	–	–	–	–
	Own goals	–	1	–	1	–	–	–	–
	Total	46	84	42	77	1	1	3	6
