= 1936–37 Chester F.C. season =

Chester
1936–37 season
- Manager: Alex Raisbeck
- Stadium: Sealand Road
- Football League Third Division North: 3rd
- FA Cup: Fourth round
- Welsh Cup: Quarter-final
- Top goalscorer: League: Paddy Wrightson (32); All: Paddy Wrightson (33)
- Highest home attendance: 16,004 vs Wrexham (29 August)
- Lowest home attendance: 1,765 vs Gateshead (21 April)
- Average home league attendance: 7,828; 2nd in division
Home colours

The 1936–37 season was the sixth season of competitive association football in the Football League played by Chester, an English club based in Chester, Cheshire.

It was the club's sixth consecutive season in the Third Division North since the election to the Football League. Alongside competing in the league, the club also participated in the FA Cup and the Welsh Cup.

== Football League ==
Pos	Team	Pld	W	D	L	GF	GA	GAv	Pts	Promotion or relegation
1	Stockport County (C, P)	42	23	14	5	84	39	2.154	60	Promotion to the Second Division
2	Lincoln City	42	25	7	10	103	57	1.807	57	
3	Chester	42	22	9	11	87	57	1.526	53	
4	Oldham Athletic	42	20	11	11	77	59	1.305	51	
5	Hull City	42	17	12	13	68	69	0.986	46	

Source: rsssf.com
Rules for classification: 1) Points; 2) Goal average; 3) Goals scored
(C) Champions; (P) Promoted

=== Results summary ===
Overall								Home						Away					
Pld	W	D	L	GF	GA	GAv	Pts	W	D	L	GF	GA	Pts	W	D	L	GF	GA	Pts
42	22	9	11	87	57	1.526	53	15	5	1	68	21	35	7	4	10	19	36	18

Source: rsssf.com

=== Results by matchday ===
Round	1	2	3	4	5	6	7	8	9	10	11	12	13	14	15	16	17	18	19	20	21	22	23	24	25	26	27	28	29	30	31	32	33	34	35	36	37	38	39	40	41	42
Result	W	W	W	D	W	W	W	W	W	L	W	D	W	L	W	L	D	L	W	L	D	W	L	L	D	W	W	D	W	W	W	D	W	L	L	D	W	L	W	L	W	D
Position	3	1	1	1	1	1	1	1	1	1	1	1	1	1	1	1	1	1	1	1	1	1	1	1	1	1	1	1	1	1	1	2	1	3	3	3	3	3	3	3	3	3

Source: Statto.com
W = Win; D = Draw; L = Loss

=== Matches ===
Date	Opponents	Venue	Result	Score	Scorers	Attendance
29 August	Wrexham	H	W	4–1	Wrightson, Chambers, Horsman (2)	16,004
2 September	Crewe Alexandra	H	W	5–0	Wrightson (2), Chambers (3)	8,531
5 September	Rochdale	A	W	1–0	Horsman	5,806
7 September	Crewe Alexandra	A	D	1–1	Sargeant	7,389
12 September	Barrow	H	W	6–0	Wrightson (2), Horsman (2), Trevis, Sargeant	6,104
16 September	Tranmere Rovers	H	W	5–2	Sargeant, Wrightson (2), Alderson, Chambers (pen.)	12,579
19 September	York City	A	W	2–0	Wrightson, Sargeant	4,917
26 September	Carlisle United	H	W	4–0	Horsman, Wrightson (3)	8,932
3 October	Hartlepools United	A	W	1–0	Sargeant	12,220
10 October	Southport	H	L	2–3	Sargeant, Wrightson	8,639
17 October	Darlington	H	W	2–1	Horsman, Wrightson	6,762
24 October	Gateshead	A	D	1–1	Wrightson	3,838
31 October	Hull City	H	W	3–1	Wrightson (2), Dimbledy (o.g.)	10,235
7 November	New Brighton	A	L	0–1		8,435
14 November	Lincoln City	H	W	7–3	Gurry (3), Wrightson (3), Sargeant	8,343
21 November	Accrington Stanley	A	L	1–2	Wrightson	4,727
28 November	Port Vale	H	D	0–0		7,616
5 December	Port Vale	A	L	0–4		12,950
12 December	Rotherham United	H	W	2–1	Wrightson, Sanders	4,076
19 December	Stockport County	A	L	0–4		6,953
25 December	Halifax Town	H	D	1–1	Wrightson	11,241
26 December	Wrexham	A	W	2–1	Wrightson, Sanders	29,261
28 December	Halifax Town	A	L	0–1		6,290
1 January	Tranmere Rovers	A	L	0–5		13,051
2 January	Rochdale	H	D	2–2	Wrightson, Davies	4,514
9 January	Barrow	A	W	2–1	Wrightson, Sargeant	4,103
23 January	York City	H	W	3–1	Alderson, Legge (o.g.), Sargeant	4,235
4 February	Carlisle United	A	D	1–1	Alderson	3,362
6 February	Hartlepools United	H	W	3–0	Alderson, Wrightson, Gale	5,444
13 February	Southport	A	W	2–1	Horsman, Prout	6,953
20 February	Darlington	A	W	3–1	Wrightson (2), Gale	6,646
6 March	Hull City	A	D	1–1	Sargeant	7,966
13 March	New Brighton	H	W	4–1	Wrightson (2), Gale, Sargeant	5,755
20 March	Lincoln City	A	L	0–3		11,498
26 March	Mansfield Town	A	L	0–5		6,920
27 March	Accrington Stanley	H	D	1–1	Chambers	6,197
29 March	Mansfield Town	H	W	5–1	Horsman (2), Gale, Sargeant, Chambers	9,448
3 April	Oldham Athletic	A	L	0–1		9,899
14 April	Oldham Athletic	H	W	2–1	Gale, Hilton (o.g.)	2,707
17 April	Rotherham United	A	L	1–2	Chambers	4,054
21 April	Gateshead	H	W	6–0	Sargeant (3), Wrightson (2), Chambers	1,765
24 April	Stockport County	H	D	1–1	Sargeant	15,255

== FA Cup ==
Chester along with Port Vale and Luton Town were given a bye to the Third round.

Round	Date	Opponents	Venue	Result	Score	Scorers	Attendance
Third round	16 January	Doncaster Rovers (2)	H	W	4–0	Gale, Alderson, Sargeant, Wrightson	9,800
Fourth round	30 January	Coventry City (2)	A	L	0–2		21,605

== Welsh Cup ==
Round	Date	Opponents	Venue	Result	Score	Scorers	Attendance
Seventh round	24 February	Southport (3N)	H	W	4–1	Chambers (2), Wrightson, Sargeant	
Quarterfinal	17 March	Crewe Alexandra (3N)	A	L	1–2	Chambers	1,040

== Season statistics ==
Nat	Player	Total		League		FA Cup		Welsh Cup	
Nat	Player	A	G	A	G	A	G	A	G
Goalkeepers
(Wales)	Bert Gray	44	–	41	–	2	–	1	–
	Eric Mansley	1	–	1	–	–	–	–	–
(Scotland)	Robert Middleton	1	–	–	–	–	–	1	–
Field players
	Tom Alderson	43	5	39	4	2	1	2	–
(England)	Ted Anderson	7	–	7	–	–	–	–	–
(England)	Bill Chambers	26	12	24	9	–	–	2	3
	Ted Common	46	–	42	–	2	–	2	–
	Jack Davies	18	1	16	1	–	–	2	–
(England)	Arthur Gale	20	6	18	5	2	1	–	–
(England)	Jack Gurry	7	3	6	3	–	–	1	–
	Ernie Hall	43	–	39	–	2	–	2	–
(England)	Bill Horsman	40	10	36	10	2	–	2	–
	Harold Howarth	44	–	40	–	2	–	2	–
	Peter Percival	2	–	2	–	–	–	–	–
	John Pitcairn	16	–	14	–	2	–	–	–
	Stan Prout	2	1	2	1	–	–	–	–
	Bob Sanders	4	2	4	2	–	–	–	–
	Charlie Sargeant	42	18	38	16	2	1	2	1
(England)	Bos Trevis	10	1	10	1	–	–	–	–
	John Turner	3	–	3	–	–	–	–	–
(England)	Arthur Wilson	46	–	42	–	2	–	2	–
(England)	Paddy Wrightson	41	34	38	32	2	1	1	1
	Own goals	–	3	–	3	–	–	–	–
	Total	46	96	42	87	2	4	2	5
