= 1938–39 Chester F.C. season =

Chester
1938–39 season
- Manager: Frank Brown
- Stadium: Sealand Road
- Football League Third Division North: 6th
- FA Cup: Fourth round
- Welsh Cup: Semifinal
- Top goalscorer: League: Bill Pendergast (27); All: Bill Pendergast (30)
- Highest home attendance: 10,364 vs Wrexham (25 February)
- Lowest home attendance: 1,727 vs Southport (26 April)
- Average home league attendance: 5,963; 10th in division
Home colours

The 1938–39 season was the eighth season of competitive association football in the Football League played by Chester, an English club based in Chester, Cheshire.

It was the club's eighth consecutive season in the Third Division North since the election to the Football League. Alongside competing in the league, the club also participated in the FA Cup and the Welsh Cup.

== Football League ==
Pos	Team	Pld	W	D	L	GF	GA	GAv	Pts
4	Southport	42	20	10	12	75	54	1.389	50
5	Oldham Athletic	42	22	5	15	76	59	1.288	49
6	Chester	42	20	9	13	88	70	1.257	49
7	Hull City	42	18	10	14	83	74	1.122	46
8	Crewe Alexandra	42	19	6	17	82	70	1.171	44

Source: rsssf.com

=== Results summary ===
Overall								Home						Away					
Pld	W	D	L	GF	GA	GAv	Pts	W	D	L	GF	GA	Pts	W	D	L	GF	GA	Pts
42	20	9	13	88	70	1.257	49	12	5	4	54	31	29	8	4	9	34	39	20

Source: rsssf.com

=== Results by matchday ===
Round	1	2	3	4	5	6	7	8	9	10	11	12	13	14	15	16	17	18	19	20	21	22	23	24	25	26	27	28	29	30	31	32	33	34	35	36	37	38	39	40	41	42
Result	D	L	W	L	W	W	W	W	W	D	L	W	L	L	L	W	D	L	W	W	D	D	L	W	D	W	L	W	W	D	D	L	L	L	L	W	W	W	D	W	W	W
Position	11	16	12	12	11	13	11	7	5	5	6	5	6	10	11	8	9	12	10	8	6	9	12	9	10	8	8	8	8	8	8	8	8	9	10	10	9	7	7	7	16	6

Source: Statto.com
W = Win; D = Draw; L = Loss

=== Matches ===
Date	Opponents	Venue	Result	Score	Scorers	Attendance
27 August	Hull City	H	D	1–1	Howarth (pen.)	8,986
31 August	New Brighton	H	L	1–3	Roberts	6,306
3 September	Lincoln City	A	W	3–0	Pendergast, Horsman, Howarth	4,544
5 September	Bradford City	A	L	0–1		6,229
10 September	Stockport County	H	W	4–3	Pendergast (3), Keeley	9,779
17 September	Accrington Stanley	A	W	3–2	Keeley, Pendergast, Sanders	4,728
24 September	Barnsley	H	W	2–1	Horsman, Pendergast	9,479
1 October	Oldham Athletic	A	W	3–1	Pendergast (2), Rogers	12,144
8 October	Halifax Town	H	W	5–1	Keeley (3), Pendergast, Horsman (pen.)	6,792
15 October	Gateshead	H	D	2–2	Pendergast, McGough	9,033
22 October	Wrexham	A	L	2–3	Pendergast, Keeley	15,785
29 October	York City	H	W	5–1	Wass (o.g.), Pendergast, Sanders (2), Keeley	7,315
5 November	Rochdale	A	L	2–5	Howarth, Pendergast	6,732
12 November	Rotherham United	H	L	1–4	Pendergast	7,082
19 November	Doncaster Rovers	A	L	1–4	Pendergast	14,675
3 December	Crewe Alexandra	A	W	2–0	Keeley, Pendergast	7,431
17 December	Darlington	A	D	3–3	Keeley, McGough (2)	2,647
24 December	Hull City	A	L	0–3		5,911
26 December	Hartlepools United	A	W	5–2	Pendergast (2), Horsman (2), Keeley	5,177
27 December	Hartlepools United	H	W	8–2	Keeley (2), Pendergast (2, 1pen.), Sanders (3), Gregg (pen.)	7,748
31 December	Lincoln City	H	D	0–0		6,079
14 January	Stockport County	A	D	0–0		10,781
28 January	Barnsley	A	L	0–3		13,161
4 February	Oldham Athletic	H	W	4–2	Pendergast, Roberts, Keeley, Sanders	5,983
11 February	Halifax Town	A	D	1–1	Pendergast	5,217
15 February	Accrington Stanley	H	W	1–0	McGough	1,728
18 February	Gateshead	A	L	0–3		4,492
25 February	Wrexham	H	W	4–2	Keeley (2), Sanders, Pendergast	10,364
1 March	Carlisle United	H	W	6–1	Sanders (3), Pendergast (2), Keeley	1,735
4 March	York City	A	D	2–2	Pendergast, Horsman	4,108
11 March	Rochdale	H	D	0–0		4,375
18 March	Rotherham United	A	L	0–2		5,317
25 March	Doncaster Rovers	H	L	0–4		4,982
1 April	Southport	A	L	0–2		4,257
7 April	Barrow	H	L	1–2	Howarth	6,057
8 April	Crewe Alexandra	H	W	4–0	Horsman, Gregg (pen.), Worswick (2)	4,235
10 April	Barrow	A	W	1–0	Warburton	8,977
15 April	Carlisle United	A	W	3–1	Horsman (3)	2,601
22 April	Darlington	H	D	0–0		2,406
26 April	Southport	H	W	2–0	Worswick, Pendergast	1,727
29 April	New Brighton	A	W	3–1	Howarth, Bulloch (o.g.), Keeley	2,553
6 May	Bradford City	H	W	3–2	Warburton, Worswick, Keeley	3,033

== FA Cup ==
Round	Date	Opponents	Venue	Result	Score	Scorers	Attendance
First round	26 November	Bradford City (3N)	H	W	3–1	Horsman, Pendergast, Hinsley (o.g.)	6,672
Second round	10 December	Hull City (3N)	H	D	2–2	Horsman, Gregg (pen.)	9,905
Second round replay	15 December	Hull City (3N)	A	W	1–0	Horsman	8,184
Third round	7 January	Coventry City (2)	H	W	1–0	Pendergast	11,248
Fourth round	21 January	Sheffield Wednesday (2)	A	D	1–1	Sanders	29,237
Fourth round replay	25 January	Sheffield Wednesday (2)	H	D	1–1	Hanford (o.g.)	18,816
Fourth round replay	25 January	Sheffield Wednesday (2)	N	D	0–2		15,321

== Welsh Cup ==
Round	Date	Opponents	Venue	Result	Score	Scorers	Attendance
Sixth round	8 February	Rhyl Athletic (CCL)	H	W	4–0	Horsman, Roberts, Keeley, Pendergast	1,558
Semifinal	22 March	South Liverpool (LC)	N	L	2–5	Horsman, Keeley	

Chester get a bye in the seventh round.

== Season statistics ==
Nat	Player	Total		League		FA Cup		Welsh Cup	
Nat	Player	A	G	A	G	A	G	A	G
Goalkeepers
	Alf Hobson	17	–	17	–	–	–	–	–
	Eric Mansley	4	–	4	–	–	–	–	–
	Cliff Owen	30	–	21	–	7	–	2	–
Field players
	David Beynon	12	–	12	–	–	–	1	–
	Reg Butcher	31	–	23	–	7	–	1	–
	Ted Common	31	–	23	–	7	–	1	–
(Northern Ireland)	Jackie Coulter	4	–	4	–	–	–	–	–
	Stan Duff	2	–	2	–	–	–	–	–
(England)	Arthur Gale	1	–	1	–	–	–	–	–
	Willis Gregg	38	3	29	2	7	1	2	–
	George Griffiths	7	–	6	–	–	–	1	–
(England)	Bill Horsman	51	15	41	10	7	3	2	2
	Harold Howarth	46	5	38	5	7	–	1	–
	Arthur Keeley	45	20	36	18	7	–	2	2
	John McCreary	22	–	20	–	–	–	2	–
	Joe McGough	41	4	34	4	7	–	–	–
(Wales)	Bill Pendergast	43	30	34	27	7	2	2	1
(England)	Syd Roberts	14	3	12	2	–	–	2	1
	Chris Robertson	13	–	13	–	–	–	–	–
	Joe Rogers	11	1	8	1	3	–	–	–
	Albert Ross	1	–	1	–	–	–	–	–
	Bob Sanders	22	12	18	11	4	1	–	–
(England)	Bos Trevis	3	–	3	–	–	–	–	–
(Wales)	Trevor Walters	49	–	41	–	7	–	1	–
	Albert Watford	1	–	1	–	–	–	–	–
(England)	George Warburton	12	2	10	2	–	–	2	–
	Tommy White	1	–	1	–	–	–	–	–
	Randall Worswick	8	4	8	4	–	–	–	–
(England)	Paddy Wrightson	1	–	1	–	–	–	–	–
	Own goals	–	4	–	2	–	2	–	–
	Total	51	103	42	88	7	9	2	6
