= 1925–26 Torquay United F.C. season =

Torquay United
1925–26 season
- Chairman: Charles Hore
- Manager: Percy Mackrill
- Southern League Western Section: 6th
- Western League Professional Section: 3rd
- FA Cup: First round
- Devon Professional Cup: Semi-final
- Top goalscorer: League: George Appleyard (15); All: George Appleyard (29)
Home colours

The 1925–26 Torquay United F.C. season was Torquay United's fifth season in competitive football and their fourth season in the Southern League. The season runs from 1 July 1925 to 30 June 1926.

== Overview ==
Torquay United's fourth season in the Southern League saw them face a much depleted fixture list with the Western Section reduced to only fourteen teams due to the departure of six of the Welsh sides. As a result, the remaining English teams joined to form the Professional Section of the Western League to provide themselves with additional fixtures. This gave the Magpies an extra eighteen games to play on top of their Southern League commitments.

Under new player-manager Percy Mackrill, Torquay made a hesitant start to their Southern League campaign and were without a win in their first six matches. However, the Plainmoor faithful were rewarded for their patience in December when the Magpies scored a total of twelve goals in their Christmas and Boxing Day fixtures against Taunton United and Bath City. Torquay eventually finished 6th in the Southern League which, even with just fourteen teams competing, was certainly an improvement on the previous season. Torquay also made a good showing in the Western League, finishing in 3rd place.

Much of the Torquay's success during the season was due to the goalscoring of new forward George Appleyard, signed from local rivals Exeter City. Effortlessly filling the boots of the recently departed Billy Kellock, Appleyard scored an impressive 29 goals in all competitions. He made a particular impression in the FA Cup, scoring in all five qualifying rounds and getting Torquay to the first round proper for the very first time. Their reward was a visit from high-flying Third Division South side Reading. 6,000 supporters at Plainmoor witnessed Torquay take a first half lead over their League opponents before Reading equalised through a penalty which forced a replay at Elm Park. A late equalising goal from George Appleyard in that match saw the fixture taken to a second replay, to be held at Bristol City's Ashton Gate ground. However, it was to be third time unlucky for the Magpies as the League side eventually emerged with a 2–0 victory.

It was an outstanding performance by Torquay over the eventual Third Division South champions and certainly strengthened their case for election to the Football League. However, for the time being at least, the Magpies made no attempt to enter the Third Division South at the end of the season and instead looked forward to another Southern League campaign.

== League statistics ==
=== Southern League Western Section ===
Pos	Team	Pld	W	D	L	GF	GA	GR	Pts	Result (Note: Number of goals for and/or against is inaccurate.)
4	Swindon Town II	26	13	4	9	57	40	1.425	30	
5	Ebbw Vale	26	13	3	10	60	46	1.304	29	
6	Torquay United	26	12	5	9	59	46	1.283	29	
7	Yeovil & Petters United	26	9	8	9	43	48	0.896	26	
8	Mid Rhondda United	26	12	1	13	47	49	0.959	25	

Rules for classification: The system of using goal average to separate two teams tied on points was used until the 1976–77 season. The points system: 2 points for a win, 1 point for a draw and 0 points for losing.

=== Western League Professional Section ===
Pos	Team	Pld	W	D	L	GF	GA	GR	Pts
1	Bristol City Reserves	18	10	7	1	58	19	3.053	27
2	Bristol Rovers Reserves	18	11	2	5	53	36	1.472	24
3	Torquay United	18	9	4	5	28	22	1.273	22
4	Yeovil and Petters United	18	7	7	4	33	27	1.222	21
5	Swindon Town Reserves	18	6	8	4	32	33	0.970	20
6	Weymouth	18	7	4	7	37	45	0.822	18
7	Plymouth Argyle Reserves	18	6	5	7	31	25	1.240	17
8	Exeter City Reserves	18	6	4	8	33	41	0.805	16
9	Taunton United	18	3	3	12	18	45	0.400	9
10	Bath City Reserves	18	1	4	13	20	50	0.400	6

== Results ==
=== Southern League Western Section ===
29 Aug 1925	Torquay United	1 – 2	Plymouth Argyle Reserves	Plainmoor
	Mackrill (pen.)		Goal

5 Sep 1925	Torquay United	0 – 1	Exeter City Reserves	Plainmoor
			Goal

12 Sep 1925	Bristol Rovers Reserves	1 – 1	Torquay United	Eastville Stadium
	Goal		Appleyard

26 Sep 1925	Exeter City Reserves	2 – 2	Torquay United	St James Park
	Goal		Mackrill; Hughes

21 Nov 1925	Swindon Town Reserves	2 – 2	Torquay United	County Ground
	Goal		Marlow; Chambers

5 Dec 1925	Ebbw Vale	7 – 1	Torquay United	Welfare Ground
	Goal		Appleyard

12 Dec 1925	Torquay United	2 – 1	Mid Rhondda United	Plainmoor
	Bell; Chambers		Goal

25 Dec 1925	Torquay United	5 – 0	Taunton United	Plainmoor
	Leslie (pen.); Appleyard; Marlow; Pither

26 Dec 1925	Torquay United	7 – 2	Bath City	Plainmoor
	Appleyard; Bell; Chambers		Goal

9 Jan 1926	Torquay United	1 – 1	Yeovil & Petters United	Plainmoor
	Appleyard		Goal

23 Jan 1926	Barry	2 – 2	Torquay United	Jenner Park
	Goal		Pither; Garratt

27 Jan 1926	Bristol City Reserves	3 – 1	Torquay United	Ashton Gate
	Goal		Appleyard

6 Feb 1926	Torquay United	3 – 0	Barry	Plainmoor
	Appleyard; Pither; Chambers

13 Feb 1926	Weymouth	3 – 1	Torquay United	Recreation Ground
	Dale; Bell; Caswell		Appleyard

20 Feb 1926	Torquay United	3 – 1	Swindon Town Reserves	Plainmoor
	Chambers; Hughes (pen.)		Goal

27 Feb 1926	Torquay United	4 – 1	Weymouth	Plainmoor
	Leslie (pen.) (pen.); Bell; Bolt		Bell

6 Mar 1926	Yeovil & Petters United	1 – 0	Torquay United	Pen Mill Athletic Ground
	Goal

13 Mar 1926	Torquay United	6 – 0	Pontypridd	Plainmoor
	Hughes (o.g.) (o.g.); Morgan; Bell

20 Mar 1926	Mid Rhondda United	1 – 2	Torquay United	Mid Rhondda Ground
	Goal		Appleyard

27 Mar 1926	Torquay United	3 – 2	Ebbw Vale	Plainmoor
	Marlow (o.g.); Morgan		Goal

2 Apr 1926	Taunton United	1 – 5	Torquay United	Taunton
	Goal		Marlow; Appleyard; Bell; Pither

3 Apr 1926	Torquay United	1 – 3	Bristol Rovers Reserves	Plainmoor
	Marlow		Goal

5 Apr 1926	Bath City	1 – 2	Torquay United	Belvoir
	Goal		Appleyard; Bell

6 Apr 1926	Pontypridd	6 – 3	Torquay United	Pontypridd
	Goal		Hughes (pen.) (pen.); Pither

10 Apr 1926	Torquay United	1 – 0	Bristol City Reserves	Plainmoor
	Marlow

17 Apr 1926	Plymouth Argyle Reserves	2 – 0	Torquay United	Home Park
	Goal

=== Western League Professional Section ===
31 Aug 1925	Plymouth Argyle Reserves	2 – 3	Torquay United	Home Park
	Goal		Marlow; Pither

21 Sep 1925	Torquay United	0 – 0	Swindon Town Reserves	Plainmoor

10 Oct 1925	Yeovil & Petters United	0 – 0	Torquay United	Pen Mill Athletic Ground

24 Oct 1925	Torquay United	4 – 2	Bath City	Plainmoor
	Appleyard; Vallis; Marlow		Goal

28 Oct 1925	Torquay United	1 – 2	Taunton United	Plainmoor
	Vallis		Goal

17 Dec 1925	Torquay United	0 – 2	Yeovil & Petters United	Plainmoor
			Goal

6 Jan 1926	Weymouth	3 – 1	Torquay United	Recreation Ground
	Caswell; Bown		Chambers

13 Jan 1926	Torquay United	2 – 0	Bristol Rovers Reserves	Plainmoor
	Bell; Leslie (pen.)

16 Jan 1926	Exeter City Reserves	1 – 2	Torquay United	St James Park
	Goal		Pither; Bell

30 Jan 1926	Torquay United	4 – 2	Bristol City Reserves	Plainmoor
	Hughes (pen.) (pen.); Marlow; Bell		Goal

4 Feb 1926	Taunton United	0 – 1	Torquay United	Taunton
			Appleyard

10 Mar 1926	Bristol City Reserves	0 – 0	Torquay United	Ashton Gate

17 Mar 1926	Torquay United	3 – 1	Weymouth	Plainmoor
	Bell; Marlow		Bell

25 Mar 1926	Bath City	0 – 2	Torquay United	Belvoir
			Appleyard; Marlow

14 Apr 1926	Torquay United	3 – 1	Exeter City Reserves	Plainmoor
	Appleyard		Goal

21 Apr 1926	Torquay United	1 – 1	Plymouth Argyle Reserves	Plainmoor
	Marlow		Goal

24 Apr 1926	Bristol Rovers Reserves	3 – 0	Torquay United	Eastville Stadium
	Goal

28 Apr 1926	Swindon Town Reserves	1 – 0	Torquay United	County Ground
	Goal

=== FA Cup ===
19 Sep 1925 Preliminary round	Torquay United	5 – 1	Green Waves	Plainmoor
	Pither; Marlow; Appleyard		Goal

3 Oct 1925 First round qualifying	Taunton United	1 – 2	Torquay United	Taunton
	Goal		Vallis; Appleyard

17 Oct 1925 Second round qualifying	Kingswood	2 – 3	Torquay United	Kingswood
	Goal		Vallis; Marlow; Appleyard

31 Oct 1925 Third round qualifying	Mid Rhondda United	1 – 2	Torquay United	Mid Rhondda Ground
	Goal		Appleyard

14 Nov 1925 Fourth round qualifying	Torquay United	3 – 1	Yeovil & Petters United	Plainmoor
	Morgan; Appleyard; Pither		Goal

28 Nov 1925 First round	Torquay United	1 – 1	Reading	Plainmoor
	Vallis		Goal

2 Dec 1925 First round replay	Reading	1 – 1	Torquay United	Elm Park
	Goal		Appleyard

7 Dec 1925 First round 2nd replay	Torquay United	0 – 2	Reading	Ashton Gate
			Goal

=== Devon Professional Cup ===
18 Nov 1925 Semi Final	Torquay United	1 – 2	Plymouth Argyle Reserves	Plainmoor
	Pither		Goal
