= 1926–27 Torquay United F.C. season =

Torquay United
1926–27 season
- Chairman: Charles Hore
- Manager: Percy Mackrill
- Southern League Western Section: 1st Promoted to Third Division South
- Western League Professional Section: 2nd
- FA Cup: First Round
- Devon Professional Trophy: Semi-final
- Top goalscorer: League: Lew Griffiths (15); All: Lew Griffiths & Len Marlow (25)
Home colours

The 1926–27 Torquay United F.C. season was Torquay United's sixth season in competitive football and their fifth season in the Southern League. The season ran from 1 July 1926 to 30 June 1927.

== Overview ==
For the second season in succession, Torquay United found themselves competing in both the Southern League and the Western League. With the Professional Section of the Western League now expanded to include twelve teams, United had to play a total of 48 games spread across the two leagues. The Magpies certainly rose to the challenge in both competitions. In the Southern League, Percy Mackrill's men were particularly impressive at Plainmoor where only a shock Boxing Day defeat to Bath City prevented the team from achieving a 100% home record. United also suffered just one home defeat in their Western League campaign, a 2–0 loss to eventual champions Bristol City Reserves. However, in the Southern League, it was the Magpies who prevailed over City's Reserves and Torquay United were crowned winners of the Western Section in April. As Western champions, Torquay met the winners of the Eastern Section, Brighton & Hove Albion Reserves, in the Southern League play-off final. However, United lost the game 4-0 making Brighton's Reserves the overall Southern League champions.

Following an impressive display against Third Division South side Reading in the previous season's FA Cup, Torquay were this season given a bye to the First Round proper. United again gave a good account of themselves against Football League opposition when, after holding Bristol Rovers to a 1–1 draw at Plainmoor, they were unfortunate to be beaten 1–0 in the replay at the Eastville Stadium in a game in which Torquay missed a penalty.

Having enjoyed such a successful season, Torquay United now made a second attempt to gain membership of the Football League. Although they hadn't received a single vote in their previous attempt to enter the Third Division South in 1922, United's bid was now far more credible and was reflected in the votes cast this time around. At the Football League's meeting in London's Connaught Rooms on 30 May, one of the two current League clubs up for re-election, Watford, won a respectable 44 votes, while the other, Aberdare Athletic, found themselves tied with Torquay in second place on 21 votes each. Despite claims by Aberdare's secretary of a biased scrutineer, a second vote went in the Magpies favour with a 26–19 split meaning that Torquay United would now be taking the Welsh team's place in the 1927–28 season of the Third Division South.

After nearly thirty years of organised football and various team mergers and name changes, the town of Torquay finally had a Football League club of its own.

== League statistics ==
=== Southern League Western Section ===
| Pos | Team | Pld | W | D | L | GF | GA | GR | Pts | Qualification |
|---|---|---|---|---|---|---|---|---|---|---|
| 1 | Torquay United | 26 | 17 | 4 | 5 | 63 | 30 | 2.100 | 38 | Elected to the Football League Third Division South |
| 2 | Bristol City II | 26 | 14 | 10 | 2 | 77 | 37 | 2.081 | 38 | |
| 3 | Plymouth Argyle II | 26 | 15 | 4 | 7 | 56 | 38 | 1.474 | 34 | |
| 4 | Ebbw Vale | 26 | 14 | 2 | 10 | 67 | 45 | 1.489 | 30 | |
| 5 | Bristol Rovers II | 26 | 12 | 4 | 10 | 51 | 43 | 1.186 | 28 | |

Rules for classification: The system of using goal average to separate two teams tied on points was used up until the 1976–77 season. The points system: 2 points for a win, 1 point for a draw and 0 points for losing.

=== Western League Professional Section ===
| Pos | Team | Pld | W | D | L | GF | GA | GR | Pts | Result |
|---|---|---|---|---|---|---|---|---|---|---|
| 1 | Bristol City Reserves | 22 | 16 | 2 | 4 | 59 | 32 | 1.844 | 34 | |
| 2 | Torquay United | 22 | 14 | 4 | 4 | 47 | 27 | 1.741 | 32 | Elected to Football League Third Division South |
| 3 | Plymouth Argyle Reserves | 22 | 13 | 1 | 8 | 63 | 37 | 1.703 | 27 | |
| 4 | Lovells Athletic | 22 | 11 | 5 | 6 | 47 | 36 | 1.306 | 27 | |
| 5 | Bristol Rovers Reserves | 22 | 12 | 3 | 7 | 49 | 41 | 1.195 | 27 | |
| 6 | Exeter City Reserves | 22 | 10 | 3 | 9 | 61 | 53 | 1.151 | 23 | |
| 7 | Yeovil and Petters United | 22 | 10 | 1 | 11 | 48 | 44 | 1.091 | 21 | |
| 8 | Swindon Town Reserves | 22 | 9 | 2 | 11 | 41 | 47 | 0.872 | 20 | Left at the end of the season |
| 9 | Bath City Reserves | 22 | 8 | 3 | 11 | 35 | 50 | 0.700 | 19 | |
| 10 | Poole | 22 | 6 | 2 | 14 | 40 | 69 | 0.580 | 14 | Left at the end of the season |
| 11 | Taunton United | 22 | 4 | 3 | 15 | 28 | 55 | 0.509 | 11 | |
| 12 | Weymouth | 22 | 3 | 3 | 16 | 30 | 57 | 0.526 | 9 | |

== Results ==
=== Southern League Western Section ===
| 28 Aug 1926 | Torquay United | 4 – 1 | Taunton United | Plainmoor |
| | Bloxham; Hughes; Daniel; Andrews | | Goal |

| 4 Sep 1926 | Torquay United | 3 – 2 | Weymouth | Plainmoor |
| | Marlow; Pattison; Daniel | | Camp; Caswell |

| 11 Sep 1926 | Taunton United | 1 – 1 | Torquay United | Taunton |
| | Goal | | Andrews |

| 18 Sep 1926 | Torquay United | 4 – 0 | Plymouth Argyle Reserves | Plainmoor |
| | Daniel; Andrews; Marlow |

| 25 Sep 1926 | Torquay United | 2 – 1 | Swindon Town Reserves | Plainmoor |
| | Andrews; Bloxham | | Goal |

| 2 Oct 1926 | Bristol Rovers Reserves | 1 – 0 | Torquay United | Eastville Stadium |
| | Goal |

| 9 Oct 1926 | Torquay United | 4 – 0 | Exeter City Reserves | Plainmoor |
| | Andrews; Daniel |

| 30 Oct 1926 | Exeter City Reserves | 1 – 0 | Torquay United | St James Park |
| | Goal |

| 6 Nov 1926 | Bristol City Reserves | 4 – 2 | Torquay United | Ashton Gate |
| | Goal | | Andrews; Daniel |

| 13 Nov 1926 | Torquay United | 5 – 2 | Ebbw Vale | Plainmoor |
| | Marlow; Andrews; Bloxham; Pattison | | Goal |

| 4 Dec 1926 | Yeovil & Petters United | 2 – 2 | Torquay United | Pen Mill Athletic Ground |
| | Goal | | Marlow; Hughes |

| 11 Dec 1926 | Torquay United | 2 – 0 | Bristol City Reserves | Plainmoor |
| | Marlow |

| 18 Dec 1926 | Plymouth Argyle Reserves | 2 – 2 | Torquay United | Home Park |
| | Goal | | Marlow; Piercey |

| 26 Dec 1926 | Torquay United | 1 – 2 | Bath City | Plainmoor |
| | Morgan | | Goal |

| 8 Jan 1927 | Swindon Town Reserves | 4 – 3 | Torquay United | County Ground |
| | Goal | | Griffiths; Marlow |

| 22 Jan 1927 | Torquay United | 1 – 0 | Bristol Rovers Reserves | Plainmoor |
| | Griffiths |

| 5 Feb 1927 | Torquay United | 3 – 1 | Barry | Plainmoor |
| | Pattison; Griffiths | | Goal |

| 19 Feb 1927 | Torquay United | 5 – 1 | Yeovil & Petters United | Plainmoor |
| | Marlow; Pearcey; Perry | | Goal |

| 4 Mar 1927 | Mid Rhondda United | 0 – 3 | Torquay United | Mid Rhondda Ground |
| | | | Pattison; Marlow; Griffiths |

| 19 Mar 1927 | Weymouth | 0 – 2 | Torquay United | Recreation Ground |
| | | | Griffiths | Attendance: 756 |

| 30 Mar 1927 | Torquay United | 2 – 1 | Newport County Reserves | Plainmoor |
| | Griffiths; Pattison | | Goal |

| 2 Apr 1927 | Torquay United | 3 – 0 | Mid Rhondda United | Plainmoor |
| | Griffiths; Andrews; Pattison |

| 8 Apr 1927 | Ebbw Vale | 1 – 2 | Torquay United | Welfare Ground |
| | Goal | | Griffiths (o.g.) |

| 9 Apr 1927 | Barry | 2 – 4 | Torquay United | Jenner Park |
| | Goal | | Griffiths; Pattison; Andrews |

| 18 Apr 1927 | Bath City | 0 – 0 | Torquay United | Belvoir |

| 30 Apr 1927 | Newport County Reserves | 1 – 3 | Torquay United | Somerton Park |
| | Goal | | Andrews; Griffiths |

==== Southern League play-off final ====
| 5 Oct 1927 | Brighton & Hove Albion Reserves | 4 – 0 | Torquay United Reserves | Goldstone Ground |
| | Oswald; Ison; Jennings |

=== Western League Professional Section ===
| 20 Sep 1926 | Swindon Town Reserves | 1 – 1 | Torquay United | County Ground |
| | Goal | | Bloxham |

| 13 Oct 1926 | Weymouth | 0 – 1 | Torquay United | Recreation Ground |
| | | | Daniel |

| 16 Oct 1926 | Torquay United | 3 – 1 | Plymouth Argyle Reserves | Plainmoor |
| | Daniel; Andrews; Pattison | | Goal |

| 23 Oct 1926 | Plymouth Argyle Reserves | 3 – 2 | Torquay United | Home Park |
| | Goal | | Pattison; Morgan |

| 27 Oct 1926 | Torquay United | 0 – 0 | Lovells Athletic | Plainmoor |

| 3 Nov 1926 | Torquay United | 3 – 1 | Swindon Town Reserves | Plainmoor |
| | Morgan; Marlow | | Goal |

| 18 Nov 1926 | Bath City | 2 – 6 | Torquay United | Belvoir |
| | Goal | | Andrews; Marlow; Leslie; Daniel |

| 20 Nov 1926 | Torquay United | 4 – 2 | Exeter City Reserves | Plainmoor |
| | Andrews; Marlow; Hughes (pen.) | | Goal |

| 1 Jan 1927 | Torquay United | 3 – 1 | Bristol Rovers Reserves | Plainmoor |
| | Griffiths; Leslie; Marlow | | Goal |

| 13 Jan 1927 | Lovells Athletic | 1 – 1 | Torquay United | Rexville |
| | Goal | | Leslie (pen.) |

| 29 Jan 1927 | Exeter City Reserves | 3 – 3 | Torquay United | St James Park |
| | Goal | | Bloxham; Griffiths |

| 9 Feb 1927 | Torquay United | 3 – 0 | Bath City | Plainmoor |
| | Marlow |

| 12 Feb 1927 | Bristol Rovers Reserves | 3 – 1 | Torquay United | Eastville Stadium |
| | Goal | | Andrews |

| 9 Mar 1927 | Torquay United | 3 – 1 | Weymouth | Plainmoor |
| | Perry; Marlow | | Bell |

| 26 Mar 1927 | Yeovil & Petters United | 2 – 3 | Torquay United | Pen Mill Athletic Ground |
| | Goal | | Griffiths; Andrews |

| 31 Mar 1927 | Taunton United | 0 – 1 | Torquay United | Taunton |
| | | | Griffiths |

| 15 Apr 1927 | Poole | 2 – 1 | Torquay United | Poole |
| | Goal | | Griffiths |

| 16 Apr 1927 | Torquay United | 4 – 2 | Poole | Plainmoor |
| | Pattison; Marlow; Griffiths | | Goal |

| 23 Apr 1927 | Torquay United | 0 – 2 | Bristol City Reserves | Plainmoor |
| | | | Goal |

| 27 Apr 1927 | Torquay United | 1 – 0 | Taunton United | Plainmoor |
| | Griffiths |

| 4 May 1927 | Bristol City Reserves | 0 – 2 | Torquay United | Ashton Gate |
| | | | Andrews; Griffiths |

| 7 May 1927 | Torquay United | 1 – 0 | Yeovil & Petters United | Plainmoor |
| | Griffiths |

=== FA Cup ===
| 27 Nov 1926 First Round | Torquay United | 1 – 1 | Bristol Rovers | Plainmoor |
| | Bloxham | | Goal |

| 1 Dec 1926 First Round Replay | Bristol Rovers | 0 – 1 | Torquay United | Eastville Stadium |
| | | | Goal |

=== Devon Professional Trophy ===
| 16 Feb 1927 Semi Final | Torquay United | 1 – 5 | Plymouth Argyle XI | Plainmoor |
| | Pattison | | Goal |
