= Ernest Turner =

Ernest Turner may refer to:

- E. S. Turner (Ernest Sackville Turner, 1909–2006), freelance journalist and author
- Ernest Turner (footballer) (1898–1951), Welsh footballer
- Ernest Turner (politician) (1876–1943), Australian politician
