= Trevor Walters =

Trevor Walters may refer to:

- Trevor Walters (singer) (born 1961), British reggae singer in the lovers rock genre
- Trevor Walters (footballer) (1916–1989), played 1937–1949 for Chester City
- Trevor Walters (bishop), British-born Canadian bishop of the Anglican Network in Canada
