= 1936–37 Welsh Cup =

Tournament details
- Country: Wales
- Teams: 69

Final positions
- Champions: (England) Crewe Alexandra
- Runners-up: (Wales) Rhyl

Tournament statistics
- Matches played: 85
- Goals scored: 397 (4.67 per match)

The 1936–37 FAW Welsh Cup is the 56th season of the annual knockout tournament for competitive football teams in Wales.

== Key ==
League name pointed after clubs name.

- B&DL - Birmingham & District League
- CCL - Cheshire County League
- FL D2 - Football League Second Division
- FL D3N - Football League Third Division North
- FL D3S - Football League Third Division South
- MWL - Mid-Wales Football League
- SFL - Southern Football League
- WLN - Welsh League North
- WLS D1 - Welsh League South Division One
- WLS D2E - Welsh League South Division Two East
- WLS D2W - Welsh League South Division Two West
- W&DL - Wrexham & District Amateur League

== First round ==
Tie no	Home	Score	Away
1	Pwllheli (WLN)	2–1	Portmadog (WLN)
2	Blaenau Ffestiniog (WLN)	10–0	Penrhyn Quarry (WLN)
3	Llandudno (WLN)	6–0	Holyhead Town (WLN)
4	Courtaulds Holywell	3–0	Leeswood (W&DL)
5	Flint Town (WLN)	1–1	Buckley Town
replay	Buckley Town	2–0	Flint Town (WLN)
6	Coedpoeth (W&DL)	2–1	Bala Town (W&DL)
7	Llay United	2–2	Cross Street Gwersyllt (W&DL)
replay	Cross Street Gwersyllt (W&DL)	1–1	Llay United
replay	Llay United	1–0	Cross Street Gwersyllt (W&DL)
8	Llay Welfare (W&DL)	4–2	Crosville Wrexham
9	Caergwrle (W&DL)	4–1	Gwersyllt (W&DL)
10	Druids (W&DL)	1–6	Llanerch Celts (W&DL)
11	Newtown (MWL)	1–1	Welshpool
replay	Welshpool	1–2	Newtown (MWL)
12	Penrhiwceiber (WLS D1)	2–2	Caerphilly United (WLS D2E)
replay	Caerphilly United (WLS D2E)	2–1	Penrhiwceiber (WLS D1)
13	Blaina	2–1	Pontymister
14	Haverfordwest (WLS D2W)	1–4	Milford Haven (WLS D2W)
15	Machynlleth (MWL)	1–5	Llanidloes Town (MWL)
16	Caersws (MWL)	2–6	Aberystwyth Town
17	Tywyn (MWL)	2–4	Aberdovey (MWL)
18	Rhayader (MWL)	w/o	Llandrindod Wells

== Second round ==
18 winners from the first round plus Vron United and Ebbw Vale.

Tie no	Home	Score	Away
1	Pwllheli (WLN)	3–3	Aberdovey (MWL)
replay	Aberdovey (MWL)	2–4	Pwllheli (WLN)
2	Buckley Town	2–2	Courtaulds Holywell
replay	Courtaulds Holywell	3–3	Buckley Town
replay	Buckley Town	4–1	Courtaulds Holywell
3	Llandudno (WLN)	2–0	Blaenau Ffestiniog (WLN)
4	Llay Welfare (W&DL)	2–1	Llay United
5	Caergwrle (W&DL)	2–1	Llanerch Celts (W&DL)
6	Vron United (W&DL)	1–4	Coedpoeth (W&DL)
7	Aberystwyth Town	4–1	Rhayader (MWL)
8	Newtown (MWL)	0–1	Llanidloes Town (MWL)
9	Ebbw Vale	3–3	Blaina
replay	Blaina	w/o	Ebbw Vale
10	Milford Haven (WLS D2W)	0–0	Caerphilly United (WLS D2E)
replay	Caerphilly United (WLS D2E)	0–6	Milford Haven (WLS D2W)

== Third round ==
Ten winners from the second round plus 20 new teams.

Tie no	Home	Score	Away
1	Bangor City (B&DL)	7–0	Pwllheli (WLN)
2	Llay Welfare (W&DL)	3–2	Coedpoeth (W&DL)
3	Buckley Town	3–2	Llandudno (WLN)
4	Caergwrle (W&DL)	2–3	Colwyn Bay
5	Wellington Town (B&DL)	2–3	Oswestry Town (B&DL)
6	Kidderminster Harriers (B&DL)	w/o	Northwich Victoria (CCL)
7	Hereford United (B&DL)	4–0	Worcester City (B&DL)
8	Aberystwyth Town	2–2	Llanidloes Town (MWL)
replay	Llanidloes Town (MWL)	1–2	Aberystwyth Town
9	Aberdare Town (WLS D1)	3–4	Aberaman (WLS D1)
10	Lovell's Athletic (WLS D1)	6–4	Blaina
11	Cardiff Corinthians (WLS D1)	0–5	Barry (WLS D1 & SFL)
12	Llanelly (WLS D1)	4–2	Milford Haven (WLS D2W)
13	Caerau Athletic (WLS D1)	2–2	Gelli Colliery
replay	Gelli Colliery	1–1	Caerau Athletic (WLS D1)
replay	Caerau Athletic (WLS D1)	4–5	Gelli Colliery
14	Troedyrhiw (WLS D1)	2–3	Gwynfi Welfare (WLS D1)
15	Caerphilly Town (WLS D1)	3–0*	Porth United (WLS D1)
replay	Porth United (WLS D1)	4–1	Caerphilly Town (WLS D1)

== Fourth round ==
14 winners from the third round. Barry get a bye to the Fifth round.

Tie no	Home	Score	Away
1	Kidderminster Harriers (B&DL)	6–1	Colwyn Bay
2	Oswestry Town (B&DL)	1–1	Bangor City (B&DL)
replay	Bangor City (B&DL)	2–1	Oswestry Town (B&DL)
3	Buckley Town	1–1	Aberystwyth Town
replay	Aberystwyth Town	6–1	Buckley Town
4	Llay Welfare (W&DL)	4–3	Hereford United (B&DL)
5	Aberaman (WLS D1)	7–2	Llanelly (WLS D1)
6	Porth United (WLS D1)	2–2	Lovell's Athletic (WLS D1)
replay	Lovell's Athletic (WLS D1)	2–3	Porth United (WLS D1)
7	Gelli Colliery	1–2	Gwynfi Welfare (WLS D1)

== Fifth round ==
Five winners from the Fourth round plus Barry. Porth United and Llay Welfare get a bye to the Sixth round.

Tie no	Home	Score	Away
1	Kidderminster Harriers (B&DL)	15–2	Aberystwyth Town
2	Aberaman (WLS D1)	3–4	Barry (WLS D1 & SFL)
3	Gwynfi Welfare (WLS D1)	3–7	Bangor City (B&DL)

== Sixth round ==
Three winners from the Fifth round, Porth United, Llay Welfare plus eleven new clubs.

Tie no	Home	Score	Away
1	Llay Welfare (W&DL)	2–9	Crewe Alexandra (FL D3N)
2	Shrewsbury Town (B&DL)	1–2	Kidderminster Harriers (B&DL)
3	Chester (FL D3N)	4–1	Southport (FL D3N)
4	Porth United (WLS D1)	0–5	Newport County (FL D3S)
5	Bristol City (FL D3S)	1–2	Swansea Town (FL D2)
6	Barry (WLS D1 & SFL)	3–1	Cardiff City (FL D3S)
7	Wrexham (FL D3N)	1–2	Rhyl (CCL)
8	New Brighton (FL D3N)	3–2	Bangor City (B&DL)

== Seventh round ==
Tie no	Home	Score	Away
1	Newport County (FL D3S)	7–0	Swansea Town (FL D2)
2	Crewe Alexandra (FL D3N)	2–1	Chester (FL D3N)
3	Barry (WLS D1 & SFL)	2–0	Kidderminster Harriers (B&DL)
4	Rhyl (CCL)	3–0	New Brighton (FL D3N)

== Semifinal ==
Semifinal were held on a neutral venue: Rhyl and Newport County played at Shrewsbury, while Crewe Alexandra and Barry Town played at Cardiff.

Tie no	Home	Score	Away
1	Rhyl (CCL)	3–2	Newport County (FL D3S)
2	Crewe Alexandra (FL D3N)	2–1	Barry (WLS D1 & SFL)

== Final ==
Both final and replay were held in Chester.

Tie no	Home	Score	Away
1	Crewe Alexandra (FL D3N)	1–1	Rhyl (CCL)
replay	Crewe Alexandra (FL D3N)	3–1	Rhyl (CCL)
