= Harry Poulter =

English footballer

Personal information
- Full name: Harry Poulter
- Date of birth: 24 April 1910
- Place of birth: Shiney Row, County Durham, England
- Date of death: 25 February 1985 (aged 74)
- Place of death: Sunderland, England
- Height: 5 ft 10 1/2 in (1.79 m)
- Position: Centre forward

Senior career*
Years	Team	Apps	(Gls)
–	Royal Navy		
–1931	Shiney Row Swifts		
1931–1932	Sunderland	0	(0)
1932–1936	Exeter City	50	(33)
1936	Hartlepools United	0	(0)
- * Club domestic league appearances and goals

Harry Poulter (24 April 1910 – 25 February 1985) was an English footballer who played as a centre forward in the Football League for Exeter City. He played in the FA Cup for Sunderland, and was on the books of Hartlepools United without playing league football for them.

== Life and career ==
Poulter was born in Shiney Row, County Durham. At the time of the 1911 census, he was living in Eden Terrace, Shiney Row, with four older siblings and their parents, Elizabeth and William, a colliery labourer. As a young man, he served in the Royal Navy, and during periods of leave played football for his village club, Shiney Row Swifts of the Wearside League. His goalscoring prowess was noted: he was linked with Middlesbrough, but in 1931 it was Sunderland who bought him out of the service. He made three appearances for the club in the 1931–32 FA Cup, while Bobby Gurney was injured, but was thought too slow, and moved to Third Division South club Exeter City ahead of the 1932–33 Football League season.

Described as "a strong, energetic type of player, and a terrific shot", who performed well on heavy ground when the ball was played for him to run on to, Poulter was initially regarded as a reserve at Exeter. He found his way into the starting eleven, remained with the club for four years, and scored 33 goals from 50 appearances in the league. His career was ruined by illness. In January 1934, he was hospitalised for some weeks after collapsing in the street, and was then sent home to the north of England to convalesce. He scored for the reserve team on his eventual return to the field in mid-April, and scored twice against Brighton & Hove Albion in the semi-final second replay of the Third Division South Cup. He was "rested from intervening games to assist complete recovery after his illness" so that he could play in the final, in which Exeter beat local rivals Torquay United by one goal to nil.

He played regularly and scored well during the 1934–35 season, to the extent that scouts were watching him and fellow goalscorer Paddy Wrightson. The Western Morning News expressed concern that the directors might feel compelled by the club's parlous financial state to accept any serious offer. He did not leave, and began the new season in the team. But in early September, he was again taken ill with what was initially described as "stomach trouble". He returned to the reserves in January, claimed to feel no after-effects from his illness, and attempted a return to first-team football, but "failed to recapture his old form" and intended to retire from professional football at the end of the season. Given a free transfer by Exeter, Poulter returned to the north-east and began a month's trial with Hartlepools United in August 1936, but he never played league football for them.

The 1939 Register listed him as a single man living in his brother's family home in Sunderland, a port maintenance fitter's labourer by occupation and serving with the Police War Reserve on a full-time basis. Poulter died in Sunderland on 25 February 1985 at the age of 74.
