= Fred Warburton =

English footballer and manager

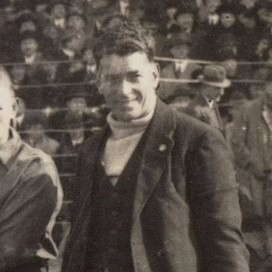

Personal information
- Full name: Frederick Warburton
- Date of birth: 8 August 1880
- Place of birth: Little Bolton, Lancashire, England
- Date of death: 29 November 1948 (aged 68)
- Place of death: Lancashire, England
- Position: Inside forward

Senior career*
Years	Team	Apps	(Gls)
1904–1905	Bolton Wanderers	1	(0)
1905	Bryn Central		
1905–1907	Bury	11	(5)
1907–1908	Swindon Town	24	(9)
1908–1909	Plymouth Argyle	34	(1)
- Accrington Stanley
- Morecambe

Managerial career
- 1910: Amsterdamsche FC
- Hercules Utrecht
- 1913–1935: HVV Den Haag
- 1919–1923: Netherlands
Medal record
Olympic Games
Bronze medal – third place	1920 Antwerp	Football
- * Club domestic league appearances and goals

Frederick Warburton (8 August 1880 – 29 November 1948) was an English football player and manager active in the early part of the 20th century.

== Career ==
=== Playing career ===
Warburton played football professionally in England at the turn of the century. He played one game for Bolton Wanderers, and then after slipping into the non-League with Bryn Central, he played for Bury for two seasons, registering five goals in eleven appearances from a position of inside forward. He later played in the Southern Football League for Swindon Town and Plymouth Argyle, before playing for Accrington Stanley and Morecambe.

=== Coaching career ===
Warburton managed the Netherlands national team from 1919 to 1923.

Warburton was in charge of the team at the 1920 Summer Olympics, winning a bronze medal.

== Personal life ==
He was married to Pauline Walker and had ten children.

Warburton's sons Joe and George were also professional footballers.
