= Bill Pendergast =

Welsh footballer

Personal information
- Full name: William John Pendergast
- Date of birth: 13 April 1915
- Place of birth: Penygroes, Gwynedd, Wales
- Date of death: May 2001 (aged 86)
- Place of death: Denbigh, Wales
- Position: Forward

Senior career*
Years	Team	Apps	(Gls)
- Rhyl Athletic
	Crewe Alexandra	0	(0)
–1935	Wrexham	0	(0)
1935–1936	Manchester United	0	(0)
1936	Wolverhampton Wanderers	0	(0)
1936–1937	Bristol Rovers	7	(3)
1937–1938	Colchester United	8	(5)
1938–1946	Chester	34	(26)
1946–1947	New Brighton	69	(26)
1947–	Rhyl Athletic		
Total		118	(60)
- * Club domestic league appearances and goals

William John Pendergast (13 April 1915 – May 2001) was a Welsh professional footballer who played as a forward in the Football League for Bristol Rovers, Chester and New Brighton. He was also on the books at Manchester United and Wolverhampton Wanderers, but failed to break into the first-team. He also spent time at Crewe Alexandra and Wrexham as an amateur.

== Career ==
Born in Penygroes, Gwynedd, Pendergast began his career with Rhyl Athletic. During 1934 to 1936, Pendergast was registered to a number of clubs. Firstly, he was signed to Football League clubs Crewe Alexandra and then Wrexham as an amateur without making any appearances. In December 1935, he signed professional terms with Manchester United, but left to join Wolverhampton Wanderers in January 1936. He then moved to Bristol Rovers in May 1936 after failing to make a first-team appearance for any of his previous four clubs.

With Bristol Rovers, Pendergast finally made his professional debut on 10 October 1936 against Southend United. He scored three times in seven outings for the Pirates first-team. With the reserves, he helped win the Western League in 1937, scoring 47 goals in just 45 games. He began the 1937–38 season in similar fashion, notching 12 goals in 13 games. Newly formed Southern League club Colchester United's manager Ted Davis had already unsuccessfully attempted to sign Pendergast from Bristol Rovers, but he eventually got his man on 9 December 1937.

Pendergast made his Colchester United debut on 11 December 1937 in a 1–0 victory at Layer Road against Aldershot Reserves in the Southern League Mid-Week Section, and scored his first goal on 1 January 1938 in a 6–1 home win against Barry. After scoring six goals in eleven outings, his Colchester United career came to an end against Bristol Rovers Reserves when he broke his leg on 5 March 1938. Unwilling to risk re-signing the player due to his injury, the club released Pendergast at the end of the season.

Third Division North side Chester took a chance on Pendergast, and the risk paid off, with Pendergast proving that he could perform in the Football League on a regular basis. He scored 26 goals in 34 Football League matches until the outbreak of World War II. This included scoring a record twelve consecutive matches, 13 including an FA Cup match between the league matches. Scoring 16 goals in 13 outings, Pendergast set the record with a hat-trick at home to Stockport County on 10 September 1938, one against Accrington Stanley on 17 September, one against Barnsley on 24 September, two against Oldham Athletic on 1 October, one against Halifax Town on 8 October, one against Gateshead on 15 October, one against Wrexham on 22 October, one against York City on 29 October, one against Rochdale on 5 November, one against Rotherham United on 12 November, one against Doncaster Rovers on 19 November, one against Bradford City in the FA Cup on 26 November, and one against Crewe Alexandra on 3 December.

During the outbreak of the war, Pendergast briefly returned to Colchester to play in some friendly matches arranged in the 1939–40 season during the autumn. He continued to play for Chester throughout the war, scoring 28 goals in 42 wartime matches.

After the war, Pendergast continued to play in the Football League, joining New Brighton ahead of the 1946–47 season. He scored 26 goals in 69 league appearances, before rejoining Rhyl in 1947.
