= Tom Feeney (footballer) =

English footballer

Personal information
- Full name: Thomas Wilfred Feeney
- Date of birth: 26 August 1910
- Place of birth: Grangetown, North Yorkshire, England
- Date of death: 5 March 1973 (aged 62)
- Height: 5 ft 10 in (1.78 m)
- Positions: Centre forward; inside forward

Senior career*
Years	Team	Apps	(Gls)
192?–1928	Grangetown St Mary's		
1928–1931	Whitby United		
1931–1932	Newcastle United	4	(1)
1932–1933	Notts County	17	(2)
1933–1934	Lincoln City	10	(0)
1934	Stockport County	2	(0)
1934–1937	Halifax Town	52	(11)
1937–1938	Chester	5	(0)
1938–1939	Darlington	40	(22)
- * Club domestic league appearances and goals

Thomas Wilfred Feeney (26 August 1910 – 5 March 1973), generally known as Tom Feeney but also as Wilf Feeney, was an English footballer who scored 36 goals from 130 appearances in the Football League playing as a centre forward or inside forward for Newcastle United, Notts County, Lincoln City, Stockport County, Halifax Town, Chester and Darlington in the 1930s. He began his career in non-league football with Grangetown St Mary's and Whitby United.
