= George Warburton (footballer, born 1915) =

English footballer

Personal information
- Date of birth: 12 December 1915
- Place of birth: The Hague, Netherlands
- Date of death: 26 October 1996 (aged 80)
- Position: Forward

Senior career*
Years	Team	Apps	(Gls)
–	Morecambe	?	(?)
1936–1937	Aston Villa	0	(0)
1937–1938	Preston North End	0	(0)
1938–1939	Chester	11	(3)
–	Morecambe	?	(?)
–	Netherfield	?	(?)
–	Lancaster City	?	(?)
Total		?	(?)
- * Club domestic league appearances and goals

George Warburton (12 December 1915 – 26 October 1996) was an English professional footballer who played as a forward.

== Career ==
Born in The Hague, Netherlands - where his father Fred was a football coach - Warburton played for Morecambe, Aston Villa, Preston North End, Chester, Netherfield and Lancaster City.

Warburton played alongside his brother Joe at Morecambe.
