= Frank Wragge =

English footballer (1898–1973)

Frank Wragge (9 February 1898 – 1973) was an English professional footballer who played as a centre-half for Wolverhampton Wanderers, Bristol Rovers, Walsall, and Oakengates football clubs. Standing 6 feet 3/4 inches tall and weighing 13 stone, he was considered a "giant" and fast for his height.

== Career ==
Wragge was with Wolverhampton Wanderers for four seasons. He made his Bristol Rovers debut on 10 October 1923, scoring the only goal in his League career on 16 September 1925.

He joined Torquay United in 1927, after helping to knock Torquay out of the English Cup the season before when he was with Bristol. He signed with Walsall as a left-back the following year. He then played for Stafford Rangers before rejoining his former junior club, Oakengates Town, in 1931.

== Personal life ==
Wragge was born in Wolverhampton. He was married to Mabel Wragge (née Foulkes), who was an active supporter of the Oakengates football club. She predeceased him in 1938, at the age of 37.
