= 1936–37 Southern Football League =

The 1936–37 season was the 39th in the history of the Southern League. The league reverted to a single division after four of the league's nineteen clubs left at the end of the previous season. Newly elected Ipswich Town won the title at the first attempt, whilst Margate left the league at the end of the season. Ipswich applied for election to the Football League, but were unsuccessful.

== Final table ==
Southern Football League
- Season: 1936–37
- Champions: Ipswich Town (1st title)
- Promoted: none
- Relegated: Margate (resigned)
- Matches: 240
- Goals: 974 (4.06 per match)

The league comprised the seven remaining clubs from the Eastern Division, the eight clubs remaining in the Western Division and one new club.

Newly elected team:

- Ipswich Town - elected from the Eastern Counties League.

Pos	Team	Pld	W	D	L	GF	GA	GR	Pts	Result
1	Ipswich Town	30	19	8	3	68	35	1.943	46	
2	Norwich City II	30	18	5	7	70	35	2.000	41	
3	Folkestone	30	17	4	9	71	61	1.164	38	
4	Bath City	30	15	5	10	66	52	1.269	35	
5	Margate	30	15	4	11	61	49	1.245	34	Left league at end of season
6	Guildford City	30	15	4	11	54	60	0.900	34	
7	Yeovil & Petters United	30	15	3	12	77	69	1.116	33	
8	Newport County II	30	11	8	11	72	68	1.059	30	
9	Plymouth Argyle II	30	11	8	11	64	58	1.103	30	
10	Barry	30	12	4	14	58	72	0.806	28	
11	Cheltenham Town	30	10	4	16	61	70	0.871	24	
12	Exeter City II	30	8	7	15	57	78	0.731	23	
13	Dartford	30	9	5	16	41	55	0.745	23	
14	Torquay United II	30	8	5	17	45	76	0.592	21	
15	Tunbridge Wells Rangers	30	7	6	17	62	64	0.969	20	
16	Aldershot II	30	7	6	17	47	72	0.653	20	

Rules for classification: The system of using goal average to separate two teams tied on points was used until the 1976-77 season. The points system: 2 points for a win, 1 point for a draw and 0 points for losing.

== Football League election ==
Ipswich Town were the only non-League club to apply for election to the Football League Third Division South, but won fewer votes than League clubs Exeter City and Aldershot.

Club	League	Votes
Exeter City	Football League Third Division South	40
Aldershot	Football League Third Division South	34
Ipswich Town	Southern League	24
