= Willie Brown (footballer, born 1900) =

Scottish footballer

William ( Bill ) Brown
Personal information
- Full name: William James Brown
- Date of birth: 13 November 1900
- Place of birth: Dundee
- Date of death: 23 August 1977 (aged 76)
- Position: Full back

Senior career*
Years	Team	Apps	(Gls)
1919	Dundee North End		
1919	Dundee		
1920	Porth		
1922	Llanelly		
1925-1928	Rochdale	178	(0)
1928-1929	Torquay United	16	(0)
1929	Dundalk		
Total		194	(0)
- * Club domestic league appearances and goals

William John Brown (13 November 1900 – 23 August 1977) was a Scottish professional footballer. He was born in Larne, although of Scottish descent, returning to Dundee in 1901.

Brown, a full-back, played for a local junior side Dundee North End F.C before joining Welsh side Llanelli for the 1922–23 season. He moved to Rochdale in 1923, making his debut in the opening game of 1923–24, a 2–0 home win against Durham. Bill played 178 league games for Rochdale without finding the net and completed a run of 85 successive games toward the end of the 26/27 season. He was part of the Rochdale side which defeated Chesterfield 8-1 during the same campaign, a club record which stands today. Originally a left back he was switched to the right back position during this period. However, after a loss to New Brighton the following season he was dropped and subsequently released after 5 years with the club. His last match was a 1–0 home win against Doncaster on 5 May 1928.

Brown joined Torquay United in 1928. He started the first game of the 1928–29 season, a 4–3 defeat at home to Queens Park Rangers. He did however struggle to establish himself and left Plainmoor, after playing 16 times, to join Dundalk after losing his place in defence to Sid Cann. Following his career Bill returned to Dundee.
