= George Cook (footballer, born 1904) =

English footballer

Personal information
- Date of birth: 20 November 1904
- Place of birth: Shankhouse, Northumberland, England
- Positions: Full back; left half

Senior career*
Years	Team	Apps	(Gls)
–1924	Bedlington United		
1924	Gillingham	7	(0)
1924–25	Preston North End	23	(0)
–1928	Torquay United	29	(0)
1928–?	Carlisle United	23	(0)
- Sittingbourne
- Blyth Spartans
1930–31	Everton	0	(0)
1931–32	Tranmere Rovers	1	(0)
1932	Carlisle United	5	(0)
- * Club domestic league appearances and goals

George Cook (20 November 1904 – after 1932) was an English professional footballer. He was born in Shankhouse, Northumberland.

Cook, a right-back, began his career with Bedlington United, joining Gillingham and making his league debut in the 1924–25 season. The same season saw Cook move to Preston North End where he made 23 league appearances. He then joined Torquay United and played in their first ever game in the Football League, a 1–1 draw at home to local rivals Exeter City on 27 August 1927. He played 29 times that season for Torquay before moving to Carlisle United in 1928. He played in Carlisle's first ever league game, a 3–2 win against Accrington Stanley on 25 August 1928. He played 23 times that season before moving to non-league Sittingbourne.

He subsequently moved to Blyth Spartans before joining Everton in 1930. He failed to make the first team at Goodison Park, moving to Tranmere Rovers. His only appearance for Tranmere came in December 1931, playing at centre-half in a 9–1 win at home to Rochdale. He returned to Carlisle United, playing five further league games before ending his league career.
