= George Appleyard =

English footballer

Personal information
- Full name: George Charles Appleyard
- Date of birth: 31 May 1900
- Place of birth: Rawmarsh, England
- Date of death: 7 August 1967 (aged 67)
- Place of death: Rotherham, England
- Height: 5 ft 10 in (1.78 m)
- Position: Forward

Senior career*
Years	Team	Apps	(Gls)
- Rotherham Forge
- Rotherham Town
- Rawmarsh Athletic
????–1924	Barnsley	4	(2)
1924–1925	Exeter City	8	(1)
1925–1926	Torquay United		
1926–19??	Wrexham	5	(2)
- * Club domestic league appearances and goals

George Charles Appleyard (31 May 1900 – 7 August 1967) was an English football forward. He was born in Rawmarsh, Yorkshire.

Appleyard began his career with Rotherham Forge, subsequently playing for Rotherham Town and Rawmarsh Athletic before joining Barnsley where he made his league debut in the 1923–24 season. He joined Exeter City in 1924 before moving to local rivals Torquay United where he was a regular in their Southern League side in the 1925–26 season. He also played in all eight of Torquay's FA Cup games that season as they reached the first round and took Third Division Reading to a second replay.

He left at the end of the 1925–26 season to join Wrexham.
