= Bert Turner (footballer, born 1899) =

English footballer

Personal information
- Full name: Herbert Lewis Turner
- Date of birth: 17 February 1899
- Place of birth: Smethwick, England
- Date of death: 21 December 1953 (aged 54)
- Position: Forward

Senior career*
Years	Team	Apps	(Gls)
–	Darlaston		
1919–1920	Birmingham	0	(0)
1920–1924	Merthyr Town	125	(34)
1924–1926	Coventry City	30	(7)
–	Brierley Hill Alliance		
1927–1928	Torquay United	38	(11)
1928–19??	Bristol Rovers	9	(2)
–	Brierley Hill Alliance		
–	Standard Athletic		
- * Club domestic league appearances and goals

Herbert Lewis "Bert" Turner (17 February 1899 – 21 December 1953) was an English professional footballer who could play in any of the forward positions.

Turner was born in Smethwick and played for Darlaston before joining Birmingham on the resumption of competitive football after the First World War. He joined Merthyr Town in 1920 for their first season in the Football League and went on to play 125 league games, scoring 34 goals for the Welsh side. From 1922 to 1924, he was joined in the forward line by Ernest Turner, to whom he was not related.

In 1924 he returned to the Midlands, joining Coventry City, but left after 30 league games to play for non-league Brierley Hill Alliance. He joined Torquay United in 1927 and played in their first match in the Football League, scoring a penalty in a 1–1 draw with local rivals Exeter City at Plainmoor on 27 August 1927.

He missed just four games that season, but left at the end of it, joining Bristol Rovers before rejoining Brierley Hill Alliance and later playing for Standard Athletic.
