= Len Marlow =

English footballer

Personal information
- Full name: Leonard Frederick Marlow
- Date of birth: 30 April 1899
- Place of birth: Putney, England
- Date of death: 1975 (aged 75–76)
- Height: 5 ft 8 1/2 in (1.74 m)
- Position: Striker

Senior career*
Years	Team	Apps	(Gls)
1921–1922	Huddersfield Town	1	(0)
1925–1927	Torquay United		
- * Club domestic league appearances and goals

Leonard Frederick Marlow (30 April 1899 – 1975) was a professional footballer who played for Huddersfield Town and Torquay United. He was born in Putney. Huddersfield signed him from Kingstonian F.C. in 1921–22 season having scored 20 goals in 17 appearances for the Athenian League club. He later played for Torquay United between 1925 and 1927, becoming joint top scorer for the 1926–27 season.
