= Bill Gardner (footballer) =

English footballer

Personal information
- Full name: William Gardner
- Date of birth: 7 June 1893
- Place of birth: Langley Moor, County Durham, England
- Date of death: 1973 (aged 79–80)
- Height: 5 ft 7 in (1.70 m)
- Positions: Inside forward; centre forward

Senior career*
| Years | Team | Apps | (Gls) |
- Redworth
- St Helen's United
- Brandon Institute
- St Helen's WM Club
- Durham City
- Crook Town
| –1920 | Bishop Auckland | | |
| 1920–1921 | Derby County | 5 | (1) |
| 1921–1923 | Spennymoor United | | |
| 1923 | Queens Park Rangers | 2 | (0) |
| 1923–1925 | Ashington | 84 | (38) |
| 1925–1927 | Grimsby Town | 20 | (4) |
| 1927–1928 | Darlington | 19 | (16) |
| 1928–1929 | Torquay United | 23 | (8) |
| 1929–1931 | York City | 51 | (26) |
| 1931–1932 | Crewe Alexandra | 12 | (2) |
| 1932–1933 | Rochdale | 1 | (0) |
| Total | | 217 | (95) |

International career
| 1920 | England Amateurs | 2 | (5) |
- * Club domestic league appearances and goals

William Gardner (7 June 1893 – 1973), also known as Wally Gardner, was an English professional footballer who played as an inside forward or a centre forward in the Football League for Derby County, Queens Park Rangers, Ashington, Grimsby Town, Darlington, Torquay United, York City, Crewe Alexandra and Rochdale and in non-League football for Bishop Auckland and Spennymoor United. He was capped by the England national amateur team, scoring two goals in five matches in 1920.
