= Alf Matthews =

English footballer

Personal information
- Date of birth: 28 April 1901
- Place of birth: Bristol, England
- Date of death: 1985 (aged 83–84)
- Place of death: Plymouth, Devon
- Position: Outside right

Senior career*
Years	Team	Apps	(Gls)
–	Parson Street OB		
1921–1922	Bristol City	1	(0)
1922–1926	Exeter City	138	(13)
1926–1933	Plymouth Argyle	142	(30)
1933–1934	Doncaster Rovers	8	(1)
1934–1935	Crystal Palace	0	(0)
- * Club domestic league appearances and goals

Alfred William Matthews (28 April 1901 – 1985) was an English professional footballer who made nearly 300 appearances in the Football League playing for Bristol City, Exeter City, Plymouth Argyle and Doncaster Rovers. He played as an outside right.

== Biography ==
Matthews was born in Bristol, and played local football before joining hometown club Bristol City. He made his debut in the Football League in the 1921–22 season, but played only that one game for Bristol City before moving on to Exeter City the following season. He spent four years at Exeter as a regular first-team player before joining Plymouth Argyle, where he continued to play regularly for three seasons. Thereafter he remained with the club for a further four years, but appeared only infrequently, making a total of 147 appearances in all competitions, of which the last came in March 1933. He then played a few games for Doncaster Rovers and signed for Crystal Palace but never appeared in the League. He died in 1985.
