= Ernest Turner (footballer) =

Welsh footballer

Personal information
- Full name: Ernest Turner
- Date of birth: 1898
- Place of birth: Brithdir, Caerphilly, Wales
- Date of death: 7 December 1951 (aged 52–53)
- Place of death: Merthyr, Wales
- Height: 5 ft 7 in (1.70 m)
- Position: Forward

Senior career*
Years	Team	Apps	(Gls)
- Bargoed
- Caerphilly
1922–1925	Merthyr Town	110	(32)
1925–1926	Southampton	16	(3)
- * Club domestic league appearances and goals

Ernest Turner (1898 – 7 December 1951) was a Welsh footballer who played as a forward for Merthyr Town and Southampton in the 1920s.

== Football career ==
Turner was born in Brithdir, Caerphilly and after playing for minor clubs, Bargoed and Caerphilly, he joined Merthyr Town in May 1922.

In his first season, he played at centre forward for the Football League Third Division South club and was their top scorer with twelve goals from forty appearances. Herbert Lewis "Bert" Turner, to whom he was not related, played alongside him at inside left, scoring five. For the following season, the players swapped positions with Bert moving into the centre, but Ernest continued to outscore his namesake, with fifteen goals to Bert's five.

In 1924–25 season, both players struggled to find the net contributing five goals each, as Merthyr finished at the foot of the table, but were re-elected to the Football League for the following season. During his time with Merthyr, he was selected to represent the Welsh F.A. on several occasions.

After three seasons with Merthyr, Turner moved to southern England in May 1925 to join Southampton in the Second Division. In his one season at The Dell, Turner failed to hold down a regular position and played at both inside-forward positions as well as centre-forward generally as a replacement for the long-serving Arthur Dominy and Bill Rawlings.

He made sixteen appearances, scoring three goals, in the 1925–26 season before deciding to emigrate to Canada in May 1926.

== Later life and family ==
Turner subsequently returned to his native country, and he died in Merthyr in December 1951.

His younger brother, Herbert Gwyn "Bert" Turner, was a Welsh international, who had a long career with Charlton Athletic and scored for both sides in the 1946 FA Cup Final against Derby County.
