= 1925–26 Southern Football League =

The 1925–26 season was the 28th in the history of the Southern League. The league consisted of Eastern and Western Divisions. Millwall II won the Eastern Division and Plymouth Argyle II won the Western Division. Plymouth were declared Southern League champions after defeating Millwall 1–0 in a championship play-off.

No clubs from the Southern League applied to join the Football League, whilst four clubs left the league at the end of the season.

== Eastern Division ==
Southern Football League Eastern Division
- Season: 1925–26
- Champions: Millwall II
- Promoted: none
- Relegated: Fulham II (resigned); Coventry City II (resigned); Nuneaton Town (resigned)
- Matches: 306
- Goals: 1,384 (4.52 per match)

A total of 18 teams contest the division, including 16 sides from previous season and two new teams.

Newly elected teams:

- Grays Thurrock United
- Fulham II

Pos	Team	Pld	W	D	L	GF	GA	GR	Pts	Result
1	Millwall II	34	24	6	4	106	37	2.865	54	
2	Leicester City II	34	23	2	9	105	60	1.750	48	
3	Brighton & Hove Albion II	34	21	4	9	105	69	1.522	46	
4	Kettering Town	34	19	5	10	98	68	1.441	43	
5	Peterborough & Fletton United	34	19	3	12	76	62	1.226	41	
6	Portsmouth II	34	17	5	12	76	67	1.134	39	
7	Norwich City II	34	17	4	13	85	90	0.944	38	
8	Bournemouth & Boscombe Athletic II	34	15	7	12	76	67	1.134	37	
9	Southampton II	34	14	7	13	65	72	0.903	35	
10	Fulham II	34	13	6	15	86	77	1.117	32	Left league at end of season
11	Grays Thurrock United	34	13	5	16	63	77	0.818	31	
12	Guildford United	34	11	8	15	71	87	0.816	30	
13	Watford II	34	12	2	20	62	94	0.660	26	
14	Luton Town II	34	11	3	20	70	78	0.897	25	
15	Folkestone	34	9	6	19	67	93	0.720	24	
16	Reading II	34	10	3	21	58	84	0.690	23	
17	Coventry City II	34	9	5	20	54	93	0.581	23	Left league at end of season
18	Nuneaton Town	34	7	3	24	61	109	0.560	17	Left league at end of season

Rules for classification: The system of using goal average to separate two teams tied on points was used until the 1976–77 season. The points system: 2 points for a win, 1 point for a draw and 0 points for losing.

== Western Division ==
Southern Football League Western Division
- Season: 1925–26
- Champions: Plymouth Argyle II (2nd title)
- Promoted: none
- Relegated: Pontypridd (resigned)
- Matches: 182
- Goals: 709 (3.9 per match)

The Western Division featured the same clubs as the previous season, minus the six clubs that had left.

Pos	Team	Pld	W	D	L	GF	GA	GR	Pts	Result (Note: Number of goals for and/or against is inaccurate.)
1	Plymouth Argyle II	26	20	1	5	67	31	2.161	41	
2	Bristol City II	26	16	4	6	48	28	1.714	36	
3	Bristol Rovers II	26	13	4	9	51	35	1.457	30	
4	Swindon Town II	26	13	4	9	57	40	1.425	30	
5	Ebbw Vale	26	13	3	10	60	46	1.304	29	
6	Torquay United	26	12	5	9	59	46	1.283	29	
7	Yeovil & Petters United	26	9	8	9	43	48	0.896	26	
8	Mid Rhondda United	26	12	1	13	47	49	0.959	25	
9	Weymouth	26	10	3	13	64	60	1.067	23	
10	Exeter City II	26	8	5	13	40	49	0.816	21	
11	Barry	26	8	4	14	47	55	0.855	20	
12	Taunton United	26	9	2	15	44	60	0.733	20	
13	Pontypridd	26	7	5	14	44	77	0.571	19	Left league at end of season
14	Bath City	26	7	1	18	38	86	0.442	15	

Rules for classification: The system of using goal average to separate two teams tied on points was used until the 1976–77 season. The points system: 2 points for a win, 1 point for a draw and 0 points for losing.
