= John Pullen =

Welsh footballer

Personal information
- Date of birth: 1 November 1901
- Place of birth: Wales
- Position: Centre half

Senior career*
Years	Team	Apps	(Gls)
19??–1924	Ebbw Vale		
1924–1934	Plymouth Argyle	194	(17)

International career
1926	Wales	1	(0)
- * Club domestic league appearances and goals

John Pullen (born 1 November 1901) was a Welsh footballer who played as a centre half.

An imposing defender, Pullen made a name for himself at Ebbw Vale before joining Plymouth Argyle in 1924. He established himself in the first team in January 1925 and played regularly for the club over the next nine years. He scored seven goals in 22 league appearances in the 1929–30 season, which ended with the club being crowned as Third Division South champions. Pullen earned one senior cap for Wales, playing alongside club team-mate Moses Russell against England on 1 March 1926.
