= Jimmy Jones (footballer, born 1895) =

Welsh footballer

James 'Jimmy' Jones
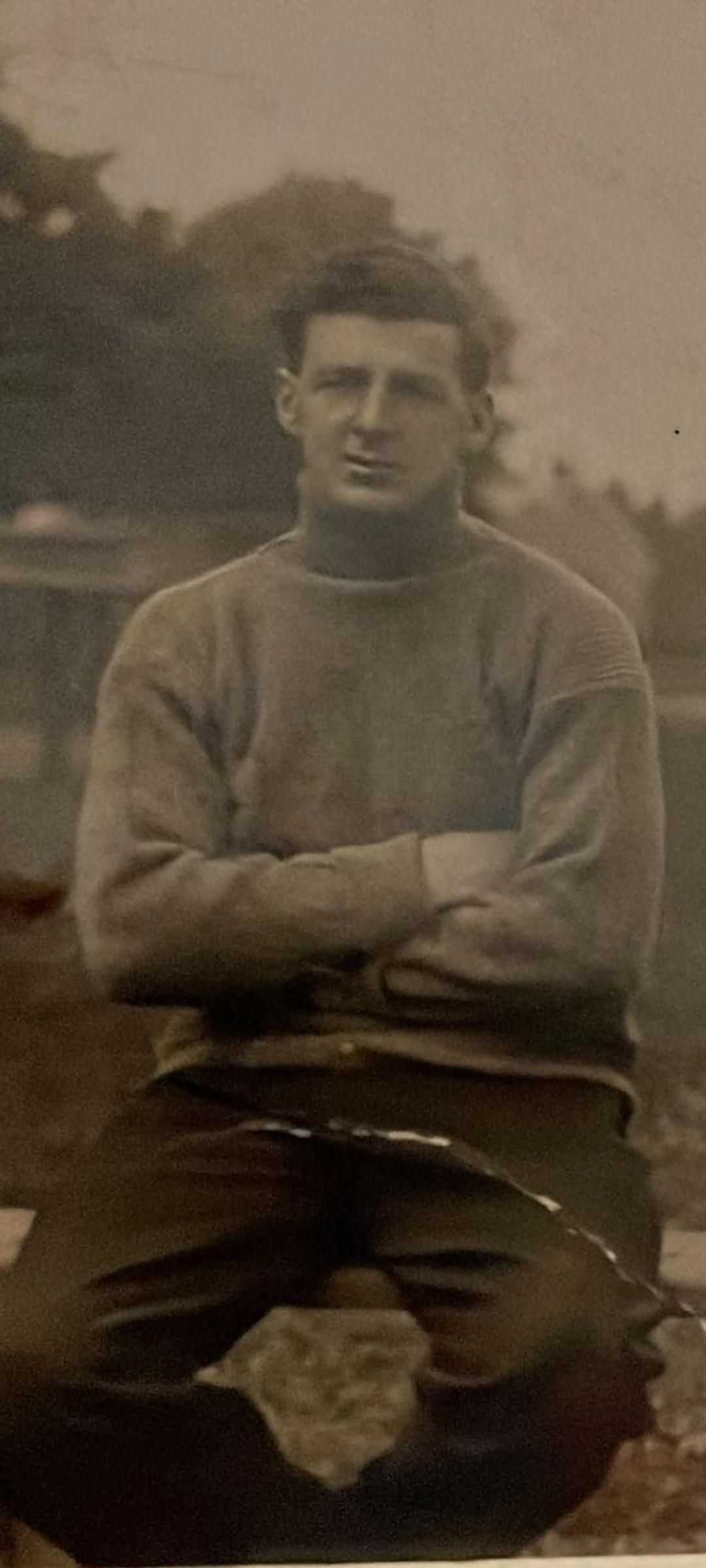

Personal information
- Date of birth: 1895
- Place of birth: Treorci, Wales
- Date of death: 1966 (aged 70–71)
- Position: Forward

Senior career*
Years	Team	Apps	(Gls)
- Ton Pentre
- Portsmouth
1922–1924	Cardiff City	12	(2)
1924–1926	Wrexham	40	(22)
1926–1927	Aberdare Athletic		
1927–1928	Torquay United	20	(6)
- Worcester City

International career
1925	Wales	1	(0)
- * Club domestic league appearances and goals

James 'Jimmy' Jones (1895 – 1966) was a Welsh international footballer. He was selected for the Wales national football team, making 3 appearances and being named in the starting line up on 18 April 1925 against Ireland. At club level, he played for Cardiff City, Wrexham and Torquay United.

== See also ==
- List of Wales international footballers (alphabetical)
