= Herbert Budd =

English footballer

Personal information
- Date of birth: 26 February 1904
- Place of birth: England
- Date of death: 1979 (aged 74–75)
- Position: Centre-forward

Senior career*
Years	Team	Apps	(Gls)
- Hanham Athletic
	Exeter City	0	(0)
1927–1929	Torquay United	9	(2)
- Kettering Town
- Bath City
- * Club domestic league appearances and goals

Herbert R. Budd (26 February 1904 – 1979) was an English professional footballer.

== Career ==
Budd began his career with Hanham Athletic, joining Exeter City in the 1926–27 season, but failing to appear in their league team. He joined Torquay United in 1927, debuting on 17 December in a 1–1 draw at home to Gillingham. He played a further six games that season, Torquay's first in the Football League, scoring twice. He again struggled to make the first team the following season, playing only twice despite Torquay using several players at centre-forward that season.

On leaving Torquay he joined non-league Kettering Town and subsequently played for Bath City.
