= Jim Mackey (footballer) =

English footballer

Personal information
- Full name: James Alfred Mackey
- Date of birth: 25 November 1897
- Place of birth: Ryton, County Durham, England
- Position: Outside right

Senior career*
Years	Team	Apps	(Gls)
1920–1921	Coventry City	12	(0)
- Carlisle United
1923	Notts County	3	(1)
1923–1924	Lincoln City	21	(2)
1924–1925	Luton Town	10	(1)
1925–1926	Crewe Alexandra	3	(4)
?–1928	Torquay United	67	(6)
- * Club domestic league appearances and goals

James Alfred Mackey (25 November 1897 in Ryton, County Durham – 1990) was an English professional footballer as an outside-right.

== Career ==
Mackey joined Coventry City from Newburn Colliery, making his league debut in the 1920–21 season. He played 12 league games before joining Carlisle United. In 1923 he moved to Notts County, scoring once in three games before a move to Lincoln City later that year.

In the summer of 1924, Mackey moved to Luton Town, scoring once in 10 games. He started the next season with Crewe Alexandra, and despite playing 35 games, scoring four goals, left at the end of the season to join West Stanley in his native North-East of England.

He returned to league football with Torquay United, playing in their first ever game in the Football League, a 1–1 draw against local rivals Exeter City at Plainmoor on 27 August 1927. He missed just two games that season, but was kept out of the side at the start of the following season by Dan Kelly. He returned to the side in October 1928 was a regular for much of the remainder of the season.

He left Torquay at the end of the 1928–29 season and subsequently played non-League football for Dartford, Sheppey United, Bexleyheath & Welling, Dargas Sports and VCD Athletic.
