= Bill Chambers (footballer) =

English footballer

Personal information
- Full name: William Thomas Chambers
- Date of birth: 10 August 1906
- Place of birth: Wednesbury, England
- Date of death: 1978 (aged 71 or 72)
- Height: 5 ft 8 in (1.73 m)
- Position: Inside forward

Senior career*
Years	Team	Apps	(Gls)
	West Bromwich Albion	0	(0)
	Wednesbury Town	?	(?)
	Worcester City	?	(?)
	Shrewsbury Town	?	(?)
	Darlaston Town	?	(?)
1929?–1930?	Burnley	2	(0)
	Lovells Athletic	?	(?)
	Shrewsbury Town	?	(?)
	Darlaston Town	?	(?)
1932?–1934?	Halifax Town	70	(50)
1934?–1935?	Bolton Wanderers	2	(1)
1935?–1936?	Oldham Athletic	10	(2)
1936–1938	Chester	48	(18)
	Bath City	?	(?)
- * Club domestic league appearances and goals

William Thomas Chambers (10 August 1906 – 1978) was an English-born association footballer who played as an inside forward. He played for a number of Football League and non-league clubs in the 1920s and 1930s, and enjoyed notable spells with Halifax Town and Chester.

He holds the Halifax Town record for most goals scored in a game, netting six in a Football League Division Three North match against Hartlepools United in April 1934.
