= Jack Pattison =

English footballer

Personal information
- Full name: John William Pattison
- Date of birth: 10 April 1887
- Place of birth: Durham, England
- Date of death: 1970
- Position: Outside left

Senior career*
Years	Team	Apps	(Gls)
- Leadgate Park
- Framwellgate Moor
- Durham City
1920	Newcastle United		
- Durham City
1921	Derby County	15	(2)
1922–1923	Bristol Rovers	13	(1)
- Leadgate Park
1924	South Shields		
1925	Durham City	6	(2)
1925	South Shields		
1927	Torquay United	26	(5)
- Taunton United
- Grays Thurrock United
- Dunston United
- West Stanley
- Durham City
- Bath City
- Frenchay United
- Glastonbury
- Warminster Town
- * Club domestic league appearances and goals

John William Pattison (10 April 1887 – 1970) was a footballer who played as an outside left for a number of clubs in the Football League.
