= Fred Forbes =

Scottish footballer

Personal information
- Full name: Frederick James Forbes
- Date of birth: 5 August 1894
- Place of birth: Leith, Scotland
- Height: 5 ft 7 1/2 in (1.71 m)
- Position: Forward

Senior career*
Years	Team	Apps	(Gls)
- Leith Athletic
1920–1922	Heart of Midlothian	20	(34)
1922–1925	Everton	14	(4)
1925–1929	Plymouth Argyle	159	(53)
1929–1931	Bristol Rovers	63	(10)
1931–1932	Leith Athletic		
1932–1933	Northampton Town	35	(3)
–	Airdrieonians		
- * Club domestic league appearances and goals

Frederick James Forbes (5 August 1894 – after 1933) was a Scottish footballer who played as a forward. He made 271 appearances in the Football League for Everton, Plymouth Argyle, Bristol Rovers and Northampton Town.

== Life and career ==
Born in Leith, now a district of Edinburgh, Forbes could play as an inside or outside forward on the right and as a centre forward. He began his career with his local club, Leith Athletic, where his performances earned him a transfer to Heart of Midlothian in 1920. In his first full season with the club, he scored 23 league goals in 14 appearances as they finished third in the First Division. He scored a further 11 goals in six appearances the following season before moving to England to play for Everton in 1922. He was restricted to 14 league appearances in three years at Goodison Park, scoring four goals. In 1925, he was transferred to Plymouth Argyle, alongside teammate Jack Cock, where he played regularly for the next four years. He scored 53 goals in all competitions for the club in 166 appearances, including a four in the first match of the 1927–28 season.

Forbes joined Bristol Rovers in 1929, where he scored 10 goals in 63 league appearances during his year with the club. He returned to Leith Athletic in 1930 and spent a further two years with his local club. He joined Northampton Town in 1932 and made a further 35 appearances in the Football League. He finished his career back in Scotland with Airdrieonians.
