= Tom Alderson =

English footballer (1909–1962)

Personal information
- Full name: Thomas Alderson
- Date of birth: 1909
- Place of birth: West Auckland, England
- Date of death: 1962 (aged 52–53)
- Place of death: Durham, England
- Height: 5 ft 10 in (1.78 m)
- Position: Inside left

Senior career*
| Years | Team | Apps | (Gls) |
- West Auckland
| 1927 | Bradford City | 0 | (0) |
| 1928 | Cockfield | | |
| 1929 | Huddersfield Town | 0 | (0) |
| 1930 | Leeds United | 4 | (2) |
| 1932 | Luton Town | 14 | (5) |
| 1933–1935 | Darlington | 116 | (39) |
| 1936–1937 | Chester | 44 | (4) |
| 1937–1938 | Darlington | 35 | (7) |
- * Club domestic league appearances and goals

Thomas Alderson (1909–1962) was a footballer who played in the Football League for Chester, Darlington, Leeds United, Luton Town.
