= George Smith (footballer, born June 1901) =

English footballer

Personal information
- Full name: George Henry Smith
- Date of birth: 6 June 1901
- Place of birth: Netherton, England
- Height: 5 ft 7 in (1.70 m)
- Position: Left-back

Senior career*
Years	Team	Apps	(Gls)
1922–1923	Chelsea	0	(0)
1923–1924	Gillingham	0	(0)
1924–1927	Walsall	92	(2)
1927	Torquay United	6	(0)
- Exmouth Town
- Newton Abbot Spurs
- * Club domestic league appearances and goals

George Henry Smith (born 6 June 1901, date of death unknown) was an English-born footballer of the 1920s who played as a left-back.

== Biography ==
Smith was born in Netherton and began his career with Chelsea, but left there and his next club Gillingham without making a league appearance. He then joined Walsall, for whom he made his first competitive appearance in 1924–25, and went on to play 92 league matches for them.

He joined Torquay United for the 1927–28 season and later played for Exmouth Town and Newton Abbot Spurs.
