= Paddy Wrightson =

English footballer

Personal information
- Full name: Frank Lawrence Wrightson
- Date of birth: 9 January 1906
- Place of birth: Shildon, England
- Date of death: 1979 (aged 73)
- Place of death: Cleveland, England
- Height: 5 ft 10 1/2 in (1.79 m)
- Positions: Inside forward; centre forward

Senior career*
Years	Team	Apps	(Gls)
–	Ferryhill Athletic		
1928–1930	Darlington	36	(16)
1930–1932	Manchester City	22	(4)
1932–1933	Fulham	18	(5)
1933–1935	Exeter City	71	(25)
1935–1939	Chester	89	(73)
- * Club domestic league appearances and goals

Frank Lawrence Wrightson (9 January 1906 – 1979), also known as Paddy Wrightson, was an English footballer who scored 123 goals from 236 appearances in the Football League playing as an inside forward or centre forward in the 1920s and 1930s.

He played amateur football for Ferryhill Athletic of the Northern League before joining Darlington, with whom he made his Football League debut in the Third Division North and turned professional. In 1930, he signed for First Division club Manchester City, but he was not a success at that level, and moved on to Fulham. He helped them gain promotion to the Second Division, but played little after that. He joined Exeter City of the Third Division South in March 1933. In his second full season with Exeter he began scoring heavily, and at his final club, Chester of the Third Division North, he set a club record of 73 Football League goals that stood for 40 years.

== Personal life ==
Wrightson was born in Shildon, County Durham, the son of Thomas Wrightson and his wife Lizzie. At the time of the 1911 census, Thomas was working as a forgeman and living with Lizzie and their four children in Beresford Street, New Shildon. Wrightson himself followed in his father's trade, working as a blacksmith at the London and North Eastern Railway's workshops at Shildon, before he became a professional footballer. He died in Cleveland in 1979 at the age of 73.

== Football career ==
=== Early career ===
By January 1927, Wrightson was playing as an amateur for Northern League club Ferryhill Athletic. In the summer of 1928, he became one of several hundred Durham amateur footballers suspended for six months and declared professional for receiving payments over and above legitimate expenses. He played as an amateur for Darlington in the latter half of the 1928–29 season, and made his debut in the Football League Third Division North on 30 March 1929 in a 3–2 defeat at home to Stockport County. He appeared twice more that season, without scoring, and then turned professional. He appeared in the first 33 matches of the 1929–30 season and scored 16 goals, playing mainly at inside right in support of 34-goal centre-forward Maurice Wellock as Darlington headed for a third-place finish.

=== Manchester City and Fulham ===
In mid-March 1930, he became the sixth player in ten days to sign for Manchester City of the First Division; the fee was "stated to be above £2000". He went straight into the starting eleven for City's 3–1 home win against Grimsby Town. The opening goal was scored by Tommy Tait after Wrightson's shot hit a post, but "shot lamentably when Tait unselfishly invited the newcomer to 'help himself' to his first goal". He played in three more matches that season without scoring; against Sheffield United he again disappointed the Manchester Guardian correspondent when he missed two "excellent" chances and showed he had "yet to discover the speed and nimbleness that distinguish City forwards." He improved, but his lack of success in front of goal meant he never established himself as a first-team regular. He scored four times from 22 first-team appearances, all in the league, and then, with the transfer deadline approaching, he signed for Fulham, who needed to strengthen their squad in an attempt to secure the Third Division South title and consequent promotion to the Second Division.

He played throughout what remained of the ultimately successful promotion campaign, scoring on debut against Brighton & Hove Albion, and adding two more goals, a header in a 2–1 win against Mansfield Town and the opening goal against Bournemouth & Boscombe Athletic. He played little in Fulham's 1932–33 Second Division season, bringing his totals to five goals from eighteen appearances, before moving on again after just a year with the club.

=== Exeter City ===
On the following deadline day, he and centre-half Harry Webb signed for Exeter City of the Third Division South for a club record fee paid. He again went straight into the starting eleven, and helped his side finish as runners-up. In 1933–34, he contributed to Exeter winning the Third Division South Cup. He was a member of the team that beat a Crystal Palace reserve side – the first team were otherwise engaged with special training in preparation for their FA Cup tie against Arsenal – by the unusual score of eleven goals to six, scored the winner against Brighton in the semi-final second replay, and was part of the team that beat local rivals Torquay United in the final.

Although reluctant to re-sign for another season, he did so, came into the team for the visit of Northampton Town, and scored all three goals, the last an intended cross that "sailed into the far corner". He "played with intelligence and enterprise throughout. The crowd were delighted at his success, not only because it meant victory for the team, but because they have always recognized in him a player who pulls his weight, often without any good fortune in scoring efforts." In November, he contributed two goals to Exeter's come back from 5–2 down to draw 5–5 at Bristol Rovers, and scored freely for the rest of the season.

With the transfer deadline approaching, the Western Morning News commented that "Throughout the season Wrightson has played consistently well, and has been the principal schemer of the City's danger moves. His shooting has been attended with marked success, and to date he heads the Exeter scorers with fifteen goals to his credit." They also expressed concern that, if interest from other clubs in Wrightson and fellow goalscorer Harry Poulter resulted in a serious offer for their services, the directors might make the mistake of accepting, which "would strike a heavy blow to Exeter City's prestige, and would probably result in a serious deterioration in the team's standard of play", thus potentially reducing attendances. He finished his Exeter career with 71 league appearances and 25 goals, most of which were scored in the 1934–35 season. He was included on Exeter's retained list but would not accept the terms offered, and at the end of May was placed on the transfer list.

=== Chester ===
Three weeks later, Wrightson signed for Chester of the Third Division North. He scored four goals in his first month with the club, and then none until 1 February 1936. Until arriving at Chester, he had played as an inside forward "of the scheming type", although "possess[ing] a powerful shot". Converted to centre forward, he embarked on a scoring spree that began with four against York City in a 12–0 win that remains both Chester's record win and York's record defeat – according to a feature in the York Press, Wrightson also hit the crossbar twice and missed two other good chances – continued with three in a 4–2 defeat of Barrow, and followed with a third hat-trick in consecutive matches – a feat performed only seven times in Football League history – as Chester beat New Brighton 8–2. The scoring run extended to eight consecutive matches and eighteen goals, and he finished the season as the club's top scorer, with 27 league and 11 cup goals, including the winner against Darlington, his former club, in the final of the Third Division North Cup.

He produced a further 32 league and 4 cup goals in 1936–37, and was proceeding in similar vein in 1937–38, with 14 league goals by the end of December, when injury disrupted his season. His services were again retained, but he made no more league appearances, and was released on a free transfer at the end of the 1938–39 season. The Chester Chronicle's sports editor wrote that "[Wrightson] has been so repeatedly in the wars this season that we had almost forgotten he was still with us. Anyway, he is due to leave Chester any time now. and we shall always remember him as a fine fellow and a great servant. I am sure I am expressing the sentiments of every Stadium patron when I wish him all success in the future." His 73 Football League goals stood as a club record for more than 40 years, and he remains third in their all-time scorers table.
