= Maurice Wellock =

English footballer

Personal information
- Full name: Maurice Wellock
- Date of birth: 15 June 1902
- Place of birth: Bradford, Yorkshire, England
- Date of death: 1967 (aged 64–65)
- Height: 5 ft 9 in (1.75 m)
- Positions: Centre forward; wing half

Youth career
- Bradford City

Senior career*
Years	Team	Apps	(Gls)
	Bradford City	0	(0)
1919–1923	Halifax Town	33	(3)
1923–1927	Blackpool	27	(7)
1927	Oldham Athletic	5	(6)
1927–1928	Torquay United	27	(3)
1928–1929	Peterborough & Fletton United		
1929–1932	Darlington	104	(71)
1932–1934	Halifax Town	82	(21)
- * Club domestic league appearances and goals

Maurice Wellock (15 June 1902 – 1967) was an English professional footballer who scored 111 goals from 278 appearances in the Football League.

== Life and career ==
Wellock was born in Bradford, Yorkshire, where he attended Drummond Road School. In 1916, he became the first Bradford boy to be capped for England in a schoolboy international. He began his senior career with hometown club Bradford City. He played for their first team in the wartime leagues at the age of fifteen, but never appeared once the Football League resumed after the war.

He had joined Halifax Town by 1919, and made his league debut in the 1921–22 season. He scored three times in 33 games for Halifax before moving to Blackpool in 1923. He was not a regular in the Blackpool side, playing 27 league games in which he scored seven times, and moved to Oldham Athletic in February 1927, scoring six goals in just five league games, including four on his debut in a 5–2 win away to Grimsby Town.

In June 1927, he joined newly promoted Torquay United, playing in Torquay's first ever game in the Football League, a 1–1 draw at home to local rivals Exeter City on 27 August 1927. He spent just one season with Torquay, scoring three times in 27 games before joining Southern League club Peterborough & Fletton United.

In 1929, he returned to the Football League with Darlington where he played regularly as a centre-forward, having played mainly as a defender with Torquay. He scored 71 goals, including five in one game against Rotherham United in 1930, in 104 league games for Darlington, finishing his career with a further 21 goals in 82 league games for Halifax Town.
