= Trevor Walters (footballer) =

Welsh footballer

Personal information
- Full name: Trevor Bowen Walters
- Date of birth: 13 January 1916
- Place of birth: Aberdare, Wales
- Date of death: 1 June 1989 (aged 73)
- Place of death: Chester, England
- Position: Centre half

Senior career*
Years	Team	Apps	(Gls)
1937–1949	Chester	151	(1)
- * Club domestic league appearances and goals

Trevor Bowen Walters (13 January 1916 – 1 June 1989) was a Welsh footballer, who played as a centre half in the Football League for Chester.
