= Arthur Gale =

English footballer

Personal information
- Full name: Arthur Reuben Gale
- Date of birth: 16 November 1904
- Place of birth: Salford, England
- Date of death: 13 May 1976 (aged 71)
- Place of death: Ashton upon Mersey, England
- Height: 5 ft 9 1/2 in (1.77 m)
- Position: Centre forward

Youth career
- South Salford Lads' Club

Senior career*
Years	Team	Apps	(Gls)
- Sedgley Park (Prestwich)
1925–1930	Bury	39	(5)
1930–1931	Chester	39	(73)
1931–1936	West Bromwich Albion	23	(18)
1936–1938	Chester	35	(16)
1938–1939	Macclesfield Town	29	(12)
1939	Accrington Stanley	0	(0)
1939–194?	Altrincham		
- * Club domestic league appearances and goals

Arthur Reuben Gale (16 November 1904 – 13 July 1976) was an English footballer who played as a forward in the Football League for Bury, West Bromwich Albion, Chester and Accrington Stanley.

== Life and career ==
Gale was born in 1904 in Salford. He played football for South Salford Lads' Club and Sedgley Park, from where he signed for First Division club Bury. He made his debut in 1926, but played infrequently for the first team – 39 appearances spread over five seasons of which two-thirds were in 1928–29 – and spent the 1930–31 season at Chester. In that season Gale scored more than 100 goals, of which no fewer than 73 came in Cheshire League matches. Chester were elected to the Football League for the 1931–32 season, and were willing to pay Bury the £400 asking price, but he was sold instead to First Division club West Bromwich Albion, who as part of the deal allowed their player Frank Cresswell to rejoin Chester.

He remained a fringe player at West Bromwich Albion, and the club encouraged him to continue in his chosen profession, as a schoolteacher in the Manchester area. He did however play a major role in their progress to the 1935 FA Cup Final. He came into the team in place of the injured Tommy Glidden, and scored in each round from third to sixth, but was dropped in favour of Glidden and the previously injured Joe Carter for the final against Sheffield Wednesday. Carter was injured early on, (Note: Tony Matthews' 1987 Albion! A Complete Record of West Bromwich Albion 1879–1987 mistakenly suggests that it was Glidden who was injured.) so Albion played much of the match with effectively ten men, and lost 4–2. In light of the circumstances, the Football Association agreed to award Gale a losers' medal. After five and a half seasons during which he made 23 league appearances and scored 18 league goals, he returned to Chester.

Less prolific and less of a regular in the side than before, Gale still produced 16 goals from 35 matches in the Third Division North – 11 from 16 in the 1937–38 season – before moving back to the Cheshire League with Macclesfield in October 1938. He finished as their top scorer for 1938–39, and earned himself a return to the Football League with Accrington Stanley, but did not play a league game before competitive football was abandoned for the duration of the war. He played and scored in the wartime competitions for Altrincham, and went on to act as the club's reserve team manager, first-team coach, assistant first-team manager and scout.

Gale became head of Lower Kersal Council School in Salford, where one of his pupils was the mountaineer Don Whillans. Gale died on 13 May 1976 at his home in Ashton upon Mersey, Greater Manchester, at the age of 71. (Note: Although the newspaper headline gave his age at death as 72, the vital dates make him 71.)
