= Bos Trevis =

English footballer

Personal information
- Full name: Arthur Stanley Sackville Redvers Trevor Boscawen Griffith Trevis
- Date of birth: 31 December 1910
- Place of birth: Blackheath, England
- Date of death: 1999 (aged 88–89)
- Height: 5 ft 9 in (1.75 m)

Senior career*
Years	Team	Apps	(Gls)
1934	West Bromwich Albion	1	(0)
1936–1939	Chester	29	(2)
- * Club domestic league appearances and goals

Bos Trevis (1911–1984) was an English footballer who played for West Bromwich Albion.
