= Bill Horsman (footballer) =

English footballer (1906–1982)

Personal information
- Full name: William Horsman
- Date of birth: 18 December 1906
- Place of birth: Doncaster, England
- Date of death: 1982 (aged 75–76)
- Height: 5 ft 6 1/2 in (1.69 m)
- Position: Outside right

Senior career*
Years	Team	Apps	(Gls)
- Selby Town
1928–1935	Birmingham	79	(3)
1935–1939	Chester	151	(34)
- * Club domestic league appearances and goals

William Horsman (18 December 1906 – 1982) was an English professional footballer who played as an outside right and scored 37 goals from 230 appearances in the Football League.

Horsman was born in Doncaster, West Riding of Yorkshire. He made 79 appearances in the First Division for Birmingham before joining Chester in 1935. He helped them finish as runners-up in the Third Division North in 1935–36 and reach the final of the Welsh Cup in the same season. His career was ended prematurely by the outbreak of the Second World War.
