= Percy Mackrill =

South African soccer player and manager

Personal information
- Full name: Percy A. Mackrill
- Date of birth: 19 October 1894
- Place of birth: Wynberg, Cape Colony
- Date of death: 1949
- Place of death: Halifax, England
- Height: 5 ft 8 in (1.73 m)
- Position: Left-back

Senior career*
Years	Team	Apps	(Gls)
1913–1915	Bradford Park Avenue	0	(0)
1915–1919	Rotherham County		
1919	Coventry City	1	(0)
1919–1923	Halifax Town	57	(0)
1923–1925	Pontypridd	?	(0)
1925–1929	Torquay United	6	(0)

Managerial career
- 1927–1929: Torquay United
- * Club domestic league appearances and goals

Percy A. Mackrill (born 19 October 1894 – 1949) was a Cape Colony-born footballer and football club manager.

== Career ==
Mackrill joined Bradford Park Avenue in the summer of 1913 and remained with them until the outbreak of war, though failed to make the first team. He spent the war years playing for Rotherham County.

He joined Coventry City in the summer of 1919 as Coventry began their first season in the Football League. However, he played just once before moving to Halifax Town later that year. Halifax were elected to the football league in 1921 and Mackrill played in their first ever league game, a 2–0 defeat away to eventual runners-up Darlington on 27 August 1921.

He played 57 league games for Halifax before leaving at the end of the 1922–23 season to join Pontypridd, where he spent two years before joining Torquay United in 1925. He later became player-manager and led Torquay to the Southern League title in 1927, which they won by 0.002 of a goal from Bristol City reserves. This earned them promotion to the Football League, Torquay winning election in place of Aberdare Athletic.

He left himself out of the starting line-up at the beginning of Torquay's first league season, preferring to play George Smith at left-back. However, after six games, Mackrill returned to the team, playing in the next six games before retiring as a player to concentrate on management, although the team was actually selected by the directors. Torquay finished in last place at the end of their first season in the Division Three (South) and he left in March 1929 with United struggling near the foot of the table once more.
