= List of Torquay United F.C. players =

Torquay United Football Club is an English professional association football club based in Torquay, Devon. This is a list of players who have made 100 or more competitive appearances for Torquay United. It includes all competitive first-team matches since the club was elected into the Football League in 1927, but does not include appearances made in Wartime Leagues or local cup competitions such as the Devon Bowl. Substitute appearances are included.

== History ==
After joining the Football League in 1927, the first player to make 100 appearances for Torquay United was Bob Smith. The former Plymouth Argyle left-half joined Torquay in 1928 and reached the century milestone in January 1931, narrowly beating full-back Jack Fowler to the honor by a few weeks. Despite this, Fowler would eventually overtake Smith and set the Torquay appearance record at 190 in 1934. However, the player with the most pre-War appearances for Torquay was Albert Hutchinson. Beginning his career as a forward, Hutchinson eventually played at every position for Torquay (including the goalkeeper) before the Football League was abandoned in September 1939, by which point he had notched up 338 appearances for the club.

Hutchinson's record was eventually broken by winger Ron Shaw in 1955, closely followed by wing-half Dennis Lewis. Lewis eventually overtook Shaw and retired in 1958 having set a record of 473 appearances which stood for almost 50 years. 1958 was also the year in which Sammy Collins set the club's goalscoring record at 219, a total which has yet to be surpassed. In the 1960s, Tommy Northcott came closest to matching both records with 150 goals in 443 games, while defender Ian Twitchin joined the elite band of players to make 400 appearances for United in 1980.

Dennis Lewis's record was eventually broken by Kevin Hill in 2008 when he came on as a late substitute in the FA Trophy Final to make his 474th and final appearance for Torquay. The current player with the most appearances for Torquay United is Dean Moxey, while Shaun MacDonald is the latest player to make 100 appearances for the club.

== Players with 100 or more appearances ==
Statistics correct as of 3 May 2014. Players marked in bold are still playing for the club.

Position key: GK – Goalkeeper; DF – Defender; MF – Midfielder; FW – Forward

| Name | Nationality | Position | Torquay career | Appearances | Goals | Notes |
|---|---|---|---|---|---|---|
| Jack Fowler | England | DF | 1928–1934 | 190 | 11 | |
| Bob Smith | England | MF | 1928–1932 | 147 | 3 | |
| Harry Waller | England | FW | 1928–1932 | 122 | 24 | |
| Albert Hutchinson | England | FW | 1930–1939 | 338 | 84 | |
| George Stabb | England | FW | 1931–1934 | 103 | 48 | |
| Lew Tapp | England | DF | 1931–1937 | 171 | 0 | |
| Percy Maggs | England | GK | 1932–1939 | 223 | 0 | |
| Leslie Lievesley | England | DF | 1933–1937 | 144 | 5 | |
| Jack Jones | Wales | MF | 1934–1938 | 170 | 8 | |
| Morton Morgan | Wales | FW | 1934–1937 | 133 | 26 | |
| Fred Beedall | England | FW | 1934–1938 | 132 | 21 | |
| Phil Joslin | England | GK | 1936–1948 | 149 | 0 | |
| Bert Head | England | DF | 1936–1950 | 242 | 6 | |
| Ralph Calland | England | DF | 1946–1953 | 222 | 13 | |
| Jack Conley | England | FW | 1946–1950 | 168 | 74 | |
| Bill Towers | England | DF | 1946–1955 | 292 | 0 | |
| Ron Shaw | England | MF | 1946–1958 | 412 | 106 | |
| Dennis Lewis | Wales | MF | 1947–1958 | 473 | 33 | |
| Hugh Cameron | Scotland | FW | 1948–1951 | 127 | 21 | |
| Sammy Collins | England | FW | 1948–1958 | 379 | 219 | |
| Dave Topping | Scotland | DF | 1948–1952 | 158 | 3 | |
| Tommy Northcott | England | FW | 1949–1952; 1957–1966 | 443 | 150 | |
| Don Mills | England | FW | 1949; 1952–1962 | 367 | 84 | |
| George Webber | Wales | GK | 1950–1954 | 123 | 0 | |
| Eric Webber | England | DF | 1951–1955 | 159 | 0 | |
| Griff Norman | Wales | MF | 1952–1958 | 234 | 6 | |
| Harold Dobbie | England | FW | 1953–1957 | 119 | 48 | |
| Graham Bond | England | FW | 1953–1962 | 142 | 54 | |
| Harry Smith | England | DF | 1953–1961 | 202 | 1 | |
| John V. Smith | England | DF | 1954–1960 | 179 | 0 | |
| George Northcott | England | DF | 1954–1962 | 172 | 2 | |
| John James | England | FW | 1955–1961 | 134 | 11 | |
| Mervyn Gill | England | GK | 1956–1962 | 174 | 0 | |
| Colin Bettany | England | DF | 1957–1966 | 361 | 4 | |
| Ernie Pym | England | MF | 1957–1965 | 307 | 94 | |
| Larry Baxter | England | MF | 1957–1962 | 181 | 22 | |
| Geoff Cox | England | MF | 1957–1967 | 286 | 68 | |
| Alan Smith | England | DF | 1957–1968 | 303 | 3 | |
| Dave Hancock | England | MF | 1959–1963 | 188 | 14 | |
| Terry Adlington | England | GK | 1962–1965 | 164 | 1 | |
| George Allen | England | DF | 1962–1965 | 146 | 0 | |
| Robin Stubbs | England | FW | 1963–1969; 1972–1973 | 263 | 133 | |
| John Benson | Scotland | DF | 1964–1970 | 265 | 8 | |
| Doug Clarke | England | MF | 1965–1968 | 131 | 22 | |
| Ron Barnes | England | MF | 1966–1969 | 127 | 26 | |
| John Bond | England | DF | 1966–1969 | 145 | 13 | |
| Bill Kitchener | England | DF | 1966–1967; 1967–1971 | 184 | 9 | |
| Jimmy Dunne | Republic of Ireland | DF/MF | 1967–1970; 1976–1979 | 274 | 19 | |
| Andy Donnelly | Scotland | GK | 1967–1971 | 178 | 0 | |
| Alan Welsh | Scotland | FW | 1967–1972 | 161 | 50 | |
| Micky Cave | England | MF | 1968–1971 | 129 | 21 | |
| Ken Sandercock | England | MF | 1968–1969; 1971–1974 | 180 | 6 | |
| John Rudge | England | FW | 1969–1972 | 110 | 40 | |
| Tommy Mitchinson | England | MF | 1969–1971 | 123 | 9 | |
| Phil Sandercock | England | DF | 1969–1977 | 225 | 13 | |
| Mal Lucas | Wales | DF | 1970–1974 | 135 | 3 | |
| Dick Edwards | England | DF | 1970–1973 | 116 | 7 | |
| Cliff Jackson | England | FW | 1970–1974 | 139 | 15 | |
| Ian Twitchin | England | DF | 1970–1981 | 435 | 17 | |
| Mike Mahoney | England | GK | 1970–1975 | 167 | 0 | |
| Derek Harrison | England | DF | 1971–1975 | 137 | 5 | |
| Clint Boulton | England | DF | 1971–1979 | 286 | 36 | |
| David Stocks | England | DF | 1972–1976 | 161 | 4 | |
| Steve Morrall | England | MF | 1972–1977 | 175 | 13 | |
| Dave Kennedy | England | MF | 1973–1977 | 166 | 8 | |
| Willie Brown | Scotland | FW | 1975–1978 | 154 | 56 | |
| Terry Lee | England | GK | 1975–1978 | 121 | 0 | |
| Les Lawrence | England | FW | 1977–1982 | 215 | 54 | |
| Peter Coffill | England | MF | 1977–1981 | 133 | 11 | |
| Steve Cooper | England | FW | 1978–1984 | 271 | 90 | |
| Donal Murphy | Republic of Ireland | MF | 1978–1980; 1981 | 100 | 22 | |
| John Turner | England | GK | 1978–1980; 1983–1984 | 128 | 0 | |
| Freddie Pethard | Scotland | DF | 1979–1982 | 119 | 0 | |
| Brian Wilson | England | DF | 1979–1983 | 151 | 8 | |
| Graham Jones | England | DF | 1980–1983 | 131 | 6 | |
| Vince O'Keefe | England | GK | 1980–1982 | 121 | 0 | |
| Colin Anderson | England | DF/MF | 1982–1985 | 124 | 11 | |
| John Impey | England | DF | 1983–1985; 1986–1988 | 154 | 3 | |
| Steve Pugh | England | DF | 1983–1986 | 137 | 5 | |
| Derek Dawkins | England | MF | 1984–1988 | 211 | 11 | |
| Paul Compton | England | DF | 1984–1986; 1991–1992 | 137 | 4 | |
| Kenny Allen | England | GK | 1984–1985; 1986–1988; 1989 | 158 | 0 | |
| Mark Loram | England | FW | 1985–1986; 1987–1992; 1993 | 332 | 63 | |
| Mario Walsh | England | FW | 1985–1987 | 113 | 23 | |
| Tom Kelly | Scotland | DF | 1986–1989; 1993–1996 | 290 | 8 | |
| Jim McNichol | Scotland | DF | 1986–1989; 1991 | 162 | 19 | |
| David Cole | England | DF | 1986–1989 | 139 | 7 | |
| Chris Myers | England | MF | 1986–1987; 1990–1993; 1993–1994 | 135 | 8 | |
| Phil Lloyd | England | DF | 1987–1992 | 217 | 11 | |
| Dean Edwards | England | FW | 1988–1991 | 155 | 34 | |
| Paul Holmes | England | DF | 1988–1992; 1999–2003 | 271 | 6 | |
| Sean William Joyce | England | MF | 1988–1993 | 194 | 17 | |
| Matt Elliott | Scotland | DF | 1989–1992 | 158 | 20 | |
| John Uzzell | England | DF | 1989–1991 | 115 | 5 | |
| Paul Hall | Jamaica | MF | 1989–1993 | 111 | 4 | |
| Chris Curran | England | DF | 1990–1995 | 185 | 5 | |
| Gareth Howells | England | GK | 1990–1992 | 105 | 0 | |
| Scott Colcombe | England | DF/MF | 1991–1995 | 108 | 2 | |
| Duane Darby | England | FW | 1991–1995 | 127 | 29 | |
| Darren Moore | Jamaica | DF | 1992–1995 | 124 | 11 | |
| Robbie Herrera | England | DF | 1992; 1998–2001 | 136 | 1 | |
| Paul Trollope | Wales | MF | 1992–1994 | 132 | 17 | |
| Lee Barrow | England | DF | 1993–1997 | 192 | 8 | |
| Richard Hancox | England | MF | 1993–1997; 2005 | 101 | 14 | |
| Ian Hathaway | England | MF | 1993–1997 | 166 | 17 | |
| Ashley Bayes | England | GK | 1993–1996 | 119 | 0 | |
| Tony Bedeau | Grenada | FW | 1995–2006; 2006–2007 | 373 | 65 | |
| Wayne Thomas | England | DF | 1995–2000 | 142 | 7 | |
| Alex Watson | England | DF | 1995–2001 | 230 | 9 | |
| Kevin Hill | England | MF | 1997–2008 | 474 | 57 | |
| Steve Tully | England | DF | 1997–2002 | 125 | 3 | |
| Jimmy Aggrey | England | DF | 1998–2001 | 110 | 2 | |
| Eifion Williams | Wales | FW | 1999–2002 | 122 | 24 | |
| Matthew Hockley | England | MF | 2000–2008 | 265 | 10 | |
| David Graham | Scotland | FW | 2001–2004; 2007 | 137 | 49 | |
| Alex Russell | England | MF | 2001–2005 | 163 | 21 | |
| Kevin Dearden | England | GK | 2001–2005 | 107 | 0 | |
| Steve Woods | England | DF | 2001–2009 | 283 | 11 | |
| Lee Canoville | England | DF | 2001–2005 | 121 | 2 | |
| Jason Fowler | England | MF | 2001–2005 | 107 | 8 | |
| Martin Gritton | Scotland | FW | 2002–2004; 2010–2011 | 115 | 26 | |
| Jo Kuffour | Ghana | FW | 2002–2006 | 160 | 33 | |
| Craig Taylor | England | DF | 2003–2005 | 138 | 6 | |
| Lee Mansell | England | MF | 2006–2014 | 391 | 25 | |
| Chris Robertson | Scotland | DF | 2007–2012 | 203 | 11 | |
| Elliot Benyon | England | FW | 2007–2011; 2013 | 199 | 47 | |
| Chris Hargreaves | England | MF | 2007–2010 | 130 | 14 | |
| Kevin Nicholson | England | DF | 2007–2014 | 345 | 13 | |
| Tim Sills | England | FW | 2007–2010 | 136 | 47 | |
| Danny Stevens | England | MF | 2007–2013; 2014 | 224 | 28 | |
| Chris Zebroski | England | FW | 2007–2008; 2009–2011 | 141 | 40 | |
| Mark Ellis | England | DF | 2007–2012; 2022–2023 | 149 | 15 | |
| Nicky Wroe | England | MF | 2008–2011 | 130 | 23 | |
| Michael Poke | England | GK | 2008; 2008–2009; 2009–2010; 2012–2014 | 124 | 0 | |
| Scott Bevan | England | GK | 2008–2011 | 112 | 0 | |
| Damon Lathrope | England | MF | 2010–2014; 2016–2018 | 157 | 0 | |
| Eunan O'Kane | Republic of Ireland | MF | 2010–2012 | 122 | 14 | |
| Joe Oastler | England | DF | 2010–2011; 2011–2013 | 113 | 1 | |
| Aaron Downes | Australia | DF | 2012–2015 | 109 | 15 | |
| Luke Young | England | MF | 2014–2018 | 132 | 16 | |
| Jamie Reid | Northern Ireland | FW | 2015; 2016–2017; 2017; 2017–2020 | 163 | 57 | |
| Ruairi Keating | Republic of Ireland | FW | 2017–2020 | 107 | 14 | |
| Connor Lemonheigh-Evans | Wales | MF | 2018; 2018–2019; 2019–2020; 2020–2022 | 149 | 26 | |
| Asa Hall | England | MF | 2018–2024 | 174 | 39 | |
| Ben Wynter | England | DF | 2018–2022 | 145 | 8 | |
| Dean Moxey | England | DF | 2020–2024 | 153 | 4 | |
| Jake Andrews | England | MF | 2018–2021 | 104 | 19 | |
| Courtney Richards | England | MF | 2014–2017 | 103 | 6 | |
| Kyle Cameron | Scotland | DF | 2018–2021 | 101 | 5 | |
| Shaun MacDonald | England | GK | 2018–2022 | 101 | 0 | |
