= List of Torquay United F.C. records and statistics =

Torquay United Football Club is an English professional association football club based in Torquay, Devon. This list details the major honours and achievements won by Torquay United as well as records set by the club, the players and the managers.

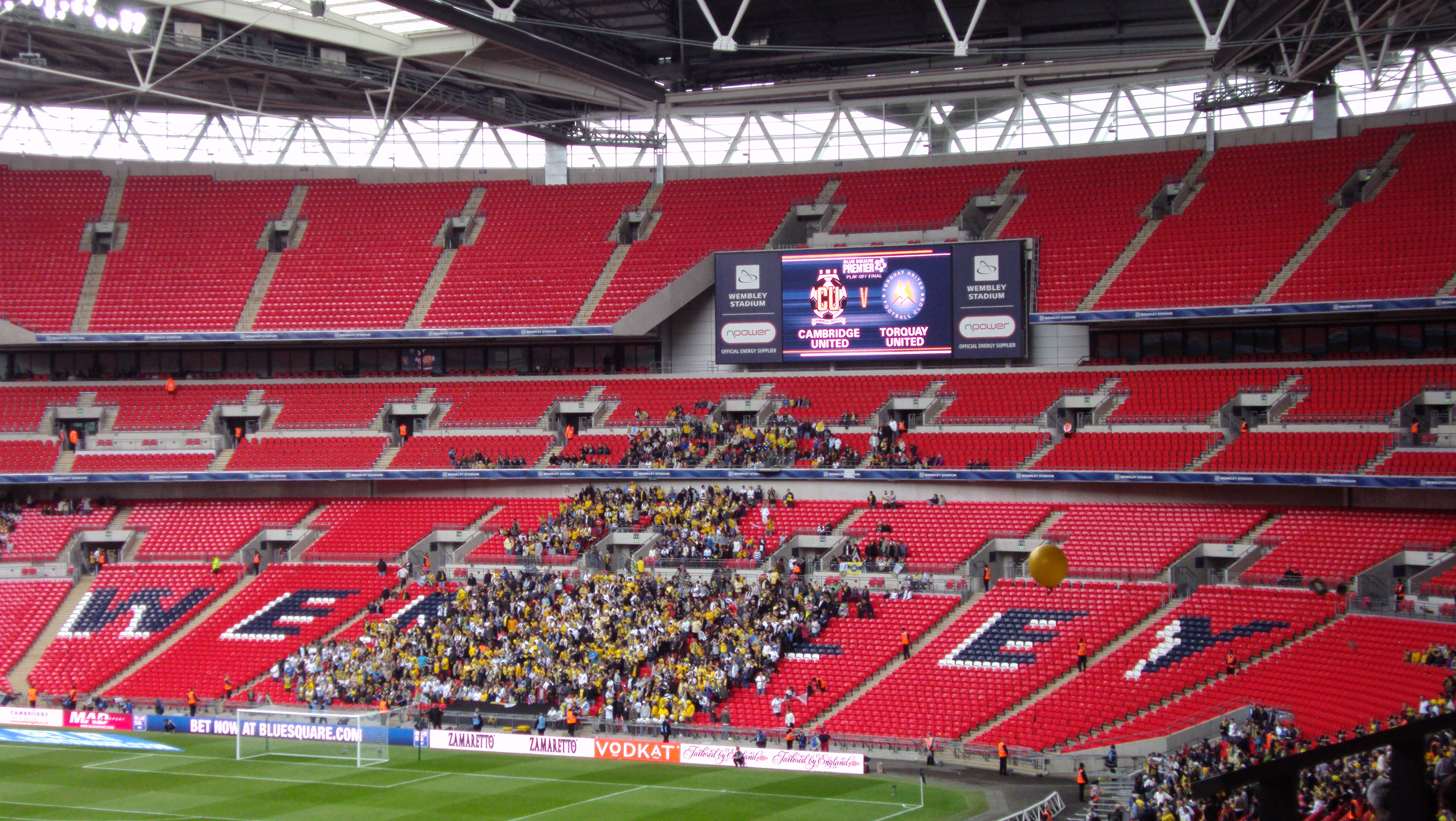
Torquay United fans at the 2009 Conference Premier play-off final

== Honours and achievements ==
Torquay United won their first honour in 1909 as champions of the Torquay & District League before winning the Plymouth & District League (when they were known as Torquay Town) in 1912. After merging with Babbacombe and reverting to the name of Torquay United, the club won the Southern League Western Section in 1927 as well as finishing runners-up in the Western League during the same season.

Since being elected into the Football League in 1927, Torquay United have yet to progress any further than the third tier of English football. United's highest ever League finish was when they were runners-up to Alf Ramsey's Ipswich Town in the Third Division South in 1957. After the Football League was expanded into four nationwide divisions in 1958, Torquay have spent most of their existence in the bottom section. However, United have won automatic promotion to the third division on three occasions (1960, 1966 and 2004) and promoted via the playoffs just once (in 1991). The 1991 Division Four play-off final was the second time Torquay United had played at Wembley Stadium having been runners-up to Bolton Wanderers in the 1989 Sherpa Van Trophy Final. Torquay would make a third appearance at Wembley in 1998 but were beaten again by Colchester United in the Division Three play-off final. Despite being relegated to the Football Conference in 2007, Torquay found themselves at the new Wembley Stadium the following year for the 2008 FA Trophy Final. Unfortunately, Torquay were destined to be the losing side again, being beaten this time by Ebbsfleet United. However, the club's fifth appearance at Wembley for the 2009 Conference National play-off final resulted in a victory against Cambridge United and ensured the club's return to the Football League after a two-year absence.

Torquay United have reached the fourth round of the FA Cup on seven occasions and the third round of the League Cup on four occasions. The club also progressed to the final of the short-lived Third Division South Cup in 1934 before losing to local rivals Exeter City. Unfortunately, despite also reaching the final again in 1939, the match was never played due to the outbreak of World War II. On a local level, Torquay have won the Devon Senior Cup twice (once under the name of Torquay Town) and the Devon Professional Bowl (and its successor the Devon St Luke's Bowl) on fifteen separate occasions.

=== Leagues ===
- League One / Division Three / Third Division South (level 3):
  - Runners-up (1): 1956–57
- League Two / Division Three / Division Four (level 4):
  - Promotion (3): 1959–60, 1965–66, 2003–04
  - Play-off winners (1): 1990–91
  - Play-off runners-up (3): 1987–88, 1997–98, 2010–11
- Conference Premier (level 5):
  - Play-off winners (1): 2008–09
- National League South (level 6):
  - Winners (1): 2018–19
- Wartime League South Western Division:
  - Runners-up (1): 1939–40
- Southern League Western Section:
  - Winners (1): 1926–27
- Western League:
  - Runners-up (1): 1926–27
- Plymouth & District League:
  - Winners (1): 1911–12
- Torquay & District League:
  - Winners (1): 1908–09
- East Devon League:
  - Runners-up (2): 1901–02, 1902–03

=== Cups ===
- FA Cup:
  - Fourth round (7): 1948–49, 1954–55, 1970–71, 1982–83, 1989–90, 2008–09, 2010–11
- League Cup:
  - Third round (4): 1967–68, 1971–72, 1975–76, 1976–77
- League Trophy:
  - Runners-up (1): 1988–89
- FA Trophy:
  - Runners-up (1): 2007–08
- Third Division South Cup:
  - Finalists (1): 1938–39
  - Runners-up (1): 1933–34
- Devon Senior Cup:
  - Winners (2): 1910–11, 1921–22
- Devon Professional Bowl:
  - Winners (12): 1934–35, 1935–36, 1936–37, 1945–46, 1947–48, 1948–49, 1954–55 (shared), 1957–58, 1960–61 (shared), 1969–70, 1970–71, 1971–72
- Devon St Luke's Bowl:
  - Winners (3): 1997–98, 2000–01 (shared), 2006–07

== Player records ==
=== Appearances ===
The player with the most appearances for Torquay United is Kevin Hill who made his 474th appearance for the club during the 2008 FA Trophy Final. He beat the previous record of 473 which had been held by Dennis Lewis since 1958. Only three other players, Ron Shaw, Tommy Northcott and Ian Twitchin, have made more than 400 appearances for United.

- Most appearances in all competitions: Kevin Hill, 474.
- Most League appearances: Dennis Lewis, 443.
- Most FA Cup appearances: Dennis Lewis and Kevin Hill, 30.
- Most League Cup appearances: Ian Twitchin, 25.
- Most consecutive appearances in all competitions: Dennis Lewis, 221 (22 November 1952–19 April 1957).
- Most consecutive League appearances: Dennis Lewis, 207 (29 November 1952–19 April 1957, Third Division South).
- Youngest first-team player: David Byng, 16 years 36 days (against Walsall, 14 August 1993, Division Three).
- Oldest first-team player: Frank Womack, 41 years 210 days (against Exeter City, 3 May 1930, Third Division South).

=== Most appearances ===
All competitive first team matches are included. Appearances as substitute are in brackets.

#	Name	Years	League	FA Cup	League Cup	Other	Total
1	(England) Kevin Hill	1997–2008	417 (58)	26 (4)	15 (1)	16 (4)	474 (67)
2	(Wales) Dennis Lewis	1947–1958	443 (0)	30 (0)	0 (0)	0 (0)	473 (0)
3	(England) Tommy Northcott	1949–1952; 1957–1966	410 (0)	25 (0)	8 (0)	0 (0)	443 (0)
4	(England) Ian Twitchin	1970–1981	400 (26)	15 (0)	20 (5)	0 (0)	435 (31)
5	(England) Ron Shaw	1947–1958	384 (0)	28 (0)	0 (0)	0 (0)	412 (0)
6	(England) Lee Mansell	2006–2014	339 (9)	21 (0)	5 (0)	16 (1)	389 (10)
7	(England) Sammy Collins	1948–1958	356 (0)	23 (0)	0 (0)	0 (0)	379 (0)
8	(Grenada) Tony Bedeau	1995–2006; 2007–2008	327 (81)	20 (4)	9 (0)	17 (11)	373 (96)
9	(England) Don Mills	1949; 1952–1962	342 (0)	23 (0)	2 (0)	0 (0)	367 (0)
10	(England) Colin Bettany	1957–1965	335 (0)	16 (0)	10 (0)	0 (0)	361 (0)

=== Goalscorers ===
Sammy Collins has held the club's goalscoring record since 1958 with 219 in all competitions. Ron Shaw, Tommy Northcott and Robin Stubbs are the only other players to have scored more than 100 goals for Torquay.

- Most goals in all competitions: Sammy Collins, 219.
- Most League goals: Sammy Collins, 204.
- Most FA Cup goals: Sammy Collins, 15.
- Most League Cup goals: Willie Brown, 7.
- Most goals in a single season: Sammy Collins, 42 (1955–56).
- Most goals in a single match: Robin Stubbs, 5 (against Newport County, 19 October 1963, Division Four).
- Most League hat-tricks: Sammy Collins, 8.
- Youngest goalscorer: David Byng, 16 years 36 days (against Walsall, 14 August 1993, Division Three).

=== Top goalscorers ===
All competitive first-team matches are included. Appearances, including those as a substitute, are in brackets.

#	Name	Years	League	FA Cup	League Cup	Other	Total
1	(England) Sammy Collins	1948–1958	204 (356)	15 (23)	0 (0)	0 (0)	219 (379)
2	(England) Tommy Northcott	1949–1952; 1957–1966	136 (410)	13 (25)	1 (8)	0 (0)	150 (443)
3	(England) Robin Stubbs	1963–1969; 1971–1973	121 (238)	8 (12)	4 (13)	0 (0)	133 (263)
4	(England) Ron Shaw	1947–1958	99 (384)	7 (28)	0 (0)	0 (0)	106 (412)
5	(England) Ernie Pym	1957–1965	83 (284)	10 (15)	1 (8)	0 (0)	94 (307)
6	(England) Steve Cooper	1977–1984	76 (234)	7 (17)	4 (15)	3 (5)	90 (271)
7	(England) Albert Hutchinson	1930–1939	80 (317)	2 (15)	0 (0)	2 (6)	84 (338)
8	(England) Don Mills	1949; 1952–1962	81 (342)	2 (23)	1 (2)	0 (0)	84 (367)
9	(England) Jack Conley	1939–1951	72 (156)	2 (12)	0 (0)	0 (0)	74 (168)
10	(England) Geoff Cox	1957–1967	62 (261)	4 (17)	2 (8)	0 (0)	68 (286)

=== International caps ===
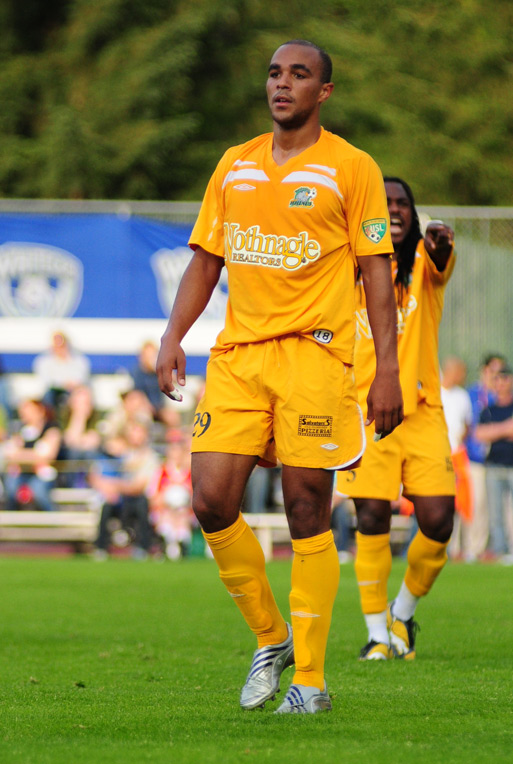
Taiwo Atieno is the most recent player to receive an international cap while playing for Torquay United.

Only seven players, Tony Bedeau, Rodney Jack, Gregory Goodridge, Taiwo Atieno, Jake Gosling, Jamie Robba, Samir Nabi and, most recently, Dillon De Silva have been capped while playing for Torquay United. However, a number of players have gone on to represent their countries after leaving Torquay. The earliest of these was Dartmouth born Ralph Birkett who played for United for three years before leaving for Arsenal in 1933 and eventually being capped by England in 1935. Future Liverpool manager Don Welsh also developed his career at Plainmoor before receiving the first of his three England caps in 1938.

In the 1980s, a young Lee Sharpe broke into the Torquay first team before being signed by Manchester United and subsequently appearing for England, while Keith Curle was also capped after playing for United. Matt Elliott, Paul Hall, Darren Moore and Paul Trollope have all represented their countries after leaving Plainmoor in the 1990s while, more recently, Jamie Ward was selected for Northern Ireland in 2011. In addition, several players have had loan spells at Torquay before being capped at international level, notably Steve Bould, Ívar Ingimarsson, Alan McLoughlin and Jason Roberts.

==== Players capped while at Torquay United ====
Barbados

- Gregory Goodridge

Gibraltar

- Jake Gosling
- Jamie Robba

Grenada

- Tony Bedeau

Kenya

- Taiwo Atieno

Pakistan

- Samir Nabi

Saint Vincent and the Grenadines

- Rodney Jack

Sri Lanka

- Dillon De Silva

==== Players capped after leaving Torquay United ====
England
- Ralph Birkett
- Steve Bould
- Keith Curle
- Lee Sharpe
- Don Welsh

Northern Ireland
- Jamie Ward

Republic of Ireland
- Tom Davis
- Jimmy Dunne
- Alan Lee
- Alan McLoughlin
- Eunan O'Kane

Scotland
- Matt Elliott

Wales
- Billy Bodin
- Kieffer Moore
- Paul Trollope

(The Gambia) Gambia
- Mustapha Carayol

Grenada
- Jason Roberts

Guyana
- Sam Cox

Iceland
- Axel Óskar Andrésson
- Ívar Ingimarsson

Jamaica
- Narada Bernard
- Paul Hall
- Darren Moore

New Zealand
- Tony Levy
- Colin Walker

Saint Vincent and the Grenadines
- Jazzi Barnum-Bobb

Trinidad and Tobago
- Jake Thomson

United States
- Juergen Sommer

=== Transfer fees ===
==== Record transfer fees paid ====
#	Name	Fee	Paid to	Date	Notes
1	(England) Leon Constantine	£75,000	Peterborough United	10 December 2004	
2	(Wales) Eifion Williams	£70,000	Barry Town	25 March 1999	
3	(England) Wes Saunders	£60,000	Dundee	July 1990	

==== Record transfer fees received ====
#	Name	Fee	Received from	Date	Notes
1	(Saint Vincent and the Grenadines) Rodney Jack	£600,000	Crewe Alexandra	17 July 1998	
2	(England) Matt Gregg	£400,000	Crystal Palace	15 October 1998	
3	(Austria) Bobby Olejnik	£300,000	Peterborough United	18 June 2012	

== Managerial records ==
- First manager: Crad Evans, appointed player-manager in 1921.
- Longest serving manager: Eric Webber, managed the club from 1951 until 1965.

== Club records ==
=== Firsts ===
- First match: Torquay United 5–0 Upton Cricket Club, 16 September 1899, Friendly.
- First FA Cup match: Green Waves 0–2 Torquay Town, 1 October 1910, First round qualifying.
- First FA Cup match (proper): Torquay United 1–1 Reading, 28 November 1925, First round.
- First Football League match: Torquay United 1–1 Exeter City, 27 August 1927, Third Division South.
- First League Cup match: Plymouth Argyle 1–1 Torquay United, 2 November 1960, Second round.

=== Wins ===
- Record win: 9–0 against Swindon Town (8 March 1952, Third Division South).
- Record FA Cup win: 7–0 against Lymington Town (22 September 2018, Second qualifying round).
- Record League Cup win: 5–0 against Hereford United (25 August 1992, First round Second Leg).
- Most League wins in a season: 27 in 42 matches (2018–19 Conference National South).
- Fewest League wins in a season: 5 in 46 matches (1995–96 Division Three).

=== Defeats ===
- Record defeat: 2–10 against Fulham (7 September 1931, Third Division South) and against Luton Town (2 September 1933, Third Division South).
- Record FA Cup defeat: 1–7 against Birmingham City (7 January 1956, Third round).
- Record League Cup defeat: 1–7 against Oldham Athletic (24 September 1991, Second round First Leg).
- Most League defeats in a season: 27 in 46 matches (1985–86 Division Four and 1995–96 Division Three).
- Fewest League defeats in a season: 8 in 42 matches (2018–19 Conference National South).

=== Draws ===
- Most League draws in a season: 18 in 46 matches (1986–87 Division Four, 1990–91 Division Four and 2002–03 Division Three).
- Fewest League draws in a season: 5 in 46 matches (1980–81 Division Four).

=== Goals ===
- Most League goals scored in a season: 93 in 42 matches (2018–19 Conference National South).
- Fewest League goals scored in a season: 30 in 46 matches (1995–96 Division Three).
- Most League goals conceded in a season: 106 in 42 matches (1931–32 Third Division South).
- Fewest League goals conceded in a season: 41 in 46 matches (1987–88 Division Four).
- Fastest own goal: 8 seconds, by Pat Kruse against Cambridge United in 1977.

=== Points ===
- Most points in a season:

Two points for a win: 60 in 46 matches (1959–60 Division Four).
Three points for a win: 88 in 42 matches (2018–19 Conference National South).

- Fewest points in a season:

Two points for a win: 30 in 42 matches (1927–28 Third Division South and 1937–38 Third Division South).
Three points for a win: 29 in 46 matches (1995–96 Division Three).

=== Sequences ===
- Most consecutive League wins: 8 matches (24 January–3 March 1998, Division Three).
- Most consecutive League defeats: 8 matches (26 March–21 April 1948, Third Division South; 29 September–6 November 1971, Division Three and 30 September–18 November 1995, Division Three).
- Most consecutive League draws: 8 matches (25 October–13 December 1969, Division Three).
- Most consecutive games without defeat in all competitions: 17 matches (7 September–29 November 2008).
- Most consecutive League games without defeat: 15 matches (14 September–10 December 1960, Division Three and 5 May–3 November 1990, Division Four).
- Most consecutive League games without a win: 19 matches (23 September 2006–20 January 2007, League Two).
- Most consecutive League clean sheets: 10 matches (5 April–21 August 2010, League Two).
- Longest run without conceding a goal: 998 minutes (3 April–28 August 2010, League Two).

=== Attendances ===
- Record highest attendance: 21,908 against Huddersfield Town (29 January 1955, FA Cup Fourth round).
- Highest League attendance: 16,454 against Plymouth Argyle (7 October 1950, Third Division South).
- Highest League Cup attendance: 20,100 against Tottenham Hotspur (6 October 1971, Third round).
- Highest away attendance: 55,081 against Tottenham Hotspur at White Hart Lane (18 January 1965, FA Cup Third round replay).
- Highest neutral ground attendance: 46,513 against Bolton Wanderers at Wembley Stadium (28 May 1989, League Trophy Final).
- Record lowest attendance: 520 against Shrewsbury Town (16 January 1991, League Trophy Preliminary round).
- Lowest League attendance: 850 against Crewe Alexandra (1 March 1986, Division Four).
- Lowest FA Cup attendance: 1,429 against Windsor & Eton (19 November 1985, First round replay).
- Lowest League Cup attendance: 1,100 against Swindon Town (2 September 1986, First round Second Leg).

== See also ==
- Football records in England
