= Northcott =

Northcott may refer to:

People

- Bayan Northcott (1940–2022), English composer
- Charles Northcott, Anglican priest in Ireland
- Clarence Northcott (1880-1968), Australian sociologist
- Deryl Northcott, New Zealand accounting academic
- Douglas Northcott (1916–2005), British mathematician
- Elliott Northcott (1869-1946), United States circuit judge
- George Northcott (1935-2010), English footballer
- Gordon Stewart Northcott (1906–1930), Canadian serial killer
- Gustavus A. Northcott (1861–1938), American politician
- Hamish Northcott (1992-), New Zealand rugby union player
- Heidi Northcott (1992-). Canadian baseball player
- John Northcott (1890–1966), Australian general
- Jordan Northcott (2002), Scottish footballer
- Lawrence Northcott (1908–1986), Canadian ice hockey player
- Michael Northcott (born 1955), British theologian and professor of Ethics
- Ron Northcott (1935–2023), Canadian curling player
- Ruth J. Northcott (1913–1969), Canadian astronomer
- Tom Northcott (born 1943), Canadian folk-rock singer
- Tommy Northcott (1931–2008), English footballer
- William Northcott (1854-1917), American politician

Other uses

- Northcott, Cornwall, a hamlet in England
- Cold Northcott, a hamlet in Cornwall, England
- Northcott, East Devon, a location in Devon, England
- Northcott, Mid Devon, a location in Devon, England
- Northcott, Torridge, a village and civil parish in Devon, England
- Northcott Disability Services also known as The NSW Society for Crippled Children or The Northcott Society
- Northcott Theatre at University of Exeter, England
- Northcott Municipal Council, original name for the first City of South Sydney
- Electoral district of Northcott, Australia
- 3670 Northcott, asteroid

== See also ==
- Charaxes northcotti, a species of butterfly
- Baldy Northcott Trophy, Canadian ice hockey series
