= Calland =

Calland may refer to:

- Albert Calland (1952–2023), United States Navy
- Albert Calland (footballer) (1929–2014), English professional footballer
- Frederic Calland Williams (1911–1977), English engineer
- Lee Calland (born 1941), NFL football player
- Leo Calland (1901–1984), American football and basketball player and coach
- Matt Calland (born 1971), head coach at Halifax RLFC
- Ralph Calland (1916–2005), English professional footballer
- Ted Calland (1932–1995), English professional footballer
