= The Duke of Dorchester =

American professional wrestler (1943–2026)

Personal information
- Born: January 18, 1943 Dorchester, Massachusetts, U.S.
- Died: June 16, 2026 (aged 83) Boston, Massachusetts, U.S.

Professional wrestling career
- Ring name(s): The Duke of Dorchester; Golden Terror; The Designated Hitman; Pete Dougherty; Pete Doherty
- Billed height: 6 ft 1 in (1.85 m)
- Billed weight: 246 lb (112 kg)
- Billed from: Dorchester, Massachusetts, U.S.
- Debut: 1971
- Retired: 1997

Pete Doherty (January 18, 1943 – June 16, 2026) was an American professional wrestler and television commentator known by his ring name The Duke of Dorchester.

== Professional wrestling career ==
=== Early Career (1971–1973) ===
Doherty began his career in 1971, wrestling for Vince McMahon Sr. in the World Wide Wrestling Federation (WWWF). At the time, McMahon's territory consisted of only the Northeast states, and Doherty wrestled all over in small and large venues. His first recorded match came on June 15, 1973 when he defeated Joe Turco at a house show in Albany, NY.

=== WWWF (1973–1977) ===
Doherty wrestled under the name, "The Duke of Dorchester" paying homage to his hometown of Dorchester, Massachusetts. The name was earned when Doherty, who maintained a normal job with General Dynamics while beginning his wrestling career, showed up late for an event and was sarcastically met by Chief Jay Strongbow, who stated "Well, well, well, if it isn't the friggin’ Duke of Dorchester. It's about time you got here.” The Duke was generally relegated to undercard status either wrestling against the stars of his era or against other undercard "jobbers". In his first year of WWWF competition, Doherty enjoyed a degree of success, gaining victories over Pancho Valdez and Dean Ross. His first defeat came on September 21, 1973, when he was beaten by Tony Altimore in Albany.

He opened 1974 with his first televised match, falling to Otto Von Heller at an All Star Wrestling taping on January 2. This was followed by a loss to Nikolai Volkoff in Bangor, ME, but Doherty then defeated Turco in rematches, as well as gaining victories over Mr X, Chuck Richards, and Johnny Rodz. He made another televised appearance on All Star Wrestling on July 13, 1974, facing Jack Evans in an unsuccessful effort. On August 3, the WWWF made its first ever appearance at the Philadelphia Spectrum, and Doherty wrestled Larry Zbyszko on the opening match of the card.

Doherty entered 1975 as a young veteran, but still mired in the undercard. After spending the previous two years trading wins and draws with other undercard performers, he was placed more frequently against higher-tier performers. Doherty was defeated by The Wolfman, Blackjack Mulligan, Blackjack Lanza, and Butcher Vachon in matches taking place that spring. He returned to television on June 21, teaming with Davey O' Hannon in a loss to Spiros Arion & Waldo Von Erich, which saw the heel team pummel their opponents afterward. On November 29, he faced a young Kevin Sullivan in Boston, MA, but was defeated.

He began 1976 with losses to Gene Dupree and Man Mountain Mike on the house show circuit, and would not secure his first victory until he defeated Tony Altimore in North Attleboro, Massachusetts on July 30. Doherty returned to television on August 10 on Championship Wrestling, teaming with Baron Mikel Scicluna in a loss to Chief Jay Strongbow & Billy White Wolf. Three years after entering the company, Doherty was promoted to make his first appearance at the WWWF's centerpiece promotional venue, Madison Square Garden. Making his debut at MSG on October 4, 1976, he was defeated by S. D. Jones.

However, his in-ring push remained the same; Doherty opened 1977 with losses to Johnny Rodz, WWWF Tag-Team Champion Billy White Wolf, Larry Zbyszko, and Doug Gilbert before finally rebounding to defeat Pinky Larson on February 4 at a house show in North Attleboro, MA. On the February 19th taping of Championship Wrestling he teamed with Jose Estrada in a defeat to Bob Backlund & Tony Garea. On March 7, he was defeated by Dusty Rhodes in the latter's debut at Madison Square Garden. On July 9, he faced Peter Miavia on Championship Wrestling, and two weeks later was defeated by Bob Backhand on the same program.

=== The Golden Terror (1977–1978) ===
On the September 10, 1977 episode of Championship Wrestling, Doherty made his debut as a masked wrestler named The Golden Terror. Managed by Captain Lou Albano, the Terror defeated Johnny Rivera with an abdominal claw. A week later the Terror also defeated Ted Adams, and on the September 24th episode he defeated Steve King. Doherty extended his winning streak to five matches when he defeated Lenny Hurst and Pete Austin on the parallel All Star Wrestling tapings in September, and then took it to seven matches after defeating Pierre Lefebvre and Lenny Hurst at a Championship Wrestling taping on September 27. On October 7, the Golden Terror won a $3,000, fourteen man battle royal at a house show in North Attleboro, MA. He also defeated Steve King to bring his winning streak to ten matches.

Doherty's winning streak was snapped at fourteen matches when he was defeated by Tony Garea at house show in Danbury, CT on October 25. This was his only loss at that point, as he continued to be undefeated on television and at other house shows, defeating various undercard performers. On the December 17th edition of Championship Wrestling he defeated Johnny Rivera. In December his push began to wane. On December 2nd, the Terror sustained his second singles loss when he was defeated by Bob Backlund at a house show in New London, CT. On December 12, he was defeated by Gorilla Monsoon in Boston, MA. On December 19 he wrestled Dominic DeNucci in Madison Square Garden, battling to a double countout.

On January 14, 1978, the Terror sustained his first televised loss, losing to Bob Backlund via countout on Championship Wrestling. On January 14 on All Star Wrestling he battled S. D. Jones to a draw, and a week later on the show suffered his first television pinfall when he was defeated by Tony Garea. On January 23, 1978, he was beaten by Dusty Rhodes in Madison Square Garden, and this presaged a move back towards the undercard for the masked Doherty. By March, he was losing televised matches to Peter Miavia and teaming with Baron Mikel Scicluna in a defeat to Dino Bravo & Dominic DeNucci. On the March 25, 1978 episode of All Star Wrestling, he lost to Larry Zbyszko when he refused to release an abdominal claw. This set up a house show feud between Zybysko and the Terror, of which the former was successful. Doherty would also face Peter Miavia, Dino Bravo, and Domini DeNucci in multiple house show matches that spring.

On April 24, the masked Golden Terror faced the legendary masked luchador Mil Mascaras at Madison Square Garden. After Mascaras won the encounter, he unmasked his opponent, revealing that the Terror was Pete Doherty to the fans in attendance. The unmasking was unacknowledged on television, and after redonning the mask, on the May 13th episode of Championship Wrestling, the Terror teamed with Strong Kobayashi in an unsuccessful challenge of WWF Tag-Team Champions Dino Bravo & Dominic DeNucci. The same day on All Star Wrestling, the Terror challenged Bravo & DeNucci again, this time teaming with Tank Patton, again falling in defeat. The Terror & Kobayashi received a rematch against the champions on the May 20th episode of Championship Wrestling but were again defeated. His last match under the match came on June 24, 1978, when he was beaten by Frankie Williams at a house show in Springfield, MA, after which he left the promotion.

=== WWWF/WWF (1978–1983) ===
After a brief stint in Georgia Championship Wrestling in the summer of 1978 that saw him face Rick McGraw in August, GA, Doherty returned sans mask to the WWWF on November 17, 1978 to wrestle Sylvano Sousa to a draw at an event in North Attleboro, MA. Wrestling once again as "Pete Doherty", he returned to the Boston Garden on December 4, 1978 and was defeated by Johnny Rodz. He began 1979 on a winning streak, beating Mike Paidousis, Sylvano Sousa, Frank Rodriguez, Mark Tendler, and Mike Hall before losing to then WWF Tag-Team Champion Larry Zbyszko. Doherty wrestled exclusively on house shows until June 1979; on June 30 edition of Championship Wrestling he made his televised return in a defeat to Dominic DeNucci. The same day on All Star Wrestling he was beaten by Ivan Putski. On December 1, he teamed with Moose Monroe in a losing effort against WWF Tag-Team Champions Tito Santana & Ivan Putski.

As the 1980s began, Doherty remained an "enhancement talent" for the now-renamed World Wrestling Federation. However, the Duke did score numerous victories against fellow preliminary wrestlers like Fred Marzino and Jose Luis Rivera, including The Duke defeating Marzino twenty-eight times with no wins scored by Marzino. The Duke was known in the ring for his long blond hair, missing teeth, and wild mannerisms. The Duke's constant, in-ring banter and screaming, could be heard in the last row of the arena. His signature "move" was getting stuck in a full nelson and then placing his legs on the top rope in order for his opponent to have to break the hold. The end result was that the opponent would release and The Duke would land on his head.

On May 1, 1980, Doherty teamed with occasional tag partner Sylvano Sousa to face Hulk Hogan in a handicap match in Worcester, MA. After facing Rick McGraw on house shows throughout the year, Doherty teamed with his former opponent on December 11, 1980 in a loss to the Moondogs. The next year was similar to the past, with Doherty remaining an undercard performer and trading victories with fellow underneath talent. On May 30, 1981, he returned to Boston and battled Don Serrano to a fifteen-minute draw. On June 13, he faced WWF Intercontinental Heavyweight Champion Pedro Morales on Championship Wrestling and was defeated. In July 1981, Doherty began a house show series with a young Curt Hennig and was winless.

In October 1981, Doherty donned a mask once more and wrestled as The Executioner. Debuing the gimmick at a house show on October 9 in New Bedford, MA, he was defeated by Joe Cox. After discarding the mask once more, Doherty ended the year on a lengthy losing streak that continued into 1982 with losses to Charlie Fulton, Johnny Rodz, Ivan Putski, Tony Altimore, Pete Mitchell, Rick McGraw, and S. D. Jones. While wrestling frequently on house shows, Doherty remained off of television until the May 14, 1983, episode of Championship Wrestling where he was defeated by Rocky Johnson. A week later on the same program, he was beaten by Tito Santana. His bookings - already frequent - began to pick up as the year continued, and he found himself frequently facing S. D. Jones on the house show circuit. On May 15, 1983, he unsuccessfully challenged WWF World Heavyweight Champion Bob Backlund at an event in Torrington, CT.

Always a valuable roster piece, Doherty became even more valuable as he pulled double duty on more than once show. The same day that he faced Bob Backlund, the Duke also wrestled at another house show in Tumbull, CT and faced both S. D. Jones and Chief Jay Strongbow in separate matches on the same card. Ten days later in Plymouth Meeting, PA, he substituted for Charlie Fulton and wrestled Barry Hart (Barry Horowitz) to a draw, then later teamed with Iron Mike Sharpe against Don Kernodle & Barry Hart later that night. On June 10, 1983, Doherty defeated Samula (Samu) by countout at an event in Portland, ME. In the summer of 1983 he began a house show series with Butcher Vachon, and closed out the year by defeating Chuck Tanner in Boston Gardens on December 10.

=== WWF Golden Era (1983–1992) ===
As 1984 began, the World Wrestling Federation's national expansion was underway with Hulk Hogan as its aegis. Now referred to as the WWF's "Golden Era", Doherty remained a consistent performer that saw his utilization expand as the years progressed. On the March 25, 1984 episode of Wrestling at the Chase, he faced Jimmy Snuka and was defeated. On the May 20th episode of the same program, he wrestled old opponent Mil Mascaras. After the WWF acquired Georgia Championship Wrestling, Doherty teamed with Ron Shaw & Butcher Vachon to face The Fabulous Freebirds (Michael Hayes, Terry Gordy, and Buddy Roberts in a two out of three falls match from Madison Square Garden that was aired on Georgia Championship Wrestling on TBS.

On January 5, 1985, the Duke faced Bret Hart in his old Boston Gardens stomping grounds and was defeated. On the April 26, 1985 episode of Tuesday Night Titans, Doherty was featured along with other wrestlers in an episode dedicated to the "Unsung Heroes" of the WWF. On May 11, 1985, he appeared on WWF's Saturday Night's Main Event I. The Duke lost a match to the Junkyard Dog. On June 25 on Prime Time Wrestling, Doherty defeated Mario Mancini. On the July 14, 1986 episode of Prime Time Wrestling, he wrestled The Tongan Kid (Tama) and was defeated. On August 25 on Prime Time Wrestling, he was defeated by the newly arrived Dick Slaytor. Doherty wrestled on the first-ever taping of WWF Superstars of Wrestling, teaming with Ron Shaw in a loss to Hillbilly Jim and Cousin Luke in match that aired on September 6, 1986. On September 30 on Prime Time Wrestling, he was defeated by Sivi Afi.

Doherty began 1987 by winning a $50K battle royal in Springfield, MA on January 4. He then appeared on Prime Time Wrestling, losing to Mike Rotundo. Despite being a heel, The Duke then had a short feud with fellow heel wrestler King Kong Bundy. On the January 19th edition of Prime Time Wrestling, Doherty participated in a battle royal and was eliminated; afterwards Doherty came back into the ring with a steel chair and assisted in eliminating Bundy. On the February 16th edition of Prime Time, Bundy defeated Doherty via disqualification after being hit with a steel chair once again. In addition to feuding with Bundy, the heel Doherty also had a match with fellow rulebreaker Sika on May 11, 1987 on Prime Time, this time being pinned.

On August 22, 1987, in a backstage interview segment at a televised Madison Square Garden event, Gorilla Monsoon conducted a backstage and revealed that The Duke had joined the WWF's broadcast team. Vince McMahon had placed Doherty in the broadcasting booth with The Duke announcing several WWF events around the US, but mostly in Boston as a heel commentator, usually alongside the likes of Gorilla Monsoon and Lord Alfred Hayes in Boston and Bruce Prichard and Mike McGuirk (and sometimes Bobby "The Brain" Heenan) around the country.

Doherty's appearances thus became much more sporadic; his next match would not come until the December 31, 1987 episode of Prime Time Wrestling when he was beaten by Koko B. Ware. The Duke had several grudge matches against the likes of S. D. Jones, "Leaping" Lanny Poffo and Scott Casey, even gaining a win over Poffo in his hometown of Boston. His feud with Jones began after he got a fluke win on the May 16, 1988 episode of Prime Time Wrestling following a losing streak the announcers alleged had reached 300. Doherty closed out the year with a loss to fellow heel Akeem on the December 12th edition of Prime Time Wrestling.

The heel versus heel dynamic continued in 1989; Doherty would lose to Rick Rude at a house show in Providence, RI on February 4, 1989, and sixteen days later to Bad News Brown on Prime Time Wrestling. In June 1989, Doherty appeared in the WWF-produced movie No Holds Barred, performing as "Klondike Kramer". He next wrestled on the August 12th edition of WWF Superstars in a defeat to Tito Santana.

As the 1990s began, Doherty continued to perform for the WWF, albeit on a reduced schedule. He opened the year with losses to Hercules, Mark Young, Hillbilly Jim, and Tito Santana. On April 27, 1990, he wrestled Haku in Boston Gardens and was pinned; however, on July 14, 1990, Doherty secured the biggest win of his career when he pinned the former tag team champion Haku in a rematch at the same venue. On the July 29, 1991 episode of WWF Superstars he was defeated by "The Texas Tornado" Kerry Von Erich, and on the September 1st episode of the program fell to Koko B. Ware once more. On September 7, 1991, Doherty competed in the King of the Ring tournament as a substitute for Kerry Von Erich, but was eliminated in the first round when he was defeated in just 33 seconds by Bret "Hitman" Hart.

Doherty wrestled for the last time in the Boston Gardens on September 28, 1991, losing to Kerry Von Erich. His final WWF match came on July 19, 1992 when he faced The Latin Fury (Konnan) at a house show in Hyannis, MA. The Duke retired from wrestling in 1997, making occasional appearances at local events including the WWF's final event at the old Boston Garden. In April 2010, Doherty was inducted into the New England Pro Wrestling Hall of Fame.

== Personal life and death ==
Doherty attended Hyde Park High School, served in the United States Army, and later earned an Associate Degree in Business from Newbury College. A play based on Doherty's life appeared at the New York International Fringe Festival in 2013.

Doherty died at Beth Israel Deaconess Medical Center, Boston, on June 16, 2026, at the age of 83.

== Awards and accomplishments ==
- New England Pro Wrestling Hall of Fame
  - Class of 2010
