= Terry Adlington =

English footballer

Personal information
- Full name: Terence Adlington
- Date of birth: 21 November 1935
- Place of birth: Blackwell, Derbyshire, England
- Date of death: 10 April 1994 (aged 58)
- Position: Goalkeeper

Senior career*
Years	Team	Apps	(Gls)
19??–1955	Blackwell Colliery Welfare		
1955–1962	Derby County	36	(?)
1962–1967	Torquay United	162	(0)
1967–1968	Baltimore Bays	25	(0)
1968–1969	Dallas Tornado	8	(0)
- * Club domestic league appearances and goals

Terence Adlington (21 November 1935 – 10 April 1994) was an English professional football goalkeeper. He began his career in England, but ended it in the United States with the North American Soccer League.

== Football career ==
Adlington was born in Blackwell, Derbyshire. He was playing for his local side Blackwell Colliery Welfare when spotted by Derby County. He moved to the Baseball Ground in December 1955, shortly after winning the Notts Alliance with Blackwell, though he continued to work part-time as an electrician at the colliery.

His league debut came the following season, a 4–0 win at home to Crewe Alexandra on 26 January 1957, his only game in Derby's 3rd division (north) championship team. He played a total of 36 league games for the Rams, before leaving to join Torquay United in June 1962 for a fee of £1,000 as a replacement for the released Eddie Marsh. He began the following season as first choice, making his debut away to Exeter City on 18 August 1962, keeping a clean sheet as the Gulls won 3–0 thanks to an Ernie Pym hat-trick, and remained a regular for the next three and a half seasons, before breaking a finger and losing his place initially to Mike Turner and then to Gary McGuire.

In a 1963 FA cup game against Barnet he scored a goal, an unusual feat for a goalkeeper. In the days before substitutes he was injured during the game and so played on the wing. Torquay won the game 6–2.

In recognition of his career he was awarded a testimonial in 1965–66 in which a South Devon XI side took on Arsenal. He eventually left for the United States and the newly established North American Soccer League, joining the Baltimore Bays for the 1967 season, moving to the Dallas Tornado in 1968.

He was also the manager of Dover FC for approx 6 years then he moved to Maidstone United.

He died in April 1994. Double Olympic swimming gold medallist Rebecca Adlington is his grandniece.
