= Mike Green (footballer, born 1946) =

English footballer and manager

Personal information
- Full name: Michael Clive Green
- Date of birth: 8 September 1946 (age 80)
- Place of birth: Carlisle, England
- Height: 6 ft 1 in (1.85 m)
- Position: Centre half

Youth career
- –: Carlisle United

Senior career*
Years	Team	Apps	(Gls)
1964–1968	Carlisle United	2	(0)
1968–1971	Gillingham	132	(24)
1971–1974	Bristol Rovers	77	(2)
1974–1977	Plymouth Argyle	108	(8)
1977–1979	Torquay United	88	(7)
–	Newton Abbot		

Managerial career
- 1977–1981: Torquay United
- * Club domestic league appearances and goals

Michael Clive Green (born 8 September 1946) is an English former professional football player and manager. As player, he made more than 400 appearances in the Football League as a centre half for Carlisle United, Gillingham, Bristol Rovers, Plymouth Argyle and Torquay United. As manager, he took charge of Torquay United.

Green was born in Carlisle, Cumberland, and began his career as an apprentice with Carlisle United, turning professional in September 1964. He played only two league games for Carlisle, both the following season, before moving to Gillingham in July 1968. He soon found a regular place at Priestfield Stadium, playing 132 league games, scoring 24 goals.

He moved to Bristol Rovers in July 1971 and was appointed captain of the Eastville side. In July 1974, after 2 goals in 77 games, he moved to Plymouth Argyle for a fee of £19,000. He captained Argyle to promotion from Division Three at the end of his first season at Home Park, going onto play 108 league games, scoring 8 goals, before leaving for local rivals Torquay United in March 1977 as player-manager for a fee of £5,000.

Working with the experienced Frank O'Farrell as the general manager, he put together an attacking side at Plainmoor, but could never get them challenging for promotion, not helped by the lack of funds at his disposal. He retired from playing, after 88 league games and 7 goals, to concentrate on his managerial duties. During the 1979–80 season he surprisingly turned down an offer to manage Second Division Bristol Rovers to remain at Plainmoor, but was sacked in May 1981 after a disappointing season, with O'Farrell taking over as team manager for a third time.

He subsequently played for local non-league side Newton Abbot and later managed a sub-post office in Torquay.
