= Jack Conley (English footballer) =

English footballer (1920–1991)

Personal information
- Full name: John Joseph Conley
- Date of birth: 27 September 1920
- Place of birth: Whitstable, Kent, England
- Date of death: January 1991
- Place of death: Swindon, England
- Position: Centre-forward

Youth career
- –1939: Charlton Athletic

Senior career*
| Years | Team | Apps | (Gls) |
| 1939–1951 | Torquay United | 156 | (72) |
- * Club domestic league appearances and goals

John Joseph Conley (27 September 1920 – January 1991) was an English professional footballer, who played as a centre-forward.

Conley was born in Whitstable, Kent and joined Charlton Athletic as a junior, but on failing to make the grade joined Torquay United in May 1939. The onset of war resulted in Conley's debut being delayed, it finally coming on 31 August 1946 in a 1–1 draw away to local rivals Exeter City. He was dropped after his debut, replaced by Dudley Kernick, but scored twice on his return to the side, after missing just one game, in a 2–2 draw at home to Mansfield Town.

He soon became a regular in the Torquay side and scored his first hat-trick in a 3–0 win at home to Bristol Rovers on 18 January 1947. He finished the season as Torquay's leading goalscoring, scoring 23 times in just 34 league games.

The following season was a struggle for Torquay, the side finishing in 18th place (out of 22) in Third Division South, but Conley continued to flourish, scoring 11 times in 31 league games and one goal in five FA Cup games as Torquay reached the Third Round before losing to Stockport County. He also scored the second hat-trick of his career, scoring three times as Torquay won 4–1 at home to Southend United on 18 October 1947. That season, all but eleven of Torquay's 73 league goals were scored by just four players, Ron Shaw (17), Charlie Hill (12) and Dennis Lewis (10) the others.

The 1948–49 season was a much better one for Torquay. They finished 9th in the league and Conley top-scored with 19 goals in 39 games. His haul included three hat-tricks, all at Plainmoor, against Walsall, Reading and Newport County.

Conley was Torquay's leading goalscorer for a third time in the 1949–50 season, hitting 14 goals in 37 league games as Torquay finished in 5th place. The following season saw Conley begin the season with a new strike partner, Sammy Collins, who would go to be Torquay's highest goalscorer of all time. Conley played just 15 times, scoring five goals, scoring in his final game, a 4–1 win at home to Bristol City on 18 November 1950, before a serious leg injury led to his retirement from the professional game.

He later played for his hometown side Whistable.

He joined Swindon Town as Chief Scout and was assistant manager of the Swindon side, working under Danny Williams, when they reached the 1969 League Cup final.

In 1984, he and Williams were awarded a testimonial by Swindon, a Swindon guest team including John Hollins, Alan Hudson, future Swindon manager Lou Macari and Chris Kamara facing Southampton on 11 September 1984.
