= 2002 in professional wrestling =

2002 in professional wrestling describes the year's events in the world of professional wrestling.

== List of notable promotions ==
These promotions held notable events in 2002.

| Promotion Name | Abbreviation | Notes |
|---|---|---|
| All Japan Pro Wrestling | AJPW | |
| Consejo Mundial de Lucha Libre | CMLL | |
| Frontier Martial-Arts Wrestling | FMW | |
| Lucha Libre AAA Worldwide | AAA | The "AAA" abbreviation has been used since the mid-1990s and had previously stood for the promotion's original name Asistencia Asesoría y Administración. |
| New Japan Pro-Wrestling | NJPW | |
| Ring of Honor | ROH | |
| World Wrestling All-Stars | WWA | |
| World Wrestling Council | WWC | |
| World Wrestling Federation/Entertainment | WWF/E | In March, the WWF divided its roster into two storyline divisions, Raw and SmackDown!, referred to as brands, where wrestlers exclusively performed on their respective weekly television programs. The WWF was then renamed to WWE in May due to a dispute with the World Wildlife Fund over the "WWF" initialism. |

== Calendar of notable shows ==
=== January ===
| Date | Promotion(s) | Event | Location | Main Event |
|---|---|---|---|---|
| January 2–14 | AJPW | Giant Baba Memorial Cup | Philadelphia, Pennsylvania | N/A |
| January 4 | NJPW | Wrestling World | Tokyo, Japan | Jun Akiyama (c) defeated Yuji Nagata in a Singles match for the GHC Heavyweight Championship |
| January 6 | FMW | FMW PPV | Tokyo, Japan | Kintaro Kanemura vs. Kodo Fuyuki in a Singles match |
| January 20 | WWF | Royal Rumble | Atlanta, Georgia | Triple H won by last eliminating Kurt Angle in a 30-man Royal Rumble match for an Undisputed WWF Championship match at WrestleMania X8 |
(c) – denotes defending champion(s)

=== February ===
| Date | Promotion(s) | Event | Location | Main Event |
|---|---|---|---|---|
| February 4 | FMW | FMW PPV | Tokyo, Japan | Kodo Fuyuki and The Sandman vs. Sabu and Tetsuhiro Kuroda in a tag team match |
| February 17 | WWF | No Way Out | Milwaukee, Wisconsin | Chris Jericho (c) defeated Stone Cold Steve Austin in a Singles match for the Undisputed WWF Championship |
| February 24 | WWA | The Revolution | Las Vegas, Nevada | Jeff Jarrett (c) defeated Brian Christopher in a Singles match for the WWA World Heavyweight Championship |
(c) – denotes defending champion(s)

=== March ===
| Date | Promotion(s) | Event | Location | Main Event |
|---|---|---|---|---|
| March 17 | AAA | Rey de Reyes | Zapopan, Jalisco, Mexico | Canek defeated Pirata Morgan, Cibernético and Octagón in a Rey de Reyes 2002 Final elimination match |
| March 17 | WWF | WrestleMania X8 | Toronto, Ontario | Triple H defeated Chris Jericho (c) in a Singles match for the Undisputed WWF Championship |
| March 22 | CMLL | International Gran Prix | Mexico City, Mexico | Blue Panther, Dr. Wagner Jr., and Fuerza Guerrera (c) defeated Los Guerreros del Infierno (Rey Bucanero, Tarzan Boy and Último Guerrero) in a Best two-out-of-three falls six-man tag team match for the CMLL World Trios Championship |
(c) – denotes defending champion(s)

=== April ===
| Date | Promotion(s) | Event | Location | Main Event | Notes |
|---|---|---|---|---|---|
| April 12 | CMLL | 46. Aniversario de Arena México | Mexico City, Mexico | Dr. Wagner Jr., Giganté Silva and Shocker defeated El Puma Inoue, Gigante Singh and Shibata in a Six-man "Lucha Libre rules" tag team match | |
| April 13 | WWA | The Eruption | Melbourne, Australia | Scott Steiner defeated Nathan Jones (c) by submission in a Singles match for the WWA World Heavyweight Championship with Sid Vicious as special outside enforcer | |
| April 21 | WWF: Raw; SmackDown! | Backlash | Kansas City, Missouri | Hollywood Hulk Hogan defeated Triple H (c) in a Singles match for the Undisputed WWF Championship | First WWF PPV under the first brand split, in which the promotion split its roster between the Raw and SmackDown! brands, represented by the shows of the same name. |
(c) – denotes defending champion(s)

=== May ===
| Date | Promotion(s) | Event | Location | Main Event | Notes |
|---|---|---|---|---|---|
| May 4 | WWF: Raw | Insurrextion | London, England | Triple H defeated The Undertaker in a Singles match | First Raw-exclusive PPV under the first brand split. Final event under the WWF name as the company was renamed to World Wrestling Entertainment (WWE) the following day due to a dispute with the World Wildlife Fund over the "WWF" initialism. |
| May 19 | WWE: Raw; SmackDown! | Judgement Day | Nashville, Tennessee | The Undertaker defeated Hollywood Hulk Hogan (c) in a Singles match for the Undisputed WWE Championship | First event under the World Wrestling Entertainment (WWE) name, following the company being renamed from WWF to WWE on May 5. |
(c) – denotes defending champion(s)

=== June ===
| Date | Promotion(s) | Event | Location | Main Event |
|---|---|---|---|---|
| June 8 | N/A | First Annual Big Dick Dudley Memorial Show | Franklin Square, New York | Balls Mahoney (c) defeated Steve Corino in a Singles match for the USA Pro Heavyweight Championship |
| June 23 | WWE: Raw; SmackDown! | King of the Ring | Columbus, Ohio | The Undertaker (c) defeated Triple H in a Singles match for the Undisputed WWE Championship |
(c) – denotes defending champion(s)

=== July ===
| Date | Promotion(s) | Event | Location | Main Event |
|---|---|---|---|---|
| July 5 | AAA | Triplemanía X | Madero, Mexico | Octagón defeated Pentagón (with Màscara Maligna) |
| July 21 | WWE: Raw; SmackDown! | Vengeance | Detroit, Michigan | The Rock defeated Kurt Angle and The Undertaker (c) in a Triple Threat match for the Undisputed WWE Championship |
(c) – denotes defending champion(s)

=== August ===
| Date | Promotion(s) | Event | Location | Main Event | Notes |
|---|---|---|---|---|---|
| August 3–11 | NJPW | G1 Climax | Tokyo | Masahiro Chono defeated Yoshihiro Takayama in a G1 Climax tournament final | |
| August 10 | WWE: SmackDown! | WWE Global Warning Tour: Melbourne | Melbourne | The Rock (c) defeated Triple H and Brock Lesnar in a Triple Threat match for the Undisputed WWE Championship | First SmackDown-exclusive event under the first brand split. |
| August 25 | WWE: Raw; SmackDown! | SummerSlam | Uniondale, New York | Brock Lesnar defeated The Rock (c) in a Singles match for Undisputed WWE Championship | |
(c) – denotes defending champion(s)

=== September ===
| Date | Promotion(s) | Event | Location | Main Event |
|---|---|---|---|---|
| September 13 | CMLL | CMLL 69th Anniversary Show | Mexico City, Mexico | Tarzan Boy defeated Negro Casas in a Best two-out-of-three falls Lucha de Apuestas hair vs. hair match |
| September 14 | WWC | WWC 29th Aniversario | Bayamón, Puerto Rico | The Nasty Boys (Brian Knobbs and Jerry Sags) (XWF Tag Team Champions) defeated Los Reggaetones in a tag team match |
| September 16 | AAA | Verano de Escándalo | Naucalpan, Mexico | El Dandy lost to Electroshock, El Zorro, and Perro Aguayo Jr. in an Elimination match Lucha de Apuestas hair vs. hair match |
| September 22 | WWE: Raw; SmackDown! | Unforgiven | Los Angeles, California | Brock Lesnar (c) vs. The Undertaker in a Singles match for the WWE Championship ended in a double-disqualification |
(c) – denotes defending champion(s)

=== October ===
| Date | Promotion(s) | Event | Location | Main Event |
|---|---|---|---|---|
| October 5 | ROH | Glory By Honor | Philadelphia, Pennsylvania | Christopher Daniels vs. Doug Williams in a singles match |
| October 20 | WWE: Raw; SmackDown! | No Mercy | North Little Rock, Arkansas | Brock Lesnar (c) defeated The Undertaker in a Hell in a Cell match for the WWE Championship |
| October 26 | WWE: SmackDown! | Rebellion | Manchester, England | Brock Lesnar (c) and Paul Heyman defeated Edge in a Handicap match for the WWE Championship |
(c) – denotes defending champion(s)

=== November ===
| Date | Promotion(s) | Event | Location | Main Event |
|---|---|---|---|---|
| November 4 November 5 | WWE: Raw; SmackDown! | Super Tuesday | Boston, Massachusetts; Manchester, New Hampshire | Triple H, Chris Jericho, Christian, and 3-Minute Warning (Rosey and Jamal) defeated Rob Van Dam, Kane, Booker T, Bubba Ray Dudley and Jeff Hardy in a ten-man tag team match |
| November 15 | AAA | Guerra de Titanes (2002) | Veracruz, Mexico | El Alebrije, Máscara Sagráda, La Parka and Octagón defeated Abismo Negro, Cibernético, the Monsther and Leatherface in an Eight-man "Atómicos" tag team match |
| November 17 | WWE: Raw; SmackDown! | Survivor Series | New York, New York | Shawn Michaels defeated Triple H (c), Chris Jericho, Kane, Booker T, and Rob Van Dam in an Elimination Chamber match for the World Heavyweight Championship |
(c) – denotes defending champion(s)

=== December ===
| Date | Promotion(s) | Event | Location | Main Event |
|---|---|---|---|---|
| December 6 | WWA | The Retribution | Glasgow, Scotland | Lex Luger defeated Sting in a Singles match for the vacant WWA World Heavyweight Championship |
| December 13 | CMLL | Sin Piedad | Mexico City, Mexico | Vampiro Canadiense defeated Rey Bucanero in a Best two-out-of-three falls Lucha de Apuesta hair vs. hair match |
| December 15 | WWE: Raw; SmackDown! | Armageddon | Sunrise, Florida | Triple H defeated Shawn Michaels (c) 2–1 in a Three Stages of Hell match for the World Heavyweight Championship |
| December 28 | ROH | Final Battle | Philadelphia, Pennsylvania | Bryan Danielson vs. Low Ki vs. Samoa Joe vs. Steve Corino in a four-way match for the Number One Contender's Trophy |
(c) – denotes defending champion(s)

== Accomplishments and tournaments ==
=== AAA ===
| Accomplishment | Winner | Date won | Notes |
|---|---|---|---|
| Rey de Reyes | Canek | March 17 | |

=== AJW ===
| Accomplishment | Winner | Date won | Notes |
|---|---|---|---|
| Japan Grand Prix 2002 | Nanae Takahashi | July 9 | |
| Tag League The Best 2002 | Kayo Noumi and Momoe Nakanishi | December 23 | |

=== AJPW ===
| Accomplishment | Winner | Date won | Notes |
|---|---|---|---|
| Giant Baba Cup | Mitsuya Nagai | January 14 | |

=== Ring of Honor ===
| Accomplishment | Winner | Date won | Notes |
|---|---|---|---|
| ROH Championship Tournament | Low Ki | July 27 | |
| ROH Tag Team Championship Tournament | The Prophecy (Christopher Daniels and Donovan Morgan) | September 21 | |

=== WWF/E ===
| Accomplishment | Winner | Date won | Notes |
|---|---|---|---|
| Royal Rumble | Triple H | January 20 | Last eliminated Kurt Angle to win an Undisputed WWF Championship match at WrestleMania X8, which he subsequently won from Chris Jericho. |
| Undisputed WWF Championship #1 Contender's Tournament | Stone Cold Steve Austin | February 17 | Defeated Kurt Angle in the tournament final to win a match for the Undisputed WWF Championship at No Way Out, but was unsuccessful in winning the title. |
| King of the Ring | Brock Lesnar | June 23 | Defeated Rob Van Dam in the tournament final to win and be crowned King of the Ring as well as earn a WWE Undisputed Championship match at SummerSlam, which he subsequently won from The Rock. |
| WWE Tag Team Championship Tournament | Kurt Angle and Chris Benoit | October 20 | Defeated Edge and Rey Mysterio in the tournament final to become the inaugural WWE Tag Team Champions. |

== Awards and honors ==
=== Pro Wrestling Illustrated ===
| Category | Winner |
|---|---|
| PWI Wrestler of the Year | Brock Lesnar |
| PWI Tag Team of the Year | Billy and Chuck |
| PWI Match of the Year | The Rock vs. Hollywood Hulk Hogan (WrestleMania X8) |
| PWI Feud of the Year | Eric Bischoff vs. Stephanie McMahon |
| PWI Most Popular Wrestler of the Year | Rob Van Dam |
| PWI Most Hated Wrestler of the Year | Chris Jericho |
| PWI Comeback of the Year | Hollywood Hulk Hogan |
| PWI Most Improved Wrestler of the Year | Brock Lesnar |
| PWI Most Inspirational Wrestler of the Year | Eddie Guerrero |
| PWI Rookie of the Year | Maven |
| PWI Woman of the Year | Trish Stratus |
| PWI Lifetime Achievement | Jim Ross |

=== Wrestling Observer Newsletter ===
==== Wrestling Observer Newsletter Hall of Fame ====
Inductee
Martin Burns
Jack Curley
Kenta Kobashi
Wahoo McDaniel
Manami Toyota

==== Wrestling Observer Newsletter awards ====
| Category | Winner |
|---|---|
| Wrestler of the Year | Kurt Angle |
| Most Outstanding | Kurt Angle |
| Tag Team of the Year | Los Guerreros (Eddie Guerrero and Chavo Guerrero) |
| Most Improved | Brock Lesnar |
| Best on Interviews | Kurt Angle |

== Title changes ==
=== NJPW ===
IWGP Heavyweight Championship
Incoming champion – Kazuyuki Fujita
| Date | Winner | Event/Show | Note(s) |
| January 4 | Vacated | Wrestling World | |
| February 16 | Tadao Yasuda | Fighting Spirit | |
| April 5 | Yuji Nagata | Toukon Special | |

IWGP Tag Team Championship
Incoming champions – BATT (Keiji Mutoh and Taiyo Kea)
| Date | Winner | Event/Show | Note(s) |
| February 2 | Vacated | N/A | |
| March 24 | Hiroshi Tanahashi and Yutaka Yoshie | Hyper Battle | |

IWGP Junior Heavyweight Championship
Incoming champion – Kendo Kashin
| Date | Winner | Event/Show | Note(s) |
| February 1 | Vacated | N/A | |
| February 16 | Minoru Tanaka | Fighting Spirit | |
| July 19 | Koji Kanemoto | Summer Fight Series | |

IWGP Junior Heavyweight Tag Team Championship
Incoming champions – Gedo and Jado
| Date | Winner | Event/Show | Note(s) |
| May 2 | Jushin Thunder Liger and Minoru Tanaka | Toukon Memorial Day | |
| August 29 | Tsuyoshi Kikuchi and Yoshinobu Kanemaru | Cross Road | |

=== WWF/E ===
– Raw
– SmackDown

Following the introduction of the brand extension in March, titles became exclusive to a brand. Only the promotion's original world championship and women's championship were non-exclusive until later in the year.

Undisputed WWF Championship
Incoming champion – Chris Jericho
| Date | Winner | Event/Show | Note(s) |
| March 17 | Triple H | WrestleMania X8 | |
| April 21 | Hollywood Hulk Hogan | Backlash | |
The title was renamed to Undisputed WWE Championship on May 5 when the WWF became World Wrestling Entertainment (WWE). It was then renamed to WWE Undisputed Championship.
| May 19 | The Undertaker | Judgment Day | |
| July 21 | The Rock | Vengeance | Triple threat match, also involving Kurt Angle. |
| August 25 | Brock Lesnar | SummerSlam | |
The title became exclusive to the SmackDown! brand after Brock Lesnar signed an exclusive deal to only appear for SmackDown!. The World Heavyweight Championship was then created for the Raw brand. The title was renamed to WWE Championship as it was no longer "undisputed".
| November 17 | Big Show | Survivor Series | |
| December 15 | Kurt Angle | Armageddon | |

World Heavyweight Championship
(Title created)
| Date | Winner | Event/Show | Note(s) |
| September 2 | Triple H | Monday Night Raw | Awarded the title by Raw General Manager Eric Bischoff as Triple H was originally the number one contender for the WWE Undisputed Championship, which became exclusive to SmackDown! and dropped the "Undisputed" moniker. |
| November 17 | Shawn Michaels | Survivor Series | First-ever Elimination Chamber match, also involving Chris Jericho, Booker T, Rob Van Dam, and Kane. |
| December 15 | Triple H | Armageddon | Three Stages of Hell match. |

WWF Intercontinental Championship
Incoming champion – Edge
| Date | Winner | Event/Show | Note(s) |
| January 20 | William Regal | Royal Rumble | |
| March 17 | Rob Van Dam | WrestleMania X8 | |
The title became exclusive to the Raw brand following the 2002 WWF draft lottery when Rob Van Dam was drafted to Raw.
| April 21 | Eddie Guerrero | Backlash | |
The title was renamed to WWE Intercontinental Championship on May 5 when the WWF became World Wrestling Entertainment (WWE).
| May 27 | Rob Van Dam | Monday Night Raw | Ladder match |
| July 29 | Chris Benoit | Monday Night Raw | |
The title became exclusive to the SmackDown! brand due to Chris Benoit transferring to SmackDown!.
| August 25 | Rob Van Dam | SummerSlam | |
The title became exclusive to the Raw brand due to Rob Van Dam being a member of the Raw roster.
| September 16 | Chris Jericho | Monday Night Raw | |
| September 30 | Kane | Monday Night Raw | |
| October 20 | Triple H | No Mercy | Title for title unification match, in which Triple H also defended the World Heavyweight Championship. |
| October 20 | Deactivated | No Mercy | Unified with the World Heavyweight Championship. |

WWF Light Heavyweight Championship
Incoming champion – X-Pac
| Date | Winner | Event/Show | Note(s) |
| March 8 | Retired | N/A | The title retired |

WWF Cruiserweight Championship
Incoming champion – Tajiri
| Date | Winner | Event/Show | Note(s) |
The title became exclusive to the SmackDown! brand following the 2002 WWF draft lottery when Tajiri was drafted to SmackDown!.
| April 2 (aired April 4) | Billy Kidman | SmackDown! | |
| April 21 | Tajiri | Backlash | |
The title was renamed to WWE Cruiserweight Championship on May 5 when the WWF became World Wrestling Entertainment (WWE).
| May 14 (aired May 16) | The Hurricane | SmackDown! | Triple threat match, also involving Billy Kidman. |
| June 23 | Jamie Noble | King of the Ring | |
| November 17 | Billy Kidman | Survivor Series | |

WWF Women's Championship
Incoming champion – Trish Stratus
| Date | Winner | Event/Show | Note(s) |
| February 4 | Jazz | Monday Night Raw | |
The title was renamed to WWE Women's Championship on May 5 when the WWF became World Wrestling Entertainment (WWE).
| May 13 | Trish Stratus | Monday Night Raw | Hardcore mixed tag team match where both Jazz's title and Steven Richards' WWE Hardcore Championship were on the line. Stratus teamed with Bubba Ray Dudley and defeated Jazz and Richards. |
| June 23 | Molly Holly | King of the Ring | |
| September 22 | Trish Stratus | Unforgiven | |
The title became exclusive to the Raw brand.
| November 17 | Victoria | Survivor Series | Hardcore match |

WWF European Championship
Incoming champion – Christian
| Date | Winner | Event/Show | Note(s) |
| January 29 (aired January 31) | Diamond Dallas Page | SmackDown! | |
| March 19 (aired March 21) | William Regal | SmackDown! | |
The title became exclusive to the Raw brand following the 2002 WWF draft lottery when William Regal was drafted to Raw.
| April 8 | Spike Dudley | Monday Night Raw | |
The title was renamed to WWE European Championship on May 5 when the WWF became World Wrestling Entertainment (WWE).
| May 6 | William Regal | Monday Night Raw | |
| July 8 | Jeff Hardy | Monday Night Raw | |
| July 22 | Rob Van Dam | Monday Night Raw | Title for title unification match, in which Van Dam also defended the WWE Intercontinental Championship. |
| July 22 | Retired | Monday Night Raw | Unified with the WWE Intercontinental Championship. |

WWF World Tag Team Championship
Incoming champions – The Dudley Boyz (Bubba Ray and D-Von Dudley)
| Date | Winner | Event/Show | Note(s) |
| January 7 | Spike Dudley and Tazz | Monday Night Raw | Hardcore match |
| February 19 (aired February 21) | Billy and Chuck | SmackDown! | |
The titles became exclusive to the SmackDown! brand following the 2002 WWF draft lottery when Billy and Chuck were drafted to SmackDown!. The titles were renamed to WWE Tag Team Championship on May 5 when the WWF became World Wrestling Entertainment (WWE).
| May 19 | Rico and Rikishi | Judgment Day | |
| June 4 (aired June 6) | Billy and Chuck | SmackDown! | Tag team elimination match. |
| July 2 (aired July 4) | Edge and Hollywood Hulk Hogan | SmackDown! | |
| July 21 | The Un-Americans (Christian and Lance Storm) | Vengeance | |
The titles became exclusive to the Raw brand due to The Un-Americans being members of the Raw roster. The titles were renamed to World Tag Team Championship.
| September 23 | Hurri-Kane (The Hurricane and Kane) | Monday Night Raw | |
| October 14 | Christian and Chris Jericho | Monday Night Raw | On October 20, the WWE Tag Team Championship was established for the SmackDown! brand. |
| December 15 | Booker T and Goldust | Armageddon | Four-way tag team elimination match, also involving The Dudley Boyz and William Regal and Lance Storm. |

WWE Tag Team Championship
(Title created)
| Date | Winner | Event/Show | Note(s) |
| October 20 | Kurt Angle and Chris Benoit | No Mercy | Defeated Edge and Rey Mysterio in the tournament final to become the inaugural champions. |
| November 5 (aired November 7) | Edge and Rey Mysterio | SmackDown! | Two out of three falls match. |
| November 17 | Los Guerreros (Eddie and Chavo Guerrero Jr.) | Survivor Series | Three-way tag team elimination match, also involving Kurt Angle and Chris Benoit. |

WWF Hardcore Championship
Incoming champion – The Undertaker
| Date | Winner | Event/Show | Note(s) |
| February 5 (aired February 7) | Maven | SmackDown! | |
| February 26 (aired February 28) | Goldust | SmackDown! | |
| March 11 | Al Snow | Monday Night Raw | |
| March 12 (aired March 14) | Maven | SmackDown! | |
| March 17 | Spike Dudley | WrestleMania X8 | Pinned Maven during a title defense against Goldust. |
| March 17 | The Hurricane | WrestleMania X8 | Pinned Spike Dudley in the backstage area. |
| March 17 | Mighty Molly | WrestleMania X8 | Pinned The Hurricane in the backstage area. |
| March 17 | Christian | WrestleMania X8 | Pinned Molly Holly in the backstage area. |
| March 17 | Maven | WrestleMania X8 | Pinned Christian in the backstage area. |
The title became exclusive to the SmackDown! brand following the 2002 WWF draft lottery when Maven was drafted to SmackDown!.
| March 26 (aired March 28) | Raven | SmackDown! | |
The title became exclusive to the Raw brand due to Raven being a member of the Raw roster.
| April 1 | Bubba Ray Dudley | Monday Night Raw | |
| April 6 | William Regal | House show | |
| April 6 | Goldust | House show | |
| April 6 | Raven | House show | |
| April 6 | Bubba Ray Dudley | House show | |
| April 7 | William Regal | House show | |
| April 7 | Goldust | House show | |
| April 7 | Raven | House show | |
| April 7 | Bubba Ray Dudley | House show | |
| April 12 | William Regal | House show | |
| April 12 | Spike Dudley | House show | |
| April 12 | Goldust | House show | |
| April 12 | Bubba Ray Dudley | House show | |
| April 13 | William Regal | House show | |
| April 13 | Spike Dudley | House show | |
| April 13 | Goldust | House show | |
| April 13 | Bubba Ray Dudley | House show | |
| April 14 | William Regal | House show | |
| April 14 | Spike Dudley | House show | |
| April 14 | Goldust | House show | |
| April 14 | Bubba Ray Dudley | House show | |
| April 15 | Raven | Monday Night Raw | |
| April 15 | Tommy Dreamer | Monday Night Raw | |
| April 15 | Steven Richards | Monday Night Raw | |
| April 15 | Bubba Ray Dudley | Monday Night Raw | |
| April 19 | Goldust | House show | |
| April 19 | Raven | House show | |
| April 19 | Bubba Ray Dudley | House show | |
| April 20 | Goldust | House show | |
| April 20 | Raven | House show | |
| April 20 | Bubba Ray Dudley | House show | |
| April 29 | Steven Richards | Monday Night Raw | Pinned Bubba Ray Dudley during a title defense against Jazz. |
| May 1 | Tommy Dreamer | House show | |
| May 1 | Goldust | House show | |
| May 1 | Steven Richards | House show | |
| May 2 | Shawn Stasiak | House show | |
| May 2 | Justin Credible | House show | |
| May 2 | Crash Holly | House show | |
| May 2 | Steven Richards | House show | |
| May 2 | Shawn Stasiak | House show | |
| May 2 | Steven Richards | House show | |
| May 3 | Crash Holly | House show | |
| May 3 | Steven Richards | House show | |
| May 4 | Booker T | Insurrextion | |
| May 4 | Crash Holly | Insurrextion | |
| May 4 | Booker T | Insurrextion | |
| May 4 | Steven Richards | Insurrextion | |
The title was renamed to WWE Hardcore Championship on May 5 when the WWF became World Wrestling Entertainment (WWE).
| May 6 | Bubba Ray Dudley | Monday Night Raw | |
| May 6 | Raven | Monday Night Raw | |
| May 6 | Justin Credible | Monday Night Raw | |
| May 6 | Crash Holly | Monday Night Raw | |
| May 6 | Trish Stratus | Monday Night Raw | |
| May 6 | Steven Richards | Monday Night Raw | |
| May 25 | Tommy Dreamer | House show | |
| May 25 | Raven | House show | |
| May 25 | Steven Richards | House show | |
| May 26 | Tommy Dreamer | House show | |
| May 26 | Raven | House show | |
| May 26 | Steven Richards | House show | |
| May 27 | Terri | Monday Night Raw | Pinned Steven Richards during an interview. |
| May 27 | Steven Richards | Monday Night Raw | Immediately pinned Terri to regain the championship. |
| June 2 | Tommy Dreamer | House show | |
| June 2 | Raven | House show | |
| June 2 | Steven Richards | House show | |
| June 3 | Bradshaw | Monday Night Raw | |
| June 22 | Raven | House show | |
| June 22 | Spike Dudley | House show | |
| June 22 | Shawn Stasiak | House show | |
| June 22 | Bradshaw | House show | |
| June 28 | Shawn Stasiak | House show | |
| June 28 | Spike Dudley | House show | |
| June 28 | Steven Richards | House show | |
| June 28 | Bradshaw | House show | |
| June 29 | Shawn Stasiak | House show | |
| June 29 | Spike Dudley | House show | |
| June 29 | Steven Richards | House show | |
| June 29 | Bradshaw | House show | |
| June 30 | Raven | House show | |
| June 30 | Crash Holly | House show | |
| June 30 | Stevie Richards | House show | |
| June 30 | Bradshaw | House show | |
| July 6 | Steven Richards | House show | |
| July 6 | Crash Holly | House show | |
| July 6 | Christopher Nowinski | House show | |
| July 6 | Bradshaw | House show | |
| July 7 | Steven Richards | House show | |
| July 7 | Crash Holly | House show | |
| July 7 | Christopher Nowinski | House show | |
| July 7 | Bradshaw | House show | |
| July 12 | Justin Credible | House show | |
| July 12 | Spike Dudley | House show | |
| July 12 | Big Show | House show | |
| July 12 | Bradshaw | House show | |
| July 13 | Justin Credible | House show | |
| July 13 | Shawn Stasiak | House show | |
| July 13 | Bradshaw | House show | |
| July 14 | Justin Credible | House show | |
| July 14 | Shawn Stasiak | House show | |
| July 14 | Bradshaw | House show | |
| July 15 | Johnny Stamboli | Monday Night Raw | |
| July 15 | Bradshaw | Monday Night Raw | |
| July 22 | Johnny Stamboli | Monday Night Raw | |
| July 22 | Bradshaw | Monday Night Raw | |
| July 26 | Raven | House show | |
| July 26 | Justin Credible | House show | |
| July 26 | Shawn Stasiak | House show | |
| July 26 | Bradshaw | House show | |
| July 27 | Raven | House show | |
| July 27 | Justin Credible | House show | |
| July 27 | Shawn Stasiak | House show | |
| July 27 | Bradshaw | House show | |
| July 28 | Raven | House show | |
| July 28 | Justin Credible | House show | |
| July 28 | Shawn Stasiak | House show | |
| July 28 | Bradshaw | House show | |
| July 29 | Jeff Hardy | Monday Night Raw | |
| July 29 | Johnny Stamboli | Monday Night Raw | |
| July 29 | Tommy Dreamer | Monday Night Raw | |
| August 3 | Bradshaw | House show | |
| August 3 | Tommy Dreamer | House show | |
| August 4 | Bradshaw | House show | |
| August 4 | Tommy Dreamer | House show | |
| August 9 | Shawn Stasiak | House show | |
| August 9 | Steven Richards | House show | |
| August 9 | Tommy Dreamer | House show | |
| August 10 | Shawn Stasiak | House show | |
| August 10 | Steven Richards | House show | |
| August 10 | Tommy Dreamer | House show | |
| August 11 | Shawn Stasiak | House show | |
| August 11 | Steven Richards | House show | |
| August 11 | Tommy Dreamer | House show | |
| August 17 | Raven | House show | |
| August 17 | Shawn Stasiak | House show | |
| August 17 | Tommy Dreamer | House show | |
| August 18 | Shawn Stasiak | House show | |
| August 18 | Steven Richards | House show | |
| August 18 | Tommy Dreamer | House show | |
| August 19 | Bradshaw | Monday Night Raw | Hardcore battle royal. |
| August 19 | Crash Holly | Monday Night Raw | Hardcore battle royal. |
| August 19 | Tommy Dreamer | Monday Night Raw | Hardcore battle royal. The 24/7 rule was deactivated on August 19. |
| August 26 | Rob Van Dam | Monday Night Raw | Title for title unification match, in which Van Dam also defended the WWE Intercontinental Championship. |
| August 26 | Retired | Monday Night Raw | Unified with the WWE Intercontinental Championship. |

== Debuts ==
- Bobby Fish
- Candice LeRae
- Chase Stevens
- Chris Masters
- Chuck Taylor
- Dave Mastiff
- Eddie Edwards
- Ethan Carter III
- Ivelisse Vélez
- Johnny Jeter
- Mike Kanellis
- Mike Mondo
- Petey Williams
- Travis Tomko

- January 23 – Shachihoko Boy
- March 1 - Sami Zayn
- March 2 –
  - Alex Shelley
  - Kazuhiko Ogasawara
  - Silas Young
- February 2 - Billy Ken Kid
- February 9 - El Ligero
- March 16 – Zach Gowen
- April 20 – DJ Nira
- May (Unknown what specific date) - Sheamus
- May 10 - Karl Anderson
- May 11 – Taiji Ishimori
- May 18 – Toru Yano
- June 2 – Mikey Batts
- June 5 – James Ellsworth
- June 18 - Malakai Black
- June 19 - Johnny TV
- July 27 – Special K
- August 10 – Montel Vontavious Porter
- August 29 – Shinsuke Nakamura
- October 2 – Matt Morgan
- October 12 –
  - Eddie Kingston
  - Yoshi Tatsu
- October 20 - Awesome Kong
- October 21 – Yoshihiro Sakai
- November 9 – Sylvan Grenier
- November 10 - Asosan
- November 11 – Becky Lynch
- December 27 – Fred Sampson

== Retirements ==
- Black Bart (wrestler) (1975-2002)
- Bushwhacker Luke (1962-2002) (first retirement, returned to wrestling in 2007)
- Rip Morgan (1983-2002)
- Stevie Ray (1989-2002) (first retirement, return to wrestling in 2015 and retired in 2017)
- Butch Reed (1978-2002) (first retirement, returned to wrestling in 2005 and retired in 2013)

== Births ==
- March 5 - Kenzie Paige
- April 20 – Mochizuki Jr.
- April 23 – Mei Seira
- April 25 – Miyu Amasaki
- July 8 – Kid Lykos II
- July 14 – Kosei Fujita
- July 24 – Tomoka Inaba
- August 26 - Uriah Connors
- September 16 – Suzu Suzuki
- October 1 – AZM
- December 10 – Ilusion

== Deaths ==
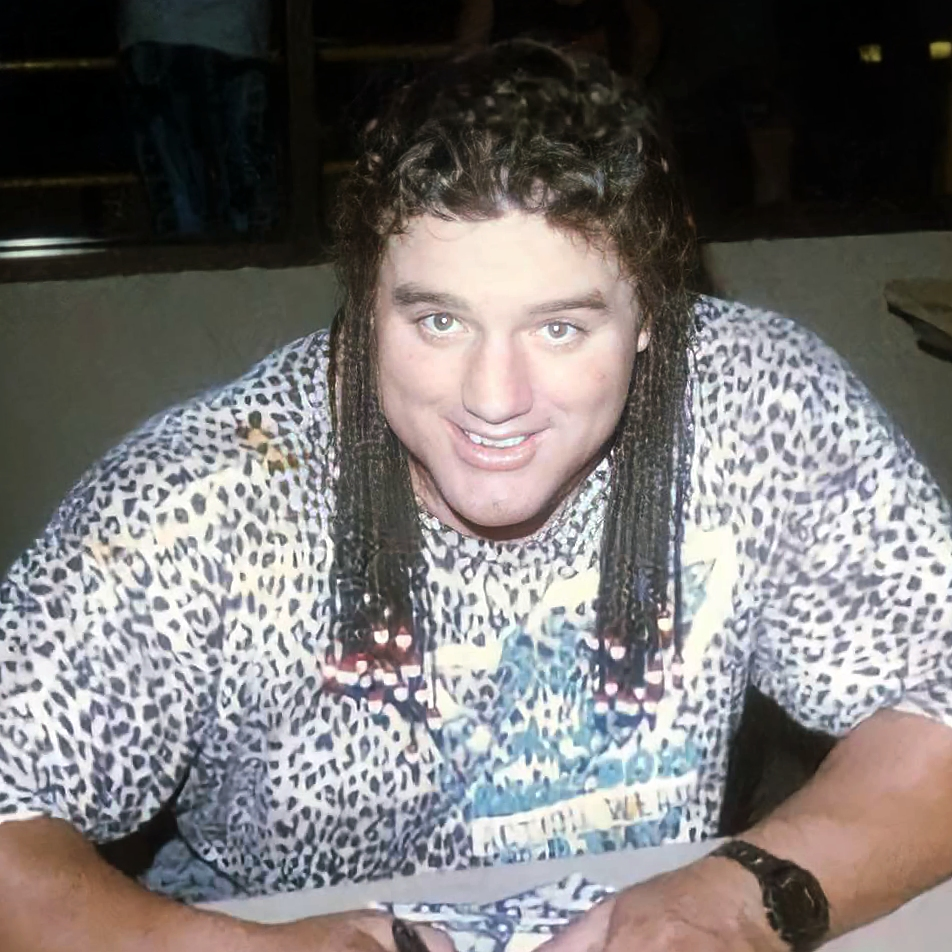
Davey Boy Smith

- January 7 – Mighty Igor, 70
- January 9 - Les Kellett, 86
- February 3 – Nelson Royal, 66
- February 9 - Rattlesnake Raitz, 38
- February 19 – Swede Hansen, 68
- March 1 – Dino Casanova, 35
- March 7 – Troy Graham, 52
- March 17 - Big Red, 51
- April 3 – Bobby Managoff, 84
- April 11 – Stanley Weston, 82
- April 18 – Wahoo McDaniel, 63
- April 28 – Lou Thesz, 86
- May 5 – Randy Anderson, 42
- May 14 – George Gordienko, 74
- May 16
  - Shoichi Arai, 36
  - Big Dick Dudley, 34
- May 18 - Davey Boy Smith, 39
- August 1 – Don Owen, 90
- August 22- Abe Zvonkin, 92
- September 9 - Mike Paidousis, 78
- September 21 – Rocco Rock, 49
- October 31 - Moose Cholak, 72
- November 19 - Kangaroo Kennedy, 76
- November 20 - Billy Goelz, 84
- November 22 - Thunder Sugiyama, 62
- November 23 – Billy Travis, 41
- November 29 - George "Two Ton" Harris, 74/75
- November 30 - Mr. Wrestling, 68

== See also ==
- List of FMW supercards and pay-per-view events
- List of WWA pay-per-view events
- List of WWF/E pay-per-view events
