= Gary McGuire =

English footballer

Personal information
- Full name: James Gary McGuire
- Date of birth: 30 September 1938 (age 88)
- Place of birth: Campsall, England
- Position: Goalkeeper

Youth career
- West Ham United

Senior career*
Years	Team	Apps	(Gls)
- Walthamstow Avenue
- Sydney Hakoah
1966–1968	Torquay United	32	(0)
- Bedford Town
- Hastings United
- * Club domestic league appearances and goals

James Gary McGuire (born 30 September 1938) is an English former association football goalkeeper who played in the Football League for Torquay United. He was born in Campsall, in the parish of Norton, Doncaster, Yorkshire.

McGuire started playing football as a 16-year-old with West Ham United, before going on to play for Walthamstow Avenue, with whom he won the 1961 FA Amateur Cup. Described in the July 1961 edition of Charles Buchan's Football Monthly as "the most improved goalkeeper in the Isthmian League", McGuire played for the Isthmian League representative side that visited Kampala as part of the Ugandan Independence celebrations. He then spent three years in Australia, returning to England in February 1966 to join Torquay United from Hakoah. He took his chance to replace Terry Adlington when he was out of the side with a broken finger, and helped the club to promotion from the Fourth Division. He played 32 first-team games for Torquay before leaving league football, playing in turn for non-league sides Bedford Town and Hastings United.

McGuire worked in the City of London as an equities trader until he retired in 2003.
