= Ted Calland =

English footballer

Personal information
- Full name: Edward Calland
- Date of birth: 15 June 1932
- Place of birth: Lanchester, County Durham, England
- Date of death: 25 May 1995 (aged 62)
- Place of death: Torquay, England
- Position: Centre-forward

Youth career
- Durham City

Senior career*
Years	Team	Apps	(Gls)
1952	Fulham	0	(0)
1952–1957	Torquay United	47	(21)
1957–1960	Exeter City	106	(49)
1960–1961	Port Vale	12	(3)
1961–1962	Lincoln City	7	(3)
- Cheltenham Town
Total		172+	(76+)
- * Club domestic league appearances and goals

Edward Calland (15 June 1932 – 25 May 1995) was an English professional footballer who played as a centre-forward. He scored 76 goals in 171 league games in a ten-year career in the Football League with Fulham, Torquay United, Exeter City, Port Vale, and Lincoln City. His brothers Ralph and Albert also played professional football.

== Career ==
Calland joined Bill Dodgin's Fulham in April 1952 from Northern League club Durham City. He was unable to break into the Fulham first-team and left Craven Cottage in September 1952, joining Torquay United on a free transfer, linking up with his older brothers Ralph and Albert. His league debut came in the 1952–53 season, and although not a first-team regular he managed to score 21 goals in 47 Third Division South games for Eric Webber's "Gulls". The Plainmoor side finished in mid-table in 1952–53, 1953–54, 1954–55 and 1955–56, before finishing in second place in 1956–57 – behind champions Ipswich Town on goal average.

In July 1957, he moved to league rivals Exeter City for a fee of £1,500. He scored 15 league goals as the "Grecians" finished bottom of the league in 1957–58 before they replaced manager Bill Thompson with Frank Broome. Exeter finished just one point outside the (newly created) Fourth Division promotion places in 1958–59, with Calland top-scoring with 27 goals in 47 league games. City then dropped down to ninth place in 1959–60 as he could only add a further seven goals to his tally. He was transfer-listed in January 1960. Calland scored 49 goals in 105 league games at St James Park.

He left Exeter in August 1960 on a free transfer, joining Norman Low's Port Vale. Nicknamed "Cheyenne" by supporters, he scored three goals in 12 Third Division games in the 1960–61 season as he lost his first-team spot after just a month. He left Vale Park on a free transfer to Lincoln City in July 1961. He scored three times in seven Third Division games for Bill Anderson's "Imps" in 1961–62, and left Sincil Bank and later played for Southern League side Cheltenham Town.

== Style of play ==
Calland was a centre-forward with a powerful shot.

== Later life ==
After retirement Calland returned to Torquay and ran the Torbay Cab Company. He died in May 1995 after a long illness.

== Career statistics ==
Appearances and goals by club, season and competition
Club	Season	League			FA Cup		League Cup		Total	
Club	Season	Division	Apps	Goals	Apps	Goals	Apps	Goals	Apps	Goals
Fulham	1951–52	First Division	0	0	0	0	—		0	0
Torquay United	1952–53	Third Division South	7	1	0	0	—		7	1
Torquay United	1953–54	Third Division South	4	1	0	0	—		4	1
Torquay United	1954–55	Third Division South	7	4	0	0	—		7	4
Torquay United	1955–56	Third Division South	29	15	2	2	—		31	17
Torquay United	Total		47	21	2	2	0	0	49	23
Exeter City	1957–58	Third Division South	34	15	1	1	—		35	16
Exeter City	1958–59	Fourth Division	44	27	1	1	—		45	28
Exeter City	1959–60	Fourth Division	28	7	1	0	—		29	7
Exeter City	Total		106	49	3	2	0	0	109	51
Port Vale	1960–61	Third Division	12	3	1	0	0	0	13	3
Lincoln City	1961–62	Third Division	7	3	0	0	2	0	9	3
Career total			172	76	6	4	2	0	180	80
