= Albert Calland (footballer) =

English footballer

Personal information
- Full name: Albert Calland
- Date of birth: 10 September 1929
- Place of birth: Bishop Auckland, England
- Date of death: 23 April 2014 (aged 84)
- Place of death: Torbay, England
- Position: Centre forward

Senior career*
Years	Team	Apps	(Gls)
- Langley Park
1950–1954	Torquay United	24	(11)
- Spennymoor United
- Bideford
- * Club domestic league appearances and goals

Albert Calland (10 September 1929 – 3 January 2014) was an English professional footballer who played as a centre forward in the Football League for Torquay United. He was born in Bishop Auckland, County Durham.

Calland joined Torquay United in March 1950 from Langley Park, joining his older brother Ralph at Plainmoor. He had to wait a couple of years for his Gulls' debut, and soon after his younger brother Ted also arrived at the club. He scored 11 times in only 24 league games before leaving league football.

Calland reappeared in Devon playing for Bideford in the 1956 season with his second game being against Torquay United Reserves in the Western League Cup having scored four goals on his debut the week before against Chippenham Town in the Western League itself.
