= WWE Super Tuesday =

2002 World Wrestling Entertainment event

Super Tuesday
- Promotion: World Wrestling Entertainment
- Date: November 4 & 5, 2002 (aired November 12, 2002)
- City: Boston, Massachusetts; Manchester, New Hampshire
- Venue: Fleet Center; Verizon Wireless Arena

Super Tuesday was a 1-hour professional wrestling television special event, produced by the World Wrestling Entertainment (WWE) that aired on November 12, 2002 (which was taped November 4 & 5) at the Fleet Center in Boston, Massachusetts and Verizon Wireless Arena in Manchester, New Hampshire, which featured matches from both Raw and SmackDown. It was a preview for Survivor Series and aired on UPN.

From 2004 to 2008 WWE held a pay-per-view named Taboo Tuesday (2004–2005), which later became Cyber Sunday (2006–2008).

== Event ==
The event featured three matches where the main event was a Ten-man tag team match in which the World Heavyweight Champion Triple H, Chris Jericho, Christian, and 3-Minute Warning (Rosey and Jamal) defeated Rob Van Dam, Kane, Booker T, Bubba Ray Dudley and Jeff Hardy, after Triple H pinned Kane.

The other two matches were: Eddie Guerrero defeated Chris Benoit and Edge in a Triple threat match, and Trish Stratus fought to a no-contest Torrie Wilson in a Bikini contest after Nidia interfered.

== Results ==
No.	Results	Stipulations	Times
1	Eddie Guerrero defeated Chris Benoit and Edge	Triple threat match	7:32
2	Trish Stratus vs. Torrie Wilson ended in a no-contest	Bikini Contest with Tazz as master of ceremonies	—
3	Triple H, Chris Jericho, Christian, and 3-Minute Warning (Rosey and Jamal) defeated Rob Van Dam, Kane, Booker T, Bubba Ray Dudley and Jeff Hardy	Ten-man tag team match	8:38

== See also ==
- 2002 in professional wrestling
- Taboo Tuesday/Cyber Sunday
