= Colin Bettany =

English footballer (born 1932)

Personal information
- Full name: Colin David Bettany
- Date of birth: 15 June 1932 (age 94)
- Place of birth: Leicester, England
- Position: Full back

Youth career
- –: Leicester City

Senior career*
Years	Team	Apps	(Gls)
1953–1955	Crewe Alexandra	29	(6)
1955–1957	Birmingham City	0	(0)
1957–1966	Torquay United	335	(4)
1966–19xx	Nuneaton Borough		
- * Club domestic league appearances and goals

Colin David Bettany (born 15 June 1932) is an English former professional footballer who played in the Football League for Crewe Alexandra and Torquay United.

Bettany, a Leicester-born full back, was an amateur with his local side Leicester City when he signed professional forms with Crewe Alexandra in August 1953. Six goals from 29 league games led to a transfer to Birmingham City in June 1955, but in two years at St Andrew's he was never to make a league appearance. In April 1957 he joined Torquay United, making his debut at centre forward on the opening day of the following season in a 3–0 defeat away to Colchester United. After three games Bettany lost his place as Torquay manager Eric Webber shuffled his side to allow Dennis Lewis to return after injury.

After two games on the sidelines, Bettany returned to the side, but at full-back where he was to establish himself. Between 4 April 1958 and 31 August 1963, Bettany was an ever-present figure in the Torquay league side with a run of 195 consecutive appearances, a figure bettered only by Lewis for Torquay. This spell included all 46 games in Torquay's 1959–60 Fourth Division promotion season. He eventually made 335 league appearances, scoring four times, before returning to the Midlands, joining non-league club Nuneaton Borough.
