= Mervyn Gill =

English footballer (1931-2007)

Personal information
- Full name: Mervyn John Gill
- Date of birth: 13 April 1931 (age 95)
- Place of birth: Exeter, England
- Date of death: September 2007 (aged 76)
- Place of death: Bridport, England
- Height: 5 ft 11 in (1.80 m)
- Position: Goalkeeper

Senior career*
Years	Team	Apps	(Gls)
1948–1953	Bideford		
1953–1955	Portsmouth	6	(0)
1955	Woking		
1955–1956	Southampton	1	(0)
1956–1962	Torquay United	157	(0)
1962	Bath City		
- * Club domestic league appearances and goals

Mervyn John Gill (13 April 1931 – September 2007) was an English football goalkeeper who spent most of his playing career with Torquay United.

== Football career ==
=== Early career ===
Gill was born in Exeter, Devon and spent his early years as a footballer (from 1948 to 1953) playing with Bideford in the Western League. During his time with the north Devon club, they gained promotion twice as champions, of Division Three in 1949–50 and of Division Two in 1951–52.

In August 1953, Gill joined Portsmouth of the Football League First Division as an amateur, under-studying Ted Platt. Gill made six league and three F.A. Cup appearances for Portsmouth in the 1953–54 season, but by the end of the season, Northern Ireland international Norman Uprichard had re-established himself as the first choice 'keeper.

In 1954, Gill was enlisted into the Royal Air Force for his national service, during which time he made occasional appearances for Woking. Gill was based at Thorney Island, near Chichester where he represented the RAF at football.

On being demobbed, he joined Southampton as an amateur in December 1955, becoming new manager Ted Bates's first signing, before signing professional papers in April 1956. He made only one first-team appearance, standing in for Fred Kiernan in the final match of the 1955–56 season, a 3–1 victory at Walsall.

=== Torquay United ===
After making eight appearances in the Saints' reserves in August and September 1956, Gill moved back to his native Devon, where he joined Torquay United, of the Third Division South, managed by former Southampton player Eric Webber.

Gill was immediately drafted into the first-team, replacing Peter Wakeham in goal for the remainder of the 1956–57 season, at the end of which Torquay finished as runners-up to Ipswich Town, missing out on the only promotion spot on goal average. In 1957–58, Wakeham was restored as first-choice 'keeper, with Gill as under-study, making only ten appearances as Torquay struggled, eventually finishing in 21st place and finding themselves in the new Fourth Division the following season.

Following the departure of Wakeham in September 1958, Gill was re-instated as first-choice goalkeeper and retained his position throughout the next three seasons, helping Torquay to return to the Third Division in 1960.

In the 1961–62 season, Gill lost his place to Eddie Marsh and at the end of the season he retired from professional football. In his six years at Plainmoor, Gill made a total of 174 appearances in league and cup matches.

== Career after football ==
On retiring from football, Gill was employed by English China Clays from December 1962 until December 1990. He lived in retirement in Bridport, Dorset, where he died in September 2007 at the age of 76.
