= David Byng =

English footballer

Personal information
- Full name: David Graeme Byng
- Date of birth: 9 July 1977 (age 49)
- Place of birth: Coventry, England
- Position: Forward

Youth career
- Torquay United

Senior career*
Years	Team	Apps	(Gls)
1993–1996	Torquay United	10	(3)
1996	Doncaster Rovers	0	(0)
1996	→ Ilkeston Town (loan)		
1996–?	Ilkeston Town		
- * Club domestic league appearances and goals

David Graeme Byng (born 9 July 1977 in Coventry) is an English former professional footballer.

Byng joined Torquay United as an apprentice, and became the Gulls' youngest ever player (and goalscorer) when he made his league debut against Walsall on 14 August 1993. Despite this promising start to his Plainmoor career, Byng failed to establish himself and was released to join Doncaster Rovers in February 1996 after scoring 3 times in 24 league games (half of which were as a substitute) for Torquay.

He failed to break into the Doncaster first team and was sent on loan to Ilkeston Town early in the 1996–97 season. In December 1996, Byng was released by Doncaster, joining Ilkeston on a free transfer.

He is now a Quantity Surveyor in Plymouth.
