= Ian Twitchin =

English footballer

Personal information
- Full name: Ian Robert Twitchin
- Date of birth: 22 January 1952
- Place of birth: Teignmouth, England
- Date of death: 3 December 2017 (aged 65)
- Height: 5 ft 6 in (1.68 m)
- Positions: Right back; midfielder

Senior career*
Years	Team	Apps	(Gls)
1970–1981	Torquay United	400	(15)
1981–1982	Minehead		
- Teignmouth
1983–1987	Newton Abbot		
- Dawlish
- Teignmouth

Managerial career
- 1983–1987: Newton Abbot
- * Club domestic league appearances and goals

Ian Robert Twitchin (22 January 1952 – 3 December 2017) was an English professional footballer. In February 1969, he won two England Amateur Youth caps before embarking on a long professional career with Torquay United, making 400 appearances in the Football League. He later played for Minehead and Teignmouth before spending four years as player-manager at South Western League Newton Abbot. He then had a season at Dawlish before ending his career at his home town team Teignmouth. He died on 3 December 2017.

To celebrate and commemorate his loyalty to the club, the Torquay United Supporters' Trust inaugurated 'the Ian Twitchin Trophy' to be awarded annually to the player making the most appearances for Torquay United each season.
