= Eddie Marsh (footballer) =

Scottish footballer

Personal information
- Full name: Wilson Edmund Marsh
- Date of birth: 14 December 1927
- Place of birth: Dundee, Scotland
- Date of death: 18 April 2010 (aged 82)
- Place of death: Cheshire, England
- Position: Goalkeeper

Senior career*
Years	Team	Apps	(Gls)
1949–1950	Erith & Belvedere	?	(?)
1950–1957	Charlton Athletic	26	(0)
1957–1959	Luton Town	2	(0)
1959–1962	Torquay United	61	(0)
1962–1963	Bideford	?	(?)
Total		89	(0)
- * Club domestic league appearances and goals

Wilson Edmund Marsh (14 December 1927 – 18 April 2010) was a Scottish footballer who played as a goalkeeper in the Football League.

Marsh was born in Scotland, however he grew up in South London. He signed for Charlton Athletic from Erith & Belvedere in 1950 as a back-up for the Addicks first choice goalkeeper at the time Sam Bartram. He found first team opportunities limited at The Valley and moved on to Luton Town in 1956, and later on to Torquay United in 1959. In the 1959–60 season he was part of Torquay's first ever promotion squad making 20 appearances under Eric Webber, as United were promoted to the Third Division. Over the next three seasons he competed with Mervyn Gill for the number one spot at Plainmoor, making 64 league and cup appearances. After a short spell at Bideford he retired from the game to become a representative for a paint company.
