= Deryl Northcott =

New Zealand accounting academic

- Education: University of Waikato
- Scientific career
- Workplaces: University of Manchester, Auckland University of Technology
- Thesis: Uses of accounting information in capital investment decision making (1996)

Deryl Northcott is a New Zealand accounting academic. She is currently a full professor at the Auckland University of Technology.

== Academic career ==
After a 1996 PhD titled 'Uses of accounting information in capital investment decision making' at the University of Waikato, she moved to the University of Manchester in the UK, before returning to New Zealand and Auckland University of Technology in 2002 as full professor.

== Selected works ==
- Llewellyn, Sue, and Deryl Northcott. "The average hospital." Accounting, Organizations and Society 30, no. 6 (2005): 555–583.
- Hopper, Trevor, Deryl Northcott, and Robert William Scapens, eds. Issues in management accounting. Pearson education, 2007.
- Alkaraan, Fadi, and Deryl Northcott. "Strategic capital investment decision-making: A role for emergent analysis tools?: A study of practice in large UK manufacturing companies." The British Accounting Review 38, no. 2 (2006): 149–173.
- Northcott, Deryl. Capital investment decision-making. Cengage Learning EMEA, 1992.
