= Steve Cooper (footballer, born 1955) =

English footballer

Personal information
- Full name: Steven Milne Cooper
- Date of birth: 14 December 1955 (age 70)
- Place of birth: Stourbridge, England
- Height: 5 ft 11 in (1.80 m)
- Position: Forward

Senior career*
Years	Team	Apps	(Gls)
- Stourbridge
1977–1984	Torquay United	234	(76)
- Saltash United
Total		234	(76)
- * Club domestic league appearances and goals

Steven Milne Cooper (born 14 December 1955) is an English former professional footballer who played as a forward.

== Career ==
Born in Stourbridge, Cooper played for Stourbridge, Torquay United and Saltash United.
