= Newton Abbot A.F.C. =

Newton Abbot
- Full name: Newton Abbot FC
- Nickname: The Reds
- Founded: 1964
- Ground: Coach Road; Newton Abbot
- Manager: John Gayle
- 2007–08: South West Peninsula League; Division One East, 3rd (promoted)

Newton Abbot F.C. was a football club based in Newton Abbot, Devon, England. They were established in 1964 as Newton Dynamos, changing their name in 1980. In the 2005–06 season, they reached the Second Round of the FA Vase. For the 2008–09 season, they were members of the South West Peninsula League Premier Division, but were expelled from the league mid-season after failing to fulfil two fixtures. In their last season, they were managed by ex-professional footballer John Gayle.
