= Kevin Hill (footballer) =

English footballer and manager

Personal information
- Date of birth: 6 March 1976 (age 50)
- Place of birth: Exeter, England
- Position: Midfielder

Senior career*
| Years | Team | Apps | (Gls) |
| –1997 | Torrington | | |
| 1997–2008 | Torquay United | 417 | (52) |
| 2008–2010 | Dorchester Town | 64 | (2) |
| 2010–2013 | Tiverton Town | 100 | (6) |
| 2022- | Tiverton Town | 1 | (0) |
| Total | | 523 | (57) |

Managerial career
- 2013–: Exmouth Town
- * Club domestic league appearances and goals

Kevin Hill (born 6 March 1976) is an English former professional footballer who is the manager of Exmouth Town.

== Career ==
Hill was born in Exeter and was playing for non-league side Torrington, and working in a local supermarket, when Kevin Hodges signed him for Torquay United in August 1997. He made his league debut on 9 August 1997 in a 2–1 defeat away to Macclesfield Town, Macclesfield's first game as a league side after promotion from the Conference.

He quickly became a regular in the side and remained so under a number of different managers. In the 2000–01 season, he was Torquay's leading goalscorer, including a crucial goal in the last game of the season away to Barnet, which saw Barnet relegated to the Conference and Torquay surviving. The circle was turned when he was a regular in the 2003–04 promotion winning side under Leroy Rosenior. In February 2006 he played his 400th game for Torquay against Bury in a 0–0 draw.

Hill was awarded a testimonial in 2007, culminating in a match with local rivals Plymouth Argyle at Plainmoor and his loyalty to the club led to him being sent a letter by FIFA president Sepp Blatter. He struggled to establish himself under new manager Paul Buckle and in February 2008 was linked with a loan move to Dorchester Town, but chose to stay with Torquay.

On 5 May 2008, Hill made his record equalling 473rd appearance for Torquay United in a play-off semi final defeat (1–4 on the day 3–5 on aggregate) at home to local rivals Exeter City. He marked the occasion by scoring Torquay's goal. He beat the appearance record, previously held by Dennis Lewis, on 10 May 2008 by coming on as a late substitute for Tim Sills in the FA Trophy final between Torquay and Ebbsfleet United, a game which Ebbsfleet won 1–0, thanks to a goal from former Torquay forward Chris McPhee.

On 17 June 2008, Hill signed for Conference South side Dorchester Town, on a two-year deal.

On 8 September 2010, it was confirmed Hill signed for Tiverton Town who beat interest from Weymouth to land the 34-year-old midfielder. On 27 July 2013 Hill signed for Exmouth as player/coach.

On 23 February 2022, Hill made a one-off appearance for Tiverton following a major injury crisis for the club and played in their 4–1 defeat away to Chesham United

== All time playing career ==
| Season | Team | Division | League Apps | League Goals | Cup*Apps | Cup Goals |
|---|---|---|---|---|---|---|
| 1997-98 | Torquay United | 3 | 37 | 7 | 9 | 0 |
| 1998-99 | Torquay United | 3 | 35 | 5 | 6 | 0 |
| 1999-2000 | Torquay United | 3 | 43 | 2 | 8 | 2 |
| 2000-01 | Torquay United | 3 | 44 | 9 | 4 | 1 |
| 2001-02 | Torquay United | 3 | 44 | 3 | 4 | 1 |
| 2002-03 | Torquay United | 3 | 39 | 4 | 3 | 0 |
| 2003-04 | Torquay United | 3 | 45 | 5 | 2 | 0 |
| 2004-05 | Torquay United | 2 | 39 | 5 | 2 | 0 |
| 2005-06 | Torquay United | 3 | 42 | 9 | 7 | 0 |
| 2006-07 | Torquay United | 3 | 36 | 1 | 6 | 0 |
| 2007-08 | Torquay United | Conference National | 13 | 2 | 6 | 1 |

- Includes Play-Off Matches
