= George Northcott =

English footballer

Personal information
- Full name: George Edward Northcott
- Date of birth: 7 May 1935
- Place of birth: Torquay, England
- Date of death: 15 November 2010 (aged 75)
- Place of death: Torquay, England
- Position: Central defender

Youth career
- 19??–1952: Torquay United

Senior career*
Years	Team	Apps	(Gls)
1952–1962	Torquay United	163	(2)
1962–1963	Cheltenham Town		(1)
1963	Exeter City	1	(0)
1965–1967	Gloucester City	76	(1)
- * Club domestic league appearances and goals

George Edward Northcott (7 May 1935 – 15 November 2010) was an English professional footballer.

Northcott joined Torquay United, where his elder brother Tommy was already an established first team player, as a junior. He turned professional in October 1952, but had to wait until the 1954–55 season for his league debut. He played over 160 times for Torquay before leaving at the end of the 1961–62 season.

He joined non-league Cheltenham Town from where he joined Exeter City in August 1963. However, he played just once for City, before returning to non-league football.
