= Tony Bedeau =

Footballer (1979–2025)

Personal information
- Full name: Anthony Charles Osmond Bedeau
- Date of birth: 24 March 1979
- Place of birth: Hammersmith, London, England
- Date of death: February 2025 (aged 45)
- Place of death: London, England
- Height: 5 ft 10 in (1.78 m)
- Position: Forward

Youth career
- Chelsea
- 1995: Torquay United

Senior career*
Years	Team	Apps	(Gls)
1995–2006	Torquay United	307	(58)
2002	→ Barnsley (loan)	3	(0)
2006–2007	Walsall	18	(1)
2007	→ Bury (loan)	3	(0)
2007–2008	Torquay United	23	(0)
2008	→ Weymouth (loan)	9	(1)
2008–2009	Kingstonian	4	(1)
Total		367	(61)

International career
2004	Grenada	4	(0)
- * Club domestic league appearances and goals

Anthony Charles Osmond Bedeau (24 March 1979 – February 2025) was a professional footballer who played as a forward. Born in England, he made four appearances for the Grenada national team.

== Career ==
=== Torquay United ===
After being on Chelsea's books as a schoolboy, he joined Torquay United as an apprentice in 1995. He made his senior debut as a substitute, at the age of 16, on 9 September 1995 against Cardiff City at Ninian Park. Turning professional on 28 July 1997, he soon established himself as a first-team regular with his pace and ability attracting attention from Premier League sides, which included him training with Sheffield Wednesday for a spell on the recommendation of Chris Waddle, followed by Torquay turning down a bid of £50,000 from Wednesday.

He started the 2000–01 season with an injury, only managing five goals in a disappointing season all round for Torquay. Despite this, he was still in demand from other clubs. In September 2000, Torquay turned down a £200,000 offer from a first division side, thought to be Oxford United, just after he had returned from a week on trial at Sunderland. In December 2000, Rochdale offered £150,000 to Torquay for Bedeau, though he decided against the move.

In May 2001, he agreed to an extension of his contract until 2003. After a poor start to the following season he was transfer-listed, along with fellow forward David Graham, by new manager Roy McFarland and in January 2002 he joined first division Barnsley on loan playing three times as a substitute for the Oakwell side. He returned to Torquay, regaining his place in the first team and played a major role in Torquay securing automatic promotion in 2004, playing in a variety of positions. He was awarded a testimonial by the club in the 2005–06 season, finishing the season as the leading goalscorer, before moving to League Two rivals Walsall on 24 May 2006.

=== Moving clubs ===
Bedeau struggled to establish himself at Walsall, scoring once against Shrewsbury, and was allowed to join Bury on loan in February 2007. He was transfer listed at the end of the 2006–07 season, and rejoined Torquay United in June 2007 on a 12-month contract. He struggled to reestablish himself at Torquay and was loaned to Weymouth in March 2008. He played nine times for Weymouth, scoring once, against Farsley Celtic, and was released by Torquay at the end of the season.

=== Kingstonian ===
On 9 August 2008, Kingstonian announced that they had signed Bedeau on a free transfer. He played in the first four games of the season, scoring once, before his time with Kingstonian was put on hold as he had a number of issues to deal with in Torquay. Bedeau played again for Kingstonian on 5 March 2009.

His last registered club was Kingstonian. After he left them in 2009, he was available as a free agent.

== Death ==
Bedeau died in February 2025, at the age of 45.

== Honours ==
Torquay United

- Football League Third Division third-place promotion: 2003–04

Walsall

- Football League Two: 2006–07
