= Mike Paidousis =

American professional wrestler (1924–2002)

Personal information
- Born: Michael George Paidousis; January 15, 1924 Steubenville, Ohio, United States
- Died: September 9, 2002 (aged 78) Akron, Ohio, United States

Professional wrestling career
- Ring name(s): Mike Paidousis; Great Azul; Mystery Man; Tennessee Rebel; Golden Terror; Masked Terror
- Billed height: 5 ft 10 in (178 cm)
- Billed weight: 242 lb (110 kg)
- Debut: 1950
- Retired: 1981

Michael George Paidousis (January 15, 1924 – September 9, 2002) was an American professional wrestler known as Mike Paidousis. He worked in various territories, notably in Florida, Texas and World Wide Wrestling Federation.

== Professional wrestling career ==
Paidousis made his wrestling debut in 1950. In 1960, Paidousis won his only title, the NWA Central States Heavyweight Championship after defeating Thor Hagen. In 1967, he teamed with Brute Bernard and won the NWA American Tag Team Championship twice. Later, he managed Bernard.

He wrestled for the WWWF from 1975 to 1979.

== Personal life and Death ==
Paidousis trained Big Bully Busick.

On September 9, 2002. Paidousis died from heart failure.

== Championships and accomplishments ==
- Central States Wrestling
  - NWA Central States Heavyweight Championship (1 time)
- Jim Crockett Promotions
  - NWA Mid-Atlantic Southern Tag Team Championship (1 time) — with Great Bolo
- NWA Big Time Wrestling
  - NWA American Tag Team Championship (3 times) - with Brute Bernard (2)
- NWA Mid-America
  - NWA Tennessee Tag Team Championship (1 time) – with Rocky Smith
- Western States Sports
  - NWA International Tag Team Championship (1 time) - with Fritz Von Goering
