= Tommy Northcott =

English footballer

Personal information
- Full name: Thomas Theodore Northcott
- Date of birth: 5 December 1931
- Place of birth: Torquay, England
- Date of death: 26 September 2008 (aged 76)
- Place of death: Torquay, England
- Position: Striker

Senior career*
Years	Team	Apps	(Gls)
1949–1952	Torquay United	60	(10)
1952–1955	Cardiff City	71	(13)
1955–1958	Lincoln City	94	(34)
1958–1966	Torquay United	350	(124)
- Bridgwater Town
- Barnstaple Town
Total		575	(181)
- * Club domestic league appearances and goals

Thomas Theodore Northcott (5 December 1931 – 26 September 2008) was an English professional footballer. Although he played for several clubs during his career, Northcott is particularly remembered for his time at Torquay United, where he is regarded as one of the club's all-time greats and Lincoln City where he was voted as one of their 100 league legends in 2006. He played twice for England at Youth level, against Scotland and Wales.

== Career ==
Northcott was born and raised in the Barton area of Torquay and began his career with local club Hele Spurs before joining his hometown Football league club Torquay United on his 17th birthday. He made his debut in April 1949 against Northampton Town. Within two years he had established himself in the Torquay side and for a short time had a successful forward line partnership with Sammy Collins.

He also completed his apprenticeship as a plumber and did his National Service before signing for Cardiff City in October 1952, as part of an agreement between the club and Torquay that Cardiff received first option on their players in exchange for regular loan deals. He was put straight into the side and over the following three seasons he established himself in the First Division, scoring some vital goals for the club.

He left Cardiff in July 1955 to sign for Lincoln City for a fee of £3000, making his debut on 20 August 1955 against Blackburn Rovers. He scored twenty times that season, taking over as the Imps' main striker when Andy Graver was sold to Stoke City, and spent three years with Lincoln before deciding to return to the South-West of England. Despite interest from both Exeter City and Plymouth Argyle, Torquay manager Eric Webber secured Northcott's services in November 1957 for a fee of £5,000.

He again teamed up with Sammy Collins, but also played alongside his younger brother George, a central defender. He scored 13 times during the remainder of the 1957–58 season, twenty the following season and 15 in the 1959–60 season as Torquay won promotion to the Third Division. In 1963 Torquay signed Robin Stubbs from Birmingham City and Northcott quickly established a fruitful relationship with him. The pair scored over 100 goals over the next three seasons and in 1966 helped Torquay to promotion back to the Third Division. However, he was released by manager Frank O'Farrell at the end of that promotion season.

He joined non-league Bridgwater Town and playing alongside former Torquay teammate Ernie Pym helped Bridgwater to the Western League title in 1968. He later played for Barnstaple Town, before ending his career in local football.

On retirement from Football, Northcott ran a plumbing and central heating business in Torquay, but spent his last few years suffering from Alzheimer's disease.

He died in Torquay in September 2008 from Alzheimers, leaving his widow, Margaret, three daughters, one of whom married Torquay defender Peter Darke, five granddaughters and a great-grandson. His funeral at Torquay Crematorium was marked by a long period of applause and attendees included a number of his former teammates, his former manager Frank O'Farrell and Torquay's current board of directors.
