= Jimmy Dunne (footballer, born 1947) =

Irish footballer

Personal information
- Full name: James Christopher Dunne
- Date of birth: 1 December 1947 (age 78)
- Place of birth: Dublin, Ireland
- Positions: Centre back; midfielder

Senior career*
Years	Team	Apps	(Gls)
1964–1966	Shelbourne	9	(0)
1966–1967	Millwall	0	(0)
1967–1970	Torquay United	126	(13)
1970–1974	Fulham	143	(2)
1974–1975	Durban City	?	(?)
1975–1976	Fulham	0	(0)
1976–1979	Torquay United	122	(6)
1979	Green Gully	17	(1)
1979–1980	Limerick United	1	(0)
1980–1983	Brisbane City	38	(0)

International career
1971	Republic of Ireland	1	(0)

Managerial career
- 1984-1985: Morwell Falcons
- * Club domestic league appearances and goals

James Christopher Dunne (born 1 December 1947, in Dublin) is an Irish former professional footballer. He played as a central defender or midfielder.

He went from Shelbourne to Millwall in 1966 but didn't play first team for Millwall, before moving to Torquay United in 1967. After scoring 13 goals in 126 appearances for United, he then moved to Fulham in 1970. At Fulham he was a regular for four seasons and won his only international cap for the Republic of Ireland in 1971 against Austria.

He finished his career by returning to play with Torquay United from 1975 until 1979.

The highlight of his management career was taking the Morwell Falcons to being Victorian State League champions in 1984.

Jimmy currently resides in Perth, Western Australia.

== Sources ==
- The Boys In Green - The FAI International Story (1997): Sean Ryan (ISBN 978-1851589395)
