= Ernie Pym =

English footballer (1935–2004)

Personal information
- Full name: Ernest Frederick Pym
- Date of birth: 23 March 1935
- Place of birth: Torquay, England
- Date of death: 22 October 2004 (aged 69)
- Place of death: Torbay, England
- Position: Left winger

Senior career*
Years	Team	Apps	(Gls)
–1957	St. Marychurch		
1957–1965	Torquay United	284	(83)
1965–19??	Poole Town		
- Bridgwater Town
Total		284+	(83+)
- * Club domestic league appearances and goals

Ernest Frederick Pym (23 March 1935 – 22 October 2004) was an English professional footballer who played all of his professional career as a left-winger for his local side Torquay United. He joined Torquay in September 1957 from local side St. Marychurch and as one of Eric Webber's most inspired signings went on to score 83 times in 284 league appearances, before leaving for non-league Poole Town in 1965. He is Torquay United's 6th all-time top goal scorer with 187 goals from 305 games playing left-midfield.

He joined non-league Bridgwater Town and playing alongside former Torquay teammate Tommy Northcott helped Bridgwater win the Western League title in 1968.

After retiring from football, alongside his wife Margaret he ran a successful guest house in his home town of Torquay.

He had 2 children and 6 grandchildren.
