= Dennis Lewis (footballer) =

Welsh footballer

Personal information
- Date of birth: 21 April 1925
- Place of birth: Treherbert, Wales
- Date of death: November 1996 (aged 71)
- Place of death: Torquay, England
- Position: Wing half

Youth career
- 1946–1947: Swansea Town

Senior career*
Years	Team	Apps	(Gls)
1947–1959	Torquay United	442	(31)
- * Club domestic league appearances and goals

Dennis Lewis (21 April 1925 – November 1996) was a Welsh footballer who played for Torquay United for twelve years, racking up 442 appearances in the Football League (474 over all competitions). Until May 2008 he was the club's record appearance holder, with Kevin Hill then surpassing his tally.

== Playing career ==
Lewis signed professional forms with Swansea Town in August 1946, but failed to make it onto the pitch for the club and so moved on to Torquay United twelve months later. He scored on his league debut, a 2–0 home win over Aldershot. He soon became an indispensable member of the first eleven, and was an ever-present for two consecutive seasons, one of which was the 1954-55 season which saw the Gulls record an historic triumph over Leeds United in the FA Cup. Between 19 November 1952 and 19 April 1957 he made a club record 207 consecutive league appearances. In June 1959 he became a member of the back-room staff at Plainmoor. After leaving the game completely he worked as a billiard table fitter.
