= Ron Shaw =

English footballer (1924–1991)

Personal information
- Date of birth: 1 January 1924
- Place of birth: Bolton-on-Dearne, England
- Date of death: November 1991 (aged 67)
- Place of death: Middlesbrough, England
- Position: Winger

Youth career
- 19xx–1946: Harrow Borough

Senior career*
| Years | Team | Apps | (Gls) |
| 1946–1958 | Torquay United | 384 | (99) |
- * Club domestic league appearances and goals

Ronald Shaw (1 January 1924 – November 1991) was an English professional footballer who spent his entire professional career with Torquay United, making 384 appearances in the Football League.
