= Ralph Calland =

English footballer (1916–2005)

Ralph Calland (5 July 1916 – August 2005) was an English professional footballer, who played as a full-back for Torquay United. He was born in Lanchester, County Durham.
