= Sammy Collins =

English footballer

Personal information
- Full name: Ronald Dudley Collins
- Date of birth: 13 January 1923
- Place of birth: Bristol, England
- Date of death: 31 May 1998 (aged 75)
- Place of death: Bristol, England
- Position: Striker

Senior career*
Years	Team	Apps	(Gls)
1944–1948	Bristol City	14	(2)
1948–1958	Torquay United	356	(204)
- Gloucester City
- * Club domestic league appearances and goals

Ronald Dudley "Sammy" Collins (13 January 1923 – 31 May 1998) was an English professional football player. He holds the record for most league goals scored by a Torquay United player.

Collins began his career as a right winger with Bristol City, for whom he signed in November 1944. On the resumption of the Football League after the war, he struggled to make an impact at Ashton Gate and, after 2 goals in 14 league games he left to join Torquay United in June 1948. Over the next 10 years, Collins would score 204 league goals in 356 games for Torquay, a total that still stands today as the highest number of league goals by any Torquay player. He also holds the record for most league goals in a season after he hit 40 in 1955–1956. In August 1956, he scored a penalty after only ten seconds of Torquay's game against Walsall. He was Torquay's leading goalscorer seven seasons in a row and played a significant part in Torquay's emergence as one of the better sides in the Third Division (South). On leaving Torquay, he joined non-league side Gloucester City.

He later ran a newsagents on Forest Road near the Plainmoor Ground in Torquay, before returning to his native Bristol to live in retirement.

Collins died in hospital on 31 May 1998.
