= List of Plymouth Argyle F.C. players =

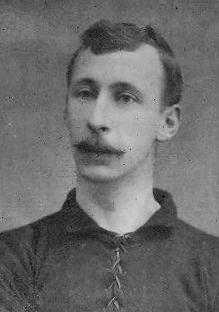
Bob Jack became the club's first professional player in 1903.

Plymouth Argyle Football Club is an English association football club based in Plymouth, Devon. Founded in 1886 as Argyle Football Club, they became a professional club in January 1903, and were elected to the Southern League ahead of the 1903–04 season. The club won the Southern League championship in 1913 and finished as runners-up on two occasions, before being elected to the Football League in 1920, where they compete to this day, as a founder member of the Third Division. Argyle won their first Football League championship, and promotion to the Second Division for the first time, ten years later in 1930. As of May 2011, the club has won five championships in the Football League, gained promotion on eight occasions, and been relegated nine times. Four of those league championships were won in the third tier, which is a divisional record. Argyle have made one appearance at Wembley Stadium, in which they won the 1996 Third Division play-off final. The club has also achieved moderate success in domestic cup competitions; they reached the semi-finals of the FA Cup in 1984, and the quarter-finals in 2007. Argyle have also reached the semi-finals of the League Cup twice, in 1965 and 1974.

Since introducing professionalism, more than 900 players have made a competitive first team appearance for the club. All players who have featured in 100 or more such matches are listed below. The club's all-time appearance record is held by Kevin Hodges, who made 620 appearances for Argyle between 1978 and 1992. Nine other players have made at least 400 appearances for the club, with the two most recent being born and raised in Plymouth; Mickey Evans and Paul Wotton, with the latter being the club's most successful captain. The all-time goalscoring record is held by Sammy Black, who scored 184 times between 1924 and 1938. He is also second on the all-time appearance list, having played in 491 matches for Argyle. Four other players have scored at least 100 goals for the club, with the most recent being Tommy Tynan. As of 2010, Tony Capaldi is the club's most capped international player, having made 21 appearances for Northern Ireland during his Argyle career. Eight players have gone on to become the club's manager; including caretakers, 11 former players have held responsibility for first-team selection. Rory Fallon is the only player listed who has represented his country at the World Cup while with the club. He scored the goal that secured New Zealand's place in the 2010 tournament, and played in all three of their matches in the group stage.

== Table key ==
*	Elected to the club's Hall of Fame
^{†}	Club captains who have won a major honour
^{‡}	Denotes player currently playing for the club
^{¤}	Player holds a club record; appearances, goals, international caps
♦	Won the Player of the Year award. Multiple symbols denote multiple wins

Argyle career	Years that the player was registered to the club
Starts	Appearances made as a member of the starting lineup
Subs	Appearances made after coming on as a substitute
Goals	Goals scored in official competitive matches
International	Statistics from matches sanctioned by FIFA, the sports governing body

== Players ==
Billy Leech was a member of the squad that won the Western League

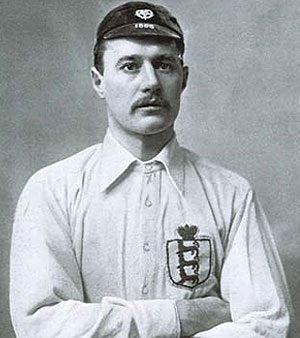
John Willie Sutcliffe was capped for England in football and rugby union

Harry Wilcox captained the club to the Southern League title in 1913

Moses Russell was the club's most capped international player until 2007. He won 20 caps for Wales during his Argyle career, scoring one goal

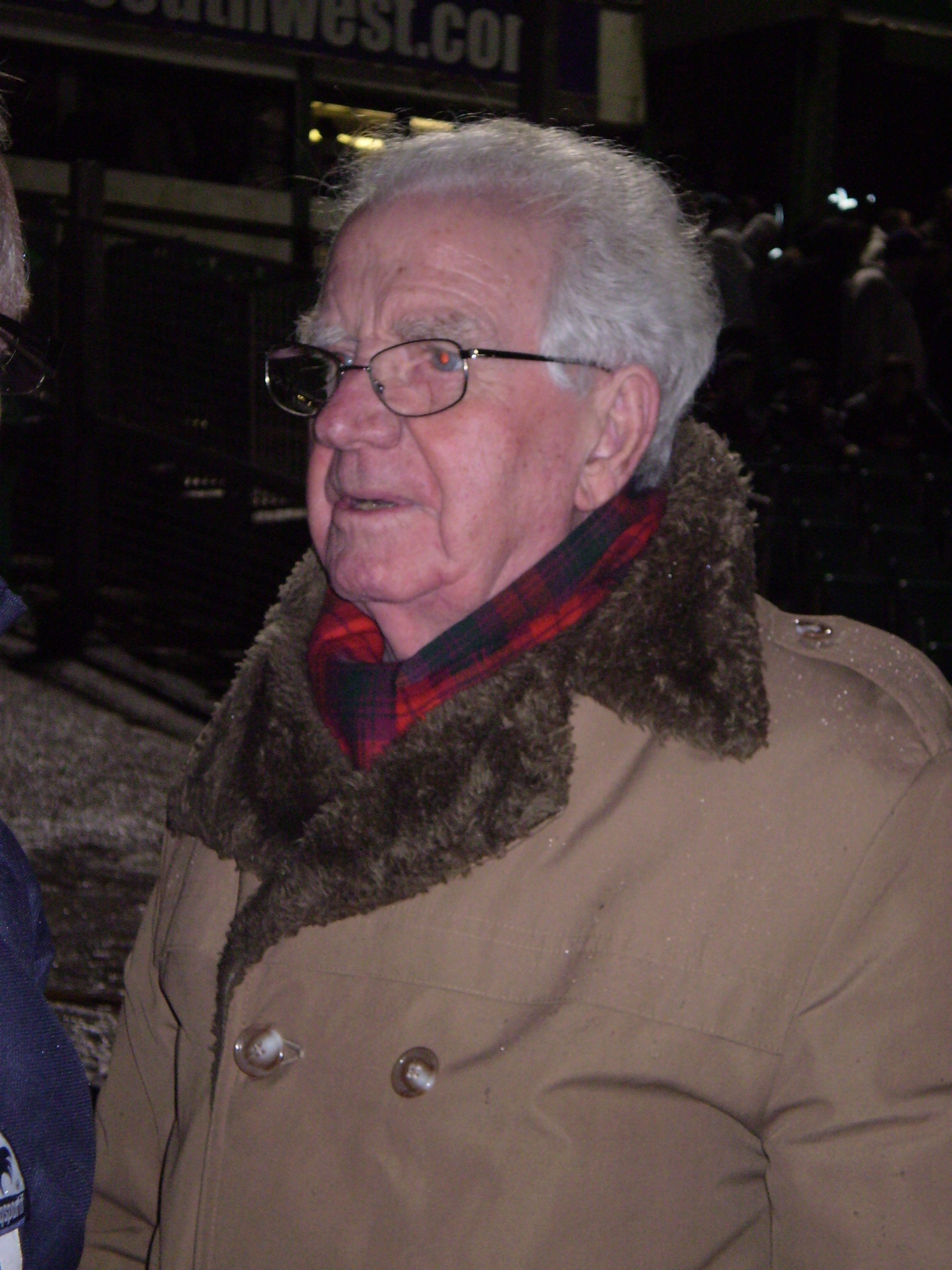
Alex Govan spent two spells with the club and won two league titles

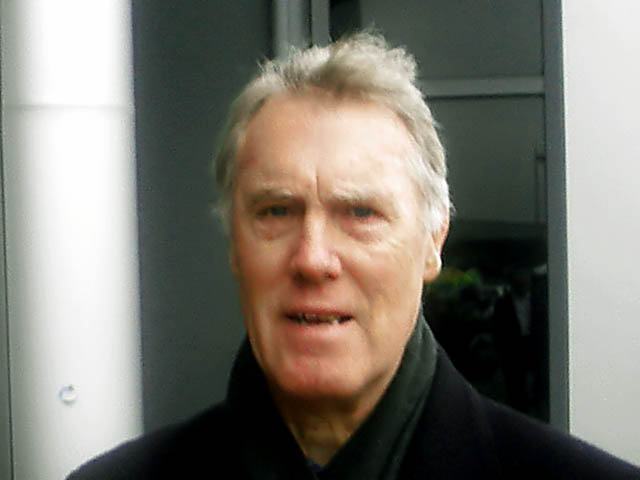
Johnny Newman was the first player to win the Player of the Year award

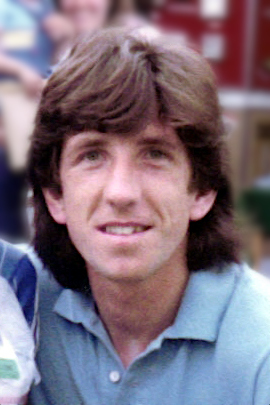
Paul Mariner was the first to win the Player of the Year award twice

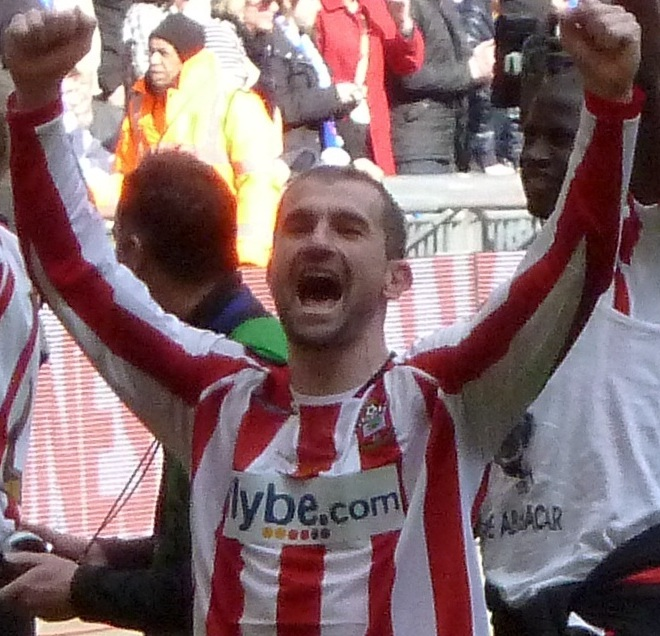
Paul Wotton captained the club to league titles in 2002 and 2004

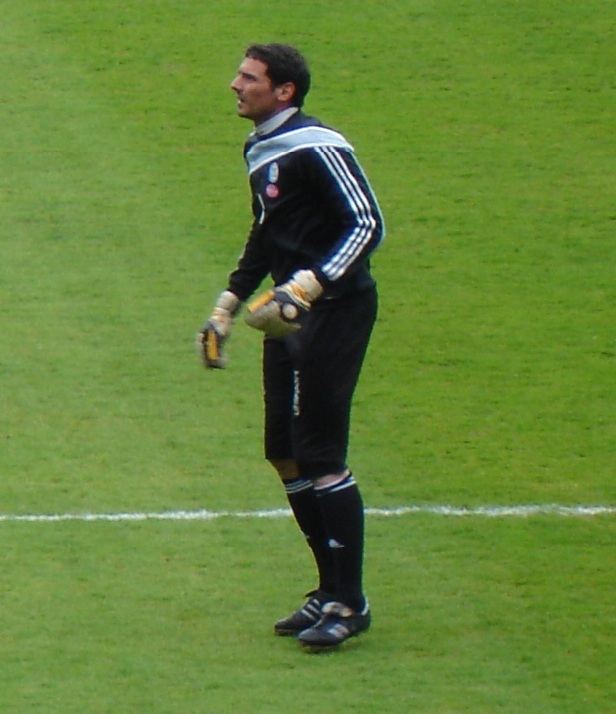
Romain Larrieu was voted Player of the Year in his ninth season

Paul Connolly scored his first Argyle goal in his last season at Home Park

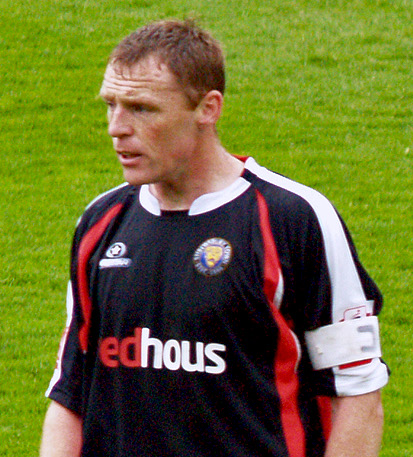
Graham Coughlan was the club's top league goalscorer in 2001–02

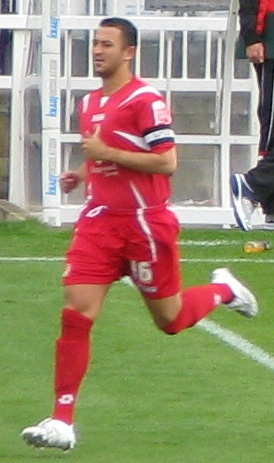
Hasney Aljofree earned one cap for England at under-18 level in 1995

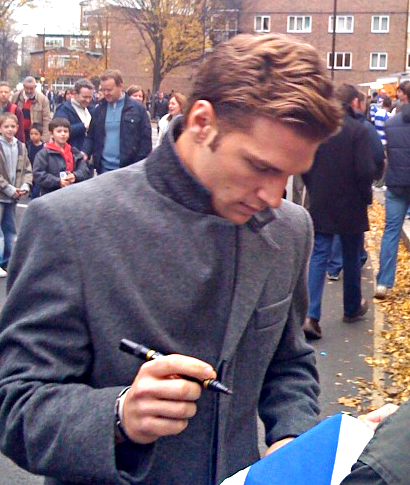
Ákos Buzsáky joined the club in 2005 after a successful loan from Porto

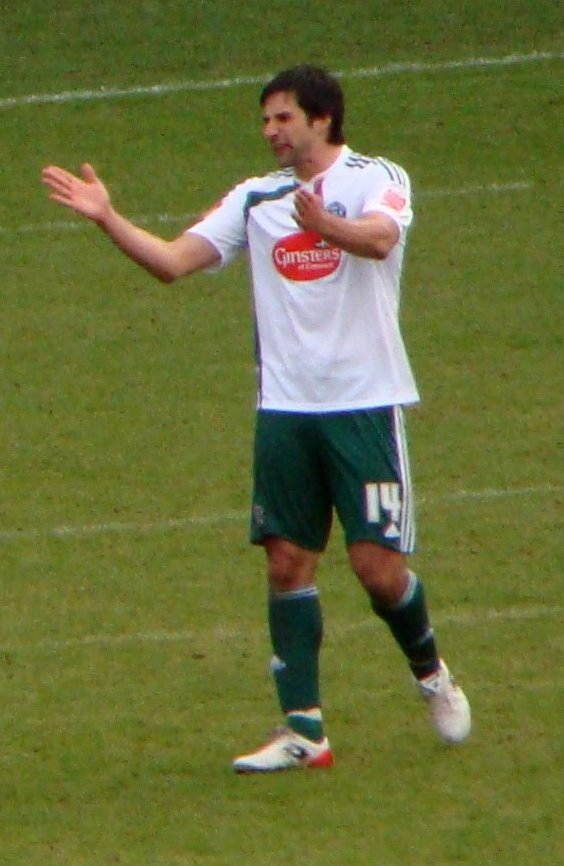
Rory Fallon played for New Zealand at the 2010 World Cup

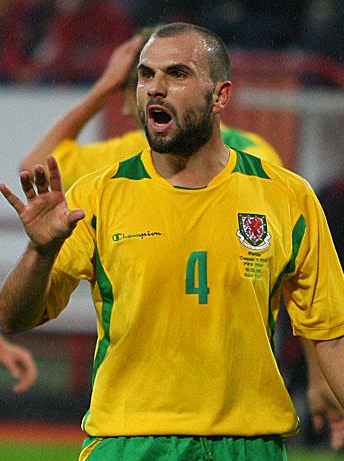
Carl Fletcher (2009–2012)

As of match played on 27 April 2013.

Name^{[A]}	Nationality	Position^{[B]}	Argyle career	Starts	Subs	Total	Goals	Apps	Goals	Notes
Name^{[A]}	Nationality	Position^{[B]}	Argyle career	Appearances^{[C]}			Goals	International^{[D]}		Notes
Bob Jack	Scotland	Forward	1903–1906; 1910–1911	107	0	107	8	0	0	^{[E]}^{[F]}
Andy Clark	Scotland	Defender	1903–1906	145	0	145	1	0	0	—
Charlie Clark	England	Defender	1903–1909^{†}	272	0	272	9	0	0	^{[G]}
Billy Leech	England	Midfielder	1903–1906	151	0	151	7	0	0	—
Fred Buck	England	Forward	1904–1906	101	0	101	42	0	0	^{[H]}
Titch Horne	England	Goalkeeper	1904–1906; 1907–1914	240	0	240	0	0	0	—
Jocky Wright	Scotland	Midfielder	1904–1907	109	0	109	17	0	0	—
John Willie Sutcliffe	England	Goalkeeper	1905–1912	218	0	218	0	5	0	—
Harry Wilcox	England	Forward	1905–1906^{†} 1908–1919^{†}	325	0	325	41	0	0	^{[I]}
Fred Burch	England	Forward	1906–1915	239	0	239	92	0	0	^{[H]}
Septimus Atterbury	England	Defender	1907–1921	342	0	342	6	0	0	—
Jack Butler	England	Defender	1907–1915	288	0	288	2	0	0	—
Arthur Holden	England	Midfielder	1907–1909; 1910–1911	132	0	132	13	0	0	—
Jimmy McCormick	England	Midfielder	1907–1920	305	0	305	25	0	0	—
Harry Raymond	England	Forward	1908–1923	257	0	257	50	0	0	—
William Baker	England	Defender	1909–1915	202	0	202	1	0	0	—
Arthur Dixon	England	Forward	1910–1921	196	0	196	43	0	0	—
Bertie Bowler	England	Forward	1911–1923	186	0	186	68	0	0	^{[H]}
Billy Forbes	Scotland	Defender	1911–1924	250	0	250	1	0	0	—
Jimmy Kirkpatrick	Scotland	Forward	1911–1924	187	0	187	8	0	0	—
Fred Craig	Scotland	Goalkeeper	1912–1930	467	0	467	5	0	0	—
Tommy Gallogley	England	Midfielder	1913–1923	136	0	136	22	0	0	—
Moses Russell	Wales	Defender	1914–1930	400	0	400	6	23	1	—
Jimmy Dickinson	England	Defender	1919–1924	141	0	141	1	0	0	—
Jimmy Logan	Scotland	Midfielder	1919–1928	279	0	279	15	0	0	—
Patsy Corcoran	Scotland	Forward	1920–1925	198	0	198	27	0	0	—
Cecil Eastwood	England	Defender	1920–1924	119	0	119	3	0	0	—
Jack Hill	England	Defender	1920–1923	111	0	111	10	11	1	—
Fred Cosgrove	England	Defender	1921–1931	105	0	105	0	0	0	—
Jack Leslie	England	Forward	1921–1934	401	0	401	136	0	0	^{[H]}
Bob Preston	Scotland	Defender	1923–1928	147	0	147	3	0	0	—
Sammy Black*	Scotland	Forward	1924–1938	491	0	491	184^{¤}	0	0	^{[H]}^{[J]}
John Pullen	Wales	Defender	1924–1934	199	0	199	18	1	0	—
Frank Sloan	Scotland	Forward	1924–1936	213	0	213	50	0	0	—
Fred Forbes	Scotland	Forward	1925–1929	166	0	166	53	0	0	^{[H]}
Fred McKenzie	Scotland	Defender	1926–1934	214	0	214	13	0	0	—
Alec Hardie	Scotland	Defender	1926–1933	241	0	241	4	0	0	—
Alf Matthews	England	Midfielder	1926–1933	147	0	147	32	0	0	—
Fred Titmuss	England	Defender	1926–1932^{†}	177	0	177	0	2	0	^{[K]}
Harry Bland	England	Defender	1927–1934	128	0	128	3	0	0	—
Ray Bowden	England	Forward	1927–1933	153	0	153	85	6	1	—
Harry Cann	England	Goalkeeper	1928–1939	232	0	232	0	0	0	—
Tommy Grozier	Scotland	Forward	1928–1935	223	0	223	59	0	0	^{[H]}
Norman Mackay	Scotland	Midfielder	1928–1934	241	0	241	14	0	0	—
Jack Vidler	England	Forward	1929–1939	256	0	256	103	0	0	^{[H]}
Harry Roberts	England	Defender	1930–1937	257	0	257	21	0	0	—
Archie Gorman	Scotland	Midfielder	1931–1946	251	0	251	2	0	0	—
Jimmy Rae	Scotland	Defender	1932–1940	258	0	258	0	0	0	^{[F]}
Tommy Black	Scotland	Defender	1933–1939	168	0	168	0	0	0	—
Johnny McNeil	Scotland	Defender	1934–1939	144	0	144	13	0	0	—
Sam Kirkwood	Ireland	Defender	1935–1939	111	0	111	1	0	0	—
Bill Shortt	Wales	Goalkeeper	1946–1956	356	0	356	0	12	0	—
Alex Govan	Scotland	Midfielder	1946–1953; 1958–1960	150	0	150	39	0	0	—
Bill Strauss	South Africa	Forward	1946–1953	166	0	166	42	0	0	—
George Dews	England	Forward	1947–1955	271	0	271	81	0	0	—
Pat Jones	England	Defender	1947–1958	441	0	441	2	0	0	—
Paddy Ratcliffe	Republic of Ireland	Defender	1947–1955	246	0	246	10	0	0	—
Maurice Tadman	England	Forward	1947–1955	253	0	253	112	0	0	^{[H]}
Gordon Astall	England	Midfielder	1948–1953	194	0	194	43	2	1	—
Jack Chisholm*	England	Defender	1949–1954^{†}	188	0	188	2	0	0	^{[L]}
Neil Dougall	Scotland	Midfielder	1949–1958	290	0	290	26	1	0	^{[F]}
Johnny Porteous	Scotland	Midfielder	1949–1956	221	0	221	13	0	0	—
George Robertson	Scotland	Defender	1951–1963	382	0	382	2	0	0	—
Peter Anderson	England	Midfielder	1953–1962	259	0	259	46	0	0	—
Rex Tilley	England	Defender	1953–1958	129	0	129	0	0	0	—
Johnny Williams*	England	Midfielder	1955–1966	447	1	448	55	0	0	—
Reg Wyatt	England	Defender	1955–1964	216	0	216	2	0	0	—
Geoff Barnsley	England	Goalkeeper	1957–1961	146	0	146	0	0	0	—
Wilf Carter	England	Forward	1957–1964^{†}	275	0	275	148	0	0	^{[M]}^{[N]}
Harry Penk	England	Midfielder	1957–1960	111	0	111	16	0	0	—
Bryce Fulton	Scotland	Defender	1958–1964	193	0	193	0	0	0	—
Gordon Fincham	England	Defender	1959–1963	149	0	149	4	0	0	—
George Kirby	England	Forward	1960–1962	104	0	104	39	0	0	—
Dave MacLaren	Scotland	Goalkeeper	1960–1964	145	0	145	0	0	0	—
Jim McAnearney	Scotland	Midfielder	1960–1963	147	0	147	37	0	0	—
Johnny Newman	England	Defender	1960–1967	328	0	328	11	0	0	♦^{[O]}
Mike Reeves	England	Defender	1962–1970	121	3	124	0	0	0	—
Doug Baird	Scotland	Defender	1963–1968	157	1	158	2	0	0	—
Duncan Neale	England	Defender	1963–1970	161	5	166	9	0	0	—
Nicky Jennings	England	Midfielder	1964–1967	109	0	109	12	0	0	—
Barrie Jones	Wales	Midfielder	1964–1967	110	0	110	12	15	2	—
Mike Bickle	England	Forward	1965–1971	184	11	195	74	0	0	^{[H]}
Johnny Hore	England	Defender	1965–1975	434	7	441	17	0	0	^{[F]}
Norman Piper	England	Midfielder	1965–1970	233	0	233	37	0	0	♦
Richie Reynolds	England	Midfielder	1965–1971	132	8	140	25	0	0	—
Steve Davey	England	Forward	1966–1974	238	11	249	55	0	0	—
Pat Dunne	Republic of Ireland	Goalkeeper	1967–1970	164	0	164	0	5	0	♦
David Burnside	England	Midfielder	1968–1971	113	0	113	17	0	0	♦
Bobby Saxton	England	Defender	1968–1975	248	9	257	7	0	0	^{[F]}
Colin Sullivan*	England	Defender	1968–1974	252	5	257	7	0	0	—
Derek Rickard	England	Forward	1969–1974	109	12	121	42	0	0	♦
Jim Furnell*	England	Goalkeeper	1970–1976	207	0	207	0	0	0	♦
Peter Darke	England	Defender	1971–1977	101	6	107	2	0	0	—
Neil Hague	England	Defender	1971–1974	113	0	113	17	0	0	♦
Jimmy Hinch	England	Forward	1971–1973	112	5	117	30	0	0	—
David Provan	Scotland	Defender	1971–1974	138	1	139	10	5	0	♦
Brian Johnson	England	Midfielder	1973–1981	218	13	231	43	0	0	—
Paul Mariner*	England	Forward	1973–1976	154	1	155	61	35	13	♦ ♦^{[F]}^{[P]}
Colin Randell	Wales	Midfielder	1973–1977; 1979–1982	286	2	288	19	0	0	—
Alan Rogers	England	Midfielder	1973–1979	130	15	145	5	0	0	—
John Delve	England	Midfielder	1974–1978	146	5	151	6	0	0	—
George Foster	England	Defender	1974–1981	234	14	248	6	0	0	♦ ♦^{[P]}
Mike Green	England	Defender	1974–1977^{†}	122	0	122	10	0	0	^{[Q]}
Billy Rafferty	Scotland	Forward	1974–1976	100	1	101	40	0	0	—
Micky Horswill	England	Midfielder	1975–1978	112	6	118	3	0	0	—
Chris Harrison	England	Defender	1976–1985	371	10	381	8	0	0	—
Brian Bason	England	Midfielder	1977–1981	146	3	149	11	0	0	—
John Uzzell	England	Defender	1977–1989	342	12	354	7	0	0	—
Kevin Hodges*	England	Midfielder	1978–1992	586	34	620^{¤}	87	0	0	♦^{[F]}^{[R]}
Leigh Cooper	England	Midfielder	1979–1990	380	7	387	18	0	0	—
Geoff Crudgington	England	Goalkeeper	1979–1987	385	0	385	0	0	0	—
Forbes Phillipson-Masters	England	Defender	1979–1982	139	0	139	0	0	0	—
John Sims	England	Forward	1979–1983	183	2	185	49	0	0	♦
Gordon Nisbet*	England	Defender	1981–1987	334	0	334	17	0	0	♦^{[F]}
Andy Rogers	England	Midfielder	1981–1985	190	5	195	19	0	0	—
Gordon Staniforth	England	Forward	1983–1985	109	5	114	25	0	0	♦
Tommy Tynan*	England	Forward	1983–1985; 1986–1990	308	2	310	145	0	0	♦ ♦ ♦^{[H]}^{[S]}
Adrian Burrows	England	Defender	1984–1994	316	8	324	14	0	0	—
Russell Coughlin	Wales	Midfielder	1984–1987	149	3	152	22	0	0	—
Clive Goodyear	England	Defender	1984–1987	116	9	125	7	0	0	—
Kevin Summerfield	England	Midfielder	1984–1990	141	22	163	34	0	0	^{[F]}
John Matthews	England	Midfielder	1985–1989	153	6	159	5	0	0	—
Gerry McElhinney	Northern Ireland	Midfielder	1985–1988^{†}	106	1	107	3	6	0	^{[T]}
John Brimacombe	England	Defender	1986–1990	106	7	113	3	0	0	—
Steve Cherry	England	Goalkeeper	1986–1989; 1996–1996	102	0	102	0	0	0	♦
Nicky Marker	England	Midfielder	1987–1992; 1999–2000	236	1	237	18	0	0	♦
Kenny Brown	England	Defender	1988–1991	144	0	144	4	0	0	♦
Sean McCarthy	Wales	Forward	1988–1990; 1998–2001	154	22	176	48	0	0	—
Andy Morrison	Scotland	Defender	1988–1993	123	10	133	7	0	0	—
Martin Barlow	England	Midfielder	1989–2001	341	36	377	26	0	0	♦
Rhys Wilmot	Wales	Goalkeeper	1989–1992	147	0	147	0	0	0	—
Mickey Evans*	Republic of Ireland	Forward	1990–1997; 2001–2006	351	81	432	81	1	0	♦
Steve Morgan	England	Defender	1990–1993	138	1	139	6	0	0	—
Dwight Marshall	Jamaica	Forward	1991–1994; 1998–1999	141	14	155	48	0	0	♦
Steve Castle	England	Midfielder	1992–1995	117	3	120	39	0	0	—
Paul Dalton	England	Midfielder	1992–1995	111	5	116	32	0	0	—
Keith Hill	England	Defender	1992–1996	145	6	151	2	0	0	—
Steve McCall	England	Midfielder	1992–1996; 1998–2000	149	11	160	6	0	0	♦ ♦^{[F]}^{[P]}
Kevin Nugent	England	Forward	1992–1995	150	10	160	37	0	0	—
Lee Hodges	England	Midfielder	1993–1993; 2001–2008	185	37	222	14	0	0	—
Dominic Naylor	England	Defender	1993–1995	98	2	100	1	0	0	—
Mark Patterson	England	Defender	1993–1997	151	3	154	3	0	0	—
Chris Billy	England	Midfielder	1995–1998	125	12	137	9	0	0	♦
Michael Heathcote	England	Defender	1995–2000^{†}	231	4	235	17	0	0	♦ ♦^{[P]}^{[U]}
Chris Leadbitter	England	Midfielder	1995–1997; 1999–2001	107	10	117	5	0	0	—
Adrian Littlejohn	England	Forward	1995–1998	118	12	130	32	0	0	—
Richard Logan	England	Midfielder	1995–1998	81	21	102	13	0	0	—
Ronnie Mauge	Trinidad and Tobago	Midfielder	1995–1999	141	17	158	18	8	1	—
Paul Williams	England	Defender	1995–1998	152	0	152	5	0	0	—
Paul Wotton*	England	Midfielder	1995–2008^{†} 2012–^{‡}	436	39	475	66	0	0	♦ ♦^{[P]}^{[V]}
Jon Beswetherick	England	Defender	1997–2002	154	15	169	0	0	0	—
Jon Sheffield	England	Goalkeeper	1997–2001	175	0	175	0	0	0	—
Steve Adams	England	Midfielder	1998–2005	146	31	177	7	0	0	—
Ian Stonebridge	England	Forward	1999–2004	147	54	201	45	0	0	—
David Friio	France	Midfielder	2000–2005	172	13	185	44	0	0	—
Romain Larrieu	France	Goalkeeper	2000–2012	314	4	318	0	0	0	♦
Martin Phillips	England	Midfielder	2000–2004	105	26	131	12	0	0	—
David Worrell	Republic of Ireland	Defender	2000–2005	165	0	165	0	0	0	—
Paul Connolly	England	Defender	2001–2008	171	6	177	1	0	0	—
Graham Coughlan*	Republic of Ireland	Defender	2001–2005	193	0	193	26	0	0	♦
Marino Keith	Scotland	Forward	2001–2005	76	55	131	32	0	0	—
Luke McCormick	England	Goalkeeper	2001–2008; 2013–^{‡}	156	1	157	0	0	0	—
Hasney Aljofree	England	Defender	2002–2007	119	8	127	5	0	0	—
David Norris	England	Midfielder	2002–2008	232	11	243	28	0	0	♦
Tony Capaldi	Northern Ireland	Midfielder	2003–2007	131	22	153	12	22^{¤}	0	^{[W]}
Mathias Kouo-Doumbé	France	Defender	2004–2009	134	8	142	4	0	0	—
Nick Chadwick	England	Forward	2005–2008; 2011–^{‡}	86	51	137	18	0	0	—
Ákos Buzsáky	Hungary	Midfielder	2005–2007	73	32	105	9	20	2	—
Lilian Nalis	France	Midfielder	2006–2008	103	8	111	6	0	0	♦
Gary Sawyer	England	Defender	2006–2010	98	8	106	5	0	0	—
Marcel Seip	Netherlands	Defender	2006–2011	143	5	148	6	0	0	—
Rory Fallon	New Zealand	Forward	2007–2011	102	58	160	22	14	3	—
Chris Clark	Scotland	Midfielder	2008–2011	90	26	116	4	0	0	—
Karl Duguid	England	Midfielder	2008–2011	106	9	115	3	0	0	—
Jamie Mackie	Scotland	Forward	2008–2010	84	18	102	16	9	2	—
Carl Fletcher	Wales	Midfielder	2009–2012	105	2	107	9	36	1	♦ ♦^{[F]}^{[P]}
Onismor Bhasera	Zimbabwe	Defender	2010–^{‡}	107	7	114	4	19	0	♦

== Footnotes ==
A.: Players are listed according to the date of their first team debut.
B.: For a detailed description of playing positions, see Association football positions.
C.: Appearances and goals are sourced to Danes (2009), up to and including the 2008–09 season, and to Soccerbase as appropriate thereafter. Statistics from the abandoned 1939–40 season and subsequent wartime competitions, including the 1945–46 Football League season, are generally not included by football historians. Substitutions were introduced in 1965.
D.: Caps and goals at international level are sourced to Danes (2009), up to and including the 2008–09 season, and the relevant player reference thereafter. Caps earned during the players whole career are included, not just those won while contracted to Plymouth Argyle.
E.: Jack was the first player to sign a professional contract with the club.
F. ^{a} ^{b} ^{c} ^{d} ^{e} ^{f} ^{g} ^{h} ^{i} ^{j} ^{k} : A player who later managed the club; including caretakers.
G.: Clark led the team to the Western League championship in the 1904–05 season.
H. ^{a} ^{b} ^{c} ^{d} ^{e} ^{f} ^{g} ^{h} ^{i} ^{j} ^{k} : Scored four goals in one match.
I.: Wilcox led the team to the Southern League championship in the 1912–13 season.
J.: Holds club record for goals scored; second overall for appearances made.
K.: Titmuss captained the club to the Third Division South title in the 1929–30 season.
L.: Chisholm led the club to the Third Division South championship in the 1951–52 season.
M.: Carter shared captain duties with Len Casey, who joined the club mid-season, during the 1958–59 Third Division title winning campaign.
N.: Scored five goals in one match.
O.: The first winner of the Player of the Year award.
P. ^{a} ^{b} ^{c} ^{d} ^{e} ^{f} : Won the Player of the Year award twice.
Q.: Green captained the side to promotion from the Third Division in the 1974–75 season.
R.: Holds club record for appearances made; eighth overall for goals scored.
S. Won the Player of the Year award three times.
T.: McElhinney led the club to promotion from the Third Division in the 1985–86 season.
U.: Heathcote captained the club to promotion from the Third Division via the play-offs in the 1995–96 season.
V.: Wotton led to the team to the Third Division championship in the 2001–02 season, and the Second Division championship in the 2003–04 season.
W.: Holds club record for international caps won while at the club.
