= Billy Wright =

Billy Wright may refer to:

- Billy Wright (Australian footballer) (1900–1983), Australian footballer
- Billy Wright (basketball) (born 1974), American college basketball coach
- Billy Wright (boxer) (born 1964), American boxer, nicknamed "Bronco"
- Billy Wright (footballer, born 1900) (1917–?), English footballer with Bolton, Reading and Rouen
- Billy Wright (footballer, born 1924) (1924–1994), Wolverhampton Wanderers and England football captain
- Billy Wright (footballer, born 1931) (1931–2020), Blackpool, Leicester City, Newcastle football player
- Billy Wright (footballer, born 1958), Everton and Birmingham City centre-half
- Billy Wright (footballer, born 1962), New Zealand international footballer
- Billy Wright (football manager) (1903–1983), English football manager
- Billy Wright (loyalist) (1960–1997), Northern Irish loyalist paramilitary leader
- Billy Wright (musician) (1932–1991), blues singer
- Billy Pat Wright (1937–2023), American Republican member of the Missouri House of Representatives

== See also ==
- William Wright (disambiguation)
