= Fred Craig =

Fred Craig may refer to:

- F. W. S. Craig (1929–1989), Scottish psephologist
- Fred Craig, designer of the .22 TCM pistol cartridge
- Fred Craig (footballer) (born 1893), Scottish football goalkeeper
