= William Wright =

William, Will, or Bill Wright may refer to:

== William ==
=== Arts and entertainment ===
- William Aldis Wright (1831–1914), English editor, literary executor of Edward FitzGerald
- William Garrett Wright (born 1979), American poet and editor
- William Wright (poet) (1782–?), Scottish poet
- William Lord Wright (1879–1947), American screenwriter and film producer
- William Wright (actor) (1911–1949), American film actor in the 1940s
- William Wright (author) (1930–2016), American non-fiction writer

=== Military ===
- William Wierman Wright (1824–1882), American civil engineer and Civil War officer for U.S. Military Railroads
- William P. Wright (1846–1933), American Civil War officer
- Sir William Purvis Wright (1846–1910), Royal Marines officer
- William M. Wright (1863–1943), lieutenant general in the United States Army
- William Wright (Indian civil servant) (1895–1990), British World War I flying ace
- William Wright (Medal of Honor) (1835–?), Medal of Honor recipient

=== Politics ===
==== U.S. politics ====
- William Wright (New Jersey politician) (1794–1866), mayor of Newark, New Jersey and U.S. Senator
- William W. Wright (1813–1889), New York politician and Erie Canal Commissioner
- William Bacon Wright (1830–1895), Confederate politician
- William Ambrose Wright (1844–1929), Georgia state comptroller
- William C. Wright (1866–1933), U.S. Representative from Georgia

==== Other politics ====
- William Wright (York merchant), MP for the City of York (1515) and lord mayor of York (1518–1519 and 1535)
- William Wright (Australian politician) (1816–1877), British Army officer and politician in colonial Victoria
- William McKay Wright (1840–1882), Canadian Member of Parliament, Pontiac
- William Wright (Canadian politician) (1853–1926), Canadian Member of Parliament, Muskoka
- William Wright (Scottish politician) (1862–1931), Member of Parliament for Rutherglen, 1922–1931
- Sir William Wright (businessman) (1925–2022), Northern Irish business owner and Unionist politician

=== Religion ===
- William Wright (English priest) (1563–1639), English Catholic missionary priest
- William Burnet Wright (1836–1924), Congregational clergyman from Ohio
- William Wright (missionary) (1837–1899), Irish missionary in Damascus
- William Wright (Canadian bishop) (1904–1990), Canadian Anglican bishop
- William Godsell Wright (1904–1973), Episcopal prelate who served as Bishop of Nevada
- William Wright (Australian bishop) (1952–2021), bishop of Maitland-Newcastle

=== Science ===
- William Wright (botanist) (1735–1819), Scottish physician and botanist
- William Wright (physician) (1827–1908), Canadian physician and curate
- William Wright (surgeon) (1773–1860), English aural surgeon
- William Barton Wright (1828–1915), British railway engineer
- William Hammond Wright (1871–1959), American astronomer
- William Wright (engineer) (c. 1880), American railway engineer

=== Sports ===
- William Wright (cricketer, born 1841) (1841–1916), English cricketer
- William Wright (cricketer, born 1909) (1909–1988), English cricketer
- William Wright (footballer, born 1893) (1893–1945), English footballer for Exeter City and Huddersfield Town
- Will Wright (footballer, born 1997), English football defender
- Will Wright (footballer, born 2008), English football attacker

=== Other ===
- William Wright (journalist), founder of the London-based think tank New Financial
- William Wright (master), English academic
- William Wright (orientalist) (1830–1889), professor of Arabic at the University of Cambridge
- William Wright (privateer) (fl. 1675–1682), English privateer and buccaneer
- William B. Wright (1806–1868), justice of the New York Supreme Court
- William Henry Wright (1876–1951), Canadian prospector, founder of The Globe and Mail
- William James Wright (1903–1994), Scottish farmer and agriculturalist
- William Robert Wright (1935–2012), or Bob Wright (author), American co-author of a biography of Mormon leader David O. McKay

== Will ==
- Will Wright (actor) (1894–1962), American character actor in film and TV
- Will Wright (game designer) (born 1960), co-founder of Maxis, designer of SimCity
- Will Wright (cyclist) (born 1973), Welsh cyclist

== Bill ==
- Bill Wright (catcher) (1864–1940), American professional baseball catcher
- Bill Wright (footballer, born 1914) (1914–?), English footballer
- Bill Wright (outfielder) (1914–1996), American baseball outfielder in the Negro leagues
- Bill Wright (rugby union) (1905–1971), New Zealand rugby player
- Bill Wright (golfer) (1936–2021), American golfer

== See also ==
- Billy Wright (disambiguation)
- Willie Wright (disambiguation)
- Dan DeQuille (1829–1898), pseudonym for William Wright, American journalist
- Rasty Wright (outfielder) (1863–1922), born William Wright, American baseball player
