= Jack Fowler (footballer, born 1899) =

Welsh footballer (1899–1975)

Personal information
- Date of birth: 3 December 1899
- Place of birth: Cardiff, Wales
- Position: Centre forward

Senior career*
| Years | Team | Apps | (Gls) |
| 1919–1921 | Mardy | | |
| 1921–1924 | Plymouth Argyle | 37 | (25) |
| 1924–1930 | Swansea Town | 167 | (102) |
| 1930–1932 | Clapton Orient | 75 | (15) |

International career
| 1925–1928 | Wales | 6 | (3) |
- * Club domestic league appearances and goals

Jack Fowler (3 December 1899 – 26 February 1975) was a Welsh professional footballer, who played as a centre forward for Plymouth Argyle, Swansea Town and Clapton Orient as well as making six appearances for his country.

== Football career ==
=== Plymouth Argyle ===
Fowler was born in Cardiff and started his football career with Mardy, who were then playing in the Southern League Second Division before transferring to the Welsh Section. Whilst with Mardy, Fowler was selected to represent the Southern League (Welsh Section) in a match against the Football League. In 1921 he turned down a move to Brighton & Hove Albion as he was unable to agree terms, but signed for Plymouth Argyle in May.

Initially he found it hard to break into the first team, with Frank Richardson leading the forward line. Fowler made his debut replacing Tommy Gallogley at inside right on 17 December 1921, scoring in a 4–0 victory over Southend United. He retained his place for the next three games before Gallogley returned on New Year's Eve. Plymouth finished the season as runners-up in the Third Division South to Southampton, but with only one team being promoted missed out on promotion on goal average. This was the start of a run of six consecutive seasons in which Plymouth finished as runners-up but were denied promotion.

For the following season, Fowler was used intermittently until mid-March, generally playing as an inside forward, until Richardson left to join Stoke City. Fowler then took over as the recognised centre-forward and, despite making only 22 league appearances, he was the club's top scorer for the season with 17 goals, including a hat-trick in a 5–1 victory over local rivals Exeter City on 30 March 1923.

In the summer of 1923, Plymouth signed Percy Cherrett from Portsmouth and Fowler once again found himself second choice at centre forward, making only ten league appearances (scoring seven goals) in the 1923–24 season. Fowler became unsettled and in February 1924, he returned to Wales to join Swansea Town for a fee of £1280, then a record for the Welsh club. In his three years at Home Park, Fowler scored 25 goals in 39 appearances for Argyle.

Despite having left Argyle in February, Fowler accompanied the Plymouth Argyle side on a tour of South America in the summer of 1924, although he did not play in any of the nine matches against various club and scratch sides.

=== Swansea Town ===
At Swansea, Fowler replaced Jack Smith at centre forward and made 14 appearances, scoring six goals at the end of the 1923–24 season.

The following season, Fowler was ever-present and with 28 goals he was the club's top-scorer for the season at the end of which Swansea claimed the Third Division South title, one point ahead of Fowler's former club. Fowler's goal tally made him the top-scorer across the Third Division South. Fowler's goal tally included five in a match against Charlton Athletic on 27 September 1924, which remains the club's record for the most goals in a match.

Described as a "player of strength and brain", Fowler was a shrewd and determined leader of the Swansea forward line and continued his goal-scoring exploits in the Second Division, scoring 28 goals for the second consecutive year. Fowler soon became a favourite at the Vetch Field, with the crowd urging him on with their own version of a popular song of the time: "Chick chick chick chicken, score a little goal for me". Between 1924 and 1929, Fowler scored nine hat-tricks for Swansea.

Fowler received his first international call up for the visit of England to Vetch Field on 28 February 1925, with the visitors running out 2–1 winners. The following year, Wales visited London and in the match at Selhurst Park on 1 March 1926, Fowler scored twice to enable his country to claim a 3–1 victory.

By 1930, Fowler had lost his place in the Swansea Town side to Ronnie Williams and after only making one appearance in the 1929–30 season, he was transferred to Clapton Orient. In his seven seasons with Swansea, Fowler scored 113 goals from 183 appearances.

=== Clapton Orent ===
At Orient, Fowler had dropped to the Third Division South, where he made a total of 80 appearances, but was unable to replicate his goal-scoring exploits with Swansea, managing only 15 goals in two seasons, before injury brought his career to a close.

== Later career ==
On retirement from football, Fowler returned to Swansea where he kept the Rhyddings Hotel in Brynmill for 35 years.

== International appearances ==
In all, Fowler made six appearances for Wales in international matches, as follows:

| Date | Venue | Opponent | Result | Goals | Competition |
|---|---|---|---|---|---|
| 28 February 1925 | Vetch Field, Swansea | England | 1–2 | 0 | British Home Championship |
| 13 February 1926 | Windsor Park, Belfast | Ireland | 0–3 | 0 | British Home Championship |
| 1 March 1926 | Selhurst Park, London | England | 3–1 | 2 | British Home Championship |
| 30 October 1926 | Ibrox Park, Glasgow | Scotland | 0–3 | 0 | British Home Championship |
| 29 October 1927 | Racecourse Ground, Wrexham | Scotland | 2–2 | 0 | British Home Championship |
| 17 November 1928 | Vetch Field, Swansea | England | 2–3 | 1 | British Home Championship |

== Honours ==
Swansea Town

- Football League Third Division South champions: 1924–25
