= William Forbes =

Billy, Willie or William Forbes may refer to:

== Financiers ==
- Sir William Forbes, 6th Baronet (1739–1806), Scottish banker
- William Forbes of Callendar (1756–1823), Scottish coppersmith and landowner
- William Howell Forbes (1837–1896), American businessman in Hong Kong
- William Hathaway Forbes (1840–1897), American investor in company owned by Alexander Graham Bell

== Footballers ==
- Billy Forbes (Scottish footballer) (before 1895–after 1928), right back who also played in Massachusetts
- Willie Forbes (1922–1999), Scottish wing half
- Billy Forbes (footballer, born 1990), Turks and Caicos Islands striker

== Public officials ==
- William Forbes (Lower Canada politician) (1787–1814), merchant and legislator
- William Forbes (MP) (1806–1855), Scottish MP for Stirlingshire
- William Henry Forbes (1815–1875), American fur trader and territorial legislator
- William Cameron Forbes (1870–1959), American diplomat and investment banker
- William Forbes (Talamancan king), King of Talamanca, Costa Rica between 1872 and 1880.

== Scholars ==
- William Forbes (bishop) (1585–1634), Scottish churchman, first Bishop of Edinburgh
- William S. Forbes (1831–1905), American physician
- William Alexander Forbes (1855–1883), English zoologist
- William T. M. Forbes (1885–1968), American entomologist

== Others ==
- William Forbes, 7th Lord Forbes (1513-1593), Scottish landowner
- William Nairn Forbes (1796–1855), British military engineer
- William Forbes (railway manager) (1856–1936), British railway manager
- William E. Forbes (1906–1999), member of the University of California Board of Regents
- William Garret Forbes (1751–1840), American silversmith

== See also ==
- William Forbes Mackenzie (1807–1862), Scottish Conservative politician
- William Forbes Skene (1809–1892), Scottish historian and antiquary
- William Forbes Gatacre (1843–1906), British general
- William Forbes-Sempill, 19th Lord Sempill (1893–1965), British engineer
