= International Football Hall of Fame (Manchester) =

- Established: 27 November 1997
- Founder: Professional Footballers' Association
- Inductees: 30

The International Football Hall of Fame, also known by its acronym as IFHoF, was a short-lived hall of fame in Manchester for professional footballers from all over the world. It was football's first organized hall of fame.

== Background ==
The International Football Hall of Fame started only a couple of months before FIFA launched its own International Football Hall of Champions.

The first 5 inductees to the International Football Hall of Fame were announced on 27 November 1997, alongside five more active players as future hall of famers. Twenty more retired players were announced on 28 November 1997, at a press conference. Only players who had been capped at least once and who had been retired for three years as of June 1997 were eligible for the inaugural selection. The Hall of Fame's chairman, Gordon Taylor, head of the Professional Footballers' Association, claimed their selection process collected more than 500,000 votes over the Internet and through the post from football fans in 110 countries.

It was the first ever worldwide voting over the best players of the 20th century in the history of the sport, three years before FIFA and IFFHS organised their own in 2000.

== Criteria ==
There were a few strict criteria for eligibility – as a result players like Diego Maradona (announced retirement on 29 October 1997) were not in the class of 1997. The players were chosen according to the following criteria:

- A player should have been retired for three years by 30 June of the year of election.
- A player should have gained at least one full international cap. Nominations were then collected (via post, email, internet). The list of nominations would then go to a selection committee.

The selection committee was consisted of an ex-player from each of the following countries:

- England; Germany; France; Switzerland; Sweden; Italy; Spain, from Europe (7)
- Uruguay; Chile, Argentina; Brazil, from South America (4)
- Mexico; US from CONCACAF (2)
- Japan from Asia (1)
- Morocco from Africa (1)
- Australia from Oceania (1)

The countries were chosen according to the following criteria:

- They must have had either won or hosted a FIFA World Cup.
- If a representative nation from continents was not represented through this would criterion, three more countries would be selected, so the procedure would be more inclusive: in Africa's case it was Morocco, in Oceania's it was Australia, while Japan represented Asia.

The selection committee narrowed the nominations down to 50. The list of 50 was then sent to a selected journalist from every FIFA registered country: the top five players each year would enter the Hall of Fame.

In the first year the top five nominees earned initial entrance and then 20 out of the list of 50 were allowed in.

== Voting and inauguration ==
The five players who received the most votes via a worldwide poll (Pele, Cruyff, Moore, Chalrton, Best) went straight into the Hall of Fame as the top 5. Panels of former international players and journalists determined the other vote-getters. Twenty more players were voted into the International Football Hall of Fame on 27 November 1997 in London.

George Best turned up for the inauguration ceremony which was held in a bar run by his former Northern Ireland team-mate, Terry Neill in London. George Best and several football legends, including Tom Finney, Nat Lofthouse, Gordon Banks, Alan Ball, Pat Jennings and Jim Baxter were present at the first ceremony of 1997. The legends attending the launch of the Hof were dubbed the Magnificent Seven by the organisers.

Another 25 players would be named in 1998 and the ceremony was planned to be housed in a museum in Manchester. The selection of new members was scheduled to be held annually.

== Inductees ==
=== Top 5 ===
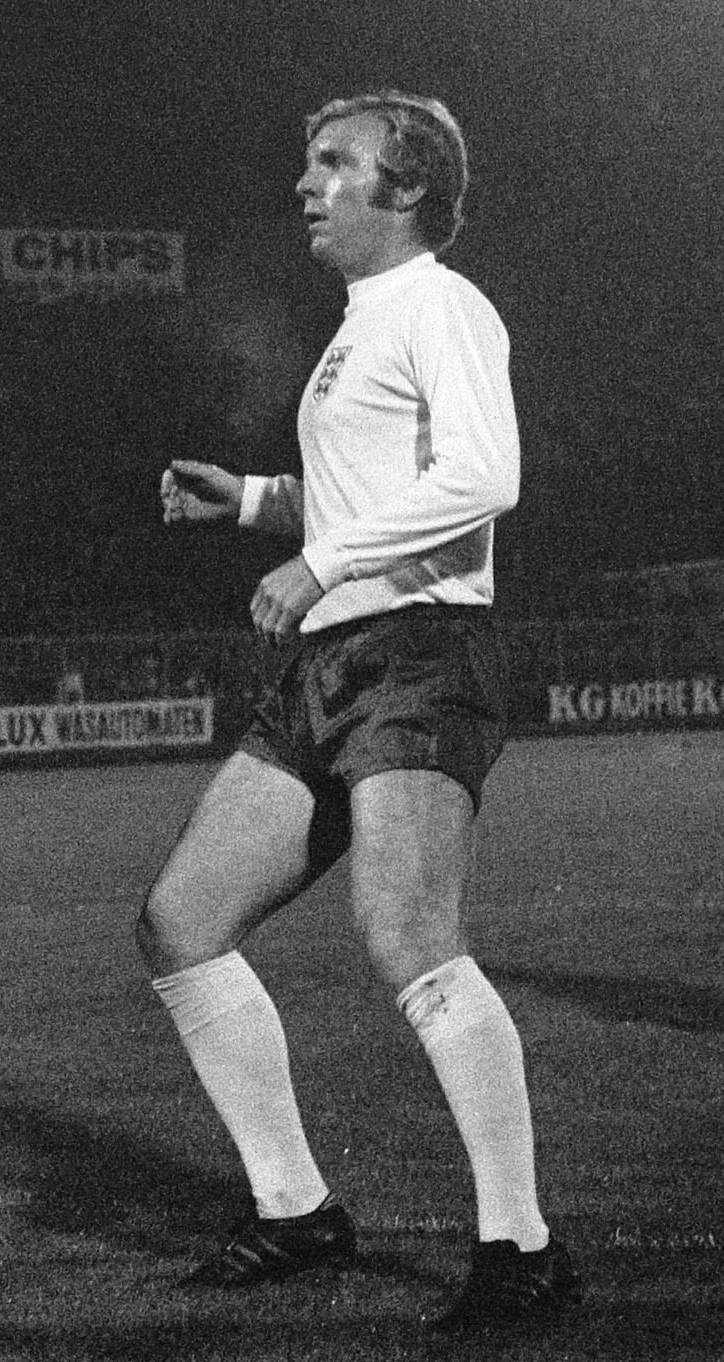
Bobby Moore was one of the first five inductees in the Class of 1997.

A total of 25 players were inaugural inductees in out of a list of 50 in 1997. The five players who received the most votes were automatically admitted to the Hall of Fame (Pele, George Best, Bobby Charlton, Johan Cruyff and Bobby Moore). The remaining 20 places were decided by two panels of footballers and sports journalists.

=== Next 20 ===
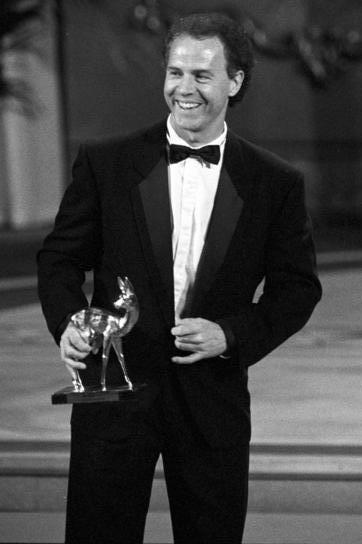
Franz Beckenbauer was voted below the Top 5, for the first induction class.

The 20 other Hall of Famers announced on 28 November 1997 were:

- (England) Gordon Banks
- (England) Duncan Edwards
- (England) Stanley Matthews
- (England) Billy Wright
- (England) Tom Finney
- (Wales) John Charles
- (Scotland) Kenny Dalglish
- (Germany) Gerd Muller
- (Germany) Franz Beckenbauer
- (Portugal) Eusebio
- (Brazil) Garrincha
- (Brazil) Roberto Rivellino
- (Brazil) Zico
- (Brazil) Jairzinho
- (France) Michel Platini
- (Argentina) Alfredo di Stefano
- (Netherlands) Marco van Basten
- (Hungary) Ferenc Puskas
- (Soviet Union) Lev Yashin
- (Italy) Dino Zoff

=== Ranking ===
The list according to the votes was as below:

Ranking	Inductee	Nationality
1	Pele	Brazil
2	George Best	Northern Ireland
3	Bobby Charlton	England
4	Johan Cruyff	Netherlands
5	Bobby Moore	England
6	Ferenc Puskas	Hungary
7	Gordon Banks	England
8	Marco van Basten	Netherlands
9	Franz Beckenbauer	Germany
10	John Charles	Wales
11	Kenny Dalglish	Scotland
12	Duncan Edwards	England
13	Eusebio	Portugal
14	Tom Finney	England
15	Garrincha	Brazil
16	Jairzinho	Brazil
17	Stanley Matthews	England
18	Gerd Muller	Germany
19	Michel Platini	France
20	Roberto Rivellino	Brazil
21	Alfredo Di Stefano	Argentina
22	Lev Yashin	Soviet Union
23	Billy Wright	England
24	Zico	Brazil
25	Dino Zoff	Italy

=== Future Hall of Famers ===
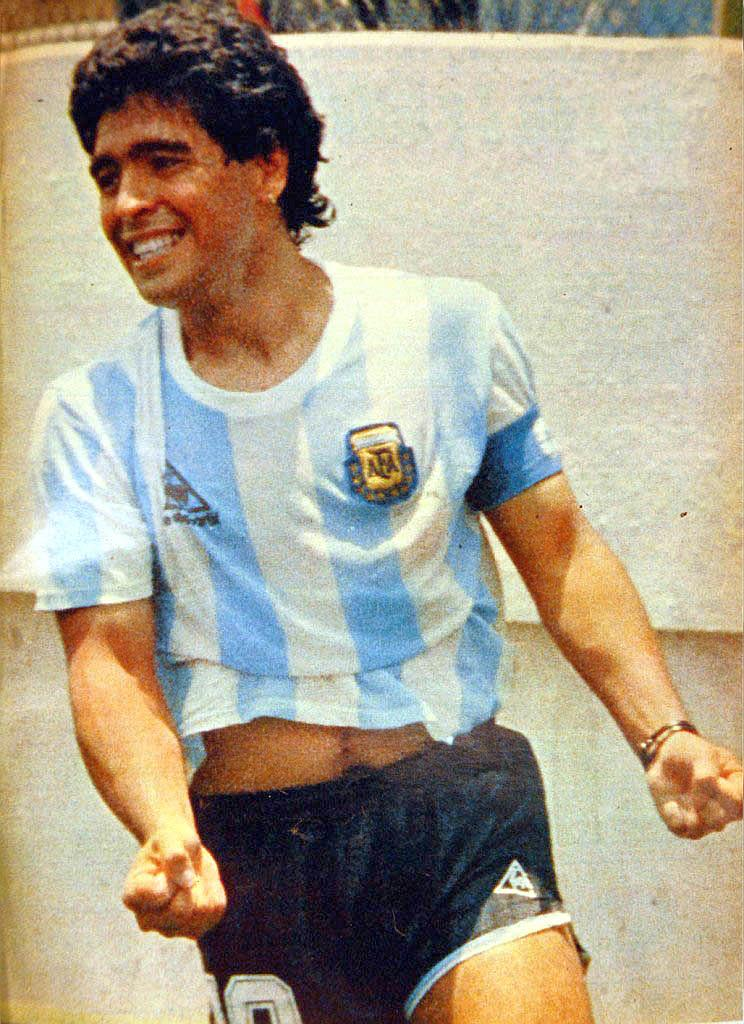
Diego Maradona was guaranteed a place in the Class of 2001, after retiring in 1997.

On 27 November 1997, it was announced announced that five active players were voted in and they would hold the title of a "Future Hall of Famer" securing a place in an upcoming class after retiring. Diego Maradona, Alan Shearer, Ronaldo Lima, George Weah and David Beckham were already guaranteed a HoF spot by the 1997 voters.

Ranking	Inductee	Nationality	Position	Career (Note: The years of the player's first and last appearance for a professional club or national team.)	Class (Note: Class is unofficial and it is calculated according to the year of retirement.)
1	Diego Maradona	Argentina	Midfielder; Forward	1976–1997	2001
2	Alan Shearer	England	Forward	1989–2006	2009
3	Ronaldo	Brazil	Forward	1993–2011	2014
4	George Weah	Liberia	Forward	1981–2003	2006
5	David Beckham	England	Defender	1992–2013	2016

== Nominees ==
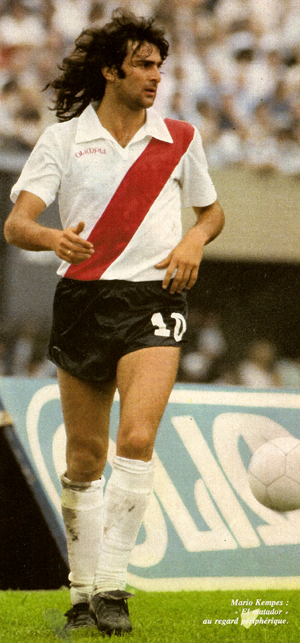
Mario Kempes was voted 9th for the IFHoF next class.

From 1998 until 2008 the IFHoF received voted for players to be inducted in the next class. However, none of them was officially inducted. The Top 10 nominees for the Hall of Fame voting (all must have been retired by 30 June 1998) according to the results in December 2008 were as below: (Note: All players apart from Gary Lineker and Mario Kempes were also eligible for selection in the 1997 class, but they had not been elected.)

- 1. (England) Gary Lineker
- 2. (Brazil) Socrates
- 3. (Scotland) Denis Law
- 4. (England) Kevin Keegan
- 5. (Italy) Paolo Rossi
- 6. (England) Geoff Hurst
- 7. (Germany) Karl-Heinz Rummenigge
- 8. (England) Jimmy Greaves
- 9. (Argentina) Mario Kempes
- 10. (Northern Ireland) Pat Jennings

Others outside the Top 10 were:

- 11. (Scotland) Billy Bremner
- 12. (Brazil) Didi
- 13. (Scotland) Alan Hansen
- 14. (Brazil) Nilton Santos

== Awards ==
=== IFHOF World Player of the Year ===
The IFHoF also gave out annual world awards. The Top 10 nominees for IFHOF Player of the Year for the 1998–1999 Season, according to the results were as below:

- 1. (France) Zinedine Zidane
- 2. (England) David Beckham
- 3. (Netherlands) Dennis Bergkamp
- 4. (Argentina) Diego Maradona (retired)
- 5. (Republic of Ireland) Roy Keane
- 6. (Brazil) Romario
- 7. (Italy) Roberto Baggio
- 8. (Brazil) Ronaldo
- 9. (Portugal) Gabriel Batistuta
- 10. (England) Michael Owen

Others outside the Top 10 were:

- 11. (Portugal) Luis Figo
- 12. (England) David Batty
- 13. (France) David Ginola
- 14. (England) Alan Shearer

== Controversy ==
=== FIFA's backlash ===
FIFA "was not thrilled with the competition" according to an Associated Press report, after the launch of IFHoF. FIFA spokesman Keith Cooper said, 'We have our own project, which bears the FIFA name, is truly international with international participation and very clearly defined rules. We cannot stop them doing their own but it would be better if there were only one."

The HoF website wrote that it would be "the one and only definitive 'International Football Hall Of Fame' and promised a neutral selection process: "And for the supporter it won't just be a dictatorial and arbitrary election process but one in which you play an integral part in how a player gets selected. Nor will it be biased towards any country or continent – as befits the global scope of 'the beautiful game' it is for the players and fans of every country."

The neutrality of the HoF over its selection was in doubt. The list contained a disproportionate number of British and Irish players, and—admitting "there were some accusations that we were being overtly parochial in terms of the suggestions listed for 'Hall Of Famers'". (as nine of the initial 25 players were from the United Kingdom.) Then, the organisers hastily published a second list "with not one single Englishman (or Scotsman, Welshman and Irishman) in sight."

=== Other public reaction ===
The Guardian's noted football journalist David Lacey had his reservation about the project. The Telegraph's Donald Trelfordhe also questioned its credibility in an article: "These saloon bar exercises can be a great way of showing off. Take this from The Guardian's David Lacey, a man who really knows his football: 'The absence of Raymond Kopa, Luis Suarez, Omar Sivori, Josef Masopust, Ernst Ocwirk, Juan Schiaffino and their like merely hardens the view that this is an essentially British exercise'. Well, yes, but then the Hall of Fame will be in Manchester. As for his list of forgotten players, I can vaguely remember Kopa, but the rest are a blank. In fact, when I first saw the exotic list of improbable names I checked that the date on The Guardian wasn't April 1."

On the other hand, players elected into HoF, like Pele seemed thrilled as he said: "To be chosen in a public vote, by more than half a million people from around the globe, as the number one player of all time is wonderful." George Best was also flattered: "I am thrilled to have been chosen by the public for a place in the International Football hall of fame – especially considering the company I'm keeping in the top five and the fact that I never actually played in a World Cup. It's a big compliment."

== The Museum ==
The organisers planned to build the International Hall of Fame in Manchester. The museum would be consisted of a complex. It would include the hall of fame at its exhibition center and incorporate multi-media attractions, themed restaurants and bars. After consultation with Professional Footballers Association, a mini-stadium and soccer academy was also planned to be built near the complex. The cost was calculated at $25 million.

The plan was for the museum to be opened in 1999, but it has not been built yet.

== Website ==
Typically the Hall of Fame is still active as its website is still live and accessible. Howeve, it has not been updated for many years. No members have been selected since the inaugural selection in 1997.

Various lists of all-time greats by Charlie Nicholas, Ian Wright, John Colquhoun, Mark Lawrenson have been published since then.

== Aftermath ==
FIFA's International Football Hall of Champions also has been abandoned, but in 2002 five days before the start of the World Cup, FIFA announced plans to open a new FIFA Hall of Fame in Valencia, Spain with a planned inauguration of November 2004. In 2001 the Soccer Hall of Fame in Pachuca was launched and it has been recognised by FIFA ever since.

== See also ==
- Soccer Hall of Fame
- IFFHS
