= Billy Wright (footballer, born 1900) =

English footballer

Personal information
- Full name: William Bulloch Wright
- Date of birth: 1900
- Place of birth: Sheffield, England
- Height: 5 ft 8 3/4 in (1.75 m)
- Positions: Wing half; inside forward

Senior career*
Years	Team	Apps	(Gls)
1921–1922	Southend United		
1922–1933	Bolton Wanderers	154	(21)
1933–1938	Reading		
1938–1939	Rouen	0	(0)

Managerial career
- 1938–1939: Rouen
- 1946: Leyton Orient (caretaker)
- * Club domestic league appearances and goals

William Bulloch Wright (born 1900) was an English footballer who played as a wing half or inside forward. He played in the Football League for Bolton Wanderers (spending a decade with the club, though only a regular for a few seasons – he did not feature in any of their three FA Cup Final victories in the period) and Reading (five seasons, making 193 appearances in all competitions).

He then moved to France to become manager of Rouen for the 1938–39 season (also registered as a player, he made no competitive appearances) but with the team threatened with relegation, he was replaced by compatriot Sid Kimpton prior to the last round of league fixtures. Wright then returned to England and was a trainer – and briefly caretaker manager in 1946 – of the newly renamed Leyton Orient, later following namesake Billy P. Wright to Chingford Town in 1948.

His father, Scotsman Jocky Wright, was also a footballer who played for several clubs across Britain including Bolton Wanderers and Sheffield Wednesday, where he was based when Billy was born; his brother Doug Wright (17 years younger and born in Southend-on-Sea where the family settled) played for Newcastle United and Lincoln City and was capped by England in 1938.
