= Jocky Wright =

Scottish footballer

Personal information
- Full name: John Wright
- Date of birth: 4 February 1873
- Place of birth: Hamilton, Scotland
- Date of death: 4 June 1946 (aged 73)
- Place of death: Rochford, England
- Position: Inside forward

Senior career*
Years	Team	Apps	(Gls)
1892–1893	Hamilton Academical		
1893–1894	Motherwell	7	(1)
1894	Hamilton Academical		
1894–1895	Clyde	18	(4)
1895–1898	Bolton Wanderers	85	(14)
1898–1902	The Wednesday	103	(42)
1902	Hamilton Academical	3	(1)
1902–1904	Bolton Wanderers	34	(5)
1904–1907	Plymouth Argyle	107	(17)
1907–1908	Watford	27	(0)
1908–1910	Southend United	56	(10)
Total		440	(94)
- * Club domestic league appearances and goals

John Wright (4 February 1873 – 4 June 1946) was a Scottish footballer who played in the Football League for Bolton Wanderers and The Wednesday, and the Southern League for Plymouth Argyle, Watford and Southend United. He was an inside forward.

== Career ==
Wright was born in Hamilton. He began his career with Hamilton Academical and played for Motherwell during their first Scottish Football League campaign before returning to Hamilton (who had yet to join the SFL). He then moved to Clyde, where he made 18 league appearances and scored four goals.

Wright switched to English football when he joined Bolton Wanderers in June 1895, and played regularly in his first three seasons with the club. He was transferred to The Wednesday in November 1898 having scored 14 league goals in 85 games for Bolton. In his second season with Wednesday (1899–1900), Wright was the club's leading goalscorer and received a Football League Second Division winner's medal. He scored 42 goals in 103 league appearances for Wednesday (and 110 and 43 including FA Cup ties).

He returned to Hamilton in September 1902 and then re-signed with Bolton the following month. In two more seasons with the club, Wright played in 34 league games and scored five times. Wright left the club in May 1904 and joined Plymouth Argyle, where he won the Western League First Division title in his second season. A club handbook states that Wright was "always clever, frequently brilliant and has never been known to play a bad game." He made 110 appearances for Argyle in all competitions and scored 17 goals before moving to Watford in May 1907. Wright played in 27 league games without scoring and then joined Southend United in May 1908.

In two seasons with Southend, he scored ten goals in 56 league appearances. Wright became the club's reserve team trainer in 1913 and went on to coach in the local area. Wright died in Southend-on-Sea in 1946.

== Personal life ==
He had two sons who were also footballers: Billy Wright played for Bolton and for Reading; Doug Wright played mainly for Newcastle United and Lincoln City, and was capped by England in 1938.

== Honours ==
- Football League Second Division: 1899–1900
- Western League First Division: 1904–05

== See also ==
- List of Bolton Wanderers F.C. players
- List of Plymouth Argyle F.C. players
- List of Sheffield Wednesday F.C. players
