= Willie Wright =

Willie or Willy Wright may refer to:

- Willie Wright (musician) (1939–2020), American soul singer and songwriter
- Willie Wright (American football, born 1968), American football linebacker and tight end
- Willie Wright (American football, born 1996), American football offensive lineman
- Willie Anne Wright (born 1924), American photographer
- Willy Wright (1917–2010), British civil servant and geologist

== See also ==
- William Wright (disambiguation)
