= Flip flap (association football) =

Dribbling move or feint in football

Flip flap

The flip flap (also known as the elástico, akka, snakebite, and la culebrita) is a dribbling move, or feint, in football used to trick a defensive player into thinking the offensive player, in possession of the ball, is going to move in a direction they do not intend to. Players perform it by using the outside of their dominant foot to push the ball towards their dominant side, then quickly move the dominant foot around the ball and using the inside to push the ball to their non-dominant side. Although the footwork is the most distinctive aspect of the flip-flap, its success as a feint also relies heavily on the attacking player having an explosive acceleration from a stationary position.

== History ==
"He (Sérgio Echigo) says now that he invented it, but I perfected it."

— Rivellino on the "flip flap"

The move was invented by the Brazilian-Japanese football player Sérgio Echigo. In 1964, Brazilian playmaker Rivellino learned the move from Echigo, who was his Corinthians teammate in the youth team, and performed it to a global audience during the 1970 FIFA World Cup. In an interview on the television series Football's Greatest in 2012, Rivellino stated "He [Echigo] says now that he invented it, but I perfected it". Pelé, Rivellino's national teammate, was never able to learn the move.

Rivellino was an idol to a number of players, and the trick was popularized early 1980s by Algerian Salah Assad (who developed his own flip flap, which he called "El Ghorraf", and which was executed while running with the ball, unlike Rivelino's), and also Peruvian Julio César Uribe; late 1990s and 2000s by high-profile players such as Romário, Ronaldo and Ronaldinho among others. In recent years, Portuguese footballer Cristiano Ronaldo, Brazilian footballer Neymar, and English footballer Marcus Rashford have also been known proponents of the move.

In Africa, especially Nigeria, the move has been referred to as a "Snakebite" or "Zigima" because of the in-and-out feet movement of the perpetrator. However, it is now more commonly called "The Gaúcho" – after Ronaldinho (Gaúcho).

In futsal, freestyle and street football, an aerial variation of the flip flap moves has been referred to as a "Akka". The "Akka" has several variations, and can be used in combos with pannas and other ground moves for doling out maximum punishment.

== See also ==
- Cruyff turn
- Marseille turn
- Rabona
- Step over
