= Doug Wright (footballer) =

English footballer and manager

Personal information
- Full name: John Douglas Wright
- Date of birth: 29 April 1917
- Place of birth: Rochford, England
- Date of death: 28 December 1992 (aged 75)
- Place of death: Bedlington, England
- Height: 6 ft 0 in (1.83 m)
- Positions: Defender; left half

Youth career
- Chelmsford City

Senior career*
| Years | Team | Apps | (Gls) |
| 1936–1937 | Southend United | 31 | (2) |
| 1938–1946 | Newcastle United | 74 | (1) |
| 1948–1954 | Lincoln City | 233 | (2) |
| 1954–1957 | Blyth Spartans | | |

International career
| 1938 | England | 1 | (0) |

Managerial career
- 1954–1957: Blyth Spartans (player-manager)
- * Club domestic league appearances and goals

John Douglas Wright (29 April 1917 – 28 December 1992) was an English professional footballer who played as a left half in the Football League for Southend United, Newcastle United and Lincoln City, where he won the Football League Third Division North title in 1951–52 and became player-coach before returning north to manage Blyth Spartans. While with Newcastle (where he played two full seasons in the Football League Second Division either side of World War II), he also made one appearance for the England national team in a 4–0 victory over Norway in 1938, aged 21 with the match played at his home ground St James' Park. His career was jeopardised by a leg injury sustained at the Battle of Dunkirk during the war but he was able to make a recovery.

His father, Scotsman Jocky Wright, was also a footballer who played for several clubs across Britain before settling in Southend-on-Sea; his brother Billy Wright (17 years older and born in Sheffield during an earlier stage of their father's career) played for Bolton Wanderers and Reading.
