= Rivellino =

Brazilian footballer and television pundit

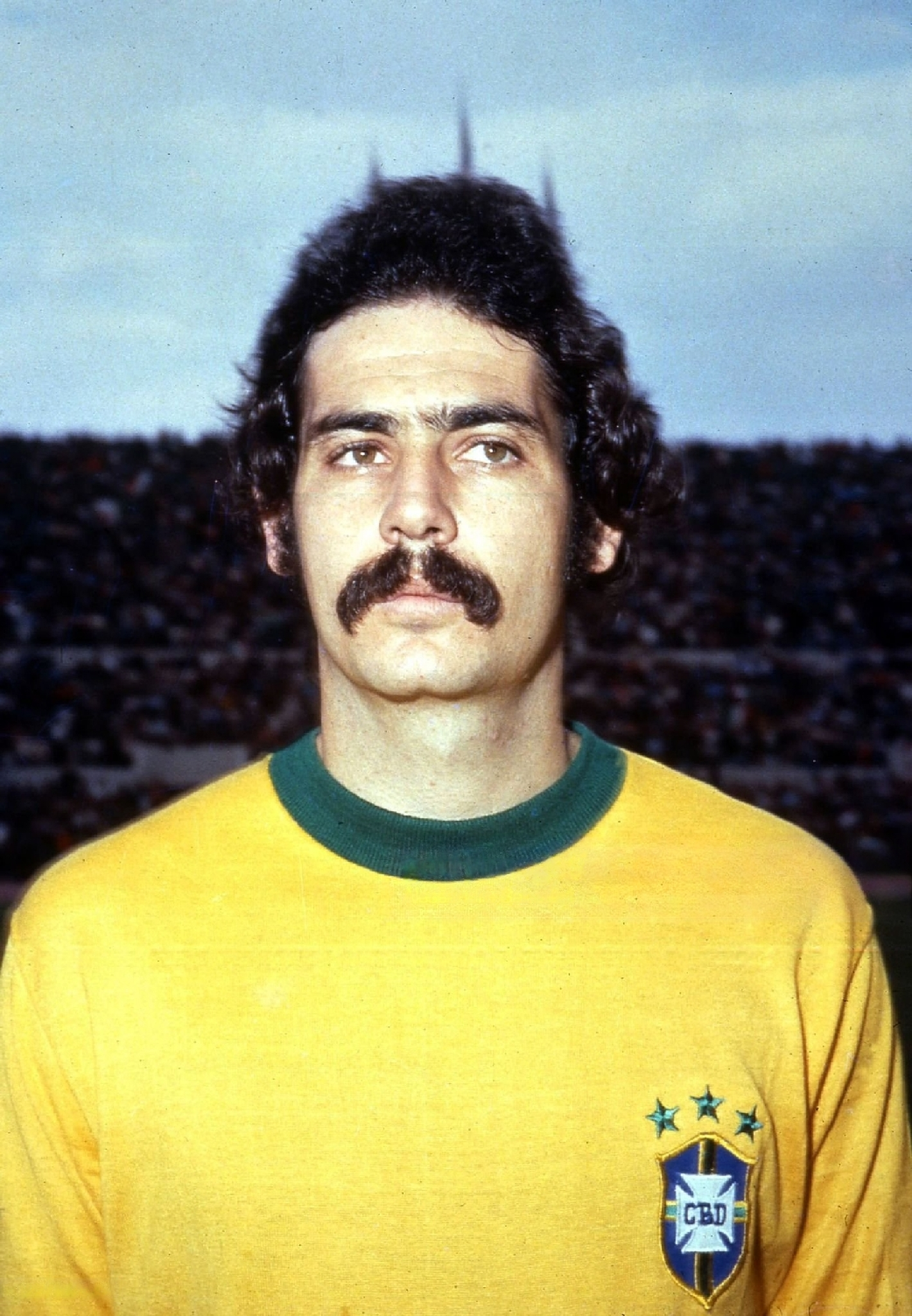
- Rivellino in 1974

Personal information
- Full name: Roberto Rivellino
- Date of birth: 1 January 1946 (age 80)
- Place of birth: São Paulo, Brazil
- Height: 1.69 m (5 ft 7 in)
- Position: Attacking midfielder

Youth career
- 1962: C.A. Barcelona
- 1963–1964: Corinthians

Senior career*
Years	Team	Apps	(Gls)
1965–1974	Corinthians	236	(70)
1975–1978	Fluminense	45	(10)
1978–1981	Al-Hilal	57	(25)
Total		338	(105)

International career
1965–1978	Brazil	92	(26)

Managerial career
- 1994: Shimizu S-Pulse
Medal record
Men's Football
Representing Brazil
FIFA World Cup
Winner	1970 Mexico
Third place	1978 Argentina
- * Club domestic league appearances and goals

Roberto Rivellino (Brazilian Portuguese: [ʁoˈbɛʁtu ʁiveˈlĩnu]; born 1 January 1946), known mononymously as Rivellino, is a Brazilian football pundit and former player who was one of the key members of Brazil's 1970 FIFA World Cup-winning team.

The son of Italian immigrants from Macchiagodena, Isernia, Rivellino played as an attacking midfielder and was renowned for his iconic moustache, powerful long-range shooting, accurate passing, vision, close control, dribbling and ability to bend free kicks. In 2004, he was named by Pelé in the FIFA 100 list of the world's greatest living players.

Rivellino currently works as a pundit for TV Cultura.

== Club career ==
Rivellino was born in São Paulo, and started as a futsal player at Clube Atlético Barcelona. After that, he tried his luck with Barcelona's biggest rival, Corinthians, where he moved on to professional football and quickly became a favourite of the fans—and was therefore nicknamed "O Rei do Parque" (King of the Park) (after the club's home ground, Parque São Jorge). However, the late 60s and early 70s were one of the most troubled periods in the history of the club, which did not win a single São Paulo state league title between 1954 and 1977.

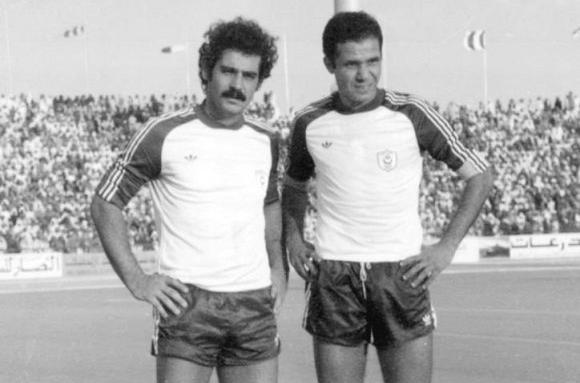
Rivellino (left) playing in Saudi Arabia in 1979

In 1974, after Corinthians was defeated by arch-rivals Palmeiras in the São Paulo league finals, as the star player Rivellino was singled out by most fans as one of the most responsible for not winning. He moved on to Rio de Janeiro, where he defended Fluminense until the end of the 1970s. Rivellino was undoubtedly the greatest star in the excellent Fluminense of the mid 70s, dubbed "the tricolor machine", among Doval, Pintinho, Gil and Carlos Alberto Torres. He won the Rio de Janeiro league championship in 1975 and 1976. By the end of the decade, he moved on to play for Al Hilal in Saudi Arabia; he retired from professional football in 1981.

== International career ==
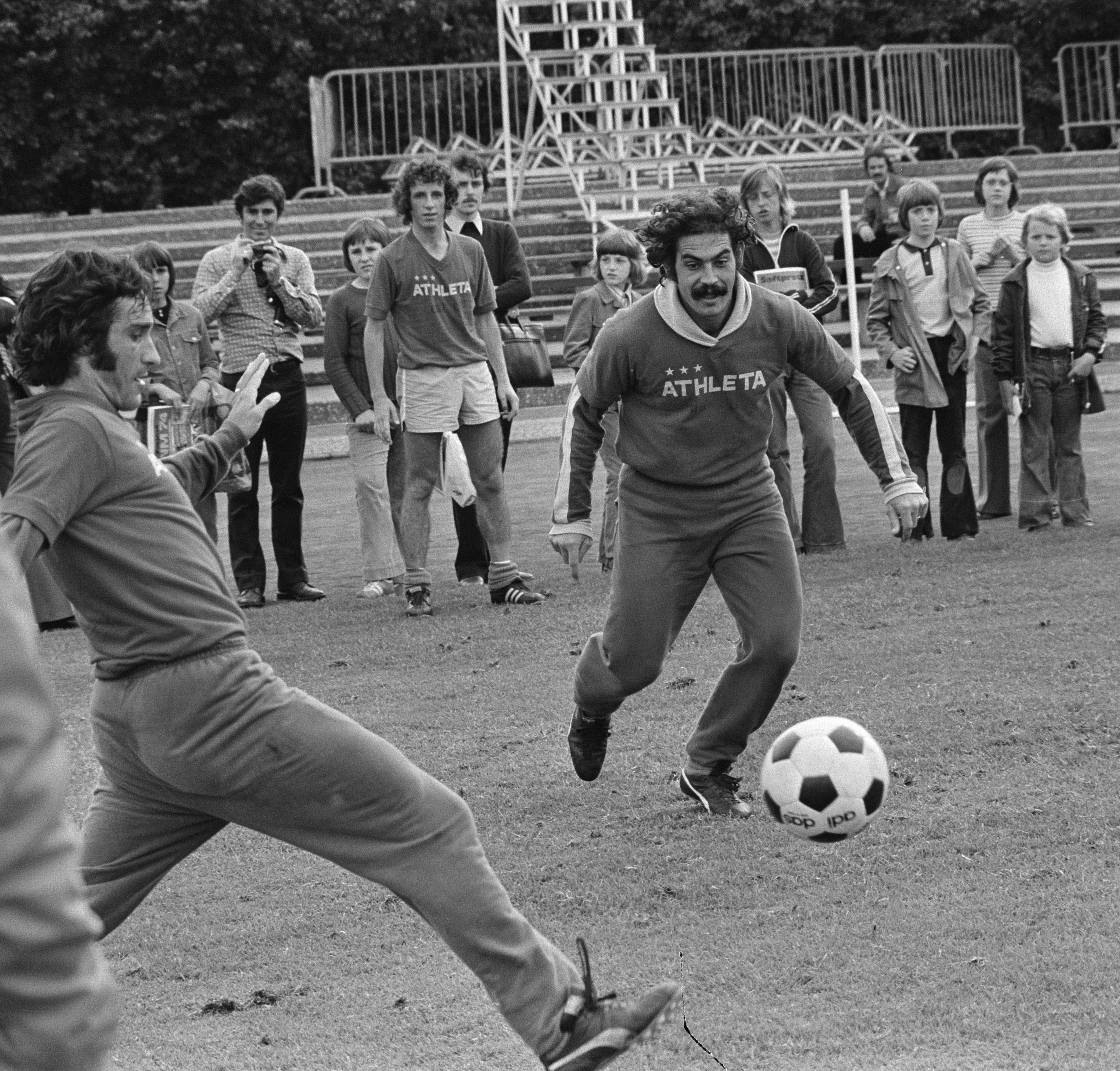
Rivellino with Brazil in 1974

Rivellino was a key member of Brazil's 1970 FIFA World Cup winning team, which is often cited as the greatest-ever World Cup team. Wearing the number 11 jersey, Rivellino was deployed on the left side of midfield and scored three goals, including the powerful bending free-kick against Czechoslovakia, which earned him the nickname "Patada Atómica" (Atomic Kick) by Mexican fans. Rivellino also played in the 1974 and 1978 FIFA World Cups, finishing in fourth and third place respectively.

== Style of play ==
"He (Sérgio Echigo) says now that he invented it, but I perfected it"

— Rivellino on the "flip flap".

Rivellino has been called one of the greatest players of all time. He played as an attacking midfielder and was known for his ability to bend free kicks, long-range shooting, accurate long passing, vision, close ball control and dribbling skills. He also claimed to have perfected the flip flap, which was later adopted by players including Romário, Mágico González, Ronaldo, Ronaldinho and Cristiano Ronaldo. Known for his close control, feints and left-footed ability, Rivellino was named by Diego Maradona as one of his greatest childhood inspirations.

== After retirement ==
After his professional retirement, Rivellino started a career as a football commentator and coach (he has managed Shimizu S-Pulse in Japan's J. League). Rivellino further represented Brazil in the 1989 edition of the World Cup of Masters, scoring in the final against Uruguay. Rivellino is sometimes credited with scoring the fastest goal in football history when he supposedly scored a goal direct from the kick-off after noticing the opposition goalkeeper on his knees finishing off pre-match prayers.

Regarding the 2014 FIFA World Cup held in his country, Rivellino criticized the inclusion of the Amazonian city of Manaus with its stadium Arena da Amazônia in the hosting venues, saying "it’s absurd to play in Manaus. You start sweating the moment you leave the locker room".

== Career statistics ==
=== International ===
Appearances and goals by national team and year
National team	Year	Apps	Goals
Brazil	1965	1	0
Brazil	1968	17	6
Brazil	1969	1	1
Brazil	1970	8	5
Brazil	1971	7	1
Brazil	1972	5	0
Brazil	1973	9	3
Brazil	1974	15	6
Brazil	1976	8	1
Brazil	1977	12	3
Brazil	1978	8	0
Total		91	26

Scores and results list Brazil's goal tally first, score column indicates score after each Rivellino goal.

List of international goals scored by Rivellino
No.	Date	Venue	Opponent	Score	Result	Competition	Ref.
1	20 June 1968	10th-Anniversary Stadium, Warsaw, Poland	Poland	2–2	6–3	Friendly	
2	20 June 1968	10th-Anniversary Stadium, Warsaw, Poland	Poland	6–3	6–3	Friendly	
3	30 June 1968	Estádio da Machava, Matola, Mozambique	Portugal	–	2–0	Friendly	
4	10 July 1968	Estadio Azteca, Mexico City, Mexico	Mexico	1–1	1–2	Friendly	
5	17 July 1968	Estadio Nacional del Perú, Lima, Peru	Peru	1–0	4–0	Friendly	
6	6 November 1968	Maracanã Stadium, Rio de Janeiro, Brazil	FIFA World XI	1–0	2–1	Friendly	
7	21 August 1969	Maracanã Stadium, Rio de Janeiro, Brazil	Colombia	5–1	6–2	1970 FIFA World Cup qualification	
8	26 March 1970	Maracanã Stadium, Rio de Janeiro, Brazil	Chile	–	2–1	Friendly	
9	29 April 1970	Maracanã Stadium, Rio de Janeiro, Brazil	Austria	1–0	1–0	Friendly	
10	3 June 1970	Estadio Jalisco, Guadalajara, Mexico	Czechoslovakia	1–1	4–1	1970 FIFA World Cup	
11	14 June 1970	Estadio Jalisco, Guadalajara, Mexico	Peru	1–0	4–2	1970 FIFA World Cup	
12	17 June 1970	Estadio Jalisco, Guadalajara, Mexico	Uruguay	3–1	3–1	1970 FIFA World Cup	
13	18 July 1971	Maracanã Stadium, Rio de Janeiro, Brazil	Yugoslavia	1–1	2–2	Friendly	
14	27 May 1973	Maracanã Stadium, Rio de Janeiro, Brazil	Bolivia	–	5–0	Friendly	
15	27 May 1973	Maracanã Stadium, Rio de Janeiro, Brazil	Bolivia	–	5–0	Friendly	
16	3 June 1973	Stade du 5 Juillet, Algiers, Algeria	Algeria	–	2–0	Friendly	
17	21 April 1974	Estádio Governador Hélio Prates da Silveira, Brasília, Brazil	Haiti	–	4–0	Friendly	
18	5 May 1974	Maracanã Stadium, Rio de Janeiro, Brazil	Republic of Ireland	2–0	2–1	Friendly	
19	12 May 1974	Maracanã Stadium, Rio de Janeiro, Brazil	Paraguay	–	2–0	Friendly	
20	22 June 1974	Parkstadion, Gelsenkirchen, Germany	Zaire	2–0	3–0	1974 FIFA World Cup	
21	22 June 1974	Niedersachsenstadion, Hanover, Germany	East Germany	1–0	1–0	1974 FIFA World Cup	
22	30 June 1974	Niedersachsenstadion, Hanover, Germany	Argentina	1–0	2–1	1974 FIFA World Cup	
23	28 April 1976	Maracanã Stadium, Rio de Janeiro, Brazil	Uruguay	–	2–1	1976 Taça do Atlântico	
24	9 March 1977	Maracanã Stadium, Rio de Janeiro, Brazil	Colombia	6–0	6–0	1978 FIFA World Cup qualification	
25	12 June 1977	Maracanã Stadium, Rio de Janeiro, Brazil	West Germany	–	1–1	Friendly	
26	19 June 1977	Estádio do Morumbi, São Paulo, Brazil	Poland	–	3–1	Friendly	

=== Managerial ===
Team	From	To	Record				
Team	From	To	G	W	D	L	Win %
Shimizu S-Pulse	1994	1994	22	11	0	11	50.00
Total			22	11	0	11	50.00

== Honours ==
Corinthians

- Torneio Rio-São Paulo: 1966

Fluminense

- Campeonato Carioca: 1975, 1976

Al Hilal

- Saudi Premier League: 1978–79
- King Cup: 1980

Brazil

- FIFA World Cup: 1970

Individual

- FIFA World Cup All-Star Team player: 1970; third place: 1978
- Bola de Prata Brazilian Championship All-Star Team: 1971
- World Soccer World XI: 1971
- World Soccer: 38th Greatest Player of the 20th Century
- CONMEBOL All-Star Team: 1973
- Bronze ball South American Footballer of the Year: 1973, 1976
- Silver ball South American Footballer of the Year: 1977
- FIFA 100 Greatest Living Footballers: 2004
- Premio Golden Foot Award (Football Legend Award): 2005
- The Best of The Best – Player of the Century: Top 50
- IFFHS Brazilian Player of the 20th Century (12th place)
- Brazilian Football Museum Hall of Fame
- International Football Hall of Fame: 20th place (1997)

== See also ==
- List of FIFA World Cup top goalscorers
