= Sérgio Echigo =

Japanese-Brazilian footballer

Sergio Echigo
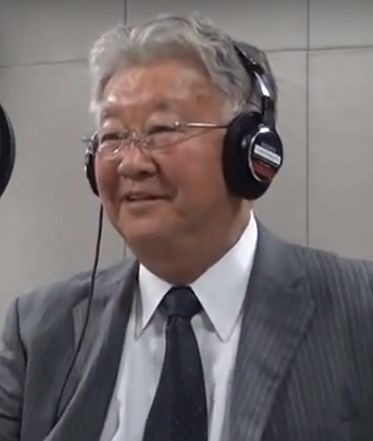

Personal information
- Full name: Sergio Echigo
- Date of birth: 28 July 1945 (age 81)
- Place of birth: São Paulo, Brazil
- Height: 1.73 m (5 ft 8 in)
- Position: Midfielder

Senior career*
Years	Team	Apps	(Gls)
1964–1965	Corinthians	11	(0)
1967–1968	Trespontano	?	(?)
1971	Bragantino	?	(?)
?	Paulista	?	(?)
1972–1974	Towa Estate Development	40	(6)
- * Club domestic league appearances and goals

Sérgio Echigo (セルジオ 越後, Serujio Echigo; born 28 July 1945) is a Brazilian former footballer and commentator of Japanese descent who played as a midfielder.

He joined the Corinthians in 1963 and played for Towa Real Estate S.C. in the Japan Soccer League between 1972 and 1974.

== Playing style ==
A highly technical player, Echigo was renowned for his feints and dribbling skills. He is responsible for inventing the dribbling move known as 'Elastico', or 'flip-flap', a move which Brazilian legend Rivellino acquired from him and perfected while they were teammates at Corinthians in 1964.

== Honours ==
Towa Estate Development

- JSL Cup: 1973

Individual

- Japan Soccer League Best Eleven: 1973, 1974
- Order of the Rising Sun, 5th Class, Gold and Silver Rays: 2017
- Japan Football Hall of Fame: Inducted in 2023
