= Billy Wright (Australian footballer) =

Australian rules footballer, born 1900

Personal information
- Full name: William Albert Wright
- Born: 15 August 1900; Richmond, Victoria
- Died: 3 June 1983 (aged 82); Warrnambool, victoria
- Original team: Hawthorn Districts

Playing career^{1}
Years	Club	Games (Goals)
1922–23	Richmond	3 (0)
- ^{1} Playing statistics correct to the end of 1923.

William Albert Wright (15 August 1900 – 3 June 1983) was an Australian rules footballer who played with Richmond in the Victorian Football League (VFL).
