= Patsy Corcoran =

Scottish footballer (1893–1967)

Personal information
- Full name: Patrick Corcoran
- Date of birth: 16 June 1893
- Place of birth: Glasgow, Scotland
- Date of death: 1967 (aged 73–74)
- Position: Outside right

Senior career*
Years	Team	Apps	(Gls)
- Bellshill Athletic
- Mossend Celtic
1912–1919	Clyde	37	(2)
1913	→ Shelbourne (loan)		
1915	→ Shelbourne (loan)		
1915–1916	→ Royal Albert (loan)		
1916–1917	→ Hamilton Academical (loan)	23	(5)
1917	→ Renton (loan)		
1917–1918	→ Albion Rovers (loan)		
1918	→ Celtic (loan)	3	(0)
1919	→ Royal Albert (loan)		
1919–1920	Hamilton Academical	17	(2)
1920	→ Bathgate (loan)		
1920–1926	Plymouth Argyle	188	(26)
1926	Torquay United	0	(0)
1926	Luton Town	0	(0)
1926	Bathgate	4	(1)
1926–1927	East Stirlingshire	2	(0)
- * Club domestic league appearances and goals

Patrick Corcoran (16 June 1893 – 1967) was a Scottish professional footballer who played as an outside right for Clyde, Celtic, and Hamilton Academical in the Scottish Football League and for Plymouth Argyle in the English Football League.

== Career ==
Corcoran was born in Glasgow. He was on the books of Clyde for several years and won a Glasgow Cup with the club in 1914 but played on loan with various clubs including Celtic and Hamilton Academical, where he then had a permanent (though still fairly brief) spell.

He moved to England in late 1920 to play for Plymouth Argyle. He made 198 appearances for the club in all competitions over six seasons, the last of which came in December 1925; he remained with the club til the following summer but was recovering from appendicitis. In 1923 he was selected for the Home Scots v Anglo-Scots international trial match alongside Plymouth teammate Fred Craig (with whom he had also played at Hamilton), though neither would gain a full cap.

He then spent a short period at Torquay United, then still a Southern League club, before joining Luton Town, but is believed not to have played for either in competitive fixtures. He returned to Scotland for additional fleeting spells at Bathgate and East Stirlingshire.

Corcoran died in 1967.
