= Frank Cosgrove =

English footballer

Personal information
- Full name: Francis Michael Cosgrove
- Date of birth: 5 December 1894
- Place of birth: Crook, County Durham
- Date of death: 7 March 1957 aged 62
- Place of death: Kirkburton, Huddersfield
- Position: Right back

Youth career
- –: Felling Colliery

Senior career*
| Years | Team | Apps | (Gls) |
- Durham City
| 1920–1931 | Plymouth Argyle | 103 | (0) |
- Benfield Colliery
- * Club domestic league appearances and goals

Frank Cosgrove (5 December 1894 - 7 March 1957) also known as Fred Cosgrove, was an English professional footballer who made 103 appearances in the Football League for Plymouth Argyle. He played as a right back. Cosgrove was born in Crook, County Durham, and played football for home town club Durham City before joining Plymouth Argyle in 1920. He made 105 appearances for the club in all competitions.
