= William Horne (footballer) =

English footballer

Personal information
- Full name: William Henry Horne
- Date of birth: 19 April 1881
- Place of birth: Plymouth, England
- Date of death: 13 July 1941 (aged 60)
- Place of death: Sutton, Surrey, England
- Position: Goalkeeper

Senior career*
Years	Team	Apps	(Gls)
–	Tavistock		
–	Essa		
1904–1906	Plymouth Argyle	54	(0)
1906–1907	Fulham	3	(0)
1907–1920	Plymouth Argyle	169	(0)
- * Club domestic league appearances and goals

William Henry Horne (19 April 1881 – 13 July 1941) was an English footballer who played in the Southern League for Plymouth Argyle and Fulham. He was a goalkeeper. Horne served with the Duke of Cornwall's Light Infantry in South Africa during the Second Boer War.

== Life and career ==
Horne was born in Plympton. He served with the Duke of Cornwall's Light Infantry in South Africa during the Second Boer War before returning to play football in Devon and Cornwall. Horne played for Tavistock and Essa prior to joining Plymouth Argyle on amateur terms in January 1904. He served as understudy to Jack Robinson in his first season and made three appearances before signing a professional contract. He became the club's first choice goalkeeper during the 1904–05 season but eventually lost his place in the team after Argyle signed England international John Willie Sutcliffe. Horne joined Fulham in May 1906 and made three appearances in his one season with the club.

He returned to Argyle the following year and spent the next four seasons as understudy to Sutcliffe. Horne became the club's first choice again in 1911–12 and the following season he received a Southern League winners medal. He made his last appearance for Argyle in November 1914 before losing his place in the side to Fred Craig. His career was then interrupted by the outbreak of war as competitive football was suspended in 1915. Horne remained on the club's books and was a member of the squad for the 1919–20 season, serving as back-up to Craig, but did not add to his 240 appearances for Argyle in all competitions and then retired due to ill health. Horne died in Sutton, London, (then part of Surrey) in 1941.

== Honours ==
- Western League First Division: 1904–05
- Southern League First Division: 1912–13
