= John Brimacombe =

English footballer

Personal information
- Date of birth: 25 November 1958 (age 67)
- Place of birth: Saltash, England
- Position: Full back

Senior career*
| Years | Team | Apps | (Gls) |
- Saltash United
| 1985–1990 | Plymouth Argyle | 98 | (3) |
| Total | | 98 | (3) |
- * Club domestic league appearances and goals

John Brimacombe (born 25 November 1958) is an English retired footballer who played as a full back.

He was playing part-time for Saltash United and combining it with his job at Devonport Dockyard when he was signed by Plymouth Argyle in 1985. He made his debut in January 1986 at the age of 27 and scored one of the club's goals against York City. He enjoyed his best season with the club two years later after succeeding Gordon Nisbet as the club's first choice right back, making 47 appearances during the 1987–88 season. The emergence of Kenny Brown the following season saw Brimacombe move into midfield, but his appearances in the team became more sporadic. He was released in 1990, having made 113 appearances in all competitions for Argyle. He then returned to part-time football.
