= William Wright (surgeon) =

British aural surgeon

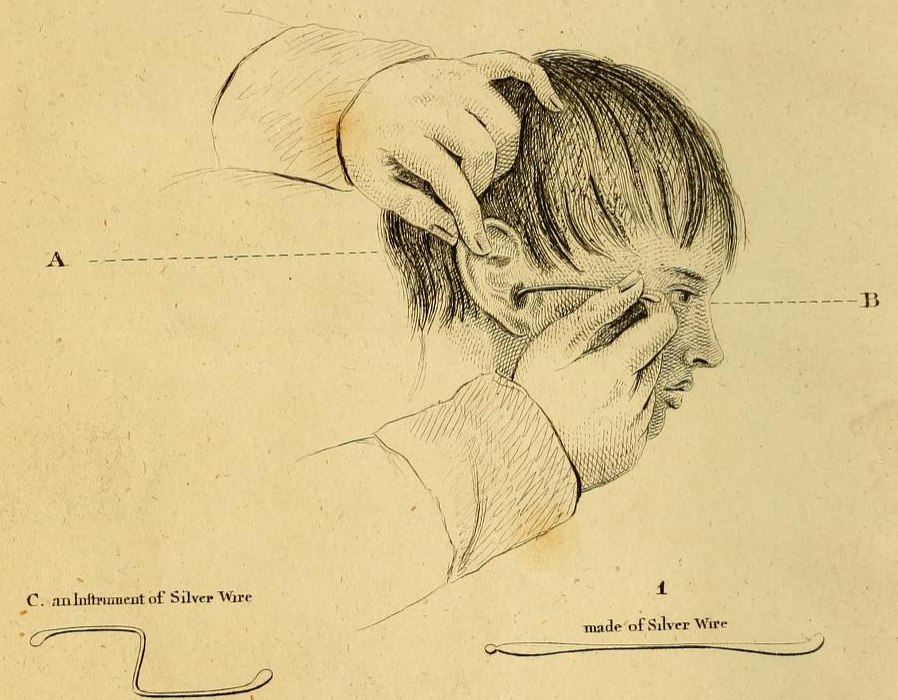
Illustration from Wright's book, An Essay on the Human Ear, London, 1817

William Wright (1773–1860) was a British aural surgeon.

== Biography ==
Wright was born at Dartford in Kent on 28 May 1773, was son of William and Margaret Wright. Wright was educated under John Cunningham Saunders, and was therefore in all probability a student of St. Thomas's Hospital. He does not appear to have obtained any medical diploma or license, but he proceeded to Bristol, where he began his professional career in 1796. Here Miss Anna Thatcher came under his care. She was almost deaf and dumb, but his method of treatment was so successful that in a year she could repeat words, and in 1817 she had a long audience and conversation with Queen Charlotte. Her majesty thereupon appointed Wright her surgeon-aurist in ordinary. He moved to London and soon acquired a large and fashionable practice. He began to attend the Duke of Wellington in 1823, and remained one of his medical attendants until the death of the duke. Wright died on 21 March 1860 in Duke Street, St. James's Square, London.

== Works ==
Wright's works were:

1. An Essay on the Human Ear, London, 1817, 8vo.
2. On the Varieties of Deafness, London, 1829, 8vo.
3. A few Minutes' Advice to Deaf Persons, London, 1839, 12mo.
4. Deafness and Diseases of the Ear: the Fallacies of present Treatment exposed and Remedies suggested. From the Experience of half a century, London, 1860, 8vo.
