= Billy Forbes (Scottish footballer) =

Scottish footballer

Personal information
- Full name: William Forbes
- Date of birth: Not known
- Place of birth: Denny, Scotland
- Date of death: Not known
- Position: Right back

Senior career*
| Years | Team | Apps | (Gls) |
- Denny Hibernian
| 1911–1924 | Plymouth Argyle | 235 | (1) |
| 1925–1926 | Fall River | 4 | (0) |
- * Club domestic league appearances and goals

William Forbes was a Scottish professional footballer who played in the English Football League for Plymouth Argyle in the 1920s. He played as a right back.

Forbes was born in Denny, which was then in Stirlingshire, and played for the local club, Denny Hibernian, before coming to England in 1911 to play for Plymouth Argyle, then a Southern League club. He made 250 appearances for the club in all competitions either side of the First World War. Forbes played in Argyle's first game in the Football League, as the Southern League Division One clubs were absorbed to form the Football League Third Division for the 1920–21 season, and went on to play 134 Football League games. Best remembered for his full-back partnership with Moses Russell – they played more than 180 games together – Forbes made his last appearance for Argyle in 1924 and then went to America to play for Fall River
