= Tommy Gallogley =

Scottish footballer

Personal information
- Full name: Thomas Gallogley
- Date of birth: 9 April 1890
- Place of birth: Larkhall, Scotland
- Date of death: 1976 (aged 85–86)
- Position: Inside forward

Senior career*
| Years | Team | Apps | (Gls) |
| – | Bedlay Juniors | | |
| 1913–1923 | Plymouth Argyle | 125 | (21) |
| 1916–1917 | → Motherwell (guest) | 7 | (0) |
| 1918–1919 | → Airdrieonians (guest) | 8 | (0) |
| 1923–1924 | Exeter City | 21 | (1) |
| 1924–1925 | Albion Rovers | 29 | (1) |
| 1925–1926 | Queen of the South | 1 | (0) |
- * Club domestic league appearances and goals

Thomas Gallogley (9 April 1890 – 1976) was a Scottish professional footballer who scored 10 goals from 83 appearances in the English Football League playing for Plymouth Argyle and Exeter City in the 1920s. He played as an inside forward.

Gallogley was born in Larkhall, South Lanarkshire. He played football for Bedlay Juniors before coming to England in 1913 to play for Plymouth Argyle, then a Southern League club. In a career interrupted by World War I, he made 136 appearances for the club in all competitions, including 62 spread across three seasons in the English Football League. During the war he played as a guest for Motherwell, Airdrieonians, Albion Rovers and Vale of Leven. Gallogley played his last game for Argyle in 1923, and then spent a season with Exeter City.

He then returned to Scotland, where he was on the books of Dumfries club Queen of the South and Albion Rovers. He died in 1976.
