= Billy Wright (football manager) =

English footballer and manager

Personal information
- Full name: William Peter Wright
- Date of birth: 8 May 1903
- Place of birth: Southwark, England
- Date of death: October 1983 (aged 80)
- Place of death: Birmingham, England
- Position: Centre half

Senior career*
Years	Team	Apps	(Gls)
1931–1932	Clapton Orient	1	(0)

Managerial career
- 1939–1945: Clapton Orient
- Chingford Town
- * Club domestic league appearances and goals

William Peter Wright (8 May 1903 – October 1983) was an English football player and manager, best remembered for his long association with Leyton Orient, whom he served as a player, manager, trainer and masseur.

== Career statistics ==
Appearances and goals by club, season and competition
Club	Season	League			FA Cup		Total	
Club	Season	Division	Apps	Goals	Apps	Goals	Apps	Goals
Clapton Orient	1931–32	Third Division South	1	0	0	0	1	0
Career total			1	0	0	0	1	0
