= Fred Craig (footballer) =

Scottish footballer

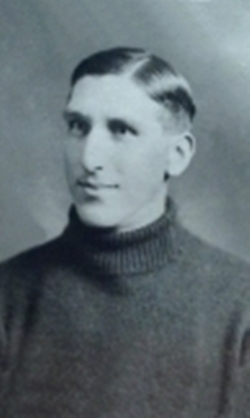
- Craig while with Plymouth Argyle in 1921

Personal information
- Full name: Frederick Glover Craig
- Date of birth: 16 January 1891
- Place of birth: Larkhall, Scotland
- Date of death: 30 August 1966 (aged 75)
- Place of death: Larkhall, Scotland
- Position: Goalkeeper

Youth career
- –1909: Glenview

Senior career*
| Years | Team | Apps | (Gls) |
| 1909–1910 | Larkhall United | | |
| 1910–1911 | Ross Rovers | | |
| 1911–1912 | Larkhall Thistle | | |
| 1912–1915 | Plymouth Argyle | 38 | (0) |
- Royal Albert
- St Johnstone
| 1915–1916 | Vale of Leven | | |
| 1916–1917 | Hamilton Academical | 42 | (0) |
| 1917 | Brentford | 1 | (0) |
| 1918 | Ayr United | 3 | (0) |
| 1918–1919 | Motherwell | 29 | (0) |
| 1919 | Clydebank | 1 | (0) |
| 1919 | Larkhall Thistle | | |
| 1919–1930 | Plymouth Argyle | 401 | (5) |
| 1930–1931 | Barrow | 14 | (0) |
- * Club domestic league appearances and goals

Frederick Glover Craig (16 January 1891 – 30 August 1966) was a Scottish professional footballer who played as a goalkeeper, best remembered for his two spells with Plymouth Argyle, for whom he made over 430 appearances in the Southern League and the Football League. Craig made more appearances for the club than any other goalkeeper.

== Club career ==
A goalkeeper, Craig began his career in Scottish junior football, before moving to England to join Southern League First Division club Plymouth Argyle in 1912. He made just four appearances during the 1912–13 season, in which Argyle won the Southern League First Division title. He succeeded Titch Horne as Argyle's first choice goalkeeper midway through 1914–15, but the outbreak of the First World War in August 1914 led to the cessation of competitive football in England at the end of the season, for the duration of the conflict.

Craig returned to Scotland to play competitive Scottish League football during the war and turned out for several clubs (most notably Hamilton Academical and Motherwell), before re-joining Plymouth Argyle in time for the beginning of the 1919–20 season. Argyle were elevated into the Football League Third Division for the 1920–21 season and Craig remained with the club until the end of the 1929–30 season, when he captained the team to the Third Division South championship. During his 14 seasons at Home Park, Craig made 467 appearances and scored five goals. Towards the end of his Argyle career, he occasionally filled in as the team's penalty taker. Craig finished his career with a short spell at Third Division North club Barrow.

== International career ==
In 1923, Craig was selected for the Home Scots v Anglo-Scots international trial match alongside Plymouth Argyle teammate Patsy Corcoran (with whom he had also played at Hamilton Academical), though neither gained a full cap.

== Career statistics ==
Appearances and goals by club, season and competition
| Club | Season | League | | | National Cup | | Total | |
| Club | Season | Division | Apps | Goals | Apps | Goals | Apps | Goals |
|---|---|---|---|---|---|---|---|---|
| Plymouth Argyle | 1912–13 | Southern League First Division | 4 | 0 | 0 | 0 | 4 | 0 |
| Plymouth Argyle | 1913–14 | Southern League First Division | 10 | 0 | 0 | 0 | 10 | 0 |
| Plymouth Argyle | 1914–15 | Southern League First Division | 24 | 0 | 2 | 0 | 26 | 0 |
| Plymouth Argyle | Total | | 38 | 0 | 3 | 0 | 41 | 0 |
| Hamilton Academical | 1915–16 | Scottish League Division One | 9 | 0 | — | | 9 | 0 |
| Hamilton Academical | 1916–17 | Scottish League Division One | 29 | 0 | — | | 29 | 0 |
| Hamilton Academical | 1917–18 | Scottish League Division One | 4 | 0 | — | | 4 | 0 |
| Hamilton Academical | Total | | 42 | 0 | — | | 42 | 0 |
| Ayr United | 1917–18 | Scottish League Division One | 3 | 0 | — | | 3 | 0 |
| Motherwell | 1918–19 | Scottish League Division One | 29 | 0 | — | | 29 | 0 |
| Clyde | 1918–19 | Scottish League Division One | 1 | 0 | — | | 1 | 0 |
| Plymouth Argyle | 1919–20 | Southern League First Division | 40 | 0 | 3 | 0 | 43 | 0 |
| Plymouth Argyle | 1920–21 | Third Division | 42 | 0 | 5 | 0 | 47 | 0 |
| Plymouth Argyle | 1921–22 | Third Division South | 36 | 0 | 2 | 0 | 38 | 0 |
| Plymouth Argyle | 1922–23 | Third Division South | 41 | 0 | 4 | 0 | 45 | 0 |
| Plymouth Argyle | 1923–24 | Third Division South | 42 | 0 | 1 | 0 | 43 | 0 |
| Plymouth Argyle | 1924–25 | Third Division South | 42 | 0 | 1 | 0 | 43 | 0 |
| Plymouth Argyle | 1925–26 | Third Division South | 42 | 0 | 1 | 0 | 43 | 0 |
| Plymouth Argyle | 1926–27 | Third Division South | 34 | 3 | 1 | 0 | 35 | 3 |
| Plymouth Argyle | 1927–28 | Third Division South | 12 | 1 | 0 | 0 | 12 | 1 |
| Plymouth Argyle | 1928–29 | Third Division South | 40 | 0 | 4 | 0 | 44 | 0 |
| Plymouth Argyle | 1929–30 | Third Division South | 30 | 1 | 4 | 0 | 34 | 1 |
| Plymouth Argyle | Total | | 439 | 5 | 28 | 0 | 467 | 5 |
| Career total | | | 514 | 5 | 28 | 0 | 542 | 5 |

== Honours ==
Plymouth Argyle

- Southern League First Division: 1912–13
- Football League Third Division South: 1929–30
